= UFC Freedom 250 =

2026 mixed martial arts event

- The poster for UFC Freedom 250
- Promotion: Ultimate Fighting Championship
- Date: June 14, 2026
- Venue: White House
- City: Washington, D.C., United States
- Attendance: Not announced (estimated 4,300)

Event chronology
UFC Fight Night: Muhammad vs. Bonfim	UFC Freedom 250	UFC Fight Night: Kape vs. Horiguchi

UFC Freedom 250 (also known as UFC White House and UFC at the White House) was a mixed martial arts event produced by the Ultimate Fighting Championship that took place on June 14, 2026, on the South Lawn of the White House in Washington, D.C., United States. The event's name is a reference to the 250th anniversary of the United States Declaration of Independence on the following July 4, 20 days later.

There was seating for roughly 4,300 people. No public seating was made available, with seats reserved for financial sponsors, political allies, and active-duty service members. The event marked the only UFC event to end with all fights ending by knockout, and also tied events UFC Fight Night: Rockhold vs. Bisping and UFC on ESPN: Santos vs. Hill for having all fights end by finish at a modern-era UFC event, which had 11 and 10 fights respectively.

The event was the most-watched exclusive live event on Paramount+ as of June 2026. It had 34 million viewers worldwide and was one of the most watched MMA events of all time. There was controversy surrounding the event's use of the White House to stage cage fighting, with most Americans disapproving of the idea according to a poll by Reuters/Ipsos.

== Background ==
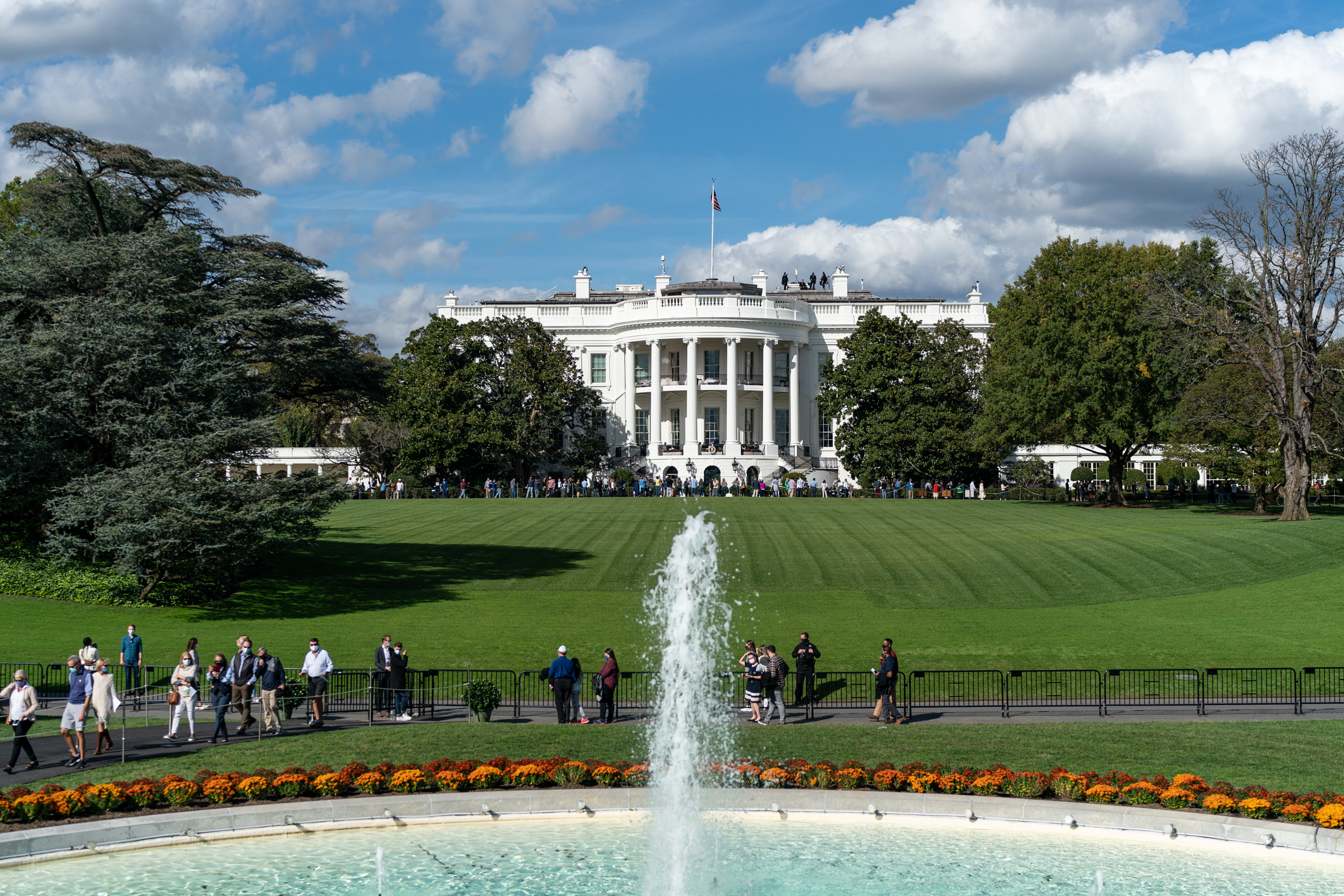
The South Lawn of the White House held the first professional sporting event staged at the presidential residence.

To commemorate the 250th anniversary of the United States, the UFC planned to hold a mixed martial arts event on the South Lawn of the White House in June 2026.

The event was first announced by President Donald Trump on July 3, 2025, during a rally at the Iowa State Fairgrounds. On August 29, 2025, UFC CEO Dana White confirmed that plans for the event had been finalized, stating: "We had the meeting at the White House ... The White House fight is on." The announcement followed Trump's remarks at the rally, where he referenced his long-standing friendship with White. Trump had frequently attended UFC events in recent years, including UFC 316 in New Jersey on June 7, 2025, where several fighters greeted him cageside.

While initial reports suggested a 4th of July date, the event was officially rescheduled for June due to logistical reasons. During a speech at Naval Station Norfolk on October 6, 2025, Trump announced that it would take place on June 14, 2026, coinciding with his 80th birthday and the Flag Day holiday. The rescheduled date drew criticism over its occurrence on Trump's birthday three weeks before July 4, with several news outlets describing it as celebrating Trump's birthday more than America's.

The event represented the UFC's third visit to Washington, D.C., and first since UFC on ESPN: Overeem vs. Rozenstruik in 2019. The weigh-ins took place at the Lincoln Memorial. The card aired on Paramount+. The event name, UFC Freedom 250, was announced during the UFC 326 broadcast on March 7, 2026.

== Logistics and planning ==
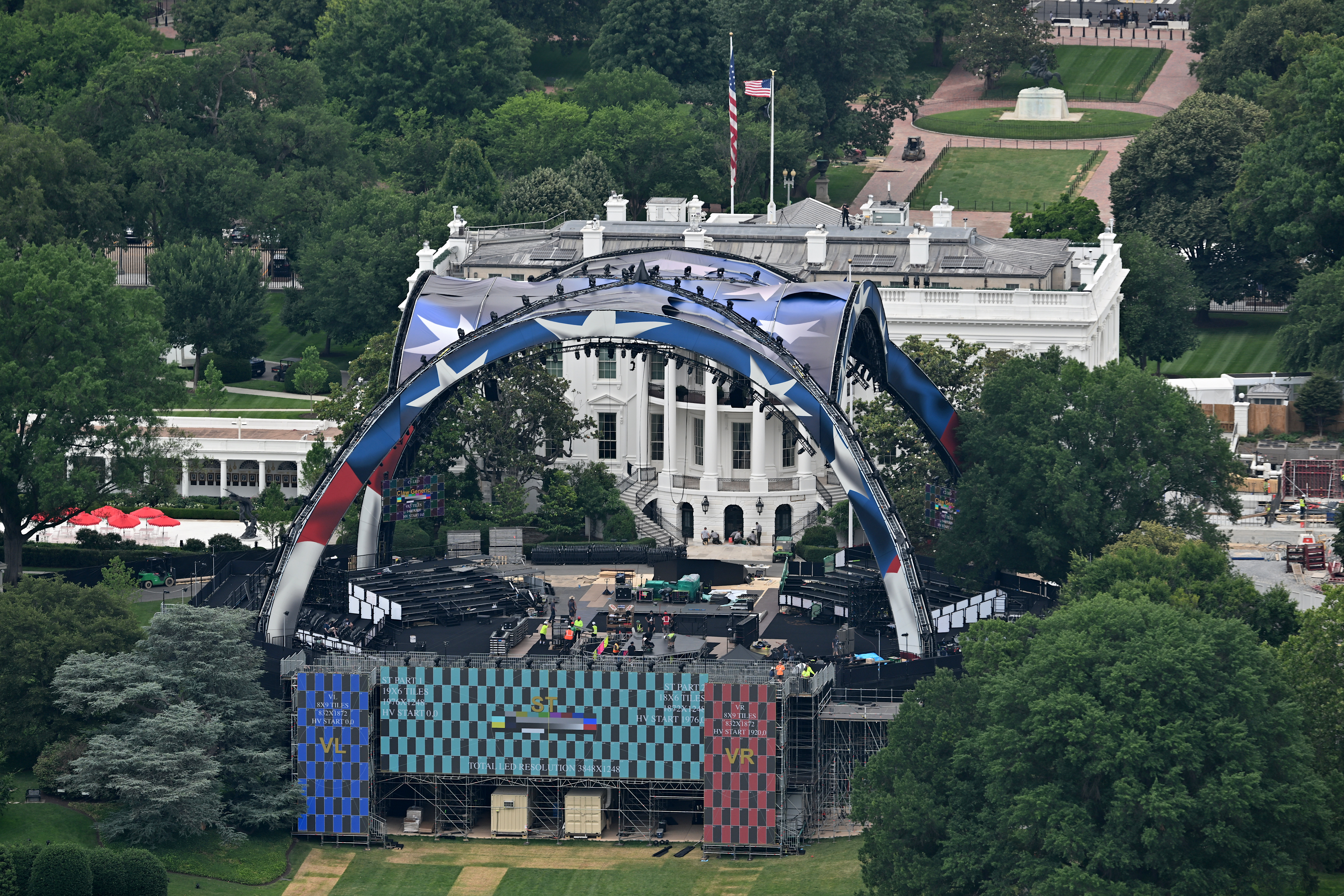
The event's venue under construction at the White House South Lawn

In a September 2025 interview, White said the seating capacity would be under 5,000 due to security concerns, a significant reduction from Trump's earlier estimate of 20,000 to 25,000 attendees. In a February 2026 interview, TKO Group Holdings CEO Ari Emanuel stated that there would be 3,000 to 4,000 people in attendance. White revealed in May that the capacity was expected to be 4,300. He also mentioned plans to install large screens at The Ellipse capable of hosting up to 85,000 spectators for a public viewing experience. White later announced that the 85,000 tickets for the viewing area would be available for free. The venue also held a fan fest the day before, headlined by the Zac Brown Band, and featured the ceremonial weigh-ins, meet and greets, on-stage entertainment, interactive experiences, and appearances from UFC athletes and other celebrities.

To prepare for the event, Stageco constructed a 92-foot tall arch called "the Claw" around an eight-sided fighting pit known as the "Octagon". Further reporting described the South Lawn audience as an invite-only crowd. Time reported that at least 1,200 of the approximately 4,300 seats would be allocated to active military members, while the remaining seats would be divided among the White House, TKO Group Holdings and the UFC. Tickets to the Ellipse events remained free but required registration, while South Lawn attendees were expected to present identification. In a separate interview with TMZ Sports, White said Trump had 1,000 tickets, White had 200, Emanuel had 200, and that the remaining seats would go to the military.

On May 29, The Washington Post reported that the Department of Defense had solicited military personnel to attend the event, with internal messages directing commands to identify junior enlisted personnel and junior officers. According to the report, personnel selected for tickets were required to pay their own travel costs, wear short-sleeve dress uniforms, and meet current waist-to-height ratio and physical fitness standards. One message reviewed by the newspaper also said tickets should be distributed to "genuine UFC fans" rather than high-ranking distinguished visitors.

Department of Homeland Security officials told TMZ that the event would feature Level 1 Special Event Assessment Rating (SEAR) security measures for the card happening on the South Lawn. The fan fest event, scheduled for June 13, would also feature SEAR 1 level security. Typically events that feature that level of security have multiple agencies monitoring and assistance could include explosive detection canine teams, cyber risk assessments, venue screening, field intelligence teams, air security and tactical operations support, including a no-drone zone, ground security as well as screening and surveillance along with security checkpoints.

During a fight week media day on June 10, UFC Chief Content Officer Craig Borsari spoke to reporters about possible issues with the weather and other logistical complications. Two obvious concerns raised by media, fighters, and fans alike were how the UFC planned to deal with the summer sun and heat, and the possibility of rain—or worse, a thunderstorm. He stated that "part of the reason why we picked an 8 p.m. start time was so that we could get some of the intense direct sunlight off of the canvas" and revealed they have a custom cover for the canvas, as well as a 100-foot (30 m) canopy or tarp “that also provides a lot of shade and reduces the heat quite a bit.” He also stated that light to moderate rain with no lightning will not stop the event and in the worst-case weather scenario, they have a contingency planning.

=== Budget and production ===
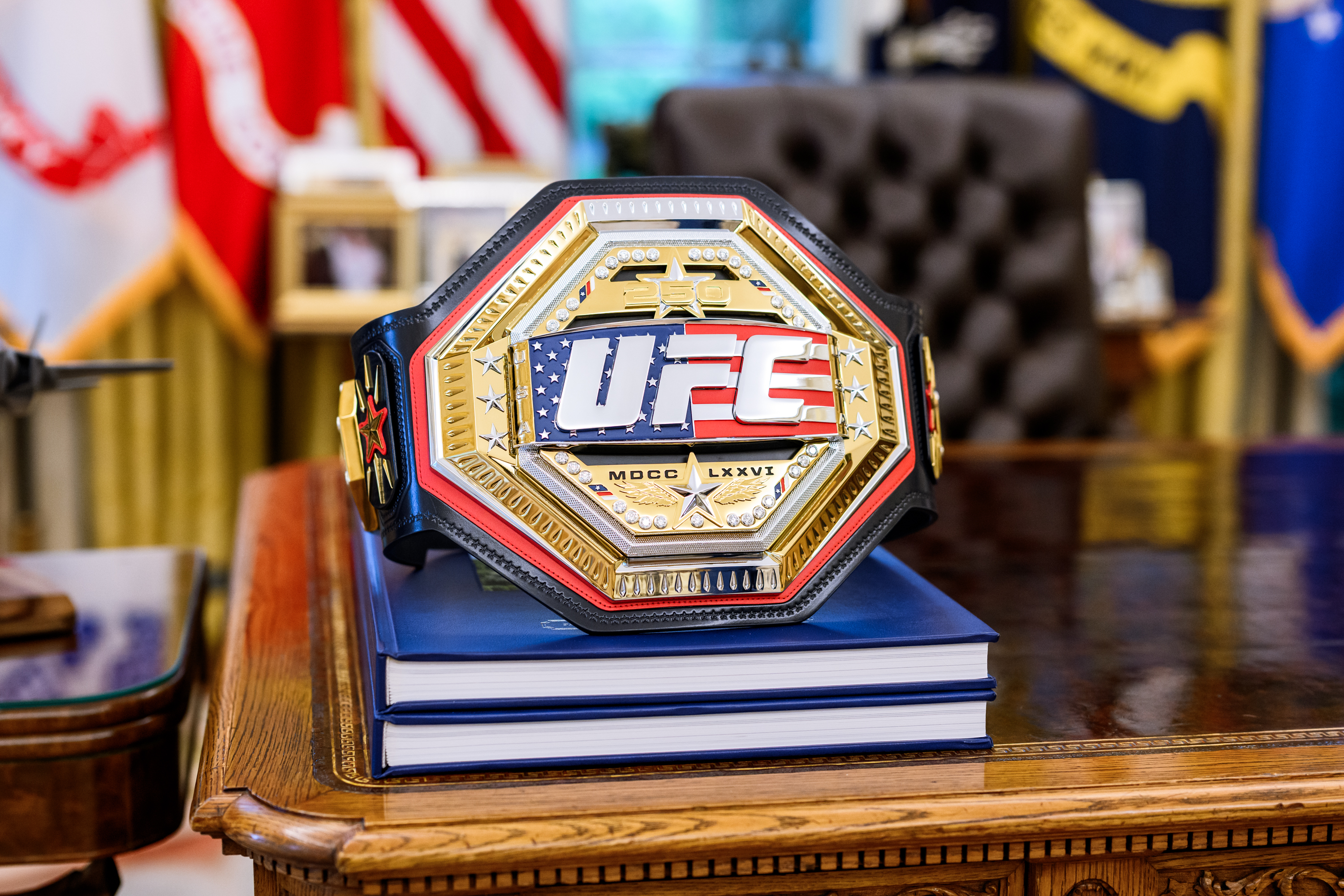
A custom belt designed exclusively for this event was revealed on May 6 and was awarded to both title fight winners.

The promotion is expected to cover the full cost of the event, including roughly $700,000 to restore the South Lawn after use, and no public tickets will be made available. In January 2026, it was reported that no taxpayer funding is being sought, and the overall expense of the event is projected to exceed the $21 million budget required to stage UFC 306's Sphere show in September 2024. In February 2026, it was estimated the cost rose to $60 million. TKO president Mark Shapiro stated that the event is not expected to turn a profit, with the goal being to recoup approximately half of the total cost through sponsors and new partnerships. In a June 2026 interview, White contended the cost would be worth it to propel MMA further into the mainstream, stating: "This is a huge brand play."

Although no public tickets were made available, combat sports journalist Ariel Helwani reported in May 2026 that the UFC had circulated a "partner investment" deck offering special access at a reported $1.5 million price point. The reported package included access to a partner welcome reception, reserved press-conference seating, ceremonial weigh-ins, the Zac Brown Band concert, floor seats for UFC 329, and WWE event integration and ring signage. BBC Sport reported that UFC sources confirmed the existence of special-guest packages but did not confirm the price. NBC News also reported that sponsorship packages including ringside seats had been selling for $1 million or more, while the tickets themselves were free.

=== Regulation ===
Marc Ratner, the UFC Vice President of Regulatory Affairs, revealed that because the White House grounds are federal property, the District of Columbia Combat Sports Commission would not regulate the event. The UFC was then expected to self‑regulate, as the District of Columbia Department of Parks and Recreation is responsible for oversight of such events within the district.

On March 16, the District of Columbia Combat Sports Commission announced that outcomes of the fights in this event could not be recognized on the athletes’ official records as the promotion was not going to pay a $100 permit to hold the event. In turn, the UFC announced that the Association of Boxing Commissions (ABC), which oversees boxing and MMA in the U.S., will be on hand to "serve as an independent third party to advise on the regulatory operations" of the event. "As the event is being held on federal property, there is no requirement for the UFC to select a state athletic commission to oversee the event," ABC president Timothy Shipman said in a release. "The UFC expresses its commitment to ensuring that this event is among the most thoroughly regulated in the history of the sport and has requested that the ABC serve as an independent third party to assist in assembling the most qualified group of judges, referees and inspectors in the world."

=== Fight card planning ===
==== Scheduled fights ====
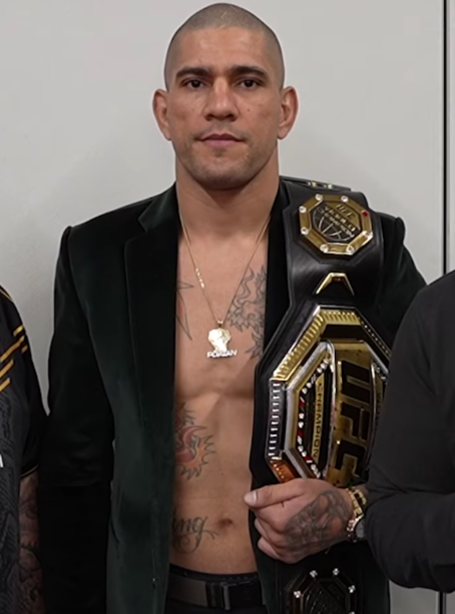
If victorious, Alex Pereira would have been the first fighter to win a UFC title in three different divisions.

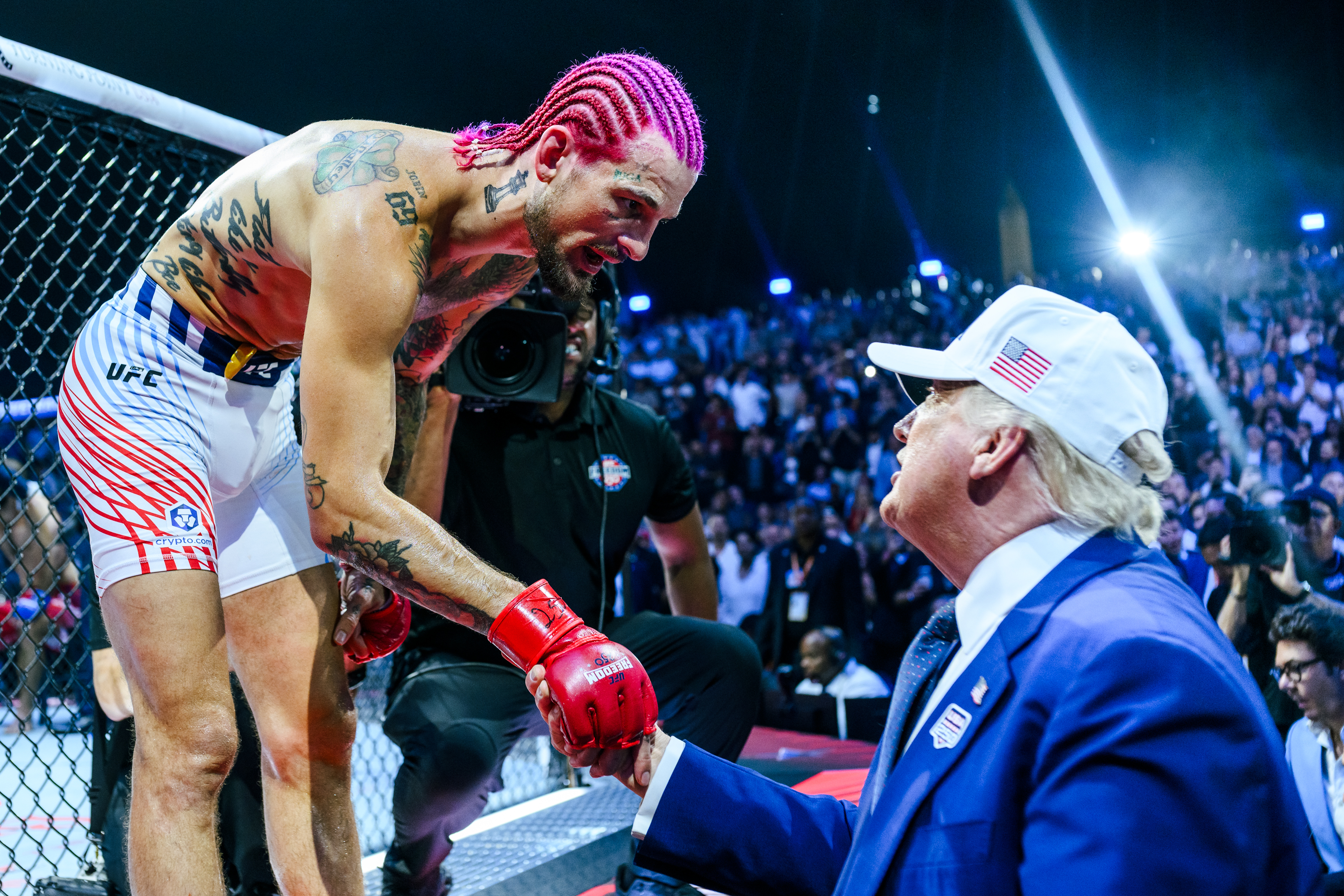
Sean O'Malley shakes Trump's hand

In a February 2026 interview, Ari Emanuel said the event would feature six or seven fights and be simulcast on CBS and Paramount+. Dana White stated on June 9 that the event would not be televised on CBS and the full broadcast would be on Paramount+. The original six-fight card for the event was first announced during the UFC 326 broadcast on March 7, 2026.

A UFC Lightweight Championship title unification bout between current champion and former UFC Featherweight Champion Ilia Topuria and current two-time interim champion (also a former WSOF Lightweight Champion) Justin Gaethje headlined the event. Arman Tsarukyan was originally expected to serve as backup and potential replacement for this fight. However, he opted against weighing in and Diego Lopes, who was scheduled to fight earlier in the event at featherweight (see below), also weighed in as the new potential replacement.

An interim UFC Heavyweight Championship bout between former two-time UFC Light Heavyweight Champion Alex Pereira (who also previously held the UFC Middleweight Championship and the Glory Middleweight and Light Heavyweight Championship titles in kickboxing) and former interim Heavyweight champion Ciryl Gane served as the co-main event. Pereira vacated his title in April in order to move up and challenge for the interim heavyweight title. Current champion Tom Aspinall was unable to compete following an eye injury suffered during his title defense against Gane in October 2025 at UFC 321.

The following fights completed the fight card:

- A bantamweight bout between former UFC Bantamweight Champion Sean O'Malley and Aiemann Zahabi, who entered the bout on a seven‑UFC-fight winning streak.
- A lightweight bout featuring Maurício Ruffy and former three-time Bellator Lightweight World Champion (also former UFC lightweight title challenger) Michael Chandler.
- A middleweight bout between three-time NCAA Division I National Wrestling Champion Bo Nickal and Kyle Daukaus, who entered the bout on a six‑fight win streak.
- A featherweight bout between former featherweight title challenger Diego Lopes and Steve Garcia, who had won his past seven UFC fights.
- A heavyweight bout between former heavyweight title challenger Derrick Lewis and undefeated 9–0 Josh Hokit. The pairing was the latest addition to the card, which was added right after Hokit's win at UFC 327 on April 11 on a direct request by Trump to see Lewis at the event.

==== Contract discussions and fighter availability ====
Dana White stated during the post-fight press conference for UFC 326 in March 2026 that, although there had been discussions between the promotion and Jon Jones, a former two-time UFC Light Heavyweight and one-time Heavyweight Champion, he was never considered as a potential headliner for the event. Days later, Jones disputed White's comments, stating that he had been in negotiations with the UFC in the days leading up to the announcement. He also publicly requested his release from the promotion.

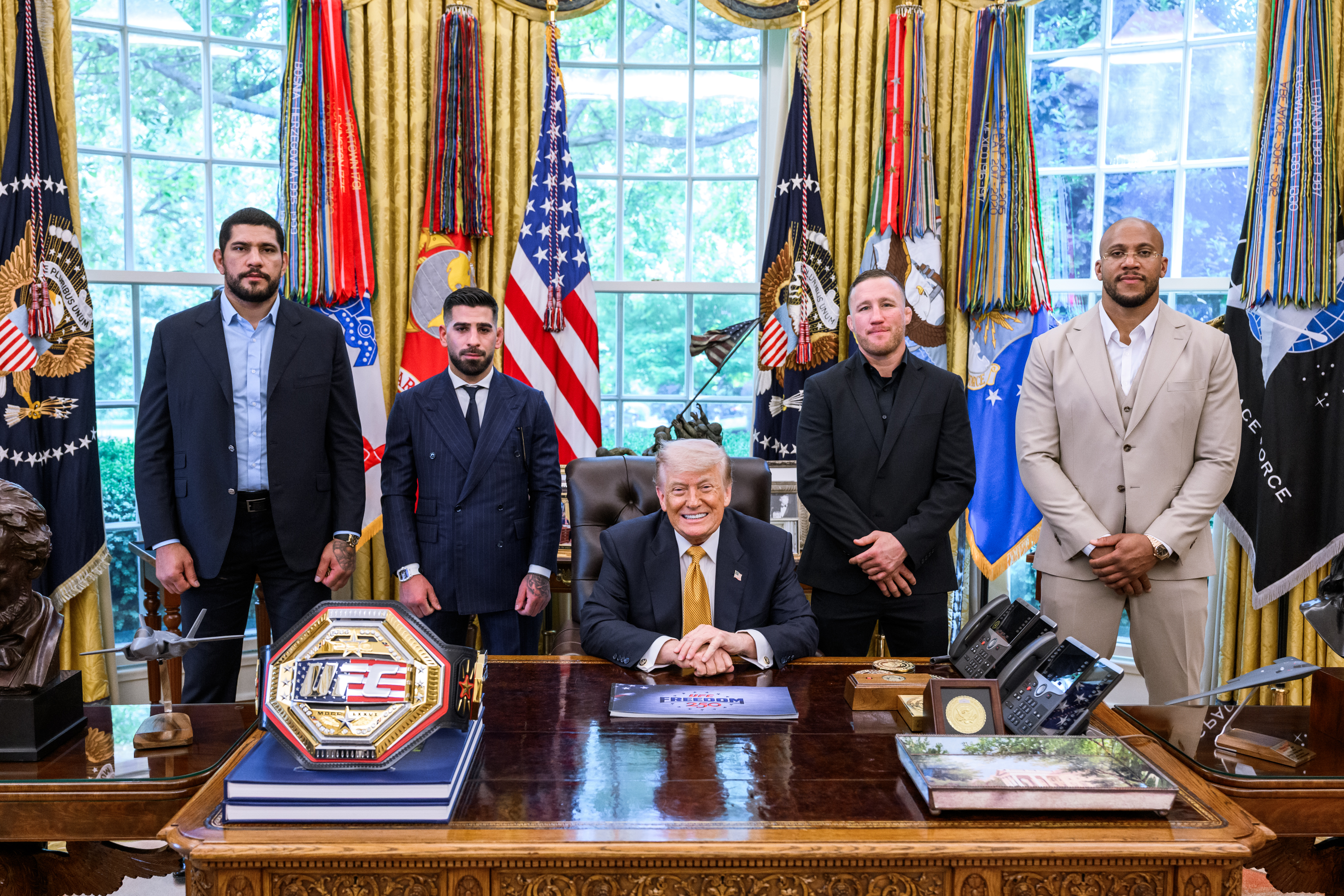
President Donald Trump (center) with the four fighters involved in the headliners; from left to right: Alex Pereira, Ilia Topuria, Justin Gaethje and Ciryl Gane

Ariel Helwani also reported that Jones was in negotiations to compete on the card, contradicting White's claim that Jones had not been considered, but that the sides did not agree on compensation. He further stated that Conor McGregor was not in serious talks to appear at the event and was instead expected to return during International Fight Week in July.

In a June 2026 interview, White stated that had current heavyweight champion Aspinall not been injured, he would have been defending his title against Pereira.

Separately, Topuria and his manager stated that he had been offered current UFC Welterweight Champion (also former lightweight champion) Islam Makhachev as a potential opponent before the bout with Gaethje was finalized. According to Topuria, he selected Makhachev as his preferred opponent and expressed interest in moving up to challenge for the welterweight title in an attempt to become the first three-division champion in UFC history, but Makhachev informed UFC officials that an injury prevented him from competing. In contrast to Topuria's claim that the bout fell through due to an injury on Makhachev's side, Makhachev stated that the negotiations broke down because Topuria and his team declined the UFC's offer after requesting $20 million. According to Makhachev, that demand ultimately prevented the fight from being finalized.

According to Helwani, the UFC's original planning for the event included a potential UFC Women's Bantamweight Championship bout between reigning champion Kayla Harrison, who is a 2012 and 2016 Olympic gold medalist in judo and a two-time PFL women's lightweight tournament champion, and former two-time champion Amanda Nunes, who also held the UFC Women's Featherweight Championship. However, Harrison was not ready to compete. He also reported that Pereira vs. Gane had initially been planned as the main event before the promotion asked Topuria whether he preferred to face Makhachev at welterweight or Gaethje at lightweight. Topuria reportedly chose Makhachev, but the bout was not made after Makhachev was unavailable due to a hand injury, leading to Gaethje receiving the title fight.

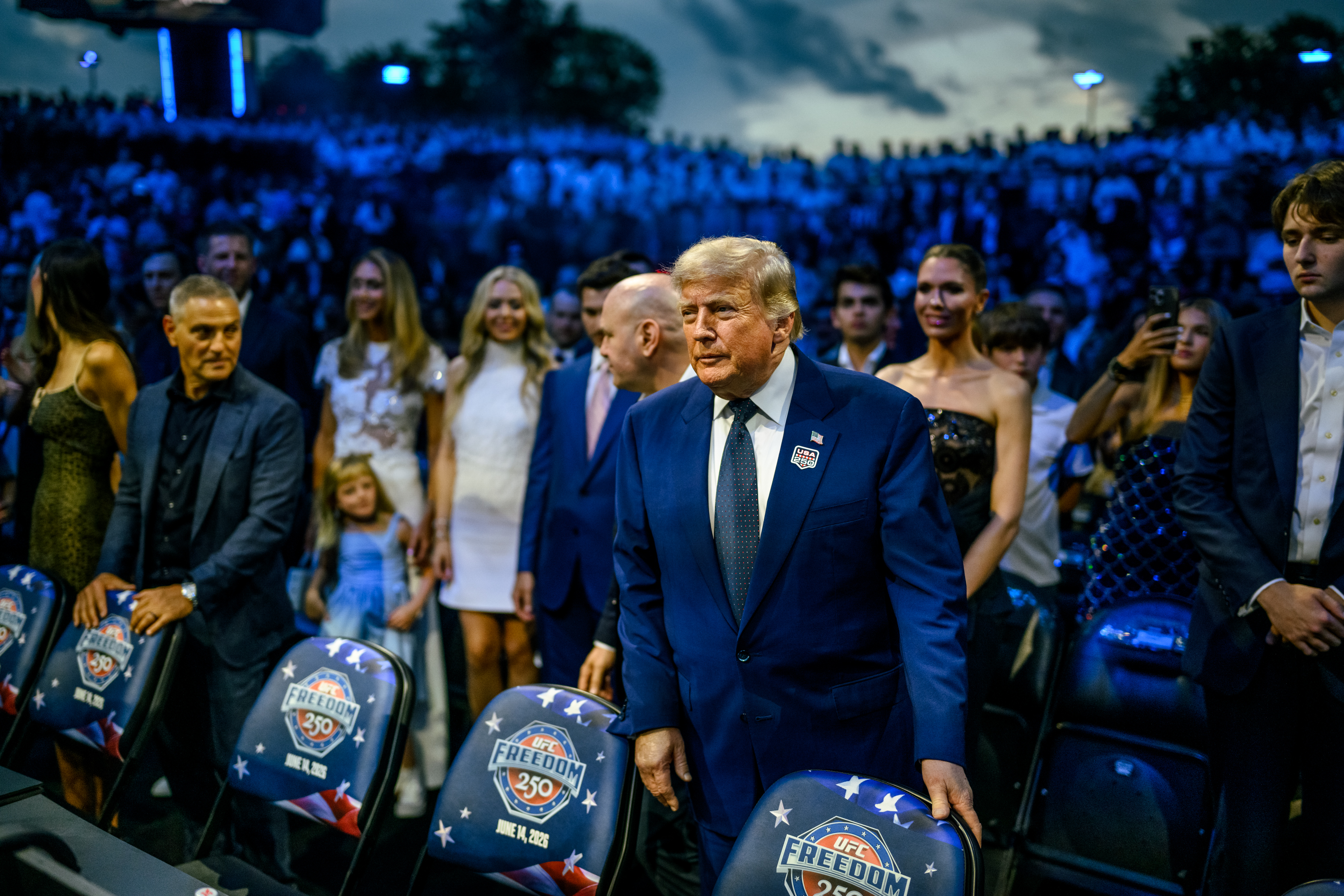
President Trump arriving at the event as family members look on

=== Entertainment ===
Country singer Zac Brown performed the U.S. national anthem at the event. This marked the first time since UFC 33 in September 2001 that the promotion planned for the national anthem to be performed during a fight card. The fighters entered the Octagon from various locations inside the White House, including the Oval Office for both headliners, with their walkout music performed live by the United States Marine Band.

Unlike typical UFC events that show previews for upcoming fights and promotional videos between fights, this event played vignettes celebrating the 250th anniversary of the United States, much like the UFC 306 event that took place inside Sphere in Las Vegas.

== Legal challenges ==
On June 6, 2026, an emergency lawsuit was filed by the Public Integrity Project, an anti-corruption watchdog group, on behalf of two plaintiffs, which aimed to block the event from occurring, describing it as a "deeply corrupt ... private, for-profit sports event". The lawsuit challenged the transformation of the White House grounds without congressional approval and the financial benefits of the event for the UFC, Dana White, Donald Trump, and their allies. A Trump administration official responded to the suit, calling it "obstructionist" and stating that the fight card was no different than other events hosted at the White House. The lawsuit also highlighted that Trump purchased between $15,001 and $50,000 worth of stock in TKO Group Holdings, the UFC's parent company, in March 2026. A Citizens for Responsibility and Ethics in Washington spokesperson called it "one of the worst conflicts of interest you could imagine". White later said that they were already expecting a lawsuit, but they "thought it would be sooner". On June 10, attorneys representing the National Park Service and U.S. Department of the Interior filed a memorandum in opposition to the plaintiffs’ emergency application for a temporary restraining order. On June 12, Judge Amit Mehta of the U.S. District Court for the District of Columbia refused to issue a preliminary injunction, allowing the event to proceed as planned.

== Results ==
Fight card (Paramount+)
Weight class				Method	Round	Time	Notes
Lightweight	Justin Gaethje (ic)	def.	Ilia Topuria (c)	TKO (corner stoppage)	4	5:00	(Note: For the UFC Lightweight Championship.)
Heavyweight	Ciryl Gane	def.	Alex Pereira	TKO (punches)	2	1:27	(Note: For the interim UFC Heavyweight Championship.)
Bantamweight	Sean O'Malley	def.	Aiemann Zahabi	TKO (punches)	2	4:02
Heavyweight	Josh Hokit	def.	Derrick Lewis	TKO (punches)	2	4:09
Lightweight	Maurício Ruffy	def.	Michael Chandler	TKO (spinning wheel kick and punches)	1	4:29
Middleweight	Bo Nickal	def.	Kyle Daukaus	TKO (punches and elbows)	1	4:34
Featherweight	Diego Lopes	def.	Steve Garcia	KO (punches)	2	2:42

== Bonus awards ==
In April 2026, the UFC announced that Crypto.com would fund a US$1 million cryptocurrency bonus for the event, intended to reward the top performances on the card. The special $1 million cryptocurrency prize pool created for the event was split evenly between Justin Gaethje and Ilia Topuria.

On June 12, 2026, Dana White announced that the fight night awards for this event would receive a major increase as World Liberty Financial (a venture of the Trump family and the family of Steve Witkoff, Trump’s friend and special envoy to the Middle East) joined as a new sponsor and added $250,000 to the bonus pool. In addition to the standard UFC amounts, "Performance of the Night" recipients earned $100,000 from the UFC, $125,000 in USD1 sponsored by World Liberty Financial, and $200,000 in CRO sponsored by Crypto.com, for a total of $425,000 each. "Fight of the Night" winners received $100,000 from the UFC along with $300,000 in CRO from Crypto.com, totaling $400,000 per athlete. The additional $25,000 UFC finish bonuses for knockouts or submissions not selected among the main post‑fight awards also remained in effect.

- Fight of the Night: Justin Gaethje vs. Ilia Topuria
- Performance of the Night: Justin Gaethje and Ciryl Gane

== Aftermath ==
This event marked the only UFC event to end with all fights ending by knockout. It also tied events UFC Fight Night: Rockhold vs. Bisping and UFC on ESPN: Santos vs. Hill for having all fights end by finish at a modern-era UFC event, which had 11 and 10 fights respectively.

In a post-fight interview with Joe Rogan, fighter Josh Hokit repeated previously stated false claims that former First Lady Michelle Obama is actually a man. His comments drew outrage throughout social media. Dana White told Time he is "completely against saying nasty and false things about people's families." However, no sanction was announced.

=== Attempted terrorist attack ===
After the event, the FBI claimed they disrupted an attempted terrorist attack targeting attendees of the event. According to investigators, the plan involved using explosive-laden drones to strike buildings near the event, triggering an evacuation. Attendees would then be directed toward an area where snipers were positioned, followed by a planned attack on the White House gates. The FBI reportedly discovered the threat on June 10, with suspects allegedly conducting final preparations in Fredericksburg, Virginia. Numerous suspects were later taken into custody.

On July 9, 2026, the U.S. Department of Justice announced that a federal grand jury has indicted eight men over an alleged plot to attack the event.

== Reception ==
The New York Times described it as a "mass-media spectacle unlike any in the history of the presidency", highlighting its use of the White House for "violent cage fighting" and eruptions of "casual cruelty" as "astonishing". The Associated Press described the event as "bread and circuses" and interviewed historians who compared it to gladiatorial games held in Imperial Rome. Conversely, Michael Caputo praised the event in The American Conservative, dismissing critics as elitist "snobs". Polling conducted by Reuters and Ipsos found that only 16% of Americans found the event appropriate to hold on the White House lawn, with only a third of Republicans approving of the plan.

=== Viewership ===
According to Dana White, the card brought in high numbers of viewers with reportedly 200,000 fans attending the two-day event on the Ellipse, and that viewership numbers on Paramount+ were "monstrous". It was broadcast exclusively on Paramount+ in the U.S. and Latin America, with a reported average of 8.2 million viewers and at least 17 million unique viewers making it the most-watched exclusive live event on Paramount+ to-date.

The UFC stated that updated international metrics increased total viewership for the event to an estimated 34 million, setting the domestic record for the most‑watched event in the promotion's history.

== See also ==
- 2026 in UFC
- List of current UFC fighters
- List of UFC events
