= Tom Duquesnoy =

French mixed martial artist (born 1993)

- Born: June 21, 1993 (age 33); Lens, France
- Other names: Fire Kid
- Nationality: French
- Height: 5 ft 7 in (1.70 m)
- Weight: 135 lb (61 kg; 9 st 9 lb)
- Division: Bantamweight (2016–2019); Featherweight (2012–2015)
- Fighting out of: Paris, France
- Team: Jackson Wink MMA
- Trainer: Greg Jackson
- Years active: 2012–2019

Mixed martial arts record
- Total: 19
- Wins: 16
- By knockout: 8
- By submission: 4
- By decision: 4
- Losses: 2
- By submission: 1
- By decision: 1
- No contests: 1

Other information
- Mixed martial arts record from Sherdog

Tom Phillipe Duquesnoy (born June 21, 1993, in Lens, Pas-de-Calais, France) is a retired French mixed martial artist. He is the former undisputed BAMMA Featherweight Champion and undisputed BAMMA Bantamweight Champion, and fought in the bantamweight division of the Ultimate Fighting Championship (UFC).

He is known for his quick striking and dynamic style. In 2015, Duquesnoy was named the #1 featherweight prospect in the world and "one of the very best talents in all of MMA", and was ranked the #1 prospect worldwide in all of MMA for both 2016 and 2017.

== Early martial arts career ==
Tom Duquesnoy was born in Lens, France, and grew up there until he moved to Paris when he was 18. His grandparents had moved to Lens from Poland after World War II, hoping to find work in the city's coal mines. After the mines closed in the 1960s, the residents moved on to other pursuits. Duquesnoy's father encouraged him to learn martial arts to protect himself, and he began training in sambo at the age of 12. He eventually became interested in other forms of martial arts, including boxing, wrestling, and muay Thai. When he turned 18, his father offered to pay for a year of living and training in Paris, on the condition that Duquesnoy could prove he could make a career from fighting. Duquesnoy went on to have a successful amateur career, with a record of 7–1, and made his professional debut in February 2012. Despite suffering his only loss in February 2013, Duquesnoy has continued to fight and win in various combat sports.

== Mixed martial arts career ==
=== Early career ===
After moving to Paris, Duquesnoy fought as an amateur and compiled a 7–1 record before turning professional in February 2012.

Duquesnoy made his professional MMA debut in February 2012. Over the next five years he fought at various events across Europe and amassed a record of 14 wins, one loss and one No Contest.

=== Ultimate Fighting Championship ===
Duquesnoy made his promotional debut against Patrick Williams on April 16, 2017, at UFC on Fox 24. After nearly finishing Williams at the end of the first round, he won the fight via TKO in the opening minute of the second round.

Duquesnoy faced Cody Stamann on October 7, 2017, at UFC 216. He lost the fight by split decision.

Duquesnoy faced Terrion Ware on March 17, 2018, at UFC Fight Night 127. He won the fight by unanimous decision.

Duquesnoy was scheduled to face Nathaniel Wood on December 29, 2018, at UFC 232. However, Duquesnoy pulled out of the fight on November 12 citing a rib injury.

On May 12, 2019, Duquesnoy announced his retirement from professional MMA competition.

== Personal life ==
Duquesnoy's moniker "Fire Kid" was coined for his explosive energy and youthful appearance.

== Championships and accomplishments ==
=== Mixed martial arts ===
- BAMMA
  - BAMMA World Featherweight Championship (One time)
  - Three Successful Title Defences
  - BAMMA World Bantamweight Championship (One time)
  - One Successful Title Defence
- Killa-Cam Featherweight World Champion (One time)
- BB-Beatdown Featherweight GP Champion (One time)

== Mixed martial arts record ==
Professional record breakdown
19 matches	16 wins	2 losses
By knockout	8	0
By submission	4	1
By decision	4	1
No contests	1	

Res.	Record	Opponent	Method	Event	Date	Round	Time	Location	Notes
Win	16–2 (1)	Terrion Ware	Decision (unanimous)	UFC Fight Night: Werdum vs. Volkov	March 17, 2018	3	5:00	London, England	
Loss	15–2 (1)	Cody Stamann	Decision (split)	UFC 216	October 7, 2017	3	5:00	Las Vegas, Nevada, United States	
Win	15–1 (1)	Patrick Williams	TKO (elbow and punch)	UFC on Fox: Johnson vs. Reis	April 15, 2017	2	0:28	Kansas City, Missouri, United States	
Win	14–1 (1)	Alan Philpott	Submission (rear-naked choke)	BAMMA 27	December 16, 2016	2	3:35	Dublin, Ireland	Defended the BAMMA World Bantamweight Championship.
Win	13–1 (1)	Shay Walsh	KO (elbow)	BAMMA 25	May 14, 2016	1	1:15	Birmingham, England	Won the BAMMA World Bantamweight Championship.
Win	12–1 (1)	Damien Rooney	KO (punch)	BAMMA 24	February 27, 2016	1	1:22	Dublin, Ireland	Bantamweight debut. BAMMA World Bantamweight title eliminator.
Win	11–1 (1)	Brendan Loughnane	Decision (split)	BAMMA 22	September 19, 2015	3	5:00	Dublin, Ireland	Defended the BAMMA World Featherweight Championship.
Win	10–1 (1)	Krzysztof Klaczek	TKO (body kick and punches)	BAMMA 18	February 21, 2015	3	1:37	Wolverhampton, England	Defended the BAMMA World Featherweight Championship.
NC	9–1 (1)	Ashleigh Grimshaw	NC (accidental groin kick)	BAMMA 16	September 13, 2014	1	0:11	Manchester, England	Retained the BAMMA World Featherweight Championship.
Win	9–1	Teddy Violet	Submission (triangle choke)	BAMMA 15	April 5, 2014	2	1:29	London, England	Won the vacant BAMMA World Featherweight Championship.
Win	8–1	James Saville	TKO (punches and elbows)	BAMMA 14	December 14, 2013	2	4:04	Birmingham, England	
Win	7–1	Scott Hunt	TKO (punches)	Killacam Promotions 6: Mercenaries	August 25, 2013	1	0:34	Margate, England	Won the Killacam Promotions Featherweight World Championship.
Win	6–1	Azdren Thaqi	Submission (guillotine choke)	Belgium Beatdown 4	April 13, 2013	2	0:19	Brussels, Belgium	Won the Belgium Beatdown 4 Man Featherweight Grand Prix.
Win	5–1	Evgeniy Odnorog	Decision (unanimous)	Belgium Beatdown 4	April 13, 2013	3	5:00	Brussels, Belgium	Belgium Beatdown 4 Man Featherweight Grand Prix Semifinal.
Loss	4–1	Makwan Amirkhani	Technical Submission (D'Arce choke)	Cage 21: Turku 2	February 2, 2013	1	2:30	Turku, Finland	
Win	4–0	Andrew Elliott	Submission (guillotine choke)	Killacam Promotions 5: Apocalypse	December 8, 2012	1	0:35	Margate, England	
Win	3–0	Mickael Ignaczak	TKO (punches)	Hard Fighting Championship 5	June 23, 2012	2	2:00	Bruchsal, Germany	
Win	2–0	Manuel Collet	Decision (unanimous)	Shooto Belgium: International MMA Open	May 6, 2012	2	5:00	Charleroi, Belgium	
Win	1–0	Aboubacar Askabov	TKO (punches)	HFC: Contender	February 11, 2012	1	4:15	Bruchsal, Germany	

== See also ==
- List of current UFC fighters
- List of male mixed martial artists
