= Merab Dvalishvili =

Georgian-American mixed martial artist (born 1991)

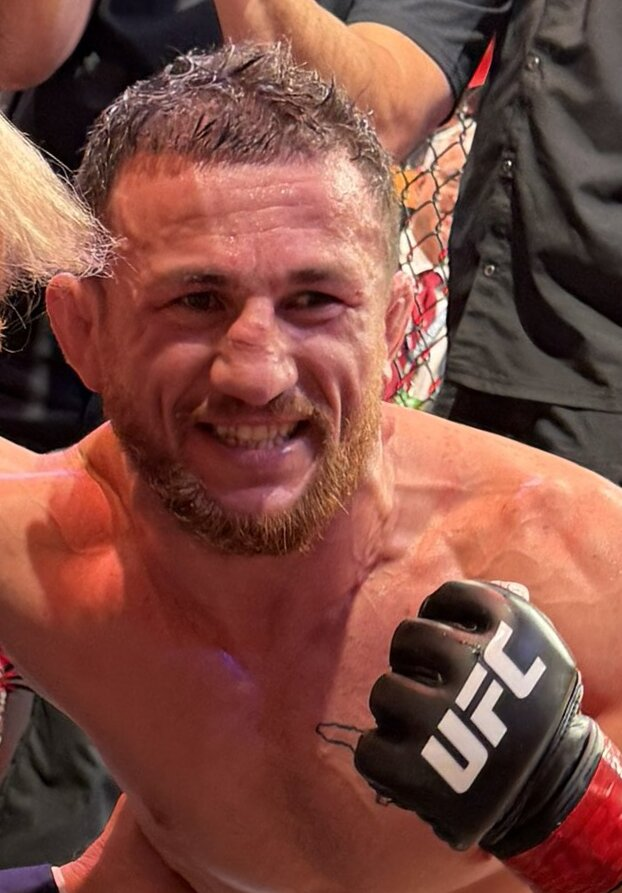
- Dvalishvili in 2025
- Born: January 10, 1991 (age 35); Vani, Imereti, Georgian SSR, Soviet Union
- Native name: მერაბ დვალიშვილი
- Other names: The Machine
- Citizenship: Georgia; United States (since 2024)
- Height: 5 ft 5 in (1.65 m)
- Weight: 135 lb (61 kg; 9 st 9 lb)
- Division: Bantamweight (2014–present); Featherweight (2016)
- Reach: 68 in (173 cm)
- Style: Combat sambo
- Fighting out of: Las Vegas, Nevada, U.S.
- Team: Serra-Longo Fight Team (2013–present)
- Trainer: Ray Longo and Matt Serra
- Rank: Black belt in Judo; Purple belt in Brazilian Jiu-Jitsu under Matt Serra
- Years active: 2014–present

Mixed martial arts record
- Total: 27
- Wins: 21
- By knockout: 3
- By submission: 2
- By decision: 16
- Losses: 6
- By submission: 1
- By decision: 5

Other information
- Website: officialmerabdvalishvili.com
- Mixed martial arts record from Sherdog
Medal record
Representing Georgia
Men’s combat sambo
World Championships
| Silver medal – second place | 2019 Cheongju | 68 kg |
US Open Sambo Championships
| Gold medal – first place | 2024 Denton | 64 kg |

Freestyle wrestling record
- Total: 3
- Wins: 2
- Losses: 1

YouTube information
- Channel: Merab "The Machine" Dvalishvili
- Subscribers: 142 thousand
- Views: 18.3 million
- Last updated: January 16, 2026

Merab Dvalishvili (Georgian: მერაბ დვალიშვილი [ˈmerab ˈdʷaliʃʷili]; born January 10, 1991) is a Georgian and American professional mixed martial artist and sambo practitioner. He currently competes in the Bantamweight division of the Ultimate Fighting Championship (UFC), where he is the former UFC Bantamweight Champion. Dvalishvili is considered one of the greatest Bantamweights of all time. He is also the first Georgian-born champion in UFC history. As of May 12, 2026, he is #1 in the Meta UFC bantamweight rankings, and as of November 17, 2026, he is #10 in the UFC men's pound-for-pound rankings.

Dvalishvili's UFC career began with two losses against Frankie Saenz and Ricky Simón. After that, he had a 14-fight win streak—the fourth longest in UFC history—defeating former champions, including José Aldo, Petr Yan, Henry Cejudo and Sean O'Malley. His 124 successful takedowns are the most in UFC history; he is also second all-time in total strikes landed.

== Background ==
Dvalishvili was born in Vani, a small village in Soviet Georgia and grew up in an independent Georgia. He moved to Tbilisi, the capital, age nine. He started training at a young age, training in kartuli ch'idaoba (ქართული ჭიდაობა; traditional Georgian wrestling), khridoli (ხრიდოლი; traditional Georgian fighting), sambo, and judo for self-defense. He moved to the United States when he was 21 years old to become a professional MMA fighter. Once in America, he began to train under Ray Longo and Matt Serra.

== Mixed martial arts career ==
=== Early career ===
Dvalishvili started his MMA career in 2014. He fought under various promotions, namely CFFC losing his debut and the Ring of Combat before getting signed on Dana White Looking for a Fight after defending his ROC title, amassing a record of 7–2 before competing in the UFC.

On June 2, 2017, Dvalishvili's matchup against fellow prospect Raufeon Stots was showcased on an episode of 'Dana White: Lookin' for a Fight'. He won this contest via spinning backfist KO 15 seconds into the first round and was subsequently awarded a contract by UFC President Dana White.

=== Ultimate Fighting Championship ===
Dvalishvili made his UFC debut on December 9, 2017, against Frankie Saenz at UFC Fight Night: Swanson vs. Ortega. He lost the fight via split decision. 10 out of 13 media outlets scored the bout for Dvalishvili.

His next fight came on April 21, 2018, at UFC Fight Night: Barboza vs. Lee against Ricky Simón. He lost the fight via technical submission at the final bell. This fight earned him the Fight of the Night award. Dvalishvili's team appealed the result on the grounds that he was not unconscious at the end of the round, but the appeal was denied.

Dvalishvili faced Terrion Ware on September 15, 2018, at UFC Fight Night: Hunt vs. Oleinik. He won the fight via unanimous decision.

Dvalishvili faced Brad Katona on May 4, 2019, at UFC Fight Night: Iaquinta vs. Cowboy. He won the fight via unanimous decision.

Dvalishvili faced Casey Kenney on February 15, 2020, at UFC Fight Night 167. He won the fight by unanimous decision.

Dvalishvili was scheduled to face Ray Borg on June 13, 2020, at UFC on ESPN: Eye vs. Calvillo. However, on June 11, 2020, it was reported that Borg withdrew from the bout and he was replaced by promotional newcomer Gustavo Lopez in a catchweight bout of 140 pounds. Dvalishvili was victorious via unanimous decision.

Dvalishvili faced John Dodson on August 15, 2020, at UFC 252. He won the fight via unanimous decision.

Dvalishvili was expected to face Cody Stamann on December 5, 2020, at UFC on ESPN 19. However, on October 22, it was announced that Stamann pulled out due to undisclosed reasons, and he was replaced by Raoni Barcelos. However, Barcelos was removed from the contest due to a medical suspension related to his latest bout on November 7. The bout between Dvalishvili and Stamann was rescheduled for UFC Fight Night 184 on February 6, 2021. In turn, in mid-January, Dvalishvili was forced to pull out from the bout due to the struggle of the after-effects of a COVID-19 complication, and he was replaced by Andre Ewell. After a positive test for COVID-19, Ewell was pulled from the event and replaced by promotional newcomer Askar Askar, with the contest expected to take place at featherweight. On the day of the event, Askar was not medically cleared and the bout was canceled. The bout between Dvalishvili and Stamann was rescheduled again to May 1, 2021, at UFC on ESPN: Reyes vs. Procházka. Dvalishvili won the bout via unanimous decision.

Dvalishvili faced Marlon Moraes on September 25, 2021, at UFC 266. After being knocked down and nearly finished in the first round, Dvalishvili rallied and won the fight via TKO in round two. This win earned him the Performance of the Night award.

Dvalishvili faced former UFC Featherweight champion José Aldo on August 20, 2022, at UFC 278. He won the bout via unanimous decision.

Dvalishvili faced former UFC Bantamweight champion Petr Yan on March 11, 2023, at UFC Fight Night: Yan vs. Dvalishvili. He won the fight via unanimous decision. Dvalishvili broke the UFC record for most takedowns attempted in a single bout with 49 attempts.

Dvalishvili faced former UFC Flyweight and Bantamweight champion Henry Cejudo on February 17, 2024, at UFC 298. In a bout where five takedowns were landed, Dvalishvili won by unanimous decision.

==== UFC Bantamweight Championship ====
Dvalishvili faced Sean O'Malley for the UFC Bantamweight Championship on September 14, 2024, at UFC 306. He won the fight and the title by unanimous decision.

Dvalishvili made his first title defense against undefeated contender Umar Nurmagomedov on January 18, 2025, at UFC 311. He won the fight by unanimous decision. This fight earned him another Fight of the Night award. Dvalishvili broke the record for most takedowns landed in UFC history with 92.

Dvalishvili made his second title defense against former UFC Bantamweight champion Sean O'Malley in a rematch on June 7, 2025, at UFC 316. He won the fight via a north-south choke submission at the end of the third round. This fight earned him another Performance of the Night award.

Dvalishvili made his third title defense against former interim title challenger Cory Sandhagen on October 4, 2025, at UFC 320. He won the fight by unanimous decision.

For his fourth title defense, Dvalishvili rematched former champion Petr Yan at UFC 323 on December 6, 2025. With a win, Dvalishvili would become the first UFC champion in history to defend a title four times in the same calendar year. He lost the championship by unanimous decision. This fight earned him another Fight of the Night award.

Dvalishvili faced Yan in a trilogy bout for the championship on October 24, 2026 at UFC 333. He lost the fight by unanimous decision. This fight earned him a $100,000 Fight of the Night award.

== Fighting style ==
Dvalishvili is known for having exceptional cardiovascular fitness and muscular endurance. This enables him to compete at a high-pace and attempt a large amount of takedowns for the duration of a contest without major adverse effects to his speed, technique or overall demeanour. Dvalishvili holds the record for most total takedowns in UFC history, with 117 landed during his time in the promotion.

Dvalishvili often utilises attacks in the clinch, landing knees to the thighs of his opponents up against the cage wall or short punches in transitions. In the open space he will often threaten with spinning attacks, such as the spinning back-kick or backfist whilst also utilising the persistent threat of his takedowns to land punches on his opponent.

Starting with his fight against Henry Cejudo in 2024, Dvalishvili became known for showboating during fights; Some examples of this include talking to Mark Zuckerberg while grappling with Cejudo, kissing Sean O'Malley on the head near the end of a round, and taunting Umar Nurmagomedov after a successful takedown near the end of their fight.

== Personal life ==
Dvalishvili became a naturalized American citizen in March 2024. Prior to becoming a full-time fighter, he worked in construction.

Dvalishvili was awarded a prize of 1 million Georgian Lari by the country's government for winning the UFC bantamweight title, and he donated it to support grappling in the area.

Dvalishvili has a close friendship with fellow UFC fighter and Serra-Longo teammate, Aljamain Sterling.

== Professional grappling career ==
In 2019, Dvalishvili won a silver medal at the World Sambo Championships in South Korea, competing in the ‍–‍68 kg weight class. He lost in the finals to Russia's Stepan Kobenov.

Dvalishvili fought in the main event of Fury Pro Grappling 2 on October 29, 2021, and lost a unanimous decision to Kevin Dantzler.

Dvalishvili competed against Darren Branch in the main event of High Rollerz 23 on January 21, 2023. He won the match by submission, with a choke from Kesa-gatame.

In June 2024, Dvalishvili won a gold medal competing in the ‍–‍64 kg weight class at the U.S. National Combat Sambo Tournament in Denton, Texas.

== Freestyle wrestling career ==
Dvalishvili was scheduled to debut for Real American Freestyle at RAF 08 on April 18, 2026, headlining against Henry Cejudo. However, Cejudo pulled out due to injury and the match was postponed.

He defeated Frankie Edgar on the undercard of RAF 09 on May 30, 2026. This fight earned him a Performance of the Night award.

Dvalishvili headlined RAF Georgia against Henry Cejudo on July 11, 2026. He won the match by decision. This fight earned him a Match of the Night award.

Dvalishvili faced Cejudo in a rematch for the inaugural RAF Lightweight Crossover Championship on August 22, 2026 at RAF 12. He lost the match by pinfall in 36 seconds of the first round.

Dvalishvili faced Marlon Moraes on November 14, 2026 at RAF Abu Dhabi. Dvalishvili won the match by pinfall in 90 second of the first round.

== Championships and accomplishments ==
=== Mixed Martial Arts ===
- Ultimate Fighting Championship
  - UFC Bantamweight Championship (One time, former)
    - Three successful title defenses
      - Tied (Aljamain Sterling) for the most consecutive title defenses in UFC Bantamweight division history (3)
      - Tied (Dominick Cruz, Renan Barão, Aljamain Sterling & Petr Yan) for second most UFC Bantamweight title fight wins (4)
    - First Georgian-born champion in UFC history
    - Most takedowns landed in a UFC title fight (20) (vs. Cory Sandhagen)
  - Fight of the Night (Four times) vs. Ricky Simón, Umar Nurmagomedov and Petr Yan 2 & 3
  - Performance of the Night (Two times) vs. Marlon Moraes and Sean O'Malley 2
  - Most unanimous decision wins in UFC history (12)
    - Most unanimous decision wins in UFC Bantamweight division history (11)
    - Most decision wins in UFC Bantamweight division history (11)
    - Fifth highest decision-wins-per-win percentage in UFC history (12 decision wins / 14 wins: 85.7%)
  - Longest win streak in UFC Bantamweight division history (13)
    - Fourth longest win streak in UFC history (14)
  - Most takedowns landed in UFC history (124)
    - First and only fighter to have over 100 takedowns in UFC history
    - Most takedowns landed in UFC Bantamweight division history (111)
  - Most total strikes landed in UFC Bantamweight division history (2831)
    - Second most total strikes landed in UFC history (2941) (behind Max Holloway)
  - Second most significant strikes landed in UFC Bantamweight division history (1380) (behind Petr Yan)
  - Most control time in UFC Bantamweight division history (1:40:04)
  - Tied (T.J. Dillashaw & Marlon Vera) for second most wins in UFC Bantamweight division history (13)
  - Second most total fight time in UFC Bantamweight division history (5:09:07) (behind Marlon Vera)
  - Second most top position time in UFC Bantamweight division history (55:44)
  - Second longest average fight time in UFC Bantamweight division history (18:11)
  - Holds wins over four former UFC champions — José Aldo, Petr Yan, Henry Cejudo and Sean O'Malley x2
  - UFC Honors Awards
    - 2021: Fan's Choice Comeback of the Year Nominee vs. Marlon Moraes
    - 2025: President's Choice Fight of the Year Nominee vs. Umar Nurmagomedov & Fan's Choice Submission of the Year Nominee vs. Sean O'Malley 2
  - UFC.com Awards
    - 2024: Ranked #6 Fighter of the Year
    - 2025: Fighter of the Year, Submission of the Year vs. Sean O'Malley 2 & Half-Year Awards: Best Fighter of the 1HY & Best Submission of the 1HY vs. Sean O'Malley
- Ring of Combat
  - ROC Bantamweight Championship (one time)
    - One successful title defense
- World MMA Awards
  - July 1, 2024 – December 31, 2025 Fighter of the Year
- ESPY Awards
  - 2025 Best MMA Fighter ESPY Award
- ESPN
  - 2025 Men's Fighter of the Year
- MMA Junkie
  - 2025 Male Fighter of the Year
- The Wrightway Sports Network
  - 2025 Male Fighter of the Year
- MMA Fighting
  - 2024 First Team MMA All-Star
  - 2025 #4 Ranked Fighter of the Year
  - 2025 #5 Ranked Fight of the Year vs. Petr Yan 2 at UFC 323
  - 2025 First Team MMA All-Star
- MMA Mania
  - 2025 Fighter of the Year
  - 2025 #3 Ranked Fight of the Year vs. Umar Nurmagomedov at UFC 311
  - 2025 #3 Ranked Submission of the Year vs. Sean O'Malley
- LowKick MMA
  - 2025 Fighter of the Year
- Cageside Press
  - 2025 Male Fighter of the Year
- Fight Matrix
  - 2025 Male Fighter of the Year with Islam Makhachev
  - 2025 Most Noteworthy Match of the Year vs. Petr Yan 2 at UFC 323
- Uncrowned
  - 2025 #3 Ranked Male Fighter of the Year

=== Freestyle Wrestling ===
- Real American Freestyle
  - Match of the Night (One time) vs. Henry Cejudo 1
  - Performance of the Night (One time) vs. Frankie Edgar
- UFC History Bout Records
  - Most takedowns attempted (58) (vs. Petr Yan 3)
    - Second most takedowns attempted (49) (vs. Petr Yan 1)
    - Third most takedowns attempted (37) (vs. Cory Sandhagen)
  - Second most takedowns landed in a UFC bout (20) (vs. Cory Sandhagen)
  - Only UFC fighter to land 10 or more takedowns in five separate bouts
- UFC Bantamweight Bout Records
  - Most total body strikes landed (127) (vs. Brad Katona)
  - Most total leg strikes landed (95) (vs. Jose Aldo)
  - Third most total strikes landed (246) (vs. Marlon Moraes)
    - Fourth most total strikes landed (243) (vs. Cory Sandhagen)
  - Third most total strikes attempted (458) (vs. Marlon Moraes)
  - Second most total clinch strikes landed (108) (vs. Cory Sandhagen)
    - Fifth most total clinch strikes landed (92) (vs. José Aldo)
  - Second most total ground strikes landed (216) (vs. Marlon Moraes)
    - Third most total ground strikes landed (189) (vs. Terrion Ware)
    - Fourth most total ground strikes landed (174) (vs. Brad Katona)
  - Most takedowns landed (20) (vs. Cory Sandhagen)
    - Third most takedowns landed (12) (vs. Casey Kenney)
    - Tied for fourth most takedowns landed (11) (vs. Frankie Saenz and Petr Yan 1)
  - Sixth most significant ground strikes landed (57) (vs. Marlon Moraes)
  - Most takedowns attempted (58) (vs. Petr Yan 3)
    - Second most takedowns attempted (49) (vs. Petr Yan 1)
    - Third most takedowns attempted (37) (vs. Cory Sandhagen)
    - Fourth most takedowns attempted (30) (vs. Umar Nurmagomedov)
    - Fifth most takedowns attempted (29) (vs. Petr Yan 2)
    - Tied for sixth most takedowns attempted (24) (vs. Casey Kenney)

== Mixed martial arts record ==
Professional record breakdown
| 27 matches | 21 wins | 6 losses |
| By knockout | 3 | 0 |
| By submission | 2 | 1 |
| By decision | 16 | 5 |

| Res. | Record | Opponent | Method | Event | Date | Round | Time | Location | Notes |
|---|---|---|---|---|---|---|---|---|---|
| Loss | 21–6 | Petr Yan | Decision (unanimous) | UFC 333 | October 24, 2026 | 5 | 5:00 | Abu Dhabi, United Arab Emirates | For the UFC Bantamweight Championship. Fight of the Night. |
| Loss | 21–5 | Petr Yan | Decision (unanimous) | UFC 323 | December 6, 2025 | 5 | 5:00 | Las Vegas, Nevada, United States | Lost the UFC Bantamweight Championship. Fight of the Night. |
| Win | 21–4 | Cory Sandhagen | Decision (unanimous) | UFC 320 | October 4, 2025 | 5 | 5:00 | Las Vegas, Nevada, United States | Defended the UFC Bantamweight Championship. Tied the record for the most consecutive UFC Bantamweight title defenses (3). |
| Win | 20–4 | Sean O'Malley | Submission (north-south choke) | UFC 316 | June 7, 2025 | 3 | 4:42 | Newark, New Jersey, United States | Defended the UFC Bantamweight Championship. Performance of the Night. |
| Win | 19–4 | Umar Nurmagomedov | Decision (unanimous) | UFC 311 | January 18, 2025 | 5 | 5:00 | Inglewood, California, United States | Defended the UFC Bantamweight Championship. Fight of the Night. |
| Win | 18–4 | Sean O'Malley | Decision (unanimous) | UFC 306 | September 14, 2024 | 5 | 5:00 | Las Vegas, Nevada, United States | Won the UFC Bantamweight Championship. |
| Win | 17–4 | Henry Cejudo | Decision (unanimous) | UFC 298 | February 17, 2024 | 3 | 5:00 | Anaheim, California, United States | |
| Win | 16–4 | Petr Yan | Decision (unanimous) | UFC Fight Night: Yan vs. Dvalishvili | March 11, 2023 | 5 | 5:00 | Las Vegas, Nevada, United States | |
| Win | 15–4 | José Aldo | Decision (unanimous) | UFC 278 | August 20, 2022 | 3 | 5:00 | Salt Lake City, Utah, United States | |
| Win | 14–4 | Marlon Moraes | TKO (punches) | UFC 266 | September 25, 2021 | 2 | 4:25 | Las Vegas, Nevada, United States | Performance of the Night. |
| Win | 13–4 | Cody Stamann | Decision (unanimous) | UFC on ESPN: Reyes vs. Procházka | May 1, 2021 | 3 | 5:00 | Las Vegas, Nevada, United States | |
| Win | 12–4 | John Dodson | Decision (unanimous) | UFC 252 | August 15, 2020 | 3 | 5:00 | Las Vegas, Nevada, United States | |
| Win | 11–4 | Gustavo Lopez | Decision (unanimous) | UFC on ESPN: Eye vs. Calvillo | June 13, 2020 | 3 | 5:00 | Las Vegas, Nevada, United States | Catchweight (140 lb) bout. |
| Win | 10–4 | Casey Kenney | Decision (unanimous) | UFC Fight Night: Anderson vs. Błachowicz 2 | February 15, 2020 | 3 | 5:00 | Rio Rancho, New Mexico, United States | |
| Win | 9–4 | Brad Katona | Decision (unanimous) | UFC Fight Night: Iaquinta vs. Cowboy | May 4, 2019 | 3 | 5:00 | Ottawa, Ontario, Canada | |
| Win | 8–4 | Terrion Ware | Decision (unanimous) | UFC Fight Night: Hunt vs. Oleinik | September 15, 2018 | 3 | 5:00 | Moscow, Russia | |
| Loss | 7–4 | Ricky Simón | Technical Submission (guillotine choke) | UFC Fight Night: Barboza vs. Lee | April 21, 2018 | 3 | 5:00 | Atlantic City, New Jersey, United States | Fight of the Night. |
| Loss | 7–3 | Frankie Saenz | Decision (split) | UFC Fight Night: Swanson vs. Ortega | December 9, 2017 | 3 | 5:00 | Fresno, California, United States | |
| Win | 7–2 | Raufeon Stots | KO (spinning backfist) | Ring of Combat 59 | June 2, 2017 | 1 | 0:15 | Atlantic City, New Jersey, United States | Defended the ROC Bantamweight Championship. |
| Win | 6–2 | Sukhrob Aydarbekov | Submission (armbar) | Ring of Combat 58 | February 24, 2017 | 2 | 4:14 | Atlantic City, New Jersey, United States | Won the vacant ROC Bantamweight Championship. |
| Win | 5–2 | Tony Gravely | Decision (split) | Ring of Combat 57 | November 18, 2016 | 3 | 5:00 | Atlantic City, New Jersey, United States | |
| Win | 4–2 | Paul Grant | Decision (unanimous) | Ring of Combat 56 | September 23, 2016 | 3 | 4:00 | Atlantic City, New Jersey, United States | Return to Bantamweight. |
| Win | 3–2 | Matt Tullos | Decision (unanimous) | CES MMA 36 | June 10, 2016 | 3 | 5:00 | Lincoln, Rhode Island, United States | Featherweight debut. |
| Win | 2–2 | Geoffrey Then | Decision (unanimous) | CES MMA 34 | April 1, 2016 | 3 | 5:00 | Mashantucket, Connecticut, United States | |
| Loss | 1–2 | Ricky Bandejas | Decision (unanimous) | Cage Fury FC 43 | November 1, 2014 | 3 | 5:00 | Atlantic City, New Jersey, United States | |
| Win | 1–1 | Dennis Dombrow | TKO (punches) | Ring of Combat 49 | September 19, 2014 | 3 | 0:50 | Atlantic City, New Jersey, United States | |
| Loss | 0–1 | Darren Mima | Decision (majority) | Ring of Combat 47 | January 24, 2014 | 3 | 4:00 | Atlantic City, New Jersey, United States | Bantamweight debut. |

== Freestyle wrestling record ==
Freestyle matches
| Res. | Record | Opponent | Score | Date | Event | Location |
|---|---|---|---|---|---|---|
| Win | 3–1 | (Brazil) Marlon Moraes | Fall | November 14, 2026 | RAF Abu Dhabi: Chimaev vs. Weidman | Abu Dhabi, United Arab Emirates |
| Loss | 2–1 | (United States) Henry Cejudo | Fall | August 22, 2026 | RAF 12: Dvalishvili vs. Cejudo 2 | (United States) Cleveland, Ohio |
| Win | 2–0 | (United States) Henry Cejudo | 11–8 | July 11, 2026 | RAF Georgia: Dvalishvili vs. Cejudo | (Georgia (country)) Tbilisi, Georgia |
| Win | 1–0 | (United States) Frankie Edgar | TF 12–1 | May 30, 2026 | RAF 09: Steveson vs. Romanov | (United States) Arlington, Texas |

== Pay-per-view bouts ==
| No | Event | Fight | Date | Venue | City | PPV buys |
|---|---|---|---|---|---|---|
| 1. | UFC 306 | O'Malley vs. Dvalishvili | September 14, 2024 | Sphere | Las Vegas, Nevada, United States | Not Disclosed |
| 2. | UFC 316 | Dvalishvili vs. O'Malley 2 | June 7, 2025 | Prudential Center | Newark, New Jersey, United States | Not Disclosed |
| 3. | UFC 323 | Dvalishvili vs. Yan 2 | December 6, 2025 | T-Mobile Arena | Las Vegas, Nevada, United States | Not Disclosed |

== See also ==
- List of current UFC fighters
- List of male mixed martial artists

Achievements
| Preceded by Sean O'Malley | 11th UFC Bantamweight Champion; September 14, 2024 – December 6, 2025 | Succeeded by Petr Yan |
Awards
| Preceded by Alex Pereira | World MMA Fighter of the Year; July 1, 2024 – December 31, 2025 | Incumbent |
| Preceded by Sean O'Malley | Best MMA Fighter ESPY Award; 2025 | Incumbent |
UFC records
| Preceded by Georges St-Pierre | Most takedowns landed January 18, 2025 – present 119 | Incumbent |
