= Sean O'Malley (fighter) =

American mixed martial artist (born 1994)

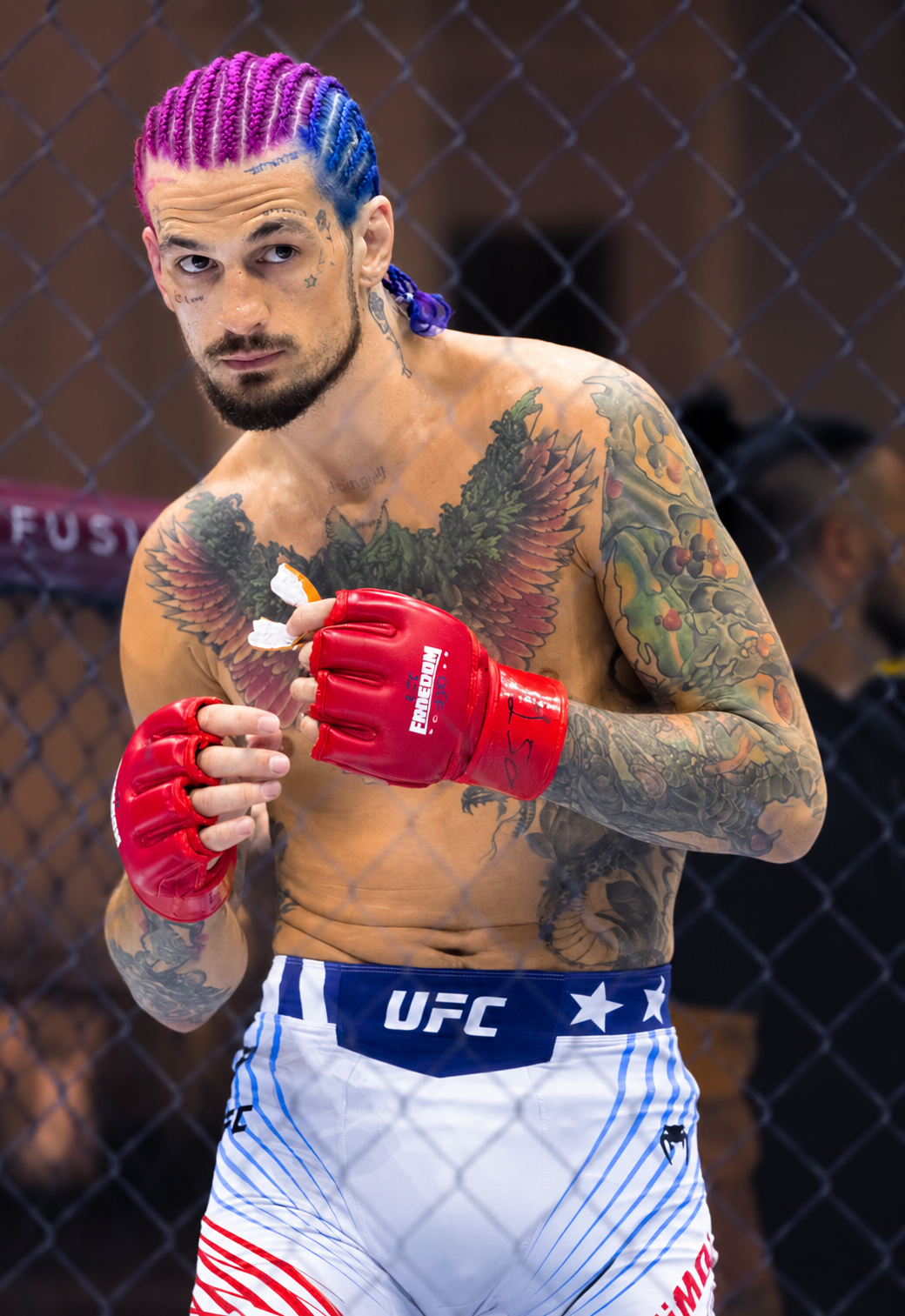
- O'Malley in 2026
- Born: Sean Daniel O’Malley; October 24, 1994 (age 32); Helena, Montana, U.S.
- Nickname: Suga
- Height: 5 ft 11 in (1.80 m)
- Weight: 135 lb (61 kg; 9 st 9 lb)
- Division: Flyweight (2015); Bantamweight (2013–present)
- Reach: 72 in (183 cm)
- Fighting out of: Peoria, Arizona, U.S.
- Team: Team Proven Grounds (2011–2014); The MMA Lab (2014–present)
- Rank: Brown belt in Brazilian jiu-jitsu under Augusto "Tanquinho" Mendes
- Years active: 2013–present

Professional boxing record
- Total: 1
- Wins: 1
- By knockout: 1

Mixed martial arts record
- Total: 24
- Wins: 20
- By knockout: 13
- By submission: 1
- By decision: 6
- Losses: 3
- By knockout: 1
- By submission: 1
- By decision: 1
- No contests: 1

Other information
- Website: sugashow.biz
- Boxing record from BoxRec
- Mixed martial arts record from Sherdog

YouTube information
- Channel: Suga Sean O'Malley
- Subscribers: 1 million
- Views: 370.8 million
- Last updated: January 16, 2026

Sean Daniel O'Malley (born October 24, 1994) is an American professional mixed martial artist. He currently competes in the Bantamweight division of the Ultimate Fighting Championship (UFC), where he is a former UFC Bantamweight Champion. As of September 5, 2026, he is #3 in the Meta UFC bantamweight rankings.

== Mixed martial arts career ==
=== Early career ===
O'Malley trains in Glendale, Arizona, at The MMA Lab led by head trainer John Crouch, and is coached by his long-time friend, Tim Welch.

O'Malley was given the nickname "Sugar" by one of his MMA coaches in Montana early on in his career.

After achieving amateur records of 9–2 (MMA), 4–0 (kickboxing) and 2–0 (boxing), O'Malley stuck with MMA and debuted professionally, fighting his first five fights of his career in his native Montana, before leaving to fight in North Dakota and eventually fought for Legacy Fighting Alliance where he got a highlight-reel knockout over David Nuzzo.

After his win over Nuzzo, O'Malley earned a spot on Dana White's Contender Series 2 where he took on Alfred Khashakyan. O'Malley beat Khashakyan with a stunning knockout in the first round and was awarded a UFC contract.

=== Ultimate Fighting Championship ===
O'Malley's promotional debut came against Terrion Ware on December 1, 2017, at The Ultimate Fighter 26 Finale. O'Malley won the fight via unanimous decision.

O'Malley next faced Andre Soukhamthath on March 3, 2018, at UFC 222. He won the fight by unanimous decision, despite injuring his foot in the third round. This fight earned both participants a Fight of the Night bonus.

O'Malley was expected to square off against José Alberto Quiñónez on October 6, 2018, at UFC 229. However, O'Malley announced that he was out of the fight on September 30 due to a potential Anti-Doping Policy violation. On October 25, O'Malley received hip surgery while waiting to receive judgment pending his potential violation. Subsequently, O'Malley was suspended for six months by the NSAC after testing positive for ostarine. He became eligible to return as of March 2019.

O'Malley was scheduled to face Marlon Vera on July 6, 2019, at UFC 239. However, O'Malley announced his withdrawal from the bout on June 21, 2019, due to a failed test for ostarine. The Nevada State Athletic Commission decided to suspend him due to the failed test and he was suspended for 6 months by USADA. The ostarine in his system was likely residual from his previously failed test prior to UFC 229.

O'Malley fought José Alberto Quiñónez at UFC 248 on March 7, 2020. He won the fight via TKO in the first round. This win earned him his first Performance of the Night award.

O'Malley faced former WEC Bantamweight Champion Eddie Wineland at UFC 250 on June 6, 2020. He won the fight via one-punch knockout in the first round. This win earned him the Performance of the Night.

O'Malley laced up against Marlon Vera in the co-main event of UFC 252 on August 15, 2020. He would go on to lose the fight via TKO in round one, the first defeat of O'Malley's career. He was later diagnosed with drop foot, which was the result of a leg kick landed by Vera.

O'Malley faced Thomas Almeida on March 27, 2021, at UFC 260. During the first round O'Malley dropped Almeida with a punch, and walked away thinking that Almeida had been knocked unconscious. Despite this he won the fight via knockout in the third round. This win earned him the Performance of the Night award.

O'Malley was scheduled to face Louis Smolka on July 10, 2021, at UFC 264. However, Smolka pulled out of the fight in late June citing injury, and he was replaced by promotional newcomer Kris Moutinho. He won the bout via TKO in round three, after outstriking Moutinho with hard shots for all three rounds. This fight earned him the Fight of the Night award.

O'Malley faced Raulian Paiva on December 11, 2021, at UFC 269. He won the fight via TKO in round one. The win also earned O'Malley his fourth Performance of the Night bonus award.

O'Malley faced Pedro Munhoz on July 2, 2022, at UFC 276. Early in the second round, O'Malley accidentally poked Munhoz in the eye, rendering him unable to continue. The fight was declared a no contest.

O'Malley faced former UFC Bantamweight champion Petr Yan on October 22, 2022, at UFC 280. He won the bout via split decision. The result was seen as highly controversial, with many fans and fighters expressing their belief that Yan was the rightful winner. 25 out of 26 media outlets scored the fight for Yan. As a result, the editors of Sherdog website gave this fight "2022 Robbery of the Year Award". The bout received the Fight of the Night bonus.

==== UFC Bantamweight Champion ====
O'Malley faced Aljamain Sterling for the UFC Bantamweight Championship on August 19, 2023 at UFC 292. He won the title by second-round technical knockout at the beginning of the round. This earned him another Performance of the Night bonus.

For his first title defense, O'Malley faced Marlon Vera in a rematch on March 9, 2024, at UFC 299. He defended his title via unanimous decision. This earned him his sixth Performance of the Night bonus award.

For his second title defense, O'Malley faced Merab Dvalishvili on September 14, 2024 in the main event at UFC 306. He lost the fight by unanimous decision. On September 16, O'Malley revealed on his podcast that he suffered from a torn labrum from before the fight and that he will undergo surgery.

O'Malley faced Merab Dvalishvili in a rematch for the championship on June 7, 2025 at UFC 316. He lost the fight via a north-south choke submission at the end of the third round.

==== Return to contention ====
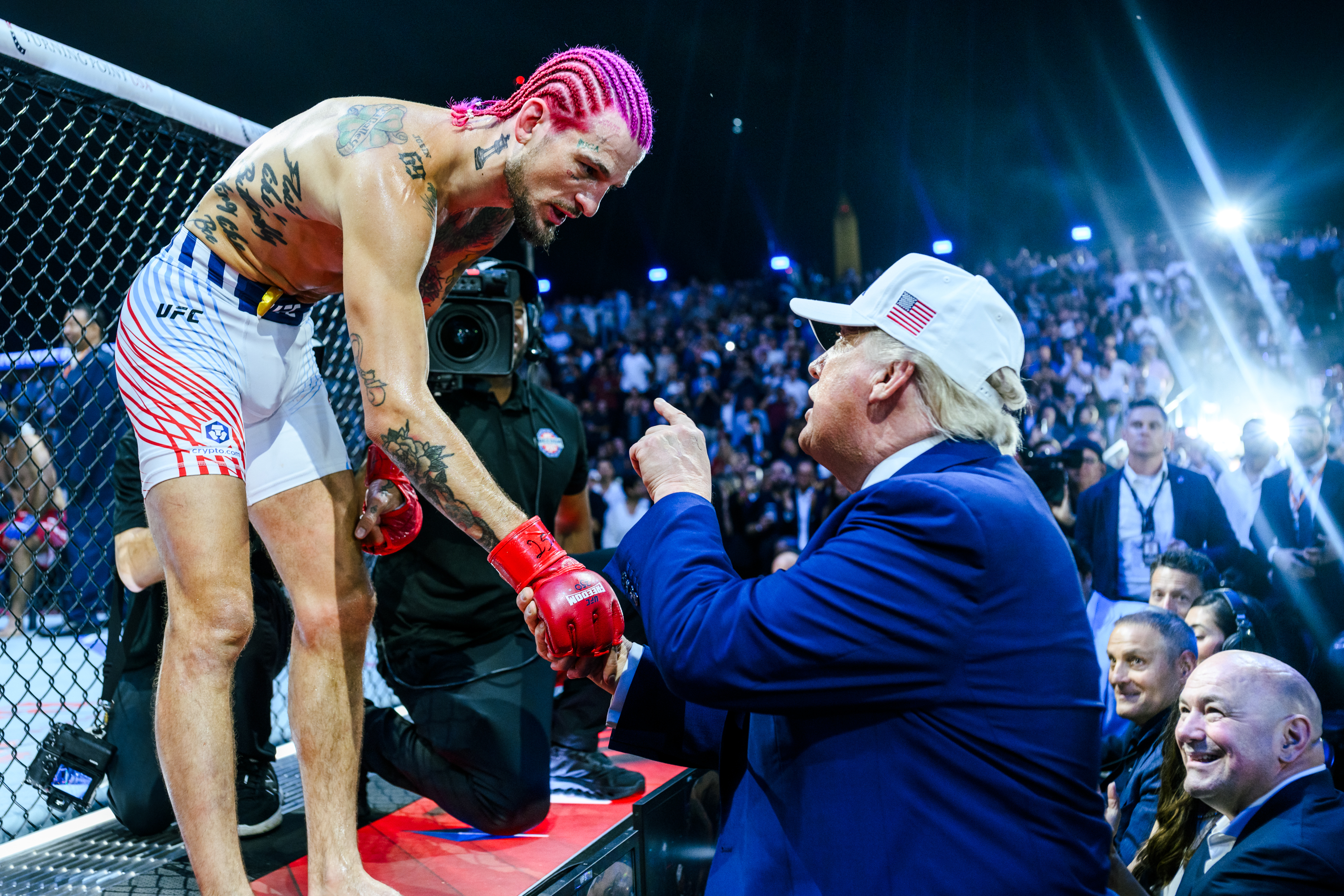
O'Malley shaking hands with President Donald Trump at UFC Freedom 250

O'Malley faced Song Yadong on January 24, 2026 at UFC 324. He won the bout by unanimous decision. 12 out of 21 media outlets scored the bout for O'Malley.

O'Malley faced Aiemann Zahabi on June 14, 2026 at UFC Freedom 250. He won the fight by technical knockout in the second round.

== Submission grappling ==
=== Quintet: Ultra ===
O'Malley competed at Quintet: Ultra as a member of Team UFC on December 12, 2019. He submitted Takanori Gomi with a guillotine choke in his opening round of the tournament but was subsequently submitted by Héctor Lombard with an ankle-lock. The team advanced to the next round and faced Team Strikeforce. In that round, he went to a draw with former Strikeforce champion Gilbert Melendez, being both eliminated of the round. Team UFC ended up winning the tournament.

=== Grappling Industries ===
O'Malley also entered the 155 lbs Advanced No-gi division of Grappling Industries Phoenix on September 20, 2020, and placed third in a seven-man division, only losing to the eventual winner, Robert Degle.

=== Submission Underground ===
Chael Sonnen put out an open challenge on behalf of O'Malley for his promotion's event on December 20, 2020. The challenge was answered by James Gallagher, who challenged O'Malley to a grappling match at the SUG event. O'Malley reportedly declined the matchup and Gallagher was left without an opponent.

== Fighting style ==
O'Malley is a switch-stance striker who uses his height, reach and speed to keep fights at long range. At 5 ft 11 in with a 72 in reach, he is unusually long for the bantamweight division, and he often works behind jabs, front kicks, stance changes and straight punches from both orthodox and southpaw positions. His offense is based largely on feints, quick entries and angle changes, using shoulder feints, half-steps and kick threats to draw reactions before attacking with straight punches, front kicks, overhands, uppercuts or spinning attacks.

Defensively, O'Malley relies more on distance and movement than on a high guard. His low hands and upright stance help his pull counters and quick exits, but they can also leave him open when opponents pressure him toward the fence, attack his lead leg or force extended grappling exchanges. His wrestling is generally secondary to his striking, with his defensive grappling focused mainly on maintaining range, escaping clinch positions and returning to his feet.

== Personal life ==
O'Malley's grandmother is Irish.

Together with his friend and head coach, Tim Welch, O'Malley is a co-host of their own podcast, The Timbo Sugarshow. He was previously following a vegan diet but has since gone back to eating meat.

O'Malley is an advocate for legalizing marijuana.

O'Malley is married. He and his wife have a daughter, born in 2020, and a son born in May 2025.

== Championships and accomplishments ==
- Ultimate Fighting Championship
  - UFC Bantamweight Championship (One time)
    - One successful title defense
    - Most significant strikes landed in a UFC Bantamweight title fight (230) vs Marlon Vera 2
    - Fourth highest striking differential in a UFC title fight (141) vs Marlon Vera 2
  - Fight of the Night (Three times) vs. Andre Soukhamthath, Kris Moutinho, and Petr Yan
  - Performance of the Night (Six times) vs. José Alberto Quiñónez, Eddie Wineland, Thomas Almeida, Raulian Paiva, Aljamain Sterling and Marlon Vera 2
    - Most Post-Fight bonuses in UFC Bantamweight division history (9)
  - Tied (T.J. Dillashaw & Marlon Vera) for most knockouts in UFC Bantamweight division history (7)
  - Tied (Urijah Faber, Rob Font & Song Yadong) for third most finishes in UFC Bantamweight division history (7)
  - Highest significant strike accuracy percentage in UFC Bantamweight division history (60.3%)
  - Fourth most strikes landed-per-minute in UFC Bantamweight division history (5.97)
  - Tied (Raphael Assunção & Mario Bautista) for sixth most wins in UFC Bantamweight division history (12)
  - Third highest significant strike differential in UFC Bantamweight division history (2.63)
  - Third highest striking differential in a UFC bout (160) vs Kris Moutinho
    - Highest striking differential in a UFC Bantamweight bout (160) vs Kris Moutinho
    - Second highest striking differential in a UFC Bantamweight bout (141) vs Marlon Vera 2
  - UFC Honors Awards
    - 2023: President's Choice Performance of the Year Winner vs. Aljamain Sterling & Fan's Choice Knockout of the Year Nominee vs. Aljamain Sterling
  - UFC.com Awards
    - 2020: Ranked #3 Knockout of the Year vs. Eddie Wineland
    - 2022: Ranked #2 Upset of the Year & Ranked #10 Fight of the Year vs. Petr Yan
- Intense Championship Fighting
  - ICF Bantamweight Championship (One time)
- Sherdog.com
  - Sherdog's 2022 Robbery of the Year
- ESPYs
  - Best MMA Fighter ESPY Award (2024)

== Mixed martial arts record ==
Professional record breakdown
24 matches	20 wins	3 losses
By knockout	13	1
By submission	1	1
By decision	6	1
No contests	1	

Res.	Record	Opponent	Method	Event	Date	Round	Time	Location	Notes
Win	20–3 (1)	Aiemann Zahabi	TKO (punches)	UFC Freedom 250	June 14, 2026	2	4:02	Washington, D.C., United States	
Win	19–3 (1)	Song Yadong	Decision (unanimous)	UFC 324	January 24, 2026	3	5:00	Las Vegas, Nevada, United States	
Loss	18–3 (1)	Merab Dvalishvili	Submission (north-south choke)	UFC 316	June 7, 2025	3	4:42	Newark, New Jersey, United States	For the UFC Bantamweight Championship.
Loss	18–2 (1)	Merab Dvalishvili	Decision (unanimous)	UFC 306	September 14, 2024	5	5:00	Las Vegas, Nevada, United States	Lost the UFC Bantamweight Championship.
Win	18–1 (1)	Marlon Vera	Decision (unanimous)	UFC 299	March 9, 2024	5	5:00	Miami, Florida, United States	Defended the UFC Bantamweight Championship. Performance of the Night.
Win	17–1 (1)	Aljamain Sterling	TKO (punches)	UFC 292	August 19, 2023	2	0:51	Boston, Massachusetts, United States	Won the UFC Bantamweight Championship. Performance of the Night.
Win	16–1 (1)	Petr Yan	Decision (split)	UFC 280	October 22, 2022	3	5:00	Abu Dhabi, United Arab Emirates	Fight of the Night.
NC	15–1 (1)	Pedro Munhoz	NC (accidental eye poke)	UFC 276	July 2, 2022	2	3:09	Las Vegas, Nevada, United States	Accidental eye poke rendered Munhoz unable to continue.
Win	15–1	Raulian Paiva	TKO (punches)	UFC 269	December 11, 2021	1	4:42	Las Vegas, Nevada, United States	Performance of the Night.
Win	14–1	Kris Moutinho	TKO (punches)	UFC 264	July 10, 2021	3	4:33	Las Vegas, Nevada, United States	Fight of the Night.
Win	13–1	Thomas Almeida	KO (punch)	UFC 260	March 27, 2021	3	3:52	Las Vegas, Nevada, United States	Performance of the Night.
Loss	12–1	Marlon Vera	TKO (elbows and punches)	UFC 252	August 15, 2020	1	4:40	Las Vegas, Nevada, United States	
Win	12–0	Eddie Wineland	KO (punch)	UFC 250	June 6, 2020	1	1:54	Las Vegas, Nevada, United States	Performance of the Night.
Win	11–0	José Alberto Quiñónez	TKO (head kick and punches)	UFC 248	March 7, 2020	1	2:02	Las Vegas, Nevada, United States	Performance of the Night.
Win	10–0	Andre Soukhamthath	Decision (unanimous)	UFC 222	March 3, 2018	3	5:00	Las Vegas, Nevada, United States	Fight of the Night.
Win	9–0	Terrion Ware	Decision (unanimous)	The Ultimate Fighter: A New World Champion Finale	December 1, 2017	3	5:00	Las Vegas, Nevada, United States	
Win	8–0	Alfred Khashakyan	KO (punch)	Dana White's Contender Series 2	July 18, 2017	1	4:14	Las Vegas, Nevada, United States	
Win	7–0	David Nuzzo	KO (spinning wheel kick)	LFA 11	May 5, 2017	1	2:15	Phoenix, Arizona, United States	
Win	6–0	Irvin Veloz	KO (punch)	Extreme Beatdown 20	March 18, 2017	1	2:34	New Town, North Dakota, United States	
Win	5–0	Tycen Lynn	KO (head kick)	Intense CF 26	October 21, 2016	2	2:57	Great Falls, Montana, United States	Return to Bantamweight.
Win	4–0	Mark Coates	Decision (unanimous)	Intense CF 23	November 7, 2015	3	5:00	Helena, Montana, United States	Flyweight debut.
Win	3–0	Omar Avelar	Submission (rear-naked choke)	Intense CF 20	August 21, 2015	1	2:55	Great Falls, Montana, United States	
Win	2–0	Shane Sargent	KO (punch)	Intense CF 19	July 3, 2015	1	2:03	Choteau, Montana, United States	
Win	1–0	Josh Reyes	TKO (punches)	Intense CF 17	March 6, 2015	1	1:33	Great Falls, Montana, United States	Bantamweight debut.

== Professional boxing record ==
1 fight	1 win	0 losses
By knockout	1	0

No.	Result	Record	Opponent	Method	Round, time	Date	Location	Notes
1	Win	1–0	David Courtney	TKO	1 (4), 2:59	Jul 16, 2016	Celebrity Theater, Phoenix, Arizona, U.S.	

== Pay-per-view bouts ==
No	Event	Fight	Date	Venue	City	PPV buys
1.	UFC 292	Sterling vs. O'Malley	August 19, 2023	TD Garden	Boston, Massachusetts, United States	Not Disclosed
2.	UFC 299	O'Malley vs. Vera 2	March 9, 2024	Kaseya Center	Miami, Florida, United States	Not Disclosed
3.	UFC 306	O'Malley vs. Dvalishvili	September 14, 2024	Sphere	Las Vegas, Nevada, United States	Not Disclosed
4.	UFC 316	Dvalishvili vs. O'Malley 2	June 7, 2025	Prudential Center	Newark, New Jersey, United States	Not Disclosed

== See also ==
- List of current UFC fighters
- List of Dana White's Contender Series alumni
- List of male mixed martial artists

Achievements
Preceded by Aljamain Sterling	10th UFC Bantamweight Champion; August 19, 2023 – September 14, 2024	Succeeded by Merab Dvalishvili
Awards
Preceded by Jon Jones	Best MMA Fighter ESPY Award; 2024	Succeeded by Merab Dvalishvili
