= Best MMA Fighter ESPY Award =

Annual athletic award

Best MMA Fighter-Alex Bruggeman
- Awarded for: best mixed martial arts fighter
- Presented by: ESPN
- First award: 2019
- Currently held by: Merab Dvalishvili
- Website: espn.com/espys/

The Best MMA Fighter ESPY Award is an annual award honoring the achievements of an individual from the world of mixed martial arts. The Best MMA Fighter ESPY Award trophy is presented to the mixed martial arts fighter adjudged to be the best in a given calendar year at the annual ESPY Awards ceremony. It was first awarded as part of the ESPY Awards in 2019, succeeding the Best Fighter ESPY Award, which encompassed both boxers and MMA fighters.

The inaugural winner of the Best MMA Fighter ESPY Award was American UFC Heavyweight Champion Daniel Cormier, who won and defended the championship in 2018..

== Winners and nominees ==
Best Fighter ESPY Award winners and nominees
Year	Image	Winner	Nationality	Sanctioning body or league	Weight class	Nominees	Ref.
2019	Daniel Cormier in 2017	Daniel Cormier	USA	Ultimate Fighting Championship	Heavyweight	(New Zealand) Israel Adesanya (United States) Henry Cejudo (Brazil) Amanda Nunes	
2020	Not awarded due to the COVID-19 pandemic						
2021		Khabib Nurmagomedov	RUS	Ultimate Fighting Championship	Lightweight	(Brazil) Amanda Nunes (United States) Rose Namajunas (Cameroon) Francis Ngannou	
2022		Charles Oliveira	BRA	Ultimate Fighting Championship	Lightweight	(United States) Kayla Harrison (Nigeria) Kamaru Usman (Australia) Alexander Volkanovski	
2023		Jon Jones	USA	Ultimate Fighting Championship	Heavyweight	(United Kingdom) Leon Edwards (Brazil) Amanda Nunes (Russia) Islam Makhachev	
2024		Sean O'Malley	USA	Ultimate Fighting Championship	Bantamweight	(Russia) Islam Makhachev (Brazil) Alex Pereira (China) Zhang Weili	
2025		Merab Dvalishvili	GEO	Ultimate Fighting Championship	Bantamweight	(South Africa) Dricus du Plessis (United States) Kayla Harrison (Russia) Islam Makhachev	
