= Petr Yan =

Russian mixed martial artist (born 1993)

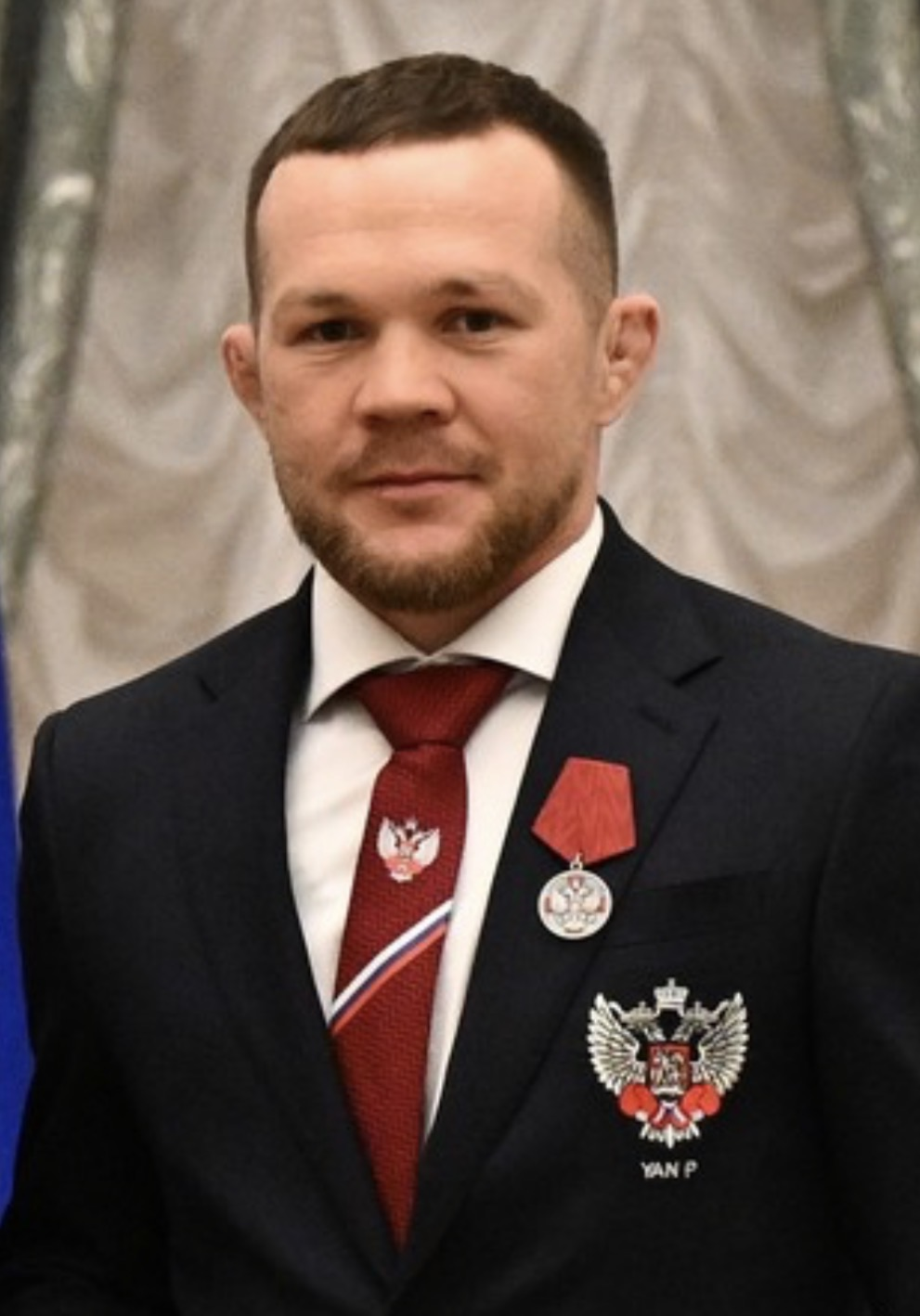
- Yan in 2026
- Born: Petr Evgenyevich Yan; 11 February 1993 (age 33); Dudinka, Krasnoyarsk, Russia
- Native name: Пётр Ян
- Nickname: No Mercy
- Height: 5 ft 7.5 in (171 cm)
- Weight: 135 lb (61 kg; 9.6 st)
- Division: Bantamweight
- Reach: 67 in (170 cm)
- Fighting out of: Yekaterinburg, Russia
- Team: Tiger Muay Thai; Archangel Michael Fight Club; American Top Team
- Rank: Master of Sport in Boxing; Master of Sport in MMA; Blue belt in Brazilian Jiu-Jitsu
- Years active: 2014–present

Mixed martial arts record
- Total: 26
- Wins: 21
- By knockout: 7
- By submission: 1
- By decision: 13
- Losses: 5
- By decision: 4
- By disqualification: 1

Other information
- Spouse: Julia Yan
- Children: 2
- Mixed martial arts record from Sherdog

Petr Evgenyevich Yan (Russian: Пётр Евге́ньевич Я́н, romanized: Pyotr Yevgenyevich Yan; born 11 February 1993) is a Russian professional mixed martial artist. He currently competes in the Bantamweight division of the Ultimate Fighting Championship (UFC), where he is the current and two-time UFC Bantamweight Champion. He is also a former interim Bantamweight Champion. Yan formerly fought in Absolute Championship Berkut where he is a former ACB Bantamweight Champion. As of 22 September 2026, he is #4 in the UFC men's pound-for-pound rankings.

== Early life and master of sport in boxing ==
Yan was born to a father of mixed Chinese (paternal) and Georgian-Russian (maternal) descent and a Russian mother. In sixth grade, Yan began training in ITF taekwondo and often fought in the streets and at the school in his area, so his family often moved to try and prevent this. Yan's older brother trained in boxing in the city of Dudinka, Krasnoyarsk Krai, and Petr wanted to learn how to box too. But his elder brother initially refused to take Petr along with him, so Petr decided to sneak and follow his brother to go to learn the sport. From then on, Petr went on to train in boxing for 8 years and achieved the rank of Master of Sport in boxing in the 64 kg weight category. Yan graduated from the Siberian Academy of Physical Culture in the city of Omsk with a degree in Physical Culture and Sport.

== Mixed martial arts career ==
=== Early career ===
Yan debuted in MMA at the Eurasian Fighting Championship - Baikal Fight in December 2014. He won via third-round knockout over Murad Bakiev, who was also a debutant. In 2015, Yan signed a contract with the Russian promotion Absolute Championship Berkut. He was said to have gained many fans after his debut with the promotion where he fought Brazilian fighter Renato Velame, who at the time, already had 26 fights in his MMA career. However, Yan won this fight by decision. In Yan's third fight, he fought and beat Kharon Orzumiev by first-round submission in just 47 seconds. In his following fight, Yan knocked out Artur Mirzakhanyan in the first round which was held at Professional Fight Night 10: Russia Cup.

=== Absolute Championship Berkut ===
On 24 October 2015, Yan faced Murad Kalamov and won the fight by unanimous decision. The win granted Yan the opportunity to fight Magomed Magomedov for the championship belt in the bantamweight division.

Yan lost his first fight when he faced Magomed Magomedov on 26 March 2016 in Moscow at ACB 32: "The Battle of Lions". After going all five rounds, Magomedov won the fight by split decision and won the title at bantamweight; however, many felt that Yan had won the fight, including ACB president, Mairbek Khasiev who promised to book a rematch. Although Yan lost, this fight was voted as ACB's best fight of the year in 2016.

Following his first professional loss, Yan returned to face English mixed martial artist Ed Arthur at ACB 41: Path to Triumph, in Sochi. He won the fight by unanimous decision.

In the spring of 2017, Yan was scheduled to have a rematch with Magomed Magomedov on 15 April at ACB 57: Payback in Moscow. This time, Yan exacted revenge and defeated Magomedov by unanimous decision after fighting all five hard-fought rounds. He won the decision and ultimately was crowned the ACB bantamweight champion.

Following his win, Yan returned in September 2017 to fight Brazilian contender Matheus Mattos at ACB: 71 in Moscow. After winning the first two rounds, Yan caught Mattos with a left uppercut which caused Mattos to fall to his back, making the referee stop the fight. He successfully defended his bantamweight title by third-round knockout.

=== Ultimate Fighting Championship ===
Following his first title defense, Yan signed a contract with the Ultimate Fighting Championship in January 2018.

Yan made his promotional debut against Teruto Ishihara on 23 June 2018 at UFC Fight Night 132. He won the fight via technical knockout in the first round.

Yan was briefly scheduled to face top-14 UFC rankings Douglas Silva de Andrade on 15 September 2018 at the UFC Fight Night 136. However, Andrade pulled out of the fight on 9 August citing a foot injury, and he was replaced by Jin Soo Son. At weigh-ins, Son weighed one pound over the bantamweight non-title fight limit of 136 pounds and he was fined 20 percent of his purse to Yan. Yan won the fight by unanimous decision. This win earned him the Fight of the Night award.

A bantamweight bout was rescheduled between Yan and Douglas Silva de Andrade for UFC 232 on 29 December 2018. He won the fight via technical knockout in round two after de Andrade's corner stopped the fight.

On 10 January 2019, Yan revealed on social media that he had signed a new, four-fight contract with the UFC. Yan faced John Dodson on 23 February 2019 at UFC Fight Night 145. Yan won the fight by unanimous decision, after landing hard punches and kicks whilst Dodson's back was against the cage.

Despite his previous, few months old contract, Yan signed a new six-fight contract which was offered to him immediately after his win against Dodson.

Yan faced Jimmie Rivera on 8 June 2019 at UFC 238. He won the fight by unanimous decision.

On 26 June, it was reported that Yan had to undergo surgery due to synovitis in his left elbow.

Yan faced Urijah Faber on 14 December 2019 at UFC 245. After largely dominating the striking exchanges and knocking Faber down in the second round, Yan ultimately won the fight via knockout in the third round. This win earned him the Performance of the Night award.

After the fight with Faber, Yan was critical of bantamweight champion, Henry Cejudo, stating that he is being ducked by Cejudo. "I think it's pretty obvious he is ducking me and doing everything he can to avoid fighting me. All this talk about him wanting a bigger name is bullshit, he just wants easier fight for himself."

==== Bantamweight Championship ====
After Cejudo's title defense against Dominick Cruz at UFC 249, Cejudo announced he would be retiring from mixed martial arts competition vacating the UFC Bantamweight Championship. Yan then faced former WEC and UFC Featherweight Champion José Aldo for the vacant title on 12 July 2020 at UFC 251. He won the fight via technical knockout in the fifth round.

Yan was expected to make his first title defense against Aljamain Sterling on 12 December 2020 at UFC 256. However, it was announced on 22 November that the bout was cancelled from the UFC 256 card and the bout was rescheduled on 6 March 2021 at UFC 259. Yan lost the fight by disqualification in the fourth round due to an illegal knee, losing the UFC Bantamweight Championship. Two judges had Yan up 29–28 and one had Sterling up 29–28 before the illegal knee.

A rematch with Sterling was expected to take place on 30 October 2021 at UFC 267. However, on 25 September, Sterling withdrew from the contest due to lingering neck issues. Cory Sandhagen stepped in as replacement with the bout being for the interim UFC Bantamweight Championship. Yan won the bout via unanimous decision. This bout earned the Fight of the Night award.

A title unification rematch with Aljamain Sterling was scheduled to take place on 5 March 2022 at UFC 272. However, on 11 January 2022, it was announced that the bout was pushed back to UFC 273 on 9 April. Yan lost the bout via a split decision. The fight also earned him third place in the "Fan Bonus of the Night" award.

==== Post-championship fights ====
Yan faced Sean O'Malley on 22 October 2022 at UFC 280. He lost the bout via split decision. The decision was seen as highly controversial with many fans and fighters adamantly expressing their belief that Yan was the rightful winner. 25 out of 26 media outlets scored the bout in favor of Yan. The bout received the Fight of the Night bonus. However, the editors of Sherdog website gave this fight "2022 Robbery of the Year Award".

Yan faced Merab Dvalishvili on 11 March 2023 at UFC Fight Night: Yan vs. Dvalishvili. He lost the fight via unanimous decision.

Yan was scheduled to headline UFC Fight Night 233 against Song Yadong on 9 December 2023. However, Yan withdrew from the bout citing an injury and was replaced by Chris Gutiérrez, whom Song would defeat. A bout with Song was rebooked for 9 March 2024, at UFC 299. A month prior to the event, Yan suffered a groin muscle injury, and in the first round of the fight, Yan tore his ACL and meniscus, requiring a change of strategy. Despite the injuries, Yan won the bout by unanimous decision.

Yan faced former two-time UFC Flyweight Champion Deiveson Figueiredo on 23 November 2024 in the main event at UFC Fight Night 248. He won the fight by unanimous decision.

Yan faced Marcus McGhee on 26 July 2025 at UFC on ABC 9. He won the fight by unanimous decision.

==== Second title reign ====
Yan faced Merab Dvalishvili in a rematch for the UFC Bantamweight Championship on 6 December 2025 at UFC 323. He won the championship by unanimous decision. This fight earned him another Fight of the Night award.

Yan defended his title against Dvalishvili in a trilogy bout on 24 October 2026 at UFC 333. He won the fight by unanimous decision. This fight earned him a $100,000 Fight of the Night award.

== Fighting style ==
Yan is primarily a switch-stance striker whose game is built around compact boxing, pressure footwork and a layered high guard. He holds the rank of Master of Sport in boxing and a blue belt in Brazilian jiu-jitsu, while his professional style is generally associated with precision striking, diverse offense and strong cardio. Rather than relying only on constant output, Yan often builds his offense through patient reads, small steps, stance changes and hand fighting, using these tools to close space, limit exits and force opponents to reset before attacking with combinations or counters.

A central feature of Yan's defense is his high guard, which he combines with upper-body movement, subtle pivots and counterpunching. This allows him to stay close enough to answer after blocking or parrying strikes, while still advancing behind measured pressure. His ringcraft is also based on controlling the opponent's movement: he uses short advances instead of wide chases, cuts off angles near the fence and fires when opponents pause, reset or try to turn out of exchanges.

Although boxing is the base of his stand-up game, Yan also incorporates kicks, knees, elbows and clinch strikes. At close range, he mixes body-head punching combinations with dirty boxing, collar ties, wrist control, knees and elbows, and he is especially effective when striking on the break.

In grappling exchanges, Yan is not primarily a submission-oriented fighter, but his wrestling is an important part of his overall game. He uses trips, throws and mat returns from clinch positions, often after catching kicks or gaining body-lock control, and his defensive wrestling relies heavily on balance, hand fighting and forearm frames while sprawling or working along the fence. CBS Sports lists his takedown defense at 86%, alongside a takedown average of 1.7 per 15 minutes.

== Personal life ==
Yan is an Orthodox Christian; he and his wife have two sons. During Russia's 2022 invasion of Ukraine, Yan posted an image on social media of the countries' flags and a dove of peace. Yan was also awarded the Order "For Merit to the Fatherland" (Order II) on April 22, 2026.

== Championships and accomplishments ==
=== Mixed martial arts ===
- Ultimate Fighting Championship
  - UFC Bantamweight Championship (Two times, current)
    - One successful title defense (second reign)
  - Interim UFC Bantamweight Championship (One time)
    - Tied (Dominick Cruz, Renan Barão, Aljamain Sterling & Merab Dvalishvili) for second most UFC Bantamweight title fight wins (4)
  - Fight of the Night (Five times) vs. Jin Soo Son, Cory Sandhagen, Sean O'Malley & Merab Dvalishvili 2 & 3
  - Performance of the Night (One time) vs. Urijah Faber
  - Tied (Raphael Assunção & Renan Barão) for the fourth longest win streak in UFC Bantamweight division history (7)
  - Tied (Cody Garbrandt) for third most knockdowns in UFC Bantamweight division history (10)
  - Most significant strikes landed in UFC Bantamweight division history (1584)
  - Third most total fight time in UFC Bantamweight division history (5:07:04)
    - Second most total strikes landed in UFC Bantamweight division history (2048)
  - Third longest average fight time in UFC Bantamweight division history (18:04)
  - Tied (Merab Dvalishvili & T.J. Dillashaw) for third most wins in UFC Bantamweight division history (13)
  - Tied (Raphael Assunção) for second most decision wins in UFC Bantamweight division history (9) (behind Merab Dvalishvili)
  - Tied (Aljamain Sterling) for seventh most takedowns landed in UFC Bantamweight division history (32)
  - Holds wins over three former UFC champions — José Aldo, Deiveson Figueiredo & Merab Dvalishvili x2
  - UFC Honors Awards
    - 2021: President's Choice Fight of the Year Nominee vs. Cory Sandhagen
  - UFC.com Awards
    - 2018: Ranked #5 Newcomer of the Year (Tied with Sodiq Yusuff)
    - 2019: Top 10 Fighter of the Year
    - 2021: Ranked #4 Fight of the Year vs. Cory Sandhagen
    - 2022: Ranked #10 Fight of the Year vs. Sean O'Malley
- Crypto.com
  - Fan Bonus of the Night vs. Aljamain Sterling
- Absolute Championship Berkut
  - ACB Bantamweight Championship (One time)
    - One successful title defense
  - ACB Bantamweight Grand Prix 2015 Champion
- Fight Matrix
  - 2025 Most Noteworthy Match of the Year vs. Merab Dvalishvili 2 at UFC 323
- MMADNA.nl
  - 2018 European Newcomer of the Year
- MMA Sucka
  - 2019 UFC Breakout Star of the Year
- Sherdog
  - 2022 Robbery of the Year
  - 2025 Comeback Fighter of the Year
  - 2025 Upset of the Year vs. Merab Dvalishvili 2 at UFC 323
- MMA Mania
  - 2025 #5 Ranked Fighter of the Year
- MMA Fighting
  - 2025 #3 Ranked Fighter of the Year
  - 2025 #5 Ranked Fight of the Year vs. Merab Dvalishvili 2 at UFC 323
  - 2025 Performance of the Year vs. Merab Dvalishvili 2 at UFC 323
  - 2025 Second Team MMA All-Star
- CBS Sports
  - 2025 UFC Fighter of the Year
- Uncrowned
  - 2025 Male Fighter of the Year

== Mixed martial arts record ==
Professional record breakdown
26 matches	21 wins	5 losses
By knockout	7	0
By submission	1	0
By decision	13	4
By disqualification	0	1

Res.	Record	Opponent	Method	Event	Date	Round	Time	Location	Notes
Win	21–5	Merab Dvalishvili	Decision (unanimous)	UFC 333	24 October 2026	5	5:00	Abu Dhabi, United Arab Emirates	Defended the UFC Bantamweight Championship. Fight of the Night.
Win	20–5	Merab Dvalishvili	Decision (unanimous)	UFC 323	6 December 2025	5	5:00	Las Vegas, Nevada, United States	Won the UFC Bantamweight Championship. Fight of the Night.
Win	19–5	Marcus McGhee	Decision (unanimous)	UFC on ABC: Whittaker vs. de Ridder	26 July 2025	3	5:00	Abu Dhabi, United Arab Emirates	
Win	18–5	Deiveson Figueiredo	Decision (unanimous)	UFC Fight Night: Yan vs. Figueiredo	23 November 2024	5	5:00	Macau SAR, China	
Win	17–5	Song Yadong	Decision (unanimous)	UFC 299	9 March 2024	3	5:00	Miami, Florida, United States	
Loss	16–5	Merab Dvalishvili	Decision (unanimous)	UFC Fight Night: Yan vs. Dvalishvili	11 March 2023	5	5:00	Las Vegas, Nevada, United States	
Loss	16–4	Sean O'Malley	Decision (split)	UFC 280	22 October 2022	3	5:00	Abu Dhabi, United Arab Emirates	Fight of the Night.
Loss	16–3	Aljamain Sterling	Decision (split)	UFC 273	9 April 2022	5	5:00	Jacksonville, Florida, United States	For the UFC Bantamweight Championship.
Win	16–2	Cory Sandhagen	Decision (unanimous)	UFC 267	30 October 2021	5	5:00	Abu Dhabi, United Arab Emirates	Won the interim UFC Bantamweight Championship. Fight of the Night.
Loss	15–2	Aljamain Sterling	DQ (illegal knee)	UFC 259	6 March 2021	4	4:29	Las Vegas, Nevada, United States	Lost the UFC Bantamweight Championship.
Win	15–1	José Aldo	TKO (punches)	UFC 251	12 July 2020	5	3:24	Abu Dhabi, United Arab Emirates	Won the vacant UFC Bantamweight Championship.
Win	14–1	Urijah Faber	KO (head kick)	UFC 245	14 December 2019	3	0:43	Las Vegas, Nevada, United States	Performance of the Night.
Win	13–1	Jimmie Rivera	Decision (unanimous)	UFC 238	8 June 2019	3	5:00	Chicago, Illinois, United States	
Win	12–1	John Dodson	Decision (unanimous)	UFC Fight Night: Błachowicz vs. Santos	23 February 2019	3	5:00	Prague, Czech Republic	
Win	11–1	Douglas Silva de Andrade	TKO (corner stoppage)	UFC 232	29 December 2018	2	5:00	Inglewood, California, United States	
Win	10–1	Son Jin-soo	Decision (unanimous)	UFC Fight Night: Hunt vs. Oleinik	15 September 2018	3	5:00	Moscow, Russia	Catchweight (137 lb) bout; Son missed weight. Fight of the Night.
Win	9–1	Teruto Ishihara	KO (punches)	UFC Fight Night: Cowboy vs. Edwards	23 June 2018	1	3:28	Kallang, Singapore	
Win	8–1	Matheus Mattos	TKO (punches)	ACB 71	23 September 2017	3	2:27	Moscow, Russia	Defended the ACB Bantamweight Championship.
Win	7–1	Magomed Magomedov	Decision (unanimous)	ACB 57	15 April 2017	5	5:00	Moscow, Russia	Won the ACB Bantamweight Championship.
Win	6–1	Ed Arthur	Decision (unanimous)	ACB 41	15 July 2016	3	5:00	Sochi, Russia	
Loss	5–1	Magomed Magomedov	Decision (split)	ACB 32	26 March 2016	5	5:00	Moscow, Russia	For the inaugural ACB Bantamweight Championship.
Win	5–0	Murad Kalamov	Decision (unanimous)	ACB 24	24 October 2015	3	5:00	Moscow, Russia	Won the 2015 ACB Bantamweight Grand Prix.
Win	4–0	Artur Mirzakhanyan	TKO (punches)	Professional Fight Night 10: Russia Cup	5 July 2015	1	2:40	Omsk, Russia	
Win	3–0	Kharon Orzumiev	Submission (guillotine choke)	ACB 19	30 May 2015	1	0:47	Kaliningrad, Russia	2015 ACB Bantamweight Grand Prix Semifinal.
Win	2–0	Renato Velame	Decision (unanimous)	ACB 14	28 February 2015	3	5:00	Grozny, Russia	2015 ACB Bantamweight Grand Prix Quarterfinal.
Win	1–0	Murad Bakiev	KO (punch)	Siberian League: Baikal Cup 2014	20 December 2014	3	0:45	Irkutsk, Russia	Bantamweight debut.

== Pay-per-view bouts ==
No	Event	Fight	Date	Venue	City	PPV buys
1.	UFC 323	Dvalishvili vs. Yan 2	6 December 2025	T-Mobile Arena	Las Vegas, Nevada, United States	Not Disclosed

== See also ==
- List of current UFC fighters
- List of male mixed martial artists

Awards and achievements
Vacant Title last held by Henry Cejudo	8th UFC Bantamweight Champion; 12 July 2020 - 5 March 2021	Succeeded by Aljamain Sterling
Vacant Title last held by Renan Barão	2nd UFC Interim Bantamweight Champion; 30 October 2021 – 9 April 2022	Vacant
Preceded by Merab Dvalishvili	12th UFC Bantamweight Champion; 6 December 2025 - present	Incumbent
