= Cody Stamann =

American mixed martial artist

- Born: November 9, 1989 (age 36); Sparta, Michigan, United States
- Other names: Mr. Wonderful; The Spartan
- Nationality: American
- Height: 5 ft 5 in (165 cm)
- Weight: 135 lb (61 kg; 9 st 9 lb)
- Division: Featherweight; Bantamweight
- Reach: 64 in (163 cm)
- Fighting out of: Sparta, Michigan, United States (formerly); Las Vegas, Nevada, United States (2019–present)
- Team: Xtreme Couture (2019–present)
- Trainer: Daron Cruickshank (formerly)
- Rank: Blue belt in Brazilian Jiu-Jitsu
- Wrestling: NCAA Division II Wrestling
- Years active: 2010–present

Professional boxing record
- Total: 1
- Losses: 1

Mixed martial arts record
- Total: 31
- Wins: 22
- By knockout: 7
- By submission: 2
- By decision: 13
- Losses: 8
- By submission: 3
- By decision: 5
- Draws: 1

Other information
- University: Grand Valley State University
- Boxing record from BoxRec
- Mixed martial arts record from Sherdog

Cody Stamann (born November 9, 1989) is an American mixed martial artist who competed in the Featherweight division of the Ultimate Fighting Championship.

== Background ==
Stamann was born in Grand Rapids, Michigan and attended Grand Valley State University, where he competed in wrestling. Stamann also began boxing in high school at the age of 16. When MMA was introduced to Michigan, he was encouraged by his mother to transition to train MMA as a way to keep him out of trouble in life.

== Mixed martial arts career ==
=== Early career ===
Stamann amassed an amateur record of 19–1 with seven titles before turning professional in 2010. After compiling a professional record of 14–1, fighting mostly in the Midwest region of United States for Knockout Promotions, Michiana Fight League, Triple X Cagefighting and Hoosier Fight Club, prior to joining the UFC, as well as Warrior Xtreme Cagefighting (WXC), Michigans oldest and largest MMA league.

=== Ultimate Fighting Championship ===
In his UFC debut, Stamann faced Terrion Ware on July 8, 2017, at UFC 213 in Las Vegas. He won the fight by unanimous decision.

Stamann faced Tom Duquesnoy at UFC 216 on October 7, 2017. He won the fight by split decision. After watching the fight, Stamann commented that Daniel Cormier and Joe Rogan were biased on his fight commentary, where the commentators mentioned Duquesnoy more in the first two rounds even though Stamann felt he was beating Duquesnoy.

Stamann faced Bryan Caraway on March 4, 2018, at UFC 222. He won the fight by split decision.

Stamann faced Aljamain Sterling on September 8, 2018, at UFC 228. He lost the fight via submission in the second round.

Stamann faced Alejandro Pérez on March 2, 2019, at UFC 235. He won the fight by unanimous decision.

Stamann was expected to face Rob Font on June 22, 2019, at UFC on ESPN+ 12. However, on June 5, 2019, it was reported that Stamman had pulled out of the event due to injury and he was replaced by John Lineker.

After the fight with Font didn't materialize, Stamann relocated to Las Vegas and started training at Xtreme Couture.

Stamann faced Song Yadong on December 7, 2019, at UFC on ESPN 7. After three round fight, the fight ended with a majority draw.

Stamann was expected to face Raoni Barcelos on March 28, 2020, at UFC on ESPN: Ngannou vs. Rozenstruik. Due to the COVID-19 pandemic, the event was eventually postponed. Instead, Stamann faced Brian Kelleher on June 6, 2020, at UFC 250 in a featherweight bout. He won the bout via unanimous decision.

Stamann faced Jimmie Rivera in a featherweight bout on July 16, 2020, at UFC on ESPN: Kattar vs. Ige. He lost the fight via unanimous decision.

Stamann was expected to face Merab Dvalishvili on December 5, 2020, at UFC on ESPN 19. However, on October 22, it was announced that Stamann had pulled out due to undisclosed reasons. The bout between Dvalishvili and Stamann was rescheduled for UFC Fight Night 184 on February 6, 2021. In turn, in mid January, Dvalishvili was forced to pull out from the bout due to the struggle of the after-effects of a COVID-19 complication, and he was replaced by Andre Ewell. After a positive test for COVID, Ewell was pulled from the event and replaced with UFC newcomer Askar Askarov, with the contest expected to take place at featherweight. On the day of the event, Askar was not medically cleared and the bout was cancelled. The bout between Dvalishvili and Stamann was rescheduled again to May 1, 2021, at UFC on ESPN: Reyes vs. Procházka. Stamann lost the bout via unanimous decision.

Stamann faced Said Nurmagomedov on January 22, 2022, at UFC 270. Stamann lost the fight via submission in the first round.

Stamann faced Eddie Wineland on June 18, 2022, at UFC on ESPN 37. He won the fight via TKO less than a minute into round one. This win earned him the Performance of the Night award.

Stamann faced Luan Luiz Lacerda on January 21, 2023, at UFC 283. He won the fight via unanimous decision.

Stamann faced Douglas Silva de Andrade on May 13, 2023 at UFC on ABC 4. He lost the bout via unanimous decision.

Stamann faced Taylor Lapilus on June 8, 2024 at UFC on ESPN 57. He lost the fight by unanimous decision.

Stamann faced Da'Mon Blackshear on November 9, 2024 at UFC Fight Night 247. He lost the fight via a rear-naked choke submission in the first round.

On February 27, 2025, it was reported that Stamann was removed from the UFC roster.

== Championships and accomplishments ==
- Ultimate Fighting Championship
  - Performance of the Night (One time) vs. Eddie Wineland
  - UFC.com Awards
    - 2018: Ranked #10 Upset of the Year vs. Bryan Caraway

== Personal life ==
Stamann has two monikers. His moniker "Spartan" was coined after the name of his hometown, and "Mr. Wonderful" was given by his coach.

Stamann worked part-time in his family business prior to his first win in UFC.

Stamann enjoys fishing.

On May 27, 2020, it was reported that Stamann's 18-year-old brother Jacob had died.

== Mixed martial arts record ==
Professional record breakdown
31 matches	22 wins	8 losses
By knockout	7	0
By submission	2	3
By decision	13	5
Draws	1	

Res.	Record	Opponent	Method	Event	Date	Round	Time	Location	Notes
Win	22–8–1	Shawn Tarlton	Decision (unanimous)	Legends of Combat 5	October 25, 2025	3	5:00	Muskegon, Michigan, United States	Return to Featherweight.
Loss	21–8–1	Da'Mon Blackshear	Submission (rear-naked choke)	UFC Fight Night: Magny vs. Prates	November 9, 2024	1	4:19	Las Vegas, Nevada, United States	
Loss	21–7–1	Taylor Lapilus	Decision (unanimous)	UFC on ESPN: Cannonier vs. Imavov	June 8, 2024	3	5:00	Louisville, Kentucky, United States	
Loss	21–6–1	Douglas Silva de Andrade	Decision (unanimous)	UFC on ABC: Rozenstruik vs. Almeida	May 13, 2023	3	5:00	Charlotte, North Carolina, United States	Catchweight (140 lb) bout.
Win	21–5–1	Luan Lacerda	Decision (unanimous)	UFC 283	January 21, 2023	3	5:00	Rio de Janeiro, Brazil	
Win	20–5–1	Eddie Wineland	TKO (punches)	UFC on ESPN: Kattar vs. Emmett	June 18, 2022	1	0:59	Austin, Texas, United States	Performance of the Night.
Loss	19–5–1	Said Nurmagomedov	Submission (guillotine choke)	UFC 270	January 22, 2022	1	0:47	Anaheim, California, United States	
Loss	19–4–1	Merab Dvalishvili	Decision (unanimous)	UFC on ESPN: Reyes vs. Procházka	May 1, 2021	3	5:00	Las Vegas, Nevada, United States	Return to Bantamweight.
Loss	19–3–1	Jimmie Rivera	Decision (unanimous)	UFC on ESPN: Kattar vs. Ige	July 16, 2020	3	5:00	Abu Dhabi, United Arab Emirates	
Win	19–2–1	Brian Kelleher	Decision (unanimous)	UFC 250	June 6, 2020	3	5:00	Las Vegas, Nevada, United States	Return to Featherweight.
Draw	18–2–1	Song Yadong	Draw (majority)	UFC on ESPN: Overeem vs. Rozenstruik	December 7, 2019	3	5:00	Washington, D.C., United States	Song was deducted a point in round 1 due to an illegal knee
Win	18–2	Alejandro Pérez	Decision (unanimous)	UFC 235	March 2, 2019	3	5:00	Las Vegas, Nevada, United States	
Loss	17–2	Aljamain Sterling	Submission (Suloev stretch)	UFC 228	September 8, 2018	2	3:42	Dallas, Texas, United States	
Win	17–1	Bryan Caraway	Decision (split)	UFC 222	March 3, 2018	3	5:00	Las Vegas, Nevada, United States	
Win	16–1	Tom Duquesnoy	Decision (split)	UFC 216	October 7, 2017	3	5:00	Las Vegas, Nevada, United States	Return to Bantamweight.
Win	15–1	Terrion Ware	Decision (unanimous)	UFC 213	July 8, 2017	3	5:00	Las Vegas, Nevada, United States	
Win	14–1	Zac Church	TKO (punches)	Knockout Promotions 55	April 29, 2017	2	2:38	Grand Rapids, Michigan, United States	
Win	13–1	Bill Kamery	TKO (punches)	Knockout Promotions 54	March 17, 2017	1	4:59	Grand Rapids, Michigan, United States	Bantamweight bout.
Win	12–1	Stephen Cervantes	Decision (majority)	Knockout Promotions 51	November 5, 2016	3	5:00	Grand Rapids, Michigan, United States	
Win	11–1	Erik Vo	Submission (kimura)	Knockout Promotions 50	August 27, 2016	3	1:22	Grand Rapids, Michigan, United States	Return to Featherweight.
Win	10–1	Farkhad Sharipov	Decision (unanimous)	Knockout Promotions 48	March 26, 2016	3	5:00	Grand Rapids, Michigan, United States	
Win	9–1	Chris Dunn	Decision (unanimous)	Michiana Fight League 39	October 24, 2015	5	5:00	South Bend, Indiana, United States	Won the MFL Bantamweight Championship.
Win	8–1	Giovanni Moljo	Decision (unanimous)	Total Warrior Combat 26	November 22, 2014	3	5:00	Lansing, Michigan, United States	
Loss	7–1	Lawrence DiGiulio	Decision (split)	WXC 52	August 15, 2014	3	5:00	Southgate, Michigan, United States	
Win	7–0	Ruben Baraiac	TKO (punches)	Triple X Cagefighting: Legends 4	June 21, 2014	3	2:40	Mt. Clemens, Michigan, United States	Defended the TXC Featherweight Championship.
Win	6–0	Jeremy Czarnecki	Decision (unanimous)	Triple X Cagefighting: Legends 3	February 22, 2014	5	5:00	Mt. Clemens, Michigan, United States	Return to Featherweight. Won the vacant TXC Featherweight Championship.
Win	5–0	Adam Alvarez	TKO (punches)	Triple X Cagefighting: Legends 2	October 19, 2013	1	1:40	Mt. Clemens, Michigan, United States	Bantamweight debut.
Win	4–0	Terry House Jr.	Decision (unanimous)	Hoosier Fight Club 16	June 1, 2013	3	5:00	Valparaiso, Indiana, United States	Catchweight (140 lb) bout.
Win	3–0	Benjamin Alexandercu	KO (punch)	Local Kombat: New Beginnings	February 22, 2013	2	3:48	Craiova, Romania	
Win	2–0	Chris Bourdon	Submission (guillotine choke)	Impact Fight League 51	November 17, 2012	1	0:08	Auburn Hills, Michigan, United States	
Win	1–0	Chad Coon	TKO (punches)	Impact Fight League 39	November 19, 2011	1	3:49	Auburn Hills, Michigan, United States	

== Professional boxing record ==
1 fight	0 wins	1 loss
By decision	0	1

No.	Result	Record	Opponent	Method	Round, time	Date	Location	Notes
1	Loss	0–1	(United States) Afrim Mema	MD	4	December 28, 2012	(United States) Masonic Temple, Detroit, Michigan, U.S.	

== See also ==
- List of male mixed martial artists
