= Terrion Ware =

American mixed martial arts fighter

- Born: Terrion Jamar Ware; March 31, 1986 (age 40); Los Angeles, California, United States
- Nationality: American
- Height: 5 ft 8 in (1.73 m)
- Weight: 135 lb (61 kg; 9 st 9 lb)
- Division: Bantamweight
- Reach: 71 in (180 cm)
- Stance: Orthodox
- Fighting out of: Los Angeles, California
- Team: A4 Fitness
- Years active: 2011–present

Mixed martial arts record
- Total: 30
- Wins: 18
- By knockout: 6
- By submission: 4
- By decision: 8
- Losses: 12
- By submission: 4
- By decision: 8

Other information
- Mixed martial arts record from Sherdog

Terrion Jamar Ware (born March 31, 1986) is an American mixed martial artist who competed in the Bantamweight division of the Ultimate Fighting Championship.

== Background ==
Growing up in Los Angeles, Terrion's original dream was to play for the Los Angeles Dodgers. Ware was signed by the Los Angeles Angels out of college and played in their minor league system. He made it all the way to their Single A team, Rancho Cucamonga Quakes, as a centerfielder but he had to give up on baseball due to an arm injury he originally suffered in college.

== Mixed martial arts career ==
=== Early career ===
Starting his MMA career in 2012, Ware fought for various regional American promotions, compiling a 17–5 record while winning the BAMMA USA Bantamweight Championship against Eric Winston, and defending it once against Jeff Martin, as well as the California Xtreme Fighting Bantamweight Championship against Jared Papazian. Other memorable fights during this time were his fight against Leandro Higo at RFA 29 on August 21, 2015, which he lost via last second rear-naked choke at the end of round 3. He also fought for the Absolute Championship Berkut promotion at ACB 51: Silva vs. Torgeson. At this event he won against Nick Mamalis via unanimous decision.

=== Ultimate Fighting Championship ===
In his UFC debut, Ware faced Cody Stamann on July 8, 2017, at UFC 213 in Las Vegas. He lost the fight by unanimous decision.

Terrion faced promotional newcomer Sean O'Malley on December 1, 2017, at The Ultimate Fighter 26 Finale. He lost the fight via unanimous decision.

Ware faced Tom Duquesnoy on March 17, 2018, at UFC Fight Night 127. He lost the fight by unanimous decision.

Terrion Ware faced Merab Dvalishvili on September 15, 2018, at UFC Fight Night: Hunt vs. Oleinik. He lost the fight via unanimous decision.

Following his fourth straight loss, Ware was released from the UFC.

=== Post UFC ===
Following his release, Terrion's first fight outside of the UFC was against Jordan Winski at Cage Fury Fighting Championships 75 on May 25, 2019. He lost the fight via split decision.

Terrion's next fight was against Denis Purić at Fight Night 11: Lethbridge on September 28, 2019, for the ZF Bantamweight Championship. He lost the fight via split decision.

After almost a 3 year lay off, Ware faced Anthony Jimenez on May 21, 2022, at UNF 1. He won the bout via rear-naked choke in the third round.

Ware faced Albert Morales for the UNF Featherweight Championship on August 20, 2022, at UNF 2. He lost the bout via arm-triangle choke in the third round.

== Championships and accomplishments ==
=== Mixed martial arts ===
- BAMMA USA
  - BU Bantamweight Championship. (one time)
    - One successful title defense
- California Xtreme Fighting
  - CXF Bantamweight Championship (one time)

== Mixed martial arts record ==
Professional record breakdown
| 30 matches | 18 wins | 12 losses |
| By knockout | 6 | 0 |
| By submission | 4 | 4 |
| By decision | 8 | 8 |

| Res. | Record | Opponent | Method | Event | Date | Round | Time | Location | Notes |
|---|---|---|---|---|---|---|---|---|---|
| Loss | 18–12 | Albert Morales | Submission (arm-triangle choke) | UNF 2 | August 20, 2022 | 3 | 1:28 | Commerce, California, United States | For the UNF Featherweight Championship. |
| Win | 18–11 | Anthony Jimenez | Submission (rear-naked choke) | UNF 1 | May 21, 2022 | 3 | 1:41 | Burbank, California, United States | Return to Featherweight. |
| Loss | 17–11 | Denis Purić | Decision (split) | Fight Night 11: Lethbridge | September 28, 2019 | 3 | 5:00 | Lethbridge, Canada | |
| Loss | 17–10 | Jordan Winski | Decision (split) | Cage Fury Fighting Championships 75 | May 25, 2019 | 3 | 5:00 | Coachella, California, United States | |
| Loss | 17–9 | Merab Dvalishvili | Decision (unanimous) | UFC Fight Night: Hunt vs. Oleinik | September 15, 2018 | 3 | 5:00 | Moscow, Russia | |
| Loss | 17–8 | Tom Duquesnoy | Decision (unanimous) | UFC Fight Night: Werdum vs. Volkov | March 17, 2018 | 3 | 5:00 | London, England | |
| Loss | 17–7 | Sean O'Malley | Decision (unanimous) | The Ultimate Fighter: A New World Champion Finale | December 1, 2017 | 3 | 5:00 | Las Vegas, Nevada, United States | |
| Loss | 17–6 | Cody Stamann | Decision (unanimous) | UFC 213 | July 8, 2017 | 3 | 5:00 | Las Vegas, Nevada, United States | Featherweight bout. |
| Win | 17–5 | Jared Papazian | KO (punch) | CXF 7: Locked and Loaded | April 29, 2017 | 3 | 0:20 | Studio City, California, United States | Won the CXF Bantamweight Championship. |
| Win | 16–5 | Nick Mamalis | Decision (unanimous) | ACB 51: Silva vs. Torgeson | January 13, 2017 | 3 | 5:00 | Irvine, California, United States | |
| Win | 15–5 | Marvin Blumer | Decision (unanimous) | RFA 40 | July 15, 2016 | 3 | 5:00 | Prior Lake, Minnesota, United States | |
| Win | 14–5 | Rob Gooch | Decision (unanimous) | CXF 2: Gold Rush | April 22, 2016 | 3 | 5:00 | Studio City, California, United States | |
| Loss | 13–5 | Leandro Higo | Submission (rear-naked choke) | RFA 29 | August 21, 2015 | 3 | 4:58 | Sioux Falls, South Dakota, United States | |
| Loss | 13–4 | Luke Sanders | Decision (unanimous) | Legacy FC vs. RFA Superfight Card | May 8, 2015 | 5 | 5:00 | Robinsonville, Mississippi, United States | For the RFA Bantamweight Championship. |
| Win | 13–3 | Joe Murphy | Decision (unanimous) | RFA 23 | Feb 6, 2015 | 3 | 5:00 | Costa Mesa, California, United States | |
| Win | 12–3 | Jeff Martin | TKO (punches) | BAMMA USA: Badbeat 13 | October 10, 2014 | 4 | 1:47 | Commerce, California, United States | Defended the BU Bantamweight Championship. |
| Loss | 11–3 | Joe Soto | Submission (north-south choke) | Tachi Palace Fights 20 | August 7, 2014 | 3 | 2:48 | Lemoore, California, United States | |
| Win | 11–2 | Eric Winston | Decision (unanimous) | BAMMA USA: Badbeat 12 | March 28, 2014 | 3 | 5:00 | Commerce, California, United States | Won the vacant BU Bantamweight Championship. |
| Win | 10–2 | Zac Chavez | Submission (rear-naked choke) | RFA 12 | January 24, 2014 | 2 | 3:58 | Los Angeles, California, United States | Catchweight (140 lbs) |
| Win | 9–2 | Kevin Michel | Submission (triangle choke) | KOTC: Terrified | October 31, 2013 | 1 | 4:26 | Highland, California, United States | |
| Win | 8–2 | German Baltazar | Decision (split) | BAMMA USA: Pro Series 3 | September 7, 2013 | 3 | 5:00 | Tarzana, California, United States | |
| Win | 7–2 | Octavio Morales | Submission (choke) | MEZ Sports: Pandemonium 9 | July 26, 2013 | 2 | 3:12 | Mission Viejo, California, United States | |
| Win | 6–2 | Bobby Sanchez | KO (punch) | BAMMA USA: Bad Beat 9 | May 31, 2013 | 1 | 0:48 | Commerce, California, United States | Catchweight (130 lbs) |
| Loss | 5–2 | Jared Papazian | Decision (unanimous) | BAMMA USA: Bad Beat 8 | March 15, 2013 | 3 | 5:00 | Commerce, California, United States | Bantamweight debut. |
| Win | 5–1 | Paul Amaro | Decision (unanimous) | IFS 13 | February 10, 2013 | 3 | 5:00 | La Puente, California, United States | |
| Win | 4–1 | Marvin Madariaga | Decision (split) | BAMMA USA: Badbeat 7 | October 12, 2012 | 3 | 5:00 | Commerce, California, United States | |
| Win | 3–1 | John Sassone | KO | IFS 12 | September 16, 2012 | 1 | 1:47 | La Puente, California, United States | |
| Win | 2–1 | Justin Santistevan | KO (punch) | CITC 11 | July 28, 2012 | 1 | 2:38 | Lancaster, California, United States | |
| Loss | 1–1 | Paul Amaro | Submission (guillotine choke) | Samurai MMA Pro 3 | July 13, 2012 | 3 | 2:09 | Culver City, California, United States | |
| Win | 1–0 | John Sassone | TKO (punches) | IFS 11 | June 10, 2012 | 1 | 2:29 | Industry, California, United States | Lightweight debut. |

== See also ==
- List of male mixed martial artists
