= UFC 316 =

UFC mixed martial arts event in 2025

UFC 316: Dvalishvili vs. O'Malley 2
- The poster for UFC 316: Dvalishvili vs. O'Malley 2
- Promotion: Ultimate Fighting Championship
- Date: June 7, 2025
- Venue: Prudential Center
- City: Newark, New Jersey, United States
- Attendance: 17,343
- Total gate: $6,501,177

Event chronology
UFC on ESPN: Gamrot vs. Klein	UFC 316: Dvalishvili vs. O'Malley 2	UFC on ESPN: Usman vs. Buckley

UFC 316: Dvalishvili vs. O'Malley 2 was a mixed martial arts event produced by the Ultimate Fighting Championship that took place on June 7, 2025, at the Prudential Center, in Newark, New Jersey, United States.

== Background ==
The event marked the promotion's 11th visit to Newark and first since UFC 302 in June 2024.

A UFC Bantamweight Championship rematch between current champion Merab Dvalishvili and former champion Sean O'Malley headlined this event. The pairing previously met in September 2024 at UFC 306 in which Dvalishvili captured the title by unanimous decision.

A UFC Women's Bantamweight Championship bout between current two-time champion (also The Ultimate Fighter: Team Rousey vs. Team Tate bantamweight winner) Julianna Peña and the 2012 and 2016 Olympic gold medalist in judo (also two-time PFL women's lightweight tournament champion) Kayla Harrison co-headlined this event.

A bantamweight bout between former title challenger Marlon Vera and Mario Bautista was scheduled for this event. They were previously expected to meet at UFC Fight Night: Sandhagen vs. Figueiredo in May, but the pairing was moved to this event for unknown reasons. In turn, Vera pulled out in mid May for undisclosed reasons and was replaced by promotional newcomer and former Bellator Bantamweight World Champion Patchy Mix.

A flyweight bout between Bruno Gustavo da Silva and Joshua Van took place at this event. They were previously scheduled to compete at UFC 313 in March, but Silva had to withdraw due to an injury.

Serghei Spivac and Shamil Gaziev were expected to meet in a heavyweight bout at UFC Fight Night: Burns vs. Morales. However, the bout was moved to this event due to undisclosed reasons. In turn, Gaziev pulled out due to undisclosed reasons and was replaced by former LFA Heavyweight Champion Waldo Cortes-Acosta.

A light heavyweight bout between Johnny Walker and Azamat Murzakanov was scheduled for this event. They were originally scheduled for UFC Fight Night: Burns vs. Morales but were moved to this event for unknown reasons. However, Walker pulled out in early May due to injury and was replaced by Brendson Ribeiro.

Former interim UFC Middleweight Championship challenger (also The Ultimate Fighter: Team Jones vs. Team Sonnen middleweight winner) Kelvin Gastelum and Joe Pyfer fought in a middleweight bout at this event. They were previously scheduled to meet at UFC on ESPN: Moreno vs. Erceg in March, but the fight was cancelled on the day of the event as Pyfer had to withdraw due to an illness.

Uroš Medić was expected to meet Khaos Williams in a welterweight bout on the preliminary card. However, Medić pulled out in late May due to sinusitis and was replaced by promotional newcomer Albert Tadevosyan. In turn, Tadevosyan did not pass his medical tests, so Williams instead faced another newcomer in Andreas Gustafsson, who was originally scheduled to compete at UFC on ESPN: Gamrot vs. Klein one week before.

At the weigh-ins, former KSW Women's Flyweight Champion Ariane da Silva weighed in at 132 pounds, six pounds over the flyweight non-title fight limit. Her bout with Wang Cong proceeded at catchweight and she was fined 25 percent of her purse which went to Wang.

During the event's broadcast, two-time UFC Heavyweight Tournament winner (UFC 14 and UFC 15) Mark Kerr was announced as the next "pioneer wing" and final UFC Hall of Fame inductee of this year during International Fight Week festivities in Las Vegas this June.

== Results ==
Main card
Weight class				Method	Round	Time	Notes
Bantamweight	Merab Dvalishvili (c)	def.	Sean O'Malley	Submission (north-south choke)	3	4:42	(Note: For the UFC Bantamweight Championship.)
Women's Bantamweight	Kayla Harrison	def.	Julianna Peña (c)	Submission (kimura)	2	4:55	(Note: For the UFC Women's Bantamweight Championship. Peña was deducted one point in round 1 due to illegal upkicks.)
Middleweight	Joe Pyfer	def.	Kelvin Gastelum	Decision (unanimous) (29–28, 29–27, 30–27)	3	5:00
Bantamweight	Mario Bautista	def.	Patchy Mix	Decision (unanimous) (29–28, 30–27, 30–27)	3	5:00
Welterweight	Kevin Holland	def.	Vicente Luque	Submission (anaconda choke)	2	1:03
Preliminary card (ESPN / ESPN+ / Disney+)
Flyweight	Joshua Van	def.	Bruno Gustavo da Silva	TKO (punches)	3	4:01
Light Heavyweight	Azamat Murzakanov	def.	Brendson Ribeiro	TKO (submission to punches)	1	3:25
Heavyweight	Waldo Cortes-Acosta	def.	Serghei Spivac	Decision (unanimous) (30–27, 29–28, 29–28)	3	5:00
Welterweight	Andreas Gustafsson	def.	Khaos Williams	Decision (unanimous) (30–27, 30–26, 30–26)	3	5:00
Early preliminary card (ESPN+ / Disney+ / UFC Fight Pass)
Catchweight (132 lb)	Wang Cong	def.	Ariane da Silva	Decision (unanimous) (30–27, 30–27, 30–27)	3	5:00
Featherweight	Yoo Joo-sang	def.	Jeka Saragih	KO (punch)	1	0:28
Lightweight	Quillan Salkilld	def.	Yanal Ashmouz	Decision (unanimous) (30–27, 29–28, 29–28)	3	5:00
Lightweight	MarQuel Mederos	def.	Mark Choinski	Decision (unanimous) (30–27, 30–27, 29–28)	3	5:00

== Bonus awards ==
The following fighters received $50,000 bonuses.

- Fight of the Night: No bonus awarded.
- Performance of the Night: Merab Dvalishvili, Kayla Harrison, Kevin Holland, and Yoo Joo-sang

== See also ==
- 2025 in UFC
- List of current UFC fighters
- List of UFC events
