= 2007 in sports =

2007 in sports describes the year's events in world sport.

== Alpine skiing ==
- Alpine Skiing World Cup
  - Men's overall season champion: Aksel Lund Svindal (Norway)
  - Women's overall season champion: Nicole Hosp (Austria)

== American football ==
- Super Bowl XLI – the Indianapolis Colts (AFC) won 29–17 over the Chicago Bears (NFC)
  - Location: Dolphin Stadium
  - Attendance: 74,512
  - MVP: Peyton Manning, QB (Indianapolis)
- BCS National Championship Game at Fiesta Bowl (2006 season):
  - The Florida Gators won 41–14 over the Ohio State Buckeyes to win the National Championship
- December 16 - The Miami Dolphins defeat the Baltimore Ravens 22–16 in overtime to claim their only win of the 2007 NFL season. With the Dolphins losing their final two games, they would've suffered an Imperfect season if not for that overtime victory, a year before the Detroit Lions became the first winless team since the NFL expanded to a 16-game schedule.
- December 29 - The New England Patriots became the second team after the 1972 Miami Dolphins to win all their regular season games after defeating the New York Giants 38-35 (16-0). They would win 2 playoff games and enter Super Bowl XLII at 18–0. However, the Patriots could not complete what could have been a historic 19–0 season. The Giants upset the Patriots 17–14.

== Association football ==
- UEFA Champions League 2006-07 Final in Athens won by AC Milan over Liverpool 2–1
- UEFA Cup 2006-07 Final in Glasgow – Sevilla beat Espanyol 2–2 (3–1 pens)
- Copa América 2007 in Venezuela – Brazil beat Argentina 3–0 in the final
- Copa Libertadores 2007 won by Boca Juniors.

== Australian rules football ==
- Geelong wins its first Australian Football League Grand Final since 1963, thrashing Port Adelaide by 119 points in the biggest Grand Final margin in VFL/AFL history. The final score was 24.19 (163) to 6.8 (44).

== Athletics ==
- August–September – 2007 World Championships in Athletics held at Nagai Stadium in Osaka
- September 9 – sprinter Asafa Powell of Jamaica breaks the previous record set by himself at the 100 metres sprint (9.77 seconds) and sets a new world record of 9.74
- September 30 – Haile Gebrselassie of Ethiopia sets new world marathon record time of 2:04:26 at Berlin

== Baseball ==
- 2007 World Series – Boston Red Sox sweep the Colorado Rockies 4–0
- 2007 Japan Series – in a rematch of last year's series, the Chunichi Dragons win 4–1 over the 2006 champion Hokkaido Nippon-Ham Fighters.
- August 7 – Barry Bonds became Major League Baseball's career leader in home runs amid a cloud of controversy regarding his suspected use of performance-enhancing drugs by hitting the 756th home run of his career, surpassing Hank Aaron's previous mark of 755
- 2007 Asia Series – Japanese team Chunichi Dragons wins against Koreans SK Wyverns

Oregon State Beavers win back to back National Championships.

- 2007 Pacific Asian Baseball League Finals -

Seoul Shrubbery defeat the defend champions Singapore Sushi 1,300-1,212 to capture their first ever Periwinkle Feather.

== Basketball ==
- January 1: Bob Knight becomes the winningest coach in men's college basketball history when Texas Tech defeats New Mexico, 70–68.
- San Antonio Spurs won their fourth NBA Championship by sweeping the Cleveland Cavaliers in four games. Tony Parker was named Finals MVP.
- 2007 NCAA Division I men's basketball tournament – Florida became the first team to repeat as champions since Duke in 1991 and 1992
- 2007 NCAA Division I women's basketball tournament won for the seventh time by Tennessee with the Lady Vols' Candace Parker named Most Outstanding Player.
- Euroleague Final – Panathinaikos defeat defending champions CSKA Moscow 93–91 at the Olympic Indoor Hall in Athens
- The Phoenix Mercury would stun the 2006 WNBA Champion Detroit Shock in 5 games to capture their first title in franchise history. It was the second year in a row that a defending champion was stunned by another team who wasn't in the finals that previous year.

== Boxing ==
- January 20 Nicolay Valuev successfully defends his WBA Heavyweight title by defeating Jameel McCline, by technical knockout aun McCline blows out his knee.
- February 3 Chad Dawson becomes the WBC Light Heavyweight champion after defeating Tomasz Adamek by unanimous decision. Despite being knocked down from a straight right hand on round ten, Dawson dominates most of the fight with his speed.
- February 10 Shane Mosley becomes the WBC Welterweight champion by defeating Luis Collazo by unanimous decision.
- March 10 Wladimir Klitschko successfully defends his IBF Heavyweight title after defeating Ray Austin by 2nd-round knockout.
- April 14 Ruslan Chagaev becomes the new WBA Heavyweight Champion after defeating Nicolay Valuev by majority decision.
- April 28 Juan Díaz unifies the WBA and WBO Lightweight titles after defeating Acelino Freitas, after Freitas refused to answer the bell before round nine.
- June 2 Sultan Ibragimov defeats Shannon Briggs by unanimous decision to take the WBO Heavyweight title.
- September 29 Kelly Pavlik upsets Jermain Taylor by seventh-round TKO to win the WBC, WBO, and universally recognized Middleweight Champion of the World. Pavlik was knocked down in the second round, but rallied back against a tired Taylor.
- November 4 Joe Calzaghe defeats Mikkel Kessler by unanimous decision in a unification bout for the WBA, WBC and WBO super middleweight titles. Calzaghe becomes the first undisputed super middleweight champion and surpasses the 20 defences made by Bernard Hopkins and Larry Holmes at middleweight and heavyweight respectively.

== Canadian football ==
- November 25 – The Saskatchewan Roughriders win the 95th Grey Cup game, defeating the Winnipeg Blue Bombers 23–19 at Rogers Centre in Toronto.

== Cricket ==
- The Ashes – Australia completes a 5–0 whitewash over England in the 2006-07 Ashes series, the first time since 1920–21 that one team has won all the Tests in an Ashes series
- 2007 Cricket World Cup held in the West Indies – Australia beat Sri Lanka by 53 runs in the final
- The inaugural ICC World Twenty20 held in South Africa; India beat Pakistan in the finals by 5 runs

== Cycling ==
Grand Tours:

- Alberto Contador wins the 2007 Tour de France.
- Danilo Di Luca wins the 2007 Giro d'Italia.
- Denis Menchov wins the 2007 Vuelta a España.

== Darts ==
- 2007 PDC World Darts Championship Final – Raymond van Barneveld beats Phil Taylor 7–6

== Field hockey ==
- 2007 Men's Hockey Champions Trophy: Germany
- 2007 Men's Hockey Champions Challenge: Argentina
- 2007 Men's EuroHockey Nations Championship: Netherlands
- 2007 Women's Hockey Champions Trophy: Netherlands
- 2007 Women's Hockey Champions Challenge: China
- 2007 Women's EuroHockey Nations Championship: Germany

== Floorball ==
- Women's World Floorball Championships
  - Champion: Sweden
- Men's under-19 World Floorball Championships
  - Champion: Sweden
- European Cup
  - Men's champion: (Sweden) AIK IBF
  - Women's champion: (Switzerland) UHC Dietlikon

== Golf ==
Men's professional

- Masters Tournament – Zach Johnson
- U.S. Open at Oakmont – Ángel Cabrera
- British Open at Carnoustie – Pádraig Harrington beats Sergio García in a play-off.
- PGA Championship at Southern Hills – Tiger Woods wins his thirteenth major championship, and fourth PGA Championship.

Men's amateur

- British Amateur – Drew Weaver
- U.S. Amateur – Colt Knost
- European Amateur – Benjamin Hébert

Women's professional

- Kraft Nabisco Championship at Mission Hills Country Club (Rancho Mirage, California) – Morgan Pressel, at 18 years 313 days, becomes the youngest woman to ever win a major. She is also the first American to win this particular event since Dottie Pepper in 1999.
- LPGA Championship at Bulle Rock Golf Course (Havre de Grace, Maryland) – Norway's Suzann Pettersen wins her first major.
- US Women's Open at Pine Needles Lodge & Golf Club (Southern Pines, North Carolina) – American Cristie Kerr wins her first major.
- Women's British Open at St Andrews – World Number 1 Lorena Ochoa of Mexico wins her first major.

== Handball ==
- 2007 World Men's Handball Championship – won by Germany

== Horse racing ==
Steeplechases

- Cheltenham Gold Cup – Kauto Star
- Grand National – Silver Birch

Flat races

- Australia – Melbourne Cup won by Efficient
- Canadian Triple Crown:
  1. Queen's Plate – Mike Fox
  2. Prince of Wales Stakes – Alezzandro
  3. Breeders' Stakes – Marchfield
- Dubai – Dubai World Cup won by Invasor
- France – Prix de l'Arc de Triomphe won by Dylan Thomas
- Ireland – Irish Derby Stakes won by Soldier of Fortune
- Japan – Japan Cup won by Admire Moon
- English Triple Crown:
  1. 2,000 Guineas Stakes – Cockney Rebel
  2. The Derby – Authorized
  3. St. Leger Stakes – Lucarno
- United States Triple Crown Races:
  1. Kentucky Derby – Street Sense
  2. Preakness Stakes – Curlin
  3. Belmont Stakes – Rags to Riches
- Breeders' Cup World Thoroughbred Championships:
  - Day 1:
    1. Breeders' Cup Filly & Mare Sprint – Maryfield
    2. Breeders' Cup Juvenile Turf – Nownownow
    3. Breeders' Cup Dirt Mile – Corinthian
  - Day 2:
    1. Breeders' Cup Juvenile Fillies – Indian Blessing
    2. Breeders' Cup Juvenile – War Pass
    3. Breeders' Cup Filly & Mare Turf – Lahudood
    4. Breeders' Cup Sprint – Midnight Lute
    5. Breeders' Cup Mile – Kip Deville
    6. Breeders' Cup Distaff – Ginger Punch
    7. Breeders' Cup Turf – English Channel
    8. Breeders' Cup Classic – Curlin

== Ice hockey ==
- May 8 – The International Ice Hockey Federation announces that it will formalize the Triple Gold Club, previously a media-created term that grouped individuals who have won the Stanley Cup along with gold medals at the Olympics and World Championships. At the time of announcement, the club consisted of 18 members.
- Anaheim Ducks win the Stanley Cup, defeating the Ottawa Senators in 5 games.
  - The Ducks' Scott Niedermayer wins the Conn Smythe Trophy as MVP of the Stanley Cup playoffs.
  - Fellow Duck Chris Pronger becomes the newest member of the Triple Gold Club.
- Dany Heatley scores 50 goals with the Ottawa Senators which leads to the creation of the phrase “50 in ‘07.”

== Mixed martial arts ==
The following is a list of major noteworthy MMA events during 2007 in chronological order.

Date	Event	Alternate Name/s	Location	Attendance	PPV Buyrate	Notes
January 19	IFL: Oakland	—	(United States) Oakland, California, USA	—	—	Start of 2007 IFL Season.
January 20	WEC 25: McCullough vs. Cope	—	(United States) Oakland, California, USA	—	—	First WEC event under Zuffa ownership.
January 25	UFC Fight Night: Rashad Evans vs Sean Salmon	UFC Fight Night: Evans vs Salmon UFC Fight Night 8	(United States) Hollywood, Florida, USA	—	—	—
February 2	IFL: Houston	—	(United States) Houston, Texas, USA	—	—	—
February 3	UFC 67: All or Nothing	—	(United States) Las Vegas, Nevada, USA	10,227	350,000 (Min.) 400,000 (Max.)	—
February 10	Strikeforce: Young Guns	—	(United States) San Jose, California, USA	3,169	—	—
February 10	EliteXC Destiny	—	(United States) Southaven, Mississippi, USA	7,200	—	EliteXC's first event.
February 10	Cage Rage 20: Born 2 Fight	—	London, England	—	—	—
February 23	IFL: Atlanta	—	(United States) Duluth, Georgia, USA	—	—	—
February 24	Pride 33: The Second Coming	—	(United States) Las Vegas, Nevada, USA	12,911	—	—
March 3	UFC 68: The Uprising	—	(United States) Columbus, Ohio, USA	19,049	534,000	—
March 12	K-1 Hero's 8	—	Nagoya, Japan	—	—	—
March 12	IFL: Los Angeles	—	(United States) Inglewood, California, USA	—	—	—
March 24	WEC 26: Condit vs. Alessio	—	(United States) Las Vegas, Nevada, USA	1,819	—	—
April 5	UFC Fight Night: Stevenson vs Guillard	UFC Fight Night 9	(United States) Las Vegas, Nevada, USA	1,734	—	—
April 7	IFL: Moline	—	(United States) Moline, Illinois, USA	—	—	—
April 7	UFC 69: Shootout	—	(United States) Houston, Texas, USA	15,269	400,000	—
April 8	Pride 34: Kamikaze	—	Saitama, Japan	—	—	Last Pride FC event.
April 13	IFL: Connecticut	—	(United States) Uncasville, Connecticut, USA	—	—	—
April 21	UFC 70: Nations Collide	—	Manchester, England	15,114	—	—
April 21	Cage Rage 21: Judgement Day	—	London, England	—	—	—
May 12	WEC 27: Marshall vs. McElfresh	—	(United States) Las Vegas, Nevada, USA	—	—	—
May 19	IFL: Chicago	—	(United States) Hoffman Estates, Illinois, USA	—	—	—
May 26	UFC 71: Liddell vs. Jackson	—	(United States) Las Vegas, Nevada, USA	14,728	675,000	—
June 1	IFL: Everett	—	(United States) Everett, Washington, USA	—	—	—
June 2	SoftBank presents Dynamite!! USA	Dynamite!! USA	(United States) Los Angeles, California, USA	18,340	35,000	—
June 3	WEC 28: Faber vs. Farrar	—	(United States) Las Vegas, Nevada, USA	—	—	—
June 12	UFC Fight Night: Stout vs Fisher	UFC Fight Night 10	(United States) Hollywood, Florida, USA	—	—	—
June 16	IFL: Las Vegas	—	(United States) Hollywood, Florida, USA	—	—	—
June 16	UFC 72: Victory	—	Belfast, Northern Ireland, UK	7,850	200,000	—
June 22	Strikeforce: Shamrock vs. Baroni	—	(United States) San Jose, California, USA	9,672	35,000	—
June 23	The Ultimate Fighter 5 Finale	—	(United States) Las Vegas, Nevada, USA	—	—	—
June 23	CFFC V: Two Worlds, One Cage	—	(United States) Atlantic City, New Jersey, USA	7,286	—	—
June 7	UFC 73: Stacked	—	(United States) Sacramento, California, USA	13,183	425,000	—
June 16	K-1 Hero's 9	—	Yokohama, Japan	—	—	—
June 27	ShoXC 1	—	(United States) Santa Ynez, California, USA	—	—	—
August 2	IFL: 2007 Semifinals	—	(United States) East Rutherford, New Jersey, USA	—	—	—
August 5	WEC 29: Condit vs. Larson	—	(United States) Las Vegas, Nevada, USA	—	—	—
August 25	ShoXC 2	—	(United States) Vicksburg, Mississippi, USA	—	—	—
August 25	UFC 74: Respect	—	(United States) Las Vegas, Nevada, USA	11,118	520,000	—
September 1	Art of War 3: USA vs Brazil	—	(United States) Dallas, Texas, USA	—	—	—
September 5	WEC 30: McCullough vs. Crunkilton	—	(United States) Las Vegas, Nevada, USA	—	—	—
September 8	UFC 75: Champion vs. Champion	—	London, England	16,235	—	—
September 15	EliteXC: Uprising	—	(United States) Oahu, Hawaii, USA	—	—	—
September 17	K-1 Hero's 10	—	Yokohama, Japan	—	—	—
September 19	UFC Fight Night: Din Thomas vs Kenny Florian	UFC Fight Night: Thomas vs Florian UFC Fight Night 11	(United States) Las Vegas, Nevada, USA	—	—	—
September 20	IFL: 2007 Championship	—	(United States) Hollywood, Florida, USA	—	—	End of 2007 IFL Season.
September 22	UFC 76: Knockout	—	(United States) Anaheim, California, USA	13,770	475,000	—
September 22	Cage Rage 23: Unbelievable	—	London, England	—	—	—
September 29	Strikeforce: Playboy Mansion	—	(United States) Los Angeles, California, USA	3,569	—	—
October 20	UFC 77: Hostile Territory	—	(United States) Cincinnati, Ohio, USA	16,054	325,000	—
October 26	ShoXC 3	—	(United States) Santa Ynez, California, USA	—	—	—
October 28	K-1 Hero's Korea 2007	—	Seoul, South Korea	—	—	Last K-1 Hero's event.
November 10	EliteXC: Renegade	—	(United States) Corpus Christi, Texas, USA	—	—	—
November 16	Strikeforce: Four Men Enter, One Man Survives	—	(United States) San Jose, California, USA	7,249	—	—
November 17	UFC 78: Validation	—	(United States) Newark, New Jersey, USA	14,071	400,000	—
December 1	Cage Rage 24: Feel the Pain	—	London, England	—	—	—
December 8	The Ultimate Fighter: Team Hughes vs Team Serra Finale	The Ultimate Fighter 6 Finale	(United States) Las Vegas, Nevada, USA	—	—	—
December 12	WEC 31: Faber vs. Curran	—	(United States) Las Vegas, Nevada, USA	—	—	—
December 29	UFC 79: Nemesis	—	(United States) Las Vegas, Nevada, USA	11,075	750,000+	—
December 31	K-1 PREMIUM 2007 Dynamite!!	—	Osaka, Japan	47,928	—	Event featured seven MMA bouts and eight K-1 kickboxing bouts.
December 31	Yarennoka!	—	Saitama, Japan	27,128	—	Under a collaboration promotion of Pride FC, M-1 Global, and FEG.

== Orienteering ==
- August – 2007 World Orienteering Championships held in Kyiv

== Rink hockey ==
- Spain wins the 2007 Rink Hockey World Championship, defeating Switzerland in the final.

== Rugby league ==
- February 23 at Reebok Stadium, Bolton, England – 2007 World Club Challenge is won by St. Helens who defeated the Brisbane Broncos 18–14 before 23,207
- April 20 at Brisbane – 2007 ANZAC Day Test is won by Australia 30–6 against New Zealand at Suncorp Stadium before 35,241
- June 13 at Telstra Stadium, Sydney – The 2007 State of Origin series is wrapped up by Queensland in game two of the series before 76,924
- August 25 at Wembley Stadium – 2007 Challenge Cup tournament culminates in St. Helens' 30–8 win against Catalans Dragons in the final before 84,241
- September 30 at Sydney – The 2007 NRL season culminates in the minor premiers Melbourne Storm's 34–8 win against the Manly Warringah Sea Eagles in the 2007 NRL Grand Final
- October 13 at Manchester – Super League XII culminates in the Leeds Rhinos' 33–5 win against minor premiers St. Helens in the Grand Final
- November 17 at Paris – 2007 All Golds Tour, a repeat of the first ever international rugby league tour 100 years before, ends with a New Zealand win against France.

== Rugby union ==
- 113th Six Nations Championship series is won by France
- 2007 Rugby World Cup held in stadiums throughout France, with matches also held in Edinburgh and Cardiff. South Africa beat defending champions England in the final 15–6 to win the World Cup.
- 2007 Super 14 Final at ABSA Stadium, Durban – The Bulls score a converted try after the final horn to defeat the homestanding Sharks 20–19, becoming the first South African team to win the Super Rugby competition in its professional era.
- 2007 Heineken Cup Final at Twickenham, London – London Wasps deny Leicester Tigers a treble with a 25–9 win.

Domestic competitions

- English Premiership – Leicester Tigers
- Top 14 – Stade Français
- Celtic League – Ospreys
- EDF Energy Cup – Leicester Tigers
- Air New Zealand Cup – Auckland
- Currie Cup – Free State Cheetahs
- Australian Rugby Championship – Central Coast Rays

== Ski jumping ==
- Anders Jacobsen (Norway) wins the Four Hills Tournament

== Snooker ==
- 2007 World Snooker Championship – John Higgins wins his second world title after beating Mark Selby in the final 18–13.

== Swimming ==
- 2007 World Aquatics Championships held in Melbourne
- July – Swimming at the 2007 Pan American Games
- December – European Short Course Swimming Championships 2007 held in Debrecen, Hungary

== Taekwondo ==
- World Championships held in Beijing

== Tennis ==
- Australian Open Women's Singles – Serena Williams defeats Maria Sharapova 6–1, 6–2 in the final
- U.S. Open Men's Singles – Roger Federer defeats Novak Djokovic
- U.S. Open Women's Singles – Justine Henin defeats Svetlana Kuznetsova

== Volleyball ==
- Men's World League: Brazil
- 2007 Men's European Volleyball League: Spain
- Women's World Grand Prix: Netherlands

== Water polo ==
- Men's water polo World Championship 2007 : Croatia
- Women's water polo World Championship 2007 : United States
- 2007 FINA Men's Water Polo World League: Serbia
- 2007 FINA Women's Water Polo World League: USA

== Weightlifting ==
- European Championships held in Strasbourg
- World Championships held in Chiang Mai, Thailand

== Multi-sport events ==
- 2007 Winter Universiade, also known as the World Student Games, held in Turin, Italy
- 2007 All-Africa Games held in Algiers, Algeria
- XV Pan American Games held in Rio de Janeiro, Brazil
- 2007 Summer Universiade held in Bangkok, Thailand
- 2007 Southeast Asian Games held in Nakhon Ratchasima, Thailand
