= 2007 in Strikeforce =

Mixed martial arts events

Information
- First date: February 10, 2007
- Last date: November 16, 2007

Events
- Total events: 4

Fights
- Total fights: 52
- Title fights: 3

Chronology
2006 in Strikeforce	2007 in Strikeforce	2008 in Strikeforce

The year 2007 was the 2nd year in the history of Strikeforce, a mixed martial arts promotion based in the United States. In 2007 Strikeforce held 4 events beginning with, Strikeforce: Young Guns.

== Title fights ==
Title fights in 2007
Weight class				Method	Round	Time	Event	Notes
Middleweight	Frank Shamrock	def.	Phil Baroni	submission (rear-naked choke)	2	4:15	Strikeforce: Shamrock vs. Baroni	(Note: For the Strikeforce Middleweight Championship.)
Lightweight	Josh Thomson (c)	def.	Nick Gonzalez	submission (rear-naked choke)	1	1:42	Strikeforce: Shamrock vs. Baroni	(Note: For the Strikeforce Lightweight U.S. Championship.)
Heavyweight	Alistair Overeem	def.	Paul Buentello	submission (knees to the body)	2	3:42	Strikeforce: Four Men Enter, One Man Survives	(Note: For the Strikeforce Heavyweight Championship.)

== Events list ==
#	Event Title	Date	Arena	Location	Attendance	Broadcast
8	Strikeforce: Four Men Enter, One Man Survives	November 16, 2007	HP Pavilion at San Jose	San Jose, California	7,249	
7	Strikeforce: Playboy Mansion	September 29, 2007	The Playboy Mansion	Beverly Hills, California	3,569	
6	Strikeforce: Shamrock vs. Baroni	June 22, 2007	HP Pavilion at San Jose	San Jose, California	9,672	PPV
5	Strikeforce: Young Guns	February 10, 2007	San Jose Civic Auditorium	San Jose, California	3,169	

== Strikeforce: Young Guns ==
Strikeforce: Young Guns was an event held on February 10, 2007 at the San Jose Civic Auditorium in San Jose, California.

=== Results ===
Fight card
Weight class				Method	Round	Time	Notes
Lightweight	Jose Palacios	def.	Miguel Linares	Decision (unanimous)	3	3:00
Bantamweight	Chris Cariaso	def.	Andrew Valladerez	Decision (unanimous)	3	3:00
Women's Lightweight	Michelle Maher	def.	Elaina Maxwell	Decision (unanimous)	3	3:00
Middleweight	Nik Theotikos	def.	Devin Johnson	TKO (punches)	1	0:11
Lightweight	Billy Evangelista	def.	Isaiah Hill	TKO (punches)	1	1:39
Heavyweight	Yohan Banks	def.	Joey Beltran	Decision (unanimous)	3	3:00
Lightweight	Andrew Montanez	def.	David Smith	Decision (unanimous)	3	3:00
Lightweight	Alvin Cacdac	def.	Bobby Sanchez	Submission (heel hook)	2	1:45
Welterweight	Juan Alcain	def.	Mario Rivera	Decision (unanimous)	3	3:00

== Strikeforce: Shamrock vs. Baroni ==
Strikeforce: Shamrock vs. Baroni was an event held on June 22, 2007 at the HP Pavilion at San Jose in San Jose, California.

=== Results ===
Main Card
Weight class				Method	Round	Time	Notes
Middleweight	Frank Shamrock	def	Phil Baroni	submission (rear-naked choke)	2	4:15	(Note: For the Strikeforce Middleweight Championship.)
Middleweight	Murilo Rua	def	Joey Villasenor	KO (punches)	2	1:05
Middleweight	Cung Le	def	Tony Fryklund	TKO (punches)	3	0:25
Heavyweight	Paul Buentello	def	Carter Williams	KO (punches)	2	0:10
Lightweight	Josh Thomson (c)	def	Nick Gonzalez	submission (rear-naked choke)	1	1:42	(Note: For the Strikeforce Lightweight U.S. Championship.)
Welterweight	Paul Daley	def	Duane Ludwig	TKO (punches)	2	0:32
Preliminary card
Lightweight	David Smith	def	Sean Bassett	KO (punch)	2	1:23
Lightweight	James Edson Berto	def	Victor Valenzuela	submission (heel hook)	1	0:47
Middleweight	Nik Theotiko	def	Nikk Covert	KO (punch)	1	1:13
Welterweight	Mike Pyle	def	Aaron Wetherspoon	unanimous decision	3	5:00
Welterweight	Luke Stewart	def	Jason Von Flue	TKO (punches)	3	2:17
Heavyweight	Rex Richards	def	Ray Seraile	TKO (punches)	1	0:35
Bantamweight	Chris Cariaso	def	Anthony Figueroa	unanimous decision	3	5:00
Catchweight (179 lb)	Jeffrey Cachia	def	Shigeru Momoi	submission (guillotine choke)	1	1:58
Middleweight	Seth Kleinbeck	def	Sam Spengler	TKO (punches)	2	2:55

== Strikeforce: Playboy Mansion ==
Strikeforce: Playboy Mansion was an event held on September 29, 2007 at The Playboy Mansion in Beverly Hills, California.

=== Results ===
Main Card
Weight class				Method	Round	Time	Notes
Light Heavyweight	Bobby Southworth	def.	Bill Mahood	verbal submission (injured ribs)	1	1:15
Lightweight	Gilbert Melendez	def.	Tetsuji Kato	unanimous decision (30-27, 30-27, 30-27)	3	5:00
Middleweight	Joe Riggs	def.	Eugene Jackson	KO (punches)	1	3:56
Lightweight	Josh Thomson	def.	Adam Lynn	KO (punches)	1	4:45
Lightweight	Billy Evangelista	def.	Clint Coronel	split decision (28-29, 29-28, 29-28)	3	5:00
Catchweight (160 lb)	Jorge Masvidal	def.	Matt Lee	TKO (punches)	1	1:33
Preliminary Card
Catchweight (195 lb)	Falaniko Vitale	def.	Ron Fields	submission (strikes)	1	3:02
Heavyweight	Daniel Puder	def.	Richard Dalton	unanimous decision (30-27, 30-27, 29-28)	3	5:00
Light Heavyweight	Dewey Cooper	def.	Adam Smith	unanimous decision	3	5:00
Middleweight	Daniel McWilliams	def.	Eddy Millis	Submission (rear naked choke)	1	2:09
Welterweight	Luke Stewart	def.	Sam Liera	TKO (strikes)	1	3:40
Bantamweight	Anthony Figueroa	def.	Miguel Linares	TKO (strikes)	1	2:09

== Strikeforce: Four Men Enter, One Man Survives ==
Strikeforce: Four Men Enter, One Man Survives was an event held on November 16, 2007 at the HP Pavilion at San Jose in San Jose, California.

=== Results ===
Main Card
Weight class				Method	Round	Time	Notes
Heavyweight	Alistair Overeem	def.	Paul Buentello	submission (knees to the body)	2	3:42	(Note: For the Strikeforce Heavyweight Championship.)
Middleweight	Cung Le	def.	Sammy Morgan	TKO (body kick)	3	1:58
Middleweight Tournament Final
Middleweight	Jorge Santiago	def.	Trevor Prangley	TKO (knee to the body)	1	2:31
Middleweight Tournament Semi-finals
Middleweight	Trevor Prangley	def.	Falaniko Vitale	decision (referee decision)	2	2:12
Middleweight	Jorge Santiago	def.	Sean Salmon	KO (flying knee)	1	0:24
Preliminary card
Light Heavyweight	Anthony Ruiz	def.	Bobby Southworth	TKO (doctor stoppage)	2	0:52
Welterweight	Luke Stewart	def.	Bryson Kamaka	KO (knee)	1	0:19
Middleweight	Eric Lawson	def.	Josh Neal	submission (rear-naked choke)	2	0:20
Bantamweight	Anthony Figueroa	def.	Peter Sabala	split decision	3	5:00
Lightweight	Alex Crispin	def.	Clint Coronel	unanimous decision	3	5:00
Featherweight	Chris Drumm	vs.	Evan Esguerra	NC (punch to back of the head)	2	2:35
Middleweight	Dennis Hallman	def.	Jeremiah Metcalf	submission (heel hook)	1	1:39

== See also ==
- List of Strikeforce champions
- List of Strikeforce events
