= Cariaso =

Cariaso is a surname. Notable people with the surname include:

- Chris Cariaso (born 1981), Filipino-American mixed martial artist
- Jeffrey Cariaso (born 1972), Filipino-American basketball player and coach
