= Raphael Assunção =

Brazilian mixed martial artist (born 1982)

- Born: 19 July 1982 (age 44); Recife, Pernambuco, Brazil
- Height: 5 ft 5 in (1.65 m)
- Weight: 135 lb (61 kg; 9.6 st)
- Division: Lightweight (2004–2006); Featherweight (2006–2011); Bantamweight (2012–2023)
- Reach: 66 1/2 in (169 cm)
- Style: Muay Thai, Brazilian Jiu-Jitsu, Shotokan
- Stance: Southpaw
- Fighting out of: Alpharetta, Georgia, U.S.
- Team: Ascension Mixed Martial Arts
- Rank: Black belt in Brazilian Jiu-Jitsu
- Years active: 2004–2023

Mixed martial arts record
- Total: 38
- Wins: 28
- By knockout: 4
- By submission: 10
- By decision: 14
- Losses: 10
- By knockout: 3
- By submission: 3
- By decision: 4

Other information
- Notable relatives: Junior Assunção (brother)
- Mixed martial arts record from Sherdog

Raphael Assunção (born 19 July 1982) is a Brazilian former professional mixed martial artist who competed in the Bantamweight division of the Ultimate Fighting Championship (UFC).

== Background ==
Born in Recife in Northeast Brazil, Assunção moved to United States with his immigrant parents when he was a child. He now lives and trains in Atlanta with Ascension MMA under Manu N'toh. He is also the brother of Júnior Assunção and Freddy Assunção who also fight as mixed martial artists. Assunção has a daughter.

== Mixed martial arts career ==
=== World Extreme Cagefighting ===
Assunção joined the WEC in 2009, with a 12–1 professional record. He made his promotional debut on 5 April 2009 at WEC 40 against Jameel Massouh. He won the fight via unanimous decision.

He faced Yves Jabouin on 2 September 2009 at WEC 43. Assunção won the back and forth fight by split decision.

Assunção faced Urijah Faber on 10 January 2010 at WEC 46. Faber won the fight via third-round submission.

Assunção then faced Diego Nunes on 20 June 2010 at WEC 49. He lost the fight via split decision.

Assunção faced LC Davis on 11 November 2010 at WEC 52. Assunção won the fight via unanimous decision.

=== Ultimate Fighting Championship ===
On 28 October 2010, World Extreme Cagefighting merged with the Ultimate Fighting Championship. As part of the merger, all WEC fighters were transferred to the UFC.

Assunção was expected to face Manvel Gamburyan on 19 March 2011 at UFC 128, but Gamburyan was forced out of the bout with a back injury and replaced by Erik Koch. He lost the fight via knockout in the first round.

Assunção next faced UFC newcomer Johnny Eduardo on 27 August 2011 at UFC 134. He won the fight via unanimous decision and was out up to 6 months with a possible nasal fracture.

Assunção faced Issei Tamura on 11 July 2012 at UFC on Fuel TV: Munoz vs. Weidman. He won the fight via second-round TKO.

Assunção faced Mike Easton on 8 December 2012, at UFC on Fox 5, replacing an injured Bryan Caraway. He won the fight via unanimous decision despite suffering a broken arm during the first round.

Assunção faced Vaughan Lee on 8 June 2013 at UFC on Fuel TV 10. He won the fight via armbar submission in the second round.

Assunção was expected to face T.J. Dillashaw on 4 September 2013 at UFC Fight Night 28. However, the pairing was delayed and was rescheduled for a future event due to a minor medical issue for Assunção. The bout with Dillashaw was rescheduled and took place on 9 October 2013, at UFC Fight Night 29. Assunção defeated Dillashaw via split decision. 10 out of 13 media outlets scored the bout for Dillashaw. The back and forth action earned both the participants Fight of the Night honors.

Assunção was expected to face Francisco Rivera at UFC 170. However, Rivera was forced from the bout due to a hand injury. Assunção instead faced touted UFC newcomer Pedro Munhoz. He won the fight via unanimous decision.

Assunção was briefly linked to a Bantamweight Championship bout against Renan Barão on 24 May 2014 at UFC 173. However, Assunção opted to decline the bout as a rib injury sustained in his last bout at UFC 170 had not healed enough to resume the proper training in advance of the event. Barão instead faced, and was ultimately defeated by T.J. Dillashaw.

Assunção faced Bryan Caraway on 4 October 2014 at UFC Fight Night: MacDonald vs. Saffiedine. He doubled the numbers of strikes Caraway threw and caught him with knees to win a unanimous decision victory.

On 22 December 2014, Assunção announced that he had suffered a broken ankle during training that would not require surgery, but is expected to be sidelined for up to 10 weeks.

A rematch with perennial contender Urijah Faber was expected to headline UFC Fight Night 62 on 21 March 2015. However, Assunção was forced out of the bout as an ankle first injured in mid-December 2014 was slow to heal and that he was unable to resume the proper training to prepare for the fight in that time frame. Subsequently, in August 2015, Assunção's management team announced that he would undergo surgery on the ankle and hoped to return by the end of the year.

A rematch with T.J. Dillashaw took place on 9 July 2016 at UFC 200. He lost the fight via unanimous decision.

Assunção was expected to face Aljamain Sterling on 9 December 2016 at UFC Fight Night 102. However, Sterling pulled out of the fight on 23 November citing injury. Assunção was subsequently removed from the card. The bout with Sterling was rescheduled and took place on 28 January 2017 at UFC on Fox 23. Assunção won the fight via split decision.

Assunção faced Marlon Moraes on 3 June 2017 at UFC 212. He won the back-and-forth fight by split decision.

Assunção faced Matthew Lopez on 11 November 2017 at UFC Fight Night: Poirier vs. Pettis. At the weigh-ins, Lopez missed weight, weighing in at 138.5 lbs., three and a half pounds over the Bantamweight limit. As a result, he forfeited 20% of his purse to Assunção and the bout proceeded as Catchweight. He won the fight via knock out in the third round. This win also earned him a Performance of the Night bonus award.

Assunção faced Rob Font on 7 July 2018 at UFC 226. He won via unanimous decision.

Assunção faced Marlon Moraes in a rematch on 2 February 2019 in the main event at UFC Fight Night 144. Assunção won the first fight by split decision at UFC 212 on 3 June 2017. Before accepting the rematch, Assunção negotiated a new contract with the UFC. Assunção lost the rematch in the first round after being dropped by two punches and then submitted via a guillotine choke.

Assunção faced Cory Sandhagen on 17 August 2019 at UFC 241. He lost the bout by unanimous decision.

Assunção was scheduled to face Cody Garbrandt as the co-main event on 28 March 2020 at UFC on ESPN 8. However, Garbrandt pulled out on 12 March due to kidney issues. As of now, Assunção is expected to remain on the card against an unknown opponent. Due to the COVID-19 pandemic, the event was eventually postponed. Instead the fight was rescheduled and took place on 6 June 2020 at UFC 250. Assunção lost the bout via second-round knockout.

Assunção was scheduled to face Raoni Barcelos on 27 February 2021 at UFC Fight Night 186. However, Assunção pulled out of the fight in early February after testing positive for COVID-19.

Assunção was scheduled to face Kyler Phillips on 24 July 2021 at UFC on ESPN: Sandhagen vs. Dillashaw. However, Assunção suffered a biceps injury in late June and was replaced by Raulian Paiva.

Assunção faced Ricky Simón on 18 December 2021 at UFC Fight Night: Lewis vs. Daukaus. He lost the bout via knockout in the second round.

Assunção faced Victor Henry on 15 October 2022, at UFC Fight Night 212. He won the fight via unanimous decision.

Assunção was scheduled to face Kyler Phillips on 11 March 2023, at UFC Fight Night 221. However, Phillips withdrew from the event for undisclosed reasons, and he was replaced by Davey Grant. He lost the fight via an inverted triangle choke technical submission in the third round, and announced his retirement during the post-fight interview.

== Championships and achievements ==
=== Mixed martial arts ===
- Ultimate Fighting Championship
  - Fight of the Night (One time) vs. T.J. Dillashaw
  - Performance of the Night (One time) vs. Matthew Lopez
  - Fifth most total fight time in UFC Bantamweight division history (3:44:19)
  - Tied (Aljamain Sterling) for fourth most bouts in UFC Bantamweight division history (18)
  - Tied (Sean O'Malley & Mario Bautista) for sixth most wins in UFC Bantamweight division history (12)
  - Tied (Petr Yan) for second most decision wins in UFC Bantamweight division history (9) (behind Merab Dvalishvili)
  - Tied (Petr Yan & Renan Barão) for the fourth longest win streak in UFC Bantamweight history (7)
  - Tied (Takeya Mizugaki & Yves Jabouin) for most split decision wins in UFC Bantamweight division history (3)
  - UFC.com Awards
    - 2017: Ranked #9 Fighter of the Year

== Mixed martial arts record ==
Professional record breakdown
38 matches	28 wins	10 losses
By knockout	4	3
By submission	10	3
By decision	14	4

Res.	Record	Opponent	Method	Event	Date	Round	Time	Location	Notes
Loss	28–10	Davey Grant	Technical Submission (inverted triangle choke)	UFC Fight Night: Yan vs. Dvalishvili	11 March 2023	3	4:43	Las Vegas, Nevada, United States	Grant was deducted 1 point in round 3 for grabbing the fence.
Win	28–9	Victor Henry	Decision (unanimous)	UFC Fight Night: Grasso vs. Araújo	15 October 2022	3	5:00	Las Vegas, Nevada, United States	
Loss	27–9	Ricky Simón	KO (punches)	UFC Fight Night: Lewis vs. Daukaus	18 December 2021	2	2:14	Las Vegas, Nevada, United States	
Loss	27–8	Cody Garbrandt	KO (punch)	UFC 250	6 June 2020	2	4:59	Las Vegas, Nevada, United States	
Loss	27–7	Cory Sandhagen	Decision (unanimous)	UFC 241	17 August 2019	3	5:00	Anaheim, California, United States	
Loss	27–6	Marlon Moraes	Submission (guillotine choke)	UFC Fight Night: Assunção vs. Moraes 2	2 February 2019	1	3:17	Fortaleza, Brazil	
Win	27–5	Rob Font	Decision (unanimous)	UFC 226	7 July 2018	3	5:00	Las Vegas, Nevada, United States	
Win	26–5	Matthew Lopez	KO (punch)	UFC Fight Night: Poirier vs. Pettis	11 November 2017	3	1:50	Norfolk, Virginia, United States	Catchweight (138.5 lb) bout; Lopez missed weight. Performance of the Night.
Win	25–5	Marlon Moraes	Decision (split)	UFC 212	3 June 2017	3	5:00	Rio de Janeiro, Brazil	
Win	24–5	Aljamain Sterling	Decision (split)	UFC on Fox: Shevchenko vs. Peña	28 January 2017	3	5:00	Denver, Colorado, United States	
Loss	23–5	T.J. Dillashaw	Decision (unanimous)	UFC 200	9 July 2016	3	5:00	Las Vegas, Nevada, United States	
Win	23–4	Bryan Caraway	Decision (unanimous)	UFC Fight Night: MacDonald vs. Saffiedine	4 October 2014	3	5:00	Halifax, Nova Scotia, Canada	
Win	22–4	Pedro Munhoz	Decision (unanimous)	UFC 170	22 February 2014	3	5:00	Las Vegas, Nevada, United States	
Win	21–4	T.J. Dillashaw	Decision (split)	UFC Fight Night: Maia vs. Shields	9 October 2013	3	5:00	Barueri, Brazil	Fight of the Night.
Win	20–4	Vaughan Lee	Submission (armbar)	UFC on Fuel TV: Nogueira vs. Werdum	8 June 2013	2	1:51	Fortaleza, Brazil	
Win	19–4	Mike Easton	Decision (unanimous)	UFC on Fox: Henderson vs. Diaz	8 December 2012	3	5:00	Seattle, Washington, United States	
Win	18–4	Issei Tamura	TKO (punches)	UFC on Fuel TV: Muñoz vs. Weidman	11 July 2012	2	0:25	San Jose, California, United States	
Win	17–4	Johnny Eduardo	Decision (unanimous)	UFC 134	27 August 2011	3	5:00	Rio de Janeiro, Brazil	Bantamweight debut.
Loss	16–4	Erik Koch	KO (punch)	UFC 128	19 March 2011	1	2:32	Newark, New Jersey, United States	
Win	16–3	LC Davis	Decision (unanimous)	WEC 52	11 November 2010	3	5:00	Las Vegas, Nevada, United States	
Loss	15–3	Diego Nunes	Decision (split)	WEC 49	20 June 2010	3	5:00	Edmonton, Alberta, Canada	
Loss	15–2	Urijah Faber	Submission (rear-naked choke)	WEC 46	10 January 2010	3	3:49	Sacramento, California, United States	
Win	15–1	Yves Jabouin	Decision (split)	WEC 43	10 October 2009	3	5:00	San Antonio, Texas, United States	
Win	14–1	Jameel Massouh	Decision (unanimous)	WEC 40	5 April 2009	3	5:00	Chicago, Illinois, United States	
Win	13–1	Joe Pearson	TKO (punches)	Ironheart Crown 12	8 November 2008	1	0:12	Chicago, Illinois, United States	
Win	12–1	Aaron Williams	Submission (armbar)	American Fight League: Eruption	7 March 2008	1	3:22	Lexington, Kentucky, United States	
Win	11–1	Kevin Gittemeir	Decision (unanimous)	International Sport Combat Federation: Head-On Collision	1 June 2007	3	5:00	Kennesaw, Georgia, United States	
Win	10–1	Tyler Grunwald	Submission (triangle choke)	International Sport Combat Federation: Battle of Rome 2	21 April 2007	1	0:56	Rome, Georgia, United States	
Loss	9–1	Jeff Curran	Decision (majority)	XFO 13	11 November 2006	3	5:00	Hoffman Estates, Illinois, United States	
Win	9–0	James Birdsley	Submission (rear-naked choke)	Cage FC: Border Warz	14 October 2006	3	1:42	Colorado Springs, Colorado, United States	
Win	8–0	Nick Mamalis	Submission (armbar)	Ring of Fire 26	9 September 2006	1	3:35	Castle Rock, Colorado, United States	Featherweight debut.
Win	7–0	Joe Lauzon	Submission (armbar)	Absolute FC 15	18 February 2006	2	4:37	Fort Lauderdale, Florida, United States	
Win	6–0	William McGlothlin	Submission (guillotine choke)	Full Throttle 4	9 September 2005	2	3:58	Duluth, Georgia, United States	
Win	5–0	Jorge Masvidal	Decision (unanimous)	Full Throttle 1	21 April 2005	3	5:00	Duluth, Georgia, United States	
Win	4–0	Brandon Bledsoe	Submission (armbar)	International Sport Combat Federation: Compound Fracture 2	4 February 2005	1	2:31	Atlanta, Georgia, United States	
Win	3–0	Chad Lawshe	Submission (guillotine choke)	International Sport Combat Federation: Compound Fracture	15 October 2004	1	0:54	Atlanta, Georgia, United States	
Win	2–0	Scott Johnson	Submission (armbar)	International Sport Combat Federation: Anarchy in August 2	7 August 2004	1	2:41	Atlanta, Georgia, United States	
Win	1–0	Chris Clark	TKO (punches)	International Sport Combat Federation: Friday Night Fight	23 January 2004	1	N/A	Atlanta, Georgia, United States	Lightweight debut.

== See also ==
- List of male mixed martial artists
