= UFC Fight Night: Poirier vs. Pettis =

UFC mixed martial arts event in 2017

- The poster for UFC Fight Night: Poirier vs. Pettis
- Promotion: Ultimate Fighting Championship
- Date: November 11, 2017
- Venue: Ted Constant Convocation Center
- City: Norfolk, Virginia
- Attendance: 8,442
- Total gate: $642,070

Event chronology
UFC 217: Bisping vs. St-Pierre	UFC Fight Night: Poirier vs. Pettis	UFC Fight Night: Werdum vs. Tybura

UFC Fight Night: Poirier vs. Pettis (also known as UFC Fight Night 120) was a mixed martial arts event produced by the Ultimate Fighting Championship held on November 11, 2017, at Ted Constant Convocation Center in Norfolk, Virginia.

== Background ==
The event marked the first time that the promotion visited the Hampton Roads area of Virginia.

A lightweight bout between Dustin Poirier and former WEC and UFC Lightweight Champion Anthony Pettis served as the event headliner.

A light heavyweight bout between Jared Cannonier and Antônio Rogério Nogueira was briefly linked to serve as the co-headliner at this event. The fight was rescheduled to take place a month later at UFC on Fox: Lawler vs. dos Anjos.

At the weigh ins, Matthew Lopez weighed in at 138.5 pounds, 2.5 pounds over the bantamweight upper limit of 136 pounds. The bout proceeded at a catchweight and Lopez forfeited 20% of his purse to Raphael Assunção.

== Results ==
Main Card (Fox Sports 1)
Weight class				Method	Round	Time	Notes
Lightweight	Dustin Poirier	def.	Anthony Pettis	Submission (body triangle)	3	2:08
Welterweight	Matt Brown	def.	Diego Sanchez	KO (elbow)	1	3:44
Heavyweight	Andrei Arlovski	def.	Júnior Albini	Decision (unanimous) (29–28, 30–27, 30–27)	3	5:00
Middleweight	Cezar Ferreira	def.	Nate Marquardt	Decision (split) (28–29, 29–28, 29–28)	3	5:00
Catchweight (138.5 lb)	Raphael Assunção	def.	Matthew Lopez	KO (punch)	3	1:50
Lightweight	Clay Guida	def.	Joe Lauzon	TKO (punches and elbows)	1	1:07
Preliminary Card (Fox Sports 1)
Bantamweight	Marlon Moraes	def.	John Dodson	Decision (split) (30–27, 27–30, 30–27)	3	5:00
Women's Strawweight	Tatiana Suarez	def.	Viviane Pereira	Decision (unanimous) (30–27, 30–27, 30–26)	3	5:00
Lightweight	Sage Northcutt	def.	Michel Quiñones	Decision (unanimous) (30–27, 30–27, 30–27)	3	5:00
Women's Strawweight	Nina Ansaroff	def.	Angela Hill	Decision (unanimous) (29–28, 29–28, 29–28)	3	5:00
Preliminary Card (UFC Fight Pass)
Welterweight	Sean Strickland	def.	Court McGee	Decision (unanimous) (30–27, 29–28, 29–28)	3	5:00	(Note: Originally announced as a majority draw (30–27, 29–29, 29–29); later overturned to a unanimous decision win for Strickland due to a miscalculation in scores.)
Light Heavyweight	Jake Collier	def.	Marcel Fortuna	Decision (unanimous) (30–27, 29–28, 29–28)	3	5:00
Middleweight	Karl Roberson	def.	Darren Stewart	Submission (rear-naked choke)	1	3:41

== Bonus awards ==
The following fighters were awarded $50,000 bonuses:

- Fight of the Night: Dustin Poirier vs. Anthony Pettis
- Performance of the Night: Matt Brown and Raphael Assunção

== Reported payout ==
The following is the reported payout to the fighters as reported to the Virginia Department of Professional & Occupational Regulation. It does not include sponsor money or "locker room" bonuses often given by the UFC and also do not include the UFC's traditional "fight night" bonuses. The total disclosed payout for the event was $1,935,600.

- Dustin Poirier: $130,000 ($65,000 win bonus) def. Anthony Pettis: $135,000
- Matt Brown: $150,000 ($75,000 win bonus) def. Diego Sanchez: $95,000
- Andrei Arlovski: $250,000 (no win bonus) def. Júnior Albini: $12,000
- Cezar Ferreira: $78,000 ($39,000 win bonus) def. Nate Marquardt: $68,000
- Raphael Assunção: $113,600 ($55,000 win bonus) def. Matthew Lopez: $26,400 ^
- Clay Guida: $114,000 ($57,000 win bonus) def. Joe Lauzon: $62,000
- Marlon Moraes: $140,000 ($70,000 win bonus) def. John Dodson: $41,000
- Tatiana Suarez: $50,000 ($25,000 win bonus) def. Viviane Pereira: $14,000
- Sage Northcutt: $120,000 ($60,000 win bonus) def. Michel Quiñones: $10,000
- Nina Ansaroff: $36,000 ($18,000 win bonus) def. Angela Hill: $21,000
- Sean Strickland: $64,000 ($32,000 win bonus) def. Court McGee: $35,000
- Jake Collier: $36,000 ($18,000 win bonus) def. Marcel Fortuna: $14,000
- Karl Roberson: $20,000 ($10,000 win bonus) def. Darren Stewart: $10,000

^ Although not included on the initial report, Matthew Lopez was fined 20 percent of his purse ($3,600) for failing to make the required weight for his fight with Raphael Assunção. That money was issued to Assunção, a VDPOR official confirmed.

== See also ==
- List of UFC events
- 2017 in UFC
