= Matthew Lopez (fighter) =

American MMA fighter (born 1987)

- Born: January 21, 1987 (age 39); Safford, Arizona, United States
- Height: 5 ft 7 in (1.70 m)
- Weight: 61 kg (134 lb; 9 st 8 lb)
- Division: Bantamweight
- Reach: 69 in (175 cm)
- Style: Wrestling, Boxing, BJJ
- Fighting out of: Denver, Colorado, United States
- Team: Genesis Training Centre
- Years active: 2013–present

Mixed martial arts record
- Total: 14
- Wins: 10
- By knockout: 4
- By submission: 4
- By decision: 2
- Losses: 4
- By knockout: 2
- By submission: 1
- By decision: 1

Other information
- University: Cal State Fullerton; Arizona State University
- Mixed martial arts record from Sherdog

Matthew Lopez (born December 12, 1987) is an American mixed martial artist who competed in the bantamweight division of the Ultimate Fighting Championship (UFC).

== Background ==
Lopez was born in Safford, Arizona, United States. Lopez's father was the kid wrestling coach at Safford and he started training wrestling when he was young. He was a four time state champion wrestler at Sunnyside High School. He competed in wrestling in college at Arizona State University and Cal State Fullerton. After his collegiate wrestling career was over, he moved to MMA after seeing some of the wrestlers did well in MMA competitions.

== Mixed martial arts career ==
=== Early career ===
Lopez competed most of his fights in King of the Cage (KOTC) and Resurrection Fighting Alliance (RFA) MMA promotions prior joining UFC.

=== Ultimate Fighting Championship ===
On Dana White's Looking for a Fight (Season 1 Ep.6) web series show at Sioux Falls, White was impressed with Lopez's performance and signed Lopez into UFC.

Lopez made his promotional debut against Rani Yahya on July 13, 2016, at UFC Fight Night: McDonald vs. Lineker. He lost the fight via submission (arm-triangle choke) in the third round.

On his second appearance in UFC, Lopez faced Mitch Gagnon on December 10, 2016, at UFC 206. He won the fight by unanimous decision.

On June 3, 2017, Lopez faced Johnny Eduardo at UFC 212. He won the fight via TKO in the first round. In the post fight interview, Lopez thought referee Mario Yamasaki was biased and believed Yamasaki should have stopped the fight much earlier.

Lopez faced Raphael Assunção on November 11, 2017, at UFC Fight Night: Poirier vs. Pettis. At the weigh-ins, Lopez missed weight, weighing in at 138.5 lbs., two and a half pounds over the bantamweight limit. As a result, he forfeited 20% of his purse to Assunção and the bout proceeded at a catchweight. He lost the fight via knockout in the third round.

Lopez faced Alejandro Pérez on April 14, 2018, at UFC on Fox 29. He lost the fight via TKO in the second round.

Lopez faced Brad Katona on December 8, 2018, at UFC 231. He lost the fight by unanimous decision.

On March 19, 2020, it was reported that Lopez was no longer part of the UFC's roster.

== Personal life ==
The journey from wrestling to fighting in UFC was a tough one. Lopez was broke during his college years and forced to stay in a house without water and electricity for some time as he could not afford to pay the rent.

== Mixed martial arts record ==
Professional record breakdown
14 matches	10 wins	4 losses
By knockout	4	2
By submission	4	1
By decision	2	1

Res.	Record	Opponent	Method	Event	Date	Round	Time	Location	Notes
Loss	10–4	Brad Katona	Decision (unanimous)	UFC 231	December 8, 2018	3	5:00	Toronto, Ontario, Canada	
Loss	10–3	Alejandro Pérez	TKO (knees and punches)	UFC on Fox: Poirier vs. Gaethje	April 14, 2018	2	3:42	Glendale, Arizona, United States	
Loss	10–2	Raphael Assunção	KO (punch)	UFC Fight Night: Poirier vs. Pettis	November 11, 2017	3	1:50	Norfolk, Virginia, United States	Catchweight (138.5 lbs) bout; Lopez missed weight.
Win	10–1	Johnny Eduardo	TKO (punches)	UFC 212	June 3, 2017	1	2:57	Rio de Janeiro, Brazil	
Win	9–1	Mitch Gagnon	Decision (unanimous)	UFC 206	December 10, 2016	3	5:00	Toronto, Ontario, Canada	
Loss	8–1	Rani Yahya	Submission (arm-triangle choke)	UFC Fight Night: McDonald vs. Lineker	July 13, 2016	3	4:19	Sioux Falls, South Dakota, United States	
Win	8–0	Eli Finn	Submission (elbows and punches)	RFA 37	April 15, 2016	1	3:15	Sioux Falls, South Dakota, United States	
Win	7–0	Justin Linn	Submission (face lock)	RFA 31	October 9, 2015	1	2:16	Las Vegas, Nevada, United States	
Win	6–0	Kevin Clark	Submission (rear-naked choke)	RFA 29	August 21, 2015	1	0:36	Sioux Falls, South Dakota, United States	
Win	5–0	Devin Turner	Submission (rear-naked choke)	RFA 25	April 10, 2015	1	2:46	Sioux Falls, South Dakota, United States	Catchweight (140 lbs) bout.
Win	4–0	John Robles	TKO (punches)	RFA 21	December 5, 2014	1	1:35	Costa Mesa, California, United States	
Win	3–0	Miguelito Marti	TKO (punches)	Gladiator Challenge: Iron Fist	June 28, 2014	1	1:13	San Jacinto, California, United States	
Win	2–0	Sammy Silva	Decision (unanimous)	KOTC: Heated Fury	July 20, 2013	3	5:00	Scottsdale, Arizona, United States	
Win	1–0	Imani Jackson	TKO (punches)	KOTC: World Championships	May 25, 2013	1	4:05	Scottsdale, Arizona, United States	

== See also ==
- List of current UFC fighters
- List of male mixed martial artists
