= UFC 212 =

UFC mixed martial arts event in 2017

UFC 212: Aldo vs. Holloway
- The poster for UFC 212: Aldo vs. Holloway
- Promotion: Ultimate Fighting Championship
- Date: June 3, 2017
- Venue: Jeunesse Arena
- City: Rio de Janeiro, Brazil
- Attendance: 15,412

Event chronology
UFC Fight Night: Gustafsson vs. Teixeira	UFC 212: Aldo vs. Holloway	UFC Fight Night: Lewis vs. Hunt

UFC 212: Aldo vs. Holloway was a mixed martial arts event produced by the Ultimate Fighting Championship held on June 3, 2017, at the Jeunesse Arena in Rio de Janeiro, Brazil.

== Background ==
A UFC Featherweight Championship unification bout between two-time champion José Aldo and interim champion Max Holloway served as the main event.

The Ultimate Fighter: Team Jones vs. Team Sonnen middleweight winner Kelvin Gastelum was expected to face former UFC Middleweight Champion Anderson Silva at the event. However, on April 6, 2017, he was pulled from the bout after he was flagged for a potential doping violation by USADA stemming from his most recent bout against Vitor Belfort. Gastelum tested positive for Carboxy-Tetrahydrocannabinol (Carboxy-THC) which is a metabolite of marijuana or hashish above the 180 ng/mL allowance by the World Anti-Doping Agency (WADA) standard. The in-competition sample was collected on the night of Gastelum's fight on March 11 in Brazil. He has been placed on a provisional suspension as a result of the positive drug test and he will be afforded a full adjudication process.

As of April 10, 2017, it was confirmed that former Strikeforce and UFC Middleweight Champion Luke Rockhold was offered the fight and accepted it. In turn, Silva dismissed the idea a day later, citing that Rockhold was coming from a loss and because of that it wouldn't make sense. Instead, Silva floated potential matchups with Uriah Hall or a rematch with semi-retired Nick Diaz. On May 1, Silva gave the UFC an ultimatum: he wants to fight 2000 Olympic silver medalist and former world champion in freestyle wrestling Yoel Romero for the interim title or he will retire. In turn, despite having two months to secure an opponent, Silva and promotion officials confirmed on May 11 that he would not compete at the event.

Felipe Arantes was expected to face Iuri Alcântara at the event. However, on May 11, Arantes was pulled from the fight due to undisclosed reasons and was replaced by promotional newcomer Brian Kelleher.

A lightweight bout between The Ultimate Fighter: Brazil 2 welterweight winner Leonardo Santos and Olivier Aubin-Mercier was scheduled for this event, but was scrapped on May 18 after Aubin-Mercier got injured and Santos decided to pull out of the event.

== Results ==
Main Card
Weight class				Method	Round	Time	Notes
Featherweight	Max Holloway (ic)	def.	José Aldo (c)	TKO (punches)	3	4:13	(Note: UFC Featherweight Championship unification bout.)
Women's Strawweight	Cláudia Gadelha	def.	Karolina Kowalkiewicz	Submission (rear-naked choke)	1	3:03
Middleweight	Vitor Belfort	def.	Nate Marquardt	Decision (unanimous) (29–28, 29–28, 29–28)	3	5:00
Middleweight	Paulo Costa	def.	Oluwale Bamgbose	TKO (punches)	2	1:06
Welterweight	Yancy Medeiros	def.	Erick Silva	TKO (punches)	2	2:01
Preliminary Card (Fox Sports 1)
Bantamweight	Raphael Assunção	def.	Marlon Moraes	Decision (split) (28–29, 29–28, 30–27)	3	5:00
Middleweight	Antônio Carlos Júnior	def.	Eric Spicely	Submission (rear-naked choke)	2	3:49
Bantamweight	Matthew Lopez	def.	Johnny Eduardo	TKO (punches)	1	2:57
Bantamweight	Brian Kelleher	def.	Iuri Alcântara	Submission (guillotine choke)	1	1:48
Preliminary Card (UFC Fight Pass)
Women's Strawweight	Viviane Pereira	def.	Jamie Moyle	Decision (unanimous) (29–28, 30–27, 30–27)	3	5:00
Welterweight	Luan Chagas	def.	Jim Wallhead	Submission (rear-naked choke)	2	4:48
Flyweight	Deiveson Figueiredo	def.	Marco Beltrán	TKO (corner stoppage)	2	5:00

== Bonus awards ==
The following fighters were awarded $50,000 bonuses:

- Fight of the Night: Max Holloway vs. José Aldo
- Performance of the Night: Cláudia Gadelha and Brian Kelleher

== See also ==
- 2017 in UFC
- List of UFC events
