= Johnny Eduardo =

Brazilian mixed martial artist

- Born: August 3, 1978 (age 48); Rio de Janeiro, Brazil
- Height: 5 ft 8 in (1.73 m)
- Weight: 135 lb (61 kg; 9.6 st)
- Division: Bantamweight
- Reach: 71 in (180 cm)
- Fighting out of: Fairfield, New Jersey, United States
- Team: Nova União; Black House (MMA)
- Rank: Black belt in Brazilian Jiu-Jitsu under André Pedreneiras
- Years active: 1996–present

Mixed martial arts record
- Total: 41
- Wins: 28
- By knockout: 10
- By submission: 11
- By decision: 7
- Losses: 13
- By knockout: 1
- By submission: 10
- By decision: 2

Other information
- Mixed martial arts record from Sherdog

Johnny Eduardo (born August 3, 1978) is a Brazilian mixed martial artist currently fighting in the bantamweight division. He has formerly competed for the Ultimate Fighting Championship.

== Mixed martial arts career ==
=== Early career ===
Eduardo made his professional MMA debut at the age of sixteen. He fought exclusively in his native Brazil for the first two years of his career, achieving a record of 11 wins and 3 losses.

In December 1999, Eduardo made his international debut as he faced Takanori Gomi at Vale Tudo Japan 1999. He lost the fight via rear-naked choke submission.

Eduardo made his United States debut in April 2009 as he fought on one of the early cards for Bellator Fighting Championships.

=== Ultimate Fighting Championship ===
Eduardo made his UFC debut against Raphael Assunção on August 27, 2011, at UFC 134. He lost the bout via unanimous decision.

Eduardo was expected to face Michael McDonald on November 19, 2011, at UFC 139. However, Eduardo was forced from the card with an injury and replaced by Alex Soto.

Eduardo fought Jeff Curran at UFC on Fuel TV: Korean Zombie vs. Poirier. Eduardo defeated Curran via unanimous decision, earning him his first win in the UFC.

Eduardo was expected to face Yves Jabouin on March 16, 2013, at UFC 158. However, on March 6, Eduardo was forced to pull out of the bout citing a shoulder injury. Jabouin was then pulled from the card as a suitable replacement could not be found on short notice.

Eduardo was expected to face Lucas Martins on November 9, 2013, at UFC Fight Night 32. However, both fighters were removed from the card due to injury.

After almost two years out of the cage, Eduardo returned to the UFC to face Eddie Wineland on May 10, 2014, at UFC Fight Night 40. Despite being a significant betting underdog, he won the fight via KO in the first round. The win also earned Eduardo his first Performance of the Night bonus award.

In May 2015 after a year out of competition due to injury, Eduardo announced he had surgery to repair a torn labrum in his left shoulder, and hoped to have a fight booked in the fall of 2015.

Eduardo faced Aljamain Sterling on December 10, 2015, at UFC Fight Night 80. He lost the fight via submission in the second round.

Eduardo next faced Manvel Gamburyan on November 19, 2016, at UFC Fight Night 100. He won the fight via TKO in the second round.

Eduardo faced Matthew Lopez on June 3, 2017, at UFC 212. He lost the fight via TKO in the first round.

Eduardo faced Nathaniel Wood on June 1, 2018, at UFC Fight Night 131. He lost the fight via D’Arce choke submission in the second round.

Eduardo was scheduled to face Anthony Birchak on March 20, 2021, at UFC on ESPN 21. However, on March 15 Eduardo withdrew from the bout due to visa issues.

Eduardo faced Alejandro Pérez on October 2, 2021, at UFC Fight Night 193. He lost the fight via a scarf hold armlock in round two.

After the loss, Eduardo announced he was no longer under contract with the UFC.

== Personal life ==
He said his hero is Master Luis Alves saying "he was a man that helped shape who I am today."

== Championships and accomplishments ==
- International Vale Tudo Championship
  - IVC 7 Lightweight Tournament Runner Up
- Shooto Brazil
  - Shooto Brazil Lightweight Championship (1 Time)
- Ultimate Fighting Championship
  - Performance of the Night (One time)
  - UFC.com Awards
    - 2014: Ranked #7 Upset of the Year vs. Eddie Wineland

== Mixed martial arts record ==
Professional record breakdown
41 matches	28 wins	13 losses
By knockout	10	1
By submission	11	10
By decision	7	2

Res.	Record	Opponent	Method	Event	Date	Round	Time	Location	Notes
Loss	28–13	Alejandro Pérez	Submission (scarf hold armlock)	UFC Fight Night: Santos vs. Walker	October 2, 2021	2	4:13	Las Vegas, Nevada, United States	
Loss	28–12	Nathaniel Wood	Submission (D'Arce choke)	UFC Fight Night: Rivera vs. Moraes	June 1, 2018	2	2:18	Utica, New York, United States	
Loss	28–11	Matthew Lopez	TKO (punches)	UFC 212	June 3, 2017	1	2:57	Rio de Janeiro, Brazil	
Win	28–10	Manvel Gamburyan	TKO (punches)	UFC Fight Night: Bader vs. Nogueira 2	November 19, 2016	2	0:46	São Paulo, Brazil	
Loss	27–10	Aljamain Sterling	Submission (guillotine choke)	UFC Fight Night: Namajunas vs. VanZant	December 10, 2015	2	4:18	Las Vegas, Nevada, United States	
Win	27–9	Eddie Wineland	KO (punches)	UFC Fight Night: Brown vs. Silva	May 10, 2014	1	4:37	Cincinnati, Ohio, United States	Performance of the Night.
Win	26–9	Jeff Curran	Decision (unanimous)	UFC on Fuel TV: Korean Zombie vs. Poirier	May 15, 2012	3	5:00	Fairfax, Virginia, United States	
Loss	25–9	Raphael Assunção	Decision (unanimous)	UFC 134	August 27, 2011	3	5:00	Rio de Janeiro, Brazil	
Win	25–8	Jose Wilson	Submission (rear-naked choke)	Shooto: Brazil 22	April 1, 2011	3	2:57	Brasília, Brazil	
Win	24–8	Paulo Dantas	Decision (unanimous)	Shooto: Brazil 17	August 6, 2010	3	5:00	Rio de Janeiro, Brazil	Won the Shooto Brazil Lightweight Championship. Later vacated title.
Win	23–8	Francisco Chagas	TKO (leg injury)	Jungle Fight 16	October 17, 2009	1	N/A	Rio de Janeiro, Brazil	
Win	22–8	Donald Sanchez	Decision (unanimous)	Bellator 3	April 17, 2009	3	5:00	Norman, Oklahoma, United States	Catchweight (147 lb) bout.
Win	21–8	Bruno Alves	Submission (rear-naked choke)	The Warriors	March 29, 2009	3		Rio de Janeiro, Brazil	
Win	20–8	Andre Luis Oliveira	TKO (punches)	Shooto: Brazil 10	January 17, 2009	1	2:11	Rio de Janeiro, Brazil	
Win	19–8	Munil Adriano	TKO (punches)	Real Fight 6	November 8, 2008	1	2:20	São José dos Campos, Brazil	
Win	18–8	Francisco Ramos	Submission (anaconda choke)	Win Fight and Entertainment 1	September 28, 2008	1	3:56	Salvador, Brazil	
Win	17–8	Cristiano Bananada	Submission (armbar)	The Glory	July 5, 2008	2	1:29	Niterói, Brazil	
Win	16–8	Erinaldo Rodrigues	KO (punches)	Jungle Fight 9: Warriors	May 31, 2008	N/A	N/A	Rio de Janeiro, Brazil	
Win	15–8	Marcos Maciel	TKO (punches)	Rio FC 1	February 28, 2008	2	2:27	Rio de Janeiro, Brazil	
Loss	14–8	Miguel Angel Duran	Submission (punches)	Shooto Brazil 3: The Evolution	July 7, 2007	1	N/A	Rio de Janeiro, Brazil	
Loss	14–7	Milton Vieira	Submission (anaconda choke)	Super Challenge 1	October 7, 2006	2	N/A	Barueri, Brazil	
Win	14–6	Aritano Silva	Submission (arm-triangle choke)	Gold Fighters Championship 1	May 20, 2006	1	N/A	Rio de Janeiro, Brazil	
Win	13–6	Jose Adriano	Submission (heel hook)	Guarafight 2	January 7, 2006	1	1:08	Guarapari, Brazil	
Loss	12–6	Vusal Bayramov	Submission (armbar)	Conquista Fight 1	December 20, 2003	1	3:19	Vitória da Conquista, Brazil	
Win	12–5	Marcelo Cobra	Decision (unanimous)	K - NOCK	July 23, 2003	3	5:00	Rio de Janeiro, Brazil	
Loss	11–5	Takuya Kuwabara	Decision (unanimous)	Shooto - R.E.A.D. 2	March 17, 2000	3	5:00	Tokyo, Japan	Bantamweight debut.
Loss	11–4	Takanori Gomi	Submission (rear-naked choke)	Vale Tudo Japan 1999	December 11, 1999	3	1:43	Urayasu, Japan	
Loss	11–3	Haroldo Bunn	Submission (kneebar)	IVC 13Ç: The New Generation of Lightweights	August 26, 1998	1	7:40	São Paulo, Brazil	
Loss	11–2	Sergio Melo	Submission (rear-naked choke)	IVC 7: The New Champions	August 23, 1998	1	16:25	São Paulo, Brazil	IVC 7 Lightweight Tournament Final.
Win	11–1	Fabio Alves	Submission (punches)	IVC 7: The New Champions	August 23, 1998	1	3:30	São Paulo, Brazil	IVC 7 Lightweight Tournament Semifinal.
Win	10–1	Vanderci Garcia	Submission (punches)	IVC 7: The New Champions	August 23, 1998	1	2:07	São Paulo, Brazil	IVC 7 Lightweight Tournament Quarterfinal.
Win	9–1	Thiago Santana	Decision (unanimous)	Campos de Jordão Freestyle	June 6, 1998	2	8:00	Campos do Jordão, Brazil	
Win	8–1	Rudi Desouza	Submission (rear-naked choke)	Campos de Jordão Freestyle	June 6, 1998	1	N/A	Campos do Jordão, Brazil	
Win	7–1	Wanderley Esmala	Submission (triangle choke)	Desafio: Freestyle de Campos	May 18, 1998	1	15:49	Rio de Janeiro, Brazil	
Win	6–1	Arivaldo Souza	TKO (punches)	Guaratinguetá Freestyle 1	August 30, 1997	2	N/A	Guaratinguetá, Brazil	
Win	5–1	Guilherme Santos	Submission (rear-naked choke)	Guaratinguetá Freestyle 1	August 30, 1997	1	N/A	Guaratinguetá, Brazil	
Win	4–1	Marcos Rodrigues	Decision (unanimous)	Guaratinguetá Freestyle 1	August 30, 1997	2	8:00	Guaratinguetá, Brazil	
Win	3–1	Douglas Nascimento	Submission (ankle lock)	Itajubá Freestyle Open	April 5, 1997	3	N/A	Itajubá, Brazil	
Win	2–1	Claudionor Silva	Decision (unanimous)	Itajubá Freestyle Open	April 5, 1997	2	8:00	Itajubá, Brazil	
Win	1–1	Paulo Arum	Submission (heel hook)	Itajubá Freestyle Open	April 5, 1997	1	N/A	Itajubá, Brazil	
Loss	0–1	Wander Braga	Submission (rear-naked choke)	BVF 6: Campeonato Brasileiro de Vale Tudo 1	November 1, 1996	1	4:33	Belo Horizonte, Brazil	

== See also ==
- List of male mixed martial artists
