= John Lober =

American mixed martial arts fighter

- Born: February 26, 1968 (age 58); Huntington Beach, California, U.S.
- Other names: Machine
- Height: 5 ft 11 in (1.80 m)
- Weight: 199 lb (90 kg; 14.2 st)
- Division: Light Heavyweight
- Team: Team Machine
- Years active: 1996–2009

Mixed martial arts record
- Total: 18
- Wins: 5
- By knockout: 1
- By submission: 3
- By decision: 1
- Losses: 9
- By knockout: 3
- By submission: 3
- By decision: 3
- Draws: 4

Other information
- Mixed martial arts record from Sherdog

John Lober (born February 26, 1968) is an American mixed martial artist who competed in the Light Heavyweight division. Lober holds a notable victory over Frank Shamrock and also has cornered and trained with UFC Hall of Famer and former UFC Light Heavyweight Champion Tito Ortiz.

== Career accomplishments ==
=== Mixed martial arts ===
- Ultimate Fighting Championship
  - UFC Encyclopedia Awards
    - Fight of the Night (One time) vs. Frank Shamrock

== Mixed martial arts record ==
Professional record breakdown
| 18 matches | 5 wins | 9 losses |
| By knockout | 1 | 2 |
| By submission | 3 | 4 |
| By decision | 1 | 3 |
| Draws | 4 | |

| Res. | Record | Opponent | Method | Event | Date | Round | Time | Location | Notes |
|---|---|---|---|---|---|---|---|---|---|
| Loss | 5–9–4 | Lee McKibbin | Submission (guillotine choke) | Cage Wars: Nightmare | November 29, 2009 | 1 | 0:43 | Belfast, Northern Ireland | |
| Loss | 5–8–4 | Rubin Tagle | KO | KOTC: Final Chapter | December 2, 2007 | 1 | 0:10 | California, United States | |
| Win | 5–7–4 | Damien Gomez | TKO | KOTC: Point of No Return | October 7, 2007 | 1 | 3:20 | California, United States | |
| Loss | 4–7–4 | Marcelo Tigre | Submission (armbar) | Extreme Wars 2 – X-1 | March 18, 2006 | 1 | 1:37 | Hawaii, United States | |
| Draw | 4–6–4 | Kazuo Takahashi | Draw | Pancrase - Breakthrough 6 | June 11, 1999 | 2 | 3:00 | Tokyo, Japan | |
| Draw | 4–6–3 | Kengo Watanabe | Draw | Pancrase – Advance 12 | December 19, 1998 | 1 | 15:00 | Tokyo, Japan | |
| Win | 4–6–2 | Izzy Johnson | Submission (choke) | WCNHBC – West Coast NHB Championships 1 | December 8, 1998 | 1 | 3:25 | | |
| Loss | 3–6–2 | Frank Shamrock | TKO (submission to punches) | UFC Brazil | October 16, 1998 | 1 | 7:40 | Brazil | For the UFC Light Heavyweight Championship |
| Loss | 3–5–2 | Joe Pardo | Decision | NG 6 – Neutral Grounds 6 | August 2, 1998 | 1 | 11:00 | | |
| Loss | 3–4–2 | Minoru Suzuki | Decision (lost points) | Pancrase - Advance 7 | June 2, 1998 | 1 | 15:00 | Tokyo, Japan | |
| Loss | 3–3–2 | Ryushi Yanagisawa | TKO (broken ankle) | Pancrase: Alive 11 | December 20, 1997 | 1 | 0:55 | Yokohama, Japan | |
| Draw | 3–2–2 | Osami Shibuya | Draw | Pancrase: Alive 9 | October 29, 1997 | 1 | 15:00 | Tokyo, Japan | |
| Loss | 3–2–1 | Kiuma Kunioku | Decision (lost points) | Pancrase: 1997 Anniversary Show | September 6, 1997 | 1 | 10:00 | Tokyo, Japan | |
| Loss | 3–1–1 | Kevin Jackson | Submission (arm-triangle choke) | EF 4 – Extreme Fighting 4 | March 28, 1997 | 2 | 1:12 | Iowa, United States | |
| Win | 3–0–1 | Frank Shamrock | Decision (split) | SB 3 – SuperBrawl 3 | January 17, 1997 | 1 | 30:00 | Hawaii, United States | |
| Draw | 2–0–1 | Igor Zinoviev | Draw | EF 3 – Extreme Fighting 3 | October 18, 1996 | 3 | 5:00 | Oklahoma, United States | For the Extreme Fighting Middleweight Championship |
| Win | 2–0 | Jamie Faucett | Submission (heel hook) | IFC 2 – Mayhem in Mississippi | August 23, 1996 | 1 | 0:39 | Mississippi, United States | |
| Win | 1–0 | Eric Heberstreit | Submission (rear naked choke) | IFC 1 – Kombat in Kiev | March 30, 1996 | 1 | 3:39 | Ukraine | |
