= Rafael Rebello =

Brazilian mixed martial artist

- Born: October 16, 1980 (age 46); Niterói, Brazil
- Other names: Rafinha
- Height: 5 ft 5 in (1.65 m)
- Weight: 135 lb (61 kg; 9.6 st)
- Division: Bantamweight
- Stance: Orthodox
- Fighting out of: Coconut Creek, Florida, United States
- Team: American Top Team
- Rank: 3rd Degree Black Belt in Brazilian Jiu-Jitsu
- Years active: 2005-present

Mixed martial arts record
- Total: 12
- Wins: 8
- By knockout: 1
- By submission: 5
- By decision: 2
- Losses: 4
- By decision: 4

Other information
- Mixed martial arts record from Sherdog
- Last updated on: February 19, 2012

Rafael Rebello (born October 16, 1980) is a Brazilian mixed martial artist who formerly competed in the bantamweight division for the World Extreme Cagefighting, and now currently competes in the bantamweight division of Fight Time Promotions. Rafael trains with the fighting stable American Top Team and is the Head Trainer at American Top Team Deerfield Beach.

== Mixed martial arts career ==
=== Pacific X-treme Combat ===
Rebello made his PXC debut at PXC 12 - Settling the Score, defeating Jeff Willingham via Submission (Punches).

He continued with a win over Roger Mai via Submission (Armbar) at PXC 13 - Back from the Dead.

Rebello defeated David Cho via Unanimous Decision at PXC 26 - Meanest Game Face on August 20, 2011.

=== World Extreme Cagefighting ===
Rebello made his WEC debut at WEC 39, losing to Kenji Osawa via split decision.

He followed this up with a victory over Kyle Dietz via submission (rear naked choke).

He was then scheduled to fight Scott Jorgensen on October 10, 2009, at WEC 43. However, he was forced to pull out due to an injury.

Rebello was expected to face Will Campuzano on June 20, 2010, at WEC 49, but instead faced WEC newcomer Chris Cariaso. Rebello lost the fight via unanimous decision.

=== Fight Time Promotions ===
Rebello made his Fight Time debut on February 17, 2012, at Fight Time 8 - "It's Fight Time!" against Jim Chaikong with a first round rear-naked choke submission win.

=== Battle Xtreme Championships ===
Rebello made his BXC debut on June 16, 2012, at BXC - The Rise against Bobby Huron with a second round arm-triangle choke win.

== Mixed martial arts record ==
Professional record breakdown
13 matches	9 wins	4 losses
By knockout	1	0
By submission	6	0
By decision	2	4
By disqualification	0	0

Res.	Record	Opponent	Method	Event	Date	Round	Time	Location	Notes
Win	9–4	Bobby Huron	Submission (arm-triangle choke)	BXC - The Rise	June 16, 2012	2	3:59	Springfield, Massachusetts, United States	
Win	8–4	Jimmy Chaikong	Submission (rear naked choke)	Fight Time 8 - "It's Fight Time!"	February 17, 2012	1	3:50	Fort Lauderdale, Florida, United States	
Win	7–4	David Cho	Decision (unanimous)	PXC 26 - Meanest Game Face	August 20, 2011	3	5:00	Manila, Philippines	
Loss	6–4	Chris Cariaso	Decision (unanimous)	WEC 49	June 20, 2010	3	5:00	Edmonton, Alberta, Canada	
Win	6–3	Kyle Dietz	Submission (rear-naked choke)	WEC 41	June 7, 2009	1	2:55	Sacramento, California, United States	
Loss	5–3	Kenji Osawa	Decision (split)	WEC 39	March 1, 2009	3	5:00	Corpus Christi, Texas, United States	
Win	5–2	Roger Mai	Submission (armbar)	PXC 13 - Back from the Dead	November 17, 2007	1	N/A	Mangilao, Guam	
Win	4–2	Jeff Willingham	Submission (punches)	PXC 12 - Settling the Score	July 12, 2007	1		Orlando, Florida, United States	
Win	3–2	Taro Ito	Submission (armbar)	CFC 4 - Combat Fighting Championships	April 28, 2007	1	2:51	Brazil	
Win	2–2	Henrique Bilcalho	TKO (corner stoppage)	WFL 15 - Winter Brawl 2007	February 3, 2007	2	4:00	Revere, Massachusetts, United States	
Loss	1–2	Bill Boland	Decision (majority)	IC 11 - Apocalypse	November 18, 2006	2	N/A	Hammond, Indiana, United States	
Win	1–1	Paul Gorman	Decision (majority)	FFP - Untamed 6	July 16, 2006	3	5:00	Brockton, Massachusetts, United States	
Loss	0–1	Matt Hamilton	Decision (majority)	AFC 12 - Absolute Fighting Championships 12	April 30, 2005	2	5:00	Fort Lauderdale, Florida, United States	
