= UFC on Fuel TV: Muñoz vs. Weidman =

UFC mixed martial arts event in 2012

- The poster for UFC on Fuel TV: Muñoz vs. Weidman
- Promotion: Ultimate Fighting Championship
- Date: July 11, 2012
- Venue: HP Pavilion
- City: San Jose, California
- Attendance: 4,250
- Total gate: $163,495
- Estimated viewers: 211,000

Event chronology
UFC 148: Silva vs. Sonnen II	UFC on Fuel TV: Muñoz vs. Weidman	UFC 149: Faber vs. Barão

UFC on Fuel TV: Muñoz vs. Weidman (also known as UFC on Fuel TV 4) was a mixed martial arts event held by the Ultimate Fighting Championship. The event took place on July 11, 2012, at the HP Pavilion in San Jose, California.

== Background ==
Paul Taylor was expected to face Anthony Njokuani at the event. However, Taylor was forced out of the bout with an injury and replaced by Rafael dos Anjos.

Jon Fitch was expected to face Aaron Simpson at the event. However, Fitch was forced out of the bout, citing a knee injury and replaced by Kenny Robertson.

Brandon Vera was expected to face James Te Huna at the event. However, Vera was pulled from the bout with Te Huna and was tabbed to face Maurício Rua at UFC on Fox: Shogun vs. Vera. While Te Huna faced returning veteran Joey Beltran.

== Results ==
Main Card (Fuel TV)
Weight class				Method	Round	Time	Notes
Middleweight	Chris Weidman	def.	Mark Muñoz	KO (elbow and punches)	2	1:37
Light Heavyweight	James Te Huna	def.	Joey Beltran	Decision (unanimous) (30–26, 30–27, 30–27)	3	5:00
Welterweight	Aaron Simpson	def.	Kenny Robertson	Decision (unanimous) (30–27, 29–28, 29–28)	3	5:00
Middleweight	Francis Carmont	def.	Karlos Vemola	Submission (rear-naked choke)	2	1:39
Bantamweight	T.J. Dillashaw	def.	Vaughan Lee	Submission (rear-naked choke)	1	2:33
Lightweight	Rafael dos Anjos	def.	Anthony Njokuani	Decision (unanimous) (30–27, 30–27, 29–28)	3	5:00
Preliminary Card (Facebook)
Bantamweight	Alex Caceres	def.	Damacio Page	Submission (triangle choke)	2	1:27
Flyweight	Chris Cariaso	def.	Josh Ferguson	Decision (unanimous) (30–27, 30–27, 30–27)	3	5:00
Middleweight	Andrew Craig	def.	Rafael Natal	KO (head kick)	2	4:52
Welterweight	Marcelo Guimarães	def.	Dan Stittgen	Decision (split) (28–29, 29–28, 29–28)	3	5:00
Bantamweight	Raphael Assunção	def.	Issei Tamura	TKO (punches)	2	0:25

== Bonus Awards ==
The following fighters received $40,000 bonuses.

- Fight of the Night: James Te-Huna vs. Joey Beltran
- Knockout of the Night: Chris Weidman
- Submission of the Night: Alex Caceres

== Reported Payout ==
The following is the reported payout to the fighters as reported to the California State Athletic Commission. It does not include sponsor money and also does not include the UFC's traditional "fight night" bonuses.

- Chris Weidman: $44,000 (includes $22,000 win bonus) def. Mark Muñoz: $42,000
- James Te-Huna: $28,000 (includes $14,000 win bonus) def. Joey Beltran: $15,000
- Aaron Simpson: $46,000 (includes $23,000 win bonus) def. Kenny Robertson: $8,000
- Francis Carmont: $20,000 (includes $10,000 win bonus) def. Karlos Vemola: $14,000
- T.J. Dillashaw: $20,000 (includes $10,000 win bonus) def. Vaughan Lee: $8,000
- Rafael dos Anjos: $40,000 (includes $20,000 win bonus) def. Anthony Njokuani: $14,000
- Alex Caceres: $20,000 (includes $10,000 win bonus) def. Damacio Page: $11,000
- Chris Cariaso: $20,000 (includes $10,000 win bonus) def. Josh Ferguson: $8,000
- Andrew Craig: $16,000 (includes $8,000 win bonus) def. Rafael Natal: $12,000
- Marcelo Guimarães: $12,000 (includes $6,000 win bonus) def. Dan Stittgen: $6,000
- Raphael Assunção : $34,000 (includes $17,000 win bonus) def. Issei Tamura: $8,000

== See also ==
- List of UFC events
- 2012 in UFC
