= Vaughan Lee (fighter) =

English mixed martial artist

Vaughan Lee Harvey
- Born: 15 October 1982 (age 44); Birmingham, England
- Nationality: English
- Height: 5 ft 5 in (1.65 m)
- Weight: 135 lb (61 kg)
- Division: Bantamweight; Flyweight
- Reach: 66 in (168 cm)
- Stance: Southpaw
- Fighting out of: Birmingham, England
- Team: Phuket Top Team Thailand
- Years active: 2003–present (MMA)

Mixed martial arts record
- Total: 29
- Wins: 14
- By knockout: 4
- By submission: 7
- By decision: 3
- Losses: 14
- By knockout: 4
- By submission: 6
- By decision: 4
- Draws: 1

Other information
- Mixed martial arts record from Sherdog

Vaughan Lee Harvey (born 15 October 1982) is a retired English mixed martial artist who competed in the Bantamweight division. A professional competitor since 2003, Lee has formerly competed for the UFC and Cage Rage.

== Background ==
Born and raised in Birmingham, England, Lee began training in traditional martial arts at the age of 13.

== Mixed martial arts career ==
=== Early career ===
Lee held an amateur record of 1-0 before making his professional debut on 22 February 2003 against Philly San at Cage Rage 2. He won by TKO in the first second of the first round.

=== Ultimate Fighting Championship ===
In his UFC debut, Lee faced Chris Cariaso on 5 October 2011 at UFC 138, losing via split decision.

Lee faced off with Norifumi Yamamoto on 26 February 2012 at UFC 144. Lee defeated Yamamoto via first round armbar, becoming the first person to submit Yamamoto in his MMA career. The performance also earned Lee Submission of the Night honors.

Lee next faced T.J. Dillashaw on 11 July 2012 at UFC on Fuel TV: Munoz vs. Weidman. He lost the fight via submission in the first round.

Lee next faced Motonobu Tezuka on 16 February 2013 at UFC on Fuel TV: Barão vs. McDonald. He won the fight via unanimous decision.

Lee faced Raphael Assunção on 8 June 2013 at UFC on Fuel TV 10. He lost the fight via armbar submission in the second round.

Lee was expected to face promotional newcomer Sergio Pettis on 16 November 2013 at UFC 167. However, Lee was forced out of the bout due to injury a week before the fight and was replaced by Will Campuzano.

Lee faced Nam Phan on 1 March 2014 at The Ultimate Fighter: China Finale. He won the fight via unanimous decision.

Lee faced Iuri Alcântara on 31 May 2014 at UFC Fight Night 41. He lost the fight by KO early in the first round.

Lee faced Patrick Holohan in a flyweight bout on 18 July 2015 at UFC Fight Night 72. He lost the fight via unanimous decision and was subsequently released from the promotion shortly after.

== Personal life ==
Aside from fighting, Lee works as a personal trainer and has worked with actors such as Scott Adkins whilst his time at UTC Training Centre.

== Mixed martial arts record ==
Professional record breakdown
29 matches	14 wins	14 losses
By knockout	4	4
By submission	7	6
By decision	3	4
Draws	1	

Res.	Record	Opponent	Method	Event	Date	Round	Time	Location	Notes
Loss	14–14–1	Jack Shore	Decision (unanimous)	Cage Warriors 92	24 March 2018	3	5:00	London, England	
Loss	14–13–1	Nathaniel Wood	TKO (punches)	Cage Warriors 82	1 April 2017	2	4:22	Liverpool, England	
Loss	14–12–1	Abdul-Rakhman Dudaev	Decision (unanimous)	WFCA 13	26 December 2015	3	5:00	Grozny, Russia	Return to Bantamweight.
Loss	14–11–1	Patrick Holohan	Decision (unanimous)	UFC Fight Night: Bisping vs. Leites	18 July 2015	3	5:00	Glasgow, Scotland	Flyweight debut.
Loss	14–10–1	Iuri Alcântara	KO (punches)	UFC Fight Night: Muñoz vs. Mousasi	31 May 2014	1	0:25	Berlin, Germany	
Win	14–9–1	Nam Phan	Decision (unanimous)	The Ultimate Fighter China Finale: Kim vs. Hathaway	1 March 2014	3	5:00	Macau, SAR, China	
Loss	13–9–1	Raphael Assunção	Submission (armbar)	UFC on Fuel TV: Nogueira vs. Werdum	8 June 2013	2	1:51	Fortaleza, Brazil	
Win	13–8–1	Motonobu Tezuka	Decision (unanimous)	UFC on Fuel TV: Barão vs. McDonald	16 February 2013	3	5:00	London, England	
Loss	12–8–1	T.J. Dillashaw	Submission (neck crank)	UFC on Fuel TV: Muñoz vs. Weidman	11 July 2012	1	2:33	San Jose, California, United States	
Win	12–7–1	Norifumi Yamamoto	Submission (armbar)	UFC 144	26 February 2012	1	4:29	Saitama, Japan	Submission of the Night.
Loss	11–7–1	Chris Cariaso	Decision (split)	UFC 138	5 November 2011	3	5:00	Birmingham, England	
Win	11–6–1	Mark Jones	TKO (flying knee and punches)	Sprawl 'N Brawl: Revelation	10 July 2011	1	1:29	Birmingham, England	
Win	10–6–1	Ian Cox	Submission (guillotine choke)	Fight UK 4	5 June 2011	1	0:29	Leicester, England	
Win	9–6–1	Rob Bunford	Submission (armbar)	Sprawl 'N Brawl	30 April 2011	1	1:04	Birmingham, England	
Draw	8–6–1	James Doolan	Draw	OMMAC 8	4 December 2010	3	5:00	Liverpool, England	Bantamweight debut.
Win	8–6	Steve McCombe	Submission (rear-naked choke)	Bushido Challenge 2	3 April 2010	1	2:26	Nottingham, England	
Loss	7–6	Ashleigh Grimshaw	Submission (triangle choke)	Cage Gladiators 12	6 June 2009	1	3:32	Liverpool, England	
Win	7–5	Mark Chen	Submission (rear-naked choke)	Angrrr Management 18	13 December 2008	3	N/A	Weston Super Mare, England	Return to Featherweight.
Loss	6–5	David Lee	Submission (rear-naked choke)	Cage Gladiators 7	27 April 2008	1	2:11	Liverpool, England	
Loss	6–4	Brad Pickett	TKO (punches)	Cage Rage: Contenders 6	18 August 2007	3	3:20	London, England	
Win	6–3	Antanas Jazbutis	Decision (unanimous)	Amateur MMA FC 2	17 June 2007	3	5:00	Birmingham, England	Featherweight bout.
Win	5–3	John Waite	TKO (punches)	Angrrr Management 12	17 March 2007	1	N/A	Weston Super Mare, England	
Win	4–3	Denas Banevicius	Submission (rear-naked choke)	Cage Gladiators 3	3 December 2006	1	1:06	Liverpool, England	
Win	3–3	Rob Molineux	TKO (corner stoppage)	Cage Gladiators 2	3 September 2006	1	1:08	Liverpool, England	
Win	2–3	Ben Vickers	Submission (rear-naked choke)	Intense Fighting 5	19 August 2006	1	4:58	England	
Win	1–3	Rob Molineux	TKO (punches)	Cage Rage: Contenders 1	28 May 2006	1	1:46	London, England	
Loss	0–3	Lee Shearwood	Submission (triangle choke)	Angrrr Management 8	14 May 2006	2	1:16	Kidderminster, England	
Loss	0–2	Ricky Moore	Submission (armbar)	Extreme Brawl 5	22 December 2003	1	N/A	Bracknell, England	Lightweight debut.
Loss	0–1	Philly San	TKO (punches)	Cage Rage 2	22 February 2003	2	N/A	London, England	Featherweight debut.

== See also ==
- List of current UFC fighters
- List of male mixed martial artists
