= 2007 Prix de l'Arc de Triomphe =

- Location: Longchamp Racecourse
- Date: October 7, 2007
- Winning horse: Dylan Thomas

The 2007 Prix de l'Arc de Triomphe was a horse race held at Longchamp on Sunday 7 October 2007. It was the 86th running of the Prix de l'Arc de Triomphe.

The winner was Dylan Thomas, a four-year-old colt trained in Ireland by Aidan O'Brien. The winning jockey was Kieren Fallon.

There was a thirty-minute stewards' inquiry after the race, but the original placings were left unchanged.

== Race details ==
- Sponsor: Groupe Lucien Barrière
- Purse: €2,000,000; First prize: €1,142,800
- Going: Good to Soft
- Distance: 2,400 metres
- Number of runners: 12
- Winner's time: 2m 28.5s

== Full result ==
Pos.	Marg.	Horse	Age	Jockey	Trainer (Country)
1		Dylan Thomas	4	Kieren Fallon	Aidan O'Brien (IRE)
2	hd	Youmzain	4	Richard Hughes	Mick Channon (GB)
3	1½	Sagara	3	Thierry Gillet	Jonathan Pease (FR)
4	shd	Getaway	4	Olivier Peslier	André Fabre (FR)
5	½	Soldier of Fortune	3	Johnny Murtagh	Aidan O'Brien (IRE)
6	4	Saddex	4	Torsten Mundry	Peter Rau (GER)
7	¾	Mandesha	4	Christophe Soumillon	Alain de Royer-Dupré (FR)
8	2½	Zambezi Sun	3	Stéphane Pasquier	Pascal Bary (FR)
9	1½	Dragon Dancer	4	Darryll Holland	Geoff Wragg (GB)
10	snk	Authorized	3	Frankie Dettori	Peter Chapple-Hyam (GB)
11	15	Yellowstone	3	Pat Smullen	Aidan O'Brien (IRE)
12	15	Song of Hiawatha	3	David McCabe	Aidan O'Brien (IRE)

- Abbreviations: shd = short-head; hd = head; snk = short-neck

== Winner's details ==
Further details of the winner, Dylan Thomas.

- Sex: Colt
- Foaled: 23 April 2003
- Country: Ireland
- Sire: Danehill; Dam: Lagrion (Diesis)
- Owners: Sue Magnier and Michael Tabor
- Breeder: Tower Bloodstock
