= Strikeforce: Young Guns =

Strikeforce mixed martial arts event in 2007

- The poster for Strikeforce: Young Guns
- Promotion: Strikeforce
- Date: February 10, 2007
- Venue: San Jose Civic Auditorium
- City: San Jose, California, United States
- Attendance: 3,169

Event chronology
Strikeforce: Triple Threat	Strikeforce: Young Guns	Strikeforce: Shamrock vs. Baroni

Strikeforce: Young Guns was a series of mixed martial arts events held by Strikeforce.

== Strikeforce: Young Guns I ==
The inaugural event was held on February 10, 2007. The event took place at the San Jose Civic Auditorium in San Jose, California.

== Results ==
Fight card
Weight class				Method	Round	Time	Notes
Lightweight	Jose Palacios	def.	Miguel Linares	Decision (unanimous)	3	3:00
Bantamweight	Chris Cariaso	def.	Andrew Valladerez	Decision (unanimous)	3	3:00
Women's Lightweight	Michelle Maher	def.	Elaina Maxwell	Decision (unanimous)	3	3:00
Middleweight	Nik Theotikos	def.	Devin Johnson	TKO (punches)	1	0:11
Lightweight	Billy Evangelista	def.	Isaiah Hill	TKO (punches)	1	1:39
Heavyweight	Yohan Banks	def.	Joey Beltran	Decision (unanimous)	3	3:00
Lightweight	Andrew Montanez	def.	David Smith	Decision (unanimous)	3	3:00
Lightweight	Alvin Cacdac	def.	Bobby Sanchez	Submission (heel hook)	2	1:45
Welterweight	Juan Alcain	def.	Mario Rivera	Decision (unanimous)	3	3:00

== Strikeforce: Young Guns II ==
Strikeforce: Young Guns II was an event held on February 1, 2008 at the San Jose Civic Auditorium in San Jose, California.

=== Results ===
Main card
Weight class				Method	Round	Time	Notes
Middleweight	Luke Rockhold	def	Josh Neal	TKO (submission to punches)	1	1:49
Feathereight	Darren Uyenoyama	def	Andrew Valladerez	Submission (rear-naked choke)	1	0:59
Lightweight	Joey Armstrong	def	Sam Spengler	TKO (punches)	1	2:56
Welterweight	Jesse Jones	def	Anthony Alves	KO (punch)	1	2:01
Preliminary card
Featherweight	Alvin Cacdac	def	Evan Esguerra	TKO (submission to punches)	2	2:13
Middleweight	Issac de Jesus	def	Bobby Stack	Submission (guillotine choke)	2	2:52
Heavyweight	Eric Magana	def	Luke Hartwig	TKO (doctor stoppage)	2	5:00
Lightweight	Adam Antolin	def	Hugo Govea	Submission (rear-naked choke)	1	1:31
Welterweight	Jesse Gillespie	def	Dave Martin	Decision (unanimous)	3	5:00

== Strikeforce: Young Guns III ==
Strikeforce: Young Guns III was an event held on September 13, 2008 at the San Jose Civic Auditorium in San Jose, California.

=== Results ===
Main card
Weight class				Method	Round	Time	Notes
Light Heavyweight	Chris Bostick	def	Jorge Interianoaz	Submission (armbar)	1	2:26
Heavyweight	Yohan Banks	def	Michael Diaz	KO (punch)	1	0:19
Flyweight	Adam Antolin	def	Javi Alanis	TKO (punches)	2	1:41
Catchweight (140 lb)	Ryan Bastianelli	def	Hussain Rasouli	Decision (unanimous)	3	5:00
Preliminary card
Lightweight	Alexander Trevino	def	Gennaro Strangis	Decision (unanimous)	3	5:00
Lightweight	Matt Pedro	def	Eric Castile	Submission (rear-naked choke)	2	1:08
Featherweight	David Rasouri	def	Jeremy Tavares	Decision (unanimous)	3	5:00
Lightweight	Mike Davis	def	O.J. Dominguez	Decision (unanimous)	3	5:00

== See also ==
- Strikeforce
- List of Strikeforce champions
- List of Strikeforce events
- 2007 in Strikeforce
- 2008 in Strikeforce
- SSW Young Guns Championship
