= Frank Shamrock =

American mixed martial artist (born 1972)

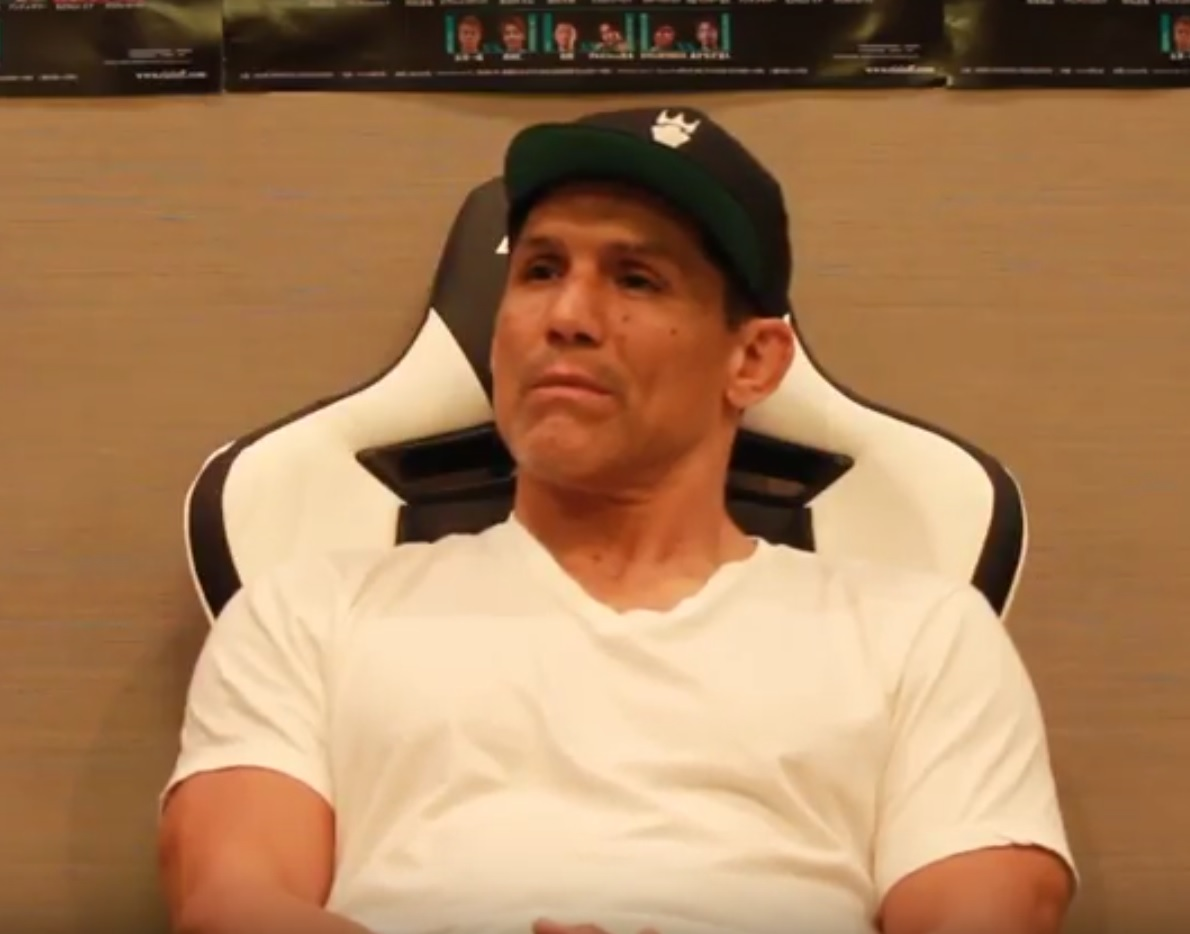
- Shamrock in 2017
- Born: Frank Alisio Juarez III; December 8, 1972 (age 53)
- Nationality: American
- Height: 5 ft 10 in (178 cm)
- Weight: 185 lb (84 kg; 13.2 st)
- Division: Middleweight; Light Heavyweight
- Reach: 71 in (180 cm)
- Fighting out of: San Jose, California
- Team: Lion's Den (1994–98); The Alliance (1998–2010)
- Teachers: Ken Shamrock; Maurice Smith; Javier Mendez
- Rank: 7th degree black belt in submission fighting
- Years active: 1994–2000, 2003, 2006–2010, 2017

Kickboxing record
- Total: 1
- Wins: 1
- By knockout: 1
- Losses: 0

Mixed martial arts record
- Total: 35
- Wins: 23
- By knockout: 5
- By submission: 13
- By decision: 5
- Losses: 10
- By knockout: 4
- By submission: 2
- By decision: 3
- By disqualification: 1
- Draws: 2

Other information
- Children: 2
- Notable relatives: Ken Shamrock (adoptive brother)
- Website: frankshamrock.com
- Mixed martial arts record from Sherdog
- Last updated on: March 13, 2011

Frank Shamrock (born Frank Alisio Juarez III; December 8, 1972) is an American former professional mixed martial artist. Shamrock was the first to hold the UFC Middleweight Championship (later renamed the UFC Light Heavyweight Championship). During his reign, he was considered the No. 1 ranked pound for pound UFC fighter in the world. Shamrock has won numerous titles in other martial arts organizations, including the interim King of Pancrase title, the WEC Light Heavyweight Championship and the Strikeforce Middleweight Championship. Shamrock is regarded as one of the first complete mixed martial artists, having adapted his game from a ground-focused style of fighting to a more well-rounded and versatile style. He is a seventh degree black belt in submission fighting.

He was named "Fighter of the Decade" for the 1990s by the Wrestling Observer, "Best Full Contact Fighter" by Black Belt magazine (1998), and three time "Fighter of the Year" by Full Contact Fighter Magazine.

Shamrock was a color commentator for Showtime Networks, Bellator MMA, Glory Kickboxing and Combate Americas. Shamrock has been a brand spokesman for Strikeforce, VAS, UFC, and K-1 MMA.

He is the adopted brother of Ken Shamrock.

== Early life ==
Born into a Mexican-Native family on December 8, 1972, Frank Juarez was placed in various foster homes, group homes, and crisis centers from the age of twelve onwards. He had many run-ins with law enforcement until eventually he went to live with Bob Shamrock, who with his wife Dede, had taken in thousands of troubled boys (including Frank's older adoptive brother Ken). Juarez went to live with Shamrock at his home in Susanville, California, and was officially adopted by Bob Shamrock at the age of 21, and legally changed his name from Juarez to Shamrock thereafter.

In the early 1990s, Shamrock served three-and-a-half years in the Folsom State Prison after being convicted of burglary.

== Mixed martial arts career ==
=== Pancrase ===
In 1994, Ken began to train Frank in what they referred to as "submission fighting", which essentially was the Pancrase style of catch wrestling modified for No Holds Barred fighting. Frank accompanied his brother to bouts in the Ultimate Fighting Championship (UFC) and grew to love the sport. He became a member of Ken's training school, the Lion's Den, and made his mixed martial arts debut in the Pancrase organization in Japan.

Shamrock debuted as a fighter in Pancrase on December 16, 1994, in one of the biggest events in mixed martial arts history to date, the King of Pancrase tournament. He was an important underdog against top Pancrase fighter Bas Rutten but went on to defeat Rutten in a close decision victory. Shamrock faced off against expert grappler and eventual tournament finalist Manabu Yamada later that night, but was defeated via submission at 8:38 of round 1.

In 1995, Shamrock would get a win over Katsuomi Inagaki, but he faced next his own trainer, MMA legend and Pancrase co-founder Masakatsu Funaki, who defeated him. He would bounce back with a victory over the other founder of the promotion, Minoru Suzuki, getting a KO after a flurry of strikes.

The same year, Frank would also fight a controversial bout with Carlson Gracie BJJ black belt Allan Goes. The Brazilian illegally eye-gouged Shamrock while on his back without the referee noticing, and also refused to release a rear naked choke despite Shamrock using a rope escape, an action which finally gained him a yellow card. On the other hand, Frank retaliated by breaking his leg with a heel hook. Both fighters ended the match with a point lost, and it was ruled a draw despite Goes's penalization.

Shortly after, Shamrock faced Bas Rutten for a second time. He failed to execute his gameplan of taking down Rutten, and the two fell between the ring ropes to the floor in a specially hard-fought attempt. Shamrock then devised a new strategy and started mocking and taunting Rutten during a leglock exchange, in order to get the Dutch fighter angry enough to commit an infraction. The plan was successful, and Frank won a point when Rutten gained a yellow card for hitting him with a closed fist, but Shamrock still lost the match by decision.

On November, Shamrock fought Funaki in a rematch. This time the two fighters traded rope escapes, and Frank caught Funaki in a toehold which made him tap out. Shamrock, however, believes that Funaki took a dive and allowed himself to be defeated in order to build Frank's popularity.

After an injury prevented King of Pancrase Bas Rutten from defending his title, an interim championship was created. Shamrock faced Olympic alternate wrestler and master submission grappler Minoru Suzuki on January 28, 1996, for the vacant belt in a match that drew widespread anticipation. In an epic bout, Shamrock submitted Suzuki with a kneebar at the 22:53 mark of the fight to win the King of Pancrase interim title in front of a sellout crowd in Yokohama.

Shamrock scored decision wins over Ryushu Yanagisawa and Osami Shibuya before facing off against Bas Rutten for the third time for the undisputed King of Pancrase title. Rutten won the bout via TKO due to a cut stoppage when a tired Shamrock received a knee to the forehead in a takedown attempt.

Shamrock then avenged his loss to Manabu Yamada in his next bout, scoring an impressive submission win over the talented grappler. However, after his adopted brother Ken left the organization following a dispute with management, Frank was fired in retaliation.

=== Post-Pancrase ===
On January 17, 1997, he lost to John Lober in Hawaii's Superbrawl by split decision. Despite dominating the first three minutes of the fight, including a leglock which broke Lober's ankle and some strikes which blew out his front teeth, Shamrock's lack of cardio became a factor, and Lober was able to come back and punish him until winning the decision. After his loss, Shamrock shifted the focus of his career exclusively to mixed martial arts. Shamrock then fought top ranked Japanese fighter Tsuyoshi Kohsaka in RINGS and defeated Kohsaka by decision.

Within the Lion's Den, Shamrock trained up-and-coming stars such as Jerry Bohlander, Pete Williams, and Guy Mezger. However, after a falling out with the team's management, he left and formed The Alliance team with Maurice Smith, who he developed a close relationship with. Smith trained him kickboxing along with Javier Mendez, while Shamrock taught Smith his style of submission wrestling. Later, Tsuyoshi Kohsaka himself joined the team.

Cornered by The Alliance, Shamrock fought Enson Inoue in a bout in Vale Tudo Japan '97 that would determine who would fight Kevin Jackson for the newly created UFC Middleweight Championship. After an exciting back and forth battle, in which Shamrock's training proved instrumental to resist the punishment and the exhaustion, Frank knocked Inoue out with a knee, although the match was officially ruled as a disqualification win due to Enson's brother, Egan, running into the ring after Shamrock had knocked out Inoue. Shamrock later stated that this was the toughest fight in his career.

=== Ultimate Fighting Championship ===
After the win over Inoue, Shamrock joined the UFC and fought Kevin Jackson for the newly created UFC Middleweight Championship (later renamed the UFC Light Heavyweight Championship). Jackson had won the middleweight tournament at UFC 14 and was undefeated in MMA at the time, and was also the Olympic gold medalist in freestyle wrestling for the 1992 Summer Olympics. Despite being a heavy underdog, Shamrock armbarred Jackson in just 16 seconds to win the championship.

Shamrock then made his first title defense against then undefeated Extreme Fighting champion Russian Igor Zinoviev at UFC 16. Zinoviev was a feared Russian kickboxer and sambo specialist who held wins over Mario Sperry and Enson Inoue. Shamrock shot a double leg takedown and slammed Zinoviev down so hard that it knocked him unconscious. Zinoviev suffered a broken collarbone and a fractured C-5 vertebra from the slam and had to be carried out on a stretcher. Zinoviev's fight with Shamrock forced him to retire permanently from mixed martial arts ending the Russian's career. Shamrock then defended his belt against Jeremy Horn at UFC 17, submitting him with a kneebar. In October 1998, Shamrock avenged his earlier loss to John Lober by beating him decisively in 7 minutes at UFC Brazil.

In September 1999, Shamrock defended the UFC Middleweight Championship against future UFC Light Heavyweight Champion Tito Ortiz at UFC 22. Ortiz had exploded as a star after his confrontation with Shamrock's brother Ken and his Lion's Den camp at UFC 19. The bout was hyped as a grudge, as Shamrock was a former Lion's Den member who, according to the marketing, was out for revenge against Ortiz. However, this was not necessarily the case because Shamrock had left the Lion's Den on bad terms a year and a half earlier. Despite dominating his opponents in his previous title defenses, Shamrock was considered to be an underdog in this fight; Ortiz had come off convincing wins over Shamrock's former teammates Jerry Bohlander and Guy Mezger and popular opinion was that Ortiz was too big and strong for him to deal with (Ortiz cut weight to fight and by the time he stepped into the cage he would have 25 lb (11 kg; 1.8 st) on Shamrock).

However, in what is widely considered to be one of the greatest fights in UFC history, Shamrock won after brutal elbows, punches, and hammer blows forced Ortiz to tap out at the end of round 4. Shamrock has stated that Ortiz was his toughest opponent physically due to his weight advantage and style of fighting. With this win, Shamrock solidified himself as perhaps the greatest UFC champion in history to that date, going 5–0 in title fights and finishing each fight decisively. After the win, UFC owner Bob Meyrowitz and announcer Jeff Blatnick both praised Shamrock as the greatest competitor in the history of the UFC.

Shamrock then relinquished his title and retired from the UFC. After retiring, he briefly acted as a consultant and commentator for the company. In an interview, UFC president Dana White said:

I've talked to Frank Shamrock many times. Frank Shamrock will lead you to believe that we've never talked and we completely have hated each other forever and everything else. He's a weird guy. He's a very, very weird guy. I can't explain it. Frank is a weird guy.

=== Return ===
After a brief retirement, Shamrock returned to mixed martial arts as a career. He signed a deal to fight Brazilian Jiu-Jitsu standout Elvis Sinosic at K-1, the premiere kickboxing event in the world. Shamrock beat Sinosic via unanimous decision after five three-minute rounds. Later, when Sinosic faced Tito Ortiz for the UFC light-heavyweight title (formerly the middleweight title) at UFC 32, Shamrock served as guest commentator. On August 11, 2001, he took on his former student, Shannon Ritch in a kickboxing match for K-1. Just 56 seconds into the first round, Shamrock broke Ritch's arm with a roundhouse kick and thereby won the match.

Shamrock helped to train UFC veteran B.J. Penn for his early bouts with the UFC at the American Kickboxing Academy and produced his own events Bushido and ShootBox. His first MMA match since 2000 was winning the WEC light-heavyweight championship in under two minutes from Bryan Pardoe by submission in March 2003.

On March 10, 2006, at Strikeforce: Shamrock vs. Gracie, the first MMA event sanctioned by the state of California, he knocked out Cesar Gracie in 21 seconds. Gracie had never fought an MMA match and was 40 years old, so the fight was considered a serious mismatch. However, Gracie is an elite Brazilian Jiu-Jitsu instructor with years of training under his belt as well being the mentor of students such as the Diaz brothers, Nate and Nick.

On September 14, 2006, it was announced that Shamrock had signed a multimillion-dollar contract with startup MMA organization "The World Fighter" and was scheduled to fight in January 2007. However, Shamrock told Sherdog that the World Fighter contract no longer applied because it was entirely contingent on the organization getting a television contract with Showtime; the cable network instead agreed to air fights for the EliteXC promotion.

On February 10, 2007, Shamrock lost his fight by disqualification to Renzo Gracie during the EliteXC event which was televised on Showtime. During the fight, Gracie repeatedly took Frank to the ground, but Shamrock kept active by stopping his positional advance and hitting knee strikes from the bottom. However, Shamrock delivered two of those knees to Gracie's head while both men were on the ground, and after a five-minute injury time out, Gracie was unable to continue. Referee Herb Dean disqualified Shamrock due to a foul (illegal strikes to the back of the head, and knees to the head of a grounded opponent). Dean had already warned Shamrock once earlier in the fight about striking to the back of the head—an illegal move under the Unified Rules of Mixed Martial Arts.

In December 2005, Shamrock opened his first school, Shamrock Martial Arts Academy in San Jose, California. Shamrock trains his students in kickboxing and submission wrestling. He managed Team Shamrock, his own fight team. In June 2006, Shamrock was chosen as a coach for the San Jose Razorclaws of the International Fight League. Debuting against Carlos Newton's Toronto Dragons on September 23, 2006, at the Mark in Moline, Illinois, The Dragons won 3–2. The Razorclaws subsequently lost 2–3 against the Ken Shamrock coached Nevada Lions on January 19, 2007.

=== Strikeforce ===
Shamrock and Phil Baroni had engaged in a war of words with YouTube videos following Shamrock's fight with Renzo Gracie. The two faced off at Strikeforce: Shamrock vs. Baroni, a co-promotion between EliteXC and Strikeforce on June 22, 2007, on pay-per-view.

Shamrock went on to out-strike Baroni in the first part of this fight in the stand-up. Shamrock was docked a point for using strikes to the back of the head while he had Baroni's back. In the second round, Shamrock took some strikes from Baroni, but he was able to regain control and drop Baroni, transition to his back and end the fight with a rear naked choke. Baroni refused to tap out and was choked unconscious. As soon as he regained his senses, he walked over to Shamrock, congratulated him and left the cage. By winning the match, Shamrock became the Strikeforce Middleweight Champion, thereby making him the first person to win a title in all three major North American fight promotions: the UFC, WEC and Strikeforce.

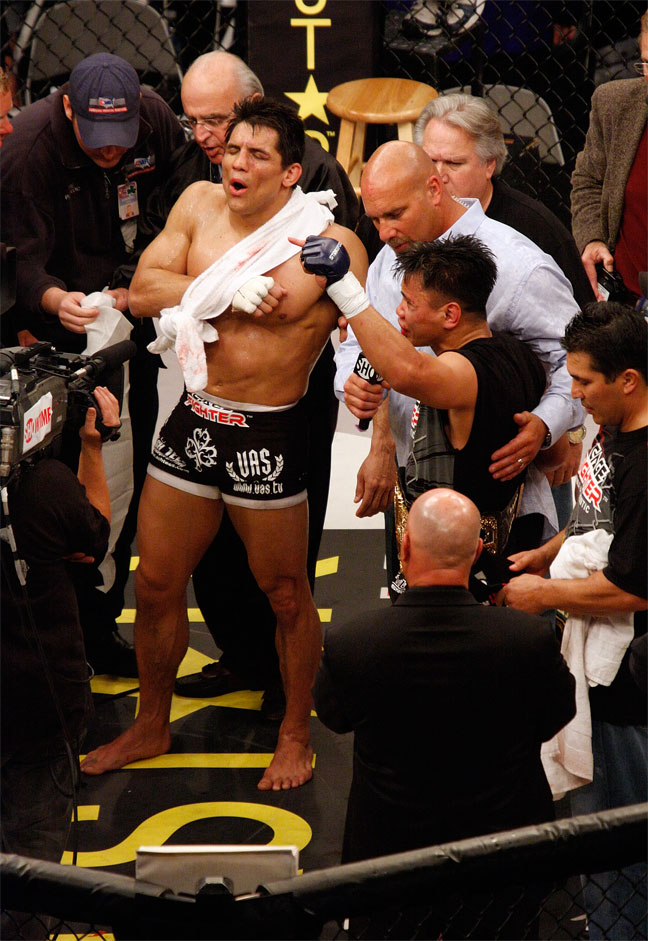
Shamrock and Cung Le after their bout

On January 11, 2008, it was announced that Shamrock would face Cung Le in a match on March 29, 2008, for the Strikeforce Middleweight Championship during the joint Strike force-Elite XC event at the HP Pavilion in San Jose, California. Le arguably controlled the fight, at times out-striking the more MMA-experienced Shamrock. At one point in the later stages of round 3 Shamrock appeared to have Le hurt but was unable to finish him with a barrage of punches against the cage. Le recovered and responded in the closing seconds of the round with more kicks and a spinning back fist. Shamrock was unable to answer the bell to begin round 4 due to a broken arm caused by one of Le's kicks and the fight was ruled a TKO as a result of corner stoppage. Shamrock indicated post-fight that these kicks had broken his right arm.

Frank publicly stated that he would like to face Ken Shamrock in the first quarter of 2009, until stating in an interview "there's no point in fighting Ken, he's finished, why beat on an old man?" causing the likelihood of this fight to now be very slim. Afterwards, he said that he would like to fight Tito Ortiz and then Cung Le and then "do some boxing stuff."

On April 11, 2009, Shamrock was defeated by Nick Diaz by technical knock out.

=== Retirement ===
Shamrock announced his retirement from fighting on June 26, 2010, at Strikeforce: Fedor vs. Werdum.

=== Bellator MMA ===
On February 5, 2013, Shamrock signed with Bellator to coach on the promotions reality series titled Fight Master: Bellator MMA.

== Submission grappling ==
=== RIZIN ===
On October 15, 2017, Shamrock fought Pride veteran Kazushi Sakuraba in a grappling exhibition match at the 2017 Rizin World Grand Prix Opening Round in Fukuoka, Japan. The match ended with a draw decision.

== Fighting style ==
Shamrock became known as a training pioneer, constantly seeking new influences to round up his game. Most of his fighting method rested in Pancrase's indigenous style of shoot wrestling (better known in the West as catch wrestling), but he later also learned orthodox kickboxing striking under Maurice Smith, who also taught him to improve his cardiovascular conditioning and natural athleticism. He also studied Jeet Kune Do before his UFC debut. Shamrock's improved cardio, along with an excellent defensive guard work learned from Tsuyoshi Kohsaka, enabled him to survive against superior opponents in order to seek for openings, which he capitalized on with aggressive strikes and submissions. Though not the first one in history, he was considered one of the greatest earlier mixed martial artists, excelling in all the fields of the game.

== Personal life ==
Shamrock was married to Amy Warren until their separation and subsequent divorce in 2019. Together they have one child, a daughter named Nicolette who was born on April 24, 2008. Shamrock also has a son named Frankie from a previous marriage. Shamrock runs a franchise of schools, a merchandising company, Frank Shamrock, Inc. (a personal asset management company), MMA Entertainment, and Mixed Martial Arts For Law Enforcement (a law enforcement training business).

In 1998, Shamrock had a falling out with his brother Ken and his father Bob; they would not communicate again until Bob became terminally ill years later. In separate interviews aired January 18, 2007 by Sherdog.com's Beatdown radio show, both Frank and Ken said they remain estranged - Frank claimed Ken has spurned all attempts at reconciliation; Ken accused Frank of treating their father poorly. As seen on Frank's Spike TV documentary, Bound by Blood, he and Ken have reconciled. On January 14, 2010, Bob Shamrock died due to health complications from diabetes.

In an interview with Sam Caplan of sportsline.com, Shamrock revealed he felt concerned with Ken's training methods, and when he confronted Ken, he was told "You don't have what it takes, you're not going to be a world champion and I want you to run my gyms for the rest of your life." This spurred him on to leave which led to the estrangement of both Ken and Bob (who took Ken's side in the disagreement). He also stated that he would be happy to fight against Ken, should the opportunity arise.

Shamrock is a commentator and fighter on the EA Sports MMA video game which was released in 2010. Shamrock is also featured in the award-winning documentary on the sport of mixed martial arts titled Fight Life, released in 2013. The film is directed by James Z. Feng and produced by RiLL Films.

Shamrock landed a guest role as Hammer on Walker, Texas Ranger and the main role in a Burger King commercial. He was featured as Damien in the 2005 movie No Rules and was uncredited in an episode of Oz. On November 18, 2010, Shamrock appeared as a guest on Late Night with Jimmy Fallon.

In October 2012, Shamrock released his autobiography Uncaged: My Life as a Champion MMA Fighter. Shamrock also wrote the Wiley book Mixed Martial Arts for Dummies.

Shamrock is an advocate for the use of cannabis, which he says helped eliminate his reliance on pharmaceutical drugs. In January 2017 Shamrock launched The Bakeout, an online talk show seeking to "uplift, unite, educate, challenge, and encourage viewers in a manner consistent with the teachings of the healing powers of cannabis".

On January 14, 2018, sports announcer Mauro Ranallo stated that Shamrock saved his life when Shamrock performed the Heimlich maneuver on Ranallo as he was choking.

In March 2019 Shamrock was reportedly investigated by Dallas police for allegedly leaving one of his mother's dogs, at Love Field airport in Dallas, Texas, for a little under a week.

== Championships and accomplishments ==
- Pancrase Hybrid Wrestling
  - Interim King of Pancrase (One time)
- Ultimate Fighting Championship
  - UFC Light Heavyweight Championship (One time; first)
    - Four successful title defenses
  - UFC Encyclopedia Awards
    - Fight of the Night (Two times) vs. John Lober and Tito Ortiz
    - Knockout of the Night (One time) vs. Igor Zinoviev
    - Submission of the Night (One time) vs. Kevin Jackson
  - Headlined the first UFC event in Brazil
  - Fastest submission in the history of the UFC Light Heavyweight division (0:16)
  - Undefeated in the UFC (5–0)
- Strikeforce
  - First MMA fighter to win championships in UFC, WEC & Strikeforce
  - Strikeforce Middleweight Championship (One time, first)
  - Fastest knockout in Strikeforce history (0:20)
- World Extreme Cagefighting
  - WEC Light Heavyweight Championship (One time, first)
- Sherdog
  - Mixed Martial Arts Hall of Fame
- International Sports Hall of Fame
  - Class of 2022
- Black Belt Magazine
  - 1998 Full-Contact Fighter of the Year
- Wrestling Observer Newsletter
  - 1998 Most Outstanding Fighter
  - 1999 Most Outstanding Fighter
  - 1999 Fight of the Year vs. Tito Ortiz on September 24, 1999
  - 1990s Fighter of the Decade
- Inside MMA
  - 2008 Fight of the Year Bazzie Award vs. Cung Le on March 29
- Fight Matrix
  - 1998 Fighter of the Year
- Martial Arts History Museum Hall of Fame
  - Class of 2015

== Mixed martial arts record ==
Professional record breakdown
35 matches	23 wins	10 losses
By knockout	4	4
By submission	12	2
By decision	5	3
By disqualification	2	1
Draws	2	

Res.	Record	Opponent	Method	Event	Date	Round	Time	Location	Notes
Loss	23–10–2	Nick Diaz	TKO (punches)	Strikeforce: Shamrock vs. Diaz	April 11, 2009	2	3:57	San Jose, California, United States	Catchweight (180 lb) bout.
Loss	23–9–2	Cung Le	TKO (broken arm)	Strikeforce: Shamrock vs. Le	March 29, 2008	3	5:00	San Jose, California, United States	Lost the Strikeforce Middleweight Championship.
Win	23–8–2	Phil Baroni	Technical Submission (rear-naked choke)	Strikeforce Shamrock vs. Baroni	June 22, 2007	2	4:00	San Jose, California, United States	Won the inaugural Strikeforce Middleweight Championship.
Loss	22–8–2	Renzo Gracie	DQ (knees to downed opponent)	EliteXC Destiny	February 10, 2007	2	2:00	Southaven, Mississippi, United States	
Win	22–7–2	Cesar Gracie	KO (punches)	Strikeforce: Shamrock vs. Gracie	March 10, 2006	1	0:20	San Jose, California, United States	Middleweight debut.
Win	21–7–2	Bryan Pardoe	Submission (armbar)	WEC 6: Return of a Legend	March 27, 2003	1	1:46	Lemoore, California, United States	Won the inaugural WEC Light Heavyweight Championship. Shamrock vacated the title in August 2003.
Win	20–7–2	Elvis Sinosic	Decision (split)	K-1 World Grand Prix 2000	December 10, 2000	5	3:00	Tokyo, Japan	
Win	19–7–2	Tito Ortiz	TKO (submission to punches)	UFC 22	September 24, 1999	4	4:50	Lake Charles, Louisiana, United States	Defended the UFC Light Heavyweight Championship. 1999 Fight of the Year. Shamrock vacated the title on November 24, 1999.
Draw	18–7–2	Kiyoshi Tamura	Draw	Rings: Rise 2nd	April 23, 1999	1	20:00	Japan	
Win	18–7–1	John Lober	TKO (submission to punches)	UFC Brazil	October 16, 1998	1	7:40	São Paulo, Brazil	Defended the UFC Light Heavyweight Championship.
Win	17–7–1	Jeremy Horn	Submission (kneebar)	UFC 17	May 15, 1998	1	16:28	Mobile, Alabama, United States	Defended the UFC Light Heavyweight Championship.
Win	16–7–1	Igor Zinoviev	KO (slam)	UFC 16	March 13, 1998	1	0:22	New Orleans, Louisiana, United States	Defended the UFC Light Heavyweight Championship.
Win	15–7–1	Kevin Jackson	Submission (armbar)	UFC Japan	December 21, 1997	1	0:16	Yokohama, Japan	Won the inaugural UFC Light Heavyweight Championship.
Win	14–7–1	Enson Inoue	DQ (Egan Inoue ran into the ring)	Vale Tudo Japan 1997	November 29, 1997	2	7:17	Tokyo, Japan	
Win	13–7–1	Wes Gassaway	DQ (rope escapes)	World Pankration Championships 1	October 26, 1997	1	11:54	Texas, United States	
Win	12–7–1	Tsuyoshi Kohsaka	Decision (unanimous)	Rings: Extension Fighting 7	September 26, 1997	1	30:00	Japan	
Loss	11–7–1	John Lober	Technical Decision (split)	SuperBrawl 3	January 17, 1997	1	30:00	Honolulu, Hawaii, United States	
Loss	11–6–1	Kiuma Kunioku	Decision (unanimous)	Pancrase: Truth 10	December 15, 1996	1	20:00	Tokyo, Japan	
Loss	11–5–1	Yuki Kondo	KO (head kick)	Pancrase: 1996 Anniversary Show	September 7, 1996	1	12:43	Chiba, Japan	
Win	11–4–1	Manabu Yamada	Submission (rear-naked choke)	Pancrase: 1996 Neo-Blood Tournament, Round 1	July 22, 1996	1	12:44	Tokyo, Japan	
Loss	10–4–1	Bas Rutten	TKO (cut)	Pancrase: Truth 5	May 16, 1996	1	11:11	Tokyo, Japan	For the Pancrase Openweight Championship.
Win	10–3–1	Osami Shibuya	Decision (unanimous)	Pancrase: Truth 4	April 8, 1996	1	15:00	Tokyo, Japan	
Win	9–3–1	Ryushi Yanagisawa	Decision (unanimous)	Pancrase: Truth 2	March 2, 1996	1	20:00	Kobe, Japan	
Win	8–3–1	Minoru Suzuki	Submission (kneebar)	Pancrase: Truth 1	January 28, 1996	1	22:53	Yokohama, Japan	Won the interim Pancrase Openweight Championship.
Win	7–3–1	Vernon White	Submission (achilles lock)	Pancrase: Eyes of Beast 7	December 14, 1995	1	5:23	Sapporo, Japan	
Win	6–3–1	Masakatsu Funaki	Submission (toe hold)	Pancrase: Eyes of Beast 6	November 4, 1995	1	10:31	Yokohama, Japan	
Win	5–3–1	Takafumi Ito	Submission (rear-naked choke)	Pancrase: 1995 Anniversary Show	September 1, 1995	1	7:23	Tokyo, Japan	
Loss	4–3–1	Bas Rutten	Decision (split)	Pancrase: 1995 Neo-Blood Tournament Second Round	July 23, 1995	1	15:00	Tokyo, Japan	
Win	4–2–1	Takaku Fuke	Submission (rear-naked choke)	Pancrase: Eyes of Beast 5	June 13, 1995	1	8:16	Sapporo, Hokkaido, Japan	
Draw	3–2–1	Allan Goes	Draw	Pancrase: Eyes of Beast 4	May 13, 1995	1	10:00	Chiba, Chiba, Japan	
Win	3–2	Minoru Suzuki	Submission (rear-naked Choke)	Pancrase: Eyes of Beast 3	April 8, 1995	1	3:23	Nagoya, Japan	
Loss	2–2	Masakatsu Funaki	Submission (toe hold)	Pancrase: Eyes of Beast 2	March 10, 1995	1	5:11	Yokohama, Kanagawa, Japan	
Win	2–1	Katsuomi Inagaki	Submission (rear naked choke)	Pancrase: Eyes of Beast 1	January 26, 1995	1	6:14	Nagoya, Aichi, Japan	
Loss	1–1	Manabu Yamada	Submission (achilles lock)	King of Pancrase tournament opening round	December 16, 1994	1	8:38	Tokyo, Japan	
Win	1–0	Bas Rutten	Decision (majority)	King of Pancrase tournament opening round	December 16, 1994	1	10:00	Tokyo, Japan	

== Kickboxing record ==
Frank Shamrock kickboxing record
1 win (1 (T)KO's)
Date	Result	Opponent	Event	Location	Method	Round	Time	Record
2001-08-11	Win	(United States) Shannon Ritch	K-1 World Grand Prix 2001 in Las Vegas	Las Vegas, Nevada, United States	TKO (injury)	1	0:53	1–0
Legend: Win Loss Draw/No contest Notes

== Submission grappling record ==
Result	Opponent	Method	Event	Date	Round	Time	Notes
Draw	(Japan) Kazushi Sakuraba	Draw	Rizin World Grand Prix 2017: Opening Round - Part 2	October 15, 2017	1	0:56	
Win	(United States) Dan Henderson	Submission (heel hook)	The Contenders	October 11, 1997			

== Footnotes ==
New championship	1st Interim King of Pancrase Champion; January 28, 1996 – May 16, 1996	Vacant Lost unification bout against Bas Rutten
New championship	1st UFC Light Heavyweight Champion; December 21, 1997 – November 19, 1999	Vacant Shamrock retired Title next held by Tito Ortiz
New championship	1st WEC Light Heavyweight Champion; March 27, 2003 – August 2003	Vacant Shamrock vacated the title Title next held by Jason Lambert
New championship	1st Strikeforce Middleweight Champion; June 22, 2007 – March 29, 2008	Succeeded by Cung Le
