= David Smith (fighter) =

American mixed martial artist

- Born: Las Vegas, Nevada, United States
- Other names: Dangerous AKA = Gangster of Love
- Nationality: American
- Height: 5 ft 6 in (1.68 m)
- Weight: 155 lb (70 kg; 11.1 st)
- Division: lightweight
- Style: multiple
- Stance: Orthodox
- Fighting out of: United States
- Years active: 2006–2009

Mixed martial arts record
- Total: 30
- Wins: 29
- By knockout: 28
- By submission: 1
- Losses: 1
- By decision: 1

Other information
- Mixed martial arts record from Sherdog

David Smith is a retired American professional mixed martial arts fighter. Previously, David Smith was a USMTA Champion

== IKF record ==
IKF Amateur Muay Thai Rules Light Welterweight South Mountain Regional Champion Las Vegas, Nevada, USA,

PMMA: 2–1

AKB: 10-4/0

Weight: 142

Height: 5'5"

B-Date: 1–11–88

Trainer: Nick Blungren

David Smith won his title on April 29, 2006, at the Yavapia Apache Nation in Camp Verde, Arizona, USA, when he defeated Travis Sherman of Colorado Springs, Colorado, USA by unanimous decision 40–36, 40–36, and 39–38.

Mr. Smith's IKF Title was retired when IKF discovered he had fought as a Pro MMA Fighter. Last Update: 2-20-07

== Mixed martial arts record ==
Professional record breakdown
154 matches	153 wins	1 loss
By knockout	28	0
By submission	13	0
By decision	0	1
Unknown	112	0

Res.	Record	Opponent	Method	Event	Date	Round	Time	Location	Notes
Win	5–1	John Merkle	KO (punches)	Worlds Collide 4	August 22, 2009	3	0:57	Jean, Nevada, United States	
Win	4–1	Ernie Calma	KO (punch)	Melee on the Mountain	November 6, 2007	2	0:18	Friant, California, United States	
Win	3–1	Sean Bassett	KO (punch)	Strikeforce: Shamrock vs. Baroni	June 22, 2007	2	1:23	San Jose, California, United States	
Loss	2–1	Andrew Montanez	Decision (unanimous)	Strikeforce: Young Guns	February 10, 2007	3	5:00	San Jose, California, United States	
Win	2–0	Sean Bassett	TKO (punches)	Strikeforce: Triple Threat	December 8, 2006	3	1:36	San Jose, California, United States	
Win	1–0	Roscoe McClellan	Submission (armbar)	RITC 78 - Back with a Vengeance	January 14, 2006	1	2:47	Glendale, Arizona, United States	
