= Strikeforce: Shamrock vs. Baroni =

Strikeforce mixed martial arts event in 2007

- The poster for Strikeforce: Shamrock vs. Baroni
- Promotion: Strikeforce and EliteXC
- Date: June 22, 2007
- Venue: HP Pavilion at San Jose
- City: San Jose, California
- Attendance: 9,672
- Buyrate: 35,000

Event chronology
Strikeforce: Young Guns	Strikeforce: Shamrock vs. Baroni	Strikeforce: Playboy Mansion

Strikeforce: Shamrock vs. Baroni was a mixed martial arts event co-promoted by Strikeforce and EliteXC. The event took place on Friday, June 22, 2007 at the HP Pavilion in San Jose, California. The main card aired on pay-per-view, with the undercard streamed live on ProElite.com. The PPV event was rebroadcast on the Showtime premium cable channel on June 30, 2007.

== Results ==
Main Card
Weight class				Method	Round	Time	Notes
Middleweight	Frank Shamrock	def.	Phil Baroni	Submission (rear-naked choke)	2	4:15	(Note: For the inaugural Strikeforce Middleweight Championship.)
Middleweight	Murilo Rua	def.	Joey Villasenor	KO (punches)	2	1:05	(Note: For the inaugural EliteXC Middleweight Championship.)
Middleweight	Cung Le	def.	Tony Fryklund	TKO (punches)	3	0:25
Heavyweight	Paul Buentello	def.	Carter Williams	KO (punches)	2	0:10
Lightweight	Josh Thomson	def.	Nick Gonzalez	Submission (rear-naked choke)	1	1:42
Welterweight	Paul Daley	def.	Duane Ludwig	TKO (punches)	2	0:32
Preliminary card
Lightweight	David Smith	def.	Sean Bassett	KO (punch)	2	1:23
Lightweight	James Edson Berto	def.	Victor Valenzuela	Submission (heel hook)	1	0:47
Middleweight	Nik Theotikos	def.	Nikk Covert	KO (punch)	1	1:13
Welterweight	Mike Pyle	def.	Aaron Wetherspoon	Decision (unanimous)	3	5:00
Welterweight	Luke Stewart	def.	Jason Von Flue	TKO (punches)	3	2:17
Heavyweight	Rex Richards	def.	Ray Seraile	TKO (punches)	1	0:35
Bantamweight	Chris Cariaso	def.	Anthony Figueroa	Decision (unanimous)	3	5:00
Catchweight (179 lb)	Jeffrey Cachia	def.	Shigeru Momoi	Submission (guillotine choke)	1	1:58
Middleweight	Seth Kleinbeck	def.	Sam Spengler	TKO (punches)	2	2:55

== Purses ==
Notable fighter payouts included:

Fighter	Fight Earnings	Notes
Frank Shamrock	$200,000	
Phil Baroni	$100,000	
Cung Le	$45,000	
Murilo Rua	$50,000	Includes $25K win bonus
Paul Buentello	$50,000	Includes $25K win bonus

== Controversy ==
- Frank Shamrock was criticized for pushing an unconscious Phil Baroni off him using his leg rather than allowing the referee to pull Phil off Frank. In a post-fight interview question regarding the incident, Shamrock stated that "[Phil] was heavy on top of me... he was squishing the life out of me... he was laying on my leg and on my chest... that's it. And I thought it looked better on camera.".
- Fighter Carter Williams was found by the CSAC to have tested positive for cocaine. He was fined $1,000 and suspended through Dec 19, 2007.
- Fighter Phil Baroni tested positive for Boldenone and Stanozolol steroid Metabolites according to the California State Athletic Commission (CSAC). He was fined $2,500 and suspended for a year in the state of California. Baroni denied taking any banned substances, and appealed the decision. On October 31, 2007 Baroni's suspension was reduced to 6 months.
- Fighter Jeffrey Cachia faced an undefeated 3-0 Shigeru Momoi who traveled from Okinawa, Japan for the event. After blocking a round house kick from Momoi, Cachia sidestepped and managed to catch Momoi in a guillotine choke causing Momoi to submit at 1:58 in the first round. Many spectators complained Momoi slipped while attempting the roundhouse kick, giving Cachia an open window. Some claimed Cachia got lucky and prior to the fight, most expected the heavy favorite Momoi would be the winner.

== See also ==
- Strikeforce
- List of Strikeforce champions
- List of Strikeforce events
- 2007 in Strikeforce
