= Chris Cariaso =

American mixed martial arts fighter

- Born: Chris Vincent Cariaso; May 27, 1981 (age 45); San Jose, California, United States
- Other names: Kamikaze
- Height: 5 ft 3 in (1.60 m)
- Weight: 125 lb (57 kg; 8.9 st)
- Division: Flyweight; Bantamweight; Featherweight
- Reach: 63 in (160 cm)
- Stance: Southpaw
- Fighting out of: Tucson, Arizona
- Team: Rise Combat Sports
- Rank: Black belt in Brazilian Jiu-Jitsu
- Years active: 2006 – 2015

Mixed martial arts record
- Total: 25
- Wins: 17
- By knockout: 3
- By submission: 2
- By decision: 12
- Losses: 8
- By knockout: 1
- By submission: 3
- By decision: 4

Other information
- Mixed martial arts record from Sherdog

Christopher Vincent Cariaso (born May 27, 1981) is an American former mixed martial artist best known for competing in the Flyweight division of the Ultimate Fighting Championship (UFC), where he contended for the UFC Flyweight Championship once.

== Early and personal life ==
Chris Cariaso was born and raised in San Jose, California. He is of Filipino descent.

== Mixed martial arts career ==
Since turning professional in 2006, Cariaso has competed in several organizations, obtaining wins in large MMA promotions such as Strikeforce and EliteXC, with all of his fights taking place in his native Northern California. He then moved to Tucson, Arizona to train with Rise Combat Sports.

=== ISCF - International Sport Combat Federation ===
Cariaso won the ISCF Bantamweight Title on October 24, 2009, when he defeated Rolando Velasco by TKO at 3:17 of round 2 due to strikes.

=== World Extreme Cagefighting ===
Cariaso made his WEC debut against Rafael Rebello on June 20, 2010, at WEC 49. He won the fight via unanimous decision.

Cariaso next faced Renan Barão on December 16, 2010, at WEC 53. He lost via submission in the first round.

=== Ultimate Fighting Championship ===
On October 28, 2010, World Extreme Cagefighting merged with the Ultimate Fighting Championship. As part of the merger, all WEC fighters were transferred to the UFC.

In his first UFC fight, Cariaso faced Will Campuzano on January 22, 2011, at UFC Fight Night 23. He won the fight via unanimous decision (29-28, 29-28, 29-28).

Cariaso was expected to face Norifumi Yamamoto on May 28, 2011, at UFC 130. However, Yamamoto was forced out of the bout with an injury and replaced by Michael McDonald. Cariaso lost a hard fought split decision to McDonald in a closely contested fight.

Cariaso faced UFC newcomer Vaughan Lee on November 5, 2011, at UFC 138. He won the fight via split decision.

Cariaso faced Takeya Mizugaki on February 26, 2012, at UFC 144. Cariaso defeated Mizugaki via unanimous decision.

Cariaso decided to drop to the flyweight division where he faced Josh Ferguson at UFC on Fuel TV: Munoz vs. Weidman. He won the fight via unanimous decision.

Cariaso fought John Moraga on December 29, 2012, at UFC 155. He was submitted in the third round with a guillotine choke.

Cariaso faced Jussier Formiga on May 18, 2013, at UFC on FX 8. He lost the fight via unanimous decision.

Cariaso next faced Iliarde Santos on October 9, 2013, at UFC Fight Night 29. He won the fight via TKO in the second round.

Cariaso was expected to face Kyoji Horiguchi on February 1, 2014, at UFC 169. However, Horoguchi pulled out of the bout citing injury and was replaced by WEC veteran Danny Martinez. Cariaso won the fight via unanimous decision.

Cariaso faced Louis Smolka on May 10, 2014, at UFC Fight Night 40. He won the fight via split decision.

A rescheduled bout with Kyoji Horiguchi was expected to take place on September 20, 2014, at UFC Fight Night 52. However, on July 15, 2014, it was announced that Cariaso would receive a title shot against UFC Flyweight champion Demetrious Johnson in the co-main event of UFC 177. On August 12, the Johnson/Cariaso bout was moved to the main event of UFC 178. Cariaso lost the bout via submission due to a kimura in the second round.

Cariaso faced Henry Cejudo on March 14, 2015, at UFC 185. He lost the fight by unanimous decision.

Cariaso faced Sergio Pettis on October 3, 2015, at UFC 192. He lost the fight via unanimous decision.

On February 2, 2016, Cariaso announced that he was retiring from active competition.

== Mixed martial arts record ==
Professional record breakdown
| 25 matches | 17 wins | 8 losses |
| By knockout | 3 | 1 |
| By submission | 2 | 3 |
| By decision | 12 | 4 |

| Res. | Record | Opponent | Method | Event | Date | Round | Time | Location | Notes |
|---|---|---|---|---|---|---|---|---|---|
| Loss | 17–8 | Sergio Pettis | Decision (unanimous) | UFC 192 | October 3, 2015 | 3 | 5:00 | Houston, Texas, United States | |
| Loss | 17–7 | Henry Cejudo | Decision (unanimous) | UFC 185 | March 14, 2015 | 3 | 5:00 | Dallas, Texas, United States | |
| Loss | 17–6 | Demetrious Johnson | Submission (kimura) | UFC 178 | September 27, 2014 | 2 | 2:29 | Las Vegas, Nevada, United States | For the UFC Flyweight Championship. |
| Win | 17–5 | Louis Smolka | Decision (split) | UFC Fight Night: Brown vs. Silva | May 10, 2014 | 3 | 5:00 | Cincinnati, Ohio, United States | |
| Win | 16–5 | Danny Martinez | Decision (unanimous) | UFC 169 | February 1, 2014 | 3 | 5:00 | Newark, New Jersey, United States | |
| Win | 15–5 | Iliarde Santos | TKO (punches) | UFC Fight Night: Maia vs. Shields | October 9, 2013 | 2 | 4:31 | Barueri, Brazil | |
| Loss | 14–5 | Jussier Formiga | Decision (unanimous) | UFC on FX: Belfort vs. Rockhold | May 18, 2013 | 3 | 5:00 | Jaraguá do Sul, Brazil | |
| Loss | 14–4 | John Moraga | Submission (guillotine choke) | UFC 155 | December 29, 2012 | 3 | 1:11 | Las Vegas, Nevada, United States | |
| Win | 14–3 | Josh Ferguson | Decision (unanimous) | UFC on Fuel TV: Munoz vs. Weidman | July 11, 2012 | 3 | 5:00 | San Jose, California, United States | Flyweight debut. |
| Win | 13–3 | Takeya Mizugaki | Decision (unanimous) | UFC 144 | February 26, 2012 | 3 | 5:00 | Saitama, Japan | |
| Win | 12–3 | Vaughan Lee | Decision (split) | UFC 138 | November 5, 2011 | 3 | 5:00 | Birmingham, England | |
| Loss | 11–3 | Michael McDonald | Decision (split) | UFC 130 | May 28, 2011 | 3 | 5:00 | Las Vegas, Nevada, United States | |
| Win | 11–2 | Will Campuzano | Decision (unanimous) | UFC: Fight for the Troops 2 | January 22, 2011 | 3 | 5:00 | Fort Hood, Texas, United States | |
| Loss | 10–2 | Renan Barão | Submission (rear-naked choke) | WEC 53 | December 16, 2010 | 1 | 3:47 | Glendale, Arizona, United States | |
| Win | 10–1 | Rafael Rebello | Decision (unanimous) | WEC 49 | June 20, 2010 | 3 | 5:00 | Edmonton, Alberta, Canada | |
| Win | 9–1 | Rolando Velasco | TKO (punches) | LTD: Rumble in Richmond | October 24, 2009 | 2 | 3:17 | Richmond, California, United States | Won the ISCF Bantamweight Championship. |
| Win | 8–1 | Alvin Cacdac | Submission (rear-naked choke) | WCSC: The Awakening | May 30, 2009 | 1 | 3:56 | San Francisco, California, United States | |
| Win | 7–1 | Anthony Figueroa | Submission (rear-naked choke) | Strikeforce: Melendez vs. Thomson | June 17, 2008 | 2 | 4:34 | San Jose, California, United States | |
| Loss | 6–1 | Mark Oshiro | TKO (punches) | ShoXC: Elite Challenger Series | March 21, 2008 | 1 | 2:38 | Friant, California, United States | |
| Win | 6–0 | Rick McCorkell | Decision (unanimous) | ShoXC: Elite Challenger Series | October 26, 2007 | 3 | 5:00 | Santa Ynez, California, United States | |
| Win | 5–0 | Anthony Figueroa | Decision (unanimous) | Strikeforce: Shamrock vs. Baroni | June 22, 2007 | 3 | 3:00 | San Jose, California, United States | |
| Win | 4–0 | David Barrios | KO (head kick) | CCFC: Total Elimination | May 12, 2007 | 2 | 1:34 | Santa Rosa, California, United States | |
| Win | 3–0 | Andrew Valladerez | Decision (unanimous) | Strikeforce: Young Guns | February 10, 2007 | 3 | 3:00 | San Jose, California, United States | |
| Win | 2–0 | Walt Hughes | Decision (unanimous) | Warrior Cup 1 | August 12, 2006 | 3 | 5:00 | Stockton, California, United States | |
| Win | 1–0 | Ralph Alvarado | Decision (unanimous) | ICFO 1: Stockton | May 13, 2006 | 3 | 5:00 | Stockton, California, United States | |

== See also ==
- List of current UFC fighters
- List of male mixed martial artists
