= Joe Lauzon =

American mixed martial arts fighter

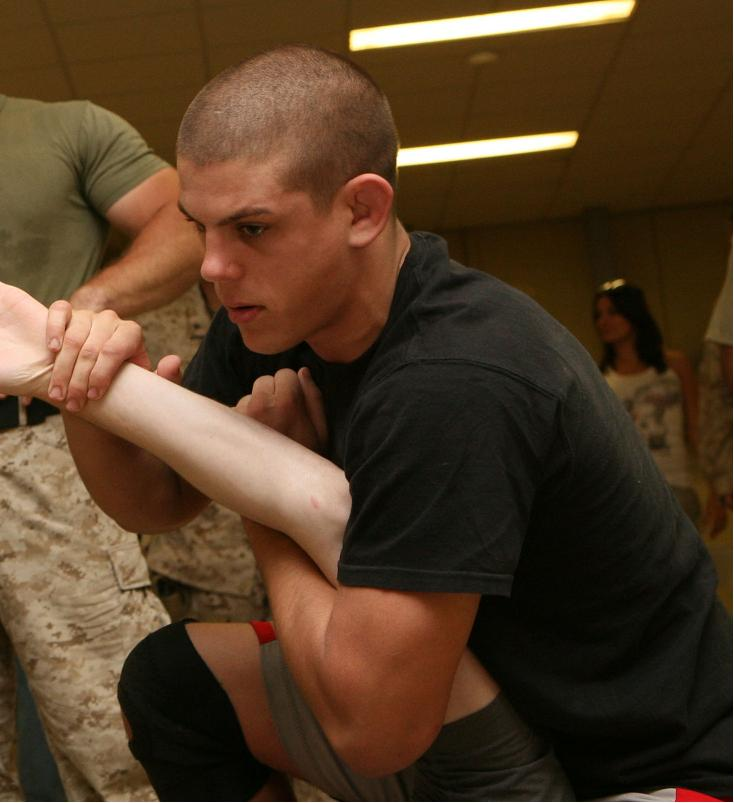
- Lauzon in 2008
- Born: May 22, 1984 (age 42); Brockton, Massachusetts, United States
- Nickname: J-Lau
- Height: 5 ft 11 in (180 cm)
- Weight: 155 lb (70 kg; 11 st 1 lb)
- Division: Lightweight
- Reach: 71 1/2 in (182 cm)
- Style: Brazilian Jiu-Jitsu, Boxing
- Stance: Orthodox
- Fighting out of: Bridgewater, Massachusetts, United States
- Team: Lauzon MMA
- Rank: Black belt in Brazilian Jiu-Jitsu under Danny Savery
- Years active: 2004–2019

Mixed martial arts record
- Total: 43
- Wins: 28
- By knockout: 9
- By submission: 17
- By decision: 2
- Losses: 15
- By knockout: 6
- By submission: 3
- By decision: 6

Amateur record
- Total: 8
- Wins: 5
- Losses: 3

Other information
- Notable relatives: Dan Lauzon (brother)
- Website: joelauzon.com
- Mixed martial arts record from Sherdog

Joseph Edward Lauzon Jr. (born May 22, 1984) is an American semi-retired professional mixed martial artist who competed in the UFC's Lightweight division. Described as a well-rounded fighter, he is tied for most post-fight bonus awards in UFC Lightweight history with fifteen.

== Background ==
Lauzon was born in Brockton, Massachusetts, on May 22, 1984. He lived there until he was in the third grade, when he moved to Bridgewater. Lauzon lived on a small farm and enjoyed riding horses. The young Lauzon and his friends were interested in professional wrestling, and would re-enact moves on Lauzon's trampoline. Lauzon did not begin training in the martial arts until his junior year at East Bridgewater High School, after seeing a demonstration that piqued his interest. Lauzon graduated from Wentworth Institute of Technology in 2007 with a Bachelor's degree in computer science. He worked as a network administrator in Cambridge, Massachusetts before he began training in mixed martial arts full-time.

== Mixed martial arts career ==
=== Early career ===
Lauzon's first amateur fight was in 2002. He held a 5–3 record as an amateur.

In 2004, Lauzon had his first cage fight, winning with a first round armbar in a local Massachusetts promotion, Mass Destruction. Lauzon then went on an eight fight winning streak with all the fights ending via submission. Lauzon won an eight-man tournament, defeating three fighters in one night in the World Fighting League and was crowned the WFL Grand Prix Champion. Lauzon was also named 2004 Massachusetts fighter of the year by local Massachusetts MMA outlets.

Lauzon has been sponsored throughout his career by independent record label Massachusetts-based Deathwish Inc.

=== The Ultimate Fighter ===
Lauzon was a contestant on The Ultimate Fighter 5, which featured lightweights exclusively. He was on B.J. Penn's team, against a team coached by Jens Pulver. Lauzon defeated Brian Geraghty in the preliminary round. He then defeated Cole Miller in the quarterfinals. The win was somewhat controversial due to an illegal strike to the back of Miller's head. Miller appeared obviously dazed by the illegal strike and was given time to recover. However, when action was restarted, it was clear that Cole was still feeling the effects of the strike. Lauzon capitalized on it and won the fight. In the semi-finals, Lauzon lost a unanimous decision to Manvel Gamburyan. At the finale, he defeated Brandon Melendez via submission (triangle choke) at 2:09 of round two. This fight earned him a Submission of the Night award.

=== Ultimate Fighting Championship ===
Prior to competing on The Ultimate Fighter 5, Lauzon had made his debut in the UFC upsetting former UFC Lightweight Champion Jens Pulver at UFC 63 on September 23, 2006, winning via KO in 48 seconds and beating 7-to-1 odds. He was awarded a Knockout of the Night award.

At UFC 78 Lauzon submitted previously undefeated Jason Reinhardt by rear-naked choke in the first round. Lauzon quickly took Reinhardt down before moving to the north–south position. Reinhardt rolled, giving Lauzon his back, and Lauzon quickly sunk in the rear-naked choke for a quick submission victory.

On April 2, 2008, Kenny Florian defeated Lauzon in the main event of UFC Fight Night 13 by TKO via strikes from mount in the second round. The first round was back and forth as Florian opened up a cut on Lauzon's head with elbows and took his back while Lauzon landed several takedowns and attempted several submissions. Florian opened the second round with a takedown and soon advanced to mount where he landed multiple unanswered strikes until the fight was waved off. This fight earned him a Fight of the Night award.

Lauzon defeated Kyle Bradley by technical knockout in round two at UFC Fight Night 15 on September 17, 2008. In the first round Bradley connected with a punch and rocked Lauzon. Lauzon managed to recover and continued to trade with Bradley in a close first round. In the second round Lauzon scored a takedown and transitioned quickly into mount before taking Bradley's back. Lauzon landed several punches from this position until the referee stepped in to save Bradley.

Lauzon was scheduled to fight former WEC Lightweight Champion, Hermes Franca on February 7, 2009, in the main event for UFC Fight Night 17. However, Franca pulled out of the event with a torn anterior cruciate ligament in his right knee. Jeremy Stephens stepped in as a late replacement. Lauzon defeated Stephens by armbar in the second round, which earned him a Submission of the Night bonus award.

Lauzon fought Sam Stout on January 2, 2010, at UFC 108 and lost in a very entertaining fight by decision, which also won Fight of the Night bonus award.

Lauzon was expected to face Terry Etim on August 28, 2010, at UFC 118, but Etim had to withdraw from the bout due to injury. Lauzon was instead set to fight fellow Ultimate Fighter season 5 castmate Gabe Ruediger. During the UFC 118 weigh-ins Ruediger brought Lauzon a cake that read "Sorry for your loss". Lauzon defeated Ruediger, who is a black belt in Brazilian jiu-jitsu, via armbar in 2:01 of round one having completely dominated him for the entire fight. The submission earned him a Submission of the Night award. According to commentator Joe Rogan, Gabe "was never in it for a second."

Lauzon faced George Sotiropoulos on November 20, 2010, at UFC 123. The fight began with an action-packed first round, that saw Lauzon set the pace. However, by the end of the round, Lauzon began to tire and saw Sotiropoulos began to gain momentum. The second round saw a fatigued and passive Joe Lauzon. After a scramble, Sotiropoulous ended up on top position and torqued a kimura to force the tap-out. Both fighters earned a Fight of the Night bonus award.

Lauzon faced Curt Warburton on June 26 at UFC on Versus 4. Lauzon defeated Warburton via first round kimura, which earned him a Submission of the Night bonus award.

Lauzon was briefly linked to a bout with Charles Oliveira on November 19, 2011, at UFC 138. However, Oliveira instead faced Donald Cerrone on August 14, 2011, at UFC Live: Hardy vs. Lytle, replacing an injured Paul Taylor.

Lauzon defeated Melvin Guillard on October 8, 2011, by rear-naked choke at UFC 136, earning his fourth Submission of the Night honor and sixth straight UFC Bonus award.

Lauzon faced Anthony Pettis on February 26, 2012, at UFC 144 He lost the fight by KO due to a head kick in 91 seconds.

Lauzon was again expected to face Terry Etim on August 4, 2012, at UFC on Fox 4. However, Etim was forced out of the bout with an injury and replaced by Jamie Varner. In a back-and-forth fight that saw both men rocked, Lauzon secured the victory after locking in a triangle choke on Varner at 2:44 of the third round. His performance earned him the Fight of the Night and Submission of the Night honors and a Fight of the Year nomination at the World MMA Awards.

Lauzon was expected to face Gray Maynard on December 29, 2012, at UFC 155. However, Maynard pulled out of the bout citing a knee injury and was replaced by Jim Miller. Miller defeated Lauzon via unanimous decision. The back and forth action earned both participants Fight of the Night honors.

Lauzon faced Michael Johnson on August 17, 2013, at UFC Fight Night 26. He was defeated by unanimous decision, after being outmatched by Johnson.

Lauzon faced Mac Danzig on December 14, 2013, at UFC on Fox 9. He won the fight via unanimous decision.

Lauzon faced Michael Chiesa on September 5, 2014, at UFC Fight Night 50. After a back and forth fight, Lauzon defeated Chiesa via TKO in the second round after opening a significant cut above Chiesa's right eye, forcing a doctor's stoppage. The performance earned both participants Fight of the Night honors.

Lauzon was expected to face Diego Sanchez on November 15, 2014, at UFC 180, replacing an injured Norman Parke. However, on October 23, it was announced that injuries to both Sanchez and Lauzon led to the pairing being scrapped altogether.

Lauzon next faced Al Iaquinta on January 31, 2015, at UFC 183. Lauzon lost the fight via TKO in the second round.

As the first bout of his new eight-fight contract, Lauzon faced Takanori Gomi on July 25, 2015, at UFC on Fox 16. After successfully taking Gomi down, he won the fight via TKO in the first round.

Lauzon faced Evan Dunham on December 11, 2015, at The Ultimate Fighter 22 Finale. He lost the fight by unanimous decision.

Lauzon faced Diego Sanchez on July 9, 2016, at UFC 200. He won the fight via TKO in the first round, becoming the first man to finish Sanchez by strikes. The win earned him his first Performance of the Night bonus award.

After sustaining virtually no damage during his previous fight, Lauzon was quickly rescheduled to rematch Jim Miller on August 27, 2016, at UFC on Fox 21. Lauzon lost the rematch by split decision. Both participants were awarded a Fight of the Night bonus.

Lauzon next faced Marcin Held on January 15, 2017, at UFC Fight Night 103. He was awarded a controversial split decision victory, even stating he felt he lost the bout post-fight. Likewise, 16 out of 17 media pundits scored the bout for Held; the lone holdout scored the fight a draw.

Lauzon next faced Stevie Ray on April 22, 2017, at UFC Fight Night 108. Lauzon lost the bout by a majority decision.

Lauzon faced Clay Guida on November 11, 2017, at UFC Fight Night 120. He lost the fight via technical knockout in round one.

As the first bout of his new four-fight contract, Lauzon faced Chris Gruetzemacher on April 7, 2018, at UFC 223. He lost this fight after his corner stopped the fight after the second round.

After an 18-month hiatus, Lauzon faced Jonathan Pearce on October 18, 2019, at UFC on ESPN 6. He won the fight via technical knockout in round one.

After another 31-month hiatus, Lauzon was scheduled to face Donald Cerrone on April 30, 2022, at UFC Fight Night 208. The bout was moved to May 7, 2022, at UFC 274 for undisclosed reasons. Despite both competitors weighing in, the bout was cancelled the day of the event due to Cerrone falling ill. The pair was rescheduled to meet at UFC on ESPN 37 on June 18, 2022. The bout was yet again scrapped the day of this event due to Lauzon's knee dislocating and being unable to straighten.

In May 2022, Lauzon announced that he was semi-retired, saying that he wouldn’t come back unless there was something highly intriguing for him.

== Bare-knuckle boxing ==
Lauzon made his debut with Bare Knuckle Fighting Championship against Stash Kuykendall on August 29, 2026 at BKFC 92. He won the fight by technical knockout in the second round.

== Personal life ==
Lauzon's younger brother, Dan, is also a mixed martial artist.

Lauzon's moniker, 'J-Lau', was given by his friends whom he trained with when he was in high school. Lauzon did not fancy his nickname as it is a reference to Jennifer Lopez, and would prefer his nickname to be 'Baby Joe' instead.

Lauzon and his wife Katie have two sons, the eldest of whom was diagnosed with stage 4S neuroblastoma a week after he was born. He was finally cleared as cancer-free in early 2019.

== Championships and accomplishments ==
- Ultimate Fighting Championship
  - Fight of the Night (Seven times) vs. Kenny Florian, Sam Stout, George Sotiropoulos, Jamie Varner, Jim Miller (2), & Michael Chiesa
    - Tied (Diego Sanchez, Jim Miller & Max Holloway) for seventh most Fight of the Night bonuses in UFC history (7)
  - Knockout of the Night (One time) vs. Jens Pulver
  - Submission of the Night (Six times) vs. Brandon Melendez, Jeremy Stephens, Gabe Ruediger, Curt Warburton, Melvin Guillard, & Jamie Varner
    - Most submission of the Night bonuses in UFC history (6)
  - Performance of the Night (One time) vs. Diego Sanchez
    - Tied (Charles Oliveira & Jim Miller) for second most Post-Fight bonuses in UFC Lightweight division history (15)
    - Tied (Dustin Poirier) for sixth Post-Fight bonus awards in UFC history (15)
  - Third most finishes in UFC Lightweight division history (13)
    - Third most first-round finishes in UFC Lightweight division history (8)
  - Tied (Gleison Tibau) for fifth most bouts in UFC Lightweight division history (27)
  - Tied (Nate Diaz) for fourth most submissions in UFC Lightweight division history (7)
  - UFC.com Awards
    - 2006: Ranked #7 Knockout of the Year vs. Jens Pulver
    - 2009: Ranked #5 Submission of the Year vs. Jeremy Stephens
    - 2010: Ranked #7 Fight of the Year vs. George Sotiropoulos
    - 2011: Ranked #4 Submission of the Year vs. Curt Warburton
    - 2012: Fight of the Year vs. Jim Miller 1
- United States Kickboxing Association
  - USKBA U.S. Super Welterweight Championship (one time)
- World Fighting League
  - WFL Grand Prix Champion
- World MMA Awards
  - 2012 Fight of the Year vs. Jamie Varner at UFC on Fox: Shogun vs. Vera
- Massachusetts MMA outlets
  - 2004 Massachusetts Fighter of the Year Honors

== Mixed martial arts record ==
Professional record breakdown
43 matches	28 wins	15 losses
By knockout	9	6
By submission	17	3
By decision	2	6

Res.	Record	Opponent	Method	Event	Date	Round	Time	Location	Notes
Win	28–15	Jonathan Pearce	TKO (punches)	UFC on ESPN: Reyes vs. Weidman	October 18, 2019	1	1:33	Boston, Massachusetts, United States	
Loss	27–15	Chris Gruetzemacher	TKO (corner stoppage)	UFC 223	April 7, 2018	2	5:00	Brooklyn, New York, United States	
Loss	27–14	Clay Guida	TKO (punches and elbows)	UFC Fight Night: Poirier vs. Pettis	November 11, 2017	1	1:07	Norfolk, Virginia, United States	
Loss	27–13	Stevie Ray	Decision (majority)	UFC Fight Night: Swanson vs. Lobov	April 22, 2017	3	5:00	Nashville, Tennessee, United States	
Win	27–12	Marcin Held	Decision (split)	UFC Fight Night: Rodríguez vs. Penn	January 15, 2017	3	5:00	Phoenix, Arizona, United States	
Loss	26–12	Jim Miller	Decision (split)	UFC on Fox: Maia vs. Condit	August 27, 2016	3	5:00	Vancouver, British Columbia, Canada	Fight of the Night.
Win	26–11	Diego Sanchez	TKO (punches)	UFC 200	July 9, 2016	1	1:26	Las Vegas, Nevada, United States	Performance of the Night.
Loss	25–11	Evan Dunham	Decision (unanimous)	The Ultimate Fighter: Team McGregor vs. Team Faber Finale	December 11, 2015	3	5:00	Las Vegas, Nevada, United States	
Win	25–10	Takanori Gomi	TKO (punches)	UFC on Fox: Dillashaw vs. Barão 2	July 25, 2015	1	2:37	Chicago, Illinois, United States	
Loss	24–10	Al Iaquinta	TKO (punches)	UFC 183	January 31, 2015	2	3:34	Las Vegas, Nevada, United States	
Win	24–9	Michael Chiesa	TKO (doctor stoppage)	UFC Fight Night: Jacare vs. Mousasi	September 5, 2014	2	2:14	Mashantucket, Connecticut, United States	Fight of the Night.
Win	23–9	Mac Danzig	Decision (unanimous)	UFC on Fox: Johnson vs. Benavidez 2	December 14, 2013	3	5:00	Sacramento, California, United States	
Loss	22–9	Michael Johnson	Decision (unanimous)	UFC Fight Night: Shogun vs. Sonnen	August 17, 2013	3	5:00	Boston, Massachusetts, United States	
Loss	22–8	Jim Miller	Decision (unanimous)	UFC 155	December 29, 2012	3	5:00	Las Vegas, Nevada, United States	Fight of the Night. Fight of the Year (2012).
Win	22–7	Jamie Varner	Submission (triangle choke)	UFC on Fox: Shogun vs. Vera	August 4, 2012	3	2:44	Los Angeles, California, United States	Submission of the Night. Fight of the Night.
Loss	21–7	Anthony Pettis	KO (head kick and punches)	UFC 144	February 26, 2012	1	1:21	Saitama, Japan	
Win	21–6	Melvin Guillard	Submission (rear-naked choke)	UFC 136	October 8, 2011	1	0:47	Houston, Texas, United States	Submission of the Night.
Win	20–6	Curt Warburton	Submission (kimura)	UFC Live: Kongo vs. Barry	June 26, 2011	1	1:58	Pittsburgh, Pennsylvania, United States	Submission of the Night.
Loss	19–6	George Sotiropoulos	Submission (kimura)	UFC 123	November 20, 2010	2	2:43	Auburn Hills, Michigan, United States	Fight of the Night.
Win	19–5	Gabe Ruediger	Submission (armbar)	UFC 118	August 28, 2010	1	2:01	Boston, Massachusetts, United States	Submission of the Night.
Loss	18–5	Sam Stout	Decision (unanimous)	UFC 108	January 2, 2010	3	5:00	Las Vegas, Nevada, United States	Fight of the Night.
Win	18–4	Jeremy Stephens	Submission (armbar)	UFC Fight Night: Lauzon vs. Stephens	February 7, 2009	2	4:43	Tampa, Florida, United States	Submission of the Night.
Win	17–4	Kyle Bradley	TKO (punches)	UFC Fight Night: Diaz vs. Neer	September 18, 2008	2	1:34	Omaha, Nebraska, United States	
Loss	16–4	Kenny Florian	TKO (punches and elbows)	UFC Fight Night: Florian vs. Lauzon	April 2, 2008	2	3:28	Broomfield, Colorado, United States	Fight of the Night.
Win	16–3	Jason Reinhardt	Submission (rear-naked choke)	UFC 78	November 17, 2007	1	1:14	Newark, New Jersey, United States	
Win	15–3	Brandon Melendez	Submission (triangle choke)	The Ultimate Fighter 5 Finale	June 23, 2007	2	2:09	Las Vegas, Nevada, United States	Catchweight (157 lb) bout; Melendez missed weight. Submission of the Night.
Win	14–3	Jens Pulver	KO (punches)	UFC 63	September 23, 2006	1	0:48	Anaheim, California, United States	Knockout of the Night.
Win	13–3	Douglas Brown	Submission (armbar)	WFL 6: Real: No Fooling Around	April 1, 2006	1	1:47	Revere, Massachusetts, United States	Won the WFL Grand Prix.
Win	12–3	Zane Baker	KO (slam)	WFL 6: Real: No Fooling Around	April 1, 2006	1	3:39	Revere, Massachusetts, United States	
Win	11–3	Adam Comfort	Submission (achilles lock)	WFL 6: Real: No Fooling Around	April 1, 2006	1	1:44	Revere, Massachusetts, United States	
Loss	10–3	Raphael Assunção	Submission (armbar)	Absolute Fighting Championships 15	February 18, 2006	2	4:37	Fort Lauderdale, Florida, United States	
Win	10–2	Antoine Skinner	Submission (triangle choke)	CZ 12: Night of Champions	November 5, 2005	1	1:00	Revere, Massachusetts, United States	Defended the Combat Zone Lightweight Championship.
Loss	9–2	Ivan Menjivar	Submission (calf slicer)	APEX: Undisputed	September 3, 2005	1	3:39	Montreal, Quebec, Canada	
Win	9–1	Tim Honeycutt	TKO (punches)	Absolute Fighting Championships 13	July 30, 2005	1	0:11	Fort Lauderdale, Florida, United States	
Loss	8–1	Jorge Masvidal	TKO (punches)	Absolute Fighting Championships 12	April 30, 2005	2	3:57	Fort Lauderdale, Florida, United States	
Win	8–0	Joe Ahlert	Submission (guillotine choke)	Mass Destruction 19	February 26, 2005	3	3:47	Boston, Massachusetts, United States	Won the vacant Mass Destruction Lightweight Championship.
Win	7–0	Ryan Ciotoli	Technical Submission (armbar)	CZ 9: Hot Like Fire	December 14, 2004	3	0:34	Revere, Massachusetts, United States	Defended the Combat Zone Lightweight Championship.
Win	6–0	Mike Brown	Submission (rear-naked choke)	CZ 8: Street Justice	October 2, 2004	3	2:14	Revere, Massachusetts, United States	Won the vacant Combat Zone Lightweight Championship.
Win	5–0	Justin Blasich	Submission (rear-naked choke)	Mass Destruction 17	August 28, 2004	1	1:02	Boston, Massachusetts, United States	
Win	4–0	Renat Myzabekov	Submission (toe hold)	CZ 7: Gravel Pit	July 10, 2004	1	0:40	Revere, Massachusetts, United States	
Win	3–0	Kyle Sprouse	Submission (heel hook)	CZ 6: Rampage	June 26, 2004	1	0:26	Taunton, Massachusetts, United States	
Win	2–0	Jerry Mosquea	TKO (punches)	MMA: Eruption	April 30, 2004	1	2:37	Lowell, Massachusetts, United States	
Win	1–0	David Gilrein	Submission (armbar)	Mass Destruction 15	February 21, 2004	1	3:42	Boston, Massachusetts, United States	

== Mixed martial arts exhibition record ==
Professional record breakdown
3 matches	2 wins	1 loss
By knockout	1	0
By submission	1	0
By decision	0	1

Res.	Record	Opponent	Method	Event	Date	Round	Time	Location	Notes
Loss	2–1	Manvel Gamburyan	Decision (unanimous)	The Ultimate Fighter 5	June 14, 2007 (air date)	3	5:00	Las Vegas, Nevada, United States	TUF 5 semi-final.
Win	2–0	Cole Miller	TKO (punches)	The Ultimate Fighter 5	May 24, 2007 (air date)	2	3:58	Las Vegas, Nevada, United States	TUF 5 quarterfinal.
Win	1–0	Brian Geraghty	Submission (rear-naked choke)	The Ultimate Fighter 5	May 10, 2007 (air date)	1	1:13	Las Vegas, Nevada, United States	TUF 5 elimination round.

== Submission grappling record ==
1 Matches, 0 Wins, 1 Losses, 0 Draws
Result	Rec.	Opponent	Method	Event	Date	Division	Location
Loss	0–1	(United States) Dillon Danis	Submission (D'Arce Choke)	Metamoris 6	May 9, 2015	Openweight	Los Angeles, California, United States

== Bare-knuckle boxing record ==
Professional record breakdown
1 match	1 win	0 losses
By knockout	1	0

Res.	Record	Opponent	Method	Event	Date	Round	Time	Location	Notes
Win	1–0	Stash Kuykendall	TKO (punches)	BKFC 92	August 29, 2026	2	0:49	Boston, Massachusetts, United States	

== See also ==
- List of male mixed martial artists
