= 2006 in Shooto =

Mixed martial arts events

Information
- First date: February 17, 2006
- Last date: December 2, 2006

Events
- Total events: 26

Fights
- Total fights: 186
- Title fights: 6

Chronology
2005 in Shooto	2006 in Shooto	2007 in Shooto

The year 2006 is the 18th year in the history of Shooto, a mixed martial arts promotion based in Japan. In 2006 Shooto held 26 events beginning with, Shooto: The Victory of the Truth.

== Title fights ==
Title fights in 2006
Weight class				Method	Round	Time	Event	Notes
Lightweight	Tatsuya Kawajiri (c)	def.	Joachim Hansen	DQ (Kick to Groin)	1	0:08	Shooto: The Victory of the Truth	(Note: For the Lightweight Championship.)
Welterweight	Shinya Aoki	def.	Akira Kikuchi (c)	Decision (Unanimous)	3	5:00	Shooto: The Victory of the Truth	(Note: For the Welterweight Championship.)
Flyweight	Mamoru Yamaguchi (c)	vs.	Shinichi Kojima	Draw	3	5:00	Shooto: 3/24 in Korakuen Hall	(Note: For the Flyweight Championship.)
Featherweight	Takeshi Inoue	def.	Antonio Carvalho	TKO (Punches)	1	3:06	Shooto: The Devilock	(Note: For the Featherweight Championship.)
Bantamweight	Akitoshi Hokazono	def.	Kenji Osawa	Decision (Unanimous)	3	5:00	Shooto 2006: 7/21 in Korakuen Hall	(Note: For the Bantamweight Championship.)
Flyweight	Shinichi Kojima	def.	Mamoru Yamaguchi (c)	Technical Submission (Rear-Naked Choke)	1	1:38	Shooto: Champion Carnival	(Note: For the Flyweight Championship.)

== Events list ==
#	Event title	Date	Arena	Location
211	Shooto: Rookie Tournament Final	December 2, 2006	Shinjuku Face	Tokyo, Japan
210	Shooto: 11/30 in Kitazawa Town Hall	November 30, 2006	Kitazawa Town Hall	Setagaya, Tokyo, Japan
209	Shooto: Gig Central 11	November 26, 2006	Zepp Nagoya	Nagoya, Aichi, Japan
208	G-Shooto: G-Shooto Special03	November 19, 2006	Shin-Kiba 1st Ring	Tokyo, Japan
207	Shooto: 11/10 in Korakuen Hall	November 10, 2006	Korakuen Hall	Tokyo, Japan
206	Shooto: Gig West 6	November 4, 2006	Azalea Taisho Hall	Osaka, Kansai, Japan
205	G-Shooto: Special 02	October 20, 2006	Tokyo Kinema Club	Tokyo, Japan
204	Shooto: Champion Carnival	October 14, 2006	Pacifico Yokohama	Yokohama, Kanagawa, Japan
203	Shooto 2006: 10/1 in Kitazawa Town Hall	October 1, 2006	Kitazawa Town Hall	Setagaya, Tokyo, Japan
202	Shooto: Gig Central 10	September 17, 2006	Zepp Nagoya	Nagoya, Aichi, Japan
201	Shooto 2006: 9/8 in Korakuen Hall	September 8, 2006	Korakuen Hall	Tokyo, Japan
200	G-Shooto: Wrestle Expo 2006	August 19, 2006	Tokyo Waterfront Center	Tokyo, Japan
199	Shooto: Shooting Star	July 30, 2006	Kitazawa Town Hall	Setagaya, Tokyo, Japan
198	Shooto 2006: 7/21 in Korakuen Hall	July 21, 2006	Korakuen Hall	Tokyo, Japan
197	G-Shooto: G-Shooto 06	June 11, 2006	Kitazawa Town Hall	Setagaya, Tokyo, Japan
196	Shooto: Gig West 5	June 3, 2006	Azalea Taisho Hall	Osaka, Kansai, Japan
195	Shooto 2006: 5/28 in Kitazawa Town Hall	May 28, 2006	Kitazawa Town Hall	Setagaya, Tokyo, Japan
194	Shooto: Grapplingman 5	May 14, 2006		Hiroshima, Japan
193	Shooto: The Devilock	May 12, 2006	Korakuen Hall	Tokyo, Japan
192	G-Shooto: G-Shooto 05	May 6, 2006	Shinjuku Face	Tokyo, Japan
191	Shooto: 3/24 in Korakuen Hall	March 24, 2006	Korakuen Hall	Tokyo, Japan
190	G-Shooto: G-Shooto 04	March 11, 2006	Shinjuku Face	Tokyo, Japan
189	Shooto: 3/3 in Kitazawa Town Hall	March 3, 2006	Kitazawa Town Hall	Setagaya, Tokyo, Japan
188	Shooto: Gig Central 9	February 26, 2006	Zepp Nagoya	Nagoya, Aichi, Japan
187	G-Shooto: Plus05	February 24, 2006	Shin-Kiba 1st Ring	Tokyo, Japan
186	Shooto: The Victory of the Truth	February 17, 2006	Yoyogi National Gymnasium	Tokyo, Japan

== Shooto: The Victory of the Truth ==
Shooto: The Victory of the Truth was an event held on February 17, 2006 at Yoyogi National Gymnasium in Tokyo, Japan.

=== Results ===
Main Card
Weight class				Method	Round	Time	Notes
Lightweight	Tatsuya Kawajiri (c)	def.	Joachim Hansen	DQ (Kick to Groin)	1	0:08	(Note: For the Lightweight Championship.)
Welterweight	Shinya Aoki	def.	Akira Kikuchi (c)	Decision (Unanimous)	3	5:00	(Note: For the Welterweight Championship.)
	Mitsuhiro Ishida	def.	Kenichiro Togashi	Decision (Majority)	3	5:00
	Antonio Carvalho	def.	Rumina Sato	TKO (Punches)	2	0:49
	Takeshi Inoue	def.	Makoto Ishikawa	Decision (Unanimous)	3	5:00
	Tenkei Oda	def.	Hiroyuki Abe	Decision (Unanimous)	3	5:00
	Mizuto Hirota	def.	Danilo Cherman	Decision (Unanimous)	3	5:00
	Kenji Osawa	def.	Naoya Uematsu	Decision (Majority)	3	5:00
	Megumi Fujii	def.	Misaki Takimoto	Technical Submission (Armbar)	2	4:36

== G-Shooto: Plus05 ==
G-Shooto: Plus05 was an event held on February 24, 2006 at Shin-Kiba 1st Ring in Tokyo, Japan.

=== Results ===
Main Card
Weight class				Method	Round	Time	Notes
	Kayo Nagayasu	def.	Akiko Inoue	Decision (Unanimous)	2	5:00
	Maho Muranami	def.	Yukiko Seki	Submission (Armbar)	1	0:57
	Yoko Takahashi	def.	Mika Hayashi	TKO (Head Kick)	1	0:47
	Yoko Yamada	def.	Mayuko Kasaki	Submission (Guillotine Choke)	1	4:37
	Eri Kaneya	def.	Kanae Fukatsu	Submission (Armbar)	1	3:55

== Shooto: Gig Central 9 ==
Shooto: Gig Central 9 was an event held on February 26, 2006 at Zepp Nagoya in Nagoya, Aichi, Japan.

=== Results ===
Main Card
Weight class				Method	Round	Time	Notes
	Hatsu Hioki	vs.	Bao Quach	Draw	3	5:00
	Jin Kazeta	def.	Naoki Matsushita	TKO (Punches)	1	4:54
	Akira Kibe	vs.	Takahiro Hosoi	Draw	2	5:00
	Kabuto Kokage	vs.	Kenichi Hattori	Draw	2	5:00
	Takayuki Kanto	def.	Kenji Hosoya	Decision (Unanimous)	2	5:00
	Hiroshi Sakamoto	def.	Yosuke Ebihara	Decision (Unanimous)	2	5:00
	Hideru Inoue	def.	Kenya Kato	Decision (Unanimous)	2	5:00

== Shooto: 3/3 in Kitazawa Town Hall ==
Shooto: 3/3 in Kitazawa Town Hall was an event held on March 3, 2006 at Kitazawa Town Hall in Setagaya, Tokyo, Japan.

=== Results ===
Main Card
Weight class				Method	Round	Time	Notes
	Toshimichi Akagi	def.	Ayumu Shioda	Decision (Unanimous)	2	5:00
	Sakae Kasuya	vs.	Hiroshi Nakamura	Draw	2	5:00
	Yuki Shojo	def.	Ryuichi Miki	Decision (Unanimous)	2	5:00
	Yuji Inoue	def.	Daisuke Matsumoto	Decision (Unanimous)	2	5:00
	Akiyo Nishiura	def.	Tomonori Taniguchi	Decision (Majority)	2	5:00
	Daisuke Ishizawa	def.	Shintaro Ishiwatari	TKO (Cut)	2	2:01
	Takeshi Yamada	def.	Noboru Tahara	Decision (Unanimous)	2	5:00
	Taisuke Okuno	def.	Hidekazu Asakura	TKO (Punches)	2	3:20

== G-Shooto: G-Shooto 04 ==
G-Shooto: G-Shooto 04 was an event held on March 11, 2006 at Shinjuku Face in Tokyo, Japan.

=== Results ===
Main Card
Weight class				Method	Round	Time	Notes
	Marloes Coenen	def.	Yoko Takahashi	Submission (Armbar)	1	0:39
	Masako Yoshida	vs.	Misaki Takimoto	Draw	2	5:00
	Yasuko Tamada	vs.	Eri Kaneya	Draw	2	5:00
	Seri Saito	def.	Yoko Oyama	Decision (Unanimous)	2	5:00

== Shooto: 3/24 in Korakuen Hall ==
Shooto: 3/24 in Korakuen Hall was an event held on March 24, 2006 at Korakuen Hall in Tokyo, Japan.

=== Results ===
Main Card
Weight class				Method	Round	Time	Notes
Flyweight	Mamoru Yamaguchi (c)	vs.	Shinichi Kojima	Draw	3	5:00	(Note: For the Flyweight Championship.)
	Junji Ikoma	def.	Daiji Takahashi	Submission (Triangle Choke)	3	3:50
	Masatoshi Abe	def.	Homare Kuboyama	Decision (Unanimous)	3	5:00
	Ganjo Tentsuku	def.	Marius Liaukevicius	Decision (Majority)	2	5:00
	Fanjin Son	def.	Kyotaro Nakao	Decision (Unanimous)	2	5:00
	Yoshiyuki Yoshida	def.	Mindaugas Smirnovas	TKO (Punches)	1	4:00
	Seiji Ozuka	def.	Takamaro Watari	Decision (Unanimous)	2	5:00
	Mateus Irie Nechio	def.	Tomokazu Yuasa	Decision (Unanimous)	2	5:00

== G-Shooto: G-Shooto 05 ==
G-Shooto: G-Shooto 05 was an event held on May 6, 2006 at Shinjuku Face in Tokyo, Japan.

=== Results ===
Main Card
Weight class				Method	Round	Time	Notes
	Roxanne Modafferi	def.	Megumi Yabushita	Decision (Unanimous)	2	5:00
	Masako Yoshida	def.	Maho Muranami	Decision (Unanimous)	2	5:00
	Yasuko Tamada	vs.	Kayo Nagayasu	Draw	2	5:00
	Misaki Takimoto	vs.	Yuko Yamazaki	Draw	2	5:00
	Yoko Yamada	def.	Azusa Anzai	Submission (Armbar)	1	0:10

== Shooto: The Devilock ==
Shooto: The Devilock was an event held on May 12, 2006 at Korakuen Hall in Tokyo, Japan.

=== Results ===
Main Card
Weight class				Method	Round	Time	Notes
Featherweight	Takeshi Inoue	def.	Antonio Carvalho	TKO (Punches)	1	3:06	(Note: For the Featherweight Championship.)
	Mamoru Yamaguchi	def.	Setsu Iguchi	TKO (Doctor Stoppage)	1	2:45
	Kenji Kawaguchi	def.	Deividas Petrauskas	TKO (Punches)	1	2:05
	Mizuto Hirota	def.	Jin Kazeta	Decision (Unanimous)	3	5:00
	Tenkei Oda	def.	Akitoshi Tamura	KO (Punch)	1	2:10
	Hiroyuki Abe	def.	David Padilla	Submission (Armbar)	1	3:15
	Takeya Mizugaki	def.	Takamaro Watari	TKO (Punches)	1	3:49

== Shooto: Grapplingman 5 ==
Shooto: Grapplingman 5 was an event held on May 14, 2006 in Hiroshima, Japan.

=== Results ===
Main Card
Weight class				Method	Round	Time	Notes
	Tsuyoshi Okada	def.	Tetsuya Akihisa	Submission (Armbar)	1	3:35
	Keisuke Sakai	def.	Hirosumi Sugiura	Decision (Unanimous)	2	5:00
	Yoshifumi Dogaki	def.	Hirofumi Hara	Submission (Armbar)	1	1:13
	Shinji Sasaki	def.	Hiroshi Shiba	Decision (Majority)	2	5:00

== Shooto 2006: 5/28 in Kitazawa Town Hall ==
Shooto 2006: 5/28 in Kitazawa Town Hall was an event held on May 28, 2006 at Kitazawa Town Hall in Setagaya, Tokyo, Japan.

=== Results ===
Main Card
Weight class				Method	Round	Time	Notes
	Yusei Shimokawa	def.	Takeyasu Hirono	Decision (Unanimous)	2	5:00
	Yuki Shojo	def.	Mamoru Okochi	Decision (Unanimous)	2	5:00
	Hiroshi Nakamura	def.	Hirotaka Tomiyama	Submission (Armbar)	2	3:24
	Akihiro Yamazaki	def.	Takuya Sato	Submission (Rear Naked Choke)	1	1:26
	Yoshihiro Koyama	def.	Shinobu Miura	Decision (Majority)	2	5:00
	Atsushi Asano	def.	Satoshi Yamashita	TKO (Punches)	1	4:40
	Ayumu Shioda	def.	Hiroharu Matsufuji	Decision (Majority)	2	5:00

== Shooto: Gig West 5 ==
Shooto: Gig West 5 was an event held on June 3, 2006 at Azalea Taisho Hall in Osaka, Kansai, Japan.

=== Results ===
Main Card
Weight class				Method	Round	Time	Notes
	Koetsu Okazaki	def.	Hiroyuki Tanaka	Decision (Majority)	2	5:00
	Masashi Yozen	vs.	Jun Kitagawa	Draw	2	5:00
	Masaki Konishi	vs.	Toshihiko Sugimoto	Draw	2	5:00
	Masakatsu Ueda	def.	Nobuhiro Hayakawa	Decision (Unanimous)	2	5:00
	Hiroyuki Ikeda	vs.	Tomohiko Yoshida	Draw	2	5:00

== G-Shooto: G-Shooto 06 ==
G-Shooto: G-Shooto 06 was an event held on June 11, 2006 at Kitazawa Town Hall in Setagaya, Tokyo, Japan.

=== Results ===
Main Card
Weight class				Method	Round	Time	Notes
	Masako Yoshida	def.	Yasuko Tamada	Decision (Majority)	2	5:00
	Misaki Takimoto	def.	Maho Muranami	Submission (Armbar)	1	2:04
	Yuko Yamazaki	def.	Seri Saito	Decision (Majority)	2	5:00
	Eri Kaneya	def.	Yuka Okumura	Submission (Armbar)	1	1:29
	Mamiko Ishido	def.	Miyuki Ariga	Submission (Armbar)	1	4:21
	Wakako Sunayama	def.	Madoka Ebihara	TKO (Punches)	2	0:57

== Shooto 2006: 7/21 in Korakuen Hall ==
Shooto 2006: 7/21 in Korakuen Hall was an event held on July 21, 2006 at Korakuen Hall in Tokyo, Japan.

=== Results ===
Main Card
Weight class				Method	Round	Time	Notes
Bantamweight	Akitoshi Hokazono	def.	Kenji Osawa	Decision (Unanimous)	3	5:00	(Note: For the Bantamweight Championship.)
	Takeshi Inoue	def.	Cole Miller	Decision (Unanimous)	3	5:00
	Takeya Mizugaki	vs.	Ryota Matsune	Draw	3	5:00
	Masatoshi Abe	def.	Junji Ikoma	TKO (Eye Injury)	1	2:06
	So Tazawa	def.	Hiroyuki Tanaka	Decision (Unanimous)	3	5:00
	Yusuke Endo	def.	Clay Guida	Submission (Armbar)	1	2:47
	Daisuke Ishizawa	def.	Hiroshi Nakamura	KO (Punches)	2	4:26
	Teruyuki Matsumoto	def.	Kazuya Tamura	Submission (Rear Naked Choke)	1	1:55
	Takuya Mori	def.	Takayuki Kanto	Decision (Majority)	2	5:00
	Yoshihiro Koyama	def.	Yoshiki Noguchi	Decision (Unanimous)	2	5:00

== Shooto: Shooting Star ==
Shooto: Shooting Star was an event held on July 30, 2006 at Kitazawa Town Hall in Setagaya, Tokyo, Japan.

=== Results ===
Main Card
Weight class				Method	Round	Time	Notes
	Taisuke Okuno	def.	Mateus Irie Nechio	TKO (Punches)	2	1:01
	Tetsu Suzuki	def.	Takahiro Hosoi	Technical Submission (Leg Scissor Choke)	2	3:02
	Masaaki Sugawara	def.	Hayato Sato	Decision (Majority)	2	5:00
	Akiyo Nishiura	def.	Yuji Inoue	Decision (Unanimous)	2	5:00
	Yoshitaro Niimi	vs.	Akihiro Yamazaki	Draw	2	5:00
	Hideru Inoue	vs.	Ryuichi Miki	Draw	2	5:00
	Sakae Kasuya	def.	Tomonori Taniguchi	Decision (Unanimous)	2	5:00
	Joji Shimada	def.	Yosuke Ebihara	Decision (Unanimous)
	Seiji Furukawa	def.	Yoshinori Ashikawa	TKO (Punches)	2	1:54

== G-Shooto: Wrestle Expo 2006 ==
G-Shooto: Wrestle Expo 2006 was an event held on August 19, 2006 at Tokyo Waterfront Center in Tokyo, Japan.

=== Results ===
Main Card
Weight class				Method	Round	Time	Notes
	Mika Hayashi	def.	Kaoru Ito	Technical Submission (Armbar)	1	3:13
	Kia Stevens	def.	Rika Shimizu	TKO (Punches)	2	1:05
	Maho Muranami	def.	Yoko Yamada	Technical Submission (Armbar)	1	1:14
	Michiko Takeda	def.	Atsuko Emoto	Decision (Unanimous)	2	5:00
	Chie Ishii	def.	Miyuki Ariga	TKO (Punches)	1	4:38
	Mamiko Ishido	def.	Ayako Sato	Technical Submission (Armbar)	1	2:04
	Azusa Anzai	def.	Michi Nishijima	TKO (Punches)	1	2:20
	Sachiko Yamamoto	def.	Megumi Imagawa	Decision (Majority)	2	5:00

== Shooto 2006: 9/8 in Korakuen Hall ==
Shooto 2006: 9/8 in Korakuen Hall was an event held on September 8, 2006 at Korakuen Hall in Tokyo, Japan.

=== Results ===
Main Card
Weight class				Method	Round	Time	Notes
	Mamoru Yamaguchi	def.	Erikas Suslovas	TKO (Punches)	1	2:14
	Shiko Yamashita	def.	Grazhuydas Smailis	DQ (Grabbing the Ropes)	2	3:21
	Shinichi Kojima	def.	Yusei Shimokawa	Submission (Rear Naked Choke)	2	4:00
	Yasuhiro Urushitani	def.	Daiji Takahashi	Decision (Unanimous)	3	5:00
	Ganjo Tentsuku	def.	Kohei Yasumi	TKO (Punches)	1	2:46
	Akitoshi Tamura	def.	Sakae Kasuya	Submission (Armbar)	1	2:16
	Fanjin Son	def.	Eiji Murayama	Decision (Unanimous)	2	5:00
	Yuki Shojo	def.	Tsuyoshi Okada	Decision (Unanimous)	2	5:00
	Shinji Sasaki	def.	Michiyuki Ishibashi	Submission (Triangle Choke)	1	2:52
	Teruyuki Matsumoto	def.	Atsushi Asano	Decision (Unanimous)	2	5:00
	Mitsuhiro Takeda	def.	Seiji Furukawa	Submission (Kimura)	2	2:37

== Shooto: Gig Central 10 ==
Shooto: Gig Central 10 was an event held on September 17, 2006 at Zepp Nagoya in Nagoya, Aichi, Japan.

=== Results ===
Main Card
Weight class				Method	Round	Time	Notes
	Hiroshi Umemura	def.	Alexandre Shevtsov	TKO (Punches)	1	1:05
	Yasuhiro Akagi	def.	Takeyasu Hirono	Decision (Unanimous)	2	5:00
	Takahiro Kajita	def.	Yosuke Mikami	KO (Punch)	1	2:06
	Hisaki Hiraishi	def.	Kenichi Hattori	Decision (Split)	2	5:00
	Kenichi Sawada	def.	Tomohiko Yoshida	Decision (Unanimous)	2	5:00
	Takuya Mori	def.	Hiroshi Sakamoto	Decision (Majority)	2	5:00

== Shooto 2006: 10/1 in Kitazawa Town Hall ==
Shooto 2006: 10/1 in Kitazawa Town Hall was an event held on October 1, 2006 at Kitazawa Town Hall in Setagaya, Tokyo, Japan.

=== Results ===
Main Card
Weight class				Method	Round	Time	Notes
	Akihiro Murayama	vs.	Akihiko Adachi	Draw	2	5:00
	Masaaki Sugawara	def.	Takehiro Ishii	Decision (Unanimous)	2	5:00
	Ryuichi Miki	def.	Ayumu Shioda	Decision (Majority)	2	5:00
	Masakatsu Ueda	def.	Naoki Yahagi	TKO (Punches)	1	3:49
	Keisuke Yamada	vs.	Shintaro Ishiwatari	Draw	2	5:00
	Yuki Inoue	vs.	Masakazu Taguchi	Draw	2	5:00
	Shinya Murofushi	def.	Hiroyuki Ikeda	Submission (Armbar)	2	2:03
	Hiromasa Ougikubo	def.	Nobuhiro Hayakawa	Decision (Unanimous)	2	5:00

== Shooto: Champion Carnival ==
Shooto: Champion Carnival was an event held on October 14, 2006 at Pacifico Yokohama in Yokohama, Kanagawa, Japan.

=== Results ===
Main Card
Weight class				Method	Round	Time	Notes
	Tatsuya Kawajiri	def.	Per Eklund	TKO (Punches)	1	4:10
Flyweight	Shinichi Kojima	def.	Mamoru Yamaguchi (c)	Technical Submission (Rear-Naked Choke)	1	1:38	(Note: For the Flyweight Championship.)
	Shinya Aoki	def.	George Sotiropoulos	DQ (Groin Strike)	2	0:05
	Takeshi Inoue	def.	Navid Yousefi	Submission (Rear-Naked Choke)	2	4:35
	Akira Kikuchi	def.	Ronald Jhun	Submission (Armlock)	1	1:58
	Ryota Matsune	def.	David Lejenas	Submission (Rear-Naked Choke)	1	4:09
	Ganjo Tentsuku	vs.	Takashi Nakakura	Draw	3	5:00
	Akiyo Nishiura	def.	Daisuke Ishizawa	Decision (Unanimous)	2	5:00
	Masaki Konishi	def.	Yoshitaro Niimi	Decision (Unanimous)	2	5:00

== G-Shooto: Special 02 ==
G-Shooto: Special 02 was an event held on October 20, 2006 at Tokyo Kinema Club in Tokyo, Japan.

=== Results ===
Main Card
Weight class				Method	Round	Time	Notes
	Toshimichi Akagi	def.	Shinichi Hanawa	Decision (Unanimous)	2	5:00
	Kenichi Takeda	def.	Takahisa Toyoshima	Submission (Rear Naked Choke)	1	2:59
	Atsushi Asano	vs.	Kazuya Tamura	Draw	2	5:00
	Masako Yoshida	def.	Emi Tomimatsu	Submission (Armbar)	1	3:35
	Kanako Takeshita	def.	Mamiko Ishido	Submission (Armbar)	1	2:13

== Shooto: Gig West 6 ==
Shooto: Gig West 6 was an event held on November 4, 2006 at Azalea Taisho Hall in Osaka, Kansai, Japan.

=== Results ===
Main Card
Weight class				Method	Round	Time	Notes
	Koetsu Okazaki	def.	So Tazawa	Decision (Unanimous)	3	5:00
	Hiroyuki Tanaka	def.	Hiroshi Komatsu	Decision (Unanimous)	2	5:00
	Tomokazu Yuasa	def.	Keisuke Sakai	Decision (Unanimous)	2	5:00
	Yutaka Ueda	def.	Ken Omatsu	KO (Punch)	1	4:35
	Yuji Inoue	vs.	Tsutomu Shiiki	Draw	2	5:00
	Takuya Sato	vs.	Hirotoshi Konishi	Draw	2	5:00
	Junya Kodo	def.	Manabu Kano	Decision (Unanimous)	2	5:00

== Shooto: 11/10 in Korakuen Hall ==
Shooto: 11/10 in Korakuen Hall was an event held on November 10, 2006 at Korakuen Hall in Tokyo, Japan.

=== Results ===
Main Card
Weight class				Method	Round	Time	Notes
	Tenkei Oda	vs.	Katsuya Toida	Draw	3	5:00
	Kenji Osawa	def.	Takeya Mizugaki	TKO (Punches and Knees)	2	0:59
	Yasuhiro Urushitani	def.	Junji Ikoma	Decision (Unanimous)	3	5:00
	Yusuke Endo	def.	Jin Kazeta	Decision (Unanimous)	3	5:00
	Masaaki Sugawara	def.	Yuki Shojo	Decision (Majority)	2	5:00
	Yoshihiro Koyama	def.	Shinji Sasaki	Decision (Unanimous)	2	5:00
	Yuki Inoue	vs.	Toshikazu Iseno	Draw	2	5:00
	Keisuke Yamada	vs.	Hiroshi Nakamura	Draw	2	5:00
	Shintaro Ishiwatari	def.	Masatoshi Kobayashi	Decision (Majority)	2	5:00

== G-Shooto: G-Shooto Special03 ==
G-Shooto: G-Shooto Special03 was an event held on November 19, 2006 at Shin-Kiba 1st Ring in Tokyo, Japan.

=== Results ===
Main Card
Weight class				Method	Round	Time	Notes
	Mateus Irie Nechio	def.	Yoshitaro Niimi	Decision (Unanimous)	2	5:00
	Shinichi Hanawa	vs.	Yutaka Tetsuka	Draw	2	5:00
	Guy Delumeau	def.	Michiyuki Ishibashi	Submission (Straight Armbar)	2	2:15
	Eri Kaneya	def.	Taeko Nagamine	Submission (Armbar)	1	4:31
	Keiko Tamai	def.	Mamiko Ishido	Submission (Armbar)	1	1:10
	Nanako Yamaseki	def.	Harumi Harumi	Submission (Rear-Naked Choke)	2	4:13
	Sachiko Yamamoto	def.	Wakako Sunayama	Decision (Unanimous)	2	5:00

== Shooto: Gig Central 11 ==
Shooto: Gig Central 11 was an event held on November 26, 2006 at Zepp Nagoya in Nagoya, Aichi, Japan.

=== Results ===
Main Card
Weight class				Method	Round	Time	Notes
	Hatsu Hioki	def.	Byon Sho Kim	TKO (Doctor Stoppage)	1	1:32
	Yusei Shimokawa	def.	Yasuhiro Akagi	Decision (Unanimous)	3	5:00
	Takahiro Kajita	def.	Saburo Kawakatsu	TKO (Punches)	1	4:43
	Akira Kibe	def.	Takao Tamura	TKO (Punches)	1	4:32
	Tsuyoshi Okada	def.	Kenya Kato	Decision (Unanimous)	2	5:00
	Daisuke Matsumoto	def.	Kazuhiro Ito	Decision (Unanimous)	2	5:00

== Shooto: 11/30 in Kitazawa Town Hall ==
Shooto: 11/30 in Kitazawa Town Hall was an event held on November 30, 2006 at Kitazawa Town Hall in Setagaya, Tokyo, Japan.

=== Results ===
Main Card
Weight class				Method	Round	Time	Notes
	Hideki Kadowaki	def.	Daisuke Ishizawa	Decision (Unanimous)	2	5:00
	Ryuichi Miki	def.	Takuya Mori	Decision (Majority)	2	5:00
	Mamoru Okochi	def.	Hiroharu Matsufuji	TKO (Punches)	2	2:30
	Masato Fujiwara	def.	Shinobu Miura	Decision (Split)	2	5:00
	Ayumu Shioda	def.	Takeshi Sato	Decision (Unanimous)	2	5:00
	Katsuhisa Akasaki	def.	Kenji Hosoya	Decision (Unanimous)	2	5:00
	Noboru Tahara	def.	Kenichi Sawada	TKO (Corner Stoppage)	2	4:57
	Hiroyuki Abe	def.	Hiroyuki Ikeda	Submission (Rear Naked Choke)	2	3:56

== Shooto: Rookie Tournament Final ==
Shooto: Rookie Tournament Final was an event held on December 2, 2006 at Shinjuku Face in Tokyo, Japan.

=== Results ===
Main Card
Weight class				Method	Round	Time	Notes
	Akitoshi Tamura	def.	Akiyo Nishiura	Decision (Unanimous)	2	5:00
	Tetsu Suzuki	def.	Jin Akimoto	Decision (Unanimous)	2	5:00
	Masaki Konishi	def.	Taisuke Okuno	Decision (Unanimous)	2	5:00
	Masakatsu Ueda	def.	Teruyuki Matsumoto	Submission (Triangle Choke)	1	4:42
	Shinya Murofushi	def.	Hiroaki Takezawa	Submission (Armbar)	1	2:36
	Mitsuhiro Takeda	def.	Atsushi Matsuki	TKO (Punches)	2	3:16
	Takamaro Watari	def.	Nobuhiro Hayakawa	Decision (Unanimous)	2	5:00
	Katsuya Murofushi	def.	Hayato Sato	TKO (Doctor's Stoppage)	1	2:59

== See also ==
- List of Shooto champions
- List of Shooto Events
