= Dan Lauzon =

American mixed martial arts fighter

- Born: March 30, 1988 (age 38); Brockton, Massachusetts, U.S.
- Other names: The Upgrade
- Height: 5 ft 10 in (1.78 m)
- Weight: 170 lb (77 kg; 12 st)
- Division: Lightweight
- Reach: 72 in (183 cm)
- Style: BJJ, Submission Wrestling, Boxing, Pro Wrestling, Wrestling,
- Stance: Southpaw
- Fighting out of: East Bridgewater, Massachusetts, United States
- Team: Lauzon Martial Arts
- Years active: 2006–2015 (MMA)

Mixed martial arts record
- Total: 23
- Wins: 17
- By knockout: 9
- By submission: 7
- By decision: 1
- Losses: 6
- By knockout: 3
- By submission: 2
- By decision: 1

Other information
- Notable relatives: Joe Lauzon (brother)
- Mixed martial arts record from Sherdog

Daniel James Lauzon (born March 30, 1988) is an American former mixed martial artist who competed in the World Series of Fighting's Lightweight division, and has also formerly competed in the UFC and Affliction. He is the younger brother of fellow MMA fighter Joe Lauzon.

== Mixed martial arts career ==
=== Ultimate Fighting Championship ===
Lauzon began training at the age of 14. He made his Ultimate Fighting Championship (UFC) debut at UFC 64: Unstoppable, losing to Spencer Fisher. At 18 years, seven months and 14 days old, Lauzon was the second youngest fighter ever to appear in the UFC.

Lauzon is sponsored by TapouT and appeared in an episode of the television series TapouT. The TapouT crew followed Lauzon through the final preparations for his fight with Frank Latina. While filming, the crew expressed doubts about Lauzon's trainer and introduced him to crosstown rival trainer Mark DellaGrotte. After the episode aired, Lauzon's brother Joe criticized the episode and the TapouT crew's actions.

=== Affliction ===
Lauzon was originally scheduled to fight Chris Horodecki at the Affliction: Day of Reckoning event on January 24, but Chris was denied his license for failing his physical. Bobby Green stepped up to take Horodecki's spot against Lauzon. During the fight against Green, Lauzon claimed he was kicked and kneed to the groin a total of three times, a fact openly questioned by bloggers, internet forums and live by the broadcast team. Tito Ortiz was the color commentator for the event and, at one point, stated "Dan is faking". Referee Herb Dean and the ringside doctor asked Dan Lauzon if he wanted to continue to fight, and the fight was eventually restarted with Bobby Green having 2 points deducted. The crowd loudly booed the point deduction. While Bobby Green's unorthodox style managed to give Dan difficulties on the feet, Lauzon manage to control the fight on the ground and won due to a rear-naked choke with ten seconds left in the first round.

=== Return to Ultimate Fighting Championship ===
With the demise of the Affliction fight organization, Dan became a free agent and as of July 28, 2009, was under contract with the UFC.

Dan Lauzon faced Cole Miller on January 2, 2010 at UFC 108. In a back-and-forth fight, Miller locked a kimura from an inverted triangle position, earning himself a $50,000 Submission of the Night bonus. At the same event, Dan's brother, Joe Lauzon also lost his fight. After the event, Joe Lauzon said that a fight between them, or even at the same event, is "not an option anymore".

Two weeks before his scheduled fight in UFC 114, Dan Lauzon told the Boston Herald that his coaches and his brother Joe Lauzon would not "be there to support me." Reportedly unsatisfied with Lauzon's commitment to training, his coaches gave him an ultimatum requiring that he follow the schedule laid out for him, otherwise they would not corner him for his fight. Joe Lauzon claimed they had clearly outlined what was expected and his brother had fallen short. Escudero defeated Lauzon via unanimous decision.

In the aftermath off his loss at UFC 114, Lauzon was released from the promotion.

=== Post-UFC ===
After the loss, Lauzon was invited to train with Renzo Gracie and planned on taking Gracie up on his offer.

Lauzon made his first post-UFC fight against John Ortolani which he won via KO (punches) in the 2nd round. His next fight came exactly 2 months later against Damien Trites, which he won again by guillotine choke in the 1st round.

On February 17, 2011, Lauzon was stabbed outside a nightclub in Bridgewater, Massachusetts, sustaining non life-threatening injuries. According to Lauzon he did not reveal the identity of the attacker to the police.

On June 18, 2011, Lauzon returned to action fighting in the main event for World Championship Fighting against Noah Weisman for the Lightweight belt. Lauzon dominated the stand-up and won by KO in the 1st round to become the Lightweight Champion of World Championship Fighting.

On December 3, 2011, Lauzon defeated Anthony Kaponis via KO (punches) at 1:42 of round 1 in the main event of Premier FC 7. He has now won 5 straight fights since being released from the UFC, finishing 4 of his 5 opponents.

=== World Series of Fighting ===
Lauzon made his World Series of Fighting debut against UFC vet John Gunderson at WSOF 3 on June 14, 2013 headlined by former UFC vets Josh Burkman and Jon Fitch. He won the fight via unanimous decision. At that point, he was riding a five-fight win streak.

Lauzon faced undefeated prospect Justin Gaethje at WSOF 6. He lost the fight via TKO in the second round.

== Mixed martial arts record ==
Professional record breakdown
23 matches	17 wins	6 losses
By knockout	9	3
By submission	7	2
By decision	1	1

Res.	Record	Opponent	Method	Event	Date	Round	Time	Location	Notes
Loss	17–6	Chip Moraza-Pollard	TKO (head kick and punches)	CES MMA 30: Felix vs. Lane	August 14, 2015	2	3:12	Lincoln, Rhode Island, United States	
Loss	17–5	Justin Gaethje	KO (punches)	World Series of Fighting 6	October 26, 2013	2	1:40	Coral Gables, Florida, United States	
Win	17–4	John Gunderson	Decision (unanimous)	World Series of Fighting 3	June 14, 2013	3	5:00	Las Vegas, Nevada, United States	
Win	16–4	Anthony Kaponis	KO (punches)	Premier FC 7	December 3, 2011	1	1:42	Amherst, Massachusetts, United States	
Win	15–4	Noah Weisman	TKO (punches)	WCF 11	June 18, 2011	1	3:56	Wilmington, Massachusetts, United States	
Win	14–4	Damien Trites	Submission (guillotine choke)	CES: Snow Brawl	December 2, 2010	1	1:54	Lincoln, Rhode Island, United States	
Win	13–4	John Ortolani	TKO (punches)	Triumph Fighter 4: Hostile	October 2, 2010	2	2:22	Milford, New Hampshire, United States	
Loss	12–4	Efraín Escudero	Decision (unanimous)	UFC 114	May 29, 2010	3	5:00	Las Vegas, Nevada, United States	
Loss	12–3	Cole Miller	Submission (modified kimura)	UFC 108	January 2, 2010	1	3:05	Las Vegas, Nevada, United States	
Win	12–2	Bobby Green	Submission (rear-naked choke)	Affliction: Day of Reckoning	January 24, 2009	1	4:55	Anaheim, California, United States	
Win	11–2	Justin Hammertrum	TKO (punches)	World Championship Fighting 5	November 14, 2008	1	0:45	Wilmington, Massachusetts, United States	
Win	10–2	Brendan Hoxie	TKO (punches)	World Championship Fighting 4	June 20, 2008	2	3:45	Wilmington, Massachusetts, United States	
Win	9–2	Frank Latina	Submission (triangle choke)	World Championship Fighting 3	February 8, 2008	1	3:10	Wilmington, Massachusetts, United States	
Win	8–2	Andrew Montanez	TKO (punches)	Wild Bill's Fight Night 13	January 25, 2008	1	1:48	Atlanta, Georgia, United States	
Win	7–2	David George	TKO (punches)	Combat Zone 24	October 13, 2007	1	2:46	Revere, Massachusetts, United States	
Win	6–2	Wayne Harnois	KO (punches)	World Championship Fighting 1	September 21, 2007	1	0:14	Wilmington, Massachusetts, United States	
Win	5–2	James Meal	TKO (punches)	FFP Untamed 14	June 16, 2007	2	3:57	Plymouth, Massachusetts, United States	
Loss	4–2	Deividas Taurosevicius	Submission (rear-naked choke)	CFFC 3: Battleground	January 19, 2007	2	1:15	Atlantic City, New Jersey, United States	
Loss	4–1	Spencer Fisher	TKO (punches)	UFC 64: Unstoppable	October 14, 2006	1	4:38	Las Vegas, Nevada, United States	
Win	4–0	Dyrell Walker	Submission (triangle choke)	CZ 17: Take Control	August 5, 2006	1	3:52	Revere, Massachusetts, United States	
Win	3–0	Leonard Wilson	Submission (choke)	RITC 84: Celebrity Theatre	July 1, 2006	2	1:34	Phoenix, Arizona, United States	
Win	2–0	Jason Harris	Submission (choke)	RITC 83: Rampage	June 10, 2006	1	N/A	Scottsdale, Arizona, United States	
Win	1–0	Anthony Peters	Submission (toe hold)	WFL 6: Real - No Fooling Around	April 1, 2006	2	2:20	Revere, Massachusetts, United States	

== See also ==
- List of male mixed martial artists
