= Antonio Carvalho =

Canadian mixed martial artist

- Born: May 30, 1979 (age 47); Sault Ste. Marie, Ontario, Canada
- Other names: Pato
- Height: 5 ft 8 in (1.73 m)
- Weight: 145 lb (66 kg; 10.4 st)
- Division: Lightweight; Featherweight
- Reach: 70 in (178 cm)
- Stance: Orthodox
- Fighting out of: Oshawa, Ontario, Canada
- Team: Abe Ani Combat Club; Bruckmann Martial Arts; Franco Behring
- Rank: Black belt in Brazilian Jiu-Jitsu; Green belt in Judo; Black belt in Shotokan
- Years active: 2002-2013

Mixed martial arts record
- Total: 21
- Wins: 15
- By knockout: 7
- By submission: 3
- By decision: 5
- Losses: 6
- By knockout: 3
- By decision: 3

Other information
- Mixed martial arts record from Sherdog

Antonio Carvalho (born May 30, 1979) is a retired Canadian mixed martial artist. A professional from 2002 until 2013, he fought in the UFC and Shooto.

== Mixed martial arts career ==
=== Early career ===
Carvalho made his professional MMA debut in September 2002. Over the next ten years, he fought in his native Canada and in Japan. He amassed a record of 13 wins and 4 losses before joining the Ultimate Fighting Championship.

=== Ultimate Fighting Championship ===
In 2011, Antonio signed a multi-fight contract with the UFC and was expected to make his debut at UFC 134 against newcomer Yuri Alcantara. However an injury during training forced him out of his planned UFC debut.

Carvalho made his promotional debut against Felipe Arantes on January 14, 2012 at UFC 142, losing by unanimous decision.

Carvalho was expected to face George Roop on July 21, 2012 at UFC 149. However, Roop was forced out of the bout with an injury and replaced by Daniel Pineda. Carvalho defeated Pineda via KO in 71 seconds.

Carvalho next faced Rodrigo Damm on November 17, 2012 at UFC 154. He won the fight via split decision.

Carvalho then faced Darren Elkins on March 16, 2013 at UFC 158. Carvalho lost the fight via TKO (punches) in the first round and was subsequently released from the promotion.

=== World Series of Fighting ===
Carvalho will fight his first bout since leaving the UFC on February 12, 2015 at World Series of Fighting 18 in Edmonton, Alberta against Chris Gruetzemacher.

== Personal life ==
Carvalho is of Portuguese descent and speaks Portuguese fluently, having moved to Portugal from Canada at nine years old.

== Mixed martial arts record ==
Professional record breakdown
21 matches	15 wins	6 losses
By knockout	7	3
By submission	3	0
By decision	5	3

Res.	Record	Opponent	Method	Event	Date	Round	Time	Location	Notes
Loss	15–6	Darren Elkins	TKO (punches)	UFC 158	March 16, 2013	1	3:06	Montreal, Quebec, Canada	
Win	15–5	Rodrigo Damm	Decision (split)	UFC 154	November 17, 2012	3	5:00	Montreal, Quebec, Canada	
Win	14–5	Daniel Pineda	KO (punches)	UFC 149	July 21, 2012	1	1:11	Calgary, Alberta, Canada	
Loss	13–5	Felipe Arantes	Decision (unanimous)	UFC 142	January 14, 2012	3	5:00	Rio de Janeiro, Brazil	
Win	13–4	Doug Evans	Decision (unanimous)	Score Fighting Series	June 10, 2011	3	5:00	Mississauga, Ontario, Canada	
Win	12–4	Juan Barrantes	KO (punch)	Warrior-1 MMA: Judgement Day	June 19, 2010	1	2:00	Laval, Quebec, Canada	
Win	11–4	Eddie Fyvie	Decision (unanimous)	Warrior-1 MMA: Bad Blood	March 20, 2010	3	5:00	Montreal, Quebec, Canada	
Loss	10–4	Yuji Hoshino	Decision (unanimous)	Cage Force	June 22, 2008	3	5:00	Tokyo, Japan	Featherweight debut.
Loss	10–3	Hiroyuki Takaya	TKO (knees and punches)	Shooto: Back To Our Roots 6	November 8, 2007	3	1:58	Tokyo, Japan	Catchweight (148 lbs) bout.
Win	10–2	Hatsu Hioki	Decision (split)	Shooto: Back To Our Roots 3	May 18, 2007	3	5:00	Tokyo, Japan	
Loss	9–2	Takeshi Inoue	TKO (punches)	Shooto: The Devilock	May 12, 2006	1	3:06	Tokyo, Japan	For the Shooto Lightweight Championship.
Win	9–1	Rumina Sato	TKO (punches)	Shooto: The Victory of the Truth	February 17, 2006	2	0:49	Tokyo, Japan	
Loss	8–1	Jeff Curran	Decision (majority)	Ironheart Crown	November 29, 2005	3	5:00	Hammond, Indiana, United States	
Win	8–0	Takeshi Inoue	Decision (majority)	Shooto: Alive Road	August 20, 2005	3	5:00	Kanagawa Prefecture, Japan	
Win	7–0	Tommy Lee	Submission (triangle choke)	WFF 8: Dominance	March 26, 2005	1	2:02	Vancouver, British Columbia, Canada	
Win	6–0	Christian Allen	TKO (punches)	IHC 7: The Crucible	June 5, 2004	2	3:55	Hammond, Indiana, United States	
Win	5–0	John Louro	Submission (bulldog choke)	World Freestyle Fighting 6	May 14, 2004	1	2:45	Vancouver, British Columbia, Canada	
Win	4–0	Eric Davidson	TKO (punch)	Ultimate Generation Combat 7	March 6, 2004	1	0:45	Montreal, Quebec, Canada	
Win	3–0	Phillipe Lagace	TKO (punches)	TKO Major League MMA	September 6, 2003	2	3:10	Montreal, Quebec, Canada	
Win	2–0	Brian Geraghty	TKO (punches)	Freestyle Combat Challenge 10	March 22, 2003	2	0:35	Racine, Wisconsin, United States	
Win	1–0	Luke Boutin	Submission (triangle choke)	Maximum Fighting Championship	September 21, 2002	1	1:29	Calgary, Alberta, Canada	
