= UFC 108 =

UFC mixed martial arts event in 2009

UFC 108: Evans vs. Silva
- The poster for UFC 108: Evans vs. Silva
- Promotion: Ultimate Fighting Championship
- Date: January 2, 2010
- Venue: MGM Grand Garden Arena
- City: Las Vegas, Nevada
- Attendance: 13,529
- Total gate: $1,969,670
- Buyrate: 300,000

Event chronology
UFC 107: Penn vs Sanchez	UFC 108: Evans vs. Silva	UFC Fight Night: Maynard vs. Diaz

UFC 108: Evans vs. Silva was a mixed martial arts event held by the Ultimate Fighting Championship on January 2, 2010, in Las Vegas, Nevada, at the MGM Grand Garden Arena.

== Background ==
The card for UFC 108 was plagued with numerous injuries, with multiple potential fights being called off as a result.

A proposed main event featured UFC Middleweight Champion Anderson Silva facing off against former UFC Light Heavyweight Champion Vitor Belfort. However, it was announced by Silva's manager, Ed Soares, that the fight would not happen at UFC 108 because Silva would not be fully healed from elbow surgery.

A bout between Brock Lesnar and Shane Carwin for the UFC Heavyweight Championship was rescheduled from UFC 106 to UFC 108, but this fight did not take place due to a continuing medical condition suffered by Lesnar.

The winner of a bout between Antônio Rodrigo Nogueira and Cain Velasquez was to be guaranteed a title shot for the UFC Heavyweight Championship against the eventual winner of the Lesnar vs. Carwin bout. The planned bout was later scrapped when Nogueira was forced to pull out of the fight due to a severe case of staph infection. A possible Velasquez vs. Carwin match for an interim belt had been ruled out as a new main event due to Carwin undergoing knee surgery, although there were talks of the fight possibly happening at a later date. The Nogueira/Velasquez bout was scheduled for February 21, 2010 at UFC 110, though it was not for the interim belt.

Gabriel Gonzaga was forced to pull out of his bout with Junior dos Santos on November 25, due to illness. Gonzaga was replaced by Gilbert Yvel.

Paul Daley was scheduled to face Carlos Condit, but on December 9, it was announced that Condit had pulled out due to injury. Condit was replaced by Dustin Hazelett.

On December 11, Tyson Griffin pulled out of his bout with Jim Miller, citing an injury. Sean Sherk, who originally had a fight with Rafaello Oliveira, stepped up as Griffin's replacement. However, on December 17, Sherk pulled out of the fight; Duane Ludwig would eventually replace Sherk.

Martin Kampmann vs. Rory Markham was also called off days later due to a knee injury. On December 14 it was announced that Jacob Volkmann would be replacing Markham. Volkmann came off short rest after last fighting at UFC 106.

On December 29, it was announced that Steve Cantwell had pulled out of his scheduled bout with Vladimir Matyushenko. Since there was no time to find a suitable replacement to face Matyushenko, the bout was called off.

== Results ==
Main card
Weight class				Method	Round	Time	Notes
Light Heavyweight	Rashad Evans	def.	Thiago Silva	Decision (unanimous) (29–28, 29–28, 29–28)	3	5:00
Catchweight (172 lb)	Paul Daley	def.	Dustin Hazelett	KO (punches)	1	2:24
Lightweight	Sam Stout	def.	Joe Lauzon	Decision (unanimous) (30–26, 30–27, 30–27)	3	5:00
Lightweight	Jim Miller	def.	Duane Ludwig	Submission (armbar)	1	2:31
Heavyweight	Junior dos Santos	def.	Gilbert Yvel	TKO (punches)	1	2:07
Televised (Spike TV)
Welterweight	Martin Kampmann	def.	Jacob Volkmann	Submission (ninja choke)	1	4:03	(Note: This bout aired on the PPV broadcast following the Lauzon vs. Stout fight.)
Lightweight	Cole Miller	def.	Dan Lauzon	Submission (reverse triangle and kimura)	1	3:05	(Note: This bout aired on the PPV broadcast following the Miller vs. Ludwig fight.)
Preliminary card
Middleweight	Mark Muñoz	def.	Ryan Jensen	TKO (Submission to punches)	1	2:30	(Note: This bout aired on the Spike broadcast following the Kampmann vs. Volkmann fight. This bout also aired on the PPV broadcast following the Hazelett vs. Daley fight.)
Welterweight	Jake Ellenberger	def.	Mike Pyle	TKO (punches)	2	0:22	(Note: This bout aired on the Spike broadcast following the Miller vs. Lauzon fight. This bout also aired last on the PPV broadcast following the Evans vs. Silva fight.)
Lightweight	Rafaello Oliveira	def.	John Gunderson	Decision (unanimous) (30–27, 30–27, 30–27)	3	5:00

== Bonus awards ==
The following fighters received $50,000 bonuses.

- Fight of the Night: Joe Lauzon vs. Sam Stout
- Knockout of the Night: Paul Daley
- Submission of the Night: Cole Miller

== Reported payout ==
The following is the reported payout to the fighters as reported to the Nevada State Athletic Commission. It does not include sponsor money or "locker room" bonuses often given by the UFC and also do not include the UFC's traditional "fight night" bonuses.

- Rashad Evans: $375,000 (includes $175,000 win bonus) def. Thiago Silva: $55,000
- Paul Daley: $34,200 ($18,000 win bonus) def. Dustin Hazelett: $19,800 ^
- Sam Stout: $24,000 ($12,000 win bonus) def. Joe Lauzon: $12,000
- Jim Miller: $30,000 ($15,000 win bonus) def. Duane Ludwig: $12,000
- Junior dos Santos: $60,000 ($30,000 win bonus) def. Gilbert Yvel: $30,000
- Martin Kampmann: $46,000 ($23,000 win bonus) def. Jacob Volkmann: $6,000
- Cole Miller: $24,000 ($12,000 win bonus) def. Dan Lauzon: $15,000
- Mark Munoz: $32,000 ($16,000 win bonus) def. Ryan Jensen: $6,000
- Jake Ellenberger: $20,000 ($10,000 win bonus) def. Mike Pyle: $16,000
- Rafaello Oliveira: $20,000 ($10,000 win bonus) def. John Gunderson: $8,000

^ Paul Daley was fined 10 percent of his "show" money for failing to make the 170-pound welterweight limit; the $1,800 was awarded to Dustin Hazelett.

== See also ==
- Ultimate Fighting Championship
- List of UFC champions
- List of UFC events
- 2010 in UFC
