= Takeshi Inoue (mixed martial artist) =

Japanese mixed martial artist

Takeshi Inoue リオン武
- Born: March 18, 1980 (age 46); Yokohama, Kanagawa, Japan
- Other names: Lion
- Nationality: Japanese
- Height: 5 ft 8 in (1.73 m)
- Weight: 145.7 lb (66.1 kg; 10.41 st)
- Division: Featherweight; Bantamweight
- Stance: Orthodox
- Fighting out of: Yokohama, Kanagawa, Japan
- Team: Shooting Gym Yokohama
- Rank: 2nd dan black belt in Judo
- Years active: 2003-present

Kickboxing record
- Total: 2
- Wins: 1
- Losses: 1

Mixed martial arts record
- Total: 37
- Wins: 24
- By knockout: 11
- By submission: 4
- By decision: 9
- Losses: 13
- By knockout: 1
- By submission: 1
- By decision: 11

Other information
- Boxing record from BoxRec
- Mixed martial arts record from Sherdog

Takeshi Inoue (Japanese: 井上 武, Inoue Takeshi; born March 18, 1980) is a Japanese mixed martial artist currently competing in the Featherweight division of Shooto. A professional MMA competitor since 2003, he has also competed for DREAM, and Vale Tudo Japan.

== Biography ==
On May 12, 2006, Inoue defeated Antonio Carvalho by TKO in the first round to become the Shooto World Lightweight (143 lbs.) champion which he would go on to lose in his first title defense against Akitoshi Tamura on May 18, 2007. On November 8, 2007, he defeated Katsuya Toida to become the Pacific Rim Lightweight Champion.

Inoue would eventually win back the Shooto World Championon November 29, 2008 after defeating Hideki Kadowaki by unanimous decision at Shooto's Tradition 4 show. He successfully defended his title against Rumina Sato, before losing it to Hatsu Hioki at Shooto – The Way of Shooto 3: Like a Tiger, Like a Dragon.

== Championships and accomplishments ==
- MMA Fighting
  - 2006 Featherweight Fighter of the Year
- Shooto
  - Shooto Lightweight Championship (Two times)
  - One Successful Title Defense
  - Shooto Pacific Rim Lightweight Championship (One time)
  - 2004 Shooto Lightweight Rookie Tournament Winner

== Mixed martial arts record ==
Professional record breakdown
37 matches	24 wins	13 losses
By knockout	11	1
By submission	4	1
By decision	9	11

Res.	Record	Opponent	Method	Event	Date	Round	Time	Location	Notes
Win	1–0	Hayate Usui	Decision (unanimous)	Shooto: Shooter's Dream 2	May 30, 2003	2	5:00	Tokyo, Japan	
Win	2–0	Masanori Sugatani	TKO (cut)	Shooto: Who is Young Leader!	October 31, 2003	1	3:04	Tokyo, Japan	
Win	3–0	Yohei Suzuki	TKO (punches)	Shooto: 3/22 in Korakuen Hall	March 22, 2004	1	2:40	Tokyo, Japan	
Win	4–0	Keisuke Yamada	Decision (unanimous)	Shooto: 7/16 in Korakuen Hall	July 16, 2004	2	5:00	Tokyo, Japan	
Win	5–0	Hayate Usui	KO (punch)	Shooto: Wanna Shooto 2004	November 12, 2004	2	4:58	Tokyo, Japan	
Win	6–0	Jin Kazeta	Submission (rear-naked choke)	Shooto: 3/11 in Korakuen Hall	March 11, 2005	2	4:17	Tokyo, Japan	
Loss	6–1	Antonio Carvalho	Decision (majority)	Shooto: Alive Road	August 20, 2005	3	5:00	Yokohama, Japan	
Win	7–1	Akitoshi Tamura	Decision (majority)	Shooto 2005: 11/6 in Korakuen Hall	November 6, 2005	2	5:00	Tokyo, Japan	
Win	8–1	Makoto Ishikawa	Decision (unanimous)	Shooto: The Victory of the Truth	February 17, 2006	3	5:00	Tokyo, Japan	
Win	9–1	Antonio Carvalho	TKO (punches)	Shooto: The Devilock	May 12, 2006	1	3:06	Tokyo, Japan	Won Shooto Lightweight (143 lbs) Championship.
Win	10–1	Cole Miller	Decision (unanimous)	Shooto 2006: 7/21 in Korakuen Hall	July 21, 2006	3	5:00	Tokyo, Japan	
Win	11–1	Navid Yousefi	Submission (rear-naked choke)	Shooto: Champion Carnival	October 14, 2006	2	4:35	Yokohama, Japan	
Win	12–1	Hiroyuki Abe	KO (punch)	Shooto: Back To Our Roots 1	February 17, 2007	1	4:05	Yokohama, Japan	
Loss	12–2	Akitoshi Tamura	Decision (unanimous)	Shooto: Back To Our Roots 3	May 18, 2007	3	5:00	Tokyo, Japan	Lost Shooto Lightweight (143 lbs) Championship.
Win	13–2	Marc Duncan	Submission (rear-naked choke)	Shooto: Back To Our Roots 4	July 15, 2007	1	3:16	Tokyo, Japan	
Win	14–2	Katsuya Toida	Decision (unanimous)	Shooto: Back To Our Roots 6	November 8, 2007	3	5:00	Tokyo, Japan	Won Shooto Pacific Rim Lightweight Championship.
Loss	14–3	Savant Young	Decision (unanimous)	Shooto: Shooto Tradition 1	May 3, 2008	2	5:00	Tokyo, Japan	
Win	15–3	Hideki Kadowaki	Decision (unanimous)	Shooto: Shooto Tradition 4	November 29, 2008	3	5:00	Tokyo, Japan	Won Shooto Lightweight (143 lbs) Championship.
Win	16–3	Rumina Sato	TKO (punches)	Shooto: Shooto Tradition Final	May 10, 2009	1	4:41	Tokyo, Japan	Defended Shooto Lightweight (143 lbs) Championship.
Win	17–3	Alexandre Franca Nogueira	TKO (punches)	Vale Tudo Japan 2009	October 30, 2009	4	2:58	Tokyo, Japan	
Win	18–3	Gerald Lovato	Submission (armbar)	Shooto: The Way of Shooto 1: Like a Tiger, Like a Dragon	January 23, 2010	3	4:11	Tokyo, Japan	
Loss	18–4	Hatsu Hioki	Decision (split)	Shooto: The Way of Shooto 3: Like a Tiger, Like a Dragon	May 30, 2010	3	5:00	Tokyo, Japan	Lost Shooto Lightweight (143 lbs) Championship.
Loss	18–5	Kazuyuki Miyata	Decision (unanimous)	DREAM 16	September 25, 2010	2	5:00	Nagoya, Japan	
Win	19–5	Taiki Tsuchiya	TKO (punches)	Shooto: Shooto Tradition 2011	April 29, 2011	2	4:27	Tokyo, Japan	
Win	20–5	Koichiro Matsumoto	TKO (punches)	DREAM: Fight for Japan!	May 29, 2011	1	6:51	Saitama, Japan	
Win	21–5	Caol Uno	KO (head kick)	DREAM 17	September 24, 2011	1	4:17	Saitama, Japan	
Loss	21–6	Hiroyuki Takaya	Decision (unanimous)	Fight For Japan: Genki Desu Ka Omisoka 2011	December 31, 2011	5	5:00	Tokyo, Japan, Japan	For DREAM Featherweight Championship.
Loss	21–7	Kenji Osawa	Decision (unanimous)	Vale Tudo Japan: VTJ 1st	December 24, 2012	3	5:00	Tokyo, Japan	Bantamweight debut.
Loss	21–8	Yusuke Yachi	Decision (unanimous)	Vale Tudo Japan: VTJ 3rd	October 5, 2013	3	5:00	Tokyo, Japan	Return to Featherweight.
Loss	21–9	Rob Lisita	Submission (bulldog choke)	Rebel Fighting Championship 1: Into the Lion's Den	December 21, 2013	2	3:19	Kallang, Singapore	
Loss	21–10	Isao Kobayashi	Decision (unanimous)	Vale Tudo Japan: VTJ 6th	October 4, 2014	3	5:00	Tokyo, Japan	
Win	22–10	Fumiya Sasaki	Decision (unanimous)	Mobstyles 15th Anniversary: Fight & Mosh	May 3, 2015	3	5:00	Tokyo, Japan	
Win	23–10	Yojiro Uchimura	TKO (punches)	Vale Tudo Japan - VTJ 8th	September 19, 2016	2	4:17	Urayasu, Chiba, Japan	
Loss	23–11	Yutaka Saito	Decision (unanimous)	Shooto - Professional Shooto 5/13	May 13, 2018	3	5:00	Kawasaki, Kanagawa, Japan	
Win	24–11	Mitsuhiro Toma	Decision (unanimous)	Shooto - Professional Shooto 9/23	September 23, 2018	3	5:00	Tokyo, Japan	
Loss	24–12	Mikuru Asakura	TKO (flying knee and punches)	Rizin - Heisei's Last Yarennoka!	December 31, 2018	2	2:39	Saitama, Japan	
Loss	24–13	Duane van Helvoirt	Decision (unanimous)	Shooto 30th Anniversary Tour 6th Round	July 15, 2019	3	5:00	Tokyo, Japan	
Win	25-13	Taison Naito	KO (Punches)	Shooto : MOBSTYLES presents FIGHT&MOSH	December 2, 2023	2	2:31	Tokyo, Japan	

== Kickboxing record ==
Kickboxing record
1 win (0 KOs), 0 losses
Date	Result	Opponent	Event	Location	Method	Round	Time	Record
November 6, 2011	Win	(Japan) Hiroki Shishido	Shooto the Shoot 2011	Tokyo, Japan	Decision (majority)	3	3:00	1-0
Legend: Win Loss Draw/No contest
