= Jason Reinhardt =

American mixed martial arts fighter

- Born: October 31, 1969 (age 56); Decatur, Illinois, United States
- Height: 5 ft 6 in (1.68 m)
- Weight: 135 lb (61 kg; 9 st 9 lb)
- Division: Lightweight; Featherweight; Bantamweight
- Reach: 64.0 in (163 cm)
- Stance: Orthodox
- Fighting out of: Las Vegas, Nevada, United States
- Team: Wand Fight Team
- Rank: Brown belt in Brazilian Jiu-Jitsu
- Years active: 2000-2011

Mixed martial arts record
- Total: 23
- Wins: 20
- By knockout: 6
- By submission: 14
- Losses: 3
- By knockout: 1
- By submission: 2

Other information
- Mixed martial arts record from Sherdog

Jason Reinhardt (born October 31, 1969) is an American mixed martial artist. A professional MMA competitor from 2000 to 2011, Reinhardt fought in the UFC and King of the Cage.

== Mixed martial arts career ==
=== Early career ===
After compiling a 1-0 amateur record, Reinhardt won the SFC Submission Fighting Championships professional bantamweight title on 11/3/2000 defeating Arizona fighter Ray Duke. He went on the following year to win the RSF Reality Submission Fighting Championships professional bantamweight title defeating WEC veteran Del Hawkins on 3/30/2001. He would have fights in many American organizations before fighting for King of the Cage in Calgary Alberta, Canada in 2005. From there Reinhardt faced Japanese star Hideo Tokoro in the main event of ZST 9 in Tokyo, Japan. This fight was changed to a grappling only match after Tokoro signed a contract the week prior to ZST 9, to face Royce Gracie in K-1: Premium 2005 Dynamite.

=== Ultimate Fighting Championship ===
Reinhardt made his UFC debut against submission specialist Joe Lauzon at UFC 78. He lost the fight via submission due to a rear naked choke in the first round.

=== Return to UFC ===
After a two-year layoff due to injury Reinhardt made his return to the UFC at UFC 127 in Australia facing Tiequan Zhang being defeated by guillotine choke at 0:48 of round 1.

Reinhardt faced Edwin Figueroa on August 14, 2011, at UFC on Versus 5. He lost the fight via TKO in the second round.

Following his loss to Figueroa, Reinhardt was released from the promotion.

== Other media ==
Reinhardt also appeared in the documentary The Man in the Arena about fellow MMA fighter.

== Mixed martial arts record ==
Professional record breakdown
23 matches	20 wins	3 losses
By knockout	6	1
By submission	14	2

Res.	Record	Opponent	Method	Event	Date	Round	Time	Location	Notes
Loss	20–3	Edwin Figueroa	TKO (elbows and punches)	UFC Live: Hardy vs. Lytle	August 14, 2011	2	0:50	Milwaukee, Wisconsin, United States	Bantamweight bout.
Loss	20–2	Zhang Tiequan	Submission (guillotine choke)	UFC 127	February 27, 2011	1	0:48	Sydney, Australia	Featherweight bout.
Win	20–1	Cody Larson	Submission (armbar)	Iowa Challenge 46	December 1, 2008	1	1:37	Iowa, United States	
Win	19–1	Marcus Hermann	TKO (submission to punches)	Revolution Cage Fighting 10	December 8, 2007	1	1:55	Quincy, Illinois, United States	
Loss	18–1	Joe Lauzon	Submission (rear-naked choke)	UFC 78	November 17, 2007	1	1:14	Newark, New Jersey, United States	Lightweight bout.
Win	18–0	Theodore Reynol	TKO	Courage Fighting Championships 8	April 21, 2007	1	2:00	Decatur, Illinois, United States	
Win	17–0	Jorge Conger	Submission (armbar)	Legends of Fighting 8	July 28, 2006	2	0:57	Indianapolis, Indiana, United States	
Win	16–0	Ed Meyers	TKO (submission to punches)	Courage Fighting Championships 5	April 29, 2006	1	1:59	Decatur, Illinois, United States	
Win	15–0	Mike Lindquist	Submission (rear-naked choke)	KOTC: Redemption on the River	February 17, 2006	1	2:14	Moline, Illinois, United States	
Win	14–0	Joe Santiago	Submission (armbar)	KOTC: Firestorm	September 24, 2005	1	4:30	Calgary, Alberta, Canada	
Win	13–0	Brad Cottrell	TKO (punches)	KOTC: Xtreme Edge	September 17, 2005	1	1:37	Indianapolis, Indiana, United States	
Win	12–0	Tom Logsdon	Submission (rear-naked choke)	Courage Fighting Championships 2	March 26, 2005	1	1:42	Decatur, Illinois, United States	
Win	11–0	Mike Lindquist	Submission (armbar)	Iowa Fighting Organization	September 17, 2004	1	0:36	Davenport, Iowa, United States	
Win	10–0	Trent Bibbs	Submission (armbar)	Iowa Fighting Organization	September 10, 2004	N/A	N/A	Davenport, Iowa, United States	
Win	9–0	Josh Delaney	TKO (submission to punches)	Extreme Challenge 55	December 5, 2003	1	1:16	Lakemoor, Illinois, United States	
Win	8–0	Ryan Sotter	Submission (triangle choke)	Ultimate Submission Challenge	July 7, 2001	1	3:28	Bethalto, Illinois, United States	
Win	7–0	Ben Carlson	Submission (rear naked choke)	Extreme Challenge 40	June 16, 2001	1	1:36	Springfield, Illinois, United States	Featherweight bout.
Win	6–0	Del Hawkins	Submission (armbar)	Reality Submission Fighting 3	March 30, 2001	1	1:20	Belleville, Illinois, United States	Won the RSF Bantamweight Championship.
Win	5–0	Ray Duke	Submission (armbar)	Submission Fighting Championships 12	November 3, 2000	1	N/A	Collinsville, Illinois, United States	Won the SFC Bantamweight Championship.
Win	4–0	Zack Welker	Submission (triangle choke)	SC 2: Gladiators	September 8, 2000	2	0:42	Illinois, United States	
Win	3–0	Charlie Hutchison	KO	SC 1: The Awakening	July 1, 2000	1	0:00	Canton, Illinois, United States	
Win	2–0	Scott March	Submission (armbar)	GMAP	March 11, 2000	1	3:11	Springfield, Illinois, United States	
Win	1–0	Sean Yoshida	Submission (guillotine choke)	Submission Fighting Championships 9	January 28, 2000	1	0:32	Belleville, Illinois, United States	

== See also ==
- List of male mixed martial artists
- List of Brazilian jiu-jitsu practitioners
