= Nevada Lions =

MMA team

The Nevada Lions were an International Fight League team based in Reno, Nevada, in the United States. Coached by UFC and MMA legend Ken Shamrock the Lions were one of four teams established at the beginning of the 2007 season.

== Record/Roster ==
The Lions were 8–7 as of June 2007 in team competition. All records are IFL fights only

^{a}= alternate bout that does not go towards team record

^{GP}= fought during the individual GP, does not go towards team record

=== Past Fighters ===
- John Gunderson (2–2) (LW)

def Josh Odom by submission (triangle choke) in the first round (01/19/07)

lost to Bart Palaszewski by decision (split) (04/07/07)

def Gabe Casillas by submission (rear naked choke) in the second round (06/16/07)

lost to Wagney Fabiano by submission (guillotine choke) in the second round (11/03/07)^{GP}

- Joe Martin (0–1) (LW) ALTERNATE

lost to Clint Coronel by TKO (strikes) in the second round (01/19/07)

- Pat Healy (2–1) (WW)

def Ray Steinbeiss by decision (unanimous) (01/19/07)

lost to Rory Markham by TKO in the third round (04/07/07)

def Mike Guymon by decision (split) (06/16/07)

- Daniel Molina (1–2) (MW)

lost to Brian Foster by TKO (strikes) in the second round (01/19/07)

lost to Ryan McGivern by decision (unanimous) (04/07/07)

def Seth Baczynski by submission (heelhook) in the first round (06/16/07)

- Rick Reeves (2–0) (MW) ALTERNATE

def Luke Johnson by submission in the first round (04/07/07)^{a}

def Christopher Kennedy by decision (unanimous) (06/16/07)^{a}

- Vernon White (1–1) (LHW)

originally White was supposed to face San Jose Razor Claws member Raphael Davis on 1/19/07 but due to a California state commission ruling the fight was called off because of the large disparity in experience between White (who has over 50 MMA fights) and Davis (who only has 2). In place of the LHW battle, the two alternate LWs of the teams will face off instead.

def Sam Hoger by submission (rear naked choke) in the second round (04/07/07)

lost to Mike Whitehead by TKO (strikes) in the second round (06/16/07)

=== IFL Heavyweight Champion ===
- Roy Nelson (4–1) (HW)

def Vince Lucero by TKO (strikes) in the first round (01/19/07)

lost to Ben Rothwell by decision (split) (04/07/07)

def Shane Ott by decision (unanimous) (06/16/07)

def Bryan Vetell by TKO (strikes) in the third round (11/03/07)^{GP}

def Antoine Jaoude by TKO (strikes) in the second round to win the Heavyweight title (12/29/07)^{GP}

== 2007 Season Schedule/ Results ==
Date	Opponent	Result
January 19, 2007	San Jose Razorclaws	W 3-2
April 07, 2007	Quad City Silverbacks	L 1-4
June 16, 2007	Tucson Scorpions	W 4-1
