= Edwin Figueroa =

American mixed martial arts fighter

- Born: July 31, 1984 (age 42); McKinney, Texas, United States
- Other names: El Feroz
- Height: 5 ft 7 in (1.70 m)
- Weight: 135 lb (61 kg; 9 st 9 lb)
- Division: Bantamweight
- Reach: 69.0 in (175 cm)
- Fighting out of: McKinney, Texas, United States
- Team: Mohler MMA
- Years active: 2007–present

Mixed martial arts record
- Total: 13
- Wins: 9
- By knockout: 6
- By submission: 2
- By decision: 1
- Losses: 4
- By knockout: 1
- By decision: 3

Other information
- Website: Official website
- Mixed martial arts record from Sherdog

Edwin Richard Figueroa (born July 31, 1984) is an American mixed martial artist who most recently competed in the bantamweight division of the UFC. A professional MMA competitor since 2007, Figueroa fought in regional promotions in his home state of Texas before signing with Zuffa in 2011.

== MMA career ==
=== Background ===
Figueroa started training in boxing at the age of 6, turned to kickboxing at 14, and turned professional mixed martial artist in 2007.

=== Ultimate Fighting Championship ===
Figueroa made his promotional debut against highly touted prospect Michael McDonald on March 26, 2011, at UFC Fight Night 24, replacing an injured Nick Pace on less than two weeks notice. The fight was highly entertaining with both fighters exchanging strikes and submission attempts throughout the entire fight and earned Fight of the Night honors. Figueroa lost the fight via unanimous decision (30-27, 30–27, 30–27).

Figueroa fought Jason Reinhardt on August 14, 2011, at UFC on Versus 5. He won the fight via TKO in the second round.

Figueroa next faced Alex Caceres on February 4, 2012, at UFC 143. He won the fight via split decision after Caceres was docked two points by referee Herb Dean in the second round for repeated illegal groin kicks.

Figueroa was expected to face Ken Stone on June 22, 2012, at UFC on FX 4. However, Figueroa was forced out of the bout with an injury and replaced by Francisco Rivera.

Figueroa next fought Francisco Rivera on February 2, 2013, at UFC 156. Figueroa was finished for the first time in his career when Rivera won via TKO late in the second round.

Figueroa faced Roland Delorme on June 15, 2013, at UFC 161. He lost the exciting back-and-forth fight via unanimous decision.

Figueroa next faced Erik Pérez at UFC 167. He lost the fight via unanimous decision and was subsequently released from promotion.

Figueroa returned to MMA after nearly three years off and faced Levi Mowles at LFC 56 at The Bomb Factory in Dallas on June 24, 2016. He lost by unanimous decision.

== Championships and accomplishments ==
- Ultimate Fighting Championship
  - Fight of the Night (One time) vs. Michael McDonald

== Mixed martial arts record ==
Professional record breakdown
14 matches	9 wins	5 losses
By knockout	6	1
By submission	2	0
By decision	1	4

Res.	Record	Opponent	Method	Event	Date	Round	Time	Location	Notes
Loss	9–5	Levi Mowles	Decision (unanimous)	LFC 56	June 24, 2016	3	5:00	Dallas, Texas, United States	
Loss	9–4	Erik Pérez	Decision (unanimous)	UFC 167	November 16, 2013	3	5:00	Las Vegas, Nevada, United States	
Loss	9–3	Roland Delorme	Decision (unanimous)	UFC 161	June 15, 2013	3	5:00	Winnipeg, Manitoba, Canada	
Loss	9–2	Francisco Rivera	TKO (punches)	UFC 156	February 2, 2013	2	4:20	Las Vegas, Nevada, United States	
Win	9–1	Alex Caceres	Decision (split)	UFC 143	February 4, 2012	3	5:00	Las Vegas, Nevada, United States	Caceres was penalized two points for kicks to the groin.
Win	8–1	Jason Reinhardt	TKO (elbows and punches)	UFC Live: Hardy vs. Lytle	August 14, 2011	2	0:50	Milwaukee, Wisconsin, United States	
Loss	7–1	Michael McDonald	Decision (unanimous)	UFC Fight Night: Nogueira vs. Davis	March 26, 2011	3	5:00	Seattle, Washington, United States	Fight of the Night.
Win	7–0	Johnny Bedford	TKO (punches)	KOK 9: Resurrection	August 20, 2010	2	0:17	Austin, Texas, United States	
Win	6–0	Warren Stewart	TKO (punches)	SWC 11: Fury	June 19, 2010	2	1:06	Frisco, Texas, United States	
Win	5–0	Navied Sadeghi	Submission (choke)	Art of War: Mano A Mano	July 12, 2009	1	2:09	Mesquite, Texas, United States	
Win	4–0	Aaron Suarez	KO (punch)	KOK 5: Season's Beatings	November 22, 2008	1	1:56	Austin, Texas, United States	
Win	3–0	Christian Sanchez	TKO (punches)	King of Kombat 4	July 26, 2008	1	0:24	Austin, Texas, United States	
Win	2–0	Matt Yount	TKO (punches)	Xtreme Fighting Championships 9	June 22, 2007	2	1:30	Beaumont, Texas, United States	
Win	1–0	Whitney Brown	Submission (rear-naked choke)	Art of War 2	May 11, 2007	2	1:03	Austin, Texas, United States	
