= John Gunderson =

American mixed martial arts fighter

- Born: May 1, 1980 (age 46); Houston, Texas, U.S.
- Other names: Guns
- Height: 5 ft 9 in (1.75 m)
- Weight: 155 lb (70 kg; 11.1 st)
- Division: Lightweight; Welterweight
- Reach: 69 in (180 cm)
- Fighting out of: Houston, Texas, U.S.
- Team: Team Tompkins
- Years active: 2001–2014

Mixed martial arts record
- Total: 53
- Wins: 35
- By knockout: 4
- By submission: 28
- By decision: 3
- Losses: 16
- By knockout: 2
- By submission: 6
- By decision: 8
- Draws: 2

Other information
- Mixed martial arts record from Sherdog

John Gunderson (born May 1, 1980) is an American former mixed martial artist who used to fight with the UFC. He was once a top-ten lightweight outside the UFC. Gunderson is also an International Fight League veteran who fought out of Ken Shamrock's Lion's Den and was a member of the Nevada Lions alongside The Ultimate Fighter: Heavyweights winner Roy Nelson. He is currently training with Xtreme Couture and TapouT.

== Mixed martial arts career ==
=== Ultimate Fighting Championship ===
Gunderson made his UFC debut at UFC 108 against Rafaello Oliveira with 12 days notice on January 2, 2010. He lost the fight via unanimous decision.

Gunderson was supposed to make his next appearance against Paul Taylor at UFC 112, but the fight was canceled last minute due to Taylor not being medically cleared.

Gunderson was scheduled to face Taylor at The Ultimate Fighter: Team Liddell vs. Team Ortiz Finale, but Taylor was forced out of the bout again. Gunderson fought and defeated UFC newcomer and Canadian kickboxing champ Mark Holst.

Gunderson was expected to face Efraín Escudero on September 15, 2010 at UFC Fight Night 22, however Escudero fought Matt Wiman as Mac Danzig was pulled from the card due to injury. Gunderson instead faced returning UFC veteran and former number 2 world ranked lightweight Yves Edwards, and lost the fight via unanimous decision. He was later released from UFC.

=== World Series of Fighting ===
Gunderson made his World Series of Fighting debut on June 14, 2013, against UFC vet Dan Lauzon at WSOF 3. He lost the fight via unanimous decision. He then faced Chris Gruetzmacher at WSOF 9 on March 29, 2014. Gunderson lost the fight via unanimous decision.

SCC After winning his promotional debut with a fight of the night Gunderson Faced Team Alpha Male standout and coach Justin Buchholz. Being a 3-1 underdog Gunderson battered Buchholz with strong hooks and take downs eventually winning by Kimura in the 3rd round.

=== Other promotions ===
Gunderson faced Jeff Fletcher at Rage in the Cage 172 on June 7, 2014. He won the fight via guillotine choke, snapping his three-fight losing streak in the process.

=== Bellator and retirement ===
Gunderson was expected to face Alexander Sarnavskiy on October 10, 2014 at Bellator 128. However, Gunderson pulled out of the bout and then retired from mixed martial arts competition. His reasons for retirement was due to a "lack of drive to compete" and a "desire to move into other ventures." Gunderson retired with a record of 35–16–2.

Gunderson retired with over 13 different titles in smaller MMA promotions.

== Personal life ==
John and his fiancee, Kristin Stewart, have two daughters.

== Championships and accomplishments ==
- ShoFIGHT
  - ShoFIGHT Welterweight Championship (One time)
- Superior Cage Combat
  - SCC Lightweight Championship (One time)

== Mixed martial arts record ==
Professional record breakdown
| 53 matches | 35 wins | 16 losses |
| By knockout | 4 | 2 |
| By submission | 28 | 6 |
| By decision | 3 | 8 |
| Draws | 2 | |

| Res. | Record | Opponent | Method | Event | Date | Round | Time | Location | Notes |
|---|---|---|---|---|---|---|---|---|---|
| Win | 35–16–2 | Jeff Fletcher | Submission (guillotine choke) | RITC: Rage in the Cage 172 | June 7, 2014 | 3 | 2:26 | Phoenix, Arizona, United States | |
| Loss | 34–16–2 | Chris Gruetzemacher | Decision (unanimous) | World Series of Fighting 9: Carl vs. Palhares | March 29, 2014 | 3 | 5:00 | Paradise, Nevada, United States | |
| Loss | 34–15–2 | Dan Lauzon | Decision (unanimous) | World Series of Fighting 3 | June 14, 2013 | 3 | 5:00 | Las Vegas, Nevada, United States | |
| Loss | 34–14–2 | David Castillo | Submission (rear-naked choke) | Caged Combat 6: Day of the Warrior | July 14, 2012 | 4 | 3:30 | Grand Ronde, Oregon, United States | For the Cage Combat Welterweight Championship. |
| Win | 34–13–2 | Karo Parisyan | Submission (guillotine choke) | ShoFIGHT MMA 20 | June 16, 2012 | 1 | 2:47 | O'Reilly Family Event Center, Springfield, Missouri, United States | Won vacant ShoFIGHT Welterweight Championship |
| Win | 33–13–2 | Justin Buchholz | Submission (kimura) | Superior Cage Combat 4 | February 16, 2012 | 3 | 2:34 | Las Vegas, Nevada, United States | Won SCC Lightweight Championship |
| Loss | 32–13–2 | Niko Puhakka | Decision (split) | Fight Festival 31 | October 1, 2011 | 3 | 5:00 | Helsinki, Finland | |
| Win | 32–12–2 | James Birdsley | Submission (rear-naked choke) | Superior Cage Combat 2 | August 20, 2011 | 2 | 2:06 | Las Vegas, Nevada, United States | Catchweight (160 lb) bout |
| Loss | 31–12–2 | Dominique Robinson | TKO referee stoppage due to exhaustion | TPF 8: All or Nothing | February 18, 2011 | 3 | 0:41 | Lemoore, California, United States | |
| Win | 31–11–2 | Alejandro Solano Rodriguez | Submission (kimura) | XVT 5 - Franca vs. Kheder | December 19, 2010 | 1 | 1:34 | Cartago, Costa Rica | |
| Loss | 30–11–2 | Yves Edwards | Decision (unanimous) | UFC Fight Night: Marquardt vs. Palhares | September 15, 2010 | 3 | 5:00 | Austin, Texas, United States | |
| Win | 30–10–2 | Mark Holst | Decision (unanimous) | The Ultimate Fighter 11 Finale | June 19, 2010 | 3 | 5:00 | Las Vegas, Nevada, United States | |
| Loss | 29–10–2 | Rafaello Oliveira | Decision (unanimous) | UFC 108 | January 2, 2010 | 3 | 5:00 | Las Vegas, Nevada, United States | |
| Win | 29–9–2 | Steve Sharp | Submission (kimura) | MMA Xplosion - Gunderson vs. Sharp | October 10, 2009 | 3 | 3:17 | Las Vegas, Nevada, United States | |
| Win | 28–9–2 | Fabian Acuna | Submission (kimura) | ROF 35 - Summer Brawl | August 1, 2009 | 1 | 2:18 | Broomfield, Colorado, United States | |
| Win | 27–9–2 | Dan Russom | Submission (Peruvian necktie) | DB 37 - Desert Brawl 37 | June 27, 2009 | 1 | 2:10 | Bend, Oregon, United States | |
| Loss | 26–9–2 | Bryan Travers | Decision (unanimous) | PFC 13: Validation | May 8, 2009 | 3 | 3:00 | Lemoore, California, United States | |
| Win | 26–8–2 | Eric Regan | Submission (kimura) | RITC 125 - Rage in the Cage 125 | April 17, 2009 | 2 | 0:55 | Phoenix, Arizona, United States | |
| Win | 25–8–2 | Alexander Crispim | Decision (split) | PFC 12: High Stakes | January 22, 2009 | 3 | 3:00 | Lemoore, California, United States | |
| Loss | 24–8–2 | Ryan Schultz | Decision (split) | IFL - Las Vegas | February 29, 2008 | 3 | 5:00 | Las Vegas, Nevada, United States | For the IFL Lightweight Championship. |
| Loss | 24–7–2 | Wagnney Fabiano | Submission (guillotine choke) | IFL - World Grand Prix Semifinals | November 3, 2007 | 2 | 1:53 | Chicago, Illinois, United States | |
| Win | 24–6–2 | Gabriel Casillas | Submission (rear-naked choke) | IFL - Las Vegas | June 16, 2007 | 2 | 2:58 | Las Vegas, Nevada, United States | |
| Loss | 23–6–2 | Bart Palaszewski | Decision (split) | IFL - Moline | April 7, 2007 | 3 | 4:00 | Moline, Illinois, United States | |
| Win | 23–5–2 | Josh Odom | Submission (triangle choke) | IFL - Oakland | January 17, 2007 | 1 | 3:05 | Oakland, California, United States | |
| Win | 22–5–2 | Bryan Caraway | Submission (armbar) | DB 19 - Oregon vs Texas | September 23, 2006 | 2 | 4:10 | Bend, Oregon, United States | |
| Win | 21–5–2 | Mike Joy | KO (Knee) | DB 17 - DesertBrawl 17 | April 1, 2006 | 1 | 1:09 | Bend, Oregon, United States | |
| Win | 20–5–2 | Cam Ward | Decision (unanimous) | SF 14 - Resolution | January 6, 2006 | 3 | 5:00 | Portland, Oregon, United States | |
| Win | 19–5–2 | Danny Payne | Submission (Kimura) | DB 15 - DesertBrawl 15 | October 15, 2005 | 1 | 0:28 | Bend, Oregon, United States | |
| Win | 18–5–2 | Rudy Garcia | Submission (rear-naked choke) | UCF - Night of Champions | August 27, 2005 | N/A | N/A | Medford, Oregon, United States | |
| Win | 17–5–2 | Charles Bennett | TKO | GC 40 - Gladiator Challenge 40 | August 13, 2005 | 2 | 1:28 | Bend, Oregon, United States | |
| Win | 16–5–2 | Shawn Bias | Submission (triangle arm bar) | DB 14 - DesertBrawl 14 | July 23, 2005 | 1 | N/A | Bend, Oregon, United States | |
| Loss | 15–5–2 | Frank Watts | Technical Submission (guillotine choke) | XFC - Dome of Destruction 2 | April 30, 2005 | 1 | 0:47 | Tacoma, Washington, United States | |
| Win | 15–4–2 | Enoch Wilson | Submission (rear-naked choke) | SF 9 - Respect | March 26, 2005 | 1 | 3:06 | Gresham, Oregon, United States | |
| Win | 14–4–2 | Armando Valadez | Submission (rear-naked choke) | RITR 10 - Rumble in the Ring 10 | December 11, 2004 | 1 | 1:36 | Auburn, Washington, United States | |
| Loss | 13–4–2 | Donny Raines | Submission (armbar) | DB 12 - DesertBrawl 12 | November 20, 2004 | 1 | N/A | Bend, Oregon, United States | |
| Win | 13–3–2 | Dave Rivas | KO (Punches and Knees) | DB 11 - DesertBrawl 11 | July 17, 2004 | 3 | N/A | Bend, Oregon, United States | |
| Win | 12–3–2 | Mike Jonet | Submission (rear-naked choke) | PFA - Pride and Fury | June 3, 2004 | 1 | 0:27 | Worley, Idaho, United States | |
| Draw | 11–3–2 | Rob Hisamoto | Draw | FCFF - Fight Night 4 | May 15, 2004 | 2 | 5:00 | Medford, Oregon, United States | |
| Win | 11–3–1 | Rob Hisamoto | KO (punches and knees) | DB 10 - DesertBrawl 10 | April 3, 2004 | 3 | 0:45 | Bend, Oregon, United States | |
| Win | 10–3–1 | Brad Horner | Submission (armbar) | SF 2 - On the Move | March 19, 2004 | 1 | 1:15 | Portland, Oregon, United States | |
| Win | 9–3–1 | Dean Lavin | TKO | FCFF - Rumble at the Roseland 11 | January 24, 2004 | 1 | 3:02 | Portland, Oregon, United States | |
| Win | 8–3–1 | Chris Young | Submission (armbar) | DB 9 - DesertBrawl 9 | November 8, 2003 | 1 | 4:17 | Bend, Oregon, United States | |
| Loss | 7–3–1 | Chris Irvine | Submission (armbar) | URC 6 - Ultimate Ring Challenge 6 | October 25, 2003 | 2 | 1:15 | Longview, Washington, United States | |
| Win | 7–2–1 | Pedro Castaneda | Submission (triangle choke) | TQP - Sport Fight "Devastation" | October 11, 2003 | 1 | 1:10 | Oregon City, Oregon, United States | |
| Win | 6–2–1 | Shawn Cahill | Submission | FCFF - Rumble at the Roseland 9 | July 12, 2003 | 2 | 3:55 | Portland, Oregon, United States | |
| Loss | 5–2–1 | Chad Nelson | TKO (punches) | Rumble at the Roseland 8 | June 7, 2003 | 1 | 1:44 | Portland, Oregon, United States | |
| Win | 5–1–1 | Vince Guzman | Submission (armbar) | DB 7 - Battle in Bend | May 17, 2003 | 1 | 1:40 | Bend, Oregon, United States | |
| Win | 4–1–1 | Dominic Rivera | TKO (punches) | FCFF - Rumble at the Roseland 7 | April 19, 2003 | N/A | N/A | Portland, Oregon, United States | |
| Draw | 3–1–1 | Armando Valadez | Draw | XRW - Xtreme Ring Wars 1 | March 15, 2003 | 3 | 3:00 | Wenatchee, Washington, United States | |
| Win | 3–1 | Lin Tru | TKO (punches) | PPKA - Rock 'N' Rumble | February 22, 2003 | 1 | 1:20 | Olympia, Washington, United States | |
| Win | 2–1 | Brock Mclure | TKO (punches and knees) | SO - Showdown in the Octagon | January 25, 2003 | N/A | N/A | Boise, Idaho, United States | |
| Loss | 1–1 | Charlie Fortec | Submission (guillotine choke) | DB 6 - DesertBrawl 6 | January 11, 2003 | 1 | 1:27 | Redmond, Oregon, United States | |
| Win | 1–0 | Al Libey | TKO (punches) | DB 5 - DesertBrawl 5 | August 17, 2002 | 1 | N/A | Bend, Oregon, United States | |
