= Hatsu Hioki =

Japanese mixed martial artist

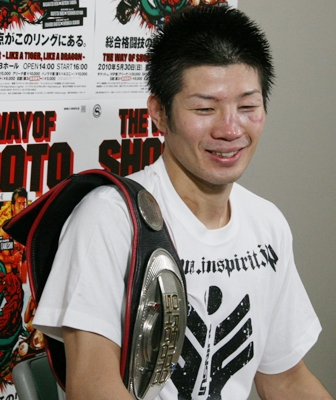
- Born: Hioki Hatsu; July 18, 1983 (age 43); Nagoya, Aichi, Japan
- Native name: 日沖 発
- Other names: Shooto no Ko (Child of Shooto), Iron Broom
- Height: 5 ft 11 in (1.80 m)
- Weight: 145 lb (66 kg; 10.4 st)
- Division: Featherweight
- Reach: 73 in (185 cm)
- Style: MMA, Shooto, Brazilian jiu-jitsu
- Stance: Orthodox
- Fighting out of: Nagoya, Aichi, Japan
- Team: ALIVE Shooto & Jiu-Jitsu Academy; Tristar Gym
- Rank: Black belt in Brazilian Jiu-Jitsu
- Years active: 2009–present

Mixed martial arts record
- Total: 44
- Wins: 30
- By knockout: 4
- By submission: 13
- By decision: 13
- Losses: 12
- By knockout: 4
- By submission: 1
- By decision: 7
- Draws: 2

Other information
- Mixed martial arts record from Sherdog

Hatsu Hioki (Japanese: 日沖発, Hioki Hatsu) (Japanese pronunciation: [çioki hatsɯ], born July 18, 1983) is a Japanese former professional mixed martial artist competing in the featherweight division. He is the former Shooto Lightweight Champion, Sengoku Featherweight Champion, and TKO Featherweight Champion. Hioki is a long time Shooto veteran and has fought most of his fights in Japanese promotions including the largest mixed martial arts organization at the time, Pride Fighting Championships.

== Mixed martial arts career ==
=== TKO Major League MMA ===
Hioki won his first MMA title in the Canadian promotion TKO Major League MMA, by defeating Mark Hominick for the featherweight belt. Prior to this Hioki had only one loss to Hiroyuki Takaya in Shooto and had a record of 8-1-1. He successfully defended this title twice before participating in the Sengoku Featherweight Grand Prix tournament.

=== Sengoku Featherweight Grand Prix ===
Hioki defeated Masanori Kanehara in the semi-final of the tournament but was unable to continue on to the final to fight Michihiro Omigawa due to an injury in his bout with Kanehara. Kanehara replaced Hioki for the final and ended up winning the tournament.

=== Shooto Featherweight Championship ===
On May 30, 2010 Hioki fought Takeshi Inoue for the Shooto Featherweight Championship (143 lbs) and won by a split decision making him the 9th fighter to win it and the 8th Japanese fighter to do so. Hioki had a controversially lost to Antonio Carvalho during his Shooto career.

=== Sengoku Featherweight Championship ===
After defeating Jeff Lawson at Sengoku Raiden Championships 14, Hioki received a title shot against then WVR: Sengoku Featherweight Champion Marlon Sandro. The Championship fight was held at World Victory Road Presents: Soul of Fight on December 30, 2010. Hioki defeated Sandro via unanimous decision. Hioki's superior reach and movement allowed him to out land and counter the aggressive Brazilian. Hioki became the third featherweight Champion for Sengoku.

Hioki vacated the title on June 25, 2011 after signing with the UFC.

=== Ultimate Fighting Championship ===
On the same date he vacated the Sengoku Featherweight Championship: June 25, 2011, UFC officials announced that Hioki had signed a multi fight deal with the UFC. He debuted at UFC 137 on October 29, 2011, where he defeated George Roop via split decision.

Hioki faced veteran Bart Palaszewski on February 26, 2012 at UFC 144, winning the bout via unanimous decision. Hioki dominated the whole fight taking down Bart Palaszewski several times and applying a variety of submission attempts.

Hioki was offered a title shot but turned it down and instead faced Ricardo Lamas on June 22, 2012 at UFC on FX: Maynard vs. Guida. He lost the fight via unanimous decision.

Hioki faced Clay Guida on January 26, 2013 at UFC on Fox: Johnson vs. Dodson. Despite landing more strikes than Guida, and consistently looking for submissions after being taken to the ground, Guida was awarded the split decision.

Hioki faced Darren Elkins on August 28, 2013 at UFC Fight Night 27. He lost the fight via unanimous decision.

Hioki faced Ivan Menjivar on March 1, 2014 at UFC Fight Night: Kim vs. Hathaway. He won the fight via unanimous decision.

Hioki faced Charles Oliveira on June 28, 2014 at UFC Fight Night 43. He lost the fight via submission, with the loss being the first time Hioki has ever been finished in MMA.

Hioki faced Dan Hooker on May 10, 2015 at UFC Fight Night 65. He lost the fight by knockout in the second round, marking his first loss by TKO/KO. Subsequently, he was released from the promotion.

== Championships and accomplishments ==
=== Mixed martial arts ===
- Sengoku Raiden Championships
  - Sengoku Featherweight Championship (One time)
  - 2009 Sengoku Featherweight GP Semifinalist
- Professional Shooto Japan
  - Shooto Featherweight Championship (One time)
- TKO Major League MMA
  - TKO Featherweight Championship (One time; last)
  - Two successful title defenses

== Mixed martial arts record ==
Professional record breakdown
44 matches	30 wins	12 losses
By knockout	4	4
By submission	13	1
By decision	13	7
Draws	2	

Res.	Record	Opponent	Method	Event	Date	Round	Time	Location	Notes
Win	30–12–2	Alexandre Franca Nogueira	Decision (unanimous)	Roots of Martial Arts Network 2	April 27, 2025	1	15:00	Tokyo, Japan	Lightweight debut.
Loss	29–12–2	Mikuru Asakura	TKO (head kick and punches)	Rizin 12	August 12, 2018	1	3:45	Nagoya, Japan	
Loss	29–11–2	Hiroyuki Takaya	KO (punches)	Pancrase 290	October 8, 2017	1	1:12	Tokyo, Japan	
Loss	29–10–2	Hiroshige Tanaka	KO (punch)	Pancrase 287	May 28, 2017	1	0:14	Tokyo, Japan	
Win	29–9–2	Yojiro Uchimura	Decision (unanimous)	Pancrase 278	June 12, 2016	3	5:00	Tokyo, Japan	
Win	28–9–2	Kyosuke Yokoyama	Submission (rear-naked choke)	Pancrase 275	January 31, 2016	1	1:35	Tokyo, Japan	
Loss	27–9–2	Dan Hooker	KO (head kick and punches)	UFC Fight Night: Miocic vs. Hunt	May 10, 2015	2	4:13	Adelaide, Australia	
Loss	27–8–2	Charles Oliveira	Submission (anaconda choke)	UFC Fight Night: Te Huna vs. Marquardt	June 28, 2014	2	4:28	Auckland, New Zealand	
Win	27–7–2	Ivan Menjivar	Decision (unanimous)	The Ultimate Fighter China Finale: Kim vs. Hathaway	March 1, 2014	3	5:00	Macau, SAR, China	
Loss	26–7–2	Darren Elkins	Decision (unanimous)	UFC Fight Night: Condit vs. Kampmann 2	August 28, 2013	3	5:00	Indianapolis, Indiana, United States	
Loss	26–6–2	Clay Guida	Decision (split)	UFC on Fox: Johnson vs. Dodson	January 26, 2013	3	5:00	Chicago, Illinois, United States	
Loss	26–5–2	Ricardo Lamas	Decision (unanimous)	UFC on FX: Maynard vs. Guida	June 22, 2012	3	5:00	Atlantic City, New Jersey, United States	
Win	26–4–2	Bart Palaszewski	Decision (unanimous)	UFC 144	February 26, 2012	3	5:00	Saitama, Japan	
Win	25–4–2	George Roop	Decision (split)	UFC 137	October 29, 2011	3	5:00	Las Vegas, Nevada, United States	
Win	24–4–2	Donald Sanchez	Submission (triangle choke)	Shooto: Tradition 2011	April 29, 2011	2	1:36	Tokyo, Japan	
Win	23–4–2	Marlon Sandro	Decision (unanimous)	World Victory Road Presents: Soul of Fight	December 30, 2010	5	5:00	Tokyo, Japan	Won the Sengoku Featherweight Championship.
Win	22–4–2	Jeff Lawson	Submission (triangle choke)	World Victory Road Presents: Sengoku 14	August 22, 2010	1	2:09	Tokyo, Japan	
Win	21–4–2	Takeshi Inoue	Decision (split)	Shooto: The Way of Shooto 3	May 30, 2010	3	5:00	Tokyo, Japan	Won the Shooto Featherweight Championship.
Loss	20–4–2	Michihiro Omigawa	Decision (split)	World Victory Road Presents: Sengoku 11	November 7, 2009	3	5:00	Tokyo, Japan	
Win	20–3–2	Masanori Kanehara	Decision (unanimous)	World Victory Road Presents: Sengoku 9	August 2, 2009	3	5:00	Saitama, Japan	2009 Sengoku Featherweight Grand Prix Semifinal.
Win	19–3–2	Ronnie Mann	Submission (triangle choke)	World Victory Road Presents: Sengoku 8	May 2, 2009	1	3:09	Tokyo, Japan	2009 Sengoku Featherweight Grand Prix Quarterfinal.
Win	18–3–2	Chris Manuel	Submission (triangle armbar)	World Victory Road Presents: Sengoku 7	March 20, 2009	1	4:12	Tokyo, Japan	2009 Sengoku Featherweight Grand Prix Round of 16.
Win	17–3–2	Rumina Sato	TKO (punches)	Shooto: Tradition 4	November 29, 2008	1	3:32	Tokyo, Japan	
Win	16–3–2	Thierry Quenneville	Submission (triangle choke)	TKO 35	October 3, 2008	1	4:14	Montreal, Quebec, Canada	Defended TKO Featherweight Championship.
Draw	15–3–2	Hiroshi Nakamura	Draw (majority)	Shooto: Gig Central 15	August 3, 2008	3	5:00	Aichi, Japan	
Win	15–3–1	Baret Yoshida	TKO (punches)	Shooto: Back To Our Roots 8	March 28, 2008	1	4:51	Tokyo, Japan	
Win	14–3–1	Katsuya Toida	Submission (armbar)	Shooto: Back To Our Roots 7	January 26, 2008	2	4:30	Tokyo, Japan	
Win	13–3–1	Brian Geraghty	Decision (unanimous)	HEAT 5	November 25, 2007	3	5:00	Aichi, Japan	
Loss	12–3–1	Kim Jong-man	Decision (split)	Shooto: Gig Central 13	October 8, 2007	3	5:00	Aichi, Japan	
Loss	12–2–1	Antonio Carvalho	Decision (split)	Shooto: Back To Our Roots 3	May 18, 2007	3	5:00	Tokyo, Japan	
Win	12–1–1	Mark Hominick	Decision (majority)	TKO 28	February 9, 2007	5	5:00	Montreal, Quebec, Canada	Defended the TKO Featherweight Championship.
Win	11–1–1	Kim Byon-sho	TKO (doctor stoppage)	Shooto: Gig Central 11	November 26, 2006	1	1:32	Aichi, Japan	
Win	10–1–1	Jeff Curran	Decision (unanimous)	Pride Bushido 12	August 26, 2006	2	5:00	Aichi, Japan	
Win	9–1–1	Mark Hominick	Technical Submission (triangle choke)	TKO 25	May 5, 2006	2	5:00	Montreal, Quebec, Canada	Won the TKO Featherweight Championship.
Draw	8–1–1	Bao Quach	Draw (split)	Shooto: Gig Central 9	February 26, 2006	3	5:00	Aichi, Japan	
Win	8–1	Tom Niinimäki	Technical Submission (armbar)	Shooto 2005: 11/6 in Korakuen Hall	November 6, 2005	1	3:03	Tokyo, Japan	
Win	7–1	Hideki Kadowaki	Submission (armbar)	Shooto: Gig Central 8	July 3, 2005	2	3:34	Nagoya, Japan	
Win	6–1	Joe Pearson	Submission (punches)	Shooto: Gig Central 7	March 27, 2005	1	1:35	Nagoya, Japan	
Win	5–1	Tsutomu Shiiki	Decision (unanimous)	Shooto: Gig Central 6	September 12, 2004	2	5:00	Nagoya, Japan	
Win	4–1	Yohei Nanbu	Decision (unanimous)	Shooto: Gig Central 5	March 28, 2004	2	5:00	Nagoya, Japan	
Loss	3–1	Hiroyuki Takaya	Decision (unanimous)	Shooto: 7/13 in Korakuen Hall	July 13, 2003	2	5:00	Tokyo, Japan	
Win	3–0	Yoshinori Amari	Submission (armbar)	Shooto: Gig Central 3	March 30, 2003	2	2:38	Nagoya, Japan	
Win	2–0	Edward Button	TKO (punches)	Shooto: Treasure Hunt 11	November 15, 2002	1	4:11	Tokyo, Japan	
Win	1–0	Masanori Sugatani	Submission (rear-naked choke)	Shooto: Gig Central 2	October 6, 2002	1	2:29	Aichi, Japan	Featherweight debut.

== See also ==
- List of current UFC fighters
- List of male mixed martial artists

Sporting positions
Preceded by Takeshi Inoue	9th Shooto World Lightweight Champion; May 30, 2010 – May 31, 2011	Succeeded by Vacant
Preceded by Mark Hominick	TKO World Featherweight Champion; May 5, 2006 – October 2008	Succeeded by The organization was dissolved in 2008.
Preceded by Marlon Sandro	3rd Sengoku Featherweight Champion; December 30, 2010 - June 25, 2011	Succeeded by Vacant
