= Cole Miller =

American mixed martial arts fighter

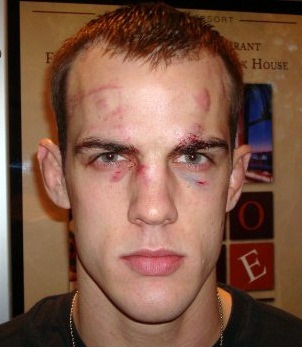
- Born: April 26, 1984 (age 42); Augusta, Georgia, U.S.
- Other names: Magrinho
- Height: 6 ft 1 in (1.85 m)
- Weight: 145 lb (66 kg; 10.4 st)
- Division: Featherweight (2005–2006, 2012–present); Lightweight (2006–2011)
- Reach: 76 in (193 cm)
- Fighting out of: Coconut Creek, Florida, U.S.
- Team: American Top Team
- Rank: 3rd degree Black belt in Brazilian Jiu-Jitsu under Marcos "Parrumpinha" Damatta
- Years active: 2003–2016 (MMA)

Mixed martial arts record
- Total: 33
- Wins: 21
- By knockout: 3
- By submission: 15
- By decision: 3
- Losses: 11
- By knockout: 2
- By decision: 9
- No contests: 1

Other information
- Notable relatives: Micah Miller, brother
- Mixed martial arts record from Sherdog

Cole Miller (born April 26, 1984) is a retired American mixed martial artist, who competed in the featherweight division in the UFC.

== Mixed martial arts career ==
Before giving it up to train for MMA full-time, Miller was a standout baseball player at Mount de Sales Academy (in Macon, Georgia), where he was raised. He was also a member of Macon-based Team Praxis, under instructor Cam McHargue, before moving on to American Top Team. Cole's younger brother, Micah, was a professional mixed martial artist with the WEC promotion.

Before turning pro, Cole was the Virginia-based, King of the Ring 135 lb Champion. As a professional, Miller was the WKA Mixed Martial Arts Lightweight Champion as well as the Indiana Based, Legends of Fighting, Lightweight Champion. He trains at the American Top Team academy in Coconut Creek, Florida, under Master Ricardo Liborio, whom he received Blue through Brown Belts in BJJ. Miller is a Brazilian Jiu-jitsu Black Belt under Marcos "Parrumpinha" Da Matta who frequently corners him in his UFC fights. Miller made his featherweight debut in Shooto, being defeated by Shooto World Champion Takeshi Inoue by unanimous decision, while taking the fight on short notice.

=== The Ultimate Fighter ===
Miller was a contestant on The Ultimate Fighter 5 show, featuring lightweights. He was a member of Jens Pulver's Team. Cole won his preliminary fight on the show against Allen Berube by Triangle Choke in the first round. Cole then fought against Joe Lauzon in the quarter-finals of the competition. After a competitive first round, the two fighters engaged quickly in the second, with Cole Miller looking for submissions off his back. Lauzon then landed an illegal elbow to the back of Miller's head.

After taking the recovery time, Miller signaled that he was okay and the fight resumed. Lauzon immediately took Miller down and starting landing clean shots. Miller covered up and refused to improve his position, prompting the referee to stop the fight. After the fight, both Dana White and Lauzon were unhappy with the outcome of the fight, stating that the illegal blow was what caused Miller to stop attacking and cover up.

=== Ultimate Fighting Championship ===
Miller made his official UFC debut at The Ultimate Fighter 5 Finale, defeating Andy Wang via TKO at 1:10 of the 1st round.

He then went on to defeat Leonard Garcia at UFC: Fight Night 11. His winning streak came to a halt when he lost to Jeremy Stephens at UFC: Fight Night 12 by TKO in the 2nd round.

On July 5, 2008, at UFC 86, Cole submitted Brazilian jiu-jitsu black belt and 6-time Brazilian State champion, Jorge Gurgel, with a triangle choke in the 3rd round. Cole was a purple belt in Brazilian Jiu-Jitsu at the time. He later said that it was the biggest win of his career. He was awarded Submission of the Night.

Cole Miller went on to defeat Junie Browning on April 1, 2009, at UFC Fight Night: Condit vs. Kampmann, finishing the fight early in the first round. After Browning was caught by a right hook from Miller, he shot in for a takedown. Miller stuffed it, and locked in a guillotine choke on Browning. Immediately after Miller got the win, he leaned down and yelled in Browning's face, "Who's overrated now?!"

Miller next fought Ultimate Fighter 8 winner Efraín Escudero at UFC 103, losing via first-round KO.

Miller submitted Dan Lauzon on January 2, 2010, at UFC 108 using a kimura with an inverted triangle hold in round one. He was once again awarded Submission of the Night honors.

Miller was expected to face Andre Winner on March 31, 2010, at UFC Fight Night 21, but an injury to Miller forced him from the card. He was replaced by Rafaello Oliveira.

Miller submitted The Ultimate Fighter 9 winner, Ross Pearson, via second round rear-naked choke on September 15, 2010, at UFC Fight Night 22. Coming into his fight with Pearson, many suggested that Miller would look for a takedown due to Pearson's superior striking. However, Miller outstruck Pearson in the second round, rocked him with a left hook, and hopped onto his back to sink in the fight ending rear naked choke. Miller won his second straight Submission of the Night honors.

Miller was expected to face Matt Wiman on January 1, 2011, at UFC 125, but the bout eventually took place on January 22, 2011, at UFC Fight Night 23. Miller was dominated by Wiman, resulting in a unanimous decision defeat.

Miller faced TJ O'Brien on August 14, 2011, at UFC on Versus 5. He won the fight via submission due to a one arm guillotine choke in the second round.

For his next fight Miller dropped to featherweight and faced Steven Siler on March 3, 2012, at UFC on FX 2. He lost the fight via unanimous decision.

Miller fought Nam Phan at UFC on Fox 4 on August 4, 2012. He lost the bout via split decision after three rounds.

Miller faced Bart Palaszewski on April 13, 2013, at The Ultimate Fighter 17 Finale. He won the fight via submission in the first round.

Miller faced Manny Gamburyan on August 17, 2013, at UFC Fight Night 26. He lost the fight via unanimous decision.

Miller faced Andy Ogle on October 26, 2013, at UFC Fight Night 30. He won the fight via unanimous decision.

Miller faced Sam Sicilia on January 15, 2014, at UFC Fight Night 35. He won the fight via rear naked choke in the second round. The win also earned Miller his fourth Submission of the Night bonus award.

On April 9, 2014, Miller announced his new four-fight contract with UFC via Twitter.

Miller was expected to face Conor McGregor on July 19, 2014, at UFC Fight Night 46. However, Miller pulled out of the bout citing a thumb injury and was replaced by Diego Brandão.

Miller faced Max Holloway on February 14, 2015, at UFC Fight Night 60. He lost the fight by unanimous decision.

Miller faced Jim Alers on December 19, 2015, at UFC on Fox 17. The bout was ruled a No Contest after Miller was accidentally poked in the eye by Alers in the second round and was unable to continue.

Miller was expected to face returning veteran B.J. Penn on June 4, 2016, at UFC 199, replacing an injured Dennis Siver. However, Penn was removed from the card on May 23 after he was flagged for a potential anti-doping violation. Miller instead faced Alex Caceres. He lost the fight via unanimous decision.

Miller was expected to face Mizuto Hirota on October 15, 2016, at UFC Fight Night 97. However, the promotion announced on October 6 that they had cancelled the event entirely. In turn, the fight was rescheduled and eventually took place on December 17, 2016, at UFC on Fox 22 Miller lost the bout by unanimous decision. Miller has since been removed from the roster page on the UFC's website.

== Championships and accomplishments ==
- Ultimate Fighting Championship
  - Submission of the Night (Four times)
  - Knockout of the Night (One time)
  - UFC.com Awards
    - 2008: Ranked #6 Submission of the Year vs. Jorge Gurgel
    - 2010: Ranked #2 Submission of the Year vs. Dan Lauzon & Half-Year Awards: Best Submission of the 1HY vs. Dan Lauzon

== Mixed martial arts record ==
Professional record breakdown
33 matches	21 wins	11 losses
By knockout	3	2
By submission	15	0
By decision	3	9
No contests	1	

Res.	Record	Opponent	Method	Event	Date	Round	Time	Location	Notes
Loss	21–11 (1)	Mizuto Hirota	Decision (unanimous)	UFC on Fox: VanZant vs. Waterson	December 17, 2016	3	5:00	Sacramento, California, United States	
Loss	21–10 (1)	Alex Caceres	Decision (unanimous)	UFC 199	June 4, 2016	3	5:00	Inglewood, California, United States	
NC	21–9 (1)	Jim Alers	NC (accidental eye poke)	UFC on Fox: dos Anjos vs. Cowboy 2	December 19, 2015	2	1:44	Orlando, Florida, United States	Eyepoke rendered Miller unable to continue.
Loss	21–9	Max Holloway	Decision (unanimous)	UFC Fight Night: Henderson vs. Thatch	February 14, 2015	3	5:00	Broomfield, Colorado, United States	
Win	21–8	Sam Sicilia	Submission (rear-naked choke)	UFC Fight Night: Rockhold vs. Philippou	January 15, 2014	2	1:54	Duluth, Georgia, United States	Submission of the Night.
Win	20–8	Andy Ogle	Decision (unanimous)	UFC Fight Night: Machida vs. Muñoz	October 26, 2013	3	5:00	Manchester, England	
Loss	19–8	Manny Gamburyan	Decision (unanimous)	UFC Fight Night: Shogun vs. Sonnen	August 17, 2013	3	5:00	Boston, Massachusetts, United States	
Win	19–7	Bart Palaszewski	Submission (rear-naked choke)	The Ultimate Fighter: Team Jones vs. Team Sonnen Finale	April 13, 2013	1	4:23	Las Vegas, Nevada, United States	
Loss	18–7	Nam Phan	Decision (split)	UFC on Fox: Shogun vs. Vera	August 4, 2012	3	5:00	Los Angeles, California, United States	
Loss	18–6	Steven Siler	Decision (unanimous)	UFC on FX: Alves vs. Kampmann	March 3, 2012	3	5:00	Sydney, Australia	Return to Featherweight.
Win	18–5	TJ O'Brien	Submission (guillotine choke)	UFC Live: Hardy vs. Lytle	August 14, 2011	2	2:38	Milwaukee, Wisconsin, United States	
Loss	17–5	Matt Wiman	Decision (unanimous)	UFC: Fight for the Troops 2	January 22, 2011	3	5:00	Fort Hood, Texas, United States	
Win	17–4	Ross Pearson	Submission (rear-naked choke)	UFC Fight Night: Marquardt vs. Palhares	September 15, 2010	2	1:49	Austin, Texas, United States	Submission of the Night.
Win	16–4	Dan Lauzon	Submission (modified kimura)	UFC 108	January 2, 2010	1	3:05	Las Vegas, Nevada, United States	Submission of the Night.
Loss	15–4	Efraín Escudero	KO (punches)	UFC 103	September 19, 2009	1	3:36	Dallas, Texas, United States	
Win	15–3	Junie Browning	Submission (guillotine choke)	UFC Fight Night: Condit vs. Kampmann	April 1, 2009	1	1:58	Nashville, Tennessee, United States	
Win	14–3	Jorge Gurgel	Submission (triangle choke)	UFC 86	July 5, 2008	3	4:48	Las Vegas, Nevada, United States	Submission of the Night.
Loss	13–3	Jeremy Stephens	TKO (punches and elbows)	UFC Fight Night: Swick vs. Burkman	January 23, 2008	2	4:44	Las Vegas, Nevada, United States	
Win	13–2	Leonard Garcia	Decision (unanimous)	UFC Fight Night: Thomas vs. Florian	September 19, 2007	3	5:00	Las Vegas, Nevada, United States	
Win	12–2	Andy Wang	TKO (head kick and punches)	The Ultimate Fighter 5 Finale	June 23, 2007	1	1:10	Las Vegas, Nevada, United States	Knockout of the Night.
Win	11–2	Josh Souder	Decision (split)	LOF 10: Unbreakable	November 3, 2006	3	5:00	Indianapolis, Indiana, United States	
Win	10–2	John Strawn	Submission (armbar)	Absolute Fighting Championships 19	October 21, 2006	1	2:21	Boca Raton, Florida, United States	Lightweight debut.
Loss	9–2	Takeshi Inoue	Decision (unanimous)	Shooto 2006: 7/21 in Korakuen Hall	July 21, 2006	3	5:00	Tokyo, Japan	
Win	9–1	Saul Mitchell	Submission (triangle choke)	Diesel Fighting Championships 1	June 30, 2006	1	3:19	Dallas, Texas, United States	
Win	8–1	Joe Germain	Submission (guillotine choke)	Full Throttle 7	June 10, 2006	1	0:36	Duluth, Georgia, United States	
Win	7–1	Vince Libardi	Submission (guillotine choke)	International Freestyle Fighting 1	May 6, 2006	1	0:16	Fort Worth, Texas, United States	
Win	6–1	Dwayne Shelton	Submission (rear-naked choke)	CSC: River City Rumble	February 18, 2006	3	3:48	Mechanicsville, Virginia, United States	
Win	5–1	Jarrett Becks	Submission (guillotine choke)	Full Throttle 6	February 11, 2006	1	1:01	Atlanta, Georgia, United States	
Win	4–1	David Love	TKO (punches)	North American Combat Challenge 2	December 17, 2005	1	1:26	Key West, Florida, United States	
Loss	3–1	Josh Odom	Decision (majority)	Full Throttle 5	November 4, 2005	3	5:00	Duluth, Georgia, United States	
Win	3–0	Tim Honeycutt	KO (knee)	Full Throttle 4	September 9, 2005	1	0:23	Duluth, Georgia, United States	
Win	2–0	Chris Mickle	Submission (triangle choke)	Full Throttle 3	July 15, 2005	1	1:39	Duluth, Georgia, United States	
Win	1–0	Harris Norwood	Submission (triangle choke)	Full Throttle 2	June 3, 2005	1	3:14	Atlanta, Georgia, United States	

== Mixed martial arts exhibition record ==
Professional record breakdown
2 matches	1 win	1 loss
By knockout	0	1
By submission	1	0
By decision	0	0

Res.	Record	Opponent	Method	Event	Date	Round	Time	Location	Notes
Loss	1–1	Joe Lauzon	TKO (punches)	The Ultimate Fighter 5	May 24, 2007 (air date)	2	3:58	Las Vegas, Nevada, United States	TUF 5 quarterfinal
Win	1–0	Allen Berube	Submission (triangle choke)	The Ultimate Fighter 5	April 5, 2007 (air date)	1	2:33	Las Vegas, Nevada, United States	TUF 5 elimination round

== See also ==
- List of current UFC fighters
- List of male mixed martial artists
