= UFC Live: Hardy vs. Lytle =

UFC mixed martial arts event in 2011

- The poster for UFC Live: Hardy vs. Lytle
- Promotion: Ultimate Fighting Championship
- Date: August 14, 2011
- Venue: Bradley Center
- City: Milwaukee, Wisconsin
- Attendance: 6,751
- Total gate: $539,000

Event chronology
UFC 133: Evans vs. Ortiz	UFC Live: Hardy vs. Lytle	UFC 134: Silva vs. Okami

UFC Live: Hardy vs. Lytle (also known as UFC on Versus 5) was a mixed martial arts event held by the Ultimate Fighting Championship on August 14, 2011, at the Bradley Center in Milwaukee, Wisconsin. The event was the first that the UFC has hosted in Wisconsin. The event was broadcast on Rogers Sportsnet and Versus.

== Background ==
Karlos Vemola was originally scheduled to face Stephan Bonnar in this event, but Bonnar was replaced by newcomer Ronny Markes after sustaining a training injury.

Paul Taylor was scheduled to face John Makdessi at this event, but Makdessi was forced from the bout with an injury and was replaced by Donald Cerrone. In early July, Taylor had pulled out of his fight due to a broken foot and was replaced by Charles Oliveira.

Tom Lawlor was forced from his bout with Kyle Noke due to an injury during training, he was replaced by Ed Herman.

Leonard Garcia was expected to face Alex Caceres, but was forced out of the bout with an injury and replaced by newcomer Jimy Hettes.

UK viewers could watch the event for free on UFC TV or on Premier Sports in Great Britain.

At the weigh ins, Chris Lytle handed Dana White a thank-you letter and informed him that he will be retiring after this bout.

The UFC teamed up with Milwaukee's Harley-Davidson Museum, and Chris Lytle won a new 2012 Harley-Davidson Blackline motorcycle for winning the main event.

Nate Diaz was in attendance at this event.

== Results ==
Main Card (Versus)
Weight class				Method	Round	Time	Notes
Welterweight	Chris Lytle	def.	Dan Hardy	Submission (guillotine choke)	3	4:16
Lightweight	Benson Henderson	def.	Jim Miller	Decision (unanimous) (30–27, 29–28, 30–26)	3	5:00
Lightweight	Donald Cerrone	def.	Charles Oliveira	TKO (punches)	1	3:01
Welterweight	Duane Ludwig	def.	Amir Sadollah	Decision (unanimous) (29–28, 29–28, 29–28)	3	5:00
Preliminary card (Facebook)
Weight class				Method	Round	Time	Notes
Middleweight	Jared Hamman	def.	C. B. Dollaway	TKO (punches)	2	3:38
Bantamweight	Joseph Benavidez	def.	Eddie Wineland	Decision (unanimous) (30–27, 30–27, 30–27)	3	5:00
Middleweight	Ed Herman	def.	Kyle Noke	Submission (inverted heel hook)	1	4:15
Light Heavyweight	Ronny Markes	def.	Karlos Vemola	Decision (unanimous) (30–27, 30–27, 30–27)	3	5:00
Featherweight	Jimy Hettes	def.	Alex Caceres	Submission (rear-naked choke)	2	3:12
Lightweight	Cole Miller	def.	T.J. O'Brien	Submission (guillotine choke)	2	2:38
Lightweight	Jacob Volkmann	def.	Danny Castillo	Decision (unanimous) (29–28, 29–28, 29–28)	3	5:00
Bantamweight	Edwin Figueroa	def.	Jason Reinhardt	TKO (elbows and punches)	2	0:50

== Bonus awards ==
The following fighters received $65,000 bonuses.

- Fight of the Night: Dan Hardy vs. Chris Lytle
- Knockout of the Night: Donald Cerrone
- Submission of the Night: Chris Lytle

== Reported payout ==
The following is the reported payout to the fighters as reported to the Wisconsin's Department of Safety and Professional Services. It does not include sponsor money or "locker room" bonuses often given by the UFC and also do not include the UFC's traditional "fight night" bonuses.

- Chris Lytle: $70,000 ($35,000 win bonus) def. Dan Hardy: $25,000
- Ben Henderson: $34,000 ($17,000 win bonus) def. Jim Miller: $35,000
- Donald Cerrone: $44,000 ($22,000 win bonus) def. Charles Oliveira: $12,000
- Duane Ludwig: $32,000 ($16,000 win bonus) def. Amir Sadollah: $20,000
- Jared Hamman: $24,000 ($12,000 win bonus) def. C.B. Dollaway: $20,000
- Joseph Benavidez: $43,000 ($21,500 win bonus) def. Eddie Wineland: $10,000
- Ed Herman: $52,000 ($26,000 win bonus) def. Kyle Noke: $8,000
- Ronny Markes: $16,000 ($8,000 win bonus) def. Karlos Vemola: $10,000
- Jim Hettes: $12,000 ($6,000 win bonus) def. Alex Caceres: $8,000
- Cole Miler: $34,000 ($17,000 win bonus) def. T.J. O'Brien: $6,000
- Jacob Volkmann: $28,000 ($14,000 win bonus) def. Danny Castillo: $17,000
- Edwin Figueroa: $12,000 ($6,000 win bonus) def. Jason Reinhardt: $6,000

== See also ==
- List of UFC events
