= Francisco Rivera (fighter) =

American mixed martial arts fighter

- Born: October 8, 1981 (age 45); Whittier, California, United States
- Other names: Cisco
- Height: 5 ft 8 in (1.73 m)
- Weight: 135 lb (61 kg; 9.6 st)
- Division: Bantamweight; Featherweight
- Reach: 70 in (180 cm)
- Fighting out of: Buena Park, California, United States
- Team: United Mixed Martial Arts; All In MMA; CSW
- Years active: 2008–present

Mixed martial arts record
- Total: 31
- Wins: 16
- By knockout: 10
- By decision: 6
- Losses: 12
- By knockout: 3
- By submission: 5
- By decision: 4
- No contests: 3

Other information
- Mixed martial arts record from Sherdog

Francisco Rivera Jr. (born October 8, 1981) is an American former mixed martial artist who last competed in XMMA. A professional since 2008, he has also competed for the UFC, WEC and Tachi Palace Fights. Rivera is known for his heavy hands and wild fighting style.

== Background ==
Rivera graduated from Buena Park High School where he excelled in football eventually playing for Orange Coast College, until his foot was broken.

== Mixed martial arts career ==
=== World Extreme Cagefighting ===
Rivera made his WEC debut replacing an injured Josh Grispi against Erik Koch at WEC 52. He lost the fight via TKO in the first round.

=== Ultimate Fighting Championship ===
On October 28, 2010, World Extreme Cagefighting merged with the Ultimate Fighting Championship. As part of the merger, most WEC fighters were transferred into the UFC.

Rivera was expected to drop to Bantamweight and face Takeya Mizugaki on March 3, 2011, at UFC Live: Sanchez vs. Kampmann. However, Rivera was forced out of the bout with an injury and replaced by promotional newcomer Reuben Duran.

Rivera faced Reuben Duran on June 4, 2011, at The Ultimate Fighter 13 Finale. He lost the fight via submission in the third round and was subsequently released from the promotion.

=== Return to the UFC ===
Following two emphatic first round stoppages on the regional circuit, Rivera was re-signed by the UFC to face Alex Soto on May 15, 2012, at UFC on Fuel TV: The Korean Zombie vs. Poirier, replacing Azamat Gashimov who was removed from the bout. Rivera won the fight via unanimous decision (30–27, 30–27, 30–27).

Rivera was expected to replace Edwin Figueroa against Ken Stone on June 22, 2012, at UFC on FX 4. However, Rivera was forced out of the bout with an injury and replaced by Dustin Pague.

Rivera faced Roland Delorme on July 21, 2012, at UFC 149. Rivera defeated Delorme via first-round KO. However, Rivera later failed his post-fight drug test for an over-the-counter stimulant and the win was overturned to a No Contest.

After being clipped twice in the first round, Rivera rallied to defeat Edwin Figueroa on February 2, 2013, at UFC 156 in the second round, staggering him before getting a TKO stoppage.

Rivera was expected to face Hugo Viana on April 20, 2013, at UFC on Fox 7. However, Rivera was forced out of the bout with an injury and replaced by T.J. Dillashaw.

Rivera was expected to face George Roop on October 19, 2013, at UFC 166. However, the pairing was shifted to November 6, 2013, at UFC Fight Night 31. He won the fight via TKO in the second round.

Rivera was expected to face Raphael Assunção at UFC 170. However, Rivera was forced out of the bout due to injury.

Rivera faced Takeya Mizugaki on May 24, 2014, at UFC 173. He lost the fight via unanimous decision.

Rivera faced Urijah Faber on December 6, 2014, at UFC 181. Rivera lost the fight via second round submission. However, the ending was controversial as Faber stunned Rivera with an eyepoke during a standup exchange. The eyepoke went unnoticed by the referee, but immediately preceded the fight ending submission. Rivera's management team indicated that they planned to appeal the result in hopes that it would be changed to a no contest, and hoped that the UFC could schedule a rematch with Faber. Ultimately, the NSAC upheld the result of a submission victory for Faber.

Rivera faced Alex Caceres on June 6, 2015, at UFC Fight Night 68. He won the fight via knockout in the first round.

Rivera faced John Lineker on September 5, 2015, at UFC 191. He lost the fight via submission in the first round. The wild slugfest earned both participants Fight of the Night honors.

Rivera faced Brad Pickett on February 27, 2016, at UFC Fight Night 84. He lost the back-and-forth fight via split decision.

Rivera next faced Erik Pérez on July 30, 2016, at UFC 201. He lost the fight via unanimous decision.

Rivera received a four-year USADA suspension for testing positive for a banned substance clenbuterol, collected from an out of competition sample on July 23, 2016. He was subsequently released from the promotion.

=== XMMA and Combate Global ===
Rivera was given a license to compete in California, and was scheduled to fight Trevin Jones at LXF 6 on March 20, 2020, but the event was cancelled due to the COVID-19 pandemic.

Rivera then faced Ryan Lilley at XMMA 8 on January 30, 2021. He won the fight via first-round knockout.

Rivera faced Adam Martinez in the first bout of the one night bantamweight tournament at Combate Global: Bantamweight Tournament on May 29, 2021. He won the bout via KO in the first round of a one round bout. In the Semifinals, he faced fellow UFC vet Nohelin Hernandez, who he defeated via unanimous decision. In the finals, Rivera faced David Martínez, to whom he lost in the second round after being dropped by a head kick and finished on the ground.

Rivera faced John Dodson on April 2, 2022, at XMMA 4. He lost the bout via unanimous decision.

=== Up Next Fighting ===
Rivera faced Teruto Ishihara on August 20, 2022, at UNF 2. He won the bout via unanimous decision.

Rivera faced fellow UFC veteran Cody Gibson at Up Next Fighting 3: Rivera vs. Gibson for the inaugural UNF Bantamweight Championship. Rivera lost the bout via submission in the third round due to an arm triangle choke.

=== Post-career ===
Rivera returned to XMMA on May 3, 2023, at XMMA 6, facing Ricky Bandejas. The bout ended in a no contest after Rivera was poked in the eye in the second round and was unable to continue.

On July 1, 2023, Rivera would then face Dana White's Contender Series alum Josh Wang-Kim for the interim UNF bantamweight championship at UNF 9. He won the bout via unanimous decision and became the interim bantamweight champion.

Rivera would then face fellow UFC veteran Jesse Strader at UNF 16 for the vacant UNF Featherweight title on February 24, 2024. The fight was declared a no contest in the second round after Rivera was rendered unable to continue due to an unintentional eyepoke.

Rivera faced Albert Morales at UNF 21 on November 30, 2024 and lost by technical knockout via ground punches. In the post-fight interview, Rivera retired from MMA competition.

== Championships and achievements ==
- Ultimate Fighting Championship
  - Fight of the Night (One time) vs. John Lineker
  - UFC.com Awards
    - 2015: Ranked #5 Fight of the Year vs. John Lineker
- Sherdog
  - 2012 All-Violence First Team
  - 2013 All-Violence Third Team

== Mixed martial arts record ==
Professional record breakdown
31 matches	16 wins	12 losses
By knockout	10	3
By submission	0	5
By decision	6	4
No contests	3	

Res.	Record	Opponent	Method	Event	Date	Round	Time	Location	Notes
Loss	16–12 (3)	Jesse Strader	Submission (guillotine choke)	Up Next Fighting 33	May 9, 2026	1	4:01	Commerce, California, United States	
Loss	16–11 (3)	Albert Morales	TKO (punches)	Up Next Fighting 21	November 30, 2024	1	4:44	Commerce, California, United States	
NC	16–10 (3)	Jesse Strader	NC (accidental eye poke)	Up Next Fighting 16	February 24, 2024	2	4:33	Commerce, California, United States	For the vacant UNF Featherweight Championship. Accidental eye poke rendered Rivera unable to continue.
Win	16–10 (2)	Josh Wang-Kim	Decision (unanimous)	Up Next Fighting 9	July 1, 2023	3	5:00	Commerce, California, United States	Return to Featherweight.
NC	15–10 (2)	Ricky Bandejas	NC (accidental eye poke)	XMMA 6	May 3, 2023	2	0:58	Myrtle Beach, South Carolina, United States	Catchweight (140 lb) bout. Accidental eye poke rendered Rivera unable to continue.
Loss	15–10 (1)	Cody Gibson	Submission (arm-triangle choke)	Up Next Fighting 3	November 19, 2022	3	2:42	Commerce, California, United States	For the UNF Bantamweight Championship.
Win	15–9 (1)	Teruto Ishihara	Decision (unanimous)	Up Next Fighting 2	August 20, 2022	3	5:00	Commerce, California, United States	Catchweight (140 lb) bout.
Loss	14–9 (1)	John Dodson	Decision (unanimous)	XMMA 4	April 2, 2022	3	5:00	New Orleans, Louisiana, United States	
Loss	14–8 (1)	David Martínez	KO (head kick and punches)	Combate Global: Bantamweight Tournament	May 29, 2021	2	0:17	Miami, Florida, United States	Combate Global Bantamweight Tournament Final.
Win	14–7 (1)	Nohelin Hernandez	Decision (unanimous)	Combate Global: Bantamweight Tournament	May 29, 2021	3	5:00	Miami, Florida, United States	Combate Global Bantamweight Tournament Semifinal.
Win	13–7 (1)	Adam Martinez	KO (punch)	Combate Global: Bantamweight Tournament	May 29, 2021	1	2:39	Miami, Florida, United States	Combate Global Bantamweight Tournament QuarterFinal.
Win	12–7 (1)	Ryan Lilley	TKO (punches)	XMMA: Vick vs Fialho	January 30, 2021	1	4:03	West Palm Beach, Florida, United States	Catchweight (140 lb) bout.
Loss	11–7 (1)	Erik Pérez	Decision (unanimous)	UFC 201	July 30, 2016	3	5:00	Atlanta, Georgia, United States	
Loss	11–6 (1)	Brad Pickett	Decision (split)	UFC Fight Night: Silva vs. Bisping	February 27, 2016	3	5:00	London, England	
Loss	11–5 (1)	John Lineker	Submission (guillotine choke)	UFC 191	September 5, 2015	1	2:08	Las Vegas, Nevada, United States	Fight of the Night.
Win	11–4 (1)	Alex Caceres	KO (punches)	UFC Fight Night: Boetsch vs. Henderson	June 6, 2015	1	0:21	New Orleans, Louisiana, United States	
Loss	10–4 (1)	Urijah Faber	Submission (bulldog choke)	UFC 181	December 6, 2014	2	1:34	Las Vegas, Nevada, United States	
Loss	10–3 (1)	Takeya Mizugaki	Decision (unanimous)	UFC 173	May 24, 2014	3	5:00	Las Vegas, Nevada, United States	
Win	10–2 (1)	George Roop	TKO (punches)	UFC: Fight for the Troops 3	November 6, 2013	2	2:20	Fort Campbell, Kentucky, United States	
Win	9–2 (1)	Edwin Figueroa	TKO (punches)	UFC 156	February 2, 2013	2	4:20	Las Vegas, Nevada, United States	
NC	8–2 (1)	Roland Delorme	NC (overturned)	UFC 149	July 21, 2012	1	4:19	Calgary, Alberta, Canada	Originally a KO (punches) win for Rivera; overturned after he tested positive for ephedra.
Win	8–2	Alex Soto	Decision (unanimous)	UFC on Fuel TV: Korean Zombie vs. Poirier	May 15, 2012	3	5:00	Fairfax, Virginia, United States	
Win	7–2	Antonio Duarte	KO (punches)	Tachi Palace Fights 12	March 9, 2012	1	1:15	Lemoore, California, United States	
Win	6–2	Brad McDonald	KO (punches)	Tachi Palace Fights 11	December 2, 2011	1	0:40	Lemoore, California, United States	
Loss	5–2	Reuben Duran	Submission (rear-naked choke)	The Ultimate Fighter: Team Lesnar vs. Team dos Santos Finale	June 4, 2011	3	1:57	Las Vegas, Nevada, United States	Bantamweight debut.
Loss	5–1	Erik Koch	TKO (head kick and punches)	WEC 52	November 11, 2010	1	1:36	Las Vegas, Nevada, United States	
Win	5–0	Fernando Bernstein	TKO (punches)	Called Out MMA 2	January 24, 2010	1	0:30	Ontario, California, United States	
Win	4–0	Aaron Arana	Decision (majority)	Called Out MMA 1	August 15, 2009	3	5:00	Ontario, California, United States	
Win	3–0	Johnny Gomez	Decision (unanimous)	Call To Arms 1	May 16, 2009	3	5:00	Ontario, California, United States	
Win	2–0	Chris Drumm	KO (punches)	California Xtreme Fighting 8	October 30, 2008	1	0:46	El Monte, California, United States	
Win	1–0	Ray Cox	KO (punches)	California Xtreme Fighting: Uprising in Upland	June 14, 2008	1	0:52	Upland, California, United States	Featherweight debut.

== Amateur mixed martial arts record ==
Amateur record breakdown		
1 match	1 win	0 losses
By knockout	1	0

Res.	Record	Opponent	Method	Event	Date	Round	Time	Location	Notes
Win	1–0	Adam Martinez	KO (punch)	Combate Global: Bantamweight Tournament	May 29, 2021	1	2:39	Miami, Florida, United States	Combate Global Bantamweight QuarterFinals.

== See also ==
- List of male mixed martial artists
