= UFC Live: Sanchez vs. Kampmann =

UFC mixed martial arts event in 2011

- The poster for UFC Live: Sanchez vs. Kampmann
- Promotion: Ultimate Fighting Championship
- Date: March 3, 2011
- Venue: KFC Yum! Center
- City: Louisville, Kentucky
- Attendance: 8,319
- Total gate: $471,450

Event chronology
UFC 127: Penn vs. Fitch	UFC Live: Sanchez vs. Kampmann	UFC 128: Shogun vs. Jones

UFC Live: Sanchez vs. Kampmann (also known as UFC on Versus 3) was a mixed martial arts event held by the Ultimate Fighting Championship that took place on March 3, 2011, at the KFC Yum! Center in Louisville, Kentucky. The event was broadcast on Versus in the U.S. and Rogers Sportsnet One in Canada. This was the first UFC event to be broadcast in 3D.

== Background ==
This event was the first UFC event hosted in Kentucky.

Matt Brown was expected to face Mark Scanlon at the event, but Scanlon was forced off the card and was to be replaced by Matt Riddle. However, the match was cancelled after Riddle injured his right hand on January 20.

Maiquel Falcao was due to take on Alessio Sakara, but pulled out of the bout due to an injury. Rafael Natal was to step in as his replacement, however on February 12, it was announced that Natal had pulled out of the bout due to a knee injury. Natal was replaced by Chris Weidman, making his UFC debut at this event.

Rousimar Palhares was set to face Alexandre Ferreira. However, on January 18, Ferreira was dismissed from Chute Boxe, his home training camp, citing a "lack of communication." Less than an hour later, it was reported that Ferreira would not be competing after losing family and friends in the Brazilian floods, resulting in him being in "no condition to train or fight." and was replaced by David Branch.

A bout between Johny Hendricks and Paulo Thiago was expected for the event. However, the bout was canceled after Thiago was forced out with an elbow injury.

Takeya Mizugaki was scheduled to take on Francisco Rivera, but on February 12, Rivera had to pull out due to an undisclosed training injury. Mizugaki instead faced UFC newcomer Reuben Duran.

Cub Swanson was due to take on Erik Koch at this event, but the bout was cancelled after Swanson suffered a training injury. Koch was instead moved to a fight with Raphael Assunção at UFC 128.

The Stevenson vs Castillo and Cantwell vs Diabaté bouts streamed on the UFC's official Facebook page.

Former World Extreme Cagefighting play by play announcer Todd Harris called the 3D broadcast of this event, with UFC featherweight Kenny Florian on color commentary. They had previously done commentary together at WEC 41 and WEC 49.

The event drew an average of 681,000 viewers on Versus.

== Results ==
Main card
Weight class				Method	Round	Time	Notes
Welterweight	Diego Sanchez	def.	Martin Kampmann	Decision (unanimous) (29–28, 29–28, 29–28)	3	5:00
Middleweight	Mark Muñoz	def.	C. B. Dollaway	TKO (punches)	1	0:54
Middleweight	Chris Weidman	def.	Alessio Sakara	Decision (unanimous) (30–27, 30–27, 30–27)	3	5:00
Bantamweight	Brian Bowles	def.	Damacio Page	Submission (guillotine choke)	1	3:30
Preliminary card (Facebook)
Light Heavyweight	Cyrille Diabaté	def.	Steve Cantwell	Decision (unanimous) (30–27, 30–25, 30–26)	3	5:00
Lightweight	Danny Castillo	def.	Joe Stevenson	Decision (unanimous) (30–27, 29–28, 29–28)	3	5:00
Preliminary card
Lightweight	Shane Roller	def.	Thiago Tavares	KO (punches)	2	1:28	(Note: This bout aired on the broadcast following the Munoz vs Dollaway bout.)
Bantamweight	Takeya Mizugaki	def.	Reuben Duran	Decision (split) (27–30, 30–27, 29–28)	3	5:00
Middleweight	Dongi Yang	def.	Rob Kimmons	TKO (punches)	2	4:47
Middleweight	Rousimar Palhares	def.	David Branch	Submission (kneebar)	2	1:44
Light Heavyweight	Igor Pokrajac	def.	Todd Brown	TKO (knee and punches)	1	5:00	(Note: This bout aired on the broadcast following the Bowles vs Page bout.)

== Bonus awards ==
The following fighters received bonuses.

- Fight of the Night: Diego Sanchez vs. Martin Kampmann ($160,000 each)
- Knockout of the Night: Shane Roller ($40,000)
- Submission of the Night: Brian Bowles ($40,000)
