= Hugo Viana (fighter) =

Brazilian mixed martial artist

- Born: Hugo Viana; September 26, 1982 (age 44); Salvador, Bahia, Brazil
- Other names: Wolverine
- Height: 5 ft 6 in (1.68 m)
- Weight: 135 lb (61 kg; 9.6 st)
- Division: Bantamweight (135 lb); Featherweight (145 lb)
- Reach: 67.0 in (170 cm)
- Style: Tae Kwon Do; Boxing; Wing Chun
- Fighting out of: Salvador, Bahia, Brazil
- Team: Champion Team
- Rank: Brown belt in Brazilian Jiu-Jitsu; Black belt in Taekwondo
- Years active: 2010–2016

Mixed martial arts record
- Total: 12
- Wins: 8
- By knockout: 1
- By decision: 7
- Losses: 4
- By knockout: 2
- By decision: 2

Other information
- Mixed martial arts record from Sherdog

Hugo Viana (born September 26, 1982) is a Brazilian former mixed martial artist. A professional MMA competitor since 2010, Viana made a name for himself competing on the first season of Globo's The Ultimate Fighter: Brazil. He formerly competed for the Ultimate Fighting Championship (UFC), fighting in its bantamweight division.

== Mixed martial arts career ==
Viana decided to begin training in mixed martial arts in 2010 after admiring the sport for several years and having trained in Tae Kwon Do since he was 12 years old and in Boxing and Wing Chun since age of 21. In 2005, he took up Brazilian jiu-jitsu before he began his MMA training with Champions Team MMA in his hometown of Salvador, Bahia, Brazil. Wolverine (nicknamed after the Marvel Comics character) did not spend long on the amateur circuit, only competing in one fight before turning professional only a few months later.

He made his professional debut on May 26, 2010, against Marcelo Santos at a Win Fight and Entertainment event. Hugo won the fight via unanimous decision after three rounds. He fought on the next Win Fight card in August 2010 against Marcelo Palombo de Souza, winning the fight via split decision. From November 2010 to September 2011 Hugo fought three times, winning all three fights via unanimous decision to bring his record to 5-0. He tried out for a spot on the first installment of The Ultimate Fighter: Brazil and was selected.

=== The Ultimate Fighter ===
In March 2012, it was revealed that Wolverine was selected to be a participant on The Ultimate Fighter: Brazil. He defeated Alexandre Ramos via TKO in the first round to move into the Ultimate Fighter house, and become an official cast member.

Viana was selected as the second pick (fourth overall) by Vitor Belfort, to be a part of Team Vitor. In the first round of the tournament, Hugo was selected to fight Marcos Vina of Team Wanderlei. After two close rounds, Wolverine was announced the winner via unanimous decision.

In the semi-finals, Hugo fought Rony Mariano Bezerra, losing the fight via unanimous decision, thus eliminating him from the tournament.

=== Ultimate Fighting Championship ===
Viana made his UFC debut on June 23, 2012, at UFC 147 against John Teixeira. The fight was contested at a catchweight of 150 lbs. after Teixeira missed weight. He won the fight via split decision (29-28, 28-29, 29-28).

Viana dropped down to the Bantamweight division for his next fight on December 15, 2012, at The Ultimate Fighter 16 Finale against Reuben Duran. He won the fight via KO in the first round.

Viana was expected to face Francisco Rivera on April 20, 2013, at UFC on Fox 7. However, Rivera was forced out of the bout with an injury and replaced by T.J. Dillashaw. He lost the fight via TKO in the first round.

Viana was expected to face Johnny Bedford on September 4, 2013, at UFC Fight Night 28. However, Bedford pulled out of the bout citing an injury and was replaced by Wilson Reis. However, just days before the event, Viana was forced out of the bout with an injury, removing their fight from the card altogether.

Viana faced Junior Hernandez at UFC on Fox 10. He won the fight via unanimous decision.

Viana faced Aljamain Sterling on July 16, 2014, at UFC Fight Night 45. He lost the fight via TKO in the third round.

Viana faced Guido Cannetti on August 1, 2015, at UFC 190. He lost the fight by unanimous decision and was subsequently released from the promotion.

== Mixed martial arts record ==
Professional record breakdown
12 matches	8 wins	4 losses
By knockout	1	2
By submission	0	0
By decision	7	2

Res.	Record	Opponent	Method	Event	Date	Round	Time	Location	Notes
Loss	8–4	Zac Riley	Decision (unanimous)	RFA 34	January 15, 2016	3	5:00	Broomfield, Colorado, United States	
Loss	8–3	Guido Cannetti	Decision (unanimous)	UFC 190	August 1, 2015	3	5:00	Rio de Janeiro, Brazil	
Loss	8–2	Aljamain Sterling	TKO (punches)	UFC Fight Night: Cowboy vs. Miller	July 16, 2014	3	3:50	Atlantic City, New Jersey, United States	
Win	8–1	Junior Hernandez	Decision (unanimous)	UFC on Fox: Henderson vs. Thomson	January 25, 2014	3	5:00	Chicago, Illinois, United States	
Loss	7–1	T.J. Dillashaw	TKO (punches)	UFC on Fox: Henderson vs. Melendez	April 20, 2013	1	4:22	San Jose, California, United States	
Win	7–0	Reuben Duran	KO (punch)	The Ultimate Fighter: Team Carwin vs. Team Nelson Finale	December 15, 2012	1	4:05	Las Vegas, Nevada, United States	Bantamweight debut.
Win	6–0	John Macapá	Decision (split)	UFC 147	June 23, 2012	3	5:00	Belo Horizonte, Brazil	Catchweight (150 lbs) bout; Teixeira missed weight.
Win	5–0	Thiago Nascimento	Decision (unanimous)	Win Fight and Entertainment 10	September 16, 2011	3	5:00	Salvador, Brazil	
Win	4–0	Rafael Sobral	Decision (unanimous)	Win Fight and Entertainment 9	May 14, 2011	3	5:00	Salvador, Brazil	
Win	3–0	Dingo Sampaio	Decision (unanimous)	Demo Fight 5	November 21, 2010	3	5:00	Salvador, Brazil	
Win	2–0	Marcelo Palombo	Decision (split)	Win Fight and Entertainment 7	August 21, 2010	3	5:00	Salvador, Brazil	
Win	1–0	Marcelo Santos	Decision (unanimous)	Win Fight and Entertainment 6	May 26, 2010	3	5:00	Salvador, Brazil	Featherweight debut.

=== Mixed martial arts exhibition record ===
Exhibition record breakdown		
3 matches	2 wins	1 loss
By knockout	1	0
By decision	1	1

Res.	Record	Opponent	Method	Event	Date	Round	Time	Location	Notes
Loss	2-1	Rony Jason	Decision (unanimous)	The Ultimate Fighter: Brazil	June 17, 2012 (airdate)	3	5:00	São Paulo, Brazil	The Ultimate Fighter: Brazil semifinal round.
Win	2-0	Marcos Vinicius	Decision (unanimous)	The Ultimate Fighter: Brazil	April 29, 2012 (airdate)	2	5:00	São Paulo, Brazil	The Ultimate Fighter: Brazil preliminary round.
Win	1-0	Alexandre Ramos	TKO (punches)	The Ultimate Fighter: Brazil	March 25, 2012 (airdate)	1	0:00	São Paulo, Brazil	The Ultimate Fighter: Brazil elimination round.

== See also ==
- List of current UFC fighters
- List of male mixed martial artists
