= Urijah Faber =

American mixed martial arts fighter

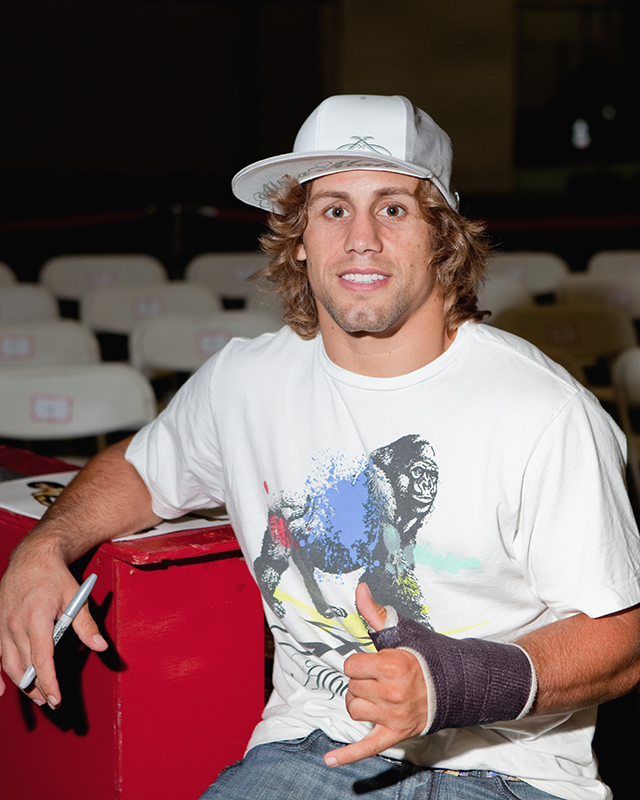
- Faber in 2009
- Born: Urijah Christopher Faber; May 14, 1979 (age 47); Isla Vista, California, U.S.
- Other names: The California Kid
- Height: 5 ft 5 in (165 cm)
- Weight: 135 lb (61 kg; 9 st 9 lb)
- Division: Bantamweight (2003–2006; 2010–2016; 2019); Featherweight (2006–2010; 2015)
- Reach: 67 in (170 cm)
- Fighting out of: Sacramento, California, U.S.
- Team: Team Alpha Male
- Trainer: Thonglor "Master Thong" Armatsena; Fábio "Pateta" Prado; Martin Kampmann
- Rank: Black belt in Brazilian Jiu-Jitsu under Fábio "Pateta" Prado
- Wrestling: NCAA Division I Wrestling
- Years active: 2003–2016, 2019

Mixed martial arts record
- Total: 46
- Wins: 35
- By knockout: 10
- By submission: 17
- By decision: 7
- By disqualification: 1
- Losses: 11
- By knockout: 4
- By decision: 7

Other information
- University: University of California, Davis
- Notable school: Lincoln High School
- Website: urijahfaber.com
- Mixed martial arts record from Sherdog

Urijah Christopher Faber (/jəˈraɪə ˈfeɪbər/ yoo-RY-ə FAY-bər; born May 14, 1979) is an American former mixed martial artist and actor. He competed in the bantamweight and featherweight divisions of the Ultimate Fighting Championship (UFC), having competed for the UFC Bantamweight Championship on three occasions (once for the interim title), and the featherweight division of the World Extreme Cagefighting (WEC), where he is a former WEC featherweight champion. He is the founder of Team Alpha Male.

Faber was an NCAA wrestler. With his base in wrestling, he later added Brazilian jiu-jitsu to his arsenal and quickly earned a brown belt under Fábio "Pateta" Prado. Faber won the WEC featherweight championship at WEC 19 on March 17, 2006, and held the title for over two and a half years until losing it to Mike Brown at WEC 36 on November 5, 2008. He went on to challenge for the WEC featherweight championship two more times (against Brown and José Aldo), and after moving to the UFC, went on to challenge for the UFC Bantamweight Championship three times (once against Renan Barão, twice against Dominick Cruz).

Faber is widely regarded as one of MMA's pioneers for establishing legitimacy to lighter-weight classes. After his retirement on July 6, 2017, Faber was inducted into the UFC Hall of Fame as a part of the Modern-era wing. He came out of retirement in 2019 and defeated Ricky Simón by first-round TKO.

== Early life ==
Faber was born on May 14, 1979, in Isla Vista, California, to Theo and Suzanne Faber. He is of Dutch descent on his father's side, and Italian, English, and Irish on his mother's side. He went to Glen Edwards Middle School, Casa Roble High School and Lincoln High School. He has two siblings, Ryan and Michaella. Faber graduated from the University of California, Davis with a bachelor's degree in Human Development. While at UC-Davis, Faber qualified for the NCAA national wrestling tournament in 2001 and 2002.

== Mixed martial arts career ==
Faber made his professional MMA debut as part of the Gladiator Challenge promotion on November 12, 2003, defeating Poes Manne by a guillotine choke at 1:22 of round 1. Faber then defeated George Adkins by TKO (strikes) on February 12, 2004, earning a shot at GC Bantamweight champion, David Velasquez. On June 6, 2004, Faber defeated Velasquez by unanimous decision, becoming the new GC Bantamweight champion. In his first title defense, Faber defeated Del Hawkins by TKO (strikes) at 3:19 of the first round on August 19, 2004. After this fight, Faber began to take fights in both GC and King of the Cage, GC's parent promotion.

Upon moving to KOTC, Faber defeated Rami Boukai by majority decision on September 24, 2004, barely a month after his last fight. On November 14, 2004, Faber defeated Eben Kaneshiro by submission (strikes) to win the King of the Cage Bantamweight Championship, co-holding it with the GC Bantamweight title.

On March 13, 2005, Faber made his return to GC, defeating David Granados by rear naked choke at 2:13 of round 1. On May 7, 2005, he defended his KOTC belt for the first time, defeating Hiroyuki Abe by TKO (cut) at 2:37 of the third round. Returning to GC on September 10, 2005, Faber had his first defeat, losing the GC Bantamweight championship to Tyson Griffin by TKO (strikes) in the third round, in only five seconds.

On October 29, 2005, Faber defended his KOTC title again, defeating Shawn Bias by guillotine choke at 1:24 of the first round. He returned to GC on December 11, 2005, defeating Charles Bennett by rear-naked choke at 4:38 of round 1. Faber then fought at a TKO Major League MMA event on January 8, 2006, facing Ivan Menjivar. Faber won by disqualification at 2:02 of the second round when Menjivar landed an illegal kick to a downed Faber.

=== World Extreme Cagefighting ===
On March 17, 2006, Faber competed for the first time in the World Extreme Cagefighting promotion, beating Cole Escovedo by second-round doctors stoppage and winning the WEC Featherweight Championship. On May 13, 2006, he fought for the King of the Cage Bantamweight Championship for the third time, defeating Charlie Valencia by rear naked choke submission at 3:09 of the first round. Faber then returned to GC July 1, 2006, and defeated Naoya Uematsu by TKO (strikes) at 3:35 of round 2 to reclaim the GC Bantamweight championship, thus holding three titles at once. Faber then took a fight in the Full Contact Promotions organization on September 9, 2006, defeating Enoch Wilson by TKO (strikes) at 1:01 of the second round. On October 28, Faber returned to KOTC and defended his title for the fourth and last time, defeating future DREAM and ONE FC champion Bibiano Fernandes by TKO (cut) at 4:16 of round 1. Faber later vacated his KOTC and GC titles upon signing a contract with the WEC after it was purchased by Zuffa in December 2006.

At WEC 25: McCullough vs. Cope on January 20, 2007, Faber defended his WEC Featherweight Championship for the first time since winning it ten months prior, defeating Joe Pearson by submission (strikes) at 2:31 of the first round. At WEC 26: Condit vs. Alessio on March 24, 2007, he successfully defended his title for a second time by defeating Dominick Cruz by guillotine choke submission at 1:38 of round 1, the first of only four losses in Cruz's career.

At WEC 28: WrekCage on June 3, 2007, Faber defeated Chance Farrar by rear-naked choke submission at 3:19 of the first round. In his post-fight interview, Faber called out K-1 Hero's 2005 Middleweight Tournament Champion Norifumi Yamamoto, though the fight never materialized. After this match, Faber took a six-month break between fights, the longest of his career. He came back at WEC 31: Faber vs. Curran on December 12, 2007, defeating Jeff Curran by guillotine choke submission at 4:34 of the second round. Also on this card was the WEC debut of Jens Pulver, who was moving back down to featherweight from the lightweight division. In Pulver's WEC debut, he submitted Cub Swanson in the first round of their match setting up a title match between Pulver and Faber. Pulver and Faber both commented in their post-fight interviews that they wanted to fight each other, and the match was signed for June 1, 2008, at WEC 34: Faber vs. Pulver. Faber and Pulver fought a constant back-and-forth battle, but neither man was able to finish the other and the fight went the full five rounds, the first time in Faber's WEC career that one of his fights had gone the distance. The judges scored the bout a unanimous decision for Faber, (50–45, 50–44, and 50–44). This fight also marked both the first time that one of Pulver's fights at featherweight had gone to decision and the first time Pulver had been defeated at that weight class.

=== Losing the title ===
Faber was next scheduled to fight Mike Brown at WEC 36 on September 10, 2008, at the Seminole Hard Rock Hotel & Casino in Hollywood, Florida. However, this fight was postponed due to the threat of Hurricane Ike and was rescheduled for November 5, 2008, at the same location. Faber was defeated via TKO at 2:23 of the first round.

On January 25, 2009, at WEC 38 Faber fought Jens Pulver in a rematch, with Faber winning by guillotine choke submission at 1:34 of the first round. Post-fight, Faber addressed WEC Featherweight Champion Mike Brown, who was seated at ringside and announced he wanted a shot at regaining his title. When Brown made his first successful title defense at WEC 39 in Corpus Christi, Texas, he responded to Faber's comments by saying that a rematch between the two of them was something "the fans want to see."

Faber was defeated a second time by Mike Brown at WEC 41 on June 7, 2009, by a unanimous decision (49–46, 49–46, and 48–47) in front of his hometown crowd in Sacramento. Early in the fight, Faber broke his right hand and later dislocated his left thumb, resorting to using primarily elbows and kicks starting in the third round. Nonetheless, even in the fifth round, Faber threw 15 left hooks or jabs, many of which connected. Sherdog and ESPN.com in a post-fight article noted that Faber's "right hand was no match for the top of Mike Brown's head." Immediately after the fight, Faber stated that despite the close decision, he would still like another fight against Brown.

Faber appeared on WEC 43 as a guest commentator and returned to action in January. He submitted Brazilian jiu-jitsu black belt, Raphael Assunção via rear naked choke submission in third round at WEC 46, earning the Submission of the Night award.

With the victory over Assunção, Faber earned a shot to fight José Aldo for the WEC Featherweight Championship on April 24, 2010, at WEC 48. In the fight, he had no answer for the kicks from Aldo, which sent him to the canvas several times. Faber lost via unanimous decision.

=== Move to bantamweight ===
Faber decided to move down to bantamweight after his defeat by José Aldo at featherweight. He was set to move down against Japanese striker Takeya Mizugaki on August 18, 2010, at WEC 50. However, Faber was forced off the card with an injury. As a result, Mizugaki was also pulled from the event.

The bout with Mizugaki was rescheduled and took place on November 11, 2010, at WEC 52. Faber defeated Mizugaki via first round rear naked choke, earning Submission of the Night honors. With the victory over Mizugaki, Faber won his ninth WEC bout, a promotional record he shares with Antonio Banuelos and Poppies Martinez.

=== Ultimate Fighting Championship ===
On October 28, 2010, the WEC merged with the UFC. As part of the merger, all WEC fighters were brought over to compete in the two new weight divisions.

Faber made his promotional debut against former WEC Bantamweight Champion Eddie Wineland on March 19, 2011, at UFC 128. Faber won the back-and-forth fight via unanimous decision.

A rematch with Dominick Cruz, whose only defeat to that point came by Faber in 2007 took place on July 2, 2011, at UFC 132, in which Faber lost via unanimous decision. Both participants earned Fight of the Night honors.

Faber faced Brian Bowles on November 19, 2011, at UFC 139. It was said that the winner would be awarded with a title shot. Faber defeated Bowles via second round submission (guillotine choke), earning Submission of the Night honors.

Following his win at UFC 139, Faber was selected to be a coach on The Ultimate Fighter: Live opposite Dominick Cruz. Following the conclusion of the reality show, it was confirmed that Faber/Cruz III was expected to take place on July 7, 2012, at UFC 148. However, Cruz was forced to pull out of the bout citing ACL injury. It was then announced that Faber would remain on the UFC 148 fight card and face Renan Barão in a bout for the UFC Interim Bantamweight Championship, where the winner would go on to face Dominick Cruz for the UFC Undisputed Bantamweight Championship at a later date. However, due to an injury to headliner José Aldo, who was supposed to fight Erik Koch in the originally scheduled main event, the Faber/Barão bout was moved from UFC 148 on July 7, 2012, to UFC 149 on July 21, 2012, as the event's new main event. He lost the fight by unanimous decision, suffering a broken rib during the first round.

Faber faced Ivan Menjivar in a rematch on February 23, 2013, at UFC 157. Faber defeated Menjivar in the first round with a rear naked choke submission.

On April 13, 2013, Faber faced Scott Jorgensen at The Ultimate Fighter 17 Finale. After a fast-paced and technical fight, Faber submitted Jorgensen via rear-naked choke at 3:16 in the 4th round. In the ringside interview, Faber noted, "He knows my stuff, so it was a tough fight. He made one small technical error, and I was able to capitalize on it. Props to Scotty for being a great fighter."

Faber faced Iuri Alcântara on August 17, 2013, at UFC Fight Night 26. Despite being in trouble early in the first round, Faber recovered and used his wrestling and relentless top game, outstriking Alcântara 127 to 25 over the duration of the bout. As a result, Faber earned a unanimous decision victory.

Faber faced Michael McDonald on December 14, 2013, at UFC on Fox 9. In the second round, Faber stunned McDonald with a flurry of punches, McDonald went to the canvas and Faber jumped on him and finished the fight by submission due to a guillotine choke. Subsequently, Faber was awarded with Submission of the Night honors for his performance.

When Dominick Cruz injured himself before his unification bout with Renan Barão, Faber was chosen as the replacement in the title fight at UFC 169. Faber lost the fight via TKO in the first round. During the fight, Barão knocked Faber down, after which he proceeded to strike him on the ground. Faber grabbed Barão's leg, and gave the referee the thumbs-up, indicating that he wanted the fight to continue. The referee did not see the thumbs-up and stepped in to end the fight, to the surprise of Faber and the spectators. In his post-fight interview, he told Joe Rogan that he believed his teammate TJ Dillashaw should get the next crack at Barão.

Faber next faced Alex Caceres at UFC 175 on July 5, 2014. He won the fight via submission, making Caceres tap to a rear naked choke at 1:09 of the third round.

Faber was briefly linked to a bout with Masanori Kanehara on September 20, 2014, at UFC Fight Night 52. However, before the bout was officially announced, Faber was removed and Kanehara faced Alex Caceres.

Faber next faced Francisco Rivera on December 6, 2014, at UFC 181. Faber won the fight via second round submission. However, the ending was controversial, as Faber stunned Rivera with an eyepoke during a standup exchange. The eyepoke went unnoticed by the referee, but immediately preceded the fight ending submission. Rivera's management team indicated that they planned to appeal the result in hopes that it would be changed to a no contest, and that the UFC could schedule a rematch with Faber. Ultimately, the NSAC upheld the result of a submission victory for Faber.

A rematch with top contender Raphael Assunção was expected to headline UFC Fight Night 62 on March 21, 2015. However, Assunção was forced out of the bout as an ankle first injured in mid-December 2014 was slow to heal and that he was unable to resume the proper training to prepare for the fight in that time frame. Subsequently, the UFC removed Faber from the card, and he is expected to be rebooked, possibly against a new opponent at a different event.

A long speculated "superfight" with former UFC lightweight champion Frankie Edgar took place on May 16, 2015, at UFC Fight Night 66. After speculation as to what weight class the bout was to be contested, either featherweight, bantamweight or at a catchweight of somewhere in between, it was announced that the bout would be contested at featherweight. Faber lost the fight via unanimous decision, this was his first career loss in a non-title bout.

In mid 2015 Faber served as coach in UFC's The Ultimate Fighter show for a second time, this time coaching against Conor McGregor, with the pair not expected to fight at the end of the season. Faber's team member Ryan Hall ended up winning the competition.

Faber faced Frankie Saenz on December 12, 2015, at UFC 194. He won the back-and-forth fight by unanimous decision.

A rubber match with Dominick Cruz took place on June 4, 2016, at UFC 199 for the UFC Bantamweight Championship. He lost the fight via unanimous decision.

Faber next faced Jimmie Rivera on September 10, 2016, at UFC 203. He lost the fight via unanimous decision.

==== Final fight and retirement ====
In October 2016, Faber announced that his next fight, a bout against Brad Pickett on December 17, 2016, at UFC on Fox 22 in his home town of Sacramento would be his last. Faber went on to win the fight by unanimous decision. After the conclusion of the bout, Faber confirmed his retirement from the sport after a 13-year career.

==== 2019 return ====
After two-and-a half years away from mixed martial arts competition, Faber made his return to the Octagon as he faced Ricky Simón on July 13, 2019, at UFC Fight Night 155. He won the bout via TKO in the first round, becoming the second fighter to win a UFC bout after being inducted to the UFC Hall of Fame. This win earned him the Performance of the Night award. After the fight, Faber signed a new contract with the UFC.

Faber faced Petr Yan on December 14, 2019, at UFC 245. He lost via knockout in the third round.

Despite not competing in over five years, on January 7, 2025, it was reported that Faber was removed from the UFC roster.

=== Global Fight League ===
Faber was scheduled to return to MMA competition after over five years in his debut with the Global Fight League to compete in his third bout against Renan Barão on May 24, 2025 in the main event at GFL 1. However, the first two GFL events were postponed indefinitely.

== Team Alpha Male ==
See Team Alpha Male

== Grappling career ==
In December 2021, Faber agreed on short notice to compete in his first Combat Jiu-Jitsu match against a CJJ world champion Elias Anderson, at the Featherweight edition of the CJJ world championships., but passport issues led to Faber being replaced by Erik Perez, who lost to Anderson. The match between Anderson and Faber was then re-booked for Combat Jiu-Jitsu Worlds Team Duel on December 18, 2022. Neither man was able to win regulation time and Faber lost by armbar in EBI overtime.

Faber returned to wrestling competition at the 2022 US Open alongside his teammate Clay Guida, coming away with a silver medal at the event.

Faber was scheduled to compete in a rematch against Jeff Curran under Combat Jiu-Jitsu rules at A1 Combat 21 on May 25, 2024. Curran withdrew from the match due to undisclosed reasons and was replaced by Jeff Glover. Faber won the match by submission with a rear-naked choke.

Faber faced Bibiano Fernandes in the main event of ADXC 5 on August 3, 2024. He won the match by decision.

== Freestyle wrestling ==
Faber faced Henry Cejudo at RAF 06 on February 28, 2026 in the main event and lost by technical fall (11–0).

Faber faced Arman Tsarukyan at RAF 08 on April 18, 2026 in the main event and lost by technical fall (13–1). The bout was moved to the main event after Cejudo pulled out of his scheduled bout due to injury.

Faber was originally scheduled to face former UFC Bantamweight Championship challenger Umar Nurmagomedov in a catchweight bout, but Nurmagomedov was removed from the card and replaced by Saba Lazishvili. Faber lost the bout by decision.

== Personal life ==
Faber and Jaslyn Ome have two children: daughter Cali(March 14, 2019) and son Rome (October 8, 2020).

Despite these photographs being released, the two did not marry; this was a photoshoot for Taber Ranch, a wedding venue in Sacramento, California.

== Championships and accomplishments ==
- Ultimate Fighting Championship
  - UFC Hall of Fame (Modern Wing, Class of 2017)
  - Fight of the Night (One time) vs. Dominick Cruz
  - Performance of the Night (One time) vs. Ricky Simón
  - Submission of the Night (Two times) vs. Brian Bowles and Michael McDonald
  - Tied (Rob Font, Sean O'Malley & Song Yadong) for third most finishes in UFC Bantamweight division history (7)
  - Tied (Rani Yahya) for most submissions in UFC Bantamweight division history (6)
  - Tied (Rob Font) for sixth most wins in UFC Bantamweight division history (11)
  - Tied (T.J. Dillashaw) for sixth most bouts in UFC Bantamweight division history (17)
  - UFC.com Awards
    - 2011: Ranked #5 Import of the Year & Ranked #4 Fight of the Year vs. Dominick Cruz 2
    - 2013: Ranked #4 Fighter of the Year & Ranked #7 Submissions of the Year vs. Ivan Menjivar, Scott Jorgensen & Michael McDonald
- World Extreme Cagefighting
  - WEC Featherweight Championship (One time)
    - Five successful title defenses
  - Fight of the Night (three times) vs. Jeff Curran, Jens Pulver, and Mike Brown
  - Knockout of the Night (one time) vs. Joe Pearson
  - Submission of the Night (four times) vs. Dominick Cruz, Jens Pulver, Raphael Assunção, and Takeya Mizugaki
  - Most Post-Fight bonuses in WEC History (8)
  - Most consecutive title defenses in WEC history (five)
  - Most successful title defenses in WEC history (five)
- King of the Cage
  - KOTC Bantamweight Championship (One time)
  - Five successful title defenses
- Gladiator Challenge
  - GC Bantamweight Championship (Two Times)
- MMA Insider
  - 2013 Fight Camp of the Year (Team Alpha Male)
- World MMA Awards
  - 2013 Submission of the Year vs. Ivan Menjivar at UFC 157
- Sherdog
  - 2011 All-Violence First Team
  - 2013 All-Violence First Team
- Bleacher Report
  - 2013 #4 Ranked Fighter of the Year

== Mixed martial arts record ==
Professional record breakdown
46 matches	35 wins	11 losses
By knockout	10	4
By submission	17	0
By decision	7	7
By disqualification	1	0

Res.	Record	Opponent	Method	Event	Date	Round	Time	Location	Notes
Loss	35–11	Petr Yan	KO (head kick)	UFC 245	December 14, 2019	3	0:43	Las Vegas, Nevada, United States	
Win	35–10	Ricky Simón	TKO (punches)	UFC Fight Night: de Randamie vs. Ladd	July 13, 2019	1	0:46	Sacramento, California, United States	Performance of the Night.
Win	34–10	Brad Pickett	Decision (unanimous)	UFC on Fox: VanZant vs. Waterson	December 17, 2016	3	5:00	Sacramento, California, United States	
Loss	33–10	Jimmie Rivera	Decision (unanimous)	UFC 203	September 10, 2016	3	5:00	Cleveland, Ohio, United States	
Loss	33–9	Dominick Cruz	Decision (unanimous)	UFC 199	June 4, 2016	5	5:00	Inglewood, California, United States	For the UFC Bantamweight Championship.
Win	33–8	Frankie Saenz	Decision (unanimous)	UFC 194	December 12, 2015	3	5:00	Las Vegas, Nevada, United States	
Loss	32–8	Frankie Edgar	Decision (unanimous)	UFC Fight Night: Edgar vs. Faber	May 16, 2015	5	5:00	Pasay, Philippines	Featherweight bout.
Win	32–7	Francisco Rivera	Submission (bulldog choke)	UFC 181	December 6, 2014	2	1:34	Las Vegas, Nevada, United States	
Win	31–7	Alex Caceres	Submission (rear naked choke)	UFC 175	July 5, 2014	3	1:09	Las Vegas, Nevada, United States	
Loss	30–7	Renan Barão	TKO (punches)	UFC 169	February 1, 2014	1	3:42	Newark, New Jersey, United States	For the UFC Bantamweight Championship.
Win	30–6	Michael McDonald	Submission (guillotine choke)	UFC on Fox: Johnson vs. Benavidez 2	December 14, 2013	2	3:22	Sacramento, California, United States	Submission of the Night.
Win	29–6	Iuri Alcântara	Decision (unanimous)	UFC Fight Night: Shogun vs. Sonnen	August 17, 2013	3	5:00	Boston, Massachusetts, United States	
Win	28–6	Scott Jorgensen	Submission (rear-naked choke)	The Ultimate Fighter: Team Jones vs. Team Sonnen Finale	April 13, 2013	4	3:16	Las Vegas, Nevada, United States	
Win	27–6	Ivan Menjivar	Submission (standing rear-naked choke)	UFC 157	February 23, 2013	1	4:34	Anaheim, California, United States	
Loss	26–6	Renan Barão	Decision (unanimous)	UFC 149	July 21, 2012	5	5:00	Calgary, Alberta, Canada	For the interim UFC Bantamweight Championship.
Win	26–5	Brian Bowles	Submission (guillotine choke)	UFC 139	November 19, 2011	2	1:27	San Jose, California, United States	UFC Bantamweight title eliminator. Submission of the Night.
Loss	25–5	Dominick Cruz	Decision (unanimous)	UFC 132	July 2, 2011	5	5:00	Las Vegas, Nevada, United States	For the UFC Bantamweight Championship. Fight of the Night.
Win	25–4	Eddie Wineland	Decision (unanimous)	UFC 128	March 19, 2011	3	5:00	Newark, New Jersey, United States	
Win	24–4	Takeya Mizugaki	Technical Submission (rear-naked choke)	WEC 52	November 11, 2010	1	4:50	Las Vegas, Nevada, United States	Return to Bantamweight. Submission of the Night.
Loss	23–4	José Aldo	Decision (unanimous)	WEC 48	April 24, 2010	5	5:00	Sacramento, California, United States	For the WEC Featherweight Championship.
Win	23–3	Raphael Assunção	Submission (rear-naked choke)	WEC 46	January 10, 2010	3	3:49	Sacramento, California, United States	Submission of the Night.
Loss	22–3	Mike Brown	Decision (unanimous)	WEC 41	June 7, 2009	5	5:00	Sacramento, California, United States	For the WEC Featherweight Championship. Fight of the Night.
Win	22–2	Jens Pulver	Submission (guillotine choke)	WEC 38	January 25, 2009	1	1:34	San Diego, California, United States	Submission of the Night.
Loss	21–2	Mike Brown	TKO (punches)	WEC 36	November 5, 2008	1	2:23	Hollywood, Florida, United States	Lost the WEC Featherweight Championship.
Win	21–1	Jens Pulver	Decision (unanimous)	WEC 34	June 1, 2008	5	5:00	Sacramento, California, United States	Defended the WEC Featherweight Championship. Fight of the Night.
Win	20–1	Jeff Curran	Submission (guillotine choke)	WEC 31	December 12, 2007	2	4:34	Las Vegas, Nevada, United States	Defended the WEC Featherweight Championship. Fight of the Night.
Win	19–1	Chance Farrar	Submission (rear-naked choke)	WEC 28	June 3, 2007	1	3:19	Las Vegas, Nevada, United States	Defended the WEC Featherweight Championship.
Win	18–1	Dominick Cruz	Submission (guillotine choke)	WEC 26	March 24, 2007	1	1:38	Las Vegas, Nevada, United States	Defended the WEC Featherweight Championship. Submission of the Night.
Win	17–1	Joe Pearson	TKO (punches and elbows)	WEC 25	January 20, 2007	1	2:31	Las Vegas, Nevada, United States	Defended the WEC Featherweight Championship. Knockout of the Night.
Win	16–1	Bibiano Fernandes	TKO (doctor stoppage)	KOTC: All Stars	October 28, 2006	1	4:16	Reno, Nevada, United States	Defended the KOTC Bantamweight Championship.
Win	15–1	Enoch Wilson	TKO (doctor stoppage)	FCP: Malice at Cow Palace	September 9, 2006	2	1:01	San Francisco, California, United States	
Win	14–1	Naoya Uematsu	TKO (punches)	GC 51: Madness at the Memorial	July 1, 2006	2	3:35	Sacramento, California, United States	Won the GC Bantamweight Championship.
Win	13–1	Charlie Valencia	Submission (rear-naked choke)	KOTC: Predator	May 13, 2006	1	3:09	Globe, Arizona, United States	Defended the KOTC Bantamweight Championship.
Win	12–1	Cole Escovedo	TKO (corner stoppage)	WEC 19	March 17, 2006	2	5:00	Lemoore, California, United States	Won the WEC Featherweight Championship.
Win	11–1	Ivan Menjivar	DQ (illegal kick to downed opponent)	TKO 24: Eruption	January 28, 2006	2	2:02	Laval, Quebec, Canada	Featherweight debut.
Win	10–1	Charles Bennett	Technical Submission (rear-naked choke)	GC 46: Avalanche	December 11, 2005	1	4:38	Coarsegold, California, United States	Defended the KOTC Bantamweight Championship.
Win	9–1	Shawn Bias	Submission (standing guillotine choke)	KOTC: Execution Day	October 29, 2005	1	1:24	Reno, Nevada, United States	Defended the KOTC Bantamweight Championship.
Loss	8–1	Tyson Griffin	TKO (punches)	GC 42: Summer Slam	September 10, 2005	3	0:05	Lakeport, California, United States	Lost the GC Bantamweight Championship.
Win	8–0	Hiroyuki Abe	TKO (doctor stoppage)	KOTC: Mortal Sins	May 7, 2005	3	2:37	Primm, Nevada, United States	Defended the KOTC Bantamweight Championship.
Win	7–0	David Granados	Submission (rear-naked choke)	GC 35: Cold Fury	March 13, 2005	1	2:13	Porterville, California, United States	
Win	6–0	Eben Kaneshiro	TKO (punches)	KOTC 44: Revenge	November 14, 2004	3	4:33	San Jacinto, California, United States	Won the vacant KOTC Bantamweight Championship.
Win	5–0	Rami Boukai	Decision (majority)	KOTC 41: Relentless	September 29, 2004	2	5:00	San Jacinto, California, United States	
Win	4–0	Del Hawkins	TKO (punches)	GC 30: Gladiator Challenge 30	August 19, 2004	1	3:19	Colusa, California, United States	
Win	3–0	David Velasquez	Decision (unanimous)	GC 27: FightFest 2	June 3, 2004	3	5:00	Colusa, California, United States	Won the GC Bantamweight Championship.
Win	2–0	George Adkins	TKO (corner stoppage)	GC 22: Gladiator Challenge 22	February 12, 2004	2	2:42	Colusa, California, United States	
Win	1–0	Jay Valencia	Submission (guillotine choke)	GC 20: Gladiator Challenge 20	November 12, 2003	1	1:22	Colusa, California, United States	

== Pay-Per-View Bouts ==
No.	Event	Fight	Date	Venue	City	PPV Buys
1.	WEC 48	Aldo vs. Faber	April 24, 2010	ARCO Arena	Sacramento, California, United States	175,000
2.	UFC 132	Cruz vs. Faber 2	July 2, 2011	MGM Grand Garden Arena	Las Vegas, Nevada, United States	350,000
3.	UFC 149	Faber vs. Barão	July 21, 2012	Scotiabank Saddledome	Calgary, Alberta, Canada	235,000
4	UFC 169	Barão vs. Faber 2	February 1, 2014	Prudential Center	Newark, New Jersey, United States	230,000

== Filmography ==
Year	Title	Role	Notes
2010	The MMAX (MMA-XTRA)	MMA Expert/Contributor	2010 TV series
2011	Kenny Powers: The K-Swiss MFCEO	Himself	Short film
2011	Leverage	Roper	2008 TV series (Episode: "The Carnival Job")
2011	Cagefighter	Himself	Documentary
2015	Reach Me	Student	Feature Film
2018	Rampage	Garrick	Feature Film

== See also ==
- List of current UFC fighters
- List of male mixed martial artists

Awards and achievements
Preceded by Cole Escovedo	2nd WEC Featherweight Champion; March 17, 2006 – November 5, 2008	Succeeded by Mike Brown
