= Reuben Duran =

American mixed martial artist

- Born: July 2, 1983 (age 43); Chula Vista, California, United States
- Other names: Hurricane
- Nationality: American
- Height: 5 ft 6 in (1.68 m)
- Weight: 135 lb (61 kg; 9.6 st)
- Division: Bantamweight; Flyweight
- Reach: 71.0 in (180 cm)
- Fighting out of: Redlands, California, United States
- Team: Pinnacle Jiu Jitsu & MMA
- Years active: 2006–present

Mixed martial arts record
- Total: 16
- Wins: 10
- By knockout: 4
- By submission: 4
- By decision: 2
- Losses: 5
- By knockout: 1
- By submission: 1
- By decision: 3
- Draws: 1

Other information
- Mixed martial arts record from Sherdog

Reuben Duran (born July 2, 1983) is an American professional mixed martial artist currently competing in the Flyweight division. A professional since 2006, he has competed for the UFC, Shooto, and King of the Cage. He is the current King of the Cage Light Flyweight Champion, as well as the former Interim Flyweight Champion.

== Background ==
Duran started training martial arts at the age of seven. By the time he turned 14 he had added boxing to training regimen and by 19 was training in all aspects of MMA including the additions of wrestling, Brazilian jiu-jitsu, and Muay Thai.

== Mixed martial arts career ==
=== Early career ===
Reuben began his career with multiple fights for King of the Cage, and other small promotions in California. As an amateur competitor, Duran has distinguished himself by being a six time winner of Grapplers Quest.

In a memorable match, Duran fought Greg Guzman, hiding his injuries that included 2 torn ligaments in his right hand. In spite of the injuries, Duran still earned the victory. Later, in an interview, Duran voiced his confidence that were it not for the injury, he would have gotten a stoppage. Duran would support his bold statement in his next fight as he claimed a victory over Ryan Diaz via KO with only 3 seconds left in the fight. In subsequent bouts, Duran submitted both Kana Hyatt and Maurice Eazel in the first round.

=== Ultimate Fighting Championship ===
Duran signed with the UFC in early 2011 and made his debut at UFC on Versus 3 against Takeya Mizugaki, replacing an injured Francisco Rivera. Duran lost the fight via close split decision.

Duran faced Francisco Rivera on June 4, 2011 at The Ultimate Fighter 13 Finale. He won the fight via submission in the third round, earning Submission of the Night honors.

Duran next faced Hugo Viana on December 15, 2012 at The Ultimate Fighter: Team Carwin vs. Team Nelson Finale. After being knocked down twice, he eventually lost the fight via KO late in the first round.

Duran then faced George Roop on March 16, 2013 at UFC 158. He lost the fight via unanimous decision and was subsequently released from the promotion.

=== Post-UFC career ===
Over a year after his release from UFC, Duran returned to King of the Cage in June 2014. Duran faced Tony Sanchez at KOTC: Slugfest on June 5, 2014. He won the fight via second round TKO.

== Championships and accomplishments ==
- King of the Cage
  - Interim KOTC Flyweight Championship (One time)
  - KOTC Flyweight Championship (One time)
  - KOTC Light Flyweight Championship (One time; current)

== Mixed martial arts record ==
Professional record breakdown
21 matches	13 wins	7 losses
By knockout	4	2
By submission	5	1
By decision	4	4
Draws	1	

Res.	Record	Opponent	Method	Event	Date	Round	Time	Location	Notes
Won	13–7–1	Tim Sosa	Submission (rear naked choke)	KOTC: Energetic Pursuit	February 24, 2018	5	4:08	Ontario, California United States	Won the KOTC Light Flyweight Championship.
Won	12–7–1	Fard Muhammad	Decision (unanimous)	KOTC: Conquistadores	December 3, 2017	3	5:00	Ontario, California United States	
Loss	11–7–1	Shoko Sato	KO/TKO (strikes)	Shooto in Korakuen Hall	July 23, 2017	1	4:58	Tokyo, Japan	
Loss	11–6–1	Derrick Mandell	Decision (split)	KOTC: Ultimate Collision	July 8, 2016	5	5:00	Carlton, Minnesota, United States	Lost the KOTC Flyweight Championship.
Win	11–5–1	Andrew Natividad	Decision (unanimous)	KOTC: Bitter Rivals	August 29, 2015	5	5:00	Ontario, California, United States	Defended the interim KOTC Flyweight Championship. Later promoted to undisputed champion.
Win	10–5–1	Eduardo Torres	Decision (unanimous)	KOTC: Battle for the Belt	October 2, 2014	5	5:00	Highland, California, United States	Won the interim KOTC Flyweight Championship.
Win	9–5–1	Tony Sanchez	TKO (punches)	KOTC: Slugfest	June 5, 2014	2	1:26	Highland, California, United States	
Loss	8–5–1	George Roop	Decision (unanimous)	UFC 158	March 16, 2013	3	5:00	Montreal, Quebec, Canada	
Loss	8–4–1	Hugo Viana	KO (punch)	The Ultimate Fighter 16 Finale	December 15, 2012	1	4:05	Las Vegas, Nevada, United States	
Win	8–3–1	Francisco Rivera	Submission (rear-naked choke)	The Ultimate Fighter 13 Finale	June 4, 2011	3	1:57	Las Vegas, Nevada, United States	Submission of the Night.
Loss	7–3–1	Takeya Mizugaki	Decision (split)	UFC Live: Sanchez vs. Kampmann	March 3, 2011	3	5:00	Louisville, Kentucky, United States	
Win	7–2–1	Kana Hyatt	Submission (guillotine choke)	KOTC: Sniper	August 5, 2010	1	2:03	San Bernardino, California, United States	
Win	6–2–1	Maurice Eazel	Submission (guillotine choke)	Long Beach Fight Night 8	April 18, 2010	1	1:18	Long Beach, California, United States	
Win	5–2–1	Ryan Diaz	KO (punch)	KOTC: Arrival	February 25, 2010	3	4:57	Highland, California, United States	
Win	4–2–1	Greg Guzman	Decision (unanimous)	KOTC: Super Stars	August 13, 2009	3	5:00	Highland, California, United States	
Loss	3–2–1	Tommy Vargas	Decision (unanimous)	All Star Boxing: Conquest in the Cage 3	July 10, 2009	3	3:00	Montebello, California, United States	
Win	3–1–1	Manny Romero	TKO (punches)	AF 2: Apocalypse Fights 2	October 9, 2008	1	0:37	Palm Springs, California, United States	
Win	2–1–1	Ricardo Gallardo	KO (punches)	AF: Apocalypse Fights 1	August 7, 2008	1	N/A	Palm Springs, California, United States	
Win	1–1–1	Bobby Sanchez	Submission (triangle choke)	Invincible: MMA	March 8, 2008	1	1:15	Ontario, California, United States	
Draw	0–1–1	David Aguirre	Draw	KOTC: Final Chapter	December 2, 2007	2	5:00	San Jacinto, California, United States	
Loss	0–1	Scott Epstein	Submission (rear-naked choke)	PF 1: The Beginning	May 12, 2006	1	2:40	Hollywood, California, United States	
