= T.J. Dillashaw =

American mixed martial artist (born 1986)

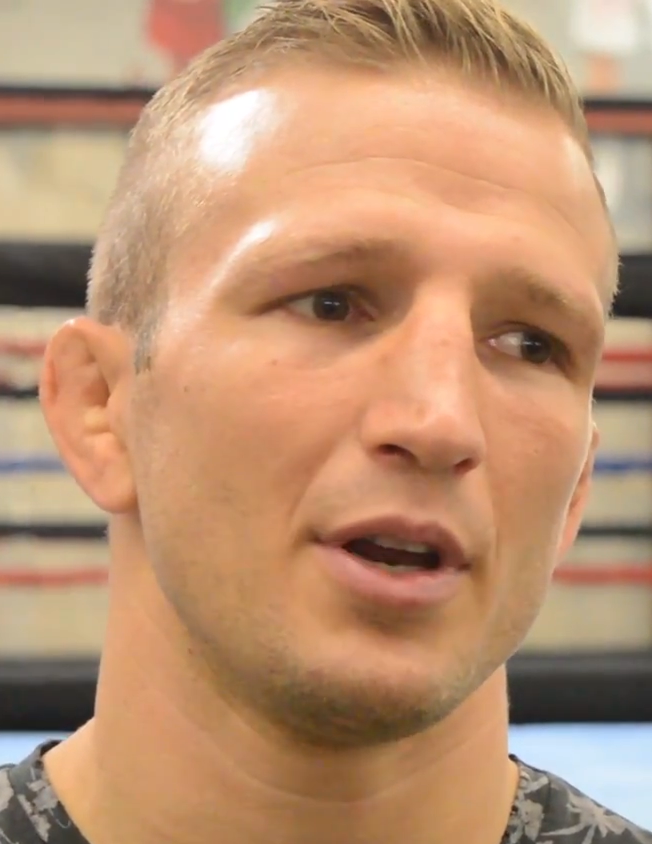
- Born: Tyler Jeffrey Dillashaw; February 7, 1986 (age 40); Sonora, California, U.S.
- Height: 5 ft 6 in (168 cm)
- Weight: 135 lb (61 kg; 9 st 9 lb)
- Division: Flyweight (125 lbs) (2019); Bantamweight (135 lbs) (2010–2018, 2021–2022)
- Reach: 67 in (170 cm)
- Fighting out of: Denver, Colorado, U.S.
- Team: Ludwig Martial Arts; Team Alpha Male (2009–2015); Elevation Fight Team (2015–2017); Treigning Lab (2017–present); Huntington Beach Ultimate Training Center (2018–present)
- Trainer: Duane Ludwig (head coach, kickboxing); Mark Muñoz (wrestling); Sam Calavitta (strength and conditioning); Philipe "Furão" Della Monica (Brazilian Jiu-Jitsu)
- Rank: Black belt in Bang Muay Thai under Duane Ludwig; Purple belt in Brazilian Jiu-Jitsu under Philipe "Furão" Della Monica
- Wrestling: NCAA Division I Wrestling
- Years active: 2010–2022

Mixed martial arts record
- Total: 22
- Wins: 17
- By knockout: 8
- By submission: 3
- By decision: 6
- Losses: 5
- By knockout: 3
- By decision: 2

Other information
- University: California State University, Fullerton
- Website: tjdillashaw.com
- Mixed martial arts record from Sherdog

YouTube information
- Channel: TjDillashaw
- Subscribers: 48 thousand
- Views: 2.2 million
- Last updated: January 17, 2026

Tyler Jeffrey Dillashaw (born February 7, 1986) is an American former professional mixed martial artist who competed in the Ultimate Fighting Championship (UFC), where he is a former two-time UFC Bantamweight Champion.

Dillashaw competed on the 2011 Ultimate Fighter season. In 2014, he won the UFC Bantamweight Championship by dethroning Renan Barão, who was on a 32-fight unbeaten streak. Dillashaw lost the title to Dominick Cruz by split decision in 2016 before regaining it against Cody Garbrandt in 2017. He was later stripped of the belt in 2019 after testing positive for a banned substance, erythropoietin, in the drug tests for his UFC Flyweight Championship bout against Henry Cejudo. He received a two-year suspension and made his comeback in 2021, challenging for the bantamweight championship again in 2022 before retiring.

== Early life ==
Dillashaw was born in Sonora, California, to Hal and Janice Dillashaw. He grew up in Angels Camp, California, alongside his two brothers Justin and KC with KC being the oldest one out of the three.

== Wrestling ==
=== High school ===
While wrestling for Coach Jan Schulz at Bret Harte High School, Dillashaw was a four-time sectional qualifier and two-time California Interscholastic Federation (CIF) state qualifier. As a junior, Dillashaw placed fifth at the CIF state championships, and ended the season with a record of 45–7. He placed second at the CIF State championships as a senior to cap off a 52–6 record and finished with an overall record of 170–33.

=== Collegiate ===
With a successful high school career, Dillashaw received a full-ride scholarship to wrestle for Cal State Fullerton Titans. In the 2005–06 season, Dillashaw's freshman year, he posted a 14–16 record including a 10–8 mark in dual matches. He went 3–4 in Pac-10 dual meets. Dillashaw traveled to Ukraine in the summer of 2006 to work on his wrestling skills. Dillashaw's sophomore season was a more successful one having an overall record of 17–14 with an 11–4 mark in duals, including 5–3 in the Pac-10. In April 2007, he placed sixth in the University Greco Wrestling Championships in Akron, Ohio, at 132.25 pounds. In total, Dillashaw was a three-time NCAA Division I National Qualifier at Cal State Fullerton.

== Mixed martial arts career ==
After graduating from California State University, Fullerton in 2009 with a Bachelor of Science in kinesiology, Dillashaw contemplated starting a career in MMA. While competing in the UFC's middleweight division, MMA fighter Mark Muñoz was coaching at Fullerton and met Dillashaw, inviting him to join his Reign Training Center fighter class at the conclusion of his senior year. After training with Team Reign for a year and a half, Muñoz encouraged Dillashaw to move up north closer to his hometown of Angels Camp, CA to train with Team Alpha Male in Sacramento. While training there, Dillashaw collected a 2–0 amateur record before turning pro.

On March 26, 2010, Dillashaw made his professional debut against fellow pro debutant, Czar Sklavos. Dillashaw used his superior wrestling to earn a dominant unanimous decision win. Two months later, Dillashaw returned to fight Brandon Drucker, winning the fight via first round submission. The fight took place at Fight For Wrestling, an MMA event located in California attempting to raise money to fund the Cal Poly wrestling team.

=== The Ultimate Fighter ===
In 2011, Dillashaw signed with the Ultimate Fighting Championship to compete on The Ultimate Fighter: Team Bisping vs. Team Miller. In the first episode, he fought Matt Jaggers to gain entry into the Ultimate Fighter house. Dillashaw defeated Jaggers in the first round by TKO.

Dillashaw was selected as part of Team Bisping, the second bantamweight chosen for the team (seventh overall). Dillashaw defeated Roland Delorme via rear naked choke submission in the preliminary round and moved onto the semi-finals. It was there he fought Dustin Pague for the first spot in the bantamweight final on the finale card. Dillashaw dominated Pague, grinding out three tough rounds to win the fight via unanimous decision (30–26, 30–27, 30–26).

=== Ultimate Fighting Championship ===
Dillashaw officially made his UFC debut on December 3, 2011, in Las Vegas, Nevada, at The Ultimate Fighter 14 Finale. The fight was the final of the bantamweight tournament against John Dodson to determine the winner of The Ultimate Fighter 14. Dillashaw lost via TKO in the first round.

Dillashaw's sophomore outing came on February 15, 2012, at UFC on Fuel TV 1 against Walel Watson. Dillashaw dominated Watson using his superior wrestling to control him on the ground, while nearly ending the fight several times with multiple submission attempts. Dillashaw won the bout via unanimous decision (30–25, 30–25, 30–26).

Dillashaw fought Vaughan Lee on July 11, 2012, at UFC on Fuel TV: Munoz vs. Weidman. He won the fight by submission via a standing neck crank in the first round.

Dillashaw was expected to face Mike Easton on December 8, 2012, at UFC on Fox 5. However, Dillashaw was forced out of the bout with an injury and replaced by Bryan Caraway.

Dillashaw faced Issei Tamura on March 16, 2013, at UFC 158. Dillashaw won via knock-out 26 seconds into the second round.

Dillashaw faced Hugo Viana on April 20, 2013, at UFC on Fox 7, replacing an injured Francisco Rivera. He won the fight via TKO in round one.

Dillashaw was briefly linked to a bout with Raphael Assunção on September 4, 2013, at UFC Fight Night 28. The fight was delayed due to Assunção suffering a minor medical issue.

The bout was rescheduled and took place on October 9, 2013, at UFC Fight Night 29. Assunção defeated Dillashaw via split decision. 10 out of 13 media outlets scored the bout for Dillashaw. The back and forth action earned both the participants Fight of the Night honors.

Dillashaw faced Mike Easton on January 15, 2014, at UFC Fight Night 35. He won the fight via unanimous decision.

==== First Bantamweight Championship Reign ====
Dillashaw was expected to face Takeya Mizugaki on May 24, 2014, at UFC 173. However, with the show losing its main event, Dillashaw was moved up the card to face Bantamweight champion and top 5 pound for pound Renan Barão in the featured bout. Dillashaw was an 8 to 1 underdog entering the bout. In one of the biggest upsets in UFC and MMA history, Dillashaw won the fight in dominant fashion, defeating Barão via TKO in the fifth round to become the new UFC Bantamweight champion. In addition to winning the title, Dillashaw received bonuses for Fight of the Night and Performance of the Night.

While interviewing Dillashaw after the fight, Joe Rogan said:

That was the greatest performance I have ever seen in my life!… You surpassed all expectations tonight with this performance. This was just … stunning…. This was incredible .... T.J., this is one of the finest performances I have ever seen. The best performance—I’ll say it right now—this is the most spectacular performance I have ever seen against a guy in Barão who is easily one of the best pound-for-pound fighters on the planet. Congratulations on just a masterful work tonight. It was an honor calling this fight. Thank you very much, brother.

An immediate rematch with Barão was scheduled to take place on August 30, 2014, at UFC 177. However, the day of the weigh-ins, Barão had to be admitted to the hospital as a result of his attempts to cut weight and was replaced by Joe Soto who was already scheduled to compete in a fight on the event's preliminary card. Dillashaw defeated Soto via knockout in the fifth round. The win also earned Dillashaw his second consecutive Performance of the Night bonus award.

A rematch with Barão was rescheduled and was expected to take place on April 25, 2015, at UFC 186. However a month before the event, Dillashaw was forced out of the bout after sustaining a broken rib while training.

The rematch eventually took place at UFC on Fox 16 on July 25, 2015. Dillashaw won the fight via TKO in the fourth round to retain his title. He also earned a Performance of the Night bonus.

Dillashaw faced former champion Dominick Cruz on January 17, 2016, at UFC Fight Night 81 He lost the bout and the title via split decision. Both participants were awarded Fight of the Night honors.

==== Road back to the title ====
A rematch with Raphael Assunção took place on July 9, 2016, at UFC 200. He won the fight via unanimous decision.

Dillashaw faced John Lineker on December 30, 2016, at UFC 207. He won via a dominant unanimous decision, wherein the bout was scored a 30–26 in favour of Dillashaw by all three judges.

==== Coaching The Ultimate Fighter and regaining the title ====
In January 2017, the UFC announced that Dillashaw would be one of the coaches, opposite current UFC Bantamweight champion (and former Team Alpha Male teammate) Cody Garbrandt on The Ultimate Fighter 25, with the pairing expected to face each other on July 8, 2017, at UFC 213. However the bout was scrapped on May 23 after Garbrandt sustained a back injury. The bout was rescheduled and eventually took place on November 4, 2017, at UFC 217. Dillashaw won the fight via knockout in the second round to regain the UFC Bantamweight Championship. This win also earned Dillashaw his fifth Performance of the Night bonus award.

Dillashaw faced Cody Garbrandt in a rematch for the UFC Bantamweight Championship on August 4, 2018, at UFC 227. He defeated Garbrandt in the first round by way of TKO. This win earned him the Performance of the Night award.

==== Fight with Henry Cejudo ====
Dillashaw was initially scheduled to face Henry Cejudo on January 26, 2019, at UFC 233 for the UFC Flyweight Championship. However, after that pay-per-view event was cancelled, the fight was moved a week earlier to headline UFC Fight Night 143 on January 19, 2019. Dillashaw lost the fight via TKO just 32 seconds into the first round.

==== Doping ban and relinquishment of Bantamweight title ====
On March 20, 2019, Dillashaw announced that he would be voluntarily relinquishing the UFC bantamweight championship after USADA and the New York State Athletic Commission (NYSAC) found adverse findings following his bout against Henry Cejudo. Dillashaw received a 12-month suspension from the NYSAC, retroactive to January 19, 2019, the date of his bout against Cejudo. On April 9, it was announced Dilllashaw had been suspended for two years by USADA (an additional suspension to what was given by the NYSAC) due to testing positive for recombinant human erythropoietin (rHuEPO, a synthetic form of EPO) prior to the Henry Cejudo bout. He became eligible to return on January 19, 2021.

On April 12, Dillashaw broke his silence over the drug test failure and UFC suspension with a post on Instagram, acknowledging that he had used a banned substance and stated that the decision was his alone, and that what he "really [felt] bad about" was the bad light he brought upon his coaches, family and teammates by association. He also said his use of EPO was limited to the Cejudo fight and said that USADA had retested all of the samples from his prior drug tests to confirm this.

==== Return from suspension ====
After the two-year hiatus due to his USADA suspension, Dillashaw was scheduled to face Cory Sandhagen on May 8, 2021, at UFC on ESPN 24. However, Dillashaw announced on April 27 that he had to pull out of the fight due to a cut he received from a headbutt in training. The pair was rescheduled and served as the main headliner for UFC on ESPN: Sandhagen vs. Dillashaw on July 24, 2021. Dillashaw won the fight via split decision. The decision was seen as somewhat controversial, with many fans, fighters, and media members expressing their belief that Sandhagen won the bout. 17 of 23 media outlets scored the bout as a victory for Sandhagen. During the fight, Dillashaw suffered a knee injury which kept him out of action over the next year.

Dillashaw faced Aljamain Sterling for the UFC Bantamweight Championship on October 22, 2022, at UFC 280, attempting to become UFC champion for a record-tying third time. Dillashaw, who was hampered by a dislocated shoulder from early on in the bout, lost the fight via technical knockout in round two. In his post-fight speech, Dillashaw admitted that he had come into the fight with an ongoing shoulder problem, saying "I probably dislocated it 20 times in training camp."

On December 5, 2022, Dillashaw was removed from the UFC roster after deciding to retire from MMA.

== Personal life ==
Dillashaw married Rebecca, in June 2014. In October 2015, Dillashaw left Team Alpha Male and moved his camp to Denver, Colorado, to train with his head coach, former UFC fighter Duane Ludwig. It was later confirmed that Dillashaw had left Team Alpha Male as a result of a number of disagreements, and accusations of injuring teammates on a number of occasions in training. Accusations included forcing promising Ultimate Fighter winner, Chris Holdsworth (6-0), to retire at the age of 27 due to concussions sustained from Dillashaw using illegal knees on a downed opponent during practice. Dillashaw opened his own business in 2023 called Wild Society Nutrition which is a supplement company aimed towards athletes.

== Championships and accomplishments ==
- Ultimate Fighting Championship
  - UFC Bantamweight Championship (Two times)
    - Two successful title defenses (First reign)
    - One successful title defense (Second reign)
    - Three successful title defenses (Overall)
      - Most title bouts in UFC Bantamweight history (7)
      - First fighter to finish a title bout in the fifth round twice (UFC 173 & UFC 177)
      - Most wins in UFC Bantamweight title bouts (5)
      - Tied (Matt Hughes, Randy Couture & Chuck Liddell) for third most knockouts in UFC title fights (5)
  - Fight of the Night (Three times) vs. Raphael Assunção, Renan Barão 1, and Dominick Cruz
  - Performance of the Night (Five times) vs. Renan Barão (2), Joe Soto, and Cody Garbrandt (2)
    - Second most Post-Fight bonuses in UFC Bantamweight division history (8)
  - Second most finishes in UFC Bantamweight division history (8)
  - Tied (Sean O'Malley & Marlon Vera) for most knockouts in UFC Bantamweight division history (7)
  - Tied (Merab Dvalishvili) for third most wins in UFC Bantamweight division history (13)
  - Fifth most significant strikes landed in UFC Bantamweight division history (1122)
  - Fifth most total strikes landed in UFC Bantamweight division history (1522)
  - Tied (Alex Caceres) for fourth most submission attempts in UFC Bantamweight division history (12)
  - Tied (Urijah Faber) for sixth most bouts in UFC Bantamweight division history (17)
  - The Ultimate Fighter 14 Runner-up
  - UFC.com Awards
    - 2014: Ranked #3 Fighter of the Year, Upset of the Year vs. Renan Barão 1 & Ranked #8 Fight of the Year vs. Renan Barão 1
    - 2021: Ranked #9 Fight of the Year vs. Cory Sandhagen
- World MMA Awards
  - 2014 Upset of the Year vs. Renan Barão at UFC 173
- Pundit Areana
  - 2017 Fight of the Year vs. Cody Garbrandt at UFC 217
- MMA Junkie
  - 2021 July Fight of the Month vs. Cory Sandhagen at UFC on ESPN: Sandhagen vs. Dillashaw
- Fight Matrix
  - 2014 Most Lopsided Upset of the Year vs. Renan Barão at UFC 173
  - 2021 Comeback Fighter of the Year
- Inside MMA
  - 2014 Male Fighter of the Year Bazzie Award
  - 2014 Upset of the Year Bazzie Award vs. Renan Barão at UFC 173
- Bloody Elbow
  - 2014 Upset of the Year vs. Renan Barão at UFC 173
- CBS Sports
  - 2016 #9 Ranked UFC Fight of the Year vs. Dominick Cruz at UFC Fight Night: Dillashaw vs. Cruz
  - 2017 #3 Ranked UFC Fight of the Year vs. Cody Garbrandt at UFC 217
- Bleacher Report
  - 2014 #2 Ranked Fighter of the Year
- Combat Press
  - 2014 Upset of the Year vs. Renan Barão at UFC 173
- Fightland
  - 2014 Technical Turn-Around of the Year

=== Amateur wrestling ===
- California Interscholastic Federation
  - CIF High School State Championship Runner-up (2004)
  - CIF All-State (2003, 2004)
- National Collegiate Athletic Association
  - NCAA Division I Qualifier out of California State University (Fullerton) (2007, 2008, 2009)
  - Pac-10 133 lb Conference 4th Place out of California State University (Fullerton) (2007, 2008)

== Mixed martial arts record ==
Professional record breakdown
22 matches	17 wins	5 losses
By knockout	8	3
By submission	3	0
By decision	6	2

Res.	Record	Opponent	Method	Event	Date	Round	Time	Location	Notes
Loss	17–5	Aljamain Sterling	TKO (punches)	UFC 280	October 22, 2022	2	3:44	Abu Dhabi, United Arab Emirates	For the UFC Bantamweight Championship.
Win	17–4	Cory Sandhagen	Decision (split)	UFC on ESPN: Sandhagen vs. Dillashaw	July 24, 2021	5	5:00	Las Vegas, Nevada, United States	Return to Bantamweight.
Loss	16–4	Henry Cejudo	TKO (punches)	UFC Fight Night: Cejudo vs. Dillashaw	January 19, 2019	1	0:32	Brooklyn, New York, United States	Flyweight debut. For the UFC Flyweight Championship. Dillashaw tested positive in pre and post-fight drug tests for erythropoietin.
Win	16–3	Cody Garbrandt	KO (knee and punches)	UFC 227	August 4, 2018	1	4:10	Los Angeles, California, United States	Defended the UFC Bantamweight Championship. Performance of the Night. Dillashaw vacated the title on March 20, 2019 after a failed drug test.
Win	15–3	Cody Garbrandt	TKO (punches)	UFC 217	November 4, 2017	2	2:41	New York City, New York, United States	Won the UFC Bantamweight Championship. Performance of the Night.
Win	14–3	John Lineker	Decision (unanimous)	UFC 207	December 30, 2016	3	5:00	Las Vegas, Nevada, United States	
Win	13–3	Raphael Assunção	Decision (unanimous)	UFC 200	July 9, 2016	3	5:00	Las Vegas, Nevada, United States	
Loss	12–3	Dominick Cruz	Decision (split)	UFC Fight Night: Dillashaw vs. Cruz	January 17, 2016	5	5:00	Boston, Massachusetts, United States	Lost the UFC Bantamweight Championship. Fight of the Night.
Win	12–2	Renan Barão	TKO (punches)	UFC on Fox: Dillashaw vs. Barão 2	July 25, 2015	4	0:35	Chicago, Illinois, United States	Defended the UFC Bantamweight Championship. Performance of the Night.
Win	11–2	Joe Soto	KO (head kick and punches)	UFC 177	August 30, 2014	5	2:20	Sacramento, California, United States	Defended the UFC Bantamweight Championship. Performance of the Night.
Win	10–2	Renan Barão	TKO (head kick and punches)	UFC 173	May 24, 2014	5	2:26	Las Vegas, Nevada, United States	Won the UFC Bantamweight Championship. Performance of the Night. Fight of the Night.
Win	9–2	Mike Easton	Decision (unanimous)	UFC Fight Night: Rockhold vs. Philippou	January 15, 2014	3	5:00	Duluth, Georgia, United States	
Loss	8–2	Raphael Assunção	Decision (split)	UFC Fight Night: Maia vs. Shields	October 9, 2013	3	5:00	Barueri, Brazil	Fight of the Night.
Win	8–1	Hugo Viana	TKO (punches)	UFC on Fox: Henderson vs. Melendez	April 20, 2013	1	4:22	San Jose, California, United States	
Win	7–1	Issei Tamura	KO (head kick and punches)	UFC 158	March 16, 2013	2	0:26	Montreal, Quebec, Canada	
Win	6–1	Vaughan Lee	Submission (neck crank)	UFC on Fuel TV: Muñoz vs. Weidman	July 11, 2012	1	2:33	San Jose, California, United States	
Win	5–1	Walel Watson	Decision (unanimous)	UFC on Fuel TV: Sanchez vs. Ellenberger	February 15, 2012	3	5:00	Omaha, Nebraska, United States	
Loss	4–1	John Dodson	TKO (punches)	The Ultimate Fighter: Team Bisping vs. Team Miller Finale	December 3, 2011	1	1:54	Las Vegas, Nevada, United States	The Ultimate Fighter 14 Bantamweight Tournament Final.
Win	4–0	Taylor McCorriston	TKO (punches)	Capitol Fighting Championships	November 20, 2010	3	1:07	Sacramento, California, United States	
Win	3–0	Mike Suarez	Submission (rear-naked choke)	Rebel Fighter: Domination	October 2, 2010	1	2:42	Roseville, California, United States	
Win	2–0	Brandon Drucker	Submission (rear-naked choke)	Fight For Wrestling 1	May 22, 2010	1	2:46	San Luis Obispo, California, United States	
Win	1–0	Czar Sklavos	Decision (unanimous)	KOTC: Legacy	March 26, 2010	3	5:00	Reno, Nevada, United States	

=== Mixed martial arts exhibition record ===
Exhibition record breakdown		
3 matches	3 wins	0 losses
By knockout	1	0
By submission	1	0
By decision	1	0

Res.	Record	Opponent	Method	Event	Date	Round	Time	Location	Notes
Win	3–0	Dustin Pague	Decision (unanimous)	The Ultimate Fighter: Team Bisping vs. Team Miller	July 12, 2011	3	5:00	Las Vegas, Nevada, United States	The Ultimate Fighter 14 Semi-finals.
Win	2–0	Roland Delorme	Submission (rear-naked choke)	The Ultimate Fighter: Team Bisping vs. Team Miller	July 6, 2011	2	1:44	Las Vegas, Nevada, United States	The Ultimate Fighter 14 Quarter-finals.
Win	1–0	Matt Jaggers	TKO (punches)	The Ultimate Fighter: Team Bisping vs. Team Miller	June 7, 2011	1	4:59	Las Vegas, Nevada, United States	The Ultimate Fighter 14 Elimination bout.

== Pay-per-view bouts ==
No.	Event	Fight	Date	Venue	City	PPV Buys
1.	UFC 173	Barão vs. Dillashaw	May 24, 2014	MGM Grand Garden Arena	Las Vegas, Nevada	215,000
2.	UFC 177	Dillashaw vs. Soto	August 30, 2014	ARCO Arena	Sacramento, California	125,000
3.	UFC 227	Dillashaw vs. Garbrandt 2	August 4, 2018	Staples Center	Los Angeles, California	300,000

== NCAA record ==
NCAA Championships Matches
Res.	Record	Opponent	Score	Date	Event
2009 NCAA Championships at 133 lbs
Loss	0-6	Rick Deubel	MD 3-12	March 19, 2009	2009 NCAA Division I Wrestling Championships
Loss	0-5	Nick Fanthorpe	TF 4-19	March 19, 2009	2009 NCAA Division I Wrestling Championships
2008 NCAA Championships at 133 lbs
Loss	0-4	Dave Marble	7-11	March 20, 2008	2008 NCAA Division I Wrestling Championships
Loss	0-3	Tyler McCormick	2-5	March 20, 2008	2008 NCAA Division I Wrestling Championships
2007 NCAA Championships at 133 lbs
Loss	0-2	Dan Mitcheff	4-8	March 16, 2007	2007 NCAA Division I Wrestling Championships
Loss	0-1	Dave Marble	7-14	March 16, 2007	2007 NCAA Division I Wrestling Championships

== See also ==
- List of male mixed martial artists
- List of UFC bonus award recipients

Achievements
Preceded by Renan Barão	3rd UFC Bantamweight Champion; May 24, 2014 – January 17, 2016	Succeeded by Dominick Cruz
Preceded by Cody Garbrandt	6th UFC Bantamweight Champion; November 4, 2017 – March 20, 2019; Vacated following failed drug test.	Succeeded by Henry Cejudo
