= Team Alpha Male =

Martial arts gym in Sacramento, California

- Est.: 2004; 22 years ago
- Founded by: Urijah Faber
- Primary owners: Urijah Faber
- Primary trainers: Urijah Faber; Danny Castillo; Chris Holdsworth
- Past titleholders: T.J. Dillashaw; Cody Garbrandt; Deiveson Figueiredo
- Training facilities: Sacramento, California, United States
- Website: www.teamalphamale.com

Team Alpha Male is a martial arts gym based in Sacramento, California, United States. It is one of the pioneering schools of mixed martial arts (MMA) among the lower weight classes. It has produced three UFC Champions: T.J. Dillashaw, Cody Garbrandt and Deiveson Figueiredo.

== Overview ==
Urijah Faber founded Team Alpha Male in 2004. The team trains primarily out of Ultimate Fitness located in Sacramento, California. Members of the team played an integral part of Team Faber during Season 15, Season 22 and Season 25 of The Ultimate Fighter. From December 2012 to May 2014 the head coach of Team Alpha Male was the 2013 MMA Coach of the Year UFC veteran Duane Ludwig. Longtime UFC contender Martin Kampmann began serving as coach for the team in September 2014.

In 2018, Team Alpha Male won a team grappling tournament at Quintet where they defeated Team Polaris in the finals.

== Notable people ==
=== Mixed martial artists ===
- Urijah Faber — former WEC Featherweight Champion
- T.J. Dillashaw — former UFC Bantamweight Champion
- Cody Garbrandt — former UFC Bantamweight Champion
- Deiveson Figueiredo — former UFC Flyweight Champion
- Clay Guida — former Strikeforce Lightweight Champion
- Lance Palmer — winner of the PFL 2018 and 2019 featherweight tournaments, former WSOF Featherweight Champion
- Chad Mendes
- Joseph Benavidez
- Sage Northcutt
- Darren Elkins
- Josh Emmett
- Li Jingliang
- Song Yadong
- Su Mudaerji
- Paige VanZant
- Yan Xiaonan
- Myktybek Orolbai

=== Grapplers ===
- Gordon Ryan
- Antoine Jaoude

=== Trainers ===
- Urijah Faber
- Justin Buchholz
- Danny Castillo
- Chris Holdsworth

== Awards ==
- World MMA Awards
  - 2014 Gym of the Year
  - 2014 Coach of the Year: Duane Ludwig
  - 2013 Gym of the Year
  - 2013 Coach of the Year: Duane Ludwig

== See also ==
- List of professional MMA training camps
