= Aljamain Sterling =

American mixed martial artist (born 1989)

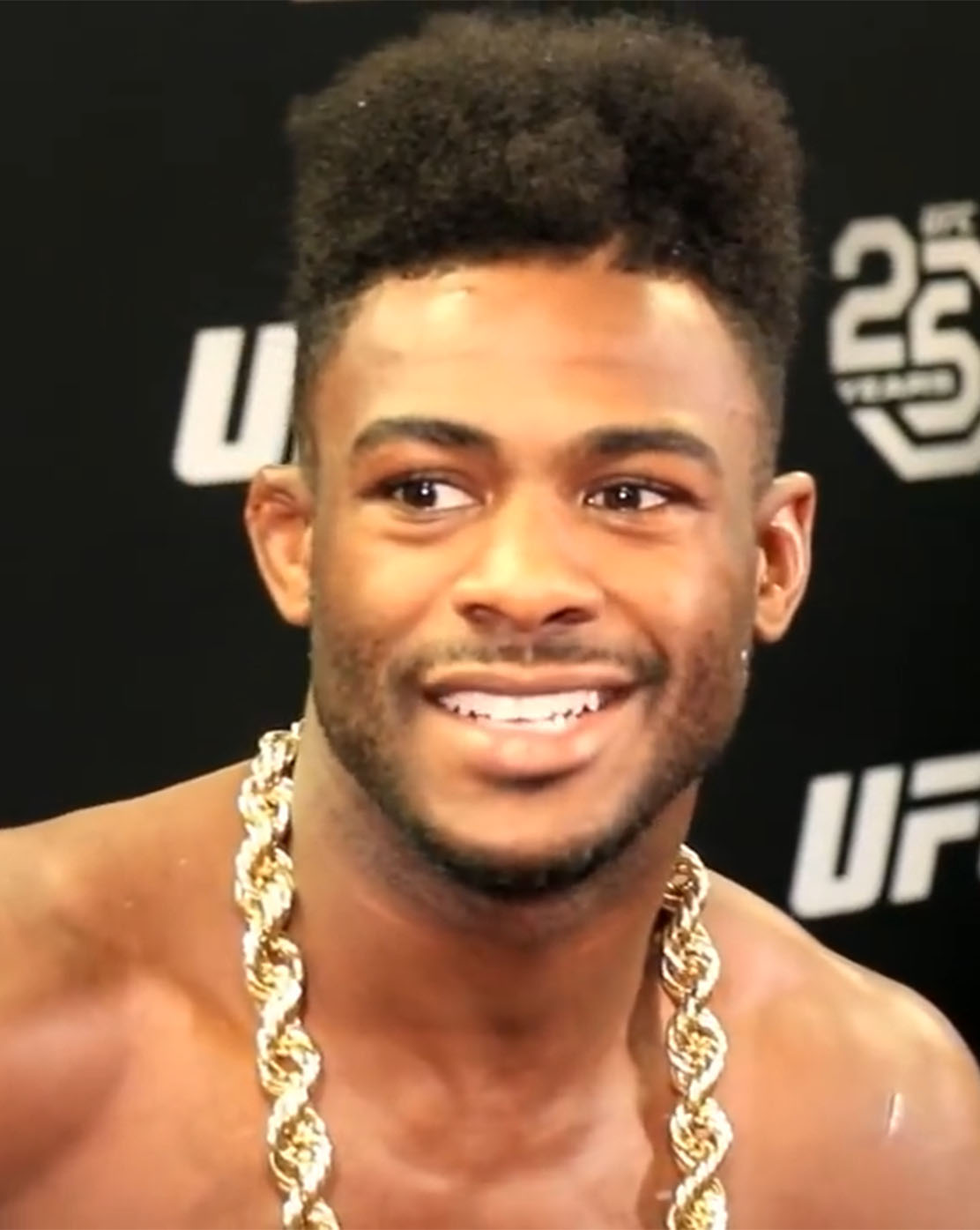
- Sterling at UFC 228 in 2018
- Born: Aljamain Antoine Sterling; July 31, 1989 (age 37); Uniondale, New York, U.S.
- Other names: Funk Master
- Height: 5 ft 7 in (1.70 m)
- Weight: 146 lb (66 kg; 10.4 st)
- Division: Bantamweight (2011–2023); Featherweight (2011, 2024–present)
- Reach: 71 in (180 cm)
- Fighting out of: Uniondale, New York, U.S.
- Team: Serra-Longo Fight Team
- Trainer: Ray Longo; Matt Serra; Eric Nicksick
- Rank: Black belt in Brazilian jiu-jitsu under Matt Serra
- Wrestling: NCAA Division III Wrestling All-American
- Years active: 2010–present

Mixed martial arts record
- Total: 32
- Wins: 26
- By knockout: 3
- By submission: 8
- By decision: 14
- By disqualification: 1
- Losses: 6
- By knockout: 2
- By decision: 4

Other information
- University: SUNY Cortland, BS in physical education
- Website: aljamainsterling.com
- Mixed martial arts record from Sherdog

YouTube information
- Channel: FunkMasterMMA
- Subscribers: 90 thousand
- Views: 18.7 million
- Last updated: January 17, 2026

Aljamain Antoine Sterling (born July 31, 1989) is an American professional mixed martial artist. He currently competes in the Featherweight division of the Ultimate Fighting Championship (UFC), where he is a former UFC Bantamweight Champion. Sterling is the first UFC champion to win a title by disqualification. He also competed for Cage Fury Fighting Championship, where he is a former Cage Fury Fighting Bantamweight Champion. As of April 28, 2026, he is #4 in Meta UFC featherweight rankings.

== Background ==
Sterling was born in 1989 in Uniondale, New York to Jamaican parents, Cleveland and Sophia Sterling. He grew up with seven full siblings and at least 12 half-siblings. To stay away from the prevalent gang life in which some of his brothers joined, Sterling started wrestling at Uniondale High School in 2004.

== Wrestling career ==
Unable to catch up with the grades to reach Division I, Sterling opted to enroll at Morrisville State College where he continued wrestling. During the time in Morrisville, Sterling developed an interest in MMA when he met Jon Jones and trained on the wrestling team. After his freshman year, Sterling transferred to Cortland and eventually became a two-time NCAA Division III All-American with a record of 87–27. Sterling graduated from Cortland with a bachelor's degree in physical education.

After years of absence from wrestling competition, Sterling wrestled and grappled two-time NCAA DI wrestling All-American and sophomore from Penn State Roman Bravo-Young, on December 22, 2020, at the NLWC IV. The rules consisted of six minutes of freestyle wrestling and three minutes of Brazilian jiu-jitsu. Sterling was defeated by points in the first match 6-4 but tapped out Bravo-Young in the second one.

Sterling's nickname “The Funk Master” comes from his unorthodox wrestling style.

== Mixed martial arts career ==
While studying in Cortland, Sterling was invited by Jones to try out mixed martial arts at his gym of that time, The BombSquad in Ithaca, New York. A few fights into his professional career, Sterling left The BombSquad and started training at Serra-Longo Fight Team.

=== Early career ===
Sterling started his amateur career in 2009 with a submission win. Prior to turning pro Sterling compiled a 6–1 amateur record with the lone loss coming by way of split decision, he would eventually avenge this loss. Sterling captured the Raging Wolf amateur Bantamweight Championship and Extreme FC amateur Featherweight Championship along the way.

Sterling started his professional career 2–0, before earning a shot at the ROC Bantamweight Championship. He would go on to defeat Claudio Ledesma by split decision to capture the title. Although this would turn out to be his last bout under the Ring of Combat organization, as he would later sign with Cage Fury Fighting Championships.

Sterling made his CFFC debut in a Featherweight bout against Evan Chmieleski. He won the fight by TKO with just two seconds left in the first round. This victory earned him a shot at the vacant CFFC Bantamweight Championship. Sterling defeated Sean Santella via unanimous decision to capture his second professional title. He would go on to defend the CFFC Bantamweight Championship on three occasions. Sterling finished all three of his title defenses by rear naked choke, which earned him the opportunity to compete in the UFC.

=== Ultimate Fighting Championship ===
==== 2014 ====
Sterling was scheduled to make his UFC debut at UFC 170 against Lucas Martins, replacing an injured Bryan Caraway. However Martins was eventually injured as well and replaced by fellow UFC newcomer Cody Gibson. Sterling won the fight via unanimous decision.

Sterling made his second UFC appearance on July 16, 2014, at UFC Fight Night 45 against Hugo Viana. After controlling the majority of the fight Sterling landed a barrage of punches from the mount position causing the referee to wave off the fight late in the third round.

Sterling was expected to face Mitch Gagnon at UFC Fight Night: MacDonald vs. Saffiedine on October 4, 2014. However, Sterling pulled out of the bout and was replaced by Rob Font.

Following a quick recovery, Sterling was promptly rebooked and was expected to face Frankie Saenz on November 8, 2014, at UFC Fight Night 55. However, Saenz was forced to withdraw from the bout and in turn promotional newcomer Michael Imperato was briefly linked as a replacement. However, his signing was quickly rescinded and as a result, Sterling was pulled from the event altogether.

==== 2015 ====
Sterling was expected to face Manny Gamburyan on April 18, 2015, at UFC on Fox 15. However, Gamburyan pulled out of the bout citing injury and was replaced by Takeya Mizugaki. Sterling won the fight by submission in the third round.

Sterling faced Johnny Eduardo on December 10, 2015, at UFC Fight Night 80. He won the fight via submission in the second round.

==== 2016 ====
Sterling next faced Bryan Caraway on May 29, 2016, at UFC Fight Night 88. Despite dominating the first round, Sterling began to tire and would go on to lose the following two rounds and lose via split decision.

Sterling was expected to face Raphael Assunção on December 9, 2016, at UFC Fight Night 102. However, Sterling pulled out of the fight on November 23 citing injury. Assunção was subsequently removed from the card.

==== 2017 ====
The bout with Assunção was rescheduled and took place on January 28, 2017, at UFC on Fox 23. Sterling lost the fight via split decision.

Sterling faced Augusto Mendes on April 15, 2017, at UFC on Fox 24. He won the fight by unanimous decision.

Sterling faced Renan Barão on July 29, 2017, at UFC 214. The fight was initially contracted to be contested at bantamweight, however on June 28, the CSAC announced that they would not license Barão to compete at that weight due to his struggle to make the required weight at UFC 177. The bout with Sterling proceeded as scheduled at a catchweight of 140 lbs. Sterling won the bout by unanimous decision.

Sterling was expected to face Rani Yahya on December 9, 2017, at UFC Fight Night 123. However, Yahya pulled out from the event on November 7, 2017, due to injury, and was replaced by Marlon Moraes. He lost the fight via KO in the first round.

==== 2018 ====
Sterling faced Brett Johns on April 21, 2018, at UFC Fight Night 128. He won the fight via unanimous decision.

Sterling faced Cody Stamann on September 8, 2018, at UFC 228. He won the fight via submission in the second round.

==== 2019 ====
Sterling faced Jimmie Rivera on February 17, 2019, at UFC on ESPN 1. He won the fight by unanimous decision.

Sterling faced Pedro Munhoz on June 8, 2019, at UFC 238. He won the fight by unanimous decision.

==== 2020 ====
Sterling faced Cory Sandhagen on June 6, 2020, at UFC 250 in a bout that UFC president Dana White confirmed to be a bantamweight title eliminator. He won the bout via submission in the first round. This win earned him his first Performance of the Night.

==== UFC Bantamweight Champion ====
Sterling was expected to face Petr Yan for the UFC Bantamweight Championship on December 12, 2020, at UFC 256. However, on November 22, it was announced the bout was scrapped from the UFC 256 card due to undisclosed reasons and the bout took place on March 6, 2021, at UFC 259. Sterling won the fight by disqualification due to an intentional illegal knee in the fourth round, becoming the new UFC Bantamweight Champion. He became the first fighter in UFC history to win a championship by disqualification.

A rematch with Yan was expected to take place on October 30, 2021, at UFC 267. However, on September 25, Sterling withdrew from the contest due to lingering neck issues from surgery. The pair was initially rescheduled to meet at UFC 272 on March 5, 2022, but the bout was pushed back to UFC 273 on April 9. Sterling won the close bout and defended the title via split decision. 11 of 18 MMA media outlets scored the bout for Sterling, while 5 scored it as a draw.

Sterling successfully defended his title against T.J. Dillashaw on October 22, 2022, at UFC 280. Following a shoulder dislocation suffered by Dillashaw in the first, Sterling defended the title via TKO in the second round, marking his first victory by strikes in nearly eight years.

Sterling faced Henry Cejudo on May 6, 2023, at UFC 288. He won the fight by split decision and retained his title. 21 of 23 MMA media outlets scored the bout for Sterling, while 2 scored it for Cejudo.

Sterling faced Sean O'Malley on August 19, 2023, at UFC 292. He lost the fight by second-round technical knockout and lost his title.

==== Move to Featherweight ====
Sterling moved up to the featherweight division and faced Calvin Kattar on April 13, 2024, at UFC 300. He won the fight by unanimous decision. On an episode of The MMA Hour following the win, Sterling confessed he would have considered retiring if he lost to Kattar.

Sterling was scheduled to face Movsar Evloev on October 5, 2024 at UFC 307. However, Sterling withdrew from the fight due to an injury sustained in sparring. The pairing was eventually rescheduled to UFC 310 on December 7, 2024. Sterling lost the fight by unanimous decision.

Sterling faced former UFC Featherweight Championship challenger Brian Ortega on August 23, 2025 at UFC Fight Night 257. Originally slated as a featherweight bout, the fight was changed to a 153-pound catchweight after reports that Ortega experienced complications during his weight cut. Sterling won the fight by unanimous decision.

Sterling faced Youssef Zalal on April 25, 2026 at UFC Fight Night 274. He won the fight via unanimous decision.

Sterling faced Kevin Vallejos on November 21, 2026 at UFC Fight Night 294. He lost the fight by unanimous decision. 9 out of 13 media outlets scored the bout for Vallejos.

== Professional grappling career ==
Sterling has also competed in submission grappling, defeating Damien Nitkin at High Rollerz 18 on August 13, 2022.

Sterling was originally booked to compete in a superfight against Nathaniel Wood at Polaris 25 on September 30, 2023. Wood withdrew from the match on a few week's notice and was replaced by Mike Grundy. Sterling defeated Grundy by decision.

Sterling faced Kevin Dantzler in the main event of Fury Pro Grappling 8 on December 30, 2023. The bout was largely uneventful, with Dantzler immediately sitting down and spending the entirety in bottom position. The highlights of the match came when Dantzler attempted an armbar which Sterling defended by picking him up and spinning him around, along with dragging Dantzler around the mat by his ankle. Dantzler won the bout by decision. Sterling criticized the result, saying, "I don’t even know how they score that. Another man can’t drag his ass cheeks on the mat and think that’s a win, doing absolutely nothing."

Sterling competed against Chase Hooper in the main event of ADXC 2 on January 19, 2024. He won the match by split decision.

Sterling faced Jay Jay Wilson on July 25, 2024 at Karate Combat's Pit Submission Series 7. He won the bout by points in the overtime round.

== Championships and accomplishments ==
=== Mixed martial arts ===
- Ultimate Fighting Championship
  - UFC Bantamweight Championship (One time)
    - First UFC champion to win a title by disqualification
    - Three successful title defenses
    - Tied (Merab Dvalishvili) for the most consecutive title defenses in UFC Bantamweight division history (3)
    - Tied (Dominick Cruz, Renan Barão & Merab Dvalishvili) for second most title fight wins in UFC Bantamweight division history (4)
  - Performance of the Night (One time) vs. Cory Sandhagen
  - Tied (Marlon Vera) for most wins in UFC Bantamweight division history (14)
    - Tied (Dominick Cruz & Marlon Vera) for most wins in UFC/WEC Bantamweight division history (14)
  - Second longest win streak in UFC Bantamweight division history (9)
  - Sixth most total fight time in UFC Bantamweight division history (3:55:40)
  - Second most control time in UFC Bantamweight division history (1:09:10) (behind Merab Dvalishvili)
  - Third most total strikes landed in UFC Bantamweight division history (1670)
  - Tied (Raphael Assunção) for fourth most bouts in UFC Bantamweight division history (18)
  - Tied (Kyung Ho Kang, Mario Bautista & Marlon Vera) for third most submissions in UFC Bantamweight division history (4)
  - Tied (Takeya Mizugaki) for third most decision wins in UFC Bantamweight division history (7)
  - Fourth longest top-position time in UFC Bantamweight division history (46:36)
  - Fourth highest striking differential in UFC Bantamweight division history (2.25)
  - Third most submission attempts in UFC Bantamweight division history (13)
  - Tied (Petr Yan) for seventh most takedowns landed in UFC Bantamweight division history (32)
  - Holds wins over four former UFC champions — vs. Renan Barão, Petr Yan (twice), T.J. Dillashaw and Henry Cejudo
  - UFC.com Awards
    - 2015: Ranked #10 Submission of the Year vs. Takeya Mizugaki
    - 2018: Ranked #3 Submission of the Year vs. Cody Stamann (Tied with Zabit Magomedsharipov)
    - 2020: Half-Year Awards: Best Submission of the 1HY & Ranked #3 Submission of the Year vs. Cory Sandhagen
    - 2022: Ranked #7 Fighter of the Year & Ranked #7 Upset of the Year vs. Petr Yan 2
- Cage Fury Fighting Championships
  - CFFC Bantamweight Championship (One time)
    - Three successful title defenses
- Ring of Combat
  - ROC Bantamweight Championship (One time)
- MMAJunkie.com
  - 2018 Submission of the Year vs. Cody Stamann
  - 2020 June Submission of the Month vs. Cory Sandhagen
- Cageside Press
  - 2020 "Submission of the Year" vs. Cory Sandhagen, tied with Khabib Nurmagomedov and A.J. McKee
- World MMA Awards
  - 2022 Comeback of the Year
- MMA Fighting
  - 2022 Second Team MMA All-Star

== Mixed martial arts record ==
Professional record breakdown
32 matches	26 wins	6 losses
By knockout	3	2
By submission	8	0
By decision	14	4
By disqualification	1	0

Res.	Record	Opponent	Method	Event	Date	Round	Time	Location	Notes
Loss	26–6	Kevin Vallejos	Decision (unanimous)	UFC Fight Night: Procházka vs. Stirling	November 21, 2026	3	5:00	Al Rayyan, Qatar	
Win	26–5	Youssef Zalal	Decision (unanimous)	UFC Fight Night: Sterling vs. Zalal	April 25, 2026	5	5:00	Las Vegas, Nevada, United States	
Win	25–5	Brian Ortega	Decision (unanimous)	UFC Fight Night: Walker vs. Zhang	August 23, 2025	5	5:00	Shanghai, China	Catchweight (153 lb) bout.
Loss	24–5	Movsar Evloev	Decision (unanimous)	UFC 310	December 7, 2024	3	5:00	Las Vegas, Nevada, United States	
Win	24–4	Calvin Kattar	Decision (unanimous)	UFC 300	April 13, 2024	3	5:00	Las Vegas, Nevada, United States	Return to Featherweight.
Loss	23–4	Sean O'Malley	TKO (punches)	UFC 292	August 19, 2023	2	0:51	Boston, Massachusetts, United States	Lost the UFC Bantamweight Championship.
Win	23–3	Henry Cejudo	Decision (split)	UFC 288	May 6, 2023	5	5:00	Newark, New Jersey, United States	Defended the UFC Bantamweight Championship. Broke the record for the most consecutive UFC Bantamweight title defenses (3).
Win	22–3	T.J. Dillashaw	TKO (punches)	UFC 280	October 22, 2022	2	3:44	Abu Dhabi, United Arab Emirates	Defended the UFC Bantamweight Championship.
Win	21–3	Petr Yan	Decision (split)	UFC 273	April 9, 2022	5	5:00	Jacksonville, Florida, United States	Defended and unified the UFC Bantamweight Championship.
Win	20–3	Petr Yan	DQ (illegal knee)	UFC 259	March 6, 2021	4	4:29	Las Vegas, Nevada, United States	Won the UFC Bantamweight Championship.
Win	19–3	Cory Sandhagen	Submission (rear-naked choke)	UFC 250	June 6, 2020	1	1:28	Las Vegas, Nevada, United States	UFC Bantamweight title eliminator. Performance of the Night.
Win	18–3	Pedro Munhoz	Decision (unanimous)	UFC 238	June 8, 2019	3	5:00	Chicago, Illinois, United States	
Win	17–3	Jimmie Rivera	Decision (unanimous)	UFC on ESPN: Ngannou vs. Velasquez	February 17, 2019	3	5:00	Phoenix, Arizona, United States	
Win	16–3	Cody Stamann	Submission (Suloev stretch)	UFC 228	September 8, 2018	2	3:42	Dallas, Texas, United States	
Win	15–3	Brett Johns	Decision (unanimous)	UFC Fight Night: Barboza vs. Lee	April 21, 2018	3	5:00	Atlantic City, New Jersey, United States	
Loss	14–3	Marlon Moraes	KO (knee)	UFC Fight Night: Swanson vs. Ortega	December 9, 2017	1	1:07	Fresno, California, United States	
Win	14–2	Renan Barão	Decision (unanimous)	UFC 214	July 29, 2017	3	5:00	Anaheim, California, United States	Catchweight (140 lb) bout.
Win	13–2	Augusto Mendes	Decision (unanimous)	UFC on Fox: Johnson vs. Reis	April 15, 2017	3	5:00	Kansas City, Missouri, United States	
Loss	12–2	Raphael Assunção	Decision (split)	UFC on Fox: Shevchenko vs. Peña	January 28, 2017	3	5:00	Denver, Colorado, United States	
Loss	12–1	Bryan Caraway	Decision (split)	UFC Fight Night: Almeida vs. Garbrandt	May 29, 2016	3	5:00	Las Vegas, Nevada, United States	
Win	12–0	Johnny Eduardo	Submission (guillotine choke)	UFC Fight Night: Namajunas vs. VanZant	December 10, 2015	2	4:18	Las Vegas, Nevada, United States	
Win	11–0	Takeya Mizugaki	Submission (arm-triangle choke)	UFC on Fox: Machida vs. Rockhold	April 18, 2015	3	2:11	Newark, New Jersey, United States	
Win	10–0	Hugo Viana	TKO (punches)	UFC Fight Night: Cowboy vs. Miller	July 16, 2014	3	3:50	Atlantic City, New Jersey, United States	
Win	9–0	Cody Gibson	Decision (unanimous)	UFC 170	February 22, 2014	3	5:00	Las Vegas, Nevada, United States	
Win	8–0	Joel Roberts	Submission (rear-naked choke)	Cage Fury FC 30	November 2, 2013	1	1:49	King of Prussia, Pennsylvania, United States	Defended the CFFC Bantamweight Championship.
Win	7–0	Sidemar Honorio	Submission (rear-naked choke)	Cage Fury FC 16	August 24, 2012	2	4:05	Atlantic City, New Jersey, United States	Defended the CFFC Bantamweight Championship.
Win	6–0	Casey Johnson	Submission (rear-naked choke)	Cage Fury FC 14	April 14, 2012	3	2:11	Atlantic City, New Jersey, United States	Defended the CFFC Bantamweight Championship.
Win	5–0	Sean Santella	Decision (unanimous)	Cage Fury FC 11	October 22, 2011	5	5:00	Atlantic City, New Jersey, United States	Return to Bantamweight. Won the CFFC Bantamweight Championship.
Win	4–0	Evan Chmielski	TKO (punches)	Cage Fury FC 10	July 23, 2011	1	4:58	Atlantic City, New Jersey, United States	Featherweight debut.
Win	3–0	Claudio Ledesma	Decision (split)	Ring of Combat 36	June 17, 2011	3	5:00	Atlantic City, New Jersey, United States	Won the Ring of Combat Bantamweight Championship.
Win	2–0	Harley Leimbach	Submission (rear-naked choke)	Extreme Fight Club: Bragging Rights 2	May 21, 2011	1	4:01	Erie, Pennsylvania, United States	
Win	1–0	Sergio da Silva	Decision (unanimous)	Urban Conflict Championships 4: Supremacy	April 22, 2011	3	5:00	Morristown, New Jersey, United States	Bantamweight debut.

== Submission grappling record ==
4 Matches, 3 Wins, 1 Losses 0 Draws
Result	Rec.	Opponent	Method	Event	Date	Location
Win	3–1	(New Zealand) Jay Jay Wilson	Decision (points)	Karate Combat 48	July 25, 2024	Nashville, Tennessee, United States
Win	2–1	(United States) Chase Hooper	Decision (split)	ADXC 2	January 19, 2024	Abu Dhabi, United Arab Emirates
Loss	1–1	(United States) Kevin Dantzler	Decision (majority)	Fury Pro Grappling 8	December 30, 2023	Philadelphia, Pennsylvania, United States
Win	1–0	(England) Mike Grundy	Decision (unanimous)	Polaris 25: Absolute GP	September 30, 2023	Ebbw Vale, Wales

== Pay-per-view bouts ==
No	Event	Fight	Date	Venue	City	PPV buys
1.	UFC 288	Sterling vs. Cejudo	May 6, 2023	Prudential Center	Newark, New Jersey, United States	Not Disclosed
2.	UFC 292	Sterling vs. O'Malley	August 19, 2023	TD Garden	Boston, Massachusetts, United States	Not Disclosed

== See also ==
- List of current UFC fighters
- List of male mixed martial artists

Achievements
Preceded by Petr Yan	9th UFC Bantamweight Champion; March 6, 2021 – August 19, 2023	Succeeded by Sean O'Malley
