= Takeya Mizugaki =

Japanese mixed martial artist

Takeya Mizugaki 水垣偉弥
- Born: December 16, 1983 (age 42); Ibaragi, Japan
- Other names: The Bull
- Height: 5 ft 7 in (1.70 m)
- Weight: 136 lb (62 kg; 9.7 st)
- Division: Bantamweight
- Reach: 69 1/2 in (177 cm)
- Style: Boxing, Judo
- Fighting out of: Kanagawa, Japan
- Team: Shooting Gym Hakkei; Haleo Top Team
- Years active: 2005–2019

Mixed martial arts record
- Total: 39
- Wins: 23
- By knockout: 5
- By submission: 1
- By decision: 17
- Losses: 14
- By knockout: 6
- By submission: 2
- By decision: 6
- Draws: 2

Other information
- Mixed martial arts record from Sherdog

Takeya Mizugaki (Japanese: 水垣偉弥, Mizugaki Takeya) (born December 16, 1983) is a retired Japanese mixed martial artist who most notably competed in the Bantamweight division of the Ultimate Fighting Championship. A professional competitor from 2005 to 2020, Mizugaki also competed for Absolute Championship Berkut, WEC, Shooto, and Cage Force.

== Mixed martial arts career ==
Mizugaki began his mixed martial arts career and competed in respected Japanese promotions Shooto and Cage Force. He was the Shooto Rookie of the Year in 2005 and winner of the Cage Force Bantamweight Tournament.

=== World Extreme Cagefighting ===
Mizugaki made his World Extreme Cagefighting debut on April 5, 2009, against Miguel Torres for the WEC Bantamweight Championship in which he lost by unanimous decision in the fifth round; he can lay claim as the first to push Torres all five rounds. He fought Jeff Curran on August 9, 2009, at WEC 42, he won by decision.

Mizugaki was expected to face Damacio Page on December 19, 2009, at WEC 45, but Page was forced off the card due to an injury. Mizugaki instead faced Scott Jorgensen and lost the fight via unanimous decision.

Mizugaki faced Brazilian jiu-jitsu ace Rani Yahya on April 24, 2010, at WEC 48. He won the fight via unanimous decision (29–28, 30–27, 29-28).

Mizugaki was set to face former WEC Featherweight Champion Urijah Faber, who was to be making his bantamweight debut, on August 18, 2010, at WEC 50. However, Faber was forced off the card with an injury. As a result, Mizugaki was also pulled from the event.

Mizugaki was defeated by Faber via first round submission November 11, 2010, at WEC 52. Mizugaki showed good take down defense but was hurt via punches toward the end of the first round, allowing Faber to take his back. After Faber was able to sink in a rear naked choke, Mizugaki refused to tap and as a result, was rendered unconscious.

=== Ultimate Fighting Championship ===
On October 28, 2010, World Extreme Cagefighting merged with the Ultimate Fighting Championship. As part of the merger, most WEC fighters were transferred to the UFC.

Mizugaki was expected to face Francisco Rivera on March 3, 2011, at UFC Live: Sanchez vs. Kampmann. However, Rivera had to withdraw from the bout due to injury, and was replaced by UFC newcomer Reuben Duran. Mizugaki defeated Duran via split decision.

Mizugaki faced Brian Bowles on July 2, 2011, at UFC 132. He lost the fight via unanimous decision.

Mizugaki faced Cole Escovedo on September 24, 2011, at UFC 135. Mizugaki utilized his crisp boxing to defeat Escovedo at 4:30 of the 2nd round via TKO.

Mizugaki faced Chris Cariaso on February 26, 2012, at UFC 144. Cariaso defeated Mizugaki via a controversial unanimous decision. Despite the loss on the scorecards, UFC president Dana White felt Mizugaki won the bout and stated in the post-fight press conference that he would be paid a win bonus.

Mizugaki was expected to face Jeff Hougland on September 1, 2012, at UFC 151. However, after UFC 151 was cancelled, Mizugaki/Hougland was rescheduled and took place on November 10, 2012, at UFC on Fuel TV 6. Mizugaki won the fight via unanimous decision.

Mizugaki faced Bryan Caraway on March 3, 2013, at UFC on Fuel TV 8. He won the fight via split decision, with two of the judges giving him the first and third rounds where he outstruck Caraway. This marked Mizugaki's first back-to-back wins since 2008.

Mizugaki faced Erik Pérez on August 28, 2013, at UFC Fight Night 27. He won the fight via split decision.

Mizugaki fought Nam Phan on December 7, 2013, at UFC Fight Night 33. He won the fight via unanimous decision.

Mizugaki was expected to face T.J. Dillashaw on May 24, 2014, at UFC 173. However, on March 27, the UFC announced that Dillashaw was moved up to the main event to face Bantamweight champion Renan Barão. Mizugaki instead faced Francisco Rivera. He won the fight via unanimous decision.

Mizugaki faced Dominick Cruz on September 27, 2014, at UFC 178. Mizugaki lost the fight via TKO in the first round after Cruz got a take-down and landed several punches against the cage.

Mizugaki faced Aljamain Sterling on April 18, 2015, at UFC on Fox 15, replacing an injured Manvel Gamburyan. He lost the fight via submission in the third round.

Mizugaki faced George Roop on September 27, 2015, at UFC Fight Night 75. He won the fight by unanimous decision.

Mizugaki next faced Cody Garbrandt on August 20, 2016, at UFC 202. He lost the fight via TKO in the opening minute of the first round.

Mizugaki faced Eddie Wineland on December 17, 2016, at UFC on Fox 22. He lost the fight via TKO in the first round and was subsequently released from the promotion.

=== Absolute Championship Berkut ===
Mizugaki made his debut in the ACB against Russia's Rustam Kerimov on September 30, 2017, at ACB 71. He lost the fight via TKO at 3:19 of the first round.

Next, he faced Murad Kalamov at ACB 80 on February 16, 2018. He lost the fight via unanimous decision.

In his final fight in the ACB, Mizugaki faced Pietro Menga at ACB 87 on May 19, 2018. He won the fight via unanimous decision.

=== Last fights and retirement ===
Mizugaki was expected to face Guangyou Ning at Rebel FC 9 on September 7, 2018, but the event was eventually cancelled.

Mizugaki faced Shoji Maruyama at DEEP 89 Impact on May 12, 2019, winning the fight via unanimous decision.

He then signed with Rizin and made his promotional debut against Manel Kape at Rizin 18 on August 18, 2019. He lost the fight via technical knockout in the second round. Mizugaki retired from mixed martial arts after the fight, but announced the retirement not until early June 2020.

== Personal life ==
Mizugaki holds a master's degree in electrical engineering from Kanto Gakuin University.

In 2021, Mizugaki opened his gym, the Belva Fight and Fitness.

== Championships and Accomplishments ==
- Cage Force
  - Cage Force Bantamweight Championship (One time)
- Shooto
  - 2005 Shooto Bantamweight Rookie Tournament Winner
- World Extreme Cagefighting
  - Fight of the Night (Two times)

== Mixed martial arts record ==
Professional record breakdown
39 matches	23 wins	14 losses
By knockout	5	6
By submission	1	2
By decision	17	6
Draws	2	

Res.	Record	Opponent	Method	Event	Date	Round	Time	Location	Notes
Loss	23–14–2	Manel Kape	KO (punch)	Rizin 18	August 18, 2019	2	1:36	Nagoya, Japan	
Win	23–13–2	Shoji Maruyama	Decision (unanimous)	DEEP 89 Impact	May 12, 2019	3	5:00	Tokyo, Japan	
Win	22–13–2	Pietro Menga	Decision (unanimous)	ACB 87: Nottingham	May 19, 2018	3	5:00	Nottingham, England	
Loss	21–13–2	Murad Kalamov	Decision (unanimous)	ACB 80: Tumenov vs. Burrell	February 16, 2018	3	5:00	Krasnodar, Russia	
Loss	21–12–2	Rustam Kerimov	TKO (punches)	ACB 71: Yan vs. Mattos	September 30, 2017	1	3:19	Moscow, Russia	
Loss	21–11–2	Eddie Wineland	TKO (punches)	UFC on Fox: VanZant vs. Waterson	December 17, 2016	1	3:04	Sacramento, California, United States	
Loss	21–10–2	Cody Garbrandt	TKO (punches)	UFC 202	August 20, 2016	1	0:48	Las Vegas, Nevada, United States	
Win	21–9–2	George Roop	Decision (unanimous)	UFC Fight Night: Barnett vs. Nelson	September 27, 2015	3	5:00	Saitama, Japan	
Loss	20–9–2	Aljamain Sterling	Submission (arm-triangle choke)	UFC on Fox: Machida vs. Rockhold	April 18, 2015	3	2:11	Newark, New Jersey, United States	
Loss	20–8–2	Dominick Cruz	KO (punches)	UFC 178	September 27, 2014	1	1:01	Las Vegas, Nevada, United States	
Win	20–7–2	Francisco Rivera	Decision (unanimous)	UFC 173	May 24, 2014	3	5:00	Las Vegas, Nevada, United States	
Win	19–7–2	Nam Phan	Decision (unanimous)	UFC Fight Night: Hunt vs. Bigfoot	December 7, 2013	3	5:00	Brisbane, Australia	
Win	18–7–2	Erik Pérez	Decision (split)	UFC Fight Night: Condit vs. Kampmann 2	August 28, 2013	3	5:00	Indianapolis, Indiana, United States	
Win	17–7–2	Bryan Caraway	Decision (split)	UFC on Fuel TV: Silva vs. Stann	March 3, 2013	3	5:00	Saitama, Japan	
Win	16–7–2	Jeff Hougland	Decision (unanimous)	UFC on Fuel TV: Franklin vs. Le	November 10, 2012	3	5:00	Macau, SAR, China	
Loss	15–7–2	Chris Cariaso	Decision (unanimous)	UFC 144	February 26, 2012	3	5:00	Saitama, Japan	
Win	15–6–2	Cole Escovedo	TKO (punches)	UFC 135	September 24, 2011	2	4:30	Denver, Colorado, United States	
Loss	14–6–2	Brian Bowles	Decision (unanimous)	UFC 132	July 2, 2011	3	5:00	Las Vegas, Nevada, United States	
Win	14–5–2	Reuben Duran	Decision (split)	UFC Live: Sanchez vs. Kampmann	March 3, 2011	3	5:00	Louisville, Kentucky, United States	
Loss	13–5–2	Urijah Faber	Technical Submission (rear-naked choke)	WEC 52	November 11, 2010	1	4:50	Las Vegas, Nevada, United States	
Win	13–4–2	Rani Yahya	Decision (unanimous)	WEC 48	April 24, 2010	3	5:00	Sacramento, California, United States	
Loss	12–4–2	Scott Jorgensen	Decision (unanimous)	WEC 45	December 19, 2009	3	5:00	Las Vegas, Nevada, United States	Fight of the Night.
Win	12–3–2	Jeff Curran	Decision (split)	WEC 42	August 9, 2009	3	5:00	Las Vegas, Nevada, United States	
Loss	11–3–2	Miguel Torres	Decision (unanimous)	WEC 40	April 5, 2009	5	5:00	Chicago, Illinois, United States	For the WEC Bantamweight Championship. Fight of the Night.
Win	11–2–2	Masahiro Oishi	TKO (punches)	GCM: Cage Force 9	December 6, 2008	2	0:57	Tokyo, Japan	Won the Cage Force Bantamweight Championship.
Win	10–2–2	Daisuke Endo	Submission (rear-naked choke)	GCM: Cage Force 8	September 27, 2008	1	4:34	Tokyo, Japan	
Win	9–2–2	Daichi Fujiwara	KO (punch)	GCM: Cage Force 7	June 22, 2008	1	2:38	Tokyo, Japan	
Win	8–2–2	Seiji Ozuka	Decision (unanimous)	GCM: Cage Force 5	December 1, 2007	2	5:00	Tokyo, Japan	
Win	7–2–2	Kentaro Imaizumi	Decision (unanimous)	GCM: Cage Force 4	September 8, 2007	3	5:00	Tokyo, Japan	
Draw	6–2–2	Masakatsu Ueda	Draw	Shooto: Back To Our Roots 4	July 15, 2007	3	5:00	Tokyo, Japan	
Loss	6–2–1	Atsushi Yamamoto	Decision (unanimous)	Shooto: Back To Our Roots 1	February 17, 2007	3	5:00	Yokohama, Japan	
Loss	6–1–1	Kenji Osawa	TKO (punches and knees)	Shooto: 11/10 in Korakuen Hall	November 10, 2006	2	0:59	Tokyo, Japan	
Draw	6–0–1	Ryota Matsune	Draw	Shooto 2006: 7/21 in Korakuen Hall	July 21, 2006	3	5:00	Tokyo, Japan	
Win	6–0	Takamaro Watari	TKO (punches)	Shooto: The Devilock	May 12, 2006	1	3:49	Tokyo, Japan	
Win	5–0	Tetsu Suzuki	Decision (unanimous)	Shooto: 12/17 in Shinjuku Face	December 17, 2005	2	5:00	Tokyo, Japan	
Win	4–0	Teriyuki Matsumoto	KO (punch)	Shooto 2005: 11/6 in Korakuen Hall	November 6, 2005	1	0:13	Tokyo, Japan	
Win	3–0	Shin Kato	Decision (majority)	Shooto: 9/23 in Korakuen Hall	September 23, 2005	2	5:00	Tokyo, Japan	
Win	2–0	Naoki Yahagi	Decision (unanimous)	Shooto: 6/3 in Kitazawa Town Hall	June 3, 2005	2	5:00	Tokyo, Japan	
Win	1–0	Satoshi Yamashita	Decision (unanimous)	Shooto: 2/6 in Kitazawa Town Hall	February 6, 2005	2	5:00	Tokyo, Japan	

== See also ==
- List of current UFC fighters
- List of male mixed martial artists
