= Cory Sandhagen =

American mixed martial artist

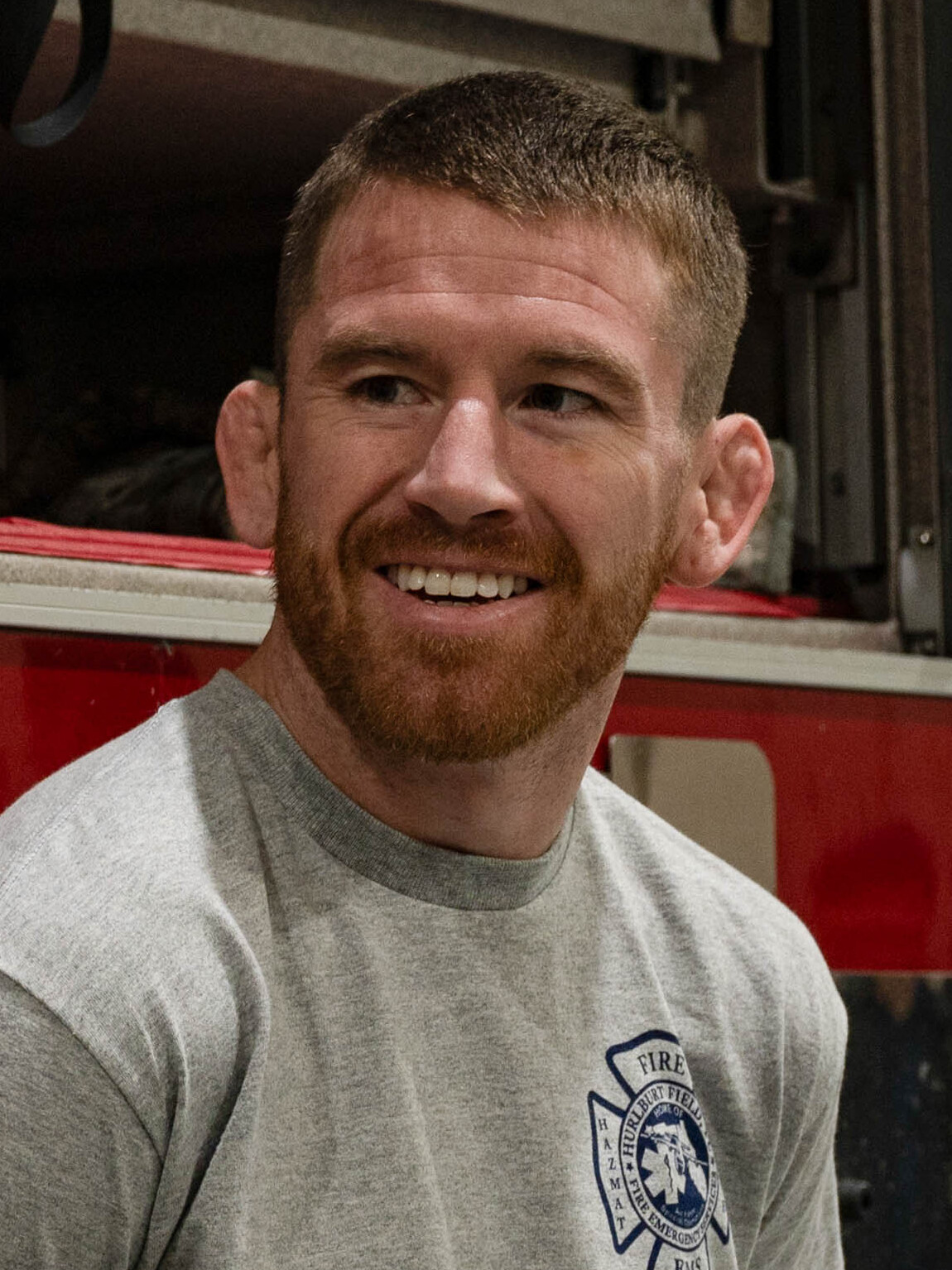
- Sandhagen in 2024
- Born: Cory James Sandhagen; April 20, 1992 (age 34); Aurora, Colorado, U.S.
- Other names: The Sandman
- Height: 5 ft 11 in (1.80 m)
- Weight: 135 lb (61 kg; 9 st 9 lb)
- Division: Bantamweight (2015, 2018–present); Featherweight (2016–2018)
- Reach: 69 1/2 in (177 cm)
- Fighting out of: Aurora, Colorado, U.S.
- Team: High Altitude Martial Arts (2010–present); Elevation Fight Team (2017–2024); Forge Fight Club (2024–present)
- Rank: Brown belt in Brazilian Jiu-Jitsu under Eliot Marshall
- Years active: 2015–present

Mixed martial arts record
- Total: 25
- Wins: 18
- By knockout: 8
- By submission: 3
- By decision: 7
- Losses: 7
- By submission: 1
- By decision: 6

Other information
- University: University of Colorado Boulder
- Mixed martial arts record from Sherdog

Cory James Sandhagen (born April 20, 1992) is an American professional mixed martial artist. He currently competes in the Bantamweight division of the Ultimate Fighting Championship (UFC). A professional since 2015, Sandhagen also competed for Legacy Fighting Alliance. As of August 29, 2026, he is #6 in the Meta UFC bantamweight rankings.

== Background ==
Born and raised in Aurora, Colorado, Sandhagen attended Smoky Hill High School where he was on the basketball team – a sport he had been playing from his youth. Sandhagen began martial arts training as a child, starting with taekwondo. His instructors didn't allow punches, so Sandhagen switched to kickboxing. In kickboxing, Sandhagen won multiple WKA titles including a WKA world title. He then transitioned to mixed martial arts. He had been a fan of the sport since his childhood.

Sandhagen graduated from the University of Colorado Boulder with a degree in psychology.

== Mixed martial arts career ==
=== Early career ===
Sandhagen made his Legacy Fighting Alliance debut on February 24, 2017, at LFA 5 against Jamall Emmers, losing the bout via unanimous decision. His next fight was on October 17, 2017, against Luiz Antonio Lobo Gavinho at LFA 24, which he won via first round TKO. Sandhagen's final appearance for Legacy Fighting Alliance came on January 19, 2018, at LFA 31, defeating Jose Aguayo via first round TKO.

=== Ultimate Fighting Championship ===
==== 2018 ====
Sandhagen made his promotional debut at UFC on Fox: Jacaré vs. Brunson 2 on January 27, 2018, against Austin Arnett. He won the fight via second-round TKO.

His next bout was at UFC Fight Night: Gaethje vs. Vick on August 25, 2018 Iuri Alcantara. After a back-and-forth affair, he won the fight via second-round TKO. This fight earned him the Fight of the Night award.

==== 2019 ====
Sandhagen was scheduled to face Thomas Almeida at UFC Fight Night: Cejudo vs. Dillashaw. However, it was later announced that Sandhagen would face John Lineker at the event instead. On January 10, Lineker was forced to withdraw from the bout due to a rib injury. He was replaced by promotional newcomer Mario Bautista. He won the bout via first round submission.

The bout with Lineker was rescheduled and eventually took place on April 27, 2019, at UFC Fight Night: Jacaré vs. Hermansson. Sandhagen won the fight via split decision.

Sandhagen faced Raphael Assunção on August 17, 2019, at UFC 241. He won the bout by unanimous decision.

==== 2020 ====
Sandhagen was scheduled to face Frankie Edgar in a bantamweight bout on January 25, 2020, at UFC Fight Night 166. However, Edgar was removed from the fight in favor of a bout against Chan Sung Jung a month earlier at UFC Fight Night 165. In turn, Sandhagen was removed from the card.

Sandhagen faced Aljamain Sterling on June 6, 2020, at UFC 250 in a bout that UFC president Dana White confirmed to be a bantamweight title eliminator. He lost the bout via submission in the first round.

Sandhagen faced Marlon Moraes on October 11, 2020 at UFC Fight Night 179 in the main event. Sandhagen won the fight via technical knockout in round two. This win earned him the Performance of the Night award.

==== 2021 ====
Sandhagen faced Frankie Edgar at UFC Fight Night 184 on February 6, 2021. He won the fight via knockout by flying knee in the first round. This win earned him the Performance of the Night award.

Sandhagen was scheduled to face T.J. Dillashaw on May 8, 2021, at UFC on ESPN 24. However, Dillashaw announced on April 27 that he had to pull out of the fight due to a cut he received from a headbutt in training. The pairing remained intact and was rescheduled to headline UFC on ESPN: Sandhagen vs. Dillashaw on July 24, 2021. He lost a close fight via split decision. 17 out of 23 media outlets scored the bout as a win for Sandhagen.

Sandhagen faced Petr Yan for the Interim UFC Bantamweight Championship at UFC 267 on October 30, 2021. Sandhagen served as a late replacement for Aljamain Sterling, who was forced to withdraw from the bout with Yan due to a neck injury. He lost the bout via unanimous decision. This bout earned the Fight of the Night award.

==== 2022 ====
Sandhagen faced Song Yadong on September 17, 2022, at UFC Fight Night 210. He won the fight via technical knockout after the doctor stopped the fight due to a cut.

==== 2023 ====
Sandhagen was scheduled to face Marlon Vera on February 18, 2023, at UFC Fight Night 219. However, the bout was rebooked for UFC on ESPN 43 on March 25. Sandhagen won the fight via split decision. Though one judge scored the bout for Vera, 24 out of 24 media outlets scored the bout for Sandhagen.

Sandhagen was scheduled to face Umar Nurmagomedov on August 5, 2023 at UFC on ESPN 50 in Nashville, Tennessee. However, Nurmagomedov withdrew from the event mid-July due to shoulder injury, and was replaced by Rob Font in a catchweight bout of 140 pounds. Sandhagen won the fight via unanimous decision despite tearing his right triceps during the first round.

==== 2024 ====
Sandhagen faced Umar Nurmagomedov on August 3, 2024, at UFC on ABC: Sandhagen vs. Nurmagomedov in a bantamweight title eliminator. He lost the fight by unanimous decision.

==== 2025 ====
Sandhagen faced former two-time UFC Flyweight Champion Deiveson Figueiredo in the main event on May 3, 2025 at UFC on ESPN 67. He won the fight by technical knockout in the second round after Figueiredo suffered a knee injury. This fight earned him another Performance of the Night award.

Sandhagen competed for the UFC Bantamweight Championship against current champion Merab Dvalishvili on October 4, 2025 at UFC 320. He lost the fight by unanimous decision.

==== 2026 ====
Sandhagen faced Mario Bautista in a rematch on July 11, 2026 at UFC 329. He lost the fight by unanimous decision.

== Personal life ==
Apart from his mixed martial arts career, Sandhagen worked part-time at a trauma center for children. He teaches mixed martial arts at High Altitude Martial Arts in Aurora, Colorado.

Sandhagen and his wife Erica got married in September 2023.

== Championships and accomplishments ==
- Ultimate Fighting Championship
  - Fight of the Night (Two times) vs. Iuri Alcantara and Petr Yan
  - Performance of the Night (Three times) vs. Marlon Moraes, Frankie Edgar and Deiveson Figueiredo
  - Second fastest flying-knee finish in UFC history (0:28) vs. Frankie Edgar
  - UFC Honors Awards
    - 2021: President's Choice Fight of the Year Nominee vs. Petr Yan
  - UFC.com Awards
    - 2019: Ranked #6 Submission of the Year vs. Mario Bautista
    - 2021: Ranked #4 Fight of the Year vs. Petr Yan, Ranked #3 Knockout of the Year vs. Frankie Edgar & Ranked #9 Fight of the Year vs. T.J. Dillashaw
- Sparta Combat League
  - SCL Featherweight Championship (one time; former)
- MMA Junkie
  - 2021 February Knockout of the Month vs. Frankie Edgar
  - 2021 July Fight of the Month vs. TJ Dillashaw
- Cageside Press
  - 2021 Knockout of the Year vs. Frankie Edgar
- Combat Press
  - 2021 Knockout of the Year vs. Frankie Edgar
- Bleacher Report
  - 2019 Submission of the Year vs. Mario Bautista at UFC Fight Night 143
- CBS Sports
  - 2021 #3 Ranked UFC Knockout of the Year vs. Frankie Edgar

== Mixed martial arts record ==
Professional record breakdown
25 matches	18 wins	7 losses
By knockout	8	0
By submission	3	1
By decision	7	6

Res.	Record	Opponent	Method	Event	Date	Round	Time	Location	Notes
Loss	18–7	Mario Bautista	Decision (unanimous)	UFC 329	July 11, 2026	3	5:00	Las Vegas, Nevada, United States	
Loss	18–6	Merab Dvalishvili	Decision (unanimous)	UFC 320	October 4, 2025	5	5:00	Las Vegas, Nevada, United States	For the UFC Bantamweight Championship.
Win	18–5	Deiveson Figueiredo	TKO (knee injury)	UFC on ESPN: Sandhagen vs. Figueiredo	May 3, 2025	2	4:08	Des Moines, Iowa, United States	Performance of the Night.
Loss	17–5	Umar Nurmagomedov	Decision (unanimous)	UFC on ABC: Sandhagen vs. Nurmagomedov	August 3, 2024	5	5:00	Abu Dhabi, United Arab Emirates	UFC Bantamweight title eliminator.
Win	17–4	Rob Font	Decision (unanimous)	UFC on ESPN: Sandhagen vs. Font	August 5, 2023	5	5:00	Nashville, Tennessee, United States	Catchweight (140 lb) bout.
Win	16–4	Marlon Vera	Decision (split)	UFC on ESPN: Vera vs. Sandhagen	March 25, 2023	5	5:00	San Antonio, Texas, United States	
Win	15–4	Song Yadong	TKO (doctor stoppage)	UFC Fight Night: Sandhagen vs. Song	September 17, 2022	4	5:00	Las Vegas, Nevada, United States	
Loss	14–4	Petr Yan	Decision (unanimous)	UFC 267	October 30, 2021	5	5:00	Abu Dhabi, United Arab Emirates	For the interim UFC Bantamweight Championship. Fight of the Night.
Loss	14–3	T.J. Dillashaw	Decision (split)	UFC on ESPN: Sandhagen vs. Dillashaw	July 24, 2021	5	5:00	Las Vegas, Nevada, United States	
Win	14–2	Frankie Edgar	KO (flying knee)	UFC Fight Night: Overeem vs. Volkov	February 6, 2021	1	0:28	Las Vegas, Nevada, United States	Performance of the Night.
Win	13–2	Marlon Moraes	TKO (spinning wheel kick and punches)	UFC Fight Night: Moraes vs. Sandhagen	October 10, 2020	2	1:03	Abu Dhabi, United Arab Emirates	Performance of the Night.
Loss	12–2	Aljamain Sterling	Submission (rear-naked choke)	UFC 250	June 6, 2020	1	1:28	Las Vegas, Nevada, United States	UFC Bantamweight title eliminator.
Win	12–1	Raphael Assunção	Decision (unanimous)	UFC 241	August 17, 2019	3	5:00	Anaheim, California, United States	
Win	11–1	John Lineker	Decision (split)	UFC Fight Night: Jacaré vs. Hermansson	April 27, 2019	3	5:00	Sunrise, Florida, United States	
Win	10–1	Mario Bautista	Submission (armbar)	UFC Fight Night: Cejudo vs. Dillashaw	January 19, 2019	1	3:31	Brooklyn, New York, United States	
Win	9–1	Iuri Alcântara	TKO (punches)	UFC Fight Night: Gaethje vs. Vick	August 25, 2018	2	1:01	Lincoln, Nebraska, United States	Return to Bantamweight. Fight of the Night.
Win	8–1	Austin Arnett	TKO (punches)	UFC on Fox: Jacaré vs. Brunson 2	January 27, 2018	2	3:48	Charlotte, North Carolina, United States	
Win	7–1	José Aguayo	TKO (knee and elbows)	LFA 31	January 19, 2018	1	1:07	Phoenix, Arizona, United States	
Win	6–1	Luiz Antônio Lobo Gavinho	TKO (punches)	LFA 24	October 13, 2017	1	3:00	Phoenix, Arizona, United States	
Loss	5–1	Jamall Emmers	Decision (unanimous)	LFA 5	February 24, 2017	3	5:00	Broomfield, Colorado, United States	
Win	5–0	Clay Wimer	Decision (unanimous)	RFA 43	September 9, 2016	3	5:00	Broomfield, Colorado, United States	
Win	4–0	Josh Huber	Decision (unanimous)	Sparta Combat League 50	July 16, 2016	3	5:00	Castle Rock, Colorado, United States	Won the SCL Featherweight Championship.
Win	3–0	Dalton Goddard	Submission (triangle choke)	Paramount MMA 2016	May 15, 2016	1	3:38	Denver, Colorado, United States	
Win	2–0	Andrew Tenneson	Decision (unanimous)	RFA 34	January 15, 2016	3	5:00	Broomfield, Colorado, United States	Featherweight debut.
Win	1–0	Bruce Sessman	Submission (rear-naked choke)	Prize FC 9	May 30, 2015	1	1:16	Williston, North Dakota, United States	Bantamweight debut.

== See also ==
- List of current UFC fighters
- List of male mixed martial artists
