= 14th Africa Movie Academy Awards =

2018 film awards ceremony

- Date: 20 October 2018
- Site: Intari Conference Arena, Kigali, Rwanda
- Hosted by: Nse Ikpe-Etim, Arthur Nkusi

Highlights
- Best Film: Five Fingers For Marseilles
- Most awards: Five Fingers For Marseilles (5)
- Most nominations: Five Fingers For Marseilles (10)

The 14th Africa Movie Academy Awards was held 20 October 2018 in Kigali, Rwanda. The event was hosted by Nse Ikpe Etim and Arthur Nkusi.

== Awards ==
Winners are listed highlighted in boldface.

Best Film	Best Director
**Five Fingers For Marseilles** - South Africa; Isoken - Nigeria; In My Country (2017 film) - Nigeria; The Blessed Vost - Algeria; Cross Roads - Nigeria; The Road to Sunrise - Malawi; Siembamba - South Africa; A Hotel Called Memory - Nigeria; Sidechic Gang - Ghana; Lost Café - Nigeria	**Frank Rajah Arase** - In My Country; Jade Osiberu - Isoken; Michael Mathews - Five Fingers For Marseilles; Sofia Djama - The Blessed Vost; Oluseyi Siwoku - Cross Roads; Shemu Joyah - The Road to Sunrise; Darrell Roodt - Siembamba; Akin Omotoso - A Hotel Called Memory; Peter Kofi Sedufia - Sidechic Gang; Kenneth Gyang - The Lost Café
Best Actor in a leading role	Best Actress in a leading role
**Richard Mofe Damijo** - Cross Roads; Vuyo Dabula - Five Fingers for Marseilles; Sam Dede - In My Country; Sami Bouajila - The Blessed Vost; OC Ukeje - Potato Potahto; Chris Attoh - Esohe; Oros Mampofu - Lucky Specials; Frank Donga - Hakkunde	**Dakore Akande** - Isoken; Kate Henshaw - Roti; Reine Swart - Siembamba; Okawa Shaznay - In My Country; Nana Ama McBrown, Lydia Forson and Sika Osei - Sidechic Gang; Mariam Phiri – The Road To Sunrise; Tunde Aladese – Lost Café; Joselyn Dumas – Potato Potahto
Best Actor in a Supporting Role	Best Actress in a Supporting Role
**Gideon Okeke** – Cross Roads; Seun Ajayi – Ojukokoro; Lionel Newton – Pop Lock ‘N’ Roll; Akah Nnani – Banana Island Ghost; Richard Lukunku – Lucky Specials	**Joke Silva** – Potato Potahto; Sika Osei – In Line; Sivenathi Mabuya – Lucky Specials; Rahama Sadau – Hakkunde; Toyin Abraham - Esohe
Achievement in Costume Design	Achievement in Makeup
**Isoken**; Icheke Oku; Cross Roads; Esohe; Five Fingers for Marseilles	**Icheke Oku**; Siembamba; Five Fingers for Marseilles; Esohe; The Road To Sunshine
Achievement in Cinematography	Achievement in Production Design
**Five Fingers for Marseilles**; The Road To Sunshine; The Lost Café; The Blessed Vost; Siembamba	**Five Fingers for Marseilles**; Kada River; Tatu; In My Country; Cross Roads
Achievement in Editing	Achievement in Screenplay
**Hotel Called Memory**; Pop Lock ‘N’ Roll; While We Live – Burkina Faso/Sweden; Lucky Specials; The Blessed Vost	**Hakkunde**; The Women; Potato Potahto; Ojukokoro; Five Fingers For Marseilles; The Lost Café
Best Film in An African Language	Best Nigerian Film
**Five Fingers For Marseilles** – South Africa; Mansoor – Nigeria; Icheke Oku – Nigeria; Agwaetiti Obiuto – Nigeria; Nyasaland – Malawi; Tunu – Tanzania	**Isoken**; Cross Roads; In My Country; Hotel Called Memory; Ojukokoro; Lost Café; Icheke Oku
Best Short Film	Best Animation
**Tikitat Soulima** – Morocco; Dem Dem – Senegal/Belgium; Zenith – Cameroon/USA; It Rains on Ouga – Burkina Faso; In Shadows – Kenya; Coat of Harm – Nigeria; Nice, Very Nice – Algeria; Visions (Shaitan, Buruja, Brood) – Nigeria; Fallou – Senegal; Still Water Runs Deep – Nigeria/USA	**Belly Flop** – South Africa; Group Photo – Nigeria; Untitled – Ghana; Crush – Nigeria
Best Documentary	Best Film by an African Living Abroad
**Uncertain Future** – Burundi; Bigger Than Africa – Nigeria/USA; Winnie – South Africa; Boxing Libreville – Gabon; Silas – South Africa/Kenya; When Babies Don't Come – South Africa; We Came In Sprint Carts – South Africa	**Alexandra** – Nigeria/USA; Minister – Nigeria/Italy; Low Lifes And High Hopes – Nigeria/Austria
Best Diaspora Short	Best Diaspora Documentary
**Torments of Love** - Guadeloupe; Baby Steps – USA; Intercept - USA	**Barrows: Freedom Fighter** - Barbados; Evolutionary Blues: West Oakland's Music Legacy - USA; Sammy Davis Jr. – I Gotta Be Me - USA
Best Diaspora Feature	Best Soundtrack
**Angelica** - Puerto Rico; Love Jacked - Canada; The Birth of a Nation (2016 film) - USA; Charlie: La Vie Magnifique Charlie - USA	**Hotel Called Memory**; The Road To Sunshine; Tatu; Isoken; Siembamba
Best Visual Effects	Best Sound
**Lucky Specials**; Siembamba; Icheke Oku; Esohe; Kada River	**Hotel Called Memory**; The Lost Café; The Road To Sunshine; Pop Lock ‘N’ Roll; Sidechic Gang
Most Promising Actor	Best First Feature Film by a Director
**Anine Lansari** – The Blessed Vost; Patrick Dibuah – Banana Island Ghost; Austin Enabulele – In My Country; Cindy Sanyu – Bella; Maurice Paige – Pop Lock ‘N’ Roll; Nichole Ozioma Banna – Icheke Oku; Zainab Balogun – Sylvia	**Five Fingers for Marseilles- Michael Mathews** – South Africa; My Mothers Story – Flora Suya- Malawi; Ogwuetiti Obiuto – Onyeka Nwelue – Nigeria; Isoken – Jadesola Osiberu - Nigeria; 18 Hours – Njue Kevin – Kenya; Banana Island Ghost – BB Sasore - Nigeria; The Blessed Vost – Sefia Djama – Algeria
Achievement in Editing
**Hotel Called Memory**; Pop Lock ‘N’ Roll; Lucky Specials; The Blessed Vost; Siembamba
