= Africa Movie Academy Award for Best Diaspora Documentary =

The Africa Movie Academy Award for Best Diaspora Documentary is an annual merit by the Africa Film Academy to reward the best diaspora documentaries for the year. Prior to the creation of the category in 2011, diaspora documentaries submitted normally compete with African documentaries for the Best Documentary category.

Best Diaspora Documentary
Year	Documentary	Recipient	Result
2011	Stubborn as a Mule	Miller Bargeron Jr & Arcelous Deiels	Won
2011	Momentum	Zeinabu Irene Davis	Nominated
2011	If Not Now	Louis Haggart	Nominated
2011	Motherland	Owen Alik Shahadah	Nominated
2011	Changement	Chiara Cavallazi	Nominated
2012	The Education of Auma Obama		Won
2012	White Wash		Nominated
2012	Almendron Mi Corazon		Nominated
2012	All Me: The Life And Times Of Winfred Hubert		Nominated
2013	Fan Do Brasil		Won
2013	My Thiero Boys		Nominated
2013	Red, White, Black And Blue		Nominated
2014	Through a Lens Darkly: Black Photographers and the Emergence of a People		Won
2014	Finding Samuel Lowe: From Harlem to China		Nominated
2014	Freedom Summer		Nominated
2014	No Bois Man, No Frad		Nominated
2015	The Black Panthers: Vanguard of the Revolution		Won
2015	Jimmy Goes To Nollywood		Nominated
2015	Bound: Africans Vs African Americans		Nominated
2015	Black Panther Woman		Nominated
2016	Spirits of Rebellion		Won
2016	America’s Blues		Nominated
2016	Can You Dig This		Nominated
2017	13th (film)		Won
2017	I Am Not Your Negro		Nominated
2017	The Vietnam War (TV series)		Nominated
2017	Horace Tapscott, Musical Griot		Nominated
2018	Barrows: Freedom Fighter		Won
2018	I Gotta Be Me (webseries)		Nominated
2018	Evolutionary Blues		Nominated
2019	My Friend Fela		Won
2019	Wax Print 1 FABRIC, 4 continent		Nominated
2019	Drugs as Weapons Against Us		Nominated
2019	Dare to Dream		Nominated
2019	The Guardian of No Return		Nominated
2020	Becoming Black		Won
2020	Revolution From Afar		Nominated
2020	Meeting My Father		Nominated
2020	If Objects Could Speak		Nominated
2021	African Redemption: the Life of Marcus Garvey		Won
2021	Akwaaba		Nominated
2021	Race Today Documentary		Nominated
