= My Friend Fela =

2019 Brazilian documentary film

- official poster
- Original title: Meu Amigo Fela
- Directed by: Joel Zito Araújo
- Written by: Joel Zito Araújo
- Produced by: Luiza Botelho Almeida
- Starring: Fela Kuti; Carlos Moore
- Cinematography: Cleumo Segond
- Edited by: Isabel Castro
- Release date: 7 November 2019
- Running time: 94 minutes
- Countries: Brazil; Nigeria
- Language: Portuguese

My Friend Fela, (Portuguese: Meu Amigo Fela), is a 2019 Brazilian biographical documentary film directed by Joel Zito Araújo and produced by Luiza Botelho Almeida. The film was influenced by Fela Kuti, an Afrobeat pioneer and activist from Nigeria.

The film received positive reviews and won several awards at international film festivals.

== Cast ==
- Fela Kuti as himself
- Carlos Moore as himself

== Accolades ==
- Africa Movie Academy Awards for Best Diaspora Documentary.
