= Rico Verhoeven =

Dutch kickboxer

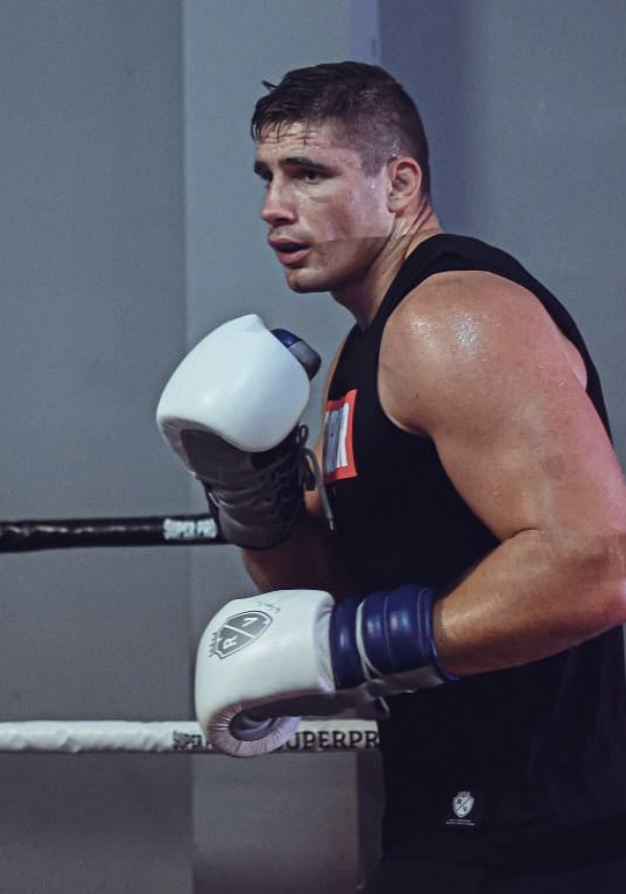
- Verhoeven in 2020
- Born: Ricardo Verhoeven; 10 April 1989 (age 37); Bergen op Zoom, Netherlands
- Other names: Prince of Kickboxing (formerly); King of Kickboxing (currently)
- Height: 1.96 m (6 ft 5 in)
- Weight: 123 kg (271 lb; 19 st 5 lb)
- Division: Heavyweight
- Reach: 77 in (196 cm)
- Style: Kickboxing, Kyokushin
- Team: Superpro Sportcenter
- Trainer: Dennis Krauweel
- Years active: 2004–present

Professional boxing record
- Total: 2
- Wins: 1
- By knockout: 1
- Losses: 1

Kickboxing record
- Total: 76
- Wins: 66
- By knockout: 21
- Losses: 10
- By knockout: 2

Mixed martial arts record
- Total: 1
- Wins: 1
- By knockout: 1
- Losses: 0

Other information
- Website: www.ricoverhoeven.com
- Boxing record from BoxRec
- Mixed martial arts record from Sherdog
- Last updated on: 29 October 2022

Ricardo "Rico" Verhoeven (pronounced [riˈkɑrdoː ˈrikoː vɛrˈɦuvən]; born 10 April 1989) is a Dutch professional kickboxer, professional boxer and mixed martial artist. He formerly competed in the Heavyweight division of GLORY, where he was the promotion's longest-reigning Heavyweight Champion, while also defending the title a record thirteen times. A professional since 2004, he also competed in K-1, It's Showtime and SUPERKOMBAT. He challenged for the WBC heavyweight title in a boxing match at the Giza Plateau, Egypt, in 2026. Verhoeven has been continually ranked as the number one heavyweight kickboxer in the world by Combat Press since September 2014, when the rankings were first established.

Verhoeven has been regarded as one of the greatest kickboxers of all time and held the Glory heavyweight title for 4,220 days, equivalent to over 11 years, winning 26 straight fights under the GLORY banner as champion. Verhoeven holds GLORY's record in most wins in title bouts (14), the most consecutive title defenses (13), the most wins (28), and the longest winning streak (27), while also tying in the record of the promotion's most bouts (29).

== Early life ==
Rico Verhoeven was born in Bergen op Zoom, Netherlands. He began learning martial arts at age one, starting with Kyokushin. He was trained by his father, a karate black belt. After transitioning into kickboxing, Verhoeven began training at the age of seven and started competing against adults when he was 16 years old, due to his large size.

He has trained mainly in Zevenbergen under Dennis Krauweel at Superpro Sportcenter, with fellow kickboxers Benjamin Adegbuyi, Albert Kraus and Alviar Lima.

== Professional kickboxing career ==
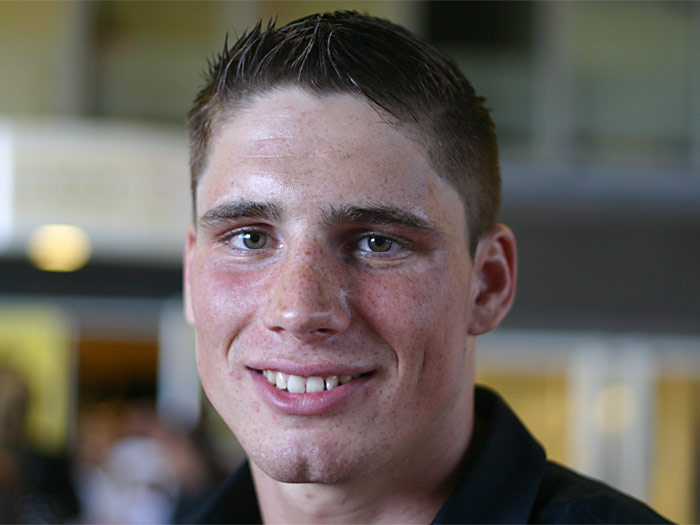
Verhoeven in 2009

=== Glory ===
After competing in K-1, It's Showtime and SUPERKOMBAT, Verhoeven signed with Glory World Series.

He was drawn against Russian mixed martial artist Sergei Kharitonov at the opening round of the sixteen-man 2012 Glory Heavyweight Grand Slam held at Glory 4: Tokyo - 2012 Heavyweight Grand Slam in Saitama, Japan on 31 December 2012. As he was leading the judges' scorecards after the first two, two-minute rounds, he advanced to the quarter-finals where he lost out to the eventual tournament winner, his countryman Semmy Schilt by the same margin.

He defeated Jhonata Diniz via unanimous decision at Glory 7: Milan in Milan, Italy on 20 April 2013.

He rematched Errol Zimmerman at Glory 9: New York - 2013 95kg Slam in New York City on 22 June 2013. Despite being deducted a point for rabbit punching in round one, he outworked and outstruck Zimmerman for three rounds and won by unanimous decision.

==== Ghiță rivalry ====
He won the Glory 11: Chicago - Heavyweight World Championship Tournament in Hoffman Estates, Illinois, United States in October 2013. After taking a majority decision over Gökhan Saki in the semi-finals, and scoring a knockdown in round one, he beat Daniel Ghiță by unanimous decision in the final.

Rico further established himself by defeating Peter Aerts by split decision in the main event of Glory 13: Tokyo - Welterweight World Championship Tournament in Tokyo, Japan on 21 December 2013.

He rematched and defeated Daniel Ghiță via unanimous decision in a bout for the vacant Glory Heavyweight (+95 kg/209 lb) Championship at Glory 17: Los Angeles in Inglewood, California, US on June 21, 2014.

==== Zimmerman trilogy ====
Verhoeven was scheduled to make the first defense of his Glory Heavyweight title against Errol Zimmerman at Glory 19: Virginia, in what would be their trilogy match. Each fighter had previously won once, Verhoeven by decision, and Zimmerman by knockout.

Verhoeven kept to out fighting, looking to deal damage with body kicks and straight shots, while keeping his opponent at distance with snap kicks and teep kicks. With a minute left in the first round, both fighters engaged in a wild exchange, with Errol being dropped at the end of it. He was once again dropped with a front kick, with half a minute left in the round. The fight ended in a technical knockout, as Zimmerman injured his left knee, following a missed spinning back kick.

==== Adegbuyi fights ====
For his second title defense, Verhoeven was scheduled to fight the former SUPERKOMBAT Heavyweight GP winner Benjamin Adegbuyi at Glory 22: Lille. Adegebuyi managed to stun the champion in the first round, before Verhoeven took over in the second. He dominated the rest of the affair, picking up in both volume and pace as the fight went on, while Adegbuyi slowed down. Rico won the fight by unanimous decision (49–47, 49–47 and 50–45).

After this loss, Adegbuyi won the 2015 Glory Heavyweight Contender Tournament, to once again earn a title shot at Glory 26: Amsterdam, six months after their first fight. The second fight ended with a first-round KO, with Verhoeven quickly overwhelming his opponent and knocking him out with right hook. After this fight, Verhoeven changed his nickname from "Prince of Kickboxing" to "King of Kickboxing".

Verhoeven was scheduled to defend his title for the fourth time just three months later, at Glory 28: Paris, against the newly crowned FFC Heavyweight champion Mladen Brestovac. Just as with his two previous title bouts against Benjamin Adegbuyi, Verhoeven was thoroughly dominant, despite a slow first round which he lost with one of the judges. He won the fight by unanimous decision (49–46, 50–45, 50–45).

For his fifth consecutive title defense, Verhoeven was to face the Brazilian Anderson Braddock Silva at Glory 33: New Jersey. Verhoeven began the fight with several leg kicks, which he would keep throwing for the duration of the bout, landing 16 kicks from 22 attempts in the first round alone. Early in the second round, he knocked Silva down with an inside right leg kick. After 40 seconds in the second round, Verhoeven once again knocked Silva down, this time with a left leg head kick. He would knock Silva down for the third time with five seconds left in the second round, forcing the referee to wave the fight off.

==== Verhoeven vs. Hari ====
At the 10 December 2016 bout against former world champion Badr Hari at GLORY Collision in Oberhausen, Germany, Hari promised he would knock out Verhoeven in the first round. Intending to keep his promise, Hari came out aggressively in the first round, opening a cut on Verhoeven's nose early in the fight. Hari won the first round. The GLORY heavyweight champion returned more aggressive in the second round, but the fight ended by an injury at Hari's arm after which he couldn't continue the fight. Verhoeven scored the 50th victory of his kickboxing career with a TKO.

After defeating Hari, Glory was unable to find an appropriate opponent for Verhoeven, and so arranged for him to fight the reigning Enfusion Super Heavyweight champion Ismael Lazaar in a non-title fight at Glory 41: Holland. Verhoeven dominated the fight, with Lazaar being unable to cover the distance, being six inches shorter than the champion. He won the fight by unanimous decision. Lazaar would later fail a doping test and was suspended for four years.

Glory booked Verhoeven in a non-title match against Antônio Silva, in what the website Bloody Elbow called a "gross mismatch". Silva was given a 35-1 odds to win. Verhoeven abandoned his usual strategy of outfighting, unleashing several combinations on the MMA fighter. The fight ended in a technical knockout, after Rico knocked Silva down with a head kick 43 seconds into the second round.

==== Verhoeven vs. Ben Saddik ====
Verhoeven fought Jamal Ben Saddik in defense of Glory heavyweight title, on 9 December 2017. In a fight that has been called the biggest fight in kickboxing history due to the size of the contestants, with Jamal being 6' 9", 280 lbs and Rico himself at 6' 5", 260 lbs. Jamal defeated a young Rico in their first meeting in 2011, but since then has had a record of 11 wins to 6 losses, while Rico climbed the P4P rankings and established himself as a kickboxing world champion.

Ben Saddik found success early on in the fight, before Verhoeven took over as the fight went on, winning by a fifth-round TKO.

Verhoeven was again scheduled to defend his title at Glory 54: Birmingham, in a rematch with Mladen Brestovac. Verhoeven had won five straight fights since their first meeting, while Brestovac came into the fight on a three fight winning streak. The champion stuck to his patented outfighting, damaging the challenger with low kicks and front kicks from distance early, and unleashing hand combinations later in the fight. Verhoeven won a comfortable unanimous decision with 50–45 on all five scorecards.

He was scheduled to defend his title for a record setting eighth time at Glory 59: Amsterdam, when he faced the WGP Heavyweight champion Guto Inocente. Inocente would use several illegal moves during the fight, such as a foot sweep and a judo throw, however, Verhoeven would again dominate the bout, winning all five rounds on each of the judges scorecards.

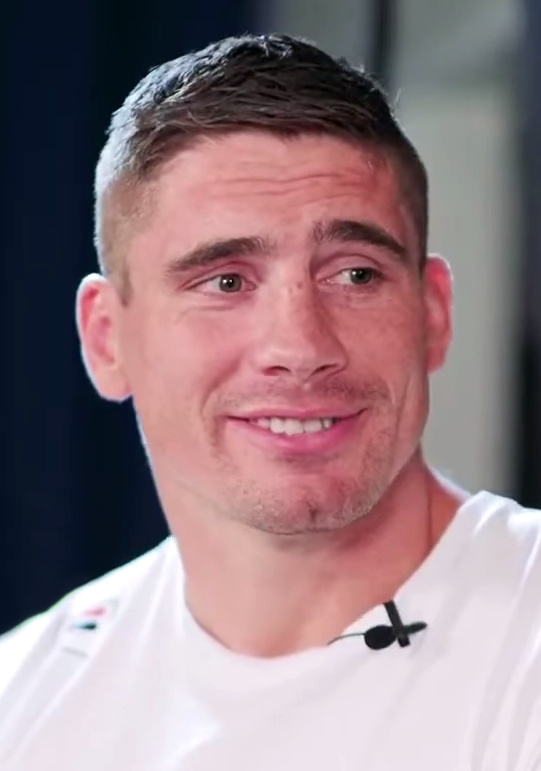
Verhoeven in 2020

==== Verhoeven vs. Hari II ====
For his ninth title defense, Verhoeven was set to fight a rematch with Badr Hari at Glory 74: Arnhem. Since their first fight, Hari had served a prison sentence, and had only fought once in the meantime, he won against Hesdy Gerges by unanimous decision but later turned into a no-contest.

The fight itself took place in the sold out GelreDome, in front of 30,000 fans. Verhoeven began the fight in an uncharacteristically aggressive fashion, and was knocked down at the 1:40 minute mark of the first round. He found more success in the second round, but was once again knocked down with a head kick in the third round. The fight ended in the third round, with Verhoeven winning by TKO, after Hari broke his ankle with a missed kick.

Aside from selling out the arena, the rematch also drew 3.5 million viewers, an estimated 53% of the live television audience in the Netherlands, which was the second highest viewership of a live sports broadcast, in Dutch television history.

==== Glory 77 ====
It was revealed by Glory in October 2020 that Verhoeven would fight a trilogy match with Jamal Ben Saddik in early 2021, although the exact date and event weren't announced. Their fight was a rubber match, as both fighters held a TKO win over the other. Their fight was later scheduled for Glory 77 on 30 January 2021. 11 days before the event, Ben Saddik withdrew due to a back injury. Accordingly, Verhoeven was scheduled to take part in a four-man heavyweight tournament, facing Hesdy Gerges in the semifinals, after Gerges called Verhoeven out. He won the semifinal bout against Hesdy Gerges by unanimous decision, and the final bout against Tarik Khbabez by TKO, after Khbabez retired at the end of the first round.

==== Verhoeven vs. Ben Saddik III ====
It was announced on 23 August 2021, that Verhoeven would make the tenth defense of his Glory Heavyweight Championship against the 2010 K-1 World Grand Prix winner Alistair Overeem. The fight was scheduled for Glory: Collision 3 on 23 October 2021. On 7 October it was revealed that Overeem had suffered an injury in training and was forced to withdraw from the bout. Overeem was replaced by Jamal Ben Saddik, who stepped in on two-weeks notice. Verhoeven defeated Ben Saddik by TKO in the fourth round.

==== Verhoeven vs. Gerges IV ====
On 12 April 2022, it was announced that Verhoeven's next fight would take place at the inaugural "HIT IT" event, a sports and live entertainment show. Although it was initially assumed that the fight would be an exhibition bout, on June 2 it was revealed that he would face the former It's Showtime World Heavyweight champion Hesdy Gerges for the fourth time in his professional career and who he had beaten in all three of their previous meetings. The quadrilogy bout headlined the "HIT IT" event, which took place on 29 October 2022, at the Rotterdam Ahoy. Verhoeven won the fight by a fifth-round technical knockout.

==== Verhoeven vs. Osaro ====
Verhoeven was expected to make his eleventh Glory heavyweight title defense against Antonio Plazibat. The title bout was initially supposed to take place in spring 2023, but was postponed after Verhoeven suffered a knee injury in training. As Plazibat suffered a stoppage loss to Tariq Osaro in an interim Glory Heavyweight Championship bout at Glory: Collision 5 on 17 June 2023, Verhoeven was rescheduled to face him instead. The title unification bout took place at Glory: Collision 6 on 4 November 2023. Verhoeven won the fight by unanimous decision (49–47, 50–46, and 50–45 x3).

==== GLORY Heavyweight Grand Prix ====
Verhoeven was scheduled to face Sofian Laidouni in the quarterfinals of the Glory Heavyweight Grand Prix on 9 March 2024. He won the fight by a routine unanimous decision. Verhoeven next faced Nabil Khachab in the semifinal bout of the one-day tournament. He likewise won the fight by unanimous decision. Verhoeven captured the tournament title, as well as the $500,000 prize, with a second-round technical knockout of Levi Rigters.

==== GLORY: Collision 7 ====
In September 2024 it was reported that Verhoeven would defend his Glory heavyweight title at Collision 7 on 7 December 2024, at GelreDome in Arnhem, Netherlands against the winner of the Glory 95 main event bout between Levi Rigters vs Bahram Rajabzadeh. On 8 November 2024, it was announced that Verhoeven was scheduled to face Rigters. Verhoeven won the fight by unanimous decision.

==== GLORY 100: Duel of Legends ====
In March 2025, it was reported that Verhoeven would defend his Glory heavyweight title against former two-time Glory Light Heavyweight Champion Artem Vakhitov at Glory 100 on 14 June 2025. Verhoeven won the fight by unanimous decision.

Verhoeven announced he was vacating the Glory Heavyweight title on 20 November 2025, after not renewing his contract with the promotion.

== Professional boxing career ==
Verhoeven was scheduled to make his professional boxing debut against Nikolaj Falin at Mix Fight Gala XV in Darmstadt, Germany on 26 April 2014 but his opponent was changed to János Finfera for undisclosed reasons. Verhoeven defeated the Hungarian by second-round knockout.

=== Verhoeven vs. Usyk ===
Verhoeven challenged Oleksandr Usyk for his WBC heavyweight title in Giza, Egypt, on 23 May 2026. Verhoeven lost by TKO in the 11th round due to a controversial stoppage by the referee. Going into the round, two judges scored the fight even 95–95, with the other judge scoring 96–94 in favor of Verhoeven. The following day, Verhoeven's team lodged a formal protest against the result, calling for an apology from the officials and an immediate rematch. A commission agreed the fight was stopped after the bell, and that Verhoeven showed no signs of confusion or disorientation after the stoppage, although they decided not to change the result of the fight.

== Professional mixed martial arts career ==
Verhoeven made his MMA pro debut at RXF 20: Verhoeven vs. Bogutzki in Sibiu, Romania on 19 October 2015 defeating Viktor Bogutzki by TKO in the 1st round due to punches. Prior to his MMA debut he trained in San Jose, California at the American Kickboxing Academy, where he trained with fighters like Daniel Cormier and Jon Fitch.

== Fighting style ==
Verhoeven is creative and focuses a lot on technicality. He has a wide arsenal of attacks, most notably his powerful low kicks, and a tight defense. He also worked closely with former two-time heavyweight boxing world champion Tyson Fury, whom he credits with turning his jab into the highly effective weapon it is now.

== Personal life ==
Verhoeven has a YouTube channel. He is friends with 2017 World's Strongest Man Eddie Hall and former UFC Heavyweight Champion Tom Aspinall. They regularly appear in each other's YouTube videos. As of September 2024, Verhoeven was engaged to Naomy van Beem. Verhoeven and his ex-wife, Jacky Duchenne, have three children.

=== Acting ===
Verhoeven made his film debut in a small role opposite Alain Moussi in the sequel Kickboxer: Retaliation.

=== Documentary ===
In 2022, the four-part Amazon Prime Video docu-series RICO: Dream Big followed Verhoeven in his fighting career and his attempts to break through as an actor in Hollywood.

== Kickboxing record ==
Kickboxing record
66 wins (21 (T)KOs), 10 losses
Date	Result	Opponent	Event	Location	Method	Round	Time
2025-06-14	Win	(Russia) Artem Vakhitov	Glory 100	Rotterdam, Netherlands	Decision (unanimous)	5	3:00
Retains the Glory Heavyweight Championship.
2024-12-07	Win	(Netherlands) Levi Rigters	Glory Collision 7	Arnhem, Netherlands	Decision (unanimous)	5	3:00
Retains the Glory Heavyweight Championship.
2024-03-09	Win	(Netherlands) Levi Rigters	Glory Heavyweight Grand Prix, Final	Arnhem, Netherlands	TKO (4 knockdowns)	2	2:59
Wins the 2024 Glory Heavyweight Grand Prix.
2024-03-09	Win	(Morocco) Nabil Khachab	Glory Heavyweight Grand Prix, Semifinals	Arnhem, Netherlands	Decision (unanimous)	3	3:00
2024-03-09	Win	(France) Sofian Laidouni	Glory Heavyweight Grand Prix, Quarterfinals	Arnhem, Netherlands	Decision (unanimous)	3	3:00
2023-11-04	Win	(Nigeria) Tariq Osaro	Glory: Collision 6	Arnhem, Netherlands	Decision (unanimous)	5	3:00
Retains the Glory Heavyweight Championship.
2022-10-29	Win	(Netherlands) Hesdy Gerges	HIT IT	Rotterdam, Netherlands	TKO (punches)	5	1:58
2021-10-23	Win	(Morocco) Jamal Ben Saddik	Glory Collision 3	Arnhem, Netherlands	TKO (punches)	4	0:56
Retains the Glory Heavyweight Championship.
2021-01-30	Win	(Morocco) Tarik Khbabez	Glory 77: Rotterdam Final	Rotterdam, Netherlands	TKO (corner stoppage/injury)	1	3:00
Wins the Glory 77 Heavyweight Tournament.
2021-01-30	Win	(Netherlands) Hesdy Gerges	Glory 77: Rotterdam Semi Final	Rotterdam, Netherlands	Decision (unanimous)	3	3:00
2019-12-21	Win	(Morocco) Badr Hari	Glory Collision 2	Arnhem, Netherlands	TKO (leg injury)	3	0:59
Retains the Glory Heavyweight Championship.
2018-09-29	Win	(Brazil) Guto Inocente	Glory 59: Amsterdam	Amsterdam, Netherlands	Decision (unanimous)	5	3:00
Retains the Glory Heavyweight Championship.
2018-06-02	Win	(Croatia) Mladen Brestovac	Glory 54: Birmingham	Birmingham, England	Decision (unanimous)	5	3:00
Retains the Glory Heavyweight Championship.
2017-12-09	Win	(Morocco) Jamal Ben Saddik	Glory 49: Rotterdam	Rotterdam, Netherlands	TKO (head kick and punches)	5	1:10
Retains the Glory Heavyweight Championship.
2017-10-14	Win	(Brazil) Antônio Silva	Glory 46: China	Guangzhou, China	TKO (referee stoppage)	2	0:43
2017-05-20	Win	(Morocco) Ismael Lazaar	Glory 41: Holland	Den Bosch, Netherlands	Decision (unanimous)	5	3:00
2016-12-10	Win	(Morocco) Badr Hari	Glory 36: Oberhausen	Oberhausen, Germany	TKO (arm injury)	2	1:22
2016-09-09	Win	(Brazil) Anderson Silva	Glory 33: New Jersey	Trenton, New Jersey, USA	TKO (3 knockdowns rule)	2	2:57
Retains the Glory Heavyweight Championship.
2016-03-12	Win	(Croatia) Mladen Brestovac	Glory 28: Paris	Paris, France	Decision (unanimous)	5	3:00
Retains the Glory Heavyweight Championship.
2015-12-04	Win	(Romania) Benjamin Adegbuyi	Glory 26: Amsterdam	Amsterdam, Netherlands	KO (right hook)	1	2:12
Retains the Glory Heavyweight Championship.
2015-06-05	Win	(Romania) Benjamin Adegbuyi	Glory 22: Lille	Lille, France	Decision (unanimous)	5	3:00
Retains the Glory Heavyweight Championship.
2015-02-06	Win	(Netherlands) Errol Zimmerman	Glory 19: Virginia	Hampton, Virginia, United States	TKO (leg injury)	2	2:17
Retains the Glory Heavyweight Championship.
2015-01-03	Loss	(Belarus) Andrey Gerasimchuk	Kunlun Fight 15	Nanjing, China	Decision (unanimous)	3	3:00
2014-06-21	Win	(Romania) Daniel Ghiță	Glory 17: Los Angeles	Inglewood, California, USA	Decision (unanimous)	5	3:00
Wins the Glory Heavyweight Championship.
2013-12-21	Win	(Netherlands) Peter Aerts	Glory 13: Tokyo	Tokyo, Japan	Decision (split)	3	3:00
2013-10-12	Win	(Romania) Daniel Ghiță	Glory 11: Chicago - Heavyweight World Championship Tournament, Final	Hoffman Estates, Illinois, USA	Decision (unanimous)	3	3:00
Wins the Glory Heavyweight World Championship Tournament.
2013-10-12	Win	(Turkey) Gökhan Saki	Glory 11: Chicago - Heavyweight World Championship Tournament, Semi Finals	Hoffman Estates, Illinois, USA	Decision (majority)	3	3:00
2013-06-22	Win	(Netherlands) Errol Zimmerman	Glory 9: New York	New York City, New York, USA	Decision (majority)	3	3:00
2013-04-20	Win	(Brazil) Jhonata Diniz	Glory 7: Milan	Milan, Italy	Decision (unanimous)	3	3:00
2012-12-31	Loss	(Netherlands) Semmy Schilt	Glory 4: Tokyo - Heavyweight Grand Slam Tournament, Quarter Finals	Saitama, Japan	Decision (unanimous)	2	2:00
2012-12-31	Win	(Russia) Sergei Kharitonov	Glory 4: Tokyo - Heavyweight Grand Slam Tournament, First Round	Saitama, Japan	Decision (unanimous)	2	2:00
2012-06-30	Win	(Netherlands) Hesdy Gerges	Music Hall & BFN Group present: It's Showtime 57 & 58	Brussels, Belgium	Decision	3	3:00
2012-05-27	Loss	(Ukraine) Serhiy Lashchenko	K-1 World MAX 2012 World Championship Tournament Final 16, Super Fight	Madrid, Spain	Extra round decision (split)	4	3:00
2012-03-17	Win	(Australia) Ben Edwards	Capital Punishment 5	Canberra, Australia	Decision	3	3:00
2012-01-28	Loss	(Netherlands) Errol Zimmerman	It's Showtime 2012 in Leeuwarden	Leeuwarden, Netherlands	KO (left uppercut)	1	0:59
2011-11-17	Win	(Netherlands) Hesdy Gerges	SUPERKOMBAT Fight Club	Oradea, Romania	Decision (split)	3	3:00
2011-06-18	Win	(Netherlands) Raemon Welboren	Thaiboksgala BlokhuispoortKickboxing	Leeuwarden, Netherlands	Decision	3	3:00
2011-05-21	Win	(United States) Justice Smith	SUPERKOMBAT World Grand Prix I 2011, Reserve Fight	Bucharest, Romania	TKO (referee stoppage)	1	N/A
2011-03-06	Loss	(Morocco) Jamal Ben Saddik	It's Showtime Sporthallen Zuid	Amsterdam, Netherlands	TKO (corner stoppage)	2	1:00
2010-12-18	Win	(Spain) Frank Muñoz	Fightclub presents: It's Showtime 2010	Amsterdam, Netherlands	Decision (unanimous)	3	3:00
2010-10-09	Win	(Netherlands) Michael Duut	Ring Rage Part 5	Assen, Netherlands	Decision	3	3:00
2010-09-12	Win	(Netherlands) Ricardo van den Bos	Fightingstars presents: It's Showtime 2010	Amsterdam, Netherlands	Decision (unanimous)	3	3:00
2010-05-29	Win	(Bosnia and Herzegovina) Dzevad Poturak	It's Showtime 2010 Amsterdam	Amsterdam, Netherlands	Decision (unanimous)	3	3:00
2010-03-07	Win	(Croatia) Alex Novovic	Time For Action presents: Team SuperPro 10 Year Anniversary	Nijmegen, Netherlands	TKO (referee stoppage)	2	3:00
2010-01-30	Win	(Turkey) Mutlu Karabulut	Beast of the East	Zutphen, Netherlands	Decision (unanimous)	3	3:00
2009-11-21	Win	(Netherlands) Jantje Siersema	It's Showtime 2009 Barneveld	Barneveld, Netherlands	KO (left knee to the body)	1	N/A
2009-10-24	Loss	(Belgium) Rustemi Kreshnik	It's Showtime 2009 Lommel	Lommel, Belgium	Extra round decision	4	3:00
2009-08-11	Loss	(France) Brice Guidon	K-1 World GP 2009 Tokyo, Quarter Finals	Tokyo, Japan	Decision	3	3:00
2009-08-29	Win	(Hungary) Gábor Meiszter	It's Showtime 2009 Budapest	Budapest, Hungary	Decision	3	3:00
2009-06-13	Loss	(Suriname) Ismael Londt	Gentlemen Promotions	Tilburg, Netherlands	Decision (unanimous)	3	3:00
2009-05-16	Win	(Netherlands) Ricardo Fyeet	It's Showtime 2009 Amsterdam	Amsterdam, Netherlands	Decision	3	3:00
2009-03-14	Win	(Croatia) Petar Majstorovic	Oktagon presents: It's Showtime 2009	Milan, Italy	Decision	3	3:00
2009-02-09	Win	(Belgium) Filip Verlinden	Fights at the Border presents: It's Showtime 2009	Antwerp, Belgium	Decision	3	3:00
2008-11-29	Win	(Netherlands) Dennis Stolzenbach	It's Showtime 2008 Eindhoven	Eindhoven, Netherlands	Decision	3	3:00
2008-08-09	Win	(Japan) Koichi Watanabe	K-1 World GP 2008 Hawaii, Super Fight	Honolulu, Hawaii	Decision	3	3:00
2008-04-26	Win	(Netherlands) Christiano Delgado	K-1 World GP 2008 Amsterdam, Opening Fight	Amsterdam, Netherlands	Decision	3	3:00
2008-02-17	Win	(Morocco) Redouan Abdelloui	K-1 MAX Netherlands 2008, Super Fight	Utrecht, Netherlands	Decision	3	3:00
2007-12-16	Win	(Poland) Brunon Sokołowski	Oss Muay Thai	Oss, Netherlands	Decision	3	3:00
2007-05-13	Loss	(Morocco) Said El Jajaui	Fight Night Veghel B Tournament, Quarter Finals	Veghel, Netherlands	Decision (unanimous)	3	2:00
2007-03-24	Win	(Hungary) Zoltán Tóth	WFCA Muay thai gala, Zuidwest hallen	Roosendaal, Netherlands	Decision (unanimous)	5	2:00
2006-10-15	Loss	(Netherlands) Brian Douwes	Top Team Beverwijk Muay thai gala	Beverwijk, Netherlands	Decision (unanimous)	5	2:00
2006-04-09	Win	(Morocco) Reduan Abdellaoui	K.O.C. III	Goes, Netherlands	Decision (unanimous)	3	1:30
2006-02-03	Win	(Netherlands) Chris van den Ouweland	Thaiboxing Gala, Zuidwesthallen	Roosendaal, Netherlands	KO	3	N/A
2005-11-26	Win	(Netherlands) Stijn van Tatenhove	Thaiboxing Gala, Zuidwesthallen	Roosendaal, Netherlands	Decision	3	2:00
2005-05-29	Win	(Netherlands) Sander Duyvis	Gala in Zonnehuis	Amsterdam, Netherlands	Decision	3	2:00
2005-04-30	Win	(Netherlands) Wilbert Dam	Impact in de Zuidwesthallen	Roosendaal, Netherlands	KO	2	1:56
Legend: Win Loss Draw/no contest Notes

== Professional boxing record ==
2 fights	1 win	1 loss
By knockout	1	1
By decision	0	0

No.	Result	Record	Opponent	Type	Round, time	Date	Location	Notes
2	Loss	1–1	Oleksandr Usyk	TKO	11 (12), 2:59	23 May 2026	Pyramids of Giza, Giza, Egypt	For WBC and The Ring heavyweight titles
1	Win	1–0	Janos Finfera	KO	2 (4), 1:40	26 Apr 2014	Boellenfalltor-Halle, Darmstadt, Germany	

== Mixed martial arts record ==
Professional record breakdown
1 match	1 win	0 losses
By knockout	1	0

Res.	Record	Opponent	Method	Event	Date	Round	Time	Location	Notes
Win	1–0	Viktor Bogutzki	TKO (punches)	Romanian Xtreme Fighting 20	October 19, 2015	1	2:11	Sibiu, Romania	

== Championships and accomplishments ==
- Glory
  - 2013 Glory Heavyweight (+95 kg/209 lb) World Championship Tournament Champion
  - 2014 Glory Heavyweight (+95 kg/209 lb) Championship (one time; former)
    - Thirteen successful title defenses
    - Most successful title defenses in Glory history (13)
  - 2017 Glory Fighter of the Year
  - 2017 Glory Knockout of the Year vs. Jamal Ben Saddik.
  - 2019 Glory Highlight of the Year
  - 2021 Glory 77 Heavyweight Tournament winner
  - 2021 Glory Fight of the Year (vs. Jamal Ben Saddik)
  - 2024 Glory Heavyweight Grand Prix Winner
  - 2024 Glory Fighter of the Year

Awards

- Combat Press
  - 2024 Fight of the Year (vs Levi Rigters II)
- Liverkick.com
  - 2017 Fighter of the Year
- Kickboxingplanet.com
  - 2016 Kickboxer of the Year
- BloodyElbow.com
  - 2013 Kickboxer of the Year

== Filmography ==
=== Film ===
Year	Title	Role	Notes
2015	Vechtershart	Tony Corella	
2018	De Film van Dylan Haegens	Diederik-Jan	
2018	Kickboxer: Retaliation	Moss	
2019	Don Diego Poeder - Fight, Honor, Legacy	Glory Heavy Weight Champion	
2023	Black Lotus	Matteo Donner	
2025	Den of Thieves 2: Pantera	Vigo	
TBA	Road House 2	TBA	Post-production

=== Television ===
Year	Title	Role	Notes
2015	Bluf	Davey	
2019	Hotboxin' with Mike Tyson	Himself	Episode: "Champions Henry Cejudo, Kamaru Usman, & Rico Verhoeven"
2019	Makkelijk Scoren	Huisdichter	
2022	RICO: Dream Big	Himself	Documentary; 4 episodes
2023	The First Years	Nico Veenboer, biology teacher	
2024	Het Sinterklaasjournaal	Meneer Spaargaren	

== See also ==
- List of male kickboxers
