= Africa Movie Academy Award for Best Diaspora Feature =

The Africa Movie Academy Award for Best Diaspora Feature is an annual merit by the Africa Film Academy to reward the best feature films by non-Africans for the year. It was introduced in the 2011 ceremony.

Best Diaspora Feature
Year	Film	Director	Result
2011	Suicide Dolls	Keith Shaw	Won
2011	Tested	Russell Costanzo	Nominated
2011	Nothing Less	Wayne Saunders	Nominated
2011	The Village	Wayne Saunders	Nominated
2012	Toussaint Louverture		Won
2012	Ghett'a Life		Nominated
2012	High Chicago		Nominated
2012	Elza		Nominated
2012	Better Mus' Come		Nominated
2012	Kinyanrwanda		Nominated
2013	Stones in the Sun		Won
2013	Against The Grain		Nominated
2013	Between Friends		Nominated
2014	Kingston Paradise		Won
2014	Tula the Revolt		Nominated
2014	AZU		Nominated
2014	Retrieval		Nominated
2015	Supremacy		Won
2015	Cru		Nominated
2015	Under the Starry Sky		Nominated
2016	Ben & Ara		Won
2016	America Is Still the Place		Nominated
2016	Luv Don’t Live Here		Nominated
2017	Birth of a Nation		Won
2017	West Indies Gang		Nominated
2017	Fences		Nominated
2017	Double Play		Nominated
2017	Moonlight		Nominated
2018	Angelica		Won
2018	Love Jacked		Nominated
2018	The Birth of a Nation		Nominated
2018	Charlie: La Vie Magnifique Charlie		Nominated
2019	Hero		Won
2019	Traffik		Nominated
2019	Olympia		Nominated
2019	Sprinter		Nominated
2019	Nine Nights		Nominated
2020	Joseph		Won
2020	Aiyai: Wrathful Soul		Nominated
2020	Lola		Nominated
2020	A Day With Jerusa		Nominated
2020	Black and Blue		Nominated
2021	Residue		Won
	Ride Share		Nominated
	Hal King		Nominated
