= The Volcano Disaster (film) =

2005 Bulgarian direct-to-video film

The Volcano Disaster (also called Volcano: Nature Unleashed or Nature Unleashed: Volcano) is a 2005 Bulgarian direct-to-video film by First Look Studios.

The film concerns a volcanologist who learns of an impending eruption at an Italian town and tries to warn the skeptic citizens. Unlike "traditional" disaster films, the eruption is predicted by supernatural rather than technological means. No seismometers are seen in the entire film.

== Summary ==
The film is about a young volcanologist named Russell Woods (Chris William Martin). In trying to help a village, Woods fails to save his wife Dee from falling into a lava flow.

Three months later, in an attempt to bring back memories of his late wife, Woods moves to an Italian town where Dee was born. While exploring Dee's birthplace, Woods is angrily confronted by Sylvia (Anna Elsa), the local school principal and the bus driver he met earlier, for trespassing. When Woods explains the situation, Sylvia begins to accept him.

Woods is directed to Father Dominic, the local church leader, for Dee's records. He also meets an eccentric mute girl, Angela (Sara Malakul Lane), who follows him but runs.

It is later learned that Angela's father was killed in a mining accident, and both she and her mother were struck by lightning. Her mother was killed, and Angela was clinically dead but was miraculously revived 20 minutes later. Angela can draw but cannot talk or write.

When trying to learn about Angela, Woods is knocked out by Dominic and warned that Angela is "evil" that she communicates with the dead. However, Woods continues to pursue the truth and learns that Angela's mother died the same day as Dee did.

Angela, at one point, tries to commit suicide but is rescued by Woods and Sylvia. Woods carries Angela to the hospital, where she is revived, and Dominic tries to perform an exorcism on her.

Woods eventually learns that Angela is trying to tell him of the unusual lunar cycles, and in the process, he learns about the impending eruption.

Dominic and the villagers are skeptical at first but are convinced when the volcano begins erupting. Woods leads the townspeople's escape, but Angela gets trapped. Right before Angela is rescued, she sees an apparition of Dee, and they smile at each other. Dee's spirit somehow transports her safely out of the way of the lava, making her appear right next to Woods.

Eventually, Dominic no longer treats Angela as evil, and Woods goes back to Dee's home, where he carves his name into a tree below Dee's name, and Angela tells him Dee will always be with him.

== Similarities with other films and criticism ==
Some viewers have noted the parallel between The Volcano Disaster and Dante's Peak, while others have criticized that the film was too derivative of Dante's Peak.

- In The Volcano Disaster, Woods' wife dies after falling into a lava stream; in Dante's Peak, Dalton's partner dies after being hit by a volcanic bomb.
- In The Volcano Disaster, Woods hugs Sylvia (who, like Dominic, is also an authority figure) at the end, suggesting that they may begin a romantic relationship; in Dante's Peak, Dalton develops a romantic interest with the female mayor.
- In both films, the protagonist deals with trying to convince a skeptical community of an impending eruption.

There is also a parallel with Volcano; in both films, the signs of volcanic activities is first found in a tunnel.
