= Kickboxer: Vengeance =

2016 American martial arts film

- Theatrical release poster
- Directed by: John Stockwell
- Written by: Dimitri Logothetis; Jim McGrath
- Produced by: Nicholas Celozzi; Ted Field; Dimitri Logothetis
- Starring: Dave Bautista; Alain Moussi; Gina Carano; Georges St-Pierre; Jean-Claude Van Damme
- Cinematography: Mateo Londono
- Edited by: Carsten Kurpanek; Chris A. Peterson
- Music by: Adam Dorn
- Production companies: Headmon Entertainment & Productions; Radar Pictures
- Distributed by: RLJ Entertainment
- Release dates: July 14, 2016 (FIFF); September 2, 2016 (United States)
- Running time: 90 minutes
- Country: United States
- Language: English
- Budget: $17 million
- Box office: $287,779

Kickboxer: Vengeance is a 2016 American martial arts film directed by John Stockwell, and starring Dave Bautista, Alain Moussi, Gina Carano, Georges St-Pierre, and Jean-Claude Van Damme. It is the sixth film in the Kickboxer franchise and also serves as a reboot. The film has a similar premise as the first film in the franchise, and follows Kurt Sloan (Moussi) who trains under Master Durand (Van Damme) to avenge his brother Eric's death. The film was released in select theaters and video on demand by RLJ Entertainment on September 2, 2016.

== Plot ==
Kurt Sloane goes to Thailand and heads to the martial arts compound of Tong Po. He is met with resistance by doorman Kavi. When Kurt pays Kavi to let him in, Kavi starts a fight with Kurt. However, Kurt is able to get the upper hand on Kavi and defeats him. Another compound fighter, Storm, struts his stuff and is able to beat Kurt. Later, Kavi attempts to steal Kurt's wallet. Kurt, noticing what Kavi was up to, tells him to return the wallet but lets him keep the money. That night, Crawford introduces Tong Po who shows his strength by using simple knees and elbows to break a stone statue. After a few battles between compound fighters, Tong returns inside to meet with his escorts. Later that night, Kurt wakes up and finds Tong Po. Discovering Kurt has pointed a gun at him, Tong Po tells Kurt that his brother was brave and a warrior where Kurt is a coward. Tong Po knocks Kurt out and Crawford informs Kurt that because of what he had attempted, the police have been called in to arrest him.

Flashbacks reveal that Eric Sloane has won the World Karate Championship. At a celebratory event at the Sloane Gym, fight promoter Marcia arrives and invites Eric to go to Thailand to fight in an underground match. Eric thinks that they can make more money and get their name known, while Kurt is extremely skeptical and attempts to talk Eric out of going. Eric, determined, has made up his mind and tells Kurt he is leaving. A while later, Kurt receives an envelope with Eric's championship medal and a ticket to Bangkok. Eric is scheduled to fight Tong Po. Meanwhile, Liu, a local Thai police officer, has been planning to stop the underground fights much to the chagrin of her superior, Wattona, who is on Marcia's payroll. When Kurt arrives in Thailand, he sees Eric being brutalized by Tong Po. Tong Po puts Eric in a headlock and breaks his neck, killing him. Liu and some officers show up, forcing everyone to disperse except for Kurt. At the coroners, Kurt confronts Marcia, blaming her for what had happened to Eric. Marcia tells him that it was Eric's choice. As Kurt lashes out at Marcia, he is stopped by police, who then escort him to meet Master Durand, Eric's Muay Thai trainer, who gives him Eric's money from the fight and then to the airport. Kurt is warned to leave Thailand and never come back. However, he ends up staying.

Returning to the present, the police take Kurt but they are stopped by Liu, who offers to take Kurt herself. However, suspecting Liu may have other plans, Wattona sends some thugs to deal with Liu and Kurt. Kurt is able to fend off the thugs with his martial arts skills. Liu takes Kurt to Master Durand and tells him to stay there until he is well enough to return to America. Kurt attempts to convince Durand to train him to face Tong Po. Durand, feeling he has already failed Eric, declines Kurt's offer. However, after a confrontation in the rain, Durand sees determination in Kurt and decides to train him. As Kurt begins his training, he and Liu slowly begin to start a romance. As Kurt feels ready, Durand gives him a test to a local bar where Joseph King sets up some small fights against his top fighter for money. When Durand has Kurt fight King's fighter, Kurt is decimated to the point where Durand must step in and stop the fighter before bringing Kurt back. Kavi shows up as a spy for Tong Po, but when Durand defeats Kavi, he makes Kavi a deal. Kavi has now joined Durand and helps Kurt train as well. When Kurt finally finds himself ready, he shows up at Tong Po's compound and has a rematch with Storm, which he wins. Using his newfound skills, Kurt challenges Tong Po to a fight, to which he accepts. Liu has learned through surveillance that Kurt has challenged Tong Po.

The next day, Liu has Kurt and Durand arrested; Liu intending to protect Kurt from Tong Po. Durand and Kurt are able to escape. Liu also informs Wattona that she is having him investigated for corruption. That night, Kurt and Tong have their long-awaited match. The first round has Tong Po getting most of the upper hand, but Kurt proves to be a worthy fighter, impressing the crowd. The second round includes broken glass on the hands, but once again Tong Po proves to be too powerful. Liu shows up to arrest Marcia, who vows she will be out the next morning. Liu arrives at the fight, but does not stop the fight this time.

The final round has Tong Po and Kurt fight with double swords to the death. Kurt is able to knock one of Tong Po's swords out of his hands and throws one of his swords, slashing Tong Po in the face. The sword is impaled on the wall. Kurt is able to now get the upper hand, especially when he has countered Tong Po's headlock, the same move that killed Eric. Kurt uses an array of Muay Thai and even adds a bit of grappling to stop Tong Po. However, when it looks like Kurt has won, Tong Po pushes Kurt onto the impaled sword and the two lock up with Kurt finally using his strength to impale Tong Po on the exposed blade of the sword, killing him when he tells Tong Po, "This is for Eric".

The next day, Kurt and Liu leave on a boat with Kavi and another female with Durand offering his goodbye in comic fashion.

== Cast ==
- Alain Moussi as Kurt Sloane
- Jean-Claude Van Damme as Master Durand
- Dave Bautista as Tong Po
- Darren Shahlavi as Eric Sloane
- Gina Carano as Marcia
- Georges St-Pierre as Kavi
- Sara Malakul Lane as Liu
- Matthew Ziff as Bronco
- T. J. Storm as Storm
- Steven Swadling as Joseph King
- Sam Medina as Crawford
- Luis Da Silva as Stahl
- Cain Velasquez as King's Fighter
- Fabricio Werdum as Fighter
- Michel Qissi as Prisoner (uncredited cameo)

== Production ==
Kings Road Entertainment announced in 2012 that they planned a 3-D remake of the film. Legal battles within the company, however, resulted in this version, along with several other planned remakes from the company, not being made.

Radar Pictures began developing a reboot of the film in 2013 with Jim McGrath and Dimitri Logothetis writing; Logothetis is also produced along with Ted Field and Nick Celozzi, Mike Weber and Peter Meyer executive producing and Stephen Fung attached to direct with the film start filming in early 2014. On May 12, 2014, Deadline announced that The Exchange boarded sales on Radar with Brian O’Shea, Jeff Bowler and Nat McCormick executive producing the film and announced stunt man Alain Moussi will star in his first lead role with co-starring roles by Georges St-Pierre, Dave Bautista, Scott Adkins, and Tony Jaa. J. J. Perry will be the action director and Larnell Stovall will be the fight choreographer. In November 2014, it was announced that Jaa and director Fung had left the project. John Stockwell stepped in as the film's director. In December 2014, actors T. J. Storm, Matthew Ziff and original film star Jean-Claude Van Damme were cast in the film. On December 4, Sara Malakul Lane joined the film to play the love interest of the lead character. On December 6, 2014, Darren Shahlavi was cast as Eric Sloan, a role was originally meant for Adkins. On December 8, Gina Carano joined the film's cast to play a fight promoter.

=== Filming ===
Filming began in New Orleans and Thailand on November 24, 2014.

Dave Bautista and Alain Moussi shot their final fight scene during the New Orleans shoot, due to Bautista having to leave early to shoot his scenes as Mr. Hinx in the James Bond film Spectre.

After completing the filming in New Orleans, Radar Pictures left without fully paying the crew and vendors. On February 10, 2015, producer Logothetis told Variety that all 180 crew members had been paid in early February, and he also revealed that there would a two-weeks shooting taken place in Thailand later that month.

After the New Orleans shoot, actor Darren Shahlavi, who played Eric Sloane, died at the age of 42 on January 14, 2015. Dimitri Logothesis said that the film will be dedicated to Darren's memory.

Production re-emerged in June 2015, with Alain Moussi going to Bangkok to film his scenes with Jean-Claude Van Damme. Dimitri Logothetis took over directing the shoot in Thailand.

=== Distribution ===
On March 15, 2016, RLJ Entertainment acquired the United States right to the film, with the intention of a limited theatrical release and a Video on Demand release.

== Release ==
The film premiered at the Fantasia International Film Festival on July 14, 2016. The film was released in select theaters and Video on Demand platforms by RLJ Entertainment on September 2, 2016.

== Reception ==
On review aggregator Rotten Tomatoes, the film holds an approval rating of 41% based on 34 reviews, with an average rating of 4.8/10. On Metacritic, the film has a weighted average score of 37 out of 100, based on reviews from eight critics, indicating "generally unfavorable" reviews.

== Sequels ==
In November 2015, Headmon and Acme Rocket Fuel announced the sequel titled Kickboxer: Retaliation, which was shot from June to August 2016. Rob Hickman would produce the film through Headmon along with Logothetis and Field through Radar Pictures. On August 31, 2016, producer Rob Hickman announced the name of the third and final installment of the trilogy as Kickboxer: Syndicate. The title was later changed to Kickboxer: Armageddon. Filming was expected to begin sometime in 2018; however, as of 2025, the film has not come to fruition.
