= Kickboxer: Retaliation =

2018 American martial arts film

- Theatrical release poster
- Directed by: Dimitri Logothetis
- Written by: Dimitri Logothetis; James McGrath
- Produced by: Dimitri Logothesis; Robert Hickman
- Starring: Alain Moussi; Jean-Claude Van Damme; Hafþór Júlíus Björnsson; Christopher Lambert; Ronaldinho; Mike Tyson; Rico Verhoeven
- Cinematography: Gerardo Madrazo
- Edited by: Christopher R. Bell; Daniel McDonald
- Music by: Adam Dorn
- Production companies: Our House Films; Acme Rocket Fuel
- Distributed by: Well Go USA Entertainment
- Release date: January 26, 2018
- Running time: 110 minutes
- Country: United States
- Language: English
- Box office: $101,690

Kickboxer: Retaliation is a 2018 American martial arts film directed and written by Dimitri Logothetis. It is the seventh in the Kickboxer film series and a direct sequel to the 2016 film Kickboxer: Vengeance, also written by Logothetis. The film stars Alain Moussi, Jean-Claude Van Damme, Christopher Lambert, Ronaldinho, Mike Tyson, Rico Verhoeven and Hafþór Júlíus Björnsson. Aside from Moussi and Van Damme, Sara Malakul Lane and Sam Medina reprised their roles from the previous film.

Set one year after the last outing in Kickboxer: Vengeance, the plot follows MMA champion Kurt Sloane (Moussi) who is sedated and taken to a prison in Bangkok. There he meets crime boss Thomas Moore (Lambert) who runs the underground fights in Thailand. Forced to fight the champion Mongkut (Björnsson) for his freedom, Sloane is once again trained by Master Durand (Van Damme) who was imprisoned by Moore and blinded. The film received generally positive reviews from critics.

== Plot ==
It has been eighteen months since Kurt Sloane killed Tong Po and avenged the death of his brother Eric. Now a professional mixed martial artist, Kurt defeats Renato Sobral using a move he calls the "Hurricane Armbar", a hurricanrana into an armbar. Kurt has been plagued by nightmares where he and his wife Liu are on a train and he finds himself fighting on the train which ends with him falling into water and possibly drowning. After the fight, Kurt is met by two U.S. Marshals who inform him that he must return to Thailand to be implicated in the death of Tong Po. When Kurt asks to see one of the Marshal's badges, he is tasered.

Awakening in a prison in Thailand, Kurt meets Thomas Tang Moore, the mastermind behind the underground tournament where Kurt, Eric, and Tong Po have competed. Moore tells Kurt that when Tong Po was defeated, he was to remain there as the new champion, but instead with Kurt returning home, Moore needed to find a new champion. Moore offers Kurt to fight the new champion, Mongkut, a 6'8" 400-lb. fighter. Kurt finds himself taunted by Crawford, Tong Po's former right-hand man who is working for Moore. Moore offers Kurt $1 million to fight Mongkut, but Kurt refuses. Stuck in prison, Kurt finds himself under constant threat from various prisoners, in which he then finds himself whipped by the prison guards each night. During one encounter, Kurt runs into Briggs, an American boxer who soon bonds with Kurt and even offers him a way to go through the pain from the whippings. Kurt also soon learns that his Muay Thai teacher, Durand, is now training some of the prisoners, but reveals that for his troubles, he has been blinded.

Moore, realizing Kurt still will not accept the offer, decides to take drastic measures and finds Liu at the train station. Having bribed the same police officers she had accused of corruption to find Kurt, she gets additional help from old friend Gamon. However, Moore's goons, led by Somsak, have kidnapped Liu and that night, Crawford shows Kurt a video of Liu. Kurt decides to take the fight with Durand, Briggs, and fellow prisoners Big Country, Fabricio, Ronaldo, and a huge convict whose size nearly matches that of Mongkut. When Moore offers to take Kurt out of prison and in a private facility, Kurt agrees but only if his "team" continues their training and Moore agrees. Durand goes to one of Mongkut's training sessions only to learn the fighter is a product of bioengineering by Ivy League graduate Rupert, who has developed a combination of adrenaline and steroids, thus making Mongkut virtually invincible except for one small weakness: a glass jaw. Gamon joins in on the training and Kurt recognizes Somsak. Moore talks to Crawford about a test fight, to which Moore agrees and Kurt goes to a local nightclub where he and Durand once again meet Joseph King, whose last fighter decimated Kurt. Kurt faces King's new champion Moss while Durand distracts an onlooker and steals his cell phone to call his son Travis. Kurt defeats Moss and make a narrow escape with the help of Travis.

The next day, Kurt finds Somsak and chases him. After fighting more of Moore's men, Kurt catches up to Somsak and demands to know where Liu is. Liu is being held in Moore's apartment. Kurt, Gamon, and Travis take on Moore's men with Kurt facing Moore's two female valets in a room full of mirrors only to defeat them, finding Liu and rescuing her. When O'Keefe, Moore's right-hand man, leads an ambush to stop the group, Mongkut arrives. He is about to hit Kurt when Liu steps in and Mongkut hits her hard in the stomach, knocking her unconscious. An angry Kurt tells Crawford to tell Moore he will face Mongkut anytime and anywhere. Liu is comatose in the hospital for a few days until she wakes up and learns Kurt has taken the fight. She fully accepts his decision.

The fight is set at the old Muay Thai temple with both Kurt and Mongkut ready to fight. Mongkut proves to be too much for Kurt and mid-way through, Mongkut throws Kurt to a statue, virtually killing him. When it is believed that Kurt has died from his injuries, Liu finds Rupert's suitcase of adrenaline and uses a needle to revive Kurt. Awakening, Kurt finds a second wind and despite getting some of the upper hand, Mongkut once again throws Kurt towards a statue and this time, takes him to a nearby fountain to drown him. Kurt imagines himself once again drowning as he did in his dream, but overhears the voices of Liu and Durand, prompting him to "swim out". Kurt grabs a chain and wraps it around his fist, enabling him to match Mongkut punch for punch. Using his skills, Kurt gets the upper hand and knocks Mongkut down. When Mongkut comes back up, Kurt resorts to taking Mongkut down with the chain, wrapping it around his neck and choking him out, resulting in Mongkut's neck breaking. Kurt has won and is surrounded by Durand, Liu, Gamon, and Travis. Hearing the news that Kurt has beaten Mongkut, Briggs is seen smiling in his prison cell.

An end credit sequence shows outtakes, following by an epilogue of Kurt once again in the MMA ring as he prepares for his next fight against Mauricio Rua.

== Cast ==
- Alain Moussi as Kurt Sloane
- Jean-Claude Van Damme as Master Durand
- Hafþór Júlíus Björnsson as Mongkut
- Mike Tyson as Briggs
- Sara Malakul Lane as Liu Sloane
- Christopher Lambert as Thomas Moore
- Steven Swadling as Joseph King
- Sam Medina as Crawford
- Miles Strommen as Rupert
- Randy Charach as Drake
- James P. Bennett as Nunchaku Man
- Brian Shaw as Huge Convict
- Roy Nelson as "Big Country"
- Ronaldinho as Ronaldo
- Fabricio Werdum as Fabricio
- Jessica Jann as Gamon
- Maxime Savaria as Somsak
- Nicholas Van Varenberg as Travis
- Wanderlei Silva as Chud
- Rico Verhoeven as Moss
- Renato Sobral as Himself
- Renzo Gracie as Himself
- Frankie Edgar as Himself
- Maurício Rua as Himself
- Jazz Securo as Fight Announcer
- Kevin Lee as Hafþór Júlíus Björnsson's Stunt Double

== Production ==
Headmon Entertainment and Acme Rocket Fuel announced the sequel to the film Kickboxer: Vengeance, titled Kickboxer 2: Retaliation. Rob Hickman produced the film through Our House Productions along with Dimitri Logothetis through Acme Rocket Fuel and executive produced by Steven Swadling and Larry Nealy. The film was retitled Kickboxer: Retaliation, began pre-production in February 2016, and Dimitri Logothetis was film's director and writer, while Hafþór Júlíus Björnsson was cast to play the role of a fighter. Ultimate Fighting Championship's Paige VanZant was cast in the film to make her feature debut, with other cast returning: Alain Moussi, Jean-Claude Van Damme, Sara Malakul Lane, Sam Medina, and Steven Swadling. Former world champion boxer Mike Tyson played a tough convict forced into a world of fighting behind bars.

UFC fighter Paige VanZant, who was set to make her film debut in the film as "Gamon", left the project to focus on an then-upcoming fight. Jessica Jann replaced her in the role. Originally a small role in the film, UFC fighter Roy "Big Country" Nelson's role was expanded. Christopher Lambert joined the cast as Thomas Moore, an ex-pat and martial artist who is the one responsible for coercing Kurt to face Mongkut.

Principal photography on the film began in mid-May 2016, in California and Nevada, and in Bangkok, Thailand in July.

== Release ==
Well Go USA Entertainment released the film in a limited theatrical release and on Demand platforms on January 26, 2018, and later on Blu-ray and DVD on March 14.

== Reception ==
On Rotten Tomatoes, the film has an approval rating of 93% based on 14 reviews, and an average rating of 6.6/10. On Metacritic, the film has a weighted average score of 54 out of 100, based on 5 critics, indicating "mixed or average" reviews.

Simon Abrams for RogerEbert.com called it a "very dumb, and very satisfying throwback to a simpler time when American action films were as predictable as they were formulaic". John DeFore of The Hollywood Reporter wrote: "A pulpy and fun fight flick that is better in some respects than it needs to be, Retaliation may not do for Moussi what the original Kickboxer did for Van Damme, but it won't send fans home disappointed".

In later roundups, FandomWire ranked Kickboxer: Retaliation 18th on its 2026 list of the 30 best martial arts movies of all time. MovieWeb included the film on a 2024 list of martial arts movies with Rotten Tomatoes scores above 90%. In 2026, MovieWeb ranked the film's prison fight seventh on its list of the best single-shot martial arts fights.

== Sequel ==
Producer Rob Hickman announced the name of the third and final installment of the trilogy as Kickboxer: Syndicate. It was later renamed Kickboxer: Armageddon and was set to begin production in 2018. Alain Moussi, James P. Bennett and Brazilian footballer Neymar will star, and Conor McGregor was rumored to also appear in the film. As of 2025, the film has not gone into production.
