= King of Killers =

2023 Canadian-American action film

- Directed by: Kevin Grevioux
- Written by: Kevin Grevioux
- Starring: Alain Moussi; Marie Avgeropoulos; Georges St-Pierre; Stephen Dorff; Frank Grillo
- Release date: September 1, 2023
- Running time: 92 minutes
- Countries: United States; Canada
- Language: English

King of Killers is a 2023 Canadian-American action film written and directed by Kevin Grevioux and starring Alain Moussi, Marie Avgeropoulos, Georges St-Pierre, Stephen Dorff and Frank Grillo. It is based on Grevioux’s graphic novel of the same title. It is also Grevioux’s feature directorial debut.

== Plot ==
King of Killers follows former Agency hitman Marcus Garan as he attempts to unravel the mystery behind a tragic incident. When offered a $10 million contract to eliminate the world’s greatest assassin, Marcus travels to Tokyo to meet the client, but discovers other professional killers have been invited as well. Now Marcus and the others must confront this deadly, mythical assassin…or die trying.

== Cast ==
- Alain Moussi as Marcus Garan
- Frank Grillo as Jorg Drakos
- Stephen Dorff as Robert Xane
- Marie Avgeropoulos as Asha Khanna
- Kevin Grevioux as Dyson Chord
- Shannon Kook as Ren Hiro
- Georges St-Pierre as Andre LeCroix

== Production ==
In February 2022, it was announced that Grillo was cast in the film. In September 2022, it was announced that the film was in post-production.

== Release ==
The film was released in theaters, on digital and demand on September 1, 2023. Then it was released on DVD and Blu-Ray on October 31, 2023.

== Reception ==
The film has a 19% rating on Rotten Tomatoes based on 16 reviews. Alan Ng of Film Threat rated the film a 7 out of 10. Julian Roman of MovieWeb rated the film a 2.5 out of 5.

Alex Maidy of JoBlo.com gave the film a negative review and wrote, "I did not expect Oscar-caliber acting but hoped for at least a few competent action scenes. Sadly, King of Killers disappoints in every way."

== Prequel television series ==
In September 2022, The Hollywood Reporter announced that there will be a television series set in the same universe but before the events in the film.
