= Jiu Jitsu (film) =

2020 film by Dimitri Logothetis

- Theatrical release poster
- Directed by: Dimitri Logothetis
- Screenplay by: Dimitri Logothetis; James McGrath
- Based on: Jiu Jitsu by: Dimitri Logothetis; James McGrath
- Produced by: Dimitri Logothetis; Martin Barab; Chris Economides
- Starring: Alain Moussi; Frank Grillo; JuJu Chan; Tony Jaa; Nicolas Cage
- Cinematography: Gerardo Madrazo
- Edited by: Danny McDonald
- Music by: Mocean Worker
- Production companies: Acme Rocket Fuel; Coprod Media International Limited; Double Tree Entertainment; Highland Film Group
- Distributed by: The Avenue Entertainment
- Release date: November 20, 2020
- Running time: 102 minutes
- Countries: United States; Cyprus
- Language: English
- Budget: $25 million
- Box office: $99,924

Jiu Jitsu is a 2020 American science fiction martial arts film directed by Dimitri Logothetis, who co-wrote the screenplay with James McGrath. It is based on the 2017 comic book of the same name by Logothetis and McGrath. It stars Alain Moussi, Frank Grillo, JuJu Chan, Tony Jaa and Nicolas Cage. It was a box office bomb, grossing less than $100,000 against a budget of $25 million, and was critically panned.

== Plot ==
Every six years in the last two millennia, an ancient order of superhuman martial artists called Jiu Jitsu faces a vicious race of alien invaders in a battle for Earth. The invaders have always lost to Earth's defenders, up until now.

In a jungle in Burma (Myanmar), American soldier Jake Barnes is running away from alien shuriken. Jake ends up falling off an oceanside cliff, where a mysterious western man rescues him and gives him over to the care of two Burmese fishermen. Assuming that he came from a nearby military post, and after foreboding miscommunication with an inexperienced translator, they take him there. Upon regaining consciousness, he is interrogated by an intelligence officer, Myra, as the military is puzzled by the villagers' mention of a comet that comes every six years and a hole in a temple opening. However, Jake appears to have amnesia, with no recall of events leading to his being found in the water, with even truth serums failing to disclose anything.

While Myra discusses this other operatives, Keung, an advanced Jiu Jitsu fighter, breaks his way through the base to rescue him, besting fist and gun alike. Keung recognizes Jake with a special handclasp and the two escape, in a long sequence that confirms Jake, too, is skilled in superhuman martial arts. They then reunite with a band of Jiu Jitsu fighters led by Harrigan. The fighters seem to know Jake, but he does not remember them or their mission. As they try to leave to head back to their base, the American military turns up again, and although the fighters easily defeat them, Myra manages to recapture Jake. He is interrogated again, but Jake only tells her to leave the zone with her unit, and Myra ultimately agrees. While traveling on foot through the jungle, they are attacked by the leader of the invaders, Brax, who wipes out the soldiers.

While running away, Jake falls into the cave of the mysterious man that rescued him, who turns out to be Wylie, a crazed Jiu Jitsu veteran. With the arrival of the rest of the band, they show Jake the Jiu Jitsu temple, which houses a portal the invaders use to cross into the Earth, and inform him Braz is coming for him. Jake also discovers Jiu Jitsu fighter Carmen used to be his lover before his amnesia. Brax then attacks the group, defeating the band and forcing Jake on his own again. After meeting and being encouraged by one of the American survivors, Cpt. Sand, Jake reunites again with Wylie, who reveals him the truth: Jake was a Jiu Jitsu fighter who fled from Brax during their first encounter, saving his life in exchange for unintentionally allowing the invader to wreak havoc. Wylie admits to be himself an escapee from the previous battle and accepts to help Jake.

The remaining Jiu Jitsu fighters face Brax again, being defeated and killed save for Carmen. Wylie duels Brax to atone for his past mistake, but although he gives a tough fight, he is killed too. After reuniting with him, Carmen reveals Jake that Wylie was his father, which he did not dare to tell him out of shame. Helped by the villagers and surviving soldiers, Jake decides to take on Brax with all of his might. After a long and prolonged battle, capitalizing on a vulnerability to fire he spotted on Brax on their previous fight, he is ultimately victorious, cutting Brax up, shoving a grenade on his innards before he heals up, and kicking him into the portal, finally ending the Jiu Jitsu challenge.

== Cast ==
- Alain Moussi as Jake Barnes
- Frank Grillo as Harrigan
- Nicolas Cage as Wylie
- JuJu Chan as Carmen
- Tony Jaa as Keung
- Marrese Crump as Forbes
- Ryan Tarran as Brax
- June Sasitorn as June
- Dan Rizutto as Franz
- Rigan Machado as Victor
- Rick Yune as Captain Sand
- Marie Avgeropoulos as Myra
- Jack Kingsley as Hector
- Eddie Steeples as Tex

== Production ==
It was announced in March 2019 that Cage and Alain Moussi were cast in the film.

Filming took place in June 2019 in Cyprus and included a glimpse of ancient Bagan temples in Burma.

== Release ==
Jiu Jitsu was released on November 20, 2020 by The Avenue Entertainment. In its debut weekend, the film was the eighth-most rented title on Apple TV and ninth on FandangoNow.

== Reception ==
On Rotten Tomatoes, the film has an approval rating of 28% based on 46 reviews, with an average rating of 3.8/10. The website's critical consensus reads: "Jiu Jitsu pits an ancient order of warriors against an alien invasion -- yet despite that appealingly bizarre premise and a cast that includes Nicolas Cage and Tony Jaa, it's the audience that loses." On Metacritic, the film has a weighted average score of 28 out of 100, based on reviews from 11 critics, indicating "generally unfavorable" reviews.

Simon Abrams of RogerEbert.com awarded the film one and a half stars. John DeFore of The Hollywood Reporter gave the film a negative review, noting that it "has all the barely-motivated action and sci-fi trappings of a middling videogame and, well, at least a little of the dramatic value." Tambay Obenson of IndieWire graded the film a D. Jeffrey M. Anderson of Common Sense Media gave the film two stars out of five. Slant Magazine's Steven Scaife awarded the film one and a half stars out of four. Chris Bumbray of JoBlo.com gave the film a 5 out of 10.

Fortress of Solitude praised the film describing it as: "An action-packed, 90s-style camp film that's all about entertainment". "Flyckering Myth" also had a positive reaction, Tom Joliffe writing that: "With a stellar cast, non-stop fights and stylish direction, this proves to be an enjoyable throwback that will please genre fans". Polygon called the film "extremely satisfying". Dan Jackson of Thrillist gave the film a positive review, writing "Luckily, Jiu Jitsu gets the most important aspects of a junky movie like this right."

Darren Murray from Martial Arts Actions Cinema rated the film 3 out of 5. Brent McKnight on Giant Freakin Robot also gave the film a positive rating.

Film School Rejects's Rob Hunter promoted the film positively, noting that, "[...] while it neglects to include any jiu-jitsu... it does give viewers plenty of action beats and a few fun thrills".

Kristy Puchko of IGN gave it 6 out of 10 and wrote "Jiu Jitsu feels like a deeply 2020 movie in that it is a barrage of WTF choices that hit without mercy until you either give in and go with the flow or just go mad. Or, hey, maybe both." She also questioned some of the film's visual design choices, such as using animated comic book panels and a saturated color scheme. J. Hurtado of Screen Anarchy reviewed the film negatively, calling it "an Adderall addled mess of a film that attempts to scratch a gonzo action itch that would be better served by hitting up a playlist of stunt demo reels on YouTube."

Jiu Jitsu had a cumulative worldwide gross of $99,924 against a budget of $25 million.

== Future and lawsuit ==
In 2021, Logothetis announced that he would not be returning to Cyprus to shoot the film's planned sequels or his next film Man of War. He and the film's producers announced their decision to pull out of Cyprus completely, stating their intention to take legal action against the Cypriot government due to the continued non-payment of almost €8 million which the film's investors are owed by the government per the terms of their contract. Jiu Jitsu was made under the cash rebate scheme launched by the Cyprus Investment Promotion Agency (CIPA). The producers said that a report by Cyprus' auditor general Odysseas Michaelides on the CIPA in general and Jiu Jitsu was completely false, ignorant of how such schemes operate, and potentially defamatory.

One of the film's producers, Chris Economides, called the government "incompetent" and guilty of a "tragic failure" that has resulted in filmmakers becoming "mired in petty local politics". He explained that this will cause producers to go elsewhere, since similar schemes operate all over Europe. He said, "What it means for Logothetis to leave includes the $120 million which he'd agreed to bring to Cyprus to make three other films. It includes Man of War which is [budgeted at] $37 million [and] it includes Jiu Jitsu 2 which might be another $24 million." He also mentioned his belief that the $600 million Czech investment fund behind Jiu Jitsu, which also backed five other films at the same time, would "surely not be coming back here after all that's happened".

Economides said that he did not see auditor general Michaelides as dishonest but merely uninformed, stating, "[Michaelides] only started taking an interest in the sector in 2019, because of the scheme. I've been in this business for 40 years." He especially noted the unfairness of Michaelides wrongly pointing out supposed irregularities without first asking for an explanation, as well as "exceeding his remit to become a film-critic-general" by examining the film's box office and critical reception despite the fact that these are irrelevant to the rebate scheme. The producers also put out a statement showing that the government actually stands to make roughly €960,000 from Jiu Jitsu when the rebate money (assuming the film makes money) gets stacked against the direct and indirect taxes it can collect from the film's contribution to the local economy.

Economides also said that Man of War was "all set to go" and that contracts had been signed with local crew who have now lost their jobs, and locations had already been found in the Nicosia area that would double as California. The continued non-payment, coupled with the auditor general's report, led to the local bank that was lending money based on the rebate to cancel the deal and state that the scheme did not seem reliable. Logothetis said, "I can no longer make the movie [in Cyprus]. I'm not going to make Man of War here. I'm going to take it somewhere else. [...] If you don't pay on time and you don't treat a producer properly, they're going to leave. And so, you win. Everybody wants to win an argument—fine, you won the argument. We're gonna take our movie, take our money, and we're gonna go somewhere else. Thank you."
