= Gunner (film) =

2024 film by Dimitri Logothetis

- Release poster
- Directed by: Dimitri Logothetis
- Screenplay by: Gary Scott Thompson
- Produced by: Joel Shapiro; Dimitri Logothetis
- Starring: Luke Hemsworth; Mykel Shannon Jenkins; Yulia Klass; Grant Feely; Connor DeWolfe; Morgan Freeman
- Cinematography: Gerardo Madrazo
- Edited by: Christopher Bell
- Music by: Mocean Worker
- Production companies: Magic City Studios; Convergence Entertainment Group; 120dB Films; Acme Rocket Fuel
- Distributed by: Highland Film Group
- Release date: August 16, 2024
- Running time: 106 minutes
- Country: United States
- Language: English

Gunner is a 2024 American action film written by Gary Scott Thompson and directed by Dimitri Logothetis. It stars Luke Hemsworth, Mykel Shannon Jenkins, Yulia Klass, Grant Feely, Connor DeWolfe, and Morgan Freeman. It was released on August 16, 2024.

== Plot ==
Medal of Honor recipient, Lt. Colonel Lee Gunner, returns to his home town after a long career in the U.S. Army Special Forces. Lee hopes to reconnect with his sons Travis and Luke, and gets permission from his ex-wife Claire to take them camping. Travis is resentful towards his father for disappearing during his last tour and for the death of his older brother, who died shortly after returning from Afghanistan. Lee’s brother in law Jon, meets them at base camp as they take ATVs deep into the woods.

While hiking, the group discovers a hidden Triad drug lab and are discovered after Jon trips an IED, mortally wounding him. Lee fights off the Triads to buy time for his sons to escape. Travis and Luke are kidnapped by the Triads business partners, a ruthless biker gang led by Dobbs Ryker. Lee tries to rescue them but is interrupted by a DEA raid and is arrested.

Lee breaks out of jail with help from the Sheriff and tracks Dobbs to an abandoned lumber mill where he fights his way to his sons. Lee is able to free Travis but Dobbs escapes with Luke as the DEA arrives. Lee and Travis meet Sean, an Army Ranger who Lee served with in Afghanistan. Sean tells Travis that Lee saved him from an ambush on his last tour but was captured by the Taliban and tortured for a year until he could escape.

Lee decides to break Dobbs’s father Kendrick out of prison to trade him for Luke. Lee parachutes into the prison disguised as a guard and starts a riot as cover to escape with Kendrick. Lee duct tapes a shotgun to Kendrick and arrives at Dobbs’s drug warehouse. As Dobbs agrees to swap his father for Luke, Kendrick stabs Lee and runs away but trips causing the shotgun to fire and kills him.

Dobbs takes Luke and escapes on a helicopter as Lee fights bikers to reach them. Lee manages to reach the helicopter but the pilot is killed as Lee and Dobbs fight. As the helicopter falls, Lee kills Dobbs by kicking him out of the helicopter and parachutes to safety with Luke. With his family safe and cleared by the DEA, Lee visits the grave of his eldest son.

== Cast ==
- Luke Hemsworth as Lee Gunner
- Morgan Freeman as Kendrick Ryker
- Mykel Shannon Jenkins as Dobbs
- Joseph Baena as Wally
- Grant Feely as Luke Gunner
- Connor DeWolfe as Travis Gunner
- Maurice P. Kerry as Sean Keller
- Yulia Klass as Claire

== Production ==
In January 2023, it was announced that Luke Hemsworth would star in the film. The following month, Morgan Freeman joined the cast. In April 2023, Joseph Baena, Grant Feely, Connor DeWolfe and Mykel Shannon Jenkins were added to the cast.

Filming began in Birmingham, Alabama on March 30, 2023. Filming also occurred in Bessemer, Alabama in April 2023.

== Release ==
Gunner was released in select theaters and on digital on August 16, 2024.

== Reception ==
Jeffrey M. Anderson of Common Sense Media awarded the film two stars out of five.

Matthew Donato of Collider rated the film a 3 out of 10.
