= Enhanced =

- Poster
- Directed by: James Mark
- Written by: James Mark; Plato Fountidakis; Bruno Marino
- Produced by: James Mark
- Starring: George Tchortov; Alanna Bale
- Cinematography: Russ de Jong
- Music by: Jim McGrath
- Production companies: IndiePro Studios; JP Action Film
- Release date: October 24, 2019 (Toronto After Dark)
- Running time: 99 minutes
- Countries: Canada; Japan
- Language: English

Enhanced is a 2019 Canadian-Japanese action film produced, written and directed by James Mark. The film premiered at the 2019 Toronto After Dark Film Festival.

== Plot ==
A sinister government organization hunts down mutants, and one of such is a young woman with enhanced abilities. But when she encounters an even stronger serial killer who emerges on the scene, agents and mutants are forced to question their allegiances. This is not an advertised sequel, but it is the continuation of the story from the 2017 movie "Kill Order".

== Cast ==
- George Tchortov as George Shepherd
- Alanna Bale as Anna
- Adrian Holmes as Captain Williams
- Chris Mark as David
- Eric Hicks as Scott
- Michael Joseph Delaney as Eli
- Patrick Sabongui as Joseph
- Elvis Stojko as Officer Reves
- Stefano DiMatteo as Marco
- Jeffrey R. Smith as Danny
- Dorren Lee as Fanny
- Eric Daniel as Mehran
- Carl Bauer as Ritchie
- Kevan Kase as Joey
- Dylan Mask as Jim
- Alain Moussi as Abel
- Tyler James Williams as Ron
- Mustafa Bulut as Subject 1
- Jonny Caines as Subject 2

== Reception ==
On review aggregator website Rotten Tomatoes the film has a score of 25% based on reviews from eight critics, with an average rating of 2.8/10.

Nathaniel Muir of AIPT Comics liked the film's fight scenes, while Kat Hughes of The Hollywood News called the film "[t]he big downfall" and "just a bit dull, bland, and vanilla".

Cynthia Vinney of the Comic Book Resources, compared villain in Enhanced to Heroes while the plot is reminiscent of Universal Soldier, Dark Angel and The One all mixed into one film. She also mentioned that when it comes to visuals, the film is a combo of The Terminator and X-Men.

According to Joshua Rivera of Polygon "Enhanced does very little with an absolutely bonkers twist".
