= Sara Malakul Lane =

Thai-American actress and former model

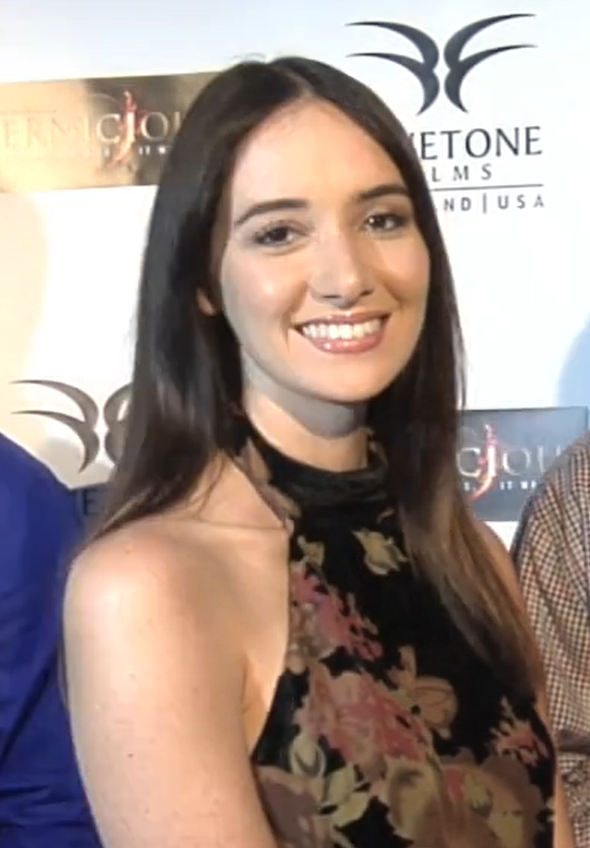
- Malakul Lane in 2015
- Born: Sara Ann Lane; Guam
- Other names: Sara Malakul Grove
- Education: NIST International School
- Occupations: Actress; model
- Spouse: Patrick Grove
- Children: 4

Sara Ann Lane, married surname Grove, a.k.a. Sara Malakul Lane (Thai: ซาร่า มาลากุล เลน) is a Thai-American actress and former model. She has appeared in numerous Thai and Hollywood films. She most notably featured as the female lead in two films in the Kickboxer action film franchise.

== Early life ==
Sara Malakul Lane was born in Guam to a Scottish father, Alastair Lane, and a Thai mother, Thapthim Malakul na Ayudhaya. Her mother's father, Mom Luang Pikthip Malakul, was a diplomat, including ambassador of Thailand to Myanmar and the United Kingdom; Pikthip Malakul's grandfather was one of many children of Rama II of Siam, making her King Rama's great-great-great-granddaughter. She grew up between the United Kingdom and Bangkok, where she studied at NIST International School. She lived in Los Angeles and she currently resides in Singapore.

== Career ==
Lane, a method actress, started her acting career at the age of 15, transitioning from modeling after she won a role in her first TV series. She acted in Thai soap operas before moving to America.

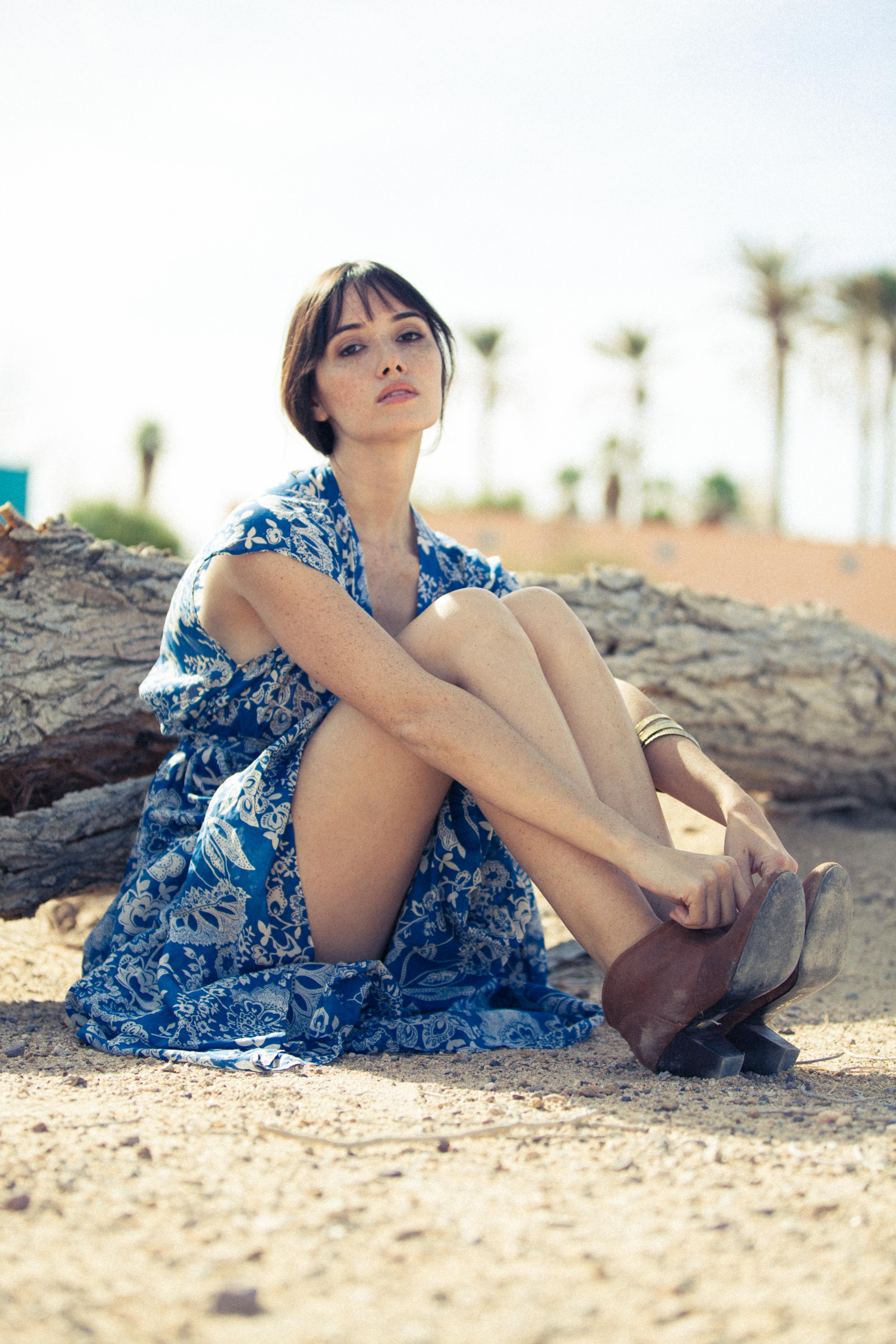
Sara Malakul Lane modelling in 2012

Her first role in a Hollywood film was playing Steven Seagal's daughter in the 2003 film Belly of the Beast. She then starred in Sharktopus with Eric Roberts in 2010 and alongside Roberts and Peter Stormare in The Wayshower in 2011.

In 2014, she starred in Jailbait, a thriller drama film.

In 2016, she played a Bangkok detective who becomes the love interest of the lead character in Kickboxer: Vengeance, which was released in September 2016. She reprised the role in the sequel, Kickboxer: Retaliation, released in 2018.

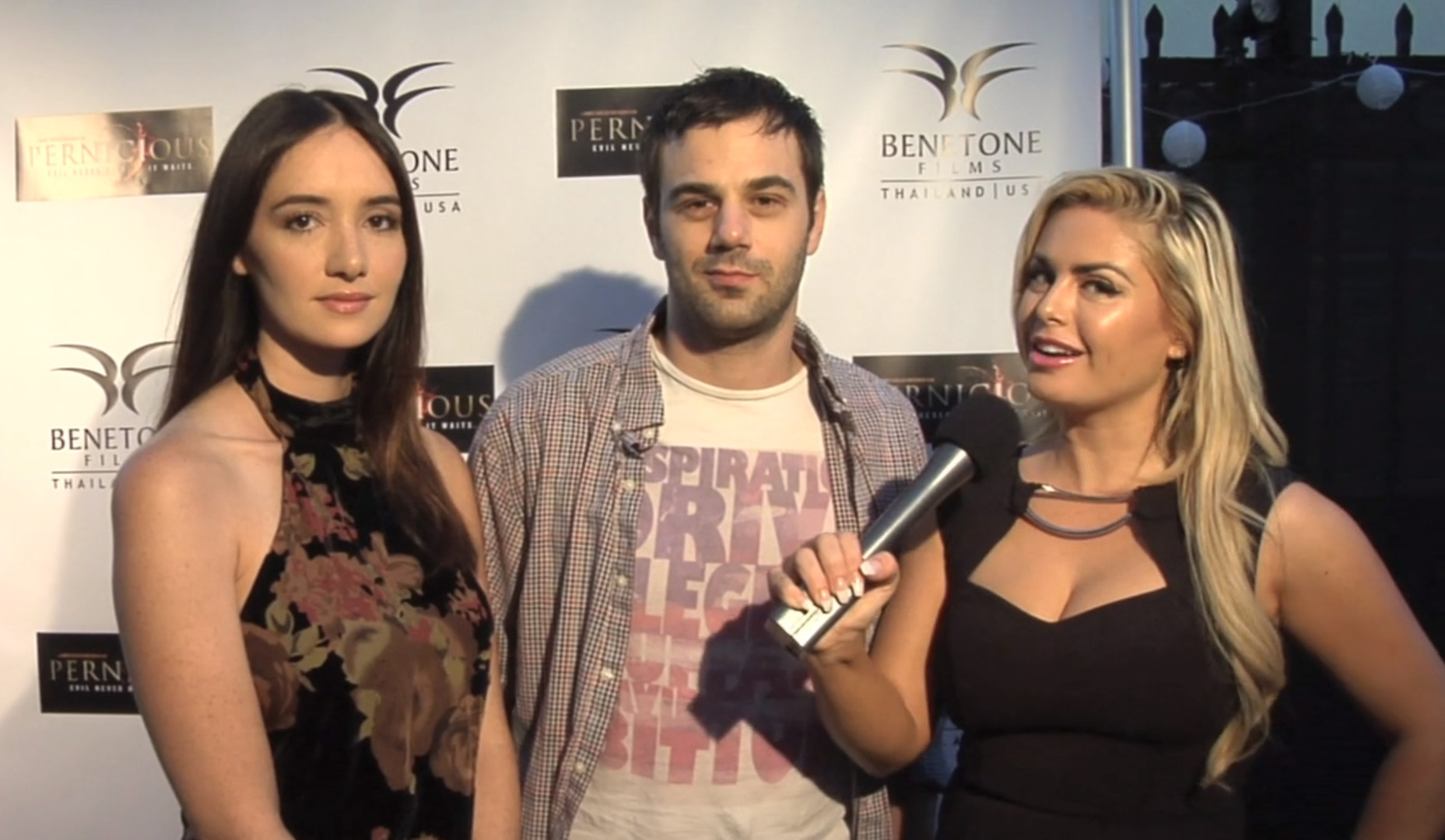
Sara with Jared Cohn

== Filmography ==
=== Film ===
Year	Title	Role	Notes
2003	Belly of the Beast	Jessica Hopper	
2005	The Volcano Disaster	Angela	
2005	Dumber Heroes	Gaywarin	พยัคฆ์ร้ายส่ายหน้า (Phayak Rai Sai Na)
2005	Match Point	Net	เพราะรักครับผม (Phro Rak Khrapphom)
2008	Tied in Knots	Kate	
2010	Sharktopus	Nicole Sands	
2011	The Wayshower	Maylene	
2011	Baby, We'll Be Fine	Her	Short film
2012	12/12/12	Veronica	
2013	100 Degrees Below Zero	Taryn Foster	
2014	Jailbait	Anna Nix	
2014	Pretty Perfect	Jessica	
2014	Pernicious	Samorn	
2015	Jurassic City	Mandy	
2015	Sun Choke	Savannah	
2015	Cowboys vs Dinosaurs	Dr. Sinclair	
2015	Shark Lake	Meredith Hernandez	
2015	Scouts Guide to the Zombie Apocalypse	Beth Daniels	
2015	Buddy Hutchins	Evelyn	
2016	Wishing for a Dream	Mika Andrews	
2016	Beyond the Gates	Dahlia	
2016	Shortwave	Jane	
2016	Kickboxer: Vengeance	Liu	
2017	Who's Watching Oliver	Sophia	
2017	King Arthur and the Knights of the Round Table	Morgana	
2017	Death Pool	Scarlet	
2017	The Domicile	Lucy	
2017	Halloween Pussy Trap Kill! Kill!	Amber Stardust	
2018	Kickboxer: Retaliation	Liu	
2018	Shangri-La: Near Extinction	Pax / Dr. Savatanand	
2018	Disposition	Sarah Hitchens	Short film
2018	All About the Afterglow	Jade	
2019	Captured	Sunny	

=== Television ===
Year	Title	Role	Notes
2000	Hua Jai Song Park	Sunny (Tawanshine)	TV mini-series
