= Cinderelas, lobos e um príncipe encantado =

2009 Brazilian documentary film directed by Joel Zito Araújo

- Directed by: Joel Zito Araújo
- Screenplay by: Joel Zito Araújo / José Carvalho
- Produced by: Casa de Criação
- Cinematography: Alberto Bellezia
- Edited by: Márcia Watzl
- Release date: 2009
- Running time: 108 minutes
- Country: Brazil

Cinderelas, lobos e um príncipe encantado (English: Cinderellas, Wolves and a Prince Charming) is a 2008 Brazilian documentary film directed by Joel Zito Araújo.

== Synopsis ==
Around 900,000 people are trafficked through international borders every year with a single purpose: sexual exploitation. However, even with all the struggles and dangers, young Brazilian women still believe in the possibility of changing their lives and finding their enchanted prince as they are submerged into the work of sexual tourism. Only a tiny minority ever manages to find a soul mate and get married. The film journeys from the northeast of Brazil to Berlin seeking to understand the sexual, racial, and power imaginary of the young Cinderellas from the south and the wolves from the north.
