= Marie Avgeropoulos =

Canadian actress

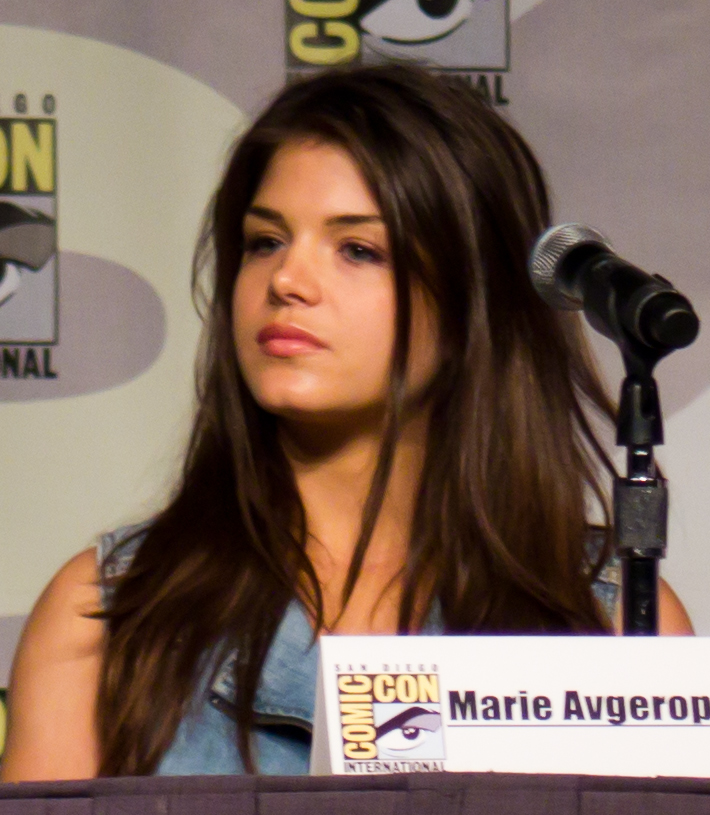
- Avgeropoulos at the 2013 San Diego Comic-Con
- Born: 17 June 1986 (age 40); Thunder Bay, Ontario, Canada
- Education: Port Arthur Collegiate Institute
- Occupations: Actress; model
- Years active: 2009–present
- Known for: The 100

Marie Avgeropoulos (Greek: Μαρία "Μαρί" Αυγεροπούλου; born 17 June 1986) is a Canadian actress and model. She is best known for her role as Octavia Blake on The CW's post-apocalyptic science fiction television series The 100 (2014–2020).

== Early life ==
Avgeropoulos was born on 17 June 1986 in Thunder Bay, Ontario. Her father is Greek, born in Krokilio, near Nafpaktos. She grew up fishing, hunting and camping, spending most of her free time outdoors. She started playing drums when she was 16. After studying broadcast journalism for two years in her hometown, she moved to Europe. Several months later, she came back to Canada and settled in Vancouver. At the age of 20, she underwent surgery in order to remove a large tumour from her chest and throat, with her vocal cords being removed and put back in. This procedure affected her voice.

== Career ==
One of her friends invited her for a casting call in Vancouver, which happened to be looking for drummers. A talent agent recognized her talent and invited her to appear in various national commercials. She caught the attention of director Chris Columbus. He hired Avgeropoulos for I Love You, Beth Cooper, which became her first feature film role. Her appearance in the film gave her the opportunities to star in more films, television shows and magazines.

In 2010, Avgeropoulos was cast as Kim Rhodes in the film Hunt to Kill, which became her break-out role.

Early in 2013, Avgeropoulos made her break-out in television after being cast for a recurring role in The CW's Cult. However, the series failed to attract viewers and after episode 7, the show was cancelled. The remaining six episodes of the show were broadcast later in the summer.

Not long after the show ended, The CW cast her as one of the main characters in their new sci-fi, The 100, to portray the character Octavia Blake.

== Personal life ==
In late 2018, Avgeropoulos was involved in a domestic violence incident when she and her boyfriend allegedly began arguing in a car on the Ventura Freeway shortly after midnight on 5 August 2018. Avgeropoulos was on new medication mixed with alcohol, and was accused of striking him multiple times in the head, neck and arm, resulting in minor injuries according to the District Attorney's Office. She was then charged with domestic violence. Avgeropoulos' boyfriend wanted the charges dropped and stated that she does not pose a threat. The case was formally dismissed with all charges dropped, as there was no intent of harm on Avgeropoulos' part, but rather "an adverse reaction to medication that triggered the outburst."

She was previously in a relationship with American actor Taylor Lautner from 2013 until 2015.

== Filmography ==
=== Film ===
Year	Title	Role	Notes
2009	I Love You, Beth Cooper	Valli Wooley	
2010	Percy Jackson & the Olympians: The Lightning Thief	Aphrodite Girl	
2010	Hunt to Kill	Kim Rhodes	
2011	50/50	Allison	
2015	Tracers	Nikki	
2015	Numb	Cheryl	Nominated - Leo Awards for Best Supporting Performance by a Female in a Motion Picture
2015	Isolation	Nina	
2016	A Remarkable Life	Chelsea	
2016	Dead Rising: Endgame	Sandra Lowe	
2019	Wonder Woman: Bloodlines	Vanessa Kapatelis / Silver Swan	Voice role
2020	Jiu Jitsu	Myra	
2023	King of Killers	Asha Khanna	
2024	The Painter	Piasecki	
2024	Queen of the Ring	Elvira Snodgrass	

=== Television ===
Year	Title	Role	Notes
2009	Supernatural	Taylor	Episode: "After School Special"
2009	Harper's Island	Stacy	Episode: "Bang"
2009	The Guard	Jeanette	Episode: "Body Parts"
2009	Sorority Wars	Missy	TV movie
2010	The Troop	Sarah	Episode: "Speed"
2010	Fringe	Leah / Waitress	2 episodes
2010	Smoke Screen	Suzi	TV movie
2010	Human Target	Jamie Hartloff	Episode: "The Other Side of the Mall"
2011	Eureka	Bonnie	Episode: "Reprise"
2011	Hiccups	Terry	Episode: "Sexual Healing"
2012	Fugitive at 17	Holly Hamilton	TV movie
2012	Walking the Halls	Amber	TV movie
2012	The Inbetweeners	Samantha	4 episodes
2013	90210	Cassie McCoy	Episode: "The Empire State Strikes Back"
2013	Cult	Kirstie Nelson	Recurring role
2014–2020	The 100	Octavia Blake	Main cast
