= Proper Preparation and Planning (The Boys episode) =

- The Boys episode
- Episode no.: Season 2 Episode 2
- Directed by: Liz Friedlander
- Written by: Rebecca Sonnenshine
- Cinematography by: Dylan Macleod
- Editing by: Cedric Nairn-Smith
- Original release date: September 4, 2020
- Running time: 59 minutes

Guest appearances
- Shantel VanSanten as Becca Butcher; Langston Kerman as Eagle the Archer; Jessica Hecht as Carol Manheim; Abraham Lim as Kenji Miyashiro; Nicola Correia-Damude as Elena; Cameron Crovetti as Ryan Butcher; David Thompson as Gecko; Adrian Holmes as Dr. Park; Laila Robins as Grace Mallory; Patton Oswalt as Gills (uncredited)

Episode chronology
← Previous "The Big Ride"	Next → "Over the Hill with the Swords of a Thousand Men"
- The Boys season 2

"Proper Preparation and Planning" is the second episode of the second season and tenth episode overall of the American superhero television series The Boys, based on the comic book series of the same name by Garth Ennis. It is set in a universe where superpowered individuals, known as Supes, are portrayed as corrupt individuals instead of the heroes the general public believes they are. The episode was written by Rebecca Sonnenshine and directed by Liz Friedlander.

The episode follows Billy Butcher reuniting with the Boys to capture a Supe terrorist that has recently arrived in the city, having made a deal with his former mentor Grace Mallory in exchange for reuniting with his wife Becca shortly after discovering that she was still alive, initially unaware that the terrorist they are dealing with is Kimiko's younger brother Kenji. Meanwhile, Homelander attempts to meet and connect with his son, whose name is revealed to be Ryan, with the former having fathered the latter with Becca eight years ago and whose existence he was unaware of.

"Proper Preparation and Planning" was released on the streaming service Amazon Prime Video on September 4, 2020. The episode received positive reviews from critics with praise for the performances and focused on the main characters' relationships but received some criticism for its pacing and not adding anything new to the storyline.

== Plot ==
In a flashback, shortly after the revelation that his wife Becca is still alive, Billy Butcher wakes up in a parking lot of a restaurant; he attempts to write down everything he remembers about Becca's house, but after seeing on a TV news broadcast that he is being framed for Madelyn Stillwell's murder, (Note: As depicted in "You Found Me".) he flees.

In the present, after reuniting with the Boys, Butcher approaches his former mentor, Grace Mallory, at Susan Raynor's funeral. Mallory agrees to help Butcher find Becca in exchange for delivering the Supe terrorist to her. Kimiko attempts to tell Frenchie about the Supe terrorist by repeatedly pointing to the word "boy", but Frenchie does not understand.

Homelander visits his son Ryan and attempts to get to know him. Becca argues with Homelander, who wants Ryan to learn to use his powers, while she wants to raise him as a normal kid. After Homelander refuses to leave her and Ryan alone, Becca calls Dr. Park and confronts him over Vought's failure to fulfill their promise to keep Homelander away from them. Dr. Park explains that Homelander did not react well after learning of Ryan's existence and that Vought did not want to further antagonize him. Becca confronts Homelander by demanding him to leave but he refuses.

Meanwhile, the Deep is drugged and locked in a room by Carol and Eagle the Archer, who hope to put him on a "journey" of self-confidence and convince him to join the Church of the Collective. The Deep has a hallucination of his gills speaking to him and has a "heart-to-heart" conversation with them where he confesses his insecurities, revealing that he abuses women as a defense mechanism. Eventually, the Deep manages to make amends with himself and regains his confidence before his gills comfort him, and they start singing together.

Stormfront joins the Seven as the new member. Vought intends to use her alongside Queen Maeve and Annie January as Starlight to promote feminism in the Seven but Maeve leaves to visit her ex-girlfriend Elena in the hospital after Elena suffered an accident. At the press junket announcing Stormfront as the Seven's latest member, Annie is asked about A-Train, who surprises Annie by showing up at the event, having woken up from his coma. Gecko succeeds in retrieving a vial of Compound-V and delivers it to Annie. A suspicious A-Train threatens to expose her, but Annie remembers that A-Train confessed to having killed Popclaw to Hughie, (Note: As depicted in "Good for the Soul".) and threatens to reveal this publicly, forcing A-Train to leave.

The Boys find the Supe terrorist in a costume shop accompanied by soldiers of the Shining Light Liberation Army, a terrorist group that kidnapped Kimiko when she was a child. After Kimiko kills the soldiers, she recognizes the Supe terrorist as her brother Kenji and embraces him as they reunite for the first time in years. Frenchie realizes what she was trying to tell him earlier. However, Butcher still tries to shoot Kenji. Hughie intervenes, causing Kenji to run away with Kimiko. Butcher is forced to tell the team the truth about Becca being still alive and the deal with Mallory.

During their reunion, Kimiko and Kenji have a heartfelt conversation, remembering their childhood, but this soon intensifies into an argument, and Kimiko realizes that Kenji has been brainwashed by the Shining Light Liberation Army, and they fight. Kimiko overpowers Kenji and reluctantly aids the Boys in capturing him. Butcher punches Hughie and threatens to kill him if he comes between him and Becca again.

== Production ==
=== Development ===
In July 2019, it was announced that the second season of The Boys was already in development during San Diego Comic-Con a week before the series premiered. The series showrunner and head writer Eric Kripke had already begun writing the scripts for the season, having started to work on them during the 2018 United States elections in order to capture the topics and themes that would be explored in the season accurately, including white nationalism, white supremacy, systemic racism, and xenophobia. In June 2020, it was announced that the episodes for the second season would be released in a weekly basis instead of releasing all of them in one day to make people discuss about the topics for a longer time. The episode titled "Proper Preparation and Planning" was written by Rebecca Sonnenshine and directed by Liz Friedlander. The episode is titled with the name of the issues #48–51 of the comic book series of the same name.

=== Writing ===
The episode introduces a new Supe group known as the Church of the Collective which would be recurring in the Deep's storyline in the second season. The Church of the Collective is portrayed as an institution that seeks to gain power and influence by brainwashing ruined celebrities by offering them to restore their image in exchange for their support, with the celebrities following them blindly as they do not understand the real motives of the group. The group is used to parody the real group, the Church of Scientology, as a way to develop the Deep as a more complex character while also mocking actor Tom Cruise's allegiance with the group and his relationship and attitude with Katie Holmes, while also using this as a way to introduce its own version of Scientology for the universe. The storyline also introduces a running gag related to the Church of the Collective's favored drink Fresca, that would be used frequently for the rest of the second season, to which Kripke and the writers admitted that it was a joke with no meaning that they kept purely for its humor.

=== Casting ===
The episode main cast includes Karl Urban as Billy Butcher, Jack Quaid as Hughie Campbell, Antony Starr as John Gillman / Homelander, Erin Moriarty as Annie January / Starlight, Dominique McElligott as Maggie Shaw / Queen Maeve, Jessie T. Usher as Reggie Franklin / A-Train, Laz Alonso as Marvin T. Milk / Mother's Milk (M.M.), Chace Crawford as Kevin Kohler / The Deep, Tomer Capone as Serge / Frenchie, Karen Fukuhara as Kimiko Miyashiro / The Female, Nathan Mitchell as Earving / Black Noir, Colby Minifie as Ashley Barrett, and Aya Cash as Klara Risinger / Stormfront. Also starring are Shantel VanSanten as Becca Butcher, Langston Kerman as Eagle the Archer, Jessica Hecht as Carol Manheim, Abraham Lim as Kenji Miyashiro, Nicola Correia-Damude as Elena, Cameron Crovetti as Ryan Butcher, David W. Thompson as Gecko, Adrian Holmes as Dr. Park, and Laila Robins as Grace Mallory. Patton Oswalt makes an uncredited appearance as The Deep's gills.

=== Filming ===
The filming for the second season took place in the city of Toronto, while using several locations across the city in order to seek to capture the New York City where the series took place. Filming was shot at the Willowdale Presbyterian Church for the scene that depicts Susan Raynor's funeral. The scene where Kimiko fights her brother was filmed at an esplanade located south of St. Lawrence Market.

=== Visual effects ===
Visual effects for the episode were created by ILM, Rising Sun Pictures, Rocket Science VFX, Rodeo FX, Ollin VFX, Soho VFX, Rhythm & Hues, Method Studios, and Studio 8. It was confirmed that the visual effects supervisor, Stephan Fleet, would be returning to oversee the development of the visual effects. The creation of the Deep's gills replicated the similar process that was used for the previous season, where prosthetics were used to capture the gills with practical effects, though it would be enhanced and recreated with visual effects to not only capture the realistic look but also for the creation of the talking gills. Most of the cast of the series admitted feeling disgusted and terrified by the realism of the scene and the process that it took for its creation.

=== Music ===
The episode featured songs: "Indé-structible" by Guizmo, "Iris" by Goo Goo Dolls, "Day One" by Hatin Toney, "You're Only Human (Second Wind)" by Billy Joel, and "Psycho Killer" by Talking Heads.

== Release ==
"Proper Preparation and Planning" premiered on Prime Video in the United States on September 4, 2020. It was released as one of the first three episodes of the season, with the other two being released on the same date. The episode, along with the rest of The Boys' second season, was released on Blu-ray on May 31, 2022.

== Reception ==
"Proper Preparation and Planning" received positive reviews from critics. For the recap that Nick Schager wrote for Entertainment Weekly, he considered that the storyline gave the mission for the titular team a sense of hope for reuniting with their loved ones but considered that for the series it has been proven that nuclear families often prove downright combustible. The review of Roxana Hadadi from The A.V. Club praised the episode for Starr's performance as Homelander for which he described the character as someone who believes to be "superior enough to take out a safe house of terrorists all by himself, and maniacal enough to think he's a god", while also praising the character's use of toxic masculinity, bullying, and passive aggression, which defines the character as the leader of the Seven. David Griffin from IGN rated the first three episodes with 9 out of 10 and gave particular praise to Fukuhara's performance as Kimiko and deemed that her "motive expressions and body language effectively communicate the nuanced emotions she's feeling throughout." He also gave praise to her character's relationship with Frenchie and called this to be one of the most "tender-hearted relationships in this otherwise-cynical take on superheroes".

Brian Tallerico from Vulture rated the episode with 4 stars out of 5, giving praise for the focus on the relationships between the main characters and the portrayal of toxic masculinity in the series. However, he also criticized the episode for having too much exposition and storytelling, which he deemed could be exhausting, and this could be found in multiple episodes of a Netflix series. The recap from Richard Edwards at TechRadar which received 4 out of 5 stars, stated that the Seven best moments, particularly the Deep's speaking with the gills, are found in this episode and considered the latter's storyline to be actually kind of funny and heart-breaking, showing how the series has managed to accomplish its success. He also praised the character of Homelander by stating he is on his way to becoming one of the greatest villains on television. Liz Shannon Miller, who wrote a review for Collider lauded the performance of Urban as Butcher while also praising the episode's first scene, which managed to solve the question about the character's fate at the end of the previous season.
