= Dimitri Logothetis =

American film director

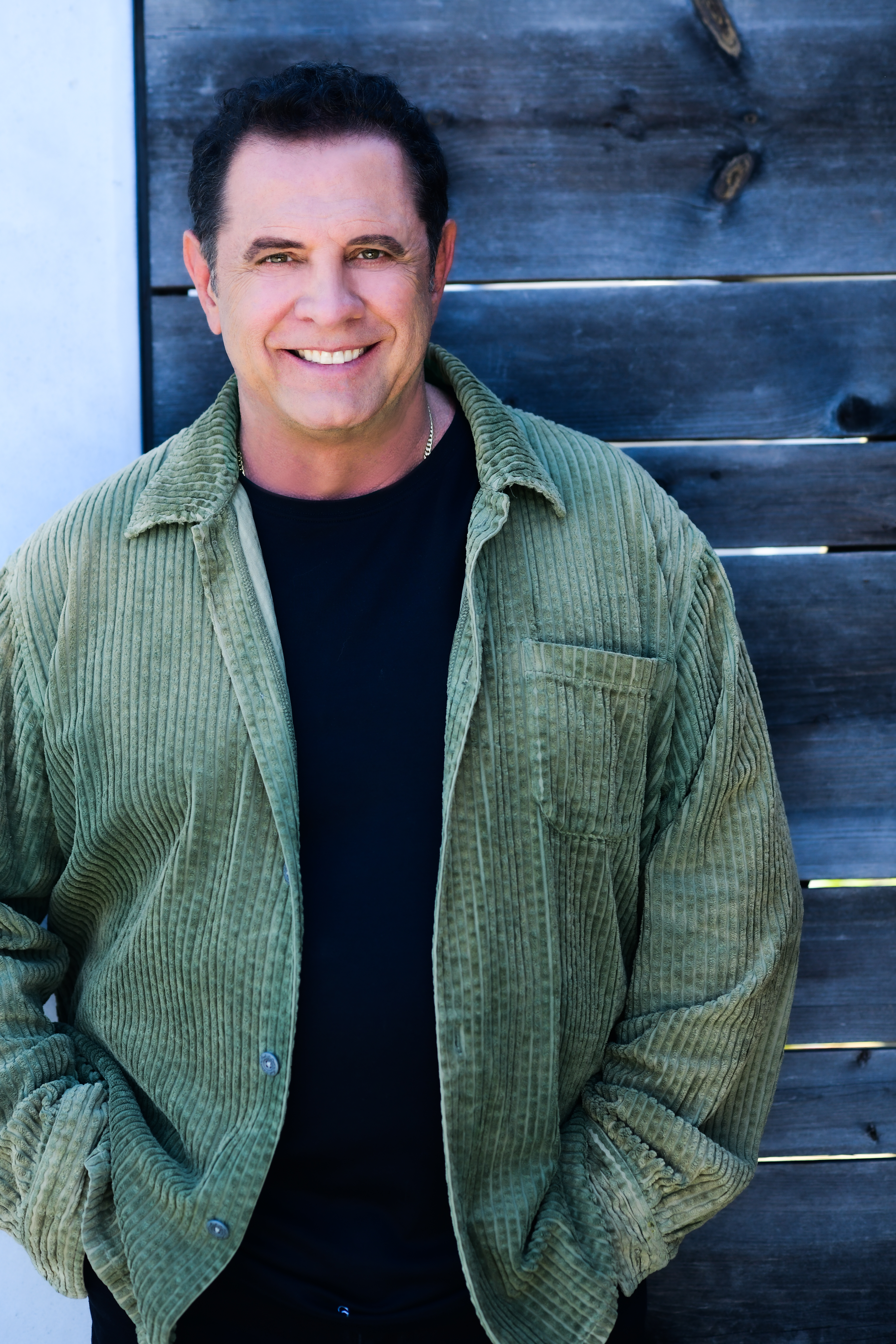
- Logothetis in August 2023
- Born: Athens, Greece
- Occupations: Filmmaker; actor
- Website: www.dimitrilogothetis.com

Dimitri Logothetis is an American filmmaker of Greek descent. He is known for his reboots of the Kickboxer franchise, and Gunner, a 2024 action thriller starring Morgan Freeman and Luke Hemsworth.

== Early life and education ==
Dimitri Logothetis was born in Athens, Greece, to Anna and Euthymios Logothetis.

== Career ==
In his last year of university, Logothetis was hired by Capitol Records to record the American tour of rock band The Knack. He was then hired by Columbia Pictures to produce his first film, Hardbodies 2. In 1987, he directed his first feature film Pretty Smart., and developed the horror film Slaughterhouse Rock. In 1989, he directed the boxing documentary Champions Forever, featuring Muhammad Ali, Larry Holmes, George Foreman, Ken Norton and Joe Frazier. Danny Aiello then came to Logothetis with a stage play, Wheel Barrel Closers, which Logothetis adapted for the screen and directed under the title The Closer, starring Aiello, Diane Baker and Michael Paré. He was an executive producer on the Stephen King film Sleepwalkers (1992) for Columbia Pictures.

In 1994, Logothetis directed and produced Body Shot, a film noir thriller starring Robert Patrick, for HBO. He then moved into the Western genre and produced and directed Cheyenne, starring Bo Svensen and Gary Hudson.

In 1999, Logothetis was hired by Warner Brothers and directed the pilot for the television series Robin Hood. He directed episodes of Mike Hammer, Private Eye, starring Stacy Keach, and of Air America, starring Lorenzo Lamas.

In 2000, Logothetis was hired by Warner Brothers to be the executive producer of the science fiction action adventure TV series Code Name: Eternity. He was responsible for the creative look and feel of the series and for writing and directing the pilot episode. The next year, Warner Brothers asked him to serve as executive producer and to direct another TV anthology, The Dark Realm, where he directed the two-hour pilot episode and supervised the screenwriting. In 2010, Logothetis became President of Production at Kings Road Entertainment. He then re-developed and wrote a series called The Outfit, again based on Giancana, that he set up with Radar Pictures and producer Ted Field. He then set up a remake of All of Me with John Davis and DreamWorks, which he was set to produce. DreamWorks let the option on All of Me expire and Logothetis teamed up with Todd Garner to set up All of Me as a TV series at NBC Universal.

In 2013, Logothetis took up Giancana again, and along with his project partner Nick Celozzi, wrote, produced and directed a documentary, Momo: The Sam Giancana Story, which won the 2012 Hollywood Reel Independent Film Festival "Best Feature Documentary" award. In 2015, he produced Kickboxer: Vengeance, a reboot of the Kickboxer franchise, with Ted Field and Radar Pictures. Logothetis wrote and produced Kickboxer: Vengeance starring Jean-Claude Van Damme and the new kickboxer, Alain Moussi, with other talents such as Dave Bautista, Georges Saint-Pierre, and Gina Carano. Logothetis was attracted to the original Jean-Claude Van Damme's Kickboxer because of his martial arts background and that's what inspired him to pursue the rights to the original, develop a reboot of the franchise and ultimately write, produce and direct a contemporary version of the pop culture, iconic Kickboxer. It was important that Logothetis to convince Van Damme to step into the role of mentor to ordain a new, high octane Kickboxer who has a sixth degree black belt in Jiu-Jitsu, Alain Moussi. According to Den of Geek, "Kickboxer: Vengeance is the nostalgic treat you'd hoped for, the cinematic equivalent of an old, warm, blood stained blanket, that you wrap yourself up in and then hope more people will want to join you under, but most likely won't... it's the respectful way it treats the original that makes it such good entertainment for long time Kickboxer fans". "Kickboxer: Vengeance is a pleasant surprise with a fun twist on the 80s action film but set in modern-day Thailand, and a knowing self-reflexive quality that actually makes it a really enjoyable twist. If you enjoy martial arts, action, a bit of tongue-in-cheek comedy or if you just enjoyed the original Kickboxer, then check out Kickboxer: Vengeance." - Screen Jabber.

In 2016, Logothetis wrote and directed the sequel, Kickboxer: Retaliation, which introduced new characters, Mongkut, played by Hafþór Júlíus Björnsson and Thomas Moore, played by Christopher Lambert. Kickboxer: Retaliation got 92% from critics and 84% from the audience on Rotten Tomatoes. Kickboxer: Retaliation is #6 Martial Arts Movie on Netflix with the Highest Rotten Tomatoes Score. According to Men's Health, during the week of September 29, 2020, Kickboxer: Vengeance film was in the top 15 most viewed action films on Netflix. "Kickboxer Retaliation" is one of the Best Action Movies of 2018" and is in The Top 50 Action Gems of the Decade. According to Forbes, "If you aren't watching the new Kickboxer movies, you're doing it wrong. As action reboots go, the Kickboxer remake films–Vengeance, and now Retaliation–nail the action vibe better than The Expendables movies ever did, and without necessarily pandering to nostalgia, either". Logothetis has said that his martial arts background shaped the fight scenes in Kickboxer: Retaliation, including the prison sequence, which was filmed as a continuous take so that Alain Moussi's performance would not be disguised by cuts.

2020 saw the release of Logothetis's science fiction martial arts film Jiu Jitsu starring Alain Moussi, Nicolas Cage, and Tony Jaa. Shot on the island of Cyprus, it was the beginning of a new martial arts franchise. It was #4 on Netflix in the US and #1 on Netflix in Canada the week of its release.

Gunner, an action film starring Morgan Freeman and Luke Hemsworth, was released in select theaters and on digital on August 16, 2024. Gunner ranked #8 across all genres on Apple TV in the U.S. and reached #3 in the Action & Adventure category during its release week. Internationally, Gunner also made waves, reaching the #1 spot on Amazon Prime in France during its first week of release.

== Awards ==
In 2024 and 2025, Dimitri Logothetis received widespread acclaim across the international festival circuit for his work as a director. His feature film Gunner earned Best Feature Film at the Vancouver Independent MovieMaking Awards, while Logothetis himself was honored with Best Director – Feature Film at the New York Film & Actress Awards. The Los Angeles Movie & Music Video Awards recognized Gunner as Best Thriller of 2025, with Morgan Freeman winning Best Actor for his performance. Logothetis also won the Jury Award for Best Directorat the LA Indies Film Fest and received dual Awards of Merit (Film Feature and Direction) from the IndieFEST Film Awards. At the Montreal Independent Film Festival, he was named Best Director, while cinematographer Gerardo Madrazo won Best Cinematography. Additional directorial honors include Best Director at the Art Film Spirit Awards (2024), LA Sun Film Fest (2025), and two directing awards from the Bangkok Movie Awards, including the Critic's Choice Award and Best Director in September 2024.

In addition, another film directed by Dimitri Logothetis, Momo: The Sam Giancana Story won Best Documentary at the 2012 Hollywood Reel Independent Film Festival.

== Project developments ==
Logothetis has been actively developing remake projects from the Kings Road Entertainment Catalog, which lists The Best of Times among its available properties; a film that starred Kurt Russell and Robin Williams. He developed a remake of Kings Road Entertainment's All of Me, which originally starred Steve Martin and Lily Tomlin. In 2015, the producer was announced Todd Garner, former President of production of Disney.

Logothetis is also in the pre-production process for the third and final film in his Kickboxer reboot trilogy, Kickboxer: Armageddon, a new action thriller, Flying Shadow, as well as a sequel to Jiu Jitsu.

A series titled Operation: Kickboxer was in development in October 2022 (Garner, Logothetis, Gary Scott Thompson as showrunner).

In July 2026, Logothetis told Ta Nea that he had completed a screenplay for a heist film about sculptures removed from Greece in the 19th century.

Also in 2026, it was announced that Logothetis is developing an animated project - Kickboxer Rebirth, which reimagines the franchise through anime.
