= Adrian Holmes =

Canadian actor (born 1974)

- Born: March 31, 1974 (age 52); Wrexham, Wales
- Occupation: Actor
- Years active: 1991–present
- Spouse: Caroline Chikezie

Adrian Holmes (born March 31, 1974) is a Welsh-born Canadian actor who is known for his role as Nick Barron on the crime drama television series 19-2 (2014–17), for which he won a Canadian Screen Award for Best Actor in a Continuing Leading Dramatic Role. He is also known for playing Philip Banks on Bel-Air and Robert April on Star Trek: Strange New Worlds.

== Early life ==
Holmes was born to Barbadian parents in Wrexham, Wales, and moved with his family to Vancouver, Canada, when he was five. He studied nursing at Langara College, in part to appease his mother, who felt he needed a backup plan if his acting career was unsuccessful. He attended Queen Elizabeth Senior Secondary in Surrey.

== Career ==
Holmes has had a long career, but is best known for his television roles, such as Basqat on Smallville, Marcus Mitchell on True Justice and Frank Pike on Arrow. His most notable role is Nick Barron in the English Language version of 19-2 on Bravo, which garnered him a Canadian Screen Award for Best Actor in a Continuing Leading Dramatic Role in 2017. His film work includes Red Riding Hood, Elysium and The Cabin in the Woods. In 2021 Adrian was cast as Uncle Phil in the show Bel-Air, a reboot turned series drama of The Fresh Prince of Bel Air. Will Smith gave him the stamp of approval. He has recently been cast as the first live-action version of Robert April, the first captain of the USS Enterprise, in Star Trek: Strange New Worlds.

== Filmography ==
=== Film ===
Year	Title	Role	Notes
2005	Two for the Money	G.A. Member #2	
2006	Like Mike 2: Streetball	"Buck Wild"	Direct-to-video
2006	The Hard Corps	"Cujo"	Direct-to-video
2009	Damage	Ray Sharp	Direct-to-video
2010	Hunt to Kill	"Crab"	Direct-to-video
2010	Frankie & Alice	Clifton	
2011	Red Riding Hood	Captain	
2011	Tactical Force	Lampone	Direct-to-video
2011	Wrecked	Man In The Woods	
2011	The Cabin in the Woods	Demo Guy	
2013	Elysium	Manuel	
2014	Debug	Capra	
2015	Vendetta	Drexel	
2015	A Christmas Horror Story	Scott	
2018	Skyscraper	Ajani Okeke	
2019	Enhanced	Captain Williams	
2019	You Light Up My Christmas	Ben	
2020	Chained	Pete	

=== Television ===
Year	Title	Role	Notes
1991	Neon Rider	"Twist"	Episode: "Twist in the Wind"
1992–1993	Highlander: The Series	Street Kid; Johnny	Episode: "The Sea Witch"; Episode: "Run for Your Life"
1993	The Only Way Out	Student	Television film
1994	M.A.N.T.I.S.	Kid	Episode: "Fire in the Heart"
1996–2000	The Outer Limits	Soldier; James	Episode: "The Light Brigade"; Episode: "Gettysburg"
1999	Night Man	Na'il	Episode: "Dust"
1999	Brotherhood of Murder	Teenager	Television film
2002–2006	Stargate SG-1	Special Operations Sergeant; Detective Ryan	Episode: "Nightwalkers"; Episode: "Memento Mori"
2004	Meltdown	Agent Charlie Jansen	Television film
2005–2010	Smallville	Griff; Basqat	7 episodes
2005	Hot Wheels: AcceleRacers	Tork Maddox	Television films Voice
2005	Supervolcano	Dave	Television film
2005–2006	Godiva's	Jerome	5 episodes
2006	Da Vinci's City Hall	Storno	Episode: "Gotta Press the Flesh"
2006	The Evidence	Craig Park	Episode: "Five Little Indians"
2006	Black Lagoon	Rowan	Episode: "Calm Down, Two Men"; Voice
2006	Cries in the Dark	Detective Wynn	Television film
2008	Ice Blues	Somerville	Television film
2008	Bratz Girlz Really Rock	Dylan	Voice
2008	Bratz	Dylan	8 episodes Voice
2008	Ice Blues	Somerville	Television film
2008–2017	Supernatural	Demon; James Turner	3 episodes
2011–2012	True Justice	Marcus Mitchell	12 episodes
2012–2013	Primeval: New World	Detective Harlow	3 episodes
2012–2015	Continuum	Warren; Freelancer	10 episodes
2012	Battlestar Galactica: Blood & Chrome	Zachary Elias	Television film
2013–2018	Arrow	Frank Pike	15 episodes
2013	Cult	Terrence Ross	Episode: "Get with the Program"
2014–2017	19-2	Nick Barron	38 episodes
2016	Barrows: Freedom Fighter	Errol Barrow	Documentary film
2016	Impastor	Agent Landecker	2 episodes
2017	Letterkenny	Bradley	2 episodes
2019	Hospital Show	Rich	10 episodes
2019	V Wars	Michael Fayne	10 episodes
2020	The Boys	Dr. Park	Episode: "Proper Preparation and Planning"
2022–2025	Bel-Air	Philip Banks	30 episodes
2022–present	Star Trek: Strange New Worlds	Admiral Robert April	7 episodes

=== Video games ===
Year	Title	Role	Notes
2004	Def Jam: Fight for NY	Bo	Voice
2010	Medal of Honor	Colonel Drucker	Voice

== Awards and nominations ==
Year	Award	Category	Work	Result	Ref
2004	Leo Awards	Best Guest Performance by a Male in a Dramatic Series	The Collector	Nominated	
2016	Canadian Screen Awards	Best Performance by an Actor in a Continuing Leading Dramatic Role	19-2	Nominated	
2017	Canadian Screen Awards	Best Performance by an Actor in a Continuing Leading Dramatic Role	19-2	Won	
2017	Leo Awards	Best Lead Performance by a Male in a Dramatic Series	19-2	Nominated	

== Personal life ==
Holmes is a member/brother of Alpha Phi Alpha.
