= Alain Moussi =

Canadian actor, stuntman, and martial artist

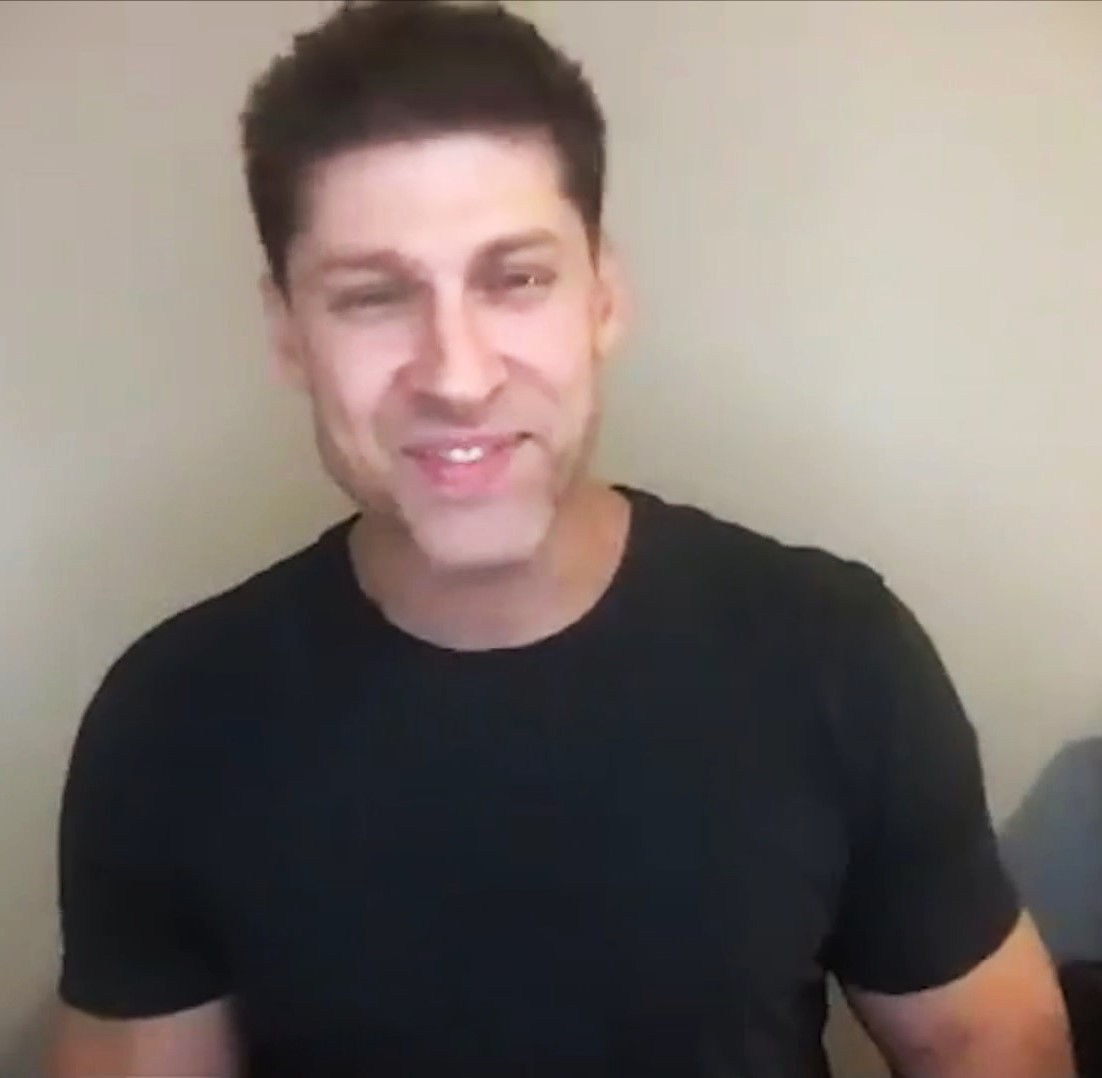
- Moussi in 2020
- Born: Alain Despereaux Moussi
- Trainer: John Therien; Jean-Yves Thériault; Carlos Machado; Richard Morris
- Rank: 6th Dan Black Belt in Jujutsu; 1st Dan Black Belt in Karate
- Years active: 2005–present

Other information
- Occupation: Actor; stuntman
- Children: 1

Alain Moussi is a Canadian actor, stuntman, and martial artist trained in jujutsu, kickboxing, and karate. He plays the lead role of Kurt Sloane in the reboot of the Kickboxer series, Kickboxer: Vengeance (2016) and Kickboxer: Retaliation (2018), a role that was originated by Jean-Claude Van Damme, who portrays his mentor in the films. Moussi also played the lead role in the action film Jiu Jitsu (2020), the role of Charlie Nash in the web series Street Fighter: Resurrection (2016), and Batman in the first season of the television series Titans (2018).

As a stuntman, he has doubled for Henry Cavill (Immortals), Jason Clarke (White House Down), Josh Helman (X-Men: Days of Future Past), Travis Fimmel (Warcraft), Hugh Jackman (X-Men: Apocalypse), and Jai Courtney (Suicide Squad). In addition to stunts and acting, Moussi owns and operates K2 Martial Arts (formerly NX Martial Arts and Fitness) in Orleans, Ottawa, Canada.

== Martial arts ==
Moussi began his martial arts training in the art of jujutsu under Canadian martial arts instructor John Therien as well as practicing kickboxing under kickboxing champion Jean-Yves Thériault. He had also trained in Brazilian jiu-jitsu under Carlos Machado, eventually earning his black belt in the art.

== Film career ==
Moussi got his start as a stuntman and credits Jean Frenette, a former world martial arts champion turned stunt coordinator for films, with giving him his start. His first job was doubling Henry Cavill in the film Immortals. He has also doubled for Aaron Eckhart in Erased, Mike "The Miz" Mizanin in The Marine 3: Homefront and Christmas Bounty, Jason Clarke in White House Down, Josh Helman in X-Men: Days of Future Past, Travis Fimmel in Warcraft, Hugh Jackman in X-Men: Apocalypse, and Jai Courtney in Suicide Squad.

At the 2014 Cannes Film Festival, it was announced by filmmaker Dimitri Logothetis that Moussi would get his first leading role in a reboot of the 1989 film Kickboxer, which starred Jean-Claude Van Damme. In Kickboxer: Vengeance, Moussi played Kurt Sloane, a young martial artist who must refine his skills to avenge his brother's death. Van Damme took on the role of Kurt's teacher, named Master Durand. The film received mixed reviews but resulted in two sequels, Kickboxer: Retaliation, released in 2017, and Kickboxer: Syndicate, which began production in February 2017. The sequels bring Moussi back as Kurt Sloane and in addition, Moussi and longtime friend Jean-Francois LaChappelle served as fight choreographers on Retaliation.

Moussi played the role of Charlie Nash in the web series Street Fighter: Resurrection and also worked on the Titans episode "Dick Grayson", where he and Maxime Savaria did the uncredited stunt performances of Batman.

In 2019, Moussi worked alongside Nicolas Cage, Tony Jaa, Frank Grillo, and JuJu Chan on the sci-fi martial arts film Jiu Jitsu, released in November 2020. In 2021, he had a small role as a thug on a bus who fights Bob Odenkirk's character in the action thriller film Nobody.

== Personal life ==
Moussi's father, Jean Moussi, immigrated to Canada from Lebanon, and his mother, Rita Moussi, is French Canadian. He has a daughter.

== Selected filmography ==
List of appearances, with year, title, and role shown
Year	Title	Role	Notes
2005	NX Files: Discover the Secret	Spike / Ronin	Also writer, producer, and stunt coordinator
2011	The Day	Survivalist	
2012	Transporter: The Series	Tungsten security guard	Uncredited, also stunt performer; episode: "City of Love"
2013	White House Down	Agent Reid's partner	Uncredited, also stunt performer
2014	Pompeii	Celtic gladiator	Uncredited, also stunt performer
2014	Being Human	Bruiser werewolf	Episode: "Oh Don't You Die for Me"
2014	Wolves	Dobie	
2016	Street Fighter: Resurrection	Charlie Nash	Web series; 4 episodes
2016	Kickboxer: Vengeance	Kurt Sloane	Also fight coordinator
2018	Kickboxer: Retaliation	Kurt Sloane	Also fight coordinator
2018	Titans	Batman	Also stunt double and performer; episode: "Dick Grayson"
2019	American Gods	Mr. Town's agent #3	Episode: "The Beguiling Man"
2019	Enhanced	Abel	
2019	V Wars	Gardener	3 episodes
2020	Jiu Jitsu	Jake	Also fight coordinator
2021	Nobody	Bus goon	
2023	King of Killers	Marcus Garan	Also producer
