= Joel Zito Araújo =

Brazilian film director

Joel Zito Araújo is a Brazilian film director, writer, and producer of films and TV programs.

== Early life and education ==
Araújo received his Ph.D. in Communication Sciences from the Escola de Comunicações e Artes at the University of São Paulo in 1999.

== Career ==
Some of his works have won prizes or been selected for screenings at film festivals throughout the world.

== Other activities ==
Araújo was postdoctoral fellow and visiting professor in the Departments of Radio, TV, and Film and Anthropology as well as the Center for African & African-American Studies at the University of Texas at Austin from August 2001 to May 2002.

From 2006 to 2007, Araújo was president of the Brazilian Filmmakers Association.

== Filmography ==
- Raça Full-length documentary co-directed by Araujo and Megan Mylan; co-produced with the North American production company Principe Productions Inc. (New York). Winner of Best Short Documentary 2009. World Premiere as out of competition at the 2012 Rio de Janeiro International Film Festival (10 October 2012). Selected at the FESPACO 2013 – Pan African Film Festival of Ouagadougou (February 2013). Selected at the 35 Festival Internacional del Nuevo Cine Latinoamericano - sessão LATINOAMÉRICA EN PERSPECTIVA. Havana/Cuba - Dez/2013.Selected at the Toulouse Cinelatino Film Festival 2014. It was screened at the British Film Institute in May 2022.
- Daughters of the Wind (As Filhas do Vento) won eight prizes at the 32nd Gramado Film Festival (known as the most important Film Festival in Brazil) in August 2004. Awarded by that Festival jury, the prizes were: Best Director, Best Actor, Best Actress, Best Supporting Actress, Best Supporting Actor and Best Film by the Critics Review. This film also received the Best Film award at the 8th Mostra de Filme de Tiradentes, Minas Gerais in January 2005 and the Best Full-Length Script award at the Second Paratycine Festival, 2005. It also earned the Best Actor and Best Actress awards from the Festival de Cinema de Macapá, in 2005.
- Cinderellas, Wolves and a Prince Charming (Cinderelas, lobos e um príncipe encantado) (107 minutes, HD) was awarded an Honorable Mention at the X Brasília International Film Festival in 2008. It also received the Best Film and the Best Director awards at the 9th Iberoamerican Film Festival of Sergipe (Curta-SE9) in 2009, and the Best Full-Length Documentary prize (from audience) and Honourable Mention from Jury at the VII Mostra Vidas na Tela – Natal. 2009.
- Denying Brazil (A Negação do Brasil) (91 minutes, 35 mm) was awarded a prize by the Brazilian Ministry of Culture, which sponsored the 1999 National Documentary Competition. In 2001, this film received the "Best Brazilian Film award", "the Best Research award" and the Quanta Prize at the 6th International Documentary Festival It's All True - É Tudo Verdade, a Festival that takes place in São Paulo and Rio de Janeiro. It also earned the “Gilberto Freire Film” award and "Best Full-Length Documentary Script award" from the 5th Recife Film Festival in 2001.
- My Friend Fela (Meu amigo Fela) (2019) - won the Paul Robeson Prize at the 26th FESPACO
