= Barrows: Freedom Fighter =

2019 Barbados Documentary film

- Directed by: Marcia Weekes
- Screenplay by: Marcia Weekes
- Produced by: Marietta Carter-Narcisse; Adrian Holmes; Marcia Weekes
- Starring: Lisa Arrindell; Adrian Holmes; Eric Holder
- Cinematography: Curtis Graham
- Edited by: Shimar Gollop & Dan-Jamal Weekes
- Release date: October 1, 2016
- Running time: 1h 20min
- Country: Barbados
- Language: English
- Budget: $250,000 (estimated)

Barrows: Freedom Fighter is a documentary film shot in 2016 that centers on how Barbados was led to their independence on November 30, 1966.

It won the Africa Movie Academy Award for Best Diaspora Documentary in 2018.

== Synopsis ==
The story of how Barbados after more than 300 years of being a British colony finally gained independence, led by 'The Right Excellent Errol Walton Barrow' on November 30, 1966 is revealed.

== Cast ==
- Lisa Arrindell as Carolyn Barrow
- Sean Field as Mr. Brathwaite
- Eric Holder as Narrator (as Eric Holder Jr.)
- Adrian Holmes as Errol Barrow
- Robert Christopher Riley as Jean Holder
- Nadia Sarmova as Bank Teller
