= Stubborn as a Mule =

Stubborn as a Mule is a 2010 documentary directed by Arcelious Daniels & Miller Bargeron, Jr., which makes the case for reparations for slavery for African Americans.

== Awards ==
- Best Diaspora Documentary: 2011 Africa Movie Academy Award, Nigeria, Africa
- Best International Film: 2010 Music Video Screen Awards (MVSA), Birmingham, United Kingdom
- Best Film on Matters Relating to the Black Experience/Marginalized People: 2011 Black International Cinema, Berlin, Germany
- Award of Merit: 2010 Accolade Competition, La Jolla, California
- Director's Choice Award: 2010 Portland African-American Film Festival, Portland, Oregon
