= Evolutionary Blues: West Oakland's Music Legacy =

2017 American documentary film

- Directed by: Cheryl Fabio
- Written by: T. Watts
- Produced by: Cheryl Fabio
- Cinematography: Godofredo Dizon
- Edited by: Meadow Holmes
- Release date: October 2017 (USA)
- Running time: 90 minutes
- Country: USA
- Language: English

Evolutionary Blues: West Oakland's Music Legacy, is a 2017 United States documentary film directed by Cheryl Fabio and co-produced by director herself with KTOP and Sarah Webster Fabio Center for Social Justice. The film revolves around the musician West Oakland and the Oakland Blues where described how postwar development impacted African Americans and their musical heritage.

The film received positive reviews and won several awards at international film festivals. The film premiered at the Grand Lake Theatre on 27 September 2017.

== Cast ==
- Alabama Mike
- Betty Marvin
- Dalhart Johnson
- D'Wayne P. Wiggins
- Electra Kimble Price
- The Dynamic Miss Faye Carol
- Freddie W. Hughes
- Fantastic Negrito
- Geoffrey Pete
- Hartfield Brothers
- Chauncey Crosby
- David C Hartfield, Sr.
- Robert Hartfield
- Isabel Wilkerson
- James A. Levi
- James C. Moore, Sr.
- Jesse James
- John Turk
- Lady Bianca
- Larry Payton
- Larry Vann
- Lee Hildebrand
- Leon “Denianke” Williams
- Lenny Williams
- Marvin Holmes
- Nicholas Harper
- Paul Tillman Smith
- Rickey Vincent
- Robert Geddins, Jr.
- Robert O. Self
- Ronald A. Wells
- Ronnie K. Stewart
- Sonny Rhodes
- Sugar Pie DeSanto
- “Terrible Tom” Bowden, Jr.
- Wylie Trass
