= I Gotta Be Me (webseries) =

I Gotta Be Me is a web series starring Phaldut Sharma as an actor, Paul Shah, who is given the role of Sammy Davis Jr. in a Rat Pack tribute show. The tribute show is filmed as part of a faux documentary.

The series stars Phaldut Sharma as Paul Shah/Sammy Davis Jr., Martin Rhodes as Frank Sinatra, and Andrew Oliver, David Locke, John Hughes, Karen Kendall, Angela Rhodes, and Chris King as Elvis Presley.

The series has nine episodes:

1. Faraway Close
2. I Gotta Be Me
3. Bums on Seats
4. The Chairman of the Board
5. Birth of the Blues...
6. 'How Long Have I Been On?'
7. That's Life
8. Why Me?
9. That's Amore!
