= Angelica (2016 film) =

2016 Puerto Rico drama film

- Directed by: Marisol Gomez-Mouakad
- Written by: Marisol Gómez-Mouakad
- Produced by: Marisol Gómez-Mouakad
- Starring: Michelle Nono; Johanna Rosaly; Willie Denton; Rene Monclova; Yamil Collazo; Modesto Lacen; Kisha Tikina Burgos
- Cinematography: Erika Licea Orozco
- Edited by: Marisol Gómez-Mouakad
- Release date: September 30, 2016
- Running time: 100 minutes
- Country: Puerto Rico
- Language: Spanish

Angelica is a Puerto Rico film made in 2016 by Marisol Gómez-Mouakad. Based on colorism, sexism and racism, the movie centers on a girl with an Afro-Latino father and a white Latina mother who aspires to be a Fashion designer and faces discrimination from her mother.

The effects and her journey on finding her identity and standing up for herself is portrayed along with her struggles throughout the movie. It won an award at the Africa Movie Academy Award for Best Diaspora Feature in 2018.

== Synopsis ==
Angelica, an African-Puerto Rican, has spent her whole life fighting to affirm, legitimize and explore her Africaness inside her family and in Puerto Rico, a society that denigrates and dismisses her Africaness. A rare drama that looks at the color contradictions and consequences in Puerto Rico and throughout the Afro-Latin world.

== Cast ==
- Michelle Nono
- Johanna Rosaly
- Willie Denton
- Rene Monclova
- Yamil Collazo
- Modesto Lacen
- Kisha Tikina Burgos
