= UFC 202 =

UFC mixed martial arts event in 2016

UFC 202: Diaz vs. McGregor 2
- The poster for UFC 202: Diaz vs. McGregor 2
- Promotion: Ultimate Fighting Championship
- Date: August 20, 2016
- Venue: T-Mobile Arena
- City: Paradise, Nevada
- Attendance: 15,539
- Total gate: $7,700,810
- Buyrate: 1,650,000

Event chronology
| UFC Fight Night: Rodríguez vs. Caceres | UFC 202: Diaz vs. McGregor 2 | UFC on Fox: Maia vs. Condit |

UFC 202: Diaz vs. McGregor 2 was a mixed martial arts event produced by the Ultimate Fighting Championship that was held on August 20, 2016, at the T-Mobile Arena in Paradise, Nevada, part of the Las Vegas metropolitan area.

This event was the first one under the full control of the new ownership group consisting of William Morris Endeavor, Silver Lake Partners, Kohlberg Kravis Roberts and MSD Capital.

This event was the most bought UFC pay-per-view of all time with a buyrate of 1.65 million, until UFC 229 (which also featured McGregor in the main event) broke the record with 2.4 million.

== Background ==
The event was headlined by a welterweight rematch between The Ultimate Fighter 5 winner and former lightweight title challenger Nate Diaz and UFC Featherweight Champion Conor McGregor.

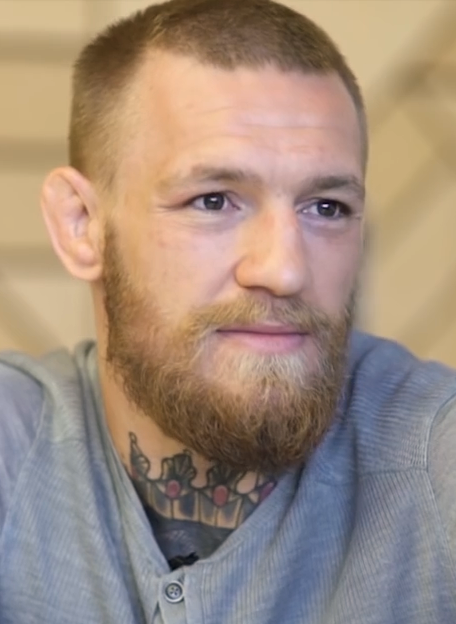
UFC President Dana White said they worked on booking the rematch due to "McGregor's obsession with it".

The pairing previously met earlier in the year at UFC 196. McGregor was expected to challenge then UFC Lightweight Champion Rafael dos Anjos, but Dos Anjos pulled out due to a broken foot only 11 days before the event. Diaz eventually replaced him and the bout was shifted to the welterweight division. Diaz won the fight via rear-naked choke in the second round. Their rematch was originally expected to take place at UFC 200, but everything changed during mid-April, as a disagreement between McGregor and the UFC, regarding his media schedule, led to his removal from the event and then Diaz was also pulled out.

A bout between former UFC Light Heavyweight Championship challengers Anthony Johnson and Glover Teixeira was expected to serve as the co-main event for UFC on Fox: Holm vs. Shevchenko. However, Johnson pulled out one month before the event to tend to personal issues. In turn, promotion officials elected to pull Teixeira from the card and the pairing was left intact and rescheduled to take place at this event.

Dong Hyun Kim was expected to face Neil Magny at the event. However, Kim pulled out due to injury on July 12 and was replaced by Lorenz Larkin.

A welterweight contest between former WEC Welterweight Champion and former interim UFC Welterweight Champion Carlos Condit and Demian Maia, a former UFC Middleweight Championship challenger, was scheduled to take place at this event, but was moved a week later to headline an already scheduled FOX event.

Sultan Aliev was expected to face Lim Hyun-gyu at the event. However, Aliev pulled out of the fight in early August citing a wrist injury. Lim faced promotional newcomer Mike Perry.

On August 5, Sean Strickland pulled out of his planned bout against Tim Means due to a knee injury. He was replaced by promotional newcomer Sabah Homasi.

The Ultimate Fighter: China winner Ning Guangyou tested positive for clenbuterol from an out-of-competition sample taken May 19, but USADA found he ingested the substance without fault or negligence. They reviewed the evidence of the case – Ning's whereabouts, dietary habits and the lab reports showing "very low parts per billion concentrations" of the substance – and determined that it very likely came from tainted meat, as countries like Mexico and China have a high risk for meats contaminated with the substance. Ning will not face a suspension. He was expected to face Marlon Vera at this event, but due to this incident the bout was pushed back one week for UFC on Fox: Maia vs. Condit.

== Results ==
Main Card
| Weight class | | | | Method | Round | Time | Notes |
|---|---|---|---|---|---|---|---|
| Welterweight | Conor McGregor | def. | Nate Diaz | Decision (majority) (48–47, 47–47, 48–47) | 5 | 5:00 |
| Light Heavyweight | Anthony Johnson | def. | Glover Teixeira | KO (punch) | 1 | 0:13 |
| Welterweight | Donald Cerrone | def. | Rick Story | TKO (knee and punches) | 2 | 2:02 |
| Welterweight | Mike Perry | def. | Lim Hyun-gyu | TKO (punches) | 1 | 3:38 |
| Welterweight | Tim Means | def. | Sabah Homasi | TKO (punches) | 2 | 2:56 |
Preliminary Card (Fox Sports 1)
| Bantamweight | Cody Garbrandt | def. | Takeya Mizugaki | TKO (punches) | 1 | 0:48 |
| Women's Bantamweight | Raquel Pennington | def. | Elizabeth Phillips | Decision (unanimous) (30–27, 30–27, 30–27) | 3 | 5:00 |
| Featherweight | Artem Lobov | def. | Chris Avila | Decision (unanimous) (30–27, 30–27, 30–27) | 3 | 5:00 |
| Women's Strawweight | Cortney Casey | def. | Randa Markos | Verbal Submission (armbar) | 1 | 4:34 |
Preliminary Card (UFC Fight Pass)
| Welterweight | Lorenz Larkin | def. | Neil Magny | TKO (elbows) | 1 | 4:08 |
| Welterweight | Colby Covington | def. | Max Griffin | TKO (punches) | 3 | 2:18 |
| Middleweight | Marvin Vettori | def. | Alberto Uda | Submission (guillotine choke) | 1 | 4:30 |

== Bonus awards ==
The following fighters were awarded $50,000 bonuses:

- Fight of the Night: Conor McGregor vs. Nate Diaz
- Performance of the Night: Anthony Johnson and Donald Cerrone

== Reported payout ==
The following is the reported payout to the fighters as reported to the Nevada State Athletic Commission. It does not include sponsor money and also does not include the UFC's traditional "fight night" bonuses. The total disclosed payout for the event was $6,106,000.

- Conor McGregor: $3,000,000 (no win bonus) def. Nate Diaz: $2,000,000
- Anthony Johnson: $270,000 (includes $135,000 win bonus) def. Glover Teixeira: $65,000
- Donald Cerrone: $170,000 (includes $85,000 win bonus) def. Rick Story: $41,000
- Mike Perry: $20,000 (includes $10,000 win bonus) def. Hyun Gyu Lim: $18,000
- Tim Means: $62,000 (includes $31,000 win bonus) def. Sabah Homasi: $12,000
- Cody Garbrandt: $54,000 (includes $27,000 win bonus) def. Takeya Mizugaki: $39,000
- Raquel Pennington: $46,000 (includes $23,000 win bonus) def. Elizabeth Phillips: $12,000
- Artem Lobov: $26,000 (includes $13,000 win bonus) def. Chris Avila: $10,000
- Cortney Casey: $40,000 (includes $20,000 win bonus) def. Randa Markos: $14,000
- Lorenz Larkin: $78,000 (includes $39,000 win bonus) def. Neil Magny: $47,000
- Colby Covington: $42,000 (includes $21,000 win bonus) def. Max Griffin: $10,000
- Marvin Vettori: $20,000 (includes $10,000 win bonus) def. Alberto Uda: $10,000

== Records set ==
McGregor's fight purse was the highest in history, breaking Brock Lesnar's record from UFC 200 by $500,000. Also, this event estimates doing 1.65 million buys on pay-per-view, putting it slightly ahead of the previous record (1.6 million) from UFC 100, which featured the second bout between Brock Lesnar and Frank Mir.

== See also ==
- List of UFC events
- 2016 in UFC
