= Justin Salas =

American mixed martial arts fighter

- Born: Justin Bernard Salas; March 13, 1982 (age 44); Green River, Wyoming, U.S.
- Other names: J-Bomb
- Height: 5 ft 8 in (173 cm)
- Weight: 155 lb (70 kg; 11 st 1 lb)
- Division: Lightweight (155 lb)
- Reach: 70.0 in (178 cm)
- Fighting out of: Denver, Colorado
- Team: Grudge Training Center
- Rank: Blue belt in Brazilian Jiu-Jitsu
- Wrestling: NCAA Division I Wrestling
- Years active: 2006-present

Mixed martial arts record
- Total: 19
- Wins: 12
- By knockout: 4
- By submission: 3
- By decision: 5
- Losses: 7
- By knockout: 4
- By submission: 3

Other information
- Mixed martial arts record from Sherdog

Justin Bernard Salas (born March 13, 1982) is an American mixed martial artist who competes as a lightweight. He was signed with the Ultimate Fighting Championship from 2012 to 2016.

== Background ==
Salas is from Green River, Wyoming, and had a very successful career in wrestling. Salas was a two-time State Champion in high school, as well as a two-time high school All-American, in addition to winning the Dave Schultz High School Hall of Fame Award. Salas then went on to wrestle for the University of Wyoming's NCAA Division I program from 2000 to 2003, but dropped out of college to pursue a career in mixed martial arts.

== Mixed martial arts career ==
=== Ultimate Fighting Championship ===
On January 16, 2012, it was announced that Salas has signed a multi-fight deal with the UFC. He made his promotional debut on February 15 against fellow newcomer Anton Kuivanen in UFC on Fuel TV 1. He won via unanimous decision.

Salas faced Tim Means on June 8, 2012, at UFC on FX 3. Means defeated Salas via first-round TKO.

Salas was expected to face Edson Barboza on January 19, 2013, at UFC on FX 7. However, Salas was forced out of the bout with an injury and replaced by promotional newcomer Lucas Martins.

Salas faced Aaron Riley on July 27, 2013, at UFC on Fox 8. He won the back-and-forth fight by split decision.

Salas faced Thiago Tavares on November 9, 2013, at UFC Fight Night 32, replacing an injured Quinn Mulhern. He lost the fight via submission in the first round.

Salas faced Ben Wall on May 10, 2014, at UFC Fight Night 40. He won the fight via knockout in the first round.

Salas faced Joe Proctor on July 16, 2014, at UFC Fight Night 45. Salas lost the bout via second-round TKO.

Salas faced Jason Saggo on March 5, 2016, at UFC 196. He lost the fight via TKO in the first round and was subsequently released from the promotion.

== Championships and accomplishments ==
- Full Force Fighting
  - FFF Lightweight Championship (One time)

== Mixed martial arts record ==
Professional record breakdown
19 matches	12 wins	7 losses
By knockout	4	4
By submission	3	3
By decision	5	0

Res.	Record	Opponent	Method	Event	Date	Round	Time	Location	Notes
Loss	12–7	Jason Saggo	TKO (punches)	UFC 196	March 5, 2016	1	4:31	Las Vegas, Nevada, United States	
Loss	12–6	Joe Proctor	TKO (punches)	UFC Fight Night: Cowboy vs. Miller	July 16, 2014	2	3:27	Atlantic City, New Jersey, United States	
Win	12–5	Ben Wall	KO (punches)	UFC Fight Night: Brown vs. Silva	May 10, 2014	1	2:21	Cincinnati, Ohio, United States	
Loss	11–5	Thiago Tavares	Submission (rear-naked choke)	UFC Fight Night: Belfort vs. Henderson 2	November 9, 2013	1	2:38	Goiânia, Brazil	
Win	11–4	Aaron Riley	Decision (split)	UFC on Fox: Johnson vs. Moraga	July 27, 2013	3	5:00	Seattle, Washington, United States	
Loss	10–4	Tim Means	TKO (knee and punches)	UFC on FX: Johnson vs. McCall 2	June 8, 2012	1	1:06	Sunrise, Florida, United States	
Win	10–3	Anton Kuivanen	Decision (unanimous)	UFC on Fuel TV: Sanchez vs. Ellenberger	February 15, 2012	3	5:00	Omaha, Nebraska, United States	
Win	9–3	Joe Ellenberger	Decision (unanimous)	Victory Fighting Championship 36	October 14, 2011	5	5:00	Council Bluffs, Iowa, United States	
Win	8–3	Rob Emerson	Decision (unanimous)	Full Force Fighting - Vol. 1	January 30, 2011	3	5:00	Denver, Colorado, United States	Won the FFF Lightweight Championship.
Win	7–3	Matt Simms	TKO (punches)	Fight To Win/King of Champions: Worlds Collide	July 24, 2010	2	2:14	Denver, Colorado, United States	
Win	6–3	Robert Simmons	TKO (punches)	Fight To Win: Phenoms	January 30, 2010	1	1:40	Denver, Colorado, United States	
Win	5–3	Josh Arocho	Submission (rear-naked choke)	Midwest Championship Fighting: Resurrection	October 24, 2009	1	3:53	North Platte, Nebraska, United States	
Loss	4–3	Eddie Pelczynski	TKO (punches)	Ring of Fire 35: Summer Brawl	August 1, 2009	1	0:09	Broomfield, Colorado, United States	
Loss	4–2	Andrew Chappelle	Submission (triangle choke)	Ring of Fire 33: Adrenaline	January 10, 2009	1	2:06	Broomfield, Colorado, United States	
Win	4–1	Eric Fagyas	Submission (guillotine choke)	Warriors Collide 4	July 19, 2008	1	1:09	Cripple Creek, Colorado, United States	
Win	3–1	Max Smith	Submission (rear-naked choke)	Ring of Fire 32: Respect	June 13, 2008	1	1:26	Broomfield, Colorado, United States	
Win	2–1	Kris Hartman	Decision (majority)	Ring of Fire 27: Collision Course	December 9, 2006	2	5:00	Castle Rock, Colorado, United States	
Win	1–1	Corey Lieberth	KO (punches)	Midwest Championship Fighting: Genesis	November 18, 2006	1	1:33	North Platte, Nebraska, United States	
Loss	0–1	Corey Lieberth	Submission (armbar)	Victory Fighting Championship 13: Redemption	May 13, 2006	3	N/A	North Platte, Nebraska, United States	

== See also ==
- List of male mixed martial artists
