= MVP MMA: Rousey vs. Carano =

2026 mixed martial arts event

- The poster for MVP MMA: Rousey vs. Carano
- Promotion: Most Valuable Promotions
- Date: May 16, 2026
- Venue: Intuit Dome
- City: Inglewood, California, United States
- Attendance: 15,795
- Total gate: $2.2 million

MVP MMA: Rousey vs. Carano (also known as MVP MMA 1) was a mixed martial arts event produced by Most Valuable Promotions that took place on May 16, 2026, at the Intuit Dome in Inglewood, California, United States.

== Background ==
This event was the first-ever MMA event produced by Most Valuable Promotions, which also aired on Netflix.

Commentary for the event's live Netflix broadcast was provided by Mauro Ranallo on play-by-play, Kenny Florian as color analyst, and Sean Wheelock as rules analyst.

A women's featherweight bout between former Strikeforce and UFC Women's Bantamweight Champion Ronda Rousey and Gina Carano served as the event headliner.

A five round welterweight bout between The Ultimate Fighter 5 lightweight winner Nate Diaz and Mike Perry took place as the co-main event.

Former UFC Heavyweight Champion Francis Ngannou faced 2018 PFL Heavyweight Tournament winner Philipe Lins in a five round heavyweight bout at the event.

A welterweight bout between former Bellator Welterweight World Champion Jason Jackson and Lorenz Larkin was scheduled at this event. However, Larkin pulled out due to an injury and was replaced by Jefferson Creighton.

A flyweight bout between undefeated prospect Muhammad Mokaev and former three-time ONE Flyweight World Champion Adriano Moraes was scheduled for this event, but Mokaev pulled out due to visa issues and was replaced by Phumi Nkuta, with the fight proceeding as a 130‑pound catchweight bout.

The Netflix broadcast peaked at 11.6 million viewers in America, breaking the record for most-watched mixed martial arts event of all-time that was previously held by UFC on Fox 1.

== Subsequent events ==
During the event, referee Herb Dean initially ruled that Phumi Nkuta lost to Adriano Moraes by technical submission at the last second of the fight, resulting in the first loss of Nkuta's career. However, it was unclear whether Nkuta was unconscious before the final bell, and it appeared that Moraes illegally held onto the submission after the fight was over, prompting controversy and open deliberation among the commentators. Nkuta immediately challenged the ruling in a post-fight interview with Ariel Helwani and suggested a rematch. On a subsequent Instagram post, Nkuta stated that "the world knows I probably got screwed on that one." On the night of the event, Nkuta's agency filed a formal appeal with the California State Athletic Commission (CSAC) on Nkuta's behalf, positing that Nkuta was only unconscious because Moraes held the choke after the conclusion of the round, and that Nkuta would have won by decision if the fight had gone to the scorecards. Dean defended his initial ruling and maintained that Nkuta was unconscious before the bell.

On July 13, 2026, CSAC denied the appeal, leaving the initial ruling intact. Executive director Andy Foster argued that there wasn't enough clear or convincing evidence to overturn the decision.

== Results ==
Main card (Netflix)
Weight class				Method	Round	Time	Notes
Women's Featherweight	Ronda Rousey	def.	Gina Carano	Submission (armbar)	1	0:17
Welterweight	Mike Perry	def.	Nate Diaz	TKO (corner stoppage)	2	5:00
Heavyweight	Francis Ngannou	def.	Philipe Lins	KO (punch)	1	4:31
Lightweight	Salahdine Parnasse	def.	Kenneth Cross	TKO (punches)	1	4:18
Heavyweight	Robelis Despaigne	def.	Junior dos Santos	KO (punches)	1	2:59
Preliminary card (YouTube)
Welterweight	Namo Fazil	def.	Jake Babian	Submission (anaconda choke)	2	0:58
Catchweight (130 lb)	Adriano Moraes	def.	Phumi Nkuta	Technical Submission (rear-naked choke)	3	4:59
Welterweight	Jason Jackson	def.	Jefferson Creighton	KO (punch)	1	0:20
Featherweight	David Mgoyan	def.	Albert Morales	Decision (unanimous) (29–28, 30–26, 30–27)	3	5:00
Catchweight (130 lb)	Aline Pereira	def.	Jade Masson-Wong	Decision (split) (29–28, 27-30, 29–28)	3	5:00
Catchweight (165 lb)	Brandon Jenkins	def.	Chris Avila	Decision (split) (29–28, 29–28, 28-29)	3	5:00

== Bonus awards ==
The following fighters received bonuses.

- Fight of the Night ($50,000): Adriano Moraes vs. Phumi Nkuta
- Performance of the Night ($100,000): Francis Ngannou

== Reported payout ==
The following is the reported payout to the fighters as reported to the California State Athletic Commission. It does not include sponsor money and also does not include any post-fight bonuses.

- Ronda Rousey: $2,200,000 def. Gina Carano: $1,050,000
- Mike Perry: $400,000 def. Nate Diaz: $500,000
- Francis Ngannou: $1,500,000 def. Philipe Lins: $100,000
- Salahdine Parnasse: $70,000 def. Kenneth Cross: $50,000
- Robelis Despaigne: $50,000 def. Junior dos Santos: $80,000
- Namo Fazil: $40,000 def. Jake Babian: $40,000
- Adriano Moraes: $80,000 def. Phumi Nkuta: $60,000
- Jason Jackson: $110,000 def. Jefferson Creighton: $50,000
- David Mgoyan: $50,000 def. Albert Morales: $40,000
- Aline Pereira: $40,000 def. Jade Masson-Wong: $40,000
- Brandon Jenkins: $40,000 def. Chris Avila: $50,000
