= UFC 200 =

UFC mixed martial arts event in 2016

UFC 200: Tate vs Nunes
- The poster for UFC 200: Tate vs Nunes
- Promotion: Ultimate Fighting Championship
- Date: July 9, 2016
- Venue: T-Mobile Arena
- City: Paradise, Nevada
- Attendance: 18,202
- Total gate: $10,700,000
- Buyrate: 1,009,000

Event chronology
The Ultimate Fighter: Team Joanna vs. Team Cláudia Finale	UFC 200: Tate vs Nunes	UFC Fight Night: McDonald vs. Lineker

UFC 200: Tate vs. Nunes was a mixed martial arts event produced by the Ultimate Fighting Championship held on July 9, 2016, at the T-Mobile Arena on the Las Vegas Strip in Paradise, Nevada.

It was the final UFC event under the ownership of Frank and Lorenzo Fertitta, which began in January 2001. Zuffa subsequently announced its sale to a group led by WME-IMG, an American talent agency with offices in Beverly Hills, which included Silver Lake Partners, Kohlberg Kravis Roberts, and MSD Partners.

== Background ==
The event was the first that the organization has hosted at T-Mobile Arena, which opened in April 2016. It took place during the UFC's annual International Fight Week and marked the second time the UFC hosted three events in consecutive days.

=== Main event changes: McGregor is pulled; Jones tests positive; Tate-Nunes headline ===
A welterweight rematch between The Ultimate Fighter 5 winner and former lightweight title challenger Nate Diaz and the then current UFC Featherweight Champion Conor McGregor was originally expected to headline the event. The pairing previously met earlier in the year at UFC 196, where Diaz defeated McGregor via rear-naked choke in the second round. McGregor was expected to challenge UFC Lightweight Champion Rafael dos Anjos, but dos Anjos pulled out due to a broken foot only 11 days before the event. Diaz eventually replaced him and the bout was shifted to the welterweight division.

On April 19, after McGregor tweeted a supposed retirement, the UFC announced that he was pulled from the event and a replacement for him was being sought. UFC President Dana White clarified that McGregor's removal was related to his refusal to come to a press conference that week, because "he was in Iceland training and didn't want to ruin his preparation for the fight". McGregor released a statement two days later, claiming he was not retired and that he requested the UFC to allow him to focus more on the fight preparation this time, as he felt he lost his focus during the media obligations for the previous fight. He then stated that he was ready for the event and would come for a scheduled New York press conference, but if that's not enough, he "doesn't know what to say". A report later claimed that the UFC decided to cancel the fight indeed, in what was rumored to be a $10 million paycheck for McGregor.

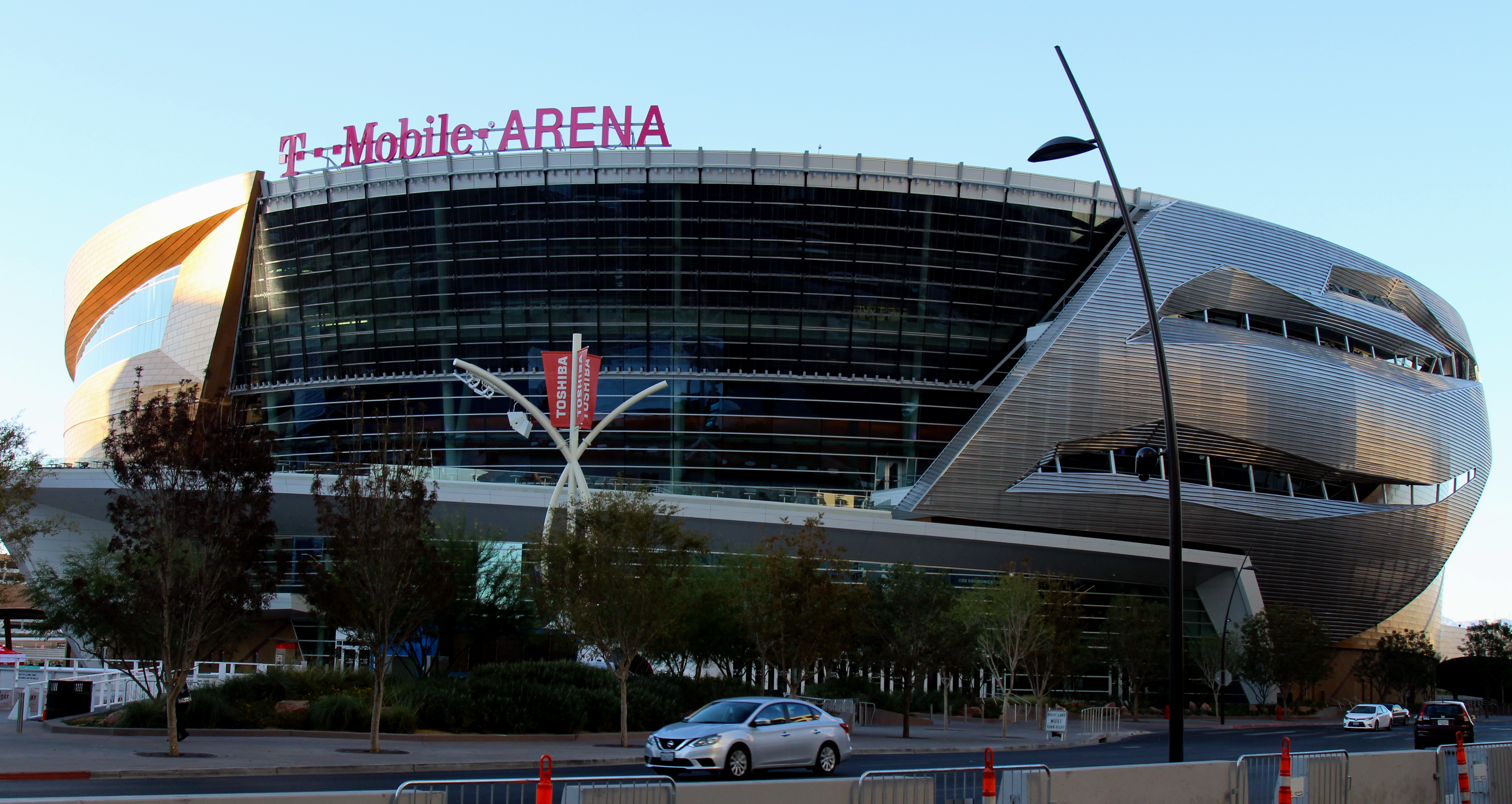
T-Mobile Arena hosted the much anticipated event, which was the 363rd overall in UFC history

On April 27, the UFC officially announced the new headliner as a UFC Light Heavyweight Championship unification rematch between Daniel Cormier and Jon Jones. The pairing met previously at UFC 182 in January 2015 with Jones defending his title via unanimous decision. Subsequent to that victory, Jones was stripped of the title and suspended indefinitely from the UFC in connection with a hit-and-run incident that he was involved in. Cormier replaced him and went on to defeat Anthony Johnson at UFC 187 to win the vacant title. Their rematch was originally expected to take place at UFC 197, but Cormier pulled out three weeks before the event due to injury and was replaced by Ovince Saint Preux, in what became an interim title bout. Jones went on to defeat Saint Preux by unanimous decision and won the interim title.

The event suffered another major hit only three days before it happened, as it was announced that Jones was pulled out by USADA due to a potential Anti-Doping Policy violation stemming from an out-of-competition sample collection on June 16. Cormier declared he would still fight if an opponent brought to him "made sense". A day later Jones apologized for the incident, but denied knowingly taking any illegal substance. He and his manager also declined to specify the substance that resulted in the failed test. His "B" sample also came positive for the same substances and Jones' faced a potential two-year suspension.

During the UFC Fight Night: dos Anjos vs. Alvarez broadcast, it was announced that former UFC Middleweight Champion Anderson Silva would replace Jones on less than two days' notice and face Cormier in a three-round non-title light heavyweight bout.

Due to those major changes, the already scheduled UFC Women's Bantamweight Championship bout between then champion Miesha Tate and top contender Amanda Nunes was revealed as the new main event.

=== Main card: a former champion returns; an interim champion is crowned ===
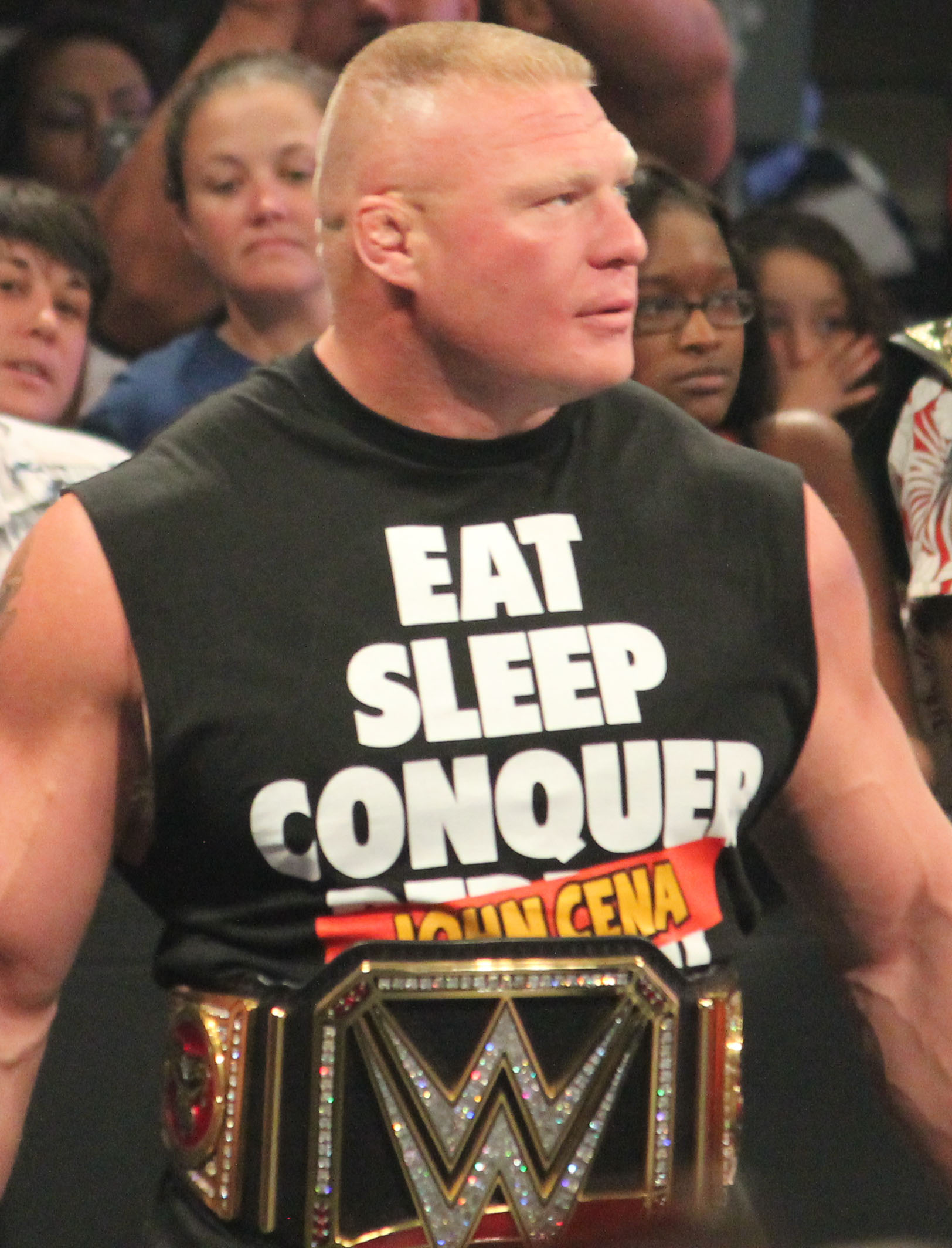
Former UFC Heavyweight Champion Brock Lesnar had a leave of absence from the WWE to compete at this event, his first fight since UFC 141 in December 2011

On June 4, a few hours before the UFC 199 event, MMAFighting.com reporter Ariel Helwani broke the news that former UFC Heavyweight Champion Brock Lesnar was close to finalizing a deal to return at this event, despite being active in the WWE. The UFC confirmed the report, via a teaser video clip on the UFC 199 main card broadcast. However, Helwani's news scoop earned him a prompt physical ejection from the event venue and a lifetime ban from covering future UFC live events. The organization faced a major backlash from the media community as well as fans, before reinstating Helwani's media credentials. They also stated that it was their belief "recurring tactics used" by Helwani "extended beyond the purpose of journalism", a statement that MMAFighting.com disagreed with.

Lesnar faced the 2001 K-1 World Grand Prix winner and former interim title contender Mark Hunt. Due to Jones' removal from the card, this bout was briefly promoted as the new main event. However, after the Tate-Nunes bout was announced as the new headliner, Lesnar-Hunt was once again confirmed as the co-main event. Lesnar also headlined UFC 100 and with Jones' absence, he and Jim Miller remained as the only two fighters to compete at both milestone events.

Due to McGregor's experiments outside of his division, an interim UFC Featherweight Championship bout between former champion José Aldo and former lightweight champion Frankie Edgar took place at this event. It was a rematch, as Aldo previously defended his title against Edgar at UFC 156 in 2013 via unanimous decision. Aldo once again won by unanimous decision.

The main card opened with a heavyweight bout between former two-time champion Cain Velasquez and Travis Browne.

=== Stacked under-card ===
The featured bout of the preliminary card was a women's bantamweight contest between former title challenger Cat Zingano and The Ultimate Fighter: Team Rousey vs. Team Tate winner Julianna Peña. A few other bouts were also part of the Fox Sports 1 televised prelims:

- a welterweight bout between former UFC Welterweight Champion Johny Hendricks and The Ultimate Fighter: Team Jones vs. Team Sonnen winner Kelvin Gastelum.
- a bantamweight rematch between former UFC Bantamweight Champion T.J. Dillashaw and Raphael Assunção. The pairing first met at UFC Fight Night: Maia vs. Shields in October 2013, when Assunção won a close bout via split decision.
- Opening that portion of the event in the lightweight division was a bout between Sage Northcutt and Enrique Marín.

A lightweight bout between Joe Lauzon and The Ultimate Fighter 1 winner and former lightweight title challenger Diego Sanchez was originally booked for UFC 180. However, the bout was cancelled due to both fighters being injured. The fight was later rescheduled for this event and headlined the UFC Fight Pass preliminary card.

A middleweight bout between former Strikeforce Light Heavyweight Champion Gegard Mousasi and Derek Brunson was expected to take place at the event, but on June 19 it was announced that Brunson pulled out due to injury and was replaced by Thiago Santos.

Former PRIDE Lightweight Champion Takanori Gomi and Jim Miller were chosen to open the event in a lightweight bout.

=== Weigh-ins ===
At the weigh-ins, Hendricks missed weight by a quarter of a pound, weighing in at 171.25 lb. He was not given a second attempt to make the weight because the recently introduced early weigh-in procedures set a 10:00 a.m. cut-off time and Hendricks weighed in at the last possible moment. As a result, he was fined 20% of his fight purse, which went to Gastelum.

== Results ==
Main Card
Weight class				Method	Round	Time	Notes
Women's Bantamweight	Amanda Nunes	def.	Miesha Tate (c)	Submission (rear-naked choke)	1	3:16	(Note: For the UFC Women's Bantamweight Championship.)
Heavyweight	Brock Lesnar	vs.	Mark Hunt	No Contest (overturned)	3	5:00	(Note: Originally ruled a unanimous decision (29–27, 29–27, 29–27) victory for Lesnar, the result was changed to "No Contest" after Lesnar tested positive for a banned substance during a post-fight screening.)
Light Heavyweight	Daniel Cormier (c)	def.	Anderson Silva	Decision (unanimous) (30–26, 30–26, 30–26)	3	5:00	(Note: Non-title bout.)
Featherweight	José Aldo	def.	Frankie Edgar	Decision (unanimous) (49–46, 49–46, 48–47)	5	5:00	(Note: For the interim UFC Featherweight Championship.)
Heavyweight	Cain Velasquez	def.	Travis Browne	TKO (punches)	1	4:57
Preliminary Card (Fox Sports 1)
Women's Bantamweight	Julianna Peña	def.	Cat Zingano	Decision (unanimous) (29–28, 29–28, 29–28)	3	5:00
Catchweight (171.25 lb)	Kelvin Gastelum	def.	Johny Hendricks	Decision (unanimous) (29–28, 30–27, 30–27)	3	5:00
Bantamweight	T.J. Dillashaw	def.	Raphael Assunção	Decision (unanimous) (30–27, 30–27, 30–27)	3	5:00
Lightweight	Sage Northcutt	def.	Enrique Marín	Decision (unanimous) (29–28, 29–28, 29–28)	3	5:00
Preliminary Card (UFC Fight Pass)
Lightweight	Joe Lauzon	def.	Diego Sanchez	TKO (punches)	1	1:26
Middleweight	Gegard Mousasi	def.	Thiago Santos	KO (punches)	1	4:32
Lightweight	Jim Miller	def.	Takanori Gomi	TKO (punches)	1	2:18

== Bonus awards ==
The following fighters were awarded $50,000 bonuses:

- Fight of the Night: Not awarded
- Performance of the Night: Amanda Nunes, Cain Velasquez, Joe Lauzon and Gegard Mousasi

== Reported payout ==
The following is the reported payout to the fighters as reported to the Nevada State Athletic Commission. It does not include sponsor money and also does not include the UFC's traditional "fight night" bonuses.

- Amanda Nunes: $100,000 (no win bonus) def. Miesha Tate: $500,000
- Brock Lesnar: $2,500,000 (no win bonus) vs. Mark Hunt: $700,000
- Daniel Cormier: $500,000 (no win bonus) def. Anderson Silva: $600,000
- José Aldo: $500,000 (includes $100,000 win bonus) def. Frankie Edgar: $190,000
- Cain Velasquez: $300,000 (no win bonus) def. Travis Browne: $120,000
- Julianna Peña: $64,000 (includes $32,000 win bonus) def. Cat Zingano: $35,000
- Kelvin Gastelum: $86,000 (includes $33,000 win bonus) def. Johny Hendricks: $80,000 ^
- T.J. Dillashaw: $50,000 (includes $25,000 win bonus) def. Raphael Assunção: $42,000
- Sage Northcutt: $100,000 (includes $50,000 win bonus) def. Enrique Marín: $13,000
- Joe Lauzon: $108,000 (includes $54,000 win bonus) def. Diego Sanchez: $80,000
- Gegard Mousasi: $110,000 (includes $35,000 win bonus) def. Thiago Santos: $28,000
- Jim Miller: $118,000 (includes $59,000 win bonus) def. Takanori Gomi: $55,000

^ Johny Hendricks was fined 20 percent of his purse ($20,000) for failing to make the required weight for his fight with Kelvin Gastelum. That money was issued to Gastelum, an NSAC official confirmed.

== Records set ==
The event had a $10,700,000 gate, which broke the record for a mixed martial arts event in the United States. The final attendance was 18,202, a record for Nevada, which had hosted 104 prior UFC events. The total disclosed payout for the event reached nearly $7 million at $6,979,000, believed to be the highest combined disclosed payday in UFC history. Lesnar's fight purse was also the highest, breaking Conor McGregor's record from UFC 196 by $1.5 million.

== Collaboration with Mike Judge ==
On September 15, 2010, Yahoo Sports reported that UFC president Dana White was hanging out with Beavis and Butt-Head creator, Mike Judge, of which they wrote "White says the UFC and Judge will be working together". In a rare collaboration, Judge who is a huge fan of the UFC worked on a special project for UFC 200 creating an animated short to promote the event, which also featured Hank Hill from King of the Hill, another one of Judge's shows.

== Aftermath ==
On July 15, it was announced that USADA informed Lesnar of a potential Anti-Doping Policy violation stemming from an out-of-competition sample collection on June 28 from the WADA-accredited UCLA Olympic Analytical Laboratory on the evening of July 14. Four days later, USADA announced another failed test: this time in-competition. It was the same substance, which was not disclosed. On July 23, reports came that Lesnar tested positive for hydroxy-clomiphene, which was revealed days earlier as one of the substances responsible for fellow UFC competitor Jon Jones' test failure. Lesnar was eventually suspended by the NSAC on December 15 for a period of one year, retroactive to the date of the event and his win was overturned to a no contest. He was also fined 10% of his purse. In early January 2017, USADA also suspended Lesnar for the same period, but this time retroactive to the moment he was provisionally suspended.

On July 18, the NSAC confirmed the substances for which Jones tested positive: hydroxy-clomiphene, an anti-estrogenic agent and letrozole metabolite, an aromatase inhibitor. A temporary suspension placed on Jones' Nevada fight license was subsequently extended by a unanimous vote, while a formal hearing was expected for September or October.

On November 7, USADA announced that Jones was suspended for a period of one year retroactive to the July 6 date on which he was provisionally suspended. Two days later, the UFC announced that Jones was stripped of the interim title. The NSAC also suspended Jones for the same period as USADA.

== See also ==
- List of UFC events
- 2016 in UFC
