= Jared Downing =

American mixed martial arts fighter

- Born: July 12, 1989 (age 37); Cedar Rapids, Iowa, United States
- Other names: Demon Eyes
- Nationality: American
- Height: 5 ft 6 in (1.68 m)
- Weight: 170 lb (77 kg; 12 st)
- Division: Welterweight; Lightweight; Featherweight; Bantamweight
- Reach: 67.0 in (170 cm)
- Fighting out of: Cedar Rapids, Iowa, United States
- Team: Hard Drive MMA
- Years active: 2009-2019

Mixed martial arts record
- Total: 15
- Wins: 10
- By knockout: 1
- By submission: 2
- By decision: 7
- Losses: 5
- By knockout: 1
- By submission: 1
- By decision: 3

Other information
- Mixed martial arts record from Sherdog

Jared Downing (born July 12, 1989) is an American mixed martial artist. A professional since 2009, he has fought in Bellator, Shark Fights, and the Resurrection Fighting Alliance.

== Mixed martial arts career ==
=== Early career ===
Downing started his professional career in 2009. Until October 2011, he fought for many promotions throughout the United States, most notably Bellator and Shark Fights.

For Bellator, he faced Chad Vandenberg and Danny Tims. Downing defeated Vandenberg via submission in the third round, and defeated Tims via split decision (30-27 Downing, 29-28 Tims, 30-27 Downing).

For Shark Fights, he faced Ran Weathers and Roberto Vargas. Downing defeated Weathers by knockout early in the first round, but against Vargas, he had his first defeat via split decision (30-27 Vargas, 30-27 Vargas, 30-27 Downing).

=== Resurrection Fighting Alliance ===
Downing fought in the first two events of Resurrection Fighting Alliance. He defeated Eric Marriott at RFA 1: Elliott vs. Pulver and Alessandro Ferreira at RFA 2: Yvel vs. Alexander, both via unanimous decision.

Downing faced Jordan Rinaldi on November 30, 2012, at RFA 5: Downing vs. Rinaldi. He defeated Rinaldi in a five-round bout via unanimous decision to become the promotion's first-ever featherweight champion.

Downing faced Lance Palmer on June 21, 2013, at RFA 8: Pettis vs. Pegg in his first title defense. Downing lost his title via split decision after five rounds (48-46 Downing, 48-46 Palmer, 48-46 Palmer).

=== Second Bellator run ===
After some years away from the promotion, Downing was called to replace an injured Rob Emerson against Patricio Freire on July 31, 2013, at Bellator 97. He was defeated via TKO in the second round.

Downing faced The Ultimate Fighter 5 competitor Rob Emerson on October 18, 2013, at Bellator 104. He lost via submission early in the first round.

== Championships and accomplishments ==
=== Mixed martial arts ===
- Resurrection Fighting Alliance
  - RFA Featherweight Championship (One time; inaugural)

== Mixed martial arts record ==
Professional record breakdown
16 matches	10 wins	6 losses
By knockout	1	1
By submission	2	1
By decision	7	4

Res.	Record	Opponent	Method	Event	Date	Round	Time	Location	Notes
Win	10–6	Jay Ellis	Submission (guillotine choke)	Elite Fight League 4	April 13, 2019	1	2:18	Cedar Rapids, Iowa, United States	Welterweight debut.
Loss	9–6	Eric Wisely	Decision (split)	PC MMA: Pinnacle Combat 19	March 13, 2015	3	5:00	Cedar Rapids, Iowa, United States	For the Pinnacle Combat Lightweight Championship.
Loss	9–5	Martin Brown	Decision (unanimous)	Bellator 117	April 18, 2014	3	5:00	Council Bluffs, Iowa, United States	Lightweight debut.
Loss	9–4	Rob Emerson	Submission (inverted heel hook)	Bellator 104	October 18, 2013	1	1:44	Cedar Rapids, Iowa, United States	148 lb Catchweight bout; Downing missed weight.
Loss	9–3	Patricio Freire	TKO (punches)	Bellator 97	July 31, 2013	2	0:54	Rio Rancho, New Mexico, United States	
Loss	9–2	Lance Palmer	Decision (split)	Resurrection Fighting Alliance 8: Pettis vs. Pegg	June 21, 2013	5	5:00	Milwaukee, Wisconsin, United States	Lost the Resurrection Fighting Alliance Featherweight Championship.
Win	9–1	Jordan Rinaldi	Decision (unanimous)	Resurrection Fighting Alliance 5: Downing vs. Rinaldi	November 30, 2012	5	5:00	Kearney, Nebraska, United States	Won the Resurrection Fighting Alliance Featherweight Championship.
Win	8–1	Alessandro Ferreira	Decision (unanimous)	Resurrection Fighting Alliance 2: Yvel vs. Alexander	March 30, 2012	3	5:00	Kearney, Nebraska, United States	
Win	7–1	Eric Marriott	Decision (unanimous)	Resurrection Fighting Alliance 1: Elliott vs. Pulver	December 16, 2011	3	5:00	Kearney, Nebraska, United States	150 lb Catchweight bout.
Loss	6–1	Roberto Vargas	Decision (split)	Shark Fights 20	October 15, 2011	3	5:00	Laughlin, Nevada, United States	
Win	6–0	Ran Weathers	KO (punches)	Shark Fights 16: Neer vs. Juarez	June 25, 2011	1	1:38	Odessa, Texas, United States	Featherweight debut.
Win	5–0	Danny Tims	Decision (split)	Bellator 32	October 14, 2010	3	5:00	Kansas City, Missouri, United States	
Win	4–0	William Joplin	Decision (unanimous)	CFFAC 2: Tribute to America's Heroes	September 11, 2010	3	5:00	Kansas City, Kansas, United States	
Win	3–0	Chad Vandenberg	Submission (rear-naked choke)	Bellator 22	June 17, 2010	3	1:35	Kansas City, Missouri, United States	
Win	2–0	Ramiro Hernandez	Decision (unanimous)	Pinnacle Combat MMA 4	February 27, 2010	3	5:00	Dubuque, Iowa, United States	
Win	1–0	Tim Gorman	Decision (split)	MFDM: Ballroom Brawl 3	November 13, 2009	3	5:00	Des Moines, Iowa, United States	

=== Mixed martial arts amateur record ===
Amateur record breakdown		
3 matches	3 wins	0 losses
By knockout	2	0
By submission	1	0

Res.	Record	Opponent	Method	Event	Date	Round	Time	Location	Notes
Win	3–0	Nick Quangvan	Submission (armbar)	RCC 10: Devil's Fights	October 30, 2009	1	2:12	Iowa City, Iowa, United States	
Win	2–0	R.J. Harrison	TKO (punches)	Glory Fighting Championships 8	October 17, 2009	2	1:37	Des Moines, Iowa, United States	
Win	1–0	Patrick Osborn	TKO (punches)	Glory Fighting Championships 7	June 25, 2009	1	N/A	Des Moines, Iowa, United States	
