= Nate Diaz =

American mixed martial artist (born 1985)

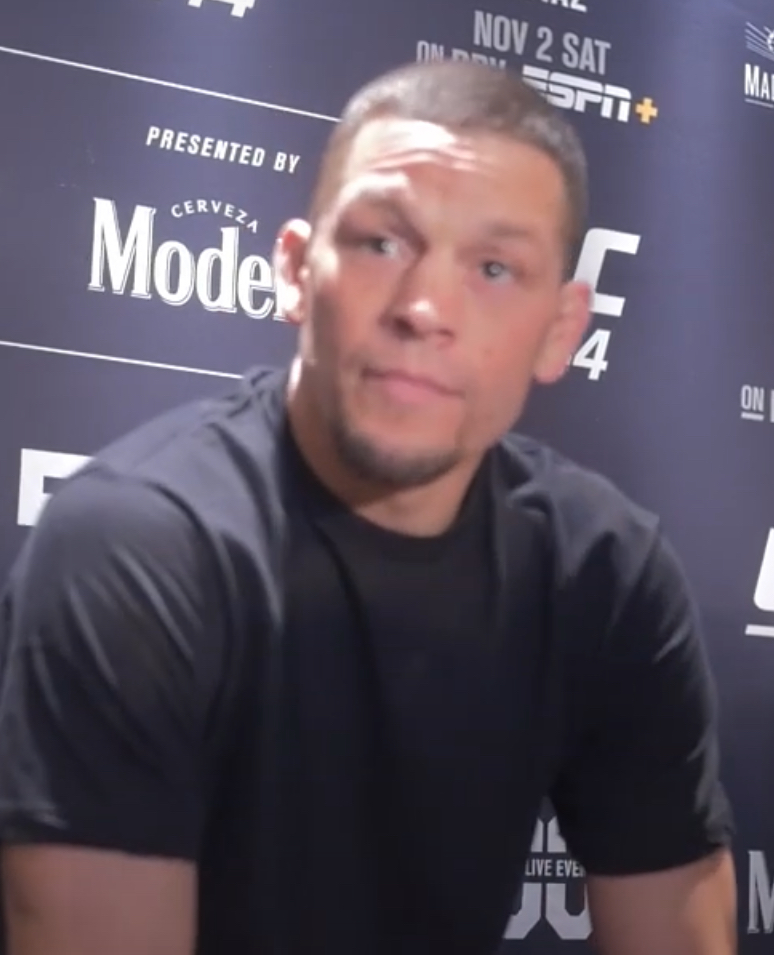
- Diaz in 2019
- Born: Nathan Donald Diaz; April 16, 1985 (age 41); Stockton, California, U.S.
- Height: 6 ft 0 in (183 cm)
- Weight: 170 lb (77 kg; 12 st 2 lb)
- Division: Lightweight (2004–2010, 2011–2015); Welterweight (2010–2011, 2016–present)
- Reach: 76 in (193 cm)
- Stance: Southpaw
- Fighting out of: Stockton, California, U.S.
- Team: Cesar Gracie Jiu-Jitsu
- Trainer: Richard Perez (Boxing); Cesar Gracie (Brazilian Jiu-Jitsu)
- Rank: 3rd degree black belt in Brazilian Jiu-Jitsu under Cesar Gracie
- Years active: 2004–present

Professional boxing record
- Total: 2
- Wins: 1
- Losses: 1

Mixed martial arts record
- Total: 35
- Wins: 21
- By knockout: 5
- By submission: 12
- By decision: 4
- Losses: 14
- By knockout: 3
- By submission: 1
- By decision: 10

Other information
- Children: 1
- Notable relatives: Nick Diaz (brother)
- Mixed martial arts record from Sherdog

Nathan Donald Diaz (born April 16, 1985) is an American mixed martial artist and professional boxer. He is best known for his time spent fighting in the Ultimate Fighting Championship (UFC), where he fought for over 15 years after winning The Ultimate Fighter 5. Prior to signing with the UFC, Diaz competed in World Extreme Cagefighting, Strikeforce, and Pancrase. Diaz has the third most UFC bonus awards, with 16 in total. In 2012, he challenged for the UFC Lightweight Championship.

== Background ==
The son of Melissa (née Womble) and Robert Diaz, he was born of Mexican and Anglo heritage and raised in Stockton, California, with his brother Nick and sister Nina. He grew up in Lodi, California and attended Tokay High School. At the age of 11, he began training in martial arts with his brother, Nick.

== Mixed martial arts career ==
=== Early career ===
Prior to his official MMA career, Diaz competed in a bare knuckle MMA fight against Robert Limon on July 20, 2002, at the age of 17. Footage has since emerged of the fight and it is believed to be his first competitive experience.

Upon making his official professional MMA debut, Diaz competed mainly for World Extreme Cagefighting (WEC). In 2006, at WEC 24, he fought for the WEC Lightweight Championship against then-champion Hermes França, losing by submission in the second round. This was the last event held by WEC before it was acquired by Zuffa, LLC, then parent company of the UFC.

=== Ultimate Fighting Championship ===
==== The Ultimate Fighter 5 ====
Diaz was a contestant on The Ultimate Fighter 5, which exclusively featured lightweights, fighting on Jens Pulver's team. In the preliminary round, Diaz defeated Rob Emerson by submission; in the quarterfinals he defeated fellow Team Pulver teammate Corey Hill via triangle choke submission in the first round. In the semifinals, Diaz defeated Team Penn member Gray Maynard by submission, advancing to the finals, in which he faced teammate Manvel Gamburyan. Diaz won by submission after Gamburyan was forced to tap out in the second round due to the dislocation of his right shoulder as the result of attempting a takedown. With the victory, Diaz won The Ultimate Fighter 5. This fight also earned him a $50,000 Knockout of the Night award.

==== 2008 ====
Diaz faced Alvin Robinson at UFC Fight Night 12 on January 23, 2008. This fight earned him a $40,000 Submission of the Night award.

After defeating Alvin Robinson and Junior Assunção via submission, Diaz demanded tougher opponents. He was given a match with Kurt Pellegrino at UFC Fight Night 13. Diaz defeated Pellegrino via triangle-choke submission in the second round. As he locked up the choke, Diaz had time to flex for the crowd and throw up double middle fingers before Pellegrino submitted. This fight earned him a $20,000 Fight of the Night award. Diaz then defeated veteran Josh Neer by split decision in the main event of UFC Fight Night 15. This fight earned him a $30,000 Fight of the Night award.

==== 2009 ====
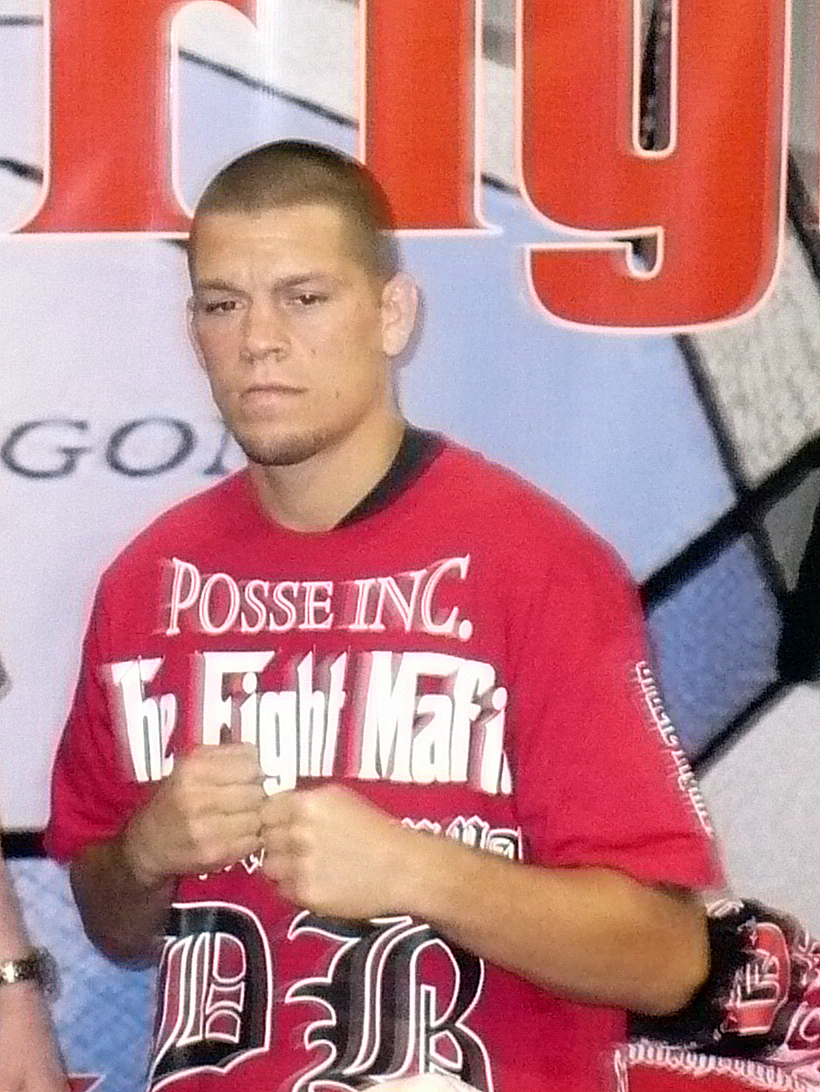
Diaz in 2009.

Diaz next fought former Strikeforce Lightweight Champion Clay Guida at UFC 94: St. Pierre vs. Penn 2, losing via split decision. Guida used his wrestling to take Diaz down multiple times. Guida won via split decision, marking Diaz's first loss in the UFC, in what was also his pay per view debut. This fight earned him a $65,000 Fight of the Night award.

Diaz met fellow Ultimate Fighter winner and former King of the Cage Welterweight Champion Joe Stevenson at The Ultimate Fighter 9 Finale. Stevenson took Diaz down at will throughout the 3 rounds and Diaz lost by unanimous decision. This fight earned him a $25,000 Fight of the Night award.

After two consecutive losses by decision, Diaz headlined UFC Fight Night 19 opposite Melvin Guillard. Diaz won by submission to a guillotine choke at 2:30 of round 2. This fight earned him a $30,000 Fight of the Night award.

==== 2010 ====
Diaz faced Gray Maynard on January 11, 2010, in the main event at UFC Fight Night 20, a rematch from when the two met in the semi-finals of the TUF 5 lightweight tournament, which Diaz won. Diaz lost a controversial split decision to Maynard, as the former TUF winner was given the nod in the FightMetric reports, winning rounds two and three.

After three losses in four fights, Nate considered making a permanent move up in weight to the 170 lb. weight class, stating "I don't make enough money to have to drop this much weight so I'd like to fight at 170 and only go to 155 every once in a while."

Diaz made his Welterweight debut on March 27, 2010, at UFC 111 against Miletich Fighting Systems product and striking specialist Rory Markham. At the weigh-ins, Markham weighed in at 177, whereas Diaz weighed in at the Welterweight limit of 171; the fight was changed to a catchweight fight. Diaz went on to win the fight by TKO in the first round.

After the win over Markham, Diaz stated he would compete in both weight classes. His next fight was again at Welterweight against former professional boxer Marcus Davis on August 28, 2010, at UFC 118. Diaz finished Davis after choking him unconscious with a guillotine choke submission in the final round; the bout earned them $60,000 Fight of the Night honors.

==== 2011 ====
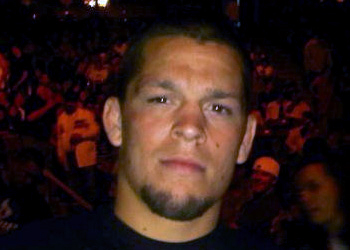
Diaz at UFC Live: Hardy vs. Lytle in 2011

Diaz next faced South Korean fighter Dong Hyun Kim, on January 1, 2011, at UFC 125. Diaz lost the fight via unanimous decision.

Diaz fought Rory MacDonald on April 30, 2011, at UFC 129. Diaz was unable to mount much significant offense and lost via unanimous decision. Following the loss, Diaz stated that he would be moving back down to the lightweight division.

Diaz defeated former PRIDE Lightweight Champion Takanori Gomi on September 24, 2011, at UFC 135 via armbar submission in the first round. He earned a $75,000 Submission of the Night award for his performance.

Diaz defeated Donald Cerrone at UFC 141 via unanimous decision (30–27, 30–27, and 29–28) in a performance that earned both participants $75,000 Fight of the Night honors. Despite being knocked off of his feet multiple times by sweeping leg kicks from Cerrone, Diaz had one of the best performances of his career. Diaz set a CompuStrike record, landing 82% of the strikes he threw en route to his victory over Cerrone.

==== 2012 ====
Diaz, after several years of training, finally received his Brazilian jiu-jitsu black belt from Cesar Gracie. He was awarded his black belt a month before his fight with fellow Brazilian jiu-jitsu black belt Jim Miller.

Diaz next faced Jim Miller on May 5, 2012, at UFC on Fox 3. Diaz outboxed Miller for the majority of the first two rounds, even dropping Miller with a straight left at the end of the first round. Near the end of round two, Miller shot in for a takedown, to which Diaz stuffed and countered with a rolling guillotine choke, forcing the tap at 4:09 of the second round. The submission won Diaz his fifth Submission of the Night bonus award valued at $65,000. It was also the first time Miller had been stopped in his MMA career.

Diaz faced Benson Henderson on December 8, 2012, at UFC on Fox 5 in the main event for the UFC Lightweight Championship. Diaz lost the one-sided bout via unanimous decision. Three weeks prior to the championship bout, Diaz signed an eight-fight contract with UFC.

==== 2013 ====
Diaz faced former Strikeforce Lightweight Champion Josh Thomson on April 20, 2013, at UFC on Fox 7. He lost the fight via TKO due to a head kick and punches, during which Nate's brother, Nick Diaz physically threw a towel into the octagon, in an attempt to signal the referee to end the bout. On May 16, 2013, Diaz was suspended by the UFC for violating the UFC's code of conduct by using a homophobic slur on his Twitter page. The UFC expressed their disappointment and suspended him; he was eventually suspended for 90 days and fined $20,000.

A rubber match with Gray Maynard took place on November 30, 2013, in the main event at The Ultimate Fighter 18 Finale. Diaz won via TKO in the first round. The stoppage earned him his first Knockout of the Night bonus.

==== 2014 ====
On May 5, 2014, both Nate Diaz and fellow UFC fighter T. J. Grant were removed from the UFC's lightweight rankings after being deemed inactive by the UFC.

After over a year away from the sport, Diaz returned from his self-imposed hiatus and faced Rafael Dos Anjos on December 13, 2014, at UFC on Fox 13. Diaz missed weight, coming in at 160.6 pounds. He was given additional time to make the lightweight limit, and cut down to 155.2. However, he was still fined 20 percent of his purse, which went to Rafael dos Anjos. Diaz, who seemed unmotivated and annoyed for most of the fight, lost the one-sided fight via unanimous decision (30–26, 30–26, and 30–27).

==== 2015 ====
Diaz was briefly linked to a welterweight bout with Matt Brown on July 11, 2015, at UFC 189. However, in mid-April, Brown announced that the pairing had been scrapped.

After sitting out again for over a year, Diaz returned to face Michael Johnson on December 19, 2015, at UFC on Fox 17. He won the fight via unanimous decision and went on to give one of the most infamous post-fight interviews in UFC history, where he called out Conor McGregor by saying "you're taking everything I work for, motherfucker, and I'm a fight your fucking ass" on live broadcast television. Both participants were awarded $50,000 Fight of the Night honors.

==== 2016 ====
Diaz was set as a replacement to face Conor McGregor on March 5, 2016, at UFC 196, filling in for an injured Rafael dos Anjos. With Diaz only having eleven days notice, the fight took place at welterweight (170 lbs) due to lack of time to cut weight. Diaz won the fight via submission in the second round. This gave Diaz his ninth submission victory in the UFC, tied for the second-most all-time behind only Royce Gracie. Both fighters were awarded Fight of the Night honors and Diaz was also awarded with the Performance of the Night bonus which totalled $100,000 overall.

A rematch with McGregor was scheduled for July 9, 2016, at UFC 200. However, on April 19, the UFC announced that McGregor had been pulled from the event after failing to fulfill media obligations in Las Vegas related to the fight. In turn, the fight with McGregor was rescheduled and took place the following month, contested again at welterweight, at UFC 202. Diaz lost the rematch via majority decision. The contest was once again awarded Fight of the Night honors.

At the UFC 202 post-fight press conference, Diaz violated the USADA rule by smoking CBD, Cannabidiol, vape pen within four hours after a fight. He was not sanctioned as CBD is not considered a PED. USADA changed their rules and lifted CBD from the banned list not long after.

==== 2018 ====
After a two-year-long layoff, it was announced on August 3, 2018, that Diaz was expected to return on November 3 against Dustin Poirier in a lightweight bout. This bout was expected to serve as the co-headliner of UFC 230. However, on October 9, 2018, it was announced that Poirier pulled out due to injury and as a result, the bout was canceled.

==== 2019 ====
Nate Diaz returned to competition on August 17 at UFC 241. He faced Anthony Pettis in a welterweight bout which served as the co-main event. With a dominant performance, he won the fight by unanimous decision.

Diaz faced Jorge Masvidal on November 2, 2019, in the main event of UFC 244. In a unique situation, UFC President Dana White confirmed that the headlining bout was for a celebratory "baddest motherfucker" ('BMF') belt. After being dominated for most of the fight, Diaz lost the fight via TKO between rounds three and four when the cage-side physician determined a cut over Diaz's right eye rendered him unable to continue.

==== 2021 ====
Diaz was expected to face Leon Edwards on May 15, 2021, at UFC 262 in the event's co-headliner, marking the first time a non-main event and non-title bout had been scheduled for 5 rounds. However, the bout was moved to UFC 263 due to a minor injury sustained by Diaz and eventually took place for five rounds as well. Edwards controlled a vast majority of the bout, but was stunned badly with punches late in the fifth. Edwards won the fight by unanimous decision (49–46, 49–46, 49–46).

==== 2022 ====
On the last fight of his UFC contract, Diaz was scheduled to face Khamzat Chimaev on September 10, 2022, in the main event of UFC 279. However, at the weigh-ins on September 9, Chimaev weighed in at 178.5 pounds, seven-and-a-half pounds over the welterweight non-title fight limit. As a result of Chimaev missing weight, he was removed from his bout with Diaz. Diaz instead faced Tony Ferguson in the main event. Diaz won the fight via a guillotine choke submission in the fourth round. This win earned Diaz his second Performance of the Night bonus award. Diaz opted to not re-sign with the UFC before the bout with Ferguson, thus making Diaz a free agent once the fight concluded.

=== Return ===
==== 2026 ====
On March 16, 2026, it was announced that Diaz would make his return to MMA after a four-year hiatus under Most Valuable Promotions at MVP MMA 1, against Mike Perry on May 16, 2026, at the Intuit Dome in Inglewood, California. Diaz lost the fight by technical knockout via corner stoppage at the end of the second round.

== Boxing career ==
=== Diaz vs. Paul ===
After becoming a free agent, Diaz decided to enter into the sport of boxing. On April 12, 2023, it was announced that Diaz would be making his professional boxing debut against Jake Paul. The bout took place on August 5, 2023, at the American Airlines Center in Dallas, Texas. Paul defeated Diaz via unanimous decision with scores of 98–91, 98–91, and 97–92.

=== Diaz vs. Masvidal ===
On March 13, 2024, it was announced that Diaz would face Jorge Masvidal on June 1, 2024, at the Kia Forum in Los Angeles, California in a 10-round bout at light heavyweight. On May 7, 2024, it was reported that the fight was rescheduled for July 6, 2024 at Honda Center in Anaheim, CA. On May 13, 2024, the new event date was confirmed for July 6, 2024. Diaz won the bout by majority decision.

After the boxing match with Jorge Masvidal, Diaz launched a lawsuit against Fanmio and its owner, Solomon Engel for fraud and breach of contract; alleging that he was only paid $1 million out of the total $10 million purse he was promised.

== Personal life ==
Diaz's older brother Nick is also a professional MMA fighter. Both Diaz brothers are advocates for cannabis and even have a licensed line of marijuana pre-rolls made by California Finest. They currently run a Brazilian jiu-jitsu school in Stockton, California (Nick Diaz Academy), and founded a CBD company called Game Up Nutrition. He has been primarily vegan since he was 18 years old, but admits to eating fish from time to time. On June 20, 2018, it was announced that Diaz's girlfriend had given birth to their daughter.

In August 2022, Diaz publicly endorsed fellow UFC veteran BJ Penn in his run for governor for Hawaii.

In September 2022, Diaz announced the news that he was starting his own combat sports promotion company, Real Fight Inc. Diaz remained connected to his roots, often giving back to his community in Stockton being involved with support for young fighters as he nurtures a new generation of talent. As a result of the attention that Diaz had brought to the city of Stockton, he was presented with a key to the city by the mayor during a Stockton Kings basketball game in December 2022.

In October 2022, Diaz was involved in a brawl backstage at the Jake Paul vs. Anderson Silva boxing match and was removed from the event as a result.

In April 2023, footage emerged of Diaz getting involved in an altercation in the street that ended with him choking a man unconscious. Diaz was then issued a warrant and Diaz turned himself in to the New Orleans Police Department on April 27, at 7:10 AM, facing a second-degree battery charge. Diaz's attorney claimed that he acted in self-defense and he was released on a $10,000 bond. On September 25, 2023, it was reported that the Orleans Parish would not pursue the case against Diaz indicating his actions were entirely in self defense as shown on video, clear in pictures and clear from the multiple witnesses.

Diaz was involved in an alleged altercation with a security guard by pushing him in the face with "an open hand" on August 24, 2024 at Omnia nightclub at Caesars Palace while holding up the line. A misdemeanor battery charge was filed against Diaz in October. He could face up to six months in jail and a $1,000 fine if convicted.

== Championships and accomplishments ==
- Ultimate Fighting Championship
  - The Ultimate Fighter 5 winner
  - Fight of the Night (Eight times) vs. Josh Neer, Clay Guida, Joe Stevenson, Marcus Davis, Donald Cerrone, Michael Johnson, & Conor McGregor (x2)
    - Tied (Frankie Edgar & Cub Swanson) for fourth most Fight of the Night bonuses in UFC history (8)
  - Knockout of the Night (One time) vs. Gray Maynard 2
  - Performance of the Night (Two times) vs. Conor McGregor 1 and Tony Ferguson
  - Submission of the Night (Five times) Alvin Robinson, Kurt Pellegrino, Melvin Guillard, Takanori Gomi, & Jim Miller
    - Tied (Jim Miller) for fourth most Post-Fight bonuses in UFC history (16)
  - Tied (Jim Miller) for most guillotine-choke submissions in UFC history (5)
  - Tied (Joe Lauzon) for the fourth most submission wins in UFC Lightweight division history (7)
  - Tied (Royce Gracie) for fifth most submissions in UFC history (10)
  - Fifth most total strikes landed in UFC history (2487)
  - Tied (Nik Lentz) for fourth most submission attempts in UFC history (26)
  - Second most significant strikes landed in a 3-round UFC bout (238) (vs. Donald Cerrone)
  - UFC.com Awards
    - 2008: Ranked #9 Fighter of the Year, Ranked #7 Submission of the Year vs. Kurt Pellegrino, Ranked #7 Fight of the Year vs. Kurt Pellegrino & Ranked #8 Fight of the Year vs. Josh Neer
    - 2011: Ranked #5 Submission of the Year vs. Takanori Gomi & Ranked #6 Fight of the Year vs. Donald Cerrone
    - 2012: Ranked #4 Submission of the Year vs. Jim Miller
    - 2016: Ranked #5 Upset of the Year vs. Conor McGregor 1 & Ranked #2 Fight of the Year vs. Conor McGregor 2
- MMA Junkie
  - 2016 #3 Ranked Fight of the Year vs. Conor McGregor 2 at UFC 202
  - 2016 #5 Ranked Fight of the Year vs. Conor McGregor at UFC 196
  - 2016 March Fight of the Month vs. Conor McGregor
  - 2016 August Fight of the Month vs. Conor McGregor
  - 2019 November Fight of the Month vs. Jorge Masvidal
- Sherdog
  - 2011 All-Violence First Team
- World MMA Awards
  - 2016 Submission of the Year vs. Conor McGregor at UFC 196
- Wrestling Observer Newsletter
  - 2016 Feud of the Year vs. Conor McGregor
- Fight Matrix
  - 2019 Comeback Fighter of the Year
- Yahoo Sports
  - 2016 Fight of the Year vs. Conor McGregor 2 at UFC 202
- MMA Fighting
  - 2008 #2 Ranked UFC Submission of the Year vs. Kurt Pellegrino at UFC Fight Night: Florian vs. Lauzon
- CBS Sports
  - 2016 #2 Ranked UFC Fight of the Year vs. Conor McGregor II at UFC 202
  - 2016 #6 Ranked UFC Fight of the Year vs. Conor McGregor at UFC 196
- Sportsnet
  - 2016 UFC Submission of the Year vs. Conor McGregor at UFC 196
- Combat Press
  - 2016 Submission of the Year vs. Conor McGregor at UFC 196

=== State/Local ===
- Key to the City of Stockton: December 3, 2022

== Mixed martial arts record ==
Professional record breakdown
35 matches	21 wins	14 losses
By knockout	5	3
By submission	12	1
By decision	4	10

Res.	Record	Opponent	Method	Event	Date	Round	Time	Location	Notes
Loss	21–14	Mike Perry	TKO (corner stoppage)	MVP MMA: Rousey vs. Carano	May 16, 2026	2	5:00	Inglewood, California, United States	
Win	21–13	Tony Ferguson	Submission (guillotine choke)	UFC 279	September 10, 2022	4	2:52	Las Vegas, Nevada, United States	Performance of the Night.
Loss	20–13	Leon Edwards	Decision (unanimous)	UFC 263	June 12, 2021	5	5:00	Glendale, Arizona, United States	
Loss	20–12	Jorge Masvidal	TKO (doctor stoppage)	UFC 244	November 2, 2019	3	5:00	New York City, New York, United States	For the symbolic UFC "BMF" title.
Win	20–11	Anthony Pettis	Decision (unanimous)	UFC 241	August 17, 2019	3	5:00	Anaheim, California, United States	
Loss	19–11	Conor McGregor	Decision (majority)	UFC 202	August 20, 2016	5	5:00	Las Vegas, Nevada, United States	Fight of the Night.
Win	19–10	Conor McGregor	Submission (rear-naked choke)	UFC 196	March 5, 2016	2	4:12	Las Vegas, Nevada, United States	Return to Welterweight. Performance of the Night. Fight of the Night.
Win	18–10	Michael Johnson	Decision (unanimous)	UFC on Fox: dos Anjos vs. Cowboy 2	December 19, 2015	3	5:00	Orlando, Florida, United States	Fight of the Night.
Loss	17–10	Rafael dos Anjos	Decision (unanimous)	UFC on Fox: dos Santos vs. Miocic	December 13, 2014	3	5:00	Phoenix, Arizona, United States	Catchweight (160.5 lb) bout; Diaz missed weight.
Win	17–9	Gray Maynard	TKO (punches)	The Ultimate Fighter: Team Rousey vs. Team Tate Finale	November 30, 2013	1	2:38	Las Vegas, Nevada, United States	Knockout of the Night.
Loss	16–9	Josh Thomson	TKO (head kick and punches)	UFC on Fox: Henderson vs. Melendez	April 20, 2013	2	3:44	San Jose, California, United States	
Loss	16–8	Benson Henderson	Decision (unanimous)	UFC on Fox: Henderson vs. Diaz	December 8, 2012	5	5:00	Seattle, Washington, United States	For the UFC Lightweight Championship.
Win	16–7	Jim Miller	Submission (guillotine choke)	UFC on Fox: Diaz vs. Miller	May 5, 2012	2	4:09	East Rutherford, New Jersey, United States	Submission of the Night.
Win	15–7	Donald Cerrone	Decision (unanimous)	UFC 141	December 30, 2011	3	5:00	Las Vegas, Nevada, United States	Fight of the Night.
Win	14–7	Takanori Gomi	Submission (armbar)	UFC 135	September 24, 2011	1	4:27	Denver, Colorado, United States	Return to Lightweight. Submission of the Night.
Loss	13–7	Rory MacDonald	Decision (unanimous)	UFC 129	April 30, 2011	3	5:00	Toronto, Ontario, Canada	
Loss	13–6	Dong Hyun Kim	Decision (unanimous)	UFC 125	January 1, 2011	3	5:00	Las Vegas, Nevada, United States	
Win	13–5	Marcus Davis	Technical Submission (guillotine choke)	UFC 118	August 28, 2010	3	4:02	Boston, Massachusetts, United States	Fight of the Night.
Win	12–5	Rory Markham	TKO (punches)	UFC 111	March 27, 2010	1	2:47	Newark, New Jersey, United States	Return to Welterweight; Markham missed weight (177 lb).
Loss	11–5	Gray Maynard	Decision (split)	UFC Fight Night: Maynard vs. Diaz	January 11, 2010	3	5:00	Fairfax, Virginia, United States	
Win	11–4	Melvin Guillard	Submission (guillotine choke)	UFC Fight Night: Diaz vs. Guillard	September 16, 2009	2	2:13	Oklahoma City, Oklahoma, United States	Submission of the Night.
Loss	10–4	Joe Stevenson	Decision (unanimous)	The Ultimate Fighter: United States vs. United Kingdom Finale	June 20, 2009	3	5:00	Las Vegas, Nevada, United States	Fight of the Night.
Loss	10–3	Clay Guida	Decision (split)	UFC 94	January 31, 2009	3	5:00	Las Vegas, Nevada, United States	Fight of the Night.
Win	10–2	Josh Neer	Decision (split)	UFC Fight Night: Diaz vs. Neer	September 17, 2008	3	5:00	Omaha, Nebraska, United States	Fight of the Night.
Win	9–2	Kurt Pellegrino	Submission (triangle choke)	UFC Fight Night: Florian vs. Lauzon	April 2, 2008	2	3:06	Broomfield, Colorado, United States	Submission of the Night.
Win	8–2	Alvin Robinson	Submission (triangle choke)	UFC Fight Night: Swick vs. Burkman	January 23, 2008	1	3:39	Las Vegas, Nevada, United States	Submission of the Night.
Win	7–2	Junior Assunção	Submission (guillotine choke)	UFC Fight Night: Thomas vs. Florian	September 19, 2007	1	4:10	Las Vegas, Nevada, United States	
Win	6–2	Manny Gamburyan	TKO (shoulder injury)	The Ultimate Fighter: Team Pulver vs. Team Penn Finale	June 23, 2007	2	0:20	Las Vegas, Nevada, United States	Won The Ultimate Fighter 5 Lightweight Tournament.
Loss	5–2	Hermes França	Submission (armbar)	WEC 24	October 12, 2006	2	2:46	Lemoore, California, United States	For the WEC Lightweight Championship.
Win	5–1	Dennis Davis	Submission (keylock)	Warrior Cup 1	August 12, 2006	1	2:00	Stockton, California, United States	Won the inaugural WC Lightweight Championship.
Win	4–1	Joe Hurley	Submission (triangle choke)	WEC 21	June 15, 2006	2	2:03	Highland, California, United States	Catchweight (160 lb) bout.
Win	3–1	Gilbert Rael	TKO (punches)	WEC 20	May 5, 2006	1	3:35	Lemoore, California, United States	
Win	2–1	Tony Juares	TKO (punches)	Strikeforce: Shamrock vs. Gracie	March 10, 2006	1	3:23	San Jose, California, United States	Return to Lightweight.
Loss	1–1	Koji Oishi	Decision (unanimous)	Pancrase: 2005 Neo-Blood Tournament Finals	August 27, 2005	3	5:00	Tokyo, Japan	Welterweight debut.
Win	1–0	Alejandro Garcia	Submission (triangle choke)	WEC 12	October 21, 2004	3	2:17	Lemoore, California, United States	Lightweight debut.

Exhibition record breakdown		
3 matches	3 wins	0 losses
By submission	3	0

Res.	Record	Opponent	Method	Event	Date	Round	Time	Location	Notes
Win	3–0	Gray Maynard	Submission (guillotine choke)	The Ultimate Fighter: Team Pulver vs. Team Penn	June 14, 2007 (air date)	2	1:17	Las Vegas, Nevada, United States	The Ultimate Fighter 5 semi-final.
Win	2–0	Corey Hill	Submission (triangle choke)	The Ultimate Fighter: Team Pulver vs. Team Penn	June 7, 2007 (air date)	1	3:02	Las Vegas, Nevada, United States	The Ultimate Fighter 5 quarterfinal.
Win	1–0	Rob Emerson	Submission (rear-naked choke)	The Ultimate Fighter: Team Pulver vs. Team Penn	April 19, 2007 (air date)	2	4:45	Las Vegas, Nevada, United States	The Ultimate Fighter 5 elimination round.

== Professional boxing record ==
2 fights	1 win	1 loss
By decision	1	1

No.	Result	Record	Opponent	Type	Round, time	Date	Location	Notes
2	Win	1–1	Jorge Masvidal	MD	10	Jul 6, 2024	Honda Center, Anaheim, California, U.S.	
1	Loss	0–1	Jake Paul	UD	10	Aug 5, 2023	American Airlines Center, Dallas, Texas, U.S.	

== Pay-per-view bouts ==
=== MMA ===
No.	Event	Fight	Date	Venue	City	PPV buys
1.	UFC 196	McGregor vs. Diaz	March 5, 2016	MGM Grand Garden Arena	Las Vegas, Nevada, U.S.	1,317,000
2.	UFC 202	Diaz vs. McGregor 2	August 20, 2016	T-Mobile Arena	Las Vegas, Nevada, U.S.	1,650,000
3.	UFC 244	Masvidal vs Diaz	November 2, 2019	Madison Square Garden	New York City, New York U.S.	Not Disclosed
4.	UFC 279	Diaz vs Ferguson	September 10, 2022	T-Mobile Arena	Las Vegas, Nevada U.S.	Not Disclosed

=== Boxing ===
No.	Date	Fight	Billing	Buys	Network	Revenue
1	August 5, 2023	Paul vs. Diaz	Ready 4 War	450,000	DAZN / ESPN+	$27,000,000

== See also ==
- List of male boxers
- List of male mixed martial artists
- List of mixed martial artists with professional boxing records
- List of multi-sport athletes
