= Mike Perry (fighter) =

American mixed martial arts fighter (born 1991)

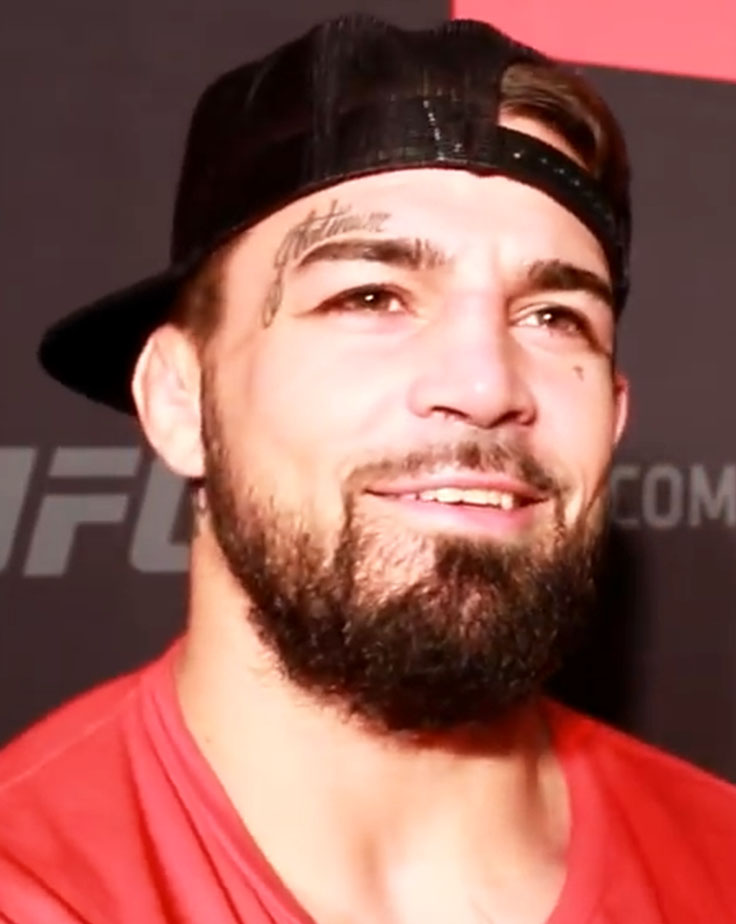
- Mike Perry at UFC 229 in Las Vegas, Nevada in October 2018
- Born: Michael Joseph Perry; September 15, 1991 (age 35); Flint, Michigan, U.S.
- Nickname: Platinum
- Height: 5 ft 10 in (178 cm)
- Weight: 170 lb (77 kg; 12 st 2 lb)
- Division: Middleweight (2022–present); Welterweight (2015–2021); Lightweight (2014–2015)
- Reach: 71 in (180 cm)
- Fighting out of: Orlando, Florida, U.S.
- Team: Jackson-Wink MMA (previously); Fusion X-Cel (2019–2020); MMA Masters (2021–present)
- Rank: Purple belt in Brazilian Jiu-Jitsu under Paul Rodriguez and Julien Williams
- Years active: 2014–present

Professional boxing record
- Total: 2
- Losses: 2
- By knockout: 2

Mixed martial arts record
- Total: 24
- Wins: 15
- By knockout: 12
- By decision: 3
- Losses: 9
- By knockout: 2
- By submission: 1
- By decision: 6

Amateur record
- Total: 11
- Wins: 8
- By knockout: 6
- By decision: 2
- Losses: 3

Other information
- Boxing record from BoxRec
- Mixed martial arts record from Sherdog

Michael Joseph Perry (born September 15, 1991) is an American professional mixed martial artist and bare-knuckle boxer currently competing in the Middleweight division of the Bare Knuckle Fighting Championship (BKFC), where he is the current "King of Violence" champion. Perry also competed in the Ultimate Fighting Championship (UFC) 15 times. As of April 13, 2026, he is #4 in the BKFC middleweight rankings and #5 in the BKFC men's pound-for-pound rankings.

== Background ==
Perry was born in Flint, Michigan, on September 15, 1991. For much of his life, he moved around to different schools between Michigan and Florida. He said, "[In Michigan], I was one of maybe 10 white kids in the whole school, so I was bullied a lot. It was the same thing at other schools. I wouldn’t back down, so I would get into fights." This instability led him to a path of drugs, house arrest, probation violation, and jail. Perry started training boxing at age 11. Upon his release from jail for burglary, he got a job as a trainer at a UFC gym in Winter Springs, Florida. His work as a trainer led to his career as a fighter.

== Mixed martial arts career ==
=== Early career ===
Perry made his professional debut in September 2014, after completing 11 amateur fights with a record of 8–3. He competed for several regional promotions across the United States. In just under two years, he fought nine times while finishing all of his opponents via knockout.

=== Ultimate Fighting Championship ===
==== 2016 ====
Perry made his UFC debut on short notice against Lim Hyun-gyu on August 20, 2016, at UFC 202, after Sultan Aliev pulled out due to injury. At the official weigh-ins, Perry faked a handshake with Lim then put his hands up yelling to Lim, "You thought you had a friend, boy!" before screaming at his opponent. He defeated Lim via TKO in the first round after Perry dropped him twice with right hands, dropped him again with a left hook and then followed up with ground and pound before the referee jumped in to stop the fight.

During the fight against Lim, Perry's cornerman and fellow fighter Alex Nicholson shouted during the pre-fight introductions, "He can't even open his motherfucking eyes." Nicholson was accused of racism for this, as Lim is Korean. Nicholson later addressed the comment on Twitter, saying, "I respect every man who steps in the cage and my comments were insensitive towards Lim I was hype for my brother but It's all love no hate." On the Monday following the fight Perry said on The MMA Hour, "I don't think any of my competition can see me, and when I hit Lim, I opened a lot of people's eyes."

Perry faced Danny Roberts on October 8, 2016, at UFC 204. At the official weigh-ins, Perry took a bite from a bar of chocolate and then told Roberts he was going to eat him alive. He defeated Roberts via KO late in the third round after Perry hurt him with a knee from the clinch, dropped him with a right hand and then followed up with ground and pound before the referee jumped in to stop the fight. The referee Marc Goddard appeared to stop the fight late, issuing an apology after the event via Twitter.

Perry faced Alan Jouban, on December 17, 2016, at UFC on Fox 22. At the official weigh-ins, Perry took a polaroid photo of Jouban and then tried to hand the photo to him as they traded words, but Jouban slapped it away with his hand and Perry aggressively feigned movement towards him while sticking his tongue out. He lost the fight by unanimous decision.

==== 2017 ====
Perry faced Jake Ellenberger on April 22, 2017, at UFC Fight Night 108. He defeated Ellenberger via KO in the second round after Perry dropped him with a left hook early in round two then finished with a standing elbow from the clinch 30 seconds later. Perry was awarded a $50,000 Performance of the Night bonus.

Perry was expected to face Thiago Alves on September 16, 2017, at UFC Fight Night 116. Alves was pulled from the event and was replaced by promotional newcomer Alex Reyes. Perry won the fight via knockout in the first round. The win also earned Perry his second Performance of the Night bonus award.

Perry faced Santiago Ponzinibbio on December 16, 2017, at UFC on Fox: Lawler vs. dos Anjos. He lost the fight by unanimous decision.

==== 2018 ====
Perry faced Max Griffin on February 24, 2018, at UFC on Fox: Emmett vs. Stephens. He lost the fight via unanimous decision.

Perry was expected to face Yancy Medeiros on July 7, 2018, at UFC 226. However, Medeiros pulled out of the fight on June 27, citing a rib injury. The following day, it was announced that Paul Felder would step in to face Perry in a Welterweight bout at the same event. Perry won the fight via split decision.

Perry faced Donald Cerrone on November 10, 2018, at UFC Fight Night 139. Perry lost the fight via submission due to an armbar in round one, marking the first time he had been finished in a professional mixed martial arts contest.

==== 2019 ====
After the fight with Cerrone, Perry signed a new four-fight contract with the UFC and faced Alex Oliveira on April 27, 2019, at UFC Fight Night: Jacaré vs. Hermansson. He won the back-and-forth fight by unanimous decision. The win also earned Perry his first Fight of the Night bonus award.

Perry faced Vicente Luque on August 10, 2019, at UFC on ESPN+ 14. He lost the fight via split decision. This fight earned him the Fight of the Night award. As a result, Perry was expected to be sidelined for the remainder of 2019 after undergoing surgery to correct facial injuries sustained during the Luque fight.

As the first bout of his new four-fight contract, Perry faced Geoff Neal on December 14, 2019, at UFC 245. He lost the bout via first-round technical knockout, marking the first loss in his MMA career by knockout.

==== 2020 ====
Perry faced Mickey Gall on June 27, 2020, at UFC on ESPN: Poirier vs. Hooker. He won the fight via unanimous decision.

Perry was expected to face Robbie Lawler on November 21, 2020, at UFC 255. However, Lawler pulled out of the fight in late October, citing an undisclosed injury. Perry instead faced Tim Means at the same event. At the weigh-ins on November 20, Perry missed weight, weighing in at 175.5 pounds, over the non-title welterweight limit of 171.0 pounds. As a result, the bout proceeded at a catchweight and Perry was fined 30 percent of his purse, which went to Means. Perry lost the fight via unanimous decision.

==== 2021 ====
Mike Perry faced Daniel Rodriguez on April 10, 2021, at UFC on ABC 2. He lost the bout via unanimous decision.

=== Return ===
==== 2026 ====
On March 16, 2026, it was announced that Perry would make his return to MMA after a five-year hiatus under Most Valuable Promotions at MVP MMA 1, against former UFC Lightweight Championship challenger Nate Diaz on May 16, 2026, at the Intuit Dome in Inglewood, California. Perry won the fight by technical knockout via corner stoppage at the end of the second round.

Perry was scheduled to face Dillon Danis on August 29, 2026 at DuelBit's inaugural combat sports event Duel Arena 1, promoted by the online casino Duel. However, 48 hours before the bout, Danis withdrew for undisclosed reasons and was replaced by Brandon Jenkins. After dislocating his shoulder during the fight, Perry lost by technical knockout in the first round.

=== Return to UFC ===
On November 14, 2026, it was announced that Perry had re-signed with the UFC.

== Bare-knuckle boxing ==
On October 26, 2021, it was announced that Mike Perry signed a contract with Bare Knuckle Fighting Championship (BKFC) after his UFC contract expired.

On November 27, 2021, Perry faced boxer Michael Seals in a boxing vs MMA card promoted by Triller that featured other UFC veterans, with fighters wearing MMA gloves instead of traditional boxing gloves. Perry won the fight via split decision.

Perry made his Middleweight debut against Julian Lane at BKFC KnuckleMania 2 on February 19, 2022. After knocking down Lane in round one, Perry won the fight via unanimous decision. This fight earned him the Fight of the Night award.

Perry faced Bellator MMA veteran Michael Page on August 20, 2022, in the main event at BKFC 27. After the first five rounds went to a split draw, Perry won the sixth round to win the fight via majority decision.

Perry faced former UFC Middleweight Champion Luke Rockhold on April 29, 2023, in the main event at BKFC 41 and won by technical knockout when Rockhold retired during the bout.

Perry faced former UFC Lightweight Champion Eddie Alvarez for the symbolic King of Violence Championship on December 2, 2023, at BKFC 56. He won by TKO due to corner stoppage after the second round.

Perry faced former BKFC Middleweight Champion Thiago Alves in the main event of BKFC Knucklemania IV in Los Angeles on April 27, 2024. He won by knockout in the first round.

Perry defended his "King of Violence" title against Jeremy Stephens at BKFC 82 on October 4, 2025, in Newark, NJ. After six knockdowns, Perry successfully defended his King of Violence Championship with a win by technical knockout in the fifth round. This fight earned him another Fight of the Night award.

== Grappling ==
=== Submission Underground ===
On February 23, 2020, Perry faced Al Iaquinta in a grappling contest at Chael Sonnen's Submission Underground 11 event. He won the match via fastest escape time.

== Boxing ==
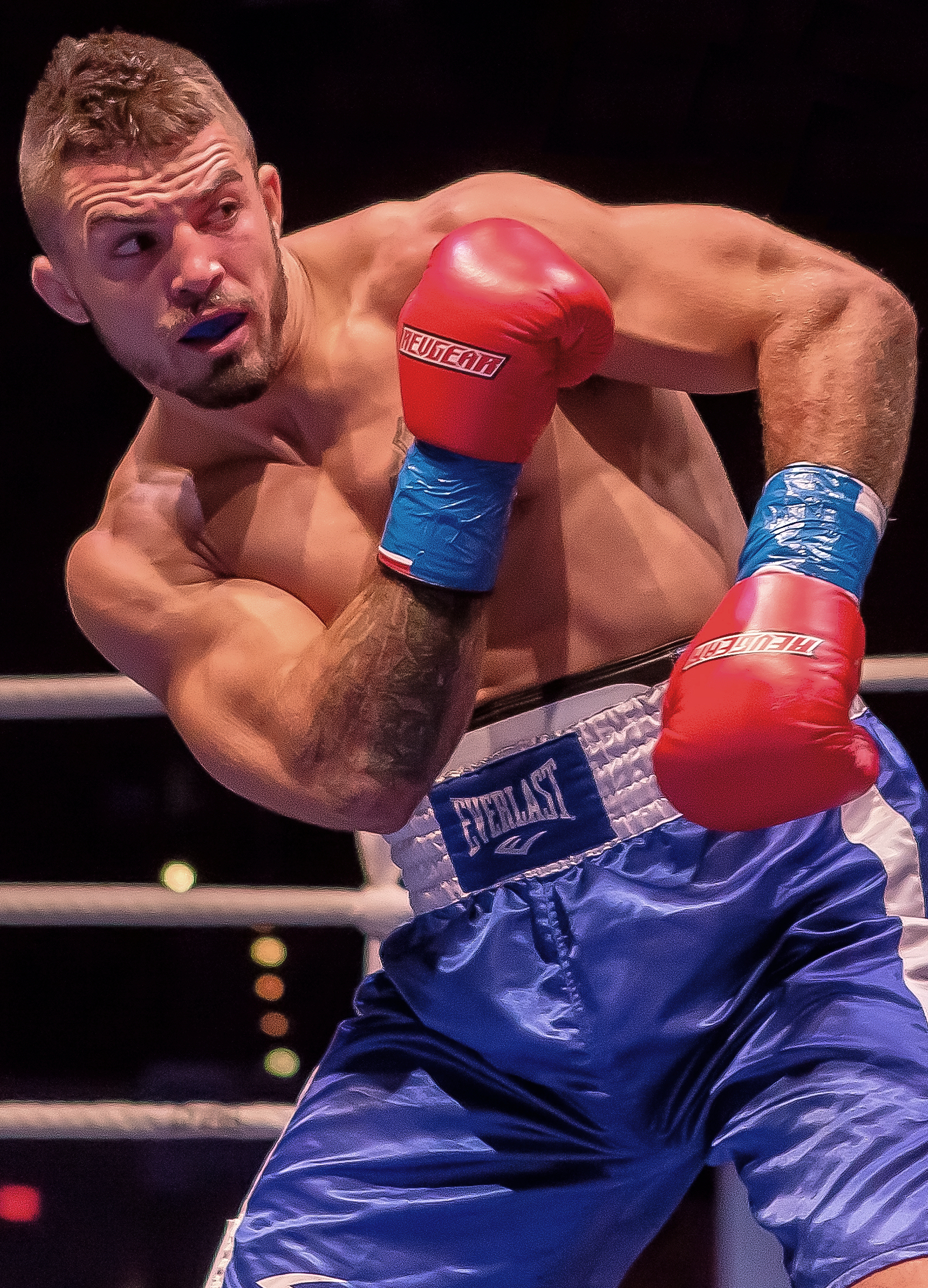
Mike Perry in his boxing debut against Kenneth McNeil at the "Island Fights 33" in Pensacola, Florida in March 2015

On March 28, 2015, Perry fought on his professional boxing debut against Kenneth McNeil. Perry lost the fight via fourth round KO.

On November 27, 2021, Perry faced professional boxer Michael Seals in "Triller Triad Combat", which had MMA fighters box against boxers in a triangular ring, and won the bout by split decision.

Perry was the backup fighter for the Jake Paul vs Tommy Fury February 26, 2023 boxing bout. He was also the backup fighter for the Logan Paul vs Dillon Danis October 14, 2023 boxing bout.

=== Perry vs. Paul ===
It was reported on June 11, 2024 that Perry was scheduled to face Jake Paul in a professional boxing bout on July 20, 2024 after Mike Tyson, the original opponent of Jake Paul, had to postpone the fight. On June 18, 2024 the Jake Paul vs. Mike Perry bout was confirmed for July 20 at Amalie Arena in Tampa, FL. Perry was dropped by Paul three times, losing by technical knockout in the sixth round as the referee waved off the fight.

== Business interests ==
On July 19, 2024, it was announced that Perry launched a boxing organization called "Dirty Boxing Championship", which combines elements of MMA, boxing, and Muay Thai. With five ounce gloves, the organization will feature bouts with three 3-minute rounds for non-championship bouts, weight classes and will take place in an 18-foot ring. The first event was held on November 23, 2024.

== Personal life ==
Perry married professional tennis player Danielle Nickerson in 2019, after five years of dating. They separated in 2020. For his fight against Mickey Gall in June 2020, Perry's corner consisted solely of his girlfriend Latory Gonzalez. On January 6, 2021, Gonzalez gave birth to their first son.

== Controversies ==
=== Self-defense situation in Orlando ===
On New Year's Eve 2016, Perry was involved in an altercation in Orlando, Florida. A stranger allegedly approached Perry's girlfriend and punched Perry after Perry told him to go away, Perry returned a left hook that left the attacker unconscious.

=== Racial slurs ===
Perry has received criticism for his use of racial slurs. In response to complaints by fans and fellow mixed martial artists over his use of the word "nigga", Perry posted a video on social media to state that a DNA test had shown he has 2% African ancestry. Perry issued a public apology for his past use of the N-word and vowed not to use it again, citing his desire to set a better example for his son.

=== Restaurant fights in Texas ===
In July 2020, Perry was questioned by police due to an incident at a restaurant in Lubbock, Texas, where three people were allegedly assaulted. Part of the incident was filmed, showing an elderly man and Perry in a heated dispute. The man lunged towards Perry, and Perry threw a right-hand punch. The man was unconscious when police arrived on the scene and he was hospitalized. Perry was charged with class A assault, a misdemeanor. Perry said his actions were a response to others initiating physical contact with him. During the incident, Perry was also reported to have attacked a restaurant staffer, become involved in a physical altercation with a woman, and repeatedly used the racial slur "nigga."

=== Domestic violence allegations ===
On October 20, 2020, Perry's ex-wife Danielle Nickerson gave an interview to the industry website MMA Junkie in which she described repeated incidents of verbal and physical abuse by Perry. Nickerson claimed that in February 2020, Perry became angry after an altercation with a woman at a bar. Once the couple returned home, Perry took his frustrations out on Nickerson by taking her to the ground and hitting her with a barrage of punches that bruised her face. After the incident Nickerson was picked up by Perry's mother, Sabra Young, and taken to Young's home. When Perry followed Nickerson to the Young residence, Young locked him out of the house and called 911. Nickerson also alleged that during a prior incident, Perry struck her in the forehead while wearing his wedding ring, leaving a hematoma. Nickerson said that the abuse grew so severe that she filed for a restraining order against Perry after the dissolution of their romantic relationship. Perry denies the allegations and no charges were filed.

=== 2024 arrest ===
On October 12, 2024, Perry was arrested in Florida and charged with DUI and refusal to sign a petition to appear in court.

== Championships and accomplishments ==
Mixed Martial Arts

- Ultimate Fighting Championship
  - Performance of the Night (Two times) vs. Jake Ellenberger and Alex Reyes
  - Fight of the Night (Two times) vs. Alex Oliveira and Vicente Luque
  - UFC.com Awards
    - 2016: Ranked #10 Newcomer of the Year
    - 2017: Half-Year Awards: Best Knockout of the 1HY & Ranked #2 Knockout of the Year vs. Jake Ellenberger
- CBS Sports
  - 2017 #2 Ranked UFC Knockout of the Year vs. Jake Ellenberger

=== Bare-knuckle boxing ===
- Bare Knuckle Fighting Championship
  - BKFC King of Violence Championship (First, current)
    - One successful title defense
  - Fight of the Night (Two times) vs. Julian Lane and Jeremy Stephens
  - BKFC 2023 Male Fighter of the Year

== Mixed martial arts record ==
Professional record breakdown
24 matches	15 wins	9 losses
By knockout	12	2
By submission	0	1
By decision	3	6

Res.	Record	Opponent	Method	Event	Date	Round	Time	Location	Notes
Loss	15–9	Brandon Jenkins	TKO (body kick and punches)	Duel Arena 1	August 29, 2026	1	2:38	Orlando, Florida, United States	Catchweight (175 lb) bout.
Win	15–8	Nate Diaz	TKO (corner stoppage)	MVP MMA: Rousey vs. Carano	May 16, 2026	2	5:00	Inglewood, California, United States	
Loss	14–8	Daniel Rodriguez	Decision (unanimous)	UFC on ABC: Vettori vs. Holland	April 10, 2021	3	5:00	Las Vegas, Nevada, United States	
Loss	14–7	Tim Means	Decision (unanimous)	UFC 255	November 21, 2020	3	5:00	Las Vegas, Nevada, United States	Catchweight (175.5 lb) bout; Perry missed weight.
Win	14–6	Mickey Gall	Decision (unanimous)	UFC on ESPN: Poirier vs. Hooker	June 27, 2020	3	5:00	Las Vegas, Nevada, United States	
Loss	13–6	Geoff Neal	TKO (head kick and punches)	UFC 245	December 14, 2019	1	1:30	Las Vegas, Nevada, United States	
Loss	13–5	Vicente Luque	Decision (split)	UFC Fight Night: Shevchenko vs. Carmouche 2	August 10, 2019	3	5:00	Montevideo, Uruguay	Fight of the Night.
Win	13–4	Alex Oliveira	Decision (unanimous)	UFC Fight Night: Jacaré vs. Hermansson	April 27, 2019	3	5:00	Sunrise, Florida, United States	Fight of the Night.
Loss	12–4	Donald Cerrone	Submission (armbar)	UFC Fight Night: The Korean Zombie vs. Rodríguez	November 10, 2018	1	4:46	Denver, Colorado, United States	
Win	12–3	Paul Felder	Decision (split)	UFC 226	July 7, 2018	3	5:00	Las Vegas, Nevada, United States	
Loss	11–3	Max Griffin	Decision (unanimous)	UFC on Fox: Emmett vs. Stephens	February 24, 2018	3	5:00	Orlando, Florida, United States	
Loss	11–2	Santiago Ponzinibbio	Decision (unanimous)	UFC on Fox: Lawler vs. dos Anjos	December 16, 2017	3	5:00	Winnipeg, Manitoba, Canada	
Win	11–1	Alex Reyes	KO (knee)	UFC Fight Night: Rockhold vs. Branch	September 16, 2017	1	1:19	Pittsburgh, Pennsylvania, United States	Performance of the Night.
Win	10–1	Jake Ellenberger	KO (elbow)	UFC Fight Night: Swanson vs. Lobov	April 22, 2017	2	1:05	Nashville, Tennessee, United States	Performance of the Night.
Loss	9–1	Alan Jouban	Decision (unanimous)	UFC on Fox: VanZant vs. Waterson	December 17, 2016	3	5:00	Sacramento, California, United States	
Win	9–0	Danny Roberts	KO (knee and punches)	UFC 204	October 8, 2016	3	4:40	Manchester, England	
Win	8–0	Lim Hyun-gyu	TKO (punches)	UFC 202	August 20, 2016	1	3:38	Las Vegas, Nevada, United States	
Win	7–0	David Mundell	KO (punches)	Battleground: Mundell vs. Perry	May 14, 2016	2	4:10	Kissimmee, Florida, United States	
Win	6–0	Frank Carrillo	KO (punch)	Island Fights 37	March 11, 2016	1	3:40	Pensacola, Florida, United States	
Win	5–0	Jon Manley	TKO (knees and punches)	Premier FC 18	November 14, 2015	2	3:32	Springfield, Massachusetts, United States	
Win	4–0	Micheal Roberts	KO (punches)	BOMAC 2	August 29, 2015	1	5:16	New Providence, Bahamas	Welterweight debut.
Win	3–0	Preston Parsons	TKO (punches)	House of Fame 3	July 10, 2015	1	4:49	Jacksonville, Florida, United States	Catchweight (160 lb) bout.
Win	2–0	James Rodriguez	KO (punches)	Florida CF 1	January 30, 2015	1	2:22	Orlando, Florida, United States	
Win	1–0	Hector Tirado	KO (punches)	Top Alliance Combat 3	September 6, 2014	1	3:52	McDonough, Georgia, United States	Lightweight debut.

== Professional boxing record ==
2 fights	0 wins	2 losses
By knockout	0	2

No.	Result	Record	Opponent	Type	Round, time	Date	Location	Notes
2	Loss	0–2	Jake Paul	TKO	6 (8), 1:12	Jul 20, 2024	Amalie Arena, Tampa, Florida, U.S.	
1	Loss	0–1	Kenneth McNeil	KO	4 (4), 0:52	Mar 28, 2015	Pensacola Bay Center, Pensacola, Florida, U.S.	

== Bare knuckle record ==
Professional record breakdown
6 matches	6 wins	0 losses
By knockout	4	0
By decision	2	0

Res.	Record	Opponent	Method	Event	Date	Round	Time	Location	Notes
Win	6–0	Jeremy Stephens	TKO (punches)	BKFC 82	October 4, 2025	5	1:35	Newark, New Jersey, United States	Return to Middleweight. Defended the symbolic King of Violence Championship. Fight of the Night.
Win	5–0	Thiago Alves	TKO (punches)	BKFC Knucklemania IV	April 27, 2024	1	1:00	Los Angeles, California, United States	Return to Light Heavyweight.
Win	4–0	Eddie Alvarez	TKO (corner stoppage)	BKFC 56	December 2, 2023	2	2:00	Salt Lake City, Utah, United States	Return to Middleweight. Won the symbolic King of Violence Championship.
Win	3–0	Luke Rockhold	TKO (retirement)	BKFC 41	April 29, 2023	2	1:15	Broomfield, Colorado, United States	Light Heavyweight debut.
Win	2–0	Michael Page	Decision (majority)	BKFC 27	August 20, 2022	6	2:00	London, England, United Kingdom	The first five rounds went to a split draw.
Win	1–0	Julian Lane	Decision (unanimous)	BKFC KnuckleMania II	February 19, 2022	5	2:00	Hollywood, Florida, United States	Middleweight debut. Fight of the Night.

== Triad combat record ==
1 fight	1 win	0 losses
By decision	1	0

No.	Result	Record	Opponent	Type	Round, time	Date	Location	Notes
1	Win	1–0	Michael Seals	SD	7	Nov 27, 2021	Globe Life Field, Arlington, Texas, U.S.	

== See also ==
- List of male boxers
- List of male mixed martial artists
- List of mixed martial artists with professional boxing records
- List of multi-sport athletes
