= Rob Emerson =

American mixed martial artist (born 1981)

- Born: Robert Michael Emerson; July 30, 1981 (age 45); Newport Beach, California, U.S.
- Other names: The Saint
- Nationality: American
- Height: 5 ft 8 in (1.73 m)
- Weight: 135 lb (61 kg; 9.6 st)
- Division: Lightweight (2002–2012); Featherweight (2013–present); Bantamweight (2014–present)
- Reach: 71.0 in (180 cm)
- Stance: Orthodox
- Fighting out of: Phoenix, AZ, United States
- Team: The MMA Lab (2016–present); Team Oyama (formerly); Kings MMA; Church Boyz Wrestling
- Rank: Black Belt in Vale Tudo; Brown Belt in Kyokushin Karate; Brown Belt in Kajukenbo
- Years active: 2002–present

Mixed martial arts record
- Total: 37
- Wins: 21
- By knockout: 6
- By submission: 7
- By decision: 8
- Losses: 15
- By submission: 3
- By decision: 12
- No contests: 1

Other information
- Mixed martial arts record from Sherdog

Robert Michael Emerson (born July 30, 1981) is an American professional mixed martial artist. A professional competitor since 2002, Emerson is also a veteran of Bellator MMA, the UFC, Pancrase, and was a cast member of The Ultimate Fighter 5.

== Early life ==
Robert Michael Emerson was born on July 30, 1981, in Huntington Beach, California, and grew up in Dana Point, California. He started training Kyokushin Karate at the age of nine and picked up also Kajukenbo later. Being severely bullied in the school for his Tourettes, Emerson got into lots of fights in his juvenile years. While preparing to embark on a military career, Emerson went to an unsanctioned mixed martial arts show and ended up fighting there, kindling a fire to pursue a career in the sport.

== Mixed martial arts career ==
=== Early career ===
After being released from jail in 2002, Emerson made his professional debut against Jens Pulver at an Ultimate Wrestling event on June 29, 2002. He lost the bout via unanimous decision.

=== The Ultimate Fighter ===
According to Emerson, he bypassed the tryouts as he was invited to participate directly to The Ultimate Fighter 5. On episode three of the season, Emerson faced eventual winner of the show, Nate Diaz. In the second round of an exciting, back-and-forth fight, Diaz managed to secure a rear naked choke for the win. However, B.J. Penn told the viewers that he could not take anything away from Emerson, as he had given the fight his all. After Gabe Ruediger was taken off the show for his inability to make the 155 lb weight limit Dana White brought Emerson back. Corey Hill, Ruediger's initial opponent, picked him to fight.

The first round belonged to Hill as Emerson had problems getting inside and dealing with his substantial reach advantage. In the second round, Emerson was able to take a shot at Hill and get out of range effectively. He even locked in a heel hook when the action hit the mat, earning him the round and forcing the bout to a third and deciding stanza. In the third, both fighters spent most of their time circling each other, and while Emerson appeared to score the most effective blows of the round with kicks to the leg, the decision went to Hill, who put Team Pulver back in the win column and in control heading into episode seven.

=== Ultimate Fighting Championship ===
Emerson faced fellow Team Penn teammate, Gray Maynard, on the undercard of The Ultimate Fighter 5 Finale. Maynard dominated in the first round (the only effective work of Emerson's being a flying knee and a takedown). The second round began with Gray picking up Emerson and slamming him to the canvas. Due to an aggravated injury of the ribs, Emerson submitted. During the fall, however, Maynard accidentally spiked himself on the floor and seemingly rendered himself unconscious. The bout was declared a no-contest.

In his next fight at UFC 81, Emerson won a split decision over Keita Nakamura. Nakamura dropped Emerson with a knee at the end of the first round after Emerson had outstruck him for much of the round. Emerson came back strong in the second round, landing crisp combinations that left Nakamura's face a mess. Nakamura scored takedowns in the third round on a visibly tiring Emerson, but it was not enough to win him the split decision as the scores read (30–27, 28–29, and 30–27) in favor of Emerson.

At UFC 87, Emerson knocked out Manvel Gamburyan in only 12 seconds, earning him "Knockout of the Night" honors.

His next fight at UFC Fight Night: Lauzon vs. Stephens was against Kurt Pellegrino. Emerson lost the fight at 3:14 of the second round due to submission (rear naked choke); the first submission loss of Emerson's professional career.

Emerson was scheduled to fight George Sotiropoulos at UFC 101 but was forced to withdraw because of a hand injury and was replaced by George Roop.

Emerson lost at UFC 103 by decision to Rafael dos Anjos on September 19, 2009. He agreed to the contest after Matt Wiman was forced to withdraw after suffering a knee injury.

Emerson next faced Phillipe Nover on February 6, 2010, at UFC 109 and won a unanimous decision.

Emerson faced Nik Lentz at UFC Fight Night 21. He lost via unanimous decision and was released from his UFC contract.

=== Independent promotions ===
Emerson defeated Rodney Rhoden by TKO in round one at Pure Combat 12.

Emerson faced Eric Reynolds at AOF 10 on December 4, 2010. He won the fight via split decision.

Emerson fought Justin Salas at Full Force Fighting: Vol. 1 on January 29, 2011. Emerson lost to Salas via unanimous decision.

Emerson defeated WEC Veteran Savant Young at Tachi Palace Fighting 12: Second Coming via rear-naked choke submission in round three.

Emerson defeated Jason Williams at FCOC: Fight Club OC via rear naked choke. Following this, he fought at the next Fight Club OC event, defeating Musa Toliver by triangle choke.

=== Bellator MMA ===
Emerson was expected to face Patricio Freire at Bellator 97 on July 31, 2013, when he would make his Featherweight and Bellator Debut. However, on July 12, 2013, it was announced that Emerson would withdraw due to injury and was replaced by Jared Downing.

Emerson eventually would make his Bellator debut against Jared Downing on October 18, 2013, at Bellator 104. He won the fight via heel hook submission in the first round.

Emerson made his Bantamweight debut against Joe Taimanglo on April 11, 2014, at Bellator 116. He won via unanimous decision.

Emerson faced Rafael Silva at Bellator 127 on October 3, 2014. He lost the fight via unanimous decision. Subsequently, California State Athletic Commission suspended Emerson for 18 months after testing positive for prescription drug Modafinil. The suspension was then reduced to five months.

=== Regional circuit ===
After his stint in Bellator, Emerson signed with Victory FC where he became both Bantamweight and Featherweight champion in his first two fights, respectively. He lost his Bantamweight Championship before signing with Russian promotion Absolute Championship Akhmat where he eventually racked a 1–2 record.

Emerson was next scheduled to face Charles Bennett in a bare-knuckle MMA bout at Gamebred FC 2 on September 11, 2021. However, the event would be rescheduled for October 1, 2021. Emerson won by knockout in the first round.

== Bare-knuckle boxing ==
Emerson made his debut with Bare Knuckle Fighting Championship against Mike Medrano on October 17, 2026 at BKFC 95. He lost the fight by split decision.

== Championships and accomplishments ==
- Ultimate Fighting Championship
  - Fight of the Night (One time) vs. Gray Maynard
  - Knockout of the Night (One time) vs. Manny Gamburyan
- Victory Fighting Championship
  - VFC Bantamweight Championship (One time; former)
  - VFC Featherweight Championship (One time; current)

== Mixed martial arts record ==
Professional record breakdown
37 matches	21 wins	15 losses
By knockout	6	0
By submission	7	3
By decision	8	12
No contests	1	

Res.	Record	Opponent	Method	Event	Date	Round	Time	Location	Notes
Win	21–15 (1)	Charles Bennett	KO (punches)	Gamebred FC 2	October 1, 2021	1	4:36	Biloxi, Mississippi, United States	Bare Knuckle MMA.
Loss	20–15 (1)	Dileno Lopes	Submission (Guillotine Choke)	ACA 101: Strus vs. Nemchinov	November 15, 2019	1	3:00	Warsaw, Poland	
Loss	20–14 (1)	Mikhail Malyutin	Decision (unanimous)	ACA 93: Balaev vs Zhamaldaev	March 16, 2019	3	5:00	St. Petersburg, Russia	
Loss	20–13 (1)	Magomedrasul Khasbulaev	Submission (rear-naked choke)	WFCA 54: Dudaev vs. Taimanglo	November 16, 2018	2	1:57	Isa Town, Bahrain	
Win	20–12 (1)	Shamil Shakhbulatov	Decision (unanimous)	ACB 87: Whiteford vs Mousah	May 19, 2018	3	5:00	Nottingham, England	
Loss	19–12 (1)	Raufeon Stots	Decision (unanimous)	VFC 56	April 14, 2017	5	5:00	Omaha, Nebraska, United States	Lost the VFC Bantamweight Championship.
Win	19–11 (1)	Ryan Roberts	TKO (knee injury)	VFC 54	December 9, 2016	1	1:34	Omaha, Nebraska, United States	Won the VFC Featherweight Championship.
Win	18–11 (1)	Shawn West	Submission (rear-naked choke)	VFC 51	June 24, 2016	3	5:00	Urbandale, Iowa, United States	Won the VFC Bantamweight Championship.
Loss	17–11 (1)	Rafael Silva	Decision (unanimous)	Bellator 127	October 3, 2014	3	5:00	Temecula, California, United States	
Win	17–10 (1)	Joe Taimanglo	Decision (unanimous)	Bellator 116	April 11, 2014	3	5:00	Temecula, California, United States	
Win	16–10 (1)	Jared Downing	Submission (inverted heel hook)	Bellator 104	October 18, 2013	1	1:44	Cedar Rapids, Iowa, United States	
Win	15–10 (1)	Musa Toliver	Submission (triangle choke)	FCOC: Fight Club OC	October 4, 2012	1	4:20	Costa Mesa, California, United States	
Win	14–10 (1)	Jason Williams	Submission (rear-naked choke)	FCOC: Fight Club OC	August 16, 2012	1	2:05	Costa Mesa, California, United States	
Win	13–10 (1)	Savant Young	Submission (rear-naked choke)	TPF 12: Second Coming	March 9, 2012	3	4:29	Lemoore, California, United States	
Loss	12–10 (1)	Justin Salas	Decision (unanimous)	Full Force Fighting: Vol. 1	January 30, 2011	3	5:00	Denver, Colorado, United States	For FFF Lightweight Championship.
Win	12–9 (1)	Eric Reynolds	Decision (split)	Art of Fighting 10	December 4, 2010	3	5:00	Estero, Florida, United States	
Win	11–9 (1)	Rodney Rhoden	TKO (punches)	Pure Combat 12: Champions for Children	September 25, 2010	1	3:33	Clovis, California, United States	
Loss	10–9 (1)	Nik Lentz	Decision (unanimous)	UFC Fight Night: Florian vs. Gomi	March 31, 2010	3	5:00	Charlotte, North Carolina, United States	
Win	10–8 (1)	Phillipe Nover	Decision (unanimous)	UFC 109	February 6, 2010	3	5:00	Las Vegas, Nevada, United States	
Loss	9–8 (1)	Rafael dos Anjos	Decision (unanimous)	UFC 103	September 19, 2009	3	5:00	Dallas, Texas, United States	
Loss	9–7 (1)	Kurt Pellegrino	Submission (rear-naked choke)	UFC Fight Night: Lauzon vs. Stephens	February 7, 2009	2	3:14	Tampa, Florida, United States	
Win	9–6 (1)	Manvel Gamburyan	KO (punches)	UFC 87	August 9, 2008	1	0:12	Minneapolis, Minnesota, United States	Knockout of the Night.
Win	8–6 (1)	Keita Nakamura	Decision (split)	UFC 81	February 2, 2008	3	5:00	Las Vegas, Nevada, United States	
NC	7–6 (1)	Gray Maynard	NC (double KO due to slam)	The Ultimate Fighter 5 Finale	June 23, 2007	2	0:39	Las Vegas, Nevada, United States	Fight of the Night.
Win	7–6	Kenji Arai	Decision (unanimous)	Pancrase: Blow 6	August 27, 2006	3	5:00	Yokohama, Japan	
Win	6–6	Takafumi Ito	Decision (unanimous)	Pancrase: Blow 4	May 2, 2006	3	5:00	Tokyo, Japan	
Win	5–6	Jamie Schmidt	TKO (punches)	TC 13: Anarchy	March 11, 2006	2	1:02	Del Mar, California, United States	
Win	4–6	Julian Samaniego	TKO (punches)	KOTC 61: Flash Point	September 23, 2005	1	2:15	San Jacinto, California, United States	
Loss	3–6	Melvin Guillard	Decision (split)	RCF: Cold Hearted	February 19, 2005	3	5:00	Biloxi, Mississippi, United States	
Loss	3–5	Randy Velarde	Decision (majority)	KOTC 44: Revenge	November 14, 2004	2	5:00	San Jacinto, California, United States	
Win	3–4	Joe Camacho	Decision (unanimous)	KOTC 41: Relentless	September 29, 2004	2	5:00	San Jacinto, California, United States	
Win	2–4	Justin Berkley	Submission (arm-triangle choke)	TC 3: Total Combat 3	May 30, 2004	2	N/A	Tijuana, Baja California, Mexico	
Loss	1–4	Dokonjonosuke Mishima	Decision (unanimous)	Deep: 14th Impact	April 18, 2004	3	5:00	Osaka, Japan	
Loss	1–3	Javier Vazquez	Decision (split)	Shooto USA: Warrior Spirit: Evolution	November 14, 2003	3	5:00	Las Vegas, Nevada, United States	
Win	1–2	Chris Brennan	Submission (fatigue)	Hitman Fighting 3	May 2, 2003	N/A	N/A	Santa Ana, California, United States	
Loss	0–2	Jamal Perkins	Decision (unanimous)	KOTC 19: Street Fighter	December 7, 2002	2	5:00	San Jacinto, California, United States	
Loss	0–1	Jens Pulver	Decision (unanimous)	UW: Ultimate Wrestling	June 29, 2002	3	5:00	Minneapolis, Minnesota, United States	

== Bare knuckle boxing record ==
Professional record breakdown
1 match	0 wins	1 loss
By decision	0	1

Res.	Record	Opponent	Method	Event	Date	Round	Time	Location	Notes
Loss	0–1	Mike Medrano	Decision (split)	BKFC 95	October 17, 2026	3	2:00	Newark, New Jersey, United States	

== See also ==
- List of Bellator MMA alumni
