= UFC 196 =

UFC mixed martial arts event in 2016

UFC 196: McGregor vs. Diaz
- The poster for UFC 196: McGregor vs. Diaz
- Promotion: Ultimate Fighting Championship
- Date: March 5, 2016
- Venue: MGM Grand Garden Arena
- City: Las Vegas, Nevada
- Attendance: 14,898
- Total gate: $8,197,628
- Buyrate: 1,317,000

Event chronology
UFC Fight Night: Silva vs. Bisping	UFC 196: McGregor vs. Diaz	UFC Fight Night: Hunt vs. Mir

UFC 196: McGregor vs. Diaz was a mixed martial arts event held on March 5, 2016, at MGM Grand Garden Arena in Las Vegas, Nevada.

== Background ==
The event was officially announced in November 2015 as "UFC 197", taking place on March 5, 2016, at HSBC Arena in Rio de Janeiro, Brazil. Weeks later on December 29, UFC announced that the event was canceled and would be moved to a different location. On January 12, it was confirmed the event would take place at the MGM Grand Garden Arena in Las Vegas, Nevada, United States.

On January 13, UFC revealed this event was originally intended to take place at Arena da Baixada (a much larger venue) in Curitiba, Paraná, Brazil, and feature a UFC Heavyweight Championship rematch between champion Fabrício Werdum and former two-time champion Cain Velasquez, with former UFC Middleweight Champion Anderson Silva in the co-main event slot, possibly against Michael Bisping. Due to a series of injuries, the company moved the heavyweight bout to a separate event scheduled for February 6, which at that time was titled "UFC 196". This change made the March 5 event a smaller draw, which led to the transition to the smaller venue in Rio de Janeiro. To maintain local interest, the company then considered booking the main event as a rematch between two Brazilian fighters, Silva and former UFC Light Heavyweight Champion Vitor Belfort. Belfort declined the bout, as he wished to wait for the result of the middleweight title fight at UFC 194. This final fall-through is what prompted the cancellation of the event in Brazil and relocation to Las Vegas. On January 27, it was revealed the Werdum-Velasquez bout (which had been moved to "UFC 196" scheduled for February 6, 2016) was cancelled entirely. This forced that event to alter into a "UFC Fight Night" card, and the originally scheduled "UFC 197" event was renamed UFC 196.

The event was expected to be headlined by a UFC Lightweight Championship bout between champion Rafael dos Anjos and UFC Featherweight Champion Conor McGregor. This would have been the second time in UFC history that champions in different divisions would fight for the same title. The first time was at UFC 94 on January 31, 2009, when then-UFC Welterweight Champion Georges St-Pierre defended his title against then-lightweight champion B.J. Penn. On February 23, the planned bout suffered a setback as it was announced that dos Anjos pulled out due to a broken foot. Former UFC Featherweight Champion José Aldo declined the initial opportunity to replace him due to "lack of time" to prepare for the bout. Former lightweight champion and top featherweight contender Frankie Edgar also declined the opportunity due to a groin injury. Eventually, The Ultimate Fighter 5 winner and former lightweight title challenger Nate Diaz was announced as the replacement and the bout took place in the welterweight division.

A UFC Women's Bantamweight Championship bout between then champion Holly Holm and former Strikeforce Women's Bantamweight Champion Miesha Tate co-headlined the event.

Michael Johnson was expected to face Tony Ferguson in a lightweight rematch. On January 27, it was announced that Johnson withdrew from the bout due to injury. Ferguson was then rescheduled to fight at UFC on Fox 19 on April 16 against Khabib Nurmagomedov.

A welterweight bout between Brandon Thatch and Siyar Bahadurzada, originally slated for UFC Fight Night: Cowboy vs. Cowboy, was rescheduled to this event due to Thatch's medication being banned by Pennsylvania's athletic commission.

== Results ==
Main Card
Weight class				Method	Round	Time	Notes
Welterweight	Nate Diaz	def.	Conor McGregor	Submission (rear-naked choke)	2	4:09
Women's Bantamweight	Miesha Tate	def.	Holly Holm (c)	Technical Submission (rear-naked choke)	5	3:30	(Note: For the UFC Women's Bantamweight Championship.)
Light Heavyweight	Ilir Latifi	def.	Gian Villante	Decision (unanimous) (30–27, 30–27, 30–27)	3	5:00
Light Heavyweight	Corey Anderson	def.	Tom Lawlor	Decision (unanimous) (30–27, 30–27, 29–28)	3	5:00
Women's Bantamweight	Amanda Nunes	def.	Valentina Shevchenko	Decision (unanimous) (29–28, 29–27, 29–27)	3	5:00
Preliminary Card (Fox Sports 1)
Welterweight	Siyar Bahadurzada	def.	Brandon Thatch	Submission (arm-triangle choke)	3	4:11
Welterweight	Nordine Taleb	def.	Erick Silva	KO (punches)	2	1:34
Middleweight	Vitor Miranda	def.	Marcelo Guimarães	TKO (head kick and punches)	2	1:09
Featherweight	Darren Elkins	def.	Chas Skelly	Decision (unanimous) (30–27, 29–27, 30–26)	3	5:00
Preliminary Card (UFC Fight Pass)
Lightweight	Diego Sanchez	def.	Jim Miller	Decision (unanimous) (29–28, 29–28, 29–28)	3	5:00
Lightweight	Jason Saggo	def.	Justin Salas	TKO (punches)	1	4:31
Featherweight	Teruto Ishihara	def.	Julian Erosa	KO (punches)	2	0:34

== Bonus awards ==
The following fighters were awarded $50,000 bonuses:

- Fight of the Night: Conor McGregor vs. Nate Diaz
- Performance of the Night: Nate Diaz and Miesha Tate

== Reported payout ==
The following is the reported payout to the fighters as reported to the Nevada State Athletic Commission. It does not include sponsor money and also does not include the UFC's traditional "fight night" bonuses.

- Nate Diaz: $500,000 (no win bonus) def. Conor McGregor: $1,000,000
- Miesha Tate: $92,000 (includes $46,000 win bonus) def. Holly Holm: $500,000
- Ilir Latifi: $50,000 (includes $25,000 win bonus) def. Gian Villante: $36,000
- Corey Anderson: $40,000 (includes $20,000 win bonus) def. Tom Lawlor: $28,000
- Amanda Nunes: $56,000 (includes $28,000 win bonus) def. Valentina Shevchenko: $14,000
- Siyar Bahadurzada: $38,000 (includes $19,000 win bonus) def. Brandon Thatch: $22,000
- Nordine Taleb: $30,000 (includes $15,000 win bonus) def. Erick Silva: $34,000
- Vitor Miranda: $32,000 (includes $16,000 win bonus) def. Marcelo Guimarães: $13,000
- Darren Elkins: $74,000 (includes $37,000 win bonus) def. Chas Skelly: $21,000
- Diego Sanchez: $150,000 (includes $75,000 win bonus) def. Jim Miller: $59,000
- Jason Saggo: $20,000 (includes $10,000 win bonus) def. Justin Salas: $16,000
- Teruto Ishihara: $34,000 (includes $17,000 win bonus) def. Julian Erosa: $12,000

== See also ==
- List of UFC events
- 2016 in UFC
- UFC 202: Diaz vs McGregor 2
