= Full Force Fighting =

MMA promoter based in Colorado

- Company type: Private
- Industry: Mixed martial arts promotion
- Founded: 2011
- Headquarters: Denver, Colorado, United States
- Key people: Thomas "Wildman" Denny (MMA Premiere Fitness) and Seth Daniels (Fight To Win)

Full Force Fighting (FFF) is a mixed martial arts (MMA) promotion based in Colorado. The organization's first event, Full Force Fighting Vol. 1, was held on January 29, 2011 at the Paramount Theater in Denver. The event was co-promoted by Fight To Win and Thomas "Wildman" Denny. Attempting to restore prestige back to combat sports, there was a business casual dress code enforced at the event.

== Full Force Fighting Vol. 1 ==
=== Results ===
==== Amateur ====
- Women's 120 lb (54 kg; 8.6 st) bout: Naylen Schmidt vs. Heather Sachleben

Sachleben defeated Schmidt by unanimous decision.

- Middleweight bout: Tito Solis vs. Brian Scraper

Solis defeated Scraper by TKO 8 seconds into the second round.

- Lightweight bout: Jeff Estrada vs. Jeremy Hastings

Estrada defeated Hastings by unanimous decision (30-27, 30-27, 30-27).

==== Professional ====
- Heavyweight bout: Tim Brower vs. Brandon Griffin

Griffin defeated Brower by TKO 1:19 in the first round.

- Lightweight bout: Lorant T Nelson vs. Ricardo McKinney

Nelson defeated McKinney by TKO 14 seconds into the first round.

- Lightweight bout: Josh Cavan vs. Matt McAnachy

Cavan defeated McAnachy by TKO 4:37 into the second round.

- Middleweight bout: Jason Lee vs. Todd Meredith

Lee defeated Meredith by KO 38 seconds into the first round by a knee strike to the chin.

- 175 lb (79 kg; 12.5 st) bout: Jeremy Kimball vs. Aaron Romero

Kimball defeated Romero by TKO 51 seconds into the first round.

- Middleweight bout: Lumumba Sayers vs. Edward Banks

Sayers defeated Banks by submission (arm triangle) 2:39 into the first round.

- Light Heavyweight Championship bout: Cody Donovan vs. Xavier Saccamano

Donovan defeated Saccamano by submission (rear-naked choke) 3:35 into the second round.

- Lightweight Championship bout: Justin Salas vs. Rob Emerson

Salas defeated Emerson by unanimous decision (29-28,29-28,29-28).

== Current Champions ==
Division	Upper weight limit	Champion	Since	Title Defenses
Light heavyweight	205 lb (93 kg; 14.6 st)	Cody Donovan	January 29, 2011 (Full Force Fighting - Vol. 1)	0
Lightweight	155 lb (70 kg; 11.1 st)	Justin Salas	January 29, 2011 (Full Force Fighting - Vol. 1)	0
