= The Ultimate Fighter 5 =

UFC mixed martial arts television series and event in 2007

- Season 5
- Starring: Dana White, Jens Pulver, and B.J. Penn

Release
- Original network: Spike TV
- Original release: April 5 – June 23, 2007

Season chronology
- ← Previous; The Ultimate Fighter 4

The Ultimate Fighter 5 was the fifth season of the Ultimate Fighting Championship produced reality television series The Ultimate Fighter. As with the show's usual format, sixteen prospective mixed martial arts fighters were secluded in a house near Las Vegas, Nevada and trained together while participating in a single-elimination tournament, with the winner being awarded a six-figure UFC contract. This season featured only one weight class, lightweights (146–155 lb) and the fighters were divided into two teams; one coached by former UFC Lightweight Champion Jens Pulver and the other by former UFC Welterweight Champion and former lightweight champion B.J. Penn. The season was well known among fans for the large number of fighters kicked off from the show.

The two coaches, along with the finalists of the tournament, fought at The Ultimate Finale, a televised MMA fight card that aired live at the completion of the series.

The series premiered on April 5, 2007 on Spike TV in the United States and Canada at 10:00 p.m. ET/PT and concluded on June 23. Filming began in mid-January 2007.

== Cast ==
=== Coaches ===
Team Pulver

- Jens Pulver, head coach
- Matt Pena, boxing instructor
- Taisei Kikuchi, submissions instructor
- Kirk White, wrestling instructor
- Matt Hughes, guest coach
- Jeremy Horn, guest coach

Team Penn

- B.J. Penn, head coach
- Rudolph Valentino, kickboxing instructor
- Tony DeSouza, wrestling instructor
- Reagan Penn, jiu jitsu instructor
- Randy Couture, guest coach

=== Fighters ===
Team Penn

- Gray Maynard, Matt Wiman, Gabe Ruediger, Joe Lauzon, Rob Emerson, Andy Wang, Allen Berube, Noah Thomas

Team Pulver

- Corey Hill, Nate Diaz, Brandon Melendez, Marlon Sims, Manny Gamburyan, Cole Miller, Brian Geraghty, Wayne Weems

=== Others ===
- Host: Dana White
- Narrator: Mike Rowe

== Episodes ==
Episode 1: It's Like Anarchy Here (Original Air Date Apr 05, 2007)

- The team selection process nearly goes awry when B.J. Penn asks the fighters to raise their hands if they want to join his team and want nothing to do with Team Pulver. Ten of the sixteen fighters do. Dana White insists the coaches still pick the teams one-by-one.
- Gabe Ruediger enters the series around 20 pounds overweight and frets over his inability to lose weight.
- Cole Miller defeated Allen Berube by a submission (triangle choke) at 2:33 of the first round.

Episode 2: Not in this House (Original Air Date Apr 12, 2007)

- Allen Berube returns to the house and announces he will stay in the house and continue to train so he can act as a substitute should someone become injured. (All subsequent eliminated fighters also remain at the house.)
- Team Penn members Matt Wiman and Gabe Ruediger repeatedly butt heads after Ruediger taunts Wiman because of an unexplained personal dislike of him. Their verbal sparring impacts the team as time from training was dedicated to quelling the feud.
- Penn tries to influence Pulver's fight selection by having Rob Emerson goad Corey Hill into fighting him, a match he prefers. Pulver picks Gamburyan to fight Thomas instead.
- Members of the blue team write a number of benign messages on the house wall ("Team Penn supports our troops") with a marker.
- Emerson then writes the words "Suck it Team Pulver" on the game room wall, ostensibly as a joke, but gold team members Nate Diaz and Gamburyan take offense and confront Team Penn about the markings. Gamburyan was looking to fight about it, then threatens to leave the house before his teammate Hill calms him down.
- Manny Gamburyan defeated Noah Thomas by a submission (kimura) at 2:09 of the first round.
- Gamburyan was the main aggressor, with Thomas often defending against his opponent's attempts to drop him to the ground.

Episode 3: This is My Zone (Original Air Date Apr 19, 2007)

- Penn calls Gabe Ruediger out in front of the entire team, saying that he does not think Ruediger is taking the training as seriously as he should.
- Jeremy Horn is brought in as Team Pulver's special guest coach. Horn is especially impressed with Corey Hill, who admitted he did not train regularly at a gym.
- Ruediger undergoes a "colonic" in an effort to make weight. His teammates however were unimpressed, calling it an easy way out of his problem and accusing him of caring more about the procedure than training.
- Emerson and Noah Thomas of Team Penn run around the house in thongs, upsetting Diaz. Diaz decides that he now wants to fight Emerson. At the fight announcement, Pulver picks Diaz who then selects Emerson.
- Nate Diaz defeated Rob Emerson by submission (rear naked choke) at 4:45 of round two.
- The first round was mainly an aggressive striking game by both sides and the second round was characterized by Diaz's aggression and successful ground game. White tells both fighters that the fight was one of the best in the history of the series.

Episode 4: Waah, Waah! (Original Air Date Apr 26, 2007)

- Wayne Weems is shown to be lagging behind the rest of the gold team, to the frustration of Pulver.
- During training, Gabe Ruediger lobbies Penn about fighting Weems because he is the obvious weak link of Team Pulver. However, this irritates some other members of Team Penn, especially Rob Emerson, who confronts Ruediger about it.
- Pulver brings in Matt Hughes as a special guest coach for the gold team.
- At the fight announcement, Melendez selects Wang to fight.
- Brandon Melendez defeated Andy Wang via unanimous decision after two rounds.
- Despite the pregame plan for Wang to use his Brazilian jiu-jitsu skills to his advantage and to take down his opponent, the BJJ blackbelt stays on his feet to strike and is dominated. He cries after the match for letting down his teammates, but Penn shows no sympathy for Wang, who ignored his instructions during the match.

Episode 5: Put me Back In (Original Air Date May 3, 2007)

- Corey Hill picks Gabe Ruediger for the next fight.
- Ruediger, who was now at 173.5 lb, continues to take weight cutting lightly and shows little effort, despite the urging of his coaches and teammates. When Ruediger is sent to the sauna by his coaches, he passes out at 159.4 lb (three pounds over the limit of 156 lb).
- The cut drained Ruediger so much that he was sent to a hospital to get fluids via an IV. The match was called and when Ruediger returns to the house, he becomes a pariah.
- White, on hearing word of the cancelled bout, makes known his displeasure for fighters that cannot make weight and promptly expels Ruediger from the house. White also reinstates Rob Emerson to replace Ruediger and grants Team Pulver the chance to pick the next two fights to penalize Team Penn for not taking charge of Ruediger's weight.
- Team Pulver's next two matches will be Brian Geraghty vs. Joe Lauzon and Hill against Emerson.

Episode 6: All Your Might (Original Air Date May 10, 2007)

- At the Team Pulver session, Joe Lauzon's experience is emphasized – especially his knockout of Pulver at UFC 63. Pulver and Brian Geraghty however brushed it off and "forgot" it ever happened.
- Joe Lauzon defeats Brian Geraghty by submission (rear naked choke) at 1:13 of the first round.
- Corey Hill defeats Rob Emerson by unanimous decision. The bout was scored a draw after two rounds. In the third "sudden victory" round, neither fighter dominates. White says that while neither fighter was impressive during the round, he believes Emerson won. The judges disagreed and give a unanimous decision to Hill.
- After the fight, Hill reveals to his team that this was his first professional fight; he only had two amateur fights before.

Episode 7: Be the General (Original Air Date May 17, 2007)

- White cautions Penn, saying he is losing control of his team. Penn decides to kick Andy Wang off his team, who he said was insubordinate and constantly ignoring instructions.
- Wang resists the expulsion, but his protests to the coaches are ignored and deemed to be a waste of time. White is summoned, he decides no fighter can be without a team and approaches Pulver to see if Wang can join his team. Pulver consults with his team and they approved of Wang joining them. Wang however, remains resistant and cites loyalty to Team Penn. When White makes it clear there he had no option, Wang reluctantly joins.
- Sims constantly annoys the other fighters by bragging about his street fights and calling himself "Mr. Indestructible."
- With Corey Hill's win, Team Pulver matches Weems against Maynard. This leaves Sims against Wiman as the final preliminary round pairing.
- Gray Maynard defeats Wayne Weems by TKO (punches) at 2:47 of the first round.
- Matt Wiman defeats Marlon Sims by technical submission (rear naked choke) at 0:52 of the first round.

Episode 8: Not on the Concrete (Original Air Date May 24, 2007)

- White, Penn, and Pulver meet to decide quarterfinal matchups to find the most interesting matchups and to advance the best fighters to the next round. The meeting however was not without problems as the coaches could not agree on pairings and nearly come to blows. White wants to match the best four fighters against the worst four, and picks Diaz, Lauzon, Wiman and Maynard as the best four fighters. White and Penn coincidentally draw up the same fights, but Pulver disagrees and says that Gamburyan should also be considered and suggests Penn and White are colluding. White however denies it and implements his plan. The quarterfinal matchups are Cole Miller vs. Joe Lauzon, Brandon Melendez vs. Gray Maynard, Manny Gamburyan vs. Matt Wiman, and Nate Diaz vs. Corey Hill.
- After a night of heavy drinking, Marlon Sims and Noah Thomas get into an argument and a fight in the backyard of the house, which ended with Sims slamming Thomas on his head on concrete. After the fight, the two call a truce and promise to settle the matter at the finale. When White gets wind of the confrontation, he makes a personal visit to the house and lectures the cast about how he tried to change the image of the UFC from mindless brawling to legitimate athletic competition, and how this fight damages his efforts. He immediately expels both Sims and Thomas from the show, as well as Allen Berube, who instigated the match and told them they would not get kicked out for fighting.
- With Thomas and Berube kicked off the show because of the fight and Gabe Ruediger kicked off because of missing weight and Andy Wang kicked off the team and sent to Team Pulver; this leaves Team Penn with only 4 fighters (Lauzon, Maynard, Wiman, and Rob Emerson).
- Joe Lauzon defeats Cole Miller by TKO (strikes) at 3:58 in the second round.
- Lauzon, when he had pinned Miller down early in the second round, strikes the Team Pulver member on the back of the head with an elbow and was assessed a point deduction. Miller is noticeably impaired after the strike, but continues the fight, eventually losing. White is convinced after talking with Lauzon that the strike was inadvertent, and the Team Penn member regrets it. White also praises Miller's dedication but strongly advises him against ever competing when dazed again, for his own safety.

Episode 9: It Was A Brawl (Original Air Date May 31, 2007)

- Brandon Melendez feels that Pulver is overtraining him, and confronts the head coach about the issue. Melendez feels so strongly that he later approaches Pulver about training with Team Penn instead. After talking it over with Pulver, they resolve their issues and Melendez remains with the gold team.
- Randy Couture is a guest coach for Team Penn, focusing on wrestling skills.
- Cole Miller and Nate Diaz play pranks on one another while each sleeps. The pranks culminate in each fighter throwing the other's mattress into the pool and Miller getting "antiqued" (getting covered in baby powder after being drenched in water).
- Andy Wang becomes personally involved in helping Melendez make weight. Melendez does (barely) and expresses his gratitude to Wang for his help.
- Gray Maynard defeated Brandon Melendez by submission (guillotine choke) at 4:07 in the second round.

Episode 10: Traitor (Original Air Date Jun 07, 2007)

- Nate Diaz decides to train with Team Penn because he feels like he needs to distance himself from Corey Hill in order to prepare himself better for the fight. Joe Lauzon and other members of the blue team are not happy with the idea, calling Diaz a "spy."
- Members of Team Pulver are also displeased, especially Gamburyan who flips Diaz off, and Brandon Melendez who then calls him a "traitor." Pulver is somewhat upset that Diaz went to Team Penn's practice, but says later that he does not care, and "if he wants to put on a blue jersey, that's his prerogative."
- Nate Diaz defeated Corey Hill by submission (triangle choke) at 3:02 in the first round.
- Karo Parisyan arrives at the training center during a Team Pulver training session to practice with his cousin Gamburyan. Diaz claims he has no problem with Parisyan, even though he defeated his older brother Nick at UFC 49.
- Manny Gamburyan defeated Matt Wiman by unanimous decision after two rounds.

Episode 11: I Humbly Apologize (Original Air Date Jun 14, 2007)

- After Gamburyan's fight, his cousin Karo Parisyan jokes around with Nate Diaz by playfully slapping him, talking down to him, and grabbing him by the back of the neck. The two get into a verbal disagreement and almost come to blows before Pulver and the rest of the team break up the confrontation.
- White has to decide the semifinal matches via phone conversation from England with Penn and Pulver. White then proceeds to prank Pulver by telling him it will be teammate vs. teammate in the semifinals, only to later tell them the real matches will be Gamburyan against Lauzon and Nate Diaz vs. Gray Maynard.
- After White gets back from England, he surprises the fighters by having a fancy dinner at the house with both teams together. White then proceeds to announce to all the fighters that whichever two fighters make it to the finals will receive free DirecTV Service.
- Manny Gamburyan defeats Joe Lauzon by unanimous decision after three rounds.
- After the fight, White states that alongside Rashad Evans from The Ultimate Fighter 2, he has underestimated Gamburyan the most out of every fighter from all 5 seasons. He then goes on to say, "he's 10 times the fighter I thought he was, and I humbly apologize to Manny for underestimating him."

Episode 12: Gave A Hundred (Original Air Date Jun 14, 2007)

- The remaining fighters play a series of pranks on each other, engaging in a fruit war and shaving an inebriated Cole Miller's head when he fell asleep in the bathroom.
- White pits the two team coaches against each other in a ping-pong match with a $10,000 cash prize. Pulver wins the best-of-three series, the cash and a thousand dollar bonus for each member of his team.
- Nate Diaz defeats Gray Maynard by submission (guillotine choke) at 1:17 in the second round.
- Diaz moves into the finale to face his teammate Manny Gamburyan.

== Tournament Bracket ==
Elimination Round
Cole Miller	SUB
Allen Berube	1
Brian Geraghty	1
Joe Lauzon	SUB
Marlon Sims	1
Matt Wiman	SUB
Manny Gamburyan	SUB
Noah Thomas	1
Wayne Weems	1
Gray Maynard	TKO
Brandon Melendez	UD
Andy Wang	2
Nate Diaz	SUB
Rob Emerson	2
Corey Hill	UD
Rob Emerson*	3

Quarter-Finals
Cole Miller	2
Joe Lauzon	TKO
Matt Wiman	2
Manny Gamburyan	UD
Gray Maynard	SUB
Brandon Melendez	2
Nate Diaz	SUB
Corey Hill	1

Semi-Finals
Joe Lauzon	3
Manny Gamburyan	UD
Gray Maynard	2
Nate Diaz	SUB

Finale
Manny Gamburyan	2
Nate Diaz	SUB

* Gabe Ruediger missed weight and was expelled from the show. Emerson replaced him against Hill.

Legend
	Team Pulver
	Team Penn
UD	Unanimous Decision
SUB	Submission
TKO	Technical Knockout

== The Ultimate Fighter 5 Finale ==
The Ultimate Fighter: Team Pulver vs. Team Penn Finale
- The poster for The Ultimate Fighter: Team Pulver vs. Team Penn Finale
- Promotion: Ultimate Fighting Championship
- Date: June 23, 2007
- Venue: Palms Casino Resort
- City: Las Vegas, Nevada
- Total gate: $526,000

Event chronology
UFC 72: Victory	The Ultimate Fighter: Team Pulver vs. Team Penn Finale	UFC 73: Stacked

The Ultimate Fighter: Team Pulver vs. Team Penn Finale (also known as The Ultimate Fighter 5 Finale) was a mixed martial arts event held by the Ultimate Fighting Championship (UFC) on June 23, 2007.

=== Results ===
Main card (Spike TV)
Weight class				Method	Round	Time	Notes
Lightweight	B.J. Penn	def.	Jens Pulver	Submission (rear-naked choke)	2	3:12
Lightweight	Nate Diaz	def.	Manny Gamburyan	TKO (shoulder injury)	2	0:20	(Note: The Ultimate Fighter 5 lightweight tournament final.)
Middleweight	Thales Leites	def.	Floyd Sword	Submission (arm-triangle choke)	1	3:50
Lightweight	Roger Huerta	def.	Doug Evans	TKO (punches)	2	3:30
Preliminary card
Lightweight	Joe Lauzon	def.	Brandon Melendez	Submission (triangle choke)	2	2:09	(Note: This bout aired on the Spike broadcast following the Emerson vs. Maynard fight. Melendez failed to make the 156 pound lightweight limit, weighing in at 157 pounds.)
Lightweight	Cole Miller	def.	Andy Wang	TKO (head kick and punches)	1	1:10	(Note: This bout aired on the Spike broadcast following the Diaz vs. Gamburyan fight.)
Lightweight	Gray Maynard	vs.	Rob Emerson	No Contest (double TKO slam)	2	0:39	(Note: Both men were deemed unable to continue after Maynard knocked himself unconscious during a takedown of Emerson, who submitted due to an aggravated injury of the ribs. This bout aired on the Spike Broadcast following the Leites vs. Sword fight.)
Lightweight	Leonard Garcia	def.	Allen Berube	Submission (rear-naked choke)	1	4:22
Lightweight	Matt Wiman	def.	Brian Geraghty	TKO (punches)	1	2:09

=== Bonus awards ===
The following fighters received $40,000 bonuses.

- Fight of the Night: Gray Maynard vs. Rob Emerson
- Knockout of the Night: Cole Miller
- Submission of the Night: Joe Lauzon

== Coaches' Fight ==
The Ultimate Fighter: Team Pulver vs. Team Penn Finale was held on June 23, 2007 in Paradise, Nevada.

- Lightweight bout: Jens Pulver vs. B.J. Penn

B.J. Penn defeated Jens Pulver via submission (rear naked choke) at 3:12 of the second round.

== See also ==
- Ultimate Fighting Championship
- List of UFC champions
- List of UFC events
- 2007 in UFC
- The Ultimate Fighter
- List of current UFC fighters
