= Matt Veach =

American mixed martial arts fighter (born 1981)

- Born: May 31, 1981 (age 45); Springfield, Illinois, United States
- Nationality: American
- Height: 5 ft 7 in (1.70 m)
- Weight: 170 lb (77 kg; 12 st)
- Division: Lightweight; Welterweight
- Stance: Orthodox
- Fighting out of: Granite City, Illinois
- Team: H.I.T. Squad
- Wrestling: NCAA Division 1 Wrestling
- Years active: 2006-present

Mixed martial arts record
- Total: 22
- Wins: 17
- By knockout: 5
- By submission: 8
- By decision: 4
- Losses: 5
- By submission: 5

Other information
- Mixed martial arts record from Sherdog

Matt Alan Veach (born May 31, 1981) is a retired American mixed martial arts fighter who most recently competed in the Welterweight division. A professional competitor since 2006, he has competed for the UFC, BAMMA, the MFC, and Cage Warriors.

== Background ==
Born and raised in Illinois, Veach started wrestling in the sixth grade and competed for 12 years. He was a high school state placer, Junior College All-American, and a D-1 NCAA qualifier for Eastern Illinois University.

== Mixed martial arts career ==
=== Ultimate Fighting Championship ===
Veach made his UFC debut at UFC Fight Night: Lauzon vs. Stephens, facing off against UFC veteran, Matt Grice. After getting knocked down in a brief exchange early in the first round, Veach quickly recovered and dropped Grice, following up with punches on the ground as the referee halted the bout at 4:34 of the very first round, giving Matt the win via TKO.

At The Ultimate Fighter: Heavyweights Finale in a fight against Frank Edgar as a replacement for an injured Kurt Pellegrino, Veach made his second appearance in the UFC. The first round was very close; Edgar controlled most of the standup part of the round, while Veach landed numerous takedowns and slams. However, early in the second round, Edgar caught Veach with an over hand right that stunned him, leaving him open for Edgar to take him to the ground, achieve the back mounted position and sink in a rear naked choke for the win at 2:22 of round two. This marked the first loss of Veach's professional mixed martial arts career.

Veach faced Paul Kelly at UFC 112, losing via second round submission. The loss was his second straight getting him released from his UFC contract.

=== Post UFC ===
After being released from the UFC, Veach continued to train with Matt Hughes and Robbie Lawler at The HIT Squad. He won 4 straight fights in different promotions following his UFC release.

=== Maximum Fighting Championships ===
In February 2011, Veach signed with the Canadian promotion, MFC. His debut came at the main card of MFC 28 against Drew Fickett. Veach took the fight with only five days notice, stepping in for the MFC lightweight champion, Antonio McKee. He lost the fight via submission in the first round.

=== BAMMA ===
Veach faced off against 'Judo' Jim Wallhead in the main event of BAMMA 12 in Newcastle, England on March 9, 2013. He lost the fight via submission in the first round.

== Mixed martial arts record ==
Professional record breakdown
22 matches	17 wins	5 losses
By knockout	5	0
By submission	8	5
By decision	4	0

Res.	Record	Opponent	Method	Event	Date	Round	Time	Location	Notes
Win	17–5	Steven Mann	Submission (armbar)	Shamrock FC 279	December 2, 2016	3	2:10	St. Louis, Missouri, United States	
Loss	16–5	Jim Wallhead	Submission (rear-naked choke)	BAMMA 12	March 9, 2013	1	3:05	Newcastle upon Tyne, Tyne and Wear, North East England	
Win	16–4	Zac Kelley	TKO (punches)	C3 Fights: Rumble at Red Rock	August 18, 2012	1	4:58	Oklahoma, United States	
Loss	15–4	Eric Wisely	Submission (armbar)	Gladiator Cage Fights: Knockout Night 1	April 23, 2011	2	2:49	Marion, Illinois, United States	
Loss	15–3	Drew Fickett	Submission (armbar)	MFC 28: Supremacy	February 25, 2011	1	0:36	Edmonton, Alberta, Canada	Catchweight (160 lbs) bout.
Win	15–2	Donavon Winters	Decision (split)	Capital City Cage Wars 6	January 29, 2011	3	5:00	Springfield, United States	
Win	14–2	Kenneth Rosfort-Nees	Decision (unanimous)	Cage Warriors 38: Young Guns	October 1, 2010	5	5:00	London, England	Won the Cage Warriors Lightweight Championship.
Win	13–2	McKenzie Jackson	Submission (arm-triangle choke)	Mainstream MMA: Swing Back	August 21, 2010	1	1:26	Cedar Rapids, United States	
Win	12–2	Kalel Robinson	Decision (unanimous)	28 Productions	June 26, 2010	3	5:00	St. Louis, United States	
Loss	11–2	Paul Kelly	Submission (guillotine choke)	UFC 112	April 10, 2010	2	3:41	Abu Dhabi, United Arab Emirates	Welterweight bout.
Loss	11–1	Frankie Edgar	Submission (rear-naked choke)	The Ultimate Fighter: Heavyweights Finale	December 5, 2009	2	2:22	Las Vegas, United States	Fight of the Night.
Win	11–0	Matt Grice	TKO (punches)	UFC Fight Night: Lauzon vs. Stephens	February 7, 2009	1	4:34	Tampa, United States	
Win	10–0	Alex Carter	Submission (rear-naked choke)	Capital City Cage Wars	November 1, 2008	1	1:05	Springfield, United States	
Win	9–0	Diego Brandão	TKO (injury)	Pro Battle MMA: Immediate Impact	October 4, 2008	2	1:28	Springdale, United States	
Win	8–0	Brent Mehrhoff	Submission (rear-naked choke)	XFO 25: Outdoor War 4	August 9, 2008	2	2:22	Island Lake, United States	
Win	7–0	Matt MacGrath	Decision (unanimous)	MFC 16: Anger Management	May 9, 2008	3	5:00	Edmonton, Alberta, Canada	
Win	6–0	Edgar Wade	Submission (rear-naked choke)	Iowa Challenge 44	October 6, 2007	1	1:01	Keokuk, United States	
Win	5–0	Marcus Hermann	Submission (triangle choke)	Iowa Challenge 42	September 9, 2007	1	0:57	Waterloo, United States	
Win	4–0	Jason West	TKO (punches)	Extreme Challenge 82	August 18, 2007	1	3:24	Springfield, United States	
Win	3–0	Charles Wilson	Submission (rear-naked choke)	Pure Force 4	September 19, 2006	1	4:36	Tinley Park, United States	
Win	2–0	Adam Therriault	Submission (punches)	Shootfighting Challenge	August 26, 2006	1	2:35	Lincoln, United States	
Win	1–0	John Chester	TKO	Supreme Fighting Challenge	July 22, 2006	2	N/A	Belleville, United States	
