= MFC 30 =

Maximum Fighting Championship MMA event in 2011

MFC 30: Up Close and Personal
- Promotion: Maximum Fighting Championship
- Date: June 10, 2011
- Venue: Mayfield Inn Trade and Conference Centre
- City: Edmonton, Alberta

Event chronology
MFC 29: Conquer	MFC 30: Up Close and Personal	MFC 31: Rundown

MFC 30: Up Close and Personal was a mixed martial arts event held by the Maximum Fighting Championship (MFC) on June 10, 2011 at the Mayfield Inn Trade and Conference Centre in Edmonton, Alberta. The event was broadcast live on HDNet.

== Background ==
According to MFC Director of Media and Fighter Relations Scott Zerr, the promotion and Lightweight title holder Antonio McKee opted to "mutually vacate" the title.

Thomas Denny vs. Sheldon Westcott was a rematch from MFC 28 which ended in a split draw.

The judges' scores for the Demarce/Washington were initially read incorrectly with Washington announced as the winner. This was later corrected during the broadcast by the announcers.

== Results ==
- Lightweight bout: (United States) Drew Fickett vs. (United States) Brian Cobb

Cobb defeated Fickett via TKO (punches) at 4:44 in round 1.

- Welterweight bout: (United States) Marcus Davis vs. (United States) Pete Spratt

Davis defeated Spratt via unanimous decision (29–28, 30–27, 29–28).

- Catchweight (165 lb.) bout: (United States) Thomas Denny vs. (Canada) Sheldon Westcott

Westcott defeated Denny via unanimous decision (29–27, 29–27, 29–27). Westcott was docked one point in the second round for repeated punches to the back of the head.

- Welterweight bout: (Brazil) Dhiego Lima vs. (United States) Jamie Tone

Lima defeated Toney via KO (punches) at 3:47 of round 1.

- Catchweight (159 lb.) bout: (United States) Robert Washington vs. (Canada) Curtis Demarce

Demarce defeated Washington via split decision (30–27, 28–29, 29–28).

- Middleweight bout: (Canada) Cody Krahn vs. (Sweden) Andreas Spång

Spång defeated Krahn via submission (guillotine choke) at 1:18 of round 1.

- Lightweight bout: (United States) Scott Cleve vs. (Zimbabwe) Mukai Maromo

Maromo defeated Cleve via TKO (punches) at 0:36 of round 1.

- Lightweight bout: (Canada) Garret Nybakken vs. (Canada) Jevon Marshall

Nybakken defeated Marshall via TKO (punches) at 0:16 of round 1.
