= UFC 62 =

UFC mixed martial arts event in 2006

UFC 62: Liddell vs. Sobral 2
- The poster for UFC 62: Liddell vs. Sobral 2
- Promotion: Ultimate Fighting Championship
- Date: August 26, 2006
- Venue: Mandalay Bay Events Center
- City: Las Vegas, Nevada
- Attendance: 11,859 (8,954 paid)
- Total gate: $3,040,880
- Buyrate: 500,000
- Total purse: $407,000 (disclosed only)

Event chronology
UFC Fight Night: Sanchez vs. Parisyan	UFC 62: Liddell vs. Sobral 2	UFC 63: Hughes vs. Penn

UFC 62: Liddell vs. Sobral 2 was a mixed martial arts event held by the Ultimate Fighting Championship on August 26, 2006. The event took place at the Mandalay Bay Events Center in Las Vegas, Nevada and was broadcast live on pay-per-view in the United States and Canada.

The main event featured a UFC Light Heavyweight Championship between Chuck Liddell and Renato Sobral. The co-main event was a TUF rematch between Forrest Griffin and Stephan Bonnar.

== Results ==
Main Card
Weight class				Method	Round	Time	Notes
Light Heavyweight	Chuck Liddell (c)	def.	Renato Sobral	TKO (punches)	1	1:35	(Note: For the UFC Light Heavyweight Championship)
Light Heavyweight	Forrest Griffin	def.	Stephan Bonnar	Decision (unanimous) (30–27, 30–27, 30–27)	3	5:00	(Note: Following the bout, Bonnar tested positive by the Nevada State Athletic Commission for boldenone, a banned anabolic steroid, and received a nine-month suspension and a $5,000 fine.)
Welterweight	Nick Diaz	def.	Josh Neer	Submission (kimura)	3	1:42	(Note: Thiago Alves was originally scheduled to fight Josh Neer, but pulled out of his fight due to illness.)
Heavyweight	Cheick Kongo	def.	Christian Wellisch	KO (knee)	1	2:51
Lightweight	Hermes França	def.	Jamie Varner	Submission (armbar)	3	3:31	(Note: Spencer Fisher was originally scheduled for the match, Franca was Fisher's replacement because Fisher pulled out on August 4. A point was deducted in round 3.)
Preliminary Card
Light Heavyweight	Eric Schafer	def.	Rob MacDonald	Technical Submission (arm-triangle choke)	1	2:26	(Note: This fight was aired, even though it was a preliminary match.)
Light Heavyweight	Wilson Gouveia	def.	Wes Combs	Submission (rear-naked choke)	1	3:23	(Note: This fight was aired, even though it was a preliminary match.)
Light Heavyweight	David Heath	def.	Cory Walmsley	Submission (rear-naked choke)	1	2:32
Middleweight	Yushin Okami	def.	Alan Belcher	Decision (unanimous) (29–28, 30–27, 30–27)	3	5:00

== Bonus awards ==
- Fight of the Night: Hermes Franca vs. Jamie Varner
- Knockout of the Night: Chuck Liddell
- Submission of the Night: Nick Diaz

== Reported payout ==
Chuck Liddell: $250,000

Forrest Griffin: $32,000

Renato "Babalu" Sobral: $21,000

Nick Diaz: $20,000

Stephan Bonnar: $16,000

Cheick Kongo: $12,000

Hermes Franca: $12,000

Yushin Okami: $8,000

Josh Neer: $6,000

Rob MacDonald: $5,000

David Heath: $4,000

Eric Schafer $4,000

Wilson Gouveia: $4,000

Alan Belcher: $3,000

Christian Wellisch $3,000

Jamie Varner: $3,000

Wes Combs: $2,000

Cory Walmsley $2,000

Total Fighter Payouts: $407,000

== See also ==
- Ultimate Fighting Championship
- List of UFC champions
- List of UFC events
- 2006 in UFC
