= John Albert (fighter) =

American mixed martial artist

- Born: October 13, 1986 (age 40); Reno, Nevada, United States
- Other names: Prince
- Height: 5 ft 8 in (1.73 m)
- Weight: 137 lb (62 kg; 9.8 st)
- Division: Bantamweight
- Reach: 71 in (180 cm)
- Fighting out of: Puyallup, Washington, United States
- Team: Victory Athletics
- Years active: 2007-2013

Mixed martial arts record
- Total: 12
- Wins: 7
- By knockout: 4
- By submission: 3
- Losses: 5
- By submission: 5

Other information
- Mixed martial arts record from Sherdog

John Brian Albert (born October 13, 1986) is a retired American mixed martial artist. A professional from 2007 until 2013, he competed for the UFC, and was a competitor on Spike TV's The Ultimate Fighter: Team Bisping vs. Team Miller.

== Background ==
Albert was born in Reno, Nevada but was raised in Puyallup, Washington. His brother, uncle, and grandfather have all served in the military and are some of Albert's heroes. He moved out of his mother's house before he graduated high school. He attended Gov. John R. Rogers High School, graduating in 2005. After graduation Albert began working as an electrician, earning enough to buy himself a new truck, and helping to afford his living expenses easily. He worked full-time up until the day he left for The Ultimate Fighter.

== Mixed martial arts ==
=== Early career ===
Growing up Albert idolized martial arts legends Jackie Chan and Jet Li, claiming he wanted to be a "karate master" just like them. He began taking Tae Kwon Do classes, and received his third level belt before giving it up due to not being able to afford it. In junior high Albert was a part of his school's wrestling team, but did not pursue it during high school like his brother who was a two-time state placer.

Albert began looking into training MMA after a friend asked him to help sharpen up his wrestling skills. After only two weeks of training, his friend invited him to come train with UFC veteran Dennis Hallman. Albert obliged and started training with Hallman and his team. Albert claims he fell in love with the sport after being "explicit rocked".

Only three months into training Albert began fighting as an amateur. He spent two years on the amateur circuit, obtaining a 12-1 record while collecting 4 championships. In 2007 he made his professional debut winning via TKO in only 48 seconds into round one. His next bout also ended via first-round TKO, taking Albert's record to 2-0. After his second bout Albert took nearly a two-year hiatus before returning to competition. He returned with four wins, (three submissions and one knockout), all in a five-month span.

He took another hiatus from the sport, returning one year later from his sixth fight, taking a highly controversial loss to journeymen, Roy Bradshaw. During the fight Albert dislocated his rib and while on the ground in pain, Bradshaw put Albert in a guillotine, but since his rib was causing so much pain, he tapped. The commission deemed it submission by guillotine, and since Albert was at the hospital he could not dispute it.

=== The Ultimate Fighter ===
In 2011, Albert had signed with the UFC to compete on The Ultimate Fighter: Team Bisping vs. Team Miller. In the first episode, Albert fought Orville Smith, winning via first round submission (rear-naked choke). The win gained Albert entry into the Ultimate Fighter house. He was selected as a part of Team Bisping.

Albert next fought against Team Mayhem's top bantamweight pick, John Dodson. Albert lost the fight via unanimous decision.

=== Ultimate Fighting Championship ===
Though he did not win the Ultimate Fighter, Albert was signed to an exclusive contract with the UFC. Albert officially made his UFC debut on December 3, 2011 at The Ultimate Fighter 14 Finale, defeating Dustin Pague via TKO in the first round. Albert dropped Pague with a combination in the opening moments, put him in the giftwrap position and unloaded on him with heavy ground and pound causing the referee to intervene.

Albert next faced Ivan Menjivar at UFC on Fuel TV 1 on February 15, 2012. After a back-and-forth first round, Albert lost the fight via submission.

Albert was expected to face Byron Bloodworth on June 1, 2012 at The Ultimate Fighter 15 Finale. However, Bloodworth was forced out of the bout and replaced by promotional newcomer Erik Pérez. Albert lost the fight via controversial armbar submission as he did not appear to verbally submit or tap out but the fight was stopped by referee Kim Winslow. Despite the loss, according to a tweet from Dana White, both fighters would receive a win bonus.

Albert faced Scott Jorgensen on December 8, 2012 at UFC on Fox 5. He lost the fight via submission in the first round. The fight was awarded Fight of the Night honors.

Albert faced Yaotzin Meza on July 27, 2013 at UFC on Fox 8. He lost the back-and-forth fight via submission in the second round and was released from the promotion shortly after.

== Championships and accomplishments ==
- Ultimate Fighting Championship
  - Fight of the Night (One time) vs. Scott Jorgensen

== Mixed martial arts record ==
Professional record breakdown
12 matches	7 wins	5 losses
By knockout	4	0
By submission	3	5
By decision	0	0

Res.	Record	Opponent	Method	Event	Date	Round	Time	Location	Notes
Loss	7–5	Yaotzin Meza	Submission (rear-naked choke)	UFC on Fox: Johnson vs. Moraga	July 27, 2013	2	2:49	Seattle, Washington, United States	
Loss	7–4	Scott Jorgensen	Submission (rear-naked choke)	UFC on Fox: Henderson vs. Diaz	December 8, 2012	1	4:59	Seattle, Washington, United States	Fight of the Night
Loss	7–3	Erik Pérez	Technical Submission (armbar)	The Ultimate Fighter 15 Finale	June 1, 2012	1	4:18	Las Vegas, Nevada, United States	
Loss	7–2	Ivan Menjivar	Submission (rear-naked choke)	UFC on Fuel TV: Sanchez vs. Ellenberger	February 15, 2012	1	3:45	Omaha, Nebraska, United States	
Win	7–1	Dustin Pague	TKO (punches)	The Ultimate Fighter 14 Finale	December 3, 2011	1	1:09	Las Vegas, Nevada, United States	
Loss	6–1	Roy Bradshaw	Submission (guillotine choke)	Guy Promotions 1	June 5, 2010	1	1:13	Renton, Washington, United States	
Win	6–0	John Martinez	TKO (doctor stoppage)	Carnage at the Creek 6	June 6, 2009	2	1:26	Shelton, Washington, United States	
Win	5–0	Bobby Corpuz	Submission (triangle choke)	CageSport 5	May 16, 2009	2	1:26	Tacoma, Washington, United States	
Win	4–0	Drew Brokenshire	Submission (armbar)	Genesis Fights 10	March 21, 2009	1	N/A	Shoreline, Washington, United States	
Win	3–0	Justin Fratto	Submission (triangle choke)	Desert Brawl 36	February 28, 2009	1	2:21	Redmond, Oregon, United States	
Win	2–0	Jesse Lopez	TKO (punches)	Xtreme Cage Combat 4	June 2, 2007	1	N/A	Tacoma, Washington, United States	
Win	1–0	Jared Scouten	TKO (punches)	Hooligan Fight Night	March 30, 2007	1	0:48	Chehalis, Washington, United States	
