= Drew Fickett =

American mixed martial arts fighter

- Born: December 24, 1979 (age 46); Tampa, Florida, U.S.
- Other names: Night Rider
- Height: 5 ft 10 in (1.78 m)
- Weight: 155 lb (70 kg; 11.1 st)
- Division: Lightweight (2010–present); Welterweight (1999–2010)
- Fighting out of: Tucson, Arizona, United States
- Team: Team Scrub
- Rank: Second degree black belt in Brazilian Jiu-Jitsu
- Years active: 1999–2014, 2023–present

Mixed martial arts record
- Total: 66
- Wins: 43
- By knockout: 4
- By submission: 31
- By decision: 8
- Losses: 23
- By knockout: 14
- By submission: 4
- By decision: 5

Other information
- Mixed martial arts record from Sherdog

Drew Fickett (born December 14, 1979) is an American mixed martial artist who competes in the Lightweight division. A professional competitor since 1999, Fickett has also formerly competed for the UFC, Strikeforce, DREAM, Cage Rage, the XFC, MFC, and King of the Cage.

== Background ==
Fickett is from Tucson, Arizona and began training in Kajukenbo when he was 10 years old. When Fickett was in high school he was a wrestler and practiced judo, with MMA legend Don Frye's original trainer. He was the second best wrestler in the state of Arizona during his junior year and began his career in MMA shortly after graduating from high school. After his college wrestling career at Pima Community College was ended prematurely due to a serious motorcycle accident, Fickett dropped out of college and moved to live in Phoenix, Arizona for two years to become trained as a mixed martial artist.

== Mixed martial arts career ==
=== Early career ===
Fickett began his professional MMA career in 1999 and quickly amassed an undefeated record of 12–0 in the first 20 months of his career. Before entering the UFC, Fickett had a record of 24–2 with notable wins over Dennis Hallman, Carlo Prater and Kenny Florian.

=== Ultimate Fighting championship ===
UFC President, Dana White stated that Fickett was originally supposed to be a contestant on the first season of The Ultimate Fighter, but upon watching his bout with Kenny Florian at a small mixed martial arts event, he had decided to sign Florian onto the show in his place. Fickett defeated Florian, but shortly after was incarcerated. White then went with Florian.

Fickett made his Ultimate Fighting Championship debut in February 2005 at UFC 51, losing to Nick Diaz via TKO. He went 4–3 in his tenure with the organization, with notable victories over Kurt Pellegrino, Josh Neer and a come-from-behind win over Josh Koscheck.

=== Post-UFC ===
Following his release from the UFC in 2007, Fickett stayed busy fighting for a number of smaller tier promotions including HDNet Fights, Cage Rage and Strikeforce.

Fickett had been scheduled to fight Ryan Ford for the Maximum Fighting Championship welterweight title at MFC 17: Hostile Takeover on July 25, 2008. However, after signing an agreement for the MFC fight, he signed another agreement to fight Luke Stewart at the Strikeforce: Melendez vs. Thomson event on June 27, 2008, as a replacement for an injured Joe Riggs. This placed him in breach of his agreement with MFC, which stated that he would not fight for five weeks prior to his MFC date. As a result, he ended up being removed from both fight cards, and MFC president/owner Mark Pavelich declared that Fickett would never again fight in the MFC.

From August 2008 to August 2009, Fickett suffered the worst year of his professional career, with only 2 wins versus 8 losses. Fickett later revealed in interviews that he had not even trained for these fights.

Fickett returned in 2010 with a renewed focus. He defeated fellow UFC veteran Derrick Noble by submission, ending his 5 fight losing streak. In September 2010, he won the one night Shine: Lightweight Grand Prix which saw him fight three times over the course of the evening. He ended all of the fights in the first round via submission and declared, "I'm back" in his post-fight interview.

=== Maximum Fighting Championship ===
Fickett signed a multi-fight contract with the Maximum Fighting Championship, announced in January 2011. His first fight was against Matt Veach at MFC 28 on February 25, 2011. He won via submission in the first round. MFC announced his release from the organization following his loss to Tatsuya Kawajiri.

=== Independent circuit ===
Fickett faced Luis Felix at CES MMA 22 on March 14, 2014. He lost by KO (head kick) in the second round.

== Championships and accomplishments ==
- Ultimate Fighting Championship
  - UFC Encyclopedia Awards
    - Fight of the Night (One time) vs. Karo Parisyan
    - Submission of the Night (One time) vs. Josh Koscheck
  - UFC.com Awards
    - 2005: Ranked #6 Submission of the Year vs. Josh Koscheck

== Mixed martial arts record ==
Professional record breakdown
66 matches	43 wins	23 losses
By knockout	4	14
By submission	31	4
By decision	8	5

Res.	Record	Opponent	Method	Event	Date	Round	Time	Location	Notes
Loss	43–23	Abe Alsaghir	Submission (rear-naked choke)	Legends of Combat 3	July 19, 2025	2	2:44	Wayne, Michigan, United States	Return to Lightweight.
Loss	43–22	Tyler Hill	Submission (heel hook)	Savage Fights 2	May 13, 2023	2	2:10	Hattiesburg, Mississippi, United States	
Win	43–21	Mark Kolker	Submission (rear-naked choke)	Savage Fights 1	January 28, 2023	2	3:49	Hattiesburg, Mississippi, United States	Return to Welterweight.
Loss	42–21	Luis Felix	KO (head kick)	CES MMA 22	March 14, 2014	2	2:29	Lincoln, Rhode Island, United States	
Loss	42–20	Andre Winner	Decision (unanimous)	Global Warrior Challenge 1	June 29, 2013	3	5:00	Kansas City, Missouri, United States	
Loss	42–19	Justin Gaethje	KO (punch)	Rage in the Cage 163	October 20, 2012	1	0:12	Chandler, Arizona, United States	Catchweight (165 lb) bout.
Loss	42–18	Jonatas Novaes	TKO (punches)	ShoFight 20	June 16, 2012	1	0:51	Springfield, Missouri, United States	Catchweight (160 lb) bout.
Win	42–17	Kevin Knabjian	Submission (guillotine choke)	Worldwide MMA 1	March 31, 2012	1	3:38	El Paso, Texas, United States	
Loss	41–17	Jamie Varner	TKO (submission to punches)	XFC 16	February 10, 2012	1	0:40	Knoxville, Tennessee, United States	Catchweight (160 lb) bout.
Loss	41–16	Ronys Torres	TKO (Submission to punches)	Amazon Forest Combat 1	September 14, 2011	1	0:47	Manaus, Brazil	Welterweight bout.
Loss	41–15	Tatsuya Kawajiri	TKO (punches)	Dream: Japan GP Final	July 16, 2011	1	4:41	Tokyo, Japan	
Loss	41–14	Brian Cobb	TKO (punches)	MFC 30	June 10, 2011	1	4:44	Edmonton, Alberta, Canada	
Win	41–13	Matt Veach	Submission (armbar)	MFC 28	February 25, 2011	1	0:36	Enoch, Alberta, Canada	Catchweight (160 lb) bout.
Win	40–13	Carlo Prater	Submission (rear-naked choke)	Shine Fights 3	September 10, 2010	1	2:02	Newkirk, Oklahoma, United States	Won the 2010 Shine Fights Lightweight Grand Prix.
Win	39–13	Dennis Bermudez	Submission (rear-naked choke)	Shine Fights 3	September 10, 2010	1	2:02	Newkirk, Oklahoma, United States	2010 Shine Fights Lightweight Grand Prix Semifinal.
Win	38–13	Charles Bennett	Submission (guillotine choke)	Shine Fights 3	September 10, 2010	1	4:25	Newkirk, Oklahoma, United States	2010 Shine Fights Lightweight Grand Prix Quarterfinal.
Win	37–13	Derrick Noble	Technical Submission (rear-naked choke)	Cage Fighting Extreme: Mayhem in Minneapolis	April 24, 2010	2	1:09	Minneapolis, Minnesota, United States	
Loss	36–13	Freddy Sandoval	KO (knee)	Rage In The Cage 133	August 15, 2009	1	0:28	Bernalillo, New Mexico, United States	
Loss	36–12	Kyle Baker	TKO (punches)	Cagefest Xtreme: All In	April 25, 2009	1	1:47	Norfolk, Virginia, United States	
Loss	36–11	Nik Lentz	Decision (unanimous)	Extreme Beatdown at 4 Bears 4	March 21, 2009	3	5:00	New Town, North Dakota, United States	Return to Lightweight.
Loss	36–10	Tyler Stinson	TKO (punches)	C3 Fights	February 28, 2009	1	4:04	Newkirk, Oklahoma, United States	
Loss	36–9	Ferrid Kheder	KO (punches)	C3 Fights: Knockout-Rockout Weekend 1	January 30, 2009	3	2:02	Clinton, Oklahoma, United States	
Win	36–8	Jason MacKay	Submission (triangle choke)	Phoenix Fight Promotions: Wanted	November 29, 2008	1	3:25	Dartmouth, Nova Scotia, Canada	Catchweight (160 lb) bout.
Loss	35–8	Jose Cortez	Decision (split)	Rage in the Cage 117	November 8, 2008	3	5:00	Phoenix, Arizona, United States	Catchweight (175 lb) bout.
Loss	35–7	Jesse Taylor	TKO (punches and elbows)	Total Combat 32	October 2, 2008	1	1:42	El Cajon, California, United States	
Win	35–6	Joe Manzello	Submission (rear-naked choke)	Silver Crown Fights 1	August 8, 2008	1	1:42	Fort Wayne, Indiana, United States	
Loss	34–6	Richard Villes	TKO (punch to the body)	Rage in the Cage 113	August 2, 2008	2	0:34	Albuquerque, New Mexico, United States	
Win	34–5	Jeff Horlacher	Submission (guillotine choke)	Rage in the Cage 111	June 7, 2008	1	2:13	Phoenix, Arizona, United States	
Win	33–5	Lim Jae-suk	Submission (guillotine choke)	Strikeforce: Shamrock vs. Le	March 29, 2008	1	1:14	San Jose, California, United States	
Win	32–5	Mark Weir	Submission (rear-naked choke)	Cage Rage 24	December 1, 2007	1	3:55	London, England	
Win	31–5	Anthony Lapsley	Submission (rear-naked choke)	HDNet Fights 1	October 13, 2007	1	3:55	Dallas, Texas, United States	
Win	30–5	Keita Nakamura	Decision (unanimous)	UFC Fight Night: Stevenson vs. Guillard	April 5, 2007	3	5:00	Las Vegas, Nevada, United States	
Loss	29–5	Karo Parisyan	Decision (unanimous)	UFC Fight Night: Sanchez vs. Riggs	December 13, 2006	3	5:00	San Diego, California, United States	
Win	29–4	Kurt Pellegrino	Submission (rear-naked choke)	UFC 61	July 8, 2006	3	1:20	Las Vegas, Nevada, United States	
Loss	28–4	Joshua Burkman	Submission (guillotine choke)	UFC Ultimate Fight Night 3	January 16, 2006	1	1:07	Las Vegas, Nevada, United States	
Win	28–3	Josh Koscheck	Technical Submission (rear-naked choke)	UFC Ultimate Fight Night 2	October 3, 2005	3	4:28	Las Vegas, Nevada, United States	
Win	27–3	Josh Neer	Technical Submission (rear-naked choke)	UFC Ultimate Fight Night	August 6, 2005	1	1:35	Las Vegas, Nevada, United States	
Win	26–3	Brandon Melendez	Submission (rear-naked choke)	Ring of Fire 17	June 18, 2005	1	2:27	Castle Rock, Colorado, United States	
Win	25–3	Robert Briggs	TKO (corner stoppage)	Night of Champions 1	June 4, 2005	1	3:00	Phoenix, Arizona, United States	
Loss	24–3	Nick Diaz	TKO (punches)	UFC 51	February 5, 2005	1	4:55	Las Vegas, Nevada, United States	
Win	24–2	Nuri Shakir	Submission (rear-naked choke)	Combat Zone 9	December 4, 2004	2	3:26	Revere, Massachusetts, United States	Defended the Combat Zone Welterweight Championship.
Win	23–2	Kenny Florian	Decision (split)	Combat Zone 7	July 10, 2004	3	5:00	Revere, Massachusetts, United States	Won the inaugural Combat Zone Welterweight Championship.
Win	22–2	Kyle Brees	TKO (punches)	Xtreme Cage Fighter 5	May 28, 2004	2	3:41	Phoenix, Arizona, United States	
Win	21–2	Fabio Holanda	Submission (rear-naked choke)	World Freestyle Fighting 6	May 14, 2004	2	0:37	Vancouver, British Columbia, Canada	
Win	20–2	Shaun Beckett	Submission (rear-naked choke)	Rage on the River 2	April 17, 2004	2	1:10	Redding, California, United States	
Win	19–2	Carlo Prater	Submission (guillotine choke)	Rage on the River 2	April 17, 2004	3	2:25	Redding, California, United States	
Win	18–2	Greg Bell	Submission (choke)	Rage in the Cage 56	December 6, 2003	3	2:43	Phoenix, Arizona, United States	
Win	17–2	Dennis Hallman	Decision (split)	KOTC: More Punishment	August 16, 2003	3	5:00	Reno, Nevada, United States	Lightweight bout.
Loss	16–2	Landon Showalter	Submission (triangle choke)	United Full Contact Federation: Summer Slam	July 12, 2003	1	3:00	Rochester, Washington, United States	
Win	16–1	Shaun Beckett	Submission (choke)	Rage in the Cage 49	June 7, 2003	2	2:55	Phoenix, Arizona, United States	
Win	15–1	John Lansing	Decision (unanimous)	Rage in the Cage 43	January 18, 2003	3	3:00	Phoenix, Arizona, United States	
Win	14–1	Edwin Dewees	Decision (unanimous)	Rage in the Cage 36	June 22, 2002	3	3:00	Phoenix, Arizona, United States	
Win	13–1	John Lansing	Submission (armbar)	Rage in the Cage 35	May 3, 2002	2	2:34	Phoenix, Arizona, United States	
Loss	12–1	Edwin Dewees	Decision (split)	Rage in the Cage 34	March 15, 2002	3	3:00	Phoenix, Arizona, United States	Welterweight debut.
Win	12–0	Kimo Stant	Submission (armbar)	Rage in the Cage 23	December 6, 2000	1	1:07	Phoenix, Arizona, United States	
Win	11–0	Maurice Wilson	Submission (rear-naked choke)	Cajan Fights 1	December 2, 2000	1	3:59	Phoenix, Arizona, United States	
Win	10–0	Rock Lima	Submission (choke)	Rage in the Cage: Tucson 5	November 19, 2000	1	0:28	Tucson, Arizona, United States	
Win	9–0	Jerry Parsons	Submission (choke)	Rage in the Cage 22	November 8, 2000	1	2:05	Phoenix, Arizona, United States	
Win	8–0	Cedric Marks	Decision (unanimous)	Absolute Fighter Challenge 1	October 12, 2000	3	5:00	Tempe, Arizona, United States	
Win	7–0	Michael Chavez	TKO (submission to punches)	Rage in the Cage 21	October 4, 2000	1	0:57	Phoenix, Arizona, United States	
Win	6–0	Ryan Brown	KO (punches)	Rage in the Cage: Tucson 4	September 24, 2000	1	1:16	Tucson, Arizona, United States	
Win	5–0	Bill Cameron	Decision (unanimous)	Rage in the Cage 19	July 26, 2000	3	3:00	Phoenix, Arizona, United States	
Win	4–0	Jeff Horlacher	Submission (choke)	Rage in the Cage 18	June 21, 2000	1	1:58	Phoenix, Arizona, United States	
Win	3–0	Owen Phelps	Submission (choke)	Rage in the Cage: Tucson 1	May 27, 2000	2	1:30	Tucson, Arizona, United States	
Win	2–0	Jamie Clark	Submission (choke)	Rage in the Cage 16	April 12, 2000	1	1:30	Phoenix, Arizona, United States	
Win	1–0	Shawn Polso	Decision (unanimous)	Rage in the Cage 4	April 7, 1999	3	3:00	Phoenix, Arizona, United States	Lightweight debut.
