= MFC 29 =

Maximum Fighting Championship MMA event in 2011

MFC 29: Conquer
- The poster for MFC 29: Conquer
- Promotion: Maximum Fighting Championship
- Date: April 8, 2011
- Venue: The Colosseum at Caesars Windsor
- City: Windsor, Ontario

Event chronology
MFC 28: Supremacy	MFC 29: Conquer	MFC 30: Up Close and Personal

MFC 29: Conquer was a mixed martial arts event held by the Maximum Fighting Championship (MFC) on April 8, 2011 at the Colosseum at Caesars Windsor in Windsor, Ontario. The event was broadcast on HDNet.

== Background ==
During the broadcast of MFC 28, owner Mark Pavelich announced that he had signed recently released UFC lightweight fighter Marcus Davis to appear on this card. Davis was expected to fight Kajan Johnson at this card, however Johnson pulled out with an injured shoulder. Davis ended up fighting Curtis Demarce.

MFC 29 is the only MFC event in which all bouts took place in a circular cage instead of their signature ring. This was done in accordance with the regulations utilized in Ontario which requires all mixed martial arts fights to be held in a cage structure. The MFC held a "Name the Cage" fan contest with the winning entry receiving a trip for two to see the show, including premium tickets to the fights, airfare, ground transportation, hotel accommodations, pre-show and after-party. The new MFC cage was named "The Ring".

== Results ==
- Welterweight Championship bout: (Brazil) Douglas Lima vs. (United States) Terry Martin

Lima defeated Martin via TKO (punches) at 1:14 of round 1.

- Light Heavyweight Championship bout: (Canada) Ryan Jimmo vs. (United States) Zak Cummings

Jimmo defeated Cummings via unanimous decision (50–45, 49–46, 50–45).

- Lightweight bout: (United States) Marcus Davis vs. (Canada) Curtis Demarce

Davis defeated Demarce via split decision (28–29, 30–27, 29–28).

- Catchweight (160lb) bout: (United States) Robert Washington vs. (Brazil) Hermes Franca

Franca defeated Washington via TKO (punches) at 0:26 of round 2.

- Welterweight bout: (United States) Demi Deeds vs. (United States) Pete Spratt

Spratt defeated Deeds via submission (armbar) at 4:19 of round 2.

- Middleweight bout: (United States) Andreas Spang vs. (Canada) Ali Mokdad

Mokdad defeated Spang via submission (rear-naked choke) at 1:35 of round 1.

- Welterweight bout: (Brazil) Dhiego Lima vs. (United States) Josh Taveirne

Lima defeated Taveirne via submission (rear-naked choke) at 3:35 of round 3.

- Bantamweight bout: (United States) David Harris vs. (Canada) Chuck Mady

Harris defeated Mady via submission (rear-naked choke) at 3:07 of round 1.

- Lightweight bout: (Canada) Pete Brown vs. (Canada) Matthew Spisak

Spisak defeated Brown via unanimous decision.
