= Josh Neer =

American mixed martial arts fighter

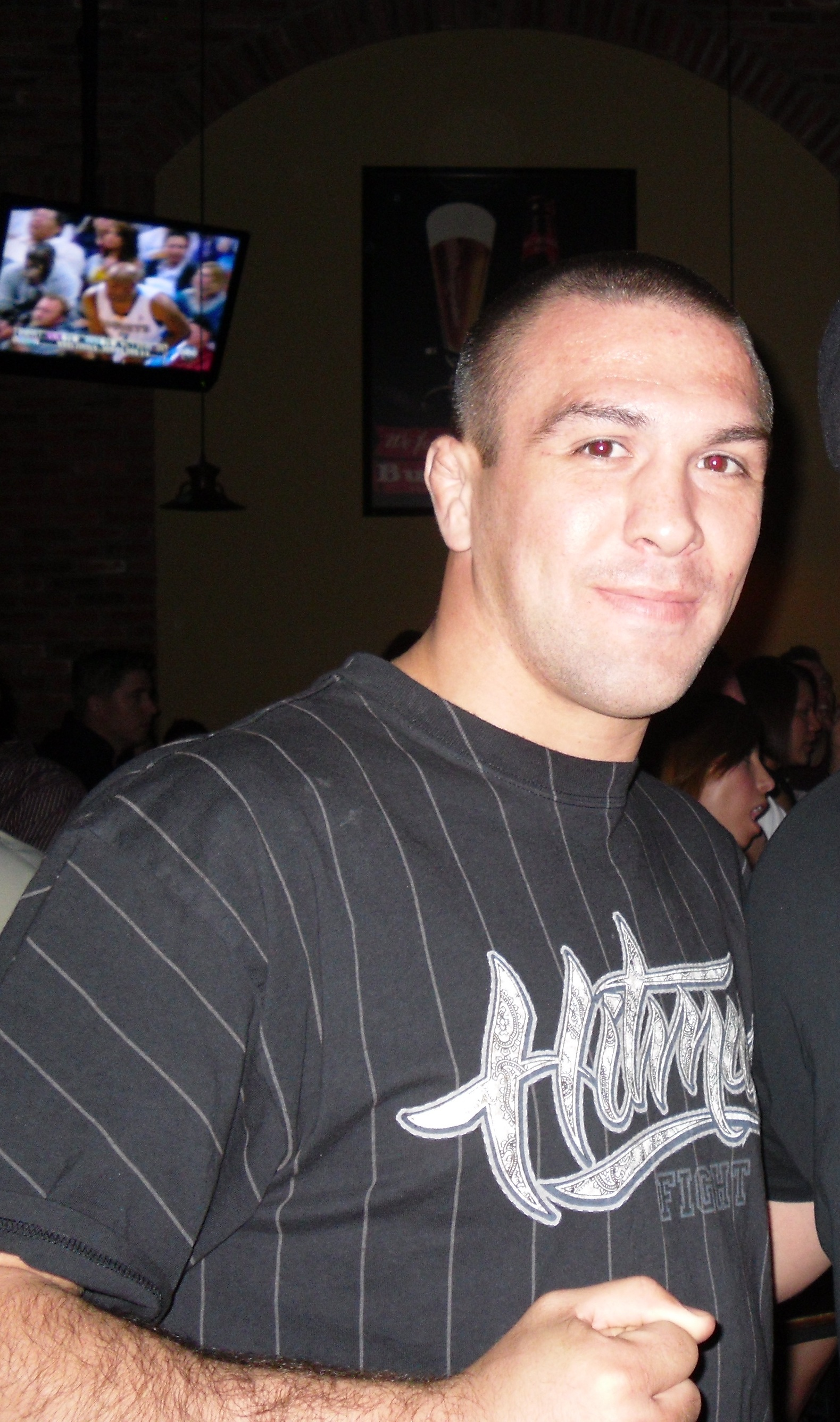
- Neer in May, 2009
- Born: Joshua Martin Neer; March 24, 1983 (age 43); Des Moines, Iowa, United States
- Other names: The Dentist
- Height: 5 ft 11 in (1.80 m)
- Weight: 183.8 lb (83.4 kg; 13.13 st)
- Division: Middleweight; Welterweight; Lightweight
- Reach: 72 in (180 cm)
- Stance: Orthodox
- Team: Miletich Martial Arts (2004–2009); Des Moines MMA (2009–present); Cesar Gracie Jiu-Jitsu (2011–present) elite edge mma 2026 (present)
- Rank: Black belt in Brazilian Jiu-Jitsu
- Years active: 2003–present

Professional boxing record
- Total: 1
- Wins: 1
- By knockout: 1

Mixed martial arts record
- Total: 53
- Wins: 36
- By knockout: 21
- By submission: 11
- By decision: 4
- Losses: 16
- By knockout: 3
- By submission: 5
- By decision: 8
- Draws: 1

Other information
- Website: http://www.joshneer.tv/
- Boxing record from BoxRec
- Mixed martial arts record from Sherdog
- Last updated on: September 29, 2009

Joshua Martin Neer (born March 24, 1983) is an American bare-knuckle boxer and former mixed martial artist. A professional competitor since 2003, he has competed for the UFC, Bellator, the Quad Cities Silverbacks of the IFL, and Shark Fights. Neer is the former Shark Fights Interim Welterweight Champion.

== Background ==
Neer is from Des Moines, Iowa, and began wrestling when he was six years old. In high school, he played football, was an All-Conference baseball player, and in wrestling, he finished fourth in the state for his senior season. Neer continued wrestling at Waldorf College, but got injured and dropped out after only a year. Neer began boxing when he was 18 years old.

== Mixed martial arts career ==
=== Early career ===
Neer went 89–1 as an amateur, sometimes fighting two to three times in one night. He received his nickname "The Dentist", by knocking the teeth out of two consecutive opponents during his amateur career.

Neer began his professional career on March 15, 2003, by knocking out Josh Kennedy. He proceeded to win twice, and draw once, before losing to Spencer "The King" Fisher by split decision. After losing to Fisher, Neer won each of his next ten fights.

=== UFC ===
Neer signed with the UFC and lost his first fight to Drew Fickett by submission at the inaugural UFC Ultimate Fight Night.

Neer fought his next three fights outside the UFC and went 2–1 before going back to the UFC. He submitted Melvin Guillard at Ultimate Fight Night 3 earning the first ever Fight of the Night award, and beat Joe Stevenson, who won the Welterweight division of The Ultimate Fighter 2, at Ultimate Fight Night 4. Neer then lost his next two fights, to Josh Burkman at UFC 61 and by submission to Nick Diaz at UFC 62.

Again out of the UFC, Neer went 6–1 in his next seven fights before returning to defeat Din Thomas at UFC Fight Night: Florian vs Lauzon. He lost to Nate Diaz in the main event at UFC Fight Night: Diaz vs Neer on September 17, 2008. This fight earned him another Fight of the Night award.

He followed that defeat with a win at UFC Fight Night: Lauzon vs Stephens on February 17, 2009 over The Ultimate Fighter: Team Hughes vs Team Serra winner, Mac Danzig, by triangle choke in the second round. This fight earned him another Fight of the Night award.

Neer lost a unanimous decision over Kurt Pellegrino. Throughout the fight Neer made signals that Pellegrino was not doing anything, and was visibly upset at the end of the third round. Neer fought Gleison Tibau as a late replacement for injured Sean Sherk at UFC 104 on October 24, 2009, and lost the fight due to a unanimous decision. Neer was subsequently released from the UFC with a record of 2–3 since his return to the organization.

=== Post-UFC ===
In his first fight following his latest UFC release, Neer defeated Matt Delanoit by TKO at MAX Fights DM Ballroom Brawl IV in Des Moines, Iowa, on January 8. He followed up with another win at Shark Fights 8, winning the Interim Welterweight Championship, which he also successfully defended once.

=== UFC return ===
Neer returned to the UFC to defeat Keith Wisniewski by TKO (cut) at the end of the second round on October 1, 2011, at UFC on Versus 6.

Neer next faced Duane Ludwig on January 20, 2012, at UFC on FX: Guillard vs. Miller. Despite being hurt on several occasions via Ludwig's punches, Neer persevered and won the fight via technical submission in the first round.

Neer faced Mike Pyle on June 8, 2012, at UFC on FX 3. Pyle defeated Neer via first-round knockout.

Neer fought Justin Edwards on October 5, 2012, at UFC on FX 5. He lost the fight via guillotine choke 45 seconds into the first round.

Neer faced Ultimate Fighter Season 11 winner Court McGee on February 23, 2013, at UFC 157. Neer lost the bout via unanimous decision. He was subsequently released from the UFC again after his loss to McGee.

=== Independent circuit ===
On December 14, 2013, Neer faced former UFC veteran Anthony Smith at VFC 41. Neer won via submission (rear-naked choke). Neer then faced Ron Jackson at MCC 54: Grigsby vs. Morrow on June 27, 2014. He won the fight via first round TKO.

=== Bellator ===
At Bellator 17, Neer was defeated by Bellator Lightweight Champion Eddie Alvarez via rear-naked choke at 2:08 in the second round. Alvarez gained control of Neer's back in the standing position. Neer refused to tap, and was rendered unconscious as a result.

Neer returned to the promotion to face Paul Bradley on October 17, 2014, at Bellator 129. He lost the fight by unanimous decision and left frustrated by the repeated ground attack by Bradley.

Neer was scheduled to face Matt Secor at Bellator 140 on July 17, 2015. However, this fight did not happen.

Neer eventually made his return against André Santos at Bellator 146 on November 20, 2015. He lost the fight by unanimous decision.

=== Post-Bellator ===
After the second, two-fight stint in Bellator, Neer faced Anthony Smith in a rematch at VFC 47 on January 14, 2016. He lost the fight via first-round knockout.

== Personal life ==
Neer has a daughter. Before he was fighting professionally, Neer worked in construction.

On New Year's Eve 2008 Neer was involved in a high-speed chase with law enforcement in Des Moines, Iowa, after reportedly hitting a squad car before fleeing the scene. He faced charges of operating a vehicle while intoxicated, eluding police, hit-and-run, and various other traffic violations. He pleaded guilty to two charges and did not receive jail time but instead received a suspended sentence.

== Bare-knuckle boxing ==
Neer competed in a bare-knuckle boxing match at 200 lbs. for the World Bare Knuckle Fighting Federation on November 9, 2018. He won after his opponent retired two minutes into the third round.

== Championships and accomplishments ==
- Ultimate Fighting Championship
  - Fight of the Night (Three times) vs. Melvin Guillard, Nate Diaz and Mac Danzig
  - UFC Encyclopedia Awards
    - Fight of the Night (One time) vs. Joe Stevenson
  - UFC.com Awards
    - 2006: Submission of the Year vs. Melvin Guillard
    - 2008: Ranked #8 Fight of the Year vs. Nate Diaz
- Shark Fights
  - Shark Fights Interim Welterweight Championship (One time)
    - One successful title defense
- Victory Fighting Championship
  - VFC Welterweight Championship (One time)

== Mixed martial arts record ==
Professional record breakdown
55 matches	36 wins	18 losses
By knockout	21	3
By submission	11	5
By decision	4	10
Draws	1	

Res.	Record	Opponent	Method	Event	Date	Round	Time	Location	Notes
Loss	36–16–1	Anthony Smith	TKO (elbows)	VFC 47	January 14, 2016	1	3:27	Omaha, Nebraska, United States	Middleweight debut.
Loss	36–15–1	André Santos	Decision (unanimous)	Bellator 146	November 20, 2015	3	5:00	Thackerville, Oklahoma, United States	
Loss	36–14–1	Paul Bradley	Decision (unanimous)	Bellator 129	October 17, 2014	3	5:00	Council Bluffs, Iowa, United States	
Win	36–13–1	Travis Coyle	Submission (armbar)	VFC 43	August 2, 2014	1	1:37	Ralston, Nebraska, United States	Won the vacant VFC Welterweight Championship.
Win	35–13–1	Ron Jackson	TKO (punches)	MCC 54: Grigsby vs. Morrow	June 27, 2014	1	4:20	Des Moines, Iowa, United States	180 lb. Catchweight bout.
Win	34–13–1	Anthony Smith	Submission (rear-naked choke)	VFC 41	December 14, 2013	3	3:48	Ralston, Nebraska, United States	175 lb. Catchweight bout.
Loss	33–13–1	Court McGee	Decision (unanimous)	UFC 157	February 23, 2013	3	5:00	Anaheim, California, United States	
Loss	33–12–1	Justin Edwards	Technical Submission (guillotine choke)	UFC on FX: Browne vs. Bigfoot	October 5, 2012	1	0:45	Minneapolis, Minnesota, United States	
Loss	33–11–1	Mike Pyle	KO (punch)	UFC on FX: Johnson vs. McCall	June 8, 2012	1	4:56	Sunrise, Florida, United States	
Win	33–10–1	Duane Ludwig	Technical Submission (guillotine choke)	UFC on FX: Guillard vs. Miller	January 20, 2012	1	3:04	Nashville, Tennessee, United States	
Win	32–10–1	Keith Wisniewski	TKO (doctor stoppage)	UFC Live: Cruz vs. Johnson	October 1, 2011	2	5:00	Washington, D.C., United States	
Win	31–10–1	Blas Avena	TKO (punches and elbows)	Superior Cage Combat 2	August 20, 2011	1	2:54	Las Vegas, Nevada, United States	
Win	30–10–1	Jesse Juarez	TKO (doctor stoppage)	Shark Fights 16: Neer vs. Juarez	June 25, 2011	1	4:57	Odessa, Texas, United States	Defended the interim Shark Fights Welterweight Championship.
Win	29–10–1	Andre Kase	TKO (punches)	WWFC 2: Neer vs. Kase	April 9, 2011	1	0:20	Clive, Iowa, United States	
Win	28–10–1	Jesse Finney	Submission (guillotine choke)	Fight Me MMA 1: The Battle Begins	August 14, 2010	1	4:09	St. Louis, Missouri, United States	175 lb. Catchweight bout.
Loss	27–10–1	Eddie Alvarez	Technical Submission (standing rear-naked choke)	Bellator 17	May 6, 2010	2	2:08	Boston, Massachusetts, United States	160 lb. Catchweight bout.
Win	27–9–1	Anselmo Martinez	Submission (rear-naked choke)	Shark Fights 8: Super Brawl	February 5, 2010	1	3:05	Lubbock, Texas, United States	Won the interim Shark Fights Welterweight Championship.
Win	26–9–1	Matt Delanoit	KO (punches)	Max Fights DM: Ballroom Brawl 4	January 8, 2010	1	3:48	Des Moines, Iowa, United States	Return to Welterweight.
Loss	25–9–1	Gleison Tibau	Decision (unanimous)	UFC 104	October 24, 2009	3	5:00	Los Angeles, California, United States	157 lb. Catchweight bout.
Loss	25–8–1	Kurt Pellegrino	Decision (unanimous)	UFC 101	August 8, 2009	3	5:00	Philadelphia, Pennsylvania, United States	
Win	25–7–1	Mac Danzig	Submission (triangle choke)	UFC Fight Night: Lauzon vs. Stephens	February 7, 2009	2	3:36	Tampa, Florida, United States	Fight of the Night.
Loss	24–7–1	Nate Diaz	Decision (split)	UFC Fight Night: Diaz vs Neer	September 17, 2008	3	5:00	Omaha, Nebraska, United States	Fight of the Night.
Win	24–6–1	Din Thomas	Decision (unanimous)	UFC Fight Night: Florian vs. Lauzon	April 2, 2008	3	5:00	Broomfield, Colorado, United States	Lightweight debut.
Win	23–6–1	Nick Sorg	Submission (armbar)	C3: Smokey Mountain Showdown	October 27, 2007	1	2:16	Cherokee, North Carolina, United States	
Win	22–6–1	Paul Rodriguez	TKO (punches)	Greensparks: Full Contact Fighting 5	July 27, 2007	1	1:39	Des Moines, Iowa, United States	
Loss	21–6–1	Mark Miller	KO (punch)	IFL: Chicago	May 19, 2007	1	0:54	Chicago, Illinois, United States	
Win	21–5–1	Tyson Burris	TKO (submission to punches)	FSG: Coliseum Carnage	April 8, 2007	1	2:31	Ames, Iowa, United States	
Win	20–5–1	Mark Gearhart	TKO (punches)	Greensparks: Full Contact Fighting 3	March 17, 2007	1	0:21	Iowa, United States	
Win	19–5–1	TJ Waldburger	TKO (punches)	IFC: Road to Global Domination	March 4, 2007	1	0:24	Belton, Texas, United States	
Win	18–5–1	Wayne Hajicek	TKO (submission to punches)	MCC 5: Thanksgiving Throwdown	November 22, 2006	1	2:30	Des Moines, Iowa, United States	
Loss	17–5–1	Nick Diaz	Submission (kimura)	UFC 62: Liddell vs. Sobral	August 26, 2006	3	1:42	Las Vegas, Nevada, United States	
Loss	17–4–1	Josh Burkman	Decision (unanimous)	UFC 61: Bitter Rivals	July 8, 2006	3	5:00	Las Vegas, Nevada, United States	
Win	17–3–1	Joe Stevenson	Decision (unanimous)	UFC Fight Night 4	April 6, 2006	3	5:00	Las Vegas, Nevada, United States	
Win	16–3–1	Melvin Guillard	Submission (triangle choke)	UFC Fight Night 3	January 16, 2006	1	4:20	Las Vegas, Nevada, United States	Fight of the Night. Submission of the Year.
Win	15–3–1	Alex Carter	TKO (punches)	XKK: Des Moines	November 23, 2005	1	3:43	Des Moines, Iowa, United States	
Loss	14–3–1	Nick Thompson	Submission (rear-naked choke)	Extreme Challenge 64	October 15, 2005	2	2:19	Osceola, Iowa, United States	
Win	14–2–1	Forrest Petz	Submission (triangle choke)	FFC 15: Fiesta Las Vegas	September 14, 2005	1	3:25	Las Vegas, Nevada, United States	
Loss	13–2–1	Drew Fickett	Technical Submission (rear-naked choke)	UFC Ultimate Fight Night	August 6, 2005	1	1:35	Las Vegas, Nevada, United States	
Win	13–1–1	Todd Kiser	TKO (submission to punches)	Extreme Challenge 62	June 18, 2005	1	1:41	Council Bluffs, Iowa, United States	
Win	12–1–1	Mark Long	KO (punch)	XKK: Des Moines	May 20, 2005	1	0:54	Des Moines, Iowa, United States	
Win	11–1–1	Jay Jack	Decision (unanimous)	Extreme Challenge 61	April 22, 2005	3	5:00	Medina, Minnesota, United States	
Win	10–1–1	Derrick Noble	Submission (triangle choke)	XKK: Des Moines	March 19, 2005	1	3:22	Des Moines, Iowa, United States	
Win	9–1–1	Terrance Reasby	TKO (punches)	Downtown Destruction 2	February 2, 2005	2	0:52	Des Moines, Iowa, United States	
Win	8–1–1	Mark Bear	KO (knees)	VFC 8: Fallout	November 27, 2004	3	3:40	Council Bluffs, Iowa, United States	
Win	7–1–1	David Gardner	TKO (punches)	XKK: Des Moines	October 30, 2004	1	1:55	Des Moines, Iowa, United States	
Win	6–1–1	Anthony Macias	TKO (punches)	FFC 11: Explosion	September 10, 2004	1	0:41	Biloxi, Mississippi, United States	
Win	5–1–1	Fred Leavy	TKO (punches)	Xtreme Kage Kombat	August 7, 2004	1	3:44	Des Moines, Iowa, United States	
Win	4–1–1	Kyle Jensen	Submission (armbar)	Extreme Challenge 57	May 6, 2004	3	1:04	Council Bluffs, Iowa, United States	
Loss	3–1–1	Spencer Fisher	Decision (split)	VFC 7: Showdown	March 6, 2004	5	5:00	Council Bluffs, Iowa, United States	
Win	3–0–1	Joe Chacon	Decision (unanimous)	XKK: Clash in Curtiss 4	February 7, 2004	3	3:00	Curtiss, Wisconsin, United States	
Draw	2–0–1	Joe Jordan	Draw	AFA: Judgment Night	January 17, 2004	3	3:00	Fort Dodge, Iowa, United States	
Win	2–0	Royce Louck	TKO (punches)	Absolute Ada Fights 4	September 13, 2003	1	1:43	Ada, Minnesota, United States	
Win	1–0	Josh Kennedy	KO (slam)	Gladiators 20	March 15, 2003	1	3:41	Des Moines, Iowa, United States	

== Professional boxing record ==
1 fight	1 win	0 losses
By knockout	1	0
By decision	0	0

No.	Result	Record	Opponent	Method	Round, time	Date	Location	Notes
1	Win	1–0	(United States) Ron Krull	TKO	1 (4), 2:09	Dec 17, 2004	(United States) Clive, Iowa, U.S.	

== Bare knuckle record ==
Professional record breakdown
1 match	1 win	0 losses
By knockout	1	0

Res.	Record	Opponent	Method	Event	Date	Round	Time	Location	Notes
Win	1–0	Mike Alderete	TKO (retirement)	World Bare Knuckle Fighting Federation	November 9, 2018	3	2:00	Casper, Wyoming, United States	

== See also ==
- List of Bellator MMA alumni
- List of mixed martial artists with professional boxing records
- List of male mixed martial artists
