= Matt Grice =

American mixed martial artist

- Born: July 29, 1981 (age 45); Midwest City, Oklahoma, United States
- Other names: The Real One
- Height: 5 ft 8 in (1.73 m)
- Weight: 145 lb (66 kg; 10.4 st)
- Division: Lightweight; Featherweight
- Reach: 70 in (180 cm)
- Stance: Orthodox
- Fighting out of: Oklahoma City, Oklahoma, United States
- Team: R-1 MMA Training Center
- Rank: NCAA Division I Wrestling; Brown belt in Brazilian Jiu Jitsu
- Years active: 2005–2013

Mixed martial arts record
- Total: 20
- Wins: 15
- By knockout: 6
- By submission: 4
- By decision: 5
- Losses: 5
- By knockout: 2
- By submission: 2
- By decision: 1

Other information
- Mixed martial arts record from Sherdog

Matt Grice (born July 29, 1981) is an American retired mixed martial artist. He was in the Ultimate Fighting Championship, fighting in the featherweight division before suffering a traumatic brain injury in a traffic accident in Shawnee, Oklahoma on September 8, 2013. Grice returned to his old job with the Oklahoma City Police Department in October 2014.

== Wrestling ==
At Harrah High school, Grice was a 4-time Oklahoma State Wrestling Champion, winning Outstanding Wrestler 3 times, a feat which has never been accomplished by any other competitor. After his senior season, Grice was the most highly recruited wrestler in the nation at his weight. He chose the University of Oklahoma to attend college. The 2000-2001 season Grice was redshirted after suffering an elbow injury that required surgery, keeping him out of action for the season. Grice again was redshirted in the 2001-2002 season after a serious auto accident, during which he went through a windshield and required 12 surgeries. Grice graduated from Oklahoma with a bachelor's degree in sociology.

== Mixed martial arts career ==
=== Early career ===
After graduating from college and giving up on his wrestling career, Grice decided to start in MMA. Grice started his professional career in 2005, winning nine straight fights between 2005 and 2007 before getting a call to compete in the UFC.

=== Ultimate Fighting Championship ===
Grice made his UFC debut at UFC 70 on April 21, 2007 against Terry Etim. The card took place in Manchester, England. Grice lost the fight via submission (guillotine choke) in the first round.

He had his second UFC outing at UFC 77 on October 20, 2007 against Jason Black. Grice won the fight via split decision. After his win over Black, Grice took two years to attend and graduate from the Oklahoma City Police Department Academy where he is currently an officer.

On February 7, 2009 Grice returned to fighting to fight Matt Veach at UFC Fight Night 17 in Tampa, Florida. Grice lost the fight via TKO in the first round.

Grice competed on the UFC's 100th PPV show, UFC 100, that took place July 11, 2009. He fought Shannon Gugerty and lost via first round submission. After a 1-3 record in the UFC, he was released from the promotion.

=== Return to the UFC ===
After going 4-0 outside the UFC, Grice dropped to featherweight in his return fight against Ricardo Lamas on June 26, 2011 at UFC on Versus 4. He lost via first round TKO to Lamas with a head kick and punches.

Grice was scheduled to face Josh Grispi on October 6, 2011 at UFC 136. However, Grispi was forced out of the bout with an injury and replaced by Nam Phan. Then Grice himself was forced out with an injury and replaced by Leonard Garcia.

Grice next faced Leonard Garcia on June 8, 2012 at UFC on FX 3, who he defeated via unanimous decision (30-27, 30-27, 30-27).

Grice faced Dennis Bermudez on February 23, 2013 at UFC 157. Grice lost to Bermudez by split decision. The back and forth action earned both fighters Fight of the Night honors and much praise from MMA observers.

Grice was expected to face Jeremy Larsen on October 19, 2013 at UFC 166. However, Grice was forced out of the bout after sustaining serious injuries in a September 8 car accident in his home state of Oklahoma.

== Championships & accomplishments ==
- Ultimate Fighting Championship
  - Fight of the Night (Two times)
  - UFC.com Awards
    - 2007: Ranked #10 Fight of the Year vs. Jason Black (Tied with Tyson Griffin vs. Clay Guida)
    - 2013: Ranked #6 Fight of the Year vs. Dennis Bermudez

== Personal life ==
Matt is married and has two daughters.

On April 4 Matt's home town, Harrah, Oklahoma, celebrates the annual Matt Grice Day.

Matt is active coaching today and is the head MMA coach at American Elite MMA in Edmond, Oklahoma.

== Mixed martial arts record ==
Professional record breakdown
20 matches	15 wins	5 losses
By knockout	6	2
By submission	4	2
By decision	5	1

Res.	Record	Opponent	Method	Event	Date	Round	Time	Location	Notes
Loss	15–5	Dennis Bermudez	Decision (split)	UFC 157	February 23, 2013	3	5:00	Anaheim, California, United States	Fight of the Night.
Win	15–4	Leonard Garcia	Decision (unanimous)	UFC on FX: Johnson vs. McCall	June 8, 2012	3	5:00	Sunrise, Florida, United States	
Loss	14–4	Ricardo Lamas	TKO (head kick and punches)	UFC Live: Kongo vs. Barry	June 26, 2011	1	4:41	Pittsburgh, Pennsylvania, United States	Featherweight debut.
Win	14–3	David Gardner	Decision (unanimous)	FCF 46	April 9, 2011	3	5:00	Shawnee, Oklahoma, United States	
Win	13–3	Thomas Schulte	Submission (punches)	FCF 44	September 25, 2010	1	4:31	Shawnee, Oklahoma, United States	
Win	12–3	Rocky McAnally	Submission (guillotine choke)	FCF 43	June 12, 2010	1	3:01	Shawnee, Oklahoma, United States	
Win	11–3	Steve Schneider	Submission (punches)	Bricktown Brawl 4	April 2, 2010	1	1:40	Oklahoma City, Oklahoma, United States	
Loss	10–3	Shannon Gugerty	Submission (guillotine choke)	UFC 100	July 11, 2009	1	2:36	Las Vegas, Nevada, United States	
Loss	10–2	Matt Veach	TKO (punches)	UFC Fight Night: Lauzon vs. Stephens	February 7, 2009	1	4:34	Tampa, Florida, United States	
Win	10–1	Jason Black	Decision (split)	UFC 77	October 20, 2007	3	5:00	Columbus, Ohio, United States	Fight of the Night.
Loss	9–1	Terry Etim	Technical Submission (guillotine choke)	UFC 70	April 21, 2007	1	4:38	Manchester, England	
Win	9–0	Clint Kerley	TKO (punches)	Freestyle Cage Fighting	January 20, 2007	1	1:08	Shawnee, Oklahoma, United States	
Win	8–0	Jason Anderson	KO (head kick)	Freestyle Cage Fighting	November 4, 2006	1	0:15	Shawnee, Oklahoma, United States	
Win	7–0	Dan Marks	Decision (unanimous)	Extreme Wars 3: Bay Area Brawl	June 3, 2006	3	5:00	Oakland, California, United States	
Win	6–0	Lee King	Submission	Ultimate Texas Showdown 5	April 29, 2006	1	1:46	Dallas, Texas, United States	
Win	5–0	Joe Davis	TKO (punches)	ACF: Showdown at Sundown	March 10, 2006	1	0:49	Stillwater, Oklahoma, United States	
Win	4–0	Shervin Alavi	Decision (unanimous)	Ultimate Texas Showdown 4	February 25, 2006	3	5:00	Dallas, Texas, United States	
Win	3–0	Rocky Long	TKO (punches)	Ultimate Texas Showdown 3	November 26, 2005	1	1:00	Dallas, Texas, United States	
Win	2–0	Marco Adamballi	KO (punch)	XFC - Xtreme Fight Championship 4	November 5, 2005	1	N/A	Fort Smith, Arkansas, United States	
Win	1–0	Matt Grey	KO (punch)	EK: Extreme Fighting	October 1, 2005	1	1:21	Norman, Oklahoma, United States	

== See also ==
- List of current UFC fighters
- List of male mixed martial artists
