= Jason Black =

American mixed martial arts fighter

- Born: Jason Douglas Black; August 15, 1972 (age 54); Ottumwa, Iowa, U.S.
- Other names: The Black Legion
- Height: 5 ft 10 in (1.78 m)
- Weight: 155 lb (70 kg; 11.1 st)
- Division: Welterweight; Lightweight
- Fighting out of: Davenport, Iowa, U.S.
- Team: Miletich Martial Arts
- Rank: Black belt in Brazilian jiu-jitsu Third degree black belt in Tae Kwon Do
- Years active: 2000–2007

Mixed martial arts record
- Total: 28
- Wins: 23
- By knockout: 5
- By submission: 10
- By decision: 4
- Unknown: 4
- Losses: 4
- By knockout: 1
- By submission: 2
- By decision: 1
- Draws: 1

Other information
- Mixed martial arts record from Sherdog

Jason Douglas Black (born August 15, 1972) is an American retired mixed martial artist. A professional from 2000 until 2007, he fought in the UFC, PRIDE Fighting Championships, King of the Cage, and the World Fighting Alliance.

== Background ==
Black was born in Ottumwa, Iowa and began wrestling when he was in the third grade. He moved to Bettendorf, Iowa and then began making the transition to mixed martial arts.

== Mixed martial arts career ==
=== Early career ===
After a 3-0 amateur career at 185 lbs, Black turned professional in 2000. He soon accumulated a record of 12-0 in small organizations such as SuperBrawl in Hawaii, Extreme Challenge, and HOOKnSHOOT with many of the wins coming in the first round. Black then fought future MFC Lightweight Champion Antonio McKee at World Fighting Alliance 1. The two fought to a draw.

Black continued his dominance, holding a record of 21-0-1 with wins over Ivan Menjivar, John Alessio, and Keith Wisniewski, before making his King of the Cage debut. Black fought against former WEC Welterweight Champion Shonie Carter and was given his first professional loss via TKO due to punches and to this date is the only TKO or KO loss of Black's career. Black then fought for Japan's PRIDE organization before being given a UFC contract.

=== Ultimate Fighting Championship ===
Black made his debut with the Ultimate Fighting Championship at UFC Fight Night 10, losing to Thiago Tavares by triangle choke. He then lost at UFC 77 to Matt Grice by split decision after a very close fight that was originally ruled a draw when the score was incorrectly read. Black subsequently retired following the defeat.

== Personal life ==
Black is married and has two children.

== Championships and accomplishments ==
- Ultimate Fighting Championship
  - Fight of the Night (One time) vs. Matt Grice
  - UFC.com Awards
    - 2007: Ranked #10 Fight of the Year vs. Matt Grice (Tied with Tyson Griffin vs. Clay Guida)

== Mixed martial arts record ==
Professional record breakdown
28 matches	23 wins	4 losses
By knockout	5	1
By submission	10	2
By decision	4	1
Unknown	4	0
Draws	1	

Res.	Record	Opponent	Method	Event	Date	Round	Time	Location	Notes
Loss	23–4–1	Matt Grice	Decision (split)	UFC 77	October 20, 2007	3	5:00	Cincinnati, Ohio, United States	Fight of the Night.
Loss	23–3–1	Thiago Tavares	Submission (triangle choke)	UFC Fight Night: Stout vs. Fisher	June 12, 2007	2	2:49	Hollywood, Florida, United States	
Win	23–2–1	Sam Jackson	Submission (choke)	EC 74: Extreme Challenge 74	March 10, 2007	N/A	N/A	Iowa City, Iowa, United States	
Loss	22–2–1	Shinya Aoki	Submission (triangle choke)	PRIDE Bushido 12	August 26, 2006	1	1:58	Nagoya, Aichi, Japan	
Win	22–1–1	Jin Eoh	TKO (corner stoppage)	PRIDE Bushido 11	June 4, 2006	1	4:25	Saitama, Japan	Lightweight debut.
Loss	21–1–1	Shonie Carter	TKO (punches)	KOTC: Redemption on the River	February 17, 2006	1	1:18	Moline, Illinois, United States	
Win	21–0–1	Kyle Jensen	Submission (triangle choke)	EC 64: Extreme Challenge 64	October 15, 2005	1	1:15	Osceola, Iowa, United States	
Win	20–0–1	Keith Wisniewski	Decision (unanimous)	XKK: Xtreme Kage Kombat	August 7, 2004	3	5:00	Des Moines, Iowa, United States	
Win	19–0–1	Gideon Ray	Decision (unanimous)	IHC 7: The Crucible	June 5, 2004	3	5:00	Hammond, Indiana, United States	
Win	18–0–1	Marcel Perigold	Submission (armbar)	EC 53: Extreme Challenge 53	September 13, 2003	1	1:08	Iowa City, Iowa, United States	
Win	17–0–1	Michael Johnston	Submission (north-south choke)	EF 1: Genesis	July 13, 2003	1	1:35	London, England	
Win	16–0–1	John Alessio	Decision (split)	UCC 12: Adrenaline	January 25, 2003	3	5:00	Montreal, Quebec, Canada	
Win	15–0–1	Chad W. Saunders	TKO (retirement)	WFA 3: Level 3	November 23, 2002	2	5:00	Las Vegas, Nevada, United States	
Win	14–0–1	Ivan Menjivar	Submission (rear-naked choke)	UCC 8: Fast and Furious	March 30, 2002	1	3:33	Rimouski, Quebec, Canada	
Win	13–0–1	James Meals	TKO (punches)	EC 46: Extreme Challenge 46	February 16, 2002	1	1:44	Clive, Iowa, United States	
Draw	12–0–1	Antonio McKee	Draw (split)	World Fighting Alliance 1	November 3, 2001	3	5:00	Las Vegas, Nevada, United States	
Win	12–0	Jeremiah Billington	Submission (arm-triangle choke)	IC 3: Iowa Challenge 3	September 22, 2001	2	0:45	Waterloo, Iowa, United States	
Win	11–0	Cedric Marks	TKO (submission to elbows)	EC 42: Extreme Challenge 42	August 24, 2001	1	3:03	Davenport, Iowa, United States	
Win	10–0	John Cronk	TKO (punches)	IC 2: Iowa Challenge 2	August 11, 2001	2	3:11	Cedar Rapids, Iowa, United States	
Win	9–0	Eddie Miller	Submission (guillotine choke)	HOOKnSHOOT: Masters	May 26, 2001	1	0:19	Evansville, Indiana, United States	
Win	8–0	Jake Hudson	TKO (submission to punches)	Gladiators 14: Gladiators 14	May 11, 2001	1	N/A	Omaha, Nebraska, United States	
Win	7–0	Jeremy Bennett	Submission (guillotine choke)	Superbrawl: Futurebrawl 2000	November 14, 2000	1	3:23	Honolulu, Hawaii, United States	
Win	6–0	Brian Anthony Fulton	Submission (arm-triangle choke)	EC 36: Extreme Challenge 36	August 26, 2000	1	6:35	Davenport, Iowa, United States	
Win	5–0	Bobby Clayton	N/A	Gladiators 8: Gladiators 8	July 22, 2000	N/A	N/A	United States	
Win	4–0	Don Hamilton	N/A	Gladiators 8: Gladiators 8	July 22, 2000	N/A	N/A	United States	
Win	3–0	Don Hamilton	N/A	Gladiators 7: Gladiators 7	July 14, 2000	N/A	N/A	United States	
Win	2–0	Bobby Clayton	N/A	Gladiators 7: Gladiators 7	July 14, 2000	N/A	N/A	United States	
Win	1–0	Steve Berger	Decision (split)	EC 32: Extreme Challenge 32	May 21, 2000	1	15:00	Springfield, Illinois, United States	
