= UFC 77 =

UFC mixed martial arts event in 2007

UFC 77: Hostile Territory
- The poster for UFC 77: Hostile Territory
- Promotion: Ultimate Fighting Championship
- Date: October 20, 2007
- Venue: U.S. Bank Arena
- City: Cincinnati, Ohio
- Attendance: 16,054
- Total gate: $2,540,000
- Buyrate: 325,000

Event chronology
UFC 76: Knockout	UFC 77: Hostile Territory	UFC 78: Validation

UFC 77: Hostile Territory was a mixed martial arts event held by the Ultimate Fighting Championship (UFC). The event took place on Saturday, October 20, 2007, at the U.S. Bank Arena in Cincinnati, Ohio.

== Background ==
The main event featured Anderson Silva defending his Middleweight Championship against Cincinnati native and former champion Rich Franklin in a rematch of their October 2006 meeting at UFC 64, which Silva won by technical knockout. The name "Hostile Territory" came from the defense of Anderson Silva's UFC middleweight title against Cincinnati native Rich Franklin.

The co-main event was a heavyweight match-up between former two-time Heavyweight Champion Tim Sylvia and undefeated Brandon Vera.

Before the Vera vs. Sylvia fight, former amateur wrestler and WWE wrestler Brock Lesnar announced he had signed with the UFC.

The scores for the Black vs. Grice match were initially announced as 29–28 for Black, 29–28 for Grice, and 28–28, and the bout was ruled a split draw. An announcement was then made in the arena that the scores had been miscalculated and Grice was awarded the victory.

== Results ==
Main card (PPV)
Weight class				Method	Round	Time	Notes
Middleweight	Anderson Silva (c)	def.	Rich Franklin	TKO (knees)	2	1:07	(Note: For the UFC Middleweight Championship.)
Heavyweight	Tim Sylvia	def.	Brandon Vera	Decision (unanimous) (29–27, 29–28, 29–28)	3	5:00
Lightweight	Alvin Robinson	def.	Jorge Gurgel	Decision (unanimous) (29–28, 29–27, 29–27)	3	5:00
Light Heavyweight	Stephan Bonnar	def.	Eric Schafer	TKO (punches)	2	2:47
Middleweight	Alan Belcher	def.	Kalib Starnes	TKO (doctor stoppage)	2	1:39
Preliminary card
Middleweight	Yushin Okami	def.	Jason MacDonald	Decision (unanimous) (30–27, 30–27, 30–27)	3	5:00
Middleweight	Demian Maia	def.	Ryan Jensen	Submission (rear-naked choke)	1	2:40	(Note: This bout aired on the PPV broadcast following the Silva vs. Franklin fight.)
Welterweight	Josh Burkman	def.	Forrest Petz	Decision (split) (29–28, 29–28, 28–29)	3	5:00
Lightweight	Matt Grice	def.	Jason Black	Decision (split) (28–29, 29–28, 29–28)	3	5:00

== Bonus awards ==
The following fighters received $40,000 bonuses.

- Fight of the Night: Matt Grice vs. Jason Black
- Knockout of the Night: Anderson Silva
- Submission of the Night: Demian Maia

== See also ==
- Ultimate Fighting Championship
- List of UFC champions
- List of UFC events
- 2007 in UFC
