= Eric Schafer =

American mixed martial arts (MMA) fighter

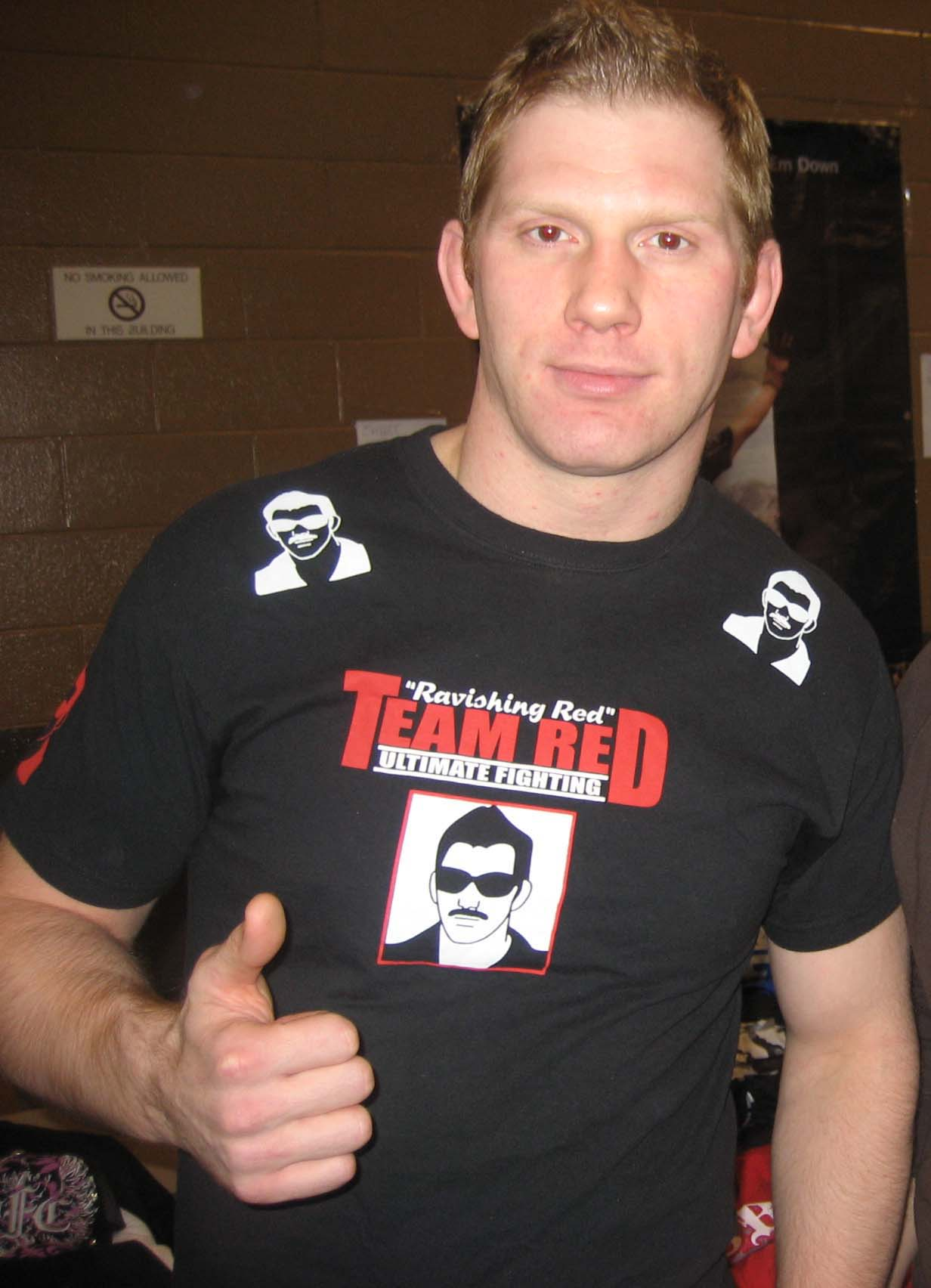
- Born: Eric John Schafer; September 20, 1977 (age 49); Fond du Lac, Wisconsin, United States
- Other names: Red
- Height: 6 ft 3 in (1.91 m)
- Weight: 185 lb (84 kg; 13.2 st)
- Division: Light Heavyweight; Middleweight
- Reach: 76.0 in (193 cm)
- Fighting out of: Milwaukee, Wisconsin, United States
- Rank: Third degree black belt in Brazilian Jiu-Jitsu under Pedro Sauer
- Years active: 1998–2016 (MMA)

Mixed martial arts record
- Total: 25
- Wins: 15
- By knockout: 3
- By submission: 10
- By decision: 1
- Unknown: 1
- Losses: 8
- By knockout: 4
- By submission: 1
- By decision: 3
- Draws: 2

Other information
- University: University of Wisconsin-Oshkosh
- Notable school: Fond Du Lac High School
- Website: https://www.redschafer.com/
- Mixed martial arts record from Sherdog
- Last updated on: October 22, 2009

Eric John Schafer (born September 20, 1977) is a retired American mixed martial artist. A professional from 1997 until 2016, he competed for the UFC.

== Background ==
Schafer attended the University of Wisconsin–Oshkosh.

Schafer is a black belt in Brazilian Jiu-Jitsu under Pedro Sauer.

== Mixed martial arts career ==
=== Early career ===
Schafer compiled an amateur record of 2–1 before making his professional MMA debut in 1998. He then amassed a record of 6-1-2 before being signed by the UFC.

=== Ultimate Fighting Championship ===
He made his UFC debut at UFC 62, defeating Rob MacDonald by arm-triangle choke, rendering him unconscious at the 2:26 mark of round one.

Schafer then lost his next 2 bouts consecutively via TKO to Michael Bisping at UFC 66 and Stephan Bonnar at UFC 77.

Schafer next defeated Houston Alexander by arm-triangle choke in the first round on September 17, 2008, at UFC Fight Night: Diaz vs Neer.

Schafer won via TKO over Antonio Mendes at UFC 93 on January 7, 2009.

He lost to Ryan Bader by unanimous decision (30–27, 29–26, and 30–27) on October 24, 2009, on the undercard of UFC 104.

Schafer was defeated by Jason Brilz via unanimous decision on March 21, 2010, at UFC Live: Vera vs. Jones. After this bout he was released from the promotion.

=== Post UFC ===
In his first fight since being released from the UFC and his first fight at Middleweight Schafer defeated Chris Albandia via submission (triangle choke) in the first round at XFO 41 - Outdoor War 7 on September 3, 2011.

=== Return to the UFC ===
Schafer returned to the UFC in a Middleweight bout against Aaron Simpson at UFC 136 on October 8, 2011, and lost a unanimous decision.

Schafer next faced Jorge Rivera on January 20, 2012, at UFC on FX 1. He lost the fight via TKO in the second round. He was released from the promotion for the third time following this loss.

=== Independent promotions ===
After being released from the UFC, Schafer faced John Poppie at Madtown Throwdown 29: Unstoppable on January 5, 2013. He won via second round TKO.

He then fought Eric Hammerich for Chosen Few FC 6, in Madison Wisconsin on 09/19/15. He would win by choke in 2:38 of the first round.

His next fight would be his retirement fight against James Austen Heidlage for Choose Few FC 8, in Madison Wisconsin on 04/16/16. Eric would lose by referee stoppage at 3:01 of the second round.

== Championships and accomplishments ==
- Gladiators Fighting Series
  - GFS Light Heavyweight Championship (One time)
- Xtreme Fighting Organization
  - XFO Light Heavyweight Championship (One time)

== Mixed martial arts record ==
Professional record breakdown
24 matches	14 wins	8 losses
By knockout	3	4
By submission	9	1
By decision	1	3
Unknown	1	0
Draws	2	

Res.	Record	Opponent	Method	Event	Date	Round	Time	Location	Notes
Loss	15–8–2	James Austen Heidlage	TKO (referee stoppage)	Chosen Few FC 8	April 4, 2016	2	3:01	Madison, Wisconsin, United States	
Win	15–7–2	Eric Hammerich	Submission (choke)	Chosen Few FC 6	September 9, 2015	1	4:07	Madison, Wisconsin, United States	
Win	14–7–2	John Poppie	TKO (punches)	Madtown Throwdown 29: Unstoppable	January 5, 2013	1	2:38	Madison, Wisconsin, United States	
Loss	13–7–2	Jorge Rivera	TKO (punches)	UFC on FX: Guillard vs. Miller	January 20, 2012	2	1:31	Nashville, Tennessee, United States	
Loss	13–6–2	Aaron Simpson	Decision (unanimous)	UFC 136	October 8, 2011	3	5:00	Houston, Texas, United States	
Win	13–5–2	Chris Albandia	Submission (triangle choke)	XFO 41: Outdoor War 7	September 3, 2011	1	1:41	Island Lake, Illinois, United States	Middleweight debut.
Loss	12–5–2	Jason Brilz	Decision (unanimous)	UFC Live: Vera vs. Jones	March 21, 2010	3	5:00	Broomfield, Colorado, United States	
Loss	12–4–2	Ryan Bader	Decision (unanimous)	UFC 104	October 24, 2009	3	5:00	Los Angeles, California, United States	
Win	12–3–2	Antonio Mendes	TKO (punches)	UFC 93	January 17, 2009	1	3:35	Dublin, Ireland	
Win	11–3–2	Houston Alexander	Submission (arm-triangle choke)	UFC Fight Night: Diaz vs Neer	September 17, 2008	1	4:53	Omaha, Nebraska, United States	
Win	10–3–2	William Hill	TKO (punches)	GFS: Thunderdome	May 17, 2008	1	2:52	Milwaukee, Wisconsin, United States	Won the GFS Light Heavyweight Championship.
Win	9–3–2	Ryan Antle	Submission (guillotine choke)	GFS: The Warriors	February 16, 2008	1	0:41	Wisconsin, United States	
Loss	8–3–2	Stephan Bonnar	TKO (punches)	UFC 77	October 20, 2007	2	2:47	Cincinnati, Ohio, United States	
Loss	8–2–2	Michael Bisping	TKO (punches)	UFC 66: Liddell vs. Ortiz	December 30, 2006	1	4:24	Las Vegas, Nevada, United States	
Win	8–1–2	Rob MacDonald	Technical Submission (arm-triangle choke)	UFC 62: Liddell vs. Sobral	August 26, 2006	1	2:26	Las Vegas, Nevada, United States	
Win	7–1–2	William Hill	Submission (triangle choke)	Xtreme Fighting Organization 9	January 28, 2006	1	2:37	Lakemoor, Illinois, United States	Won the WFO Light Heavyweight Championship.
Win	6–1–2	Jason Veach	Submission (choke)	Duneland Classic 2	August 6, 2005	1	N/A	Portage, Indiana, United States	
Win	5–1–2	Jason Guida	Submission (triangle choke)	XFO 6: Judgement Day	June 25, 2005	1	3:49	Lakemoor, Illinois, United States	
Loss	4–1–2	Dustin Denes	Submission (kimura)	HOOKnSHOOT: Overdrive	March 9, 2002	1	N/A	Evansville, Indiana, United States	
Draw	4–0–2	Jim Desouza	Draw	HOOKnSHOOT: Kings 2	November 18, 2001	2	5:00	Evansville, Indiana, United States	
Draw	4–0–1	Paul Ivens	Draw	HOOKnSHOOT: Millennium	November 6, 1999	1	15:00	Evansville, Indiana, United States	
Win	4–0	Steve Martin	Submission (strikes)	Cage Combat 4	September 26, 1999	1	4:13	Green Bay, Wisconsin, United States	
Win	3–0	Duane Franzen	Decision	Midwest Shootfighting 1	June 27, 1998	1	10:00	Clinton, Iowa, United States	
Win	2–0	John Lowey	N/A	Midwest Shootfighting 1	June 27, 1998	1	3:59	Clinton, Iowa, United States	
Win	1–0	Ryan Apolonario	Submission (choke)	Fight Sheet Ultimate MMA	July 19, 1998	1	N/A	Milwaukee, Wisconsin, United States	
