= Rob MacDonald =

Canadian mixed martial arts fighter

- Born: September 5, 1978 (age 48); Capreol, Ontario, Canada
- Other names: Bobby Maximus; World's Most Powerful Nerd
- Height: 6 ft 3 in (1.91 m)
- Weight: 250 lb (110 kg; 18 st)
- Division: Heavyweight; Light Heavyweight
- Fighting out of: Toronto, Ontario, Canada
- Years active: 2002-2003; 2005-2009

Mixed martial arts record
- Total: 9
- Wins: 5
- By knockout: 3
- By submission: 2
- Losses: 4
- By knockout: 1
- By submission: 2
- By decision: 1

Other information
- Mixed martial arts record from Sherdog

Robert Lawrence MacDonald (born September 5, 1978) is a Canadian mixed martial artist. From 2002 until 2009, he competed in various high-profile promotions including the UFC, Maximum Fighting Championship, and was a competitor on The Ultimate Fighter 2, where he was the first Canadian to fight on the show. He later returned to competition for The Ultimate Fighter 30 in 2022.

== Background ==
Rob was a nationally ranked wrestler at St. Charles College in Ontario and also excelled on the football and track teams. He graduated from Western Ontario University with degrees in English and Psychology.

== Mixed martial arts career ==
MacDonald made his professional mixed martial arts debut on June 1, 2002, when he faced Zane Hagel at MFC 4: New Groundz. He won the fight via first round submission strikes. After the impressive victory, MacDonald would win two more professional fights, defeating Victor Valimaki and Doug Sauer via TKO. MacDonald would take a three-year hiatus before being signed by the Ultimate Fighting Championship in 2006.

=== Ultimate Fighting Championship ===
MacDonald signed with UFC in early 2006, and made his debut against Jason Lambert at UFC 58 on March 4, 2006. He lost the fight via first round kimura. He then faced Kristian Rothaermel at UFC Ultimate Fight Night 5 on June 28, 2006. He won the fight via armbar submission.

In his third fight in the promotion, MacDonald faced Eric Schafer at UFC 62 on August 26, 2006. He lost the fight via arm-triangle choke, and after dropping to 1–2, was subsequently released from the promotion.

=== Post-UFC career ===
In his first fight outside of the UFC, MacDonald challenged Eliot Marshall for the ROF Light Heavyweight Championship at Ring of Fire 31 on December 1, 2007. He won the fight via second-round TKO. MacDonald faced Hector Ramirez at HCF: Crow's Nest on March 29, 2008. He lost the fight via unanimous decision.

He then faced Chuck Grigsby at VFC 26: Onslaught for the VFC Light Heavyweight Championship on February 20, 2009. He lost the fight via KO.

=== Return to Fighting ===
In 2022, it was reported that MacDonald would make his return to fighting after 14 years to compete on Season 30 of The Ultimate Fighter. MacDonald faced Eduardo Perez on episode 5 of TUF. He lost the fight via TKO in round one.

== Gym Jones ==
For several years MacDonald was the Training Director and GM at Gym Jones; a fitness training facility in Salt Lake City founded by Mark Twight.

== Championships and accomplishments ==
- Ring of Fire
  - ROF Light Heavyweight Championship (One time)
- Ultimate Fighting Championship
  - Submission of the Night (One time) vs. Kristian Rothaermel

== Mixed martial arts record ==
Professional record breakdown
9 matches	5 wins	4 losses
By knockout	3	1
By submission	2	2
By decision	0	1

Res.	Record	Opponent	Method	Event	Date	Round	Time	Location	Notes
Loss	5–4	Chuck Grigsby	KO (punches)	VFC 26: Onslaught	February 20, 2009	1	4:21	Council Bluffs, Iowa, United States	For the VFC Light Heavyweight Championship.
Loss	5–3	Hector Ramirez	Decision (unanimous)	HCF: Crow's Nest	March 29, 2008	3	5:00	Gatineau, Quebec, Canada	
Win	5–2	Eliot Marshall	TKO (punches)	Ring of Fire 31	December 1, 2007	2	1:41	Broomfield, Colorado, United States	Won the ROF Light Heavyweight Championship.
Loss	4–2	Eric Schafer	Submission (arm-triangle choke)	UFC 62: Liddell vs. Sobral	August 26, 2006	1	2:26	Las Vegas, Nevada, United States	
Win	4–1	Kristian Rothaermel	Submission (armbar)	UFC Fight Night 5	June 28, 2006	1	4:01	Las Vegas, Nevada, United States	Submission of the Night.
Loss	3–1	Jason Lambert	Submission (kimura)	UFC 58: USA vs. Canada	March 4, 2006	1	1:54	Las Vegas, Nevada, United States	Light Heavyweight debut.
Win	3–0	Doug Sauer	N/A	TFC 8: Hell Raiser	June 6, 2003	1	N/A	Toledo, Ohio, United States	
Win	2–0	Victor Valimaki	TKO (corner stoppage)	MFC 5: Sweet Redemption	September 21, 2002	1	5:00	Edmonton, Alberta, Canada	
Win	1–0	Zane Hagel	TKO (submission to punches)	MFC 4: New Groundz	June 1, 2002	1	N/A	Calgary, Alberta, Canada	

Exhibition record breakdown		
2 matches	0 wins	2 losses
By knockout	0	1
By submission	0	1

Res.	Record	Opponent	Method	Event	Date	Round	Time	Location	Notes
Loss	0–2	Eduardo Perez	TKO (punches and elbows)	The Ultimate Fighter: Team Peña vs. Team Nunes	May 31, 2022 (air date)	1	3:58	Las Vegas, Nevada, United States	TUF 30 Quarter-final.
Loss	0–1	Brad Imes	Submission (triangle choke)	The Ultimate Fighter 2	June 18, 2005 (air date)	1	4:10	Las Vegas, Nevada, United States	TUF 2 Elimination bout.
