= Ivan Menjivar =

Salvadoran mixed martial arts fighter

- Born: May 30, 1982 (age 44); La Paz, El Salvador
- Other names: The Pride of El Salvador
- Nationality: El Salvador; Canadian
- Height: 5 ft 7 in (1.70 m)
- Weight: 135 lb (61 kg; 9.6 st)
- Division: Welterweight; Lightweight; Featherweight; Bantamweight
- Fighting out of: Montreal, Quebec, Canada
- Team: Tristar Gym
- Rank: Black belt in Brazilian Jiu-Jitsu under Firas Zahabi
- Years active: 2001–2006, 2010–present (MMA)

Mixed martial arts record
- Total: 37
- Wins: 25
- By knockout: 9
- By submission: 10
- By decision: 6
- Losses: 12
- By knockout: 1
- By submission: 2
- By decision: 8
- By disqualification: 1

Other information
- Mixed martial arts record from Sherdog

Ivan Menjivar (born May 30, 1982) is a Salvadorean-Canadian retired mixed martial artist who formerly fought in the featherweight division of the Ultimate Fighting Championship.

== Background ==
Menjivar was born in La Paz, El Salvador, in 1982. Fleeing the corrupt government, Menjivar moved to Montreal with his family when he was 11. He has a brother and a sister. He started training Kung-Fu as a kid, eventually progressing to Brazilian Jiu-Jitsu.

== Mixed martial arts career ==
=== Early career ===
Menjivar formerly fought in the welterweight and lightweight divisions, before dropping to featherweight.

Menjivar made his MMA debut in 2001 and fought until 2006, earning a record of 20–7. After he was defeated by Bart Palaszewski at an IFL event, he retired from MMA. Four years later, he came out of retirement for W-1 MMA, defeating Aaron Miller by triangle choke submission in round one.

=== World Extreme Cagefighting ===
In November 2010, Menjivar signed with the WEC, right before its merger with the UFC.

In his promotional debut, Menjivar dropped to bantamweight and faced Brad Pickett on December 16, 2010 at WEC 53, the final WEC event. After a back and forth fight, Menjivar lost via unanimous decision. The bout won Fight of the Night honors.

=== Ultimate Fighting Championship ===
On October 28, 2010, WEC merged with the UFC. As part of the merger, all WEC fighters were transferred to the UFC.

Menjivar defeated Charlie Valencia via first round TKO on April 30, 2011 at UFC 129, after breaking his nose with a short elbow and following up with punches to finish the fight in 90 seconds.

Menjivar next faced Nick Pace on August 6, 2011 at UFC 133. The bout was held at a catchweight of 138 pounds after Menjivar failed to make weight. He won the fight via unanimous decision.

Menjivar submitted John Albert with a first round rear naked choke on February 15, 2012 at UFC on Fuel TV 1. His performance earned him the Submission of the Night award.

Menjivar was expected to face Renan Barão at UFC 148 on July 7, 2012. However, Barão was pulled from the bout to face Urijah Faber for the Interim Bantamweight Title on the same card. Menjivar instead faced Mike Easton at the event and lost the fight via unanimous decision.

Menjivar defeated promotional newcomer Azamat Gashimov via first round submission due to an armbar on November 17, 2012 at UFC 154. The performance earned Menjivar Submission of the Night honors.

Menjivar faced Urijah Faber on February 23, 2013 at UFC 157. He lost the fight via submission in the first round.

Menjivar was expected to face Norifumi Yamamoto on September 21, 2013 at UFC 165. However, Yamamoto was removed from the bout and was replaced by Wilson Reis. Menjivar lost the fight via unanimous decision.

Menjivar faced Hatsu Hioki in a featherweight bout on March 1, 2014 at The Ultimate Fighter: China Finale. He lost the fight via unanimous decision, and was subsequently released from the promotion.

== Personal life ==
Menjivar and his ex-wife have two children, a daughter and son. With his current partner, they have a daughter, a son and a baby on the way. He balances MMA with a full-time job as a bus driver for the public transport of Montreal STM.

== Championships and achievements ==
- Ultimate Fighting Championship
  - Submission of the Night (Two times) vs. John Albert and Azamat Gashimov
  - UFC.com Awards
    - 2012: Ranked #7 Submission of the Year vs. John Albert

== Mixed martial arts record ==
Professional record breakdown
37 matches	25 wins	12 losses
By knockout	9	1
By submission	10	2
By decision	6	8
By disqualification	0	1

Res.	Record	Opponent	Method	Event	Date	Round	Time	Location	Notes
Loss	25–12	Hatsu Hioki	Decision (unanimous)	The Ultimate Fighter China Finale: Kim vs. Hathaway	March 1, 2014	3	5:00	Macau, SAR, China	Return to Featherweight.
Loss	25–11	Wilson Reis	Decision (unanimous)	UFC 165	September 21, 2013	3	5:00	Toronto, Ontario, Canada	
Loss	25–10	Urijah Faber	Submission (rear-naked choke)	UFC 157	February 23, 2013	1	4:34	Anaheim, California, United States	
Win	25–9	Azamat Gashimov	Submission (armbar)	UFC 154	November 17, 2012	1	2:44	Montreal, Quebec, Canada	Submission of the Night.
Loss	24–9	Mike Easton	Decision (unanimous)	UFC 148	July 7, 2012	3	5:00	Las Vegas, Nevada, United States	
Win	24–8	John Albert	Submission (rear-naked choke)	UFC on Fuel TV: Sanchez vs. Ellenberger	February 15, 2012	1	3:45	Omaha, Nebraska, United States	Submission of the Night.
Win	23–8	Nick Pace	Decision (unanimous)	UFC 133	August 6, 2011	3	5:00	Philadelphia, Pennsylvania, United States	138 lb catchweight bout; Menjivar missed weight.
Win	22–8	Charlie Valencia	TKO (elbow and punches)	UFC 129	April 30, 2011	1	1:30	Toronto, Ontario, Canada	
Loss	21–8	Brad Pickett	Decision (unanimous)	WEC 53	December 16, 2010	3	5:00	Glendale, Arizona, United States	Bantamweight debut.
Win	21–7	Aaron Miller	Submission (triangle choke)	W-1 MMA 5: Judgment Day	June 19, 2010	1	2:25	Montreal, Quebec, Canada	
Loss	20–7	Bart Palaszewski	Decision (split)	International Fight League: World Championship Semifinals	November 2, 2006	3	4:00	Portland, Oregon, United States	
Loss	20–6	Caol Uno	Decision (unanimous)	Hero's 7	October 9, 2006	2	5:00	Yokohama, Japan	Hero's 2006 Lightweight Grand Prix semi-final.
Win	20–5	Hideo Tokoro	Decision (majority)	Hero's 6	August 5, 2006	2	5:00	Tokyo, Japan	Hero's 2006 Lightweight Grand Prix quarter-final.
Win	19–5	Justin Tavernini	Submission (triangle choke)	Ultimate Cage Wars 4	May 27, 2006	1	N/A	Winnipeg, Manitoba, Canada	
Win	18–5	Taiyo Nakahara	Decision (unanimous)	Hero's 5	May 3, 2006	2	5:00	Tokyo, Japan	Hero's 2006 Lightweight Grand Prix opening round.
Loss	17–5	Urijah Faber	DQ (illegal kick to downed opponent)	TKO 24: Eruption	January 28, 2006	2	2:02	Laval, Quebec, Canada	
Win	17–4	Joe Lauzon	Submission (calf slicer)	APEX: Undisputed	September 3, 2005	1	3:39	Montreal, Quebec, Canada	
Win	16–4	Mika Shida	Decision (unanimous)	Pancrase: Spiral 6	July 31, 2005	3	5:00	Tokyo, Japan	
Win	15–4	Brandon Carlson	Submission (rear-naked choke)	KOTC: Edmonton	April 16, 2005	1	0:45	Edmonton, Alberta, Canada	
Win	14–4	Ryan Ackerman	TKO (punches)	APEX: Genesis	September 5, 2004	2	2:02	Montreal, Quebec, Canada	
Loss	13–4	Matt Serra	Decision (unanimous)	UFC 48	June 19, 2004	3	5:00	Las Vegas, Nevada, United States	
Win	13–3	Mike French	Submission (armbar)	Ultimate Generation Combat 6	December 20, 2003	1	0:40	Montreal, Quebec, Canada	
Win	12–3	Antoine Coutu	TKO	Ultimate Generation Combat 5	October 18, 2003	1	N/A	Montreal, Quebec, Canada	
Loss	11–3	Vítor Ribeiro	Decision (unanimous)	Absolute Fighting Championships 4	July 19, 2003	3	5:00	Fort Lauderdale, Florida, United States	
Win	11–2	Brandon Shuey	Submission (kneebar)	WFF 4: Civil War	April 4, 2003	1	0:38	Vancouver, British Columbia, Canada	
Win	10–2	Max Marin	TKO	MFC: Unplugged	November 29, 2002	1	4:12	Edmonton, Alberta, Canada	
Win	9–2	Andy Social	Submission (armbar)	UCC Proving Ground 8	November 3, 2002	1	0:20	Victoriaville, Quebec, Canada	
Win	8–2	Shane Rice	TKO (punches)	UCC 11: The Next Level	October 11, 2002	1	1:58	Montreal, Quebec, Canada	
Win	7–2	Jay R. Palmer	KO (suplex)	UCC Hawaii: Eruption in Hawaii	September 17, 2002	1	1:03	Honolulu, Hawaii, United States	
Win	6–2	Jeff Curran	Decision (unanimous)	UCC 10: Battle for the Belts 2002	June 15, 2002	3	5:00	Hull, Quebec, Canada	
Loss	5–2	Jason Black	Submission (guillotine choke)	UCC 8: Fast and Furious	March 30, 2002	1	3:33	Rimouski, Quebec, Canada	
Win	5–1	Andy Lalonde	TKO (punches)	UCC Proving Ground 4	March 9, 2002	1	1:00	Victoriaville, Quebec, Canada	
Loss	4–1	Georges St-Pierre	TKO (punches)	UCC 7: Bad Boyz	January 25, 2002	1	4:59	Montreal, Quebec, Canada	
Win	4–0	Dany Ward	KO (head kick)	UCC Proving Ground 2	December 16, 2001	1	1:05	Saint-Jean-sur-Richelieu, Quebec, Canada	
Win	3–0	Francois Flibotte	Submission (rear-naked choke)	UCC Proving Ground 1	October 28, 2001	1	1:24	Saint-Jean-sur-Richelieu, Quebec, Canada	
Win	2–0	J.F. Bolduc	Decision (split)	UCC 4: Return Of The Super Strikers	May 12, 2001	1	10:00	Sherbrooke, Quebec, Canada	
Win	1–0	David Guigui	TKO (punches)	UCC 3: Battle for the Belts	January 27, 2001	1	7:54	Sherbrooke, Quebec, Canada	
