= 2002 in Maximum Fighting Championship =

Information
- First date: March 3, 2002
- Last date: November 29, 2002

Events
- Total events: 4

Fights
- Total fights: 35

Chronology
| 2001 in MFC | 2002 in Maximum Fighting Championship | 2003 in MFC |

The year 2002 is the 2nd year in the history of the Maximum Fighting Championship, a mixed martial arts promotion based in Canada. In 2002 Maximum Fighting Championship held 4 events beginning with, MFC 3: Canadian Pride.

== Events list ==
| # | Event title | Date | Arena | Location | Attendance |
|---|---|---|---|---|---|
| 6 | MFC: Unplugged | November 29, 2002 | The Joint Night Club | Edmonton, Alberta | |
| 5 | MFC 5: Sweet Redemption | September 21, 2002 | The AgriCom | Edmonton, Alberta | |
| 4 | MFC 4: New Groundz | June 1, 2002 | Max Bell Arena | Calgary, Alberta | |
| 3 | MFC 3: Canadian Pride | March 3, 2002 | N/A | Grande Prairie, Alberta | |

== MFC 3: Canadian Pride ==
MFC 3: Canadian Pride was an event held on March 3, 2002 in Grande Prairie, Alberta, Canada.

=== Results ===
Main Card
| Weight class | | | | Method | Round | Time | Notes |
|---|---|---|---|---|---|---|---|
| | Brian Stromberg | def. | Shane Biever | Submission (Armbar) | 1 | 1:36 |
| | Dennis Hallman | def. | Mathias Hughes | Submission (Rear-Naked Choke) | 1 | 1:05 |
| | Benji Radach | def. | Shannon Ritch | TKO (Punches) | 1 | 1:18 |
| | Jake Hattan | def. | Max Marin | KO (Slam) | 1 | 1:23 |
| | Jason MacDonald | def. | Chris Peak | Submission (Keylock) | 1 | 1:54 |
| | Frank Colcher | def. | Andy Social | KO (Punches) | 1 | 0:53 |
| | Kevin Dolan | vs. | Bill Mahood | NC (Dolan Kneed in the Groin) | 1 | N/A |
| | Mike Jorgensen | def. | Jamie Leonard | Submission (Rear-Naked Choke) | 1 | N/A |
| | Victor Valimaki | def. | Johnny Gooch | Submission (Rear-Naked Choke) | 1 | N/A |
| | Brad Blackburn | def. | Quenton Pongracz | TKO (Corner Stoppage) | 2 | N/A |

== MFC 4: New Groundz ==
MFC 4: New Groundz was an event held on June 1, 2002 at the Max Bell Arena in Calgary, Alberta, Canada.

=== Results ===
Main Card
| Weight class | | | | Method | Round | Time | Notes |
|---|---|---|---|---|---|---|---|
| | Brad Gumm | def. | Brad Blackburn | Decision (Unanimous) | 3 | 5:00 |
| | Jason MacDonald | def. | Shannon Ritch | Submission (Rear-Naked Choke) | 1 | 2:45 |
| | Max Marin | def. | Sonny Leong | Submission (Rear-Naked Choke) | 1 | N/A |
| | Jake Hattan | def. | Frank Colcher | Decision (Unanimous) | 3 | 5:00 |
| | Victor Valimaki | def. | Chris Peak | TKO (Punches) | 2 | N/A |
| | Jason House | def. | Kevin Dolan | Submission (Rear-Naked Choke) | 1 | N/A |
| | Rob MacDonald | def. | Zane Hagel | Submission (Punches) | 1 | N/A |
| | Brandon Olsen | def. | Mike Jorgensen | TKO (Punches) | 1 | N/A |
| | Gavin Hesson | def. | Andrew Redden | Submission (Rear-Naked Choke) | 1 | N/A |

== MFC 5: Sweet Redemption ==
MFC 5: Sweet Redemption was an event held on September 21, 2002 at The AgriCom in Edmonton, Alberta, Canada.

=== Results ===
Main Card
| Weight class | | | | Method | Round | Time | Notes |
|---|---|---|---|---|---|---|---|
| | Jason Macdonald | def. | Cameron Brown | Submission (Rear-Naked Choke) | 2 | 4:09 |
| | Rob MacDonald | def. | Victor Valimaki | TKO (Corner Stoppage) | 1 | 5:00 |
| | Max Marin | def. | Ryan Diaz | TKO (Punches) | 1 | 1:02 |
| | Shane Biever | def. | Chris Fontaine | KO (Punches) | 2 | 2:51 |
| | Jason St. Louis | def. | Brad Arbic | TKO (Corner Stoppage) | 1 | 5:00 |
| | Brandon Olsen | def. | Scott Schilling | TKO (Punches) | 1 | 3:08 |
| | Gavin Hesson | def. | Marco Costa | Decision (Unanimous) | 3 | 5:00 |
| | Chris Peak | def. | Kevin Dolan | Submission (Rear Naked Choke) | 1 | 1:47 |
| | Antonio Carvalho | def. | Luke Boutin | Submission (Triangle Choke) | 1 | 1:29 |

== MFC: Unplugged ==
MFC: Unplugged was an event held on November 29, 2002 at The Joint Night Club in Edmonton, Alberta, Canada.

=== Results ===
Main Card
| Weight class | | | | Method | Round | Time | Notes |
|---|---|---|---|---|---|---|---|
| | Jason Macdonald | def. | Yan Pellerin | Submission (Heel Hook) | 1 | 0:00 |
| | Jason St. Louis | def. | Quenton Pongracz | Submission (Triangle Choke) | 1 | 1:49 |
| | Ivan Menjivar | def. | Max Marin | TKO | 1 | 4:12 |
| | Kultar Gill | def. | Kevin Dolan | TKO | 1 | 2:03 |
| | Jason Tatlow | def. | Brian Reaman | Submission (Rear Naked Choke) | 1 | 0:00 |
| | Chad Hamzeh | def. | Chris Tolentino | Submission (Rear Naked Choke) | 2 | 0:00 |
| | Ray Dam | def. | Luke Boutin | Submission (Triangle Choke) | 1 | 0:00 |

== See also ==
- Maximum Fighting Championship
- List of Maximum Fighting Championship events
