= UFC Fight Night: Lauzon vs. Stephens =

UFC mixed martial arts event in 2009

- The poster for UFC Fight Night: Lauzon vs. Stephens
- Promotion: Ultimate Fighting Championship
- Date: February 7, 2009
- Venue: USF Sun Dome
- City: Tampa, Florida
- Attendance: 7,596
- Total gate: $428,000
- Total purse: $304,000

Event chronology
UFC 94: St. Pierre vs Penn 2	UFC Fight Night: Lauzon vs. Stephens	UFC 95: Sanchez vs. Stevenson

UFC Fight Night: Lauzon vs. Stephens (also known as UFC Fight Night 17) was a mixed martial arts event held by the Ultimate Fighting Championship (UFC) on February 7, 2009.

== Background ==
The main event was originally scheduled to be between Joe Lauzon and Hermes Franca. However, Franca suffered a torn ACL during training and could no longer participate in this event. He was replaced by Jeremy Stephens.

Derek Downey replaced Amir Sadollah in a bout against Nick Catone. Sadollah pulled out after being sidelined with a broken clavicle.

Dan Miller replaced Alessio Sakara in a bout against Jake Rosholt. Sakara pulled out of the bout with a shoulder injury.

Matt Veach replaced George Sotiropoulos against Matt Grice. Sotiropoulos suffered a rib injury.

== Results ==
Main card (Spike TV)
Weight class				Method	Round	Time	Notes
Lightweight	Joe Lauzon	def.	Jeremy Stephens	Submission (armbar)	2	4:43
Heavyweight	Cain Velasquez	def.	Denis Stojnić	TKO (punches)	2	2:34
Lightweight	Josh Neer	def.	Mac Danzig	Submission (triangle choke)	2	3:36
Welterweight	Anthony Johnson	def.	Luigi Fioravanti	TKO (punches)	1	4:39
Preliminary card
Lightweight	Kurt Pellegrino	def.	Rob Emerson	Submission (rear-naked choke)	2	3:14
Middleweight	Dan Miller	def.	Jake Rosholt	Submission (guillotine choke)	1	1:03	(Note: This bout was aired on the broadcast following the Neer vs Danzig bout.)
Lightweight	Matt Veach	def.	Matt Grice	TKO (punches)	1	4:34
Lightweight	Gleison Tibau	def.	Rich Clementi	Submission (guillotine choke)	1	4:35	(Note: This bout was aired on the broadcast following the Miller vs Rosholt bout.)
Middleweight	Nick Catone	def.	Derek Downey	Submission (keylock)	2	1:15
Welterweight	Matthew Riddle	def.	Steve Bruno	Decision (unanimous) (29–28, 29–28, 29–28)	3	5:00

== Bonus awards ==
The following fighters received $30,000 bonuses.

- Fights of the Night: Mac Danzig vs. Josh Neer
- Knockout of the Night: Cain Velasquez
- Submission of the Night: Joe Lauzon

== See also ==
- Ultimate Fighting Championship
- List of UFC champions
- List of UFC events
- 2009 in UFC
