= 2001 in Maximum Fighting Championship =

Information
- First date: November 1, 2001
- Last date: November 1, 2001

Events
- Total events: 2

Fights
- Total fights: 19

Chronology
2001 in Maximum Fighting Championship	2002 in MFC

The year 2001 is the first year in the history of the Maximum Fighting Championship, a mixed martial arts promotion based in Canada. In 2001, Maximum Fighting Championship held two events, beginning with MFC 1: Maximum Fighting.

== Events list ==
#	Event title	Date	Arena	Location	Attendance
2	MFC 2: Rumble at the Jungle	November 24, 2001	West Edmonton Mall	Edmonton, Alberta	
1	MFC 1: Maximum Fighting	March 3, 2001	N/A	Grande Prairie, Alberta	

== MFC 1: Maximum Fighting ==
MFC 1: Maximum Fighting was an event held on March 3, 2001, in Grande Prairie, Alberta, Canada.

=== Results ===
Main Card
Weight class				Method	Round	Time	Notes
	Shane Biever	def.	Lee Mein	Submission	0	0:00
	Wyatt Lewis	def.	Jeremy Livingston	Submission	0	0:00
	Steve Russell	def.	Rob Kubert	TKO (Punches)	0	0:00
	Mike Jorgensen	def.	Ed Crichton	Submission	0	0:00
	Cody Gretzan	def.	Eduardo Marin	TKO (Punches)	1	0:06
	JR Wallace	def.	Victor Valimaki	Decision	3	5:00
	Brock Myrol	def.	Rob Mein	Submission	0	0:00
	Mike Yackulic	def.	Bruce Pack	TKO (Punches)	0	0:00
	Gary Vig	def.	Quenton Pongracz	Submission	0	0:00
	Ray Patricio	def.	Chris Ade	TKO (Punches)	0	0:00

== MFC 2: Rumble at the Jungle ==
MFC 2: Rumble at the Jungle was an event held on November 24, 2001, at the West Edmonton Mall in Edmonton, Alberta, Canada.

=== Results ===
Main Card
Weight class				Method	Round	Time	Notes
	Max Marin	def.	Frank Colcher	Submission (Fatigue)	0	N/A
	Alex Schoenauer	def.	Jason Fairn	Submission	0	N/A
	Jason MacDonald	def.	Bill Mahood	Technical Submission (Guillotine Choke)	3	1:17
	Quenton Pongracz	def.	Jason St. Louis	Submission (Triangle Choke)	1	1:49
	Trevor Michaelis	def.	Mathias Hughes	Submission (Rear-Naked Choke)	0	N/A
	Jason Townes	def.	Jesse Richardson	Submission (Keylock)	0	N/A
	Cody Gretzan	def.	Greg Setter	Submission	0	N/A
	Mike Povajnuk	def.	Jerry Castro	Submission	0	N/A
	Bob Shabaga	def.	Shane Boon	Disqualification	0	N/A

== See also ==
- Maximum Fighting Championship
- List of Maximum Fighting Championship events
