= Kurt Pellegrino =

American mixed martial arts fighter

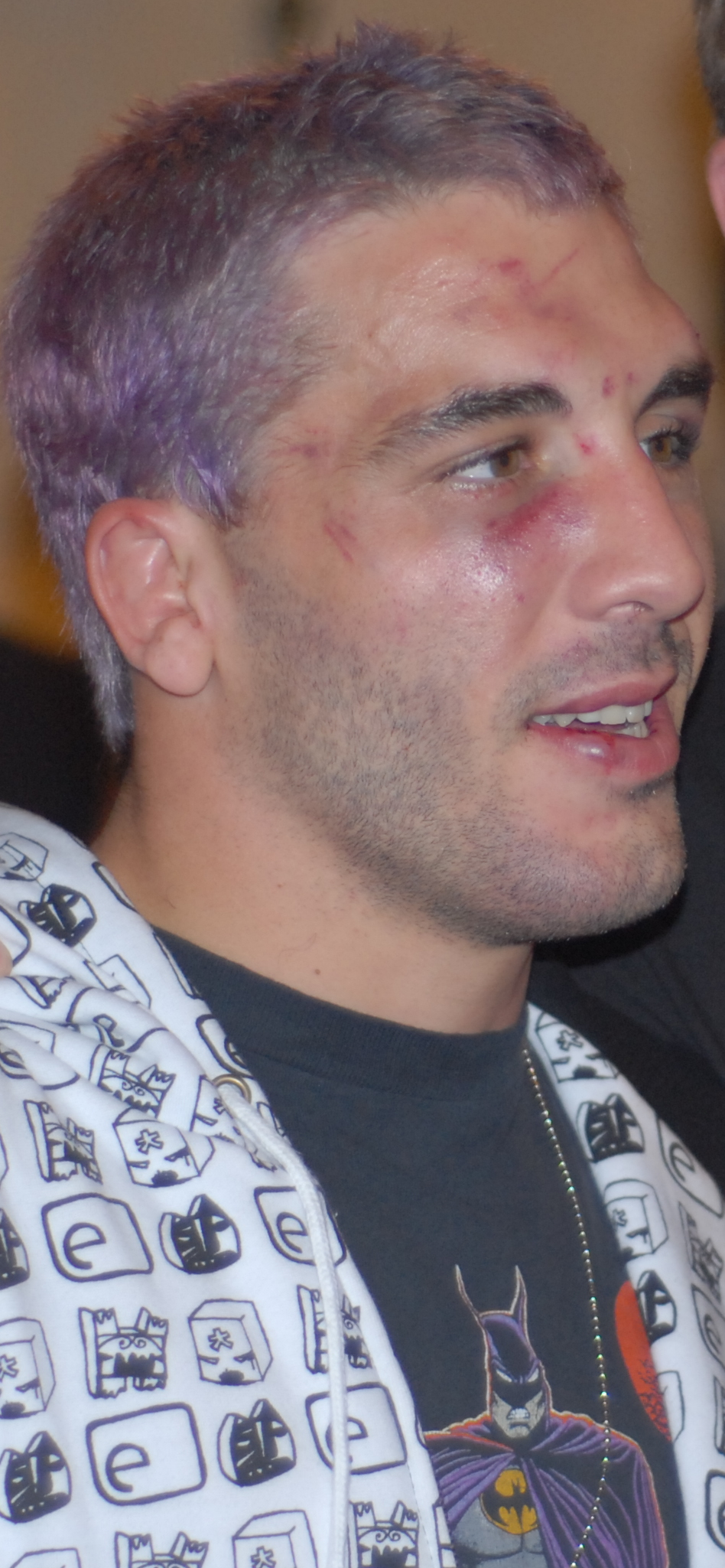
- Born: May 7, 1979 (age 47); Point Pleasant, New Jersey, U.S.
- Other names: Batman
- Nationality: American
- Height: 5 ft 8 in (1.73 m)
- Weight: 155 lb (70 kg; 11.1 st)
- Division: Lightweight; Welterweight
- Reach: 71.5 in (182 cm)
- Stance: Orthodox
- Fighting out of: Point Pleasant, New Jersey
- Team: Kurt Pellegrino Mixed Martial Arts Academy
- Rank: 3rd degree black belt in Brazilian Jiu-Jitsu under Marcelo Garcia
- Years active: 2002–2011

Mixed martial arts record
- Total: 23
- Wins: 16
- By knockout: 2
- By submission: 10
- By decision: 4
- Losses: 7
- By knockout: 1
- By submission: 3
- By decision: 3

Other information
- Mixed martial arts record from Sherdog

Kurt Joseph Pellegrino (born May 7, 1979) is an American retired mixed martial artist. He competed in the lightweight division for Bellator Fighting Championships and Ultimate Fighting Championship. He’s a former WEC champion.

== Early life ==
Pellegrino wrestled for Point Pleasant Borough High School and placed second in the state in his junior and senior year. Pellegrino was a two-time wrestling state finalist.

== Career ==
Pellegrino trained with Ricardo Almeida, a world-famous Brazilian Jiu Jitsu competitor at a Renzo Gracie affiliate school. He later trained with Kenny Florian's camp in Boston, Massachusetts, and at the Armory in Jupiter, Florida with Justin Haskins, Eduardo Guedes, and Raphael Chaves. He subsequently moved to New Jersey, where he opened Kurt Pellegrino's MMA School in Belmar, New Jersey in 2008.

=== Ultimate Fighting Championship ===
The Italian-American Pellegrino fought Alberto Crane at UFC Fight Night on January 23, 2008, who he defeated via second round TKO. The fight was notable as the only preliminary bout aired on the televised card. He received Fight of the Night award for this fight. Also, Pellegrino had a tooth knocked out early in the fight, which actually ripped a hole in his mouth, under his lip, and still went on to win, impressing fans and commentators alike.

Despite a strong first round, Pellegrino was defeated by TUF 5 winner Nate Diaz via triangle choke at UFC Fight Night 13 on April 2, 2008, in Broomfield, Colorado. As Diaz locked up the choke, he had time to flex for the crowd and throw up double middle fingers before Pellegrino submitted.

He defeated Thiago Tavares, in a preliminary bout at UFC 88: Breakthrough. Pellegrino bloodied Tavares' face in the first round and went on to win by a unanimous decision (29–28, 29–27, 29–27). There was a small controversy in the fight, as it appeared that Tavares submitted to an armbar in the second round, but the referee did not stop the bout, causing boos from the audience. The fight was awarded Fight of the Night honors and was voted by UFC as the #2 best fight of 2008.

Pellegrino next fought at UFC Fight Night 17 on February 7, 2009. He defeated Rob Emerson by submission due to a rear naked choke in the third round.

At UFC 101, Pellegrino defeated Josh Neer by unanimous decision (30–27, 30–27, 30–27). It was his first win on a UFC main card.

He was expected to face Frankie Edgar on December 5, 2009 at The Ultimate Fighter 10 Finale, but has been forced off the card due to an injury.

Pellegrino defeated Fabrício Camões at UFC 111 by rear naked choke earning him Submission of the Night.

Pellegrino's next fight was against Australian standout, George Sotiropoulos in which he lost by unanimous decision at UFC 116 on July 3. Pellegrino tore his ACL and meniscus in the 1st round. Two weeks after the fight he underwent two surgeries to repair his meniscus and to replace his ACL.

Pellegrino faced Gleison Tibau on March 19, 2011 at UFC 128 and lost via split decision.

On May 31, 2011, Pellegrino decided not to renew his contract with the UFC and to leave MMA for the time being.

=== Bellator Fighting Championships ===
Pellegrino made his return to MMA and by signing with Bellator Fighting Championships. He fought Patricky Freire at Bellator 59 on November 26 and lost via TKO in the first round. During his post-fight interview, Pellegrino once again announced his retirement from MMA.

Pellegrino was expected to come out of retirement to face Marcin Held at Bellator 68 on May 11, 2012. However, Pellegrino was forced out of the bout due to injury.

He was then expected to face Saul Almeida at Bellator 108. However, Pellegrino was forced out of the bout due to injury once again, and Almeida was pulled from the card as a result.

== Personal life ==
Kurt Pellegrino and his wife Tara share two children. A daughter Millie and son James. Pellegrino also has two older children, Priscilla and Kurt Pellegrino Jr. from a previous marriage.

== Accomplishments ==
Mixed Martial Arts

- World Extreme Cagefighting
  - WEC Lightweight Champion
- Ultimate Fighting Championship
  - Fight of the Night (One time)
  - Submission of the Night (Two time)
  - UFC.com Awards
    - 2008: Ranked #2 Fight of the Year vs. Thiago Tavares & Ranked #7 Fight of the Year vs. Nate Diaz
- Reality Fighting
  - Reality Fighting Lightweight Championship (One time)
- Amateur Wrestling:
  - New Jersey State Wrestling Finalist (Two time)

== Mixed martial arts record ==
Professional record breakdown
23 matches	16 wins	7 losses
By knockout	2	1
By submission	10	3
By decision	4	3

Res.	Record	Opponent	Method	Event	Date	Round	Time	Location	Notes
Loss	16–7	Patricky Freire	TKO (punches)	Bellator 59	November 26, 2011	1	0:50	Atlantic City, New Jersey, United States	
Loss	16–6	Gleison Tibau	Decision (split)	UFC 128	March 19, 2011	3	5:00	Newark, New Jersey, United States	
Loss	16–5	George Sotiropoulos	Decision (unanimous)	UFC 116	July 3, 2010	3	5:00	Las Vegas, Nevada, United States	
Win	16–4	Fabrício Camões	Submission (rear-naked choke)	UFC 111	March 27, 2010	2	4:20	Newark, New Jersey, United States	Submission of the Night
Win	15–4	Josh Neer	Decision (unanimous)	UFC 101	August 8, 2009	3	5:00	Philadelphia, Pennsylvania, United States	
Win	14–4	Rob Emerson	Submission (rear-naked choke)	UFC Fight Night: Lauzon vs. Stephens	February 7, 2009	2	3:14	Tampa, Florida, United States	
Win	13–4	Thiago Tavares	Decision (unanimous)	UFC 88	September 6, 2008	3	5:00	Atlanta, Georgia, United States	Fight of the Night
Loss	12–4	Nate Diaz	Submission (triangle choke)	UFC Fight Night: Florian vs. Lauzon	April 2, 2008	2	3:06	Broomfield, Colorado, United States	
Win	12–3	Alberto Crane	TKO (punches)	UFC Fight Night: Swick vs. Burkman	January 23, 2008	2	1:55	Las Vegas, Nevada, United States	
Loss	11–3	Joe Stevenson	Decision (unanimous)	UFC 74	August 25, 2007	3	5:00	Las Vegas, Nevada, United States	
Win	11–2	Nate Mohr	Submission (achilles lock)	UFC Fight Night: Stevenson vs. Guillard	April 5, 2007	1	2:58	Las Vegas, Nevada, United States	Submission of the Night
Win	10–2	Junior Assunção	Submission (rear-naked choke)	UFC 64: Unstoppable	October 14, 2006	1	2:04	Las Vegas, Nevada, United States	
Win	9–2	Jesse Chilton	Submission (guillotine choke)	Absolute Fighting Championships 18	August 26, 2006	1	3:35	Boca Raton, Florida, United States	
Loss	8–2	Drew Fickett	Submission (rear-naked choke)	UFC 61: Bitter Rivals	July 8, 2006	3	1:20	Las Vegas, Nevada, United States	
Win	8–1	Vadim Kulchitskiy	Submission (guillotine choke)	Reality Fighting 11	February 11, 2006	1	N/A	Atlantic City, New Jersey, United States	
Win	7–1	Kazuki Okubo	TKO (doctor stoppage)	Euphoria: USA vs. Japan	November 5, 2005	1	0:38	Atlantic City, New Jersey, United States	
Win	6–1	Steve Kinnison	Submission (rear naked choke)	Freestyle Combat Challenge 20	September 24, 2005	N/A	N/A	Racine, Wisconsin, United States	
Win	5–1	Sergey Golyaev	Submission (arm-triangle choke)	Euphoria: USA vs. Russia	May 14, 2005	1	3:24	Atlantic City, New Jersey, United States	
Win	4–1	Jay R. Palmer	Submission (rear-naked choke)	Ring of Combat 7	November 20, 2004	1	3:16	Elizabeth, New Jersey, United States	
Loss	3–1	Satoru Kitaoka	Submission (guillotine choke)	Pancrase: 2004 Neo-Blood Tournament Semifinals	July 25, 2004	2	0:34	Tokyo, Japan	
Win	3–0	Muhsin Corbbrey	Decision (unanimous)	Reality Fighting 6	April 3, 2004	3	5:00	Wildwood, New Jersey, United States	Won Reality Fighting Lightweight Championship
Win	2–0	Jay Isip	Submission (armbar)	Reality Fighting 5	November 1, 2003	1	3:38	Atlantic City, New Jersey, United States	
Win	1–0	Mac Danzig	Decision (unanimous)	WEC 4	August 31, 2002	3	5:00	Uncasville, Connecticut, United States	Won the inaugural WEC Lightweight Championship.

== See also ==
- List of Bellator MMA alumni
