= MFC 28 =

Maximum Fighting Championship MMA event in 2011

MFC 28: Supremacy
- Promotion: Maximum Fighting Championship
- Date: February 25, 2011
- Venue: River Cree Casino
- City: Enoch, Alberta

Event chronology
MFC 27: Breaking Point	MFC 28: Supremacy	MFC 29: Conquer

MFC 28: Supremacy was a mixed martial arts event held by the Maximum Fighting Championship (MFC) on February 25, 2011 at the River Cree Casino in Enoch, Alberta.

== Background ==
Antonio McKee was originally scheduled to defend his lightweight title against Drew Fickett. However, McKee was forced to withdraw from the bout and was replaced by UFC veteran Matt Veach.

== Results ==
=== Main Card ===
- MFC Light Heavyweight Championship bout: (Canada) Ryan Jimmo vs. (Canada) Dwayne Lewis

Jimmo defeated Lewis via TKO (doctor stoppage) at 3:13 of round 3 to win the vacant MFC Light Heavyweight Championship.

- Catchweight (160 lbs) bout: (United States) Drew Fickett vs. (United States) Matt Veach

Fickett defeated Veach via submission (armbar) at 0:36 of round 1.

- Lightweight bout: (United States) Richie Whitson vs. (United States) Curtis Demarce

Whitson defeated Demarce via split decision (28–29, 29–28, 29–28).

- Welterweight bout: (United States) Thomas Denny vs. (Canada) Sheldon Westcott

Denny and Westcott fought to a split draw (28–28, 28–27, 28–29).

- Light Heavyweight bout: (United States) Rodney Wallace vs. (United States) Emanuel Newton

Newton defeated Wallace via submission (rear naked choke) at 4:34 of round 2.

- Lightweight bout: (United States) Robert Washington vs. (United States) Tyrone Glover

Glover defeated Washington via split decision (29–28, 28–29, 29–28).

- Lightweight bout: (Canada) Dan Ring vs. (Canada) Garret Nybakken

Ring defeated Nybakken via submission (rear naked choke) at 2:21 of round 2.

- Catchweight (179 lb.) bout: (Canada) Brendan Kornberger vs. (Canada) Paapa Inkumsah

Kornberger defeated Inkumsah via unanimous decision.
