= Bruno F. Fernandes =

Brazilian martial artist

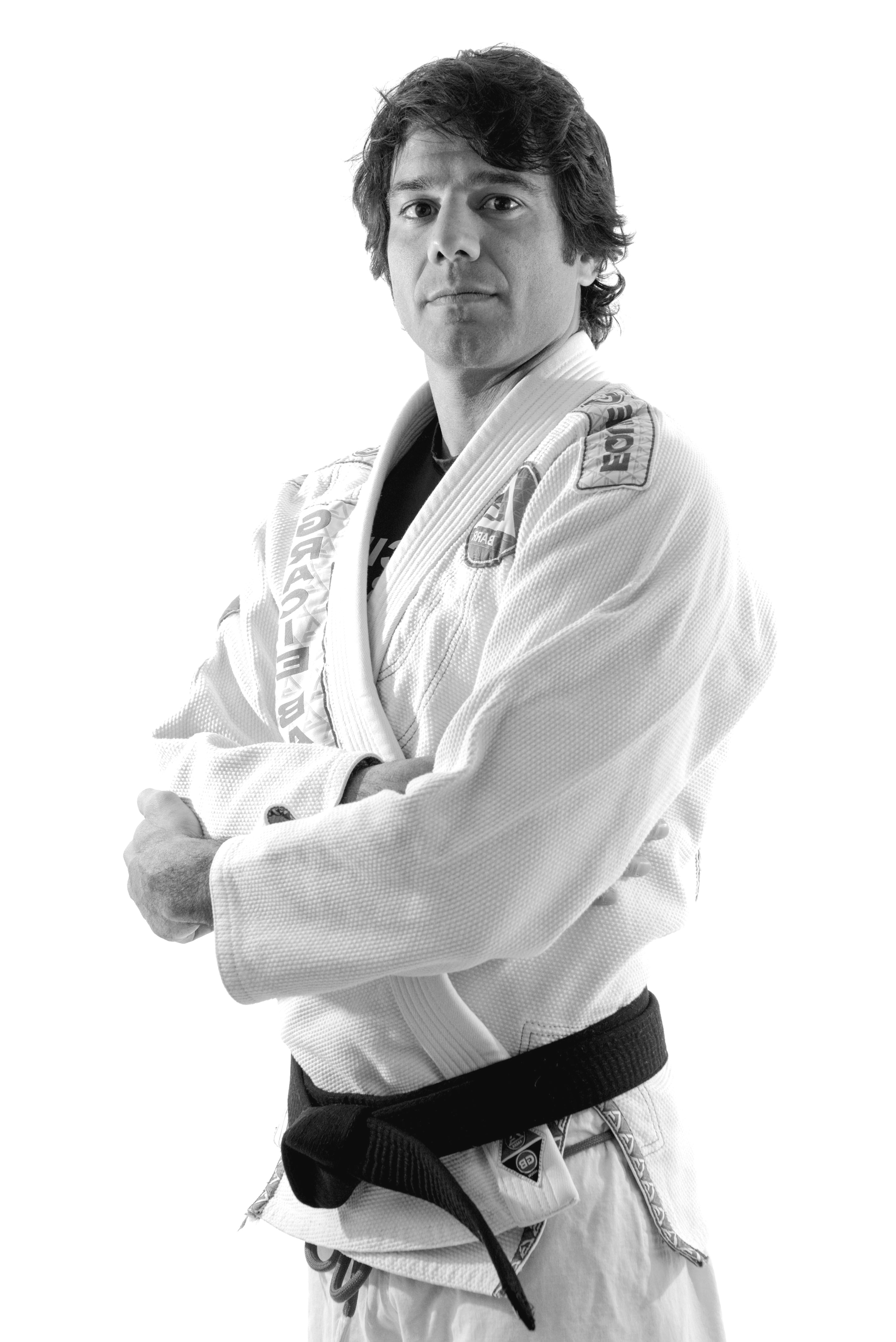
- Bruno F. Fernandes
- Born: April 6, 1978 (age 48); Rio de Janeiro, Brazil
- Height: 6 ft 0 in (1.83 m)
- Weight: 170 lb (77 kg; 12 st)
- Style: Brazilian Jiu-Jitsu
- Team: Gracie Barra
- Rank: 6th degree black belt in Brazilian Jiu-jitsu under Carlos Gracie Jr.

Other information
- Occupation: Brazilian Jiu-Jitsu teacher, entrepreneur, researcher
- Notable students: Georges St. Pierre Vince Mattei

Bruno F. Fernandes
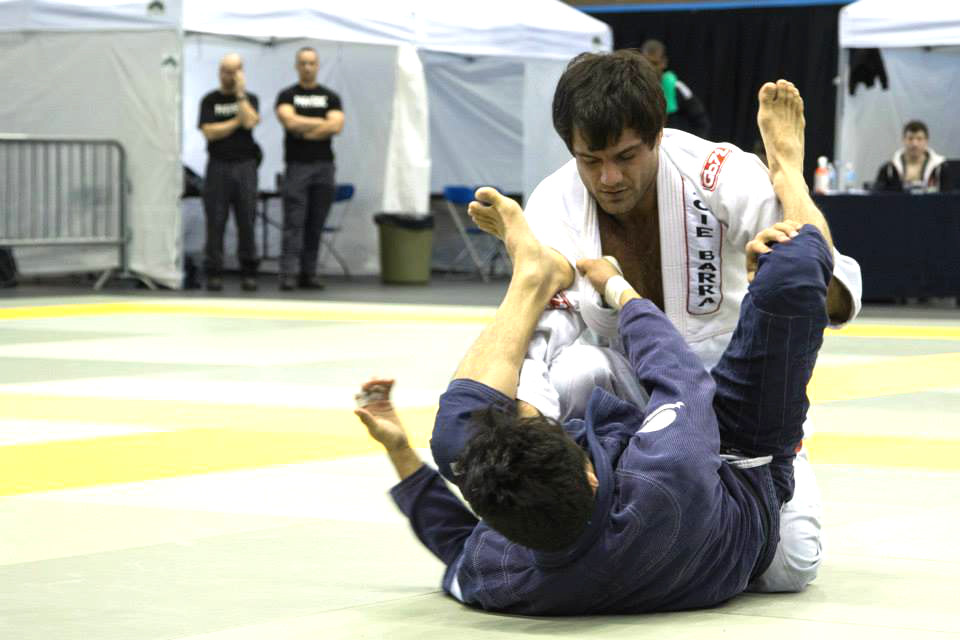
- Bruno F. Fernandes in competition

Medal record

Representing Brazil

Grappling

Brazilian Jiu-Jitsu

World Championship
Silver medal – second place	2002 United States	Middleweight
Bronze medal – third place	2001 United States	Middleweight
Gold medal – first place	2000 United States	Middleweight
Silver medal – second place	1999 United States	Middleweight
Gold medal – first place	1998 United States	Middleweight
Silver medal – second place	1997 United States	Middleweight

Pan American Championship
Gold medal – first place	2014 United States	Middleweight
Bronze medal – third place	2008 United States	Middleweight
Gold medal – first place	1998 United States	Open category
Gold medal – first place	1998 United States	Middleweight
Gold medal – first place	1997 United States	Middleweight

Nogi Pan American Championship
Bronze medal – third place	2013 United States	Middleweight
Bronze medal – third place	2012 United States	Middleweight

Brazilian Championships
Bronze medal – third place	2004 Brazil	Middleweight
Bronze medal – third place	1998 Brazil	Middleweight
Gold medal – first place	1997 Brazil	Middleweight
Silver medal – second place	1997 Brazil	Open category
Gold medal – first place	1996 Brazil	Middleweight
Bronze medal – third place	1994 Brazil	Middleweight

Australian Championships
Gold medal – first place	2013	Australia

Bruno Franco Fernandes (born April 6, 1978) is a Brazilian martial arts teacher (6th degree Brazilian Jiu-Jitsu Black belt) based in Montreal, Quebec, Canada.

In 2010, he founded Gracie Barra (GB) Montreal, a school of Brazilian Jiu-Jitsu, and became President of GB Wear Canada. He is also the regional Director of Gracie Barra Association for Quebec, Canada. During his martial arts career, he won multiple World Championship titles and received many awards and recognitions in international Brazilian Jiu-Jitsu tournaments such as the Mundials (Brazilian Jiu-Jitsu World Championships), Pan-American Championships, and Brazilian Nationals, as well as in local state- and city-sponsored cups.

== Awards and achievements ==
Fernandes won 2 medals at the IBJJF world championships as an adult black belt—a bronze in 2001 and a silver in 2002. From an early age, Bruno Fernandes has participated regularly in world, regional, national, state and city championships. A collection of his tournament successes are listed below.

=== Notable students ===
As Founder and Head instructor of the Montreal branch of Gracie Barra, Bruno Fernandes has been teaching many students the art of Brazilian Jiu-Jitsu. He is assisted by BJJ practitioners, MMA fighters and conditioning coaches including Ivan Menjivar and Olivier Aubin-Mercier.

- Georges St-Pierre, a MMA fighter and world champion, is a student of Fernandes. He was awarded a Black Belt in 2008 and a related first stripe in 2011.
- Rodolphe Beaulieu was awarded a Black Belt in 2011 after training with Bruno F Fernandes from 2006.

=== Local championships ===
- 2013: IBJJ Montreal Open middleweight Champion (age: 35).
- 2013: IBJJ Montreal Open category, Absolute Champion (age: 35).
- 2013: Australian National Championship, Champion (age: 35).
- 2000: São Paulo State Championship, Open category, Third place (age: 22).
- 2000: São Paulo State Championship, middleweight, Champion (age: 22).
- 1997: Rio de Janeiro State Championship, middleweight, Third place (age: 19).
- 1996: Rio de Janeiro State Championship, middleweight, Champion (age: 18).
- 1994: Rio de Janeiro State Championship, middle-heavyweight, Champion (age: 16).
- 1991: Rio de Janeiro State Championship, middle-heavyweight, Champion (age: 13).

=== World championships ===
- 2004: Middleweight, Fifth Place (age: 26).
- 2003: Middleweight, Fifth Place (age: 25).
- 2002: Middleweight, Second Place black belt (age: 24).
- 2001: Middleweight, Third Place black belt (age: 23).
- 2000: Middleweight, Champion brown belt (age: 22).
- 1999: Middleweight, Second Place brown belt (age: 21).
- 1998: Middleweight, Champion brown belt (age: 20).
- 1997: Middleweight, Second Place purple belt (age: 19).

=== Pan-American championships ===
- 2013: No-Gi Middleweight, Third place (age: 35).
- 2012: No-Gi Middleweight, Third place (age: 34).
- 2008: Middleweight, Third place (age: 29).
- 1998: Open category, Absolute Champion (age: 19).
- 1998: Middleweight, Champion (age: 19).
- 1997: Middleweight, Champion (age: 19).

=== Brazilian championships ===
- 2004: Middle-heavyweight, Third place (age: 26).
- 1998: Middleweight, Third place (age: 20).
- 1997: Middleweight, Champion (age: 19).
- 1997: Open category, Second place (age: 19).
- 1996: Middleweight, Champion (age: 18).
- 1994: Middle-heavyweight, Third place (age: 16).

== See also ==
- List of Brazilian Jiu-Jitsu practitioners
