= TKO Major League MMA in 2000 =

TKO Major League MMA events in 2000

Information
- Promotion: TKO Major League MMA
- First date aired: June 2, 2000
- Last date aired: August 12, 2000

The year 2000 was the debut year in the history of TKO Major League MMA, a mixed martial arts promotion based in Canada. Initially called Universal Combat Challenge (UCC) before rebranding to TKO Major League MMA in 2003. These early event had two 10 minute rounds and saw the promotions first Champions crowned.

== Event list ==
=== TKO Major League 1: The New Beginning ===
UCC 1: The New Beginning
- Promotion: TKO Major League MMA
- Date: June 02, 2000
- Venue: N/A
- City: Montreal, Quebec, CAN

Event chronology
Inaugurated	UCC 1: The New Beginning	TKO Major League 2: Moment Of Truth

TKO/UCC Major League 1: The New Beginning was the inaugural event of TKO Major League MMA and took place on June 02, 2000. It aired on RDS.

Results

Main Card
Weight class				Method	Round	Time	Notes
Heavyweight	Dave Beneteau	draws.	Elvis Sinosic	Draw	2	10:00	(Note: For the Inaugural TKO/UCC World Heavyweight Championship)
Middleweight	Claudionor da Silva Fontinelle	def.	Dirk Waardenburg	Submission (armbar)	1	5:30	(Note: For the Inaugural TKO/UCC Middleweight World Championship)
Light Heavyweight	Stephan Potvin	def.	Rob Tallack	Decision (unanimous)	2	10:00	(Note: For the Inaugural TKO/UCC World Light Heavyweight Championship)
Super Lightweight	Wagnney Fabiano	def.	Ali Nestor Charles	Decision (unanimous)	2	10:00	(Note: For the inaugural TKO/UCC World Super Lightweight Championship (145 lbs))
Welterweight	J.F. Bolduc	def.	Joel Leblanc	Submission (guillotine choke)	1	1:39
Middleweight	Justin Bruckmann	def.	David Loiseau	Submission (armbar)	1	3:04	(Note: Inaugural Middleweight Tournament bout)
Middleweight	Steve Vigneault	def.	Jeff Davis	TKO (punches)	1	0:15	(Note: Inaugural Middleweight Tournament bout)
Middleweight	Matt Rocca	def.	Shawn Tompkins	TKO (punches)	1	8:50	(Note: Inaugural Middleweight Tournament bout)
Middleweight	Donald Ouimet	def.	Sylvain Martineau	TKO (corner stoppage)	1	3:26	(Note: Inaugural Middleweight Tournament bout)
Preliminary Card
Welterweight	Phil Hughes	def.	Roger Pena	Submission (rear-naked choke)	1	4:07

=== TKO Major League 2: Moment Of Truth ===
UCC 2: Moment Of Truth
- Promotion: TKO Major League MMA
- Date: August 12, 2000
- Venue: N/A
- City: Montreal, Quebec, CAN

Event chronology
TKO Major League 1: The New Beginning	UCC 2: Moment Of Truth	TKO Major League 3: Battle For The Belts

TKO/UCC Major League 2: Moment Of Truth was the second event of TKO Major League MMA and took place on August 12, 2000. It saw the beginning of the Inaugural Middleweight Tournament, as well as the introduction of the UCC/TKO Canadian Championships. It aired on RDS.

Results

Main Card
Weight class				Method	Round	Time	Notes
Middleweight	Claudionor da Silva Fontinelle	def.	Tadarius Thomas	Submission (rear-naked choke)	1	1:20	(Note: Defended the TKO/UCC World Middleweight Championship)
Middleweight	David Loiseau	def.	Steve Vigneault	TKO (corner stoppage)	1	10:00	(Note: For the Inaugural Canadian Middleweight Championship(tournament final))
Lightweight	J.F. Bolduc	def.	J.T. McCarthy	Submission (punches)	1	2:11	(Note: For the TKO/UCC Canadian Lightweight Championship)
Middleweight	David Loiseau	def.	Justin Bruckmann	Submission (guillotine choke)	1	3:07	(Note: Inaugural Middleweight Tournament Semi-finals)
Middleweight	Steve Vigneault	def.	Shawn Tompkins	TKO (punches)	1	2:43	(Note: Inaugural Middleweight Tournament Semi-finals)
Middleweight	Jason St. Louis	def.	Marc Longpre	Submission (scarf hold armlock)	1	0:24	(Note: Inaugural Middleweight Tournament alternate bout)
Heavyweight	Dave Beneteau	def.	Joe Campanella	Submission (keylock)	1	1:06
Heavyweight	Mike Hunter	def.	Keith Baker	Submission (forearm choke)	1	4:44
Preliminary Card
Light Heavyweight	Barney Schisler	def.	Rob Tallack	Decision (unanimous)	2	10:00
