= TKO Major League in 2019 =

TKO Major League MMA events in 2019

2019 in TKO Major League MMA

Information
- Promotion: TKO Major League MMA
- First date aired: April 11, 2019
- Last date aired: May 24, 2019

2019 was the 13th active year in the history of TKO Major League MMA, a mixed martial arts promotion based in Canada. Initially called Universal Combat Challenge (UCC) before rebranding to TKO Major League MMA in 2003. It was to hold 4 events in 2019.

== Event list ==
=== TKO Major League 46: Pessoa vs. Gane ===
TKO Major League 46: Pessoa vs. Gane
- Promotion: TKO Major League MMA
- Date: March 14, 2019
- Venue: Centre Vidéotron
- City: Quebec City, Quebec, CAN

Event chronology
TKO Major League 45: Jourdain vs. Morgan	TKO Major League 46: Pessoa vs. Gane	TKO Major League 47: Jourdain vs. Lapilus

TKO Major League 46: Pessoa vs. Gane was to be the first event of TKO Major League MMA in 2019 and was to take place on March 14, 2019. The promotion was forced to cancel the event due to a record 18 fighter's being injured or ill well trying to book the card.

=== TKO Major League 47: Jourdain vs. Lapilus ===
TKO Major League 47: Jourdain vs. Lapilus
- Promotion: TKO Major League MMA
- Date: April 11, 2019
- Venue: Centre Claude-Robillard
- City: Montreal, Quebec, CAN

Event chronology
TKO Major League 46: Pessoa vs. Gane	TKO Major League 47: Jourdain vs. Lapilus	TKO Major League 48: Sousa vs. Gane

TKO Major League 47: Jourdain vs. Lapilus was the 59th event of TKO Major League MMA and took place on April 11, 2019. The prelims aired on Fight Network and the main card on UFC Fightpass.

Results

Main Card
Weight class				Method	Round	Time	Notes
Lightweight	Charles Jourdain	def.	Damien Lapilus	TKO (punches)	5	2:02	(Note: For the TKO Interim Lightweight Championship)
Flyweight	Malcolm Gordon	def.	Yoni Sherbatov	Submission (rear-naked choke)	1	1:32	(Note: For the TKO Flyweight Championship)
Bantamweight	Xavier Alaoui	def.	Johnny Baldridge	Submission (rear-naked choke)	1	3:09
Light Heavyweight	Alan Baudot	def.	Todd Stoute	DQ (overturned by Promoter)	3	3:54
Welterweight	Yohan Lainesse	def.	Bertin Descloux	Decision (unanimous)	3	5:00
Flyweight	James Mancini	def.	Kendrick Latchman	Decision (split)	3	5:00
Preliminary Card
Catchweight (190 lbs)	Julius Trimmeliti	def.	Simon Lagarde	Submission (barbo choke)	1	4:22
Flyweight	Brandon Lee	def.	Dominic Lacroix	Submission (rear-naked choke)	2	3:56
Bantamweight	Maxime Bacon	def.	Samuel Giguere	TKO (doctor stoppage)	2	5:00
Flyweight	Pierre Thivierge	def.	Nigel Crosswell	Submission (rear-naked choke)	1	3:18

=== TKO Major League 48: Sousa vs. Gane ===
TKO Major League 48: Sousa vs. Gane
- Promotion: TKO Major League MMA
- Date: May 24, 2019
- Venue: Robert Guertin Arena
- City: Gatineau, Quebec, CAN

Event chronology
TKO Major League 47: Jourdain vs. Lapilus	TKO Major League 48: Sousa vs. Gane	TKO Major League 49: Matsuba vs. Gordan

TKO Major League 48: Sousa vs. Gane was the 60th event of TKO Major League MMA and took place on May 24, 2019. The prelims aired on Fight Network and the main card on UFC Fightpass.

Results

Main Card
Weight class				Method	Round	Time	Notes
Heavyweight	Ciryl Gane	def.	Roggers Souza	TKO (punches)	1	4:26	(Note: For the TKO Heavyweight Championship)
Bantamweight	Taylor Lapilus	def.	Nate Maness	KO (kick to the body)	3	1:22	(Note: For the TKO Bantamweight Championship)
Flyweight	Mandy Böhm	def.	Jade Masson-Wong	Submission (rear-naked choke)	3	3:43	(Note: For the vacant TKO Woman's Flyweight Championship)
Bantamweight	Josh Hill	def.	Jesse Arnett	KO (punches)	2	2:11
Bantamweight	Xavier Alaoui	def.	Mateo Vogel	DQ (illegal upkick)	1	2:43
Bantamweight	Isaac Blais	def.	Pierre-Olivier Bouffard	Submission (rear-naked choke)	1	3:28
Flyweight	J. Horth Wessels	def.	Corinne Laframboise	Submission (rear-naked choke)	3	2:57
Lightweight	Alex O'Neil	def.	Cédric Mongeon	Decision (unanimous)	3	5:00
Preliminary Card
Lightweight	Brad Sullivan	def.	Mathieu Charette	Decision (unanimous)	3	5:00
Welterweight	Yan Jacolin	def.	Guillaume Poulin	Submission (rear-naked choke)	1	2:03
Bantamweight	Serge Dancos	def.	Alexandre Gomes	TKO (punches)	1	2:57
Welterweight	Vincent Houle	def.	Curtis Richard	TKO (punches)	2	3:58
Lightweight	Nicolas Pedneault	def.	Mattia Loi-Fonda	TKO (punches)	3	0:30
Bantamweight	Terry Lemaire	def.	Marc Jhingran	Decision (unanimous)	3	5:00

=== TKO Major League 49: Matsuba vs. Gordan ===
TKO Major League 49: Matsuba vs. Gordan
- Promotion: TKO Major League MMA
- Date: October 9, 2019
- Venue: L’Olympia de Montreal
- City: Montreal, Quebec, CAN

Event chronology
TKO Major League 48: Sousa vs. Gane	TKO Major League 49: Matsuba vs. Gordan

TKO Major League 49: Matsuba vs. Gordan was to be the 61st event of TKO Major League MMA in 2019 and was to take place on October 9, 2019. The promotion was forced to cancel the event due to President of the Organization Stephane Patry being hospitalized.
