= TKO Major League MMA =

Defunct Canadian MMA promotion broadcast on UFC Fightpass

- Most recent season or competition: TKO Major League in 2019
- Sport: Mixed martial arts promotion
- Founded: 2000
- Founder: Stéphane Patry
- Owner: Private
- Country: Canada
- Headquarters: Montreal, Quebec
- Website: https://www.facebook.com/tkommaofficial/

TKO Major League MMA was a Canadian mixed martial arts promotion established in 2000, it was originally broadcast on RDS and later on Fight Network. Formerly known as the Universal Combat Challenge (UCC), it was the first mixed martial arts promotion in Canada, before eventually rebranding to TKO Major League MMA in 2003. For years it was the largest MMA promotion in Canada, before eventually going on hiatus for 8 years. Returning in 2016, since then it has signed a deal with the UFC to be broadcast on the promotion's streaming service UFC Fight Pass. The promotion was dissolved, as per Quebec Enterprise Register concluding fiscal year 2019.

== History ==
Founded in early 2000 by Stephane Patry and Universal Combat Challenge (UCC) would allow wrestling, boxing, kickboxing, grappling, their bouts consisted of two 10 minute rounds. The rules at the beginning also allowed for knee's and kick's(soccer kick) to the head of a downed opponent. Following the success of the first event they would announce that the promotion would be instituting Canadian Championship titles as well as the World Championship titles beginning at UCC 2 due to international interest, this would last until 2005 when the promotion unified the titles. TKO/UCC started off with 6 weight classes, 265 lb, formerly unlimited), Light Heavyweight (205 lb), Middleweight(185 lb), Welterweight(170 lb), Lightweight(155 lb) and Super Lightweight(now known as Featherweight 145 lb). Bantamweight would be added in 2007 and following the promotions return from hiatus, Flyweight(125 lb) and 2 female weight classes were introduced, Woman's Flyweight and Woman's Straw-weight (125 lb and 115 lb).

TKO/UCC was the first promotion of its kind in Canada and was host to an abundance of Canada's top MMA talent for close to two decades, in 2003 the organization would be rebranded as TKO Major League MMA. In the promotions early days they used a boxing-style ring for their contests, before eventually being one of the first to adopt the UFC-spec octagon. The promotion has organized 62 events involving over 620 matches.

=== Universal Combat Challenge ===
On June 2, 2000, UCC would hold their first event in Montreal, Quebec, Canada. The promotion ran 21 events under the UCC banner before rebranding to TKO Major League MMA in 2003.

==== Events ====
Title	Date	Location	Main event
UCC PG 9: Proving Ground 9	March 22, 2003	Victoriaville, Quebec, CAN	Stephane-Laliberte def. Emmanuel-Gauthier
UCC 12: Adrenaline	January 25, 2003	Montreal, Quebec, CAN	Duane Ludwig def. Jens Pulver
UCC PG 8: Proving Ground 8	November 3, 2002	Victoriaville, Quebec, CAN	Shawn Peters def. Dany Laflamme
UCC 11: The Next Level	October 11, 2002	Montreal, Quebec, CAN	Jeremy Horn def. Kristof-Midoux
UCC PG 7: Proving Ground 7	September 28, 2002	Victoriaville, Quebec, CAN	Yan Pellerin def. Ricardeau Francois
UCC Hawaii: Euroption in Hawaii	September 17, 2002	Honolulu, Hawaii, US	Jeff Curran def. Baret Yoshida
UCC PG 6: Proving Ground 6	July 21, 2002	Montreal, Quebec, CAN	Yan Pellerin def. Jonathan Goulet
UCC 10: Battle For The Belts 2002	June 15, 2002	Montreal, Quebec, CAN	Sean Alvarez def. Mike Radnov
UCC PG 5: Proving Ground 5	May 19, 2002	Sherbrooke, Quebec, CAN	Raffie Keuleyan def. Pascal Beauregard
UCC 8: Fast And Furious	March 30, 2002	Rimouski, Quebec, CAN	Jesse Jones def. Donald Ouimet
UCC PG 4: Proving Ground 4	March 9, 2002	Victoriaville, Quebec, CAN	Jonathan Goulet def. Robin Dionne
UCC PG 3: Proving Ground 3	February 24, 2002	Jean, Quebec, CAN	Shawn Davidson def. Sebastien Routhier
UCC 7: Bad Boyz	January 25, 2002	Montreal, Quebec, CAN	Jeremy Horn def. Stephan Potvin
UCC PG 2: Proving Ground 2	December 16, 2001	Jean, Quebec, CAN	Ricardeau Francois def. Pascal Gosselin
UCC PG 1: Proving Ground 1	October 28, 2001	Jean, Quebec, CAN	Ricardeau Francois def. Stephane Bourchard
UCC 6: Redemption	October 19, 2001	Montreal, Quebec, CAN	Sean Sherk def. Claudionor Da Silva Fontinelle
UCC 5: Heatwave 2001	June 30, 2001	Quebec City, Quebec, CAN	Stephane Vigneault def. Scott Clay
UCC 4: Return Of The Super Strikers	May 12, 2001	Sherbrooke, Quebec, CAN	Donald Ouimet def. Claudionor Da Silva Fontinelle
UCC 3: Battle For The Belts	January 27, 2001	Sherbrooke, Quebec, CAN	Jason St. Louis def. David Loiseau
UCC 2: The Moment Of Truth	August 12, 2000	Montreal, Quebec, CAN	Claudionor Da Silva Fontinelle def. Tadarius Thomas
UCC 1: The New Beginning	June 2, 2000	Montreal, Quebec, CAN	Dave Beneteau draw. Elvis Sinosic

=== TKO Major League MMA ===
On September 6, 2003, TKO had its first show under the new brand name. 41 events have been held under the TKO banner with the previous UCC events being added onto TKO.

==== Events ====
#	Event title	Date	Location
41	TKO 49: Matsuba vs. Gordan	October 9, 2019	Montreal, Quebec, Canada
38	TKO 48: Souza vs. Gane	May 24, 2019	Gatineau, Quebec, Canada
37	TKO 47: Jourdain vs. Ronson	April 11, 2019	Montreal, Quebec, Canada
36	TKO 46: Pessoa vs. Gane	February 8, 2019	Quebec City, Quebec, Canada
35	TKO 45: Jourdain vs. Morgan	December 7, 2018	Montreal, Quebec, Canada
34	TKO 44: Hunter vs. Barriault	September 21, 2018	Quebec City, Quebec, Canada
40	TKO MMA: TKO Fight Night 1	August 2, 2018	Montreal, Quebec, Canada
33	TKO 43: Barriault vs. Kornberger	May 4, 2018	Quebec City, Quebec, Canada
32	TKO 42: Nogueria vs. Laramie	March 16, 2018	Laval, Quebec, Canada
31	TKO 41: Champions	December 8, 2017	Montreal, Quebec, Canada
30	TKO 40: Denouncment	September 8, 2017	Montreal, Quebec, Canada
29	TKO 39: Ultimatum	June 16, 2017	Saint-Roch-de-l'Achigan, Quebec, Canada
28	TKO 38: Ascension	April 7, 2017	Montreal, Quebec, Canada
27	TKO 37: Rivals	January 3, 2017	Montreal, Quebec, Canada
26	TKO 36: Resurrection	November 4, 2016	Montreal, Quebec, Canada
25	TKO 35: Quenneville vs. Hioki	October 3, 2008	Montreal, Quebec, Canada
24	TKO 34: Sims vs. Bosse	June 7, 2008	Montreal, Quebec, Canada
23	TKO 33: Battle in Paradise	April 18, 2008	Oranjestad, Aruba
22	TKO 32: Ultimatum	February 28, 2008	Montreal, Quebec, Canada
21	TKO 31: Young Guns	December 14, 2007	Montreal, Quebec, Canada
20	TKO 30: Apocalypse	September 28, 2007	Montreal, Quebec, Canada
19	TKO 29: Repercussion	June 1, 2007	Montreal, Quebec, Canada
18	TKO: MMA 2007 Tournament	March 17, 2007	Victoriaville, Quebec, Canada
17	TKO 28: Inevitable	February 9, 2007	Montreal, Quebec, Canada
16	TKO 27: Reincarnation	September 29, 2006	Montreal, Quebec, Canada
15	TKO 26: Heatwave	June 30, 2006	Victoriaville, Quebec, Canada
14	TKO 25: Confrontation	May 5, 2006	Montreal, Quebec, Canada
13	TKO 24: Eurption	January 28, 2006	Laval, Quebec, Canada
12	TKO 23: Extreme	November 5, 2005	Victoriaville, Quebec, Canada
11	TKO 22: Lionheart	September 30, 2005	Montreal, Quebec, Canada
10	TKO 21: Collision	July 15, 2005	Montreal, Quebec, Canada
9	TKO 20: Champion vs. Champion	April 2, 2005	Montreal, Quebec, Canada
8	TKO 19: Rage	January 29, 2005	Montreal, Quebec, Canada
7	TKO 18: Impact	November 26, 2004	Montreal, Quebec, Canada
6	TKO 17: Revenge	September 25, 2004	Victoriaville, Quebec, Canada
5	TKO 16: Infernal	May 22, 2004	Quebec City, Quebec, Canada
4	TKO: Future Stars	March 27, 2004	Victoriaville, Quebec, Canada
3	TKO 15: Unstoppable	February 28, 2004	Montreal, Quebec, Canada
2	TKO 14: Road Warriors	November 29, 2003	Victoriaville, Quebec, Canada
1	TKO 13: Ultimate Rush	September 6, 2003	Montreal, Quebec, Canada

== Events ==
=== Scheduled events ===
#	Event	Date	Venue	Location

=== Past events ===
#	Event	Date	Number of bouts	Location
62	TKO Major League 49: Matsuba vs. Gordan	October 9, 2019	(event cancelled)	Montreal, Quebec, CAN
61	TKO Major League 48: Souza vs. Gane	May 24, 2019	14	Gatineau, Quebec, CAN
60	TKO Major League 47: Jourdain vs. Lapilus	April 11, 2019	10	Montreal, Quebec, CAN
59	TKO Major League 46: Pessoa vs. Gane	February 8, 2019	(event cancelled)	Quebec City, Quebec, CAN
58	TKO Major League 45: Jourdain vs. Morgan	December 7, 2018	12	Montreal, Quebec, CAN
57	TKO Major League 44: Hunter vs. Barriault	September 29, 2018	12	Quebec City, Quebec, CAN
56	TKO Major League :TKO Fight Night 1	August 2, 2018	12	Montreal, Quebec, CAN
55	TKO Major League 43: Barriault vs. Kornberger	May 4, 2018	13	Quebec City, Quebec, CAN
54	TKO Major League 42: Nogueria vs. Laramie	March 16, 2018	13	Laval, Quebec, CAN
53	TKO Major League 41: Champions	December 8, 2017	10	Montreal, Quebec, CAN
52	TKO Major League 40: Denouncement	September 8, 2017	13	Montreal, Quebec, CAN
51	TKO Major League 39: Ultimatum 2	June 16, 2017	16	Saint-Roch-de-l'Achigan, Quebec, CAN
50	TKO Major League 38: Ascension	April 7, 2017	12	Montreal, Quebec, CAN
49	TKO Major League 37: Rivals	January 13, 2017	15	Montreal, Quebec, CAN
48	TKO Major League 36: Resurrection	November 4, 2016	14	Montreal, Quebec, CAN
47	TKO Major League 35: Quenneville vs. Hioki	October 3, 2008	13	Montreal, Quebec, CAN
46	TKO Major League 34: Sims vs. Bosse	June 7, 2008	11	Montreal, Quebec, CAN
45	TKO Major League 33: Battle in Paradise	April 18, 2008	9	Oranjestad, Aruba
44	TKO Major League 32: Ultimatum	February 28, 2008	12	Montreal, Quebec, CAN
43	TKO Major League 31: Young Guns	December 14, 2007	10	Montreal, Quebec, CAN
42	TKO Major League 30: Apocalypse	September 28, 2007	11	Montreal, Quebec, CAN
41	TKO Major League 29: Repercussion	June 1, 2007	11	Montreal, Quebec, CAN
40	TKO Major League MMA 2007 Tournament	March 17, 2007	10	Victoriaville, Quebec, CAN
39	TKO Major League 28: Inevitable	February 9, 2007	12	Montreal, Quebec, CAN
38	TKO Major League 27: Reincarnation	September 29, 2006	11	Montreal, Quebec, CAN
37	TKO Major League 26: Heatwave 2006	June 30, 2006	8	Victoriaville, Quebec, CAN
36	TKO Major League 25: Confrontation	May 5, 2006	10	Montreal, Quebec, CAN
35	TKO Major League 24: Eruption	January 28, 2006	8	Laval, Quebec, CAN
34	TKO Major League 23: Extreme	November 5, 2005	8	Victoriaville, Quebec, CAN
33	TKO Major League 22: Lionheart	September 30, 2005	8	Montreal, Quebec, CAN
32	TKO Major League 21: Collision	July 15, 2005	9	Montreal, Quebec, CAN
31	TKO Major League 20: Champion vs. Champion	April 2, 2005	9	Montreal, Quebec, Canada
30	TKO Major League 19: Rage	January 29, 2005	7	Montreal, Quebec, Canada
29	TKO Major League 18: Impact	November 26, 2004	11	Montreal, Quebec, CAN
28	TKO Major League 17: Revenge	September 25, 2004	13	Victoriaville, Quebec, CAN
27	TKO Major League 16: Infernal	May 22, 2004	10	Quebec City, Quebec, CAN
26	TKO Major League: Future Stars	March 24, 2004	9	Victoriaville, Quebec, CAN
25	TKO Major League 15: Unstoppable	February 28, 2004	12	Montreal, Quebec, CAN
24	TKO Major League 14: Road Warriors	November 29, 2003	9	Victoriaville, Quebec, CAN
23	TKO Major League 13: Ultimate Rush	September 6, 2003	13	Montreal, Quebec, CAN
22	TKO Major League PG 9: Proving Ground 9	March 22, 2003	11	Victoriaville, Quebec, CAN
21	TKO Major League 12: Adrenaline	January 25, 2003	11	Montreal, Quebec, CAN
20	TKO Major League PG 8: Proving Ground 8	November 3, 2002	10	Victoriaville, Quebec, CAN
19	TKO Major League 11: The Next Level	October 11, 2002	9	Montreal, Quebec, CAN
18	TKO Major League PG 7: Proving Ground 7	September 28, 2002	8	Victoriaville, Quebec, CAN
17	TKO Major League Hawaii: Eruption in Hawaii	September 17, 2002	9	Honolulu, Hawaii U.S.
16	TKO Major League PG 6: Proving Ground 6	July 21, 2002	9	Montreal, Quebec, CAN
15	TKO Major League 10: Battle For The Belts 2002	June 15, 2002	11	Montreal, Quebec, CAN
14	TKO Major League 8	2002	(event cancelled)	Quebec City, Quebec, CAN
13	TKO Major League PG 5: Proving Ground 5	May 19, 2002	9	Sherbrooke, Quebec, CAN
12	TKO Major League 8: Fast And Furious	March 30, 2002	12	Rimouski, Quebec, CAN
11	TKO Major League PG 4: Proving Ground 4	March 9, 2002	8	Victoriaville, Quebec, CAN
10	TKO Major League PG 3: Proving Ground 3	February 24, 2002	9	Saint-Jean, Quebec, CAN
9	TKO Major League 7: Bad Boyz	January 25, 2002	12	Montreal, Quebec, CAN
8	TKO Major League PG 2: Proving Ground 2	December 16, 2001	11	Saint-Jean, Quebec, CAN
7	TKO Major League PG 1: Proving Ground 1	October 28, 2001	5(confirm)	Saint-Jean, Quebec, CAN
6	TKO Major League 6: Redemption	October 19, 2001	10	Montreal, Quebec, CAN
5	TKO Major League 5: Heatwave 2001	June 30, 2001	1(event cancelled due to bad weather)	Quebec City, Quebec, CAN
4	TKO Major League 4: Return Of The Super Strikers	May 12, 2001	11	Sherbrooke, Quebec, CAN
3	TKO Major League 3: Battle For The Belts	January 27, 2001	13	Sherbrooke, Quebec, CAN
2	TKO Major League 2: Moment of Truth	August 12, 2000	9	Montreal, Quebec, CAN
1	TKO Major League 1: The New Beginning	June 2, 2000	10	Montreal, Quebec, CAN

== Return ==
The company's return to action would be announced with TKO 36: Resurrection on November 4, 2016. This coming after 8 years of inactivity. With founder Stephane Patry returning it quickly regained its status as one of the top Mixed Martial Arts promotions in Canada. Since then it has held 14 event's all in Quebec, the return would see the introduction of new weight classes including female weight classes which had previously been absent from the promotion.

== Broadcast deal ==
In August 2016 it was announced that TKO Major League and the Ultimate Fighting Championship had signed a deal for TKO events to be broadcast on the UFC's digital streaming service, UFC Fight Pass. TKO MMA had its first event on Fightpass on November 4, 2016. The promotion also acts as a feeder organization for the UFC with the company often offering contracts to TKO Major League Champions. The prelims still air on Fight Network.

== Current issues ==
In 2019, TKO Major League had to cancel TKO Major League 46: Pessoa vs. Gane due to 18 fighter's being injured or ill well trying to book the card. The Second incident occurred when President of the organization Stephane Patry was hospitalized, the promotion had to cancel its second event of the year TKO Major League 49: Matsuba vs. Gordan postponing it. The COVID-19 pandemic would force the organization to remain inactive from 2020 to 2021, as the company decided to restructure before returning to action. Athletes under contract with TKO have all obtained permission to fight outside of organization during this time, athletes with valid contracts have not left TKO.

== Champions ==
Division	Upper weight limit	Champion	Since	Title Defenses
Heavyweight	265 lb (120 kg)	(France) Ciryl Gane	Signed with UFC	2
Light Heavyweight	205 lb (93 kg)	(Canada) Marc-André Barriault	Signed with UFC	0
Middleweight	185 lb (84 kg)	(Canada) Marc-André Barriault	Signed with UFC	1
Welterweight	170 lb (77 kg)	(Canada) Jesse Ronson	Signed with UFC	0
Lightweight	155 lb (70 kg)	(Canada) Jesse Ronson	Signed with UFC	0
Featherweight	145 lb (66 kg)	(Canada) Charles Jourdain	Signed with UFC	0
Bantamweight	135 lb (61 kg)	(France) Taylor Lapilus	Signed with UFC & PFL	0
Flyweight	125 lb (57 kg)	(Canada) Malcolm Gordon	Signed with UFC	0
Women's Bantamweight	135 lb (61 kg)	Vacant		
Women's Flyweight	125 lb (57 kg)	(Germany) Mandy Böhm	Signed with UFC	0
Women's Strawweight	115 lb (52 kg)	(Canada) Ashley Nichols	June 16, 2016 (TKO 39)	0

=== TKO World Championship history ===
==== TKO World Heavyweight Championship ====
120 kg (265 lb)

No.	Name	Event	Date	Defenses
Dave Beneteau and Elvis Sinosic fought to a draw on June 2, 2000 at TKO Major League 1: The New Beginning for the inaugural title.
1	(United States) Sean Alvarez def. Mike Radnov	TKO Major League 10: Battle For The Belts 2002; Montreal, Quebec, Canada	June 15, 2002	
Alvarez vacated to compete for the UFC.
2	(Canada) Jacob Conliffe promoted to world champion in 2005	TKO Major League 20: Champion vs. Champion; Montreal, Quebec, Canada	April 2, 2005	
3	(Canada) Icho Larenas	TKO Major League 20: Champion vs. Champion; Montreal, Quebec, Canada	April 2, 2005	
4	(Poland) Krzysztof Soszynski	TKO Major League 27: Reincarnation; Montreal, Quebec, Canada	September 29, 2006	
Soszynski vacated to compete for the UFC.
The promotion was on hiatus 2008–2016.
Adam Dyczka and Bakary Sakho fought to a no contest on December 8, 2017 at TKO Major League 41: Champions for the vacant title.
5	(France) Ciryl Gane def. Bobby Sullivan	TKO Major League: TKO Fight Night 1 Montreal, Quebec, Canada	August 2, 2018	1. def. Adam Dyczka at TKO Major League 44: Hunter vs. Barriault on Sept. 29, 2018; 2. def. Roggers Souza at TKO Major League 48: Souza vs. Gane on May. 24, 2019
Gane vacated the title when he signed with the UFC.

==== TKO World Light Heavyweight Championship ====
93 kg (205 lb)

No.	Name	Event	Date	Defenses
1	(Canada) Stephan Potvin def. Rob Tallack	TKO Major League 1: The New Beginning; Montreal, Quebec, Canada	June 2, 2000	1. def. Barney Schisler at TKO Major League 3: Battle For The Belts on Jan. 27, 2001; 2. def. Joe Doerksen at TKO Major League 6: Redemption on Oct. 19, 2001
2	(United States) Jeremy Horn	TKO Major League 7: Bad Boyz; Montreal, Quebec, Canada	January 25, 2002	
The promotion was on hiatus 2008–2016.
3	(Canada) Marc-André Barriault def. Adam Hunter	Montreal, Quebec, Canada	September 29, 2018	
Barriault vacated to sign with the UFC.

==== TKO World Middleweight Championship ====
84 kg (185 lb)

No.	Name	Event	Date	Defenses
1	(Brazil) Claudionor da Silva Fontinelle def. Dirk Waardenburg	TKO Major League 1: The New Beginning; Montreal, Quebec, Canada	June 2, 2000	1. def. Tadarius Thomas TKO Major League 3: Battle For The Belts at on Jan. 27, 2001
2	(Canada) Donald Ouimet	TKO Major League 4: Return Of The Super Strikers; Sherbrooke, Quebec, Canada	May 12, 2001	
3	(United States) Jesse Jones	TKO Major League 8: Fast And Furious; Rimouski, Quebec, Canada	March 30, 2002	
4	(Canada) David Loiseau	TKO Major League 11: The Next Level; Sherbrooke, Quebec, Canada	October 11, 2002	1. def. Tony Fryklund at TKO Major League 12: Adrenaline on Jan. 25, 2003
5	(United States) Jeremy Horn	TKO Major League 15: Unstoppable; Montreal, Quebec, Canada	February 28, 2004	Signed with UFC in 2005
Horn vacated to sign with the UFC.
6	(Canada) Patrick Côte def. Jason Day	TKO Major League 29: Repercussion; Montreal Quebec, Canada	June 1, 2007	
Cote vacated to sign with the UFC.
The promotion was on hiatus 2008–2016.
7	(Canada) Marc-André Barriault def. Strahinja Gavrilovic	TKO Major League 41: Champions; Montreal, Quebec, Canada	December 8, 2017	1. def. Brendan Kornberger at TKO Major League 43: Barriault vs. Kornberger on May 4, 2018
Barriault vacated when he signed with the UFC.

==== TKO World Welterweight Championship ====
77 kg (170 lb)

No.	Name	Event	Date	Defenses
1	(Canada) John Alessio def. Sean Pierson	TKO Major League 7: Bad Boyz; Montreal, Quebec, Canada	January 25, 2002	
2	(United States) Jason Black	TKO Major League 12: Adrenaline; Montreal, Quebec, Canada	January 25, 2003	i
Black vacated.
3	(Canada) Jesse Bongfeldt def. Chris Clements	TKO Major League 30: Apocalypse; Montreal, Quebec, Canada	September 28, 2007	1. def. TJ Grant at TKO Major League 32: Ultimatum on February 28, 2008
Promotion was on hiatus from 2008 to 2016.
4	(Canada) Jesse Ronson def. Micheal Dufort	TKO Major League 44: Hunter vs. Barriault; Quebec City, Quebec, Canada	September 29, 2018	
Ronson vacated title when he signed with PFL.

==== TKO World Lightweight Championship ====
70 kg (155 lb)

No.	Name	Event	Date	Defenses
1	(Canada) Sean Pierson def. Charles Ali Nestor	TKO Major League 3: Battle For The Belts; Sherbrooke, Quebec, Canada	January 27, 2001	
Pierson vacated to compete at welterweight.
2	(United States) Duane Ludwig def. Jens Pulver	TKO Major League 11: The Next Level; Montreal, Quebec, Canada	October 11, 2002	
Ludwig vacated to compete for the UFC.
3	(Canada) Donald Ouimet def. James Martinez	TKO Major League 20: Champion vs. Champion; Montreal, Quebec, Canada	April 2, 2005	
4	(Canada) Sam Stout	TKO Major League 21: Collision; Montreal, Quebec, Canada	July 15, 2005	1. def. Donald Ouimet at TKO Major League 23: Extreme on November 5, 2005; 2. def. Jay Estrada TKO Major League 27: Reincarnation at on Sept. 29, 2006; 3. def. Fabio Holanda at TKO Major League 28: Inevitable on February 9, 2006; 4. def. Martin Grandmont at TKO Major League 30: Apocalypseon Sept. 28, 2007
Stout vacated when he signed with UFC.
Promotion was on hiatus from 2008 to 2016.
5	(Canada) Jesse Ronson def. Derek Gauthier	TKO Major League 41: Champions; Montreal, Quebec, Canada	December 8, 2017	
Ronson vacated the title when he signed with PFL.

==== TKO World Featherweight Championship ====
70 kg (145 lb)
Prior to TKO Major League 24: Eruption, the 145 lbs division was known as Super Lightweight.

No.	Name	Event	Date	Defenses
1	(Brazil) Wagnney Fabiano def. Charles Ali Nestor	TKO Major League 1: The New Beginning; Montreal, Quebec, Canada	June 2, 2000	1. def. Tommy Lee at TKO Major League 16: Infernal on May. 22, 2004
Vacated title in 2005.
2	(Canada) Mark Hominick def. Stephane Vigneault	TKO Major League 20: Champion vs. Champion; Laval, Quebec, Canada	April 2, 2005	1. def. Ryan Diaz At TKO Major League 22: Lionheart on Sept. 30, 2005; 2. def. Naoji Fujimoto at TKO Major League 24: Eruption on Jan. 28, 2006
3	(Japan) Hatsu Hioki	TKO Major League 25: Confrontation; Montreal, Quebec, Canada	May 5, 2006	1. def. Mark Hominick at TKO Major League 28: Inevitable on February 1, 2007; 2. def. Thierry Quenneville at TKO Major League 35: Quenneville vs. Hioki on October 3, 2008
The promotion was on hiatus 2008–2016.
4	(Canada) T.J. Laramie def. Charles Jourdain	TKO Major League 41: Champions; Montreal, Quebec, Canada	December 8, 2017	1. def. João Luis Nogueira at TKO Major League 42: Nogueira vs. Laramie on Mar. 16, 2018
5	(Canada) Alex Morgan	TKO Major League :TKO Fight Night 1 Montreal, Quebec, Canada	August 2, 2018	
6	(Canada) Charles Jourdain	TKO Major League 45: Jourdain vs. Morgan; Montreal, Quebec, Canada	December 7, 2018	1. def. Damien Lapilus at TKO Major League 47: Jourdain vs. Lapilus on Apr. 11, 2019
Jourdain vacated the title when he signed with the UFC.

==== TKO World Bantamweight Championship ====
61 kg (135 lb)

No.	Name	Event	Date	Defenses
1	(Canada) Adrian Wooley def. Danny Martinez	TKO Major League 34: Sims vs. Bosse; Montreal, Quebec, Canada	June 7, 2008	
2	(United States) Noah Thomas	TKO Major League 35: Quenneville vs. Hioki; Quebec City, Quebec, Canada	October 3, 2008	
The promotion was on hiatus 2008–2016.
3	(Canada) Jesse Arnett def. Dimitri Waardenburg	TKO Major League 42: Nogueira vs. Laramie; Laval, Quebec, Canada	December 8, 2017	1. def. Sebastian Ruiz at TKO Major League 43: Barriault vs. Kornberger on May 4, 2018
4	(United States) Nate Maness	TKO Major League 44: Hunter vs. Barriault; Quebec City, Quebec, Canada	September 29, 2018	
5	(France) Taylor Lapilus	TKO Major League 48: Souza vs. Gane; Gatineau, Quebec, Canada	May 24, 2019	

==== TKO World Flyweight Championship ====
57 kg (125 lb)

No.	Name	Event	Date	Defenses
1	(Canada) Malcolm Gordon def. Jordan Graham	TKO Major League 42: Nogueira vs. Laramie; Laval, Quebec, Canada	February 16, 2018	1. def. James Mancini at TKO Major League :TKO Fight Night 1 on August 2, 2018; 2. def. Yoni Sherbatov at TKO Major League 47: Jourdain vs. Lapilus on Apr. 11, 2019
Gordon vacated the title when he signed with the UFC.

==== TKO World Women's Flyweight Championship ====
57 kg (125 lb)

No.	Name	Event	Date	Defenses
1	(Germany) Mandy Böhm def. Jade Masson-Wong	TKO Major League 48: Sousa vs Gane; Gatineau, Quebec, Canada	May 24, 2019	

==== TKO Women's Strawweight Championship ====
52 kg (115 lb)

No.	Name	Event	Date	Defenses
1	(Canada) Ashley Nichols def. Lindsay Garbatt	TKO Major League 39: Ultimatum; Saint-Roch-de-l'Achigan, Quebec, Canada	June 16, 2016	
Nichols vacated.

=== TKO Canadian Championship History ===
==== TKO Canadian Heavyweight Championship ====
120 kg (265 lb)

No.	Name	Event	Date	Defenses
1	(Canada) Jacob Conliffe def. Todd Gouwenburg	TKO Major League 18: Impact; Montreal, Quebec, Canada	November 26, 2004	
Title unified with the World Heavyweight Championship in 2005.

==== TKO Canadian Light Heavyweight Championship ====
93 kg (205 lb)

No.	Name	Event	Date	Defenses
1	(Canada) Jeromie Sills def. Stephan Potvin	TKO Major League 3: Battle For The Belts; Sherbrooke, Quebec, Canada	January 27, 2001	
2	(Canada) Gary Armburst	TKO Major League 4: Return Of The Super Strikers; Sherbrooke, Quebec, Canada	May 4, 2001	
Relinquished title and retired 6–0.
3	(Canada) Jeromie Sills def. Yan Pellerin	TKO Major League 7: Bad Boyz; Montreal, Quebec, Canada	January 25, 2002	
4	(Canada) Steve Vigneault	TKO Major League 10: Battle For The Belts 2002; Montreal, Quebec, Canada	June 15, 2002	
5	(Canada) Patrick Côte	TKO Major League 14: Road Warriors; Victoriaville, Quebec, Canada	November 29, 2003	1. def. Bill Manhood at TKO Major League 16: Infernal on May. 22, 2004; 2. def. Ricardeau Francois at TKO Major League 19: Rage on Jan. 29, 2005
Title unified with the World Light Heavyweight Championship in 2005.

==== TKO Canadian Middleweight Championship ====
84 kg (185 lb)

No.	Name	Event	Date	Defenses
1	(Canada) David Loiseau def. Steve Vigneault	TKO Major League 2: Moment of Truth; Montreal, Quebec, Canada	August 12, 2000	
2	(Canada) Jason St.Louis	TKO Major League 3: Battle For The Belts; Montreal, Quebec, Canada	January 27, 2001	
3	(Canada) Steve Vigneault	TKO Major League 4: Return Of The Super Strikers; Sherbrooke, Quebec, Canada	May 12, 2001	1. def. Mike Kitchen at TKO Major League 6: Redemption on Oct. 19, 2001; 2. def. J.P. Cantin at TKO Major League 8: Fast And Furious on Mar. 30, 2002; 3. def. Sean Pierson at TKO Major League 13: Ultimate Rush on September 6, 2003
4	(Canada) Chris Fontaine	TKO Major League 15: Unstoppable; Montreal, Quebec, Canada	February 28, 2004	
5	(Canada) David Loiseau	TKO Major League 16: Infernal; Quebec City, Quebec, Canada	May 24, 2004	
Title unified with the World Middleweight Championship in 2005.

==== TKO Canadian Welterweight Championship ====
77 kg (170 lb)

No.	Name	Event	Date	Defenses
1	(Canada) Justin Bruckmann def. Joel Leblanc	TKO Major League 8: Fast And Furious; Rimouski, Quebec, Canada	March 30, 2002	
2	(Canada) Georges St-Pierre	TKO Major League 10: Battle For The Belts 2002; Montreal, Quebec, Canada	June 15, 2002	1. def. Travis Galbraith at TKO Major League 11: The Next Level on Oct. 11, 2002; 2. def. Dave Strasser at TKO 19: Rage on Jan 19, 2005.
St-Pierre vacated to sign with the UFC.
Title unified with the World Welterweight Championship in 2005.

==== TKO Canadian Lightweight Championship ====
70 kg (155 lb)

No.	Name	Event	Date	Defenses
1	(Canada) J.F. Bolduc def. J.T. McCrathy	TKO Major League 2: Moment of Truth; Montreal, Quebec, Canada	August 12, 2000	
2	(Canada) Phil Hughes	TKO Major League 3: Battle For The Belts; Sherbrooke, Quebec, Canada	January 27, 2001	
3	(Canada) Justin Bruckmann	TKO Major League 6: Redemption; Montreal, Quebec, Canada	October 19, 2001	
Bruckmann went up to Welterweight then eventually vacated the title
4	(Canada) Dave Goulet def. Shawn Davidson	TKO Major League 14: Road Warriors; Victoriaville, Quebec, Canada	November 29, 2003	
5	(Canada) Donald Ouimet	TKO Major League 16: Infernal; Quebec City, Quebec, Canada	May 22, 2004	1. def. Dave Goulet at TKO Major League 17: Revenge on Sept. 25, 2004; 2. def. Blake Fredrickson at TKO Major League 18: Impact on Nov. 26, 2004
Promoted to TKO World Lightweight Championship during unification in 2005.

==== TKO Canadian Super Lightweight Championship ====
70 kg (145 lb)

No.	Name	Event	Date	Defenses
1	(Canada) Richard Nancoo def. Jay Winger	TKO Major League 3: Battle For The Belts; Sherbrooke, Quebec, Canada	January 25, 2001	1. def. Yves Jabouin at TKO Major League 6: Redemption on Oct. 19, 2001; 2. def. Steve Claveau at TKO Major League 8: Fast And Furious on Mar. 30, 2002
2	(Canada) Mark Hominick	TKO Major League 10: Battle For The Belts 2002; Montreal, Quebec, Canada	June 15, 2002	1. def. Steve Claveau at TKO Major League 11: The Next Level on Oct. 11, 2002; 2. def. Stephane Laliberte at TKO Major League 12: Adrenaline on Jan. 25, 2003; 3. def. Ryan Diaz at TKO Major League 13: Ultimate Rush on September 6, 2003; 4. def. David Guigui at TKO Major League 15: Unstoppable on Feb. 28, 2004
3	(Canada) Shane Rice	TKO Major League 17: Revenge; Victoriaville, Quebec, Canada	September 25, 2004	
Rice vacated the title due to injury.
4	(Canada) Stephane Vigneault def. Phillipe Lagace	TKO Major League 18: Impact; Montreal, Quebec, Canada	November 26, 2004	N/A
Vigneault vacated.
5	(Canada) Mark Hominick def. Shane Rice	TKO Major League 19: Rage; Montreal, Quebec, Canada	January 25, 2005	
Promoted to TKO World Super Lightweight Championship during unification in 2005.

== Notable alumni ==
(Canada) Georges St-Pierre
(Canada) Jonathan Goulet
(United States) Jeremy Horn
(United States) Duane Ludwig
(Canada) Sean Pierson
(Australia) Elvis Sinosic
(Canada) Dave Beneteau
(United States) Rich Franklin
(El Salvador) Ivan Menjivar
(United States) Urijah Faber
(Canada) David Loiseau
(United States) Baret Yoshida
(Canada) Justin Bruckmann
(Brazil) Wagnney Fabiano
(Canada) Steve Vigneault
(United States) Jens Pulver
(United States) Sean Sherk
(Japan) Hatsu Hioki
(Canada) John Alessio
(Canada) Joe Doerksen
(United States) Shonie Carter
(Canada) Patrick Côte
(United States) Jason Black
(United States) Jeff Curran
(Canada) Mark Hominick
(Canada) Sam Stout
(Canada) Chris Horodecki
(United States) Tony Fryklund
(Canada) Chris Clements
(Canada) Steve Bossé
(Poland) Krzysztof Soszynski
(France) Ciryl Gane
(Canada) Jesse Ronson
(Canada) Charles Jourdain
(Canada) Marc-André Barriault
(United States) Nate Maness
(France) Taylor Lapilus
Malcolm Gordon
