= Georges St-Pierre =

Canadian mixed martial arts fighter

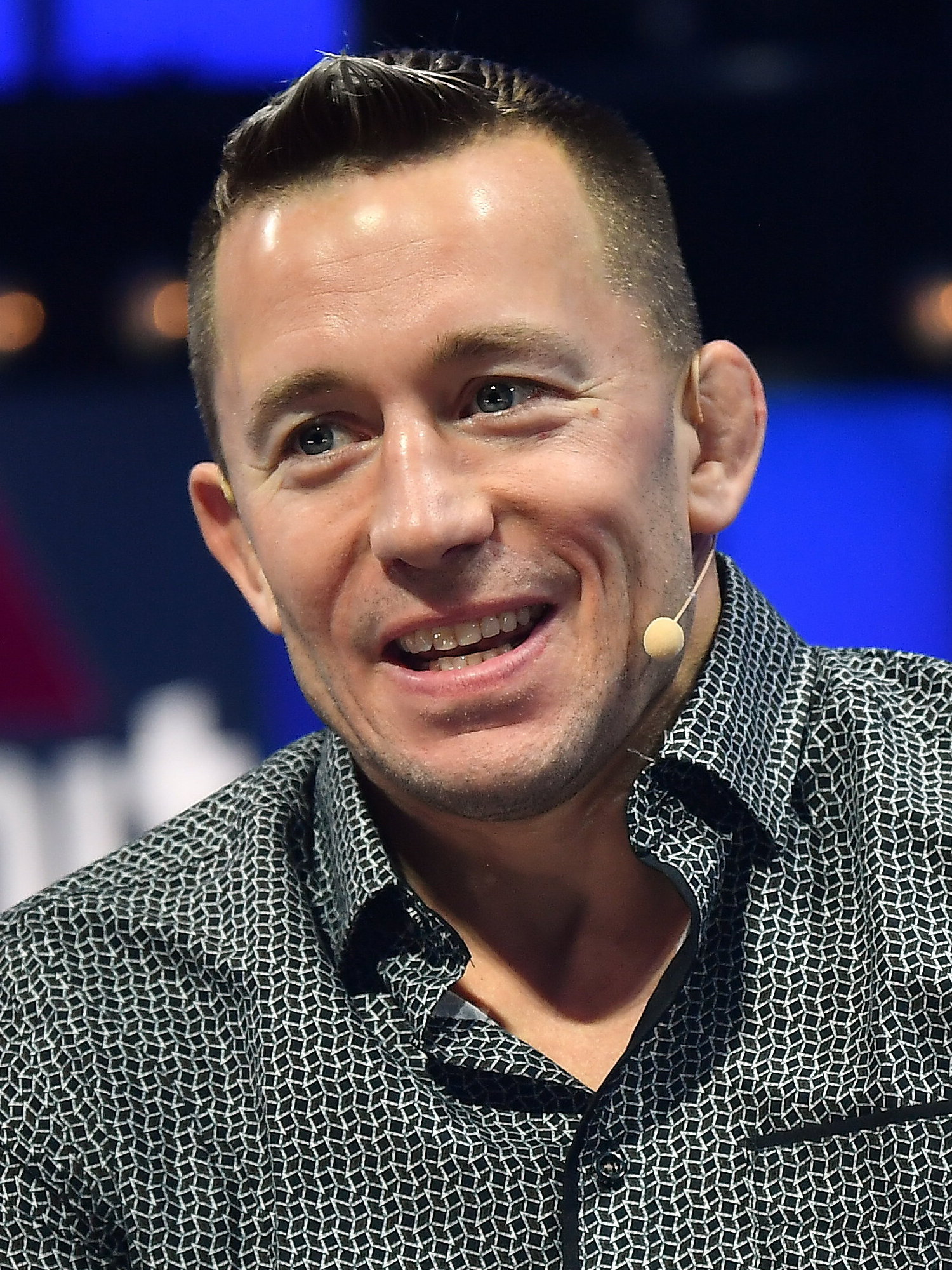
- St-Pierre in 2021
- Born: May 19, 1981 (age 45); Saint-Isidore, Montérégie, Quebec, Canada
- Nickname: Rush
- Height: 5 ft 10 in (1.78 m)
- Weight: 170 lb (77 kg; 12 st)
- Division: Welterweight (2002–2013); Middleweight (2017)
- Reach: 76 in (193 cm)
- Fighting out of: Montreal, Quebec, Canada
- Team: Jackson Wink MMA Academy; Tristar Gym; Grudge Training Center; Renzo Gracie Academy
- Trainer: Head Trainer: Firas Zahabi; Strategy: Greg Jackson; Wrestling: Victor Zilberman, Guivi Sissaouri; Boxing: Howard Grant, Freddie Roach; Muay Thai: Ajarn Phil Nurse; Brazilian Jiu-Jitsu: John Danaher, Bruno Fernandes, Renzo Gracie; Strength: Pierre Roy; Gymnastics: Patrick Beauchamp
- Rank: 3rd dan black belt in Kyokushin Karate; First degree black belt in Brazilian jiu-jitsu under Bruno Fernandes; Black belt in Shotokan; Black belt in Shidōkan; Black belt in Gaidojutsu
- Years active: 2002–2013, 2017 (MMA)

Mixed martial arts record
- Total: 28
- Wins: 26
- By knockout: 8
- By submission: 6
- By decision: 12
- Losses: 2
- By knockout: 1
- By submission: 1

Other information
- University: Cégep Édouard-Montpetit
- Notable school: École Pierre-Bédard
- Website: gspofficial.com
- Mixed martial arts record from Sherdog

YouTube information
- Channel: officialGSP
- Subscribers: 50 thousand
- Views: 8 million
- Last updated: January 16, 2026

Georges St-Pierre CM (French pronunciation: [ʒɔʁʒ sɛ̃ pjɛʁ]; born May 19, 1981), also known by his initials GSP, is a Canadian former professional mixed martial artist. He is widely regarded as one of the greatest fighters in mixed martial arts (MMA) history. St-Pierre was a two-division champion in the Ultimate Fighting Championship (UFC), winning titles in the welterweight and middleweight divisions.

St-Pierre is a three-time former UFC Welterweight Champion, winning the title twice and the interim title once between November 2006 and April 2008. He was ranked as the #1 welterweight in the world for several years by Sherdog and other publications. In 2008, 2009, and 2010, he was named the Canadian Athlete of the Year by Rogers Sportsnet. Fight Matrix lists him as the top MMA welterweight of all time and the most accomplished fighter in MMA history. He was voted as the greatest pound-for-pound MMA fighter in history in The Athletic MMA fighter survey. He still holds several UFC welterweight records, including the most title-fight victories (12), the most successful title defenses (9), highest significant strike defense percentage (73.1%), highest takedown accuracy (73.7%), and the most takedowns landed (87). St-Pierre also holds the UFC records for most control time (2:42:04) and most top position time (2:22:05).

St-Pierre retired as the reigning welterweight champion in December 2013, having held the record for most wins in title bouts and the second longest combined title streak in UFC history (2,204 days) while defending his title nine consecutive times. He also won a record 33 consecutive rounds between 2007 to 2011. He returned to the Octagon in November 2017 at UFC 217, when he defeated Michael Bisping by submission to win the middleweight title, thus becoming the fourth fighter in the UFC to be a multi-division champion. He relinquished the title a few weeks later, citing health reasons, and officially retired from MMA.

Outside his competitive fighting career, St-Pierre has appeared in several films, such as the martial arts film Kickboxer: Vengeance (2016), the superhero film Captain America: The Winter Soldier (2014), and the action films Cartels (2017) and King of Killers (2023).

== Early life ==
St-Pierre was born in Saint-Isidore, Montérégie, Quebec, to Roland and Pauline St-Pierre on May 19, 1981. St-Pierre has two younger sisters. St-Pierre had a difficult childhood, attending a school where others would steal his clothes and money. As a child he played hockey, skated and participated in several sports. He began learning Kyokushin Karate at age seven to defend himself against a school bully. St-Pierre attended high school at École Pierre-Bédard where he held the school record for number of chin-ups done. After graduation he enrolled in kinesiology studies at Cégep Édouard-Montpetit. Before turning pro as a mixed martial artist, St-Pierre worked as a bouncer at a Montreal night club in the South Shore called Fuzzy Brossard and as a garbageman for six months to pay for his school fees. Already a 2nd dan Kyokushin karate black belt at age 12, his first professional fight was at age 20.

As a youth, St-Pierre was inspired by Jean-Claude Van Damme, and described fighting him in the film Kickboxer: Vengeance as "a dream come true".

== Training ==
St-Pierre has trained with a number of groups in a large variety of gyms throughout his fighting career. He began wrestling training between 19 and 20 years of age at the Reinitz Wrestling Center's Montreal Wrestling Club headed by Victor Zilberman, and continued training there until the end of his career. He was also coached by world champion Guivi Sissaouri. St-Pierre became known for having strong wrestling ability and went on to out-wrestle several fighters who had been accomplished wrestlers. He trained extensively with members of the Canadian national wrestling team and intended to pursue a place on the team for the 2008 and 2012 Olympics but was negated each time by his commitments as UFC Welterweight Champion.

Prior to his fight with B.J. Penn at UFC 58, he trained at the Renzo Gracie Jiu-Jitsu Academy in New York City. St-Pierre received his brown belt in BJJ from Renzo Gracie on July 21, 2006. In September 2008, St-Pierre earned his black belt in Brazilian jiu-jitsu under Bruno Fernandes.

St-Pierre began training with Rashad Evans, Nathan Marquardt, Keith Jardine, Donald Cerrone and other mixed martial arts fighters at Greg Jackson's Submission Fighting Gaidojutsu school in New Mexico. Some of Jackson's students accompanied St-Pierre to Montreal to help prepare him for his fight at UFC 94 against B.J. Penn at the Tristar Gym, including Keith Jardine, Nathan Marquardt, Donald Cerrone, and Rashad Evans. St-Pierre's strength and conditioning coach was Jonathan Chaimberg of Adrenaline Performance Centre in Montréal; his Head Trainer was Firas Zahabi of Zahabi MMA, out of the Tristar gym. The two cornered all of St-Pierre's later bouts and remain his close friends. Between 2006 and 2009, St-Pierre trained in Muay Thai under Phil Nurse at the Wat in New York City.

== Mixed martial arts career ==
=== Ultimate Fighting Championship ===
==== Early fights and The Ultimate Fighter coach ====
St-Pierre made his Ultimate Fighting Championship (UFC) debut at UFC 46, where he defeated highly ranked Karo Parisyan by unanimous decision (29–28, 30–27, and 30–27). His next fight in the UFC was against Jay Hieron at UFC 48. St-Pierre defeated Hieron via Technical knockout in only 1:42 of the first round.

Following his second win in the UFC, he faced Matt Hughes at UFC 50 for the vacant UFC Welterweight Championship. Despite a competitive performance against the much more experienced fighter, St-Pierre tapped out to an armbar with only 10 seconds remaining in the first round. The loss was the first of St-Pierre's career; he stated later that he was in awe of Hughes going into the title bout.

After his loss to Matt Hughes, St-Pierre rebounded with a win over Dave Strasser at TKO 19 by a first–round kimura submission. He then returned to the UFC to face Jason Miller at UFC 52, defeating Miller by unanimous decision (30–27, 30–27, and 30–27).

St-Pierre was then matched up against top contender Frank Trigg at UFC 54. St-Pierre controlled the fight and won via rear-naked choke with less than a minute remaining in the first round. He then faced future lightweight champion Sean Sherk at UFC 56. Midway through the second round, St-Pierre became the second fighter to defeat Sherk and the first to finish him. During the post-fight interview, he went down on his knees with an impassioned plea to UFC management to give him another title shot.

At UFC 58, St-Pierre defeated former UFC welterweight champion B.J. Penn to become the No. 1 contender for the UFC welterweight title. St-Pierre won the match by split decision and was set for a rematch against then–champion Matt Hughes at UFC 63. St-Pierre was forced to withdraw from the match, however, due to a groin injury, and was replaced by the man he defeated in March, B.J. Penn. The UFC announced afterwards that St-Pierre would have the opportunity to fight for the title when his condition was fully healed.

St-Pierre was seen as a trainer on The Ultimate Fighter 4: The Comeback on Spike TV, which featured fighters who were previously seen in UFC events including Matt Serra, Shonie Carter, Pete Sell, Patrick Côté, and Travis Lutter. St-Pierre was seen vocally supporting fellow Canadian and training partner Patrick Côté during the season's airing.

==== Winning and losing the Welterweight Championship ====
At UFC 63, St-Pierre made an appearance to support fellow Canadian David "The Crow" Loiseau. At that time he was seen pushing Loiseau to "fight his fight" against Mike Swick. At the same event, after Matt Hughes had defeated B.J. Penn, St-Pierre stepped into the cage to hype up his upcoming title fight against Hughes, stating that he was glad that Hughes won his fight, but that he was "not impressed" by Hughes's performance.

According to both commentator Joe Rogan and Hughes's own autobiography, Hughes was unhappy with St-Pierre's statement. Hughes said that they "had words" off-camera shortly after, at which time St-Pierre apologized, saying he had misunderstood something Hughes had said on the microphone and did not mean to offend him. St-Pierre challenged Matt Hughes again at UFC 65 for the UFC Welterweight Championship. The fight was almost stopped near the end of the first round when St-Pierre sent Hughes to the mat with a superman punch and left hook, but Hughes managed to survive the first round. In the second round, St-Pierre won the fight via technical knockout after a left kick to Hughes's head followed by a barrage of unanswered punches and elbows. This fight earned him a Knockout of the Night award. After the fight, on January 30, 2007, St-Pierre signed a new six-fight deal with the UFC.

At UFC 69 in 2007, St-Pierre suffered only his second (and last, as of his official retirement in 2019) loss in MMA, when he lost the welterweight title to The Ultimate Fighter 4 winner Matt Serra when Serra forced the referee to step in after a series of unanswered strikes at 3:25 of round one. Matt Serra was an 11–1 underdog going into the bout. St-Pierre has said that he lost the match partially due to a lack of focus because of problems in his personal life, including the death of a close cousin and his father's serious illness, and later parted ways with his manager and most of his entourage. St-Pierre has since gone on to say that he should not have made any excuses and that Serra was simply the better fighter that night.

==== Championship pursuits ====
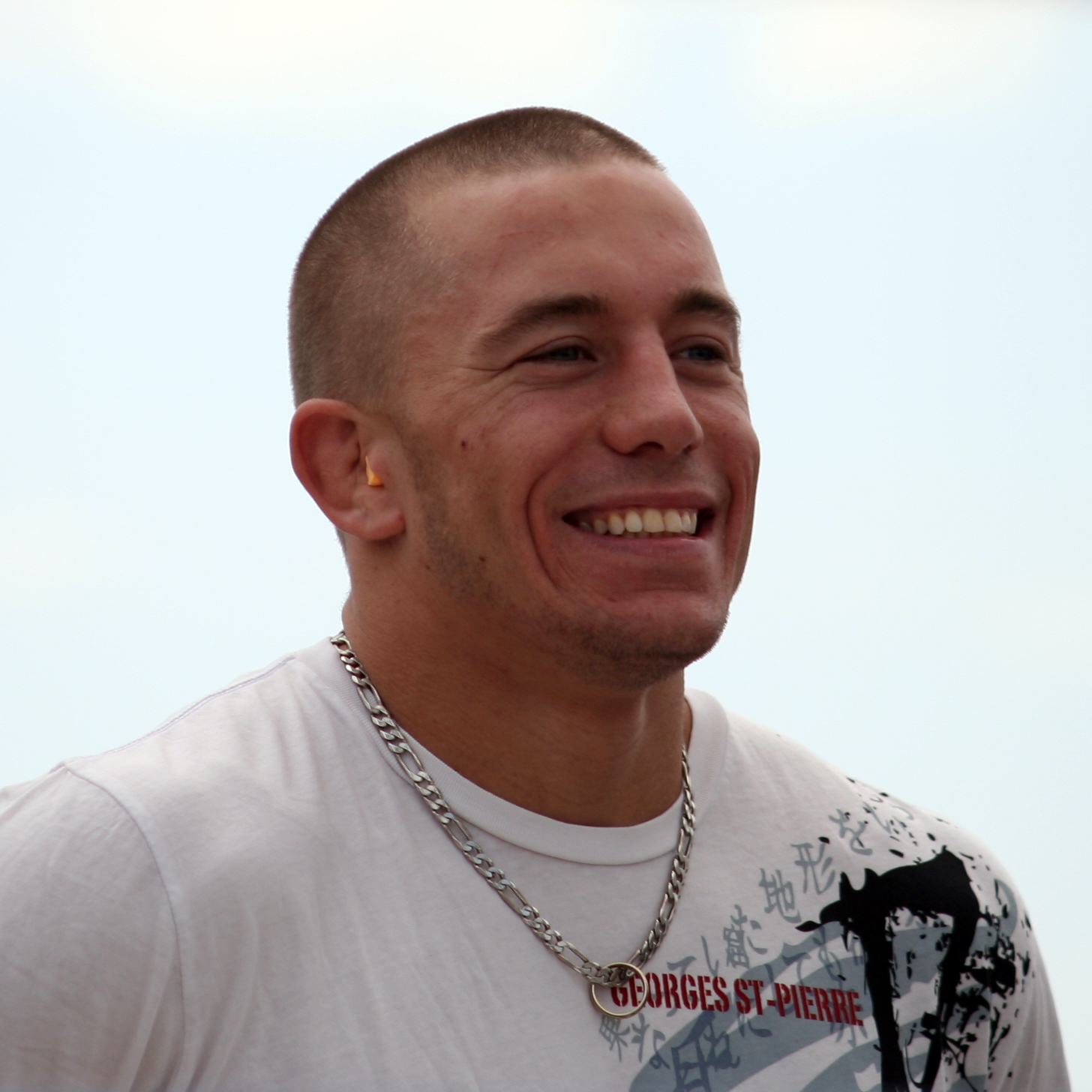
St-Pierre in 2007

On August 25, 2007, at UFC 74, St-Pierre won a unanimous decision (30–27, 29–28, and 29–28) over Josh Koscheck. He outwrestled Koscheck, who is a four-time Division I NCAA All-American and an NCAA wrestling champion, by scoring takedowns, stopping Koscheck's takedown attempts and maintaining top position throughout most of the fight. Many predicted that Koscheck would outmatch St-Pierre on the ground due to his credentials, but St-Pierre was confident that he was a better wrestler and striker and was more well-versed in submissions than Koscheck.

Before and after the fight, St-Pierre stated his intention to reclaim his lost title, miming the act of placing a championship belt around his waist while still in the octagon. His win over Koscheck had placed him in the No. 1 contender spot for the UFC Welterweight Championship. That fight was to be against the winner of Matt Hughes and Matt Serra. Matt Serra had to pull out of UFC 79 due to a back injury sustained during training, and instead St-Pierre faced Hughes in a rubber match for the interim UFC Welterweight Championship. Hughes was unable to mount any serious offence against St-Pierre, who again showcased his wrestling skills by not only avoiding all of Hughes's takedown attempts but also taking Hughes down at will. In a reversal of their first fight, St-Pierre attempted a kimura on Hughes's right arm, then switched to a straight armbar with fifteen seconds left in the second round. Hughes fought the extension, but was forced to submit verbally at 4:55 of the second round, making St-Pierre the interim Welterweight Champion. This fight earned him a Submission of the Night award.

==== Welterweight Championship unification bout ====
At UFC 83 on April 19, 2008, St-Pierre fought Matt Serra in a rematch to determine the undisputed UFC welterweight champion. It was the UFC's first event in Canada and was held at the Bell Centre in Montreal, Québec. Instead of starting with strikes, St-Pierre pressed the action early with a takedown and then mixed up his attack, which never allowed Serra the chance to mount a significant offence. In the second round, St-Pierre continued his previous actions and forced Serra into the turtle position and delivered several knees to Serra's midsection. Near the end of round two, the fight was stopped by referee Yves Lavigne with a visibly fatigued Serra unable to defend himself from St-Pierre's continuous knee blows or improve his position.

In 2008, St-Pierre made the cover of Karaté Bushido, the oldest magazine dedicated to martial arts in Europe, joining martial artists such as Bruce Lee (1974), Jean-Claude Van Damme (1993), Bas Rutten (1997), Rickson Gracie (1998), Jackie Chan (2000), Fedor Emelianenko (2007), Francis Ngannou (2019), and Dave Leduc (2020).

==== Welterweight Championship defences ====
St-Pierre's first title defence after regaining the belt was against Jon Fitch at UFC 87. Fitch was on a 16-fight winning streak and a victory against St-Pierre would have been Fitch's ninth consecutive UFC win, a new UFC record. St-Pierre defeated Fitch by unanimous decision (50–43, 50–44, and 50–44), scoring multiple strikes and taking the former Purdue wrestling captain down seemingly at will. This fight earned him his first Fight of the Night award.

The win over Fitch set up one of the most anticipated rematches in UFC history. B.J. Penn entered the octagon after Fitch's loss and challenged St-Pierre to a rematch of their UFC 58 bout from 2006, which had ended in a split-decision victory for St-Pierre. The rematch took place on January 31, 2009, at UFC 94. The first round of the fight was nearly even, although St-Pierre dominated the rest of the bout, scoring the first takedown of the fight midway through the second round. From that point on, St-Pierre took Penn down at will, repeatedly passed his guard, and persistently punished the Hawaiian with ground-and-pound attacks.

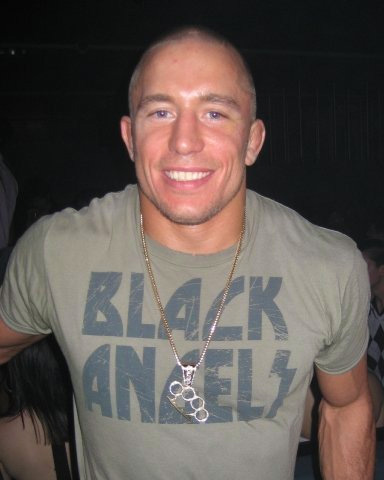
St-Pierre in February 2009

The fight ended after the fourth round when Penn's cornerman, Jason Parillo, requested that the referee stop the fight. Penn failed to attend the post-fight press conference due to hospitalization for injuries. Penn later admitted that he could not recall anything that happened during the 3rd and 4th rounds because "I was probably borderline knocked out or something." During the fight, Penn complained that St-Pierre was too slippery to hold, which led to suspicion about petroleum jelly being illegally applied to St-Pierre's back. The matter was formally investigated by the UFC and Nevada State Athletic Commission upon the request of the Penn camp. Dana White said it was unfortunate GSP's dominant win was overshadowed by the cornerman controversy. "Do I think that he got greased? Yeah, I do," White told The Canadian Press prior to the UFC 95 weigh-in Friday at the Dominion Theatre. "Absolutely, 100 percent, I think that that guy was rubbing grease on him. Do I think Georges was trying to cheat? Absolutely not at all, but that cornerman was rubbing grease on him; you cannot do that."

Prior to UFC 100, Beau Dure of USA Today stated that St-Pierre was possibly "the best in the world." At the event, St-Pierre defeated No. 1 contender Thiago Alves by unanimous decision (50–45, 50–44, and 50–45). Alves showed promise on his feet standing up in the fight, but St-Pierre's wrestling and ground control proved too much for the challenger and put St-Pierre en route to a unanimous decision victory, although St-Pierre injured his groin in the fourth round. On July 18, 2009, it was revealed that St-Pierre's groin injury would not require surgery.

St-Pierre successfully defended his welterweight title against Dan Hardy on March 27, 2010, at UFC 111, which took place in Newark, New Jersey. St-Pierre dominated the fight with his wrestling. He caught Hardy in the first round with an armbar, but Hardy refused to tap and eventually fought out of the hold. In the fourth round St-Pierre caught Hardy in a kimura while in the reverse-mount position, but St-Pierre was again unable to finish Hardy before he was able to escape. St-Pierre went on to win the fight by unanimous decision (50–43, 50–44, and 50–45). After the fight, he stated that he was glad to win but was not happy with his performance, stating that he wanted to finish the fight. St-Pierre received harsh criticism for stalling the fight against Hardy and not being able to finish him.

St-Pierre's next fight was a rematch against Josh Koscheck at UFC 124, which he won by unanimous decision (50–45, 50–45, and 50–45). St-Pierre once again dominated the fight, this time around by use of superior striking and accurate boxing. He landed a total of 55 jabs to Koscheck's head, with Joe Rogan stating that it was "the most jabs I've ever seen in an MMA fight." During the first round, Koscheck's right eye became very swollen from one of St-Pierre's jabs, and by the end of the fight, due to a broken orbital bone, his right eye was completely swollen shut. St-Pierre stated at the post-fight conference that his plan included catching Koscheck off-guard by striking with him rather than wrestling. Despite the eye injury, St-Pierre was unable to finish Koscheck. The fight earned him a $100,000 Fight of the Night award.

UFC president Dana White stated that Jake Shields would be St-Pierre's next opponent and confirmed that the two would meet in the main event of UFC 129 on April 30, 2011, in Toronto. White suggested that if St-Pierre defeated Shields, it could mark a move to middleweight and a superfight against then UFC Middleweight Champion Anderson Silva. St-Pierre defeated Shields via unanimous decision (50–45, 48–47, and 48–47). When asked about fighting Silva during the post-fight interview, St-Pierre stated that he had no desire to pursue it. St-Pierre's record of 33 consecutive rounds won ended in his fight against Shields, and which dated back to UFC 74.

St-Pierre received a 60-day medical suspension following his UFC 129 fight with Shields due to damage to his left eye. Two days after the fight, however, Firas Zahabi, St-Pierre's trainer, said that doctors had declared that his eye had not suffered any serious damage and that he would be able to resume training after 10 days.

At the UFC 129 post-fight press conference, UFC President Dana White stated that St-Pierre could next fight Strikeforce Welterweight champion Nick Diaz. "I've got to go talk him about boxing first, and then we'll see what happens there. It's an interesting fight," White said. "I was there live for that last fight and I was blown away by Nick Diaz's last fight. He looked incredible."

Dana White confirmed via Twitter that St-Pierre's next opponent would be Nick Diaz at UFC 137 at the Mandalay Bay Event Center in Las Vegas, Nevada. However, at the UFC 137 press conference, White announced that Carlos Condit would no longer face B.J. Penn and instead would replace Nick Diaz, who had failed to show up for any event related press appearances. Condit was to face St-Pierre for the UFC Welterweight Title at UFC 137. On October 18, 2011, it was announced that St-Pierre had pulled out of the fight due to a knee injury. After conferring with management and UFC officials, Condit elected not to compete against a replacement fighter at UFC 137, but face St-Pierre in early 2012. In a strange turn of events, Nick Diaz fought and defeated B.J. Penn at UFC 137 and UFC officials decided to have St-Pierre return and fight Diaz at UFC 143. According to White, St-Pierre said "He's [Nick Diaz] the most disrespectful human being I've ever met and I'm going to put the worst beating you've ever seen on him in the UFC."

However, on December 7, 2011, it was revealed St-Pierre had sustained a torn right ACL, an injury which would force him to be out for up to ten months, forcing him out of the bout with Diaz. At UFC 143, in a fight for the UFC Interim Welterweight Championship, Diaz lost to Condit.

St-Pierre was set to return and fight Condit for the undisputed championship on November 17, 2012, at UFC 154. On August 28, 2012, St-Pierre posted to his official Facebook page that he had the green light from his medical team to compete once again. He ended his post by announcing that his return would be in UFC 154, in which he was to fight Carlos Condit.

St-Pierre once again successfully defended his welterweight title on November 17, 2012, at UFC 154 against Condit, winning a unanimous decision (49–46, 50–45, and 50–45). Despite being badly hurt in the third round by a head kick, St-Pierre was able to take and hold down Condit repeatedly during the bout, while defending multiple submission attempts and delivering multiple strikes from Condit's active guard. Both participants earned $70,000 Fight of the Night honors for their performances.

Georges St-Pierre defended his title for the 8th time and defeated Nick Diaz at UFC 158 on March 16, 2013, by unanimous decision (50–45, 50–45, and 50–45). In preparation for the bout, GSP retained well-known boxer Lucian Bute as a sparring partner.

St-Pierre faced Johny Hendricks on November 16, 2013, in the main event at UFC 167. St-Pierre won the fight by controversial split decision (47–48, 48–47, and 48–47) where the 16/16 media scored the fight for Johnny Hendricks. In his post-fight interview, St-Pierre said he would step away from fighting 'for a little bit'. This fight earned him a $50,000 Fight of the Night award.

==== Vacating the title and MMA hiatus ====
St-Pierre officially announced on December 13, 2013, that he voluntarily vacated the title and needed to take some time off from MMA. He left the door open for a possible return to MMA in the future. In a 2021 interview he said he needed the break because of the high levels of performance-enhancing substances in the UFC, as well as requiring time to work through personal issues.

Via Twitter, St-Pierre announced on March 27, 2014, that he had torn his left ACL while training, further delaying a potential return to fighting. The torn left ACL would require surgery. He was medically cleared to resume training on October 17, 2014, but it remained unclear if he had plans to fight professionally again. In 2015, St-Pierre played a key role in Rory MacDonald's preparation for his rematch with Robbie Lawler at UFC 189.

==== Return, Middleweight Champion, and retirement ====
St-Pierre announced on June 20, 2016, that he was re-negotiating his contract with the UFC with hopes of returning to the Octagon for December's UFC 206 in Toronto.

After months of negotiations, on February 15, 2017, St-Pierre and UFC reportedly agreed to financial terms of a multi-fight contract. The next day, UFC president Dana White confirmed St-Pierre had officially re-signed with the organization. In March 2017, St-Pierre revealed the contract was for four fights.

While on SportsCenter, Dana White confirmed that St-Pierre would make his return against UFC Middleweight Champion Michael Bisping sometime in 2017. On May 11, 2017, Dana White announced the fight had been cancelled. The UFC and Bisping had wanted to have the fight at early July's UFC 213 but St-Pierre announced on his Instagram page that he had an eye injury and difficulty moving up a weight class would prevent him from fighting until November. During the post-fight conference at late July's UFC 214, Dana White stated the fight was back on. White had intended for St-Pierre to fight current UFC Welterweight Champion Tyron Woodley. However White was critical of Woodley's performance in his last two fights and with Robert Whittaker, Bisping's next intended opponent, medically suspended until January 2018, White decided to return to the original plan.

The pairing with Bisping took place in the main event of UFC 217 on November 4, 2017, nearly four years since UFC 167, when GSP last fought. St-Pierre defeated Bisping via technical submission in the third round to become the Middleweight Champion and the fourth person in UFC history to become a champion in multiple divisions. This win earned St-Pierre his first Performance of the Night bonus award. St-Pierre's return to the octagon set the record for the Canadian pay-per-view market, surpassing the Floyd Mayweather vs. Conor McGregor boxing match from August 2017. St-Pierre's win earned him the praise of Canadian Prime Minister Justin Trudeau.

On December 7, 2017, St-Pierre announced that he was vacating his UFC middleweight title after 34 days of holding the belt. Suffering from ulcerative colitis, St-Pierre wanted to avoid holding up the middleweight division.

After his win at UFC 223, UFC Lightweight Champion Khabib Nurmagomedov called out St-Pierre as his first title defence later in the year. St-Pierre declined, stating again that he was not medically fit to compete. In June, it was leaked that the UFC was attempting to book St-Pierre against Nate Diaz as the co-main event at UFC 227. St-Pierre confirmed he had been approached but declined by saying a match-up against Diaz did not interest him. In August, St-Pierre announced he was looking to return at the end of the year and was interested in dropping down to lightweight and fighting the winner of Khabib Nurmagomedov and Conor McGregor. Dana White said St-Pierre would not be fighting the winner of Nurmagomedov vs McGregor and White would request St-Pierre remain at welterweight.

On December 13, 2018, St-Pierre revealed on La Sueur podcast that he had recovered completely from ulcerative colitis, but had not yet decided whether or not he would return to fighting.

St-Pierre announced his official retirement on February 21, 2019, at a press conference at the Bell Centre in Montreal.

On May 9, 2020, UFC announced St-Pierre will be inducted into the Modern-Era Wing of the UFC Hall of Fame. He was voted as the greatest pound-for-pound MMA fighter in history in The Athletic MMA fighter survey.

On 9 June 2021, Saint-Isidore honoured St-Pierre with the unveiling of a life-sized 136 kg bronze statue of himself, complete with a biography entitled “Place GSP”. The statue sits in an octagon representing the UFC cage with St-Pierre's eight core values engraved in French on the octagon floor: family, perseverance, wisdom, integrity, generosity, respect, creativity and honour.

On October 19, 2023, St-Pierre was awarded the Order of Sport and inducted into Canada's Sports Hall of Fame.

== Submission grappling career ==
=== ADCC Submission Wrestling World Championship ===
A month after UFC 52, St-Pierre decided to participate in the biggest grappling tournament in the world in the under 77 kg division. In his first fight participation in the ADCC Submission Wrestling World Championship he faced Otto Olson (Trials champion and ADCC 2003 silver medalist beating names like Daniel Moraes, in the Trials final and in the first fight of the ADCC tournament, Fernando Augusto and Cris Brown). St-Pierre won on points showing superiority in wrestling. In his second fight, St-Pierre faced Leonardo Silva Dos Santos: bronze (2000) and silver (2001) medalist of the World IBJJF Jiu-Jitsu Championship and was defeated in a flying armbar at 50 seconds into the fight.

=== UFC Fight Pass Invitational ===
During International Fight Week 2023, the UFC announced that St-Pierre was going to make his return to professional grappling at UFC Fight Pass Invitational 6 on December 14, 2023. It was later announced that his opponent would be fellow UFC veteran Nick Diaz, but the match was postponed due to injury. Later in 2024, St-Pierre confirmed that he was no longer planning to return to professional grappling.

== Personal life ==
St-Pierre has founded a charity, the GSP Foundation, that aims to reduce bullying and encourage youth participation in sports.

St-Pierre has spoken about mental illness in interviews. He has stated that at the time of his first retirement he "was in some kind of depression" and said in 2014 that he has obsessive–compulsive disorder. He credited his OCD in being a factor in his success.

=== Tattoos ===
St-Pierre has a tattoo on the left side of his chest showing the kanji of Jujutsu (柔術). He also has a tattoo on his right calf depicting a Fleur-de-lis.

== Championships and accomplishments ==
=== Mixed martial arts ===
- Ultimate Fighting Championship
  - UFC Hall of Fame (Modern Wing, Class of 2020)
  - UFC Middleweight Championship (one time)
    - Fourth Multi-Divisional Champion in UFC History
  - UFC Welterweight Championship (two times)
    - Nine successful title defenses
    - Third most consecutive title defenses in the UFC history (9)
    - Most successful title defenses in UFC Welterweight division history (9)
    - Most consecutive title defenses in UFC Welterweight division history (9)
  - Interim UFC Welterweight Championship (one time, first)
    - Most wins in UFC welterweight title fights (12)
    - Most UFC Welterweight title fights (14)
    - Second most wins in UFC title fights (13) (behind Jon Jones)
    - Tied (Valentina Shevchenko) for fourth most combined title defenses in UFC history (9)
  - Fight of the Night (Four times) vs. Jon Fitch, Josh Koscheck, Carlos Condit, Johny Hendricks
  - Knockout of the Night (one time) vs. Matt Hughes 2
  - Submission of the Night (one time) vs. Matt Hughes 3
  - Performance of the Night (one time) vs. Michael Bisping
  - UFC Encyclopedia Awards
    - Fight of the Night (Two times) vs. Karo Parisyan and B.J. Penn 1
    - Knockout of the Night (one time) vs. Jay Hieron
  - Tied (Jon Jones, Khabib Nurmagomedov, Demetrious Johnson & Max Holloway) for the fifth longest win streak in UFC history (13)
    - Second longest win streak in UFC Welterweight division history (12)
  - Second most wins in UFC Welterweight division history (19)
  - Tied for third most decision wins in UFC history (12)
    - Tied for sixth most unanimous decision wins in UFC history (10)
    - Tied (Neil Magny) for third most unanimous decision wins in UFC Welterweight division history (10)
    - Tied (Belal Muhammad) for second most decision wins in UFC Welterweight division history (12)
  - Second most takedowns landed in UFC history (90) (behind Merab Dvalishvili)
    - Most takedowns landed in UFC Welterweight division history (87)
  - Second most total strikes landed in UFC Welterweight division history (2523) (behind Neil Magny)
  - Most control time in UFC history (2:42:04)
    - Most control time in UFC Welterweight division history (2:38:49)
  - Most top position time in UFC history (2:22:05)
    - Most top position time in UFC Welterweight division history (2:18:53)
  - Second highest significant strike defense percentage in UFC history (73.1%)
    - Highest significant strike defense percentage in UFC Welterweight division history (73.0%)
  - Fourth highest takedown accuracy percentage in UFC history (73.8%)
  - Tied (Jake Ellenberger) for eighth most bouts in UFC Welterweight division history (21)
  - Highest takedown accuracy percentage in UFC Welterweight division history (73.7%)"
  - Fifth most total fight time in UFC Welterweight division history (5:28:12)
  - Third most submission attempts in UFC Welterweight division history (23)
  - Holds wins over seven former UFC champions (6 undisputed) — vs. Matt Hughes (x2), B.J. Penn (x2), Matt Serra, Sean Sherk, Johny Hendricks, Michael Bisping and Carlos Condit (interim)
  - UFC.com Awards
    - 2005: Ranked #2 Submission of the Year & Ranked #10 Fight of the Year vs. Frank Trigg
    - 2006: Ranked #4 Knockout of the Year vs. Matt Hughes 2 & Ranked #2 Fight of the Year vs. B.J. Penn 1
    - 2007: Ranked #5 Fighter of the Year & Ranked #5 Submission of the Year vs. Matt Hughes
    - 2008: Ranked #6 Fighter of the Year & Ranked #6 Fight of the Year vs. Jon Fitch
    - 2009: Fighter of the Year
    - 2010: Ranked #5 Fighter of the Year
    - 2012: Ranked #5 Fight of the Year vs. Carlos Condit
    - 2013: Ranked #9 Fighter of the Year & Ranked #10 Fight of the Year vs. Johny Hendricks
    - 2017: Ranked #9 Submission of the Year, Ranked #9 Fight of the Year & Ranked #10 Upset of the Year vs. Michael Bisping
- Universal Combat Challenge / TKO Major League MMA
  - UCC/TKO Canadian Welterweight Championship (one time)
    - Two title defenses
- ESPN
  - Top 100 Athletes of the 21st Century - #76
  - #2 Ranked Men's MMA Fighter of the 21st Century
- Canada's Sports Hall of Fame
  - Class of 2023
  - Order of Sport
- FanSided
  - 2000s #2 Ranked MMA Fighter of the Decade
- BJPenn.com
  - 2010s #7 Ranked Fighter of the Decade
- The Athletic
  - 2010s Welterweight Fighter of the Decade
- Bloody Elbow
  - 2010s Welterweight Fighter of the Decade
- Black Belt Magazine
  - Fighter of the Year (2008)
- Sherdog
  - Mixed Martial Arts Hall of Fame
  - 2017 Comeback Fighter of the Year vs. Michael Bisping
- Inside MMA
  - 2009 Fighter of the Year Bazzie Award
- MMA Junkie
  - 2008 Fight of the Year vs. Jon Fitch at UFC 87
  - 2009 Fighter of the Year
  - 2017 Comeback Fighter of the Year
  - 2017 #5 Ranked Submission of the Year vs. Michael Bisping at UFC 217
  - 2010s #4 Ranked Fighter of the Decade
- Fight Matrix
  - Male Fighter of the Year (2009)
  - Male Fighter of the Year (2010)
  - 2012 Comeback Fighter of the Year vs. Carlos Condit on November 17, 2012
  - 2017 Comeback Fighter of the Year vs. Michael Bisping on November 4, 2017
  - 2006 Most Noteworthy Match of Year vs. Matt Hughes on November 16, 2006
  - 2007 Most Noteworthy Match of Year vs. Matt Serra on April 7, 2007
  - 2009 Most Noteworthy Match of Year vs. B.J. Penn on January 31, 2009
  - Greatest Welterweight of All Time
  - Greatest Fighter of All Time
- Rogers Sportsnet
  - 2008 Rogers Sportsnet Canadian Athlete of the Year
  - 2009 Rogers Sportsnet Canadian Athlete of the Year
  - 2010 Rogers Sportsnet Canadian Athlete of the Year
- Spike Guys' Choice Awards
  - 2010 Most Dangerous Man of the Year
- Sports Illustrated
  - 2009 Fighter of the Year
- Wrestling Observer Newsletter Awards
  - 2013 Best Box Office Draw
  - 2008 Most Outstanding Fighter
  - 2009 Most Outstanding Fighter
  - 2010 Most Outstanding Fighter
  - 2011 MMA Most Valuable Fighter
  - 2013 MMA Most Valuable Fighter
  - 2017 MMA Most Valuable Fighter
- World MMA Awards
  - 2008 Submission of the Year vs. Matt Hughes at UFC 79
  - 2009 Fighter of the Year
- ESPY Awards
  - 2008 Nomination – Best Fighter ESPY Award
  - 2010 Nomination – Best Fighter ESPY Award
  - 2011 Nomination – Best Fighter ESPY Award
  - 2018 Nomination – Best Fighter ESPY Award
- Inside Fights
  - 2009 Fighter of the Year
- MMA Fighting
  - 2005 Welterweight Fighter of the Year
  - 2006 Welterweight Fighter of the Year
  - 2009 #3 Ranked Fighter of the Year
  - 2010s #6 Ranked Fighter of the Decade
  - Greatest UFC Fighter of All Time
- MMA Sucka
  - 2017 Comeback Fighter of the Year
- Cagewriters
  - 2010 Fighter of the Year tied with Cain Velasquez
- Canadian Pro-Wrestling Hall of Fame
  - Class of 2021 (MMA Wing)

== Mixed martial arts record ==
Professional record breakdown
28 matches	26 wins	2 losses
By knockout	8	1
By submission	6	1
By decision	12	0

Res.	Record	Opponent	Method	Event	Date	Round	Time	Location	Notes
Win	26–2	Michael Bisping	Technical submission (rear-naked choke)	UFC 217	November 4, 2017	3	4:23	New York City, New York, United States	Middleweight debut. Won the UFC Middleweight Championship. Performance of the Night. Later vacated title.
Win	25–2	Johny Hendricks	Decision (split)	UFC 167	November 16, 2013	5	5:00	Las Vegas, Nevada, United States	Defended the UFC Welterweight Championship. Extended the record for consecutive UFC Welterweight title defenses (9). Fight of the Night. Later vacated title.
Win	24–2	Nick Diaz	Decision (unanimous)	UFC 158	March 16, 2013	5	5:00	Montreal, Quebec, Canada	Defended the UFC Welterweight Championship.
Win	23–2	Carlos Condit	Decision (unanimous)	UFC 154	November 17, 2012	5	5:00	Montreal, Quebec, Canada	Defended and unified the UFC Welterweight Championship. Fight of the Night.
Win	22–2	Jake Shields	Decision (unanimous)	UFC 129	April 30, 2011	5	5:00	Toronto, Ontario, Canada	Defended the UFC Welterweight Championship. Broke the record for the most consecutive UFC Welterweight title defenses (6).
Win	21–2	Josh Koscheck	Decision (unanimous)	UFC 124	December 11, 2010	5	5:00	Montreal, Quebec, Canada	Defended the UFC Welterweight Championship. Fight of the Night.
Win	20–2	Dan Hardy	Decision (unanimous)	UFC 111	March 27, 2010	5	5:00	Newark, New Jersey, United States	Defended the UFC Welterweight Championship.
Win	19–2	Thiago Alves	Decision (unanimous)	UFC 100	July 11, 2009	5	5:00	Las Vegas, Nevada, United States	Defended the UFC Welterweight Championship.
Win	18–2	B.J. Penn	TKO (corner stoppage)	UFC 94	January 31, 2009	4	5:00	Las Vegas, Nevada, United States	Defended the UFC Welterweight Championship.
Win	17–2	Jon Fitch	Decision (unanimous)	UFC 87	August 9, 2008	5	5:00	Minneapolis, Minnesota, United States	Defended the UFC Welterweight Championship. Fight of the Night.
Win	16–2	Matt Serra	TKO (knees to the body)	UFC 83	April 19, 2008	2	4:45	Montreal, Quebec, Canada	Won and unified the UFC Welterweight Championship.
Win	15–2	Matt Hughes	Submission (armbar)	UFC 79	December 29, 2007	2	4:54	Las Vegas, Nevada, United States	Won the interim UFC Welterweight Championship. Submission of the Night.
Win	14–2	Josh Koscheck	Decision (unanimous)	UFC 74	August 25, 2007	3	5:00	Las Vegas, Nevada, United States	
Loss	13–2	Matt Serra	TKO (punches)	UFC 69	April 7, 2007	1	3:25	Houston, Texas, United States	Lost the UFC Welterweight Championship.
Win	13–1	Matt Hughes	TKO (head kick and punches)	UFC 65	November 18, 2006	2	1:25	Sacramento, California, United States	Won the UFC Welterweight Championship. Knockout of the Night.
Win	12–1	B.J. Penn	Decision (split)	UFC 58	March 4, 2006	3	5:00	Las Vegas, Nevada, United States	
Win	11–1	Sean Sherk	TKO (punches and elbows)	UFC 56	November 19, 2005	2	2:53	Las Vegas, Nevada, United States	
Win	10–1	Frank Trigg	Submission (rear-naked choke)	UFC 54	August 20, 2005	1	4:09	Las Vegas, Nevada, United States	
Win	9–1	Jason Miller	Decision (unanimous)	UFC 52	April 16, 2005	3	5:00	Las Vegas, Nevada, United States	
Win	8–1	Dave Strasser	Submission (kimura)	TKO 19: Rage	January 29, 2005	1	1:52	Montreal, Quebec, Canada	Defended the TKO Canadian Welterweight Championship. The championship was later unified with the TKO World Welterweight Championship after St-Pierre signed with the UFC.
Loss	7–1	Matt Hughes	Submission (armbar)	UFC 50	October 22, 2004	1	4:59	Atlantic City, New Jersey, United States	For the vacant UFC Welterweight Championship.
Win	7–0	Jay Hieron	TKO (punches)	UFC 48	June 19, 2004	1	1:42	Las Vegas, Nevada, United States	
Win	6–0	Karo Parisyan	Decision (unanimous)	UFC 46	January 31, 2004	3	5:00	Las Vegas, Nevada, United States	
Win	5–0	Pete Spratt	Submission (rear-naked choke)	TKO 14: Road Warriors	November 29, 2003	1	3:40	Victoriaville, Quebec, Canada	
Win	4–0	Thomas Denny	TKO (cut)	UCC 12: Adrenaline	January 25, 2003	2	4:45	Montreal, Quebec, Canada	
Win	3–0	Travis Galbraith	TKO (elbows)	UCC 11: The Next Level	October 11, 2002	1	2:03	Montreal, Quebec, Canada	Defended the UCC Canadian Welterweight Championship.
Win	2–0	Justin Bruckmann	Submission (armbar)	UCC 10: Battles	June 15, 2002	1	3:53	Gatineau, Quebec, Canada	Won the UCC Canadian Welterweight Championship.
Win	1–0	Ivan Menjivar	TKO (punches)	UCC 7: Bad Boyz	January 25, 2002	1	4:59	Montreal, Quebec, Canada	Welterweight debut.

== Submission grappling record ==
2 matches, 1 win, 1 loss
Result	Rec.	Opponent	Method	Event	Division	Date	Location
Lose	1–1	(Brazil) Leonardo Silva Dos Santos	Submission (flying armbar)	ADCC 2005	–77 kg	2005	Long Beach, California
Win	1–0	(United States) Otto Olson	Points	ADCC 2005	–77 kg	2005	Long Beach, California

== Pay-per-view bouts ==
No	Event	Fight	Date	Venue	City	PPV buys
1.	UFC 65	Hughes vs. St-Pierre 2	18 November 2006	ARCO Arena	Sacramento, California, U.S.	500,000
2.	UFC 69	St-Pierre vs. Serra	7 April 2007	Toyota Center	Houston, Texas, U.S.	400,000
3.	UFC 79	St-Pierre vs. Hughes 3	29 December 2007	Mandalay Bay Events Center	Las Vegas, Nevada, U.S.	650,000
4.	UFC 83	Serra vs. St-Pierre 2	19 April 2008	Bell Centre	Montreal, Quebec, Canada	530,000
5.	UFC 87	St-Pierre vs. Fitch	9 August 2008	Target Center	Minneapolis, Minnesota, U.S.	625,000
6.	UFC 94	St-Pierre vs. Penn 2	31 January 2009	MGM Grand Garden Arena	Las Vegas, Nevada, U.S.	920,000
7.	UFC 111	St-Pierre vs. Hardy	27 March 2010	Prudential Center	Newark, New Jersey, U.S.	770,000
8.	UFC 124	St-Pierre vs. Koscheck 2	11 December 2010	Bell Centre	Montreal, Quebec, Canada	800,000
9.	UFC 129	St-Pierre vs. Shields	30 April 2011	Rogers Center	Toronto, Ontario, Canada	800,000
10.	UFC 154	St-Pierre vs. Condit	17 November 2012	Bell Centre	Montreal, Quebec, Canada	700,000
11.	UFC 158	St-Pierre vs. Diaz	16 March 2013	Bell Centre	Montreal, Quebec, Canada	950,000
12.	UFC 167	St-Pierre vs. Hendricks	16 November 2013	MGM Grand Garden Arena	Las Vegas, Nevada, U.S.	630,000
13.	UFC 217	Bisping vs. St-Pierre	4 November 2017	Madison Square Garden	New York City, New York, U.S.	875,000
Total sales						9,150,000

== Filmography ==
=== Film ===
Year	Title	Role	Notes
2009	Death Warrior	Shaman	
2009	Never Surrender	Georges	
2010	The Striking Truth	Georges	
2014	Captain America: The Winter Soldier	Georges Batroc	
2016	Kickboxer: Vengeance	Kavi	
2017	Cartels	Bruno Sinclair	
2023	Hitmen	The Reaper	
2023	King of Killers	Andre LeCroix	

=== Television ===
Year	Title	Role	Notes
2021	The Falcon and the Winter Soldier	Georges Batroc	3 episodes
2021	What If...?	Georges Batroc	Voice role; Episode: "What If... the Watcher Broke His Oath?"
2024	The Cage	himself	3 episodes

== See also ==
- List of UFC champions
- Double champions in MMA
- List of male mixed martial artists
- List of Canadian UFC fighters
- UFC Hall of Fame

Achievements
Preceded by Matt Hughes	6th UFC Welterweight Champion; November 18, 2006 – April 7, 2007	Succeeded by Matt Serra
New championship	1st UFC Interim Welterweight Champion; December 29, 2007 – April 19, 2008	Vacant Title next held by Carlos Condit
Preceded by Matt Serra	8th UFC Welterweight Champion; April 19, 2008 – December 13, 2013; Vacated	Vacant Title next held by Johny Hendricks
Preceded by Michael Bisping	9th UFC Middleweight Champion; November 4, 2017 – December 7, 2017; Vacated	Succeeded by Robert Whittaker; Promoted
Awards
New award	World MMA Submission of the Year; 2008 vs. Matt Hughes at UFC 79	Succeeded by Jorge Masvidal
Preceded by Anderson Silva	World MMA Fighter of the Year; 2009	Succeeded by José Aldo
UFC records
Preceded by Matt Hughes	Most top position time 2:22:05	Incumbent
Preceded by Randy Couture	Most control time April 30, 2011 – present 2:42:04	Incumbent
