= UFC Hall of Fame =

Honors mixed martial artists and MMA personalities

- Established: November 21, 2003
- Founder: Ultimate Fighting Championship
- Inductees: Pioneer wing (22); Modern wing (16); Contributors wing (8); Fight wing (10); Forrest Griffin Community Award (6) (62 total inductees)
- Website: UFC Hall of Fame

The UFC Hall of Fame is a hall of fame which honors mixed martial artists and MMA personalities, established and maintained by the American-based mixed martial arts promotion Ultimate Fighting Championship (UFC). In addition to the Ultimate Fighting Championship, the UFC Hall of Fame recognizes accomplishments from Pride Fighting Championships, World Extreme Cagefighting and Strikeforce; all of which are former mixed martial arts promotions that have been bought out by the UFC and its parent corporations.

== History ==
It was officially established on November 21, 2003 at UFC 45 with its home being Las Vegas, and the first inductees being inaugural UFC competitors Royce Gracie and Ken Shamrock.

In 2015, the UFC announced a significant reboot of its Hall of Fame. The Hall was split into four categories, or wings, and a new class of legends would henceforth be inducted every July at a gala event during the UFC's annual International Fight Week in Las Vegas.

The wings are:

- Pioneer Wing – commemorating the original innovators of MMA, who competed in professional bouts before the adoption of the Unified Rules of Mixed Martial Arts, which went into effect at UFC 28, November 28, 2000.
- Modern Wing – celebrating fighters who made their pro-debuts in the age of the Unified Rules.
- Contributors Wing – recognizing outstanding contributions outside of active competition.
- Fight Wing – recognizing the greatest, most memorable, and historically important bouts.
- Forrest Griffin Community Award – recognizing athletes for their volunteer and charity work and the impact their efforts have on the community.

The new Hall of Fame was a passion project of former UFC executive Anthony Evans, who pitched UFC President Dana White on the four-wing structure several times before finally getting White's permission in 2015.

The UFC Hall of Fame is located in the UFC Performance Institute on the walls of the first and second floor staircase.

== Inductees ==
=== Pioneer wing ===
Image	ISO	Name	Date of Induction	Ref.	Event of Induction	UFC recognized accolades
	(Brazil)	Royce Gracie	November 21, 2003		UFC 45	UFC 1 Tournament Winner; UFC 2 Tournament Winner; UFC 4 Tournament Winner; Most tournament wins in UFC history (3)
	(United States)	Ken Shamrock	November 21, 2003		UFC 45	Inaugural UFC Superfight Champion with two defenses
	(United States)	Dan Severn	April 16, 2005		UFC 52	One-time UFC Superfight Champion; UFC 5 Tournament Winner; Ultimate Ultimate 1995 Tournament Winner
	(United States)	Randy Couture	June 24, 2006		The Ultimate Fighter: Team Ortiz vs. Team Shamrock Finale	Three-time UFC Heavyweight Champion with three defenses Two-time UFC Light Heavyweight Champion; One-time Interim UFC Light Heavyweight champion UFC 13 Heavyweight Tournament Winner; Most title reigns in UFC history (6 (5 undisputed, 1 interim)); Oldest champion in UFC history (45 years, 147 days); First champion to hold titles in two different divisions
	(United States)	Mark Coleman	March 1, 2008		UFC 82	Inaugural and one-time UFC Heavyweight Champion; UFC 10 Tournament Winner; UFC 11 Tournament Winner; 2000 Pride Openweight Grand Prix Winner
	(United States)	Chuck Liddell	July 11, 2009		UFC 100	One-time UFC Light Heavyweight Champion with four defenses Most knockouts in UFC Light Heavyweight history (10); Most consecutive knockouts in UFC history (7)
	(United States)	Matt Hughes	May 29, 2010		UFC 114	Two-time UFC Welterweight Champion with seven defenses Most finishes (8), knockouts (5) and submissions (3) in UFC Welterweight title fights
	(United States)	Tito Ortiz	July 7, 2012		UFC 148	One-time UFC Light Heavyweight Champion with five defenses
	(United States)	Pat Miletich	July 5, 2014		UFC 175	Inaugural and one-time UFC Welterweight Champion with four defenses UFC 16 Welterweight Tournament Winner
	(Netherlands)	Bas Rutten	July 11, 2015		UFC 189	One-time UFC Heavyweight Champion.
	(Brazil)	Antônio Rodrigo Nogueira	July 10, 2016		UFC Fan Expo	One-time Pride Heavyweight Champion; One-time Interim Pride Heavyweight Champion; One-time Interim UFC Heavyweight Champion
	(United States)	Don Frye	July 10, 2016		UFC Fan Expo	UFC 8 Tournament Winner; Ultimate Ultimate 1996 Tournament Winner
	(United States)	Maurice Smith	July 6, 2017		UFC Fan Expo	One-time UFC Heavyweight Champion with one defense
	(Japan)	Kazushi Sakuraba	July 6, 2017		UFC Hall of Fame Ceremony, 2017	UFC Japan Heavyweight Tournament Winner
	(United States)	Matt Serra	July 5, 2018		UFC Hall of Fame Ceremony, 2018	One-time UFC Welterweight Champion; The Ultimate Fighter 4 Welterweight Tournament Winner
	(United States)	Rich Franklin	July 5, 2019		UFC Hall of Fame Ceremony, 2019	One-time UFC Middleweight Champion with two defenses
	(United States)	Kevin Randleman	September 23, 2021		UFC Hall of Fame Ceremony, 2020	Posthumous inductee. One-time UFC Heavyweight Champion with one defense
	(United States)	Jens Pulver	July 6, 2023		UFC Hall of Fame Ceremony, 2023	Inaugural and one-time UFC Lightweight Champion with two defenses
	(Brazil)	Anderson Silva	July 6, 2023		UFC Hall of Fame Ceremony, 2023	One-time UFC Middleweight Champion with ten defenses Tied for most consecutive wins in UFC history (16); Longest single title reign in UFC history (2,457 days); Most finishes in title bouts in UFC history (9); Most Knockout of the Night bonuses in UFC history (7)
	(Brazil)	Wanderlei Silva	June 27, 2024		UFC Hall of Fame Ceremony, 2024	One-time Pride FC Middleweight Champion with four defenses 2003 Pride Middleweight Grand Prix Winner; Longest single title reign in Pride FC history (1,939 days); Most wins in Pride FC history (22); Longest undefeated streak in Pride FC history (20); Most knockouts in Pride FC history (15); Most wins in title bouts in Pride FC history (5); Most consecutive successful title defenses in Pride FC history (4); Most knockouts (19) and knockdowns (27) in Zuffa, LLC (UFC, Pride, WEC, Strikeforce) history
	(Brazil)	Vitor Belfort	June 26, 2025		UFC Hall of Fame Ceremony, 2025	One-time UFC Light Heavyweight Champion; UFC 12 Heavyweight Tournament winner Most first round finishes in UFC history (13); Third most knockouts in UFC history (12)
	(United States)	Mark Kerr	June 26, 2025		UFC Hall of Fame Ceremony, 2025	UFC 14 Heavyweight Tournament Winner; UFC 15 Heavyweight Tournament Winner; NCAA Division I Champion - 1992 at 190 lb

=== Modern wing ===
Image	ISO	Name	Date of Induction	Ref.	Event of Induction	UFC recognized accolades
	(United States)	Forrest Griffin	July 6, 2013		UFC 162	One-time UFC Light Heavyweight Champion; The Ultimate Fighter 1 Light Heavyweight Tournament Winner
	(United States)	B.J. Penn	July 11, 2015		UFC 189	One-time UFC Welterweight Champion; One-time UFC Lightweight Champion with three defenses UFC 41 Lightweight Tournament Co-Champion
	(United States)	Urijah Faber	July 6, 2017		UFC Hall of Fame Ceremony, 2017	One-time WEC Featherweight Champion with five defenses Four-time UFC Bantamweight Championship challenger.
	(United States)	Ronda Rousey	July 5, 2018		UFC Hall of Fame Ceremony, 2018	Inaugural and one-time UFC Women's Bantamweight Champion with six defenses One-time Strikeforce Women's Bantamweight Champion with one defense
	(United States)	Rashad Evans	July 5, 2019		UFC Hall of Fame Ceremony, 2019	One-time UFC Light Heavyweight Champion; The Ultimate Fighter 2 Heavyweight Tournament Winner
	(England)	Michael Bisping	July 5, 2019		UFC Hall of Fame Ceremony, 2019	One-time UFC Middleweight Champion with one defense The Ultimate Fighter 3 Light Heavyweight Tournament Winner; Most wins in UFC Middleweight history (16)
	(Canada)	Georges St-Pierre	September 23, 2021		UFC Hall of Fame Ceremony, 2020	One-time UFC Middleweight Champion; Two-time UFC Welterweight Champion with nine defenses One-time Interim UFC Welterweight Champion; Most control time and top-position time in UFC history
	(United States)	Daniel Cormier	June 30, 2022		UFC Hall of Fame Ceremony, 2022	One-time UFC Heavyweight Champion with one defense One-time UFC Light Heavyweight Champion with three defenses Strikeforce Heavyweight Grand Prix Winner
	(Russia)	Khabib Nurmagomedov	June 30, 2022		UFC Hall of Fame Ceremony, 2022	One-time UFC Lightweight Champion with three defenses Headlined the highest-selling UFC pay-per-view event at UFC 229 with 2.4 million PPV buys
	(United States)	Donald Cerrone	July 6, 2023		UFC Hall of Fame Ceremony, 2023	One-time UFC Lightweight Championship challenger Two-time WEC Lightweight Championship challenger One-time Interim WEC Lightweight Championship challenger Most knockdowns in UFC history (20); Most bouts (48) and wins (29) in Zuffa, LLC (UFC, Pride, WEC, Strikeforce) history. Most Post-Fight bonuses in UFC/WEC combined history (23)
	(Brazil)	José Aldo	July 6, 2023		UFC Hall of Fame Ceremony, 2023	Inaugural and two-time UFC Featherweight Champion with seven defenses One-time Interim UFC Featherweight Champion; One-time WEC Featherweight Champion with two defenses One-time UFC Bantamweight Championship challenger
	(Brazil)	Maurício Rua	June 27, 2024		UFC Hall of Fame Ceremony, 2024	One-time UFC Light Heavyweight Champion; 2005 Pride Middleweight Grand Prix Winner
	(Poland)	Joanna Jędrzejczyk	June 27, 2024		UFC Hall of Fame Ceremony, 2024	One-time UFC Women's Strawweight Champion with five defenses One-time UFC Women's Flyweight Championship challenger
	(United States)	Frankie Edgar	June 27, 2024		UFC Hall of Fame Ceremony, 2024	One-time UFC Lightweight Champion with three defenses Three-time UFC Featherweight Championship challenger
	(United States)	Robbie Lawler	June 26, 2025		UFC Hall of Fame Ceremony, 2025	One-time UFC Welterweight Champion with two defenses 2015 Fight of the Year vs. Rory MacDonald 2 at UFC 189; 2014 Fight of the Year vs. Johny Hendricks at UFC 171
	(Brazil)	Amanda Nunes	June 26, 2025		UFC Hall of Fame Ceremony, 2025	Two-time UFC Women's Bantamweight Champion with six defenses One-time UFC Women's Featherweight Champion with two defenses First and only UFC fighter to defend titles in two divisions while holding both titles simultaneously Longest combined UFC title reign of all time (3,940 days); Most title fight wins in UFC women's history (11); Most consecutive wins (12), knockouts (7), and tied for most finishes (10) in UFC Women's history Most wins (13), knockouts (6), finishes (8), knockdowns (6), takedowns (32) and consecutive wins (9) in UFC Women's Bantamweight history
	(United States)	Dominick Cruz	July 9, 2026		UFC Hall of Fame Ceremony, 2026	Inaugural and two-time UFC Bantamweight Champion with three defenses One-time WEC Bantamweight Champion with two defenses
	(United States)	Demetrious Johnson	July 9, 2026		UFC Hall of Fame Ceremony, 2026	Inaugural and one-time UFC Flyweight Champion with eleven defenses Most consecutive title defenses in UFC history (11); Longest title reign in UFC Flyweight division history (2142 days); Most UFC flyweight title fight wins (12); Latest submission in UFC title history (4:59 in R5 vs. Kyoji Horiguchi); Most consecutive wins in UFC Flyweight division history (13)
	(United States)	Chris Weidman	July 9, 2026		UFC Hall of Fame Ceremony, 2026	One-time UFC Middleweight Champion with three defenses Defeated Anderson Silva to end his historic 16‑fight UFC win streak.

=== Contributors wing ===
Image	ISO	Name	Date of Induction	Ref.	Event of Induction	Contributions
	(United States)	Charles Lewis Jr. (Mask)	July 11, 2009		UFC 100	Founded the first major mixed martial arts clothing line Tapout.
	(United States)	Jeff Blatnick	July 11, 2015		UFC 189	Commentator, UFC commissioner and was instrumental in helping the UFC get regulated by athletic commissions.
	(United States)	Bob Meyrowitz	July 10, 2016		UFC Fan Expo	UFC co-creator and owner from UFC 6 until it was sold to Zuffa in January 2001.
	(United States)	Joe Silva	July 6, 2017		UFC Hall of Fame Ceremony, 2017	UFC matchmaker from 1997 to 2016.
	(United States)	Bruce Connal	July 5, 2018		UFC Hall of Fame Ceremony, 2018	UFC television producer from 1997 to 2018.
	(United States)	Art Davie	July 5, 2018		UFC Hall of Fame Ceremony, 2018	UFC co-creator, co-owner from UFC 1 to UFC 5 and first UFC matchmaker.
	(United States)	Marc Ratner	September 23, 2021		UFC Hall of Fame Ceremony, 2020	Former Executive Director of the Nevada State Athletic Commission, current Vice President of Regulatory Affairs of UFC and credited for legalizing MMA in all 50 states and abroad.
	(United States)	Craig Piligian	June 26, 2025		UFC Hall of Fame Ceremony, 2025	Reality television producer. Creator of The Ultimate Fighter in 2005.
	(United States)	Thomas Gerbasi	July 9, 2026		UFC Hall of Fame Ceremony, 2026	Longtime UFC.com editorial director for over twenty years, respected MMA/boxing journalist, and key historian of the sport.

=== Fight wing ===
Fight	Date of Induction	Ref.	Event of Induction	Notes
Forrest Griffin vs. Stephan Bonnar I	July 6, 2013		UFC 162	Regarded as one of the greatest fights in UFC history. Marked a turning point for the UFC in terms of its journey to mainstream acceptance of MMA as a popular, legitimate sport. Forrest Griffin def. Stephan Bonnar by unanimous decision at The Ultimate Fighter 1 Finale. Fight of the Year (2005).
Matt Hughes vs. Frank Trigg II	July 11, 2015		UFC 189	For the UFC Welterweight Championship. Matt Hughes def. Frank Trigg by submission in Round 1 at UFC 52. Submission of the Year (2005).
Mark Coleman vs. Pete Williams	July 10, 2016		UFC Fan Expo	Pete Williams def. Mark Coleman by head-kick KO, the second head-kick KO in UFC history after Gordeau vs Tuli (UFC 1) at UFC 17. One of the biggest upsets in early UFC history.
Maurício Rua vs. Dan Henderson I	July 5, 2018		UFC Hall of Fame Ceremony, 2018	Dan Henderson def. Maurício Rua by unanimous decision in a back-and-forth fight at UFC 139. Second five-round non-title fight in UFC history and first to go the distance. Fight of the Night. Fight of the Year (2011).
Diego Sanchez vs. Clay Guida	July 5, 2019		UFC Hall of Fame Ceremony, 2019	Diego Sanchez def. Clay Guida by split decision in a three round, back-and-forth fight in the lightweight division at The Ultimate Fighter: United States vs. United Kingdom Finale. Fight of the Night. Fight of the Year (2009).
Jon Jones vs. Alexander Gustafsson I	September 23, 2021		UFC Hall of Fame Ceremony, 2020	Jon Jones def. Alexander Gustafsson by unanimous decision in closely fought five-round fight for the UFC Light Heavyweight Championship at UFC 165. Fight of the Night. Fight of the Year (2013).
Cub Swanson vs. Doo Ho Choi	June 30, 2022		UFC Hall of Fame Ceremony, 2022	Cub Swanson def. Dooho Choi by unanimous decision in a three round, back-and-forth fight in the featherweight division at UFC 206. Fight of the Night. Fight of the Year (2016).
Robbie Lawler vs. Rory MacDonald II	July 6, 2023		UFC Hall of Fame Ceremony, 2023	Robbie Lawler def. Rory MacDonald by technical knockout in the fifth round, MacDonald had been ahead 39-37 on all three judges scorecards. This fight was for the UFC Welterweight Championship at UFC 189. Fight of the Night. Fight of the Year (2015).
Anderson Silva vs. Chael Sonnen I	June 27, 2024		UFC Hall of Fame Ceremony, 2024	Anderson Silva def. Chael Sonnen in the fifth round by triangle-armbar submission after being controlled on the ground for the majority of the fight. This fight was for the UFC Middleweight Championship at UFC 117. Fight of the Night. Fight of the Year (2010).
Israel Adesanya vs. Kelvin Gastelum	June 26, 2025		UFC Hall of Fame Ceremony, 2025	Israel Adesanya def. Kelvin Gastelum by unanimous decision after landing a record of four knockdowns in a title fight to win the Interim UFC Middleweight Championship at UFC 236. Fight of the Night. Fight of the Year (2019).
Zhang Weili vs. Joanna Jędrzejczyk I	July 9, 2026		UFC Hall of Fame Ceremony, 2026	Regarded as the greatest fight in women's MMA history. Zhang Weili def. Joanna Jędrzejczyk by split decision in a title fight to defend the UFC Women's Strawweight Championship at UFC 248. Fight of the Night. Fight of the Year (2020).

=== Forrest Griffin Community Award ===
Image	ISO	Name	Date of Induction	Ref.	Event of Induction	Community contributions
	(United States)	Dustin Poirier	September 23, 2021		UFC Hall of Fame Ceremony, 2020	Founded The Good Fight Foundation and supported other charity work in his hometown of Lafayette.
	(United States)	Max Holloway	June 30, 2022		UFC Hall of Fame Ceremony, 2022	Supported his local community in Hawaii and raised money for charity work.
	(Georgia (country))	Giga Chikadze	June 30, 2022		UFC Hall of Fame Ceremony, 2022	Founded The Knockout Cancer Foundation and raised funds for families who needed financial support.
Antônio Rodrigo Nogueira (pictured)	(Brazil)	Nogueira Brothers (Antônio Rodrigo Nogueira and Antônio Rogério Nogueira)	July 6, 2023		UFC Hall of Fame Ceremony, 2023	Giving back to their communities in Brazil and have made a positive impact on the lives of thousands of kids throughout the country
	(United States)	Beneil Dariush	June 27, 2024		UFC Hall of Fame Ceremony, 2024	Partnered with the Shlama Foundation to raise funds and awareness. Helped fund two orphanages in Haiti in partnership with Promise Child Ministries.
	(Brazil)	Charles Oliveira	June 26, 2025		UFC Hall of Fame Ceremony, 2025	Founded his institute ICBronxs which provides local youth with free education and jiu-jitsu training.
	(Brazil)	Alex Pereira	July 9, 2026		UFC Hall of Fame Ceremony, 2026	Founded Instituto Poatan, a nonprofit supporting underserved youth in São Paulo, Brazil. Recognized for using his platform to uplift disadvantaged communities.
