= Sam Hoger =

American mixed martial arts fighter

- Born: Samuel Earl Hoger; June 28, 1980 (age 46); Baton Rouge, Louisiana, United States
- Other names: The Alaskan Assassin
- Nationality: American
- Height: 6 ft 3 in (1.91 m)
- Weight: 205 lb (93 kg; 14.6 st)
- Division: Light Heavyweight; Heavyweight
- Team: Miletich Fighting Systems (2002–2009); Hoger Martial Arts (2009–2015); Real Martial Arts (2015–present)
- Rank: Black belt in Brazilian Jiu-Jitsu under Ted Stickel; Black belt in Karate under Tom Okamoto
- Years active: 2001–2002 (amateur), 2003–2010

Mixed martial arts record
- Total: 14
- Wins: 10
- By knockout: 3
- By submission: 6
- By decision: 1
- Losses: 4
- By submission: 1
- By decision: 3

Other information
- University: LSU; St. Ambrose University
- Mixed martial arts record from Sherdog

Samuel Earl Hoger (/ˈhoʊɡər/; born June 28, 1980) is an American retired mixed martial artist, poker player, and an actor, most notable for appearing on the first season of The Ultimate Fighter, a reality television series produced by the Ultimate Fighting Championship and broadcast on Spike TV. Hoger has trained with Miletich Fighting Systems in Bettendorf, Iowa and is belted in the Miletich Fighting Systems.

== Background ==
Hoger was born in Baton Rouge, Louisiana to a Panamanian mother and an American father. Before his first birthday, Sam moved with his family to Germany where his father – a major in the US Military – was stationed. From Germany the family moved to Panama due to the United States invasion of Panama. Hoger has two sisters. Hoger got interested in martial arts as a kid when he saw Karate Kid in the movies, and subsequently his mother placed him in karate lessons in Panama. The family moved to Alaska when Sam was a teenager, where he got interested in Brazilian jiu-jitsu and started training under Ted Stickel around the age of 13.

Sam graduated from Chugiak High School and got a senatorial nomination to United States Military Academy. However, Hoger attended New Mexico Military Institute from where he dropped out. He then received a merit-based scholarship to LSU from where he graduated with two Political Science degrees (Theory and Government) Class of 2002. Afterwards he studied for his MBA at St. Ambrose University in Davenport, Iowa. He was also the founder of the Brazilian jiu-jitsu Club at LSU.

== Mixed martial arts career ==
=== Early career ===
Hoger made his amateur debut on January 27, 2001, when he faced Robert DiMarco at Reality Combat Fighting 9. He won the fight via rear-naked choke submission. He then faced John Accardo at Reality Combat Fighting 14 on March 15, 2002. He won via referee stoppage TKO.

Hoger would turn professional in June 2003, and compiled a professional record of 4–0 before being signed to compete on The Ultimate Fighter.

=== The Ultimate Fighter ===
Hoger made it to the semi-finals on the show without having to fight. His comments at the time suggested a calculated and Machiavellian effort on his part to win the show by fighting as late as possible. In the show, he maintained a distance from others and made it a point to keep everyone confused, including his own teammates. He was eliminated by Forrest Griffin in the semi-finals via TKO after a first round Hoger likely won. In the second round, Forrest came out looking to finish, got Hoger in the clinch, knocked him down with a series of knees and finished him with punches to the head.

On the night of The Ultimate Fighter 1 Finale, he won a Unanimous decision against Bobby Southworth, who was considered to be the best light heavyweight on the show by Chuck Liddell, Randy Couture, and Dana White, due to his pre-show professional record.

=== Ultimate Fighting Championship ===
Hoger faced Stephan Bonnar at UFC Ultimate Fight Night on August 6, 2005. He lost the fight via unanimous decision, giving him the first loss of his career. He then faced Jeff Newton at UFC 56 on November 19, 2005. He won the fight via second round rear-naked choke.

In his third fight in the promotion, Hoger faced then-undefeated Rashad Evans at UFC Ultimate Fight Night 4 on April 6, 2006. He lost the fight via split decision. Hoger faced Lyoto Machida at UFC 67 on February 3, 2007. He lost the fight via unanimous decision, and was released from the promotion shortly after.

=== Post-UFC career ===
In his first fight outside of the UFC, Hoger replaced Mike Ciesnolevicz to face longtime MMA fighter Vernon White at IFL: Moline on April 7, 2007. Hoger lost the fight via rear-naked choke, giving him three losses in a row.

He then faced Jason Dolloff at World Championship Fighting 4 on September 19, 2008. Hoger knocked out Dolloff just under twenty seconds into the first round, snapping his three-fight losing streak in the process. Hoger faced Johnathan Ivey at Urban Rumble Championship on January 24, 2009, for the URC Heavyweight Championship. He won the fight via third round kimura to win the Heavyweight Championship.

Hoger was scheduled to face Alistair Overeem at UG 11: A Decade of Fights on October 17, 2009. However, Hoger was removed from the bout and was replaced by Tony Sylvester.

He faced Patrick Miller at Worldwide Gladiator on April 9, 2010. He won the fight via TKO.

In his latest fight, he faced Jody Poff at Fight Night MMA on June 5, 2010. He won the fight via armbar submission.

== Personal life ==
After spending part of the time in Houston, Texas before Machida and White bouts, Hoger decided to relocate completely to Houston. He opened Miletich Fighting Systems Houston gym in 2007 before founding his own Hoger MMA gym in Houston which opened on April 13, 2009.

In 2015, Hoger moved to Los Angeles, California, and founded Real Martial Arts gym.

In 2025 Sam has opened Real Martial Arts in Houston Texas.

== Awards ==
- In 1996, Sam Hoger was awarded the Alaska State Medal of Heroism for saving a drowning teammate by Gov. Tony Knowles.
- Sam Hoger received his black belt from Ted Stickel of Gracie Barra Alaska on July 1, 2009, being only the second person to receive this distinguishing honor from Ted Stickel.

== Championships and accomplishments ==
- Urban Rumble Championship
  - URC Heavyweight Championship (One time)

== Mixed martial arts record ==
Professional record breakdown
14 matches	10 wins	4 losses
By knockout	3	0
By submission	6	1
By decision	1	3

Res.	Record	Opponent	Method	Event	Date	Round	Time	Location	Notes
Win	10–4	Jody Poff	Submission (armbar)	FNMMA – Fight Night MMA	June 5, 2010	1	0:50	Fort Wayne, Indiana, United States	
Win	9–4	Patrick Miller	TKO (punches)	WG – Worldwide Gladiator	April 9, 2010	1	0:27	Pasadena, Texas, United States	
Win	8–4	Johnathan Ivey	Submission (kimura)	URC – Urban Rumble Championship	January 24, 2009	3	0:35	Pasadena, Texas, United States	Won the URC Heavyweight Championship.
Win	7–4	Jason Dolloff	TKO (punches)	World Championship Fighting – World Championship Fighting 4	September 19, 2008	1	0:17	Wilmington, Massachusetts, United States	
Loss	6–4	Vernon White	Submission (rear-naked choke)	International Fight League – Moline	April 7, 2007	2	3:25	Moline, Illinois, United States	
Loss	6–3	Lyoto Machida	Decision (unanimous)	UFC 67	February 3, 2007	3	5:00	Las Vegas, Nevada, United States	
Loss	6–2	Rashad Evans	Decision (split)	UFC Fight Night 4	April 6, 2006	3	5:00	Las Vegas, Nevada, United States	
Win	6–1	Jeff Newton	Submission (rear-naked choke)	UFC 56	November 19, 2005	2	2:05	Las Vegas, Nevada, United States	
Loss	5–1	Stephan Bonnar	Decision (unanimous)	UFC Ultimate Fight Night	August 6, 2005	3	5:00	Las Vegas, Nevada, United States	
Win	5–0	Bobby Southworth	Decision (unanimous)	The Ultimate Fighter 1 Finale	April 9, 2005	3	5:00	Las Vegas, Nevada, United States	
Win	4–0	Chris Herring	Submission (guillotine choke)	MMA – Eruption	April 30, 2004	1	2:37	Lowell, Massachusetts, United States	
Win	3–0	Adam Maciejewski	Submission (triangle choke)	EC 54 – Extreme Challenge 54	October 12, 2003	1	1:29	Lakemoor, Illinois, United States	
Win	2–0	Josh Hendricks	Submission (arm-triangle choke)	NLF – Next Level Fighting	September 13, 2003	1	4:41	Steubenville, Ohio, United States	
Win	1–0	Matt Freeland	KO (kick)	AOW – Art of War	June 21, 2003	1	3:15	Kalispell, Montana, United States	

== Amateur mixed martial arts record ==
Professional record breakdown
2 matches	2 wins	0 losses
By knockout	1	0
By submission	1	0
By decision	0	0

Res.	Record	Opponent	Method	Event	Date	Round	Time	Location	Notes
Win	2–0	John Accardo	TKO (referee stoppage)	RCF 14: Reality Combat Fighting 14	March 15, 2002	1	0:36	United States	
Win	1–0	Robert DiMarco	Submission (rear-naked choke)	RCF 9: Reality Combat Fighting 9	January 27, 2001	1	0:26	Houma, Louisiana, United States	Amateur debut.
