= Keith Jardine =

American actor and mixed martial arts fighter (born 1975)

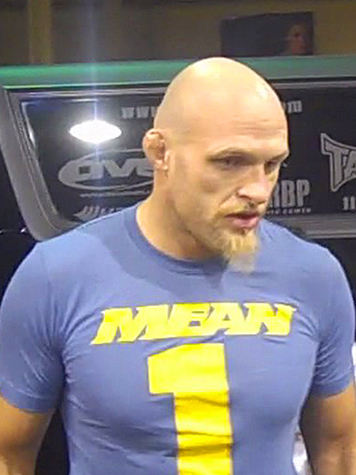
- Jardine at UFC 100 Fan Expo in Las Vegas
- Born: October 31, 1975 (age 51); Butte, Montana, U.S.
- Other names: The Dean of Mean
- Height: 6 ft 2 in (1.88 m)
- Weight: 185 lb (84 kg; 13.2 st)
- Division: Middleweight; Light Heavyweight; Heavyweight
- Reach: 76 in (193 cm)
- Fighting out of: Albuquerque, New Mexico, United States
- Team: Jackson Wink MMA Academy
- Rank: Black belt in Gaidojutsu
- Years active: 2001–2012

Professional boxing record
- Total: 4
- Wins: 3
- By knockout: 1
- Draws: 1

Kickboxing record
- Total: 1
- Wins: 1

Mixed martial arts record
- Total: 30
- Wins: 17
- By knockout: 8
- By submission: 2
- By decision: 7
- Losses: 11
- By knockout: 6
- By decision: 5
- Draws: 2

Other information
- Website: http://www.keithjardine.net
- Boxing record from BoxRec
- Mixed martial arts record from Sherdog

Keith Jardine (born October 31, 1975) is an American actor and retired mixed martial artist who most notably competed in the UFC and Strikeforce.

== Early life ==
Jardine was born in Butte, Montana, moved to Oregon, and finally settled in Los Angeles, California, where he attended Canoga Park High School. Jardine played football and competed in Greco-Roman Wrestling in high school under Coach Rudy Lugo, and continued to compete at Los Angeles Pierce College, then for his final two years of college as a defensive lineman at New Mexico Highlands University, which has a Division II program. He received a degree in Human Performance and Sport from New Mexico Highlands University. Before focusing on a career in mixed martial arts, Jardine worked as a personal trainer, firefighter, football coach, miner, and bounty hunter. He also played rugby and competed in high-level wrestling tournaments after college before traveling to Albuquerque, New Mexico, where he began training for MMA with Greg Jackson.

== Mixed martial arts career ==
Jardine made his professional mixed martial arts debut in 2001, defeating Amir Rahnavardi via armbar submission. He would win five out of his next six bouts, suffering one knockout loss to Thomas Mastin from Des Moines, Iowa six seconds into the fight, before debuting in the Japanese Pancrase organization in 2003. Jardine's bout in Pancrase, with Keiichiro Yamamiya, ended in a draw. Jardine defeated his next two opponents, including a submission win over Red Devil Sport Club fighter Arman Gambaryan, before appearing on The Ultimate Fighter 2.

=== The Ultimate Fighter ===
In 2005, Jardine was cast on The Ultimate Fighter 2, a team-based reality television show created by the UFC, as a Heavyweight competitor. He was the first Heavyweight to be chosen by team coach and then UFC Middleweight Champion Rich Franklin. Although considered a favorite to proceed to the Heavyweight division's finals, Jardine was not selected to fight until the semi-finals, where he was defeated by eventual Heavyweight winner and his future sparring partner, Rashad Evans.

=== Ultimate Fighting Championship ===
Jardine made his first appearance on an official UFC fight card at The Ultimate Fighter 2 Finale, defeating fellow TUF 2 Heavyweight Kerry Schall by TKO due to leg kicks. Jardine was signed to the UFC and subsequently dropped down a weight class to the Light Heavyweight division. His next appearance was at UFC 57 where he defeated Mike Whitehead, another The Ultimate Fighter 2 competitor, by unanimous decision.

In April 2006, Jardine fought The Ultimate Fighter 1 Light Heavyweight finalist Stephan Bonnar at Ultimate Fight Night 4. Jardine lost the fight in part due to a very controversial unanimous decision, but gained a great deal of fan and media support after the bout. After the fight Jardine stated, "Everyone knows that that Bonnar fight should have been my fight[...] I still get approached everyday about that. I am 3–1, but I don't necessarily look at it that way."

Jardine next faced American Top Team's Wilson Gouveia at The Ultimate Fighter 3 Finale. Although color commentator Joe Rogan believed that he lost the first round, Jardine managed to bounce back and defeat Gouveia via unanimous decision after three rounds. Jardine was then scheduled to fight Mike Nickels, a Light Heavyweight competitor from The Ultimate Fighter 3, but Nickels was forced to withdraw due to a back injury. Instead, he next faced The Ultimate Fighter 1 Light Heavyweight winner Forrest Griffin at UFC 66. Although considered an underdog in the bout, Jardine scored a TKO victory in the first round after he floored Forrest then took the full guard and brought many right hands over the top to cause the stoppage. At UFC 71, Jardine was scheduled to fight UFC newcomer Houston Alexander. During his pre-fight interview, Jardine complained about being matched against an unknown newcomer, believing that he deserved an opponent with a higher profile. During the fight, Jardine quickly knocked Alexander down with a punch, but the newcomer promptly returned to his feet and knocked Jardine out just 48 seconds into the first round in a major upset.

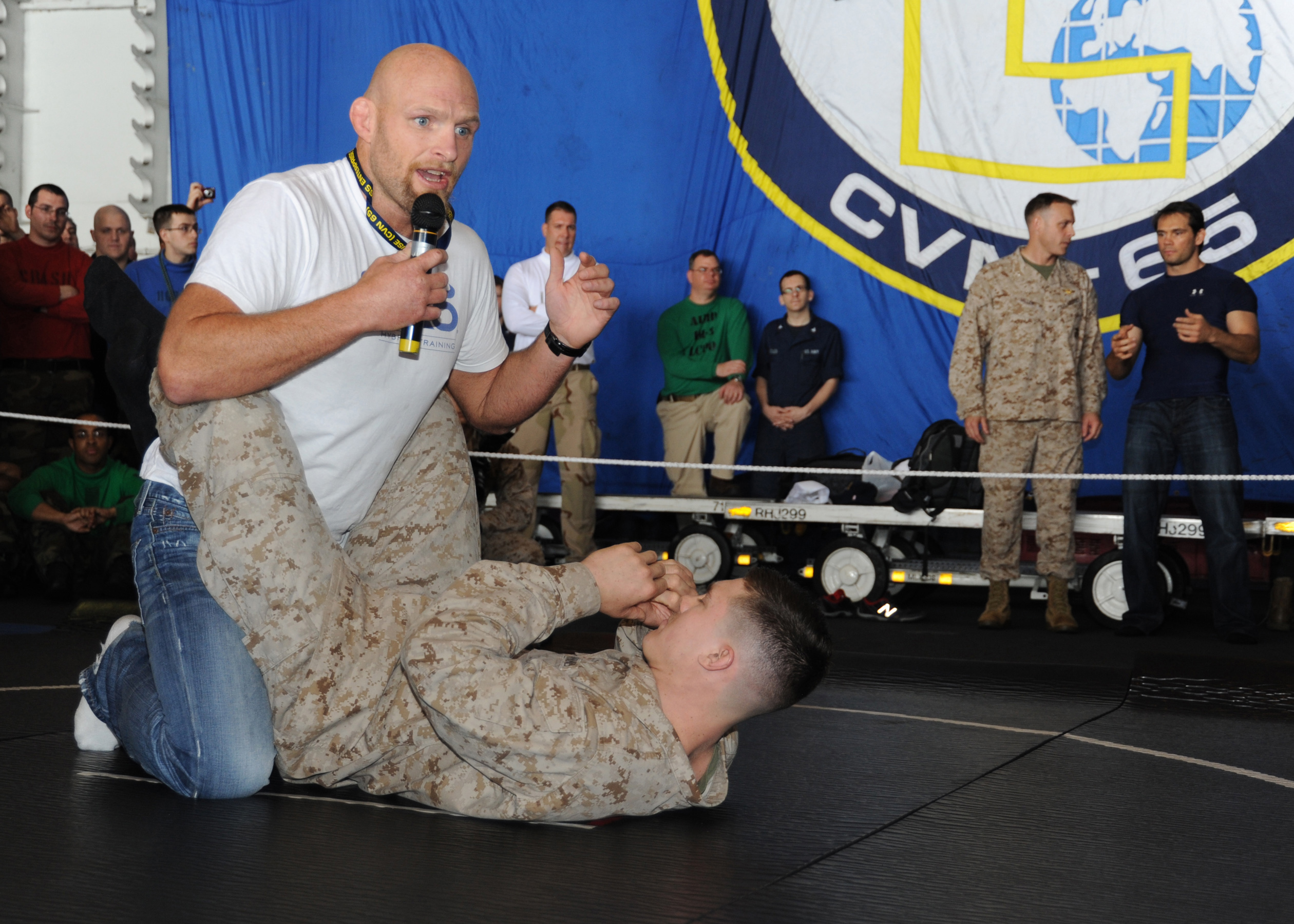
Jardine aboard USS Enterprise (CVN-65) demonstrating grappling techniques during a USO tour

Jardine was then matched up against former long-time UFC Light Heavyweight Champion, Chuck Liddell at UFC 76. The bout was Liddell's first fight since losing his belt to Quinton Jackson. Jardine landed numerous unchecked leg kicks and several body kicks to Liddell's side throughout the fight, which was spent almost totally on the feet. The bout was ruled a split decision in Jardine's favor, turning him into a top contender for the UFC Light Heavyweight Championship. First, however, Jardine faced former PRIDE Middleweight Champion Wanderlei Silva. Silva swarmed Jardine with punches and knocked him out just 36 seconds into the first round. Jardine had to be helped up after the fight and was sent to the local hospital for observation.

After this loss, Jardine faced Brandon Vera at UFC 89. Although it appeared that Vera damaged Jardine's knee with a front kick in the second round, Jardine ultimately earned a split decision victory over Vera. In a post-fight interview, Jardine stated that the injury was minor. With the victory, Jardine earned a shot at Quinton Jackson at UFC 96. Although the fight was considered an elimination bout for title contention, Jardine and former UFC Light Heavyweight Champion Rashad Evans are close friends and training partners and both have stated that they will not fight each other. In a close fight, Jardine lost by unanimous decision. The bout was the Fight of the Night earning them a $60,000 bonus. Jardine was the last man to fight Jackson before his temporary retirement.

Jardine was knocked out by Thiago Silva at UFC 102 1:35 in the first round.

Jardine suffered his second consecutive knockout and third straight loss at the hands of Ryan Bader on February 21, 2010, at UFC 110. After being rocked by a straight right from Bader, he received a flying knee to the ribs and then a hook punch to the chin that knocked him out, two minutes into the third round.

Jardine faced Matt Hamill on June 19, 2010, at The Ultimate Fighter: Team Liddell vs. Team Ortiz Finale. He lost the fight via majority decision, in a bout that earned Fight of the Night honors. Subsequently, he was released by the UFC on June 24, 2010.

=== Independent promotions ===
Jardine's first fight since leaving the UFC was against Shark Fights Light Heavyweight Champion Trevor Prangley in a non-title bout at Shark Fights 13: Jardine vs. Prangley on September 11, 2010. Jardine lost to Prangley via split decision, bringing his losing streak to five-in-a-row. After the fight he was given an indefinite suspension by the Texas Department of Licensing and Regulation for shoving referee Steve Armstrong prior to the fight.

Jardine was scheduled to face Francisco France at Nemesis Fighting: MMA Global Invasion on November 13, 2010, but the event was postponed to avoid a storm. The new date for the event was December 10, 2010.

Jardine defeated Francisco via unanimous decision and snapped his five fight losing streak. The win at Nemesis was surrounded by controversy, as there were no judges at the event. Jardine and other fighters on the card were also never paid by the promotion.

Jardine next took on MFC veteran Aron Lofton in an event near Albuquerque, New Mexico. Jardine was victorious via TKO (punches) at 3:30 of the first round.

=== Strikeforce ===
Jardine signed with Strikeforce as a late replacement for the injured Mike Kyle to face Gegard Mousasi on the April 9th card in San Diego. The hard-fought fight ultimately ended in a majority draw due to Mousasi being docked one point in the first round for an illegal upkick. Strikeforce CEO Scott Coker has stated a rematch may be in the cards in the near future.

Jardine stated that after his fight with Mousasi, he will drop down to the Middleweight division and that he wants to fight former Strikeforce Middleweight Champion Cung Le.

Jardine faced Luke Rockhold for the Strikeforce Middleweight Championship at Strikeforce: Rockhold vs. Jardine on January 7, 2012. He lost the fight via TKO in the first round.

Jardine next faced Roger Gracie at Strikeforce: Rockhold vs. Kennedy on July 14 and lost via unanimous decision after being cut open in the first round by an elbow from mount by Gracie.

In an interview with MMA Fight Corner in 2013, Jardine described himself as "semi-retired" and is unsure if he will return to the cage.

== Professional boxing career ==
Jardine has fought four bouts as a professional boxer. His professional boxing record is three wins with one draw. His last boxing bout was a draw against Jason Cordova that took place on August 20, 2004.

== Acting career ==
In 2009, Jardine appeared in the movies Crank: High Voltage (starring Jason Statham) and Gamer (starring Gerard Butler). He was also featured in Breaking Bad (starring fellow Canoga Park High School Alumnus Bryan Cranston) Season 3 episode "I.F.T", where he played a criminal who gets into a bar fight. He has appeared in small roles in various other films such as Tactical Force, Beer For My Horses, Unrivaled and Death Warrior. On February 11, 2013, he starred in the Hawaii Five-O episode "Kekoa". In 2014, he appeared in the films John Wick, Inherent Vice and Shot Caller. In 2016, he appears in Preacher, playing one of Odin's employees, Verne. He makes a brief appearance in the Bruce Willis film Once Upon a Time in Venice. Jardine also played Dyer Howe, a member of Frank Griffin's gang, in the Netflix series Godless, released in November 2017, and the film Bird Box, released in December 2018.

Jardine portrayed Pete in Vincent D'Onofrio's 2019 film The Kid. In December 2023, he served as director on the psychological thriller Killer Kafé, in his directorial debut. Jardine also had a minor role as Chester in Rose Glass's Love Lies Bleeding (2024).

In 2025, Jardine made his feature film writing and directing debut with the time loop thriller Kill Me Again starring Brendan Fehr, Majandra Delfino and Jardine in a supporting role.

== Personal life ==
As of August 2021, Jardine is engaged to MMA Women's Atomweight fighter Jodie Esquibel, who was a contestant on The Ultimate Fighter: Team Joanna vs. Team Cláudia. In 2014 Jardine featured on a social media video that went viral where he proceeded to track down a thief and make a citizen's arrest.

== Mixed martial arts record ==
Professional record breakdown
30 matches	17 wins	11 losses
By knockout	8	6
By submission	2	0
By decision	7	5
Draws	2	

Res.	Record	Opponent	Method	Event	Date	Round	Time	Location	Notes
Loss	17–11–2	Roger Gracie	Decision (unanimous)	Strikeforce: Rockhold vs. Kennedy	July 14, 2012	3	5:00	Portland, Oregon, United States	
Loss	17–10–2	Luke Rockhold	TKO (punches)	Strikeforce: Rockhold vs. Jardine	January 7, 2012	1	4:26	Las Vegas, Nevada, United States	Middleweight debut. For the Strikeforce Middleweight Championship.
Draw	17–9–2	Gegard Mousasi	Draw (majority)	Strikeforce: Diaz vs. Daley	April 9, 2011	3	5:00	San Diego, California, United States	Mousasi was deducted one point due to an illegal upkick.
Win	17–9–1	Aron Lofton	TKO (punches)	Fresquez Productions	March 4, 2011	1	3:30	Albuquerque, New Mexico, United States	
Win	16–9–1	Francisco France	Decision (unanimous)	Nemesis Fighting: MMA Global Invasion	December 10, 2010	3	5:00	Punta Cana, Dominican Republic	
Loss	15–9–1	Trevor Prangley	Decision (split)	Shark Fights 13: Jardine vs Prangley	September 11, 2010	3	5:00	Amarillo, Texas, United States	
Loss	15–8–1	Matt Hamill	Decision (majority)	The Ultimate Fighter: Team Liddell vs. Team Ortiz Finale	June 19, 2010	3	5:00	Las Vegas, Nevada, United States	Fight of the Night.
Loss	15–7–1	Ryan Bader	KO (punch)	UFC 110	February 21, 2010	3	2:10	Sydney, Australia	
Loss	15–6–1	Thiago Silva	TKO (punches)	UFC 102	August 29, 2009	1	1:35	Portland, Oregon, United States	
Loss	15–5–1	Quinton Jackson	Decision (unanimous)	UFC 96	March 7, 2009	3	5:00	Columbus, Ohio, United States	Fight of the Night.
Win	15–4–1	Brandon Vera	Decision (split)	UFC 89	October 18, 2008	3	5:00	Birmingham, England	
Loss	14–4–1	Wanderlei Silva	KO (punches)	UFC 84	May 24, 2008	1	0:36	Las Vegas, Nevada, United States	
Win	14–3–1	Chuck Liddell	Decision (split)	UFC 76	September 22, 2007	3	5:00	Anaheim, California, United States	
Loss	13–3–1	Houston Alexander	KO (punches)	UFC 71	May 26, 2007	1	0:48	Las Vegas, Nevada, United States	
Win	13–2–1	Forrest Griffin	TKO (punches)	UFC 66: Liddell vs. Ortiz	December 30, 2006	1	4:41	Las Vegas, Nevada, United States	Knockout of the Night.
Win	12–2–1	Wilson Gouveia	Decision (unanimous)	The Ultimate Fighter: Team Ortiz vs. Team Shamrock Finale	June 24, 2006	3	5:00	Las Vegas, Nevada, United States	
Loss	11–2–1	Stephan Bonnar	Decision (unanimous)	UFC Fight Night 4	April 6, 2006	3	5:00	Las Vegas, Nevada, United States	
Win	11–1–1	Mike Whitehead	Decision (unanimous)	UFC 57: Liddell vs. Couture 3	February 4, 2006	3	5:00	Las Vegas, Nevada, United States	Light Heavyweight debut.
Win	10–1–1	Kerry Schall	TKO (leg kicks)	The Ultimate Fighter 2 Finale	November 5, 2005	2	3:28	Las Vegas, Nevada, United States	
Win	9–1–1	Arman Gambaryan	Submission (armbar)	M-1 MFC: Heavyweight GP	December 4, 2004	1	2:37	Moscow, Russia	
Win	8–1–1	Tom Elrite	KO (punches)	Independent Event	November 13, 2004	1	2:50	New Mexico, United States	
Win	7–1–1	Brian Bair	TKO (punches)	Venom: First Strike	September 18, 2004	1	2:02	Huntington Beach, California, United States	
Draw	6–1–1	Keiichiro Yamamiya	Draw (unanimous)	Pancrase - Hybrid 8	October 4, 2003	2	5:00	Osaka, Japan	
Win	6–1	George Allen	Decision (unanimous)	KOTC 24: Mayhem	June 14, 2003	2	5:00	Albuquerque, New Mexico, United States	
Win	5–1	Allan Sullivan	TKO (punches)	KOTC 21: Invasion	February 21, 2003	2	1:56	Albuquerque, New Mexico, United States	
Win	4–1	Bryan Pardoe	KO (punches)	KOTC 20 - Crossroads	December 15, 2002	1	1:09	Bernalillo, New Mexico, United States	
Win	3–1	Philip Preece	Decision (unanimous)	KOTC 14 - 5150	June 19, 2002	2	5:00	Bernalillo, New Mexico, United States	
Loss	2–1	Travis Wiuff	KO (punch)	EC 46	February 16, 2002	1	0:06	Clive, Iowa, United States	
Win	2–0	Abe Andujo	TKO (punches)	Rage in the Cage 31	November 7, 2001	1	1:20	Phoenix, Arizona, United States	
Win	1–0	Amir Rahnavardi	Submission (armbar)	GC 5	August 19, 2001	1	2:44	Denver, Colorado, United States	

== Mixed martial arts exhibition record ==
Professional record breakdown
1 match	0 wins	1 loss
By knockout	0	0
By submission	0	0
By decision	0	1

Res.	Record	Opponent	Method	Event	Date	Round	Time	Location	Notes
Loss	0–1	Rashad Evans	Decision (unanimous)	The Ultimate Fighter 2	October 31, 2005 (air date)	3	5:00	Las Vegas, Nevada, United States	TUF 2 Semi-finals bout.

== Professional boxing record ==
4 fights	3 wins	0 losses
By knockout	1	0
By decision	2	0
Draws	1	

No.	Result	Record	Opponent	Method	Round, time	Date	Location	Notes
4	Draw	3–0–1	Jason Cordova	PTS	6	Aug 20, 2004	Isleta Casino & Resort, Albuquerque, New Mexico, U.S.	
3	Win	3–0	Augustine Trujillo	MD	4	Jun 27, 2004	Sandia Casino, Albuquerque, New Mexico, U.S.	
2	Win	2–0	Che Velarde	UD	4	May 5, 2004	Radisson Graystone Castle, Thornton, Colorado, U.S.	
1	Win	1–0	Jose Beltran	TKO	2 (4)	Dec 12, 2003	Kiva Auditorium, Albuquerque, New Mexico, U.S.	

== Championships and accomplishments ==
- Ultimate Fighting Championship
  - Fight of the Night (Two times) vs. Quinton Jackson and Matt Hamill
  - Knockout of the Night (One time) vs. Forrest Griffin
  - UFC.com Awards
    - 2006: Ranked #10 Knockout of the Year vs. Forrest Griffin (Tied with Alan Belcher)
    - 2007: Ranked #7 Upset of the Year vs. Chuck Liddell

== See also ==
- List of male boxers
- List of male mixed martial artists
- List of mixed martial artists with professional boxing records
- List of multi-sport athletes
- List of Strikeforce alumni
