= Bobby Southworth =

American mixed martial arts fighter

- Born: Bobby Southworth; December 16, 1969 (age 56); Madison, Wisconsin, United States
- Height: 6 ft 1 in (185 cm)
- Weight: 228 lb (103 kg; 16.3 st)
- Division: Light Heavyweight; Heavyweight
- Reach: 76 in (193 cm)
- Style: Brazilian Jiu-Jitsu, Kickboxing, Wrestling, Boxing
- Fighting out of: Santa Cruz, California
- Team: Cesar Gracie Jiu-Jitsu; Gracie Systems; Ralph Gracie Jiu-jitsu (1996–1997); American Kickboxing Academy (1997–2003, 2004–present)
- Rank: Black belt in Brazilian Jiu-Jitsu under Dave Camarillo
- Years active: 1999–2010

Mixed martial arts record
- Total: 17
- Wins: 10
- By knockout: 6
- By submission: 2
- By decision: 2
- Losses: 6
- By knockout: 3
- By submission: 2
- By decision: 1
- No contests: 1

Other information
- University: UC Davis
- Mixed martial arts record from Sherdog

Bobby Southworth (born December 16, 1969) is an American retired mixed martial artist who fought in the Light Heavyweight division.

He has fought in PRIDE FC and appeared on Season 1 of The Ultimate Fighter. He was the first Strikeforce Light Heavyweight Champion.

== Background ==
Southworth was born in Madison, Wisconsin, and was adopted when he was six weeks old. Southworth has three sisters. He grew up in Santa Cruz, California. He liked surfing as a hobby, as well as playing football and basketball, and track. After graduating from Soquel High School, Southworth continued to Cabrillo College, then UC Davis, playing basketball at both.

His initial interest in martial arts was sparked after seeing Royce Gracie at UFC 1 and UFC 2. While Southworth was looking for a sport to stay fit, a friend invited him to a jiu-jitsu class in a nearby gym. Instantly hooked by the discipline, Southworth joined Cesar Gracie Jiu-Jitsu academy before moving on to Gracie Systems, which was formed after Cesar's cousin Ralph Gracie moved stateside. Subsequently, Ralph opened his own academy in Mountain View, California, where Southworth continued teaching and training jiu-jitsu. Southworth grew interested in taking a no-holds-barred bout, which Gracie disapproved of, leading to Southworth's departure from the academy. Subsequently he joined American Kickboxing Academy, which at the time had no proper Brazilian jiu-jitsu program, so he took the responsibility of teaching the discipline.

== Mixed martial arts career ==
Southworth's first major exposure in the mixed martial arts world was when he faced Vitor Belfort on two-weeks short notice at PRIDE 13 on March 25, 2001. Southworth was overwhelmed by the Brazilian veteran and lost by rear naked choke in the first round.

In late 2003, Southworth had a falling out over money with Javier Mendez and briefly retired from the sport. Still having the spark to compete, Southworth mended fences with Mendez and rejoined the academy about a year later.

=== Return from retirement ===
Southworth then appeared on Season 1 of The Ultimate Fighter. He won his first preliminary fight against Lodune Sincaid, but lost the second versus Stephan Bonnar by split decision. Bobby returned to the house as a possible replacement for Forrest Griffin, should he not have been medically cleared to fight in the semifinals, but Forrest's cut healed safely and Southworth did not fight again until the undercard of the finale, where he fought a man he picked on in the house Sam Hoger and was defeated. It was a unanimous decision victory for Sam Hoger.

=== Strikeforce ===
Southworth next moved to Strikeforce, where his first fight was against James "The Sandman" Irvin. The bout was declared a No-Contest after a mere 17 seconds when in a freak accident, Southworth and Irvin's clinch pressed against the cage, pushing open the cage door and causing Irvin to fall out of the ring.

In his next fight, Southworth was given the opportunity to fight for Strikeforce's vacant light heavyweight championship against Vernon "Tiger" White. Southworth won a decision victory, taking White down repeatedly and controlling the pace of the match.

Southworth's next fight was a non-title bout against Anthony Ruiz, a fight that Ruiz won by way of TKO (cut) in round 2. A rematch was set up, but this time it would be for Southworth's championship. In a rather slow-paced fight, Southworth defeated Ruiz via 5-round Unanimous Decision on June 27, 2008 and thus became the only man to successfully defend the Strikeforce Light Heavyweight Championship.

In his next title defense, at Strikeforce: Destruction on November 21, 2008, Southworth lost the light heavyweight championship against former UFC Light Heavyweight fighter Renato Sobral "Babalu" by TKO (cut) of the 1st round at 5:00. Southworth was winning the round, having scored a takedown and controlling the clinch, until "Babalu" opened up a horrendous gash above Bobby's left eye with ten seconds to go. "Big" John McCarthy stopped the action to let doctors inspect, and Southworth finished the round by dropping "Babalu" with a punch just before the bell. However, when doctors got a better look at the wound between rounds, the fight was stopped due to the size and depth of the cut. Southworth announced he would like a rematch and Sobral verbally agreed, however a rematch was never organized and following Sobral's 2013 retirement it is unlikely a rematch would ever occur.

=== Post-Strikeforce career ===
Southworth also tried out for 11th season of The Ultimate Fighter. However, despite the fact that both the Middleweights and Light-Heavyweights were invited to try out, the UFC decided that the season would focus exclusively on Middleweights.

In the last bout of his career, Southworth faced Aaron Boyes at Xtreme MMA 2 on July 31, 2010. He won the fight via first-round knockout.

== Personal life ==
Bobby has four children, three daughters and one son.

Bobby co-founded the American Kickboxing Academy Sunnyvale in 2008. In 2015, Southworth began coaching at UFC Gym Hollow Brook in San Antonio, Texas.

== Championships and accomplishments ==
- Strikeforce
  - Strikeforce Light Heavyweight Championship (One time, First)
  - One Successful Title Defense
  - The only fighter to have successfully defended the Light Heavyweight Championship

== Mixed martial arts record ==
Professional record breakdown
17 matches	10 wins	6 losses
By knockout	6	3
By submission	2	2
By decision	2	1
No contests	1	

Res.	Record	Opponent	Method	Event	Date	Round	Time	Location	Notes
Win	10–6 (1)	Aaron Boyes	TKO (punches)	Xtreme MMA 2	July 31, 2010	1	1:56	Sydney, NSW, Australia	
Loss	9–6 (1)	Renato Sobral	TKO (cut)	Strikeforce: Destruction	November 21, 2008	1	5:00	San Jose, California, United States	Lost the Strikeforce Light Heavyweight Championship.
Win	9–5 (1)	Anthony Ruiz	Decision (unanimous)	Strikeforce: Melendez vs. Thomson	June 27, 2008	5	5:00	San Jose, California, United States	Defended the Strikeforce Light Heavyweight Championship.
Loss	8–5 (1)	Anthony Ruiz	TKO (cut)	Strikeforce: Four Men Enter, One Man Survives	November 16, 2007	2	0:52	San Jose, California, United States	Non-title bout.
Win	8–4 (1)	Bill Mahood	TKO (rib injury)	Strikeforce: Playboy Mansion	September 29, 2007	1	1:15	Beverly Hills, California, United States	
Win	7–4 (1)	Vernon White	Decision (unanimous)	Strikeforce: Triple Threat	December 8, 2006	5	5:00	San Jose, California, United States	Won the inaugural Strikeforce Light Heavyweight Championship.
NC	6–4 (1)	James Irvin	No Contest	Strikeforce: Revenge	June 9, 2006	1	0:17	San Jose, California, United States	Both fighters fell from the cage.
Loss	6–4	Sam Hoger	Decision (unanimous)	The Ultimate Fighter 1 Finale	April 9, 2005	3	5:00	Las Vegas, Nevada, United States	
Win	6–3	Bryan Pardoe	TKO	X-1	September 6, 2003	2	0:14	Yokohama, Japan	
Win	5–3	Brian Vanderwalle	Submission (armbar)	IFC WC 18: Big Valley Brawl	July 19, 2003	1	4:28	Lakeport, California, United States	
Loss	4–3	David Pa'aluhi	KO	Warriors Quest 4: Genesis	March 29, 2002	1	0:16	Honolulu, Hawaii, United States	
Win	4–2	Floyd Sword	TKO	IFC WC 14: Warriors Challenge 14	July 18, 2001	3	5:00	Friant, California, United States	
Loss	3–2	Vitor Belfort	Submission (rear-naked choke)	PRIDE 13: Collision Course	March 25, 2001	1	4:09	Saitama, Saitama, Japan	
Win	3–1	Ivan Sequet	TKO (submission to strikes)	Bushido 1	January 18, 2001	1		Tempe, Arizona, United States	
Win	2–1	Toby Oberdine	Submission (choke)	IFC WC 10: Warriors Challenge 10	October 11, 2000	1	2:30	Friant, California, United States	
Win	1–1	Bob Ostovich	TKO (punches)	SB 12: SuperBrawl 12	June 1, 1999	1	4:22	Honolulu, Hawaii, United States	
Loss	0–1	Jason Godsey	Submission (choke)	Neutral Grounds 12	May 28, 1999	N/A		United States	

New championship	1st Strikeforce Light Heavyweight Champion; December 8, 2006-November 21, 2008	Succeeded by Renato Sobral
