= Rashad Evans =

American mixed martial arts fighter (born 1979)

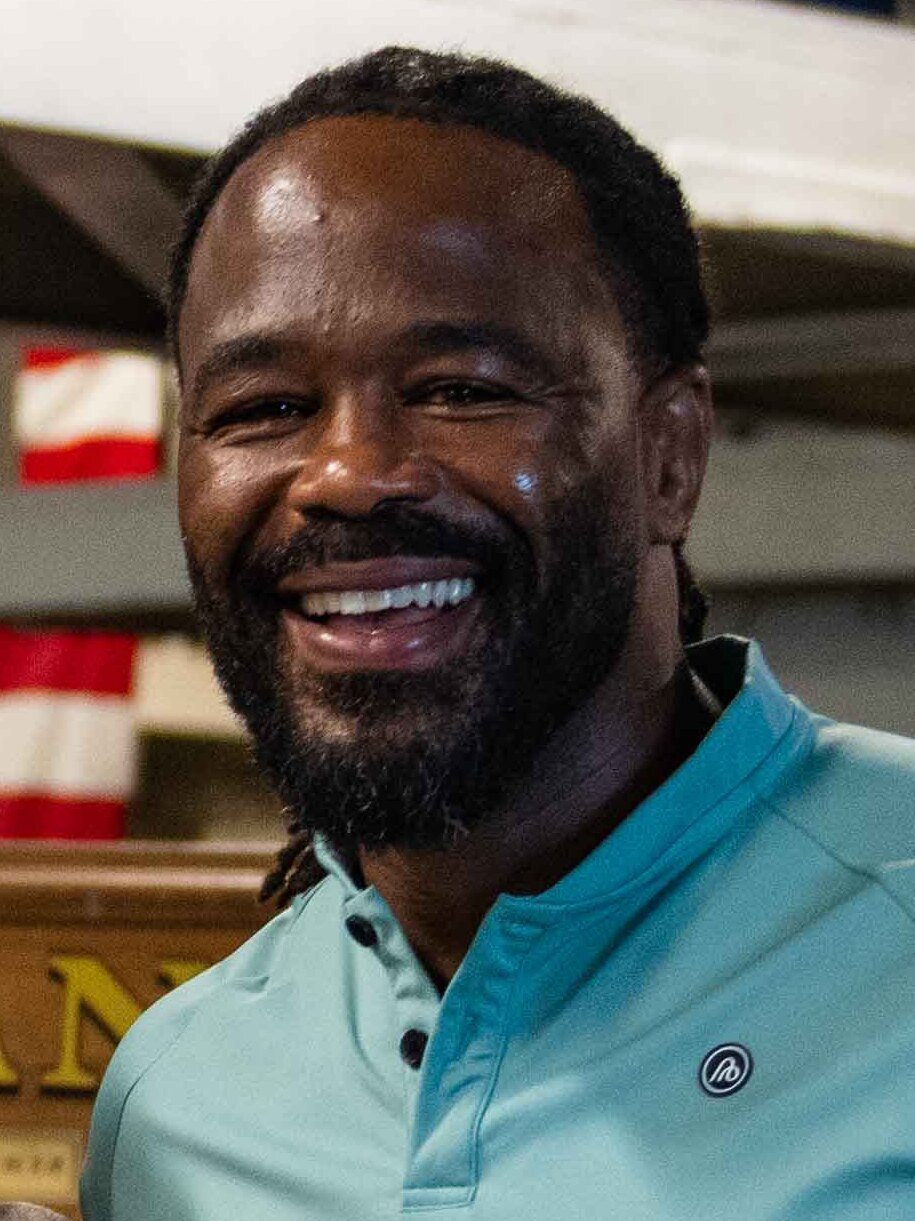
- Evans in 2024
- Born: September 25, 1979 (age 47); Niagara Falls, New York, U.S.
- Nickname: Suga
- Height: 5 ft 11 in (180 cm)
- Weight: 205 lb (93 kg; 14 st 9 lb)
- Division: Middleweight (2017); Light Heavyweight (2004–2016, 2018, 2022); Heavyweight (2005)
- Reach: 75 in (191 cm)
- Style: Wrestling
- Fighting out of: Boca Raton, Florida, U.S.
- Team: Jackson Wink MMA Academy (until 2011); Blackzilians (2011–2017); Kill Cliff FC (2017–2022)
- Rank: Black belt in No-Gi Brazilian Jiu-Jitsu under Rolles Gracie; Black belt in Gaidojutsu
- Wrestling: NCAA Division I Wrestling
- Years active: 2003–2018, 2022

Mixed martial arts record
- Total: 29
- Wins: 20
- By knockout: 8
- By submission: 1
- By decision: 11
- Losses: 8
- By knockout: 3
- By decision: 5
- Draws: 1

Other information
- Occupation: MMA fighter
- University: Michigan State University; Niagara County C.C.
- Children: 5
- Website: www.rashadevans.tv
- Mixed martial arts record from Sherdog
Medal record
Men's collegiate wrestling
Representing the Michigan State Spartans
Big Ten Championships
Bronze medal – third place	2003 Madison	174 lb
- Last updated on: July 22, 2011

Rashad Evans (born September 25, 1979) is an American former mixed martial artist who competed in the Light Heavyweight division. Evans started his professional MMA career in 2003, and was the Heavyweight winner of The Ultimate Fighter 2 in 2005. In 2008, Evans won the UFC Light Heavyweight Championship, and in 2019, was inducted into the UFC Hall of Fame.

In present day, he serves on the UFC broadcasting team as a desk analyst while also advocating for the health benefits of functional mushrooms through his company Umbo, co-founded alongside former NFL quarterback, Jake Plummer.

== Wrestling career ==
Wrestling out of Niagara-Wheatfield High School in Sanborn, New York, Evans twice made it to the state finals tournament of New York by winning his weight class for his region, in which he received All-State honors both times. In 1997 he placed 4th in the state at 145 pounds. In 1998 he placed 4th in the state at 171 pounds. In 1999 he entered the National Junior College Athletic Association National Championships for the 165 pound weight class in which he finished in 4th place. Competing once again at this tournament in 2000, he was the champion of the 165 pound weight class.

Moving on to the NCAA Division I wrestling, Evans competed for Michigan State, in the Big Ten conference. In 2002 he finished in 4th place in the conference championships, losing a decision to fellow future UFC competitor Jacob Volkmann in the third place match. In addition to Volkmann, this 174 pound weight class also saw more future UFC competitors with Gerald Harris and Josh Koscheck competing in it this year. In 2003, Evans again competed in the 174 pound weight class, capturing 3rd place in the Big Ten Championships. Entering the NCAA Division 1 championships on top of this 3rd-place finish, Evans won his opening match before losing a close 3–0 decision to the eventual national champion, Robbie Waller. Staying alive through the consolation bracket Evans pinned his next opponent before being matched up with legend Greg Jones, a 3x National Champion who would finish his college career with a record of 126–4. Evans won the match via 3–2 decision, becoming one of only 4 people to defeat Jones in his college career. Evans lost his next match to Purdue's Ryan Lange, in a close 3–2 decision, ending his college career. A win would have qualified him for All-American status. He finished his career at Michigan State with a record of 48 wins and 34 losses.

== Mixed martial arts ==
=== Early career ===
In 2004, under the tutelage of future UFC Hall of Famer Dan Severn, Evans competed in five professional mixed martial arts fights, winning all five. This led to his selection as one of the nine heavyweights to compete on The Ultimate Fighter 2, a reality TV series on Spike. The season began airing on August 22, 2005, culminating in a live finale between the final two fighters of each weight division, held in Las Vegas, Nevada, on November 5, 2005. Rashad Evans is also a black belt in Gaidojutsu and Brazilian jiu-jitsu, and studied karate as a child.

=== The Ultimate Fighter ===
At 5 feet 10.5 inches (1.791 m) and 225 pounds (102 kg), Evans was the shortest and the second-lightest of the nine heavyweight competitors. He was considered the underdog in each of his fights, but made it to the finals by defeating Tom Murphy, Mike Whitehead, and Keith Jardine all by decision. During his tenure on the show, Evans was criticized by opposing coach Matt Hughes for his showboating during fights, but the two eventually settled their differences, and Hughes even cornered Evans for his semifinal bout. In the finale, Evans defeated 6 ft 7 in (2.01 m) Brad Imes by split decision, thus winning a three-year, six-figure contract with the UFC and a brand new car. After The Ultimate Fighter, Evans joined Greg Jackson's Submission Fighting camp along with fellow competitor Keith Jardine, who would eventually become his training partner and good friend.

=== Ultimate Fighting Championship ===
==== Undefeated streak ====
Evans dropped down to light heavyweight after the show, deciding he would have a better chance of success in a lower weight class. His first fight under the contract took place on April 6, 2006, against Sam Hoger, who had been a semi-finalist on The Ultimate Fighter 1. Evans defeated Hoger via split decision despite nearly falling victim to a kimura submission at the end of the second round.

Evans followed with a victory by majority decision over The Ultimate Fighter 1 finalist Stephan Bonnar on June 28, 2006. Evans maintained control throughout the fight with repeated take downs, including a number of slams in the center of the cage and went on to secure the victory.

Three months later, Evans faced Jason Lambert at UFC 63. Lambert, riding an eight-fight win streak, was seen as Evans's first real test at 205 pounds. Evans controlled the fight from early on, and knocked Lambert out with punches from the mount in the second round. It was his first stoppage victory in over two years.

Evans next headlined UFC Fight Night: Evans vs Salmon against UFC newcomer Sean Salmon, a highly decorated collegiate wrestler who held a 9–1 professional record. Though Salmon had won the first round by scoring two takedowns, Evans came back with a head kick knockout early in the second round. Salmon remained motionless for several minutes after the fight and was eventually carried out on a stretcher to a local hospital. The kick came to the surprise of many fans who had previously considered Evans a one-dimensional wrestler. This fight earned him another Knockout of the Night award.

At UFC 73, Evans squared off against former UFC Light Heavyweight Champion Tito Ortiz. The two competitors fought to a draw as all three judges scored the bout 28–28. Ortiz had won two out of three rounds on all scorecards, but was docked a point for holding the cage fence to defend against a takedown by Evans. Immediately after the fight, Ortiz asked for a rematch. At a press conference following UFC 73, UFC President Dana White promised a rematch which, for various reasons relating to scheduling, did not occur until 4 years later at UFC 133.

Unable to get a rematch with Ortiz, Evans made his debut as a headliner on a pay-per-view event at UFC 78 instead, against fellow undefeated fighter and The Ultimate Fighter 3 winner Michael Bisping. After three close rounds, Evans came out on top on two of the judges' scorecards, winning by split decision. This fight marked Bisping's first loss and his final bout in the light heavyweight division. After his win over Bisping, Evans drastically changed his fighting style, which he kept secret until his fight against UFC Legend Chuck Liddell.

==== Evans vs. Liddell ====
Entering the fight as a very heavy underdog, Evans shocked the world by knocking out former light heavyweight champion Chuck Liddell in brutal fashion at UFC 88. Liddell threw an uppercut that Evans countered with an overhand right, landing flush. Liddell remained unconscious for several minutes before finally walking out of the cage under his own power. This fight earned him another Knockout of the Night award. The knockout was awarded knockout of the year by Sherdog for 2008. Evans had previously been scheduled to face Liddell at UFC 85 as a replacement for the injured Mauricio Rua. When Liddell pulled out of the event due to an injured hamstring, Evans was matched with James Irvin. When Irvin pulled out after breaking his foot, the fight was removed from the card altogether. After the fight, UFC President Dana White confirmed in the post-event press conference that Evans's next fight would be a title shot against newly crowned light heavyweight champion Forrest Griffin at UFC 92.

==== Winning the Light Heavyweight Championship ====
On December 27, 2008, at UFC 92, Evans faced champion Forrest Griffin for the UFC Light Heavyweight belt. Griffin controlled most of the first two rounds with effective striking and low kicks. In the third round, however, Evans caught a low kick and countered with a straight right hand that dropped Griffin. Evans followed Griffin to the ground and eventually managed to finish the stunned champion with punches inside Griffin's guard. With the victory, Evans became the new UFC Light Heavyweight Champion. It capped off a year in which Evans won Fighter of the Year honors from Sherdog.com. This fight earned him a $60,000 Fight of the Night award.

==== Losing the title ====
Evans's first defense of the UFC Light Heavyweight title against challenger Lyoto Machida ended in a knockout loss. During a flurry of punches from Machida, Evans started trash talking Machida telling him 'his hands were made of pillows'. Machida continued his onslaught, knocking the champion out. A photograph of Evans's face during the knockout became an infamous meme called "Shad face" among MMA fans. This was the first loss of his career and the 15th straight win of Lyoto Machida's career. Then, Evans went on to coach against Rampage Jackson in The Ultimate Fighter: Heavyweights. Evans was scheduled to fight Jackson on December 12, 2009, at UFC 107, but this was canceled due to Jackson being cast for the A-Team movie. On September 22, 2009, Jackson wrote in a blog on his website that he is "done fighting" because of events that occurred between Jackson and Dana White, the president of the UFC. Thiago Silva was named as Evans' next opponent at UFC 108.

==== Back into title contention ====
Evans fought Thiago Silva in the main event of UFC 108 on January 2, 2010. Dana White was quoted as saying that if Evans could defeat Thiago Silva at UFC 108, then he would go on to face Quinton "Rampage" Jackson. During the Spike TV broadcast of the UFC 108 preliminary card, Evans confirmed that he received his Brazilian Jiu Jitsu black belt under Rolles Gracie that morning. Evans would go on to defeat Thiago Silva – another BJJ black belt – by unanimous decision. Deviating from his usual standing and striking, Evans displayed his grappling skills with numerous takedowns that frustrated Silva throughout the match, but Evans failed to damage Silva substantially while on the ground. In the third round, after severely mocking his opponent's fighting style with various taunts, Silva connected with a right hook to Evans's jaw, rocking him. Silva hesitated in finishing Evans off in order to return the taunting, however, and Evans was able to recover leading to a UD win. Evans was expected to finally face rival Quinton Jackson at UFC 113, but the bout took place on May 29, 2010, at UFC 114.

Evans caught Jackson with a right hand early in the first round and throughout the rest of the fight tried to take Jackson down, succeeding three times out of nine. In the third round Evans was hurt by Jackson but recovered and ended the final round with another takedown and strikes on the ground. The judges scored the bout 30–27, 30–27, 29–28 giving Evans the unanimous decision. Afterwards UFC President Dana White officially confirmed that Evans would square off against Maurício Rua for the UFC Light Heavyweight title, but not until mid-Spring or early-Summer of 2011 as Rua recovered from knee surgery. The fight was then booked for the main event of UFC 128 when the UFC returned to Newark, New Jersey.

Following Evans's training partner Jon Jones's victory over Ryan Bader at UFC 126, it was announced that Evans injured his knee during training. Jones was then told in his post-fight interview that the UFC wanted him to replace Evans in his fight against Mauricio Rua for the UFC Light Heavyweight Championship. Jones accepted and the fight was set for UFC 128. It was then expected that if Jones won, he would face Evans in his first title defense.

During a UFC 128 post-fight interview with Ariel Helwani, Evans stated that he was done training at Jackson's Martial Arts in preparation for his fight with Jon Jones. He then commenced training at Imperial Athletics in Boca Raton, Florida, at a new camp co-founded by Evans and several Brazilian fighters who had concomitantly left American Top Team due to a dispute over management services; these were later joined by some African-American fighters, and as a result the camp's members became known colloquially as the "Blackzilians", especially on Twitter. Evans gave further insight to MMAWeekly about his leaving Jackson's Submission Fighting, "When you get to a certain point, you really need a lot of time (with the coaches)… make sure you get the one-on-one, and you just need different things," he explained. "After being at Jackson's for a while, with so many people at the gym, it just got harder and harder for me to get that time."

Evans/Jones was expected to take place on August 6, 2011, at UFC 133, but Jones was sidelined with a hand injury. Evans was expected to face rising prospect Phil Davis at the event instead. A title fight between José Aldo and Chad Mendes was delayed, so the UFC promoted Evans vs. Davis to serve as the main event. However, with less than four weeks until the event, Davis pulled out of the bout citing a knee injury. A rematch with Tito Ortiz was scheduled to headline the event. Evans defeated Ortiz at UFC 133 via TKO in the second round. The victory secured Evans a title shot against Jones. This fight earned him a $70,000 Fight of the Night award.

Evans and Jones were rumoured to finally clash on December 10, 2011, at UFC 140. However, a lingering thumb injury cost Evans another title opportunity, and he was replaced by Lyoto Machida to fight Jon Jones for the belt at UFC 140. Jones retained the Light Heavyweight belt, defeating the challenger Machida, which left open the possibility of a future fight between Evans and Jones for the title.

Evans faced Phil Davis on January 28, 2012, at UFC on Fox 2. He won the fight via unanimous decision. Evans out-wrestled the former division one national wrestling champion landing numerous takedowns throughout the fight.

In his second title shot, Evans faced UFC Light Heavyweight Champion Jon Jones on April 21, 2012, at UFC 145. Evans lost to Jones via unanimous decision.

In his first post-title shot fight, Evans faced Antônio Rogério Nogueira in the co-main event at UFC 156 on February 2, 2013. Nogueira won the fight via unanimous decision.

Evans faced Dan Henderson on June 15, 2013, in the main event at UFC 161. He won the fight by split decision.

Evans faced Chael Sonnen at UFC 167 in a Light Heavyweight bout on November 16, 2013, in the co-main event of the evening. He won the fight via TKO in the first round.

==== Injuries and Rehabilitation ====
Evans was expected to face Daniel Cormier at UFC 170 on February 22, 2014. However, a leg injury knocked him off the card just 10 days before the event. Originally expected to be out for a month, Evans was instead sidelined indefinitely.

Evans was linked to a potential bout with Alexander Gustafsson on January 24, 2015, at UFC on Fox 14. However, Evans announced he was not ready to accept a fight during that time frame as he was still rehabilitating a lingering knee injury.

Evans was expected to face Glover Teixeira on February 22, 2015, at UFC Fight Night 61. However, on January 7, Teixeira pulled out of the bout citing a slow to heal knee injury that he had sustained in his last fight. In turn, Evans was removed from the event entirely. A heavyweight bout between Antônio Silva and Frank Mir, previously scheduled for UFC 184, took place a week earlier and headlined the event.

Evans announced in mid-February 2015 that he expected to be sidelined an additional six to sevens months after undergoing another knee surgery and hoped to return by the end of 2015.

Evans faced Ryan Bader on October 3, 2015, at UFC 192. He lost the fight via unanimous decision.

A long discussed bout against Maurício Rua was rescheduled and was expected to take place on April 16, 2016, at UFC on Fox 19. However, Rua was pulled from the fight on March 9 in favor of a matchup with Corey Anderson a couple of weeks later at UFC 198 and was replaced by former title challenger Glover Teixeira. Evans lost the fight via knockout in the first round.

==== Drop to Middleweight, retirement and return to fighting ====
Evans was expected to face Tim Kennedy in a middleweight bout on November 12, 2016, at UFC 205. However, on November 8, Evans was pulled from the fight after an undisclosed irregularity was found during his pre-fight medical exam. Subsequently, Kennedy was removed from the card as well. The bout was quickly rescheduled and was expected to take place a month later at UFC 206. Once again, Evans was unable to obtain medical clearance to compete on the card and was pulled from the bout on November 21. An irregularity in his pre-fight tests was responsible for both removals and he is expected to undergo an additional screening with an neurologist to prove he is healthy enough to fight, before possibly returning to the cage in January or February, according to his manager. The Ultimate Fighter: Team Jones vs. Team Sonnen middleweight winner Kelvin Gastelum was his eventual replacement on the card.

Evans faced Dan Kelly on March 4, 2017, at UFC 209. He lost the back-and-forth fight via split decision.

Evans faced Sam Alvey on August 5, 2017, at UFC Fight Night 114. He lost the fight by split decision.

Evans faced Anthony Smith in a light heavyweight bout on June 9, 2018, at UFC 225. He lost the fight via knockout in the first round.

On June 25, 2018, Evans announced his retirement from MMA.

On May 18, 2019, Evans was announced to be inducted into UFC Hall of Fame on July 5, 2019.

On December 19, 2021, Evans is scheduled to compete in his first professional grappling match against Ryan Aitken under the Combat Jiu-Jitsu ruleset at the Featherweight edition of the CJJ World Championships.

=== Return from retirement ===
On September 20, 2019, news surfaced that by his request, Evans was released from the UFC in order to pursue a return from retirement in another organization. In December 2021, Evans revealed he would be fighting for the first time since 2018 for Khabib Nurmagomedov's Eagle Fighting Championship promotion. His comeback fight took place at Eagle FC 44 on January 28, 2022, against Gabriel Checco. Evans defeated Checco by unanimous decision.

On December 11, 2024, it was announced that Evans had signed with Global Fight League. On January 26, 2025 Evans stated "I was added to this without my consent!". In turn, in April 2025, it was reported that all GFL events were cancelled indefinitely.

== Boxing ==
Evans was scheduled to face Quinton Jackson in a boxing bout on April 12, 2025 at ICS Mania 1. However, the fight was cancelled due to unfulfilled contractual obligations.

== Freestyle wrestling ==
Evans is scheduled to challenge Khamzat Chimaev for the RAF Light Heavyweight Crossover Championship on December 19, 2026 at RAF 16.

== Personal life ==
Evans and his ex-wife have one son and a daughter. He also has a daughter from a previous relationship and a son who was born in 2015. On New Year's Eve 2020, Evans's wife, Celiana, gave birth to their second son.

Evans's brother Lance made a brief appearance on The Ultimate Fighter: Team Nogueira vs Team Mir, but was eliminated by Vinicius Magalhaes due to a rib injury and did not join the cast.

== In other media ==
Evans has appeared in a Microsoft commercial, where he says the lines, "You got a problem with that!" and "I'm a PC!", while sparring with an unidentified opponent. Evans was a frequent commentator on the ESPN show MMA Live. Evans also made an appearance on Spike TV's show Deadliest Warrior. In the episode, Evans easily pierces a pig carcass with the xyston similar to one used by Alexander the Great, and crushed a gel torso's throat with an elbow.

== Championships and accomplishments ==
=== Mixed martial arts ===
- Gladiator Challenge
  - GC Light Heavyweight Tournament Winner
- Ultimate Fighting Championship
  - UFC Hall of Fame (Modern wing, Class of 2019)
  - UFC Light Heavyweight Championship (One time)
  - The Ultimate Fighter 2 Heavyweight Tournament Winner
  - Fight of the Night (Two times) vs. Forrest Griffin and Tito Ortiz 2
  - Knockout of the Night (Two times) vs. Sean Salmon and Chuck Liddell
  - UFC Encyclopedia Awards
    - Fight of the Night (One time) vs. Brad Imes
  - Tied (Chuck Liddell & Magomed Ankalaev) for fifth most wins in UFC Light Heavyweight division history (13)
  - Second most takedowns landed in UFC Light Heavyweight division history (50)
  - UFC.com Awards
    - 2005: Ranked #4 Fight of the Year vs. Brad Imes
    - 2007: Ranked #4 Knockout of the Year vs. Sean Salmon
    - 2008: Fighter of the Year, Knockout of the Year vs. Chuck Liddell & Ranked #3 Upset of the Year vs. Chuck Liddell
    - 2010: Ranked #9 Fighter of the Year
- Sports Illustrated
  - 2008 Knockout of the Year vs. Chuck Liddell at UFC 88
- Sherdog
  - 2008 Fighter of the Year
  - 2008 Knockout of the Year vs. Chuck Liddell at UFC 88
  - Mixed Martial Arts Hall of Fame
- Bloody Elbow
  - 2008 Fighter of the Year
  - 2008 #2 Ranked Breakout Fighter of the Year
- Rear Naked News
  - 2008 Fighter of the Year
- MMA Fighting
  - 2008 UFC Knockout of the Year vs. Chuck Liddell at UFC 88
- FIGHT! Magazine
  - 2008 Knockout of the Year vs. Chuck Liddell at UFC 88

=== Amateur wrestling ===
- Niagara Wheatfield High School
  - 4th place New York State High School Wrestling Championships 145 lbs 1997, 171 lbs 1998
- National Junior College Athletic Association
  - Junior College National Champion 165 lb – out of Niagara County Community College (2000)

== Mixed martial arts record ==
Professional record breakdown
29 matches	20 wins	8 losses
By knockout	8	3
By submission	1	0
By decision	11	5
Draws	1	

Res.	Record	Opponent	Method	Event	Date	Round	Time	Location	Notes
Win	20–8–1	Gabriel Checco	Decision (unanimous)	Eagle FC 44	January 28, 2022	3	5:00	Miami, Florida, United States	
Loss	19–8–1	Anthony Smith	KO (knee)	UFC 225	June 9, 2018	1	0:53	Chicago, Illinois, United States	Return to Light Heavyweight.
Loss	19–7–1	Sam Alvey	Decision (split)	UFC Fight Night: Pettis vs. Moreno	August 5, 2017	3	5:00	Mexico City, Mexico	
Loss	19–6–1	Daniel Kelly	Decision (split)	UFC 209	March 4, 2017	3	5:00	Las Vegas, Nevada, United States	Middleweight debut.
Loss	19–5–1	Glover Teixeira	KO (punches)	UFC on Fox: Teixeira vs. Evans	April 16, 2016	1	1:48	Tampa, Florida, United States	
Loss	19–4–1	Ryan Bader	Decision (unanimous)	UFC 192	October 3, 2015	3	5:00	Houston, Texas, United States	
Win	19–3–1	Chael Sonnen	TKO (punches)	UFC 167	November 16, 2013	1	4:05	Las Vegas, Nevada, United States	
Win	18–3–1	Dan Henderson	Decision (split)	UFC 161	June 15, 2013	3	5:00	Winnipeg, Manitoba, Canada	
Loss	17–3–1	Antônio Rogério Nogueira	Decision (unanimous)	UFC 156	February 2, 2013	3	5:00	Las Vegas, Nevada, United States	
Loss	17–2–1	Jon Jones	Decision (unanimous)	UFC 145	April 21, 2012	5	5:00	Atlanta, Georgia, United States	For the UFC Light Heavyweight Championship.
Win	17–1–1	Phil Davis	Decision (unanimous)	UFC on Fox: Evans vs. Davis	January 28, 2012	5	5:00	Chicago, Illinois, United States	UFC Light Heavyweight title eliminator.
Win	16–1–1	Tito Ortiz	TKO (knee to the body and punches)	UFC 133	August 6, 2011	2	4:48	Philadelphia, Pennsylvania, United States	Fight of the Night.
Win	15–1–1	Quinton Jackson	Decision (unanimous)	UFC 114	May 29, 2010	3	5:00	Las Vegas, Nevada, United States	
Win	14–1–1	Thiago Silva	Decision (unanimous)	UFC 108	January 2, 2010	3	5:00	Las Vegas, Nevada, United States	
Loss	13–1–1	Lyoto Machida	KO (punches)	UFC 98	May 23, 2009	2	3:57	Las Vegas, Nevada, United States	Lost the UFC Light Heavyweight Championship.
Win	13–0–1	Forrest Griffin	KO (punches)	UFC 92	December 27, 2008	3	2:46	Las Vegas, Nevada, United States	Won the UFC Light Heavyweight Championship. Fight of the Night.
Win	12–0–1	Chuck Liddell	KO (punch)	UFC 88	September 6, 2008	2	1:51	Atlanta, Georgia, United States	Knockout of the Night.
Win	11–0–1	Michael Bisping	Decision (split)	UFC 78	November 17, 2007	3	5:00	Newark, New Jersey, United States	
Draw	10–0–1	Tito Ortiz	Draw (unanimous)	UFC 73	July 7, 2007	3	5:00	Sacramento, California, United States	Ortiz was deducted one point in round 2 for grabbing the fence.
Win	10–0	Sean Salmon	KO (head kick)	UFC Fight Night: Evans vs. Salmon	January 25, 2007	2	1:06	Hollywood, Florida, United States	Knockout of the Night.
Win	9–0	Jason Lambert	KO (punches)	UFC 63	September 23, 2006	2	2:22	Anaheim, California, United States	
Win	8–0	Stephan Bonnar	Decision (majority)	UFC Ultimate Fight Night 5	June 28, 2006	3	5:00	Las Vegas, Nevada, United States	
Win	7–0	Sam Hoger	Decision (split)	UFC Ultimate Fight Night 4	April 6, 2006	3	5:00	Las Vegas, Nevada, United States	Return to Light Heavyweight.
Win	6–0	Brad Imes	Decision (split)	The Ultimate Fighter 2 Finale	November 5, 2005	3	5:00	Las Vegas, Nevada, United States	Heavyweight debut. Won The Ultimate Fighter 2 Heavyweight Tournament.
Win	5–0	Jaime Jara	Decision (unanimous)	Gladiator Challenge 27	June 3, 2004	3	5:00	Colusa, California, United States	Won the Gladiator Challenge Light Heavyweight Tournament.
Win	4–0	Hector Ramirez	Decision (unanimous)	Gladiator Challenge 27	June 3, 2004	2	5:00	Colusa, California, United States	
Win	3–0	Bryan Pardoe	TKO (punches)	Gladiator Challenge 26	June 2, 2004	1	3:24	Colusa, California, United States	
Win	2–0	Danny Anderson	TKO (submission to punches)	Dangerzone: Cage Fighting	April 10, 2004	1	3:09	Osceola, Iowa, United States	
Win	1–0	Dennis Reed	Submission (anaconda choke)	Dangerzone: Cage Fighting	April 10, 2004	1	0:50	Osceola, Iowa, United States	Light Heavyweight debut.

== Mixed martial arts exhibition record ==
Professional record breakdown
3 matches	3 wins	0 losses
By decision	3	0

Res.	Record	Opponent	Method	Event	Date	Round	Time	Location	Notes
Win	3–0	Keith Jardine	Decision (unanimous)	The Ultimate Fighter 2	October 31, 2005 (air date)	3	5:00	Las Vegas, Nevada, United States	TUF 2 Semi-finals bout.
Win	2–0	Mike Whitehead	Decision (unanimous)	The Ultimate Fighter 2	October 17, 2005 (air date)	3	5:00	Las Vegas, Nevada, United States	TUF 2 Quarter-finals bout.
Win	1–0	Tom Murphy	Decision (unanimous)	The Ultimate Fighter 2	September 19, 2005 (air date)	3	5:00	Las Vegas, Nevada, United States	TUF 2 elimination round.

== Pay-per-view bouts ==
Date	Main event	Billing	Buys
7 July 2007	Ortiz vs. Evans (co)	UFC 73	425,000
17 November 2007	Evans vs. Bisping	UFC 78	400,000
6 September 2008	Liddell vs. Evans	UFC 88	480,000
27 December 2008	Griffin vs. Evans	UFC 92	1,000,000
23 May 2009	Evans vs. Machida	UFC 98	635,000
2 January 2010	Evans vs. Silva	UFC 108	300,000
29 May 2010	Rampage vs. Evans	UFC 114	1,050,000
6 August 2011	Evans vs. Ortiz	UFC 133	310,000
21 April 2012	Jones vs. Evans	UFC 145	700,000
2 February 2013	Evans vs. Nogueira (co)	UFC 156	330,000
15 June 2013	Evans vs. Henderson	UFC 161	140,000
16 November 2013	Evans vs. Sonnen (co)	UFC 167	630,000

== See also ==
- List of male mixed martial artists

Preceded by Forrest Griffin	9th UFC Light Heavyweight Champion; December 27, 2008 – May 23, 2009	Succeeded by Lyoto Machida
