= UFC Ultimate Fight Night 4 =

UFC mixed martial arts event in 2006

Ultimate Fight Night 4
- The poster for Ultimate Fight Night 4
- Promotion: Ultimate Fighting Championship
- Date: April 6, 2006
- Venue: Hard Rock Hotel and Casino
- City: Las Vegas, Nevada
- Attendance: 843
- Total gate: $199,150

Event chronology
UFC 58: USA vs Canada	Ultimate Fight Night 4	UFC 59: Reality Check

Ultimate Fight Night 4 was a mixed martial arts event held by the Ultimate Fighting Championship on April 6, 2006. The event took place at Hard Rock Hotel and Casino, in Las Vegas, Nevada and was broadcast live on Spike TV in the United States and Canada. The show drew a 1.6 overall rating and served as the lead-in for the season three premiere episode of The Ultimate Fighter.

== Results ==
Main Card
Weight class				Method	Round	Time	Notes
Light Heavyweight	Stephan Bonnar	def.	Keith Jardine	Decision (unanimous) (29–28, 29–28, 29–28)	3	5:00
Light Heavyweight	Rashad Evans	def.	Sam Hoger	Decision (split) (28–29, 30–27, 29–28)	3	5:00
Welterweight	Josh Neer	def.	Joe Stevenson	Decision (unanimous) (29–28, 29–28, 29–28)	3	5:00
Middleweight	Chris Leben	def.	Luigi Fioravanti	Decision (unanimous) (30–27, 30–27, 30–27)	3	5:00
Preliminary Card
Welterweight	Luke Cummo	def.	Jason Von Flue	Decision (unanimous) (30–27, 30–26, 30–27)	3	5:00
Welterweight	Jon Fitch	def.	Josh Burkman	Submission (rear-naked choke)	2	4:57
Heavyweight	Dan Christison	def.	Brad Imes	Submission (armbar)	3	3:37
Welterweight	Josh Koscheck	def.	Ansar Chalangov	Submission (rear-naked choke)	1	3:29
Middleweight	Chael Sonnen	def.	Trevor Prangley	Decision (unanimous) (30–27, 30–27, 30–27)	3	5:00

== Bonus awards ==
The following fighters received bonuses.

- Fight of the Night: Brad Imes vs. Dan Christison
- Submission of the Night: Dan Christison

== Encyclopedia awards ==
The following fighters were honored in the October 2011 book titled UFC Encyclopedia. Author Thomas Gerbasi's choices differed from the official bonus awards.

- Fight of the Night: Josh Neer vs. Joe Stevenson
- Submission of the Night: Josh Koscheck

== Reported payouts ==
Stephan Bonnar: $24,000

Luke Cummo: $24,000

Rashad Evans: $24,000

Josh Koscheck: $14,000

Chris Leben: $14,000

Joe Stevenson: $12,000

Josh Neer: $8,000

Jon Fitch: $8,000

Sam Hoger: $7,000

Dan Christison: $6,000

Brad Imes: $6,000

Chael Sonnen: $6,000

Trevor Prangley: $6,000

Jason Von Flue: $5,000

Luigi Fioravanti: $5,000

Keith Jardine: $5,000

Josh Burkman: $5,000

Ansar Chalangov: $2,000

Disclosed Fighter Payroll: $181,000

== See also ==
- Ultimate Fighting Championship
- List of UFC champions
- List of UFC events
- 2006 in UFC
