= Stephan Bonnar =

American mixed martial artist (1977–2022)

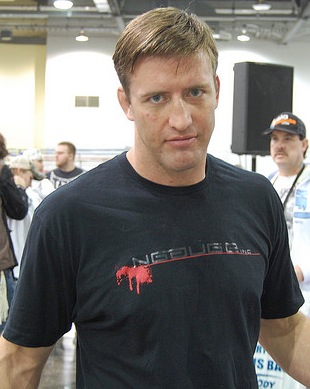
- Born: Stephan Patrick Bonnar; April 4, 1977; Hammond, Indiana, U.S.
- Died: December 22, 2022 (aged 45); Las Vegas, Nevada, U.S.
- Other names: The American Psycho
- Height: 6 ft 3 in (191 cm)
- Weight: 205 lb (93 kg; 14 st 9 lb)
- Division: Heavyweight; Light Heavyweight
- Reach: 80 in (200 cm)
- Stance: Orthodox
- Fighting out of: Las Vegas, Nevada, U.S.
- Team: Roufusport
- Teachers: Carlson Gracie, Sergio Penha
- Rank: Black belt in Brazilian Jiu-Jitsu under Sergio Penha; Black belt in Tae Kwon Do
- Years active: 2001–2012; 2014 (MMA); 2017–2022 (professional wrestling)

Mixed martial arts record
- Total: 24
- Wins: 15
- By knockout: 3
- By submission: 7
- By decision: 5
- Losses: 9
- By knockout: 3
- By decision: 6

Other information
- University: Purdue University
- Mixed martial arts record from Sherdog

Stephan Patrick Bonnar (April 4, 1977 – December 22, 2022) was an American mixed martial artist and professional wrestler. Bonnar competed as a Light Heavyweight in the UFC for most of his career. Bonnar was the runner-up on The Ultimate Fighter 1; his TUF Ultimate Finale loss to Forrest Griffin is widely considered to be the most important fight in the history of the UFC.

== Early life and education ==
Bonnar was born in Hammond, Indiana, and raised in Munster, Indiana, attending Munster High School. Bonnar had an extensive background in combat sports, beginning with Wrestling when he was 10 years old, Taekwondo at age 12, Brazilian Jiu-Jitsu at age 22, and then added Boxing and Muay Thai when he was 24 years old. He earned his black belt in Taekwondo at the age of 16 and was a two-time Golden Gloves Champion in the super heavyweight division. He attended and graduated from Purdue University in 2000, where he competed in wrestling, and earned a degree in sports medicine.

== Early career ==
Bonnar began training Brazilian jiu-jitsu with Carlson Gracie during the summer of 1999, under whom he received his purple belt. Bonnar also trained in Muay Thai during several trips to Thailand. Since the beginning of 2010 Bonnar trained in Muay Thai in Las Vegas under Master One Kick Nick Blomgren at One Kick's Gym.

== Mixed martial arts career ==
=== Ultimate Fighting Championship ===
Due to his strong performance in the Light Heavyweight finals, where he lost a unanimous decision to Forrest Griffin in a back and forth fight, Bonnar was awarded a six-figure UFC contract along with Griffin. After his loss to Griffin, Bonnar became the staple of the regular UFC Ultimate Fight Night shows at the Hard Rock Hotel and Casino in Las Vegas, defeating such notables as Sam Hoger, James Irvin and Keith Jardine before succumbing to Rashad Evans by majority decision. In 2006 Bonnar lost a unanimous decision against Forrest Griffin in the long-anticipated rematch at UFC 62. After UFC 62, Bonnar tested positive for the banned substance Boldenone, a type of anabolic steroid. The commission issued a nine-month suspension on Bonnar's fighter's license and fined him $5,000.

Bonnar in 2007.

Bonnar was forced to withdraw from his fight against Matt Hamill at UFC Fight Night 13 due to a serious knee injury he suffered during training. He returned to action at UFC 94 against Jon Jones, which resulted in a loss via decision. In his next fight at UFC 100 Bonnar lost a unanimous decision to Mark Coleman.

Bonnar mentioned on the MMA Live Post Fight Show for UFC 101 that he was considering a drop down to Middleweight after two disappointing losses at Light Heavyweight. Despite this, Bonnar next faced Krzysztof Soszynski on February 21, 2010, at UFC 110. Soszynski was victorious at 1:04 in the third round, due to TKO (Cut). Video replays that showed that the cut was opened up by a clash of heads, and Bonnar appealed referee John Sharp's decision. It was announced on March 10 that he had lost the appeal and the result would stand as a TKO win for Soszynski.

At UFC 116, Bonnar won the rematch with a second-round TKO against Soszynski after catching him with a knee. The win broke Bonnar's three fight losing streak, bringing his UFC record to 6-6. The fight earned Bonnar and Soszynski Fight of the Night honors alongside Yoshihiro Akiyama and Chris Leben's fight.

Bonnar fought Igor Pokrajac on December 4, 2010, at The Ultimate Fighter 12 Finale. He won the bout via unanimous decision (29–26, 29–26, and 29–26).

Bonnar was expected to face Karlos Vemola on August 14, 2011, at UFC on Versus 5. However, Bonnar was forced to withdraw from the bout due to an injury and was replaced by Ronny Markes.

Bonnar faced Kyle Kingsbury on November 19, 2011, at UFC 139. Bonnar defeated Kingsbury by unanimous decision (30–27, 30–25, and 30–27).

With the UFC needing to replace the main event at UFC 153, they turned to Bonnar and Anderson Silva to fill the spot left empty by injuries. The two UFC vets squared off in a Light Heavyweight match October 13, 2012, in Rio de Janeiro, Brazil. Silva won the fight via TKO. Bonnar tested positive for anabolic steroids after the fight (Drostanolone). After his loss to Silva it was announced on October 30, 2012, by UFC president Dana White that Bonnar had retired from MMA competition.

=== UFC Hall of Fame ===
Shortly after the announcement of Forrest Griffin's retirement, Dana White announced that Bonnar and Griffin would be inducted into the UFC Hall of Fame. Bonnar and Griffin were officially inducted on July 6, 2013.

=== Bellator MMA ===
On August 27, 2014, Bellator announced they had signed Bonnar to a multi-fight deal, seemingly coming out of retirement. Bonnar faced Tito Ortiz on November 15, 2014, at Bellator 131 and lost via split decision. Thereafter, Bonnar retired for a second time.

== Professional wrestling career ==
=== Independent circuit (2017–2021) ===
On April 8, 2017, Stephan made his pro wrestling debut at Smashmouth Pro Wrestling's event Smashfest in a Battle Royal. On August 1, 2017, House of Glory, a New York City independent wrestling company announced that Bonnar would be stepping into a wrestling ring for the first time ever to face another former UFC fighter and current pro wrestler, Matt Riddle. However, Riddle backed out and he faced Sho Tanaka from NJPW instead. On December 2, 2017, "Speedball" Mike Bailey defeated Bonnar at IWS Season's Beatings in Montreal.

=== Impact Wrestling (2017, 2019) ===
Bonnar made his Impact Wrestling debut on November 5, 2017, teaming with Moose losing to King Mo and Bobby Lashley at Bound for Glory (2017) in Ottawa, Canada.

On September 14, 2019, Bonnar faced Moose in a losing effort at Impact Wrestling's Victory Road 2019.

During the Impact Wrestling October tapings from Las Vegas, Bonnar faced Moose in a repeat of their contest from Victory Road. The rematch was used as part of Moose's buildup towards a match against Ken Shamrock at Bound for Glory later that month. The commentators said that Bonnar had been chosen as he was from a similar background and is a similar type of wrestler to Shamrock, therefore viewed as an ideal warmup for Moose. However, Shamrock then made an unexpected appearance after Moose disqualifies himself from the match by attacking the referee, Shamrock then put Moose in his signature ankle lock.

== Personal life ==
Bonnar and his longtime girlfriend were married on October 30, 2009, in Tuscany, Italy. The couple have one son, Griffin Brandon, named after Forrest Griffin and in memory of Andrea's late brother, Brandon Brown.

He was asthmatic.

Bonnar was a fan of the rock band The Who and used their song "Eminence Front" as his entrance music to his UFC fights. Outside of competition, Bonnar has done commentary work for televised mixed martial arts programming, notably serving as the WEC's color commentator for most of 2010, calling 5 of their final 7 cards. He has also made appearances as an analyst on the ESPN2 series MMA Live and for UFC broadcasts on the Fox television networks.

After retiring from the mixed martial arts, Bonnar was appointed the president of North Star Combat, a Minnesota-based MMA promotion.

== Legal issues ==
On October 28, 2018, Bonnar was arrested in Nevada and charged with DUI. At approximately 1:15 p.m., the Nevada highway patrol received multiple reports that there was a red Cadillac, a vehicle owned and being driven by Bonnar, observed driving recklessly and making unsafe lane changes. When the NHP arrived on scene, they witnessed Bonnar had both hands tied and strung up to each side of his inside car handles. The pedestrians on scene said he attempted to flee the scene of the accident, so they were forced to "hog tie" him to the inside of his wrecked vehicle. This entire exchange was recorded via the responding officer's body cam and aired on the television shows season 4 of PD Cam. Officers also claimed that they could smell alcohol on Bonnar's breath and inside of Bonnar's vehicle. Bonnar was arrested on scene, refused to comply or respond to officers commands, and had to be carried and laid inside the back of the patrol car. He was then taken to the Clark County detention center where he was charged with DUI and resisting arrest.

== Death ==
Bonnar died in Las Vegas on December 22, 2022, at the age of 45. UFC issued a statement suggesting it was presumed that Bonnar had died of a heart complication while at work. It was later revealed by the Clark County coroner's office that Bonnar had died from an accidental fentanyl overdose.

== Championships and accomplishments ==
=== Mixed martial arts ===
- Ultimate Fighting Championship
  - UFC Hall of Fame (Fight Wing, Class of 2013) vs. Forrest Griffin 1 at The Ultimate Fighter 1 Finale
  - The Ultimate Fighter 1 (Runner-up)
  - Fight of the Night (One time) vs. Krzysztof Soszynski on July 3, 2010
  - UFC Encyclopedia Awards
    - Fight of the Night (One time) vs. Forrest Griffin 1
  - UFC.com Awards
    - 2005: Fight of the Year vs. Forrest Griffin 1
    - 2010: Ranked #3 Fight of the Year vs. Krzysztof Soszynski
- Heavy Sports
  - 2000s Fight of the Decade vs. Forrest Griffin at The Ultimate Fighter 1 Finale
- Wrestling Observer Newsletter
  - Fight of the Year (2005) vs. Forrest Griffin 1 on April 9

=== Professional wrestling ===
- World Class Revolution
  - WCR Heavyweight Championship (1 time)

== Mixed martial arts record ==
Professional record breakdown
24 matches	15 wins	9 losses
By knockout	3	3
By submission	7	0
By decision	5	6

Res.	Record	Opponent	Method	Event	Date	Round	Time	Location	Notes
Loss	15–9	Tito Ortiz	Decision (split)	Bellator 131	November 15, 2014	3	5:00	San Diego, California, United States	
Loss	15–8	Anderson Silva	TKO (knees to the body and punches)	UFC 153	October 13, 2012	1	4:40	Rio de Janeiro, Brazil	Post-fight announced MMA retirement. Bonnar tested positive for Drostanolone.
Win	15–7	Kyle Kingsbury	Decision (unanimous)	UFC 139	November 19, 2011	3	5:00	San Jose, California, United States	
Win	14–7	Igor Pokrajac	Decision (unanimous)	The Ultimate Fighter 12 Finale	December 4, 2010	3	5:00	Las Vegas, Nevada, United States	Pokrajac had 1 point deducted at the end of round 2 for two knee strikes on a downed opponent. Bonnar had 1 point deducted at the end of round 3 for strikes to the back of the head.
Win	13–7	Krzysztof Soszynski	TKO (punches)	UFC 116	July 3, 2010	2	3:08	Las Vegas, Nevada, United States	Fight of the Night.
Loss	12–7	Krzysztof Soszynski	TKO (doctor stoppage)	UFC 110	February 21, 2010	3	1:04	Sydney, Australia	Bonnar's cut was a result of an inadvertent headbutt.
Loss	12–6	Mark Coleman	Decision (unanimous)	UFC 100	July 11, 2009	3	5:00	Las Vegas, Nevada, United States	
Loss	12–5	Jon Jones	Decision (unanimous)	UFC 94	January 31, 2009	3	5:00	Las Vegas, Nevada, United States	
Win	12–4	Eric Schafer	TKO (punches)	UFC 77	October 20, 2007	2	2:47	Cincinnati, Ohio, United States	
Win	11–4	Mike Nickels	Submission (rear-naked choke)	UFC 73	July 7, 2007	1	2:14	Sacramento, California, United States	
Loss	10–4	Forrest Griffin	Decision (unanimous)	UFC 62	August 26, 2006	3	5:00	Las Vegas, Nevada, United States	Bonnar tested positive for boldenone after the fight.
Loss	10–3	Rashad Evans	Decision (majority)	UFC Fight Night 5	June 28, 2006	3	5:00	Las Vegas, Nevada, United States	
Win	10–2	Keith Jardine	Decision (unanimous)	UFC Fight Night 4	April 6, 2006	3	5:00	Las Vegas, Nevada, United States	
Win	9–2	James Irvin	Submission (kimura)	UFC Fight Night 3	January 16, 2006	1	4:30	Las Vegas, Nevada, United States	
Win	8–2	Sam Hoger	Decision (unanimous)	UFC Ultimate Fight Night	August 6, 2005	3	5:00	Las Vegas, Nevada, United States	
Loss	7–2	Forrest Griffin	Decision (unanimous)	The Ultimate Fighter 1 Finale	April 9, 2005	3	5:00	Las Vegas, Nevada, United States	The Ultimate Fighter Season 1 Light Heavyweight tournament final. Fight of the Year (2005).
Win	7–1	Sean Sallee	Submission (triangle choke)	IHC 7-The Crucible	June 5, 2004	1	2:28	Hammond, Indiana, United States	
Win	6–1	William Hill	TKO (punches)	Total Fight Challenge 1	April 24, 2004	1	N/A	Hammond, Indiana, United States	
Win	5–1	Brad Lynde	Submission (rear-naked choke)	IHC 6: Inferno	November 22, 2003	1	4:10	Hammond, Indiana, United States	
Loss	4–1	Lyoto Machida	TKO (doctor stoppage)	Jungle Fight 1	September 13, 2003	1	4:21	Manaus, Brazil	
Win	4–0	Terry Martin	Decision (unanimous)	Maximum Fighting Challenge	September 7, 2002	1	10:00	Hammond, Indiana, United States	
Win	3–0	Jay Massey	Submission (guillotine choke)	UA 1: The Genesis	January 27, 2002	1	1:09	Hammond, Indiana, United States	
Win	2–0	Josh Kruger	Submission (armbar)	IHC 3: Exodus	November 10, 2001	1	2:55	Hammond, Indiana, United States	
Win	1–0	Brian Ebersole	Submission (guillotine choke)	IHC 3: Exodus	November 10, 2001	1	0:51	Hammond, Indiana, United States	

== Mixed martial arts exhibition record ==
Exhibition record breakdown		
2 matches	2 wins	0 losses
By submission	1	0
By decision	1	0

Res.	Record	Opponent	Method	Event	Date	Round	Time	Location	Notes
Win	2–0	Mike Swick	Submission (armbar)	The Ultimate Fighter 1	April 4, 2005 (airdate)	1	4:58	Las Vegas, Nevada	The Ultimate Fighter 1 Semi-final round.
Win	1–0	Bobby Southworth	Decision (split)	The Ultimate Fighter 1	February 28, 2005 (airdate)	2	5:00	Las Vegas, Nevada	The Ultimate Fighter 1 Elimination bout.

== See also ==
- List of Bellator MMA alumni
- The Ultimate Fighter
