= UFC 92 =

UFC mixed martial arts event in 2008

UFC 92: The Ultimate 2008
- The poster for UFC 92: The Ultimate 2008
- Promotion: Ultimate Fighting Championship
- Date: December 27, 2008
- Venue: MGM Grand Garden Arena
- City: Las Vegas, Nevada
- Attendance: 14,103 (9,701 paid)
- Total gate: $3,468,440
- Buyrate: 1,050,000

Event chronology
The Ultimate Fighter: Team Nogueira vs. Team Mir Finale	UFC 92: The Ultimate 2008	UFC 93: Franklin vs. Henderson

UFC 92: The Ultimate 2008 was a mixed martial arts (MMA) pay-per-view event held by the Ultimate Fighting Championship (UFC) on December 27, 2008, at the MGM Grand Garden Arena in Las Vegas, Nevada.

== Background ==
The main event featured UFC Light Heavyweight Champion Forrest Griffin, against undefeated challenger Rashad Evans. This was the first time that two winners of The Ultimate Fighter competed in a title fight against each other.

The first co-main event saw former UFC Heavyweight Champion Frank Mir against former Pride Heavyweight Champion and Interim UFC Heavyweight Champion Antônio Rodrigo Nogueira.

The other co-main event was a rubber match between former UFC Light Heavyweight Champion Quinton Jackson and former PRIDE Middleweight champion Wanderlei Silva. Silva had won their previous two matches in the PRIDE organization in Japan.

Antoni Hardonk was originally scheduled to face Mark Burch, who was injured and replaced by Mike Wessel.

== Results ==
Main card (PPV)
Weight class				Method	Round	Time	Notes
Light Heavyweight	Rashad Evans	def.	Forrest Griffin (c)	KO (punches)	3	2:46	(Note: For the UFC Light Heavyweight Championship. Both winners of The Ultimate Fighter competed in a title fight against each other.)
Heavyweight	Frank Mir	def.	Antônio Rodrigo Nogueira (ic)	TKO (punches)	2	1:54	(Note: For the interim UFC Heavyweight Championship.)
Middleweight	C. B. Dollaway	def.	Mike Massenzio	TKO (punches)	1	3:01
Light Heavyweight	Quinton Jackson	def.	Wanderlei Silva	KO (punch)	1	3:21
Heavyweight	Cheick Kongo	def.	Mostapha al-Turk	TKO (punches)	1	4:37
Preliminary card
Middleweight	Yushin Okami	def.	Dean Lister	Decision (unanimous) (30–27, 30–27, 30–27)	3	5:00
Heavyweight	Antoni Hardonk	def.	Mike Wessel	TKO (punches)	2	2:09
Light Heavyweight	Matt Hamill	def.	Reese Andy	TKO (punches)	2	2:19
Welterweight	Brad Blackburn	def.	Ryo Chonan	Decision (unanimous) (29–28, 29–28, 29–28)	3	5:00
Heavyweight	Pat Barry	def.	Dan Evensen	TKO (leg kicks)	1	2:36

== Bonus awards ==
The following fighters received $60,000 bonuses.

- Fight of the Night: Rashad Evans vs. Forrest Griffin
- Knockout of the Night: Quinton Jackson
- Submission of the Night: No bonus awarded.

== Reported payout ==
- Rashad Evans: $130,000 (includes $65,000 win bonus)

def. Forrest Griffin: $100,000

- Frank Mir: $90,000 (includes $45,000 win bonus)

def. Antônio Rodrigo Nogueira: $250,000

- Quinton Jackson: $325,000 (includes $100,000 win bonus)

def. Wanderlei Silva: $200,000

- C.B. Dollaway: $20,000 (includes $10,000 win bonus)

def. Mike Massenzio: $5,000

- Cheick Kongo: $90,000 (includes $45,000 win bonus)

def: Mostapha al-Turk: $7,000

- Yushin Okami: $32,000 (includes $16,000 win bonus)

def. Dean Lister: $19,000

- Antoni Hardonk: $28,000 (includes $14,000 win bonus)

def. Mike Wessel: $4,000

- Matt Hamill: $20,000 (includes $10,000 win bonus)

def. Reese Andy: $15,000

- Brad Blackburn: $14,000 (includes $7,000 win bonus)

vs. Ryo Chonan: $18,000

- Pat Barry: $10,000 (includes $5,000 win bonus)

Dan Evensen: $4,000

== See also ==
- Ultimate Fighting Championship
- List of UFC champions
- List of UFC events
- 2008 in UFC
