= MMA Live =

Television series

- Genre: Mixed martial arts
- Country of origin: United States
- Original language: English
- No. of seasons: 2

Original release
- Network: ESPN
- Release: May 6, 2010 – 2011

MMA Live was a sports show about mixed martial arts. It was seen on ESPN2. The show featured analysts such as Franklin McNeil, Pat Miletich, and others. MMA Live was originally an Internet show, but made the move to television after positive reception. The show was also seen in the UK, Republic of Ireland, Australia and New Zealand on ESPN. Since 2011, there have been no new episodes of the MMA Live show produced. However, individual video clips featuring MMA news branded as MMA Live are regularly updated on ESPN's web site.

Other occasional hosts of the show included, Chael Sonnen, Brian Stann, Miguel Torres, Stephan Bonnar and Muhammed Lawal. MMA For Dummies was a segment on MMA Live, which featured mixed martial arts-fighting techniques. Each segment demonstrated a single technique in a basic and straightforward manner, performed by a notable mixed martial arts fighter.

== Hosts, analysts and other contributors ==
- Jon Anik (Host, 2010–2011)
- Todd Grisham (Host, 2011)
- Jonathan Coachman (Guest Host, 2011)
- Kenny Florian (Analyst, 2010–2011)
- Franklin McNeil (Analyst, 2010–2011)
- Rashad Evans (Analyst, 2010–2011)
- Miguel Torres (Analyst, 2010–2011)
- Gilbert Melendez (Analyst, 2010–2011)
- Muhammed Lawal (Analyst, 2010–2011)
- Stephan Bonnar (Analyst, 2010–2011)
- Chael Sonnen (Analyst, 2010–2011)
- Josh Gross (Insider, 2010–2011)
- Brett Okamoto (Insider, 2010–2011)
- Molly Qerim (Correspondent, 2010–2011)
- Gareth A. Davies (International Correspondent (2010–2011)
- Chuck Mindenhall (Analyst, 2010–2011)

== See also ==
- Inside MMA
