= Forrest Griffin =

American mixed martial artist (born 1979)

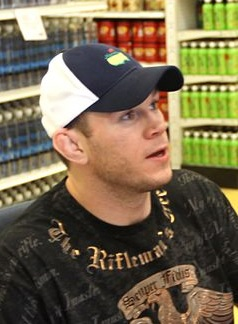
- Griffin in 2010
- Born: July 1, 1979 (age 47); Columbus, Ohio, U.S.
- Height: 6 ft 3 in (191 cm)
- Weight: 205 lb (93 kg; 14 st 9 lb)
- Division: Heavyweight (2001–2003); Light Heavyweight (2003–2012)
- Reach: 77 in (196 cm)
- Stance: Orthodox
- Fighting out of: Las Vegas, Nevada, U.S.
- Team: Throwdown Training Center; Xtreme Couture
- Rank: Black belt in Brazilian Jiu-Jitsu under Robert Drysdale
- Years active: 2001–2012

Mixed martial arts record
- Total: 26
- Wins: 19
- By knockout: 4
- By submission: 6
- By decision: 9
- Losses: 7
- By knockout: 5
- By decision: 2

Other information
- University: University of Georgia
- Mixed martial arts record from Sherdog

Forrest Griffin (born July 1, 1979) is an American retired mixed martial artist. He is a former UFC Light Heavyweight Champion and was inducted into the UFC Hall of Fame in 2013. He is now the Vice President of Athlete Development at the UFC Performance Institute. A former Georgia police officer, Griffin first rose to prominence after winning the first season of The Ultimate Fighter. In the tournament finals, he defeated Stephan Bonnar in a fight which is widely credited as sparking the success of the UFC.

== Early life ==
Griffin, who is of Irish descent, graduated from Evans High School in Evans, Georgia, a suburb of Augusta, where he played football. He then attended the University of Georgia, graduating with a Bachelor of Arts in political science. Thereafter, Griffin served as a law enforcement officer for the Richmond County Sheriff's Office in Augusta, Georgia. He also served as a patrol officer with the University of Georgia police.

He trained at The HardCore Gym (now SBG Athens) in Athens for seven years under Adam and Rory Singer. He later left law enforcement to pursue a career in professional mixed martial arts. Griffin is also an MMA instructor at Throwdown Training Center and Robert Drysdale Brazilian jiu-jitsu in Las Vegas, Nevada.

== Professional mixed martial arts career ==
=== Early career ===
Before The Ultimate Fighter, he fought the likes of Jeff Monson, Jeremy Horn, Chael Sonnen and early UFC veteran Dan Severn in his first pro fight. Forrest Griffin is also known for a fight with Edson Paradeo, in which Edson broke Griffin's left arm with what appeared to be a badly blocked roundhouse kick aimed at the body. Forrest continued on to win the fight by knockout. As a result of the badly blocked body kick, he has a huge permanent lump on his left forearm.

=== The Ultimate Fighter ===
Griffin first became well known by taking part in the first-season of Spike TV's The Ultimate Fighter, a mixed martial arts reality show. At the time, he had given up mixed martial arts and taken a job with the Augusta/Richmond County Sheriff's Department in Georgia, but he was persuaded by Dana White to take part in the show.

==== Griffin vs. Bonnar ====
On the show, he reached the finals where he defeated Stephan Bonnar by unanimous decision. The fight was credited by Dana White as the "most important fight in UFC history" and the fight that brought the UFC into the mainstream. For winning the competition he was given a six-figure professional contract to fight with the UFC. The Stephan Bonnar fight was declared the #1 UFC fight of all time in the UFC Ultimate 100 Greatest Fights program.

=== Rise to fame ===
==== Griffin vs. Ortiz ====
On April 15, 2006, Griffin fought former light heavyweight champion Tito Ortiz at UFC 59, in which he lost a controversial split decision. This fight earned him his first Fight of the Night award.

==== Griffin vs. Bonnar II ====
At UFC 62, Griffin then fought Stephan Bonnar in a rematch from their earlier fight. Griffin won by unanimous decision, sweeping all three rounds.

==== Griffin vs. Jardine ====
Griffin was defeated by Ultimate Fighter 2 semifinalist Keith Jardine at UFC 66 by TKO at 4:41 of the first round. After the fight, Griffin sat in his corner crying. Moments later, he walked away from Joe Rogan's attempt to interview him, saying "I don't ev...Keith came in and he did exactly what I wanted to do and he knocked me the fuck out. Let's go home."

==== Staph infection ====
Griffin was scheduled to fight at UFC 70 against Lyoto Machida on April 21, 2007, but he was unable to fight due to a staph infection.

==== Griffin vs. Ramirez ====
On June 16, 2007, Griffin defeated Hector Ramirez at UFC 72 in Belfast, Northern Ireland via unanimous decision with all three judges scoring the fight 30–27 to Griffin. During the fight, Forrest was able to land 38 leg kicks breaking the UFC record for most leg kicks landed in three five-minute rounds. This record has since been broken by Amir Sadollah, who landed 46 against Peter Sobotta at UFC 122.

==== Griffin vs. Shogun ====
At UFC 76, Griffin fought against PRIDE Middleweight Grand Prix Champion Maurício Rua. At the time, Shogun was ranked the number one light heavyweight fighter in the world by several MMA publications. Griffin won by rear naked choke at 4:45 of round three. Griffin required surgery after the fight due to a shoulder injury that was sustained before the bout. Griffin's shoulder has been a recurring problem since. This fight earned him a $40,000 Submission of the Night award.

=== Coaching The Ultimate Fighter 7 ===
On The Ultimate Fighter 6 finale, Dana White announced that Griffin was not only the number one contender for the Light Heavyweight title, but also one of the coaches for The Ultimate Fighter 7 and would fight the other coach at the end of the series. The other coach, Quinton "Rampage" Jackson was announced by Dana White on December 9 at Spike TV's Video Game Awards show.

On June 20, 2008, Griffin co-hosted the 25 Tuffest Moments in The Ultimate Fighter with Stephan Bonnar and Dana White.

=== Winning and losing the UFC Light Heavyweight Championship and rematches ===
==== Griffin vs. Jackson ====
On July 5, 2008 at UFC 86, Griffin fought the UFC Light Heavyweight Champion, Quinton "Rampage" Jackson. Viewed as a heavy underdog by many going into the fight, Griffin faced Jackson in a hard-fought battle that earned him a $60,000 Fight of the Night award. Griffin won a unanimous decision victory and became the new undisputed UFC Light Heavyweight Champion.

Griffin appeared to be in trouble in the first round after being dropped by an uppercut, but he rallied in the second round and landed a damaging leg kick early that severely wobbled Jackson. Griffin followed up with ground strikes and cemented his control, preventing Jackson from mounting any significant offense for the entire round. After three more back and forth rounds, Griffin would go on to win the fight by unanimous decision to capture the light heavyweight title.

The decision was described as controversial by some commentators. After the fight, Jackson's trainer Juanito Ibarra, unhappy with the judges scoring, expressed plans to protest the unanimous decision with the Nevada State Athletic Commission but never filed as it would not have changed the decision.

Griffin's documented pay for the fight was $310,000. $100,000 to fight, win bonus of $150,000 and $60,000 for the Fight of the Night award.

==== Griffin vs. Evans ====
Griffin's first title defense came at UFC 92: The Ultimate 2008, against undefeated challenger Rashad Evans. After Griffin controlled most of the first two rounds with effective striking, Evans caught one of Griffin's kicks and took him down, defeating Griffin by TKO in the third round with ground and pound from inside the champion's guard. The loss was Griffin's third loss since entering the UFC. During the fight Griffin broke his hand, sidelining him for several months. This fight earned him another $60,000 Fight of the Night award.

==== Griffin vs. Silva ====
After recovery, Griffin signed on to fight pound-for-pound stalwart Anderson Silva at UFC 101. Griffin was slated to take on Brazilian Anderson Silva, but on April 28, 2009, UFC President Dana White confirmed that he would instead accommodate Anderson's return to the light heavyweight division following his middleweight title defense against Thales Leites at UFC 97. During the bout, Griffin was knocked down three times in the first round by Silva. Before the third knockdown, Griffin charged Silva with a flurry of punches, all of which were avoided by sways from Silva, who then countered with a compact right hand whilst retreating, knocking Griffin out.

After the fight, Griffin got up from the canvas, left the cage, and jogged out of the arena. It was initially suggested that Griffin was rushed to a hospital due to a dislocated jaw and trouble hearing in one ear. However, it turned out there was no injury to Griffin's jaw. Both fighters were awarded $60,000 as Fight of the Night bonuses and Silva received an additional $60,000 in bonus money for Knockout of the Night.

==== Griffin vs. Ortiz II ====
When Mark Coleman got injured and had to drop out of his matchup against Tito Ortiz, Griffin accepted a rematch against Ortiz at UFC 106. Griffin also wore white and black fight shorts instead of his trademark tan shorts for the fight. Griffin went on to win the gory battle by split decision, showing superior striking skills and a stronger ground game than in their previous fight. After the fight Griffin said, "Tito was a great fight for me to come back, we'll have to do a third that's 1–1 man." With a split decision in both of their fights, Griffin seemed more than willing to get a rubber match put together with Ortiz to settle the score once and for all. "You could tell he was a guy getting ready for Mark Coleman, no offense, and he's a guy coming off back surgery. We'll do it again, I won't break my foot, he'll be in better shape," commented Griffin.

==== Shoulder injury ====
Griffin was expected to face Antônio Rogério Nogueira on May 29, 2010, at UFC 114, but Griffin pulled out of the fight due to a shoulder injury. He was replaced by Jason Brilz.

==== Griffin vs. Franklin ====
Griffin faced former UFC Middleweight Champion Rich Franklin on February 5, 2011, at UFC 126. Griffin controlled the majority of the fight: in the first round he took Franklin down and controlled him on the ground and in the second he used superior kicks and combinations to knock Franklin down. Griffin went on to win by unanimous decision.

==== Griffin vs. Shogun II ====
A rematch with Maurício Rua took place on August 27, 2011, at UFC 134. Griffin lost the bout via KO (punches) in the first round and would be out up to 6 months with possible right-foot and jaw injuries. Before the fight, Griffin was updated that his wife had gone into labor. Dana White also voiced his support for Griffin, stating that he was very proud of him regardless of the loss.

==== Griffin vs. Ortiz III ====
Griffin faced Tito Ortiz for a third time on July 7, 2012, at UFC 148. He won the fight via a 29–28 unanimous decision out-striking Ortiz 2:1 despite being knocked down by Ortiz as well as being taken down twice. The fight also won Fight of the Night earning both Griffin and Ortiz a $75,000 fight bonus.

This fight marked the third time in his career that he left the Octagon on unusual terms, simply walking out before the fight results were read. He later went back to the ring and gave Tito Ortiz an unexpected interview.

==== MCL & ACL injury ====
Griffin was expected to fight Chael Sonnen in a rematch on December 29, 2012, at UFC 155. Instead Sonnen was pulled out of the fight to coach TUF season 17. Griffin was then expected to face Phil Davis at the event. However, on December 5 it was announced that Forrest was forced out of the bout due to an MCL tear and ACL strain.

Griffin hoped to return from injury by the end of 2013.

==== Retirement and UFC Hall of Fame ====
On May 26, 2013, it was announced at the post-event news conference for UFC 160 that Griffin had retired from MMA fighting, citing chronic injuries as the reason for his decision. After the announcement of Griffin's retirement, Dana White announced that Griffin and Stephan Bonnar would be inducted into the UFC Hall of Fame on July 6. Griffin has remained in the sport, and is currently working as the vice president of athlete development at the UFC Performance Institute.

== Personal life ==
Griffin and his longtime girlfriend Jaime Logiudice were married on September 18, 2009. The couple welcomed their first child, a daughter, in September 2011. Forrest's wife was going into labor (nine days early) as he competed against Maurício "Shogun" Rua at UFC 134 on August 27, 2011.

== Championships and accomplishments ==
=== Mixed martial arts ===
- Ultimate Fighting Championship
  - UFC Hall of Fame (Modern Wing, Class of 2013) and (Fight Wing, Class of 2013) vs. Stephan Bonnar at The Ultimate Fighter 1 Finale
  - UFC Light Heavyweight Championship (One time)
  - The Ultimate Fighter: Light Heavyweight Tournament Winner
  - Fight of the Night (Five times) vs. Tito Ortiz 1 & 3, Quinton Jackson, Rashad Evans, and Anderson Silva
  - Submission of the Night (One time) vs. Maurício Rua 1
  - UFC Encyclopedia Awards
    - Fight of the Night (Two times) vs. Stephan Bonnar 1 and Elvis Sinosic
  - UFC.com Awards
    - 2005: Fight of the Year vs. Stephan Bonnar 1
    - 2006: Ranked #5 Fight of the Year vs. Tito Ortiz 1
    - 2007: Submission of the Year vs. Mauricio Rua 1, Ranked #2 Upset of the Year vs. Maurício Rua 1 & Ranked #6 Fighter of the Year
    - 2008: Fight of the Year & Ranked #5 Upset of the Year vs. Quinton Jackson
- Heavy Sports
  - 2000s Fight of the Decade vs. Stephan Bonnar at The Ultimate Fighter 1 Finale
- Wrestling Observer Newsletter
  - 2005 Fight of the Year vs. Stephan Bonnar 1 on April 9
  - 2008 Fight of the Year vs. Quinton Jackson on July 5
- Fighting Spirit Magazine
  - 2006 Fight of the Year vs. Tito Ortiz on April 15
- Triumph United
  - 2007 Upset of the Year vs. Maurício Rua on September 22
- Southern Nevada Sports Hall of Fame
  - Class of 2018
- International Sports Hall of Fame
  - Class of 2020

== Mixed martial arts record ==
Professional record breakdown
26 matches	19 wins	7 losses
By knockout	4	5
By submission	6	0
By decision	9	2

Res.	Record	Opponent	Method	Event	Date	Round	Time	Location	Notes
Win	19–7	Tito Ortiz	Decision (unanimous)	UFC 148	July 7, 2012	3	5:00	Las Vegas, Nevada, United States	Fight of the Night.
Loss	18–7	Maurício Rua	KO (punches)	UFC 134	August 27, 2011	1	1:53	Rio de Janeiro, Brazil	
Win	18–6	Rich Franklin	Decision (unanimous)	UFC 126	February 5, 2011	3	5:00	Las Vegas, Nevada, United States	
Win	17–6	Tito Ortiz	Decision (split)	UFC 106	November 21, 2009	3	5:00	Las Vegas, Nevada, United States	
Loss	16–6	Anderson Silva	KO (punch)	UFC 101	August 8, 2009	1	3:23	Philadelphia, Pennsylvania, United States	Fight of the Night.
Loss	16–5	Rashad Evans	TKO (punches)	UFC 92	December 27, 2008	3	2:46	Las Vegas, Nevada, United States	Lost the UFC Light Heavyweight Championship. Fight of the Night.
Win	16–4	Quinton Jackson	Decision (unanimous)	UFC 86	July 5, 2008	5	5:00	Las Vegas, Nevada, United States	Won the UFC Light Heavyweight Championship. Fight of the Night.
Win	15–4	Maurício Rua	Submission (rear-naked choke)	UFC 76	September 22, 2007	3	4:45	Anaheim, California, United States	Submission of the Night.
Win	14–4	Hector Ramirez	Decision (unanimous)	UFC 72	June 16, 2007	3	5:00	Belfast, Northern Ireland, United Kingdom	
Loss	13–4	Keith Jardine	TKO (punches)	UFC 66	December 30, 2006	1	4:41	Las Vegas, Nevada, United States	
Win	13–3	Stephan Bonnar	Decision (unanimous)	UFC 62	August 26, 2006	3	5:00	Las Vegas, Nevada, United States	
Loss	12–3	Tito Ortiz	Decision (split)	UFC 59	April 15, 2006	3	5:00	Anaheim, California, United States	Fight of the Night.
Win	12–2	Elvis Sinosic	TKO (punches)	UFC 55	October 7, 2005	1	3:22	Uncasville, Connecticut, United States	
Win	11–2	Bill Mahood	Submission (rear-naked choke)	UFC 53	June 4, 2005	1	2:18	Atlantic City, New Jersey, United States	
Win	10–2	Stephan Bonnar	Decision (unanimous)	The Ultimate Fighter 1 Finale	April 9, 2005	3	5:00	Las Vegas, Nevada, United States	Won The Ultimate Fighter 1 Light Heavyweight Tournament. Fight of the Night.
Win	9–2	Edson Paredao	KO (punch)	Heat FC 2	December 18, 2003	1	1:04	Natal, Rio Grande do Norte, Brazil	Heavyweight bout.
Loss	8–2	Jeremy Horn	KO (head kick)	International FC: Global Domination	September 6, 2003	2	3:40	Denver, Colorado, United States	
Win	8–1	Chael Sonnen	Submission (triangle choke)	International FC: Global Domination	September 6, 2003	1	2:25	Denver, Colorado, United States	Light Heavyweight debut.
Win	7–1	Ebenezer Fontes Braga	Submission (rear-naked choke)	Heat FC 1	July 31, 2003	1	N/A	Natal, Rio Grande do Norte, Brazil	
Win	6–1	Steve Sayegh	TKO (submission to punches)	KOTC: Crossroads	December 15, 2002	1	1:45	Bernalillo, New Mexico, United States	
Win	5–1	Travis Fulton	TKO (doctor stoppage)	Cagefighter 1	October 26, 2002	1	5:00	Atlanta, Georgia, United States	
Win	4–1	Jeff Monson	Decision (unanimous)	World Extreme FC 1	June 29, 2002	4	4:00	Marietta, Georgia, United States	
Win	3–1	Kent Hensley	Submission (triangle choke)	International Sport Combat Federation: Battle at the Brewery	April 12, 2002	1	2:26	Atlanta, Georgia United States	
Win	2–1	Jason Braswell	Decision (split)	Reality Super Fighting 7	January 26, 2002	3	4:00	Lakeland, Florida, United States	
Win	1–1	Wiehan Lesh	Submission (rear-naked choke)	Pride and Honor 1	November 24, 2001	1	N/A	South Africa	
Loss	0–1	Dan Severn	Decision (unanimous)	Reality Super Fighting 5	October 27, 2001	3	4:00	Augusta, Georgia, United States	Heavyweight debut. For the RSF Heavyweight Championship.

== Mixed martial arts exhibition record ==
Exhibition record breakdown		
2 matches	2 wins	0 losses
By knockout	1	0
By submission	1	0

Res.	Record	Opponent	Method	Event	Date	Round	Time	Location	Notes
Win	2–0	Sam Hoger	TKO (strikes)	The Ultimate Fighter 1	April 4, 2005 (airdate)	2	1:05	Las Vegas, Nevada	The Ultimate Fighter 1 Semi-final round.
Win	1–0	Alex Schoenauer	Submission (strikes)	The Ultimate Fighter 1	March 14, 2005 (airdate)	1	1:20	Las Vegas, Nevada	The Ultimate Fighter 1 Quarterfinal round.

== Pay-per-view bouts ==
No.	Event	Fight	Venue	City	PPV Buys
1.	UFC 86	Jackson vs. Griffin	Mandalay Bay Events Center	Las Vegas, Nevada	540,000
2.	UFC 92	The Ultimate 2008	MGM Grand Garden Arena	Las Vegas, Nevada	1,050,000
3.	UFC 106	Ortiz vs. Griffin 2	Mandalay Bay Events Center	Las Vegas, Nevada	375,000

== Books ==
Griffin is the author of two books, 2009's Got Fight?: 50 Zen Principles of Hand-to-Face Combat and 2010's Be Ready When The Shit Goes Down: A Survival Guide to the Apocalypse, which both received positive reviews.

== Filmography ==
=== Films ===
Year	Title	Role	Notes
2009	I Hope They Serve Beer in Hell	Better Cop	
2010	13	Joey Blarro	
2010	Unrivaled	Landon 'The Brither' Popoff	
2010	Locked Down	Mule	

=== Television ===
Year	Title	Role	Notes
2007	Law & Order: Special Victims Unit	Mike Kona	Episode: "Fight"
2008	The Ultimate Fighter	Host	
2012	The Roots of Fight		2 episodes
2021	Hell's Kitchen	Himself	Episode: "Young Guns: If You Can't Stand the Heat..."

=== Video games ===
Year	Title	Role	Notes
2009	UFC 2009 Undisputed	Himself	Cover athlete
2010	UFC Undisputed 2010	Himself	
2012	UFC Undisputed 3	Himself	
2014	EA Sports UFC	Himself	
2016	EA Sports UFC 2	Himself	
2018	EA Sports UFC 3	Himself	
2020	EA Sports UFC 4	Himself	
2023	EA Sports UFC 5	Himself	

== See also ==
- List of current UFC fighters

Awards and achievements
Preceded by Quinton Jackson	8th UFC Light Heavyweight Champion; July 5, 2008 – December 27, 2008	Succeeded by Rashad Evans
