= The Ultimate Fighter 1 =

UFC mixed martial arts television series and event in 2005

- Season 1
- Starring: Dana White, Chuck Liddell, and Randy Couture

Release
- Original network: Spike TV
- Original release: January 17 – April 9, 2005

Season chronology
- Next → The Ultimate Fighter 2

The debut season of The Ultimate Fighter (later designated The Ultimate Fighter 1) premiered on January 17, 2005. Sixteen mixed martial arts fighters (eight light heavyweights weighing from 186 to 205 lb and eight middleweights weighing from 171 to 185 lb) were invited to participate in the show where they resided together and trained in two separate teams coached by UFC light heavyweight fighters Chuck Liddell and Randy Couture. The teams competed in physical challenges, segments hosted by singer Willa Ford, to determine which had the right to pair one of their fighters against an opponent of their choice in the same weight class, with the loser being eliminated.

The finale was broadcast live on April 9, 2005, where the two finalists in each weight class faced off for a contract with the UFC. It was the first live UFC broadcast on non-pay-per-view television, and it drew a very impressive 1.9 overall rating. The series was also broadcast in the United Kingdom in the spring of 2005 on Bravo. A 5-disc DVD set of The Ultimate Fighter was released on November 1, 2005.

== Cast ==
=== Coaches ===
- Chuck Liddell, head coach of blue team
- Randy Couture, head coach of green team
- Marc Laimon, grappling coach
- Ganyao Fairtex, Muay Thai coach
- Peter Welch, boxing coach

=== Fighters ===
Listed as originally assigned.

- Light heavyweights
  - Team Liddell: Bobby Southworth, Sam Hoger, Forrest Griffin, Alex Schoenauer
  - Team Couture: Stephan Bonnar, Mike Swick, Lodune Sincaid, Jason Thacker
- Middleweights
  - Team Liddell: Josh Koscheck, Diego Sanchez, Kenny Florian, Josh Rafferty
  - Team Couture: Nathan Quarry, Chris Leben, Alex Karalexis, Chris Sanford

=== Others ===
- Hosts: Dana White, Willa Ford
- Narrator: Mike Rowe

== Episodes ==
Episode 1: "The Quest Begins" (original airdate: 17 January 2005)

- The 16 fighters are driven to the UFC Training Center in Las Vegas, Nevada, where they meet Willa Ford, Dana White, and the coaches, Randy Couture and Chuck Liddell.
- At the house, Chris Leben keeps on drinking heavily, and starts to make fun of Jason Thacker, and give people nicknames.
- At 2:00 am, while Thacker is in the shower, Leben decides to urinate on his teammate's pillow, without him noticing.
- The fighters are woken up at 5:00 am by Couture and Liddell, and the first day of training proves too much for almost half of the fighters.
- During the jiu jitsu training, Nate Quarry cuts himself on his chin after landing a takedown.
- After the second day of training, Thacker talks to Couture and says that the training is too much for him, but Couture talks him into staying and trying to get the training done.
- On the 4th day, everyone is ready to spar, except for Thacker, because of the training, so Bobby Southworth and Lodune Sincaid decide to talk him into going with them, saying they need him and he is part of the team.
- While Forrest Griffin and Stephan Bonnar are sparring, Griffin accidentally headbutts Bonnar, causing a need for stitches.
- Light heavyweight and middleweight teams are chosen by coaches Liddell and Couture:

Coach	1st pick	2nd pick	3rd pick	4th pick	5th pick	6th pick	7th pick	8th pick
Liddell	Bobby Southworth	Josh Koscheck	Diego Sanchez	Sam Hoger	Forrest Griffin	Kenny Florian	Alex Schoenauer	Josh Rafferty
Couture	Nate Quarry	Chris Leben	Stephan Bonnar	Mike Swick	Lodune Sincaid	Alex Karalexis	Chris Sanford	Jason Thacker

Episode 2: "Team Challenges" (original airdate: 24 January 2005)

- Diego Sanchez and Stephen Bonnar argue over asparagus, because Sanchez ate the asparagus heads and left the stalks in the fridge.
- Team Liddell wins the first light heavyweight challenge.
- Later that night, Lodune Sincaid is making jokes about being homosexual, like dressing in dresses.
- Jason Thacker is sent home by Couture.
- Chris Leben and Sincaid continue to drink and starts to offend people. Later, a drunk Leben decides to hop the wall and find a pay phone to call someone, not mentioned.
- The next morning at practice, Couture finds out about the incident, and Leben and Sincaid apologize for their actions.
- Team Liddell wins the first middleweight Challenge.
- Chris Sanford is sent home by Couture.

Episode 3: "Making Weight" (original airdate: 31 January 2005)

- Alex Schoenauer wins the light heavyweight challenge. Bobby Southworth comes in last and will be forced to fight in the elimination bout.
- Team Liddell chooses Southworth to fight Lodune Sincaid.
- Southworth has to cut 20 lb. in 24 hours, with the help of Josh Koscheck and Liddell, but he comes in at 208 lb, so the Nevada State Athletic Commission gives Southworth 2 hours to cut 2 pounds, and he successfully makes it to 206 lb.
- Southworth describes the weight cut as "pure hell."
- Bobby Southworth defeated Lodune Sincaid by KO (strikes) at 0:12 of the second round.

Episode 4: "On The Ropes" (original airdate: 7 February 2005)

- Alex Schoenauer is traded to Team Couture as part of a team reshuffle.
- Team Liddell wins the middleweight challenge and the opportunity to schedule the next fight.
- The blue team chooses Sanchez to fight Karalexis.
- Diego Sanchez defeated Alex Karalexis by submission (rear naked choke) at 1:47 of the first round.

Episode 5: "Un-Caged" (original airdate: 14 February 2005)

- Nate Quarry injures his ankle after Couture lands on his ankle during a takedown in practice.
- White decides to allow the fighters to have a night out at the Hard Rock Cafe, and had a few drinks, and some of them get drunk.
- At 2:00 am, the fighters are drunk and continuing to drink, and Josh Rafferty says that there is no more alcohol in the house.
- By the pool, Chris Leben says something that angers Bobby Southworth, and then Southworth calls Leben a "fatherless bastard," which hurts Leben's feelings. Five minutes later, Southworth apologizes to Leben, but seems insincere.
- Leben decides to sleep outside to stay away from the other fighters.
- At 3:30 am, Josh Koscheck and Southworth continue to drink and then decide to pull a prank on Leben, by spraying water on the Team Couture member while he is sleeping. This wakes Leben, and causes him to go on a rampage by punching the front door window with his left hand, which cuts his knuckle skin off. Leben then punches Forrest Griffin's door in half, and Griffin later comments that there are pieces of the bedroom door in his bed.
- The next day, White tells Couture and Liddell what happened the previous night between Southworth, Koscheck, and Leben. The fighters are then brought in to explain what happened.
- White decides that the only fair way to resolve the situation is for Koscheck and Leben to fight.

Episode 6: "The Fight Is On" (original airdate: 21 February 2005)

- As fallout from the previous episode, there is no challenge and White schedules the middleweight fight between Leben and Koscheck.
- Josh Koscheck defeated Chris Leben by unanimous decision after two rounds.

Episode 7: "Ground And Pound" (original airdate: 28 February 2005)

- Josh Rafferty is traded to Team Couture in another team reshuffle.
- Team Couture wins the light heavyweight challenge.
- Stephan Bonnar defeated Bobby Southworth by split decision after 2 rounds.

Episode 8: "Sprawl N Brawl" (original airdate: 7 March 2005)

- After his fight with Stephen Bonnar, Bobby Southworth and White have a shouting match about Southworth's attitude and disrespectfulness.
- Nate Quarry is eliminated from the show due to his ankle injury. White asks Quarry to stay on as an assistant coach, and he agrees.
- Quarry gets to choose his replacement from the loser's lounge, and he chooses Chris Leben.
- Team Couture wins the middleweight challenge.
- Diego Sanchez defeated Josh Rafferty by submission (rear naked choke) at 1:48 of the first round.

Episode 9: "Low Blow" (original airdate: 14 March 2005)

- Kenny Florian is traded to Team Couture in another team reshuffle.
- Team Liddell wins the light heavyweight challenge.
- Sam Hoger is accused of stealing from the other competitors.
- Forrest Griffin defeated Alex Schoenauer by submission (strikes) at 1:20 of the first round.
- During his fight with Schoenauer, Griffin receives a cut above his left eye that doctors think is possibly severe enough to prevent him from fighting again.

Episode 10: "Middleweight Semi-Final #1" (original airdate: 21 March 2005)

- Forrest Griffin has to choose a light heavyweight fighter to come back into the house in the case he gets sent home. He chooses Bobby Southworth, who is not given the chance to fight, as Griffin is cleared.
- Kenny Florian defeated Chris Leben by TKO (doctor stoppage) at 3:11 of the second round.

Episode 11: "Middleweight Semi-Final #2" (original airdate: 28 March 2005)

- Diego Sanchez defeated Josh Koscheck by split decision after 3 rounds although one judge did give all 3 rounds to Koscheck.

Episode 12: "Light Heavyweight Semi-Finals" (original airdate: 4 April 2005)

- Forrest Griffin defeated Sam Hoger by TKO (strikes) at 1:05 of the second round.
- Stephan Bonnar defeated Mike Swick by submission (triangle armbar) at 4:58 of the first round.

== Light heavyweight bracket ==
Semi-finals
Sam Hoger	2
Forrest Griffin	TKO
Stephan Bonnar	SUB
Mike Swick	1

Finale
Forrest Griffin	UD
Stephan Bonnar	3

== Middleweight bracket ==
Semi-finals
Josh Koscheck	3
Diego Sanchez	SD
Kenny Florian	TKO
Chris Leben*	2

Finale
Diego Sanchez	TKO
Kenny Florian	1

* Nate Quarry was slated to fight Florian but an injury forced him to be replaced by Leben.

Legend

	Team Liddell
	Team Couture
UD	Unanimous Decision
SD	Split Decision
SUB	Submission
TKO	Technical Knockout

== The Ultimate Fighter: Team Couture vs. Team Liddell Finale ==
The Ultimate Fighter: Team Couture vs. Team Liddell Finale
- The poster for The Ultimate Fighter: Team Couture vs. Team Liddell Finale
- Promotion: Ultimate Fighting Championship
- Date: April 9, 2005
- Venue: Cox Pavilion
- City: Las Vegas, Nevada

Event chronology
UFC 51: Super Saturday	The Ultimate Fighter: Team Couture vs. Team Liddell Finale	UFC 52: Couture vs Liddell 2

The Ultimate Fighter: Team Couture vs. Team Liddell Finale (originally broadcast as The Ultimate Fighter: Ultimate Finale, and also known as The Ultimate Fighter 1 Finale) was a mixed martial arts event held by the Ultimate Fighting Championship (UFC) on April 9, 2005. Featured were the finals from The Ultimate Fighter 1 in both the middleweight and light heavyweight divisions.

Although the main event featured Rich Franklin against Ken Shamrock, the light heavyweight finale between Forrest Griffin and Stephan Bonnar received significant attention. The three-round match went to a decision, with Griffin winning. Both fighters were subsequently awarded UFC contracts.

Originally, Tito Ortiz was offered to fight Ken Shamrock in a rematch at this event. However, Ortiz left the UFC shortly after UFC 51 due to contract disputes.

=== Forrest Griffin vs. Stephan Bonnar fight ===
Even though both Forrest Griffin and Stephan Bonnar had good records at the time (Griffin 9–2, Bonnar 7–1), many were expecting this fight to be nothing more than filler before the main event between Ken Shamrock and Rich Franklin.

Both fighters had rough, controversial, and impressive wins to make it to the finale. In their first fights, Griffin defeated Alex Schoenauer by TKO but suffered what appeared to be a serious cut above his eye; Bonnar earned a controversial decision win over seasonal favorite Bobby Southworth. In the semi-finals, both fighters finished their opponents with Griffin defeating teammate Sam Hoger by TKO and Bonnar defeating teammate Mike Swick by Submission.

UFC President Dana White credits this fight as being the driving force behind the future success of the UFC, often stating that due to the fight Spike TV offered them a second season of the show. An estimated three million viewers saw the Bonnar-Griffin fight live on Spike, and the resulting pay-per-view where coaches Liddell and Couture squared off saw a then-record 280,000 buys. It also kicked off what has been termed "the TUF boom", where interest in both watching MMA fights as well as training in disciplines such as Brazilian jiu-jitsu, amateur wrestling, and judo rose amongst the general public. In 2013 both Griffin and Bonnar were inducted into the UFC Hall of Fame, and whilst Griffin went on to win the UFC Light Heavyweight Championship, this fight is still considered the highlight of both fighters' careers.

=== Results ===
Main Card
Weight class				Method	Round	Time	Notes
Light Heavyweight	Rich Franklin	def.	Ken Shamrock	TKO (punches)	1	2:42
Light Heavyweight	Forrest Griffin	def.	Stephan Bonnar	Decision (unanimous) (29–28, 29–28, 29–28)	3	5:00	(Note: Griffin wins by unanimous decision (29–28, 29–28, 29–28) in what is described as one of the best fights in the history of the UFC. He was the first Ultimate Fighter winner in the light heavyweight division, but Dana White grants Bonnar a UFC contract as well after his performance (see Forrest Griffin vs. Stephan Bonnar).)
Middleweight	Diego Sanchez	def.	Kenny Florian	TKO (punches)	1	2:49	(Note: Sanchez becomes the first middleweight winner of The Ultimate Fighter.)
Preliminary card
Light Heavyweight	Sam Hoger	def.	Bobby Southworth	Decision (unanimous) (29–28, 30–28, 29–28)	3	5:00
Middleweight	Chris Leben	def.	Jason Thacker	TKO (punches)	1	1:35
Middleweight	Josh Koscheck	def.	Chris Sanford	KO (punch)	1	4:21
Middleweight	Nate Quarry	def.	Lodune Sincaid	TKO (punches)	1	3:17
Middleweight	Mike Swick	def.	Alex Schoenauer	KO (punch)	1	0:20
Welterweight	Alex Karalexis	def.	Josh Rafferty	TKO (punches)	1	1:40

==== Encyclopedia awards ====
The following fighters were honored in the October 2011 book titled UFC Encyclopedia.

- Fight of the Night: Forrest Griffin vs. Stephan Bonnar
- Knockout of the Night: Josh Koscheck

== Coaches' Fight ==
UFC 52: Couture vs. Liddell 2 was held on April 16, 2005 in Paradise, Nevada.

Main Card
Weight class				Method	Round	Time	Notes
Light Heavyweight	Chuck Liddell	def.	Randy Couture (c)	KO (punches)	1	2:06	(Note: For the UFC Light Heavyweight Championship.)

== See also ==
- Ultimate Fighting Championship
- List of UFC champions
- List of UFC events
- 2005 in UFC
- The Ultimate Fighter
- List of current UFC fighters
