= Scott Lighty =

American kickboxer and mixed martial arts fighter

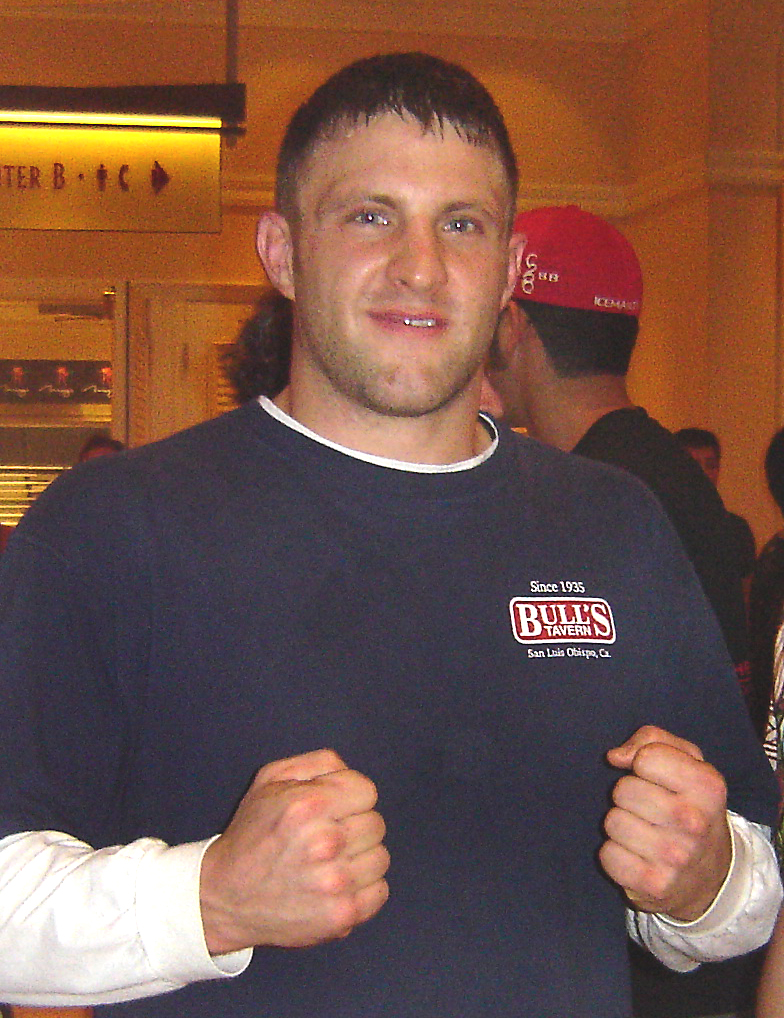
- Born: October 15, 1978 (age 48); San Carlos, California, United States
- Other names: Lights Out
- Nationality: American
- Height: 1.88 m (6 ft 2 in)
- Weight: 202 lb (92 kg; 14.4 st)
- Division: Heavyweight (Kickboxing); Light Heavyweight (MMA)
- Reach: 74 in (190 cm)
- Style: Muay Thai, Kickboxing, Kajukenbo
- Fighting out of: San Luis Obispo, California
- Team: The Pit; Fairtex Gym
- Trainer: John Hackleman
- Years active: 2002–present

Kickboxing record
- Total: 42
- Wins: 29
- By knockout: 6
- Losses: 11
- Draws: 2

Mixed martial arts record
- Total: 8
- Wins: 6
- By knockout: 4
- By submission: 1
- By decision: 1
- Losses: 2
- By knockout: 2

Other information
- Mixed martial arts record from Sherdog

Scott Lighty (born October 15, 1978) is an American Heavyweight kickboxer and Light Heavyweight mixed martial artist. Lighty formerly fought for the Strikeforce and K-1 promotions. He also owns a small business, Lighty's Independent Volkswagen Repair.

== Kickboxing career ==
=== K-1 career ===
Lighty made his K-1 debut as a tournament reserve fighter on the August 2004 K-1 card in Las Vegas, Nevada, scoring a second-round knockout over Frank Cota. In 2005, he finished as a runner-up at "Mayhem At The Mirage" tournament. He knocked out Tatsufumi Tomihira by a high kick in the quarterfinals and beat Chalid Arrab by a unanimous decision in the semifinals. In the final bout, Lighty remained on his feet, but took a considerable amount of punishment from the Russian kickboxer Ruslan Karaev and lost the fight after three rounds of action.

== Mixed martial arts career ==
=== Mixed martial arts career ===
After 2007, there were not many K-1 fights held in the United States and Lighty decided to switch from kickboxing to mixed martial arts. He made his professional debut on the reality show TapouT and won that battle by verbal submission in the first round over Derek Thornton. In his next fight, Lighty fought Antwain Britt at Strikeforce: Evolution. Lighty lost via TKO (doctor stoppage) after the first round.

== Titles ==
- 2005 K-1 World Grand Prix in Las Vegas II runner up
- 2004 Rising Sun Heavyweight Tournament Champion

== Kickboxing record ==
Kickboxing record
29 wins (6 KO's), 11 losses, 2 draws
Date	Result	Opponent	Event	Location	Method	Round	Time	Notes
December 8, 2006	Loss	Patrick Barry	Shin Do Kumate XI	Tampa, Florida, USA	KO (right high kick)	3		
August 12, 2006	Loss	Stefan Leko	K-1 World Grand Prix 2006 in Las Vegas II	Las Vegas, Nevada, USA	TKO (referee stoppage)	3	0:58	2006 Las Vegas Grand Prix II quarter-final.
April 29, 2006	Loss	(Trinidad and Tobago) Gary Goodridge	K-1 World Grand Prix 2006 in Las Vegas	Las Vegas, Nevada, USA	TKO (punch)	1	0:34	2006 Las Vegas Grand Prix semi-final.
April 29, 2006	Win	Dewey Cooper	K-1 World Grand Prix 2006 in Las Vegas	Las Vegas, Nevada, USA	Decision (unanimous)	3	3:00	2006 Las Vegas Grand Prix quarter-final.
August 13, 2005	Loss	Ruslan Karaev	K-1 World Grand Prix 2005 in Las Vegas II	Las Vegas, Nevada, USA	Decision (unanimous)	3	3:00	2005 Las Vegas Grand Prix II final.
August 13, 2005	Win	Chalid Arrab	K-1 World Grand Prix 2005 in Las Vegas II	Las Vegas, Nevada, USA	Decision (unanimous)	3	3:00	2005 Las Vegas Grand Prix II semi-final.
August 13, 2005	Win	Tatsufumi Tomihira	K-1 World Grand Prix 2005 in Las Vegas II	Las Vegas, Nevada, USA	KO (right high kick)	1	1:23	2005 Las Vegas Grand Prix II quarter-final.
April 30, 2005	Loss	Gary Goodridge	K-1 World Grand Prix 2005 in Las Vegas	Las Vegas, Nevada, USA	TKO (low kicks)	1	2:55	2005 Las Vegas Grand Prix semi-final.
April 30, 2005	Win	Patrick Barry	K-1 World Grand Prix 2005 in Las Vegas	Las Vegas, Nevada, USA	Decision (split)	3	3:00	2005 Las Vegas Grand Prix reserve bout.
August 7, 2004	Loss	Mighty Mo	K-1 World Grand Prix 2004 in Las Vegas II	Las Vegas, Nevada, USA	KO (right overhand)	1	1:29	2004 Las Vegas Grand Prix II semi-final.
August 7, 2004	Win	Frank Cota, Jr.	K-1 World Grand Prix 2004 in Las Vegas II	Las Vegas, Nevada, USA	KO	2	1:41	2004 Las Vegas Grand Prix II reserve bout.
April 30, 2004	Win	Sean McCully	K-1 World Grand Prix 2004 in Las Vegas I	Las Vegas, Nevada, USA	TKO	2	2:04	2004 Las Vegas Grand Prix I reserve bout.
September 29, 2001	Win	Aaron Weiss	ISKA Strikeforce	San Jose, California, USA	Decision (unanimous)	3	3:00	
December 2, 2000	Loss	Carter Williams		Monterey, California, USA	KO (high kick)	1		
Legend: Win Loss Draw/No contest

== Mixed martial arts record ==
Professional record breakdown
8 matches	6 wins	2 losses
By knockout	4	2
By submission	1	0
By decision	1	0

Res.	Record	Opponent	Method	Event	Date	Round	Time	Location	Notes
Loss	6–2	Lorenz Larkin	TKO ( punches)	Strikeforce Challengers: Wilcox vs. Damm	April 1, 2011	2	3:15	Stockton, United States	
Win	6–1	Shawn Frye	TKO ( punches)	Fight for Wrestling 2	August 14, 2010	2	1:36	Bakersfield, United States	
Loss	5–1	Antwain Britt	TKO (doctor stoppage)	Strikeforce: Evolution	December 19, 2009	1	5:00	San Jose, United States	
Win	5–0	Mike Cook	TKO (punch to the body)	Strikeforce: Carano vs. Cyborg	August 15, 2009	1	2:05	San Jose, United States	
Win	4–0	Jamiah Williamson	TKO (punches)	ShoXC: Elite Challenger Series	September 26, 2008	1	4:51	Santa Ynez, United States	
Win	3–0	Kawika Morton	Decision (unanimous)	PureCombat: Hard Core	August 15, 2008	3	5:00	Visalia, United States	
Win	2–0	Paul Mince	TKO (doctor stoppage)	PureCombat: Lights Out	February 29, 2008	1	3:00	Visalia, United States	
Win	1–0	Derek Thornton	Submission (verbal)	PFC 6: No Retreat, No Surrender	January 17, 2008	1	2:33	Lemoore, United States	

== See also ==
- List of K-1 events
- List of male kickboxers
- List of male mixed martial artists
