= Mondelli =

Mondelli is a surname. Notable people with the surname include:

- Filippo Mondelli (1994–2021), Italian rower
- Luigi Mondelli (born 1972), Brazilian-American Brazilian jiu-jitsu practitioner
