= Luigi Mondelli =

Brazilian Jiu-Jitsu Practitioner, Combatives Specialist, MMA Coach

- Born: March 24, 1972 (age 54); Rio de Janeiro, Brazil
- Nationality: Brazilian; American
- Weight: (+100kg / 221lb)
- Division: Ultra-Heavyweight
- Stance: Orthodox
- Fighting out of: Danbury, CT
- Team: KORE BJJ / American Top Team
- Rank: Fifth Degree Black Belt in Brazilian Jiu-Jitsu; Green Belt in Judo
- Years active: 26

Other information
- Website: http://koremartialarts.com/?team=luigi-mondelli

Luigi Mondelli (born March 24, 1972) is a Brazilian-American Brazilian jiu-jitsu practitioner and MMA Coach based in Danbury, Connecticut. He is the head coach of American Top Team's Connecticut program under the umbrella of Ricardo Libório and the co-founder and head coach of his own program, KORE. Mondelli is a five-time Panamerican champion and a three-time world masters champion.

Mondelli began training in Brazilian jiu-jitsu in 1991 under the instruction of Adalberto "Buda" de Souza and Crézio de Souza at their school in Petropolis, until attaining the rank of purple belt. When his family relocated to Rio de Janeiro, Mondelli continued his training receiving his black belt in December 2001. Most recently Mondelli was awarded his fourth degree by Adalberto "Buda" de Souza in 2015.

In addition to winning multiple championships, Mondelli has graduated a number of successful black belts and professional MMA fighters, notably Glover Teixeira. Mondelli oversees the curriculum of his Kore program from its headquarters in Danbury, designed to link the disciplines of Brazilian jiu-jitsu, wrestling and judo in a fluid and practical method of application.

== Brazilian Jiu-Jitsu career ==
Luigi Mondelli began competing during his teenage years in Rio de Janeiro, Brazil, first winning the Masters Purple Belt Category in 1999 before winning the Pan-American Championship five times. Mondelli is also a three-time IBJJF world champion as a black belt in the Senior division in the gi and no-gi categories.

In 2003, Mondelli moved to the United States, ultimately settling in Connecticut. Soon after Mondelli arrived, Ricardo Liborio invited him to be part of American Top Team (ATT). While representing ATT throughout his career in the United States, Mondelli founded an martial arts association of his own in 2011, named Kore Brazilian Jiu Jitsu. The association claims to have a philosophy centered around promoting grappling traditions and techniques in the sport of Brazilian jiu-jitsu.

Mondelli has been a guest instructor and coach at The Pit, a martial arts camp started by John Hackleman, which is known for having trained notable fighters such as Chuck Liddell and Glover Teixeira. Mondelli has also marketed a line of self-defense and combatives instruction to military and law enforcement personnel.

== Other Rankings ==
Luigi Mondelli also holds the 5th Degree Black Belt in RMA under Walt Lysak, and 2nd degree Black Belt in Hawaiian Kenpo under Greg Davis.
