= Glover Teixeira =

Brazilian mixed martial artist (born 1979)

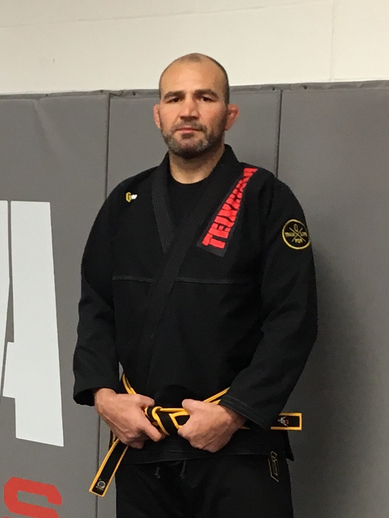
- Teixeira at his training facility in 2019
- Born: Glover Lucas Teixeira; 28 October 1979 (age 46); Sobrália, Minas Gerais, Brazil
- Citizenship: Brazil; United States (since 2020)
- Height: 6 ft 2 in (1.88 m)
- Weight: 205 lb (93 kg; 14.6 st)
- Division: Light heavyweight
- Reach: 76 in (193 cm)
- Style: Brazilian Jiu-Jitsu
- Fighting out of: Bethel, Connecticut, U.S.
- Team: Teixeira MMA & Fitness
- Trainer: Fernely Feliz Sr. John Hackleman; Steve Mocco
- Rank: 8th degree black belt in Kajukenbo under John Hackleman; 2nd degree black belt in Brazilian Jiu-Jitsu under Luigi Mondelli
- Years active: 2002–2023

Mixed martial arts record
- Total: 42
- Wins: 33
- By knockout: 18
- By submission: 10
- By decision: 5
- Losses: 9
- By knockout: 3
- By submission: 1
- By decision: 5

Other information
- Website: www.TeixeiraMMAandFitness.com
- Mixed martial arts record from Sherdog

Glover Lucas Teixeira (Portuguese pronunciation: [ˈɡloveʁ tejˈʃejɾɐ]; born 28 October 1979) is a Brazilian-American former professional mixed martial artist. He competed in the Light Heavyweight division of the Ultimate Fighting Championship (UFC), where he is a former UFC Light Heavyweight Champion. Teixeira is a former member of the Brazilian National Wrestling Team and has competed in the WEC, Impact FC, PFC and Shooto. He is the second oldest UFC champion in history behind Randy Couture and the oldest first time champion in UFC history.

== Background ==
Teixeira is originally from the rural community of Sobrália, Minas Gerais, Brazil and is of Portuguese descent. There was no electricity in many of the homes in his community, and there was only one gas station. He moved to Danbury, Connecticut in 1999 to help support his family and found a job in landscaping. It was there that he met his wife, Ingrid.

After watching boxers such as Mike Tyson and the early mixed martial arts fighters such as UFC Hall of Famer Royce Gracie and Chuck Liddell compete, Teixeira decided that he wanted to follow the same path. He had never heard of Brazilian jiu-jitsu, but was able to find and watch videos of UFC 1 and UFC 2, which featured Royce Gracie.

After working 10 to 12-hour days landscaping, Teixeira did boxing training at Hat City Boxing and Brazilian jiu-jitsu at American Top Team Connecticut. John Hackleman, who had trained a fighter who fought Teixeira and was impressed by the young Brazilian, invited Teixeira to his gym in California, The Pit, where Teixeira began training with Chuck Liddell. Teixeira now trains and instructs at his own gym Teixeira MMA & Fitness in Bethel, Connecticut.

In November 2020, Teixeira became an American citizen. "I'm so proud today because I'm officially an American Citizen. Now I'm very proud to represent both Brazil & America," said Teixeira.

== Mixed martial arts career ==
Teixeira earned his 8th Degree Hawaiian Kempo Black Belt under Hackleman, owner of The Pit Martial Arts; he earned his Brazilian Jiu-Jitsu black belt under Luigi Mondelli, head coach at American Top Team Connecticut, and earned his Vale Tudo black belt under Marco Ruas of Ruas Vale Tudo. Teixeira is also CrossFit certified.

=== Ultimate Fighting Championship ===
On 21 February 2012, it was announced that Teixeira had signed a deal with the UFC and would make his debut in early summer 2012.

Teixeira debuted in the UFC on 26 May 2012 at UFC 146, facing Kyle Kingsbury. After a quick exchange, Teixeira won by submission at 1:53 of the first round.

Teixeira was expected to face former UFC Light Heavyweight Champion Quinton Jackson on 13 October 2012 at UFC 153. However, Jackson pulled out of the bout citing an injury and was replaced by Fábio Maldonado. Teixeira dominated Maldonado throughout the fight, resulting in the doctor stopping the fight at the end of round two.

Teixeira and Quinton Jackson took place on 26 January 2013 at UFC on Fox 6. Teixeira outboxed Jackson and scored a knockdown in round 1. He also outwrestled Jackson and used his jiu-jitsu to dominate him on the ground, proceeding to a unanimous decision 30–27 (twice) and 29–28 win.

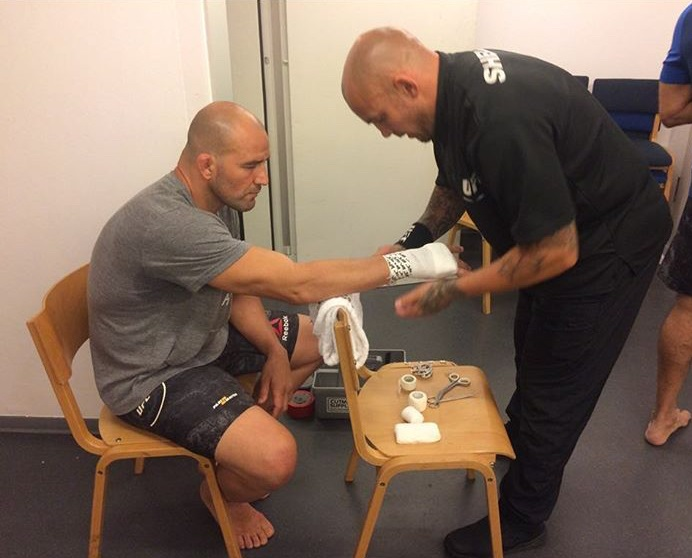
Teixeira getting hands wrapped before a fight in 2019

Teixeira was expected to face Ryan Bader on 25 May 2013 at UFC 160. However, Bader withdrew from the bout citing an injury and was replaced by James Te Huna. Teixeira won by submission with a guillotine choke in the first round. The performance earned Teixeira Submission of the Night honors.

The bout with Bader eventually took place on 4 September 2013 as the main event at UFC Fight Night 28. Teixeira won the fight via TKO in the first round. The win also earned Teixeira his first Knockout of the Night bonus award. With the victory, Teixeira earned an opportunity at the UFC Light Heavyweight title.

Zuffa initially announced Teixeira would face Jon Jones on 1 February 2014 at UFC 169. However, on 7 October, Dana White said the announcement for this fight on that card was premature and that Jones and Teixeira would face each other on a different card. The bout with Jones was expected to take place on 22 February 2014 at UFC 170. Jones and Teixeira eventually took place on 26 April 2014 at UFC 172. Teixeira lost the bout via unanimous decision.

Teixeira faced Phil Davis on 22 October 2014 at UFC 179. Teixeira lost the fight via unanimous decision.

Teixeira was expected to face Rashad Evans on 22 February 2015 at UFC Fight Night 61. However, on 7 January, Teixeira pulled out of the bout citing a knee injury that he had sustained in his last fight.

Teixeira was expected to face Alexander Gustafsson on 20 June 2015 at UFC Fight Night 69. However, it was announced on 1 May that Gustafsson had been removed from the card due to injury.

Teixeira faced Ovince Saint Preux on 8 August 2015 in the main event at UFC Fight Night 73. Teixeira won via submission in the third round. He was also awarded his first Fight of the Night bonus award.

Teixeira faced Patrick Cummins on 7 November 2015 at UFC Fight Night 77. He won the fight via TKO in the second round.

Teixeira faced Rashad Evans on 16 April 2016 at UFC on Fox 19. He won the fight via knockout in the first round and was awarded a Performance of the Night bonus.

Teixeira was expected to face Anthony Johnson on 23 July 2016 at UFC on Fox 20. However, Johnson pulled out of the bout to tend to personal issues. The bout was rescheduled and eventually took place at UFC 202. Johnson defeated Teixeira by knockout in the opening seconds of the fight.

Teixeira faced Jared Cannonier on 11 February 2017 at UFC 208. He won the fight by unanimous decision.

A rescheduled fight with Alexander Gustafsson took place on 28 May 2017 in the main event at UFC Fight Night 109. Teixeira lost the fight via knockout in the fifth round. Despite the loss, the bout earned Teixeira his second Fight of the Night bonus award.

Teixeira was scheduled to face Misha Cirkunov on 28 October 2017 at UFC Fight Night 119. However, the pairing was delayed after a recent hand surgery for Teixeira was slow to heal and the bout eventually took place on 16 December 2017 at UFC on Fox 26. Teixeira won the fight via TKO in the first round.

Teixeira was briefly linked to a bout with Volkan Oezdemir on 12 May 2018 at UFC 224. However, Oezdemir was pulled from that pairing in favor of a matchup with Maurício Rua at UFC Fight Night 134.

Teixeira was expected to face Ilir Latifi on 22 July 2018 at UFC Fight Night 134. However, on 5 July 2018, it was announced that Latifi was pulled from the event, citing injury. Latifi was replaced by Corey Anderson. He lost the fight via unanimous decision.

Teixeira was expected to face Jimi Manuwa on 22 September 2018 at UFC Fight Night 137. However, Teixeira suffered an injury in August and was removed from the match-up.

Teixeira was scheduled to face Ion Cuțelaba on 19 January 2019 at UFC Fight Night 143. However, on 10 January 2019, Cuțelaba was pulled out of the bout due to injury. After seeking a replacement for Cuțelaba, the UFC announced that Karl Roberson was stepping up to face Teixeira. Teixeira defeated Roberson by submission via arm triangle choke in the first round.

Teixeira eventually faced Cuțelaba at UFC Fight Night: Jacaré vs. Hermansson on 27 April 2019. He won the fight via submission via a rear-naked choke submission in the second round. The win also earned Teixeira his second Performance of the Night bonus award.

Teixeira faced Nikita Krylov on 14 September 2019 at UFC Fight Night 158. He won the back-and-forth fight via split decision.

Teixeira was originally scheduled to face Anthony Smith on 25 April 2020 at UFC Fight Night: Smith vs. Teixeira. However, on 9 April, Dana White, the president of UFC announced that this event was postponed and rescheduled to 13 May 2020 at UFC Fight Night: Smith vs. Teixeira. He won the fight via technical knockout in round five.

Teixeira was scheduled to face Thiago Santos on 12 September 2020 at UFC Fight Night 177. However, due to Teixeira testing positive for COVID-19 a week prior to the bout, the pair was rescheduled to fight on 4 October 2020 at UFC on ESPN: Holm vs. Aldana. In turn, on 15 September, the bout was postponed again as Santos also tested positive for the virus. The pairing with Santos eventually took place on 7 November 2020 at UFC on ESPN: Santos vs. Teixeira. Teixeira won the fight via a submission in round three.

==== UFC Light Heavyweight Championship ====
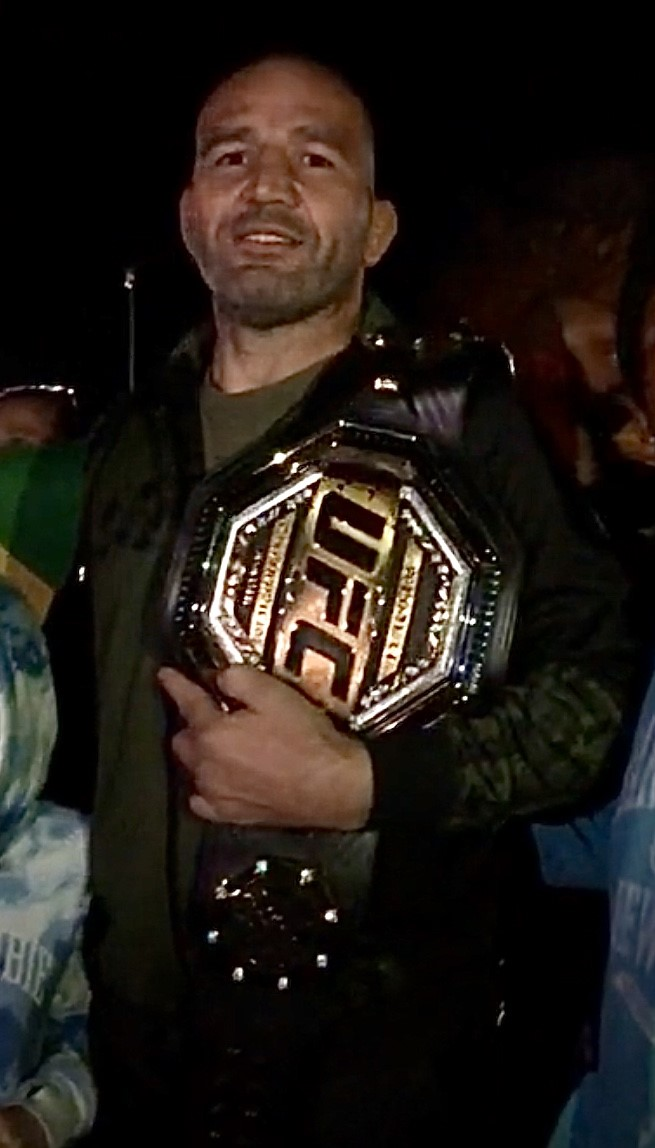
Glover Teixeira with his UFC championship belt, 2021

Teixeira was expected to face Jan Błachowicz on 25 September 2021 at UFC 266 for the UFC Light Heavyweight Championship. However, the bout was postponed and moved to 30 October 2021 at UFC 267. Teixeira won via submission due to a rear naked choke in the 2nd round, winning the UFC Light Heavyweight Championship. This win made him the oldest first time champion in UFC history at 42 years old, and also earned him the Performance of the Night award.

Teixeira was scheduled to defend his title against Jiří Procházka on 7 May 2022 at UFC 274. However, the bout was postponed to 11 June at UFC 275 for unknown reasons. After a back and forth battle, Teixeira lost the fight and title via rear-naked choke submission in the fifth round. This fight earned him the Fight of the Night award.

The rematch between Procházka and Teixeira was scheduled on 10 December 2022, at UFC 282. However, on 23 November, Procházka pulled out due to a shoulder injury that will require surgery and at least six months of rehabilitation. He decided to vacate the title, and Teixeira subsequently refused a replacement fight against Magomed Ankalaev. Therefore, the co-main event bout between former champion Jan Błachowicz and Ankalaev was promoted to the main event status and arranged for the vacant championship.

With the title staying vacant due to a draw, Teixeira faced Jamahal Hill on 21 January 2023, at UFC 283, for the vacant UFC Light Heavyweight Championship. He lost the bout via unanimous decision after being outstruck for five rounds and announced his retirement during the post-fight interview. This fight earned him the Fight of the Night award.

== Professional grappling career ==
Glover competed against Anthony Smith in the co-main event of UFC Fight Pass Invitational 4 on 29 June 2023. He won the match by decision.

== Professional boxing career ==
Glover competed against fellow UFC Light Heavyweight Champion Maurício Rua in the main event of Spaten Fight Night 3 on 29 Aug 2026. He won the match by decision after scoring an early knockdown in round two.

== Activism ==
In May 2013, Teixeira had prepared testimony and spoke before the Members of the Connecticut General Assembly Public Safety and Security Committee. Teixeira spoke in hopes of encouraging their vote to legalize and regulate Mixed Martial Arts in Connecticut. Teixeira ended his testimony by stating, "Having been in Connecticut since 1999, I can tell you that MMA is a very popular sport here as it is all over the world. Ironically, I can sit in my living room in Danbury and watch MMA on television. I can buy it on Pay-Per-View. I can watch it in restaurants and bars across Connecticut. I can go to Mixed Martial Arts gyms throughout the state and train to compete in MMA. And I can attend live events in nearby and at the Mohegan Sun and Foxwoods Casinos. But I cannot participate in a supervised and regulated live event here in Connecticut. In conclusion, I would just add that I would love to have the opportunity to participate in an event someday here in my home state of Connecticut."

In November 2013, Teixeira attended the UFC: Fight for the Troops 3. This event was the fourth that the UFC had hosted in cooperation with a military base to support the military. It helps raise money for the Intrepid Fallen Heroes Fund, which provides support for severely wounded military personnel and veterans and the families of military personnel lost in service. The first event reportedly raised $4 million during its three-hour broadcast.

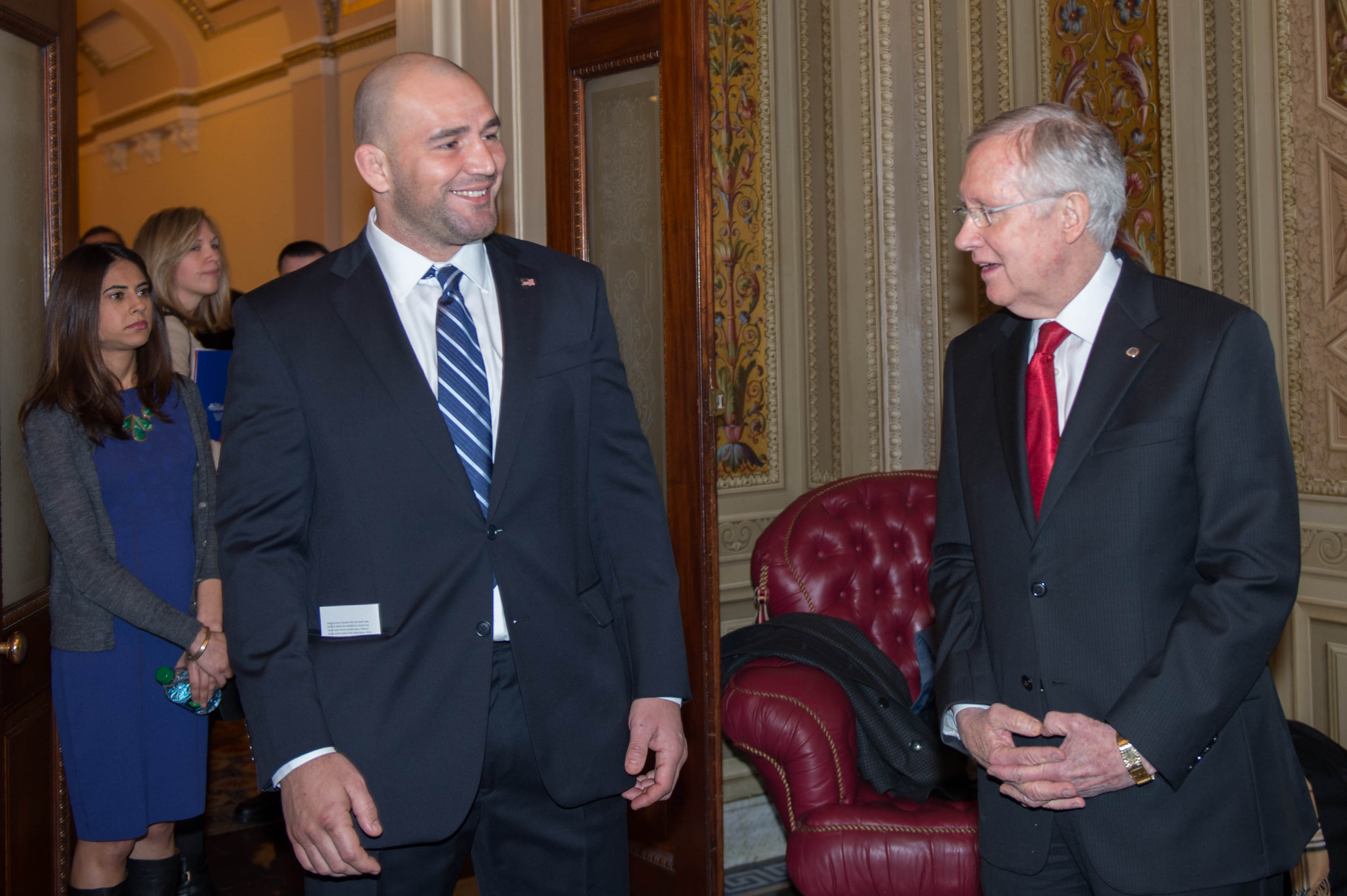
Teixeira and Reid in 2014

In February 2014, Teixeira went to the United States Capital and met with Senators John McCain and Harry Reid to support the continued research of the Cleveland Clinic's Lou Ruvo Center study of brain health. This landmark study is designed to look at the effects of combat sports on the human brain of professional fighters. This will continue the commitment to athlete safety and benefit athletes from many other sports. Also in attendance was UFC fighter Jon Jones, Chairman and CEO of The UFC Lorenzo Fertitta, SpikeTV President Kevin Kay, Top Rank President Todd duBoef, & Bernard Hopkins representing Golden Boy Promotions CEO Richard Schaefer.

In October 2014, Teixeira was a part of the 'Pink Bra' tour to raise money for early detection and prevention of breast cancer and breast cancer research. Danbury was one of 10 locations for 'Barbells for Boobs' on its 10-stop nationwide tour. "This is a good cause and I love it. I've lived in Danbury for the past 15 years, and anyway I can help I'm glad to," said Teixeira.

In 2016, the New American Dream Foundation, which is the philanthropic arm of the Tribuna CT Newspaper, recognized Teixeira with the "2016 American Dream Leadership Award". "I didn't put Danbury on the map. Danbury put me on the map. Danbury gave me the opportunity to train and become the fighter I am today," he said in his acceptance speech.

In 2022, Teixeira visited The Cure 4 The Kids Foundation to provide toys, inspiration and smiles during the holiday season. Along with other members of the UFC, Teixeira toured the facility, signed autographs, distributed Big Shots and joined members in a jumping jack and push up contest during the meet and greet.

== Championships and accomplishments ==
=== Mixed martial arts ===
- Ultimate Fighting Championship
  - UFC Light Heavyweight Championship (One time)
    - Oldest first-time champion in UFC history (42 years, 2 days)
      - Oldest fighter in history to win the UFC Light Heavyweight Championship
  - Performance of the Night (Four times) vs. Rashad Evans, Ion Cuțelaba, Anthony Smith, and Jan Błachowicz
  - Knockout of the Night (One time) vs. Ryan Bader
  - Submission of the Night (One time) vs. James Te-Huna
  - Fight of the Night (Four times) vs. Ovince Saint Preux, Alexander Gustafsson, Jiří Procházka, and Jamahal Hill
    - Most Post-Fight bonuses in UFC Light Heavyweight division history (10)
  - Most finishes in UFC Light Heavyweight division history (13)
  - Most submissions in UFC Light Heavyweight division history (7)
  - Second most wins in UFC Light Heavyweight division history (16)
  - Most submission attempts in UFC Light Heavyweight division history (16)
  - Most top position time in UFC Light Heavyweight division history (1:12:16)
  - Third most bouts in UFC Light Heavyweight division history (23)
  - Third most total fight time in UFC Light Heavyweight division history (4:25:06)
  - Third most control time in UFC Light Heavyweight division history (1:18:33)
  - Third most significant strikes landed in UFC Light Heavyweight division history (953)
  - Second most total strikes landed in UFC Light Heavyweight division history (1609)
  - Fifth most takedowns landed in UFC Light Heavyweight division history (36)
  - UFC Honors Awards
    - 2021: Fan's Choice Submission of the Year Nominee vs. Jan Błachowicz
    - 2022: President's Choice Fight of the Year Nominee vs. Jiří Procházka
    - 2023: President's Choice Fight of the Year Nominee vs. Jamahal Hill
  - UFC.com Awards
    - 2012: Newcomer of the Year
    - 2020: Ranked #8 Fighter of the Year
    - 2021: Ranked #8 Fighter of the Year
    - 2022: Fight of the Year vs. Jiří Procházka
    - 2023: Ranked #5 Fight of the Year vs. Jamahal Hill
- Shooto
  - South America 220-pound Championship (One time)
- Sherdog
  - 2012 Beatdown of the Year vs. Fábio Maldonado
  - 2012 All-Violence Second Team
  - 2013 All-Violence Third Team
  - 2020 Beatdown of the Year vs. Anthony Smith
  - 2022 Fight of the Year vs. Jiří Procházka
- The Athletic
  - 2020 Comeback Fighter of the Year
- BT Sport
  - 2020 Comeback of the Year
- Combat Press
  - 2020 Comeback of the Year vs. Thiago Santos
  - 2020 Comeback Fighter of the Year
  - 2021 Comeback Fighter of the Year
  - 2022 Fight of the Year vs. Jiří Procházka at UFC 275
- World MMA Awards
  - 2022 Fight of the Year vs. Jiří Procházka at UFC 275
- The Sporting News
  - 2022 Fight of the Year vs. Jiří Procházka at UFC 275
- ESPN
  - 2022 Fight of the Year vs. Jiří Procházka
- Cageside Press
  - 2022 Fight of the Year vs. Jiří Procházka at UFC 275
- Wrestling Observer Newsletter
  - 2022 MMA Match of the Year vs. Jiří Procházka at UFC 275
- Yahoo! Sports
  - 2022 Fight of the Year vs. Jiří Procházka at UFC 275
- Bleacher Report
  - 2022 UFC Fight of the Year vs. Jiří Procházka at UFC 275

=== Grappling ===
- Quintet Ultra
  - Team WEC 2019 grappling survival team

=== State/Local ===
- Key to the City of Danbury: 16 November 2021

== Mixed martial arts record ==
Professional record breakdown
42 matches	33 wins	9 losses
By knockout	18	3
By submission	10	1
By decision	5	5

Res.	Record	Opponent	Method	Event	Date	Round	Time	Location	Notes
Loss	33–9	Jamahal Hill	Decision (unanimous)	UFC 283	21 January 2023	5	5:00	Rio de Janeiro, Brazil	For the vacant UFC Light Heavyweight Championship. Fight of the Night.
Loss	33–8	Jiří Procházka	Submission (rear-naked choke)	UFC 275	11 June 2022	5	4:32	Kallang, Singapore	Lost the UFC Light Heavyweight Championship. Fight of the Night.
Win	33–7	Jan Błachowicz	Submission (rear-naked choke)	UFC 267	30 October 2021	2	3:02	Abu Dhabi, United Arab Emirates	Won the UFC Light Heavyweight Championship. Performance of the Night.
Win	32–7	Thiago Santos	Submission (rear-naked choke)	UFC on ESPN: Santos vs. Teixeira	7 November 2020	3	1:49	Las Vegas, Nevada, United States	
Win	31–7	Anthony Smith	TKO (punches)	UFC Fight Night: Smith vs. Teixeira	13 May 2020	5	1:04	Jacksonville, Florida, United States	Performance of the Night.
Win	30–7	Nikita Krylov	Decision (split)	UFC Fight Night: Cowboy vs. Gaethje	14 September 2019	3	5:00	Vancouver, British Columbia, Canada	
Win	29–7	Ion Cuțelaba	Submission (rear-naked choke)	UFC Fight Night: Jacaré vs. Hermansson	27 April 2019	2	3:37	Sunrise, Florida, United States	Performance of the Night.
Win	28–7	Karl Roberson	Submission (arm-triangle choke)	UFC Fight Night: Cejudo vs. Dillashaw	19 January 2019	1	3:21	Brooklyn, New York, United States	
Loss	27–7	Corey Anderson	Decision (unanimous)	UFC Fight Night: Shogun vs. Smith	22 July 2018	3	5:00	Hamburg, Germany	
Win	27–6	Misha Cirkunov	TKO (punches)	UFC on Fox: Lawler vs. dos Anjos	16 December 2017	1	2:45	Winnipeg, Manitoba, Canada	
Loss	26–6	Alexander Gustafsson	KO (punches)	UFC Fight Night: Gustafsson vs. Teixeira	28 May 2017	5	1:07	Stockholm, Sweden	Fight of the Night.
Win	26–5	Jared Cannonier	Decision (unanimous)	UFC 208	11 February 2017	3	5:00	Brooklyn, New York, United States	
Loss	25–5	Anthony Johnson	KO (punch)	UFC 202	20 August 2016	1	0:13	Las Vegas, Nevada, United States	
Win	25–4	Rashad Evans	KO (punches)	UFC on Fox: Teixeira vs. Evans	16 April 2016	1	1:48	Tampa, Florida, United States	Performance of the Night.
Win	24–4	Patrick Cummins	TKO (punches)	UFC Fight Night: Belfort vs. Henderson 3	7 November 2015	2	1:12	São Paulo, Brazil	
Win	23–4	Ovince Saint Preux	Technical Submission (rear-naked choke)	UFC Fight Night: Teixeira vs. Saint Preux	8 August 2015	3	3:10	Nashville, Tennessee, United States	Fight of the Night.
Loss	22–4	Phil Davis	Decision (unanimous)	UFC 179	25 October 2014	3	5:00	Rio de Janeiro, Brazil	
Loss	22–3	Jon Jones	Decision (unanimous)	UFC 172	26 April 2014	5	5:00	Baltimore, Maryland, United States	For the UFC Light Heavyweight Championship.
Win	22–2	Ryan Bader	TKO (punches)	UFC Fight Night: Teixeira vs. Bader	4 September 2013	1	2:55	Belo Horizonte, Brazil	Knockout of the Night.
Win	21–2	James Te Huna	Submission (guillotine choke)	UFC 160	25 May 2013	1	2:38	Las Vegas, Nevada, United States	Submission of the Night.
Win	20–2	Quinton Jackson	Decision (unanimous)	UFC on Fox: Johnson vs. Dodson	26 January 2013	3	5:00	Chicago, Illinois, United States	
Win	19–2	Fábio Maldonado	TKO (doctor stoppage)	UFC 153	13 October 2012	2	5:00	Rio de Janeiro, Brazil	
Win	18–2	Kyle Kingsbury	Submission (arm-triangle choke)	UFC 146	26 May 2012	1	1:53	Las Vegas, Nevada, United States	
Win	17–2	Ricco Rodriguez	TKO (submission to punches)	MMA Against Dengue	27 November 2011	1	1:58	Rio de Janeiro, Brazil	
Win	16–2	Marvin Eastman	KO (punch)	Shooto Brasil: Fight for BOPE	25 August 2011	1	4:00	Rio de Janeiro, Brazil	
Win	15–2	Antonio Mendes	Submission (rear-naked choke)	Shooto Brazil 24	5 August 2011	1	4:06	Brasília, Brazil	Won the Shooto South America 220 lb Championship.
Win	14–2	Márcio Cruz	TKO (punches)	Fight Club 1: Brazilian Stars	20 July 2011	2	4:21	Rio de Janeiro, Brazil	
Win	13–2	Simão Melo da Silva	KO (punches)	Shooto Brazil 23	4 June 2011	1	1:49	Rio de Janeiro, Brazil	
Win	12–2	Daniel Tabera	Decision (unanimous)	Bitetti Combat 8: 100 anos do Corinthians	4 December 2010	3	5:00	São Paulo, Brazil	
Win	11–2	Marko Peselj	TKO (punches)	Impact FC 2	18 July 2010	1	3:01	Sydney, Australia	
Win	10–2	Tiago Monaco Tosato	TKO (punches)	Bitetti Combat MMA 7	28 May 2010	1	1:27	Rio de Janeiro, Brazil	
Win	9–2	Joaquim Ferreira	TKO (corner stoppage)	Bitetti Combat MMA 6	25 February 2010	2	1:30	Brasília, Brazil	
Win	8–2	Leonardo Nascimento Lucio	Technical Submission (guillotine choke)	Bitetti Combat MMA 4	12 September 2009	1	3:11	Rio de Janeiro, Brazil	
Win	7–2	Buckley Acosta	TKO (punches)	PFC 7: Palace Fighting Championship 7	20 February 2008	1	1:00	Lemoore, California, United States	
Win	6–2	Jorge Oliveira	KO (punches)	PFC 6: No Retreat, No Surrender	17 January 2008	1	0:05	Lemoore, California, United States	
Win	5–2	Rameau Thierry Sokoudjou	KO (punches)	WEC 24	12 October 2006	1	1:41	Lemoore, California, United States	
Win	4–2	Jack Morrison	Submission (rear-naked choke)	WEC 22	28 July 2006	1	1:27	Lemoore, California, United States	
Win	3–2	Carlton Jones	TKO (punches)	WEC 20	5 May 2006	1	1:57	Lemoore, California, United States	
Loss	2–2	Ed Herman	Decision (unanimous)	SF 9: Respect	26 March 2005	3	5:00	Gresham, Oregon, United States	
Win	2–1	Justin Ellison	TKO (punches)	SF 5: Stadium	28 August 2004	1	N/A	Gresham, Oregon, United States	
Win	1–1	Matt Horwich	Decision (unanimous)	SF 3: Dome	17 April 2004	3	5:00	Gresham, Oregon, United States	
Loss	0–1	Eric Schwartz	TKO (punches and elbows)	WEC 3	7 June 2002	2	3:33	Lemoore, California, United States	

== Submission grappling record ==
Result	Opponent	Method	Event	Date	Round	Time	Notes
Win	(United States) Anthony Smith	Decision (unanimous)	UFC Fight Pass Invitational 4	29 June 2023	3	4:00	
Draw	(United States) Jake Shields	Draw	Quintet Ultra	12 December 2019	1	8:00	
Loss	(Brazil) Gabriel Vella	Points	ADCC Brasil trials (Over 99 kg)	2011			
Win	(Brazil) Armando Sapo	Submission	ADCC Brasil trials (Over 99 kg)	2011			
Win	(Brazil) Salvador Minnit	Submission	ADCC Brasil trials (Over 99 kg)	2011			
Win	(Brazil) Jorge Bezerra	Points	ADCC Brasil trials(Over 99 kg)	2011			
Loss	(Brazil) Vinny Magalhães	Submission (armbar)	ADCC Barcelona (Under 99 kg)	2009			
Loss	(United States) Gerardi Rinaldi	Points	ADCC Barcelona (Under 99 kg)	2009			
Win	(United States) Dean Lister	Points	ADCC Barcelona (Under 99 kg)	2009			
Win	(Finland) Vesa Vuori	Points	ADCC Barcelona (Under 99 kg)	2009			
Win	(Brazil) Leonardo Chocolate	Submission (rear-naked choke)	ADCC Brasil trials (Under 99 kg)	2009			
Win	(Brazil) Renato Ferreira	Points	ADCC Brasil trials (Under 99 kg)	2009			

== Boxing record ==
=== Professional ===
1 fight	1 win	0 losses
By decision	1	0

No.	Result	Record	Opponent	Type	Round, time	Date	Location	Notes
1	Win	1–0	Maurício Rua	DEC	8	29 Aug 2026	Mercado Livre Arena Pacaembu, São Paulo, Brazil	

== Main event bouts ==
UFC 283	21 January 2023	Jeunesse Arena	Rio de Janeiro, Brazil
UFC 275	12 June 2022	Singapore Indoor Stadium	Kallang, Singapore
UFC 267	30 October 2021	Etihad Arena	Abu Dhabi, United Arab Emirates
UFC Fight Night: Santos vs. Teixeira	8 November 2020	UFC APEX	Las Vegas, Nevada, U.S.
UFC Fight Night: Smith vs. Teixeira	13 May 2020	VyStar Veterans Memorial Arena	Jacksonville, Florida, U.S.
UFC Fight Night: Gustafsson vs. Teixeira	28 May 2017	Ericsson Globe	Stockholm, Sweden
UFC on Fox: Teixeira vs. Evans	16 April 2016	Amalie Arena	Tampa, Florida, U.S.
UFC Fight Night: Teixeira vs. Saint Preux	8 August 2015	Bridgestone Arena	Nashville, Tennessee, U.S.
UFC 172: Jones vs. Teixeira	26 April 2014	Baltimore Arena	Baltimore, Maryland, U.S.
UFC Fight Night: Teixeira vs. Bader	4 September 2013	Mineirinho Arena	Belo Horizonte, Brazil

== Pay-per-view bouts ==
No.	Event	Fight	Date	Venue	City	PPV Buys
1.	UFC 172	Jones vs. Teixeira	26 April 2014	Baltimore Arena	Baltimore, Maryland, United States	350,000
2.	UFC 275	Teixeira vs. Procházka	12 June 2022	Singapore Indoor Stadium	Kallang, Singapore	Not Disclosed
3.	UFC 283	Teixeira vs. Hill	21 January 2023	Jeunesse Arena	Rio de Janeiro, Brazil	Not Disclosed

== See also ==
- List of male mixed martial artists

Awards and achievements
Preceded by Jan Błachowicz	16th UFC Light Heavyweight Champion; 30 October 2021 – 11 June 2022	Succeeded by Jiří Procházka
