= The Pit (mixed martial arts) =

Professional mixed martial arts association and training camp

- Est.: 1986
- Founded by: John Hackleman
- Primary owners: John Hackleman
- Primary trainers: John Hackleman; Rick Metzler; Chuck Liddell; Luke Riddering; Joe Lynch; Glover Teixeira; Justin Lucas; Eric Umali; Castle Williams
- Past titleholders: Chuck Liddell Glover Teixeira
- Prominent fighters: Chuck Liddell (UFC); Glover Teixeira (UFC); Court McGee (UFC); Ramsey Nijem (UFC); Antonio Banuelos (DREAM); Scott Lighty (Strikeforce)
- Training facilities: Arroyo Grande, California; Henderson, Nevada; Malibu, California; Atascadero, California; Camarillo, California
- Website: The Pit Headquarters

The Pit is a professional mixed martial arts association and training camp operating in Arroyo Grande, California; with a branch in Henderson, Nevada, and affiliate schools throughout the United States. Founded in 1986 by John Hackleman, The Pit fighters have competed in various promotions such as the UFC, WEC and DREAM. The Pit became world famous when Pit black belt Chuck Liddell became the UFC light-heavyweight champion.

== History ==
In 1986, The Pit was founded in Woodland Hills, California as a training gym teaching the art of Kajukenbo, which is now known as Hawaiian Kempo. Founder, John Hackleman started the school as a means to teach a more straight forward, no-nonsense approach to martial arts. Initially, The Pit was intended for training serious fighters only and employed a logo depicting a Grim Reaper-like fighter. When The Pit opened to the general public, Hackleman renamed the school "KuZen" in order to attract kids and families. The Pit currently operates out of Arroyo Grande, California. It gained worldwide notoriety when Chuck Liddell became UFC Light-Heavyweight Champion.

=== The Pit boss ===
In 1985, Hackleman moved from Hawaii to California and renamed his martial arts style, Hawaiian Kempo. The Pit is the only Hawaiian Kempo school that uses the Ke-m-po spelling, instead of the more commonly used Ke-n-po. Hackleman describes his style as more hardcore than other Hawaiian Kenpo schools. He gave his school the style name "KuZen," a word derived from mix "Ku," the Hawaiian god of war, and "Zen," for Zen Buddhism: this name was intended to attract children and families.

== Training style ==
Hawaiian Kempo (a.k.a. Kajukenbo) blends kenpo, karate, judo, jiu-jitsu, boxing and wrestling. The Pit places a heavy emphasis on "CrossPit": The Pit's specialty strength and conditioning fitness program developed in the vein of CrossFit. In order to add more time for a fitness-oriented curriculum aimed at producing well-conditioned athletes, training katas were eliminated from the original KaJuKenBo formula. Practicality and usability are emphasized in the areas of striking and grappling. Bag training is emphasized both standing and on the ground.

Since the school began accepting non-fighters, they train students from ages three years and up. The school uses three separate belt systems; one for ages three to eight, nine through 13, and adults.

== Notable fighters who have trained at The Pit ==
- Chuck Liddell (UFC)
- Tito Ortiz (UFC)
- Jake Shields (UFC, Strikeforce)
- Ramsey Nijem (UFC)
- Tony DeSouza (UFC)
- Bobby Southworth (Strikeforce)
- Tim Kennedy (UFC, Strikeforce)
- Jason Von Flue (UFC, Strikeforce)
- Court McGee (UFC)
- Scott Adams (UFC)
- Glover Teixeira (UFC)
- Steven Siler (UFC)
- Antonio Banuelos (UFC, WEC, DREAM)
- Scott Lighty (Strikeforce)
