= John Hackleman =

American mixed martial arts coach

Personal information
- Born: November 21, 1959 (age 66) New York City

Boxing career
- Weight class: Light heavyweight

Boxing record
- Total fights: 13
- Wins: 8
- Win by KO: 7
- Losses: 4
- Draws: 1

John Hackleman (born November 21, 1959, in New York) is an American mixed martial arts (MMA) coach who founded The Pit and former professional boxer. He is best known for training UFC Light Heavyweight Champions Chuck Liddell and Glover Teixeira.

== Early life and martial arts career ==
Hackleman was born November 21, 1959, in New York City to James and Nancy Hackleman. In 1966 Hackleman and his family moved to Honolulu due to his father's job.

At the age of nine, Hackleman began studying Judo and Shotokan Karate to defend himself on the streets. At the age of ten Hackleman started studying Kajukenbo which he considered his true calling. According to Hackleman, Adriano Directo Emperado awarded him the rank of great-grandmaster in Kajukenbo.

Hackleman started his fighting career at the age of 14 where he started as amateur in boxing and kickboxing. Hackleman graduated from Kalani High School where during his time there he became a Golden Gloves boxer and won many martial arts tournaments.

In 1979 Hackleman enlisted in the Army in response to the Iran hostage crisis. He spent three years as a member of the Army boxing team, during which time he won the state and regional Golden Gloves titles. He also participated in no holds barred bouts working with figures such as Benny Urquidez, Peter Cunningham and Joe Lewis. After leaving the Army, Hackleman became a professional boxer until 1985 where he was managed by Don King. Hackleman had children early and knew his boxing career wouldn't last forever so he started looking for another career.

== Coaching career ==
Hackleman relocated to California in 1985. Inspired by one of his trainers who was a respiratory therapist, Hackleman went back to school to become a registered nurse. Hackleman who was working as respiratory therapist in a hospital found it difficult to go to the gym every day while working full-time. That year he decided to set up a gym in his garage in Woodland Hills where his friends from the hospital would come over to workout. This gym would become known as The Pit which got its name after one of Hackleman's colleagues stated the place was so small, "its like training in a pit".

Due to increased popularity, The Pit outgrew the garage and moved to a backyard. Hackleman and his wife changed their jobs to be on part-time basis so they could manage the gym which had little cost. Hackleman created his own style Hawaiian Kempo which was taught at the gym. It would use what was proven to work while discarding things that didn't.

In 1990 Hackleman moved to Arroyo Grande where The Pit was now a 800 square foot building in the backyard of his new home. It was here that Hackleman would meet Chuck Liddell who Hackleman has called his best student. Since then the Pit has expanded further and has a second location in Las Vegas.

In 2000 Hackleman implemented CrossFit-style programming into workouts at The Pit. Hackleman aimed to have more drilling and less sparring to make training safer.

In May 2009 Hackleman got in a verbal dispute with Dana White when White made the unprecedented decision to retire Liddell following his loss to Mauricio Rua at UFC 97. Hackleman stated it was up to Liddell to choose when to retire to which White responded Hackleman was just looking for another payday from his fighter. Hackleman said he never said he wanted Liddell to fight again but it was Liddell's choice to make.

Liddell announced on April 14, 2018 that he was coming out of retirement to target third fight with Tito Ortiz. Hackleman stated that, while he did not want Liddell to fight anymore, he would still be there to support him. In November 2018, Hackleman called the result of Liddell vs. Ortiz 3 a travesty where Tito Ortiz won via first-round knockout.

In January 2023 Hackleman said he was retiring from cornering fighters after he tried to call off the fight between his student Glover Teixeira and Jamahal Hill at UFC 283. Hackleman wanted to call off the fight in the fourth round and if he was the chief corner, referee Marc Goddard would have waved off the action in favor of Hill. It turned out that not stopping the fight was the right call as Teixeira managed to take Hill down. Hackleman stated he was concerned about the safety of his fighters and he does not regret stopping the fights early.

== Personal life ==
Hackleman is married. His son John Hackleman Jr. was an MMA fighter.

Hackleman's heroes are Bruce Lee and Mas Oyama.

Hackleman emphasizes safety in fighting and admits he gets nervous before his fighters compete because he wants to keep them safe.

== Notable students ==
- Chuck Liddell
- Glover Teixeira
- Tim Kennedy
- Court McGee
- Antonio Banuelos
- Ramsey Nijem
- Jason Von Flue
