= UFC 47 =

UFC mixed martial arts event in 2004

UFC 47: It's On!
- The poster for UFC 47: It's On!
- Promotion: Ultimate Fighting Championship
- Date: April 2, 2004
- Venue: Mandalay Bay Events Center
- City: Paradise, Nevada
- Attendance: 11,437
- Total gate: $1,444,020
- Buyrate: 105,000
- Total purse: 333,000

Event chronology
| UFC 46: Supernatural | UFC 47: It's On! | UFC 48: Payback |

UFC 47: It's On! was a mixed martial arts event held by the Ultimate Fighting Championship on April 2, 2004, at the Mandalay Bay Events Center in the Las Vegas suburb of Paradise, Nevada. The event was broadcast live on pay-per-view, and later released on DVD.

== History ==
Headlining the card was the match between Chuck Liddell and Tito Ortiz.

The title "It's On!" refers to Chuck Liddell and Tito Ortiz's long-running negotiations leading up to the fight. Fans had been awaiting the fight for more than a year, and while both fighters had their own stories as to why it took so long, the fight finally took place in 2004. Ortiz claims that as friends and former training partners, he and Liddell had made a pact never to fight. Liddell claims there was no such pact, that he would fight anyone anytime, and accused Ortiz of ducking the fight.

A match-up between Tim Sylvia and Andrei Arlovski for the then-vacant UFC Heavyweight Championship was scheduled for the event, but Sylvia was pulled due to a recurrence of positive drug samples just a day before the event. Arlovski was re-booked on short notice in a non-title fight against Wesley Correira, who was pulled from a scheduled main card fight with Mike Kyle to replace Sylvia. Wes Sims stepped in on a day's notice to face Mike Kyle at this event as well. The Sylvia–Arlovski match-up was finally re-booked for the Interim Heavyweight Championship at UFC 51 in February 2005.

This was the first card to feature "On The Mat" with Marc Laimon, a brief instructional video demonstrating the triangle choke.

== Results ==
Main Card
| Weight class | | | | Method | Round | Time | Notes |
|---|---|---|---|---|---|---|---|
| Light Heavyweight | Chuck Liddell | def. | Tito Ortiz | KO (punches) | 2 | 0:38 |
| Welterweight | Chris Lytle | def. | Tiki Ghosn | Submission (bulldog choke) | 2 | 1:55 |
| Lightweight | Yves Edwards | def. | Hermes França | Decision (split) (29–28, 29–28, 28–29) | 3 | 5:00 |
| Heavyweight | Andrei Arlovski | def. | Wesley Correira | TKO (punches) | 2 | 1:15 |
| Welterweight | Nick Diaz | def. | Robbie Lawler | KO (punch) | 2 | 1:31 |
| Heavyweight | Mike Kyle | def. | Wes Sims | KO (punch) | 1 | 4:59 |
Preliminary card
| Heavyweight | Jonathan Wiezorek | def. | Wade Shipp | TKO (punches) | 1 | 4:40 |
| Lightweight | Genki Sudo | def. | Mike Brown | Submission (triangle armbar) | 1 | 3:31 |

== Reported payout ==
The total fighter payroll for UFC 47 was $333,000.

- Tito Ortiz: $125,000
- Chuck Liddell: $100,000 (including $50,000 win bonus)
- Andrei Arlovski: $23,000 (including $8,000 win bonus)
- Genki Sudo: $16,000 (including $8,000 win bonus)
- Wes "Cabbage" Correira: $12,000
- Yves Edwards: $12,000 (including $6,000 win bonus)
- Robbie Lawler: $8,000
- Hermes Franca: $6,000
- Nick Diaz: $6,000 (including $3,000 win bonus)
- Mike Kyle: $6,000 (including $3,000 win bonus)
- Wes Sims: $5,000
- Chris Lytle: $4,000 (including $2,000 win bonus)
- Jonathan Wiezorek: $4,000 (including $2,000 win bonus)
- Mike Brown: $2,000
- Tiki Ghosn: $2,000
- Wade Shipp: $2,000

== Encyclopedia awards ==
The following fighters were honored in the October 2011 book titled UFC Encyclopedia.

- Fight of the Night: Chuck Liddell vs. Tito Ortiz
- Knockout of the Night: Nick Diaz
- Submission of the Night: Genki Sudo

== See also ==
- Ultimate Fighting Championship
- List of UFC champions
- List of UFC events
- 2004 in UFC
