= Sobrália =

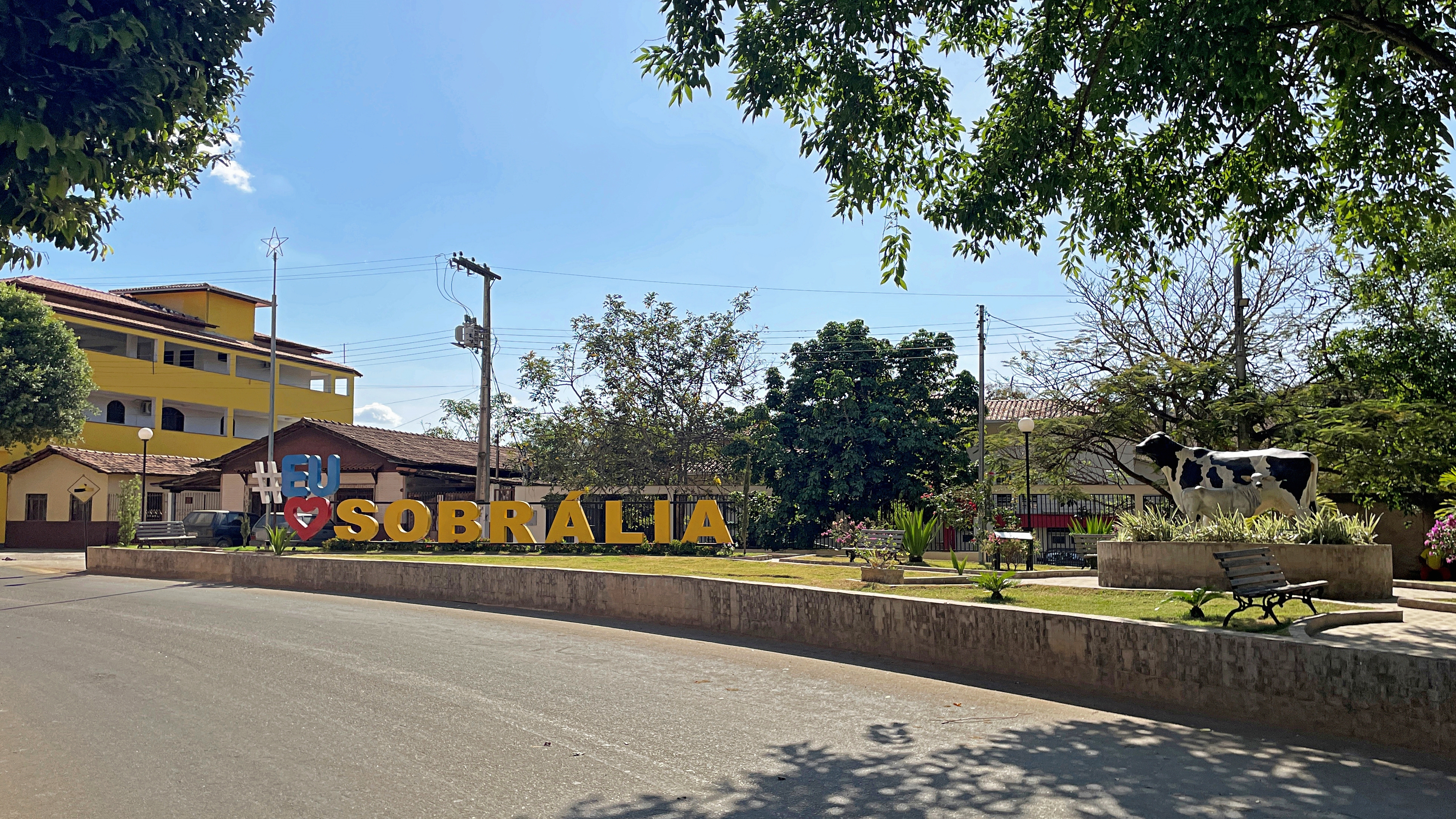
- "Eu Amo Sobrália" ("I love Sobrália") in the Ivo Teodoro de Sousa Square

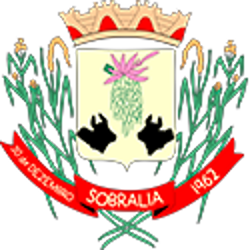
- Coat of arms

- Location in Brazil

- Location within Brazil
- Coordinates: 19°14′16″S 42°05′52″W
- Country: Brazil
- Region: Southeast
- State: Minas Gerais
- Settled: 1900s
- Incorporated (district): 1943
- Incorporated (municipality): 1962

Government
  - Mayor: Maria das Neves Beltrame Andrade

Area
  - Total: 206,970 km^{2} (79,910 sq mi)
- Elevation: 270 m (890 ft)

Population (2022 Census)
  - Total: 5,137
  - Estimate (2025): 5,140
- Time zone: UTC−3 (BRT)
- HDI (2000): 0.685
- Website: sobralia.mg.gov.br

Sobrália is a municipality in Brazil in the state of Minas Gerais. Its population in 2025 was estimated to be 5,140 inhabitants. The name Sobrália came from a local Native American tribe referring to the flowers called sobralia.

This city is where former UFC Light Heavyweight Champion Glover Teixeira was born.

It is also the ancestral home of Danbury, Connecticut City Councilman Farley Santos whose maternal Grandfather, Miguel Pereira Santiago was the first Mayor of Sobralia. His paternal Grandfather, Geraldo Jose “Duquinha” Viana was also a 2 term Mayor of Sobralia.

== History ==
The first settlers arrived in the beginning of the 20th century. The city was incorporated as a district of Tarumirim on December 31, 1943, by state law no. 1058. It became a municipality on December 30, 1962, by the signing of state law no. 2764.

== See also ==
- List of municipalities in Minas Gerais
