= UFC 283 =

Mixed martial arts event in 2023

UFC 283: Teixeira vs. Hill
- The poster for UFC 283: Teixeira vs. Hill
- Promotion: Ultimate Fighting Championship
- Date: January 21, 2023
- Venue: Jeunesse Arena
- City: Rio de Janeiro, Brazil
- Attendance: 13,604

Event chronology
UFC Fight Night: Strickland vs. Imavov	UFC 283: Teixeira vs. Hill	UFC Fight Night: Lewis vs. Spivac

UFC 283: Teixeira vs. Hill was a mixed martial arts event produced by the Ultimate Fighting Championship that took place on January 21, 2023, at the Jeunesse Arena in Rio de Janeiro, Brazil.

== Background ==
The event marked the promotion's return to Brazil for the first time since UFC Fight Night: Lee vs. Oliveira, which took place in Brasília in March 2020. That event took place behind closed doors (for the first time in the promotion's history) after Ibaneis Rocha, the governor of the Federal District (where Brasília is located), announced that large gatherings had been suspended due to the COVID-19 pandemic.

A UFC Light Heavyweight Championship bout for the vacant title between former champion Glover Teixeira and Jamahal Hill headlined the event. Teixeira was originally expected to compete at UFC 282 as a challenger in a rematch against then-champion Jiří Procházka, but Procházka pulled out and vacated the title after a serious shoulder injury. Teixeira subsequently refused a replacement fight against Magomed Ankalaev, which prompted the UFC to change the original co-main event between former champion Jan Błachowicz and Ankalaev into the new title fight for the vacant belt. After that contest ended in a split draw, the organization decided to book Teixeira and Hill, who was scheduled to headline an event against former title challenger Anthony Smith in early March. Smith was expected to serve as an alternate for the title bout. However, he weighed in at 206.5 pounds on his second attempt and was unable to compete if necessary.

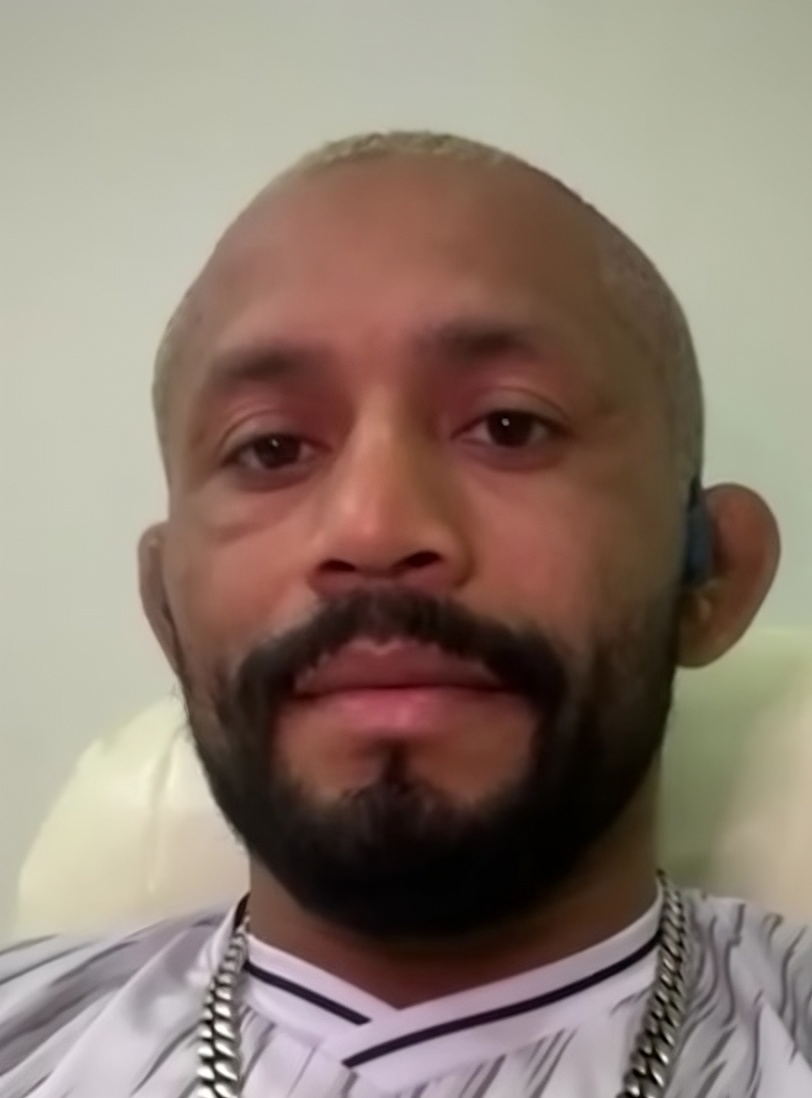
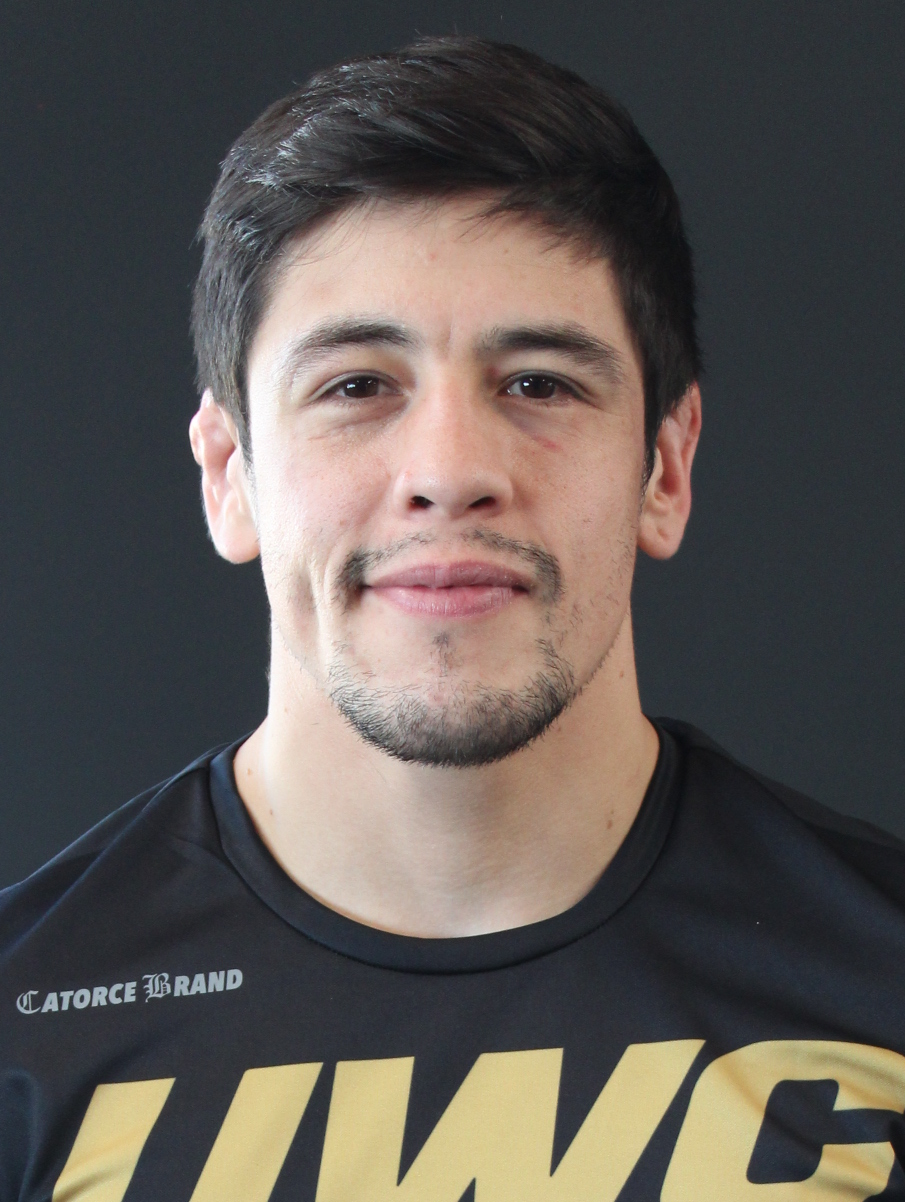
This was the UFC's first-ever tetralogy fight. Figueiredo (left) faced Moreno (right) for the fourth straight time, while the latter fought Kai Kara-France in his latest bout after the original trilogy.

A UFC Flyweight Championship unification tetralogy bout between current two-time champion Deiveson Figueiredo and former champion/current interim title holder Brandon Moreno took place at the event. The pairing first met at UFC 256 on December 12, 2020, which ended in a majority draw (Figueiredo retained the title). Their second meeting took place at UFC 263 on June 12, 2021, where Moreno captured the title by submission in the third round. Their third meeting took place at UFC 270 on January 22, 2022, where Figueiredo regained the title by unanimous decision. Alexandre Pantoja served as backup and potential replacement for this fight.

A women's featherweight bout between Josiane Nunes and Zarah Fairn took place at the event. They were originally scheduled to meet at UFC on ESPN: Whittaker vs. Gastelum in April 2021, but on the day of the weigh-ins Fairn weighed in at 147 pounds, eight pounds over the pre-established limit of 139 pounds (the bout was originally set for the women's bantamweight division, but was shifted to a catchweight prior to the start of the weigh-ins). The bout was cancelled due to the weight discrepancy, as Nunes weighed in at 136 pounds.

A heavyweight bout between Shamil Abdurakhimov and Jailton Almeida took place at the event. They were previously scheduled to meet at UFC 279 and UFC 280 but Abdurakhimov withdrew both times due to visa issues and for undisclosed reasons respectively.

Guram Kutateladze was expected to face Thiago Moisés in a lightweight bout at this event. However, Kutateladze pulled out in early January for undisclosed reasons. He was replaced by promotional newcomer Melquizael Costa.

A middleweight bout between Brad Tavares and former LFA Middleweight Champion Gregory Rodrigues was expected to take place at the event. However, Tavares withdrew from the bout due to an injury. He was replaced by promotional newcomer Brunno Ferreira.

During the event's broadcast, the inaugural and former two-time UFC Featherweight Champion José Aldo (also former WEC Featherweight Champion) was announced as the next "modern wing" UFC Hall of Fame inductee.

== Results ==
Main card
Weight class				Method	Round	Time	Notes
Light Heavyweight	Jamahal Hill	def.	Glover Teixeira	Decision (unanimous) (50–44, 50–44, 50–44)	5	5:00	(Note: For the vacant UFC Light Heavyweight Championship.)
Flyweight	Brandon Moreno (ic)	def.	Deiveson Figueiredo (c)	TKO (doctor stoppage)	3	5:00	(Note: For the UFC Flyweight Championship.)
Welterweight	Gilbert Burns	def.	Neil Magny	Submission (arm-triangle choke)	1	4:15
Women's Flyweight	Jéssica Andrade	def.	Lauren Murphy	Decision (unanimous) (30–25, 30–25, 30–26)	3	5:00
Light Heavyweight	Johnny Walker	def.	Paul Craig	TKO (punches)	1	2:16
Preliminary card (ABC / ESPN / ESPN+)
Light Heavyweight	Ihor Potieria	def.	Maurício Rua	TKO (punches)	1	4:05
Middleweight	Brunno Ferreira	def.	Gregory Rodrigues	KO (punch)	1	4:13
Lightweight	Thiago Moisés	def.	Melquizael Costa	Submission (face crank)	2	4:05
Welterweight	Gabriel Bonfim	def.	Mounir Lazzez	Submission (guillotine choke)	1	0:49
Early preliminary card (ESPN+ / UFC Fight Pass)
Heavyweight	Jailton Almeida	def.	Shamil Abdurakhimov	TKO (punches)	2	2:56
Bantamweight	Cody Stamann	def.	Luan Lacerda	Decision (unanimous) (29–28, 29–28, 29–28)	3	5:00
Lightweight	Ismael Bonfim	def.	Terrance McKinney	KO (flying knee)	2	2:17
Welterweight	Nicolas Dalby	def.	Warlley Alves	Decision (split) (29–28, 28–29, 29–28)	3	5:00
Women's Featherweight	Josiane Nunes	def.	Zarah Fairn	Decision (unanimous) (29–28, 29–28, 29–28)	3	5:00
Bantamweight	Daniel Marcos	def.	Saimon Oliveira	KO (knee to the body and punches)	2	2:18

== Bonus awards ==
The following fighters received $50,000 bonuses.

- Fight of the Night: Jamahal Hill vs. Glover Teixeira
- Performance of the Night: Jailton Almeida and Ismael Bonfim

== See also ==
- List of UFC events
- List of current UFC fighters
- 2023 in UFC
