= Jamahal Hill =

American mixed martial artist (born 1991)

- Born: Jamahal Alexander Hill; May 19, 1991 (age 35); Chicago, Illinois, U.S.
- Other names: Sweet Dreams
- Height: 6 ft 4 in (193 cm)
- Weight: 205 lb (93 kg; 14 st 9 lb)
- Division: Light Heavyweight
- Reach: 79 in (201 cm)
- Fighting out of: Grand Rapids, Michigan, U.S.
- Team: Black Lion Brazilian Jiu-Jitsu (2010–present)
- Rank: Brown belt in Brazilian Jiu-Jitsu
- Years active: 2017–present

Mixed martial arts record
- Total: 17
- Wins: 12
- By knockout: 7
- By decision: 5
- Losses: 4
- By knockout: 3
- By decision: 1
- No contests: 1

Other information
- Mixed martial arts record from Sherdog

Jamahal Alexander Hill (/dʒəˈmɑːl/; born May 19, 1991) is an American professional mixed martial artist. He currently competes in the Light Heavyweight division of the Ultimate Fighting Championship (UFC), where he is a former UFC Light Heavyweight Champion. As of June 20, 2026, he is #5 in the Meta UFC light heavyweight rankings.

== Early life ==
Hill moved to Grand Rapids when he was 12. He graduated from Rogers High School in Wyoming, Michigan. After passing on a basketball career at Davenport University, Hill started competing in professional mixed martial arts in 2017.

== Mixed martial arts career ==
=== Early career ===
Hill started his professional career in 2017 with a 5–0 record, four of the five fights coming under the KnockOut Promotions banner. In just his fourth professional fight Hill defeated future UFC fighter Dequan Townsend despite Townsend having twenty-six pro appearances prior to that bout.

Hill then received the call to appear on Dana White's Contender Series 21 back in 2019, where Hill defeated opponent Alexander Poppeck via second-round ground and pound, earning his UFC contract.

=== Ultimate Fighting Championship ===
Hill made his UFC debut against Darko Stošić on January 25, 2020, at UFC Fight Night 166. He won the fight via unanimous decision.

Hill faced Klidson Abreu on May 30, 2020, at UFC on ESPN: Woodley vs. Burns. He initially won the fight via technical knockout in the first round, but the fight was later overturned on September 3 because Hill tested positive for marijuana. He was suspended six months and fined 15% of his fight purse.

Hill faced Ovince Saint Preux on December 5, 2020, at UFC on ESPN 19. At the weigh-ins, former interim UFC Light Heavyweight Championship challenger Ovince Saint Preux weighed in at 207.5 pounds, one and a half pounds over the light heavyweight non-title fight limit. The bout proceeded at a catchweight and Saint Preux was fined 20% of his individual purse, which went to Hill. Hill won the fight via technical knockout in the second round.

Hill was scheduled to face Paul Craig on March 20, 2021 UFC on ESPN 21. However, on March 10, Hill withdrew from the bout after testing positive for COVID-19. The pairing with Craig remained intact and took place on June 12, 2021, at UFC 263. After having his elbow dislocated early in the fight via an armbar from Craig, Hill lost the fight via technical knockout in the first round.

Hill was scheduled to face Jimmy Crute on October 2, 2021 UFC Fight Night 193. However, in early September, the bout was rescheduled two months later at UFC on ESPN: Font vs. Aldo. He won the fight via knockout in the first round. This win earned him the Performance of the Night award.

In his first UFC main event, Hill faced Johnny Walker on February 19, 2022, at UFC Fight Night: Walker vs. Hill. He won the fight via knockout in the first round. The win earned Hill his second Performance of the Night bonus award.

Hill faced Thiago Santos on August 6, 2022, at UFC on ESPN 40. He won the fight via technical knockout. This fight earned him the Fight of the Night award.

==== UFC Light Heavyweight Champion ====
===== Teixeira vs. Hill =====
Hill was scheduled to face Anthony Smith on March 11, 2023, at UFC Fight Night 221. However, Hill was pulled from the bout after being rebooked to headline UFC 283 for the vacant UFC Light Heavyweight Championship against Glover Teixeira on January 21, 2023. He won the bout and title via unanimous decision, and in the process became the first Dana White's Contender Series alumn to win a UFC championship. This fight earned him the Fight of the Night award.

==== Injury and vacating the title ====
On July 14, 2023, Hill announced via his YouTube page that he had ruptured his Achilles tendon playing a fighter basketball game during UFC International Fight Week, and that he would be relinquishing the UFC Light Heavyweight title.

==== Pereira vs Hill ====
Hill faced Alex Pereira for the UFC Light Heavyweight Championship in the main event of UFC 300 on April 13, 2024. He lost the fight by knockout in the first round.

==== Post championship ====
Hill was scheduled to face Khalil Rountree Jr. at UFC 303 on June 29, 2024. However, Rountree was forced to withdraw from the event due to taking a banned substance, and was replaced by Carlos Ulberg, who was eventually replaced by Roman Dolidze. Hill, in turn withdrew due to injury and was replaced by Anthony Smith.

Hill faced former UFC Light Heavyweight Champion Jiří Procházka on January 18, 2025 at UFC 311. He lost the fight by technical knockout in the third round.

Hill was scheduled to face former UFC Light Heavyweight Championship challenger Khalil Rountree Jr. on April 26, 2025 in the main event at UFC on ESPN 66. However, Hill had to withdraw due to a leg injury, so the bout was scrapped. The bout was rescheduled and headlined UFC on ABC 8 on June 21, 2025. Hill lost the fight by unanimous decision.

== Personal life ==
Hill has six children, who ranged in age from 2 to 14 years old, as of June 2021. On November 28, 2023, Hill was arrested in Kent County, Michigan on a charge of aggravated domestic violence after allegedly assaulting his brother on the night of November 27. He was later released from custody after posting bail. Hill's first court hearing was scheduled for January 2024.

== Championships and accomplishments ==
- Ultimate Fighting Championship
  - UFC Light Heavyweight Championship (One time)
    - Second highest significant strike differential in UFC championship history (+157 vs. Glover Teixeira)
    - Second most significant strikes landed in a title fight (232 vs. Glover Teixeira)
    - The first Dana White's Contender Series alum to become a UFC champion
  - Fight of the Night (Two times) vs. Thiago Santos and Glover Teixeira
  - Performance of the Night (Two times) vs. Jimmy Crute and Johnny Walker
  - Second most significant strikes landed-per-minute in UFC Light Heavyweight division history (6.85)
  - Second highest striking differential in UFC Light Heavyweight division history (3.4)
  - Most significant strikes landed in a UFC Light Heavyweight bout (232) vs. Glover Teixeira
    - Most distant strikes landed in a UFC Light Heavyweight bout (188) vs. Glover Teixeira
    - Most significant head strikes landed in a UFC Light Heavyweight bout (180) vs. Glover Teixeira
    - Second most significant strikes attempted in a UFC Light Heavyweight bout (402) vs. Glover Teixeira
    - Second most total strikes attempted in a UFC Light Heavyweight bout (419) vs. Glover Teixeira
    - Second most total head strikes landed in a UFC Light Heavyweight bout (190) vs. Glover Teixeira
  - UFC Honors Awards
    - 2023: President's Choice Fight of the Year Nominee vs. Glover Teixeira
  - UFC.com Awards
    - 2020: Ranked #6 Newcomer of the Year
    - 2022:Ranked #8 Fighter of the Year
    - 2023: Ranked #5 Fight of the Year vs. Glover Teixeira
- KnockOut Promotions
  - KOP Light Heavyweight Championship (One time)
- MMAjunkie.com
  - 2022 February Knockout of the Month vs. Johnny Walker
  - 2023 January Fight of the Month vs. Glover Teixeira
- MMA Fighting
  - 2022 Third Team MMA All-Star

== Mixed martial arts record ==
Professional record breakdown
17 matches	12 wins	4 losses
By knockout	7	3
By decision	5	1
No contests	1	

Res.	Record	Opponent	Method	Event	Date	Round	Time	Location	Notes
Loss	12–4 (1)	Khalil Rountree Jr.	Decision (unanimous)	UFC on ABC: Hill vs. Rountree Jr.	June 21, 2025	5	5:00	Baku, Azerbaijan	
Loss	12–3 (1)	Jiří Procházka	TKO (punches)	UFC 311	January 18, 2025	3	3:01	Inglewood, California, United States	
Loss	12–2 (1)	Alex Pereira	KO (punches)	UFC 300	April 13, 2024	1	3:14	Las Vegas, Nevada, United States	For the UFC Light Heavyweight Championship.
Win	12–1 (1)	Glover Teixeira	Decision (unanimous)	UFC 283	January 21, 2023	5	5:00	Rio de Janeiro, Brazil	Won the vacant UFC Light Heavyweight Championship. Fight of the Night. Later vacated the title due to injury.
Win	11–1 (1)	Thiago Santos	TKO (punches and elbows)	UFC on ESPN: Santos vs. Hill	August 6, 2022	4	2:31	Las Vegas, Nevada, United States	Fight of the Night.
Win	10–1 (1)	Johnny Walker	KO (punch)	UFC Fight Night: Walker vs. Hill	February 19, 2022	1	2:55	Las Vegas, Nevada, United States	Performance of the Night.
Win	9–1 (1)	Jimmy Crute	KO (punches)	UFC on ESPN: Font vs. Aldo	December 4, 2021	1	0:48	Las Vegas, Nevada, United States	Performance of the Night.
Loss	8–1 (1)	Paul Craig	TKO (elbows and punches)	UFC 263	June 12, 2021	1	1:59	Glendale, Arizona, United States	
Win	8–0 (1)	Ovince Saint Preux	TKO (punches)	UFC on ESPN: Hermansson vs. Vettori	December 5, 2020	2	3:37	Las Vegas, Nevada, United States	Catchweight (207.5 lb) bout; Saint Preux missed weight.
NC	7–0 (1)	Klidson Abreu	NC (overturned)	UFC on ESPN: Woodley vs. Burns	May 30, 2020	1	1:51	Las Vegas, Nevada, United States	Originally a TKO (knee to the body and punches) win for Hill; overturned after he tested positive for marijuana.
Win	7–0	Darko Stošić	Decision (unanimous)	UFC Fight Night: Blaydes vs. dos Santos	January 25, 2020	3	5:00	Raleigh, North Carolina, United States	
Win	6–0	Alexander Poppeck	TKO (punches and elbows)	Dana White's Contender Series 21	July 23, 2019	3	0:22	Las Vegas, Nevada, United States	
Win	5–0	William Vincent	TKO (retirement)	Lights Out Championship 2	February 16, 2019	1	5:00	Grand Rapids, Michigan, United States	Catchweight (225 lb) bout.
Win	4–0	Dequan Townsend	Decision (unanimous)	KnockOut Promotions 62	June 30, 2018	5	5:00	Grand Rapids, Michigan, United States	Won the KOP Light Heavyweight Championship.
Win	3–0	William Vincent	Decision (unanimous)	KnockOut Promotions 61	April 21, 2018	3	5:00	Grand Rapids, Michigan, United States	
Win	2–0	Mike Johnson	TKO (punches)	KnockOut Promotions 59	December 16, 2017	1	4:45	Grand Rapids, Michigan, United States	Light Heavyweight debut.
Win	1–0	Alex Davidson	Decision (unanimous)	KnockOut Promotions 58	September 30, 2017	3	5:00	Grand Rapids, Michigan, United States	Catchweight (215 lb) bout.

== Pay-per-view bouts ==
No.	Event	Fight	Date	Venue	City	PPV Buys
1.	UFC 283	Teixeira vs. Hill	January 21, 2023	Jeunesse Arena	Rio de Janeiro, Brazil	Not Disclosed
2.	UFC 300	Pereira vs. Hill	April 13, 2024	T-Mobile Arena	Las Vegas, Nevada, United States	Not Disclosed

== See also ==
- List of current UFC fighters
- List of Dana White's Contender Series alumni
- List of male mixed martial artists

Awards and achievements
Preceded by Jiří Procházka; Vacated	18th UFC Light Heavyweight Champion; January 21, 2023 – July 14, 2023	Vacant Title next held by Alex Pereira
