= Chuck Liddell =

American mixed martial arts fighter (born 1969)

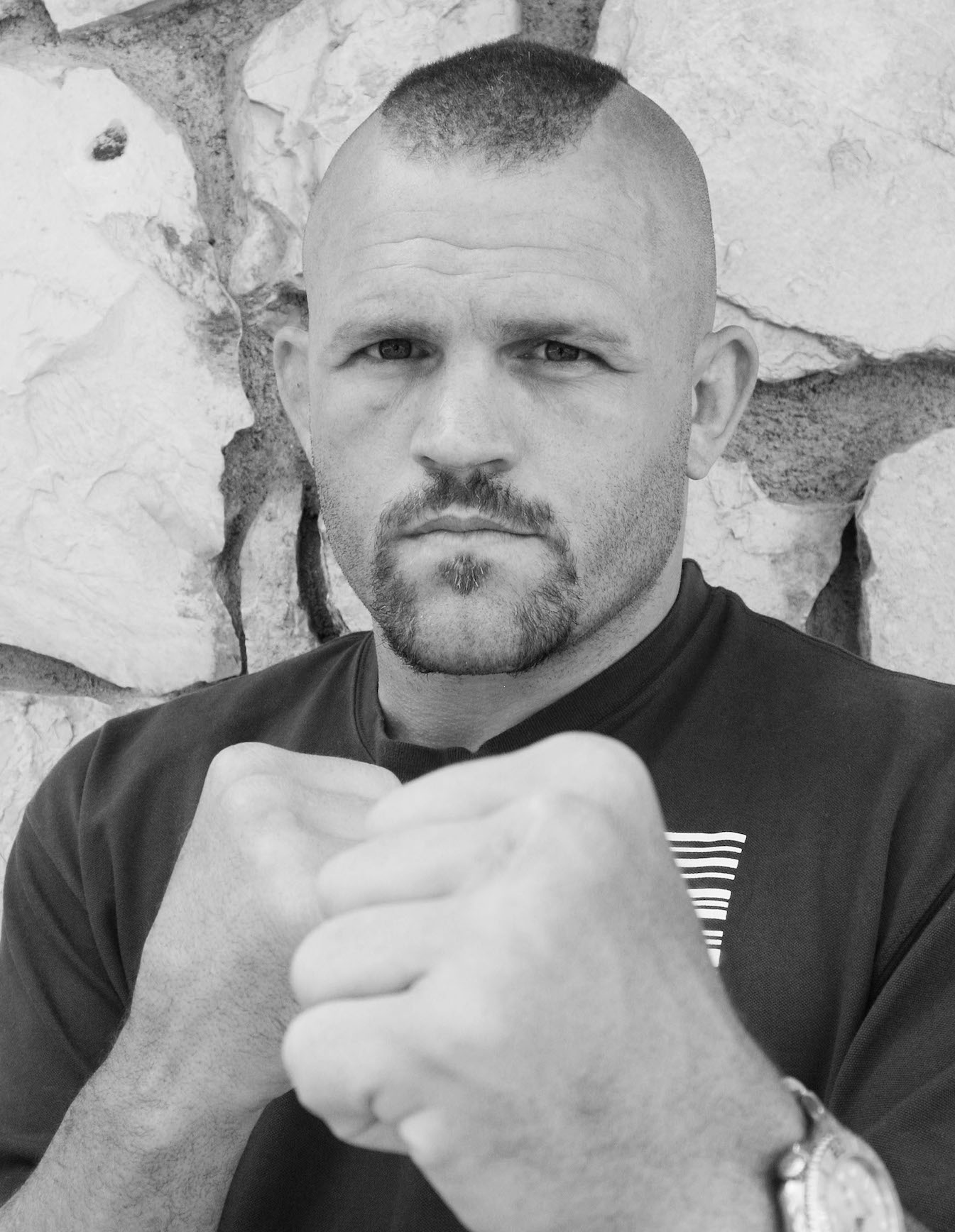
- Liddell in 2005
- Born: Charles David Liddell; December 17, 1969 (age 56); Santa Barbara, California, U.S.
- Other names: The Iceman
- Height: 6 ft 2 in (188 cm)
- Weight: 205 lb (93 kg; 14 st 9 lb)
- Division: Light Heavyweight (1998–2010); Heavyweight (2018)
- Reach: 76 1/2 in (194 cm)
- Fighting out of: San Luis Obispo, California, U.S.
- Trainer: John Hackleman; Ryan Langcake; John Lewis; Chuck Sandlin
- Rank: 8th Dan black belt in Kajukenbo; Black belt in Koei-Kan Karate; Purple belt in Brazilian jiu-jitsu
- Wrestling: NCAA Division I Wrestling
- Years active: 1998–2010, 2018 (MMA)

Kickboxing record
- Total: 22
- Wins: 20
- By knockout: 16
- Losses: 2

Mixed martial arts record
- Total: 30
- Wins: 21
- By knockout: 13
- By submission: 1
- By decision: 7
- Losses: 9
- By knockout: 7
- By submission: 1
- By decision: 1

Other information
- University: California Polytechnic State University
- Website: chuckliddell.com
- Mixed martial arts record from Sherdog

Charles David Liddell (born December 17, 1969) is an American former professional mixed martial artist. A professional competitor from 1998 to 2018, Liddell is a former UFC Light Heavyweight Champion (from 2005 to 2007) and is widely credited, along with fellow UFC fighter Randy Couture, with helping bring MMA into the mainstream of American sports and entertainment. Known as "The Iceman", Liddell achieved a 16–7 MMA record in the UFC, and an overall MMA record of 21–9, with 13 of his wins coming by way of knockout. He also achieved a 20–2 record in kickboxing, with 16 of his wins coming by way of knockout, and won two national amateur championships. He retired in late 2010, then came out of retirement for one bout in 2018, in a loss to rival Tito Ortiz. On July 10, 2009, Liddell was inducted into the UFC Hall of Fame.

== Early life ==
Born in Santa Barbara, California, Liddell was raised by his single mother and maternal grandfather, who taught Liddell and his siblings boxing techniques from a very young age. Liddell began studying Karate at the age of 12; the tattoo on his scalp reads "Koei-Kan" (幸栄館).

While growing up in Santa Barbara, he often frequented the Del Playa Drive, a street popular for parties in the UCSB college town of Isla Vista. As Liddell wrote in his book Iceman: My Fighting Life, he often found himself in fights with drunk college students older than him.

In high school, Liddell was a four-year starter on the football team at San Marcos High School, playing center and linebacker, and he also excelled at wrestling. In college, he wrestled at Cal Poly, where he attended from 1988 to 1993, and graduated with a bachelor's degree in business/accounting in 1995. Liddell was inducted into the Cal Poly Hall of Fame in 2009.

== Mixed martial arts career ==
Liddell competed as an amateur in both folkstyle wrestling and kickboxing. He wrestled for Cal Poly from 1988 to 1993 and compiled an amateur kickboxing record of 20 wins (16 KOs) and 2 losses (becoming a two-time national amateur champion) before transitioning to mixed martial arts.

=== UFC ===
==== Early success ====
Liddell made his UFC debut in 1998 during UFC 17 in Mobile, Alabama with a decision victory over Noe Hernandez. In his next bout, he faced Brazilian fighter Jose "Pele" Landi-Johns at an International Vale Tudo Championship event in São Paulo, Brazil, which was bare-knuckle. Despite being a heavy underdog in his opponent's home country, Liddell dominated the vale tudo fighter on the feet, and won via decision. After a technical submission loss to top contender Jeremy Horn shortly after, Liddell began establishing his reputation as a top contender with dominant victories over Kevin Randleman, Murilo Bustamante, Vitor Belfort, Amar Suloev, Jeff Monson, and Renato Sobral. Liddell was also the first UFC fighter to fight in Pride, where he represented the organization against fellow kickboxer Guy Mezger, knocking him unconscious.

===== Liddell vs. Couture =====
By 2002, Liddell was considered the #1 contender for the UFC Light Heavyweight Championship, with growing popularity and support from his fans. The UFC tried to arrange a title bout with then-champion Tito Ortiz, but Ortiz cited scheduling conflicts.

To force Ortiz's hand, they created an interim light heavyweight championship and matched Liddell with Greco-Roman wrestler and former heavyweight champion "The Natural" Randy Couture at UFC 43. Couture neutralized Liddell's hooks with straight punches and eventually began taking "The Iceman" down at will. Couture eventually gained full mount and forced a referee stoppage due to a barrage of punches.

===== Pride Grand Prix Tournament against Overeem/Jackson =====
After his defeat to Couture, Liddell entered the Pride 2003 Middleweight Grand Prix tournament as the official UFC representative. Liddell defeated Alistair Overeem in the first round of the tournament. In the action-packed bout, Liddell was getting out-landed by the taller, quicker and more technical striking of Overeem; later in the round Liddell landed an overhand punch to the head of Overeem, sending him staggering into the ropes. Liddell then rushed in with knees and straight rights and knocked Overeem out at the end of the first round.

In the next round, Liddell was eliminated by Rampage Jackson. In the first round of his fight with Jackson, Liddell landed shots as he found his distance but Jackson countered with powerful strikes, rocking Liddell numerous times. In the second round, Jackson continued to out-land Liddell with big punches, but could not finish him. Later in the second round a visibly exhausted Liddell was taken down and received a barrage of punches from the ground. His corner threw in the towel, giving Jackson the upset victory.

===== Liddell vs. Ortiz =====
Returning to the UFC, Liddell was once again in contention for the light heavyweight title, preparing for a match with former champion Tito Ortiz. Eventually, after Ortiz lost the title to Randy Couture, the two would meet in a highly anticipated bout at UFC 47 on April 2, 2004, in Las Vegas, Nevada. After most of the first round was spent feeling each other out, Liddell threw a few punches and a kick which was blocked by Ortiz, with Ortiz slapping himself on the head, taunting Liddell.

When the round ended Ortiz pushed referee "Big" John McCarthy out of his way, into Liddell, and the pair exchanged words. Shortly after the second round started, Liddell landed a flurry of punches that dropped Ortiz and led to a TKO victory. Ortiz has since stated that Liddell's thumb made contact with his eye, causing him momentarily to see "nothing but black". Since UFC 47, the bad blood between both fighters remained, with Ortiz repeatedly stating that he wanted "his" title belt back. Despite the tension, Ortiz and Liddell would not fight again for two and a half years.

==== Continued success ====
===== The Ultimate Fighter =====
In early 2005, Liddell was a coach on the inaugural season of The Ultimate Fighter, Spike TV's reality show which featured fighters competing for a UFC contract.

He coached Team Liddell, while then UFC Light Heavyweight Champion Randy Couture coached Team Couture. The series was a success for both Spike TV and the UFC. Both of the winners of the show, Diego Sanchez and Forrest Griffin, were members of Team Liddell and went on to have very successful careers in the UFC.

===== Liddell vs. Couture II =====
On April 16, 2005, at UFC 52, Liddell fought Randy Couture, again for the light heavyweight title. Couture moved in for a punch, Liddell countered with a big right hand to the temple of Couture, knocking him out cold, making him the new UFC Light Heavyweight Champion.

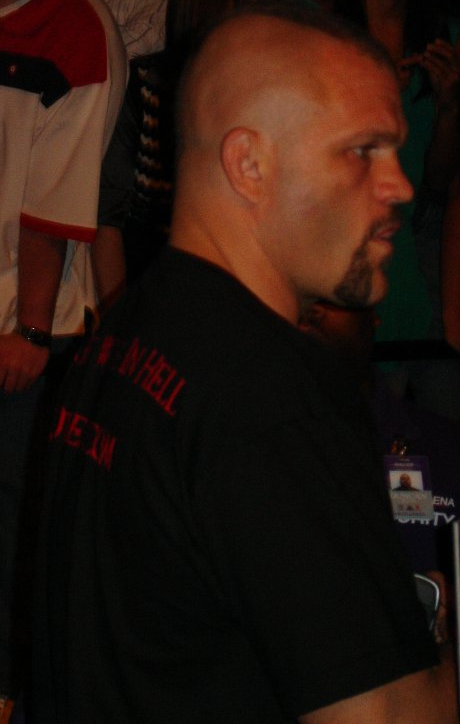
Liddell in 2007

===== Liddell vs. Horn II =====
Liddell was scheduled to defend his new title against longtime veteran Jeremy Horn, at UFC 54, a matchup the UFC claimed was demanded by long-time fans of the sport since Horn had given Liddell his first loss. Throughout the bout, Liddell dominated with aggressive punches, causing knockdowns in several rounds. Liddell's defensive wrestling ability, especially his sprawl, stifled the bulk of Horn's offense, which was centered on grappling and submission wrestling.

Liddell eventually won the fight via TKO in 2:46 minutes of the fourth round after Horn informed the referee that he could not see. He had been hit with a right punch to the eye causing him to bleed from his eye as well as his nose. Liddell had successfully defended his title and, in the process, avenged two of his three career losses.

===== Liddell vs. Couture III =====
On February 4, 2006, at UFC 57, Liddell faced Randy Couture in a rubber match, After an action packed first round, Liddell landed a big punch to Couture's face causing him to bleed, Couture bounced back with a take down of Liddell, but he was able to get up right away. Later in the second round as Couture moved in Liddell countered similar to in the second fight at UFC 52 knocking Couture out, defeating Couture for the second time via knockout in Las Vegas, Nevada, to retain the light heavyweight championship belt. After the fight, Couture announced his retirement from mixed martial arts.

===== Liddell vs. Sobral II =====
In his next defense, at UFC 62 on August 26, 2006, Liddell would beat Renato "Babalu" Sobral, who he had defeated nearly three years prior. Seconds after the fight started Sobral came running forward throwing punches. Liddell, moving backwards, was landing big punches, and a right uppercut ended the fight at 1:35 of the first round. This fight earned him a Knockout of the Night award. It was announced during UFC 61 that, were he to defeat Sobral, Liddell would face off against PRIDE Middleweight Champion Wanderlei Silva. The fight failed to materialize due to the competing promotions' inability to reach an agreement. UFC president Dana White attributed this to Silva's subsequent knockout loss to Mirko Filipović.

===== Liddell vs. Ortiz II =====
In what was the most financially successful UFC event up to that point, Liddell fought a rematch with Tito Ortiz at UFC 66, which took place on December 30, 2006. Liddell's takedown defense neutralized Ortiz's wrestling ability, forcing Ortiz to stand up with a known striker. Although Ortiz did take Liddell down at one point in the fight, Liddell went on to defeat Ortiz via TKO in the third round to defend his light heavyweight championship successfully for a fourth time. This fight earned him a Fight of the Night award. It was later revealed that Liddell had torn his MCL prior to the fight. He had also popped the tendon out on the middle finger on his left hand during the fight itself.

==== Title loss and decline ====
===== Liddell vs. Jackson II =====
In his fifth defense, Liddell would lose the title at UFC 71 on May 26, 2007, in a rematch with Quinton "Rampage" Jackson. Liddell was knocked down by a right hook less than two minutes into the first round and was unable to defend himself against Jackson's strikes on the ground, resulting in a knockout victory for Jackson. After the loss, Liddell was widely criticized after reports indicated he had been seen in night clubs the week before the event. He responded that it was not anything he had not done prior to his other fights in Las Vegas.

===== Liddell vs. Jardine =====
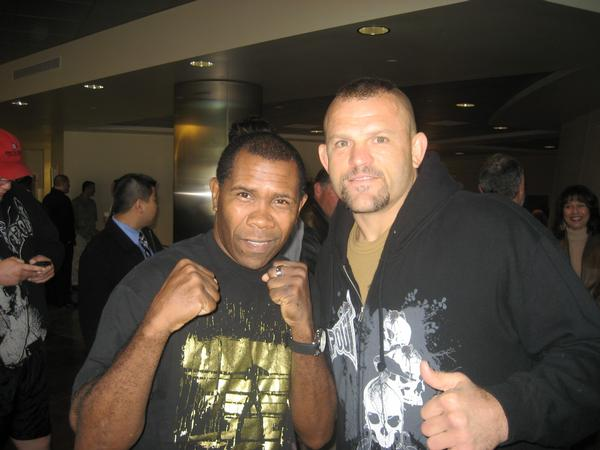
Liddell trained with American Boxing Gold Medalist Howard Davis Jr. to prepare for an April 2009 bout against Maurício Rua.

On July 11, 2007, Dana White confirmed in an interview with Yahoo! Sports that a rumored bout between Wanderlei Silva and Liddell had been canceled indefinitely. Silva and Liddell were supposed to fight in the main event at UFC 76 in Anaheim, California. Instead, Liddell would face Keith Jardine.

In the main event of UFC 76, Liddell came out landing his signature right hand to the head of Jardine, rocking him backwards, but Jardine stayed in the fight. After a dominant first round for Liddell, Jardine started to land low leg kicks continuously, while Liddell was unable to time his strikes against the unorthodox southpaw. Liddell lost a close split decision, making it the first time he had suffered consecutive losses in his career. Liddell stated he wanted a rematch and claimed he had never taken Jardine seriously.

===== Liddell vs. Silva =====
On October 23, 2007, White announced that a matchup between Liddell and Wanderlei Silva would finally take place at UFC 79. Liddell defeated Silva via unanimous decision, out-landing Silva with harder, more efficient punches and getting two takedowns later in the fight. Both fighters were awarded "Fight of the Night" honors. This fight was voted 2007's Fight of the Year at the first annual World Mixed Martial Arts Awards and ultimately was Liddell's final victory in MMA.

===== Liddell vs. Evans =====
On February 1, 2008, Maurício "Shogun" Rua revealed that he had recently signed a contract to fight Liddell, however on March 4 it was announced on UFC.com that Rua was receiving surgery on his knee and had been forced to withdraw from the fight. It was later officially announced that undefeated wrestler "Suga" Rashad Evans would replace Maurício Rua in a bout at UFC 85 in London, England. However, a hamstring injury forced Liddell to withdraw from the fight.

On September 6, 2008, Liddell faced Rashad Evans at UFC 88. He lost the fight via knockout in the second round after Evans connected with an overhand right. The loss led to renewed criticism of Liddell over-relying on the same coaches and training partners.

Shortly after his knockout loss to Evans, long-time trainer John Hackleman confirmed that Liddell was participating in training sessions with American Top Team to "round out his skills", although he remained officially associated with Hackleman and The Pit fight team.

===== Liddell vs. Shogun =====
On January 17, 2009, Dana White confirmed during the UFC 93 post fight press conference that Liddell's next fight would be against the 2005 Pride Middleweight Grand Prix Champion Maurício "Shogun" Rua at UFC 97 on April 18 in Montreal, Canada.

Liddell was defeated by Rua due to punches late in the first round resulting in a technical knockout. After the fight, White declared that Liddell would retire from fighting.

White stated, "I care about him. I care about his health, and it's over, man. It's over." White went further, saying, "At the end of the day, I care about these guys. I don't want to see anybody stick around too long. You're never going to see Chuck Liddell on the canvas again." In May however, Liddell's trainer, John Hackleman, claimed 'with confidence' that Liddell had at least one more fight in him and was "definitely on top of the food chain."

In a later interview, White went on to say, "Can I tell him not to fight? Absolutely not. If he still wants to fight, he can fight. I'm not saying, 'It will never happen. It will never happen.' But he made a deal with me [not to fight]."

=== Hall of Fame and talks of retirement ===
On July 10, 2009, at the UFC 100 Fan Expo in Las Vegas, Nevada, Liddell was inducted into the UFC Hall of Fame.

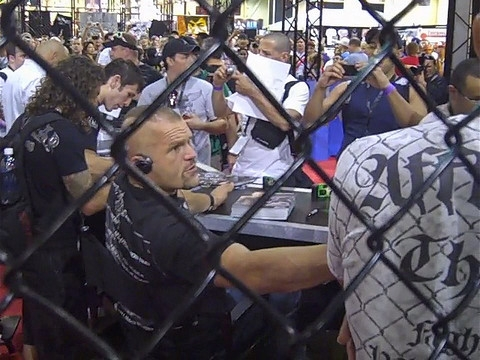
Chuck Liddell with the fans at the UFC 100 Fan Expo

After UFC 101 in August, Dana White stated that "I don't want him to (fight). He wants to, so we'll see what happens." Two days later, Liddell went on record to say that he was undecided on the matter and that "it's hard for an athlete to quit what he's done his whole life." Liddell went on to say that he would be "making that decision in the gym, not in the ring" after sparring sessions.

==== Liddell vs. Franklin ====
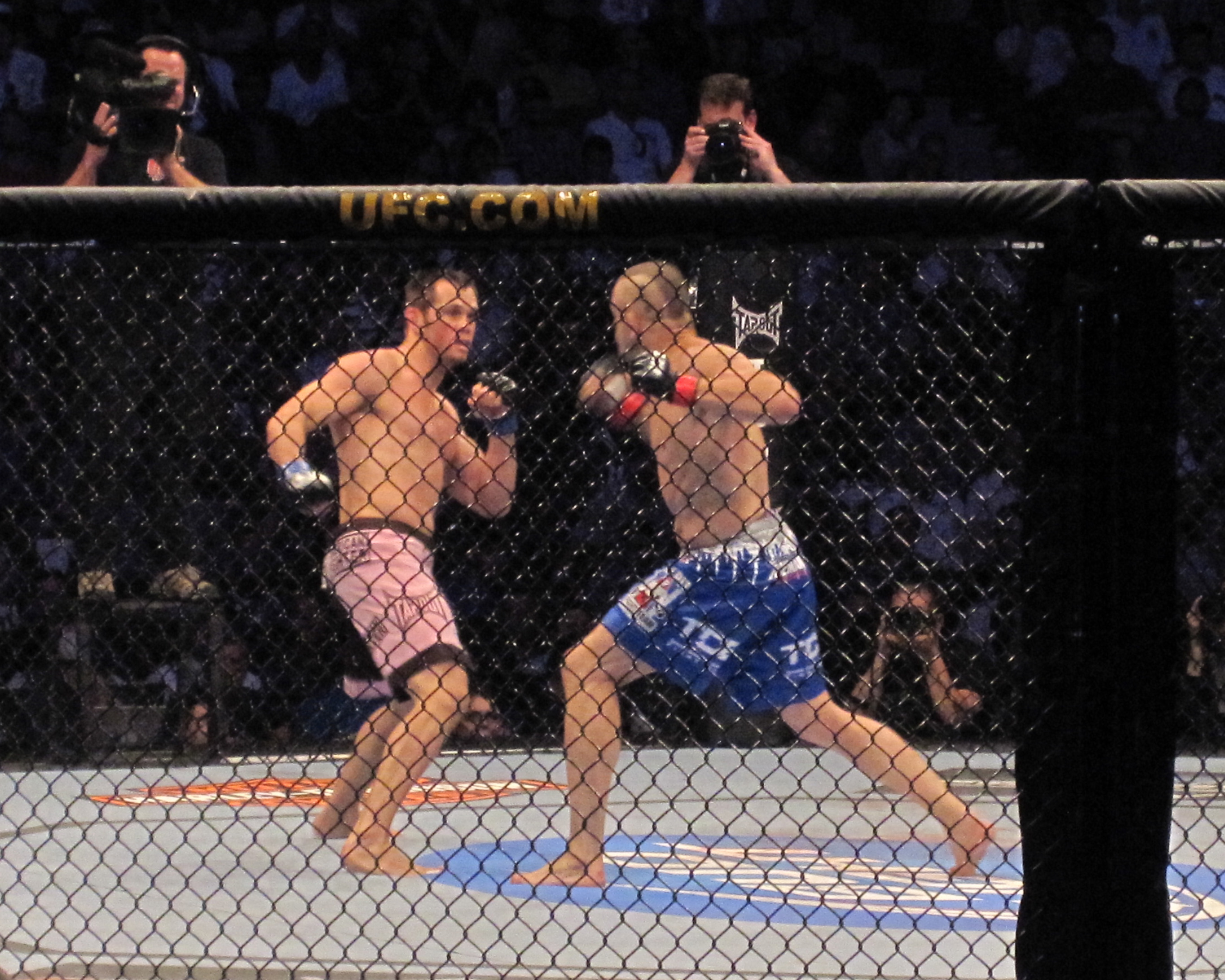
In his final UFC fight Chuck Liddell suffered his third consecutive knockout defeat to Rich Franklin at UFC 115 in Vancouver, Canada.

It was later announced that Liddell would be coaching against fierce rival Tito Ortiz on the 11th season of The Ultimate Fighter, with the two of them fighting each other on June 12, 2010, at UFC 115. However, in March, it was rumored that Ortiz had pulled out for unknown reasons and would be replaced by former UFC middleweight champion Rich Franklin. This was denied by UFC president Dana White.

On April 7, 2010, White confirmed that Liddell vs. Ortiz 3 would be the main event for the card. However, on April 12, 2010, the main event was changed to Liddell vs. Rich Franklin.

On June 12, 2010, Liddell faced Franklin at UFC 115 in Vancouver, Canada. Franklin connected with a counter right hook, knocking Liddell unconscious with five seconds remaining in the first round. Earlier in the fight, Franklin had broken his arm blocking a body kick from Liddell. Only a few hours after the match, UFC President Dana White declared that Chuck Liddell would not fight in the UFC ever again.

==== UFC retirement ====
With the opinions and considerations of his family and friends in mind after losing three consecutive fights by knockout, Liddell decided to end his fighting career on December 29, 2010. At the UFC 125 press conference, Liddell announced his retirement and stated he would be taking the position of Vice President of Business Development within the UFC. Liddell was visibly emotional at the announcement, acknowledging his retirement and an end to his fighting with words of farewell: "Most of all I want to thank my fans and my family. I love this sport and I'm excited to go to this new stage in my life and keep promoting the best sport in the world, the sport I love... now that I'm retired."

On September 8, 2013, during an interview on the Opie and Anthony show, Liddell stated that there was a possibility of one last comeback, similar to George Foreman.

==== Return and second retirement ====
Liddell announced on April 14, 2018, that he was coming out of retirement to target a third fight with Tito Ortiz. The fight took place on November 24, 2018, under Oscar De La Hoya's Golden Boy Promotions. Liddell lost the fight via knockout in the first round.

On March 3, 2020, Liddell announced in a TMZ interview that he has retired from mixed martial arts again.

== Fighting style ==
Chuck Liddell was one of the first successful proponents of the "sprawl and brawl" MMA fighting style, which relied on takedown defense and standup fighting in an era where wrestling had been the dominant force. Liddell's style (a hybrid of karate and kajukenbo) focused mainly on the hands, although he was also successful at times with the head kick. To viewers, his unique striking style did not appear refined but his combination of speed, accuracy, and power meant that he was one of the most dangerous knockout artists of his time. While not the most defensively sound, for years he was known for being nearly impossible to knock out.

== Legal trouble ==
On October 11, 2021, Liddell was arrested and booked into a Los Angeles-area jail on a misdemeanor charge of domestic battery. He was held at the Malibu Sheriff's Station on a $20,000 bond. After his bond was met and Liddell was released, he posted a statement on his Instagram page stating he was the victim of domestic violence, but offered to protect his family from legal issues and voluntarily went into custody instead of his wife. The court hearing for this case was scheduled on October 13, 2021. According to the legal report, Liddell and his wife were pushing each other during an argument, and Liddell had marks on his face and chest, while his wife did not have any physical marks on her after the incident. The District Attorney's office opted not to charge Liddell or his wife. Three days after the alleged domestic incident, Liddell filed for a divorce.

== Personal life ==
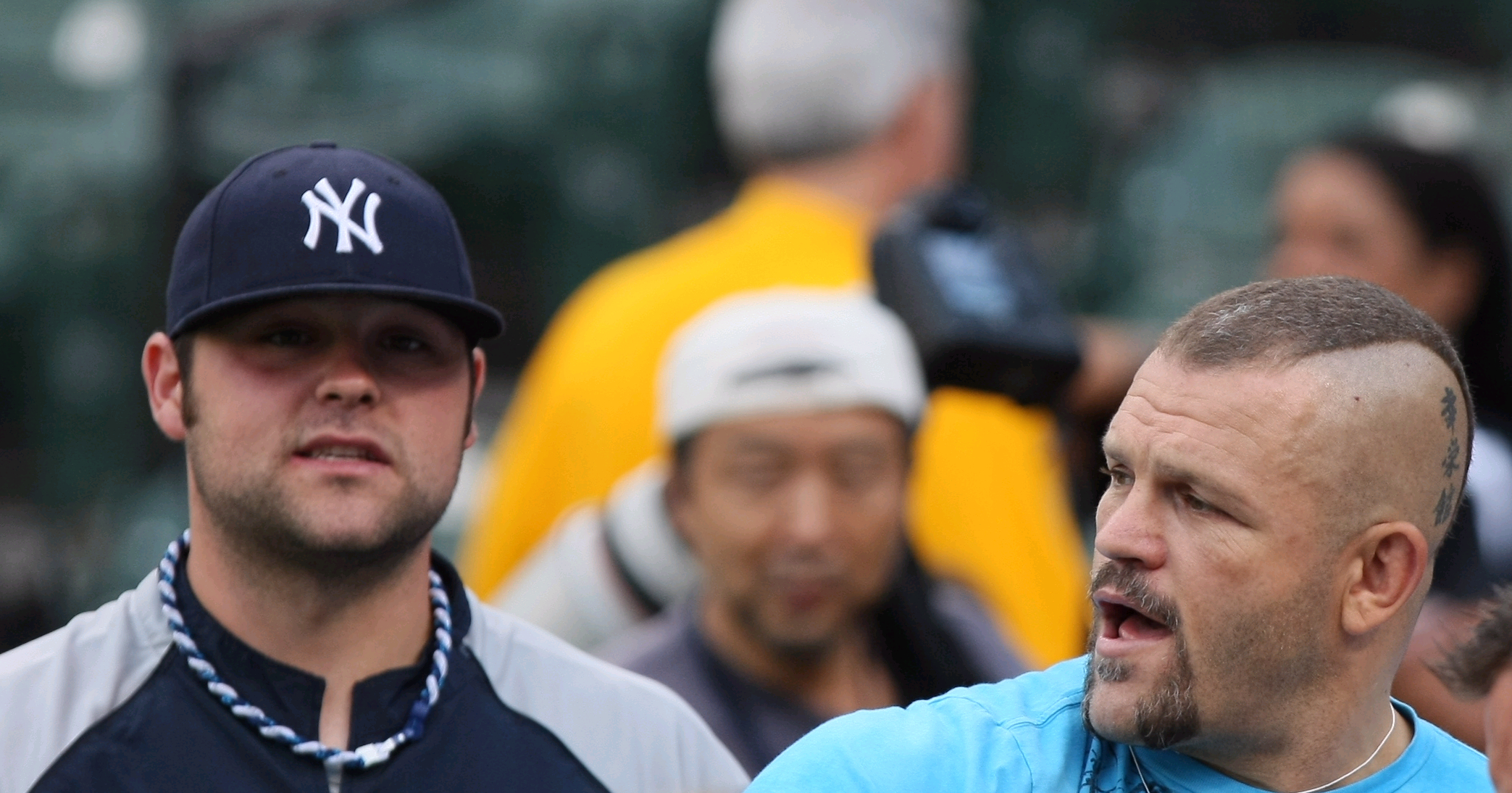
With Joba Chamberlain in 2009

Liddell is associated with John Hackleman and The Pit fight team. His brother Sean, who also competed in MMA and fought in the WEC, retired in 2007 with a 1–2 record. He has a brother named Dan and a sister named Laura.

Liddell continues to train in San Luis Obispo, California, where he attended college along with fellow team member and friend Wyatt Courtney. He has a daughter with MMA fighter Casey Noland. From a prior relationship he has a son. Liddell proposed to his now ex-wife Heidi Northcott on November 4, 2010. Their daughter was born in 2011. Their son was born in 2013.

Liddell is a former part-owner of two bars in Lincoln, Nebraska: Dillinger's and NZone.

In 2010, he opened The Ultimate Iceman, a memorabilia store in San Luis Obispo. This store was closed in 2011 to focus on online sales.

Liddell endorsed John McCain in the 2008 United States presidential election.

Liddell's moniker, "The Iceman", was coined by his trainer, John Hackleman, of Liddell's calm and relaxed temperament before fights.

My pulse rate rarely goes up or down, no matter how tense or relaxed the situation. In fact, that's how I got my nickname: the Iceman. Hackleman gave it to me around my third kickboxing match. We were hanging out in the locker room before the fight, and he noticed that I wasn't breaking a sweat or shaking out my arms to release some of the jitters and didn't have any other nervous tics. He told me he had been in countless pro fights and was anxious before every one of them. Meanwhile, I looked as if I were going for a stroll in the park. He thought I had ice in my veins.

After retirement, Liddell served as Vice President of Business Development within the UFC.

=== Good Morning Texas interview ===
In March 2007, shortly before UFC 68, he appeared on Good Morning Texas (Texan version of Good Morning America) for an interview, and to promote the film 300, but appeared to be very drowsy and fell asleep mid-interview. The interview ended when Liddell asked the host who he would like to fight. UFC President Dana White, along with Liddell's head coach Scott VanGilder, explained that Liddell had pneumonia and had taken a large dose of sedatives the night before the interview.

== Print media ==
On May 9, 2007, Liddell became the first UFC fighter to be on the cover of ESPN The Magazine. Liddell released his autobiography, Iceman: My Fighting Life, on January 29, 2008, and it spent multiple weeks on the New York Times' best seller list.

== Filmography ==
=== Film ===
| Year | Title | Role | Notes |
|---|---|---|---|
| 1981 | The Postman Always Rings Twice | Boy Scout | Uncredited |
| 2001 | How High | Tough Guy | |
| 2003 | Cradle 2 the Grave | Cage Fighter | Uncredited |
| 2006 | Bachelor Party Vegas | "The Iceman" | |
| 2007 | The Death and Life of Bobby Z | "Maddog" | |
| 2008 | Drillbit Taylor | Himself | |
| 2009 | The Ballad of G.I. Joe | Gung-Ho | |
| 2010 | Passion Play | Aldo | |
| 2013 | Kick-Ass 2 | Himself | |
| 2013 | Fight Life | Himself | MMA Documentary |
| 2015 | War Pigs | Sergeant McGreevy | |
| 2015 | Riot | Balam | |
| 2018 | Silencer | Nels | |
| 2019 | D-Day: Battle of Omaha Beach | General Omar Bradley | Direct-to-Video |
| 2019 | Acceleration | Hannibal | |
| 2020 | Cagefighter: Worlds Collide | Marcus | |
| 2020 | Fight of Fury | Crime Boss | |
| 2023 | Steve-O's Bucket List | Himself | Direct-to-video; Guest appearances |
| 2024 | Fight Another Day | Barbarian | |

=== Television ===
| Year | Title | Role | Notes |
|---|---|---|---|
| 2006 | Blade: The Series | Graft | |
| 2007 | Entourage | Himself | 1 episode |
| 2007 | Punk'd | Himself | 1 episode |
| 2009 | The Simpsons | Himself (voice) | Episode: "The Great Wife Hope" |
| 2009 | Dancing with the Stars | Himself | 15 episodes |
| 2009 | Deadliest Warrior | Himself | |
| 2011 | Criminal Minds: Suspect Behavior | Martinez | 1 episode "Death by a Thousand Cuts" |
| 2011 | Blue Mountain State | Himself | 1 episode "Trap Game" |
| 2011 | The Being Frank Show | | 2 episodes |
| 2011 | Hawaii Five-0 | Himself | 1 episode |
| 2013 | Bones | Himself | 1 episode "The Lady on the List" |
| 2017 | Workaholics | Uncle Mike | 1 episode |
| 2018 | Ultimate Expedition | Himself | 2 episode |
| 2018 | Celebrity Big Brother | Himself | HouseGuest - 11th Place |
| 2023 | The Eric Andre Show | Himself | Episode: "Football Is Back" |

== Television ==
Liddell was one of 16 people to compete on Season 9 of Dancing with the Stars. He and professional dance partner, Anna Trebunskaya got 11th place in Week 4.

In 2009, Liddell made a guest appearance on The Simpsons in Season 21, Episode 3 The Great Wife Hope.

In 2018, Liddell was a houseguest on the first U.S. season of Celebrity Big Brother, where he was the first person evicted.

In October 2019, ESPN released the first of their 30 for 30 specials to focus on mixed martial arts. The film, called 'Chuck and Tito', focused on the fights and feud between Liddell and Tito Ortiz.

== Championships and accomplishments ==
=== Hall of Fame ===
- Cal Poly Athletics Hall of Fame – Class of 2009
- Martial Arts History Museum Hall of Fame – Class of 2014

=== Mixed martial arts ===
- Ultimate Fighting Championship
  - UFC Hall of Fame (Pioneer Wing, Class of 2009)
  - UFC Light Heavyweight Championship (One time)
    - Four successful title defenses
    - Tied (Alex Pereira) for second most title fight wins in UFC Light Heavyweight division history (5)
    - Tied (Matt Hughes, Randy Couture & T.J. Dillashaw) for third most knockouts in UFC title fights (5)
    - Tied (Alex Pereira) for most knockouts in UFC Light Heavyweight title fights (5)
  - Fight of the Night (Two times) vs. Tito Ortiz 2, Wanderlei Silva
  - Knockout of the Night (One time) vs. Renato Sobral
  - UFC Encyclopedia Awards
    - Fight of the Night (Seven times) vs. Jeremy Horn 1, Vitor Belfort, Randy Couture 1, Tito Ortiz 1, Vernon White, Jeremy Horn 2 and Randy Couture 3
    - Knockout of the Night (Three times) vs. Renato Sobral, Randy Couture 2 and Randy Couture 3
      - Tied (Tito Ortiz) for most Encyclopedia Post-Fight Awards (10)
  - Most knockouts in UFC Light Heavyweight division history (10)
  - Longest knockout win streak in UFC history (7)
  - Tied (Charles Oliveira) for the second longest finish streak in modern UFC history (7) (behind Anderson Silva)
  - Tied (Lyoto Machida, Junior dos Santos, Thiago Santos, Maurício Rua & Khalil Rountree Jr.) for sixth most knockdowns landed in UFC history (14)
    - Tied (Mauricio Rua & Khalil Rountree Jr.) for most knockdowns landed in UFC Light Heavyweight division history (14)
    - Tied (Quinton Jackson, Josh Emmett, Cody Garbrandt, Montel Jackson & Ilia Topuria) for most consecutive fights with a knockdown landed in UFC history (7)
  - Tied (Rashad Evans & Magomed Ankalaev) for fifth most wins in UFC Light Heavyweight division history (13)
  - Fourth most finishes in modern UFC Light Heavyweight division history (9)
  - Tied (Navajo Stirling) for the fifth longest win streak in UFC Light Heavyweight division history (7)
  - Holds wins over six former UFC champions — vs. Kevin Randleman, Guy Mezger, Murilo Bustamante, Vitor Belfort, Tito Ortiz (x2) and Randy Couture (x2)
  - UFC.com Awards
    - 2005: Knockout of the Year vs. Randy Couture 2
    - 2006: Ranked #5 Knockout of the Year vs. Randy Couture 3
    - 2007: Ranked #3 Fight of the Year vs. Wanderlei Silva
- International Fighting Championship
  - IFC World Light Heavyweight Championship (Once)
- ESPN
  - #8 Ranked Men's MMA Fighter of the 21st Century
- FanSided
  - 2000s #7 Ranked MMA Fighter of the Decade
- Sherdog
  - 2006 Fighter of the Year
  - Mixed Martial Arts Hall of Fame
- Black Belt Magazine
  - 2001 NHB Co-Competitor of the Year along with Tito Ortiz
- World MMA Awards
  - 2008 Fight of the Year vs. Wanderlei Silva at UFC 79
- Spike TV Guys' Choice Awards
  - 2007 Most Dangerous Man.
- Fight Matrix
  - 2006 Male Fighter of the Year
- MMA Fighting
  - 2002 Light Heavyweight Fighter of the Year
  - 2006 Light Heavyweight Fighter of the Year
- Yahoo Sports
  - 2007 Fight of the Year vs. Wanderlei Silva at UFC 79
- Heavy Sports
  - 2000s MMA Fighter of the Decade

=== Kickboxing ===
- International Kickboxing Federation
  - IKF Amateur International Rules U.S. Super Heavyweight Championship (One time)
- World Kickboxing and Karate Association
  - WKA Amateur International Rules U.S. Heavyweight Championship (One time)
- United States Muay Thai Association
  - USMTA Amateur Muay Thai North American Heavyweight Championship (One time)

== Mixed martial arts record ==
Professional record breakdown
| 30 matches | 21 wins | 9 losses |
| By knockout | 13 | 7 |
| By submission | 1 | 1 |
| By decision | 7 | 1 |

| Res. | Record | Opponent | Method | Event | Date | Round | Time | Location | Notes |
|---|---|---|---|---|---|---|---|---|---|
| Loss | 21–9 | Tito Ortiz | KO (punches) | Golden Boy Promotions: Liddell vs. Ortiz 3 | November 24, 2018 | 1 | 4:24 | Inglewood, California, United States | Heavyweight bout. |
| Loss | 21–8 | Rich Franklin | KO (punch) | UFC 115 | June 12, 2010 | 1 | 4:55 | Vancouver, British Columbia, Canada | |
| Loss | 21–7 | Maurício Rua | TKO (punches) | UFC 97 | April 18, 2009 | 1 | 4:28 | Montreal, Quebec, Canada | |
| Loss | 21–6 | Rashad Evans | KO (punch) | UFC 88 | September 6, 2008 | 2 | 1:51 | Atlanta, Georgia, United States | |
| Win | 21–5 | Wanderlei Silva | Decision (unanimous) | UFC 79 | December 29, 2007 | 3 | 5:00 | Las Vegas, Nevada, United States | Fight of the Night. |
| Loss | 20–5 | Keith Jardine | Decision (split) | UFC 76 | September 22, 2007 | 3 | 5:00 | Anaheim, California, United States | |
| Loss | 20–4 | Quinton Jackson | KO (punches) | UFC 71 | May 26, 2007 | 1 | 1:53 | Las Vegas, Nevada, United States | Lost the UFC Light Heavyweight Championship. |
| Win | 20–3 | Tito Ortiz | TKO (punches) | UFC 66 | December 30, 2006 | 3 | 3:59 | Las Vegas, Nevada, United States | Defended the UFC Light Heavyweight Championship. Fight of the Night. |
| Win | 19–3 | Renato Sobral | TKO (punches) | UFC 62 | August 26, 2006 | 1 | 1:35 | Las Vegas, Nevada, United States | Defended the UFC Light Heavyweight Championship. Knockout of the Night. |
| Win | 18–3 | Randy Couture | KO (punch) | UFC 57 | February 4, 2006 | 2 | 1:28 | Las Vegas, Nevada, United States | Defended the UFC Light Heavyweight Championship. |
| Win | 17–3 | Jeremy Horn | TKO (retirement) | UFC 54 | August 20, 2005 | 4 | 2:46 | Las Vegas, Nevada, United States | Defended the UFC Light Heavyweight Championship. |
| Win | 16–3 | Randy Couture | KO (punches) | UFC 52 | April 16, 2005 | 1 | 2:06 | Las Vegas, Nevada, United States | Won the UFC Light Heavyweight Championship. Knockout of the Year (2005). |
| Win | 15–3 | Vernon White | KO (punch) | UFC 49 | August 21, 2004 | 1 | 4:05 | Las Vegas, Nevada, United States | |
| Win | 14–3 | Tito Ortiz | KO (punches) | UFC 47 | April 2, 2004 | 2 | 0:38 | Las Vegas, Nevada, United States | |
| Loss | 13–3 | Quinton Jackson | TKO (corner stoppage) | Pride Final Conflict 2003 | November 9, 2003 | 2 | 3:10 | Tokyo, Japan | 2003 Pride Middleweight Grand Prix Semifinals. |
| Win | 13–2 | Alistair Overeem | KO (punches) | Pride Total Elimination 2003 | August 10, 2003 | 1 | 3:09 | Saitama, Saitama, Japan | 2003 Pride Middleweight Grand Prix Quarterfinals. |
| Loss | 12–2 | Randy Couture | TKO (punches) | UFC 43 | June 6, 2003 | 3 | 2:39 | Las Vegas, Nevada, United States | For the interim UFC Light Heavyweight Championship. |
| Win | 12–1 | Renato Sobral | KO (head kick) | UFC 40 | November 22, 2002 | 1 | 2:55 | Las Vegas, Nevada, United States | |
| Win | 11–1 | Vitor Belfort | Decision (unanimous) | UFC 37.5 | June 22, 2002 | 3 | 5:00 | Las Vegas, Nevada, United States | |
| Win | 10–1 | Amar Suloev | Decision (unanimous) | UFC 35 | January 11, 2002 | 3 | 5:00 | Uncasville, Connecticut, United States | |
| Win | 9–1 | Murilo Bustamante | Decision (unanimous) | UFC 33 | September 28, 2001 | 3 | 5:00 | Las Vegas, Nevada, United States | |
| Win | 8–1 | Guy Mezger | KO (punch) | Pride 14 - Clash of the Titans | May 27, 2001 | 2 | 0:21 | Kanagawa, Japan | |
| Win | 7–1 | Kevin Randleman | KO (punches) | UFC 31 | May 4, 2001 | 1 | 1:18 | Atlantic City, New Jersey, United States | |
| Win | 6–1 | Jeff Monson | Decision (unanimous) | UFC 29 | December 16, 2000 | 3 | 5:00 | Tokyo, Japan | |
| Win | 5–1 | Ron Kosakowski | KO (head kick) | IFC WC 9 | July 18, 2000 | 2 | 5:39 | Friant, California, United States | Won the IFC World Light Heavyweight Championship. |
| Win | 4–1 | Paul Jones | TKO (punches) | UFC 22 | September 24, 1999 | 1 | 3:53 | Lake Charles, Louisiana, United States | |
| Win | 3–1 | Kenneth Williams | Submission (rear-naked choke) | NG 11 | March 31, 1999 | 1 | 3:35 | Los Angeles, California, United States | |
| Loss | 2–1 | Jeremy Horn | Technical Submission (arm-triangle choke) | UFC 19 | March 5, 1999 | 1 | 12:00 | Bay St. Louis, Mississippi, United States | |
| Win | 2–0 | Jose Landi-Jons | Decision (unanimous) | IVC 6 | August 23, 1998 | 1 | 30:00 | São Paulo, Brazil | |
| Win | 1–0 | Noe Hernandez | Decision (unanimous) | UFC 17 | May 15, 1998 | 1 | 12:00 | Mobile, Alabama, United States | |

== Pay-per-view bouts ==
| No. | Event | Fight | Date | PPV Buys |
|---|---|---|---|---|
| 1. | UFC 43 | Liddell vs. Couture | June 6, 2003 | 49,000 |
| 2. | UFC 47 | Ortiz vs. Liddell | April 2, 2004 | 105,000 |
| 3. | UFC 52 | Couture vs. Liddell 2 | April 16, 2005 | 280,000 |
| 4. | UFC 54 | Liddell vs. Horn | August 20, 2005 | 150,000 |
| 5. | UFC 57 | Liddell vs. Couture 3 | February 4, 2006 | 400,000 |
| 6. | UFC 62 | Liddell vs. Sobral | August 26, 2006 | 500,000 |
| 7. | UFC 66 | Liddell vs. Ortiz 2 | December 30, 2006 | 929,000 |
| 8. | UFC 71 | Liddell vs. Jackson | May 26, 2007 | 675,000 |
| 9. | UFC 76 | Liddell vs. Jardine | September 22, 2007 | 475,000 |
| 10. | UFC 79 | Liddell vs. Silva (co) | December 29, 2007 | 650,000 |
| 11. | UFC 88 | Liddell vs. Evans | September 6, 2008 | 480,000 |
| 12. | UFC 97 | Liddell vs. Shogun (co) | April 18, 2009 | 650,000 |
| 13. | UFC 115 | Liddell vs. Franklin | June 12, 2010 | 520,000 |
| 14. | Liddell Vs Ortiz 3 | Liddell vs. Ortiz 3 | November 24, 2018 | 40,000 |
| Total sales | | | | 5,903,000 |

== Books ==
- (2008) Iceman: My Fighting Life. Dutton Adult. ISBN 978-0-525-95056-1.

Awards and achievements
| Preceded by Randy Couture | 6th UFC Light Heavyweight Champion; April 16, 2005 – May 26, 2007 | Succeeded by Quinton Jackson |
