= Liddell =

Liddell is a surname. Notable people with this name, also Lidell, include:

- Alan Liddell (1930–1972), English cricketer, son of Allan Liddell
- Alice Liddell (1852–1934), English "muse" of Lewis Carroll
- Allan Liddell (1908–1970), English cricketer for Northamptonshire
- Alvar Lidell (1908–1981), BBC radio announcer and newsreader
- Andy Liddell (born 1973), Scottish footballer
- Angélica Liddell (born 1966), Spanish writer, theatre director, and actor
- Anna Forbes Liddell (1891–1979), American academic and feminist
- Sir B. H. Liddell Hart (1895–1970), British military strategist
- Barney Liddell (1921–2003), American big band musician
- Billy Liddell (1922–2001), Scottish footballer
- Cedric Liddell (1913–1981), Canadian rower
- Chad Liddell (born 1977), Australian rules footballer
- Charles Liddell (1813–1894), railway engineer
- Chekesha Liddell, American materials scientist
- Chris Liddell (born 1958), businessman and philanthropist,
- Chuck Liddell (born 1969), mixed martial artist
- Claire Liddell (born 1937), Scottish composer
- Clive Gerard Liddell (1883–1956), British Army officer
- Colin Liddell (1925–1997), Scottish footballer
- Danny Liddell, Scottish footballer
- Dave Liddell (born 1966), Major League Baseball catcher
- David Liddell (1917–2008), Scottish soldier, insurance broker, and farmer
- David Liddell-Grainger (1930–2007), Deputy Lieutenant of Berwickshire
- Dorothy Liddell (1890–1938), archaeologist
- E. J. Liddell (born 2000), American basketball player
- Elizabeth Liddell (1770–1831), British artist
- Emilie Autumn Liddell (born 1979), American rock/alternative/electronic artist
- Emma Liddell (born 1980), Australian cricketer
- Eric Liddell (1902–1945), Scottish athlete
- Frank Liddell (politician) (1862–1939), Australian politician
- Frank Liddell, American record producer
- Frederick Francis Liddell (1865–1950), British lawyer and civil servant
- Gary Liddell (1954–2015), Scottish footballer
- George Liddell (footballer) (1895–?), English football player and manager
- Guy Liddell (1892–1958), British intelligence officer
- Lt. Col. Guy Liddell (1868–1954), British inventor of the Liddell hut
- Helen Liddell (born 1950), British politician
- Henry Liddell (1811–1898), Classical scholar and father of Alice Liddell
- Henry Liddell, 1st Baron Ravensworth (1708–1784), 1st Baron Ravensworth
- Ian Liddell (born 1938), structural engineer
- Ian Liddell-Grainger (born 1959), Member of Parliament for Bridgwater
- Ian Oswald Liddell (1919–1945), Victoria Cross recipient
- James Liddell (1905–?), Scottish footballer
- Jim Liddell (born 1953), English footballer
- John Aidan Liddell (1888–1915), Victoria Cross recipient
- Keith Liddell, US boxer, mathematician and author
- Linea Søgaard-Lidell (born 1987), Danish politician
- Mary Liddell (1877–1967), Australian journalist and feminist
- Moses J. Liddell (1845–1891), justice
- Ned Liddell (1878–1969), English football player, manager, and scout
- Nona Liddell (1927–2017), British violinist
- Pamela Liddell (born 1986), Scottish international football striker
- Patrick Liddell, Composer and video artist
- Richard Liddell (1690s–1746)
- Robert Liddell (1908–1992), English writer
- Robert Liddell (Pittsburgh) (1837–1893), Mayor of Pittsburgh, Pennsylvania
- Robert Scotland Liddell (1885–1972), British journalist
- Robin Liddell (born 1974), Scottish racing driver
- Samuel Liddell (pirate) (fl. 1716), pirate in the Caribbean
- St. John Richardson Liddell (1815–1870), Louisiana planter and Confederate general
- Stuart Liddell (born 1973), Scottish bagpipe player
- Thomas Liddell (disambiguation)
- Wade Liddell (born 1979), Scotland international rugby league footballer

== See also ==
- Liddel Strength § Barony of Liddel
- Lidell Townsell, house-music artist
- Liddle
- Lidl (supermarket chain)
- Liddel (disambiguation)
