= Randy Couture vs. Chuck Liddell =

Mixed martial arts rivalries

Randy "The Natural" Couture vs. Chuck "The Iceman" Liddell is a mixed martial arts trilogy. All three fights took place under Ultimate Fighting Championship in the United States. All three fights have ended in knockout and have been for the UFC Light Heavyweight Championship. At the first meeting at UFC 43, Couture won by technical knockout at 2:40 in the third round. By this victory he won the UFC Light Heavyweight Championship. The second time, after The Ultimate Fighter 1, at UFC 52, Liddell won by knockout at 2:06 in the very first round. At the third and final match-up Liddell once again won, making it 2–1 for himself, by KO at 1:28 in the second round.

== Background ==
Before the first meeting between the two, Randy Couture fought at heavyweight and was heavyweight champion twice before the first match-up. Couture moved down to light heavyweight after two consecutive losses against larger grapplers Josh Barnett, and Ricco Rodriguez, both with the heavyweight title at stake.

Liddell was a rising light heavyweight contender before the first fight. Couture had developed a feared reputation as a wrestler who could strike. Going on a 9 fight win streak before the fight with Couture, Liddell had 11 victories with only one loss to submission specialist Jeremy Horn.

The origins of the trilogy go back to UFC 36 on March 22, 2002, in Las Vegas, Nevada. Randy Couture was the defending UFC heavyweight champion and was making his third title defense against grappling standout Josh Barnett. Couture was controlling the majority of the fight until Barnett took his back and delivered a series of unanswered strikes to the head before the referee stopped the bout at 4:35 of the second round. Following the event, Barnett tested positive for steroids in a post-fight drug test and was stripped of the title and suspended by the Nevada Athletic Commission.

Meanwhile, Chuck Liddell was scheduled to fight Brazilian boxer Vitor Belfort at UFC 37.5 in June in Las Vegas to determine the number one contender for the UFC light-heavyweight championship. Liddell won by unanimous decision. While it was expected that Liddell would face Tito Ortiz (his friend and former training partner) for the title, Ortiz expressed desire for a grudge match against mixed martial arts pioneer Ken Shamrock. Ortiz and Shamrock finally met in November at UFC 40. Ortiz dominated Shamrock with multiple strikes and takedowns and won the bout by TKO (corner stoppage) at 5:00 of the third round. Earlier that night, Liddell defeated Renato Sobral by KO (head kick) in the first round. After the fight, Liddell stated that he wanted his next fight to be for the light-heavyweight title. Ortiz said later that he and Liddell would have to renegotiate things, stating that their friendship wasn't worth the money they were being paid to fight.

Following the steroids controversy with Barnett, Couture faced heavyweight grappler Ricco Rodriguez at UFC 39 in September 2002 for the vacant UFC heavyweight title. Again, Couture found himself in control of the fight until Rodriguez delivered multiple strikes and elbows from the mounted position and was declared the new heavyweight champion at 3:04 of the fifth round. Many fans and critics believed that Couture at the age of 38 years was done as a mixed martial artist believing that he was too small and old to compete with the younger heavyweights following his second consecutive loss.

Proceedings were not going well with the UFC Light Heavyweight Championship. Ortiz was in a contractual dispute with the company and refused to defend his title against Liddell, citing injuries, entertainment obligations, and inadequate pay.

== UFC 43: Meltdown ==
- Date: June 6, 2003

Tale of the tape
Boxer	(United States) Randy Couture	(United States) Chuck Liddell
Nickname	The Natural	The Iceman
Hometown	Everett, Washington	Santa Barbara, California
Pre-fight record	10–5	12–1

Result
- Randy Couture wins by technical knockout at 2:39 of round 3

After months of failed negotiations, the UFC created an interim light heavyweight title to be fought for in June 2003 at UFC 43 in an effort pressure Ortiz to return and defend his title. As a special attraction for the fans, the UFC decided to have Randy Couture move down from heavyweight to light heavyweight and face Chuck Liddell for the interim belt. Many believed Liddell would easily defeat Couture and eventually face Ortiz to unify the title. Couture was a heavy underdog going into the fight with critics citing his age and recent losses at heavyweight. In what was a shock to the MMA world, Couture neutralized Liddell's powerful hooks with straight punches and eventually began taking him down at will. Couture eventually gained full mount and forced a referee stoppage due to punches at 2:39 of round 3. With this victory, Couture earned the nickname "Captain America" and became the first MMA fighter to win a professional title in another weight class. Liddell would leave to represent the UFC in the Japanese Pride Fighting Championships and would not fight again in the UFC for nearly a year.

Couture went on to face Tito Ortiz at UFC 44 for the undisputed UFC Light Heavyweight Championship in September 2003. Couture was again a major underdog going into the fight. Couture won a unanimous decision and became the undisputed UFC light heavyweight champion at age 40.

== Liddell vs Ortiz and The Ultimate Fighter ==
After their losses to Randy Couture in 2003, Liddell and Ortiz's friendship quickly disintegrated and the two became bitter rivals. Liddell was angry that Ortiz refused to fight him for the light heavyweight championship, claiming Tito knew Liddell could beat him. Stories say that while Liddell and Ortiz were training partners, Chuck always got the better of Tito by stuffing takedowns and landing multiple kicks and body shots. Ortiz however maintained that he simply did not wish to fight a friend and that the two had made a pact not to fight each other. Liddell claimed there was no such pact. The war of words continued for months and fans demanded that Chuck and Tito fight. The fight finally happened on April 2, 2004, at UFC 47 in what was billed as the biggest grudge match in mixed martial arts. Liddell defeated Ortiz by KO (punches) at :38 of the second round. Chuck became somewhat of a celebrity following his victory, appearing in multiple commercials, late night talk shows, and music videos.

Liddell once again found himself as the number one contender for the UFC Light Heavyweight Championship when he defeated Vernon White by KO (punch) at 4:05 of the first round at UFC 49 in August 2004. Later at that same event, Randy Couture defeated Vitor Belfort for the light heavyweight title by TKO (doctor stoppage) at the end of the third round, setting up a rematch between him and Liddell for the title in 2005.

The UFC was gaining in popularity in America and the organization's parent company Zuffa decided to broaden the fan base. They created The Ultimate Fighter reality TV show. Sixteen mixed martial arts fighters (eight Light Heavyweights weighing from 186 to 205 lbs and eight Middleweights weighing from 171 to 185 lbs) were invited to participate in the show where they would reside together and train in two separate teams coached by Chuck Liddell and Randy Couture. The teams would compete in physical challenges, segments hosted by singer Willa Ford, to determine which team would have the right to pair one of their own fighters against an opponent of their choice in the same weight class, with the loser being eliminated. Although opposing coaches and future opponents in the octagon, Randy and Chuck were very respectful, civil, and friendly towards each other during the taping of the show, co-developing workout routines for all the aspiring fighters, as well as dealing with some serious incidents between the participants at the house. MMA exploded in popularity during the first season on Spike TV with the finale peaking with 10 million viewers during the Forrest Griffin vs. Stephan Bonnar fight.

== UFC 52: Couture vs. Liddell 2 ==
- Date: April 16, 2005
- Title(s) on the line: UFC Light Heavyweight Championship

Tale of the tape
Boxer	(United States) Randy Couture	(United States) Chuck Liddell
Nickname	The Natural	The Iceman
Hometown	Everett, Washington	Santa Barbara, California
Pre-fight record	13–6	14–3
Recognition	UFC Light Heavyweight Champion	

Result
- Liddell wins by knockout at 2:06 of round 1

The weekend following The Ultimate Fighter 1 Finale, Randy and Chuck faced off again in the main event at UFC 52 in Las Vegas on April 16, 2005, for the UFC Light Heavyweight Championship. This would be remembered as one of the best and most important pay-per-view cards the UFC ever put together. At the time, it was the highest-grossing UFC event ever at the live gate, with $2,575,450 in ticket sales. The event also earned 280,000 PPV buys, shattering the company's previous record of 150,000 buys at UFC 40. Chuck stated that he underestimated Randy at their last bout which caused him to neglect his stamina and he would not make that mistake again. Randy on the other hand predicted that the rematch would end the same way the first fight did. The start of the match saw both fighters start on their feet feeling out the distance and attempting multiple jabs and hooks. Then Couture got Liddell in the clinch and the two exchanged multiple uppercuts and strikes. After the two broke away, Couture signaled to the referee that he had been accidentally poked in the eye which caused the referee to call for a time-out. After about a minute of examination, the ringside doctor said Couture was okay to continue the fight. Angered by the poke, Couture rushed at Liddell with multiple strikes. Seeing an opportunity, Chuck back-pedalled and caught Randy on the jaw with a straight right hand which sent him crumbling to the mat which was followed by two more unanswered strikes and caused the referee to stop the fight at 2:06 of round one and Chuck Liddell was declared the new UFC Light Heavyweight Champion.

== After TUF and UFC 54 ==
Following their UFC 52 rematch, both fighters' visibility in mainstream media increased dramatically. Revenues and the fighter pay-scale also increased and Spike TV ordered a second season of The Ultimate Fighter following the huge success of the first season and would become the network's signature program as well as the new UFC Unleashed program which aired UFC fights from past events.

Everyone expected Randy Couture and Chuck Liddell to meet again a rubber match for the title. Until then, Couture would have to earn his title shot and Liddell would have to defend his championship before a third fight could be considered. Both fighters were scheduled to fight on the UFC 54 card on August 20, 2005, in Las Vegas, Nevada. Randy faced fellow wrestler and former teammate Mike van Arsdale in what was a very competitive grappling match. Randy took control in the second round with his superior conditioning. He then defeated a visibly gassed van Arsdale by submission (Anaconda Choke) at :52 of the third round and became the number one contender for the UFC Light Heavyweight Championship.

Later that same night in the main event, Liddell fought in his first title defense against the first fighter to ever defeat him, Jeremy Horn. Although Chuck was the clear favorite as the champion, many die-hard fans gave Horn a good chance given his vast fighting experience with a professional record of 85–15–5 and the fact that he beat Liddell once before. Liddell dominated Horn with powerful strikes during the first two rounds, knocking him down twice. Horn did come back and outbox Liddell in the third round as Chuck seemed to slow down a little. In the fourth round Chuck delivered a straight right hand which caught Horn on the eye-socket and sent him to the ground again. Horn then told the referee that he could no longer see clearly and the ref ruled Liddell the winner at 2:46 of round 4 by TKO (Verbal Submission). The stage was now set a rubber match between Liddell and Couture for the UFC Light Heavyweight title.

== UFC 57: Liddell vs. Couture 3 ==
- Date: February 4, 2006
- Title(s) on the line: UFC Light Heavyweight Championship

Tale of the tape
Boxer	(United States) Randy Couture	(United States) Chuck Liddell
Nickname	The Natural	The Iceman
Hometown	Everett, Washington	Santa Barbara, California
Pre-fight record	14–7	17–3
Recognition		UFC Light Heavyweight Champion

Result
- Liddell wins by KO at 1:28 of round 2

The two fighters would meet again in the main event at UFC 57 on February 4, 2006. This would be at the time the UFC's largest grossing gate with $3.3 million in sales. The event would again shatter the previous PPV buy rate with over 400,000 buys. Randy stated that the accidental eye poke by Liddell in their last fight caused him to be angry and reckless which left him vulnerable to the knockout and that he would not make that mistake again. Chuck said he was looking to knockout Randy for a second time. The two exchanged strikes for the majority of the first round with Liddell getting a cut above his eye and Couture receiving a broken nose by an uppercut. Couture then stole the first round with two successful takedowns at the end of the round. The second round went much the same way with both fighters keeping the fight on the feet. As Couture lunged forward with a telegraphed big right hand, Liddell sidestepped and caught Couture with a big right hook to the chin. Couture fell to his knees and Liddell pounce with several more strikes to the head. The referee stepped in and stopped the fight at 1:28 of the second and ruled Liddell the winner by TKO.

Immediately following the fight in a post-fight interview with UFC commentator Joe Rogan, Couture announced his retirement from professional mixed martial arts, although he would continue as a UFC commentator and a coach for MMA fighters.

== Aftermath ==
Following their rubber match, both fighters continued to be very visible figures in the MMA world, with Liddell as the reigning UFC Light heavyweight Champion and Couture as an MMA commentator and coach. Liddell would go on to defend his belt multiple times before losing it to Quinton Jackson at UFC 71. Couture would eventually come out of retirement to fight and defeat Tim Sylvia at UFC 68 for the UFC Heavyweight Title. Both began making multiple appearances in movies and television shows which helped mixed martial arts grow even more in popularity. "The Iceman" has recently retired after a three fight losing streak against fellow former UFC Light Heavyweight Champions Rashad Evans, Mauricio Rua, and former UFC Middleweight Champion Rich Franklin. Couture would continue fighting until the age of 47 and go on a three fight win streak including victories over Brandon Vera, fellow UFC Hall of Famer and former UFC Heavyweight Champion Mark Coleman, and 11 time boxing champion James Toney. "The Natural" would fight fellow former UFC Light Heavyweight Champion Lyoto Machida at UFC 129. After a brutal flying front kick knockout, Couture would once again declare his resignation from Mixed martial arts at the age of 47.

Today, many sports and media analysts credit Couture and Liddell for bringing mixed martial arts into the mainstream of American sports and entertainment. During this time, Couture joined MMA legends Royce Gracie, Ken Shamrock and Dan Severn by becoming the fourth inductee into the UFC Hall of Fame. Liddell joined Couture when he was inducted into the Hall of Fame in July 2009.

== See also ==
- Tito Ortiz vs. Ken Shamrock
- Forrest Griffin vs. Stephan Bonnar
- Wanderlei Silva vs. Quinton Jackson
