= Liddle (disambiguation) =

Liddle is a surname. It may also refer to:

- Liddle Brook, a river in Delaware County in New York
- Liddle Burnt Mound, a Bronze Age site on the island of South Ronaldsay, Orkney
- USS Liddle (DE-206), a Buckley-class destroyer escort of the United States Navy
- Liddle Towers (1936–1976), electrician and amateur boxing coach

== See also ==
- Liddle's syndrome, autosomal dominant disorder that mimics hyperaldosteronism
- Liddle Kiddle, a doll produced by Mattel Inc. Toymakers
- Liddell (disambiguation)
- Lidl, a German supermarket chain
