= Tito Ortiz vs. Ken Shamrock =

Mixed martial arts rivalries

"The Huntington Beach Bad Boy" Tito Ortiz vs. "The World's Most Dangerous Man" Ken Shamrock is a mixed martial arts trilogy and rivalry. It is regarded as one of the biggest feuds in MMA history. All three fights took place under Ultimate Fighting Championship in the United States. All three fights have ended in technical knockout with one of them having been for the UFC Light Heavyweight Championship.

At the first meeting at UFC 40, Ortiz won by technical knockout due to corner stoppage following the third round. By this victory he retained the UFC Light Heavyweight Championship. The second time, after The Ultimate Fighter 3, at UFC 61 Ortiz won the rematch by technical knockout at 1:18 in the very first round. At the third and final match-up, Ortiz once again won, making it 3–0 for himself, by technical knockout at 2:22 in the first round.

In 2012, UFC owner Lorenzo Fertitta described the feud; "A lot of it had to do with their personalities - Ortiz was young, he was brash, he was irreverent. Ken Shamrock was a guy who was well-respected, had accomplished a lot in this sport."

== Background ==
The feud began to build on January 8, 1999, at UFC 18. After upsetting top UFC fighter and Lion's Den member Jerry Bohlander, Ortiz, with his fingers, acted like he was shooting at the Lion's Den corner and coach Ken Shamrock and additionally put on a disrespectful shirt in the octagon after the fight with Bohlander which read "I just f**ked your ass".

On March 5, 1999, at UFC 19, the feud with Ortiz exploded in one of the biggest and most famous altercations in mixed martial arts history. After Ortiz won a referee stoppage in his rematch with Guy Mezger, Ortiz immediately flipped off the Lion's Den corner and then put on a shirt that said "Gay Mezger is my Bitch". The actions by Ortiz shocked and stunned the MMA world because at the time, the Lion's Den was highly respected and arguably the most elite fight team in MMA and was composed of numerous top fighters. At the top was the leader, Ken Shamrock, who at the time still held a reputation as being one of the scariest and most skilled fighters associated with the UFC.

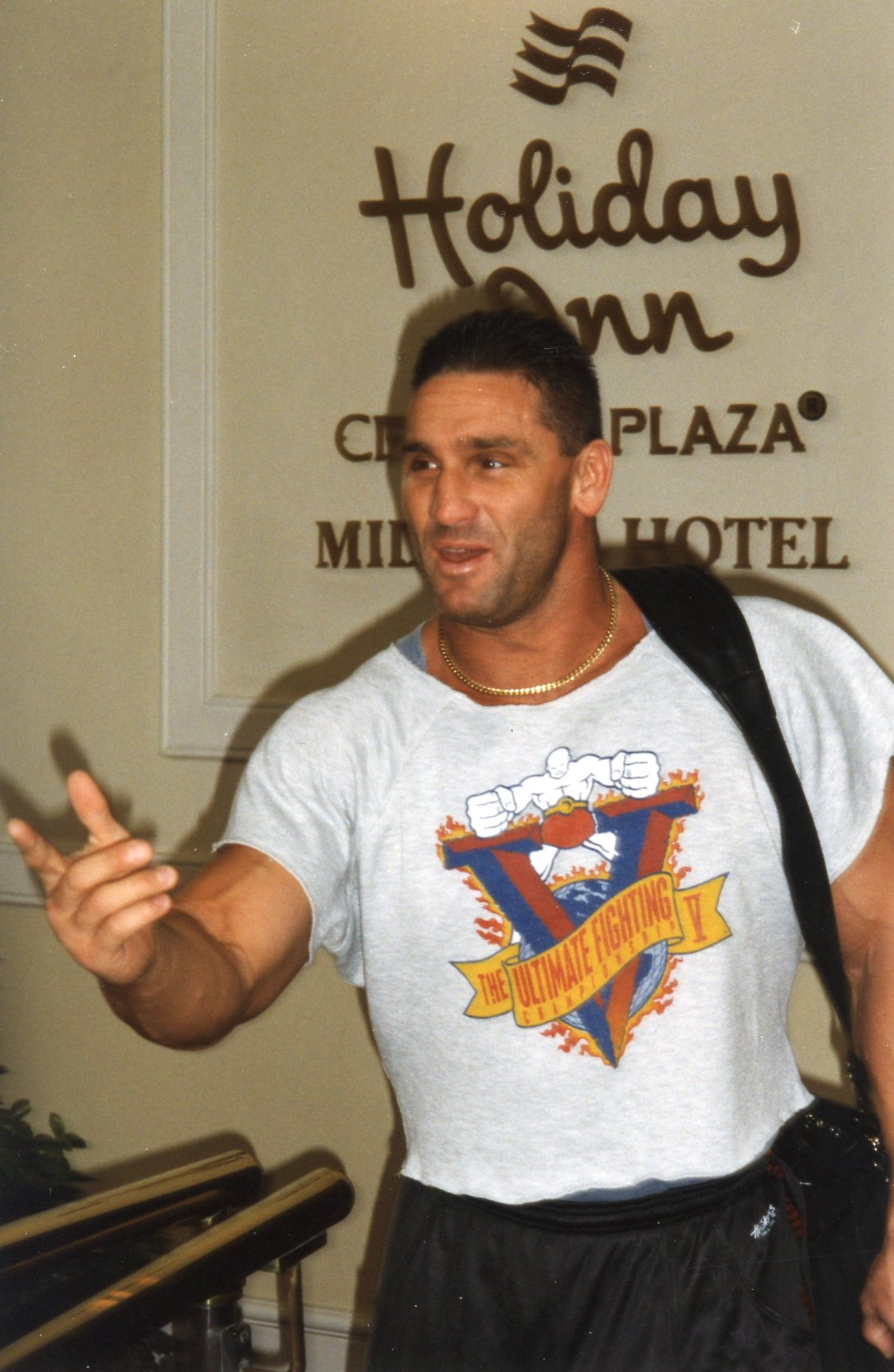
Shamrock, pictured here in 1998, weighed as much as 245 lb (111 kg; 17.5 st) in the late 1990s during the time when his feud with Tito Ortiz began.

After Shamrock saw the shirt, he yelled into the octagon "Hey Tito, don't let me see you wearing that shirt!". Shamrock then famously leaped onto the top of the cage, screaming at Ortiz and angrily waving his finger in Ortiz's face. Referee John McCarthy picked Ortiz up and carried him across the octagon to prevent the situation from escalating further, as a livid Shamrock was on the verge of jumping into the octagon.

Shamrock, who was still in the WWF at the time, was furious after the event. UFC matchmaker Joe Silva said: "SEG knew this was bad. Ken was really freaking out. Tables were getting flipped, who knows what was going to happen. So they have to usher Tito back to a room and get him away from the Lion's Den. It was craziness, everybody was just looking at each other and saying, 'Did I see that right? Did that shirt really say what I thought that it said?' Everybody's freaking out about it...there was such a buzz about it, everybody was running around everywhere." Silva added, "When I think back and remember all the cool things, all the exciting and crazy things in the UFC, that night is definitely burned into my memory."

Ortiz's manager, Sal Garcia, added: "one of the other fighters comes in at that point and says, 'hey, Ken Shamrock and the Lion's Den, they want to come over and kick Tito and Sal's asses.'" The tension backstage was so great that some feared a brawl between the Lion's Den and Tito Ortiz, Kevin Randleman, Mark Coleman and others from the Hammer House (who were in Ortiz's locker room after the event). The situation was escalated to the point that police and security had to be called in to monitor the situation. Jeff Sherwood, creator of Sherdog, wrote after the event: "Someone needs to remind Ken Shamrock that it wasn't Monday Night Raw out there. Not saying he wouldn't tear Tito up though."

Sherwood was not alone in his opinion that Shamrock would have been too much for Ortiz to deal with at the time. Shamrock had a reputation of thoroughly and brutally dominating everybody in training at the Lion's Den, including top UFC fighters Guy Mezger and Jerry Bohlander, and Shamrock, at north of 240 lb (110 kg; 17 st), was considerably larger than Ortiz and would be a full weight class above him. Ortiz also expressed reluctance in confronting Shamrock, saying shortly after UFC 19:

"Ken Shamrock is a big boy, I don't know if I want to tangle with him." -Tito Ortiz, March 5, 1999

Many fans were upset that this fight probably would never happen due to the weight difference. However, over time, Shamrock began to lose size and by the time he fought Don Frye three years later in 2002, Shamrock was down to around 220 lbs, making it possible to cut weight to 205.

== UFC 40: Vendetta ==
- Date: November 22, 2002
- Titles on the line: UFC Light Heavyweight Championship

Tale of the tape
Boxer	(United States) Tito Ortiz	(United States) Ken Shamrock
Nickname	The Huntington Beach Bad Boy	The World's Most Dangerous Man
Hometown	Huntington Beach, California	Reno, Nevada
Pre-fight record	9–2	25-7-2
Recognition	UFC Light Heavyweight Champion	

Result
- Ortiz wins by technical knockout at 5:00 of round 3

On November 22, 2002, at UFC 40, nearly four years after the confrontation at UFC 19, Shamrock returned to the UFC for the first time since December 1996 to fight Ortiz in a title match for the UFC Light Heavyweight Championship in one of the biggest, most anticipated and most important fights in UFC history. By this time, Shamrock's skills had diminished significantly due to injuries and aging but he was still considered to be a very dangerous and strong opponent. Although it was understood that Shamrock was past his prime, many people gave Shamrock a good chance to win based on his size (Ortiz had not fought someone as big as Shamrock to that point in his career), punching power, wrestling skill and submission skill. Shamrock's apparent size advantage did not factor into the fight, however; Shamrock experienced difficulty cutting weight for the first time and cut too much weight, weighing in at 201 lbs, 4 lbs under the 205 lb. limit. Ortiz shed light upon his feelings before the fight in his book This is Gonna Hurt: The Life of a Mixed Martial Arts Champion: "Ken Shamrock is a real good fighter. I was not intimidated by him, but I guess you can say I was a little bit afraid."

Color commentator Joe Rogan called the fight a "dream match" and "the most incredible night in mixed martial arts history" at the start of the show and admitted that he had no idea who was going to win the fight. The hype and buzz surrounding the MGM Grand Garden Arena for the event was unlike anything mixed martial arts had ever seen before. The event was also monumental for the future of the UFC and the sport as a whole in America for a variety of reasons. UFC 40 sold out the MGM Grand Arena and sold 150,000 pay per view buys, a rate over three times larger than the previous Zuffa events. It also garnered mainstream attention from massive media outlets such as ESPN and USA Today, something that was unfathomable for mixed martial arts at that point in time. Many have suggested that the success of UFC 40 and the anticipation for Ken Shamrock vs. Tito Ortiz saved the UFC from bankruptcy; the buyrates of the previous Zuffa shows averaged a mere 45,000 buys per event and the company was suffering deep monetary losses. The commercial success of UFC 40 provided a glimmer of hope for the UFC and kept alive the dream that mixed martial arts could become big.

Although many in the mixed martial arts media either deemed the fight too close to call or gave a slight edge to the younger Ortiz, the fight was not nearly as close as originally expected. Ortiz managed to hurt Shamrock numerous times in the first with knees and punches in the clinch, though Shamrock managed to briefly drop Ortiz to one knee with a punch of his own. Ortiz recovered shortly after and went on to dominate the fight with takedowns and ground and pound. The manner in which Ortiz easily secured numerous takedowns was surprising to some because Shamrock had displayed excellent wrestling and takedown defense throughout his career to that point. In addition, the fighters at the Lion's Den claimed that nobody took Shamrock down in training. Shamrock provided excitement for the crowd at the end of rounds 2 and 3, dramatically scrambling to his feet after being dominated from his back, but was unable to mount any significant offense after getting up. Right before Round 4 started, Shamrock's cornerman threw in the towel and Ortiz had successfully defended the UFC light heavyweight championship.

After the fight was over, Shamrock revealed that he fought Ortiz with a serious knee injury (a torn ACL). Shamrock's ACL injury explained his ineffective wrestling in the fight, which had been an enormous strength for Shamrock throughout his career prior to the Ortiz fight. Bruce Buffer has said on various occasions that this fight was one of the greatest fights he has ever seen and that the energy from the crowd that night was one of the greatest feelings he has ever experienced. Buffer also compared Shamrock and Ortiz's first fight with boxing's "Fight of the Century" in Ali vs. Frazier.

== Significance of UFC 40 ==
UFC 40 proved to be the most critical event to date in the Zuffa era. The event sold out the MGM Grand Arena and sold 150,000 pay per view buys, a rate over three times larger than the previous Zuffa events. The event featured a card headlined by a highly anticipated championship grudge match between then-current UFC Light Heavyweight Champion Tito Ortiz and former UFC Superfight Champion Ken Shamrock, who had previously defected to professional wrestling in the WWE before returning to MMA. It was the first time the UFC hit such a high mark since being forced "underground" in 1997. UFC 40 also garnered mainstream attention from massive media outlets such as ESPN and USA Today, something that was unfathomable for mixed martial arts at that point in time. Many have suggested that the success of UFC 40 and the anticipation for Ortiz vs. Shamrock saved the UFC from bankruptcy; the buyrates of the previous Zuffa shows averaged a mere 45,000 buys per event and the company was suffering deep monetary losses. The success of UFC 40 provided a glimmer of hope for the UFC and kept alive the dream that mixed martial arts could become big. Long time UFC referee "Big" John McCarthy said that he felt UFC 40 was the turning point in whether or not the sport of MMA would survive in America.

"When that show (UFC 40) happened, I honestly felt like it was going to make it. Throughout the years, things were happening, and everything always looked bleak. It always looked like, this is it, this is going to be the last time. This is going to be the last year. But, when I was standing in the Octagon at UFC 40, I remember standing there before the Ortiz/Shamrock fight and looking around. The energy of that fight, it was phenomenal, and it was the first time I honestly said, it's going to make it." -"Big" John McCarthy

== UFC 61: Bitter Rivals ==
- Date: July 8, 2006
- Title on the line: None

Tale of the tape
Boxer	(United States) Tito Ortiz	(United States) Ken Shamrock
Nickname	The Huntington Beach Bad Boy	The World's Most Dangerous Man
Hometown	Huntington Beach, California	Reno, Nevada
Pre-fight record	13–4	26–10-2

Result
- Ortiz wins by technical knockout at 1:18 of round 1

Ortiz went on to face Randy Couture at UFC 44 for the undisputed UFC Light Heavyweight Championship in September 2003. Ortiz was the favorite going into the fight. Despite this, Couture won a unanimous decision in dominant fashion and became the undisputed UFC light heavyweight champion. The loss ended Ortiz's near three-and-a-half-year title reign. Following his loss to Couture, Ortiz faced Chuck Liddell at UFC 47, losing by second-round knockout. After six months off, Ortiz returned and took a unanimous decision victory over newcomer Patrick Côté at UFC 50 and a split decision over Vitor Belfort at UFC 51. Ortiz than fought against previous The Ultimate Fighter 1 winner Forrest Griffin on April 15, 2006. Ortiz won via split decision.

On November 21, 2003, at UFC 45, Shamrock, along with Royce Gracie, became the first inductees to the UFC Hall of Fame. The event celebrated the 10th anniversary of the UFC. UFC President Dana White said;

"We feel that no two individuals are more deserving than Royce and Ken to be the charter members. Their contributions to our sport, both inside and outside the Octagon, may never be equaled."

After a two-year layoff to recover from ACL surgery, a 40-year-old Shamrock returned to fight the 244 lb (111 kg; 17.4 st) Kimo Leopoldo at UFC 48 in a rematch of the UFC 8 Superfight Championship match. Kimo was coming off an impressive win over Shamrock's longtime rival, Tank Abbott. Shamrock won the bout in the first round by KO via knee to the head. Shamrock's knee strike to Kimo's chin was so hard that he opened up a cut on his knee after landing the shot. Shamrock's mega drawing power was evident when the pay per view numbers came out for the event; UFC 48 amazingly drew more pay per view buys than the ultra hyped mega fight between mixed martial arts stars Chuck Liddell and Tito Ortiz one event earlier at UFC 47.

Shamrock then faced rising star and future UFC Middleweight Champion Rich Franklin in the main event in a light heavyweight bout on the popular reality series The Ultimate Fighter finale on April 9, 2005. Shamrock reportedly originally signed to fight Ortiz in a rematch at this event but Ortiz would not sign the contract to fight Shamrock again. The event was a monumental moment in UFC history because it was the first ever UFC appearance on basic cable TV. Franklin defeated Shamrock by a TKO in the first round after taking advantage of a Shamrock slip while executing a high kick. At 41 years old, this was the first time Shamrock had ever been knocked out in a mixed martial arts fight in his career. Franklin's win over an icon like Shamrock propelled him into UFC stardom and established him as one of the organization's biggest stars. On October 24, 2005, Shamrock lost to fellow mixed martial arts legend Kazushi "The Gracie Hunter" Sakuraba in Pride: Fully Loaded, by TKO.

The years following the first bout, the rivalry between Ortiz and Shamrock remained very heated. Shamrock hassled UFC president Dana White for a second fight, even going as far to openly challenge Ortiz to a fight following Ortiz's victory over Belfort. Ortiz himself confronted Shamrock at the UFC 48 press conference, stating to Shamrock: "If you'd like to come down to 205, I'd love to give you another ass whooping." By the end of 2005, fan interest was still very high to see the two fight again. Shamrock accused Ortiz of avoiding a rematch, citing that Ortiz had been offered a fight with Shamrock numerous times yet refused to sign the contract to fight Shamrock. Ortiz also refused to fight Shamrock at heavyweight. On November 19, 2005, at UFC 56, Dana White, the UFC president, announced that Ortiz finally agreed to face Shamrock in a rematch. Shamrock would be one of the coaches (along with Tito Ortiz) for the upcoming third season of The Ultimate Fighter.

Leading up to the fight, Shamrock stated that the fight meant everything to him and that he would be the bully this time and capitalize on Ortiz's mistakes. Ortiz went on to say that his goal in 2006 was to defeat Chuck Liddell and regain the UFC Light Heavyweight Championship but that he would first dismantle Shamrock.

On July 8, 2006, at UFC 61, the highly anticipated rematch between Shamrock and a heavily favored Tito Ortiz took place. The pay per view numbers set North American MMA records with 775,000 buys on pay-per-view and a $3.4 million gate. Not everyone, however, was thrilled with the fight. At 42 years old, Shamrock was significantly past his prime and no longer a championship caliber fighter. Former UFC owner Bob Meyrowitz said;

"I didn't like seeing Ken Shamrock fight Tito Ortiz the second time. It is a very difficult thing for a great athlete to, perhaps, comprehend that their time is past. And it's hardest of all for a fighter. Boxing is full of stories where somebody just fights when they really shouldn't any longer."

A small incident between Shamrock and Ortiz took place prior to the fight at the UFC 61 weigh-ins. After Shamrock weighed in at 206, Ortiz threw a fit, arguing that the fight contract was clear about the weight limit being 205. Nevada State rules, however, allow a fighter in a non-title match to go over the limit by one pound, so Shamrock's weight was not against the rules. Ironically, Ortiz proceeded to weigh in at 206.5 lbs. and had to drop the half-pound before weighing in again.

Shamrock lost the rematch with Ortiz in 1:18 of the first round by a technical knockout in a fight that ended in chaotic controversy. Shamrock came out firing, landing a combination of punches to back Ortiz into the cage, but Ortiz successfully secured a double leg takedown on Shamrock, lifting him up and slamming him to the mat. Although Shamrock was now on his back in a disadvantageous position, he did have Ortiz in his full guard. Ortiz, while in Shamrock's full guard, was able to land several elbows to Shamrock's head which went undefended. Referee Herb Dean deemed that Shamrock was no longer able to intelligently defend himself and stopped the fight. Watching the slow-mo, Shamrock did go limp from one elbow but revived for the next. Shamrock and the crowd were furious at the early stoppage and Dana White immediately put together a rematch on television.

== Ortiz vs. Shamrock 3: The Final Chapter ==
- Date: October 10, 2006
- Title on the line: None

Tale of the tape
Boxer	(United States) Tito Ortiz	(United States) Ken Shamrock
Nickname	The Huntington Beach Bad Boy	The World's Most Dangerous Man
Hometown	Huntington Beach, California	Reno, Nevada
Pre-fight record	14–4	26–11-2

Result
- Ortiz wins by technical knockout at 2:22 of round 1

On October 10, 2006, at Ortiz vs. Shamrock 3: The Final Chapter, a 42-year-old Shamrock was a massive underdog to the significantly younger Ortiz. Shamrock was dominated again by Ortiz by KO after referee John McCarthy stopped the fight following multiple undefended fist strikes. The fight took place live on Spike TV. The two-hour broadcast drew a 3.1 overall rating, with the main event of Tito Ortiz vs. Ken Shamrock drawing a 4.3 rating. Quoting MMA Weekly's Ivan Trembow, "That breaks down to an amazing 5.7 million viewers for the Ortiz vs. Shamrock fight. This shatters the UFC's previous record for the number of people watching a UFC fight at any given time." The overall ratings record would not be matched until UFC 75 on September 8, 2007. Immediately after the fight, Ortiz initially celebrated his victory with a mocking "grave digger" routine and an offensive T-shirt that said, "Punishing Him into Retirement" after giving him the finger. However, Shamrock approached Ortiz and, after the two talked for several seconds, Shamrock said they could put all of their animosity aside as it was always "just business", shaking hands and burying the hatchet. Ortiz then declared that facing Shamrock had made him a better fighter and thanked Ken for "passing the torch". Ortiz added in his post-fight interview that he has always looked up to Shamrock. Shamrock gave a gracious speech after the fight but left it ambiguous whether he would retire from the sport. In an interview with Sherdog.com, he stated he was not leaning one way or another whether he will not fight again, but he did not want to lead the fans on. Ken also expressed his feelings after the match:

"I thought I was going to be able to put on more of a fight, but reality sets in and I have to realize that I just don't have the skills I used to have or the strength I used to have...I guess you come to a point where you figure, wow, I'm just not the same person I was. In my heart and my mind I'm still a competitor, but my body's just not following. I just can't compete with these guys anymore."

UFC President Dana White said the day after Shamrock's fight with Ortiz, "Last night was a turning point for the UFC. This will further drive the evolution of mixed martial arts into a mainstream sport."

Spike TV President Kevin Kay credited Shamrock's third fight with Ortiz as the beginning of mainstream advertisers coming into mixed martial arts. Kay said, "What [the Ortiz-Shamrock ratings] woke people up to was there's an opportunity for 18-34s that is unexploited, and 18-to-34-year-old guys love this...I think one was it did, as you said, wake up the press to [the fact that] there's something going on here that was unexpected." Kay added, "when those numbers hit for Shamrock-Ortiz, it was, like, “We have to pay attention, and this is clearly getting a loyal young 18-34.” I think that was the beginning of more mainstream advertisers coming in to Spike and coming to the mixed martial arts."

Ultimately, Shamrock's feud with Ortiz was critically important for the UFC's future and present day success. Shamrock and Ortiz's trilogy, along with the emergence of stars like Chuck Liddell and Randy Couture, resulted in the sport's explosion into the mainstream.

== Aftermath ==
Following their third fight, Ortiz went on to face Chuck Liddell in a rematch for the UFC Light Heavyweight Championship at UFC 66 where he lost via technical knockout. Follow the bout, Ortiz cumulated a record 0-4-1 with losses to Lyoto Machida, Forrest Griffin, and Matt Hamill, and a draw with Rashad Evans, making Shamrock the last win inside the octagon until 2011. Following his loss to Machida, Ortiz left the UFC, citing his frustrations with president Dana White as a major factor but has since returned as of August 2009 and fought Ryan Bader at UFC 132 where he defeated him via submission in the first round. The victory snapped Ortiz's 5-year skid without a win.

Shamrock, meanwhile, after a brief retirement, was rumored to face Michael Bisping at UFC 75 but was ultimately released from his UFC contract. Shamrock returned to fighting in 2008 and lost to Robert Berry via technical knockout. He then defeated Ross Clifton on February 13, 2009, via submission and was scheduled to face former WWE wrestler Bobby Lashley in an MMA bout, but tested positive for steroids after the Clifton fight in which he served a one-year suspension. He then lost his next to bout to Pedro Rizzo via TKO. He would then go on to defeat Johnathan Ivey via unanimous decision and lose to Mike Bourke via technical knockout due to a leg injury. Shamrock was to have competed against Boxing's Heavyweight Champion James Toney in a specialized MMA bout in Fall 2011, but it did not materialize. Since his return, Shamrock has received much criticism for fighting too far past his prime and has currently won 3 out of his last 12 fights.

== See also ==
- Randy Couture vs. Chuck Liddell
- Forrest Griffin vs. Stephan Bonnar
- Wanderlei Silva vs. Quinton Jackson
