= Liddell (disambiguation) =

Liddell is a surname.

Liddell may also refer to:

== Places ==
- Lake Liddell
- Liddell, New South Wales
- Liddell Archeological Site
- Lidell Creek
- Liddell Power Station, a coal-powered thermal power station

== Other uses ==
- Lidell Townsell, house-music artist
- Studio Liddell, a British computer animation and imagery production studio

== See also ==
- Liddel (disambiguation)
