= Ledell =

Ledell is a given name. Notable people with the name include:

- Ledell Eackles (born 1966), American basketball player
- Ledell Lee (1965–2017), American convicted murderer
- Ledell Titcomb (1866–1950), American baseball player

== See also ==
- Liddell
