= Robert Liddell (disambiguation) =

Robert Liddell (1908–1992) was an English literary critic, biographer, novelist, travel writer and poet.

Robert Liddell may also refer to:

- Robert Liddell (politician) (1837–1893), mayor of Pittsburgh
- Robert Scotland Liddell (1885–1972), British reporter and photographer
