= Liddle =

Liddle is a surname. Notable people with the surname include:

== Businesspeople ==
- David Liddle, co-founder of Interval Research Corporation
- Donald Liddle (1906–1989), Scottish corporate director

== Scientists ==
- Andrew R. Liddle (born 1965), professor of astrophysics at the University of Sussex in Brighton
- Grant Liddle (1921–1989), American endocrinologist, and namesake of Liddle's syndrome
- Stephen Liddle, English professor of inorganic chemistry

== Sportspeople ==
- Ben Liddle (born 1998), English footballer
- Bobby Liddle (1908–1972), English footballer
- Brett Liddle (born 1970), golfer from South Africa
- Cain Liddle (born 1975), Australian rules footballer
- Chris Liddle (born 1984), English cricket player
- Craig Liddle (born 1971), English former footballer
- Danny Liddle (1912–1982), Scottish footballer
- Demi Liddle (born 1999), Australian footballer
- Don Liddle (1925–2000), American left-handed pitcher for the New York Giants
- Fred Liddle (1910–?), English professional association football
- Gary Liddle, footballer currently playing for Chesterfield
- Gavin Liddle (born 1963), English footballer
- Jack Liddle (1910–?), Canadian middle-distance runner
- Jacob Liddle (born 1996), Australian rugby league footballer
- James Liddle (1930–1959), South African cricketer
- Jim Liddle (born 1958), Scottish footballer
- Ken Liddle (1928–1998), English footballer
- Martin Liddle (born 1978), New Zealand wrestler
- Michael Liddle (born 1989), footballer
- Ned Liddle (1878–1968), English footballer
- Steve Liddle (born 1959), Major League Baseball bench coach for the Minnesota Twins
- Tom Liddle (1921–1994), English footballer

== Writers ==
- Madhulika Liddle (born 1973), Indian writer
- Peter Liddle, historian and author
- Rod Liddle (1960–2026), British journalist best known for his term as editor of BBC Radio 4's Today programme

== Others ==
- Catherine Liddle, Indigenous Australian executive and journalist
- Celeste Liddle (born 1978), Australian Indigenous feminist and unionist
- Jeremy Liddle, bass guitarist of Canadian pop punk band Faber Drive
- Kerrynne Liddle, Australian politician
- Peter Liddle (born 1940), English artist
- Roger Liddle, Baron Liddle, British political adviser
- Tony Liddle (born 1940), truck driver and tour guide
- William Liddle (1888–1959), pastoralist

== See also ==
- Liddell, another surname
