= Jones–Liddell feud =

Feud involving two families in Louisiana, USA

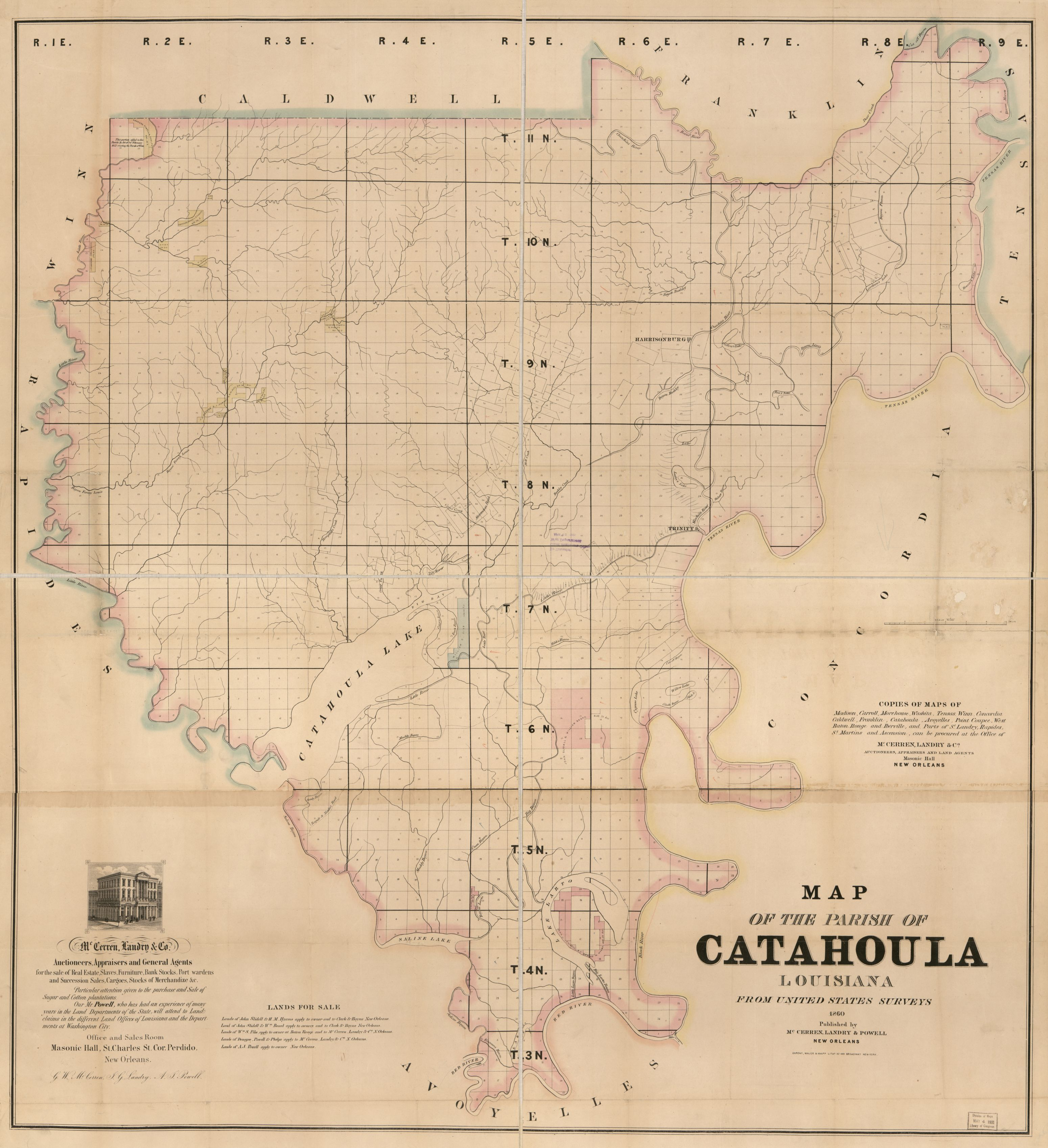
- Catahoula Parish in 1860, Location of the Jones–Liddell Feud
- Date: 1847–1870
- Caused by: Rivalry plantations; revenge killings

Parties
| The Liddell Family and southern sympathizers | The Jones Family and allies of reconstruction |

The Jones–Liddell feud (1847–1870) also known as the Liddell–Jones feud or the Black River War was a warring dispute between two prominent families from Catahoula Parish, Louisiana. It resulted in the death of at least six people, with other estimates suggesting as many as fourteen.

== Background ==
Personal allegiances to one faction or another, as well as sensationalized press accounts during and after the series of events provide for a variance of details concerning the Jones-Liddell feud. It was born, however, from disagreements between two individuals: Gen. St. John Richardson Liddell and Lt. Col. Charles Jones. Each of these men were members of the Whig Party in the 1850s, and held significant wealth leading up to the Civil War. Liddell was the second largest slave owner in Catahoula parish, with 115 slaves, while Jones owned 101 slaves. Each served as the patriarch of his respective family, with children who also would become participants in the feud. Both of these rivaling plantation owners arrived in Catahoula Parish at approximately the same time (1837–1840), and each would later serve in the Confederate Army. Following the war, however, Liddell remained a Democrat and defender of the antebellum social order. Jones, however, became a Republican convert, at a time when the federal government installed Republican loyalists in government across the state.

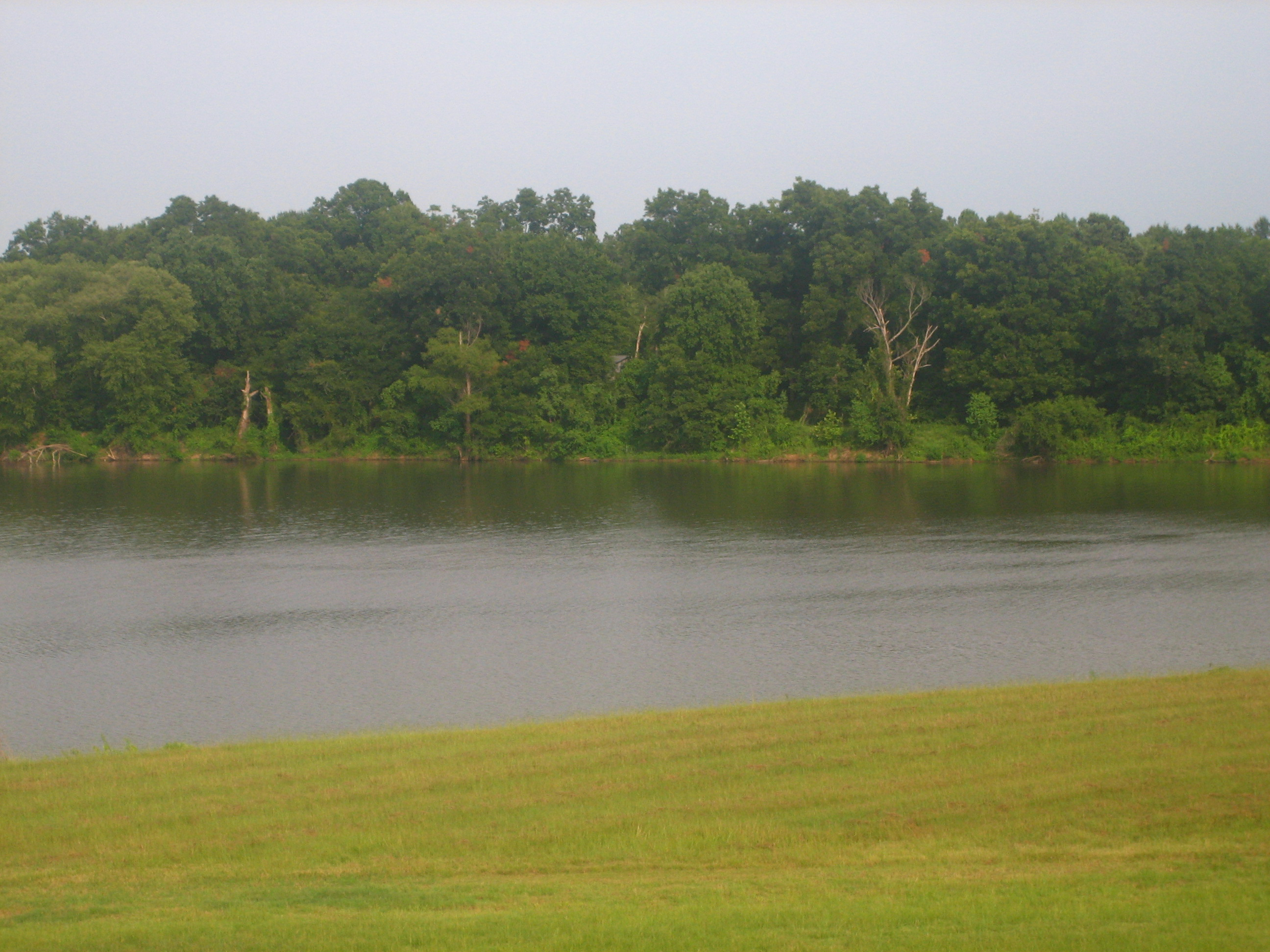
"Jonesville" is found at the place where the Ouachita, Tensas, and Little Rivers intersect. These three rivers become the Black River.

Liddell was the son of Moses Liddell, a wealthy plantation owner from Wilkinson County, Mississippi. After reaching the age of adulthood, he moved to Catahoula Parish on the Black River, and constructed a plantation which he named "Llanada" near Harrisonburg, Louisiana. Liddell had attended West Point, and was a personal friend of future Confederate President Jefferson Davis.

Jones was born in Kentucky, married in Ohio, and eventually settled in Catahoula Parish and established a plantation named "Troy," also on the Black River, approximately five miles south of Liddell's plantation. Jones was second in command of the 17th Volunteer Louisiana Infantry, but was injured early in the war.

== Antebellum ==
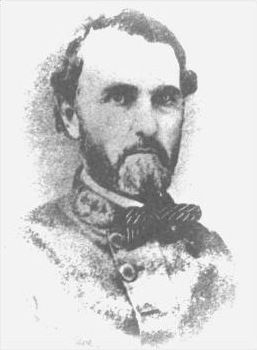
General St. John Richardson Liddell

=== Origin ===
According to Liddell, the origin of the feud involved a neighboring family to both Liddell and Jones. Phillip and Eliza Nichols, who were personal friends of the Liddell family, owned a prominent piece of land that Jones greatly coveted. Liddell's accounts suggest that Jones had publicly maligned the character and virtue of Mrs. Nichols. Mrs. Eliza Nichols made a personal request for Liddell to accompany her in confronting Jones about his efforts to disparage her character. Liddell agreed and together they confronted Jones at his home. As Mrs. Nichols approached Jones, however, she pulled out a pistol and shot him in the face, an action that Liddell claimed he did not expect from her, nor have prior knowledge of.

Jones was injured, but the gunshot did not kill him. According to Liddell, Jones solely placed the blame on Liddell rather than hold Mrs. Nichols as the responsible party for his injury. As Jones rested at home in recovery, rumors began to escalate that Jones was plotting a revenge attack on Liddell and his family. The tensions would continue to escalate, and each family found themselves consumed with fortifying their respective plantations, and stocking up on guns and ammunition. Residents in the community feverishly fueled these tensions, and unofficial factions began to form throughout the area.

Tensions between the two feuding families found a temporary reprieve, when Jones and his wife left for Ohio for a period of four years. Liddell suggested that Jones continued to send threats to Liddell during this time, stating his intention to return and kill him. In 1852, Jones made his return to his plantation on the Black River, accompanied by hired assassins, including one notoriously known as such by the name of Richard Pryor according to Liddell. Sam Smith, a nephew of Jones, added his name to the list of those publicly professing he would kill Liddell.

=== Murders of Wiggins and Glenn ===
Another Jones sympathizer by the name of Samuel Glenn made public threats against Liddell and his family. Liddell was tipped off that Glenn and Pryor were in town and had plans for another attempt on his life. On June 26, 1852, Samuel Glenn and a neighbor of Liddell's by the name of Moses Wiggins were ambushed by the road near "Trinity." Liddell admitted to having killed them both, but claimed that he mistook Moses Wiggins for Pryor. Liddell was arrested for murder. Liddell's friends and allies defended his actions due to the public threats that had been levied toward his life. Liddell hired well-established attorneys from Natchez, Louisiana. Despite two grand juries, Liddell was acquitted in 1854.

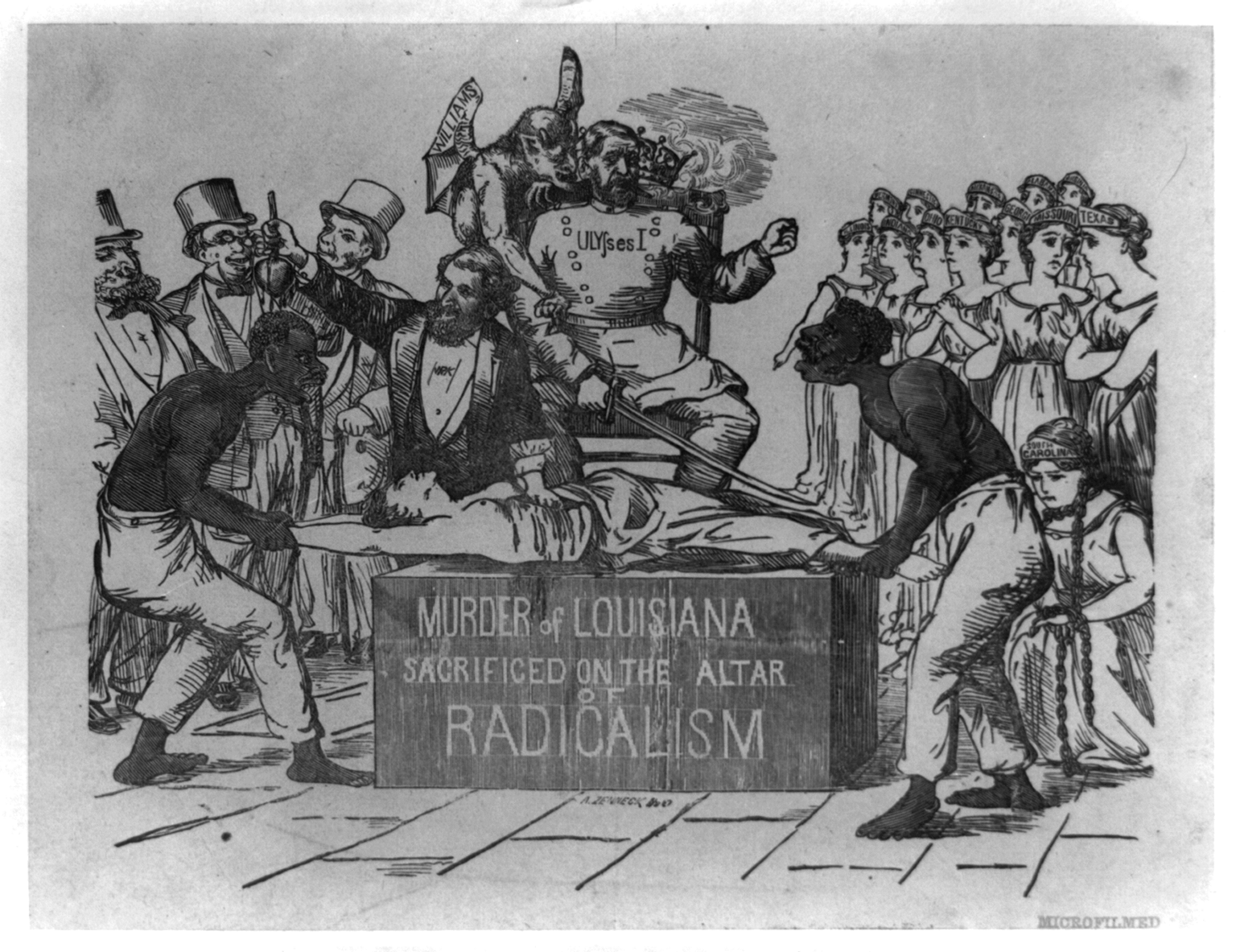
19th-century cartoon illustrating southern sentiments concerning Grant's reconstruction. "Murder of Louisiana sacrificed on the altar of radicalism."

The feud quieted down as a result of the American Civil War. Both Liddell and Jones each enlisted in support of the Confederate cause.

== Reconstruction Era ==
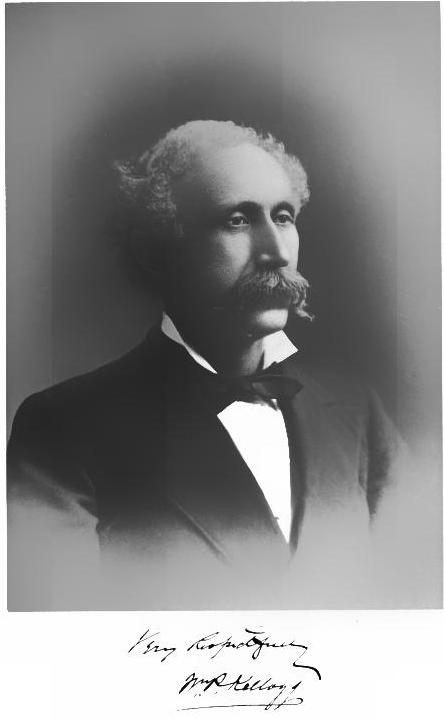
William Pitt Kellogg (December 8, 1830 – August 10, 1918) was an American lawyer and Republican Party politician who served as a United States Senator from 1868 to 1872 and from 1877 to 1883 and as the Governor of Louisiana from 1873 to 1877 during the Reconstruction Era.

Following the defeat of the Confederate States, both Liddell and Jones each returned home to try and salvage the once prosperous plantations. The economic fate of each man would be determined over the next five years largely by the political choices each made. According to Liddell:

During these early years of reconstruction, a political divide was created that ultimately resulted in terror and lawlessness throughout the south. With post-war government being installed by federal forces, southern sympathizers and loyal Democrats found themselves on the outside looking in. Only days before President Lincoln's assassination, he installed William Pitt Kellogg as the federal collector of customs in New Orleans. This began a twenty-year reign by the northerner in what became known as the Kellogg Government. Natives of the state resisted violently and violence occurred throughout the state.

=== Economic status ===
When Liddell returned to "Llanada" after the war, it was on the verge of financial ruins. No longer able to utilize slave labor, and with banks setup by northerners lending money at high interest rates, Liddell faced complete ruin, and would ultimately see his beloved Llanada forced into a sale at public auction, in order to cover Liddell's debts.

Jones on the other hand did not face the same economic fate. When Liddell's Llanada was placed up for auction, Jones began to negotiate with a third party to purchase the place. Upon discovering Jones' interest in acquiring his property, Liddell sent a warning to Jones, intimating bluntly that he could not stand for Jones to seize the property which held the graves of his dead family. Once again, tensions became heated between the two factions.

=== Assassination of Liddell ===
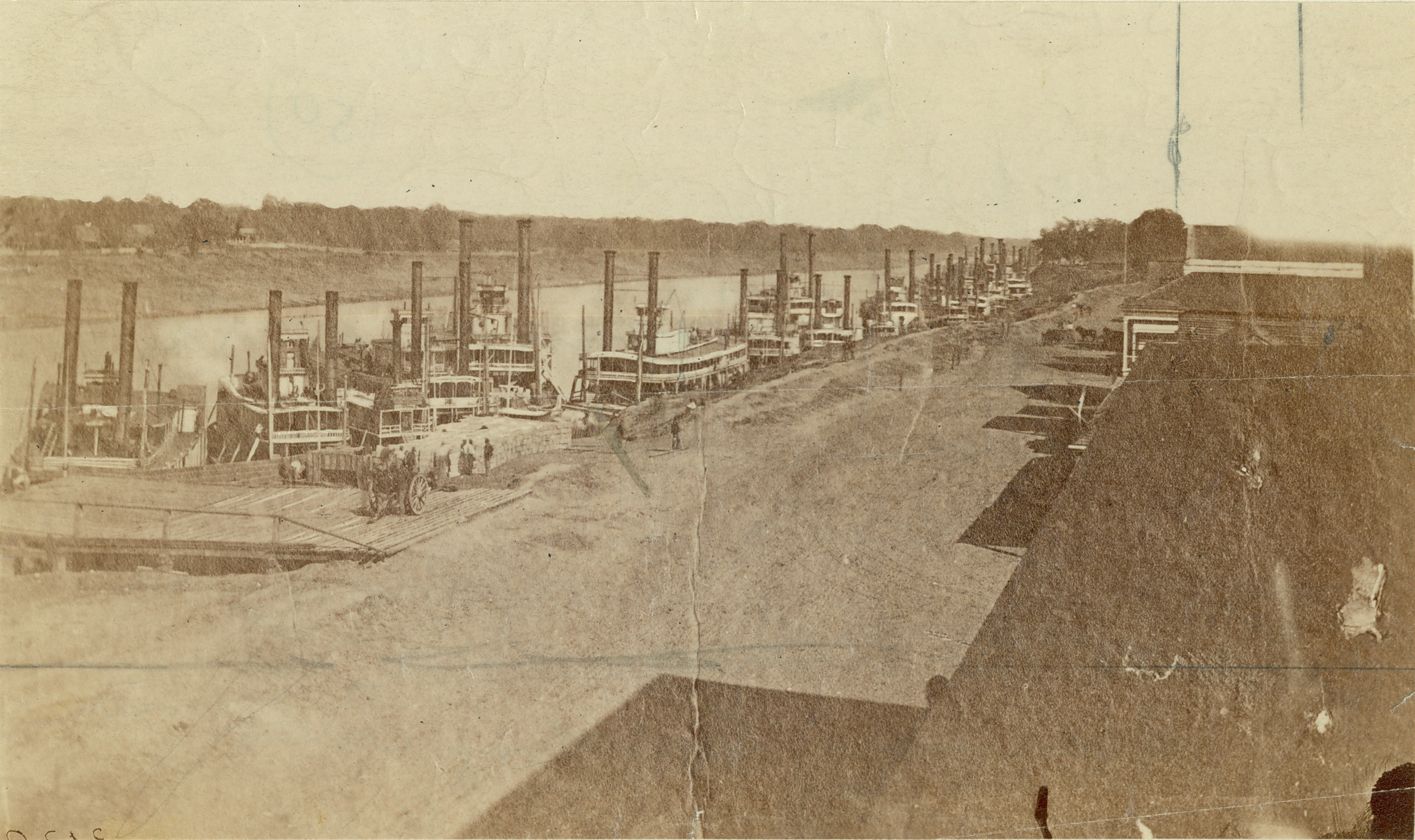
A steamer used for transport, such as those seen here, was the scene of Liddell's murder.

Both Liddell and Jones were frequent visitors to New Orleans, which could be reached by riverboat with moderate ease. In 1870, Liddell had boarded the steamer on the Black River heading to New Orleans. The captain knew that Jones had coincidentally also planned a trip to New Orleans and would be boarding the steamer. Sensing potential trouble ahead, he alerted Liddell of this news. Liddell had him send word to Jones that he should not board the steamer. Upon receiving this news, Jones gathered his sons and took off by horseback to a loading dock south of his own landing.

When the steamer pulled in at that place, Liddell was seated having lunch. Jones and his sons boarded the steamer and drew their weapons on Liddell. Upon seeing their entry, the captain alerted Liddell that the men were coming to murder him. Liddell rose to draw his weapon in defense, but Jones and his sons fired, killing Liddell instantly.

=== Jones' arrest and revenge ===
Upon hearing the news of Liddell's death, shock and horror enveloped the entire region. Jones and his sons were placed under arrest, but Sheriff Oliver Ballard, a Republican ally of Jones, allowed them to remain in custody at his personal home.

Days after the murder of Liddell, his son Moses "Judge" Liddell was traveling on a steamer near the Sheriff's home where Jones and his sons had been placed under house arrest. While passing this place, Moses Liddell saw Jones walking down near the river, and raised his gun and took aim. He fired upon Jones, making no excuse for himself other than retribution for the murder of his father. Moses Liddell's shot, however, did not kill Jones.

The local residents, who were largely Democrat-aligned and against the northern Reconstruction efforts, demanded retribution against Jones but suspected that none would come due to Jones' Republican political ties. A mob formed and stormed the place where Jones and his sons were being held. The mob ultimately killed Jones, as well as his son William. Others found at the place were spared. One son of Jones, Cuthbert Bullitt, slipped out of a second story window, and held on to the ledge, so as not to be found. His life was spared as a result.

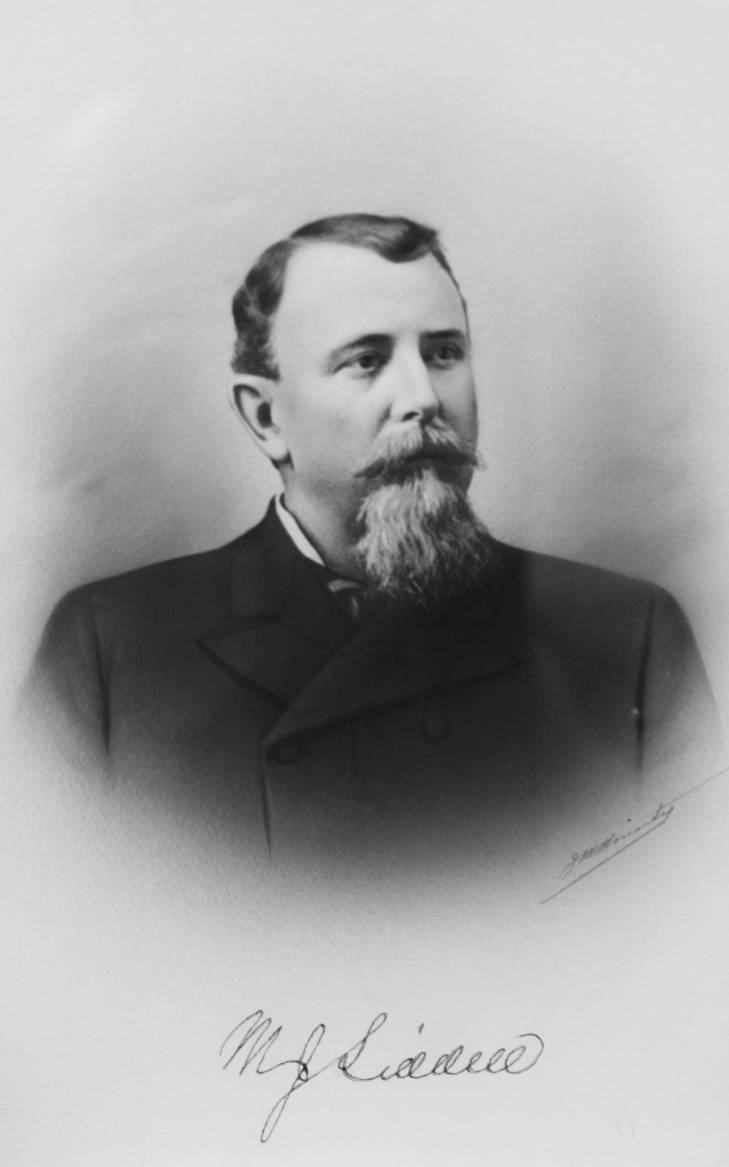
Judge Moses J. Liddell – Appointed Judge of the Supreme Court of the Montana Territory

The deaths from the mob were the last in the feud. Liddell was buried at Llanada plantation. Jones and his son were both interred on the family cemetery at his Everly Plantation.

== Aftermath ==
The community of Jonesville, Louisiana, was established near Everly plantation, after Jones' widow helped establish it. The area had been known as Trinity, but Jonesville became her name of choice for the new town.

Moses "Judge" Liddell moved his family from the area, taking residence in Richland Parish on the banks of Boeuf River. There he was elected to the Louisiana House of Representatives. He later moved to Monroe, and was appointed by Democratic President Grover Cleveland as a justice on the Supreme Court of territorial Montana.

Cuthburt Jones, having narrowly survived the lynch mob, made a trip to Washington, where he met with President Grant and relayed the tragic events of the feud. Being loyal and sympathetic to Jones, Grant appointed him as a consul to Tripoli in 1876. Louisiana Democrats later called upon President Grover Cleveland to rescind Cuthbert's consul appointment in 1885, alleging he was a "known murderer." He would go on, however, to have a distinguished career as a foreign diplomat, including time as the consul to Peru. Cuthbert Bullit Jones died in South America in 1905.

Francois Jones, the youngest son of Jones, also left Louisiana as a result of the feud. He became a prominent citizen in Washington, D.C, but drowned while attempting to cross a turbulent river near there in 1900.

In 2008, descendants of the family and residents of the surrounding areas gathered for a re-enactment of the events that took place in the Jones–Liddell feud.

== See also ==
- List of feuds in the United States
- Conclusion of the American Civil War
- Reconstruction Era
- Colfax massacre
