= Allan Liddell =

English cricketer

Allan Graham Liddell (2 May 1908 – 17 February 1970) was an English cricketer who played for Northamptonshire from 1927 to 1934. He was born and died in Northampton. He appeared in 91 first-class matches as a right-handed batsman who bowled right arm slow. He scored 2,355 runs with a highest score of 120 and took nine wickets with a best performance of four for 59. His son, Alan Liddell, also played first-class cricket for Northamptonshire.

== Notes and references ==
- S Canynge Caple (compiler). "Liddell, (Alan)". The Cricketers' Who's Who. Lincoln Williams (Publishers) Ltd. Adam Street, Adelphi, London. 1934. Pages 101 and 102.
