= St. John Richardson Liddell =

Confederate general

St. John R. Liddell
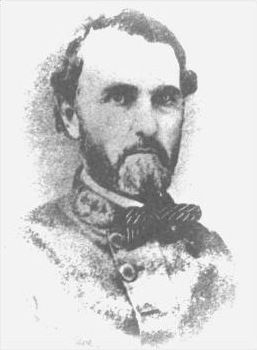
- Born: September 6, 1815; Wilkinson County, Mississippi
- Died: February 14, 1870 (aged 54); New Orleans, Louisiana
- Burial place: Llanada Plantation Cemetery, Jonesville, Louisiana
- Military career
- Allegiance: Confederate States of America
- Branch: Confederate States Army
- Service years: 1861–1865
- Rank: Brigadier General
- Commands: Arkansas Brigade; Liddell's Division; Sub-District of North Louisiana
- Conflicts: American Civil War

St. John Richardson Liddell (September 6, 1815 – February 14, 1870) was a prominent Louisiana planter who served as a general in the Confederate States Army during the American Civil War. He was an outspoken proponent of Southern emancipation of slaves in order to secure foreign assistance. Following the war, Liddell had a prominent feud with a former Confederate officer, Charles Jones, who eventually murdered Liddell near his home in 1870.

Liddell owned 115 slaves.

== Early life ==
Liddell was born to a wealthy plantation family near Woodville, Mississippi. He was a schoolmate of future Confederate President Jefferson Davis, whom he would interact with several times during the early years of the Civil War on behalf of fellow general Albert Sidney Johnston.

He attended the United States Military Academy from 1834 to 1835, but resigned prior to graduating. He was kicked out, according to a letter to his cousin John Guignard, "I have been unfortunately dismissed from West Point for two offenses—the one for having used a dagger too freely in personal contest, and the other for having unprovoked attempted to shoot a man, who had let fall some tint unguarded words, hostile to my feelings...."

Liddell then moved to Catahoula Parish and established his own prosperous plantation, "Llanada," near Harrisonburg, Louisiana. His famous feud with Charles Jones, known as the Jones-Liddell feud, which eventually led to his death, began in the 1850s.

== Civil War ==
=== Western Theater: 1861–63 ===
With the outbreak of the Civil War and Louisiana's secession, Liddell enlisted in the Confederate States Army and received a commission. He initially served as a staff officer to his close friend William J. Hardee and Albert Sidney Johnston during the early part of the conflict. He then commanded the famous Arkansas Brigade in Patrick Cleburne's division of the Army of Tennessee from 1862–63, including the battles of Perryville and Murfreesboro.

Liddell commanded a division at Chickamauga in 1863, but repeatedly refused promotion to major general in order to secure an assignment closer to his plantation, which was in jeopardy from Jayhawkers. Liddell was approached by General Braxton Bragg, a West Point classmate, to become his chief of staff and replace General W.W. Mackall, but Liddell refused. Although he was publicly critical of Bragg, Liddell seemed to enjoy his favor, which may have earned him the enmity of several of the officers in the Army of Tennessee. He remained very close with his classmate Hardee. Despite his personal clashes with fellow officers, Liddell had provided invaluable service to the Army of Tennessee. His brigade was pivotal at Perryville and Stones' River (where his sixteen-year-old son Willie Liddell was mortally wounded), and suffered the highest percentage of casualties at Chickamauga.

=== Trans-Mississippi Theater: 1863–65 ===
General Bragg refused to spare Liddell, but when Bragg was relieved by Jefferson Davis after the Chattanooga disaster, Liddell appealed personally to the President for a transfer and command of Sub-District of North Louisiana, which he received and held during the Red River Campaign in 1864. He was later assigned to overall command of the infantry at Mobile, Alabama until its surrender in 1865. During the last campaign, Liddell and Union Maj. Gen. E.R.S. Canby engaged in the Battle of Fort Blakeley, one of the last engagements of the war, where he was captured. Canby would later prove influential in Liddell's life by securing amnesty for him from the Federal Government.

During his Trans-Mississippi service, Liddell found himself in conflict with his immediate superior, Richard Taylor, the brother-in-law of President Davis, and regretted leaving the Army of Tennessee. In contrast to many modern historians, Liddell lays the blame for the Confederate failure to recapture the Mississippi or unite some 60,000 troops of their far Western Commands under Generals Magruder, Taylor, and Price with the Army of Tennessee on Taylor himself, rather than Edmund Kirby Smith. Unknown to Liddell, by late 1864 Generals Bragg, Hardee, and E.K. Smith made several petitions for Liddell's promotion to positions including James Mouton's Texas Division, and Hardee's Chief of Staff, but these were not acted on before the war drew to a close.

=== Liddell on slavery ===
Liddell held a reputation for being outspoken, and was well connected. In December 1864, he wrote a letter to Edward Sparrow, a Confederate Senator from Louisiana and chairman of the military Committee, expressing his conviction that the war was going against the Confederacy. He expressed the need for full emancipation of the slaves in order to secure foreign assistance. Although he admitted it may have been too late to act, he felt that emancipation may have also been a solution to the South's growing manpower crisis. Senator Sparrow showed the letter to General Robert E. Lee, who agreed with Liddell on all points, stating that "he could make soldiers out of any human being that had arms and legs."

== Postbellum career ==
In 1866, Liddell wrote his memoirs, in which he was highly critical of the Confederate leadership and his fellow officers, including Davis and Bragg. The memoirs themselves are actually a collection of several separate manuscripts, letters, and battlefield records, which he was unable to combine before he was murdered.

In them, his criticisms arise mainly from the failure of Bragg's subordinates, including Cleburne, Bishop Polk, John C. Breckinridge, Simon Bolivar Buckner, Joseph Wheeler, D.H. Hill, and James Longstreet, to support Bragg, which in the end leaves Liddell as one of the few writers of the period who was generous to Bragg. His writing reveals his minority opinion of praise for officers such as General John Floyd and Gideon Pillow, whom nearly all modern historians consider inept. He expresses disgust for Judah P. Benjamin, whom most historians consider one of the most able Confederate Cabinet officials.

He mentions several times the growing sense of futility he and other officers felt in the unlucky Army of Tennessee. It was plainly clear to them after the fall of Forts Henry and Donelson that their cause was doomed unless they could concentrate their forces and wage an offensive campaign; however, political intrigue always seemed to squander any gains made by the army. Liddell comes off as a fair, impartial officer, even proposing that had the south recruited generals like George H. Thomas, whom he considered the best Union Commander, things may have turned out differently.

Liddell refused promotion, and endeavored to help any officer he was assigned to, regardless of whether they were liked or not. He was opinionated and outspoken, yet his opinion was valued and he held the ear of the echelons of Confederate command, including Davis, A.S. Johnston, Bragg, and Hardee. He spent his vast personal fortune on equipping his own brigade, even though it was from a different state. The brigade itself was the only unit in the Army of Tennessee never to court-martial an enlisted soldier.

Liddell was murdered in 1870 by Col. Charles Jones in the culmination of a twenty-year real estate dispute. He was buried on his sprawling plantation in Louisiana. Jones was later murdered by supporters of Liddell in revenge for his death.

The St. John Richardson Liddell Chapter #271 of the Military Order of the Stars & Bars in Bay Minette, Alabama, was named for the former general.

== See also ==
- List of American Civil War generals (Confederate)
- List of Confederate States Army officers educated at the United States Military Academy
- Moses J. Liddell, his son
- List of United States Military Academy non-graduate alumni

== Sources ==
- Andrews, C. C. History of the Campaign of Mobile. New York, 1867.
- Anonymous. "The Jones-Liddell Feud." Unpublished Manuscript. Catahoula Parish Court House, Harrisonburg, La.
- Booth, Andrew B. Records of Louisiana Confederate Soldiers and Louisiana Confederate Commands. 3 colvs. New Orleans, 1920.
- Busbice, Roger L. "Catahoula Parish Rebel, Gen. St. John R. Liddell," North Louisiana History 15 (Winter 1984), pp. 49–52
- Connelly, Thomas L. Autumn of Glory: The Army of Tennessee 1862–1865. Baton Rouge: Louisiana State University Press, 1971. ISBN 978-0-8071-2738-4.
- Eicher, John H., and David J. Eicher, Civil War High Commands. Stanford: Stanford University Press, 2001. ISBN 978-0-8047-3641-1.
- Hughes Jr., Nathaniel C., and Liddell, St. John R., Liddell's Record, Louisiana State University Press, 1997, ISBN 978-0-8071-2218-1.
- Johnson, Ludwell H. Red River Campaign: Politics & Cotton in the Civil War. Kent, OH: Kent State University Press, 1993. ISBN 978-0-87338-486-5. First published Baltimore; The Johns Hopkins Press, 1958.
- Kane, Harnett T. The Bayous of Louisiana. New York, 1943.
- Lanza, Michael L. "The Jones-Liddell Feud." Red River Valley Historical Review II (Winter, 1975), 467ff.
- Maury, Dabney H. Recollections of a Virginian. New York, 1894.
- Richardson, Frank L. "The War as I Saw It, 1861-1865". Louisiana Historical Quarterly, VI (January, April, 1923), 86–106, 223ff.
- Roland, Charles P. Albert Sidney Johnston: Soldier of Three Republics. Lexington, KY: The University Press of Kentucky, 2001. Originally published: Austin: University of Texas Press, 1964. ISBN 978-0-8131-9000-6.
- Sifakis, Stewart. Who Was Who in the Civil War. New York: Facts On File, 1988. ISBN 978-0-8160-1055-4.
- United States War Department. The War of the Rebellion: a Compilation of the Official Records of the Union and Confederate Armies. Washington, DC: U.S. Government Printing Office, 1880–1901. OCLC 427057.
- Warner, Ezra J. (1959). Generals in Gray: Lives of the Confederate Commanders (1st ed.). Baton Rouge: Louisiana State University Press. OCLC 445052.
- Winters, John D. The Civil War in Louisiana. Baton Rouge: Louisiana State University Press, 1963. ISBN 978-0-8071-0834-5.
