= Tom Liddle =

English footballer

Personal information
- Full name: Thomas Blenkarn Liddle
- Date of birth: 22 April 1921
- Place of birth: Middleton-in-Teesdale, England
- Date of death: 28 October 1994 (aged 73)
- Place of death: Bournemouth, England
- Position: Full back

Senior career*
Years	Team	Apps	(Gls)
–1947	Hartlepools United		
1947–1948	Bournemouth & Boscombe Athletic	1	(0)
- Yeovil Town
- * Club domestic league appearances and goals

Thomas Blenkarn Liddle (22 April 1921 – 28 October 1994) was an English professional footballer who made one appearance in the Football League for Bournemouth & Boscombe Athletic as a full back.
