= Chekesha Liddell =

Materials scientist and engineer

Chekesha M. Liddell Watson
- Education: Georgia Institute of Technology, Bachelors of Materials Sciences (1999) Spelman College, Bachelors of Chemistry with Highest Distinctions (1999) Georgia Institute of Technology, Ph.D. in Materials Science and Engineering, Minor in Science and Technology Policy (2003)
- Scientific career
- Workplaces: Cornell University
- Doctoral advisor: Christopher Summers

Chekesha M. Liddell Watson (née Liddell) researches colloidal materials, and the relationship between micron and submicron length scales. She was an Associate Professor of Material Science and Engineering at Cornell University.

== Early life ==
Liddell grew up in Tallahassee, Florida. At an early age, her parents recognized her good comprehension for spatial relations. Since she was 8 years old, Liddell participated in math and science enrichment workshops. In high school, Liddell participated in a summer camp at the Massachusetts Institute of Technology for emerging minority scientists, as well as worked alongside and co-authored a paper with one of the Kennedy Space Center's top female scientists.

In 1999, Liddell graduated both from Spelman College, receiving a Bachelors of Science in Chemistry and graduating with Highest Distinction, as well as Georgia Institute of Technology, where she earned a Bachelors of Science in Materials Engineering. She was awarded a NASA Women in Science and Engineering Scholarship, which allowed her to study the metabolism of arsenic in poultry. During her scholarship she worked at Kennedy Space Center. After defending her thesis titled Non-spherical zinc sulfide colloids as building blocks for three-dimensional photonic crystals, She earned her PhD in Material Science at Georgia Institute of Technology in 2003. Liddell was awarded a $20,000 Career Initiation Grant from Georgia Institute of Technology.

== Research ==
Liddell creates photonic crystals for solar cells using colloidal building blocks. She has worked on the Self-assembly of microparticles with hemispherical and dimer shapes. Liddell joined the faculty of Cornell University in 2003. She is a member of the National Organization for the Professional Advancement of Black Chemists and Chemical Engineers. In 2006 she was awarded a National Science Foundation Career Award for Nonspherical, Active, and "Inverted" Bases for Optimized Photonic Crystal Design. This award resulted in 16 publications. In 2009 Liddell was awarded a Presidential Early Career Award for Scientists and Engineers. She was recognized as one of Cornell's Emerging Scholars in 2011.

== Awards and honors ==
- (2011) Emerging Scholars Class of 2011 (Diverse: Issues in Higher Education magazine)
- (2010) Provost's Award for Distinguished Research (Office of the Provost, Cornell University)
- (2009) Dow Distinguished Lecturer (University of California at Santa Barbara UCSB)
- (2007) Certificate of Appreciation for Mentoring (Alfred P. Sloan Foundation)
- (2007) Frontiers of Science Symposium Invitee (National Academy of Sciences (NAS) and Japan Society for the Promotion of Science)
- (2006) NSF CAREER Award: Nonspherical, Active, and "Inverted" Bases for Optimized Photonic Crystal Design
- (2003) Facilitating Academic Careers in Engineering and Sciences Career Initiation Grant
- (1999-2003) Office of Naval Research Graduate Fellowship
- (1999-2003) Georgia Tech President's Fellowship
- (1999-2003) Facilitating Academic Careers in Engineering and Sciences Fellowship
- (2000) National Society of Black Engineers (NSBE) Fellow
- (1999) Hertz Foundation Fellowship Grant
- (1999) TMS materials society, J. Keith Brimacombe Presidential Scholarship
- (1998) ASM Foundation Scholarship, ASM International materials
- (1999) ASTM, American Society for Testing and Materials, Mary R. Norton Memorial Fellowship
