= Liddel =

Liddel or Lidel may refer to:

== People ==
- Andreas Lidel (1740s–1780s), composer and virtuoso performer
- Darren Liddel (born 1971), weightlifting competitor for New Zealand
- Dick Liddil (1852–1901), American outlaw, member of the James-Younger Gang
- Duncan Liddel (1561–1613), Scottish mathematician, physician and astronomer

== Places ==
- Liddel Castle, ruined castle in Liddesdale, Roxburghshire in the Scottish Borders area of Scotland
- Liddel Strength, ancient monument near Carwinley, Cumbria, in northwest England
- Liddel Water, river running through southern Scotland and northern England

== See also ==
- Liddell
- Liddesdale, valley of Liddel Water
- Lidl
