= Alan Liddell =

English cricketer (1930–1972)

Personal information
- Full name: Alan William George Liddell
- Born: 8 August 1930; Northampton, Northamptonshire, England
- Died: 9 February 1972 (aged 41); Duston, Northamptonshire, England
- Batting: Right-handed
- Bowling: Right-arm medium
- Relatives: Allan Liddell (father)

Domestic team information
- Years: Team
- 1951–1955: Northamptonshire

Career statistics
Competition	First-class
Matches	18
Runs scored	201
Batting average	14.35
100s/50s	–/–
Top score	38*
Balls bowled	2,514
Wickets	24
Bowling average	58.29
5 wickets in innings	–
10 wickets in match	–
Best bowling	3/62
Catches/stumpings	4/–
- Source: Cricinfo, 6 August 2011

Alan William George Liddell (8 August 1930 – 9 February 1972) was an English cricketer. Liddell was a right-handed batsman who bowled right-arm medium pace. The son of Allan Liddell, who played first-class cricket for Northamptonshire, he was born in Northampton, Northamptonshire.

Liddell made his first-class debut for Northamptonshire against Derbyshire in the 1951 County Championship. He made 17 first-class further first-class appearances, the last of which came against Derbyshire in the 1955 County Championship. In his 18 first-class appearances, he scored 201 runs at an average of 14.35, with a high score of 38 not out. With the ball, he took 24 wickets at a bowling average of 58.29, with best figures of 3/62.

He died in Duston, Northamptonshire on 9 February 1972.
