= Ken Liddle =

English footballer

Personal information
- Full name: Kenneth Liddle
- Date of birth: 6 October 1928
- Place of birth: Gateshead, England
- Date of death: 21 January 1998 (aged 69)
- Place of death: Gateshead, England
- Position: Inside forward

Senior career*
Years	Team	Apps	(Gls)
1949–1950	Sunderland	0	(0)
1950–1951	Darlington	1	(0)
–	Spennymoor United		
- * Club domestic league appearances and goals

Kenneth Liddle (6 October 1928 – 21 January 1998) was an English footballer who played as an inside forward in the Football League for Darlington. He was on the books of Sunderland without playing League football for the club, and also played non-league football for Spennymoor United. Liddle joined Darlington from Sunderland at the end of the 1949–50 season on a free transfer. He made only one senior appearance for Darlington, replacing Harry Clark at inside left for the visit to Crewe Alexandra on 27 January 1951 in the Third Division North; Darlington lost 5–0. He went on to play for Spennymoor United.
