= Thomas Liddell =

Thomas Liddell may refer to:

- Thomas Liddell (principal) (1800–1880), first principal of Queen's University, Ontario, then Queen's College
- Thomas Liddell, 1st Baron Ravensworth (1775–1855), British peer and Tory politician
- Sir Thomas Liddell, 1st Baronet (1578–1652), English cavalier politician
