= Moses J. Liddell =

American judge (1845–1891)

Hon. Moses J. Liddell
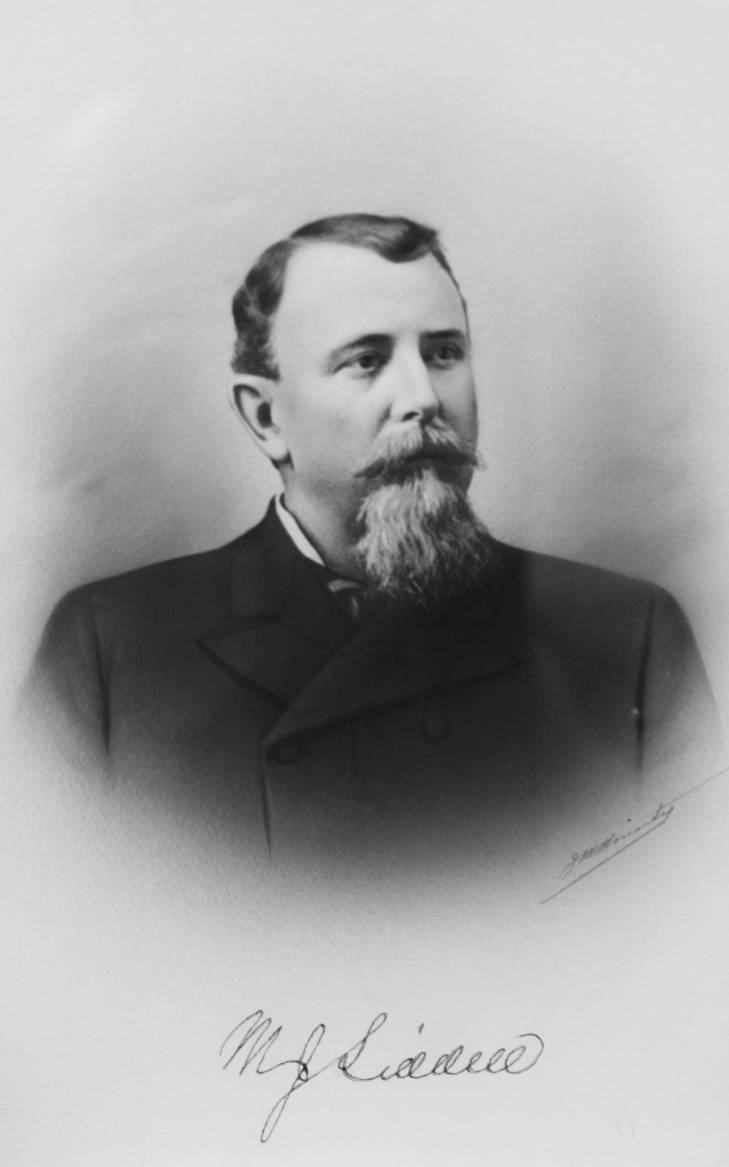

Appointed Judge of the Supreme Court of the Montana Territory.
- In office 1888–1889
- Appointed by: Grover Cleveland
- Preceded by: James H. McLeary

Personal details
- Born: January 15, 1845 Catahoula Parish, Louisiana, U.S.
- Died: October 3, 1891 (aged 46) Bozeman, Montana, U.S.
- Party: Democrat

Moses J. Liddell (1845–1891) was born in Louisiana and appointed Justice of the Territorial Montana Supreme Court, by President Grover Cleveland, serving from 1888 to 1889.

== Early life ==
Moses J. Liddell was born to the wealthy plantation owner and Confederate General, St. John Richardson Liddell and Mary Metcalfe Roper Liddell. He was the third of ten children and the first male. The Liddell family had previously lived on a plantation in Woodville, Mississippi, but had established a plantation named "Llanada" in Catahoula Parish near Harrisonburg, Louisiana, prior to Moses' birth. A famous feud began between the Liddell family and a prominent neighboring landowner named Charles Jones during the 1850s, which would become known as the Jones-Liddell feud.

== Military service ==
Moses J. Liddell enlisted in the Confederate Army when the Civil War began, and was made a Second Lieutenant in the 1st (Wheat's) Special Battalion, Infantry (Louisiana Tigers). He was listed as a prisoner of war, and paroled at Jackson, Mississippi on May 12, 1865.

== Marriage and children ==
Liddell married Isabella Turnbull Semple on March 11, 1868. Together they had three children.

== Jones-Liddell feud ==
His father struggled following the Civil War to retain "Llanada" in Catahoula Parish, due in part to reconstruction policies and the loss of slave labor. As a result of these conditions the Jones-Liddell feud came to a boil when Liddell's father, St. John Richardson Liddell, was assassinated by the Jones family on February 14, 1870. In retaliation for his father's murder, on February 18, 1870, when Moses J. Liddell saw the accused assassin of his father, Col. Charles Jones, Liddell shot him while Jones was being transported to the boat in custody at Harrisonburg. Jones did not die as a result of the gunshot wounds.

== Move to Richland Parish ==
As a result of the political unrest due to the sensationalized feud, Moses J. Liddell along with his wife and children moved to Richland Parish, Louisiana, where the Liddell's had acquired thousands of acres between Girard and Alto, primarily along the banks of Boeuf River.

By 1884, Liddell had opened a law office in Rayville, Louisiana.

In 1876, Liddell was nominated to attend the Democratic State Convention representing Richland Parish and served as chairman of the Democratic Executive Committee of Richland in 1878. Liddell was endorsed by the Democratic club of Ward 3 as their choice for State Representative. On November 5, 1878, Liddell defeated A.B. Cooper by a vote of 621-440 for the State Representative seat.

== Appointed as judge ==
In 1880, Liddell retired from the legislature and moved to Monroe, Louisiana, where he joined Charles J. Boatner in a law practice. Liddell traveled to Washington in 1887 and received a commitment from President Grover Cleveland for an appointment to the State Supreme Court of the Montana Territory. His colleague, Charles Boatner, went on to become an elected member of United States House of Representatives in 1889.

== Death and legacy ==
In 1891, Liddell died at his home in Bozeman, Montana, after a brief illness.

Political offices
Preceded by James H. McLeary	Justice of the Montana Supreme Court; 1888–1889	Succeeded by Court abolished
