= Wanderlei Silva vs. Quinton Jackson =

Mixed martial arts rivalries

Tale of the Tape
- Title(s) on the line: None

Tale of the tape
Boxer	(Brazil) Wanderlei Silva	(United States) Quinton Jackson
Nickname	"The Axe Murderer"	"Rampage"
Hometown	Curitiba, Paraná	Memphis, Tennessee
Height	5 ft 11 in (1.80 m)	6 ft 1 in (1.85 m)
Weight	205 lb (93 kg)	205 lb (93 kg)
Style	Muay Thai; Brazilian jiu-jitsu	Boxing; Wrestling
Recognition	Former PRIDE Middleweight Champion	Former UFC Light Heavyweight Champion

Wanderlei "The Axe Murderer" Silva versus Quinton "Rampage" Jackson is a mixed martial arts series of fights that began in the now-defunct Pride Fighting Championships in Japan. All four fights have been televised live on pay-per-view.

The series features four particularly violent fights in mixed martial arts, with all four contests ending in a knockout or technical knockout. On two occasions, the loser of the fight was rendered unconscious. The second fight in particular has received high acclaim, as it was named the 2004 Fight of the Year by the Wrestling Observer Newsletter awards. The series is also known for the rivalry and bad blood between the two fighters. Indeed, Chris Parry of the Vancouver Sun considers the matches between Wanderlei Silva and Quinton Jackson to be "legendary" for the hatred and violence displayed. MMAWeekly.com considers Silva vs. Jackson to be among the greatest trilogies in the history of mixed martial arts.

The rivalry began in the months leading up to Pride Final Conflict 2003 on November 9, 2003, where the first fight took place. Silva was victorious in the first meeting, after landing close to 20 standing knee strikes to Jackson's face before the contest was halted. Silva once again bested Jackson with a combination of knees in the subsequent rematch at Pride 28: High Octane, leaving the latter motionless and hanging between the ropes. The third fight took place in the Ultimate Fighting Championship (UFC) at UFC 92: The Ultimate 2008 on December 27, 2008. This time, however, it would be Quinton Jackson avenging his two earlier defeats to Silva by knocking him unconscious with a left hook. Ultimately, Jackson would even the score at 2–2 by knocking Silva out for the second time on September 29, 2018, at Bellator 206.

== Background ==
The rivalry between the two fighters reportedly began around the Pride Middleweight (205 lb) Grand Prix. In an attempt to set up a "tune-up" bout for Kazushi Sakuraba, who had just been defeated by Silva, Pride brought in Quinton Jackson, a relative unknown at the time, to face the Japanese fighter. The fight did not go as expected, with the much bigger Jackson overpowering Sakuraba and landing several punches. Sakuraba was eventually victorious via submission, but Jackson established himself as a legitimate contender to Wanderlei Silva's Pride Middleweight Championship in the process.

Following this success, Jackson began to direct several personal insults at Silva, a gesture that infuriated the champion. Silva was in the midst of what would be a 17-fight unbeaten streak. He captured the championship from Sakuraba at Pride 17, and defeated him a total of three times. Jackson continued his negative comments towards the champion, and directed his latest insult at Silva's training camp at the time, the Chute Boxe Academy.

These insults culminated in an altercation between the two on March 16, 2003, at Pride 25. Following a victory over Kevin Randleman, Jackson was given the microphone and started talking directly to Silva, who was sitting at ringside, saying "I want you boy. It's gonna be me and you." Silva immediately jumped to his feet and made his way into the ring. He was now face-to-face with Jackson, who continued by saying, "You have my belt, you're keeping it warm for me." Silva responded by yelling "MY BELT!" and giving Jackson a forceful shove. Jackson, visibly upset, advanced towards Silva as dozens of Pride officials intervened. Jackson stood still as he was surrounded by officials, while Silva had to be constantly restrained from charging at Jackson. Jackson later stated that he was instructed by Pride executives to make these comments. He added that Silva's shove infuriated him, and he was ready to fight Silva immediately.

Since then, Jackson has further clarified the origins and the nature of the bad blood between the two. According to Jackson, the rivalry exists because he was one of the few fighters in Japan who was not afraid of Silva outside of the ring. Jackson stated that fighters were afraid to eat or be in an elevator with Silva, but he was not one of them. He added that the bad blood is only coming from Silva's end. Silva, on the other hand, cited Jackson's apparent insults towards him on the internet to account for the bad blood in an interview prior to the UFC 92 fight.

== Pride Final Conflict 2003 ==
- Date: November 9, 2003
- Title(s) on the line: PrideFC Middleweight Championship

Tale of the tape
Boxer	(United States) Quinton Jackson	(Brazil) Wanderlei Silva
Nickname	Rampage	The Axe Murderer
Hometown	Memphis, Tennessee	Curitiba, Brazil
Pre-fight record	19–3	23–3–1 (1)
Recognition		PrideFC Middleweight Champion

Result
- Wanderlei Silva wins by Technical Knockout at 6:28 of round 1

The first meeting between the two took place in the final round of Pride's Middleweight Grand Prix tournament at Pride Final Conflict 2003 on November 9, 2003. The venue for the fight was the sold-out Tokyo Dome in Tokyo, Japan, with a live audience of 53,000. The two fighters each fought in the same night prior to the finals, with Silva defeating Hidehiko Yoshida, and Jackson defeating Chuck Liddell, respectively. On the line was the Pride 2003 Middleweight Grand Prix Championship.

The fight began with Jackson looking to close the distance early. Jackson immediately went for a double-leg takedown, and picked Silva up. Silva then locked his legs, creating a standing closed guard, and applied a guillotine choke. The two stayed in this position until Jackson loosened his own grip, taking the fight to the ground for the first time, with Silva holding onto the chokehold.

After going to the ground, Jackson managed to slip out of the choke. Jackson began to attack with ground and pound, dealing strikes to Silva's body while Silva answered with the same from the bottom. Jackson began to land punches to Silva's face, and the latter attempted an armbar. Silva could not pull off the hold, and Jackson moved into side control shortly after. From here, Jackson threw punches to Silva's head and followed by landing two knees, again to the head (which were legal under Pride rules).

Jackson spent the next 5 minutes working on body strikes from closed guard. The referee then decided to return the fight to stand up due to inactivity. This decision by the referee is seen as controversial by some commentators, such as Dave Meltzer. Jackson has also voiced his displeasure for the stand-up. Sam Caplan, an MMA journalist, added that the Pride referees were employees of the promotion, and Jackson was victim of several "hasty" stand-ups from the officials. Whether he was referring specifically to the fights against Silva is unknown. Shortly following the stand-up, Silva secured a Muay Thai Clinch and landed approximately 20 knee strikes to Jackson's face and several soccer kicks to the head before the referee called a stop to the contest. Silva was declared the winner by Technical Knockout at 6:28 of the 1st round and the Pride 2003 Middleweight Grand Prix Champion.

== Pride 28: High Octane ==
- Date: October 31, 2004
- Title(s) on the line: PrideFC Middleweight Championship and PrideFC Middleweight Grand Prix

Tale of the tape
Boxer	(United States) Quinton Jackson	(Brazil) Wanderlei Silva
Nickname	Rampage	The Axe Murderer
Hometown	Memphis, Tennessee	Curitiba, Brazil
Pre-fight record	21–4	27–3–1 (1)
Recognition		PrideFC Middleweight Champion

Result
- Wanderlei Silva wins by Knockout at 3:26 of round 2

The rematch took place on October 31, 2004, at Pride 28: High Octane. The venue for the fight was the Saitama Super Arena in Saitama, Japan, with a live audience of 24,028. This time, Silva's Middleweight Championship was on the line. Jackson became the number one contender after knocking out Ricardo Arona with a slam at Pride Critical Countdown 2004.

The second fight began with Jackson moving forward and getting into a clinch early. The two exchanged strikes in this position before breaking up. Jackson followed by throwing a brief flurry of punches and landing a knee. About halfway into the first round, Silva threw a flurry of punches and landed several knees from the Muay Thai clinch before pushing Jackson against the turnbuckle. Jackson scrambled out of the clinch and scored a takedown with a combination of a leg trip and a headlock. Jackson attacked with ground and pound, but to limited damage, while Silva attempted submissions unsuccessfully. The referee then stood the fighters up due to inactivity.

Silva re-opened the action standing with a combination of punches and kicks. Jackson answered with a straight right hand, knocking Silva on to the canvas. Jackson followed Silva down and looked to finish the fight in Silva's closed guard. Jackson moved into side control shortly after and landed a clean knee strike to Silva's head followed by several punches, again to the head to end the round.

The second round began with the two fighters exchanging a flurry of strikes. Silva then attempted a takedown with a combination of a body lock and a trip, but Jackson reversed it into a takedown of his own. The action stayed in Silva's guard very briefly, until the two scrambled back to their feet.

During the subsequent exchange of strikes, Silva landed a direct right hook on Jackson's face, stunning Jackson and sending him backpedaling towards the ropes. Silva closed the distance and secured a Muay Thai clinch. From here, Silva landed approximately 5 knee strikes to Jackson's head, causing him to fall into the ropes, unconscious and with blood pouring out of his face. Silva was declared the winner by Knockout at 3:26 of the 2nd round to remain the Pride Middleweight Champion.

== Aftermath and Ultimate Fighting Championship ==
Following the second fight, Jackson fought a pair of disappointing performances against the Rua brothers, earning a controversial decision over Murilo and getting brutally TKO'd by Mauricio. These fights caused the rivalry to "cool down," because Jackson was no longer promoted as a contender for Silva's Middleweight Championship. Silva's unbeaten streak was ended in his next fight, when he lost a split decision to heavyweight kickboxer, Mark Hunt. The streak lasted from August 2000 to December 2004. The rivalry between Silva and Jackson would be rekindled in the Ultimate Fighting Championship more than 4 years later.

Wanderlei Silva signed with the UFC in August 2007, and had two fights in the organization, a decision loss to Chuck Liddell at UFC 79, and a 36-second knockout victory over Keith Jardine at UFC 84. Quinton Jackson joined the organization in December 2006, became the UFC Light Heavyweight Champion with a technical knockout of Chuck Liddell at UFC 71, and successfully defended the belt at UFC 75 against Dan Henderson. Jackson then lost the championship to Forrest Griffin in a decision at UFC 86.

== UFC 92: The Ultimate 2008 ==
- Date: December 27, 2008

Tale of the tape
Boxer	(United States) Quinton Jackson	(Brazil) Wanderlei Silva
Nickname	Rampage	The Axe Murderer
Hometown	Memphis, Tennessee	Curitiba, Brazil
Pre-fight record	28–7	32–8–1 (1)

Result
- Quinton Jackson wins by Knockout at 3:21 of round 1

It was announced that the third fight between Wanderlei Silva and Quinton Jackson would take place at UFC 92. The winner between the two would likely be the next challenger for the UFC's Light Heavyweight Championship. "Showdown" Joe Ferraro expected the third fight between Silva and Jackson to "steal the show" at UFC 92, and would "no doubt be one for the ages." Jason Probst of Sherdog expected the fight to be a "solid fight at worst" and an "epic struggle at best." Adam Morgan of FiveOuncesofPain.com predicted another "classic battle" between the two. Kevin Iole of Yahoo! Sports added that it would not be a surprise if the contest turned out to be the fight of the year.

The fight was announced after a series of personal incidents involving the former UFC Light Heavyweight Champion. Among them were Jackson's split with former trainer and mentor, Juanito Ibarra, relocation to the UK-based training camp, Wolfslair, hit and run arrest, and possible jail time. There were questions surrounding Jackson's mental health, following an apparent episode of delirium on the day of his arrest on July 15, 2008. UFC President Dana White attributed the condition to a combination of Jackson not eating and sleeping for four days, while drinking only water and energy drinks. White added that drugs or alcohol were not factors in the incident. Jackson's personal problems and mental state became central issues for those who analyzed the fight, including for Randy "The Natural" Couture, a fighter noted for his exceptional ability in fight analysis. After consideration of these events, speculation arose as to whether putting Jackson back into action against Silva would be too soon.

Wanderlei Silva reiterated his dislike for Jackson in pre-fight interviews, and asserted that his sentiments toward Jackson have not changed since their previous fight. In an interview with UFC.com, Silva stated that he was not fighting Jackson for money, but for "pure pleasure." He again cited Jackson's apparent insults toward him on the internet to account for the animosity. Jackson on the other hand, insisted that the third fight with Silva was not about avenging his two prior defeats, but was "merely his job." He also added that the third encounter with Silva was inevitable, especially after Silva signed with the UFC.

Silva and Jackson had another brief altercation, this time at the UFC 92 weigh-ins. After both tipping the scales, they participated in an intense staredown for photography. In the course of the staredown, Wanderlei Silva shoved Quinton Jackson before the UFC officials and security quickly intervened. Jackson could be seen smiling and saying something to Silva immediately preceding the scuffle. Jackson followed with his trademark howl and a "throat-slashing" gesture, as Silva was escorted away. The fight between took place on December 27, 2008, at UFC 92. The venue for the fight was the MGM Grand Garden Arena in Las Vegas, Nevada, with a live audience of 14,166.

The fight began with Jackson taking the center of the cage as Silva circled outside. Jackson opened the action with an overhand right, and immediately moved backwards. Both fighters appeared cautious for the opening minutes of the fight, exchanging strikes and quickly moving away. Silva focused on leg kicks, while Jackson focused on working the jab.

At 3:21 of the 1st round, after Wanderlei flurried and missed a punch with his right hand, Jackson countered with a left hook on Silva's jaw, sending the latter on to the canvas and rendering him unconscious. Jackson followed with three punches to Silva's head on the ground, two of which occurred after referee Yves Lavigne attempted to halt the contest. Wanderlei remained on the canvas for several moments, but appeared to be OK as he left the cage under his own power.

Following the fight at UFC 92, Jackson drew criticism from Todd Martin of CBS Sports for ignoring referee Yves Lavigne's attempt to stop the contest. Martin compared Jackson's actions to Renato Sobral's continued choke of David Heath following a tap out, which led to Sobral's dismissal from the UFC. Martin called for punishment against Jackson, but no action was taken against Jackson for this allegedly unsportsmanlike behavior.

== Bellator MMA ==
On February 16, 2016, Jackson had settled the contractual disputes with Bellator MMA and signed with the company for a 2nd time.

Jackson fought Satoshi Ishii on June 24, 2016, at Bellator 157 and won via split decision. Subsequently, Jackson faced Muhammed Lawal in a rematch at Bellator 175 on March 31, 2017, losing the fight via unanimous decision. His losing streak continued at Bellator 192 on January 20, 2018, by losing a decision against Chael Sonnen in the quarterfinals of the Bellator Heavyweight Tournament.

Meanwhile, in early March 2016, Bellator MMA announced that Silva had signed a multi-fight contract with the organization after retiring in 2014. The previous lifetime ban handed down by the Nevada State Athletic Commission was reduced to a three-year suspension retroactive to 24 May 2014. He was eligible for reinstatement beginning 25 May 2017. The ban would not prevent Silva from competing at Indian Casinos or in Japan because NSAC's suspensions apply only if the governing body of the fight decides to abide by them.

After four years away from the sport, Silva made his delayed Bellator debut against Chael Sonnen in the main event at Bellator NYC on 24 June 2017, losing by unanimous decision.

== Bellator 206 ==
- Date: September 29, 2018

Tale of the tape
Boxer	(United States) Quinton Jackson	(Brazil) Wanderlei Silva
Nickname	Rampage	The Axe Murderer
Hometown	Memphis, Tennessee	Curitiba, Brazil
Pre-fight record	37–13	35–13–1 (1)

Result
- Quinton Jackson wins by Technical Knockout at 4:26 of round 2

After coming off both disappointing performances against Chael Sonnen, Rampage and Wanderlei were set to face each other on September 29, 2018, at Bellator 206 in San Jose, California in a Heavyweight bout.

In the first round Silva used his jab and both fighters had their moments while landing shots. Jackson hit a body kick that seemed to be one of the significant strikes of the round.

In the second, Jackson came out strong with a right hand that hurt Silva while the latter was grabbing hold of Jackson. Silva was seemingly exhausted but was still able to engage in a serious striking exchange. The flurry of strikes continued until Jackson connected with another right hand that dropped Silva. Jackson held Silva against the cage and continued to land punches until referee Mike Beltran stopped the fight at 4:32, declaring Rampage the winner by TKO and putting an end to the rivalry.

== Aftermath ==
The rivalry between Silva and Jackson has been regarded as "exceptionally violent," and the fights in the Pride Fighting Championship have been considered to be two of the most brutal matches to ever take place in the organization. Chris Parry of the Vancouver Sun asserted that the two fights in Pride will be remembered as "some of the best fights in this era," and as "some of the most devastating boxing and kickboxing exchanges seen in years." The rematch at Pride 28 has been noted as an exciting fight with back-and-forth action, and was also named the 2004 Fight of the Year by the Wrestling Observer Newsletter awards. The first fight at Pride Final Conflict 2003 has also gained fight of the year consideration.

=== After the third bout ===
Jackson's next fight was not against the new UFC Light Heavyweight Champion, Rashad Evans, as the pre-fight reports suggested. UFC President Dana White indicated that the original plan was for Jackson to receive an immediate title shot, but Evans requested time off to recover from injuries he sustained from his fight against Forrest Griffin. Instead, Jackson faced Keith Jardine at UFC 96, and was victorious by unanimous decision. He was then scheduled to face Rashad Evans at UFC 98, but it was later revealed on March 11, 2009, that Jackson needed surgery to repair torn ligaments in his jaw, effectively cancelling the bout against Evans.

In a post fight interview following UFC 92, Wanderlei Silva stated that he would be making his return to action in the Summer of 2009, preferably at UFC 100. He added that would like to fight Jackson for a fourth and even fifth time if possible. Silva's next fight was a catchweight contest against Rich Franklin at UFC 99, in Cologne, Germany on June 13, 2009. Silva lost by unanimous decision in a competitive fight.

While Silva had an impending fight with Franklin, he was still asked about his future with Jackson. Indeed, in an interview with Fighters Only Magazine, Silva reiterated his desire to fight Jackson for a fourth time, and added that he wants it to be the final fight of his career. He also said that he no longer has problems with Jackson outside of the cage. Silva ended by saying that he spoke with Jackson at UFC 95 in London, England, and the two shook hands.

=== After the fourth bout ===
In 2024, Rampage expressed his interest in facing Silva in a boxing match, which was quickly accepted by the latter.
