= Robert Scotland Liddell =

British reporter and photographer

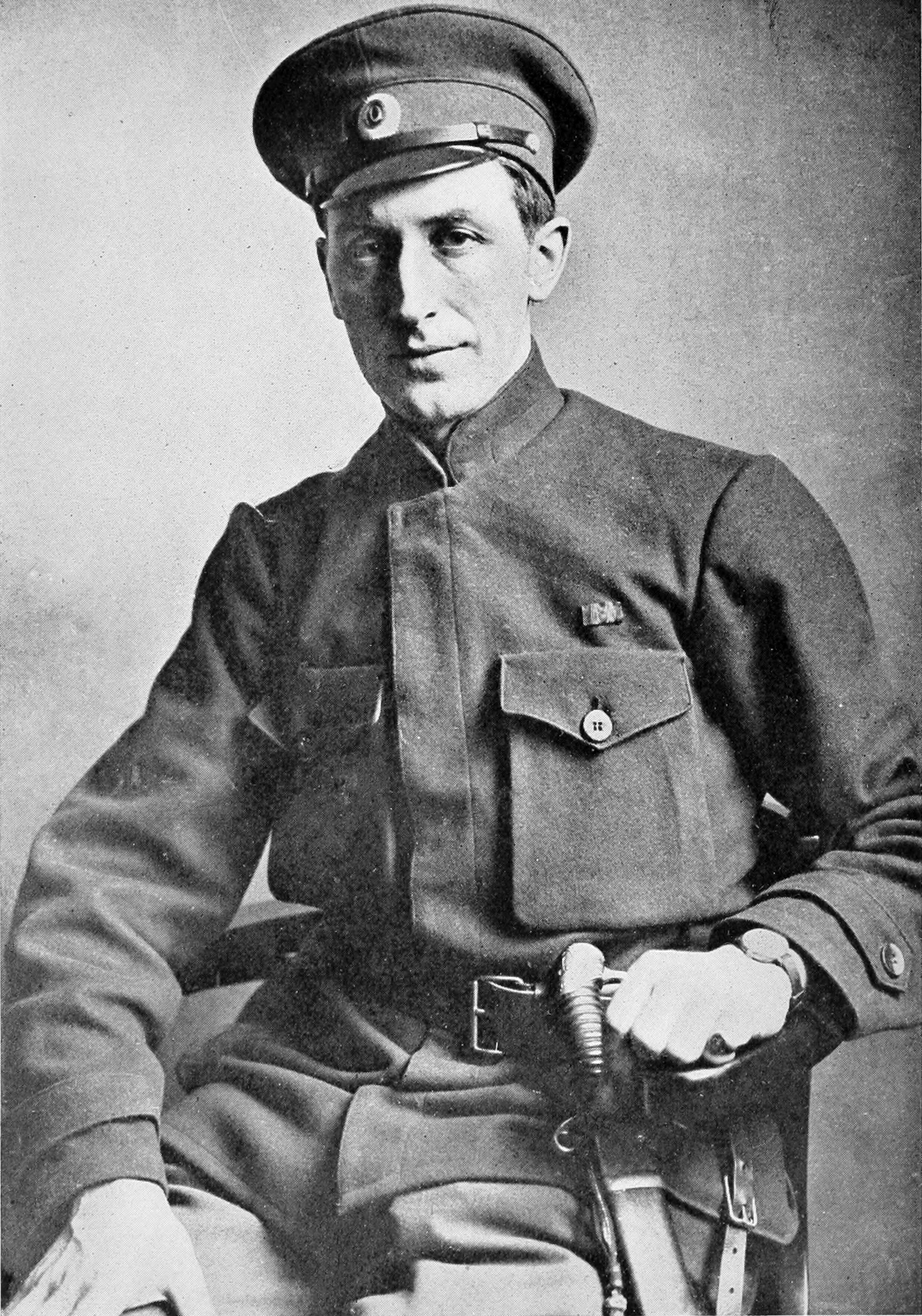
Robert Scotland Liddell, 1916

Robert Scotland Liddell (1885–1972) was a British reporter and photographer for The Sphere newspaper, who covered the events on the Russian front during the World War I.

Scotland Liddell arrived in Petrograd in the spring of 1915 and soon moved to Warsaw, where he served as a member of the Group of Polish Red Cross Volunteers with the Russian army. He also contributed articles to The Sphere as its special correspondent. Mr Liddell was also representing British media in Mesopotamia and Baku towards the end of World War One. He has written many articles about the political situation in the South Caucasus region between 1918 and 1920. He also interviewed several members of the Azerbaijani Democratic Republic (1918/20). One of his interesting interviews was conducted with the foreign minister of the Azerbaijani Democratic Republic, M.Y.Jafarov in 1919. The name of the article was First Muslim Republic: British interests.

== Books ==
- The Track of the War: With Special Notes by Albert De Keersmaecker. Simpkin, Marshall, Hamilton, Kent & Co., 1915
- On the Russian front. Simpkin, Marshall, Hamilton, Kent & co., limited, 1916
- "Sestra": Sketches from the Russian Front. Hodder and Stoughton, 1917
- Actions and Reactions in Russia. Chapman & Hall, 1917, BiblioBazaar, LLC, 2008, ISBN 0-559-27132-8, ISBN 978-0-559-27132-8
- Big brother Bob. Simpkin, Marshall, 1923
- Fifty Thousand Miles of Sun. Cassell and co., ltd., 1925
- The gilded sign. 1927
- The key of content. Cassell, 1928
- Moulded in sand. McCutchan, 1930
