= Forrest Griffin vs. Stephan Bonnar =

Mixed martial arts rivalries

Forrest Griffin vs. Stephan Bonnar is a duo of fights starting in the finals of The Ultimate Fighter 1 contest which received national acclaim, and was highly regarded among fans as one of the most exciting, greatest and memorable fights in the history of not only the Ultimate Fighting Championship (UFC) but of mixed martial arts (MMA) in general. The bout was voted fight of the year by a poll of over 19,000 readers of the website MMAWeekly.com, and was recognized as the 2005 Shoot Match of the Year by the Wrestling Observer Newsletter. The fight was credited by Dana White as the "most important fight in UFC history". The fight was also voted the greatest fight in UFC history in 2009.

== Background ==
The first season of The Ultimate Fighter reality television show featured sixteen mixed martial artists divided into two weight classes: middleweight and light heavyweight. Coaches Randy Couture and Chuck Liddell were selected to mentor the contestants. The contestants were distributed evenly between two teams, and a series of exhibition matches were held until only two fighters from each weight class remained. The finalists appeared on national television in the show finale and competed for a contract with the UFC.

Forrest Griffin, coached by Chuck Liddell, and Stephan Bonnar, coached by Randy Couture, met in the light heavyweight final.

Both fighters defeated two opponents to make it to the final. On episode seven, Stephan Bonnar defeated Bobby Southworth from Team Liddell in a split decision. On episode nine, Forrest Griffin defeated his first opponent, Alex Schoenauer, by TKO. In the semi-finals, the contestants fought the remaining teammate in their respective weight class to determine the finalists. Forrest Griffin defeated Sam Hoger by TKO; Stephan Bonnar defeated teammate Mike Swick by triangle choke / armbar submission.

== The Ultimate Fighter Finale ==
- Date: April 9, 2005
- Title(s) on the line: TUF 1 Light Heavyweight Division Champion

Tale of the tape
| Boxer | (United States) Forrest Griffin | (United States) Stephan Bonnar |
| Nickname | | American Psycho |
| Hometown | Augusta, Georgia | Munster, Indiana |
| Pre-fight record | 9–2 | 9–1 |

Result
- Forrest Griffin wins by unanimous decision; both fighters receive six–figure UFC contracts

The finale was held at the Cox Pavilion in Las Vegas, Nevada on April 9, 2005 and was broadcast nationally on Spike TV. It was refereed by Herb Dean and was slated for three 5-minute rounds, the standard UFC format for non-title fights.

Neither fighter offered to "touch gloves" (a gesture of sportsmanship) as the fight began. Both fighters exchanged punches and the occasional low kicks, with Griffin gaining a slight advantage (according to color commentator Joe Rogan). The first round ended with no clear winner. Rogan called the first round the "Hagler-Hearns" of mixed martial arts history (alluding to a famous boxing bout between Marvin Hagler and Thomas Hearns, known as The War).

Early in the second round, a jab by Bonnar created a cut on Griffin's nose, prompting the referee to stop the fight so a doctor could check the cut and clear Griffin to continue. He was cleared, and the fight continued as Bonnar controlled Griffin with a Muay Thai clinch and delivered several knees to Griffin's face. The round ended with Griffin failing a takedown attempt, and Bonnar defending Griffin's offensive Thai clinch.

In the third and final round, Griffin started with low kicks and punches; Bonnar attempted to counterattack from a distance. Griffin delivered several knees from the Thai clinch. Mid-round, Bonnar landed several short punches while infighting. However, Bonnar counterattacked only when opportunities were present. The round ended with Griffin holding Bonnar in a Thai clinch and attacking with knees, followed by a short exchange of punches.

All three judges scored the fight 29–28 in favor of the winner, Forrest Griffin, but because of Stephan Bonnar's outstanding performance, Dana White also granted Stephan a UFC contract on the spot.

The UFC awarded Griffin a contract, as well as a Scion car, a dirt bike, and an Audemars Piguet watch.

== Rematch at UFC 62 ==
- Date: August 26, 2006

Tale of the tape
| Boxer | (United States) Forrest Griffin | (United States) Stephan Bonnar |
| Nickname | | American Psycho |
| Hometown | Augusta, Georgia | Munster, Indiana |
| Pre-fight record | 12–3 | 10–3 |

Result
- Forrest Griffin wins by unanimous decision

Griffin and Bonnar met again as the co-main event of UFC 62, with Griffin winning another unanimous decision. Following the bout, Bonnar tested positive by the Nevada State Athletic Commission for boldenone, a banned anabolic steroid, and received a nine-month suspension and a $5,000 fine.
