= Anderson Silva =

Brazilian mixed martial artist (born 1975)

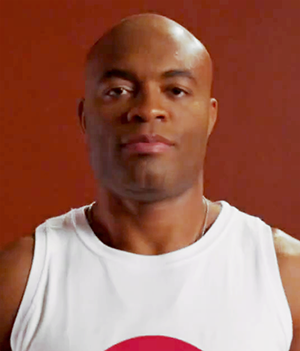
- Silva in 2012
- Born: Anderson da Silva; 14 April 1975 (age 51); São Paulo, Brazil
- Other names: The Spider
- Nationality: Brazilian; American
- Height: 6 ft 2 in (1.88 m)
- Weight: 185 lb (84 kg; 13.2 st)
- Division: Welterweight; Middleweight; Light Heavyweight
- Reach: 77 1/2 in (197 cm)
- Fighting out of: Curitiba, Brazil
- Team: Chute Boxe Academy (1997–2003); Muay Thai Dream Team (2003–2006); Brazilian Top Team (2003–2006); Black House (2007–2013); Team Nogueira; Killer Bees Muay Thai College (Founded/Current Team)
- Trainer: Boxing: Josuel Distak and Luiz Dorea; Jiu-Jitsu: Antônio Rodrigo Nogueira, Sylvio Behring and Ramon Lemos; Wrestling: Mark Muñoz; Muay Thai: Rafael Cordeiro, Pedro Rizzo, Israel Gomes; Panantukan: Dan Inosanto
- Rank: Black prajied in Muay Thai; 3rd degree black belt in Brazilian Jiu-Jitsu under Antônio Rodrigo "Minotauro" Nogueira; 5th dan black belt in Taekwondo; Black belt in Judo; Yellow rope in Capoeira
- Years active: 1997–2020 (MMA); 1998, 2005, 2021–present (Boxing)

Professional boxing record
- Total: 6
- Wins: 4
- By knockout: 3
- Losses: 2
- By knockout: 1

Kickboxing record
- Total: 1
- Wins: 1
- By knockout: 1

Mixed martial arts record
- Total: 46
- Wins: 34
- By knockout: 23
- By submission: 3
- By decision: 8
- Losses: 11
- By knockout: 4
- By submission: 2
- By decision: 4
- By disqualification: 1
- No contests: 1

Other information
- Spouse: Dayane
- Children: 5
- Website: www.spideranderson.com
- Boxing record from BoxRec
- Mixed martial arts record from Sherdog

Anderson da Silva (Portuguese pronunciation: [ˈɐ̃deʁsõ ˈsiwvɐ]; born 14 April 1975) is a Brazilian mixed martial artist and professional boxer. He is a former UFC Middleweight Champion who unified the UFC Middleweight and Pride World Welterweight Championship, and holds the record for the longest title reign in UFC history at 2,457 days. This started in 2006 and ended in 2013 and included a previously held UFC record of 16 consecutive victories in that span. Silva left the UFC in November 2020 and returned to boxing. He is widely regarded as one of the greatest mixed martial artists of all time. Silva was inducted into the UFC Hall of Fame in July 2023.

== Background ==
Silva was born on 14 April 1975, in São Paulo, Brazil. The son of a poverty-stricken family, he spent the majority of his childhood in Curitiba with his aunt and uncle, who was an officer with the Curitiba police force. Silva's first foray in martial arts began as a child training jiu-jitsu with neighborhood kids. As a teen, Silva began training in taekwondo, capoeira and muay thai.

== Mixed martial arts career ==
=== Early career (1997–2002) ===
Silva initially fought in Brazil in the welterweight category. Silva made his professional debut in 1997 with a pair of wins. Silva recorded his first loss in 2000 to Luiz Azeredo by decision. After that fight, he went on a nine-fight winning streak, winning six of those fights by either submission or TKO. After winning his first match in Japan, he was put up against Shooto champion Hayato Sakurai on 26 August 2001. Silva beat Sakurai by unanimous decision after three rounds and became the new Shooto Middleweight Champion (at 168 lb, equivalent to welterweight in most other organizations including the UFC) and the first man to defeat Sakurai, who was undefeated in his first 20 fights.

=== Pride Fighting Championships and Cage Rage (2002–2006) ===
In 2002, Silva was scheduled to fight then-current UFC Welterweight Champion, and future UFC Hall of Famer Matt Hughes at UFC 36. However, Silva instead signed a contract and began fighting for PRIDE Fighting Championships. In his first fight with the promotion, he stopped Alex Stiebling with a cut resulting from a high kick. In his next match, he won via decision against the "Diet Butcher" Alexander Otsuka. At Pride 25, Silva faced former UFC welterweight champion Carlos Newton. Newton tried to shoot in on Silva, but was hit with a flying knee. Newton collapsed and Silva finished the fight with strikes, winning by technical knockout.

At Pride 26, Silva faced Daiju Takase. Takase, with a record of four wins and seven losses, was the underdog. However Silva was dominated on the ground for almost the entire fight before being submitted by Takase when caught in a triangle choke late in the first round. After his loss to Takase, Silva became demotivated and thought about quitting MMA, but was convinced to keep on fighting by Antônio Rodrigo Nogueira. Silva then left Chute Boxe, joined Nogueira in Brazilian Top Team and started to fight in other promotions around the world. On 27 June 2004, Silva fought Jeremy Horn and earned a decision victory.

Three months later, Silva made his debut in the Cage Rage promotion in England. At Cage Rage 8 Silva fought and defeated noted striker Lee Murray by decision. That year, Silva returned to Pride FC on 31 December to face Ryo Chonan. Silva was in control with a take down and body triangle in the first round. Chonan was able to counter Silva's knees from the clinch, with knees, and takedowns. Chonan was perceived by some to be winning up until the finish. During the third round, Bas Rutten, commentating alongside Mauro Ranallo, stated that he believed Anderson must obtain a knockout or strong finish or he would lose the fight. Despite being the underdog, Chonan ended the fight in the third round with a rare flying scissor heel hook, forcing Silva to submit. After the loss to Chonan he was cut by Pride, Silva continued fighting in the Cage Rage promotion, as well as other promotions around the world. Silva defended his Cage Rage title against Curtis Stout.

Although he was slated to fight Matt Lindland at Cage Rage 16, Lindland's decision to fight Mike Van Arsdale at Raze Fight Night put an end to the highly anticipated match up. Instead, Silva defended his championship against Tony Fryklund, winning the fight with a reverse elbow, knocking out Fryklund early in the first round.

Silva competed in Hawaii's Rumble on the Rock promotion, where he fought Yushin Okami in the first round of the 175 lb tournament. Though labeled as a favorite to win the tournament, Silva was eliminated from the tournament when he kicked Okami in the face from the guard position. Okami's knees were on the ground at the time, making the attack an illegal strike to the head of a downed opponent. Silva later said that the rule had not been properly explained to him before the bout. "When I fought Okami the rules really weren't explained to me properly in the event I was fighting in," said Silva. "You could kick a downed opponent to the groin or to the head when your back's on the ground. So the rules weren't explained to me properly." While Okami was given the opportunity to recover and continue fighting, Okami opted for the disqualification win. Silva responded by saying he "felt it was a cheap, cowardly way of winning," and that "people that were there saw that he was in the condition to come back and keep fighting, and he didn't."

=== Ultimate Fighting Championship (2006–2020) ===
==== Debut and middleweight championship ====
Although speculation ran rampant about where Silva would sign next, the UFC announced in late April 2006 that they had signed him to a multi-fight contract. It was not long before the UFC started promoting Silva, releasing an interview segment almost immediately after announcing his arrival.

Silva made his debut at Ultimate Fight Night 5 on 28 June 2006. His opponent was The Ultimate Fighter 1 contestant Chris Leben who had gone undefeated in the UFC with five consecutive victories. Leben, confident of victory, had predicted he would KO Silva in a pre-fight interview. A relatively unknown fighter in the United States, Silva made an emphatic debut when he knocked out Leben with a flurry of pinpoint strikes, followed by a final knee strike at 49 seconds into the first round. Silva's striking accuracy was 85%. This fight earned him his first Knockout of the Night award.

In response to the victory, the UFC tallied a poll on their main page, asking viewers to select Silva's next opponent. The majority of voters selected the UFC Middleweight Champion Rich Franklin. Silva fought Franklin at UFC 64 on 14 October 2006, and defeated him by TKO (strikes) at 2:59 in the first round. Silva hit Franklin with knees to the body from the Muay Thai-clinch, then badly broke Franklin's nose with a knee to the face. Unable to strike back, Franklin dodged the last of Silva's strikes before falling to the ground, where referee "Big" John McCarthy ended the fight. Silva was crowned the new UFC Middleweight Champion, becoming the second man to defeat Franklin, after Black House-teammate Lyoto Machida. This fight earned him a Knockout of the Night award. This was also awarded the 2006 Knockout of the Year.

==== Record-setting championship reign ====
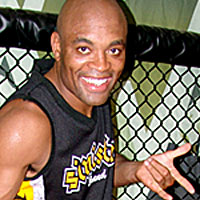
Silva in 2007

On 3 February 2007, at UFC 67, Silva was scheduled to fight The Ultimate Fighter 4 winner Travis Lutter in what would be his first title defense since defeating Rich Franklin in October 2006. However, Lutter failed to make the 185 pounds (84 kg) weight limit and the match was changed to a non-title bout. Many felt that Lutter's best chance to win was to take the fight to the ground, with Lutter being an accomplished jiu-jitsu blackbelt. Silva won via submission with a combination of a triangle choke and elbow strikes in the second round.

In his next fight at UFC 73 on 7 July 2007, Silva successfully defended his title against Nate Marquardt, winning by TKO at 4:50 in the first round. This fight earned him another Knockout of the Night award.

Three months later, on 20 October 2007, at UFC 77, Silva fought a title defense rematch against Rich Franklin, in Franklin's hometown of Cincinnati, Ohio, at the U.S. Bank Arena. Silva defended his belt by defeating Franklin via TKO in the 2nd round. This fight earned him a $40,000 Knockout of the Night award.

On 1 March 2008, at UFC 82 Silva fought Pride Middleweight champion Dan Henderson, in a title unification bout (UFC and Pride titles on the line). Henderson was believed to have the edge on the ground, having competed in the 1992 and 1996 Summer Olympics in Greco-Roman wrestling. Silva defended his title by defeating Henderson via rear naked choke in the 2nd round. This fight earned Silva a $60,000 Fight of the Night award and a separate $60,000 Submission of the Night award.

At UFC Fight Night 14 on 19 July 2008, Silva made his debut at Light Heavyweight (205 lb (93 kg)) in a bout against James Irvin. Silva won via KO due to strikes in 1:01 of the first round after catching Irvin's attempted leg kick with his left arm and delivering a straight right that dropped Irvin to the mat, Silva then finished a prone Irvin with a blitz of punches to the head. Irvin later tested positive for methadone and oxymorphone.

Silva's next fight was on 25 October 2008, at UFC 90 in Rosemont, Illinois, Silva defended his Middleweight title against Patrick Côté. In the third round, Côté landed awkwardly on his right leg while throwing a kick and fell to the mat grasping his right knee in pain. Referee Herb Dean declared the fight over when Côté could not continue, ruling the bout a TKO victory for Silva. Côté, however, became the first of Silva's UFC opponents to make it past the 2nd round. After his fight with Côté, Silva was criticized for seemingly avoiding contact during the bout. Dana White criticized Silva, saying: "I didn't understand Silva's tactics... It wasn't the Anderson Silva I've been watching the last two years." Silva said in the post-fight news conference:

"There are many people saying I was disrespecting Côté, but this is absolutely not true. My game plan since the beginning was fight five rounds, inducing him to commit mistakes and capitalize on that during the first three rounds and look for the knockout during the fourth and fifth rounds. It was working, and the biggest proof of that is that I almost didn't waste any blows. I connected with a couple of good punches and knees, but unfortunately he got hurt and the fight was over. This is not my fault."

On 18 April 2009, at UFC 97 in Montreal, Quebec, Canada, Silva defeated Brazilian Jiu-Jitsu blackbelt Thales Leites by unanimous decision, and recorded his UFC record 9th consecutive win in the octagon. Leites is credited with being the first man in UFC history to take Silva through 5 rounds to a judges' decision. The crowd repeatedly booed his lackluster performance, bored expression, and frustrated attempts to goad his opponent into fighting, and in the 4th and 5th rounds took to dancing, lowering his guard and slapping his opponent without retaliation. Following the fight, Dana White has stated that he was "embarrassed" by Silva's performance, but still said that he believes him to be "the best pound-for-pound fighter in the world".

At UFC 101 which took place on 8 August 2009, in Philadelphia, Pennsylvania, Silva again fought at 205 pounds against former UFC Light Heavyweight Champion Forrest Griffin. Griffin was knocked down three times in the first round. The bout earned Silva Beatdown of the Year honors from Sherdog. The bout shared those honors with the second bout between Brock Lesnar and Frank Mir. Both fighters were awarded $60,000 as Fight of the Night bonuses and Silva received an extra $60,000 in bonus money for Knockout of the Night. This was also awarded the 2009 Knockout of the Year.

After defeating Griffin, a Yahoo! Sports reporter allegedly claimed that Silva's manager, Ed Soares, had confirmed that Silva would abandon his Middleweight belt to fight at Light Heavyweight. However, Soares and a UFC spokesperson confirmed that a conversation agreeing Silva would permanently move up to Light Heavyweight never took place. Silva did not relinquish his title to fight exclusively at Light Heavyweight. Soares stated his attorney plans to speak to Yahoo! Sports about the matter.

Silva was expected to defend the UFC Middleweight Championship against Vitor Belfort on 2 January 2010, at UFC 108. However, Ed Soares announced that the bout would not take place as Silva would not be fully recovered from surgery. Silva was then set to face Belfort on 6 February 2010, at UFC 109. The fight, however, was dependent on Silva's healing, which he described as "not going as planned." The fight was canceled because of Silva's slow recovery. Silva was once again scheduled to face Belfort on 10 April 2010, at UFC 112. The fight was later canceled again due to an injury to Belfort. Demian Maia was selected to fill the spot and take on Silva for the belt.

In the first two rounds fighting Maia, Silva appeared to mock his opponent while employing quick, precise striking. In the third round, however, Silva's tempo seemed to change. He looked to Maia to be the aggressor while he largely circled and taunted his opponent. In the fifth round, Silva's lack of action prompted referee Dan Miragliotta to warn Silva for his conduct. The crowd began to side with Maia, who was the only fighter attempting to engage. After 5 rounds, Silva was declared the winner via unanimous decision.

Silva was widely criticized for his performance. Dana White said it was the most embarrassed he had ever been since becoming UFC president. Midway through the fourth round, White walked away from the fight and gave the championship belt to Silva's manager, Ed Soares. White was so annoyed that he declined to personally place the belt around Silva's waist, claiming it was the first time he had done so after a title match. It was also claimed that Silva verbally taunted Maia, saying, "Come on, hit me in the face, playboy." In the immediate post-fight interview, Silva apologized and said that he wasn't himself and that he would need to go back and reevaluate the humility that got him to where he is. In the post-fight interview, Silva made multiple references about how Demian insulted him before the bout. However, the pre-fight banter was seen by many as not out of the ordinary.

On 7 August 2010, Silva faced Chael Sonnen for the UFC Middleweight title at UFC 117. In the first round, Sonnen stunned Silva with a punch before taking him down and dominating from the top position, landing multiple blows. The following three rounds played out in a similar fashion, going to the ground early with Sonnen dominating from inside Silva's guard. In the fifth round, Silva slipped after being tagged by Sonnen's left hook and the challenger took advantage by once again establishing a top position and delivering strikes to Silva. With about two minutes left in the round, Silva was able to lock up a triangle armbar on Sonnen, forcing Sonnen to submit at 3:10 of Round 5. This fight earned him another $60,000 Fight of the Night award and an additional $60,000 Submission of the Night award. This was also awarded the 2010 Submission of the Year.

In the fight, Sonnen had struck Silva more times than Silva had been hit thus far in his entire UFC career. According to CompuStrike, in his first 11 UFC fights, Silva had been hit 208 times. On 7 August Sonnen had landed a total of 289 strikes. After the bout it was revealed that Sonnen would have won a judges' decision. All three judges had Sonnen marked as the winner of all four rounds, judges Nelson Hamilton and Dan Stell had Sonnen taking Round 1 10–8, as well as Hamilton awarding the challenger another 10–8 total in Round 3. Silva later claimed to have gone into the fight with a cracked rib and that a doctor advised him not to fight. Dana White announced that Sonnen would get a rematch upon Silva's return.

Following the fight the California State Athletic Commission confirmed that Chael Sonnen tested positive for synthetic testosterone, with his test having revealed a high testosterone to epitestosterone ratio, indicative of testosterone replacement therapy. The promised rematch was revoked after the issue with his testosterone ratio came to light, however, after Sonnen came back and won two straight fights, Dana White scheduled the rematch.

Silva faced Vitor Belfort on 5 February 2011, at UFC 126. Belfort was expected to face Yushin Okami on 13 November 2010, at UFC 122, but was replaced by Nate Marquardt. After a "feeling out" period of about two and a half minutes in the first round, Silva and Belfort started to trade strikes. Silva landed a front kick to Belfort's jaw and followed up with punches to the grounded challenger. Referee Mario Yamasaki stopped the fight at 3:25 into the first round. With the win Silva handed Belfort his first KO loss in 28 career fights and extended his record streak of title defenses to eight. This fight earned him another Knockout of the Night award.

Silva then faced Yushin Okami on 27 August 2011, at UFC 134. He defeated the Japanese middleweight by TKO at 2:04 of round 2, displaying skilled head movement and accurate striking. His record then went to 31–4, avenging his DQ loss to Okami back in 2006.

A rematch with Chael Sonnen was to take place on 23 June 2012, at UFC 147, but the bout was moved back to 7 July 2012, at UFC 148, while the expected co-feature of the Brazilian event, a rematch between Vitor Belfort and Wanderlei Silva would headline the event. The change was due to a scheduling conflict with the UN Conference Rio+20, which occurred during the same time frame as UFC 147. At UFC 148, after again being dominated throughout the first round, Silva stopped Sonnen in the second with a TKO. This fight earned him another Knockout of the Night award.

He became the first to stop Stephan Bonnar via strikes in the 1st round of a light heavyweight bout on 13 October 2012, at UFC 153.

==== Title loss and injury ====
Despite having decided to retire after the Bonnar fight, Silva faced Chris Weidman on 6 July 2013, at UFC 162. Although he was the heavy favorite, he lost by KO in the second round after show boating, ending his streak of the longest title reign in UFC history.

A rematch was held at UFC 168 on 28 December. Weidman dominated the first round; it was reported that Silva may have also cracked his shin bone against Weidman during the first leg check. In the second round Weidman checked one of Silva's leg kicks again, breaking Silva's left fibula and tibia and ending the fight via TKO. Immediately after the fight, Silva had orthopedic surgery to stabilize his tibia with an intramedullary rod; his fibula was reset and was not expected to require further surgery. A UFC statement called the surgery "successful" and said those with similar injuries generally take three to six months to recover.

==== Post-championship reign ====
Despite calls for Silva to retire from MMA, it was confirmed on 29 July 2014, that Silva would return to the organization. Before UFC 179, Silva and the UFC agreed on a new, 15-fight contract that replaced their previous deal which had eight fights remaining.

On 29 October 2014, it was announced that Silva would coach opposite Maurício Rua for The Ultimate Fighter: Brazil 4, which began filming in early 2015. Despite being coaches on the show, the two fighters will not face each other at the end of the season. Silva's continued participation was briefly in doubt during the filming after the announcement of his failed drug test. Initially, Dana White announced that Silva would remain on the show as a coach. Subsequently, Silva was pulled as one of the coaches and was replaced by Antônio Rodrigo Nogueira.

In his first fight post-injury, Silva faced Nick Diaz in the main event of UFC 183 on 31 January 2015. He won the fight via unanimous decision. In the days after the fight, it was revealed that Silva tested positive for Drostanolone and Androstane, two anabolic steroids, in pre-fight drug screening on 9 January 2015. Nevada State Athletic Commission chairman Francisco Aguilar confirmed that the fight has not yet been overturned and can't be until a motion is passed by a majority of the commission. Any penalties, suspensions or changes to the outcome of the fight have to be presented as a motion and then voted on by the commission to enact the order. On 11 February 2015, it was reported that Silva tested positive for an additional unknown illegal substance in a separate test that was related to UFC 183. On 17 February 2015, NSAC executive director Bob Bennett confirmed to ESPN.com that Silva failed his postfight urine test and that Silva had tested positive for the steroid Drostanolone—the same banned substance he tested positive for during an out-of-competition test taken on 9 January 2015. Silva also tested positive for the anti-anxiety medication Oxazepam and Temazepam, which is used to treat sleep deprivation.

On 13 August, after several reschedules, the disciplinary hearing was held to decide on the subject. Silva's defense argued that a tainted sexual enhancement drug that a friend had given to Silva after a trip to Thailand was the root of the two failed tests for drostanolone and also appealed to mistakes in the NSAC testing procedures, pointing to a pair of drug tests, one on 19 January and one after the fight, which Silva passed. He admitted to using both benzodiazepines the night prior to the fight as therapy to control stress and help him sleep. Silva's team was unable to explain the presence of androsterone in 9 January test. The commission rejected the defense and suspended him for one year retroactive to the date of the fight, as the current guidelines were not in effect at the time of the failed tests. He was also fined his full win bonus, as well as 30% of his show money, totaling $380,000. His victory was overturned to a no contest.

In his first fight after his PED suspension was lifted, Silva faced Michael Bisping on 27 February 2016, at UFC Fight Night 84. He lost the fight via unanimous decision. However, the fight was not without controversy as at the end of round three Silva dropped Bisping with a flying knee while Bisping was signaling to referee Herb Dean that he lost his mouthpiece. Silva believed he had won the bout and continued to celebrate as referee Herb Dean said the fight was not over, and it continued for another two rounds to the decision. Both participants were awarded Fight of the Night honors.

Silva was expected to face Uriah Hall on 14 May 2016, at UFC 198. However, Silva pulled out of the bout on 10 May after requiring a surgery to remove his gallbladder. As a result, Hall did not compete at the event.

Silva was a short notice replacement to face current UFC Light Heavyweight champion Daniel Cormier in a non-title bout on 9 July 2016, at UFC 200. Silva lost the fight via unanimous decision.

Silva faced Derek Brunson on 11 February 2017, at UFC 208. He was awarded a unanimous decision victory. 19 of 23 media outlets scored the bout in favor of Brunson.

Silva was expected to face Kelvin Gastelum on 3 June 2017, at UFC 212. However, Gastelum was pulled from the match-up after testing positive for marijuana. In turn, despite having two months to secure an opponent, Silva and promotion officials confirmed on 11 May that he would not compete at that event.

The bout with Gastelum was rescheduled and was expected to take place on 25 November 2017, at UFC Fight Night 122. However it was announced on 10 November 2017 that Silva would be pulled from the bout due to failing USADA drug test on 26 October. In July 2018, USADA announced that Silva had been exonerated from the failed test after finding contaminated supplements and received a one-year suspension from USADA dating back to November 2017 and would be free to resume fighting in November 2018.

Silva returned and faced Israel Adesanya on 10 February 2019, at UFC 234. He lost the fight via unanimous decision. This fight earned him the Fight of the Night award.

Silva faced Jared Cannonier on 11 May 2019 at UFC 237. He lost the fight via TKO in the first round after a kick from Cannonier to Silva's right leg injured him and rendered him unable to continue.

Silva faced Uriah Hall on 31 October 2020 at UFC Fight Night: Hall vs. Silva. He lost the fight via technical knockout in round four. In an Instagram post made after the fight, Silva hinted that his career in MMA was finished, though he did not officially announce retirement from the sport.

On 19 November 2020, the UFC announced that they had released Silva from his UFC contract, which would allow him to negotiate with other promotions.

At UFC 300 on 13 April 2024, it was announced that the first bout with Silva and Chael Sonnen that took place at UFC 117 on 8 August 2010 would be inducted into the UFC Hall of Fame Fight Wing during International Fight Week on 27 June 2024. Sonnen was present to accept the award.

== Boxing career ==
=== Professional career ===
==== Silva vs. Chávez Jr. ====
In March 2021, it was announced that Anderson Silva would fight Julio César Chávez Jr. in a boxing match on 19 June 2021. Silva won the fight by split decision. Silva threw more punches throughout the fight throwing a total of 392 punches while Chávez Jr only threw 153.

==== Silva vs. Ortiz ====
Silva faced former UFC Light Heavyweight Champion Tito Ortiz in a pro boxing bout on 11 September 2021. He won the fight via knockout in round one.

==== Silva vs. Paul ====
On 22 September 2022, it was announced that Silva would be facing YouTuber and professional boxer Jake Paul on 29 October in Phoenix, Arizona.

On the night of the fight, Silva lost to Paul by unanimous decision with the scores of 78–73 (twice) and 77–74, all in Paul's favor.

==== Silva vs. Woodley ====
On 4 December 2025, it was announced that Silva would face Tyron Woodley on the undercard of Jake Paul vs. Anthony Joshua on 19 December at the Kaseya Center in Miami, FL. Silva won the fight via technical knockout in round two.

=== Exhibition bouts ===
==== Silva vs. Machado ====
On 21 May 2022, Silva fought an eight round exhibition bout with fellow Brazilian MMA veteran Bruno Machado at a boxing event in Abu Dhabi. Despite a knockdown for Silva in the fifth, the fight would go the full distance, and no winner was declared.

==== Silva vs. Sonnen ====
Silva faced Chael Sonnen on 15 June 2024 in a five-round, two minute exhibition boxing bout at 216 pounds in São Paulo, Brazil. Silva and Sonnen faced each other twice in mixed martial arts in the UFC. The bout went the full five rounds and was declared a draw.

== Fighting style ==
An expert in Muay Thai, boxing and taekwondo, Silva is primarily a stand-up fighter. Owner of numerous UFC offensive striking records, Silva is widely regarded as one of the best strikers in the history of MMA and many consider him the best of all time. During his time in the UFC, he had a striking accuracy of 60%, attempting 1300 strikes and landing 779.

Silva's striking accuracy, knockout power, technically vicious Muay Thai and ability to counterstrike makes him a danger to his opponents. Silva's striking uses three major strengths: technical precision, the jab, and transitions and movement. Silva switches from southpaw to orthodox with little drop-off in effectiveness.

Anderson Silva is also widely considered one of the best defensive fighters in UFC history. He is characterized by his exceptional ability to roll with punches, using head movement and shoulder rolls to minimize damage while setting up counters. Additionally, Silva uses disciplined footwork, evasive head movement, and strategic lower-leg kicks to control distance and deter takedowns. He also boasts a 69% takedown defense in the UFC.

Although it has been claimed that his ground game is not as good as his stand-up, Silva has submitted notable grapplers, including Olympic wrestler Dan Henderson, Brazilian Jiu-Jitsu blackbelt Travis Lutter and Olympic alternate Chael Sonnen.

== Sponsors ==
A friend of Brazilian World Cup winner Ronaldo, in 2011 Silva became the first client to be marketed by 9INE, a sports marketing company co-owned by Ronaldo. Since August 2011, Anderson has been sponsored by Corinthians, his favorite football club. He is also sponsored by fast food chain Burger King. Previously he had also sponsorship deal with sportswear and equipment supplier Nike, which ended in late 2014 due to Nike's self removal from the UFC.

== Personal life ==
Silva has three sons and two daughters with his wife, Dayane.

Before he began his career as a professional fighter, Silva worked at McDonald's, and also as a file clerk. He considers Spider-Man, Bruce Lee, Muhammad Ali and his mother as biggest of his personal heroes, and has a stated love of comic books and comic book heroes.

Silva has said on numerous occasions that he believes long-time friend and former UFC Lightweight Champion and UFC Welterweight Champion B.J. Penn to be the greatest pound-for-pound fighter in the history of the sport.

Silva expressed interest in competing in the sport of taekwondo and boxing. He floated around the idea of competing at the Olympics in taekwondo and fighting Roy Jones Jr. in a boxing match.

Silva became a naturalized U.S. citizen in July 2019.

In 2011, Silva starred in a music video for the song "Ainda Bem" with Brazilian singer Marisa Monte. Silva has also starred in the 2014 action drama film Tapped Out and the 2019 crime action film The Invincible Dragon. In November 2023, Paramount+ released a drama 5-episode mini-series entitled Anderson "The Spider" Silva in the Brazilian and Canadian markets which documented Silva's life including his UFC career with Bruno Vinicius playing the role of Silva.

== Filmography ==
=== Television and film ===
Year	Title	Role
2009	Never Surrender	Spider
2009	Hell's Chain	King Anaconda
2011	Like Water	Himself
2013	Til Death Do Us Part 2	Andrew Silver
2013	Worms	Hairy (voice)
2014	Tapped Out	Anderson
2014	Monday Nights at Seven	Mateus
2017	Ultimate Beastmaster	Himself/host
2019	The Invincible Dragon	Alexander Sinclair

=== Music videos ===
Year	Title	Artist
2011	"Ainda Bem"	Marisa Monte

== Championships and accomplishments ==
=== Mixed martial arts ===
- Cage Rage Championships
  - Cage Rage Middleweight Championship (One time, Final)
  - Three successful title defenses
- Shooto
  - Shooto Middleweight Championship (One time)
- Ultimate Fighting Championship
  - UFC Hall of Fame (Pioneer wing, Class of 2023)
  - UFC Hall of Fame (Fight wing, Class of 2024) vs. Chael Sonnen 1 at UFC 117
  - UFC Middleweight Championship (One time)
    - Ten successful title defenses
      - Most successful title defenses in UFC Middleweight division history (10)
      - Most consecutive title defenses in UFC Middleweight division history (10)
        - Second most consecutive title defenses in UFC history (10) (behind Demetrious Johnson)
        - Third most combined title defenses in UFC history (10)
    - Longest title reign in UFC history (2457 days)
    - Most wins in UFC Middleweight title fights (11)
      - Tied (Amanda Nunes & Valentina Shevchenko) for fourth most wins in UFC title fights (11)
    - Most finishes in UFC title fights (9)
    - Most knockouts in UFC title fights (7)
    - Most knockdowns in UFC title fights (10)
    - Most UFC Middleweight title fights (13)
      - Fifth most UFC title fights (13)
    - Unified the UFC Middleweight and Pride World Welterweight Championships
  - Fight of the Night (Five times) vs. Dan Henderson, Forrest Griffin, Chael Sonnen 1, Michael Bisping, and Israel Adesanya
  - Knockout of the Night (Seven times) vs. Chris Leben, Rich Franklin (2), Nate Marquardt, Forrest Griffin, Vitor Belfort, and Chael Sonnen 2
    - Most "Knockout of the Night" awards in UFC history (7)
  - Submission of the Night (Two times) vs. Dan Henderson and Chael Sonnen 1
    - Most Post-Fight bonuses in UFC Middleweight division history (12)
    - Tied (Justin Gaethje) for seventh most Post-Fight bonuses in UFC history (14)
  - Second longest win streak in UFC history (16) (behind Islam Makhachev)
    - Longest win streak in UFC Middleweight division history (13)
    - Longest finish streak in modern UFC history (8)
  - Second most finishes in UFC Middleweight division history (11) (behind Gerald Meerschaert)
  - Tied (Uriah Hall & Thiago Santos) for most knockouts in UFC Middleweight division history (8)
    - Tied (Anthony Johnson, Thiago Santos, Dustin Poirier & Drew Dober) for fourth most knockouts in modern UFC history (11)
  - Tied (Israel Adesanya) for most knockdowns in UFC Middleweight division history (13)
    - Tied (Jeremy Stephens) for second most knockdowns in UFC history (18)
    - Tied (Maurício Rua) for fourth most knockdowns landed in Zuffa, LLC (UFC, Pride, WEC, Strikeforce) history (19)
  - Most main events in UFC history (21)
  - Tied (Derek Brunson & Robert Whittaker) for fourth most wins in UFC Middleweight division history (14)
  - Largest striking deficit in a comeback finish in a UFC Middleweight division bout (-60) (vs. Chael Sonnen 1)
  - Most leg kicks landed in a UFC Middleweight division bout (57) (vs. Thales Leites)
  - UFC.com Awards
    - 2006: Knockout of the Year vs. Rich Franklin 1 & Ranked #6 Knockout of the Year vs. Chris Leben
    - 2007: Ranked #2 Fighter of the Year & Ranked #9 Knockout of the Year vs. Rich Franklin 2
    - 2008: Ranked #4 Fighter of the Year & Ranked #3 Submission of the Year vs. Dan Henderson
    - 2009: Knockout of the Year vs. Forrest Griffin & Ranked #3 Fighter of the Year
    - 2010: Submission of the Year & Fight of the Year vs. Chael Sonnen 1
    - 2011: Ranked #3 Fighter of the Year & Ranked #5 Knockout of the Year vs. Vitor Belfort
    - 2012: Ranked #9 Fighter of the Year & Ranked #8 Fight of the Year vs. Chael Sonnen 2
    - 2013: Ranked #8 Fight of the Year vs. Chris Weidman 1
- Bloody Elbow
  - 2010 Fight of the Year vs. Chael Sonnen at UFC 117
  - 2010s Middleweight Fighter of the Decade
- ESPN
  - 2011 Knockout of the Year vs. Vitor Belfort on 5 February
  - #3 Ranked Men's MMA Fighter of the 21st Century
- Bleacher Report
  - 2010 Best Comeback of the Year vs. Chael Sonnen
  - 2012 #5 Ranked Fighter of the Year
- Inside MMA
  - 2011 KO Kick of the Year Bazzie Award vs. Vitor Belfort on 5 February
- MMA Live
  - 2010 Fight of the Year vs. Chael Sonnen on 7 August
- Sherdog
  - 2009 Beatdown of the Year vs. Forrest Griffin on 8 August
  - 2011 All-Violence 1st Team
  - Mixed Martial Arts Hall of Fame
- Spike Guys' Choice Awards
  - 2008 Most Dangerous Man
- Sports Illustrated
  - 2008 Fighter of the Year
- World MMA Awards
  - 2008 Fighter of the Year
  - 2010 Fight of the Year vs. Chael Sonnen on 7 August
  - 2011 Knockout of the Year vs. Vitor Belfort on 5 February
- Wrestling Observer Newsletter
  - Most Outstanding Fighter (2012)
  - MMA Most Valuable Fighter (2012)
- Fight Matrix
  - 2007 Male Fighter of the Year
  - 2008 Male Fighter of the Year
  - 2008 Most Noteworthy Match of the Year vs. Dan Henderson at UFC 82
  - 2013 Most Noteworthy Match of the Year vs. Chris Weidman II at UFC 168
- FIGHT! Magazine
  - 2007 Fighter of the Year
- MMA Fighting
  - 2006 Middleweight Fighter of the Year
  - 2008 #9 Ranked UFC Knockout of the Year vs. James Irvin at UFC Fight Night: Silva vs. Irvin
  - 2012 #3 Ranked Fighter of the Year
  - #5 Ranked UFC Fighter of All Time
- FanSided
  - 2000s MMA Fighter of the Decade
- Inside Pulse
  - 2000s MMA Fighter of the Decade
- Cagewriters
  - 2010 Finish of the Year vs. Chael Sonnen at UFC 117
- Rear Naked News
  - 2008 Most Exciting Fighter

== Mixed martial arts record ==
Professional record breakdown
46 matches	34 wins	11 losses
By knockout	23	4
By submission	3	2
By decision	8	4
By disqualification	0	1
No contests	1	

Res.	Record	Opponent	Method	Event	Date	Round	Time	Location	Notes
Loss	34–11 (1)	Uriah Hall	TKO (punches)	UFC Fight Night: Hall vs. Silva	31 October 2020	4	1:24	Las Vegas, Nevada, United States	
Loss	34–10 (1)	Jared Cannonier	TKO (leg kick)	UFC 237	11 May 2019	1	4:47	Rio de Janeiro, Brazil	
Loss	34–9 (1)	Israel Adesanya	Decision (unanimous)	UFC 234	10 February 2019	3	5:00	Melbourne, Australia	Fight of the Night.
Win	34–8 (1)	Derek Brunson	Decision (unanimous)	UFC 208	11 February 2017	3	5:00	Brooklyn, New York, United States	
Loss	33–8 (1)	Daniel Cormier	Decision (unanimous)	UFC 200	9 July 2016	3	5:00	Las Vegas, Nevada, United States	Light Heavyweight bout.
Loss	33–7 (1)	Michael Bisping	Decision (unanimous)	UFC Fight Night: Silva vs. Bisping	27 February 2016	5	5:00	London, England	Fight of the Night.
NC	33–6 (1)	Nick Diaz	NC (overturned by NSAC)	UFC 183	31 January 2015	5	5:00	Las Vegas, Nevada, United States	Originally a unanimous decision win for Silva; overturned after he tested positive for drostanolone and androsterone. Diaz also tested positive for marijuana.
Loss	33–6	Chris Weidman	TKO (leg injury)	UFC 168	28 December 2013	2	1:16	Las Vegas, Nevada, United States	For the UFC Middleweight Championship.
Loss	33–5	Chris Weidman	KO (punches)	UFC 162	6 July 2013	2	1:18	Las Vegas, Nevada, United States	Lost the UFC Middleweight Championship.
Win	33–4	Stephan Bonnar	TKO (knee to the body and punches)	UFC 153	13 October 2012	1	4:40	Rio de Janeiro, Brazil	Light Heavyweight bout. Bonnar tested positive for a boldenone metabolite.
Win	32–4	Chael Sonnen	TKO (knee to the body and punches)	UFC 148	7 July 2012	2	1:55	Las Vegas, Nevada, United States	Defended the UFC Middleweight Championship. Extended the record for consecutive UFC Middleweight title defenses (10). Knockout of the Night.
Win	31–4	Yushin Okami	TKO (punches)	UFC 134	27 August 2011	2	2:04	Rio de Janeiro, Brazil	Defended the UFC Middleweight Championship.
Win	30–4	Vitor Belfort	KO (front kick and punches)	UFC 126	5 February 2011	1	3:25	Las Vegas, Nevada, United States	Defended the UFC Middleweight Championship. Knockout of the Night.
Win	29–4	Chael Sonnen	Submission (triangle armbar)	UFC 117	7 August 2010	5	3:10	Oakland, California, United States	Defended the UFC Middleweight Championship. Submission of the Night. Fight of the Night. Fight of the Year. Submission of the Year. Sonnen tested positive for elevated testosterone levels.
Win	28–4	Demian Maia	Decision (unanimous)	UFC 112	10 April 2010	5	5:00	Abu Dhabi, United Arab Emirates	Defended the UFC Middleweight Championship.
Win	27–4	Forrest Griffin	KO (punch)	UFC 101	8 August 2009	1	3:23	Philadelphia, Pennsylvania, United States	Light Heavyweight bout. Knockout of the Night. Fight of the Night. Knockout of the Year. Griffin tested positive for illegal substances.
Win	26–4	Thales Leites	Decision (unanimous)	UFC 97	18 April 2009	5	5:00	Montreal, Quebec, Canada	Defended the UFC Middleweight Championship.
Win	25–4	Patrick Côté	TKO (knee injury)	UFC 90	25 October 2008	3	0:39	Rosemont, Illinois, United States	Defended the UFC Middleweight Championship.
Win	24–4	James Irvin	KO (punches)	UFC Fight Night: Silva vs. Irvin	19 July 2008	1	1:01	Las Vegas, Nevada, United States	Light Heavyweight bout. Irvin tested positive for methadone and oxymorphone.
Win	23–4	Dan Henderson	Submission (rear-naked choke)	UFC 82	1 March 2008	2	4:52	Columbus, Ohio, United States	Defended the UFC Middleweight Championship. Broke the record for the most consecutive UFC Middleweight title defenses (3). Submission of the Night. Fight of the Night.
Win	22–4	Rich Franklin	TKO (knees)	UFC 77	20 October 2007	2	1:07	Cincinnati, Ohio, United States	Defended the UFC Middleweight Championship. Knockout of the Night.
Win	21–4	Nate Marquardt	TKO (punches)	UFC 73	7 July 2007	1	4:50	Sacramento, California, United States	Defended the UFC Middleweight Championship. Knockout of the Night.
Win	20–4	Travis Lutter	TKO (submission to elbows)	UFC 67	3 February 2007	2	2:11	Las Vegas, Nevada, United States	Non-title bout; Lutter missed weight (187 lb).
Win	19–4	Rich Franklin	KO (knee)	UFC 64	14 October 2006	1	2:59	Las Vegas, Nevada, United States	Won the UFC Middleweight Championship. Knockout of the Night. Knockout of the Year.
Win	18–4	Chris Leben	KO (knee)	UFC Fight Night 5	28 June 2006	1	0:49	Las Vegas, Nevada, United States	UFC Middleweight title eliminator. Knockout of the Night.
Win	17–4	Tony Fryklund	KO (elbow)	Cage Rage 16	22 April 2006	1	2:02	London, England	Defended the Cage Rage Middleweight Championship.
Loss	16–4	Yushin Okami	DQ (illegal kick)	Rumble on the Rock 8	20 January 2006	1	2:33	Honolulu, Hawaii, United States	Welterweight tournament opening round. Silva was disqualified for delivering an up-kick to an opponent who had his knees on the ground.
Win	16–3	Curtis Stout	KO (punches)	Cage Rage 14	3 December 2005	1	4:59	London, England	Defended the Cage Rage Middleweight Championship.
Win	15–3	Jorge Rivera	TKO (knees and punches)	Cage Rage 11	30 April 2005	2	3:53	London, England	Defended the Cage Rage Middleweight Championship.
Loss	14–3	Ryo Chonan	Submission (flying scissor heel hook)	Pride Shockwave 2004	31 December 2004	3	3:08	Saitama, Japan	
Win	14–2	Lee Murray	Decision (unanimous)	Cage Rage 8	11 September 2004	3	5:00	London, England	Won the Cage Rage Middleweight Championship.
Win	13–2	Jeremy Horn	Decision (unanimous)	Gladiator 2	27 June 2004	3	5:00	Seoul, South Korea	
Win	12–2	Waldir dos Anjos	TKO (corner stoppage)	Conquista Fight 1	20 December 2003	1	5:00	Vitória da Conquista, Brazil	
Loss	11–2	Daiju Takase	Submission (triangle choke)	Pride 26	8 June 2003	1	8:33	Yokohama, Japan	
Win	11–1	Carlos Newton	KO (flying knee and punches)	Pride 25	16 March 2003	1	6:27	Yokohama, Japan	
Win	10–1	Alexander Otsuka	Decision (unanimous)	Pride 22	29 September 2002	3	5:00	Nagoya, Japan	
Win	9–1	Alex Stiebling	TKO (doctor stoppage)	Pride 21	23 June 2002	1	1:23	Saitama, Japan	
Win	8–1	Roan Carneiro	TKO (submission to punches)	Mecca 6	31 January 2002	1	5:32	Curitiba, Brazil	
Win	7–1	Hayato Sakurai	Decision (unanimous)	Shooto 7	26 August 2001	3	5:00	Osaka, Japan	Won the Shooto Middleweight (168 lb) Championship.
Win	6–1	Israel Albuquerque	TKO (submission to punches)	Mecca 5	9 June 2001	1	6:17	Curitiba, Brazil	
Win	5–1	Tetsuji Kato	Decision (unanimous)	Shooto 2	2 March 2001	3	5:00	Tokyo, Japan	
Win	4–1	Claudionor Fontinelle	TKO (punches and knees)	Mecca 4	16 December 2000	1	4:35	Curitiba, Brazil	
Win	3–1	Jose Barreto	TKO (head kick and punches)	Mecca 2	12 August 2000	1	1:06	Curitiba, Brazil	
Loss	2–1	Luiz Azeredo	Decision (unanimous)	Mecca 1	27 May 2000	2	10:00	Curitiba, Brazil	
Win	2–0	Fabrício Camões	TKO (retirement)	BFC 1	25 June 1997	1	25:14	Campo Grande, Brazil	
Win	1–0	Raimundo Pinheiro	Submission (rear-naked choke)	BFC 1	25 June 1997	1	1:53	Campo Grande, Brazil	

== Boxing record ==
=== Professional ===
6 fights	4 wins	2 losses
By knockout	3	1
By decision	1	1

No.	Result	Record	Opponent	Type	Round, time	Date	Location	Notes
6	Win	4–2	Tyron Woodley	TKO	2 (6), 1:33	19 Dec 2025	Kaseya Center, Miami, Florida. U.S.	
5	Loss	3–2	Jake Paul	UD	8	29 Oct 2022	Desert Diamond Arena, Glendale, Arizona, U.S.	
4	Win	3–1	Tito Ortiz	KO	1 (8), 1:22	11 Sep 2021	Seminole Hard Rock Hotel & Casino, Hollywood, Florida, U.S.	
3	Win	2–1	Julio César Chávez Jr.	SD	8	19 Jun 2021	Estadio Jalisco, Guadalajara, Mexico	
2	Win	1–1	Julio Cesar De Jesus	KO	2 (6), 0:19	5 May 2005	Ginásio de Esportes Antônio Balbino, Salvador, Brazil	
1	Loss	0–1	Osmar Luiz Teixeira	RTD	1 (6), 3:00	22 May 1998	Ginásio Isael Pastuch, União da Vitória, Brazil	

=== Exhibition ===
2 fights	0 wins	0 losses
Draws	1	
Non-scored	1	

No.	Result	Record	Opponent	Type	Round, time	Date	Location	Notes
2	Draw	0–0–1 (1)	Chael Sonnen	—N/a	5	Jun 15, 2024	São Paulo, Brazil	
1	—N/a	0–0 (1)	Bruno Machado	—N/a	8	May 21, 2022	Etihad Arena, Yas Island, Abu Dhabi, U.A.E.	Non-scored bout

== Muay Thai record ==
Kickboxing record
1 Wins ,0 losses
Date	Result	Opponent	Event	Location	Method	Round	Time
2003-04-13	Win	(Brazil) Tadeu Sanmartino	Storm Muay Thai	Brazil	Knockout (Kicks, Punch)	1	2:57

== Pay-per-view bouts ==
=== MMA ===
No.	Event	Fight	Date	PPV Buys
1.	UFC 64	Franklin vs. Silva	14 October 2006	300,000
2.	UFC 67	Silva vs. Luter	3 February 2007	400,000
3.	UFC 73	Silva vs. Marquardt	7 July 2007	425,000
4.	UFC 77	Silva vs. Franklin 2	20 October 2007	325,000
5.	UFC 82	Silva vs. Henderson	1 March 2008	325,000
6.	UFC 90	Silva vs. Côté	25 October 2008	300,000
7.	UFC 97	Silva vs. Leites	18 April 2009	650,000
8.	UFC 101	Silva vs. Griffin (co)	8 August 2009	850,000
9.	UFC 112	Silva vs. Maia	10 April 2010	500,000
10.	UFC 117	Silva vs. Sonnen	7 August 2010	600,000
11.	UFC 126	Silva vs. Belfort	5 February 2011	725,000
12.	UFC 134	Silva vs. Okami	27 August 2011	335,000
13.	UFC 148	Silva vs. Sonnen 2	7 July 2012	925,000
14.	UFC 153	Silva vs. Bonnar	13 October 2012	375,000
15.	UFC 162	Silva vs. Weidman	6 July 2013	550,000
16.	UFC 168	Weidman vs. Silva 2	28 December 2013	1,025,000
17.	UFC 183	Silva vs. Diaz	31 January 2015	650,000
18.	UFC 208	Silva vs. Brunson (co)	11 February 2017	200,000
19.	UFC 234	Adesanya vs. Silva	10 February 2019	175,000
Total sales				9,635,000

=== Boxing ===
==== Main Event ====
United States
No.	Date	Fight	Billing	Buys	Network	Revenue
1	June 19, 2021	Chávez Jr. vs. Silva	Tribute to the Kings	—N/a	FITE TV	—N/a
2	October 29, 2022	Paul vs. Silva	—N/a	300,000	Showtime	$17,997,000
Total				300,000		$17,997,000

==== Co-Main Event ====
United States
No.	Date	Fight	Billing	Buys	Network	Revenue
1	May 21, 2022	Mayweather Jr. vs. Moore; Silva vs. Machado	The Showcase in the Skies of Dubai	—N/a	FITE TV	—N/a
2	May 21, 2022	Holyfield vs. Belfort; Silva vs. Ortiz	No Holds Barred	150,000	Triller	$7,500,000
Total				150,000		$7,500,000

== See also ==
- List of male boxers
- List of male mixed martial artists
- List of mixed martial artists with professional boxing records
- List of multi-sport athletes

Achievements
Vacant Title last held by Paul Jenkins	2nd Cage Rage Middleweight Champion; 11 September 2004 – 20 October 2008	Parent promotion EliteXC folded
Preceded by Rich Franklin	5th UFC Middleweight Champion; 14 October 2006 – 6 July 2013	Succeeded by Chris Weidman
Awards
New award	World MMA Fighter of the Year; 2008	Succeeded by Georges St-Pierre
Preceded by Diego Sanchez vs. Clay Guida	World MMA Fight of the Year; 2010 vs. Chael Sonnen at UFC 117	Succeeded by Frankie Edgar vs. Gray Maynard
Preceded by Maurício Rua	World MMA Knockout of the Year; 2011 vs. Vitor Belfort	Succeeded by Edson Barboza
UFC records
Preceded by Royce Gracie	Most consecutive wins August 7, 2010 – present 16	Incumbent
