= Julio César Chávez Jr. vs. Anderson Silva =

Boxing match

Tribute to the Kings
- Date: June 19, 2021
- Venue: Estadio Jalisco, Guadalajara, Jalisco, Mexico

Tale of the tape
Boxer	Julio César Chávez Jr.	Anderson Silva
Nickname	La Leyenda Continúa ("The Legend Continues")	"The Spider"
Hometown	Culiacán, Sinaloa, Mexico	São Paulo, Brazil
Pre-fight record	52–5–1 (34 KOs)	1–1 (1 KOs)
Height	6 ft 1 in (185 cm)	6 ft 2 in (188 cm)
Weight	164 lb (74 kg)	187 1/2 lb (85 kg)
Style	Orthodox	Southpaw
Recognition	Former middleweight champion	Former UFC Middleweight Champion

Result
- Silva wins via 8-round split decision (77-75, 77-75, 77-75)

Julio César Chávez Jr. vs. Anderson Silva, billed as "Tribute to the Kings", was a professional crossover boxing match held on June 19, 2021, at the Estadio Jalisco in Guadalajara, Jalisco, Mexico. Former UFC middleweight champion Silva was declared the winner by split decision.

== Background ==
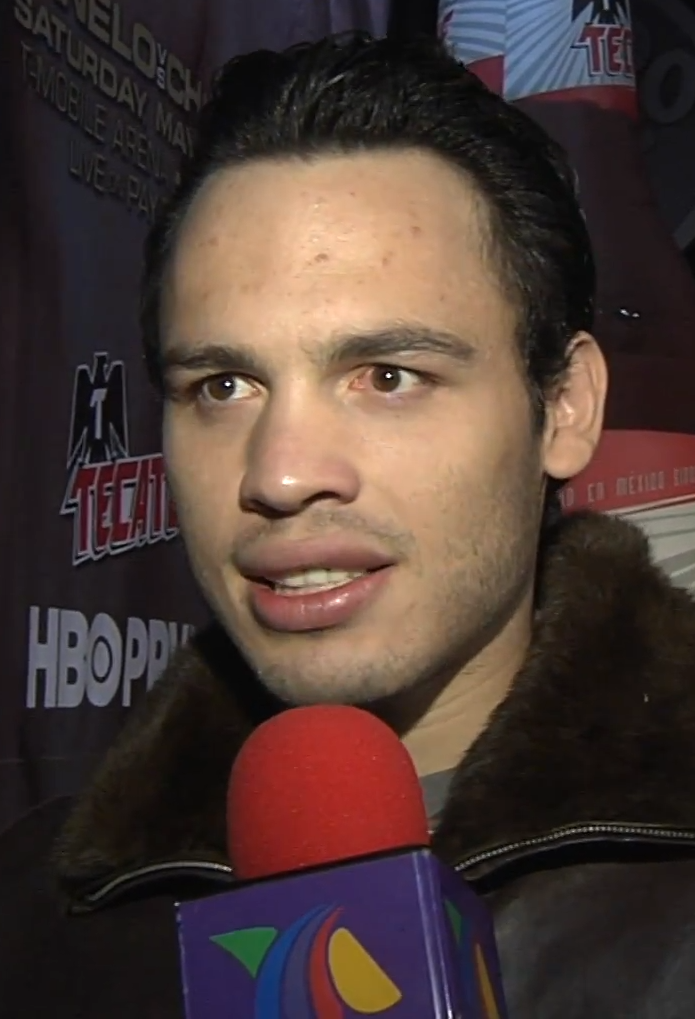
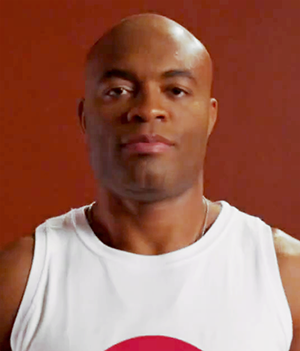
Julio César Chávez Jr. (left) and Anderson Silva (right).

At a March 2021 press conference Chávez announced his opponent was Anderson Silva who was switching to boxing from MMA. The fight was to be held on 19 June 2021. Chávez Jr missed the contractual weight of 182 lbs. after weighing in at 184.4 lbs. and forfeited $100,000 of his purse to Silva. Silva won the fight via split decision. Silva was the busier fighter throughout the fight throwing a total of 392 punches versus Chávez Jr's 153.
