= Chael Sonnen =

American mixed martial artist

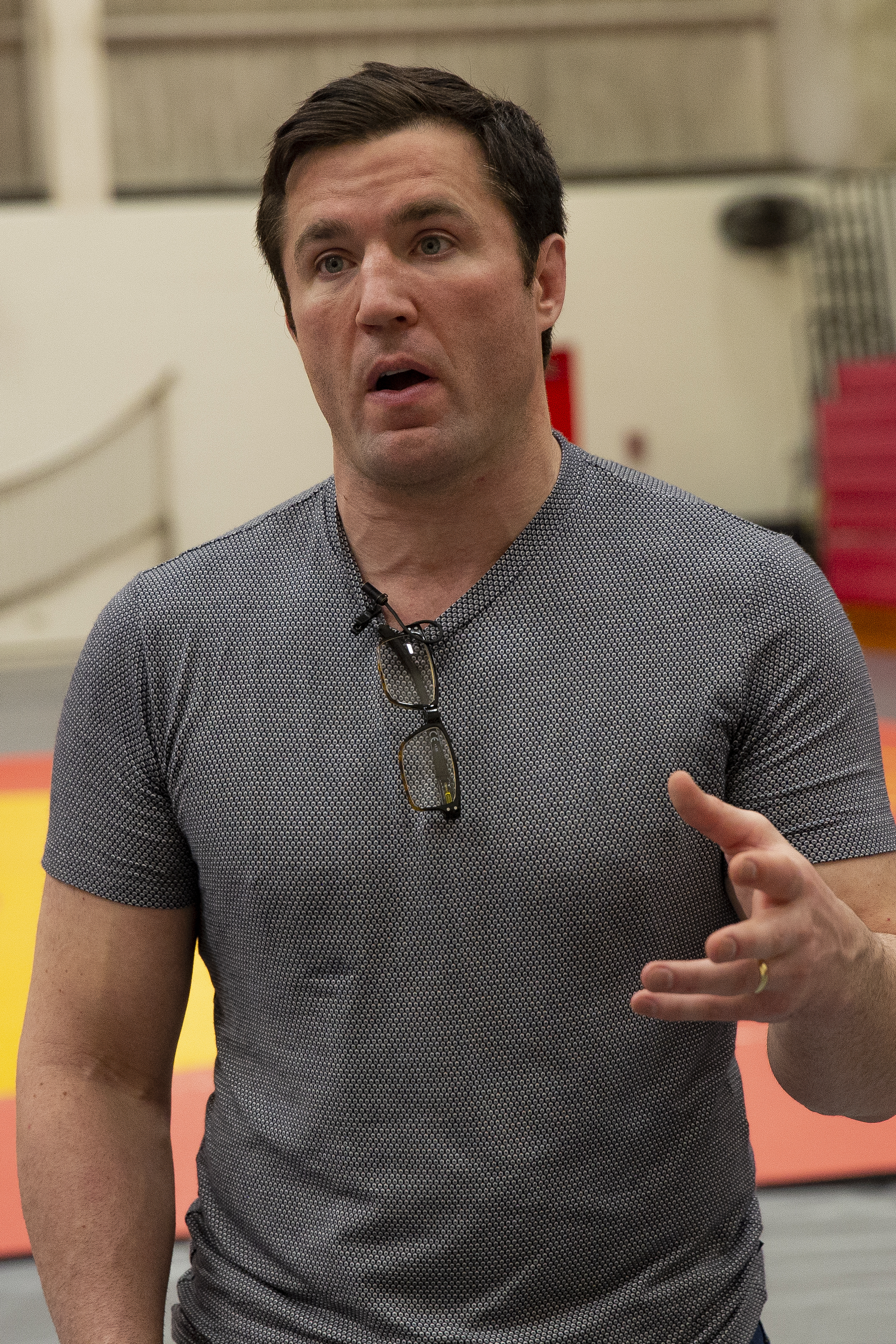
- Sonnen in 2018
- Born: April 3, 1977 (age 49); Clackamas County, Oregon, U.S.
- Height: 6 ft 1 in (1.85 m)
- Weight: 205 lb (93 kg; 14.6 st)
- Division: Middleweight (2005–2012); Light Heavyweight (2002–2005, 2013, 2017, 2019); Heavyweight (2018–2019)
- Reach: 73 in (185 cm)
- Style: Wrestling
- Stance: Southpaw
- Fighting out of: West Linn, Oregon, U.S.
- Team: Team Quest; Gracie Barra Portland
- Rank: Black belt in Brazilian Jiu-Jitsu under Fabiano Scherner
- Wrestling: NCAA Division I wrestling Olympic Greco-Roman trialist
- Years active: 1997–2013, 2017–2019 (MMA)

Mixed martial arts record
- Total: 49
- Wins: 31
- By knockout: 8
- By submission: 4
- By decision: 19
- Losses: 17
- By knockout: 7
- By submission: 9
- By decision: 1
- Draws: 1

Amateur record
- Total: 2
- Wins: 2
- By knockout: 2

Other information
- Occupation: Mixed martial artist, promoter and entrepreneur
- University: University of Oregon
- Website: chaelsonnen.com
- Mixed martial arts record from Sherdog
Medal record
Men's Greco-Roman wrestling
Representing the United States
World University Championships
Silver medal – second place	2000 Tokyo	85 kg
Dave Schultz Memorial International
Gold medal – first place	2000 Colorado Springs	85 kg
Gold medal – first place	2001 Colorado Springs	97 kg
Bronze medal – third place	2002 Colorado Springs	84 kg
Men's collegiate wrestling
Representing the Oregon Ducks
Pac-10 Championships
Silver medal – second place	1999 Stanford	197 lb
Silver medal – second place	2001 Eugene	197 lb

YouTube information
- Channel: Chael Sonnen
- Subscribers: 1.34 million
- Views: 838.7 million
- Last updated: January 16, 2026

Chael Sonnen (/ˈtʃeɪl ˈsʌnən/; born April 3, 1977) is an American sports commentator, mixed martial arts (MMA) analyst, submission grappling promoter, and retired mixed martial artist. Beginning his MMA career in 1997, Sonnen competed for the Ultimate Fighting Championship (UFC), where he became a top contender in both the light heavyweight and middleweight divisions and challenged for both the UFC Light Heavyweight and UFC Middleweight Championships. Sonnen has also fought in World Extreme Cagefighting, Pancrase, and most recently for Bellator MMA. Sonnen is often considered one of the best mixed martial artists never to have won a major MMA world championship and one of the sport's greatest trash-talkers.

In 2014, Sonnen began working as a MMA analyst for ESPN and two years later, in July 2016, founded Submission Underground (SUG), his own submission grappling promotion. He is currently the lead commentator for Real American Freestyle, a professional freestyle wrestling promotion.

== Early life ==
Sonnen was born in either Milwaukie, Oregon, or West Linn, Oregon (sources differ) to Patrick and Claudia Sonnen. Chael grew up wealthy due to his father's successful plumbing and real estate businesses, and describes his upbringing as "great." Sonnen's mother, a former high school teacher, has referred to Chael as a "momma's boy" in his early childhood, and described him as a carefree youth with a contrarian streak.

With his father, uncles, and older cousins all having wrestled themselves, Chael began began wrestling at age nine and showed early potential. Starting in his teenage years, Sonnen began receiving private coaching by future Olympic Greco-Roman silver medalist and UFC title challenger Matt Lindland, who had worked as a plumber's assistant in his father's company. He attended West Linn High School, where he was an Oregon state runner-up. At one point in his high school wrestling tenure, Sonnen would wrestle Lindland in the first round of the Sunkist International Open, losing what both describe as a dominant match. In 1996, Sonnen began training in boxing and kickboxing, having hoped to compete in the UFC since high school and intending to transition sports after the end of his collegiate wrestling career.

After high school, Sonnen first attended Brigham Young University, before transferring to the University of Oregon in Eugene, after BYU began considering cutting its wrestling program. At the University of Oregon, Sonnen earned NCAA Division I All-American honors and was a two-time PAC-10 runner-up, a silver medalist at the 2000 Greco-Roman World University Championships, and a two-time Dave Schultz Memorial International Greco-Roman winner. He graduated from the University of Oregon in 2001, with a Bachelor of Science degree in sociology.

== Mixed martial arts career ==
=== Early career ===
Sonnen started his mixed martial arts career in 1997 at the age of 19, by defeating Ben Hailey in Vancouver, Washington. According to Sonnen, his mother videotaped the fight and his father became an avid supporter of Sonnen's MMA career after watching it. Sonnen would join Team Quest - a pioneering MMA training center in Portland founded by Randy Couture, Dan Henderson, and Matt Lindland - soon after its opening in 2000.

Five years after his debut, he defeated future ICON Sport Middleweight Champion and Strikeforce Middleweight contender Jason "Mayhem" Miller. He won four more straight fights that year, before his first professional loss to Trevor Prangley. In late 2003, he was submitted by future Ultimate Fighter winner and UFC Light Heavyweight Champion Forrest Griffin with a triangle choke submission maneuver.

=== Ultimate Fighting Championship ===
Sonnen made his UFC debut in a Light Heavyweight bout against former IFC Light Heavyweight Champion Renato Sobral at UFC 55, submitting to a second-round triangle choke. He then avenged his first loss, by winning a unanimous decision over Trevor Prangley at UFC Ultimate Fight Night 4. At UFC 60, he fought Jeremy Horn for the third time and submitted to an armbar. Shortly after, he was released from the UFC.

=== Bodog Fight ===
In May 2006, Sonnen debuted for Bodog Fight, defeating Tim Credeur via TKO. He went on to win a unanimous decision over Alexey Oleinik, defeat Tim McKenzie in 13 seconds with a D'arce choke, and finish UFC and PRIDE veteran Amar Suloev via TKO. After leaving Bodog, Sonnen defeated future Ultimate Fighter member Kyacey Uscola at SuperFight 20: Homecoming.

=== World Extreme Cagefighting ===
In December 2007, Sonnen fought Paulo Filho for the WEC Middleweight Championship. Sonnen lost via a controversial submission at 4:55 of the second round. Sonnen did not tap out but screamed in pain, which the referee interpreted as a verbal submission. In his post-fight interview, Sonnen said he told the referee not to stop the fight, and continually said "No" when the referee asked if he wanted to submit. Keith Kizer, executive director of the Nevada State Athletic Commission, claimed Sonnen only yelled "No" after the referee stopped the fight. Kizer and Dana White (who was watching ringside) both agreed with the call.

A rematch was scheduled for March 26, 2008, but was cancelled after Filho entered a drug rehabilitation program. Sonnen instead faced undefeated contender Bryan Baker and dominated him for three rounds to win a unanimous decision (30–26, 30–25, and 30–25). Sonnen and Filho eventually met again on November 5, 2008. Filho appeared distracted throughout the bout, and Sonnen took advantage winning all three rounds to win the fight via unanimous decision. Prior to the fight, Filho weighed in almost seven pounds over the 185-pound limit, so the bout was ruled a non-title match. After Filho lost, he announced he would ship Sonnen the championship belt.

=== Return to the UFC ===
Following the dissolution of WEC's middleweight division, Sonnen returned to the UFC.

In his first fight for the promotion since UFC 60, he was submitted by jiu-jitsu ace Demian Maia via triangle choke submission at UFC 95.

At UFC 98 in May 2009, Sonnen defeated Dan Miller via unanimous decision. He was a late replacement for Yushin Okami, who tore a ligament while training. He took the fight on 22 days' notice, and lost 36 pounds (16 kg) in order to compete.

In his next fight, at UFC 104, Sonnen outwrestled Okami for a unanimous decision victory.

Sonnen was expected to face Nate Marquardt at UFC 110, but the fight was moved to UFC 109 on February 6. Sonnen won a unanimous decision, after escaping two deep guillotine chokes in the first and third rounds. With the victory, Sonnen became the number one contender for the UFC Middleweight Championship.

==== Silva vs. Sonnen ====
At UFC 117 on August 7, 2010, Sonnen challenged Anderson Silva for the UFC Middleweight Championship. Sonnen had trash talked to hype the fight, stating he was going to retire Silva. Sonnen put on a dominant performance, stunning Silva early with his boxing, and then dominating the fight with his wrestling, heading into the fifth round, Sonnen was ahead on the judges' scorecards (40–34, 40–36, and 40–35). At 3:10 into the final round, Silva caught Sonnen in a triangle armbar and made him tap out. In a later interview, Sonnen stated it was the choke, not the armbar, that made him submit. The fight earned both fighters Fight of the Night honors, and was considered to be the best fight of the year by many critics. The fight was later awarded 'Fight of the Year' by World MMA Awards.

=== CSAC suspensions and appeals ===
Urinalysis conducted after his loss to Anderson Silva showed Sonnen had an unallowably high testosterone/epitestosterone (T/E) ratio of 16.9:1 at the time of the fight. An average man has a T/E ratio of 1:1, and testing bodies may allow a ratio as high as 4:1 for athletes undergoing TRT treatment. In other words, Sonnen's T/E ratio was nearly 17 times than a normal man's and over four times the allowed maximum for an athlete. He was fined $2,500 and suspended for one year (until September 2, 2011) by the California State Athletic Commission (CSAC). His scheduled rematch with Silva was subsequently cancelled.

==== Initial appeal ====
Sonnen appealed the CSAC's decision. The hearing was held on December 2, 2010. The principal grounds of his appeal were that he had a medical justification for taking testosterone, and he believed he had taken the necessary steps to disclose the condition and its treatment to the CSAC. He testified he had been diagnosed with hypogonadism in 2008 and was undergoing testosterone replacement therapy (TRT), self-injecting synthetic testosterone two times a week. Sonnen's physician, Dr. Mark Czarnecki, was present at the hearing and attested to these claims.

In his sworn testimony, Sonnen claimed to have been previously approved for TRT by the Nevada State Athletic Commission (NSAC), and to have spoken directly to NSAC's Executive Director, Keith Kizer, who informed him he was approved for TRT and should not again disclose the treatment on the pre-bout medical disclosure statements required by the NSAC. He said he believed this advice about disclosure also applied to the forms of other state athletic commissions. He said he had previously disclosed his condition to the CSAC before his UFC 104 bout with Yushin Okami, which took place in Los Angeles on October 24, 2009. Based on his testimony, the CSAC voted to recharacterize Sonnen's transgression as a failure to properly disclose a medical treatment, and correspondingly reduced his suspension from twelve months to six, ending March 2, 2011.

Keith Kizer publicly responded to Sonnen's testimony, claiming the NSAC had never approved Sonnen for TRT, Sonnen had never applied for the approval process, and he had "never talked to Chael Sonnen in [his] life." At a subsequent meeting between the UFC, Sonnen and the NSAC, Kizer asked Sonnen about his testimony at the December 2, 2010, CSAC hearing. According to Kizer, Sonnen initially deflected his questions but, when pressed further, admitted no conversation between Kizer and himself had occurred. Sonnen explained "My manager and you talked about therapeutic exemptions, and therefore, I just used the wrong word. I should have said 'my' instead of 'I.' As in 'my manager' instead of 'I'". Kizer called this a "strange story" and a "ridiculous explanation" Kizer acknowledged speaking with Sonnen's manager (Matt Lindland) about TRT, but said the conversation concerned only the procedure itself, not the application of any particular fighter.

CSAC Executive Director George Dodd has also contradicted Sonnen's testimony, stating the CSAC has no documentary evidence of Sonnen ever being approved for TRT.

==== Subsequent suspension by CSAC ====
Sonnen's abbreviated CSAC suspension expired on March 2, 2011. However, in the third week of April 2011, the CSAC announced it had reversed its decision to lower his sentence, and had placed him on indefinite administrative suspension due to his conviction for money laundering (see below) and his possibly false testimony during the hearing of December 2, 2010. Sonnen appeared before the CSAC on May 18, 2011, requesting the suspension be lifted. After hearing testimony from Keith Kizer via streaming video, as well as from Sonnen and his supporters, the CSAC voted 4–1 to uphold the suspension. Two days later, the CSAC clarified that the applicable regulations only allowed Sonnen to be suspended until his existing license expired (on June 29, 2011). If Sonnen applied for a new license after June 29, 2011, he would have to reappear before the CSAC, which could deny the application.

=== Second return to the UFC ===
After his suspension, Sonnen returned to the UFC on October 8, 2011, defeating Brian Stann with a second round arm triangle choke at UFC 136.

Sonnen was expected to face Mark Muñoz on January at UFC on Fox 2, but Muñoz was injured and replaced by Michael Bisping. Sonnen was awarded the unanimous decision (30–27, 29–28, and 29–28) victory after three rounds.

==== Silva vs. Sonnen II ====
A rematch with Anderson Silva was scheduled UFC 147, but the bout was moved to UFC 148 on July 7, 2012, after a scheduling conflict with the UN Conference on Sustainable Development forced UFC 147 into a smaller venue. The fight was considered by many analysts and several major media outlets as the most highly anticipated bout in UFC history.

The fight looked to be similar to the first, as Sonnen immediately took down Silva and dominated him with wrestling and ground and pound strikes. One cageside judge scored it a 10–8 round as Silva was credited with zero strikes. However, Sonnen would be unable to score a takedown in the second round, and attempted a spinning backfist that missed, causing him to lose his balance, with Silva connecting with a knee to the body and finishing Sonnen with punches, losing the fight by TKO in the second round.

==== Return to light heavyweight ====
On August 14, 2012, on UFC Tonight, Sonnen announced he would face Forrest Griffin in a Light Heavyweight rematch on December 29, 2012, at UFC 155. But the rematch with Griffin was scrapped after Sonnen was named as a coach for The Ultimate Fighter 17 against Light Heavyweight Champion Jon Jones.

A bout between Sonnen and Jones for the UFC Light Heavyweight Championship took place on April 27, 2013, at UFC 159. Sonnen originally accepted a fight with Jon Jones for the title at UFC 151, after Jones's original challenger Dan Henderson was injured, but Jones declined. Some fighters were upset with his title opportunity because Sonnen, "arguably the most legendary talker in UFC history", had not fought since returning to the light heavyweight division. Dana White defended the matchup, saying "Sonnen was willing to fly over to Las Vegas to fight Jones on the same day", while other contenders like Maurício Rua and Lyoto Machida turned the offer down.

Jon Jones showed a lack of interest in the fight and downplayed the contest, making it clear that he did not believe Sonnen to be a worthy contender. In an interview, Sonnen did his best to hype up interest but Jones gave him "silent treatment", refusing to make eye contact. Jones dispatched the challenger using Sonnen's own style of dominant top control and ground and pound to defeat him via TKO in the first round. Despite the dominant performance from Jones, Sonnen was likely only 27 seconds away from winning the title, as it was later discovered that, while defending a takedown, Jones suffered a serious toe injury that could have resulted in a doctor's stoppage TKO loss had the bout continued to the second round.

Sonnen was expected to face Maurício Rua on June 15, 2013, at UFC 161, replacing Antônio Rogério Nogueira, who had pulled out of the bout citing a back injury. However, issues relating to obtaining a visa meant Sonnen was not able to get into Canada, and Rua ended up being pulled from the event altogether. The bout with Rua eventually took place on August 17, 2013, at UFC Fight Night 26. Sonnen won via a guillotine choke submission in the first round.

Sonnen faced Rashad Evans on November 16, 2013, at UFC 167. He lost the fight via TKO in the first round.

==== The Ultimate Fighter: Brazil 3 and failed drug tests ====
On October 22, 2013, it was announced that Sonnen would be coaching The Ultimate Fighter: Brazil 3, against long-time rival Wanderlei Silva. A bout with Silva, briefly attached to UFC 173, then at The Ultimate Fighter: Brazil 3 Finale, was expected to take place on July 5, 2014, at UFC 175. Dana White later stated the fight had to be rescheduled because Silva injured his hand from a brawl with Sonnen that took place during the filming of the show. Silva was ultimately pulled from the fight entirely after he failed to submit an application to fight in the state of Nevada, as well as his refusal to undergo a random drug test and was replaced by Vitor Belfort. However, Sonnen subsequently failed his random drug test and was removed from the bout.

==== First retirement and Fox Sports termination ====
Following the controversy of his second failed drug test, Sonnen announced on the June 11, 2014, episode of UFC Tonight his retirement from MMA competition.

Subsequent to his retirement, it was revealed on June 28, 2014, by the NSAC that Sonnen had failed a second random drug test—the third failed drug test throughout his MMA career—due to the presence of human growth hormone (HGH), recombinant human erythropoietin (EPO), anastrozole, and human chorionic gonadotropin (hCG).

On June 30, 2014, Fox Sports announced they had terminated Sonnen's contract as a UFC analyst due to his multiple failed drug tests. On July 23, 2014, the NSAC ruled that Sonnen would be suspended for 2 years from martial arts competition worldwide due to his multiple failed drugs tests.

==== Hall of Fame induction ====
At UFC 300 on April 13, 2024, it was announced that the first bout with Sonnen and Anderson Silva that took place at UFC 117 on August 8, 2010, would be inducted into the UFC Hall of Fame Fight Wing during International Fight Week on June 27, 2024. Sonnen was present to accept the award.

==== The Ultimate Fighter 33 ====
Sonnen and former UFC Heavyweight and UFC Light Heavyweight Champion Daniel Cormier served as coaches for The Ultimate Fighter 33.

=== Bellator MMA ===
On September 15, 2016, it was reported that Sonnen had signed a multi-fight contract with Bellator MMA.

Sonnen made his promotional debut in a light heavyweight match against former UFC Light Heavyweight Champion and UFC Hall-of-Famer Tito Ortiz on January 21, 2017, in the main event at Bellator 170. He lost the fight via submission in the first round.

His second promotional fight was a rescheduled match up against Wanderlei Silva on June 24, 2017, in the main event at Bellator NYC. He won the fight via unanimous decision (30–26, 30–27, and 30–27). He got knocked down in the first round but dominated the rest of the fight to guarantee a win over his long-time rival. In his post-fight speech, he called for a bout with heavyweight Fedor Emelianenko, who had lost earlier on the card.

==== Heavyweight Grand Prix ====
Sonnen faced Quinton Jackson for the Bellator Heavyweight World Grand Prix Tournament on January 20, 2018, at Bellator 192. He won the fight via unanimous decision, securing a takedown in each round to establish the win.

Sonnen faced Fedor Emelianenko next in the semifinals of the Bellator Heavyweight Grand Prix tournament on October 13, 2018, at Bellator 208. He lost the fight via TKO in the first round.

==== Return to light heavyweight and second retirement ====
On April 4, 2019, it was announced that Sonnen would face Lyoto Machida on June 14, 2019, at Bellator 222 in Bellator's return to Madison Square Garden. He lost the fight via TKO in the second round. Sonnen announced his retirement from MMA in the post-fight interview.

== Other endeavors ==
=== Professional wrestling involvement ===
==== World Championship Wrestling (1998) ====
Sonnen had an interest in pursuing a career in professional wrestling, and he attended a try out for World Championship Wrestling (WCW) at the WCW Power Plant in the summer of 1998. Sonnen successfully made it through the try out but, due to financial difficulties, could not continue his professional wrestling training. Afterwards, Sonnen instead shifted his focus on his mixed martial arts career.

==== Global Force Wrestling (2015) ====
On May 6, 2015, it was announced that Sonnen would be joining Global Force Wrestling (GFW), a promotion founded in 2014 by Jeff Jarrett. The promotion ran several live events and tapings for a potential television show, which would end up being called GFW Amped. Sonnen joined the GFW Amped broadcast team as an "expert analyst", making his return to professional wrestling after nearly 17 years. GFW Amped ultimately did not get picked up by a television network but did later air as part of Impact Wrestling's One Night Only pay-per-view series.

=== Political candidacy ===
Sonnen ran as the Republican candidate for the 37th district of the Oregon House of Representatives in 2010. That June, he dropped out of the race, referring to a 2006 legal issue involving real estate.

=== Analyst career ===
On November 11, 2014, ESPN announced it had hired Sonnen as an MMA analyst. He debuted on November 14, previewing UFC 180.

On September 2, 2015, it was announced that Sonnen signed with the World Series of Fighting (WSOF) to become a member of their broadcast team beginning at WSOF 23.

Upon joining Bellator MMA in 2016, Sonnen signed on as an analyst for Bellator in addition to being a fighter, providing commentary on numerous Bellator events.

Sonnen was hired as the lead commentator for Real American Freestyle in May 2025.

=== Boxing career ===
Sonnen faced Anderson Silva on June 15, 2024, in a five-round, two minute exhibition boxing bout at 216 pounds in São Paulo, Brazil. Silva and Sonnen faced each other twice in mixed martial arts in the UFC. The bout went the full five rounds and was declared a draw.

== Championships and accomplishments ==
=== Amateur wrestling ===
- National Collegiate Athletic Association
  - NCAA Division I All-American out of University of Oregon (1998)
  - NCAA Division I 190 lb – 8th place out of University of Oregon (1998)
  - Pac-10 Conference 197 lb – 2nd place out of University of Oregon (1999)
  - Pac-10 Conference 197 lb – 2nd place out of University of Oregon (2001)
- University National Greco-Roman Championships
  - 187.25 lb – 3rd place out of University of Oregon (1997)
  - 187.25 lb – 2nd place out of University of Oregon (1998)
  - 187.25 lb – 1st place out of University of Oregon (1999)
  - 187.25 lb – 1st place out of University of Oregon (2000)
  - Awarded "Most Outstanding Wrestler" of 2000 tournament
- World University Greco-Roman Championships
  - 187.25 lb – 2nd place (2000)
- Senior National Greco-Roman Championships
  - 187.25 lb – 4th place (2000)
  - 185 lb – 4th place (2002)
- 2000 US Greco-Roman Olympic Team Trials
  - 187.25 lb West Regional Champion
  - 187.25 lb – 3rd place
- US Greco-Roman World Team Trials
  - 211.75 lb – 4th place (2002)
- Dave Schultz Memorial International Greco-Roman
  - 187.25 lb – 1st place (2000)
  - 213.75 lb – 1st place (2001)
- University National Freestyle Championships
  - 187.25 lb – 5th place out of University of Oregon (1998)
  - 187.25 lb – 3rd place out of University of Oregon (1999)
  - 187.25 lb – 2nd place out of University of Oregon (2000)
- Championship Belt Series Winner, University Level (2000)

=== Mixed martial arts ===
- Ultimate Fighting Championship
  - UFC Hall of Fame (Fight wing, Class of 2024) vs. Anderson Silva 1 at UFC 117
  - Fight of the Night (Two times) vs. Nate Marquardt and Anderson Silva 1
  - Submission of the Night (One time) vs. Maurício Rua
  - Most control time in UFC Middleweight division history (1:31:28)
  - Highest control time percentage in UFC Middleweight division history (74.4%)
  - Most top position time in UFC Middleweight division history (1:23:23)
  - Highest top position percentage in UFC Middleweight division history (67.8%)
  - Highest significant strike percentage in UFC Middleweight division history (67.7%)
  - Fewest strikes absorbed-per-minute in UFC Middleweight division history (1.12)
  - Fifth most takedowns landed in UFC Middleweight division history (35)
  - Sixth highest takedown percentage in UFC Middleweight division history (56.5%)
  - Most total strikes landed in a UFC Middleweight division fight (320) (vs Anderson Silva 1)
  - Most total ground strikes landed in a UFC Middleweight division fight (303) (vs Anderson Silva 1)
  - UFC.com Awards
    - 2010: Fight of the Year vs. Anderson Silva 1 & ranked No. 9 Upset of the Year vs. Nate Marquardt
    - 2012: ranked No. 8 Fight of the Year vs. Anderson Silva 2
- Bellator MMA
  - Bellator Heavyweight Grand Prix Semifinalist
- DangerZone
  - DangerZone Light Heavyweight Championship (One time)
  - DangerZone Light Heavyweight Tournament Winner
- George Tragos/Lou Thesz Professional Wrestling Hall of Fame
  - George Tragos Award (2016)
- Gladiator Challenge
  - Gladiator Challenge Light Heavyweight Championship (One time)
- Hitman Fighting Productions
  - Hitman Light Heavyweight Championship (One time)
- World MMA Awards
  - 2010 Fight of the Year vs. Anderson Silva at UFC 117
  - 2013 Personality of the Year
- Wrestling Observer Newsletter awards
  - Best on Interviews (2010)
- Bloody Elbow
  - 2010 Fight of the Year vs. Anderson Silva at UFC 117

== Personal life ==
Sonnen is of German heritage, and is a Catholic. When Sonnen was 25, his father passed away from a rapid colon cancer.

Sonnen is married to Brittany; their wedding was in July 2013. The couple had their first child, a son, on June 4, 2015. On the next episode of his podcast, he said that he had never understood parents who describe something as mundane as birth as a miracle, but that now he understood. He also said, "I love hearing him scream. People get upset when their baby cries, man, I've waited a long time to hear that cry, I've got no problem with it. In my house, we understand, if you want to be heard, you gotta make a little noise." In 2016, Sonnen's newborn daughter died. Both she and Sonnen's wife, Brittany, had contracted listeria.

On May 5, 2013, Sonnen announced he would like to buy WWE (then valued at roughly $700 million) after he retires. Though his representative insisted he was not joking, a WWE representative said it was not for sale, and suggested Sonnen purchase stock in the company instead.

Sonnen has his own YouTube channel. His channel typically discusses combat sports news.

Sonnen has been open about working with a sports psychologist and believes it had a positive effect on his career. Sonnen began seeking support after first being cut from the UFC, attributing his habit of losing by submission in fights he is winning to psychological barriers. Sonnen cited this as a pivotal moment when coaching The Ultimate Fighter teammate Uriah Hall about his loss of confidence, a moment that was received positively by many in the MMA community.

== Controversies and legal troubles ==
=== 2011: Money laundering ===
Sonnen is a licensed realtor in Oregon. In 2006, as the agent for a home sale, he told the title company to pay a plumbing company owned by Sonnen's mother for repairs, though he knew they would not be carried out. After the mortgage company agreed to the loan, the plumbing company was paid $69,000 and, at Sonnen's direction, paid the home buyer $65,000. On January 3, 2011, he pleaded guilty to money laundering in connection with mortgage fraud. After agreeing to testify against others involved in the investigation, Sonnen was fined $10,000 and sentenced to two years' probation.

=== 2012: Embezzlement lawsuit ===
In 2012, Sonnen started Mean Streets Pizza with business partner Lee Gamble in West Linn, Oregon. In February 2013 Sonnen sued his business partner for embezzlement and unpaid rent. Gamble filed a counter lawsuit seeking $400,000 in damages from Sonnen for defamation, wage reimbursement, and his ownership interest in the business. The case was settled out of court and did not go to trial. Sonnen sold Mean Streets Pizza in 2014 to new management and it was renamed Island Sam's Pizza.

=== 2021: Altercation at Four Seasons Hotel Las Vegas ===
In December 2021, Sonnen was charged with five counts of misdemeanor battery after an altercation at the Four Seasons Hotel in Las Vegas, Nevada on December 18, 2021. Witnesses reported seeing Sonnen loudly banging on a hotel room door at around 7:00 PM PST. When the door opened, Sonnen allegedly got into a physical altercation with multiple people, prompting hotel guests to call 911. Video footage showed Sonnen in handcuffs being walked down a hotel hallway by Las Vegas police officers, but Sonnen was not arrested, only detained and later given citations for the charges. On January 27, 2022, all charges against Sonnen were dropped without prejudice. However, on March 22, 2022, the district attorney, who had the power to charge Sonnen again with new information, charged Sonnen with one felony battery by strangulation charge, along with 10 misdemeanor battery charges, including alleged choking of one person, possible striking of a female, among others. It was reported that Sonnen attacked a married couple "without provocation or any communication whatsoever", choking the man, striking his wife several times, elbowing another guest who tried to intervene, striking a maintenance worker, and attacking hotel security. Sonnen was described as intoxicated and incoherent, though he stated he had no memory of the incident when speaking to police. The altercation took place in an area of the hotel without cameras. Sonnen initially faced five misdemeanor battery charges by five different people but the charges were dismissed at court. On March 30, 2022, Sonnen's charges were reduced to six misdemeanors. The trial was set for April 5, 2023, after Sonnen rejected a plea deal offered by prosecutors on four misdemeanor battery charges. Sonnen was sued separately by the maintenance worker at the hotel. In July 2023, Sonnen pleaded no contest to a misdemeanor count of breaching the peace and was fined $750. He did not appear in court and was still involved in a lawsuit arising from the altercation.

== Film and television appearances ==
Sonnen has appeared in the following films:

- Here Comes the Boom (2012)
- Grudge Match (2013)

In 2017, he appeared on The New Celebrity Apprentice, the 8th season of reality game show The Celebrity Apprentice. He was fired by host Arnold Schwarzenegger in the show's 4th week after it emerged that Sonnen had deliberately cut his team's computer cord in order to gain them more time.

== Mixed martial arts record ==
Professional record breakdown
49 matches	31 wins	17 losses
By knockout	8	7
By submission	4	9
By decision	19	1
Draws	1	

Res.	Record	Opponent	Method	Event	Date	Round	Time	Location	Notes
Loss	31–17–1	Lyoto Machida	TKO (flying knee and punches)	Bellator 222	June 14, 2019	2	0:22	New York City, New York, United States	Return to Light Heavyweight. Sonnen announced his retirement post-bout.
Loss	31–16–1	Fedor Emelianenko	TKO (punches)	Bellator 208	October 13, 2018	1	4:46	Uniondale, New York, United States	Bellator Heavyweight World Grand Prix Semifinal.
Win	31–15–1	Quinton Jackson	Decision (unanimous)	Bellator 192	January 20, 2018	3	5:00	Inglewood, California, United States	Heavyweight debut. Bellator Heavyweight World Grand Prix Quarterfinal.
Win	30–15–1	Wanderlei Silva	Decision (unanimous)	Bellator 180	June 24, 2017	3	5:00	New York City, New York, United States	
Loss	29–15–1	Tito Ortiz	Submission (rear-naked choke)	Bellator 170	January 21, 2017	1	2:03	Inglewood, California, United States	
Loss	29–14–1	Rashad Evans	TKO (punches)	UFC 167	November 16, 2013	1	4:05	Las Vegas, Nevada, United States	
Win	29–13–1	Maurício Rua	Submission (guillotine choke)	UFC Fight Night: Shogun vs. Sonnen	August 17, 2013	1	4:47	Boston, Massachusetts, United States	Submission of the Night.
Loss	28–13–1	Jon Jones	TKO (elbows and punches)	UFC 159	April 27, 2013	1	4:33	Newark, New Jersey, United States	Return to Light Heavyweight. For the UFC Light Heavyweight Championship.
Loss	28–12–1	Anderson Silva	TKO (knee to the body and punches)	UFC 148	July 7, 2012	2	1:55	Las Vegas, Nevada, United States	For the UFC Middleweight Championship.
Win	28–11–1	Michael Bisping	Decision (unanimous)	UFC on Fox: Evans vs. Davis	January 28, 2012	3	5:00	Chicago, Illinois, United States	UFC Middleweight title eliminator.
Win	27–11–1	Brian Stann	Submission (arm-triangle choke)	UFC 136	October 8, 2011	2	3:51	Houston, Texas, United States	
Loss	26–11–1	Anderson Silva	Submission (triangle armbar)	UFC 117	August 7, 2010	5	3:10	Oakland, California, United States	For the UFC Middleweight Championship. Fight of the Night. Fight of the Year (2010). Sonnen tested positive for elevated testosterone levels.
Win	26–10–1	Nate Marquardt	Decision (unanimous)	UFC 109	February 6, 2010	3	5:00	Las Vegas, Nevada, United States	UFC Middleweight title eliminator. Fight of the Night.
Win	25–10–1	Yushin Okami	Decision (unanimous)	UFC 104	October 24, 2009	3	5:00	Los Angeles, California, United States	
Win	24–10–1	Dan Miller	Decision (unanimous)	UFC 98	May 23, 2009	3	5:00	Las Vegas, Nevada, United States	
Loss	23–10–1	Demian Maia	Submission (triangle choke)	UFC 95	February 21, 2009	1	2:37	London, United Kingdom	
Win	23–9–1	Paulo Filho	Decision (unanimous)	WEC 36	November 5, 2008	3	5:00	Hollywood, Florida, United States	Originally for the WEC Middleweight Championship; changed to a non-title bout when Filho missed weight (192 lb).
Win	22–9–1	Bryan Baker	Decision (unanimous)	WEC 33	March 26, 2008	3	5:00	Las Vegas, Nevada, United States	
Loss	21–9–1	Paulo Filho	Submission (armbar)	WEC 31	December 12, 2007	2	4:55	Las Vegas, Nevada, United States	For the WEC Middleweight Championship.
Win	21–8–1	Kyacey Uscola	TKO (punches)	SF 20: Homecoming	October 27, 2007	1	4:31	Portland, Oregon, United States	
Win	20–8–1	Amar Suloev	TKO (punches)	BodogFIGHT: Alvarez vs. Lee	July 14, 2007	2	3:33	Trenton, New Jersey, United States	
Win	19–8–1	Tim McKenzie	Submission (brabo choke)	BodogFIGHT: Costa Rica Combat	February 18, 2007	1	0:13	San José, Costa Rica	
Win	18–8–1	Aleksei Oleinik	Decision (unanimous)	BodogFIGHT: USA vs. Russia	December 2, 2006	3	5:00	Vancouver, British Columbia, Canada	
Win	17–8–1	Tim Credeur	TKO (punches)	BodogFIGHT: To the Brink of War	August 22, 2006	1	2:18	San José, Costa Rica	
Loss	16–8–1	Jeremy Horn	Submission (armbar)	UFC 60	May 27, 2006	2	1:17	Los Angeles, California, United States	
Win	16–7–1	Trevor Prangley	Decision (unanimous)	UFC Fight Night 4	April 6, 2006	3	5:00	Las Vegas, Nevada, United States	
Loss	15–7–1	Renato Sobral	Submission (triangle choke)	UFC 55	October 7, 2005	2	1:20	Uncasville, Connecticut, United States	Light Heavyweight bout.
Win	15–6–1	Tim Williams	TKO (punches)	SF 11: Rumble at the Rose Garden	July 9, 2005	1	3:59	Portland, Oregon, United States	
Win	14–6–1	Adam Ryan	TKO (punches)	Euphoria: USA vs World	February 26, 2005	1	3:49	Atlantic City, New Jersey, United States	
Loss	13–6–1	Terry Martin	TKO (corner stoppage)	XFO 4: International	December 3, 2004	2	5:00	McHenry, Illinois, United States	
Win	13–5–1	Alex Stiebling	Decision (unanimous)	WEC 12	October 21, 2004	3	5:00	Lemoore, California, United States	
Loss	12–5–1	Jeremy Horn	Submission (guillotine choke)	SF 6: Battleground in Reno	September 23, 2004	2	2:35	Reno, Nevada, United States	
Loss	12–4–1	Keiichiro Yamamiya	Decision (majority)	Pancrase: 2004 Neo-Blood Tournament Final	July 25, 2004	3	5:00	Tokyo, Japan	
Loss	12–3–1	Jeremy Horn	TKO (cut)	Extreme Challenge 57	May 6, 2004	1	3:34	Council Bluffs, Iowa, United States	
Win	12–2–1	Justin Bailey	KO (flying knee)	Rage on the River	April 17, 2004	1	0:40	Redding, California, United States	
Win	11–2–1	Arman Gambaryan	Decision (unanimous)	Euphoria: Russia vs USA	March 13, 2004	3	5:00	Atlantic City, New Jersey, United States	Middleweight debut.
Win	10–2–1	Homer Moore	Decision (unanimous)	ROTR 4.5: Proving Grounds	December 27, 2003	2	5:00	Hilo, Hawaii, United States	
Win	9–2–1	Greg Curnut	TKO (submission to punches)	FCFF: Rumble at the Roseland 10	December 13, 2003	1	1:07	Portland, Oregon, United States	
Win	8–2–1	Jason Lambert	Decision (unanimous)	Gladiator Challenge 20	November 13, 2003	3	5:00	Colusa, California, United States	Won the Gladiator Challenge Light Heavyweight Championship.
Loss	7–2–1	Forrest Griffin	Submission (triangle choke)	IFC: Global Domination	September 6, 2003	1	2:25	Denver, Colorado, United States	
Win	7–1–1	Renato Sobral	Decision	Hitman Fighting 3	May 2, 2003	N/A	N/A	Santa Ana, California, United States	
Draw	6–1–1	Akihiro Gono	Draw	Pancrase: Hybrid 2	February 16, 2003	2	5:00	Osaka, Japan	
Loss	6–1	Trevor Prangley	Technical Submission (armbar)	XFA 5: Redemption	January 25, 2003	1	2:49	West Palm Beach, Florida, United States	
Win	6–0	Justin Hawes	TKO (punches)	UFCF: Rumble in Rochester	August 24, 2002	2	4:26	Rochester, Washington, United States	
Win	5–0	Jesse Ault	Decision (unanimous)	Real Fighting Championships 1: The Beginning	July 13, 2002	3	5:00	Las Vegas, Nevada, United States	
Win	4–0	Scott Shipman	Submission (forearm choke)	Dangerzone 13: Caged Heat	April 13, 2002	2	2:08	New Town, North Dakota, United States	Won the Dangerzone Light Heavyweight Tournament and the Dangerzone Light Heavyweight Championship.
Win	3–0	Jesse Ault	Decision (unanimous)	Dangerzone 13: Caged Heat	April 13, 2002	2	5:00	New Town, North Dakota, United States	Dangerzone Light Heavyweight Tournament Semifinal.
Win	2–0	Jason Miller	Decision (unanimous)	HFP 1: Rumble on The Reservation	March 30, 2002	2	5:00	Anza, California, United States	
Win	1–0	Ben Hailey	Decision (unanimous)	Battle of Fort Vancouver	May 10, 1997	1	7:00	Vancouver, Washington, United States	

== Submission grappling record ==
10 Matches, 3 Wins, 5 Losses, 2 Draws
Result	Rec.	Opponent	Method	Event	Date	Division	Location
Loss	3–5–2	(Australia) Craig Jones	Submission (buggy choke)	CJI 2	August 31, 2025	Superfight	(United States) Las Vegas, Nevada
Loss	3–4–2	(Australia) Craig Jones	Submission (heel hook)	ADCC 2017	September 24, 2017	Absolute	Espoo, Finland
Win	3–3–2	(Brazil) Léo Vieira	Referee Decision	ADCC 2017	September 24, 2017	Superfight	Espoo, Finland
Draw	2–3–2	(United Kingdom) Michael Bisping	Draw	UR Fight 2016	March 20, 2016	Superfight	(United States) Phoenix, Arizona
Draw	2–3–1	(Brazil) Renato Sobral	Draw	Metamoris VI	May 9, 2015	Superfight	(United States) Los Angeles, California
Loss	2–3	(Brazil) André Galvão	Submission (rear-naked choke)	Metamoris IV	August 9, 2014	Superfight	(United States) Los Angeles, California
Loss	2–2	(Brazil) Alexandre Ferreira	N/A	ADCC 2003	May 17, 2003	-99 kg	São Paulo, Brazil
Win	2–1	(United States) Beau Clark	N/A	ADCC 2003	May 17, 2003	-99 kg	São Paulo, Brazil
Loss	1–1	(Brazil) Alexandre Ferreira	Submission (guillotine choke)	ADCC 2001	April 11, 2001	-99 kg	Abu Dhabi, United Arab Emirates
Win	1–0	(Canada) Stephan Potvin	N/A	ADCC 2001	April 11, 2001	-99 kg	Abu Dhabi, United Arab Emirates

== Exhibition boxing record ==
1 fight	0 wins	0 losses
Draws	1	

No.	Result	Record	Opponent	Type	Round, time	Date	Location	Notes
1	Draw	0–0–1	Anderson Silva	—N/a	5	Jun 15, 2024	São Paulo, Brazil	

== Pay-per-view bouts ==
No.	Event	Fight	Date	Venue	City	PPV Buys
1.	UFC 109	Sonnen vs. Marquardt (co)	February 6, 2010	Mandalay Bay Events Center	Las Vegas, Nevada, U.S.	285,000
2.	UFC 117	Silva vs. Sonnen	August 7, 2010	Oracle Arena	Oakland, California, U.S.	600,000
3.	UFC 148	Silva vs. Sonnen 2	July 7, 2012	MGM Grand Garden Arena	Las Vegas, Nevada, U.S.	925,000
4.	UFC 159	Jones vs. Sonnen	April 27, 2013	Prudential Center	Newark, New Jersey, U.S.	530,000
5.	UFC 167	Evans vs. Sonnen (co)	November 16, 2013	MGM Grand Garden Arena	Las Vegas, Nevada, U.S.	630,000
6.	Bellator 180	Sonnen vs. Silva	June 24, 2017	Madison Square Garden	New York City, New York, U.S.	95,000
Total sales						3,065,000

== See also ==
- List of male mixed martial artists
- List of sportspeople sanctioned for doping offences
