= Black House (MMA) =

MMA training facility in Brazil

Black House (Casa Preta)
- Est.: 2006
- Founded by: Ed Soares; Carlos Barreto; Jorge Guimarães; Rogério Camões
- Primary trainers: Rogério Camões; Sylvio Behring
- Current titleholders: Barb Honchak Flyweight Champion (Invicta FC 2013-Present) 125 lb (57 kg; 8.9 st)
- Past titleholders: Anderson Silva Middleweight Champion (UFC 2006-2013) 185 lb (84 kg; 13.2 st); Antônio Rodrigo Nogueira Interim Heavyweight Champion (UFC 2008) 240 lb (110 kg; 17 st), Heavyweight Champion (Pride 2001-2004) 210 lb (95 kg; 15 st); Rafael Cavalcante Light Heavyweight Champion (Strikeforce 2010-2011) 205 lb (93 kg; 14.6 st); Lyoto Machida Light Heavyweight Champion (UFC 2009-2010) 205 lb (93 kg; 14.6 st); Ronaldo Souza Middleweight Champion (Strikeforce 2010-2011) 185 lb (84 kg; 13.2 st)
- Training facilities: Rio de Janeiro, Brazil; Los Angeles, California
- Website: http://www.blackhousemma.com/

Black House (Casa Preta) is a mixed martial arts fighting team and gym based out of Brazil. Opened on November 27, 2006, Black House was started by former Brazilian Top Team member and black belt Carlos Barreto, Jorge Guimarães and Rogério Camões. Guimarães acted as the team's manager and Camões was in charge of the team's training.

Fighters on the team include Anderson Silva, Lyoto Machida, Antônio Rogério Nogueira, Antônio Rodrigo Nogueira, Pedro Rizzo, Erick Silva, Rafael Cavalcante and former Chute Boxe Academy fighter Antonio "Nino" Schembri. The facility features an octagon, a boxing ring, and two dojos in the workout space.

== Re-branding and re-location ==
Despite the team's recent success in the UFC with the championships held by Silva, Machida and Nogueira, there had been much unrest due to non-competition related affairs. It appears that the team has moved or will be moving from their current location at X-Gym due to unresolvable disputes, and in a December 2007 interview Anderson Silva was quoted as stating that due to certain 'brand problems' the name Black House was likely to change following the move. On May 16, 2008, Silva and Antônio Rodrigo Nogueira opened the Nogueira and Silva Mixed Martial Arts Academy in Miami, Florida.

Despite these events, in a 2009 interview with Sherdog Radio host Jordan Breen, Black House manager Ed Soares indicated that Black House may open a new training location in Los Angeles, California. He also shed light on some of the issues that led many to believe that the team had disbanded, most notably the team management's falling out with the owners of X-Gym, the original location and headquarters for their training camps.

== Notable Fighters ==
- Anderson Silva (Former UFC Middleweight Champion)
- Junior dos Santos (Former UFC Heavyweight Champion)
- José Aldo (Former UFC Featherweight Champion)
- Rafael "Feijao" Cavalcante (Former Strikeforce Light Heavyweight Champion)
- Antônio Rodrigo Nogueira (Former Pride FC heavyweight champion and former UFC Interim Heavyweight Champion)
- Lyoto Machida (Former UFC Light Heavyweight Champion)
- Antônio Rogério Nogueira (2006 and 2007 Brazilian Super Heavyweight Boxing Champion and 2007 Pan American Games bronze medalist)
- Mario Miranda (former M-1 Middleweight Champion)
- Ronaldo "Jacaré" Souza (Former Strikeforce Middleweight Champion)
- Pedro Rizzo (former World Vale Tudo Championship (WVC) heavyweight champion)
- Andre Galvao (multiple time World Jiu-Jitsu Champion and Pan American Champion)
- Thales Leites (Current Superior Challenge middleweight champion)
- Satoshi Ishii (Olympic Gold Medalist in Judo)
- Carlos Eduardo Rocha (Free Fight Alliance Middleweight Champion and La Onda Manto Cup Champion)
- Roger Gracie (multiple time ADCC Gold Medalist and World Jiu-Jitsu Champion)
- Rafael dos Anjos (former UFC Lightweight Champion, Former Fury FC Lightweight Championship)
- Glover Teixeira (former member of the Brazilian National Wrestling Team)
- Alexander Volkov (Former Bellator Heavyweight Champion)
- Andrey Koreshkov (Bellator season 7 welterweight tournament winner)
- Patricio Freire (Former Bellator Featherweight Champion)
- Jordan Smith
- Fabricio Camoes
- Diego Nunes
- Erick Silva
- Shanon Slack
- Justin Lawrence
- Johnny Eduardo
- Luis Ramos
- Kevin Casey (Former RFA Middleweight Champion) (Ultimate Fighter 17 Contestant)
- Tiffany van Soest
- William Macario
- Uriah Hall
- Kelvin Gastelum (The Ultimate Fighter 17 Winner)
- Barb Honchak (Invicta FC Flyweight Champion)
- Cat Zingano
- Justine Kish (The Ultimate Fighter 20 Contestant)
- Brian Ortega (Former RTC and RFA Featherweight Champions)
- Sheymon Moraes
- Patricky Freire
- Geane Herrera
- Gabi Garcia
- Travis Browne
