= Ed Soares =

American martial artist

- Born: Redondo Beach, California, United States
- Occupations: MMA Manager, founder of LFA

Ed Soares is an American of Brazilian descent born in Redondo Beach, California to Brazilian parents. He is known for being the manager of a number of Brazilian Mixed martial arts fighters, including Anderson Silva, Antônio Rodrigo Nogueira, Patricio Freire, and Lyoto Machida. He is the founder of Legacy Fighting Alliance.

== Career ==
He is the former owner of the clothing company Sinister Brand, and is a business manager for approximately 20 MMA fighters, including former UFC Light Heavyweight Champion Lyoto Machida, former UFC Middleweight Champion Anderson Silva, former UFC Featherweight Champion José Aldo, former WEC Middleweight Champion Paulo Filho, former UFC Heavyweight title-contender Pedro Rizzo, former UFC Interim Heavyweight Champion Antônio Rodrigo Nogueira, his twin brother UFC Light-Heavyweight Antônio Rogério Nogueira, and former Strikeforce Light Heavyweight Champion Rafael Cavalcante. He also often serves as a translator for his fighters in post-fight interviews.

Heavyweight fighter Junior dos Santos was a longtime client of Ed Soares, but announced on his website and Facebook page that he was no longer under his management in June 2011, shortly before he won the UFC Heavyweight Title.

Additionally, Soares is co-founder of the Black House MMA fighting team, where many of his fighters train. As he is the manager for several of the highest profile fighters in mixed martial arts, he is currently considered one of the most influential managers in the sport.
