= UFC 178 =

UFC mixed martial arts event in 2014

UFC 178: Johnson vs. Cariaso
- The poster for UFC 178: Johnson vs. Cariaso
- Promotion: Ultimate Fighting Championship
- Date: September 27, 2014
- Venue: MGM Grand Garden Arena
- City: Las Vegas, Nevada
- Attendance: 14,544
- Total gate: $2.2 million
- Buyrate: 205,000

Event chronology
UFC Fight Night: Hunt vs. Nelson	UFC 178: Johnson vs. Cariaso	UFC Fight Night: Nelson vs. Story

UFC 178: Johnson vs. Cariaso was a mixed martial arts event held on September 27, 2014, at the MGM Grand Garden Arena in Las Vegas, Nevada.

== Background ==
The event was supposed to be headlined by a UFC Light Heavyweight Championship rematch between champion Jon Jones and Alexander Gustafsson. Jones won their first fight at UFC 165 by unanimous decision. Gustafsson pulled out of the bout due to a torn right meniscus and lateral collateral ligament. He was replaced by Daniel Cormier on July 23. However, on August 12, Jones was forced to pull out of the bout against Cormier citing a leg injury. The fight was rescheduled to take place at UFC 182. As a result, a Flyweight Title fight between Demetrious Johnson and Chris Cariaso was moved from UFC 177 to headline this card.

The event marked the return of former bantamweight champion Dominick Cruz, after nearly three years on the sideline, first with a coaching assignment on The Ultimate Fighter 15, then with various lengthy injury rehabilitations. He was matched up against Takeya Mizugaki.

A lightweight bout between Donald Cerrone and Khabib Nurmagomedov was briefly linked to this event. However, the pairing was cancelled after Nurmagomedov suffered a knee injury that sidelined him indefinitely.

Jorge Masvidal and Bobby Green were originally scheduled to face each other on this card. However, on August 14, the UFC announced that Green would now face Donald Cerrone and Masvidal would face James Krause.

On August 19, following his release from Bellator MMA, Eddie Alvarez signed with the UFC and made his debut against Donald Cerrone in the co-main event for the card. Bobby Green, Cerrone's earlier opponent, was booked for a future fight card against a new opponent.

== Results ==
Main card
Weight class				Method	Round	Time	Notes
Flyweight	Demetrious Johnson (c)	def.	Chris Cariaso	Submission (kimura)	2	2:29	(Note: For the UFC Flyweight Championship.)
Lightweight	Donald Cerrone	def.	Eddie Alvarez	Decision (unanimous) (29–28, 29–28, 29–28)	3	5:00
Featherweight	Conor McGregor	def.	Dustin Poirier	TKO (punches)	1	1:46
Middleweight	Yoel Romero	def.	Tim Kennedy	TKO (punches)	3	0:58
Women's Bantamweight	Cat Zingano	def.	Amanda Nunes	TKO (elbows and punches)	3	1:21
Preliminary card (Fox Sports 1)
Bantamweight	Dominick Cruz	def.	Takeya Mizugaki	KO (punches)	1	1:01	(Note: This bout aired on the broadcast following the Johnson vs Cariaso bout.)
Lightweight	Jorge Masvidal	def.	James Krause	Decision (unanimous) (30–27, 29–28, 30–27)	3	5:00
Welterweight	Stephen Thompson	def.	Patrick Côté	Decision (unanimous) (29–28, 29–28, 30–27)	3	5:00
Welterweight	Brian Ebersole	def.	John Howard	Decision (split) (29–28, 28–29, 29–28)	3	5:00
Preliminary card (UFC Fight Pass)
Lightweight	Kevin Lee	def.	Jon Tuck	Decision (unanimous) (30–26, 30–26, 30–26)	3	5:00	(Note: Tuck was docked one point for a groin kick in round 2.)
Bantamweight	Manny Gamburyan	def.	Cody Gibson	Submission (guillotine choke)	2	4:56

== Bonus awards ==
The following fighters received $50,000 bonuses:

- Fight of the Night: Yoel Romero vs. Tim Kennedy
- Performance of the Night: Dominick Cruz and Conor McGregor

== Reported payout ==
The following is the reported payout to the fighters as reported to the Nevada State Athletic Commission. It does not include sponsor money and also does not include the UFC's traditional "fight night" bonuses.

- Demetrious Johnson: $183,000 (includes $54,000 win bonus) def. Chris Cariaso: $24,000
- Donald Cerrone: $126,000 (includes $63,000 win bonus) def. Eddie Alvarez: $100,000
- Conor McGregor: $150,000 (includes $75,000 win bonus) def. Dustin Poirier: $34,000
- Yoel Romero: $58,000 (includes $29,000 win bonus) def. Tim Kennedy: $70,000
- Cat Zingano: $18,000 (includes $9,000 win bonus) def. Amanda Nunes: $15,000
- Dominick Cruz: $100,000 (includes $50,000 win bonus) def. Takeya Mizugaki: $32,000
- Jorge Masvidal: $90,000 (includes $45,000 win bonus) def. James Krause: $15,000
- Stephen Thompson: $32,000 (includes $16,000 win bonus) def. Patrick Côté: $33,000
- Brian Ebersole: $42,000 (includes $21,000 win bonus) def. John Howard: $21,000
- Kevin Lee: $20,000 (includes $10,000 win bonus) def. Jon Tuck: $10,000
- Manvel Gamburyan: $50,000 (includes $25,000 win bonus) def. Cody Gibson: $10,000

== See also ==
- List of UFC events
- 2014 in UFC
