= Alexander Gustafsson =

Swedish mixed martial artist (born 1987)

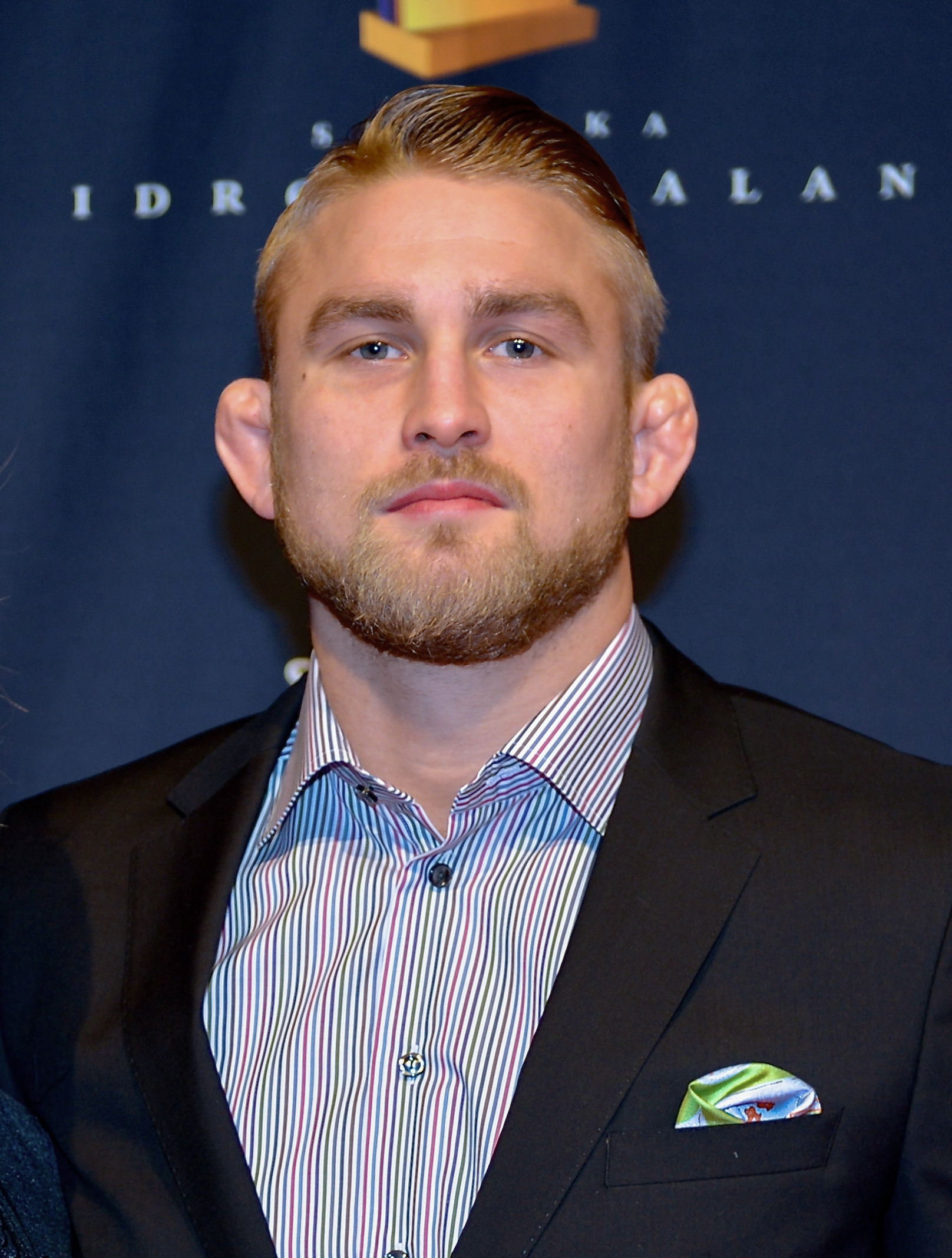
- Gustafsson at the Swedish Sports Awards in 2014
- Born: Alexander Lars-Åke Gustafsson; 15 January 1987 (age 39); Arboga, Sweden
- Nickname: The Mauler
- Height: 6 ft 5 in (196 cm)
- Weight: 205 lb (93 kg; 14 st 9 lb)
- Division: Light Heavyweight (2007–2019, 2021–present); Heavyweight (2020–present)
- Reach: 79 in (201 cm)
- Fighting out of: Stockholm, Sweden
- Team: Allstars Training Center; Alliance MMA
- Rank: Purple belt in Brazilian Jiu-Jitsu
- Years active: 2007–present (MMA)

Mixed martial arts record
- Total: 26
- Wins: 18
- By knockout: 11
- By submission: 3
- By decision: 4
- Losses: 8
- By knockout: 3
- By submission: 3
- By decision: 2

Other information
- Mixed martial arts record from Sherdog

Alexander Lars-Åke Gustafsson (born 15 January 1987) is a Swedish professional mixed martial artist. He competed in the Light Heavyweight division in the Ultimate Fighting Championship (UFC).

Gustafsson spent a major part of his MMA career in the Light Heavyweight division of the UFC, where he became a top contender and fought for the title three times. He is often regarded as one of the best mixed martial artists never to have won a UFC Championship.

== Mixed martial arts career ==
=== Early career ===
Gustafsson started training MMA in 2006, and before that, he trained in boxing, which he started when he was around 10 years old. He won the national championship (youth-junior level) in 2003, at the age of 16. In 2008–2009 he made a quick return to boxing, winning some amateur tournaments in Sweden and defeating the Swedish heavyweight boxing champion in an amateur fight. He was set to compete in the national championship event the following year, 2010, for which he was a big favorite to win. However, his newly awakened boxing career ended when he signed with the UFC in September 2009.

Gustafsson also competed in the martial arts form of shootfighting, before starting his professional MMA career, with a Shoot record of 5–1, with 4 wins by KO/TKO and 1 by decision, his only loss came by split decision against Mats Nilsson in the Kaisho Battle 2007 event. Before signing with the UFC, Gustafsson fought mostly in smaller promotions in Sweden and other parts of Europe. By 2009, he had racked up a perfect pro-record of 8–0, with 6 wins coming by the way of KO/TKO, 1 by submission and 1 by decision.

The most notable victories in his first 8 fights came against German prospect Florian Muller, who he defeated by TKO in the second round on 13 March 2008.

Later that year, after another TKO victory against Matteo Minonzio, he replaced his former opponent Florian Muller on less than 24 hours notice against Krzysztof Kulak, who at the time was a top prospect in Poland, on 13 September 2008, at KSW Extra. He won the fight knocking Kulak down several times, earning the unanimous decision victory.

In his last fight before he was signed to the UFC, Gustafsson fought European veteran Vladimir Shemarov on 30 May 2009 at Superior Challenge 3. He won the fight by knockout in the first round.

Gustafsson received his purple belt in Brazilian Jiu Jitsu 2019.

=== Ultimate Fighting Championship ===
Gustafsson made his UFC debut against Jared Hamman on 14 November 2009, at UFC 105. Gustafsson dropped Hamman with a straight right punch and won the fight via KO at 0:41 in the first round.

Gustafsson's next fight was against Phil Davis on 10 April 2010, at UFC 112. Gustafsson lost the fight via submission due to an anaconda choke. Prior to this, Gustafsson showed good wrestling and takedown defense which Joe Rogan praised him for. After being softened up by brutal elbows, Gustafsson was sprawled by Davis and was forced to tap out at 4:55 of the first round.

Gustafsson faced MMA and kickboxing veteran Cyrille Diabaté at UFC 120. In advance of this bout, Gustafsson traveled to San Diego, California, to train with Alliance MMA for a month. At the training camp, Gustafsson trained with notable UFC fighters like his former opponent Phil Davis, Dominick Cruz, Brandon Vera, Joey Beltran and Travis Browne. He also took grappling tips from Davis and worked to improve his strength and speed. After dominating the first round in stand up as well as on the ground, dropping Diabate twice, Gustafsson defeated Diabate via submission (rear-naked choke) in the second round. In post-fight interviews Gustafsson said that the main reason for his success against Diabate was the time that he spent at Alliance MMA in the training camp.

Gustafsson won his second straight UFC fight on 27 February 2011, at UFC 127 where he defeated James Te-Huna in the first round by submission due to a rear-naked choke.

Gustafsson was expected to face Vladimir Matyushenko on 6 August 2011, at UFC 133. But Matyushenko pulled out of the fight due to injury and was replaced by Matt Hamill. In the 2nd round, Gustafsson dropped Hamill with a straight punch followed by two uppercuts, finishing Hamill by TKO, with punches and elbows from the mount. Hamill announced his retirement shortly after the fight.

Gustafsson eventually faced Matyushenko on 30 December 2011, at UFC 141. He defeated Matyushenko by TKO in the first round after dropping him with a jab and finishing with punches on the ground. After the win UFC President Dana White said that a first round finish of Matyushenko, who he referred to as a gatekeeper at the time, made it clear that Gustafsson was a force to be reckoned with and that he would get a step up in competition for his next fight.

Gustafsson was expected to face Antônio Rogério Nogueira on 14 April 2012, at UFC on Fuel TV 2 in Stockholm, Sweden, but Nogueira pulled out of the fight due to an injury and was replaced by Thiago Silva. Gustafsson was able to effectively use his reach and jab to largely outstrike Silva, scoring points by knocking him down early in the first round as well as scoring a takedown in the second. His dominant performance earned him the unanimous decision (30–27, 30–27, and 29–28) victory. Just like after his previous win, it was again clear that Gustafsson was in need of another step up in competition, and UFC President Dana White said that his next fight would be against someone in the top of the rankings.

Gustafsson faced Maurício Rua on 8 December 2012, at UFC on Fox 5. He was able to use his reach and powerful striking, as well as his wrestling, from which he was able to land six takedowns, to defeat Rua via unanimous decision (30–27, 30–27, and 30–26). It was said that a victory over 'Shogun' Rua would likely ensure Gustafsson of a shot at the title in his next fight, but since he didn't want to sit out of competition for a long time to wait for his chance, Gustafsson said he was fine with having another fight before that could happen.

Gustafsson was expected to face former Strikeforce Light Heavyweight Champion Gegard Mousasi on 6 April 2013, at UFC on Fuel TV 9 and it was said that a victory would ensure him of a shot at the title. However, on 30 March it was revealed that Gustafsson had suffered a cut during a sparring session. On 2 April it was announced by Swedish MMA Federation that he was not cleared to compete. Gustafsson was replaced by UFC newcomer Ilir Latifi, one of his main training partners.

==== Title shot ====
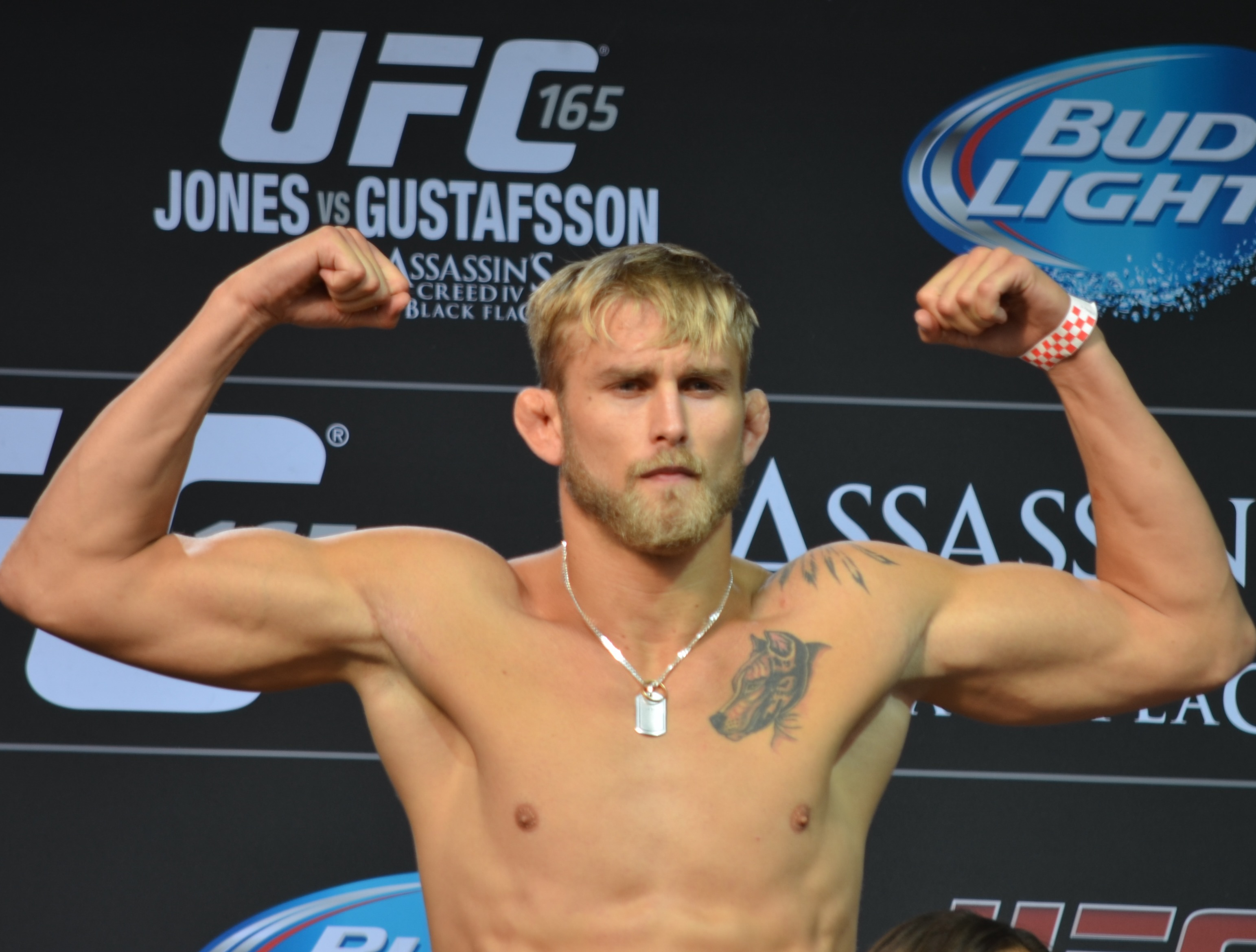
Gustafsson at the weigh-ins for the UFC 165 event

Gustafsson earned a title shot and faced UFC Light Heavyweight Champion Jon Jones on 21 September 2013 in the main event at UFC 165. Despite being looked at as a big underdog coming into this fight, Gustafsson challenged Jones unlike any previous contender, taking the champion down for the first time in his career, picking him apart on the feet and cutting Jones badly above the right eye early in the fight. Jones later rallied, and dominated the final rounds and in the end out landed Gustafsson in strikes, 137–114. Gustafsson ultimately lost via unanimous decision. After the fight, before being sent to hospital, Jones said Gustafsson had given him the hardest fight of his career. Gustafsson and Jones were awarded the "Fight of the Night" bonus award for their performances. The fight was critically acclaimed by mixed martial arts media outlets and fighters, with many considering it to be the greatest light heavyweight title fight of all time. The fight was later named 2013 Fight of the Year by World MMA Awards along with various other major MMA media outlets, Gustafsson also won the prize for 2013 International Fighter of the Year. On 8 March 2020, it was announced that the fight will be inducted to UFC Hall of Fame's Fight Wing on 9 July.

I learned a lot after that fight about myself. Even if I lost that fight, I still went from basically a no one to someone to people are talking about me. It was a big turnaround in my career for sure.

— Gustafsson about his title challenge after the Hall of Fame induction

It was indicated by Dana White that he was interested in an immediate Jones vs. Gustafsson rematch, without confirming anything. Gustafsson ended up not getting the rematch after it was confirmed that Jones would be defending his belt next against Glover Teixeira. It was said that the next opponent for Gustafsson was not confirmed yet, but that the fight would take place in Sweden or England in early 2014. It was also said that Gustafsson, if victorious in his next fight, would get another shot at the title. When asked about all this, Gustafsson said that his main goal was to get another shot at the title and that he's happy to fight anybody to get there, he also said that as long as Jon Jones still is the champion, he will be the main target.

==== Post title fight ====
At a post-fight press conference in Manchester, Dana White said that Gustafsson would be facing Antônio Rogério Nogueira on 8 March 2014, at UFC Fight Night 37. He also stated that if both he and Jones won their next bouts, then the rematch would be set for the title. However, just 5 days after the fight was announced news came that Nogueira had to withdraw from the bout due to an injury. Later, reports came that said that Nogueira had never agreed to take the fight against Gustafsson at all. Instead, he faced undefeated striker Jimi Manuwa at the same event. He won the fight by TKO after dropping Manuwa with a knee followed by a flurry of punches in the clinch, in the second round, handing Manuwa the first loss of his career. His performance earned him both Fight of the Night and Performance of the Night awards.

On 27 April 2014, UFC President Dana White confirmed that a rematch with the champion Jon Jones would be next for Gustafsson, and stated the possibility of the match taking place in a stadium in Sweden on pay-per-view. On 24 May 2014, it was indicated that the rematch would take place in Las Vegas on 30 August 2014, at UFC 177. The statement, and the time and venue, wasn't official however, since Gustafsson was the only one who still had agreed to take the fight. On 2 June, the fight was still on hold, and UFC President Dana White explained the situation as: "Jones doesn't want to fight Gustafsson".

On 5 June 2014, the UFC confirmed that the Jones/Gustafsson rematch would take place on 27 September 2014, at UFC 178. At first, the fight was expected to take place in Toronto, but the venue was later changed to Las Vegas. However, Gustafsson was forced to pull out of the bout due to a torn meniscus and was replaced by fellow top contender Daniel Cormier.

At first, a fight against Anthony Johnson was reported to be in the makings, but the bout would later be scratched by the UFC.

Gustafsson was briefly linked to a potential bout with Rashad Evans on 24 January 2015, at UFC on Fox 14. Subsequently, Evans announced he would not be ready during that time line as he was still rehabilitating a knee injury. Gustafsson instead faced Anthony Johnson at the event with the winner guaranteed a title shot against Jon Jones. Gustafsson lost the fight via TKO in the first round, marking the first time in his career that he had been stopped due to strikes.

Gustafsson was expected to face Teixeira on 20 June 2015, at UFC Fight Night 69. However, it was announced that Gustafsson had been removed from the card due to an injury in his back.

In June 2015, news then came that Gustafsson was about to be booked against Daniel Cormier who recently had won the vacant title. At first, the matchup seemed to be set for 5 September 2015, at UFC 191. However, Cormier wasn't able to make it due to an injury and the fight was delayed.

The title fight against Cormier took place on 3 October 2015, at UFC 192. It was a back and forth fight that saw Gustafsson land two takedowns in round 2 and also drop Cormier by a knee and following punches in the end of round 3. He lost the fight by split decision. Their performance earned both fighters the Fight of the Night awards. In interviews after the fight, Cormier told reporters that the fight with Gustafsson had been the hardest of his career. As a result of the injuries Gustafsson sustained during the fight, a preliminary medical suspension was set for him until April.

Gustafsson next fought Jan Błachowicz on 3 September 2016, at UFC Fight Night 93. He won the fight by unanimous decision (30–27, 30–27, and 30–27).

A pairing with Antônio Rogério Nogueira was scheduled for a third time and was expected to take place on 19 November 2016, at UFC Fight Night 100. However just days after the fight was announced, Gustafsson pulled out of the bout citing an injury. In turn, he was replaced by Ryan Bader. It was later revealed that he had sustained a back injury, which would sideline him from training and competition indefinitely.

A rescheduled fight with Teixeira took place on 28 May 2017, in the main event at UFC Fight Night 109. After dominating the fight for four rounds, Gustafsson won the fight via knockout early in the fifth round. Their performance earned both fighters the Fight of the Night awards.

After some time of hiatus from competition due to a shoulder injury, Gustafsson was first targeted to face Luke Rockhold, but Rockhold would have to pull out of the fight, citing an injury. Gustafsson was instead scheduled to face Volkan Oezdemir on 4 August 2018 at UFC 227. However, on 19 July 2018 it was reported that Oezdemir was removed from the bout due to a broken nose. It was reported that on 22 July 2018, Gustafsson also pulled out from the bout due to injury. It was later revealed that Gustafsson had suffered a hamstring injury, and that the UFC was hoping for him to be back before the end of the year.

On 10 October, it was announced that Gustafsson would have a rematch with the returning Jon Jones on 29 December 2018 at UFC 232 for the vacant UFC Light Heavyweight Championship. He lost the fight via technical knockout in round three. Gustafsson suffered an injured groin during the fight, as a result of a knee from Jones.

==== Retirement ====
Gustafsson next faced Anthony Smith on 1 June 2019, in the main event at UFC Fight Night 153. He lost the fight via rear-naked choke submission in the fourth round. In his post-fight interview, Gustafsson announced his retirement from MMA by taking off his gloves, laying them on the floor of the octagon, and saying "The show is over, guys".

==== Return and move to heavyweight ====
Just a few months after Gustafsson's retirement from competition, rumors about a potential comeback were already in motion. On 7 November 2019, UFC President Dana White confirmed that Gustafsson was showing interest in returning.

On 11 December 2019, Gustafsson competed in a grappling match in Sweden, against Swedish MMA prospect Anton Turkalj. He was victorious by points.

In an interview on 3 April 2020, Gustafsson revealed that he was planning a training trip to the United States as soon as the travel restrictions due to the COVID-19 pandemic were lifted. He said that the outcome of this trip would determine if he was going to make a comeback or not.

On 5 June 2020, Gustafsson announced his return to active MMA competition in the UFC as part of the heavyweight division. Gustafsson faced former UFC heavyweight champion Fabrício Werdum on 26 July 2020, at UFC on ESPN 14. He lost the fight via an armbar submission in round one.

Gustafsson was scheduled to face Paul Craig in a light heavyweight bout on 4 September 2021, at UFC Fight Night 191. However, a week before the event, Gustafsson withdrew due to injury.

Instead, Gustafsson was scheduled to remain at heavyweight and face Ben Rothwell on 21 May 2022. However, at the end of March, it was announced that Rothwell was released from the UFC roster.

==== Return to Light Heavyweight ====
Gustafsson faced Nikita Krylov on 23 July 2022, at UFC Fight Night 208. He lost the fight via knockout early in the first round.

Gustafsson was scheduled to face Ovince Saint Preux on 10 December 2022, at UFC 282. However, Gustafsson withdrew due to undisclosed reasons and was replaced by Philipe Lins.

In a January 2024 interview, Gustafsson stated that he was training again, that he was still under contract with the UFC, and said "If I fight, it would be in the UFC."

On 12 December 2024, it was reported that Gustafsson was granted his release from the UFC.

=== Global Fight League ===
On 11 December 2024, it was announced that Gustafsson was signed by Global Fight League.

Gustafsson was scheduled to face former UFC Light Heavyweight Championship challenger Ovince Saint Preux on 25 May 2025 at GFL 2. However, all GFL events were cancelled indefinitely.

== Training and fighting style ==
Gustafsson has been training in his native Sweden for the most part of his career, mainly at Allstar Training Center in Stockholm, which is run by Gustafsson himself (as a co-owner) and his head coach Andreas Michael, who is a former boxing coach and former amateur boxing coach for the Swedish Olympic team.

Since his loss to Phil Davis at UFC 112, Gustafsson has also been training part-time with Davis and the others at Alliance MMA in San Diego, California. After his title fight against Jon Jones at UFC 165, rumors came out that Gustafsson would leave Alliance to train only in Sweden, but Gustafsson and his team later came out saying that the rumors were false and that he would still mix up his training by spending time at Alliance as well as flying people in from the United States to train with him in Sweden for his future fights.

Since then, Gustafsson has been training mainly in Sweden at Allstar Training Center, but the team has kept their close relationship with Alliance MMA in San Diego, having the two teams working together. Gustafsson and others from Allstar have travelled to train in San Diego in between fights. At numerous occasions, Alliance fighters has also travelled to Sweden to be a part of Gustafsson's training camps. Phil Davis was helping him to prepare for Teixeira in 2017. In addition to Gustafsson and his long time training partner Ilir Latifi, the Allstar team has also added other big names from the heavier divisions. Names such as Gustafsson's former opponent Jimi Manuwa (who moved there after his loss to Gustafsson) and Gökhan Saki.

Gustafsson's fighting style is primarily based on striking, drawing heavily from his boxing background. He uses footwork, movement, and reach to create openings and maintain distance from opponents while setting up combinations. Throughout his UFC career, he also developed his wrestling and grappling skill, incorporating both offensive and defensive wrestling into his overall approach.

== Personal life ==
In 2015, Gustafsson began a relationship with his present girlfriend, Moa. In 2017, the couple became engaged inside the octagon right after Gustafsson defeated Teixeira in his hometown of Stockholm, Sweden. They have a daughter and son.

He grew up in Arboga, a small town about 1 1/2 hour drive west of Stockholm, together with his mother, step-father and four younger sisters. In interviews, his mother has said that she named him after Alexander the Great. He had a close relationship with his biological father, who lived in another city and was struggling with alcohol abuse. His biological father died a few weeks prior to Gustafsson's fight in London against Jimi Manuwa on 8 March 2014. In interviews after the fight he said he wanted to dedicate the victory to him.

His nickname, "The Mauler", was given to him early in his career by training partners, referring to the powerful striking, killer instinct and aggression to finish fights.

When asked about his idols in combat sports, Gustafsson always names MMA legend Fedor Emelianenko as his biggest inspiration coming in to the sport.

Gustafsson is a Christian, and he had a close personal relationship with his pastor, Wiggo Carlsson, until his death in 2012.

He is a long time friend, and former occasional training and sparring partner, of two-division boxing world champion Badou Jack. With both being Swedish and Gustafsson coming from a boxing background, their paths crossed on the amateur boxing scene in Stockholm in 2007–2008. He has often, both before and after his title fight at UFC 165, been compared to Swedish Heavyweight boxer Ingemar Johansson who won the world title in 1959, focusing both on similarities and differences in their respective fighting styles.

Gustafsson had a troubled youth which led to him ending up in fights often as a teenager, for which he was first convicted when he was 15. As an 18-year-old in 2005, he was sentenced to prison for aggravated assault, having assaulted a brother and sister unprovoked together with two accomplices, after a night of drinking. He was released in 2006, turned his life around, got back into training, found MMA and moved to another city to leave the trouble behind him. He has said that it was getting involved in MMA that finally changed his life for the better.

Before embarking on his fight career, Gustafsson had various other jobs. He was a construction worker and also worked security as a bouncer in night clubs. He also had a license to work as a divemaster for scuba diving. It was after his fight with Phil Davis he quit his regular job to fully commit to MMA.

Gustafsson played a role in the Swedish mainstream movie Johan Falk – Blood Diamonds which premiered in 2015.

As of 2019, Gustafsson is a part owner at the Swedish mixed martial arts promotion AK Fighting Championship. In 2021, the Allstar Training Center, of which Gustafsson is a co-owner, is expanding and opening a second training location, this time in Torrevieja, Spain.

== Championships and accomplishments ==
=== Mixed martial arts ===
- Ultimate Fighting Championship
  - UFC Hall of Fame (Fight Wing, Class of 2021) vs. Jon Jones 1 at UFC 165
  - Fight of the Night (Four times) vs. Jon Jones 1, Jimi Manuwa, Daniel Cormier and Glover Teixeira
  - Performance of the Night (One time) vs. Jimi Manuwa
  - Latest knockout in a light heavyweight 5 round fight (1:07 into round 5) vs. Glover Teixeira at UFC Fight Night 109
  - UFC.com Awards
    - 2013: Fight of the Year vs. Jon Jones 1
    - 2015: Ranked #2 Fight of the Year vs. Daniel Cormier
- World MMA Awards
  - 2013 Fight of the Year vs. Jon Jones on 21 September
  - 2013 International Fighter of the Year
- ESPN
  - 2013 Fight of the Year vs. Jon Jones (UFC 165)
- Sherdog
  - 2011 All-Violence 3rd Team
  - 2013 All-Violence 2nd Team
  - 2013 Fight of the Year vs. Jon Jones (UFC 165)
- Fox Sports
  - 2013 Fight of the Year vs. Jon Jones (UFC 165)
- Yahoo! Sports
  - 2013 Fight of the Year vs. Jon Jones (UFC 165)
- MMA Junkie
  - 2013 Fight of the Year vs. Jon Jones (UFC 165)
  - 2015 #4 Ranked Fight of the Year vs. Daniel Cormier at UFC 192
  - 2015 October Fight of the Month vs. Daniel Cormier (UFC 192)
  - 2017 May Knockout of the Month vs. Glover Teixeira (UFC Fight Night 109)
- MMA Fighting
  - 2013 Fight of the Year vs. Jon Jones (UFC 165)
- MMA Weekly
  - 2013 Fight of the Year (vs. Jon Jones) (UFC 165)
- Nordic MMA Awards – MMAviking.com
  - 2011 Fighter of the Year
  - 2012 Fighter of the Year
  - 2013 Fight of the Year vs. Jon Jones
  - 2017 Knockout of the Year vs. Glover Teixeira
  - 2019 Fighter of the Decade

=== Amateur boxing ===
- AIBA: Swedish Boxing Federation
  - 2003 Swedish National Youth Light Heavyweight Champion
  - 2008 KP Cup Boxing Heavyweight Tournament Winner
  - 2009 KP Cup Boxing Heavyweight Tournament Winner
  - 2009 Tensta Box Open Heavyweight Tournament Winner

=== Submission grappling ===
- Swedish Submission Wrestling Federation
  - 2008 Grapplers Paradise 4 −99 kg (−218 lbs) tournament winner

== Mixed martial arts record ==
Professional record breakdown
26 matches	18 wins	8 losses
By knockout	11	3
By submission	3	3
By decision	4	2

Res.	Record	Opponent	Method	Event	Date	Round	Time	Location	Notes
Loss	18–8	Nikita Krylov	KO (punches)	UFC Fight Night: Blaydes vs. Aspinall	23 July 2022	1	1:07	London, England	Return to Light Heavyweight.
Loss	18–7	Fabrício Werdum	Submission (armbar)	UFC on ESPN: Whittaker vs. Till	26 July 2020	1	2:30	Abu Dhabi, United Arab Emirates	Heavyweight debut.
Loss	18–6	Anthony Smith	Submission (rear-naked choke)	UFC Fight Night: Gustafsson vs. Smith	1 June 2019	4	2:38	Stockholm, Sweden	
Loss	18–5	Jon Jones	KO (punches)	UFC 232	29 December 2018	3	2:02	Inglewood, California, United States	For the vacant UFC Light Heavyweight Championship.
Win	18–4	Glover Teixeira	KO (punches)	UFC Fight Night: Gustafsson vs. Teixeira	28 May 2017	5	1:07	Stockholm, Sweden	Fight of the Night.
Win	17–4	Jan Błachowicz	Decision (unanimous)	UFC Fight Night: Arlovski vs. Barnett	3 September 2016	3	5:00	Hamburg, Germany	
Loss	16–4	Daniel Cormier	Decision (split)	UFC 192	3 October 2015	5	5:00	Houston, Texas, United States	For the UFC Light Heavyweight Championship. Fight of the Night.
Loss	16–3	Anthony Johnson	TKO (punches)	UFC on Fox: Gustafsson vs. Johnson	24 January 2015	1	2:15	Stockholm, Sweden	UFC Light Heavyweight title eliminator.
Win	16–2	Jimi Manuwa	TKO (knee and punches)	UFC Fight Night: Gustafsson vs. Manuwa	8 March 2014	2	1:18	London, England	Performance of the Night. Fight of the Night.
Loss	15–2	Jon Jones	Decision (unanimous)	UFC 165	21 September 2013	5	5:00	Toronto, Ontario, Canada	For the UFC Light Heavyweight Championship. Fight of the Night.
Win	15–1	Maurício Rua	Decision (unanimous)	UFC on Fox: Henderson vs. Diaz	8 December 2012	3	5:00	Seattle, Washington, United States	
Win	14–1	Thiago Silva	Decision (unanimous)	UFC on Fuel TV: Gustafsson vs. Silva	14 April 2012	3	5:00	Stockholm, Sweden	
Win	13–1	Vladimir Matyushenko	TKO (punches)	UFC 141	30 December 2011	1	2:13	Las Vegas, Nevada, United States	
Win	12–1	Matt Hamill	TKO (punches and elbows)	UFC 133	6 August 2011	2	3:34	Philadelphia, Pennsylvania, United States	
Win	11–1	James Te Huna	Submission (rear-naked choke)	UFC 127	27 February 2011	1	4:27	Sydney, Australia	
Win	10–1	Cyrille Diabaté	Submission (rear-naked choke)	UFC 120	16 October 2010	2	2:41	London, England	
Loss	9–1	Phil Davis	Submission (anaconda choke)	UFC 112	10 April 2010	1	4:55	Abu Dhabi, United Arab Emirates	
Win	9–0	Jared Hamman	KO (punches)	UFC 105	14 November 2009	1	0:41	Manchester, England	
Win	8–0	Vladimir Shemarov	KO (punches)	Superior Challenge 3	30 May 2009	1	2:37	Stockholm, Sweden	
Win	7–0	Pedro Quetglas	TKO (punches)	The Zone FC 3	8 November 2008	1	2:08	Gothenburg, Sweden	
Win	6–0	Krzysztof Kułak	Decision (unanimous)	KSW Extra	13 September 2008	2	5:00	Dabrowa Górnicza, Poland	Catchweight (209 lb) bout.
Win	5–0	Matteo Minonzio	TKO (punches)	The Zone FC 2	10 May 2008	1	3:52	Gothenburg, Sweden	
Win	4–0	Florian Muller	TKO (knee to the body)	Fite Selektor	13 March 2008	2	3:44	Dubai, United Arab Emirates	
Win	3–0	Farbod Fadami	TKO (punches)	The Zone FC 1	9 February 2008	1	2:31	Stockholm, Sweden	
Win	2–0	Mikael Haydari	TKO (punches)	FinnFight 9	15 December 2007	1	0:50	Turku, Finland	
Win	1–0	Saku Heikkola	Submission (rear-naked choke)	Shooto Finland: Chicago Collision 3	17 November 2007	2	3:42	Lahti, Finland	

== Grappling record ==
4 Matches, 4 Wins (2 Submissions)
Result	Rec.	Opponent	Method	Event	Division	Date	Location
Win	4–0	(Sweden) Anton Turkalj	Points	AK Fighting Championship 3	−99 kg Superfight	11 December 2019	Gothenburg, Sweden
Win	3–0	(Sweden) Christopher Lee-Klockare	Submission (rear-naked choke)	Fight Night Nacka 7	−93 kg Superfight	14 February 2009	Stockholm, Sweden
Win	2–0	(Sweden) Mikael Persson	Submission (arm-triangle choke)	Grapplers Paradise 4	−99 kg Absolute	21 September 2008	Uppsala, Sweden
Win	1–0	(Sweden) Michael Forsman	Points	Neoblood 15	−93 kg Superfight	16 December 2006	Gothenburg, Sweden

== Pay-per-view bouts ==
No.	Event	Fight	Date	Venue	City	PPV Buys
1.	UFC 165	Jones vs. Gustafsson	21 September 2013	Air Canada Centre	Toronto, Ontario, Canada	310,000
2.	UFC 192	Cormier vs. Gustafsson	3 October 2015	Toyota Center	Houston, Texas, U.S.	250,000
3.	UFC 232	Jones vs. Gustafsson 2	29 December 2018	The Forum	Inglewood, California, U.S.	700,000
Total sales						1,260,000

== Filmography ==
Year	Title	Role	Notes
2015	Johan Falk – Blodsdiamanter / Johan Falk – Blood Diamonds	Polisinsatschef (Police Task Force Commander)	

== See also ==
- List of current GFL fighters
- List of male mixed martial artists
