= Alliance MMA Gym =

Mixed martial arts training facility

- Est.: 2007
- Founded by: Brandon Vera
- Primary owners: Eric Del Fierro
- Primary trainers: Eric Del Fierro
- Current titleholders: Phil De Fries (KSW Heavyweight Champion)
- Prominent fighters: Dominick Cruz; Alexander Gustafsson; Brandon Vera; K. J. Noons; Jeremy Stephens; Frank Shamrock; Ross Pearson; Michael Chandler; Wilson Reis; Jan Blachowicz; Chris Leben; Danny Martinez; Cat Zingano; Angela Hill
- Headquarters: San Diego, California, U.S.
- Address: 3666 Midway Dr
- Training facilities: San Diego, California, U.S. Chula Vista, California, U.S. El Cajon, California, U.S. Quezon City, Philippines

Alliance MMA Gym is a mixed martial arts training facility based in San Diego, California. It is one of the top professional MMA training camps, with facilities in San Diego, Chula Vista, El Cajon, and Quezon City, Philippines.

Alliance MMA Gym has trained a number of professional mixed martial artists who have found success in organizations such as the Ultimate Fighting Championship (UFC), World Extreme Cagefighting (WEC), Strikeforce and Bellator MMA.

== History ==
Alliance MMA Gym was opened by Brandon Vera in 2007, following his departure from his position as a trainer at City Boxing in San Diego.

== Notable fighters ==
- Brandon Vera - Former One Championship Heavyweight Champion
- Joey Beltran - Former Bellator Light Heavyweight Title Challenger
- Jan Błachowicz - Former UFC Light Heavyweight Champion, Former KSW Light Heavyweight Champion
- Michael Chandler - Former Bellator Lightweight Champion (2 Time), Fought For Bellator Lightweight Championship 6 Times, Record; (4:2), Fought For Bellator Lightweight Interim Championship 1 Time, Record; (0:1)
- Dominick Cruz - First UFC 2-Time Bantamweight Champion, 3 defenses, Former, Last WEC Bantamweight Champion, 2 defenses
- Phil Davis - Former Bellator Light Heavyweight Champion, First Bellator Light Heavyweight Grand Prix Champion, Former UFC Light Heavyweight Contender
- Cat Zingano - Current Bellator Women's Featherweight Contender, Former UFC Women's Bantamweight Contender, 1x title challenger
- Phil De Fries
- Omar de la Cruz
- Tomasz Drwal
- Wilson Reis
- Mike Easton
- Danny Martinez
- Alexander Gustafsson - UFC Light Heavyweight Contender, 3x title contender
- Frank Shamrock - First UFC Middleweight (now Light Heavyweight) Champion, first Strikeforce Middleweight Champion, and first WEC Light Heavyweight Champion
- Chris Leben - First WEC Middleweight Champion, Former UFC Middleweight Contender
- K. J. Noons - Retired UFC Lightweight, Former EliteXC Lightweight Champion, Former Strikeforce Welterweight Challenger
- Jorge Ortiz
- Ross Pearson - Current UFC Lightweight
- Rolando Perez
- Viktor Pešta - Current UFC Heavyweight
- Ed Ratcliff
- Jeremy Stephens - Current Professional Fighters League Lightweight, Former UFC Featherweight
- Angela Hill - Current UFC Strawweight
