= Jon Jones =

American mixed martial artist (born 1987)

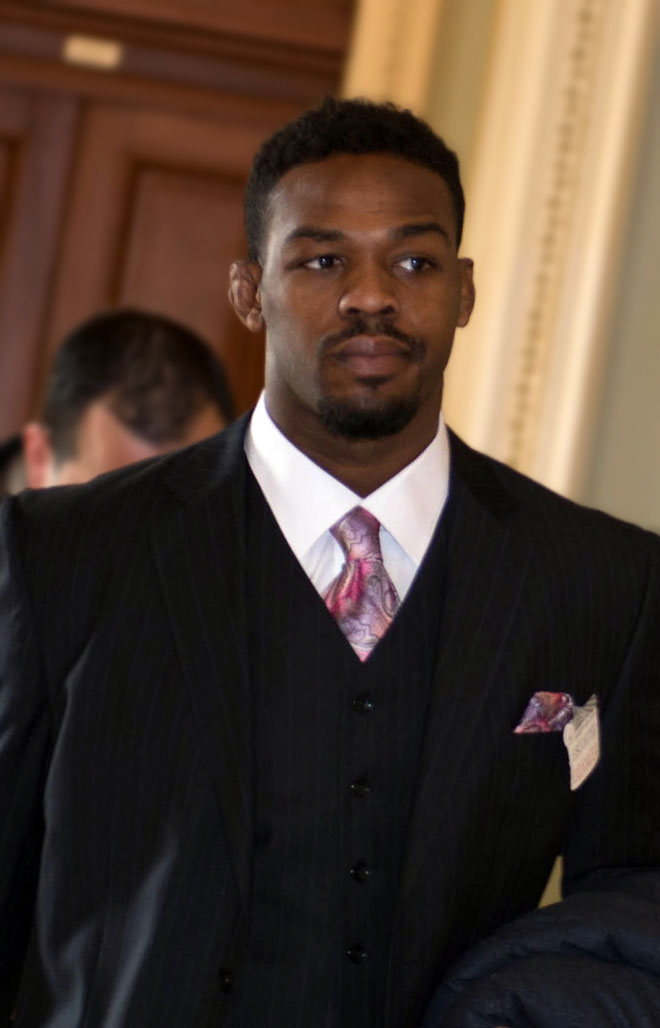
- Jones in 2014
- Born: Jonathan Dwight Jones; July 19, 1987 (age 39); Rochester, New York, U.S.
- Nickname: Bones
- Height: 6 ft 4 in (193 cm)
- Weight: 238 lb (108 kg; 17 st 0 lb)
- Division: Light heavyweight (2008–2020); Heavyweight (2023–2025)
- Reach: 84 1/2 in (215 cm)
- Fighting out of: Albuquerque, New Mexico, U.S.
- Team: Team Bombsquad (2008–2009); Jackson Wink MMA Academy (2009–2021); Jackson's MMA Acoma (2021–present); Fight Ready (2021)
- Rank: Black belt in Gaidojutsu under Greg Jackson; Purple belt in Brazilian jiu-jitsu under Roberto Alencar
- Wrestling: NJCAA Wrestling
- Years active: 2008–2024

Mixed martial arts record
- Total: 30
- Wins: 28
- By knockout: 11
- By submission: 7
- By decision: 10
- Losses: 1
- By disqualification: 1
- No contests: 1

Other information
- University: Iowa Central Community College
- Children: 5
- Notable relatives: Arthur Jones (older brother); Chandler Jones (younger brother)
- Notable school: Union-Endicott High School
- Website: www.jonnybones.com
- Mixed martial arts record from Sherdog
Medal record
Men's collegiate wrestling
Representing Iowa Central CC
NJCAA Championships
Gold medal – first place	2006 Rochester	197 lb

Signature
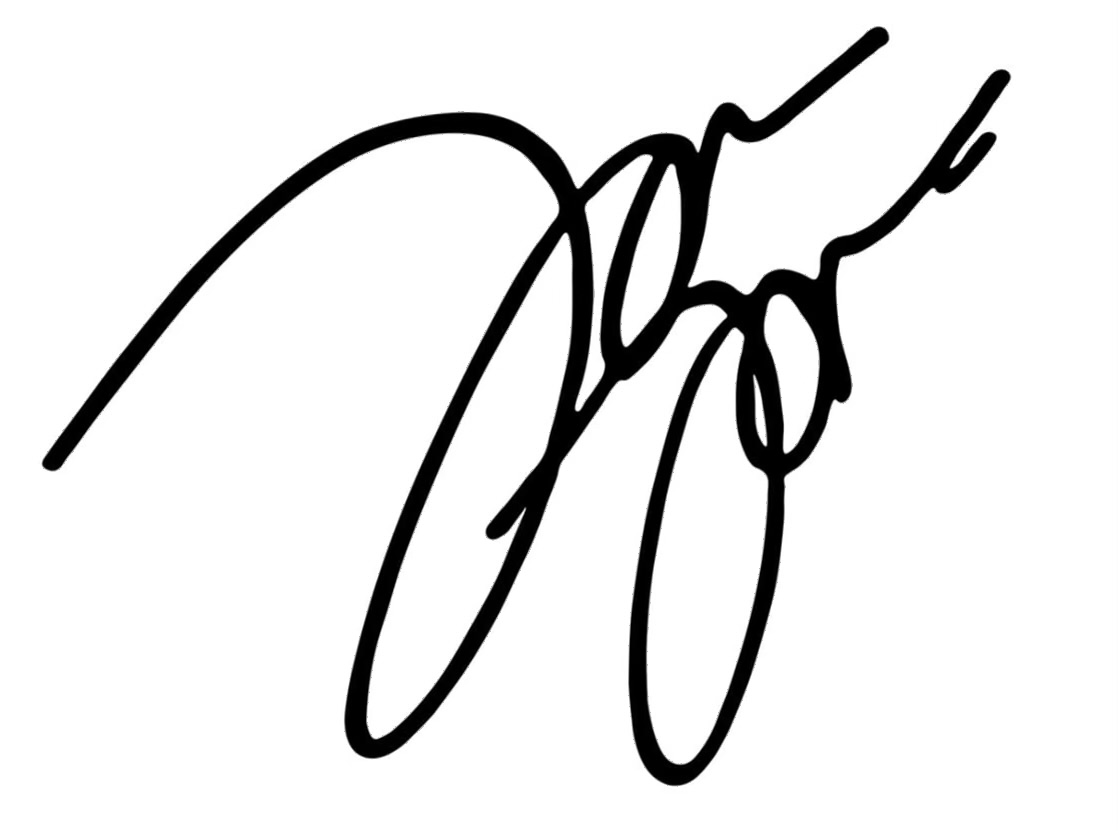

Jonathan Dwight Jones (born July 19, 1987) is an American former professional mixed martial artist who competed from 2008 to 2025. During his career with the Ultimate Fighting Championship (UFC), he was a two-time Light Heavyweight Champion, holding the title from 2011 to 2015 and again from 2018 to 2020, and held the Heavyweight Championship from 2023 to 2025. He also held the interim Light Heavyweight Championship in 2016. He is widely regarded as one of the greatest mixed martial artists of all time.

Jones became the youngest champion in UFC history with his light heavyweight title victory over Maurício Rua at age 23. He holds many UFC records in the light heavyweight division, including the most title defenses, most wins, and longest win streak. He has also defeated nine different former undisputed UFC champions, the most in history. During much of his championship reign, Jones was widely considered to be the best pound-for-pound fighter in the world and spent a record 1,743 days as the UFC's #1 pound-for-pound fighter. Never stopped nor outscored during his career, Jones's only professional loss is a controversial disqualification against Matt Hamill; a result disputed by Hamill and UFC president Dana White.

Between 2015 and 2017, Jones was involved in several controversies and lost his light heavyweight title three times as a result of disciplinary action. He was first stripped of his title and removed from the official rankings by the UFC in 2015 after he was arrested on felony hit-and-run charges. His subsequent returns to the UFC in 2016 and 2017 saw him emerge victorious in title bouts against Ovince Saint Preux and Daniel Cormier, but were both cut short by Jones testing positive for banned substances and receiving further suspensions, with the latter reversed to a no contest. After his 2017 suspension was lifted, Jones reclaimed the championship by defeating Alexander Gustafsson in 2018, which he held until voluntarily vacating it in 2020. Jones spent three years away from MMA before returning in 2023 to win the heavyweight title against Ciryl Gane and holding it until his 2025 retirement. He was the eighth UFC fighter to win titles in two different weight classes and the fourth to defend titles in two different divisions.

== Early life ==
Jones was born on July 19, 1987, in Rochester, New York. At the age of 10, he relocated with his family to the Binghamton area. His father Arthur is a pastor at Mount Sinai Church of God in Christ in Binghamton, New York. Growing up, family life revolved around church, and Jones even sang in the church choir. Arthur discouraged Jon's fighting career, "I wanted him to preach. I tried to discourage him from being a fighter. I told him you don't want to do that. You can do other things. Be a pastor." Jon's mother, Camille, died in 2017 at the age of 55, after a long battle with diabetes.

Jon was one of four children. His older brother Arthur and younger brother Chandler both played in the National Football League (NFL) as defensive ends. His older sister, Carmen, died of a brain tumor before her 18th birthday.

== Background ==
=== High school ===
Before beginning his MMA career, Jones was a stand-out high school wrestler at Union-Endicott High School in Endicott, New York. As a junior in 2004, he won the Northeast Junior Greco‑Roman Regional Championship at 189-pounds and was named Most Outstanding Wrestler at the event. That year, he also won the STAC Wrestling Championship and placed third at the NYSPHSAA Division I state championships. As a senior in 2005, he captured the NYSPHSAA Division I state title at 189-pounds, and was named an NHSCA Senior All‑American. Over the course of his high school career, he was a two-time Section IV champion. He also played football as a defensive lineman; due to his slight frame, his coach nicknamed him "Bones".

=== College ===
As a freshman at Iowa Central Community College, Jones won a NJCAA wrestling national championship, helped secure the overall team championship, and was named an All-American. After transferring to Morrisville State College to study Criminal Justice, he dropped out of college to begin his MMA career.

== Mixed martial arts career ==
=== Early career ===
Jones made his professional MMA debut in April 2008. He amassed an undefeated record of 6–0 over a period of three months, finishing all of his opponents. In his last bout before signing with the UFC, Jones defeated Moyses Gabin at BCX 5 for the USKBA Light Heavyweight Championship. He won the fight via TKO in the second round.

=== Ultimate Fighting Championship ===
==== Debut and rise to contender status ====
Jones made his UFC debut against André Gusmão at UFC 87 on August 9, 2008. Jones had accepted the deal on two weeks' notice as a late replacement for Tomasz Drwal. Jones won via unanimous decision (30–27, 29–28, and 30–27), using takedowns and unorthodox striking, such as spinning elbows and a spinning back kick.

In his second UFC match, Jones took on veteran Stephan Bonnar at UFC 94 on January 31, 2009. Jones won the fight by unanimous decision.

Jones's third fight was against Jake O'Brien at UFC 100 on July 11, 2009. Jones won via submission. In September 2009, Jones was rewarded for his victories by signing a new, four-fight contract with the UFC.

On December 5, 2009, Jones fought fellow light heavyweight prospect Matt Hamill at The Ultimate Fighter: Heavyweights Finale. Jones used his wrestling to dominate Hamill, but was disqualified for the use of illegal 12–6 elbows. The Unified Rules of Mixed Martial Arts prohibited downward elbow strikes, and Jones was initially only penalized a point from the round. However, Hamill was unable to continue due to his dislocated shoulder. Consequently, the replay simulation was reviewed, and showed that Jones's elbows further damaged Hamill's already bloody and lacerated nose. This marked the first time that Nevada had used its recently enacted instant replay rule, in which the referee's decision was supported by the commission, which utilized a slow-motion replay to review the elbows. UFC president Dana White was aggrieved that referee Steve Mazagatti ruled the bout as a disqualification, which resulted in a loss for Jones, saying that it should have been a no contest. In 2019, White said he was still attempting to have the result overturned to a no contest by the Nevada State Athletic Commission.

Jones fought Brandon Vera on March 21, 2010, at UFC Live: Vera vs. Jones. Jones won the fight by TKO. The elbow delivered to stop the fight also broke Vera's face in three places. Jones also won the "Knockout of the Night" award.

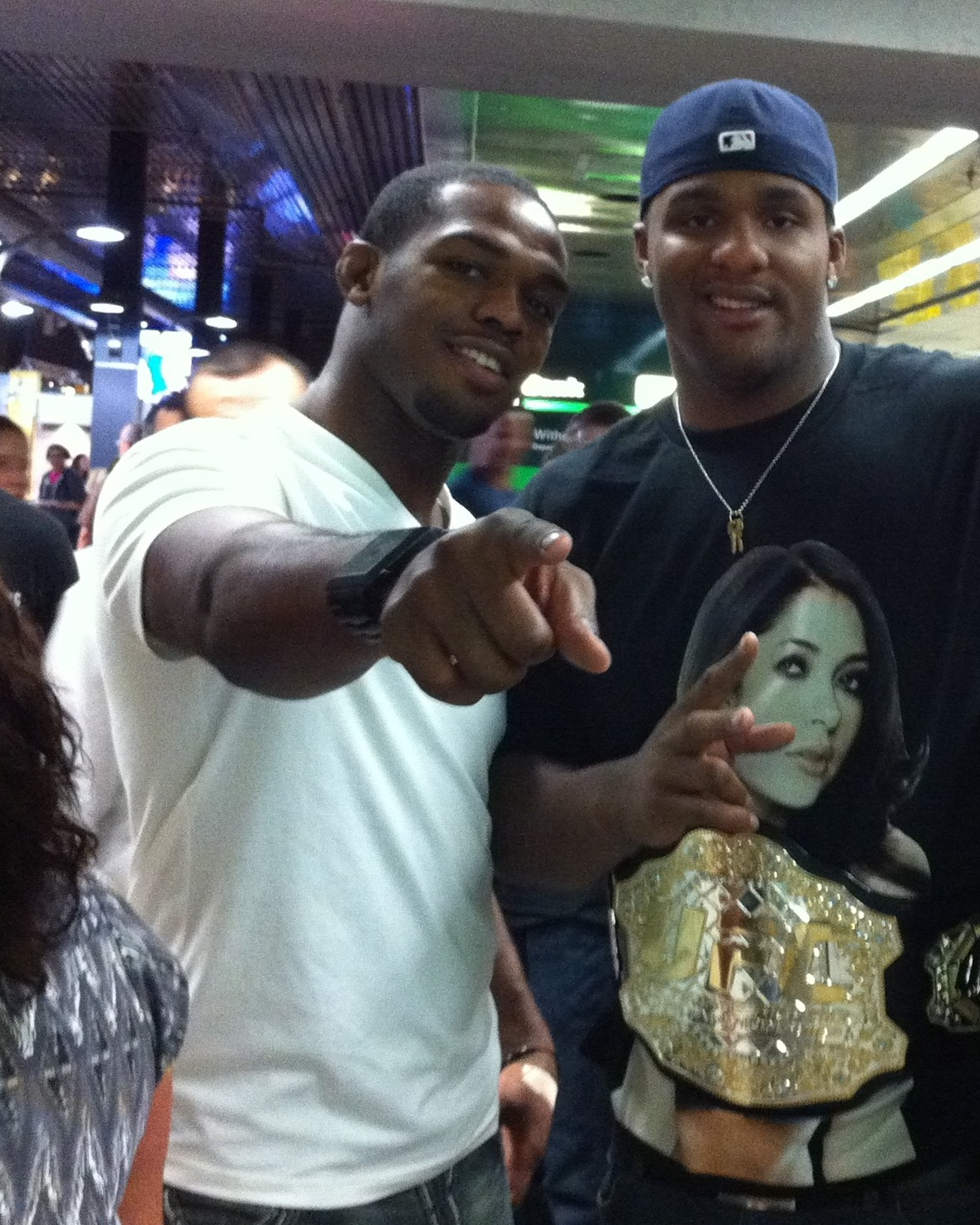
Jones and basketball player Glen Davis in 2010

Jones defeated former IFL Light Heavyweight Champion Vladimir Matyushenko by TKO with elbows in 1:52 of the first round on August 1, 2010, at UFC Live: Jones vs. Matyushenko. Dana White promised Jones a "huge step-up in the competition", if he managed to defeat Matyushenko. Following the match with Matyushenko, White said, "Vladimir Matyushenko is a guy who I have a lot of respect for and I didn't think it was going to happen that easy. Jones is the real deal and he just catapulted himself tonight into the top eight in the world. Tonight solidified it. ... He's got to keep his head together, stay focused and keep doing all the right things in training. He's smart, good looking and bad-ass. He's going to make a lot of money—this kid is going to do very well."

After defeating Matyushenko, Jones stated that he wanted a "top-three opponent" for his next fight. Jones mentioned in an interview with Inside MMA that he would be facing the winner of Antônio Rogério Nogueira vs. Ryan Bader. Reports that Jones had previously been offered a match with Nogueira, but turned it down, turned out to be false. In the Inside MMA interview, Jones also stated that he had been informed by Dana White and Lorenzo Fertitta that if he finished his next two fights, he would likely receive a title shot.

White soon confirmed that Jones would face the undefeated Ultimate Fighter winner Ryan Bader, on February 5, 2011, at UFC 126. Jones handed Bader his first professional loss by defeating him via submission due to a guillotine choke in the second round after dominating Bader in the first round. Jones was awarded the "Submission of the Night" bonus.

==== Light Heavyweight Champion ====
Immediately after the bout with Bader, it was revealed that title contender and Jones's training partner Rashad Evans had sustained a knee injury in training, and would not be able to compete in his scheduled match with UFC light heavyweight champion Maurício "Shogun" Rua. Jones was told by Joe Rogan in the post-fight interview that he would replace Evans in the fight for the UFC Light Heavyweight Championship. On March 19, 2011, at UFC 128, Jones defeated Rua by TKO at 2:37 of Round 3, becoming the youngest ever UFC champion. After an early flying knee that badly hurt the champion, Shogun was dominated throughout the three rounds. A body shot and knee to the head dropped the champion to his knees, causing the referee to step in and halt the match.

Jones's first title defense was expected to be on August 6, 2011, at UFC 133 against Rashad Evans, his former friend and teammate, but Jones was sidelined with a hand injury. It was initially announced that the hand injury would require surgery, but Jones opted for rest and rehabilitation without surgery after further consultations with doctors. Jones's injury was originally thought to keep him out of action until late 2011, but he instead made his first title defense against Quinton Jackson on September 24, 2011, at UFC 135. Jones defeated Jackson via rear naked choke submission at 1:14 in the 4th round. In the process, he became the first UFC fighter to submit Jackson. In 2012, Jones said that this was his favorite fight up to that point.

Jones vs. Evans was in the works for a second time, and a bout was targeted for December 10, 2011, at UFC 140. However, a lingering thumb injury cost another title opportunity for Evans, and Jones instead faced Lyoto Machida at the same event. Jones successfully defended the light heavyweight title at UFC 140, stopping Machida at 4:26 of the second round via guillotine choke technical submission. This was the first submission loss in Machida's career.

Jones faced his arch rival and former teammate Rashad Evans on April 21, 2012, at UFC 145, and won via unanimous decision (49–46, 49–46, and 50–45). During the UFC 145 post fight press conference, Dana White confirmed that Jones's next opponent would be Dan Henderson. The Jones-Henderson fight was expected to take place at UFC 151, but Henderson pulled out of the bout due to injuries. Jones then refused a late replacement fight with Chael Sonnen after his coach Greg Jackson told him with three training days left, it would be difficult to prepare. UFC 151 was then subsequently canceled, the first cancelation in the company's 19-year history.

Jones's decision to decline the fight against Sonnen was criticized by UFC president Dana White, who said, "This is one of the most selfish, disgusting decisions that doesn't just affect you. This is affecting 16 other lives, their families, kids are going back to school. The list goes on and on of all the things, the money that was spent for fighters to train and the list goes on and on. Like I said, I don't think this is going to make Jon Jones popular with the fans, sponsors, cable distributors, television network executives or other fighters." However, Jones was defended by MMA analysts, who criticized White for promoting a thin card. It was later reported that Henderson was injured three weeks prior to the announcement, but kept the injury under wraps as he was still hoping to compete.

A rematch with Lyoto Machida was then announced for September 22, 2012, at UFC 152. Lyoto Machida, who was not contacted prior to the announcement, rejected the fight due to the lack of time to train before the bout. Jones, instead, defended the championship against Vitor Belfort on September 22, 2012, at UFC 152. Jones opened as a massive favorite (13-to-1) coming into the bout.

[I]t was not the finish that's the story of this evening. It's the refusal to be finished.

— Jeff Wagenheim on Jones' submission victory over Vitor Belfort at UFC 152

Despite almost being submitted via armbar in round one, Jones successfully defended the belt against Belfort via Americana submission in round four, and equaled Chuck Liddell's number of title defenses. Jones also won a $65,000 Submission of the Night bonus for his finish of Belfort.

Jones was chosen to coach opposite Chael Sonnen on Season 17 of the Ultimate Fighter. With a bout between the coaches taking place on April 27, 2013, at UFC 159. Jones displayed a lack of interest in the bout and actively downplayed the contest, making it clear that he did not believe Sonnen was a fit contender. In an interview, Sonnen did his best to garner interest in the bout, but Jones gave him the "silent treatment", and refused to make eye contact. Jones made quick work of his challenger, finishing Sonnen via TKO in the first round. However, he broke the phalanx (big toe) on his left foot during the fight. With the win, Jones tied Tito Ortiz for having most consecutive title defenses in UFC light heavyweight history.

Jones faced Alexander Gustafsson on September 21, 2013, at UFC 165. Jones was badly cut above the eye during the first round, but he won the back-and-forth fight via unanimous decision (48–47, 48–47, and 49–46). After the match, Jones said Gustafsson gave him the toughest fight of his career, and both were sent to the hospital for their injuries. Both men suffered lacerations and facial swelling, but were released from the hospital with no broken bones or serious injuries. The bout earned both fighters the Fight of the Night bonus award. The match received numerous positive reviews: "an epic battle", "instant-classic", "Fight of the Year", "Greatest light heavyweight title fight of all-time", "one of the greatest fights in UFC history". On March 8, 2020, it was announced that the fight will be inducted to UFC Hall of Fame's Fight Wing on July 9.

Jones was expected to take on Glover Teixeira on February 1, 2014, at UFC 169. However, on October 7, UFC President Dana White stated that the announcement for this fight on that card was premature and that Jones and Teixeira would face each other on a different card. On November 13, 2013, it was announced that Jones would fight Teixeira at UFC 170, scheduled for February 22, 2014; however, the next day it was announced that the match had been removed from the card. On December 4, 2013, it was announced that Jones and Teixeira would face each other at UFC 171 on March 15, 2014, in Dallas, Texas; however, the fight was moved again. Jones and Teixeira finally fought on April 26, 2014, at UFC 172. Jones won the bout via unanimous decision (50–45, 50–45, and 50–45).

On April 27, 2014, UFC President Dana White confirmed that Jones would next have a rematch against Gustafsson, and stated the possibility of the match taking place in a stadium in Sweden on pay-per-view. On May 24, 2014, it was indicated that the rematch would take place in Las Vegas on August 30, 2014, at UFC 177. The statement, and the time and venue, was not official, however, because Gustafsson was the only one who still had agreed to accept the match. On June 2, the fight was still on hold, and White explained the situation as "Jones doesn't want to fight Gustafsson", and instead expressed his preference for fighting Daniel Cormier.

On June 5, 2014, the UFC confirmed that the Jones vs. Gustafsson rematch would take place on September 27, 2014, at UFC 178. However, Gustafsson had to pull out of the match due to a torn meniscus. Jones was then expected to take on replacement Daniel Cormier at UFC 178. On August 12, 2014, it was announced that Jones had sustained a leg injury in training, causing him to withdraw. The bout was rescheduled, and eventually took place on January 3, 2015, at UFC 182. Jones won the fight by unanimous decision (49–46, 49–46, and 49–46). He also became the first person to take Cormier down, scoring three takedowns in total. The win also earned Jones his fourth Fight of the Night bonus award. It was later revealed that Jones had failed a drug test one month prior to the event, as he tested positive for cocaine. (see below in #Controversies)

==== First suspension and return ====
Jones was expected to defend his title against Anthony Johnson on May 23, 2015, at UFC 187. However, on April 28, Jones was stripped of the belt and suspended from the UFC indefinitely in connection with a hit-and-run incident where he crashed into a pregnant woman then fled the scene on foot. Cormier, who lost against Jones at UFC 182 in January 2015, replaced him and went on to defeat Anthony Johnson to take the vacant UFC Light Heavyweight Championship.

On October 23, 2015, the UFC announced that Jones had been reinstated to the active roster, nearly six months after his suspension was announced. A rematch with Cormier was expected to take place on April 23, 2016, at UFC 197. However, Cormier pulled out of the fight on April 1, citing a foot injury, and was replaced by Ovince Saint Preux. Jones defeated Saint Preux by unanimous decision (50–44, 50–45, and 50–45).

==== Second suspension and return ====
The rematch with Cormier was rescheduled and expected to take place on July 9, 2016, at UFC 200. However, on July 6, 2016, Jones was removed from the bout by USADA on June 16 after a potential doping violation. On November 7, 2016, it was announced that Jones had been suspended for one year by USADA, retroactive to July 7. Two days later, it was announced that Jones had been stripped of his interim title, making him the first fighter in UFC history to be stripped of a title twice. On December 15, Jones was also suspended by the Nevada State Athletic Commission (NSAC) for one year.

While on the sidelines, Jones fought retired MMA veteran Dan Henderson in a grappling match for the Submission Underground 2 tournament on December 10, 2016. After an even start, Jones eventually submitted Henderson with an arm-triangle choke six minutes into the bout. Following the fight, Jones expressed interest in competing against Chael Sonnen.

==== Third suspension and return ====
The rematch with Daniel Cormier took place on July 29, 2017, at UFC 214 at the Honda Center in Anaheim, California. Jones won the fight and re-captured the UFC Light Heavyweight Championship via knockout in the third round. After the fight, Jones was awarded a Performance of the Night bonus. After the fight, Jones praised Cormier as a "model champion", while recognizing his own personal failings. He then challenged Brock Lesnar to a fight. On August 22, it was announced that Jones had been flagged for a potential doping violation by USADA, stemming from his sample that was collected after weigh-ins July 28. He tested positive for Turinabol, an anabolic steroid. Jones was placed on a provisional suspension as a result. On September 13, USADA confirmed that both the "A" and "B" sample of Jones's tested positive for Turinabol. As a result, the California State Athletic Commission (CSAC) officially overturned the result of the fight to a no contest. Subsequently, UFC President Dana White made the decision to strip him of the Light Heavyweight championship, and return it to Daniel Cormier.

In September 2018, it was announced by USADA that Jones would serve a suspension of 15 months. From a potential suspension of 48 months USADA applied a reduction of 30 months for Jones's co-operation in identifying other anti-doping offences, and a further 3 months was applied by arbitrators McLaren in relation to Jones's degree of fault.

==== Second UFC Light Heavyweight Championship reign ====
On October 10, 2018, it was announced that Jones would return at UFC 232 on December 29, 2018, in a rematch with Alexander Gustafsson for the vacant UFC Light Heavyweight Championship. Jones defeated Gustafsson by technical knockout in the third round to win the UFC Light Heavyweight Championship.

In the first defense of his second championship reign, Jones faced Anthony Smith on March 2, 2019, in the main event at UFC 235. Jones dominated the fight, but was deducted two points in the fourth round after landing an illegal knee to Smith's head. He won the fight via unanimous decision with 48–44 on all three judges' scorecards.

Jones faced Thiago Santos on July 6, 2019, in the main event at UFC 239. He won the back-and-forth match via split decision (48–47, 47–48, and 48–47), defending his title for the second time.

Jones faced Dominick Reyes on February 8, 2020, in the main event of UFC 247. Jones won the fight via controversial unanimous decision (48–47, 48–47, and 49–46). Of the 21 media scorecards tracked by MMAdecisions.com, 14 scored the contest for Reyes, while seven favored Jones. With this win, Jones set the new record for most wins in UFC title fight history with 14 wins.

==== Disagreement with the UFC and move to heavyweight ====
After conflict with UFC President Dana White over pay in May 2020, Jones said he had vacated the UFC Light Heavyweight Championship. Jones was targeting a fight with heavyweight contender Francis Ngannou and, according to White, wanted "Deontay Wilder money", referring to Wilder's reported $25–30 million earnings in his rematch with Tyson Fury held in February 2020. On August 15, 2020, Jones announced on social media that he would be relinquishing the Light Heavyweight Championship, as well expressing his desire to move up to heavyweight.

==== Heavyweight Champion ====
After over three years removed from his last bout, Jones faced Ciryl Gane for the vacant UFC Heavyweight Championship on March 4, 2023, at UFC 285. He won the bout and earned the title via a guillotine choke submission in the first round. After the fight, Jones earned the Performance of the Night bonus award. Jones became the third fighter to win UFC titles at heavyweight and light heavyweight, following Randy Couture and Daniel Cormier.

Jones was scheduled to defend his title against former two-time heavyweight champion Stipe Miocic on November 11, 2023, at UFC 295. However, Jones was forced to pull out due to injury after tearing a pectoral tendon. As a result, a bout for the interim UFC Heavyweight Championship between Sergei Pavlovich and Tom Aspinall was scheduled for the event. Aspinall won via first-round knockout to become the interim champion.

One year after his injury, the bout between Jones and Miocic was rescheduled to November 16, 2024, at UFC 309. He won the fight by technical knockout via a spinning back kick followed by punches in the third round. With this twelfth title defense, Jones broke the record for most title defenses in UFC history. This fight earned him another Performance of the Night award.

Following the removal of Clay Guida from the UFC roster on January 15, 2025, Jones became the promotion's longest-tenured fighter.

=== Retirement ===
Following his title defense against Miocic, Jones expressed disinterest in fighting interim UFC Heavyweight Champion Tom Aspinall, instead calling out then UFC Light Heavyweight Champion Alex Pereira for a superfight. At the post-fight press conference of UFC on ABC: Hill vs. Rountree Jr. on June 21, 2025, Dana White announced that Jones had retired from mixed martial arts competition and that Aspinall was the new undisputed champion as a result.

On July 4, 2025, the day after UFC White House was announced, Jones said he re-entered the testing pool and is listed as active on the official UFC website. On March 9, 2026, after the White House card was announced and Jones was not on it, he requested his release from the UFC.

=== MMA coach ===
Jones has trained 2020 Olympic gold medalist Gable Steveson since Steveson's transition to mixed martial arts in 2025. Steveson decided to pursue MMA after assisting Jones during preparations for his November 2024 UFC heavyweight title defense against Stipe Miocic.

Jones has also helped train and mentor several other high-profile fighters. He worked extensively with Holly Holm prior to her knockout victory over Ronda Rousey at UFC 193, which earned her the UFC Bantamweight Championship. He also assisted former UFC Heavyweight Champion Andrei Arlovski in his preparation for UFC 187, which Arlovski won by TKO over Travis Browne.

Jones previously served as a head coach opposite Chael Sonnen on The Ultimate Fighter: Team Jones vs. Team Sonnen in 2013. He later coached on ALF Reality, a Russian reality fighting series, appearing in its second season in 2025 opposite Jorge Masvidal and its third season in 2026 opposite Daniel Cormier.

== Grappling career ==
=== 2008 Northeastern Grappler's Challenge ===
In January 2008, Jones participated in the Northeastern Grappler's Challenge in Ithaca, New York. Jones competed in two matches, both against Doug Fournet, whom Jones submitted both times with a 'Kimura'.

=== 2016 North American Grappling Association (NAGA) Tournament ===
After being called out by some MMA fans at the Europa Games expo in October 2016, Jones decided to take part in the NAGA no-gi grappling tournament, winning both of his matches with guillotines.

=== 2016 Submission Underground (SUG) ===
Jones agreed to headline the Submission Underground 2 main event on December 10, 2016, against Dan Henderson. Jones and Henderson had been scheduled to fight in the main event at UFC 151 in 2012, but Henderson suffered an injury during training and was forced to withdraw.

In the contest, Jones sumbitted Henderson with just over a minute left in regulation time.

== Training ==
Jon Jones kicking a punching bag in training

Jones has trained with Team BombSquad out of Cortland, New York, then briefly with the Tristar Gym in Montreal, Canada, and most recently at Jackson's MMA in Albuquerque, New Mexico. He has also trained in boxing with trainer Patrick O'Connor. During his suspension from the UFC, he trained as a power-lifter.

Jones's training emphasizes versatility, strength, and technical mastery, ensuring he remains dominant. His regimen includes a combination of wrestling drills, striking practice, grappling sessions, and high-intensity functional training, all designed to enhance his overall fight game. To refine his striking and transitions, Jones incorporates pad work, sparring, and clinch drills into his routine. His training also features explosive strength exercises, plyometrics, and agility drills, which boost his speed and power.

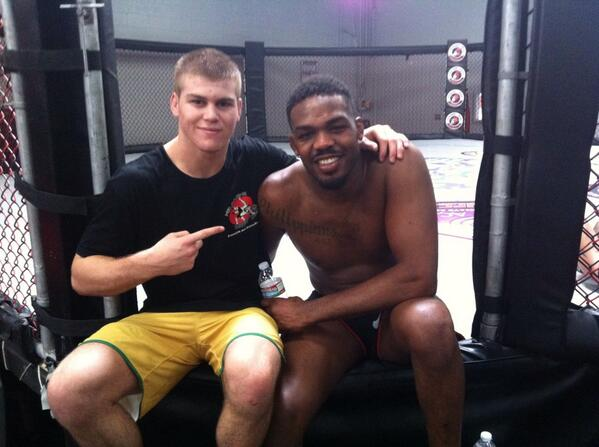
Jones and Jake Matthews after a training session

During training camps, Jones trains six days a week, balancing intense workouts with active recovery sessions. As the fight nears, he reduces the intensity to give his body time to fully recover. He shifts his focus to honing technical precision and engages in lighter sparring, ensuring he enters the fight in optimal physical and mental condition.

== Fighting style ==
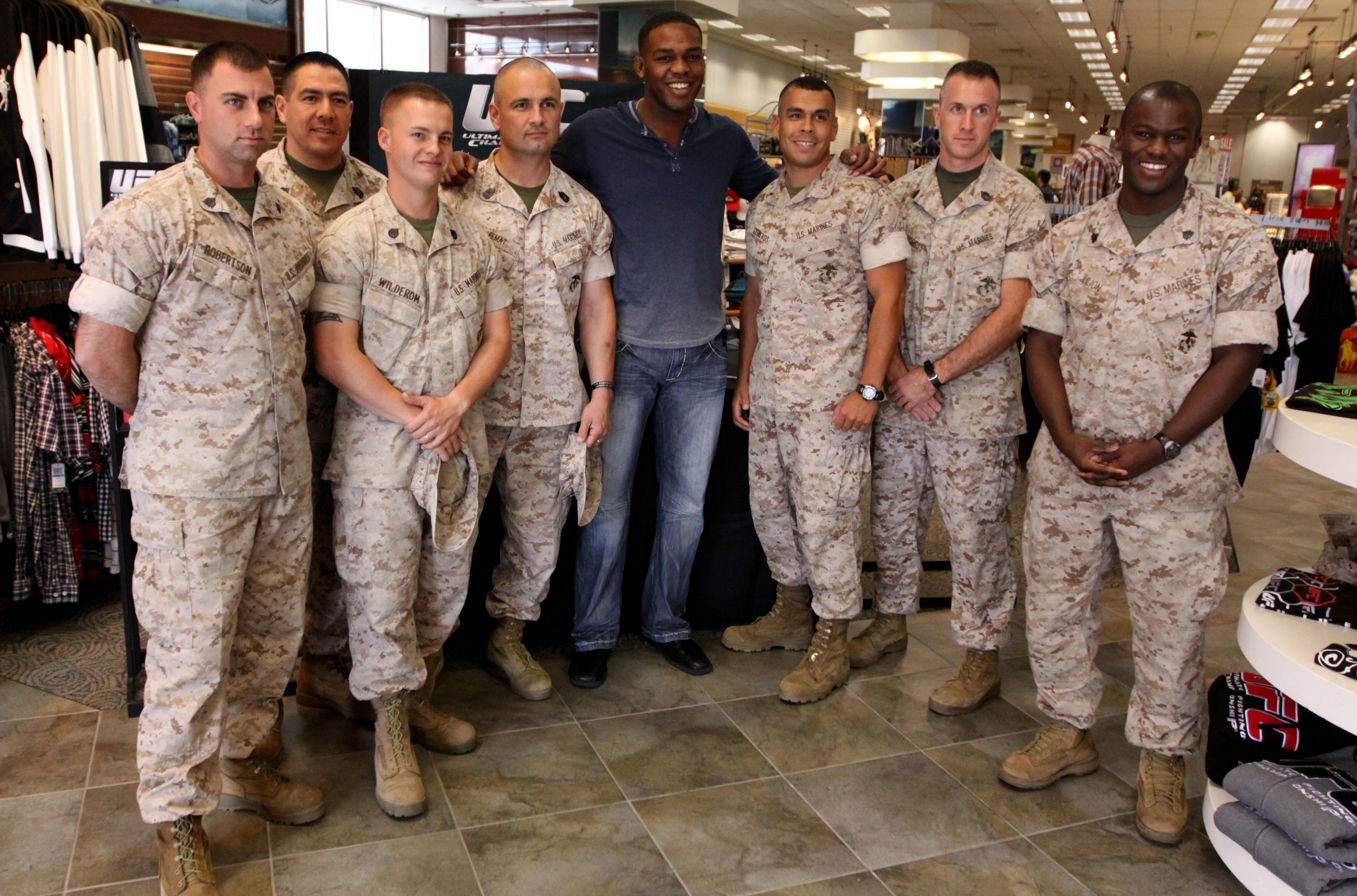
Jon Jones posing with Marines at Camp Pendleton in 2010

Jones has been described as "one of the most dynamic, innovative, and constantly evolving fighters in the history of MMA" and "perhaps the greatest martial artist ever to step into an octagon". Jones capitalizes on his long range and defensive wrestling to land blows in an unorthodox style.

He employs a diverse kicking technique, favoring front kicks to the body and head, roundhouse kicks to the legs and upper body, and his most known technique, the "oblique kick", a controversial move that targets his opponent's knee. The oblique kick was a technique popularized by Bruce Lee, whom Jones cited as an inspiration.

Jones also excels in the clinch, where he is skilled at controlling his opponent's arms and scoring elbow and knee strikes. He is particularly known for his spinning elbow, which has been clocked at over 900 degrees per second. He uses Greco-Roman wrestling takedowns like lateral drops from overhooks, as well as a variety of judo throws, like osoto gari, harai goshi and deashi harai, which he claims he picked up by watching them on YouTube. Jones has been praised for his positional control and ability to find openings for punches and elbow strikes on the ground.

== Personal life ==
In an interview with Joe Rogan on December 1, 2016, Jones stated that he has four daughters (aged 9, 8, 6 and 3). On February 23, 2022, Jones announced via Twitter that his fiancée Jessie had left him around two months prior. The two have since reconciled, and Jessie accompanied Jones into the cage after he won the heavyweight title at UFC 285 on March 4, 2023. In June 2024, Jones announced that he had been granted 50/50 custody over his son, marking the first time he indicated having a son.

Jones said that he was sexually assaulted as a child.

On March 19, 2011, Jones was en route to Great Falls Historic Park in Paterson, New Jersey, where he planned to meditate several hours ahead of his fight against Maurício "Shogun" Rua at UFC 128. He was accompanied by his coaches Mike Winkeljohn and Greg Jackson. As their driver prepared to drop them off, Jones observed an elderly couple screaming for help. The woman informed Winkeljohn that a man had smashed her car window and had run off with her GPS. Jones, along with his two coaches, chased after the robber, caught and tripped him, and held him down until the police arrived.

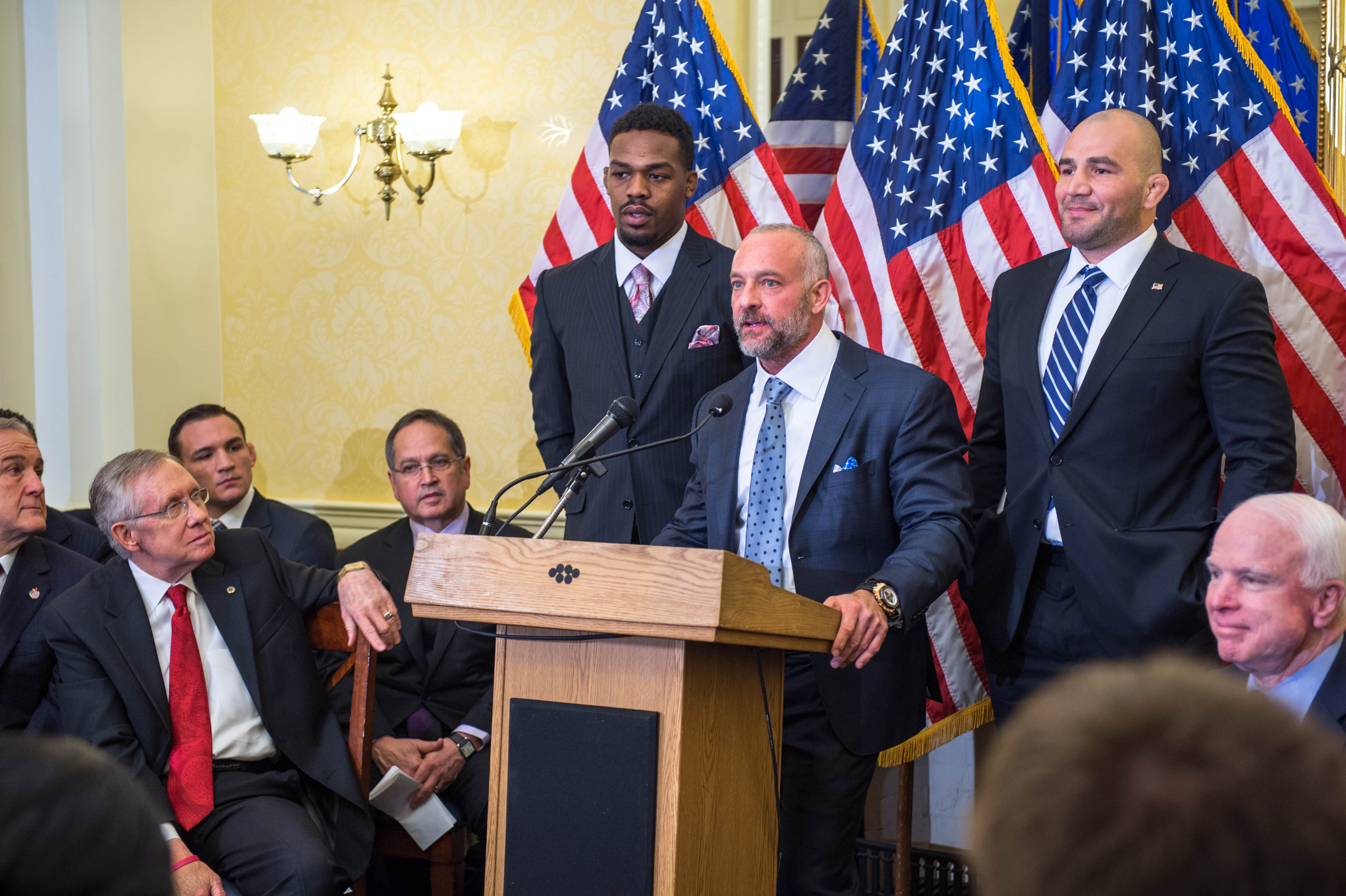
Jon Jones with Lorenzo Fertitta and Glover Teixeira at a U.S. Senate event in 2014

In January 2025, President Donald Trump extended a personal invitation to Jones for his inauguration, an event Jones attended.

On October 3, 2025, Jones' older brother, Arthur, died at the age of 39.

=== Business partnerships ===
In December 2010, Xyience announced that it had signed Jones to an endorsement deal as a brand ambassador.

On August 8, 2012, Jones became the first mixed martial artist to be sponsored by Nike on an international scale. He is also the first MMA fighter to have his own shoe line, and the first MMA fighter to represent Gatorade and MuscleTech in the Octagon. On December 16, 2014, Jones announced that he had signed a sponsorship deal with Reebok. However, on April 29, 2015, Reebok terminated their sponsorship following Jones's involvement in a hit-and-run incident. A day later, Jones also lost his sponsorship with MuscleTech.

On November 4, 2015, Jones signed a sponsorship deal with GAT Nutrition.

In March 2025, it was announced that Jones is a co-owner of "Dirty Boxing Championship". On June 23, Jones announced he had become co-owner and chief performance officer of Ketone-IQ. In September, it was announced Jones had joined 1win as its global ambassador.

=== Magazine covers ===
Jones has appeared on the covers of several magazines, including Fighters Only, FIGHT!, Tapout, L'Optimum, Athletes Quarterly, Ultimate MMA and UFC. He was also featured as an athlete in ESPN The Magazine's The Body Issue in October 2011.

== Charitable work ==
In December 2019, Jones donated and handed out $20,000 worth of coats to homeless people in Albuquerque, New Mexico. He also partnered with a local charity to give out hot meals and toys to children. In May 2020, Jones donated $25,000 to The Food Depot, an organization dedicated to combating hunger.

In 2020, Jones founded the C.A.R.E. Project, a nonprofit dedicated to the cleanup and beautification of New Mexico. Through his foundation, Jones has launched several initiatives aimed at supporting his community.

After defeating Ciryl Gane at UFC 285, Jones said his $50,000 Performance of the Night bonus would go towards community service in Albuquerque, New Mexico.

In February 2025, Jones partnered with Power to the Patients, a healthcare reform group, to advocate for more affordable and accessible healthcare.

Jones, together with 1win Charity, in a global campaign running from December 1–23, 2025, drew over 60,000 participants from 40+ countries and fulfilled more than 100 wishes worldwide, backed by a $100,000 prize fund, including personal gifts as well as community support such as donations to animal shelters and equipping a volunteer rescue team with tools.

== Controversies ==
=== Eye pokes ===
Jones has been criticized for repeatedly poking his opponents in the eyes. In response to the criticism, Jones released a video on Instagram in April 2014 in which he mocked fans by simulating crying and saying "Jones put his finger in his eye. Dirtiest fighter in MMA." After backlash towards the post, Jones deleted it from his account.

When asked about the controversy, UFC president Dana White stated, "we've got to stop that stuff. The openings of the hands and putting the hands on the face are something bad, but it happens with guys who have reach. They do that a lot." White clarified his position in another interview, saying, "It's not just taller fighters. Jones has that range and he can do it, but lots of guys do it because that's how you block punches. So you keep your hands open and you slap punches down. Then guys are rushing in and you're doing whatever, and guys get poked in the eyes." White also noted that in the fight against Glover Teixeira, after Jones was warned about the behavior, he was more careful to avoid any eye pokes throughout the rest of the match, a move he claimed Jones "would not [be] credited for" from detractors.

Jones later said in an interview, "I realize that I do it. I realize the criticism that I got from it. It's not on purpose. If you watch my fights, it's me extending my arm in a reactionary way. I do put a hand on people's foreheads to maintain distance. That's what you saw [against] Teixeira, but to say I am purposely poking people in the eye, it's just inaccurate." In 2017, the Unified Rules were amended to prohibit extension of a fighter's fingers towards the eyes of an opponent.

=== Daniel Cormier altercation ===
During a promotional event for UFC 178, on August 4, 2014, Jones and Daniel Cormier briefly scuffled during an on-stage staredown, initiated by Jones pressing his forehead against Cormier's forehead, prompting Cormier to shove Jones by the throat, to which Jones responded by throwing a punch. Both fighters were restrained by coaches and event organizers. Later that day during a press conference, Cormier expressed a desire to spit in Jones' face, to which Jones responded by threatening to kill Cormier. UFC chief legal officer Kirk Hendrick said "there are going to be ramifications". In addition, the Nevada State Athletic Commission requested a video copy of the altercation. On September 23, 2014, Jones was fined $50,000 and was ordered to undergo 40 hours of community service by the Nevada Athletic Commission. During the disciplinary hearing, Jones claimed to have lost a six-figure endorsement deal with Nike, but later admitted to fabricating the statement.

== Legal issues ==
=== Hit-and-run conviction ===
On April 27, 2015, Albuquerque, New Mexico, police stated that Jones was sought in connection with a hit and run early the previous morning. Jones was alleged to have run a red light and crashed his rental car in a collision involving two other vehicles. Jones allegedly fled the scene of the crash on foot, leaving an injured pregnant woman behind in another vehicle. The incident was witnessed by an off-duty police officer who identified the suspect as an African-American man, wearing a white shirt and dark pants, whom he believed to be Jones. According to witnesses, the man described as Jones then returned to the scene to grab cash from the vehicle before fleeing again. Paperwork found in the rental car was under the name of "Jonathan Jones". Inside the silver Buick SUV, law enforcement found a pipe with marijuana inside of it. Though initially wanted for questioning that could have resulted in a simple misdemeanor, Jones's charges were elevated to a felony on April 27 for injuring a person and purposely leaving the scene of an accident.

An arrest warrant was issued against Jones, and surrender arrangements were made between law enforcement and Jones's lawyers. That evening, Jones turned himself in to the Albuquerque Police Department. Later that evening, he posted bail of $2,500 and left the Bernalillo County Metro Detention Center. He made a court appearance on April 28 and did not enter a plea. The judge lifted any travel restrictions, and Jones was allowed to remain free, as long as he remained in contact with his lawyer and followed certain conditions. With a pending UFC fight still in his contract, UFC President Dana White and Zuffa owner Lorenzo Fertitta traveled to New Mexico from Las Vegas to meet with Jones in person. That same day, the UFC stripped Jones of the title, removed him from official rankings, and suspended him indefinitely. In a statement released that day, the UFC announced that Jones was stripped from his belt for violating the Athlete Code of Conduct Policy.

Jones apologized to his fans on Twitter by saying, "Got a lot of soul searching to do. Sorry to everyone I've let down." On September 29, 2015, he pleaded guilty to leaving the scene of an accident and was subsequently sentenced to up to 18 months of supervised probation. He was authorized to travel for work-related purposes. Jones met all of the conditions, which included 72 separate appearances for charity or youth outreach, avoiding a felony charge on his criminal record. In an interview in December 2016, Jones admitted he had run from the scene of the accident and had not checked on the occupant of the other vehicle.

=== Domestic violence arrest ===
In the early hours of September 24, 2021, a day after Jones was inducted into the UFC Hall of Fame for his fight with Alexander Gustafsson at UFC 165, police were called to the Caesars Palace resort hotel in Las Vegas, Nevada, responding to a domestic incident. According to a police report obtained by news site MMA Fighting, a 9-1-1 call was made by a hotel security guard when Jones's youngest daughter requested help, saying there was a domestic incident between Jones and his fiancée, Jessie Moses. Police arrived, cutting Jones off as he was attempting to flee. When investigating the room, they observed Moses with blood on her face and clothing, and with a bump on her lip. Moses said that Jones had left the hotel to go out with friends, and when he returned, he became agitated and pulled her hair. She said that the hair pulling was the extent of the physicality between the two, and that the blood on her face and clothing was from chapped lips. She also declined a temporary protective order against Jones. Police stated that while Jones was being detained, he headbutted the hood of the patrol vehicle and made threats, saying he could break free from the handcuffs. Jones was arrested after the investigation, taken to Clark County jail, and was charged with one count of domestic battery, a misdemeanor, and one count of tampering with a police vehicle, a felony. His bail was set at $16,000.

Jones posted bail approximately twelve hours after his arrest and was due to be arraigned in court on October 26. Four days after his arrest, Jones posted an Instagram video of himself lifting weights, with the caption saying "I have way too much trauma to consume alcohol, my brain simply can't handle it anymore. I will leave alcohol in my past forever." Three weeks after the arrest, Jones was banned from entering Jackson Wink MMA gym by his coach, Mike Winkeljohn, where Jones had been training since 2009. On December 16, it was revealed that the domestic battery charge against Jones was dropped. As for the felony tampering with a police vehicle charge, Jones pleaded no contest and was ordered to pay $750 in restitution, attend anger management therapy, and was given a court order to stay out of any and all legal trouble.

=== Other legal troubles ===
In the early morning of May 19, 2012, Jones drove his Bentley Continental GT into a pole in Binghamton, New York. Jones was arrested for driving under the influence (DUI) and was bailed out by his mother. He pleaded guilty to DUI charges and was order to pay a $1,000 fine, install ignition interlocks on all of his vehicles, complete a victims impact class, and had his driver's license suspended for six months.

On July 21, 2019, it was reported that Jones had been charged with battery for an alleged incident in April 2019 involving a cocktail waitress at a strip club in Albuquerque, New Mexico. The waitress claimed that Jones slapped her, put her in a choke hold and kissed her on the neck, and touched her after she had asked him to stop. The bench trial of the case was held on September 26, 2019, where Jones pleaded no contest to the charges and received a 90-day deferred sentence whereby he must avoid arrest, not violate the law, consume no alcohol or drugs and not return to the scene. He was also ordered to pay court fees during his unsupervised probation period, as per the court document.

Jones was arrested in the early morning of March 26, 2020, in Albuquerque. According to police reports, an Albuquerque PD officer heard what sounded like a gunshot and, upon further investigation, observed a black Jeep with Jones in the driver's seat. After noticing signs of intoxication, the responding officer administered a field sobriety test, which Jones failed. Jones was also given a breathalyzer test and registered a BAC more than twice the legal limit. Police then searched Jones's vehicle while arresting him for DWI and found a partially empty bottle of Recuerdo Mezcal as well as a black handgun underneath the driver's seat. Jones was arrested on the scene and taken to the Bernalillo County jail. Altogether, Jones was charged with aggravated DWI, negligent use of a firearm, possession of an open container, and driving with no proof of insurance. On March 31, it was announced that Jones had pleaded guilty to the DWI charge, after accepting a plea deal in which the other charges would be dropped. He was sentenced to four days' house arrest, one year of supervised probation, a minimum of 90 days of outpatient therapy, and he must complete 48 hours of community service.

On March 30, 2024, Crystal Martinez, a drug-testing agent from Drug Free Sport filed a police report stating that Jones allegedly assaulted her and threatened to kill her during a recent visit to his home when she was tasked with collecting a urine sample as part of the UFC's anti-doping program. On April 7, 2024, Albuquerque Police Department issued Jones a summons citing assault and interference with communications offenses. In July 2024, Jones pled not guilty to both misdemeanor charges, with bench trial being set to take place on August 22. Subsequently the trial was postponed until September 26 due to the police officer that responded to the incident could not attend on the original date. On October 29, 2024, Jones agreed to attend four hours of anger management classes to resolve charges.

On June 17, 2025, a criminal summons was filed in Bernalillo County, New Mexico, accusing Jones of a misdemeanor charge for allegedly fleeing the scene of a traffic accident that occurred on February 24. Albuquerque police responded to a crash involving a woman in the passenger seat who was "significantly intoxicated and lacking clothing from the waist down." She stated Jones had been driving and fled on foot. The woman called Jones afterward, during which police allege he appeared heavily intoxicated, refused to confirm his identity, and made statements "implying his capacity to employ lethal force through third parties." He is scheduled to appear at a July 24 bond arraignment, and his bench trial was set for September 2, 2025. New Mexico prosecutors dismissed misdemeanor charges.

== Failed drug tests ==
=== UFC 182 ===
On January 6, 2015, it was announced that Jones failed a drug test prior to UFC 182. He tested positive for benzoylecgonine, the primary metabolite of cocaine. Because benzoylecgonine is not banned out-of-competition by the World Anti-Doping Agency (WADA), the NSAC could not halt Jones from participating during UFC 182. He was randomly tested on December 3, 2014, and results came back on December 23. A week after his first test, Jones was tested again. He passed the second test, which meant that the cocaine metabolite was out of his system before the fight. When the news was made public, Jones went into rehab for one night. He was fined $25,000 on January 17 for violating the UFC's Athlete Code of Conduct policy. On January 19, 2015, Jones was interviewed for the first time since the failed drug test and said: "...I'm not a cocaine addict by any means or not even a frequent user. I just made a really dumb decision and got caught with my pants down in this whole situation."

Prior to his UFC 182 bout with Cormier, Jones's testosterone/epitestosterone (T/E) ratio was considered by some experts to be alarmingly low. Victor Conte, a former steroid distributor, who founded and led the Bay Area Laboratory Co-operative (BALCO), said of Jones's test "these (levels) are highly suspicious for Jon Jones, in my opinion. This is the reason that sophisticated anti-doping officials do target testing. So based on what we see here, my opinion is Jon Jones should be on a very short leash and should be random tested here until they sort out why he has these anomalies." This resulted in several journalists imploring the NSAC to utilize CIR (Carbon Isotope Ratio) testing on Jones's samples. "Luckily, this is a situation where speculation could quickly be ended. Jon Jones's drug test samples still exist and a simple Carbon Isotope Ratio test could be conducted to find the result. Put simply, a CIR test would be able to determine if the testosterone in Jones's system was synthetic or natural," Brent Brookhouse of Bloody Elbow wrote. However, according to NSAC executive director Bob Bennett, Jones's test samples had already undergone CIR testing by the same WADA-accredited lab which had reported his T/E ratios, noting that all CIR results came back clean. Additionally, he said there were three different types of tests done during each of the random tests: urine, blood testing for human growth hormone and a blood passport test. "The only negative was testing positive for cocaine metabolites," Bennett said.

=== UFC 200 ===
On July 8, 2016, a urine sample from Jones tested positive for two banned substances, clomiphene, an anti-estrogen substance, and letrozole, an aromatase inhibitor, prior to his scheduled championship bout with Cormier at UFC 200. The violation was from an "A" sample collection on June 16, with subsequent testing of the B sample confirming the doping. Both drugs, which are on the World Anti-Doping Agency banned substances list, are described as "hormone and metabolic modulators", which are not allowed to be used in or out of competition. As a result, Jones had to withdraw from the event, and was replaced by former middleweight champion Anderson Silva. Throughout the ordeal, Jones maintained his innocence, claiming that he was the victim of a contaminated product that he believed to be Cialis, which was later independently obtained, tested and found to be contaminated by the United States Anti-Doping Agency (USADA). On November 7, 2016, it was announced that Jones was issued a one-year suspension by USADA following his arbitration hearing, though the panel concluded that Jones did not take the banned substances intentionally, and was not a drug cheat.

=== UFC 214 ===
On August 22, 2017, it was announced that Jones was flagged for a potential doping violation by USADA, stemming from his test sample that was collected on July 28, one day before his rematch against Cormier at UFC 214. He tested positive for Turinabol, an anabolic steroid, and was placed on a provisional suspension as a result of the positive drug test. On September 13, the CSAC announced that it had overturned the result of the fight with Cormier from a KO victory for Jones to a 'no contest', after both Jones's A and B samples tested positive for Turinabol. Jones was also stripped of the title for a third time, and it was then returned to Cormier.

Jones stated that he did not knowingly take any prohibited substances, with his team believing Jones consumed tainted substances. Jones potentially faced up to a 4-year suspension if found guilty, but on September 18 he was handed a 15-month suspension by USADA, retroactive to July 28, plus three months community service. Thirty months were deducted from the four-year suspension because Jones provided "substantial assistance" to USADA. "Substantial assistance" refers to an athlete informing an anti-doping agency about a doping violation by another athlete. USADA said it reduced the suspension by a further three months after a hearing with an independent arbitrator, Richard McLaren, on September 15. Travis Tygart, CEO of USADA, said in a statement: "The independent arbitrator found that Jon Jones was not intentionally cheating in this case, and while we thought 18 months was the appropriate sanction given the other circumstances of the case, we respect the arbitrator's decision and believe that justice was served. This case is another strong reminder that athletes need to be extremely cautious about the products and supplements they use to ensure they are free of prohibited substances."

=== UFC 232 ===
Jones became eligible to fight again on October 28, 2018, and was scheduled to fight against Alexander Gustafsson at UFC 232 in Las Vegas on December 29. However, after further inconsistencies arose with his drug test on December 23, he was not granted a license to compete in Nevada, so the event was moved to Los Angeles. In order to receive a license from CSAC, Jones had to enroll into the VADA (Voluntary Anti-Doping Association) testing program, thus making him the first UFC fighter to be signed to both USADA and VADA testing programs simultaneously. Drug tests administered at UFC 232 found an ultra trace amount of turinabol, which doctors attributed to a long-term "pulsing effect" of the M3 metabolite detected in 2017. CSAC did not take disciplinary action against Jones as the medical experts stated that there was no evidence that Jones had re-administered a banned substance and no performance-enhancing benefits were gained.

== Championships and accomplishments ==
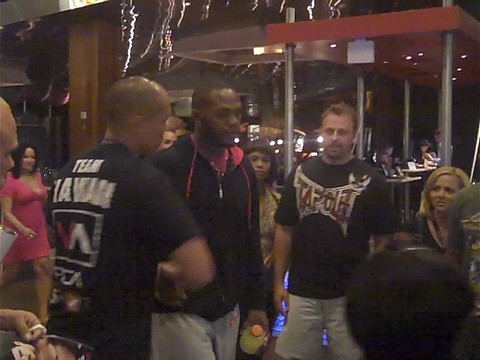
Jon Jones with fans at UFC 100 Fan Expo, Mandalay Bay Casino, Las Vegas

=== Mixed martial arts ===
- Ultimate Fighting Championship
  - UFC Hall of Fame (Fight Wing, Class of 2021) vs. Alexander Gustafsson 1 at UFC 165
  - UFC Heavyweight Championship (One time)
    - One successful title defense
    - Second longest Heavyweight champion reign in UFC history (840 days)
    - Most wins in UFC title fights (16)
    - Most successful title defenses in UFC history (12)
    - Most UFC title fights (17)
      - Second most submissions in UFC title fights (4)
      - Tied (Matt Hughes) for second most finishes in UFC title fights (8)
  - UFC Light Heavyweight Championship (Two times)
    - Eleven successful title defenses (Overall)
      - Eight successful title defenses (First reign)
      - Three successful title defenses (Second reign)
        - Most successful title defenses in UFC Light Heavyweight division history (11)
        - Most consecutive title defenses in UFC Light Heavyweight division history (8)
        - Most successful title defenses in a 12-month period in UFC history (4)
        - Fourth most consecutive title defenses in UFC history (8)
        - Second most significant strikes landed in a UFC Light Heavyweight title fight (138)
  - Interim UFC Light Heavyweight Championship (One time)
    - Longest Light Heavyweight champion reign in UFC history (1,501 days)
    - Most wins in UFC Light Heavyweight title fights (14)
    - Most UFC Light Heavyweight title fights (15)
    - Most finishes in UFC Light Heavyweight title fights (6)
  - Youngest champion in UFC history (23 years, 243 days)
    - Youngest fighter to defend a UFC championship (24 years, 67 days)
    - Eighth multi-divisional champion in UFC history
    - Fourth fighter to defend the title in two weight divisions in UFC history
    - Most total fight time in UFC title fights (4:56:20)
  - Fight of the Night (Four times) vs. Quinton Jackson, Lyoto Machida, Alexander Gustafsson and Daniel Cormier 1
  - Knockout of the Night (One time) vs. Brandon Vera
  - Submission of the Night (Two times) vs. Ryan Bader and Vitor Belfort
    - Tied (Ovince Saint Preux, Anthony Smith & Misha Cirkunov) for third most submissions in UFC Light Heavyweight division history (5)
  - Performance of the Night (Three times) vs. Daniel Cormier 2, Ciryl Gane and Stipe Miocic
    - Tied (Mauricio Rua & Ovince Saint Preux) for second most Post-Fight bonuses in UFC Light Heavyweight division history (8)
  - Longest unbeaten streak in UFC history (20)
  - Most consecutive wins in UFC Light Heavyweight division history (13)
    - Tied (Demetrious Johnson, Georges St-Pierre, Max Holloway & Khabib Nurmagomedov) for fifth longest win streak in UFC history (13)
  - Second most main events in UFC history (20) (behind Anderson Silva)
  - Most wins in UFC Light Heavyweight division history (20)
    - Tied (Demian Maia & Dustin Poirier) for seventh most wins in UFC history (22)
  - Most decision wins in UFC Light Heavyweight division history (10)
    - Most unanimous decision wins in UFC Light Heavyweight division history (9)
  - Most total fight time in UFC Light Heavyweight division history (5:40:15)
    - Second longest average fight time in UFC Light Heavyweight division history (15:28)
  - Most significant strikes landed in UFC Light Heavyweight division history (1,463)
    - Most total strikes landed in UFC Light Heavyweight division history (1,835)
  - Highest takedown defense percentage in UFC Light Heavyweight division history (95.0%)
    - Second highest takedown defense percentage in UFC history (95.0%)
  - Third most finishes in UFC Light Heavyweight division history (10)
  - Tied (Dustin Poirier, Georges St-Pierre, and Amanda Nunes) for most finishes against former UFC champions (6)
  - Most consecutive wins against former UFC champions (5)
  - Fifth most takedowns landed in UFC Light Heavyweight division history (42)
  - Most total leg strikes landed in a UFC Light Heavyweight bout (111) vs. Anthony Smith
  - Fourth lowest bottom position percentage in UFC history (0.19%)
    - Lowest bottom position percentage in UFC Light Heavyweight division history (0.2%)
    - Seventh lowest bottom position time in UFC Light Heavyweight division history (0:41)
  - Fourth most top position time in UFC Light Heavyweight division history (47:47)
  - Second most control time in UFC Light Heavyweight division history (1:19:42)
  - Fourth highest significant strike accuracy in UFC Light Heavyweight division history (57.9%)
  - Seventh highest striking differential in UFC Light Heavyweight division history (2.08)
  - Longest total reign as #1 pound for pound (1,743 days)
  - Holds wins over nine former UFC champions — Maurício Rua, Quinton Jackson, Lyoto Machida, Rashad Evans, Vitor Belfort, Glover Teixeira, Daniel Cormier, Stipe Miocic and Ciryl Gane
  - UFC Honors Awards
    - 2023: Fan's Choice Submission of the Year Winner vs. Ciryl Gane & President's Choice Performance of the Year Nominee vs. Ciryl Gane
  - UFC.com Awards
    - 2009: Ranked #2 Loss of the Year vs. Matt Hamill, Ranked #10 Fighter of the Year, Ranked #9 Submission of the Year vs. Jake O'Brien & Ranked #4 Upset of the Year vs. Stephan Bonnar
    - 2011: Fighter of the Year & Ranked #7 Submission of the Year vs. Lyoto Machida
    - 2012: Ranked #2 Fighter of the Year
    - 2013: Fight of the Year vs. Alexander Gustafsson 1 & Ranked #10 Fighter of the Year
    - 2019: Top 10 Fighter of the Year
    - 2020: Ranked #9 Fight of the Year vs. Dominick Reyes
    - 2023: Ranked #4 Submission of the Year vs. Ciryl Gane & Ranked #10 Fighter of the Year
- United States Kickboxing Association
  - USKBA Light Heavyweight Championship (one time)
- Business Insider
  - 2012 #44 Ranked Most Dominant Athlete on the Planet
  - 2013 #39 Ranked Most Dominant Athlete Alive
  - 2014 #17 Ranked Most Dominant Athlete Alive
  - 2015 #18 Ranked Most Dominant Athlete Alive
  - 2015 Men's MMA Most Dominant Athlete
- Sherdog
  - 2009 Breakthrough Fighter of the Year
  - 2010 All-Violence 1st Team
  - 2011 All-Violence 1st Team
  - 2011 Beatdown of the Year vs Maurício Rua at UFC 128
  - 2011 Fighter of the Year
  - 2012 All-Violence 1st Team
  - 2013 All-Violence 1st Team
  - 2013 Fight of the Year vs Alexander Gustafsson at UFC 165
  - 2023 Comeback Fighter of the Year
  - 2010s Fighter of the Decade
  - Greatest Light Heavyweight of All Time
  - Greatest Male Fighter Pound-for-Pound of All Time
  - Mixed Martial Arts Hall of Fame
- World MMA Awards
  - 2010 Breakthrough Fighter of the Year
  - 2011 Fighter of the Year
  - 2012 Fighter of the Year
  - 2013 Fight of the Year vs. Alexander Gustafsson at UFC 165
- Combat Press
  - 2018 Biggest Story of the Year (Jon Jones and the Move of UFC 232)
  - 2023 Event of the Year (UFC 285)
- talkSPORT
  - Greatest UFC Fighter of All Time
- New York Post
  - 2023 Comeback Fighter of the Year
- BodySlam.net
  - 2024 Return of the Year
- MMA Mania
  - 2011 Fighter of the Year
  - 2012 #4 Ranked Fighter of the Year
  - 2013 #2 Ranked Fight of the Year vs. Alexander Gustafsson at UFC 165
  - 2019 #2 Ranked Event of the Year (UFC 239)
  - 2023 #5 Ranked Event of the Year (UFC 285)
- Inside MMA
  - 2011 Fighter of the Year Bazzie Award
- MMA Sucka
  - 2010s #4 Ranked Fighter of the Decade
  - Greatest MMA Fighter of All Time
- MMA Fighting
  - 2011 Fighter of the Year
  - 2013 Fighter of the Year Honorable Mention
  - 2013 Fight of the Year vs Alexander Gustafsson at UFC 165
  - 2017 Fight of the Year Honorable Mention vs. Daniel Cormier 2 at UFC 214
  - 2019 Fighter of the Year Honorable Mention
  - 2010s Fighter of the Decade
  - 2010s #3 Ranked Fight of the Decade vs. Alexander Gustafsson at UFC 165
  - #2 Ranked UFC Fighter of All Time (2018)
- MMA Insider
  - 2013 Fight of the Year vs Alexander Gustafsson at UFC 165
- Yardbarker
  - 2010s MMA Fighter of the Decade
  - Greatest MMA Fighter of All Time
- Fox Sports
  - 2013 Fight of the Year vs Alexander Gustafsson at UFC 165
- Yahoo! Sports
  - 2013 Fight of the Year vs. Alexander Gustafsson at UFC 165
  - 2010s #6 Ranked Story of the Decade
  - 2010s Male MMA Fighter of the Decade
  - Greatest MMA Fighter of All Time
- MMA Weekly
  - 2011 Fighter of the Year
  - 2013 Fight of the Year vs. Alexander Gustafsson at UFC 165
  - 2018 Comeback Fighter of the Year
  - 2010s MMA Fighter of the Decade
  - Greatest MMA Fighter of All Time
- MMA Junkie
  - 2011 Fighter of the Year
  - 2013 #7 Ranked Fighter of the Year tied with Georges St-Pierre and Ronda Rousey
  - 2013 Fight of the Year vs. Alexander Gustafsson at UFC 165
  - 2015 January Fight of the Month vs. Daniel Cormier at UFC 182
  - 2010s Top 20 MMA Fight Finishes of the Decade vs. Daniel Cormier 2 at UFC 214
  - 2010s MMA Fighter of the Decade
- Men's Journal
  - #3 Ranked UFC Fight of All Time vs. Alexander Gustafsson at UFC 165
- GiveMeSport
  - 2010s UFC Fighter of the Decade
  - Best Light Heavyweight Fighter in UFC History
  - Greatest UFC Fighter of All Time
- ClutchPoints
  - Best Light Heavyweight Fighter in UFC History
  - Greatest UFC Fighter of All Time
  - #12 Ranked Greatest Male Athlete of All Time
- Fight Matrix
  - 2008 Rookie of the Year
  - 2011 Male Fighter of the Year
  - 2012 #2 Ranked Male Fighter of the Year
  - 2023 Comeback Fighter of the Year
  - Greatest Light Heavyweight of All Time
  - #2 Ranked Fighter of All Time
- The Athletic
  - 2010s Light Heavyweight Fighter of the Decade
- CBS Sports
  - Greatest Light Heavyweight Fighter in MMA History
  - Greatest MMA Fighter of All Time
- Bleacher Report
  - 2011 Fighter of the Year
  - 2011 First-Team MMA All-Star
  - 2011 50 Best MMA Fights of the Year vs. Quinton Jackson at UFC 135 and Lyoto Machida at UFC 140
  - 2011 #2 Ranked Submission of the Year vs. Lyoto Machida at UFC 140
  - 2011 #5 Ranked Submission of the Mid-Year vs. Ryan Bader at UFC 126
  - 2012 #2 Ranked Fighter of the Year
  - 2013 Fighter of the Year Honorable Mention
  - 2013 Fight of the Year vs. Alexander Gustafsson at UFC 165
  - 2010s UFC Fighter of the Decade
- Sports Illustrated
  - 2011 #10 Ranked MMA Story of the Year
  - 2014 #9 Ranked Fittest Male Athlete
  - 2016 #4 Ranked Fittest Male Athlete
  - 2020 #7 Ranked Fittest Male Athlete
  - 2021 #5 Ranked Fittest Male Athlete
- ESPN
  - 2011 Fighter of the Year
  - 2011 #2 Ranked Submission of the Year vs. Lyoto Machida at UFC 140
  - 2012 #18 Ranked Athlete of the Year
  - 2012 Fighter of the Year
  - 2013 Fight of the Year vs. Alexander Gustafsson at UFC 165
  - 2010s Male MMA Fighter of the Decade
  - 2010s Top 3 Most Influential MMA Fighters of the Decade
  - 2010s Fight of the Decade vs. Alexander Gustafsson at UFC 165
  - Top 5 Fights in UFC's First 30 Years vs. Alexander Gustafsson at UFC 165
  - Top 5 Submissions in UFC's First 30 Years vs. Lyoto Machida at UFC 140
  - Top 100 Athletes of the 21st Century – #66
  - Greatest Men's MMA Fighter of the 21st Century
- Wrestling Observer Newsletter
  - 2023 Mixed Martial Arts Most Valuable
  - 2023 Best Box Office Draw
  - 2014 Feud of the Year vs. Daniel Cormier
  - 2011 Most Outstanding Fighter
- Spike Guys' Choice Awards
  - 2011 Most Dangerous Man
- FIGHT! Magazine
  - 2009 Newcomer of the Year
  - 2011 Fighter of the Year
- ESPY Awards
  - 2011 Nomination – Best Fighter ESPY Award
  - 2012 Nomination – Best Fighter ESPY Award
  - 2013 Nomination – Best Fighter ESPY Award
  - 2014 Nomination – Best Fighter ESPY Award
  - 2023 Nomination – Best Comeback Athlete ESPY Award
  - 2023 Best MMA Fighter ESPY Award
- MMA Viking
  - 2013 Fight of the Year vs. Alexander Gustafsson at UFC 165
- Bloody Elbow
  - 2009 #2 Ranked Breakout Fighter of the Year
  - 2010 #9 Ranked Fighter of the Year tied with Maurício Rua and Dominick Cruz
  - 2010 Breakout Fighter of the Year
  - 2011 (First half) Fighter of the Year
  - 2011 Fighter of the Year
  - 2013 Fight of the Year vs. Alexander Gustafsson at UFC 165
  - 2010s Light Heavyweight Fighter of the Decade
  - Greatest UFC Fighter of All Time
- WhatCulture
  - Greatest MMA Fighter of All Time
- Complex
  - 2011 Athlete of the Year Honorable Mention
  - #17 Ranked Greatest Brothers in Sports History together with Arthur and Chandler
- Code Sports
  - #6 Ranked UFC Fight of All Time vs. Alexander Gustafsson at UFC 165
- RotoWire
  - 2010s #2 Ranked Fight of the Decade vs. Alexander Gustafsson at UFC 165
- The Panther Press
  - Greatest MMA Fighter of All Time
- Sportsnaut
  - Best MMA Fighter of All Time
- New Arena
  - Greatest MMA Fighter of All Time
- NY Fights
  - Best Pound-for-Pound MMA Fighter of All Time
- LowKick MMA
  - 2013–2023 Top 5 UFC Fights of the Last 10 Years vs. Alexander Gustafsson at UFC 165
  - Best Light Heavyweight in UFC History
- Uncrowned
  - 2024 MMA All-Violence First Team
- Heavy Sports
  - 2011 Fighter of the Year
  - 2011 Submission of the Year Honorable Mentions vs. Ryan Bader at UFC 126 and Lyoto Machida at UFC 140
- Arizona Sports
  - 2013 Fight of the Year vs. Alexander Gustafsson at UFC 165
- Slacky Awards
  - 2014 Gameplan of the Year vs. Glover Teixeira at UFC 172
- BJPenn.com
  - 2010s #2 Ranked Fighter of the Decade
- Cageside Press
  - 2019 Event of the Year (UFC 239)

=== Amateur wrestling ===
- National Junior College Athletic Association
  - NJCAA 197 lb National Champion out of Iowa Central Community College (2006)
  - NJCAA All-American out of Iowa Central Community College (2006)
- National High School Coaches Association
  - NHSCA Senior All-American (2005)
- New York State Public High School Athletic Association
  - NYSPHSAA Division I State Championships representing Union-Endicott High School
    - 2004 (189 lb)
    - 2005 (189 lb)
  - Section IV Championships representing Union-Endicott High School
    - 2004 (189 lb)
    - 2005 (189 lb)
  - STAC Wrestling Championships representing Union-Endicott High School
    - 2004 (189 lb)
- USA Wrestling
  - Northeast Regional Junior Greco-Roman 189 lb Champion (2004)

=== Grappling ===
- Submission Underground (SUG) 2 Superfight Champion (2016)

== Mixed martial arts record ==
Professional record breakdown
30 matches	28 wins	1 loss
By knockout	11	0
By submission	7	0
By decision	10	0
By disqualification	0	1
No contests	1	

Res.	Record	Opponent	Method	Event	Date	Round	Time	Location	Notes
Win	28–1 (1)	Stipe Miocic	TKO (spinning back kick and punches)	UFC 309	November 16, 2024	3	4:29	New York City, New York, United States	Defended the UFC Heavyweight Championship. Broke the record for overall title defenses in UFC history (12). Performance of the Night. Later vacated title after deciding to retire.
Win	27–1 (1)	Ciryl Gane	Submission (guillotine choke)	UFC 285	March 4, 2023	1	2:04	Las Vegas, Nevada, United States	Heavyweight debut. Won the vacant UFC Heavyweight Championship. Performance of the Night.
Win	26–1 (1)	Dominick Reyes	Decision (unanimous)	UFC 247	February 8, 2020	5	5:00	Houston, Texas, United States	Defended the UFC Light Heavyweight Championship. Extended the record for overall UFC Light Heavyweight title defenses (11). Later vacated the title.
Win	25–1 (1)	Thiago Santos	Decision (split)	UFC 239	July 6, 2019	5	5:00	Las Vegas, Nevada, United States	Defended the UFC Light Heavyweight Championship.
Win	24–1 (1)	Anthony Smith	Decision (unanimous)	UFC 235	March 2, 2019	5	5:00	Las Vegas, Nevada, United States	Defended the UFC Light Heavyweight Championship. Jones was deducted two points in round 4 due to an illegal knee.
Win	23–1 (1)	Alexander Gustafsson	KO (punches)	UFC 232	December 29, 2018	3	2:02	Inglewood, California, United States	Won the vacant UFC Light Heavyweight Championship.
NC	22–1 (1)	Daniel Cormier	NC (overturned)	UFC 214	July 29, 2017	3	3:01	Anaheim, California, United States	For the UFC Light Heavyweight Championship. Performance of the Night. Originally a KO (head kick and punches) win for Jones; overturned and stripped of the title after he tested positive for a turinabol metabolite.
Win	22–1	Ovince Saint Preux	Decision (unanimous)	UFC 197	April 23, 2016	5	5:00	Las Vegas, Nevada, United States	Won the interim UFC Light Heavyweight Championship. Later stripped of the title after he tested positive for clomiphene and letrozole.
Win	21–1	Daniel Cormier	Decision (unanimous)	UFC 182	January 3, 2015	5	5:00	Las Vegas, Nevada, United States	Defended the UFC Light Heavyweight Championship. Extended the record for consecutive UFC Light Heavyweight title defenses (8). Fight of the Night. Later stripped of the title after he violated the UFC athlete conduct policy.
Win	20–1	Glover Teixeira	Decision (unanimous)	UFC 172	April 26, 2014	5	5:00	Baltimore, Maryland, United States	Defended the UFC Light Heavyweight Championship.
Win	19–1	Alexander Gustafsson	Decision (unanimous)	UFC 165	September 21, 2013	5	5:00	Toronto, Ontario, Canada	Defended the UFC Light Heavyweight Championship. Broke the record for the most consecutive UFC Light Heavyweight title defenses (6). Fight of the Night.
Win	18–1	Chael Sonnen	TKO (elbows and punches)	UFC 159	April 27, 2013	1	4:33	Newark, New Jersey, United States	Defended the UFC Light Heavyweight Championship.
Win	17–1	Vitor Belfort	Submission (keylock)	UFC 152	September 22, 2012	4	0:54	Toronto, Ontario, Canada	Defended the UFC Light Heavyweight Championship. Submission of the Night.
Win	16–1	Rashad Evans	Decision (unanimous)	UFC 145	April 21, 2012	5	5:00	Atlanta, Georgia, United States	Defended the UFC Light Heavyweight Championship.
Win	15–1	Lyoto Machida	Technical Submission (guillotine choke)	UFC 140	December 10, 2011	2	4:26	Toronto, Ontario, Canada	Defended the UFC Light Heavyweight Championship. Fight of the Night.
Win	14–1	Quinton Jackson	Submission (rear-naked choke)	UFC 135	September 24, 2011	4	1:14	Denver, Colorado, United States	Defended the UFC Light Heavyweight Championship. Fight of the Night.
Win	13–1	Maurício Rua	TKO (punches and knees)	UFC 128	March 19, 2011	3	2:37	Newark, New Jersey, United States	Won the UFC Light Heavyweight Championship.
Win	12–1	Ryan Bader	Submission (guillotine choke)	UFC 126	February 5, 2011	2	4:20	Las Vegas, Nevada, United States	Submission of the Night.
Win	11–1	Vladimir Matyushenko	TKO (elbows)	UFC Live: Jones vs. Matyushenko	August 1, 2010	1	1:52	San Diego, California, United States	
Win	10–1	Brandon Vera	TKO (elbows and punches)	UFC Live: Vera vs. Jones	March 21, 2010	1	3:19	Broomfield, Colorado, United States	Knockout of the Night.
Loss	9–1	Matt Hamill	DQ (illegal elbows)	The Ultimate Fighter: Heavyweights Finale	December 5, 2009	1	4:14	Las Vegas, Nevada, United States	
Win	9–0	Jake O'Brien	Submission (guillotine choke)	UFC 100	July 11, 2009	2	2:43	Las Vegas, Nevada, United States	
Win	8–0	Stephan Bonnar	Decision (unanimous)	UFC 94	January 31, 2009	3	5:00	Las Vegas, Nevada, United States	
Win	7–0	André Gusmão	Decision (unanimous)	UFC 87	August 9, 2008	3	5:00	Minneapolis, Minnesota, United States	
Win	6–0	Moyses Gabin	TKO (punches)	Battle Cage Xtreme 5	July 12, 2008	2	1:58	Atlantic City, New Jersey, United States	Won the USKBA Light Heavyweight Championship.
Win	5–0	Parker Porter	KO (punch)	World Championship Fighting 3	June 20, 2008	1	0:36	Wilmington, Massachusetts, United States	
Win	4–0	Ryan Verrett	TKO (punches)	United States Fight League: War in the Woods 3	May 9, 2008	1	0:14	Ledyard, Connecticut, United States	
Win	3–0	Anthony Pina	Submission (guillotine choke)	ICE Fighter	April 25, 2008	1	1:15	Worcester, Massachusetts, United States	
Win	2–0	Carlos Eduardo	KO (punches)	Battle Cage Xtreme 4	April 19, 2008	3	0:24	Atlantic City, New Jersey, United States	Light Heavyweight debut.
Win	1–0	Brad Bernard	TKO (punches)	Full Force Productions: Untamed 20	April 12, 2008	1	1:32	Boxborough, Massachusetts, United States	Catchweight (210 lb) bout.

== Grappling record ==
5 Matches, 5 Wins (5 Submissions)
Result	Rec.	Opponent	Method	Event	Division	Date	Location
Win	5–0	(United States) Dan Henderson	Submission (arm-triangle choke)	Submission Underground 2	Superfight	December 10, 2016	(United States) Portland, OR
Win	4–0	(United States) Rich O'Toole	Submission (guillotine choke)	NAGA Phoenix	Absolute	October 15, 2016	(United States) Phoenix, AZ
Win	3–0	(United States) Don Daubert	Submission (guillotine choke)	NAGA Phoenix	Absolute	October 15, 2016	(United States) Phoenix, AZ
Win	2–0	(United States) Doug Fournet	Submission (kimura)	Northeastern Grappler's Challenge	Absolute	January, 2008	(United States) Ithaca, NY
Win	1–0	(United States) Doug Fournet	Submission (kimura)	Northeastern Grappler's Challenge	Absolute	January, 2008	(United States) Ithaca, NY

== Pay-per-view bouts ==
No.	Event	Fight	Date	Venue	City	PPV Buys
1.	UFC 128	Shogun vs. Jones	March 19, 2011	Prudential Center	Newark, New Jersey, U.S	445,000
2.	UFC 135	Jones vs. Rampage	September 24, 2011	Pepsi Center	Denver, Colorado, U.S	520,000
3.	UFC 140	Jones vs. Machida	December 10, 2011	Air Canada Centre	Toronto, Ontario, Canada	485,000
4.	UFC 145	Jones vs. Evans	April 21, 2012	Philips Arena	Atlanta, Georgia, U.S	700,000
5.	UFC 152	Jones vs. Belfort	September 22, 2012	Air Canada Centre	Toronto, Ontario, Canada	450,000
6.	UFC 159	Jones vs. Sonnen	April 27, 2013	Prudential Center	Newark, New Jersey, U.S	530,000
7.	UFC 165	Jones vs. Gustafsson	September 21, 2013	Air Canada Centre	Toronto, Ontario, Canada	310,000
8.	UFC 172	Jones vs. Teixeira	April 26, 2014	Royal Farms Arena	Baltimore, Maryland, U.S.	350,000
9.	UFC 182	Jones vs. Cormier	January 3, 2015	MGM Grand Garden Arena	Las Vegas, Nevada, U.S.	800,000
10.	UFC 197	Jones vs. Saint Preux	April 23, 2016	MGM Grand Garden Arena	Las Vegas, Nevada, U.S.	322,000
11.	UFC 214	Cormier vs. Jones 2	July 29, 2017	Honda Center	Anaheim, California, U.S.	860,000
12.	UFC 232	Jones vs. Gustafsson 2	December 29, 2018	The Forum	Inglewood, California, U.S.	700,000
13.	UFC 235	Jones vs. Smith	March 2, 2019	T-Mobile Arena	Las Vegas, Nevada, U.S.	650,000
14.	UFC 239	Jones vs. Santos	July 6, 2019	T-Mobile Arena	Las Vegas, Nevada, U.S.	Not Disclosed
15.	UFC 247	Jones vs. Reyes	February 8, 2020	Toyota Center	Houston, Texas, U.S.	Not Disclosed
16.	UFC 285	Jones vs. Gane	March 4, 2023	T-Mobile Arena	Las Vegas, Nevada, U.S.	1,000,000
17.	UFC 309	Jones vs. Miocic	November 16, 2024	Madison Square Garden	New York City, New York, U.S.	800,000
Total sales						8,922,000 (Note: PPV buys for two events (UFC 239 and UFC 247) were not disclosed.)

== Filmography ==
=== Television and film ===
Air Date	Title	Role	Notes	Ref.
March 18, 2011	UFC Presents Jon Jones: In The Moment	Himself	Spike TV exclusive	
March 24, 2011	The Tonight Show with Jay Leno	Himself	Special guest - 1 episode	
May 16, 2011	New York Mixed Martial Arts	Himself	Documentary	
July 23, 2011	Kenny Powers - The K-Swiss MFCEO	Himself	K-Swiss Ad - Cameo	
April 11, 2012	UFC Ultimate Insider: Jones vs Evans	Himself	Promotional episode on Fuel TV	
January 22–April 13, 2013	The Ultimate Fighter: Team Jones vs Team Sonnen	Himself	UFC reality series	
September 16, 2014	Fight Church	Himself	Documentary	
July 3, 2016	UFC 200 Greatest Fighters of All Time	Himself	Featured in final episode	
July 1, 2016	UFC 200: Counterpunch - Cormier vs Jones 2	Himself	Promotional episode on Fox Sports 1	
September 29, 2016	The Hurt Business	Himself	Documentary	
August 7, 2017	Good Morning America	Himself	Special guest - 1 episode	
November 26, 2018	First Take	Himself	Special guest	
February 26, 2019	The Best Of Jon Jones	Himself	ESPN - fight highlights	
February 27–March 3, 2023	UFC 285 Embedded	Himself	Promotional short series	
November 8, 2024	La Cage	Himself	Netflix series	
January 5, 2025	Edo's Crossing	Navy SEAL	Short film	
October 17, 2025 – January 4, 2026	ALF Reality 2: Jones vs. Masvidal	Himself	Coach on MMA reality show	

=== Documentaries and interviews ===
Air Date	Title	Notes	Ref
November 24, 2015	Jon Jones Breaks Silence on Accident, Suspension, Return to UFC and More	MMA Fighting exclusive interview with Ariel Helwani	
July 28, 2017	Jon Jones UFC 182 Interview Prior to First Daniel Cormier Fight	MMA Fighting exclusive interview with Ariel Helwani	
May 28, 2022	Before and After Fighting Jon Jones	Motivedia MMA digital film	
March 3, 2023	Jon Jones - The Greatest Fighter of All Time	VoteSport documentary	
July 1, 2023	Why Champions Self-Destruct: the Jon Jones Story	Short film by Patrick Gavia	
November 8–12, 2024	Jon Jones Sits Down with ESPN Ahead of UFC 309	ESPN MMA exclusive interview	
December 6, 2024	UFC's Most Controversial "GOAT": Jon Jones	Documentary film by Lionel Rivera	

UFC Video games
Year	Title	Notes
2010	UFC Undisputed 2010	
2011	UFC Personal Trainer	
2012	UFC Undisputed 3	
2014	EA Sports UFC	Cover Athlete
2016	EA Sports UFC 2	
2018	EA Sports UFC 3	
2020	EA Sports UFC 4	
2023	EA Sports UFC 5	

== See also ==
- Double champions in MMA
- List of male mixed martial artists
- List of UFC bonus award recipients
- List of UFC champions
- List of UFC events
- List of UFC records
- UFC Hall of Fame
- UFC Rankings

== Notes and references ==
=== References ===
Achievements
Preceded by Maurício Rua	12th UFC Light Heavyweight Champion; March 20, 2011 – April 28, 2015; Stripped	Vacant Title next held by Daniel Cormier
Vacant Title last held by Randy Couture	2nd UFC Interim Light Heavyweight Champion; April 23, 2016 – November 9, 2016; Stripped	Vacant
Vacant Title last held by Daniel Cormier	14th UFC Light Heavyweight Champion; December 29, 2018 – August 17, 2020	Vacant Title next held by Jan Błachowicz
Preceded by Francis Ngannou; Stripped	23rd UFC Heavyweight Champion; March 4, 2023 – June 21, 2025	Vacant Title next held by Tom Aspinall; Promoted
Awards
Preceded by Brock Lesnar	World MMA Breakthrough Fighter of the Year; 2010	Succeeded by Donald Cerrone
Preceded by José Aldo	World MMA Fighter of the Year; 2011, 2012	Succeeded by Chris Weidman
Preceded by Joe Lauzon vs. Jamie Varner	World MMA Fight of the Year; 2013 vs. Alexander Gustafsson at UFC 165	Succeeded by José Aldo vs. Chad Mendes
Preceded by Charles Oliveira	Best MMA Fighter ESPY Award; 2023	Succeeded by Sean O'Malley
UFC records
Preceded by José Aldo; November 20, 2010 – March 19, 2011; 24 years, 72 days	Youngest Champion; March 19, 2011 – present 23 years, 243 days	Incumbent
Preceded by Anderson Silva; February 5, 2013 – December 12, 2013; 155 days	Longest combined pound-for-pound reign December 12, 2013 – present 1,743 days	Incumbent
Preceded by Georges St-Pierre; November 17, 2012 – February 8, 2020; 13	Most title wins February 8, 2020 – present 16	Incumbent
Preceded by Demetrious Johnson; April 15, 2017 – November 16, 2024; 11	Most title defenses November 16, 2024 – present 12	Incumbent
Preceded by Amanda Nunes; July 30, 2022 – November 16, 2024; 8	Most UFC champions defeated November 16, 2024 – present 9	Incumbent
