= UFC 165 =

UFC mixed martial arts event in 2013

UFC 165: Jones vs. Gustafsson
- The poster for UFC 165: Jones vs. Gustafsson
- Promotion: Ultimate Fighting Championship
- Date: September 21, 2013
- Venue: Air Canada Centre
- City: Toronto, Ontario, Canada
- Attendance: 15,504
- Total gate: $1.9 million

Event chronology
UFC Fight Night: Teixeira vs. Bader	UFC 165: Jones vs. Gustafsson	UFC Fight Night: Maia vs. Shields

UFC 165: Jones vs. Gustafsson was a mixed martial arts event held on September 21, 2013, at the Air Canada Centre in Toronto, Ontario, Canada. The main event was inducted into the UFC Hall of Fame's Fight Wing in 2021.

== Background ==
The main event featured a UFC Light Heavyweight Championship bout between current champion Jon Jones and Alexander Gustafsson. Gustafsson earned his title fight by winning six straight fights in the light heavyweight division. Additionally, Jones was looking to surpass the number of Light Heavyweight title defenses originally set by Tito Ortiz.

Co-featured on the card was a rescheduled Interim Bantamweight Championship bout between the current champion Renan Barão, and former WEC Bantamweight Champion and top contender Eddie Wineland. The pairing was first planned as the headliner at UFC 161, but was removed from that event after Barão injured his foot.

Mark Bocek was expected to face Michel Prazeres at this event. However, Bocek pulled out due to an injury and was replaced by UFC newcomer Jesse Ronson.

Norifumi Yamamoto was expected to face Ivan Menjivar at the event. However, Yamamoto was removed from the bout and was replaced by Wilson Reis.

The event also aired October 17, 2013, on Fox Sports 1 less than a month after it took place as part of a special UFC Reloaded.

== Results ==
Main card
Weight class				Method	Round	Time	Notes
Light Heavyweight	Jon Jones (c)	def.	Alexander Gustafsson	Decision (unanimous) (48–47, 48–47, 49–46)	5	5:00	(Note: For the UFC Light Heavyweight Championship.)
Bantamweight	Renan Barão (ic)	def.	Eddie Wineland	TKO (spinning back kick and punches)	2	0:35	(Note: For the interim UFC Bantamweight Championship.)
Heavyweight	Brendan Schaub	def.	Matt Mitrione	Technical Submission (D'Arce choke)	1	4:06
Middleweight	Francis Carmont	def.	Costas Philippou	Decision (unanimous) (30–27, 30–27, 30–26)	3	5:00
Lightweight	Khabib Nurmagomedov	def.	Pat Healy	Decision (unanimous) (30–27, 30–27, 30–27)	3	5:00
Preliminary card (Fox Sports 1)
Lightweight	Myles Jury	def.	Mike Ricci	Decision (split) (29–28, 28–29, 29–28)	3	5:00
Bantamweight	Wilson Reis	def.	Ivan Menjivar	Decision (unanimous) (29–28, 29–28, 29–28)	3	5:00
Welterweight	Stephen Thompson	def.	Chris Clements	KO (punches)	2	1:27
Bantamweight	Mitch Gagnon	def.	Dustin Kimura	Technical Submission (guillotine choke)	1	4:05
Preliminary card (Facebook/Youtube)
Lightweight	John Makdessi	def.	Renée Forte	KO (punches)	1	2:01
Lightweight	Michel Prazeres	def.	Jesse Ronson	Decision (split) (28–29, 29–28, 29–28)	3	5:00
Bantamweight	Alex Caceres	def.	Roland Delorme	Decision (split) (29–28, 28–29, 29–28)	3	5:00
Heavyweight	Daniel Omielańczuk	def.	Nandor Guelmino	KO (punch)	3	3:18

== Bonus awards ==
The following fighters received $50,000 bonuses.

- Fight of The Night: Jon Jones vs. Alexander Gustafsson
- Knockout of The Night: Renan Barão
- Submission of the Night: Mitch Gagnon

== See also ==
- List of UFC events
- 2013 in UFC
