= Chad Mendes =

American mixed martial arts fighter

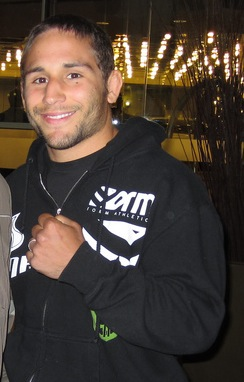
- Chad Mendes in 2011
- Born: Chad Eduardo Mendes; May 1, 1985 (age 41); Hanford, California, U.S.
- Nickname: Money
- Height: 5 ft 6 in (1.68 m)
- Weight: 145 lb (66 kg; 10 st 5 lb)
- Division: Featherweight
- Reach: 66 in (168 cm)
- Style: Wrestling
- Stance: Orthodox
- Fighting out of: Sacramento, California, U.S.
- Team: Team Alpha Male
- Wrestling: NCAA Division I Wrestling
- Years active: 2005–2008 (Collegiate wrestling); 2008–2018 (MMA); 2022–present (bare-knuckle boxing)

Mixed martial arts record
- Total: 23
- Wins: 18
- By knockout: 8
- By submission: 2
- By decision: 8
- Losses: 5
- By knockout: 4
- By decision: 1

Other information
- University: California Polytechnic State University
- Notable school: Hanford High School
- Website: finzandfeatherz.com
- Mixed martial arts record from Sherdog

Chad Eduardo Mendes (born May 1, 1985) is an American professional bare-knuckle boxer, and former mixed martial artist and collegiate wrestler who is currently signed to Bare Knuckle Fighting Championship (BKFC). He gained notoriety competing in the featherweight division of the Ultimate Fighting Championship (UFC), where he was a three-time UFC championship challenger, and had also competed in the World Extreme Cagefighting (WEC).

Having competed in collegiate wrestling as a Cal Poly Mustang, Mendes was a two-time NCAA Division I All-American and a Pac-10 Conference champion.

== Wrestling career ==
=== NCAA ===
Mendes wrestled for California Polytechnic State University (Cal Poly) in San Luis Obispo, California. He finished his career with an overall record of 64–14 and twice earned NCAA All-American honors at 125 pounds as a sophomore, then 141 pounds as a senior. As a senior, Mendes finished the year with a 30–1 record; he placed 2nd in the 2008 NCAA championships at 141 lb., falling to Ohio State's J Jaggers in the title match. That year, Mendes was Pac-10 Wrestler of the Year.

== Mixed martial arts career ==
=== Early career ===
After the conclusion of his collegiate career, Mendes began to train in mixed martial arts with Team Alpha Male. He began fighting for the Palace Fighting Championship and went undefeated.

=== World Extreme Cagefighting ===
Mendes made his WEC debut against Erik Koch on March 6, 2010 at WEC 47. He won the fight via unanimous decision, despite a cut over his right eye that was examined during the fight to see if he could continue.

Mendes faced Anthony Morrison, replacing an injured Mackens Semerzier, on April 24, 2010 at WEC 48. He won the bout via first round submission.

Mendes faced Cub Swanson on August 18, 2010 at WEC 50. He won the fight via unanimous decision (30–27, 29–28, and 29–28).

Mendes faced Javier Vazquez on November 11, 2010 at WEC 52 and defeated him via unanimous decision. Mendes was able to utilize his improved striking to complement his superior wrestling to dictate where he wanted to take the action. During the fight, Mendes used an unorthodox move when he front flipped on Vazquez who was on the ground, to land on him.

=== Ultimate Fighting Championship ===
On October 28, 2010, World Extreme Cagefighting merged with the Ultimate Fighting Championship. As part of the merger, all WEC fighters were transferred to the UFC.

Mendes made his UFC debut against returning veteran and judo black belt Michihiro Omigawa on February 5, 2011 at UFC 126. He won the fight via unanimous decision.

Following UFC 129, Dana White mentioned in the post-fight press conference that Mendes may have a shot at the title against UFC featherweight champion José Aldo. Although the two were expected to fight on August 6, 2011 at UFC 133, Aldo would be sidelined until October recovering from various injuries sustained during his fight with Mark Hominick. Mendes instead faced Rani Yahya at the event. He won the fight via unanimous decision.

Mendes fought UFC Featherweight Champion José Aldo on January 14, 2012 at UFC 142, losing at 4:59 of the first round via KO, giving Mendes his first professional loss.

Mendes next faced Cody McKenzie on July 7, 2012 at UFC 148. He won the fight via first-round TKO due to a body punch.

Mendes was expected to face Hacran Dias on December 15, 2012 at UFC on FX 6. However, in just days before the event, Dias pulled out of the bout, citing a shoulder injury, and he was replaced by promotional newcomer Yaotzin Meza. Mendes defeated Meza via KO at 3:38 in the first round.

Mendes was expected to face Manvel Gamburyan on February 23, 2013 at UFC 157. However, Gamburyan pulled out of the bout, citing a thumb injury. Subsequently, Mendes was pulled from the card as a suitable replacement could not be found on short notice.

Mendes was expected to face Clay Guida on April 20, 2013 at UFC on Fox 7. However, it was revealed on March 15 that Guida had pulled out of the bout, citing an injury, and he was replaced by Darren Elkins. Mendes won the fight by TKO at 1:08 in the first round.

A rescheduled bout with Guida took place on August 31, 2013 at UFC 164. After a close first and second round, Mendes finished Guida via TKO by punches in the third round and became the first man to ever finish Guida by strikes. The win also earned Mendes his first Knockout of the Night bonus award.

Mendes faced Nik Lentz on December 14, 2013 at UFC on Fox 9. He won the fight via unanimous decision.

A rematch with José Aldo was expected to take place on August 2, 2014, as the event headliner at UFC 176 for the UFC Featherweight Championship. However, in early July, Aldo pulled out of the bout with an injury. The rematch with Aldo was subsequently rescheduled and took place on October 25, 2014, at UFC 179. He became the first man to knock down Aldo dropping him with a left hand in the first round. Mendes and Aldo both rocked each other with clean punches, Mendes would go on to lose the fight via unanimous decision. Despite the loss on the scorecards, Mendes was awarded his first Fight of the Night bonus award for the bout. The fight won World MMA Awards 2015 fight of the year award.

Mendes faced Ricardo Lamas on April 4, 2015 in the main event at UFC Fight Night 63. Mendes won the fight via TKO in the first round. The win also earned Mendes his first Performance of the Night bonus award.

On May 18, 2015, Dana White tweeted that Chad Mendes had agreed to an eight-fight contract with UFC.

José Aldo was expected to face Conor McGregor on July 11, 2015 at UFC 189 for the undisputed UFC Featherweight Championship. However, in the days leading up to the fight, Aldo pulled out of the bout because of a rib injury he sustained in training. Mendes stepped in as a short notice replacement to face McGregor for the interim championship. Mendes lost the fight via TKO in the second round.

Mendes faced Frankie Edgar on December 11, 2015 at The Ultimate Fighter 22 Finale. He lost the fight via knockout in the first round.

After returning from his suspension and two-and-a-half years away from the sport, Mendes faced Myles Jury on July 14, 2018 at UFC Fight Night 133. He won the fight via TKO in the first round. This win earned him the Performance of the Night award.

Mendes faced Alexander Volkanovski on December 29, 2018 at UFC 232. He lost the fight via TKO in the second round. This fight earned both participants Fight of the Night honors. Following the loss, Mendes announced his retirement from the sport.

=== Global Fight League ===
Mendes was scheduled to come out of retirement to face Maike Linhares in the inaugural Global Fight League event on May 24, 2025 at GFL 1. However, all GFL events were cancelled indefinitely.

== Bare-knuckle boxing career ==
=== Bare Knuckle Fighting Championship ===
On August 4, 2021, Mendes announced that he was released from his UFC contract by his own request and signed a multi-fight contract with Bare Knuckle Fighting Championship. However, he later reiterated that he was still under contract with the UFC, but was given exemption to compete in bare-knuckle. He was initially expected to make his debut at a BKFC event on October 22, 2021, but that was postponed on two occasions. He debuted on February 19, 2022 at BKFC KnuckleMania 2 defeating Joshuah Alvarez by technical knockout.

On April 29, 2023, Mendes faced Eddie Alvarez at BKFC 41 and lost by split decision. He announced his retirement from combat sports after the bout. This fight earned him the Fight of the Night award.

== Doping violations and suspension ==
On June 10, 2016, the UFC announced that Mendes had been informed of a potential doping violation stemming from an out-of-competition test conducted by USADA. Mendes responded, "I didn't do my homework and that was a big mistake. I own it and I'm going to pay for it." He claims the cause was from a topical cream used to treat his psoriasis, however, on July 20, 2016, USADA reported that Mendes tested positive for GHRP-6, a growth hormone release stimulator, and suspended Mendes for 2 years. He was not eligible to compete again until June 10, 2018.

== Submission grappling ==
Mendes competed in Submission Underground 3 on January 30, 2017, where he defeated Brazilian jiu-jitsu world champion and 27 time Grapplers Quest champion, Jeff Glover in overtime.

Mendes was scheduled to face Kevin Lee at ADXC 5 on August 3, 2024. Lee was replaced by Diego Brandão on short notice, and Mendes won the match by decision.

== Personal life ==
Mendes graduated from California Polytechnic State University with a degree in engineering. He is of Portuguese, Italian, Puerto Rican, Irish, and Native American descent.

Mendes' nickname, "Money", is shortened from his initial nickname, "Money Shot", the latter of which was suggested by training partner Urijah Faber. When asked how he got the nickname, Mendes stated that during his early days of MMA training right after graduating college, he had no knowledge of stand-up fighting, and one time, when he went for a takedown after taking a punch from one his training partners, they would claim that his "shot is money", hence the nickname stuck. It was after signing a sponsorship deal with Pepsi and joining the WEC that the nickname was shortened to "Money", as his initial one was deemed too vulgar for television.

Outside of combat sports, Mendes is the founder of hunting and fishing guide service Finz and Featherz, which has been attributed to his love for hunting and fishing, having grown up in the countryside.

In 2019, Mendes and his wife Abby welcomed a daughter.

=== Legal issues ===
Mendes was charged with battery for his alleged involvement in a bar fight on July 29, 2012 in his hometown of Hanford, California. The Kings County District Attorney's Office announced on August 25, 2012, that it would seek a battery charge against Mendes. The charges were dropped after Mendes pleaded no contest to a count of public disturbance and paid a fine.

== Championships and accomplishments ==
=== Mixed martial arts ===
- Ultimate Fighting Championship
  - Knockout of the Night (One time) vs. Clay Guida
  - Fight of the Night (Two times) vs. José Aldo 2 and Alexander Volkanovski
  - Performance of the Night (Two times) vs. Ricardo Lamas and Myles Jury
  - Tied (Conor McGregor & Choi Doo-ho) for third most knockouts in UFC Featherweight division history (6)
  - UFC.com Awards
    - 2011: Ranked #9 Import of the Year
    - 2014: Ranked #2 Fight of the Year vs. José Aldo 2
- World MMA Awards
  - 2014 Fight of the Year vs. José Aldo 2 at UFC 179
- ESPN
  - 2014 Fight of the Year vs. José Aldo 2 at UFC 179
- Bloody Elbow
  - 2014 Fight of the Year vs. José Aldo 2 at UFC 179
- MMA Junkie
  - 2014 Fight of the Year vs. José Aldo 2 at UFC 179
  - 2014 October Fight of the Month vs. José Aldo 2
- Bleacher Report
  - 2013 #9 Ranked Fighter of the Year
  - 2014 #2 Ranked Fight of the Year vs. José Aldo 2 at UFC 179
- Yahoo Sports
  - 2014 #2 Ranked Fight of the Year vs. José Aldo 2 at UFC 179

=== Collegiate wrestling ===
- National Collegiate Athletic Association
  - NCAA Division I All-American (2006, 2008)
  - Pac-10 Conference Championship (2008)
  - Pac-10 Conference Wrestler of the Year (2008)
  - NCAA Division I 125 lb: 6th place out of Cal Poly (2006)
  - NCAA Division I 141 lb: Runner-up out of Cal Poly (2008)

=== Bare-knuckle boxing ===
- Bare Knuckle Fighting Championship
  - Fight of the Night (One time) vs. Eddie Alvarez
  - Fight of the Year (2023) (vs. Eddie Alvarez)

== Mixed martial arts record ==
Professional record breakdown
23 matches	18 wins	5 losses
By knockout	8	4
By submission	2	0
By decision	8	1

Res.	Record	Opponent	Method	Event	Date	Round	Time	Location	Notes
Loss	18–5	Alexander Volkanovski	TKO (punches)	UFC 232	December 29, 2018	2	4:14	Inglewood, California, United States	Fight of the Night.
Win	18–4	Myles Jury	TKO (punches)	UFC Fight Night: dos Santos vs. Ivanov	July 14, 2018	1	2:51	Boise, Idaho, United States	Performance of the Night.
Loss	17–4	Frankie Edgar	KO (punch)	The Ultimate Fighter: Team McGregor vs. Team Faber Finale	December 11, 2015	1	2:28	Las Vegas, Nevada, United States	
Loss	17–3	Conor McGregor	TKO (punches)	UFC 189	July 11, 2015	2	4:57	Las Vegas, Nevada, United States	For the interim UFC Featherweight Championship.
Win	17–2	Ricardo Lamas	TKO (punches)	UFC Fight Night: Mendes vs. Lamas	April 4, 2015	1	2:45	Fairfax, Virginia, United States	Performance of the Night.
Loss	16–2	José Aldo	Decision (unanimous)	UFC 179	October 25, 2014	5	5:00	Rio de Janeiro, Brazil	For the UFC Featherweight Championship. Fight of the Night.
Win	16–1	Nik Lentz	Decision (unanimous)	UFC on Fox: Johnson vs. Benavidez 2	December 14, 2013	3	5:00	Sacramento, California, United States	
Win	15–1	Clay Guida	TKO (punches)	UFC 164	August 31, 2013	3	0:30	Milwaukee, Wisconsin, United States	Knockout of the Night.
Win	14–1	Darren Elkins	KO (punches)	UFC on Fox: Henderson vs. Melendez	April 20, 2013	1	1:08	San Jose, California, United States	
Win	13–1	Yaotzin Meza	KO (punches)	UFC on FX: Sotiropoulos vs. Pearson	December 15, 2012	1	1:55	Gold Coast, Australia	
Win	12–1	Cody McKenzie	KO (punch to the body)	UFC 148	July 7, 2012	1	0:31	Las Vegas, Nevada, United States	
Loss	11–1	José Aldo	KO (knee)	UFC 142	January 14, 2012	1	4:59	Rio de Janeiro, Brazil	For the UFC Featherweight Championship.
Win	11–0	Rani Yahya	Decision (unanimous)	UFC 133	August 6, 2011	3	5:00	Philadelphia, Pennsylvania, United States	
Win	10–0	Michihiro Omigawa	Decision (unanimous)	UFC 126	February 5, 2011	3	5:00	Las Vegas, Nevada, United States	
Win	9–0	Javier Vazquez	Decision (unanimous)	WEC 52	November 11, 2010	3	5:00	Las Vegas, Nevada, United States	
Win	8–0	Cub Swanson	Decision (unanimous)	WEC 50	August 18, 2010	3	5:00	Las Vegas, Nevada, United States	
Win	7–0	Anthony Morrison	Submission (guillotine choke)	WEC 48	April 24, 2010	1	2:13	Sacramento, California, United States	
Win	6–0	Erik Koch	Decision (unanimous)	WEC 47	March 6, 2010	3	5:00	Columbus, Ohio, United States	
Win	5–0	Mike Joy	Decision (unanimous)	Tachi Palace Fights 1	October 8, 2009	3	5:00	Lemoore, California, United States	
Win	4–0	Steven Siler	KO (punches)	TPF: Best of Both Worlds	July 16, 2009	1	0:44	Lemoore, California, United States	
Win	3–0	Art Arciniega	Decision (unanimous)	PFC: Best of Both Worlds 2	April 23, 2009	3	3:00	Lemoore, California, United States	
Win	2–0	Leland Gridley	TKO (punches)	PFC: Best of Both Worlds	February 6, 2009	2	1:58	Lemoore, California, United States	
Win	1–0	Giovanni Encarnacion	Submission (rear-naked choke)	PFC 10: Explosive	September 26, 2008	1	2:06	Lemoore, California, United States	

== Pay-per-view bouts ==
No.	Event	Fight	Date	Venue	City	PPV Buys
1.	UFC 142	Aldo vs. Mendes	January 14, 2012	Jeunesse Arena	Rio de Janeiro, Brazil	235,000
2.	UFC 179	Aldo vs. Mendes 2	October 25, 2014	Ginásio do Maracanãzinho	Rio de Janeiro, Brazil	180,000
3.	UFC 189	Mendes vs. McGregor	July 11, 2015	MGM Grand Garden Arena	Las Vegas, Nevada, United States	825,000

== Bare knuckle record ==
Professional record breakdown
2 matches	1 win	1 loss
By knockout	1	0
By decision	0	1

Res.	Record	Opponent	Method	Event	Date	Round	Time	Location	Notes
Loss	1–1	Eddie Alvarez	Decision (split)	BKFC 41	April 29, 2023	5	2:00	Broomfield, Colorado, United States	Welterweight (165lb) bout. Fight of the Night. Fight of the Year.
Win	1–0	Joshuah Alvarez	TKO (punches)	BKFC KnuckleMania 2	February 19, 2022	4	1:34	Hollywood, Florida, United States	Lightweight debut.

== NCAA record ==
NCAA Championships Matches
Res.	Record	Opponent	Score	Date	Event
2008 NCAA Championships (silver) at 141 lbs
Loss	10-5	J Jaggers	2-5	March 22, 2008	2008 NCAA Division I Wrestling Championships
Win	10-4	Nathan Morgan	1-0	March 22, 2008	2008 NCAA Division I Wrestling Championships
Win	9-4	Nick Gallick	5-0	March 22, 2008	2008 NCAA Division I Wrestling Championships
Win	8-4	Ryan Williams	7-4	March 22, 2008	2008 NCAA Division I Wrestling Championships
Win	7-4	Steve Adamcsik	Fall	March 22, 2008	2008 NCAA Division I Wrestling Championships
2006 NCAA Championships 6th at 125 lbs
Loss	6-4	Sam Hazewinkel	1-7	March 17, 2006	2006 NCAA Division I Wrestling Championships
Win	6-3	John Velez	7-4	March 17, 2006	2006 NCAA Division I Wrestling Championships
Win	5-3	Kyle Ott	Fall	March 17, 2006	2006 NCAA Division I Wrestling Championships
Loss	4-3	Nick Simmons	Fall	March 17, 2006	2006 NCAA Division I Wrestling Championships
Win	4-2	Chad Sportelli	3-2	March 17, 2006	2006 NCAA Division I Wrestling Championships
Win	3-2	Brad Gentzle	Fall	March 17, 2006	2006 NCAA Division I Wrestling Championships
2005 NCAA Championships at 133 lbs
Loss	2-2	Mark Jayne	6-7	March 18, 2005	2005 NCAA Division I Wrestling Championships
Loss	2-1	Mack Reiter	3-8	March 18, 2005	2005 NCAA Division I Wrestling Championships
Win	2-0	Matt Ciasulli	6-4	March 18, 2005	2005 NCAA Division I Wrestling Championships
Win	1-0	Evan Sola	Fall	March 18, 2005	2005 NCAA Division I Wrestling Championships

== See also ==
- List of current UFC fighters
- List of male mixed martial artists
