= José Aldo =

Brazilian mixed martial artist (born 1986)

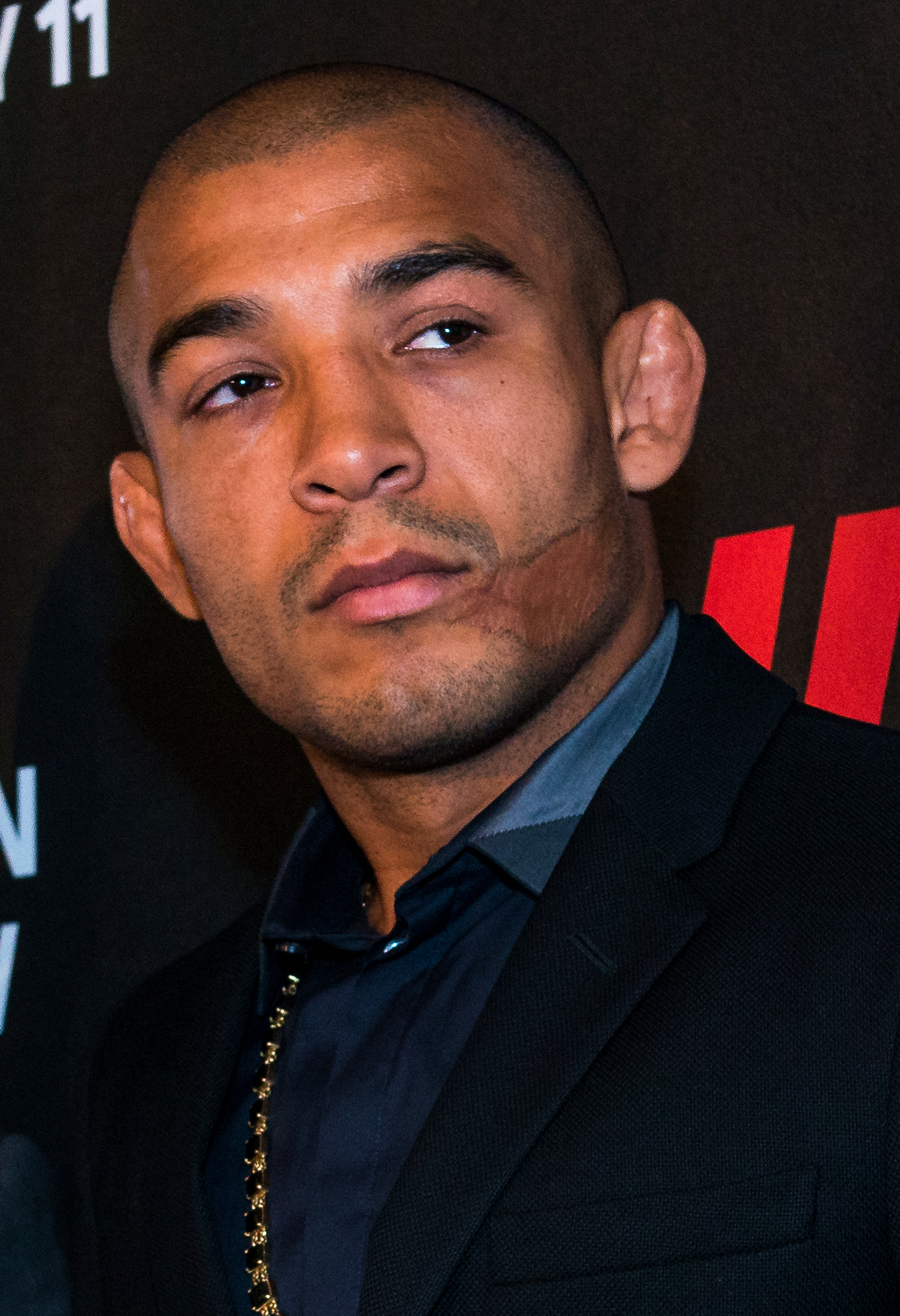
- Aldo in 2015
- Born: José Aldo da Silva Oliveira Júnior; 9 September 1986 (age 40); Manaus, Amazonas, Brazil
- Nickname: Junior
- Height: 5 ft 7 in (170 cm)
- Weight: 143 lb (65 kg; 10 st 3 lb)
- Division: Bantamweight (2019–2022, 2024); Featherweight (2004–2019, 2025); Lightweight (2005)
- Reach: 70 in (178 cm)
- Stance: Orthodox
- Fighting out of: Rio de Janeiro, Brazil
- Team: Nova União; Ruas Vale Tudo
- Trainer: André Pederneiras
- Rank: Black belt in Brazilian Jiu-Jitsu under André Pederneiras; Black belt in Luta Livre under Marco Ruas
- Years active: 2004–2025 (MMA); 2023–2025 (boxing)

Professional boxing record
- Total: 2
- Wins: 1
- Draws: 1

Mixed martial arts record
- Total: 42
- Wins: 32
- By knockout: 17
- By submission: 1
- By decision: 14
- Losses: 10
- By knockout: 4
- By submission: 1
- By decision: 5

Other information
- Boxing record from BoxRec
- Mixed martial arts record from Sherdog

José Aldo da Silva Oliveira Júnior (Portuguese pronunciation: [ʒoˈzɛ ˈawdu]; born 9 September 1986) is a Brazilian former professional mixed martial artist who competed in the Bantamweight and Featherweight divisions of the Ultimate Fighting Championship (UFC), where he was the inaugural and longest-reigning UFC Featherweight Champion, becoming champion after the UFC/WEC merger. Aldo is also the former interim UFC Featherweight Champion. He formerly competed in World Extreme Cagefighting, where he was the fourth and final WEC Featherweight Champion. Aldo is considered to be one of the greatest mixed martial artists of all time, and is often regarded as one of the greatest featherweights of all time after defending his UFC title seven times and his WEC title twice.

After his first MMA defeat in November 2005, Aldo remained undefeated for over a decade, winning 18 straight fights until UFC 194 in December 2015, when he lost to Conor McGregor. He was named Sherdog's 2009 Fighter of the Year. In Sherdog's April 2017 pound-for-pound ranking, Aldo was called "the greatest featherweight in mixed martial arts history." Fight Matrix currently ranks him as the greatest featherweight of all time and the third-greatest pound-for-pound fighter.

== Background ==
José Aldo was born on 9 September 1986, in Manaus, Brazil. As an infant, a crib he was in was thrown onto a barbecue, leaving a permanent scar on the left side of his face. Throughout his teen years, he was keen on football and wanted to become a professional. His aspirations were supported by his father. But Aldo grew tired of getting beaten up in fights on the street, thus starting to train capoeira to learn ways to defend himself better in brawls. Aldo used to train capoeira on the streets after the classes, once gaining attention of a Brazilian jiu-jitsu trainer. He invited Aldo to try one session of jiu-jitsu and after the session, Aldo decided to leave capoeira to start training jiu-jitsu. At the age of 17, Aldo moved from Manaus to Rio de Janeiro having only his clothes with him and determination to train mixed martial arts there until he achieved something in the sport. He is a teammate and training partner of former UFC Bantamweight champion Renan Barão at Nova União.

== Mixed martial arts career ==
=== Early career ===
Known by the nickname "Junior", José Aldo da Silva Oliveira Júnior fought his very first professional MMA fight at the age of 17 at EcoFight 1 on 10 August 2004. He fought fellow countryman and newcomer Mário Bigola, whom he defeated by knockout in just 16 seconds into the first round. It would be Bigola's first and only professional fight.

Aldo fought fellow Brazilian Hudson Rocha, in his second fight for Shooto Brazil. The fight was ended by a doctor stoppage at the end of the first round due to a cut over Rocha's left eye, which was caused by a flying knee thrown by Aldo followed by a barrage of punches. Rocha was able to get back to his feet only to be met with more strikes and a knee before Aldo kicked his legs out from under him.

Five months later he fought MMA newcomer Luiz de Paula at Shooto – Brazil 7. Aldo took de Paula down in the clinch early on in the fight. He quickly gained mount, where he rained down punches before transitioning to an arm-triangle choke, forcing de Paula to tap at 1:54 of the first round.

Aldo spent the next several years jumping from organization to organization. He next fought Vale Tudo and Shooto veteran Aritano Silva Barbosa, who had lost four of his last five fights, at Rio MMA Challenge 1 on 12 May 2005. Aldo landed two knees to the chin of Barbosa in the opening seconds of the fight, sending him to the canvas where Aldo swarmed with punches. Barbosa attempted a single-leg takedown, but Aldo pulled away and threw two soccer kicks to the prone Barbosa before the referee stopped the fight at twenty seconds of the first round, awarding Aldo the victory via knockout. Less than two months later Aldo fought newcomer Anderson Silvério at Meca World Vale Tudo 12. He also defeated Silvério with soccer kicks, 8:33 into the first round.

Aldo then traveled to England, where he fought Micky Young at FX3- Battle of Britain on 15 October 2005. He defeated Young just 1:05 into the first round by TKO (punches).

=== Loss to Azevedo ===
Only a month later, in November 2005, Aldo went up a weight class to lightweight and fought respected Luta Livre black belt Luciano Azevedo at Jungle Fight 5. Aldo won the first round, winning most of the exchanges with solid combinations and leg kicks and stuffing Azevedo's numerous takedown attempts (he was nearly taken down early in the round, but appeared to purposefully fall out of the ropes to force a restart from the referee), as well as landing a solid knee as Azevedo went for a takedown. Aldo shrugged off Azevedo's first few takedown attempts in the second but was eventually taken down against the ropes by a double leg. Aldo raised his hips up looking for triangles and other submissions, but Azevedo easily defended.

Azevedo soon passed to half-guard and side control. He then transitioned to full mount. Aldo quickly gave up his back and rolled into the ropes. The referee restarted the fight in the center of the ring, where Azevedo locked his legs around Aldo in a body triangle. Aldo controlled Azevedo's hands for several seconds before falling back into the corner of the ring, where Azevedo was able to secure the fight-ending rear-naked choke 3:37 into round two. The loss was Aldo's first as a professional.

=== Rebound ===
Aldo rebounded in his next fight, returning to featherweight against the then-undefeated Thiago "Minu" Meller at Gold Fighters Championship I on 20 May 2006, winning a unanimous decision in a very close fight. Round one could have gone either way, with Aldo getting two takedowns (both times getting into half-guard) and cutting Meller's right eyebrow with a left hand. Meller went for two armbars, nearly hyper-extending Aldo's right arm in the first attempt before Aldo was able to escape. Aldo won a lackluster round two, again taking Meller down and landing some hammer fists. A seemingly exhausted Aldo stalled against the ropes much of the third round, holding Meller in the clinch. Both landed some solid strikes in the few exchanges there were in the round.

=== Pancrase ===
In his last bout before joining the WEC, Aldo fought Pancrase veteran Shoji Maruyama in the Pancrase 2007 Neo-Blood Tournament Finals. Aldo won a unanimous decision, dominating Maruyama standing and on the ground. In the first exchange, Aldo landed a front kick to Maruyama's body, sending him to the canvas. He was able to land the cleaner shots in exchanges, where he connected with leg kicks and knees while in the clinch. He took Maruyama down almost at will with trips and body-locks; whereas Maruyama failed in all his attempts to get Aldo to the mat. On the ground, Aldo was able to get side control as well as top and back mount.

=== World Extreme Cagefighting ===
Aldo made his debut for mixed martial arts promoter World Extreme Cagefighting on 1 June 2008, at the Arco Arena in Sacramento, California. In his debut with the organization he defeated renowned fighter Alexandre Franca Nogueira at WEC 34. Aldo won his fight on 7 June 2009, at WEC 41 against Cub Swanson via double flying knee eight seconds into the first round.

Aldo won the WEC Featherweight Championship against Mike Brown on 18 November 2009 at WEC 44. He won by TKO in the second round. He was able to get Brown in the back mount, where he landed a barrage of punches, ending the fight at 1:20 of the round. José Aldo was the recipient of Fighter of the Year accolades for 2009 from both MMA Live and Sherdog.com.

Aldo faced former titleholder Urijah Faber on 24 April 2010, at WEC 48. Aldo defeated Faber via unanimous decision (49–45, 49–45, and 50–45). Aldo was able to use effective leg and body kicks (a total of thirty-two) to stifle Faber, sending him to the canvas several times with solid kicks. For the remaining 1:40 of the fourth round, Aldo trapped Faber in the crucifix, peppering him with punches and elbows. Aldo did not engage most of the fifth (although he did land a body shot that nearly crumpled Faber). This was Aldo's first decision win in his WEC career.

Aldo defended his title against Manny Gamburyan by KO at 1:32 of the second round on 30 September 2010 at WEC 51.

Aldo and his camp have often mentioned his desire to eventually make the move up in weight to the lightweight division (155-pound limit). Having rolled through all of his opposition in the WEC featherweight class, the UFC offered Aldo a fight against Kenny Florian, who has challenged for the UFC lightweight title. Aldo and his camp declined the fight, instead deciding to remain at featherweight for the time being to defend his WEC belt.

=== Ultimate Fighting Championship ===
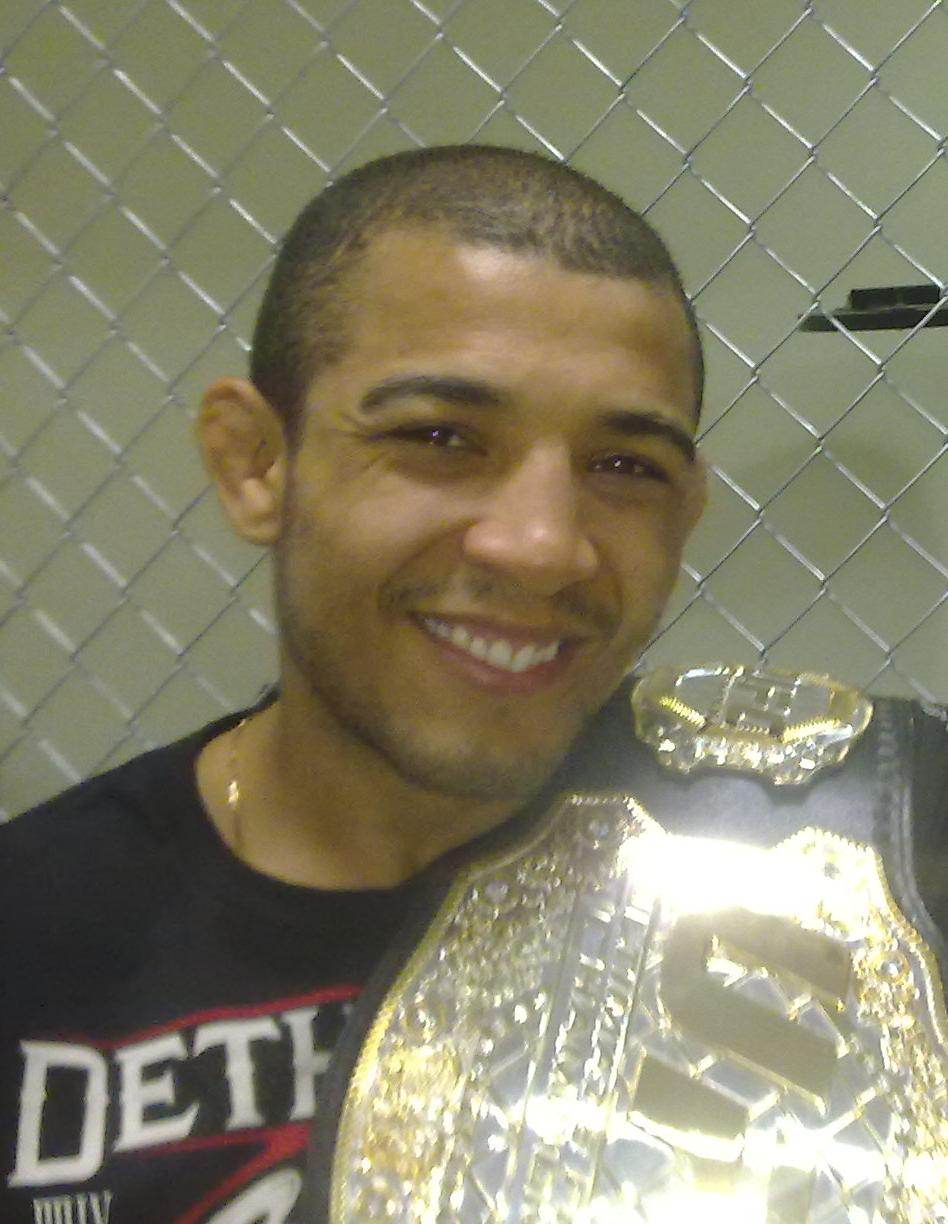
Aldo in 2011

On 28 October 2010, World Extreme Cagefighting merged with the Ultimate Fighting Championship. As part of the merger, all WEC fighters were transferred to the UFC. Aldo became the inaugural UFC Featherweight Champion, receiving the first ever UFC featherweight title belt on Saturday, 20 November 2010 at UFC 123. His first defense was set to take place at UFC 125 against Josh Grispi. Aldo was forced to withdraw from UFC 125 after suffering a neck injury.

==== UFC Featherweight Champion ====
Aldo made his first title defense against Mark Hominick on 30 April 2011, at UFC 129 by defeating the Canadian by a unanimous decision in a bout that earned Fight of the Night honors.

Aldo had his second title defense against Kenny Florian on 8 October 2011, at UFC 136, where he won by unanimous decision.

Aldo next faced Chad Mendes on 14 January 2012, at UFC 142, Aldo won via KO in the final second of the first round. His post-fight celebration, where he sprinted out of the cage and into the crowd at the HSBC Arena in Rio, is regarded as one of his most iconic moments as champion.

After a series of injuries and opponent change-ups, Aldo faced former UFC Lightweight Champion Frankie Edgar at UFC 156. Aldo retained his belt via unanimous decision (49–46, 49–46, and 48–47). The performance earned both participants Fight of the Night honors. This performance resulted in Aldo setting the record for most championship bouts, including his original title plus three defences.

Aldo was expected to face Anthony Pettis on 3 August 2013, at UFC 163. However, in mid-June Pettis pulled out of the bout citing a knee injury and was replaced by Chan Sung Jung. Aldo defeated Jung via fourth-round TKO, finishing Jung with a flurry of strikes after Jung suffered a dislocated shoulder while throwing an overhand right.

On 1 February 2014, at UFC 169 Aldo defended his title by defeating Ricardo Lamas by unanimous decision (49–46, 49–46, and 49–46).

Aldo again was in talks to fight Pettis after defending his title against Lamas. At the post-fight press conference, Aldo expressed interest to move up and fight Pettis at 155 lbs. However, those plans were quickly refuted as Pettis was selected to serve as a coach on The Ultimate Fighter 20.

A rematch with Chad Mendes was expected to take place on 2 August 2014, in the event headliner at UFC 176. However, in early July, Aldo pulled out of the bout with an injury. The rematch with Mendes was subsequently rescheduled and took place for 25 October 2014 at UFC 179. Despite getting dropped in the first round and being rocked in the third, Aldo scored two knockdowns of his own, one in the first and the other in the third and also rocked Mendes throughout the fight, winning four of the five rounds in the eyes of the judges thus taking the fight by unanimous decision (49–46, 49–46, and 49–46). The win also earned him his third Fight of the Night bonus award, and was selected Fight of the Year by multiple MMA outlets.

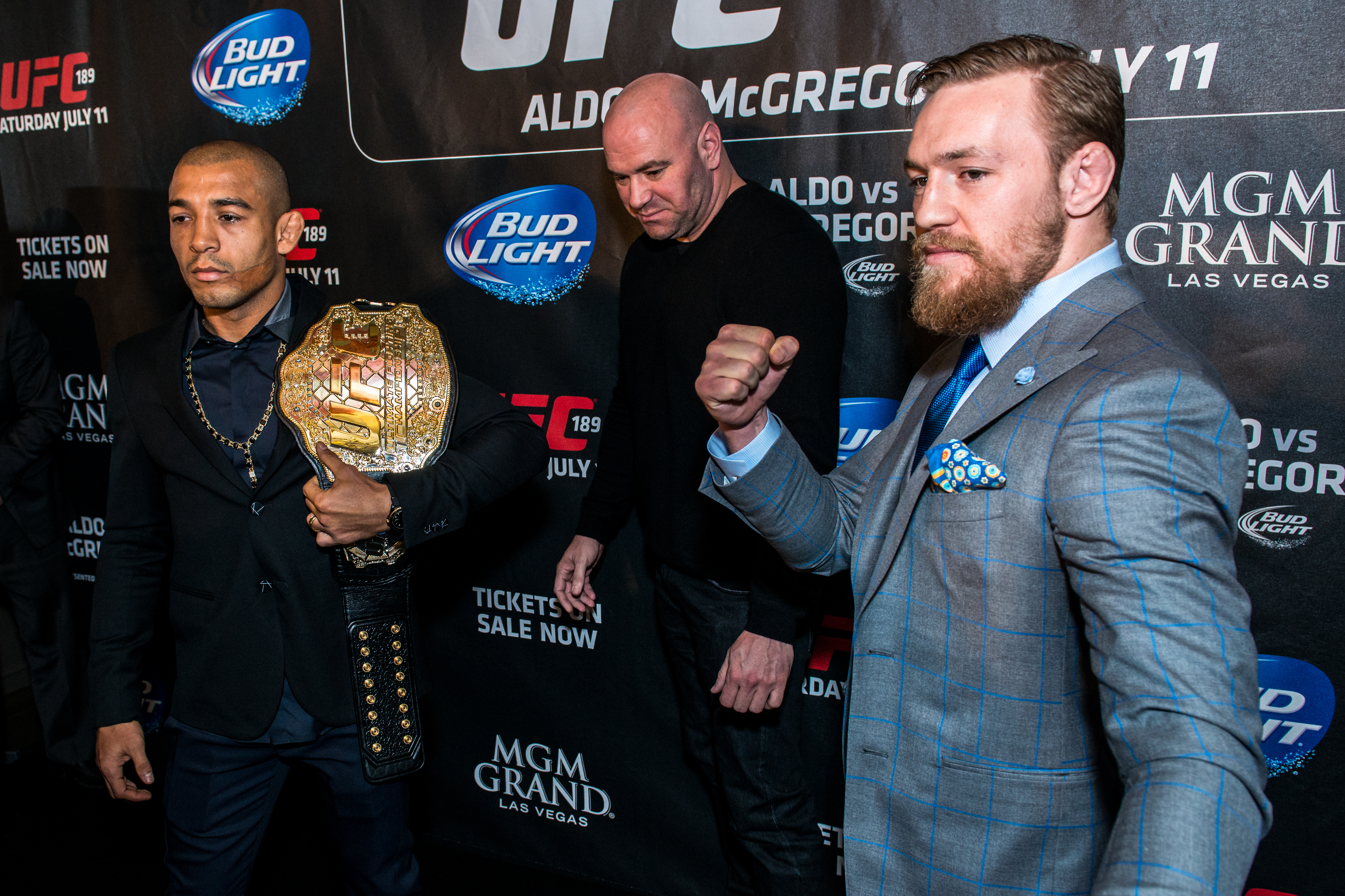
Aldo (left) and Conor McGregor (right) pose for photos during the UFC 189 press conference in London.

==== Losing the belt and further title fights ====
Aldo was scheduled to face Conor McGregor on 11 July 2015, at UFC 189. On 30 June, Aldo pulled out of the fight, citing a rib injury which makes him unable to fight. Chad Mendes took his place and was defeated by McGregor for an interim title. Aldo faced McGregor in a title unification match on 12 December 2015, at UFC 194. He lost the fight via knockout 13 seconds into the first round, resulting in his first defeat in over ten years and his first ever loss at featherweight, ending a 15 fight win streak in the division.

Aldo faced Frankie Edgar in a rematch on 9 July 2016, at UFC 200 for the interim UFC Featherweight Championship. Aldo won the fight by unanimous decision (49–46, 49–46, and 48–47). On 26 November 2016, reigning UFC Featherweight Champion Conor McGregor was stripped of the title after winning the UFC Lightweight Championship, having never defended the Featherweight belt since he won it in December 2015. As a result, Aldo was promoted to Featherweight Champion.

Aldo faced interim featherweight champion Max Holloway in a title unification bout on 3 June 2017, in the main event at UFC 212. After winning the first two rounds on all three judges scorecards, he lost the fight by TKO in the third round. Despite the loss, the fight earned Aldo his fourth Fight of the Night bonus award. This was Aldo's 3rd loss in his 29 fight career.

Aldo was scheduled to face Ricardo Lamas on 16 December 2017, at UFC on Fox: Lawler vs. dos Anjos. However, Aldo was pulled from the bout in favour of a rematch with Holloway two weeks earlier at UFC 218, replacing an injured Frankie Edgar. Similarly to the first fight, Aldo found success in the opening rounds before slowing down and losing the fight via TKO in the third round.

Aldo faced Jeremy Stephens at UFC on Fox 30 on 28 July 2018. The fight was Aldo's first non-title (three round) fight in over nine years. Aldo won the fight by TKO after a left hook to the body dropped Stephens, and the fight was stopped due to subsequent strikes from Aldo. This win earned him the Performance of the Night award.

Aldo faced Renato Moicano on 2 February 2019 in the co-main event at UFC Fight Night 144. He won the fight via TKO in the second round. This win earned him the Performance of the Night award.

Aldo faced Alexander Volkanovski at UFC 237 on 11 May 2019, in Rio de Janeiro, Brazil. Aldo lost the fight via unanimous decision.

On 24 June 2019, it was announced that Aldo had signed a new exclusive eight-fight contract with the UFC prior to his bout with Volkanovski. This marked a major deviation from Aldo's previous firm stance on retiring by the end of 2019, in which he stated "I had already planned to stop when I was 30 years old and begin something else. I'm at a point where I have to make a decision, and nothing is going to change my mind. Martial arts is always going to be a part of my life, but everything has a beginning, a middle, and an end. And I see this coming to an end."

==== Move to Bantamweight ====
On 23 October 2019, it was announced that Aldo would be moving down to the Bantamweight division. He faced Marlon Moraes at UFC 245 on 14 December 2019. He lost the largely contested bout via split decision. 9 out of 18 media outlets scored the bout for both Aldo and Moraes.

Aldo was expected to face UFC Bantamweight Champion Henry Cejudo on 9 May 2020 at then UFC 250. However, Aldo pulled out on 8 April due to visa issues as the event was expected to be moved to the United States due to the COVID-19 pandemic. Following Cejudo's title defense against Dominick Cruz at UFC 249, Cejudo announced he would be retiring from active mixed martial arts competition and he vacated the UFC bantamweight championship. The UFC then announced that Aldo would be facing Petr Yan at UFC 251 on 12 July 2020, for the vacant bantamweight title. Aldo lost the bout via technical knockout in round five.

Aldo faced Marlon Vera on 19 December 2020 at UFC Fight Night 183. He won the fight via unanimous decision.

Aldo faced Pedro Munhoz on 7 August 2021 at UFC 265. He won the fight via unanimous decision.

Aldo faced Rob Font in the main event of UFC on ESPN 31 on 4 December 2021. After nearly finishing Font with punches multiple times, Aldo won the fight via unanimous decision.

Aldo faced Merab Dvalishvili on 20 August 2022 at UFC 278. He lost the bout via unanimous decision.

==== Retirement ====
On 18 September 2022, the same day as the birth of his son, it was announced that Aldo had retired from MMA with one fight remaining on his UFC contract. Despite the initial reports, Aldo remained under contract with the UFC but was granted permission to pursue opportunities in other sports.

==== Return from retirement ====
Aldo, coming out of his retirement, faced Jonathan Martinez on 4 May 2024, at UFC 301. He won the fight by unanimous decision.

Aldo faced Mario Bautista on 5 October 2024 at UFC 307. Despite defending ten out of ten takedowns, he lost the fight by split decision. 9 out of 18 media outlets scored the bout for both Aldo and Bautista.

Aldo faced Aiemann Zahabi in a Featherweight bout on 10 May 2025 at UFC 315. The bout was originally scheduled for Bantamweight, but was changed on the day of the weigh-ins after Aldo couldn't make weight. He lost the bout by unanimous decision and announced his retirement from mixed martial arts competition in his post-fight interview. 16 out of 20 media outlets scored the bout for Aldo.

== Professional boxing career ==
After many years of publicly voicing his will to box, Aldo fought Emmanuel Zambrano in an exhibition bout on 10 February 2023 at the Nova Uniano Upper Arena in Rio de Janeiro, Brazil. Aldo defeated Zambrano via unanimous decision. After the bout, it was reported that Aldo was in talks to have an exhibition bout with American professional boxer Floyd Mayweather Jr.

=== Aldo vs. Stephens ===
On 1 April 2023, Aldo made his professional boxing debut against American mixed martial artist Jeremy Stephens on the undercard of Roy Jones Jr. vs. Anthony Pettis at the Fiserv Forum in Milwaukee, Wisconsin. The bout ended via majority draw.

On 2 July 2023, Aldo faced Brazilian professional boxer Esteban Gabriel Espindola at the Nova Uniano Upper Arena in Rio de Janeiro. Aldo won via unanimous decision.

== Fighting style ==
Aldo is known primarily for his Muay Thai style striking and leg kicks, coupled with defensive wrestling. Aldo also holds a black belt in Brazilian native Catch wrestling style Luta livre and Brazilian Jiu-jitsu. He has also trained Muay Thai with Dutch shootboxer Andy Souwer since his fight with Mark Hominick.

On 28 September 2014, at Nova União, under the tutelage of Mestre Roberto Leitão (10th Dan), Daniel F. A. Malvino "Pirata" (1st Dan), Marco Ruas (7th Dan) and Daniel D'dane (4th Dan), Aldo was awarded his black belt in Luta Livre. His Luta Livre instructor lineage is as follows: Roberto Leitão Sr. → João Ricardo N. de Almeida → Marco Ruas → José Aldo.

== Personal life ==
Aldo was poor growing up and often went on days with little to no food. WEC general manager Reed Harris states, "They were telling me that Wagnney Fabiano would be at the gym, and José would show up, and Wagnney would say, 'Have you eaten today or yesterday?' If not, they would go get him some food. That's how poor he was." When asked in an interview with WEC what his motivation is, Aldo replied, "My personal desires. My dream, my goal is to own my own house. This dream motivates me more and more as I get closer to fulfilling it." The Brazilian film Mais Forte que o Mundo was based on his early life.

Aldo is married to Vivianne Perreira, who has a purple belt in jiu-jitsu and has fought twice professionally in Muay Thai. Their daughter was born in 2012. On 18 September 2022, Vivianne gave birth to the couple's first son.

Aldo is an avid football fan and supports Clube de Regatas do Flamengo and English Premier League club Chelsea FC.

He has let former President of Brazil Jair Bolsonaro stay in his Florida house after Lula's inauguration.

== Instructor lineage ==
=== Brazilian Jiu-Jitsu ===
Mitsuyo Maeda → Carlos Gracie → Carlson Gracie → André Pederneiras → José Aldo

=== Luta Livre ===
Euclydes Hatem → Roberto Leitão → João Ricardo N. de Almeida → Marco Ruas → José Aldo

=== Muay Thai ===
Nélio "Naja" Borges → Luiz Alves → Marco Ruas → Pedro Rizzo → José Aldo

== Championships and accomplishments ==
=== Mixed martial arts ===
- Ultimate Fighting Championship
  - UFC Hall of Fame (Modern wing, Class of 2023)
  - UFC Featherweight Championship (Two times, inaugural)
    - Seven successful title defenses (first reign)
    - Interim UFC Featherweight Champion (One time)
    - Most successful title defenses in UFC featherweight history (7)
    - Most consecutive title defenses in UFC featherweight history (7)
    - Second most title fight wins in UFC Featherweight division history (8) (behind Alexander Volkanovski)
      - Most title fight wins in UFC/WEC combined featherweight division history (11)
    - Most title fights in UFC Featherweight history (11)
  - Fight of the Night (Four times) vs. Mark Hominick, Frankie Edgar, Chad Mendes, and Max Holloway
  - Performance of the Night (Two times) vs. Jeremy Stephens and Renato Moicano
  - Tied for sixth most unanimous decision wins in UFC history (10)
  - Tied (Max Holloway) for most finishes in UFC/WEC Featherweight division history (11)
  - UFC.com Awards
    - 2011: Ranked #2 Import of the Year
    - 2014: Ranked #2 Fight of the Year vs. Chad Mendes 2
- World Extreme Cagefighting
  - WEC Featherweight Champion (One time; final)
    - Two successful title defenses
  - Youngest champion in WEC history (23 years, 70 days)
  - Knockout of the Night (Three times) vs. Rolando Perez, Cub Swanson, and Mike Brown
  - Most consecutive wins in WEC history (Eight)
- BJPenn.com
  - 2010s #9 Ranked Fighter of the Decade
- Sherdog
  - 2009 Fighter of the Year
  - 2010 All-Violence Second Team
  - Mixed Martial Arts Hall of Fame
  - 2021 Comeback Fighter of the Year
- World MMA Awards
  - 2010 Charles "Mask" Lewis Fighter of the Year
  - 2014 Fight of the Year vs. Chad Mendes 2 at UFC 179
- MMA Fighting
  - 2009 Fighter of the Year
- ESPN
  - 2014 Fight of the Year vs. Chad Mendes 2 at UFC 179
- Inside MMA
  - 2009 Breakthrough Fighter of the Year Bazzie Award
- Bloody Elbow
  - 2009 Fighter of the Year
  - 2009 Breakout Fighter of the Year
  - 2014 Fight of the Year vs. Chad Mendes 2 at UFC 179
- MMA Junkie
  - 2014 Fight of the Year vs. Chad Mendes 2 at UFC 179
  - 2014 October Fight of the Month vs. Chad Mendes 2
  - 2010s #9 Ranked Fighter of the Decade
- Wrestling Observer Newsletter
  - Feud of the Year (2015) vs. Conor McGregor
- Fight Matrix
  - 2014 Male Fighter of the Year
  - 2017 Most Noteworthy Match of the Year vs. Max Holloway II at UFC 218
- MixedMartialArts.com
  - 2009 Fighter of the Year
- Inside Fights
  - 2009 Breakout Fighter of the Year
- Bleacher Report
  - 2013 #6 Ranked Fighter of the Year
  - 2014 #5 Ranked Fighter of the Year
  - 2014 #2 Ranked Fight of the Year vs. Chad Mendes 2 at UFC 179
- Yahoo Sports
  - 2014 #2 Ranked Fight of the Year vs. Chad Mendes 2 at UFC 179

=== Grappling credentials ===
- CBJJ World Championships
  - 2001 World Championship Bronze Medalist (blue belt)
- CBJJ Brazilian Championships
  - 2003 Brazilian National Champion (purple belt)
- CBJJO Copa Del Mundo
  - 2004 World Cup Champion (brown belt)

== Mixed martial arts record ==
Professional record breakdown
42 matches	32 wins	10 losses
By knockout	17	4
By submission	1	1
By decision	14	5

Res.	Record	Opponent	Method	Event	Date	Round	Time	Location	Notes
Loss	32–10	Aiemann Zahabi	Decision (unanimous)	UFC 315	10 May 2025	3	5:00	Montreal, Quebec, Canada	Featherweight bout.
Loss	32–9	Mario Bautista	Decision (split)	UFC 307	5 October 2024	3	5:00	Salt Lake City, Utah, United States	
Win	32–8	Jonathan Martinez	Decision (unanimous)	UFC 301	4 May 2024	3	5:00	Rio de Janeiro, Brazil	
Loss	31–8	Merab Dvalishvili	Decision (unanimous)	UFC 278	20 August 2022	3	5:00	Salt Lake City, Utah, United States	
Win	31–7	Rob Font	Decision (unanimous)	UFC on ESPN: Font vs. Aldo	4 December 2021	5	5:00	Las Vegas, Nevada, United States	
Win	30–7	Pedro Munhoz	Decision (unanimous)	UFC 265	7 August 2021	3	5:00	Houston, Texas, United States	
Win	29–7	Marlon Vera	Decision (unanimous)	UFC Fight Night: Thompson vs. Neal	19 December 2020	3	5:00	Las Vegas, Nevada, United States	
Loss	28–7	Petr Yan	TKO (punches)	UFC 251	12 July 2020	5	3:24	Abu Dhabi, United Arab Emirates	For the vacant UFC Bantamweight Championship.
Loss	28–6	Marlon Moraes	Decision (split)	UFC 245	14 December 2019	3	5:00	Las Vegas, Nevada, United States	Bantamweight debut.
Loss	28–5	Alexander Volkanovski	Decision (unanimous)	UFC 237	11 May 2019	3	5:00	Rio de Janeiro, Brazil	
Win	28–4	Renato Moicano	TKO (punches)	UFC Fight Night: Assunção vs. Moraes 2	2 February 2019	2	0:44	Fortaleza, Brazil	Performance of the Night.
Win	27–4	Jeremy Stephens	TKO (punches)	UFC on Fox: Alvarez vs. Poirier 2	28 July 2018	1	4:19	Calgary, Alberta, Canada	Performance of the Night.
Loss	26–4	Max Holloway	TKO (punches)	UFC 218	2 December 2017	3	4:51	Detroit, Michigan, United States	For the UFC Featherweight Championship.
Loss	26–3	Max Holloway	TKO (punches)	UFC 212	3 June 2017	3	4:13	Rio de Janeiro, Brazil	Lost the UFC Featherweight Championship. Fight of the Night.
Win	26–2	Frankie Edgar	Decision (unanimous)	UFC 200	9 July 2016	5	5:00	Las Vegas, Nevada, United States	Won the interim UFC Featherweight Championship. Later promoted to undisputed champion.
Loss	25–2	Conor McGregor	KO (punch)	UFC 194	12 December 2015	1	0:13	Las Vegas, Nevada, United States	Lost the UFC Featherweight Championship.
Win	25–1	Chad Mendes	Decision (unanimous)	UFC 179	25 October 2014	5	5:00	Rio de Janeiro, Brazil	Defended the UFC Featherweight Championship. Fight of the Night.
Win	24–1	Ricardo Lamas	Decision (unanimous)	UFC 169	1 February 2014	5	5:00	Newark, New Jersey, United States	Defended the UFC Featherweight Championship.
Win	23–1	Jung Chan-sung	TKO (punches)	UFC 163	3 August 2013	4	2:00	Rio de Janeiro, Brazil	Defended the UFC Featherweight Championship.
Win	22–1	Frankie Edgar	Decision (unanimous)	UFC 156	2 February 2013	5	5:00	Las Vegas, Nevada, United States	Defended the UFC Featherweight Championship. Fight of the Night.
Win	21–1	Chad Mendes	KO (knee)	UFC 142	14 January 2012	1	4:59	Rio de Janeiro, Brazil	Defended the UFC Featherweight Championship.
Win	20–1	Kenny Florian	Decision (unanimous)	UFC 136	8 October 2011	5	5:00	Houston, Texas, United States	Defended the UFC Featherweight Championship.
Win	19–1	Mark Hominick	Decision (unanimous)	UFC 129	30 April 2011	5	5:00	Toronto, Ontario, Canada	Defended the UFC Featherweight Championship. Fight of the Night.
Win	18–1	Manny Gamburyan	KO (punches)	WEC 51	30 September 2010	2	1:32	Broomfield, Colorado, United States	Defended the WEC Featherweight Championship. Later promoted to UFC Featherweight Champion.
Win	17–1	Urijah Faber	Decision (unanimous)	WEC 48	24 April 2010	5	5:00	Sacramento, California, United States	Defended the WEC Featherweight Championship.
Win	16–1	Mike Brown	TKO (punches)	WEC 44	18 November 2009	2	1:20	Las Vegas, Nevada, United States	Won the WEC Featherweight Championship. Knockout of the Night.
Win	15–1	Cub Swanson	TKO (flying knee and punches)	WEC 41	7 June 2009	1	0:08	Sacramento, California, United States	WEC Featherweight title eliminator. Knockout of the Night.
Win	14–1	Chris Mickle	TKO (punches)	WEC 39	1 March 2009	1	1:39	Corpus Christi, Texas, United States	
Win	13–1	Rolando Perez	KO (knee and punches)	WEC 38	25 January 2009	1	4:15	San Diego, California, United States	Knockout of the Night.
Win	12–1	Jonathan Brookins	TKO (punches)	WEC 36	5 November 2008	3	0:45	Hollywood, Florida, United States	
Win	11–1	Alexandre Franca Nogueira	TKO (punches)	WEC 34	1 June 2008	2	3:22	Sacramento, California, United States	
Win	10–1	Shoji Maruyama	Decision (unanimous)	Pancrase: 2007 Neo-Blood Tournament Finals	27 July 2007	3	5:00	Tokyo, Japan	
Win	9–1	Fábio Mello	Decision (unanimous)	Top Fighting Championships 3	2 May 2007	3	5:00	Rio de Janeiro, Brazil	
Win	8–1	Thiago Meller	Decision (majority)	Gold Fighters Championship 1	20 May 2006	3	5:00	Rio de Janeiro, Brazil	
Loss	7–1	Luciano Azevedo	Submission (rear-naked choke)	Jungle Fight 5	26 November 2005	2	3:37	Manaus, Brazil	Lightweight bout.
Win	7–0	Micky Young	TKO (punches)	FX3: Battle of Britain	15 October 2005	1	1:05	Reading, England	
Win	6–0	Phil Harris	TKO (doctor stoppage)	UK-1: Fight Night	17 September 2005	1	N/A	Portsmouth, England	
Win	5–0	Anderson Silverio	TKO (submission to soccer kicks)	Meca World Vale Tudo 12	9 July 2005	1	8:33	Rio de Janeiro, Brazil	
Win	4–0	Aritano Silva Barbosa	KO (soccer kicks)	Rio MMA Challenge 1	12 May 2005	1	0:20	Rio de Janeiro, Brazil	
Win	3–0	Luiz de Paula	Submission (arm-triangle choke)	Shooto Brazil 7	19 March 2005	1	1:54	Rio de Janeiro, Brazil	
Win	2–0	Hudson Rocha	TKO (doctor stoppage)	Shooto Brazil 4	23 October 2004	1	5:00	São Paulo, Brazil	
Win	1–0	Mario Bigola	KO (head kick)	Eco Fight Championship 1	10 August 2004	1	0:18	Macapá, Brazil	

== Boxing record ==
=== Professional ===
2 fights	1 win	0 losses
By decision	1	0
Draws	1	

No.	Result	Record	Opponent	Type	Round, time	Date	Location	Notes
2	Win	1–0–1	Esteban Gabriel Espindola	UD	6	2 Jul 2023	Nova Uniao Upper Arena, Rio de Janeiro, Brazil	
1	Draw	0–0–1	Jeremy Stephens	MD	6	Apr 1, 2023	Fiserv Forum, Milwaukee, Wisconsin, U.S.	

=== Exhibition ===
1 fight	1 win	0 losses
By decision	1	0

No.	Result	Record	Opponent	Type	Round, time	Date	Location	Notes
1	Win	1–0	Emmanuel Zambrano	UD	6	10 Feb 2023	Nova Uniao Upper Arena, Rio de Janeiro, Brazil	

== Pay-per-view bouts ==
No	Event	Fight	Date	Venue	City	PPV buys
1.	WEC 48	Aldo vs. Faber	24 April 2010	ARCO Arena	Sacramento, California, U.S.	175,000
2.	UFC 142	Aldo vs. Mendes	14 January 2012	HSBC Arena	Rio de Janeiro, Brazil	235,000
3.	UFC 156	Aldo vs. Edgar	2 February 2013	Mandalay Bay Events Center	Las Vegas, Nevada, U.S.	330,000
4.	UFC 163	Aldo vs. Korean Zombie	3 August 2013	HSBC Arena	Rio de Janeiro, Brazil	180,000
5.	UFC 179	Aldo vs. Mendes 2	25 October 2014	Ginásio do Maracanãzinho	Rio de Janeiro, Brazil	180,000
6.	UFC 194	Aldo vs. McGregor	12 December 2015	MGM Grand Garden Arena	Las Vegas, Nevada, U.S.	1,200,000
7.	UFC 212	Aldo vs. Holloway	3 June 2017	Jeunesse Arena	Rio de Janeiro, Brazil	200,000
8.	UFC 218	Holloway vs. Aldo 2	2 December 2017	Little Caesars Arena	Detroit, Michigan, U.S.	230,000
Total sales						2,730,000

== See also ==
- List of current mixed martial arts champions
- List of male mixed martial artists
- List of mixed martial artists with professional boxing records

Achievements
Preceded by Mike Brown	4th WEC Featherweight Champion; 18 November 2009 – 28 October 2010	Succeeded by Became UFC Champion
New title	1st UFC Featherweight Champion; 20 November 2010 – 12 December 2015	Succeeded by Conor McGregor
Vacant Title last held by Conor McGregor	2nd UFC Interim Featherweight Champion; 9 July 2016 – 26 November 2016	Vacant Title next held by Max Holloway
Preceded by Conor McGregor	3rd UFC Featherweight Champion; 26 November 2016 – 3 June 2017	Succeeded by Max Holloway
Awards
Preceded by Georges St-Pierre	World MMA Fighter of the Year; 2010	Succeeded by Jon Jones
Preceded by Jon Jones vs. Alexander Gustafsson	World MMA Fight of the Year; 2014 vs. Chad Mendes at UFC 179	Succeeded by Robbie Lawler vs. Rory MacDonald
