= World MMA Awards =

Annual awards in mixed martial arts

- Awarded for: Excellence in the field of Mixed martial arts
- Country: United States
- Presented by: Fighters Only Magazine
- First award: 2008
- Website: WorldMMAAwards.com

Television/radio coverage
- Network: Versus; Fuel TV; Fox Sports Networks

The World MMA Awards are awards presented by Fighters Only magazine to honor exceptional performance in various aspects of mixed martial arts. Winners are presented with the Fighters Only silver statuette. The World MMA Awards are divided into over twenty categories. The first World MMA Awards ceremony was held in 2008. From their inception to the present, award winners have been chosen through online fan voting. It is the most prestigious award event in the world of MMA.On July 8th 2026, the 17th annual World MMA Awards will be streamed exclusively on Rumble.

== Active award categories ==
=== Fighters ===
Year	The Charles 'Mask' Lewis Fighter of the Year	Female Fighter of the Year	Breakthrough Fighter of the Year	International Fighter of the Year
2024-25	(Georgia (country)) Merab Dvalishvili	(United States) Kayla Harrison	(Myanmar) Joshua Van	(United Kingdom) Paddy Pimblett
2023-24	(Brazil) Alex Pereira	(China) Zhang Weili	(United Kingdom) Tom Aspinall	(South Africa) Dricus du Plessis
2022-23	(United Kingdom) Leon Edwards	(Mexico) Alexa Grasso	(Brazil) Alex Pereira	(United Kingdom) Leon Edwards
2021-22	(Australia) Alexander Volkanovski	(Kyrgyzstan) Valentina Shevchenko	(United Kingdom) Paddy Pimblett	(Australia) Alexander Volkanovski
2020-21	(Nigeria) Kamaru Usman	(United States) Rose Namajunas	(Mexico) Brandon Moreno	(Nigeria) Israel Adesanya
2019-20	(Nigeria) Israel Adesanya	(Brazil) Amanda Nunes	(United States) Jorge Masvidal	(Nigeria) Israel Adesanya
2018	(United States) Daniel Cormier	(Brazil) Amanda Nunes	(Nigeria) Israel Adesanya	(Myanmar) Aung La Nsang
2017	(United States) Max Holloway	(United States) Rose Namajunas	(United States) Brian Ortega	(Australia) Robert Whittaker
2016	(Republic of Ireland) Conor McGregor	(Brazil) Amanda Nunes	(United States) Cody Garbrandt	(Russia) Khabib Nurmagomedov
2015	(Republic of Ireland) Conor McGregor	(United States) Holly Holm	(United States) Holly Holm	(Republic of Ireland) Conor McGregor
2014	(United States) Robbie Lawler	(United States) Ronda Rousey	(United States) Kelvin Gastelum	(Republic of Ireland) Conor McGregor
2013	(United States) Chris Weidman	(United States) Ronda Rousey	(United States) Travis Browne	(Sweden) Alexander Gustafsson
2012	(United States) Jon Jones	(United States) Ronda Rousey	(United States) Chris Weidman	(United Kingdom) Michael Bisping
2011	(United States) Jon Jones	(United States) Miesha Tate	(United States) Donald Cerrone	(Netherlands) Alistair Overeem
2010	(Brazil) José Aldo	(Brazil) Cris Cyborg	(United States) Jon Jones	(Netherlands) Alistair Overeem
2009	(Canada) Georges St-Pierre	(Brazil) Cris Cyborg	(United States) Brock Lesnar	(Netherlands) Gegard Mousasi
2008	(Brazil) Anderson Silva	(United States) Gina Carano	(Brazil) Demian Maia	(United Kingdom) Michael Bisping

- From 2010, Fighter of the Year was awarded as The Charles 'Mask' Lewis Fighter of the Year in commemoration of Tapout co-founder Charles Lewis Jr.
- From 2010, European Fighter of the Year was awarded as International Fighter of the Year, to the leading MMA fighter from outside of the Americas.

=== Fight of the Year ===
Year	Winner	Defeated	Method, Round	Event
2024-25	(Myanmar) Joshua Van	(United States) Brandon Royval	UD, 3	UFC 317
2023-24	(United States) Max Holloway	(United States) Justin Gaethje	KO, 5	UFC 300
2022-23	(Russia) Islam Makhachev	(Australia) Alexander Volkanovski	UD, 5	UFC 284
2021-22	(Czech Republic) Jiří Procházka	(Brazil) Glover Teixeira	Sub, 5	UFC 275
2020-21	(Brazil) Deiveson Figueiredo	(Mexico) Brandon Moreno	M Draw, 5	UFC 256
2019-20	(China) Weili Zhang	(Poland) Joanna Jędrzejczyk	SD, 5	UFC 248
2018	(United States) Tony Ferguson	(United States) Anthony Pettis	TKO, 2	UFC 229
2017	(United States) Eddie Alvarez	(United States) Justin Gaethje	KO, 3	UFC 218
2016	(United States) Cub Swanson	(South Korea) Doo Ho Choi	UD, 3	UFC 206
2015	(United States) Robbie Lawler	(Canada) Rory MacDonald	TKO, 5	UFC 189
2014	(Brazil) José Aldo	(United States) Chad Mendes	UD, 5	UFC 179
2013	(United States) Jon Jones	(Sweden) Alexander Gustafsson	UD, 5	UFC 165
2012	(United States) Joe Lauzon	(United States) Jamie Varner	Sub, 3	UFC on Fox: Shogun vs. Vera
2011	(United States) Frankie Edgar	(United States) Gray Maynard	S Draw, 5	UFC 125
2010	(Brazil) Anderson Silva	(United States) Chael Sonnen	Sub, 5	UFC 117
2009	(United States) Diego Sanchez	(United States) Clay Guida	SD, 3	The Ultimate Fighter: United States vs. United Kingdom Finale
2008	(United States) Chuck Liddell	(Brazil) Wanderlei Silva	UD, 3	UFC 79

=== Knockout of the Year ===
Year	Winner	Knocked out	Method, Round	Event
2024-25	(Brazil) Maurício Ruffy	(United States) King Green	KO, 1	UFC 313
2023-24	(United States) Max Holloway	(United States) Justin Gaethje	KO, 5	UFC 300
2022-23	(United Kingdom) Leon Edwards	(Nigeria) Kamaru Usman	KO, 5	UFC 278
2021-22	(United States) Michael Chandler	(United States) Tony Ferguson	KO, 2	UFC 274
2020-21	(United States) Joaquin Buckley	(United States) Impa Kasanganay	KO, 2	UFC Fight Night: Moraes vs. Sandhagen
2019-20	(United States) Jorge Masvidal	(United States) Ben Askren	KO, 1	UFC 239
2018	(Brazil) Amanda Nunes	(Brazil) Cris Cyborg	KO, 1	UFC 232
2017	(Cameroon) Francis Ngannou	(Netherlands) Alistair Overeem	KO, 1	UFC 218
2016	(United Kingdom) Michael Page	(Brazil) Evangelista Santos	KO, 2	Bellator 158
2015	(United States) Holly Holm	(United States) Ronda Rousey	KO, 2	UFC 193
2014	(New Zealand) Mark Hunt	(United States) Roy Nelson	KO, 2	UFC Fight Night: Hunt vs. Nelson
2013	(Brazil) Vitor Belfort	(United States) Luke Rockhold	KO, 1	UFC on FX: Belfort vs. Rockhold
2012	(Brazil) Edson Barboza	(United Kingdom) Terry Etim	KO, 3	UFC 142
2011	(Brazil) Anderson Silva	(Brazil) Vitor Belfort	KO, 1	UFC 126
2010	(Brazil) Maurício Rua	(Brazil) Lyoto Machida	KO, 1	UFC 113
2009	(United States) Dan Henderson	(United Kingdom) Michael Bisping	KO, 2	UFC 100
2008	(Brazil) Wanderlei Silva	(United States) Keith Jardine	KO, 1	UFC 84

=== Submission of the Year ===
Year	Winner	Submitted	Method, Round	Event
2024-25	(Brazil) Jean Silva	(United States) Bryce Mitchell	Ninja choke, 2	UFC 314
2023-24	(Brazil) Diego Lopes	(Canada) Gavin Tucker	Armbar, 1	UFC on ESPN: Sandhagen vs. Font
2022-23	(Mexico) Alexa Grasso	(Kyrgyzstan) Valentina Shevchenko	Face crank, 4	UFC 285
2021-22	(Brazil) Charles Oliveira	(United States) Dustin Poirier	Rear-naked choke, 3	UFC 269
2020-21	(Russia) Khabib Nurmagomedov	(United States) Justin Gaethje	Triangle choke, 2	UFC 254
2019-20	(Brazil) Demian Maia	(United States) Ben Askren	Rear-naked choke, 3	UFC Fight Night: Maia vs. Askren
2018	(Russia) Zabit Magomedsharipov	(United States) Brandon Davis	Suloev stretch, 2	UFC 228
2017	(United States) Demetrious Johnson	(United States) Ray Borg	Armbar, 5	UFC 216
2016	(United States) Nate Diaz	(Republic of Ireland) Conor McGregor	Rear-naked choke, 2	UFC 196
2015	(United States) Ronda Rousey	(United States) Cat Zingano	Straight armbar, 1	UFC 184
2014	(United States) Ben Saunders	(United States) Chris Heatherly	Omoplata, 1	UFC Fight Night: Henderson vs. dos Anjos
2013	(United States) Urijah Faber	(El Salvador) Ivan Menjivar	Rear-naked choke, 1	UFC 157
2012	(United States) Frank Mir	(Brazil) Antônio Rodrigo Nogueira	Kimura, 1	UFC 140
2011	(South Korea) Chan Sung Jung	(United States) Leonard Garcia	Twister, 2	UFC Fight Night: Nogueira vs. Davis
2010	(Brazil) Fabrício Werdum	(Russia) Fedor Emelianenko	Triangle armbar, 1	Strikeforce: Fedor vs. Werdum
2009	(United States) Toby Imada	(United States) Jorge Masvidal	Inverted triangle choke, 3	Bellator 5
2008	(Canada) Georges St-Pierre	(United States) Matt Hughes	Armbar, 2	UFC 79

=== Comeback of the Year ===
Year	Winner	vs.	Method, Round	Event
2024-25	(United States) Jared Cannonier	(Brazil) Gregory Rodrigues	TKO, 4	UFC Fight Night: Cannonier vs. Rodrigues
2023-24	(United Kingdom) Tom Aspinall	"Career"	—N/a	—N/a
2022-23	(United Kingdom) Leon Edwards	(Nigeria) Kamaru Usman	KO, 5	UFC 278
2021-22	(United States) Aljamain Sterling	"Ridicule and Injury"	—N/a	—N/a
2020-21	(Brazil) Charles Oliveira	(United States) Michael Chandler	TKO, 2	UFC 262
2019-20	(United States) Stipe Miocic	(United States) Daniel Cormier	TKO, 4	UFC 241
2018	(United States) Angela Lee	(Japan) Mei Yamaguchi	UD, 5	Car accident, ONE FC 71
2017	(United States) Justin Gaethje	(United States) Michael Johnson	TKO, 2	The Ultimate Fighter: Redemption Finale
2016	(United States) Miesha Tate	(United States) Holly Holm	Sub, 5	UFC 196
2015	(United States) Eddie Alvarez	(United States) Gilbert Melendez	SD, 3	UFC 188
2014	(United States) Dominick Cruz	"Career"	—N/a	—N/a
2013	(United States) Travis Browne	(Netherlands) Alistair Overeem	KO, 1	UFC Fight Night: Shogun vs. Sonnen
2012	(United States) Frank Mir	(Brazil) Antônio Rodrigo Nogueira	Sub, 1	UFC 140
2011	(France) Cheick Kongo	(United States) Pat Barry	KO, 1	UFC Live: Kongo vs. Barry

=== Upset of the Year ===
Year	Winner	Defeated	Method, Round	Event
2024-25	(Netherlands) Reinier de Ridder	(United States) Bo Nickal	TKO, 2	UFC on ESPN: Sandhagen vs. Figueiredo
2023-24	(United States) Sean Strickland	(Nigeria) Israel Adesanya	UD, 5	UFC 293
2022-23	(Mexico) Alexa Grasso	(Kyrgyzstan) Valentina Shevchenko	Sub, 4	UFC 285
2021-22	(United States) Julianna Peña	(Brazil) Amanda Nunes	Sub, 2	UFC 269
2020-21	(Brazil) Adriano Moraes	(United States) Demetrious Johnson	KO, 2	ONE on TNT 1
2019-20	(Australia) Alexander Volkanovski	(United States) Max Holloway	UD, 5	UFC 245
2018	(Brazil) Amanda Nunes	(Brazil) Cris Cyborg	KO, 1	UFC 232
2017	(United States) Rose Namajunas	(Poland) Joanna Jędrzejczyk	TKO, 1	UFC 217
2016	(United Kingdom) Michael Bisping	(United States) Luke Rockhold	KO, 1	UFC 199
2015	(United States) Holly Holm	(United States) Ronda Rousey	KO, 2	UFC 193
2014	(United States) TJ Dillashaw	(Brazil) Renan Barao	TKO, 5	UFC 173

=== Training, In-ring ===
Year	The Shawn Tompkins Coach of the Year	Gym of the Year	Trainer of the Year	Referee of the Year	Ring-card Girl of the Year
2024-25	(United States) John Wood	(United States) Syndicate MMA	(Brazil) Everton Oliveira	(England) Marc Goddard	(United States) Brookliyn Wren
2023-24	(Brazil) Plinio Cruz	(Brazil) The Fighting Nerds	(United States) Ian Larios	(United States) Herb Dean	(Brazil) Luciana Andrade
2022-23	(United States) Mike Brown	(United States) American Top Team	(United States) Dr. Heather Linden	(United States) Herb Dean	(United States) Brittney Palmer
2021-22	(New Zealand) Eugene Bareman	(New Zealand) City Kickboxing	(United States) Dr. Heather Linden	(United Kingdom) Marc Goddard	(United States) Brittney Palmer
2020-21	(United States) Trevor Wittman	(United States) American Top Team	(United States) Phil Daru	(United States) Herb Dean	(United States) Brittney Palmer
2019-20	(United States) Trevor Wittman	(United States) American Top Team	(United States) Phil Daru	(United States) Herb Dean	(United States) Brittney Palmer
2018	(United States) Mike Brown	(United States) American Top Team	(United States) Nick Curson	(United States) Herb Dean	(Brazil) Jhenny Andrade
2017	(United States) Trevor Wittman	(United States) American Top Team	(United States) Nick Curson	(United States) John McCarthy	(Brazil) Jhenny Andrade
2016	(Republic of Ireland) John Kavanagh	(United States) American Top Team	(United States) Mike Dolce	(United States) John McCarthy	(Brazil) Jhenny Andrade
2015	(Brazil) Rafael Cordeiro	(United States) Jackson-Wink MMA Academy	(United States) Mike Dolce	(United States) John McCarthy	(United States) Arianny Celeste
2014	(United States) Duane Ludwig	(United States) Team Alpha Male	(United States) Mike Dolce	(United States) Herb Dean	(United States) Arianny Celeste
2013	(United States) Duane Ludwig	(United States) Team Alpha Male	(United States) Mike Dolce	(United States) Herb Dean	(United States) Brittney Palmer
2012	(Brazil) Rafael Cordeiro	(United States) Cesar Gracie Jiu-Jitsu	—N/a	(United States) Herb Dean	(United States) Brittney Palmer
2011	(United States) Greg Jackson	(United States) Black House	—N/a	(United States) Herb Dean	(United States) Arianny Celeste
2010	(United States) Greg Jackson	(United States) Wand Fight Team	—N/a	(United States) Herb Dean	(United States) Arianny Celeste
2009	(United States) Greg Jackson	(United States) Greg Jackson's Submission Fighting	—N/a	—N/a	(United States) Arianny Celeste
2008	—N/a	—N/a	—N/a	—N/a	(United States) Arianny Celeste

- From 2012, Coach of the Year was awarded as The Shawn Tompkins Coach of the Year in commemoration of trainer Shawn Tompkins.

=== Promotion ===
Year	Leading Man	Personality of the Year	Analyst of the Year	Best Promotion
2024-25	(United States) Dana White	(United States) Nina-Marie Danielle	(United States) Jon Anik	UFC
2023-24	(United States) Dana White	(United States) Nina-Marie Danielle	(United Kingdom) Michael Bisping	UFC
2022-23	(United States) Dana White	(United States) Joe Rogan	(United Kingdom) Michael Bisping	UFC
2021-22	(United States) Dana White	(United States) Joe Rogan	(United Kingdom) Michael Bisping	UFC
2020-21	(United States) Dana White	(United States) Daniel Cormier	(United Kingdom) Michael Bisping	UFC
2019-20	(United States) Dana White	(United States) Joe Rogan	(United States) Daniel Cormier	UFC
2018	(United States) Dana White	(United States) Joe Rogan	(United States) Daniel Cormier	UFC
2017	(United States) Dana White	(United States) Joe Rogan	(United States) Dominick Cruz	UFC
2016	(United States) Dana White	(United States) Joe Rogan	(United States) Dominick Cruz	UFC
2015	(United States) Dana White	(United States) Joe Rogan	(United States) Dominick Cruz	UFC
2014	(United States) Dana White	(United States) Joe Rogan	—N/a	UFC
2013	(United States) Dana White	(United States) Chael Sonnen	—N/a	UFC
2012	(United States) Dana White	(United States) Joe Rogan	—N/a	UFC
2011	(United States) Dana White	(United States) Joe Rogan	—N/a	UFC
2010	(United States) Dana White	(United States) Joe Rogan	—N/a	UFC
2009	(United States) Dana White	—N/a	—N/a	UFC
2008	(United States) Dana White	—N/a	—N/a	UFC

=== Media ===
Year	Media Source of the Year	Journalist of the Year	Best MMA Programming
2024-25	MMAjunkie.com	(Canada) Ariel Helwani	Dana White's Contender Series
2023-24	ESPN MMA	(Canada) Ariel Helwani	Dana White's Contender Series
2022-23	ESPN MMA	(Canada) Ariel Helwani	Dana White's Contender Series
2021-22	ESPN MMA	(Canada) Ariel Helwani	Morning Kombat
2020-21	ESPN MMA	(Canada) Ariel Helwani	Morning Kombat
2019-20	ESPN MMA	(Canada) Ariel Helwani	JRE MMA Podcast
2018	MMA Fighting	(Canada) Ariel Helwani	The Ultimate Fighter
2017	MMA Fighting	(Canada) Ariel Helwani	The Ultimate Fighter
2016	MMA Fighting	(Canada) Ariel Helwani	The Ultimate Fighter
2015	MMA Fighting	(Canada) Ariel Helwani	UFC Embedded
2014	MMAjunkie.com	(Canada) Ariel Helwani	—N/a
2013	MMA Fighting	(Canada) Ariel Helwani	—N/a
2012	Sherdog	(Canada) Ariel Helwani	—N/a
2011	MMAjunkie.com	(Canada) Ariel Helwani	—N/a
2010	MMAjunkie.com	(Canada) Ariel Helwani	—N/a
2009	MMAjunkie.com	(United States) John Morgan	—N/a
2008	MMAjunkie.com	—N/a	—N/a

- From 2010, Best Media Coverage was awarded as Media Source of the Year.

=== Special Achievement ===
Year	Lifetime Achievement Award	Fighting Spirit of the Year
2024-25	(United States) Duke Roufus	(United States) Ben Askren (Inspiration - documenting his fight against life-threatening illness and survived severe lung failure)
2023-24	(United States) Mark Coleman	(United States) Mark Coleman (Bravery - fearlessly rescuing family and loved ones from a burning building)
2022-23	(United States) Ken Shamrock	Themba Gorimbo (Charity – building a water pump in Zimbabwe and putting others ahead of himself)
2021-22	(United States) Kirik Jenness	(United States) Kevin Holland (Bravery - in and out of the cage, helping his community in the face of danger on several occasions)
2020-21	(United States) Matt Hughes	(Mexico) Brandon Moreno (Perseverance - from being cut, to fighting back and becoming the first Mexican UFC champion)
2019-20	(Russia) Abdulmanap Nurmagomedov	(United States) Dustin Poirier (Charity - Good Fight Foundation)
2018	(Brazil) Wanderlei Silva	—N/a
2017	(United States) John McCarthy	—N/a
2016	(United States) Tito Ortiz	—N/a
2015	(United States) Bruce Buffer	—N/a
2014	(United States) Burt Watson	—N/a
2013	(Brazil) Royce Gracie	—N/a
2012	(United States) Leon Tabbs	—N/a
2011	(Canada) Shawn Tompkins	—N/a
2010	(United States) Randy Couture	—N/a
2009	(United States) Charles Lewis, Jr.	—N/a
2008	(United States) John McCarthy	—N/a

== Defunct award categories ==
=== MMA Clothing & Equipment Brand of the Year ===
- 2015 Bad Boy
- 2016 Venum
- 2017 Reebok
- 2018 Reebok

=== Best MMA Brand ===
- 2008 Ultimate Fighting Championship
- 2009 TapouT

=== Most Memorable Ring Entrance ===
- 2010 (United States) Jason Miller
- 2011 (United States) Jason Miller

=== Best Lifestyle Clothing Brand ===
Best Overall Clothing.

- 2008 TapouT

Best MMA Clothing.

- 2009 TapouT

Best Lifestyle Clothing Brand.

- 2010 TapouT
- 2011 TapouT
- 2012 Bad Boy
- 2013 Bad Boy
- 2014 Bad Boy

=== Best Technical Clothing Brand ===
==== Best MMA Shorts. ====
- 2008 Sprawl
- 2009 TapouT

==== Best Technical Clothing Brand. ====
- 2010 Bad Boy
- 2011 Bad Boy
- 2012 Clinch Gear
- 2013 Venum
- 2014 Venum

=== Best Technical Equipment ===
Best MMA Gloves.

- 2008 Fairtex
- 2009 UFC / Century

Best Technical Equipment.

- 2010 Everlast
- 2011 Everlast
- 2012 Pretorian
- 2013 Bad Boy
- 2014 Everlast
