= John Morgan (mixed martial arts journalist) =

Mixed martial arts journalist, radio host and television commentator from United States

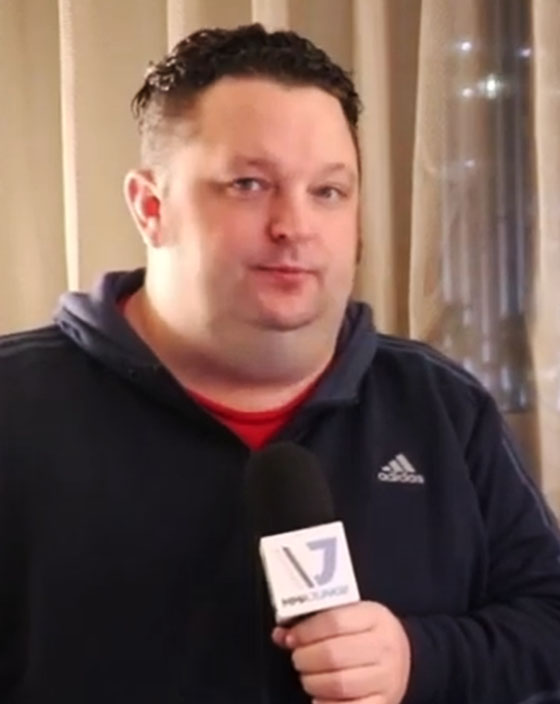
- Morgan at UFC 232
- Occupation: MMA journalist
- Years active: 2007–present

John Morgan is an American mixed martial arts writer, radio host and television commentator.

== Biography ==
Morgan was the lead staff reporter and co-owner of MMAjunkie.com (a content partner site of Yahoo! Sports) and has been covering MMA professionally since 2007.

He is co-host of "MMAjunkie.com Radio," which is simulcast on television as "MMAjunkie.com Radio Live" on the upstart Fight Now! TV cable channel. The channel is available on Cablevision in the Northeast U.S.

He is also a featured columnist for Fighters Only magazine and a frequent contributor to UFC Magazine, and he previously covered MMA for the Dallas Morning News.

In addition to his writing work, he has commentated MMA events online and for television for the Tachi Palace Fights, MMA Xplosion, Tuff-N-Uff and Superior Cage Combat organizations. He also occasionally co-hosts "MMA:30 Radio" on Las Vegas' KXNT Radio 100.5 FM/840 AM.

Morgan is routinely the first journalist to ask questions at UFC press conferences.

== Awards ==
Morgan was awarded MMA Journalist of the Year at the World MMA Awards 2009. He was nominated for the award again in 2010, 2011, 2012, 2013, 2014, 2015, 2016, 2017, 2018 and 2019, but ultimately lost to Ariel Helwani every time.

As the outlet's lead staff reporter, he also helped lead MMAjunkie.com to MMA Media Outlet of the Year victories at the World MMA Awards in 2008, 2009, 2010 and 2011.
