= Roy Jones Jr. vs. Anthony Pettis =

2023 cruiserweight professional boxing match

- Date: April 1, 2023
- Venue: Fiserv Forum, Milwaukee, Wisconsin, U.S.

Tale of the tape
Boxer	Roy Jones Jr.	Anthony Pettis
Nickname	"Junior"	"Showtime"
Hometown	Pensacola, Florida, U.S.	Milwaukee, Wisconsin, U.S.
Pre-fight record	66–9 (47 KOs)	0–0 (Professional boxing); 25–14 (11 KOs) (MMA)
Height	5 ft 11 in (180 cm)	5 ft 10 in (178 cm)
Style	Orthodox	Orthodox
Recognition	4-division world champion	Former WEC and UFC Lightweight Champion

Result
- Pettis defeated Jones Jr. via Majority Decision.

Roy Jones Jr. vs. Anthony Pettis was a cruiserweight professional boxing match between 4-division world champion Roy Jones Jr. and former WEC and UFC Lightweight Champion Anthony Pettis. The bout took place on April 1, 2023, at Fiserv Forum, Milwaukee, Wisconsin, U.S.A. Pettis defeated Jones Jr. via majority decision after 8 rounds.

== Background ==
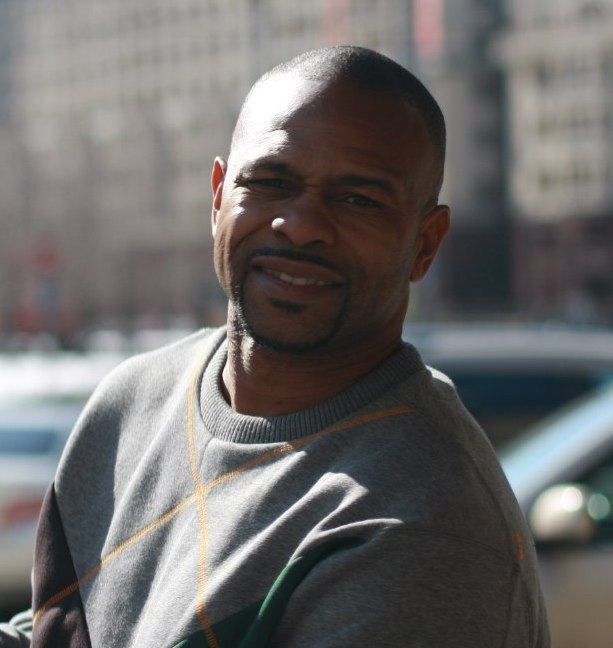
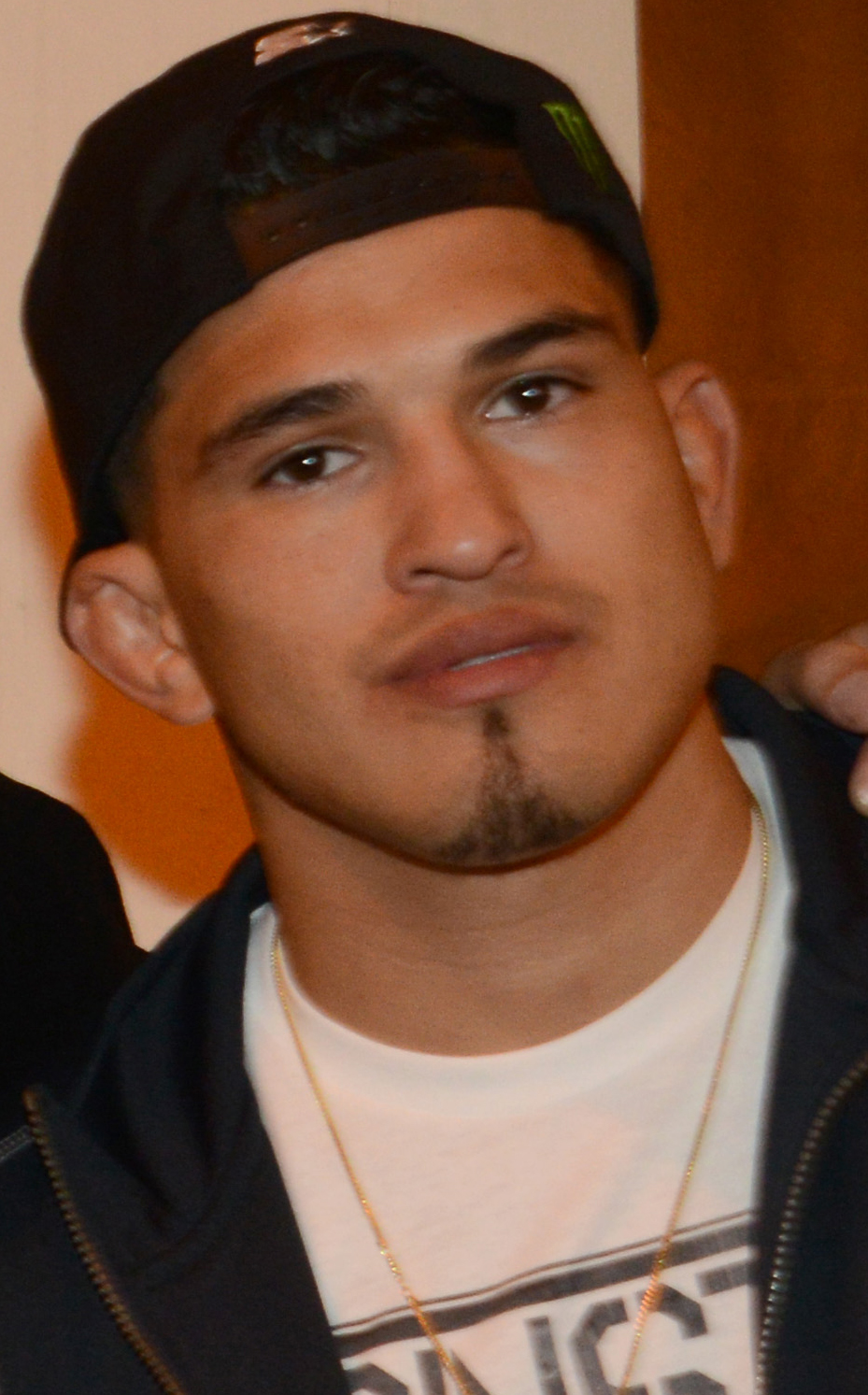
Roy Jones Jr. (left) and Anthony Pettis (right).

On February 6, 2023, Jorge Masvidal announced on The MMA Hour that Roy Jones Jr. would face former UFC Lightweight champion Anthony Pettis in a professional boxing match on April 1, 2023. Masvidal also announced on the co-main event that former UFC Light Heavyweight champion Vitor Belfort would be facing former Strikeforce Middleweight champion Ronaldo "Jacare" Souza. The pair previously fought under the MMA rules set at UFC 198, where Souza won via TKO in the first round. The card also featured UFC Hall of Famer José Aldo take on fellow MMA veteran Jeremy Stephens. The pair also previously fought in MMA at UFC on Fox: Alvarez vs. Poirier 2 where Aldo would win the fight via TKO by body shot in the first round.

The event was originally planned to have a bout between former UFC and Bellator title contender Paul Daley and Anthony Taylor. However, Taylor withdrew from the bout for unknown reasons and was replaced by Markus Perez. In turn, Daley was forced to withdraw from the bout due to visa issues and was replaced by Joe Riggs on less than week's notice.

The fight marked Jones' 76th professional fight and Pettis' debut. Jones said his motivation to return to the ring was due to his long-standing desire to fight former MMA legend Anderson Silva, whom he tried to make a fight with before announcing his retirement in 2018. Jones explained that he found Pettis intriguing due to his unique and creative fighting style, acknowledging his achievements in MMA. - Pettis was training seriously and sparring with experienced boxers, notably former world champion Caleb Plant. Jones also wanted to provide Pettis with valuable boxing experience.

== The fight ==
Pettis defeated Jones via majority decision after eight-rounds, with scores of 76-76, 77-75, and 78-74. The fight was competitive and packed with action throughout. Pettis was aggressive, attempting to control the pace and keep Jones on the ropes during the opening rounds. Jones managed to use angles and counters to land point-scoring shots and occasionally gain the upper hand The fight saw high punch volume from Pettis and several exchanges where Jones skill and ring IQ shone through. Both utilised body shots and head combinations throughout. Pettis’ busier style and punch output arguably contributed to him winning on two of the three scorecards.

Post-fight, Pettis praised Jones, calling him a legend and stating it was an honor to share the ring with him. He acknowledged the challenge but was excited about his pro boxing debut and potential future bouts. Jones was gracious in defeat, noting that entertaining fans was a priority. He expressed interest in a potential rematch, stating Pettis would have gained experience from the fight.

== Fight card ==
Weight Class		vs.		Method	Round	Time	Notes
Cruiserweight	Anthony Pettis	def.	Roy Jones Jr.	MD	8
Heavyweight	Vitor Belfort	def.	Ronaldo Souza	UD	6
Welterweight	José Aldo	vs.	Jeremy Stephens	MD	6
Featherweight	Gina Mazany	def.	Pearl Gonzalez	MD	6
Bantamweight	Bi Nguyen	def.	Andy Nguyen	UD	4
Super lightweight	Luis Feliciano	def.	Clarence Booth	UD	8
Super featherweight	Devin Cushing	def.	Damian Marchiano	TKO	3 (8)	2:59
Heavyweight	Dillon Klecker	def.	Josh Burns	TKO	1 (6)	3:00
Undercard
Super featherweight	Javier Zamarron	def.	Roberto Armas	UD	4
Welterweight	Cade Howell	def.	Christopher Wingate	UD	4
Lightweight	Danielle Cohen	def.	Danielle Wynn	UD	4
Cruiserweight	Markus Perez	def.	Joe Riggs	TKO	3 (4)	1:19
Cruiserweight	Mandeep Jangra	def.	Ryan Reber	RTD	2 (4)	3:00

== Purses ==
The amounts reflect the disclosed payouts only and do not include any off-contract bonuses, sponsor payments, or discretionary bonuses.

Guaranteed base purses:

- Anthony Pettis ($650,000) def. Roy Jones Jr. ($700,000)
- Vitor Belfort ($400,000) def. Ronaldo Souza ($200,000)
- José Aldo ($425,000) vs. Jeremy Stephens ($200,000)
- Luis Feliciano ($25,000) def. Clarence Booth ($10,000)
- Devin Cushing ($40,000) def. Damian David Machiano ($5,000)
- Gina Mazany ($10,000) def. Pearl Gonzalez ($50,000)
- Dillon Cleckler ($40,000) def. Josh Burns ($15,000)
- Bi Nguyen ($15,000) def. Andy Nguyen ($5,000)
- Markus Perez ($15,000) def. Joe Riggs ($10,000)
- Mandeep Jangra ($1,000) def. Ryan Reber ($1,000)
- Javier Zamarron ($1,200) def. Roberto Armas ($1,000)
- Cade Howell ($3,500) def. Christopher Wingate ($1,500)
- Danielle Cohen ($2,000) def. Danielle Wynn ($1,500)

== Broadcasting ==
Country/region	Broadcaster		
Country/region	Free to air	Cable/pay television	PPV
United States (host)	—N/a	In Demand	In Demand & UFC Fight Pass
Internationally	—N/a	—N/a	In Demand & UFC Fight Pass
