= BoxingScene =

Boxing websites

- Website type: Sports, Boxing
- Available in: English
- Owner: ProBox TV
- Founder: Rick Reeno
- Editors: Lance Pugmire, David Greisman, Matt Christie
- CEO: Garry Jonas
- Industry: Sports media
- Website: boxingscene.com
- Commercial: Yes
- Registration: Optional (required for forum posting)
- Launched: 2003

YouTube information
- Channel: BoxingScene
- Subscribers: 62.3 thousand
- Views: 4.5 million
- Last updated: June 2, 2026

BoxingScene is a boxing news website that provides breaking news, analysis, and coverage of bouts across all levels of the sport. It was founded in 2003 by Rick Reeno, and has been owned by ProBox TV since 2024. As of 2025, the website attracts more than one million unique visitors per month, with continued growth.

== History ==
BoxingScene was founded in September 2003 by current Ring magazine CEO Rick Reeno. In June 2018, CBS Sports Digital announced it had acquired BoxingScene, but would continue under the management of Reeno. In February 2024, the outlet was sold to ProBox TV and continued operations under the leadership of its CEO, Garry Jonas.

== Awards ==
Senior U.S. writer Lance Pugmire received the Nat Fleischer Award for Excellence in Boxing Journalism from the Boxing Writers Association of America in 2022. At the 2024 Bernie Writing Awards, BoxingScene staff members earned a total of 18 awards across first-, second-, and third-place finishes, as well as honorable mentions. In the 2025 Bernie Writing Awards, BoxingScene repeated as the overall winner, with 11 total places in the overall voting. Its first-place winners included Eric Raskin in the Boxing Column category, Lance Pugmire in Boxing News Story, and Tris Dixon in Boxing Feature under 1,500 words.

== See also ==
- BoxRec
- The Ring
- Bloody Elbow
- Fightmag
- Boxing News
