= Nick Curson =

American strength and conditioning coach

- Born: Nicholas Curson; 1973 (age 52–53)
- Occupations: Strength and conditioning coach

Nicholas Curson (born 1973) is an American strength and conditioning coach (S&C coach), founder of Speed Of Sport gym in Torrance, California. Curson has been involved with various S&C training modalities since the mid-1990s, as a Brazilian jiu-jitsu (BJJ) practitioner, competitor and instructor. Since late 2009, he has specialized in Eastern Bloc influenced Marinovich Training Systems and works closely with Russian–born neuroscientist and neurophysiologist Dr. Igor Lavrov of the S.M. Kirov Military Medical Academy and currently a Mayo Clinic principal researcher. Curson describes himself as a sports performance specialist, since he is not credentialed with a Certified Strength and Conditioning Specialist (CSCS) certificate.

== Professional background ==
Curson started training in Brazilian jiu-jitsu (BJJ) in 1995, for the first four years under Rickson Gracie, and gained his blue belt. He received his black belt in 2007 and his 1st degree in 2010, both under Rigan Machado.

In 2008 he founded Unity Jiu Jitsu (UJJ) Academy in Redondo Beach, California and was teaching BJJ. Some of his students have gone on to win medals in BJJ World, Pan-American and US National championships as well as other tournaments.

Curson has been involved with various S&C training modalities as a BJJ practitioner and instructor. Examples include classic weight training, kettlebells, and crossfit.

While taking on the role of a training partner for MMA fighter B.J. Penn in preparation for Penn's December 12, 2009 UFC lightweight championship fight on UFC 107, Curson got exposed to the Marinovich-based Neuromuscular Intensification System (NIS) training program and became "hooked" and a "believer". Penn's S&C program under head trainer Marv Marinovich was at Gavin MacMillan's Sport Science Lab (SSL) in San Juan Capistrano, California. In March 2010, Curson started the SSL Affiliate Program and proceeded to get certified in most of the Neuromuscular Intensification System various elements. becoming a certified NIS personal trainer.

Curson started offering the NIS S&C program at Unity Jiu Jitsu Academy. From mid-2011 Curson gradually shifted from BJJ instructor + S&C trainer, to S&C inclusive trainer. By March 2012 Unity Jiu Jitsu Academy was permanently closed. Curson instead founded Speed Of Sport Gym at the same location, later moving the gym to Torrance, California.

Speed Of Sport is not affiliated with MacMillan and Sport Science Lab . Curson is a protégé of the brothers Marv and Gary Marinovich (Marinovich Training Systems), who, since late 2011, were training out of Integrated Martial Sciences Academy (IMS Academy) in Live Oak, Santa Cruz County, California and sometimes at Noble-Moreno Boxing Gym in Watsonville, California.

== Training method ==
Curson consults with physiologists and sports biomechanics experts in formulating a conditioning program for his athletes.

His training techniques are based on plyometrics and ballistic modalities with a physioball modification. He works on speed, flexibility and stamina. He employs fast-twitch muscle training in the swimming pool, downhill sprinting, hypoxic altitude simulation, motor coordination and kinesthetic awareness exercises. Significant attention is given to foot strengthening exercises.

On The Joe Rogan Experience podcast he explained how he's against traditional squats, bench press, deadlift, etc., against slow resistance training, and against the use of kettlebells for explosive sports like MMA and boxing. Curson has stated: "Weight training with heavy loads has been scientifically proven to be detrimental to boxers' speed, force, and accuracy", and in reference to elite level athletes, "Lift heavy and YOU WILL lose efficiency, economy of movement…guaranteed". Kickboxer Joe Schilling stated that Curson's exercises were hard and difficult, but didn't break him down like other S&C systems, noting the emphasis in Curson's system of not overtraining.

Curson opposes the use of performance–enhancing drugs (PEDs), stating his clients only take multivitamins and nutrients from natural food.

== Notable clients ==
Curson has trained multiple Olympian, World, International, National and Collegiate Champions from different sports. Examples of his clientele include::

- Professional Boxers - Nonito Donaire, Donnie Nietes, Arthur Villanueva Rey Bautista, Ruslan Provodnikov, Milan Melindo, Taras Shelestyuk and female amateur boxer Mikaela Mayer.
- Mixed martial arts (MMA) fighters - Lyoto Machida, Fabricio Werdum, Rafael Dos Anjos, Jon Tuck and Jake Ellenberger.
- Muay Thai kickboxer Joe Schilling, professional baseball player Kurt Suzuki, competition swimmer Conor Dwyer, freestyle wrestler Aaron Pico and professional surfer Nic Lamb.

== Awards ==
- World MMA Awards
  - 2017 Trainer of the Year award
  - 2018 Trainer of the Year award
