= Fightmag =

Media outlet

FIGHTMAG
- Type: News, Online media
- Purpose: Sports journalism, covering boxing, mixed martial arts (MMA), other combat sports, and entertainment
- Region served: Worldwide
- Services: Sports media, Entertainment
- Official language: English
- Website: fightmag.com

Fightmag (stylized as FIGHTMAG) is a news media outlet covering combat sports, including boxing, mixed martial arts (MMA) and bare-knuckle boxing. It publishes news, event coverage, results, photos and videos.

== Content ==
=== News Coverage ===
The News section of Fightmag provides comprehensive coverage of combat sports. It features breaking news, event information, fight results, photos and videos.

Coverage includes major events, international promotions, as well as emerging and regional events. The section is organized by sport - for example, Boxing and MMA - and includes news, real-time results and updates. The site is updated on a daily basis.

=== Event Schedule ===
The Schedule section of Fightmag lists upcoming combat sports events, including boxing, MMA and bare-knuckle fighting. Events are presented chronologically and include information such as the event name, date, location, matchups and broadcast details.

The section is regularly updated to reflect new announcements, cancellations and schedule changes.

=== Champions ===
The Champions section on Fightmag lists current titleholders across major combat sports organizations. This includes boxing sanctioning bodies such as the IBF, WBA, WBC, and WBO, as well as UFC in mixed martial arts and BKFC in bare-knuckle fighting.

The listings are updated to reflect title changes across weight divisions.

== Citations in Media ==
Fightmag has been cited by various international publications, including general news outlets and sports-focused media:

=== Africa ===
- Morocco World News (Morocco)
- The Punch (Nigeria)

=== Asia ===
- CNN Indonesia (Indonesia)
- Nur.kz (Kazakhstan)
- Sindonews.com (Indonesia)
- Tokyo Sports (Japan)
- Tribunnews.com (Indonesia)

=== Europe ===
- 24 Kanal (Ukraine)
- Daily Express (UK)
- Iltalehti (Finland)
- Korrespondent.net (Ukraine)
- Manchester Evening News (UK)
- Net.hr (Croatia)
- Talksport (UK)
- Tribuna.com (Ukraine)
- TheMacLife (Ireland)

=== North America ===
- Audacy (US)
- BoxingScene (US)
- DAZN (US)
- International Business Times (US)
- Maxim (US)
- Screen Rant (Canada)
- The Sporting News (US)

=== Oceania ===
- The West Australian (Australia)

== See also ==
- BoxRec
- BoxingScene
- Boxing News
- The Ring
- MMA Fighting
- MMAjunkie.com
- Bloody Elbow
