= UFC 179 =

UFC mixed martial arts event in 2014

UFC 179: Aldo vs. Mendes 2
- The poster for UFC 179: Aldo vs. Mendes 2
- Promotion: Ultimate Fighting Championship
- Date: October 25, 2014
- Venue: Ginásio do Maracanãzinho
- City: Rio de Janeiro, Brazil
- Attendance: 11,415
- Buyrate: 180,000

Event chronology
UFC Fight Night: MacDonald vs. Saffiedine	UFC 179: Aldo vs. Mendes 2	UFC Fight Night: Rockhold vs. Bisping

UFC 179: Aldo vs. Mendes 2 was a mixed martial arts event held on October 25, 2014, at Ginásio do Maracanãzinho in Rio de Janeiro, Brazil.

== Background ==
The event was headlined by a Featherweight Championship rematch between the current champion José Aldo, and top contender Chad Mendes. Their first fight at UFC 142, also contested in Rio de Janeiro, ended in a first round knockout victory in favor of Aldo.

The headliner was originally scheduled to take place on August 2, 2014, at UFC 176. However, on July 2, Aldo pulled out of the fight citing a neck injury suffered during training. Subsequent to Aldo's injury, that event was postponed on July 8, when the UFC announced they were unable to replace the original main event fight and with less than a month before the event, the decision was made to postpone the event – though the promotion said the numbering scheme for already scheduled pay-per-views after it, including UFC 177 in Sacramento on August 30, would remain in consecutive order. That entire fight card was re-booked for other events.

Jeremy Stephens was linked to a possible bout with Lucas Martins at the event. However, Stephens' manager indicated shortly after the fight announcement was leaked that they had no intention of taking the fight. Martins faced Darren Elkins instead.

Fabrício Camões was originally scheduled to face Josh Shockley at the event. However, Shockley was removed from the bout citing injury and was replaced by Anthony Rocco Martin.

Alan Patrick was expected to face Beneil Dariush at this event. However, Patrick was forced to pull out due to a broken jaw he received during training. Dariush instead faced Carlos Diego Ferreira.

During weigh ins, three fighters missed weight: Scott Jorgensen (128 lb), Fabrício Camões (158 lb) and Tony Martin (157 lb). Jorgensen was fined 20% of his purse, while Camões and Martin, who were involved in the same fight, were not issued a fine.

== Results ==
Main card
Weight class				Method	Round	Time	Notes
Featherweight	José Aldo (c)	def.	Chad Mendes	Decision (unanimous) (49–46, 49–46, 49–46)	5	5:00	(Note: For the UFC Featherweight Championship.)
Light Heavyweight	Phil Davis	def.	Glover Teixeira	Decision (unanimous) (30–27, 30–27, 30–27)	3	5:00
Light Heavyweight	Fábio Maldonado	def.	Hans Stringer	TKO (punches)	2	4:06
Featherweight	Darren Elkins	def.	Lucas Martins	Decision (split) (27–30, 30–27, 30–27)	3	5:00
Lightweight	Beneil Dariush	def.	Carlos Diego Ferreira	Decision (unanimous) (30–27, 30–27, 30–27)	3	5:00
Preliminary card (Fox Sports 1)
Welterweight	Neil Magny	def.	William Macário	TKO (punches)	3	2:40
Lightweight	Yan Cabral	def.	Naoyuki Kotani	Submission (rear-naked choke)	2	3:06
Catchweight (128 lb)	Wilson Reis	def.	Scott Jorgensen	Submission (arm-triangle choke)	1	3:28
Featherweight	Andre Fili	def.	Felipe Arantes	Decision (unanimous) (29–28, 29–28, 29–28)	3	5:00
Preliminary card (UFC Fight Pass)
Lightweight	Gilbert Burns	def.	Christos Giagos	Submission (armbar)	1	4:57
Catchweight (158 lb)	Anthony Rocco Martin	def.	Fabrício Camões	Submission (kimura)	1	4:16

== Bonus awards ==
The following fighters received $50,000 bonuses:

- Fight of the Night: José Aldo vs. Chad Mendes
- Performance of the Night: Fábio Maldonado and Gilbert Burns

== See also ==
- List of UFC events
- 2014 in UFC
