= Bad Boy (brand) =

American alternative sport and lifestyle brand

- Industry: MMA, skate, surf, motocross
- Founded: 1982
- Headquarters: San Diego, California, United States
- Area served: United States, Canada, Brazil, South Africa, Japan, Australia, Thailand
- Key people: Mauricio Rua, Demian Maia, Chris Weidman, Roger Huerta, Diego Sanchez, Junior dos Santos, Mario Yamasaki, Paulo Thiago, Erick Silva, Xande Ribeiro, Alexander Gustafsson, Brandon Vera, Marcus Conroy
- Products: Apparel, athletic equipment
- Website: http://www.badboy.com

Bad Boy is an American alternative sport and lifestyle brand. They are notable for their presence in both fashion and performance equipment.

== About ==
Bad Boy provides action sport and combat sport athletes with performance products and apparel. Marcus first began producing T-shirts and shorts for local surfers, skaters and motocross riders in San Diego, California, in the early eighties. In the nineties, Bad Boy launched a combat sports line, starting with their sponsorship of Rickson Gracie, son of the founder of Brazilian jiu-jitsu, Helio Gracie, for a seminar that he was giving in Rio de Janeiro. The seminar made the cover story in a national magazine and the cover photo featured Rickson wearing a Bad Boy gi. As Jiu Jitsu continued to grow in Brazil, Bad Boy continued to sponsor both the Gracies and Jiu Jitsu tournaments.

Other martial art academies in Brazil, most notably Luta Livre, took notice of the success and popularity of Jiu Jitsu and a war of words began, wherein Jiu Jitsu was denounced as a fad and not as effective as was publicized. In order to settle the debate, the first Mixed Martial Arts tournaments, then called Vale Tudo, sprung up throughout Brazil and Bad Boy was first in line to support the sport.

As the sport grew, it became apparent that the gi and traditional gear were hindering the performance of many athletes. Bad Boy recognized this and created the first shorts designed for the needs of Vale Tudo fighters. The Vale Tudo (VT) shorts were based on the Sungão, which is the Brazilian word for the swim briefs favored on Brazil's beaches. Bad Boy added legs to the garment and were made of durable yet comfortable polyamide.

The Bad Boy branding is currently represented in the EU by https://web.archive.org/web/20161010125026/https://badboy.com/gb/en_gb/ selling MMA equipment and fight wear.

Bad Boy has won Best Technical Clothing Brand in the 2010 and 2011 World MMA Awards, and Best Lifestyle Clothing Brand in 2012.

== Historic fighters, trainers, and coaches ==
- Alexander Gustafsson
- Vitor Belfort
- Antônio Rogério Nogueira
- Antônio Rodrigo Nogueira
- Shogun Rua
- Joachim Hansen
- Mark Kerr
- Dan Henderson
- Frank Shamrock
- Ricardo Arona
- Wallid Ismail
- Rickson Gracie
- Renzo Gracie
- Mark Coleman
- Martin Kampmann
- Paulo Thiago
- Jake Shields
- Pedro Rizzo
- Bob Sapp
- Jerome Le Banner
- Dean Lister
- Wesley Correira
- Saulo Ribeiro
- Diego Sanchez
- Lyoto Machida
- Junior dos Santos
- Nino Schembri
- Jorge “Macaco” Patino
- Chris Weidman
- Kelvin Gastelum
- Stephen Thompson
- Michael Page

== See also ==
- Mixed martial arts clothing
