= MMA Fighting =

Mixed martial arts websites

MMAFighting.com

- Screenshot Screenshot for MMAFighting.com in April 2018
- Website type: Mixed martial arts news
- Available in: English
- Owner: Vox Media
- Creator: Ray Hui
- Website: www.MMAFighting.com
- Commercial: Yes
- Registration: Optional (required for comment posting)
- Launched: April 2001; 25 years ago
- Current status: Active

MMA Fighting is a news website that covers the sport of mixed martial arts (MMA). Founded in 2001, the site is notable for its breaking news coverage, podcast series, and The MMA Hour with Ariel Helwani.

== Overview ==
MMAFighting.com was launched by Ray Hui in 2001, initially as an Angelfire site.

In 2009, MMAFighting.com was acquired by AOL. In 2011, it was sold to their current owners, Vox Media, where they now are a part of SB Nation.

A 2 million unique users per month website reported in 2011, and currently the #3 most popular MMA media & news website worldwide according to Alexa Internet.

== Awards ==
In the World MMA Awards, MMA Fighting has won the award for "Media Source of the Year" a total of four times between 2015 and 2018. Additionally, MMA Fighting employee Ariel Helwani has won the award for "MMA Journalist of the Year" every year since 2010.

== The MMA Hour ==
The MMA Hour
- The logo for The MMA Hour since June 2017
- Genre: Talk
- Format: Audio; video
- Language: English

Creative team
- Created by: Ariel Helwani

Cast and voices
- Hosted by: Ariel Helwani

Music
- Opening theme: Ring Ring
- Composed by: Byron Brizuela

Production
- Production: Danny Segura
- Length: 4–5 hours

Publication
- No. of episodes: 453 (as of October 15, 2018)
- Original release: June 18, 2009

Related
- Website: www.mmafighting.com/mma-hour

MMA Fighting hosts The MMA Hour, a twice-weekly show hosted by Ariel Helwani, that features interviews with various names in mixed martial arts, including fighters, promoters, agents, coaches, and journalists.

The MMA Hour was hosted weekly by Ariel Helwani from June 2009 until June 2018. In June 2018, Luke Thomas took over as the host.

In June 2021, Helwani announced his return to MMA Fighting and Vox Media as host for The MMA Hour, with a new twice-weekly schedule. But in August 2024, Helwani fulfilled the contract between Spotify and MMA Fighting to move in to Yahoo Sports, where he would serve as the anchor of a new Combat Sports Vertical called Uncrowned. 2 months later, he hosted a three-times weekly show that features the same format, with the same tune as The MMA Hour.

== See also ==
- Bloody Elbow
- Fightmag
- Inside MMA
- MMAjunkie.com
- Sherdog
