= Nick Gallick =

American wrestler (born 1986)

Personal information
- Home town: Tucson, Arizona, U.S.

Sport
- Sport: Wrestling
- Event: Folkstyle
- College team: Iowa State Cyclones
Medal record
Collegiate Wrestling
Representing the Iowa State Cyclones
NCAA Division I Wrestling Championships
Bronze medal – third place	2009 St. Louis	141 lb

Nick Gallick (born April 1, 1986) is a former wrestler and a bronze medalist at the 2009 NCAA Wrestling Championship. Before his injury, Gallick was ranked No. 1 in the nation at 141 pounds and was a contender for the national title at his weight class.

== Biography ==
Nick Gallick is one of the four sons of parents Monty and Jodi Gallick. He was a Sunnyside High School wrestler, where he won four Arizona state championships from 2002 to 2005 and earned his place in the Arizona National Wrestling Hall of Fame. He started at 103 pounds in 2002 and 2003, went on to compete at 119 pounds in 2004, and 125 pounds in 2005. Furthermore, Gallick was named as one of the Best 2004-05 High School Seniors by Dan Fickel of the Wrestling USA Magazine.

Gallick attended college at the Iowa State University in 2005–2010. In 2008, Gallick won his first Big 12 Wrestling Championship title at 141 pounds when he defeated Nathan Morgan of Oklahoma State. In the same year, he defeated defending NCAA champion J Jaggers of Ohio State at the NWCA All-Star Classic. In 2009, Gallick secured his place as a top wrestler with a third-place finish at the 79th NCAA Championships and earned two-time All-American honors.

During his senior year, Gallick suffered a deep tissue bruise on his thigh at the Harold Nichols Open. The injury needed medical attention, which forced Gallick to sit out for a majority of the season.
