= Sherdog =

Mixed martial arts website

- Logo
- Company type: Sports media
- Website type: Mixed martial arts, sports
- Available in: English
- Owner: Evolve Media LLC
- Creator: Jeff Sherwood
- Website: sherdog.com
- Commercial: Yes
- Registration: Optional (required for forum posting)
- Launched: 1997; 29 years ago

Sherdog is an American website devoted to the sport of mixed martial arts (MMA). It also has many forums and discussion pages on the many topics of MMA like records, promotions, etc. The site is a member of the CraveOnline network and provides MMA related content for ESPN.com.

== History ==
Sherdog was created by photographer Jeff Sherwood (nicknamed "Sherdog") in 1997, and was later refined with the help of Garrett Poe. Sherdog features MMA news, individual records of fighters, reviews and previews of MMA events, interviews with fighters and referees, user forums, divisional and pound-for-pound fighter rankings, and original radio programs.

Sherdog is also home to the Sherdog Radio Network, an internet-only sports talk network featuring Sherdog writers and staffers. Weekly programs have included The Savage Dog Show hosted by Greg Savage and Jeff Sherwood, Beatdown hosted by TJ De Santis and a number of co-hosts, It's Time hosted by Bruce Buffer and The Jordan Breen Show.

The standard schedule originally included Beatdown on Monday, Wednesday and Friday, It's Time on Tuesdays, Cheap Seats on Tuesdays and Thursdays, and The SRN Rewind every Sunday evening. Also included for big events were Sherdog Radio Network Roundtables providing previews and "Beatdown After the Bell" for post-fight recaps.

As of April 8, 2016, the Sherdog Radio Network was rebuilt after Jeff Sherwood and his namesake website parted ways. The current lineup of programming includes Cheap Seats with Jordan Breen and Greg Savage on Mondays and Wednesdays which was cancelled after the organization and Greg Savage parted ways as well. TJ & The Tooth with TJ De Santis and Nick "The Tooth" Gullo on Tuesdays, and The Neutral Corner hosted by MMA veteran Yves Edwards. Still standard for high-profile events are Jack Encarnacao's SRN Roundtables providing previews and TJ De Santis' "Beatdown After the Bell" for post-fight recaps. While not officially a part of the Sherdog Radio Network, the SRN feed also includes Press Row audio blogs starring Jordan Breen and various guests in the world of MMA media. Jack Encarnacao's The SRN Rewind has been on an extended hiatus, and the flagship show Beatdown has been discontinued as a live radio show since the exiting of Jeff 'Sherdog' Sherwood.

Sherdog has affiliated with ESPN to provide extensive MMA content for their site. The deal includes ESPN sharing Sherdog's extensive Fight Finder database. The deal included the Sherdog Radio Network as part of ESPN's podcast center.

The website has a XenForo forum section composed of more than 60,000 members worldwide.

The site hosts free live streams of mixed martial arts events from organizations such as Palace Fighting Championships, Wargods and M-1 Global.

== See also ==
- HDNet
- ESPN
- Fightmag
- Inside MMA
- MMA Fighting
- Bloody Elbow
- MMAjunkie.com
- List of Internet forums
