= UFC 142 =

UFC mixed martial arts event in 2012

UFC 142: Aldo vs. Mendes
- The poster for UFC 142: Aldo vs. Mendes
- Promotion: Ultimate Fighting Championship
- Date: January 14, 2012
- Venue: HSBC Arena
- City: Rio de Janeiro, Brazil
- Attendance: 10,605
- Buyrate: 235,000

Event chronology
UFC 141: Lesnar vs. Overeem	UFC 142: Aldo vs. Mendes	UFC on FX: Guillard vs. Miller

UFC 142: Aldo vs. Mendes was a mixed martial arts event held by the Ultimate Fighting Championship on January 14, 2012, at the HSBC Arena in Rio de Janeiro, Brazil. It was the first UFC event of the year, and was broadcast live on pay-per-view in North America.

== Background ==
UFC 142 featured preliminary fights live on Sportsnet and FX.

Siyar Bahadurzada was scheduled to face Erick Silva, but pulled out of the bout. Veteran fighter Carlo Prater stepped in as a replacement for Bahadurzada.

Rob Broughton was scheduled to face Ednaldo Oliveira, but pulled out of the bout. Recently resigned heavyweight Gabriel Gonzaga replaced Broughton in the bout.

Paulo Thiago was scheduled to face Mike Pyle, but pulled out of the bout due to an injury. Recently resigned welterweight Ricardo Funch replaced Thiago in the bout.

Stanislav Nedkov was scheduled to take on Fabio Maldonado at this event, but visa problems forced Nedkov to withdraw from the bout. Newcomer Caio Magalhaes stepped in as a replacement for Nedkov in late December. However, Maldonado was injured less than a week before his fight with Magalhaes and the bout was scratched from the card.

At the UFC 142 weigh ins, Anthony Johnson failed to make the middleweight limit. Johnson came in 11 pounds over the 186 lb weight allowance, was fined 20 percent of his earnings and the bout was contested at a catchweight of 197 lb. However, Belfort requested that Johnson not weigh more than 205 lb the day of the fight. The UFC mandated that if Johnson could not make the 205 lb limit, the bout would be cancelled. Johnson officially weighed in at 204.2 lb on fight day, and the bout took place as scheduled.

== Results ==
Main card
Weight class				Method	Round	Time	Notes
Featherweight	José Aldo (c)	def.	Chad Mendes	KO (knee)	1	4:59	(Note: For the UFC Featherweight Championship.)
Catchweight (197 lb)	Vitor Belfort	def.	Anthony Johnson	Submission (rear-naked choke)	1	4:49
Middleweight	Rousimar Palhares	def.	Mike Massenzio	Submission (heel hook)	1	1:03
Welterweight	Carlo Prater	def.	Erick Silva	DQ (punches to the back of the head)	1	0:29
Lightweight	Edson Barboza	def.	Terry Etim	KO (wheel kick)	3	2:02
Preliminary card (FX)
Lightweight	Thiago Tavares	def.	Sam Stout	Decision (unanimous) (29–28, 30–27, 29–28)	3	5:00	(Note: This bout aired on the broadcast following the Gonzaga vs Oliveira bout.)
Heavyweight	Gabriel Gonzaga	def.	Ednaldo Oliveira	Submission (rear-naked choke)	1	3:22	(Note: This bout aired on the broadcast following the Pyle vs Funch bout.)
Featherweight	Iuri Alcântara	def.	Michihiro Omigawa	Decision (unanimous) (30–27, 29–28, 30–27)	3	5:00
Welterweight	Mike Pyle	def.	Ricardo Funch	TKO (knee and punches)	1	1:22	(Note: This bout aired on the broadcast following the Aldo vs Mendes bout.)
Preliminary card (Facebook)
Featherweight	Felipe Arantes	def.	Antonio Carvalho	Decision (unanimous) (29–28, 29–28, 29–28)	3	5:00

== Bonus awards ==
The following fighters received $65,000 bonuses.

- Fight of the Night: Edson Barboza vs. Terry Etim
- Submission of the Night: Rousimar Palhares
- Knockout of the Night: Edson Barboza

== See also ==
- List of UFC events
- 2012 in UFC
