= Bloody Elbow =

Website for martial arts and combat sports

BloodyElbow.com
- The official logo for Bloody Elbow, an independent combat sports website
- Website type: Mixed martial arts news
- Available in: English
- Owner: GRV Media
- Creator: Nate Wilcox
- Editor: Donagh Corby
- Website: bloodyelbow.com
- Commercial: Yes
- Registration: None
- Launched: February 2007; 19 years ago
- Current status: Active

Bloody Elbow is a news website that covers the sports of mixed martial arts (MMA), boxing, kickboxing, Brazilian Jiu-jitsu, and other traditional martial arts and combat sports. Founded in 2007, the site has been notable for its investigative reporting, breaking news coverage, opinion and analysis. Bloody Elbow operated as part of the SB Nation network of sports blogging sites owned by Vox Media until January 2023, when the blog separated from Vox and was acquired as an independent publication by its founding editor. One year later in March 2024 the website was sold to GRV Media. The website is a part of the growing collection of MMA focused media outlets and provides analysis as well as commentary of multiple aspects of MMA.

== Overview ==
Founder Nate Wilcox (Kid Nate) recruited Luke Thomas to help run Bloody Elbow on May 21, 2007. Thomas worked as editor in chief of Bloody Elbow until 2011. Brent Brookhouse served as Bloody Elbow's managing editor from 2011 to 2015, before being replaced by Anton Tabuena from 2015 to March 2024.

Called "critically acclaimed" by the New York Post, Bloody Elbow was reviewed as one of the best MMA news & media blogs online. Currently it is the third most popular MMA media & news website in the US, according to Similarweb. In 2017, Bloody Elbow editor Karim Zidan appeared on an episode of HBO's Real Sports with Bryant Gumbel to discuss his work covering Chechen dictator Ramzan Kadyrov's influence in the world of mixed martial arts. The New York Times cited Bloody Elbow in a June 2023 article detailing Meta CEO Mark Zuckerberg competing in a Brazilian Jiu-jitsu tournament. In the same month, Vox included statements from Wilcox on the MMA fans of younger generations in an editorial piece examining rumors of a future official cage fight occurring between Zuckerberg and Twitter CEO Elon Musk. In July 2023, in an article about combat sports audiences, The New Yorker quoted Wilcox while identifying the Ultimate Fighting Championship's predatory business practices aimed at their fighters. The following month, Jacobin quoted a Bloody Elbow featured post in an August article detailing UFC president Dana White's Power Slap fighting series and its integration into the UFC's event programming. A week later, Ariel Helwani cited Bloody Elbow on The MMA Hour when asked about the ongoing UFC class-action lawsuit.

Among Bloody Elbow's regular contributors was Eugene S. Robinson, lead singer of the band Oxbow. Other notable contributors to Bloody Elbow have included UFC veterans such as the late Josh Samman, women's MMA pioneer Roxanne Modafferi, and Ben Saunders. Over the years Bloody Elbow has featured interviews with hundreds of professional MMA fighters as well as characters outside of the sport including Anthony Bourdain and Ed O'Neill. In October 2023, Bloody Elbow art director Chris Rini was featured in an article by the Copenhagen Post concerning Danish culture and female violence in the MMA sphere.

In January 2023, Bloody Elbow almost became defunct when Wilcox and other Bloody Elbow editorial staff were laid off by Vox Media in a wave of company downsizing that primarily affected Vox-affiliated sports publications. Following a series of discussions with Vox, Wilcox acquired the rights to Bloody Elbow and purchased the site from its former parent media company in March. Bloody Elbow was removed from Vox's content management system in the process, and Wilcox recruited seven web developers through a public online request for help with establishing the blog and its content on a new platform. During the redevelopment of Bloody Elbow, the payroll and operation expenses of the site were funded by reader donations, paid subscriptions, and Wilcox himself. After the site's migration and transfer of ownership, most of the original Bloody Elbow editorial staff were retained and continued to publish content for the mixed martial arts blog.

In March 2024, GRV Media acquired the website and social media assets of Bloody Elbow. No staff or contributors moved across to GRV following the sale. A month after the acquisition, GRV Media hired Donagh Corby and announce the formation of a Bloody Combat Sports Group which incorporated Bloody Elbow (MMA/UFC), Bloody Knockout (Boxing) and Bloody Slam (Wrestling). Following the acquisition, the popularity of Bloody Elbow continued to grow. In October 2024 the site achieved a record high of over 4.3m unique users

Known for investigative reporting, Bloody Elbow has been among the first to uncover and report in-depth on the finances of MMA promotions such as the Ultimate Fighting Championship, Bellator MMA, and ONE Championship. Bloody Elbow was also first to report and go in-depth on the major class-action antitrust lawsuit filed against the UFC by its fighters, who are calling for "fair" business practices and better pay. Bloody Elbow is among a number of media organizations and professionals that are currently blacklisted by the Ultimate Fighting Championship. The website has been a useful resource for academics studying MMA culture and trends.

== Awards ==
Bloody Elbow has been nominated as Media Source of the Year at the World MMA Awards in 2014, 2015, 2017, 2018 2019 and 2023. Brent Brookhouse was nominated for MMA Journalist of the Year at the World MMA Awards in 2016. Karim Zidan was nominated for MMA Journalist of the Year at the World MMA Awards in 2017, 2018 and 2019.

== See also ==
- MMA Fighting
- MMAjunkie.com
- Sherdog
