= MMA Junkie =

Mixed martial arts websites

MMAjunkie.com
- Website type: Sports, mixed martial arts
- Available in: English
- Owner: Gannett Company
- Creators: Dann Stupp, Eric Foster, Tom Cummins
- Industry: Sports media
- Website: mmajunkie.com
- Commercial: Yes
- Registration: Optional (required for forum posting)
- Launched: 2006

MMA Junkie is a news website that covers the sport of mixed martial arts (MMA). It was founded in 2006, and has been owned by Gannett Company since 2011. The site and its content have been featured in Time magazine, ESPN The Magazine, The New York Times, Fox Sports Net's The Best Damn Sports Show Period, Fox Report, Inside MMA, ESPN's MMA Live, Yahoo! and other media outlets.

== Overview ==
A variety of guest columnists and bloggers have been featured such as Ryan Bader (The Ultimate Fighter 8), C.B. Dollaway (The Ultimate Fighter 7) and Brendan Schaub (The Ultimate Fighter 10).

Radio show

MMA Junkie Radio is a weekly Internet radio show broadcast from Las Vegas, Nevada. MMAjunkie Radio resulted from the acquisition and re-branding of TAGG Radio (Trigg And Gorgeous George), which launched in 2007 and formed a content partnership with MMAjunkie in 2008. The live Internet radio show and podcast was renamed MMA Junkie Radio in early 2009. The show is hosted by "Gorgeous" George Garcia, Brian "Goze" Garcia and MMAjunkie lead staff reporter John Morgan, the show broadcasts Monday-Friday with occasional weekend and evening "Primetime" specials. Although once produced from a home studio, the show moved in 2009 to its new studio at the Race & Sports Book inside The Mandalay Bay Resort & Casino.

The two-hour show is a guest-driven program that features some of the most prominent fighters, trainers, promoters and officials in the sport. Additionally, Morgan and other members of the MMA Junkie editorial team frequently discuss and break the latest MMA news on the program.

== Awards ==
- 2008 Best Media Coverage by Fighters Only Magazine's World Mixed Martial Arts Awards
- 2009 Best Media Coverage
- 2009 Best MMA Journalist (John Morgan)
- 2010 Media Source of the Year
- 2011 Media Source of the Year
- 2014 Media Source of the Year

== See also ==
- Bloody Elbow
- Fightmag
- MMA Fighting
- Sherdog
