= Arianny Celeste =

American model (born 1985)

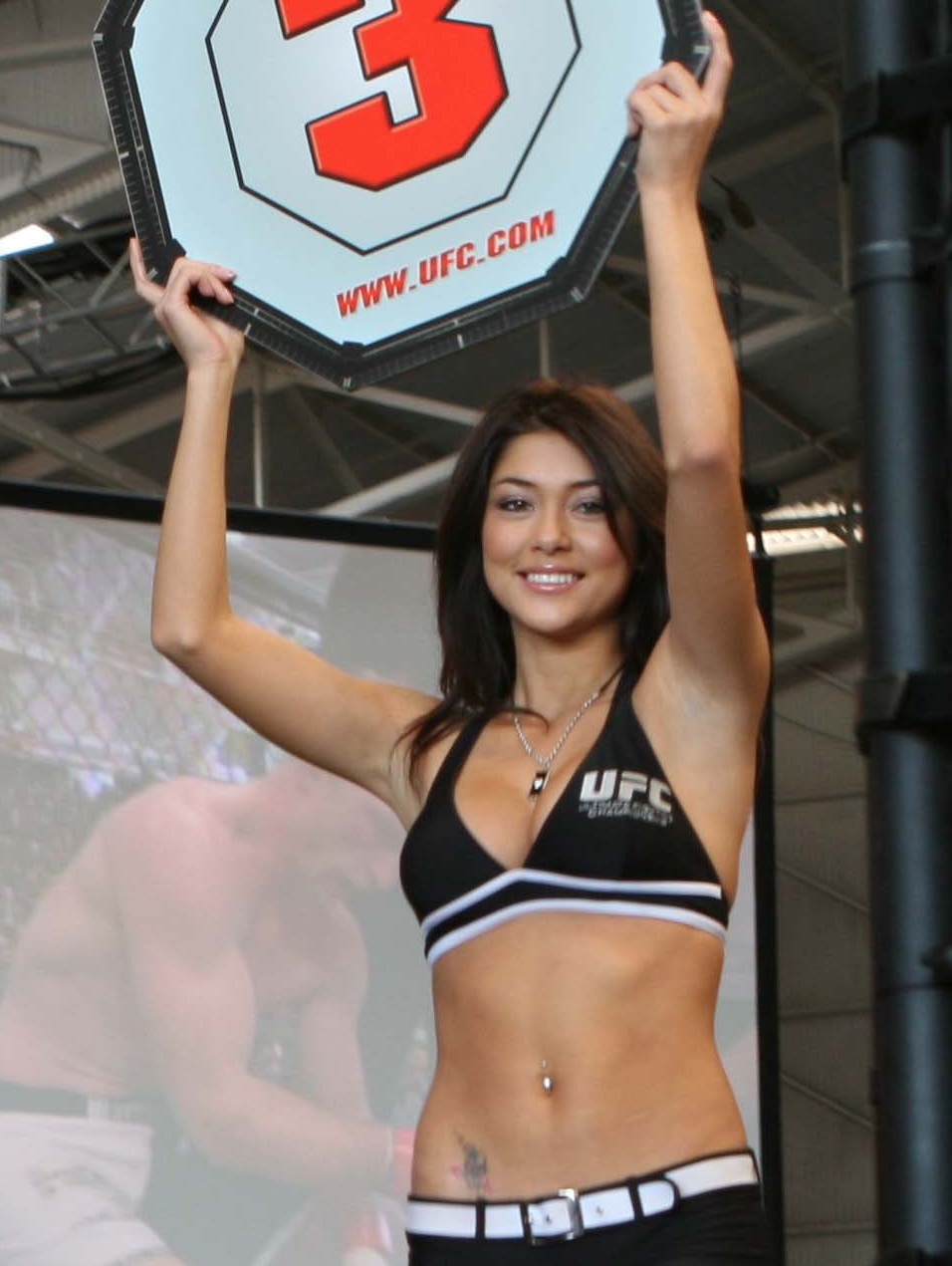
- Born: Penelope López Márquez; November 12, 1985 (age 40); Las Vegas, Nevada, U.S.
- Occupations: Model; Octagon Girl
- Years active: 2006–present
- Height: 5 ft 5 in (165 cm)
- Website: ariannyceleste.com

Arianny Celeste (born Penelope López Márquez on November 12, 1985) (/æriˈɑːni/) is a former American ring girl and model. She was also a co-host on the automotive reality television series Overhaulin' and has been featured in Playboy magazine.

== Early life ==
Celeste was born on November 12, 1985, in Las Vegas, Nevada. She is of Mexican and Filipino descent. "Arianny" is a nickname she was given as a child. She attended Eldorado High School and attended college at UNLV, where she majored in fitness management and nutrition.

== Career ==
=== As ring girl ===
Celeste made her UFC debut in 2006 at the Hard Rock Hotel and Casino in Paradise, Nevada.

She was voted "2006 Ring Girl of the Year" by Fighter's Only Magazine.

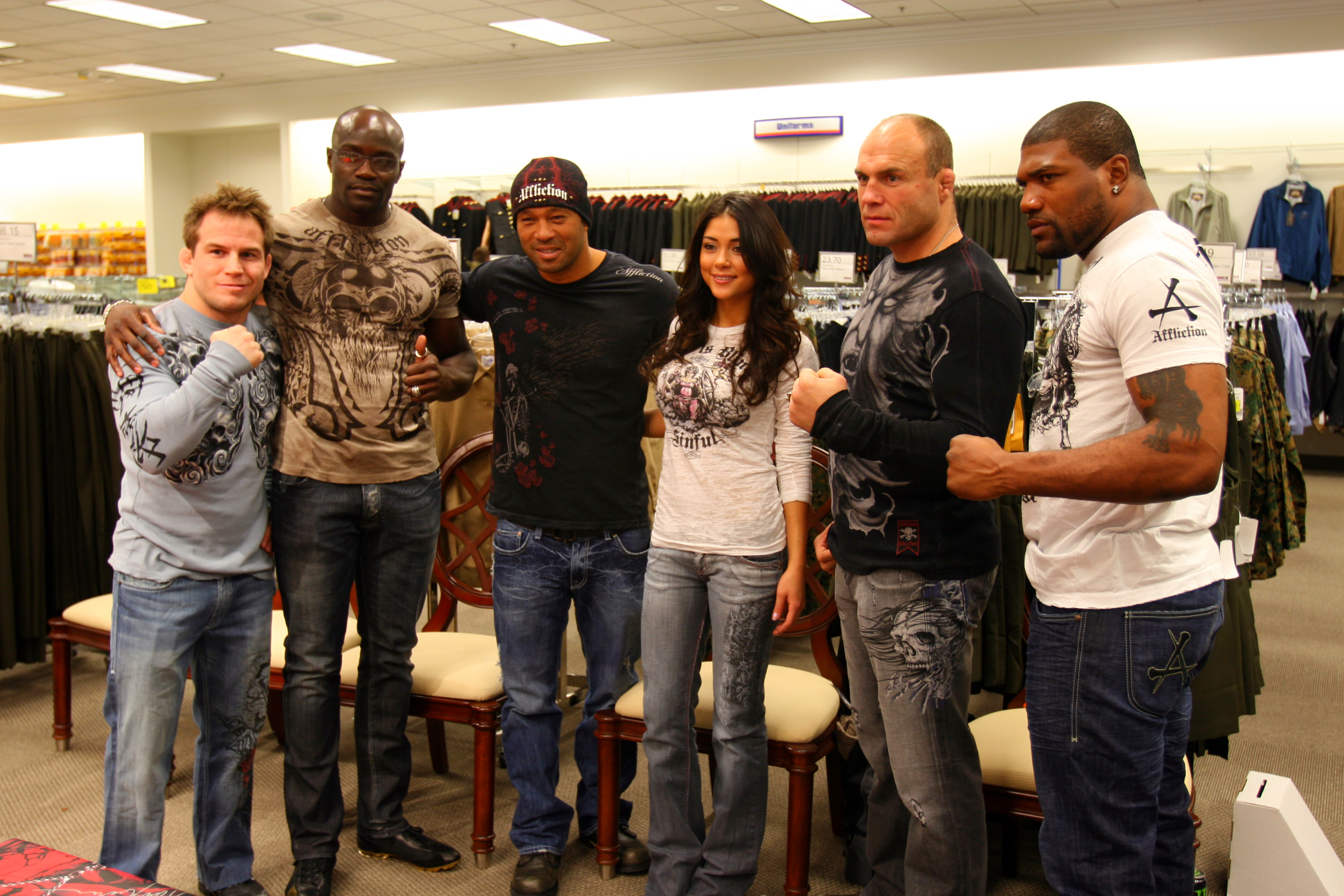
Celeste during the UFC Affliction autograph signing at Marine Corps Air Station Miramar in 2008

In 2008, at the first World MMA Awards, Celeste was voted "2008 Ring Girl of the Year".

In 2009, she won her second consecutive title at the 2nd World MMA Awards as Celeste become the "2009 Ring Girl of the Year".

In 2010, Celeste became the World MMA Awards "2010 Ring Girl of the Year", making it her third consecutive title.

At the 4th World MMA Awards in 2011, Celeste was voted the "2011 Ring Girl of the Year" again beating Brittney Palmer. This made it her 4th consecutive award.

In 2012, Celeste was nominated for the "2012 Ring Girl of the Year" award at the World MMA Awards. Celeste lost out to Brittney Palmer who became the first person other than Celeste to win the award.

Celeste was nominated again in 2013 as she looked to win the "Ring Girl of the Year" crown back from Palmer. Celeste further lost out to Palmer. This was Celeste's second consecutive loss.

In 2014, Celeste and Palmer were both nominated for the "2014 Ring Girl of the Year" at the World MMA Awards. Celeste regained her title as the "Ring Girl of the Year" making it her fifth time to have won the award and setting a new record.

In 2015, former UFC bantamweight champion Ronda Rousey argued "Either the ring card girls are paid too much, or the fighters aren't paid enough." UFC ring girls are reportedly paid $18,000 a year. This excludes jobs outside the UFC, like modeling. Arianny Celeste protested, calling Rousey a "big bully". Celeste argued that being a ring girl is harder than it seems.

=== As model ===
Celeste has modeled for magazines such as Maxim, FHM, Playboy, Sports Illustrated, and Fighter's Only Magazine.

On February 4, 2010, Sports Illustrated named her "Lady of The Day."

Maxim voted her "The Hottest UFC Octagon Girl" in the May 2010 issue where she was featured as the cover model. Arianny also appears in Maxim's Hot 100 list for 2010, 2011, 2012, 2013 and 2014; she placed #23, #69, #58, #18 and #59 respectively on the list.

Celeste posed nude for the November 2010 issue of Playboy, which was one of top-selling issues that year.

=== As host ===
The UFC premiered a new weekly, web-only show called UFC Ultimate Insider on July 29, 2010. Celeste serves as host for the show, with Joe Rogan interviewing various UFC fighters. It also features updates on upcoming matches, PPV's, as well as highlights from previous events. The first episode featured a new photo shoot with Celeste.

Celeste was the co-host of TV series Overhaulin'. She appeared in seven episodes from 2014 to 2015.

=== Others ===
Hooters invited Celeste to be a judge at the 2011 Hooters International Swimsuit Pageant. Celeste is featured as an Octagon girl in the video games UFC 2009 Undisputed, UFC Undisputed 2010, UFC Undisputed 3, EA Sports UFC and EA Sports UFC 2.

== Charity ==
In September 2009, high school senior Conner Cordova, a fan of mixed martial arts, asked Celeste to attend his prom with him in a series of three YouTube videos. Celeste agreed, provided that he found a date for her friend. However, Celeste was unable to appear due to her schedule, so the plan changed to attending another dance. That also proved impossible, so Cordova and Celeste sponsored their own event, which doubled as a fundraiser for victims of the 2010 Haiti earthquake.

In 2013, Celeste, along with female mixed martial artists from various promotions, auctioned their sports bras on eBay to raise money for breast cancer research.

During the COVID-19 pandemic, she organized a GoFundMe fundraiser to provide medical Protective equipment for the Centennial Hospital in Las Vegas and other related hospitals.

== Personal life ==
On May 26, 2012, Celeste was arrested in Las Vegas with her then-boyfriend, Praveen Chandra. She was charged with domestic violence with regards to an alleged fight with Chandra. Celeste posted a $3,000 bond and was released at 7:00 pm PT. She was expected to have a hearing in Nevada on July 2, 2012. Chandra accused Celeste of kicking him in the nose. However, Celeste indicated Chandra also choked her several times during the evening. Both were arrested in a Wynn Las Vegas hotel room.

== Filmography ==
=== Television ===
Year	Title	Role	Notes
2010	FightZone Presents	Herself	Special guest
2010	Cubed	Herself	Special guest
2010	MMA H.E.A.T.	Herself	Special guest
2011	2011 Hooters International Swimsuit Pageant	Herself	Judge
2011	MMAthletics	Herself	Special guest
2012	Tosh.0	Herself	Special guest
2012	The Burn with Jeff Ross	Herself	Special guest
2012–2013	UFC Ultimate Insider	Herself	Host for 4 episodes
2013	AXS Live	Herself	Special guest
2014	The Playboy Morning Show	Herself	Special guest
2015	The Damon Elliott Show	Herself	Special guest
2014–2015	Overhaulin'	Herself	Host
2017	MVP	Herself	Host for 1 episode

=== Movies ===
Year	Title	Role	Notes
2012	Here Comes the Boom	Herself	Uncredited
2015	Girl House	Kylie	Uncredited
TBA	Brass Knuckles	Miyoung	Pre-production

=== Video games ===
Year	Title	Role	Notes
2010	UFC Undisputed 2010	Herself	
2011	UFC Personal Trainer	Herself	
2012	UFC Undisputed 3	Herself	
2014	EA Sports UFC	Herself	
2016	EA Sports UFC 2	Herself	
2018	EA Sports UFC 3	Herself	

Preceded by Michelle Madrigal	FHM Cover Girl (May 2012)	Succeeded by Kaye Abad
Preceded by Valeen Montenegro	FHM Cover Girl (August 2015)	Succeeded by Yam Concepcion
Preceded by Nadine Lustre	MH Women (September 2015)	Succeeded by Incumbent
