= EA Sports UFC 4 =

- Cover art featuring Jorge Masvidal and Israel Adesanya
- Developer: EA Vancouver
- Publisher: EA Sports
- Director: Brian Hayes
- Producer: Nate McDonald
- Series: EA Sports UFC
- Engine: Ignite
- Platforms: PlayStation 4; Xbox One
- Release: August 14, 2020
- Genres: Fighting, sports
- Modes: Single-player, multiplayer

EA Sports UFC 4 is a mixed martial arts fighting video game developed by EA Vancouver and published by EA Sports. Serving as the sequel to EA Sports UFC 3 (2018), it was released on August 14, 2020 for PlayStation 4 and Xbox One.

== Gameplay ==
Like its predecessor, UFC 4 is a fighting game based on the mixed martial arts promotion Ultimate Fighting Championship (UFC). There are 229 unique fighters, with 81 alternate versions. The game features a career mode, which was designed to be an "onboarding experience" to teach the player the basics of four MMA disciplines which include boxing, kickboxing, wrestling, and jiujitsu. The goal of the career mode, which allows players to create their own custom fighter, is to become the G.O.A.T. (which stands for "greatest of all time"). As players progress in the game, they can choose to accept or decline fights, which will affect the development of the fighter's career. The control scheme was also improved and streamlined to make the game more accessible. Multiplayer modes, including Blitz Battles, and Online World Championships, would also be available. In addition to fighting in The Octagon, players can also fight in Backyard and Kumite, which resembles an underground fighting arena. However, unlike its predecessor, Ultimate Team would not return in UFC 4.

== Development ==
The game was officially announced on July 12, 2020. Similar to UFC 3, the game utilized the Real Player Motion technology, which was designed to make clinches believable. The tech also helped create new takedown animations which respond to how players play the game. EA also recruited Daniel Cormier and Jon Anik to provide commentary for the game. Joe Rogan, who provided the commentary for previous games, did not return due to his dislike for voiceover in video games. Players who pre-ordered the game would get exclusive access to play as Tyson Fury and Anthony Joshua. On the day of announcement, EA also revealed that Jorge "Gamebred" Masvidal and Israel "The Last Stylebender" Adesanya would be the cover fighters for the game. The game was released for PlayStation 4 and Xbox One on August 14, 2020.

== Reception ==
Reception

Aggregate scores
Aggregator	Score
Metacritic	78/100 (PS4); 82/100 (XONE)
OpenCritic	72% recommend

Review scores
Publication	Score
Game Informer	8.5/10
GamesRadar+	3/5
Hardcore Gamer	3/5
IGN	8/10
Push Square	80%
Shacknews	7/10

According to review aggregator Metacritic, the game received generally positive reviews upon release. Fellow review aggregator OpenCritic assessed that the game received strong approval, being recommended by 72% of critics.

IGN praised the new submission system and career mode, but said that "longstanding problems still remain in the ground game and some dated visuals". Push Square stated that it was "significantly better" than its predecessor, however, Hardcore Gamer said it was "fun albeit bland". GamesRadar praised the clinches but criticised the camera. Brian Shea, writing for Game Informer, described the submission system as one of the game's best additions. He further described the game as the "terrific next step" for EA's UFC franchise.

The game was heavily criticised by fans for the addition of in-game advertisements that were added two weeks after the game's release. A post on Reddit showing advertisements in the game for the second season premiere of the Amazon Prime Video television series The Boys, which included two full-screen pop-ups at the beginning and end of the replay, a smaller pop-up on the timer overlay during gameplay, and the show and service's logos layered in the middle of the Octagon canvas, garnered over 86,000 upvotes as of September 5, 2020. EA later apologised for the inconvenience and removed the pop-up advertising in response to the backlash.

During the 24th Annual D.I.C.E. Awards, the Academy of Interactive Arts & Sciences nominated EA Sports UFC 4 for "Fighting Game of the Year", which was ultimately awarded to Mortal Kombat 11 Ultimate.

The game topped the sales chart in the UK, however first-week physical sales were down 47% on UFC 3. The game was also number 1 in Australia, New Zealand, and the EMEA, but only got to number 28 in Japan. It got to number 2 in the USA, behind Madden, setting a sales record for the franchise. In North America, it was the 16th most downloaded game of 2021 on PSN. It was still in the top 10 of the PS4 download charts in both the US and Europe in April 2023.
