= EA Sports MMA =

2010 video game

- Developer: EA Tiburon
- Publisher: EA Sports
- Platforms: PlayStation 3; Xbox 360; iOS
- Release: Xbox 360, PlayStation 3; NA: October 19, 2010; PAL: October 22, 2010; iOS; WW: October 21, 2010
- Genre: Sports
- Modes: Single-player, multiplayer

EA Sports MMA is a 2010 sports video game which was developed by EA Tiburon and published by EA Sports. It was released for the PlayStation 3 and Xbox 360 on October 19, 2010, in North America and October 22, 2010, everywhere else. Online services have been shut down since April 13, 2012 for the PlayStation 3 and Xbox 360.

== Game details ==
On June 1, 2009, Electronic Arts announced that an all-new fighting title is in development under the EA Sports brand. EA Sports MMA was released in 2010 on the Xbox 360 and PS3. Its website did not reveal any facts about the gameplay or its release date, just one link to sign up for the EA Sports newsletter and another that directs people to EA Sports' MMA forum. However, the Facebook page for the game released steady numbers of videos and amounts of preview information leading up to the release. This game has many options to create the ultimate MMA experience. The game focuses on global MMA, not restricting its gameplay to one brand or region.

It was announced that the first trailer would be shown on CBS, during Strikeforce: Fedor vs. Rogers on November 7, 2009. The trailer featured Emelianenko and Rogers performing a variety of attacks and defenses against each other. The trailer ended with both of the men about to punch each other in the face. It was announced that EA MMA would feature Strikeforce as its flagship promotion.

The US cover for the game shows Fedor Emelianenko and Randy Couture, while the Japanese cover has Hidehiko Yoshida instead of Couture.

== Gameplay ==
Players can move and strike at enemies. They can turn attacks into body punches, kicks or feints. Takedown/transition attempts and takedown/transition defense can be performed. Depending on the timing, the successful defense can result in a sprawl, transitional block or a reversal. Submissions can be attempted, and the defending player can prevent the hold from being applied if he reacts quickly enough. Otherwise, the fighters engage in one of two submission mini-games. Once a submission has been initiated, it is not possible to cancel out of it.

For arm and leg submissions, the players must tap either the submit or defend button several times until the defending fighter either submits or escapes. The idea is to tap the button in short bursts while maintaining the stamina at optimum levels and never letting it drain completely. For chokes, a circular image appears in the center of the screen. A colored marker moves along the circumference from clockwise to counterclockwise in unpredictable patterns and fades in and out of view. The player (whether on offense or defense) must track and match the movement of the marker with the left analog stick. The circle shrinks (while the screen fades to black) as the fighter gets closer to getting choked out and expands when one gets closer to escaping.

The game is set in venues to include boxing rings, circular cages, and hexagonal cages, and it includes multiple rule sets including Strikeforce, Japanese, and Vale Tudo rules in addition to standard Unified Rules. The game includes the ability to fight southpaw- or orthodox, execute foot stomps, soccer kicks and knees to the face on the ground, and fight on the cage, with clinch work and countering. Mauro Ranallo and Frank Shamrock provide commentary, but are unable to announce most custom names. Jimmy Lennon Jr. is the announcer in Strikeforce rules and Lenne Hardt is the announcer Japanese and Vale Tudo rules. The game also featured 'Live Broadcasts' that could be viewed from PC or consoles. The player is able to upload hype videos, which will help to increase popularity. EA Sports would choose the fighters based on their Hype videos and schedule fight cards just like in real life MMA. Real-life prizes were given out, to a certain level.

== Soundtrack ==
The soundtrack features around 30 hip-hop, rock and metal songs from various artists through the EA Trax feature.

== UFC controversy ==
UFC president Dana White declared himself "at war" with EA over the development of the EA Sports MMA video game. According to White, the UFC had hoped that EA Sports would pick up the publishing rights to the UFC's video game license, but EA Sports declined. White remarks, "EA Sports told us, 'You're not a real sport. We wouldn't touch this thing. We want nothing to do with this.'" The UFC instead partnered with THQ to develop UFC 2009 Undisputed. "We put our asses on the line, THQ, and the UFC, to make a video-game deal in the worst economy in the world," White told reporters in July 2009. "We go out there and do this thing, and it's successful, and now EA Sports wants to do a video game.

White warned the fighters who intend to be included in the upcoming EA Sports MMA game release, claiming that "If you do business with EA, you won't be in the UFC". Former UFC heavyweight champions Tim Sylvia and Andrei Arlovski, as well as Frank Trigg and Vladimir Matyushenko confirmed their presence in the EA Sports MMA video game. Fan favorite Randy Couture was under contract with UFC before agreeing to be a part of EA Sports MMA, but was able to take part in the game due to never signing over his likeness to the UFC for use in video games. White has since changed his standpoint on this subject.

== Game launch and reception ==
Reception

Aggregate scores
Aggregator	Score
GameRankings	80.5% Xbox 360, 78.2% PS3
Metacritic	79% Xbox 360, 78% PS3

Review scores
Publication	Score
Edge	6/10
Eurogamer	7/10
Game Informer	8.5/10
GamePro	4.5/5
GameSpot	7.5/10
IGN	8/10
Official Xbox Magazine (US)	9/10
X-Play	3/5

EA Sports MMA launched on October 19, 2010, with a public launch party for fans and media. At the gatherings, UFC Hall of Fame fighter Randy Couture and former Pride champion Fedor Emelianenko, both of whom grace the cover of the game, finally got the opportunity to fight each other, albeit via their video gamer personas. Fedor went on to win via TKO in the game.

Initial reviews have been positive with Metacritic giving the Xbox 360 version a score of 79% after 55 reviews (78% after 42 reviews for the PS3 version) and Game Rankings giving the Xbox360 version a score of 80.5% after 39 reviews (78.2% after 25 reviews for the PS3 Version). While EA Sports MMA remains a critical success thus far, it hasn't had the same success financially. According to a Cowen & Company analyst, sales of EA Sports MMA have been poor, with analyst Doug Creutz saying it's “more or less dead on arrival at retail".

During the 14th Annual Interactive Achievement Awards, the Academy of Interactive Arts & Sciences nominated EA Sports MMA for "Fighting Game of the Year".

== iOS ==
On October 21, 2010 EA Sports MMA was released as for the iOS platform. It is a scaled-down version of the game, featuring 24 fighters from five different weight class, create-a-fighter mode and career mode.

== Sequel ==
On June 4, 2012, Dana White, along with THQ, announced that the UFC game license had been transferred to EA Sports, who produced the next cross-platform UFC game. On June 17, 2014, EA Sports UFC was released as a spiritual successor to both EA Sports MMA and UFC Undisputed 3.

== See also ==
- EA Sports UFC
- Fight Night (video game series)
