= Dan Caldwell =

American entrepreneur and television producer

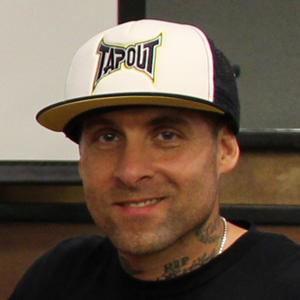
- Occupations: Entrepreneur, producer
- Known for: Tapout

Dan Caldwell is an American entrepreneur. He is a co-founder of Tapout, and is president of the company. He produces and appears in movies, television series, and documentaries.

== Career ==
Gary Fields, along with Charles Lewis, founded TapouT, a clothing company aimed toward athletes and mixed martial arts (MMA) enthusiasts, in Grand Terrace, California in 1997, and became CEO of the company. TapouT started out of the back of a car selling t-shirts at the underground MMA competitions and classes. In 2011, TapouT was sold to Authentic Brands Group with Caldwell as president of the company.

In 2014, Caldwell opened a frozen yogurt shop. He owns a real estate office, Nutrishop store, a tattoo parlor, Givestars.com, and MentorMojo.com. Caldwell hosts the TapouT Radio show on SiriusXM. He has spoken at business conferences including Jolt in Idaho, Follow the Leader in North Carolina, Entrepreneurs Organization in Reno, and Startup Grind in Santa Cruz.

== Filmography ==
Caldwell was in the TapouT TV series in 2007. He was in the TV Series MMA H.E.A.T. in 2009 and 2010. Also in 2010, he appeared in the TV series World Extreme Cagefighting, and was executive producer of The Hammer and Locked Down, as well as produced the documentary The Striking Truth 3D. He was executive producer of documentary Once I Was a Champion in 2011, produced 1 Out of 7, and appeared in Warrior in 2011. In 2012, he was executive producer for documentaries Clockwork Orange County and History of MMA, which he also appeared in. He produced and appeared in Mask, a documentary, in 2013 and was executive producer of documentary The Actor that same year. Caldwell was executive producer of Pretty Perfect in 2014. In 2015 he appeared on Season 3 of Below Deck.

== Philanthropy ==
Street Smart Jobz worked with Caldwell and Tim Katz in January 2010 to provide career advice for young adults who have recently left the foster-care system. In 2012, he participated in a fundraising event for the Livestrong Foundation and the SickKids Foundation.
