= EA Sports UFC =

2014 video game

- Cover art featuring Jon Jones and Alexander Gustafsson
- Developers: EA Canada; SkyBox Labs
- Publisher: EA Sports
- Engine: Ignite (PS4, XB1)
- Platforms: PlayStation 4 Xbox One iOS; Android
- Release: PlayStation 4, Xbox One; June 17, 2014; iOS, Android; April 21, 2015
- Genres: Fighting, sports
- Modes: Single-player, multiplayer

EA Sports UFC is a mixed martial arts fighting video game developed in a collaboration between EA Canada and SkyBox Labs, and published by EA Sports for PlayStation 4 and Xbox One. It is based on the Ultimate Fighting Championship (UFC) brand and was released on June 17, 2014. It is the first UFC game since THQ sold the license to Electronic Arts. A downgraded port of the game was released for mobile devices in April 2015. The game was followed by a sequel that released in March 2016.

== Gameplay ==
EA Sports UFC is a mixed martial arts fighting game based on the Ultimate Fighting Championship (UFC). Its artificial intelligence accommodates for changes in player strategies mid-game to make the gaming experience more realistic than in previous UFC games. The game also simulates "full body deformation" to connect players with their player-character. The Ultimate Fighter is featured at the start of Career Mode. Also included are perks unlocked throughout career to boost game-plans.

== Development and release ==
Conflict originally arose between UFC president Dana White and Electronic Arts, when the UFC approached EA Sports to develop a UFC video game and EA refused. The UFC then turned to publisher THQ to develop UFC titles with Yuke's. THQ's UFC 2009 Undisputed shipped approximately 2 million copies. With the success of the series, THQ quickly began working on a sequel, UFC Undisputed 2010, and followed this release with UFC Undisputed 3 in 2012.

With the growing popularity of MMA (the UFC banner particularly) and THQ's success, Electronic Arts began working on EA Sports MMA, featuring UFC's then promotional rival, Strikeforce. After the closing of THQ, Electronic Arts announced a "multi-year, multi-product" partnership with the Ultimate Fighting Championship at the Electronic Entertainment Expo 2012. THQ reported that the publishing rights were purchased by EA Sports for an "undisclosed cash payment". The first gameplay for the game was shown at the Xbox One reveal event in a trailer by EA Sports. The game is one of the first to run Electronic Arts's Ignite engine.

As a result of the new project, Electronic Arts put its Fight Night boxing franchise on hold. The company said that the decision was based primarily on its perception that the UFC has greater international prominence, although EA Sports did offer that the boxing series could potentially return. The Fight Night team (EA Canada) became the UFC team.

A playable demo was released on the PlayStation Network and Xbox Marketplace on June 3, 2014, with cover athletes Jon "Bones" Jones and Alexander "The Mauler" Gustafsson as playable fighters, with the full game releasing two weeks later on June 17. A free-to-play mobile version of the game was released for iOS and Android devices on April 21, 2015.

== Roster ==
The roster was gradually revealed by EA Sports in batches. The final roster consists of 97 UFC fighters (not including DLC additions). UFC legend Royce Gracie and late martial arts icon Bruce Lee are both featured in the game as bonus unlockable fighters. Gracie is playable in the middleweight division, and Lee is playable in bantamweight, featherweight, lightweight and welterweight. A free content update was released for download on July 22, 2014, adding T.J. Dillashaw, Tyron Woodley and Takeya Mizugaki to the roster. On August 26, 2014, EA released another patch that included heavyweight Stipe Miocic as well as welterweights Matt Brown and Mike Pyle. On October 2, EA released their third patch including Tim Kennedy and Gunnar Nelson, and also making Nick Diaz able to switch to the middleweight division. On October 29, EA released their fourth patch including Hector Lombard, Diego Sanchez and Michael Chiesa, and also making Gegard Mousasi able to switch to the middleweight division. On November 19, EA released a fifth patch, this one including Myles Jury, Andrei Arlovski, and Yoel Romero. On December 10, EA released a legends pack, which included Mark Coleman, Matt Hughes, Quinton Jackson and Brock Lesnar. On January 21, EA released a seventh patch, this one including Eddie Alvarez, Holly Holm, Rafael dos Anjos and Anthony Johnson. This was said to be the last major update as they began focusing on the sequel, which was released in spring 2016.

== Legacy ==
A sequel, EA Sports UFC 2, was released in March 2016. The third installment, EA Sports UFC 3, was released on February 2, 2018, and a fourth title, EA Sports UFC 4, was released on August 14, 2020. EA Sports UFC 5, was released in October 2023 for the ninth generation of video game consoles, and the most recent installment EA Sports UFC 6, was released on June 18, 2026.

== Reception ==
Reception

Aggregate score
Aggregator	Score	
Aggregator	PS4	Xbox One
Metacritic	70/100	70/100

Review scores
Publication	Score	
Publication	PS4	Xbox One
Destructoid	7/10	N/A
Electronic Gaming Monthly	N/A	9/10
Game Informer	N/A	8/10
GameRevolution	4/5	N/A
GameSpot	5/10	N/A
GamesRadar+	3.5/5	N/A
IGN	6.8/10	N/A
Polygon	5/10	N/A
VideoGamer.com	6/10	N/A

EA Sports UFC received "mixed or average" reviews, according to video game review aggregator Metacritic.
