= Angela Hayes =

Angela Hayes may refer to:

- Angela Hayes (mixed martial artist) on Tapout
- Angela Hayes, character in the 1999 film American Beauty, portrayed by Mena Suvari

== See also ==
- Angela Haynes (born 1984), American former tennis player
