= Megan Olivi =

Mixed martial arts reporter (born 1986)

- Born: August 29, 1986 (age 40); New Jersey, U.S.
- Education: Seton Hall University; Fordham University
- Occupations: Sports television personality Sideline reporter
- Notable credit: UFC Ultimate Insider
- Spouse: Joseph Benavidez (m. 2015)

Megan Olivi is an American sports news/events reporter who hosts UFC Ultimate Insider on Fox Sports 1 and is a sideline reporter on NFL on Fox.

== Early life ==
Megan Olivi is the youngest of three children and was born in New Jersey. She spent the majority of her youth growing up in Nazareth, Pennsylvania. She is of Italian descent.

Olivi played softball in school and wanted to pursue a career in gymnastics but was not able to due to her family's financial situation.

== College years ==
Olivi attended Seton Hall University where she earned a degree in political science as her undergraduate major. While attending Seton Hall, she interned with Fox News. Olivi then earned a master's degree in broadcast journalism at Fordham University.

== Journalism career ==
Shortly after completing her master's degree, Olivi was offered an opportunity to cover the sport of Mixed Martial Arts in Las Vegas, Nevada and decided to move cross-country and take a chance on this career opportunity. After taking this new job, Olivi fell in love with the sport of Mixed Martial Arts while also continuing to polish her on-camera skills, most notably co-hosting the live Ultimate Fighting Championship (UFC) Preshow Fight Day. Olivi then went on to work for Fox Sports covering UFC events and hosting lifestyle segments for FoxSports.com.

In February 2013, Olivi accepted a role as a correspondent for Fox 6 News San Diego covering the San Diego Padres as a Social Media Reporter while also hosting and producing a weekly magazine show called “Padres POV”. Olivi soon moved on from her career with the Padres and returned to Las Vegas to pursue a reporting opportunity with the UFC where she currently travels the world covering UFC events.

Olivi hosts UFC Ultimate Insider on Fox Sports 1. She has a series on UFC Fight Pass, The Exchange With Megan Olivi.

Olivi has worked as a sideline reporter for the NFL coverage on Fox since the 2021 season. She has teamed with color analyst announcers Aqib Talib, LaVar Arrington, and Jonathan Vilma, as well as play-by-play announcers Gus Johnson, Joe Davis, Brandon Gaudin, Jason Benetti, and Kenny Albert.

== 2017 Miss Universe pageant ==
Olivi was both a preliminary and final telecast judge at the 2017 Miss Universe pageant.

== Personal life ==
Olivi is married to former UFC flyweight title challenger Joseph Benavidez.
