= EA Sports UFC 6 =

- Cover featuring Alex Pereira
- Developer: EA Vancouver
- Publisher: EA Sports
- Series: EA Sports UFC
- Engine: Frostbite
- Platforms: PlayStation 5; Xbox Series X/S
- Release: June 19, 2026
- Genres: Fighting, sports
- Modes: Single-player, multiplayer

EA Sports UFC 6 is a mixed martial arts fighting video game developed by EA Vancouver and published by EA Sports. It is the sixth installment in the EA Sports UFC franchise, and it was released on June 19, 2026 for PlayStation 5 and Xbox Series X and Series S.

== Gameplay ==
UFC 6 is a third-person fighting game. Gameplay is largely identical to its predecessor, though the game introduces a new system named "Flow State" which rewards players for mimicking a fighter's real-world style. Each fighter has their own strengths, and playing to their strengths rewards players with "Flow Boosts". When the player's flow meter is filled, they may gain a perk, allowing them to fight more efficiently and opening up opportunities for finishing moves. Blocking stances are significantly expanded, with four distinct categories being introduced. The game also adds a new game physics system, and a time dilation mechanic enabling players to slow down time briefly.

In addition to the standard career mode, the game adds a prologue known as "The Legacy", which follows two MMA upstarts who become rivals as they advance through the ranks. UFC 6 also adds a mode named "Hall of Legends", which are interactive museums based on the life of Alex Pereira, Max Holloway, and Zhang Weili.

== Development ==
Announced in May 2026, the game is set to be released for PlayStation 5 and Xbox Series X and Series S on June 19, 2026. EA Sports marketed the game as the "most realistic and authentic fighting experience", with a focus on enhancing the individuality of each fighter. Players who purchased the Ultimate Edition can access the game seven days earlier.

== Reception ==
Reception

Aggregate scores
Aggregator	Score
Metacritic	(PS5) 83/100
OpenCritic	91% recommend

According to review aggregator Metacritic, the game received "generally favorable" reviews. Fellow review aggregator OpenCritic assessed that the game received strong approval, being recommended by 91% of critics.
