= EA Sports UFC 3 =

2018 mixed martial arts video game

- Cover art featuring "The Notorious" Conor McGregor
- Developer: EA Canada
- Publisher: EA Sports
- Engine: Ignite
- Platforms: PlayStation 4 Xbox One
- Release: February 2, 2018
- Genres: Fighting, sports
- Modes: Single-player, multiplayer

EA Sports UFC 3 is a mixed martial arts fighting video game developed by EA Canada and published by EA Sports. "The Notorious" Conor McGregor, one of the previous cover fighters of EA Sports UFC 2, returned as the official cover fighter of the game. Serving as the sequel to 2014's EA Sports UFC and 2016's EA Sports UFC 2, it was released on February 2, 2018, for PlayStation 4 and Xbox One. A sequel, EA Sports UFC 4, was released on August 14, 2020.

On February 17, 2025, the game was delisted from digital storefronts and the online servers were shut down.

== Gameplay ==
EA Sports UFC 3 is a mixed martial arts fighting game, similar to previous installments, the game is based on Ultimate Fighting Championship (UFC), while also retaining realism with respect to physics, sounds and movements. The game has also been heavily endorsed by Conor McGregor, the cover athlete as well as one of the UFC's top stars. New to the series is the "G.O.A.T. (Greatest of All Time)" career mode, where the choices made throughout the career impact the player's path to greatness. Outside of fights, the player can make promotional choices to build hype, gain fans, earn more cash through big contracts and capture the world's attention. A new in-game social media system now allows the player to create heated rivalries with other UFC athletes, providing the freedom to take on any type of persona.

Continuing on the Knockout Mode which was introduced in EA Sports UFC 2, the game delivers a new type of multiplayer modes designed for fast and quick fights that are integral when playing against opponents. The tournament mode offers ultimate rights as the player attempts to take on as many opponents as possible in bracket-style elimination rounds with continuous damage and fatigue. With 234 different fighters (including Bruce Lee) in 10 weight classes, the game contains the biggest character roster out of the three EA Sports UFC games. Furthermore, Snoop Dogg provides commentary on Knockout Mode, but can allow the option to have Joe Rogan alongside Dogg, or have Jon Anik alongside Rogan for the traditional broadcast commentary in Knockout Mode.

== Development ==
EA Sports announced on November 1, 2017, that a third installment was in development. Along with the initial announcement, a short teaser trailer featuring UFC fighters Demetrious "Mighty Mouse" Johnson, Anderson "The Spider" Silva, and Joanna Jędrzejczyk was also conducted. On November 3, the official reveal trailer of EA Sports UFC 3 was released worldwide. Like other EA games, UFC 3 has been criticized for implementing pay-to-win mechanics. Although the use of microtransactions is expected to only affect one game mode, the option for consumers to spend real money to avoid grinding has been derided as exploitative. The game was released on February 2, 2018.

UFC 3 is also the first title to support RPM Tech, an engine developed by EA Sports which more accurately represents character movements.

== Reception ==
=== Critical response ===
Reception

Aggregate score
Aggregator	Score
Metacritic	75/100

Review scores
Publication	Score
Electronic Gaming Monthly	5/10
Game Informer	8.75/10
GamesMaster	62%
GameSpot	8/10
GamesRadar+	3.5/5
IGN	7.5/10
PlayStation Official Magazine – UK	6/10
Polygon	7.5/10

EA Sports UFC 3 received "generally favorable" reviews from critics, according to review aggregator Metacritic.

Game Informer praised the graphics, saying the "attention to detail is gorgeous, from the way fighters circle each other in the Octagon to the facial animations as an overhand right comes down on their cheek". Polygon said "the honeymoon with UFC 3 is short. Career Mode, comprises several stages of a fighter's rise through his or her weight class. Yet by the 10th fight, the repetition and grind became obvious."

EGMNow criticized the microtransactions, saying "Just like in other EA Ultimate Team modes, this is a clear cash grab, attempting to get you hooked to the mode in the hopes you'll spend real-world money on card packs to more quickly advance your fighter's stats – it's nothing short of infuriating." GamesRadar+ said that it "makes Battlefront 2's lootbox system look immensely charitable." IGN also called the mode "straight-up terrible".

GameSpot summarized it as "EA Sports UFC 3 is a tense, exciting, and dynamic recreation of the stand and bang aspect of mixed martial arts. The grappling still needs plenty of work, and one would hope this is something EA Canada addresses in the next iteration; yet these shortcomings become easier to overlook because of the accomplishment of its redefined striking. When it comes to the art of combat, few sports titles do it better."

=== Sales ===
UFC 3 reached number 12 in the UK sales charts, behind Monster Hunter: World. It was ranked number 22 in Australia, behind Shadow of the Colossus, and number 11 in New Zealand. It reached number 32 in Japan.

It was the 16th most downloaded PS4 title in the US, and 7th in Europe in February 2018.

=== Awards ===
The game was nominated for "Game, Franchise Fighting" and "Performance in a Sports Game" with Jon Anik at the National Academy of Video Game Trade Reviewers Awards.
