= UFC Undisputed 2010 =

2010 video game

- Cover art featuring Brock Lesnar
- Developer: Yuke's
- Publisher: THQ
- Platforms: PlayStation 3, Xbox 360, PlayStation Portable, iOS
- Release: PlayStation 3 & Xbox 360: NA: 25 May 2010; AU: 27 May 2010; EU: 28 May 2010; JP: 9 September 2010; PlayStation Portable: NA: 7 September 2010; AU: 9 September 2010; EU: 9 October 2010; iOS; 12 November 2010
- Genre: Sports (fighting)
- Modes: Single-player, multiplayer

UFC Undisputed 2010 (also known as UFC Undisputed 2) is a mixed martial arts fighting game featuring Ultimate Fighting Championship (UFC) properties and fighters developed by Yuke's and published by THQ in 2010 for the PlayStation 3, Xbox 360, and (for the first time) PlayStation Portable. It is the second game to be released under THQ's 2007 agreement with the UFC and it is a sequel to the successful UFC 2009 Undisputed. Another sequel, UFC Undisputed 3, was released in 2012.

== Gameplay ==
UFC Undisputed 2010 includes multiple changes from the previous version:

- Improved controls, including a redesign of clinch and ground grappling, as well as an improved career mode, starting in the World Fighting Alliance.
- Changes to gameplay including usage of cage walls, TKO (cut and injury) finishes and the introduction of karate, Greco-Roman wrestling, and Judo fighting styles.
- Added MMA brands for clothing as well as the introduction of post-fight attire.
- New arenas including GM Place, Centre Bell and The O_{2}.

Each fighter on the Undisputed 2010 roster have skills and attributes that can be only viewed while selecting a fighter in exhibition mode. Some fighters have different moves than others which can be seen by pausing the game and selecting the controls while using a fighter, again there is no other method to view a fighters moves. Shaquille O'Neal, as well as the Tapout crew from UFC 2009 Undisputed are unlockable fighters.

=== Career Mode ===
In career mode, players can create their own fighter and make their way to the top of the UFC. The player starts in amateur fights and heads to the World Fighting Alliance, where after a successful run he is invited to fight in the UFC by Dana White. After victories in the smaller Fight Night shows, the player is given the option to fight in the pay-per-view cards. Consecutive victories lead to a title shot, and after winning the title and defending it for a while the player will be given the option to change divisions and fight for the title in another weight class. After 54 fights the player will retire and become a trainer, and if he had a successful career will be inducted in the UFC Hall-of-Fame.

There are many interactive options during Career Mode. Training for a fight involves a management system where the player pick an exercise where he can play sparring minigames, or automatically raise their stats. Along with technique stats are levels of strength, speed and stamina. Focusing too much on raising stats of a particular area will make the other stats decay, so the player must alternate between activities. After joining the UFC and raising his popularity, the player will receive many optional activities, such as participating in press-workouts with Rachelle Leah or photoshoots with Arianny Celeste. The player can attend weigh-ins during title fights and will be interviewed by Joe Rogan after every PPV fight.

=== Ultimate Fights Mode ===
The Classic Fights Mode from UFC 2009 Undisputed returns as Ultimate Fights Mode. Players can revisit some of the greatest fights in UFC history and unlock videos. Playing as the winner of a fight unlocks a highlight of the fight itself, while playing as the loser unlocks post-fight interviews.

== Development and release ==
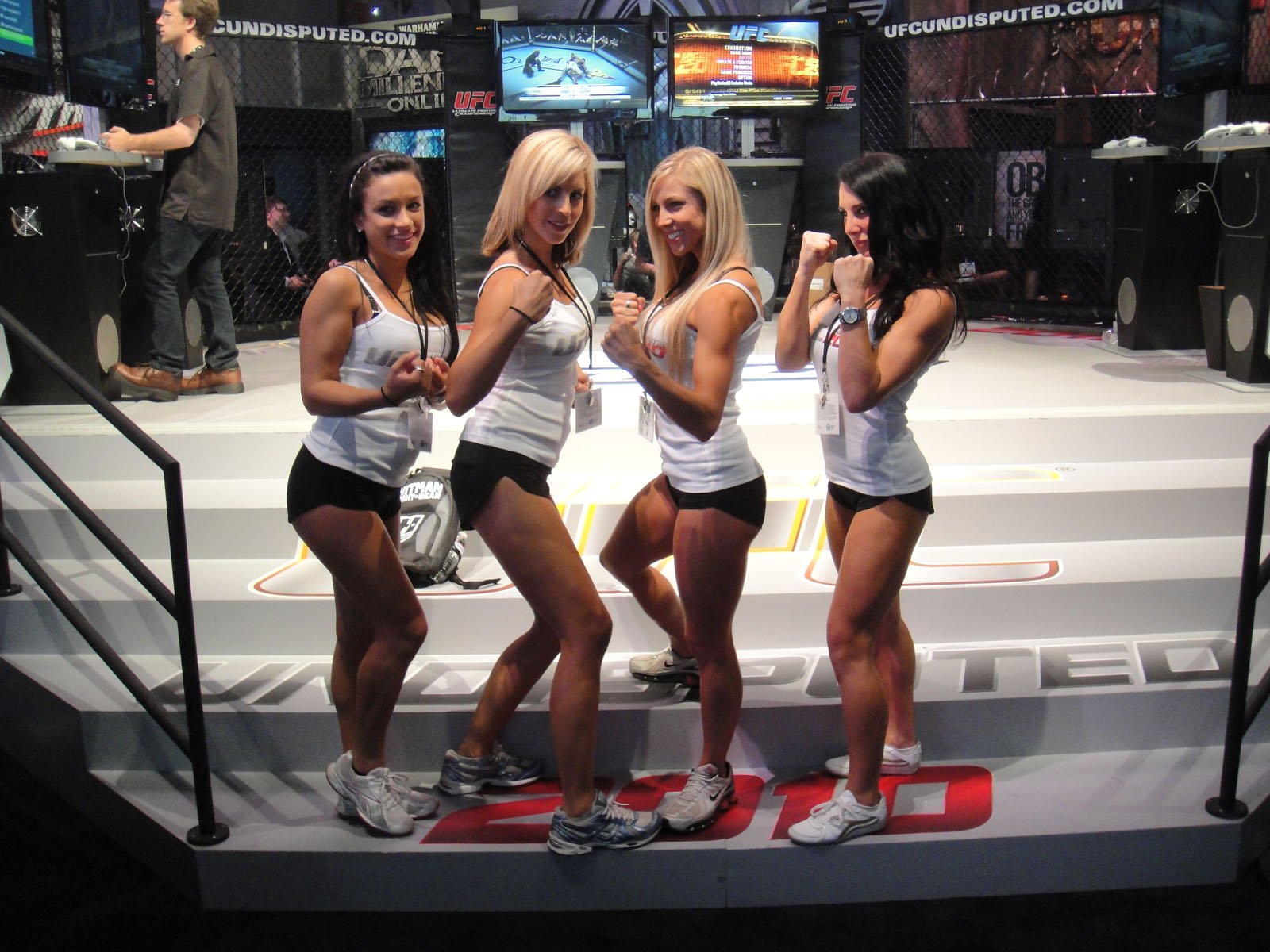
Promotion at E3 2010

A teaser trailer of the game was shown on 12 December 2009 at the 2009 Spike Video Game Awards, where UFC 2009 Undisputed was named the Best Individual Sports Game, showing a first look at The Ultimate Fighter: Heavyweights contestant Kimbo Slice. The full roster was announced in April 2010.

UFC president Dana White declared himself "at war" with Electronic Arts over the development of EA Sports MMA. According to White, the UFC had hoped that EA Sports would pick up the publishing rights to the UFC's video game license, but EA Sports declined. White remarked: "EA Sports told us, 'You're not a real sport. We wouldn't touch this thing. We want nothing to do with this.'" The UFC instead partnered with THQ to develop UFC 2009 Undisputed. "We put our asses on the line, THQ and the UFC, to make a video-game deal in the worst economy in the world," White told reporters in July 2009. "We go out there and do this thing, and it's successful, and now God-damn EA Sports wants to do a video game. White warned the fighters who intended to be included in EA Sports MMA, claiming that "If you do business with EA, you won't be in the UFC." Former UFC Heavyweight Champions Tim Sylvia and Andrei Arlovski, as well as Fabrício Werdum, Dan Henderson and Frank Trigg confirmed their presence in EA Sports MMA. Randy Couture was under contract with UFC before agreeing to be a part of EA Sports MMA, but is able to take part in the game due to never signing over his likeness to the UFC for use in video games; White has since changed his standpoint on this subject.

The demo version of the game features four light heavyweight fighters (Lyoto Machida, Shogun Rua, Rashad Evans and Rampage Jackson). Limited download codes were released on 29 April to members of the UFC Community and the demo was released publicly one week later on both PlayStation Network and Xbox Live.

James McSweeney, Marcus Jones, Brendan Schaub and Roy Nelson were the four bonus fighters as part of the GameStop/Game pre-order bonus. On 16 September 2010, the pre-order bonus fighters were released as downloadable content on the Xbox Marketplace and PlayStation Store.

== Reception ==
Reception

Aggregate scores
Aggregator	Score			
Aggregator	iOS	PS3	PSP	Xbox 360
GameRankings	65%	87%	74%	86%
Metacritic	N/A	85/100	74/100	84/100

Review scores
Publication	Score			
Publication	iOS	PS3	PSP	Xbox 360
Edge	N/A	9/10	N/A	N/A
Eurogamer	N/A	N/A	N/A	8/10
Famitsu	N/A	32/40	N/A	32/40
Game Informer	N/A	8.25/10	N/A	8.25/10
GamePro	N/A	N/A	4/5	5/5
GameRevolution	N/A	B+	N/A	B+
GameSpot	N/A	8/10	N/A	8/10
GameTrailers	N/A	N/A	N/A	9/10
GameZone	N/A	9/10	6.5/10	9/10
Giant Bomb	N/A	N/A	N/A	4/5
IGN	N/A	7.8/10	7.5/10	7.8/10
Official Xbox Magazine (US)	N/A	N/A	N/A	8.5/10
PlayStation: The Official Magazine	N/A	4/5	N/A	N/A
The Daily Telegraph	N/A	N/A	N/A	8/10
Teletext GameCentral	N/A	N/A	N/A	8/10

The PlayStation 3 and Xbox 360 versions received "favourable" reviews, while the PSP version received "average" reviews, according to the review aggregation website Metacritic. Numerous video game websites awarded the game with high praise for its various improvements over the 2009 version. The game's sales, however, were disappointing.

Dakota Grabowski of GameZone said of the PS3 and Xbox 360 versions, "All in all, UFC Undisputed 2010 is a force to be reckoned with. THQ has put every other fighting game on notice as UFC Undisputed 2010 has moved into the domain of one of the best games in the genre." Additionally, GamePro's Caleb Newby called the Xbox 360 version "an intensely satisfying experience." GameTrailers said the same console version was one of the most technically accomplished and brutally satisfying video game entries to date. However, IGN's Greg Miller stated that while the game is good, its little issues hold it back from being impressive. GameSpot's Justin Calvert said that the game's strong point is the core game-play, while the menu-heavy career mode can prove to be a bit tedious, although Calvert later stated that even though the career mode is flawed, it is still capable of keeping you engaged in your character's career. Good Game's two reviewers gave it 8/10 and 8.5/10. In Japan, Famitsu gave the PS3 and Xbox 360 versions a score of all four eights for a total of 32 out of 40.

411Mania gave both console versions nine out of ten and said that the game "feels like an entirely different game than 2009, from the presentation to the fighting stances to everything else [...] This is a definite buy for any MMA fan or even those just wanting to get into the sport." The Daily Telegraph gave the Xbox 360 version eight out of ten and said it was "undeniably the finest UFC experience on any console to date. Graphical glitches aside, UFC [Undisputed] 2010 captures the brutality and epic nature of the sport like nothing else, providing the perfect game to display its deep and satisfying fighting system." Teletext GameCentral gave the same console version a similar score of eight out of ten and stated, "The improvements are incremental at best but this still seems like a near perfect MMA game."

During the 14th Annual Interactive Achievement Awards, the Academy of Interactive Arts & Sciences nominated UFC Undisputed 2010 for "Fighting Game of the Year".
