= Ring girl =

Female model at combat sport events

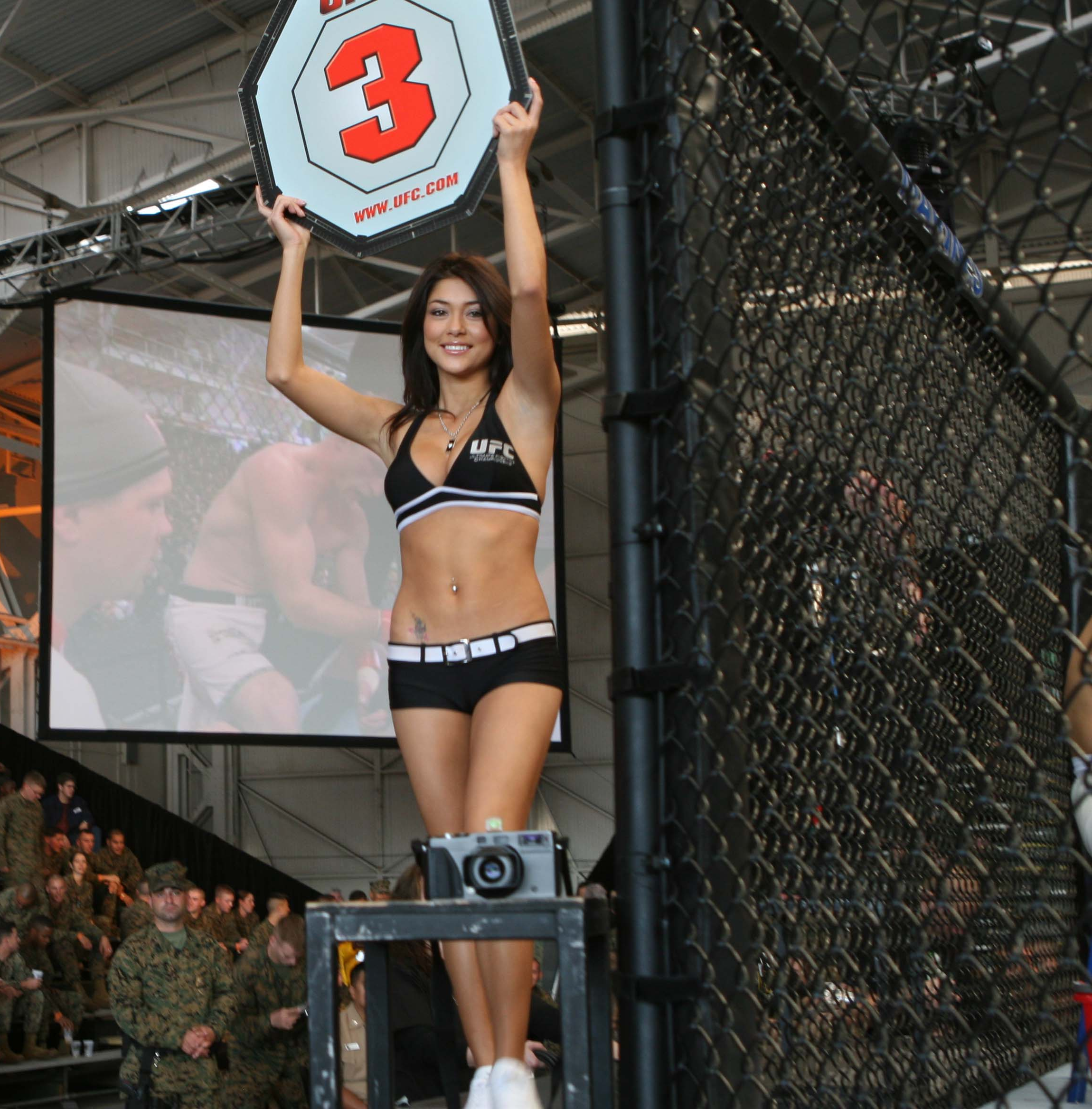
UFC ring girl Arianny Celeste indicates that the third round is about to begin.

A ring girl (also number girl, card girl, or round girl) is an attractive young woman hired to enter the ring between rounds of a combat sport, carrying a sign displaying the number of the next round. Ring girls are often seen in boxing, kickboxing and mixed martial arts.

== History ==
Ring girls first appeared in a 1965 edition of Ring Magazine. The magazine published a photo of a Las Vegas model holding a sign at a boxing match. Boxing promotions soon adopted the concept of ring girls, when promoters started to hire attractive women to parade around the ring holding signs, signaling the upcoming round.

== In modern combat sports ==
=== Professional wrestling ===
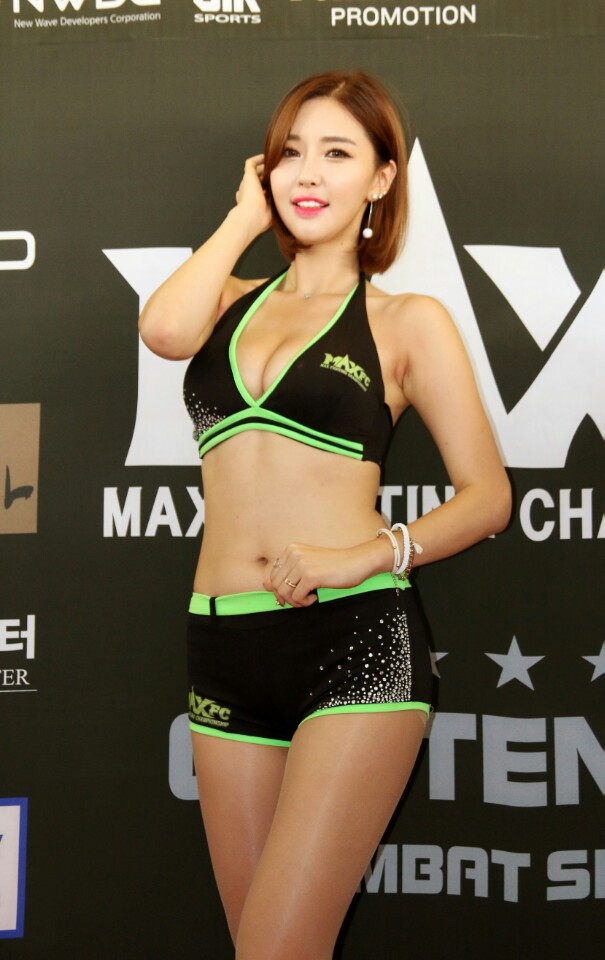
A Max Fighting Championship ring girl at a promotional event

In professional wrestling, ring girls are attendants who remove the entrance gear (such as jackets, robes, and other clothing) and championship belts from the ring after a wrestler takes them off before his match. Throughout the 1980s, World Wrestling Entertainment employed ring girls known as the Federettes. Since its inception in 2002, Total Nonstop Action Wrestling has featured various independent female wrestlers and valets as ring girls.

During the first year of WWF Monday Night Raw, WWE featured traditional boxing-style ring girls who carried signs featuring various Raw-themed slogans in the ring between matches.

=== MMA ===
A list follows of notable ring girls who have posed for the American entertainment magazine, Playboy.

Model:	Date:	Issue:	Notes:
Rachelle Leah	October 2008	Playboy	UFC ring girl
Arianny Celeste	November 2010	Playboy	UFC ring girl
Brittney Palmer	March 2012	Playboy	UFC ring girl
Victoria Elise	June 2021	Playboy Mexico	MMA ring girl

== Controversies ==
=== Allegations of sexism ===
Some sports journalists claim that the use of ring girls, which first started in boxing, is unnecessary. Critics argue that half-naked women at the games provides sexual stimulation for the male audience, whereas others regard them as harmless tradition; boxing promoter Lisa Elovich describes the practice as "part of the show."

"Ring boys" or "ring guys" have been proposed for women's matches. Professional boxer Mikaela Laurén said, "I want a number boy. I think that's only fair, and I'm sure it will give the women in the audience some pleasure as well."

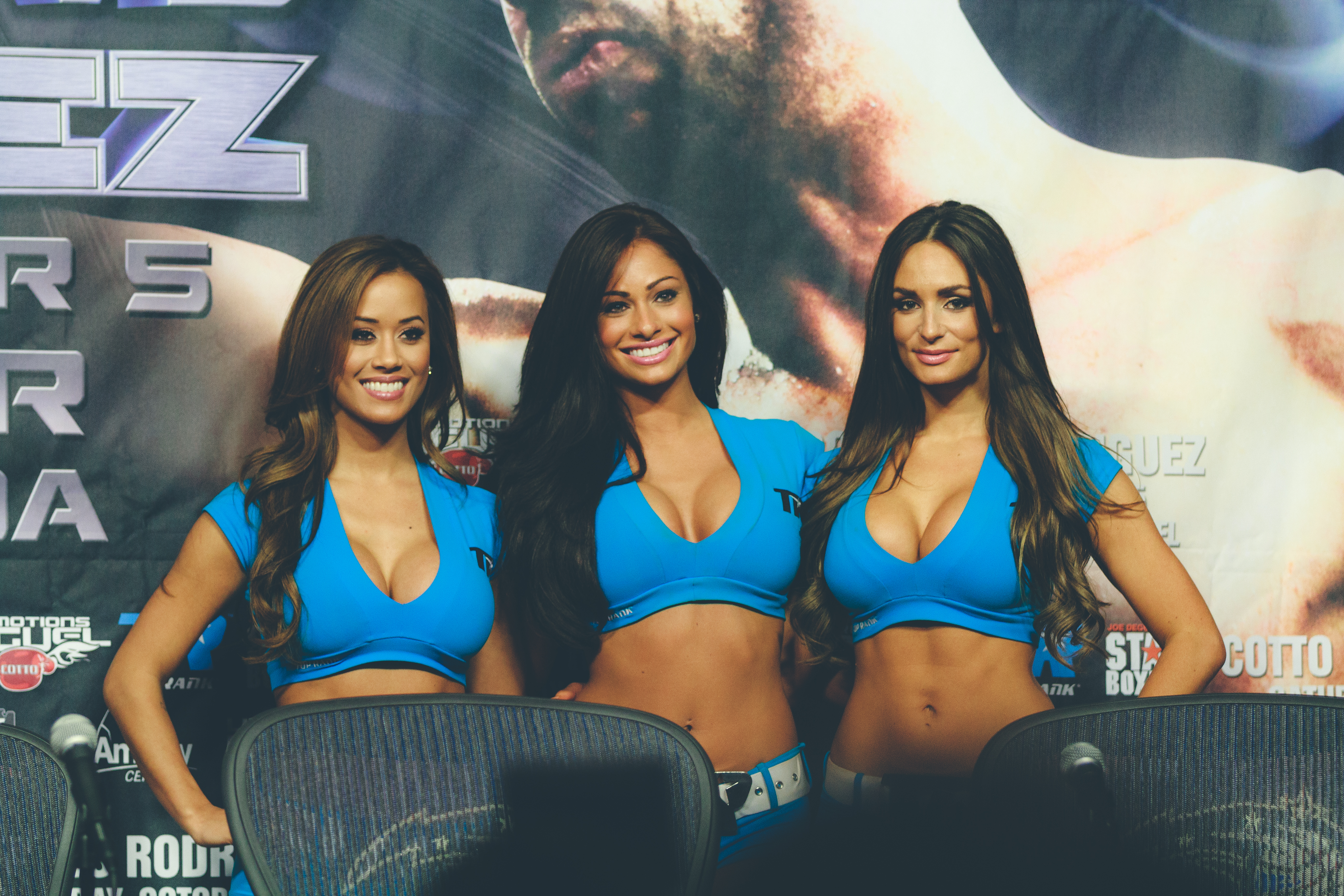
Ring girls at a Top Rank event posing for photographers

While all-female fighting promoter Invicta FC uses ring girls, the promoter brought in UFC fighter and model Elias Theodorou to serve as a ring boy at Invicta FC 28. Theodorou received criticism, however, for using the occasion to promote sponsors.

=== Payments ===
There has been speculation that ring girls are paid more than female fighters. In 2015, former UFC bantamweight champion Ronda Rousey protested. "Do you think her walking in circles," argued Rousey, "is worth more (than fighters)? ... either the ring card girls are paid too much, or the fighters aren't paid enough." UFC ring girls are reputedly paid $18,000 a year. This excludes jobs outside the UFC, like modeling. UFC ring girl Arianny Celeste protested, calling Rousey a "big bully". "I think people don't realise how much work it is to be a model," argued Celeste, "Trying being like a live mannequin and having clients put you in a million different outfits... It's not as easy as it looks... Not a lot of people would know that unless they were in my shoes."

== See also ==
- Cue card girl
- Pin up girls
- Podium girl
- Promotional model
