= Tapout (TV series) =

American reality television series (2007–2008)

- Tapout title card
- Opening theme: "Why Ask Why" by the Underground Rebels
- Country of origin: United States
- No. of seasons: 2
- No. of episodes: 20

Production
- Running time: 60 minutes (including commercials)
- Production company: Pilgrim Films & Television

Original release
- Network: Versus
- Release: June 3, 2007 – October 1, 2008

Tapout is an American reality television series that focuses on the world of mixed martial arts. The series premiered on Versus on June 3, 2007, before moving to its regular Wednesday night timeslot beginning June 6. The series follows Charles Lewis, Jr. - "Mask", Dan Caldwell - "Punkass", and Tim Katz "SkySkrape" of the Tapout clothing and gear line, as they travel around the country in search of promising MMA fighters to develop and possibly sponsor. Each episode follows the training and development of one fighter, culminating in a fight at a professional MMA event.

As the series progressed the focus broadened to encompass not just the scouting of new talent but also the efforts of the Tapout crew to build their business, including day-to-day operations and the inter-relationships between the crew members and other Tapout employees.

On March 11, 2009, Charles "Mask" Lewis was killed in an automobile accident in Newport Beach, California. A female companion was ejected from the car and taken for medical treatment but Lewis was pronounced dead at the scene. The driver of a second car, believed to have been traveling alongside Lewis's car, was arrested on charges of gross vehicular manslaughter while intoxicated.

== Season 1 ==
Episode number	Title	Original airdate	Fighter	Summary
1	Diamond in the Rough	June 3, 2007	Damacio Page	The Tapout crew pick up Damacio Page from his home gym in Albuquerque, New Mexico, where he trains with Greg Jackson. They drive with him to Iowa, where they meet his opponent, Rod Montoya, who trains with Pat Miletich. Page and Montoya face off at Extreme Challenge. Damacio dominates the fight, knocking out Montoya in the first round.
2	Little Fireball	June 6, 2007	Antonio Banuelos	Banuelos, roommate and training partner of Chuck Liddell, is training for WEC 26. He's facing Charlie Valencia to determine the number-one contender for the WEC Bantamweight title. Valencia catches Banuelos with an uppercut three minutes into the first round, knocking him out.
3	Hot Head	June 13, 2007	Matt Major	The crew meets Major at his home gym, American Kickboxing Academy in San Jose, California, where he's living in an office above the gym. They drive with him to Decatur, Illinois for Courage Fighting Championship 8 for his professional MMA debut. After Major works to cut weight, his opponent Adrian Hopson weighs in 11 pounds over and shows up to the fight 13 pounds over. After struggling in round 1, Major comes back in the final two rounds and wins a unanimous decision.
4	The Search Continues	August 1, 2007	Donald Cerrone	Tapout scouts several talented fighters on a cross-country trip. They decide on Donald "Cowboy" Cerrone, who has an undefeated record. They stop in at Matt Hughes' farm before heading out to the Ring of Fire, a mixed martial arts event in Colorado. Cowboy wins his match in the first round by submission with a triangle choke.
5	Charuto	August 8, 2007	Renato Verissimo	The Tapout crew travels to Hawaii to sign up B. J. Penn's Brazilian Jiu-jitsu trainer, Renato "Charuto" Verissimo. After a tour of the island, the boys return to California to attend to some business, then travel back to Hawaii to support Charuto in his ICON Sport-Epic fight against Lars Havens. After an initial flurry by Havens, Charuto takes him to the mat and ends the fight with his ground and pound.
6	Sergio	August 15, 2007	Sergio Gomez	Mask, Punkass and SkySkrape travel to Kenosha, Wisconsin, to scout Sergio before his fight with Marcus Hicks at WEC 27 in Las Vegas. In the week leading up to the fight, the crew works to coordinate Las Vegas publicity activities. On fight night, Sergio closes Hicks' right eye with strikes in round one and has Hicks on his back for much of round two before getting caught in a sudden guillotine choke and being forced to tap out.
7	Sunshine	August 22, 2007	Matt Fiordirosa	The crew meets fighter and coach Jeff Curran in Crystal Lake, Illinois, who introduces them to Matt "Sunshine" Fiordirosa. After watching Matt train and coach some young kids in wrestling, the crew overcomes RV trouble and rain delays to get to New Jersey for his bout with Khristian Geraci. Geraci catches Matt with a big shot to the face in round one but Matt rallies in round two to take Geraci to the ground and force a referee stoppage.
8	Rob Roy	August 29, 2007	Sherron Leggett	The Tapout crew return to Kenosha and meet Sherron "Rob Roy" Leggett, who's angling to become "Tapout's first superhero." They travel to Davenport, Iowa, for his fight at Extreme Challenge 79 against Chris McDaniel. Sherron's coach and cornerman can't make the fight so Punkass and Spencer Fisher step in. Leggett submits McDaniel in the first round after catching him in a kimura lock.
9	Einstein	December 5, 2007	Scott Epstein	The crew meets Scott "Einstein" Epstein in Los Angeles through his coach, Eddie Bravo. They agree to sponsor him and immediately put him in a photo shoot for some new Tapout gear. Epstein is set to face Sergio Quinones at Xcess Fighting's inaugural Havoc in Hollywood event and on fight day the crew is worried that Epstein is too casual. Quinones gets the better of Epstein through much of the first two rounds but Epstein is able to use his jiu jitsu skills to choke him out in round two.
10		May 28, 2008		The crew revisits past fighters and previews the upcoming season.

== Season 2 ==
Episode number	Title	Original airdate	Fighter	Summary
11	Lighty and Glover	July 30, 2008	Scott Lighty; Glover Teixeira	The crew travels to San Luis Obispo, California, where they meet training partners Scott Lighty and Glover Teixeira. They decide to sponsor both fighters and take them to Palace Fighting Championship 6 in Lemoore, California. Lighty fights first. He splits open his opponent's forehead, forcing him to tap. Teixeira knocks out his opponent in just five seconds.
12	Dany Lauzon	August 7, 2008	Dan Lauzon	Dan Lauzon is the younger brother of UFC fighter Joe Lauzon. The crew recognize his potential but believe that his trainer is wrong for him. They introduce him to trainer Mark DellaGrotte before taking him to fight at World Championship Fighting. UFC president Dana White makes a guest appearance. Dan submits Frank Latina with a triangle choke in the first round. Following the broadcast, Joe Lauzon criticized the episode on his website.
13	Greg McIntyre	August 13, 2008	Greg McIntyre	The Tapout crew checks in with an old friend named Greg McIntyre in San Diego, California, who is re-entering the MMA world after having his colon removed as the result of an auto-immune disease. The crew heads to Throwdown Elite Training Facility to catch up with Greg and his trainer, UFC veteran Dean Lister. Tapout decides to sponsor Greg at the PURECOMBAT fight event in Visalia, California. Greg wins his fight against Richard Chavez by unanimous decision.
14	Johny and Jake	August 20, 2008	Jake Rosholt; Johny Hendricks	
15	Albert Manners	August 27, 2008	Albert Manners	The crew return to Hawaii to scout Albert Manners, who trains with B. J. Penn. They change his nickname from "Always Bad" to "Respect" and find him a permanent apartment. Although battling a knee injury and facing "baby mama drama," Manners overcomes his opponent by rear naked choke in the opening moments of the first round. Despite his victory, the Tapout crew express some reservations and hope that Manners will continue to mature both as a fighter and a person.
16	John and Julie	September 3, 2008	John Dodson; Julie Kedzie	Mask, Punkass and Skyskrape scout Dodson in Albuquerque, New Mexico. There they also meet Kedzie and decide to sign her as the first-ever female Tapout fighter. Dodson and Kedzie are the co-headliners at Battlequest 8 in Denver, Colorado. Kedzie is up first, fighting Angela Hayes. Kedzie dominates Hayes, taking her down and ground and pounding her before submitting her with an arm bar. Hometown favorite Vern Baca is Dodson's opponent. Dodson slams his opponent on his head in round two, forcing a referee stoppage.
17	Pat Curran	September 10, 2008	Pat Curran	Pat Curran trains under his cousin Jeff Curran at his gym in Crystal Lake, Illinois. Between training sessions, Pat gets his first tattoo and he, Jeff and the crew do an autograph session at a Chicago clothing store. At the official weigh-in, Pat gets his first look at his opponent, Lazar Stozadinovic. Lazar has fought another of Jeff's students and broke his jaw; Pat reviews footage of that fight. The fighters are scheduled to meet at XFO 23 in Crystal Lake. Pat dominates much of the first round with his grappling and ground and pound. He similarly dominates rounds two and three and wins a unanimous decision from the judges.
18	Travis Marx	September 17, 2008	Travis Marx	The crew travels to Salt Lake City, Utah, to scope out Travis Marx, an officer of the Utah Highway Patrol and a student of Jeremy Horn. Marx will be facing Steven Siler in the main event. Horn is helping to promote the event, so is unable to corner Travis because of the conflict of interest. Travis struggles through much of round one, including being bloodied by Siler, but ends the round with a takedown. He seems to be performing better in round two but Siler catches him in a triangle choke, forcing him to tap.
19	T. J. Cook	September 24, 2008	T. J. Cook	The guys travel to Ocala, Florida, and meet up with their friend Tommy "Trauma" Sauer and check out his fighter T. J. Cook.
20	Mike Campbell	October 1, 2008	Mike Campbell	The crew makes their way to Boston, Massachusetts, to scope out fighter Mike Campbell who is trained by Mark DellaGrotte, former trainer on The Ultimate Fighter Season 4 and trainer to UFC fighters Kenny Florian, Stephan Bonnar and Marcus Davis.
