= Victoria Elise =

American model

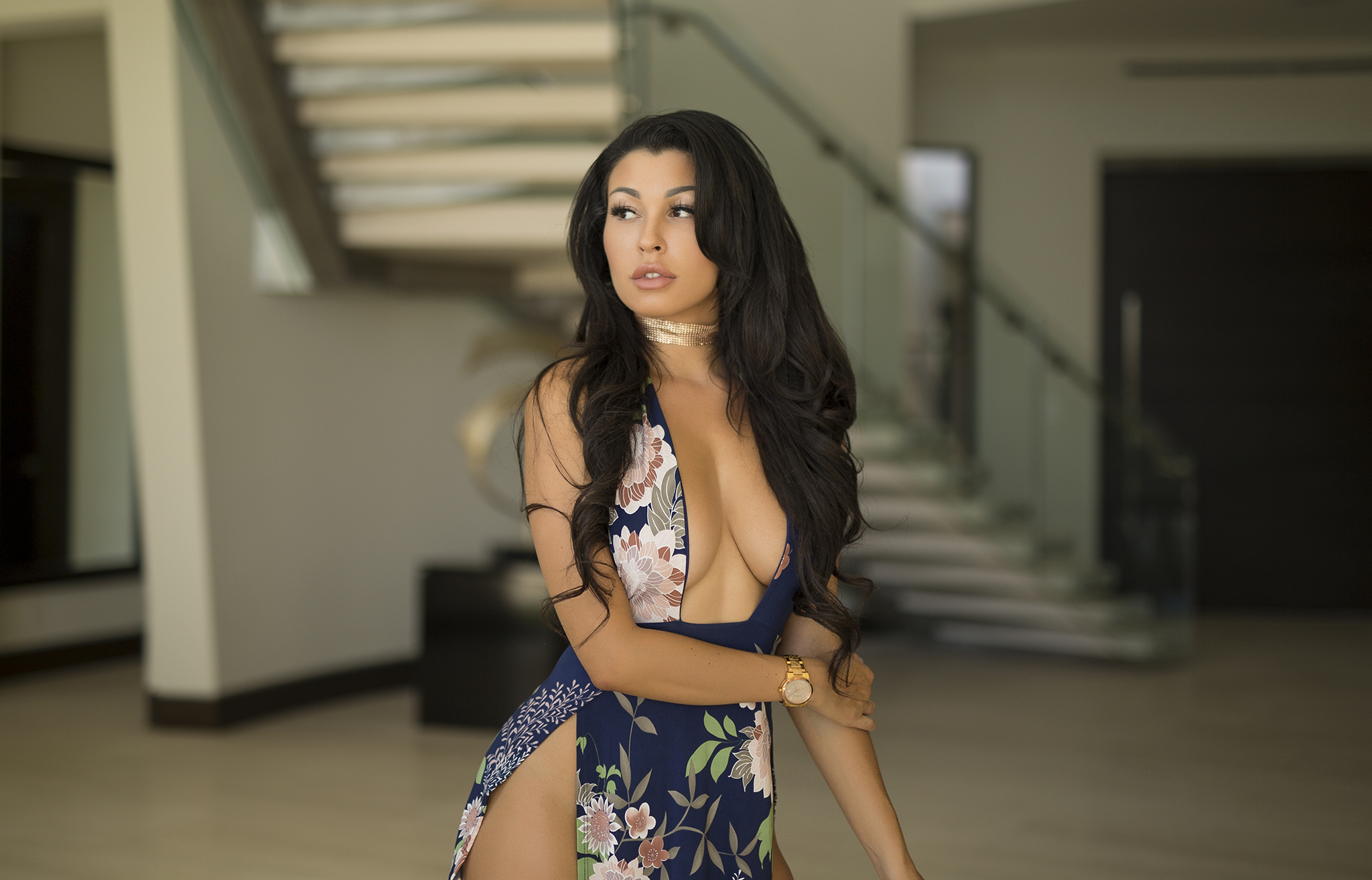
- Born: Würzburg, Germany
- Education: University of Nevada, Las Vegas
- Occupations: Model, entrepreneur
- Years active: 2008-present
- Modeling information
- Height: 5 ft 7 in (170 cm)
- Hair color: Black
- Eye color: Brown
- Website: www.elisexoxo.com

Victoria Elise is an American model born in Würzburg, Germany. During her career she has appeared on the covers or pages of magazines like Maxim, Sports Illustrated, Ask Men, Esquire and Playboy, among others, and has participated in advertising campaigns for brands like Miller Lite, Monster, Blue Moon and Fashion Nova.

== Biography ==
=== Early years ===
Born in Würzburg, Germany, on a United States Army base, Elise later settled with her family in El Paso, Texas, where she spent much of her childhood and adolescence and where she began her modeling career, appearing as a ring girl in Corona Boxing and MMA events.

=== Career ===
In the early 2010s she moved to Las Vegas, and has since appeared in the covers and pages of magazines like Sports Illustrated, AskMen, Esquire, Maxim, FHM and Playboy. In 2011 she was a semi-finalist in the Maxim Hometown Hotties contest organized by Maxim magazine, and two years later she appeared in an episode of the Bar Rescue series and in the music video for the song "Playin" by YG, Wiz Khalifa and Young Jeezy. In 2014 she starred in the video of "Ballin" by Rick Ross and Yowda.

In 2017 she competed in the Maxim's Finest contest, managing to advance again to the semi-finals in the overall group and finishing in the first position in the Top 10 of the West group. During her career she has participated in advertising campaigns for brands such as Monster Energy, Miller Lite, Fashion Nova, Blue Moon and Honeybum. Parallel to her work as a model, Elise is dedicated to stock trading.
