= EA Sports UFC 2 =

2016 video game

- Cover art featuring "Rowdy" Ronda Rousey and "The Notorious" Conor McGregor
- Developer: EA Vancouver
- Publisher: EA Sports
- Director: Brian Hayes
- Engine: Ignite
- Platforms: PlayStation 4 Xbox One
- Release: NA: March 15, 2016; EU: March 17, 2016
- Genres: Fighting, sports
- Modes: Single-player, multiplayer

EA Sports UFC 2 is a mixed martial arts fighting video game developed by EA Canada, and published in March 2016 by Electronic Arts for PlayStation 4 and Xbox One. The sequel to 2014's EA Sports UFC, it is based on the Ultimate Fighting Championship (UFC) brand. The game's cover art features "Rowdy" Ronda Rousey and "The Notorious" Conor McGregor.

Gameplay heavily resembles real UFC fights. The player can select from over 250 fighters and may customize various aspects of the fight, such as the rules. The fighter can perform an array of attacks, such as kicks, punches, grapples, submissions, and takedowns. The player can fight in a variety of game modes, including the career and ultimate team modes. The player can create customizable fighters and the game features both male and female fighters.

The game was announced in November 2015. When developing the game, EA Canada took into consideration a large amount of fan feedback that was given from the previous game. EA Canada hoped that by listening to fans' criticisms of the first game, EA Sports UFC 2 would be drastically improved over the previous game. Many additions were made in an effort to prove this.

EA Sports UFC 2 received generally positive reviews from critics upon release. Many publications were in agreement that the visuals were the game's strongest aspect. Other features that were praised include the improvements made over the previous game and the large roster of fighters. The main criticisms were concerning the lack of depth in some of the game modes, particularly the career mode, as well as the poor tutorials, and the inconsistent physics and controls.

Its sequel, EA Sports UFC 3, was released worldwide on February 2, 2018. The online servers for EA Sports UFC 2 were shut down on February 6, 2023.

== Gameplay ==
EA Sports UFC 2 is a mixed martial arts fighting game based on the Ultimate Fighting Championship (UFC). As such, the game strives to be as realistic as the real UFC as possible. The player may choose to play in a variety of game modes. For a regular UFC match, the player chooses a fighter and may customize several aspects of the fight, such as the opponent, the venue, and the rules. The objectives of the fight closely follow the rules of the real UFC. The player can utilize a variety of attacks, such as kicks, punches, submissions, and takedowns, in order to beat their opponent. Many aesthetical details are also present; for example, fighters will suffer visible damage during a fight. Other details include a crowd, referees, octagon girls, an announcer, and commentary from Joe Rogan and Mike Goldberg.

Aside from regular fights, the game features other modes, such as a career mode, an ultimate team mode, a practice mode, and a knockout mode. In the career mode, the player creates their own fighter and takes them through the ranks of the UFC. The player may customize several aspects of their own fighter, but they may also use one of the real fighters. The knockout mode is similar to regular fights, with the main difference that the player can only win by knockout. The fighters' stamina bars are also removed as the mode focuses on strikes instead of grapples or submissions. When in practice mode, the player can practice their skills against an idle opponent or complete drills. The ultimate team mode centers on building a deck of cards which represent fighters and playing against other players' decks. Players earn coins after each fight, which are used for customizing and upgrading fighters. Several online modes are also present.

The game features more than 250 playable characters; males and females are present. The referees are also expanded, with Herb Dean and Dan Miragliotta making their first appearance in this franchise along with Yves Lavigne and Mario Yamasaki. The game's artificial intelligence accommodates for changes in player strategies mid-game to make the gaming experience more realistic than in previous UFC games. The game also simulates "full body deformation" to connect players with their player-character. New features were introduced. The new Knockout Physics System allows players to knock out opponents dynamically based on finishing hits' momentum and strength. The career mode underwent changes, the most significant of which is the addition of female fighters. Grapple Assist, which is a visual tool that serves as a guide for the player, was added to the game. Submission, grappling, parrying, blocking were improved from the first game. Other features include Custom Event Creator, Title Chase, and a multiplayer championship mode.

== Development ==
EA Sports UFC 2 was announced on November 10, 2015, by publisher Electronic Arts. After the game's announcement, Electronic Arts announced that one of the cover fighters would be "Rowdy" Ronda Rousey. A while after, Electronic Arts announced that the result of UFC 194 would tell us who the other cover fighter would be. "The Notorious" Conor McGregor defeated his opponent José Aldo Jr. meaning he would be the second cover fighter.

The game was released on March 15, 2016, in North America and March 17, 2016, in Europe. Players who pre-ordered the game have the ability play as four additional fighters: Bas Rutten, Kazushi Sakuraba, and two different versions of Mike Tyson. Additionally, Bruce Lee, who was featured in the previous game, returns as a special unlockable fighter.

Developer EA Canada received feedback and complaints from players who played the original game and found that ground and clinch combat were too challenging, and that the game did not have sufficient modes. As a result, the team decided to improve the grapple mechanic in order to deliver an "on-boarding experience", and added five new modes to the game. According to Brian Hayes, the game's creative director, having impressive graphics is important for the game. They hoped to achieve this by updating and improving the game's lighting, animation and rendering system. The KO mode was designed for players that intend to play the game casually.

== Reception ==
Reception

Aggregate score
| Aggregator | Score |
|---|---|
| Metacritic | (PS4) 79/100 (XOne) 76/100 |

Review scores
| Publication | Score |
|---|---|
| Electronic Gaming Monthly | 7.0/10 |
| Eurogamer | 80% |
| Game Informer | 8.5/10 |
| GameRevolution | 4/5 |
| GamesMaster | 85% |
| GameSpot | 7/10 |
| GamesRadar+ | 3/5 |
| GamesTM | 70% |
| IGN | 6.4/10 |
| PlayStation Official Magazine – Australia | 70% |
| Official Xbox Magazine (UK) | 70% |
| Play | 80% |
| Polygon | 8/10 |
| Hardcore Gamer | 3.5/5 |

Awards
| Publication | Award |
|---|---|
| Forbes | Best Individual Sports Game |
| Forbes | Best Post-Release Support and Content |

EA Sports UFC 2 received "generally favorable" reviews from critics, according to review aggregator Metacritic.

Jeff Landa of Electronic Gaming Monthly scored the game a 7.0 out of 10. He summarized with, "EA Sports UFC 2 delivers the grandeur of MMA in a remarkable and brutal presentation. A traditional fighting game this is not, and the genuine attempts at simulating a dense sport result in clumsy combat that only on occasion captures the drama and nuance of human chess." Landa mostly criticized the "unintuitive" controls but he also disliked the unrealistic physics and the "bland" career mode. Landa's main praise was given to the visuals, which he thought "[Made] something so inherently vicious look outright stunning."

Game Informer's Brian Shea gave the game an 8.5 out of 10. He stated: "UFC 2 improves over its predecessor in the ways it needed to. The improved ground game and deeper career mode are the biggest draws, but Knockout mode is a blast to play with a friend, and Ultimate Team offers a unique twist on the popular mode from other sports games. If 2014's EA Sports UFC was a promise being made, UFC 2 is its deliverance." Shea also praised the visuals, particularly the design of the fighters, and criticized the repetitive commentary.

Devin Charles from Game Revolution scored the game 4 stars out of 5, saying: "A mix of power and finesse, both in ring and out, there's no doubt this is a solid pickup for folks interested in handing out beatings like their favorite MMA fighters do." Charles commended the large roster of fighters, the ultimate team mode, and the overall longevity that the game has been designed to have, saying that the game will remain relevant for its lifetime. Charles disliked the replay system, however, calling it "poor", and said that the game had a steep learning curve.

GameSpot's Richard Wakeling gave the game a 7 out of 10 and stated: "EA Sports UFC 2 is a welcome improvement on its predecessor that shows this series is going in the right direction." Wakeling called the visuals "incredible", praised the "robust" fighting mechanics, and commended the improvements made to several of the gameplay systems, such as the grappling. Wakeling criticized the lack of proper tutorials, and disliked the career mode for having enough depth.

GamesRadar''s David Meikleham wrote: "Bruising, buggy and beautiful, UFC 2 is a technically triumphant fighter, but its combat can easily flounder and frustrate." Meikleham scored the game a 3 out of 5, complimenting the visuals, ground game, and the knockdowns, but criticizing the lack of content, the career mode, and the power of strikes.

Josh Robertson from IGN gave the game a 6.4 out of 10, writing: "While UFC 2 certainly looks the part, it doesn't feel it. Strikes are razor sharp, kicks are satisfyingly heavy, and each and every fighter is beautifully sculpted and recreated, but each and every element is too robotic and rigid to recreate the dynamism and unpredictability that draws me to real UFC fights. Those fights are often won by finding those spaces between the lines that your opponent hasn't thought to cover, but those spaces simply don't exist here. As a fighting game it's worth your time if you're seeking something other than the usual options, but as a recreation of the UFC it falters before the final bell."

Owen S. Good of Polygon gave the game a positive review, scoring it an 8. He commended the realism, the difficulty balance, and the visuals. Good did find that the controls are uncomfortable at times and disliked the difficulty of the submission system. Good also shared the opinion that the career mode is too basic and that it lacks a personality.

Adam Beck for Hardcore Gamer gave the game a 3 out of 5 and wrote: "EA Sports Canada has improved upon the UFC formula greatly, although plenty of the modes still feel shallow. The career mode has been pushed to the side (literally) and rightfully so as it's the most lackluster campaign available. [...] It's more rewarding to play through the online-centric Championship mode despite it relying heavily on card packs and RNG pulls. Fortunately, there are far fewer glitches to be found, especially comparing this to the first game EA Sports released, although the physics still certainly go out of whack more than they should. [...] EA Sports UFC 2 still has some kinks to work out, but the overall experience has improved over its predecessor."

During the 20th Annual D.I.C.E. Awards, the Academy of Interactive Arts & Sciences nominated EA Sports UFC 2 for "Fighting Game of the Year".

=== Sales ===
UFC 2 reached number 2 in the UK physical sales chart, behind Tom Clancy's The Division. It reached number 2 in Australia, behind the same game. The game reached number 6 in the European PS4 download sales charts. It reached number 2 on the American physical chart, and 10 on the download chart. It was the 28th best selling game of 2016, and the 9th most downloaded PS4 game of 2017.

== Controversy ==
Khabib Nurmagomedov's appearance in EA Sports UFC 2 generated some controversy, as his character crosses himself with the Orthodox Christian sign of the cross (right to left) upon victory, despite Nurmagomedov being a Sunni Muslim. EA apologized and said they would rectify the error.
