= UFC Undisputed 3 =

2012 video game

- Cover art featuring Anderson Silva
- Developer: Yuke's
- Publisher: THQ
- Composer: Pride FC music composed by Yasuharu Takanashi
- Platforms: PlayStation 3, Xbox 360
- Release: NA: 14 February 2012; EU: 14 February 2012; AU: 16 February 2012; JP: 1 March 2012
- Genre: Sports
- Modes: Single-player, multiplayer

UFC Undisputed 3 is a mixed martial arts video game featuring Ultimate Fighting Championship properties and fighters developed by Yuke's and published by THQ. It was released for PlayStation 3 and Xbox 360. It is a sequel to UFC Undisputed 2010, making it the third and last game to be released under THQ's 2007 agreement with the UFC.

== Gameplay ==
UFC Undisputed 3 has improved and added changes from its predecessor, including the following:

- New THQ servers for online play and downloadable content. Since the closing of THQ, the servers are now closed.
- The addition of Pride Mode, with Pride rules, ring, and fighters. Pride Grand Prix has also been included, with the ability to have fights in the same night with damage moving onto the next fight. Commentary is provided by Bas Rutten and Stephen Quadros. Lenne Hardt announces the fighters in Pride in English, with Kei Grant announcing them in Japanese.
- A brand new submission system. New submission moves includes the standing rear naked choke, standing guillotine choke, and the flying scissor heel hook.
- Motion capture used for fighters for more realistic movement.
- New Stats: Footwork, Ground Grapple Top and Bottom for offense and defense.
- Fighter entrances and music.
- Two game play control options: traditional and simplified (Pro and Amateur controls).
- Leg kick TKO's, including leg breaks from blocked kicks.
- New KO animations. "Finish the Fight" allows you to continue punching an unconscious opponent until the referee pulls you off.
- Damage recovery between rounds.
- New Stamina system, where stamina can only come back up so far until you are fully rested. Cuts affect stamina and energy recovery rate.
- Redesigned striking game emphasizing jabs, quick strikes, and combinations. Elbow spamming has been fixed, with only certain fighters having elbows in clinch range. A fighter's reach is now a big part in striking, and new feint system and takedown-intercepting knees have been added.
- New clinch controls, including a new transition in the clinch to back control. Whip knees can be done to the body and can be blocked.
- Career Mode now allows players to go through roster fighters from the UFC and Pride, and stat decay has been abolished.
- New ground positions with the cage, including using the cage to set up submissions and "wall walking" back to a standing position.
- New options, such as Stamina Simulation mode, Competition Spec mode (removes all random elements such as flash KOs and doctor stoppages), and Stat Equalizer (equalizes all stats to 90 for both fighters).
- Fighters are now able to sway on the ground to avoid strikes.
- Sweeps are back from UFC 2009 Undisputed, including new ones.
- Venues available includes MGM Grand, Mandalay Bay, The O2, Bell Centre, Palms Casino Resort, and the Red Rock Resort Spa and Casino. Madison Square Garden returns from UFC 2009 Undisputed. Pride matches are realised on Saitama Super Arena and WFA matches are realised at The Joint.
- Mario Yamasaki, Herb Dean, Yves Lavigne, Josh Rosenthal, Dan Miragliotta and Kevin Mulhall are the referees available in the game.

== Development and release ==
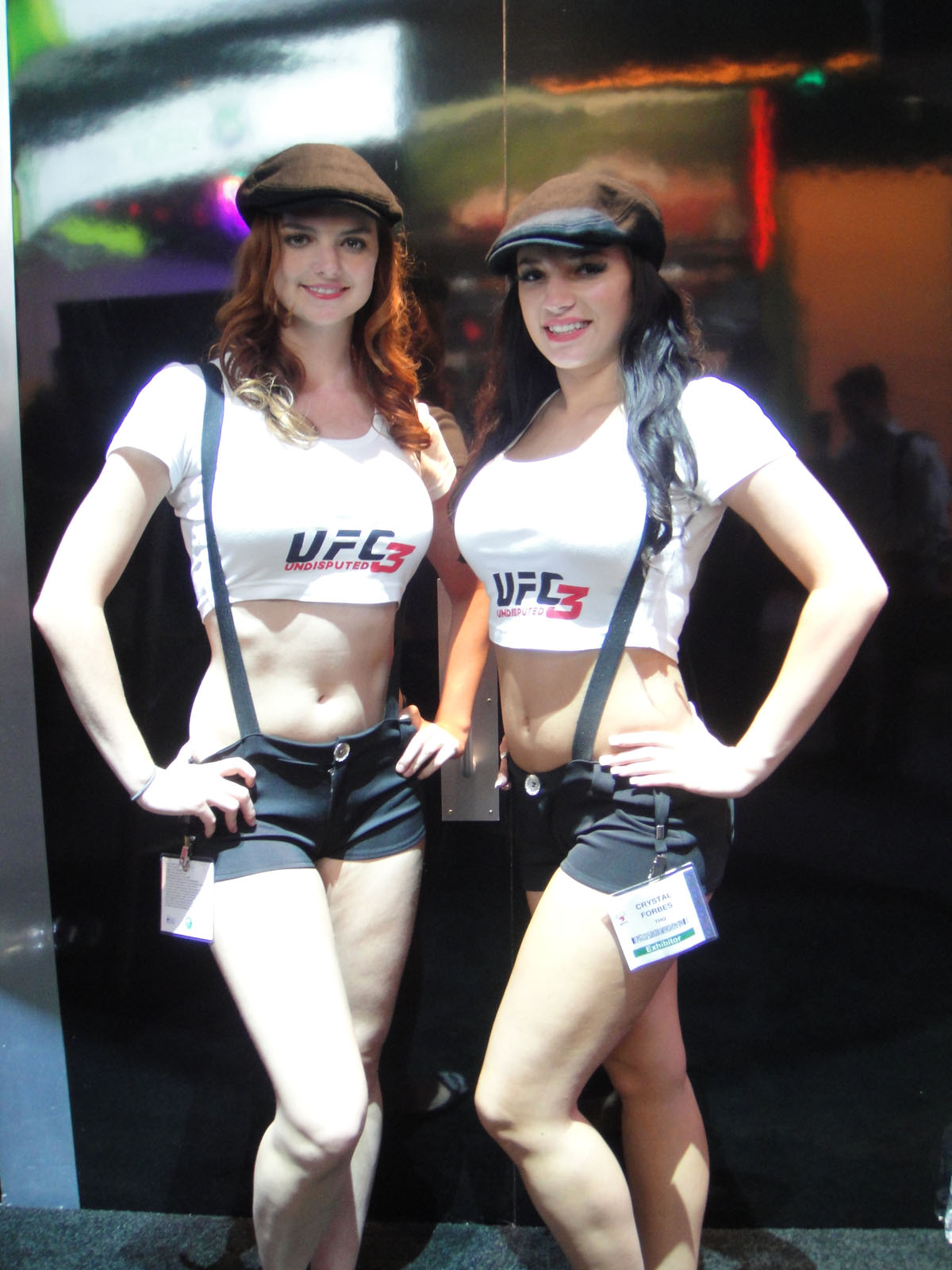
Promotion at E3 2011

The demo was released on 24 January 2012.

== Reception ==
Reception

Aggregate score
Aggregator	Score	
Aggregator	PS3	Xbox 360
Metacritic	86/100	85/100

Review scores
Publication	Score	
Publication	PS3	Xbox 360
Electronic Gaming Monthly	N/A	8.5/10
Eurogamer	N/A	8/10
Famitsu	36/40	36/40
Game Informer	8/10	8/10
GameRevolution	N/A	4.5/5
GameSpot	8/10	8/10
GameTrailers	N/A	8.7/10
GameZone	N/A	9/10
IGN	9/10	9/10
Joystiq	N/A	4.5/5
Official Xbox Magazine (US)	N/A	8.5/10
PlayStation: The Official Magazine	8/10	N/A
Digital Spy	N/A	4/5
Metro	N/A	8/10

The game received "generally favourable reviews" on both platforms according to the review aggregation website Metacritic. In Japan, Famitsu gave it a score of all four nines for a total of 36 out of 40.

Dan Plunkett of 411Mania gave the Xbox 360 version nine out of ten and called it "the best game of the series and the best mixed martial arts video game to date." Jeffrey Harris of the same website gave the PlayStation 3 version 9.6 out of 10 and said it was "really the MMA game we've been waiting for years. THQ really buckled down and the extra development time really paid off to make the game that much more special. EA MMA game [sic] was a good game, but it failed to deliver on a lot of levels and they didn't do enough to go above and beyond and truly outdo UFC Undisputed. THQ has now outdone all previous UFC Undisputed installments and EA MMA as well here." A little later on, Trace Aber of the same website gave both console versions nine out of ten and said: "UFC Undisputed 3 is far and away the best game in the series, and it's obvious that taking a year off worked. The game certainly feels familiar, but it's the subtle things they changed that make the most difference. It's a well-rounded experience that is a must-have for any MMA fan."

The Digital Fix gave the PS3 version eight out of ten and called it "the definitive MMA game". Digital Spy gave the Xbox 360 version a similar score of four stars out of five, calling it "a thoroughly enjoyable fighting game, striking a wonderful balance between shallow action and simulation. Personality issues aside, once the bell rings, the action is superb, offering incredible levels of strategy, not to mention some of the most impressive knockouts we've ever seen." Metro gave it a similar score of eight out of ten and called it "The premier MMA title that will appeal to all fight fans, whether you like the sport or not."

The game topped the UK sales charts for several weeks.

== Reboot ==
On 5 June 2012, it was announced that THQ had sold the UFC license to Electronic Arts and closed the studio that worked on the franchise. A new title, EA Sports UFC, was released on the PlayStation 4 and Xbox One consoles on 17 June 2014, followed by several sequels.
