= UFC Ultimate Insider =

UFC television series

- Presented by: Jon Anik
- Country of origin: United States

Production
- Running time: 30 minutes

Original release
- Network: FUEL TV; Fox Sports 2
- Release: February 7, 2012 – December 18, 2016

UFC Ultimate Insider was a weekly American sports television magazine show that profiled the MMA athletes and fights from the Ultimate Fighting Championship in a behind-the-scenes format, giving the viewer "unprecedented access" to the sport.

The 30-minute show debuts every week on FOX Sports 1 on Sundays at 5:30PM PST and 8:30PM ET. Prior to 2014, the show used to air on FUEL TV on Tuesdays at 10:30PM ET and 7:30PM PST. Re-airs can be watched throughout the week on FSN, MSG+ and Root Sports Networks. International viewers can watch a streaming version of the show through the UFC and YouTube.

== History ==
The show debuted July 29, 2010 as a web-only series which averaged 10–15 minutes in length, with over 50 archived shows still available to watch through the UFC website.

The original host of the web show was UFC Octagon girl and model Arianny Celeste, who introduced all the feature segments, interviews, highlights from previous events, and occasional photo shoots with the model.

After the UFC on Fox deal was announced in November 2011, FUEL TV stated that it would devote over 2,000 hours' worth of programming to the sport. UFC Ultimate Insider was tapped as one of the flagship weekly shows to air on FUEL TV, along with the show UFC Tonight.

== Format ==
The show features four different segments, each introduced by host Jon Anik in studio. According to the official show description, each week the show brings the viewer "in-depth fighter profiles, private training sessions, exclusive footage, and insider coverage you can't get anywhere else."

=== Segments ===
- On The Brink: An all-access pass with a superstar UFC fighter preparing for their next matchup, as behind-the-scenes cameras shadow them in the final 72 hours before the biggest fight of their careers. Chael Sonnen, Jon Jones, and Carlos Condit have all been separately featured in this segment.
- Rogan Riffs: The outspoken voice of the UFC, Joe Rogan sounds off and gives his unfiltered opinion on everything from PRIDE fighting to "The Ultimate Fighter" to who is the best "pound for pound" fighter.
- Ultimate 8: A classic "countdown" segment—counting down the best moments from inside and outside the Octagon from number 8 to 1.
- Full Blast: A lavalier microphone is put on a fighter, who gives exclusive commentary while he watches two other UFC fighters cageside. Georges St-Pierre was wired for sound at UFC 143 as Carlos Condit and Nick Diaz battled for the interim Welterweight belt.
- Counterpunch: Two rival fighters face-off in a screening room with host Jon Anik—and they watch, comment, and feud over their last fight; while previewing what to look forward to in their next fight. Urijah Faber and Dominick Cruz were the first fighters profiled in this segment.
- Signature Moves: A UFC fighter demonstrates his moves in super-slow motion; teaching their most powerful fight techniques with a specialized high-speed camera. Ben Henderson debuted this segment.
