= Charles Lewis Jr. =

American businessman (1963–2009)

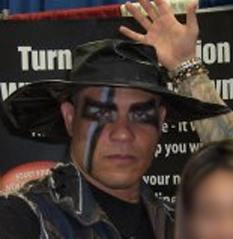
- Lewis in 2009
- Born: June 23, 1963; San Bernardino, California, US
- Died: March 11, 2009 (aged 45); Newport Beach, California, U.S.
- Other name: Mask
- Occupations: Businessman, entertainer
- Known for: TapouT co-founder and television personality
- Children: 2

Charles Lewis Jr. (June 23, 1963 – March 11, 2009) was an American businessman, promoter and entertainer. Known by his nickname "Mask", Lewis founded the Tapout clothing line in 1997, which eventually became a multimillion-dollar clothing company.

Mask was inducted into the UFC Hall of Fame in July 2009, becoming the first non-fighter to receive the honor. In 2014, he was inducted into the Martial Arts History Museum Hall of Fame.

== Career ==
=== Tapout ===
In 1997, Lewis and his two friends began selling mixed martial arts apparel from the back of their Mustang. By 2007, the company, "Tapout", had revenue of $22.5 million, with a 2009 target of $225 million. Lewis was known as "Mask", because of stripes of facepaint he frequently used.

== Death ==
Shortly before 1:00 am on March 11, 2009, Lewis died in a high-speed car crash in Newport Beach, California. His Ferrari 360 Challenge Stradale, a track-focused version of the Ferrari 360 Modena, collided with a 1977 Porsche before hitting a light pole. It is presumed that the two vehicles were traveling alongside one another at high speed. Lewis was declared dead at the scene. Twenty-three-year-old Lacy Lynn White, a female occupant of Lewis's Ferrari, was ejected from the vehicle and was taken to a hospital. She suffered a fractured elbow and lacerations. The driver of the Porsche was arrested for "alcohol-related gross vehicular manslaughter". As a tribute to his contributions to the UFC, Lewis was inducted into the UFC Hall of Fame at the UFC 100 Fan Expo, and Lewis's name was made a permanent feature on the inside of the door to the Octagon. He is buried at Mountain View cemetery in San Bernardino, California.

== Legacy ==
Named in his honor, the Charles "Mask" Lewis Fighter of the Year Award is presented annually at the World MMA Awards.

In 2009, Lewis was featured in the video game UFC 2009 Undisputed as an unlockable fighter along with "Skyskrape" and "Punkass" all not dressed in standard UFC attire but in TapouT clothes including hats, shirts, and shoes. Unlockable by achieving three consecutive submission victories in Career mode, he fights in the Light Heavyweight class.

In 2010, Lewis was also featured in UFC 2010 Undisputed alongside "Skyscrape" and "Punkass". All of them were still featured fully dressed in their TapouT clothing. This time they were unlockable by a code that can be entered in the main menu.

Released September 2011, the film Warrior was dedicated "In loving memory of our friend, Charles 'Mask' Lewis Jr.". The role of the fight promoter in this movie, played by co-producer and director Gavin O'Connor, was meant to be played by Charles Lewis Jr., had Lewis not been killed just before the shooting of the movie. A new film by British director Bobby Razak chronicles the life and death of Charles Lewis. Razak founded the media portion of TapouT and TapouT films. Mask is the first non-fighter to be inducted into UFC Hall of Fame.
