= Brittney Palmer =

American former octagon girl and actress (born 1987)

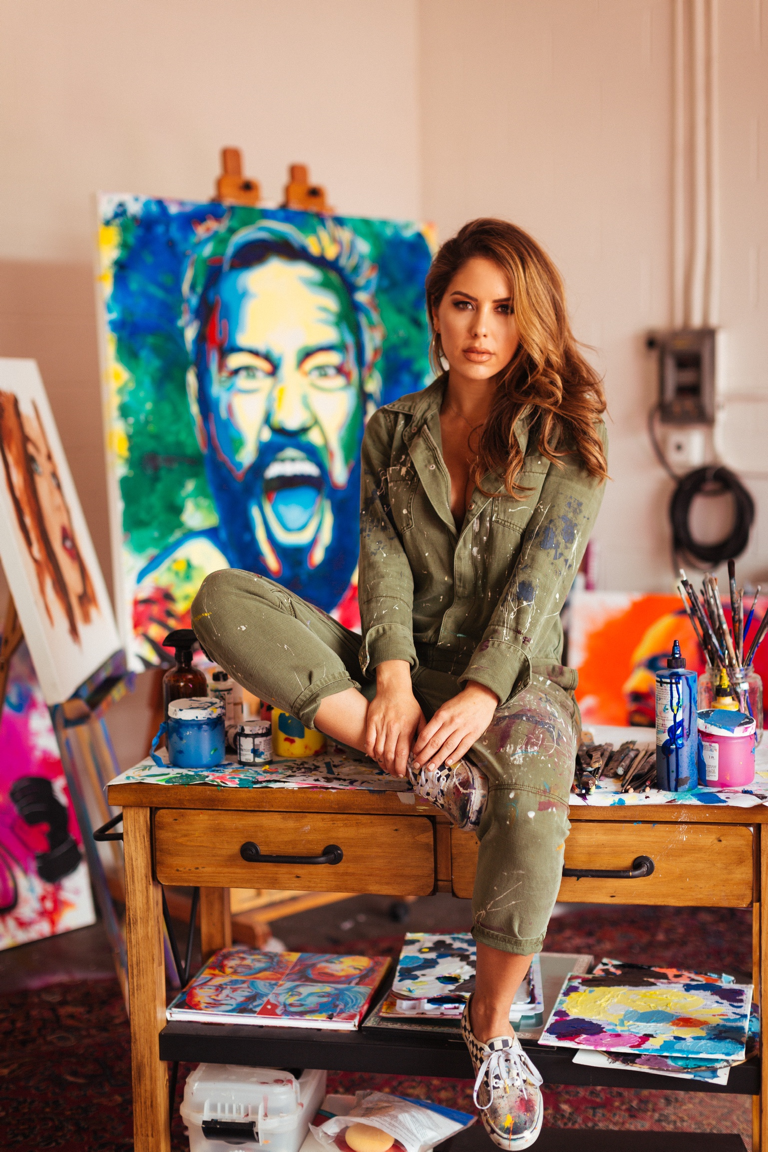
- Palmer with her paintings
- Born: June 24, 1987 (age 39); San Diego, California
- Occupations: Model; Artist; Former UFC Octagon Girl; Actress
- Years active: 2005–present
- Modeling information
- Height: 5 ft 6 in (1.68 m)
- Hair color: Brown
- Website: brittneypalmer.com

Brittney Palmer (born June 24, 1987) is an American model, actress, former ring girl, and artist. She worked as a ring card girl for World Extreme Cagefighting and later the Ultimate Fighting Championship. Palmer received the World MMA Award for Ringcard Girl of the Year six times, and announced her retirement from UFC appearances in December 2023, with UFC 296 serving as her final event. She has also worked as a contemporary artist, with portraits and abstract paintings exhibited in Los Angeles, Miami, New York, Hong Kong, and Milan.

== Early life ==
Palmer spent part of her early career in Las Vegas, where she worked as a professional dancer in shows including Jubilee at Bally's Las Vegas and Burlesque at the Flamingo Las Vegas. After being injured in a car accident at age 21, she began painting and later moved to Los Angeles, where she studied art at the University of California, Los Angeles.

Her artwork has been shown through gallery and fair presentation, including the galley STEINER at Red Dot Miami 2019 and the LA Art Show 2019.

== Career ==
Palmer first appeared as a ring card girl in World Extreme Cagefighting before transitioning to the UFC after the WEC talent base was folded into the promotion. She became a regular fixture at UFC events and appeared in magazine and promotional programming connected to the organization. In 2012, she appeared on the cover of Playboy.

Palmer received the World MMA Award for the Ringcard Girl of the Year in 2012, 2013, 2019-2020, 2021, 2022, and 2023.

In December 2023, Palmer announced her retirement from UFC appearances while accepting Ringcard Girl of the Year at the World MMA Awards. UFC 296 was her final event.

== Acting ==
She played Amy on a 2013 film Snake & Mongoose.

== Art ==
Alongside her UFC work, Palmer developed a career as a contemporary artist. Her work includes paintings and murals. In 2019, Artsy listed her work in fair booths for the gallery STEINER at Red Dot Miami and the LA Art Show. Since then, her work has been exhibited in Los Angeles, New York, and Milan.

In 2021, Palmer presented pop-up gallery shows titled Electric Flow at Park MGM in Las Vegas.

== Philanthropy ==
Palmer has used her artwork in charity-related projects. A 2021 profile stated that she worked with amfAR and UNICEF as a donating artist and supported Steven Tyler's Janie's Fund and Lady Gaga's Born This Way Foundation.
