= Jon Anik =

American sports commentator

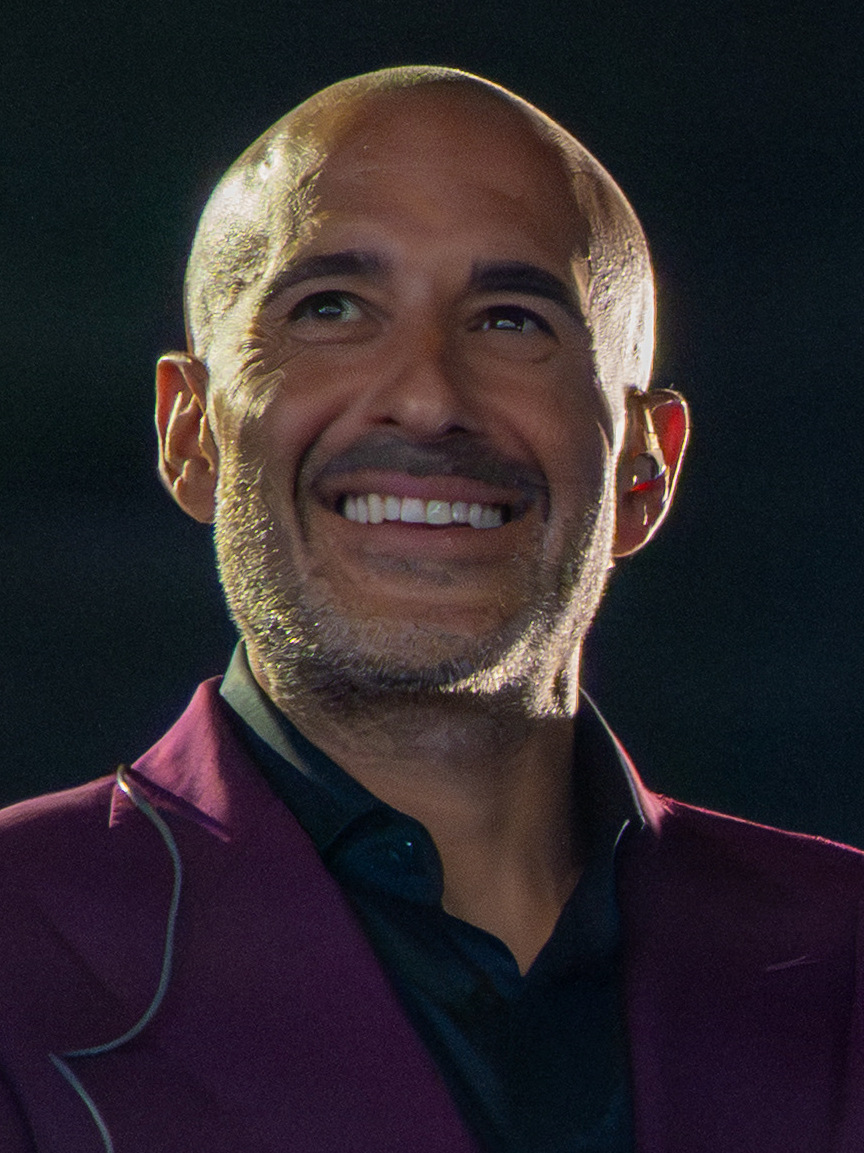
- Anik in 2026
- Born: July 3, 1978 (age 48); Boston, Massachusetts, U.S.
- Education: Gettysburg College
- Occupation: Mixed martial arts commentator

Jon Anik (born July 3, 1978) is an American mixed martial arts commentator. He began his career as an anchor with ESPN for over five years before moving to the Ultimate Fighting Championship (UFC) as a play-by-play commentator in 2012. Anik's expertise in MMA has made him a highly sought-after commentator for high-profile events, and his passion for sports commentary has earned him a loyal following among sports fans worldwide.

== Early life and education ==
Anik was born in Boston, Massachusetts and is Jewish. He has an identical twin brother and two other siblings. He graduated from The Rivers School in Weston, Massachusetts. In 1997 and enrolled at Gettysburg College, where he was a member of Theta Chi. He graduated with a degree in political journalism. Anik spent one semester at American University in Washington, D.C., working as an intern for the George Michael Sports Machine. He has also worked in the sports department of The MetroWest Daily News in Framingham, Massachusetts.

== Career ==
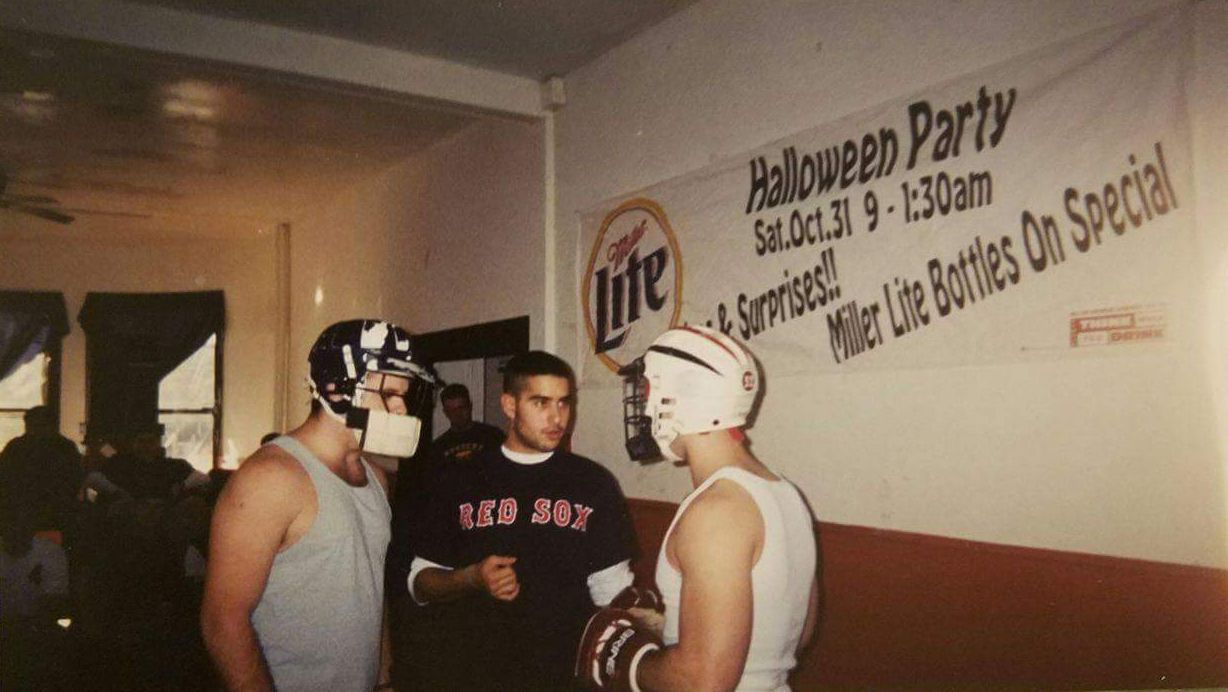
Jon Anik's first play-by-play was in 2000.

=== ESPN ===
Anik is a former ESPN anchor and the former host of MMA Live on ESPN2. He has anchored several live events for ESPN, including MMA Live's coverage of UFC 91, UFC 94, UFC 98, UFC 100, UFC 101, UFC 113, UFC 114 and UFC 126. From 2006 to 2008, Anik worked for ESPN Radio, where he anchored SportsCenter updates and served as a fill-in host on Game Night. He also did a weekly MMA chat every Wednesday for ESPN.com.

=== Ultimate Fighting Championship ===
In 2011, Dana White announced during a press conference that Jon Anik would be joining the UFC. Anik made his commentary debut during the international broadcast of UFC on FX: Guillard vs. Miller. He was the lead play-by-play announcer for some FX and FUEL TV fights with color commentator and former UFC fighter Kenny Florian. He is also the host of the UFC's flagship sports magazine show UFC Ultimate Insider. He filled in for Mike Goldberg to team with Joe Rogan at UFC 155. On September 22, 2014, Anik was a guest on Ariel Helwani's MMA Hour and announced that he had signed a new, longer-term contract with UFC. After losing a bet related to the outcome of the Nate Diaz vs. Conor McGregor fight at UFC 196, Anik was obliged to have a tattoo of the number 209, representing the area code of Diaz's hometown Stockton, California. Since Mike Goldberg's departure in 2017, Anik has assumed the role of the UFC's main play-by-play commentator for all pay-per-view events.

On October 22, 2018, Anik revealed that he had signed a four-year contract extension with the UFC. Subsequently, he was re-signed by the organization in 2022.

== Other appearances ==
Anik has made several radio and TV appearances, including ESPN programs SportsNation, The Scott Van Pelt Show, The Herd with Colin Cowherd, and The Doug Gottlieb Show. Other appearances include: ESPN Radio 1100 in Las Vegas, ProMMA Radio, MMAjunkie Radio, MMA Weekly Radio, The MMA Hour, the Sherdog Radio Network, and also featured on the ESPN UFC podcast every week with his "Anik-dotes".

Anik was the play-by-play voice for Season 1 of Bellator Fighting Championships. Anik co-starred in the MMA feature film Warrior as he states "I was pleasantly surprised when I got the script that I had six wardrobe changes," Anik told MMAjunkie.com Radio. "I guess I was surprised I had that many lines. I don't know how many made the final cut, though.

As of April 2015, Anik and former UFC commentator Kenny Florian started the Anik-Florian podcast. On the podcast mixed martial arts, sports and pop culture are discussed.

Anik covered the Canelo vs. Crawford card, which took place from the Allegiant Stadium on September 13, 2025. He served as the play-by-play commentator.

== Personal life ==
Anik and his wife Chrissy have three children.
