= Tapout (clothing brand) =

American clothing brand

Tapout Inc.
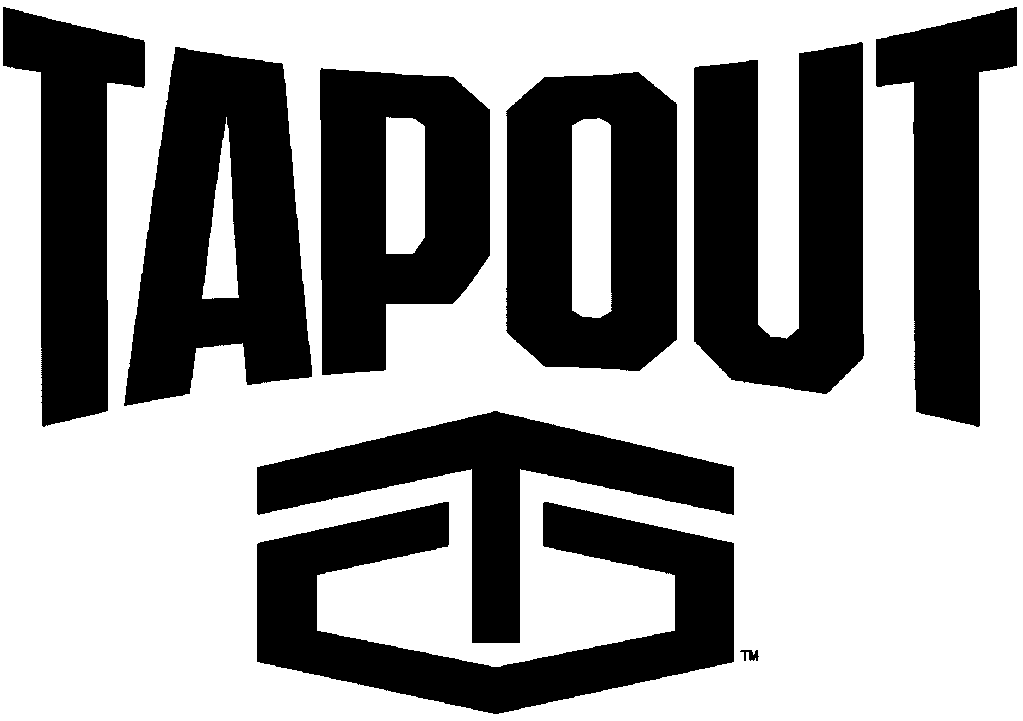
- Company type: Joint-venture
- Founded: 1997; 29 years ago
- Founder: Charles Lewis Jr. and Dan Caldwell
- Headquarters: Grand Terrace, California, United States
- Area served: Worldwide
- Products: Clothing, footwear, sporting equipment accessories
- Owner: WWE (50%); Authentic Brands Group (50%)
- Website: tapout.com

Tapout Inc. is an American multinational corporation that designs and manufactures sports clothing, casual apparel, and accessories headquartered in Grand Terrace, California. It was the largest distributor of MMA merchandise in the world by 2007, and became one of the dominant brands in activewear and fitness culture.

Tapout was registered in 1997 in San Bernardino County, California, by Charles Lewis, Jr. and Dan Caldwell, with the name a reference to the gesture of tapping the floor to admit defeat to an opponent in a match. Selling the merchandise during a period when MMA solely reached a niche market, Lewis and Caldwell branded the company around the sport, distributing the merchandise in cities where the sport was prevalent. However, following the growing popularity of mixed martial arts in the United States, and its later nationwide mainstream acceptance, the company became the largest MMA-related merchandise company in the world, accruing revenues of over $22.5 million in 2007.

In March 2015, the company was relaunched following its joint-ventured acquisition by pro-wrestling company WWE, and development firm Authentic Brands Group. The venture saw the former MMA-related brand transformed into a more general "lifestyle fitness" one. The apparel, for men and women was released in spring of 2016. Throughout 2015, WWE marketed the brand through various products, including beverages, supplements and gyms. WWE will hold a 50% stake in the brand, and so will advertise it regularly across all its platforms, hoping to give it one billion impressions a month, and attempting to rival sports-clothing giant, Under Armour. All employees and students of the WWE Performance Center will also wear the clothing.

== History ==
=== Origins, initial success and sale ===
Tapout was founded by Charles Lewis, Jr. and Dan Caldwell in 1997 in San Bernardino. The idea for the company occurred when both men noticed the lack of mixed martial arts merchandise. Later that year, Lewis took on some new partners in, Tim Katz and Bobby Razak who founded Tapout Films and the media portion of the company. The majority of their initial sales were made at underground MMA fights, and their revenue reached about $29,000 in 1999. Lewis and Fields later began to distribute the merchandise in other cities where the then-niche sport was prevalent. However, due to the growth of popularity and acceptance of mixed martial arts in the United States in the following years, the company would continue to grow. Due to this rapid rise, Tapout was able to officially sponsor various high-profile fighters, including Rashad Evans, Dan Hardy, Thiago Alves and Chael Sonnen. This rapid growth led to the company becoming the largest distributor of MMA merchandise in the world, recording revenue of about $200 million in 2009.

On June 3, 2007, Lewis created and produced the reality television series Tapout. The show followed him as he searched the United States for up-and-coming mixed martial arts fighters. It aired for two seasons on cable channel Versus, before being cancelled. It also gave birth to a short-lived radio show, and was the official apparel brand for The Ultimate Fighter during its run on Spike.

On March 11, 2009, Charles Lewis Jr. died in a high-speed car crash in Newport Beach, California. Lewis's Ferrari 360 Challenge Stradale collided with an unidentified 1977 Porsche before hitting a light pole. It is also presumed that the two vehicles were traveling alongside one another at high speed, with Lewis being declared dead at the scene. Lacy Lynn White, a twenty-three-year-old female occupant of Lewis's Ferrari, was ejected from the vehicle and was taken to a hospital, suffering a fractured elbow and lacerations. The driver of the Porsche, Jeffrey David Kirby of Costa Mesa, was arrested for "alcohol-related gross vehicular manslaughter".

As a tribute to his contributions to UFC, Lewis was posthumously inducted into the UFC Hall of Fame at the UFC 100 Fan Expo, as well as his name being made a permanent feature on the inside of the door to the Octagon. Katz and Caldwell, as well as the fans in attendance, held a minute's silence for Lewis. Following his death, the remaining founders decided to sell Tapout, which was bought by Authentic Brands Group in 2010.

=== Relaunch with ABG, in conjunction with WWE ===
Following ABG's absorption of Tapout, the firm looked to re-brand the company. The firm reached out to wrestling entertainment company WWE in attempts to form a working relationship. WWE, who deal primarily in professional wrestling, came to an agreement with ABG in March 2015 to relaunch Tapout as a joint-venture.

The venture saw the former MMA-related brand transformed into more general "lifestyle fitness" apparel and was released in 2014. WWE marketed the brand through various products, including beverages, supplements and gyms.

== See also ==
- Mixed martial arts clothing
