= UFC 2009 Undisputed =

2009 video game

- International cover art featuring Forrest Griffin, alternate versions feature Georges St-Pierre
- Developer: Yuke's
- Publisher: THQ
- Platforms: PlayStation 3, Xbox 360
- Release: NA: 19 May 2009; AU: 21 May 2009; EU: 22 May 2009; JP: 15 October 2009
- Genre: Sports (Fighting)
- Modes: Single-player, multiplayer

UFC 2009 Undisputed, also known as UFC Undisputed 2009, is a mixed martial arts video game featuring Ultimate Fighting Championship properties and fighters developed by Yuke's and published by THQ. The game was released for PlayStation 3 and Xbox 360. It is the first game to be released under THQ's 2007 agreement with the UFC, and was the first UFC game released since UFC: Sudden Impact in 2004. A playable demo of UFC 2009 was released onto Xbox Live and PlayStation Network on 23 April 2009, and featured a tutorial and exhibition matchup between Chuck Liddell and Mauricio Rua. A sequel, UFC Undisputed 2010, was released on 25 May 2010.

== Fighting styles ==
The developers at Yuke's included 6 major primary fighting styles for the fighters in the game; Striking: Boxing, Kickboxing, and Muay Thai, Grappling: Brazilian Jiu-Jitsu, Judo, and Wrestling. These styles are placed into two categories, allowing a character to have one of the fighting styles from each of these categories. For example: Georges St. Pierre has Kickboxing and Wrestling as his two fighting styles. The "standup" category allows Boxing, Muay Thai or Kickboxing, while grappling-style can consist of Brazilian jiu-jitsu, Wrestling or Judo.

== Miscellaneous ==
- In the May 2009 issue of Fight! Magazine, THQ highlighted some of the setbacks they faced during the game's development as a result of various clipping issues within the collision detection. They stated that they removed rising UFC star Clay Guida from the roster due to the clipping issues presented by his lengthy hair on his character model and it was rumored that Dana White even offered him $10,000 to cut it but he refused, this was refuted by Guida in an interview with Pro MMA Radio where he stated that he would have done anything to be in the game including cutting his hair but simply wasn't asked. Southpaw stances were also excluded for clipping issues. As such, southpaw fighters like Rich Franklin fight with the Orthodox stance in the game.
- TapouT crew members Charles Lewis Jr. (Mask) and Punkass are unlockable playable characters by progressing through career mode. Skyscrape is unlockable with a code.
- The Ultimate Fighter season 8 winners Ryan Bader and Efraín Escudero, formerly available only through an exclusive pre-order code from GameStop, were made available for purchase through XBLA and PSN on 10 September 2009.

== Reception ==
Reception

Aggregate score
Aggregator	Score	
Aggregator	PS3	Xbox 360
Metacritic	84/100	83/100

Review scores
Publication	Score	
Publication	PS3	Xbox 360
Edge	N/A	7/10
Eurogamer	N/A	8/10
Famitsu	33/40	33/40
Game Informer	8/10	8/10
GamePro	5/5	5/5
GameRevolution	B+	B+
GameSpot	8/10	8/10
GameSpy	4.5/5	4.5/5
GameTrailers	8.9/10	N/A
GameZone	8.8/10	8.5/10
Giant Bomb	4/5	4/5
IGN	7.6/10	7.6/10
Official Xbox Magazine (US)	N/A	8.5/10
PlayStation: The Official Magazine	4/5	N/A
411Mania	7.9/10	N/A
Teletext GameCentral	7/10	N/A

The game received "favourable" reviews on both platforms according to the review aggregation website Metacritic. In Japan, Famitsu gave it a score of one nine and three eights for a total of 33 out of 40. Some reviews cited the lack of a penalty for users who disconnect from online games as a negative aspect, along with lag in online play. Although recently, there had been a patch that must be downloaded, that is preventing "cheating" with the CAF program, by stopping a bug that players were able to exploit an error in the CAF system, that allowed artificial "pumping up" of the CAF's ability meters. This patch is also supposed to be able to track those players that disconnect in an attempt to falsely prevent losses from showing up on the CAF's Win–loss record. It is also supposed to try to prevent lag issues, by matching up players with similar connection speeds. Hyper's Daniel Wilks commended the game for its "very deep, intricate fighting system [and] balanced striking and ground game." However, he criticized it for its "very steep learning curve [and] very niche appeal".

According to NPD figures, UFC 2009: Undisputed managed to sell over 1,000,000 units in its first month. 679,600 of these sales came on the Xbox 360, with 334,400 coming on the PlayStation 3. By February 2010, the game sold 3.5 million copies.

At the 2009 Spike Video Game Awards, UFC 2009 Undisputed was named the Best Individual Sports Game. During the 13th Annual Interactive Achievement Awards, the Academy of Interactive Arts & Sciences nominated UFC 2009 Undisputed for "Fighting Game of the Year".
