= Ultimate Fighting Championship =

American mixed martial arts promotion company

- Trade name: UFC
- Type: Subsidiary
- Industry: Mixed martial arts; Streaming media
- Founded: November 12, 1993; 33 years ago
- Founders: Art Davie; Bob Meyrowitz; Campbell McLaren; David Isaacs; John Milius; Rorion Gracie
- Headquarters: UFC Performance Institute; 6650 S Torrey Pines Drive, Enterprise, Nevada, United States
- Area served: Worldwide
- Key people: Ari Emanuel (CEO, TKO Group Holdings); Dana White (President and CEO); Hunter Campbell (CBO)
- Products: Home video; Live events; Merchandise; Publishing; TV; Video on demand
- Services: Licensing
- Revenue: ▲US$1.502 billion (2025)
- Operating income: ▲US$851 million (2025)
- Parent: TKO Group Holdings (Note: Vince McMahon is the largest individual shareholder, with a 3.25% stake in TKO Group Holdings.)
- Divisions: UFC Apex; UFC Brazilian Jiu-Jitsu; UFC Fight Pass
- Website: UFC.com

The Ultimate Fighting Championship (UFC) is an American mixed martial arts (MMA) promotion company based in the Las Vegas, Nevada, area. It is owned and operated by TKO Group Holdings, itself a majority owned subsidiary of the WME Group. The largest MMA promotion in the world, the UFC has over 578 fighters contracted that fight across 11 weight divisions (eight men's and three women's). The organization produces events worldwide and abides by the Unified Rules of Mixed Martial Arts. As of 2026, it had held over 750 events. Dana White has been its president since 2001 and CEO since 2023. Under White's stewardship, it has grown into a global multi-billion-dollar enterprise.

The UFC was founded by businessman Art Davie, martial artist Rorion Gracie, and film director John Milius, with the backing of Semaphore Entertainment Group (SEG) CEO Bob Meyrowitz, President David Isaacs, and Head of Programming Campbell McLaren. The first event was held in 1993 at McNichols Sports Arena in Denver, Colorado. The purpose of the UFC's early competitions was to identify the most effective martial art in a contest with minimal rules and no weight classes between competitors of different fighting disciplines. In subsequent events, more rigorous rules were created and fighters began adopting effective techniques from more than one discipline, which indirectly helped create a separate style of fighting known as present-day mixed martial arts.

The UFC was initially owned by SEG until it developed financial problems and was sold to the brothers Frank and Lorenzo Fertitta in 2001, who formed the company Zuffa to operate the UFC, and placed Dana White as the president of the company. In 2016, UFC's parent company, Zuffa, was sold to a group led by Endeavor, then known as William Morris Endeavor (WME–IMG), including Silver Lake Partners, Kohlberg Kravis Roberts and MSD Capital for US$4.025 billion. In 2021, Endeavor bought out Zuffa's other owners for $1.7 billion.

With a TV deal and expansion in Australia, Asia, Europe, and new markets within the United States, the UFC has achieved greater mainstream media coverage. It earned US$609 million in 2015, and its previous domestic media rights agreement with ESPN was valued at $1.5 billion over a five-year term. The UFC has also purchased and absorbed rival organizations such as PRIDE Fighting Championships, World Extreme Cagefighting, and Strikeforce, consolidating much of the global MMA market under its banner.

In April 2023, Endeavor Group Holdings announced that UFC would merge with the wrestling promotion WWE to form TKO Group Holdings, a new public company majority-owned by Endeavor, with Vince McMahon serving as an executive chairman of the new entity and White remaining as UFC president. The merger was completed on September 12, 2023. In January 2024, McMahon had ended his ties with the company amid a sex trafficking scandal. In 2025, the UFC signed a 7-year, US$7.7 billion deal with Paramount Skydance (operators of CBS Sports and Paramount+) beginning the next year, exiting the pay-per-view business entirely.

== History ==
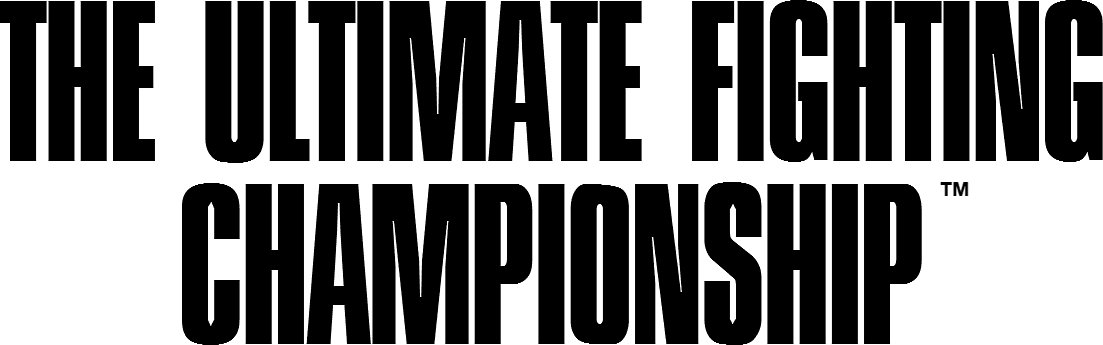
The former logo of the UFC, used from 1993 to 1999

=== Early 1990s competition ===
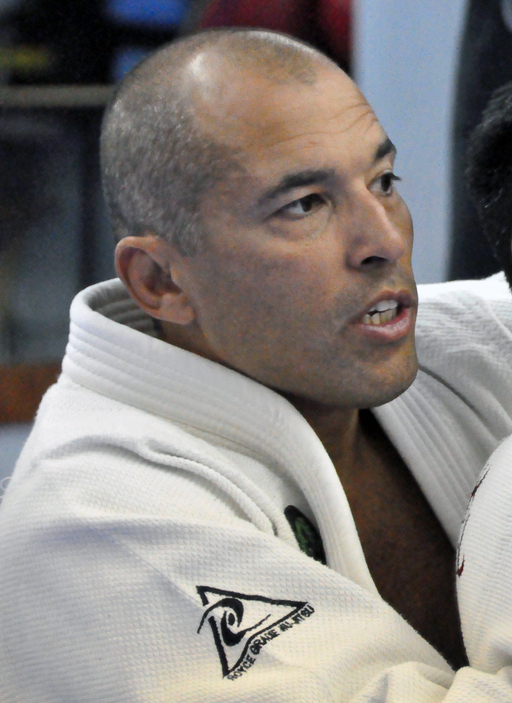
Royce Gracie used Brazilian jiu-jitsu in the early years of UFC to defeat opponents of greater size and strength.

Art Davie proposed to John Milius and Rorion Gracie an eight-man single-elimination tournament called "War of the Worlds". It was inspired by the "Gracies in Action" video-series produced by the Gracie family of Brazil which featured Gracie jiu-jitsu students defeating martial artists of various disciplines such as karate, kung fu, and kickboxing on Vale Tudo matches. The tournament would also feature martial artists from different disciplines facing each other in no-holds-barred combat to determine the best martial art, and would aim to replicate the excitement of the matches Davie saw on the videos. Gracie accepted, as he was interested in showcasing and promoting his family's own jiu-jitsu for a wide audience. Milius, a film director/screenwriter and Gracie student, agreed to be the event's creative director. Davie drafted the business plan, and 28 investors contributed the initial capital to start WOW Promotions to develop the tournament into a television franchise.

In 1993, WOW Promotions sought a television partner and approached pay-per-view producers TVKO (HBO) and SET (Showtime), and Campbell McLaren and David Isaacs at Semaphore Entertainment Group (SEG). Both TVKO and SET declined, but SEG—a pioneer in pay-per-view television that had produced such offbeat events as a tennis match between Jimmy Connors and Martina Navratilova—became WOW's partner in May 1993. UFC promoters initially pitched the event as a real-life fighting video game tournament similar to Street Fighter and Mortal Kombat. SEG contacted video and film art director Jason Cusson to design a fighting arena for the event. Rorion and Davie didn't want a traditional roped ring, citing fears—by showing old Vale Tudo footage—that the fighters could escape through the ropes during grappling and use it as an advantage, or fall off and hurt themselves. SEG's executives agreed, and also wanted a way to visually differentiate their event from professional boxing and professional wrestling. Some ideas included a traditional roped-ring surrounded by netting, a moat with alligators, a raised platform surrounded by razor-wire fence, electrified fencing, men in togas and netting that could be lowered from the ceiling by a pulley. Eventually Cusson designed an arena with eight sides surrounded by chain-link fence, the trademarked Octagon, which became the event's signature setting. Cusson remained the group's production designer through UFC 27. SEG devised the show's name as "The Ultimate Fighting Championship".

WOW Promotions and SEG produced the first event, later retroactively called UFC 1, at McNichols Sports Arena in Denver, Colorado on November 12, 1993. Art Davie was its booker and matchmaker. It proposed to find answers for sports fans' questions such as, "Can a wrestler beat a boxer?" As with most martial arts at the time, fighters typically had skills in just one discipline and little experience against opponents with differing skills. The television broadcast featured kickboxer Kevin Rosier, taekwondo practitioner Patrick Smith, savate fighter Gerard Gordeau, karate expert Zane Frazier, shootfighter Ken Shamrock, sumo wrestler Teila Tuli, boxer Art Jimmerson, and 175 lb (79 kg) Brazilian jiu-jitsu black belt Royce Gracie—younger brother of UFC co-founder Rorion, whom Rorion selected to represent his family. Royce's submission skills proved the most effective in the inaugural tournament, earning him the first ever UFC tournament championship after submitting Jimmerson, Shamrock, and Gordeau in succession. The show was extremely successful, with 86,592 pay-per-view television subscribers.

It's disputed whether the promoters intended the event to be a precursor to future events. "That show was only supposed to be a one-off", eventual UFC president Dana White said. "It did so well on pay-per-view they decided to do another, and another. Never in a million years did these guys think they were creating a sport." Davie, in his 2014 book Is This Legal?, an account of the creation of the first UFC event, disputes the perception that the UFC was seen by WOW Promotions and SEG as a one-off, since SEG offered a five-year joint development deal to WOW. He says, "Clearly, both Campbell and Meyrowitz shared my unwavering belief that War of the Worlds (Note: The original working title for UFC) would be a continuing series of fighting tournaments—a franchise, rather than a one-night stand."

With no weight classes, fighters often faced significantly larger or taller opponents. Keith "The Giant Killer" Hackney faced Emmanuel Yarbrough at UFC 3 with a 9-inch height and 400 pounds (180 kg) weight disadvantage.

During this early phase of the organization, the UFC showcased a bevy of styles and fighters. Aside from the aforementioned Royce Gracie, Ken Shamrock, and Patrick Smith, they also featured competitors such as Hall of Famer Dan Severn, Marco Ruas, Gary Goodridge, Don Frye, Kimo Leopoldo, Oleg Taktarov, and Tank Abbott.

==== Evolution of the rules and format ====
Although UFC used the tagline "There are no rules" in the early 1990s, the UFC did in fact operate with limited rules. In a UFC 4 qualifying match, competitors Jason Fairn and Guy Mezger agreed not to pull hair—as they both wore pony tails tied back for the match. The UFC had a reputation, especially in the early days, as an extremely violent event.

UFC 5 introduced the first singles match, a rematch from the inaugural UFC featuring three-time champion Royce Gracie and Ken Shamrock, called "The Superfight". Gracie and Shamrock developed a rivalry after UFC 1 and were the biggest stars of early UFC, but the tournament format proved unreliable to match both competitors. "The Superfight" began as a non-tournament match that would determine the first reigning UFC Champion for tournament winners to face; it later evolved into a match that could feature either title matches or non-title matches.

This first "Superfight" at UFC 5 was generally considered a disappointment. In the first minute of the fight Shamrock knocked Royce to the ground and landed inside his guard. For the next 30 minutes Shamrock was inside Royce's guard, with the two throwing punches and headbutts at each other, without any change or broadly visible action, and the crowd booed the fighters. After 30 minutes the fight was stopped as it had exceeded the time limit allocated for the pay-per-view and was given another 5 minutes of extra time due to protests from the spectators. The fight was over after 36 minutes and a draw was declared. Because of this controversial fight, the UFC would later start to introduce time limits, judges to decide draws, and authorized referees to stand up fighters and restart the bout if they have too much inactivity.

The UFC continued to offer one-night tournaments intermittently. UFC 9 was the first event to feature exclusively singles bouts, before the return of tournament in the next events. UFC 12 in 1997 introduced two weight categories: heavyweight and lightweight, marking the beginning of the UFC's transition from its original openweight format. The lightweight division was later divided into middleweight and welterweight, while the heavyweight division was divided into heavyweight and light heavyweight. UFC 17 in 1998 was the last event to feature a tournament, with UFC Brazil: Ultimate Brazil onwards featuring only singles bouts. The format was briefly revived for UFC 23: Ultimate Japan 2 in 1999, which was ultimately the final UFC event to feature a one-night tournament, after which the tournament format was discontinued in favor of individual bouts and championship matches. The tournament format was later used on two occasions to determine champions for vacant divisional titles. In 2003, the UFC held a lightweight tournament following the vacancy of the UFC Lightweight Championship and in 2012, the format was used again for the newly established flyweight division, with a tournament held to determine the inaugural UFC Flyweight Champion. These tournaments were held across multiple events rather than on one night, and the UFC continued to use individual bouts and championship matches as its standard format.

In April 1995, following UFC 5 in Charlotte, North Carolina, Davie and Gracie sold their interest in the franchise to SEG and disbanded WOW Promotions. The Gracies left the UFC after disagreements with SEG over the direction of the promotion. The introduction of time limits and referee stoppages, and plans for judges and weight classes conflicted with the Gracies' original philosophy for the UFC, which wanted to emphasize virtually unrestricted fights without time limits or weight classes and required bouts to end decisively. Davie, meanwhile, viewed the UFC's increasingly difficult political and financial environment as a reason to sell. Mounting opposition from politicians and state authorities made it increasingly difficult to stage events, while the promotion was also facing financial and operational difficulties. He nevertheless remained with SEG as the UFC's booker and matchmaker, and later as its commissioner, until 1997.

In 1996, the UFC had its first event outside continental United States with UFC 8 in Bayamón, Puerto Rico, and in 1997, UFC Japan: Ultimate Japan was its first foreign event.

=== Late 1990s controversy and reform ===
The violent nature of the burgeoning sport quickly drew the attention of U.S. authorities.

In 1996, U.S. Senator John McCain saw a tape of the first UFC events and immediately found it abhorrent. He led a campaign to ban the UFC, calling it "human cockfighting", and sent letters to the governors of all 50 US states asking them to ban it.

Thirty-six states enacted laws that banned "no-holds-barred" fighting, including New York, which enacted the ban on the eve of UFC 12, forcing it to relocate to Dothan, Alabama. The UFC continued to air on DirecTV PPV, though its audience remained minuscule compared to the era's larger cable pay-per-view platforms.

In response to the criticism, the UFC increased cooperation with state athletic commissions and modified its rules to remove the less palatable elements of fights while retaining the core elements of striking and grappling. Starting with UFC 12, bouts were divided into weight classes and fish-hooking (such as pulling on the mouth) was banned. In UFC 14, gloves became mandatory, and kicks to the head of a downed opponent were banned. UFC 15 saw limitations on hair pulling, and the banning of strikes to the back of the neck and head, headbutting, small-joint manipulations, and groin strikes. Five-minute rounds were introduced at UFC 21. The UFC gradually rebranded itself as a sport rather than a spectacle. These rules changed the game of many fighters, such as Mark Coleman, who had made potent use of headbutts for his ground-and-pound tactics, which were banned with the new rule set.

Led by UFC commissioner Jeff Blatnick and referee John McCarthy, the UFC continued to work with state athletic commissions. Blatnick, McCarthy, and matchmaker Joe Silva created a manual of policies, procedures, codes of conduct, and rules to help in getting the UFC sanctioned by the athletic commissions, many of which exist to this day. Blatnick and McCarthy traveled around the country, educating regulators and changing perceptions about a sport that was thought to be bloodthirsty and inhumane. By April 2000, their movement had clearly made an impact. California was set to become the first state in the U.S. to sign off on a set of codified rules that governed MMA. Soon after, New Jersey adopted the language.

As the UFC continued to work with the athletic commissions, events took place in smaller U.S. markets, and venues, such as the Lake Charles Civic Center. The markets included states that are largely rural and less known for holding professional sporting events, such as Iowa, Mississippi, Louisiana, Wyoming, and Alabama. SEG could not secure home-video releases for UFC 23 through UFC 29. With other mixed martial arts promotions working towards U.S. sanctioning, the International Fighting Championships (IFC) secured the first U.S. sanctioned mixed martial arts event, which occurred in New Jersey on September 30, 2000. Just two months later, the UFC held its first sanctioned event, UFC 28, under the New Jersey State Athletic Control Board's "Unified Rules".

=== 2001 and the beginning of Zuffa era ===
After the long battle to secure regulatory approval (sanctioning), SEG stood on the brink of bankruptcy, when Station Casinos executives Frank and Lorenzo Fertitta and their business partner Dana White approached them in 2000, with an offer to purchase the UFC. A month later, in January 2001, the Fertittas bought the UFC for $2 million and created Zuffa, LLC as the parent entity controlling the UFC.

"I had my attorneys tell me that I was crazy because I wasn't buying anything. I was paying $2 million and they were saying 'What are you getting?'" Lorenzo Fertitta revealed to Fighters Only magazine, recalling the lack of assets he acquired in the purchase. "And I said 'What you don't understand is I'm getting the most valuable thing that I could possibly have, which is those three letters: UFC. That is what's going to make this thing work. Everybody knows that brand, whether they like it or they don't like it, they react to it.'" Along with the trademark, they acquired a wooden octagon and around a dozen fighter's contracts. Later on, they negotiated a deal to buy UFC's DVD rights from Lionsgate for an additional two million dollars.

Lorenzo Fertitta was a former member of the Nevada State Athletic Commission. Aided by this relationship, Zuffa secured regulatory approval to operate in Nevada in 2001. Shortly thereafter, the UFC returned to pay-per-view cable television, with UFC 33 featuring three championship bouts.

==== Struggle for survival and turnaround ====
The UFC slowly rose in popularity after the Zuffa purchase, due partly to greater advertising, corporate sponsorship, the return to cable pay-per-view, and subsequent home video and DVD releases.

White later said that "Nobody took us seriously, except Donald Trump. Donald was the first to recognize the potential that we saw in the UFC, and encouraged us to build our business". With larger live gates at casino venues like the Trump Taj Mahal and the MGM Grand Garden Arena, the UFC secured its first television deal with Fox Sports Net. The Best Damn Sports Show Period aired the first mixed martial arts match on American cable television in June 2002, as well as the main event showcasing Chuck Liddell vs. Vitor Belfort at UFC 37.5. Later, FSN would air highlight shows from the UFC.

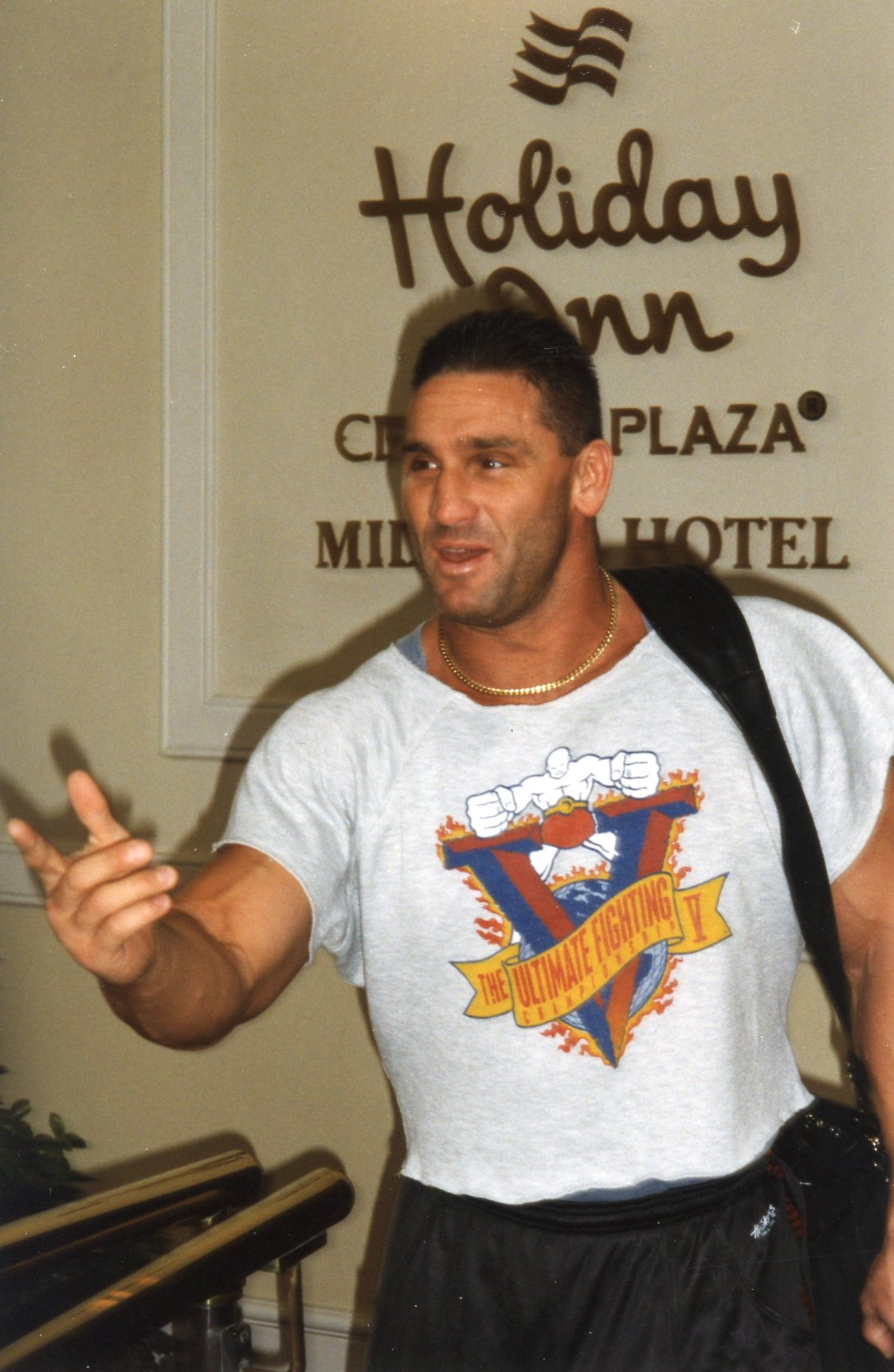
UFC Hall of Famer Ken Shamrock was instrumental in the UFC's turnaround into a mainstream sport.

UFC 40 proved to be the most critical event to date in the Zuffa era. The event was a near sellout of 13,022 at the MGM Grand Arena and sold 150,000 pay-per-view buys, a rate roughly double that of the previous Zuffa events. The event featured a card headlined by a championship match between then-current UFC Light Heavyweight Champion Tito Ortiz and former UFC Superfight Champion Ken Shamrock, who had previously left to professionally wrestle in WWE before returning to MMA. It was the first time the UFC hit such a high mark since being forced "underground" in 1997. UFC 40 also garnered mainstream attention from media outlets such as ESPN and USA Today, something that was unfathomable for mixed martial arts at that point in time. Many have suggested that the success of UFC 40 and the anticipation for Ortiz vs. Shamrock saved the UFC from bankruptcy; the buyrates of the previous Zuffa shows averaged a mere 45,000 buys per event, and the company was suffering deep monetary losses. The success of UFC 40 provided a glimmer of hope for the UFC, and kept alive the hope that mixed martial arts could become big. Beyond the rivalry itself, the success of UFC 40 was due in part to the marketing and outreach power of crossover athletes – from Pro Wrestling to MMA and MMA to Pro Wrestling – a practice with roots in Japan's Pride Fighting Championships. Long time UFC referee John McCarthy said that he felt UFC 40 was the turning point in whether or not the sport of MMA would survive in America.

"When that show (UFC 40) happened, I honestly felt like it was going to make it. Throughout the years, things were happening, and everything always looked bleak. It always looked like, this is it, this is going to be the last time. This is going to be the last year. But, when I was standing in the Octagon at UFC 40, I remember standing there before the Ortiz/Shamrock fight and looking around. The energy of that fight, it was phenomenal, and it was the first time I honestly said, it's going to make it." –"Big" John McCarthy

Despite the success of UFC 40, the UFC was still experiencing financial deficits. By 2004, Zuffa had $34 million in losses since they purchased the UFC.

==== The Ultimate Fighter and the rise in popularity ====
Faced with the prospect of folding, the UFC stepped outside the bounds of pay-per-view and made a foray into television. After being featured in a reality television series, American Casino, and seeing how well the series worked as a promotion vehicle, the Fertitta brothers developed the idea of UFC creating its own reality series.

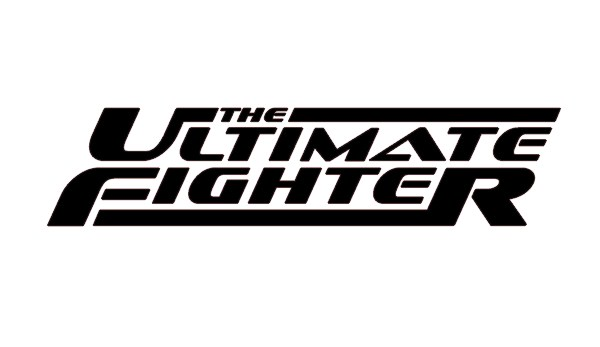
Logo of The Ultimate Fighter

Their idea, The Ultimate Fighter (TUF), was a reality television show featuring up-and-coming MMA fighters in competition for a six-figure UFC contract, with fighters eliminated from competition via exhibition mixed martial arts matches. It was pitched to several networks, each one rejecting the idea outright. Not until they approached Spike TV, with an offer to pay the $10 million production costs themselves, did they find an outlet.

In January 2005, Spike TV launched The Ultimate Fighter 1 (TUF 1) in the timeslot following WWE Raw. The show became an instant success, culminating with a notable season finale brawl featuring light heavyweight finalists Forrest Griffin and Stephan Bonnar going toe-to-toe for the right to earn the six-figure contract. The live broadcast of the season finale drew a very impressive 1.9 overall rating. Dana White credits TUF 1 for saving the UFC, and claims that the contract for the second season was made outside of the venue on a napkin immediately after the finale.

On the heels of the Griffin/Bonnar finale, a second season of The Ultimate Fighter launched in August 2005, and two more seasons appeared in 2006. Spike and the UFC continued to create and air new seasons until the show moved to FX in 2012.

Following the success of The Ultimate Fighter, Spike also picked up UFC Unleashed, an hour-long weekly show featuring select fights from previous events. Spike also signed on to broadcast live UFC Fight Night, a series of fight events debuting in August 2005, and Countdown specials to promote upcoming UFC pay-per-view cards.

With the upcoming announcement of the UFC's new relationship with Fox, Spike officials made a statement regarding the end of their partnership with the UFC, "The Ultimate Fighter season 14 in September will be our last... Our 6-year partnership with the UFC has been incredibly beneficial in building both our brands, and we wish them all the best in the future."

With the announcement of UFC's partnership with Fox in August 2011, The Ultimate Fighter, which entered its 14th season in that September, moved to the FX network to air on Friday nights starting with season 15 in the Spring of 2012. Along with the network change, episodes are now edited and broadcast within a week of recording instead of a several-month delay, and elimination fights are aired live.

=== Mid-2000s expansion ===
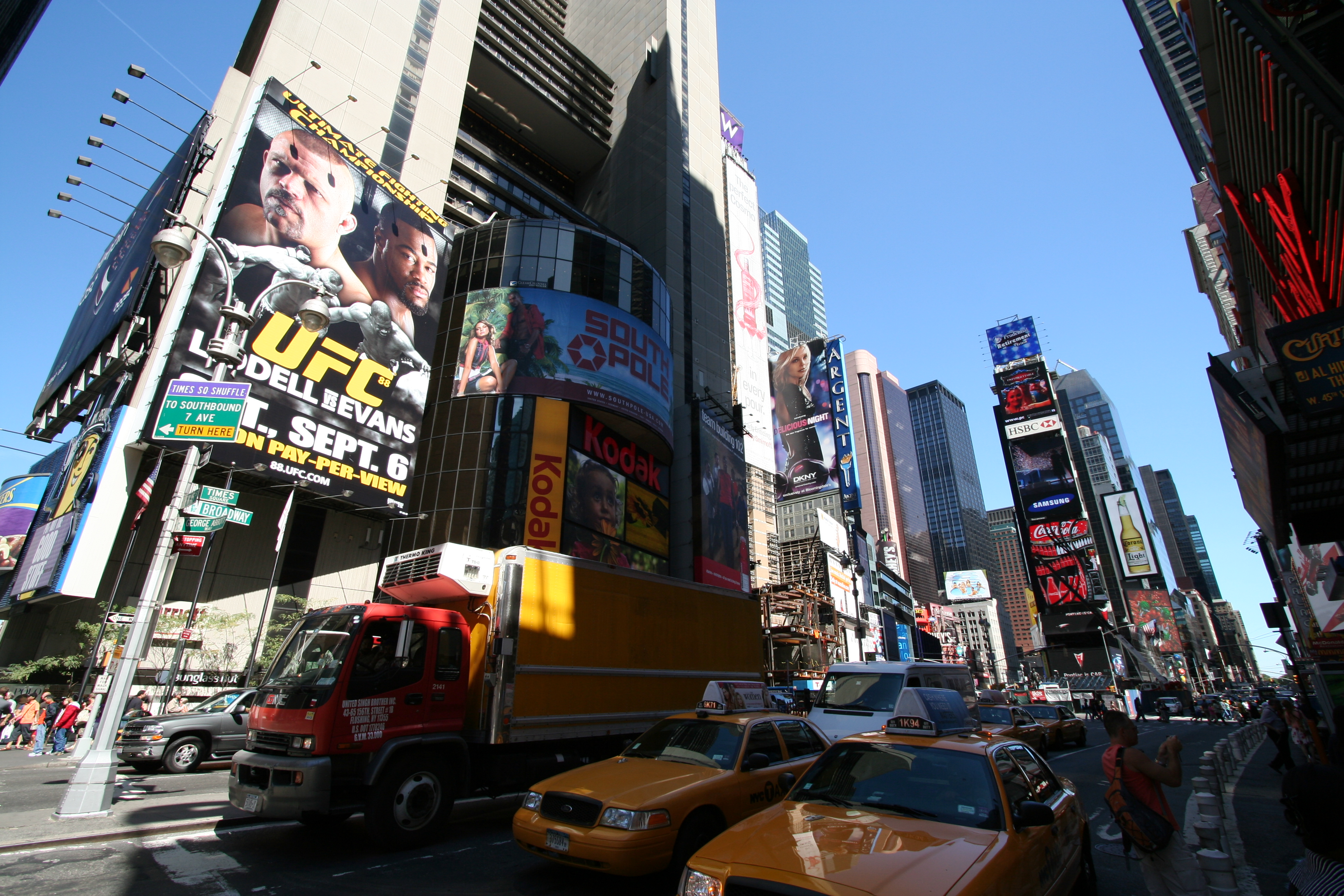
New York City Times Square ad for UFC 88: Breakthrough featuring Chuck Liddell vs. Rashad Evans

With increased visibility, the UFC's pay-per-view buy numbers exploded. UFC 52, the first event after the first season of The Ultimate Fighter featuring eventual-UFC Hall of Famer: Chuck "The Iceman" Liddell, avenging his defeat to fellow eventual-Hall of Famer, Randy Couture, drew a pay-per-view audience of 300,000, doubling its previous benchmark of 150,000 set at UFC 40. Following the second season of The Ultimate Fighter, the UFC's match between Liddell and Couture drew an estimated 410,000 pay-per-view buys at UFC 57.

For the rest of 2006, pay-per-view buy rates continued to skyrocket, with 620,000 buys for UFC 60: Hughes vs. Gracie — featuring Royce Gracie's first UFC fight in 11 years—and 775,000 buys for UFC 61 featuring the highly anticipated rematch between Ken Shamrock and Tito Ortiz, the coaches of The Ultimate Fighter 3. The organization hit a milestone with UFC 66, pitting Ortiz in a rematch against Liddell with over 1 million buys.

The surge in popularity prompted the UFC to beef up its executive team. In March 2006, the UFC announced that it had hired Marc Ratner, former executive director of the Nevada Athletic Commission, as Vice President of Regulatory Affairs. Ratner, once an ally of Senator McCain's campaign against no holds barred fighting, lobbied numerous athletic commissions to help raise the UFC's media profile in an attempt to legalize mixed martial arts in jurisdictions inside and outside the United States that had yet to sanction the sport.

In December 2006, Zuffa acquired the northern California-based promotion World Extreme Cagefighting (WEC) in order to stop the International Fight League (IFL) from making a deal with Versus (now NBC Sports Network). At the time, the UFC had an exclusive deal with Spike, so the purchase of the WEC allowed Zuffa to block the IFL from Versus without violating their contract. The WEC showcased lighter weight classes in MMA, whereas the UFC featured heavier weight classes.

In December 2006, Zuffa also acquired their cross-town, Las Vegas rival World Fighting Alliance (WFA). The WFA had signed major fighters at the time, most notably Quinton "Rampage" Jackson and Lyoto Machida, but their events turned out to be a financial disaster. Zuffa bought select assets from WFA, including select fighter contracts, as well as trademarks and other intellectual property.

The sport's popularity was also noticed by the sports betting community as BodogLife.com, an online gambling site, stated in July 2007 that in 2007 UFC would surpass boxing for the first time in terms of betting revenues. In fact, the UFC had already broken the pay-per-view industry's all-time records for a single year of business, generating over $222,766,000 in revenue in 2006, surpassing both WWE and boxing.

The UFC continued its rapid rise from near obscurity with Roger Huerta gracing the cover of Sports Illustrated and Chuck Liddell on the front of ESPN The Magazine in May 2007.

==== Pride acquisition and integration ====
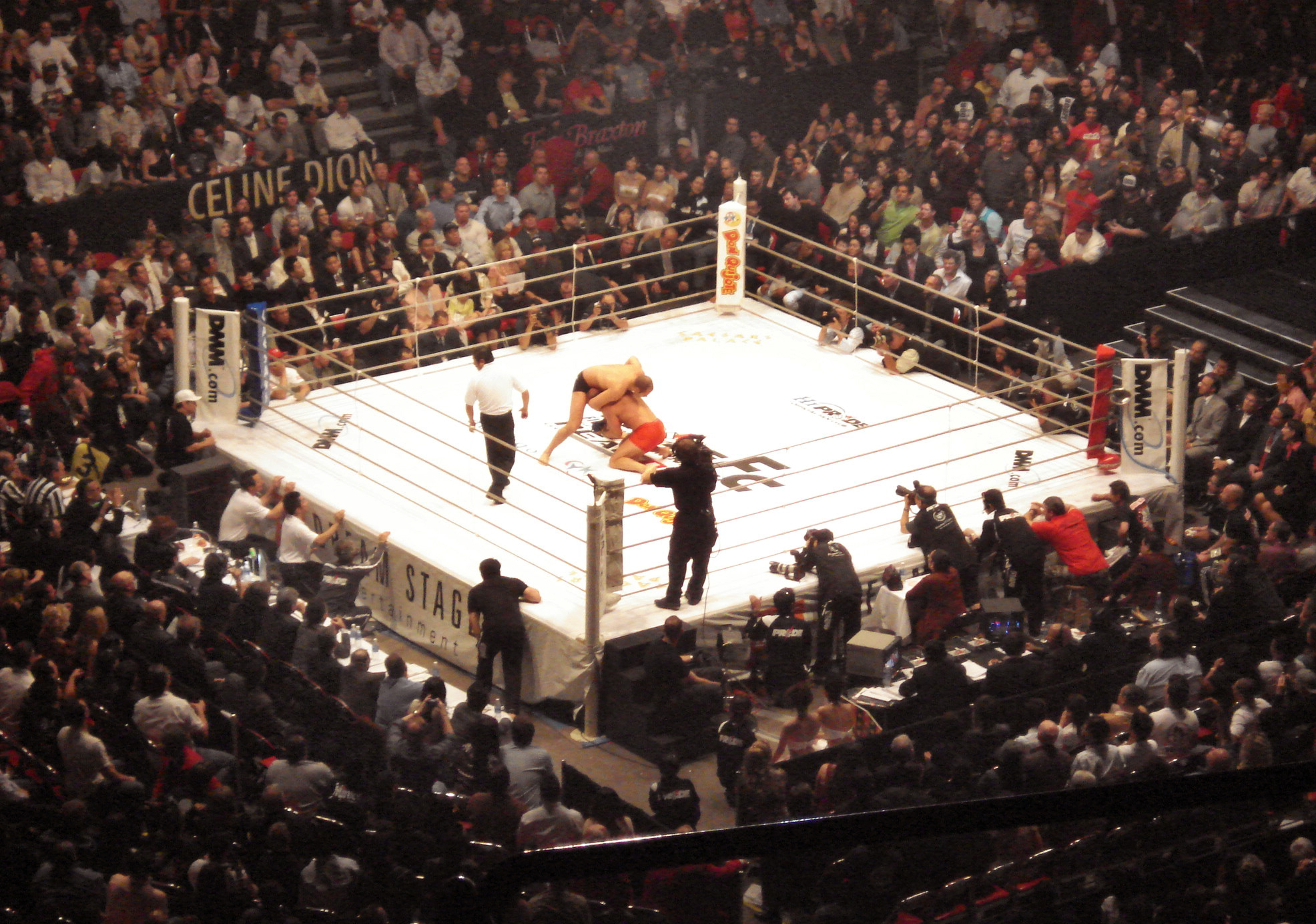
A fight between Fedor Emelianenko and Mark Coleman in the Japanese, ring-based PRIDE organization. During its heyday, PRIDE was considered bigger than the UFC in terms of audience and quality of fights.

In Japan, Mixed Martial Arts took a separate, yet convergent evolution, with origins in "shoot wrestling", a form of professional wrestling which had more realistic-looking moves and matches while deemphasizing theatrical elements. Promotions like Shooto and Pancrase discarded the scripts and were already putting on hybrid fighting shows with real fights by the time the UFC was founded. This culminated in the creation of Pride Fighting Championships in 1997. At its height, Pride was the world's most popular MMA promotion, and helped to popularize the sport in Japan and in the world. Having high attendances on large sports arenas and watched by millions of spectators through free-to-air and pay-per-view television. Meanwhile, the UFC was struggling with political persecution, low pay-per-view sales, and doing events in backwater casinos. At that time, many of UFC's best fighters would leave to fight in Pride or other Japanese organizations instead due better pay and prestige.

However, in 2006, Pride started to have financial issues due to the termination of lucrative contracts with Japanese TV due a scandal revealing the strong ties between Pride and the yakuza. On March 27, 2007, the UFC and Pride announced an agreement in which the majority owners of the UFC, Frank and Lorenzo Fertitta, would purchase the Pride brand.

Initial intentions were for the organizations to be run separately but aligned together with plans to co-promote cards featuring the champions and top contenders from both organizations, making comparisons to the AFL–NFL merger and the creation of a "Super Bowl" of MMA. However, after purchasing Pride, Dana White felt that the Pride model was not sustainable and that the brand became "toxic" in Japan, being difficult to find a new television deal. The organization instead folded, with many former Pride fighters such as Antônio Rodrigo "Minotauro" Nogueira, Maurício "Shogun" Rua, Dan Henderson, Mirko "Cro Cop" Filipović, Wanderlei Silva, and others already being realigned under the UFC brand. On October 4, 2007, Pride Worldwide closed its Japanese office, laying off 20 people who were working there since the closing of its parent company Dream Stage Entertainment (DSE).

On June 18, 2008, Lorenzo Fertitta accommodated the UFC's growth by announcing his resignation from Station Casinos in order to devote his energies to the international business development of Zuffa, particularly the UFC. The move proved to be pivotal, as Fertitta helped strike TV deals in China, France, Mexico, and Germany as well as open alternative revenue streams with a new UFC video game and UFC action figures, among other projects.

=== Late 2000s–mid-2010s growth with UFC 100 ===
Popularity surged in 2009 with UFC 100 and the 10 events preceding it including UFC 90, 91, 92, 94, and 98. UFC 100 was a success, garnering 1.6 million buys under the drawing power of former NCAA wrestling and WWE Champion Brock Lesnar and his rematch with former UFC Heavyweight Champion Frank Mir, Canadian Georges St-Pierre going head-to-head with Brazilian Thiago Alves, and American Dan Henderson opposing British Michael Bisping at middleweight after the two were rival coaches on The Ultimate Fighter: United States vs. United Kingdom.

UFC 100 drew interest from ESPN, which provided coverage of the event in the days preceding and following it. ESPN would eventually devote additional coverage of the UFC and other MMA news with the television debut of MMA Live on ESPN2 in May 2010.

The buzz from UFC 100 was hampered significantly in the second half of 2009 after a rash of injuries and other health-related issues—including Brock Lesnar's life-threatening bout with diverticulitis—forcing the organization to continuously scramble and reshuffle its lineup for several events.

However, the momentum gradually began to pick up in the first quarter of 2010 after victories from defending champions Georges St-Pierre and Anderson Silva, as well as Lyoto Machida's first career defeat to "Shogun" Rua for the UFC Light Heavyweight title. These fights segued into a very popular clash between former UFC Champions and rivals Rashad Evans and Quinton "Rampage" Jackson—rival coaches on The Ultimate Fighter 10: Heavyweights—at UFC 114, featuring the UFC's first main event headlined by black fighters. The event scored over 1 million pay per view buys as Evans secured a unanimous decision victory.

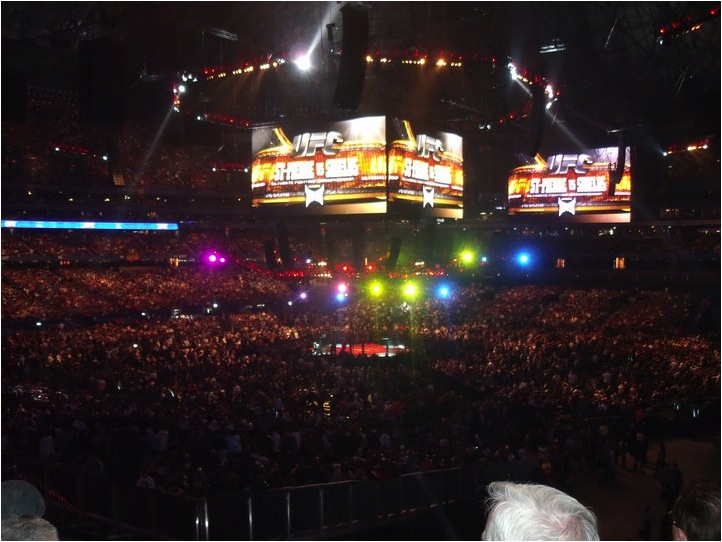
UFC 129 shattered previous North American gate and attendance records.

This momentum carried into the summer of 2010 at UFC 116, which featured the return of Brock Lesnar defending his UFC Heavyweight title against the undefeated interim-champion Shane Carwin before 1.25 million PPV viewers. Lesnar survived an early barrage of Carwin's punches in a contest that was nearly stopped by referee Josh Rosenthal. However, Lesnar recovered in the second round to submit Carwin via arm-triangle choke to retain the undisputed UFC Heavyweight Championship. The event as a whole was critically acclaimed in the media for living up to the hype with a number of exciting fights.

After a fifth round, last-minute victory by UFC Middleweight Champion Anderson Silva over Chael Sonnen at UFC 117, Lesnar finally surrendered his belt to the undefeated Cain Velasquez via 1st-round TKO at UFC 121. The fight produced Velasquez's eighth knockout or technical knockout in his first nine MMA fights.

UFC 129 featured Georges St-Pierre vs. Jake Shields at the Rogers Centre in Toronto, Ontario, Canada and is currently the largest UFC event in North American history, which coincided with a two-day UFC Fan Expo at the Direct Energy Centre. The event sold out 55,000 tickets for gate revenues exceeding $11 million, shattering previous MMA attendance and gate records in North America.

On November 5, 2016, the UFC had its first exhibition in New York City after years of being delayed by government officials and red tape with a dramatic first match, Conor McGregor vs. Eddie Alvarez.

==== WEC merger ====
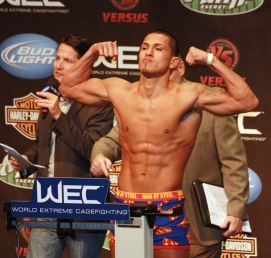
Anthony Pettis weighs in for the final WEC event.

Zuffa, the parent company of the UFC, purchased World Extreme Cagefighting in late 2006 and held the first WEC event under new ownership on January 20, 2007. Soon thereafter the WEC made its home on the Versus Network with its first event debuting on that network in June 2007.

On October 28, 2010, Zuffa announced that WEC would merge with the UFC. The WEC held its final card on December 16, 2010. As a result of the merger, the UFC absorbed WEC's bantamweight, featherweight and lightweight weight divisions and their respective fighters. The UFC also made the last WEC Featherweight and Bantamweight Champions, José Aldo and Dominick Cruz respectively, the inaugural UFC Champions of their new weight divisions.

Reed Harris, who started World Extreme Cagefighting with Scott Adams, had mixed emotions on the merger. "It's kind of like when your kid goes off to college: at first you're not happy, but after you think about it for a while, you're really happy," Harris said following the announcement. "At the end of the day, I never imagined this thing would be where we're at today. I'm extremely proud and happy that I was involved with something that will now be part of what may be, some day, the largest sports organization in the world."

==== Strikeforce purchase ====
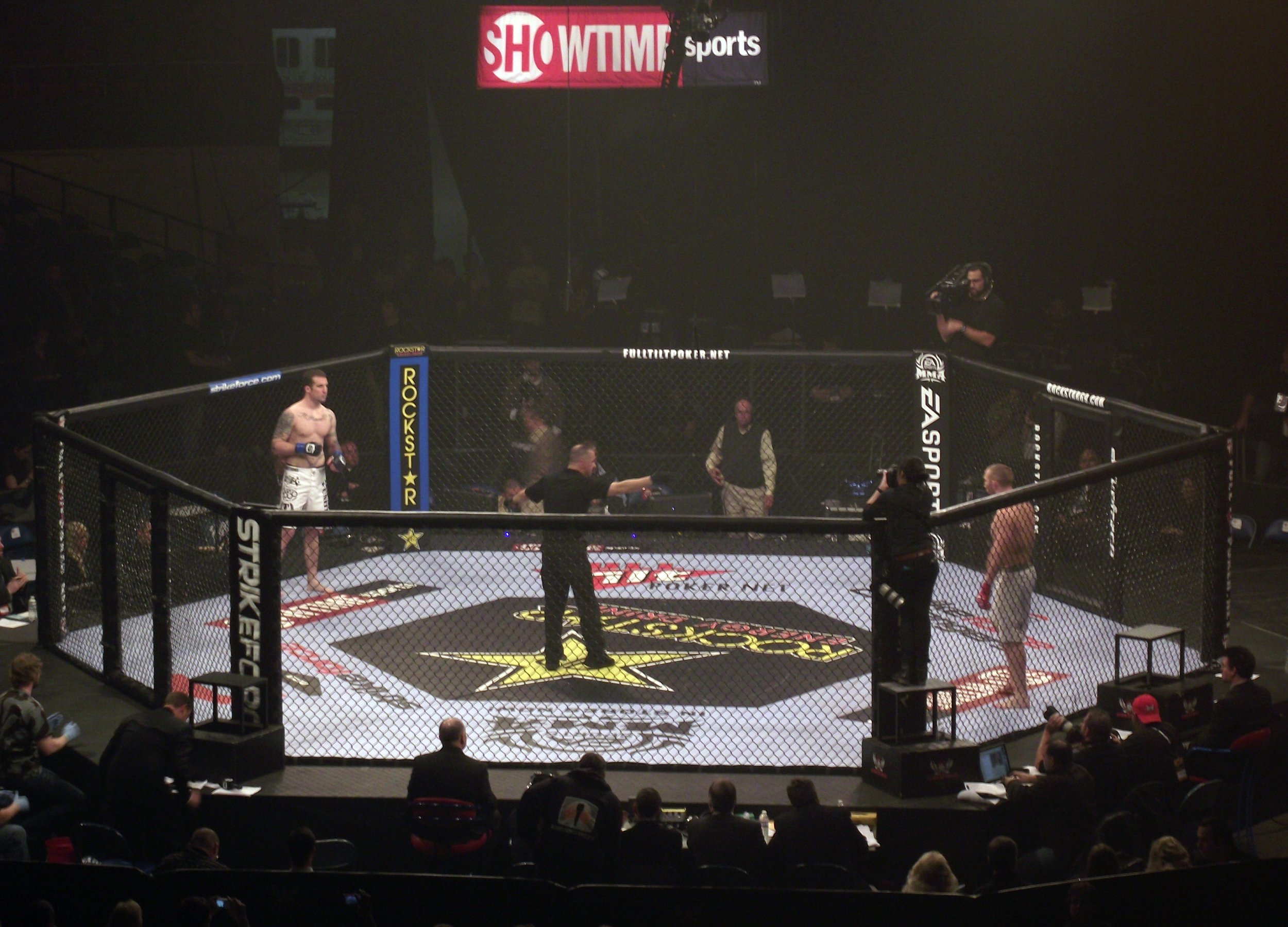
The Strikeforce cage

On March 12, 2011, Dana White announced that Zuffa had purchased Strikeforce. White said that Strikeforce will operate as an independent promotion, and that CEO Scott Coker will continue to run the promotion. Coker announced the return of Fedor Emelianenko on an unspecified July or August event and said that Zuffa-owned company would continue to co-promote with M-1 Global. After an extension was reached to continue Strikeforce through 2012, the promotion's heavyweight division (sans Heavyweight Grand Prix finalists) was merged into the UFC, and the promotion's Challengers series was ended.

The final Strikeforce show was Strikeforce: Marquardt vs. Saffiedine on January 12, 2013, after which the promotion was dissolved and all fighter contracts were either ended or absorbed into the UFC.

==== Fox partnership ====
UFC on Fox Nielsen ratings
Event	Date	Rating	Share	Viewers	Ref.
Velasquez vs. dos Santos	November 12, 2011	3.1	5	5.7 million	
Evans vs. Davis	January 28, 2012	2.6	5	4.7 million	
Diaz vs. Miller	May 5, 2012	1.5	3	2.4 million	
Shogun vs. Vera	August 4, 2012	1.4	3	2.4 million	
Henderson vs. Diaz	December 8, 2012	2.5	5	4.4 million	
Johnson vs. Dodson	January 26, 2013	2.4	5	4.2 million	
Henderson vs. Melendez	April 20, 2013	2.2	4	3.7 million	
Johnson vs. Moraga	July 27, 2013	1.5	3	2.4 million	
Johnson vs. Benavidez 2	December 14, 2013	1.8	3	2.8 million	
Henderson vs. Thomson	January 25, 2014	1.9	3	3.2 million	
Werdum vs. Browne	April 19, 2014	1.6	3	2.5 million	
Lawler vs. Brown	July 26, 2014	1.5	3	2.5 million	
dos Santos vs. Miocic	December 13, 2014	1.6	3	2.8 million	
Gustafsson vs. Johnson	January 24, 2015	1.8	4	3.0 million	

On August 18, 2011, The Ultimate Fighting Championship and Fox announced a seven-year broadcast deal through the Fox Sports subsidiary, effectively ending the UFC's Spike TV and Versus (now NBC Sports Network) partnership. The deal includes four events on the main Fox network, 32 live Friday night fights per year on their cable network FX, 24 events following The Ultimate Fighter reality show and six separate Fight Night events.

The promotion's first broadcast television event – UFC on Fox: Velasquez vs. dos Santos – broke form by showcasing only one fight to television viewers. In the main event, Junior dos Santos abruptly dethroned then-undefeated UFC heavyweight champion Cain Velasquez by knock-out at 1:04 in the first round. The telecast peaked with 8.8 million viewers tuning into the fight with an average audience of 5.7 million, making it by far the most-watched MMA event of all-time and the most-watched combat sports event since 2003's HBO bout between Lennox Lewis and Vitali Klitschko.

One of the other programming opportunities that emerged was a weekly UFC magazine-style show. When asked about potential for a weekly magazine-style series, UFC CEO Lorenzo Fertitta responded, "Not only weekly, but potentially, multiple times per week you'll have a UFC magazine (show)." The UFC maintained production control of its product including use of its broadcast team, Mike Goldberg and Joe Rogan. Fox Sports produced pre- and post-shows.

==== Women's MMA ====
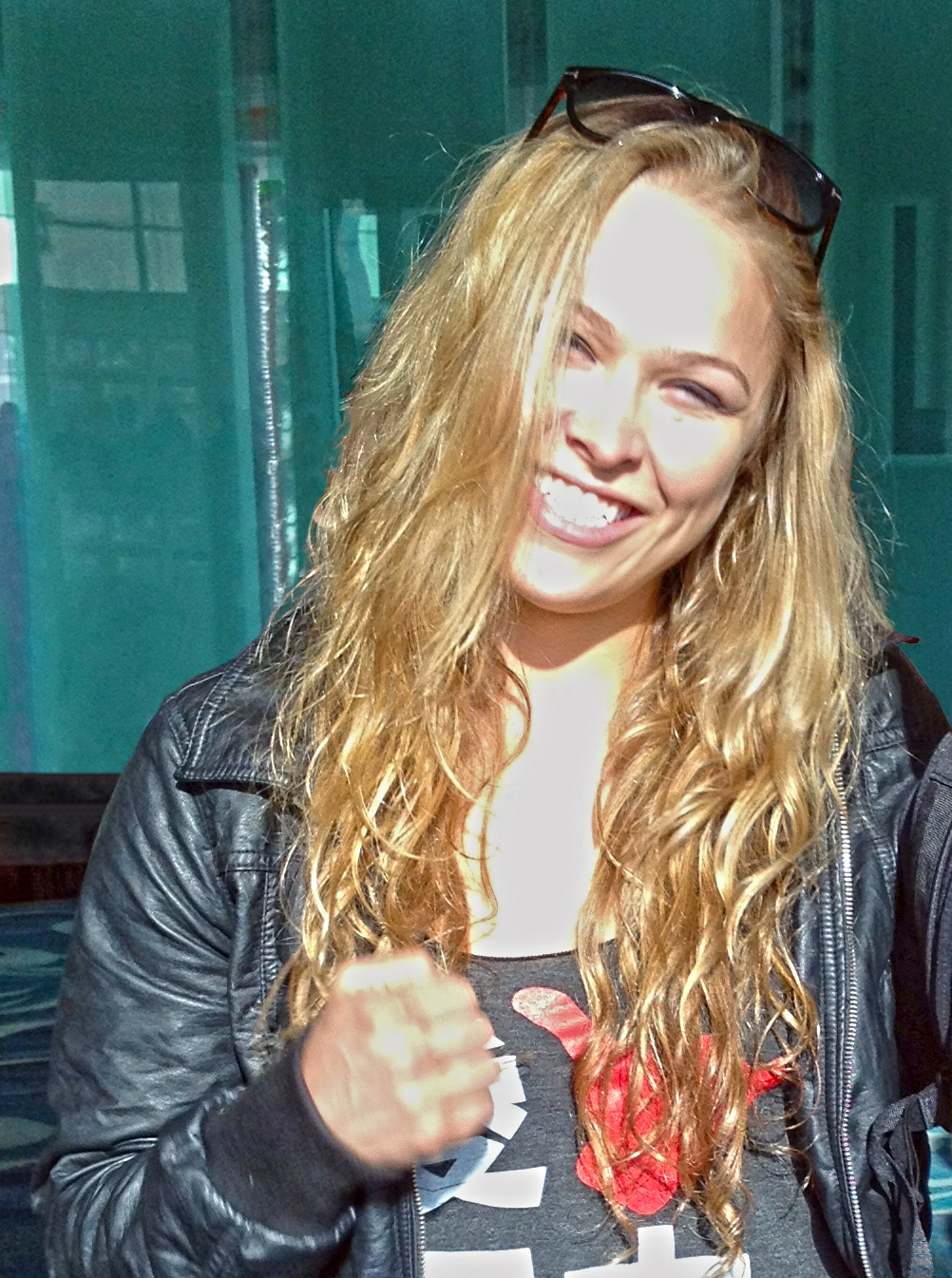
Ronda Rousey was the first female UFC champion. She defended her 135-pound Bantamweight Championship from February 23, 2013, to November 15, 2015.

On November 16, 2012, the eve of UFC 154: St. Pierre vs. Condit, Dana White confirmed the UFC would feature women's MMA with the signing of its first female fighter, Strikeforce bantamweight champion Ronda Rousey. She subsequently became the first female UFC champion, the first Olympic medalist with a UFC title, and the first woman to defend a UFC title. She would successfully defend her title six times.

On December 11, 2013, the UFC purchased the contracts of 11 female fighters from Invicta Fighting Championships to launch its 115-pound Strawweight division. Eight of the Invicta fighters took part in the 20th season of The Ultimate Fighter, The Ultimate Fighter: Team Pettis vs. Team Melendez, along with eight additional fighters signed up for the tournament via open tryouts. Season winner, Invicta FC's Strawweight Champion, Carla Esparza became the first UFC women's strawweight champion, defeating Rose Namajunas in the finale. Other fighters on the show included Felice Herrig, Tecia Torres, Joanne Calderwood, Bec Hyatt, Randa Markos, Jessica Penne, and Joanna Jędrzejczyk.

==== International expansion ====
The first UFC event to be held outside the contiguous United States was UFC 8 in Puerto Rico, a US territory, in 1996.

Canada has hosted events 18 times, starting with UFC 83 in 2008 and most recently in 2024 with UFC Fight Night 246. UFC's second biggest event to date was also in Canada, as UFC 129 held at Rogers Centre featured a record-breaking attendance of 55,724.

The United Kingdom has been home to 18 events. The first was UFC 38 held in London in 2002. UFC returned to the United Kingdom in 2007 with UFC 70, and visited Northern Ireland for UFC 72. The UK's most recent event was in Manchester, England with UFC 304 in 2024. Ireland has held UFC 93 in 2009 and UFC Fight Night: McGregor vs. Brandao 5 years later. In continental Europe, Germany has hosted 6 times, the first being UFC 99 in 2009, UFC 122 in 2010, UFC Fight Night: Munoz vs. Mousasi in 2014, UFC Fight Night: Jędrzejczyk vs. Penne in 2015, UFC Fight Night: Arlovski vs. Barnett in 2016, and most recently, UFC Fight Night: Shogun vs. Smith in 2018. Sweden has hosted 3 times, starting with UFC on Fuel TV: Gustafsson vs. Silva in 2012, and recently with UFC on Fox: Gustafsson vs. Johnson in 2015. Poland had its first event with UFC Fight Night: Gonzaga vs. Cro Cop 2 in 2015.

The first Brazilian event was UFC Brazil: Ultimate Brazil, held in São Paulo in 1998. The promotion did not return to Brazil until 2011 for UFC 134, but since then, the country has hosted a further 20 events. Its most recent visit was UFC Fight Night: Condit vs. Alves. In 2014, Mexico became the second country in Latin America to host an event with UFC 180, followed by a second event, UFC 188, in 2015.

Seven UFC events have been held in Australia, beginning with UFC 110 in 2010 and most recently in December 2018 with UFC Fight Night 142. New Zealand held its first event in 2014, UFC Fight Night: Te Huna vs. Marquardt. Its most recent event was UFC Fight Night: Felder vs. Hooker in February 2020.

In Asia, the UFC has visited 5 countries. Japan had its first visit in 1997 for UFC Japan: Ultimate Japan. The UFC only returned to the country in 2012, with UFC 144. its last visit was in 2014 for UFC Fight Night: Hunt vs. Nelson, the seventh event there. The promotion has also featured 3 visits to the United Arab Emirates. The first was in 2010 for UFC 112 the second in 2014 for UFC Fight Night: Nogueira vs. Nelson and the third in 2024 for UFC on ABC: Sandhagen vs. Nurmagomedov. The promotion has also visited Macau in 3 occasions: China's special administrative region was first visited in 2012 with UFC on Fuel TV: Franklin vs. Le and last visited in 2014 for UFC Fight Night: Bisping vs. Le. The promotion has also visited Singapore with UFC Fight Night: Saffiedine vs. Lim in 2014. The Philippines was the most recent Asian country that the UFC has visited, with UFC Fight Night: Edgar vs. Faber in 2015.

The Ultimate Fighter has had international editions as well: Brazil (since 2012), Australia (vs. United Kingdom – 2012), China (2013), Canada (vs. Australia – 2014), and Latin America (2014).

==== TRT ban ====
On February 27, 2014, the Nevada State Athletic Commission banned the use of Testosterone Replacement Therapy (TRT). The UFC followed suit and banned the use of TRT for any of its events, including international markets where the UFC oversees regulatory efforts.

==== Lawsuits over contractual treatment of fighters ====
===== Class action: Le v. Zuffa anti-trust lawsuit =====
In December 2014, an antitrust lawsuit was filed against Zuffa by several fighters, claiming the organization restricts control over fighters' careers and earning potential. The case moved to Nevada federal court, where Zuffa was denied its motion to stay discovery for 15 years of its financial records.

This caused an ongoing debate and struggle over how UFC sensitive information should be handled, and who may view it. Especially concerning MMAFA founder, Rob Maysey who has taken the lead in representing the former athletes and has stated he hopes to achieve reforms similar to the Ali Act (2000).

Later that year, a 12–16 month investigation began that was expected to last until sometime between September 2016 to January 2017. Thus far, both sides have provided over 100,000 documents.

It is estimated that the UFC shares between 16% and 22% of its revenue with fighters, which is vastly lower than sports leagues such as the NBA, MLB, and NHL, which share approximately half of the revenue with their athletes.

There have been several ongoing lawsuits over the contractual treatment of UFC fighters. One of the most recent cases was filed in 2020 by a group of fighters led by Cung Le and Nate Quarry. They alleged that the UFC violated antitrust laws by engaging in anti-competitive practices that kept fighter pay artificially low. The plaintiffs argued that the UFC's practice of using long-term exclusive contracts and "champion's clauses" (which extend a fighter's contract automatically if they win a title) was intended to suppress fighter pay and prevent them from negotiating with other promotions. They also claimed that the UFC engaged in various other anti-competitive practices, such as blocking fighters from using their own image and likeness rights and taking a significant portion of revenue from merchandise sales. The case was initially dismissed by a judge in 2020, but the fighters appealed the decision and in 2021 the appeals court revived the lawsuit and sent it back to the lower court for further proceedings. On October 1, 2023, Zuffa's appeal to the Ninth Circuit court in its antitrust lawsuit has been denied.

On August 9, 2023, U.S. District Judge Richard Boulware granted class action status to more than 1,200 former UFC fighters who competed between December 2010 and June 2017 and are suing for $800 million upward to $1.6 billion in wages, as the lawsuit claims Zuffa had abused its power to suppress UFC fighters' wages. The anti-trust law also permits private plaintiffs to be able to recover three times the damages suffered, meaning the UFC may ultimately pay several billions of dollars' worth of damages. The case has a scheduled April 8, 2024 trial date. On March 20, 2024, TKO, UFC parent company reached an agreement to settle all claims in the class action lawsuits for $335 million where the settlement amount will be deductible for tax purposes. However, on July 31, 2024, Judge Richard Boulware ruled that the case would be heard by a jury and denied the preliminary approval for a settlement and reset a tentative date for trial of October 28.

====== Smith v. UFC ======
Other lawsuits have also been filed against the UFC, including one by former fighter Leslie Smith, who claimed that the UFC violated federal labor laws by classifying fighters as independent contractors instead of employees. The case was dismissed in 2019, but Smith has appealed the decision.

=== 2016 sale to WME-IMG and a new era ===
In May 2016, ESPN originally reported that the UFC's parent company Zuffa, LLC was in talks to sell the company for $3.5 billion to $4 billion. In 2015, the UFC had a reported EBITDA of $200–250 million. No official comment was made from the UFC or Dana White regarding the sale. Companies initially interested in the sale were Dalian Wanda Group, China Media Capital, and WME–IMG (Endeavor).

On July 9, 2016, it was officially announced that the UFC would be sold to a group led by WME–IMG, its owner Silver Lake Partners, Kohlberg Kravis Roberts, and MSD Capital, for $4.025 billion. At the time, it marked the largest-ever acquisition in sports. Flash Entertainment (owned by the government of Abu Dhabi) retained its 10% minority stake in the company. White, who owned 9% of the UFC, stayed, having been given a stake in the new business. White remained president. Fertitta stepped down as chairman and CEO. WME–IMG was renamed Endeavor in September 2017. Three years into the Endeavor era, White revealed that an undisclosed company bid $5 billion but the Fertittas chose WME–IMG due to a connection they already made with its CEO Ari Emanuel.

In October 2016, MMAJunkie obtained a UFC financial report released by Endeavor, detailing that the promotion had reached a year-to-year high of $609 million in revenue during 2015. 76% of the total was credited to "content" revenue, covering media rights, PPV buys and UFC Fight Pass subscriptions; in turn, 42% of content revenue was credited to pay-per-view buys, followed by U.S. and international media rights.

==== ESPN partnership ====
In May 2018, UFC reached new U.S. media rights deals with Disney Direct-to-Consumer and International and ESPN Inc., succeeding those with 21st Century Fox, which began in January 2019. The five-year contracts were cumulatively valued at $300 million per-year for digital and linear rights, roughly doubling the amount paid by Fox in the final year of its previous contract, and included 42 events on ESPN platforms per-year. ESPN linear networks televised preliminary cards for UFC PPV events, and 10 UFC on ESPN Fight Night events per-year. The subscription streaming service ESPN+ broadcast 20 exclusive events per-year under the branding UFC on ESPN+ Fight Night; regardless of network, all Fight Night events featured a full, 12-fight card, and their preliminaries aired exclusively on ESPN+. The ESPN+ service also held on-demand rights to UFC library and archive content, new seasons of Dana White's Contender Series, and other new original content. UFC Fight Pass was purchasable as an add-on for ESPN+ to stream pay-per-view events.

On March 18, 2019, it was announced that ESPN had reached a two-year extension of the contract. In addition, future UFC PPVs were only sold through ESPN+ to its subscribers, and were no longer be sold via traditional television providers beginning with UFC 236. At the same time, the standard price for UFC PPVs was lowered to $59.99 (from $64.99), and new subscribers were able to purchase a bundle of UFC PPV for a year of ESPN+ too.

==== M-1 Global partnership ====
On July 18, 2018, it was announced that UFC had entered into a partnership with Russian MMA promoter M-1 Global. M-1 Global will serve as a farm league to scout Russian fighters for UFC and will participate in organizing UFC events in Russia. The deal also gave M-1 champions the opportunity to sign with UFC.

==== Impact of the COVID-19 pandemic ====
Due to the COVID-19 pandemic, the UFC went on with its March 13, 2020 event, UFC Fight Night: Lee vs. Oliveira in Brasília, Brazil, behind closed doors. On March 16, the organization announced that the next three events, UFC Fight Night: Woodley vs. Edwards, UFC on ESPN: Ngannou vs. Rozenstruik, and UFC Fight Night: Overeem vs. Harris, would be postponed to future dates.

In regards to its next pay-per-view, UFC 249 on April 18, UFC president Dana White stated that the event would likely go on, but at a new venue behind closed doors. It was originally to be held at Barclays Center, but a stay-at-home order was issued by the New York state government. On March 18, the New York State Athletic Commission also withdrew its sanctioning for the event. Due to international travel restrictions and other withdrawals, a revised card for UFC 249 was unveiled on April 6 with a location still TBD. The next day, White disclosed that he had booked an unspecified venue for two months, in order to host both UFC 249 and other future events involving U.S. fighters. He also disclosed plans to secure a private island, known as "Fight Island", to host events with international fighters.

The new UFC 249 venue was subsequently revealed to be Tachi Palace—a tribal casino in Lemoore, California; as it is on tribal land, it also fell outside of the jurisdiction of the California State Athletic Commission, meaning that events held there could be self-sanctioned. On April 9, the UFC announced that UFC 249 had been cancelled, and all other UFC events would be suspended until further notice. White cited interventions from high-ranking staff of the UFC's U.S. media rightsholders, ESPN Inc. and parent The Walt Disney Company, as well as Governor Newsom. The New York Post reported that Governor of California Gavin Newsom had contacted Disney chairman and former CEO Bob Iger, urging ESPN and the UFC to not hold the event.

Following the decree that professional sports were deemed as "essential services" in Florida, UFC 249 took place on May 9, 2020, at VyStar Veterans Memorial Arena in Jacksonville, Florida with no fans in attendance. Precautionary health and safety measures proposed by the UFC satisfied the Florida State Boxing Commission, which regulates MMA in the state. UFC Fight Night: Smith vs. Teixeira and UFC on ESPN: Overeem vs. Harris were scheduled to take place at the same venue on May 13 and 16, respectively. On Friday, May 8, the UFC announced middleweight fighter Ronaldo Souza was removed from his bout with Uriah Hall at UFC 249 and quarantined after he tested positive for COVID-19, along with his cornermen, despite following the protocols enforced by the UFC. No other athletes or staff tested positive for the disease.

In April 2021, amid the COVID-19 pandemic, the UFC held its UFC 261 event, again at the VyStar Arena in Jacksonville, but with a 100-% sold-out capacity, where attendees were not required to wear masks. Public health experts criticized the event, citing the risks to attendees, as well as to the wider community.

==== Controversy over eye pokes ====
In March 2021, there was strong pressure on the UFC to use new fighter gloves after a severe eye poke ended the final bout at UFC Fight Night: Edwards vs. Muhammad. The official UFC gloves are constructed in a way that leaves the fighters fingers extended forward, whereas there are alternative gloves, which the UFC has not used, which are curved at the knuckle and keep a fighter's fingers tucked down. Fighters, trainers and commentators called for new gloves, citing the harms posed to fighters from the standard UFC gloves.

==== Zuffa buyout by Endeavor ====
On April 29, 2021, Endeavor successfully launched an initial public offering (IPO) and became a publicly traded company listed on the New York Stock Exchange. Endeavor subsequently used some of the proceeds from the IPO to buy out Zuffa's other shareholders at a value of $1.7 billion, making Zuffa a wholly owned subsidiary of Endeavor.

==== Betting scandal ====
On November 5, 2022, controversy arose when the call for a sports betting fraud investigation was made on a fight involving Darrick Minner a student of James Krause, who is a UFC coach and avid bettor, and Shayilan Nuerdanbieke at UFC Fight Night: Rodriguez vs. Lemos. The UFC was informed by sources that suspicious betting patterns had been observed on the fight. Minner became a large betting underdog just hours before the fight, and the cause of the suspicion came when Minner threw a kick with an apparently injured leg, then kicked with it again after showing signs of injury before being finished by technical knockout shortly thereafter.

On November 6, the UFC released a statement that its official betting partner would look into the matter, but that none of the fighters, coaches, or officials related to the fight were suspected of any wrongdoing. On November 18, the Nevada State Athletic Commission informed the UFC and Krause that Krause's license was suspended and would remain so during the course of the investigation. The UFC then announced that any fighter who chose to continue to be coached by Krause or who continued to train in his gym, would not be permitted to participate in UFC events pending the outcome of the aforementioned government investigations.

Following the controversy, UFC introduced rules that banned athletes, coaches, and their close family from betting on UFC events.

=== TKO era ===
==== Endeavor and WWE merger to form TKO ====
On September 12, 2023, Endeavor merged with professional wrestling promotion WWE to form a new publicly traded company under the stock symbol "TKO", overseen by Endeavor's CEO Ari Emanuel. WWE's shareholders held a 49% stake in the new company, with Vince McMahon serving as an executive chairman before resigning on January 26, 2024, after Janel Grant, a former WWE employee, filed a lawsuit against McMahon for sex trafficking and sexual assault; the merger agreement valued UFC at $12.1 billion. White continued to serve as the CEO for UFC, with his role remaining the same as during the Endeavor period.

On June 6, 2025, the UFC and TKO announced the creation of UFC Brazilian Jiu-Jitsu (UFC BJJ), a sister submission grappling promotion company described by the UFC as "the world's new premier Brazilian Jiu-Jitsu live event series". The promotion held its inaugural event, UFC BJJ 1: Musumeci vs. Gabriel, on June 25, 2025, as part of UFC 317 International Fight Week. During the build-up to UFC BJJ 1, the UFC BJJ: Road to the Title reality web television series aired daily on YouTube.

==== Paramount partnership ====
On August 11, 2025, UFC announced a seven-year, $7.7 billion media rights agreement with Paramount Skydance; the agreement will see all UFC events stream exclusively on Paramount+ in the United States, including 13 numbered events and 30 UFC Fight Night cards per-year. Under the agreement, UFC will move away from the pay-per-view model for numbered events: they will stream at no additional charge to Paramount+ subscribers, and it was stated that "selected" numbered events would also be carried by the CBS broadcast network. TKO Group CEO Mark Shapiro described the PPV model as "outdated"; while the exact number of events on broadcast television has not been determined, Shapiro did not rule out that all numbered events could be aired by CBS. Contrarily, White did not rule out "one-off" PPV events in a hypothetical scenario. The contract is one of the first major new rights agreements reached by the company since its acquisition by Skydance Media. On October 28, 2025, UFC and Paramount Skydance announced that all UFC events would also stream exclusively on Paramount+ in Latin America, while Australia would exclusively get all UFC Fight Nights and preliminary matches for the numbered events on their version of the service, as the main card rights are held by Foxtel.

== Facilities ==
=== UFC Apex ===
The UFC Apex is a live events and production facility. The facility was officially opened on June 18, 2019. In the wake of the COVID-19 pandemic, several UFC events (including UFC 250) were held at Apex behind closed doors. The Octagon at the Apex is notable for being smaller than the Octagon used at all other UFC events, with 25-foot width rather than the usual 30-feet.

=== UFC Performance Institute ===
The UFC Performance Institute is the official mixed martial arts school for UFC. The building is located in Las Vegas, Nevada opposite the UFC Apex. The institute was opened in 2017, and is the world's first mixed martial arts center for innovation, research and training. As many as 400 MMA athletes have visited the center, as well as NFL, NBA, NHL and MLB athletes.

In June 2019, a second facility was opened in Shanghai, China. In 2021, UFC was named the official "high performance advisor" of the Chinese Olympic Committee (COC), under which the Performance Institute in Shanghai would be designated as an official high performance training facility of the COC, and would offer access to its resources for Chinese athletes training to compete in the Olympic Games.

In February 2024, the third Performance Institute was opened in Mexico City, Mexico.

== Drug policy efforts ==
During the early years of mixed martial arts, when Pride Fighting Championships along with the Ultimate Fighting Championship were early premierships of the sport, it has been documented that there was a noteworthy lack of rules and regulations regarding drug testing for performance-enhancing drugs. This led to a widespread debate and discussion regarding how prevalent the use of steroids were in the sport, as well as a long list of competitors in the UFC and other major organizations facing failed drug tests. This was further highlighted by continued problems with UFC champions, including Jon Jones and Anderson Silva, failing drug tests. So in February 2015, UFC announced a more aggressive year round, random-testing approach for its competitors to begin in July 2015.

=== USADA anti-doping partnership (2015–2024) ===
UFC announced a partnership with United States Anti-Doping Agency (USADA) on June 3, 2015, as the UFC's official, independent anti-doping agency. The UFC USADA testing program became effective on July 1, 2015, and includes a minimum of 2,750 drug tests per year with an average of five tests per fighter, and punishments for fighters who fail the tests. Under the UFC Anti-Doping Policy, fighters are subject to random tests at any time and place on all in- and out-of-competition blood and urine samples collected by USADA. Fighters must participate in the testing pool for at least six months prior to a fight in order to qualify for a UFC event. In February 2017, UFC made changes to the anti-doping policy, effective April 1, 2017, as follows: (1) Fighters who are new to the UFC with no previous contract would be subject to a one-month testing rule. The same rule applies to returning fighters who were terminated or whose contracts were not renewed at the decision of the UFC. Previously, returning or terminated fighters were required to undergo four months of testings prior to competing in a fight. (2) Returning fighters who have chosen to retire, go on hiatus, or had a non-renewal of their contract, are required to be in a six-month testing pool prior to competition. (3) No doping violation is handed down to newly signed UFC fighters who voluntarily disclose the use of a prohibited substance prior to testing. (4) "In-competition" testing begins at noon on the weigh-in day and ends one hour after a fighter clears a post-fight medical for non-selected post-fight testing. For fighters who are subjected to post-fight testing the in-competition testing ends after any post-fight testing is done.

In September 2018, it was indicated no announcements would be made on fighters who have been flagged for a potential doping violation until the entire adjudication processes are conducted with the results of the potential doping violation. This came after several cases of fighters, such as Anderson Silva, Junior dos Santos, Josh Barnett and Cris Cyborg, being flagged for potential doping violations, but cleared after they were proved of unintentional use of performance enhancing drugs (usually in the form of contaminated supplements). On November 25, 2019, news surfaced that the UFC and USADA had revised their policies, providing a list of certified supplements that will not lead to sanctions should contaminated samples occur. In January 2021, USADA announced that marijuana would no longer be included in the list of banned substances and they would not penalize any fighter for testing positive for it either before, during, or after a fight. The only exception would be if a fighter was visibly impaired on fight night. Fighters are subject to be suspended up to four years depending on the banned substance used. The common banned substances detected by USADA from suspended fighters are 7-keto-DHEA for weight loss, Anastrozole for estrogen blocker, Clenbuterol for thinning blood to increase oxygen, EPO for stimulating the production of red blood cells which would increase oxygen to muscles, Higenamine for increase heart contraction and speeding up heart rate, Tamoxifen for estrogen blocker, Furosemide, Hydrochlorothiazide for diuretic agent to mask potential doping evidence, Meldonium for stimulating the production of red blood cells which would increase oxygen to muscles, Cocaine, Fentanyl for substances of abuse, Boldenone, Turinabol- (steroid for horses), Drostanolone, hGH, Ibutamoren, Ipamorelin, LGD-4033, Metandienone, Ostarine, Stanozolol, Trenbolone for increased muscle mass and strength, Androstenedione, Androsta, Clomiphene, Dehydrochloromethyltestosterone, and Testosterone for increased testosterone.

In 2015, USADA conducted 353 tests and 2291 tests in 2016 on 586 UFC fighters with Anderson Silva tested the most of a total of 15 times. In 2017 and 2018 a total of 2818 and 2888 tests were conducted by USADA respectively.

As of May 16, 2019, a total of 76 UFC fighters had been sanctioned by USADA since the UFC USADA testing program started.

On October 11, 2023, USADA announced that its partnership with the UFC would end on January 1, 2024.

=== Drug Free Sport International anti-doping partnership (2024–present) ===
With the UFC's partnership with USADA coming to an end in 2023, the UFC announced a new partnership with Drug Free Sport International, the same company that oversees the anti-doping programs of the NCAA, MLB, NFL, and NBA. The administration of the UFC Anti-Doping Program, including sanctioning decisions, will be handled exclusively and independently by Combat Sports Anti-Doping (CSAD), where the former FBI agent George Piro would serve as the independent administrator of the UFC's anti-doping program. This partnership began in 2024, after their contract with USADA expired on December 31, 2023. The UFC announced that former FBI agent George Piro would serve as the independent administrator of the UFC's anti-doping program.

== Anti-piracy efforts ==
UFC has been one of the largest and most aggressive spenders among anti-piracy political lobbyists in the United States since the end of the 2000s. One thing in particular that sets them apart from other sports leagues is that, in addition to supporting efforts of stricter piracy laws, they have also on numerous occasions gone after selected individuals in addition to pirate hosting websites. Some of the most notable cases have included, a well publicized lawsuit with Justin.tv in 2011 and a $32 million settlement involving a New York man in 2014.

UFC has always maintained the stance that the large amounts of illegal streams of their events causes massive financial losses. In response to having such a stringent stance it has been extremely controversial and has caused a number of debates within the mixed martial arts community on its effectiveness. As a result, the UFC began experimenting on an online subscription model known as UFC Fight Pass in 2014. It is unclear how beneficial the service has been since its emphasis has been largely minimal next to UFC's partnership with Fox and noticeable decline in average PPV buyrates, highlighted by the S&P downgrading Zuffa's credit rating in late 2014.

== Insurance policy ==
On May 9, 2011, it was announced that UFC would be providing year-round customized insurance coverage for any injury suffered by Strikeforce and UFC independent contractor athletes. The policy covers any injuries that occur during competition, training, and non-training related accidents. The policy was underwritten by Houston-based specialty insurance group HCC Insurance Holdings and went into effect on June 1, 2011.

The details of the policy include:

- Coverage for all athletes signed by the UFC or Strikeforce.
- Coverage for athletes residing both within and outside of the United States.
- Zuffa paying for all premiums for the policy, with athletes not required to pay anything.
- Allowing athletes to use up to $50,000 in annual coverage for any injuries that occur while under contract to Zuffa. This includes services such as, doctor services, laboratory tests, emergency medical evacuation, and physical therapy.
- Coverage for athletes regardless of if they are scheduled to compete.
- Life and dental insurance at no cost to the athletes.
- No coverage for minor illnesses, but training-related illnesses like staph infections are covered.

An insurance policy is not a first for mixed martial arts or combat sports as a whole. Former promotions such as the International Fight League, offered insurance to its athletes. However Zuffa's policy is the first to cover a large group of combat sport athletes. According to UFC president Dana White, the policy was a goal of the company since Zuffa first purchased the UFC in 2001. In addition UFC chairman and CEO, Lorenzo Fertitta stated that the policy took three years to establish while trying to find possible insurers. Prior to the introduction of this policy, Zuffa provided up to $100,000 for an athlete on each event to cover injuries sustained during competition. However, if an athlete was injured outside of competition they would have to pay for their own medical expenses.

Notable incidents where UFC athletes were injured outside of competition include,

- Frank Mir, who was struck by a car while riding his motorcycle in 2004, and forced out of competition for over 20 months.
- Brock Lesnar, who was forced out of action for several months while struggling with diverticulitis.

== Impact on MMA regulations ==
The current rules used in the UFC were first established by the New Jersey Athletic Control Board in 2000, in consultation with the UFC and other MMA promotions in the United States. The first UFC event under the new rules was UFC 28, held before Zuffa's takeover. New Jersey's Unified Rules of Mixed Martial Arts has since been established throughout the country by other state athletic commissions, including Nevada and California. The UFC has, however, kept close ties with state commissions, especially the Nevada State Athletic Commission, of which Lorenzo Fertitta is a former board member.

== Legal disputes and monopoly accusations ==
=== Federal Trade Commission investigation ===
In the months following the March 2011 acquisition of rival promotion Strikeforce, rumours began to circulate that a possible investigation by the FTC would take place. These rumours later came to be true when it was officially announced around the end of January 2012 that the FTC had in fact conducted an investigation, and found no wrongdoings regarding the UFC being a monopoly.

=== Class action lawsuits ===
==== 2014 ====
On December 16, 2014, a class action lawsuit was filed against UFC by fighters Cung Le, Jon Fitch and Nate Quarry. Within a few days, Javier Vazquez and Dennis Hallman filed a second class action. And on December 24, Brandon Vera and Pablo Garza filed a third lawsuit. Shortly after the initial news spreading, UFC quickly responded following the first class action with the statement that, "The UFC will vigorously defend itself and its business practices." This soon led other promoters such as Scott Coker, President of Bellator MMA, expressing an interest in the outcome of the lawsuit, while rejecting his organization as being labeled a "minor league" as was done several times in the initial filing. By the end of December 2014, the UFC made a formal statement stating, "We are proud of the company we have built, confident in our legal position, and intend to prevail in this lawsuit."

==== 2015 ====
On February 7, 2015, a fourth lawsuit was filed against the UFC, this one by Mac Danzig and Gabe Ruediger. It was around this time that UFC motioned to move the hearing date from May 7 to March 26, as well as to move the venue from Northern California to Las Vegas, where they are headquartered. A few weeks later, UFC motioned to have the lawsuits dismissed, in four separate documents they claim, "The Complaints' vague and conclusory allegations fall far short of the Supreme Court's requirements in Bell Atlantic Corp. v. Twombly, for pleading specific facts showing a plausible antitrust claim."

Shortly thereafter, a fifth lawsuit was added by Kyle Kingsbury and Darren Uyenoyama on March 20, 2015. On April 12, the plaintiff athletes filed an opposition to February's motion to dismiss and transfer. Following the May 7 hearing regarding the motion to change venue, a Californian federal judge granted UFC the motion to change venue to Las Vegas after citing contract agreements from the former employees. As a result of the change of venue to Nevada, UFC was denied its motion to remain a discovery for 15 years of its financial records. This would prompt a debate, especially by MMAFA founder Rob Maysey, on who should have access to the UFC's sensitive information and how that information should be viewed.

Both sides have argued for different criteria, so as not to put them at a disadvantage. However, UFC has requested a two-tiered system of confidentiality: confidential and highly confidential. They have stated they feel that Maysey's access to highly confidential information could have an influential impact on him and his role in the MMAFA. Meanwhile, Maysey has openly stated his goal is to represent the fighters and ultimately try to get a reform similar to the Ali Act of 2000.

Moving forward to September 25, 2015, due to the gradual nature and complications regarding the lawsuit; UFC requested another dismissal of the case and asked that it be thrown out of Las Vegas federal court. In a surprise bench ruling, this was ultimately denied, which promoted the UFC to release a formal response. The following week, magistrate judge Peggy Leen ruled that the UFC could not prevent plaintiffs attorney Rob Maysey from viewing its most highly confidential and sensitive business and financial information. This has officially caused an expert discovery that is estimated to last from 12 to 16 months (September 2016 to January 2017). In doing so, both parties will have to hand over various highly confidential and sensitive documents.

The goal of the expert discovery is to determine three key factors for antitrust liability to all hold true: (1) Does the UFC have monopoly power? (2) Did the UFC acquire or maintain such power through exclusionary conduct? (3) Did the UFC cause antitrust injury since having a monopoly is not always illegal in the United States? This is expected to involve a wide range of important figures (past and present) in both mixed martial arts and boxing, including most top ranked UFC staff, Scott Coker, Bjorn Rebney, Ray Sefo, Frank Shamrock, Fedor Emelianenko, Randy Couture, Ben Askren, Mark Cuban, Oscar De La Hoya, Bob Arum, Lou DiBella, Bob Meyrowitz, Ken Hershman and even various PRIDE FC executives. Following this ruling through the end of 2015, both sides have provided well over 100,000 documents.

==== 2016 ====
Starting in January, the UFC defense team filed its official answer, denying the fighters' antitrust claims. In an amended complaint, which contained nearly identical legal and economic substance to the original version from December 2014. The only major difference being the number of plaintiff fighters has declined from eleven to six. Pablo Garza, Gabe Ruediger, Darren Uyenoyama, Dennis Hallman, and Mac Danzig all dropped out of the lawsuit while the original three plaintiffs, Cung Le, Nate Quarry, and Jon Fitch, remain along with Brandon Vera, Javier Vazquez, and Kyle Kingsbury. In addition, UFC has stood by its point of protecting its brand. Additionally, the UFC inadvertently produced PRIDE FC acquisition materials.

Following this in October, UFC made a motion to dismiss the consolidated complaint, which was ultimately denied.

==== 2017 and 2018 ====
By this point of the lawsuit, there was considerably less notable coverage of the case. Aside from the occasional legal filings, the first of which being in February 2018 in which the plaintiffs filed a motion for class certification which faced opposition from UFC. Furthered in September, when the plaintiffs filed their opposition to UFC's motion for summary judgment.

Before finally on December 5, 2018, when the plaintiffs held an informational session to cover the status of the lawsuit in Las Vegas, Nevada.

All of which led to some major breaking news in regards to financial information about UFC being revealed once hearings started taking place in August and September. At this point the case included 12 plaintiffs attorneys, two from Bellator MMA, and two from Top Rank. As they intend to look into the business practices used by UFC throughout the years towards other MMA promotions throughout the 2000s. Who often have placed some level of blame of their demise on UFC.

Some of the most notable revelations included:

- The WME–IMG purchase for the UFC in 2016 was for $4 billion. As was speculated at the time of purchase.
- Athlete compensation ranged from 18.6% to 20.5% during 2011 to 2013. Compared to Strikeforce's wage share being around 63% and Bellator's around 44.7%. In addition, evidence was provided that showed that UFC made it part of its business strategy to keep athlete compensation below 25%.
- Yearly revenue, PPV, and other financial figures for most of the time UFC owned the company.
- Detailed accounts of negotiation tactics used on particular athletes.
- UFC paid former Pride Fighting Championships CEO Nobuyuki Sakakibara $10 million for a 7-year non-compete clause.

The Ultimate Fighting Championship has been accused of monopolistic business practices both in casual criticism and in formal lawsuits for a number of years. There are numerous fighters who have accused the company of various wrongdoing's regarding issues including unequal pay, predatory actions toward rival promotions, lack of a pension or union safety net, and other perceived unethical business practices. These perceptions have been most highlighted by a Federal Trade Commission investigation that took place between 2011 and 2012. As well as in a series of class action lawsuits filed against the company in late 2014 and early 2015.

==== 2024 ====
In July 2024, the parties in the Le v Zuffa and Johnson vs. Zuffa lawsuits had a proposed $335 million settlement rejected by Judge Richard Franklin Boulware II of the United States District Court for the District of Nevada. Subsequently, in September 2024, a new $375 million settlement was proposed.

On February 6, 2025, Judge Richard Boulware of Nevada granted final approval for a $375 million settlement in the "Le vs. Zuffa" antitrust lawsuit for monopolistic practices. As part of the settlement, around $240 million to $260 million will be distributed to eligible fighters, specifically those who competed in at least one UFC bout from December 2010 to June 2017. These payments are expected to be made over the next year. Additionally, $40 million from the settlement will be set aside for administrative and legal expenses. A second, related antitrust lawsuit, "Johnson vs. Zuffa", which covers fighters who competed in the UFC from 2017 to the present, remains unresolved and continues to proceed separately.

==== 2025 ====
In May 2025, two antitrust lawsuits were filed against the UFC. One, led by former fighter Misha Cirkunov, specifically challenged the enforceability of arbitration clauses and class action waivers in UFC contracts. The other lawsuit, filed by former fighter Phil Davis, alleges that the UFC's anticompetitive practices also negatively impacted the ability of non-UFC fighters to secure fair wages.

== Relationships with combat sports organizations ==
=== International Fight League ===
Throughout the existence of the International Fight League (IFL) between 2006 and 2008, both UFC and the IFL had competed in a hostile relationship. UFC accused the IFL and sued them for illegally using proprietary information obtained by hiring executives from their organization. The IFL responded with their own suit claiming that UFC was threatening potential partners not to work with the IFL, including Fox Sports Net (a deal with Fox Sports was later signed before resolution of the suit). The tension between the IFL and the UFC worsened with accusations that the IFL had attempted to buy out several top UFC fighters.

In July 2008, there were reports of the IFL's possible purchase by the UFC. That same month, Joe Favorito, former IFL senior vice president, cited financial troubles for the closing of the company on July 31, 2008. Anonymous sources stated that UFC had bought the IFL. Other reports cited the UFC's airing of IFL footage on its programming, and the signing of previous IFL fighters, as an indirect confirmation of the purchase. As of 2026, the reports of the UFC's purchase of the IFL have not been confirmed and IFL footage does not appear on UFC Fight Pass.

=== World Fighting Alliance ===
On December 11, 2006, the UFC acquired the assets of the World Fighting Alliance (WFA), and formed a WFA-focused subsidiary to handle these assets, including select fighter contracts. On the same day, it was reported that UFC was formalizing plans to buy World Extreme Cagefighting, to be run as a separate promotion.

=== World Extreme Cagefighting ===
Following the purchase of the World Extreme Cagefighting (WEC), UFC made several changes to the promotion. This included modifying the WEC's cage, transferring to a focus on lighter weight classes, giving it the ability to host events in Las Vegas, and having the championships of fighters who were contracted UFC fighters vacated. From 2007 to the end of 2010, the WEC was run as a separate promotion under the UFC banner, airing events 28 to 53 on Versus in the US and on The Score in Canada. On October 28, 2010, Dana White announced that the WEC would be absorbed into the UFC in early 2011.

=== Pride Fighting Championships ===
On March 27, 2007, it was announced that the UFC's Frank Fertitta III and Lorenzo Fertitta were acquiring the assets of Pride Fighting Championships, the UFC's largest rival, from Dream Stage Entertainment. To handle the take over, the Fertitta brothers created a new corporate entity to handle the assets, Pride FC Worldwide Holdings LLC. With common ownership in place, Zuffa and Pride Worldwide would be working closely together. Although goals of reviving Pride were not realized, many of Pride's assets, including contracts with fighters and intellectual property, are now regularly utilized by the UFC.

=== Strikeforce ===
On March 12, 2011, it was announced that the UFC had purchased Strikeforce in a deal made with partial owner Silicon Valley Sports and Entertainment. The amount of money involved has not been officially disclosed, however, it has been reported that the deal was worth $40 million. The deal included licensing rights, fighter contracts, and the Strikeforce video library. Strikeforce continued to operate as a separate company, similar to that of the WEC, until January 12, 2013. After the final show was held in Oklahoma City, the promotion was dissolved and several fighter contracts were absorbed into the UFC.

=== United Glory ===
When United Glory was originally formed in 2006, it was known as Ultimate Glory before a lawsuit with UFC forced a name change.

=== Invicta Fighting Championships ===
In June 2014 the UFC announced that they had signed a multi-year, multi-event broadcast deal to show and archive all Invicta Fighting Championships events on UFC Fight Pass. This has allowed the UFC to further expand its women's divisions by adding a strawweight division in July 2014, and signing Invicta fighters such as Carla Esparza and Felice Herrig.

=== Shooto ===
In June 2014 the UFC announced that they had signed a development deal with the recently revived, Vale Tudo Japan. A brand that was brought back in 2012 by the long running, Shooto promotion. The UFC plans on promoting and operating a new tournament series that will focus on 135 and 145 pound divisions. There were plans of a The Ultimate Fighter-like TV show to help promote these tournaments but it is unclear on what the status remains on it.

== Rules and features ==
The current rules for the Ultimate Fighting Championship were originally established by the New Jersey Athletic Control Board. The set of "Unified Rules of Mixed Martial Arts" that New Jersey established has been adopted in other states that regulate mixed martial arts, including Nevada, Louisiana, and California. These rules are also used by many other promotions within the United States, becoming mandatory for those states that have adopted the rules, and so have become the standard de facto set of rules for professional mixed martial arts across the country.

=== Rounds ===
UFC matches vary in maximum length, depending on whether the match is for a championship title, or is a fight card's "main event" fight. In all fights, each round can be no longer than five minutes. Championship fights last for a maximum of five rounds. Beginning with UFC 138 on November 5, 2011, non-championship "main event" fights (i.e. the final fight on the card) will also last for a maximum of five rounds. Non-main event bouts last for a maximum of three rounds. UFC 263 marked the first time in UFC history that a non-title bout other than the main-event was scheduled for 5 rounds. UFC on FX: Alves vs. Kampmann featured the organization's first two flyweight fights as part of its first flyweight tournament, which consists of bouts that, in the event of a draw, go to a fourth "sudden victory" round held to determine the winner, who advances. There is a one-minute rest period between rounds.

=== Cage ===
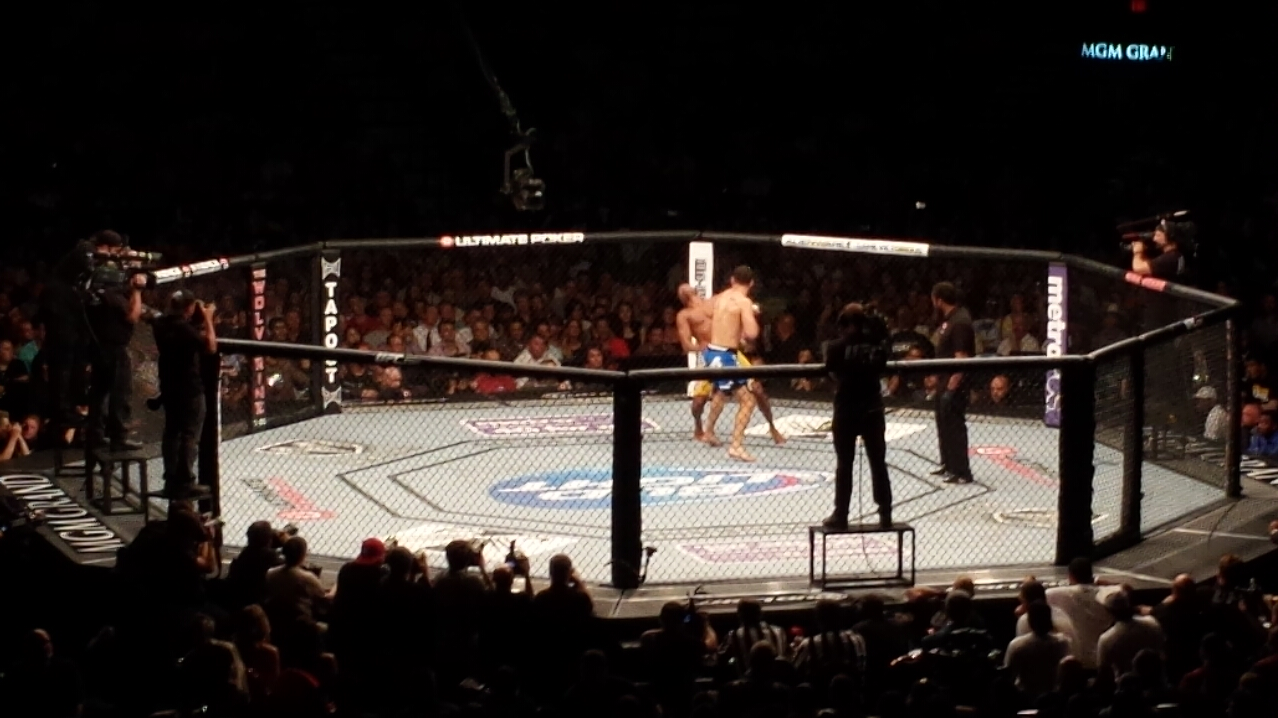
Shot of the Octagon as Chris Weidman upsets Anderson Silva at UFC 162

The UFC stages bouts in an eight-sided enclosure officially named "The Octagon". Originally, SEG trademarked the concept as well as the term and prevented other mixed martial arts promotions from using the same type of cage, but in 2001 Zuffa gave permission for other promotions to use octagonal cages, reasoning that the young sport needed uniformity to continue to win official sanctioning. Today Zuffa reserves exclusive use of the name "The Octagon".

The UFC cage is an octagonal structure with walls of metal chain-link fence coated with black vinyl. The standard octagon has a diameter of 30 ft (9.1 m) with a 6 ft (1.8 m) high fence. The cage sits atop a platform, raising it 4 ft (1.2 m) from the ground. It has foam padding around the top of the fence and between each of the eight sections. It also has two entry-exit gates opposite each other. The mat (also referred to as the canvas), painted with sponsorship logos and art, is replaced for each event.

For smaller venues and events, the UFC often uses a smaller cage, which is only 25 ft (7.6 m) across.

=== Attire ===
All competitors fight in approved shorts, without shoes. Tops are only approved for female competitors. Required safety equipment include padded gloves, mouthguard, and protective cups held in place with a jockstrap for males. The open-fingered gloves have at least 1" of padding around the knuckles, (110 to 170 g / 4 to 6 ounces) that allow fingers to grab. To ensure compliance, fighters are checked by a state athletic committee official before being allowed to enter the cage/ring.

Originally the attire for UFC was very open. Many fighters still chose to wear tight-fitting shorts or boxing-type trunks, while others wore long pants or singlets. Several wore wrestling shoes. Multi-time tournament champion Royce Gracie wore a Brazilian jiu-jitsu gi in all of his early appearances in UFC (Gracie wore shorts against Matt Hughes at UFC 60), while Art Jimmerson appeared in UFC 1 wearing one standard boxing glove. As of UFC 133 there has been a ban on speedo style shorts after Dennis Hallman wore one in his fight against Brian Ebersole. UFC president Dana White was so furious about the fighter's choice of attire that he awarded an honorary "getting those horrifying shorts off TV as soon as possible" bonus of $70,000 to Ebersole for finishing the fight in the first round, and in following post-fight interviews made it clear that speedo style shorts will no longer be tolerated.

==== Reebok uniform ====
On December 2, 2014, the UFC and Reebok held a press conference to announce an exclusive deal for Reebok to become the worldwide outfitter for the UFC, beginning in July 2015. Financial terms of the six-year partnership were not released, but UFC officials said that though the agreement represents the most valuable non-broadcast contract the company has ever signed, the UFC will not directly profit from the new deal. Instead, company execs said the deal is structured so that the "vast majority of the revenue" from the deal – taking out only the costs associated with administering the new program – will be paid directly to UFC fighters.

Payment on the new deal was originally expected to be based on the fighter's spot in the official UFC rankings, with the exception of the UFC champions. Fighters ranked No. 1 to 5 would be paid at one level, No. 6 to 10 at a lower level, No. 11 to 15 below that, and unranked fighters at a base rate. The payments would remain consistent regardless of where the athletes' bouts air. In addition to the per-fight rate, fighters would also receive royalty payments representing 20 percent of any UFC merchandise sold that bears their likeness. The royalty program would also include retired fighters and continue in perpetuity. The deal itself was reported to be worth 70 million dollars which was what the fighters would be paid over the next six years which is roughly 260 thousand dollars per UFC fight card. In April 2015, the UFC announced that they scrapped the idea of the ranking and that payment will be based on the fighter's number of bouts in the octagon, with different tiers (1–5 fights, 6–10 fights, 11–15 fights, and 16–20 fights). Exceptions are made in the event of title fights, with champions and title challengers receiving greater compensation. The kits were revealed on June 30, 2015. All kits feature the fighter's name on the back of the jersey and fighters have the option to choose between a universal kit or a country kit, related to their nationality. There is also a champion kit, designed to be used only by title holders.

The new deal meant that beginning with fight week for UFC 189 in Las Vegas, existing sponsors no longer appear on fighter clothing – not only on fight night but also at all pre-fight media appearances – and in-cage sponsor banners have also eliminated. Fighter camps are outfitted with approved clothing to create a uniform look in athletes' corners. Existing sponsors are still welcome to support UFC fighters. However, third-party logos are no longer allowed on UFC broadcasts, other than title-sponsor slots – similar to those seen with European soccer clubs – that the UFC may eventually sell to "a major, global brand" down the road.

==== Venum uniform ====
On July 11, 2020, UFC announced Venum as the exclusive outfitting partner from April 2021: UFC on ABC: Vettori vs. Holland was the first event with Venum outfits.

UFC announced in October 2021, that Avex Brasil, local producer of Venum brand apparel, has been named the exclusive manufacturer and distributor of UFC Replica Fight Kits and Fight Week apparel sold through retailers in Brazil. Under the terms of the agreement, Avex Brasil will manufacture officially licensed UFC replica fight kits and fight week apparel for men and women and distribute the product through the country.

=== New glove ===
On April 12, 2024, UFC announced a new glove where changes were made to reduce hand injuries and eye pokes (every 14 fights with an average delay of 50 seconds), while maintaining dexterity and not affecting performance. The new gloves were already tested during the ten weeks of the Dana White's Contender Series 2023 and gloves will be used starting June 2024. New features of the gloves include: (1) a wristband locking system to prevent grabbing of the gloves; (2) all seams are now on the palm side with a lack of seams on top of the hands to minimize abrasions and cuts; (3) removal of finger binding that allows the hand to close maturely to reduce eyes pokes, abrasions, and cuts; (4) padding to the sides of the index and pinky finger of the glove to protect bone; (5) ergonomic curved wristband for better fit around the wrist scooped or angled finger holes to eliminate bunching on the inside of the fisted hand lining; (6) and thicker foam padding for maximum flexibility and protection with an updated law profile hook and loop that minimizes snag and reduces weight; they have an authentication and data chip which allows the UFC to identify a pair of gloves to a fighter in a specific fight.

The gloves come in XXXS to XXXXL sizes with weight lighter by 1 to 1.5 ounces compared to the previous gloves; the new glove weighs between 3 and 4.9 oz. New gloves include five different glove colors: gun-metal gloves will be used for traditional UFC fights; gold gloves with an octagon trim for championship fights and main event bouts; black gloves for "The Ultimate Fighter"; blue gloves for Dana White's Contender Series; and red gloves for Road to the UFC tournaments.

On November 12, it was reported that the UFC had notified fighters competing in upcoming events, starting from UFC 309, that the organization will reintroduce its previous glove design, which had been replaced at UFC 302 in June. UFC president Dana White cited frequent complaints from fighters as being the reason for the change, even though the new design had only been in use for six months.

=== Match outcomes ===
Matches may end via:

- Submission: a fighter clearly taps the mat or their opponent, verbally submits, or clearly communicates being in pain (such as by yelling) to a degree that causes the referee to stop the fight. Also, a technical submission may be called when a fighter either loses consciousness or is on the verge of or suffers a serious injury while in a hold.
- Knockout: a fighter is put into a state of unconsciousness resulting from any legal strike.
- Technical Knockout (TKO): If the referee decides a fighter cannot continue, the fight is ruled as a technical knockout. Technical knockouts can be classified into three categories:
  - referee stoppage (the referee ends the fight because one fighter is deemed unable to intelligently defend themselves)
  - doctor stoppage (a ringside doctor decides that it is unsafe for one fighter to continue the bout, due to excessive bleeding or physical injuries)
  - corner stoppage (a fighter's cornerman/cornerwoman signals defeat for their own fighter)
  - forfeit (a fighter fails to compete or intentionally and prematurely ends the bout for a reason besides injury, resulting in the opponent's victory)
- Judges' Decision: Depending on scoring, a match may end as:
  - unanimous decision (all three judges score a win for fighter A)
  - majority decision (two judges score a win for fighter A, one judge scores a draw)
  - split decision (two judges score a win for fighter A, one judge scores a win for fighter B)
  - technical decision (a fighter is rendered unable to continue as a result of an unintentional illegal element or move, resulting in a decision based on the finished and unfinished rounds if the number of rounds to be judged is sufficient)
  - unanimous draw (all three judges score a draw)
  - majority draw (two judges score a draw, one judge scoring a win)
  - split draw (one judge scores a win for fighter A, one judge scores a win for fighter B, and one judge scores a draw)
  - technical draw (the bout ends in a manner similar to that of a technical decision, with the judges' scores resulting in a draw)
- Disqualification: a fighter intentionally executes an illegal move that is considered by the referee or opponent to be injurious or significant enough to negatively alter the opponent's performance should the fight continue, resulting in the opponent's victory.
- No Contest: a fighter is rendered unable to continue or compete effectively as a result of an unintentional illegal element or move and there is not a sufficient number of finished rounds to be judged to make a technical decision viable, or both fighters are rendered unable to continue or compete effectively. Also, a fight may be ruled a no-contest if the original outcome of the bout is changed due to unsatisfactory or illegal circumstances, such as a premature stoppage or a fighter's testing positive for banned substances.

In the event of a draw, it is not necessary that the fighters' total points be equal (see, e.g., UFC 41 Penn vs. Uno, or UFC 43 Freeman vs. White). However, in a unanimous or split draw, each fighter does score an equal number of win judgments from the three judges (0 or 1, respectively). Additionally, if a title fight ends in a draw, the defending champ retains the title.

=== Judging criteria ===
The ten-point must system is in effect for all UFC fights; three judges score each round and the winner of each receives ten points while the loser receives nine points or fewer (although 10–10 rounds are given in the rare event that a judge feels the rounds was too close to warrant giving one fighter 10 and the other 9.) Scores of 10–8 are typically awarded for dominant rounds and anything more dominant is scored less. 10–7 rounds are very rare, with only five known instances in UFC history—if a round is lopsided enough that a 10–7 score would be justified, the referee will usually declare a technical knockout and stop the fight as a safety precaution.

=== Fouls ===
The Nevada State Athletic Commission currently lists the following as fouls:

1. Head-butting
2. Eye-gouging
3. Biting
4. Hair pulling
5. Fish-hooking
6. Groin attacks
7. Putting a finger into any orifice or into any cut or laceration on an opponent (see Fish-hooking)
8. Small joint manipulation
9. Striking to the spine or the back of the head (see Rabbit punch)
10. Throat strikes of any kind, including, without limitation, grabbing the trachea
11. Clawing, pinching or twisting the flesh
12. Grabbing the clavicle (collarbone)
13. Kicking to the kidney with the heel
14. Spiking an opponent to the canvas on the head or neck (see Piledriver)
15. Throwing an opponent out of the ring or fenced area
16. Holding the shorts or gloves of an opponent
17. Spitting at an opponent or the referee
18. Engaging in unsportsmanlike conduct that causes an injury to an opponent
19. Holding or grabbing the ropes or the fence
20. Using abusive language in the ring or fenced area
21. Attacking an opponent on or during the break
22. Attacking an opponent who is under the care of the referee
23. Attacking an opponent after the bell (horn) has sounded the end of a round
24. Flagrantly disregarding the instructions of the referee
25. Timidity, including, without limitation, avoiding contact with an opponent, intentionally or consistently dropping the mouthpiece or faking an injury
26. Interference by the corner
27. Throwing in the towel during competition
28. Applying any foreign substance to the hair, body, clothing or gloves immediately prior to or during a contest or exhibition that could result in an unfair advantage
29. If the referee has signaled that the opponent has been knocked out, striking an opponent who is helpless as a result of previous blows and so supported by the ring or fenced area that he or she does not fall
30. Striking deliberately at the part of the body over the kidneys
31. Intentionally spitting out the mouthpiece

==== Fouls against a grounded opponent ====
1. Kicking the head of a grounded opponent (see soccer kick)
2. Kneeing the head of a grounded opponent
3. Stomping a grounded opponent

When a foul is charged, the referee, in their discretion, may deduct one or more points as a penalty. If a foul incapacitates a fighter, then the match may end in a disqualification if the foul was intentional, or a no contest if unintentional. If a foul causes a fighter to be unable to continue later in the bout, it ends with a technical decision win to the injured fighter if the injured fighter is ahead on points, otherwise it is a technical draw.

=== Match conduct ===
- After a verbal warning, the referee can stop the fighters and stand them up if they reach a stalemate on the ground (where neither are in a dominant position or working towards one). This rule is codified in Nevada as the stand-up rule.
- If the referee pauses the match, it is resumed with the fighters in their prior positions.
- Grabbing the cage brings a verbal warning, followed by an attempt by the referee to release the grab by pulling on the grabbing hand. If that attempt fails or if the fighter continues to hold the cage, the referee may charge a foul.
- Early UFC events disregarded verbal sparring/"trash-talking" during matches. Under unified rules, antics are permitted before events to add to the excitement and allow fighters to express themselves, but abusive language during combat is prohibited.

=== Evolution of the rules ===
- UFC 1 – Although the advertising said There Are No Rules, there were in fact some rules: no biting, no eye-gouging and no groin attacks. Fights ended only in the event of a knockout, submission or the corner throwing in the towel. Despite this, the first match in UFC 1 was won by referee stoppage, even though it was not officially recognized as such at the time.
- UFC 2 – Groin attacks were unbanned. Time limits were dropped ending the need for judges. Modifications to the cage were added (the fence became 5 feet tall but would continually grow in height afterwards and the floor became the canvas that is still used today).
- UFC 3 – The referee was officially given the authority to stop a fight in case of a fighter being unable to defend himself. A fighter could not kick if he was wearing shoes. This rule would later be discarded, then changed to 'no kicking with shoes while on the ground' and then reinstated, before finally being discarded.
- UFC 4 – After tournament alternate Steve Jennum won UFC 3 by winning only one bout, alternates (replacements) were required to win a pre-tournament bout to qualify for the role of an alternate.
- UFC 5 – The organizers introduced a 30-minute time limit. UFC 5 also saw the first Superfight, a one-off bout between two competitors selected by the organizers with the winner being crowned 'Superfight champion' and having the duty of defending his title at the next UFC.
- UFC 6 – The referee was given the authority to restart the fight. If two fighters were entangled in a position where there was a lack of action, the referee could stop the fight and restart the competitors on their feet, in their own corner. In UFC 6 they officially adopted the 5-minute extension to the 30-minute rule which had been used in UFC 5.
- Ultimate Ultimate 1995 – This event was the first to introduce the no fish-hooking rule and to reinstate judges. Time limits were changed to 15 minutes in the quarter-finals, 18 minutes in the semi-finals and 27 minutes in the finals.
- UFC 8 – Time limits changed to 10 minutes in the first two rounds of the tournament, 15 minutes in the tournament final and Superfight. Time limits would continually change in the later UFC events. Fights could now be decided by a judges decision if the fight reached the end of the time limit. The panel was made up of three judges who simply raised a card with the name of the fighter they considered to be the winner. In this fashion, a draw was not possible since the only two possible outcomes of a decision were 3 to 0 or 2 to 1 in favor of the winner.
- UFC 9 – To appease local authorities, closed fisted strikes to the head were banned for this event only. The commentators were not aware of this last minute rule that was made to prevent the cancellation of the event due to local political pressures. Referee "Big John" McCarthy made repeated warnings to the fighters to "open the hand" when this rule was violated. However, not one fighter was reprimanded. UFC 9 was also the last UFC event to feature the superfight.
- Ultimate Ultimate 1996 – This event was the first to introduce the "no grabbing of the fence" rule.
- UFC 12 – The main tournament split into a heavyweight (over 200 lb) and lightweight (200 lb and under) division; and the eight-man tournament ceased. Fighters now needed to win only two fights to win the competition. The Heavyweight Champion title (and title bouts) was introduced, replacing the Superfight title (albeit matches were still for a time branded as "Superfights").
- UFC 14 – The lightweight division was re-branded middleweight. The wearing of padded gloves, weighing 110 to 170 g (4 to 6 ounces), becomes mandatory. Gloves were to be approved by the UFC. Hair-pulling, groin strikes and kicks to a downed opponent became illegal.
- UFC 15 – Limits on permissible striking areas were introduced. Headbutts, elbow strikes to the back of neck and head, and small joint manipulation became illegal.
- UFC 21 – Five-minute rounds were introduced, with preliminary bouts consisting of two rounds, regular non-title bouts at three rounds, and title bouts at five rounds. The "ten-point must system" was introduced for scoring fights (identical to the system widely used in boxing).
- UFC 28 – The New Jersey State Athletic Control Board sanctions its first UFC event, using the newly developed Unified Rules of Mixed Martial Arts. Major changes to the UFC's rules included barring knee strikes to the head of a downed opponent, elbow strikes to the spine and neck and punches to the back of the neck and head. Limits on permissible ring attire, stringent medical requirements, and regulatory oversight were also introduced. A new weight class system was also introduced. This new set of rules is currently the de facto standard for MMA events held in the U.S. and is still in use by the UFC.
- UFC 31 – Weight classes are re-aligned to the current standard. Bantamweight moves from 150 to 155 and becomes known as lightweight. Lightweight becomes known as welterweight, middleweight becomes light heavyweight, and a new middleweight class is introduced at 185 pounds. Stools and seconds are first permitted in the Octagon between rounds.
- UFC 43 – In the event of a stoppage, fights restart in the position the fight was stopped.
- UFC 94 – After an incident where Georges St-Pierre was accused of putting vaseline on his back, corner men were disallowed from bringing vaseline into the Octagon. Petroleum jelly may now only be applied by UFC employed cutmen.
- UFC 97 – Foot-stomps are banned (for this event only).
- UFC 133 – Speedo style trunks are banned.
- UFC 138 – First 5-round non-title main event.
- UFC 263 – First 5-round non-title, non-main event bout.
- UFC Fight Night: Moreno vs. Albazi – (1) Kneeing and/or Kicking the head of a grounded opponent: A fighter shall be considered grounded and may not be legally kneed or kicked to the head when any part of their body other than their hands or feet is in contact with the canvas (ground).(2) Removal of the downward pointing elbow strike (12 to 6) as a foul.

=== The Ultimate Fighter rules ===
Fights that occur on The Ultimate Fighter are classified as exhibition matches under NSAC sanctioning, and thus do not count toward a fighter's professional record. Match outcomes also do not need to be immediately posted publicly, which allows for fight results to remain unknown to the public until the airdate of the episode.

For two-round matches, if there is a draw after two rounds, an extra five-minute round ("sudden victory") is contested. If the extra round concludes without a stoppage, the judges' decision will be based on that final round.

These exhibition matches variably have two or three rounds, depending on the rules used for each season. In most seasons, preliminary matches (before the semi-final bouts) were two rounds; in season two, all matches had three rounds. All matches past the first round use three rounds as per standard UFC bouts. During the finales for each series, the division finals have the standard three rounds, plus a fourth round if the judges score a tie.

== Weight divisions and current champions ==
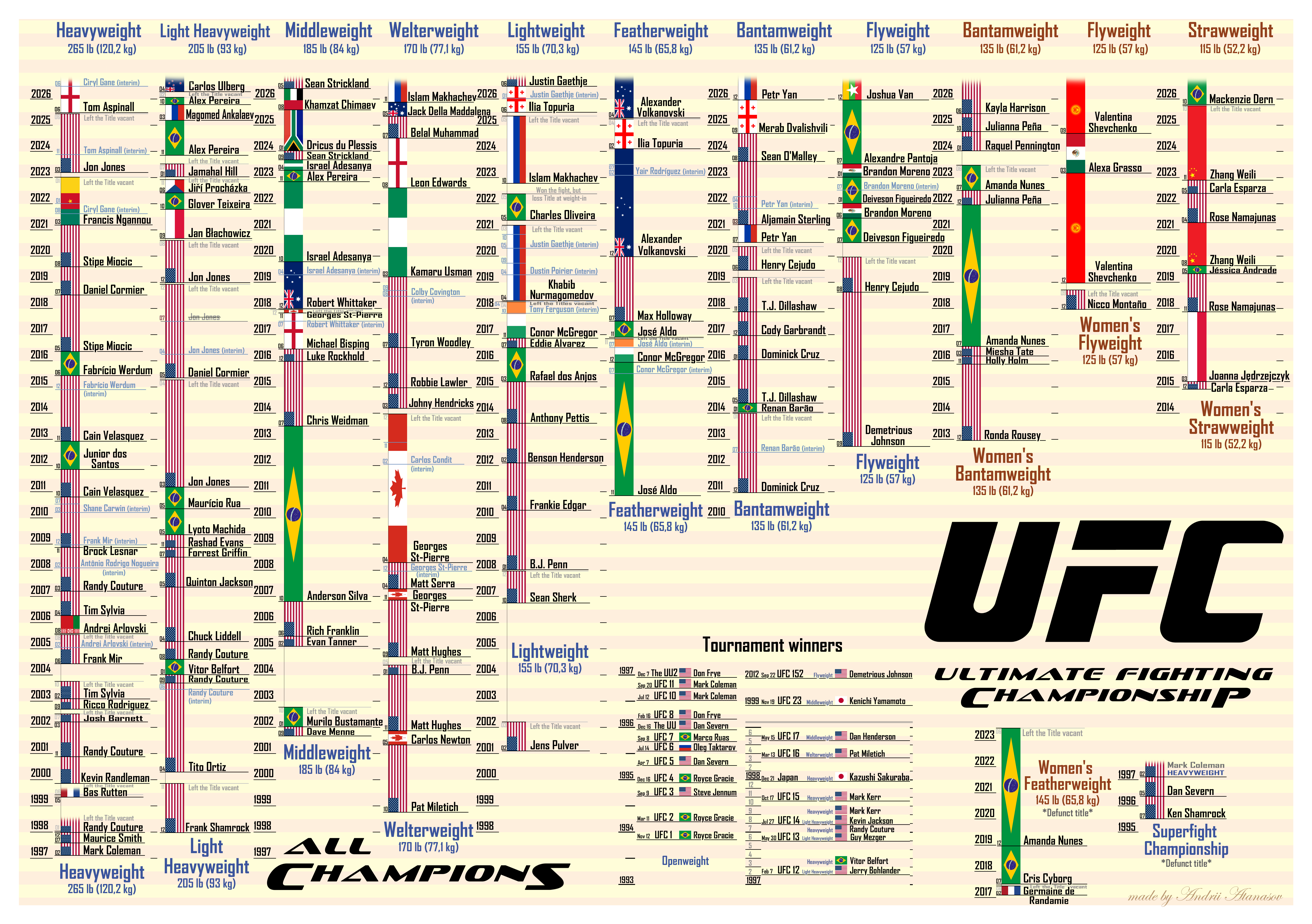

The UFC currently uses nine weight classes: Updated as of November 14, 2026, after UFC 334.

Weight class name	Minimum limit		Maximum limit		Gender	Current champion	Since	Ref	Days held	Defenses	Next Fight	Ref
Weight class name	in pounds (lb)	in kilograms (kg)	in pounds (lb)	in kilograms (kg)	Gender	Current champion	Since	Ref	Days held	Defenses	Next Fight	Ref
Strawweight	None	None	115	52.2	Women	(Brazil) Mackenzie Dern	October 25, 2025		389	1	TBD	
Flyweight	116	52.6	125	56.7	Men	(Myanmar) Joshua Van	December 6, 2025		347	2	UFC 336 – Manel Kape	
Flyweight	116	52.6	125	56.7	Women	(Brazil) Natália Silva	October 2, 2026		47	0	TBD	
Bantamweight	126	57.2	135	61.2	Men	(Russia) Petr Yan	December 6, 2025		347	1	TBD	
Bantamweight	126	57.2	135	61.2	Women	(United States) Kayla Harrison	June 7, 2025		529	1	TBD	
Featherweight	136	61.7	145	65.8	Men	(Australia) Alexander Volkanovski	April 12, 2025		585	2	TBD	
Lightweight	146	66.2	155	70.3	Men	(United States) Justin Gaethje	June 14, 2026		157	0	TBD	
Welterweight	156	70.8	170	77.1	Men	(Russia) Islam Makhachev	November 15, 2025		368	1	TBD	
Middleweight	171	77.6	185	83.9	Men	(United States) Sean Strickland	May 9, 2026		193	0	TBD	
Light Heavyweight	186	84.3	205	93.0	Men	(New Zealand) Carlos Ulberg	April 11, 2026		221	0	TBD	
Heavyweight	206	93.4	265	120.2	Men	(France) Ciryl Gane	September 14, 2026		65	1	TBD	

Non-title fights have a one-pound leniency. In title fights, the participants must weigh no more than that permitted for the relevant weight division. The Commission may also approve catch weight bouts, subject to their review and discretion. For example, the Commission may still decide to allow the contest the maximum weight allowed is 177 pounds if it feels that the contest would still be fair, safe, and competitive. In addition, there are five weight classes specified in the Unified Rules which the UFC does not currently use: Super Lightweight (165 pounds), Super Welterweight (175 pounds), Super Middleweight (195 pounds), Cruiserweight (225 pounds), and Super Heavyweight (>265 pounds).

== Roster ==
As of October 20, 2020, the UFC roster consisted of fighters from 71 countries. As of June 14, 2025, there are 596 fighters on the UFC roster, a plurality of which, 207 or 35%, are American. Despite having the largest pool of fighters, there are no male American champions in the UFC as of June 22, 2025.

=== Fighter salaries and contracts ===
UFC fighters are paid a substantially lower share of revenue than athletes in comparable sports, and other large MMA promotions. UFC fighters are paid per fight, with amounts depending on how well-known the fighters are and how well sponsored a fighter and an event is. Fighters will typically get paid money to fight, called show money, with an additional bonus if they win, called a win bonus. Despite not being officially confirmed by the UFC, Justin Gaethje revealed in January 2019 that headlining an event nets an additional $25,000 per fighter. While fighters new to the UFC can make as little as about $10,000 per fight (without a win bonus), more established fighters have made as much as $500,000 to $1 million per fight. Occasionally, fighters will earn more. For example, at UFC 202, Conor McGregor made a reported $3 million, a UFC record for one fight, while his opponent Nate Diaz made a reported $2 million. The combined $5 million made between the fighters was the largest combined fight purse in UFC history.

Cash bonuses are also awarded for "Fight of the Night" and "Performance of the Night" (formerly awarded separately as "Knockout of the Night"). The size of these bonuses can sometimes be US$80,000 (but are normally US$50,000). For less well-known fighters, they can be several times larger than the contracted amount for the fight. Contracted amounts generally have to be declared to the state athletic commission; however, the UFC also pays undisclosed locker-room bonuses to fighters. In early 2021, Dana White revealed that these bonuses vary from $4,000 to $25,000. In recent years, UFC fighters' contracts and merchandising rights have been the subject of dispute between fighters (represented by growing the Mixed Martial Arts Fighters Association) and UFC, which has attempted to defend existing regulations.

UFC is contractually bound to offer every fighter three fights per calendar year and if they don't, the organization has to pay the fighter for the lacking fights. For example, if the UFC offers a fighter only one fight during the year, they have to pay the fighter for two additional fights. However, if a fight is offered but turned down by the fighter, it is still counted as an offered fight from the contractual viewpoint.

Starting at UFC 273, three "Fan Bonus Of The Night", for every pay-per-view event, were awarded by Crypto.com, as part of Crypto.com UFC sponsorship incentive fight kits deal, for every pay-per-view event starting UFC 273. Viewers vote up to three times per pay-per-view on Crypto.com/FanBonus, starting from the opening of the PPV preliminary card and ending an hour after the conclusion of the main card. The bonuses are paid in bitcoin in US dollars ranging from US$30,000 for first place, US$20,000 for second place, and US$10,000 for third place. From 2023, the times these awards were given less frequent and not for every pay-per-view for unknown reasons.

Fighters are allowed to compete outside of the promotion in non-striking sports such as Brazilian jiu-jitsu and wrestling, provided they do not have a scheduled UFC bout within eight weeks of the competition.

== UFC rankings ==
As of January 27, 2020, it was announced through Twitter by Bruno Massami that the UFC has decided to separate its pound-for-pound ranking. Men and women will have their own pound-for-pound rankings.

=== Men's pound-for-pound ranking ===
Rankings released on November 17, 2026, after UFC 334.

Rank	ISO	Fighter	Record	Win streak	M	Weight class	Status	Next fight		
Rank	ISO	Fighter	Record	Win streak	M	Weight class	Status	Event	Opponent	Ref.
1	(Russia)	Islam Makhachev	29–1	17	Steady	Welterweight	Welterweight Champion			
2	(Australia)	Alexander Volkanovski	29–4	3	Steady	Featherweight	Featherweight Champion			
3	(Russia)	Petr Yan	21–5	5	Steady	Bantamweight	Bantamweight Champion			
4	(United States)	Justin Gaethje	28–5	3	Steady	Lightweight	Lightweight Champion			
5	(Georgia (country))	Ilia Topuria	17–1	0	Steady	Lightweight	#1 in lightweight rankings	(June 14, 2026) – Broken orbital		
6	(Myanmar)	Joshua Van	18–2	8	Steady	Flyweight	Flyweight Champion	UFC 336	Manel Kape	
7	(United States)	Sean Strickland	31–7	2	Steady	Middleweight	Middleweight Champion			
8	(France)	Ciryl Gane	15–2 (1 NC)	2	▲ +4	Heavyweight	Heavyweight Champion			
9	(England)	Tom Aspinall	15–3 (1 NC)	0	▼ −1	Heavyweight	#1 in heavyweight rankings	(March 7, 2026) – Eye surgery		
10	(Georgia (country))	Merab Dvalishvili	21–6	0	▼ −1	Bantamweight	#1 in bantamweight rankings			
11	(Brazil)	Alex Pereira	13–4	0	▼ −1	Heavyweight	#3 in light heavyweight rankings	UFC 335	Sergei Pavlovich	
12	(United Arab Emirates)	Khamzat Chimaev	15–1	0	▼ −1	Middleweight	#1 in middleweight rankings			
13	(Armenia)	Arman Tsarukyan	24–3	6	Steady	Lightweight	#2 in lightweight rankings			
14	(Brazil)	Alexandre Pantoja	30–7	0	Steady	Flyweight	#1 in flyweight rankings			
15	(New Zealand)	Carlos Ulberg	15–1	10	Steady	Light heavyweight	Light Heavyweight Champion	(April 18, 2026) – Torn ACL		

=== Women's pound-for-pound ranking ===
Rankings released on November 17, 2026, after UFC 334.

Rank	ISO	Fighter	Record	Win streak	M	Weight class	Status	Next fight		
Rank	ISO	Fighter	Record	Win streak	M	Weight class	Status	Event	Opponent	Ref.
1	(United States)	Kayla Harrison	20–1	5	▲ +1	Bantamweight	Bantamweight Champion			
2	(Kyrgyzstan)	Valentina Shevchenko	26–4–1	3	▼ −1	Flyweight	#1 in flyweight rankings	(September 1, 2026) – Back/Shoulder injury		
3	(China)	Zhang Weili	26–4	0	Steady	Flyweight; Strawweight	#1 in strawweight rankings			
4	(Brazil)	Natália Silva	21–5–1	15	Steady	Flyweight	Flyweight Champion			
5	(Brazil)	Mackenzie Dern	17–5	4	Steady	Strawweight	Strawweight Champion			
6	(Mexico)	Alexa Grasso	18–5–1	2	Steady	Flyweight	#2 in flyweight rankings			
7	(France)	Manon Fiorot	13–3	0	Steady	Flyweight	#3 in flyweight rankings			
8	(United States)	Tatiana Suarez	13–1	3	Steady	Strawweight	#2 in strawweight rankings			
9	(Canada)	Jasmine Jasudavicius	16–4	2	Steady	Flyweight	#4 in flyweight rankings			
10	(Brazil)	Amanda Nunes	23–6	0	New entry	Bantamweight	#1 in bantamweight rankings			
11	(United States)	Erin Blanchfield	14–3	0	▼ −1	Flyweight	#5 in flyweight rankings			
12	(United States)	Julianna Peña	12–6	0	▼ −1	Bantamweight	#2 in bantamweight rankings			
13	(Brazil)	Virna Jandiroba	23–5	0	▼ −1	Strawweight	#3 in strawweight rankings			
14	(United States)	Rose Namajunas	14–8	0	▼ −1	Flyweight	#6 in flyweight rankings			
15	(Brazil)	Denise Gomes	13–3	5	▼ −1	Strawweight	#4 in strawweight rankings			

== UFC events ==
MMA journalists and fans have criticized the UFC for putting on too many shows and thus diluting the quality of their product. (Note: Criticism for number of shows)

=== Production team ===
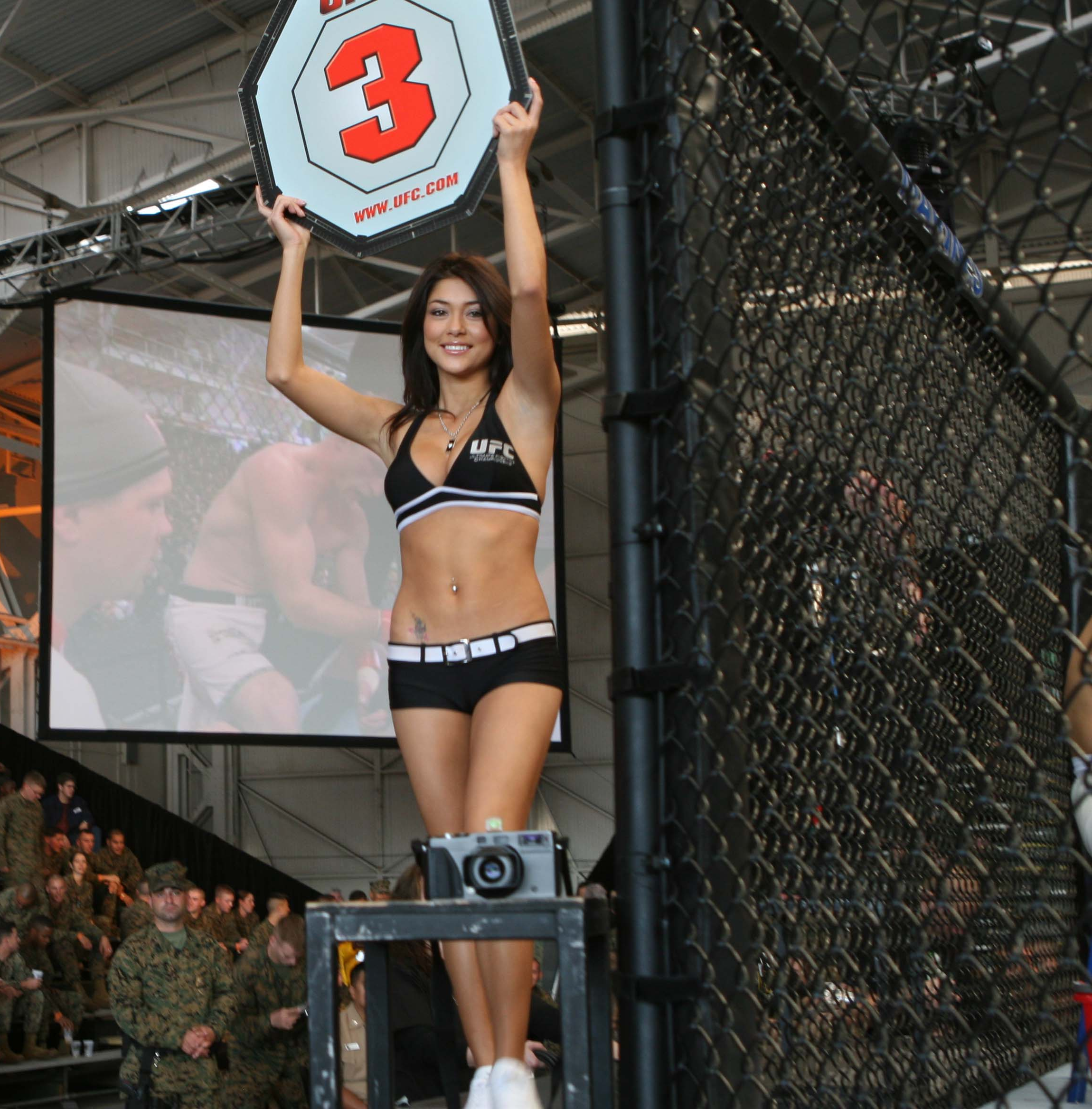
Octagon girl Arianny Celeste

Comedian, Brazilian jiu-jitsu and Taekwondo black belt Joe Rogan teams up with play-by-play announcer Jon Anik, UFC Hall of Famer Daniel Cormier and Megan Olivi to provide commentary during broadcasts of most UFC events in the US. For 20 years (Note: 1997–2016) Rogan and Mike Goldberg provided commentary at live events. The "Veteran Voice of the Octagon" is announcer Bruce Buffer. Arianny Celeste, Rachelle Leah, Brittney Palmer, Carly Baker, Vanessa Hanson, Chrissy Blair, Jhenny Andrade, Camila Oliveira, Luciana Andrade, Jamilette Gaxiola, and Red Dela Cruz are Octagon girls. Each fighter is assigned a cutman by the promotion who cares for the fighter before the fight and in between rounds. Jacob "Stitch" Duran was one of the best known cutmen working for the organization. Matches are made by matchmakers, and VP of Talent Relations, Joe Silva and Sean Shelby.

== UFC records ==
Record	Fighter	Number
Youngest Champion	Jon Jones	23 years, 8 months
Oldest Champion	Randy Couture	45 years, 146 days
Longest reign as a Champion	Anderson Silva	2,457d (6y 8m 22d)
Most championship reigns	Randy Couture	5
Most Bouts	Jim Miller	47
Most Wins	Jim Miller	28
Most Finishes	Charles Oliveira	21
Most Knockouts	Derrick Lewis	16
Most Submissions	Charles Oliveira	17
Most Decision Wins	Neil Magny	14
Most wins in title bouts	Jon Jones	16
Most title bouts	Jon Jones	17
Most consecutive title defenses	Demetrious Johnson	11
Longest winning streak	Islam Makhachev	17
Most Post Fight Awards	Charles Oliveira	21
Most Performance of the Night Awards	Charles Oliveira	14
Most Knockout of the Night Awards	Anderson Silva	7
Most Submission of the Night Awards	Joe Lauzon	6
Most Fight of the Night Awards	Justin Gaethje	11
Most total fight time	Max Holloway	8:52:43
Most takedowns in a single bout	Khabib Nurmagomedov	21 of 27 attempts
Fastest knockout	Jorge Masvidal	0:05
Fastest submission	Oleg Taktarov	0:09
Fastest Title Fight Knockout	Conor McGregor	0:13
Fastest Title Fight Submission	Ronda Rousey	0:14

== UFC Hall of Fame ==
Date of Induction	Entry	Wing	Ref.
November 21, 2003	Royce Gracie	Pioneer	
November 21, 2003	Ken Shamrock	Pioneer	
April 16, 2005	Dan Severn	Pioneer	
June 24, 2006	Randy Couture	Pioneer	
March 1, 2008	Mark Coleman	Pioneer	
July 11, 2009	Chuck Liddell	Pioneer	
July 11, 2009	Charles Lewis Jr.	Contributor	
May 29, 2010	Matt Hughes	Pioneer	
July 7, 2012	Tito Ortiz	Pioneer	
July 6, 2013	Forrest Griffin	Modern	
July 6, 2013	Griffin vs. Bonnar I	Fight	
July 5, 2014	Pat Miletich	Pioneer	
July 11, 2015	Bas Rutten	Pioneer	
July 11, 2015	B.J. Penn	Modern	
July 11, 2015	Hughes vs. Trigg II	Fight	
July 11, 2015	Jeff Blatnick	Contributor	
July 10, 2016	Antônio Rodrigo Nogueira	Pioneer	
July 10, 2016	Don Frye	Pioneer	
July 10, 2016	Coleman vs. Williams	Fight	
July 10, 2016	Bob Meyrowitz	Contributor	
July 6, 2017	Maurice Smith	Pioneer	
July 6, 2017	Kazushi Sakuraba	Pioneer	
July 6, 2017	Urijah Faber	Modern	
July 6, 2017	Joe Silva	Contributor	
July 5, 2018	Matt Serra	Pioneer	
July 5, 2018	Ronda Rousey	Modern	
July 5, 2018	Rua vs. Henderson	Fight	
July 5, 2018	Bruce Connal	Contributor	
July 5, 2018	Art Davie	Contributor	
July 5, 2019	Rich Franklin	Pioneer	
July 5, 2019	Michael Bisping	Modern	
July 5, 2019	Rashad Evans	Modern	
July 5, 2019	Sanchez vs Guida	Fight	
September 23, 2021	Kevin Randleman	Pioneer	
September 23, 2021	Georges St-Pierre	Modern	
September 23, 2021	Jones vs Gustafsson I	Fight	
September 23, 2021	Marc Ratner	Contributor	
June 30, 2022	Khabib Nurmagomedov	Modern	
June 30, 2022	Daniel Cormier	Modern	
June 30, 2022	Swanson vs. Choi	Fight	
July 6, 2023	Jens Pulver	Pioneer	
July 6, 2023	Anderson Silva	Pioneer	
July 6, 2023	José Aldo	Modern	
July 6, 2023	Donald Cerrone	Modern	
July 6, 2023	Lawler vs. MacDonald II	Fight	
June 27, 2024	Wanderlei Silva	Pioneer	
June 27, 2024	Maurício Rua	Modern	
June 27, 2024	Joanna Jędrzejczyk	Modern	
June 27, 2024	Frankie Edgar	Modern	
June 27, 2024	Silva vs. Sonnen I	Fight	
June 26, 2025	Vitor Belfort	Pioneer	
June 26, 2025	Mark Kerr	Pioneer	
June 26, 2025	Robbie Lawler	Modern	
June 26, 2025	Amanda Nunes	Modern	
June 26, 2025	Adesanya vs Gastelum	Fight	
June 26, 2025	Craig Piligian	Contributor	
July 9, 2026	Dominick Cruz	Modern	
July 9, 2026	Demetrious Johnson	Modern	
July 9, 2026	Chris Weidman	Modern	
July 9, 2026	Weili vs. Jędrzejczyk I	Fight	
July 9, 2026	Thomas Gerbasi	Contributor	

== Media ==
=== Television ===
==== Television programs produced by UFC ====
- UFC Connected is a magazine style television show. In 2018 the UFC announced a monthly show to be hosted by UK presenter Layla Anna-Lee With regular contributions from Dan Hardy and John Gooden, UFC Connected features a behind the scenes look at the UFC and its athletes. The show is also shown on BT Sport in the UK.
- UFC Now is a long running weekly television show presented by Karyn Bryant. The show has grown in popularity over the years where UFC fighters such as Cub Swanson, Kenny Florian and Alan Jouban appear as regular guests and analysts. The show is available on UFC Fight Pass and is aired on BT Sport in the UK. The show has regular segments such as breaking down the latest fighters for up and coming events, a roundhouse quiz, a top 5 selection and a rapid fire taking questions from fans via various social media platforms. Other guests who have regularly appeared are Michael Bisping, Tatiana Suarez, Daniel Cormier, Brendan Schaub, Brian Ortega and more throughout the years. It was reported in 2016 Schaub will no longer appear due to being banned from the show.
- UFC Tonight is a television series produced by Fox Sports 1 and the UFC. Hosted by Kenny Florian and Karyn Bryant, the program features the latest news, highlights, and analysis from the UFC. This program was carried over to FS1 from Fuel TV (now Fox Sports 2).
- UFC Unleashed is a television series produced by Spike TV and the UFC. It features matches from past UFC events. Episodes are one hour in length, showing several UFC bouts and "best of" compilations of popular fighters such as Chuck Liddell and Randy Couture. In Australia, the show can be seen on Weeknights on FX. In Sweden, the show can be seen on TV4 Sport. In Portugal, the show can be seen on Sic Radical. In Germany, the show can be seen on DSF. In the United Kingdom, the show can be seen on ESPN UK every Thursday at 10 pm. In Denmark, the show can be seen on Canal 8 Sport and Canal 9. In Finland, the show can be seen on MTV3 MAX. In France, the show can be seen on RTL9. In Brazil the show can be seen on Combate In Middle East, the show can be seen on ShowSports and FX Middle East.
- Fox UFC (until 2018)
- UFC All Access
- UFC Primetime
- UFC Ultimate Insider
- The Ultimate Fighter
- UFC on ESPN/ABC (2019–2025)
- UFC on CBS/Paramount+ (2026–present)

==== Appearances on other television programs ====
- Friends Season 3, Episode 24 "The One with the Ultimate Fighting Champion" is based around the UFC and features Jon Favreau as Pete Becker, Monica's millionaire boyfriend who seeks to become the "Ultimate Fighting Champion", losing his first fight due to his opponent "standing on [his] neck", and the second to a man who "Trains by traveling to Iran and pulling the arms off of thieves". In his third fight, Pete loses to a fighter who "goes for his favorite area", causing Ross to note Pete can no longer have kids.
- The Simpsons Season 21, Episode 2 "The Great Wife Hope" is largely based around the UFC where Marge ends up fighting in the octagon at the end of the episode. UFC president White said "We like fighting, but to make it sound like the UFC crowd is this bloodthirsty crowd that shows up and just want to see people get their (butts) kicked – that's not true. That's the stigma that the mainstream has of us". Chuck Liddell starred in the episode. A later reference was featured in the episode "The Way of the Dog" from Season 31, Episode 22 which aired on May 17, 2020, where Homer wanted to stay in to watch UFC 243 and said "Not tomorrow! Tomorrow is UFC fight 243", he was later seen watching the event on his phone at the seminar. UFC president White also shared the clip on his social media.
- Beavis and Butt-Head Season 8, Episode 14. It was first announced in 2011 that Beavis and Butt-Head would feature UFC in their comeback season. In the episode "Holding", you see Beavis and Butt-Head watching the UFC of which creator Mike Judge first announced saying "They're also watching UFC fights" at a comic-con that year. The episode first aired on` December 8, 2011, on MTV. UFC president White is a known fan of the show and has referenced Beavis and Butt-Head in the past as well as hanging out with creator Mike Judge in 2010 where it was reported "White says the UFC and Judge will be working together". In 2016, Judge created an official UFC 200 animated short featuring Daniel Cormier and Jon Jones.

=== Music ===
- UFC: Ultimate Beatdowns, Vol. 1, an album of music featured in and inspired by the UFC.

=== Video games ===
- Ultimate Fighting Championship (Dreamcast and PlayStation)
- UFC: Tapout (Xbox)
- UFC: Throwdown (GameCube, PlayStation 2)
- UFC: Tapout 2 (Xbox)
- UFC: Sudden Impact (PlayStation 2)
- UFC 2009 Undisputed (PlayStation 3 and Xbox 360)
- UFC Undisputed 2010 (PlayStation Portable, PlayStation 3, Xbox 360, iPod Touch, iPad, iPhone)
- UFC Personal Trainer (PlayStation 3, Xbox 360, Wii)
- UFC Undisputed 3 (PlayStation 3, Xbox 360)
- EA Sports UFC (PlayStation 4, Xbox One)
- EA Sports UFC 2 (PlayStation 4, Xbox One)
- EA Sports UFC 3 (PlayStation 4, Xbox One)
- EA Sports UFC 4 (PlayStation 4, Xbox One)
- EA Sports UFC 5 (PlayStation 5, Xbox Series X/S)
- EA Sports UFC 6 (PlayStation 5, Xbox Series X/S)

In January 2007, Zuffa and video game developer/publisher THQ announced a license agreement giving THQ worldwide rights to develop titles under the UFC brand. The agreement gives THQ exclusive rights to current and next-generation consoles as well as to PC and handheld titles. Also included are "certain wireless rights" which were not detailed. The licensing agreement was set to expire in 2011, although it appeared to have been extended to 2017. On June 4, 2012, THQ announced they will be giving the license of UFC Undisputed to EA.

=== Action figures ===
==== Round 5 ====
The first UFC action figure collectibles were released by Round 5 Corporation in May 2008. Series one of their figures includes Quinton "Rampage" Jackson, Matt Hughes, Tito Ortiz, and Randy Couture. Series two (released on November 10, 2008) includes Wanderlei Silva, Sean Sherk, Rich Franklin, and Anderson Silva.

In July 2009, Round 5 acquired the UFC license through Jakks Pacific and subsequently released five more series under the UFC and Pride brands. Two packs were released in August 2010 and include a UFC Octagon cage and Pride ring display stand. Limited edition versions include fabric walk-out tees or paint variations and are limited in number with foil and holographic packaging variances. Special edition and exclusive versions have been released at various UFC Fan Expo events.

==== Jakks Pacific ====
On June 10, 2008, it was announced that UFC had signed an exclusive four-year contract with Jakks Pacific to create action figures for UFC. As of 2009 the schedule envisages the release of these figures in November 2009. They have currently been 8 series released and they feature special Legends, Pride, and WEC style figures as well. Three 2 packs series have also been released, as well as several expo and internet exclusives. There are also several different octagon cage playsets that have been released, including the "Octagon Playset", "Official Scale Octagon Playset", and "Electronic Reaction Octagon Playset". A Pridestyle ring playset was also originally planned; however, no news have been given on its status or release date since then.

Jakks Pacific UFC Deluxe Figure Lineups

- Series 0: Royce Gracie (Legends Packaging), Brock Lesnar, Frank Mir, Rashad Evans, Keith Jardine, Houston Alexander, Kendall Grove, Miguel Angel Torres (WEC Packaging)
- Series 1: Chuck Liddell, Anderson Silva, Forrest Griffin, Michael Bisping, Evan Tanner (Legends Packaging), Kevin Randleman (Pride Packaging), Cheick Kongo, Mike Swick
- Series 2: Nate Marquardt, Antônio Rodrigo Nogueira, Mike Thomas Brown (WEC Packaging), Bas Rutten (unreleased in this series, moved to series 6), Georges St-Pierre (unreleased in this series, moved to series 6), Lyoto Machida (unreleased in this series, moved to series 5), Quinton Jackson (unreleased in this series, moved to series 8), Thiago Alves (unreleased in this series, moved to series 6)
- Series 3: Chuck Liddell and Mark Coleman (Legends Packaging), Karo Parisyan, B.J. Penn, Jon Fitch, Thiago Silva, Maurício Rua (Pride Packaging)
- Series 4: Wanderlei Silva, Sean Sherk, Rich Franklin, Matt Hughes, Kimbo Slice, Jamie Varner (WEC Packaging), Don Frye (Legends Packaging), Andrei Arlovski (unreleased in this series, later released in series 7)
- Series 5: Lyoto Machida (1 of 100 inserts were also released randomly and contained a special die cast version of the UFC belt), Quinton Jackson (Pride Packaging), Matt Hamill, Dan Severn (Legends), Kenny Florian, Matt Serra, Stephan Bonnar
- Series 6: Thiago Alves, Randy Couture (unreleased, was originally supposed to be a 1 of 100 inserts that was to be released randomly and contain a special die cast version of the UFC belt), Georges St-Pierre, Clay Guida, Frank Mir, Tito Ortiz, Jens Pulver (WEC Packaging), Bas Rutten (Legends)
- Series 7 (if bought at Target, each of them, except for Nogueira, also came with a replica UFC event mini-poster): B.J. Penn (Legends Packaging), Anderson Silva, Andrei Arlovski, Forrest Griffin (Legends Packaging), Diego Sanchez, Antônio Rodrigo Nogueira (Pride Packaging, 1 of 100 inserts were also released randomly and contained a special die-cast version of the Pride belt)
- Series 8: Matt Hughes (Legends Packaging), Chuck Liddell (Pride Packaging), Frankie Edgar (1 of 100 inserts were also released randomly and contained a special die-cast version of the UFC belt), Nate Diaz, Quinton Jackson

Jakks Pacific UFC Deluxe 2 Packs Figures Lineups

- Series 1: Chuck Liddell vs. Wanderlei Silva, Frank Mir vs. Brock Lesnar, Anderson Silva vs. Rich Franklin
- Series 2: Lyoto Machida vs. Shogun Rua, Georges St-Pierre vs. Matt Hughes, Randy Couture vs. Chuck Liddell (was supposed to be canceled due to copyright issues; however, 1,000 packs managed to make it to several K-Mart stores)
- Series 3: Chuck Liddell vs. Tito Ortiz, B.J. Penn vs. Kenny Florian, Dan Severn vs. Royce Gracie (Legends Packaging)
- Expos Exclusives: Georges St-Pierre (Boston Expo 2010, 1 of 500)
- Ringside Collectibles Internet Exclusives: Forrest Griffin vs. Stephan Bonnar
  The Ultimate Fighter Season 1 Final, Dana White, Quinton Rampage Jackson 1 of 1000

==== Jazwares ====
In 2020, the UFC and toy company Jazwares entered into an agreement to release a new line of UFC action figures. The first wave of Jazwares' UFC figures were scheduled to be released in Fall 2020.

=== DVDs ===
Various UFC events have been released onto DVD. UFC 23 through UFC 29 were not released in the US on home video or DVD by SEG. They have since been released onto boxsets which feature around 10 events each set, in chronological order.

=== PlayStation Network and Xbox Live ===
UFC on-demand content launched for Xbox 360 on December 20, 2011. Subscribers were able to view pay-per-view events in high definition, connect with friends to predict fight results, and have the ability to compare fighter statistics and records. The UFC Fight Pass application was also planned for PlayStation 4 in early 2015. In 2015, UFC Fight Pass became available on the Xbox One. In December 2022, a PlayStation version of the app was released.

=== NFTs ===
In August 2021, the UFC began to release NFTs to commemorate big fights, milestones and moments via their official trading card partner, Panini America.

== International broadcasters ==
The UFC's PPV events are broadcast live on pay-per-view in the US and TNT Sports Box Office in the United Kingdom.

=== United Kingdom ===
In the UK; BT Sport's first ever live event was August 3, 2013 UFC 163 headlined by José Aldo and The Korean Zombie. BT Sport were the first major broadcaster in the UK for the UFC where previously they had small coverage on Bravo, Setanta Sports and finally ESPN UK in August, 2012 until the BT Sport deal was in place.

As of August 2025, TNT Sports, the successor of BT Sport, holds exclusive rights to UFC in the United Kingdom.

=== Mexico ===
Events are broadcast live on Fighting Sports Network in Pay TV (Cable and Satellite) of SKY Satellite. Free TV Channels in Mexico, Fox Sports and Fox Premium in Pay TV (Cable and Satellite) Central America are broadcast with tape-delay.

=== Brazil ===
In Brazil, events are broadcast live on open television through Rede Bandeirantes, which transmits the Fight Night events and preliminary cards of main events, while the numbered events are on Fight Pass. Previously, Rede Globo broadcast it on its own martial arts channel Combate from 2011 to 2022, with select events on its broadcast network.

=== Asia ===
In Southeast Asia (exclude the Philippines), Hong Kong, and Papua New Guinea, UFC events are broadcast on Fox Movies Premium (2012–2013) and Fox Sports (2013–2021).

In India, events are broadcast on Sony Ten 2, Sony Ten 1, Sony Ten 1 HD and Sony Ten 2 HD.

In the Philippines, UFC was also aired on Balls (now ABS-CBN Sports + Action HD) from 2009 until 2015, since moved to Sports5 (including TV5, AksyonTV and Hyper on Channel 91 (SD) and 261 (HD) via Cignal) starting January 3, 2016 until December 31, 2018, on TAP Digital Media Ventures Corporation-owned sports cable television channel Premier Sports from October 2021 to December 2025, and on Disney+ Philippines via ESPN hub since October 2026.

In Sri Lanka, UFC events have been broadcast on several television networks over the years. Previously, UFC events were aired on various channels from 2012 to 2017, including Dialog TV and PEO TV. Starting January 15, 2018, Sony Sports Ten 2 became the primary broadcaster for UFC events in Sri Lanka, airing the events in English. Additionally, UFC events have been available via UFC Fight Pass, which offers live streaming of events and on-demand content for viewers in Sri Lanka.

In Indonesia, UFC events are currently broadcast on tvOne starting January 15, 2018; previously, this events was also broadcast on RCTI, iNews since 2012 until the end of 2017.

=== United Arab Emirates ===
On April 13, 2019, UFC's event was broadcast on Abu Dhabi Media.

=== Poland ===
In Poland since 2018 the official broadcaster of UFC it's Polsat Sport. Previously the UFC events in this nation are broadcast by Orange Sport and Extreme Sports Channel. The main Polish broadcasters of UFC telecasts, are Andrzej Janisz and Łukasz "Juras" Jurkowski.

=== Canada ===
In 2024, Rogers successfully bid for the rights to broadcast UFC in Canada on its Sportsnet channels. The UFC was previously on Sportsnet and French broadcaster TVA from September 2011 through the end of 2014 in Canada.

=== Russia ===
In Russian, UFC events are broadcast on Match TV, a Russian sports channel owned by Gazprom Media, starting 2022.

== See also ==
- List of UFC champions
- List of UFC events
- List of current UFC fighters
- List of UFC bonus award recipients
- UFC Fight Pass
- Ultimate Fighting Championship controversies
