= David Isaacs =

David Isaacs may refer to:

- David Isaacs (singer) (1946–2009), Jamaican reggae singer
- David Isaacs (writer) (born 1949), American TV screenwriter and producer
- David Isaacs (UFC Cofounder), American TV/live event producer and UFC Cofounder

== See also ==
- David Isaac (disambiguation)
- Isaac Davis (disambiguation)
