= David Isaacs (businessman) =

Media and technology entrepreneur

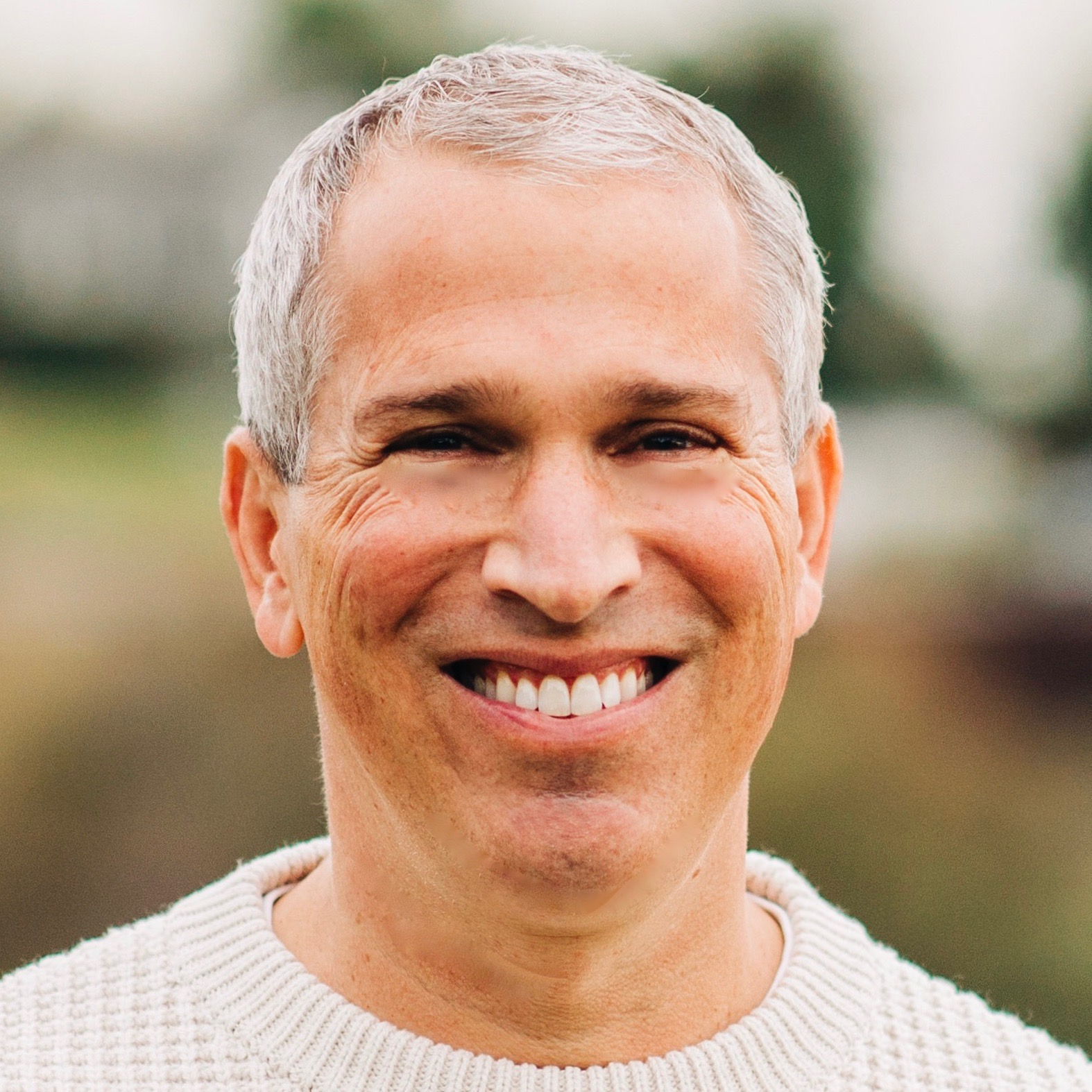
UFC Founder David Isaacs

David Isaacs is a media and technology entrepreneur and TV/live event producer best known as a cofounder of the UFC.

== Early life and education ==
Isaacs was born on May 20, 1966, in Washington DC where his father was a reporter and editor for the Washington Post and his mother was a high school English teacher. After Isaacs graduated from The Blake School in Minneapolis, MN, he attended Harvard University where he graduated with honors degrees in Economics and Law.

== Career ==
=== Bertelsmann & Semaphore Entertainment Group ===
After law school, Isaacs began work for Bertelsmann AG in Germany and then with its US subsidiary BMG Music While helping form BMG Ventures, he began working with Semaphore Entertainment Group, a joint venture subsidiary focused on pay-per-view concerts and events, and its CEO Bob Meyrowitz. Isaacs joined SEG in 1992 where he became Chief Operating Officer.

=== The Ultimate Fighting Championship ===
In November 1993, SEG launched The Ultimate Fighting Championship. As a co-founder and executive producer, Isaacs was involved with almost every aspect of building the new sport. Isaacs’ oversight was integral to keeping the UFC alive when it faced some of its most difficult challenges in the mid and late 1990s, including moving the entire live event (including the fighters, production and the famed Octagon) in one day from Niagara Falls to Dothan, Alabama, when New York State issued a last minute ban.

=== Zilo Networks ===
Isaacs left the UFC in 1999 to co-found (with SEG’s head programmer Campbell McLaren) and serve as CEO for the nation’s largest college television network, Zilo Networks. Zilo became well known for its innovative transmedia programming and for leveraging the prank series Get $tupid to help launch CollegeHumor.com (later acquired by IAC).

=== Recent Start-Ups & Productions ===
After selling Zilo to Sirk Productions in 2008, Isaacs has founded, run and advised multiple media/entertainment companies backed by top firms in the venture capital (Greycroft, Sutter Hill Ventures, and Jerusalem Venture Partners) and entertainment (Skybound) industries. In addition, Isaacs has executive produced noteworthy series and events including: the world’s first giant robot battle (MegaBotsvs. Suidobashi) for Twitch, The Walking Dead Escape live event tour, The College Music Awards, The Extreme team College Games, The Off the Hook Comedy Tour, and BET’s reality series Iron Ring. (one of the highest rated premieres in the network’s history). Late January 2019 he began his role as Chairman of the Advisory Board for the expanding Football League known as the American 7s Football league (A7FL).

== Personal life ==
Isaacs resides in Santa Monica, CA, with his wife and daughter.
