= Gustavo López =

Gustavo López may refer to:

- Gustavo López (footballer, born 1973), Argentine football winger
- Gustavo López (footballer, born 1983), Argentine football attacking midfielder
- Gustavo Lopez (fighter) (born 1985), American MMA fighter
