= Nicdali Rivera-Calanoc =

American mixed martial artist

- Born: June 12, 1987 (age 39)
- Other names: The Night Queen
- Nationality: American
- Height: 5 ft 3 in (1.60 m)
- Weight: 106 lb (48 kg; 7.6 st)
- Division: Atomweight; Strawweight
- Fighting out of: West Palm, Florida
- Team: Underdawgs Fight Team
- Years active: 2006–2017

Mixed martial arts record
- Total: 24
- Wins: 11
- By knockout: 4
- By decision: 7
- Losses: 13
- By knockout: 1
- By submission: 6
- By decision: 6

Other information
- Mixed martial arts record from Sherdog

Nicdali Rivera-Calanoc (born June 12, 1987, is an American mixed martial artist who competed in the Atomweight division. She was signed with Invicta FC. After her fight against Jodie Esquibel at Invicta FC 9, Nicdali announced that she had decided before the fight that it would be her last fight as she did not resign her contract. However, she would come out of retirement less than a year later for the Combate Americas promotion and continued her fighting career. After only a few more fights, she would again announce her retirement. In July 2017, she was named the fight director for Combate Americas. In 2023, Nicdali made another return to fighting.

== Mixed martial arts record ==
Professional record breakdown
24 matches	11 wins	13 losses
By knockout	4	1
By submission	0	6
By decision	7	6

Res.	Record	Opponent	Method	Event	Date	Round	Time	Location	Notes
Win	11–13	Stephanie Alba	Decision (unanimous)	Melee 6	March 22, 2026	3	5:00	San Antonio, Texas, United States	
Loss	10–13	Dania Cruz	Submission (armbar)	Med City FC 3	May 31, 2025	2	3:47	Rochester, Minnesota, United States	Catchweight (121 lb) bout; Cruz missed weight.
Loss	10–12	Sayury Canon	Submission (armbar)	Combate Global: Female 1	March 13, 2025	1	4:48	Miami, Florida, United States	
Loss	10–11	Hope Holmes	Decision (split)	Peak Fighting 41	December 7, 2024	3	5:00	Tulsa, Oklahoma, United States	Catchweight (110 lb) bout.
Win	10–10	Elizabeth Avila	Decision (split)	Combate Global: El Showdown	July 16, 2023	3	5:00	Miami, Florida, United States	
Loss	9–10	Lisbeth López Silva	Submission (rear-naked choke)	Combate 10	January 19, 2017	1	3:07	Mexico City, Mexico	Return to Atomweight.
Win	9–9	Ronni Nanney	Decision (split)	Freestyle Cage Fighting 51	March 12, 2016	3	3:00	Shawnee, Oklahoma, United States	
Loss	8–9	Kyra Batara	Decision (unanimous)	Combate Americas: Road to the Championship 1	September 17, 2015	3	5:00	Las Vegas, Nevada, United States	Return to Strawweight.
Loss	8–8	Jodie Esquibel	Decision (unanimous)	Invicta FC 9	November 1, 2014	3	5:00	Davenport, Iowa, United States	
Loss	8–7	Jessica Penne	Submission (rear-naked choke)	Invicta FC 6	July 13, 2013	1	4:57	Kansas City, Missouri, United States	
Win	8–6	Angelica Chavez	Decision (unanimous)	Invicta FC 2	July 28, 2012	3	5:00	Kansas City, Kansas, United States	
Loss	7–6	Amy Davis	Submission (kimura)	Invicta FC 1	April 28, 2012	2	3:47	Kansas City, Kansas, United States	Atomweight debut.
Loss	7–5	Felice Herrig	Decision (unanimous)	Xtreme Fighting Organization 39	May 13, 2011	3	5:00	Hoffman Estates, Illinois, United States	
Win	7–4	Summer White	TKO (punches)	Maxximo FC 11	October 16, 2010	1	3:12	Ponce, Puerto Rico	Catchweight (120 lb) bout.
Loss	6–4	Sally Krumdiack	Decision (unanimous)	Freestyle Cage Fighting 36	October 24, 2009	3	5:00	Shawnee, Oklahoma, United States	
Win	6–3	Shoni Esquiro	Decision (unanimous)	Freestyle Cage Fighting 33	June 27, 2009	3	5:00	Durant, Oklahoma, United States	
Loss	5–3	Miku Matsumoto	TKO (knees to the body)	DEEP 41 Impact	April 16, 2009	1	0:21	Tokyo, Japan	Return to Strawweight.
Win	5–2	Shawn Tamaribuchi	Decision (unanimous)	Freestyle Cage Fighting 22	August 23, 2008	3	5:00	Shawnee, Oklahoma, United States	
Loss	4–2	Angela Magaña	Decision (split)	Freestyle Cage Fighting 19	May 31, 2008	3	3:00	Claremore, Oklahoma, United States	
Win	4–1	Stephanie Palmer	TKO (punches)	Freestyle Cage Fighting 16	January 19, 2008	1	1:24	Tulsa, Oklahoma, United States	
Loss	3–1	Patti Lee	Submission (heel hook)	HOOKnSHOOT: BodogFight Women's Tournament	November 24, 2007	1	2:59	Evansville, Indiana, United States	2007 BodogFight Women's Tournament Semifinal.
Win	3–0	Jen Babcock	KO (punches)	HOOKnSHOOT: BodogFight Women's Tournament	November 24, 2007	1	0:30	Evansville, Indiana, United States	Flyweight debut. 2007 BodogFight Women's Tournament Quarterfinal.
Win	2–0	Tammie Schneider	Decision (unanimous)	Freestyle Cage Fighting 14	October 13, 2007	3	3:00	Shawnee, Oklahoma, United States	
Win	1–0	Sarika Patel	TKO (punches)	American Cage Fighting: Showdown at Sundown	March 10, 2006	1	2:03	Stillwater, Oklahoma, United States	Strawweight debut.
