= Gustavo Lopez (fighter) =

American mixed martial arts fighter

- Born: Gustavo Hernandez Lopez; June 27, 1989 (age 37); Wapato, Washington, United States
- Height: 5 ft 5 in (1.65 m)
- Weight: 135 lb (61 kg; 9 st 9 lb)
- Division: Bantamweight
- Reach: 67.0 in (170 cm)
- Stance: Orthodox
- Fighting out of: Las Vegas, Nevada
- Team: Yakima MMA (until 2015); Xtreme Couture (2015–present); 10th Planet Jiu Jitsu Las Vegas
- Rank: Brown belt in Brazilian Jiu-Jitsu
- Years active: 2012–present

Mixed martial arts record
- Total: 27
- Wins: 16
- By knockout: 7
- By submission: 8
- By decision: 1
- Losses: 10
- By knockout: 5
- By decision: 5
- Draws: 1

Other information
- University: Yakima Valley College; Menlo College
- Mixed martial arts record from Sherdog

Gustavo Hernandez Lopez (born June 27, 1989) is an American mixed martial artist who competes in the Bantamweight division. A professional since 2012, he has competed for the Ultimate Fighting Championship. He is the current Bantamweight Champion in the Slovak fighting promotion Real Fight Arena (RFA).

== Background ==
Lopez was raised in Wapato, Washington, along with two brothers. As a freshman in 2004, Lopez started his wrestling career at Wapato High School after his friends “tricked” him into trying out for the team. Four seasons, three state appearances and two medals at Mat Classic initially led to a full athletic scholarship to Stanford University. Nevertheless, Gustavo didn't want to leave his recently widowed mother and move to California, so he resorted to turn the offer down and attend local Yakima Valley College. While competing there, he qualified for the NJCAA tournament twice while earning an associate’s degree in business accounting.

While in community college, Gustavo began training at Yakima MMA and after a friend asked Lopez to corner a fight and a fighter on the card dropped out on the day of the event, Lopez agreed to step in and knocked out his opponent in seven seconds. He won his next eight amateur fights, turning pro in 2009 after it became difficult to find challengers. During the same time period, he became a nationally ranked NAIA wrestler at 141 pounds and earned his bachelor's degree in finance at Menlo College in 2014.

== Mixed martial arts career ==
=== Early career ===
Starting his professional career in 2012, Lopez started out with Cagesport, where he went 2–1, before fighting for Bellator MMA at Bellator 2014 Monster Energy Cup against Sean Cantor, who he beat by first round rear-naked choke.

After this, he signed with Combate Americas, where he would mostly fight for the next 4 years. During this run, he fought for the Bantamweight title 3 times, losing the first two times to John Castañeda and José Alday, before winning on the third time in a rematch against José Alday at Combate 33 via TKO in the first round. He then defended the title against Joey Ruquet at Combate 42 on August 23, 2019. He won the fight via KOing Ruquet in a first round.

=== Ultimate Fighting Championship ===
On June 11, 2020, news broke that Lopez had signed with the UFC and would be replacing Ray Borg on short notice against Merab Dvalishvili on June 13, 2020, at UFC on ESPN: Eye vs. Calvillo. However, Combate Americas' CEO Campbell McLaren claimed they were not given a right to match UFC's offer and Lopez is still under the contract matching period. However, the contract dispute was eventually sorted out and Lopez was allowed to join the UFC. He lost the bout via unanimous decision.

Lopez faced Anthony Birchak, replacing Felipe Colares, on November 7, 2020, at UFC on ESPN: Santos vs. Teixeira. He won the fight via a submission in round one.

Lopez faced Adrian Yañez on March 20, 2021, at UFC on ESPN 21. He lost the fight via knockout in round three.

Lopez faced Alateng Heili on September 18, 2021, at UFC Fight Night 192. The fight ended up with a draw.

After the draw, it was announced that Lopez was no longer on the UFC roster.

=== Post UFC ===
In his first bout after his UFC release, Lopez faced Filip Macek on December 30, 2022, at Oktagon 38 for the Interim OKMMA Bantamweight Championship, winning the bout and the title via guillotine choke at the end of the first round.

He would face reigning champion Jonas Mågård on April 15, 2023 at Okatgon 41, losing the bout in the second round via TKO stoppage.

He would attempt to rebound against Beno Adamia on October 7, 2023 at Oktagon 47, however he would end up losing the bout via unanimous decision.

== Championships and accomplishments ==
- Oktagon MMA
  - OKMMA Interim Bantamweight Championship (one time)
- Combate Americas
  - Combate Americas Bantamweight Championship (one time; former)
    - One successful defense

== Mixed martial arts record ==
Professional record breakdown
| 27 matches | 16 wins | 10 losses |
| By knockout | 7 | 5 |
| By submission | 8 | 0 |
| By decision | 1 | 5 |
| Draws | 1 | |

| Res. | Record | Opponent | Method | Event | Date | Round | Time | Location | Notes |
|---|---|---|---|---|---|---|---|---|---|
| Loss | 16–10–1 | Dávid Šajben | Decision (unanimous) | Real Fight Arena 29 | March 20, 2026 | 5 | 5:00 | Bratislava, Slovakia | Lost the RFA Bantamweight Championship. |
| Loss | 16–9–1 | Aboubakar Younousov | KO (punches) | Ares FC 35 | October 18, 2025 | 1 | 1:25 | Strasbourg, France | For the Ares FC Bantamweight Championship. |
| Win | 16–8–1 | Petr Stříž | Submission (guillotine choke) | Real Fight Arena 23 | May 30, 2025 | 1 | 3:12 | Ostrava, Czech Republic | Won the vacant RFA Bantamweight Championship. |
| Win | 15–8–1 | Šimon Bruknar | TKO (punches) | Professional Muaythai League 15 | May 3, 2025 | 3 | 3:14 | Žilina, Slovakia | Catchweight (139 lb) bout. |
| Win | 14–8–1 | Denis Tripšanský | TKO (leg injury) | Professional Muaythai League 13 | January 25, 2025 | 3 | 0:37 | Hlohovec, Slovakia | Return to Featherweight. |
| Loss | 13–8–1 | Beno Adamia | Decision (unanimous) | Oktagon 47 | October 7, 2023 | 3 | 5:00 | Bratislava, Slovakia | Catchweight (139.7 lb) bout; Lopez missed weight. |
| Loss | 13–7–1 | Jonas Mågård | TKO (punches) | Oktagon 41 | April 15, 2023 | 2 | 0:31 | Liberec, Czech Republic | For the Oktagon Bantamweight Championship. |
| Win | 13–6–1 | Filip Macek | Submission (guillotine choke) | Oktagon 38 | December 30, 2022 | 1 | 4:44 | Prague, Czech Republic | Won the interim Oktagon Bantamweight Championship. |
| Draw | 12–6–1 | Alateng Heili | Draw (unanimous) | UFC Fight Night: Smith vs. Spann | September 18, 2021 | 3 | 5:00 | Las Vegas, Nevada, United States | Alateng was deducted one point in round 3 due to repeatedly grabbing the cage. |
| Loss | 12–6 | Adrian Yañez | KO (punch) | UFC on ESPN: Brunson vs. Holland | March 20, 2021 | 3 | 0:27 | Las Vegas, Nevada, United States | |
| Win | 12–5 | Anthony Birchak | Submission (rear-naked choke) | UFC on ESPN: Santos vs. Teixeira | November 7, 2020 | 1 | 2:43 | Las Vegas, Nevada, United States | |
| Loss | 11–5 | Merab Dvalishvili | Decision (unanimous) | UFC on ESPN: Eye vs. Calvillo | June 13, 2020 | 3 | 5:00 | Las Vegas, Nevada, United States | Catchweight (140 lb) bout. |
| Win | 11–4 | Joey Ruquet | KO (punch) | Combate 42 | August 23, 2019 | 1 | 1:45 | Lake Tahoe, Nevada, United States | Defended the CAMMA Bantamweight Championship. |
| Win | 10–4 | José Alday | TKO (punches) | Combate 33 | March 29, 2019 | 1 | 2:19 | Tucson, Arizona, United States | Won the CAMMA Bantamweight Championship |
| Win | 9–4 | Vicente Marquez | Submission (shoulder choke) | Combate 29 | December 7, 2018 | 1 | 0:50 | Fresno, California, United States | Featherweight bout. |
| Loss | 8–4 | José Alday | Decision (split) | Combate 24 | September 14, 2018 | 3 | 5:00 | Phoenix, Arizona, United States | For the vacant CAMMA Bantamweight Championship. |
| Loss | 8–3 | Andre Ewell | KO (punch) | KOTC: Energetic Pursuit | February 24, 2018 | 1 | 4:44 | Ontario, California, United States | |
| Win | 8–2 | Chris Dempsey | Submission (armbar) | ExciteFight: Conquest of the Cage | June 10, 2017 | 1 | 1:19 | Airway Heights, Washington, Washington | |
| Win | 7–2 | Steve Swanson | Submission (guillotine choke) | Combate Americas 10 | January 19, 2017 | 1 | 2:34 | Mexico City, Mexico | |
| Loss | 6–2 | John Castañeda | TKO (punches) | Combate Americas 9 | October 14, 2016 | 4 | 2:24 | Verona, New York, United States | For the vacant Combate Bantamweight Championship. Castañeda missed weight (137.5 lb) and was ineligible to win the title. |
| Win | 6–1 | Saul Elizondo | TKO (punches) | Combate 7 | May 9, 2016 | 2 | 4:07 | Los Angeles, California, United States | |
| Win | 5–1 | Joey Ruquet | Submission (rear-naked choke) | Combate Americas: Road to the Championship 2 | December 16, 2015 | 2 | 4:06 | Hollywood, California, United States | Featherweight bout. |
| Win | 4–1 | Mauricio Diaz | Decision (unanimous) | Combate Americas: Road to the Championship 1 | September 17, 2015 | 3 | 5:00 | Las Vegas, Nevada, United States | |
| Win | 3–1 | Sean Cantor | Submission (rear-naked choke) | Bellator 2014 Monster Energy Cup | October 18, 2014 | 1 | 4:39 | Whitney, Nevada, United States | |
| Win | 2–1 | Dylan Atkinson | TKO (punches) | CageSport 25 | July 6, 2013 | 2 | 1:12 | Tacoma, Washington, United States | Bantamweight debut. |
| Loss | 1–1 | Kasey White | Decision (unanimous) | CageSport 24 | April 27, 2013 | 3 | 5:00 | Tacoma, Washington, United States | Featherweight debut. |
| Win | 1–0 | Jorey Taylor | TKO (punches) | CageSport 20 | July 14, 2012 | 1 | 1:47 | Tacoma, Washington, United States | Catchweight (140 lb) bout. |

== See also ==
- List of male mixed martial artists
