= David Isaac (disambiguation) =

David Isaac, Baron Isaac is a British solicitor, life peer and provost of Worcester College, Oxford.

David Isaac may also refer to:

- David Isaac (musician), guitarist and producer of Marcus Miller albums, such as Marcus
- David Isaac, Michigan candidate of United States House of Representatives elections, 1980
- David Isaac, co-songwriter of "Way to Go!"
- David Isaac, creator of British television series, Lunch Monkeys

== See also ==
- David Isaacs (disambiguation)
