= A7FL =

American seven-man gridiron football league

- Classification: Semi-professional
- Sport: American football
- Founded: 2014
- First season: 2015
- CEO: Sener Korkusuz
- President: Ryan DePaul
- Motto: "The Game America Wants"
- No. of teams: 10
- Country: United States
- Most recent champion: Trenton BIC (3rd title) (2025)
- Most titles: Paterson U, Trenton BIC (3 titles)
- Broadcasters: DAZN; Fox Soul; Stadium (sports network); Triller TV
- Sponsor: Cricket Wireless
- Website: A7FL.com

The American 7s Football League (A7FL) is a sports league in the United States which plays a seven-man version of gridiron football called American 7s Football. Launched in 2015, its games are played without football helmets or other protective equipment.

League players are not paid during the season and most of them are primarily amateurs. Instead cash prizes are awarded to division and national champs (divided among the roster of roughly 25 players). For the 2022 season the prize pool was $50,000.

== History ==
Founded in 2014 with play commencing the following year, the A7FL plays a seven-game schedule running from March to May, with playoffs running from June to July. It can trace its history to a New York metropolitan area league called Town Beef that started in 2008 and played 7-on-7 full-contact football with no helmets or pads. North Jersey remains one of the two nuclei around which the A7FL's teams are based, the other being the Las Vegas Valley.

The league primarily attracts semi-professional football players seeking opportunities to stay in shape during spring. In 2016, the league participated in a safety study led by the New Jersey Institute of Technology.

In 2023, the league had its first former NFL starter sign with a team, that being cornerback Dominique Rodgers-Cromartie, who signed with the Tampa Nightcrawlers.

== Differences from other leagues ==
A7FL players play without pads or helmets as part of what the league describes as an effort to reduce the potential of head injuries resulting from helmet-to-helmet contact. League games also do not include kickoffs, field goals, or punts, and, instead of the kickoff, implement a unique version of special teams called a 3-on-1 throw off (three 'throwing' players and one receiver). Games are played on narrow fields of 37 yards' width (34 m, between one set of hash marks and the furthest sideline away) to accommodate fewer players on the field on each team. A7FL games are played between two seven-man teams; teams are, additionally, required to cap their rosters at 35 active players.

== Teams ==
Teams that will participate in the 2026 season.

Team	City
Eastern Conference
East Orange Renegades	East Orange, New Jersey
Paterson U	Paterson, New Jersey
Silk City Animals	Paterson, New Jersey
Trenton BIC (Brothers in Christ)	Trenton, New Jersey
Lexington Phantoms	Lexington, Kentucky
Virginia Heathens	Fredericksburg, Virginia
Western Conference
Las Vegas Insomniacs	Henderson, Nevada
Las Vegas Sickwidit	Henderson, Nevada
Silver State Stealth	Henderson, Nevada
Vegas Hunters	Henderson, Nevada

== Championship results ==
Season	Date	Champions		Runners-Up		Site
2015	June 27, 2015	Paterson U	38	Union City Chiefs	6	St. John Vianney High School
2016	June 24, 2016	Trenton BIC	32	Union City Chiefs	26	St. John Vianney High School
2017	July 9, 2017	Union City Chiefs	28	PA Immortalz	26	Palisades Credit Union Park
2018	July 8, 2018	Baltimore Gators	28	Baltimore Vikings	14	Baltimore, MD
2019	July 14, 2019	PA Immortalz	25	Paterson U	19	Sylvester Land Memorial Field
2020	August 23, 2020	Paterson U	49	Old Bridge Hawks	7	St. John Vianney High School
2021	July 18, 2021	Paterson U	47	Trenton BIC	41	Asbury Park High School
2022	July 10, 2022	Trenton BIC	32	Paterson U	30	Asbury Park High School
2023	July 23, 2023	Las Vegas Insomniacs	50	Tampa Nightcrawlers	46	Anderson Auto Group Fieldhouse (Bullhead City, AZ)
2024	July 21, 2024	Las Vegas Insomniacs	31	Trenton BIC	30	Asbury Park High School
2025	June 22, 2025	Trenton BIC	53	Las Vegas Insomniacs	39	The Dome (Jackson, NJ)
2026	May 31, 2026	Las Vegas Insomniacs	52	Trenton BIC	26	Canyon Springs High School (North Las Vegas, Nevada)

== Media coverage ==
Eleven Sports Network acquired the exclusive United States and international rights to broadcast the A7FL 2017 Championship on July 9, 2017, played at Palisades Credit Union Park. Through Eleven Sports Network's distribution with DirecTV, Verizon FiOS, and AT&T uVerse the A7FL 2017 Championship was to be accessible by over 70 million homes worldwide. In 2018, Eleven Sports Network acquired the exclusive United States and international rights to broadcast a 21-game package including the playoffs and championship, and in 2019, the non-exclusive U.S. and international rights to the playoffs and championship.

In 2019, Twitch acquired the exclusive United States and international rights to a 21-game package of the season including the playoffs and championship. In 2020, A7FL again partnered with Eleven Sports Network for the exclusive United States and international rights of the season, including the playoffs and championship.

For 2021, FITE TV acquired the United States and international rights to the A7FL's season including the playoffs and championship. Starting in 2022, select Games of the Week -- including the playoffs and championship - were broadcast on Stadium (sports network), YouTube, DAZN, and A7FL.tv.

In 2025, select A7FL Games of the Week including the playoffs and championship and A7FL InMotion, a weekly 30 minute show featuring a look inside the A7FL -- are broadcast on Fox Soul, Stadium (sports network), DAZN, Triller TV, YouTube, and A7FL.tv.

== Organization ==
The CEO of the A7FL is Sener Korkusuz and its president is Ryan DePaul.

In 2019, UFC co-founder David Isaacs joined the A7FL to serve as chairman of the advisory board. Isaacs said, "Removing equipment to make any sport safer seems counterintuitive and we faced similar issues when we launched the UFC and created the sport of mixed martial arts. With the A7FL, football can be safer but still thrilling full-contact competition. I can't wait to get started."

Athletes playing in the A7FL are required to sign a player injury waiver and be 18 years of age or older.

== See also ==
- Rugby sevens
