= Combate Global =

Mixed martial arts media company

- Formerly: Combate Americas (2011–2021)
- Type: Private
- Industry: Mixed martial arts
- Founded: 2011
- Founder: Campbell McLaren
- Headquarters: New York City, New York
- Area served: United States; Mexico; Brazil; Other Latin American countries
- Key people: Campbell McLaren, CEO; Joe Plumeri, Chairman of the Board; Lawrence Kahm, Chief Financial Officer; Mike Afromowitz, EVP Fight Ops & Communication
- Products: Television; Films; Merchandise; Streaming network service Home video Live events
- Website: https://www.combateglobal.com

Combate Global (formerly known as Combate Americas) is an Hispanic American mixed martial arts (MMA) promotion company founded in 2011 by current-CEO Campbell McLaren and based in New York City, New York. Its business encompasses live events, television broadcasts, and mobile content catering to a millennial audience; with the average age of viewers being 27. In 2024, Combate Global was ranked by Forbes as the tenth most valuable combat sports organization in the world, with an estimated value of $120 million.

== History ==
In December 2013, Mun2 greenlit a reality competition series called Combate Americas to air in 2014. The series would feature ten fighters in two weight classes competing for a chance to win an exclusive contract with the promotion. Founder and CEO Campbell McLaren has said that the company “was specifically created to present the best new Hispanic fighters and to introduce a whole new audience to this highly entertaining sport.”

Chino y Nacho hosted the series, while Daddy Yankee served as the first commissioner of Combate. The series culminated with Ismael Leon being crowned the featherweight champion, and Danny Morales winning the welterweight bracket.

Combate Americas was the winner of the Imagen Award for “Best Reality or Variety Series”. The show also won the 2014 Cable Fax Award for "Best Show or Series Reality/Competition/Game Show".

In 2017, Trenton Thunder Co-owner Joe Plumeri became the non-Executive Chairman of the board.

In 2018, Combate announced a live Programming Agreement with Univision Deportes. “Combate ESTRELLAS I” and “Combate ESTRELLAS II”, respectively broadcast on Friday, April 13 and Friday, April 20, would be the first live televised MMA events to air on the main Univision broadcast network and Univision Deportes.

“Combate ESTRELLAS I” delivered a total of 583,000 persons 2+, including 296,000 adults in the coveted 18-49 age group, on the Univision and Univision Deportes Network simulcast. The broadcast drew a bigger audience than Bellator 197, which aired in primetime on Paramount Network. The Facebook LIVE stream of the Combate ESTRELLAS I preliminary card delivered over 294,000 streams. In Mexico, the event delivered over 4 million live broadcast television viewers on Azteca 7. Airing exclusively on UDN in the midnight ET slot the following Friday, April 20, “Combate ESTRELLAS II” delivered another 200,000 total viewers, a 10 percent increase from the first installment of the two-part, “Combate ESTRELLAS” live event series. Of the total UDN viewers for “Combate ESTRELLAS II,” 67 percent were in the 18-49 age group. The Facebook LIVE stream garnered over 630,000 streams, more than doubling the online audience from ESTRELLAS I.

=== Rebranding and further television deals ===
In March 2021, Combate Americas announced a five-year broadcasting partnership with Univision, with a plan to produce 150 televised events. It was also announced the organization would be branded as Combate Global going forward. In June of that year, Combate Global announced that CBS Sports, through CBS Sports Network and Paramount Plus, would become the English language home for Combate Global. After increased ratings, Univision Communications bought a significant equity stake in Combate Global the following month.

In 2024, Combate's English language programming moved exclusively Fuse Media's namesake cable channel. In addition, Combate Global's library content would begin streaming on the company's El Rey Rebel FAST channel.

== List of events ==
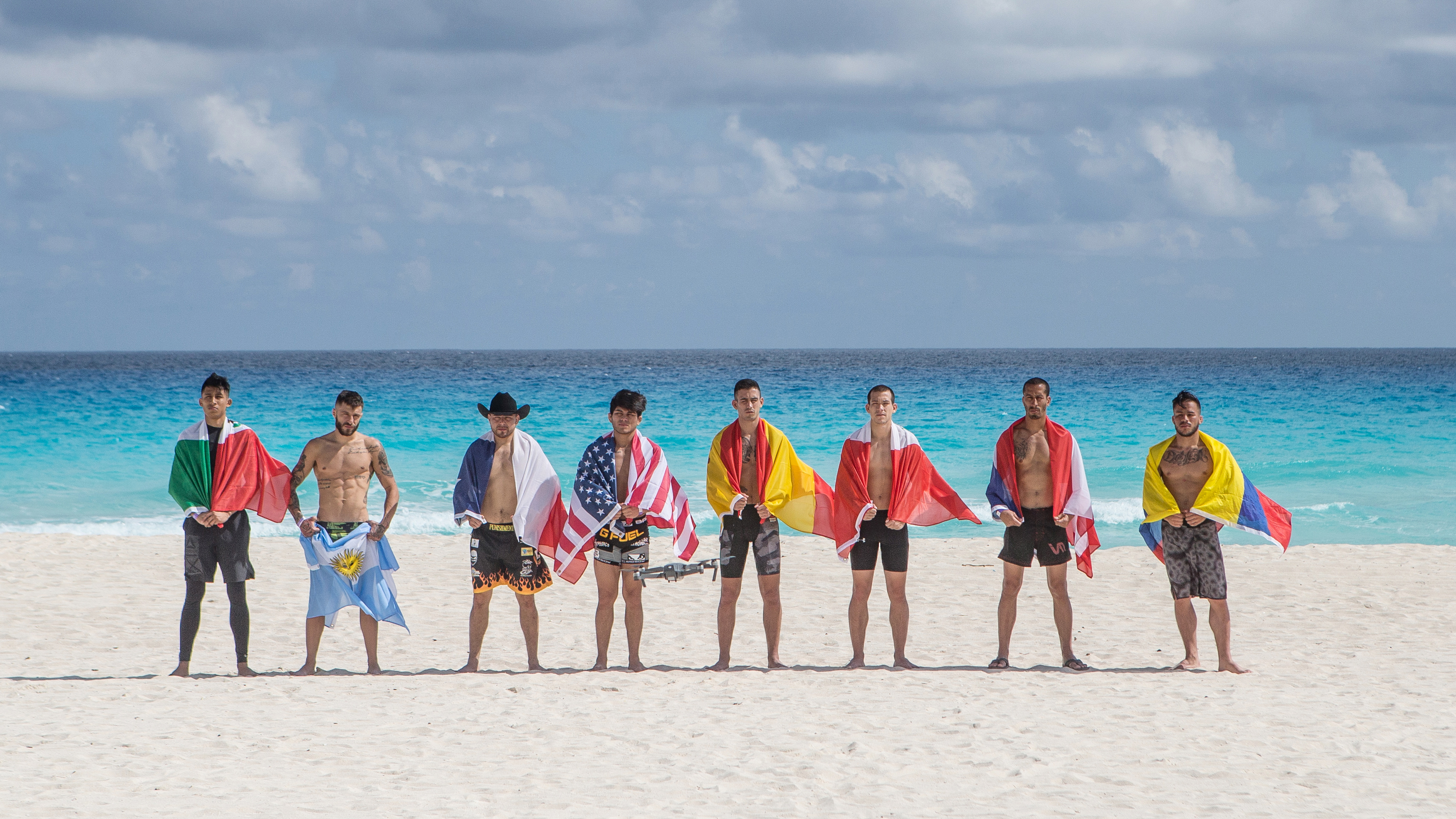
Fighters on a Beach

Combate Americas: Level vs. Arzeno

December 12, 2013 - Magic City Casino, Miami, Florida, United States

Main Event: Rene Martinez vs. Alan Arzeno

Combate Americas: Alvarez vs Patterson

September 17, 2015 - The D Casino, Las Vegas, Nevada, United States

Main Event: Gustavo Lopez vs. Mauricio Diaz

Fighters	Method
Gustavo Lopez (W) vs. Mauricio Diaz	Decision (Unanimous)
Jay Pressley (W) vs. Irvin Veloz	Decision (Unanimous)
Ricardo Palacios (W) vs. Benji Gómez	KO (Head Kick)
Kyra Batara (W) vs. Nicdali Rivera-Calanoc	Decision (Unanimous)
John Castaneda (W) vs. Justin Governale	Decision (Unanimous)
Justin Patterson (W) vs. Ozzie Alvarez	Decision (Unanimous)
Erick Sanchez (W) vs. Rudy Morales	Submission (Rear-Naked Choke)
Carlos Garcia (W) vs. Luis Carmona	Decision (Unanimous)

Combate Americas: Hollywood

December 16, 2015 - Florentine Gardens, Hollywood, California, United States

Main Event: John Castañeda vs. Federico Lopez

Fighters	Method
Gustavo Lopez (W) vs. Joey Ruquet	Submission (Arm-Triangle Choke)
Ramos Cruz (W) vs. Jonathan Santa Maria	Decision (Split)
Nick Piedmont (W) vs. Emilio Chavez	Decision (Unanimous)
Ricardo Palacios (W) vs. Anthony Paredes	Decision (Split)
Kyra Batara (W) vs. Liz McCarthy	TKO (Punches)
John Castaneda (W) vs. Federico Lopez	Submission (Arm-Triangle Choke)
Izic Fernandez (W) vs. Israel Cruz	KO (Punch)

Combate 5

April 18, 2016 - The Exchange, Los Angeles, California, USA

Main Event: Erick Sanchez vs. Mike Segura

Fighters	Method
Marcos Gonzalez (W) vs. George Burton	TKO (Punches)
Richard Louie Bowen Rojo Jr. (W) vs. Michael Reyes	Submission (Guillotine Choke)
Jose Estrada (W) vs. Jonathan Quiroz	KO (Punch)
Kyle Estrada (W) vs. Jonathan Santa Maria	TKO (Elbows)
Adam Calderon (W) vs. Kevin Vazquez	Decision (Unanimous)
Emilio Chavez (W) vs. Angel Luis Cruz	Technical Submission (Rear-Naked Choke)
Jonathan Martinez (W) vs. Jesse Cruz	Submission (Armbar)
Erick Sanchez (W) vs. Mike Segura	Submission (Rear-Naked Choke)

Combate 6

April 26, 2016 - The Exchange, Los Angeles, California, United States

Main Event: John Castaneda vs. Gabriel Solorio

Fighters	Method
Yoandy Carrillo (W) vs. George Hernández	TKO (Punches)
Joey Ruquet (W) vs. Luke Faultersack	Submission (Anaconda Choke)
Christian Gonzalez (W) vs. Hector Saldana	TKO (Punches)
Heinrich Wassmer (W) vs. Ramos Cruz	Submission (Armbar)
Paola Ramirez (W) vs. Amber Tackett	TKO (Superman Punch)
Marcos Bonilla (W) vs. Rudy Morales	Decision (Unanimous)
Kyra Batara (W) vs. Jenny Silvero	TKO (Punches)
John Castaneda (W) vs. Gabriel Solorio	Decision (Split)
Erick Gonzalez (W) vs. Victor Martinez	Decision (Split)
Adin Duenas (W) vs. Oliver Vazquez	Decision (Unanimous)
Tony Lopez (W) vs. Shannon Ritch	Submission (Guillotine Choke)

Combate 7

May 9, 2016 - The Exchange, Los Angeles, California, United States

Main Event: Ricky Palacios vs. Brandon Royval

Fighters	Method
Angel Oliveras (W) vs. Benji Gomez	Decision (Unanimous)
Joe Vidales (W) vs. Darrio Mobley	TKO (Punches)
Mauricio Diaz (W) vs. Cristobal Chavez-Davila	Decision (Unanimous)
Jacob Rosales (W) vs. Andrew Lagadaan	Decision (Unanimous)
Gustavo Lopez (W) vs. Saul Elizondo	TKO (Punches)
Ray Rodriguez (W) vs. Art Arciniega	Decision (Split)
Paulina Granados (W) vs. Stephanie Alba	Decision (Split)
Ricky Palacios (W) vs. Brandon Royval	Decision (Unanimous)

Combate 8

August 11, 2016 - The Exchange, Los Angeles, California, United States

Main Event: John Castaneda vs. Angel Cruz

Fighters	Method	Round	Time
Hakob Ter-Petrosyan (W) vs. George Hernandez	TKO (Punches)	2	0:00
Daniel Rodriguez (W) vs. Hector Saldana	Submission (Arm Triangle Choke)	1	3:45
John Castaneda (W) vs. Angel Cruz	TKO (Punches)	2	2:25
Danny Martinez (W) vs. Benjamin Vinson	Decision (Unanimous)	3	5:00
Benji Gomez (W) vs. Heinrich Wassmer	Decision (Split)	3	5:00
Albert Tapia (W) vs. Jonathan Santa Maria	Decision (Majority)	3	5:00
Marcos Bonilla (W) vs. Izic Fernandez	Decision (Split)	3	5:00
Jose Estrada (W) vs. Christian Cardona	KO (Punches)	1	2:34
Erick Gonzalez (W) vs. Yoandy Carrillo	TKO (Punches)	2	3:13
Jonathan Quiroz (W) vs. Ryan Lilley	Decision (Unanimous)	3	5:00

Combate 9: Empire Rising

October 14, 2016 - Turning Stone Resort Casino, Verona, New York, United States

Main Event: John Castaneda vs. Gustavo Lopez

Fighters	Method	Round	Time
John Castaneda (W) vs. Gustavo Lopez	TKO (Punches)	4	2:24
Julian Marquez (W) vs. Matt Hamill	TKO (Punches)	1	1:22
Marc Stevens (W) vs. Victor Reyna	Decision (Unanimous)	3	5:00
Jose Ceja (W) vs. Irwin Rivera	KO (Punches)	1	4:22
Paulina Granados (W) vs. Jenna Serio	Decision (Unanimous)	3	5:00
James Rodriguez (W) vs. Alex Henry	Submission (Rear Naked Choke)	1	2:03
Matt Almy (W) vs. Freddy Arteaga	TKO (Kick to the Body Punches	1	2:59

Combate 10

January 19, 2017 - El Plaza Condesa, Mexico City, Federal District, Mexico

Main Event: Gustavo Lopez vs. Steve Swanson

Fighters	Method	Round	Time
Christofer Ramirez (W) vs. Heriberto Tovar	TKO (Punches)	3	3:16
Alex Velasco (W) vs. Julio Cesar Cruz	Submission (Guillotine Choke)	2	0:47
Gustavo Lopez (W) vs. Steve Swanson	Submission (Guillotine Choke)	1	2:34
Lisbeth Lopez Silva (W) vs. Nicdali Rivera-Calanoc	Submission (Rear-Naked Choke)	1	3:07
Joey Ruquet (W) vs. Jose Ceja	Technical Submission (Rear-Naked Choke)	2	1:47
Mark Delarosa (W) vs. Ivan Hernandez Flores	Submission (Arm-Triangle Choke)	2	3:11
Marco Antonio Elpidio (W) vs. Rodrigo Vargas	Decision (Split)	3	5:00
Rafa Garcia (W) vs. Raul Najera Ocampo	Submission (Heel Hook)	1	1:04
Enrique Barragan (W) vs. Kevin Garcia	TKO (Punches)	2	0:48

Combate 11

February 16, 2017 - Burbank, California, United States

Main Event: Danny Ramirez vs. Erick Gonzalez

Fighters	Method	Round	Time
Albert Tapia (W) vs. Benji Gomez	Decision (Split)	3	5:00
Heinrich Wassmer (W) vs. Heber Castillo	Submission (Armbar)	1	4:57
Alyssa Garcia (W) vs. Kaiyana Rain	Decision (Split)	3	5:00
Danny Ramirez (W) vs. Erick Gonzalez	Decision (Unanimous)	3	5:00
Jose Estrada (W) vs. George Hernandez	Submission (Rear-Naked Choke)	1	2:09
Andres Quintana (W) vs. Erick Sanchez	Decision (Unanimous)	3	5:00
Rudy Morales (W) vs. Izic Fernandez	Decision (Unanimous)	3	5:00
Javier Garcia (W) vs. Donte Stubbs	Submission (Rear-Naked Choke)	3	0:58

Combate 12

March 30, 2017 - Fausto Gutierrez Moreno Municipal Auditorium, Tijuana, Baja California, Mexico

Main Event: Marcelo Rojo vs. Ivan Hernandez Flores

Fighters	Method	Round	Time
Alex Velasco (W) vs. Christofer Ramirez	Decision (Split)	3	5:00
Levy Saul Marroquin Salazar (W) vs. Pablo Sabori	Decision (Split)	3	5:00
Irving Hernandez (W) vs. Jose Alday	TKO (Doctor Stoppage)	2	5:00
Marcelo Rojo (W) vs. Ivan Hernandez Flores	TKO	1	2:06
Alejandro Flores (W) vs. Walter Zamora	Decision (Split)	3	5:00
Erick Gonzalez (W) vs. Marco Antonio Elpidio	Decision (Split)	3	5:00
Ramon Lopez (W) vs. Marcos Bonilla	Decision (Unanimous)	3	5:00
Jose Aguayo (W) vs. Gilberto Santos	Submission	1	2:23
Christian Giovannie (W) vs. Angel Gonzalez	Submission	3	1:12
Edgar Chairez (W) vs. Oscar Quintero	Submission	1	1:19

Combate 13

April 20, 2017 - Casino Del Sol Resort, Tucson, Arizona, United States

Main Event: Ricky Palacios vs. Roman Salazar

Fighters	Method	Round	Time
Ricky Palacios (W) vs. Roman Salazar	Decision (Split)	3	5:00
Kevin Natividad (W) vs. Chad Dietmeyer	Submission (Rear-Naked Choke)	1	4:23
Daniel Rodriguez (W) vs. Joel Champion	TKO (Punches)	1	1:55
Erick Sanchez (W) vs. Randy Steinke	Decision (Split)	3	5:00
Victor Reyna (W) vs. Andrew Perez	TKO (Punches)	1	1:53
Jose Palencia Jr. (W) vs. Justin Rascon	Decision (Unanimous)	3	5:00
Arturo Guzman (W) vs. Robert Caspar	Decision (Split)	3	5:00
Alesha Zappitella (W) vs. Stephanie Alba	Decision (Unanimous)	3	5:00
Levi Escobar (W) vs. Cedric Katambwa	Decision (Unanimous)	3	3:00
Francisco Rodriguez (W) vs. Jeremiah Garber	Decision (Unanimous)	3	3:00

Combate 14

May 5, 2017 - Ventura County Fairgrounds, Ventura, California, United States

Main Event: Emilio Chavez vs. Jose Estrada

Fighters	Method	Round	Time
Michael Reyes (W) vs. Benji Gomez	Submission (Rear-Naked Choke)	3	1:09
Ralph Acosta (W) vs. Ryan Lilley	Submission (Rear-Naked Choke)	1	3:45
Joseph Henle (W) vs. Joe Vidales	Submission (Shoulder Choke)	1	1:15
Hakop Ter-Petrosyan (NC) vs. Emilio Williams (NC)	NC (Accidental Knee to the Groin)	1	2:58
Austin Wilson (W) vs. Bruno Machado	Decision (Unanimous)	3	5:00
Heinrich Wassmer (W) vs. Freddy Arteaga	Decision (Unanimous)	3	5:00
Emilio Chavez (W) vs. Jose Estrada	Submission (Rear-Naked Choke)	1	1:29
Jose Estrada (W) vs. Christian Cardona	KO (Punches)	1	2:34
John Castaneda (W) vs. Chris Beal	TKO (Punches)	2	0:42
Sheila Padilla (W) vs. Alyssa Garcia	Submission (Armbar)	1	2:47
Joshua Jones (W) vs. James Pou	TKO (Punches)	2	4:21

Combate 15

June 30, 2017 - Sala De Armas, Mexico City, Federal District, Mexico

Main Event: Rodrigo Vargas vs. Danny Ramirez

Fighters	Method	Round	Time
Antonio Suarez (W) vs. Christian David Lopez	Submission (Rear-Naked Choke)	1	3:36
Edgar Chairez (W) vs. Erick Villaluz	Submission (Armbar)	1	0:18
Raul Najera Ocampo (W) vs. Mauro Dominguez	Submission (Rear-Naked Choke)	2	4:25
Rodrigo Vargas (W) vs. Danny Ramirez	Decision (Unanimous)	3	5:00
Andres Quintana (W) vs. Levy Saul Marroquin Salazar	Decision (Unanimous)	3	5:00
Mark Delarosa (W) vs. Mahatma Chit-Bala Garcia Avalos	Submission (Rear-Naked Choke)	3	2:36
Marco Antonio Elpidio (W) vs. Jose Luis Verdugo	Decision (Unanimous)	3	5:00
Melissa Martinez (W) vs. Yajaira Romo	KO (Head Kick)	2	2:45
Antonio Ramirez (W) vs. Federico Betancourt	Submission (Rear-Naked Choke)	2	2:12
Ramon Lopez (W) vs. Miguel Angel Cabrera	TKO (Knee and Punches)	1	4:59

Combate 16: Combate Clásico

July 27, 2017 - Mana Wynwood Convention Center, Miami, Florida, United States

Main Event: Ricky Palacios vs. Chris Avila

Fighters	Method	Round	Time
Ricky Palacios (W) vs. Chris Avila	Decision (Unanimous)	3	5:00
Marcelo Rojo (W) vs. Billy Molina	TKO (Punches)	1	4:50
Kyra Batara (W) vs. Vanessa Rico Fernandez	Submission (Armbar)	2	3:46
Alberto Montes (W) vs. Jonathan Quiroz	Decision (Unanimous)	3	5:00
Ozzie Alvarez (W) vs. Anderson Melo	Decision (Unanimous)	3	5:00
Joey Ruquet (W) vs. Vinney Pantaleon	Decision (Unanimous)	3	5:00
Irwin Rivera (W) vs. Chino Duran	Decision (Unanimous)	3	5:00
Rafael Alves (W) vs. Rudy Morales	Decision (Unanimous)	3	5:00
Gustavo Trujillo (W) vs. Wesley Cantillo	TKO (Punches)	2	4:18

Combate 17: El Grito En La Jaula

September 15, 2017 - Splash Kingdom Amphitheater, Redlands, California, United States

Main Event: Jose Estrada vs. Izic Fernandez

Fighters	Method	Round	Time
Jose Estrada (W) vs. Izic Fernandez	TKO Punches	1	3:59
Brenda Enriquez (W) vs. Shyann Farmer	Decision (Unanimous)	3	5:00
Alberto Trujillo (W) vs. Heber Castillo	Decision (Unanimous)	3	5:00
Ralph Acosta (W) vs. Gareth De La Cruz	Submission (Rear Naked Choke)	1	2:28
David Duran (W) vs. Michael Reyes	Decision (Split)	3	5:00
Angel Gonzalez (W) vs. Julio Aguilera	Decision (Unanimous)	3	5:00
Alex Thompson (W) vs. Santiago Diaz	KO	1	4:42
Javier Garcia (W) vs. Austin Wilson	Submission (Armbar)	2	3:51
Rafa Garcia (W) vs. Marcos Bonilla	Submission (Armbar)	2	1:07

Combate 18: Copa Combate

November 11, 2017 - Grand Oasis Cancún, Quintana Roo, México

Copa Combate Tournament

Fighters	Method
Felipe "Pipe" Vargas (W) vs. Víctor Madrigal (alternate bout)	Decision (Split)
Marcelo Rojo (W) vs. Mike Erosa	Submission (Armbar)
Levy Saúl Marroquín (W) vs. Carlos Rivera	Decision (Unanimous)
John Castaneda (W) vs. Kevin Moreyra	Submission (Rear-naked choke)
Marc Gómez (W) vs. Alejandro Abomohor	Decision (Unanimous)
Levy Saúl Marroquín (W) vs. Marcelo Rojo	Submission (Guillotine Choke)
John Castaneda (W) vs. Marc Gómez	Decision (Unanimous)
Levy Saúl Marroquín (W) vs. John Castaneda	Decision (Unanimous)

Extra Fights

Fighters	Method	Round	Time
Lisbeth Lopez Silva (W) vs. Sheila Padilla	TKO (Punches and Elbows)	2	0:24
Melissa Martinez (W) vs. Gloria Bravo	TKO (Kicks and Punches)	1	4:18

Combate 19: Queen Warriors

December 1, 2017 - Freeman Coliseum, San Antonio, Texas, United States

Main Event: Kyra Batara vs. Paulina Granados

Fighters	Method	Round	Time
Jesse Almaraz (W) vs. Fernando Rodríguez	Decision (Unanimous)	3	5:00
Federico Olivera (W) vs. David Miramontes	KO	1	0:10
Javier Obregon (W) vs. José Ceja	Submission (Rear-naked Choke)	2	2:51
Juan Deantes (W) vs. Heinrich Wassmer	Submission (Armbar)	1	1:36
DJ Fuentes (W) vs. Joel Scott	Decision (Unanimous)	3	5:00
Ray Rodríguez (W) vs. Michael Rodríguez	KO	1	3:16
Vanesa Rico (W) vs. Brenda Enriquez	Decision (Unanimous)	3	5:00
Víctor Reyna (W) vs. Daniel Rodríguez	Decision (Split)	3	5:00
Andrés Quintana (W) vs. Rey Trujillo	Submission (Rear-naked choke)	2	1:52
Kyra Batara (W) vs. Paulina Granados	Decision (Unanimous)	3	5:00

Combate 20: Estrellas I

April 13, 2018 - The Shrine, Los Angeles, California, United States

Main Event: José “Pochito” Alday vs. John “Sexi Mexi” Castaneda

Fighters	Method	Round	Time
José Alday (W) vs. John Castaneda	Decision (Split Decision)	3	5:00
Amanda Serrano vs. Corina Herrera	Decision (Draw)	3	5:00
Jose Estrada (W) vs. Rudy Morales	TKO	2	1:43
Rafa García (W) vs. Chase Gibson	Majority Decision	3	5:00
Erick Gonzalez (W) vs. Danny Ramirez	TKO	1	3:15
Gabriel Green (W) vs. Javier García	Submission (Rear-Naked Choke)	3	1:03
Mikey Reyes (W) vs. Heinrich Wassmer	Decision (Unanimous)	3	5:00
Joey Ruquet (W) vs. Keith Carson	Submission (Rear-Baked Choke)	1	4:18

Combate 21: Estrellas II

April 20, 2018 - Gimnasio Nuevo León, Monterrey, Mexico

Main Event: Érik "El Goyito" Pérez vs. DJ Fuentes

Fighters	Method	Round	Time
Érik Pérez (W) vs. DJ Fuentes	TKO	3	1:22
Marcelo Rojo (W) vs. Fabián Galván	TKO	1	2:34
Melissa Martínez (W) vs. Ivanna Martinenghi	Decision (Unanimous)	3	5:00
Alejandro Flores (W) vs. Víctor Madrigal	Decision (Unanimous)	3	5:00
Irene Cabello (W) vs. Lezly Hinojosa	TKO	2	2:16
Ricardo Arreola (W) vs. Iván Pérez	Decision (Split Decision)	3	5:00
Kevin García (W) vs. Juan Pablo González	Decision (Unanimous)	3	5:00
Óscar Suárez (W) vs. Enrique González	Submission (Rear-Naked Choke)	1	3:20
David Martínez (W) vs. Kike Barragán	KO	1	1:10
Daniel Zellhuber (W) vs. José Luis Medrano	Decision (Unanimous)	3	5:00

Combate 22: México vs. USA

May 11, 2018 - McClellan Conference Center, Sacramento, California, United States

Main Event: Anthony “The Shark” Avila vs. José Luis Verdugo

Fighters	Method	Round	Time
Anthony Ávila (W) vs. Jose Luis Verdugo	Decision (Unanimous)	3	5:00
Lisbeth Silva (W) vs. Brenda Enriquez	TKO	3	2:24
Horacio Gutiérrez (W) vs. Chris Avila	Decision (Unanimous)	3	5:00
Christian Giovannie (W) vs. Jose Loera	Decision (Unanimous)	3	5:00
Kaleio “K.O.” Romero (W) vs. Luis Vargas	Submission (Triangle Choke)	2	3:59
Roger Severson (W) vs. Andrew Coyne	Decision (Unanimous)	3	5:00
Jesse Strader (W) vs. José Aguayo	Decision (Unanimous)	3	5:00
Francis Hernández (W) vs. Shyann Farmer	Submission (Rear-Naked Choke)	2	2:12

Combate 23: México vs. El Mundo

May 18, 2018 - Auditorio Municipal, Tijuana, Baja C, Mexico

Main Event: Andres “The Bullet” Quintana vs. Marco Antonio “La Roca” Elpidio

Fighters	Method	Round	Time
Andres Quintana (W) vs. Marco Antonio Elpidio	Decision (Unanimous)	3	5:00
Eduardo Torres (W) vs. Kevin Amador	Submission (Verbal Submission)	3	1:26
Christian Quiñónez (W) vs. Vinicius De Oliveira	TKO (Doctor's Stoppage)	2	0:44
Jair “El Lupe” Pérez (W) vs. Jesús Blanco	Submission (Armbar)	1	4:15
Yajaira Romo (W) vs. Vanesa Rico	TKO	2	2:46
Daniel Rodríguez (W) vs. Alex Velasco	Submission (rear-naked choke)	3	2:41
Edgar Cháirez (W) vs. Alan Cantú	TKO	1	2:58
Rodrigo Vargas (W) vs. Mike De La Torre	KO	1	0:18
Georgina Almeraz (W) vs. Mireia García	Decision (Draw)	3	5:00

SEASON 2

Combate 24: Alday vs. Lopez (Championship Fight)

September 14 - Celebrity Theater, Phoenix, Arizona, United States

Main Event: Jose "El Pochito" Alday vs. Gustavo Lopez

Fighters	Method	Round	Time
Eduardo Alvarado Osuna (W) vs. Roman Salazar	TKO (Punches)	1	4:14
Jose Alday (W) vs. Gustavo Lopez	Decision (Split)	3	5:00
Tracy Cortez (W) vs. Karen Cedillo	TKO (Punches)	2	3:53
Jair “El Lupe” Pérez (W) vs. Jesús Blanco	Submission (armbar)	1	4:15
Yajaira Romo (W) vs. Vanesa Rico	TKO	2	2:46
Rafa Garcia (W) vs. LaRue Burley	KO (Punches)	1	2:26
Richard Palencia (W) vs. Federico David Olivera	Decision (Unanimous)	3	5:00
Yaotzin Meza (W) vs. Gilberto Aguilar	Submission (Rear-Naked Choke)	1	3:58
Michael Hamel (W) vs. Javier Reyes Rugeles	Decision (Unanimous)	3	3:58
Orlando Jimenez (W) vs. Joey Trevino	TKO (Punches)	1	3:21

Combate 25: Road to Copa Combate

September 28, 2018 - Walter Pyramid, Long Beach, California, United States

Main Event: Andres Quintana vs. Eric Gonzalez

Fighters	Method	Round	Time
Andres Quintana (W) vs. Eric Gonzalez	Submission (Rear-Naked Choke)	1	2:41
Melissa Martinez (W) vs. Francis Hernandez	TKO (Body Kick and Punches)	1	2:33
Alejandro Flores (W) vs. Pablo Sabori	Decision (Unanimous)	1	5:00
Gaston Reyno (W) vs. Carlos Ochoa	Submission (Rear-Naked Choke)	1	2:21
Michael Reyes (W) vs. Hugo Aranda	Submission (Rear-Naked Choke)	1	3:26
Daniel Rodriguez (W) vs. Ozzie Alvarez	TKO (Punches)	3	2:41
Dominic Clark (W) vs. Danny Ramirez	Decision (Unanimous)	3	5:00
David Duran (W) vs. Heinrich Wassmer	TKO (Punches)	3	0:27
Hunter Carlyle (W) vs. Brian Del Rosario	Submission (Rear-Naked Choke)	2	2:41
Keith Carson (W) vs. Oscar Suarez	Decision (Unanimous)	3	5:00

Combate 26: Mexico vs. USA

October 13, 2018 - Anselmo Valencia Amphitheater, Tucson, Arizona, United States

Main Event: Anthony Birchak vs. Adam Martinez

Fighters	Method	Round	Time
Anthony Birchak (W) vs. Adam Martinez	TKO (Punches)	1	:51
Amanda Serrano (W) vs. Erendira Ordonez	Submission (Rear-Naked Choke)	1	4:23
David Michaud (W) vs. Fernando Gonzalez Trevino	TKO (Body Kick and Punches)	2	1:07
Mario Bautista (W) vs. Juan Pablo Gonzalez	Decision (Unanimous)	3	5:00
Levi Escobar (W) vs. Joshua Valentin	Submission (Triangle Armbar)	2	2:49
Andrew Perez (W) vs. Paris Stanford	Decision (Split)	3	5:00
Kasey Tanner (W) vs. Arturo Guzman	Submission (Kneebar)	3	1:50
Joao Antonio Camilo Neto (W) vs. Joe Madrid	Decision (Unanimous)	3	5:00
Alim Muhammed (W) vs. Ivan Tena	Decision (Split)	3	3:00

Combate 27: La Batalla de Guadalajara

October 26, 2018 - Nissan Gymnastics Complex, Guadalajara, Jalisco, Mexico

Main Event: Victor Hugo Madrigal vs. Cristian Quinonez

Fighters	Method	Round	Time
Victor Hugo Madrigal (W) vs. Cristian Quinonez	Submission (Rear-Naked Choke)	3	2:14
Alitzel Mariscal (W) vs. Brenda Enriquez	Decision (Unanimous)	3	5:00
Marco Antonio Elpidio (W) vs. Enrique Marin	Decision (Unanimous)	3	5:00
Axel Osuna (W) vs. Edgar Chairez	Submission (Triangle Armbar)	2	3:57
Marcelo Rojo (W) vs. Jesse Strader	TKO (Knees and Punches)	1	4:13
Alejandro Martinez (W) vs. Jordan Beltran	Submission (Rear-Naked Choke)	2	1:09
Alejandro Solorzano (W) vs. Mike Villareal	TKO (Punches)	1	4:28
Leo Rodriguez (W) vs. Ramon Lopez	TKO (Punches)	2	3:37
Jose Alberto Martinez (W) vs. Luis Ceron	KO (Punches to the Body)	2	1:48
Mahatma Chit-Bala Garcia Avalos (W) vs. Federico Betancourt	Submission (Rear-Naked Choke)	2	2:19
Guillermo Torres (W) vs. Mario Tena	TKO (Punches)	1	4:55

Combate 28: Combate Monterrey

November 17, 2018 - Nuevo León Gymnasium, Monterrey, Nuevo León, Mexico

Main Event: Érik Pérez vs. Andres Ayala

Fighters	Method	Round	Time
Érik Pérez (W) vs. Andres Ayala	Submission (Rear-Naked Choke)	1	3:39
Yajaira Romo (W) vs. Irene Cabello Rivera	Decision (Unanimous)	3	5:00
Levy Marroquin (W) vs. Jose Estrada	Decision (Unanimous)	3	5:00
Ricardo Arreola (W) vs. Saul Cabrera Ordaz	Decision (Split)	3	5:00
Won Sik Park (W) vs. Jose Luis Medrano	KO (Flying Knee and Punches)	1	1:48
Ivan Perez Ruvalcaba (W) vs. Daniel Rico	Submission (Rear-Naked Choke)	2	4:03
Ivan Hernandez Flores (W) vs. Alessadro Costa	Decision (Split)	3	5:00
Dominic Clark (W) vs. Danny Ramirez	Decision (Unanimous)	3	5:00
Daniel Zellhuber (W) vs. Salvador Izar	TKO (Knee and Punches)	2	1:32
Alan Cantu Garcia (W) vs. Eduardo Alvarez Osuna	KO (Punch)	1	0:26
Jair Perez (W) vs. Tino Gilaranz	Decision (Split)	3	5:00

Combate 29: Copa Combate

December 7, 2018 - Save Mart Center, Fresno, California, United States

Main Event: Andres Quintana vs. Alejandro Flores

Fighters	Method	Round	Time
Andres Quintana (W) vs. Alejandro Flores	KO	1	2:05
Andres Quintana (W) vs. Bruno Cannetti	TKO	1	2:05
Alejandro Flores (W) vs. Pablo Villaseca	Decision (Unanimous)	3	5:00
Andres Quintana (W) vs. Marlon Gonzales	Decision (Unanimous)	3	5:00
Alejandro Flores (W) vs. John Bedoya	Submission (Choke)	1	3:03
Pablo Villaseca (W) vs. Daniel Requeijo	Decision (Split)	3	5:00
Bruno Cannetti (W) vs. Joey Ruquet	TKO	1	1:32
Gustavo Lopez (W) vs. Vicente Marquez	Submission (Choke)	1	0:50
Pablo Sabori (W) vs. Michael Irizarry	Decision (Unanimous)	3	5:00
Corina Herrera (W) vs. Maria Buzaglo	Submission (Choke)	2	4:01
James Porter (W) vs. Albert Gonzales	Decision (Unanimous)	3	5:00
Paul Elizondo Jr. (W) vs. Nathan Napolitano	Submission (Rear-Naked Choke)	2	3:52

Combate 30: Combate Baja

February 8, 2019 - Auditorio del Estado, Mexicali, Baja California, Mexico

Main Event: Rafa Garcia vs. Edgar Escarrega

Fighters	Method	Round	Time
Rafa Garcia (W) vs. Edgar Escarrega	Submission (Rear-Naked Choke)	2	1:07
Edgar Chairez (W) vs. Alejandro Salazar	Submission (Armbar)	1	3:12
Alex Velasco (W) vs. Javier Reyes Rugeles	TKO (Punches)	3	3:08
Antonio Marquez (W) vs. Christopher Ortega	TKO (Punches)	1	3:08
Cristian Perez (W) vs. Saul Cabrera	Submission (Rear- Naked Choke)	3	2:31
Carlos Ernesto Ochoa (W) vs. Christian Gonzalez	KO	1	:07
Santiago Monreal (W) vs. Heber Castillo	TKO (Ground and Pound)	1	2:07
Laura Huizar (W) vs. Dulce Hernandez	TKO (Body Kick)	1	2:29
Ernesto Ibarra (W) vs. Ramon Vizcarra	Decision (Unanimous)	3	5:00
Ramiro Jimenez (W) vs. Jesus Blanco	Submission (Rear-Naked Choke)	1	3:41

Combate 31: Mexico vs. USA

February 22, 2019 - Save Mart Center, Fresno, California, USA

Main Event: Daniel Rodriguez vs. Ivan Castillo

Fighters	Method	Round	Time
Daniel Rodriguez (W) vs. Ivan Castillo	TKO (Knee)	2	2:31
Zoila Frausto (W) vs. Jaimee Nievera	KO	1	1:52
Anthony Avila (W) vs. Pablo Sabori	Decision (Split)	3	5:00
Hector Fajardo (W) vs. Josa Avalos	Submission (Armbar)	2	2:04
Steven Bolinger (W) vs. Emilio Horta	Decision (Unanimous)	3	5:00
Adrian Guzman (W) vs. Ryan Reneau	TKO (Headkick to Ground and Pound)	2	:19
Marcus Gaines (W) vs. Ozzie Alvarez	Decision (Unanimous)	3	5:00

Combate 32: Mexico vs. Spain

March 8, 2019 - Arena Coliseo Guadalajara, Jalisco, Mexico

Main Event: Erick Gonzalez vs. Alejandro Martinez

Fighters	Method	Round	Time
Erick Gonzalez (W) vs. Alejandro Martinez	TKO (Ground and Pound)	1	3:45
Alitzel Mariscal (W) vs. Vanessa Rico	TKO (Strikes)	1	3:18
Ignacio Capella (W) vs. Alvaro Herrera	TKO (Punches)	1	2:59
Victor Hugo Madrigal (W) vs. Zebenzui Ruiz	TKO (Punches)	2	3:50
Axel Osuna (W) vs. Bosco Boyer	Submission (Armbar)	1	3:10
Alejandro Solorzano (W) vs. Jaime Arevalo	Decision (Unanimous)	3	5:00
Paulina Vargas (W) vs. Ere Ordonez	TKO (Punches)	2	1:39
Guillermo Torres (W) vs. Caleb Moctezuma	Decision (Unanimous)	3	5:00
Genaro Valdez (W) vs. Hilario Portales	TKO (Ground and Pound)	3	1:37
Erick Garibay (W) vs. Ulises Palomares	TKO (Kick to the Head)	1	2:54

Combate 33: Alday vs. Lopez 2 (Championship Fight)

March 29, 2019 - Casino del Sol, Tucson, Arizona, United States

Main Event: Jose Alday vs. Gustavo Lopez

Fighters	Method	Round	Time
Gustavo Lopez (W) vs. Jose Alday	TKO (Punches)	1	2:19
Marisol Ruelas (W) vs. Corrie Ward	Submission (Rear Naked Choke)	2	2:59
Eduardo Alvarado Osuna (W) vs. Andy Perez	Decision (Unanimous)	3	5:00
Michael Robertson (W) vs. Jacob Ortiz	Decision (Split)	3	5:00
Baataryn Azjavkhlan (W) vs. Alex Arredondo	DQ (Illegal Strikes)	1	1:54
Joao Antonio Camilo Neto (W) vs. Alberto Trujillo	Decision (Unanimous)	3	5:00

Combate 34: Combate Estrellas

April 12, 2019 - Arena Jose Sulaiman, Monterrey, Nuevo León, Mexico

Main Event: Alejandro Flores vs. Levy Marroquin

Fighters	Method	Round	Time
Alejandro Flores (W) vs. Levy Marroquin	Decision (Unanimous)	3	5:00
John Castaneda (W) vs. Marcelo Rojo	Submission (Triangle Choke)	3	2:37
Marco Antonio Elpidio (W) vs. Ricardo Arreola	Decision (Split)	3	5:00
Daniel Barez (W) vs. Ivan Hernandez-Flores	TKO	1	2:04
Ivan Perez (W) vs. Alejandro Gavidia	Decision (Unanimous)	3	5:00
Karen Cedillo (W) vs. Lizeth Rodríguez	Submission (Rear Naked Choke)	1	1:27
Fernando Gonzalez (W) vs. Juan Carlos Diaz	Submission (Rear Naked Choke)	1	2:02
Jair Pérez Derrota (W) vs. Abraham Canavati	Submission (Rear Naked Choke)	2	2:35

Combate 35: Combate Reinas

April 26, 2019 - Galen Center, Los Angeles, California, United States

Main Event: Melissa Martinez vs. Caroline Gallardo

Fighters	Method	Round	Time
Melissa Martinez (W) vs. Caroline Gallardo	KO (Knee and Punches)	2	0:50
Kyra Batara (W) vs. Francis Hernandez	Submission (Armbar)	2	2:55
Gloria Bravo (W) vs. Paulina Granados	Decision (Unanimous)	3	5:00
Yasmine Jauregui (W) vs. Daniela Espinosa	KO (Punches)	1	0:13
Erick Gonzalez (W) vs. Won Sik Park	TKO (Punches)	2	2:25
Jose Estrada (W) vs. Adrian Guzman	Submission (Rear Naked Choke)	2	1:30
Mickey Reyes (W) vs. Oscar Suarez	TKO (Punches)	2	4:41
Jesse Strader (W) vs. Michael Jackson	TKO (Punches)	2	4:41
Sidney Trillo (W) vs. Destiny Vasquez	KO (High Kick)	2	0:28
Lucero Acosto (W) vs. Nancy Nava	TKO (Punches)	2	0:51

Combate 36: Combate Stockton

May 10, 2019 - Stockton Center, Stockton, California, United States

Main Event: Erick Sanchez vs. Alex Velasco

Fighters	Method	Round	Time
Erick Sanchez (W) vs. Alex Velasco	Decision (Unanimous)	3	5:00
Hector Sandoval (W) vs. Jorge Calvo	Decision (Unanimous)	3	5:00
Irene Rivera (W) vs. Charisa Sigala	Decision (Split)	3	5:00
Jordan Mapa (W) vs. Tino Gilaranz	TKO (Doctor Stoppage)	1	5:00
Anthony Taylor (W) vs. Ryan Reneau	Decision (Unanimous)	3	5:00
Samuel Alvarez (W) vs. Ray Cervera	Submission (Rear Naked Choke)	1	1:35
Giovanni Sarran (W) vs. Eduardo Perez	Submission (North South Choke)	2	4:35
Camilo Mejia (W) vs. Andreu Mendoza	Decision (Split)	3	5:00
Victor Rico (W) vs. Michael Humphrey	TKO (Punches)	1	4:03
Joseph Kropschot (W) vs. Marcus Gaines	Submission (Rear Naked Choke)	2	3:13

Combate 37: Combate Peru

May 31, 2019 - Coliseo Manuel Bonilla, Miraflores, Peru

Main Event: Daniel Zellhuber vs. Geanfranco Cortez

Fighters	Method	Round	Time
Daniel Zellhuber (W) vs. Geanfranco Cortez	TKO (Punches)	3	1:32
Marlon Gonzales (W) vs. Pablo Villaseca	Decision (Split)	3	5:00
Maria Paula Buzaglo (W) vs. Alitzel Mariscal	Decision (Split)	3	5:00
Kevin Moreyra (W) vs. Bruno Pereira	TKO (Punches)	2	3:12
Eduardo Torres (W) vs. Rodrigo Vera	Decision (Unanimous)	3	5:00
Renzo Mendez (W) vs. Andres Ayala	TKO (Doctor Stoppage)	2	5:00
Vincente Vargas (W) vs. Zury Valenzuela	Decision (Unanimous)	3	5:00
David Martinez (W) vs. William Sanchez	TKO (Punches)	1	0:56
Jennifer Gonzalez (W) vs. Dana Zighelbolm Grau	Submission (Armbar)	1	1:23
Jose Ochoa (W) vs. Omar Torres	KO (Head Kick)	2	4:34

Combate 38: Combate Unbreakable

June 7, 2019 - Casino del Sol, Tucson, Arizona, United States

Main Event: Jose Alday vs. Juan Pablo Gonzalez

Fighters	Method	Round	Time
Jose Alday (W) vs. Juan Pablo Gonzalez	Decision (Unanimous)	3	5:00
Rafa Garcia (W) vs. Estevan Payan	Submission (Rear Naked Choke)	1	4:50
Yazmin Jauregui (W) vs. McKenna Mitchell	TKO (Doctor Stoppage)	2	5:00
Javier Torres (W) vs. Joel Champion	Submission (Triangle)	2	2:42
David Duran (W) vs. Andy Perez	Decision (Split)	3	5:00
Eduardo Alvarado Osuna (W) vs. Jose Luis Calvo	Decision (Split)	3	5:00
Justin Rascon (W) vs. Jesus Rivas	TKO (Doctor Stoppage)	2	5:00
Ivan Tena (W) vs. Dominick Tim	TKO (Strikes)	1	3:02

Combate 39: Combate Hidalgo

June 21, 2019 - State Farm Arena, Hidalgo, Texas, United States

Main Event: Ricky Palacios vs. Cooper Gibson

Fighters	Method	Round	Time
Cooper Gibson (W) vs. Ricky Palacios	Submission (Arm Triangle)	1	4:02
Enrique Gonzalez (W) vs. Alejandro Martinez	Decision (Split)	3	5:00
Desiree Yanez (W) vs. Paulina Vargas	Technical Submission (Injury)	3	1:54
Cee Jay Hamilton (W) vs. David Fuentes	Decision (Split)	3	5:00
Juan Gonzalez (W) vs. Elias Rodriguez	TKO (Punches)	2	3:01
Jose Flores (W) vs. Eduardo Bustillos Martinez	TKO (Injury)	1	0:40
Elias Urbina (W) vs. Carlos Martinez	Submission (Rear Naked Choke)	1	2:00
Isaac Matamoros (W) vs. Roy Sarabia	Submission (Rear Naked Choke)	1	2:20
Edmilson Freitas (W) vs. David Salazar	Submission (Rear Naked Choke)	1	0:44

Combate 40: Combate Fresno

August 2, 2019 - Save Mart Center, Fresno, California, United States

Main Event: Reina Cordoba vs. Zoila Frausto

Fighters	Method	Round	Time
Reina Cordoba (W) vs. Zoila Frausto	Submission (Armbar)	1	2:32
JC Llamas (W) vs. Ivan Castillo	TKO (Punches)	1	1:38
Jesse Strader (W) vs. Isaiah Batin-Gonzalez	KO (Punch)	1	1:56
Adrian Guzman (W) vs. Cesar Gonzalez	Decision (Unanimous)	3	5:00
Albert Gonzales (W) vs. Havier Pedroza	TKO (Punches)	1	4:53
Jose Alvalos (W) vs. Trey Branch	Submission (Rear Naked Choke)	1	1:59
Paul Elizondo (W) vs. Mike Tubera	Submission (Rear Naked Choke)	1	4:59
Dan Argueta (W) vs. Christian Hermosillo	Submission (Rear Naked Choke)	1	0:56
Daniel Oseguera (W) vs. Austin Liu	Decision (Unanimous)	3	5:00

Combate 41: Combate Lake Tahoe

August 24, 2019 - Lake Tahoe Outdoor Arena at Harvey's, Lake Tahoe, Nevada, United States

Main Event: Gustavo Lopez vs. Joey Ruquet

Fighters	Method	Round	Time
Gustavo Lopez (W) vs. Joey Ruquet	KO (Punch)	1	1:45
Bruno Cannetti (W) Andres Quintana	Decision (Unanimous)	3	5:00
Jose Luis Verdugo (W) vs. Erick Sanchez	Decision (Unanimous)	3	5:00
JJ Torres (W) vs. Cole Jordan	TKO (Punches)	1	2:33
Owen Craugh (W) vs. Aaron Armijo	TKO (Punches)	1	2:33
Lupita Godinez (W) vs. Felisha Magallan	Decision (Unanimous)	3	5:00

Combate 42: Combate Chicago

September 6, 2019 - Cicero Stadium, Cicero, Illinois, Chicago

Main Event: David Argueta vs. Ronny Mendez

Fighters	Method	Round	Time
David Argueta (W) vs. Ronny Mendez	Submission (Rear Naked Choke)	1	3:12
Georgie Medina (W) vs. Angelo Rivera Jr. (Amateur Championship Bout)	Submission (Rear Naked Choke)	5	2:12
Criszaida Adames (W) vs. Marisol Ruelas	TKO (Knees and Punches)	2	1:47
Ryan Bautista (W) vs. Ricky Maynez	Submission (Rear Naked Choke)	1	3:12

Combate 43: Combate Mexicali

September 20, 2019 - Auditorio del Estado, Mexicali, Baja California, Mexico

Main Event: Rafa Garcia vs. Erick Gonzalez

Fighters	Method	Round	Time
Rafa Garcia (W) vs. Erick Gonzalez	Decision (Unanimous)	3	5:00
Yazmin Jauregui (W) vs. Yajaira Romo	Decision (Unanimous)	3	5:00
Alberto Trujillo (W) vs. Edgar Chairez	Decision (Unanimous)	3	5:00
Eliezer Ortega (W) vs. LJ Torres	Submission (Kimura)	1	4:05
Cristian Perez (W) vs. Jair Perez	Decision (Unanimous)	3	5:00
Laura Huizar (W) vs. Karla Almaguer	TKO (Punches)	2	4:40
Gilberto Santos (W) vs. Carlos Ochoa	Submission (Armbar)	1	4:29
Gabriel Valdez (W) vs. Santiago Monreal	Decision (Unanimous)	3	5:00
Danny Silva (W) Alejandro Corrales	TKO (Punches)	3	2:08
Oscar Cota (W) vs. Cristofer Plascencia	TKO (Punches)	1	5:00

Combate 44: Combate Guadalajara

September 27, 2019 - Foro Sur, Guadalajara, Jalisco, Mexico

Main Event: Horacio Gutierrez vs. Chase Gibson

Fighters	Method	Round	Time
Horacio Gutierrez (W) vs. Chase Gibson	KO (Punch)	1	2:41
Marcelo Rojo (W) vs. Victor Madrigal	KO (Punch)	1	1:28
Silvana Gomez (W) vs. Saray Orozco	Decision (Unanimous)	3	5:00
Axel Osuna (W) vs. Heinrich Wassmer	Submission (Triangle Choke)	2	0:57
Alejandro Solorzano (W) vs. Giovanni Sarran	Decision (Unanimous)	3	5:00
Mahatma Garcia (W) vs. Luis Montelongo	Decision (Unanimous)	3	5:00
Rafael Espino (W) vs. Bryan Arreaga	Submission (Triangle Choke)	3	1:36
Adonilton Matos (W) vs. Federico Betancourt	KO (Punch)	1	1:09
Hilario Portales (W) vs. Luis Amaya Martinez	Submission (Rear Naked Choke)	1	2:43
Abigail Montes (W) vs. Claudia Zamora	Decision (Unanimous)	3	5:00

Combate 45: Combate Tucson

October 11, 2019 - Casino del Sol, Tucson, Arizona, California

Main Event: Joby Sanchez vs. Jose Alday

Fighters	Method	Round	Time
Joby Sanchez (W) vs. Jose Alday	Decision (Unanimous)	3	5:00
Anthony Birchak (W) vs. Erik Radleim	Submission (Rear Naked Choke)	1	1:40
Lucero Acosta (W) vs. Valerie Quintero	Decision (Unanimous)	3	5:00
Guillermo Torres (W) vs. Orlando Jimenez	Decision (Unanimous)	3	5:00
Jesus Rivas (W) vs. Humberto Duarte	Submission (Arm Bar)	1	0:33
Raymond Pina (W) vs. Michael Robertson	Submission (Rear Naked Choke)	3	2:46
Joao Camilo (W) vs. Jaime Alvarez	Submission (Guillotine Choke)	1	2:48
Chris Quiroz (W) vs. Gabe Brown	Decision (Split)	3	5:00
Dorian Ramos (W) vs. Anthony Elijah	TKO (Punches)	1	1:55
Erick Barreras (W) vs. Aaron Hernandez	KO (Punch)	1	2:23

Combate 46: Combate Monterrey

May 31, 2019 - Dome Care, Monterrey, Nuevo León, Mexico

Main Event: Alejandro Flores vs. Marco Elpidio

Fighters	Method	Round	Time
Alejandro Flores (W) vs. Marco Elpidio	Decision (Unanimous)	3	5:00
Ricardo Arreola (W) vs. Emmanuel Rivero	Submission (Heal Hook)	2	3:52
Criszaida Adames (W) vs. Alma Cespedes	Decision (Unanimous)	3	5:00
Ivan Perez (W) vs. Ernesto Quiroga	Submission (Rear Naked Choke)	1	1:05
Emilio Saavedra (W) vs. Mao Tena	Decision (Unanimous)	3	5:00
Ana Palacios (W) vs. Lezly Compean	Decision (Unanimous)	3	5:00
Rodrigo Garcia (W) vs. Cesar Briones	Submission (Rear Naked Choke)	1	4:18

Combate Tucson

October 11, 2019 - Casino Del Sol, Tucson, Arizona, United States

Main Event: Joby Sanchez vs. Jose Alday

Combate Monterrey

October 18, 2019 - Mexico Dome Care, Monterrey, Mexico

Main Event: Alejandro Flores vs. Marco Antonio Elpidio

Combate Día de los Muertos: Dallas

November 1, 2019 - Curtis Culwell Center, Garland, Texas, United States

Main event: Gilbert Urbina vs. Angelo Trevino

Combate San Antonio

November 8, 2019 - Freeman Coliseum, San Antonio, Texas, United States

Main Event: Nadine Mandiau vs. Melissa Cervantes

Combate Fresno

November 22, 2019 - Save Mart Center, Fresno, California, United States

Main Event: Salvador Becerra vs. Ignacio Bahamondes

Combate Americas: Tito vs. Alberto

December 7, 2019 - Payne Arena, Hidalgo, Texas, United States

Main Event: Tito Ortiz vs. Alberto El Patrón

Combate Americas: Stockton

December 13, 2019 - Stockton, California, United States

Main Event: Cameron Church vs. Alejandro Sanchez

Combate 53: Copa Combate

December 20, 2019 - Lima, Peru

Main Event: Humberto Bandenay vs. Erick Gonzalez

Combate 55: Garcia vs. Bandenay

February 21, 2020 - Auditorio del Estado, Mexicali, Baja California, Mexico

Main Event: Rafa Garcia vs. Humberto Bandenay

Combate Americas: Mexico vs. USA

February 28, 2020 - Save Mart Center, Fresno, California, United States

Main Event: Alejandro Martinez vs. Adrian Guzman

== Copa Combate ==
Copa Combate is an annual, one-night eight man tournament where the winner receives a prize of $100,000. Each fighter represents their own country, in a quest to win the "Copa." The inaugural Copa took place during the 24th anniversary of the now legendary UFC 1, which was executive produced by Ultimate Fighting Championship (UFC) co-founder and Combate Americas CEO Campbell McLaren.

Copa Combate: Cancun

In the fall of 2017, Combate Americas and Telemundo Deportes announced a partnership to produce Cope Combate, a tournament that took place on November 11, 2017, in Cancun, Mexico.

The eight bantamweight (135 pounds) fighters were separated into four brackets with the top four fighters given seeded positions based on their worldwide rankings, while the opponents were determined based on a lottery ball drawing. The tournament's semifinal stage consisted of two bouts that pit the winners of the quarterfinal stage bouts in each tournament bracket against one another. The two winners from the semifinal faced each other.

Mexican fighter Levy Saúl “El Negro” Marroquín was the winner of Copa Combate, after stepping in for Ricky Palacios after he failed to make weight.

Original Bracket

- Mikey "El Terrible" Erosa (Puerto Rico) vs. Marcelo “Pitbull" Rojo (Argentina)
- Carlos "Lobo" Rivera (Mexico) vs. Ricky "El Gallero" Palacios (USA)
- John "Sexi Mexi" Castaneda (USA) vs. Kevin "El Frío" Moreyra (Peru)
- Marc "Lufo" Gómez (Spain) vs. Andrés "Doble A" Ayala (Colombia)

Alternate Bouts

- Levy Saúl “El Negro” Marroquín (México) vs. Alejandro “The Pitbull” Abomohor (Colombia)
- Felipe Vargas (Colombia) vs. Víctor Madrigal

Ricky “El Gallero” Palacios and Andrés “Doble A Leal” Ayala were not able to make weight (the limit was 136 lbs). Therefore, Levy Saúl Marroquín took Palacios' place (now facing Rivera), while Alejandro Abomohor took Ayala's position (fighting against Gomez).

Quarter Finals

- Marcelo Rojo defeated Mike Erosa via Submission (armbar) at 2:20 of round 1
- Levy Saúl Marroquín defeated Carlos Rivera via Unanimous Decision (Score Cards: 10–9, 10–9, 10–8)
- John Castaneda defeated Kevin Moreyra via Submission (Rear-naked choke) at 4:55 of round 1.
- Marc Gomez defeated Alejandro Abomohor via Unanimous Decision (Score Cards / Tarjetas: 10–9, 10–9, 10–8)

Semi-Finals Results

- Levy Saúl Marroquín defeated Marcelo Rojo via Submission (Guillotine Choke) at 1:56 of round 3.
- John Castaneda defeated Marc Gomez via Unanimous Decision (Score Cards: 29–28, 29–28, 29–28)

Final Result

- Levy Saúl Marroquín defeated John Castaneda via Unanimous Decision (Score Cards: 30–27, 29–28, 29–28)

Copa Combate: Cancun bracket

Quarter-finals
(Puerto Rico) Mikey Erosa	1
(Argentina) Marcelo Rojo	SUB
(Mexico) Carlos Rivera	1
(Mexico) Levy Marroquín	UD
(United States) John Castaneda	SUB
(Peru) Kevin Moreyra	1
(Spain) Marc Gomez	UD
(Colombia) Alejandro Abomohor	1

Semi-finals
(Argentina) Marcelo Rojo	3
(Mexico) Levy Marroquín	SUB
(United States) John Castaneda	UD
(Spain) Marc Gomez	3

Final
(Mexico) Levy Marroquín	UD
(United States) John Castaneda	3

Copa Combate: Fresno

Original Bracket

- Andres Quintana (USA) vs. Marlon Gonzalez (Peru)
- Alejandro Flores (Mexico) vs. John Bedoya (Colombia)
- Pablo Villaseca (Chile) vs. Daniel Requeijo (Spain)
- Bruno Cannetti (Argentina) vs. Joey Ruquet (Puerto Rico)

Alternate Bouts

- Gustavo Lopez (USA) vs. Vincente Marquez (Spain)
- Pablo Sabori (Mexico) vs. Michael Irizarry (Puerto Rico)

Quarter Finals

- Andres Quintana defeated Marlon Gonzalez via Unanimous Decision (Score Cards: 10–9, 10–9, 10–9)
- Alejandro Flores defeated John Bedoya via Submission (D'arce Choke) at 3:03 of Round 1
- Pablo Villaseca defeated Daniel Requeijo vis Split Decision (Score Cards: 10–9, 10–9, 9–10)
- Bruno Cannetti defeated Joey Ruquet via Technical Knockout at 1:32 of Round 1

Semi-Finals Results

- Andres Quintana defeated Bruno Cannetti via Technical Knockout at 2:05 of Round 1
- Alejandro Flores defeated Pablo Villaseca via Unanimous Decision (Score Cards: 30–27, 30–27, 29-28 )

Final Result

- Andres Quintana defeated Alejandro Flores via Knockout at 2:49 of Round 1

Copa Combate: Fresno bracket

Quarter-finals
(United States) Andres Quintana	UD
(Peru) Marlon Gonzalez	1
(Argentina) Bruno Cannetti	SUB
(Puerto Rico) Joey Ruquet	1
(Mexico) Alejandro Flores	SUB
(Colombia) John Bedoya	1
(Chile) Pablo Villaseca	SD
(Spain) Daniel Requeijo	1

Semi-finals
(United States) Andres Quintana	TKO
(Argentina) Bruno Cannetti	1
(Mexico) Alejandro Flores	UD
(Chile) Pablo Villaseca	3

Final
(United States) Andres Quintana	KO
(Mexico) Alejandro Flores	1

== Current World champions ==
=== Men ===
Division	Champion	Since	Defenses
Lightweight	Vacant		
Featherweight	Vacant		
Bantamweight	(Mexico) David Martinez	May 29, 2021	1

=== Women ===
Division	Champion	Since	Defenses
Strawweight	Vacant		

=== World Championship history ===
==== Lightweight Championship ====
155 lbs (70 kg)

No.	Name	Event	Date	Reign	Defenses
1	(Mexico) Rafa García def. Erick Gonzalez	Combate 44; Mexicali, Mexico	September 20, 2019	267 days	1. def. Humberto Bandenay at Combate 55 on Feb 21, 2020
The title was vacated as García's contract expired and he signed with the UFC.

==== Featherweight Championship ====
145 lbs (66 kg)

No.	Name	Event	Date	Reign	Defenses
1	(Argentina) Bruno Cannetti def. Andrés Quintana	Combate 42; Lake Tahoe, Nevada, US	August 23, 2019	910 days	
The title was vacated as Cannetti's contract expired.

==== Bantamweight Championship ====
135 lbs (61 kg)

No.	Name	Event	Date	Reign	Defenses
1	(Mexico) José Alday def. Gustavo Lopez	Combate 24; Phoenix, Arizona, US	September 14, 2018	196 days	
2	(United States) Gustavo Lopez	Combate 33; Tucson, Arizona, US	March 29, 2019	289 days	1. def. Joey Ruquet at Combate 42 on Aug 23, 2019
The title was vacated as Lopez's contract expired and he signed with the UFC.
3	(Mexico) David Martínez def. Francisco Rivera Jr.	Combate Global: Bantamweight Tournament; Miami, Florida, US	May 29, 2021	1,970 days (incumbent)	1. def. Arturo Vergara at Combate Global: Martinez vs. Vergara on May 29, 2022; 2. def. Axel Osuna at Combate Global: Martinez vs. Osuna on Oct 7, 2022; 3. def. Jose Zarauz at Combate Global: Martinez vs Zarauz on May 28, 2023

==== Women's Strawweight Championship ====
115 lbs (52 kg)

No.	Name	Event	Date	Reign	Defenses
1	(Mexico) Melissa Martinez def. Desiree Yanez	Combate 51; Hidalgo, Texas, US	December 7, 2019	907 days	
The title was vacated as Martinez's contract expired and she signed with the UFC.

== See also ==
- List of current mixed martial arts champions
