= Isaac Davis =

Isaac Davis may refer to:

- Isaac Davis (soldier) (1745–1775), Revolutionary War Minuteman captain
- Isaac Davis (advisor) (1758–1810), Welsh advisor to Kamehameha I
- Isaac Davis (lawyer) (1799–1883), lawyer active in Worcester, Massachusetts
- Isaac Davis (American football) (born 1972), American football player
- Ike Davis (born 1987), American baseball first baseman
- Ike Davis (shortstop) (1895–1984), American baseball shortstop
- Isaac Mortimer Davis, the protagonist of Woody Allen's 1979 film Manhattan

== See also ==
- Isaac Davis Trail, historic trail in Massachusetts, United States
- Isaac Davis House, historic house in Massachusetts, United States
- David Isaacs (disambiguation)
