= Dominique Rodgers-Cromartie =

American football player (born 1986)

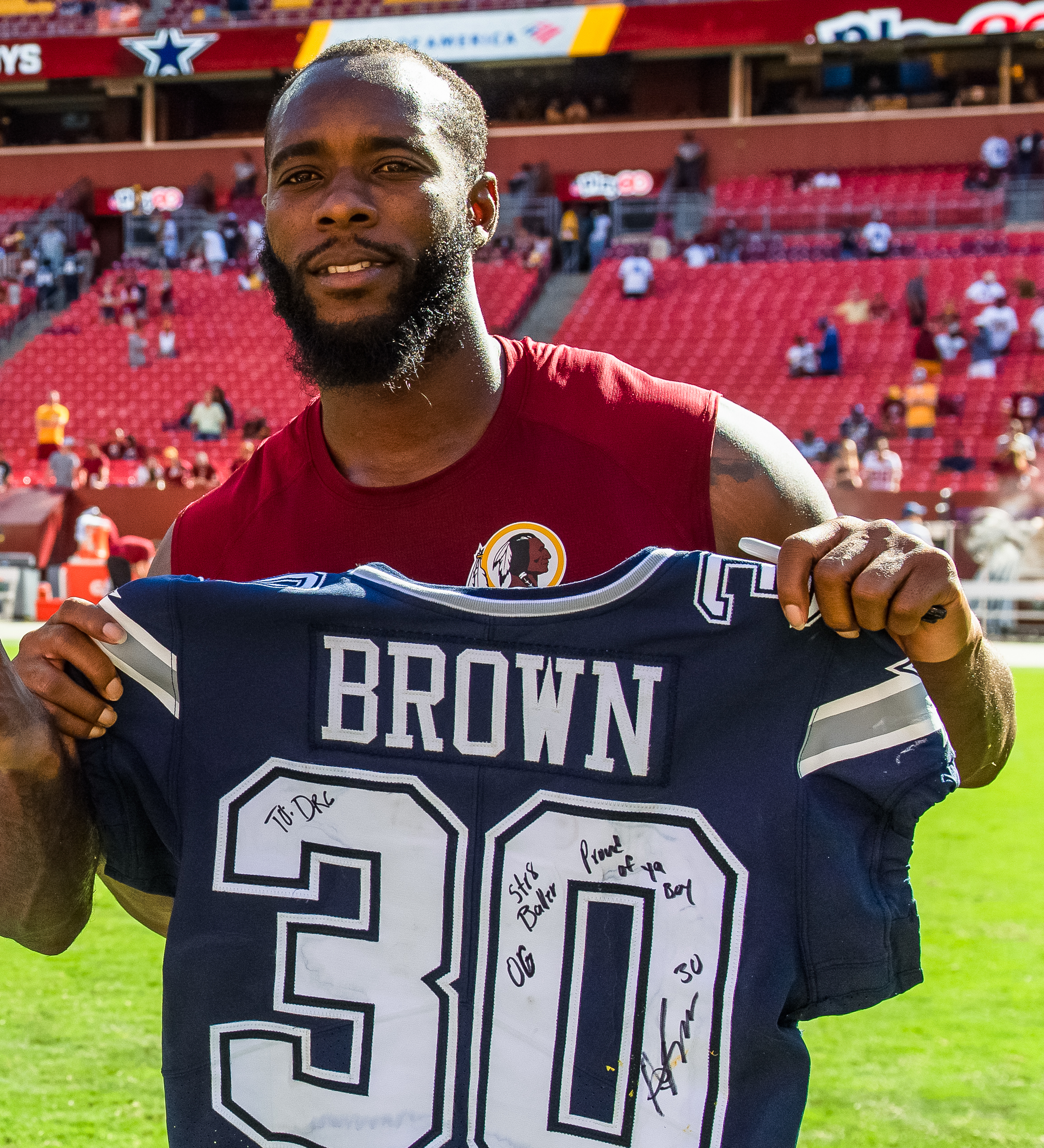
- Rodgers-Cromartie with the Redskins in 2019

No. 29, 23, 45, 21, 41
- Position: Cornerback

Personal information
- Born: April 7, 1986 (age 40); Bradenton, Florida, U.S.
- Listed height: 6 ft 2 in (1.88 m)
- Listed weight: 205 lb (93 kg)

Career information
- High school: Lakewood Ranch (Bradenton)
- College: Tennessee State (2004–2007)
- NFL draft: 2008: 1st round, 16th overall pick

Career history
- Arizona Cardinals (2008–2010); Philadelphia Eagles (2011–2012); Denver Broncos (2013); New York Giants (2014–2017); Oakland Raiders (2018); Washington Redskins (2019); Tampa Nightcrawlers (2023); Dunedin Highlanders (2024)

Awards and highlights
- Second-team All-Pro (2016); 2× Pro Bowl (2009, 2015); PFWA All-Rookie Team (2008); FCS All-American (2007); 3× First-team All-OVC (2005–2007)

Career NFL statistics
- Total tackles: 455
- Sacks: 2.5
- Forced fumbles: 7
- Fumble recoveries: 2
- Interceptions: 30
- Defensive touchdowns: 7
- Stats at Pro Football Reference

Dominique Reshard Rodgers-Cromartie (born April 7, 1986) is an American former professional football player who was a cornerback for 12 seasons in the National Football League (NFL). He played college football for the Tennessee State Tigers, and was selected by the Arizona Cardinals in the first round of the 2008 NFL draft. Rodgers-Cromartie has also played for the Philadelphia Eagles, Denver Broncos, New York Giants, Oakland Raiders, and Washington Redskins. He was selected for the Pro Bowl in 2009 and 2015. In 2023, Rodgers-Cromartie became the most notable free agent in A7FL history, joining the Tampa Nightcrawlers for their playoff run. Rodgers-Cromartie also played for the Dunedin Highlanders of the EAFL in 2024, a semi-pro football organization in Florida. Most recently, he is making his professional soccer debut in the large TST tournament (1M prize for men’s/open bracket) for a South Florida based club called Real Athletico.

== Early life ==
Rodgers-Cromartie is of Haitian descent. He was born with a non-functioning kidney that was removed when he was 8 years old. He attended three high schools, including spending his sophomore year at Lake Highland Preparatory School in Orlando, Florida, before enrolling at Lakewood Ranch High School in Bradenton, Florida, where he first received playing time; and where he was an All-Area, All-Class 5A, and All-District 11 defensive back and wide receiver. He also competed as a jumper and sprinter on the school's track team. He was named the most underrated prospect in Florida by the High School Recruiting Report.

== College career ==
While attending Tennessee State University, Rodgers-Cromartie played for the Tennessee State Tigers football team from 2004 to 2007.

In 39 starts for the Tigers, opposing quarterbacks completed just 55 of 161 passes (34.16%) thrown near Rodgers-Cromartie. He intercepted 11 of those throws, deflected 25 and held the opposition to a minuscule 3.54 yards per pass attempt, the best of any collegiate defensive back over his three seasons.

He is a member of Phi Beta Sigma fraternity.

=== Track and field ===
Rodgers-Cromartie was also a standout performer for the track team. Juggling football spring drills with the indoor and outdoor track seasons in 2007, he qualified for the NCAA Mid-East Regionals after he captured the Ohio Valley Conference long jump title, with a mark of 7.71 meters. In his second outdoor event, he was named OVC Male Athlete of the Week after finishing third at the Penn Relays with a conference-best long jump of 7.56 meters.

At the OVC Indoor Track Championships, Rodgers-Cromartie was named the top male athlete. He won the 60-meter dash with a time of 6.89 seconds, long jump with a mark of 7.71 meters and high jump with a mark of 2.07 meters and finished second in the triple jump with a mark of 14.83 meters. He performed most of the indoor season while nursing an ankle sprain. He also competed in the 100 meters, posting a career-best time of 10.75 seconds while he was at Lakewood Ranch High School.

== Professional career ==
=== Pre-draft ===
Rodgers-Cromartie drew relatively little draft interest at the start of the pre-draft process because Tennessee State played generally lackluster teams, and because of weak technique. However, he dramatically raised his profile and draft stock after impressing scouts during Senior Bowl week, performing very well during the arranged practices, and also played well in the 2008 Senior Bowl where he was named defensive MVP for the game. A 4.29 40-yard dash at the NFL Combine was among some of the fastest times in event history. He was widely regarded as the No. 2 cornerback prospect in the draft by NFL.com and ESPN analyst Mel Kiper Jr. NFL draft scouts projected him to be a first round pick and expected him to be drafted no later than the 25th overall pick.

Pre-draft measurables
Height	Weight	Arm length	Hand span	40-yard dash	10-yard split	20-yard split	20-yard shuttle	Three-cone drill	Vertical jump	Broad jump	Bench press
6 ft 1 1/2 in (1.87 m)	184 lb (83 kg)	32 3/4 in (0.83 m)	9 1/4 in (0.23 m)	4.29 s	1.49 s	2.51 s	4.14 s	6.63 s	38.5 in (0.98 m)	10 ft 11 in (3.33 m)	17 reps
All values from NFL Combine/Pro Day

=== Arizona Cardinals ===
==== 2008 ====
The Arizona Cardinals selected Rodgers-Cromartie in the first round (16th overall) of the 2008 NFL draft. He was the second cornerback selected after (11th overall) Leodis McKelvin. He became the first player from 1-AA to be selected in the first round of the NFL Draft in eight years with the last instance being cornerback 2000 first-round pick (23rd overall) Rashard Anderson of Jackson State.

On July 25, 2008, the Cardinals signed Rodgers-Cromartie to a five–year, $12.52 million rookie contract that includes $8.98 million guaranteed and has a maximum value of $15.10 million.

Throughout training camp, he competed to be a starting cornerback against Roderick Hood and Eric Green. Head coach Ken Whisenhunt named him a backup and listed him as the third cornerback on the depth chart to begin the season, behind starters Eric Green and Roderick Hood.

On September 7, 2008, Rodgers-Cromartie made his professional regular season debut in the Arizona Cardinals' season-opener at the San Francisco 49ers and had one solo tackle as they won 23–13. In Week 3, Rodgers-Cromartie earned his first career start as a nickelback and recorded two combined tackles (one solo) during a 35–56 loss at the New York Jets. On November 16, 2008, Rodgers-Cromartie made four combined tackles (two solo), two pass deflections, and set a season-high with two interceptions during a 26–20 victory at the Seattle Seahawks. He had his first career interception on a pass attempt thrown by Matt Hasselbeck to wide receiver Koren Robinson in the second quarter. His second interception of the game sealed the Cardinals' victory after he picked off another pass by Hasselbeck to wide receiver Deion Branch with only 2:05 remaining. The following week, he had three solo tackles and set a new season-high with four pass deflections as the Cardinals defeated the San Francisco 49ers 29–24 in Week 10. He supplanted Eric Green as the No. 2 starting cornerback and remained the starter for the remainder of the season. In Week 14, Rodgers-Cromartie set a season-high with five solo tackles, made two pass deflection, and returned an interception for his first career touchdown during a 34–10 victory against the St. Louis Rams. His first career pick-six was during the fourth quarter after he picked off a pass in the endzone thrown by Marc Bulger to wide receiver Torry Holt and returned it 99–yards for his first touchdown in his career. He finished his rookie season with 43 combined tackles (39 solo), 19 pass deflections, four interceptions, and one touchdown, while appearing in all 16 games with 11 starts.

The Arizona Cardinals finished the 2008 NFL season first in the NFC West with a 9–7 record to clinch a playoff berth. On January 3, 2009, Rodgers-Cromartie started in his first career playoff game and led the Cardinals with ten combined tackles (nine solo), made two pass deflections, and intercepted a pass by Matt Ryan to wide receiver Roddy White during a 30–24 victory against the Atlanta Falcons in the Wild Card Round. On January 10, 2009, he started in the Divisional Round at the Carolina Panthers and had one solo tackle, led the team with four pass deflections, and intercepted a pass by Jake Delhomme in the red zone to wide receiver Steve Smith Sr. during a 33–13 victory. The following game, he had four solo tackles and a pass deflection in the NFC Championship as the Cardinals defeated the Philadelphia Eagles 32–25 to advance to their first Super Bowl appearance in franchise history. On February 1, 2009, Rodgers-Cromartie started in Super Bowl XLIII and made four solo tackles and two pass deflections as the Cardinals lost 27–23 to the Pittsburgh Steelers, who his head coach Ken Whisenhunt had coached as the offensive coordinator in 2006. The Super Bowl matchup against the Steelers is widely regarded as one of the best Super Bowl games in history. On February 6, 2009, one week after Super Bowl XLIII, the Arizona Cardinals fired defensive coordinator Clancy Pendergast.

==== 2009 ====
The Cardinals promoted linebackers coach Billy Davis to defensive coordinator, Rodgers-Cromartie entered training camp slated as the de facto No. 1 starting cornerback following the departures of Roderick Hood and Eric Green. Head coach Ken Whisenhunt named him a starting cornerback to begin the season and paired him with Bryant McFadden.

In Week 5, Rodgers-Cromartie made three solo tackles, a pass deflection, and returned an interception thrown by Matt Schaub to wide receiver Kevin Walter for a 49–yard touchdown with 2:20 left in the fourth quarter to lead the Cardinals to a 28–21 victory against the Houston Texans. In Week 13, he set a season-high with six solo tackles and recorded two pass deflections as the Cardinals defeated the Minnesota Vikings 30–17. On December 20, 2009, Rodgers-Cromartie made three solo tackles, set a season-high with four pass deflections, and set another season-high with two interceptions off passes thrown by Drew Stanton during a 31–24 victory at the Detroit Lions. The following week, he had three solo tackles, two pass deflections, and set a career-high with his sixth interception of the season on a pass by Keith Null to wide receiver Donnie Avery during a 31–10 win against the St. Louis Rams in Week 16. He started all 16 games for the first time in his career and finished with a total of 50 combined tackles (48 solo), set a career-high with 25 passes defended, made six interceptions, and one touchdown. He earned the first Pro Bowl selection of his career as a reserve.

The Arizona Cardinals finished the 2009 NFL season with a 10–6 record. On January 10, 2010, Rodgers-Cromartie started in the Wild Card Round and made three solo tackles, one pass deflection, and intercepted a pass by Aaron Rodgers to tight end Donald Lee on the first offensive snap of the game as the Cardinals defeated the Green Bay in overtime 51–45. The following week, he had three solo tackles as the Cardinals were routed 14–45 at the New Orleans Saints in the Divisional Round and also sustained an injury that rendered him unable to participate in the 2010 Pro Bowl.

==== 2010 ====
He returned as the No. 1 starting cornerback and was paired with Greg Toler. On October 10, 2010, Rodgers-Cromartie had four solo tackles, two pass deflections, and returned an interception thrown by Drew Brees to wide receiver Lance Moore for a 28–yard touchdown during a 30–20 victory against the New Orleans Saints. In Week 10, he tied his season-high of five combined tackles (four solo), made one pass deflection, and intercepted a pass by Charlie Whitehurst to wide receiver Ben Obomanu during an 18–36 loss against the Seattle Seahawks. On December 25, 2010, Rodgers-Cromartie made three combined tackles (two solo), set a season-high with three pass deflections, and returned an interception thrown by Jon Kitna to wide receiver Miles Austin for a 33–yard touchdown as the Cardinals defeated the Dallas Cowboys 30–20. He started in all 16 games in 2010 and had a total of 44 combined tackles (42 solo), 16 pass deflections, three interceptions, and two touchdowns.

As of 2018, his three postseason interceptions remained a Cardinals franchise record shared with Aeneas Williams.

=== Philadelphia Eagles ===
==== 2011 ====
On July 28, 2011, the Philadelphia Eagles traded quarterback Kevin Kolb to the Arizona Cardinals in return for Rodgers-Cromartie and a 2012 second-round pick (51st overall). The following day, the Eagles signed top free agent cornerback Nnamdi Asomugha. Upon his arrival, Rodgers-Cromartie was assigned No. 23 as No. 24 was unavailable after the acquisition of Nnamdi Asomugha.

He entered training camp as a possible candidate to become the No. 2 starting cornerback, competing for it against Asante Samuel under defensive coordinator Juan Castillo. Head coach Andy Reid named Rodgers-Cromartie a backup and listed him as the third cornerback on the depth chart to begin the season, behind starting tandem Nnamdi Asomugha and Asante Samuel.

On November 13, 2011, Rodgers-Cromartie set a season-high with three solo tackles, made one pass deflection, and had his first career sack on John Skelton for a seven–yards during a 17–21 loss against his former team, the Arizona Cardinals. He was inactive for three games (Weeks 11–13) due to an ankle injury. He started the last two games of the season (Weeks 16–17) after Asante Samuel suffered a hamstring injury. He finished the season with 28 combined tackles (26 solo), six pass deflections, and one sack in 13 games and three starts. He registered zero interceptions in his first season with the Eagles, while playing mostly the nickel.

==== 2012 ====
Throughout training camp, he competed to be the No. 2 starting cornerback against Curtis Marsh Jr. and rookie Brandon Boykin following the departure of Asante Samuel. On August 17, 2012, Rodgers-Cromartie was fined $21,000 for hitting Pittsburgh Steelers quarterback Byron Leftwich in the head and neck during the preseason. He was named a starting cornerback to begin the season, alongside Nnamdi Asomugha.

On September 9, 2012, Rodgers-Cromartie started in the Philadelphia Eagles' season-opener at the Cleveland Browns and made one solo tackle, set a season-high with four pass deflections, and set a season-high with two interceptions on pass attempts thrown by Brandon Weeden during a 17–16 victory. In Week 4, he made five combined tackles (four solo), one pass deflection, and helped secure a 19–17 victory against the New York Giants with a fourth quarter interception on a pass by Eli Manning to tight end Martellus Bennett. In Week 12, Rodgers-Cromartie set a season-high with nine combined tackles (eight solo) and made two pass deflections during a 22–30 loss to the Carolina Panthers. He started in all 16 games and had 51 combined tackles (43 solo), 16 pass deflections, and three interceptions.

=== Denver Broncos ===
On March 13, 2013, the Denver Broncos signed Rodgers-Cromartie to a two–year, $10.00 million contract that included $5.00 million guaranteed and an initial signing bonus of $4.20 million. He chose to wear No. 45 which he wore during college at Tennessee State as No. 24 and No. 26 were unavailable.

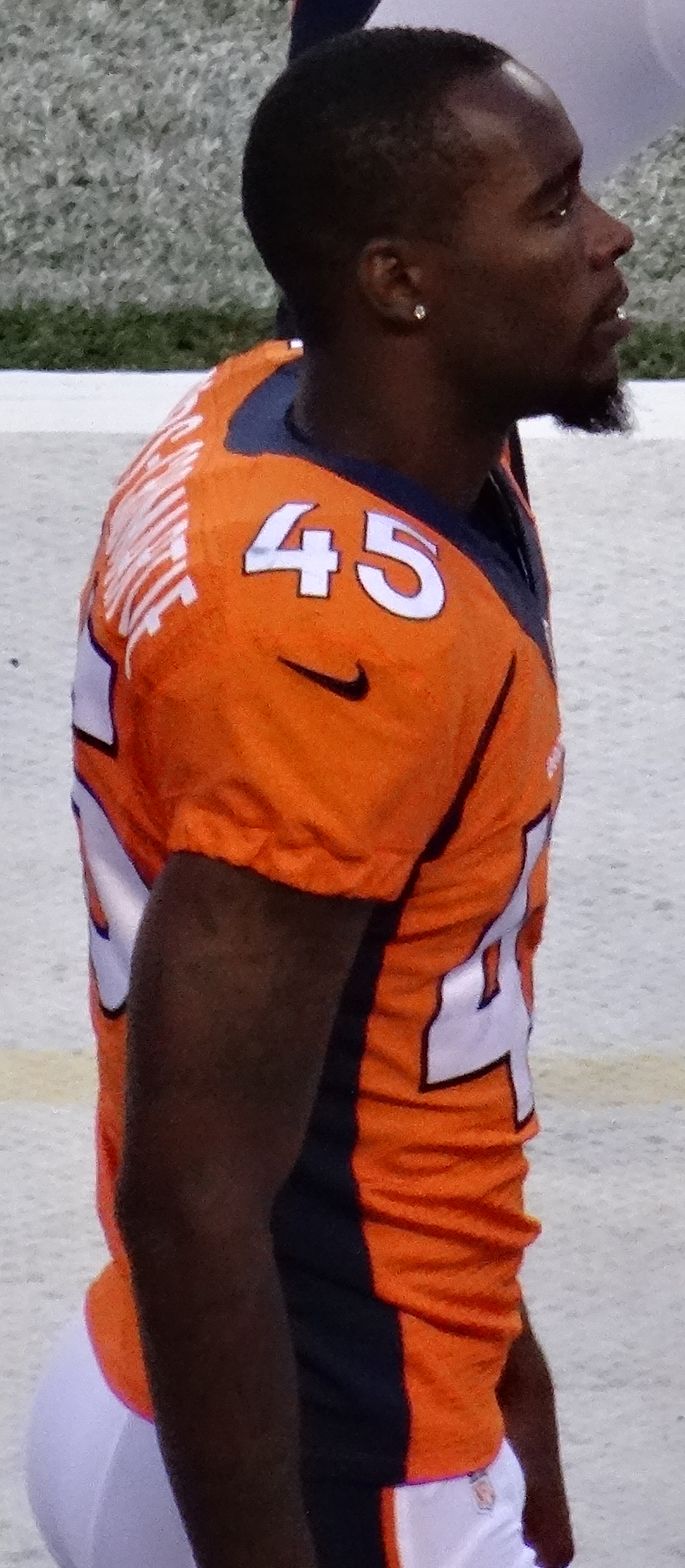
Rodgers-Cromartie with the Denver Broncos in 2013.

Throughout training camp, he competed against Chris Harris Jr. to be the No. 2 starting cornerback under defensive coordinator Jack Del Rio in order to replace Tracy Porter. Head coach John Fox named him a starting cornerback to begin the season and paired him with Chris Harris Jr. after No. 1 starting cornerback Champ Bailey suffered a foot injury and missed the beginning of the season. In Week 2, Rodgers-Cromartie made five combined tackles (three solo), two pass deflections, and intercepted a pass by Eli Manning to wide receiver Hakeem Nicks in the closing seconds of the first half, in a 41–23 victory at the New York Giants in the Manning Bowl. On October 27, 2013, Rodgers-Cromartie recorded five combined tackles (four solo), set a season-high with three pass deflections, and had a pick-six after intercepting a pass by Kirk Cousins to wide receiver Pierre Garçon and returned it back 75–yards for a touchdown in a 45–21 win against the Washington Redskins. In Week 12, he had one pass deflection before sitting out the second half of a 31–34 overtime loss at the New England Patriots after injuring his shoulder fielding a Hail Mary pass by Tom Brady. He remained inactive the following week as the Broncos won 35–28 at the Kansas City Chiefs in Week 13. He finished the season with 31 combined tackles (25 solo), 14 pass deflections, three interceptions, and one touchdown in 15 games and 14 starts.

The Denver Broncos finished the 2013 NFL season first in their division, the AFC West, with a 13–3 record and earned a first-round bye. On January 12, 2014, Rodgers-Cromartie made four solo tackles and led his team with three pass deflections as the Broncos won 24–17 at the San Diego Chargers in the AFC Divisional Round. The following game, he had three solo tackles and one pass deflection during a 26–16 victory against the New England Patriots in the AFC Championship Game to advance to the Super Bowl. On February 3, 2014, Rodgers-Cromartie started in Super Bowl XLVIII, but was limited to one solo tackle as the Broncos lost 43–8 to the Seattle Seahawks.

=== New York Giants ===
==== 2014 ====
On March 17, 2014, the New York Giants signed Rodgers-Cromartie to a five–year, $35.00 million contract that included $13.98 million guaranteed, $11.98 million guaranteed upon signing, and an initial signing bonus of $10.00 million. He entered training camp slated as a starting cornerback following the departure of Corey Webster. Head coach Tom Coughlin named him the No. 1 starting cornerback to begin the season and paired him with Prince Amukamara.

In Week 2, he set a season-high with five solo tackles and two pass deflections during a 14–25 loss against the Arizona Cardinals. On September 21, 2014, Rodgers-Cromartie recorded three solo tackles, tied his season-high with two pass deflections, and intercepted a pass by Ryan Fitzpatrick to wide receiver DeAndre Hopkins as the Giants defeated the Houston Texans 30–17. On December 7, 2014, Rodgers-Cromartie recorded one pass deflection and had an interception on a pass by Zach Mettenberger to tight end Delanie Walker as the Giants routed the Tennessee Titans 36–7. He finished the season with a total of 38 combined tackles (36 solo), 12 pass deflections, and two interceptions in 16 games and 15 starts.

==== 2015 ====
On June 9, 2015, Rodgers-Cromartie elected to switch his jersey number from No. 21 to No. 41 in order to accommodate rookie Landon Collins. This was his fifth time changing his number in his career. He entered training camp slated as the de facto No. 1 starting cornerback under new defensive coordinator Steve Spagnuolo after the Giants fired defensive coordinator Perry Fewell. Head coach Tom Coughlin retained Rodgers-Cromartie and Prince Amukamara as the starting cornerbacks to begin the season.

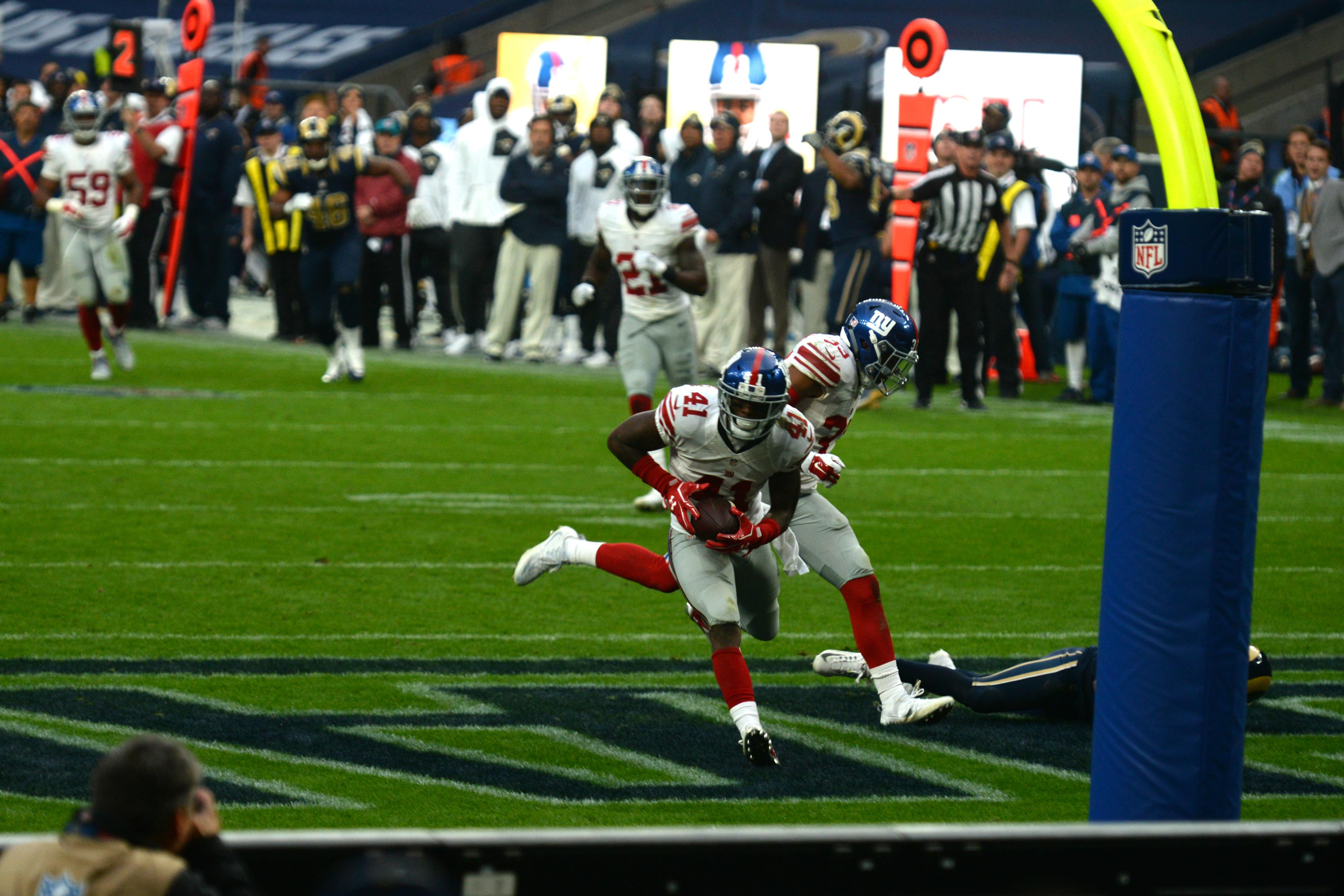
Rodgers-Cromartie intercepts a pass against the Los Angeles Rams in London in 2016.

On September 13, 2015, Rodgers-Cromartie started in the New York Giants' season-opener at the Dallas Cowboys and made six solo tackles, one pass deflection, and returned a fumble recovery that Trumaine McBride caused tackling wide receiver Cole Beasley for a 57–yard touchdown during a 26–27 loss. In Week 2, Rodgers-Cromartie recorded two solo tackles before exiting during the second quarter of a 20–24 loss against the Atlanta Falcons to be evaluated for a possible concussion after hitting his head while tackling running back Tevin Coleman. He subsequently remained inactive for the Giants' 30–21 win against the Washington Redskins in Week 3 after being diagnosed with a concussion. In Week 7, Rodgers-Cromartie recorded two solo tackles, two pass deflections, set a season-high with two interceptions, and returned one for a touchdown during a 27–20 victory against the Dallas Cowboys. In the beginning of the third quarter, Rodgers-Cromartie picked off a pass by Matt Cassel to wide receiver Terrance Williams and returned it 58–yards for a touchdown. The following game, he recorded six solo tackles, made two pass deflections, and intercepted a pass by Drew Brees to wide receiver Brandin Cooks as the Giants lost 49–52 at the New Orleans Saints in Week 8. In Week 10, he set a season-high with seven solo tackles as the Giants lost 26–27 at the New England Patriots. He finished with a career-high 58 combined tackles (52 solo), 13 pass deflections, three interceptions, and two forced fumbles. On January 26, 2016, he was named to his second Pro Bowl, replacing the New England Patriots' Malcolm Butler.

==== 2016 ====
On January 4, 2016, the New York Giants announced the retirement of head coach Tom Coughlin and promoted offensive coordinator Ben McAdoo to head coach. McAdoo retained Steve Spagnuolo as the defensive coordinator. Throughout training camp, Rodgers-Cromartie competed to be the No. 2 starting cornerback against 2016 first-round pick Eli Apple.

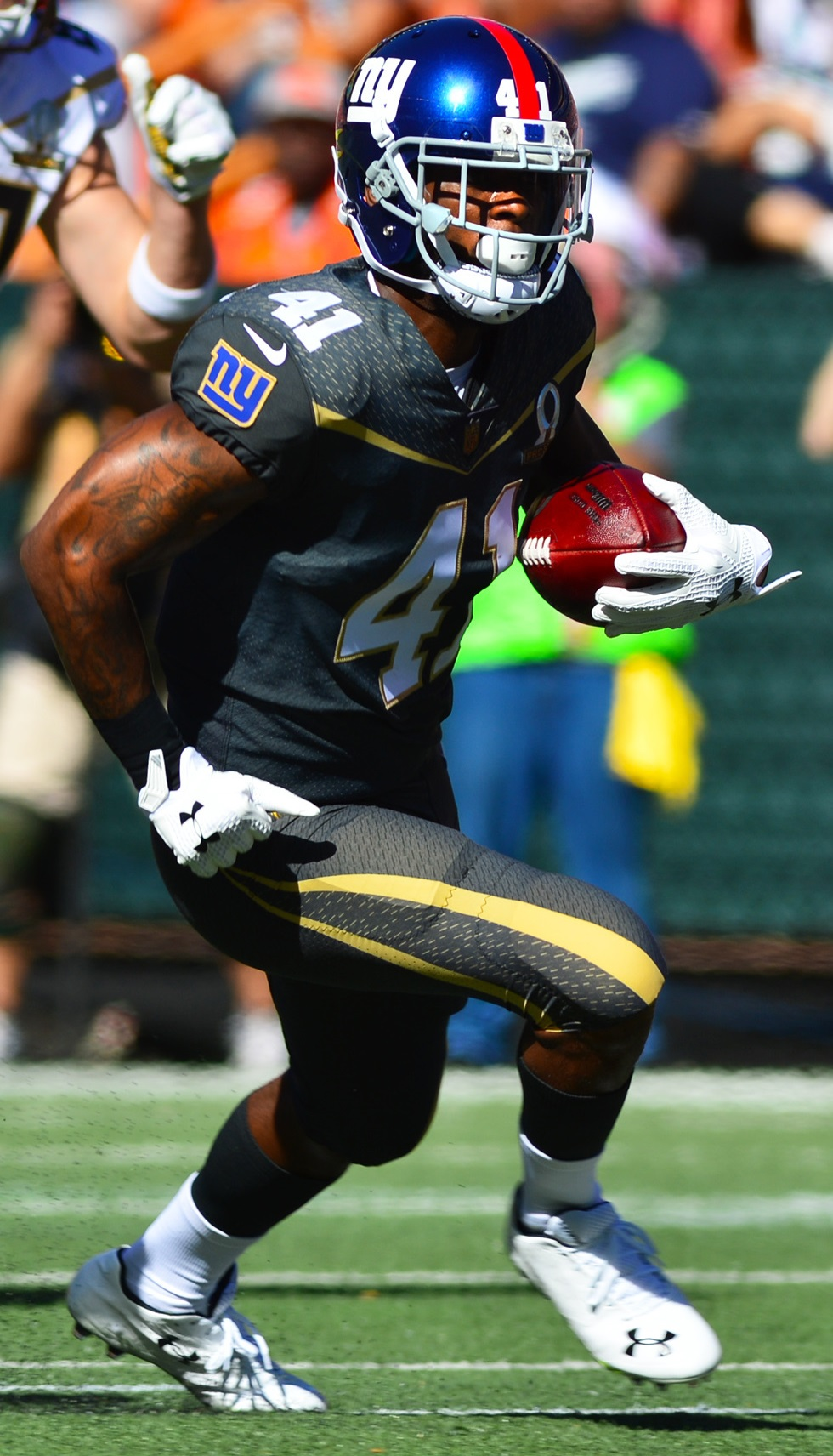
Rodgers-Cromartie at the 2016 Pro Bowl

On September 25, 2016, Rodgers-Cromartie recorded two solo tackles and made one pass deflection before exiting in the second quarter of the Giants' 29–27 loss against the Washington Redskins after injuring his groin. Due to his groin injury, he was subsequently inactive for the Giants' 10–24 loss at the Minnesota Vikings in Week 4. On October 23, 2016, Rodgers-Cromartie recorded four solo tackles, made three pass deflections, and set a season-high with two interceptions at the Los Angeles Rams during a 17–10 victory. His second interception of the game was with 4:10 remaining in the fourth quarter as he picked off a pass by Case Keenum to wide receiver Tavon Austin in the endzone. Entering Week 10, defensive coordinator Steve Spagnuolo elected to demote Rodgers-Cromartie to being the third cornerback on the depth chart and named rookie Eli Apple the starter alongside Janoris Jenkins in his place. He was tasked with covering the slot as the nickelback. On December 18, 2016, Rodgers-Cromartie set a season-high with seven combined tackles (five solo), made three pass deflections, and sealed the Giants' 17–6 victory against the Detroit Lions after picking off a pass thrown by Matthew Stafford to wide receiver Anquan Boldin with only 2:09 remaining. The following week, he had two solo tackles, made two pass deflections, and intercepted a pass attempt by Carson Wentz to wide receiver Bryce Treggs during a 19–24 loss at the Philadelphia Eagles in Week 16. On January 1, 2017, Rodgers-Cromartie made three combined tackles (one solo), two pass deflections, one sack, and tied his career-high of six interceptions in a season after picking off two passes thrown by Kirk Cousins during a 19–10 victory at the Washington Redskins. He finished the 2016 NFL season with 49 combined tackles (41 solo), 21 passes defended, a career-high six interceptions, one sack, and one forced fumble in 15 games and nine starts.

==== 2017 ====
Throughout training camp, he competed against Eli Apple to be the No. 2 starting cornerback. Head coach Ben McAdoo named him a backup as the third cornerback on the depth chart to begin the season, behind starters Janoris Jenkins and Eli Apple.

On September 18, 2017, Rodgers-Cromartie set a season-high with 11 combined tackles (eight solo) during a 10–24 loss against the Detroit Lions. On October 11, 2017, the Giants temporarily suspended Rodgers-Cromartie after he had an unexcused leave from the team's facility. The suspension was triggered when Rodgers-Cromartie and head coach Ben McAdoo had an argument about Rodgers-Cromartie being pulled from the previous game in Week 5. Later on, it was revealed that Rodgers-Cromartie had only left the facility after McAdoo told him that he was suspended. On October 12, 2017, the Giants officially announced that Rodgers-Cromartie would be suspended indefinitely. On October 17, 2017, he was reinstated from his suspension. He finished the 2017 NFL season with a total of 48 combined tackles (31 solo) and one pass defended in 15 games and five starts.

On January 22, 2018, the New York Giants hired Pat Shurmur as their head coach to replace Ben McAdoo after he was fired following a 3–13 record. During the 2018 offseason, the Giants announced their intentions to move Rodgers-Cromartie to safety. On March 11, 2018, the New York Giants officially released Rodgers-Cromartie, saving them $6.5 million in cap space.

=== Oakland Raiders ===
On August 23, 2018, the Oakland Raiders signed Rodgers-Cromartie to a one–year, $1.01 million contract. He competed to be a starting cornerback against Leon Hall, Rashaan Melvin, and Gareon Conley following the departures of Sean Smith and T. J. Carrie. Head coach Jon Gruden named him a backup and listed him as the fourth cornerback on the depth chart to begin the season, behind Rashaan Melvin, Gareon Conley, and Leon Hall.

On October 14, 2018, Rodgers-Cromartie earned his first start of the season and recorded two solo tackles during a 3–27 loss against the Seattle Seahawks. On October 30, 2018, Rodgers-Cromartie unexpectedly announced his retirement. He was limited to eight solo tackles and two pass deflections in seven games and one start.

=== Washington Redskins ===
On March 16, 2019, the Washington Redskins signed Rodgers-Cromartie, who came out of retirement, to a one–year, $1.07 million contract. Throughout training camp, he competed to be a starting cornerback against Josh Norman and Quinton Dunbar. Head coach Jay Gruden named him a backup as the fourth cornerback on the depth chart to begin the season, behind Josh Norman, Quinton Dunbar, and Fabian Moreau.

On September 15, 2019, Rodgers-Cromartie started in place of Quinton Dunbar who was inactive due to an ankle injury and made four combined tackles (two solo) during their 21–31 loss against the Dallas Cowboys. He injured his ankle during the game and was seen limping, but he chose to finish the game as the Redskins were already lacking cornerbacks. On September 18, 2019, the Washington Redskins officially placed him on injured reserve due to a torn ligament in his ankle.

=== A7FL ===
After spending four years away from professional football, Rodgers-Cromartie signed with the Tampa Nightcrawlers of the A7FL in 2023 to play with them for their playoff run. Rodgers-Cromartie became the first major former NFL starter to sign with the league. In his first game with the A7FL, Rodgers-Cromartie contributed 4 tackles in an 84–6 win over the O-Town Orange, leading the Nightcrawlers to the Florida division title.

== NFL career statistics ==
Legend
**Bold**	Career high

Year	Team	Games		Tackles				Fumbles			Interceptions					
Year	Team	GP	GS	Cmb	Solo	Ast	Sck	FF	FR	Yds	Int	Yds	Avg	Lng	TD	PD
2008	ARI	16	11	42	38	4	0.0	0	**1**	0	4	**157**	**39.2**	**99**	1	19
2009	ARI	16	16	50	48	2	0.0	**3**	0	0	**6**	77	12.8	49	1	**25**
2010	ARI	16	16	44	42	2	0.0	0	0	0	3	86	28.7	32	**2**	17
2011	PHI	13	3	28	26	2	**1.0**	0	0	0	0	0	0.0	0	0	6
2012	PHI	16	16	51	43	8	0.0	0	0	0	3	14	4.7	14	0	17
2013	DEN	15	13	31	25	6	0.0	0	0	0	3	75	25.0	75	1	14
2014	NYG	16	15	38	36	2	0.0	0	0	0	2	26	13.0	16	0	12
2015	NYG	15	15	**58**	**52**	6	0.0	2	**1**	**57**	3	72	24.0	58	1	13
2016	NYG	15	9	49	41	8	**1.0**	1	0	0	**6**	28	4.7	28	0	21
2017	NYG	15	5	48	31	**17**	0.5	0	0	0	0	0	0.0	0	0	1
2018	OAK	7	1	8	8	0	0.0	1	0	0	0	0	0.0	0	0	2
2019	WAS	2	1	7	5	2	0.0	0	0	0	0	0	0.0	0	0	0
Career		162	121	454	395	59	2.5	7	2	57	30	535	16.9	99	6	147

== Personal life ==
He is the cousin of cornerbacks Antonio Cromartie, Marcus Cromartie, and Minnesota Vikings cornerback Isaiah Rodgers. His father Stanley was also a former assistant coach for the Bethune–Cookman Wildcats men's basketball team.
