= Iron Ring (TV series) =

American reality television series

- Created by: Reginald Hudlin, Warrington Hudlin, Campbell McLaren, David Isaacs
- Country of origin: United States
- No. of episodes: 14

Production
- Running time: 30 minutes
- Production companies: Zilo Live, Inc.

Original release
- Network: BET
- Release: March 18, 2008 – 2008

Iron Ring is an American reality television series and mixed martial arts (MMA) competition that aired on BET.

== Format ==
On this show, professional MMA fighters that have yet to make a big name for themselves were selected onto teams representing five different weight classes (Heavyweight, Middleweight, and Lightweight [which the show contested at 170lbs rather than 155lbs]).

Each team had a celebrity owner and MMA coach who evaluated the try outs and selected contestants. Team owners included boxing champ Floyd Mayweather and Rick Ross managing the Money Mayweather Boys; hip-hop artist Ludacris with Team Luda; Nelly representing Team Nelly; T.I. leading Team Grand Hustle; Juelz Santana and Jim Jones heading Dipset; and Lil Jon with the Head Busters. Featured MMA coaches included Shonie Carter and Charles Bennett.

The respective teams then fought over the course of several weeks, building towards a finale that took place in New Orleans in February 2008.

== Winner ==
The winners of each weight class included:

- Heavyweight: Abongo Humphrey
- Middleweight: Jamie Yager
- Lightweight (170lbs): Josh Gaskins

The ultimate team winner was Team Nelly.
