= Campbell McLaren =

American media executive

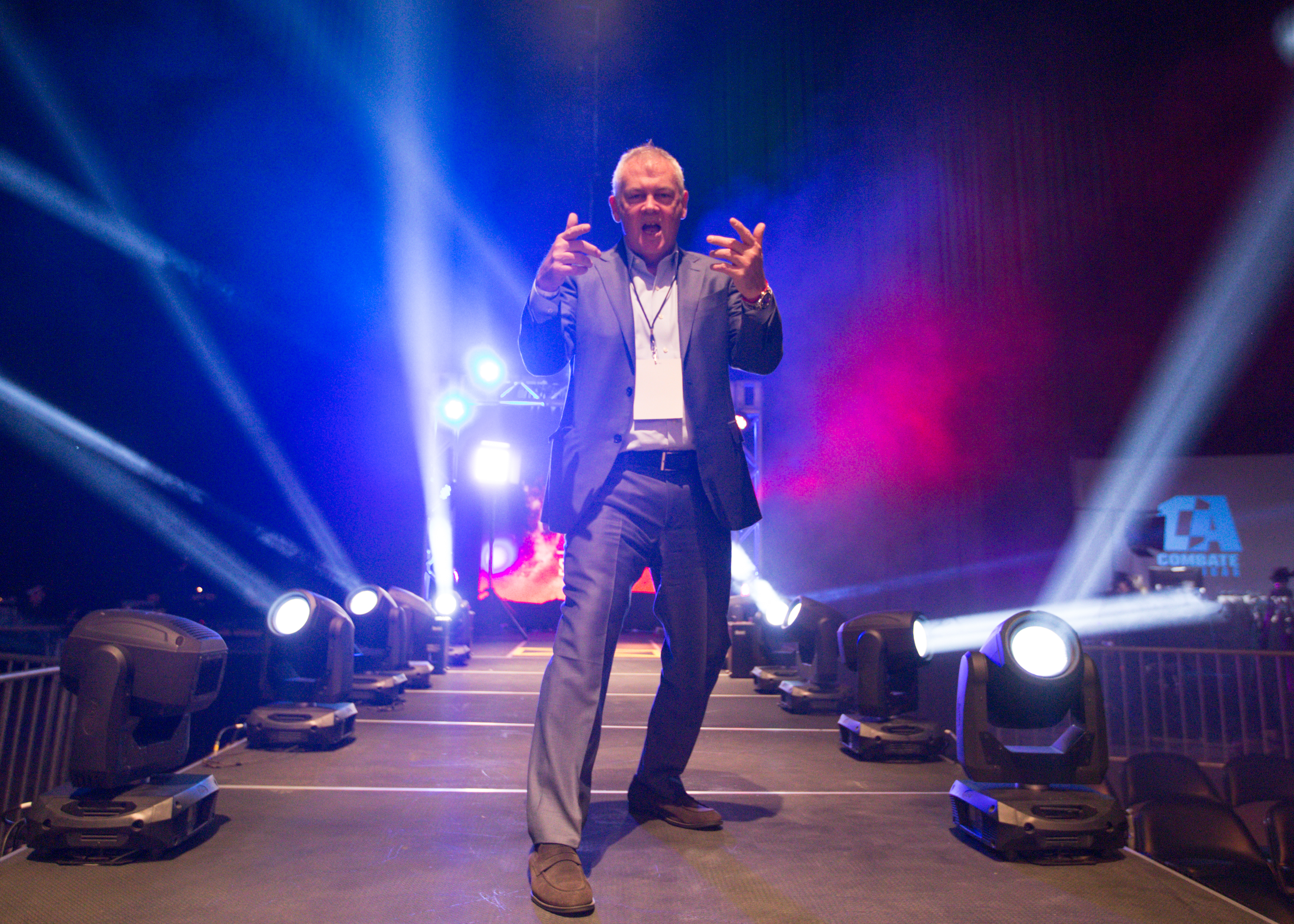
- Born: June 18, 1956 (age 70); Scotland
- Occupation: CEO
- Known for: Creation of UFC and Combate Americas

Campbell McLaren (born June 18, 1956) is a Scottish–American entrepreneur and media executive. He is the co-creator of the UFC. ESPN said he is the 10th most influential person in UFC history and that "his influence on the promotion cannot be overstated." McLaren was responsible for marketing the first UFC shows and subsequently became responsible for the entire operation.

== Early life ==
McLaren was born in Scotland and emigrated to the United States when he was six years old. His father was a former RAF Flight Officer and hospital executive and his mother was a Presbyterian Church administrator.

== Education ==
McLaren went to primary school in Cowie, Scotland, elementary school and middle school in Philadelphia, Pennsylvania, and high school in Indianapolis, Indiana.

He received an AB from the University of California, Berkeley. He also studied video production at MIT, with documentarian Richard Leacock.

== Professional life and creation of the UFC ==
McLaren began his career in New York at Caroline's Comedy Club (now Caroline's on Broadway) as talent director. He began producing TV shows for cable, network, and pay-per-view in 1989, winning awards including the Cable Ace and the Imagen Award.

In 1993, McLaren was the head of programming for SEG, BMG's pay-per-view television company. He received a call from Art Davie representing Rorion Gracie and his “War of the Worlds,” a martial arts tournament idea. McLaren envisioned a reality version of the hit video game Mortal Kombat, and immediately put the concept into development. The result was the Ultimate Fighting Championship (UFC), which premiered on pay per view November 12, 1993.

McLaren developed the controversial marketing slogan "There Are No Rules". This along with his notorious interview in the The New York Times, "Death is Cheap: Maybe It's Just 14.95," launched the franchise and delivered a high pay-per-view buyrate. Public interest and the popularity of the UFC increased leading to its appearance on Friends (The One with the Ultimate Fighting Champion), the cover of Mad Magazine (which featured McLaren as the promoter "Marky D Sodd"), and in the Denzel Washington film, Virtuosity.

McLaren chose Joe Rogan to do post fight interviews on UFC 12. According to Rogan, "My manager was friends with Campbell McLaren. And Campbell McLaren is amazing. He's a great guy and he's been on the podcast. And Campbell, had he had an opening and he said we need someone to do the post-fight interviews."

In 2000, McLaren and David Isaacs, with whom he worked on the early UFCs, founded the VC backed College TV Network, Zilo, which was an early version of a user-generated content programming network. Zilo launched Collegehumor.com with the TV series Sex Violence Collegehumor.com.

Campbell McLaren also launched the Iron Ring, an MMA competition reality series, with Floyd Mayweather, Ludacris, Nelly, and T.I.

== Combate Global ==
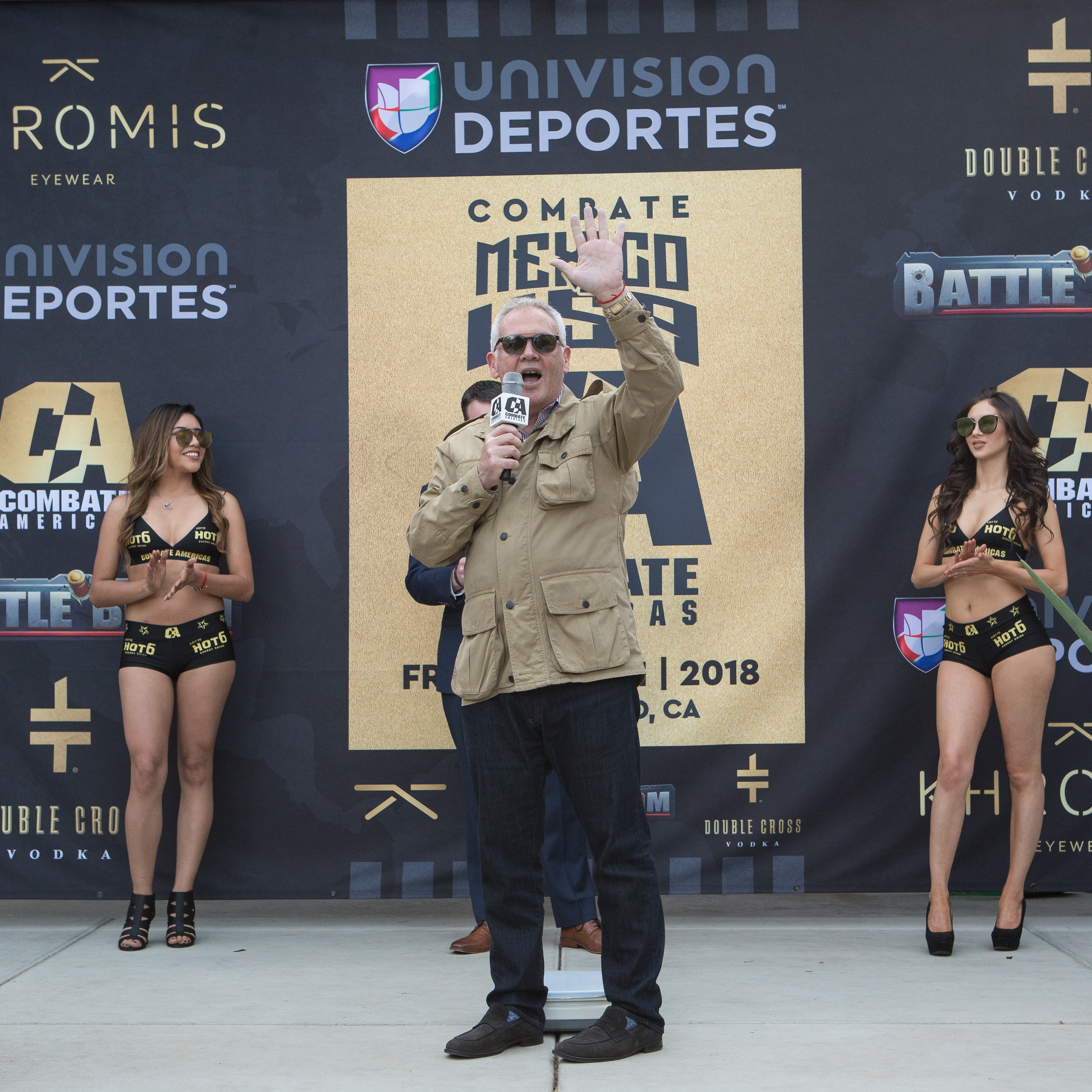
Campbell McLaren at a Weigh-in

Campbell McLaren is currently CEO of Combate Global, the first Hispanic MMA sports and media franchise.

Campbell McLaren created Combate Global in 2011. Beginning as a reality show on Mun2, Combate Global fights air in the United States, Brazil and Spanish-speak countries.

“I saw that there was a huge group of sports fans that didn't have anything to root for. Combate fit perfectly into the demographics of the US/Hispanic World," McLaren said of creating a Hispanic franchise.

Focusing on country against country rivalries, Combate Global brings the excitement of Soccer to MMA. McLaren created COPA COMBATE, an eight-man tournament, pitting country against country. It aired on the 24th anniversary of UFC 1.

"Combate is MMA with a Spanish flavor ... we've always said we’re presenting a thoroughly authentic Hispanic product, and we stuck to that," said McLaren.

Combate Global has grown rapidly, both on Television and streaming live on social media. Their second annual Copa Combate had better ratings than Bellator (the second event to do so). The inaugural event of 2019 outperformed their competitors, on Paramount, ESPN 2 and TNT as well as Telemundo Boxing, getting 610,000 viewers on Univision and UDN, despite its midnight ET timeslot. The event in Hidalgo, Texas on June 26, was the highest rated MMA event of the night and beat both the UFC and Bellator.

== Filmography ==
Year	Film	Credit
1988	The Jelly Donut Saga (short)	Producer
1989	Trick or Geek	Producer
1989	Party of Two	Producer
1990	Teacher Teacher	Producer
1990	Nothing Upstairs	Executive Producer
1990	Eppy's Emporium	Producer
1992	Free to Laugh: A Comedy and Music Special for Amnesty International	Producer
1993	Andrew Dice Clay: No Apologies	Producer
1993	UFC 1: The Beginning	Executive Producer
1993	Iron Maiden: Raising Hell	Executive Producer
1994	UFC 2: No Way Out	Executive Producer
1994	UFC 3: The American Dream	Executive Producer
1994	UFC 4: Revenge of the Warriors	Executive Producer
1995	UFC 5:The Return of the Beast	Executive Producer
1995	UFC 6: Clash of the Titans	Executive Producer
1995	UFC: Ultimate Ultimate 1995	Executive Producer
1996	UFC 9: Motor City Madness	Executive Producer
1996	UFC 10: The Tournament	Executive Producer
1996	UFC 11: The Proving Ground	Executive Producer
1999	Paul McCartney & Friends Live: PETA's Millennium Concert	Co-Executive Producer
2000	The Investigators	Executive Producer
2008	Iron Ring (TV Series)	Executive Producer
2011	Tu Nite con Lorenzo Parro (TV Series)	Executive Producer
2011	Off Bowery (TV Series)	Executive Producer
2011-	Combate Americas	Executive Producer
