= Frankie Edgar vs. Gray Maynard =

Mixed martial arts rivalries

Tale of the Tape
- Date: April 2, 2008
- Title(s) on the line: UFC Lightweight Championship

Tale of the tape
Boxer	(United States) Frankie Edgar	(United States) Gray Maynard
Nickname	"The Answer"	"The Bully"
Hometown	Toms River, New Jersey	Las Vegas, Nevada
Pre-fight record	9–0	4–0 (1 NC)
Height	5 ft 6 in (1.68 m)	5 ft 8 in (1.73 m)
Weight	155 lb (70 kg)	155 lb (70 kg)
Style	Boxing; Wrestling; Brazilian jiu-jitsu	Boxing; Wrestling
Recognition	UFC Lightweight Champion	Undefeated Challenger

Frankie Edgar versus Gray Maynard is a series of Lightweight mixed martial arts bouts held by the Ultimate Fighting Championship (UFC). Between 2008 and 2011, the UFC booked three contests between the fighters. Edgar, the quicker of the two, utilized speed and precise striking. Maynard, the more accomplished wrestler, relied on power and ground control.

In April 2008, Maynard won their first meeting by decision. On January 1, 2011, the two met in a highly acclaimed rematch, in which Maynard challenged Edgar for the UFC Lightweight Championship. After the rematch resulted in a draw, Edgar won the third meeting by knockout in October 2011.

== Background ==
Prior to fighting in mixed martial arts, Frankie Edgar and Gray Maynard each competed in amateur wrestling. Edgar became an All-American at Clarion University, graduating in 2005. Maynard, a three-time All-American who competed in the NCAA Championships, graduated from Michigan State University in 2003. In making the transition to MMA, Edgar utilized a successful combination of boxing, speed, and wrestling. Maynard, a powerful striker, largely relied on his ability to out-wrestle opponents.

== First fight ==
- Date: April 2, 2008

Tale of the tape
Boxer	(United States) Frankie Edgar	(United States) Gray Maynard
Nickname	The Answer	The Bully
Hometown	Toms River, New Jersey	Phoenix, Arizona
Pre-fight record	9-0	5-0 (1)

Result
- Mayard wins by Unanimous Decision

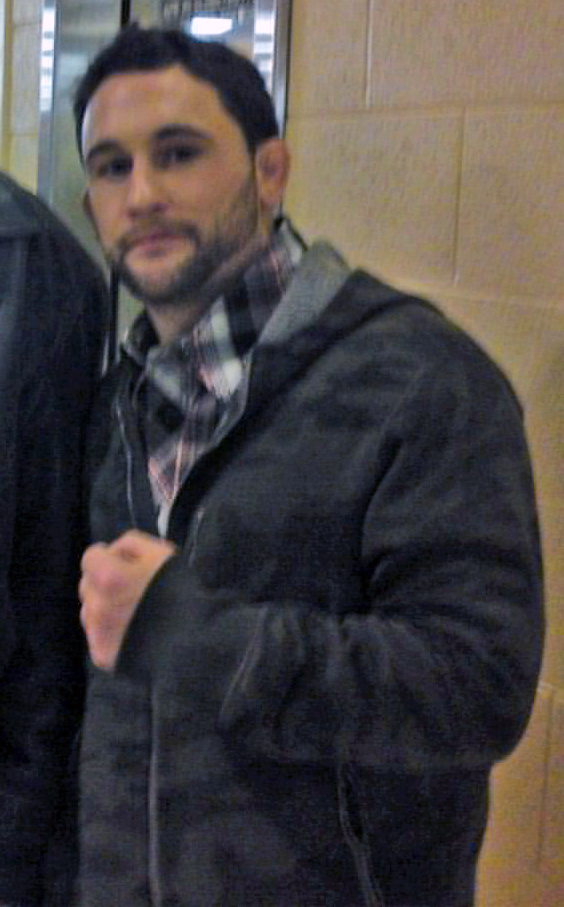
Edgar cited the first fight as an inspiration for new training.

After joining the Ultimate Fighting Championship's lightweight division, Gray Maynard and Frankie Edgar fought for the first time on April 2, 2008 at UFC Fight Night 13. The event took place in Broomfield, Colorado. At the time of this encounter, both were undefeated. Edgar expressed confidence prior to the event, but remarked that he was "expecting a tough fight." Maynard stated, "Unless I get a good clean one in for the KO, I'm expecting a three-round brawl."

Maynard utilized superior wrestling to earn a unanimous decision victory by a score of 30–27. In 2009, Edgar credited this fight as a positive turning point in his career. "The Maynard loss definitely opened my eyes. I started training with Ricardo Almeida and the [Renzo] Gracie team. That's where I've been the past year, and I think it had helped me tremendously." He also anticipated an eventual rematch with Maynard. "I think if [Maynard] keeps going where he's going, and I go where I plan on going, I think we'll eventually have to meet up. That would be something that I'd like to see in the future, but I'm not dwelling on it because I think if you dwell on losses you're not really going to focus on what you have ahead of yourself."

On April 10, 2010, Edgar won the UFC Lightweight Championship at UFC 112. He defended the belt in August at UFC 118, while Maynard won a title shot on the same night.

== Second fight ==
It wasn't just a "Fight of the Year" candidate. The five-round battle between Frankie Edgar and Gray Maynard was one of the UFC's best ever fights.

— Jamie Penick, MMA Torch

- Date: January 1, 2011

Tale of the tape
Boxer	(United States) Frankie Edgar	(United States) Gray Maynard
Nickname	The Answer	The Bully
Hometown	Toms River, New Jersey	Phoenix, Arizona
Pre-fight record	14-1	10-0 (1)

Result
- Split Draw

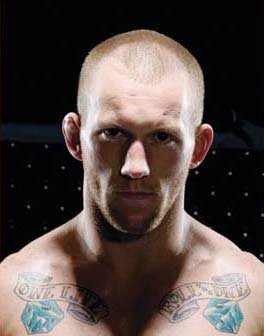
Maynard fought Edgar to a draw in their second fight.

Edgar and Maynard fought for the UFC Lightweight title on January 1, 2011 at UFC 125. The event took place in Maynard's hometown of Las Vegas, Nevada. In the opening round, Maynard appeared to be on the verge of winning the fight after stunning Edgar with a left hook and landing a series of follow-up punches. However, Edgar recovered and out-struck Maynard 22–8 in the second round, executing a slam in the process. The fight went to a judges' decision and was declared a draw. As a result, another rematch was scheduled.

Edgar and Maynard's second meeting earned "Fight of the Night" honors and was named "Fight of the Year" by the World MMA Awards. Sports Illustrated's Jeff Wagenheim called the contest "legendary", and noted it as "one of the most memorable fights in recent UFC history." Sherdog's Todd Martin lauded the bout as a classic. Sergio Non of USA Today praised Edgar's resiliency, stating, "The fact that Edgar made it out of the first round at all stands as a testament to his fighting instincts."

In the post-fight interview, Edgar remarked that he did not remember much of round one. Maynard commented, "I kind of punched myself out in the first, so round two, I couldn't really go that hard." He later cited nervousness as a factor, but noted that he had learned from the experience.

When asked about his outlook on a third fight, Edgar stated, "It's hard to say who has the mental edge, if anyone. You know, he may have tasted it from being so close, and now he's super-motivated. And there are a lot of ways for me to look at that last fight, too: as a guy who barely got through it or as a survivor. I don't know how he approaches it, but I know I'm fired up to settle things."

Both remarked that they were excited about fighting for a third time.

== Third fight ==
- Date: October 8, 2011

Tale of the tape
Boxer	(United States) Frankie Edgar	(United States) Gray Maynard
Nickname	The Answer	The Bully
Hometown	Toms River, New Jersey	Phoenix, Arizona
Pre-fight record	14-1-1	10-0-1 (1)

Result
- Frankie Edgar wins by Knockout at 3:54 of round 4

A third meeting between the two was initially scheduled for May at UFC 130. However, both men withdrew due to injury. The fight was rescheduled for UFC 136 and took place on October 8, 2011 in Houston, Texas. As in the second fight, round one featured a dominant performance by Maynard, who again staggered Edgar with a series of punches. However, Edgar recovered and went on to win the fight in round four by KO (punches) to retain the UFC Lightweight Championship, giving Maynard his first professional loss.

Following the third bout, Maynard posted a Twitter message in which he stated, "Hats off to Frank Edgar. Great competitor and person, true champ!" Edgar also posted a message via Twitter, stating, "I wanna wish Gray the best in the future, he was my toughest opponent as he forced me to bring the best out of myself."
