= 2011 in UFC =

Mixed martial arts events

Information
- First date: January 1, 2011
- Last date: December 30, 2011

Events
- Total events: 27
- UFC: 17
- UFC on Versus: 4
- UFC on Fox: 1
- UFC Fight Night: 3
- TUF Finale events: 2

Fights
- Total fights: 300
- Title fights: 13

Chronology
| 2010 in UFC | 2011 in UFC | 2012 in UFC |

The year 2011 was the 19th year in the history of the Ultimate Fighting Championship (UFC), a mixed martial arts promotion based in the United States. In 2011 the UFC held 27 events beginning with UFC 125: Resolution on January 1, 2011.

== 2011 UFC.com awards ==
2011 UFC.COM Awards
| No | Best Fighter | The Upsets | The Submissions | The Newcomers | The Knockouts | The Fights | The Import |
|---|---|---|---|---|---|---|---|
| 1 | Jon Jones | Tito Ortiz defeats Ryan Bader; UFC 132 | Frank Mir defeats Antônio Rogério Nogueira; UFC 140 | Chris Weidman | Cheick Kongo defeats Pat Barry; UFC Live: Kongo vs. Barry | Dan Henderson defeats Maurício Rua; UFC 139 | Dominick Cruz |
| 2 | Junior dos Santos | Johny Hendricks defeats Jon Fitch; UFC 142 | The Korean Zombie defeats Leonard Garcia; UFC Fight Night: Nogueira vs. Davis | Brian Ebersole | Sam Stout defeat Yves Edwards; UFC 131 | Frankie Edgar defeats Gray Maynard 2 UFC 125 | José Aldo |
| 3 | Anderson Silva | Dennis Siver defeats George Sotiropoulos at UFC 127 (Tie); Rafael dos Anjos defeats George Sotiropoulos at UFC 132 (Tie) | Pablo Garza defeats Yves Jabouin; UFC 129 | Tony Ferguson | John Makdessi defeats Kyle Watson; UFC 129 | Benson Henderson defeats Clay Guida; UFC on Fox: Velasquez vs. dos Santos | Benson Henderson |
| 4 | Frankie Edgar | Charlie Brenneman defeats Rick Story; UFC Live: Kongo vs. Barry | Joe Lauzon defeats Curt Warburton; UFC Live: Kongo vs. Barry | Jimy Hettes | Johny Hendricks defeats Jon Fitch; UFC 141 | Dominick Cruz defeats Urijah Faber 2 UFC 132 | Donald Cerrone |
| 5 | Benson Henderson | Stanislav Nedkov defeats Luiz Cané; UFC 134 | Nate Diaz defeats Takanori Gomi; UFC 135 | Diego Brandão (Tie); John Dodson (Tie) | Anderson Silva defeats Vitor Belfort; UFC 126 | Frankie Edgar defeats Gray Maynard; UFC 125 | Urijah Faber |
| 6 | Nick Diaz (Tie); Dan Henderson (Tie) | Brian Stann defeats Chris Leben; UFC 125 | Diego Brandão defeats Dennis Bermudez; The Ultimate Fighter 14 Finale | Mike Easton | Lyoto Machida defeats Randy Couture; UFC 129 | Nate Diaz defeats Donald Cerrone; UFC 141 | The Korean Zombie |
| 7 | Johny Hendricks | Demetrious Johnson defeats Miguel Torres; UFC 140 | Jon Jones defeats Lyoto Machida; UFC on Fuel TV: Sanchez vs. Ellenberger | Dave Herman | Frankie Edgar defeats Gray Maynard; UFC 125 | Diego Sanchez defeats Martin Kampmann; UFC Live: Sanchez vs. Kampmann | Dustin Poirier |
| 8 | Mark Muñoz | Rick Story defeats Thiago Alves; UFC 130 | Tito Ortiz defeats Ryan Bader; UFC 132 | Che Mills | The Korean Zombie defeats Mark Hominick; UFC 140 | Wanderlei Silva defeats Cung Le; UFC 139 | Michael McDonald |
| 9 | Donald Cerrone | Wanderlei Silva defeats Cung Le; UFC 139 | Terry Etim defeats Edward Faaloloto; UFC 138 | Walel Watson | Junior dos Santos defeats Cain Velasquez; UFC 166 | Kyle Kingsbury defeats Fábio Maldonado; The Ultimate Fighter 13 Finale | Chad Mendes |
| 10 | Dominick Cruz | Dustin Poirier defeats Josh Grispi; UFC 125 | Chris Lytle defeats Dan Hardy; UFC Live: Hardy vs. Lytle | Costas Philippou | Wanderlei Silva defeats Cung Le at UFC 139 (Tie); Anthony Johnson defeats Charlie Brenneman at UFC Live: Cruz vs. Johnson (Tie) | Edson Barboza defeats Anthony Njokuani; UFC 128 | Danny Castillo (Tie); Alistair Overeem (Tie) |
| Ref | | | | | | | |

== Debut UFC fighters ==
The following fighters fought their first UFC fight in 2011:

| ISO | Fighter | Division |
|---|---|---|
| (United States) | Aaron Rosa | Light Heavyweight |
| (United States) | Alex Caceres | Featherweight |
| (United States) | Alex Soto | Bantamweight |
| (Netherlands) | Alistair Overeem | Heavyweight |
| (Nigeria) | Anthony Njokuani | Lightweight |
| (United States) | Anthony Pettis | Lightweight |
| (United States) | Antonio Banuelos | Bantamweight |
| (United States) | Antonio McKee | Lightweight |
| (Poland) | Bart Palaszewski | Lightweight |
| (United States) | Benson Henderson | Lightweight |
| (England) | Brad Pickett | Bantamweight |
| (United States) | Brian Bowles | Bantamweight |
| (United States) | Brian Ebersole | Welterweight |
| (United States) | Bryan Caraway | Bantamweight |
| (United States) | Byron Bloodworth | Bantamweight |
| (United States) | Chad Mendes | Featherweight |
| (South Korea) | Chan Sung Jung | Featherweight |
| (United States) | Charlie Valencia | Bantamweight |
| (England) | Che Mills | Welterweight |
| (United States) | Chris Cariaso | Bantamweight |
| (United States) | Chris Cope | Welterweight |
| (United States) | Chris Weidman | Middleweight |
| (United States) | Clay Harvison | Lightweight |
| (United States) | Clifford Starks | Middleweight |
| (United States) | Cole Escovedo | Bantamweight |
| (Cyprus) | Costas Philippou | Middleweight |
| (United States) | Cub Swanson | Featherweight |
| (Vietnam) | Cung Le | Middleweight |
| (England) | Curt Warburton | Lightweight |
| (United States) | Damacio Page | Bantamweight |
| (United States) | Danny Castillo | Lightweight |
| (United States) | Danny Downes | Lightweight |
| (United States) | Darren Uyenoyama | Bantamweight |
| (United States) | Dave Herman | Heavyweight |
| (United States) | Demetrious Johnson | Bantamweight |
| (United States) | Dennis Bermudez | Featherweight |
| (Brazil) | Diego Brandão | Featherweight |
| (Brazil) | Diego Nunes | Featherweight |
| (United States) | Dominick Cruz | Bantamweight |
| (United States) | Donald Cerrone | Lightweight |
| (United States) | Donny Walker | Featherweight |
| (United States) | Dustin Jacoby | Middleweight |

| ISO | Fighter | Division |
|---|---|---|
| (United States) | Dustin Neace | Featherweight |
| (United States) | Dustin Pague | Bantamweight |
| (United States) | Dustin Poirier | Featherweight |
| (United States) | Eddie Wineland | Bantamweight |
| (United States) | Edward Faaloloto | Bantamweight |
| (United States) | Edwin Figueroa | Bantamweight |
| (Brazil) | Erick Silva | Welterweight |
| (United States) | Erik Koch | Featherweight |
| (Brazil) | Felipe Arantes | Bantamweight |
| (France) | Francis Carmont | Middleweight |
| (United States) | Francisco Rivera | Bantamweight |
| (Japan) | Hatsu Hioki | Featherweight |
| (Brazil) | Iuri Alcântara | Bantamweight |
| (United States) | Jake Hecht | Welterweight |
| (United States) | James Head | Welterweight |
| (England) | Jason Young | Featherweight |
| (United States) | Javier Vazquez | Featherweight |
| (United States) | Jeff Hougland | Bantamweight |
| (United States) | Jimy Hettes | Featherweight |
| (United States) | John Albert | Bantamweight |
| (United States) | John Cholish | Lightweight |
| (United States) | John Dodson | Bantamweight |
| (England) | John Maguire | Welterweight |
| (Norway) | John-Olav Einemo | Heavyweight |
| (United States) | Johnny Bedford | Bantamweight |
| (Brazil) | Johnny Eduardo | Bantamweight |
| (United States) | Jorge Lopez | Welterweight |
| (Brazil) | José Aldo | Featherweight |
| (United States) | Joseph Benavidez | Bantamweight |
| (United States) | Joseph Sandoval | Bantamweight |
| (United States) | Josh Clopton | Featherweight |
| (United States) | Josh Ferguson | Bantamweight |
| (United States) | Josh Grispi | Featherweight |
| (United States) | Justin Edwards | Welterweight |
| (Iran) | Kamal Shalorus | Lightweight |
| (United States) | Ken Stone | Bantamweight |
| (United States) | Kenny Robertson | Welterweight |
| (United States) | Lance Benoist | Welterweight |
| (United States) | Louis Gaudinot | Flyweight |
| (Brazil) | Luis Ramos | Welterweight |
| (Poland) | Maciej Jewtuszko | Lightweight |
| (United States) | Mackens Semerzier | Featherweight |

| ISO | Fighter | Division |
|---|---|---|
| (United States) | Marcus Brimage | Featherweight |
| (United States) | Matt Lucas | Lightweight |
| (United States) | Michael McDonald | Bantamweight |
| (United States) | Miguel Torres | Bantamweight |
| (United States) | Mike Easton | Bantamweight |
| (United States) | Mike Stumpf | Welterweight |
| (Canada) | Mitch Clarke | Lightweight |
| (Canada) | Nick Ring | Middleweight |
| (Japan) | Norifumi Yamamoto | Bantamweight |
| (Democratic Republic of the Congo) | Papy Abedi | Welterweight |
| (United States) | Paul Bradley | Welterweight |
| (England) | Phil De Fries | Heavyweight |
| (United States) | Ramsey Nijem | Lightweight |
| (Brazil) | Rani Yahya | Featherweight |
| (Brazil) | Raphael Assunção | Featherweight |
| (Brazil) | Renan Barão | Bantamweight |
| (United States) | Reuben Duran | Bantamweight |
| (United States) | Ricardo Lamas | Featherweight |
| (Japan) | Riki Fukuda | Middleweight |
| (United States) | Robbie Peralta | Featherweight |
| (Canada) | Roland Delorme | Bantamweight |
| (Brazil) | Ronny Markes | Middleweight |
| (Canada) | Ryan McGillivray | Welterweight |
| (United States) | Scott Jorgensen | Bantamweight |
| (United States) | Shamar Bailey | Lightweight |
| (United States) | Shane Roller | Lightweight |
| (Bulgaria) | Stanislav Nedkov | Light Heavyweight |
| (United States) | Stephen Bass | Featherweight |
| (United States) | Steven Siler | Featherweight |
| (United States) | Stipe Miocic | Heavyweight |
| (United States) | T.J. Dillashaw | Bantamweight |
| (Japan) | Takeya Mizugaki | Bantamweight |
| (England) | Tom Blackledge | Light Heavyweight |
| (United States) | Tony Ferguson | Lightweight |
| (United States) | Urijah Faber | Bantamweight |
| (Brazil) | Vagner Rocha | Lightweight |
| (England) | Vaughan Lee | Bantamweight |
| (United States) | Walel Watson | Bantamweight |
| (Brazil) | Willamy Freire | Lightweight |
| (Canada) | Yves Jabouin | Bantamweight |
| (China) | Zhang Tiequan | Lightweight |

== The Ultimate Fighter ==
| Season | Finale | Division | Winner | Runner-up |
|---|---|---|---|---|
| TUF 13: Team Lesnar vs. Team dos Santos | Jun 4, 2011 | Welterweight | Tony Ferguson | Ramsey Nijem |
| TUF 14: Team Bisping vs. Team Miller | Dec 3, 2011 | Bantamweight | John Dodson | T.J. Dillashaw |
| TUF 14: Team Bisping vs. Team Miller | Dec 3, 2011 | Featherweight | Diego Brandao | Dennis Bermudez |

== Title fights ==
Title fights in 2011
| Weight class | | | | Method | Round | Time | Event | Notes |
|---|---|---|---|---|---|---|---|---|
| Lightweight | Frankie Edgar (c) | vs. | Gray Maynard | Draw (split) (46–48, 48–46, 47–47) | 5 | 5:00 | UFC 125 | (Note: For the UFC Lightweight Championship.) |
| Middleweight | Anderson Silva (c) | def. | Vitor Belfort | KO (front kick and punches) | 1 | 3:25 | UFC 126 | (Note: For the UFC Middleweight Championship.) |
| Light Heavyweight | Jon Jones | def. | Maurício Rua (c) | TKO (knees and punches) | 3 | 2:37 | UFC 128 | (Note: For the UFC Light Heavyweight Championship.) |
| Featherweight | José Aldo (c) | def. | Mark Hominick | Decision (unanimous) (48–45, 48–46, 49–46) | 5 | 5:00 | UFC 129 | (Note: For the UFC Featherweight Championship.) |
| Welterweight | Georges St-Pierre (c) | def. | Jake Shields | Decision (unanimous) (50–45, 48–47, 48–47) | 5 | 5:00 | UFC 129 | (Note: For the UFC Welterweight Championship.) |
| Bantamweight | Dominick Cruz (c) | def. | Urijah Faber | Decision (unanimous) (50–45, 49–46, 48–47) | 5 | 5:00 | UFC 132 | (Note: For the UFC Bantamweight Championship.) |
| Middleweight | Anderson Silva (c) | def. | Yushin Okami | TKO (punches) | 2 | 2:04 | UFC 134 | (Note: For the UFC Middleweight Championship.) |
| Light Heavyweight | Jon Jones (c) | def. | Quinton Jackson | Submission (rear-naked choke) | 4 | 1:14 | UFC 135 | (Note: For the UFC Light Heavyweight Championship.) |
| Bantamweight | Dominick Cruz (c) | def | Demetrious Johnson | Decision (unanimous) (50–45, 49–46, 50–45) | 5 | 5:00 | UFC on Versus 6 | (Note: For the UFC Bantamweight Championship.) |
| Featherweight | José Aldo (c) | def. | Kenny Florian | Decision (unanimous) (49–46, 49–46, 49–46) | 5 | 5:00 | UFC 136 | (Note: For the UFC Featherweight Championship.) |
| Lightweight | Frankie Edgar (c) | def. | Gray Maynard | KO (punches) | 4 | 3:54 | UFC 136 | (Note: For the UFC Lightweight Championship.) |
| Heavyweight | Junior dos Santos | def. | Cain Velasquez (c) | KO (punches) | 1 | 1:04 | UFC on Fox 1 | (Note: For the UFC Heavyweight Championship.) |
| Light Heavyweight | Jon Jones (c) | def. | Lyoto Machida | Technical Submission (guillotine choke) | 2 | 4:26 | UFC 140 | (Note: For the UFC Light Heavyweight Championship.) |

== Events list ==
| # | Event | Date | Venue | Location | Attendance |
|---|---|---|---|---|---|
| 193 | UFC 141: Lesnar vs. Overeem | Dec 30, 2011 | MGM Grand Garden Arena | Las Vegas, Nevada, U.S. | 13,793 |
| 192 | UFC 140: Jones vs. Machida | Dec 10, 2011 | Air Canada Centre | Toronto, Ontario, Canada | 18,303 |
| 191 | The Ultimate Fighter: Team Bisping vs. Team Miller Finale | Dec 3, 2011 | Palms Casino Resort | Las Vegas, Nevada, U.S. | 1,909 |
| 190 | UFC 139: Shogun vs. Henderson | Nov 19, 2011 | HP Pavilion | San Jose, California, U.S. | 13,832 |
| 189 | UFC on Fox: Velasquez vs. dos Santos | Nov 12, 2011 | Honda Center | Anaheim, California, U.S. | 11,607 |
| 188 | UFC 138: Leben vs. Munoz | Nov 5, 2011 | LG Arena | Birmingham, England, U.K. | 10,823 |
| 187 | UFC 137: Penn vs. Diaz | Oct 29, 2011 | Mandalay Bay Events Center | Las Vegas, Nevada, U.S. | 10,313 |
| 186 | UFC 136: Edgar vs. Maynard III | Oct 8, 2011 | Toyota Center | Houston, Texas, U.S. | 16,164 |
| 185 | UFC Live: Cruz vs. Johnson | Oct 1, 2011 | Verizon Center | Washington, D.C., U.S. | 9,380 |
| 184 | UFC 135: Jones vs. Rampage | Sep 24, 2011 | Pepsi Center | Denver, Colorado, U.S. | 16,344 |
| 183 | UFC Fight Night: Shields vs. Ellenberger | Sep 17, 2011 | Ernest N. Morial Convention Center | New Orleans, Louisiana, U.S. | 7,112 |
| 182 | UFC 134: Silva vs. Okami | Aug 27, 2011 | HSBC Arena | Rio de Janeiro, Brazil | 14,000 |
| 181 | UFC Live: Hardy vs. Lytle | Aug 14, 2011 | Bradley Center | Milwaukee, Wisconsin, U.S. | 6,751 |
| 180 | UFC 133: Evans vs. Ortiz | Aug 6, 2011 | Wells Fargo Center | Philadelphia, U.S. | 11,583 |
| 179 | UFC 132: Cruz vs. Faber | Jul 2, 2011 | MGM Grand Garden Arena | Las Vegas, Nevada, U.S. | 13,109 |
| 178 | UFC Live: Kongo vs. Barry | Jun 26, 2011 | Consol Energy Center | Pittsburgh, Pennsylvania, U.S. | 7,792 |
| 177 | UFC 131: dos Santos vs. Carwin | Jun 11, 2011 | Rogers Arena | Vancouver, British Columbia, Canada | 14,685 |
| 176 | The Ultimate Fighter: Team Lesnar vs. Team dos Santos Finale | Jun 4, 2011 | Palms Casino Resort | Las Vegas, Nevada, U.S. | 2,053 |
| 175 | UFC 130: Rampage vs. Hamill | May 28, 2011 | MGM Grand Garden Arena | Las Vegas, Nevada, U.S. | 12,753 |
| 174 | UFC 129: St-Pierre vs. Shields | Apr 30, 2011 | Rogers Centre | Toronto, Ontario, Canada | 55,724 |
| 173 | UFC Fight Night: Nogueira vs. Davis | Mar 26, 2011 | KeyArena | Seattle, U.S. | 13,741 |
| 172 | UFC 128: Shogun vs. Jones | Mar 19, 2011 | Prudential Center | Newark, New Jersey, U.S. | 12,619 |
| 171 | UFC Live: Sanchez vs. Kampmann | Mar 3, 2011 | KFC Yum! Center | Louisville, Kentucky, U.S. | 8,319 |
| 170 | UFC 127: Penn vs. Fitch | Feb 27, 2011 | Acer Arena | Sydney, Australia | 18,186 |
| 169 | UFC 126: Silva vs. Belfort | Feb 5, 2011 | Mandalay Bay Events Center | Las Vegas, Nevada, U.S. | 10,893 |
| 168 | UFC: Fight for the Troops 2 | Jan 22, 2011 | Fort Hood | Fort Hood, Texas, U.S. | 3,200 |
| 167 | UFC 125: Resolution | Jan 1, 2011 | MGM Grand Garden Arena | Las Vegas, Nevada, U.S. | 12,874 |

== See also ==
- UFC
- List of UFC champions
- List of UFC events
