= Steve Cantwell =

American mixed martial arts fighter

- Born: Steven Francis Cantwell; August 12, 1986 (age 40); Long Beach, California, United States
- Other names: The Robot
- Nationality: American
- Height: 6 ft 2 in (1.88 m)
- Weight: 185 lb (84 kg; 13.2 st)
- Division: Light Heavyweight; Middleweight
- Reach: 75 in (191 cm)
- Fighting out of: Las Vegas, Nevada, United States
- Team: One Kick's Gym
- Rank: Black belt in Brazilian Jiu-Jitsu; Black belt in Kickboxing
- Years active: 2005–2012

Mixed martial arts record
- Total: 13
- Wins: 7
- By knockout: 3
- By submission: 4
- Losses: 6
- By knockout: 1
- By decision: 5

Other information
- Mixed martial arts record from Sherdog
- Last updated on: September 13, 2009

Steven Francis Cantwell (born August 12, 1986) is a retired American mixed martial artist. A professional competitor from 2005 until 2012, he competed for the UFC and for the UFC's sister organization, World Extreme Cagefighting. There, Cantwell was a one-time WEC Light Heavyweight Champion and he was the last man to hold the title before WEC's Light Heavyweight division was migrated into the UFC.

== Background ==
Cantwell was born in Long Beach, California and moved to Pahrump, Nevada at the age of 10. After being expelled middle school and high school because of fighting, Cantwell began training in kickboxing at the age of 16, under the tutelage of Nick Blumgren at One Kick's Gym.

== Mixed martial arts career ==
=== World Extreme Cagefighting ===
After acquiring a 3–0 record in smaller shows, Cantwell made his WEC debut at WEC 26: Condit vs. Alessio in 2007 against Brian Stann, where he suffered a quick TKO loss. After two subsequent victories, Cantwell again faced Stann, WEC Light Heavyweight Champion at WEC 35 and won by TKO in the second round. Shortly after Cantwell took the title, the WEC dropped both its Light Heavyweight and Middleweight divisions, making Cantwell the final WEC Light Heavyweight Champion.

=== Ultimate Fighting Championship ===
Later that year, Cantwell signed with the UFC, which is owned by the WEC's parent company Zuffa. Cantwell faced fellow UFC newcomer Razak Al-Hassan at UFC: Fight for the Troops an earned a technical submission victory by dislocating Al-Hassan's elbow in an armbar, causing referee Mario Yamasaki to stop the fight. Cantwell's celebration of the victory and post-fight comments sparked some criticism when he said, "I've been waiting so long to do that, you have no idea". He later apologized for his behavior.

He fought Luiz Cané at UFC 97, but lost the fight via unanimous decision.

Cantwell would next face Brian Stann at UFC Fight Night 13 in what would be their third fight. In their previous fight Cantwell had defeated Stann to become the last reigning WEC Light Heavyweight Champion. Cantwell lost the rubber match via unanimous decision.

Cantwell was expected to face Vladimir Matyushenko on January 2, 2010 at UFC 108, but pulled out of the bout for undisclosed reasons. Since there was no time to find a suitable replacement to face Matyushenko, the bout was called off. UFC President Dana White mentioned at the UFC 108 Pre-Fight Press Conference that Cantwell may never fight again, but refused to disclose what Cantwell's medical issues were.

With the questions surrounding his medical condition apparently cleared, Cantwell was expected to face UFC newcomer Ricardo Romero on July 3, 2010 at UFC 116. However, for unknown reasons, Cantwell was replaced by Seth Petruzelli.

Cantwell was expected to face Stanislav Nedkov on October 16, 2010 at UFC 120. However less than 48 hours before the event, Cantwell was forced off the card after suffering a knee injury during a pre-fight workout. With no time to find a suitable opponent for Nedkov, the bout was cancelled.

Cantwell faced Cyrille Diabaté on March 3, 2011 at UFC Live: Sanchez vs. Kampmann and lost the fight via unanimous decision.

Cantwell dropped to Middleweight for his next fight and faced Mike Massenzio on October 8, 2011 at UFC 136. He lost the fight via unanimous decision.

Cantwell faced Riki Fukuda on February 26, 2012 at UFC 144. He lost the fight via unanimous decision and was subsequently released from the promotion.

== Championships and Accomplishments ==
- World Extreme Cagefighting
  - WEC Light Heavyweight Championship (One time; final)
- Ultimate Fighting Championship
  - Submission of the Night (One time) vs. Razak Al-Hassan

== Mixed martial arts record ==
Professional record breakdown
13 matches	7 wins	6 losses
By knockout	3	1
By submission	4	0
By decision	0	5

Res.	Record	Opponent	Method	Event	Date	Round	Time	Location	Notes
Loss	7–6	Riki Fukuda	Decision (unanimous)	UFC 144	February 26, 2012	3	5:00	Saitama, Japan	
Loss	7–5	Mike Massenzio	Decision (unanimous)	UFC 136	October 8, 2011	3	5:00	Houston, Texas, United States	Middleweight debut.
Loss	7–4	Cyrille Diabaté	Decision (unanimous)	UFC Live: Sanchez vs. Kampmann	March 3, 2011	3	5:00	Louisville, Kentucky, United States	
Loss	7–3	Brian Stann	Decision (unanimous)	UFC Fight Night: Diaz vs. Guillard	September 16, 2009	3	5:00	Oklahoma City, Oklahoma, United States	
Loss	7–2	Luiz Cané	Decision (unanimous)	UFC 97	April 18, 2009	3	5:00	Montreal, Quebec, Canada	
Win	7–1	Razak Al-Hassan	Technical submission (armbar)	UFC: Fight for the Troops	December 10, 2008	1	4:04	Fayetteville, North Carolina, United States	Submission of the Night.
Win	6–1	Brian Stann	TKO (punches)	WEC 35: Condit vs. Miura	August 3, 2008	2	4:01	Las Vegas, Nevada, United States	Won the WEC Light Heavyweight Championship.
Win	5–1	Tim McKenzie	Submission (rear-naked choke)	WEC 33: Marshall vs. Stann	March 26, 2008	1	2:13	Las Vegas, Nevada, United States	
Win	4–1	Justin McElfresh	TKO (punches)	WEC 29	August 5, 2007	1	0:47	Las Vegas, Nevada, United States	
Loss	3–1	Brian Stann	TKO (punches)	WEC 26: Condit vs. Alessio	March 24, 2007	1	0:41	Las Vegas, Nevada, United States	
Win	3–0	Leonardo Pecanha	TKO (doctor stoppage)	Jungle Fight Europe	December 17, 2006	3	2:32	Ljubljana, Slovenia	
Win	2–0	Mike Ashford	Submission (armbar)	RITC 78: Back with a Vengeance	January 14, 2006	1	2:01	Glendale, Arizona, United States	
Win	1–0	Richie Hightower	Submission (armbar)	RITC 68: Hello Glendale!	April 23, 2005	1	2:45	Glendale, Arizona, United States	

Preceded by Brian Stann	7th WEC Light Heavyweight Champion; August 3, 2008 – December 3, 2008	Vacant WEC Light Heavyweight division was dissolved into the UFC
