= Frankie Edgar =

American mixed martial artist (born 1981)

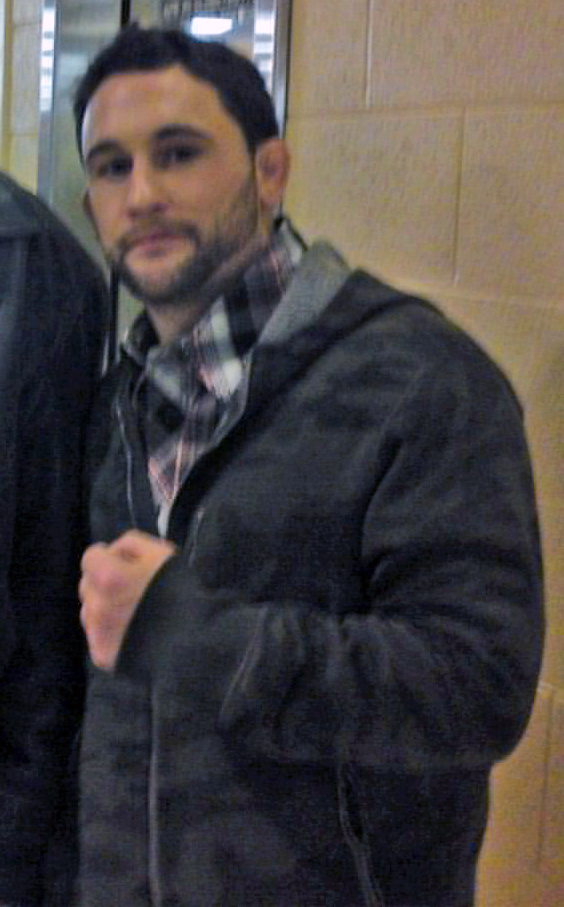
- Edgar in 2012
- Born: October 16, 1981 (age 45); Toms River, New Jersey, U.S.
- Nickname: The Answer
- Height: 5 ft 6 in (1.68 m)
- Weight: 136 lb (62 kg; 9 st 10 lb)
- Division: Lightweight (2026–present); Bantamweight (2020–2022); Featherweight (2013–2019); Lightweight (2005–2012)
- Reach: 68 in (173 cm)
- Stance: Orthodox
- Fighting out of: Toms River, New Jersey, U.S.
- Team: Ricardo Almeida BJJ; KHK MMA Fight Team
- Trainer: Boxing: Mark Henry; Wrestling: Steve Rivera; Brazilian Jiu-Jitsu: Ricardo Almeida, Renzo Gracie; Muay Thai: Ajarn Phil Nurse
- Rank: 3rd degree black belt in Brazilian Jiu-Jitsu under Ricardo Almeida
- Wrestling: NCAA Division I Wrestling
- Years active: 2005–present

Mixed martial arts record
- Total: 36
- Wins: 24
- By knockout: 7
- By submission: 4
- By decision: 13
- Losses: 11
- By knockout: 5
- By decision: 6
- Draws: 1

Amateur record
- Total: 1
- Wins: 1
- By knockout: 1

Other information
- University: Clarion University of Pennsylvania
- Spouse: Renee
- Children: 3
- Notable school: Toms River High School East
- Website: frankieedgar.com
- Mixed martial arts record from Sherdog

Frank Edgar (born October 16, 1981) is an American wrestler and former professional mixed martial artist who competed in the Lightweight, Featherweight, and Bantamweight divisions of the Ultimate Fighting Championship (UFC), concluding his career as a Bantamweight. He is a former Lightweight Champion, and a multiple-time challenger for the UFC Featherweight Championship. Edgar also competed in Reality Fighting, where he held the Lightweight Championship.

He is currently signed to Real American Freestyle (RAF), and debuted against Merab Dvalishvili at RAF 09 on May 30, 2026. Edgar wrestled collegiately for Clarion University of Pennsylvania, where he was a four-time NCAA Division I National qualifier.

== Early life ==
The oldest of three children, Edgar was born and raised in Toms River, New Jersey, on October 16, 1981, to Mary (née Annese) and Frank Edgar. He wrestled at Toms River High School East, making it to the New Jersey state championship tournament on three occasions, placing second as a junior and fifth as a senior. Edgar then competed in the NHSCA Senior Nationals, placing second before he graduated high school. He continued wrestling at Clarion University of Pennsylvania, where he qualified for the nationals all four years there. Edgar graduated from Clarion University of Pennsylvania with a degree in political science.

== Mixed martial arts career ==
=== Early career ===
Edgar entered his first mixed martial arts fight with only a few weeks of training outside of his wrestling background. Edgar originally trained with Rob Guarino of Rhino Fight Team, but today he is part of the Gracie system under Ricardo Almeida in Hamilton, New Jersey, who is part of the Gracie Barra team. Since seventh grade Edgar has wrestled with Steve Rivera at Elite Wrestling NJ in Jackson, New Jersey. His boxing trainer is Mark Henry of Millstone, New Jersey.

=== Ultimate Fighting Championship ===
Edgar amassed a 5–0 record before trying out for season five of The Ultimate Fighter. Edgar tried out in front of Ultimate Fighting Championship (UFC) president Dana White and matchmaker Joe Silva, but was not selected to be on the show. However, a month later the UFC contacted Edgar and asked if he would accept a fight with fellow undefeated fighter Tyson Griffin at UFC 67. Griffin caught Edgar in a deep kneebar at the end of the fight, but Edgar refused to tap and lasted out the remainder of the round to win by unanimous decision. The fight has been frequently rebroadcast on UFC Unleashed. This fight earned him his first Fight of the Night award.

Edgar followed up with a first-round TKO victory over Mark Bocek at UFC 73. He made his main card debut at UFC 78 against veteran fighter Spencer Fisher and won via unanimous decision.

Edgar suffered his first loss at UFC Fight Night 13 against Gray Maynard. This fight marked the first bout of a series. Maynard used his size and wrestling skill to overpower Edgar en route to a unanimous decision. Edgar rebounded with another Fight of the Night victory against Hermes França at UFC Fight Night 14. This fight earned him a $25,000 Fight of the Night award.

Edgar then defeated former UFC Lightweight Champion Sean Sherk, outworking him all three rounds to earn the unanimous decision victory over the stronger and heavier fighter.

Edgar was expected to face Kurt Pellegrino on December 5, 2009, at The Ultimate Fighter 10 Finale, but Pellegrino was forced to withdraw due to an injury. Matt Veach was named as Pellegrino's replacement, moving up from an undercard bout. After being on the defensive for most of the first round, Edgar became the aggressor in the second round by punishing Veach with strikes, Ultimately knocking Veach down with a straight right, Edgar then proceeded to take Veach's back and finishing him with a rear naked choke at 2:22 into the second round. This fight earned him another Fight of the Night award.

==== UFC Lightweight Champion ====
At UFC 112, Edgar was matched against Lightweight Champion B.J. Penn. After a long, back-and-forth, predominantly standing fight, the judges' scorecards were called on for a decision. The scores were (50–45, 49–46 and 48–47) in favor of Edgar. The unanimous decision win awarded him the UFC Lightweight Championship. 8 of 9 media outlets scored the bout in favor of Penn.

On June 24, 2010, ESPN announced Edgar as a nominee for Best Upset of the Year at the 2010 ESPY Awards.

The bout at UFC 112 was deemed close enough that Edgar's first title defense took the form of a UFC 118 rematch against Penn on August 28, 2010. Edgar defeated Penn via unanimous decision to retain the UFC Lightweight Championship, this time with no controversy after taking Penn down multiple times and out-striking him throughout all five rounds. All three judges scored the bout 50–45 for Edgar, making him the second fighter to defeat Penn in the Lightweight division (the other being Jens Pulver) and the second fighter ever to beat Penn twice (the other being Georges St-Pierre).

Edgar's next title defense was against Gray Maynard, the only man to have defeated Edgar, in a rematch from UFC Fight Night 13. Maynard earned the #1 contender spot at UFC 118 with a win over Kenny Florian. The bout took place on January 1, 2011, at UFC 125, with the fight ending in a split draw (48–46 Maynard, 48–46 Edgar and 47–47). In the first round of the bout, Maynard dropped Edgar multiple times, but Edgar would survive. His fight with Maynard marks the third time in UFC history that a championship fight ended as a draw. This fight earned him another Fight of the Night award.

During the UFC 125 post–fight press conference, it was announced that Edgar's next opponent would be Anthony Pettis, the final WEC Lightweight Champion. However, less than two hours later UFC president Dana White announced a change of plans. Edgar was then scheduled to fight Gray Maynard for the third time at UFC 130. Dana White confirmed on May 9, 2011, that both Edgar and Maynard had sustained injuries and that their bout was pulled from event. The fight was rescheduled as the main event of UFC 136. After a similar first round to their bout at UFC 125, Edgar won via knockout. This fight earned him a $75,000 Knockout of the Night award.

Edgar faced Benson Henderson on February 26, 2012, at UFC 144. Henderson defeated Edgar via unanimous decision to become the new UFC Lightweight Champion. Both participants earned Fight of the Night honors for their performance.

A rematch with Henderson took place on August 11, 2012, at UFC 150. In a bout that was very tightly contested, Henderson defeated Edgar again, this time via split decision.

==== Move to featherweight division ====
On the August 21, 2012, edition of UFC Tonight it was revealed that Edgar had announced his intentions to move to the featherweight division.

Edgar was briefly linked to a December 2012 bout with Ricardo Lamas, but it was scrapped after Edgar replaced the injured Erik Koch to face champion José Aldo for the UFC Featherweight Championship on October 13, 2012, at UFC 153 On September 11, Aldo pulled out of the match with a foot injury.

The bout with Aldo was rescheduled for UFC 156, where Edgar lost to Aldo via a unanimous decision. Both men earned Fight of the Night honors for their performances.

Edgar faced Charles Oliveira on July 6, 2013, at UFC 162 in his first non-title bout since 2009. Edgar won via unanimous decision snapping his three fight losing streak. Both fighters received Fight of the Night honors.

On September 11, 2013, the UFC announced during UFC Tonight, that Edgar would coach against former two-time opponent, B.J. Penn for the 19th season of The Ultimate Fighter. The season aired on Fox Sports 1, and the two coaches faced each other for the third time on July 6, 2014, at The Ultimate Fighter 19 Finale. Edgar won the one-sided bout by TKO in the third round.

Edgar next faced Cub Swanson on November 22, 2014, at UFC Fight Night 57. Edgar dominated the fight and finished Swanson in the fifth round via submission with only 4 seconds left in the fight. The win also earned Edgar his first Performance of the Night bonus award.

A long speculated "superfight" with former WEC Featherweight Champion Urijah Faber took place on May 16, 2015, at UFC Fight Night 66. After speculation as to what weight class the bout was to be contested, either Featherweight, Bantamweight or at a catchweight of somewhere in between, it was announced that the bout would be contested at Featherweight. Edgar won the fight via unanimous decision.

Edgar faced Chad Mendes on December 11, 2015, at The Ultimate Fighter 22 Finale. Edgar won the fight by knockout in the first round. The win also earned Edgar his second Performance of the Night bonus award.

Edgar next faced José Aldo in a rematch on July 9, 2016, at UFC 200 for the interim UFC Featherweight Championship. Aldo again defeated Edgar via unanimous decision.

Edgar faced Jeremy Stephens on November 12, 2016, at UFC 205. He won the fight via unanimous decision despite being knocked down by a head kick in the second round.

Edgar faced Yair Rodríguez on May 13, 2017, at UFC 211. After a dominant first two rounds, Edgar won the fight via TKO due to doctor stoppage between the second and third rounds due to the swelling on the left eye of Rodríguez. Edgar dedicated this fight to his teammate Nick Catone and his wife Marjorie who lost their baby the same week.

Edgar was scheduled to face Max Holloway for the UFC Featherweight Championship on December 2, 2017, at UFC 218; however, on November 8, 2017, he pulled out from the fight, citing injury. The pairing with Holloway was rescheduled and was expected to take place on March 3, 2018, at UFC 222. In turn, Holloway pulled out of this bout on February 3, due to a leg injury and the matchup was scrapped. Edgar eventually faced Brian Ortega on the card. Edgar lost the fight via knockout in the first round, the first stoppage loss of his career.

Edgar faced Cub Swanson in a rematch on April 21, 2018, at UFC Fight Night 128. He won the fight via unanimous decision.

Edgar was scheduled to face Chan Sung Jung on November 10, 2018, at UFC Fight Night 139. However, it was reported on October 26, 2018, that Edgar was pulled from the bout due to a torn bicep muscle and he was replaced by Yair Rodríguez.

A UFC Featherweight title bout against Max Holloway was scheduled a third time and eventually took place on July 27, 2019, in the main event at UFC 240. Edgar lost the fight via unanimous decision.

Edgar was scheduled to face Cory Sandhagen in a bantamweight bout on January 25, 2020, at UFC Fight Night 166. However, Edgar was removed from that bout in favor of featherweight pairing against Chan Sung Jung a month earlier at UFC on ESPN+ 23 after Jung's original opponent, Brian Ortega, pulled out due to injury. Edgar lost the fight via technical knockout in the first round.

==== Move to Bantamweight ====
With one fight left on his contract, Edgar signed a new, multi–fight contract with the UFC.

Edgar was scheduled to make his bantamweight debut and face Pedro Munhoz on July 15, 2020, at UFC Fight Night 172. However, on July 6, 2020, it was announced that Munhoz was pulled from the bout after testing positive for COVID-19. The pairing was rescheduled and took place on August 22, 2020, at UFC on ESPN 15. Edgar won the back-and-forth fight via split decision. 19 out of 23 media outlets scored the bout for Munhoz. This fight earned him the Fight of the Night award.

Edgar faced Cory Sandhagen at UFC Fight Night 184 on February 6, 2021. He lost the fight via knockout in the opening minute of the fight.

Edgar faced Marlon Vera on November 6, 2021, at UFC 268. After having initial success with his wrestling, Edgar lost the fight via front kick knockout in round three.

Edgar faced Chris Gutiérrez in his retirement fight on November 12, 2022, at UFC 281. He lost the bout after getting knocked out with a knee in the first round.

== Career outside UFC ==
=== KHK MMA Fight Team ===
Edgar is signed as a part of KHK MMA Fight Team, a Bahrain-based stable of international and Bahraini fighters financially backed by team founder Khalid bin Hamad Al Khalifa, First Deputy President of the Supreme Council for Youth and Sports in the Kingdom of Bahrain. Bahrain hosted the training camp ahead of his main event clash with Chad Mendes in Las Vegas, Nevada, at the Ultimate Fighter 22 Finale.

=== Commentary career ===
On December 21, 2016, Edgar signed with Brave Combat Federation to make his on-camera debut as a color commentator. His first event commentating was Brave 3: Battle in Brazil, on March 18, 2017, where he was paired alongside Cyrus Fees, Brave's play-by-play commentator in calling the 10-bout fight card hosted in Curitiba, Brazil.

=== Bare knuckle boxing ===
On August 19, 2025, it was announced that Edgar would be coming out of retirement to face Jimmie Rivera in Bare Knuckle Fighting Championship's BKFC 82 event in his home state of New Jersey on October 4. However, for undisclosed reasons, Edgar pulled out and was replaced by Timmy Mason.

== Freestyle wrestling career ==
On April 27, 2026, it was announced that Edgar would be coming out of retirement to face Merab Dvalishvili at Real American Freestyle's RAF 09 event on May 30, 2026. The match followed through, and Edgar lost to Merab via techncial fall (1-12).

Edgar faced Clay Guida on July 18, 2026 at RAF 11 and won by decision.

== Other media ==
Edgar was a featured fighter on True Life: I'm a Mixed Martial Artist leading up to his first fight with Maynard. He appears in all three "UFC Undisputed" video games (2009, 2010, UFC Undisputed 3) and also EA Sports UFC, EA Sports UFC 2, EA Sports UFC 3 and EA Sports UFC 4.

== Personal life ==
Edgar is of predominantly Italian descent through his Italian-born mother, stepfather and paternal grandfather, but also has some German ancestry on his biological father's side as well.

Outside of his mixed martial arts career, Edgar is an assistant coach for the Rutgers University wrestling team.

Edgar and his wife, Renee, were married ten days after UFC Fight Night 13. They have two sons—Francesco (born in January 2009) and Santino James (born in May 2010). They also have one daughter—Valentina (born in June 2014). The family resides in Toms River, New Jersey.

== Championships and accomplishments ==
- Ultimate Fighting Championship
  - UFC Hall of Fame (Modern Wing, Class of 2024)
  - UFC Lightweight Championship (One time)
    - Three successful title defenses
    - Tied (Jens Pulver & Justin Gaethje) for third most UFC lightweight title fight wins (5)
      - Tied (B.J. Penn, Benson Henderson & Khabib Nurmagomedov) for the second most consecutive UFC lightweight title defenses (3) (behind Islam Makhachev)
  - Fight of the Night (Eight times) vs. Tyson Griffin, Hermes França, Matt Veach, Gray Maynard 2, Benson Henderson, José Aldo, Charles Oliveira and Pedro Munhoz
    - Tied (Nate Diaz & Cub Swanson) for fourth most Fight of the Night bonuses in UFC history (8)
  - Knockout of the Night (One time) vs. Gray Maynard 3
  - Performance of the Night (Two times) vs. Cub Swanson 1 and Chad Mendes
  - Third longest total fight time in UFC history (7:57:10)
  - Tied for sixth most unanimous decision wins in UFC history (10)
  - UFC.com Awards
    - 2007: Ranked No. 4 Fighter of the Year & Ranked No. 2 Fight of the Year vs. Tyson Griffin
    - 2010: Fighter of the Year & Upset of the Year vs. B.J. Penn 1
    - 2011: Half-Year Awards: Best Fight of the 1HY vs. Gray Maynard 2, Ranked No. 2 Fight of the Year vs. Gray Maynard 2, Ranked No. 4 Fighter of the Year, Ranked No. 7 Knockout of the Year vs. Gray Maynard 3 & Ranked No. 5 Fight of the Year vs. Gray Maynard 3
    - 2012: Ranked No. 4 Fight of the Year vs. Benson Henderson 1
    - 2015: Ranked No. 5 Knockout of the Year vs. Chad Mendes
    - 2020: Ranked No. 8 Fight of the Year vs. Pedro Munhoz
- Reality Fighting
  - Reality Fighting Lightweight Championship (One time)
    - One successful title defense
- Sherdog
  - Fight of the Year (2011) vs. Gray Maynard on January 1
  - 2011 All-Violence Second Team
  - 2014 All-Violence First Team
  - 2017 Beatdown of the Year vs. Yair Rodríguez
- World MMA Awards
  - 2011 Fight of the Year vs. Gray Maynard at UFC 125
- ESPN
  - 2012 Fight of the Year vs. Benson Henderson at UFC 144
- MMA Fighting
  - 2010 #2 Ranked Fighter of the Year
- Bloody Elbow
  - 2010 Performance of the Year vs. B.J. Penn 2 at UFC 118
- Bleacher Report
  - 2012 #2 Ranked Fight of the Year vs. Benson Henderson
- Inside MMA
  - 2011 Comeback of the Year Bazzie Award vs. Gray Maynard
- FIGHT! Magazine
  - 2007 Newcomer of the Year

== Mixed martial arts record ==
Professional record breakdown
36 matches	24 wins	11 losses
By knockout	7	5
By submission	4	0
By decision	13	6
Draws	1	

Res.	Record	Opponent	Method	Event	Date	Round	Time	Location	Notes
Loss	24–11–1	Chris Gutiérrez	KO (knee)	UFC 281	November 12, 2022	1	2:01	New York City, New York, United States	
Loss	24–10–1	Marlon Vera	KO (front kick)	UFC 268	November 6, 2021	3	3:50	New York City, New York, United States	
Loss	24–9–1	Cory Sandhagen	KO (flying knee)	UFC Fight Night: Overeem vs. Volkov	February 6, 2021	1	0:28	Las Vegas, Nevada, United States	
Win	24–8–1	Pedro Munhoz	Decision (split)	UFC on ESPN: Munhoz vs. Edgar	August 22, 2020	5	5:00	Las Vegas, Nevada, United States	Bantamweight debut. Fight of the Night.
Loss	23–8–1	Jung Chan-sung	TKO (punches)	UFC Fight Night: Edgar vs. The Korean Zombie	December 21, 2019	1	3:18	Busan, South Korea	
Loss	23–7–1	Max Holloway	Decision (unanimous)	UFC 240	July 27, 2019	5	5:00	Edmonton, Alberta, Canada	For the UFC Featherweight Championship.
Win	23–6–1	Cub Swanson	Decision (unanimous)	UFC Fight Night: Barboza vs. Lee	April 21, 2018	3	5:00	Atlantic City, New Jersey, United States	
Loss	22–6–1	Brian Ortega	KO (punch)	UFC 222	March 3, 2018	1	4:44	Las Vegas, Nevada, United States	
Win	22–5–1	Yair Rodríguez	TKO (doctor stoppage)	UFC 211	May 13, 2017	2	5:00	Dallas, Texas, United States	
Win	21–5–1	Jeremy Stephens	Decision (unanimous)	UFC 205	November 12, 2016	3	5:00	New York City, New York, United States	
Loss	20–5–1	José Aldo	Decision (unanimous)	UFC 200	July 9, 2016	5	5:00	Las Vegas, Nevada, United States	For the interim UFC Featherweight Championship.
Win	20–4–1	Chad Mendes	KO (punch)	The Ultimate Fighter: Team McGregor vs. Team Faber Finale	December 11, 2015	1	2:28	Las Vegas, Nevada, United States	Performance of the Night.
Win	19–4–1	Urijah Faber	Decision (unanimous)	UFC Fight Night: Edgar vs. Faber	May 16, 2015	5	5:00	Pasay, Philippines	
Win	18–4–1	Cub Swanson	Submission (neck crank)	UFC Fight Night: Edgar vs. Swanson	November 22, 2014	5	4:56	Austin, Texas, United States	Performance of the Night.
Win	17–4–1	B.J. Penn	TKO (punches)	The Ultimate Fighter: Team Edgar vs. Team Penn Finale	July 6, 2014	3	4:16	Las Vegas, Nevada, United States	
Win	16–4–1	Charles Oliveira	Decision (unanimous)	UFC 162	July 6, 2013	3	5:00	Las Vegas, Nevada, United States	Fight of the Night.
Loss	15–4–1	José Aldo	Decision (unanimous)	UFC 156	February 2, 2013	5	5:00	Las Vegas, Nevada, United States	Featherweight debut. For the UFC Featherweight Championship. Fight of the Night.
Loss	15–3–1	Benson Henderson	Decision (split)	UFC 150	August 11, 2012	5	5:00	Denver, Colorado, United States	For the UFC Lightweight Championship.
Loss	15–2–1	Benson Henderson	Decision (unanimous)	UFC 144	February 26, 2012	5	5:00	Saitama, Japan	Lost the UFC Lightweight Championship. Fight of the Night.
Win	15–1–1	Gray Maynard	KO (punches)	UFC 136	October 8, 2011	4	3:54	Houston, Texas, United States	Defended the UFC Lightweight Championship. Knockout of the Night.
Draw	14–1–1	Gray Maynard	Draw (split)	UFC 125	January 1, 2011	5	5:00	Las Vegas, Nevada, United States	Retained the UFC Lightweight Championship. Fight of the Night.
Win	14–1	B.J. Penn	Decision (unanimous)	UFC 118	August 28, 2010	5	5:00	Boston, Massachusetts, United States	Defended the UFC Lightweight Championship.
Win	13–1	B.J. Penn	Decision (unanimous)	UFC 112	April 10, 2010	5	5:00	Abu Dhabi, United Arab Emirates	Won the UFC Lightweight Championship.
Win	12–1	Matt Veach	Submission (rear-naked choke)	The Ultimate Fighter: Heavyweights Finale	December 5, 2009	2	2:22	Las Vegas, Nevada, United States	Fight of the Night.
Win	11–1	Sean Sherk	Decision (unanimous)	UFC 98	May 23, 2009	3	5:00	Las Vegas, Nevada, United States	
Win	10–1	Hermes França	Decision (unanimous)	UFC Fight Night: Silva vs. Irvin	July 19, 2008	3	5:00	Las Vegas, Nevada, United States	Fight of the Night.
Loss	9–1	Gray Maynard	Decision (unanimous)	UFC Fight Night: Florian vs. Lauzon	April 2, 2008	3	5:00	Broomfield, Colorado, United States	
Win	9–0	Spencer Fisher	Decision (unanimous)	UFC 78	November 17, 2007	3	5:00	Newark, New Jersey, United States	
Win	8–0	Mark Bocek	TKO (punches)	UFC 73	July 7, 2007	1	4:55	Sacramento, California, United States	
Win	7–0	Tyson Griffin	Decision (unanimous)	UFC 67	February 3, 2007	3	5:00	Las Vegas, Nevada, United States	Fight of the Night.
Win	6–0	Jim Miller	Decision (unanimous)	Reality Fighting 14	November 18, 2006	3	5:00	Atlantic City, New Jersey, United States	Defended the Reality Fighting Lightweight Championship.
Win	5–0	Deividas Taurosevičius	Decision (unanimous)	Reality Fighting 13: Battle at the Beach	August 5, 2006	3	5:00	Wildwood, New Jersey, United States	Won the Reality Fighting Lightweight Championship.
Win	4–0	Steve McCabe	Submission (guillotine choke)	Ring of Combat 10	April 14, 2006	1	2:37	Atlantic City, New Jersey, United States	
Win	3–0	Jerome Isip	Technical Submission (rear-naked choke)	SportFighting 2	December 10, 2005	1	3:26	Hoboken, New Jersey, United States	
Win	2–0	Mark Getto	TKO (punches)	Ring of Combat 9	October 29, 2005	1	4:21	Asbury Park, New Jersey, United States	
Win	1–0	Eric Uresk	TKO (punches)	Underground Combat League	July 10, 2005	1	3:38	The Bronx, New York, United States	

== NCAA record ==
NCAA Championships Matches
Res.	Record	Opponent	Score	Date	Event
2005 NCAA Championships at 141 lbs
Loss	2–6	Casio Pero	4–6 OT	March 18, 2005	2005 NCAA Division I Wrestling Championships
Loss	2–5	Nate Gallick	5–10	March 18, 2005	2005 NCAA Division I Wrestling Championships
Win	2–4	Ronald Tarquinio	4–2	March 18, 2005	2005 NCAA Division I Wrestling Championships
Win	1–4	Alex Tsirtsis	Major 10–2	March 18, 2005	2005 NCAA Division I Wrestling Championships
2004 NCAA Championships at 141 lbs
Loss	0–4	Cory Cooperman	Major 3–12	March 18, 2004	2004 NCAA Division I Wrestling Championship
Loss	0–3	Doug McGraw	3–4	March 18, 2004	2004 NCAA Division I Wrestling Championship
2003 NCAA Championships at 141 lbs
Loss	0–2	Ronaldo Tarquinio	3–5	March 20, 2003	2003 NCAA Division I Wrestling Championship
Loss	0–1	Jason Mester	2–3	March 20, 2003	2003 NCAA Division I Wrestling Championship

== Freestyle wrestling record ==
Freestyle matches
Res.	Record	Opponent	Score	Date	Event	Location
RAF 11 at 159 lb catchweight limit.
Win	1-1	(United States) Clay Guida	9–1	July 18, 2026	RAF 11: Tsarukyan vs. Covington	(United States) Milwaukee, Wisconsin
RAF 09 at 155 lb lightweight limit.
Loss	0-1	(Georgia (country)) Merab Dvalishvili	TF 1–12	May 30, 2026	RAF 09: Steveson vs. Romanov	(United States) Arlington, Texas

== Pay-per-view bouts ==
No.	Fight	Event	Date	City	Venue	PPV Buys
1.	Edgar vs. Penn 2	UFC 118	August 28, 2010	Boston, Massachusetts, United States	TD Garden	535,000
2.	Edgar vs. Maynard 2	UFC 125	January 1, 2011	Las Vegas, Nevada, United States	MGM Grand Garden Arena	270,000
3.	Edgar vs. Maynard 3	UFC 136	October 8, 2011	Houston, Texas, United States	Toyota Center	225,000
4.	Edgar vs. Henderson	UFC 144	February 26, 2012	Saitama, Japan	Saitama Super Arena	375,000
5.	Henderson vs. Edgar 2	UFC 150	August 11, 2012	Denver, Colorado, United States	Pepsi Center	190,000
6.	Aldo vs. Edgar	UFC 156	February 2, 2013	Paradise, Nevada, United States	Mandalay Bay Events Center	330,000
7.	Holloway vs. Edgar	UFC 240	July 27, 2019	Edmonton, Alberta, Canada	Rogers Place	Not Disclosed

== See also ==
- List of current UFC fighters
- List of male mixed martial artists

Achievements
Preceded by B.J. Penn	4th UFC Lightweight Champion; April 10, 2010 – February 26, 2012	Succeeded by Benson Henderson
