= UFC 130 =

UFC mixed martial arts event in 2011

UFC 130: Rampage vs. Hamill
- The poster for UFC 130: Rampage vs. Hamill
- Promotion: Ultimate Fighting Championship
- Date: May 28, 2011
- Venue: MGM Grand Garden Arena
- City: Las Vegas, Nevada
- Attendance: 12,753
- Total gate: $2,580,000
- Buyrate: 325,000

Event chronology
UFC 129: St-Pierre vs. Shields	UFC 130: Rampage vs. Hamill	The Ultimate Fighter: Team Lesnar vs. Team dos Santos Finale

UFC 130: Rampage vs. Hamill was a mixed martial arts event held by the Ultimate Fighting Championship on May 28, 2011, at the MGM Grand Garden Arena in Las Vegas, Nevada.

== Background ==
This event was to be the third meeting between Frankie Edgar and Gray Maynard and their second meeting for the UFC Lightweight Championship. The two met earlier in the year at UFC 125: Resolution with the fight ending in a split draw, and Edgar retaining his title. Their first encounter at UFC Fight Night: Florian vs. Lauzon saw Maynard win via unanimous decision.

It was later announced on May 9 that injuries to both forced the fight to be removed from the card. Edgar suffered broken ribs, while Maynard suffered a knee injury.

On February 9, it was rumored that Thiago Silva had been forced from his bout with Quinton "Rampage" Jackson and could be replaced by Rashad Evans. Silva stated that he was not injured and was looking forward to his bout with Jackson. Instead, information surfaced that Silva may have failed a pre-fight drug screening at UFC 125, which could have resulted in his suspension. It was then announced that the proposed Rashad Evans bout was never close to being signed, and that Rampage would face Matt Hamill.

Former Sengoku Middleweight Champion Jorge Santiago confirmed he has signed a contract with the UFC and returned to face Brian Stann at this event.

On April 20, Brad Pickett was forced to withdraw from his bout with Miguel Torres. Demetrious Johnson, who was set to fight Renan Barão on the undercard, stepped in as Pickett's replacement while Barão faced Cole Escovedo.

On April 27, Norifumi Yamamoto was forced out of his bout with Chris Cariaso due to injury. Michael McDonald, who was scheduled to take on Nick Pace at UFC 133, stepped in as Yamamoto's replacement.

Cody McKenzie was set to fight Bart Palaszewski in this event, but an injury forced him out of the card. UFC president Dana White later announced that Gleison Tibau would step up to replace McKenzie. Palaszewski was also injured and replaced by returning UFC veteran Rafaello Oliveira.

UFC 130 featured two preliminary fights live on Spike TV, and the remainder of the preliminary bouts streamed on Facebook.

== Results ==
Main card
Weight class				Method	Round	Time	Notes
Light Heavyweight	Quinton Jackson	def.	Matt Hamill	Decision (unanimous) (30–27, 30–27, 30–27)	3	5:00
Heavyweight	Frank Mir	def.	Roy Nelson	Decision (unanimous) (30–27, 30–27, 30–26)	3	5:00
Heavyweight	Travis Browne	def.	Stefan Struve	KO (punch)	1	4:11
Welterweight	Rick Story	def.	Thiago Alves	Decision (unanimous) (29–28, 29–28, 29–28)	3	5:00
Middleweight	Brian Stann	def.	Jorge Santiago	TKO (punches)	2	4:29
Preliminary card (Spike TV)
Weight class				Method	Round	Time	Notes
Bantamweight	Demetrious Johnson	def.	Miguel Torres	Decision (unanimous) (29–28, 29–28, 29–28)	3	5:00
Middleweight	Tim Boetsch	def.	Kendall Grove	Decision (unanimous) (30–27, 30–27, 30–27)	3	5:00
Preliminary card (Facebook)
Weight class				Method	Round	Time	Notes
Lightweight	Gleison Tibau	def.	Rafaello Oliveira	Submission (rear-naked choke)	2	3:28	(Note: This bout aired on the broadcast following the Jackson vs Hamill bout.)
Bantamweight	Michael McDonald	def.	Chris Cariaso	Decision (split) (27–30, 29–28, 29–28)	3	5:00
Bantamweight	Renan Barão	def.	Cole Escovedo	Decision (unanimous) (30–27, 30–27, 29–28)	3	5:00

== Bonus awards ==
The following fighters received $70,000 bonuses.

- Fight of the Night: Brian Stann vs. Jorge Santiago
- Knockout of the Night: Travis Browne
- Submission of the Night: Gleison Tibau

== Reported payout ==
The following is the reported payout to the fighters as reported to the Nevada State Athletic Commission. It does not include sponsor money or "locker room" bonuses often given by the UFC and also do not include the UFC's traditional "fight night" bonuses.

- Quinton Jackson: $250,000 (no win bonus) def. Matt Hamill: $32,000
- Frank Mir: $250,000 ($125,000 win bonus) def. Roy Nelson: $15,000
- Travis Browne: $16,000 ($8,000 win bonus) def. Stefan Struve: $21,000
- Rick Story: $34,000 ($17,000 win bonus) def. Thiago Alves: $33,000
- Brian Stann: $46,000 ($23,000 win bonus) def. Jorge Santiago: $36,000
- Demetrious Johnson: $12,000 ($6,000 win bonus) def. Miguel Torres: $30,000
- Tim Boetsch: $36,000 ($18,000 win bonus) def. Kendall Grove: $26,000
- Gleison Tibau: $50,000 ($25,000 win bonus) def. Rafaello Oliveira: $10,000
- Michael McDonald: $12,000 ($6,000 win bonus) def. Chris Cariaso: $4,000
- Renan Barão: $10,000 ($5,000 win bonus) def. Cole Escovedo: $6,000
