= Mike Massenzio =

American mixed martial arts fighter

- Born: Michelangelo Vito Massenzio; November 1, 1982 (age 43); Teaneck, New Jersey, U.S.
- Other names: The Master of Disaster
- Nationality: American
- Height: 6 ft 2 in (1.88 m)
- Weight: 185 lb (84 kg; 13.2 st)
- Division: Middleweight; Light Heavyweight
- Reach: 73 1/2 in (187 cm)
- Stance: Southpaw
- Fighting out of: Paterson, New Jersey, U.S.
- Team: Team Ironhorse MMA

Mixed martial arts record
- Total: 22
- Wins: 13
- By knockout: 2
- By submission: 6
- By decision: 5
- Losses: 9
- By knockout: 3
- By submission: 5
- By decision: 1

Other information
- Mixed martial arts record from Sherdog

Michelangelo Vito "Mike" Massenzio (born November 1, 1982) is an American mixed martial artist who competed as a Middleweight in the Ultimate Fighting Championship.

== Background ==
He wrestled in New Jersey and was a two-time high school state champion in 2000 (160 lbs.) and 2001 (171 lbs.) at St. Joseph Regional High School in Montvale, New Jersey. Additionally in 2001, Mike was the U.S. National High School Wrestling Champion. In 2003, he was the Runner-up at the Junior College National Tournament and was crowned the National Champion in 2004.

== Early career ==
In Jujitsu and Submission Grappling, Mike has won numerous competitions in both N.A.G.A. and Grappler's Quest. In 2006 he was crowned the N.A.G.A. World Champion in the Expert Division of the Submission fighting competition.

Mike is currently head coach for The Ridgewood Junior Wrestling Program in Ridgewood, New Jersey.

=== Ultimate Fighting Championship ===
Mike's first win for the promotion came over Drew McFedries via submission at UFC Fight Night: Diaz vs Neer in his UFC debut. However, Massenzio lost in his next bout to CB Dollaway on December 27, 2008, at UFC 92.

Massenzio then missed several months, before facing former WEC Light Heavyweight Champion Brian Stann, who was making his middleweight debut, on August 1, 2010, at UFC on Versus 2. Massenzio was submitted by a triangle choke midway through the final round. After second straight loss in the UFC he was released from the promotion.

=== Return to UFC ===
Massenzio next returned to the UFC replacing an injured Igor Pokrajac against Krzysztof Soszynski on June 11, 2011, at UFC 131. Massenzio took the fight at light heavyweight with only 3 days notice, despite normally fighting at middleweight. He lost the fight via unanimous decision (30–27, 30–26, 30–27).

Massenzio fought Steve Cantwell on October 8, 2011, at UFC 136. He won the fight via unanimous decision.

Massenzio faced Rousimar Palhares on January 14, 2012, at UFC 142 He lost the fight via submission when Palhares put him in a heel hook in the first round.

Massenzio faced Karlos Vemola on May 5, 2012, at UFC on Fox 3. He lost the bout in the second round due to a rear-naked choke and was subsequently released from the promotion once again.

== Championships and accomplishments ==
- Ultimate Fighting Championship
  - Fight of the Night (One time) vs. Brian Stann

== Mixed martial arts record ==
Professional record breakdown
22 matches	13 wins	9 losses
By knockout	2	3
By submission	6	5
By decision	5	1

Res.	Record	Opponent	Method	Event	Date	Round	Time	Location	Notes
Loss	13–9	Ariel Sepulveda	Submission (rear-naked choke)	Ring of Combat 44	April 5, 2013	3	1:14	Atlantic City, New Jersey, United States	
Loss	13–8	Ron Stallings	TKO (knee to the body)	Ring of Combat 42	September 14, 2012	1	4:03	Atlantic City, New Jersey, United States	For the ROC Middleweight Championship.
Loss	13–7	Karlos Vémola	Submission (rear-naked choke)	UFC on Fox: Diaz vs. Miller	May 5, 2012	2	1:07	East Rutherford, New Jersey, United States	
Loss	13–6	Rousimar Palhares	Submission (heel hook)	UFC 142	January 14, 2012	1	1:03	Rio de Janeiro, Brazil	
Win	13–5	Steve Cantwell	Decision (unanimous)	UFC 136	October 8, 2011	3	5:00	Houston, Texas, United States	Return to Middleweight.
Loss	12–5	Krzysztof Soszynski	Decision (unanimous)	UFC 131	June 11, 2011	3	5:00	Vancouver, British Columbia, Canada	Light Heavyweight debut.
Win	12–4	Nate Kittredge	TKO (punches)	Combat Zone 37: Kicking It at the Rock	April 29, 2011	2	3:32	Salem, New Hampshire, United States	
Loss	11–4	Brian Stann	Submission (triangle choke)	UFC Live: Jones vs. Matyushenko	August 1, 2010	3	3:10	San Diego, California, United States	Fight of the Night.
Loss	11–3	CB Dollaway	TKO (punches)	UFC 92	December 27, 2008	1	3:01	Las Vegas, Nevada, United States	
Win	11–2	Drew McFedries	Submission (kimura)	UFC Fight Night: Diaz vs Neer	September 17, 2008	1	1:28	Omaha, Nebraska, United States	
Loss	10–2	Danillo Villefort	Submission (kneebar)	IFL: Connecticut	May 16, 2008	1	3:25	Uncasville, Connecticut, United States	
Win	10–1	Lance Everson	Submission (guillotine choke)	Ring of Combat 17: Beast of the Northeast Finals	November 30, 2007	1	4:04	Atlantic City, New Jersey, United States	
Win	9–1	Erik Charles	Submission (north-south choke)	Ring of Combat 16: Beast of the Northeast Semi-Finals	October 26, 2007	1	1:18	Atlantic City, New Jersey, United States	
Win	8–1	Dustin Cook	Submission (rear-naked choke)	Ring of Combat 15: Beast of the Northeast Quarterfinals	September 7, 2007	2	2:21	Atlantic City, New Jersey, United States	
Win	7–1	Eric Tavares	Submission (rear-naked choke)	Ring of Combat 14: Tournament of Champions Finals	April 27, 2007	1	3:34	Atlantic City, New Jersey, United States	Catchweight (190 lbs) bout.
Win	6–1	Masakatsu Okuda	Decision (unanimous)	World Best Fighter: USA vs. Asia	February 3, 2007	3	N/A	Atlantic City, New Jersey, United States	
Win	5–1	Dante Rivera	Decision (unanimous)	Reality Fighting 13: Battle at the Beach 2006	August 5, 2006	3	5:00	Wildwood, New Jersey, United States	Won the vacant Reality Fighting Middleweight Championship.
Win	4–1	Dan Miller	Decision (split)	Reality Fighting 12: Return to Boardwalk Hall	April 29, 2006	3	3:00	Atlantic City, New Jersey, United States	
Win	3–1	Bill Scott	TKO (doctor stoppage)	Reality Fighting 11: Battle at Taj Mahal	February 11, 2006	1	3:00	Atlantic City, New Jersey, United States	
Win	2–1	Drew Puzon	Decision (majority)	Reality Fighting 10	November 19, 2005	2	5:00	Atlantic City, New Jersey, United States	
Loss	1–1	Jay Coleman	TKO (punches)	Reality Fighting 9: Battle at the Beach 2005	August 6, 2005	2	0:17	Wildwood, New Jersey, United States	
Win	1–0	Lionel Cortez	Submission (keylock)	Reality Fighting 8	April 2, 2005	1	2:05	Atlantic City, New Jersey, United States	
