= UFC 144 =

UFC mixed martial arts event in 2012

UFC 144: Edgar vs. Henderson
- The poster for UFC 144: Edgar vs. Henderson
- Promotion: Ultimate Fighting Championship
- Date: February 26, 2012
- Venue: Saitama Super Arena
- City: Saitama, Japan
- Attendance: 21,000 (paid: 18,000)
- Buyrate: 375,000

Event chronology
UFC on Fuel TV: Sanchez vs. Ellenberger	UFC 144: Edgar vs. Henderson	UFC on FX: Alves vs. Kampmann

UFC 144: Edgar vs. Henderson was a mixed martial arts pay-per-view event held by the Ultimate Fighting Championship on February 26, 2012, at the Saitama Super Arena in Saitama, Japan.

== Venue ==
UFC 144 was held at the Saitama Super Arena in the Chūō-ku central ward of Saitama City in Saitama Prefecture. The sellout event was held in the Super Arena's Main Stage Center Arena configuration, with a ticket cost of between ¥5,800 and ¥100,000 (ca. US$70 – US$1250).

== Background ==
UFC 144 marked the UFC's fifth appearance in Japan, their first event in Japan since UFC 29 in 2000, and its first event in Japan since the 2007 purchase of Pride Fighting Championships, which held many of its cards at Saitama Super Arena. The UFC event featured seven fights on the main card.

George Sotiropoulos was expected to face Takanori Gomi at this event, but was forced out of the bout with an injury and replaced by Eiji Mitsuoka.

Leonard Garcia was expected to face Zhang Tiequan at this event, but was forced out of the bout with an injury. Issei Tamura stepped in for Garcia and fought Zhang.

At the UFC 144 weigh ins, Quinton Jackson failed to make the 206 lb weight limit and came in 5 lbs overweight at 211 lbs. Jackson was fined 20 percent of his earnings and the bout was contested at a catchweight of 211 lb.

== Results ==
Main card
Weight class				Method	Round	Time	Notes
Lightweight	Benson Henderson	def	Frankie Edgar (c)	Decision (unanimous) (49–46, 48–47, 49–46)	5	5:00	(Note: For the UFC Lightweight Championship.)
Catchweight (211 lb)	Ryan Bader	def	Quinton Jackson	Decision (unanimous) (30–27, 30–27, 30–27)	3	5:00
Heavyweight	Mark Hunt	def	Cheick Kongo	TKO (punches)	1	2:11
Welterweight	Jake Shields	def	Yoshihiro Akiyama	Decision (unanimous) (30–27, 30–27, 30–27)	3	5:00
Middleweight	Tim Boetsch	def	Yushin Okami	TKO (punches)	3	0:54
Featherweight	Hatsu Hioki	def	Bart Palaszewski	Decision (unanimous) (30–27, 29–28, 29–28)	3	5:00
Lightweight	Anthony Pettis	def	Joe Lauzon	KO (head kick and punches)	1	1:21
Preliminary card (FX)
Lightweight	Takanori Gomi	def	Eiji Mitsuoka	TKO (punches)	2	2:21
Bantamweight	Vaughan Lee	def	Norifumi Yamamoto	Submission (armbar)	1	4:29
Middleweight	Riki Fukuda	def	Steve Cantwell	Decision (unanimous) (29–28, 30–27, 30–27)	3	5:00
Bantamweight	Chris Cariaso	def	Takeya Mizugaki	Decision (unanimous) (29–28, 29–28, 29–28)	3	5:00
Preliminary card (Facebook)
Featherweight	Issei Tamura	def	Zhang Tiequan	KO (punch)	2	0:32

== Bonus awards ==
The following fighters received $65,000 bonuses.

- Fight of the Night: Frankie Edgar vs. Benson Henderson
- Knockout of the Night: Anthony Pettis
- Submission of the Night: Vaughan Lee

== See also ==
- List of UFC events
- 2012 in UFC
