= Brian Stann =

American mixed martial arts fighter and color commentator

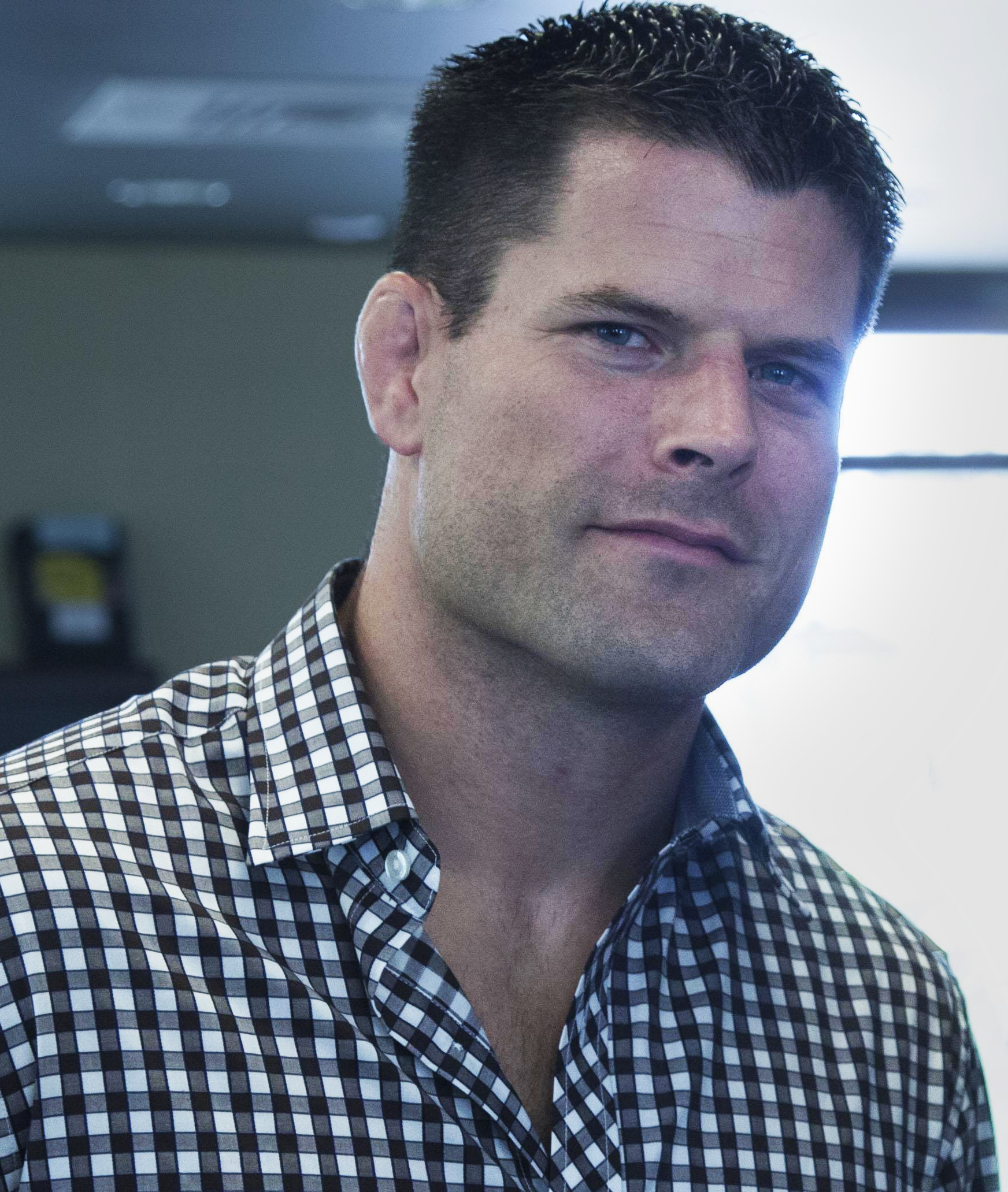
- Stann in 2013
- Born: Brian Michael Stann; September 24, 1980 (age 46); Fussa, Tokyo, Japan
- Other names: The All-American
- Nationality: American
- Height: 6 ft 1 in (185 cm)
- Weight: 185 lb (84 kg; 13 st 3 lb)
- Division: Middleweight (185 lb) (2010–2012); Light Heavyweight (205 lb) (2006–2010, 2013)
- Reach: 74 in (188 cm)
- Fighting out of: Scranton, Pennsylvania, U.S.
- Team: Jackson's Submission Fighting
- Rank: 3rd Degree Black Belt in MCMAP; Purple Belt in Brazilian jiu-jitsu
- Years active: 2006 – 2013

Mixed martial arts record
- Total: 18
- Wins: 12
- By knockout: 9
- By submission: 1
- By decision: 2
- Losses: 6
- By knockout: 2
- By submission: 2
- By decision: 2

Other information
- Website: http://www.brianstann.com/
- Mixed martial arts record from Sherdog
- Military career
- Allegiance: United States
- Branch: U.S. Marine Corps
- Service years: 2003–2008
- Rank: Captain
- Units: 2nd Mobile Assault Platoon, 3rd Battalion, 2nd Marines
- Conflicts: Iraq War; Battle of Al Qaim
- Other work: Professional Mixed martial artist
- Last updated on: October 11, 2011

Brian Michael Stann (born September 24, 1980) is an American former mixed martial artist and U.S. Marine who competed in the middleweight and light heavyweight divisions of the Ultimate Fighting Championship (UFC). He also competed in the light heavyweight division of World Extreme Cagefighting (WEC), where he is a former WEC Light Heavyweight Champion. He was also a color commentator for both the Ultimate Fighting Championship and ACC football games on Fox Sports Net.

== Background ==
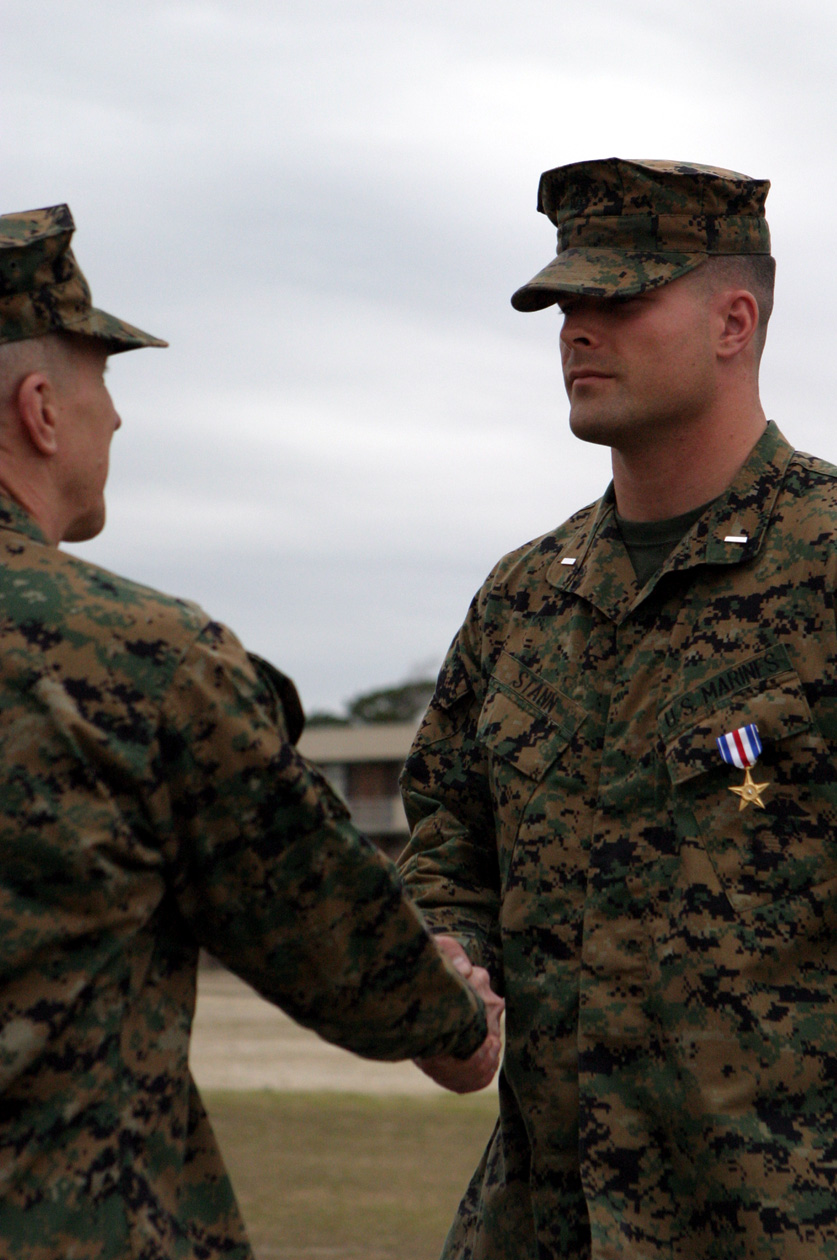
Stann being awarded his Silver Star in 2006

Stann was born at Yokota Air Base in Fussa, Tokyo, Japan, and grew up in Scranton, Pennsylvania. He graduated from Scranton Preparatory School and subsequently enrolled in the United States Naval Academy in 1999 (Class of 2003). While at the Naval Academy, he played football for the Midshipmen as a middle linebacker. Upon graduation, he was assigned as an infantry officer in the United States Marine Corps, eventually achieving the rank of captain.

On May 8, 2005, then-lieutenant Stann was assigned to the 3rd Battalion, 2nd Marines, commanding the 2nd Mobile Assault Platoon. During the Operation Matador (which took place during the Battle of Al-Qa'im), his unit was ambushed by insurgents while trying to secure the Ramana Bridge, near Karabilah. Stann and his unit held out for six days, under heavy attack, while coordinating air and tank support that eventually allowed them to be relieved on May 14, 2005. All 42 Marines in Stann's platoon survived. The following March, Stann was awarded the Silver Star, the nation's third-highest award for valor in combat. Part of the citation reads: "Second Lieutenant Stann personally directed two casualty operations, three vehicle recovery operations and multiple close air support missions under enemy small arms, machine gun and mortar fire in his 360-degree fight." This mission was shown on the episode, "Iraq's Most Wanted" on the History Channel show, Shootout!, in which Stann was interviewed. His actions were noted by President George W. Bush during one of his speeches. He left active duty in the Marine Corps as of May 2008. Stann was also the commanding officer in the 8th Marine Regiment Headquarters Company while continuing to fight in the WEC.

U.S. Marine Corps officials have stated that they continue to use Stann's story as a recruiting tool. He attributes his success in mixed martial arts to the foundation he learned while training at the Marine Corps Martial Arts Center for Excellence in Quantico, Virginia and the explosiveness and powerlifting exercises he learned while playing football. "He has been an ideal spokesperson and role model" for the Marine Corps, said Lt. Col. Mike Zeliff, assistant chief of staff for advertising with Marine Corps Recruiting Command.

== Mixed martial arts career ==
Stann began his fighting career in 2006 while still serving on active duty, using accumulated leave to take time off for training and fights.

=== World Extreme Cagefighting ===
On March 26, 2008, Stann defeated Doug Marshall via KO to become the WEC Light Heavyweight champion. With this victory, Stann's MMA record reached 6–0, with five victories in the WEC.

In August 2008, Stann lost his title in his first defense, in a rematch against Steve Cantwell (a loss he avenged a year later).

=== Ultimate Fighting Championship ===
In 2008, Zuffa announced plans to merge the WEC's 185-lb and 205-lb weight classes with their UFC counterparts, allowing the WEC to concentrate on lighter weight classes (which eventually merged with the UFC as well).

Stann was scheduled to make his UFC debut on December 10, 2008, at the UFC: Fight For The Troops show, to be held at the Army base of Fort Bragg, North Carolina, but he was forced to withdraw from the card due to a foot injury sustained in training. Instead, he faced Krzysztof Soszynski at UFC 97 in Montreal, Quebec, Canada, on April 18, 2009. In the first round, Soszynski locked Stann in a kimura, forcing him to tap out for the first time in his career. Stann later stated in an issue of UFC Magazine that, because of previous military commitments, he was unable to adequately prepare himself for the "grappling-based" aspects of the fight, which contributed to his loss.

On September 16, 2009, at UFC Fight Night: Diaz vs. Guillard, Stann once again faced Steve Cantwell in a rubber match. Stann would go on to defeat Cantwell via unanimous decision (30–27, 30–27, 29–28). This would also be the first time he would fight to a decision in his professional career.

Stann defeated UFC newcomer Rodney Wallace on December 5, 2009, at The Ultimate Fighter 10 Finale by unanimous decision.

Stann then faced UFC newcomer Phil Davis on February 6, 2010, at UFC 109, losing via unanimous decision. Following the fight, Stann revealed he would drop to the 185 lbs. Middleweight division.

Stann then made his middleweight debut against Mike Massenzio on August 1, 2010, at UFC on Versus 2. Stann claimed his first ever submission victory, catching Massenzio in a triangle choke midway through the final round, in a bout that earned Fight of the Night honors.

Stann then fought in the co-main event of UFC 125 on New Years Day. He defeated Chris Leben with a first-round TKO stoppage. With this win, he became the second man to defeat Leben by way of strikes, the first being former UFC Middleweight Champion Anderson Silva.

Stann was scheduled to face former Pride Middleweight Champion Wanderlei Silva on May 28, 2011, at UFC 130. However, Silva voiced his reluctance to face Stann and was replaced by former Sengoku Middleweight Champion Jorge Santiago. Stann defeated Santiago via TKO in the 2nd round. A right to the temple sent Santiago to the mat, followed by numerous strikes by Stann which forced the stoppage.

Stann then fought Chael Sonnen on October 8, 2011, at UFC 136 where he was defeated via second round submission.

Stann faced Alessio Sakara on April 14, 2012, at UFC on Fuel TV: Gustafsson vs. Silva. After knocking down Sakara early with knees from the clinch, Stann utilized heavy ground-and-pound, delivering short elbows and hammerfists that eventually knocked Sakara out. Stann was awarded the victory at 2:26 of the first round. After Stann delivered the knockout blow, he sat up and motioned to the ref that Sakara was out, rather than delivering unnecessary (and potentially damaging) blows before the ref could jump in and stop the fight. Stann's actions were highly praised by both the media and fighters, with UFC Light Heavyweight Champion Jon Jones being quoted as saying that Brian Stann's actions were "good for the sport." UFC president Dana White also issued his praise for Stann's actions in the cage, calling him "one of the classiest people on Earth!".

Stann was expected to face Héctor Lombard on August 4, 2012, at UFC on Fox 4. However, Stann was forced out of the bout, citing a shoulder injury.

Stann next faced Michael Bisping on September 22, 2012, at UFC 152, losing by unanimous decision.

On March 3, 2013, at UFC on Fuel TV 8, the long-awaited fight between Stann and Wanderlei Silva happened, in a Light-Heavyweight division showdown. Stann lost the fight via KO in the second round, in a bout that featured back-and-forth action, earning both participants Fight of the Night honors.

On a special edition of Ariel Helwani's MMA Hour on July 11, 2013, Stann announced his retirement from mixed martial arts competition. Upon retiring, Stann became an analyst and commentator for Fox Sports and UFC. In August 2017, Stann announced that he would be leaving his job with Fox and UFC to become a real estate executive.

=== Professional Fighters League ===
In May 2018, ESPN reported that Stann accepted the advisory role as the head of Fighter and Competition/Rules Committee in the advisory board of Professional Fighters League (PFL), formally known as World Series of Fighting, where PFL would launch its inaugural season on July 7, 2018, airing on NBC Sports. Stann's main responsibility in the role would be influencing PFL on tournaments management, treatment and recruitment of the fighters. As per the report, Stann did not anticipate this new opportunity with PFL prior to leaving his commentary position with Fox Sports and the UFC.

== Personal life ==
Stann is married. He and his wife Michelle along with his three daughters and two step daughters reside in Milton, Georgia. For nine years, Stann was president and CEO of Hire Heroes USA, a nonprofit organization that helps U.S. military veterans. Until August 2021 he was the Chief Operating Officer at FirstKey Homes (a Cerberus Capital Management portfolio company) and is currently CEO of Hunt Military Communities.

== Championships and accomplishments ==
=== Mixed martial arts ===
- World Extreme Cagefighting
  - WEC Light Heavyweight Championship (One time)
- Ultimate Fighting Championship
  - Fight of the Night (Three times) vs. Mike Massenzio, Jorge Santiago and Wanderlei Silva
  - UFC.com Awards
    - 2009: Ranked #8 Upset of the Year vs. Steve Cantwell
    - 2011: Ranked #6 Upset of the Year vs. Chris Leben
    - 2013: Ranked #2 Fight of the Year vs. Wanderlei Silva
- MMAFighting.com
  - 2013 Best Fight of the Half-Year vs. Wanderlei Silva
- CombatPress.com
  - 2015 Broadcast Analyst of the Year

=== United States military ===
- Awards and decorations of the United States military
  - Silver Star

== Mixed martial arts record ==
Professional record breakdown
18 matches	12 wins	6 losses
By knockout	9	2
By submission	1	2
By decision	2	2

Res.	Record	Opponent	Method	Event	Date	Round	Time	Location	Notes
Loss	12–6	Wanderlei Silva	KO (punches)	UFC on Fuel TV: Silva vs. Stann	March 3, 2013	2	4:08	Saitama, Japan	Light Heavyweight bout. Fight of the Night.
Loss	12–5	Michael Bisping	Decision (unanimous)	UFC 152	September 22, 2012	3	5:00	Toronto, Ontario, Canada	
Win	12–4	Alessio Sakara	KO (punches)	UFC on Fuel TV: Gustafsson vs. Silva	April 14, 2012	1	2:26	Stockholm, Sweden	
Loss	11–4	Chael Sonnen	Submission (arm-triangle choke)	UFC 136	October 8, 2011	2	3:51	Houston, Texas, U.S.	
Win	11–3	Jorge Santiago	TKO (punches)	UFC 130	May 28, 2011	2	4:29	Las Vegas, Nevada, U.S.	Fight of the Night.
Win	10–3	Chris Leben	TKO (knee and punches)	UFC 125	January 1, 2011	1	3:37	Las Vegas, Nevada, U.S.	
Win	9–3	Mike Massenzio	Submission (triangle choke)	UFC Live: Jones vs. Matyushenko	August 1, 2010	3	3:10	San Diego, California, U.S.	Middleweight debut. Fight of the Night.
Loss	8–3	Phil Davis	Decision (unanimous)	UFC 109	February 6, 2010	3	5:00	Las Vegas, Nevada, U.S.	
Win	8–2	Rodney Wallace	Decision (unanimous)	The Ultimate Fighter: Heavyweights Finale	December 5, 2009	3	5:00	Las Vegas, Nevada, U.S.	
Win	7–2	Steve Cantwell	Decision (unanimous)	UFC Fight Night: Diaz vs. Guillard	September 16, 2009	3	5:00	Oklahoma City, Oklahoma, U.S.	
Loss	6–2	Krzysztof Soszynski	Submission (kimura)	UFC 97	April 18, 2009	1	3:53	Montreal, Quebec, Canada	
Loss	6–1	Steve Cantwell	TKO (punches)	WEC 35: Condit vs. Miura	August 3, 2008	2	4:01	Las Vegas, Nevada, U.S.	Lost the WEC Light Heavyweight Championship.
Win	6–0	Doug Marshall	TKO (punches)	WEC 33: Marshall vs. Stann	March 26, 2008	1	1:35	Las Vegas, Nevada, U.S.	Won the WEC Light Heavyweight Championship.
Win	5–0	Jeremiah Billington	TKO (punches)	WEC 30	September 5, 2007	1	3:07	Las Vegas, Nevada, U.S.	
Win	4–0	Craig Zellner	TKO (punches)	WEC 28	June 3, 2007	1	4:57	Las Vegas, Nevada, U.S.	
Win	3–0	Steve Cantwell	TKO (punches)	WEC 26: Condit vs. Alessio	March 24, 2007	1	0:41	Las Vegas, Nevada, U.S.	
Win	2–0	Miguel Cosio	TKO (punches)	WEC 21: Tapout	June 15, 2006	1	0:16	Highland, California, U.S.	
Win	1–0	Aaron Stark	TKO (punches)	SF 14: Resolution	January 6, 2006	1	3:14	Portland, Oregon, U.S.	

Awards and achievements
Preceded by Doug Marshall	6th WEC Light Heavyweight Champion; March 26, 2008 – August 3, 2008	Succeeded by Steve Cantwell
