= Gray Maynard =

American sport wrestler and mixed martial artist

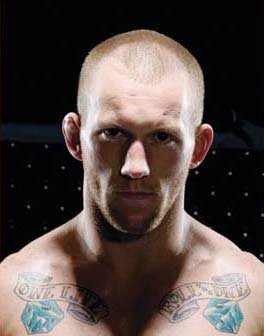
- Born: Bradley Gray Maynard; May 9, 1979 (age 47); Phoenix, Arizona, United States
- Other names: The Bully
- Height: 5 ft 8 in (173 cm)
- Weight: 145 lb (66 kg; 10 st 5 lb)
- Division: Featherweight; Lightweight
- Reach: 70 in (178 cm)
- Style: Wrestling
- Stance: Orthodox
- Fighting out of: Las Vegas, Nevada, United States
- Team: Xtreme Couture (2006–2011, 2014–present); American Kickboxing Academy (2011–2014); Nova União
- Rank: Black belt in Brazilian Jiu-Jitsu
- Wrestling: NCAA Division I Wrestling
- Years active: 2006–present (MMA)

Mixed martial arts record
- Total: 22
- Wins: 13
- By knockout: 2
- By decision: 11
- Losses: 7
- By knockout: 5
- By decision: 2
- Draws: 1
- No contests: 1

Amateur record
- Total: 1
- Wins: 1

Other information
- University: Michigan State University
- Notable schools: St. Edward High School; Durango High School; Bonanza High School
- Website: Official UFC Profile
- Mixed martial arts record from Sherdog

Bradley Gray Maynard (born May 9, 1979) is an American mixed martial artist who competed in the Lightweight and Featherweight division of the Ultimate Fighting Championship (UFC). Between 2008 and 2011, he competed in a noted rivalry with former UFC Lightweight Champion Frankie Edgar. Maynard competed in college wrestling at Michigan State University, and made his UFC debut in 2007.

== Background ==
Maynard's father, Jan, was a two-time Ohio high school state wrestling champion. He also has a sister named Misty. Maynard attended Bonanza High School and Durango High School in Las Vegas, Nevada, before he transferred to St. Edward High School in Lakewood, Ohio for two years. While at St. Ed's he wrestled for coach Greg Urbas, and excelled in its wrestling program.

In 1997, he placed second in the Ohio High School Athletic Association (OHSAA) state tournament in the 140 lb weight class for Division I. In 1998, he was the state champion at the 152 lb weight class. His high school record was an impressive 135–16, including being undefeated in his sophomore and senior years. His nickname of "Bully" came from his dog, Hank, a bull terrier he rescued. Maynard wrestled alongside former UFC light heavyweight champion Rashad Evans at Michigan State University. They were also roommates. He was redshirted in his freshman year. In 2001, he placed eighth at the NCAA Division I Collegiate Wrestling Championship at 157 lb weight class. In 2002 and 2003, he placed seventh. The performance earned the MSU co-captain All-American honors for the third time in his collegiate career.

Upon graduation, Maynard ranked 11th all-time in MSU history with 106 career wins and seventh with 26 falls. After not making the 2004 US Olympic wrestling team, Maynard considered retirement from the sport. He was then recruited to be a sparring partner for mixed martial arts fighter and former Lightweight UFC champion B.J. Penn. With his exposure to the new sport, Maynard sought to compete in it. With his wrestling connections, he eventually became a student and training partner of UFC Hall of Famer Randy Couture.

== Mixed martial arts career ==
=== The Ultimate Fighter ===
Maynard was a contestant on The Ultimate Fighter 5, which featured Lightweights exclusively. He was selected by B.J. Penn to be on his team and was Penn's pick to make it to the finals.

Maynard beat Wayne Weems in the preliminary round. In the quarterfinals, Maynard faced Brandon Melendez in a tough matchup and won the fight with a guillotine choke in the second round. He lost his semifinal matchup in the second round against Nate Diaz due to guillotine choke.

As part of The Ultimate Fighter 5 Finale preliminary Card on June 23, 2007, Maynard fought Rob Emerson in a controversial Lightweight fight. Maynard seemed to be in control of the fight in round one. During the second round he picked up Emerson and slammed him to the mat. Emerson immediately tapped out because of an injury to his ribs. The referee believed that Maynard also could not continue because he seemed to have hit his head on the mat and knocked himself out due to the force of his own slam. Since both fighters could not continue he ruled it a "No Contest". UFC President Dana White commented, "I know one thing, that Maynard was out cold". Maynard did not agree, and cited the cage-side doctors, who, after testing Maynard, found he had suffered no concussion during the bout. This fight earned him a $40,000 Fight of the Night award.

=== Ultimate Fighting Championship ===
In his next fight he took on Joe Veres at UFC Fight Night 11 and knocked him out with the first punch he threw, after nine seconds. It was the second fastest knockout in UFC history (at that time, see UFC 102). Next Maynard won a unanimous decision victory over Dennis Siver at UFC Fight Night 12 earning scores of (29–28, 30–27, and 29–28). At UFC Fight Night 13, he faced lightweight standout Frankie Edgar in the first bout of their rivalry. Maynard won a 30–27 unanimous decision on all cards to hand Edgar his first loss. He used his superior wrestling to control the fight, winning a decision. This fight earned him another Fight of the Night award.

Maynard also worked as an assistant wrestling coach for Forrest Griffin as part of The Ultimate Fighter: Team Rampage vs. Team Forrest.

Maynard earned a unanimous decision over Rich Clementi at UFC 90. In his fight, Maynard once again showed his superior wrestling as he controlled Clementi on the ground for 3 rounds. He did however appear notably disappointed during his post fight interview that he was unable to finish the fight.

Maynard then fought at UFC 96, against lightweight Jim Miller, winning by unanimous decision once again, with all three judges scoring the bout 30–27. Maynard kept the fight on the feet inversing his wrestling skills with excellent takedown defense and displayed solid standup skills, particularly looping bodyshot combos.

Maynard won against Roger Huerta via split decision at UFC Fight Night 19. During the fight, he had Huerta in a visibly deep kimura, though his opponent refused to submit.

Maynard defeated TUF 5 lightweight champion Nate Diaz via split decision at UFC Fight Night 20.

Maynard defeated Kenny Florian on August 28, 2010 at UFC 118 via unanimous decision (30–27, 30–27, and 29–28). Maynard took Florian down at will and controlled him on the mat, thus becoming the #1 contender for the UFC Lightweight Championship.

In a Fight of the Night winning contest, Maynard and the champion Frankie Edgar fought to a split draw on January 1, 2011 at UFC 125, resulting in Edgar retaining his belt. Early reports were that the former WEC champion Anthony Pettis would receive the next title shot, but Dana White later announced that instead Edgar vs Maynard 3 would be the next lightweight title fight at UFC 130. On May 9, it was announced that injuries to both forced the fight to be removed from the card. Many consider the second fight with Edgar as one of the greatest fights in UFC history.

The third bout between Edgar and Maynard took place on October 8, 2011 as the main event of UFC 136. Maynard was defeated by Edgar via KO at 3:54 of round 4, resulting in the first official loss of his career. After a first round similar to the first round in their bout at UFC 125, Edgar was able to close in on Maynard landing more shots and becoming the aggressor. He finished Maynard with a flurry of punches, starting with an uppercut that rocked Maynard.

On November 21, 2011 Maynard's Head boxing coach Gil Martinez told The MMA Show, that Maynard would be leaving Xtreme Couture gym for American Kickboxing Academy.

Maynard fought Clay Guida at UFC on FX 4. He won the bout via split decision.

Maynard was expected to face Joe Lauzon on December 29, 2012 at UFC 155. However, Maynard pulled out of the bout citing a knee injury and was replaced by Jim Miller.

Maynard next faced T. J. Grant at UFC 160 on May 25, 2013. Dana White announced at the UFC on Fox 7 post-fight press conference that he expects that the winner of the Maynard/Grant fight to get a UFC Lightweight title shot against Benson Henderson. Maynard lost the fight via TKO in the first round.

A rubber match with Nate Diaz took place on November 30, 2013 at The Ultimate Fighter 18 Finale. Maynard lost via TKO in the first round.

Maynard was expected to face Fabrício Camões on August 2, 2014 at UFC 176. However, after UFC 176 was cancelled, Maynard/Camões was rescheduled and expected to take place on August 16, 2014 at UFC Fight Night 47. In turn, Maynard stepped up as an injury replacement for Abel Trujillo after he pulled out of a bout with Ross Pearson. He lost the fight against Pearson by TKO in the second round.

After the loss to Pearson, signed a new, eight-fight contract and moved back to Las Vegas to train at Xtreme Couture.

Maynard faced Alexander Yakovlev on April 4, 2015 at UFC Fight Night 63. He lost the fight by unanimous decision.

Maynard faced Fernando Bruno in a featherweight bout on July 8, 2016 at The Ultimate Fighter 23 Finale. He won the bout via unanimous decision.

Maynard faced Ryan Hall on December 3, 2016 at The Ultimate Fighter 24 Finale. He lost the fight via unanimous decision.

Maynard faced Teruto Ishihara on July 7, 2017 at The Ultimate Fighter 25 Finale. He won the fight by unanimous decision.

Maynard returned to lightweight against Nik Lentz on October 6, 2018 at UFC 229. He lost the fight via TKO in the second round after being dropped by a head kick and finished with punches. A year later, Maynard revealed that he had parted ways with the UFC after a tenure which lasted over a decade, covering almost his whole professional mixed martial arts career.

== Personal life ==
Maynard and his longtime girlfriend are currently engaged. Maynard has a daughter, Estella (born 2013).

Gray Maynard co-starred in the movie, Art of Submission with Ving Rhames and Ernie Reyes, Jr.

Maynard also was an Assistant Coach alongside Forrest Griffin and Tyson Griffin with head coach Rich Franklin on the last episode of the 11th season of The Ultimate Fighter.

== Championships and accomplishments ==
=== Mixed martial arts ===
- Ultimate Fighting Championship
  - The Ultimate Fighter 5 Lightweight Tournament Semifinalist
  - Fight of the Night (Three times) vs. Rob Emerson, Dennis Siver and Frankie Edgar 2
    - Tied (Krzysztof Jotko & JJ Aldrich) for third highest decision-wins-per-win percentage in UFC history (90.9%) (10 decision wins / 11 wins)
  - UFC.com Awards
    - 2011: Ranked #2 Fight of the Year vs. Frankie Edgar 2, Half-Year Awards: Best Fight of the 1HY vs. Frankie Edgar 2 & Ranked #5 Fight of the Year vs. Frankie Edgar 3
- World MMA Awards
  - 2011 Fight of the Year vs. Frankie Edgar 2 at UFC 125
- Sherdog
  - Fight of the Year (2011) vs. Frankie Edgar 2 on January 1

=== Collegiate wrestling ===
- National Collegiate Athletic Association
  - NCAA Division I 157 lb - 8th place out of Michigan State University (2001)
  - NCAA Division I 157 lb - 7th place out of Michigan State University (2002)
  - NCAA Division I 157 lb - 7th place out of Michigan State University (2003)
  - NCAA Division I All-American (2001, 2002, 2003)

== Mixed martial arts record ==
Professional record breakdown
22 matches	13 wins	7 losses
By knockout	2	5
By decision	11	2
Draws	1	
No contests	1	

Res.	Record	Opponent	Method	Event	Date	Round	Time	Location	Notes
Loss	13–7–1 (1)	Nik Lentz	TKO (head kick and punches)	UFC 229	October 6, 2018	2	1:19	Las Vegas, Nevada, United States	Return to Lightweight.
Win	13–6–1 (1)	Teruto Ishihara	Decision (unanimous)	The Ultimate Fighter: Redemption Finale	July 7, 2017	3	5:00	Las Vegas, Nevada, United States	
Loss	12–6–1 (1)	Ryan Hall	Decision (unanimous)	The Ultimate Fighter: Tournament of Champions Finale	December 3, 2016	3	5:00	Las Vegas, Nevada, United States	
Win	12–5–1 (1)	Fernando Bruno	Decision (unanimous)	The Ultimate Fighter: Team Joanna vs. Team Cláudia Finale	July 8, 2016	3	5:00	Las Vegas, Nevada, United States	Featherweight debut.
Loss	11–5–1 (1)	Alexander Yakovlev	Decision (unanimous)	UFC Fight Night: Mendes vs. Lamas	April 4, 2015	3	5:00	Fairfax, Virginia, United States	
Loss	11–4–1 (1)	Ross Pearson	TKO (punches)	UFC Fight Night: Bader vs. St. Preux	August 16, 2014	2	1:35	Bangor, Maine, United States	
Loss	11–3–1 (1)	Nate Diaz	TKO (punches)	The Ultimate Fighter: Team Rousey vs. Team Tate Finale	November 30, 2013	1	2:38	Las Vegas, Nevada, United States	
Loss	11–2–1 (1)	TJ Grant	TKO (punches)	UFC 160	May 25, 2013	1	2:07	Las Vegas, Nevada, United States	UFC Lightweight title eliminator.
Win	11–1–1 (1)	Clay Guida	Decision (split)	UFC on FX: Maynard vs. Guida	June 22, 2012	5	5:00	Atlantic City, New Jersey, United States	
Loss	10–1–1 (1)	Frankie Edgar	KO (punches)	UFC 136	October 8, 2011	4	3:54	Houston, Texas, United States	For the UFC Lightweight Championship.
Draw	10–0–1 (1)	Frankie Edgar	Draw (split)	UFC 125	January 1, 2011	5	5:00	Las Vegas, Nevada, United States	For the UFC Lightweight Championship. Fight of the Night.
Win	10–0 (1)	Kenny Florian	Decision (unanimous)	UFC 118	August 28, 2010	3	5:00	Boston, Massachusetts, United States	UFC Lightweight title eliminator.
Win	9–0 (1)	Nate Diaz	Decision (split)	UFC Fight Night: Maynard vs. Diaz	January 11, 2010	3	5:00	Fairfax, Virginia, United States	
Win	8–0 (1)	Roger Huerta	Decision (split)	UFC Fight Night: Diaz vs. Guillard	September 16, 2009	3	5:00	Oklahoma City, Oklahoma, United States	
Win	7–0 (1)	Jim Miller	Decision (unanimous)	UFC 96	March 7, 2009	3	5:00	Columbus, Ohio, United States	
Win	6–0 (1)	Rich Clementi	Decision (unanimous)	UFC 90	October 25, 2008	3	5:00	Rosemont, Illinois, United States	
Win	5–0 (1)	Frankie Edgar	Decision (unanimous)	UFC Fight Night: Florian vs. Lauzon	April 2, 2008	3	5:00	Broomfield, Colorado, United States	
Win	4–0 (1)	Dennis Siver	Decision (unanimous)	UFC Fight Night: Swick vs. Burkman	January 23, 2008	3	5:00	Las Vegas, Nevada, United States	Fight of the Night.
Win	3–0 (1)	Joe Veres	KO (punch)	UFC Fight Night: Thomas vs. Florian	September 19, 2007	1	0:09	Las Vegas, Nevada, United States	
NC	2–0 (1)	Rob Emerson	NC (double TKO)	The Ultimate Fighter 5 Finale	June 23, 2007	2	0:39	Las Vegas, Nevada, United States	Fight of the Night.
Win	2–0	Brent Weedman	Decision (unanimous)	WEF: Orleans Arena	June 10, 2006	3	5:00	Las Vegas, Nevada, United States	
Win	1–0	Joshua Powell	TKO (punches)	Title Fighting Championships 1	April 21, 2006	1	2:56	Des Moines, Iowa, United States	

=== The Ultimate Fighter 5 ===
Professional record breakdown
3 matches	2 wins	1 loss
By knockout	1	0
By submission	1	1
By decision	0	0

Res.	Record	Opponent	Method	Event	Date	Round	Time	Location	Notes
Loss	2–1	Nate Diaz	Submission (guillotine choke)	The Ultimate Fighter 5		2	1:17	Las Vegas, Nevada, United States	Semi-finals
Win	2–0	Brandon Melendez	Submission (guillotine choke)	The Ultimate Fighter 5		2	4:07	Las Vegas, Nevada, United States	Quarter-finals
Win	1–0	Wayne Weems	TKO (punches)	The Ultimate Fighter 5	January 2007	1	2:47	Las Vegas, Nevada, United States	Preliminary bout

=== Amateur mixed martial arts record ===
Professional record breakdown
1 match	1 win	0 losses
By knockout	0	0
By submission	0	0
By decision	1	0

Res.	Record	Opponent	Method	Event	Date	Round	Time	Location	Notes
Win	1–0	Evan Dunham	Decision (Unanimous)	SF (SportFight) 15	8 April 2006	3	3:00	Oregon, United States	

== Pay-per-view bouts ==
No.	Fight	Event	City	Venue	PPV Buys
1.	Edgar vs. Maynard 2	UFC 125	Las Vegas, Nevada	MGM Grand Garden Arena	270,000
2.	Maynard vs. Edgar lll	UFC 136	Houston, Texas	Toyota Center	225,000

== See also ==
- List of current UFC fighters
- List of male mixed martial artists
