= Lightweight (MMA) =

MMA weight class

The lightweight division in mixed martial arts contains different weight classes:

- The UFC's lightweight division, which groups competitors within 146 to 155 lb (66 to 70 kg)
- The Shooto lightweight division, which limits competitors to 145 lb (65.8 kg)
- The ONE Championship's lightweight division, with an upper limit at 77.1 kg (170.0 lb)
- The Road FC's lightweight division, with an upper limit at 154 lb (70 kg)

== Ambiguity and clarification ==
For the sake of uniformity, most American mixed martial arts media outlets consider Lightweight competitors to be between 146 and 155 lb (66 and 70 kg). This encompasses The Shooto Welterweight division (154 lb / 70 kg).

The UFC's lightweight division was reinstated at UFC 58 after falling into disuse following UFC 49. Sean Sherk, a former welterweight contender, defeated Kenny Florian at UFC 64, becoming the first UFC lightweight champion since 2002.

The lightweight limit, as defined by the Nevada State Athletic Commission and the Association of Boxing Commissions is 155 lb (70 kg).

== Professional champions ==
=== Current champions ===
These tables were last updated in February of 2026.

Active title reign
Active title reign (interim)

Men:

Organization	Reign Began	Champion	Record	Defenses
UFC	June 14, 2026	(United States) Justin Gaethje	28-5-0 (21KO 1SUB)	0
ACA	September 19, 2020	(Russia) Abdul-Aziz Abdulvakhabov	22-2-0 (9KO 6SUB)	4
Brave CF	June 23, 2023	(Kyrgyzstan) Abdisalam Kubanychbek Uulu	23-3-0 (1) (12KO 3SUB)	3
Brave CF	October 3, 2025	(Georgia (country)) Raul Tutarauli	37-8-0 (22KO 5SUB)	0
CFFC	February 6, 2026	(United States) Solomon Simon	13-2-0 (3KO 3SUB)	0
Cage Warriors	March 21, 2025	(Brazil) Samuel Silva	13-5-1 (4KO 3SUB)	0
Cage Warriors	November 22, 2025	(Jamaica) Omiel Brown	12-3-0 (6KO 4SUB)	0
DEEP	September 16, 2024	(Japan) Shunta Nomura	10-2-0 (4KO 0SUB)	0
DEEP	November 22, 2025	(Japan) Juri Ohara	37-22-2 (20KO 2SUB)	0
Eagle FC	November 11, 2023	(Azerbaijan) Ramin Sultanov	9-1-0 (4KO 3SUB)	0
FEN	November 23, 2024	(Poland) Damian Rzepecki	9-0-0 (4KO 5SUB)	1
Ice Cage	March 23, 2025	(Finland) Makwan Amirkhani	20-11-0 (1KO 14SUB)	0
Jungle Fight	August 26, 2023	(Brazil) Arcangelo Oliveira	14-5-0 (3KO 6SUB)	2
KSW	June 3, 2023	(France) Salahdine Parnasse	22-2-0 (7KO 7SUB)	3
LFA	April 21, 2025	(United States) Richie Miranda	12-1-0 (5KO 2SUB)	1
LFA	November 3, 2023	(Brazil) Jefferson Nascimento	12-0-0 (4K0 3SUB)	1
LUX Fight League	November 1, 2024	(Mexico) Kazula Vargas	16-6-0 (7KO 7SUB)	0
Oktagon MMA	January 31, 2026	(Poland) Mateusz Legierski	13-2-0 (4KO 3SUB)	0
ONE Championship	November 6, 2026	(United States) Tye Ruotolo	3-0-0 (0KO 3SUB)	0
Pancrase	March 31, 2024	(Japan) Tatsuya Saika	14-6-0 (13KO 0SUB)	0
PFL	October 3, 2025	(Russia) Usman Nurmagomedov	22-0-0 (1) (9KO 7SUB)	2
RIZIN FF	May 10, 2026	(Brazil) Luiz Gustavo	16-4-0 (9KO 5SUB)	0
Shooto	N/A	Vacant (Note: The companies’ champions that are listed as “vacant” have won the company’s title for their division, but either is signed to another company (eg; Vacant), or has competed in the same promotion since then, but has no hold to a title defense, therefore indicating a non-title bout.)	N/A	N/A

Women:

Organization	Reign Began	Champion	Record	Defenses
Jewels	N/A	Vacant	N/A	N/A

== Most wins in lightweight title bouts ==
Note: the list includes wins in bouts for lightweight titles of major promotions (UFC, ONE, Strikeforce, WEC, Bellator)
Note: the list includes both undisputed and interim champions
Active title reign

	Name	Promotion	Title bout wins
1.	(United States) Gilbert Melendez	WEC, Strikeforce	10 (1 WEC, 9 Strikeforce)
2.	(United States) Benson Henderson	WEC, UFC	7 (3 WEC, 4 UFC)
3.	(Russia) Islam Makhachev	UFC	5
3.	(United States) Michael Chandler	Bellator	5
4.	(United States) B.J. Penn	UFC	4
4.	(Russia) Khabib Nurmagomedov	UFC	4
4.	(Russia) Usman Nurmagomedov	Bellator	
4.	(United States) Eddie Alvarez	Bellator, UFC	4 (3 Bellator, 1 UFC)
5.	(United States) Jens Pulver	UFC	3
5.	(Philippines) Eduard Folayang	ONE	3
5.	(United States) Gabe Ruediger	WEC	3
5.	(Brazil) Hermes Franca	WEC	3
5.	(United States) Jamie Varner	WEC	3
5.	(United States) Frankie Edgar	UFC	3 (+1) (Note: Edgar's title defense against Gray Maynard at UFC 125 was a split draw. Edgar retained the Lightweight title. The two later rematched at UFC 136, with Edgar defeating Maynard via KO and defending his title.)
5.	(United States) Anthony Pettis	WEC, UFC	3 (1 WEC, 2 UFC)
6.	(United States) Sean Sherk	UFC	2
6.	(United States) Rob McCullough	WEC	2
6.	(Brazil) Rafael dos Anjos	UFC	2
6.	(Brazil) Charles Oliveira	UFC	2

== Most consecutive defenses of lightweight title ==
	Name	Promotion	Consecutive title defenses
1.	(Russia) Islam Makhachev	UFC	4
2.	(United States) Gilbert Melendez	Strikeforce	4
3.	(United States) B.J. Penn	UFC	3
4.	(United States) Frankie Edgar	UFC	3
5.	(United States) Benson Henderson	UFC	3
6.	(Russia) Khabib Nurmagomedov	UFC	3

== See also ==
- List of current MMA Lightweight champions
- List of UFC Lightweight Champions
- List of Strikeforce Lightweight Champions
- List of Pancrase Lightweight Champions
- List of Road FC Lightweight Champions
