= Kenny Florian =

American mixed martial artist and combat sport color commentator

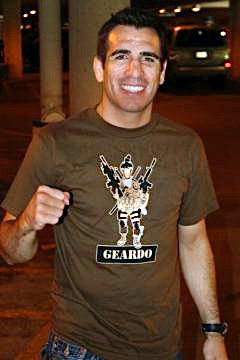
- Born: Kenneth Alan Florian; May 26, 1976 (age 50); Westwood, Massachusetts, U.S.
- Other names: KenFlo
- Height: 5 ft 10 in (1.78 m)
- Weight: 145 lb (66 kg; 10 st 5 lb)
- Division: Middleweight (2005); Welterweight (2003–2005); Lightweight (2006–2010); Featherweight (2011–2012)
- Reach: 74 in (188 cm)
- Style: Brazilian jiu-jitsu
- Stance: Southpaw
- Fighting out of: Brookline, Massachusetts, U.S.
- Team: Florian Martial Arts Center; Tristar Gym
- Trainer: Keith Florian
- Rank: 5th degree black belt in Brazilian jiu-jitsu under Roberto Maia
- Years active: 2003–2012 (MMA)

Mixed martial arts record
- Total: 20
- Wins: 14
- By knockout: 4
- By submission: 8
- By decision: 2
- Losses: 6
- By knockout: 1
- By submission: 1
- By decision: 4

Other information
- University: Boston College
- Notable school: Dover-Sherborn High School
- Website: Official UFC Profile http://www.kennyflorian.com/
- Mixed martial arts record from Sherdog

Kenneth Alan "Kenny" Florian (born May 26, 1976) is an American retired mixed martial artist and commentator who formerly competed in the Ultimate Fighting Championship (UFC). He formerly served as an analyst for UFC on Fox from 2011 to 2018, provided color commentary for UFC Fight Night, and provides color commentary on the robot combat television series BattleBots. He is currently signed to the Professional Fighters League (PFL) as a commentator.

Florian has a background in Brazilian jiu-jitsu and Muay Thai. He is known for his cerebral approach to the sport based on his meticulous game plans. Florian is recognized for his tendency to finish his opponents, having earned stoppages in twelve of his fourteen career victories. He is also one of only two fighters in history to compete in four different weight classes in the UFC: Middleweight, Welterweight, Lightweight and Featherweight, the other being Diego Sanchez.

Florian defeated Chris Leben on the inaugural season of The Ultimate Fighter reality show, but succumbed in the finale against Diego Sanchez. He has competed on two occasions for the UFC Lightweight Championship and once for the UFC Featherweight Championship, but came up short against Sean Sherk, B.J. Penn, and José Aldo respectively. Recognized as one of the elite competitors during his tenures in the Ultimate Fighting Championship, Florian is considered one of the best mixed martial artists never to have won a UFC Championship.

== Early life ==
Florian is one of six children born to Peruvian parents: Agustin, a thoracic surgeon, and Ines Florian; however, none of his grandparents are from Peru, his ancestry includes: Spanish, Italian, German, French and Armenian. Florian was born in Westwood, Massachusetts, and grew up in neighboring Dover, Massachusetts, where he was a standout soccer player for Dover-Sherborn Regional High School. He attended Boston College where he played for the varsity soccer team (NCAA Division 1). He also holds dual citizenship in the United States and Peru.

After college, his interests turned towards mixed martial arts and he earned a black belt in Brazilian jiu-jitsu from Roberto Maia. Florian worked as a translator, reworking financial documents into various foreign languages and planned on doing that for a few years before applying to law school. However, a near-death experience in Brazil inspired him to pursue his passion for mixed martial arts instead.

== Mixed martial arts career ==
Kenny is known for his elbow strikes, which Joe Rogan describes as "razor sharp".

Florian made his MMA debut in January 2003 at Mass Destruction 10, defeating Jason Giroux via TKO 3:23 into the first round. Florian made another appearance in the Mass Destruction Promotion at MD – 15 and scored a victory over Bobby McAndrews by submission (kimura). Following those victories, Kenny suffered his first loss to UFC regular Drew Fickett via decision at Combat Zone 7 – Gravel Pit on July 10, 2004. This is the fight that got Kenny on the Ultimate Fighter as Dana White was at the show scouting Fickett for the show but he was so impressed with Kenny that he offered him, not Fickett, the spot on the show.

=== The Ultimate Fighter ===
Kenny went on to compete on the first season of The Ultimate Fighter as a middleweight. He made it to the finals by beating Chris Leben via cut stoppage, before losing at the finale in the first round to Diego Sanchez due to strikes.

=== Ultimate Fighting Championship ===
Following his loss to Sanchez, Florian returned at the first UFC Ultimate Fight Night to defeat fellow TUF 1 competitor Alex Karalexis by delivering a vicious cut across the nose with a right elbow. Karalexis was arguably winning the fight up until the cut. Florian famously danced and cheered immediately after the strike landed and the cut opened up. Picking up momentum, Kenny went on to face Muay Thai competitor Kit Cope, winning with a rear naked choke submission early in round 2. Florian earned a title shot after defeating Canadian TKO Major League MMA Lightweight champion Sam Stout at The Ultimate Fighter 3 Finale; Florian won in the first round by rear naked choke. This fight earned him a Submission of the Night award.

On October 14, 2006, Florian fought Sean Sherk for the UFC Lightweight championship title at UFC 64: Unstoppable and lost via unanimous decision. Sherk completely dominated the fight despite being cut severely by one of Florian's elbows. The judges scored it 50–45 and 49–46 twice for Sherk. In doing so, Sherk became the new UFC lightweight champion. This fight earned him a Fight of the Night award.

On April 5, 2007, at UFC Fight Night 9, Florian defeated Japanese fighter Dokonjonosuke Mishima via rear naked choke submission. Florian managed to break free of an excruciating knee-bar attempt made by Mishima late in the fight. This fight earned him another Fight of the Night award.

On July 7, 2007, at UFC 73, he fought and defeated UFC newcomer Alvin Robinson via submission due to strikes in the first round. Florian tripped Robinson to the mat before moving to side-control. Florian then transitioned into mount before pounding away until Robinson tapped due to strikes.

In his next fight, Florian managed to get another win via submission due to a rear naked choke against Din Thomas at UFC Fight Night 11. Thomas injured his knee while attempting a takedown during the bout. Thomas was originally slated to face off against Spencer Fisher, but Fisher had to pull out due to a staph infection. Florian took his place.

On April 2, 2008, Florian defeated Joe Lauzon at UFC Fight Night 13 by TKO due to strikes from mount early in the second round to secure his spot among the UFC's top lightweight contenders. The first round went back and forth as Kenny landed a vicious body kick and Lauzon looked for knee bars and heel hooks. Florian finished the round with some hard shots to Joe's head. Florian opened the 2nd round with a takedown and rained down punches on Lauzon from the mount position. Lauzon attempted another heel hook but Florian continued to strike which resulted in Herb Dean stopping the fight. This fight earned him a $20,000 Fight of the Night award.

At UFC 87 on August 9, 2008, Florian defeated Roger Huerta by unanimous decision. By winning, Florian ended Huerta's 17-fight win streak. All three judges scored the bout 30–27 for Florian.

At UFC 91 on November 15, 2008, Florian defeated Joe Stevenson by rear naked choke submission in the first round. Florian executed a takedown before mounting Stevenson and transitioning to a position to finish him with the choke.

=== Second title opportunity ===
With the win Florian established himself as the #1 contender for the Lightweight Championship. Florian said "I want B.J.'s belt. B.J., you're one of the best fighters out there. I'm here to test myself. I think you're a great fighter, someone I look up to. I consider you a master. It's time to kill that master." Florian faced off against Penn at the UFC 101 Main Event for the title. During the fight, Florian repeatedly pushed Penn against the fence and attempted to take him down but was never successful. During the 4th round Penn took him down and mounted him. Penn eventually took his back and locked up a rear naked choke, submitting Florian and defending his title. Florian was visibly crying as he left the octagon after his loss to Penn.

Florian fought Clay Guida on December 12, 2009, at UFC 107. During the second round, Florian caught Guida with a right hand on the chin that dropped Guida. He followed up with a short flurry and finished the fight via rear naked choke at 2:19.

He has expressed interest in getting a rematch with Diego Sanchez. On an episode of MMA Live (before the Penn loss) he said that his loss to Sanchez is the one he would most like to avenge. Sanchez has expressed similar interest as have many fans, though this looks to be unlikely as Sanchez has moved back to the Welterweight division.

Florian defeated former Pride Lightweight Champion Takanori Gomi at UFC Fight Night 21 via rear naked choke in the third round. He won the first two rounds decisively with superior striking, utilizing multiple jabs. Florian eventually took Gomi down in the third round and submitted him shortly after. This fight earned him another Submission of the Night award.

Florian suffered a staph infection in his knee just weeks after his win over Gomi and was admitted to hospital for minor surgery.

Florian faced Gray Maynard on August 28, 2010, at UFC 118. Dana White announced the winner of the fight would receive a shot at the UFC Lightweight Championship. Although striking very well throughout the fight, he was taken down at will and lost via unanimous decision.

Florian was expected to face Evan Dunham at UFC 126, but the bout was then expected to headline UFC Fight Night 23 on January 22, 2011. However, Florian had to pull out of the bout due to knee injury on December 6, 2010. Melvin Guillard defeated Dunham as Kenny's replacement.

=== Featherweight-Third Title Opportunity ===
On February 7, 2011, it was announced that Florian would be moving down to featherweight. He made his Featherweight debut with a unanimous decision victory over Diego Nunes on June 11, 2011, at UFC 131, with the judges' scorecards being (29–28, 29–28, and 30–27). Dana White said on MMA Live if Kenny wins this fight he'll most likely get a title shot. Florian was given the title shot against José Aldo for the UFC Featherweight Championship on October 8, 2011, at UFC 136 and was defeated by unanimous decision.

=== Retirement ===
Following his loss to Aldo, his third loss in a championship fight, Florian initially contemplated retirement from active competition. But in an interview with The Boston Herald, he stated that he still loved the sport tremendously, learning and competing. Kenny then went on to say that he would be making a return to the UFC's lightweight division, but would not fight for at least 6 months so that he can rebuild his body to compete in the higher weight class.

Florian has dealt with back problems throughout his career, but suffered a new injury in November 2011 while lifting weights. Having already planned to take six months off to build back to lightweight after losing a featherweight title shot in October 2011, Florian didn't expect the injury to be a major setback.

After the Aldo bout, Florian had been dealing with tingling and numbness down his right leg and hadn't been able to train. After meeting with an orthopedic doctor and a neurologist, both advised the 35-year-old to retire. On May 31, 2012, Florian announced his retirement during Ultimate Fighter: Live Finale weigh-ins show.

== Color commentary career ==
Florian co-hosted MMA Live, alongside Franklin McNeil and others, for ESPN.com which is shown online and on TV on ESPN. Florian contributed to the show with his MMA experience and perspective as a fighter. Florian now co-hosts "UFC Tonight" on FS1 with Michael Bisping, providing similar analysis and perspectives as he did on MMA Live. Florian was a guest writer for FIGHT!, an MMA magazine, in their April 2009 issue.

On April 19, 2008, Florian filled in for Joe Rogan as the color commentator for UFC 83 and again at UFC Fight Night 19. On June 7, 2009, Kenny Florian would fill in for Frank Mir, whose wife gave birth two days later, as color commentator for WEC 41. Florian also provided color commentary for WEC 49 and the TUF 11 Finale. Florian also took Joe Rogan's place as commentator for UFC 134.

Kenny Florian was briefly suspended by Fox Sports on January 16, 2016, for plagiarism in his preview of UFC Fight Night: Dillashaw vs. Cruz. The offending article lifted significant portions from boxing analyst Lee Wylie's breakdown of Willie Pep.

In 2015, Florian was named as the color commentator for ABC's revival of the robot combat series BattleBots, joined by Fox Sports personality Chris Rose on play-by-play. Florian continued his role on the revival's third season, which moved to Science Channel.

In March 2021, Florian revealed that he had signed an exclusive deal with the Professional Fighters League as a commentator.

== Personal life ==
On Dr Phil, Florian, along with UFC President Dana White and former Light Heavyweight Champion Forrest Griffin, talked to two high school students who participated in classroom "MMA" fights, telling them of the dangers of fighting outside of a sanctioned organization and telling them they should be training in an MMA gym instead. Dr. Phil addressed him as "Kenny Florini".

On June 10, 2010, Keith and Kenny received their second degree on their black belt from Roberto Maia. Kenny and his brother Keith own and operate Florian Martial Arts Center, a martial arts academy in Brookline, Massachusetts near Coolidge Corner, which teaches Brazilian jiu-jitsu, Muay Thai, wrestling and mixed martial arts. Instructors at the academy include Kenny Florian, Keith Florian, and Alex Lewis.

In a GQ interview, actor Jonah Hill credits Florian as helping him get comfortable enough to train jiu-jitsu.

Florian is fluent in Spanish.

== Championships and awards ==
=== Mixed martial arts ===
- Ultimate Fighting Championship
  - The Ultimate Fighter 1 Middleweight Tournament Runner-up
  - Fight of the Night (Three times) vs. Sean Sherk, Dokonjonosuke Mishima and Joe Lauzon
  - Submission of the Night (Two times) vs. Sam Stout and Takanori Gomi
  - Tied (Renato Moicano & Brendan Allen) for third most rear-naked submissions in UFC history (7)
  - UFC Encyclopedia Awards
    - Submission of the Night (One time) vs. Kit Cope
  - UFC.com Awards
    - 2005: Ranked #5 Submission of the Year vs. Kit Cope
    - 2006: Ranked #3 Submission of the Year vs. Sam Stout
    - 2007: Ranked #10 Fighter of the Year (Tied with Marcus Davis)
    - 2008: Ranked #3 Fighter of the Year & Ranked #4 Submission of the Year vs. Joe Stevenson

=== Brazilian jiu-jitsu ===
- Pan-American Championship
  - Pan-American Jiu-Jitsu Championships 2003 Brown Middle - 3rd Place
- North American Grappling Association
  - NAGA BJJ Superfight Champion
  - NAGA Advanced Gi Open Champion
  - NAGA Advanced Gi Middleweight Champion
  - NAGA North Eastern Grappling Championships – Pro Lightweight – 3rd Place
- ADCC World Championship
  - 2002 Abu Dhabi US Trials
- Grapplers Quest
  - Grapplers Quest Hall of Fame
  - Grapplers Quest Superfight Champion
  - Grapplers Quest Worlds Superfight Absolute Professional – 3rd place
  - Grapplers Quest US Nationals Expert Middleweight – 3rd place
- Copa Atlantica
  - 2002 Copa Atlantica - Brown Belt Champion

== Mixed martial arts record ==
Professional record breakdown
20 matches	14 wins	6 losses
By knockout	4	1
By submission	8	1
By decision	2	4

Res.	Record	Opponent	Method	Event	Date	Round	Time	Location	Notes
Loss	14–6	José Aldo	Decision (unanimous)	UFC 136	October 8, 2011	5	5:00	Houston, Texas, United States	For the UFC Featherweight Championship.
Win	14–5	Diego Nunes	Decision (unanimous)	UFC 131	June 11, 2011	3	5:00	Vancouver, British Columbia, Canada	Featherweight debut.
Loss	13–5	Gray Maynard	Decision (unanimous)	UFC 118	August 28, 2010	3	5:00	Boston, Massachusetts, United States	UFC Lightweight title eliminator.
Win	13–4	Takanori Gomi	Submission (rear-naked choke)	UFC Fight Night: Florian vs. Gomi	March 31, 2010	3	2:52	Charlotte, North Carolina, United States	Submission of the Night.
Win	12–4	Clay Guida	Submission (rear-naked choke)	UFC 107	December 12, 2009	2	2:19	Memphis, Tennessee, United States	
Loss	11–4	B.J. Penn	Submission (rear-naked choke)	UFC 101	August 8, 2009	4	3:54	Philadelphia, Pennsylvania, United States	For the UFC Lightweight Championship.
Win	11–3	Joe Stevenson	Submission (rear-naked choke)	UFC 91	November 15, 2008	1	4:03	Las Vegas, Nevada, United States	
Win	10–3	Roger Huerta	Decision (unanimous)	UFC 87	August 9, 2008	3	5:00	Minneapolis, Minnesota, United States	
Win	9–3	Joe Lauzon	TKO (punches and elbows)	UFC Fight Night: Florian vs. Lauzon	April 2, 2008	2	3:28	Broomfield, Colorado, United States	Fight of the Night.
Win	8–3	Din Thomas	Submission (rear-naked choke)	UFC Fight Night: Thomas vs. Florian	September 19, 2007	1	4:31	Las Vegas, Nevada, United States	
Win	7–3	Alvin Robinson	TKO (submission to punches)	UFC 73	July 7, 2007	1	4:30	Sacramento, California, United States	
Win	6–3	Dokonjonosuke Mishima	Submission (rear-naked choke)	UFC Fight Night: Stevenson vs. Guillard	April 5, 2007	3	3:57	Las Vegas, Nevada, United States	Fight of the Night.
Loss	5–3	Sean Sherk	Decision (unanimous)	UFC 64	October 14, 2006	5	5:00	Las Vegas, Nevada, United States	For the vacant UFC Lightweight Championship. Fight of the Night.
Win	5–2	Sam Stout	Submission (rear-naked choke)	The Ultimate Fighter 3 Finale	June 24, 2006	1	1:46	Las Vegas, Nevada, United States	Lightweight debut. Submission of the Night.
Win	4–2	Kit Cope	Submission (rear-naked choke)	The Ultimate Fighter 2 Finale	November 5, 2005	2	0:37	Las Vegas, Nevada, United States	
Win	3–2	Alex Karalexis	TKO (doctor stoppage)	UFC Ultimate Fight Night	August 6, 2005	2	2:52	Las Vegas, Nevada, United States	Return to Welterweight.
Loss	2–2	Diego Sanchez	TKO (punches)	The Ultimate Fighter 1 Finale	April 9, 2005	1	2:49	Las Vegas, Nevada, United States	Middleweight debut. The Ultimate Fighter Season 1 Middleweight Tournament Final.
Loss	2–1	Drew Fickett	Decision (split)	Combat Zone 7: Gravel Pit	July 10, 2004	3	5:00	Revere, Massachusetts, United States	
Win	2–0	Bobby McAndrews	Submission (kimura)	Mass Destruction 15	February 21, 2004	1	1:57	Boston, Massachusetts, United States	
Win	1–0	Jason Giroux	KO (punch)	Mass Destruction 10	January 25, 2003	1	3:23	Taunton, Massachusetts, United States	
