= UFC Fight Night: Florian vs. Lauzon =

UFC mixed martial arts event in 2008

- The poster for UFC Fight Night: Florian vs. Lauzon
- Promotion: Ultimate Fighting Championship
- Date: April 2, 2008
- Venue: Broomfield Event Center
- City: Broomfield, Colorado
- Attendance: 6,742
- Total gate: $753,429

Event chronology
UFC 82: Pride of a Champion	UFC Fight Night: Florian vs. Lauzon	UFC 83: Serra vs. St-Pierre 2

UFC Fight Night: Florian vs. Lauzon (also known as UFC Fight Night 13) was a mixed martial arts (MMA) event held by the Ultimate Fighting Championship (UFC) on April 2, 2008, at the Broomfield Event Center in Broomfield, Colorado, United States.

== Background ==
The event was a lead-in to the premiere of The Ultimate Fighter 7 on Spike. Instead of scheduling a two-hour program usually set for UFC Fight Night cards, the event was a three-hour broadcast, a change due to a petition from Sherdog Forums and a letter-writing campaign by MMA fans to Spike.

Fight Night 13 was the first UFC event to be held in Colorado since The Ultimate Ultimate was held in Denver on December 16, 1995.

Stephan Bonnar was originally slated to take on Matt Hamill, but was forced to withdraw when he suffered a complete tear of his left collateral knee ligament during training. He was replaced by Tim Boetsch, who took the fight on only ten days notice.

A planned bout between lightweights Spencer Fisher and Marcus Aurélio was cancelled due to a shoulder injury Fisher suffered during training. On March 20, 2008, the UFC website announced that newcomer Ryan Roberts was to make his octagon debut on short notice to face Marcus Aurélio as a replacement for the injured Spencer Fisher.

This event also marked the first bout of a series of fights between Frankie Edgar and Gray Maynard.

== Results ==
Main card
Weight class				Method	Round	Time	Notes
Lightweight	Kenny Florian	def.	Joe Lauzon	TKO (punches)	2	3:28
Lightweight	Gray Maynard	def.	Frankie Edgar	Decision (unanimous) (30–27, 30–27, 30–27)	3	5:00
Welterweight	Thiago Alves	def.	Karo Parisyan	TKO (punches)	2	0:34
Light Heavyweight	Matt Hamill	def.	Tim Boetsch	TKO (punches)	2	1:25
Lightweight	Nate Diaz	def.	Kurt Pellegrino	Submission (triangle choke)	2	3:06
Light Heavyweight	James Irvin	def.	Houston Alexander	KO (superman punch)	1	0:08
Preliminary card
Lightweight	Josh Neer	def.	Din Thomas	Decision (unanimous) (30–27, 30–27, 30–27)	3	5:00
Lightweight	Marcus Aurelio	def.	Ryan Roberts	Submission (armbar)	1	0:16
Lightweight	Manvel Gamburyan	def.	Jeff Cox	Submission (guillotine choke)	1	1:41
Lightweight	Clay Guida	def.	Samy Schiavo	TKO (punches)	1	4:15
Welterweight	George Sotiropoulos	def.	Roman Mitichyan	TKO (punches)	2	2:24
Welterweight	Anthony Johnson	def.	Tom Speer	KO (punch)	1	0:51	(Note: This preliminary bout aired on the broadcast following the Alves vs Parisyan bout.)

== Bonus awards ==
The following fighters received $20,000 bonuses.

- Fight of the Night: Kenny Florian vs. Joe Lauzon
- Knockout of the Night: James Irvin
- Submission of the Night: Nate Diaz

== See also ==
- Ultimate Fighting Championship
- List of UFC champions
- List of UFC events
- 2008 in UFC
