= UFC 125 =

UFC mixed martial arts event in 2011

UFC 125: Resolution
- The poster for UFC 125: Resolution
- Promotion: Ultimate Fighting Championship
- Date: January 1, 2011
- Venue: MGM Grand Garden Arena
- City: Las Vegas, Nevada
- Attendance: 12,874
- Total gate: $2,174,780
- Buyrate: 270,000

Event chronology
UFC 124: St-Pierre vs. Koscheck 2	UFC 125: Resolution	UFC: Fight for the Troops 2

UFC 125: Resolution was a mixed martial arts event held by the Ultimate Fighting Championship on January 1, 2011, at the MGM Grand Garden Arena in Las Vegas, Nevada.

== Background ==
The planned rematch between UFC Middleweight Champion Anderson Silva and Chael Sonnen from their UFC 117 bout was at one point thought to take place at this event.

On October 26, 2010, Shane Carwin had to pull out of his fight with Roy Nelson due to a back injury that required surgery. Nelson was then pulled from the card altogether.

On October 28, 2010, UFC president Dana White announced that World Extreme Cagefighting (WEC) would merge with the UFC and that WEC Featherweight Champion José Aldo would be promoted to UFC Featherweight Champion. Josh Grispi was pulled from a planned WEC 52 bout with Erik Koch to challenge Aldo for the Featherweight title at this event. However, Aldo was later forced off the card with an injury. Grispi remained on the card and fought Dustin Poirier.

A lightweight bout between Cole Miller and Matt Wiman, which was originally scheduled to take place at this event, was moved to UFC: Fight For The Troops 2.

UFC 125 preliminary fights were shown live for the first time on Ion Television in the United States. The preliminary fights were shown live in the United Kingdom on ESPN, Rogers Sportsnet in Canada and Fuel TV in Australia.

== Results ==
Main card
Weight class				Method	Round	Time	Notes
Lightweight	Frankie Edgar (c)	vs.	Gray Maynard	Draw (split) (46–48, 48–46, 47–47)	5	5:00	(Note: For the UFC Lightweight Championship)
Middleweight	Brian Stann	def.	Chris Leben	TKO (knee and punches)	1	3:37
Light Heavyweight	Thiago Silva	vs	Brandon Vera	NC (overturned)	3	2:10
Welterweight	Dong Hyun Kim	def.	Nate Diaz	Decision (unanimous) (29–28, 29–28, 29–28)	3	5:00
Lightweight	Clay Guida	def.	Takanori Gomi	Submission (guillotine choke)	2	4:27
Preliminary card (Ion TV)
Lightweight	Jeremy Stephens	def.	Marcus Davis	KO (punch)	3	2:33
Featherweight	Dustin Poirier	def.	Josh Grispi	Decision (unanimous) (30–27, 30–27, 30–27)	3	5:00
Middleweight	Brad Tavares	def.	Phil Baroni	KO (knees and punches)	1	4:20
Preliminary card
Featherweight	Diego Nunes	def.	Mike Brown	Decision (split) (29–28, 28–29, 29–28)	3	5:00
Welterweight	Daniel Roberts	def.	Greg Soto	Submission (kimura)	1	3:45
Lightweight	Jacob Volkmann	def.	Antonio McKee	Decision (split) (28–29, 29–28, 29–28)	3	5:00

== Bonus awards ==
The following fighters received $60,000 bonuses.

- Fight of the Night: Frankie Edgar vs. Gray Maynard
- Knockout of the Night: Jeremy Stephens
- Submission of the Night: Clay Guida

== Reported payout ==
The following is the reported payout to the fighters as reported to the Nevada State Athletic Commission. It does not include sponsor money or "locker room" bonuses often given by the UFC and also do not include the UFC's traditional "fight night" bonuses.

- Frankie Edgar: $102,000 ($51,000 win bonus) vs. Gray Maynard: $52,000 ($26,000 win bonus) ^
- Brian Stann: $122,000 ($21,000 win bonus) def. Chris Leben: $96,000
- Thiago Silva: $110,000 ($55,000 win bonus) def. Brandon Vera: $70,000
- Dong Hyun Kim: $70,000 ($35,000 win bonus) def. Nate Diaz: $63,000
- Clay Guida: $62,000 ($31,000 win bonus) def. Takanori Gomi: $50,000
- Jeremy Stephens: $36,000 ($18,000 win bonus) def. Marcus Davis: $31,000
- Dustin Poirier: $8,000 ($4,000 win bonus) def. Josh Grispi: $15,000
- Brad Tavares: $16,000 ($8,000 win bonus) def. Phil Baroni: $25,000
- Diego Nunes: $20,000 ($10,000 win bonus) def. Mike Brown: $23,000
- Daniel Roberts: $24,000 ($12,000 win bonus) def. Greg Soto: $8,000
- Jacob Volkmann: $24,000 ($12,000 win bonus) def. Antonio McKee: $15,000

^Although not reflected in the NSAC paperwork, both Edgar and Maynard received their win bonuses despite the draw.
