= UFC 136 =

UFC mixed martial arts event in 2011

UFC 136: Edgar vs. Maynard III
- The poster for UFC 136: Edgar vs. Maynard III
- Promotion: Ultimate Fighting Championship
- Date: October 8, 2011
- Venue: Toyota Center
- City: Houston, Texas
- Attendance: 16,164
- Total gate: $2,230,000
- Buyrate: 225,000

Event chronology
UFC Live: Cruz vs. Johnson	UFC 136: Edgar vs. Maynard III	UFC 137: Penn vs. Diaz

UFC 136: Edgar vs. Maynard III was a mixed martial arts event held by the Ultimate Fighting Championship on October 8, 2011, at the Toyota Center in Houston, Texas. The event coincided with a two-day UFC Fan Expo held at the George R. Brown Convention Center.

== Background ==
UFC 136 featured two preliminary fights live on Spike TV.

Josh Grispi was expected to face Matt Grice at the event, but Grispi was forced off the card with an injury and replaced by Nam Phan. Grice himself was also forced from the card with an undisclosed injury and replaced by Leonard Garcia.

Aaron Simpson was expected to face Nick Catone at the event but Catone was forced off the card with an injury and replaced by Eric Schafer.

Mike Russow was scheduled to fight Dave Herman at the event, but the bout was cancelled after Herman failed his preliminary drug test in which he tested positive for marijuana. Herman denies using the prohibited substance.

This event held the UFC record for most time spent in actual fighting at 158 minutes and 32 seconds, beating the last record holder UFC Fight Night: Maynard vs. Diaz, which was 149 minutes and 50 seconds. UFC Fight Night: Werdum vs. Tybura would later break this record on November 19, 2017, with a total of 184 minutes and 18 seconds of cage time.

== Results ==
Main card
Weight class				Method	Round	Time	Notes
Lightweight	Frankie Edgar (c)	def.	Gray Maynard	TKO (punches)	4	3:54	(Note: For the UFC Lightweight Championship.)
Featherweight	José Aldo (c)	def.	Kenny Florian	Decision (unanimous) (49–46, 49–46, 49–46)	5	5:00	(Note: For the UFC Featherweight Championship.)
Middleweight	Chael Sonnen	def.	Brian Stann	Submission (arm-triangle choke)	2	3:51
Featherweight	Nam Phan	def.	Leonard Garcia	Decision (unanimous) (29–28, 29–28, 29–28)	3	5:00
Lightweight	Joe Lauzon	def.	Melvin Guillard	Submission (rear-naked choke)	1	0:47
Preliminary card (Spike TV)
Middleweight	Demian Maia	def.	Jorge Santiago	Decision (unanimous) (30–27, 30–27, 30–27)	3	5:00
Lightweight	Anthony Pettis	def.	Jeremy Stephens	Decision (split) (29–28, 28–29, 29–28)	3	5:00
Preliminary card (Facebook)
Heavyweight	Stipe Miocic	def.	Joey Beltran	Decision (unanimous) (29–28, 30–27, 29–28)	3	5:00	(Note: This bout aired on the broadcast following the Edgar vs Maynard bout.)
Featherweight	Darren Elkins	def.	Tiequan Zhang	Decision (unanimous) (30–27, 30–26, 30–27)	3	5:00
Middleweight	Aaron Simpson	def.	Eric Schafer	Decision (unanimous) (30–27, 30–27, 30–27)	3	5:00
Middleweight	Mike Massenzio	def.	Steve Cantwell	Decision (unanimous) (29–28, 30–27, 29–28)	3	5:00	(Note: This bout aired on the broadcast following the Miocic vs Beltran bout.)

== Bonus awards ==
The following fighters received $75,000 bonuses.

- Fight of the Night: Nam Phan vs. Leonard Garcia
- Knockout of the Night: Frankie Edgar
- Submission of the Night: Joe Lauzon
