= Cheick Kongo =

French former mixed martial artist

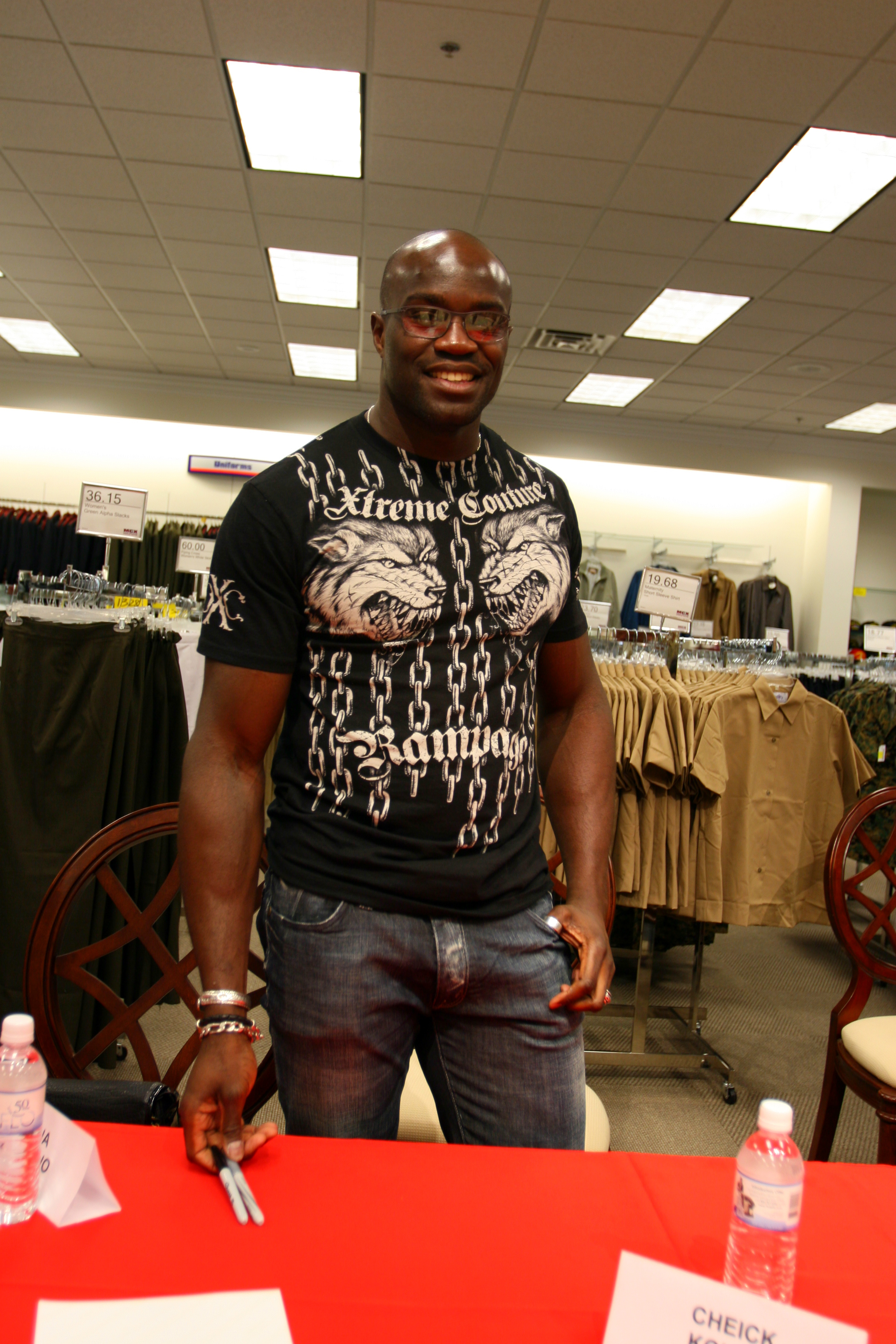
- Born: May 17, 1975 (age 51); Paris, France
- Height: 6 ft 4 in (193 cm)
- Weight: 242 lb (110 kg; 17 st 4 lb)
- Division: Heavyweight
- Reach: 81 in (206 cm)
- Style: Kickboxing
- Stance: Orthodox
- Team: Kongo Smashin' Club; Wolfslair MMA Academy; Huntington Beach Training Center
- Rank: Black belt in Karate; Black belt in Kendo; Brown belt in Pencak Silat Persaudaraan Setia Hati Terate
- Years active: 2001–present (MMA)

Kickboxing record
- Total: 23
- Wins: 21
- By knockout: 12
- Losses: 2

Mixed martial arts record
- Total: 46
- Wins: 31
- By knockout: 15
- By submission: 4
- By decision: 12
- Losses: 12
- By knockout: 3
- By submission: 1
- By decision: 8
- Draws: 2
- No contests: 1

Other information
- Mixed martial arts record from Sherdog
- Last updated on: October 17, 2010

Cheick Kongo (born May 17, 1975) is a French mixed martial artist and former kickboxer who fights in the Heavyweight division. A professional MMA competitor since 2001, he has also competed for the Ultimate Fighting Championship and Bellator.

== Early life ==
Born to a Burkinabé father and a Congolese mother, Kongo began training in martial arts when he was 5 years old, learning Kendo and Karate. As he grew older, he had already received a black belt in both styles and began to expand his repertoire and trained in Boxing, Muay Thai, Savate, and Greco Roman Wrestling at the age of 19. At the age of 23 he learned Pencak Silat Persaudaraan Setia Hati Terate under the tutelage of Charles Joussoat and Franck Ropers, who learned it from C. N. Hardjono Turpijn, the pioneer of Pencak Silat PSHT in Europe. Kongo was introduced to Shootfighting through Bas Rutten at age 25, and started his career in mixed martial arts in 2001. He is also a cousin of rugby star Fulgence Ouedraogo, the French back-rower. Cheick is also a columnist for the French MMA magazine, Top Fight.

== Mixed martial arts career ==
On June 10, 2001, Kongo began his professional career by knocking out Doog Ward. Kongo then followed up that win with a TKO over Dave van der Veen. He then lost his third professional MMA fight to Rodney Faverus by decision. He faced Gilbert Yvel on May 20, losing for the second time in his career when he tapped to strikes in the second round. He trained with Anderson Silva and Wanderlei Silva in the early days of Pride Fighting Championships.

=== Ultimate Fighting Championship ===
Kongo entered the UFC to fight Gilbert Aldana at UFC 61, whom he beat by TKO due to a doctor stoppage. Kongo followed up with a win over UFC newcomer Christian Wellisch by KO due to a knee strike, before losing to UFC newcomer Carmelo Marrero at UFC 64. Then, Kongo defeated Assuério Silva by majority decision at UFC 70.

At UFC 75 on September 8, 2007, he defeated Mirko Cro Cop by unanimous decision. Though there was controversy as Kongo kneed Cro Cop in the groin several times without having any points deducted, inspiring American MMA fans to give Kongo the nickname "Cup Cheick".

He fought against Heath Herring at UFC 82, losing by split decision. At UFC 87 he fought against UFC newcomer Dan "The Viking" Evensen, whom he defeated by first-round TKO.

Kongo fought at UFC 92 on December 27, 2008, where he beat former Cage Rage British Heavyweight champion Mostapha al-Turk by TKO. Kongo dropped Al Turk with two right hands. Then fired on a vicious ground and pound attack, Kongo pounced on al-Turk with elbows and punches, opening up a big cut above the eye. Referee Steve Mazzagatti stopped the fight after 4:37 of the first round.

In his next fight he defeated Antoni Hardonk at UFC 97 by second-round TKO.

Kongo replaced Heath Herring on three weeks notice at UFC 99 to face the up-and-coming Cain Velasquez in the co-main event. Kongo lost to Velasquez by unanimous decision in a one-sided affair. He did however, manage to drop Velasquez on two occasions with straight punches. It had been rumoured that if he was to defeat Velasquez, Kongo would earn a title shot against the winner of the UFC 100 Heavyweight Championship between Brock Lesnar and Frank Mir. Mir lost his bout against Lesnar and actually ended up fighting Kongo at UFC 107. During the pre-fight talk, Mir stated that Kongo had no ground game, so at the weigh ins Cheick Kongo turned his back to Mir, to be disrespectful. Mir won the fight by a submission. After connecting with a left overhand punch that dropped Kongo, Mir finished him with a guillotine choke, rendering Kongo unconscious just 72 seconds into the first round.

Kongo defeated Paul Buentello on March 21, 2010, at UFC Live: Vera vs. Jones by submission due to elbows.

Kongo was expected to face The Ultimate Fighter 10 winner Roy Nelson on July 3, 2010, at UFC 116 but a back injury to Kongo has caused the cancellation of the fight.

Kongo's next fight was against undefeated Travis Browne at UFC 120. They fought to a unanimous draw. Kongo repeatedly grabbed Browne's shorts and had 1 point deducted in the final round.

Kongo fought Pat Barry on June 26, 2011, at UFC on Versus 4. His fight against Barry became the main event since Nate Marquardt was not medically cleared for his welterweight debut against Rick Story. During the bout Kongo was dropped by a looping right hand. Visibly rocked, Kongo got back to his feet but was dropped again seconds later by another hard punch. Despite being dropped twice, Kongo was able to knock Barry out with a hard overhand right to the ear, followed by an uppercut to the chin to secure a win midway through the first round.

Kongo faced Matt Mitrione on October 29, 2011, at UFC 137. He won the fight via unanimous decision by utilizing his reach with his jab and securing multiple takedowns.

Kongo faced Mark Hunt on February 26, 2012, at UFC 144. He lost the fight via TKO in the first round.

Kongo was expected to face Antônio Rodrigo Nogueira on July 21, 2012, at UFC 149. However, Nogueira pulled out of the bout, citing that an arm injury sustained in his last bout against Frank Mir had not healed enough to resume the proper training and was replaced by Shawn Jordan. Kongo defeated Jordan via unanimous decision.

Kongo faced Roy Nelson on April 27, 2013, at UFC 159, they were supposed to meet before at UFC 116. He lost the fight via knockout in the first round. After his loss to Nelson, Kongo's UFC contract expired and he was released from the UFC.

Before UFC 159 the UFC offered Kongo a four-fight deal, which he turned down. Kongo left the UFC with a 11-6-1 record.

On May 4, 2013, Kongo stated that he is on good terms with the UFC and was quoted saying: "Don't believe he said-she said stories. I have not been cut by the UFC. I am Cheick Kongo so I know best what's next for me. It doesn't mean that I am leaving the UFC, it doesn't mean that I am staying – it means this is my life." Kongo has stated that he is open to the possibility of resigning a contract with the UFC.

=== Bellator MMA ===
Shortly after it was announced that Cheick's teammate Rampage Jackson was going to Bellator, it was stated that Kongo will be following his teammate. Kongo's move to Bellator was official on August 28, 2013.

Kongo made his debut in the Season 9 Heavyweight tournament. He faced Mark Godbeer on October 4, 2013, at Bellator 102. Kongo won the fight via TKO in the second round.

He was then expected to face Vinicius Queiroz in the tournament finals, on November 2, 2013, at Bellator 106. However, due to a change in the line up, the bout was canceled.

Bout between Kongo and Queiroz was then expected to take place on November 8, 2013, at Bellator 107. However, Queiroz was later forced to withdraw from the bout due to a knee injury and was replaced by Peter Graham. Kongo won the fight via unanimous decision.

Kongo faced undefeated Bellator Heavyweight Champion Vitaly Minakov at Bellator 115 on April 4, 2014. He lost the back-and-forth fight via unanimous decision. Kongo faced Eric Smith at Bellator 120 on May 17, 2014. He won the fight via TKO by way of knees and punches at 4:35 of Round 2.

Kongo faced fellow striker Lavar Johnson at Bellator 123 on September 5, 2014. He won the fight via rear-naked choke submission in the first round. This marked his first submission win that was not caused by strikes since 2003.

Kongo faced King Mo Lawal at Bellator 134: The British Invasion on February 27, 2015. He lost the fight via split decision.

Kongo faced former Bellator Heavyweight Champion Alexander Volkov on June 26, 2015, at Bellator 139. He won the fight via unanimous decision.

Kongo faced Vinicius Queiroz at Bellator 150 on February 26, 2016. In the third round, Kongo was dropped by a right hand, however, he was able to recover and win a split decision.

Kongo faced Tony Johnson at Bellator 161 on September 16, 2016. He won the fight via majority decision.

Kongo faced former training partner Oli Thompson at Bellator 172 on February 18, 2017. He won the fight by unanimous decision.

Kongo faced Augusto Sakai at Bellator 179 on May 19, 2017. He won the fight via split decision.

Kongo faced Javy Ayala at Bellator 199 on May 12 in San Jose, CA. He won the fight via knockout in the first round.

Kongo faced Timothy Johnson on October 13, 2018, at Bellator 208. He won the fight by knockout in the first round.

Kongo faced Vitaly Minakov for a second time on February 16, 2019, at Bellator 216 He won the fight by unanimous decision.

On July 11, 2019, it was announced that Kongo will be facing Ryan Bader for the Bellator Heavyweight World Championship on September 7 at Bellator 226. The bout ended in a no contest at 3:52 of the first round after an accidental eye poke from Bader rendered Kongo unable to continue.

On May 4, 2020, it was revealed that Kongo had signed a multi-fight contract with Bellator.

On October 10, 2020, Kongo fought in a rematch Timothy Johnson at Bellator 248 in Paris, France. He lost via split decision.

Kongo faced Sergei Kharitonov on August 20, 2021, at Bellator 265. He won the fight via a rear-naked choke in round two.

Kongo faced Ryan Bader for the Bellator Heavyweight World Championship on May 6, 2022, at Bellator 280. He lost the bout via unanimous decision.

== Championships and accomplishments ==
=== Kickboxing ===
- 2005 World Champion Federation King of the Rings
- 2005 King of Colosseum Tournament Champion
- 2005 Rings World Champion
- 2004 King of the Ring Super World Champion
- 2004 Muay Thai World Champion
- 2003 Intercontinental Muay Thai Champion
- 2002 RINGS European Champion
- 2001 RINGS European Vice Champion
- European Savate Champion

=== Mixed martial arts ===
- Bellator MMA
  - Bellator Season 9 Heavyweight Tournament Championship
  - Most fights in Bellator Heavyweight division history (18)
  - Most victories in Bellator Heavyweight division history (13)
- Ultimate Fighting Championship
  - Knockout of the Night (One time) vs. Pat Barry
  - UFC.com Awards
    - 2007: Ranked #8 Upset of the Year vs. Mirko Cro Cop
    - 2009: Ranked #7 Loss of the Year vs. Cain Velasquez
    - 2011: Knockout of the Year vs. Pat Barry
- King of the Ring
  - KOTR Super World Champion -103 kg
- World MMA Awards
  - 2011 Comeback of the Year vs. Pat Barry at UFC Live: Kongo vs. Barry
- Inside MMA
  - 2011 KO Punch of the Year Bazzie Award vs. Pat Barry

== Mixed martial arts record ==
Professional record breakdown
46 matches	31 wins	12 losses
By knockout	15	3
By submission	4	1
By decision	12	8
Draws	2	
No contests	1	

Res.	Record	Opponent	Method	Event	Date	Round	Time	Location	Notes
Loss	31–12–2 (1)	Ryan Bader	Decision (unanimous)	Bellator 280	May 6, 2022	5	5:00	Paris, France	For the Bellator Heavyweight World Championship.
Win	31–11–2 (1)	Sergei Kharitonov	Submission (rear-naked choke)	Bellator 265	August 20, 2021	2	4:59	Sioux Falls, South Dakota, United States	
Loss	30–11–2 (1)	Timothy Johnson	Decision (split)	Bellator 248	October 10, 2020	3	5:00	Paris, France	
NC	30–10–2 (1)	Ryan Bader	NC (accidental eye poke)	Bellator 226	September 7, 2019	1	3:52	San Jose, California, United States	For the Bellator Heavyweight World Championship. Accidental eye poke rendered Kongo unable to continue.
Win	30–10–2	Vitaly Minakov	Decision (unanimous)	Bellator 216	February 16, 2019	3	5:00	Uncasville, Connecticut, United States	Bellator Heavyweight title eliminator.
Win	29–10–2	Timothy Johnson	KO (punches)	Bellator 208	October 13, 2018	1	1:08	Uniondale, New York, United States	
Win	28–10–2	Javy Ayala	KO (punches)	Bellator 199	May 12, 2018	1	2:29	San Jose, California, United States	
Win	27–10–2	Augusto Sakai	Decision (split)	Bellator 179	May 19, 2017	3	5:00	London, England	
Win	26–10–2	Oli Thompson	Decision (unanimous)	Bellator 172	February 18, 2017	3	5:00	San Jose, California, United States	
Win	25–10–2	Tony Johnson	Decision (majority)	Bellator 161	September 16, 2016	3	5:00	Cedar Park, Texas, United States	
Win	24–10–2	Vinicius Queiroz	Decision (split)	Bellator 150	February 26, 2016	3	5:00	Mulvane, Kansas, United States	
Win	23–10–2	Alexander Volkov	Decision (unanimous)	Bellator 139	June 26, 2015	3	5:00	Mulvane, Kansas, United States	
Loss	22–10–2	Muhammed Lawal	Decision (split)	Bellator 134	February 27, 2015	3	5:00	Uncasville, Connecticut, United States	
Win	22–9–2	Lavar Johnson	Submission (rear-naked choke)	Bellator 123	September 5, 2014	1	3:27	Uncasville, Connecticut, United States	
Win	21–9–2	Eric Smith	TKO (knees and punches)	Bellator 120	May 17, 2014	2	4:35	Southaven, Mississippi, United States	
Loss	20–9–2	Vitaly Minakov	Decision (unanimous)	Bellator 115	April 4, 2014	5	5:00	Reno, Nevada, United States	For the Bellator Heavyweight World Championship.
Win	20–8–2	Peter Graham	Decision (unanimous)	Bellator 107	November 8, 2013	3	5:00	Thackerville, Oklahoma, United States	Bellator Season 9 Heavyweight Tournament Final.
Win	19–8–2	Mark Godbeer	TKO (knees and punches)	Bellator 102	October 4, 2013	2	2:04	Visalia, California, United States	Bellator Season 9 Heavyweight Tournament Semifinal.
Loss	18–8–2	Roy Nelson	KO (punches)	UFC 159	April 27, 2013	1	2:03	Newark, New Jersey, United States	
Win	18–7–2	Shawn Jordan	Decision (unanimous)	UFC 149	July 21, 2012	3	5:00	Calgary, Alberta, Canada	
Loss	17–7–2	Mark Hunt	TKO (punches)	UFC 144	February 26, 2012	1	2:11	Saitama, Japan	
Win	17–6–2	Matt Mitrione	Decision (unanimous)	UFC 137	October 29, 2011	3	5:00	Las Vegas, Nevada, United States	
Win	16–6–2	Pat Barry	KO (punch)	UFC Live: Kongo vs. Barry	June 26, 2011	1	2:39	Pittsburgh, Pennsylvania, United States	Knockout of the Night. Knockout of the Year.
Draw	15–6–2	Travis Browne	Draw (unanimous)	UFC 120	October 16, 2010	3	5:00	London, England	Kongo was deducted one point in round 3 for holding onto Browne's shorts.
Win	15–6–1	Paul Buentello	TKO (submission to elbows to the legs)	UFC Live: Vera vs. Jones	March 21, 2010	3	1:16	Broomfield, Colorado, United States	
Loss	14–6–1	Frank Mir	Technical Submission (guillotine choke)	UFC 107	December 12, 2009	1	1:12	Memphis, Tennessee, United States	
Loss	14–5–1	Cain Velasquez	Decision (unanimous)	UFC 99	June 13, 2009	3	5:00	Cologne, Germany	
Win	14–4–1	Antoni Hardonk	TKO (punches)	UFC 97	April 18, 2009	2	2:29	Montreal, Quebec, Canada	
Win	13–4–1	Mostapha al-Turk	TKO (elbows and punches)	UFC 92	December 27, 2008	1	4:37	Las Vegas, Nevada, United States	
Win	12–4–1	Dan Evensen	TKO (punches)	UFC 87	August 9, 2008	1	4:55	Minneapolis, Minnesota, United States	
Loss	11–4–1	Heath Herring	Decision (split)	UFC 82	March 1, 2008	3	5:00	Columbus, Ohio, United States	
Win	11–3–1	Mirko Cro Cop	Decision (unanimous)	UFC 75	September 8, 2007	3	5:00	London, England	
Win	10–3–1	Assuério Silva	Decision (majority)	UFC 70	April 21, 2007	3	5:00	Manchester, England	
Loss	9–3–1	Carmelo Marrero	Decision (split)	UFC 64	October 14, 2006	3	5:00	Las Vegas, Nevada, United States	
Win	9–2–1	Christian Wellisch	KO (knee)	UFC 62	August 26, 2006	1	2:51	Las Vegas, Nevada, United States	
Win	8–2–1	Gilbert Aldana	TKO (doctor stoppage)	UFC 61	July 8, 2006	1	4:13	Las Vegas, Nevada, United States	
Win	7–2–1	Dave Dalgliesh	TKO (punches)	Rings Holland: Men of Honor	December 11, 2005	2	N/A	Utrecht City, Utrecht	
Win	6–2–1	Gabor Nemeth	KO (punches)	King of the Ring: Mission Impossible	June 4, 2005	2	N/A	Zagreb, Croatia	Won KOTR -103 kg Super World Championship.
Loss	5–2–1	Gilbert Yvel	TKO (punches)	It's Showtime 2004 Amsterdam	May 20, 2004	2	4:40	Amsterdam, Netherlands	
Win	5–1–1	Joop Kasteel	KO (punch)	RINGS Holland: World's Greatest	April 4, 2004	1	4:31	Utrecht City, Utrecht	
Win	4–1–1	Dave Vader	Decision (unanimous)	RINGS Holland: The Untouchables	September 27, 2003	3	2:00	Utrecht City, Utrecht	
Win	3–1–1	Hans Nijman	Submission (armbar)	It's Showtime 2003 Amsterdam	June 8, 2003	2	0:59	Amsterdam, Netherlands	
Draw	2–1–1	Michael Knaap	Draw (unanimous)	It's Showtime: As Usual / Battle Time	September 29, 2002	2	5:00	Haarlem, North Holland	
Loss	2–1	Rodney Faverus	Decision (unanimous)	Rings Holland: Saved by the Bell	June 2, 2002	2	5:00	Amsterdam, Netherlands	
Win	2–0	Dave van der Veen	TKO (punches)	Rings Holland: Some Like It Hard	December 2, 2001	2	1:25	Utrecht City, Utrecht	
Win	1–0	André Tete	Submission (heel hook)	Rings Holland: No Guts, No Glory	June 10, 2001	1	3:20	Amsterdam, Netherlands	

== Kickboxing record (incomplete) ==
Kickboxing record (Incomplete)
21 wins (16 (T)KO's), 1 loss

Result	Opponent	Method	Event	Date	Round	Time	Location	Notes
Win	(Serbia) Dusko Basrak	TKO (punches)	King of Colosseum 2005	November 25, 2005	4	N/A	Mostar, Bosnia and Herzegovina	King of Colosseum 2005 tournament final.
Win	(Croatia) Mladen Brestovac	Decision (split)	King of Colosseum 2005	November 25, 2005	3	3:00	Mostar, Bosnia and Herzegovina	King of Colosseum 2005 tournament semifinal.
Win	(Hungary) Tihamer Brunner	KO	King of Colosseum 2005	November 25, 2005	N/A	N/A	Mostar, Bosnia and Herzegovina	King of Colosseum 2005 tournament quarterfinal.
Loss	(Brazil) Glaube Feitosa	Decision (unanimous)	Ichigeki Paris 2005	March 19, 2005	3	3:00	Paris, France	
Win	(Croatia) Sinisa Andrijasevic	TKO (knee to the liver)	King of the Ring	March 5, 2004	2	N/A	Priština, Serbia and Montenegro	Won KOTR Muay Thai rules, -105 kg Super World Championship.
Win	(Poland) Marcin Rozalski	TKO (knees)	N/A	N/A	3	N/A	Paris, France	

Legend: Win Loss Draw/No contest

== See also ==
- List of male mixed martial artists
- List of male kickboxers
