= Brock Lesnar =

American retired professional wrestler (born 1977)

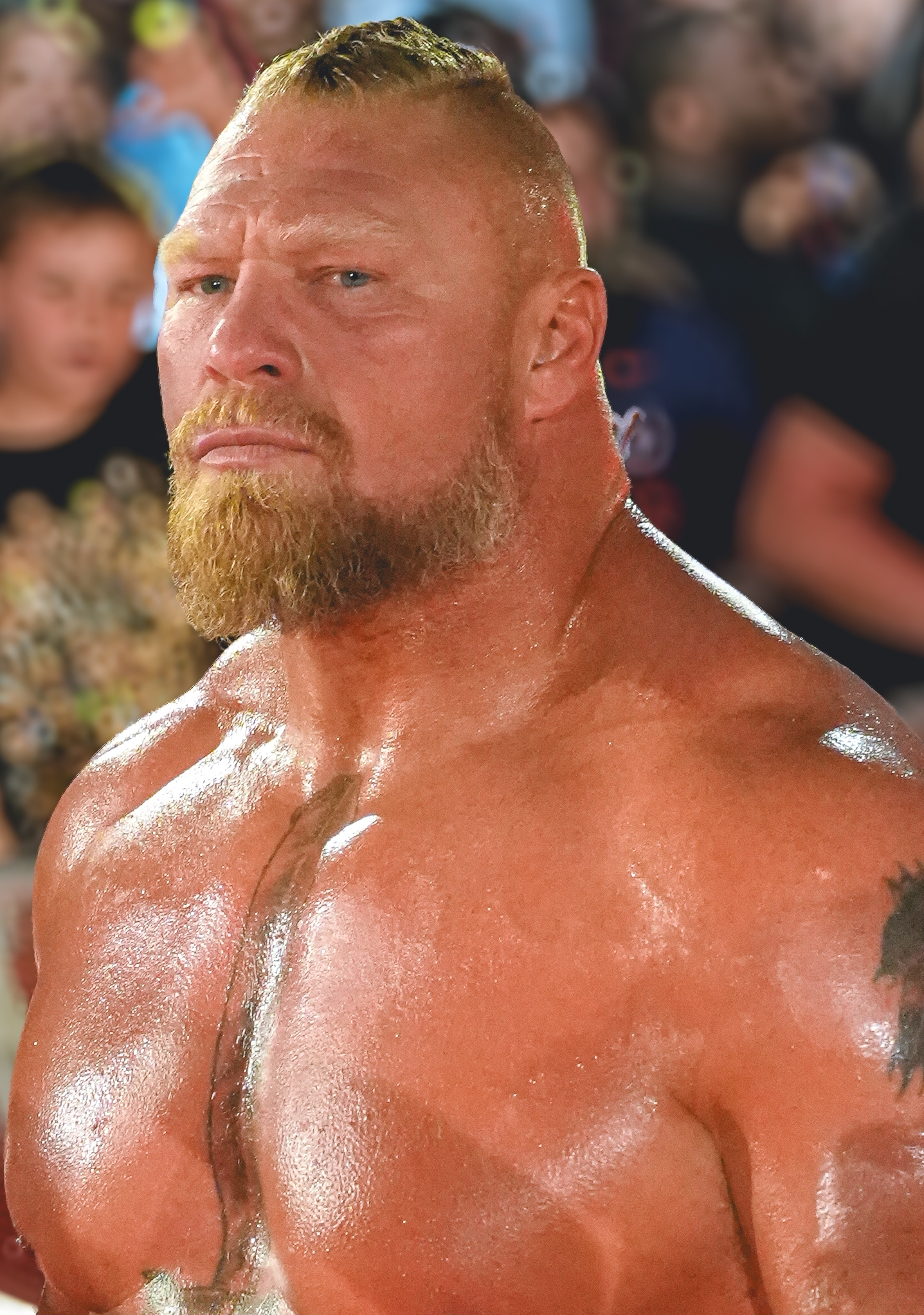
- Lesnar in 2023
- Born: Brock Edward Lesnar; July 12, 1977 (age 49); Webster, South Dakota, U.S.
- Occupations: Professional wrestler, mixed martial artist, American football player
- Years active: 2000–2007; 2012–2026; (professional wrestling); 2004 (football); 2007–2011; 2016 (MMA)
- Spouse: Sable (m. 2006)
- Children: 4, including Mya
- Professional wrestling career
- Ring name: Brock Lesnar
- Billed height: 6 ft 3 in (191 cm)
- Billed weight: 286 lb (130 kg)
- Billed from: Minneapolis, Minnesota; Suplex City; University of Minnesota
- Trained by: Brad Rheingans; Curt Hennig; Dean Malenko; Doug Basham; Nightmare Danny Davis
- Debut: October 11, 2000
- Retired: August 1, 2026
- Martial arts career
- Height: 6 ft 3 in (191 cm)
- Weight: 265 lb (120 kg; 18 st 13 lb)
- Division: Heavyweight
- Reach: 81 in (206 cm)
- Style: Wrestling
- Stance: Orthodox
- Fighting out of: Regina, Saskatchewan, Canada
- Team: DeathClutch Gym
- Trainer: Marty Morgan; MMA: Greg Nelson, Erik Paulson; Boxing: Peter Welch; Jiu-Jitsu: Rodrigo Medeiros
- Rank: Blue belt in Brazilian jiu-jitsu under Rodrigo Medeiros
- Wrestling: NCAA Division I Wrestling

Mixed martial arts record
- Total: 9
- Wins: 5
- By knockout: 3
- By submission: 1
- By decision: 1
- Losses: 3
- By knockout: 2
- By submission: 1
- No contests: 1

Other information
- Mixed martial arts record from Sherdog
Medal record
Collegiate Wrestling
Representing the Minnesota Golden Gophers
NCAA Division I Championships
Gold medal – first place	2000 St. Louis	285 lb
Silver medal – second place	1999 State College	285 lb

Brock Edward Lesnar (/ˈlɛznər/ LEZ-nər; born July 12, 1977) is an American retired professional wrestler, former mixed martial artist, amateur wrestler, and professional American football player. As a wrestler, he is best known for his numerous tenures in WWE between 2000 and 2026. Lesnar is the only person to have won the primary heavyweight championships of WWE, Ultimate Fighting Championship (UFC), New Japan Pro-Wrestling (NJPW), the Inoki Genome Federation (IGF), and the National Collegiate Athletic Association (NCAA).

Lesnar competed in collegiate wrestling for the University of Minnesota, winning the NCAA Division I national championship in 2000. He soon signed with the World Wrestling Federation (WWF, renamed WWE in 2002), rising to industry prominence in mid-2002 by winning the WWE Championship at age 25, setting the record for the youngest performer to win the championship. In 2004, Lesnar departed WWE to join the Minnesota Vikings of the National Football League (NFL), but was cut from the team during pre-season. He returned to wrestling and signed with NJPW in 2005 where he won the IWGP Heavyweight Championship. Lesnar later departed NJPW and continued to be promoted as the IWGP Heavyweight Champion in the IGF before taking a hiatus from wrestling to pursue a career in mixed martial arts (MMA). Years later in 2012, he re-signed with WWE; his 504-day first reign with the now-defunct WWE Universal Championship is the seventh-longest world championship reign in the promotion's history and he had the most reigns with the title at three. He also won the Royal Rumble match twice (2003 and 2022), the Money in the Bank ladder match (2019), the King of the Ring tournament (2002), and ended The Undertaker's undefeated WrestleMania streak in 2014. He had his retirement match in the main event of Night 1 of SummerSlam in 2026.

Lesnar began his MMA career for Hero's in 2007, and signed with the UFC in 2008. He quickly won the UFC Heavyweight Championship, but was sidelined with diverticulitis in 2009. On his return in 2010, Lesnar defeated Interim UFC Heavyweight Champion Shane Carwin to unify the heavyweight championships and become the undisputed UFC Heavyweight Champion. After two losses and further struggles with diverticulitis, Lesnar retired from MMA in 2011. He returned at UFC 200 in 2016 to defeat Mark Hunt, but his victory was overturned to a no-contest after he tested positive for a banned substance on UFC's anti-doping policy. He then retired from MMA for the second time in 2017. A box office sensation, he competed in some of the bestselling pay-per-view events in promotion history, including headlining UFC 91, UFC 100, UFC 116 and UFC 121. He also co-headlined UFC 200, briefly being the main headliner before that spot was given to Amanda Nunes vs. Miesha Tate.

== Early life ==
Brock Edward Lesnar was born in Webster, South Dakota, on July 12, 1977, the son of Stephanie and Richard Lesnar. Even though his surname is Slovenian, he is of Polish descent, and grew up on his parents' dairy farm in Webster. He has two older brothers named Troy and Chad, and a younger sister named Brandi. At the age of 17, he joined the Army National Guard and was assigned to an office job after his red–green colorblindness was deemed hazardous to his desire to work with explosives. He was discharged after failing a computer typing test and later worked for a construction company.

== Amateur wrestling ==
Lesnar attended Webster High School, playing football and competing in wrestling, placing third in the state championships his senior year. He then went to Bismarck State College where in 1997, his freshman year, he placed 5th in the 275 lb. division of the National Junior College Athletic Association (NJCAA). In 1998, his sophomore year, he won the 275 lb championship. After two years at Bismarck State College, Lesnar transferred to the University of Minnesota on a wrestling scholarship, where he was roommates with future WWE colleague Shelton Benjamin, who was also his assistant coach.

Lesnar won the 2000 National Collegiate Athletic Association (NCAA) Division I heavyweight wrestling championship his senior year after being the runner-up to Stephen Neal the year prior. He finished his amateur career as a two-time NJCAA All-American, the 1998 NJCAA Heavyweight Champion, two-time NCAA All-American, two-time Big Ten Conference Champion and the 2000 NCAA Heavyweight Champion, with a record of 106–5 overall in four years of college.

== Professional wrestling career ==
=== World Wrestling Federation / World Wrestling Entertainment (2000–2004) ===
==== Ohio Valley Wrestling (2000–2002) ====
In 2000, Lesnar signed a developmental contract with the World Wrestling Federation (WWF) and was assigned to its Ohio Valley Wrestling (OVW) territory. There, Lesnar met Paul Heyman, who would later become his on-screen manager. Under the direction of OVW booker Jim Cornette, Lesnar was paired with his former University of Minnesota teammate Shelton Benjamin. Competing as the Minnesota Stretching Crew, the duo held the OVW Southern Tag Team Championship three times. Lesnar also took part in numerous dark matches in 2001 and early 2002 before being called up to the main roster.

==== Rise to prominence and departure (2002–2004) ====
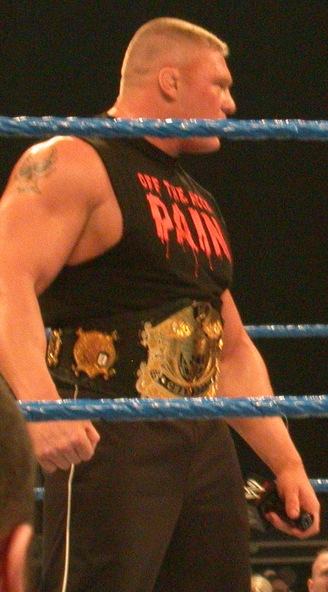
Lesnar during his third run as WWE Champion

Brock Lesnar, accompanied by Heyman, made his television debut on the March 18, 2002, episode of Raw, interfering in a Hardcore Championship match by attacking Al Snow, Maven, and Spike Dudley. Heyman began referring to Lesnar as "The Next Big Thing," a nickname that would be integrated into Lesnar's character presentation. During the WWF's 2002 brand extension, Lesnar was initially assigned to the Raw roster. Lesnar was quickly featured in a storyline feud with the Hardy Boyz. At Backlash on April 21, he had his first televised match, defeating Jeff Hardy via referee stoppage. The following night, he secured a similar victory over Matt Hardy on Raw. Although he and Shawn Stasiak lost to the Hardy Boyz at Insurrextion on May 4, Lesnar and Heyman scored a win over them at Judgment Day on May 19, held shortly after the company transitioned from WWF to WWE. In June, Lesnar won the 2002 King of the Ring tournament, defeating Rob Van Dam in the finals at King of the Ring on June 23. As part of the tournament's stipulations, the win earned him a WWE Undisputed Championship match at SummerSlam on August 25. Leading into the event, he lost to Van Dam by disqualification at Vengeance on July 21 in a match for the Intercontinental Championship. On July 22, Lesnar was moved to the SmackDown brand, where he continued to be positioned as a dominant competitor. On the August 8 episode of SmackDown!, he became the second wrestler to defeat Hulk Hogan via submission. At SummerSlam, Lesnar defeated The Rock to capture the WWE Undisputed Championship, becoming the youngest WWE Champion at age 25. His win also marked one of the fastest title ascensions in company history, reaching the top championship 126 days after his televised debut. Following his victory, storyline authority figures divided the championship between brands, with Lesnar declared exclusive to SmackDown and Raw introducing the World Heavyweight Championship. The WWE Undisputed Championship was subsequently renamed the WWE Championship.

Lesnar's initial title reign included rivalries with The Undertaker, and Big Show. He retained the championship against The Undertaker via double disqualification at Unforgiven on September 22, and in a Hell in a Cell match at No Mercy on October 20, but lost the title to Big Show at Survivor Series on November 17 following interference from Heyman, in a storyline betrayal that marked Lesnar's first televised pinfall loss and his transition to a fan-favorite character. At the Royal Rumble on January 19, 2003, Lesnar defeated Big Show to enter the Royal Rumble match, which he won by last eliminating The Undertaker, earning a title shot at WrestleMania XIX on March 30.

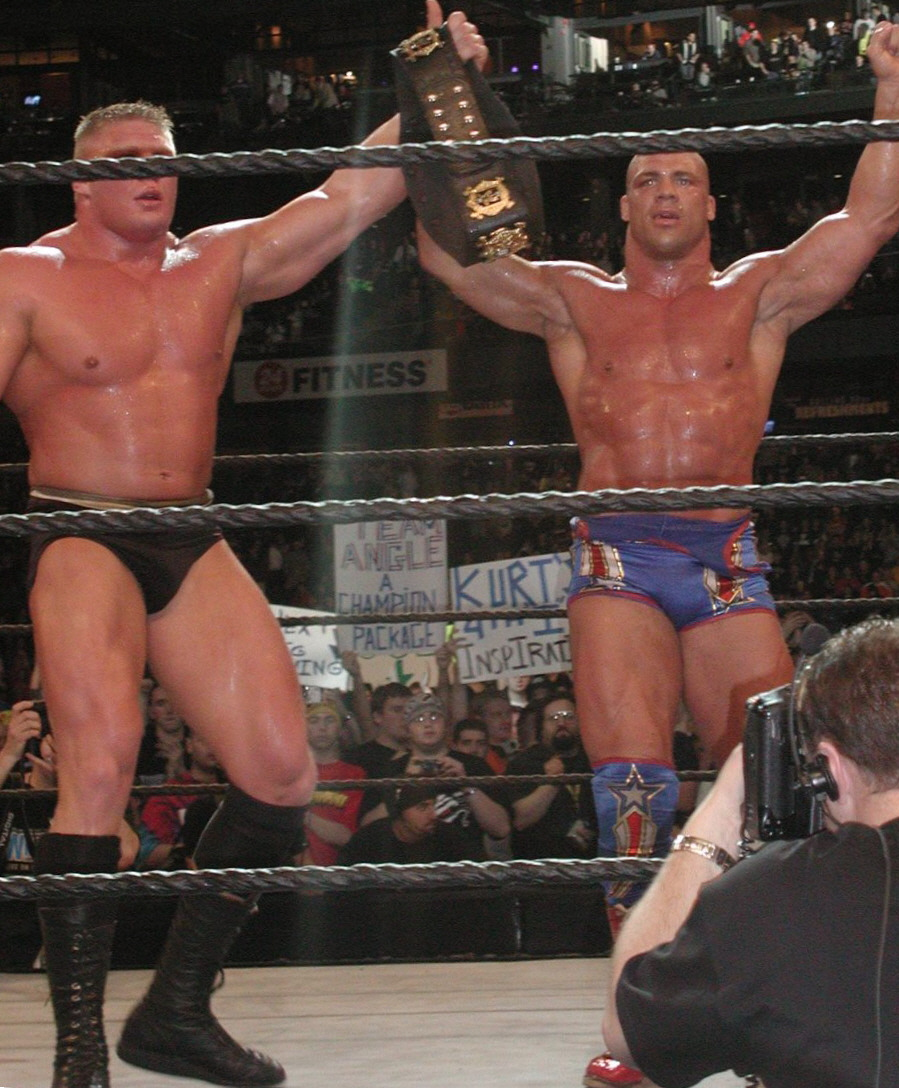
Lesnar and Kurt Angle after their WWE Championship title match at WrestleMania XIX.

At WrestleMania, Lesnar defeated Kurt Angle to win the WWE Championship for a second time. During the match, Lesnar attempted a shooting star press, which resulted in a legitimate concussion. He defended the title against John Cena at Backlash on April 27, and against Big Show in a stretcher match at Judgment Day on May 18. He faced Big Show again on the June 12 episode of SmackDown!, during which a superplex by Lesnar caused the ring to collapse.

Angle returned later in the year, leading to a feud with Lesnar. The rivalry culminated at Vengeance on July 27, where Lesnar lost the WWE Championship to Angle in a triple threat match also involving Big Show. Lesnar turned heel shortly after, aligning himself with Vince McMahon. He failed to regain the title at SummerSlam on August 24, but defeated Angle in a 60-minute iron man match on the September 18 episode of SmackDown!, winning five falls to four to reclaim the championship.

Lesnar's third WWE Championship reign included successful title defenses against challengers such as Chris Benoit and The Undertaker, the latter in a Biker Chain match at No Mercy on October 19. At Survivor Series on November 16, Lesnar captained a team in a traditional elimination tag team match against a team led by Kurt Angle, which Lesnar's team lost.

In late 2003, Lesnar began a cross-brand feud with Goldberg, who interrupted a backstage interview at Survivor Series. He later retained the WWE Championship against Hardcore Holly at the Royal Rumble on January 25, 2004. The rivalry with Goldberg escalated when Lesnar interfered in the Royal Rumble match, costing Goldberg a chance at victory. At No Way Out on February 15, Goldberg retaliated by attacking Lesnar during his title defense against Eddie Guerrero, leading to Lesnar's loss and the end of his championship reign.

Lesnar faced Goldberg at WrestleMania XX on March 14, with Stone Cold Steve Austin serving as special guest referee. The match was met with a hostile crowd response, as both men were widely reported to be leaving the company. Goldberg won the bout, and both he and Lesnar were given Stone Cold Stunners afterward. Lesnar officially left WWE after WrestleMania, later citing burnout, injuries, creative dissatisfaction, and the travel schedule as reasons for his departure.

=== New Japan Pro-Wrestling / Inoki Genome Federation (2005–2007) ===
After leaving professional football, Lesnar returned to wrestling in 2005 by debuting in New Japan Pro-Wrestling (NJPW). On October 8, he won the IWGP Heavyweight Championship in his first bout, defeating Kazuyuki Fujita and Masahiro Chono in a three-way match at the Tokyo Dome. Lesnar used the name The Verdict for his finishing move—previously known as the F-5—as a reference to ongoing legal disputes with WWE, who unsuccessfully sought to prevent him from competing in sports and entertainment elsewhere.

Lesnar defended the IWGP title against several opponents, including Shinsuke Nakamura at the January 4, 2006 Tokyo Dome event, Akebono in March, and Giant Bernard in May. However, in July 2006, NJPW stripped Lesnar of the championship, citing visa issues that prevented him from returning to defend it. Despite this, Lesnar retained physical possession of the belt for nearly a year.

On June 29, 2007, Lesnar lost the IWGP title to TNA World Heavyweight Champion Kurt Angle at the debut event of the Inoki Genome Federation (IGF). This marked Lesnar's final professional wrestling match until his return to WWE in 2012.

=== Return to WWE (2012–2020) ===
==== Return and ending The Streak (2012–2014) ====
Lesnar returned to WWE on the April 2, 2012, episode of Raw, confronting John Cena and reestablishing himself as a heel. He was presented as a destructive force brought in to "legitimize" WWE, leading to a match against Cena at Extreme Rules on April 29, where Lesnar was defeated despite dominating much of the contest.

Shortly afterward, Lesnar entered a storyline dispute with WWE COO Triple H over contractual demands, leading to a physical altercation that resulted in a kayfabe arm injury to Triple H. Paul Heyman returned as Lesnar's legal representative, escalating the angle with a lawsuit and Lesnar's declared departure. The feud culminated at SummerSlam on August 19, where Lesnar defeated Triple H by submission. The following night on Raw, it was announced that Lesnar had seemingly quit WWE.

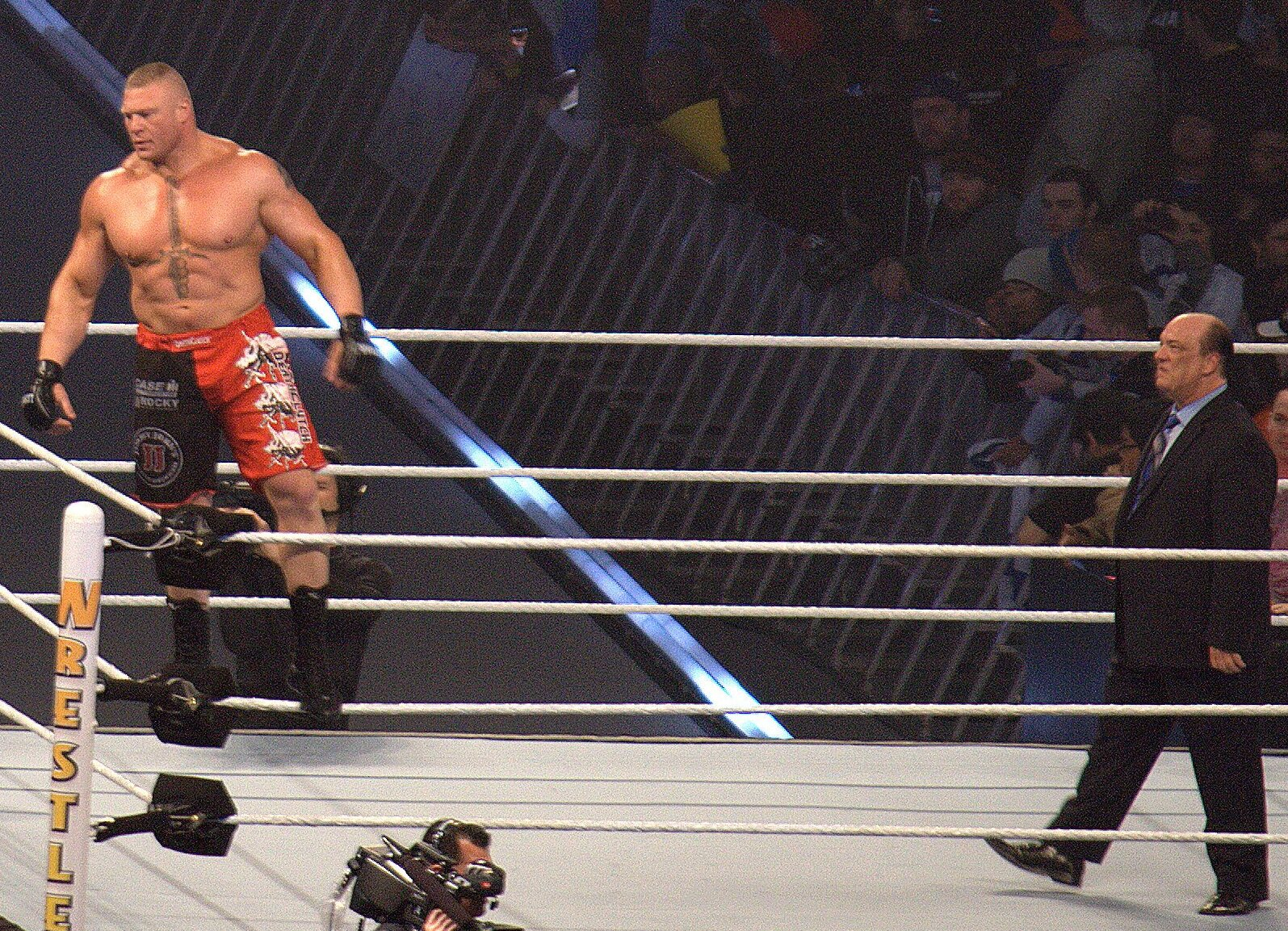
Lesnar with Paul Heyman at WrestleMania 29

He returned on the January 28, 2013, episode of Raw, attacking WWE chairman Vince McMahon, resulting in a scripted pelvic injury. A confrontation with Triple H reignited their rivalry, leading to a match at WrestleMania 29 on April 7, where Lesnar was defeated in a No Holds Barred match with Triple H's career at stake. The feud concluded at Extreme Rules on May 19, where Lesnar won their final encounter inside a steel cage.

In mid-2013, Lesnar began a feud with CM Punk after attacking him on the June 17 episode of Raw, following tension between Punk and Paul Heyman. After Heyman turned on Punk at Money in the Bank on July 14, the rivalry escalated, leading to a no disqualification match at SummerSlam on August 18, where Lesnar defeated Punk.

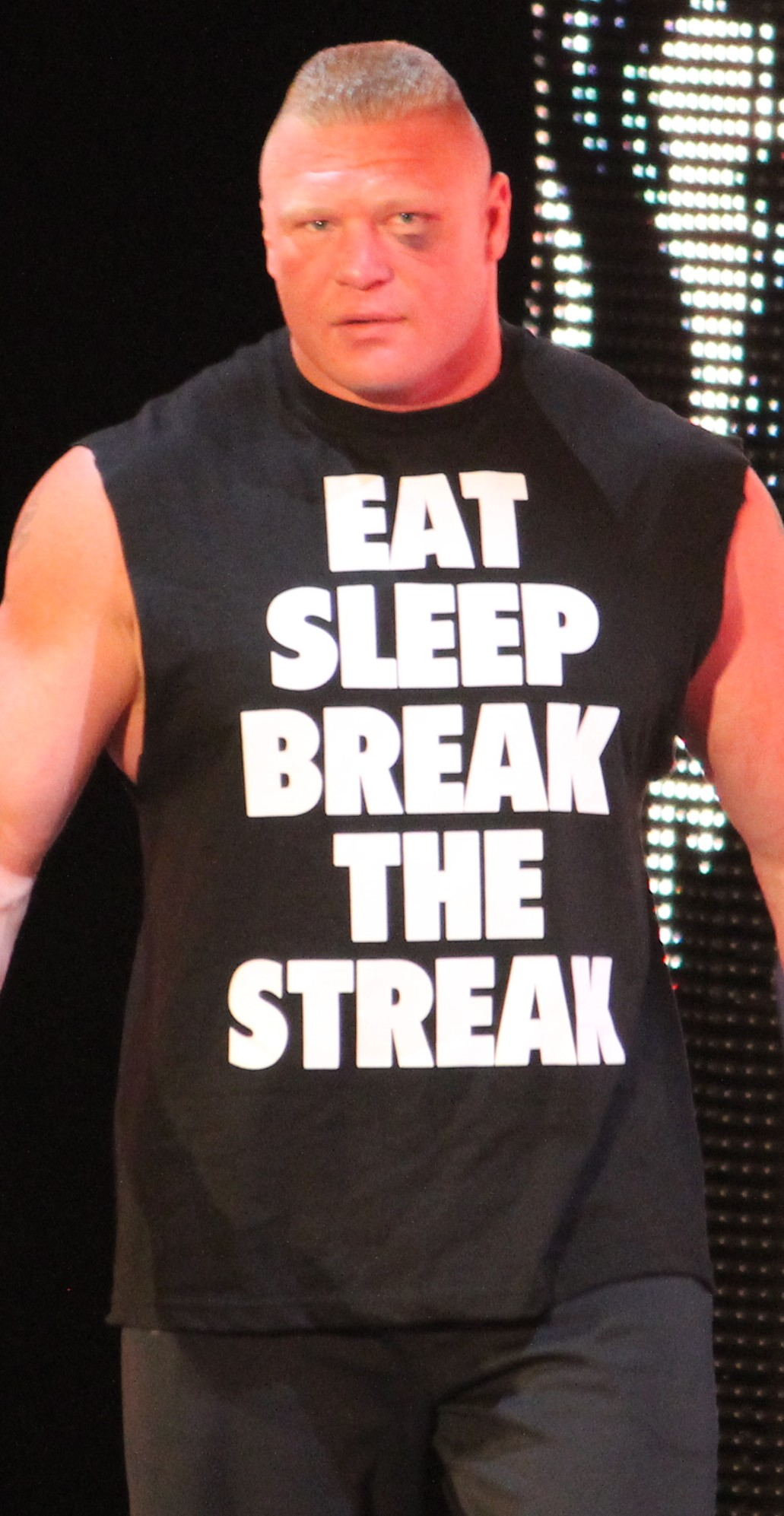
Lesnar broke The Undertaker's undefeated WrestleMania streak in 2014.

Lesnar returned on the December 30 episode of Raw, positioning himself as a contender for the WWE World Heavyweight Championship. After attacking Mark Henry and engaging in a brief feud with Big Show, which ended in a dominant win at the Royal Rumble on January 26, 2014, Lesnar was granted an open contract for a match at WrestleMania XXX on April 6. On the February 24 episode of Raw, The Undertaker returned and accepted the challenge, setting up their match for the event. At WrestleMania, Lesnar defeated The Undertaker, ending his 21–0 undefeated streak. The result received widespread media attention and is often cited as one of the most shocking moments in WWE history.

==== WWE World Heavyweight Champion (2014–2015) ====
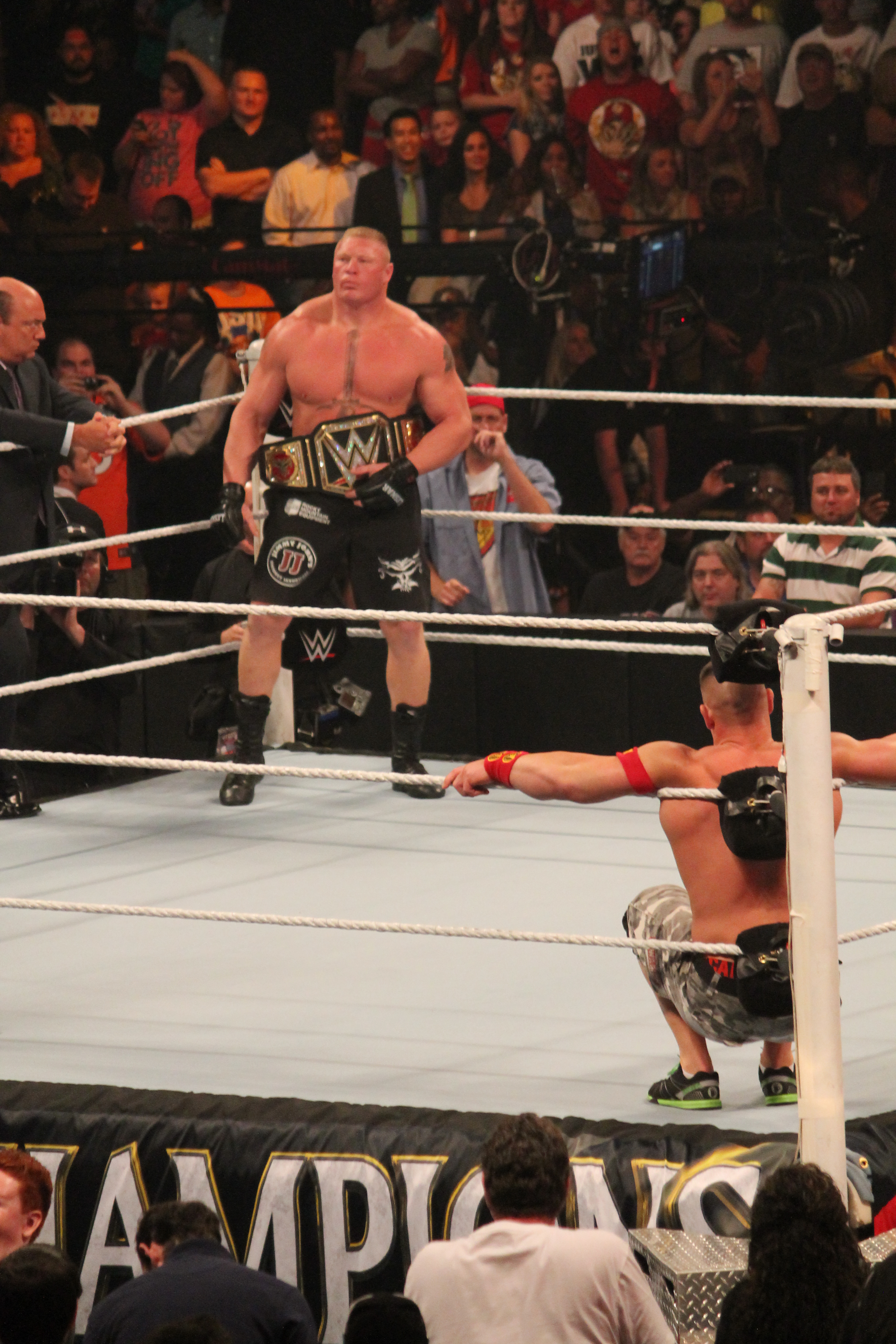
Lesnar defending his WWE World Heavyweight Championship against Cena at Night of Champions in September 2014

At SummerSlam on August 17, Lesnar defeated John Cena to win the WWE World Heavyweight Championship in dominant fashion, delivering sixteen suplexes and two F-5s with little offense from Cena. In their rematch at Night of Champions, Lesnar retained the title after Seth Rollins interfered, causing a disqualification. Rollins later aligned with The Authority and was added to Lesnar and Cena's title match at the Royal Rumble on January 25, 2015, which Lesnar won.

Lesnar's next challenger was Roman Reigns, who won the Royal Rumble match to earn a title shot at WrestleMania 31 on March 29. During their match at the WrestleMania main event, Lesnar dominated early and famously uttered "Suplex City, bitch!", which evolved into a popular catchphrase. Midway through the bout, Rollins cashed in his Money in the Bank contract, turning it into a triple threat. Rollins pinned Reigns to win the title. The following night on Raw, Lesnar attempted to invoke his rematch clause but attacked announcers and a cameraman after being denied, leading to a storyline suspension.

Lesnar returned on the June 15 episode of Raw and was named the number one contender for Rollins's title at Battleground on July 19. On July 4, he appeared at WWE's The Beast in the East special in Tokyo, defeating Kofi Kingston. At Battleground, Lesnar appeared poised to win the title before The Undertaker interfered, resulting in a disqualification and continuing their unresolved feud.

==== Suplex City (2015–2016) ====
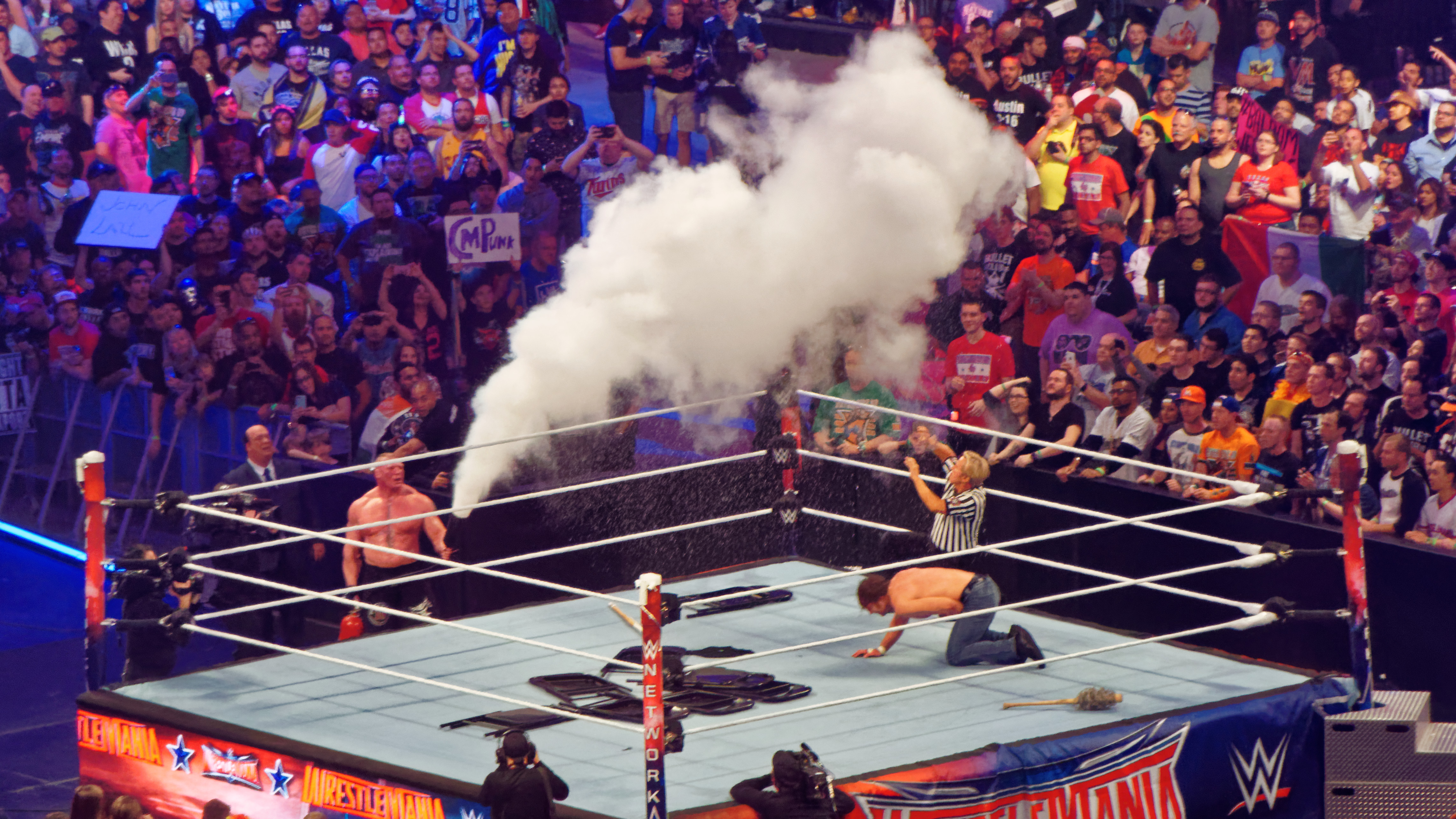
Lesnar and Dean Ambrose during their match at WrestleMania 32

The following night on Raw, The Undertaker explained that he had attacked Lesnar not for ending his WrestleMania streak, but rather for Lesnar allowing Heyman to constantly taunt him about it, which led to the two brawling throughout the arena and a WrestleMania rematch being scheduled for SummerSlam on August 23, where The Undertaker controversially defeated Lesnar. The timekeeper rang the bell as The Undertaker had supposedly submitted to Lesnar's Kimura lock, though the referee had not seen any submission. In the ensuing confusion, The Undertaker hit Lesnar with a low blow and applied his Hell's Gate submission hold, in which Lesnar passed out. The following night on Raw, Lesnar and Heyman challenged The Undertaker to an immediate rematch, only to be confronted by Bo Dallas (who mocked Lesnar about his defeat); Lesnar responded with five German suplexes and an F-5.

At Hell in a Cell on October 25, Lesnar defeated The Undertaker in a Hell in a Cell match after a low blow and F-5 onto the exposed ring floor, ending their feud. The match was later voted "Match of the Year" during the 2015 Slammy Awards.

On the January 11, 2016, episode of Raw, Lesnar returned, attacking The New Day, The League of Nations (Sheamus, King Barrett, Rusev and Alberto Del Rio) and Kevin Owens, before performing an F-5 on Roman Reigns. The following week on Raw, he brawled with Reigns until they were attacked by The Wyatt Family. At the Royal Rumble on January 24, Lesnar was the 23rd entrant, eliminating Jack Swagger and The Wyatt Family minus Bray Wyatt before being eliminated by the Wyatt Family members he had eliminated first. He later defeated Wyatt and Luke Harper in a two-on-one handicap at the Road Block pay-per-view event. At Fastlane on February 21, Lesnar lost a triple threat match for a WWE World Heavyweight Championship opportunity at WrestleMania 32, where Reigns pinned Dean Ambrose. The following night on Raw, Lesnar attacked Ambrose in the parking lot as he was arriving at the arena. A No Holds Barred Street Fight match was set between them at WrestleMania 32 on April 3, which Lesnar won.

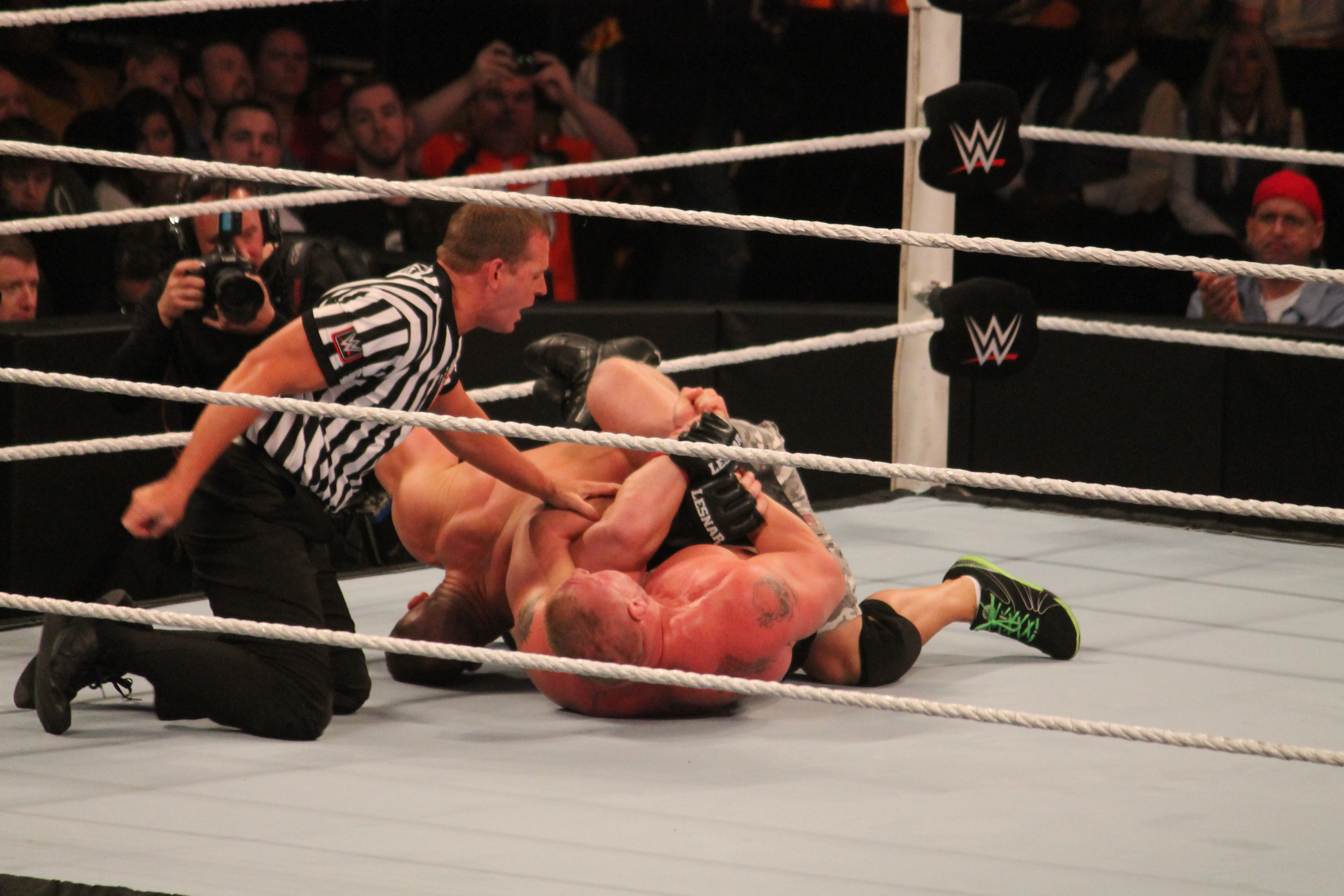
Lesnar performing the Kimura lock on John Cena

During the 2016 WWE draft, Lesnar was drafted to the Raw brand and faced Randy Orton in an interpromotional match at SummerSlam, where Lesnar defeated Orton by technical knockout, leaving Orton with a forehead wound which required ten staples. The end made many people believe Lesnar had gone off script due to the severity of Orton's head wound, out of which Vince McMahon confirmed that the ending was planned.

On the October 10 episode of Raw, Heyman, on Lesnar's behalf, challenged Goldberg to a fight after the pair had been feuding for several months through social media and during promotional work for the WWE 2K17 video game, which featured Lesnar as the cover star and Goldberg as the pre-order bonus. Heyman stated that Goldberg was the one blemish on Lesnar's WWE career, as Goldberg had defeated Lesnar at WrestleMania XX in 2004. On the October 17 episode of Raw, Goldberg returned to WWE after a twelve-year absence and accepted Lesnar's request for a fight with their match later scheduled for Survivor Series. On the final Raw before Survivor Series, Lesnar and Goldberg had a confrontation for the first time in twelve years, resulting in a brawl with security after Heyman insulted Goldberg's family. On November 20 at Survivor Series, Lesnar quickly lost to Goldberg in 1 minute and 26 seconds, marking the first time in three years that Lesnar was pinned.

==== Year-long Universal Championship reign (2017–2018) ====
At the 2017 Royal Rumble match on January 29, Lesnar was quickly eliminated by Goldberg. Following that, he challenged Goldberg to a match at WrestleMania 33. After Goldberg won the WWE Universal Championship at Fastlane on March 5, their bout was made a title match. On April 2 at WrestleMania, Lesnar defeated Goldberg to win the Universal Championship, marking his fifth world title win in WWE.

After several weeks of feuding, Lesnar's first title defense came at the inaugural Great Balls of Fire event on July 9, 2017, where he successfully retained against Samoa Joe, before defeating him a second time for the title at a house show.

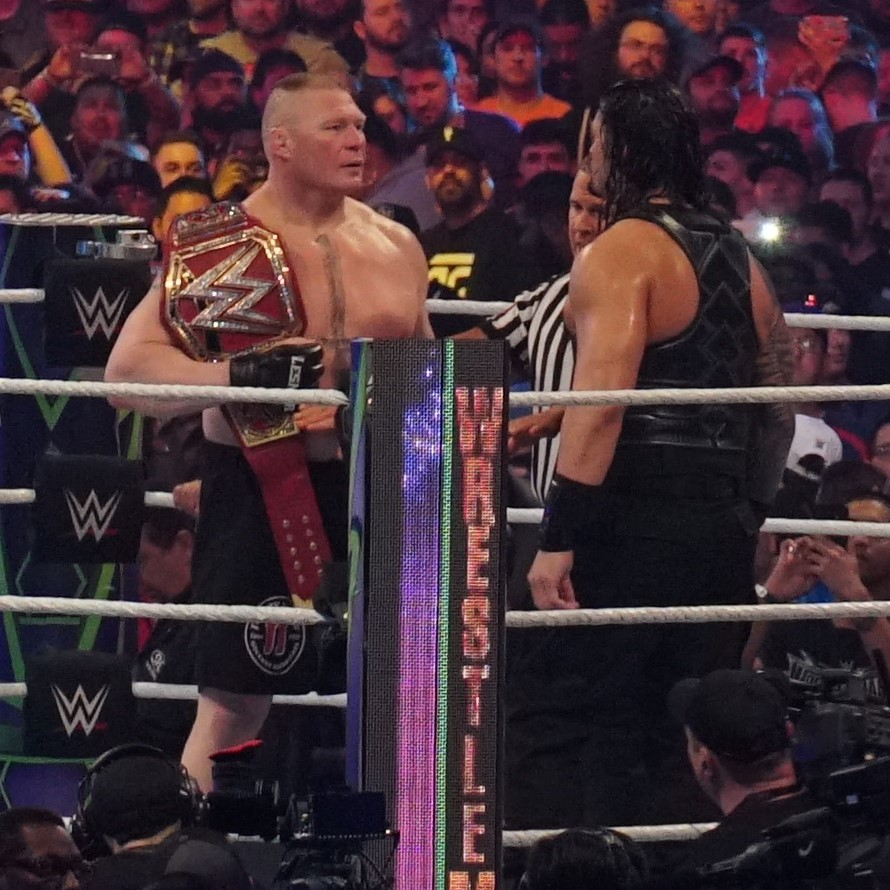
Lesnar facing Roman Reigns before their Universal Championship match at WrestleMania 34

On the July 31 episode of Raw, Lesnar was scheduled to defend his title in a fatal four-way match at SummerSlam against Samoa Joe, Roman Reigns and Braun Strowman. Lesnar and Heyman stated that both would leave WWE should Lesnar lose the championship in the match. At SummerSlam on August 20, Lesnar retained the title by pinning Reigns. The next night on Raw, Lesnar was attacked by Strowman. The subsequent title match at No Mercy on September 24 was won by Lesnar. Lesnar then defeated WWE Champion AJ Styles in an interbrand champion vs. champion non-title match at Survivor Series on November 19. His next title defense was scheduled for the Royal Rumble on January 28, 2018, where he successfully defended the title in a triple threat match against Strowman and Kane. Lesnar then re-ignited his feud with Roman Reigns, who won the Elimination Chamber match at Elimination Chamber on February 25 to become the number one contender to Lesnar's title at WrestleMania 34. At WrestleMania on April 8, Lesnar pinned Reigns to retain the title in the main event. Rumors arose that Lesnar would leave WWE and rejoin the UFC. On April 9, Lesnar re-signed with WWE. At the Greatest Royal Rumble pay-per-view on April 27, he again defeated Reigns in a steel cage when Reigns speared Lesnar through the cage wall. As Lesnar escaped the cage first, he was declared the winner.

After the Greatest Royal Rumble, Lesnar was absent from WWE television for nearly three months. At Extreme Rules on July 15, Raw General Manager Kurt Angle threatened to strip Lesnar of the Universal Championship if he did not show up to Raw the following night. The following night on Raw, Heyman agreed that Lesnar would defend his title at SummerSlam; Reigns became the number one contender later that same night. On the July 30 episode of Raw, Lesnar was at the arena but refused to appear in the ring. Angle threatened to fire Heyman if he could not persuade Lesnar to come to the ring. Throughout the broadcast, Heyman's attempts were unsuccessful. At the end of the show, after Angle had fired him, Lesnar appeared to attack Angle and choke Heyman. Two weeks later, the dissension between Lesnar and Heyman was revealed to be just a ruse when Lesnar returning on the August 13 episode of Raw to attack Reigns. At SummerSlam on August 19, Strowman was at ringside ready to cash in his Money in the Bank contract on the winner. Lesnar incapacitated Strowman, allowing Reigns to capitalize on the distracted Lesnar and win the Universal Championship, ending Lesnar's title reign at 504 days. As of 2018, the reign was the sixth-longest world championship reign in WWE history and the longest since 1988.

==== World championship reigns and first retirement (2018–2020) ====
Lesnar returned at Hell in a Cell on September 16, interrupting the Hell in a Cell match between defending Universal Champion Reigns and Braun Strowman, kicking in the door and attacking both men, thus rendering the match a no-contest and costing Strowman his Money in the Bank cash-in match. The next night on Raw, Acting General Manager Baron Corbin scheduled Reigns to defend the Universal Championship in a triple threat match against Lesnar and Strowman at Crown Jewel on November 2. After Reigns relinquished the title due to a legitimate leukemia relapse, the match was changed to a singles match between Lesnar and Strowman for the vacant title. At Crown Jewel, Lesnar defeated Strowman in three minutes to become the first two-time Universal Champion, thanks to a pre-match attack from Corbin.

After his title win, Lesnar was scheduled to face WWE Champion AJ Styles at Survivor Series in another champion vs. champion non-title match. Five days before, Styles lost the WWE Championship to Daniel Bryan on SmackDown. At Survivor Series on November 18, Lesnar overcame a late rally from Bryan to defeat him. Lesnar then successfully defended the title against Finn Bálor via submission at the Royal Rumble on January 27, 2019. The next night on Raw, Lesnar attacked 2019 Royal Rumble match winner Seth Rollins with six F-5s, setting up a title match for WrestleMania 35. At WrestleMania on April 7, Lesnar attacked Rollins before the match. Rollins then attacked Lesnar with a low blow while the referee was down and pinned Lesnar, ending his second reign as Universal Champion at 156 days.

Lesnar won the Money in the Bank ladder match at the namesake event on May 19, which he entered as a surprise participant towards the end of the match. After failing an attempt to cash-in on Rollins at Super ShowDown on June 7, Lesnar successfully cashed in his contract to win the Universal Championship from Rollins at Extreme Rules on July 14. At SummerSlam on August 11, Lesnar lost the title back to Rollins, ending his third title reign at 28 days.

Lesnar and Heyman returned on the September 17 episode of SmackDown to challenge Kofi Kingston for the WWE Championship. Kingston accepted and Lesnar proceeded to F-5 him. On SmackDown's 20th Anniversary on October 4, Lesnar quickly defeated Kingston in about eight seconds to win his fifth WWE Championship; this was Lesnar's first match on SmackDown in 15 years. After his victory, Lesnar was attacked by former UFC opponent Cain Velasquez, making his WWE debut. Lesnar was then scheduled to defend the WWE Championship against Velasquez at Crown Jewel on October 31. During the 2019 draft, Lesnar was drafted to SmackDown. At the Crown Jewel event, Lesnar defeated Velasquez in under five minutes via submission with the Kimura Lock. After the match, Rey Mysterio attacked Lesnar with a chair. On the November 1 episode of SmackDown, Lesnar and Heyman quit the brand in order to go after Mysterio, who had been drafted to Raw, thus transferring to Raw with the WWE Championship. This led to Mysterio challenging Lesnar for the WWE Championship at Survivor Series on November 24, which was made official as a No Holds Barred match, where Lesnar retained, despite Mysterio's son, Dominik's attempt to aid Mysterio during the match.

Lesnar returned on the January 6, 2020, episode of Raw to declare that no one deserved an opportunity at the WWE Championship at the Royal Rumble, so instead he would enter the Royal Rumble match as entrant number one. At the Royal Rumble on January 26, Lesnar eliminated the first thirteen competitors he faced, tying the record for most eliminations in a Royal Rumble match, before being eliminated by Drew McIntyre, who won the match. After retaining the championship against Ricochet at Super ShowDown on February 27, Lesnar ultimately lost the WWE Championship to McIntyre in the main event of WrestleMania 36 Part 2 (which was taped on March 25–26 and aired on April 5). This was his final appearance until 2021 – it was later reported by several sources that Lesnar was not under contract with WWE after the match. Lesnar confirmed in March 2022 that he had initially retired from professional wrestling after WrestleMania 36, until deciding to return in 2021.

=== Second return to WWE (2021–2026) ===
==== Various feuds and world championship reigns (2021–2023) ====
Lesnar, now sporting a cowboy/farmer look with a beard and ponytail, returned as a face at SummerSlam and faced Reigns for the WWE Universal Championship at Crown Jewel, which Lesnar lost. On the December 3 episode of SmackDown, it was announced that Lesnar would once again face Reigns for the title, this time at the Day 1 event, but the match was canceled after Reigns contracted COVID-19, and Lesnar was instead added to Raw's WWE Championship match at the event, winning the title.

His title reign ended 29 days later at Royal Rumble, losing it to Lashley. However, Lesnar won the Royal Rumble match. Lesnar regained the WWE Championship at Elimination Chamber and challenged Reigns for the Universal Championship at WrestleMania 38 in a title unification Winner Takes All match. Lesnar lost the match at the event. On the June 17 episode of SmackDown, Lesnar once again returned, renewing his rivalry with Reigns. Lesnar faced Reigns in a Last Man Standing match for the title at SummerSlam, where Lesnar failed to beat Reigns for the title, ending their feud.

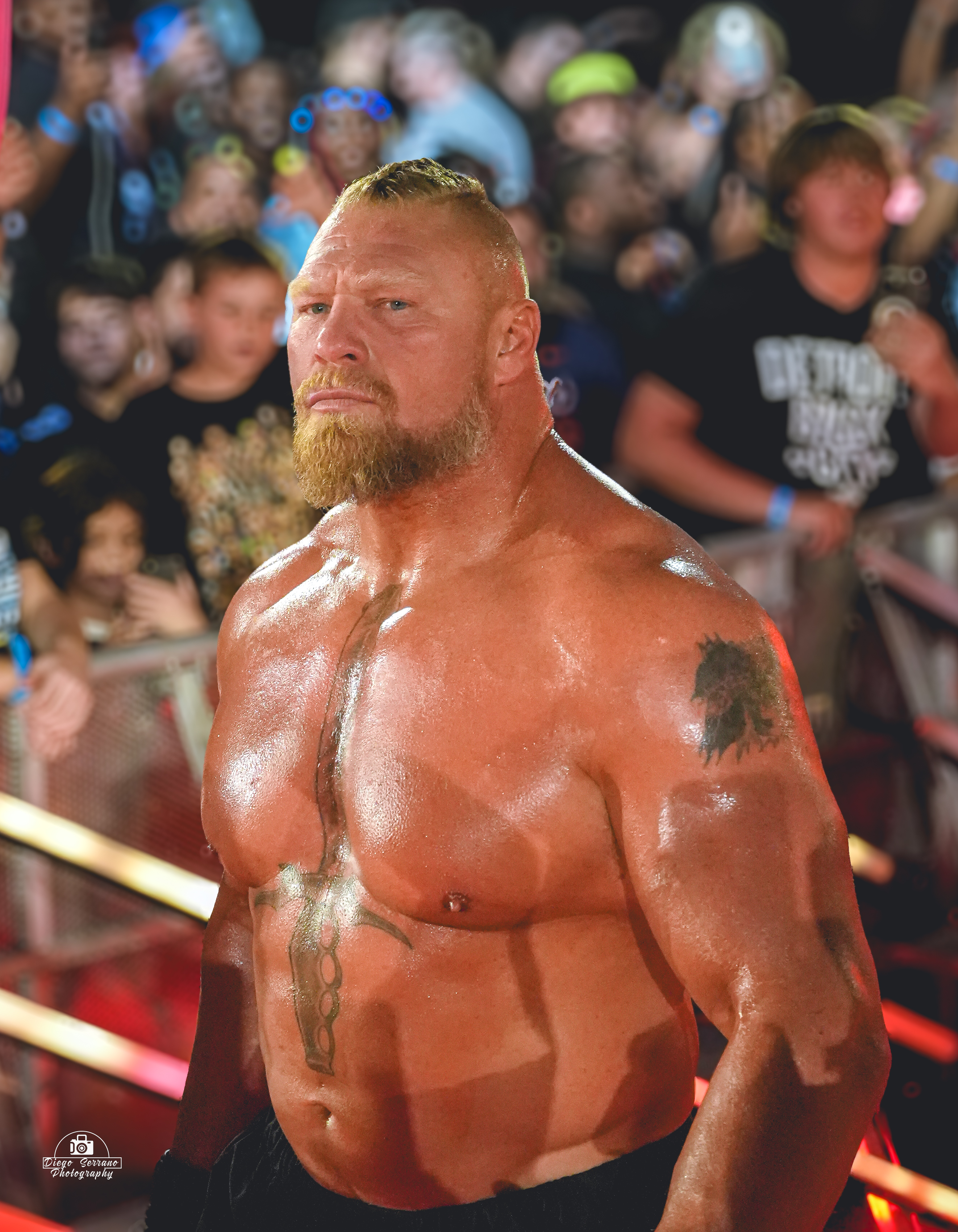
Lesnar at SummerSlam in 2023

After Lesnar returned in October 2022, he feuded with Bobby Lashley. Lesnar defeated Lashley at Crown Jewel, and caused Lashley to lose his United States Championship on Raw Is XXX. At Elimination Chamber on February 18, Lesnar lost to Lashley by disqualification after he hit Lashley with a low blow and attacked both the referee and Lashley, ending their feud. At WrestleMania 39, he defeated Omos. After WrestleMania, Lesnar turned heel and feuded with Cody Rhodes. Lesnar would lose against Rhodes at Backlash, defeated Rhodes at Night of Champions by submission, and lost to Rhodes again at SummerSlam to end their feud.

==== Vince McMahon scandal and hiatus (2024–2025) ====
According to several reports, Lesnar was scheduled to make his return to WWE at the 2024 Royal Rumble event as a participant in the Royal Rumble match. During the match, he would have been eliminated by Dominik Mysterio, as part of the build to a match against Mysterio at Elimination Chamber: Perth. However, a lawsuit was filed a few days before the Royal Rumble by Janel Grant, a former employee at WWE global headquarters between 2019 and 2022. Grant alleged that WWE co-founder Vince McMahon had coerced her into a sexual relationship with WWE executive John Laurinaitis and an unnamed WWE wrestler "who was also a former UFC fighter" . The unnamed talent was identified by The Wall Street Journal as Lesnar; Grant explicitly named Lesnar as the UFC/WWE talent in question when she amended her complaint in January 2025. As a result of the lawsuit, he was removed from the Royal Rumble and replaced by Bron Breakker. It was later reported that he was removed from WWE's creative plans ahead of their WrestleMania XL event, despite originally being planned to have a match against WWE Intercontinental Champion Gunther at the event. In February, he was removed from the WWE SuperCard video game. He would also be removed from the cover of WWE 2K24's "40 Years of WrestleMania" edition, as well as the playable roster, only being accessible through the game's Showcase Mode. He was also removed from the introduction video of WWE's weekly programming, with LA Knight replacing him.

==== Feud with Oba Femi, and second retirement (2025–2026) ====
After a two-year absence, on the second night of SummerSlam on August 3, 2025, and despite the Grant lawsuit remaining active, Lesnar made a surprise return after the main event, attacking John Cena with an F-5, following Cena's loss to Cody Rhodes. In his return match, he would defeat Cena at Wrestlepalooza on September 20. At Survivor Series: WarGames on November 29, he would ally himself once again with Paul Heyman, teaming with The Vision (Bron Breakker and Bronson Reed), Logan Paul and Drew McIntyre to defeat Roman Reigns, Undisputed WWE Champion Cody Rhodes, World Heavyweight Champion CM Punk and The Usos (Jey Uso and Jimmy Uso) in a WarGames match.

At the Royal Rumble on January 31, 2026, Lesnar entered the match at #22, eliminating multiple competitors before being eliminated by Rhodes and LA Knight. On the February 23 episode of Raw, Lesnar issued an open challenge for a match against him at WrestleMania 42, which was later accepted by Oba Femi. At WrestleMania 42 on April 19, Lesnar was defeated by Femi. After the match, Lesnar left his gloves and boots in the ring before embracing Paul Heyman and bidding farewell to the fans, leaving both fans and media to speculate that he had retired from professional wrestling. On May 7, 2026, Lesnar's profile was moved from the superstar section to the alumni section on WWE.com. Lesnar returned and attacked Femi on the May 18 episode of Raw, revealing his retirement to be a ruse. At Clash in Italy on May 31, Lesnar defeated Femi in a WrestleMania rematch. On the June 29 episode of Raw, Lesnar returned accepting Femi's challenge for SummerSlam to be contested inside Hell in a Cell. At SummerSlam on Night 1 on August 1, Lesnar lost to Femi ending their feud. After the match, Lesnar showed respect to Femi and declared him "the future of WWE". On August 3, Lesnar was moved to the alumni section on WWE's website, and then on The Pat McAfee Show the next day, Lesnar confirmed that he was retired, thus SummerSlam was officially his retirement match.

== Professional wrestling style and persona ==
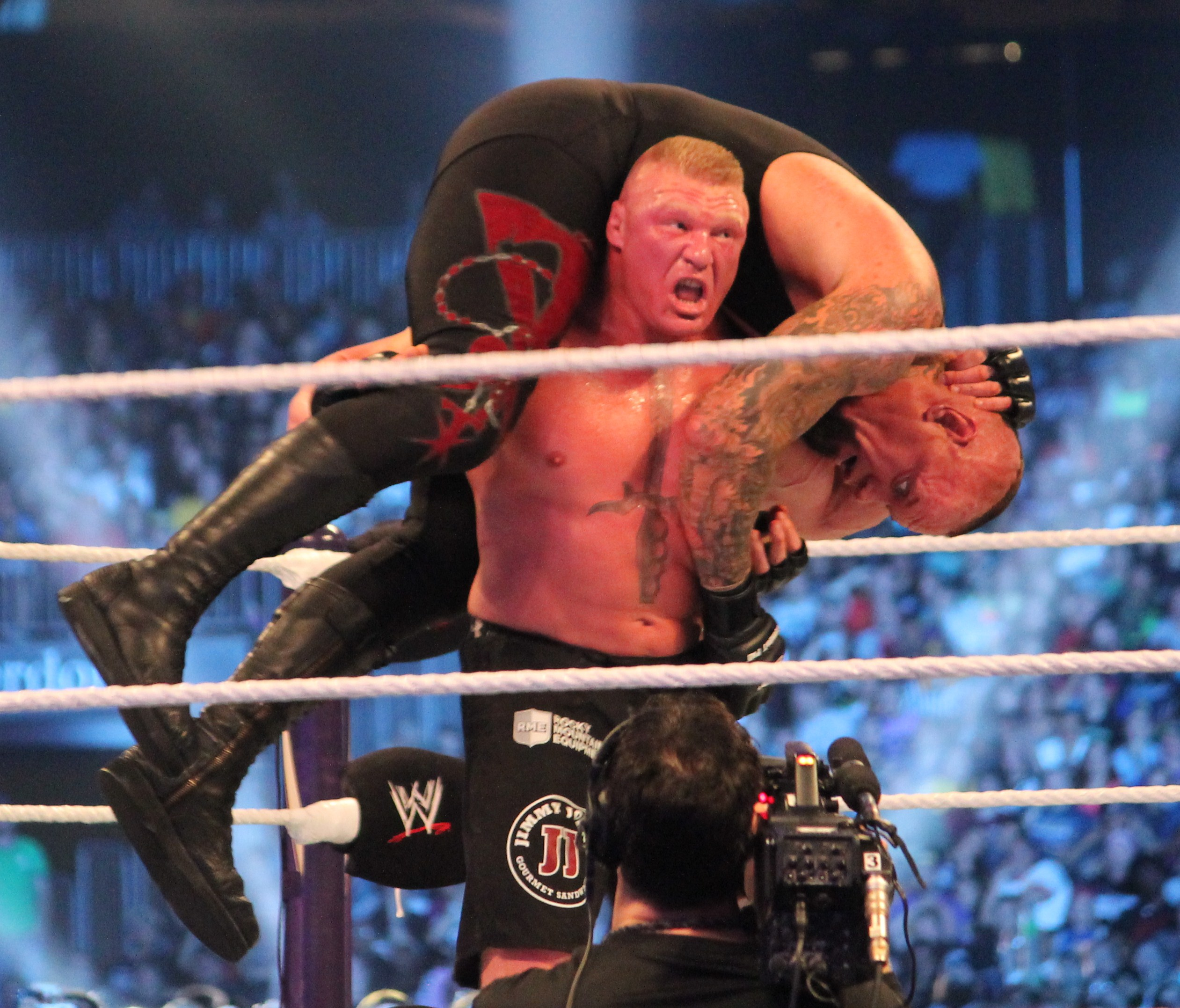
Lesnar preparing the F-5 against The Undertaker

Since Lesnar's debut, he was portrayed as a powerhouse athlete. He is often called by his nickname "The Beast Incarnate" or simply "The Beast". During his initial run when he was consistently main-eventing, WWE was in what is labeled by the company and fans as the "Ruthless Aggression Era". His go-to finishing maneuver for his entire career has been a fireman's carry facebuster known as the F-5 (or The Verdict when he wrestled outside of WWE). After his return in 2012, Lesnar focused on an MMA-oriented gimmick, sporting MMA gloves during his matches and adding the Kimura lock as a submission hold. Lesnar is also known for performing several suplexes (especially German suplexes) on his rivals, with these often being described as the opponent being taken to "Suplex City", named after an ad-lib Lesnar delivered to Roman Reigns during their WrestleMania 31 match. Lesnar has been managed by Paul Heyman for the majority of his WWE career with Heyman being Lesnar's mouthpiece for storylines and feuds.

Throughout the second half of the 2010s, Lesnar began to receive an increasing amount of criticism for his character and performances. Many reporters thought his Suplex City character "jumped the shark" and his matches had "become formulaic". He was largely criticized due to his absences from television during his time as Universal Champion despite being on a part-time contract. It was pointed out that he had the longest world championship reign since Hulk Hogan at the time, but only defended the title 13 times, all on pay-per-views, with Tim Fiorvanti from ESPN commenting that he had "removed the top title on Monday Night Raw from circulation". The short length of his matches was also criticized by journalists and fans. Former WWE Champion Bob Backlund criticized the fact that Lesnar used mostly suplexes during his matches, saying "it gets old to do the same thing over and over and over again".

== Professional football career ==
Brock Lesnar
No. 69
- Position: Defensive tackle

Personal information
- Listed height: 6 ft 3 in (1.91 m)
- Listed weight: 281 lb (127 kg)

Career information
- High school: Webster
- College: Minnesota
- NFL draft: 2004: undrafted

Career history
- Minnesota Vikings (2004)*
- * Offseason or practice squad member only

After his match at WrestleMania XX, Lesnar sidelined his career in WWE to pursue a career in the National Football League (NFL) despite not playing American football since high school. The WWE issued this statement on their official website, WWE.com, following his departure:

Brock Lesnar has made a personal decision to put his WWE career on hold to prepare to tryout for the National Football League this season. Brock has wrestled his entire professional career in the WWE and we are proud of his accomplishments and wish him the best in his new endeavor.

Lesnar later told a Minnesota radio show that he had "three wonderful years" in WWE, but had grown unhappy and always wanted to play pro football, adding that he did not want to be 40 years old and wondering if he could have "made it" in football. In an interview about the NFL, he stated:

This is no load of bull; it's no WWE stunt. I am dead serious about this. I ain't afraid of anything and I ain't afraid of anybody. I've been an underdog in athletics since I was five. I got zero college offers for wrestling. Now people say I can't play football, that it's a joke. I say I can. I'm as good an athlete as a lot of guys in the NFL, if not better. I've always had to fight for everything. I wasn't the best technician in amateur wrestling but I was strong, had great conditioning, and a hard head. Nobody could break me. As long as I have that, I don't give a damn what anybody else thinks.

Lesnar had a great showing at the NFL Combine. On April 17, 2004, a minivan collided with his motorbike; he suffered a broken jaw and left hand, a bruised pelvis, and a pulled groin. Several NFL teams expressed interest in watching Lesnar work out. The Minnesota Vikings worked out Lesnar on June 11, 2004, but he was hampered by the groin injury suffered in the April motorcycle accident. On July 24 it was reported that he was nearly recovered from his groin injury. He signed with the Vikings on July 27 and played in several preseason games as a defensive tackle. He was released by the Vikings on August 30, 2004. Lesnar received an invitation to play as a representative for the Vikings in NFL Europe but declined due to his desire to stay in the United States with his family. He had several official football cards produced of him during his time with the Vikings.

== Mixed martial arts career ==
=== Hero's (2007) ===
On April 29, 2006, after the final match of the K-1 World Grand Prix 2006 in Las Vegas, Lesnar stated his intent to join K-1's mixed martial arts league, Hero's. He trained with Minnesota Martial Arts Academy under Greg Nelson and Minnesota assistant head wrestling coach Marty Morgan. Lesnar signed the deal in August. His first fight was scheduled against Hong-man Choi of South Korea on June 2, 2007, at the Dynamite!! USA show. Prior to the match, Choi was replaced by Min-soo Kim. Lesnar submitted Kim with strikes in 1:09 of the first round to win his first official MMA match.

=== Ultimate Fighting Championship (2008–2011) ===
==== Debut and UFC Heavyweight Champion ====
During UFC 77 on October 20, Lesnar joined Ultimate Fighting Championship with a one-fight contract. On February 2, 2008, Lesnar made his debut with the promotion at UFC 81 against former UFC Heavyweight Champion Frank Mir. Due to his large hands, Lesnar was wearing 4XL gloves for the fight, making him the second man in Nevada's combat sports history to wear such gloves, after Hong-man Choi. Lesnar secured an early takedown and began landing numerous punches, but was docked a point, after a punch hit Mir on the back of the head. He scored another takedown and continued landing ground and pound, before Mir secured a kneebar and forced a submission at 1:30 of the first round.

Despite losing on his debut, he was offered a new contract and at UFC 82 on March 1, former UFC Heavyweight Champion and Hall of Famer Mark Coleman was announced to fight Lesnar at UFC 87. Coleman withdrew from the fight due to an injury and was replaced by Heath Herring. In the first round Lesnar scored an early knockdown and went on to dominate the fight winning via unanimous decision by 30–26 on all three judges' scorecards.

Lesnar then faced Randy Couture for the UFC Heavyweight Championship at UFC 91 on November 15. He denied Couture's takedown attempts and outstruck him on the feet, eventually knocking him down and landing ground and pound until he was awarded the technical knockout and UFC Heavyweight Championship. Lesnar's win made him the first world champion in both professional wrestling and MMA.

On December 27 at UFC 92, Mir defeated Antônio Nogueira for the Interim Heavyweight Championship and was to face Lesnar for the Undisputed UFC Heavyweight Championship at UFC 98. Immediately after winning the Interim Heavyweight title, Mir found Lesnar in the crowd and shouted, "You've got my belt". Due to a knee injury to Mir, the title unification match with Lesnar that was originally slated to be the UFC 98 main event was postponed. Lesnar instead fought Mir at UFC 100 on July 11, 2009. Mir attempted to grab ahold of Lesnar's leg early in the fight but was denied and Lesnar held top position landing punches for the rest of the round. In the second round, the two traded blows but Mir hurt Lesnar with a knee and a punch, leading him to take Mir down and land heavy ground and pound winning the fight via technical knockout. During his post-match celebration, Lesnar flipped off the crowd who had been booing him. Lesnar also made a disparaging comment about the pay-per-view's primary sponsor Bud Light, claiming they "won't pay me nothin'" and promoted Coors Light instead. Lesnar later apologized for his remarks at the post-fight press conference, where he held a bottle of Bud Light and endorsed their product.

On July 1, it was reported that the winner of the Shane Carwin vs. Cain Velasquez fight at UFC 104 would face Lesnar, but the match was scrapped and Lesnar was scheduled to defend the title against Carwin at UFC 106 on November 21. On October 2, Lesnar pulled out of his Carwin bout due to an illness. UFC President Dana White said Lesnar had been ill for three weeks, claiming he had never been this sick in his life and that it would take him a while to recover, therefore his fight with Carwin was rescheduled for UFC 108 on January 2, 2010. Lesnar initially sought treatment in Canada, but later told reporters that he had received "Third World treatment" at a hospital in Brandon, Manitoba and that seeking better treatment in the United States saved his life. Lesnar went on to criticize Canadian health care further and stated that he shared his experience to speak "on the behalf of the doctors in the United States that don't want health care reform to happen".

On November 4, it was confirmed that Lesnar had mononucleosis and that his bout with Carwin would have to wait a bit longer and the fight for Lesnar's heavyweight championship was canceled. On November 14 at the UFC 105 post-fight conference, White stated, "[Lesnar]'s not well and he's not going to be getting well anytime soon" and that an interim title match might need to be set up. In addition to mononucleosis, it was revealed that he had developed a serious case of diverticulitis, an intestinal disorder, which required surgery. After further diagnosis, Lesnar underwent surgery on November 16 to close a perforation in his intestine that had been leaking fecal matter into his abdomen, causing pain, abscesses and overtaxing his immune system to the point that he contracted mononucleosis. From the level of damage to Lesnar's system, the surgeon estimated that the intestinal condition had been ongoing for around a year.

In January 2010, Lesnar revealed on ESPN's SportsCenter that he was scheduled to make a return to the UFC in the summer. A match between Mir and Carwin took place on March 27 at UFC 111 to determine the Interim Heavyweight Champion and Lesnar's next opponent. Carwin defeated Mir via knockout in the first round, becoming the new Interim Champion. After the fight, Lesnar came into the ring and stated, "It was a good fight but he's wearing a belt that's a make-believe belt. I've got the real championship belt". Lesnar faced Carwin at UFC 116 on July 3, to unify the heavyweight titles. Early in the first round, Carwin knocked Lesnar down with heavy punches, and continued landing ground and pound throughout the round, opening a cut on Lesnar's eye. In the next round, Carwin was noticeably fatigued and Lesnar scored a takedown, attained full mount, then move into side-control and finish the fight with an arm-triangle choke. With the victory, Lesnar became the undisputed UFC Heavyweight Champion, earning his first Submission of the Night and giving Carwin his first loss. The win also tied a UFC record for most consecutive successful UFC Heavyweight Championship defenses.

==== Title loss and first retirement ====
Lesnar's next defense was against undefeated top contender Cain Velasquez on October 23 at the Honda Center in Anaheim, California at UFC 121. Dana White announced via SportsNation that the UFC would bring back UFC Primetime to hype the fight. In the first round, Lesnar scored a takedown and land some heavy knees but eventually succumbed to Velasquez's superior striking and was finished by technical knockout late in the round.

Lesnar was advertised as a coach of The Ultimate Fighter Season 13, opposite Junior dos Santos, with the two expected to fight on June 11 at UFC 131, but he was struck with another bout of diverticulitis and had to withdraw from the fight on May 12. He was replaced by Shane Carwin, who ended up losing against dos Santos. Lesnar underwent surgery on May 27 to help battle his problems with diverticulitis. White said that he had a 12-inch piece of his colon removed.

In its May 2011 issue, ESPN's magazine published a story listing the highest-paid athlete based on base salary and earnings for the most recent calendar year or most recent season in 30 sports. Lesnar topped the list for MMA at $5.3 million, which included his reported bout salaries and estimated pay-per-view bonuses.

In the summer of 2011, Lesnar announced that he was returning to action, stating, "I feel like a new man. Healthy. Strong. I feel like I used to feel". His return match was scheduled to be at UFC 141 on December 30 in Las Vegas against former Strikeforce heavyweight champion Alistair Overeem. Lesnar attempted to takedown Overeem but was unable and ate heavy body shots to his surgically repaired stomach, eventually being finished with a liver kick and punches. Lesnar then retired from MMA, mentioning his struggles with diverticulitis and saying "tonight was the last time you'll see me in the octagon".

Speculation about a return to MMA lasted until March 24, 2015, when Lesnar revealed in an interview on SportsCenter that he had re-signed with WWE and officially closed the door on a return to MMA, even though he was offered a deal "ten times more" than what he had made previously in his MMA career. He further elaborated that, while he was training for months for a return to the UFC, he felt "physically great but something was lacking mentally". Lesnar added that "[he's] an older caveman now, so [he] makes smarter caveman decisions" and that he chose to sign with WWE instead of returning to MMA because he could "work part-time with full-time pay".

=== Return to the UFC (2016–2018) ===
==== Fight against Mark Hunt ====
Though Lesnar said he was "closing the door on MMA" in March 2015, UFC announced on June 4, 2016, that he would return at UFC 200 on July 9. WWE confirmed it had granted Lesnar "a one-off opportunity" to compete at UFC 200 before he returned to the company for SummerSlam on August 21. Lesnar dominated the first and third rounds, battering Hunt with ground and pound in the third to secure the unanimous decision win. He also was paid a UFC record $2.5 million purse. This record was broken at UFC 202 by Conor McGregor, who was also the previous holder.

==== Suspension and second retirement ====
On July 15, 2016, Lesnar was notified of a potential anti-doping policy violation by the United States Anti-Doping Agency (USADA) stemming from an undisclosed banned substance in an out-of-competition sample collected on June 28. On July 19, a second test sample taken in-competition on July 9 was revealed as positive for the same banned substance discovered in the previous out-of-competition sample. On August 23, the Nevada State Athletic Commission (NSAC) confirmed that Lesnar had twice been tested positive for clomiphene and was suspended.

On December 15, it was confirmed that Lesnar was fined $250,000 and suspended from competition for one year by the NSAC. He would be eligible to return in July 2017. As a result of the suspension, the result of his fight with Mark Hunt was overturned to a no contest. As of January 2019, Lesnar has yet to pay the fine.

On February 14, 2017, it was reported that Lesnar had notified UFC he was retiring from MMA for the second time. On July 7, 2018, Lesnar stormed the cage after the main event fight at UFC 226 and challenged the new UFC Heavyweight Champion, Daniel Cormier. On July 8, USADA confirmed that Lesnar had begun the process to get back into their drug-testing pool. UFC officials were reportedly targeting a bout between Lesnar and Cormier for the UFC Heavyweight Championship, but Dana White claimed Lesnar told him he was "done" with MMA and the bout ultimately did not occur.

In September 2020, White said he could organize a fight between Lesnar and Jon Jones if both men wanted it. That same month, Bellator president Scott Coker expressed interest in booking Lesnar to fight Fedor Emelianenko. Lesnar did not respond to either man's comments, and once again confirmed in March 2022 that he would stay retired.

== Other media ==
In 2003, WWE Home Video released a DVD chronicling Lesnar's career entitled Brock Lesnar: Here Comes the Pain. It was re-released in 2012 as a three-disc DVD and two-disc Blu-ray collector's edition to tie in with Lesnar's WWE return. It was also expanded to include new matches and interviews. In 2016, a new home video was released on DVD and Blu-ray, as well as a collector's edition, called Brock Lesnar: Eat. Sleep. Conquer. Repeat. and includes accomplishments from his second run in WWE.

Lesnar was featured on the covers of Flex and Muscle & Fitness magazine in 2004 and Minneapolis' City Pages in 2008. He is the cover athlete for the WWE SmackDown! Here Comes the Pain, UFC Undisputed 2010 and WWE 2K17 video games.

In 2009, Lesnar signed an endorsement deal with Dymatize Nutrition. A CD containing footage of Lesnar training was included with Dymatize's "Xpand" product.

Lesnar co-wrote an autobiography with Paul Heyman, titled Death Clutch: My Story of Determination, Domination, and Survival, which was published by William Morrow and Company in 2011.

In a 2013 post on his blog, Attack on Titan author Hajime Isayama revealed that he drew inspiration from Lesnar for the character of the Armored Titan.

== Personal life ==
"It's very basic for me. When I go home, I don't buy into any of the bullshit. Like I said, it's pretty basic: Train, sleep, family, fight. It's my life. I like it. [...] I just don't put myself out there to the fans and prostitute my private life to everybody. In today's day and age, with the Internet and cameras and cell phones, I just like being old school and living in the woods and living my life. I came from nothing, and at any moment, you can go back to having nothing."

— Lesnar on his private life, 2010

Lesnar married fellow WWE performer Rena Greek, better known as Sable, on May 6, 2006. They relocated in 2014 to Canada, where they reside on a farm in Maryfield, Saskatchewan. Together, they have two sons named Turk (born 2009) and Duke (born 2010), both of whom play ice hockey. With his former fiancée, Nicole McClain, Lesnar also has twins who were born in 2002: a daughter named Mya Lynn, who competes in track and field, and a son named Luke, who also plays ice hockey. He is also the stepfather of Greek's daughter with her first husband.

Lesnar is an intensely private individual who has expressed his disdain for the media; he rarely participates in interviews and avoids questions pertaining to his private life. He is a supporter of the Republican Party and a member of the National Rifle Association of America (NRA). He made an appearance at the NRA's annual meeting in May 2011 to discuss his passion for hunting and his role as a spokesman for the Fusion Ammunition company. He is a fan of the Winnipeg Jets ice hockey team and the Saskatchewan Roughriders Canadian football team. In 2016, Lesnar acquired Canadian citizenship, after representing the country in his latter UFC matches.

Lesnar developed addictions to alcohol and painkillers during his first run in WWE, later claiming that he would drink a bottle of vodka per day and take hundreds of Vicodin pills per month to manage the pain caused by wear and tear on his body. He cited the incident in which he botched a shooting star press at WrestleMania XIX and landed on the top of his head as a primary source of pain. As a result of the addiction and mental exhaustion, he says that he cannot remember the entire two years that made up his first WWE tenure.

== Legal issues ==
In January 2001, Lesnar was arrested in Louisville, Kentucky, for suspicion of possessing large amounts of illegal substances. The charges were dropped when it was discovered that the substances were legal hormones. His lawyer described it as a "vitamin type of thing".

Lesnar had previously signed a non-compete clause in order to be released from his contract with WWE, which prohibited him from working for any other professional wrestling companies before June 2010. He challenged this ruling in court. WWE responded with a counterclaim after Lesnar breached the agreement by appearing at a New Japan Pro-Wrestling show in 2004. In July 2005, the two sides dropped their claims and entered negotiations to renew their relationship. WWE had offered Lesnar a contract, but on August 2, their official website reported that Lesnar had withdrawn from any involvement with the company. The lawsuit began to enter settlement talks on September 21, but did not get solved.

On January 14, 2006, Judge Christopher Droney stated that unless WWE gave him a good argument between then and the 25th, he would rule in favor of Lesnar, giving him a summary judgment. This would have enabled Lesnar to work anywhere immediately. WWE was later granted a deadline postponement. On April 24, both parties reached a settlement. On June 12, a federal judge dismissed the case at the request of both legal parties.

On December 15, 2011, Lesnar was charged with hunting infractions on a trip to Alberta on November 19, 2010. Two charges were dropped, but Lesnar pleaded guilty to the charge of improper tagging of an animal. He was fined $1,725 and given a six-month hunting suspension.

== Filmography ==
Film
Year	Title	Role	Notes
2014	True Giants	Himself	Film debut
2014	Foxcatcher	Wrestler	Cameo; Uncredited
2016	Countdown	Himself	Uncredited

Television
Year	Title	Role	Notes
2008	E:60	Himself	October 21
2009–2010	Rome Is Burning	Himself	3 episodes
2010	UFC Primetime	Himself	Episode: Lesnar vs. Velasquez
2011	ESPN Friday Night Fights	Himself	January 14
2011	Late Night with Jimmy Fallon	Himself	March 28 (season 3, episode 49)
2012	The Tonight Show with Jay Leno	Himself	February 21 (season 20, episode 93)
2016	Mike & Mike	Himself	August 18
2016	SportsCenter	Himself	February 16 (season 38, episode 47)
2016	UFC Ultimate Insider	Himself	July 3 (Season 5, Episode 520)

== Video games ==
WWE video games
Year	Title	Notes
2002	WWE SmackDown! Shut Your Mouth	Video game debut Cover athlete (NTSC version)
2003	WWE Crush Hour	
2003	WWE WrestleMania XIX	
2003	WWE Raw 2	
2003	WWE SmackDown! Here Comes the Pain	Cover athlete
2011	WWE '12	
2012	WWE '13	
2013	WWE 2K14	
2014	WWE 2K15	
2015	WWE 2K16	
2016	WWE 2K17	Cover athlete
2017	WWE 2K18	
2018	WWE 2K19	
2019	WWE 2K20	
2020	WWE 2K Battlegrounds	
2022	WWE 2K22	
2023	WWE 2K23	
2024	WWE 2K24	WrestleMania Showcase only
2025	WWE 2K25	DLC
2026	WWE 2K26	

Madden NFL Video games
Year	Title	Notes
2005	Madden NFL 06	First appearance in a non-wrestling video game, appears as a defensive tackle free agent with a 69 overall rating

UFC Video games
Year	Title	Notes
2009	UFC 2009 Undisputed	
2010	UFC Undisputed 2010	Cover athlete
2012	UFC Undisputed 3	
2014	EA Sports UFC	DLC
2020	EA Sports UFC 4	DLC

== Mixed martial arts record ==
Professional record breakdown
9 matches	5 wins	3 losses
By knockout	3	2
By submission	1	1
By decision	1	0
No contests	1	

Res.	Record	Opponent	Method	Event	Date	Round	Time	Location	Notes
NC	5–3 (1)	Mark Hunt	NC (overturned)	UFC 200	July 9, 2016	3	5:00	Las Vegas, Nevada, United States	Originally a unanimous decision win for Lesnar; overturned after he tested positive for clomiphene.
Loss	5–3	Alistair Overeem	TKO (kick to the body and punches)	UFC 141	December 30, 2011	1	2:26	Las Vegas, Nevada, United States	
Loss	5–2	Cain Velasquez	TKO (punches)	UFC 121	October 23, 2010	1	4:12	Anaheim, California, United States	Lost the UFC Heavyweight Championship.
Win	5–1	Shane Carwin	Submission (arm-triangle choke)	UFC 116	July 3, 2010	2	2:19	Las Vegas, Nevada, United States	Defended and unified the UFC Heavyweight Championship. Submission of the Night.
Win	4–1	Frank Mir	TKO (punches)	UFC 100	July 11, 2009	2	1:48	Las Vegas, Nevada, United States	Defended and unified the UFC Heavyweight Championship.
Win	3–1	Randy Couture	TKO (punches)	UFC 91	November 15, 2008	2	3:07	Las Vegas, Nevada, United States	Won the UFC Heavyweight Championship.
Win	2–1	Heath Herring	Decision (unanimous)	UFC 87	August 9, 2008	3	5:00	Minneapolis, Minnesota, United States	
Loss	1–1	Frank Mir	Submission (kneebar)	UFC 81	February 2, 2008	1	1:30	Las Vegas, Nevada, United States	Lesnar was deducted one point due to landing a blow to the back of Mir's head.
Win	1–0	Kim Min-soo	TKO (submission to punches)	Dynamite!! USA	June 2, 2007	1	1:09	Los Angeles, California, United States	

== Pay-per-view bouts ==
=== Mixed martial arts ===
No.	Event	Fight	Date	Venue	City	PPV buys
1.	Dynamite!! USA	Lesnar vs. Min-soo	June 2, 2007	Los Angeles Memorial Coliseum	Los Angeles, California, U.S.	35,000
2.	UFC 81	Mir vs. Lesnar (co)	February 2, 2008	Mandalay Bay Events Center	Las Vegas, Nevada, U.S.	650,000
3.	UFC 87	Lesnar vs. Herring (co)	August 9, 2008	Target Center	Minneapolis, Minnesota, U.S.	625,000
4.	UFC 91	Couture vs. Lesnar	November 15, 2008	MGM Grand Garden Arena	Las Vegas, Nevada, U.S.	1,010,000
5.	UFC 100	Lesnar vs. Mir 2	July 11, 2009	Mandalay Bay Events Center	Las Vegas, Nevada, U.S.	1,600,000
6.	UFC 116	Lesnar vs. Carwin	July 3, 2010	MGM Grand Garden Arena	Las Vegas, Nevada, U.S.	1,160,000
7.	UFC 121	Lesnar vs. Velasquez	October 23, 2010	Honda Center	Anaheim, California, U.S.	1,050,000
8.	UFC 141	Lesnar vs. Overeem	December 30, 2011	MGM Grand Garden Arena	Las Vegas, Nevada, U.S.	750,000
9.	UFC 200	Lesnar vs. Hunt (co)	July 9, 2016	T-Mobile Arena	Las Vegas, Nevada, U.S.	1,009,000
Total sales						7,889,000

== Championships and accomplishments ==
=== Collegiate wrestling ===
- National Collegiate Athletic Association
  - NCAA Division I All-American (1999, 2000)
  - NCAA Division I Heavyweight National Runner-Up (1999)
  - NCAA Division I Heavyweight Champion (2000)
  - Big Ten Conference Champion (1999, 2000)
- National Junior College Athletic Association
  - NJCAA All-American (1997, 1998)
  - NJCAA Heavyweight Champion (1998)
  - North Dakota State University Bison Tournament Champion (1997–1999)
- Bismarck State College
  - Bismarck Athletics Hall of Fame (2005)
- University of Minnesota
  - M Club Hall of Fame (2026)

=== Mixed martial arts ===
- Ultimate Fighting Championship
  - UFC Heavyweight Championship (1 time)
    - Two successful title defenses
  - Submission of the Night (One time) vs. Shane Carwin
    - Fewest MMA bouts to become a UFC champion (4)
  - UFC.com Awards
    - 2008: Newcomer of the Year, Ranked #7 Fighter of the Year & Ranked #8 Upset of the Year vs. Randy Couture
    - 2010: Ranked #4 Fight of the Year vs. Shane Carwin
- Inside Fights
  - Biggest Draw (2008)
  - Rookie of the Year (2008)
- Sherdog
  - Beatdown of the Year (2009)
- Sports Illustrated
  - Top Newcomer of the Year (2008)
- World MMA Awards
  - Breakthrough Fighter of the Year (2009)
- Wrestling Observer Newsletter
  - Best Box Office Draw (2008–2010)
  - MMA Most Valuable Fighter (2008–2010)
- Bloody Elbow
  - Breakout Fighter of the Year (2008)
- MMA HQ
  - Breakout Fighter of the Year (2008)
- MMA Fighting
  - 2008 #10 Ranked UFC Knockout of the Year vs. Randy Couture at UFC 91

=== Professional wrestling ===
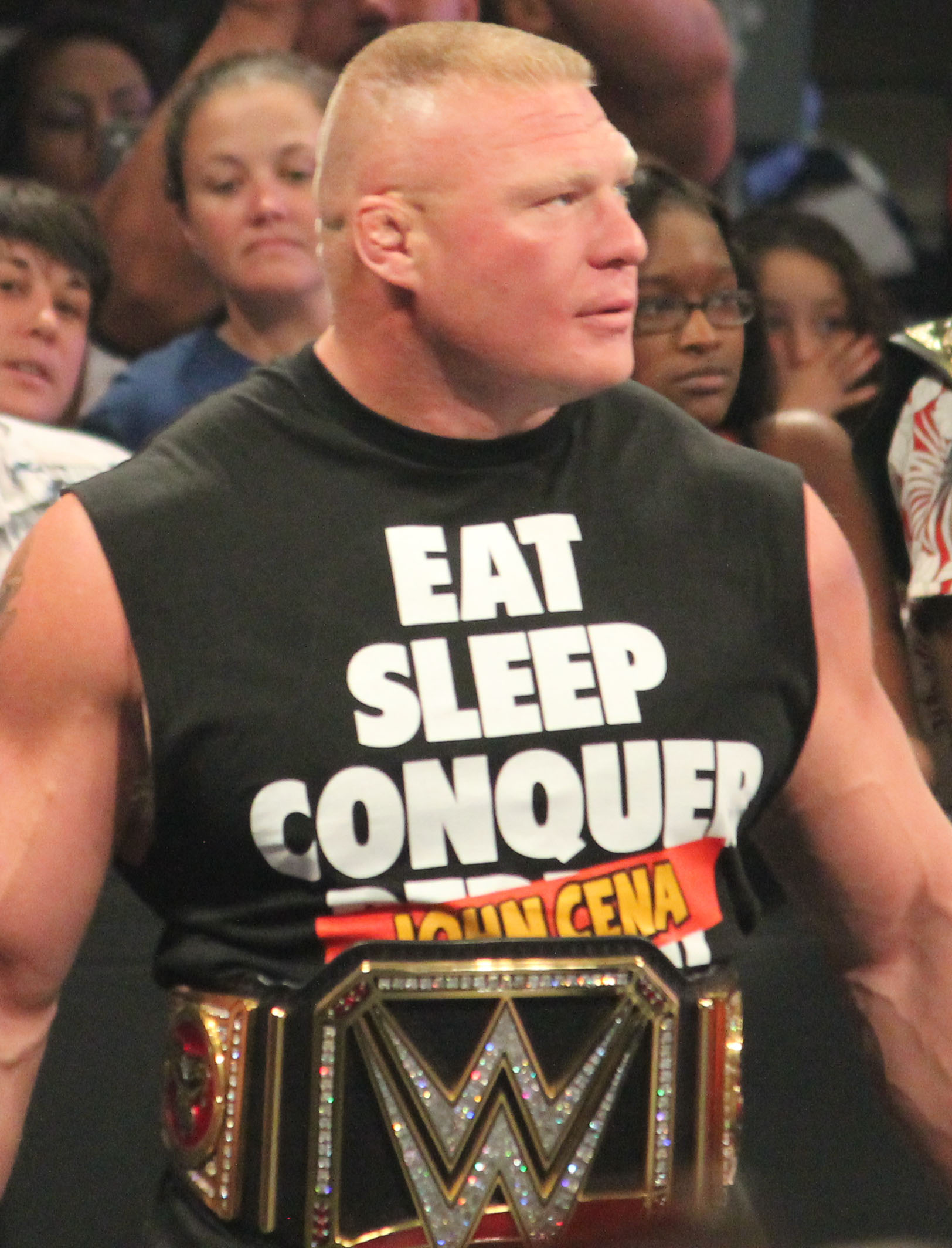
Lesnar is a seven-time WWE Champion.

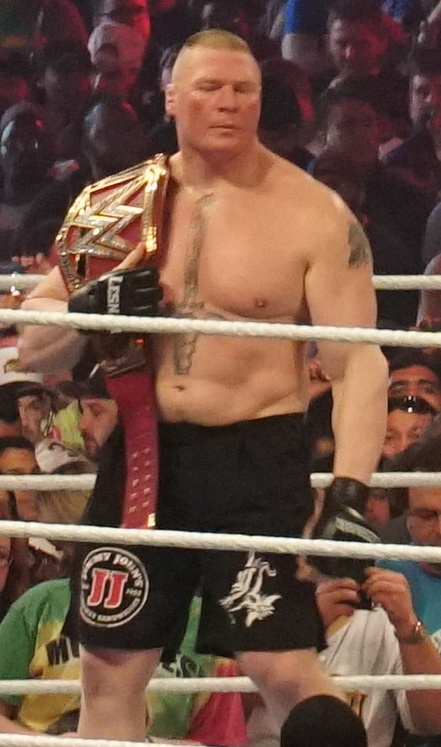
Lesnar is also a record three-time Universal Champion; making him a 10-time world champion within WWE.

- Guinness World Records
  - World record: Youngest person to win the WWE Championship (aged 25 years, 44 days)
- Inoki Genome Federation
  - IWGP Heavyweight Championship (1 time) (Note: Lesnar's IWGP Heavyweight Championship reign at IGF is considered a continuation of his reign from NJPW.)
- New Japan Pro-Wrestling
  - IWGP Heavyweight Championship (1 time)
- New York Post
  - Best OMG Moment (2022) Brock Lesnar arriving on a tractor and lifting the ring at SummerSlam
- Ohio Valley Wrestling
  - OVW Southern Tag Team Championship (3 times) – with Shelton Benjamin
- Pro Wrestling Illustrated
  - Feud of the Year (2003) vs. Kurt Angle
  - Feud of the Year (2015) vs. The Undertaker
  - Match of the Year (2003) vs. Kurt Angle in an Iron Man match on SmackDown! on September 16
  - Most Hated Wrestler of the Year (2018)
  - Most Improved Wrestler of the Year (2002)
  - Wrestler of the Year (2002, 2014)
  - Ranked No. 1 of the top 500 singles wrestlers in the PWI 500 in 2003
- Rolling Stone
  - Most Unavoidable Face Turn (2015)
- Wrestling Observer Newsletter
  - Best Brawler (2003)
  - Best Wrestling Maneuver (2002) F-5
  - Feud of the Year (2003) vs. Kurt Angle
  - Most Improved Wrestler (2002, 2003)
  - Best Box Office Draw of the Decade (2010s)
  - Wrestling Observer Newsletter Hall of Fame (Class of 2015)
- World Wrestling Entertainment/WWE
  - WWE Championship (7 times (Note: When Lesnar first won the title, it was known as the WWE Undisputed Championship. His second, third, fifth, sixth and seventh were as WWE Champion, while his fourth was as WWE World Heavyweight Champion.))
  - WWE Universal Championship (3 times)
  - King of the Ring (2002)
  - Men's Money in the Bank (2019)
  - Royal Rumble (2003, 2022)
  - Slammy Award (5 times)
    - Hashtag of the Year (2015) – #SuplexCity
    - Match of the Year (2015) – vs The Undertaker at Hell in a Cell
    - Rivalry of the Year (2015) – vs The Undertaker
    - "Tell Me You Didn't Just Say That" Moment of the Year (2015) – Coining "Suplex City" at WrestleMania 31
    - The OMG Shocking Moment of the Year (2014) – Ending The Undertaker's WrestleMania streak at WrestleMania XXX
  - WWE Year-End Award for Hottest Rivalry (2018) – vs. Roman Reigns

== See also ==
- Comparison of professional wrestling and mixed martial arts
- List of gridiron football players who became professional wrestlers
- List of male mixed martial artists
- List of multi-sport athletes
- List of multi-sport champions
- List of UFC champions
