= UFC 87 =

UFC mixed martial arts event in 2008

UFC 87: Seek and Destroy
- The poster for UFC 87: Seek and Destroy
- Promotion: Ultimate Fighting Championship
- Date: August 9, 2008
- Venue: Target Center
- City: Minneapolis, Minnesota
- Attendance: 15,087
- Total gate: $2,252,000
- Buyrate: 625,000

Event chronology
UFC Fight Night: Silva vs. Irvin	UFC 87: Seek and Destroy	UFC 88: Breakthrough

UFC 87: Seek and Destroy was a mixed martial arts event held by the Ultimate Fighting Championship on August 9, 2008, at the Target Center in Minneapolis, Minnesota. It is the twenty-first UFC event for the Pay-Per-View broadcast in high-definition.

== Background ==
The card was headlined by a welterweight championship bout between champion Georges St-Pierre and challenger Jon Fitch.

UFC Hall of Famer Mark Coleman was first scheduled to fight Brock Lesnar, but an Achilles tendon injury forced him to withdraw. Heath Herring stepped in to fight Lesnar instead.

Future UFC Light Heavyweight Champion Jon Jones made his UFC debut at this event after stepping in to replace Tomasz Drwal who pulled out of his bout with André Gusmão due to injury.

== Results ==
Main card (PPV)
Weight class				Method	Round	Time	Notes
Welterweight	Georges St-Pierre (c)	def.	Jon Fitch	Decision (unanimous) (50–43, 50–44, 50–44)	5	5:00	(Note: For the UFC Welterweight Championship)
Heavyweight	Brock Lesnar	def.	Heath Herring	Decision (unanimous) (30–26, 30–26, 30–26)	3	5:00
Lightweight	Rob Emerson	def.	Manvel Gamburyan	KO (punches)	1	0:12
Lightweight	Kenny Florian	def.	Roger Huerta	Decision (unanimous) (30–27, 30–27, 30–27)	3	5:00
Middleweight	Demian Maia	def.	Jason MacDonald	Submission (rear-naked choke)	3	2:44
Preliminary card
Welterweight	Tamdan McCrory	def.	Luke Cummo	Decision (unanimous) (29–28, 30–27, 30–27)	3	5:00
Heavyweight	Cheick Kongo	def.	Dan Evensen	TKO (punches)	1	4:55
Light Heavyweight	Jon Jones	def.	André Gusmão	Decision (unanimous) (30–27, 29–28, 30–27)	3	5:00
Welterweight	Chris Wilson	def.	Steve Bruno	Decision (unanimous) (30–27, 30–27, 30–27)	3	5:00
Welterweight	Ben Saunders	def.	Ryan Thomas	Submission (armbar)	2	2:28

== Bonus awards ==
The following fighters received $60,000 bonuses.

- Fight of the Night: Georges St-Pierre vs. Jon Fitch
- Knockout of the Night: Rob Emerson
- Submission of the Night: Demian Maia

== See also ==
- Ultimate Fighting Championship
- List of UFC champions
- List of UFC events
- 2008 in UFC
