= Dan Evensen =

Norwegian kickboxer and mixed martial artist (born 1974)

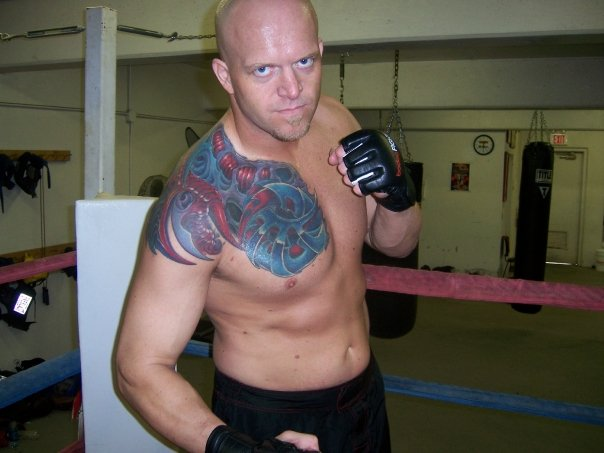
- Born: Dan Tore Evensen; June 1, 1974 (age 52); Arendal, Norway
- Other names: The Viking
- Nationality: Norwegian
- Height: 6 ft 3 in (1.91 m)
- Weight: 252.5 lb (114.5 kg; 18.04 st)
- Division: Heavyweight
- Style: Kickboxing
- Stance: Orthodox
- Fighting out of: Arendal, Norway
- Team: Kick Training Center
- Rank: Purple belt in Brazilian Jiu-Jitsu
- Years active: 2002–2009

Mixed martial arts record
- Total: 15
- Wins: 11
- By knockout: 7
- By submission: 1
- By decision: 2
- Unknown: 1
- Losses: 4
- By knockout: 4

Other information
- Mixed martial arts record from Sherdog

Dan Tore Evensen (born June 1, 1974) is a Norwegian mixed martial artist and former K-1 Kickboxer. Evensen has fought for the Ultimate Fighting Championship, Bellator Fighting Championships, and the now defunct BodogFIGHT.

== Background ==
He was a promising hammer thrower, and at 16 he had a personal record at 52.50 meters. He also did boxing and American football, playing for the local team Arendal Wildcats for several years. He was taken out to participate on the Norwegian National American football team in the 90's. As a junior in 1994 he was a Norwegian team-champion in judo. He left Norway to attend the University of Texas at El Paso, Texas, and extended his hammer throw to over 60 meters, with the 2000 Summer Olympics as a goal. He went back to Norway and was working as a ship mechanic, but decided to give the United States another try, this time as a martial artist.

He has a purple belt in Brazilian Jiu-Jitsu (US). He is a former Gladiator Challenge Heavyweight Champion.

== Mixed martial arts record ==
Professional record breakdown
15 matches	11 wins	4 losses
By knockout	7	4
By submission	1	0
By decision	2	0
Unknown	1	0

Res.	Record	Opponent	Method	Event	Date	Round	Time	Location	Notes
Win	11–4	Raoul Romero	TKO (punches)	Bellator 5	May 1, 2009	2	1:43	Dayton, Ohio, United States	
Loss	10–4	Pat Barry	TKO (leg kicks)	UFC 92	December 27, 2008	1	2:36	Las Vegas, Nevada, United States	
Loss	10–3	Cheick Kongo	TKO (punches)	UFC 87	August 9, 2008	1	4:55	Minneapolis, Minnesota, United States	
Win	10–2	Konstantin Gluhov	Decision (unanimous)	BodogFIGHT: USA vs. Russia	November 30, 2007	3	5:00	Moscow, Russia	
Win	9–2	John George	TKO (punches)	IFO: Kimmons vs Yunker	September 21, 2007	1	0:54	Nevada, United States	
Win	8–2	Dominic Richard	TKO (punches)	BodogFIGHT: Vancouver	August 24, 2007	1	0:46	British Columbia, Canada	
Win	7–2	Jeremiah Constant	TKO (punches)	BodogFIGHT: Costa Rica	February 17, 2007	1	1:26	Costa Rica	
Loss	6–2	Dan Bobish	TKO (submission to punches)	Xtreme Fight Series 2	October 14, 2006	1	1:25	Idaho, United States	
Loss	6–1	Christian Wellisch	TKO (corner stoppage)	IFC: Caged Combat	April 1, 2006	2	5:00	California, United States	
Win	6–0	Rob Wince	TKO (corner stoppage)	WEF: Sin City	May 20, 2005	1	5:00	Nevada, United States	
Win	5–0	Ruben Villareal	KO (punches)	GC 32: King of the Hill	November 18, 2004	2	1:38	California, United States	
Win	4–0	Julius Askew	Decision (unanimous)	GC 27: FightFest 2	June 3, 2004	3	5:00	California, United States	
Win	3–0	Mike Wolmack	TKO (punches)	GC 27: FightFest 2	June 3, 2004	1	2:57	California, United States	
Win	2–0	Jonah Broad	Submission (rear–naked choke)	GC 26: FightFest 1	June 2, 2004	1	0:51	California, United States	
Win	1–0	Scott Wallace	N/A	RMS 2: Rocky Mountain Slammer 2	May 11, 2002	N/A	N/A	Colorado, United States	

== Kickboxing record ==
0 Wins (0 (T) KO's, 0 decision), 2 Losses
Date	Result	Record	Opponent	Event	Method	Round	Time	Location
March 22, 2008	Loss	0-2 (1)	(United States) Bryan Humes	XFA 1	Decision (Unanimous)	3	3:00	Las Vegas, Nevada, United States
June 22, 2007	NC	0-1 (1)	(United States) Ethen Cox	Tuff-N-Uff 3	NC (Evensen fell out of the ring)	2	2:34	Las Vegas, Nevada, United States
April 30, 2005	Loss	0-1	(United States) Steve Steinbeiss	K-1 World Grand Prix 2005 in Las Vegas	Decision (Unanimous)	3	3:00	Las Vegas, Nevada, United States
