= Steve Bruno =

American mixed martial arts fighter

- Born: November 3, 1981 (age 44); Brooklyn, New York, United States
- Other names: Hollywood
- Nationality: American
- Height: 5 ft 10 in (1.78 m)
- Weight: 174.3 lb (79.1 kg; 12.45 st)
- Division: Welterweight
- Fighting out of: Coral Springs, Florida, United States
- Team: American Top Team
- Years active: 2001–2012

Mixed martial arts record
- Total: 21
- Wins: 15
- By knockout: 6
- By submission: 7
- By decision: 2
- Losses: 6
- By knockout: 2
- By decision: 4

Other information
- Notable relatives: James Bruno, Mike Bruno, brother
- Mixed martial arts record from Sherdog
- Last updated on: August 7, 2011

Steve Bruno (born November 3, 1981) is an American professional mixed martial artist currently competing in the Welterweight division. A professional competitor since 2001, Bruno has formerly competed for the UFC, the IFL, and the MFC.

== Mixed martial arts career ==
=== Early career ===
Bruno started his mixed martial arts career in May 2001, when he faced Opie Barr at Rumble in Chula Vista 1. He won the fight via armbar submission. Following this, Bruno would compile a professional record of 11–3 before signing with the UFC in mid-2008.

=== Ultimate Fighting Championship ===
With a record of 11–3, Bruno signed with the Ultimate Fighting Championship. He was expected to face Chad Reiner in his debut at UFC Fight Night 10 on June 12, 2007. However, Bruno was forced out of the bout due to injury and was replaced by Anthony Johnson.

Bruno was then scheduled to face Chris Wilson at UFC 86 on July 5, 2008. However, the fight would be postponed and instead took place at UFC 87 on August 9, 2008. Bruno lost the fight via unanimous decision.

Bruno was expected to face Luke Cummo at UFC: Fight for the Troops on December 10, 2008. However, Cummo was forced out of the bout due to injury and was replaced by Johnny Rees. He won the bout via second round rear-naked choke.

In his third fight in the promotion, Bruno faced Matt Riddle at UFC Fight Night: Lauzon vs. Stephens on February 7, 2009. He lost the fight via unanimous decision, and was subsequently released from the promotion after dropping to 1–2.

=== Championship and Accomplishments ===
  - Spirit MC Middleweight (-80 kg) Championship (One time;)

=== Post-UFC career ===
Fighting outside of the UFC, Bruno faced Clayton McKinney at AFL: Rumble on the Rock on September 25, 2009. He won the fight via D'arce choke. He then faced Robert Thompson at MFA: New Generation 3 on September 18, 2010. He won the fight via submission (punches).

Bruno moved to 3–0 since his UFC release, when he won a unanimous decision over Anderson Melo at Fight Time 10 on June 22, 2012. In his latest fight, Bruno faced Keith Johnson at Fight Time 12 on November 2, 2012. He lost the fight via TKO, snapping his three fight winning streak.

== Coaching career ==
Bruno is currently a striking coach at American Top Team.

== Personal life ==
Before starting his mixed martial arts career, Bruno was a Naval Air Crewman and Rescue Swimmer in the United States Navy.

== Mixed martial arts record ==
Professional record breakdown
21 matches	15 wins	6 losses
By knockout	6	2
By submission	7	0
By decision	2	4

Res.	Record	Opponent	Method	Event	Date	Round	Time	Location	Notes
Loss	15–6	Keith Johnson	TKO (punches)	Fight Time 12: Warriors Collide	November 2, 2012	2	3:46	Fort Lauderdale, Florida, United States	Catchweight (175 lbs) bout.
Win	15–5	Anderson Melo	Decision (unanimous)	Fight Time 10: It's Personal	June 22, 2012	3	5:00	Fort Lauderdale, Florida, United States	Catchweight (174 lbs) bout.
Win	14–5	Robert Thompson	Submission (punches)	MFA: New Generation 3	September 18, 2010	2	3:48	Miami, Florida, United States	
Win	13–5	Clayton McKinney	Submission (D'arce choke)	AFL: Rumble on the Rock	September 25, 2009	2	1:33	Hollywood, Florida, United States	
Loss	12–5	Matt Riddle	Decision (unanimous)	UFC Fight Night: Lauzon vs. Stephens	February 7, 2009	3	5:00	Tampa, Florida, United States	
Win	12–4	Johnny Rees	Submission (rear-naked choke)	UFC: Fight For The Troops	December 10, 2008	2	3:44	Fayetteville, North Carolina, United States	
Loss	11–4	Chris Wilson	Decision (unanimous)	UFC 87	August 9, 2008	3	5:00	Minneapolis, Minnesota, United States	
Win	11–3	Lim Jae-Suk	KO (punches)	Spirit MC 11: Invasion	April 22, 2007	3	2:52	Seoul, South Korea	Won Spirit MC Middleweight (176 lbs) Championship.
Win	10–3	Ho Jin Kim	KO (punch)	Spirit MC: Interleague 5	March 11, 2007	2	4:24	Seoul, South Korea	
Win	9–3	Graydon Tannas	Submission (rear-naked choke)	MFC 11: Gridiron	February 3, 2007	1	1:15	Edmonton, Alberta, Canada	
Win	8–3	Young Choi	KO (punches)	Spirit MC 9: Welterweight GP Opening	October 8, 2006	3	3:19	Seoul, South Korea	
Loss	7–3	Bart Palaszewski	KO (punch)	IFL: Championship 2006	June 3, 2006	1	1:48	Atlantic City, New Jersey, United States	
Loss	7–2	Landon Showalter	Decision (unanimous)	MFC: Boardwalk Blitz	March 4, 2006	2	5:00	Atlantic City, New Jersey, United States	
Win	7–1	Jay Jack	TKO (punches)	Euphoria: USA vs. Japan	November 5, 2005	1	4:02	Atlantic City, New Jersey, United States	
Win	6–1	Anthony Tolone	TKO (punches)	AFC 13: Absolute Fighting Championships 13	July 30, 2005	1	3:51	Fort Lauderdale, Florida, United States	
Win	5–1	Chris Schlesinger	Decision (majority)	RF 8: Reality Fighting 8	April 2, 2005	2	5:00	Atlantic City, New Jersey, United States	
Win	4–1	Gino Astudillo	TKO (punches)	AFC 9: Absolute Fighting Championships 9	July 31, 2004	1	0:40	Fort Lauderdale, Florida, United States	
Win	3–1	Jorge Cuellar	Submission (rear-naked choke)	RM 3: Reto Maximo 3	March 14, 2003	1	1:51	Tijuana, Mexico	
Loss	2–1	Heath Sims	Decision (unanimous)	XP 2: Xtreme Pankration 2	April 12, 2002	2	5:00	Los Angeles, California, United States	
Win	2–0	Jeff Gibson	Submission (armbar)	RICV 2: Rumble in Chula Vista 2	July 21, 2001	N/A	N/A	San Diego, California, United States	
Win	1–0	Opie Barr	Submission (armbar)	RICV 1: Rumble in Chula Vista 1	May 19, 2001	N/A	N/A	San Diego, California, United States	
