= Chris Wilson (fighter) =

American mixed martial arts fighter (born 1977)

- Born: Christopher Ross Wilson; June 7, 1977 (age 49); Portland, Oregon, United States
- Other names: The Professor
- Height: 6 ft 1 in (1.85 m)
- Weight: 155 lb (70 kg; 11.1 st)
- Division: Welterweight; Lightweight
- Reach: 75.0 in (191 cm)
- Fighting out of: Ribeirão Preto, Brazil; Portland, Oregon, United States
- Team: Team Quest; Nova Uniao
- Rank: Black belt in Brazilian Jiu-Jitsu
- Years active: 2002-2013

Mixed martial arts record
- Total: 29
- Wins: 18
- By knockout: 7
- By submission: 8
- By decision: 3
- Losses: 10
- By knockout: 1
- By submission: 2
- By decision: 7
- No contests: 1

Other information
- Mixed martial arts record from Sherdog

Christopher Ross Wilson (born June 7, 1977) is an American professional mixed martial arts fighter who last competed in 2013. A professional competitor since 2002, Wilson has formerly competed for the UFC, the IFL, and King of the Cage.

== Mixed martial arts career ==
=== Early career ===
Wilson made his professional mixed martial arts debut on December 13, 2003, when he faced Elder Pyatt at Rumble at the Roseland 10. He won his debut via KO punch, ten seconds into the first round.

Following this impressive win, Wilson would compile a record of 15–4 (1), with notable victories in the International Fight League (IFL) over Jay Hieron, Pat Healy, and Rory Markham before signing with UFC in early 2008.

=== Ultimate Fighting Championship ===
Wilson made his UFC debut against Jon Fitch at UFC 82 on March 1, 2008. He lost the fight via unanimous decision. Wilson was then expected to face Steve Bruno at UFC 86 on July 5, 2008, however, the fight was rescheduled and instead took place at UFC 87 on August 9, 2008. He won the fight via unanimous decision.

In his third fight in the promotion, Wilson faced promotional newcomer John Howard at UFC 94 on January 31, 2009. Wilson lost the fight via split decision, putting his record at 1–2 in the promotion.

He then faced Mike Pyle at UFC Fight Night 19 on September 16, 2009. He lost the fight via guillotine choke submission, and was subsequently released from the promotion.

=== Post-UFC career ===
In his first fight since his UFC release, Wilson faced Keith Wisniewski at HFC 7: Validation on April 9, 2011. He lost the fight via unanimous decision.

Wilson then faced Wellington Oliveira at Brazilian FC: Desafio dos Imortais on December 16, 2011, defeating Oliveira via rear-naked choke.

He faced Irwing Machado at Brazilian FC 3: Lutadores Imortais on August 11, 2012. Wilson won the fight via D'arce choke in the first round. In his next fight, Wilson faced Leandro Silva at Predador FC 23 on March 9, 2013. He lost the fight via split decision.

Wilson faced Walmir Lazaro at Shooto Brazil 42 on August 25, 2013. He lost the fight via KO (punch).

== Personal life ==
Chris and his wife have three children, two sons and a daughter. Currently, he lives in Ribeirão Preto, Brazil.

== Mixed martial arts record ==
Professional record breakdown
29 matches	18 wins	10 losses
By knockout	7	1
By submission	8	2
By decision	3	7
No contests	1	

Res.	Record	Opponent	Method	Event	Date	Round	Time	Location	Notes
Loss	18–10 (1)	Walmir Lazaro	KO (punch)	Shooto Brazil 42	August 25, 2013	2	4:38	Rio de Janeiro, Brazil	
Loss	18–9 (1)	Leandro Silva	Decision (split)	Predador FC 23	March 9, 2013	3	5:00	Sao Paulo, Brazil	Return to Lightweight.
Win	18–8 (1)	Irwing Machado	Submission (D'arce choke)	Brazilian Fighting Championship 3: Lutadores Imortais	August 11, 2012	1	1:25	Ribeirão Preto, São Paulo, Brazil	
Win	17–8 (1)	Wellington Oliveira	Submission (rear-naked choke)	Brazilian Fighting Championship: Desafio dos Imortais	December 16, 2011	1	4:22	Ribeirão Preto, São Paulo, Brazil	
Loss	16–8 (1)	Keith Wisniewski	Decision (unanimous)	HFC 7: Validation	April 9, 2011	3	5:00	Valparaiso, Indiana, United States	
Loss	16–7 (1)	Mike Pyle	Submission (guillotine choke)	UFC Fight Night 19	September 16, 2009	3	2:15	Oklahoma City, Oklahoma, United States	
Loss	16–6 (1)	John Howard	Decision (split)	UFC 94	January 31, 2009	3	5:00	Las Vegas, Nevada, United States	
Win	16–5 (1)	Steve Bruno	Decision (unanimous)	UFC 87	August 9, 2008	3	5:00	Minneapolis, Minnesota, United States	
Loss	15–5 (1)	Jon Fitch	Decision (unanimous)	UFC 82	March 1, 2008	3	5:00	Columbus, Ohio, United States	
Win	15–4 (1)	Derrick Noble	Decision (unanimous)	SportFight 20: Homecoming	October 27, 2007	3	5:00	Portland, Oregon, United States	
Win	14–4 (1)	Ray Steinbeiss	Submission (armbar)	BodogFIGHT: Vancouver	August 24, 2007	2	4:00	Vancouver, British Columbia, Canada	
Win	13–4 (1)	Rory Markham	TKO (punches)	IFL: Championship Final	December 29, 2006	1	2:14	Uncasville, Connecticut, United States	
Win	12–4 (1)	Jay Hieron	Decision (unanimous)	IFL: World Championship Semifinals	November 2, 2006	3	4:00	Portland, Oregon, United States	
Loss	11–4 (1)	Brad Blackburn	Decision (unanimous)	IFL: Portland	September 9, 2006	3	4:00	Portland, Oregon, United States	
Win	11–3 (1)	LaVerne Clark	Submission (triangle choke)	SportFight 17: Hot Zone	August 5, 2006	3	3:51	Portland, Oregon, United States	
Loss	10–3 (1)	Nick Thompson	Submission (kimura)	AFC 17: Absolute Fighting Championships 17	June 24, 2006	2	2:08	Fort Lauderdale, Florida, United States	
Win	10–2 (1)	Pat Healy	KO (knee)	SportFight 14: Resolution	January 6, 2006	1	1:28	Portland, Oregon, United States	Return to Welterweight.
Win	9–2 (1)	Cruz Chacon	Submission (triangle choke)	KOTC: Conquest	December 3, 2005	2	2:43	Calgary, Alberta, Canada	Lightweight debut.
Win	8–2 (1)	Dave Garcia	Submission (triangle choke)	FFC 15: Fiesta Las Vegas	April 14, 2005	1	1:49	Las Vegas, Nevada, United States	
Win	7–2 (1)	Brandon Melendez	KO (punch)	SportFight 10: Mayhem	May 28, 2005	1	2:30	Gresham, Oregon, United States	
Win	6–2 (1)	Jerome Isaacs	Submission (triangle choke)	XFC: Dome of Destruction 2	April 30, 2005	1	0:57	Tacoma, Washington, United States	
Win	5–2 (1)	Damian Hatch	TKO (punches)	SportFight 4: Fight For Freedom	March 26, 2005	3	1:55	Gresham, Oregon, United States	
Loss	4–2 (1)	Eddy Ellis	Decision (unanimous)	SF 4: Fight For Freedom	June 26, 2004	3	5:00	Gresham, Oregon, United States	
NC	4–1 (1)	Stale Nyang	No Contest	EVT 3: Inferno	May 22, 2004	N/A	N/A	Copenhagen, Denmark	
Loss	4–1	Cam Ward	Decision (split)	SF 2: On the Move	March 19, 2004	3	5:00	Portland, Oregon, United States	
Win	4–0	Scott Poyer	TKO (punches)	SF 1: Revolution	February 21, 2004	1	0:16	Lynnwood, Washington, United States	
Win	3–0	Chris Young	Submission (triangle choke)	UFCF: Night of Champions	January 31, 2004	1	1:03	Lynnwood, Washington, United States	
Win	2–0	Joey Rubio	TKO (punches)	PPKA: Ultimate Fight Night 3	January 3, 2004	2	1:37	Yakima, Washington, United States	
Win	1–0	Elder Pyatt	KO (punch)	FCFF: Rumble at the Roseland 10	December 13, 2003	1	0:10	Portland, Oregon, United States	
