= UFC 81 =

UFC mixed martial arts event in 2008

UFC 81: Breaking Point
- The poster for UFC 81: Breaking Point
- Promotion: Ultimate Fighting Championship
- Date: February 2, 2008
- Venue: Mandalay Bay Events Center
- City: Las Vegas, Nevada
- Attendance: 10,583 (7,167 paid)
- Total gate: $2,437,890
- Buyrate: 650,000

Event chronology
UFC Fight Night: Swick vs. Burkman	UFC 81: Breaking Point	UFC 82: Pride of a Champion

UFC 81: Breaking Point was a mixed martial arts (MMA) event held on February 2, 2008, by the Ultimate Fighting Championship (UFC) at the Mandalay Bay Events Center on the Las Vegas Strip.

== Background ==
The main event featured Tim Sylvia and Antônio Rodrigo "Minotauro" Nogueira for the UFC Interim World Heavyweight Championship. UFC Heavyweight champion Randy Couture declined a championship fight with Nogueira, which resulted in the creation of the interim title.

This event also saw the UFC debut of WWE wrestler Brock Lesnar in a bout against former UFC heavyweight champion Frank Mir.

== Results ==
Main card (PPV)
Weight class				Method	Round	Time	Notes
Heavyweight	Antônio Rodrigo Nogueira	def.	Tim Sylvia	Submission (guillotine choke)	3	1:28	(Note: For the interim UFC Heavyweight Championship.)
Heavyweight	Frank Mir	def.	Brock Lesnar	Submission (kneebar)	1	1:30	(Note: Lesnar had 1 point deducted in round 1 for strikes to the back of the head.)
Middleweight	Nate Marquardt	def.	Jeremy Horn	Submission (guillotine choke)	2	1:37
Middleweight	Ricardo Almeida	def.	Rob Yundt	Submission (guillotine choke)	1	1:08
Lightweight	Tyson Griffin	def.	Gleison Tibau	Decision (unanimous) (30–27, 30–27, 30–27)	3	5:00
Preliminary card
Welterweight	Chris Lytle	def.	Kyle Bradley	TKO (punches)	1	0:33
Middleweight	Marvin Eastman	def.	Terry Martin	Decision (unanimous) (29–28, 30–27, 30–27)	3	5:00
Light Heavyweight	Tim Boetsch	def.	David Heath	TKO (slam and punches)	1	4:52
Lightweight	Rob Emerson	def.	Keita Nakamura	Decision (split) (30–27, 28–29, 30–27)	3	5:00

== Bonus awards ==
The following fighters received $60,000 bonuses.

- Fight of the Night: Tim Sylvia vs. Antônio Rodrigo Nogueira
- Knockout of the Night: Chris Lytle
- Submission of the Night: Frank Mir

== See also ==
- Ultimate Fighting Championship
- List of UFC champions
- List of UFC events
- 2008 in UFC
