= UFC 82 =

UFC mixed martial arts event in 2008

UFC 82: Pride of a Champion
- The poster for UFC 82: Pride of a Champion
- Promotion: Ultimate Fighting Championship
- Date: March 1, 2008
- Venue: Nationwide Arena
- City: Columbus, Ohio
- Attendance: 16,431
- Total gate: $2,200,000
- Buyrate: 325,000

Event chronology
UFC 81: Breaking Point	UFC 82: Pride of a Champion	UFC Fight Night: Florian vs. Lauzon

UFC 82: Pride of a Champion was a mixed martial arts (MMA) event that took place on March 1, 2008, at the Nationwide Arena in Columbus, Ohio.

== Background ==
The main event was a UFC & Pride FC middleweight title unification match between UFC middleweight champion Anderson Silva and PRIDE FC welterweight champion Dan Henderson.

A welterweight matchup between Jon Fitch and Akihiro Gono was originally scheduled, but Gono was forced to withdraw after suffering a hand injury in training. Gono was replaced by Chris Wilson. The Fitch/Gono match up was eventually rescheduled for UFC 94.

Diego Sanchez was originally scheduled to faced Roan Carneiro but an undisclosed illness forced out Carneiro. David Bielkheden replaced Carneiro.

At the event, former UFC heavyweight champion Mark Coleman was inducted into the UFC Hall of Fame.

== Results ==
Main card (PPV)
Weight class				Method	Round	Time	Notes
Middleweight	Anderson Silva (UFC Champion)	def.	Dan Henderson (Pride Champion)	Submission (rear-naked choke)	2	4:52	(Note: Unification of the UFC Middleweight & Pride Welterweight Championship belts.)
Heavyweight	Heath Herring	def.	Cheick Kongo	Decision (split) (29–28, 28–29, 29–28)	3	5:00
Middleweight	Chris Leben	def.	Alessio Sakara	TKO (punches)	1	3:16
Middleweight	Yushin Okami	def.	Evan Tanner	KO (knee)	2	3:00
Welterweight	Jon Fitch	def.	Chris Wilson	Decision (unanimous) (30–27, 29–28, 30–27)	3	5:00
Preliminary card
Heavyweight	Andrei Arlovski	def.	Jake O'Brien	TKO (punches)	2	4:17
Welterweight	Josh Koscheck	def.	Dustin Hazelett	TKO (head kick and punches)	2	1:24
Welterweight	Diego Sanchez	def.	David Bielkheden	TKO (submission to strikes)	1	4:43
Welterweight	Luigi Fioravanti	def.	Luke Cummo	Decision (unanimous) (30–27, 30–27, 30–27)	3	5:00
Lightweight	Jorge Gurgel	def.	John Halverson	Decision (unanimous) (29–28, 29–28, 30–27)	3	5:00

== Bonus awards ==
The following fighters received $60,000 bonuses.

- Fight of the Night: Anderson Silva vs. Dan Henderson
- Knockout of the Night: Chris Leben
- Submission of the Night: Anderson Silva

== See also ==
- Ultimate Fighting Championship
- List of UFC champions
- List of UFC events
- 2008 in UFC
