= Shannon Gugerty =

Armenian mixed martial arts fighter

- Born: December 30, 1981 (age 44); San Diego, California, United States
- Height: 5 ft 10 in (1.78 m)
- Weight: 155 lb (70 kg; 11.1 st)
- Division: Lightweight; Featherweight
- Reach: 71 in (180 cm)
- Stance: Orthodox
- Fighting out of: San Diego, California, United States
- Team: The Boxing Club
- Years active: 2004–2012

Mixed martial arts record
- Total: 22
- Wins: 15
- By knockout: 4
- By submission: 11
- Losses: 7
- By knockout: 1
- By submission: 3
- By decision: 3

Other information
- Mixed martial arts record from Sherdog

Shannon Gugerty (born December 30, 1981) is an American retired mixed martial artist who last competed in the Featherweight division. A professional competitor from 2004 until 2012, he fought five times in the UFC, against notable names like Clay Guida, Terry Etim, and Spencer Fisher. He holds a win over Cub Swanson.

== Background ==
Born and raised in Chula Vista, Gugerty began Wrestling his freshman year of high school at the age of 14. As a senior, Gugerty began training in Brazilian Jiu-Jitsu and Sambo under the tutelage of Dean Lister. Later, Gugerty began training in Muay Thai and Boxing alongside fighters such as Brandon Vera.

== Mixed martial arts career ==
Gugerty made his MMA debut in 2005, defeating Cub Swanson at Total Combat 4. He went on to appear prominently in Total Combat, then moved upwards to the UFC when he was to appear against the then-undefeated Dale Hartt at UFC Fight Night: Silva vs. Irvin. Gugerty defeated Hartt by submission in the first round.

Gugerty went on to appear against Spencer Fisher at UFC 90, as a last-minute replacement for Melvin Guillard. Fisher submitted Gugerty in the third round via triangle choke. Gugerty would later defeat wrestling specialist Matt Grice at UFC 100 with a guillotine choke in the first round.

Gugerty fought Terry Etim on November 14, 2009, at UFC 105. He lost via submission (guillotine choke) in the second round. Etim had the guillotine locked in for almost 30 seconds before Gugerty tapped.

Gugerty faced Clay Guida on March 21, 2010, at UFC LIVE: Vera vs. Jones, replacing an injured Sean Sherk. Gugerty lost via second round submission. Following his loss to Guida, Gugerty was released from the promotion.

== Mixed martial arts record ==
Professional record breakdown
22 matches	15 wins	7 losses
By knockout	4	1
By submission	11	3
By decision	0	3

Res.	Record	Opponent	Method	Event	Date	Round	Time	Location	Notes
Loss	15–7	Owen Roddy	Decision (split)	Cage Contender 21	July 22, 2012	3	5:00	Dublin, Ireland	Featherweight debut; for Cage Contender Featherweight Championship.
Win	15–6	Ernie Davila	Submission (rear-naked choke)	Desert Rage Full Contact Fighting 10	October 22, 2011	1	3:59	Yuma, Arizona, United States	
Win	14–6	Cruz Gomez	Submission (guillotine choke)	CFS: The Uprising	July 24, 2011	1	1:32	San Diego, California United States	
Win	13–6	Roscoe Jackson	TKO (punches)	Desert Rage Full Contact Fighting 8	November 19, 2010	1	0:30	Yuma, Arizona, United States	
Loss	12–6	Dennis Bermudez	Decision (unanimous)	Shine Lightweight Grand Prix	September 10, 2010	2	5:00	Newkirk, Oklahoma, United States	
Loss	12–5	Clay Guida	Submission (arm-triangle choke)	UFC Live: Vera vs. Jones	March 21, 2010	2	3:40	Broomfield, Colorado, United States	
Loss	12–4	Terry Etim	Submission (guillotine choke)	UFC 105	November 14, 2009	2	1:24	Manchester, England	
Win	12–3	Matt Grice	Submission (guillotine choke)	UFC 100	July 11, 2009	1	2:36	Las Vegas, Nevada, United States	
Loss	11–3	Spencer Fisher	Submission (triangle choke)	UFC 90	October 25, 2008	3	3:56	Rosemont, Illinois, United States	
Win	11–2	Dale Hartt	Submission (rear-naked choke)	UFC Fight Night: Silva vs. Irvin	July 19, 2008	1	3:33	Las Vegas, Nevada, United States	
Win	10–2	Noah Tedesco	TKO	Desert Rage 3	April 26, 2008	1	4:04	Yuma, Arizona, United States	
Win	9–2	Johnny Torres	Submission (guillotine choke)	Total Combat 27	March 22, 2008	2	N/A	Yuma, Arizona, United States	
Win	8–2	Lucas Factor	TKO (punches)	TC 25: Fight Club	December 15, 2007	1	1:05	San Diego, California, United States	
Win	7–2	Paris Ruiz	Submission (rear-naked choke)	COF 7: Face Off	June 23, 2007	1	N/A	Tijuana, Mexico	
Win	6–2	Joe Nicholas	Submission (triangle choke)	Total Combat 21	June 8, 2007	2	1:35	San Diego, California, United States	
Win	5–2	Joey Radanzzo	Submission (strikes)	TC 18: Nightmare	November 4, 2006	1	1:52	San Diego, California, United States	
Win	4–2	Jose Carillo	TKO (punches)	TC 16: Annihilation	September 9, 2006	1	2:24	San Diego, California, United States	
Loss	3–2	Cub Swanson	TKO (punches)	TC 13: Anarchy	March 11, 2006	2	3:40	Del Mar, California, United States	
Loss	3–1	Shawn Bias	Decision (unanimous)	Total Combat 12	December 17, 2005	3	5:00	Tijuana, Mexico	
Win	3–0	Anthony Griffin	Submission (armbar)	Total Combat 9	July 30, 2005	1	N/A	Tijuana, Mexico	
Win	2–0	Josue Josue	Submission (rear-naked choke)	Total Combat 7	January 29, 2005	1	N/A	Tijuana, Mexico	
Win	1–0	Cub Swanson	Submission (rear-naked choke)	Total Combat 4	July 25, 2004	1	0:15	Tijuana, Mexico	
