= Minnesota Martial Arts Academy =

Mixed martial arts training organization in Minnesota

The Academy
- Est.: 1992
- Founded by: Greg Nelson
- Primary owners: Greg Nelson
- Primary trainers: Greg Nelson; Andy Grahn
- Past titleholders: Cole Konrad, Heavyweight Champion (Bellator 2010) 265 lb (120 kg); Brock Lesnar, Heavyweight Champion (UFC 2008) 265 lb (120 kg); Dave Menne, Middleweight Champion (UFC 2001) 185 lb (84 kg); Sean Sherk, Lightweight Champion (UFC 2007) 155 lb (70 kg); Nick Thompson, Welterweight Champion BodogFight 170 lb (77 kg); Kaitlin Young, Hook-N-Shoot Women's Tournament Champion 135 lb (61 kg)
- Prominent fighters: Brock Larson (UFC); Brock Lesnar (UFC); Sean Sherk (UFC); Nick Thompson (Strikeforce, Sengoku)
- Training facilities: Brooklyn Center, Minnesota, United States
- Website: theacademymn.com

The Minnesota Martial Arts Academy is a martial arts training center in Brooklyn Center, Minnesota. It was founded in 1992 by Greg Nelson, a former NCAA Division 1 wrestler at the University of Minnesota.

== History ==
The Academy provides training in combative martial arts that include Muay Thai, Wrestling, Boxing, Brazilian Jiu Jitsu, Judo, Kali, Jeet Kune Do, Modern Army Combatives, and Shootfighting. The Academy's MMA team, Team Academy, has a winning percentage of 80%

Greg Nelson combined his background in NCAA Division 1 wrestling, from college, with the Thai-boxing training he began in 1983 to form the basis of his Mixed Martial arts system. Starting the gym in 1992 the focus was on combative martial arts & sport martial arts. As The Academy grew it attracted future UFC champions such as Dave Menne, Brock Lesnar, Sean Sherk and Rose Namajunas.

== Notable fighters ==
- John Castañeda - UFC
- Pat Barry - UFC, K-1, Glory
- Mike Richman - Bellator Fighting Championships, Bare Knuckle Fighting Championship, Former Interim Light Heavyweight Bare Knuckle Fighting Championship Champion
- Sean Sherk - Former UFC Lightweight World Champion
- Brock Larson - UFC, WEC Title Contender
- Paul Bradley - UFC, Strikeforce, Bellator MMA
- Chris Tuchscherer - UFC
- Jacob Volkmann - UFC, Former VFC Welterweight Champion, FILA- Grappling World Champion 80 kg
- Nick Thompson - Former BodogFIGHT Welterweight World Champion, UFC Veteran, Strikeforce, Sengoku
- Jon Madsen - UFC TUF 10 cast member
- Logan Clark - UFC & WEC Veteran, Sengoku
- Kaitlin Young - Invicta Fighting Championships
- Brandon Girtz - Bellator Fighting Championships
- Nick Kirk - Bellator Fighting Championships
- Rose Namajunas - UFC Strawweight Champion, Invicta Fighting Championships, King of the cage

== Former fighters ==
- Jordan Parsons - Bellator
- Dave Menne - Former UFC Middleweight World Champion
- Nik Lentz - UFC
- Brad Kohler -Former UFC fighter
- Brock Lesnar - Former UFC Heavyweight World Champion
- Cole Konrad - Bellator Fighting Championships Heavyweight Tournament Champion
