= UFC 90 =

UFC mixed martial arts event in 2008

UFC 90: Silva vs. Côté
- The poster for UFC 90: Silva vs. Côté
- Promotion: Ultimate Fighting Championship
- Date: October 25, 2008
- Venue: Allstate Arena
- City: Rosemont, Illinois
- Attendance: 15,359
- Total gate: $2,850,000
- Buyrate: 300,000

Event chronology
UFC 89: Bisping vs. Leben	UFC 90: Silva vs. Côté	UFC 91: Couture vs. Lesnar

UFC 90: Silva vs. Côté was a mixed martial arts (MMA) pay-per-view event held by the Ultimate Fighting Championship (UFC) on October 25, 2008, at the Allstate Arena in Rosemont, Illinois.

== Background ==
The main event featured UFC Middleweight Champion Anderson Silva vs. number #1 contender Patrick Côté. Silva's original opponent was rumored to be Yushin Okami, but the fight was cancelled after Okami suffered a hand injury.

A scheduled bout between Thales Leites and Goran Reljic was scratched from the card due to an injury suffered by Reljic. Drew McFedries was chosen as Reljic's replacement.

Diego Sanchez suffered an injury while preparing for his bout against Thiago Alves and was forced to pull out. Josh Koscheck stepped in to fight instead.

Melvin Guillard was slated to fight Spencer Fisher, but was replaced by Shannon Gugerty.

Ricardo Almeida was replaced by Dan Miller due to an injury.

Marcus Aurélio replaced injured Gleison Tibau.

Future UFC Heavyweight Champion Junior dos Santos made his UFC debut at this event.

== Results ==
Main card (PPV)
Weight class				Method	Round	Time	Notes
Middleweight	Anderson Silva (c)	def.	Patrick Côté	TKO (knee injury)	3	0:39	(Note: For the UFC Middleweight Championship.)
Welterweight	Thiago Alves	def.	Josh Koscheck	Decision (unanimous) (30–27, 29–28, 30–27)	3	5:00
Lightweight	Gray Maynard	def.	Rich Clementi	Decision (unanimous) (30–27, 30–27, 30–27)	3	5:00
Heavyweight	Junior dos Santos	def.	Fabrício Werdum	TKO (punches)	1	1:20
Lightweight	Sean Sherk	def.	Tyson Griffin	Decision (unanimous) (30–27, 29–28, 29–28)	3	5:00
Preliminary card
Middleweight	Thales Leites	def.	Drew McFedries	Submission (rear-naked choke)	1	1:18
Lightweight	Spencer Fisher	def.	Shannon Gugerty	Submission (triangle choke)	3	3:56
Middleweight	Dan Miller	def.	Matt Horwich	Decision (unanimous) (29–28, 29–28, 29–28)	3	5:00
Lightweight	Hermes França	def.	Marcus Aurélio	Decision (unanimous) (30–27, 29–28, 29–28)	3	5:00
Welterweight	Pete Sell	def.	Josh Burkman	Decision (unanimous) (29–28, 29–28, 29–28)	3	5:00

== Bonus awards ==
The following fighters received $65,000 bonuses.

- Fight of the Night: Sean Sherk vs. Tyson Griffin
- Knockout of the Night: Junior dos Santos
- Submission of the Night: Spencer Fisher

== See also ==
- Ultimate Fighting Championship
- List of UFC champions
- List of UFC events
- 2008 in UFC
