= UFC Fight Night: Silva vs. Irvin =

UFC mixed martial arts event in 2008

- The poster for UFC Fight Night: Silva vs. Irvin
- Promotion: Ultimate Fighting Championship
- Date: July 19, 2008
- Venue: Palms Casino Resort
- City: Las Vegas, Nevada
- Attendance: 2,071
- Total purse: $623,000

Event chronology
UFC 86: Jackson vs. Griffin	UFC Fight Night: Silva vs. Irvin	UFC 87: Seek and Destroy

UFC Fight Night: Silva vs. Irvin (also known as UFC Fight Night 14) was a mixed martial arts event held by the Ultimate Fighting Championship (UFC) on July 19, 2008, at the Palms Casino Resort in Las Vegas, Nevada.

== Background ==
The main event marked Anderson "The Spider" Silva's first foray into the Light Heavyweight division, facing James "The Sandman" Irvin. After the fight, Irvin tested positive for methadone and oxymorphone.

This card was put together on an unusually short notice, it was an attempt to compete with rival promotion Affliction's PPV premiere.

The bout between Anthony Johnson and Kevin Burns ended in controversy. Referee Steve Mazzagatti awarded Burns the victory after Johnson fell to the ground following an eyepoke, despite the fact that Mazzagatti warned Burns several times during the fight about fouls. Johnson appealed the decision to the NSAC, but it was ultimately rejected.

The event was broadcast in the U.S. and Canada on Spike, and in the UK on Setanta Sports 2.

== Results ==
Main card (Spike TV)
Weight class				Method	Round	Time	Notes
Light Heavyweight	Anderson Silva	def.	James Irvin	KO (punches)	1	1:01
Light Heavyweight	Brandon Vera	def.	Reese Andy	Decision (unanimous) (30–27, 29–28, 30–27)	3	5:00
Lightweight	Frankie Edgar	def.	Hermes França	Decision (unanimous) (30–27, 30–27, 30–27)	3	5:00
Heavyweight	Cain Velasquez	def.	Jake O'Brien	TKO (punches)	1	2:02
Welterweight	Kevin Burns	def.	Anthony Johnson	TKO (eye injury)	3	3:35	(Note: The fight was stopped after Johnson went down following an illegal eye poke by Burns.)
Middleweight	C. B. Dollaway	def.	Jesse Taylor	Submission (Peruvian necktie)	1	3:58
Preliminary card
Middleweight	Tim Credeur	def.	Cale Yarbrough	TKO (punches)	1	1:54
Middleweight	Nate Loughran	def.	Johnny Rees	Submission (triangle choke)	1	4:21
Lightweight	Shannon Gugerty	def.	Dale Hartt	Submission (rear-naked choke)	1	3:33
Welterweight	Rory Markham	def.	Brodie Farber	KO (head kick)	1	1:37	(Note: This preliminary bout was aired on the broadcast following the Vera vs Andy bout.)
Welterweight	Brad Blackburn	def.	James Giboo	TKO (punches)	2	2:29

== Bonus awards ==
The following fighters received $25,000 bonuses.

- Fight of the Night: Frankie Edgar vs. Hermes França
- Knockout of the Night: Rory Markham
- Submission of the Night: C. B. Dollaway

== See also ==
- Ultimate Fighting Championship
- List of UFC champions
- List of UFC events
- 2008 in UFC
