= Spencer Fisher =

American mixed martial arts fighter

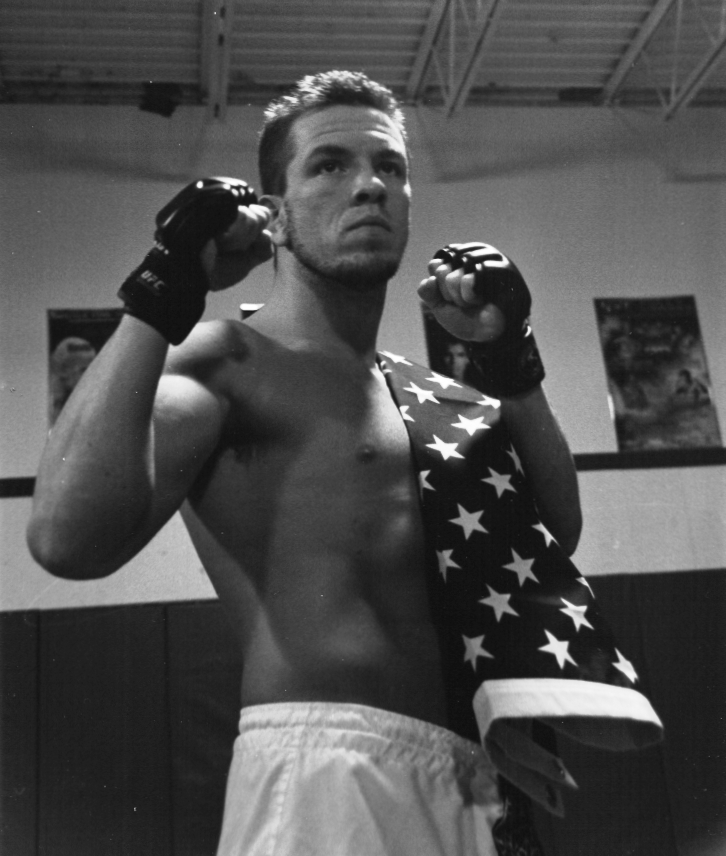
- Born: Spencer William Fisher; May 9, 1976 (age 50); Cashiers, North Carolina, U.S.
- Other names: The King, Porkchop
- Height: 5 ft 7 in (1.70 m)
- Weight: 155 lb (70 kg; 11.1 st)
- Division: Middleweight; Welterweight; Lightweight
- Reach: 68 in (170 cm)
- Stance: Southpaw
- Fighting out of: Davenport, Iowa, U.S.
- Team: Miletich Fighting Systems (2002–2008); Team Sityodtong (2010); Gracie Barra Chicago (2011); Team Evolution (2009–present); Kings MMA (2012)
- Years active: 2002–2012

Mixed martial arts record
- Total: 33
- Wins: 24
- By knockout: 10
- By submission: 9
- By decision: 5
- Losses: 9
- By knockout: 2
- By submission: 1
- By decision: 6

Other information
- Spouse: Emily
- Website: http://www.spencerfishertheking.com/
- Mixed martial arts record from Sherdog

Spencer William Fisher (born May 9, 1976) is a retired American mixed martial artist. A professional competitor from 2002–2012, he is best known for his 17-fight tenure with the UFC, winning "Fight of the Night" honors three times.

== Background ==
Fisher was born in Cashiers, North Carolina. He played soccer while growing up, and was also a fan of professional wrestling. Fisher was introduced to martial arts, when he began practicing Shotokan Karate and Jeet Kun Do at a young age in his school's cafeteria. Fisher then transitioned to boxing in 1992 and began training for MMA soon after. Before becoming a professional fighter, he worked in landscaping and security.

== Mixed martial arts career ==
=== Early career ===
Fisher made his professional mixed martial arts debut in 2002 and compiled a record of 14–1 before being signed by the UFC.

=== Ultimate Fighting Championship ===
He made his UFC debut at Ultimate Fight Night 2, scoring a second-round submission victory over Thiago Alves. He then defeated Aaron Riley at Ultimate Fight Night 3 by TKO due to a doctor stoppage after the first round after Fisher broke Riley's Jaw with strikes. Perhaps Fisher's most notable early fight was with Canadian kickboxer Sam Stout on the undercard of UFC 58. When Stout's original opponent Kenny Florian sustained an injury in training that left him unable to compete, Fisher took the fight on very late notice, reportedly having to cut twenty pounds in the final two days leading up to the match. Although Fisher seemed to land the harder punches, Stout landed more and came away with a controversial split decision.

Fisher returned at UFC 60 against Matt Wiman and won by knockout in the second round, knocking Wiman out with a flying knee. Fisher was able to record another first round TKO at UFC 64 against Dan Lauzon. His win streak came to a halt at Ultimate Fight Night 8, after a back and forth fight Fisher was defeated in the second round by TKO due to punches by Hermes França. The bout won the Fight of the Night award.

In a highly anticipated rematch, Fisher defeated Sam Stout at Fight Night 10 by unanimous decision after three rounds. This rematch with Stout propelled Fisher into the spotlight, as it was the main event, it won Fight of the Night and because both fighters took massive amounts of punishment throughout the fight. It has also been named as one of the UFC's 100 Greatest Fights. Fisher was scheduled to fight Din Thomas at UFC Fight Night 11, but was forced to withdraw due to a staph infection. Ironically, Fisher's replacement for this match was Kenny Florian, whom Fisher had replaced in the UFC 58 fight against Sam Stout.

Fisher fought Frankie Edgar at UFC 78 on November 17, 2007. Fisher lost the fight by unanimous decision. Fisher's next fight was scheduled to be against Marcus Aurélio at UFC Fight Night 13, but he was forced to withdraw due to a shoulder injury. With his shoulder healed, Fisher was next scheduled to fight young up and comer Jeremy Stephens at The Ultimate Fighter: Team Rampage vs. Team Forrest Finale on June 21, 2008. Fisher dominated Stephens and won by unanimous decision.

Fisher defeated Shannon Gugerty by submission due to a triangle choke at UFC 90 in Chicago on October 25, 2008. This fight earned him a $65,000 Submission of the Night award.

Fisher won his fight at UFC 99 via unanimous decision defeating veteran Caol Uno. Fisher lost to Joe Stevenson at UFC 104 by submission (elbow strikes) in the second round.

Fisher was scheduled to face vicious striker Duane Ludwig on March 21, 2010 at UFC LIVE: Vera vs. Jones, but Fisher was forced off the card with an injury. Ludwig faced UFC newcomer Darren Elkins instead.

Fisher faced Dennis Siver on June 19, 2010 at The Ultimate Fighter: Team Liddell vs. Team Ortiz Finale. He lost the fight via unanimous decision.

Fisher's next fight was against UFC newcomer Curt Warburton on October 16, 2010 at UFC 120. He won the fight via unanimous decision.

Fisher faced Ross Pearson on February 27, 2011 at UFC 127. He lost the fight via unanimous decision.

Fisher then faced Thiago Tavares on August 27, 2011 at UFC 134. He lost via TKO at 2:51 of round 2.

Fisher faced Sam Stout for the third time on June 22, 2012 at UFC on FX 4. He lost the fight via unanimous decision. Both participants earned Fight of the Night honors for their performances.

Following his loss to Stout, Fisher announced he would be retiring from MMA.

Fisher decided against retirement and was expected to face Yves Edwards on July 27, 2013 at UFC on Fox 8. However, on July 11, Fisher was removed from the bout due to injury and replaced by Daron Cruickshank. It was later revealed that Fisher was suffering from chronic traumatic encephalopathy, which was likely a direct result of multiple concussive head injuries sustained from his career as a mixed martial artist. Neurological doctors examining Fisher identified that he was unable to hop on one foot, and was incapable of tandem walking. He was advised to retire from fighting immediately.

Fisher was rendered unable to perform basic daily tasks as a result of the traumatic brain injuries that he had sustained, and suffered from headaches, forgetfulness, depression and extreme dizzy spells on a daily basis following his retirement. He and his family considered taking legal action against the UFC on the basis that his injuries were likely a direct result of his career with the organization, but elected not to do so. The UFC continued to pay him $5,000 per month until April 2017, at which point it was decided that his independent contractor agreement with the company was not to be renewed due to a planned reduction of business expenses following the Company's recent $4 billion takeover. Fisher's wife Emily was forced to leave full-time employment to care for him, and Fisher now relies on coaching MMA classes in a local gym.

The issues faced by Fisher in living with his injuries following retirement gained increased attention in January 2021, following the release of an article about Fisher by the website MMA Fighting. UFC President Dana White, when responding to questions regarding Fisher's condition ahead of UFC Fight Island 7, stated that "he’s not the first and he’s definitely not going to be the last (to suffer neurological injuries as a result of a career in combat sports). This is a contact sport and anybody who’s done this younger, myself included, is dealing with brain issues. It’s part of the gig." Welterweight fighter Matt Brown, responding to the article in question, also stated that he had suffered similar symptoms throughout his career, and acknowledged that this was a real risk faced by fighters who take considerable damage during their careers.

== Personal life ==
Fisher is married to female former mixed martial arts fighter Emily Fisher. The couple has three daughters.

Fisher owns and operates Glory Martial Arts Fitness, a gym in Sylva, North Carolina.

He was inducted into the Jackson County Athletic Hall of Fame in 2025.

== Championships and accomplishments ==
- Ultimate Fighting Championship
  - Fight of the Night (Three times) vs. Hermes França and Sam Stout 2 & 3
  - Submission of the Night (One time) vs. Shannon Gugerty
  - UFC Encyclopedia Awards
    - Fight of the Night (One time) vs. Matt Wiman
  - UFC.com Awards
    - 2006: Ranked #10 Fight of the Year vs. Sam Stout 1 (Tied with Drew McFedries vs. Alessio Sakara)
    - 2007: Half-Year Awards: Best Fight of the 1HY & Ranked #5 Fight of the Year vs. Sam Stout 2

== Mixed martial arts record ==
Professional record breakdown
33 matches	24 wins	9 losses
By knockout	10	3
By submission	9	0
By decision	5	6

Res.	Record	Opponent	Method	Event	Date	Round	Time	Location	Notes
Loss	24–9	Sam Stout	Decision (unanimous)	UFC on FX: Maynard vs. Guida	June 22, 2012	3	5:00	Atlantic City, New Jersey, United States	Fight of the Night.
Loss	24–8	Thiago Tavares	TKO (punches)	UFC 134	August 27, 2011	2	2:51	Rio de Janeiro, Brazil	
Loss	24–7	Ross Pearson	Decision (unanimous)	UFC 127	February 27, 2011	3	5:00	Sydney, Australia	
Win	24–6	Curt Warburton	Decision (unanimous)	UFC 120	October 16, 2010	3	5:00	London, England	
Loss	23–6	Dennis Siver	Decision (unanimous)	The Ultimate Fighter 11 Finale	June 19, 2010	3	5:00	Las Vegas, Nevada, United States	
Loss	23–5	Joe Stevenson	TKO (submission to elbows)	UFC 104	October 24, 2009	2	4:03	Los Angeles, California, United States	
Win	23–4	Caol Uno	Decision (unanimous)	UFC 99	June 13, 2009	3	5:00	Cologne, Germany	
Win	22–4	Shannon Gugerty	Submission (triangle choke)	UFC 90	October 25, 2008	3	3:56	Rosemont, Illinois, United States	Submission of the Night.
Win	21–4	Jeremy Stephens	Decision (unanimous)	The Ultimate Fighter: Team Rampage vs Team Forrest Finale	June 21, 2008	3	5:00	Las Vegas, Nevada, United States	
Loss	20–4	Frankie Edgar	Decision (unanimous)	UFC 78	November 17, 2007	3	5:00	Newark, New Jersey, United States	
Win	20–3	Sam Stout	Decision (unanimous)	UFC Fight Night: Stout vs. Fisher	June 12, 2007	3	5:00	Hollywood, Florida, United States	Fight of the Night.
Loss	19–3	Hermes França	TKO (punches)	UFC Fight Night: Evans vs. Salmon	January 25, 2007	2	4:03	Hollywood, Florida, United States	Fight of the Night.
Win	19–2	Dan Lauzon	TKO (punches)	UFC 64: Unstoppable	October 14, 2006	1	4:38	Las Vegas, Nevada, United States	
Win	18–2	Matt Wiman	KO (flying knee)	UFC 60: Hughes vs. Gracie	May 27, 2006	2	1:43	Los Angeles, California, United States	
Loss	17–2	Sam Stout	Decision (split)	UFC 58: USA vs. Canada	March 4, 2006	3	5:00	Las Vegas, Nevada, United States	
Win	17–1	Randy Hauer	Submission (triangle choke)	Battle at the Boardwalk (Day 1)	February 17, 2006	1	4:18	Atlantic City, New Jersey, United States	Return to Lightweight.
Win	16–1	Aaron Riley	TKO (doctor stoppage)	UFC Fight Night 3	January 16, 2006	1	5:00	Las Vegas, Nevada, United States	
Win	15–1	Thiago Alves	Submission (triangle choke)	UFC Ultimate Fight Night 2	October 3, 2005	2	4:43	Las Vegas, Nevada, United States	Return to Welterweight.
Win	14–1	Henry Matamoros	TKO (punches)	SuperBrawl 40	April 30, 2005	1	2:48	Hammond, Indiana, United States	
Win	13–1	Kyle Watson	KO (punch)	Courage Fighting Championships 2	March 26, 2005	1	0:33	Decatur, Illinois, United States	Lightweight debut.
Win	12–1	Tim Means	Submission (triangle choke)	IFC: Eve Of Destruction	March 5, 2005	1	1:44	Salt Lake City, Utah, United States	
Win	11–1	John Strawn	Submission (triangle choke)	VFC 8: Fallout	November 27, 2004	2	3:32	Council Bluffs, Iowa, United States	
Win	10–1	Shawn McCully	KO (punches)	Xtreme Kage Kombat	August 7, 2004	1	1:42	Des Moines, Iowa, United States	
Loss	9–1	Carlo Prater	Decision (unanimous)	Freestyle Fighting Championships 9	May 14, 2004	3	5:00	Biloxi, Mississippi, United States	
Win	9–0	Josh Neer	Decision (split)	VFC 7: Showdown	March 6, 2004	5	5:00	Council Bluffs, Iowa, United States	
Win	8–0	Eddy Ellis	Submission (armbar)	IFC: Battleground Tahoe	January 31, 2004	2	3:10	Lake Tahoe, Nevada, United States	
Win	7–0	Daryl Guthmiller	Submission (armbar)	ICC 2: Rebellion	April 18, 2003	2	2:45	Minneapolis, Minnesota, United States	Return to Welterweight.
Win	6–0	Kurt Illeman	KO (punch)	Extreme Challenge 49	February 8, 2003	1	1:42	Davenport, Iowa, United States	
Win	5–0	Jonathan Spears	TKO (punches)	Tuesday Night Fights	December 17, 2002	1	1:02	Davenport, Iowa, United States	Middleweight debut.
Win	4–0	Adam Copenhaver	TKO (punches)	VFC 3: Total Chaos	November 23, 2002	1	3:54	Council Bluffs, Iowa, United States	
Win	3–0	Tim Palmer	TKO (punches)	VFC 3: Total Chaos	November 23, 2002	1	0:57	Council Bluffs, Iowa, United States	
Win	2–0	Dave Gries	Submission (rear-naked choke)	VFC 3: Total Chaos	November 23, 2002	1	4:28	Council Bluffs, Iowa, United States	
Win	1–0	Ryan Heckert	Submission (armbar)	VFC 2: Bragging Rights	August 17, 2002	1	2:54	Council Bluffs, Iowa, United States	

== See also ==
- List of current UFC fighters
- List of male mixed martial artists
