= Reese Andy =

American mixed martial arts fighter (born 1973)

- Born: March 31, 1973 (age 53); Minot, North Dakota, United States
- Other names: Riptide
- Nationality: American
- Height: 6 ft 0 in (1.83 m)
- Weight: 205 lb (93 kg; 14.6 st)
- Division: Heavyweight; Light Heavyweight; Middleweight
- Fighting out of: Auburn, Washington, United States
- Team: West Coast Fight Team; AMC Pankration (formerly).
- Wrestling: NCAA Division I All-American Wrestler
- Years active: 2005-2008

Mixed martial arts record
- Total: 10
- Wins: 7
- By knockout: 1
- By submission: 2
- By decision: 4
- Losses: 3
- By knockout: 2
- By decision: 1

Other information
- Mixed martial arts record from Sherdog

Reese Paul Andy (born March 31, 1973) is a retired American mixed martial artist. A professional from 2005 until 2008, he fought in the UFC and was a member of the Seattle Tiger Sharks in the IFL.

== Background ==
Andy grew up in a family of four brothers, all of whom were All-American wrestlers. He started organized wrestling in the sixth grade, and went on to become a three-time 4-A state champion at Skyview High School in Billings, Montana. He also earned a bronze medal in the 1991 Greco-Roman Junior World Championships and participated in the 1993 World Espoir Greco-Roman Championships.

== Wrestling career ==
Andy wrestled in the 177-pound division for the Wyoming Cowboys from 1994 to 1996. He earned All-America honors in each of his three seasons, finishing sixth nationally at his weight in 1995 and second in 1994 and '96. He finished his collegiate career ranked seventh in school history with 110 career wins and seventh with 38 wins in a single season (1996). He was inducted into the Wyoming Athletics Hall of Fame in 2004.

NCAA Division 1

- 1994 – 177 lbs, 2nd
- 1995 – 177 lbs, 6th
- 1996 – 177 lbs, 2nd

== ADCC grappling ==
Andy was a competitor at both the 2003 and 2005 ADCC Submission Wrestling World Championship. In 2003, he won one and lost one match in both the -88 kg division and absolute divisions. In 2005, he won one and lost one match in the -88 kg division and lost his only bout in the absolute division.

== Mixed martial arts career ==
=== Early career ===
Andy began training in mixed martial arts in 2000 after seeing the success college wrestlers were having in the sport. He turned pro in 2005, winning two fights with the Superbrawl promotion in Hawaii before being signed by the upstart International Fight League.

=== International Fight League ===
Andy recorded a 5–1 record in six bouts with the IFL, posting his first career loss against fellow collegiate wrestler Aaron Stark. He fought in the main event of IFL: Everett on June 1, 2007, vs. Krzysztof Soszynski. Despite coming in just over the heavyweight minimum at 208 pounds, he defeated the much larger and more experienced Soszynski via split decision.

=== Ultimate Fighting Championship ===
After his victory over Soszynski, Andy signed a contract with the UFC. He made his UFC debut losing to Brandon Vera via unanimous decision at UFC: Silva vs. Irvin in Las Vegas, Nevada on July 19, 2008.

Andy lost to Matt Hamill via TKO in the second round at UFC 92 on December 27, 2008.

Following his loss to Hamill, Andy was cut from the UFC.

== Personal life ==
Currently, Andy runs his own gym and teaches MMA classes at West Coast Fight Team in Auburn, Washington.

== Mixed martial arts record ==
Professional record breakdown
10 matches	7 wins	3 losses
By knockout	1	2
By submission	2	0
By decision	4	1

Res.	Record	Opponent	Method	Event	Date	Round	Time	Location	Notes
Loss	7–3	Matt Hamill	TKO (punches)	UFC 92	December 27, 2008	2	2:19	Las Vegas, Nevada, United States	
Loss	7–2	Brandon Vera	Decision (unanimous)	UFC Fight Night: Silva vs. Irvin	July 19, 2008	3	5:00	Las Vegas, Nevada, United States	
Win	7–1	Krzysztof Soszynski	Decision (split)	IFL: Everett	June 1, 2007	3	4:00	Everett, Washington, United States	Heavyweight bout.
Win	6–1	Adam Maciejewski	Submission (rear-naked choke)	IFL: Moline	April 7, 2007	2	3:11	Moline, Illinois, United States	Heavyweight bout.
Win	5–1	Justin Levens	Decision (unanimous)	IFL: Oakland	January 19, 2007	3	4:00	Oakland, California, United States	
Win	4–1	Jamal Patterson	TKO (punches)	IFL: Championship Final	December 29, 2006	2	3:24	Uncasville, Connecticut, United States	
Loss	3–1	Aaron Stark	TKO (punches)	IFL: Portland	September 9, 2006	3	2:00	Portland, Oregon, United States	
Win	3–0	Mike Ciesnolevicz	Decision (split)	IFL: Championship 2006	June 3, 2006	3	4:00	Atlantic City, New Jersey, United States	Return to Light Heavyweight.
Win	2–0	Trevor Garrett	Submission (rear-naked choke)	Superbrawl: Icon	July 23, 2005	1	4:15	Honolulu, Hawaii, United States	Middleweight debut.
Win	1–0	Kala Hose	Decision (unanimous)	Superbrawl 39	April 9, 2005	3	5:00	Honolulu, Hawaii, United States	
