= Dale Hartt =

American martial artist

- Born: April 4, 1979 (age 47); Bangor, Maine, United States
- Other names: The Demon
- Height: 5 ft 10 in (1.78 m)
- Weight: 155 lb (70 kg; 11.1 st)
- Division: Lightweight
- Reach: 69.0 in (175 cm)
- Fighting out of: Las Vegas, Nevada, United States
- Team: Team Sityodtong Boston
- Years active: 2004–2010 (MMA)

Mixed martial arts record
- Total: 9
- Wins: 6
- By knockout: 4
- By submission: 2
- Losses: 3
- By knockout: 1
- By submission: 2

Other information
- Mixed martial arts record from Sherdog

Dale Edward Hartt (born April 4, 1979) is an American mixed martial artist, who is perhaps best known for his three fight stint in the Lightweight division of the Ultimate Fighting Championship.

== Mixed martial arts career ==
Hartt made his professional mixed martial arts debut on December 11, 2004, when he faced Gary Bonenfant at Mass Destruction 18. He won the fight via first round submission. Following this win, Hartt would compile an undefeated record of 5–0 before being signed by the Ultimate Fighting Championship in mid-2008.

=== Ultimate Fighting Championship ===
With an undefeated 5–0 record, Hartt signed with the UFC in June 2008. Hartt made his debut against fellow newcomer Shannon Gugerty at UFC Fight Night: Silva vs. Irvin on July 19, 2008. He lost the fight via rear-naked choke. In his second fight with the promotion, Hartt faced Corey Hill at UFC: Fight for the Troops on December 10, 2008. Hartt won the fight via TKO, after Hill broke his leg throwing a kick.

Hartt then faced Dennis Siver at UFC 99 on June 13, 2009. He lost the fight via rear-naked choke, and after dropping to 1–2 in the UFC, was released from the promotion.

=== Post-UFC career ===
In his first fight after being released from UFC, Hartt faced Guillaume DeLorenzi at Ringside MMA: No Escape on June 18, 2010. He lost the fight via shoulder injury TKO.

== Personal life ==
Dale has two children and now works in finance. After fighting he returned to university and graduated with a degree in finance and management from the University of Maine magna cum laude. Dale still enjoys training and the occasional grappling competition.

== Mixed martial arts record ==
Professional record breakdown
9 matches	6 wins	3 losses
By knockout	4	1
By submission	2	2

Res.	Record	Opponent	Method	Event	Date	Round	Time	Location	Notes
Loss	6–3	Guillaume DeLorenzi	TKO (shoulder injury)	Ringside MMA: No Escape	June 18, 2010	2	0:49	Centre Pierre-Charbonneau, Montreal, Quebec, Canada	For the Ringside MMA Lightweight Championship.
Loss	6–2	Dennis Siver	Submission (rear-naked choke)	UFC 99	June 13, 2009	1	3:23	Cologne, Germany	
Win	6–1	Corey Hill	TKO (leg fracture)	UFC: Fight for the Troops	December 10, 2008	2	0:20	Fayetteville, North Carolina, United States	
Loss	5–1	Shannon Gugerty	Submission (rear-naked choke)	UFC Fight Night: Silva vs. Irvin	July 19, 2008	1	3:33	Las Vegas, Nevada, United States	Lightweight debut.
Win	5–0	Keith Ferreira	Submission (strikes)	FFP: Untamed 19	March 15, 2008	1	1:35	Plymouth, Massachusetts, United States	
Win	4–0	Matt Lee	KO	FFP: Untamed 11	March 30, 2007	2	N/A	Massachusetts, United States	
Win	3–0	Pat Shaw	TKO	FFP: Untamed 6	July 16, 2006	2	1:17	Brockton, Massachusetts, United States	
Win	2–0	Wesley Welch	TKO	RITR 11: Rumble in the Ring 11	June 11, 2005	2	1:48	Auburn, Washington, United States	
Win	1–0	Gary Bonenfant	Submission	MD 18: Mass Destruction 18	December 11, 2004	1	N/A	Boston, Massachusetts, United States	
