= Day Zero (2022 film) =

2022 Zombie thriller film

- Official release poster
- Directed by: Joey De Guzman; Agung Gede
- Written by: Ays De Guzman
- Produced by: Erik Matti; Ronald Stephen Monteverde; Roselle Y. Monteverde
- Starring: Brandon Vera; Pepe Herrera; Mary Jean Lastimosa
- Cinematography: Moises Zee
- Edited by: Joey De Guzman; Brian Gonzalez
- Music by: Malek Lopez; Erwin Romulo
- Production companies: Reality MM Studios; Regal Entertainment
- Distributed by: Well Go USA Entertainment; Kinolosgistika; Art House Productions; Disruptor Media; Lighthouse Home Entertainment
- Release dates: 2 July 2022 (NIFFF); 22 September 2026
- Running time: 82 minutes
- Country: Philippines
- Language: Filipino

Day Zero is a 2022 Philippine action zombie film written by Ays De Guzman and directed by Joey De Guzman and Agung Gede. It stars Brandon Vera, Pepe Herrera and Mary Jean Lastimosa.

== Plot ==
Emon, has spent the last few years in prison for serious assault. Emon is a former US special forces soldier and has apparently been a model prisoner so has won his parole and is hoping to return home to his wife Sheryl, and daughter Jane, who is deaf, but his hopes are dashed when he's surrounded by other prisoners who attack him when he sticks up for his timid friend Timoy at which point his release is cancelled. As it turns out, that doesn't matter very much because of an outbreak of suspected Dengue fever which has mutated causing corpses to come back to life and attack people. The warden apparently had a moment of compassion before becoming a zombie and opened the gates telling the prisoners to escape and allowing Emon and Timoy to try to make their way back to Sheryl and Jane.

Emon must reclaim his role as a father by becoming a man who can protect his family even if it's true that it's the same self-destructive forces, his capacity for violence, which enable him to do so. Even the warden had remarked on Emon's intimidating physicality admitting that it's unsurprising the other inmates largely leave him alone while his attempt to impress Sheryl by telling her how some guys hassling Timoy had walked away when they saw him coming backfires as she sees it as evidence that he really hasn't changed and is still wedded to a destructive code of masculinity founded on dominance and violence. The implications of the fact he learned these skills as a member of the US military otherwise goes largely uncritiqued as does the presence of heavy weaponry including an assault rifle in the home of a local police officer.

Police chief Oscar later becomes a secondary enemy after turning on some of the other survivors when someone close to him is zombified though it's Sheryl, not Emon, who must eventually contend with him. The two men present conflicting visions of fatherhood, one protective and the vengeful prepared to kill a child just to get revenge against her father. In any case, Emon must learn to channel his violence in a more positive direction by killing as many of the zombified locals as possible to clear a path for Sheryl and Jane to escape the apartment building where the family have become trapped. Though he may eventually be able to reclaim his paternity, it's also true the problematic violence that allows him to do so may prevent him from reintegrating into his family in a more “normal” post-outbreak world.

== Cast ==
- Brandon Vera as Emon
- Pepe Herrera as Timoy
- Mary Jean Lastimosa as Sheryl
- Joey Marquez as Oscar
- Freya Fury Montierro as Jane
- Yohance Levi Buie as David
- Ricci Rivero as Paolo
- Jema Galanza as Hazel
- Shermaine Santiago as Frida
- Jovit Moya as Jovit
- James Lomahan as Peter
- Aileen Sahibad as Linda
- Jack Falcis as Neighbor
- Evangeline Torcino as Neighbor
- Bongjon Jose as Neighbor
- Jordan Castillo as Mortician
- Lao Rodriguez as Warden

== Production ==
In an interview Brandon Vera said that they shoot the film when the COVID-19 pandemic in the Philippines has started.

He said:

Man, we shot that during COVID. And it was about a virus that turns people into zombies. So the timing of it was, you know kinda perfect. It was a really cool shoot, I worked with an amazing young director.

“I worked with a crazy crazy stuntman crew. They were so good that they made me wanna [step] up my game even more. We started drilling on set so many more times than necessary. These guys could do amazing things. My favorite part about this film, it’s a zombie film, yes everybody knows about zombie films but this one’s different.”

== Release ==
The film was premiered at Neuchâtel International Fantastic Film Festival on July 3, 2022, Toronto After Dark Film Festival on October 21, 2022, Obscura Film Festival Berlin on October 22, 2022, and Imagine Film Festival on October 28, 2022.

It was released worldwide at Amazon Prime Video on September 28, 2022.

== Reception ==
Peter Martin of Screen Anarchy gave the film a positive feedback and wrote; De Guzman balances the movie on a seesaw, whipping through action sequences and then pausing for dramatic scenes, allowing father and daughter to connect through sign language as they dodge zombies left and right.

Don Anelli of Asian Movie Pulse gave the film a mixed review and said: Wholly enjoyable as an action/horror hybrid, “Day Zero” is a serviceable genre effort that doesn't have too many issues and is a perfect vehicle for its main star to emerge as the action hero he's presented to be. Give it a look if you're a fan of these kinds of genre hybrids, are a big zombie genre fanatic, or appreciate Asian horror.

Andrew Heskins of EasternKicks gave the film 3 star out of 5 star and said: It's unclear whether the title Day Zero is a statement of intent – though I'm not sure where it would go next – or just a desperate attempt to get a day (the curse of Romero again!) and a ‘Z’ in there. It really doesn't seem to relate to the period the film takes place in, which might have been a good angle. Ultimately, it's a solid genre film that doesn't take up too much of your time, and has some great action sequences, but it really doesn't bring anything new to the genre.

=== Accolades ===
Year	Awards	Category	Recipient	Result	Ref.
2022	Obscura Film Festival	Best Feature Film	Day Zero	Won	
