= Hermes França =

Brazilian mixed martial arts fighter

Hermes França Barros
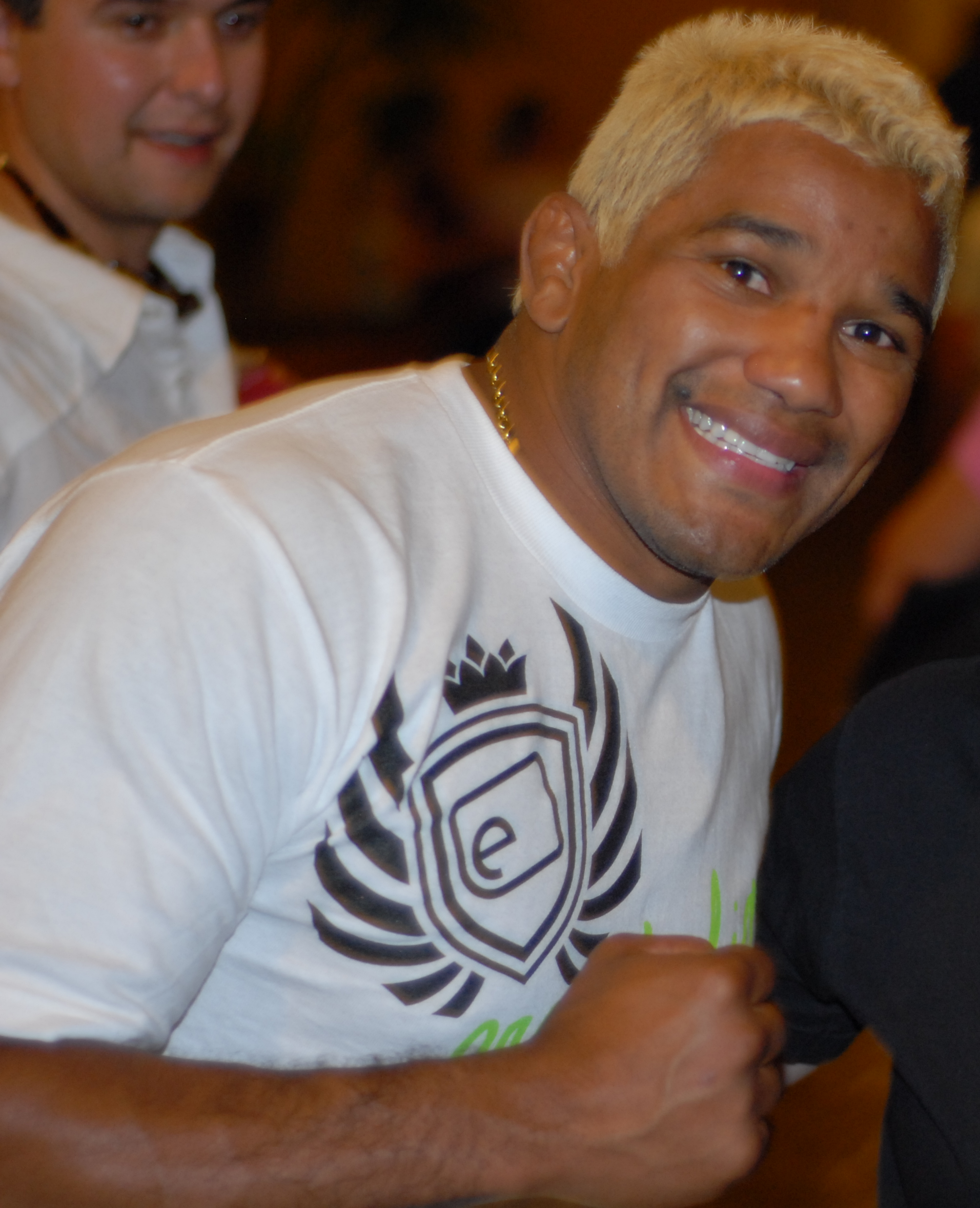
- Born: August 26, 1974 (age 52); Fortaleza, Brazil
- Occupation: Fighter
- Status: Completed his prison sentence and deported to Brazil in April 2014
- Convictions: One count of unlawful penetration, one count of 1st degree sexual abuse.
- Penalty: 42 months in state prison

Hermes França
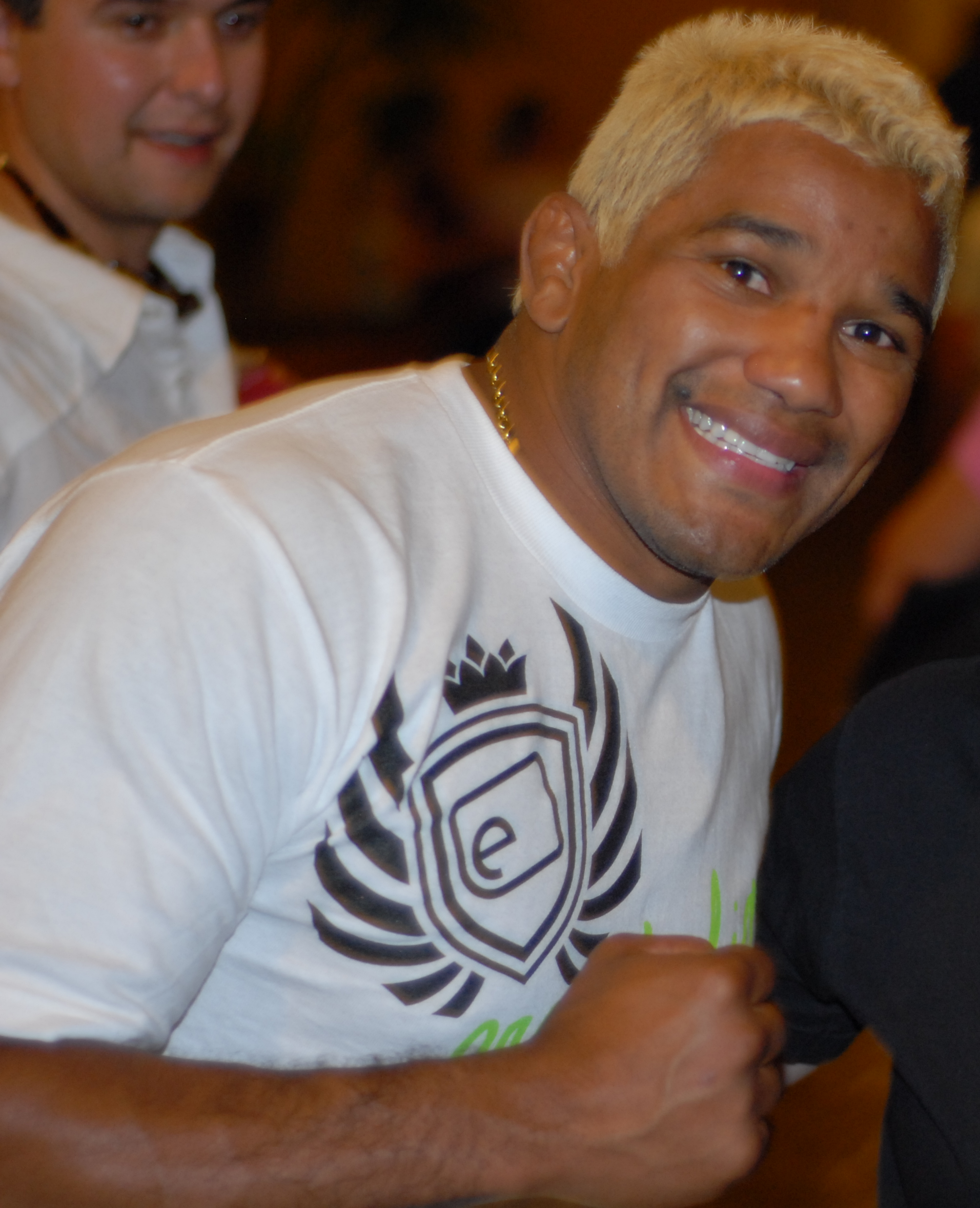
- Born: August 26, 1974 (age 52); Fortaleza, Brazil
- Nationality: Brazil
- Height: 5 ft 6 in (1.68 m)
- Weight: 170 lb (77 kg; 12 st)
- Division: Lightweight
- Reach: 70 1/2 in (179 cm)
- Fighting out of: Jupiter, Florida, USA
- Team: Team Hermes Franca
- Rank: Black belt in BJJ
- Years active: 2001–2011, 2014–2019

Mixed martial arts record
- Total: 47
- Wins: 26
- By knockout: 8
- By submission: 15
- By decision: 3
- Losses: 20
- By knockout: 10
- By decision: 10
- No contests: 1

Other information
- Mixed martial arts record from Sherdog

Hermes França Barros (Portuguese pronunciation: [ˈeʁmis ˈfɾɐ̃sɐ]; born August 26, 1974) is a Brazilian mixed martial artist. He has competed for the UFC, WEC, MFC, and Israel FC. He is a former WEC Lightweight Champion, and former UFC Lightweight Championship contender.

== Mixed martial arts career ==
=== Early career ===
França made his professional Mixed Martial Arts debut on 17 November 2001, with a win over future WEC Featherweight Champion Mike Brown. He quickly earned an undefeated streak of 6–0, finishing all his opponents under the limit of the second round, drawing the attention of the UFC.

=== First UFC run ===
França made his UFC debut at UFC 42, defeating Richard Crunkilton by unanimous decision. He won his next UFC fight against Caol Uno (who narrowly missed the lightweight championship after drawing with B.J. Penn) at UFC 44 before losing a majority decision to Josh Thomson at UFC 46.

His next outing in the UFC, against Yves Edwards, was unsuccessful, losing the fight by split decision. Edwards would once again beat França by split decision in their encounter at Euphoria: USA vs. World in 2005, starting what would be a very bad year – marked with three straight losses – for the Brazilian fighter.

=== After UFC release ===
However, 2006 would prove to be a much better year for França. In March, he toppled WEC champion Gabe Ruediger to capture the WEC Lightweight championship and then knocked out Team Quest fighter Ryan Schultz to take the AFC Lightweight championship in April.

França continued his winning streak against the likes of Toby Imada and Brandon Olsen before signing a contract to fight Roger Huerta at UFC 61 in July. Although França's opponent was changed – Huerta pulled out due to injury, with UFC newcomer Joe Jordan taking his place – França still reigned successful in his UFC return, stopping Jordan by triangle choke submission in the third round.

=== Second UFC run ===
On August 4, 2006, it was revealed that França had accepted a late-notice fight with Jamie Varner at UFC 62. França came in as a late replacement for Spencer Fisher, who injured his back while preparing for the fight. Despite accepting the fight on short notice, França reigned victorious, catching Varner in an armbar submission in the third round.

França successfully defended his WEC Lightweight championship against Nathan Diaz, brother of UFC veteran Nick Diaz, at WEC 24 on October 12, extending França's win streak in 2006 to seven consecutive victories.

França won his fight against Spencer Fisher at UFC Fight Night 8 by TKO in the second round; after his victory he got down on his knees (à la Georges St-Pierre) and begged UFC President Dana White to grant him a title shot against Sean Sherk. During the post-fight press conference White confirmed that França would be given a title shot at UFC 73. França lost to Sean Sherk by unanimous decision. On July 19, 2007, the California State Athletic Commission announced França had tested positive for the banned steroid Drostanolone in a post-fight drug test following his championship fight at UFC 73. He had been suspended from competing in California until July 5, 2008, and had been fined $2,500.

He has since left The Armory and was then removed from their main site as an instructor.

Franca spent early January 2008 helping BJ Penn train for his five-round fight against Joe Stevenson for the vacant UFC lightweight championship at UFC 80.

França lost his first fight in the UFC since his suspension in 2007 on July 19, 2008, to Frankie Edgar via unanimous decision.

He then defeated Marcus Aurélio via unanimous decision at UFC 90 on October 25, 2008.

França was scheduled to fight Joe Lauzon on February 7 in the main event for UFC Fight Night 17. However, França pulled out of the event with a torn anterior crucial ligament in his right knee. França made his return against Tyson Griffin on September 19, 2009, at UFC 103. Franca lost his fight to Tyson Griffin in the second round via TKO (Punches) after Griffin caught him with a straight right followed up by brutal ground and pound, eventually knocking out França for his second ever KO loss.

After his defeat at the hands of Tyson Griffin at UFC 103, França was released by the organization, along with other UFC veterans, Chris Wilson, Marcus Aurélio and Justin McCully.

=== After second UFC release ===
Following the loss to Eric Wisely and losing four out of his last five fights, Franca announced through his manager, Reed Wallace, his retirement.

Franca has since come out of retirement and has bounced back after an 0-3-1 record in four fights during 2010. Franca won via submission in February 2011 then scored two wins in April 2011 defeating Robert Washington and Josh Thorpe.

=== Xtreme Vale Todo 5 controversy ===
At the Xtreme Vale Todo 5 event in Costa Rica on December 19, 2010, Hermes Franca was awarded a judges' decision over Ferrid Kheder before the promoter, Lu Dwyer, attempted to overturn it, causing widespread controversy. In addition to the fight's announcer, all three judges and the referee had scored the bout in favor of Franca. Regardless of the actual scores, Lu Dwyer declared Kheder the victor, and another promoter raised Kheder's hand in victory after the referee refused to do so.

There is a potential conflict of interest because Kheder is primarily sponsored by Dwyer and her business J & L Irrigation. Dwyer sponsors "Team FK" by paying his living expenses and taking a percentage of his winnings.

Days after his controversial decision win, Ferrid Kheder posted on his Facebook page that Dwyer decided to overturn the fight result to a "No Contest" and suggested a five-round rematch, presumably in the same promotion.

=== Return to MMA ===
Following his arrest and deportation to Brazil, Franca returned from a three-year retirement and faced Marcio Breno at Extreme Fighter: Nordeste on August 28, 2014. He lost the bout via first-round knockout.

== Personal life ==
Franca and his wife have one son. Franca lost his father when he was 14.

Franca was scheduled to fight Drew Fickett for the MFC's vacant lightweight championship at MFC 30 on June 10, 2011. Franca, however, turned himself in to Clackamas County Sheriff's officials in mid-May 2011 and was charged with multiple sexual battery charges. This was related to him sexually abusing a minor who was a student at his training facility in Clackamas, Oregon. MFC president Mark Pavelich then terminated Franca's contract on May 19, 2011, citing the arrest and Franca having fought two times outside of the organization, breaching his contract.

Franca pleaded guilty to one count of attempted unlawful penetration and was sentenced to 42 months in state prison; he was also sentenced to four and a half years probation after serving his prison sentence and had to register as a sex offender.

== Championships and accomplishments ==
=== Mixed martial arts ===
- World Extreme Cagefighting
  - WEC Lightweight Champion (One time; third)
    - Two successful title defenses
  - Tied (Jamie Varner; Gabe Ruediger) for most consecutive successful defenses in the Lightweight division
  - Tied (Jamie Varner; Gabe Ruediger) for most successful defenses in the Lightweight division
- Ultimate Fighting Championship
  - Fight of the Night (Three times) vs. Jamie Varner, Spencer Fisher and Frankie Edgar
  - Submission of the Night (One time) vs. Joe Jordan
  - UFC.com Awards
    - 2006: Ranked #6 Submission of the Year vs. Jamie Varner
- HOOKnSHOOT
  - HnS Featherweight Champion (One time)

== Mixed martial arts record ==
Professional record breakdown
47 matches	26 wins	20 losses
By knockout	8	10
By submission	15	0
By decision	3	10
No contests	1	

Res.	Record	Opponent	Method	Event	Date	Round	Time	Location	Notes
Loss	26–20 (1)	Vaso Bakočević	TKO (punches)	Megdan Fighting 4 - Selected	March 15, 2019	1	1:45	Novi Sad, Serbia	
Loss	26–19 (1)	Rafael da Silva Cordeiro	TKO (punches)	TSFBR 1 - Super Fight Brazil	November 10, 2018	1	2:36	Teresina, Piauí, Brazil	
Win	26–18 (1)	Roger Vieira	Submission (guillotine choke)	TWC 5 - The Warriors Combat 5	April 20, 2018	1	3:02	Brasília, Brazil	
Loss	25–18 (1)	Lionel Padilla Suarez	Decision (unanimous)	AFL 14 - Outbreak	March 10, 2018	3	5:00	Las Palmas, Canary Islands, Spain	
Win	25–17 (1)	Fozil Nuralizoda	TKO (doctor stoppage)	TFC 5 - Tajikistan Fighting Championship 5	October 17, 2017	1	3:18	Dushanbe, Tajikistan	
Win	24–17 (1)	Eduardo Andrade	Decision (unanimous)	Aspera Fighting Championship 53	June 10, 2017	3	5:00	Fortaleza, Ceará, Brazil	
Loss	23–17 (1)	Zhang Lipeng	Decision (unanimous)	Kunlun Fight MMA 9	February 17, 2017	3	5:00	Sanya, Hainan China	
Loss	23–16 (1)	Fanil Rafikov	KO (punches)	Akhmat Fight Show 12	December 16, 2015	1	1:14	Astana, Kazakhstan	
Loss	23–15 (1)	James Silveira	TKO (punches)	Action Fight 2	November 28, 2015	2	2:11	Caucaia, Ceará, Brazil	
Win	23–14 (1)	Khasan Askhabov	Submission (guillotine choke)	Battle in Grozny 5	August 22, 2015	2	2:37	Grozny, Chechnya, Russia	
Loss	22–14 (1)	Shamil Zavurov	KO (punch)	Grozny Fights 3	June 13, 2015	1	0:42	Grozny, Chechnya, Russia	
Loss	22–13 (1)	Márcio Breno	KO (punches)	Extreme Fighter: Nordeste	August 28, 2014	1	0:34	Fortaleza, Ceará, Brazil	
Loss	22–12 (1)	Thawa Ril	KO (punches)	International Fighter Championship	April 29, 2011	2	0:56	Pernambuco, Brazil	
Win	22–11 (1)	Josh Thorpe	Submission (rear-naked choke)	Gladiator Cage Fights - Knockout Night 1	April 23, 2011	1	1:36	Marion, Illinois, United States	
Win	21–11 (1)	Robert Washington	TKO (punches)	MFC 29: Conquer	April 8, 2011	2	0:26	Windsor, Ontario, Canada	
Win	20–11 (1)	Jorge Sarat	Submission (armbar)	GForce Promotions: Bad Blood 5	February 26, 2011	1	2:27	Grand Rapids, MI, United States	
NC	19–11 (1)	Ferrid Kheder	NC (overturned)	Xtreme Vale Todo 5	December 19, 2010	3	5:00	Cartago, Costa Rica	Originally a unanimous loss. Overturned to a no contest after miscalculation in scores.
Loss	19–11	Moshe Kaitz	Decision (unanimous)	Israel FC: Genesis	November 9, 2010	3	5:00	Tel Aviv, Israel	
Loss	19–10	Eric Wisely	Decision (unanimous)	Scorpius Fighting Championships 1	September 24, 2010	3	5:00	Fort Lauderdale, Florida, United States	
Loss	19–9	Eric Wisely	TKO (punches)	Max Fights DM Ballroom Brawl IV	January 8, 2010	1	2:03	West Des Moines, Iowa, United States	For the Max Fights DM Interim Lightweight Championship.
Loss	19–8	Tyson Griffin	KO (punches)	UFC 103	September 19, 2009	2	3:26	Dallas, Texas, United States	Catchweight (159 lb) bout; Franca missed weight.
Win	19–7	Marcus Aurélio	Decision (unanimous)	UFC 90	October 25, 2008	3	5:00	Rosemont, Illinois, United States	
Loss	18–7	Frankie Edgar	Decision (unanimous)	UFC Fight Night: Silva vs. Irvin	July 19, 2008	3	5:00	Las Vegas, Nevada, United States	Fight of the Night.
Loss	18–6	Sean Sherk	Decision (unanimous)	UFC 73	July 7, 2007	5	5:00	Sacramento, California, United States	For the UFC Lightweight Championship. Both fighters tested positive for banned substances in post-fight drug test.
Win	18–5	Spencer Fisher	TKO (punches)	UFC Fight Night 8	January 25, 2007	2	4:03	Hollywood, Florida, United States	Fight of the Night.
Win	17–5	Nate Diaz	Submission (armbar)	WEC 24: Full Force	October 12, 2006	2	2:46	Lemoore, California, United States	Defended the WEC Lightweight Championship. Later vacated title to fight in the UFC.
Win	16–5	Jamie Varner	Submission (armbar)	UFC 62: Liddell vs. Sobral	August 26, 2006	3	3:31	Las Vegas, Nevada, United States	Fight of the Night.
Win	15–5	Joe Jordan	Submission (triangle choke)	UFC 61: Bitter Rivals	July 8, 2006	3	0:47	Las Vegas, Nevada, United States	Submission of the Night.
Win	14–5	Brandon Olsen	Submission (armbar)	WEC 21: Tapout	June 15, 2006	1	0:40	Highland, California, United States	Defended the WEC Lightweight Championship.
Win	13–5	Toby Imada	Submission (armbar)	TC 14: Throwdown	May 13, 2006	1	0:53	Del Mar, California, United States	
Win	12–5	Ryan Schultz	KO (punches)	AFC 16: Absolute Fighting Championships 16	April 22, 2006	1	3:30	Fort Lauderdale, United States	
Win	11–5	Gabe Ruediger	KO (punches)	WEC 19: Undisputed	March 17, 2006	1	0:36	Lemoore, California, United States	Won the WEC Lightweight Championship.
Loss	10–5	Kotetsu Boku	Decision (majority)	Hero's 3	September 7, 2005	2	5:00	Tokyo, Japan	
Loss	10–4	Ray Cooper	KO (punches)	Shooto Hawaii: Unleashed	March 25, 2005	1	2:57	Honolulu, Hawaii, United States	
Loss	10–3	Yves Edwards	Decision (split)	Euphoria: USA vs World	February 26, 2005	3	5:00	Atlantic City, New Jersey, United States	
Win	10–2	Manny Reyes Jr.	KO (punches)	AFC 10: Absolute Fighting Championships 10	October 30, 2004	1	0:37	Fort Lauderdale, Florida, United States	
Win	9–2	Phil Johns	Submission (rear-naked choke)	Euphoria: Road to the Titles	October 15, 2004	1	0:47	Atlantic City, New Jersey, United States	
Loss	8–2	Yves Edwards	Decision (split)	UFC 47	April 2, 2004	3	5:00	Las Vegas, Nevada, United States	
Loss	8–1	Josh Thomson	Decision (unanimous)	UFC 46	January 31, 2004	3	5:00	Las Vegas, Nevada, United States	
Win	8–0	Caol Uno	KO (punch)	UFC 44	September 26, 2003	2	2:46	Las Vegas, Nevada, United States	
Win	7–0	Richard Crunkilton	Decision (unanimous)	UFC 42	April 25, 2003	3	5:00	Miami, Florida, United States	
Win	6–0	Ryan Diaz	Submission (guillotine choke)	HOOKnSHOOT: Absolute Fighting Championships	December 13, 2002	1	4:23	Fort Lauderdale, Florida, United States	Catchweight bout (150 lb).
Win	5–0	Anthony Hamlett	TKO (punches)	HOOKnSHOOT: New Wind	September 7, 2002	1	N/A	Evansville, Indiana, United States	Won HnS Featherweight Championship.
Win	4–0	Yohei Suzuki	Submission (guillotine choke)	HOOKnSHOOT: Relentless	May 25, 2002	1	1:04	Evansville, Indiana, United States	
Win	3–0	Don Kaecher	Submission (armbar)	WEF 12: World Extreme Fighting 12	May 11, 2002	2	2:00	Steubenville, Ohio, United States	
Win	2–0	Mike Willus	Submission (triangle choke)	HOOKnSHOOT: Overdrive	March 9, 2002	1	4:00	Evansville, Indiana, United States	
Win	1–0	Mike Brown	Submission (triangle choke)	HOOKnSHOOT: Kings 1	November 17, 2001	1	2:21	Evansville, Indiana, United States	

== See also ==
- List of male mixed martial artists

Awards and achievements
Preceded by Gabe Ruediger	3rd WEC Lightweight Championship; March 17, 2006 - December, 2006	Vacant title was vacated when Zuffa purchased WEC Title next held by Rob McCullough
