= Clay Guida =

American mixed martial artist (born 1981)

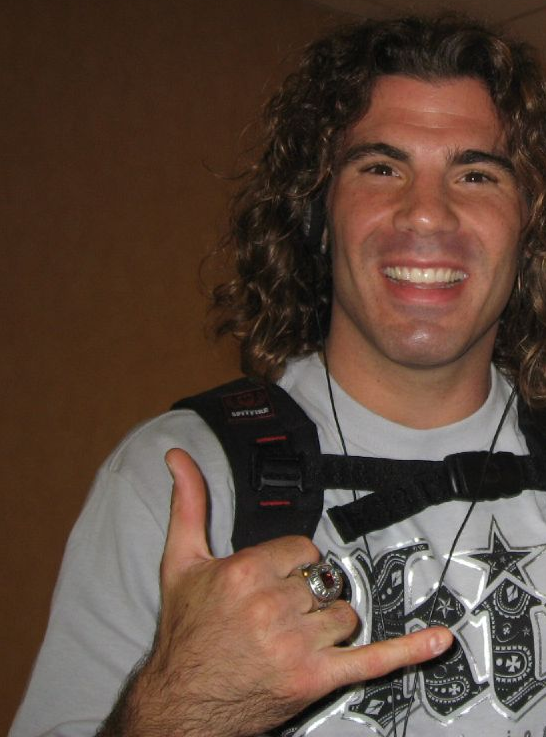
- Born: Clayton Charles Guida; December 8, 1981 (age 44); Round Lake, Illinois, United States
- Other names: The Carpenter
- Height: 5 ft 7 in (1.70 m)
- Weight: 155 lb (70 kg; 11 st 1 lb)
- Division: Lightweight (2003–2013, 2017–present); Featherweight (2013–2016)
- Reach: 70 in (178 cm)
- Stance: Orthodox
- Fighting out of: Johnsburg, Illinois, United States
- Team: Midwest Training Center (until 2009); Jackson-Wink MMA (2009–2015); Team Alpha Male (2015–present)
- Rank: black belt in brazilian jiu-jitsu black belt in Gaidojutsu
- Years active: 2003–present

Mixed martial arts record
- Total: 63
- Wins: 38
- By knockout: 7
- By submission: 14
- By decision: 16
- Unknown: 1
- Losses: 25
- By knockout: 2
- By submission: 12
- By decision: 10
- Unknown: 1

Other information
- University: William Rainey Harper College
- Notable relatives: Jason Guida (brother)
- Website: gillzandthrillzwithguida.com
- Mixed martial arts record from Sherdog

Clayton Charles Guida (/ˈɡwiːdə/; born December 8, 1981) is an American professional mixed martial artist, who competed in the UFC in the Lightweight division. A professional since 2003, Guida also formerly competed for Strikeforce, the WEC, King of the Cage, and Shooto. Guida was the inaugural Strikeforce Lightweight Champion.

== Background ==
Born and raised in Round Lake, Illinois into an Italian family, Guida began wrestling at the age of five and was a three-sport athlete at Johnsburg High School. He continued his wrestling career for Harper College, where he competed at 149 lbs. He is the younger brother of fellow mixed martial artist, Jason Guida.

== Mixed martial arts career ==
=== Early career ===
Guida made his professional debut in the summer of 2003, losing via rear-naked choke in the first round. After compiling a record of 3–3, he then won his next 15 consecutive fights before losing via submission at a King of the Cage event in February 2006. Guida was then signed by Strikeforce and fought a month later against Josh Thomson for the Strikeforce Lightweight Championship. Guida won via unanimous decision, before losing to the then-undefeated Gilbert Melendez. After losing his next bout overseas in Japan via submission, Guida was signed by Zuffa and the WEC, making his promotional debut at WEC 23. He won via unanimous decision. With an overall record of 20–6, Guida was signed by the UFC.

=== Ultimate Fighting Championship ===
Guida was successful in his UFC debut, submitting Justin James in the second round at UFC 64. The submission earned him the Submission of the Night award.

Guida lost a unanimous decision to Din Thomas at UFC Fight Night: Evans vs. Salmon in his second UFC outing.

Guida garnered attention for his three-round split decision loss to Tyson Griffin at UFC 72. Both fighters were awarded the Fight of the Night bonus.

At UFC 74 Guida rebounded from his two consecutive losses, taking a split decision over PRIDE veteran Marcus Aurélio.

Guida was defeated by Roger Huerta at The Ultimate Fighter 6 Finale via rear-naked choke in the 3rd round after clearly winning the first 2 rounds. Both fighters were awarded the Fight of the Night bonus.

Guida returned to his winning ways at UFC Fight Night 13, where he defeated UFC newcomer Samy Schiavo via TKO at 4:15 of the first round.

In a bout at UFC Fight Night 15, he defeated Mac Danzig via unanimous decision (30–27, 29–28, 29–28).

Guida defeated Ultimate Fighter winner Nate Diaz via split decision at UFC 94. Both fighters were awarded the Fight of the Night bonus.

His next fight was against Diego Sanchez, at The Ultimate Fighter: United States vs. United Kingdom Finale which he lost by split decision. The fight had a frantic pace in which Guida weathered a ferocious striking offensive from Sanchez, with a seemingly endless barrage of punches and a brutal headkick which dropped Guida in the first round. This bout went on to win Fight of the Night honors. The fight would later make #13 on the "100 Greatest UFC fights" list.

Despite his status as an up-and-coming UFC fighter he was not included in the UFC 2009 Undisputed video game due to technical issues caused by his long hair. He was even offered $10,000 by Dana White to cut it, but he refused.

On December 12, 2009, he fought Kenny Florian at UFC 107. In the second round of a bloody fight, Guida was dropped by a right hand and lost via rear-naked choke.

Guida was expected to face Sean Sherk on March 21, 2010, at UFC LIVE: Vera vs. Jones, but Sherk was forced off the card with an injury. Shannon Gugerty stepped up to become Guida's new opponent on the preliminary section of the event. At UFC Live: Vera vs. Jones Guida defeated Shannon Gugerty at 3:40 of round 2 by way of arm-triangle choke, ending Guida's two fight losing streak along with winning his first UFC Submission of the Night award.

Guida then faced Rafael dos Anjos on August 7, 2010, at UFC 117. Guida appeared to injure the jaw of dos Anjos in the first round with a hook and would go on to defeat dos Anjos by submission (jaw injury) after dos Anjos tapped from the pressure being applied to his jaw while Guida had head-and-arm control.

Guida defeated Takanori Gomi on January 1, 2011, at UFC 125 by submission due to a guillotine choke in round two, his third consecutive submission victory which also earned him Submission of the Night honors.

Guida next defeated former #1 Lightweight contender Anthony Pettis via unanimous decision (30–27, 30–27, 30–27) on June 4, 2011, at The Ultimate Fighter 13 Finale.

Guida faced Benson Henderson on November 12, 2011, at UFC on Fox 1. Guida lost a hard fought decision after three rounds. Both fighters were awarded the Fight of the Night bonus.

Guida faced Gray Maynard on June 22, 2012, at UFC on FX 4. Guida lost to Maynard via split decision .

For his next fight, Guida moved down to the featherweight division and faced Hatsu Hioki on January 26, 2013, at UFC on Fox: Johnson vs. Dodson. Despite being outstruck by Hioki for the majority of the fight, Guida was able to take Hioki down multiple times using a strong top game and avoid Hioki's submission attempts from the bottom. Guida defeated Hioki via split decision.

Guida was expected to face Chad Mendes on April 20, 2013, at UFC on Fox 7. However it was revealed on March 15 that Guida had pulled out of the bout citing an injury.

A rescheduled bout with Mendes took place on August 31, 2013, at UFC 164. After a close first and second round, Guida was defeated by Mendes via TKO by punches, marking the first time ever in his career that he was finished by strikes.

Guida faced Tatsuya Kawajiri at UFC Fight Night 39. He won the fight by unanimous decision, in a performance that earned both participants Fight of the Night honors.

Guida faced Dennis Bermudez on July 26, 2014, at UFC on Fox 12. He lost the bout via submission in the second round.

Guida faced Robbie Peralta on April 4, 2015, at UFC Fight Night 63. He won the fight by unanimous decision.

Guida faced Thiago Tavares on November 7, 2015, at UFC Fight Night 77. He lost the fight due to a guillotine choke submission early in the first round.

Guida faced Brian Ortega on June 4, 2016, at UFC 199. He lost the fight via KO in the third round.

Guida next faced Erik Koch at UFC Fight Night: Chiesa vs. Lee on June 25, 2017. He won the fight by unanimous decision.

Guida faced Joe Lauzon on November 11, 2017, at UFC Fight Night: Poirier vs. Pettis. He won via TKO in the first round.

Guida was expected to face Bobby Green on June 9, 2018, at UFC 225. However, Green pulled out of the bout, citing an injury and was replaced by Charles Oliveira Guida lost the fight via guillotine choke submission in the first round.

Guida next faced former two-division UFC champion B.J. Penn on May 11, 2019, at UFC 237. He won the fight via unanimous decision.

On June 28, 2019, it was announced that the fight between Guida and Diego Sanchez at The Ultimate Fighter 9 Finale, where Sanchez defeat Guida by split decision, on June 20, 2009, will be honored to enter the UFC Hall of Fame during the international fight July 2019.

Guida faced Jim Miller on August 3, 2019, at UFC on ESPN 5. He lost the fight via a technical submission due to a guillotine choke in the first minute of the first round.

Guida faced Bobby Green on June 20, 2020, at UFC Fight Night: Blaydes vs. Volkov. He lost the fight via unanimous decision.

As the first fight of his new, four-fight contract Guida faced Michael Johnson on February 6, 2021, at UFC Fight Night 184. He won the fight via unanimous decision.

Guida faced Mark Madsen on August 21, 2021, at UFC on ESPN 29. He lost the fight via split decision.

Guida faced Leonardo Santos on December 4, 2021, at UFC on ESPN: Font vs. Aldo. Despite nearly being finished with knees and punches in round one, Guida came back and won the fight via rear-naked choke submission in round two. This win earned him the Performance of the Night award.

Guida faced Claudio Puelles on April 23, 2022, at UFC Fight Night 205. He lost the fight via a kneebar in round one.

Guida faced Scott Holtzman on December 3, 2022, at UFC on ESPN 42. He won the fight via split decision.

Guida faced Rafa García on April 15, 2023, at UFC on ESPN 44. He lost the fight by unanimous decision.

Guida faced Joaquim Silva on December 2, 2023, at UFC on ESPN 52. He lost the fight via unanimous decision.

Guida faced Chase Hooper on December 7, 2024 at UFC 310. He lost the fight via an armbar submission in the first round. With his nineteenth UFC loss, Guida now ties Jeremy Stephens for the record of most losses in UFC history.

On January 16, 2025, it was reported that Guida was released by the UFC.

== Other combat sports ==
Guida defeated Billy Quarantillo by unanimous decision in a submission grappling match on December 30, 2021, at Fury Pro Grappling 3.

Guida returned to wrestling competition at the 2022 US Open, competing alongside his teammate Urijah Faber at the event.

On May 28, 2022, Guida competed in the co-main event of Fury Pro Grappling 4, facing Brad Boulton in a submission grappling match. Guida submitted Boulton with an arm-triangle choke at 7:22.

Guida competed in a submission grappling match against fellow UFC fighter Chase Hooper in the co-main event of Fury Pro Grappling 6 on December 30, 2022, and was submitted with a calf slicer at 3:55.

In a freestyle wrestling match, Guida faced Frankie Edgar on July 18, 2026 at RAF 11 and lost by decision.

Guida is scheduled to face Raul Rosas Jr. on November 28, 2026 at RAF 15.

== Sponsorship ==
Clay Guida starred in a National commercial for SafeAuto Insurance. The commercial was filmed in Columbus, Ohio in April 2011. Guida is one of several fighters who represents the SafeAuto Fight Team.

Guida is managed by VFD Sports Marketing, a sports marketing company that focuses on UFC athletes.

== Personal life ==
Guida is a fan of the Chicago Bears and Chicago Cubs. Guida is also a die hard Grateful Dead fan. He attended the GD50 Grateful Dead reunion shows.

== Championships and accomplishments ==
- Strikeforce
  - Strikeforce Lightweight Championship (One time; First)
- Ultimate Fighting Championship
  - UFC Hall of Fame (Fight wing, Class of 2019) vs. Diego Sanchez
  - Fight of the Night (Six times) vs. Tyson Griffin, Roger Huerta, Nate Diaz, Diego Sanchez, Benson Henderson and Tatsuya Kawajiri
  - Performance of the Night (One time) vs. Leonardo Santos
  - Submission of the Night (Three times) vs. Justin James, Shannon Gugerty and Takanori Gomi
  - Tied (Charles Oliveira & Rafael dos Anjos) for the fifth most bouts in UFC history (37)
    - Tied (King Green) for second most bouts in UFC Lightweight division history (30) (behind Jim Miller)
  - Fourth most takedowns landed in UFC history (78)
    - Second most takedowns landed in UFC Lightweight division history (65) (behind Gleison Tibau)
  - Seventh most total fight time in UFC history (7:03:17)
    - Second most total fight time in UFC Lightweight division history (5:44:31) (behind Jim Miller)
  - Most control time in UFC Lightweight division history (2:06:34)
    - Second most control time in UFC history (2:36:28) (behind Georges St-Pierre)
  - Most top position time in UFC Lightweight division history (1:29:44)
    - Third most top position time in UFC history (1:48:14)
  - Third most total strikes landed in UFC Lightweight division history (1691)
  - Tied (Brad Tavares) for fifth most decision bouts in UFC history (20)
    - Tied (Jorge Masvidal, Angela Hill, Cortney Casey, Paul Felder & Andrea Lee) for most split decision losses in UFC history (4)
    - Tied for third most split decision wins in UFC history (4)
    - Most split decision bouts in UFC history (8)
  - Tied (Jim Miller for second most losses in UFC history (19) (behind Jeremy Stephens)
  - UFC.com Awards
    - 2007: Fight of the Year vs. Roger Huerta & Ranked #10 Fight of the Year vs. Tyson Griffin (Tied with Matt Grice vs. Jason Black)
    - 2009: Fight of the Year vs. Diego Sanchez & Ranked #3 Loss of the Year vs. Diego Sanchez
    - 2011: Ranked #3 Fight of the Year vs. Benson Henderson
    - 2021: Ranked #8 Submission of the Year vs. Leonardo Santos
- FIGHT! Magazine
  - 2007 Fight of the Year vs. Roger Huerta at The Ultimate Fighter: Team Hughes vs. Team Serra Finale
- World MMA Awards
  - 2009 Fight of the Year vs. Diego Sanchez at The Ultimate Fighter: United States vs. United Kingdom Finale
- Wrestling Observer Newsletter
  - 2009 Fight of the Year vs. Diego Sanchez at The Ultimate Fighter: United States vs. United Kingdom Finale
- Tequila CAZADORES Spirit Award
  - Tequila CAZADORES Spirit Award (Two times)
- Inside MMA
  - 2009 Fight of the Year Bazzie Award vs. Diego Sanchez at The Ultimate Fighter: United States vs. United Kingdom Finale
- MixedMartialArts.com
  - 2009 Fight of the Year vs. Diego Sanchez at The Ultimate Fighter: United States vs. United Kingdom Finale
- Bloody Elbow
  - 2009 Fight of the Year vs. Diego Sanchez at The Ultimate Fighter: United States vs. United Kingdom Finale

== Mixed martial arts record ==
Professional record breakdown
63 matches	38 wins	25 losses
By knockout	8	2
By submission	14	12
By decision	16	10
Unknown	0	1

Res.	Record	Opponent	Method	Event	Date	Round	Time	Location	Notes
Loss	38–25	Chase Hooper	Submission (armbar)	UFC 310	December 7, 2024	1	3:41	Las Vegas, Nevada, United States	
Loss	38–24	Joaquim Silva	Decision (unanimous)	UFC on ESPN: Dariush vs. Tsarukyan	December 2, 2023	3	5:00	Austin, Texas, United States	
Loss	38–23	Rafa García	Decision (unanimous)	UFC on ESPN: Holloway vs. Allen	April 15, 2023	3	5:00	Kansas City, Missouri, United States	
Win	38–22	Scott Holtzman	Decision (split)	UFC on ESPN: Thompson vs. Holland	December 3, 2022	3	5:00	Orlando, Florida, United States	
Loss	37–22	Claudio Puelles	Submission (kneebar)	UFC Fight Night: Lemos vs. Andrade	April 23, 2022	1	3:01	Las Vegas, Nevada, United States	
Win	37–21	Leonardo Santos	Submission (rear-naked choke)	UFC on ESPN: Font vs. Aldo	December 4, 2021	2	1:21	Las Vegas, Nevada, United States	Performance of the Night.
Loss	36–21	Mark Madsen	Decision (split)	UFC on ESPN: Cannonier vs. Gastelum	August 21, 2021	3	5:00	Las Vegas, Nevada, United States	
Win	36–20	Michael Johnson	Decision (unanimous)	UFC Fight Night: Overeem vs. Volkov	February 6, 2021	3	5:00	Las Vegas, Nevada, United States	
Loss	35–20	Bobby Green	Decision (unanimous)	UFC on ESPN: Blaydes vs. Volkov	June 20, 2020	3	5:00	Las Vegas, Nevada, United States	
Loss	35–19	Jim Miller	Technical Submission (guillotine choke)	UFC on ESPN: Covington vs. Lawler	August 3, 2019	1	0:58	Newark, New Jersey, United States	
Win	35–18	B.J. Penn	Decision (unanimous)	UFC 237	May 11, 2019	3	5:00	Rio de Janeiro, Brazil	
Loss	34–18	Charles Oliveira	Submission (guillotine choke)	UFC 225	June 9, 2018	1	2:28	Chicago, Illinois, United States	
Win	34–17	Joe Lauzon	TKO (punches and elbows)	UFC Fight Night: Poirier vs. Pettis	November 11, 2017	1	1:07	Norfolk, Virginia, United States	
Win	33–17	Erik Koch	Decision (unanimous)	UFC Fight Night: Chiesa vs. Lee	June 25, 2017	3	5:00	Oklahoma City, Oklahoma, United States	Return to Lightweight.
Loss	32–17	Brian Ortega	KO (knee)	UFC 199	June 4, 2016	3	4:40	Inglewood, California, United States	
Loss	32–16	Thiago Tavares	Submission (guillotine choke)	UFC Fight Night: Belfort vs. Henderson 3	November 7, 2015	1	0:39	São Paulo, Brazil	
Win	32–15	Robbie Peralta	Decision (unanimous)	UFC Fight Night: Mendes vs. Lamas	April 4, 2015	3	5:00	Fairfax, Virginia, United States	
Loss	31–15	Dennis Bermudez	Submission (rear-naked choke)	UFC on Fox: Lawler vs. Brown	July 26, 2014	2	2:57	San Jose, California, United States	
Win	31–14	Tatsuya Kawajiri	Decision (unanimous)	UFC Fight Night: Nogueira vs. Nelson	April 11, 2014	3	5:00	Abu Dhabi, United Arab Emirates	Fight of the Night.
Loss	30–14	Chad Mendes	TKO (punches)	UFC 164	August 31, 2013	3	0:30	Milwaukee, Wisconsin, United States	
Win	30–13	Hatsu Hioki	Decision (split)	UFC on Fox: Johnson vs. Dodson	January 26, 2013	3	5:00	Chicago, Illinois, United States	Featherweight debut.
Loss	29–13	Gray Maynard	Decision (split)	UFC on FX: Maynard vs. Guida	June 22, 2012	5	5:00	Atlantic City, New Jersey, United States	
Loss	29–12	Benson Henderson	Decision (unanimous)	UFC on Fox: Velasquez vs. dos Santos	November 12, 2011	3	5:00	Anaheim, California, United States	UFC Lightweight title eliminator. Fight of the Night.
Win	29–11	Anthony Pettis	Decision (unanimous)	The Ultimate Fighter: Team Lesnar vs. Team dos Santos Finale	June 4, 2011	3	5:00	Las Vegas, Nevada, United States	
Win	28–11	Takanori Gomi	Submission (guillotine choke)	UFC 125	January 1, 2011	2	4:27	Las Vegas, Nevada, United States	Submission of the Night.
Win	27–11	Rafael dos Anjos	TKO (jaw injury)	UFC 117	August 7, 2010	3	1:51	Oakland, California, United States	
Win	26–11	Shannon Gugerty	Submission (arm-triangle choke)	UFC Live: Vera vs. Jones	March 21, 2010	2	3:40	Broomfield, Colorado, United States	Submission of the Night.
Loss	25–11	Kenny Florian	Submission (rear-naked choke)	UFC 107	December 12, 2009	2	2:19	Memphis, Tennessee, United States	
Loss	25–10	Diego Sanchez	Decision (split)	The Ultimate Fighter: United States vs. United Kingdom Finale	June 20, 2009	3	5:00	Las Vegas, Nevada, United States	Fight of the Night. Fight of the Year.
Win	25–9	Nate Diaz	Decision (split)	UFC 94	January 31, 2009	3	5:00	Las Vegas, Nevada, United States	Fight of the Night.
Win	24–9	Mac Danzig	Decision (unanimous)	UFC Fight Night: Diaz vs. Neer	September 17, 2008	3	5:00	Omaha, Nebraska, United States	
Win	23–9	Samy Schiavo	TKO (punches)	UFC Fight Night: Florian vs. Lauzon	April 2, 2008	1	4:15	Broomfield, Colorado, United States	
Loss	22–9	Roger Huerta	Submission (rear-naked choke)	The Ultimate Fighter: Team Hughes vs. Team Serra Finale	December 8, 2007	3	0:51	Las Vegas, Nevada, United States	Fight of the Night. Fight of the Year.
Win	22–8	Marcus Aurélio	Decision (split)	UFC 74	August 25, 2007	3	5:00	Las Vegas, Nevada, United States	
Loss	21–8	Tyson Griffin	Decision (split)	UFC 72	June 16, 2007	3	5:00	Belfast, Northern Ireland	Fight of the Night.
Loss	21–7	Din Thomas	Decision (unanimous)	UFC Fight Night: Evans vs. Salmon	January 25, 2007	3	5:00	Hollywood, Florida, United States	
Win	21–6	Justin James	Submission (rear-naked choke)	UFC 64	October 14, 2006	2	4:42	Las Vegas, Nevada, United States	Submission of the Night.
Win	20–6	Joe Martin	Decision (unanimous)	WEC 23	August 17, 2006	3	5:00	Lemoore, California, United States	
Loss	19–6	Yusuke Endo	Submission (armbar)	Shooto 2006: 7/21 in Korakuen Hall	July 21, 2006	1	2:47	Tokyo, Japan	
Loss	19–5	Gilbert Melendez	Decision (split)	Strikeforce: Revenge	June 9, 2006	5	5:00	San Jose, California, United States	Lost the Strikeforce Lightweight Championship.
Win	19–4	Josh Thomson	Decision (unanimous)	Strikeforce: Shamrock vs. Gracie	March 10, 2006	5	5:00	San Jose, California, United States	Won the inaugural Strikeforce Lightweight Championship.
Loss	18–4	Tristan Yunker	Submission (rear-naked choke)	KOTC: Redemption on the River	February 17, 2006	1	1:17	Moline, Illinois, United States	
Win	18–3	Joe Jordan	Decision (unanimous)	Xtreme Fighting Organization 8	December 10, 2005	3	5:00	Lakemoor, Illinois, United States	
Win	17–3	Jeff Carsten	TKO (injury)	Ironheart Crown 9: Purgatory	November 19, 2005	1	3:01	Hammond, Indiana, United States	
Win	16–3	Dave Cochran	Submission (rear-naked choke)	KOTC: Xtreme Edge	September 17, 2005	1	2:26	Indianapolis, Indiana, United States	
Win	15–3	John Strawn	Submission (arm-triangle choke)	Xtreme Fighting Organization 7	August 27, 2005	2	3:12	Island Lake, Illinois, United States	
Win	14–3	Jay Estrada	Submission (rear-naked choke)	Combat Do Fighting Challenge 4	August 13, 2005	1	3:42	Cicero, Illinois, United States	
Win	13–3	Bart Palaszewski	Decision (unanimous)	Xtreme Fighting Organization 6: Judgement Day	June 25, 2005	3	5:00	Lakemoor, Illinois, United States	
Win	12–3	Alonzo Martinez	Submission (arm-triangle choke)	Xtreme Kage Kombat: Des Moines	May 20, 2005	3	3:22	Des Moines, Iowa, United States	Won the XKK 4-man tournament.
Win	11–3	Chris Mickle	Decision (unanimous)	Xtreme Kage Kombat: Des Moines	May 20, 2005	3	5:00	Des Moines, Iowa, United States	XKK 4-man tournament semifinal.
Win	10–3	Alex Carter	Submission (punches)	Combat Do Fighting Challenge 3	May 14, 2005	1	2:54	Cicero, Illinois, United States	
Win	9–3	Brandon Adamson	Submission (rear-naked choke)	Xtreme Fighting Organization 5	March 19, 2005	1	3:02	Lakemoor, Illinois, United States	
Win	8–3	Billy Guardiola	Submission (ankle lock)	Combat Do Fighting Challenge 2	February 5, 2005	1	N/A	Cicero, Illinois, United States	
Win	7–3	Dennis Davis	KO (knee)	MMA Mexico Day 2	December 18, 2004	1	N/A	Ciudad Juárez, Mexico	
Win	6–3	Vito Woods	Submission (guillotine choke)	Xtreme Fighting Organization 4	December 3, 2004	2	1:19	McHenry, Illinois, United States	
Win	5–3	Randy Hauer	TKO (punches)	Extreme Challenge 60	November 12, 2004	1	2:25	Medina, Minnesota, United States	
Win	4–3	Billy Guardiola	Submission (ankle lock)	Combat Do Fighting Challenge 1	October 23, 2004	1	N/A	Cicero, Illinois, United States	
Loss	3–3	Gabe Lemley	Submission (armbar)	Xtreme Fighting Organization 2: New Blood	June 26, 2004	2	0:33	Fontana, Wisconsin, United States	
Win	3–2	Jed Deno	Submission (choke)	Ultimate Combat Sports 2: Battle at the Barn	May 1, 2004	1	3:35	Rochester, Minnesota, United States	
Win	2–2	Shawn Nolan	TKO (punches)	Xtreme Kage Kombat: Clash in Curtiss 5	April 3, 2004	N/A	N/A	Curtiss, Wisconsin, United States	
Loss	1–2	Dan Duke	N/A	Xtreme Kage Kombat: Clash in Curtiss 5	April 3, 2004	N/A	N/A	Curtiss, Wisconsin, United States	
Win	1–1	Adam Bass	Submission (rear-naked choke)	Xtreme Fighting Organization 1: The Kickoff	March 14, 2004	1	2:53	Lake Geneva, Wisconsin, United States	
Loss	0–1	Adam Copenhaver	Submission (rear-naked choke)	Silverback Classic 17	July 26, 2003	1	N/A	Ottawa, Illinois, United States	

== Grappling record ==
6 Matches, 2 Wins, 2 losses, 2 draws
Result	Rec.	Opponent	Method	Event	Date	Location
Loss	2–2–2	(United States) Chase Hooper	Submission (Calf Slicer)	Fury Pro Grappling 6	30 December 2022	Philadelphia, Pennsylvania, United States
Draw	2–1–2	(United States) Alex Caceres	Draw	Fury Pro Grappling 5	27 August 2022	Philadelphia, Pennsylvania, United States
Win	2–1–1	(United States) Brad Boulton	Submission (Arm Triangle Choke)	Fury Pro Grappling 4	28 May 2022	Philadelphia, Pennsylvania, United States
Win	1–1–1	(United States) Billy Quarantillo	Decision	Fury Pro Grappling 3	30 December 2021	Philadelphia, Pennsylvania, United States
Draw	0–1–1	(Brazil) Renato Sobral	Draw	Quintet Ultra	12 December 2019	Las Vegas, Nevada
Loss	0–1	(Brazil) Gregor Gracie	Submission (Arm Bar)	Quintet Ultra	12 December 2019	Las Vegas, Nevada

== See also ==
- List of male mixed martial artists

Achievements
New championship	1st Strikeforce Lightweight Champion; March 10, 2006 – June 9, 2006	Succeeded by Gilbert Melendez
