= UFC 64 =

UFC mixed martial arts event in 2006

UFC 64: Unstoppable
- The poster for UFC 64: Unstoppable
- Promotion: Ultimate Fighting Championship
- Date: October 14, 2006
- Venue: Mandalay Bay Events Center
- City: Las Vegas, Nevada
- Attendance: 10,173 (8,913 paid)
- Total gate: $1,790,490
- Buyrate: 300,000
- Total purse: $209,000 (disclosed only)

Event chronology
Ortiz vs. Shamrock 3: The Final Chapter	UFC 64: Unstoppable	The Ultimate Fighter: The Comeback Finale

UFC 64: Unstoppable was a mixed martial arts event held by the Ultimate Fighting Championship on Saturday, October 14, 2006. The event took place at the Mandalay Bay Events Center, on the Las Vegas Strip in Nevada and was broadcast live on pay-per-view in the United States and Canada.

== Background ==
The card centered on a UFC Middleweight Championship defense by Rich Franklin against the highly touted Anderson Silva.

The card also featured a UFC Lightweight Championship bout between The Ultimate Fighter alumnus Kenny Florian and longtime UFC veteran Sean Sherk. It was the first Lightweight Championship bout since UFC 41 in 2003, when B.J. Penn and Caol Uno fought to a draw.

A planned match between Keith Jardine and Mike Nickels was cancelled a day before the event when Nickels reaggravated a previous back injury sustained during training. A replacement could not be found on short notice.

Clay Guida made his UFC debut at this event.

== Results ==
Main Card
Weight class				Method	Round	Time	Notes
Middleweight	Anderson Silva	def.	Rich Franklin (c)	KO (knee)	1	2:59	(Note: For the UFC Middleweight Championship)
Lightweight	Sean Sherk	def.	Kenny Florian	Decision (unanimous) (49–46, 49–46, 50–45)	5	5:00	(Note: For the vacant UFC Lightweight Championship)
Welterweight	Jon Fitch	def.	Kuniyoshi Hironaka	Decision (unanimous) (30–25, 30–27, 30–27)	3	5:00
Heavyweight	Carmelo Marrero	def.	Cheick Kongo	Decision (split) (29–28, 28–29, 29–28)	3	5:00
Lightweight	Spencer Fisher	def.	Dan Lauzon	TKO (punches)	1	4:38
Preliminary Card
Middleweight	Yushin Okami	def.	Kalib Starnes	TKO (punches)	3	1:40
Lightweight	Clay Guida	def.	Justin James	Submission (rear-naked choke)	2	4:42	(Note: This bout aired last on the PPV broadcast.)
Lightweight	Kurt Pellegrino	def.	Júnior Assunção	Submission (rear-naked choke)	1	2:04

== Bonus awards ==
- Fight of the Night: Sean Sherk vs. Kenny Florian
- Knockout of the Night: Anderson Silva
- Submission of the Night: Clay Guida

== See also ==
- Ultimate Fighting Championship
- List of UFC champions
- List of UFC events
- 2006 in UFC
