= UFC Live: Vera vs. Jones =

UFC mixed martial arts event in 2010

- The poster for UFC Live: Vera vs. Jones
- Promotion: Ultimate Fighting Championship
- Date: March 21, 2010
- Venue: 1stBank Center
- City: Broomfield, Colorado
- Attendance: 6,443
- Total gate: $568,125

Event chronology
UFC 110: Nogueira vs. Velasquez	UFC Live: Vera vs. Jones	UFC 111: St. Pierre vs. Hardy

UFC Live: Vera vs. Jones (also known as UFC on Versus 1) was a mixed martial arts event held by the Ultimate Fighting Championship on March 21, 2010, in Broomfield, Colorado, United States, at the 1stBank Center. This event was the UFC's debut on Versus. The event was also shown on various international networks including Rogers Sportsnet in Canada, Televisa in Mexico, and ESPN in the UK.

== Background ==
Brandon Vera was previously scheduled to fight Antônio Rogério Nogueira at UFC 109, but Nogueira was forced out of the bout with an ankle injury.

A bout between Clay Guida and Sean Sherk was in the works but Sherk suffered an undisclosed injury and was forced to pull out. Shannon Gugerty stepped in as the replacement against Guida.

John Howard was originally scheduled to fight Anthony Johnson but Johnson was forced to withdraw from the bout with a knee injury. Daniel Roberts came in as Johnson's replacement.

Spencer Fisher was set to fight Duane Ludwig but was forced out of the bout due to an undisclosed injury. Darren Elkins stepped in for the injured Fisher.

Rob Kimmons was forced to pull out of his bout with Mike Pierce from a leg injury. Julio Paulino was Kimmons' replacement.

The event drew an estimated 1,240,000 viewers on Versus.

== Results ==
Main card
Weight class				Method	Round	Time	Notes
Light Heavyweight	Jon Jones	def.	Brandon Vera	TKO (elbow and punches)	1	3:19	(Note: Vera had 1 point deducted in round 1 for an illegal upkick.)
Heavyweight	Junior dos Santos	def.	Gabriel Gonzaga	KO (punches)	1	3:53
Heavyweight	Cheick Kongo	def.	Paul Buentello	TKO (submission to strikes)	3	1:16
Middleweight	Alessio Sakara	def.	James Irvin	TKO (punches)	1	3:01
Preliminary card
Lightweight	Clay Guida	def.	Shannon Gugerty	Submission (arm-triangle choke)	2	3:40	(Note: This bout aired on the broadcast following the Sakara vs Irvin bout.)
Light Heavyweight	Vladimir Matyushenko	def.	Eliot Marshall	Decision (split) (30–27, 28–29, 30–27)	3	5:00
Lightweight	Darren Elkins	def.	Duane Ludwig	TKO (ankle injury)	1	0:44
Welterweight	John Howard	def.	Daniel Roberts	KO (punch)	1	2:01	(Note: This bout aired on the broadcast following the Guida vs Gugerty bout.)
Heavyweight	Brendan Schaub	def.	Chase Gormley	TKO (punches)	1	0:47
Welterweight	Mike Pierce	def.	Julio Paulino	Decision (unanimous) (30–27, 30–27, 30–27)	3	5:00
Light Heavyweight	Jason Brilz	def.	Eric Schafer	Decision (unanimous) (29–28, 29–28, 29–28)	3	5:00

== Bonus awards ==
The following fighters received $50,000 bonuses.

- Fight of the Night: No bonus awarded
- Knockout of the Night: John Howard, Cheick Kongo and Junior dos Santos
- Submission of the Night: Clay Guida

== Reported payout ==
The following is the reported payout to the fighters as reported to the Colorado Department of Regulatory Agencies. It does not include sponsor money or "locker room" bonuses often given by the UFC and also do not include the UFC's traditional "fight night" bonuses.

- Jon Jones: $40,000 (includes $20,000 win bonus) def. Brandon Vera: $60,000
- Junior dos Santos: $70,000 ($35,000 win bonus) def. Gabriel Gonzaga: $67,000
- Cheick Kongo: $110,000 ($55,000 win bonus) def. Paul Buentello: $40,000
- Alessio Sakara: $42,000 ($21,000 win bonus) def. James Irvin: $20,000
- Clay Guida: $50,000 ($25,000 win bonus) def. Shannon Gugerty: $9,000
- Vladimir Matyushenko: $56,000 ($28,000 win bonus) def. Eliot Marshall: $10,000
- Darren Elkins: $12,000 ($6,000 win bonus) def. Duane Ludwig: $12,000
- John Howard: $26,000 ($13,000 win bonus) def. Daniel Roberts: $6,000
- Brendan Schaub: $20,000 ($10,000 win bonus) def. Chase Gormley: $10,000
- Mike Pierce: $16,000 ($8,000 win bonus) def. Julio Paulino: $6,000
- Jason Brilz: $18,000 ($9,000 win bonus) def. Eric Schafer: $13,000

== See also ==
- Ultimate Fighting Championship
- List of UFC champions
- List of UFC events
- 2010 in UFC
