= Brandon Vera =

Filipino and American mixed martial arts fighter

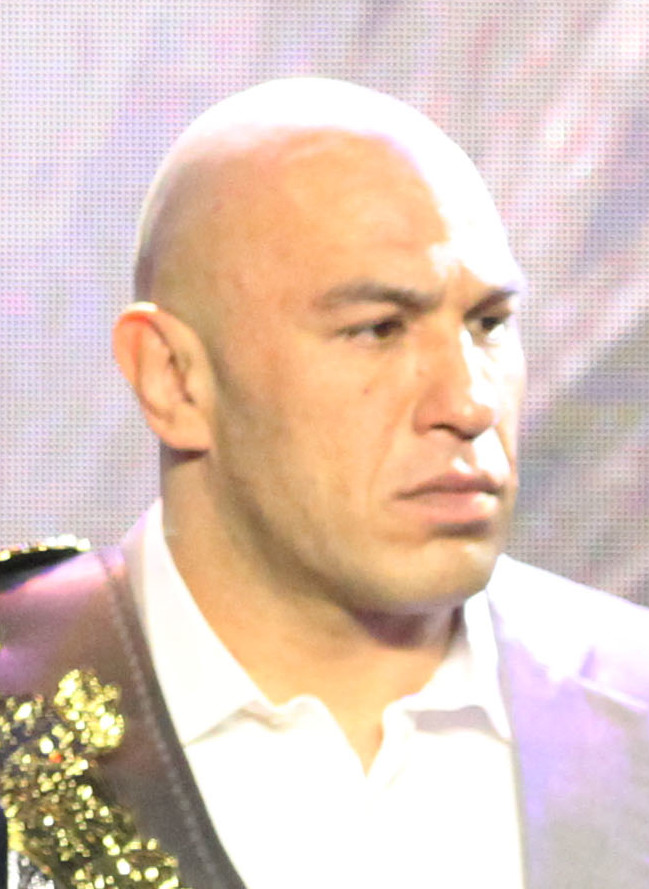
- Vera in 2018
- Born: Brandon Michael Vera; October 10, 1977 (age 49); Norfolk, Virginia, U.S.
- Other names: The Truth
- Nationality: American; Filipino
- Height: 6 ft 3 in (191 cm)
- Weight: 249 lb (113 kg; 17 st 11 lb)
- Division: Light heavyweight (2008–2012); Cruiserweight (Note: While competing for ONE Championship, Vera competes at 225 lb (102.1 kg). ONE Championship refers to their 225 lb weight class as light heavyweight weight, but per the Association of Boxing Commissions in the United States, 225 lb is considered cruiserweight.) (2019); Heavyweight (2002–2008, 2013–2018, 2021–2022)
- Reach: 78 in (200 cm)
- Style: Wrestling, Brazilian Jiu-Jitsu, Muay Thai
- Fighting out of: Manila, Philippines
- Team: Kill Cliff FC; Alliance Training Center PH
- Rank: Black belt in Brazilian Jiu-Jitsu under Lloyd Irvin
- Wrestling: NCAA Division I Wrestling; Greco-Roman Wrestling
- Years active: 2002–2022

Mixed martial arts record
- Total: 27
- Wins: 16
- By knockout: 11
- By submission: 1
- By decision: 4
- Losses: 10
- By knockout: 7
- By decision: 3
- No contests: 1

Other information
- University: Old Dominion University
- Spouse: Kerry Kasik (m. 2006; div. 2016) Jessica Craven (m. 2018)
- Notable school: Lake Taylor High School
- Website: http://www.brandonvera.com
- Mixed martial arts record from Sherdog
- Military career
- Allegiance: United States
- Branch: United States Air Force
- Service years: 1997–1999

Brandon Michael Vera (born October 10, 1977), or also known by his nickname "The Truth", is a Filipino and American retired mixed martial artist. A professional competitor from 2002 to 2022, he competed in the heavyweight and light heavyweight divisions, for promotions such as ONE Championship, where he was the inaugural ONE Heavyweight Champion, World Extreme Cagefighting (WEC), where he became the 2005 WEC Heavyweight Grand Prix Champion, and the Ultimate Fighting Championship (UFC).

== Background ==
Brandon Michael Vera grew up in a house of seven boys and three girls. He was born to a Filipino father, Ernesto, and an American mother of Italian descent, but raised by his Filipino stepmother, Amelia. He also has two other brothers and another sister outside of the family in which he was raised and they were occasionally involved in his life. Vera was born and raised in Norfolk, Virginia, and learned Filipino culture growing up; one of the rules in the family was that everyone had to speak Tagalog (which Vera learned from his grandmother who spoke no English), and if any of the children were caught speaking English in the house, Vera's father would punish them.

Vera attended Lake Taylor High School where he excelled in wrestling and earned a four-year athletic scholarship to Old Dominion University. However, he dropped out of Old Dominion after a year and a half when he felt college was not for him, and enlisted himself in the United States Air Force. In the Air Force, Vera joined the wrestling team and trained at the United States Olympic Training Center in Colorado Springs, Colorado. His military wrestling career was cut short in 1999 when he tore ligaments in his right elbow. Arthroscopic surgery repaired the ligaments, but he had nerve damage from the experience, causing him to be unable to use his right arm. He was released from the Air Force on a medical discharge.

Following his discharge from the Air Force, Vera returned to Virginia, where he steadily rehabilitated his arm, and eventually was fit enough to enter the Grapplers Quest submission wrestling competitions on the East Coast. There, his solitary training methods (he did not belong to a camp and trained and cut weight on his own) caught the attention of Lloyd Irvin, a Brazilian jiu-jitsu Black Belt and coach, who invited him to train with his school. At Irvin's school, he was introduced to mixed martial arts.

== Mixed martial arts career ==
=== Early career ===
Vera's first professional mixed martial arts bout was on July 6, 2002, while training under Lloyd Irvin. He won the fight against Adam Rivera via TKO in the first round. He fought and won another bout in 2004 before entering the WEC 13 Heavyweight Tournament in 2005, where he won two bouts in one night, including a bout against The Ultimate Fighter 2's Mike Whitehead in the final.

Vera then moved to San Diego, California, on December 31, 2003, to accept a training position with City Boxing. At City Boxing, Vera excelled as a trainer and was taken under the wing of owner Mark Dion, who became his manager and introduced him to kickboxing great Rob Kaman. With Vera's success as a trainer and a mixed martial arts fighter, Dion gave Vera partial ownership of City Boxing.

=== Ultimate Fighting Championship ===
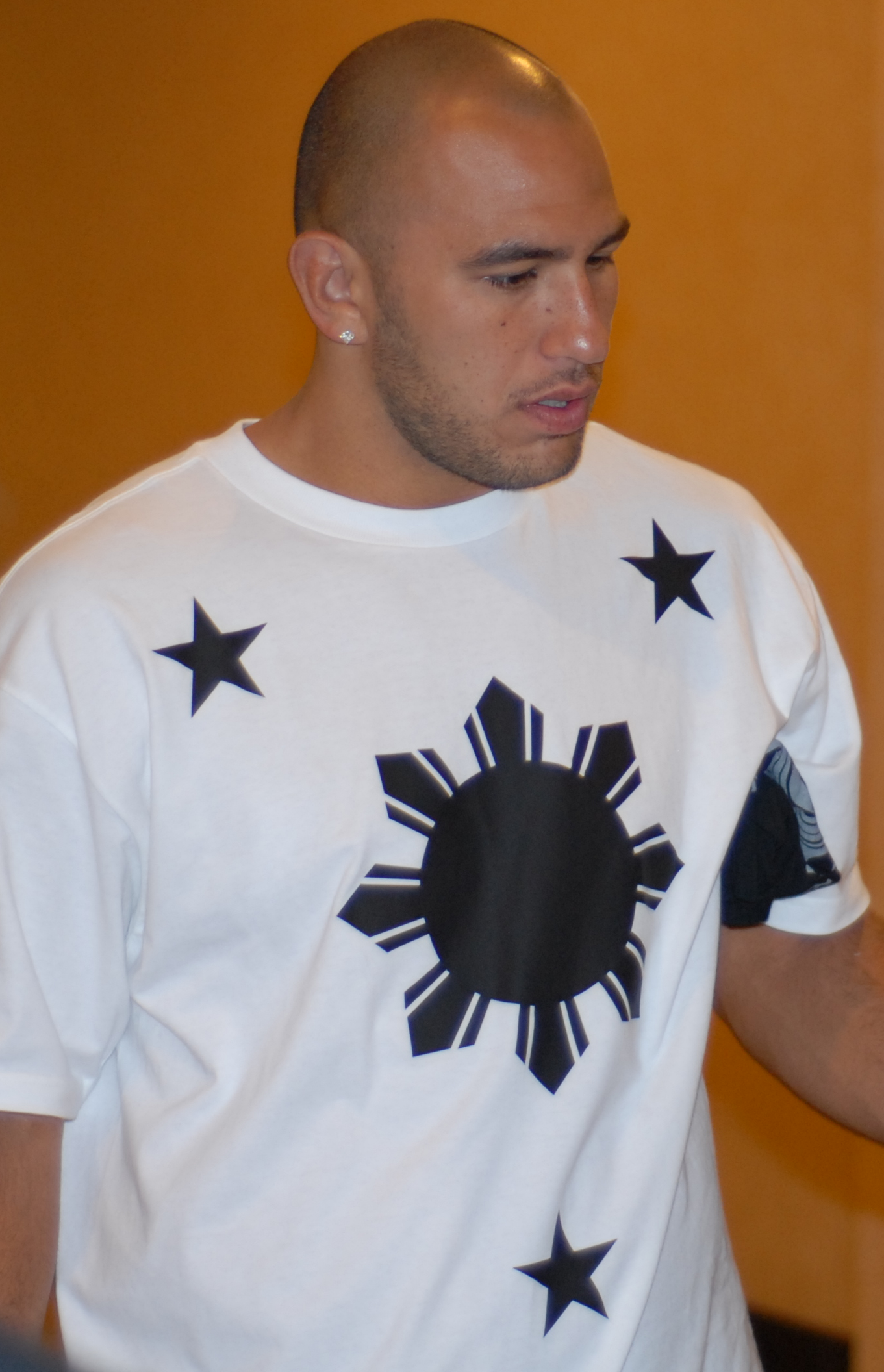
Vera in 2007.

Vera made his UFC debut at Ultimate Fight Night 2 on October 3, 2005, against BJJ black belt Fabiano Scherner. Vera won the fight via KO due to knees from the clinch midway through the second round. Following the Scherner bout, he faced Justin Eilers at UFC 57, winning early in the first round by KO. At UFC 60, Vera defeated Assuério Silva with a guillotine choke in the first round. On November 18, he stopped former heavyweight champion Frank Mir by TKO due to strikes in just 69 seconds at UFC 65 in Sacramento, California.

White had been telling the media prior to UFC 65 that the winner of the Vera-Mir fight would face the winner of the Tim Sylvia-Jeff Monson bout, which was also being held that same night, for the championship. Vera's victory secured him a championship bout against then title-holder Tim Sylvia, but a contract dispute with the UFC forced him to be replaced by Randy Couture.

In August, the UFC announced the "return" of Vera. His first fight was at UFC 77 against Sylvia, who had recently lost the UFC Heavyweight Championship to Couture. Vera lost for the first time via unanimous decision. He also broke his left hand at 4:40 of the first round.

Vera had his second loss at UFC 85 against Brazilian jiu-jitsu specialist Fabrício Werdum via TKO. The fight was controversially stopped by referee Dan Miragliotta as Werdum mounted him and landed some ground and pound. After the stoppage, Vera was upset as he felt he was defending himself effectively.

After his two recent losses, Vera dropped down to the Light Heavyweight division, facing IFL alum Reese Andy at UFC Fight Night 14 on July 19, 2008, on Spike TV. Vera defeated Andy via unanimous decision.

At UFC 89, Vera lost to Keith Jardine via a narrow split decision. Following the fight, Vera incurred criticism for his performance since his return to the UFC having been victorious in only one of his last four fights.

A more focused Vera appeared on the preliminary card of UFC 96. It was the first time Vera was not on the main card since he made his debut in the UFC. He had an impressive performance against Mike Patt, showing a more aggressive and intense striking approach and stopping him via TKO (leg kicks) in the second round.

Vera fought Polish fighter Krzysztof Soszynski at UFC 102 after his original opponent, Matt Hamill, was forced to drop out due after suffering a meniscus tear while training. Vera won via unanimous decision (30–27, 30–27, and 30–27).

Vera lost a close fight to Randy Couture via unanimous decision on November 14, 2009, at UFC 105, with the media comparing the decision to a previous UFC event (UFC 104 Machida-Rua) which prompted that MMA judging should be changed. Despite Vera significantly outstriking Couture and successfully defending numerous takedown attempts, judges awarded the victory to Couture. The verdict surprised many people; UFC commentator Joe Rogan was highly critical of the decision during the live event broadcast and in a post-fight interview, Randy Couture admitted that he didn't expect the decision to be made in his favor.

Vera faced Jon Jones on March 21, 2010, at UFC Live: Vera vs. Jones and lost via TKO in the first round after an elbow from Jones broke Vera's face in three places.

Vera was defeated by Brazilian Thiago Silva via unanimous decision (30–26, 30–27, and 30–27) on January 1, 2011, at UFC 125. At the end of the third round, Vera stood up to reveal a badly broken nose. Vera was released by the UFC with a 7–6 record in the organization. However following the fight it was revealed that his opponent Thiago Silva had failed the post-fight drug test. As a result of this, Vera was re-hired by the UFC and the result of the Silva fight was changed to a no contest, resulting in Vera's UFC record changing to 7–5–0–1.

Vera defeated Eliot Marshall on October 29, 2011, at UFC 137 via unanimous decision (29–28, 29–28, and 29–28).

Vera was briefly linked to a rematch Thiago Silva on May 15, 2012, at UFC on Fuel TV: Korean Zombie vs. Poirier. However, Vera was forced out the bout with an injury.

Vera was expected to face Australian James Te-Huna on July 11, 2012, at UFC on Fuel TV: Munoz vs. Weidman. However, Vera was pulled from the bout with Te-Huna to face Maurício Rua on August 4, 2012, at UFC on Fox: Shogun vs. Vera. Vera was defeated via TKO late in the fourth round. Vera showed great heart after being rocked early in the second round, but as both fighters showed early signs of fatigue in the late stages of the second round, Vera ultimately succumbed to Rua's power. This fight is widely considered the best performance of Vera's career, despite the loss.

Vera returned to the Heavyweight division after an absence of 5 years and faced Ben Rothwell at UFC 164 on August 31, 2013. After a competitive first and second round, Rothwell defeated Vera by TKO in the third round. Subsequent to the bout, Rothwell tested positive for elevated testosterone levels. The UFC suspended Rothwell for nine months, despite the Wisconsin commission only issuing him with an administrative warning.

Vera was released from the UFC on June 17, 2014, ending his eight-year run with the promotion.

=== ONE Championship ===
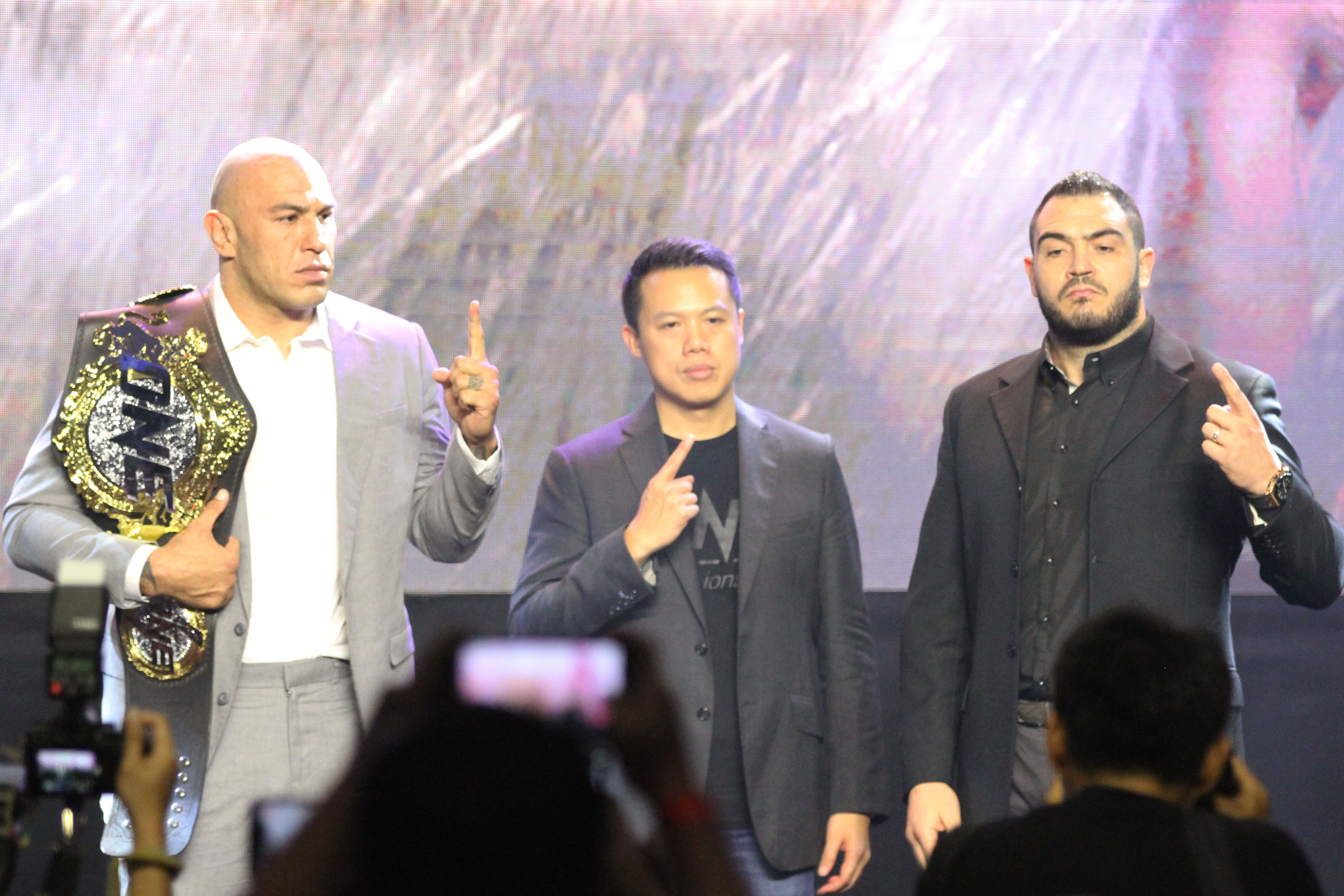
Vera (left) and Mauro Cerilli (right) in the "Conquest of Champions".

On July 13, 2014, it was confirmed that Vera had signed with Singapore-based promotion ONE FC. His debut was on December 5, 2014, against Ukrainian striker Igor Subora at ONE Fighting Championship: Warrior's Way. Vera won the fight via knockout after landing a counter straight left at 3:54 minutes in the first round.

Vera was originally scheduled to face English kickboxing specialist Chi Lewis-Parry at ONE Championship: Spirit of Champions on December 11, 2015 to crown the inaugural ONE Heavyweight Champion. However, he faced Taiwanese Paul Cheng instead, who replaced Parry on three days-notice after Parry failed to submit his medical records, did not show up for the pre-event press conference nor board his flight to Manila. Vera won the fight via knockout just twenty six seconds into the first round to win the championship.

After nearly a year away from the cage, Vera returned to face Japanese grappler Hideki Sekine at ONE Championship: Age of Domination on December 2, 2016. He successfully defended his heavyweight title, winning by TKO in the first round.

Vera successfully defended his title via knockout in the first round against Cage Warriors Heavyweight Champion, Mauro Cerilli who was on his promotional debut at ONE Championship: Conquest of Champions on November 23, 2018.

As the first fight of his new ten-bout contract with ONE, Vera challenged Aung La Nsang for the ONE Light Heavyweight Championship at ONE Championship: Century on October 13, 2019 in Tokyo, Japan, thus marking Vera's first fight in ONE Championship to take place outside of the Philippines. Vera lost by TKO in the second round.

At ONE Championship: Fire & Fury on January 31, 2020, Vera announced that he would be defending his ONE Heavyweight Championship on May 29 in Manila, with an opponent yet to be announced. It was later announced that he would be defending his ONE Heavyweight title against Arjan Bhullar at ONE Infinity 2. Their fight was later postponed as a result of the impact of the COVID-19 pandemic on sports.

Vera faced Bhullar at ONE Championship: Dangal on May 15, 2021, with the fight taking place in Kallang, Singapore. Vera lost to Bhullar by second-round technical knockout, ending his five-year reign as ONE Heavyweight World Champion.

Vera faced Amir Aliakbari on December 3, 2022, at ONE 164. He lost the fight via technical knockout in the first round and announced his retirement during the post-fight interview.

== Post-MMA career ==
After announcing his retirement in December 2022, Vera revealed that he signed a 10-movie deal as an actor in the Philippines. Prior to this announcement, Vera already appeared in a couple of Filipino movies. In 2018, Vera co-starred with Anne Curtis in the Philippine action-thriller BuyBust and starred as the lead actor in a 2022 Filipino zombie movie called Day Zero.

== Personal life ==
Vera was married to Kerry Kasik, a fellow former mixed martial artist who fought for the now-defunct Strikeforce. She was featured on the second season of Oxygen's Fight Girls. In September 2014, Kerry filed for divorce, which was finalized two years later.

During the latter stages of his training for UFC 89, Vera was reportedly held at gun point by two men attempting to rob the house in which he was staying. Vera stated that the incident did not affect his performance against Keith Jardine.

Vera started dating Jessica Craven in 2016 and announced their engagement in April 2017. They wed on April 20, 2018, in Guam. Their son, Atreyu Timothy, was born on July 26, 2020.

Vera has numerous tattoos, one of which is the Filipino scribe Baybayin inked on his back, which reads mundo (earth), hangin (wind), apoy (fire) and tubig (water), clockwise.

While staying in the Philippines, he trained Filipino actor Richard Gutierrez in martial arts and was given a role as an assassin for Philippine primetime television show, Kamandag on the GMA Network.

In 2016, Vera revealed that he was relocating to the Philippines full time, to help grow the sport of mixed martial arts in his ancestral homeland. He has been working on opening a branch of Alliance MMA Gym. Vera holds dual citizenship: American (by jus solis) and Filipino (by jus sanguinis).

== Championships and accomplishments ==
=== Kickboxing ===
- World Kickboxing Association
  - WKA Super Heavyweight Champion

=== Grappling ===
- Grappler's Quest
  - 8 Time Grappler's Quest Champion

=== Mixed martial arts ===
- Ultimate Fighting Championship
  - UFC Encyclopedia Awards
    - Knockout of the Night (One time) vs. Fabiano Scherner
- World Extreme Cagefighting
  - 2005 WEC Heavyweight Grand Prix Championship
- ONE Championship
  - ONE Heavyweight Championship (One time, first)
    - 2 title defenses

== Mixed martial arts record ==
Professional record breakdown
| 27 matches | 16 wins | 10 losses |
| By knockout | 11 | 7 |
| By submission | 1 | 0 |
| By decision | 4 | 3 |
| No contests | 1 | |

| Res. | Record | Opponent | Method | Event | Date | Round | Time | Location | Notes |
|---|---|---|---|---|---|---|---|---|---|
| Loss | 16–10 (1) | Amir Aliakbari | TKO (elbows and punches) | ONE 164 | December 3, 2022 | 1 | 3:37 | Pasay, Philippines | |
| Loss | 16–9 (1) | Arjan Bhullar | TKO (punches) | ONE: Dangal | April 28, 2021 | 2 | 4:27 | Kallang, Singapore | Lost the ONE Heavyweight Championship. |
| Loss | 16–8 (1) | Aung La Nsang | TKO (punches) | ONE: Century – Part 2 | October 13, 2019 | 2 | 3:23 | Tokyo, Japan | Return to Light Heavyweight. For the ONE Light Heavyweight Championship (205 lb). |
| Win | 16–7 (1) | Mauro Cerilli | KO (punch) | ONE: Conquest of Champions | November 23, 2018 | 1 | 1:04 | Pasay, Philippines | Defended the ONE Heavyweight Championship. |
| Win | 15–7 (1) | Hideki Sekine | TKO (body kick and punches) | ONE: Age of Domination | December 2, 2016 | 1 | 3:11 | Pasay, Philippines | Defended the ONE Heavyweight Championship. |
| Win | 14–7 (1) | Paul Cheng | KO (punch and head kick) | ONE: Spirit of Champions | December 11, 2015 | 1 | 0:26 | Pasay, Philippines | Won the inaugural ONE Heavyweight Championship. |
| Win | 13–7 (1) | Igor Subora | TKO (punch and soccer kicks) | ONE FC: Warrior's Way | December 5, 2014 | 1 | 3:54 | Pasay, Philippines | |
| Loss | 12–7 (1) | Ben Rothwell | TKO (punches and knees) | UFC 164 | August 31, 2013 | 3 | 1:54 | Milwaukee, Wisconsin, United States | Return to Heavyweight. Rothwell tested positive for high testosterone. |
| Loss | 12–6 (1) | Maurício Rua | TKO (punches) | UFC on Fox: Shogun vs. Vera | August 4, 2012 | 4 | 4:03 | Los Angeles, California, United States | |
| Win | 12–5 (1) | Eliot Marshall | Decision (unanimous) | UFC 137 | October 29, 2011 | 3 | 5:00 | Las Vegas, Nevada, United States | |
| NC | 11–5 (1) | Thiago Silva | NC (overturned) | UFC 125 | January 1, 2011 | 3 | 5:00 | Las Vegas, Nevada, United States | Originally a unanimous decision win for Silva; overturned after he falsified his urine sample. |
| Loss | 11–5 | Jon Jones | TKO (elbows and punches) | UFC Live: Vera vs. Jones | March 21, 2010 | 1 | 3:19 | Broomfield, Colorado, United States | |
| Loss | 11–4 | Randy Couture | Decision (unanimous) | UFC 105 | November 14, 2009 | 3 | 5:00 | Manchester, England | |
| Win | 11–3 | Krzysztof Soszynski | Decision (unanimous) | UFC 102 | August 29, 2009 | 3 | 5:00 | Portland, Oregon, United States | |
| Win | 10–3 | Michael Patt | TKO (leg kicks) | UFC 96 | March 7, 2009 | 2 | 1:27 | Columbus, Ohio, United States | |
| Loss | 9–3 | Keith Jardine | Decision (split) | UFC 89 | October 18, 2008 | 3 | 5:00 | Birmingham, England | |
| Win | 9–2 | Reese Andy | Decision (unanimous) | UFC Fight Night: Silva vs. Irvin | July 19, 2008 | 3 | 5:00 | Las Vegas, Nevada, United States | Light Heavyweight debut. |
| Loss | 8–2 | Fabrício Werdum | TKO (punches) | UFC 85 | June 7, 2008 | 1 | 4:40 | London, England | |
| Loss | 8–1 | Tim Sylvia | Decision (unanimous) | UFC 77 | October 20, 2007 | 3 | 5:00 | Cincinnati, Ohio, United States | |
| Win | 8–0 | Frank Mir | TKO (knees and punches) | UFC 65 | November 18, 2006 | 1 | 1:09 | Sacramento, California, United States | |
| Win | 7–0 | Assuério Silva | Submission (guillotine choke) | UFC 60 | May 27, 2006 | 1 | 2:39 | Los Angeles, California, United States | |
| Win | 6–0 | Justin Eilers | KO (head kick and knee) | UFC 57 | February 4, 2006 | 1 | 1:25 | Las Vegas, Nevada, United States | |
| Win | 5–0 | Fabiano Scherner | TKO (knees and punches) | UFC Fight Night 2 | October 3, 2005 | 2 | 3:22 | Las Vegas, Nevada, United States | |
| Win | 4–0 | Mike Whitehead | TKO (doctor stoppage) | WEC 13 | January 22, 2005 | 2 | 1:12 | Lemoore, California, United States | Won the 2005 WEC Heavyweight Grand Prix. |
| Win | 3–0 | Andre Mussi | KO (knees and punches) | WEC 13 | January 22, 2005 | 1 | 0:51 | Lemoore, California, United States | 2005 WEC Heavyweight Grand Prix Semifinal. |
| Win | 2–0 | Don Richards | Decision (unanimous) | Next Level Fighting 1 | September 13, 2003 | 2 | 5:00 | Steubenville, Ohio, United States | |
| Win | 1–0 | Adam Rivera | TKO (punches) | Excalibur Fighting 11 | July 6, 2002 | 1 | 3:20 | Richmond, Virginia, United States | |

== Filmography ==
=== Film ===
| Year | Title | Role | Production |
| 2018 | BuyBust | Rico Yatco | Viva Films / Reality Entertainment |
| 2022 | Day Zero | Emon | Regal Entertainment |

=== Television ===
| Year | Title | Role | Network |
| 2007 | Kamandag | Assassin | GMA Network |
| 2018 | Magpakailanman | Kim / Jan | GMA Network |

=== Music videos ===
| Year | Title | Singer | Role |
| 2006 | Bebot: Version 1 | Black Eyed Peas | Customer |
