= Sean Sherk =

American mixed martial artist (born 1973)

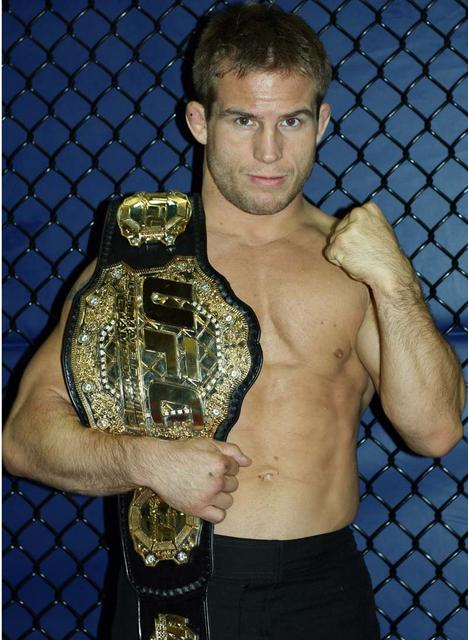
- Born: Sean Keith Sherk; August 5, 1973 (age 53); St. Francis, Minnesota, United States
- Other names: The Muscle Shark
- Height: 5 ft 6 in (1.68 m)
- Weight: 155 lb (70 kg; 11.1 st)
- Division: Lightweight (2006–2010); Welterweight (1999–2006)
- Reach: 67 in (170 cm)
- Style: Submission Wrestling
- Stance: Orthodox
- Fighting out of: Oak Grove, Minnesota, United States
- Team: Minnesota Martial Arts Academy
- Trainer: Greg Nelson
- Years active: 1999–2010

Mixed martial arts record
- Total: 41
- Wins: 36
- By knockout: 10
- By submission: 11
- By decision: 15
- Losses: 4
- By knockout: 2
- By decision: 2
- Draws: 1

Amateur record
- Total: 2
- Wins: 2
- Losses: 0

Other information
- Spouse: Heather Sherk
- Children: 2
- Website: http://seansherk.com/
- Mixed martial arts record from Sherdog

Sean Keith Sherk (born August 5, 1973) is an American retired mixed martial artist and former UFC Lightweight Champion. Sherk competed in the Ultimate Fighting Championship and was one of the first combatants to have been a championship competitor in multiple weight divisions (having also competed for the UFC Welterweight Championship). He was the second UFC Lightweight Champion in the organization's history after Jens Pulver vacated his title five years earlier. Sherk also spent time competing in the Japan-based organizations, PRIDE Fighting Championships and Pancrase; going undefeated in both promotions. He holds one of the longest undefeated streaks in mixed martial arts history, with only four career losses, all to fellow-UFC Champions. Sherk announced his official retirement from mixed martial arts competition in September 2013 having last fought three years prior.

Recognized for his role in the resurgence of the UFC Lightweight division, Sherk became the first UFC Lightweight Champion since the division was re-introduced by the UFC in 2006. He successfully defended the UFC Lightweight Championship against Hermes Franca at UFC 73, after winning the title in a Fight of the Night award winning performance against Kenny Florian at UFC 64. Sherk is noted to have taken part in some of the most important fights in the UFC's lightweight division, where he is considered to be one of the greatest lightweight competitors of his era.

== Martial arts background ==
Sherk was born on August 5, 1973, in St. Francis, Minnesota. Sherk began Wrestling and Weightlifting at age seven. He continued to wrestle for eleven years, and in that time he wrestled over 400 matches. After finding Greg Nelson's Minnesota Martial Arts Academy in 1994, Sherk began to practice Judo, Boxing, Shootfighting, and Muay Thai. In 1999, Sherk defeated Roscoe Ostyn by decision in his first MMA fight.

== Mixed martial arts career ==
Sherk began his mixed martial arts career in 1999, where he went on an eight-fight win streak before signing with the Ultimate Fighting Championship (UFC) in 2001. Sherk fought only once before leaving the UFC. He returned in 2002 and fought Matt Hughes for the UFC Welterweight Championship in 2003. He lost the match and went on to sign with Pride Fighting Championships (Pride).

=== Ultimate Fighting Championship (2001–2003) ===
Sherk made his UFC debut at UFC 30, where he defeated Tiki Ghosn. After going 5–0–1 outside the UFC, he was brought back to fight Jutaro Nakao at UFC 36, a fight which Sherk won via unanimous decision. On September 27, 2002, at UFC 39, Sherk defeated Benji Radach when the fight was stopped due to a cut Radach had received.

Sherk was then chosen to fight Matt Hughes for the UFC Welterweight Championship on April 25, 2003. Sherk lost the fight via unanimous decision after going five five-minute rounds. In a back and forth battle, Sherk won two of the overall five rounds, becoming the first and only fighter to ever fight a full five round fight with then-champion Matt Hughes.

=== Pride (2004) ===
Following his loss to Hughes, Sherk fought three more times in 2003, winning all three bouts. In 2004, he signed with Pride and made his debut with the Japanese-based organization at Pride Bushido 2. Sherk defeated Ryuki Ueyama via unanimous decision, in what was his only outing in the company.

According to Sherk's website, the Japanese fans are the ones responsible for giving him the nickname "The Muscle Shark." While he was popular in Japan, Sherk found it difficult to travel and support his family and found he could make a better living fighting as a main event on local shows. He also cited his lack of health insurance for making this decision.

=== Return to the UFC (2005–2010) ===
Sherk was invited back to the UFC in 2005 for a fight with Georges St. Pierre. Sherk lost by TKO, but was given another fight in the UFC at UFC 59, Sherk demonstrated that he was able to stand and strike with the more documented striker in Nick Diaz as well as mixing his combination very well with his takedowns, he defeated Nick Diaz via unanimous decision. During the post-fight interview, Sherk stated his intention to drop down in weight to the lightweight division.

In October 2006, at UFC 64, Sherk won all five rounds using his superior wrestling and ground and pound and defeated Kenny Florian via unanimous decision to win the UFC Lightweight Championship. With this win, Sherk became the first UFC Lightweight Champion since Jens Pulver vacated the title in 2002. Sherk fought the bout with a torn rotator cuff and was forced to rehabilitate afterwards.

==== Steroid accusations ====
In July 2007, Sherk successfully defended his title against Hermes França at UFC 73. After the fight, the California State Athletic Commission (CSAC) announced that Sherk had tested positive for Nandrolone, a banned steroid, in a urine test the day prior to the fight. After testing positive for 12 ng/ml of Nandrolone, Sherk was fined $2,500 and suspended from competing in California for one year. Sherk's suspension was reduced to six months after appealing his allegations on December 4, 2007, making him eligible to fight in early January 2008. Sherk argued that errors were made in lab testing procedures. He asserted that the lab had failed to properly test the vials used in earlier, positive tests for any remaining steroid content, which may have resulted in his sample becoming contaminated. Quest Diagnostics and the CSAC denied any errors were made. Following the CSAC's decision to uphold the results of the positive steroid test, the UFC officially stripped Sherk of his UFC Lightweight Championship. At UFC 80, B.J. Penn defeated Joe Stevenson to win the vacant title. After the fight, UFC president Dana White announced that Penn's first title defense would be against Sherk, who was reinstated by UFC in April 2008, and has tested clean ever since. Sherk and Penn fought at UFC 84 on May 24, 2008. Sherk lost by TKO in the third round after failing to answer the fourth round bell.

==== After UFC 84 ====
Sherk fought Tyson Griffin at UFC 90: Silva vs Cote, in a fight with title contention implications. In a three-round war, Sherk won by unanimous decision, earning him a $65,000 Fight of the Night award. In the first round Sherk was putting the pressure on Griffin from the very beginning scoring take-downs and taking Griffins back. Throughout the second and third rounds Sherk took Griffin down once more and the rest remained an exciting striking battle between the two. Sherk demonstrated very crisp and technical striking that night.

Sherk next fought Frankie Edgar at UFC 98 losing via unanimous decision. Sherk again found himself in trouble with an athletic commission post fight, after he ran from the arena while still in his fight shorts and no shirt before supplying a post fight urinalysis. He was contacted by commission officer Keith Kizer and told to return to the arena immediately or face his license being revoked. Sherk returned within the hour and provided a urinalysis and tested clean, but was still suspended 45 days for the actions.

==== Injury plague hits ====
Sherk was scheduled to face Gleison Tibau at UFC 104, but was forced off the card with an injury. He was replaced by Josh Neer.

Sherk was scheduled to face Rafaello Oliveira on January 2, 2010 at UFC 108. However, due to an injury to Tyson Griffin, Sherk was promoted to the main card to fight Jim Miller. Sherk did not compete at UFC 108, pulling out due to injury. Sherk suffered a cut above his right eye requiring several stitches.

Sherk was expected to face Clay Guida on March 21, 2010 at UFC on Versus: Vera vs. Jones, but Sherk was forced off the card with yet another injury.

==== Return to the Octagon and Retirement ====
After a 16-month hiatus, Sherk returned on September 25, 2010 at UFC 119 and defeated Evan Dunham via split decision in a bout that earned Fight of the Night honors.

After rehabbing a litany of injuries over the past few years, Sherk indicated in October 2012 that he was still planning a return to the UFC and hoped to return sometime in early 2013.

On September 2, 2013, Sherk formally announced his retirement from MMA fighting.

On February 20, 2016, Sherk said that he would end his retirement to fight Royce Gracie in Bellator. He declined any indication of a UFC return.

== Personal life ==
Sherk and his wife Heather have two sons, Kyler and Tegan. Sherk has coached a team of fighters at the Minnesota Martial Arts Academy. He has also worked flipping houses in the Minnesota area.

== Championships and accomplishments ==
=== Mixed martial arts ===
- Ultimate Fighting Championship
  - UFC Lightweight Championship (One time)
    - One successful title defense
    - Second most takedowns landed in a UFC title fight (16 vs. Hermes França)
  - Fight of the Night (Three times) vs. Kenny Florian, Tyson Griffin, and Evan Dunham
  - UFC Encyclopedia Awards
    - Fight of the Night (One time) vs. Matt Hughes
  - Most control time in a UFC fight (22:18 vs. Hermes França)
  - UFC.com Awards
    - 2008: Ranked #4 Fight of the Year vs. Tyson Griffin
    - 2010: Ranked #5 Fight of the Year vs. Evan Dunham
- PRIDE Fighting Championship
  - One of only two UFC Lightweight Champions to compete in PRIDE FC

== Mixed martial arts record ==
Professional record breakdown
41 matches	36 wins	4 losses
By knockout	10	2
By submission	11	0
By decision	15	2
Draws	1	

Res.	Record	Opponent	Method	Event	Date	Round	Time	Location	Notes
Win	36–4–1	Evan Dunham	Decision (split)	UFC 119	September 25, 2010	3	5:00	Indianapolis, Indiana, United States	Fight of the Night.
Loss	35–4–1	Frankie Edgar	Decision (unanimous)	UFC 98	May 23, 2009	3	5:00	Las Vegas, Nevada, United States	
Win	35–3–1	Tyson Griffin	Decision (unanimous)	UFC 90	October 25, 2008	3	5:00	Rosemont, Illinois, United States	Fight of the Night.
Loss	34–3–1	B.J. Penn	TKO (knee and punches)	UFC 84	May 24, 2008	3	5:00	Las Vegas, Nevada, United States	For the UFC Lightweight Championship.
Win	34–2–1	Hermes França	Decision (unanimous)	UFC 73	July 7, 2007	5	5:00	Sacramento, California, United States	Defended the UFC Lightweight Championship. Sherk was stripped of the title on December 8, 2007 after failing post-fight drug test for nandrolone.
Win	33–2–1	Kenny Florian	Decision (unanimous)	UFC 64	October 14, 2006	5	5:00	Las Vegas, Nevada, United States	Lightweight debut. Won the vacant UFC Lightweight Championship. Fight of the Night.
Win	32–2–1	Nick Diaz	Decision (unanimous)	UFC 59	April 15, 2006	3	5:00	Anaheim, California, United States	
Loss	31–2–1	Georges St-Pierre	TKO (punches and elbows)	UFC 56	November 19, 2005	2	2:53	Las Vegas, Nevada, United States	
Win	31–1–1	Joel Blanton	Submission (rear-naked choke)	BP: Pride and Glory	September 17, 2005	1	2:02	Georgia, United States	
Win	30–1–1	Lee King	Submission (arm-triangle choke)	Extreme Challenge 60	November 12, 2004	1	2:20	Medina, Minnesota, United States	
Win	29–1–1	Brodie Farber	Submission (guillotine choke)	SF 6: Battleground in Reno	September 23, 2004	1	0:55	Reno, Nevada, United States	
Win	28–1–1	Darin Brudigan	Submission (arm-triangle choke)	Cage Fighting Xtreme 2	September 4, 2004	1	1:30	Brainerd, Minnesota, United States	
Win	27–1–1	Gerald Strebendt	TKO (punches)	Extreme Challenge 58	June 11, 2004	1	3:52	Medina, Minnesota, United States	
Win	26–1–1	Eric Heinz	Submission (neck crank)	Pride and Fury	June 3, 2004	1	0:58	Worley, Idaho, United States	
Win	25–1–1	Jake Short	Submission (rear-naked choke)	ICC: Trials 2	April 30, 2004	1	2:51	Minnesota, United States	
Win	24–1–1	Kaleo Padilla	Submission (neck crank)	You Think You're Tough	April 17, 2004	2	1:17	Kona, Hawaii, United States	
Win	23–1–1	Ryuki Ueyama	Decision (unanimous)	Pride Bushido 2	February 15, 2004	2	5:00	Yokohama, Japan	
Win	22–1–1	Charles Diaz	Submission (keylock)	EP: XXXtreme Impact	December 28, 2003	2	0:58	Tijuana, Mexico	
Win	21–1–1	Mark Long	TKO (submission to punches)	Extreme Combat	December 12, 2003	1	0:42	Fridley, Minnesota, United States	
Win	20–1–1	John Alexander	TKO (punches)	Extreme Combat	August 2, 2003	1	1:57	Anoka, Minnesota, United States	
Loss	19–1–1	Matt Hughes	Decision (unanimous)	UFC 42	April 25, 2003	5	5:00	Miami, Florida, United States	For the UFC Welterweight Championship.
Win	19–0–1	John Alexander	Submission (rear-naked choke)	Extreme Combat 2	December 7, 2002	1	1:28	Minneapolis, Minnesota, United States	
Win	18–0–1	Benji Radach	TKO (doctor stoppage)	UFC 39	September 27, 2002	1	4:16	Uncasville, Connecticut, United States	
Win	17–0–1	Jutaro Nakao	Decision (unanimous)	UFC 36	March 22, 2002	3	5:00	Las Vegas, Nevada, United States	
Win	16–0–1	Claudionor Fontinelle	Submission (rear-naked choke)	UCC 6: Redemption	October 19, 2001	2	1:04	Montreal, Quebec, Canada	
Draw	15–0–1	Kiuma Kunioku	Draw	Pancrase - 2001 Neo-Blood Tournament Second Round	July 29, 2001	3	5:00	Tokyo, Japan	
Win	15–0	Curtis Brigham	TKO (corner stoppage)	UW: St. Paul	July 15, 2001	3	1:15	St. Paul, Minnesota, United States	
Win	14–0	Jason Purcell	TKO (punches)	UW: Ultimate Fight Minnesota	June 2, 2001	1	1:42	Bloomington, Minnesota, United States	
Win	13–0	Marty Armendarez	TKO (punches)	KOTC 8 - Bombs Away	April 29, 2001	3	2:07	Williams, California, United States	
Win	12–0	Manny Gamburyan	Decision (unanimous)	Reality Submission Fighting 3	March 30, 2001	1	18:00	Belleville, Illinois, United States	
Win	11–0	Tiki Ghosn	TKO (shoulder injury)	UFC 30	February 23, 2001	2	4:47	Atlantic City, New Jersey, United States	Ghosn suffered a dislocated shoulder.
Win	10–0	Karo Parisyan	TKO (corner stoppage)	Reality Submission Fighting 2	January 5, 2001	1	16:20	Belleville, Illinois, United States	
Win	9–0	Ken Parham	Decision (unanimous)	Submission Fighting Championships	November 3, 2000	2	5:00	Collinsville, Illinois, United States	
Win	8–0	Karo Parisyan	Decision (unanimous)	Reality Submission Fighting 1	October 10, 2000	1	18:00	Belleville, Illinois, United States	
Win	7–0	Steve Gomm	Decision (split)	Extreme Challenge 28	October 9, 1999	1	10:00	Ogden, Utah, United States	
Win	6–0	Scott Bills	Decision (unanimous)	Extreme Challenge 28	October 9, 1999	1	10:00	Ogden, Utah, United States	
Win	5–0	Kurtis Jensen	TKO (punches)	Extreme Challenge: Trials	October 4, 1999	1	1:00	Mason City, Iowa, United States	
Win	4–0	Johnnie Holland	Submission (keylock)	Ultimate Wrestling	August 13, 1999	2	2:10	Bloomington, Minnesota, United States	
Win	3–0	Joe Paun	Decision (unanimous)	Midwest MMA Championship 1	July 11, 1999	1	15:00	Clinton, Iowa, United States	
Win	2–0	Dean Kugler	Decision (unanimous)	Midwest MMA Championship 1	July 11, 1999	1	10:00	Clinton, Iowa, United States	
Win	1–0	Roscoe Ostyn	Decision (unanimous)	Dangerzone: Mahnomen	June 19, 1999	3	3:00	Mahnomen, Minnesota, United States	

Vacant Title last held by Jens Pulver	2nd UFC Lightweight Champion; October 14, 2006 - December 8, 2007	Vacant Sherk stripped of title Title next held by B.J. Penn
