= Trevor Wittman =

American martial arts coach (born 1974)

- Born: March 5, 1974 (age 52); Denver, Colorado, U.S.

Other information
- Occupation: Owner and trainer, ONX Sports
- University: Colorado Institute of Art
- Spouse: Christina Wittman (m. 2005)
- Children: 2
- Website: onxsports.com

Trevor Wittman (born March 5, 1974) is an American boxing and mixed martial arts coach. He is the founder of ONX Sports, a combat sports equipment company based in Golden, Colorado.

== Training career ==
Compelled to retire from boxing at 21 years old after being diagnosed with a hyperinflated lung, Wittman transitioned to training boxers in the Denver metropolitan area. He founded T's K.O. Fight Club in Wheat Ridge, Colorado in March 1998. The business broadened its scope to include other combat sports such as mixed martial arts, eventually resulting in Wittman closing T's K.O. Fight Club and establishing the Grudge Training Center facility in Wheat Ridge in 2009. Grudge relocated to Arvada, Colorado in 2013. Having developed experience working with and making training equipment for fighters, in 2015 Wittman founded ONX Sports, a combat sports equipment company. To focus more attention on ONX Sports, Wittman closed down Grudge in November 2016, though he continues to train a few select fighters, including Rose Namajunas, Justin Gaethje, and Kamaru Usman.

== Personal life ==
Wittman wrestled at Berlin High School, after which he moved to New Jersey, then to Colorado, where he attended the Colorado Institute of Art. Wittman married his wife Christina in 2005, and has a son and a daughter.

In 2021, it was reported that Wittman was diagnosed with Dupuytren's contracture, limiting his mobility. He has also lived with benign paroxysmal positional vertigo.

== Notable fighters trained ==
=== Mixed martial arts ===
- Michael Bisping
- Kamaru Usman
- Rose Namajunas
- Justin Gaethje
- Stipe Miocic
- T.J. Dillashaw
- Donald Cerrone
- Cory Sandhagen
- Georges St-Pierre
- Neil Magny
- Matt Mitrione
- Roy Nelson
- Tyler Toner
- Gerald Harris
- Pat Barry
- Tyler Stinson
- Luke Caudillo
- James McSweeney
- Todd Duffee
- Jon Madsen
- Jared Hamman
- Ed Herman
- Justin Salas
- Brandon Thatch
- Rashad Evans
- Shane Carwin
- Melvin Guillard
- Brandon Girtz
- Nate Marquardt
- Duane Ludwig
- Cody Donovan
- Alvin Robinson
- Bobby Lashley
- Keith Jardine
- Paul Buentello
- Justin Wren
- Kevin Burns
- Mike Wessel
- Farès Ziam

=== Boxers ===
- Manuel Perez
- Verno Phillips
- Juan Carlos Candelo
- DeAndrey Abron
- DaVarryl Williamson

== Awards ==
- World MMA Awards
  - 2017 The Shawn Tompkins Coach of the Year
  - 2019 – July 2020 The Shawn Tompkins Coach of the Year
  - 2021 The Shawn Tompkins Coach of the Year
- Voting period for 2019 awards ran from January 2019 to July 2020 due to the COVID-19 pandemic. Subsequently, the voting period for 2021 awards ran from July 2020 to July 2021.
- MMAjunkie.com
  - 2021 Coach of the Year
- Yahoo! Sports
  - 2020 Trainer of the Year
  - 2021 Coach of the Year
- Combat Press
  - 2021 Coach of the Year
