= Jorge Gurgel =

Brazilian mixed martial arts fighter

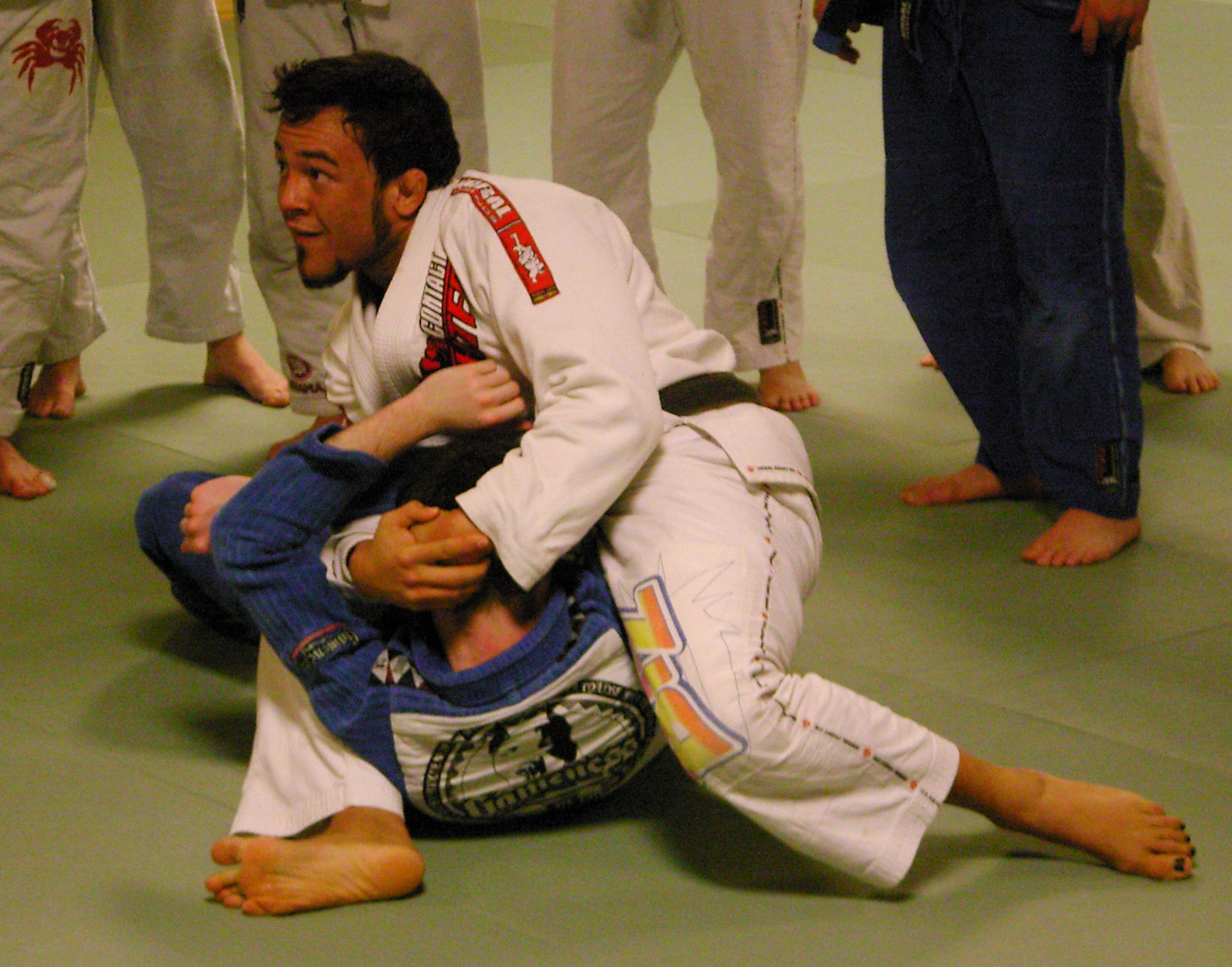
- Jorge Gurgel, Brazilian mixed martial arts fighter.
- Born: Silvio Jorge Valente Gurgel; January 25, 1977 (age 49); Fortaleza, Brazil
- Other names: J.G.
- Nationality: Brazilian; American
- Height: 5 ft 9 in (1.75 m)
- Weight: 154 lb (70 kg; 11.0 st)
- Division: Lightweight (2002-2015); Welterweight (2005)
- Reach: 69.0
- Stance: Orthodox
- Fighting out of: West Chester, Ohio, United States
- Team: The JG MMA academy
- Rank: Sixth degree black belt in Brazilian Jiu-Jitsu
- Years active: 2000-2014

Mixed martial arts record
- Total: 24
- Wins: 14
- By knockout: 1
- By submission: 9
- By decision: 4
- Losses: 10
- By knockout: 2
- By submission: 2
- By decision: 6

Other information
- Website: http://www.jgmma.com
- Mixed martial arts record from Sherdog

Jorge Valente Gurgel (/ˈɡɜːrɡəl/; Portuguese pronunciation: [ˈʒɔʁʒi ɡuʁˈʒew]; born January 25, 1977) is a retired Brazilian mixed martial artist who competed in the Lightweight division. A professional competitor from 2002 to 2014, Gurgel is best known as a contestant on The Ultimate Fighter 2 and for his career with the Ultimate Fighting Championship and Strikeforce.

== Background ==
Gurgel is originally from Fortaleza, Brazil, where he earned a black belt in Brazilian jiu-jitsu under Marcus Aurélio. Gurgel immigrated to the United States as an exchange student in high school. Remaining to attend Wright State University he soon became an American citizen. While in school, Gurgel worked full-time teaching Brazilian jiu-jitsu evenings, waiting and busing tables late at night/early afternoons, and going to class in the morning. Since college, Gurgel has been training and teaching full-time.

== Mixed martial arts career ==
=== Ultimate Fighting Championship ===
Gurgel starred in the second season of The Ultimate Fighter television series and was eliminated from the show in the fifth episode due to a loss to Jason Von Flue via unanimous decision, but showed tremendous heart by fighting with a blown ACL.

Gurgel's match with Diego Saraiva at UFC 73 was designated as the "Fight of the Night" by the UFC. In the contest, Gurgel defeated Saraiva by unanimous decision, even though he was badly injured during the fight. He was hospitalized afterward, due to a broken jaw and the presence of blood in his urine.

After his loss to Aaron Riley, Gurgel was released from the UFC. Gurgel was heavily criticized throughout his seven-fight run in the UFC for not displaying Brazilian jiu-jitsu skills in his fights. A third degree Brazilian jiu-jitsu black belt, the 35-year-old has generally elected to slug it out on his feet.

=== Strikeforce ===
Gurgel made his Strikeforce debut on June 19, 2009, defeating Conor Heun via unanimous decision.

Gurgel faced Billy Evangelista on November 6, 2009 at Strikeforce Challengers: Gurgel vs. Evangelista losing via unanimous decision.

Gurgel faced former EliteXC Lightweight Champion K. J. Noons at Strikeforce: Houston and lost by knockout 19 seconds into the second round. There was controversy surrounding this fight due to an apparent late punch by Noons at the end of the first round that dropped and stunned Gurgel and an illegal knee by Noons during the barrage of strikes prior to the referee stoppage.

Gurgel submitted Billy Vaughan in just 44 seconds via guillotine choke at Strikeforce: Feijao vs. Henderson on March 5, 2011.

Gurgel headlined Strikeforce Challengers 18 on August 12, 2011, against fellow Ultimate Fighter alumni Joe Duarte Gurgel lost by a unanimous decision.

Gurgel faced Adriano Martins at Strikeforce: Marquardt vs. Saffiedine on January 12, 2013, he lost via unanimous decision.

=== Titan Fighting Championship ===
Gurgel fought former UFC fighter Mike Ricci at Titan FC 27 on February 28, 2014. He lost by first-round TKO. Gurgel has now lost 7 of his last 9 fights.

On September 16, 2014, Gurgel announced his retirement from MMA competition.

=== Coaching ===
Gurgel owns the JG MMA and Fitness Academy in Cincinnati, Ohio, Gurgel has trained known fighters such as Rich Franklin, Justin Edwards, Zoila Frausto, Dustin Hazelett, Jason Butcher, and Sean Salmon.

== Personal life ==
Gurgel married female MMA fighter Zoila Frausto on February 19, 2011. The two have since separated.

== Championships and accomplishments ==
- Ultimate Fighting Championship
  - Fight of the Night (Two times)
- Absolute Combat Challenge
  - ACC Lightweight Championship (One time)

=== Brazilian jiu-jitsu ===
- NAGA SuperFight Champion
- Six-time Brazilian State Champion

== Mixed martial arts record ==
Professional record breakdown
24 matches	14 wins	10 losses
By knockout	1	2
By submission	9	2
By decision	4	6

Res.	Record	Opponent	Method	Event	Date	Round	Time	Location	Notes
Loss	14–10	Mike Ricci	TKO (punches and elbows)	Titan Fighting Championship 27	February 28, 2014	1	3:57	Kansas City, Kansas, United States	
Loss	14–9	Adriano Martins	Decision (unanimous)	Strikeforce: Marquardt vs. Saffiedine	January 12, 2013	3	5:00	Oklahoma City, Oklahoma, United States	
Loss	14–8	Joe Duarte	Decision (unanimous)	Strikeforce Challengers: Gurgel vs. Duarte	August 12, 2011	3	5:00	Las Vegas, Nevada, United States	
Win	14–7	Billy Vaughan	Submission (guillotine choke)	Strikeforce: Feijao vs. Henderson	March 5, 2011	1	0:44	Columbus, Ohio, United States	
Loss	13–7	K. J. Noons	KO (punches)	Strikeforce: Houston	August 21, 2010	2	0:19	Houston, Texas, United States	
Loss	13–6	Billy Evangelista	Decision (unanimous)	Strikeforce Challengers: Gurgel vs. Evangelista	November 6, 2009	3	5:00	Fresno, California, United States	Catchweight at 160 lb.
Win	13–5	Conor Heun	Decision (unanimous)	Strikeforce Challengers: Villasenor vs. Cyborg	June 19, 2009	3	5:00	Kent, Washington, United States	Catchweight at 160 lb.
Loss	12–5	Aaron Riley	Decision (unanimous)	UFC 91	November 15, 2008	3	5:00	Las Vegas, Nevada, United States	Fight of the Night.
Loss	12–4	Cole Miller	Submission (triangle choke)	UFC 86	July 5, 2008	3	4:48	Las Vegas, Nevada, United States	
Win	12–3	John Halverson	Decision (unanimous)	UFC 82	March 1, 2008	3	5:00	Columbus, Ohio, United States	
Loss	11–3	Alvin Robinson	Decision (unanimous)	UFC 77	October 20, 2007	3	5:00	Cincinnati, Ohio, United States	
Win	11–2	Diego Saraiva	Decision (unanimous)	UFC 73	July 7, 2007	3	5:00	Sacramento, California, United States	Fight of the Night.
Win	10–2	Danny Abbadi	Decision (split)	UFC 63: Hughes vs. Penn	September 23, 2006	3	5:00	Anaheim, California, United States	
Loss	9–2	Mark Hominick	Decision (unanimous)	UFC Fight Night 5	June 28, 2006	3	5:00	Las Vegas, Nevada, United States	
Win	9–1	Jason Ireland	Submission (guillotine choke)	KOTC 48: Payback	February 25, 2005	3	2:25	Cleveland, Ohio, United States	
Win	8–1	Joe Jordan	Submission (guillotine choke)	Extreme Challenge 56	March 26, 2004	1	1:55	Medina, Minnesota, United States	
Win	7–1	Gin Minajev	Submission (guillotine choke)	Extreme Challenge 56	March 26, 2004	3	1:00	Medina, Minnesota, United States	
Win	6–1	Steve Kinnison	Submission (guillotine choke)	Freestyle Fighting Championships 8	March 5, 2004	2	1:08	Biloxi, Mississippi, United States	
Loss	5–1	Masakazu Imanari	Submission (heel hook)	ZST: Grand Prix Opening Round	November 23, 2003	1	0:32	Tokyo, Japan	
Win	5–0	Luke Spencer	TKO (submission to punches)	Absolute Combat Challenge 1	July 19, 2003	3	1:55	Canton, Ohio, United States	Won the Absolute Combat Challenge Lightweight Championship.
Win	4–0	Justin James	Submission (armbar)	VFC 4: Wildcard	April 19, 2003	1	3:51	Council Bluffs, Iowa, United States	
Win	3–0	Gin Minajev	Submission (guillotine choke)	ICC 1: Retribution	January 12, 2003	1	2:18	Minneapolis, Minnesota, United States	
Win	2–0	Calib Carr	Submission (armbar)	UW: St. Cloud 2	March 16, 2002	1	0:18	St. Cloud, Minnesota, United States	
Win	1–0	Elvin Rodriguez	Submission (armbar)	UW: St. Cloud 2	March 16, 2002	1	1:10	St. Cloud, Minnesota, United States	

== See also ==
- List of Strikeforce alumni
