= UFC 78 =

UFC mixed martial arts event in 2007

UFC 78: Validation
- The poster for UFC 78: Validation
- Promotion: Ultimate Fighting Championship
- Date: November 17, 2007
- Venue: Prudential Center
- City: Newark, New Jersey
- Attendance: 14,071
- Total gate: $2,100,000
- Buyrate: 400,000

Event chronology
UFC 77: Hostile Territory	UFC 78: Validation	The Ultimate Fighter: Team Hughes vs. Team Serra Finale

UFC 78: Validation was a mixed martial arts event held by the Ultimate Fighting Championship (UFC), that took place on November 17, 2007, at the Prudential Center in Newark, New Jersey. Validation was the first UFC event held in New Jersey since UFC 53: Heavy Hitters in Atlantic City on June 5, 2005.

== Background ==
This was the 100th event in UFC's history.

The main event featured TUF 2 Heavyweight winner Rashad Evans against TUF 3 Light Heavyweight winner Michael Bisping in a light heavyweight contest. This was Bisping's last fight before dropping to Middleweight. Originally, Evans and Bisping were set to rematch their previous opponents Tito Ortiz and Matt Hamill at this event after their bouts ended in a draw and a controversial split decision at UFC 73 and UFC 75. However, Ortiz's commitments to filming Celebrity Apprentice forced his fight with Evans to be cancelled and an injury to Hamill forced him to withdraw from his fight with Bisping.

PRIDE veteran and Cuban judoka Hector Lombard was also scheduled to debut on the event but did not participate due to visa issues. Lombard ended up signing after UFC 145. Lombard's original opponent Karo Parisyan instead faced Ryo Chonan, while Chonan's previous opponent Thiago Alves fought Chris Lytle.

Additionally, PRIDE veterans Ryo Chonan and Akihiro Gono both made their UFC debuts. Both fighters fought at 183 pounds in Japan, but with the UFC's inclusion of the 170 pound division each fighter moved down to fight at welterweight.

== Results ==
Main card (PPV)
Weight class				Method	Round	Time	Notes
Light Heavyweight	Rashad Evans	def.	Michael Bisping	Decision (split) (29–28, 28–29, 29–28)	3	5:00
Light Heavyweight	Thiago Silva	def.	Houston Alexander	TKO (punches)	1	3:25
Welterweight	Karo Parisyan	def.	Ryo Chonan	Decision (unanimous) (30–27, 30–27, 30–27)	3	5:00
Middleweight	Ed Herman	def.	Joe Doerksen	KO (punch)	3	0:39
Lightweight	Frankie Edgar	def.	Spencer Fisher	Decision (unanimous) (30–27, 30–27, 30–26)	3	5:00
Preliminary card
Welterweight	Thiago Alves	def.	Chris Lytle	TKO (doctor stoppage)	2	5:00
Lightweight	Joe Lauzon	def.	Jason Reinhardt	Submission (rear-naked choke)	1	1:14	(Note: This preliminary bout aired on the broadcast after the Evans-Bisping fight.)
Lightweight	Marcus Aurélio	def.	Luke Caudillo	TKO (punches)	1	4:29
Welterweight	Akihiro Gono	def.	Tamdan McCrory	Submission (armbar)	2	3:19

== Bonus awards ==
The following fighters received $55,000 bonuses.

- Fight of the Night: Thiago Alves vs. Chris Lytle
- Knockout of the Night: Ed Herman
- Submission of the Night: Akihiro Gono

== See also ==
- Ultimate Fighting Championship
- List of UFC champions
- List of UFC events
- 2007 in UFC
