= Alonzo Martinez =

American mixed martial arts fighter

- Born: April 22, 1984 (age 42); Papillion, Nebraska, United States
- Other names: Zo Diddy
- Height: 5 ft 10 in (1.78 m)
- Weight: 155 lb (70 kg; 11.1 st)
- Division: Featherweight (145 lb); Lightweight (155 lb); Welterweight (170 lb)
- Reach: 69.0 in (175 cm)
- Fighting out of: Omaha, Nebraska, United States
- Team: Premier Combat Center
- Years active: 2003–present

Mixed martial arts record
- Total: 71
- Wins: 46
- By knockout: 15
- By submission: 20
- By decision: 11
- Losses: 24
- By knockout: 6
- By submission: 15
- By decision: 2
- Unknown: 1
- Draws: 1

Other information
- Mixed martial arts record from Sherdog

Alonzo Martinez (born April 22, 1984) is an American professional mixed martial arts fighter. Alonzo has fought twice for Bellator Fighting Championships as a lightweight and once with Strikeforce as a welterweight (though it was contested at a 160 lb catchweight). Martinez has been an MMA fighter for over eleven years, with notable fights against Toby Imada, and UFC vets Estevan Payan, Yves Edwards, and Yaotzin Meza. He is also known for his submission expertise, with 22 of his 36 career wins coming by submission.

== Mixed martial arts career ==
Martinez made his professional mixed martial arts debut on March 15, 2003, when he faced Demi Deeds at Gladiators 20. He lost the fight via first-round TKO. Following the loss, Martinez would compile a record of 22–12–1, with wins over UFC veterans such as Luke Caudillo, Dustin Neace, and Waylon Lowe, before signing with Bellator in April 2009.

=== Bellator ===
Martinez made his Bellator debut on April 3, 2009, when he fought against Toby Imada at Bellator 1 in the quarterfinal of the first Bellator Fighting Championships Lightweight Tournament. He lost his debut via rear-naked choke.

He returned to Bellator on May 15, 2009, facing Victor Meza at Bellator 7 in a non-tournament bout. He won via rear-naked choke.

=== Strikeforce ===
Martinez had a one-fight stint for now-defunct promotion Strikeforce, facing Estevan Payan on January 7, 2012, at Strikeforce: Rockhold vs. Jardine. He lost the fight via unanimous decision.

== Bare-knuckle boxing ==
=== Bare Knuckle Fighting Championship ===
Martinez made his debut with BKFC at BKFC Fight Night 8 on May 13, 2022 against Adalberto Serrano and won by knockout in the first round.

Martinez next fought Jordan Christensen at BKFC 33 on November 18, 2022 and won by unanimous decision.

Martinez fought Jeremy Sauceda at BKFC 43: Omaha on May 19, 2023 and won by technical knockout as a result of a corner stoppage.

Martinez faced Stanislav Grosu at BKFC Fight Night 14 on May 17, 2024. He lost the fight by technical knockout in the second round.

Martinez faced Kurtis Ellis on April 18, 2025 at BKFC Fight Night 24. He won the fight by unanimous decision.

Martinez faced Zeb Vincent on August 8, 2026 at BKFC Fight Night 44. He won the fight by knockout in the second round.

== Mixed martial arts record ==
Professional record breakdown
71 matches	46 wins	24 losses
By knockout	15	6
By submission	20	15
By decision	11	2
Unknown	0	1
Draws	1	

Res.	Record	Opponent	Method	Event	Date	Round	Time	Location	Notes
Loss	46–24–1	Zach Scroggin	Submission (rear-naked choke)	FAC 31	October 4, 2025	1	2:02	Independence, Missouri, United States	Catchweight (177 lb) bout.
Loss	46–23–1	Mike Santiago	Submission (guillotine choke)	Final Fight Championship 37	May 30, 2019	2	3:22	Las Vegas, Nevada, United States	Catchweight (160 lb) bout.
Win	45–20–1	Joey Munoz	Decision (unanimous)	Dynasty Combat Sports 44	May 11, 2019	3	5:00	Lincoln, Nebraska, United States	Welterweight bout.
Win	45–20–1	Rocky Long	Submission (guillotine choke)	Dynasty Combat Sports 44	July 27, 2018	1	3:30	Lincoln, Nebraska, United States	
Win	44–20–1	Anthony Baccam	Decision (unanimous)	Victory FC: Fight Night Coco Key 2	March 30, 2018	3	5:00	Omaha, Nebraska, United States	
Loss	43–22–1	Dan Moret	Submission (rear-naked choke)	Victory FC 59	December 16, 2017	1	1:39	Omaha, Nebraska, United States	
Loss	43–21–1	Abdul-Rakhman Makhazhiev	Submission (triangle armbar)	ACB 69	September 9, 2017	1	3:27	Almaty, Kazakhstan	
Win	43–20–1	Mike Plazola	Submission (rear-naked choke)	Victory FC 58	July 22, 2017	1	3:47	Omaha, Nebraska, United States	
Win	42–20–1	Doug Jenkins	TKO (injury)	Dynasty Combat Sports 34	May 26, 2017	2	4:53	Ralston, Nebraska, United States	Won the vacant DCS Lightweight Championship.
Win	41–20–1	Boimah Karmo	Submission (rear-naked choke)	Dynasty Combat Sports 29	October 14, 2016	1	3:28	Ralston, Nebraska, United States	
Loss	40–20–1	Travis Perzynski	TKO (punches)	Fight Night at the Island: Saunders vs. Volkmann	September 9, 2016	2	2:21	Welch, Minnesota, United States	Return to Lightweight.
Win	40–19–1	Kevin Tjaden	KO (punch)	KOTC: Summer Smash	June 25, 2016	1	0:32	Sloan, Iowa, United States	Catchweight (165 lb) bout.
Loss	39–19–1	Jarred Mercado	Submission (rear-naked choke)	Victory FC 47	January 29, 2016	2	2:15	Omaha, Nebraska, United States	Catchweight (148 lb) bout; Martinez missed weight.
Loss	39–18–1	Salman Zhamaldaev	KO (punch)	WFCA 9	October 4, 2015	1	0:48	Grozny, Russia	
Win	39–17–1	Cody Carrillo	Decision (unanimous)	Victory FC 46	July 25, 2015	3	5:00	Ralston, Nebraska, United States	
Win	38–17–1	Josh Huber	Decision (unanimous)	Victory FC 45	April 4, 2015	3	5:00	Ralston, Nebraska, United States	
Loss	37–17–1	Chad Curry	TKO (punches)	Driller Promotions: Caged Chaos at Canterbury Park 6	December 20, 2014	2	2:40	Shakopee, Minnesota, United States	
Win	37–16–1	Charlie DuBray	TKO (punches)	Dynasty Combat Sports 11	December 5, 2014	1	1:26	Lincoln, Nebraska, United States	Return to Featherweight. For the vacant DCS Featherweight Championship. Martinez missed weight (152 lb) and was ineligible for the title.
Win	36–16–1	Will Shutt	Submission (guillotine choke)	Victory FC 43	August 2, 2014	2	1:45	Ralston, Nebraska, United States	Catchweight (150 lb) bout.
Loss	35–16–1	Estevan Payan	Decision (unanimous)	Strikeforce: Rockhold vs. Jardine	January 7, 2012	3	5:00	Las Vegas, Nevada, United States	Catchweight (160 lb) bout.
Win	35–15–1	Mario Ramos	Submission (verbal)	RFA 1	December 16, 2011	1	0:20	Kearney, Nebraska, United States	Catchweight (160 lb) bout.
Win	34–15–1	Charon Spain	Decision (unanimous)	Extreme Challenge 200	November 23, 2011	3	5:00	Council Bluffs, Iowa, United States	
Loss	33–15–1	Porfirio Alves Jr.	Decision (unanimous)	Superior Cage Combat 3	November 4, 2011	3	5:00	Las Vegas, Nevada, United States	Catchweight (160 lb) bout.
Win	33–14–1	Ryan Bixler	Submission (rear-naked choke)	Cornhusker Fight Club 7	October 28, 2011	1	2:26	Lincoln, Nebraska, United States	
Win	32–14–1	Ted Worthington	Decision (unanimous)	Disorderly Conduct 3	August 19, 2011	3	5:00	Omaha, Nebraska, United States	
Win	31–14–1	Abel Trujillo	Technical Submission (guillotine choke)	Extreme Challenge 181	April 15, 2011	1	3:30	Council Bluffs, Iowa, United States	
Win	30–14–1	Aaron Derrow	Decision (majority)	Titan FC 17	March 25, 2011	3	5:00	Kansas City, Kansas, United States	Catchweight (163 lb) bout.
Win	29–14–1	Deryck Ripley	Submission (rear-naked choke)	Titan FC 16	January 28, 2011	2	2:19	Kansas City, Kansas, United States	Catchweight (165 lb) bout.
Win	28–14–1	Rod Montoya	Submission (rear-naked choke)	Extreme Challenge 162	October 1, 2010	1	4:13	Council Bluffs, Iowa, United States	
Loss	27–14–1	Lloyd Woodard	Submission (rear-naked choke)	Extreme Challenge: High Stakes	July 16, 2010	1	4:15	Council Bluffs, Iowa, United States	
Win	27–13–1	Travis Perzynski	Decision (unanimous)	Rochester Gladiators 2	May 15, 2010	3	5:00	Rochester, Minnesota, United States	
Win	26–13–1	Demi Deeds	Submission (rear-naked choke)	Ring of Fire 37	March 5, 2010	1	4:54	Omaha, Nebraska, United States	
Win	25–13–1	Paul Bird	Submission (rear-naked choke)	Midwest Cage 24	January 16, 2010	1	3:44	Des Moines, Iowa, United States	
Win	24–13–1	Ryan Williams	Decision (unanimous)	Adrenaline MMA 4	September 18, 2009	3	5:00	Council Bluffs, Iowa, United States	
Win	23–13–1	Victor Meza	Submission (rear-naked choke)	Bellator 7	May 15, 2009	2	2:43	Chicago, Illinois, United States	
Loss	22–13–1	Toby Imada	Submission (rear-naked choke)	Bellator 1	April 3, 2009	1	3:26	Hollywood, Florida, United States	
Draw	22–12–1	Joe Brammer	Draw	Glory FC 5	November 22, 2008	3	5:00	Alabama, United States	
Loss	22–12	Yaotzin Meza	Submission (guillotine choke)	Evolution MMA 1	October 4, 2008	2	2:08	Phoenix, Arizona, United States	
Win	22–11	Brandon Melendez	Submission (guillotine choke)	Victory FC 24	July 26, 2008	2	N/A	Council Bluffs, Iowa, United States	
Win	21–11	Ted Worthington	Decision (unanimous)	Victory FC 22	February 29, 2008	3	5:00	Council Bluffs, Iowa, United States	
Loss	20–11	Yves Edwards	Submission (rear-naked choke)	HDNet Fights: Reckless Abandon	December 15, 2007	2	3:04	Dallas, Texas, United States	
Win	20–10	Ryan Roberts	Submission	Victory FC 20	September 7, 2007	1	N/A	Council Bluffs, Iowa, United States	
Win	19–10	Waylon Lowe	TKO (submission to punches)	Fightfest 12	May 12, 2007	1	3:07	Canton, Ohio, United States	
Win	18–10	Dustin Neace	TKO (submission to punches)	Glory FC 1	April 20, 2007	1	1:10	Des Moines, Iowa, United States	
Win	17–10	John Owens	Submission (rear-naked choke)	Victory FC 18	February 16, 2007	1	2:18	Council Bluffs, Iowa, United States	
Win	16–10	Vadim Ivanov	TKO (punches)	Fightfest 10	November 25, 2006	2	1:12	Cleveland, Ohio, United States	
Win	15–10	Mike Bogner	Submission (triangle choke)	Fightfest 8	October 20, 2006	1	4:20	Cleveland, Ohio, United States	
Win	14–10	Luke Caudillo	Submission (guillotine choke)	Victory FC 16	September 9, 2006	2	N/A	Council Bluffs, Iowa, United States	
Loss	13–10	Clay French	Submission (rear-naked choke)	Extreme Challenge 70	August 26, 2006	1	3:34	Hayward, Wisconsin, United States	
Win	13–9	Alex Carter	Submission (neck crank)	Midwest Cage 4	July 15, 2006	2	0:22	Des Moines, Iowa, United States	
Win	12–9	Rocky Long	Decision (unanimous)	Diesel FC 1	June 30, 2006	3	5:00	Dallas, Texas, United States	
Loss	11–9	Luke Caudillo	TKO (punches)	Victory FC 13	May 13, 2006	2	4:59	North Platte, Nebraska, United States	
Win	11–8	Mike Schoech	KO (knee)	All FC 6	March 24, 2006	N/A	N/A	Omaha, Nebraska, United States	
Win	10–8	Kendrick Johnson	TKO (submission to punches)	Victory FC 12	February 25, 2006	1	N/A	Council Bluffs, Iowa, United States	
Win	9–8	Rob Marcks	TKO (punches)	All FC 5	January 6, 2006	2	N/A	Omaha, Nebraska, United States	
Win	8–8	Nathan Hardin	KO (punch)	All FC 4	November 18, 2005	1	1:11	Omaha, Nebraska, United States	
Win	7–8	Brian Dunn	Submission (rear-naked choke)	All FC 3	September 24, 2005	1	2:45	Omaha, Nebraska, United States	
Loss	6–8	Alvin Robinson	Submission (rear-naked choke)	Ring of Fire 19	September 10, 2005	2	1:14	Castle Rock, Colorado, United States	Return to Lightweight.
Win	6–7	Sean Huffman	Submission (rear-naked choke)	Victory FC 10	August 6, 2005	1	4:48	Council Bluffs, Iowa, United States	Featherweight debut.
Loss	5–7	Hector Munoz	Submission (armbar)	Inferno Promotions: Meltdown 2	July 22, 2005	1	0:43	Plano, Texas, United States	
Loss	5–6	Donnie Liles	Submission (rear-naked choke)	Ring of Fire 17	June 18, 2005	1	4:17	Castle Rock, Colorado, United States	Welterweight bout.
Win	5–5	Nick Dolucre	TKO (punches)	All FC 2	June 11, 2005	1	4:40	Omaha, Nebraska, United States	
Loss	4–5	Clay Guida	Submission (arm-triangle choke)	Xtreme Kage Kombat: Des Moines	May 20, 2005	3	3:22	Des Moines, Iowa, United States	
Win	4–4	Joe Mabin	TKO (submission to punches)	Xtreme Kage Kombat: Des Moines	May 20, 2005	1	N/A	Des Moines, Iowa, United States	
Win	3–4	Rob Marcks	TKO (submission to punches)	All FC 1	April 9, 2005	N/A	N/A	Omaha, Nebraska, United States	
Win	2–4	Jake Hudson	KO (punches)	Victory FC 9	March 5, 2005	1	N/A	Council Bluffs, Iowa, United States	Return to Lightweight.
Loss	1–4	Victor Moreno	TKO (punches)	Extreme Challenge 57	May 6, 2004	1	4:49	Council Bluffs, Iowa, United States	
Loss	1–3	Victor Moreno	N/A	Point of Impact 1	March 26, 2004	1	N/A	Des Moines, Iowa, United States	Welterweight debut.
Loss	1–2	Jason Ireland	Submission (rear-naked choke)	Victory FC 6	November 22, 2003	2	2:41	Council Bluffs, Iowa, United States	
Win	1–1	Luke Caudillo	TKO (corner stoppage)	Victory FC 6	November 22, 2003	3	2:32	Council Bluffs, Iowa, United States	
Loss	0–1	Demi Deeds	TKO (punches)	Gladiators 20	March 15, 2003	1	4:02	Des Moines, Iowa, United States	Lightweight debut.

== Amateur mixed martial arts record ==
Professional record breakdown
3 matches	2 wins	0 losses
By knockout	1	0
By submission	1	0
By decision	0	0
No contests	1	

Res.	Record	Opponent	Method	Event	Date	Round	Time	Location	Notes
Win	2–0 (1)	Ali ILeiwi	TKO (punches)	Xtreme Fight Championship 1	February 19, 2005	1	N/A	Tyler, Texas, United States	
NC	1–0 (1)	Demi Deeds	No Contest	THFC - Ground Zero 3	May 16, 2003	3	N/A	Des Moines, Iowa, United States	
Win	1–0	Enoch Wilson	Submission (punches)	THFC - Ground Zero 2	January 11, 2003	1	N/A	Des Moines, Iowa, United States	MMA debut (amateur)

== Bare-knuckle boxing record ==
Professional record breakdown
6 matches	5 wins	1 loss
By knockout	3	1
By decision	2	0

Res.	Record	Opponent	Method	Event	Date	Round	Time	Location	Notes
Win	5–1	Zeb Vincent	KO	BKFC Fight Night Sturgis: Acheson vs. Jones	August 8, 2026	2	0:53	Sturgis, South Dakota, United States	
Win	4–1	Kurtis Ellis	Decision (unanimous)	BKFC Fight Night Omaha: Cochrane vs. Edwards	April 18, 2025	5	2:00	Omaha, Nebraska, United States	
Loss	3–1	Stanislav Grosu	TKO	BKFC Fight Night Omaha: Trinidad-Snake vs. Pague	May 17, 2024	2	1:24	Omaha, Nebraska, United States	
Win	3–0	Jeremy Sauceda	TKO (corner stoppage)	BKFC 43	May 19, 2023	4	2:00	Omaha, Nebraska, United States	
Win	2–0	Jordan Christensen	Decision (unanimous)	BKFC 33	November 18, 2022	5	2:00	Omaha, Nebraska, United States	
Win	1–0	Adalberto Serrano	KO (punch)	BKFC Fight Night Omaha: Cochrane vs. Dyer	May 13, 2022	1	0:34	Omaha, Nebraska, United States	

== See also ==
- List of male mixed martial artists
