= Grudge Training Center =

Mixed martial arts training organization in Colorado

- Est.: 2009 (start); 2016 (defunct)
- Founded by: Trevor Wittman
- Primary trainers: Trevor Wittman, Jake Ramos, Luke Caudillo
- Training facilities: Arvada, Colorado
- Website: http://grudgetrainingcenter.com

Grudge Training Center (GTC) was a mixed martial arts training center founded by coach Trevor Wittman in 2009. Originally located in Wheat Ridge, Colorado, GTC relocated to Arvada, Colorado in 2013. The gym was an affiliate of Jackson's Submission Fighting. Wittman closed Grudge in November 2016.

== Notable fighters ==
- Rose Namajunas (United States) – Former 2x UFC Women's Strawweight Champion
- Nate Marquardt (United States) – UFC
- Pat Barry (United States) – UFC
- Justin Gaethje (United States) – UFC Current Lightweight champion
- Brandon Girtz (United States) – Bellator
- Justin Salas (United States) – UFC
- Luke Caudillo (United States) – Strikeforce, UFC
- Tyler Stinson (United States) – Bellator, Strikeforce
- Brandon Thatch (United States) – UFC
- Justin Wren (United States) – Bellator
- Shane Carwin (United States) – Former UFC Interim Heavyweight champion
- Rashad Evans (United States) – UFC Hall of Famer, Former UFC Light-Heavyweight champion, TUF 2 Heavyweight Champion
- Duane Ludwig (United States) – UFC
- Ed Herman (United States) – UFC
- Todd Duffee (United States) – UFC
- Melvin Guillard (United States) – UFC
- Brendan Schaub (United States) – runner-up on The Ultimate Fighter: Heavyweights
- Jon Jones (United States) – UFC Former Heavyweight & Light-Heavyweight Champion
- Gerald Harris (United States) – WSOF
- John Howard (United States) – UFC
- Jared Hamman (United States) – UFC
- Tyler Toner (United States) – UFC
- James McSweeney (United States) – UFC
- Paul Buentello (United States) – Bellator, Shark Fights
- Cody Donovan (United States) – UFC
- Eliot Marshall (United States) – UFC
- Alvin Robinson (United States) – UFC

Notable and recurring trainees under Trevor Wittman

- Stipe Miocic (United States) – UFC Former Heavyweight Champion
- Neil Magny (United States) – UFC
- Donald Cerrone (United States) – UFC
- Georges St-Pierre (Canada) – Former UFC Welterweight & Middleweight Champion
