= Nate Mohr =

American surgeon and mixed martial artist (born 1983)

- Born: March 3, 1983 (age 43); Davenport, Iowa, United States
- Height: 5 ft 9 in (1.75 m)
- Weight: 155 lb (70 kg; 11.1 st)
- Division: Lightweight
- Fighting out of: Crystal Lake, Illinois
- Team: Team Curran
- Years active: 2003–2009

Mixed martial arts record
- Total: 16
- Wins: 9
- By knockout: 8
- By decision: 1
- Losses: 7
- By knockout: 1
- By submission: 5
- By decision: 1

Amateur record
- Total: 1
- Wins: 1
- By submission: 1

Other information
- Mixed martial arts record from Sherdog

Nate Mohr (born March 3, 1983) is an American surgeon and former mixed martial artist. He competed professionally from 2003 to 2009 and fought in the lightweight division of the Ultimate Fighting Championship (UFC) from 2007 to 2009, compiling an overall record of nine wins and seven losses.

== Mixed martial arts career ==
=== Early career ===
Mohr made his professional mixed martial arts debut on August 15, 2003, facing Cain Rizzo at Extreme Challenge 52. He won the fight by technical knockout in the second round. He also competed in one amateur bout, defeating Tyler Combs by guillotine choke at XFO 6 on June 25, 2005.

=== Ultimate Fighting Championship ===
With a record of 7–3, Mohr signed with the UFC in early 2007. He made his debut against Kurt Pellegrino at UFC Fight Night 9 on April 5, 2007. He lost by Achilles lock submission. Mohr then faced Luke Caudillo at UFC Fight Night 10 on June 12, 2007, winning by unanimous decision in what proved to be his only victory in the promotion.

Mohr was expected to face Jeremy Stephens at UFC 76 on September 22, 2007. However, he was forced out of the bout with an injury and was replaced by Diego Saraiva. For his third fight in the promotion, he faced Manvel Gamburyan at UFC 79 on December 29, 2007. He lost by Achilles lock in the first round.

Returning from a one-year layoff caused by a torn posterior cruciate ligament, Mohr faced Dennis Siver at UFC 93 on January 17, 2009. He lost the fight by technical knockout after being dropped by a spinning back kick, and, having fallen to 1–3 in the promotion, was subsequently released.

=== Post-UFC career ===
Mohr faced Danny Rodriguez at XFO 28 on February 27, 2009, winning by technical knockout.

In what proved to be his final fight, Mohr faced Lenny Lovato at GFC 2: Unstoppable on June 19, 2009, losing by unanimous decision.

== Medical career ==
After leaving mixed martial arts, Mohr studied medicine at Chicago Medical School of Rosalind Franklin University of Medicine and Science and entered a general surgery residency at Iowa Methodist Medical Center in Des Moines, Iowa, where he was working as of 2023. He subsequently joined UnityPoint Health as a general surgeon in the Quad Cities.

== Mixed martial arts record ==
Professional record breakdown
16 matches	9 wins	7 losses
By knockout	8	1
By submission	0	5
By decision	1	1

Res.	Record	Opponent	Method	Event	Date	Round	Time	Location	Notes
Loss	9–7	Lenny Lovato	Decision (unanimous)	GFC 2 - Unstoppable	June 19, 2009	3	5:00	Albuquerque, New Mexico, United States	
Win	9–6	Danny Rodriguez	TKO (punches)	XFO - Xtreme Fighting Organization 28	February 27, 2009	3	4:07	Lakemoor, Illinois, United States	
Loss	8–6	Dennis Siver	TKO (spinning back kick and punches)	UFC 93	January 17, 2009	3	3:27	Dublin, Ireland	
Loss	8–5	Manvel Gamburyan	Submission (Achilles lock)	UFC 79	December 29, 2007	1	1:31	Las Vegas, Nevada, United States	
Win	8–4	Luke Caudillo	Decision (unanimous)	UFC Fight Night 10	June 12, 2007	3	5:00	Hollywood, Florida, United States	
Loss	7–4	Kurt Pellegrino	Submission (Achilles lock)	UFC Fight Night 9	April 5, 2007	1	2:58	Las Vegas, Nevada, United States	
Win	7–3	Cody Shipp	TKO (punches)	KOTC: Hard Knocks	January 19, 2007	1	2:59	Rockford, Illinois, United States	
Win	6–3	Norm Alexander	TKO (punches)	XFO 13 - Operation Beatdown	November 11, 2006	2	1:30	Hoffman Estates, Illinois, United States	
Win	5–3	Darren Cotton	TKO (punches)	XFO 12 - Outdoor War 2	August 19, 2006	2	0:19	Island Lake, Illinois, United States	
Win	4–3	Alex Carter	TKO (punches)	XFO 11 - Champions	June 17, 2006	1	0:29	Lakemoor, Illinois, United States	
Loss	3–3	Donald Cerrone	Submission (triangle choke)	ROF 21 - Full Blast	February 11, 2006	1	1:42	Castle Rock, Colorado, United States	
Loss	3–2	Jay Ellis	Submission (rear-naked choke)	XFO - Xtreme Fighting Organization 9	January 28, 2006	1	3:37	Lakemoor, Illinois, United States	
Win	3–1	Enrique Guzman	TKO (punches)	Combat - Do Fighting Challenge 4	August 13, 2005	1	N/A	Illinois, United States	
Win	2–1	Don Hamilton	TKO (submission to punches)	IC 15 - Iowa Challenge 15	October 16, 2004	1	1:19	Waterloo, Iowa, United States	
Loss	1–1	John Strawn	Submission (rear-naked choke)	EC 53 - Extreme Challenge 53	September 13, 2003	2	2:28	Iowa City, Iowa, United States	
Win	1–0	Cain Rizzo	TKO (submission to punches)	EC 52 - Extreme Challenge 52	August 15, 2003	2	2:15	Rock Island, Illinois, United States	

== Amateur mixed martial arts record ==
Professional record breakdown
1 match	1 win	0 losses
By knockout	0	0
By submission	1	0
By decision	0	0

Res.	Record	Opponent	Method	Event	Date	Round	Time	Location	Notes
Win	1–0	Tyler Combs	Submission (guillotine choke)	XFO 6: Judgement Day	June 25, 2005	1	2:58	Lakemoor, Illinois, United States	
