= Strikeforce: Rockhold vs. Jardine =

Strikeforce mixed martial arts event in 2012

- The poster for Strikeforce: Rockhold vs. Jardine
- Promotion: Strikeforce
- Date: January 7, 2012
- Venue: Hard Rock Hotel and Casino
- City: Paradise, Nevada, United States
- Attendance: 1,992
- Total gate: $68,805

Event chronology
Strikeforce: Melendez vs. Masvidal	Strikeforce: Rockhold vs. Jardine	Strikeforce: Tate vs. Rousey

Strikeforce: Rockhold vs. Jardine was a mixed martial arts event held by Strikeforce. The event took place on January 7, 2012, at the Hard Rock Hotel and Casino in Paradise, Nevada, part of the Las Vegas Metropolitan Area, United States.

== Background ==
Beginning with this event, the preliminary matches aired live on the Showtime Extreme channel prior to the main card airing on Showtime.

Miesha Tate was expected to defend her Women's Bantamweight Championship in a rematch with former champion Sarah Kaufman on this card, but the bout never materialized.

Luke Rockhold was expected to defend his Strikeforce Middleweight Championship against Tim Kennedy at this event, though an injury left Kennedy unable to compete at this event, and he was replaced by Keith Jardine in his middleweight debut. The Rockhold/Kennedy bout was rescheduled for Strikeforce: Rockhold vs. Kennedy that July, where Rockhold defended his title via unanimous decision.

Bobby Green was originally scheduled to face Strikeforce newcomer Alonzo Martinez at this event, but had to withdraw due to an injury. He was replaced by Estevan Payan, also making his promotional debut.

== Results ==
Main card (Showtime)
Weight class				Method	Round	Time	Notes
Middleweight	Luke Rockhold (c)	def.	Keith Jardine	TKO (punches)	1	4:26	(Note: For the Strikeforce Middleweight Championship.)
Light Heavyweight	Muhammed Lawal	vs.	Lorenz Larkin	No Contest (overturned)	2	1:32	(Note: Originally a KO (punches) win for Lawal. later changed to no contest by the Nevada State Athletic Commission after Lawal subsequently tested positive for Drostanolone in a post-fight drug test.)
Middleweight	Robbie Lawler	def.	Adlan Amagov	TKO (flying knee and punches)	1	1:48
Welterweight	Tyron Woodley	def.	Jordan Mein	Decision (split) (28–29, 29–28, 30–27)	3	5:00
Preliminary card (Showtime Extreme)
Welterweight	Tarec Saffiedine	def.	Tyler Stinson	Decision (split) (28–29, 30–27, 29–28)	3	5:00
Catchweight (160 lb)	Estevan Payan	def.	Alonzo Martinez	Decision (unanimous) (30–27, 30–27, 30–27)	3	5:00
Lightweight	Ricky Legere	def.	Chris Spang	Decision (unanimous) (29–28, 29–28, 29–28)	3	5:00
Light Heavyweight	Gian Villante	def.	Trevor Smith	TKO (punches)	1	1:05
Welterweight	Nah-Shon Burrell	def.	James Terry	Decision (split) (29–28, 28–29, 29–28)	3	5:00

== Salaries ==
- Luke Rockhold: $90,000 (Includes $25,000 win bonus)
- Keith Jardine: $30,000
- Robbie Lawler: $150,000
- Adlan Amagov: $10,000
- Muhammed Lawal: $95,000(Includes $15,000 win bonus)
- Lorenz Larkin: $17,000
- Tyron Woodley: $60,000(Includes $30,000 win bonus)
- Jordan Mein: $9,000
- Tarec Saffiedine: $31,000 (Includes $15,500 win bonus)
- Tyler Stinson: $4,000
- Nah-Shon Burrell: $8,000 (Includes $4,000 win bonus)
- James Terry: $9,000
- Gian Villante: $20,000 (Includes $10,000 win bonus)
- Trevor Smith: $4,000
- Ricky Legere Jr.: $10,000(Includes $5,000 win bonus)
- Christopher Spang: $6,000
- Estevan Payan: $8,000 (Includes $4,000 win bonus)
- Alonzo Martinez: $5,000
