= UFC Fight Night: Stout vs. Fisher =

UFC mixed martial arts event in 2007

- The poster for UFC Fight Night: Stout vs. Fisher
- Promotion: Ultimate Fighting Championship
- Date: June 12, 2007
- Venue: Seminole Hard Rock Hotel and Casino
- City: Hollywood, Florida

Event chronology
UFC 71: Liddell vs. Jackson	UFC Fight Night: Stout vs. Fisher	UFC 72: Victory

UFC Fight Night: Stout vs. Fisher (also known as UFC Fight Night 10) was a mixed martial arts event held by the Ultimate Fighting Championship on Tuesday, June 12, 2007, at the Seminole Hard Rock Hotel and Casino in Hollywood, Florida.

== Background ==
This event was broadcast live in the United States and Canada on Spike TV.

The main event featured lightweights Sam Stout and Spencer Fisher in a rematch from their first fight at UFC 58: USA vs. Canada, which Stout won by split decision. Fisher had accepted that match on very short notice and was forced to lose a considerable amount of weight – in the range of 20 pounds – in order of to make the lightweight limit of 155 lb (70 kg).

The event drew a 1.2 rating, collecting 1.6 million television viewers, according to Nielson Media Research.

== Results ==
Main card (Spike TV)
Weight class				Method	Round	Time	Notes
Lightweight	Spencer Fisher	def.	Sam Stout	Decision (unanimous) (30–27, 30–27, 30–27)	3	5:00
Lightweight	Thiago Tavares	def.	Jason Black	Submission (triangle choke)	2	2:49
Welterweight	Jon Fitch	def.	Roan Carneiro	Submission (rear-naked choke)	2	1:07
Middleweight	Drew McFedries	def.	Jordan Radev	KO (punches)	1	0:33
Preliminary card
Welterweight	Forrest Petz	def.	Luigi Fioravanti	Decision (unanimous) (29–28, 30–27, 29–28)	3	5:00
Welterweight	Tamdan McCrory	def.	Pete Spratt	Submission (triangle choke)	2	2:04
Lightweight	Gleison Tibau	def.	Jeff Cox	Submission (arm-triangle choke)	1	1:52
Welterweight	Anthony Johnson	def.	Chad Reiner	KO (punches)	1	0:13	(Note: This preliminary bout was aired on the broadcast after the McFedries-Radev fight.)
Lightweight	Nate Mohr	def.	Luke Caudillo	Decision (unanimous) (29–28, 30–27, 29–28)	3	5:00

== Bonus awards ==
The following fighters received $30,000 bonuses.

- Fight of the Night: Spencer Fisher vs. Sam Stout
- Knockout of the Night: Drew McFedries
- Submission of the Night: Thiago Tavares

== See also ==
- Ultimate Fighting Championship
- List of UFC champions
- List of UFC events
- 2007 in UFC
