= Thiago Alves (fighter) =

Brazilian mixed martial arts fighter (born 1983)

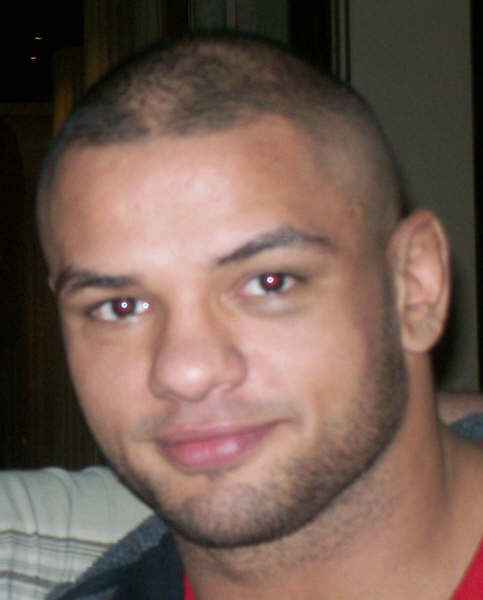
- Born: Thiago Alves; 3 October 1983 (age 43); Fortaleza, Brazil
- Other names: Pitbull
- Height: 5 ft 10 in (178 cm)
- Weight: 174 lb (79 kg; 12 st 6 lb)
- Division: Welterweight; Lightweight
- Reach: 68 in (173 cm)
- Fighting out of: Coconut Creek, Florida, United States
- Team: American Top Team
- Rank: Brown belt in Brazilian Jiu-Jitsu
- Years active: 2001–2019

Mixed martial arts record
- Total: 38
- Wins: 23
- By knockout: 13
- By submission: 1
- By decision: 9
- Losses: 15
- By knockout: 3
- By submission: 5
- By decision: 7

Amateur record
- Total: 2
- Wins: 2
- By knockout: 1

Other information
- Mixed martial arts record from Sherdog

Thiago Alves (Brazilian Portuguese pronunciation: [tʃiˈaɡu ˈawvis]; born 3 October 1983) is a Brazilian former bare-knuckle fighter and former mixed martial artist. A 27-fight veteran of the Ultimate Fighting Championship, he competed in the promotion from 2005 until 2019. Aside from being a professional fighter, Alves has been a striking coach at the American Top Team since 2017.

== Background ==
Born and raised in Fortaleza, Brazil, Alves began training in Muay Thai at the age of 15 in order to get in better shape before transitioning to mixed martial arts at the age of 17. Alves won his first MMA bout as an amateur at just 15 years old, defeating a 25-year-old competitor by unanimous decision. At 19, Alves relocated from Brazil to Coconut Creek, Florida to train full-time at the prestigious American Top Team camp.

== Mixed martial arts career ==
=== Ultimate Fighting Championship ===
Alves, with a record of 8–3, received an invitation to make his UFC debut at Ultimate Fight Night 2 against fellow UFC newcomer Spencer Fisher. The fight would take place on Alves' twenty-second birthday. Despite having early success in the bout, especially on the ground, Alves fell victim to a triangle choke late in the second round.

Thiago returned to action on the undercard of UFC 56, defeating previously-undefeated Ansar Chalangov by TKO due to punches at 2:25 into the first round.

At UFC 59, Thiago was matched up against Derrick Noble, a fighter he had previously lost to by (rear-naked choke). The two fighters were both aggressive on the feet, in which Alves was forced to cover up after getting rocked with a flurry by Noble. Looking to capitalize, Noble rushed in when Alves caught him with a perfectly timed counterpunch that dropped him and led to Alves scoring a TKO victory.

At Ultimate Fight Night 5, Alves was matched up against fellow up-and-comer Jon Fitch. In a match-up of two future top welterweight contenders, Fitch defeated Alves via TKO at 4:37 into the second round after landing a flush upkick to the face of Alves which dropped him and led to Fitch finishing the fight with strikes.

Alves returned to his winning ways at Ortiz vs. Shamrock 3 - The Final Chapter, defeating veteran John Alessio by unanimous decision.

"Pitbull" completed a busy 2006, during which he fought four times. At UFC 66, he dominated Tony DeSouza, knocking out the jiu-jitsu black belt with a knee in the second round. Following his victory, it was announced that Alves tested positive for a diuretic, spironolactone, which he supposedly used to help him lose water weight in order to make the 170-pound limit. As a result of the failed drug test, Alves was suspended eight months by the Nevada State Athletic Commission and fined $5,500.

Alves returned at UFC Fight Night 11, where he knocked out Japanese fighter Kuniyoshi Hironaka with a punch and knee in the second round. Less than two months later, Alves faced off against veteran contender Chris Lytle at UFC 78. After an exciting stand-up battle, doctors halted the bout at the end of the second round because of a cut above the eye of Lytle, declaring Alves the winner by doctor stoppage. The bout earned both fighters Fight of the Night bonus award.

In his first bout of 2008 at UFC Fight Night 13, Alves faced his biggest test to date, as he was matched up against welterweight contender Karo Parisyan. After resisting any attempts to grapple but failing to amount any significant offense during the stand-up exchanges throughout the first round, "The Pitbull" scored a knee to the head of Parisyan, knocking down the judo expert before finishing him on the ground with strikes.

=== Rising up the welterweight ranks ===
Once again taking just two months between bouts, Alves accepted a fight against former UFC Welterweight Champion Matt Hughes, a fighter widely considered the most dominant champion in UFC history. The Welterweight bout, which served as the main event of UFC 85 in London, was scheduled as a late replacement after Chuck Liddell had to pull out of his headliner fight against Rashad Evans with a hamstring injury.

Prior to the bout, Alves surprised many by missing weight for the welterweight bout—coming in at 174 pounds. Despite his opponent missing the 170-pound limit, Hughes accepted the fight at a catchweight. Despite the pre-fight blunder, Alves shocked the crowd by dominating the heavily favored former champion. After picking apart Hughes standing and displaying vastly-improved takedown defense throughout the first round, "The Pitbull" knocked Hughes down with a flying knee and followed him to the ground with punches early in the second, earning a TKO stoppage. This win earned Alves his first Knockout of the Night bonus award. In the post fight interview, Alves attributed not making weight to spraining his ankle two weeks before the fight.

Next, Alves was slated to face Diego Sanchez at UFC 90, in what many believed would be a match for the number-one contender spot. Sanchez, however, would be forced to pull out of the bout just weeks before the event due to injury.

Josh Koscheck, another top-contender and four-time NCAA wrestling All-American, stepped in for Sanchez on short notice. Alves controlled most of the fight and won via unanimous decision (30–27, 29–28, and 30–27). The Brazilian's improved takedown-defense was once again on display, as the American Top Team fighter forced Koscheck into a kick boxing battle. Alves' devastating leg kicks proved to be a factor throughout the bout, taking away much of Koscheck's mobility. He also managed to drop Koscheck several times during the 3-round bout, but Koscheck's quick recovery enabled him to survive the onslaughts.

=== Welterweight title shot ===
With his impressive victory over Koscheck, Alves was on a 7-fight win streak, winning 9 of his past 10 bouts. After consecutive dominant performances against Parisyan, Hughes and Koscheck, Dana White announced that Alves had earned a title shot against the winner of the welterweight title-fight at UFC 94. After Georges St-Pierre defended his title at UFC 94, Alves entered the ring to congratulate him. St. Pierre said that he was looking forward to facing Alves in the cage. Thiago Alves fought Georges St-Pierre for the welterweight title at the Mandalay Bay in Las Vegas on 11 July 2009 at UFC 100. During the fight, Alves was taken down a total of ten times. Although he showed potential on his feet and put in a resilient performance on the ground, continually getting back up, he was ultimately subjected to a clinic put on by St. Pierre and being outwrestled in all five rounds ultimately losing via unanimous decision (50–45, 50–44, and 50–45).

=== Post-title shot ===
Alves was scheduled to face Jon Fitch at UFC 107 in a rematch of their bout at UFC Ultimate Fight Night 5. However Alves suffered a knee injury, forcing him to withdrawfrom the fight. Alves was then scheduled to face Fitch on 27 March 2010 at UFC 111. However, on 25 March, Alves was taken off the card due to the discovery of an arteriovenous malformation in the brain from a pre fight CAT scan. Alves had the corrective surgery on 31 March 2010 at Roosevelt Hospital in New York. He took leave of absence, staying in New Jersey with his wife, Melissa Farrand Alves, and was expected to fight again during the summer of 2010.

The Alves/Fitch rematch, originally slated for UFC 107, then UFC 111, then UFC 115, finally took place at UFC 117. This fight was confirmed to be the number one contendership for the welterweight championship (to fight the winner of the St-Pierre/Koscheck bout). Alves again failed to make weight, weighing in at 171.5 lb, meaning he had to give up 20% of his fight purse. Alves would go on to lose to Fitch via unanimous decision. Dana White stated in the post fight press conference that Alves could be moving to the middleweight division.

Days later, Alves said that he'd been given one more chance by the UFC to compete as a welterweight.

Alves faced John Howard on 11 December 2010 at UFC 124. Alves won by a dominant unanimous decision in one of his best performances in the UFC, out-striking and out-wrestling Howard and eventually getting a knockdown in the third round with a clean punch.

Following the victory over Howard, Alves lost to Rick Story on 28 May 2011 at UFC 130 via unanimous decision. Alves had a slow start to both the first and second round, during which Story pressured Alves against the cage but was unable to land any significant damage or takedowns. Alves managed to find his rhythm and began landing clean strikes that resulted in him winning the third round, however ended up losing 29–28 on all three judges' scorecards.

Alves faced promotional newcomer Papy Abedi at UFC 138. After exchanging hard leg and body kicks, and showing good takedown defence, Alves was able to land a two-punch combination that dropped Abedi, securing full mount and opening up a cut due to elbows. Displaying improved ground control, Alves defeated Abedi via submission (rear-naked choke) at 3:32 of round one to secure his first submission victory in the UFC (and first submission victory in his MMA career that wasn't due to strikes).

Alves faced Martin Kampmann on 3 March 2012 at UFC on FX 2. After avoiding takedowns and outstriking Kampmann for the majority of the fight, Alves was submitted in the final minute of the bout after being caught in a guillotine while trying to secure a takedown.

Alves was expected to face Japanese superstar Yoshihiro Akiyama on 21 July 2012 at UFC 149. However, Akiyama was forced out of the bout with an injury and replaced by Siyar Bahadurzada. Then on 1 June, Alves pulled out of the bout citing an injury and was replaced by Chris Clements.

Alves was expected to face Matt Brown on 17 August 2013 at UFC Fight Night 26. However, Alves pulled out of the bout citing another injury and was replaced by Mike Pyle.

After over two years away from the sport due to a litany of injuries and lengthy rehabilitations, Alves returned to face Seth Baczynski on 19 April 2014 at UFC on Fox 11. He won the fight via unanimous decision. The win also earned Alves his second Fight of the Night bonus award.

Alves was expected to face Jordan Mein on 23 August 2014 at UFC Fight Night 49. However, Alves pulled out of the bout citing yet another injury, and was replaced by Brandon Thatch. Subsequently, Thatch also pulled out of the bout with Mein citing a toe injury. The bout between Alves and Mein would later be rescheduled and eventually took place on 31 January 2015 at UFC 183. Alves won the fight via TKO in the second round, after hurting Mein with a brutal kick in the solar plexus and capitalizing with subsequent punches. This win also won Alves his first Performance of the Night bonus award.

Fighting twice in a year for the first time since 2011, Alves returned to face Carlos Condit on 30 May 2015 in the main event at UFC Fight Night 67. Alves lost the fight via TKO after the cage-side doctor ended the contest between the second and third round due to the amount of damage Alves had taken.

Alves was expected to face Benson Henderson on 28 November 2015 at UFC Fight Night 79. However, on 14 November, Alves pulled out the bout citing injury and was replaced by Jorge Masvidal.

Alves was expected to face Al Iaquinta in a lightweight bout on 12 November 2016 at UFC 205. However, Iaquinta announced on 19 September that he would not be taking the fight due to a contract dispute with the promotion. Alves was rescheduled to face Jim Miller at the event. At the weigh-ins, Alves missed weight by nearly seven pounds, weighing in at 162.6 lbs. Miller, who was already on weight, had to rehydrate to keep their weight difference within 7 pounds. Because of that, he came in at 157.6 lbs and the bout proceeded at catchweight. New York State Athletic Commission and UFC officials indicated that Alves must not weigh more than 173 lbs the day of the fight or the fight would be cancelled. As a result, Alves was fined 20% of his fight purse, which went to Miller. He lost the fight by unanimous decision.

After the failed attempt at lightweight, Alves returned to welterweight and faced Patrick Côté on 8 April 2017 at UFC 210. He won the fight by unanimous decision.

Alves was expected to face Mike Perry on 16 September 2017 at UFC Fight Night 116. However, Alves pulled out of the fight on 13 September for undisclosed reasons.

Alves was scheduled to face Zak Cummings on 14 January 2018 at UFC Fight Night: Stephens vs. Choi. On 13 January 2018, it was announced that Cummings injured his head after a bathroom slip and the bout against Alves was cancelled.

Alves faced promotional newcomer Curtis Millender on 18 February 2018 at UFC Fight Night 126. He lost the fight via technical knockout in the second round.

Alves faced promotional newcomer Alexey Kunchenko on 15 September 2018 at UFC Fight Night 136. He lost the fight by unanimous decision.

Alves faced Max Griffin at UFC Fight Night: Assunção vs. Moraes 2 on 2 February 2019. He won the back-and-forth fight via split decision.

Alves faced Laureano Staropoli at UFC 237 on 11 May 2019. He lost the fight via unanimous decision.

Alves was expected to face Gunnar Nelson on 28 September 2019 at UFC Fight Night 160. However, Alves pulled out of the fight in mid-September due to undisclosed injury.

Alves faced Tim Means on 7 December 2019 at UFC on ESPN 7. He lost the fight via a submission in round one.

On 11 January 2020 it was reported that Alves was released by the UFC.

== Bare-knuckle fighting ==
=== Bare Knuckle Fighting Championship ===
On 22 January 2020, news surfaced that Alves had signed a three-fight contract with Bare Knuckle Fighting Championship. He was expected to make his promotional debut against Phil Baroni, however Baroni was removed from the card as the organization could not reach him in timely fashion. Instead, he made his promotional debut against former contender from The Ultimate Fighter, Julian Lane, at BKFC 12 in Daytona Beach, FL on 11 September 2020 Alves won the fight by split decision.

==== BKFC Middleweight Champion ====
Alves then faced Ulysses Diaz for the inaugural middleweight championship at BKFC 18 on 26 June 2021. He claimed the championship via technical knockout after the ringside doctor stopped the bout after the third round.

His contract with BKFC expired on 12 May 2022, so he was stripped of the BKFC Middleweight Championship.

Alves faced "King of Violence" champion Mike Perry in the main event at BKFC Knucklemania IV on 27 April 2024, in Los Angeles. He lost in the first round by knockout. Alves announced his retirement from combat sports at the post-fight press conference.

== Personal life ==
Aside from his mixed martial arts athlete and coach careers, Alves was in the process of becoming a police officer in Florida. However, there are no plans to become a police officer as he will focus on his coaching at American Top Team and being a director for an online training platform called Life Training.

== Championships and accomplishments ==
=== Mixed martial arts ===
- Ultimate Fighting Championship
  - Fight of the Night (Two times) vs. Seth Baczynski & Chris Lytle
  - Performance of the Night (One time) vs. Jordan Mein
  - Knockout of the Night (One time) vs. Matt Hughes
  - Most knockdowns landed in UFC Welterweight division history (13)
  - Tied (Tim Means) for third most fights in UFC Welterweight division history (26)
  - Tied (Matt Hughes) for sixth most wins in UFC Welterweight division history (15)
  - Tied (Vicente Luque, Li Jingliang & Neil Magny) for second most knockouts in UFC Welterweight division history (8) (behind Matt Brown)
  - Fifth most finishes in UFC Welterweight division history (9)
  - Tied for fourth most consecutive knockouts in UFC history (5)
  - UFC.com Awards
    - 2008: Ranked #2 Fighter of the Year & Ranked #4 Knockout of the Year vs. Karo Parisyan & Matt Hughes
- Sports Illustrated
  - 2008 Most Improved Fighter of the Year
- MMA HQ
  - 2008 #2 Ranked Fighter of the Year

=== Bare-knuckle boxing ===
- Bare Knuckle Fighting Championship
  - BKFC Middleweight World Champion (inaugural)

== Mixed martial arts record ==
Professional record breakdown
38 matches	23 wins	15 losses
By knockout	13	3
By submission	1	5
By decision	9	7

Res.	Record	Opponent	Method	Event	Date	Round	Time	Location	Notes
Loss	23–15	Tim Means	Submission (guillotine choke)	UFC on ESPN: Overeem vs. Rozenstruik	7 December 2019	1	2:38	Washington, D.C., United States	
Loss	23–14	Laureano Staropoli	Decision (unanimous)	UFC 237	11 May 2019	3	5:00	Rio de Janeiro, Brazil	
Win	23–13	Max Griffin	Decision (split)	UFC Fight Night: Assunção vs. Moraes 2	2 February 2019	3	5:00	Fortaleza, Brazil	
Loss	22–13	Alexey Kunchenko	Decision (unanimous)	UFC Fight Night: Hunt vs. Oleinik	15 September 2018	3	5:00	Moscow, Russia	
Loss	22–12	Curtis Millender	KO (knee)	UFC Fight Night: Cowboy vs. Medeiros	18 February 2018	2	4:17	Austin, Texas, United States	
Win	22–11	Patrick Côté	Decision (unanimous)	UFC 210	8 April 2017	3	5:00	Buffalo, New York, United States	Return to Welterweight.
Loss	21–11	Jim Miller	Decision (unanimous)	UFC 205	12 November 2016	3	5:00	New York City, New York, United States	Lightweight debut; Alves missed weight (162.6 lbs). Changed to catchweight.
Loss	21–10	Carlos Condit	TKO (doctor stoppage)	UFC Fight Night: Condit vs. Alves	30 May 2015	2	5:00	Goiânia, Brazil	
Win	21–9	Jordan Mein	KO (body kick)	UFC 183	31 January 2015	2	0:39	Las Vegas, Nevada, United States	Performance of the Night.
Win	20–9	Seth Baczynski	Decision (unanimous)	UFC on Fox: Werdum vs. Browne	19 April 2014	3	5:00	Orlando, Florida, United States	Fight of the Night.
Loss	19–9	Martin Kampmann	Submission (guillotine choke)	UFC on FX: Alves vs. Kampmann	3 March 2012	3	4:12	Sydney, Australia	
Win	19–8	Papy Abedi	Submission (rear-naked choke)	UFC 138	5 November 2011	1	3:32	Birmingham, England	
Loss	18–8	Rick Story	Decision (unanimous)	UFC 130	28 May 2011	3	5:00	Las Vegas, Nevada, United States	
Win	18–7	John Howard	Decision (unanimous)	UFC 124	11 December 2010	3	5:00	Montreal, Quebec, Canada	
Loss	17–7	Jon Fitch	Decision (unanimous)	UFC 117	7 August 2010	3	5:00	Oakland, California, United States	Catchweight (171.5 lbs) bout. Alves missed weight.
Loss	17–6	Georges St-Pierre	Decision (unanimous)	UFC 100	11 July 2009	5	5:00	Las Vegas, Nevada, United States	For the UFC Welterweight Championship.
Win	17–5	Josh Koscheck	Decision (unanimous)	UFC 90	25 October 2008	3	5:00	Rosemont, Illinois, United States	UFC Welterweight Championship eliminator.
Win	16–5	Matt Hughes	TKO (flying knee and punches)	UFC 85	7 June 2008	2	1:02	London, England	Catchweight (174 lbs) bout. Alves missed weight. Knockout of the Night.
Win	15–5	Karo Parisyan	TKO (knee and punches)	UFC Fight Night: Florian vs. Lauzon	2 April 2008	2	0:34	Broomfield, Colorado, United States	
Win	14–5	Chris Lytle	TKO (doctor stoppage)	UFC 78	17 November 2007	2	5:00	Newark, New Jersey, United States	Fight of the Night.
Win	13–5	Kuniyoshi Hironaka	TKO (punch and knee)	UFC Fight Night: Thomas vs. Florian	19 September 2007	2	4:04	Las Vegas, Nevada, United States	
Win	12–5	Tony DeSouza	KO (knee)	UFC 66	30 December 2006	2	1:10	Las Vegas, Nevada, United States	Alves tested positive for banned diuretics.
Win	11–5	John Alessio	Decision (unanimous)	Ortiz vs. Shamrock 3: The Final Chapter	10 October 2006	3	5:00	Hollywood, Florida, United States	
Loss	10–5	Jon Fitch	TKO (upkick and punches)	UFC Fight Night 5	28 June 2006	2	4:37	Las Vegas, Nevada, United States	
Win	10–4	Derrick Noble	TKO (punches)	UFC 59	15 April 2006	1	2:54	Anaheim, California, United States	
Win	9–4	Ansar Chalangov	TKO (punches)	UFC 56	19 November 2005	1	2:25	Las Vegas, Nevada, United States	
Loss	8–4	Spencer Fisher	Submission (triangle choke)	UFC Fight Night 2	3 October 2005	2	4:43	Las Vegas, Nevada, United States	
Win	8–3	Jeff Cox	KO (knee and punches)	KOTC 48: Payback	25 February 2005	1	0:15	Cleveland, Ohio, United States	
Win	7–3	Jason Chambers	TKO (submission to punches)	IHC 8: Ethereal	20 November 2004	1	4:57	Hammond, Indiana, United States	
Win	6–3	Nuri Shakir	Decision (unanimous)	Absolute Fighting Championships 7	27 February 2004	2	5:00	Fort Lauderdale, Florida, United States	
Loss	5–3	Derrick Noble	Submission (rear-naked choke)	Absolute Fighting Championships 6	6 December 2003	2	2:13	Fort Lauderdale, Florida, United States	
Win	5–2	Marcus Davis	Decision (split)	Hardcore Fighting Championships 2	18 October 2003	3	5:00	Revere, Massachusetts, United States	
Win	4–2	Mike Littlefield	TKO (punches)	Mass Destruction 12	16 August 2003	2	0:50	Taunton, Massachusetts, United States	
Win	3–2	Carlos Alexandre Pereira	TKO (doctor stoppage)	Bitetti Combat Nordeste 2	20 March 2003	2	N/A	Natal, Brazil	
Win	2–2	Fabio Holanda	Decision (unanimous)	Bitetti Combat Nordeste 1	28 November 2002	3	5:00	Natal, Brazil	
Win	1–2	Wilson Belchoir	KO (punch)	Champions Night 3	8 October 2001	1	N/A	Brazil	
Loss	0–2	Lucas Lopes	Decision (unanimous)	X: Fight	28 September 2001	3	5:00	João Pessoa, Brazil	
Loss	0–1	Gleison Tibau	Submission (armbar)	Champions Night 2	30 June 2001	2	3:31	Fortaleza, Brazil	

== Bare knuckle record ==
Professional record breakdown
3 matches	2 wins	1 loss
By knockout	1	1
By decision	1	0

Res.	Record	Opponent	Method	Event	Date	Round	Time	Location	Notes
Loss	2–1	Mike Perry	TKO (punches)	BKFC Knucklemania IV	27 April 2024	1	1:00	Los Angeles, California, United States	
Win	2–0	Ulysses Diaz	TKO (doctor stoppage)	BKFC 18	26 June 2021	3	2:00	Miami, Florida, United States	Won the inaugural BKFC Middleweight Championship.
Win	1–0	Julian Lane	Decision (split)	BKFC 12	11 September 2020	5	2:00	Daytona Beach, Florida, United States	

== See also ==
- List of current UFC fighters
- List of male mixed martial artists
