= Chris Lytle =

American mixed martial artist and boxer

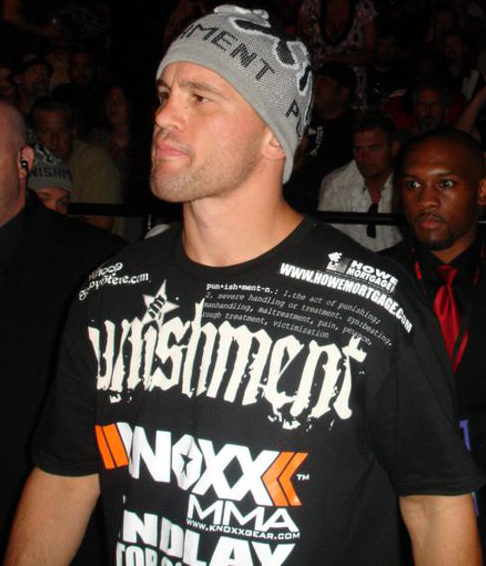
- Born: August 18, 1974 (age 52); Indianapolis, Indiana, U.S.
- Other names: Lights Out
- Height: 5 ft 11 in (1.80 m)
- Weight: 170 lb (77 kg; 12 st)
- Division: Heavyweight; Light Heavyweight; Middleweight; Welterweight
- Reach: 68 in (173 cm)
- Style: Wrestling, Boxing, Tang Soo Do
- Stance: Orthodox
- Team: Integrated Fighting Academy
- Trainer: Pat McPherson (MMA); Keith Palmer (Boxing)
- Years active: 1999–2011 (MMA); 2002–2005 (Boxing)

Professional boxing record
- Total: 15
- Wins: 13
- By knockout: 7
- Losses: 1
- Draws: 1

Mixed martial arts record
- Total: 54
- Wins: 31
- By knockout: 6
- By submission: 19
- By decision: 6
- Losses: 18
- By knockout: 2
- By decision: 16
- Draws: 5

Other information
- Occupation: Firefighter
- Boxing record from BoxRec
- Mixed martial arts record from Sherdog
- Last updated on: September 15, 2009

Chris Scott Lytle (born August 18, 1974) is an American retired mixed martial artist and boxer. A professional from 1999 until 2011 and twenty-fight veteran of the UFC, Lytle also fought in Pancrase, Cage Rage, and the WEC. He held the inaugural Cage Rage World Welterweight Championship and was a finalist on The Ultimate Fighter 4. During his tenure in the UFC, he was awarded "Fight of the Night" honors six times.

== Background ==
Lytle was born in Indianapolis, Indiana, and graduated from Southport High School in 1993. At Southport, he was a member of the wrestling team, finishing 4th place at the Indiana wrestling state tournament his junior year and 2nd place his senior year. He would oftentimes participate in workouts at the Southport High School with the wrestling team, with Coach Petty and Coach Dildine, after his days of competing. He has also helped coach at New Palestine High School. Lytle attended Indiana University, where he achieved a degree in sports management, Chris has a black belt in the Korean martial art Tang Soo Do.

== Mixed martial arts career ==
=== Early career ===
Lytle started training for fighting in 1998, saying that it was "something to keep me active". He trains part-time outside of his regular job as a firefighter, attending single-discipline gyms rather than MMA camps. He has held championships in the Hook N' Shoot and Absolute Fighting Championship promotions and won the Cage Rage World Welterweight Championship. He became the 175 lb Indiana state boxing champion, saying, "By the end of the year (2004), I think I'll have a few more smaller boxing titles."

=== Ultimate Fighting Championship ===
In 2006 Lytle was a contestant on The Ultimate Fighter 4 on Spike, where he defeated Pete Spratt and Din Thomas in exhibition bouts to proceed to the welterweight finale. On November 11, Matt Serra defeated Lytle by split decision in The Ultimate Fighter 4 Finale. Lytle was the more active fighter standing up, with Serra tying up and using foot stomps until he got takedowns, at which time he became the more active fighter, with Lytle holding guard and seemingly waiting for the referee to stand the fight up. Two judges scored the bout 30–27 for Serra and one judge scored the fight 30–27 for Lytle, but despite the scores the match was very close.

He lost to former UFC Welterweight Champion Matt Hughes on March 3 at UFC 68 in Columbus, Ohio via unanimous decision.

Lytle fought Jason Gilliam at UFC 73 on July 7, 2007. Lytle controlled the pace of the fight in the first round and eventually brought Gilliam to the ground. Lytle worked from top position, and eventually sunk in an inverted triangle choke from top position. To seal the fight he locked in an inverted armbar on Gilliam's free arm, forcing him to tap. This fight earned him a Submission of the Night award.

At a United Fight League show taking place in Indianapolis, Indiana on August 11, 2007, Lytle defeated Matt Brown by a guillotine choke in the second round.

Chris later lost to Thiago Alves at UFC 78 via a controversial doctor stoppage due to a cut at the end of the second round. Many fans booed as the cut was under the eye and fairly small. Typically doctors stop fights when blood his seeping into a fighters eye and impede vision. This fight earned him his first Fight of the Night award.

Lytle went on to defeat Kyle Bradley at UFC 81 by KO at 33 seconds of the first round. In an interview after the fight, Lytle stated that he had a new outlook on fighting; he would no longer pursue an "overly-technical" approach to each fight, but would go into his next fight and "not be afraid to lose." This fight earned him a $60,000 Knockout of the Night award.

On July 5, 2008, at UFC 86 Lytle lost to Josh Koscheck in a UFC Welterweight title eliminator fight. Koscheck used an effective ground and pound style to open up massive cuts on Lytle's face and ultimately won by decision.

Lytle's next fight was against British fighter Paul Taylor at UFC 89 on October 18, 2008, in Birmingham, England. Lytle won a unanimous decision (29–28, 30–27, and 29–28). The decision resulted in loud boos and Taylor was surprised at Lytle being awarded the judges' decision. This fight earned him a $40,000 Fight of the Night award.

Lytle's next fight was on January 17, 2009, against Marcus Davis at UFC 93. Both fighters are former boxers and had discussed a potential fight in their futures since early 2008. Lytle called out Davis after his win at UFC 89. He suggested that the fight take place in Ireland, where Davis had garnered a substantial following due to his emphasis on his Irish roots. Leading up to the event, both fighters promised to stand and trade blows for the entire fight, rather than engage in grappling. Lytle managed to stun Davis several times, but Davis used superior footwork, counterpunching, and kicks to win a split decision The bout shared Fight of the Night honors with the Coleman/Rua co-main event, earning Lytle a $40,000 bonus.

Lytle again won Fight of the Night at The Ultimate Fighter 9 Finale, defeating Kevin Burns, Lytle received a $25,000 bonus along with Diego Sanchez, Clay Guida, Joe Stevenson and Nate Diaz whose respective fights also won Fight of the Night. He was scheduled to fight Carlos Condit on September 16, 2009, at UFC Fight Night 19, but had to pull out due to a knee injury.

Lytle was expected to face Dong Hyun Kim on February 21, 2010, at UFC 110. This fight was later cancelled after Kim suffered a knee injury. Lytle instead faced Brian Foster at UFC 110 and was victorious via first round kneebar submission. This fight earned him another Submission of the Night award.

Lytle defeated Matt Brown on July 3, 2010, at UFC 116 via straight armbar/triangle choke in a rematch from 2007. The submission was very technical and was a strong contender for yet another Submission of the Night bonus, but said award was won by Brock Lesnar for the surprising arm triangle choke used on Shane Carwin, a choice that created minor controversy among fans. Although not another official fight bonus, Lytle was later awarded an undisclosed bonus for managing another exciting finish.

Lytle faced former UFC Welterweight Champion Matt Serra on September 25, 2010, at UFC 119 in a rematch of their 2006 bout at The Ultimate Fighter 4 Finale which he won via unanimous decision, out striking Serra throughout all three rounds.

Lytle was expected to face Carlos Condit on February 27, 2011, at UFC 127. However, Condit was forced from the bout after suffering a knee injury while training and replaced by UFC newcomer Brian Ebersole. Ebersole defeated Lytle via unanimous decision (30–27, 29–28, and 29–28), winning a $75,000 Fight of the Night award.

Lytle faced former UFC welterweight title contender Dan Hardy on August 14, 2011, at UFC on Versus 5. Chris Lytle stated at the weigh-ins he would retire after the bout regardless of the outcome. Regarding his retirement, Chris has been quoted as saying "“I feel like I’m not being the type of dad I want to. I got four kids and lots of time I feel just an immense sense of guilt for not being there in times when I should.” Lytle defeated Hardy via guillotine choke submission in the third round after being successful early on by utilizing his superior boxing, thus closing out his MMA career with a victory and 10–10 record in the UFC. Lytle walked away with Fight of the Night and Submission of the Night honors, and earned a 2012 Softail Blackline motorcycle from Harley-Davidson for the performance.

== Personal life ==
Chris Lytle is a retired firefighter at the Indianapolis Fire Department in addition to his fighting career. He also ran for the Indiana State Senate in District 28 in 2012 but lost.

On July 11, 2014, it was announced that Lytle was the latest to join the panel of MMA analysts for Fox Sports 1.

Currently Lytle has hosted the Lights Out Chris Lytle Show for City 360 TV in Indianapolis, Indiana.

On July 10, 2020, Lytle, along with Mike Davis and Miguel Iturrate, launched the Lytes Out Podcast.

Chris has four kids: Keegan, Kaylin, Corie, and Jake. [Corie Lytle]

Lytle is a lead commentator for the Bare Knuckle Fighting Championship.

== Championships and achievements ==
=== Mixed martial arts ===
- Ultimate Fighting Championship
  - First Fighter to win Fight, Submission and Knockout of the Night bonuses
  - Fight of the Night (Six times) vs. Thiago Alves, Paul Taylor, Marcus Davis, Kevin Burns, Brian Ebersole and Dan Hardy
  - Knockout of the Night (One time) vs. Kyle Bradley
  - Submission of the Night (Three times) vs. Jason Gilliam, Brian Foster and Dan Hardy
    - Most Post-Fight bonuses in UFC Welterweight division history (10)
  - UFC Encyclopedia Awards
    - Submission of the Night (One time) vs. Ronald Jhun
  - The Ultimate Fighter 4 Finalist
  - Tied (Demian Maia & Vicente Luque) for second most submissions in UFC Welterweight division history (6)
  - Most submission attempts in UFC Welterweight division history (31)
  - UFC.com Awards
    - 2007: Ranked #2 Submission of the Year vs. Jason Gilliam
    - 2010: Ranked #4 Submission of the Year vs. Brian Foster & Matt Brown
    - 2011: Ranked #10 Submission of the Year vs. Dan Hardy
- Cage Rage
  - Cage Rage World Welterweight Championship (One time)
- Sherdog
  - 2010 All-Violence First Team

=== Boxing ===
- Indiana Boxing Association
  - Indiana Boxing Association Light Heavyweight Title (One time)
  - Two successful title defenses

== Mixed martial arts record ==
Professional record breakdown
| 54 matches | 31 wins | 18 losses |
| By knockout | 6 | 2 |
| By submission | 19 | 0 |
| By decision | 6 | 16 |
| Draws | 5 | |

| Res. | Record | Opponent | Method | Event | Date | Round | Time | Location | Notes |
|---|---|---|---|---|---|---|---|---|---|
| Win | 31–18–5 | Dan Hardy | Submission (guillotine choke) | UFC Live: Hardy vs. Lytle | August 14, 2011 | 3 | 4:16 | Milwaukee, Wisconsin, United States | Submission of the Night. Fight of the Night. |
| Loss | 30–18–5 | Brian Ebersole | Decision (unanimous) | UFC 127 | February 27, 2011 | 3 | 5:00 | Sydney, Australia | Fight of the Night. |
| Win | 30–17–5 | Matt Serra | Decision (unanimous) | UFC 119 | September 25, 2010 | 3 | 5:00 | Indianapolis, Indiana, United States | |
| Win | 29–17–5 | Matt Brown | Submission (straight armbar) | UFC 116 | July 3, 2010 | 2 | 2:02 | Las Vegas, Nevada, United States | |
| Win | 28–17–5 | Brian Foster | Submission (kneebar) | UFC 110 | February 21, 2010 | 1 | 1:41 | Sydney, Australia | Submission of the Night. |
| Win | 27–17–5 | Kevin Burns | Decision (unanimous) | The Ultimate Fighter 9 Finale | June 20, 2009 | 3 | 5:00 | Las Vegas, Nevada, United States | Fight of the Night. |
| Loss | 26–17–5 | Marcus Davis | Decision (split) | UFC 93 | January 17, 2009 | 3 | 5:00 | Dublin, Ireland | Fight of the Night. |
| Win | 26–16–5 | Paul Taylor | Decision (unanimous) | UFC 89 | October 18, 2008 | 3 | 5:00 | Birmingham, England | Fight of the Night. |
| Loss | 25–16–5 | Josh Koscheck | Decision (unanimous) | UFC 86 | July 5, 2008 | 3 | 5:00 | Las Vegas, Nevada, United States | |
| Win | 25–15–5 | Kyle Bradley | TKO (punches) | UFC 81 | February 2, 2008 | 1 | 0:33 | Las Vegas, Nevada, United States | Knockout of the Night. |
| Loss | 24–15–5 | Thiago Alves | TKO (doctor stoppage) | UFC 78 | November 17, 2007 | 2 | 5:00 | Newark, New Jersey, United States | Fight of the Night. |
| Win | 24–14–5 | Matt Brown | Submission (guillotine choke) | UFL: Fight Night at Conseco Fieldhouse | August 11, 2007 | 2 | 2:49 | Indianapolis, Indiana, United States | |
| Win | 23–14–5 | Jason Gilliam | Submission (inverted triangle choke and Americana) | UFC 73 | July 7, 2007 | 1 | 2:15 | Sacramento, California, United States | Submission of the Night. |
| Loss | 22–14–5 | Matt Hughes | Decision (unanimous) | UFC 68 | March 3, 2007 | 3 | 5:00 | Columbus, Ohio, United States | |
| Loss | 22–13–5 | Matt Serra | Decision (split) | The Ultimate Fighter: The Comeback Finale | November 11, 2006 | 3 | 5:00 | Las Vegas, Nevada, United States | The Ultimate Fighter Season 4 Welterweight Tournament Final. |
| Win | 22–12–5 | Ross Mason | Submission (rear-naked choke) | Cage Rage 15 | February 4, 2006 | 2 | 4:57 | London, England | Won the Cage Rage World Welterweight Championship. |
| Win | 21–12–5 | Savant Young | TKO (submission to strikes) | WEC 18: Unfinished Business | January 13, 2006 | 1 | 3:50 | Lemoore, California, United States | |
| Loss | 20–12–5 | Joe Riggs | TKO (doctor stoppage) | UFC 55: Fury | October 7, 2005 | 2 | 2:00 | Uncasville, Connecticut, United States | |
| Win | 20–11–5 | Brian Dunn | TKO (punches) | Legends of Fighting | August 13, 2005 | 1 | 2:03 | Franklin, Indiana, United States | |
| Win | 19–11–5 | Pat Healy | Decision (split) | WEC 15: Judgment Day | May 19, 2005 | 3 | 5:00 | Lemoore, California, United States | |
| Loss | 18–11–5 | Karo Parisyan | Decision (unanimous) | UFC 51: Super Saturday | February 5, 2005 | 3 | 5:00 | Las Vegas, Nevada, United States | |
| Win | 18–10–5 | J.T. Taylor | Submission (forearm choke) | WEC 12 | October 21, 2004 | 1 | 2:53 | Lemoore, California, United States | |
| Win | 17–10–5 | Ronald Jhun | Submission (guillotine choke) | UFC 49 | August 21, 2004 | 2 | 1:17 | Las Vegas, Nevada, United States | |
| Win | 16–10–5 | Tiki Ghosn | Submission (bulldog choke) | UFC 47 | April 2, 2004 | 2 | 1:55 | Las Vegas, Nevada, United States | |
| Win | 15–10–5 | Pete Spratt | Submission (rear-naked choke) | RSF: Shooto Challenge 2 | January 2, 2004 | 1 | 0:46 | Belleville, Illinois, United States | Middleweight bout. |
| Loss | 14–10–5 | Robbie Lawler | Decision (unanimous) | UFC 45 | November 21, 2003 | 3 | 5:00 | Uncasville, Connecticut, United States | |
| Win | 14–9–5 | Derrick Noble | Submission (rear-naked choke) | RSF: Shooto Challenge | October 3, 2003 | 2 | 2:04 | Belleville, Illinois, United States | |
| Win | 13–9–5 | Chatt Lavender | Technical submission (triangle choke) | Absolute Fighting Championships 5 | September 5, 2003 | 1 | 0:55 | Fort Lauderdale, Florida, United States | |
| Win | 12–9–5 | LaVerne Clark | Decision (unanimous) | Battleground 1: War Cry | July 19, 2003 | 3 | 5:00 | Chicago, Illinois, United States | |
| Loss | 11–9–5 | Koji Oishi | Decision (split) | Pancrase: Hybrid 4 | April 12, 2003 | 3 | 5:00 | Tokyo, Japan | |
| Win | 11–8–5 | Aaron Riley | KO (punch) | HOOKnSHOOT: Boot Camp 1.1 | March 8, 2003 | 1 | 3:31 | Evansville, Indiana, United States | |
| Loss | 10–8–5 | Izuru Takeuchi | Decision (majority) | Pancrase: Spirit 9 | December 21, 2002 | 3 | 5:00 | Tokyo, Japan | Middleweight bout. |
| Win | 10–7–5 | Yuji Hoshino | Submission (triangle choke) | Pancrase: Spirit 7 | October 29, 2002 | 1 | 2:09 | Tokyo, Japan | Middleweight bout. |
| Loss | 9–7–5 | Nick Diaz | Decision (split) | IFC Warriors Challenge 17 | July 12, 2002 | 3 | 5:00 | Porterville, California, United States | |
| Win | 9–6–5 | Kazuo Misaki | Decision (unanimous) | Pancrase: Proof 7 | December 1, 2001 | 3 | 5:00 | Yokohama, Japan | Middleweight bout. |
| Win | 8–6–5 | Jake Ambrose | Submission (rear-naked choke) | Cage Rage 2 | April 14, 2001 | 1 | 1:49 | Kokomo, Indiana, United States | |
| Draw | 7–6–5 | Dave Strasser | Draw | Reality Submission Fighting 3 | March 30, 2001 | 1 | 18:00 | Illinois, United States | |
| Draw | 7–6–4 | Nick Hide | Draw | Circle City Challenge | February 3, 2001 | 3 | 5:00 | Indianapolis, Indiana, United States | |
| Win | 7–6–3 | Beaver Beaver | Submission (rear-naked choke) | Bad Boy Competition | November 24, 2000 | 1 | 2:18 | United States | |
| Win | 6–6–3 | Mike Haltom | TKO (submission to punches) | Bad Boy Competition | November 24, 2000 | 1 | 3:41 | United States | |
| Loss | 5–6–3 | Ben Earwood | Decision (unanimous) | UFC 28 | November 17, 2000 | 2 | 5:00 | Atlantic City, New Jersey, United States | Welterweight debut. |
| Loss | 5–5–3 | Shonie Carter | Decision (unanimous) | Pancrase: 2000 Anniversary Show | September 24, 2000 | 3 | 3:00 | Yokohama, Japan | |
| Win | 5–4–3 | Taro Obata | Submission (arm-triangle choke) | Pancrase: Trans 5 | July 23, 2000 | 1 | 2:56 | Tokyo, Japan | Middleweight debut. |
| Loss | 4–4–3 | Daisuke Ishii | Decision (unanimous) | Pancrase: Trans 4 | June 26, 2000 | 1 | 10:00 | Tokyo, Japan | |
| Win | 4–3–3 | CJ Fernandes | Submission (triangle choke) | HOOKnSHOOT: Double Fury 1 | March 17, 2000 | 1 | 3:54 | United States | |
| Loss | 3–3–3 | Keiichiro Yamamiya | Decision (unanimous) | Pancrase: Trans 1 | January 23, 2000 | 1 | 10:00 | Tokyo, Japan | Light Heavyweight debut. |
| Draw | 3–2–3 | Ikuhisa Minowa | Draw | Pancrase: Breakthrough 11 | December 18, 1999 | 1 | 15:00 | Yokohama, Japan | |
| Loss | 3–2–2 | Dave Menne | Decision (unanimous) | Extreme Challenge 29 | November 13, 1999 | 2 | 5:00 | Hayward, Wisconsin, United States | |
| Win | 3–1–2 | Luke Pedigo | Submission (guillotine choke) | HOOKnSHOOT: Millennium | November 6, 1999 | 1 | 1:57 | United States | |
| Draw | 2–1–2 | Takafumi Ito | Draw | Pancrase: 1999 Neo-Blood Tournament Opening Round | August 1, 1999 | 2 | 3:00 | Tokyo, Japan | Pancrase 1999 Neo-Blood Tournament Opening Round. |
| Loss | 2–1–1 | Jason DeLucia | Decision (majority) | Pancrase: Breakthrough 7 | July 6, 1999 | 1 | 10:00 | Tokyo, Japan | |
| Win | 2–0–1 | Daisuke Watanabe | Submission (armbar) | Pancrase: Breakthrough 6 | June 11, 1999 | 1 | 5:30 | Tokyo, Japan | |
| Draw | 1–0–1 | Osami Shibuya | Draw | Pancrase: Breakthrough 4 | April 18, 1999 | 1 | 15:00 | Yokohama, Japan | |
| Win | 1–0 | Bo Hershberger | TKO (submission to punches) | Neutral Grounds 10 | February 13, 1999 | 1 | 11:33 | Muncie, Indiana, United States | |

== Professional boxing record ==
13 Wins (7 knockouts, 6 decisions), 1 Loss (1 decision), 1 Draw
| Res. | Record | Opponent | Type | Rd., Time | Date | Location | Notes |
| Win | 13–1–1 | (United States) Omar Pittman | TKO | 7 (8), 0:42 | June 18, 2005 | Rising Sun, IN | |
| Win | 12–1–1 | (United States) Verdell Smith | UD | 8 | November 27, 2004 | Rising Sun, IN | |
| Win | 11–1–1 | (United States) Thomas Kirk | UD | 6 | October 19, 2004 | Indianapolis, IN | |
| Win | 10–1–1 | (United States) Jonathan Corn | UD | 8 | May 1, 2004 | Indianapolis, IN | |
| Win | 9–1–1 | (United States) Reggie Strickland | UD | 6 | February 3, 2004 | Indianapolis, IN | |
| Loss | 8–1–1 | (United States) Shay Mobley | UD | 8 | October 17, 2003 | Merrillville, IN | |
| Win | 8–0–1 | (United States) Darin Johnson | KO | 3 (8), 1:37 | October 7, 2003 | Indianapolis, IN | |
| Win | 7–0–1 | (United States) Mike Paul | TKO | 1 (4), 1:08 | August 5, 2003 | Indianapolis, IN | |
| Win | 6–0–1 | (United States) John Moore | UD | 8 | June 25, 2003 | Evansville, IN | Retained Indiana Boxing Association Light Heavyweight Title. |
| Win | 5–0–1 | (United States) Guy Solis | TKO | 1 (8), 2:59 | June 3, 2003 | Indianapolis, IN | Retained Indiana Boxing Association Light Heavyweight Title. |
| Win | 4–0–1 | (United States) John Moore | TKO | 8 (8), 1:43 | April 1, 2003 | Indianapolis, IN | Won Indiana Boxing Association Light Heavyweight Title. |
| Win | 3–0–1 | (United States) Ruben Ruiz | TKO | 1 (4), 2:59 | December 3, 2002 | Indianapolis, IN | |
| Win | 2–0–1 | (United States) Donnie Penelton | UD | 4 | October 1, 2002 | Indianapolis, IN | |
| Win | 1–0–1 | (United States) Toris Smith | TKO | 1 (4) | August 6, 2002 | Memphis, TN | |
| Draw | 0–0–1 | (United States) Matt Putnam | PTS | 4 | June 25, 2002 | Baraboo, WI | |

== Bare knuckle record ==
Professional record breakdown
| 3 matches | 3 wins | 0 losses |
| By knockout | 2 | 0 |
| By decision | 1 | 0 |

| Res. | Record | Opponent | Method | Event | Date | Round | Time | Location | Notes |
|---|---|---|---|---|---|---|---|---|---|
| Win | 3–0 | JC Llamas | Decision (unanimous) | BKFC 4 | February 2, 2019 | 5 | 2:00 | Cancun, Mexico | |
| Win | 2–0 | Drew Lipton | KO (punches) | BKFC 2 | August 25, 2018 | 1 | 1:18 | Biloxi, Mississippi, United States | |
| Win | 1–0 | Lewis Gallant | TKO (corner stoppage) | BKB 9 | January 13, 2018 | 3 | 1:56 | London, England | |

== See also ==
- List of mixed martial artists with professional boxing records
