= UFC Ultimate Fight Night 5 =

UFC mixed martial arts event in 2006

Ultimate Fight Night 5
- The poster for Ultimate Fight Night 5
- Promotion: Ultimate Fighting Championship
- Date: June 28, 2006
- Venue: Hard Rock Hotel and Casino
- City: Paradise, Nevada
- Attendance: 954
- Total gate: $134,368

Event chronology
The Ultimate Fighter: Team Ortiz vs. Team Shamrock Finale	Ultimate Fight Night 5	UFC 61: Bitter Rivals

Ultimate Fight Night 5 was a mixed martial arts event held by the Ultimate Fighting Championship on June 28, 2006. The event took place at Hard Rock Hotel and Casino, in Las Vegas, Nevada and was broadcast live on Spike TV in the United States and Canada.

The show drew a 1.4 overall rating and served as the lead-in for the premiere of Blade: The Series. This event featured the UFC debut of future middleweight champion Anderson Silva and also featured the first of 2 fights between future welterweight stars Jon Fitch and Thiago Alves . The disclosed fighter payroll for the event was $197,000.

== Results ==
Main Card
Weight class				Method	Round	Time	Notes
Welterweight	Jonathan Goulet	def.	Luke Cummo	Decision (majority) (30–27, 30–27, 29–29)	3	5:00
Middleweight	Anderson Silva	def.	Chris Leben	KO (knee)	1	0:49
Light Heavyweight	Rob MacDonald	def.	Kristian Rothaermel	Submission (armbar)	1	4:01
Light Heavyweight	Rashad Evans	def.	Stephan Bonnar	Decision (majority) (30–27, 29–28, 28–28)	3	5:00
Lightweight	Mark Hominick	def.	Jorge Gurgel	Decision (unanimous) (29–28, 29–28, 29–28)	3	5:00
Preliminary Card
Welterweight	Josh Koscheck	def.	Dave Menne	Decision (unanimous) (30–27, 29–28, 30–27)	3	5:00	(Note: This bout was not aired on the broadcast.)
Light Heavyweight	Jason Lambert	def.	Branden Lee Hinkle	TKO (punches)	1	5:00	(Note: This bout was not aired on the broadcast.)
Welterweight	Jon Fitch	def.	Thiago Alves	TKO (upkick and punches)	2	4:37	(Note: This bout was not aired on the broadcast.)
Middleweight	Jorge Santiago	def.	Justin Levens	KO (knee)	1	2:13	(Note: This bout was not aired on the broadcast.)

== Bonus awards ==
The following fighters received bonuses.

- Fight of the Night: Jonathan Goulet vs. Luke Cummo
- Knockout of the Night: Anderson Silva
- Submission of the Night: Rob MacDonald

== Reported payout ==
Anderson Silva: $36,000

Rashad Evans: $24,000

Stephan Bonnar: $16,000

Jon Fitch: $16,000

Josh Koscheck: $14,000

Jason Lambert: $14,000

Luke Cummo: $12,000

Rob MacDonald: $10,000

Mark Hominick: $8,000

Chris Leben: $7,000

Thiago Alves: $6,000

Jonathan Goulet: $6,000

Kristian Rothaermel: $5,000

Jorge Gurgel: $5,000

Justin Levens: $5,000

Dave Menne: $5,000

Branden Lee Hinkle: $4,000

Jorge Santiago: $4,000

Disclosed Fighter Payroll: $197,000

== See also ==
- Ultimate Fighting Championship
- List of UFC champions
- List of UFC events
- 2006 in UFC
