= UFC 86 =

UFC mixed martial arts event in 2008

UFC 86: Jackson vs. Griffin
- The poster for UFC 86: Jackson vs. Griffin
- Promotion: Ultimate Fighting Championship
- Date: July 5, 2008
- Venue: Mandalay Bay Events Center
- City: Las Vegas, Nevada
- Attendance: 10,990 (9,630 paid)
- Total gate: $3,350,730
- Buyrate: 540,000

Event chronology
The Ultimate Fighter: Team Rampage vs. Team Forrest Finale	UFC 86: Jackson vs. Griffin	UFC Fight Night: Silva vs. Irvin

UFC 86: Jackson vs. Griffin was a mixed martial arts (MMA) pay-per-view event held by the Ultimate Fighting Championship (UFC) on July 5, 2008, at the Mandalay Bay Events Center in Las Vegas, Nevada.

== Background ==
The main event was between Quinton "Rampage" Jackson and Forrest Griffin, coaches on The Ultimate Fighter: Team Rampage vs. Team Forrest, and was for Jackson's UFC Light Heavyweight Championship.

A welterweight bout between Steve Bruno and Chris Wilson was originally scheduled to take place at this event. However, the fight would be postponed and instead took place at UFC 87 on August 9, 2008.

== Results ==
Main card (PPV)
Weight class				Method	Round	Time	Notes
Light Heavyweight	Forrest Griffin	def.	Quinton Jackson (c)	Decision (unanimous) (48–46, 48–46, 49–46)	5	5:00	(Note: For the UFC Light Heavyweight Championship)
Middleweight	Patrick Côté	def.	Ricardo Almeida	Decision (split)	3	5:00
Lightweight	Joe Stevenson	def.	Gleison Tibau	Submission (guillotine choke)	2	2:57
Welterweight	Josh Koscheck	def.	Chris Lytle	Decision (unanimous)	3	5:00
Lightweight	Tyson Griffin	def.	Marcus Aurélio	Decision (unanimous)	3	5:00
Preliminary card
Heavyweight	Gabriel Gonzaga	def.	Justin McCully	Submission (Americana)	1	1:57
Lightweight	Melvin Guillard	def.	Dennis Siver	TKO (punches)	1	0:36
Lightweight	Cole Miller	def.	Jorge Gurgel	Submission (triangle choke)	3	4:48
Lightweight	Justin Buchholz	def.	Corey Hill	Submission (rear-naked choke)	2	3:57

== Bonus awards ==
The following fighters received $60,000 bonuses.

- Fight of the Night: Quinton Jackson vs. Forrest Griffin
- Knockout of the Night: Melvin Guillard
- Submission of the Night: Cole Miller

== See also ==
- Ultimate Fighting Championship
- List of UFC champions
- List of UFC events
- 2008 in UFC
