= Ryan Roberts (fighter) =

American mixed martial arts fighter

- Born: July 16, 1978 (age 48); Omaha, Nebraska, United States
- Other names: Are You Ready?
- Nationality: American
- Height: 5 ft 6 in (1.68 m)
- Weight: 139 lb (63 kg; 9.9 st)
- Division: Lightweight; Featherweight; Bantamweight
- Reach: 65.0
- Fighting out of: Omaha, Nebraska, United States
- Team: Disorderly Conduct
- Years active: 2006–present

Mixed martial arts record
- Total: 36
- Wins: 22
- By knockout: 9
- By submission: 3
- By decision: 10
- Losses: 12
- By knockout: 3
- By submission: 6
- By decision: 3
- Draws: 1
- No contests: 1

Bare-knuckle boxing record
- Total: 1
- Wins: 1
- By knockout: 1

Other information
- Mixed martial arts record from Sherdog

Ryan Roberts (born July 16, 1978) is an American former professional mixed martial artist, who competed in the Featherweight division, but has also competed at Lightweight and Bantamweight. He is the former VFC featherweight champion, and is also known for his short stints in Bellator and UFC. He is a bare-knuckle boxer, currently competing in the lightweight division in the Bare Knuckle Fighting Championship (BKFC).

== Mixed martial arts career ==
Roberts began his mixed martial arts career in 2006 for the AFC promotion, and made local competitor Nick Wright tap out from strikes early in the first round for his first victory. Four fights into his career, Roberts faced future WEC and UFC fighter Donald Cerrone, and was submitted with an armbar in the first round.

He would continue fighting local competitors in various smaller promotions in Iowa, Colorado, and Nebraska, and compiled a professional record of 10–2 before being signed by the Ultimate Fighting Championship in early 2008.

=== Ultimate Fighting Championship ===
In his one and only appearance for the UFC, Roberts faced submission specialist and Pride FC standout Marcus Aurelio at UFC Fight Night: Florian vs. Lauzon on April 2, 2008. Roberts was submitted with an armbar in just thirteen seconds, and was subsequently released from the promotion shortly after.

=== Post-UFC career ===
Following his UFC release, Roberts would go on a career worst six-fight losing streak against opponents of varying fighting status. On April 2, 2010, Roberts faced Chris Mickle at Midtown Promotions, and won the fight when Roberts knocked out Mickle with a slam in the first round. He won two more fights and was then signed by Bellator.

=== Bellator Fighting Championship ===
Roberts faced Eric Marriott in a rematch at Bellator 32 on October 14, 2010. He lost the fight by unanimous decision.

He returned to Bellator after an undefeated run on the regional circuit and faced Zach Makovsky at Bellator 54 on October 15, 2011. Roberts lost the fight by north–south choke and was released from Bellator.

=== Victory Fighting Championship ===
Since his release from Bellator, Roberts has made an unexpected career resurgence, successfully capturing the VFC featherweight championship against Josh Arocho on December 15, 2012.

For his first title defense, Roberts faced WEC veteran L.C. Davis at VFC 41 on December 14, 2013. Roberts won the back-and-forth fight by split decision. Roberts then faced Chase Beebe at VFC 42 on March 15, 2014, winning the fight by a dominant unanimous decision.

Roberts faced Jeremy Spoon at VFC: Fight Night Harrahs 1 on September 12, 2014. He won the fight by a razor-thin split decision, marking his third straight successful title defense. Roberts faced UFC veteran Ramiro Hernandez at VFC 46 on July 25, 2015, winning the fight by first-round knockout.

=== Resurrection Fighting Alliance ===
Roberts signed with Resurrection Fighting Alliance in mid-2015, and is faced prospect Adam Townsend in his debut at RFA 30 on September 18, 2015. He lost the bout by unanimous decision.

=== Return to Victory Fighting Championship and retirement ===
Roberts faced Robert Emerson at VFC 54 on December 9, 2016, and lost his VFC featherweight championship in the first round via technical knockout as a result of a knee injury. Roberts retired from MMA after the bout.

== Bare-knuckle boxing ==
=== Bare Knuckle Fighting Championship ===
Roberts made his debut against Jorge Gonzalez at BKFC 21 on September 10, 2021, and won by knockout in the second round.

Roberts faced Bobby Taylor at BKFC Fight Night 14 on May 17, 2024. He lost the fight by unanimous decision.

== Championships and accomplishments ==
- Victory Fighting Championship
  - VFC Featherweight Championship (One time)
  - Four successful title defenses (vs. L.C. Davis, Chase Beebe, Jeremy Spoon, Ramiro Hernandez.)
- Fury Fights
  - FF Lightweight Championship (One time)
- The Cage Incorporated
  - TCI Featherweight Championship (One time)

== Mixed martial arts record ==
Professional record breakdown
35 matches	21 wins	12 losses
By knockout	9	3
By submission	2	6
By decision	10	3
Draws	1	
No contests	1	

Res.	Record	Opponent	Method	Event	Date	Round	Time	Location	Notes
Loss	21–12–1 (1)	Robert Emerson	TKO (knee injury)	VFC 54: Pitolo vs. Kayne 2	December 9, 2016	1	1:34	Omaha, Nebraska, United States	Lost the VFC Featherweight Championship.
Loss	21–11–1 (1)	Adam Townsend	Decision (unanimous)	RFA 30: Smith vs. Jardine	September 18, 2015	3	5:00	Lincoln, Nebraska, United States	
Win	21–10–1 (1)	Ramiro Hernandez	KO (punches)	VFC: Victory Fighting Championship 46	July 25, 2015	1	2:12	Omaha, Nebraska, United States	Defended the VFC Featherweight Championship.
Win	20–10–1 (1)	Jeremy Spoon	Technical Decision (split)	VFC: Fight Night Harrahs 1	September 12, 2014	3	5:00	Council Bluffs, Iowa, United States	Defended the VFC Featherweight Championship.
Win	19–10–1 (1)	Chase Beebe	Decision (unanimous)	VFC: Victory Fighting Championship 42	March 15, 2014	5	5:00	Omaha, Nebraska, United States	Defended the VFC Featherweight Championship.
Win	18–10–1 (1)	L.C. Davis	Decision (split)	VFC: Victory Fighting Championship 41	December 14, 2013	5	5:00	Ralston, Nebraska, United States	
Win	17–10–1 (1)	Josh Arocho	Decision (unanimous)	VFC: Victory Fighting Championship 38	December 15, 2012	5	5:00	Ralston, Nebraska, United States	Won the VFC Featherweight Championship.
Loss	16–10–1 (1)	Zach Makovsky	Submission (north-south choke)	Bellator LIV	October 15, 2011	1	4:48	Atlantic City, New Jersey, United States	
Draw	16–9–1 (1)	Rick Glenn	Draw	MCC 35: Brawl at the Hall	August 5, 2011	5	5:00	Des Moines, Iowa, United States	
Win	16–9 (1)	Nick Mamalis	Decision (unanimous)	The Cage Inc.: Battle at the Border 9	April 23, 2011	5	5:00	Hankinson, North Dakota, United States	Won the TCI Featherweight Championship.
Win	15–9 (1)	Dennis Davis	Decision (unanimous)	EB: Beatdown at 4 Bears 8	March 12, 2011	3	5:00	New Town, North Dakota, United States	
Win	14–9 (1)	Jeff Lentz	Decision (unanimous)	Extreme Challenge: Bad Blood	February 11, 2011	3	5:00	Council Bluffs, Iowa, United States	
Loss	13–9 (1)	Eric Marriott	Decision (unanimous)	Bellator XXXII	October 14, 2010	3	5:00	Kansas City, Missouri, United States	
Win	13–8 (1)	Eric Marriott	Decision (unanimous)	VFC 32: Dober vs. Seipel 2	July 30, 2010	3	5:00	Council Bluffs, Iowa, United States	
Win	12–8 (1)	Chaz Haag	TKO (punches)	CFX / XKL: Mayhem in Minneapolis	April 24, 2010	1	0:20	Minneapolis, Minnesota, United States	
Win	11–8 (1)	Chris Mickle	KO (slam)	Midtown Productions: Mayhem at Mancuso	April 2, 2010	1	3:50	Omaha, Nebraska, United States	
Loss	10–8 (1)	Duane Ludwig	TKO (submission to punches)	ROF 36: Demolition	December 4, 2009	1	2:05	Denver, Colorado, United States	
Loss	10–7 (1)	Eric Marriott	Decision (unanimous)	TFC 14: Titan Fighting Championship 14	October 2, 2009	3	5:00	Kansas City, Kansas, United States	
Loss	10–6 (1)	Jonathan Murphy	TKO (punches)	XFO: Xtreme Fighting Organization 28	February 27, 2009	1	2:24	Lakemoor, Illinois, United States	
Loss	10–5 (1)	Joe Wilk	Submission (guillotine choke)	VFC 26: Onslaught	February 20, 2009	1	3:06	Council Bluffs, Iowa, United States	
Loss	10–4 (1)	John Mahlow	Submission	AE: Atomic Enterprizes	September 6, 2008	2	2:10	Sarasota, Florida, United States	
Loss	10–3 (1)	Marcus Aurelio	Submission (armbar)	UFC Fight Night: Florian vs. Lauzon	April 2, 2008	1	0:16	Broomfield, Colorado, United States	
Win	10–2 (1)	Joe Doherty	Decision (unanimous)	VFC 22: Ascension	February 29, 2008	5	5:00		
Win	9–2 (1)	Zach Wolff	TKO (punches)	VFC 22: Ascension	February 29, 2008	2	2:23		
Loss	8–2 (1)	Alonzo Martinez	Submission	VFC 20: Aces	September 7, 2007	1	N/A	Council Bluffs, Iowa, United States	
Win	8–1 (1)	Rocky Johnson	Decision (split)	Battlequest 6: Shootout	July 21, 2007	3	5:00	Eagle, Colorado, United States	
NC	7–1 (1)	Zac George	No Contest	IFO: Eastman vs. Kimmons	July 7, 2007	1	2:09	Las Vegas, Nevada, United States	
Win	7–1	Eugene Crisler	TKO (punches)	XFO: Xtreme Fighting Organization 18	June 30, 2007	2	1:37	Wisconsin Dells, Wisconsin, United States	
Win	6–1	Alex Rutter	KO (punches)	VFC 19: Inferno	May 18, 2007	1	3:22	Council Bluffs, Iowa, United States	
Win	5–1	Jake Burriola	Submission (keylock)	GFC 1: Genesis	April 20, 2007	2	3:19	Des Moines, Iowa, United States	
Loss	4–1	Donald Cerrone	Submission (armbar)	ROF 28: Evolution	February 16, 2007	1	1:49	Broomfield, Colorado, United States	
Win	4–0	Josh Smidt	Submission (rear-naked choke)	RFN 2: Royalty Fight Night 2	February 10, 2007	2	1:37	Emmetsburg, Iowa, United States	
Win	3–0	Ryan Heckert	TKO (punches)	VFC 17: Predators	December 9, 2006	1	1:15	Council Bluffs, Iowa, United States	
Win	2–0	Tony Hawkins	TKO (punches)	Fury Fights: Battle in Brookings 1	December 2, 2006	1	2:18	South Dakota, United States, United States	Won the Fury Fights Lightweight Championship.
Win	1–0	Nick Wright	TKO (submission to punches)	AFC 9: Fresh Meat	August 25, 2006	1	N/A	Omaha, Nebraska, United States	

== Bare knuckle boxing record ==
Professional record breakdown
2 matches	1 win	1 loss
By knockout	1	0
By decision	0	1

Res.	Record	Opponent	Method	Event	Date	Round	Time	Location	Notes
Loss	1–1	Bobby Taylor	Decision (unanimous)	BKFC Fight Night Omaha: Trinidad-Snake vs. Pague	May 17, 2024	5	2:00	Omaha, Nebraska, United States	
Win	1–0	Jorge Gonzalez	KO (punch)	BKFC 21	September 10, 2021	2	0:29	Omaha, Nebraska, United States	

== See also ==
- List of male mixed martial artists
