= UFC 73 =

UFC mixed martial arts event in 2007

UFC 73: Stacked
- The poster for UFC 73: Stacked
- Promotion: Ultimate Fighting Championship
- Date: July 7, 2007
- Venue: ARCO Arena
- City: Sacramento, California
- Attendance: 13,183
- Total gate: $1,551,920
- Buyrate: 425,000
- Total purse: $761,000 (disclosed)

Event chronology
The Ultimate Fighter: Team Pulver vs. Team Penn Finale	UFC 73: Stacked	UFC 74: Respect

UFC 73: Stacked was a mixed martial arts (MMA) event held by the Ultimate Fighting Championship (UFC). It took place on July 7, 2007, at the ARCO Arena in Sacramento, California and featured a total of nine bouts: four on the preliminary card and five on the main card.

== Background ==
In the main event, Anderson Silva put his UFC Middleweight Championship belt on the line against Nate Marquardt.

The card's other championship match had Sean Sherk defending his UFC Lightweight Championship belt against Hermes Franca. Post–fight, the California State Athletic Commission announced that both fighters tested positive for performance enhancing drugs. Sherk was eventually stripped of the title.

Jason Gilliam was the third choice for Chris Lytle's opponent. Originally scheduled to compete was Jeff Joslin, who withdrew due to a training injury. His replacement, Drew Fickett, also withdrew later due to injury.

Jorge Gurgel was initially reported to be facing future WEC Lightweight Champion Jamie Varner at this event, but Varner was later moved to the WEC for a planned match at WEC 27. Gurgel would instead fight Diego Saraiva on this card.

== Results ==
Main card (PPV)
Weight class				Method	Round	Time	Notes
Middleweight	Anderson Silva (c)	def.	Nate Marquardt	TKO (punches)	1	4:50	(Note: For the UFC Middleweight Championship.)
Light Heavyweight	Tito Ortiz	vs.	Rashad Evans	Draw (unanimous) (28–28, 28–28, 28–28)	3	5:00	(Note: Ortiz was deducted one point in round 2 for grabbing the fence.)
Lightweight	Sean Sherk (c)	def.	Hermes França	Decision (unanimous) (50–45, 50–45, 49–46)	5	5:00	(Note: For the UFC Lightweight Championship; Both fighters failed their drug tests.)
Heavyweight	Antônio Rodrigo Nogueira	def.	Heath Herring	Decision (unanimous) (29–28, 29–28, 29–28)	3	5:00
Lightweight	Kenny Florian	def.	Alvin Robinson	TKO (submission to punches)	1	4:30	(Note: This fight was delayed until after the main event due to time constraints.)
Preliminary card
Light Heavyweight	Stephan Bonnar	def.	Mike Nickels	Submission (rear-naked choke)	1	2:14
Lightweight	Jorge Gurgel	def.	Diego Saraiva	Decision (unanimous) (30–27, 30–27, 30–27)	3	5:00
Welterweight	Chris Lytle	def.	Jason Gilliam	Submission (inverted triangle choke and americana)	1	2:15
Lightweight	Frankie Edgar	def.	Mark Bocek	TKO (punches)	1	4:55

== Bonus awards ==
The following fighters received $40,000 bonuses.

- Fight of the Night: Jorge Gurgel vs. Diego Saraiva
- Knockout of the Night: Anderson Silva
- Submission of the Night: Chris Lytle

== Purses ==
Purse amounts were provided by the California State Athletic Commission, and include amounts for show and win. The figures do not include any undisclosed bonuses:

- Anderson Silva – $90,000 ($45,000 + $45,000 win bonus) def. Nate Marquardt – $24,000
- Sean Sherk – $28,000 ($14,000 + $14,000 win bonus) def. Hermes Franca – $14,000
- Tito Ortiz – $210,000 draw with Rashad Evans – $16,000
- Antônio Rodrigo Nogueira – $200,000 ($100,000 + $100,000 win bonus) def. Heath Herring – $70,000
- Kenny Florian – $16,000 ($8,000 + $8,000 win bonus) def. Alvin Robinson – $3,000
- Stephan Bonnar – $32,000 ($16,000 + $16,000 win bonus) def. Mike Nickels – $5,000
- Chris Lytle – $20,000 ($10,000 + $10,000 win bonus) def. Jason Gilliam – $3,000
- Jorge Gurgel – $14,000 ($7,000 + $7,000 win bonus) def. Diego Saraiva – $3,000
- Frank Edgar – $10,000 ($5,000 + $5,000 win bonus) def. Mark Bocek – $3,000

Total disclosed payroll: $761,000

== See also ==
- Ultimate Fighting Championship
- List of UFC champions
- List of UFC events
- 2007 in UFC
