= Luke Caudillo =

American mixed martial arts fighter

- Born: November 30, 1980 (age 45); North Platte, Nebraska, United States
- Other names: Lil' Hulk
- Nationality: American
- Height: 5 ft 7 in (1.70 m)
- Weight: 155 lb (70 kg; 11.1 st)
- Division: Welterweight; Lightweight
- Fighting out of: Arvada, Colorado, United States
- Team: Genesis Training Center (2016–present); Grudge Training Center
- Rank: Black belt in Brazilian Jiu Jitsu
- Years active: 2003-2012

Mixed martial arts record
- Total: 34
- Wins: 17
- By knockout: 11
- By submission: 2
- By decision: 4
- Losses: 17
- By knockout: 3
- By submission: 10
- By decision: 4

Other information
- Mixed martial arts record from Sherdog

Luke Caudillo (born November 30, 1980) is an American former mixed martial artist. A professional from 2003 until 2012, he fought in the UFC.

== Mixed martial arts career ==
=== Ultimate Fighting Championship ===
Caudillo made his UFC debut at UFC Fight Night 10 on June 12, 2007, against fellow prospect Nate Mohr. He lost the fight by unanimous decision. Caudillo then faced former Pride fighter Marcus Aurelio at UFC 78 on November 17, 2007. Caudillo lost the fight via TKO (punches) in the first round, and was released from the promotion shortly after.

=== Post-UFC career ===
Caudillo last fought on June 29, 2012, when he faced Thierry Quenneville. He lost by unanimous decision.

== Mixed martial arts record ==
Professional record breakdown
34 matches	17 wins	17 losses
By knockout	11	3
By submission	2	10
By decision	4	4

Res.	Record	Opponent	Method	Event	Date	Round	Time	Location	Notes
Loss	17–17	Thierry Quenneville	Decision (unanimous)	Instinct MMA - Instinct Fighting 4	June 29, 2012	3	5:00	Montreal, Quebec, Canada	
Win	17–16	Steve Granieri	KO (knee)	Fight To Win: Outlaws	May 14, 2011	2	1:04	Denver, Colorado, United States	
Loss	16–16	Sean Wilson	TKO (punches)	ROF 37: Warlords	March 5, 2010	2	1:15	Omaha, Nebraska, United States	
Win	16–15	Jordan Eggli	Submission (punches)	Midwest Championship Fighting: Perdition	February 13, 2010	1	3:23	North Platte, Nebraska, United States	
Loss	15–15	Gideon Ray	Decision (unanimous)	Raw Power - MMA	December 10, 2009	3	5:00	Sanabis, Bahrain	
Loss	15–14	Josh Arocho	Submission (rear-naked choke)	ROF 34: Judgment Day	April 11, 2009	2	3:25	Broomfield, Colorado, United States	
Loss	15–13	Billy Evangelista	Decision (unanimous)	Strikeforce: Payback	October 3, 2008	3	5:00	Denver, Colorado, United States	
Loss	15–12	Torrance Taylor	Submission (rear-naked choke)	ROF 32: Respect	June 13, 2008	3	3:10	Broomfield, Colorado, United States	
Loss	15–11	Marcus Aurélio	TKO (punches)	UFC 78	November 17, 2007	1	4:29	Newark, New Jersey, United States	
Loss	15–10	Nate Mohr	Decision (unanimous)	UFC Fight Night 10	June 12, 2007	3	5:00	Hollywood, Florida, United States	
Win	15–9	Dennis Davis	Decision (split)	ROF 29: Aftershock	April 28, 2007	3	5:00	Broomfield, Colorado, United States	
Win	14–9	Justin Graves	TKO (punches)	MCF: Notorious	February 24, 2007	1	3:49	North Platte, Nebraska, United States	
Win	13–9	Samuel Guillet	KO (punches)	TKO 28: Inevitable	February 9, 2007	1	0:12	Montreal, Quebec, Canada	
Win	12–9	Jeff Luhman	TKO (punches)	MCF: Genesis	November 18, 2006	2	4:44	North Platte, Nebraska, United States	
Loss	11–9	Alonzo Martinez	Submission (guillotine choke)	VFC 16: Kings	September 9, 2006	2	N/A	Council Bluffs, Iowa, United States	
Win	11–8	Alonzo Martinez	TKO (punches)	VFC 13: Redemption	May 13, 2006	2	4:59	North Platte, Nebraska, United States	
Win	10–8	Nick Boulware	TKO (punches)	IFC: Rumble on the River	March 11, 2006	1	N/A	Kearney, Nebraska, United States	
Loss	9–8	Chris Avila	Submission (armbar)	RITR: Rumble in the Rockies	February 18, 2006	1	4:39	Colorado, United States	
Loss	9–7	Alvin Robinson	Submission (rear-naked choke)	ROF 20: Elite	December 10, 2005	1	1:33	Castle Rock, Colorado, United States	
Win	9–6	David Moench	Decision (unanimous)	UCE: Round 17 - Finals	October 22, 2005	3	5:00	Salt Lake City, Utah, United States	
Win	8–6	James Martinez	TKO (corner stoppage)	ROF 18: River Valley Rumble	July 30, 2005	1	3:00	North Platte, Nebraska, United States	
Win	7–6	Vern Baca	Submission (strikes)	Ring of Fire 16	April 9, 2005	2	3:06	Colorado, United States	
Loss	6–6	Bart Palaszewski	Submission (guillotine choke)	Combat: Do Fighting Challenge 2	February 5, 2005	N/A	N/A	Illinois, United States	
Win	6–5	Tom Kirk	TKO (punches)	Combat: Do Fighting Challenge 1	October 23, 2004	3	N/A	Cicero, Illinois, United States	
Win	5–5	Tim Means	TKO (injury)	Ring of Fire 13	September 24, 2004	1	1:40	Castle Rock, Colorado, United States	
Win	4–5	James Martinez	Decision (majority)	ROF 12: Nemesis	May 22, 2004	2	5:00	Castle Rock, Colorado, United States	
Loss	3–5	John Strawn	Submission (rear-naked choke)	Extreme Challenge 57	May 6, 2004	2	1:57	Council Bluffs, Iowa, United States	
Loss	3–4	Jake Hudson	Submission (keylock)	VFC 7: Showdown	March 6, 2004	1	1:37	Council Bluffs, Iowa, United States	
Loss	3–3	Alonzo Martinez	TKO (corner stoppage)	VFC 6: Overload	November 22, 2003	3	2:32	Council Bluffs, Iowa, United States	
Win	3–2	Brock Jensen	Decision (unanimous)	ROF 10: Intensity	October 18, 2003	3	3:00	Castle Rock, Colorado, United States	
Win	2–2	Kendrick Johnson	TKO (punches)	Victory Fighting 5	July 12, 2003	1	0:26	Council Bluffs, Iowa, United States	
Loss	1–2	Tom Sarah	Submission (triangle choke)	ROF 8: Reckoning	June 14, 2003	2	1:31	Castle Rock, Colorado, United States	
Win	1–1	Steve Horton	TKO (injury)	VFC 4: Wildcard	April 19, 2003	1	0:52	Council Bluffs, Iowa, United States	
Loss	0–1	Brock Larson	Submission (keylock)	IWW - Iowa Winter Waters	January 25, 2003	N/A	N/A	Spirit Lake, Iowa, United States	
