= Marcus Aurélio =

Brazilian mixed martial arts fighter

Marcus Aurelio "Maximus"
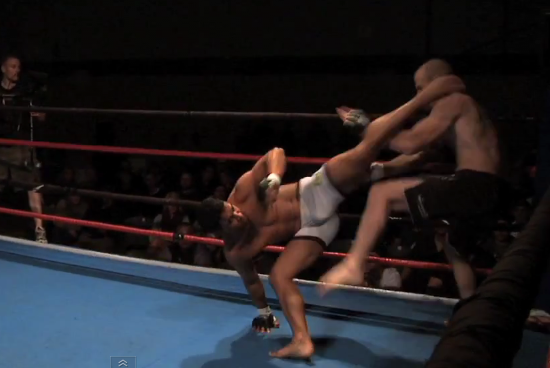
- Born: Marcus Aurélio Martins; 18 August 1973 (age 53); Fortaleza, Brazil
- Other names: Maximus
- Height: 5 ft 10 in (1.78 m)
- Weight: 155 lb (70 kg; 11.1 st)
- Division: Lightweight
- Reach: 76 1/2 in (194 cm)
- Fighting out of: Miami, Florida
- Team: Brazilian Jiu Jitsu
- Rank: 5th degree black belt in Brazilian Jiu-Jitsu; Graduate in Brazilian Jiu Jitsu and MMA

Mixed martial arts record
- Total: 32
- Wins: 22
- By knockout: 4
- By submission: 15
- By decision: 3
- Losses: 10
- By decision: 10

Other information
- Mixed martial arts record from Sherdog

Marcus Aurélio Martins (Portuguese pronunciation: [ˈmaʁkuz awˈɾɛliu]; born 18 August 1973) is a Brazilian former mixed martial artist. He formerly fought for the PRIDE Fighting Championships and for the Ultimate Fighting Championship. He currently does stunt and mo-cap work, after an MMA career with fights as a lightweight.

== Mixed martial arts career ==
=== Early career ===
Aurélio began his career in promotions such as ZST and HOOKnSHOOT, earning notable submission victories against Remigijus Morkevicius and Rich Clementi. Aurelio then came to PRIDE Bushido, where he defeated PRIDE Lightweight Champion Takanori Gomi with an arm triangle in a non title fight. A rematch for the title was scheduled six months later, which Gomi won by a controversial split decision.

=== Ultimate Fighting Championship ===
On 24 June 2007, Aurelio announced his signing with the UFC. He made his debut at UFC 74, losing to Clay Guida by split decision.

Aurelio won his next fight over Luke Caudillo via first round TKO at UFC 78.

He was defeated by Evan Dunham on 29 August 2009 at UFC 102. He replaced Matt Veach who sustained a back injury while training.

After his defeat at the hands of Dunham, Aurelio was released from the organization, along with fellow UFC veterans, Chris Wilson, and Justin McCully.

After racking up two consecutive wins in his post UFC career, Aurelio faced Japanese grappler Shinya Aoki at Dream 16. Aoki utilized superior ground control to take a unanimous decision.

== Championships and accomplishments ==
- ZST
  - ZST Grand Prix Winner (One time)
- HOOKnSHOOT
  - HnS Southeast Lightweight Championship (One time)
- United States Mixed Martial Arts
  - USMMA Lightweight Championship (One time; first)
- MMA Fighting
  - 2008 #8 Ranked UFC Submission of the Year vs. Ryan Roberts at UFC Fight Night 13

== Mixed martial arts record ==
Professional record breakdown
32 matches	22 wins	10 losses
By knockout	4	0
By submission	15	0
By decision	3	10

Res.	Record	Opponent	Method	Event	Date	Round	Time	Location	Notes
Win	22–10	Garrett Gross	Submission (armbar)	WF-Warrior Fight	29 November 2012	1	4:56	Fortaleza, Brazil	
Loss	21–10	Lyle Beerbohm	Decision (unanimous)	ShoFight 20	16 June 2012	3	5:00	Springfield, Missouri, United States	
Win	21–9	Matt McGrath	Submission (armbar)	MMA Live 1	19 May 2011	1	3:39	London, Ontario, Canada	
Loss	20–9	Shinya Aoki	Decision (unanimous)	Dream 16	25 September 2010	2	5:00	Nagoya, Japan	
Win	20–8	Niko Puhakka	Submission (rear naked choke)	Fight Festival 27	13 March 2010	2	2:40	Helsinki, Finland	
Win	19–8	Daniel Aspe	Submission (rear-naked choke)	NDC 1 – Peru vs. American Top Team	17 October 2009	2	2:37	Lima, Peru	
Loss	18–8	Evan Dunham	Decision (split)	UFC 102	29 August 2009	3	5:00	Portland, Oregon, United States	
Win	18–7	Joey Gorczynski	Submission (rear naked choke)	5150 Combat: Rumble at the Rally	27 June 2009	1	3:45	Oklahoma, United States	
Win	17–7	Chris Liguori	KO (punch)	WCA: Pure Combat	6 February 2009	2	0:23	New Jersey, United States	
Loss	16–7	Hermes França	Decision (unanimous)	UFC 90	25 October 2008	3	5:00	Rosemont, Illinois, United States	
Loss	16–6	Tyson Griffin	Decision (unanimous)	UFC 86	5 July 2008	3	5:00	Las Vegas, Nevada, United States	
Win	16–5	Ryan Roberts	Submission (armbar)	UFC Fight Night 13	2 April 2008	1	0:16	Broomfield, Colorado, United States	
Win	15–5	Luke Caudillo	TKO (strikes)	UFC 78	17 November 2007	1	4:29	Newark, New Jersey, United States	
Loss	14–5	Clay Guida	Decision (split)	UFC 74	25 August 2007	3	5:00	Las Vegas, Nevada, United States	UFC debut
Loss	14–4	Takanori Gomi	Decision (split)	Pride - Bushido 13	5 November 2006	2	5:00	Yokohama, Japan	For Pride Lightweight Championship
Loss	14–3	Mitsuhiro Ishida	Decision (unanimous)	Pride - Bushido 11	4 June 2006	2	5:00	Saitama, Saitama, Japan	
Win	14–2	Takanori Gomi	Technical Submission (arm triangle choke)	Pride - Bushido 10	2 April 2006	1	4:34	Tokyo, Japan	
Win	13–2	Jutaro Nakao	Decision (unanimous)	PRIDE Bushido 8	17 July 2005	2	5:00	Nagoya, Japan	
Win	12–2	Daisuke Nakamura	Decision (unanimous)	PRIDE Bushido 6	3 April 2005	2	5:00	Yokohama, Japan	
Loss	11–2	Dokonjonosuke Mishima	Decision (split)	PRIDE Bushido 4	19 July 2004	2	5:00	Nagoya, Japan	
Win	11–1	Naoyuki Kotani	TKO (cut)	ZST.5	5 May 2004	2	3:34	Tokyo, Japan	
Win	10–1	Remigijus Morkevicius	Submission (triangle choke)	ZST: Grand Prix Final Round	11 January 2004	1	2:48	Tokyo, Japan	Won ZST Grand Prix
Win	9–1	Masakazu Imanari	Decision (split)	ZST: Grand Prix Final Round	11 January 2004	2	5:00	Tokyo, Japan	
Win	8–1	Rich Clementi	Submission (injury)	ZST: Grand Prix Final Round	11 January 2004	1	0:40	Tokyo, Japan	
Win	7–1	Takumi Nakayama	Submission (armbar)	ZST: Grand Prix Opening Round	23 November 2003	1	3:05	Tokyo, Japan	
Win	6–1	James Dunn	TKO (corner stoppage)	Mass Destruction 12	16 August 2003	1	5:00	Massachusetts, United States	
Loss	5–1	Antonio McKee	Decision (split)	KOTC 27: Aftermath	10 August 2003	2	5:00	California, United States	
Win	5–0	Darrell Smith	Submission (triangle choke)	Absolute Fighting Championships 3	24 May 2003	1	2:35	Florida, United States	Defended HnS Southeast Lightweight Championship
Win	4–0	David Gardner	Submission (armbar)	USMMA 3: Ring of Fury	3 May 2003	3	4:13	Massachusetts, United States	Won vacant USMMA Lightweight Championship
Win	3–0	Justin Wisniewski	Submission (armbar)	Absolute Fighting Championships 2	28 March 2003	1	1:14	Florida, United States	Won HnS Southeast Lightweight Championship
Win	2–0	Scott Johnson	Submission (armbar)	XFA 5: Redemption	25 January 2003	1	3:31	Florida, United States	
Win	1–0	Walter McCall	Submission (triangle choke)	WEFC 1: Bring It On	29 June 2002	2	2:45	Georgia, United States	
