= Alvin Robinson =

American mixed martial arts (MMA) fighter

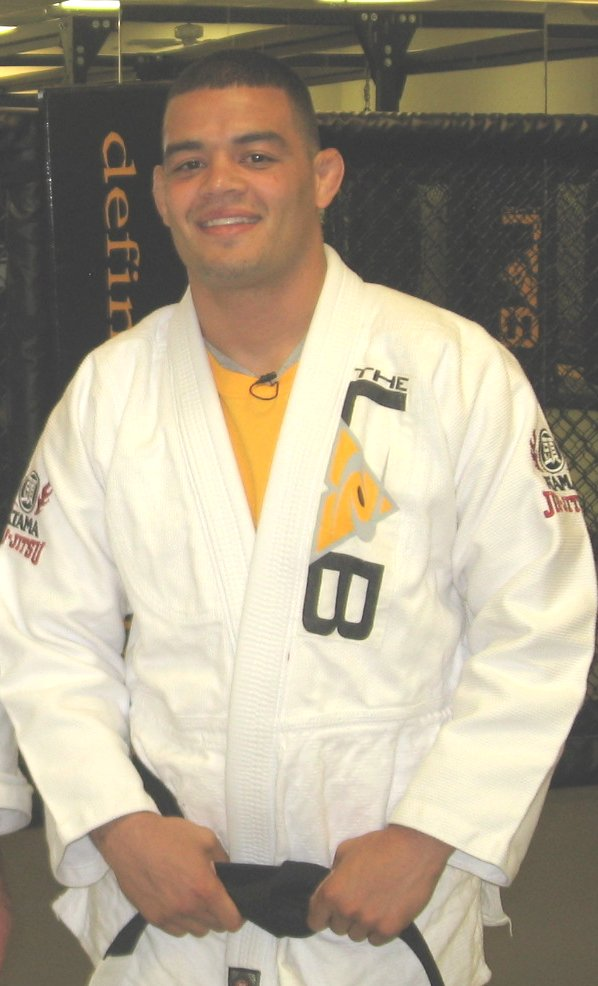
- Born: July 16, 1982 (age 44); West Covina, California, United States
- Other names: The Kid
- Height: 5 ft 9 in (1.75 m)
- Weight: 145 lb (66 kg; 10.4 st)
- Division: Featherweight; Lightweight (formerly)
- Stance: Southpaw
- Fighting out of: Denver, Colorado
- Team: Mile High Gracie, Grudge Fight Team
- Rank: black belt in BJJ under Royce Gracie

Mixed martial arts record
- Total: 24
- Wins: 15
- By submission: 14
- By decision: 1
- Losses: 9
- By knockout: 3
- By submission: 6

Other information
- Mixed martial arts record from Sherdog

Alvin Leavon Robinson (born July 16, 1982) is an American former professional mixed martial artist who fought as a lightweight for the Bellator Fighting Championships. He is a former Ring of Fire lightweight champion. As of January 2015, he held a professional record of 14 wins and eight losses.

== Mixed martial arts career ==
Robinson is a black belt in Brazilian Jiu-Jitsu under Royce Gracie. Robinson became the Ring of Fire lightweight champion by defeating Luke Caudillo by rear naked choke in the first round on December 10, 2005.

Robinson made his UFC debut at UFC 73 against The Ultimate Fighter's Kenny Florian on July 7, 2007. Robinson was defeated in the 1st round. Florian tripped Robinson to the mat before moving to side-control. Florian then transitioned into mount before pounding away until Robinson tapped due to strikes.

He defeated Jorge Gurgel via unanimous decision at UFC 77.

Robinson signed with Bellator Fighting Championships to face Georgi Karakhanyan on September 9, 2010, in New Orleans. However, Robinson was forced out of the bout due to an injury and was replaced by Anthony Leone.

In January 2015, at the age of 32, he announced that he would be retiring imminently. In the same month, he lost to Ricky Musgrave by TKO at RFA22. His last professional fight was in November 2015, a victory in the Prize Fighting Championship in Denver, Colorado.

== Mixed martial arts record ==
Professional record breakdown
24 matches	15 wins	9 losses
By knockout	0	3
By submission	14	6
By decision	1	0

Res.	Record	Opponent	Method	Event	Date	Round	Time	Location	Notes
Win	15–9	Josh Huber	Submission (arm-triangle choke)	FTW – Prize Fighting Championship 12	November 6, 2015	1	3:15	Denver, Colorado, United States	
Loss	14–9	Ricky Musgrave	TKO (punches)	RFA 22 – Smith vs Njokuani	January 9, 2015	1	3:55	Colorado Springs, Colorado, United States	
Win	14–8	Fabio Serrao	Submission (rear naked choke)	RFA 20 – Sanders vs. Mercado	November 4, 2014	1	3:14	Broomfield, Colorado, United States	
Loss	13–8	Gleristone Santos	TKO (punches)	Titan FC 28: Brilz vs. Davis	May 16, 2014	2	4:51	Newkirk, Oklahoma, United States	
Win	13–7	Joey Munoz	Submission	Kick Down MMA 110 – Enforcers	September 14, 2013	1	0:42	Denver, Colorado, United States	
Loss	12–7	Daniel Mason-Straus	Submission (rear naked choke)	Bellator 78	October 26, 2012	2	4:51	Dayton, Ohio, United States	
Win	12–6	Adam Lorenz	Technical Submission (rear naked choke)	AMMA 8: Unfinished Business	September 16, 2011	1	0:54	Edmonton, Alberta, Canada	Won Aggression MMA Featherweight Championship
Loss	11–6	Cameron Dollar	Submission (rear naked choke)	Fight to Win: Mortal Combat	February 25, 2011	1	4:59	Denver, Colorado, United States	
Win	11–5	Jesse Henley	Submission (rear naked choke)	Fight to Win / King of Champions: Worlds Collide	July 24, 2010	1	1:38	Denver, Colorado, United States	
Win	10–5	Brandon Girtz	Submission (rear naked choke)	Cage Fighting Xtreme	May 15, 2010	2	1:37	Red Lake, Minnesota, United States	
Loss	9–5	Anthony Morrison	Submission (punches)	ROF 36 – Demolition	December 4, 2009	1	1:09	Denver, Colorado, United States	Drops to Featherweight
Loss	9–4	Mark Bocek	Submission (rear naked choke)	UFC 91	November 15, 2008	3	3:16	Las Vegas, Nevada, United States	
Loss	9–3	Nate Diaz	Submission (triangle choke)	UFC Fight Night 12	January 23, 2008	1	3:39	Las Vegas, Nevada, United States	
Win	9–2	Jorge Gurgel	Decision (unanimous)	UFC 77	October 20, 2007	3	5:00	Cincinnati, Ohio, United States	
Loss	8–2	Kenny Florian	Submission (punches)	UFC 73	July 7, 2007	1	4:30	Sacramento, California, United States	
Win	8–1	Olly Bradstreet	Submission (rear naked choke)	ROF 28: Evolution	February 16, 2007	1	1:47	Broomfield, Colorado, United States	
Win	7–1	Rocky Johnson	Submission (rear naked choke)	ROF 27: Collision Course	December 9, 2006	1	2:27	Denver, Colorado, United States	
Win	6–1	Marshall Martin	Submission (side choke)	Fight Force: Butte Brawl 2	July 22, 2006	1	3:54	Butte, Montana, United States	
Loss	5–1	Fabio Holanda	TKO (punches)	TKO Major League MMA 25: Confrontation	May 5, 2006	2	4:30	Montreal, Quebec, Canada	
Win	5–0	James Martinez	Submission (triangle choke)	ROF 23: Impact	April 1, 2006	1	1:14	Colorado, United States	
Win	4–0	Luke Caudillo	Submission (rear naked choke)	ROF 20: Elite	December 10, 2005	1	1:33	Castle Rock, Colorado, United States	Won ROF Lightweight Championship
Win	3–0	Alonzo Martinez	Submission (rear naked choke)	ROF 19: Showdown	September 10, 2005	2	1:14	Castle Rock, Colorado, United States	
Win	2–0	Josh Arocho	Submission (triangle choke)	ROF 17: Unstoppable	June 18, 2005	1	0:44	Castle Rock, Colorado, United States	
Win	1–0	Eric Payne	Submission (rear naked choke)	ROF 15: Inferno	February 12, 2005	1	2:54	Colorado, United States	
