= The Ultimate Fighter 4 =

UFC mixed martial arts television series and event in 2006

- Season 4
- Starring: Dana White

Release
- Original network: Spike TV
- Original release: August 17 – November 11, 2006

Season chronology
- ← Previous; The Ultimate Fighter 3 Next → The Ultimate Fighter 5

The Ultimate Fighter 4 is the fourth season of the mixed martial arts reality television series The Ultimate Fighter. It premiered on August 17, 2006, immediately after the conclusion of UFC Fight Night 6. The finale was aired on November 11, 2006.

This series featured a change from the usual Ultimate Fighter format. Instead of UFC hopefuls, the cast was composed of fighters that had fought in the UFC but had yet to win a UFC title. The winners in the middleweight and welterweight divisions earned a UFC title shot in their division and a $100,000 purse, along with a $100,000 sponsorship deal with Xyience. Instead of coaches, prominent trainers and UFC fighters acted as advisors. Randy Couture, Georges St-Pierre, Marc Laimon, the grappling instructor from seasons 1 and 2, and Mark DellaGrotte, Kenny Florian's kickboxing trainer, were the advisers. The cast still lived in seclusion in the Las Vegas house.

The rules were the same as in The Ultimate Fighter 3, where preliminary round matches were two rounds with a sudden victory round in case of a tie, and all fighters had to win a preliminary match before advancing to the semi-final round. The team that had won the last match decided the next match, with a coin toss deciding which team set the first matchup.

The winners of each division were scheduled to have their title shot during the first half of 2007. Matt Serra defeated Georges St-Pierre for the UFC Welterweight Championship, while Lutter lost to Anderson Silva in a non-title bout. The bout was originally to be for Silva's UFC Middleweight Championship, however, the bout was changed to a non-title bout when Lutter failed to make weight.

Principal filming began on May 21, 2006.

== Cast ==
=== Coaches ===
- Randy Couture, coach
- Georges St-Pierre, coach
- Mark DellaGrotte, Muay Thai/kickboxing coach
- Marc Laimon, Brazilian jiu-jitsu coach
- Rich Franklin, guest coach
- Chuck Liddell, guest coach
- Matt Hughes, guest coach

=== Fighters ===
Team Mojo

- Middleweights: Pete Sell, Scott Smith, Patrick Côté, Edwin DeWees
- Welterweights: Shonie Carter, Chris Lytle, Matt Serra, Din Thomas

Team No Love

- Middleweight: Travis Lutter, Charles McCarthy, Gideon Ray, Jorge Rivera
- Welterweights: Rich Clementi, Mikey Burnett, Jeremy Jackson, Pete Spratt

=== Others ===
- Host: Dana White
- Narrator: Mike Rowe

== Episodes ==
Episode 1: The Comeback Begins (Original Air Date Aug 16, 2006)

- The fighters are introduced and each fighter picks a colored jersey from a bin to decide teams. The teams also name themselves, Team Mojo in grey jerseys and Team No Love in blue.
- Matt Serra begins to emerge as Team Mojo's unofficial captain.
- Team No Love wins the coin toss and gain control of the first matchup. They pick Rich Clementi to fight against Shonie Carter.
- Shonie Carter defeated Rich Clementi via unanimous decision after two rounds.
- During the match, Serra was acting as a cornerman for Carter.
- Team Mojo gains control of matchups.

Episode 2: Blood Bath (Original Air Date Aug 24, 2006)

- White announces that eliminated fighters will not leave the show, thus Rich Clementi will continue to live and train with the cast and be available as a replacement should someone drop out of the competition.
- Team Mojo plans a matchup strategy at a secret firepit meeting outside the house. Notes on the plan, jotted by Shonie Carter, were left on the kitchen counter and discovered by members of the grey team. It is not known if Team No Love ever discovered the notes.
- Team Mojo selects Edwin DeWees to fight Gideon Ray for the first middleweight matchup.
- Edwin DeWees defeated Gideon Ray via unanimous decision after three rounds.
- In an extremely bloody match, Ray opened up a gash in DeWees' forehead with an elbow in the second round. The match was ruled a draw after the second round, prompting a third "sudden victory" round.
- Team Mojo retains matchup control.

Episode 3: Passing Guard (Original Air Date Aug 31, 2006)

- The fighters watch UFC 60: Hughes vs. Gracie with Georges St-Pierre. Matt Serra, who trained with the Gracies, is surprised with the ease of which Matt Hughes was able to defeat Royce Gracie, and says he will always regard Gracie as a legend in the sport. Serra becomes perturbed when grappling coach Marc Laimon questions Gracie's significance to the sport.
- Thinking that he will be picked to fight, Jeremy Jackson begins training in preparation for a fight that he believes will happen between himself and Chris Lytle after an apparent admission by Din Thomas at a dinner table conversation.
- For the welterweight bout selection, Team Mojo instead selects Pete Spratt from Team No Love to fight Lytle.
- Chris Lytle defeated Pete Spratt via submission (guillotine choke) at 2:06 of the first round.
- Team Mojo retains matchup control.

Episode 4: The Funk (Original Air Date Sep 7, 2006)

- Pete Sell and Scott Smith come down with a rash that was diagnosed later as a staph infection, which White insists was something one of the fighters brought with them and was not at the facility already. The infection soon spreads to about half of the residents at the house.
- Jeremy Jackson is expelled from the house after leaving the house without permission, which is a violation of show rules. He met a female lifeguard when his team took a day to work out at the local YMCA, and asked her to meet with him. He tried to sneak out of the house, but the cameras were able to film him jumping the fence.
- White comes to the house the next day and personally announces Jackson's expulsion.
- The fighters muse at what a mistake it was that Jackson made, throwing away an opportunity like that.
- Due to their other middleweights still suffering from staph, Team Mojo picks Smith to fight, and have matched him with Travis Lutter.
- Travis Lutter defeated Scott Smith via submission (rear naked choke) at 1:13 in the first round.
- Team No Love wins their first match and regains control of matchups.

Episode 5: Flip-A-Coin (Original Air Date Sep 14, 2006)

- To replace the newly evicted Jeremy Jackson, Team No Love decides to flip a coin to decide which eliminated welterweight, Pete Spratt or Rich Clementi, should replace him. Jorge Rivera's coin toss allows Spratt to take Jackson's place
- Spratt initially felt Clementi may have been more deserving of the spot, but he takes the spot eventually after some deliberation.
- Shonie Carter is starting to grate on the nerves of the members of the house, especially Team No Love, with his late-night antics and "art projects." Carter does not deny he is being deliberately annoying.
- With control over the match selection process, the blue team chooses Mikey Burnett to fight Team Mojo's Din Thomas, who was still suffering with staph.
- White says that Thomas is actually his pick on winning the show.
- Din Thomas defeated Mikey Burnett via submission (triangle choke) at 2:30 of the first round.
- Thomas, who confides that his staph is under control through medication, clinches a spot in the semi-finals and matchup control returns to Team Mojo.

Episode 6: Captain Miserable (Original Air Date Sep 21, 2006)

- Charles McCarthy's generally depressive attitude earns the ire of his housemates, who nicknamed him "Captain Miserable."
- Jorge Rivera's girlfriend gives birth to a baby girl, and Randy Couture personally visits the house to show videos of the birth to Rivera.
- UFC Middleweight Champion, Rich Franklin, visits Las Vegas and is a guest trainer for a week. There is a bit of discomfort that one of the middleweights in the cast could conceivably challenge him for the title, but the cast is very complimentary toward him and his recent victory over David Loiseau.
- Team Mojo picks Pete Sell to fight McCarthy, with the remaining middleweight matchup will be Rivera against Patrick Côté.
- Pete Sell defeated Charles McCarthy via unanimous decision after three rounds.
- The sudden victory round was scored 10–9 by all judges.

Episode 7: Drop to a Knee (Original Air Date Sep 28, 2006)

- Rich Franklin's welcome is worn, as he criticizes the fighters for their languid approach to cardio training and mistrust between him and the middleweights keeps them from training with him. The general consensus is that Franklin is here to spy on the middleweights, while Franklin believes he was brought in to stir some conflict among the middleweights. He also gives some questionable advice to Matt Serra, that to avoid the stand-up game he should drop to one knee at the beginning of the round, which would prohibit kicks as he would technically be a downed opponent. Everyone thinks of it as a joke, while Franklin seems to be sincere with his suggestion.
- Charles McCarthy talked to Rich Franklin about the advice he gave to Serra since everybody in the house was talking about it the night before. Then, after Team Mojo found out, Patrick Cote drew a cartoon of McCarthy as Captain Miserable and put the drawing in the fridge, but McCarthy did not react at all after seeing the cartoon.
- Matt Serra defeated Pete Spratt via submission (strikes) at 3:26 in the first round.

Episode 8: True Colors (Original Air Date Oct 6, 2006)

- Shonie Carter trains with Team No Love for a day, which he decided to do unilaterally. In the process, he angers both teams.
- UFC Light Heavyweight Champion Chuck Liddell visits the cast as a guest trainer for a week.
- Patrick Côté defeated Jorge Rivera via unanimous decision after two rounds.

Episode 9: Semi-Final Match-Ups (Original Air Date Oct 12, 2006)

- Matt Hughes, UFC Welterweight Champion, arrives unannounced as a guest trainer. Georges St-Pierre decides to leave practice for a time while Hughes is here since he is scheduled for a title fight with him in the future, which Hughes ribs St-Pierre about later. Hughes also rubs some of the fighters the wrong way.
- The remaining fighters are interviewed by White and the trainers to determine semi-final matchups. After the interviews, they decide that for the welterweights they will pair Din Thomas vs. Chris Lytle and Shonie Carter vs. Matt Serra, and for the middleweights they will pair Edwin Dewees vs. Patrick Côté and Travis Lutter vs. Pete Sell.
- Chris Lytle defeated Din Thomas via unanimous decision after three rounds.
- Incidentally, both fighters were main training partners for each other, yet accepted the fight and continued to train together after matchups were made. The timekeeper committed an error in the first round, adding an extra minute to what ordinarily is a five-minute round.

Episode 10: Carter vs. Serra (Original Air Date Oct 19, 2006)

- Tensions come to head between Matt Serra and Marc Laimon when they have an open shouting match during training, with Serra chastising Laimon for his disrespectful attitude in general and especially toward the Gracies. He objected to Laimon's remarks about Royce Gracie, and how he lost to Matt Hughes at UFC 60.
- Jorge Rivera dons a clown's wig and nose, and a pair of speedos, and dubs himself "Phony Carter." No reaction from Shonie Carter, as Rivera intends for Carter to learn of his parody when the show airs.
- Matt Serra defeated Shonie Carter via unanimous decision after three rounds.
- Ironically, Carter asked Clementi to be his corner. Serra advances to the finals and faces Chris Lytle.

Episode 11: Lutter vs. Sell (Original Air Date Oct 26, 2006)

- Pete Sell trains with Chuck Liddell for his upcoming fight with Travis Lutter. Lutter, the only fighter from Team No Love in the semi-finals, finds himself deprived of training partners, and approaches coach Mark DellaGrotte for training and preparation.
- Boredom overcomes the house as the fighters now eliminated starts a food fight in the house. Mikey Burnett also tries to ram through a wall with a running start, which he only succeeded in denting the wall.
- Travis Lutter defeats Pete Sell via unanimous decision after three rounds.
- Lutter dominates most of the fight, achieving takedowns in all three rounds and using elbows and submission attempts to stifle Sell's offense.

Episode 12: Côté vs. Dewees (Original Air Date Nov 2, 2006)

- Boredom continues and a few of the cast begin to play practical jokes on one another, especially on Charles McCarthy, who has drawn ire for eating other people's food.
- Mikey Burnett is informed that he will need neck surgery in order to continue fighting. He is indecisive about whether he wants to continue fighting or pursue something else. He eventually decides to opt for surgery, and will not be able to fight for a year or so.
- Patrick Côté defeated Edwin Dewees via unanimous decision after three rounds.
- Côté dominates the entire fight, landing some hard punches and scoring points with takedowns, before winning 30–27 on all three judges' score cards.
- The fighters each talk about what they want to do after the show. All say that they gained some good experience from the time in the house, except for McCarthy, who said that it was difficult for anyone with "depth to their character" to enjoy such a situation.

== Tournament Bracket ==
=== Welterweight Bracket ===
Quarter-finals
Rich Clementi	2
Shonie Carter	UD
Pete Spratt *	1
Matt Serra	SUB
Pete Spratt	1
Chris Lytle	SUB
Mikey Burnett	1
Din Thomas	SUB

Semi-finals
Shonie Carter	3
Matt Serra	UD
Chris Lytle	UD
Din Thomas	3

Final
Matt Serra	SD
Chris Lytle	3

* Jeremy Jackson was expelled from the show before fighting. Spratt was chosen as his replacement.

=== Middleweight Bracket ===
Quarter-finals
Charles McCarthy	UD
Pete Sell	3
Travis Lutter	SUB
Scott Smith	1
Jorge Rivera	UD
Patrick Côté	2
Gideon Ray	UD
Edwin DeWees	3

Semi-finals
Pete Sell	UD
Travis Lutter	3
Patrick Côté	UD
Edwin DeWees	3

Final
Travis Lutter	SUB
Patrick Côté	1

Legend
	Team Mojo
	Team No Love
UD	Unanimous Decision
SD	Split Decision
SUB	Submission

== The Ultimate Fighter 4 Finale ==
The Ultimate Fighter: The Comeback Finale
- The poster for The Ultimate Fighter: The Comeback Finale
- Promotion: Ultimate Fighting Championship
- Date: November 11, 2006
- Venue: Hard Rock Hotel and Casino
- City: Las Vegas, Nevada

Event chronology
UFC 64: Unstoppable	The Ultimate Fighter: The Comeback Finale	UFC 65: Bad Intentions

The Ultimate Fighter: The Comeback Finale (also known as The Ultimate Fighter 4 Finale) was a mixed martial arts event held by the Ultimate Fighting Championship (UFC) on November 11, 2006. Featured were the finals from The Ultimate Fighter 4 in both the Middleweight and Welterweight divisions.

=== Results ===
Main Card
Weight class				Method	Round	Time	Notes
Welterweight	Matt Serra	def.	Chris Lytle	Decision (split) (30–27, 27–30, 30–27)	3	5:00	(Note: Serra wins to become the Season 4 Welterweight winner of The Ultimate Fighter and a title shot against the UFC Welterweight champion at UFC 69.)
Middleweight	Travis Lutter	def.	Patrick Côté	Submission (armbar)	1	2:18	(Note: Lutter wins to become the Season 4 Middleweight winner of The Ultimate Fighter and a title shot against the UFC Middleweight champion Anderson Silva at UFC 67.)
Lightweight	Din Thomas	def.	Rich Clementi	Submission (rear-naked choke)	2	3:11
Middleweight	Jorge Rivera	def.	Edwin Dewees	TKO (punches)	1	2:37
Preliminary Card
Welterweight	Pete Spratt	def.	Jeremy Jackson	TKO (neck injury)	2	1:11
Middleweight	Scott Smith	def.	Pete Sell	KO (punch)	2	3:25	(Note: This bout was aired on the broadcast.)
Middleweight	Charles McCarthy	def.	Gideon Ray	Submission (armbar)	1	4:43
Middleweight	Martin Kampmann	def.	Thales Leites	Decision (unanimous) (29–28, 29–27, 29–27)	3	5:00	(Note: This bout was aired on the broadcast.)

=== Bonus awards ===
- Fight of the Night: Scott Smith vs. Pete Sell
- Submission of the Night: Travis Lutter

== See also ==
- Ultimate Fighting Championship
- List of UFC champions
- List of UFC events
- 2006 in UFC
- The Ultimate Fighter
- List of current UFC fighters
