= UFC 53 =

UFC mixed martial arts event in 2005

UFC 53: Heavy Hitters
- The poster for UFC 53: Heavy Hitters
- Promotion: Ultimate Fighting Championship
- Date: June 4, 2005
- Venue: Boardwalk Hall
- City: Atlantic City, New Jersey
- Attendance: 12,000
- Total gate: $1,100,000
- Buyrate: 90,000

Event chronology
UFC 52: Couture vs Liddell 2	UFC 53: Heavy Hitters	UFC Ultimate Fight Night

UFC 53: Heavy Hitters was a mixed martial arts event held by the Ultimate Fighting Championship on June 4, 2005, at the Boardwalk Hall in Atlantic City, New Jersey. The event was broadcast live on pay-per-view in the United States, and later released on DVD.

== History ==
This event was originally scheduled to take place at the Yokohama Arena in Japan with an Interim Heavyweight Championship bout between Andrei Arlovski and Mirko Filipović serving as the main event. However the lack of sponsorship for the event forced the event to be moved to Atlantic City.

Initially, former champion Ricco Rodriguez was slated to contend for the Heavyweight Championship, but withdrew from the bout, citing complications with his training camp. Headlining the card opposite of Interim Heavyweight Champion Arlovski, instead, was Miletich protégé Justin Eilers. Although there was some criticism directed at the UFC for giving Eilers a title shot after coming off a knockout loss to Paul Buentello at UFC 51, the UFC explained that Buentello was not medically cleared to fight when the main event was originally scheduled. This was Forrest Griffin's first fight after winning The Ultimate Fighter show.

== Results ==
Main Card
Weight class				Method	Round	Time	Notes
Heavyweight	Andrei Arlovski (ic)	def.	Justin Eilers	TKO (punches)	1	4:10	(Note: For the interim UFC Heavyweight Championship. It was realized that Eilers had injured his knee in the bout, prompting the referee to stop the fight as Eilers could not defend himself.)
Welterweight	Karo Parisyan	def.	Matt Serra	Decision (unanimous) (30–27, 30–27, 29–28)	3	5:00
Middleweight	Rich Franklin	def.	Evan Tanner (c)	TKO (doctor stoppage)	4	3:25	(Note: For the UFC Middleweight Championship.)
Light Heavyweight	Forrest Griffin	def.	Bill Mahood	Submission (rear-naked choke)	1	2:18
Heavyweight	Paul Buentello	def.	Kevin Jordan	Submission (guillotine choke)	1	4:00
Preliminary card
Middleweight	Nate Quarry	def.	Shonie Carter	TKO (punches)	1	2:37	(Note: The bout, although preliminary, was aired on the broadcast.)
Middleweight	David Loiseau	def.	Charles McCarthy	TKO (spinning back kick and flying knee)	2	2:10	(Note: The bout, although preliminary, was aired on the broadcast.)
Welterweight	Nick Diaz	def.	Koji Oishi	KO (punches)	1	1:24	(Note: The bout, although preliminary, was aired on the broadcast.)

== Encyclopedia awards ==
The following fighters were honored in the October 2011 book titled UFC Encyclopedia.

- Fight of the Night: Rich Franklin vs. Evan Tanner
- Knockout of the Night: David Loiseau
- Submission of the Night: Paul Buentello

== See also ==
- Ultimate Fighting Championship
- List of UFC champions
- List of UFC events
- 2005 in UFC

== Sources ==
- UFC 53: Heavy Hitters Results on Sherdog.com
- "Ultimate Fighting Championship Cards" on Wrestling Information Archives
