= UFC 58 =

UFC mixed martial arts event in 2006

UFC 58: USA vs. Canada
- The poster for UFC 58: USA vs. Canada
- Promotion: Ultimate Fighting Championship
- Date: March 4, 2006
- Venue: Mandalay Bay Events Center
- City: Las Vegas, Nevada
- Attendance: 9,569 (8,183 paid)
- Total gate: $1,758,450
- Buyrate: 300,000

Event chronology
UFC 57: Liddell vs Couture 3	UFC 58: USA vs. Canada	Ultimate Fight Night 4

UFC 58: USA vs. Canada was a mixed martial arts event held by the Ultimate Fighting Championship on March 4, 2006. It was held at the Mandalay Bay Events Center on the Las Vegas Strip in Nevada, and broadcast live on pay-per-view in the United States.

== Background ==
In keeping with the theme of the card, most of the fights featured an American fighter against a Canadian fighter.

Five of the seven Canadian fighters featured, Icho Larenas, Sam Stout, Mark Hominick, Georges St-Pierre, and David Loiseau, were at the time champions in the Canadian TKO Major League MMA promotion.

The show drew a live gate of $1,758,450. The disclosed fighter payroll for UFC 58 was $207,000.

The final scorecard for United States vs. Canada was United States 5, Canada 3.

This event also featured the return of the lightweight division to the UFC, which had been suspended since UFC 49

== Results ==
Main Card
Weight class				Method	Round	Time	Notes
Middleweight	Rich Franklin (c)	def.	David Loiseau	Decision (unanimous) (50–43, 50–42, 50–42)	5	5:00	(Note: For the UFC Middleweight Championship)
Middleweight	Mike Swick	def.	Steve Vigneault	Submission (guillotine choke)	1	2:09
Welterweight	Georges St-Pierre	def.	B.J. Penn	Decision (split) (29–28, 28–29, 29–28)	3	5:00
Middleweight	Nate Marquardt	def.	Joe Doerksen	Decision (unanimous) (30–27, 30–27, 30–27)	3	5:00
Lightweight	Mark Hominick	def.	Yves Edwards	Submission (triangle armbar)	2	1:52
Preliminary Card
Lightweight	Sam Stout	def.	Spencer Fisher	Decision (split) (29–28, 29–28, 28–29)	3	5:00	(Note: Fisher was a late replacement for Kenny Florian, who was injured while training for this fight. This was the UFC's first lightweight match since the division was suspended in 2004.)
Light Heavyweight	Jason Lambert	def.	Rob MacDonald	Submission (kimura)	1	1:54
Heavyweight	Tom Murphy	def.	Icho Larenas	TKO (punches)	3	1:59	(Note: Larenas was a late substitute for Kristof Midoux.)

== Reported payout ==
Georges St. Pierre: $48,000

Rich Franklin: $32,000

Nathan Marquardt: $30,000

BJ Penn: $25,000

Tom Murphy: $10,000

Mike Swick: $10,000

David Loiseau: $9,000

Spencer Fisher: $8,000

Yves Edwards: $8,000

Rob Macdonald: $5,000

Joe Doerksen: $5,000

Jason Lambert: $4,000

Mark Hominick: $4,000

Sam Stout: $4,000

Icho Larenas: $3,000

Steve Vigneault: $2,000

Disclosed Fighter Payroll: $207,000

== Encyclopedia awards ==
The following fighters were honored in the October 2011 book titled UFC Encyclopedia.

- Fight of the Night: Rich Franklin vs. David Loiseau and Georges St-Pierre vs. B.J. Penn
- Knockout of the Night: Tom Murphy
- Submission of the Night: Mark Hominick

== See also ==
- Ultimate Fighting Championship
- List of UFC champions
- List of UFC events
- 2006 in UFC

== Sources ==
- Mixed martial arts show results, Mandalay Bay, March 4, 2006 (PDF), Nevada State Athletic Commission, retrieved March 20, 2006
- "Franklin Dominates Loiseau; 'Rush' Beats Penn at UFC 58" by Thomas Gerbasi, UFC.tv, March 5, 2006, retrieved March 5, 2006
- UFC PPV Buys Explode in 2006
- UFC Fighter Salaries for 2006 (includes fighter salaries for UFC 58)
