= UFC 49 =

UFC mixed martial arts event in 2004

UFC 49: Unfinished Business
- The poster for UFC 49: Unfinished Business
- Promotion: Ultimate Fighting Championship
- Date: August 21, 2004
- Venue: MGM Grand Arena
- City: Las Vegas, Nevada
- Attendance: 12,100 (paid 8,597)
- Total gate: $1,293,035
- Buyrate: 80,000
- Total purse: $535,000

Event chronology
UFC 48: Payback	UFC 49: Unfinished Business	UFC 50: The War of '04

UFC 49: Unfinished Business was a mixed martial arts event held by the Ultimate Fighting Championship on August 21, 2004, at the MGM Grand Arena in Las Vegas, Nevada. The event was broadcast live on pay-per-view in the United States, and later released on DVD.

== History ==
It featured the anticipated rubber match between Light Heavyweight Champion Vitor Belfort and Randy Couture, following a disappointing doctor's stoppage in their last encounter at UFC 46.

This event featured the last UFC fight in the lightweight division until UFC 58 on March 4, 2006.

== Results ==
Main Card
Weight class				Method	Round	Time	Notes
Light Heavyweight	Randy Couture	def.	Vitor Belfort (c)	TKO (doctor stoppage)	3	5:00	(Note: For the UFC Light Heavyweight Championship.)
Middleweight	Joe Riggs	def.	Joe Doerksen	TKO (submission to elbows)	2	3:39
Light Heavyweight	Chuck Liddell	def.	Vernon White	KO (punch)	1	4:05
Middleweight	David Terrell	def.	Matt Lindland	KO (punches)	1	0:24
Heavyweight	Justin Eilers	def.	Mike Kyle	KO (punch)	1	1:14
Preliminary card
Welterweight	Chris Lytle	def.	Ronald Jhun	Submission (guillotine choke)	2	1:17
Welterweight	Karo Parisyan	def.	Nick Diaz	Decision (split) (29–28, 30–27, 28–29)	3	5:00
Lightweight	Yves Edwards	def.	Josh Thomson	KO (flying head kick and punches)	1	4:32

== Encyclopedia awards ==
The following fighters were honored in the October 2011 book titled UFC Encyclopedia.

- Fight of the Night: Chuck Liddell vs. Vernon White
- Knockout of the Night: David Terrell
- Submission of the Night: Chris Lytle

== See also ==
- Ultimate Fighting Championship
- List of UFC champions
- List of UFC events
- 2004 in UFC
