= Pete Sell =

American mixed martial artist

- Born: August 5, 1982 (age 44)
- Other names: Drago
- Nationality: American
- Height: 5 ft 11 in (1.80 m)
- Weight: 171 lb (78 kg; 12.2 st)
- Division: Middleweight; Welterweight
- Reach: 75 in (190 cm)
- Stance: Orthodox
- Fighting out of: Westbury, New York, United States
- Team: Serra-Longo Fight Team
- Rank: Black belt in Brazilian Jiu-Jitsu under Matt Serra
- Years active: 2002–2015

Mixed martial arts record
- Total: 17
- Wins: 10
- By submission: 4
- By decision: 6
- Losses: 7
- By knockout: 5
- By decision: 2

Other information
- Mixed martial arts record from Sherdog

Peter 'Drago' Sell, (born August 5, 1982) is an American mixed martial artist who most recently competed in the Welterweight division. A professional competitor since 2002, he has formerly competed for the UFC, and was a competitor on The Ultimate Fighter: The Comeback.

== Career ==
=== Ultimate Fighting Championship ===
Sell made his debut with the UFC at UFC 51, defeating Top contender Phil Baroni by guillotine choke submission in what was considered a major upset, considering he was a 5–1 underdog.

After a controversial Technical knockout stoppage in his first fight against The Ultimate Fighter veteran Nate Quarry at UFC Ultimate Fight Night, Sell was then seen as a middleweight contestant on The Ultimate Fighter: The Comeback, which premiered on August 17, 2006. He entered the competition alongside Matt Serra, who competed one weight class below Sell in the welterweight division. Sell defeated "Chainsaw" Charles McCarthy to move on the semi-finals of the competition, where he lost to the ultimate winner of the tournament Travis Lutter. Although Sell did not proceed the finals, he was featured on the undercard of the season finale where he lost to Scott Smith in a back and forth war that ended via sudden highlight reel knockout.

He then fought and lost to Thales Leites at UFC 69. He lost the fight via unanimous decision.

His next fight was a rematch against Nathan Quarry, at UFC Fight Night 11. Sell lost to Quarry once again via KO in the third round.

Sell made his second appearance on The Ultimate Fighter as a trainer for Team Serra for season 6, The Ultimate Fighter: Team Hughes vs. Team Serra.

Sell has dropped down to welterweight for his latest matches; a victory over Josh Burkman at UFC 90, and a knockout loss to Matt Brown at UFC 96.

His match against Brown was somewhat controversial, as referee Yves Lavigne pulled Matt Brown off of a stunned Pete Sell early in the bout, but quickly after ordered both men to resume fighting. After the event, Sell was still visibly dazed, and was unable to mount any offense, or competently defend himself. Eventually Brown knocked Sell out with a series of punches 1:32 into the first round.

=== Post-UFC career ===
After a two-year hiatus from MMA, Sell finally made his return and defeated Elijah Harshbarger via armbar in the second round at Ring of Combat XXXVI.

Sell then faced Nordine Taleb at Ring of Combat 38 on November 18, 2011. Sell lost the bout via technical knockout in the second round.

Sell would then win his next fight via unanimous decision against Mitch Whitesel at Ring of Combat 39 on February 10, 2012.

Sell was expected to face Elijah Harshbarger for a second time at Ring of Combat 49 on September 19, 2014. However, the bout was cancelled for unknown reasons. The bout was rescheduled to September 25, 2015, which Sell lost by unanimous decision.

== Championships and accomplishments ==
- Ring of Combat
  - ROC Middleweight Championship (One time)
- Ultimate Fighting Championship
  - Fight of the Night (One time) vs. Scott Smith
  - UFC.com Awards
    - 2005: Ranked #3 Submission of the Year vs. Phil Baroni
    - 2006: Ranked #6 Fight of the Year vs. Scott Smith
    - 2007: Ranked #6 Fight of the Year vs. Nate Quarry
    - 2008: Ranked #9 Upset of the Year vs. Josh Burkman

== Mixed martial arts record ==
Professional record breakdown
| 17 matches | 10 wins | 7 losses |
| By knockout | 0 | 5 |
| By submission | 4 | 0 |
| By decision | 6 | 2 |

| Res. | Record | Opponent | Method | Event | Date | Round | Time | Location | Notes |
|---|---|---|---|---|---|---|---|---|---|
| Loss | 10–7 | Elijah Harshbarger | Decision (unanimous) | Ring of Combat 52 | September 25, 2015 | 3 | 5:00 | Atlantic City, New Jersey, United States | For Ring of Combat Welterweight Championship. |
| Win | 10–6 | Mitch Whitesel | Decision (unanimous) | Ring of Combat 39 | February 10, 2012 | 3 | 5:00 | Atlantic City, New Jersey, United States | Catchweight (180 lbs) bout. |
| Loss | 9–6 | Nordine Taleb | TKO (punches) | Ring of Combat 38 | November 18, 2011 | 2 | 0:53 | Atlantic City, New Jersey, United States | Lost Ring of Combat Welterweight Championship. |
| Win | 9–5 | Elijah Harshbarger | Submission (armbar) | Ring of Combat 36 | June 17, 2011 | 2 | 3:24 | Atlantic City, New Jersey, United States | Won Ring of Combat Welterweight Championship. |
| Loss | 8–5 | Matt Brown | TKO (punches) | UFC 96 | March 7, 2009 | 1 | 1:32 | Columbus, Ohio, United States | |
| Win | 8–4 | Josh Burkman | Decision (unanimous) | UFC 90 | October 25, 2008 | 3 | 5:00 | Rosemont, Illinois, United States | Welterweight debut. |
| Loss | 7–4 | Nate Quarry | KO (punch) | UFC Fight Night: Thomas vs. Florian | September 19, 2007 | 3 | 0:44 | Las Vegas, Nevada, United States | |
| Loss | 7–3 | Thales Leites | Decision (unanimous) | UFC 69 | April 7, 2007 | 3 | 5:00 | Houston, Texas, United States | |
| Loss | 7–2 | Scott Smith | KO (punch) | The Ultimate Fighter: The Comeback Finale | November 11, 2006 | 2 | 3:25 | Las Vegas, Nevada, United States | Fight of the Night. |
| Win | 7–1 | Landon Showalter | Decision (unanimous) | Ring of Combat 10 | April 14, 2006 | 3 | 5:00 | Atlantic City, New Jersey, United States | |
| Loss | 6–1 | Nate Quarry | TKO (punch) | UFC Ultimate Fight Night | August 6, 2005 | 1 | 0:42 | Las Vegas, Nevada, United States | |
| Win | 6–0 | Phil Baroni | Submission (guillotine choke) | UFC 51 | February 5, 2005 | 3 | 4:19 | Las Vegas, Nevada, United States | |
| Win | 5–0 | Chris Liguori | Submission (rear-naked choke) | Ring of Combat 6 | April 24, 2004 | 3 | 0:41 | Elizabeth, New Jersey, United States | Won the Ring of Combat Middleweight Championship; vacated to sign with UFC. |
| Win | 4–0 | Chris Liguori | Decision (split) | Ring of Combat 4 | August 15, 2003 | 3 | 5:00 | Atlantic City, New Jersey, United States | |
| Win | 3–0 | Derek Johnson | Submission (armbar) | Ring of Combat 3 | June 7, 2003 | 1 | 2:03 | Morristown, New Jersey, United States | |
| Win | 2–0 | Ted Govola | Decision (unanimous) | Ring of Combat 2 | December 7, 2002 | 1 | 10:00 | Secaucus, New Jersey, United States | |
| Win | 1–0 | Rob Biegley | Decision | Vengeance at the Vanderbilt 14 | June 28, 2002 | 1 | 10:00 | Plainview, New York, United States | |
