= Justin Eilers =

American MMA fighter (1978–2008)

- Born: Justin Mark Eilers; June 28, 1978; Boise, Idaho, U.S.
- Died: December 25, 2008 (aged 30); Nampa, Idaho, U.S.
- Height: 6 ft 1 in (185 cm)
- Weight: 235 lb (107 kg; 16 st 11 lb)
- Division: Heavyweight (265 lb)
- Stance: Orthodox
- Fighting out of: Bettendorf, Iowa, U.S.
- Team: Miletich Martial Arts
- Years active: 2002–2008 (MMA)

Mixed martial arts record
- Total: 27
- Wins: 19
- By knockout: 18
- By decision: 1
- Losses: 7
- By knockout: 4
- By decision: 3
- Draws: 1

Other information
- Mixed martial arts record from Sherdog

Justin Mark Eilers (June 28, 1978 – December 25, 2008) was an American professional mixed martial artist, formerly with the UFC, WEC and EliteXC. Known for his ground and pound as well as punching power, he won 18 of 19 career bouts via TKO/KO stoppage.

== Biography ==
Justin Mark Eilers was raised in Nampa, Idaho, and developed an early love of football. He began wrestling in the sixth grade and through Nampa High School, but he missed a football scholarship out of high school due to his low SAT scores, and soon took up karate at a local school. He began competing in small full contact shows around Idaho, where he met up and coming fighter Jens Pulver, who was fighting with the same promotion. Eilers was also friends with Mike Kyle and taught Kyle jiu-jitsu techniques when Kyle was a sophomore in high school. Eilers would actually end up fighting Kyle at UFC 49.

After being accepted to Butte College near Chico, California, Eilers left mixed martial arts behind for football, and was recruited by Iowa State University as a linebacker. He would go on to play for Iowa State for the next four years, After college, Eilers took time off to fully heal a shoulder injury. It was during this time that he had another chance meeting with Jens Pulver, who was now a popular fighter in the UFC. Pulver urged Eilers to try fighting again, and after a few months of training, he made his MMA debut in 2002 facing UFC Hall of Famer Dan Severn at Victory Fighting Championships 3 (a local Iowa MMA organization). He would lose the fight via decision, but the experience pushed Eilers to focus full-time on the sport of mixed martial arts. Just one month later Eilers returned to MMA competition, taking a quick KO victory over Jeff Gerlick at an Extreme Challenge event.

Eilers went undefeated in his next 4 fights, before losing a close split decision victory to Cabbage Correira at SuperBrawl 30. Coming off the loss to Cabbage, Eilers won his next five fights, all by KO, and was signed by the Ultimate Fighting Championship in 2004. His first fight in the octagon was against an old friend from high school, Mike Kyle at UFC 49. Eilers knocked Kyle out in just 1:14 of the first round, but was suspended after the fight by the Nevada State Athletic Commission due to injury sustained to his hand in the fight. He returned in February 2005 at UFC 51 to face top heavyweight contender Paul Buentello. Three minutes into the first round, Eilers was caught by a right hook from Buentello, which ended the fight. Four months later at UFC 53, Eilers would get a title shot, facing Andrei Arlovski. Unfortunately he would suffer another KO loss at the hands of the UFC Heavyweight Champion Arlovski. Eilers suffered extensive injuries in this match, breaking both hands, his jaw, and tearing his ACL.

Following his loss to Arlovski, Eilers took eight months off, and returned to the octagon at UFC 57 to face Brandon Vera. In yet another brutal knock out, he was dazed by a high kick to the top right side of the head and then dropped by a vicious knee to the same area. Eilers was released from the UFC in 2006, and returned to MMA competition at Combat in the Cage 2, finally scoring a KO victory (his first victory in almost 2 years) over Sherman Pendergarst.

In June 2006, Eilers faced Jimmy Ambriz at WEC 21, taking a TKO victory due to doctor stoppage. In his next five fights Eilers proceeded to beat Rocky Batastini (by submission due to strikes), Wade Hamilton (by submission due to strikes), Josh Diekmann (by TKO due to strikes), John Dixon (by submission due to strikes) and Jihoon Kim (by submission due to strikes). Eilers' winning streak came to an end when, on March 9, 2007, he lost to Pedro Rizzo by unanimous decision. The fight took place at the début show of the Undisputed Arena Fighting Championships, and was held in Dallas, Texas.

== Death ==
At 10:45 p.m. on December 25, 2008, Eilers was shot during an apparent domestic dispute by his stepfather, 48-year-old James Robert Malec, at Malec's and his mother's residence in Nampa, Idaho. He died from a single gunshot to the chest. Malec, a former correctional officer, was arrested and charged with second-degree murder.

Eilers left behind a son, who was also in the home that night. Malec was convicted on the lesser charge of manslaughter and sentenced to 15 years in prison.

== Championships and accomplishments ==
- International Fighting Championship
  - IFC U.S. Heavyweight Championship (One time)
  - IFC Battleground Heavyweight Championship (One time)

== Mixed martial arts record ==
Professional record breakdown
27 matches	19 wins	7 losses
By knockout	18	4
By decision	1	3
Draws	1	

Res.	Record	Opponent	Method	Event	Date	Round	Time	Location	Notes
Loss	19–7–1	Antônio Silva	TKO (knees and punches)	EliteXC: Unfinished Business	July 26, 2008	2	0:19	Stockton, California, United States	For the Elite XC Heavyweight Championship; Silva tested positive for steroids post-fight.
Win	19–6–1	Wade Shipp	TKO (punches)	IFC: Caged Combat	April 26, 2008	4	3:50	Nampa, Idaho, United States	
Win	18–6–1	Matt Thompson	Decision (unanimous)	HDNet Fight	October 13, 2007	3	5:00	Dallas, Texas, United States	
Win	17–6–1	Scott Hough	TKO (punches)	FSG: Coliseum Carnage	April 8, 2007	1	4:11	Ames, Iowa, United States	
Loss	16–6–1	Pedro Rizzo	Decision (unanimous)	AOW: Art of War 1	March 9, 2007	3	5:00	Dallas, Texas, United States	
Win	16–5–1	Ji Hoon Kim	TKO (submission to punches)	World Best Fighter: USA vs. Asia	February 3, 2007	1	2:10	Atlantic City, New Jersey, United States	
Win	15–5–1	John Dixson	TKO (submission to punches)	Beatdown in Bakersfield	November 17, 2006	2	0:56	Bakersfield, California, United States	
Win	14–5–1	Josh Diekmann	TKO (punches)	WEC 24	October 12, 2006	1	2:29	Lemoore, California, United States	
Win	13–5–1	Wade Hamilton	TKO (submission to punches)	RMN MMA: Demolition	September 16, 2006	1	2:23	Denver, Colorado, United States	
Win	12–5–1	Rocky Batastini	TKO (submission to punches)	Xtreme Fight Series 1	July 15, 2006	1	2:32	Boise, Idaho, United States	
Win	11–5–1	Jimmy Ambriz	TKO (doctor stoppage)	WEC 21: Tapout	June 15, 2006	1	5:00	Highland, California, United States	
Win	10–5–1	Sherman Pendergarst	KO (punches)	Combat in the Cage 2	May 20, 2006	2	4:34	Atlantic City, New Jersey, United States	
Loss	9–5–1	Brandon Vera	KO (head kick and knee)	UFC 57	February 4, 2006	1	1:25	Las Vegas, Nevada, United States	
Loss	9–4–1	Andrei Arlovski	TKO (punches)	UFC 53	June 4, 2005	1	4:10	Atlantic City, New Jersey, United States	For the interim UFC Heavyweight Championship.
Loss	9–3–1	Paul Buentello	KO (punch)	UFC 51	February 5, 2005	1	3:34	Las Vegas, Nevada, United States	
Win	9–2–1	Mike Kyle	KO (punch)	UFC 49	August 21, 2004	1	1:14	Las Vegas, Nevada, United States	
Win	8–2–1	Mikhail Bogdanov	TKO (corner stoppage)	Euphoria: Russia vs USA	March 13, 2004	1	5:00	Atlantic City, New Jersey, United States	
Win	7–2–1	Vince Lucero	TKO (injury)	SuperBrawl 33	February 7, 2004	1	0:11	Honolulu, Hawaii, United States	
Win	6–2–1	Rocky Batastini	TKO (punches)	IFC: Battleground Tahoe	January 31, 2004	1	2:35	Lake Tahoe, Nevada, United States	Won the vacant IFC Battleground Heavyweight Championship.
Win	5–2–1	Gary Marshall	TKO (punches and elbows)	IFC: Battleground Boise	October 25, 2003	1	4:25	Boise, Idaho, United States	Won the vacant IFC U.S. Heavyweight Championship.
Win	4–2–1	Brian Shepard	TKO (injury)	CFM: Octogono Extremo	September 27, 2003	1	4:00	Monterrey, Mexico	
Loss	3–2–1	Wesley Correira	Decision (split)	SB 30: Collision Course	June 13, 2003	3	5:00	Honolulu, Hawaii, United States	
Draw	3–1–1	Jason Brilz	Draw	VFC 4: Wildcard	April 19, 2003	3	5:00	Council Bluffs, Iowa, United States	
Win	3–1	Johnathan Ivey	TKO (submission to punches)	Iowa Challenge 9	April 5, 2003	1	1:03	Marshalltown, Iowa, United States	
Win	2–1	Seth Peters	TKO (submission to punches)	Iowa Challenge 8	January 11, 2003	1	N/A	Waterloo, Iowa, United States	
Win	1–1	Jeff Gerlick	KO (punch)	MMA Nationals 2002	December 14, 2002	1	2:56	Davenport, Iowa, United States	
Loss	0–1	Dan Severn	Decision (unanimous)	VFC 3: Total Chaos	November 23, 2002	3	5:00	Council Bluffs, Iowa, United States	

== See also ==
- List of male mixed martial artists
