= Tony Fryklund =

American mixed martial arts fighter

- Born: Anthony James Fryklund; March 26, 1971 (age 55); Boston, Massachusetts, United States
- Other names: The Freak
- Height: 6 ft 0 in (1.83 m)
- Weight: 155.6 lb (70.6 kg; 11.11 st)
- Division: Lightweight; Welterweight; Middleweight
- Reach: 68 in (173 cm)
- Stance: Orthodox
- Fighting out of: Bettendorf, Iowa, United States
- Team: Miletich Fighting Systems
- Years active: 1997–2007, 2013

Mixed martial arts record
- Total: 24
- Wins: 14
- By knockout: 7
- By submission: 7
- Losses: 9
- By knockout: 5
- By submission: 3
- By decision: 1
- Draws: 1

Other information
- Mixed martial arts record from Sherdog

Anthony James Fryklund (born March 26, 1971) is an American retired professional mixed martial artist who last competed in the Lightweight division. A professional competitor from 1997 until 2013, he competed for the UFC, the WEC, Bellator, Strikeforce, Cage Rage, and Titan FC.

== Background ==
Born and raised in Boston, Massachusetts, Fryklund was adopted when he was three months old. He began boxing and kickboxing when he was 13, and was often drawn into fights that arose when he tried to defend victims of bullying. He attended Winchester High School and also began judo, wrestling, and karate in his late teens. He later attended Northeastern University and spent two years in the United States Coast Guard, but did not finish his education as he was focused on his job, which was working as a safety manager for a construction company.

== Mixed martial arts career ==
=== Early career ===
Fryklund made his professional MMA debut in 1997, fighting twice at UFC 14. During the first five years of his career, he built up a record of 8 wins and 1 loss.

In Starting 2003, Fryklund fought a who's who of MMA fighters including David Loiseau, Brian Ebersole, Eugene Jackson, Matt Lindland, Ivan Salaverry, and Anderson Silva. His loss to Silva was one of the highlight reel KOs from the British Cage Rage promotion as Fryklund fell to an unconventional reverse elbow.

=== Strikeforce ===
In 2006, Fryklund joined the Strikeforce promotion. He lost both fights there against Duane Ludwig in December 2006 and against Cung Le in June 2007.

=== Bellator Fighting Championships ===
Fryklund returned to fighting after a nearly six-year hiatus as he faced Patrick Cenoble at Bellator 94 on March 28, 2013. The bout was ruled a draw after Cenoble was docked one point in round two.

== Mixed martial arts record ==
Professional record breakdown
24 matches	14 wins	9 losses
By knockout	7	5
By submission	7	3
By decision	0	1
Draws	1	

Res.	Record	Opponent	Method	Event	Date	Round	Time	Location	Notes
Draw	14–9–1	Patrick Cenoble	Draw (split)	Bellator 94	March 28, 2013	3	5:00	Tampa, Florida, United States	Lightweight debut. Cenoble was deducted one point in round 2 for grabbing the fence.
Loss	14–9	Cung Le	KO (punch)	Strikeforce: Shamrock vs. Baroni	June 22, 2007	3	0:25	San Jose, California, United States	Catchweight (180 lbs) bout.
Loss	14–8	Duane Ludwig	TKO (knee)	Strikeforce: Triple Threat	December 8, 2006	2	3:37	San Jose, California, United States	
Loss	14–7	Thomas Denny	Submission (rear-naked choke)	BIB: Beatdown in Bakersfield	November 17, 2006	1	1:32	Bakersfield, California, United States	Return to Welterweight.
Win	14–6	Alex Reid	Submission (heel hook)	Cage Rage 18	September 30, 2006	1	1:32	London, England	
Win	13–6	Brian Dunn	KO (punch)	Titan FC 4	June 9, 2006	1	N/A	Kansas City, Kansas, United States	
Win	12–6	Tommy Gouge	TKO (submission to punches)	Titan FC 3	May 20, 2006	1	N/A	Durant, Oklahoma, United States	
Loss	11–6	Anderson Silva	KO (reverse elbow)	Cage Rage 16	April 22, 2006	1	2:02	London, England	For Cage Rage Middleweight Championship
Loss	11–5	Jonathan Goulet	TKO (cut)	TKO 20: Champion vs Champion	April 2, 2005	1	1:16	Montreal, Quebec, Canada	Welterweight bout.
Loss	11–4	Ivan Salaverry	Submission (body triangle)	UFC 50	October 22, 2004	1	1:36	Atlantic City, New Jersey, United States	
Win	11–3	Chris Myers	TKO	APEX: Genesis	September 5, 2004	2	4:20	Montreal, Quebec, Canada	
Loss	10–3	Matt Lindland	Decision (unanimous)	ROTR 5: Rumble on the Rock 5	May 7, 2004	3	5:00	Honolulu, Hawaii, United States	
Win	10–2	Eugene Jackson	Technical Submission (guillotine choke)	Battleground 1: War Cry	July 19, 2003	1	3:38	Chicago, Illinois, United States	Return to Middleweight.
Win	9–2	Brian Ebersole	Submission (achilles lock)	Dangerzone: Dakota Destruction	April 12, 2003	2	4:37	New Town, North Dakota, United States	
Loss	8–2	David Loiseau	TKO (cut)	UCC 12: Adrenaline	January 25, 2003	1	4:24	Quebec, Canada	Middleweight bout.
Win	8–1	Zach Light	Submission (kimura)	WEC 4	August 31, 2002	1	4:06	Uncasville, Connecticut, United States	
Win	7–1	Rodrigo Ruas	TKO (punches)	UFC 37.5	June 22, 2002	2	3:34	Las Vegas, Nevada, United States	Middleweight bout.
Win	6–1	Jonathan Goulet	KO (punches)	UCC 8: Fast and Furious	March 30, 2002	1	3:45	Quebec, Canada	Welterweight debut.
Win	5–1	Adrian Serrano	KO (punches)	UW: Horn vs Wikan	March 2, 2002	2	3:18	Minnesota, United States	
Win	4–1	Marty Armendarez	Submission (guillotine choke)	Shogun 1: Shogun 1	December 15, 2001	2	0:47	Honolulu, Hawaii, United States	
Win	3–1	Jeremiah O'Neal	Submission (guillotine choke)	EC 44: Extreme Challenge 44	September 15, 2001	1	0:53	Lake Charles, Louisiana, United States	
Win	2–1	Cris Custer	Submission (guillotine choke)	RSF 2: Attack at the Track	June 23, 2001	2	1:30	Chester, West Virginia, United States	
Loss	1–1	Kevin Jackson	Submission (choke)	UFC 14	July 27, 1997	1	0:44	Birmingham, Alabama, United States	
Win	1–0	Donnie Chappell	Submission (choke)	UFC 14	July 27, 1997	1	1:31	Birmingham, Alabama, United States	
