= Gideon Ray =

American mixed martial arts fighter

- Born: Gideon Charles Ray; May 27, 1973 (age 53); Chicago, Illinois, U.S.
- Height: 5 ft 10 in (1.78 m)
- Weight: 170 lb (77 kg; 12 st)
- Division: Middleweight; Welterweight; Lightweight
- Fighting out of: Chicago, Illinois, United States
- Team: Uflacker Academy Chicago; The Gentle Art BJJ
- Rank: Black Belt in Brazilian Jiu-Jitsu under Christian Uflacker; Black Belt in Judo; Black Belt in Tae Kwon Do; Black Belt in Kenpo Karate under Keith Hackney
- Years active: 2000–2012

Mixed martial arts record
- Total: 33
- Wins: 17
- By knockout: 8
- By submission: 8
- By decision: 1
- Losses: 15
- By knockout: 3
- By submission: 5
- By decision: 7
- Draws: 1

Other information
- Mixed martial arts record from Sherdog

Gideon Charles Ray (born May 27, 1973) is an American former professional mixed martial artist. A professional from 2000 until 2012, Ray competed for the UFC, King of the Cage, the Toronto Dragons of the IFL, and was featured on The Ultimate Fighter 4.

== Background ==
Born and raised in Chicago, Ray began training in martial arts from a young age.

== Mixed martial arts ==
=== Early career ===
Ray made his professional debut in 2000, competing primarily at Welterweight, he amassed a record of 8–1–1 before appearing for the UFC.

=== Ultimate Fighting Championship ===
Ray made his UFC debut at UFC 51 on February 5, 2005 against Canadian David Loiseau. He was defeated via TKO due to a doctor stoppage in the first round.

After picking up a win in the regional circuit, Ray returned to the promotion at UFC Ultimate Fight Night, facing Mike Swick. He was defeated via TKO from a combination of punches just 22 seconds into the fight.

After going 4–1 in the regional circuit, Ray tried out for The Ultimate Fighter 4 and made it through to the final cast.

=== The Ultimate Fighter ===
In his quarterfinal matchup against Edwin Dewees, the two fought to a draw after two rounds, which called for a third round. As a cut had opened on Dewees face during the second round and the doctors let the fight continue. Ray lost the third round to a 10-9 decision by the judges. The bout was later called perhaps the bloodiest in Ultimate Fighter history.

At The Ultimate Fighter: The Comeback Finale, Ray faced Charles McCarthy. Ray was defeated near the end of the first round with an armbar submission.

=== International Fight League ===
After being released from the UFC, Ray signed with the IFL, competing for the Toronto Dragons. Ray made his promotional debut at IFL: Connecticut on April 13, 2007. He won via first-round TKO.

Ray next faced Brazilian Delson Heleno at IFL: Las Vegas on June 16, 2007. He was defeated via keylock submission in the second round.

The two later fought in a rematch at the World Grand Prix Semifinals later in November of that year, with Heleno winning again, this time via first-round armbar.

=== Independent promotions ===
After leaving the IFL, Ray went 3–7 in his final 10 fights, retiring in 2012.

== Mixed martial arts record ==
Professional record breakdown
33 matches	17 wins	15 losses
By knockout	8	3
By submission	8	5
By decision	1	7
Draws	1	

Res.	Record	Opponent	Method	Event	Date	Round	Time	Location	Notes
Loss	17–15–1	Shamar Bailey	Decision (unanimous)	Flawless FC 2	December 15, 2012	3	5:00	Chicago, Illinois, United States	
Loss	17–14–1	Dwayne Hinds	Decision (split)	CUFF 4: The Shot	August 20, 2011	3	5:00	Spain	
Loss	17–13–1	Sergej Juskevic	Submission (heel hook)	Wreck MMA: Unstoppable	May 6, 2011	1	1:30	Gatineau, Quebec, Canada	Return to Welterweight.
Loss	17–12–1	Daniel Mason-Straus	Decision (unanimous)	XFO 33	January 23, 2010	3	5:00	Chicago, Illinois, United States	
Win	17–11–1	Luke Caudillo	Decision (unanimous)	Raw Power: MMA	December 10, 2009	3	5:00	Sanabis, Bahrain	
Loss	16–11–1	Darren Elkins	Decision (unanimous)	Hoosier Fight Club 1: Raise Up	November 20, 2009	3	5:00	Valparaiso, Indiana, United States	Lightweight debut.
Win	16–10–1	Brandon Small	Submission (rear-naked choke)	TFC 17: Total Fight Challenge 17	October 10, 2009	1	0:46	Hammond, Indiana, United States	
Loss	15–10–1	John Alessio	TKO (punches)	SuperFights MMA: Night of Combat 2	October 11, 2008	1	0:45	Las Vegas, Nevada, United States	
Loss	15–9–1	Brandon Melendez	Submission (rear-naked choke)	WC 4: Warriors Collide 4	July 19, 2008	1	3:23	Colorado, United States	
Win	15–8–1	Bryan Craven	TKO (cut)	WC 3: Warriors Collide 3	May 16, 2008	1	2:48	Pueblo, Colorado, United States	
Loss	14–8–1	Nabil Khatib	Decision (unanimous)	HCF: Crow's Nest	March 29, 2008	3	5:00	Gatineau, Quebec, Canada	
Loss	14–7–1	Delson Heleno	Submission (armbar)	IFL: World Grand Prix Semifinals	November 3, 2007	1	1:57	Hoffman Estates, Illinois, United States	Catchweight (175 lbs) bout.
Loss	14–6–1	Delson Heleno	Submission (keylock)	IFL: Las Vegas	June 16, 2007	2	1:29	Las Vegas, Nevada, United States	
Win	14–5–1	Gabe Casillas	TKO (strikes)	International Fight League	April 13, 2007	1	2:39	Uncasville, Connecticut, United States	
Loss	13–5–1	Charles McCarthy	Submission (armbar)	The Ultimate Fighter: The Comeback Finale	November 11, 2006	1	4:43	Las Vegas, Nevada, United States	Middleweight bout.
Loss	13–4–1	Jason MacDonald	Decision (unanimous)	ECC 1: Extreme Cage Combat 1	April 29, 2006	3	5:00	Halifax, Nova Scotia, Canada	
Win	13–3–1	Jerry Spiegel	TKO	XFO 10: Explosion	March 18, 2006	1	1:55	Lakemoor, Illinois, United States	
Win	12–3–1	Brendan Seguin	Submission (heel hook)	KOTC: Redemption on the River	February 17, 2006	1	2:52	Moline, Illinois, United States	Middleweight bout.
Win	11–3–1	Chris Fontaine	TKO	EFC 4: Extreme Fighting Challenge 4	October 15, 2005	2	N/A	Prince George, British Columbia, Canada	
Win	10–3–1	Trevor Garrett	Submission (rear naked choke)	KOTC: Xtreme Edge	September 17, 2005	1	2:17	Indianapolis, Indiana, United States	
Loss	9–3–1	Mike Swick	TKO (punches)	UFC Ultimate Fight Night	August 6, 2005	1	0:22	Las Vegas, Nevada, United States	
Win	9–2–1	Dennis Reed	TKO	XFO 6: Judgment Day	June 25, 2005	1	3:11	Lakemoor, Illinois, United States	
Loss	8–2–1	David Loiseau	TKO (doctor stoppage)	UFC 51: Super Saturday	February 5, 2005	1	5:00	Las Vegas, Nevada, United States	Middleweight bout.
Win	8–1–1	Shawn McCully	TKO (submission to strikes)	SMA: Shootfighting Martial Arts	November 13, 2005	N/A	N/A	Springfield, Illinois, United States	
Win	7–1–1	Rhomez Brower	TKO	Combat: Do Fighting Challenge 1	October 23, 2004	2	N/A	Cicero, Illinois, United States	
Loss	6–1–1	Jason Black	Decision (unanimous)	IHC 7: Crucible	June 5, 2004	3	5:00	Hammond, Indiana, United States	
Win	6–0–1	Jason Medina	KO	EC 51: Extreme Challenge 51	August 2, 2003	2	1:41	St. Charles, Illinois, United States	Return to Welterweight.
Draw	5–0–1	Brian Gassaway	Draw	Shooto: Midwest Fighting	May 21, 2003	3	5:00	Hammond, Indiana, United States	Middleweight debut.
Win	5–0	Matt Shaw	TKO (submission to strikes)	FCC 9: Freestyle Combat Challenge 9	January 11, 2003	N/A	N/A	Racine, Wisconsin, United States	
Win	4–0	Justin Wieman	TKO (cut)	IHC 5: Tribulation	October 26, 2002	1	2:20	Hammond, Indiana, United States	
Win	3–0	Derrick Noble	Submission (guillotine choke)	IHC 4: Armageddon	May 18, 2002	3	2:25	Hammond, Indiana, United States	
Win	2–0	Moto Asai	Submission (ankle lock)	FCC 6: Freestyle Combat Challenge 6	January 5, 2002	2	2:18	Racine, Wisconsin, United States	
Win	1–0	Eddie Harps	Submission (guillotine choke)	TCC: Total Combat Challenge	February 24, 2000	1	1:30	Chicago, Illinois, United States	
