= Cesar Gracie Jiu-Jitsu =

Mixed martial arts and Brazilian jiu-jitsu gym based in Pleasant Hill, California

Cesar Gracie Academy
- Est.: 1992
- Founded by: Cesar Gracie
- Primary owners: Cesar Gracie
- Primary trainers: David Terrell; Ismael Mota; Jake Shields; Nate Diaz; Nick Diaz; Richard Perez
- Prominent fighters: David Terrell; Gilbert Melendez; Jake Shields; Joe Schilling; Nate Diaz; Nick Diaz
- Training facilities: Brentwood, California, U.S. Pleasant Hill, California, U.S.
- Website: www.graciefighter.com

Cesar Gracie Jiu-Jitsu is a mixed martial arts and Brazilian jiu-jitsu gym based in Pleasant Hill, California. The gym features professional fighters who have competed in many major promotions, such as the Ultimate Fighting Championship (UFC), PRIDE Fighting Championships, DREAM, and Strikeforce.

== History ==
The academy was opened by Cesar Gracie. It rose to prominence in the late 2000s based on the success of a close-knit group of Gracie students known as the "Skrap Pack": Jake Shields, Gilbert Melendez, and brothers Nick and Nate Diaz. All fought primarily in the Strikeforce promotion at that time and were some of its most popular stars.

Prior to Jake Shields' UFC signing in 2010, Cesar Gracie Jiu-Jitsu housed champions in three of five weight classes in the Strikeforce promotion. This success helped Cesar Gracie secure a position among the nominees for "Coach of the Year" at the Fighters Only 2010 World MMA Awards.

On April 17, 2010, members of the Cesar Gracie Jiu Jitsu camp were involved in a brawl following the main event at Strikeforce: Nashville in Nashville, Tennessee. The incident began as Jason Miller, a former opponent of Jake Shields, interrupted Shields' post-fight interview following his decision victory over Dan Henderson. Shields, Nick Diaz, Nate Diaz, and Gilbert Melendez scuffled with Miller after he asked Shields for a rematch. In response to the brawl, the Tennessee Athletic Commission recommended a range of fines and suspensions for the fighters involved.

== Notable fighters ==
- (United States) Bret Bergmark - Strikeforce welterweight fighter
- (United States) Cody McKenzie - The Ultimate Fighter Season 12 contestant.
- (United States) Leslie Smith - Invicta FC Bantamweight Fighter
- (United States) Gil Castillo - UFC veteran, welterweight fighter
- (United States) Nate Diaz - UFC lightweight and welterweight fighter and The Ultimate Fighter Season 5 winner
- (United States) Nick Diaz - UFC welterweight fighter and former Strikeforce and WEC champion.
- (United States) David Douglas - Strikeforce lightweight fighter
- (United States) Gilbert Melendez - Strikeforce lightweight champion
- (United States) Dave Bautista - WWE professional wrestler, actor, MMA fighter, and brown belt under Cesar Gracie
- (United States) Daniel Roberts - UFC welterweight
- (United States) Yancy Medeiros - UFC welterweight fighter
- (United States) Jake Shields - WSOF Strikeforce middleweight champion and Elite XC welterweight champion, third place finisher in the under 77KG division at the 2005 ADCC Submission Wrestling World Championship
- (United States) Joe Schilling - Glory Middleweight kickboxer, Bellator Middleweight fighter
- (United States) David Terrell - UFC veteran, middleweight fighter, third place finisher in the under 88KG division at the 2003 ADCC Submission Wrestling World Championship

== See also ==
- List of professional MMA training camps
