= UFC 56 =

UFC mixed martial arts event in 2005

UFC 56: Full Force
- The poster for UFC 56: Full Force
- Promotion: Ultimate Fighting Championship
- Date: November 19, 2005
- Venue: MGM Grand Arena
- City: Las Vegas, Nevada
- Attendance: 12,000 (Paid: 9,995)
- Total gate: $1,986,000
- Buyrate: 200,000

Event chronology
The Ultimate Fighter: Team Hughes vs. Team Franklin Finale	UFC 56: Full Force	Ultimate Fight Night 3

UFC 56: Full Force was a mixed martial arts event held by the Ultimate Fighting Championship on November 19, 2005. It was held at the MGM Grand Arena in Las Vegas, Nevada, broadcast live on pay-per-view in the United States, and later released on DVD.

== Background ==
Headlining the card were the two coaches from The Ultimate Fighter 2, Rich Franklin and Matt Hughes, scheduled to defend their middleweight and welterweight titles, respectively. This event marked the first time that an Ultimate Fighter contestant, season one's Nate Quarry, would compete for a UFC championship. Two highlight reel knockouts including the devastating knockout of Nate Quarry were performed during UFC 56.

UFC 56 drew a live gate of $1,986,600, with 9,995 tickets sold. The total fighter payroll for the event was $294,000.

== Results ==
Main Card
Weight class				Method	Round	Time	Notes
Middleweight	Rich Franklin (c)	def.	Nate Quarry	KO (punch)	1	2:34	(Note: For the UFC Middleweight Championship.)
Heavyweight	Gabriel Gonzaga	def.	Kevin Jordan	KO (superman punch)	3	4:39
Catchweight	Matt Hughes (c)	def.	Joe Riggs	Submission (kimura)	1	3:28	(Note: Riggs was brought in as a replacement for Karo Parisyan, who suffered an injury in his training leading up to the bout. Although originally scheduled as a championship match, Riggs could not make the required weight at 170 lb and the bout was changed to a non-title welterweight match.)
Welterweight	Georges St-Pierre	def.	Sean Sherk	TKO (punches and elbows)	2	2:53
Middleweight	Jeremy Horn	def.	Trevor Prangley	Decision (unanimous) (29–28, 29–28, 29–28)	3	5:00
Preliminary card
Light Heavyweight	Sam Hoger	def.	Jeff Newton	Submission (rear-naked choke)	2	2:05	(Note: The bout, although preliminary, was aired on the broadcast.)
Welterweight	Thiago Alves	def.	Ansar Chalangov	TKO (punches)	1	2:25	(Note: The bout, although preliminary, was aired on the broadcast.)
Welterweight	Nick Thompson	def.	Keith Wisniewski	Decision (unanimous) (30–27, 30–27, 30–27)	3	5:00

== Fighter Payouts ==
Matt Hughes: $110,000 ($55,000 to fight; $55,000 to win)

Jeremy Horn: $50,000 ($25,000 to fight; $25,000 to win)

Georges St-Pierre: $35,000 ($16,000 to fight; $19,000 to win)

Rich Franklin: $26,000 ($13,000 to fight; $13,000 to win)

Joe Riggs: $12,000 (Note that Riggs was fined 10% of this amount for failing to make weight)

Nate Quarry: $10,000

Sean Sherk: $10,000

Sam Hoger: $10,000 ($5,000 to fight; $5,000 to win)

Trevor Prangley: $6,000

Gabriel Gonzaga: $6,000 ($3,000 to fight; $3,000 to win)

Nick Thompson: $6,000 ($3,000 to fight; $3,000 to win)

Thiago Alves: $4,000 ($2,000 to fight; $2,000 to win)

Kevin Jordan: $3,000

Jeff Newton: $2,000

Ansar Chalangov: $2,000

Keith Wisniewski: $2,000

Total Fighter Payouts: $294,000 (average of $18,375 per fighter)

== Encyclopedia awards ==
The following fighters were honored in the October 2011 book titled UFC Encyclopedia.

- Fight of the Night: Rich Franklin vs. Nate Quarry
- Knockout of the Night: Rich Franklin
- Submission of the Night: Matt Hughes

== See also ==
- Ultimate Fighting Championship
- List of UFC champions
- List of UFC events
- 2005 in UFC

== Sources ==
- UFC 56: Full Force Results on Sherdog.com
- "Ultimate Fighting Championship Cards" on Wrestling Information Archives
- "Riggs's Failed Weigh-In Makes UFC History" by Josh Gross, Sherdog, 19 Nov. 2005, retrieved July 3, 2006
- UFC 56 Fighter Salaries
