= Mike Swick =

American mixed martial arts fighter

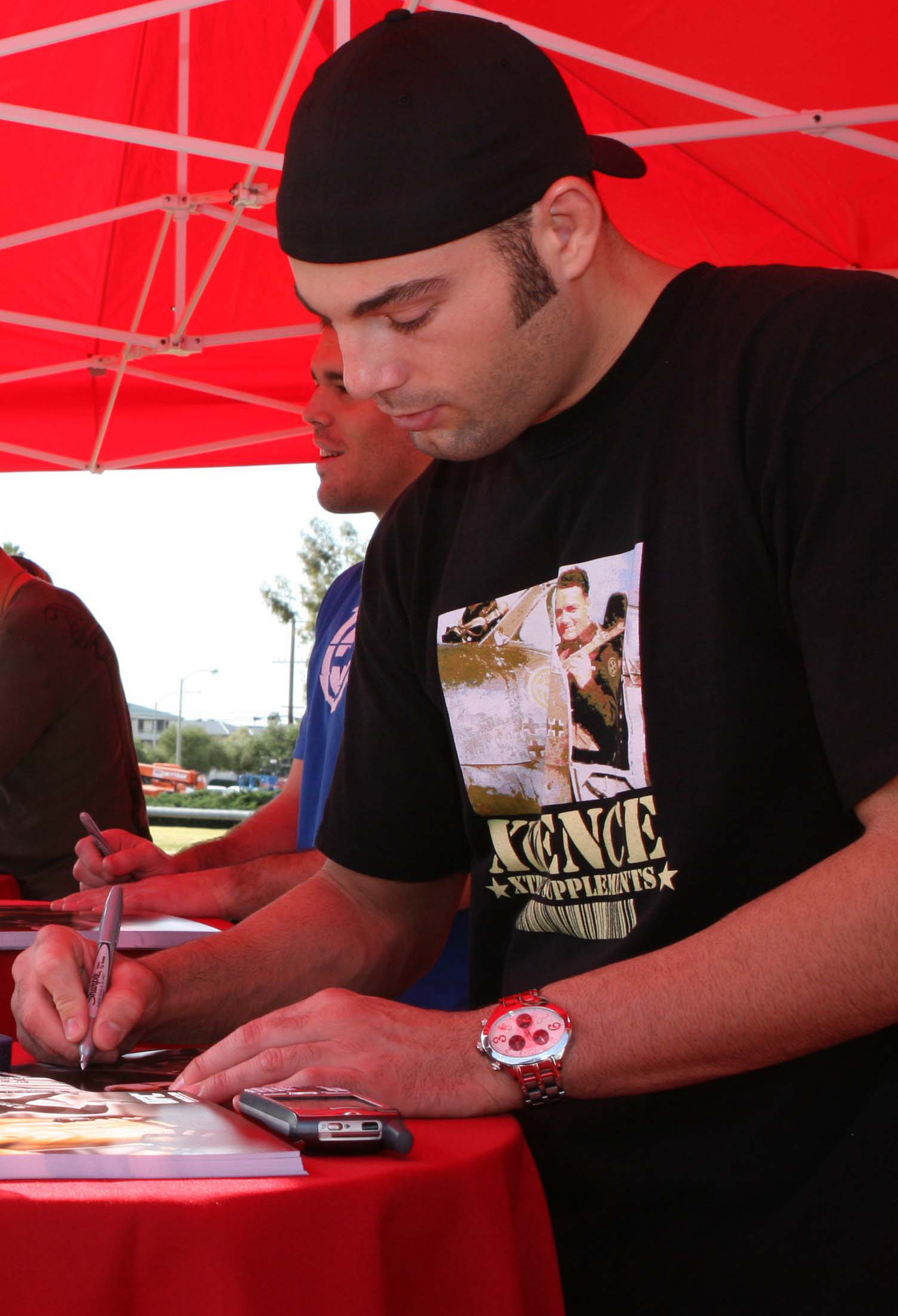
- Mike Swick signing autographs in 2008
- Born: June 19, 1979 (age 47); Houston, Texas, U.S.
- Nickname: Quick; Kid Lion
- Height: 6 ft 1 in (1.85 m)
- Weight: 170 lb (77 kg; 12 st)
- Division: Middleweight (185 lb); Welterweight (170 lb); Light Heavyweight (205 lb)
- Reach: 77 in (196 cm)
- Fighting out of: San Jose, California, United States
- Team: AKA Thailand
- Rank: Purple belt in Brazilian Jiu-Jitsu under Dave Camarillo
- Years active: 1998–2010, 2012, 2015 (MMA)

Mixed martial arts record
- Total: 21
- Wins: 15
- By knockout: 8
- By submission: 3
- By decision: 4
- Losses: 6
- By knockout: 2
- By submission: 1
- By decision: 3

Other information
- Website: mikeswick.com
- Mixed martial arts record from Sherdog

Mike Swick (born June 19, 1979) is an American retired professional mixed martial artist, who spent most of his career competing for the UFC's middleweight division and appeared on the inaugural season of The Ultimate Fighter. Swick founded AKA Thailand in Phuket, Thailand.

== Background ==
Swick was born in Houston, Texas, on June 19, 1979. Swick attended Katy High School. Aspiring to become a Navy Seal and inspired by The Karate Kid, Swick started training taekwondo in his youth as his first combat sport. He then participated in amateur fights in Texas before sanctioning was formed.

== Mixed martial arts career ==
=== Early career ===
Swick began his professional career in smaller shows, including early events of World Extreme Cagefighting (WEC). He amassed a record of 5–0 before challenging Chris Leben for the WEC Middleweight Championship. He lost the fight by knockout at 45 seconds of the second round.

=== The Ultimate Fighter ===
After his first professional loss, Swick entered the first season of The Ultimate Fighter, a reality television series produced by the UFC. Swick participated as a light heavyweight on Randy Couture's team. Chris Leben also participated as Swick's teammate. Leben insisted on talking about his victory over Swick, which irritated him. Swick's first fight in the show came during the semi-finals. He faced Stephan Bonnar, but was defeated by triangle armbar at 4:55 of the first round, eliminating him from the show.

=== Ultimate Fighting Championship ===
At UFC Ultimate Fight Night, Swick defeated Gideon Ray by KO just 22 seconds into the first round, earning the nickname "Quick" from UFC announcer Mike Goldberg.

Swick lived up to his nickname with several quick stoppages in his subsequent fights. He followed up with two first-round guillotine choke submissions over Steve Vigneault and Joe Riggs at UFC 58 and UFC 60, respectively. Swick jokingly called the move his "Swick-otine". At UFC 63, Swick faced former title challenger David Loiseau and earned a unanimous decision victory. He suffered ligament damage to his hand during the fight.

Swick's first UFC defeat came at UFC 69, losing by unanimous decision to Japanese middleweight Yushin Okami. He had Okami noticeably rattled toward the end of the second round with a flurry of punches, but ultimately succumbed to Okami's superior wrestling and physical presence, as he was taken down comfortably and suffered an onslaught of ground and pound for the majority of the fight. Chris Leben was then asked to fight a rematch with Swick at UFC Fight Night 11, but Leben turned down the fight, later claiming that his management turned down the fight without his knowledge. Swick was then scheduled to fight Jonathan Goulet, but withdrew from the fight due to a rib injury.

=== Drop to welterweight ===
Swick dropped down to welterweight and headlined UFC Fight Night 12 against Josh Burkman, winning by majority decision. Swick next appeared at UFC 85 against Marcus Davis, who was riding a six-fight win streak in the UFC coming into the bout. Swick controlled the fight with disciplined striking skills en route to a unanimous decision victory. He next faced Jonathan Goulet at UFC: Fight for the Troops. Swick opened up with a characteristically aggressive flurry of punches, knocking Goulet out on his feet. Swick rushed in with ground strikes before the referee stopped the fight.

Swick next faced Ben Saunders at UFC 99. After he reversed Saunders' takedown attempt with a quick sprawl and takedown of his own, Saunders held Swick in his guard for several minutes, stifling any offense and prompting Swick to taunt him for stalling. In the second round Swick's hands loosened up and he dropped Saunders with a clean straight right after landing a few punches, following up with a quick flurry to round off an impressive performance. This fight earned him a $60,000 Knockout of the Night award. In the post fight interview, Swick pointed out his record of 9–1 in the UFC and announced his interest in a title shot.

Swick was scheduled to fight Martin Kampmann on September 19, 2009 at UFC 103. The winner was set to receive a title shot against Georges St-Pierre. However, this changed when it was announced on September 4 that Swick had suffered an injury while training and would be unable to fight Kampmann at UFC 103. Paul Daley, who made his UFC debut on the undercard, stepped up as Swick's replacement and defeated Kampmann via TKO.

Swick replaced an injured Dong Hyun Kim and faced Dan Hardy on November 14, 2009 at UFC 105. The winner was to get the next shot at Georges St-Pierre's welterweight championship. In an interview prior to the event, Swick revealed he was pleased to have dropped back to Welterweight but admitted he could not focus on Georges St-Pierre until after his fight with Hardy. Swick was rocked by a straight right hand from Hardy early in the first round and rocked again in the second and third rounds. He went on to lose the fight by unanimous decision.

At UFC 109, on February 6, 2010, Swick lost to Paulo Thiago via technical submission by a d'arce choke, after taking a counter left in an exchange in the second round. Swick refused to tap to the choke, rendering him unconscious.

In early September, Swick stated that he had been mis-diagnosed with a stomach disease. The disease which he was incorrectly told he had, forced him onto a very bland and restrictive diet, which made it virtually impossible for Swick to put and keep on any muscle mass.

Swick was expected to return to action against David Mitchell on January 22, 2011 at UFC Fight Night 23. Although it was thought he might return to action at middleweight, Swick and David Mitchell verbally agreed to a January 22 fight in the welterweight division. However, Mitchell was forced out of the fight with a back injury and Swick felt as if his stomach condition was not completely healed, so the bout was scrapped from the card altogether.

Swick was expected to face promotional newcomer Erick Silva on August 27, 2011 at UFC 134. However, on August 4, 2011, it was announced that Swick had to withdraw from the bout due to a knee injury.

Swick faced DaMarques Johnson on August 4, 2012 at UFC on FOX 4. He defeated Johnson via KO at 1:20 into the second round. The finish came when Swick caught a leg kick, tripped Johnson to the ground, and landed a diving punch that immediately knocked Johnson out. The performance earned Swick Knockout of the Night honors.

On August 28, 2012, it was announced that Swick has signed a new four fight contract with the UFC.

In the second match since his return, Swick faced Matt Brown on December 8, 2012 at UFC on Fox 5. Swick lost the fight, after being knocked out in the second round.

Swick spent all of 2013 in Phuket Thailand, building his dream gym, AKA Thailand. The gym, one of the biggest in the world, hosts Thailand's largest indoor matted MMA/BJJ training facility.

After two-and-a-half years away from active fighting, Swick returned from hiatus and faced Alex Garcia on July 11, 2015 at UFC 189. He lost the fight by unanimous decision. On July 16, 2015, Swick posted on his Facebook page that he was officially retiring from active MMA competition to focus on running his gym AKA Thailand.

== Championships and accomplishments ==
- Ultimate Fighting Championship
  - Knockout of the Night (Two times) vs. Ben Saunders and DaMarques Johnson
  - UFC Encyclopedia Awards
    - Knockout of the Night (One time) vs. Gideon Ray
    - Submission of the Night (One time) vs. Joe Riggs
  - UFC.com Awards
    - 2005: Ranked #9 Knockout of the Year vs. Gideon Ray

== Personal life ==
Swick got married in 2008. Now retired from professional fighting, Swick currently owns and runs his own gym in Phuket, Thailand, known as AKA Thailand, which is linked to the main American Kickboxing Academy headquarters in San Jose, California.

On February 16, 2022 Swick announced he was diagnosed with cancer, and subsequently announced he was cancer-free in 2023.

== Television and film ==
Swick was featured in Fight Life, an award-winning documentary on the sport of MMA, which was released in 2013.

== Mixed martial arts record ==
Professional record breakdown
21 matches	15 wins	6 losses
By knockout	8	2
By submission	3	1
By decision	4	3

Res.	Record	Opponent	Method	Event	Date	Round	Time	Location	Notes
Loss	15–6	Alex Garcia	Decision (unanimous)	UFC 189	July 11, 2015	3	5:00	Las Vegas, Nevada, United States	
Loss	15–5	Matt Brown	KO (punches)	UFC on Fox: Henderson vs. Diaz	December 8, 2012	2	2:31	Seattle, Washington, United States	
Win	15–4	DaMarques Johnson	KO (punch)	UFC on Fox: Shogun vs. Vera	August 4, 2012	2	1:20	Los Angeles, California, United States	Knockout of the Night.
Loss	14–4	Paulo Thiago	Technical Submission (D'Arce choke)	UFC 109	February 6, 2010	2	1:54	Las Vegas, Nevada, United States	
Loss	14–3	Dan Hardy	Decision (unanimous)	UFC 105	November 14, 2009	3	5:00	Manchester, England	UFC Welterweight title eliminator.
Win	14–2	Ben Saunders	TKO (punches)	UFC 99	June 13, 2009	2	3:47	Cologne, Germany	Knockout of the Night.
Win	13–2	Jonathan Goulet	KO (punches)	UFC: Fight for the Troops	December 10, 2008	1	0:33	Fayetteville, North Carolina, United States	
Win	12–2	Marcus Davis	Decision (unanimous)	UFC 85	June 7, 2008	3	5:00	London, England	
Win	11–2	Josh Burkman	Decision (majority)	UFC Fight Night: Swick vs. Burkman	January 23, 2008	3	5:00	Las Vegas, Nevada, United States	Welterweight debut.
Loss	10–2	Yushin Okami	Decision (unanimous)	UFC 69	April 7, 2007	3	5:00	Houston, Texas, United States	
Win	10–1	David Loiseau	Decision (unanimous)	UFC 63	September 23, 2006	3	5:00	Anaheim, California, United States	
Win	9–1	Joe Riggs	Submission (guillotine choke)	UFC 60	May 27, 2006	1	2:19	Los Angeles, California, United States	
Win	8–1	Steve Vigneault	Submission (guillotine choke)	UFC 58	March 4, 2006	1	2:09	Las Vegas, Nevada, United States	
Win	7–1	Gideon Ray	TKO (punches)	UFC Ultimate Fight Night	August 6, 2005	1	0:22	Las Vegas, Nevada, United States	
Win	6–1	Alex Schoenauer	KO (punch)	The Ultimate Fighter 1 Finale	April 9, 2005	1	0:20	Las Vegas, Nevada, United States	
Loss	5–1	Chris Leben	KO (punch)	WEC 9	January 16, 2004	2	0:45	Lemoore, California, United States	For the inaugural WEC Middleweight Championship.
Win	5–0	Butch Bacon	KO (punches)	SB 1 – Shootbox 1	August 23, 2003	1	0:26	Orlando, Florida, United States	
Win	4–0	Kengo Ura	KO (knee)	WEC 6	March 27, 2003	3	0:31	Lemoore, California, United States	
Win	3–0	James Gabert	Decision (unanimous)	WEC 4	August 31, 2002	3	5:00	Uncasville, Connecticut, United States	
Win	2–0	James Whitifield	TKO (punches)	NSFC – NW Submission Fighting 1	May 4, 2002	1	1:15	Boise, Idaho, United States	
Win	1–0	Victor Bell	Submission (rear-naked choke)	PRW – Power Ring Warriors	November 7, 1998	1	2:10	Humble, Texas, United States	

=== Mixed martial arts exhibition record ===
Exhibition record breakdown		
1 match	0 wins	1 loss
By submission	0	1

Res.	Record	Opponent	Method	Event	Date	Round	Time	Location	Notes
Loss	0–1	Stephan Bonnar	Submission (triangle armbar)	The Ultimate Fighter 1	April 4, 2005	1	4:55	Las Vegas, Nevada, United States	Preliminary bout

== See also ==
- List of current UFC fighters
- List of male mixed martial artists
