= UFC 50 =

UFC mixed martial arts event in 2004

UFC 50: The War of '04
- The poster for UFC 50: The War of '04
- Promotion: Ultimate Fighting Championship
- Date: October 22, 2004
- Venue: Trump Plaza
- City: Atlantic City, New Jersey
- Attendance: 9,000
- Buyrate: 40,000

Event chronology
UFC 49: Unfinished Business	UFC 50: The War of '04	UFC 51: Super Saturday

UFC 50: The War of '04 was a mixed martial arts event held by the Ultimate Fighting Championship on October 22, 2004, at the Trump Plaza in Atlantic City, New Jersey. The event was broadcast live on pay-per-view in the United States, and later released on DVD.

== History ==
Headlining the card were Tito Ortiz and Patrick Côté. Côté was a late replacement for Lion's Den fighter Guy Mezger, who pulled out of the event after being taken to the hospital due to stroke-like symptoms. Patrick Côté was moved from the undercard to the main event.

The event included another episode of "On The Mat", teaching the Kimura. This event was also featured on the first season of The Ultimate Fighter.

This event became notable due to the announcement of the reality-based series The Ultimate Fighter by Dana White, which premiered in January the following year.

== Results ==
Main Card
Weight class				Method	Round	Time	Notes
Light Heavyweight	Tito Ortiz	def.	Patrick Côté	Decision (unanimous) (30–27, 30–26, 30–26)	3	5:00
Middleweight	Rich Franklin	def.	Jorge Rivera	Submission (armbar)	3	4:28
Welterweight	Matt Hughes	def.	Georges St-Pierre	Submission (armbar)	1	4:59	(Note: For the vacant UFC Welterweight Championship.)
Welterweight	Frank Trigg	def.	Renato Verissimo	TKO (elbows)	2	2:11
Middleweight	Evan Tanner	def.	Robbie Lawler	Submission (triangle choke)	1	2:22
Preliminary card
Middleweight	Ivan Salaverry	def.	Tony Fryklund	Submission (body triangle)	1	1:36
Light Heavyweight	Travis Lutter	def.	Marvin Eastman	KO (punch)	2	0:43	(Note: Lutter was a replacement for Patrick Côté, who filled in for Guy Mezger in the main event.)

== Encyclopedia awards ==
The following fighters were honored in the October 2011 book titled UFC Encyclopedia.

- Fight of the Night: Frank Trigg vs. Renato Verissimo
- Knockout of the Night: Travis Lutter
- Submission of the Night: Matt Hughes

== See also ==
- Ultimate Fighting Championship
- List of UFC champions
- List of UFC events
- 2004 in UFC
