= Charles McCarthy (fighter) =

American mixed martial arts fighter

- Born: August 6, 1980 (age 46); Mount Kisco, NY, U.S.
- Other names: Chainsaw
- Height: 6 ft 0 in (1.83 m)
- Weight: 185 lb (84 kg; 13.2 st)
- Division: Middleweight
- Fighting out of: Boynton Beach, Florida
- Team: Previously of American Top Team, Currently American Combat Gym
- Rank: Black belt in Brazilian Jiu-Jitsu FFA brown belt under Marcos Avellan
- Years active: 2003–2008

Mixed martial arts record
- Total: 15
- Wins: 10
- By submission: 10
- Losses: 5
- By knockout: 2
- By submission: 2
- By decision: 1

Other information
- Mixed martial arts record from Sherdog

Charles Sidney McCarthy (born August 6, 1980) is a retired American mixed martial artist. A professional competitor from 2003 until 2008, he competed for the UFC, King of the Cage, and was a competitor on The Ultimate Fighter 4.

== Mixed martial arts career ==
His official UFC record is 1–2, having lost his debut to David Loiseau by TKO due to a spinning back kick at UFC 53 while defeating Gideon Ray by an armbar on The Ultimate Fighter 4 Finale, giving him his first UFC victory. McCarthy was eliminated by Pete Sell from The Ultimate Fighter 4. However, as the fight was a demonstration bout by Nevada State Athletic Commission standards, it did not count toward McCarthy's official record. McCarthy's last fight was a loss against Michael Bisping by TKO at UFC 83. McCarthy repeatedly taunted Bisping during the bout. McCarthy, however, was subsequently unable to answer the bell for the second round due to injury after a flurry of knees from Bisping at the end of round one.

McCarthy announced his retirement from mixed martial arts on April 24, 2008.

== Personal life ==
Charles and his now ex-wife Elisa were married in September 2005, right before the filming started on The Ultimate Fighter 4. The couple have two sons.

== Championships and accomplishments ==
- Ultimate Fighting Championship
  - UFC.com Awards
    - 2005: Ranked #8 Fight of the Year vs. David Loiseau

== Mixed martial arts record ==
Professional record breakdown
15 matches	10 wins	5 losses
By knockout	0	2
By submission	10	2
By decision	0	1

Res.	Record	Opponent	Method	Event	Date	Round	Time	Location	Notes
Loss	10–5	Michael Bisping	TKO (arm injury)	UFC 83	April 19, 2008	1	5:00	Montreal, Quebec, Canada	
Win	10–4	Gideon Ray	Submission (armbar)	The Ultimate Fighter: The Comeback Finale	November 11, 2006	1	4:43	Las Vegas, Nevada, United States	
Loss	9–4	Trevor Garrett	Submission (guillotine choke)	Full Throttle 4	September 9, 2005	1	0:39	Duluth, Georgia, United States	
Win	9–3	Mike Van Meer	Submission (armbar)	Full Throttle 3	July 15, 2005	2	4:09	Georgia, United States	
Loss	8–3	David Loiseau	TKO (spinning back kick)	UFC 53	June 4, 2005	2	2:10	Atlantic City, New Jersey, United States	
Win	8–2	Timothy Williams	Submission (armbar)	Full Throttle 1	April 21, 2005	1	2:33	Georgia, United States	
Win	7–2	Sean Sallee	Submission (armbar)	Absolute Fighting Championships 11	February 12, 2005	1	3:03	Fort Lauderdale, Florida, United States	
Win	6–2	Keith Rockel	Submission (armbar)	Absolute Fighting Championships 10	October 30, 2004	2	2:16	Fort Lauderdale, Florida, United States	
Win	5–2	Pat O'Malley	Submission (rear naked choke)	Absolute Fighting Championships 9	July 31, 2004	1	2:02	Fort Lauderdale, Florida, United States	
Win	4–2	Jeff Fenno	Submission (rear naked choke)	ISCF: Throwdown in V-Town	March 6, 2004	N/A	N/A	Valdosta, Georgia, United States	
Loss	3–2	David Bielkheden	TKO (submission to punches)	Absolute Fighting Championships 7	February 27, 2004	1	3:33	Fort Lauderdale, Florida, United States	
Loss	3–1	Marcel Ferriera	Decision (majority)	KOTC 32: Bringing Heat	January 24, 2004	2	5:00	Miami, Florida, United States	
Win	3–0	Pat O'Malley	Submission (heel hook)	Absolute Fighting Championships 6	December 6, 2003	1	0:28	Fort Lauderdale, Florida, United States	
Win	2–0	Wesley Bockert	Submission (kimura)	ISCF: Total Velocity in the Valley	November 8, 2003	1	0:31	N/A	
Win	1–0	Jay Massey	Submission (kimura)	Absolute Fighting Championships 4	July 19, 2003	2	2:05	Fort Lauderdale, Florida, United States	
