= David Terrell (fighter) =

American mixed martial arts fighter

- Born: David Michael Terrell; January 9, 1978 (age 48); Sacramento, California, U.S.
- Other names: The Soul Assassin
- Height: 6 ft 0 in (1.83 m)
- Weight: 185 lb (84 kg; 13.2 st)
- Division: Middleweight
- Reach: 75 in (190 cm)
- Fighting out of: Santa Rosa, California, U.S.
- Team: Cesar Gracie Jiu-Jitsu, NorCal Fighting Alliance
- Rank: Black belt in Brazilian Jiu-Jitsu under Cesar Gracie
- Years active: 1999–2006

Mixed martial arts record
- Total: 8
- Wins: 6
- By knockout: 2
- By submission: 4
- Losses: 2
- By knockout: 1
- By decision: 1

Other information
- Notable students: Joe Soto
- Mixed martial arts record from Sherdog

David Terrell
Medal record

Representing United States

Submission Wrestling

ADCC World Championship
Bronze medal – third place	2003 Sao Paulo	-88kg

David Michael Terrell (born January 9, 1978) is a retired American professional mixed martial artist who competed in the UFC and Pancrase.

== Background ==
Terrell is from Sacramento, California and was introduced to combat sports through Wrestling, and was an accomplished wrestler in high school. He officially began training in Sambo at 16, and Brazilian Jiu-Jitsu when he was 19 years old, being interested in the martial arts after watching several UFC fights on television.

== Mixed martial arts career ==
=== UFC career ===
In his UFC debut, he scored a stunning knockout victory over top Middleweight Matt Lindland. The victory instantly thrust Terrell into title contention, as his next fight was against Evan Tanner for the vacant UFC Middleweight Championship title in February 2005. Despite locking Tanner in a tight guillotine choke, Terrell lost the hold and eventually lost the match by technical knockout in the first round.

Plagued by recurring injuries, Terrell's next fight did not come until UFC 59 in April 2006, where Terrell submitted his opponent, Scott Smith, with a rear naked choke in the first round. Controversy surrounds the victory as the referee told the fighters to break before Terrell took Smith down. Smith was appealing to the referee when Terrell was able to get Smith's back and apply a rear naked choke. Questionable officiating by referee Marco Lopez led Smith to file a complaint to the California State Athletic Commission. At UFC 62 he was supposed to fight Yushin Okami but withdrew the bout due to a sinus infection. The fight with Okami was then rescheduled to UFC 66, but Terrell again pulled out of the fight citing an elbow injury suffered during training.

Despite an early report which claimed that Terrell was planning to move to Light Heavyweight, Terrell was scheduled to fight Ed Herman in a Middleweight contest at UFC 78 in November 2007. However, he withdrew from the bout due to injury and was replaced by Joe Doerksen.

On February 21, 2008 Terrell was released by the UFC.

=== Post-UFC ===
In early 2010 Terrell expressed his desire to continue fighting.

== Career accomplishments ==
=== Mixed martial arts ===
- Ultimate Fighting Championship
  - UFC Encyclopedia Awards
    - Knockout of the Night (One time) vs. Matt Lindland

== Mixed martial arts record ==
Professional record breakdown
8 matches	6 wins	2 losses
By knockout	2	1
By submission	4	0
By decision	0	1

Res.	Record	Opponent	Method	Event	Date	Round	Time	Location	Notes
Win	6–2	Scott Smith	Submission (rear-naked choke)	UFC 59	April 15, 2006	1	3:08	Anaheim, California, United States	
Loss	5–2	Evan Tanner	TKO (punches)	UFC 51	February 5, 2005	1	4:35	Las Vegas, Nevada, United States	For the vacant UFC Middleweight Championship.
Win	5–1	Matt Lindland	KO (punches)	UFC 49	August 21, 2004	1	0:24	Las Vegas, Nevada, United States	
Win	4–1	Osami Shibuya	Submission (choke)	Pancrase: Brave 3	March 24, 2004	1	3:04	Tokyo, Japan	
Win	3–1	Yuki Sasaki	KO (punch)	Pancrase: Hybrid 11	December 21, 2003	2	0:15	Tokyo, Japan	
Win	2–1	Marcos da Silva	Submission (exhaustion)	IFC WC 11: Warriors Challenge 11	January 13, 2001	1	7:02	Fresno, California, United States	
Win	1–1	Joey Villaseñor	Submission (armbar)	IFC WC 9: Warriors Challenge 9	July 18, 2000	1	2:24	Friant, California, United States	
Loss	0–1	Vernon White	Decision (unanimous)	IFC WC 4: Warriors Challenge 4	August 17, 1999	3	5:00	Jackson, California, United States	

== See also ==
- List of male mixed martial artists
