= Nate Quarry =

American mixed martial artist

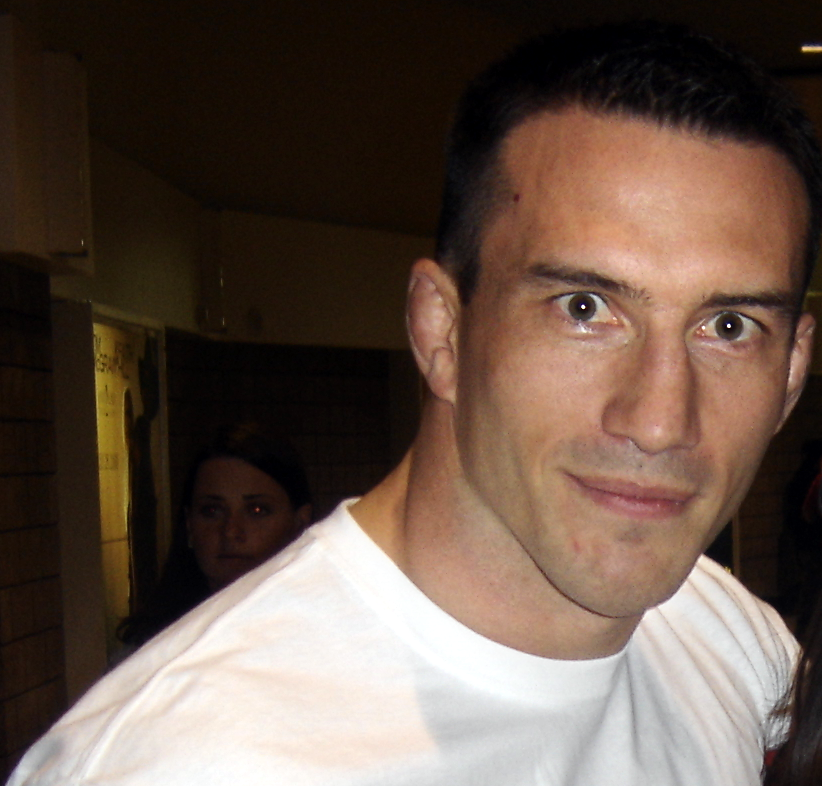
- Born: March 19, 1972 (age 54); Arcata, California, U.S.
- Other names: Rock
- Height: 6 ft 0 in (1.83 m)
- Weight: 185 lb (84 kg; 13.2 st)
- Division: Middleweight
- Reach: 72 1/2 in (184 cm)
- Style: Muay Thai, Brazilian Jiu Jitsu
- Stance: Orthodox
- Team: Straight Blast Gym (until 1999); Team Quest (1999–2006); Next Level MMA (2008–2010)
- Rank: Brown belt in Brazilian jiu-jitsu
- Years active: 2001–2010

Mixed martial arts record
- Total: 16
- Wins: 12
- By knockout: 7
- By submission: 2
- By decision: 3
- Losses: 4
- By knockout: 2
- By submission: 1
- By decision: 1

Other information
- Mixed martial arts record from Sherdog

Nate Quarry (born March 19, 1972) is an American retired mixed martial arts fighter who is most notable for his appearance in The Ultimate Fighter, a reality show from the Ultimate Fighting Championship, as well as co-hosting the show MMA Uncensored Live.

== Early life and education ==
Quarry grew up as a member of the Jehovah's Witnesses, which he later characterized as a cult which controls its members 24 hours a day. He grew up with two sisters and a brother in an abusive, violent household. He attended North Salem High School. He grew up in a sheltered lifestyle and did not even participate in organized sports until age 24, when he first became exposed to mixed martial arts. After a period of self-discovery, Quarry rejected his Jehovah's Witness upbringing, began to associate with others outside of the church and along the way began to train in mixed martial arts fighting in secrecy. After getting caught playing sports and dating a girl, Quarry was excommunicated from the church and his family. Eventually, Quarry made his way to Team Quest, out of Gresham, Oregon, where he continued to train until 2006.

== Mixed martial arts career ==
Quarry made his professional mixed martial arts debut in 2001, in a match against Drew McFedries, which he won with a TKO in the second round. After compiling a 5–1 record, Quarry was invited by the UFC to participate in The Ultimate Fighter, a reality television show and mixed martial arts competition featuring up-and-coming MMA talent living and training in seclusion with the UFC. On the show however, Quarry had to drop out of the competition when he suffered an ankle injury during practice, which would have required six weeks to heal. He was asked to stay on as an assistant coach. When he was no longer officially allowed to compete, he allowed Team Quest teammate, Chris Leben (who was already eliminated by Josh Koscheck) to take his place. During his time on the show, he was seen as the role model for Team Couture and would also stand up for Team Liddell member Sam Hoger when others would make fun of him, but confronted him when he was accused of stealing UFC merchandise from the gym.

Quarry made his UFC debut on The Ultimate Fighter finale card, where he defeated Lodune Sincaid by TKO. He won his first two fights in the UFC, both first round stoppages, including a victory over Shonie Carter, and was granted a shot at the middleweight title at UFC 56 on November 19, 2005. Quarry became the first Ultimate Fighter contestant to ever receive a UFC title shot. Middleweight Champion, Rich Franklin won the fight via one punch knockout in the first round.

Up until his rematch with Pete Sell, Quarry had not fought since his knockout defeat against Franklin, due to numerous injuries suffered prior to his fight with Rich Franklin. After his fight with Franklin, Quarry underwent a successful surgical procedure in June 2006 to repair a chronic back injury due to his many years of hard training. In the news segment of his website, he reported that his back and nose had since healed and that he is back in training. On July 31, 2007, it was announced that Quarry would be making his return to the UFC on September 19, 2007 at UFC Fight Night 11, where he knocked out rival Pete Sell.

Quarry then defeated Kalib Starnes by decision at UFC 83. The fight was unusual because Starnes backed away from Quarry for almost the entire fight. In the final seconds of the fight, Quarry began showboating (which included the running-man) in protest to Starnes's refusal to engage. One judge scored the bout 30–24 in Quarry's favour, marking the second-largest margin of victory in UFC history.

At UFC 91, Quarry faced undefeated submission specialist Demian Maia. Maia controlled Nate on the ground and submitted him with a Rear Naked Choke in the first round. UFC 97 saw Nate take on Canadian fighter Jason MacDonald. Quarry over-powered Jason MacDonald by wrestling him to the ground and then delivering some brutal ground and pound bloodying him and ending the fight in the first round.

Nate then fought Tim Credeur, who was an Ultimate Fighter 7 contestant, at UFC Fight Night 19. Nate won the fight via unanimous decision. The bout received Fight of the Night honours. With this victory Quarry improved his UFC record to 7–2 and had won 4 of his last 5 bouts since his return to the UFC.

In his last UFC bout, Quarry faced fellow seasoned MMA veteran Jorge Rivera at UFC Fight Night 21. After getting knocked down multiple times, Quarry lost the fight via TKO in the second round. After the fight Quarry underwent facial reconstruction surgery.

Quarry has since retired from MMA.

After his retirement he became the co-host of MMA Uncensored Live on Spike TV.

On April 19, 2015, Quarry came out of retirement for an exhibition bout with 19-year-old Jacob "Jake" Beckmann at Rumble at the Roseland. Beckmann has Down syndrome and has been training martial arts for a number of years. He has long dreamed to compete in a MMA match and Quarry helped his wish come true. Quarry was "submitted" via leg lock in the second round. Beckmann was crowned 'world heavyweight champion' and adorned with a replica UFC title belt. The match also raised $1,000 for Create the Connection, an organization working to create meaningful employment opportunities for people in need.

== Personal life ==
Quarry has a daughter named Ciera, whom he raised mostly as a single parent. He also has a son (born 2019) with his current wife.

Quarry was featured in the video game Left 4 Dead 2 as a guest zombie.

Quarry created a comic book named Zombie Cage Fighter loosely based on his life.

Quarry is interviewed in the 2013 documentary Truth be Told, where he discusses his sheltered upbringing, and eventual expulsion, from the Jehovah's Witness faith.

On December 16, 2014, Quarry was listed as one of three MMA fighters who filed a class-action lawsuit against Zuffa, LLC., the parent company of the UFC. The suit alleges that the UFC participated in anti-competitive practices that hindered fighters and their mixed martial arts careers.

Quarry was featured in the A&E documentary series Leah Remini: Scientology and the Aftermath Season 3 Episode 1, "The Jehovah's Witnesses", airing on November 13, 2018.

== Championships and awards ==
- Ultimate Fighting Championship
  - Fight of the Night (One time) vs. Tim Credeur
  - UFC Encyclopedia Awards
    - Fight of the Night (One time) vs. Rich Franklin
  - UFC.com Awards
    - 2007: Ranked #8 Knockout of the Year & Ranked #6 Fight of the Year vs. Pete Sell
    - 2009: Ranked #3 Fight of the Year vs. Tim Credeur

== Mixed martial arts record ==
Professional record breakdown
16 matches	12 wins	4 losses
By knockout	7	2
By submission	2	1
By decision	3	1

Res.	Record	Opponent	Method	Event	Date	Round	Time	Location	Notes
Loss	12–4	Jorge Rivera	TKO (punches)	UFC Fight Night: Florian vs. Gomi	March 31, 2010	2	0:29	Charlotte, North Carolina, United States|	
Win	12–3	Tim Credeur	Decision (unanimous)	UFC Fight Night: Diaz vs. Guillard	September 16, 2009	3	5:00	Oklahoma City, Oklahoma, United States	Fight of the Night.
Win	11–3	Jason MacDonald	TKO (elbows)	UFC 97	April 18, 2009	1	2:27	Montreal, Quebec, Canada	
Loss	10–3	Demian Maia	Submission (rear-naked choke)	UFC 91	November 15, 2008	1	2:44	Las Vegas, Nevada, United States	
Win	10–2	Kalib Starnes	Decision (unanimous)	UFC 83	April 19, 2008	3	5:00	Montreal, Quebec, Canada	
Win	9–2	Pete Sell	KO (punch)	UFC Fight Night: Thomas vs. Florian	September 19, 2007	3	0:44	Las Vegas, Nevada, United States	
Loss	8–2	Rich Franklin	KO (punch)	UFC 56	November 19, 2005	1	2:34	Las Vegas, Nevada, United States	For the UFC Middleweight Championship.
Win	8–1	Pete Sell	TKO (punch)	UFC Ultimate Fight Night	August 6, 2005	1	0:42	Las Vegas, Nevada, United States	
Win	7–1	Shonie Carter	TKO (punches)	UFC 53	June 4, 2005	1	2:37	Atlantic City, New Jersey, United States	
Win	6–1	Lodune Sincaid	TKO (punches)	The Ultimate Fighter 1 Finale	April 9, 2005	1	3:17	Las Vegas, Nevada, United States	
Win	5–1	Chris Kiever	Submission (triangle choke)	IFC: Battleground Boise	October 25, 2003	1	4:33	Boise, Idaho, United States	
Loss	4–1	Gustavo Machado	Decision (unanimous)	KOTC 25: Flaming Fury	June 29, 2003	3	5:00	San Jacinto, California, United States	
Win	4–0	George Lopez	KO (punch)	Gladiator Challenge 14	February 17, 2003	1	1:02	Porterville, California, United States	
Win	3–0	Todd Carney	Submission (armbar)	Excalibur Fighting 13	December 7, 2002	N/A	N/A	Richmond, Virginia, United States	
Win	2–0	Nakapan Phungephorn	Decision (majority)	Excalibur Fighting 11	July 6, 2002	2	5:00	Richmond, Virginia, United States	
Win	1–0	Drew McFedries	TKO (exhaustion)	Extreme Challenge 43	September 8, 2001	2	3:03	Orem, Utah, United States	
