= UFC 51 =

UFC mixed martial arts event in 2005

UFC 51: Super Saturday
- The poster for UFC 51: Super Saturday
- Promotion: Ultimate Fighting Championship
- Date: February 5, 2005
- Venue: Mandalay Bay Events Center
- City: Paradise, Nevada
- Attendance: 11,072 (Paid: 9,268)
- Total gate: $1,493,000
- Buyrate: 105,000

Event chronology
UFC 50: The War of '04	UFC 51: Super Saturday	The Ultimate Fighter: Team Couture vs. Team Liddell Finale

UFC 51: Super Saturday was a mixed martial arts event held by the Ultimate Fighting Championship on February 5, 2005 (Super Bowl weekend) at the Mandalay Bay Events Center in the Las Vegas suburb of Paradise, Nevada. The event was broadcast live on pay-per-view in the United States and Canada, and later released on DVD.

== History ==
Loretta Hunt, news editor for Sherdog.com, reports, "I know for a fact the UFC was considering a female bout between Erica Montoya and the late Shelby Walker a few years ago." About this planned but never realized fight, "Big Dog" Benny Henderson Jr. asked Shelby Walker, "It has been rumored that you may fight Erika Montoya at UFC 51, is there any truth to those rumors?" Walker replied, "Yeah there is truth to those rumors, it has been talked about a lot and when I asked Dana White if he was going to put us on the show he said possibly, so that is where it stands right now. I haven't heard anything more from this but my biggest dream would be to fight in the UFC."

The event was also to be held in Japan, but UFC President Dana White moved it back to Las Vegas. Headlining the card were fan favorites Tito Ortiz and Vitor Belfort.

This was the last UFC event to feature a non-title matchup as the main event instead of an also-scheduled title fight on the same card until UFC 196.

== Results ==
Main Card
Weight class				Method	Round	Time	Notes
Light Heavyweight	Tito Ortiz	def.	Vitor Belfort	Decision (split) (29–28, 28–29, 29–28)	3	5:00
Middleweight	Pete Sell	def.	Phil Baroni	Submission (guillotine choke)	3	4:19
Heavyweight	Andrei Arlovski	def.	Tim Sylvia	Submission (achilles lock)	1	0:47	(Note: For the interim UFC Heavyweight Championship. The title was an interim championship due to the reigning UFC Heavyweight Champion Frank Mir being unable to defend his title after suffering serious injuries in a motorcycle accident.)
Middleweight	Evan Tanner	def.	David Terrell	TKO (punches)	1	4:35	(Note: For the vacant UFC Middleweight Championship.)
Heavyweight	Paul Buentello	def.	Justin Eilers	KO (punch)	1	3:34
Preliminary card
Heavyweight	Mike Kyle	def.	James Irvin	KO (punch)	1	1:55	(Note: Although preliminary, this bout aired on the pay-per-view broadcast.)
Middleweight	David Loiseau	def.	Gideon Ray	TKO (doctor stoppage)	1	5:00
Welterweight	Karo Parisyan	def.	Chris Lytle	Decision (unanimous) (30–27, 30–27, 30–27)	3	5:00
Welterweight	Nick Diaz	def.	Drew Fickett	TKO (punches)	1	4:40

== Encyclopedia awards ==
The following fighters were honored in the October 2011 book titled UFC Encyclopedia.

- Fight of the Night: Tito Ortiz vs. Vitor Belfort
- Knockout of the Night: Evan Tanner
- Submission of the Night: Andrei Arlovski

== See also ==
- Ultimate Fighting Championship
- List of UFC champions
- List of UFC events
- 2005 in UFC
