= Rich Franklin =

American mixed martial arts fighter

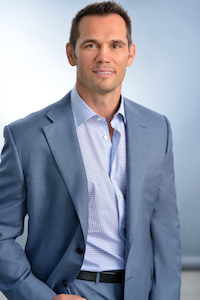
- Franklin in 2014
- Born: Richard Jay Franklin II; October 5, 1974 (age 52); Cincinnati, Ohio, U.S.
- Other names: Ace
- Height: 6 ft 1 in (1.85 m)
- Weight: 185 lb (84 kg; 13 st 3 lb)
- Division: Middleweight; Light heavyweight
- Reach: 76 in (190 cm)
- Stance: Southpaw
- Fighting out of: Cincinnati, Ohio, United States
- Team: Team Extreme/The JG MMA and Fitness Academy Evolve MMA
- Trainer: Matt Hume; Jorge Gurgel; Joel Jamieson; John Cross
- Rank: Black belt in Brazilian jiu-jitsu under Jorge Gurgel
- Years active: 1999–2015 (MMA)

Mixed martial arts record
- Total: 37
- Wins: 29
- By knockout: 20
- By submission: 5
- By decision: 4
- Losses: 7
- By knockout: 5
- By decision: 2
- No contests: 1

Amateur record
- Total: 2
- Wins: 1
- By submission: 1
- Losses: 1
- By knockout: 1

Other information
- University: University of Cincinnati
- Spouse: Beth Franklin (m. 2002; div. 2011)
- Notable school: William Henry Harrison High
- Website: www.richfranklin.com
- Mixed martial arts record from Sherdog
- Last updated on: September 16, 2011

Richard Jay Franklin II (born October 5, 1974) is an American businessman and retired mixed martial artist. He is best known for competing in the Ultimate Fighting Championship, where he is a member of the UFC Hall of Fame and a former UFC Middleweight Champion. Franklin has been the Vice President of Singaporean combat sports promotion ONE Championship since May 2014.

== Background ==
Franklin was born to Richard Sr. and Vaila Franklin. The couple divorced when Franklin was five years old. He has one biological brother, Greg, and five half-siblings.

Franklin graduated from William Henry Harrison High School in Harrison, Ohio. He earned a bachelor's degree in mathematics and later earned a master's degree in education at the University of Cincinnati. He taught mathematics at the Oak Hills High School in Cincinnati, Ohio before turning professional in MMA.

His nickname, "Ace," comes from his resemblance to the actor Jim Carrey, who played the character Ace Ventura. Joe Rogan once called Franklin "Angry Jim Carrey".

Franklin is a born-again Christian and quotes Psalm 144:1 on his webpage and fighter gear.

February 21, 2006 was officially named "Rich Franklin Day" in Cincinnati by the city's mayor.

== Business ==
American Fighter

In 2002, Franklin and his business partner, Jeff Adler, created the American Fighter athletic clothing brand. The brand featured t-shirts, but quickly grew to feature a full line of athletic training clothing, casual wear, and training gear for martial arts. In 2012, Affliction Clothing expressed interest in the name and its widespread appeal. They acquired the majority of the company and brought the brand to mainstream retailers, where it continues to grow.

Ze/Lin

In October 2013, Franklin and friend and business partner, Billy Zebe, launched Ze/Lin Organic Juice & Fusion Café in Beverly Hills, California. It closed nine months later and the company focused on wholesaling and distribution for the bottled juices.

ONE Championship

In May 2014, Franklin signed on as a vice president in the ONE Championship organization, a Singapore-based combat sports promotion which officially launched on July 14, 2011. Franklin serves as a face of the brand and travels throughout the US and Asia hosting seminars and speaking engagements, promoting fights, and working with the fighters. He hosts Rich Franklin's ONE Warrior Series, where he recruits up-and-coming martial artists for the promotion.

== Mixed martial arts ==
According to Franklin, he first learned karate at the Harrison Okinawan Karate Dojo in the early 1990s under Bill George and Steve Rafferty. He also studied submission fighting from instructional video tapes. He has been associated with and trained with Meat Truck, Inc. and currently trains at facilities run by Brazilian jiu-jitsu black belt Jorge Gurgel (New Generation Martial Arts), Neal Rowe, a Muay Thai instructor (Sacan Martial Arts), and Rob Radford, a boxing instructor (Boxing 4 Fitness).

Franklin is currently ranked as a black belt in Brazilian jiu-jitsu under Jorge Gurgel, which he earned on October 11, 2014. After losing his title to Anderson Silva, Franklin started training under Matt "The Wizard" Hume.

=== UFC career ===
Franklin began his UFC career with a perfect 3–0 start, including a victory over MMA veteran Evan Tanner at UFC 42, Edwin Dewees at UFC 44, and Jorge Rivera at UFC 50.

On April 5, 2005, Franklin fought in the main event of The Ultimate Fighter 1 Finale, which was the first live UFC card on free cable TV. He faced former UFC champion Ken Shamrock. Franklin defeated Shamrock by TKO at 2:42 of the first round, becoming the first person to stop Shamrock via strikes. The win established Franklin as one of the UFC's biggest stars and ensured him a title opportunity.

=== Middleweight title ===
A title shot came at UFC 53 on June 4, 2005. Franklin defeated Evan Tanner for a second time to win the UFC Middleweight Championship. The victory led to Franklin being named a coach, along with welterweight champion Matt Hughes, on the second season of The Ultimate Fighter.

At UFC 56 on November 19, 2005, Franklin defended his title against Nate Quarry, a competitor from season 1 of The Ultimate Fighter. Franklin won the fight via a first-round knockout.

At UFC 58 on March 4, 2006, Franklin defeated David Loiseau in a unanimous five-round decision to retain his title. Franklin broke his left hand early in the second round. The injury required surgery, including a metal plate and screws, and Franklin was out of action for six months.

=== Losing the title ===
At UFC 64 on October 14, 2006, Franklin lost his title to Anderson Silva. Their fight was stopped by TKO (knees) at 2:49 of the first round after Franklin received a knee to the face. Franklin was caught in a clinch by Silva and received a flurry of knees and kicks that rendered him unable to continue. On October 19, Franklin underwent surgery due to a nasal fracture he received during the fight.

Franklin made his return at UFC 68 on March 3, 2007 against Jason MacDonald. Franklin showed superior striking during the fight, mounted MacDonald in the closing seconds of the second round, and caused significant injury and swelling around MacDonald's left eye. MacDonald's corner advised ending the fight and Franklin was declared the winner by TKO (corner stoppage) between rounds. After the fight, Franklin called Anderson Silva to the octagon and said that he and Dana White had agreed to a fight for the title in Franklin's hometown of Cincinnati.

=== Return to contention ===
Franklin fought world ranked Yushin Okami at UFC 72 in Belfast, Northern Ireland on June 16, 2007. Franklin defeated the top middleweight contender by unanimous decision to be officially announced as the number one contender for Silva's middleweight title. The bout was only his second overall fight to go the full distance (due to being a non-title fight, it was three rounds). All three judges scored the bout 29–28 to Franklin. He also became the first person to fight in a UFC main event in Northern Ireland.

Franklin fought Silva for a second time at UFC 77 on October 20, 2007. Prior to the bout, he signed a six-fight contract with the UFC. Silva was able to effectively neutralize Franklin in the clinch, eventually defeating the former champion via TKO (knees) at 1:07 of the second round.

After his second loss to Anderson, Franklin began making regular trips to Seattle, WA to train with Matt Hume of AMC Pankration. At UFC 83 on April 19, 2008, Franklin faced Brazilian jiu-jitsu black belt Travis Lutter. During the bout, Lutter was able to secure a tight, high-level armbar, though Franklin was able to escape and go on to win the bout via TKO (strikes) at 3:01 of round two.

=== Move to Light Heavyweight ===
At UFC 88 on Sept. 6, 2008, Franklin made his return to the light heavyweight division against close friend and training partner Matt Hamill. Franklin won by TKO following a kick to Hamill's liver, which prompted the referee to call a stop to the fight at 0:39 of round three.

Franklin faced former PRIDE welterweight and middleweight champion Dan Henderson at UFC 93 in Dublin, Ireland on January 17, 2009 and lost by controversial split decision. Franklin became the first person to fight in a UFC main event in both Northern Ireland and the Republic of Ireland.

At UFC 99 in Cologne, Germany on June 13, 2009, Franklin defeated former Pride middleweight champion Wanderlei Silva via unanimous decision at a catchweight of 195 lbs. This fight earned him a $60,000 Fight of the Night award. Franklin became the first person to fight in the UFC in four different countries in four consecutive fights.

At UFC 103 on September 19, 2009, Franklin lost to former UFC light heavyweight champion Vitor Belfort. This was Belfort's first bout in the UFC since February 2005. After a lengthy feeling-out process, Belfort connected with a left hook that dropped Franklin, and followed up with a flurry of left hands that ended the contest via TKO at 3:02 in the first round. Though it was logged as a clear win for Belfort, there was discussion over multiple illegal blows to the back of Franklin's head.

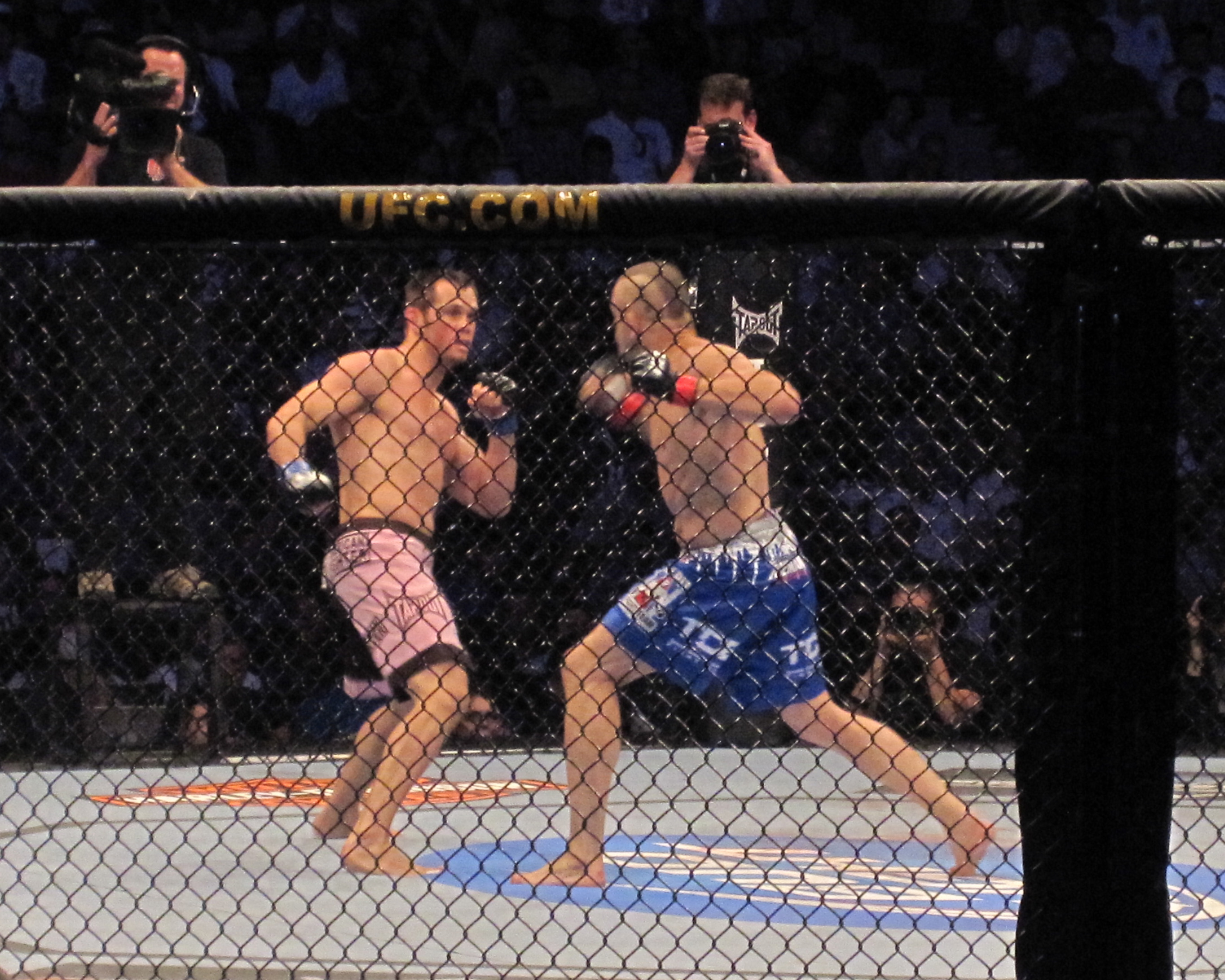
Rich Franklin vs. Chuck Liddell at UFC 115

Franklin was rumored to face multiple-time UFC champion Randy Couture at UFC 115, but was eventually confirmed to face former UFC light heavyweight champion Chuck Liddell on June 12, 2010, following the withdrawal of Liddell's original opponent, Tito Ortiz. During the contest, Liddell showed improved striking from that seen in his recent fights, and more proficient kicks. In the final seconds of the opening round, Liddell connected with a head kick and moved forward to attack a stunned Franklin, only to be knocked out by a compact counter right hand at 4:55 of the round. During the post-fight press conference, Franklin confirmed that his left forearm had been broken by a head kick Liddell threw during the middle of the round. The injury did not require surgery, which allowed Franklin to recover faster. This fight earned him a $85,000 Knockout of the Night award.

Franklin faced former UFC light heavyweight champion Forrest Griffin on February 5, 2011 at UFC 126 and lost via unanimous decision.

Franklin was scheduled to face Antônio Rogério Nogueira at UFC 133 on August 6, 2011 in Philadelphia. Nogueira was forced out of the bout due to a shoulder injury. Unable to find a suitable replacement on short notice, the UFC pulled Franklin from the card.

Franklin faced Wanderlei Silva in a rematch, replacing Vitor Belfort, who suffered a hand injury, in the main event at catchweight on June 23, 2012 at UFC 147. Franklin won the fight via unanimous decision, with both participants earning $65,000 Fight of the Night honors for their performances.

=== Return to Middleweight ===
Franklin returned to the middleweight division against former Strikeforce middleweight champion Cung Le on November 10, 2012 in the main event at UFC on Fuel TV 6. He lost the fight via knockout in the first round.

=== Retirement from MMA ===
After teasing the possibility of one more MMA fight before retiring, Franklin instead announced his retirement on September 28, 2015. He penned a column on theplayerstribune.com explaining that a recent conversation with his mother helped make the decision, along with the understanding that “his body has slowed down.”

During the April 13, 2019 broadcast of UFC 236, it was announced that Franklin would be inducted into the UFC Hall of Fame.

== Film career ==
Franklin made his acting debut in a film called Cyborg Soldier, in which he played an escaped super soldier and partnered with Tiffani Thiessen. In 2010, he starred in The Hammer, a story inspired by the life of deaf UFC fighter Matt Hamill. Franklin played MMA Coach Billings in the 2014 comedy Mantervention.

== Championships and accomplishments ==
=== Mixed martial arts ===
- Ultimate Fighting Championship
  - UFC Hall of Fame (Pioneer wing, Class of 2019)
  - UFC Middleweight Championship (One time)
    - Two successful title defenses
    - Tied (Dricus du Plessis) for fourth most UFC middleweight title wins (3)
  - Knockout of the Night (One time) vs. Chuck Liddell
  - Fight of the Night (Two times) vs. Wanderlei Silva (x2)
  - Third highest striking differential in UFC Middleweight division history (2.4)
  - Fifth highest takedown defense percentage in UFC Middleweight division history (83.3%)
  - UFC Encyclopedia Awards
    - Fight of the Night (Three times) vs. Evan Tanner 2, Nate Quarry and David Loiseau
    - Knockout of the Night (One time) vs. Nate Quarry
  - UFC.com Awards
    - 2005: Ranked #5 Knockout of the Year vs. Nate Quarry & Ranked #7 Fight of the Year vs. Evan Tanner 2
    - 2006: Ranked #8 Fight of the Year vs. David Loiseau
    - 2009: Ranked #4 Fight of the Year vs. Wanderlei Silva 1
    - 2010: Ranked #8 Knockout of the Year vs. Chuck Liddell
- FanSided
  - 2000s #8 Ranked MMA Fighter of the Decade
- Sherdog
  - Mixed Martial Arts Hall of Fame
- MMA Fighting
  - 2005 Middleweight Fighter of the Year

== Mixed martial arts record ==
Professional record breakdown
37 matches	29 wins	7 losses
By knockout	20	5
By submission	5	0
By decision	4	2
No contests	1	

Res.	Record	Opponent	Method	Event	Date	Round	Time	Location	Notes
Loss	29–7 (1)	Cung Le	KO (punch)	UFC on Fuel TV: Franklin vs. Le	November 10, 2012	1	2:17	Macau, SAR, China	Return to Middleweight.
Win	29–6 (1)	Wanderlei Silva	Decision (unanimous)	UFC 147	June 23, 2012	5	5:00	Belo Horizonte, Brazil	Catchweight (190 lbs) bout. Fight of the Night.
Loss	28–6 (1)	Forrest Griffin	Decision (unanimous)	UFC 126	February 5, 2011	3	5:00	Las Vegas, Nevada, United States	
Win	28–5 (1)	Chuck Liddell	KO (punch)	UFC 115	June 12, 2010	1	4:55	Vancouver, British Columbia, Canada	Knockout of the Night.
Loss	27–5 (1)	Vitor Belfort	TKO (punches)	UFC 103	September 19, 2009	1	3:02	Dallas, Texas, United States	Catchweight (195 lbs) bout.
Win	27–4 (1)	Wanderlei Silva	Decision (unanimous)	UFC 99	June 13, 2009	3	5:00	Cologne, Germany	Catchweight (195 lbs) bout. Fight of the Night.
Loss	26–4 (1)	Dan Henderson	Decision (split)	UFC 93	January 17, 2009	3	5:00	Dublin, Ireland	
Win	26–3 (1)	Matt Hamill	TKO (kick to the body)	UFC 88	September 6, 2008	3	0:39	Atlanta, Georgia, United States	Return to Light Heavyweight.
Win	25–3 (1)	Travis Lutter	TKO (punches)	UFC 83	April 19, 2008	2	3:01	Montreal, Quebec, Canada	
Loss	24–3 (1)	Anderson Silva	TKO (knees)	UFC 77	October 20, 2007	2	1:07	Cincinnati, Ohio, United States	For the UFC Middleweight Championship.
Win	24–2 (1)	Yushin Okami	Decision (unanimous)	UFC 72	June 16, 2007	3	5:00	Belfast, Northern Ireland, United Kingdom	UFC Middleweight title eliminator.
Win	23–2 (1)	Jason MacDonald	TKO (corner stoppage)	UFC 68	March 3, 2007	2	5:00	Columbus, Ohio, United States	
Loss	22–2 (1)	Anderson Silva	KO (knee)	UFC 64	October 14, 2006	1	2:59	Las Vegas, Nevada, United States	Lost the UFC Middleweight Championship.
Win	22–1 (1)	David Loiseau	Decision (unanimous)	UFC 58	March 4, 2006	5	5:00	Las Vegas, Nevada, United States	Defended the UFC Middleweight Championship.
Win	21–1 (1)	Nate Quarry	KO (punch)	UFC 56	November 19, 2005	1	2:34	Las Vegas, Nevada, United States	Defended the UFC Middleweight Championship.
Win	20–1 (1)	Evan Tanner	TKO (doctor stoppage)	UFC 53	June 4, 2005	4	3:25	Atlantic City, New Jersey, United States	Won the UFC Middleweight Championship; Won coaches position on The Ultimate Fighter 2.
Win	19–1 (1)	Ken Shamrock	TKO (punches)	The Ultimate Fighter 1 Finale	April 9, 2005	1	2:42	Las Vegas, Nevada, United States	Light Heavyweight bout.
Win	18–1 (1)	Curtis Stout	TKO (submission to punches)	SuperBrawl 38	December 12, 2004	2	1:28	Honolulu, Hawaii, United States	
Win	17–1 (1)	Jorge Rivera	Submission (armbar)	UFC 50	October 22, 2004	3	4:28	Atlantic City, New Jersey, United States	Middleweight debut.
Win	16–1 (1)	Ralph Dillon	Submission (kimura)	Alaska Fighting Championship	July 14, 2004	1	0:56	Anchorage, Alaska, United States	
Win	15–1 (1)	Leo Sylvest	TKO (submission to punches)	SuperBrawl 35	April 16, 2004	1	1:13	Honolulu, Hawaii, United States	
Loss	14–1 (1)	Lyoto Machida	TKO (head kick and punches)	Inoki Bom-Ba-Ye 2003	December 31, 2003	2	1:03	Kobe, Japan	Catchweight (214 lbs) bout.
Win	14–0 (1)	Edwin Dewees	TKO (punches and knees)	UFC 44	September 26, 2003	1	3:32	Las Vegas, Nevada, United States	
Win	13–0 (1)	Roberto Ramirez	KO (punch)	Battleground 1: War Cry	July 19, 2003	1	0:10	Villa Park, Illinois, United States	
Win	12–0 (1)	Evan Tanner	TKO (punches)	UFC 42	April 25, 2003	1	2:40	Miami, Florida, United States	UFC debut.
Win	11–0 (1)	Antony Rea	TKO (punches)	UCC Hawaii: Eruption in Hawaii	September 17, 2002	1	2:46	Honolulu, Hawaii, United States	
Win	10–0 (1)	Yan Pellerin	Submission (armbar)	UCC 10: Battle for the Belts 2002	June 15, 2002	1	3:23	Hull, Quebec, Canada	
Win	9–0 (1)	Marvin Eastman	Submission (armbar)	World Fighting Alliance 1	November 3, 2001	1	1:02	Las Vegas, Nevada, United States	
Win	8–0 (1)	Dennis Reed	TKO (submission to punches)	Extreme Challenge Trials	August 5, 2001	1	1:38	Cincinnati, Ohio, United States	
Win	7–0 (1)	Chris Seifert	TKO (submission to punches)	Extreme Challenge 41	July 13, 2001	2	1:45	Davenport, Iowa, United States	
Win	6–0 (1)	Travis Fulton	TKO (broken hand)	Rings USA: Battle of Champions	March 17, 2001	1	5:00	Council Bluffs, Iowa, United States	
NC	5–0 (1)	Aaron Brink	No Contest (accidental foot injury)	IFC: Warriors Challenge 11	January 13, 2001	1	2:42	Fresno, California, United States	For the IFC Light Heavyweight United States Championship. Originally ruled an injury TKO victory for Franklin, changed to NC because Brink's foot got caught between the mat and the cage fence.
Win	5–0	Dennis Reed	Submission (armbar)	Extreme Challenge 35	June 29, 2000	1	1:56	Davenport, Iowa, United States	
Win	4–0	Gary Myers	KO (head kick)	WEF 9: World Class	May 13, 2000	3	0:59	Evansville, Indiana, United States	
Win	3–0	Rob Smith	TKO (punches)	Extreme Challenge 31	March 24, 2000	1	2:30	Kenosha, Wisconsin, United States	
Win	2–0	Eugene Pinault	TKO (submission to punches)	Extreme Challenge: Trials	October 4, 1999	1	1:27	Davenport, Iowa, United States	
Win	1–0	Michael Martin	KO (head kick)	World Extreme Fighting 6	June 19, 1999	1	0:21	Wheeling, West Virginia, United States	

== Pay-Per-View Bouts ==
No.	Fight	Event	City	Venue	PPV Buys
1.	Franklin vs. Quarry	UFC 56	Las Vegas, Nevada	MGM Grand Arena	200,000
2.	Franklin vs. Loiseau	UFC 58	Las Vegas, Nevada	Mandalay Bay Events Center	300,000
3.	Silva vs. Franklin	UFC 64	Las Vegas, Nevada	Mandalay Bay Events Center	300,000
4.	Franklin vs. Okami	UFC 72	Belfast, Northern Ireland	Odyssey Complex	200,000
5.	Silva vs. Franklin 2	UFC 77	Cincinnati, Ohio	Heritage Bank Center	325,000
6.	Franklin vs. Henderson	UFC 93	Dublin, Ireland	3Arena	350,000
7.	Franklin vs. Silva	UFC 99	Cologne, Germany	Lanxess Arena	365,000
8.	Franklin vs. Belfort	UFC 103	Dallas, Texas	American Airlines Center	375,000
9.	Liddell vs. Franklin	UFC 115	Vancouver, British Columbia	Rogers Arena	520,000
10	Silva vs. Franklin II	UFC 147	Belo Horizonte, Brazil	Mineirinho Arena	175,000

== See also ==
- List of current UFC fighters
- List of male mixed martial artists

Preceded by Evan Tanner	4th UFC Middleweight Champion; June 4, 2005 – October 14, 2006	Succeeded by Anderson Silva
