= David Loiseau =

Canadian taekwondo practitioner and mixed martial arts

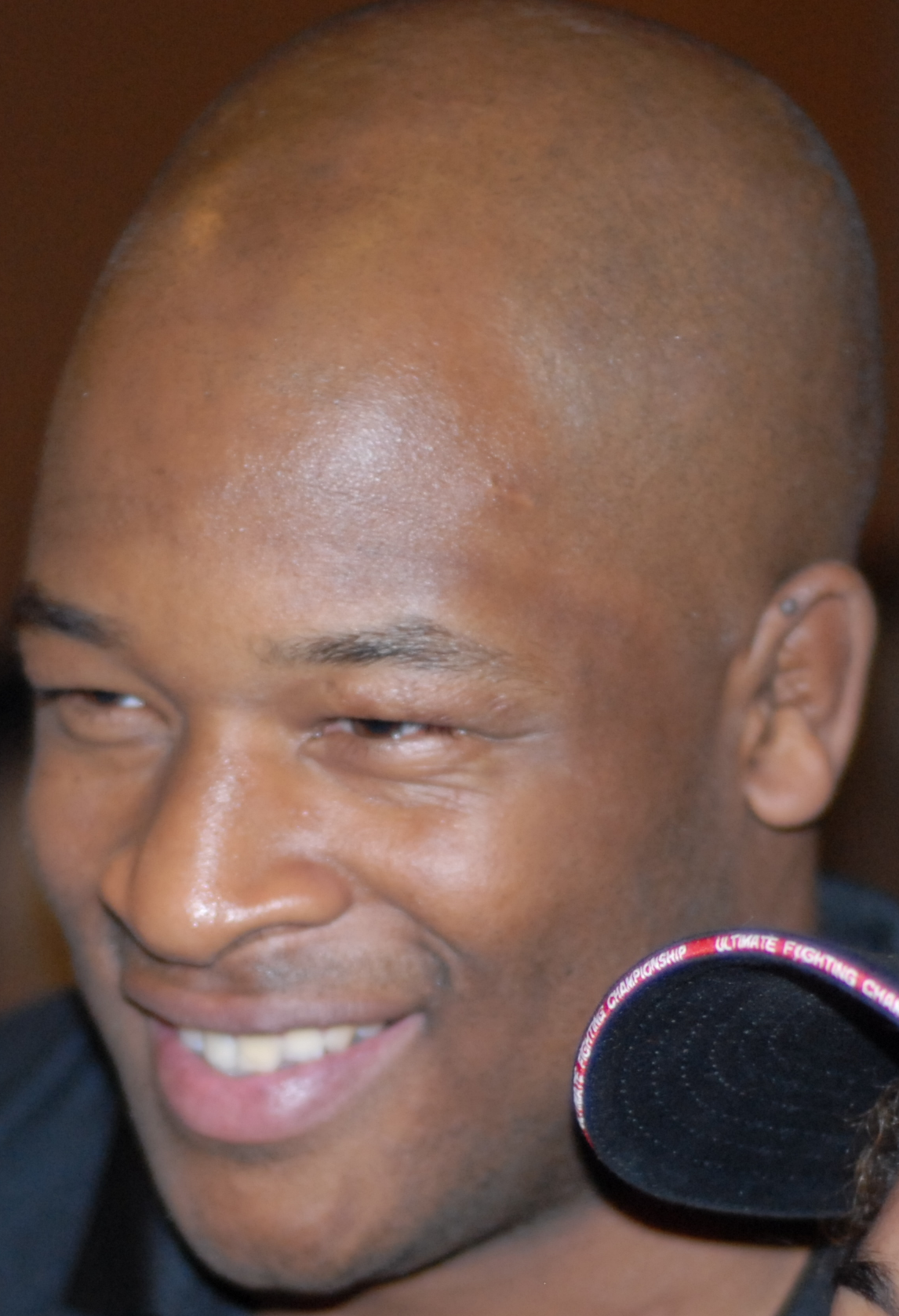
- Born: December 17, 1979 (age 46); Montreal, Quebec, Canada
- Other names: The Crow
- Height: 6 ft 0 in (1.83 m)
- Weight: 185 lb (84 kg; 13.2 st)
- Division: Middleweight (2000–2013); Light Heavyweight (2013–2014)
- Fighting out of: Montreal, Quebec, Canada
- Team: Jackson's Submission Fighting; Zahabi MMA
- Rank: Black Belt in Brazilian jiu-jitsu under Jorge Santiago; Black Belt in Taekwondo
- Years active: 2000–2014

Mixed martial arts record
- Total: 34
- Wins: 23
- By knockout: 15
- By submission: 3
- By decision: 5
- Losses: 11
- By knockout: 2
- By submission: 2
- By decision: 7
- Draws: 0
- No contests: 0

Other information
- Website: http://www.crowmma.com/
- Mixed martial arts record from Sherdog

David Loiseau (French pronunciation: [david lwazo]; born December 17, 1979) is a Canadian former mixed martial artist from Montreal, Quebec. He has fought in the Ultimate Fighting Championship, EliteXC, and TKO Major League MMA veteran. He is the former TKO World Middleweight Champion and former two-time TKO Canadian Middleweight Champion. He was also a former TPF Middleweight Champion. He was the first French-speaking Canadian to fight in the Ultimate Fighting Championship. Loiseau has also played a gang member in French-Canadian movie La rage de l'ange. Loiseau wrote and acted in a short film called Keelos, featuring hip-hop artist Imposs and Stand-up comedian Eddy King.

== Biography ==
David Loiseau was born in Montreal, Quebec, Canada to Haitian parents. He had expressed his concern for the people of Haiti and for his grandparents who were still residing in Haiti at the time of the earthquake of 2010. He has urged people to donate and to help the country as much as they can. "I don't want to sleep," he said. "I want to get the message out."

== MMA career ==
=== UCC ===
Loiseau began his MMA career fighting for the Canadian-based Universal Combat Challenge (UCC) (later sold and renamed TKO Major League MMA.) He earned a record of 8–2, including wins over Shawn Tompkins, Joe Doerksen and Tony Fryklund.

=== Ultimate Fighting Championship ===
Loiseau made his UFC debut in April 2003 at UFC 42, defeating Mark Weir by KO. Later in the year, at UFC 44, he lost a unanimous decision to Jorge Rivera.

After going 2–1 in the TKO promotion, Loiseau returned to the UFC in 2005 with TKO wins of Gideon Ray, Charles McCarthy and Evan Tanner. He then lost back-to-back unanimous decisions in 2006, to Rich Franklin at UFC 58 and to Mike Swick at UFC 63.

In 2009, after going 4–2 in smaller promotions, Loiseau returned again, losing another unanimous decision to Ed Herman at UFC 97. He was subsequently released from the UFC.

After a TKO win over Chester Post at MFL 2 - Battleground, Loiseau returned to the UFC and lost to Mario Miranda via TKO on June 12, 2010, at UFC 115. He was again released from the UFC following this loss.

=== Independent Promotions ===
In his first fight after his last UFC release, Loiseau defeated Leopoldo Serao at Tachi Palace Fights 8: All or Nothing for the TPF Middleweight Championship via TKO in the fifth round, when the doctor declared Serao too badly cut to continue.

Loiseau was expected to defend the title at TPF 10 on Aug 5, against Givanildo Santana. But on July 28, 2011, Loiseau's agent announced he had sustained an injury which would require surgery, and would not be able to fight. Loiseau later revealed in an interview with KORE Vision that he underwent two surgeries, one in September and the other in November 2011, for an inside and outside meniscus repair in his left elbow.

Loiseau made his return to the cage to defeat Christopher McNally by TKO at the CES event Real Pain on October 6, 2012, at the Dunkin’ Donuts Center in Providence, Rhode Island.

Loiseau was scheduled to fight in Calgary on July 12, 2013, against Marcus Vinicius for Aggression Fighting Championship 20, but the Calgary commission did not allow that fight. He instead fought in Montreal at Challenge MMA 2 on August 17, taking a unanimous decision from Caleb Grummet.

Loiseau was scheduled to fight Mike Kent on October 25, in the main event of ECC 18 in Halifax, Nova Scotia. Loiseau won the ECC Light-Heavyweight title with a quick TKO over Kent.

Loiseau faced Dwayne Lewis on June 7, 2014, in the main event at WSOF Canada 2. Loiseau lost via unanimous decision.

== Filmography ==
Loiseau was co-featured in a mixed martial arts documentary The Striking Truth (2010) alongside Georges St-Pierre.

In 2012, Loiseau was the main character in a reality TV show Crowtime, focusing on following Loiseau around the world searching for training.

== Personal life ==
After his retirement from MMA, Loiseau has been running his own professional MMA gym Crow training center in his native Montreal. Alongside his own business, Loiseau also teaches at Montreal Wrestling Club and Jorge Santiago's Xcell Jiu-Jitsu in Florida.

== Championships and accomplishments ==
- Ultimate Fighting Championship
  - UFC Encyclopedia Awards
    - Fight of the Night (Two times) vs. Evan Tanner and Rich Franklin
    - Knockout of the Night (Two times) vs. Mark Weir and Charles McCarthy
  - UFC.com Awards
    - 2005: Ranked #10 Knockout of the Year & Ranked #8 Fight of the Year vs. Charles McCarthy
    - 2006: Ranked #8 Fight of the Year vs. Rich Franklin
- Extreme Cage Combat
  - ECC Light Heavyweight Championship (One time, current)
- Tachi Palace Fights
  - TPF Middleweight Championship (One time)
- TKO Major League MMA/UCC
  - TKO World Middleweight Championship (One time)
  - TKO Canadian Middleweight Championship (Two time)
- Brazilian jiu-jitsu
  - Awarded black belt in Brazilian jiu-jitsu on May 17, 2017, by Jorge Santiago

== Mixed martial arts record ==
Professional record breakdown
34 matches	23 wins	11 losses
By knockout	15	2
By submission	3	2
By decision	5	7

Res.	Record	Opponent	Method	Event	Date	Round	Time	Location	Notes
Loss	23–11	Dwayne Lewis	Decision (unanimous)	WSOF Canada 2	June 7, 2014	3	5:00	Edmonton, Alberta, Canada	
Win	23–10	Mike Kent	TKO (punches)	ECC 18 - Road to Glory	October 25, 2013	1	0:15	Halifax, Nova Scotia, Canada	Won the ECC Light Heavyweight Championship.
Win	22–10	Caleb Grummet	Decision (unanimous)	Challenge MMA 2	August 17, 2013	3	5:00	Montreal, Quebec, Canada	
Win	21–10	Christopher McNally	TKO (doctor stoppage)	CES 12: Real Pain	October 6, 2012	1	2:30	Providence, Rhode Island, United States	
Win	20–10	Leopoldo Serao	TKO (doctor stoppage)	TPF 8: All or Nothing	February 18, 2011	5	1:12	Lemoore, California, United States	Won the TPF Middleweight Championship.
Loss	19–10	Mario Miranda	TKO (punches)	UFC 115	June 12, 2010	2	4:07	Vancouver, British Columbia, Canada	
Win	19–9	Chester Post	TKO (punches)	MFL 2 Battleground	February 27, 2010	1	4:40	Montreal, Quebec, Canada	
Loss	18–9	Ed Herman	Decision (unanimous)	UFC 97	April 18, 2009	3	5:00	Montreal, Quebec, Canada	
Win	18–8	Solomon Hutcherson	TKO (knees)	Xtreme MMA 5: It's Crow Time	September 13, 2008	5	1:56	Montreal, Quebec, Canada	
Win	17–8	Andrew Buckland	KO (punches)	Legacy FC: Resurrection	June 20, 2008	1	0:20	Calgary, Alberta, Canada	
Win	16–8	Todd Gouwenberg	Decision (unanimous)	HCF: Crow's Nest	March 29, 2008	3	5:00	Gatineau, Quebec, Canada	
Loss	15–8	Jason Day	Decision (split)	HCF: Destiny	February 1, 2008	3	5:00	Calgary, Alberta, Canada	
Win	15–7	Freddie Espiricueta	Submission (arm-triangle choke)	Art of War 2	May 11, 2007	2	3:10	Austin, Texas, United States	
Loss	14–7	Joey Villaseñor	Decision (unanimous)	EliteXC Destiny	February 10, 2007	3	5:00	Southaven, Mississippi, United States	
Loss	14–6	Mike Swick	Decision (unanimous)	UFC 63: Hughes vs. Penn	September 23, 2006	3	5:00	Anaheim, California, United States	
Loss	14–5	Rich Franklin	Decision (unanimous)	UFC 58: USA vs. Canada	March 4, 2006	5	5:00	Las Vegas, Nevada, United States	For the UFC Middleweight Championship.
Win	14–4	Evan Tanner	TKO (doctor stoppage)	UFC Ultimate Fight Night 2	October 3, 2005	2	4:15	Las Vegas, Nevada, United States	UFC Middleweight title eliminator.
Win	13–4	Charles McCarthy	TKO (spinning back kick and flying knee)	UFC 53	June 4, 2005	2	2:10	Atlantic City, New Jersey, United States	
Win	12–4	Gideon Ray	TKO (doctor stoppage)	UFC 51	February 5, 2005	1	5:00	Las Vegas, Nevada, United States	
Win	11–4	Curtis Stout	Decision (unanimous)	TKO 17: Revenge	September 25, 2004	3	5:00	Victoriaville, Quebec, Canada	
Win	10–4	Chris Fontaine	KO (punch)	TKO 16: Infernal	May 22, 2004	1	0:13	Quebec City, Quebec, Canada	Won the TKO Canadian Middleweight Championship.
Loss	9–4	Jeremy Horn	Submission (guillotine choke)	TKO 15: Unstoppable	February 28, 2004	1	0:54	Montreal, Quebec, Canada	Lost the TKO World Middleweight Championship.
Loss	9–3	Jorge Rivera	Decision (unanimous)	UFC 44	September 26, 2003	3	5:00	Las Vegas, Nevada, United States	
Win	9–2	Mark Weir	KO (punches)	UFC 42	April 25, 2003	1	3:55	Miami, Florida, United States	
Win	8–2	Tony Fryklund	TKO (doctor stoppage)	UCC 12: Adrenaline	January 25, 2003	1	4:24	Montreal, Quebec, Canada	Defended the UCC World Middleweight Championship.
Win	7–2	Jesse Jones	Decision (unanimous)	UCC 11: The Next Level	October 11, 2002	3	5:00	Montreal, Quebec, Canada	Won the UCC World Middleweight Championship.
Win	6–2	Claudionor Fontinelle	TKO (punches)	UCC 8: Fast and Furious	March 30, 2002	2	0:56	Rimouski, Quebec, Canada	
Win	5–2	Joe Doerksen	Decision (unanimous)	UCC 7: Bad Boyz	January 25, 2002	3	5:00	Montreal, Quebec, Canada	
Win	4–2	Anis Abdelli	Submission (rear-naked choke)	UCC 6: Redemption	October 19, 2001	1	1:41	Montreal, Quebec, Canada	
Win	3–2	Shawn Tompkins	TKO (punches)	UCC 4: Return Of The Super Strikers	May 12, 2001	1	1:26	Sherbrooke, Quebec, Canada	
Loss	2–2	Jason St. Louis	TKO (punches)	UCC 3: Battle for the Belts	January 27, 2001	1	2:42	Sherbrooke, Quebec, Canada	Lost the UCC Canadian Middleweight Championship
Win	2–1	Steve Vigneault	TKO (corner stoppage)	TKO Major League 2: Moment of Truth	August 12, 2000	1	10:00	Montreal, Quebec, Canada	UCC Canadian Middleweight Tournament Final. Won the UCC Canadian Middleweight Championship.
Win	1–1	Justin Bruckmann	Submission (guillotine choke)	TKO Major League 2: Moment of Truth	August 12, 2000	1	3:07	Montreal, Quebec, Canada	UCC Canadian Middleweight Tournament Semifinal.
Loss	0–1	Justin Bruckmann	Submission (armbar)	TKO Major League 1: The New Beginning	June 2, 2000	1	3:04	Montreal, Quebec, Canada	
