= 2001 in World Extreme Cagefighting =

2001 in WEC

Information
- First date: January 8, 2001
- Last date: October 4, 2001

Events
- Total events: 2

Fights
- Total fights: 23

Chronology
| 2001 in WEC | 2002 in WEC |

The year 2001 was the 1st year in the history of World Extreme Cagefighting, a mixed martial arts promotion based in the United States. In 2001 WEC held 2 events beginning with, WEC 1: Princes of Pain.

== Events list ==
| No. | Event | Date | Venue | Location | Attendance |
|---|---|---|---|---|---|
| 2 | WEC 2: Clash of the Titans | October 4, 2001 | Tachi Palace Hotel & Casino | Lemoore, California | |
| 1 | WEC 1: Princes of Pain | June 30, 2001 | Tachi Palace Hotel & Casino | Lemoore, California | |

== WEC 2: Clash of the Titans ==
WEC 2: Clash of the Titans was an event held on October 4, 2001 at the Tachi Palace in Lemoore, California, United States.

== Results ==
Main Card
| Weight class | | | | Method | Round | Time | Notes |
|---|---|---|---|---|---|---|---|
| | Cole Escovedo | def. | Terry Dull | submission (triangle choke) | 1 | 1:54 |
| | Ryan Ackerman | def. | Rob Cole | TKO (retirement) | 2 | 5:00 |
| | Eric Duus | def. | Kory Hangas | decision | 3 | 5:00 |
| | Benji Radach | def. | Royden Demotta | TKO (punches) | 1 | 1:01 |
| | Charlie Pearson | def. | Nick Agallar | decision | 3 | 5:00 |
| | Jimmy Terrel | def. | Anthony Hamlett | decision | 3 | 5:00 |
| | Leandro Niza | def. | Marcus Blood | TKO (punches) | 1 | 1:20 |
| | Cruz Gomez | def. | David Bancroft | submission (knees) | 1 | 3:37 |
| | Aaron Steed | def. | Josh Houlgate | TKO (punches) | 1 | 1:16 |
| | Rob McCullough | def. | Jesse Heck | TKO (head kick) | 1 | 0:24 |
| | Eric Swartz | def. | Bruce Nelson | submission (punches) | 1 | 0:59 |
| | Philip Perez | def. | Justin Jones | TKO (punches) | 1 | 4:20 |
| | Gan McGee | def. | Ron Faircloth | TKO (punches) | 1 | 0:12 |

== WEC 1: Princes of Pain ==
WEC 1: Princes of Pain was an event held on June 30, 2001 at the Tachi Palace in Lemoore, California, United States.

=== Results ===
Main Card
| Weight class | | | | Method | Round | Time | Notes |
|---|---|---|---|---|---|---|---|
| | Cruz Gomez | def. | Isaias Martinez | KO (elbows) | 1 | 4:58 |
| | Leonard Garcia | def. | Victor Estrada | KO (head kick) | 2 | 0:54 |
| | Nick Agallar | def. | Ray Benavides | TKO (punches) | 2 | 4:29 |
| | Chris Sanford | def. | Bobby Martin | KO (punch) | 2 | 0:29 |
| | Phil Ensminger | def. | Gabriel Garcia | TKO (punches) | 1 | 0:59 |
| | Scott Carson | def. | Bryson Haubrick | submission | 1 | 2:20 |
| | Tony Alanis | def. | Bryant Garcia | submission (strikes) | 1 | 1:33 |
| | Lalo Moz | def. | Bruce Nelson | KO (punch) | 1 | 0:08 |
| | Gan McGee | def. | Seth Petruzelli | Submission (heel hook) | 1 | 1:25 |
| | Dan Severn | def. | Travis Fulton | unanimous decision | 3 | 5:00 |

== See also ==
- World Extreme Cagefighting
- List of WEC events
