= 2003 in WEC =

World Extreme Cagefighting events

Information
- First date: March 27, 2003
- Last date: October 17, 2003

Events
- Total events: 3

Fights
- Total fights: 40
- Title fights: 5

Chronology
2002 in WEC	2003 in WEC	2004 in WEC

The year 2003 was the 3rd year in the history of World Extreme Cagefighting, a mixed martial arts promotion based in the United States. In 2003 WEC held 3 events beginning with, WEC 6: Return of a Legend.

== Title fights ==
Title fights in 2003
Weight class				Method	Round	Time	Event	Notes
Light Heavyweight	Frank Shamrock	def.	Bryan Pardoe	Submission (Armbar)	1	1:46	WEC 6: Return of a Legend	(Note: For the WEC Light Heavyweight Championship.)
Welterweight	Nick Diaz	def.	Joe Hurley	Submission (Kimura)	1	1:55	WEC 6: Return of a Legend	(Note: For the WEC Welterweight Championship.)
Super Heavyweight	Ron Waterman	def.	James Nevarez	TKO (Punches)	3	2:31	WEC 7: This Time It's Personal	(Note: For the WEC Super Heavyweight Championship.)
Welterweight	Shonie Carter	def.	Dax Bruce	Submission (Rear-Naked Choke)	1	2:28	WEC 7: This Time It's Personal	(Note: For the WEC Welterweight Championship.)
Featherweight	Cole Escovedo (c)	def.	Anthony Hamlett	TKO (Punches)	2	1:30	WEC 8: Halloween Fury 2	(Note: For the WEC Featherweight Championship.)

== Events list ==
No.	Event	Date	Venue	Location	Attendance
8	WEC 8: Halloween Fury 2	October 17, 2003	Tachi Palace Hotel & Casino	Lemoore, California	
7	WEC 7: This Time It's Personal	August 9, 2003	Tachi Palace Hotel & Casino	Lemoore, California	
6	WEC 6: Return of a Legend	March 27, 2003	Tachi Palace Hotel & Casino	Lemoore, California	

== WEC 6: Return of a Legend ==
WEC 6: Return of a Legend
- Promotion: World Extreme Cagefighting
- Date: March 27, 2003
- Venue: Tachi Palace
- City: Lemoore, California

Event chronology
WEC 5: Halloween Havoc	WEC 6: Return of a Legend	WEC 7: This Time It's Personal

WEC 6: Return of a Legend was an event held on March 27, 2003 at the Tachi Palace in Lemoore, California, United States.

=== Results ===
Main Card
Weight class				Method	Round	Time	Notes
Light Heavyweight	Frank Shamrock	def.	Bryan Pardoe	Submission (Armbar)	1	1:46	(Note: For the inaugural WEC Light Heavyweight Championship.)
	Gil Castillo	def.	Chris Williams	TKO (Corner Stoppage)	1	5:00
	Jeremy Jackson	def.	Shonie Carter	Decision (Unanimous)	3	5:00
	Brian Stromberg	def.	Levi Thornbrue	TKO (Submission to Punches)	1	1:43
Welterweight	Nick Diaz	def.	Joe Hurley	Submission (Kimura)	1	1:55	(Note: For the inaugural WEC Welterweight Championship.)
	Gilbert Melendez	def.	Jeff Hougland	TKO (Punches)	2	2:05
	Mike Swick	def.	Kengo Ura	KO (Knee)	3	0:31
	Bret Bergmark	def.	Brodie Farber	TKO (Punches)	1	3:57
	Brandon Wolff	def.	Hannibal Adofo	Decision (Split)	3	5:00
	Tim McKenzie	def.	John Appleby	TKO (Punches)	1	1:03
	Ed Wedding	def.	Doug Evans	Submission (Armbar)	1	4:37
	Chris Sanford	def.	Jack Cardenas	Submission (Armbar)	1	2:45
	Poppies Martinez	def.	Erick Husbands	KO (Punches)	1	0:10
	Carlos Cordero	def.	Steve Cutler	Submission (Armbar)	1	2:31

== WEC 7: This Time It's Personal ==
WEC 7: This Time It's Personal was an event held on August 9, 2003 at the Tachi Palace in Lemoore, California, United States.

=== Results ===
Main Card
Weight class				Method	Round	Time	Notes
Super Heavyweight	Ron Waterman	def.	James Nevarez	TKO (Punches)	3	2:31	(Note: For the WEC Super Heavyweight Championship.)
Welterweight	Tony Alanis	def.	Don Rugebreght	TKO (Submission to punches)	1	1:54
	Wander Braga	def.	Nick Ertl	Decision (Unanimous)	3	5:00
Welterweight	Shonie Carter	def.	Dax Bruce	Submission (Rear-Naked Choke)	1	2:28	(Note: For the WEC Welterweight Championship.)
Light Heavyweight	Boyd Ballard	vs.	Abraham Baxter	Draw	3	5:00
Lightweight	Olaf Alfonso	def.	Randy Spence	TKO (Punches)	2	4:34
Welterweight	J.T. Taylor	def.	Ryan Schultz	KO (Punches)	2	1:56
Welterweight	Jason Von Flue	def.	Nick Gilardi	Technical Submission (Arm-Triangle Choke)	1	2:46
Heavyweight	Anthony Arria	def.	Levi Thornbrue	TKO (Punches)	1	1:29
Middleweight	Poppies Martinez	def.	Johnny Fadella	TKO (Knees)	1	0:51
Featherweight	Jorge Evangelista	def.	Gary Quan	TKO (Shoulder Injury)	1	4:26
Lightweight	Gabe Ruediger	def.	Carlos Cordero	TKO (Punches)	1	2:57
Middleweight	Michael Brown	def.	John Letters	Submission (Rear-Naked Choke)	1	0:54

== WEC 8: Halloween Fury 2 ==
WEC 8: Halloween Fury 2 was an event held on October 17, 2003 at the Tachi Palace in Lemoore, California, United States.

=== Results ===
Main Card
Weight class				Method	Round	Time	Notes
Featherweight	Cole Escovedo (c)	def.	Anthony Hamlett	TKO (Punches)	2	1:30	(Note: For the WEC Featherweight Championship.)
Heavyweight	Mike Kyle	def.	Jerry Vrbanovic	KO (Punches)	1	0:12
Welterweight	Shonie Carter	def.	J.T. Taylor	Decision (Unanimous)	3	5:00
Heavyweight	Doug Marshall	def.	Anthony Fuller	TKO (Submission to punches)	1	0:32
Welterweight	Tom Owens	def.	Tony Alanis	Submission (Triangle Armbar)	1	1:49
Middleweight	Chris Leben	def.	Brian Sleeman	Submission (Armbar)	1	3:15
Lightweight	Poppies Martinez	def.	AJ Wieman	Submission (Rear-Naked Choke)	1	2:01
	Fernando Gonzalez	def.	Mike Castillo	TKO (Punches)	1	1:27
	Sean Liddell	def.	Chris Saunders	TKO (Corner Stoppage)	1	5:00
Welterweight	Ryan Schultz	def.	Hannibal Adofo	KO (Punch)	1	0:25
Lightweight	Olaf Alfonso	def.	Randy Bowers	Submission (Armbar)	1	3:05
Welterweight	Jason Von Flue	def.	Chris Irvine	Submission (Arm-Triangle Choke)	1	2:04
Light Heavyweight	Richard Montoya	def.	Travis Stuart	Submission (Standing Guillotine)	1	0:38

== See also ==
- World Extreme Cagefighting
- List of World Extreme Cagefighting champions
- List of WEC events
