= 2002 in WEC =

World Extreme Cagefighting events

Information
- First date: June 7, 2002
- Last date: October 18, 2002

Events
- Total events: 3

Fights
- Total fights: 29

Chronology
| 2001 in WEC | 2002 in WEC | 2003 in WEC |

The year 2002 was the 2nd year in the history of World Extreme Cagefighting, a mixed martial arts promotion based in the United States. In 2002 WEC held 3 events beginning with, WEC 3: All or Nothing.

== Events list ==
| No. | Event | Date | Venue | Location | Attendance |
|---|---|---|---|---|---|
| 5 | WEC 5: Halloween Havoc | October 18, 2002 | Tachi Palace Hotel & Casino | Lemoore, California | |
| 4 | WEC 4: Rumble Under the Sun | August 31, 2002 | Mohegan Sun Arena | Uncasville, Connecticut | |
| 3 | WEC 3: All or Nothing | June 7, 2002 | Tachi Palace Hotel & Casino | Lemoore, California | |

== WEC 3: All or Nothing ==
WEC 3: All or Nothing was an event held on June 7, 2002 at the Tachi Palace in Lemoore, California, United States.

=== Results ===
Main Card
| Weight class | | | | Method | Round | Time | Notes |
|---|---|---|---|---|---|---|---|
| Heavyweight | Aaron Brink | def. | Zane Frazier | TKO (Punches) | 1 | 1:00 |
| Lightweight | Jimmy Terrel | def. | Travis Doerge | TKO (Punches) | 1 | 3:37 |
| Light Heavyweight | Eric Schwartz | def. | Glover Teixeira | TKO (Punches and Elbows) | 2 | 3:33 |
| Welterweight | Tony Alanis | def. | Jesse Heck | TKO (Punches) | 1 | 0:14 |
| Featherweight | Cole Escovedo | def. | Paul Morris | Submission (Triangle Choke) | 1 | 0:29 |
| Lightweight | Rich Crunkilton | def. | Cruz Gomez | TKO (Punches) | 1 | 3:04 |
| Middleweight | Sherk Julian | def. | Shannon Ritch | TKO (Submission to punches) | 1 | 1:57 |
| Welterweight | Pat Minihan | def. | Eddy Ellis | Decision (Unanimous) | 3 | 5:00 |
| Middleweight | Jason Pratt | def. | Jack Cardenas | Submission (Rear-Naked Choke) | 1 | 3:21 |
| Featherweight | Anthony Hamlett | def. | Caleb Mitchell | TKO (Punches) | 3 | 3:45 |
| Welterweight | Mike Castillo | def. | Tim Dominquez | KO (Punches) | 1 | 1:01 |

== WEC 4: Rumble Under the Sun ==
WEC 4: Rumble Under the Sun was an event held on August 31, 2002 at the Mohegan Sun Arena in Uncasville, Connecticut.

=== Results ===
Main Card
| Weight class | | | | Method | Round | Time | Notes |
|---|---|---|---|---|---|---|---|
| Heavyweight | Jeremy Horn | def. | Aaron Brink | Submission (rear-naked choke) | 1 | 0:54 |
| Lightweight | Rich Crunkilton | def. | Luciano Oliveira | Submission (armbar) | 1 | 1:55 |
| Lightweight | Kurt Pellegrino | def. | Mac Danzig | Decision (unanimous) | 3 | 5:00 |
| Middleweight | Tony Fryklund | def. | Zach Light | Submission (kimura) | 1 | 4:06 |
| Heavyweight | Christian Wellisch | def. | Jay White | TKO (punches) | 3 | 3:42 |
| Heavyweight | John Rallo | def. | Erik Mainiai | TKO (Submission to punches) | 1 | 3:06 |
| Light Heavyweight | Randy Rowe | def. | Jason Jones | DQ (punching after the bell) | 1 | 5:00 |
| Middleweight | Mike Swick | def. | James Gabert | Decision (unanimous) | 3 | 5:00 |
| Lightweight | Jeff Curran | def. | Bao Quach | Decision (majority) | 3 | 5:00 |

== WEC 5: Halloween Havoc ==
WEC 5: Halloween Havoc
- Promotion: World Extreme Cagefighting
- Date: October 18, 2002
- Venue: Tachi Palace
- City: Lemoore, California

Event chronology
| WEC 4 | WEC 5: Halloween Havoc | WEC 6 |

WEC 5: Halloween Havoc was an event held on October 18, 2002 at the Tachi Palace in Lemoore, California, United States.

=== Results ===
Main Card
| Weight class | | | | Method | Round | Time | Notes |
|---|---|---|---|---|---|---|---|
| Featherweight | Cole Escovedo | def. | Philip Perez | Submission (triangle choke) | 1 | 3:07 | (Note: For the inaugural WEC Featherweight Championship.) |
| Featherweight | Jeff Bedard | def. | Antonio Banuelos | Submission (guillotine choke) | 1 | 0:43 |
| Lightweight | Rich Crunkilton | def. | Victor Estrada | TKO (ankle injury) | 1 | 1:11 |
| Light Heavyweight | Tim Kennedy | def. | Mack Brewer | TKO (punches) | 1 | 1:03 |
| Middleweight | Diallo Baza | def. | Chris Mooney | TKO (punches) | 2 | 1:55 |
| Lightweight | Gilbert Melendez | def. | Gary Quan | TKO (punches) | 1 | 4:37 |
| Featherweight | Alex Khanbabian | def. | Alex Chu Kung | TKO (punches) | 2 | 1:55 |
| Lightweight | Sam Wells | def. | Gabe Ruediger | KO (punch) | 1 | 4:22 |
| Welterweight | Justin Wieman | def. | Daniel Camarillo | Decision (split) | 3 | 5:00 |

== See also ==
- World Extreme Cagefighting
- List of World Extreme Cagefighting champions
- List of WEC events
