= WEC 2 =

WEC MMA events in 2001

WEC 2: Clash of the Titans
- Promotion: World Extreme Cagefighting
- Date: October 4, 2001
- Venue: Tachi Palace Hotel & Casino
- City: Lemoore, California

Event chronology
WEC 1: Princes of Pain	WEC 2: Clash of the Titans	WEC 3: All or Nothing

WEC 2: Clash of the Titans was a mixed martial arts event held on October 4, 2001, at the Tachi Palace Hotel & Casino in Lemoore, California. WEC 2's main event was a fight between Gan McGee and Ron Faircloth.

== Results ==
Main Card
Weight class				Method	Round	Time	Notes
	Cole Escovedo	def.	Terry Dull	submission (triangle choke)	1	1:54
	Ryan Ackerman	def.	Rob Cole	TKO (retirement)	2	5:00
	Eric Duus	def.	Kory Hangas	decision	3	5:00
	Benji Radach	def.	Royden Demotta	TKO (punches)	1	1:01
	Charlie Pearson	def.	Nick Agallar	decision	3	5:00
	Jimmy Terrel	def.	Anthony Hamlett	decision	3	5:00
	Leandro Niza	def.	Marcus Blood	TKO (punches)	1	1:20
	Cruz Gomez	def.	David Bancroft	TKO (Submission to knees)	1	3:37
	Aaron Steed	def.	Josh Houlgate	TKO (punches)	1	1:16
	Rob McCullough	def.	Jesse Heck	TKO (head kick)	1	0:24
	Eric Swartz	def.	Bruce Nelson	TKO (Submission to punches)	1	0:59
	Philip Perez	def.	Justin Jones	TKO (punches)	1	4:20
	Gan McGee	def.	Ron Faircloth	TKO (punches)	1	0:12

== See also ==
- World Extreme Cagefighting
- List of WEC champions
- List of WEC events
- 2001 in World Extreme Cagefighting
