= WEC 8 =

WEC MMA events in 2003

WEC 8: Halloween Fury 2
- Promotion: World Extreme Cagefighting
- Date: October 17, 2003
- Venue: Palace Indian Gaming Center
- City: Lemoore, California

Event chronology
WEC 7: This Time It's Personal	WEC 8: Halloween Fury 2	WEC 9: Cold Blooded

WEC 8: Halloween Fury 2 was a mixed martial arts event promoted by World Extreme Cagefighting on October 17, 2003, at the Palace Indian Gaming Center in Lemoore, California. The main event saw Cole Escovedo defend the WEC Featherweight title against Anthony Hamlett.

== Results ==
Main Card
Weight class				Method	Round	Time	Notes
Featherweight	Cole Escovedo (c)	def.	Anthony Hamlett	TKO (Punches)	2	1:30	(Note: For the WEC Featherweight Championship.)
Heavyweight	Mike Kyle	def.	Jerry Vrbanovic	KO (Punches)	1	0:12
Welterweight	Shonie Carter	def.	J.T. Taylor	Decision (Unanimous)	3	5:00	(Note: For the WEC Welterweight Championship.)
Heavyweight	Doug Marshall	def.	Anthony Fuller	TKO (Submission to punches)	1	0:32
Welterweight	Tom Owens	def.	Tony Alanis	Submission (Triangle Armbar)	1	1:49
Middleweight	Chris Leben	def.	Brian Sleeman	Submission (Armbar)	1	3:15
Lightweight	Poppies Martinez	def.	AJ Wieman	Submission (Rear-Naked Choke)	1	2:01
Middleweight	Fernando Gonzalez	def.	Mike Castillo	TKO (Punches)	1	1:27
Light Heavyweight	Sean Liddell	def.	Chris Saunders	TKO (Corner Stoppage)	1	5:00
Welterweight	Ryan Schultz	def.	Hannibal Adofo	KO (Punch)	1	0:25
Lightweight	Olaf Alfonso	def.	Randy Bowers	Submission (Armbar)	1	3:05
Welterweight	Jason Von Flue	def.	Chris Irvine	Submission (Arm-Triangle Choke)	1	2:04
Light Heavyweight	Richard Montoya	def.	Travis Stuart	Submission (Standing-Guillotine Choke)	1	0:38

== See also ==
- World Extreme Cagefighting
- List of WEC champions
- List of WEC events
- 2003 in WEC
