= J. T. Taylor =

J. T. Taylor may refer to:

- J. T. Taylor (American football) (born 1956), former American football offensive tackle
- J. T. Taylor (fighter), American mixed martial artist
- James "J.T." Taylor (born 1953), American singer and actor
