= WEC 19 =

WEC MMA events in 2006

WEC 19: Undisputed
- Promotion: World Extreme Cagefighting
- Date: March 17, 2006
- Venue: Tachi Palace Hotel & Casino
- City: Lemoore, California

Event chronology
WEC 18: Unfinished Business	WEC 19: Undisputed	WEC 20: Cinco de Mayhem

WEC 19: Undisputed was a mixed martial arts event held by World Extreme Cagefighting on March 17, 2006 at the Tachi Palace Hotel & Casino in Lemoore, California. The event aired live on the HDNet Fights.

Eight past, present, or future WEC champions competed at this event, which was the most ever featured on a WEC card.

== Results ==
Main Card
Weight class				Method	Round	Time	Notes
Featherweight	Urijah Faber	def.	Cole Escovedo (c)	TKO (Corner Stoppage)	2	5:00	(Note: For the WEC Featherweight Championship.)
Light Heavyweight	Tim McKenzie	def.	Doug Marshall	TKO (Punches and Elbows)	1	3:35
Catchweight (175 lb)	Joe Martin	def.	Tony Alanis	Submission (Heel Hook)	2	2:26
Light Heavyweight	Lodune Sincaid	def.	James Irvin	Decision (Unanimous)	3	5:00
Bantamweight	Antonio Banuelos	def.	James Cottrell	Decision (Unanimous)	3	5:00
Undercard bouts (aired on HDNet)
Lightweight	Hermes Franca	def.	Gabe Ruediger (c)	TKO (Punches)	1	0:36	(Note: For the WEC Lightweight Championship.)
Lightweight	Rob McCullough	def.	Olaf Alfonso	KO (Punch)	2	0:12
Welterweight	Pat Healy	def.	Tiki Ghosn	TKO (Shoulder Injury)	3	0:25
Lightweight	Ryan Healy	def.	Phillip Wyman	Submission (Rear-Naked Choke)	1	3:18
Heavyweight	Jake O'Brien	def.	Jay White	KO (Punch)	1	0:14
Middleweight	Kenny Ento	def.	Jimmy Dexter	Submission (Armbar)	1	1:20	(Note: This bout was not aired on the broadcast.)

== See also ==
- World Extreme Cagefighting
- List of World Extreme Cagefighting champions
- List of WEC events
- 2006 in WEC
