= WEC 1 =

WEC MMA events in 2001

WEC 1: Princes of Pain
- Promotion: World Extreme Cagefighting
- Date: June 30, 2001
- Venue: Tachi Palace Hotel & Casino
- City: Lemoore, California

Event chronology
WEC 1: Princes of Pain	WEC 2: Clash of the Titans

WEC 1: Princes of Pain was a mixed martial arts event held on June 30, 2001, at the Tachi Palace Hotel & Casino in Lemoore, California. WEC 1's main event was a fight between Dan Severn and Travis Fulton.

== Results ==
Main Card
Weight class				Method	Round	Time	Notes
Lightweight	Cruz Gomez	def.	Isaias Martinez	KO (elbows)	1	4:58
	Leonard Garcia	def.	Victor Estrada	KO (head kick)	2	0:54
	Nick Agallar	def.	Ray Benavides	TKO (punches)	2	4:29
	Chris Sanford	def.	Bobby Martin	KO (punch)	2	0:29
	Phil Ensminger	def.	Gabriel Garcia	TKO (punches)	1	0:59
	Scott Carson	def.	Bryson Haubrick	submission	1	2:20
	Tony Alanis	def.	Bryant Garcia	TKO (Submission to strikes)	1	1:33
	Lalo Moz	def.	Bruce Nelson	KO (punch)	1	0:08
	Gan McGee	def.	Seth Petruzelli	Submission (heel hook)	1	1:25
	Dan Severn	def.	Travis Fulton	unanimous decision	3	5:00

== See also ==
- World Extreme Cagefighting
- List of WEC champions
- List of WEC events
- 2001 in World Extreme Cagefighting
