= WEC 7 =

WEC MMA events in 2003

WEC 7 – This Time It's Personal
- Promotion: World Extreme Cagefighting
- Date: August 9, 2003
- Venue: Palace Indian Gaming Center
- City: Lemoore, California

Event chronology
WEC 6: Return of a Legend	WEC 7 – This Time It's Personal	WEC 8 – Halloween Fury 2

WEC 7: This Time It's Personal was a mixed martial arts event promoted by World Extreme Cagefighting on August 9, 2003, at the Palace Indian Gaming Center in Lemoore, California. In the main event, Ron Waterman fought James Nevarez to decide WEC's inaugural Super Heavyweight Champion.

== Results ==
Main Card
Weight class				Method	Round	Time	Notes
Super Heavyweight	Ron Waterman	def.	James Nevarez	TKO (Punches)	3	2:31	(Note: For the WEC Super Heavyweight Championship.)
Welterweight	Tony Alanis	def.	Don Rugebreght	Submission (Punches)	1	1:54
	Wander Braga	def.	Nick Ertl	Decision (Unanimous)	3	5:00
Welterweight	Shonie Carter	def.	Dax Bruce	Submission (Rear-Naked Choke)	1	2:28	(Note: For the WEC Welterweight Championship.)
Light Heavyweight	Boyd Ballard	vs.	Abraham Baxter	Draw	3	5:00
Lightweight	Olaf Alfonso	def.	Randy Spence	TKO (Punches)	2	4:34
Welterweight	J.T. Taylor	def.	Ryan Schultz	KO (Punches)	2	1:56
Welterweight	Jason Von Flue	def.	Nick Gilardi	Submission (Von Flue choke)	1	2:46
Heavyweight	Anthony Arria	def.	Levi Thornbrue	TKO (Punches)	1	1:29
Middleweight	Poppies Martinez	def.	Johnny Fadella	TKO (Knees)	1	0:51
Featherweight	Jorge Evangelista	def.	Gary Quan	TKO (Shoulder Injury)	1	4:26
Lightweight	Gabe Ruediger	def.	Carlos Cordero	TKO (Punches)	1	2:57
Middleweight	Michael Brown	def.	John Letters	Submission (Rear-Naked Choke)	1	0:54

== See also ==
- List of World Extreme Cagefighting champions
- List of WEC events
- 2003 in WEC
