= UFC 94 =

UFC mixed martial arts event in 2009

UFC 94: St-Pierre vs. Penn 2
- The poster for UFC 94: St-Pierre vs. Penn 2
- Promotion: Ultimate Fighting Championship
- Date: January 31, 2009
- Venue: MGM Grand Garden Arena
- City: Las Vegas, Nevada
- Attendance: 14,885
- Total gate: $4,290,020
- Buyrate: 920,000
- Total purse: $1,091,000

Event chronology
UFC 93: Franklin vs. Henderson	UFC 94: St-Pierre vs. Penn 2	UFC Fight Night: Lauzon vs. Stephens

UFC 94: St-Pierre vs. Penn 2 was a mixed martial arts (MMA) pay-per-view event promoted by the Ultimate Fighting Championship (UFC) on January 31, 2009. The card featured five televised MMA bouts, as well as five un-aired preliminary bouts. It was the second UFC event of 2009 and took place on the weekend of Super Bowl XLIII.

The main event featured the UFC Welterweight Champion, Georges St-Pierre, defending his title against UFC Lightweight Champion and former UFC Welterweight Champion B.J. Penn. This represented the first time two current titleholders competed against each other in the UFC. The contest was heavily promoted, featuring a publicity tour to Canada and Hawaii, as well as the introduction of UFC Primetime, a preview show that cost $1.7 million to produce. The co-main event of the evening was a battle between two undefeated light heavyweights sporting 13–0 records in Lyoto Machida and Thiago Silva.

== Background ==
The main event featured the UFC Welterweight Champion Georges St-Pierre defending his championship against UFC Lightweight Champion B.J. Penn in a fight contested at the UFC welterweight limit of 170 pounds (77.1 kg). The fight represented the first time two current title holders faced off in the UFC. Penn also sought to become the first fighter in the UFC to concurrently hold two championships in two separate weight classes. The UFC 94 main event was met with a high level of anticipation from both the media and the fans. Sherdog called the fight between St-Pierre and Penn the most anticipated bout of 2009, and NBC Sports described it as one of the most anticipated fights in MMA history. In an article previewing the fight, Dave Meltzer discussed the over-usage of exaggerations to promote contests in combat sports, but argued that the January 31 match between St-Pierre and Penn was "one of the true epic matches in the history of the sport." The fans voiced their opinion in a poll conducted by Inside MMA, where 45 percent of the viewers voted the match up between St-Pierre and Penn as the most anticipated fight to take place between December and February. The poll also featured (in descending order according to the results) Fedor Emelianenko vs. Andrei Arlovski, Wanderlei Silva vs. Quinton Jackson, and Rich Franklin vs. Dan Henderson.

St-Pierre is a fighter with very strong wrestling, and trains with the Canadian Olympic team. His conditioning, strength and athleticism have also been identified as strong attributes. He became the undisputed UFC Welterweight Champion by winning the interim-championship against Matt Hughes at UFC 79, and successfully unifying the championship against Welterweight title holder Matt Serra at UFC 83 in Quebec, St-Pierre's home province. St-Pierre's fight prior to the UFC 94 event was a successful title defense against Jon Fitch at UFC 87 via unanimous decision, where he won every round on the judge's scorecards. Penn is a fighter noted for his outstanding jiu-jitsu, as he is the first non-Brazilian to win the World Jiu-Jitsu Championship at the black belt level. His other notable strengths include boxing, and wrestling/takedown defense. Penn captured the vacant UFC Lightweight Championship by defeating Joe Stevenson at UFC 80. The belt was vacant as a result of the California State Athletic Commission stripping then-champion Sean Sherk of the title for testing positive for anabolic steroid Nandrolone, or more commonly known as Decadurabolin, following a title defense. Penn entered the UFC 94 fight following a successful title defense as well, with a 3rd-round TKO of former champion Sean Sherk at UFC 84. St-Pierre and Penn had fought once before in a welterweight number one contenders match at UFC 58 on March 4, 2006, where St-Pierre won in a very evenly matched contest by split decision.

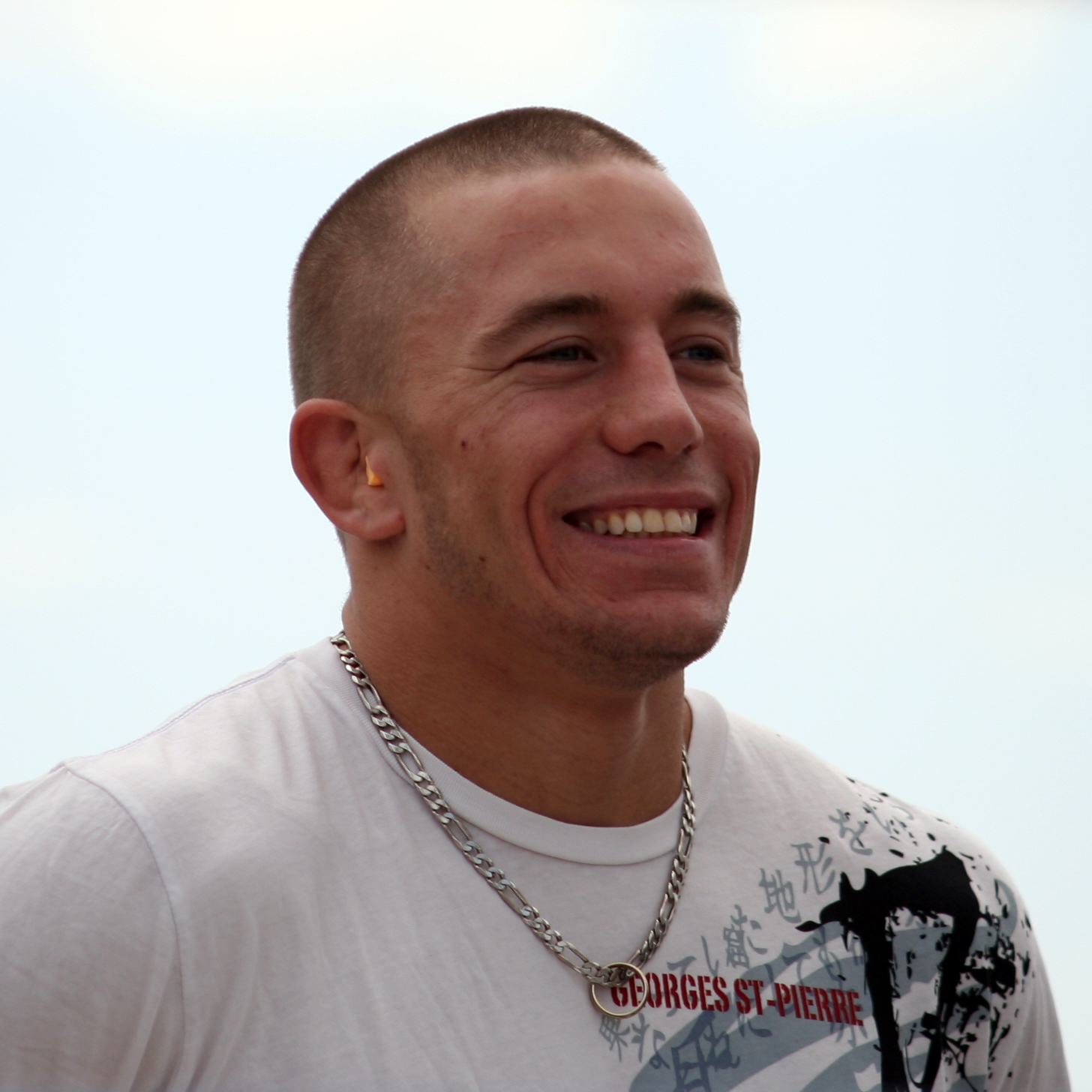
St-Pierre had defeated Penn in a previous bout; a split-decision at UFC 58.

Promotion for the St-Pierre and Penn contest began in November 2008, with UFC President Dana White, and the two main event fighters embarking on publicity tours in Toronto, Ontario, Canada and Honolulu, Hawaii. The fighters answered various fan questions, and signed autographs. In an effort to further promote the contest, the UFC introduced UFC Primetime, a three-part series that cost $1.7 million to produce. UFC Primetime detailed the final preparations of St-Pierre and Penn's before their fight. Spike aired the half-hour episodes on the final three Wednesdays leading up to the fight, beginning on January 14, 2009 and concluding on January 28, 2009. Camera crews spent twenty five days with each fighter rather than the three days for a standard UFC Countdown preview show, and episodes aired shortly after they were filmed. The episodes were aired quickly to provide weekly updates on each fighter's current status. After the first episode aired, it was reported by MMAjunkie.com that B.J. Penn was unhappy with his portrayal in the program, and wanted to withdraw from the project. Penn made a subsequent appearance on TapouT radio to discuss this report and confirmed that he has taken issue with his portrayal on the show. He was adamant that he would not continue to allow filming unless his portrayal changed. In the end, UFC Primetime proved to be a ratings success, as it was announced by Spike that the program was the most watched UFC preview show ever, drawing 1.4 million viewers for its first episode (880,000 viewers for first airing and 614,000 viewers for an immediate repeat). The second episode averaged 825,000 viewers, while the third episode drew 662,000 viewers.

The co-main event featured a bout between two top contenders and undefeated light heavyweights, Lyoto Machida and Thiago Silva. The two were originally scheduled to meet at UFC 89, but a back injury forced Silva to withdraw from the contest. UFC President Dana White indicated in the pre-fight press conference that Machida would receive a title shot with a victory, while Silva would need to defeat Machida and win one more contest before earning the same opportunity. Machida is a fighter who prefers to counter-strike, and combines Shotokan Karate, sumo wrestling and Brazilian jiu-jitsu to form his own style. Silva is a Brazilian jiu-jitsu black belt, but prefers to fight standing. Machida entered the UFC 94 fight following a unanimous decision victory over former UFC Light Heavyweight Champion Tito Ortiz at UFC 84, where he won every round on the judge's scorecards. Thiago Silva entered the contest with 1st-round TKOs over Antonio Mendes at UFC 84, and Houston Alexander at UFC 78.

The event also featured the return of two more fighters from injury, in Karo Parisyan and Stephan Bonnar. Parisyan, a judo standout, had to withdraw from a scheduled fight against Yoshiyuki Yoshida at UFC 88 with a back injury just one day before the fight. His opponent for UFC 94 was undefeated South Korean welterweight Dong Hyun Kim. Bonnar, a light heavyweight, was to take on Matt Hamill at UFC Fight Night 13, but a left knee injury during training forced him out of that bout. His opponent, the 21-year-old Jon Jones was a national amateur wrestling champion and coming off a unanimous decision victory over Andre Gusmão at UFC 87, where he took the fight on three weeks notice. Rounding out the main card was a lightweight contest between the winner of the fifth season of the UFC's reality television series and MMA competition The Ultimate Fighter, Nate Diaz, and contender Clay Guida. The Ultimate Fighter is a single-elimination reality series featuring fledgling professional MMA fighters competing for the title of The Ultimate Fighter, and a six-figure, multi-fight contract with the UFC. Diaz is a Brazilian jiu-jitsu brown belt under Cesar Gracie, and Guida is noted by MMA journalist Sam Caplan as one of the UFC's most highly regarded fighters. The two were expected to fight in December 2008, but the fight failed to materialize due to a foot injury to Guida.

== Event ==
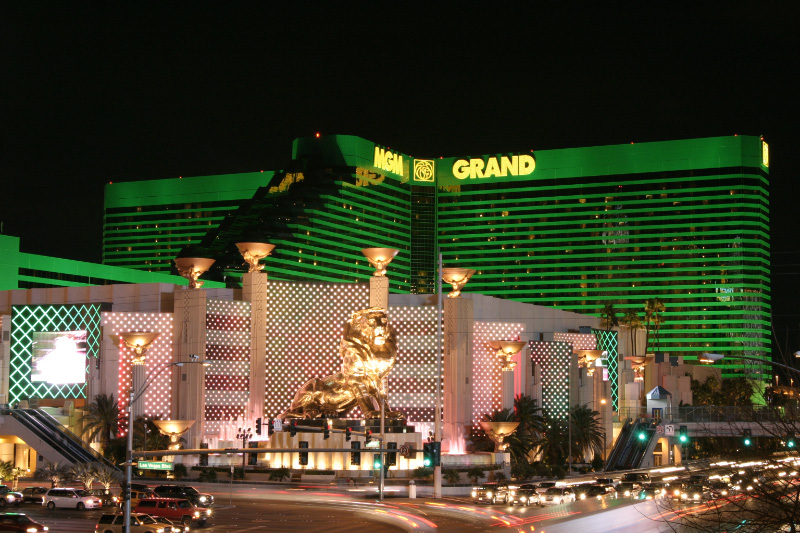
14,885 fans filled the MGM Grand Garden Arena to capacity to witness UFC 94 and the rematch between St-Pierre and Penn.

The card consisted of ten mixed martial arts bouts all sanctioned by the Nevada State Athletic Commission and contested under the Unified Rules of Mixed Martial Arts. All bouts consisted of three five-minute rounds except for the main-event championship match between St-Pierre and Penn which was five five-minute rounds. Five of the bouts were part of the non-televised preliminary card. The reported attendance was 14,885 with a total gate of $4,290,020. The UFC announced on January 14, 2009 that the event was completely sold out, however MMAjunkie.com noted that at the time of announcement, it was still possible to find single tickets. The reported buyrate of the pay-per-view was 800,000.

=== Preliminary card ===
The event's five preliminary fights all went the full three rounds, ending in decisions. In the first bout of the evening, Dan Cramer became the first fighter to be successful in a professional mixed martial arts debut at a UFC pay-per-view event since Marcio Cruz at UFC 55. In his fight with Matt Arroyo, Cramer executed a takedown and attempted punches on the ground while avoiding the Brazilian Jiu-Jitsu brown-belt's submissions during the first two rounds, while the third and final round saw Arroyo taking Cramer's back on the ground and unsuccessfully going for a rear naked choke. Two of the three judges scored the bout 29–28 for Cramer while the remaining third judge saw it 28–29 for Arroyo, giving Cramer the split-decision victory.

In the second bout of the event, Jake O'Brien rebounded from two TKO losses in a row with a split-decision win over Christian Wellisch. O'Brien, a former wrestler at Purdue University, was able to take Wellisch down and control his opponent on the ground but was hurt on the feet in the first and second rounds. The judges saw it 29–28, 28–29 and 29–28 in favor of O'Brien. This was both fighters first fight at light heavyweight after dropping down from heavyweight.

In one of the two bouts being awarded "Fight of the Night" bonuses, John Howard defeated Chris Wilson by split decision in their welterweight contest. Howard was able to take down Wilson in all three rounds where he scored with ground-and-pound and once went for a rear naked choke. Wilson had some success on his feet, but Howard landed the harder strikes. The contest was scored twice 29–28 for Howard and once 28–29 for Wilson.

The only lightweight bout on the preliminary card saw Thiago Tavares defeating Manny Gamburyan by unanimous decision. Tavares went for ground-and-pound after takedowns, while the smaller Gamburyan tried to push the pace on the feet but was unable to counter Tavares' more powerful strikes. All three judges scored it 29–28 in favor of Tavares.

In the last fight on the preliminary card, American Kickboxing Academy's Jon Fitch faced Akihiro Gono. The bout saw Fitch continually taking down Gono and landing with ground-and-pound punches on the downed opponent. Fitch came close to submitting Gono in the first and second rounds when he went for a rear naked choke and an armbar respectively, but he was unable to finish the Japanese fighter. All three judges scored the bout in favor of Fitch, two scoring it 30–27 with one judge seeing it 30–26 giving Fitch the unanimous decision victory.

=== Main card ===
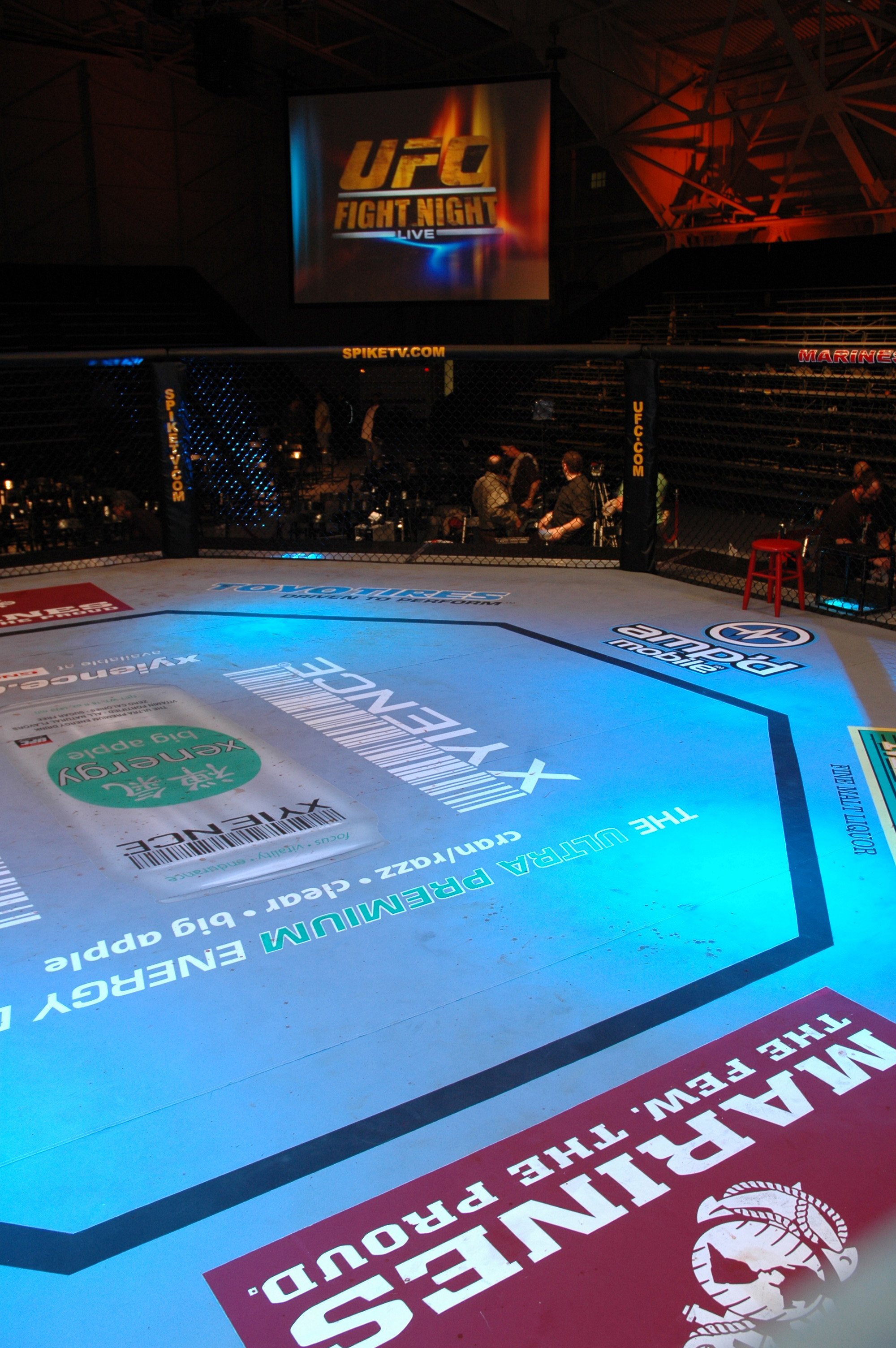
All fights took place inside a cage, the UFC's Octagon.

The first bout on the televised portion of the event saw Nate Diaz taking on Clay Guida in a lightweight contest. Diaz, who had an eight-inch reach advantage on Guida, was able to frustrate him with punches on the feet while Guida has success with leg-kicks followed by a right hand straight. After closing the distance, Guida used his wrestling experience to avoid submissions while controlling and pressuring Diaz both in the clinch and on the ground throughout the fight. Diaz rallied with punches in the final round but was unable to finish off Guida. The judges scored the bout 29–28 twice for Guida and once for Diaz for the split-decision victory. The bout was awarded the event's second "Fight of the Night" honor gaining both fighters a $65,000 bonus.

The second bout saw two judo black belts fighting as Karo Parisyan went up against undefeated Dong Hyun Kim in a matchup at welterweight. Kim took Parisyan's back in the first round and threatened with submissions as Parisyan attempted to regain position, while the second round saw Parisyian executing a judo-throw and going for a kimura-submission. The final round was mostly spent in the clinch with both fighters getting takedowns. Parisyian was awarded a split-decision victory with the scores 29–28, 28–29 and 29–28. However, the result was later changed to a "no contest" after Parisyian tested positive for three banned painkillers in the post-fight drug test also resulting in a nine months suspension and $32,000 fine.

Stephan Bonnar who returned to take on undefeated Jon Jones after just over a year absence.

In only his second fight for the UFC, Jon Jones took on The Ultimate Fighter 1 runner-up Stephan Bonnar at light heavyweight in the third fight on the main card. Jones was able to execute multiple throws and takedowns during the first two rounds, at one point suplexing Bonnar. Jones also had the most success striking and was able to knock down his opponent with a spinning elbow-strike. Bonnar rallied with strikes against the tiring Jones in the third round, but the bout went the distance with the judges scoring it 29–28 once and 30–27 twice all in favor of Jones.

The fourth fight featured two undefeated Brazilians meeting at light heavyweight in Lyoto Machida and Thiago Silva. Machida was able to knock down Silva twice during the first round before ultimately knocking him out after tripping him and jumping in landing the knockout punch at 4:59 of the first round. The finish marked the first win for Machida by knockout, and netted him a $65,000 bonus as it was awarded "Knockout of the Night".

The fifth and final bout of the main card was the UFC Welterweight Championship match between Georges St-Pierre and B.J. Penn, regulated by referee Herb Dean. The bout started out with the two fighters clinching and throwing knees. St-Pierre dropped down for a single-leg takedown but Penn defended while standing on one leg with his back to the cage. Unable to get the takedown, St-Pierre let go and connected with a right hand punch. They met up and clinched in the middle of the cage with St-Pierre pushing Penn towards the fence. There, St-Pierre attempted a takedown but went back the clinch when he was unable to finish it. The two fighters continued trading punches to end the first round.

Round two started with two fighters throwing strikes with St-Pierre landing a punch drawing blood from Penn's nose. St-Pierre then clinched up and tripped Penn to the ground. There Penn attempted to defend using the rubber guard, but St-Pierre passed to half-guard and eventually side-control while landing punches. The two continued grappling with Penn taking several ground-and-pound punches from St-Pierre until the round ended.

The third and fourth rounds saw St-Pierre continue his ground-and-pound on a visibly discouraged Penn, and at the end of the fourth, Penn's corner motioned for the cage-side doctor to stop the fight. The referee waved off the contest, officially declaring St-Pierre the winner, retaining his UFC Welterweight Championship, by TKO due to "referee stoppage on doctor's advice".

== St-Pierre greasing controversy ==
Cornerman Phil Nurse applying Vaseline to St-Pierre's face, and illegally touching his fighter's back.

The contest between St-Pierre and Penn was a source of significant controversy. In between rounds one and two, as well as round three, one of St-Pierre's cornermen, Phil Nurse, was seen applying petroleum jelly (brand name Vaseline) on the shoulder and the back of St-Pierre by members of the Nevada State Athletic Commission (NSAC). Vaseline is used to aid cuts in boxing as well as MMA, but applying it to parts of the body other than the face is illegal because of the element of grappling in the sport. A fighter that is "slippery" as a result of the vaseline will have an added advantage, because friction and grip are compromised. UFC President Dana White addressed the issue during a radio appearance in Boston, Massachusetts. He indicated that he did not believe the vaseline influenced the outcome of the fight, but still expected Nurse to be punished.

Penn's brother revealed two days after the bout that the Penn camp would be making a formal complaint to the NSAC. In addition, Penn's head coach, Rudy Valentino alleged that St-Pierre also had an illegal substance on his body during his April 2008 rematch with Matt Serra. NSAC Executive Director Keith Kizer confirmed that improprieties had occurred in St-Pierre's corner. He witnessed St-Pierre's cornerman Phil Nurse apply Vaseline to St-Pierre's face and then immediately rub St-Pierre's shoulders and back before Nurse wiped his hands. Kizer had St-Pierre's back wiped down after the second round, and confirmed after the third round that no Vaseline was being applied. Kizer was critical of the cornerman's action, but expressed doubts that the controversy would overturn St-Pierre's victory.

On March 12, 2009, B.J. Penn filed a formal request for investigation to the NSAC stating that St-Pierre used an illegal "greasing" agent on his body during the fight. The formal, written complaint consisted of twenty pages. It began by stating that "other renowned fighters" have also had similar experiences with St-Pierre, that his body was "unnaturally slippery." It continued by accounting an apparent "pre-bout warning" made by Penn's camp to the NSAC that St-Pierre will engage in the illegal application of vaseline. Next, a request to monitor St-Pierre and members of the team to prevent future misconduct was made, namely a monitored shower of St-Pierre and/or hygiene cleansing. The written statement concluded with Penn seeking fines against trainer Greg Jackson, Nurse, and "other unnamed individuals" of $250,000 each. In addition, that St-Pierre's license be suspended or revoked, and that the result of the bout be changed to a no-contest.

St-Pierre's trainer Greg Jackson denied any wrongdoing, stating that Nurse was rubbing and tapping on St-Pierre's body as part of a drill to aid in his breathing techniques. Jackson said that any Vaseline transferred from residue on Nurse's fingers was accidental and wiped off when pointed out. Georges St-Pierre spoke to Sports Illustrated with regard to the controversy stating, "I haven't seen the fight yet, but I remember at some point something happened and the athletic commission was complaining. They used a towel to wet my back and wipe it off. I don't mind. I didn't put Vaseline on myself and I'm not a cheater." However, St-Pierre offered Penn a rematch in the summer that Penn verbally accepted but both had scheduled title defenses and the bout never came to fruition.

On March 17, 2009, the NSAC held a formal hearing about the matter. Penn, his mother Lorraine Shin, and his attorney were present to make statements. Greg Jackson, Phil Nurse, and St-Pierre's attorney participated in the hearing as the opposing side. St-Pierre himself was not present. Shin read from a written statement, urging the NSAC to "do the right thing", and punish St-Pierre to the "fullest extent of authority." Jackson and Nurse apologized for the incident, but maintained that they did not knowingly cheat. At the hearing's conclusion, the NSAC Executive Director stated that St-Pierre's victory would not be changed to a no contest, nor would other sanctions, such as the loss of licenses be taken, unless a member of the NSAC files a disciplinary complaint against any of the accused. However, the committee left it ambiguous whether the matter was conclusively closed. Representatives from the Penn camp indicated that they were "unsure" of their next move.

== Subsequent events ==
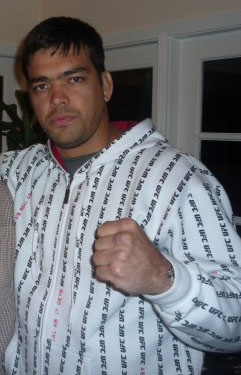
Lyoto Machida took Jackson's place at UFC 98 to challenge for the Light Heavyweight Championship.

Following the main event at UFC 94, top welterweight contender Thiago Alves made his way into the cage to congratulate St-Pierre on the victory. After interviews with both fighters, it was announced that Alves would be next to challenge for St-Pierre's championship. This fight took place as the co-main event of the UFC 100 card. St-Pierre's dominant victory also opened up discussion for a possible "superfight" with UFC Middleweight Champion Anderson Silva in 2010. Dana White stated that this bout was a possibility, and he would like to see it. St-Pierre expressed interest in the fight.

After Penn's loss to St-Pierre, reports surfaced that the UFC Lightweight Champion was contemplating retirement. However, during his first public appearance since the loss in Honolulu, Hawaii, he announced that he would continue to fight. He admitted that he was affected by the loss, and that "a lot of things were going through his head." In regards to his next bout, Penn stated that he was in negotiation to fight top contender Kenny Florian in the summer of 2009. Penn would go on and defeat Florian at UFC 101, winning in the fourth round by rear naked choke.

In the wake of the Vaseline controversy, the UFC responded by implementing immediate rule changes on February 7, 2009. These changes were discussed by longtime cutman Jacob "Stitch" Duran. According to Duran, under the new rules, only cutmen who are independent of both corners will be allowed to apply Vaseline to the fighter's faces. However, Duran was not able to confirm whether the rules will apply at all UFC events or just the events that take place in Nevada.

Despite Lyoto Machida's knockout of Thiago Silva, Dana White indicated that he was not the number one contender for a title shot. Instead, a scheduled fight between former UFC Light Heavyweight Champion Quinton Jackson and Keith Jardine would determine Machida's title fate. A victory for Jackson would earn him a fight with champion Rashad Evans, but a win for Jardine would mean Machida will be awarded with a title shot. Jackson won the fight via unanimous decision, but torn ligaments in his jaw forced the former champion out of the bout. Instead, Machida will challenge Evans for the UFC Light Heavyweight Championship at UFC 98. Jackson will retain his title shot against the winner of that match upon returning from injury. Following the loss to Machida, Thiago Silva was scheduled to return to action against former champion Forrest Griffin at UFC 101, but his opponent was later changed to Keith Jardine.

Karo Parisyan's next fight was to be against American Kickboxing Academy's Josh Koscheck at UFC 98. However, due to Parisyan's nine-month suspension from the NSAC for a failed drug test due to painkillers, the future of this fight is uncertain.

== Results ==
Main card (PPV)
Weight class				Method	Round	Time	Notes
Welterweight	Georges St-Pierre (c)	def.	B.J. Penn	TKO (corner stoppage)	4	5:00	(Note: For the UFC Welterweight Championship.)
Light Heavyweight	Lyoto Machida	def.	Thiago Silva	KO (punches)	1	4:59
Light Heavyweight	Jon Jones	def.	Stephan Bonnar	Decision (unanimous) (30–27, 29–28, 29–28)	3	5:00
Welterweight	Karo Parisyan	vs.	Dong Hyun Kim	No Contest (overturned)	3	5:00	(Note: Originally a split decision win for Parisyan; overturned after he tested positive for banned painkillers.)
Lightweight	Clay Guida	def.	Nate Diaz	Decision (split) (29–28, 28–29, 29–28)	3	5:00
Preliminary card
Welterweight	Jon Fitch	def.	Akihiro Gono	Decision (unanimous) (30–27, 30–27, 30–26)	3	5:00
Lightweight	Thiago Tavares	def.	Manny Gamburyan	Decision (unanimous) (29-28, 29-28, 29-28)	3	5:00
Welterweight	John Howard	def.	Chris Wilson	Decision (split) (29–28, 28–29, 29–28)	3	5:00
Light Heavyweight	Jake O'Brien	def.	Christian Wellisch	Decision (split) (28–29, 29–28, 29–28)	3	5:00
Welterweight	Dan Cramer	def.	Matt Arroyo	Decision (split) (29–28, 28–29, 29–28)	3	5:00

== Bonus awards ==
The following fighters received $65,000 bonuses.

- Fights of the Night: Clay Guida vs. Nate Diaz and John Howard vs. Chris Wilson
- Knockout of the Night: Lyoto Machida
- Submission of the Night: No bonus awarded.

== Reported payout ==
The following is the reported payout to the fighters as reported to the Nevada State Athletic Commission. It does not include sponsor money or "locker room" bonuses often given by the UFC.

- George St-Pierre ($400,000 – includes $200,000 win bonus) def. B.J. Penn ($125,000)
- Lyoto Machida ($120,000 – includes $60,000 win bonus) def. Thiago Silva ($29,000)
- Jon Jones ($14,000 – includes $7,000 win bonus) def. Stephan Bonnar ($22,000)
- Karo Parisyan ($80,000 – includes $40,000 win bonus) def. Dong Hyun Kim ($26,000)
- Clay Guida ($40,000 – includes $20,000 win bonus) def. Nate Diaz ($20,000)
- Jon Fitch ($68,000 – includes $34,000 win bonus) def. Akihiro Gono ($28,000)
- Thiago Tavares ($26,000 – includes $13,000 win bonus) def. Manny Gamburyan ($14,000)
- John Howard ($6,000 – includes $3,000 win bonus) def. Chris Wilson ($15,000)
- Dan Cramer ($16,000 – includes $8,000 win bonus) def. Matt Arroyo ($8,000)
- Jake O'Brien ($22,000 – includes $11,000 win bonus) def. Christian Wellisch ($12,000)

== See also ==
- Ultimate Fighting Championship
- List of UFC champions
- List of UFC events
- 2009 in UFC
