= Jake O'Brien (fighter) =

American mixed martial arts fighter

- Born: September 25, 1984 (age 42); Indianapolis, Indiana, U.S.
- Other names: Irish
- Height: 6 ft 3 in (1.91 m)
- Weight: 250.5 lb (114 kg; 17 st 13 lb)
- Division: Light Heavyweight; Heavyweight
- Fighting out of: Indianapolis, Indiana, United States
- Team: Integrated Fighting Academy
- Years active: 2005–2012

Mixed martial arts record
- Total: 19
- Wins: 15
- By knockout: 7
- By submission: 3
- By decision: 5
- Losses: 4
- By knockout: 2
- By submission: 2

Other information
- Mixed martial arts record from Sherdog

Jake O'Brien (born September 25, 1984) is an American retired professional mixed martial artist who most recently competed in the Heavyweight division. A professional competitor from 2005 until 2012, he fought for the UFC, WEC, and DREAM.

== Background ==
Born and raised in Indianapolis, Indiana, O'Brien attended Franklin Central High School where he competed in wrestling, football, and track and field. In wrestling, O'Brien was a three-time State Champion as a sophomore, junior, and senior, compiling an overall record of 152–9. O'Brien also earned four letters in football and one in track and field. O'Brien continued wrestling at Purdue University, and after redshirting his freshman year, posted a record of 14–18 in his sophomore season as the starting Heavyweight. However, this would be O'Brien's only year actively competing for Purdue (second overall year, including the redshirt season).

== Mixed martial arts career ==
=== Early career ===
O'Brien made his professional mixed martial arts debut in 2005 and compiled a professional record of 7-0 which included a 14-second knockout win in the WEC, before being signed by the UFC.

=== Ultimate Fighting Championship ===
O'Brien made his UFC debut at UFC Fight Night 6 on August 17, 2006, against Kristof Midoux and won via TKO in the second round. O'Brien followed this up with a unanimous decision victory at UFC 65 before facing Heath Herring at UFC Fight Night 8 on January 25, 2007. O'Brien picked up perhaps the biggest victory of his career, defeating the PRIDE veteran via unanimous decision (29–28, 30–27, 30–27).

In his next appearance, O'Brien faced former UFC Heavyweight Champion Andrei Arlovski and was handed his first professional loss via TKO in the second round. In his next fight, O'Brien was paired with future UFC Heavyweight Champion Cain Velasquez at UFC Fight Night: Silva vs. Irvin on July 19, 2008, and was defeated again via TKO, in the first round.

After two consecutive losses, O'Brien dropped down to the Light Heavyweight division and faced Christian Wellisch, who was also making his Light Heavyweight debut, at UFC 94 on January 31, 2009. O'Brien won via split decision. In his next appearance at UFC 100 on July 11, 2009, O'Brien faced future UFC Light Heavyweight Champion Jon Jones. O'Brien was defeated via guillotine choke submission in the second round.

=== Post-UFC ===
After his departure from the UFC, O'Brien won two fights in independent promotions before being signed by the Japanese promotion DREAM.

=== DREAM ===
O'Brien was expected to make his debut with the DREAM promotion on July 10 in a Light Heavyweight bout against former Strikeforce and DREAM Champion Gegard Mousasi at Dream 15. O'Brien failed to make weight, weighing in at 212 lbs therefore was given a 10% purse deduction as well as a yellow card at the start of the fight. O'Brien lost via guillotine choke submission in the first round.

== Championships and accomplishments ==
- Ultimate Fighting Championship
  - UFC.com Awards
    - 2007: Ranked #4 Upset of the Year vs. Heath Herring

== Mixed martial arts record ==
Professional record breakdown
19 matches	15 wins	4 losses
By knockout	7	2
By submission	3	2
By decision	5	0

Res.	Record	Opponent	Method	Event	Date	Round	Time	Location	Notes
Win	15–4	Miodrag Petkovic	Decision (unanimous)	Flawless FC 1: The Beginning	August 4, 2012	3	5:00	Chicago, Illinois, United States	
Win	14–4	James Shaw	Submission (arm-triangle choke)	Indy MMA	March 31, 2012	1	1:06	Indianapolis, Indiana, United States	
Loss	13–4	Gegard Mousasi	Submission (standing guillotine choke)	DREAM 15	July 10, 2010	1	0:31	Saitama, Japan	DREAM Light Heavyweight GP Semifinal; Catchweight bout (212 lb) due to O'Brien missing weight.
Win	13–3	Toni Valtonen	Decision (unanimous)	Fight Festival 27	March 13, 2010	3	5:00	Helsinki, Uusimaa, Finland	
Win	12–3	Dave Hess	Submission (kimura)	MMA Big Show: Triple Threat	February 20, 2010	2	4:24	Florence, Indiana, United States	
Loss	11–3	Jon Jones	Submission (guillotine choke)	UFC 100	July 11, 2009	2	2:43	Las Vegas, Nevada, United States	
Win	11–2	Christian Wellisch	Decision (split)	UFC 94	January 31, 2009	3	5:00	Las Vegas, Nevada, United States	Light Heavyweight debut.
Loss	10–2	Cain Velasquez	TKO (punches)	UFC Fight Night: Silva vs. Irvin	July 19, 2008	1	2:02	Las Vegas, Nevada, United States	
Loss	10–1	Andrei Arlovski	TKO (punches)	UFC 82	March 1, 2008	2	4:17	Columbus, Ohio, United States	
Win	10–0	Heath Herring	Decision (unanimous)	UFC Fight Night: Evans vs. Salmon	January 25, 2007	3	5:00	Hollywood, Florida, United States	
Win	9–0	Josh Schockman	Decision (unanimous)	UFC 65: Bad Intentions	November 18, 2006	3	5:00	Sacramento, California, United States	
Win	8–0	Kristof Midoux	TKO (referee stoppage)	UFC Fight Night: Sanchez vs. Parisyan	August 17, 2006	2	0:52	Las Vegas, Nevada, United States	
Win	7–0	Pat Harmon	Technical Submission (rear-naked choke)	UFL: United Fight League	June 23, 2006	1	3:46	Indianapolis, Indiana, United States	
Win	6–0	Antoine Hayes	TKO (punches)	LOF: Legends of Fighting 6	April 7, 2006	1	N/A	Indianapolis, Indiana, United States	
Win	5–0	Jay White	KO (punch)	WEC 19	March 17, 2006	1	0:14	Lemoore, California, United States	
Win	4–0	Johnathan Ivey	TKO (punches)	LOF: Legends of Fighting 4	January 20, 2006	1	N/A	Indianapolis, Indiana, United States	
Win	3–0	Anthony Ferguson	TKO (punches)	LOF: Revolution	January 7, 2006	1	N/A	Plainfield, Indiana, United States	
Win	2–0	Paul Bowers	TKO (punches)	IFC: Integrated Fighting Classic 3	June 21, 2005	1	N/A	Indianapolis, Indiana, United States	
Win	1–0	Chris Clark	TKO (referee stoppage)	MT: Madtown Throwdown 3	May 21, 2005	1	N/A	Madison, Wisconsin, United States	
