= WEC 4 =

WEC MMA events in 2002

WEC 4 – Rumble Under The Sun
- Promotion: World Extreme Cagefighting
- Date: August 31, 2002
- Venue: Mohegan Sun Casino
- City: Uncasville, Connecticut

Event chronology
| WEC 3: All or Nothing | WEC 4 – Rumble Under The Sun | WEC 5: Halloween Havoc |

WEC 4: Rumble Under The Sun was a mixed martial arts event held on August 31, 2002, at the Mohegan Sun Casino in Uncasville, Connecticut, USA. The main event was a fight between Aaron Brink and Jeremy Horn.

== Results ==
Main Card
| Weight class | | | | Method | Round | Time | Notes |
|---|---|---|---|---|---|---|---|
| Heavyweight | Jeremy Horn | def. | Aaron Brink | Submission (rear-naked choke) | 1 | 0:54 |
| Lightweight | Rich Crunkilton | def. | Luciano Oliveira | Submission (armbar) | 1 | 1:55 |
| Lightweight | Kurt Pellegrino | def. | Mac Danzig | Decision (unanimous) | 3 | 5:00 | (Note: For the Inaugural WEC Lightweight Championship.) |
| Middleweight | Tony Fryklund | def. | Zach Light | Submission (kimura) | 1 | 4:06 |
| Heavyweight | Christian Wellisch | def. | Jay White | TKO (punches) | 3 | 3:42 |
| Heavyweight | John Rallo | def. | Erik Mainiai | Submission (punches) | 1 | 3:06 |
| Light Heavyweight | Randy Rowe | def. | Jason Jones | DQ (punching after the bell) | 1 | 5:00 |
| Middleweight | Mike Swick | def. | James Gabert | Decision (unanimous) | 3 | 5:00 |
| Lightweight | Jeff Curran | def. | Bao Quach | Decision (majority) | 3 | 5:00 |

== See also ==
- World Extreme Cagefighting
- List of World Extreme Cagefighting champions
- List of WEC events
- 2002 in WEC
