= Phil Nurse =

English Muay Thai coach

- Born: Philip Nurse; Bolton, England, United Kingdom
- Height: 5 ft 7 in (1.70 m)
- Weight: 143 lb (65 kg; 10.2 st)
- Division: Welterweight
- Style: Kickboxing, Muay Thai

Professional boxing record
- Total: 17
- Wins: 14
- Losses: 3

Kickboxing record
- Total: 36
- Wins: 33
- By knockout: 15
- Losses: 3

Other information
- Boxing record from BoxRec

Phil Nurse is an English former Muay Thai kickboxer and an undefeated European Light Welterweight Champion, Double British Champion, and British All Styles Super Light Welterweight Champion. He is the owner and senior instructor at The Wat in Manhattan.

== Biography and career ==
Born in Northern England to Barbadian parents, Phil naturally became enamoured with Football. He was a very promising player until a leg injury forced him to seek other active ways to rehabilitate itself. At the age of 17, he began using Muay Thai aka Thai Boxing to strengthen his injury and found the sport addictive. He began his training with Sken Kaewpadung, who is largely credited with bringing Muay Thai to the UK. Through dedication and hard training, Phil rose through the ranks of Thai Boxing becoming European and British Welterweight Champion. Phil's record to date is 32–3 (15 KO). Though currently retired, he has held and never lost three title belts: European Light Welterweight Champion, Double British Champion, and British All Styles Super Light Welterweight Champion. Nurse has successfully defended both his European Light Welterweight and his British Super Light Welterweight Titles twice.

Nurse is also the inventor and developer of the Gravity Rope jump rope, a combination speed rope and weighted jump rope that allows users to perform cardio, speed, and agility training, while simultaneously performing upper-body strength and resistance training.

== Teaching career ==
While succeeding as a fighter, Phil also developed his teaching skills under the tutelage of Sken Kaewpadung. Eventually he earned the title of Kru (which means "teacher" in Thai), and received Sken Kaewpadung's blessing to open his first gym called Bury Thai Boxing. Years later while holidaying in New York City, Phil sought a gym to train in. Since there were no Thai Boxing gyms in New York City, Phil made his way to Gleason's Boxing Gym in Brooklyn. While training there curious people began asking him what martial art he was training in and where they could learn it. This set the ball in motion, and after returning to New York several more times; he opened a gym in New York in 1995. It was called Lug Sit Narong or "Student of Narong" Thai Boxing Gym. After experiencing exponential growth in New York. He realised that there was a huge demand for a larger space with premium services in a Thai setting. He then created the Wat (the Thai word for Temple) in China Town.

Nurse was the cutman involved in the UFC 94 greasing controversy when he applied vaseline to Georges St-Pierre.

On 17 May 2015, Nurse received the title of Ajarn or Master from Muay Thai Grandmaster Surachai "Chai" Sirisute.
