= List of WEC events =

WEC logo

This is a list of is of mixed martial arts events held by World Extreme Cagefighting. The first event, WEC 1, took place on June 30, 2001. The first event held under Zuffa management, WEC 25, took place on January 20, 2007. The final event, WEC 53, took place on December 16, 2010.

== Events ==
No.	Event	Date	Venue	Location	Attendance
53	WEC 53: Henderson vs. Pettis	December 16, 2010	Jobing.com Arena	Glendale, Arizona, U.S.	6,348
52	WEC 52: Faber vs. Mizugaki	November 11, 2010	The Pearl at The Palms	Las Vegas, Nevada, U.S.	
51	WEC 51: Aldo vs. Gamburyan	September 30, 2010	1stBank Center	Broomfield, Colorado, U.S.	3,791
50	WEC 50: Cruz vs. Benavidez	August 18, 2010	The Pearl at The Palms	Las Vegas, Nevada, U.S.	1,861
49	WEC 49: Varner vs. Shalorus	June 20, 2010	Rexall Place	Edmonton, Alberta, Canada	5,600
48	WEC 48: Aldo vs. Faber	April 24, 2010	ARCO Arena	Sacramento, California, U.S.	12,555
47	WEC 47: Bowles vs. Cruz	March 6, 2010	Nationwide Arena	Columbus, Ohio, U.S.	8,345
46	WEC 46: Varner vs. Henderson	January 10, 2010	ARCO Arena	Sacramento, California, U.S.	10,027
45	WEC 45: Cerrone vs. Ratcliff	December 19, 2009	The Pearl at The Palms	Las Vegas, Nevada, U.S.	1,741
44	WEC 44: Brown vs. Aldo	November 18, 2009	The Pearl at The Palms	Las Vegas, Nevada, U.S.	1,835
43	WEC 43: Cerrone vs. Henderson	October 10, 2009	AT&T Center	San Antonio, Texas, U.S.	5,176
42	WEC 42: Torres vs. Bowles	August 9, 2009	Hard Rock Hotel and Casino	Las Vegas, Nevada, U.S.	2,082
41	WEC 41: Brown vs. Faber II	June 7, 2009	ARCO Arena	Sacramento, California, U.S.	13,027
40	WEC 40: Torres vs. Mizugaki	April 5, 2009	UIC Pavilion	Chicago, Illinois, U.S.	5,257
39	WEC 39: Brown vs. Garcia	March 1, 2009	American Bank Center	Corpus Christi, Texas, U.S.	6,100
38	WEC 38: Varner vs. Cerrone	January 25, 2009	San Diego Sports Arena	San Diego, California, U.S.	10,201
37	WEC 37: Torres vs. Tapia	December 3, 2008	Hard Rock Hotel and Casino	Las Vegas, Nevada, U.S.	643
36	WEC 36: Faber vs. Brown	November 5, 2008	Seminole Hard Rock Hotel and Casino	Hollywood, Florida, U.S.	5,227
35	WEC 35: Condit vs. Miura	August 3, 2008	Hard Rock Hotel and Casino	Las Vegas, Nevada, U.S.	1,006
34	WEC 34: Faber vs. Pulver	June 1, 2008	ARCO Arena	Sacramento, California, U.S.	12,682
33	WEC 33: Marshall vs. Stann	March 26, 2008	Hard Rock Hotel and Casino	Las Vegas, Nevada, U.S.	
32	WEC 32: Condit vs. Prater	February 13, 2008	Santa Ana Star Center	Rio Rancho, New Mexico, U.S.	4,648
31	WEC 31: Faber vs. Curran	December 12, 2007	Hard Rock Hotel and Casino	Las Vegas, Nevada, U.S.	
30	WEC 30: McCullough vs. Crunkilton	September 5, 2007	Hard Rock Hotel and Casino	Las Vegas, Nevada, U.S.	
29	WEC 29: Condit vs. Larson	August 5, 2007	Hard Rock Hotel and Casino	Las Vegas, Nevada, U.S.	
28	WEC 28: Faber vs. Farrar	June 3, 2007	Hard Rock Hotel and Casino	Las Vegas, Nevada, U.S.	
27	WEC 27: Marshall vs. McElfresh	May 12, 2007	Hard Rock Hotel and Casino	Las Vegas, Nevada, U.S.	
26	WEC 26: Condit vs. Alessio	March 24, 2007	Hard Rock Hotel and Casino	Las Vegas, Nevada, U.S.	1,819
25	WEC 25: McCullough vs. Cope	January 20, 2007	Hard Rock Hotel and Casino	Las Vegas, Nevada, U.S.	
24	WEC 24: Full Force	October 12, 2006	Tachi Palace Hotel & Casino	Lemoore, California, U.S.	
23	WEC 23: Hot August Fights	August 17, 2006	Tachi Palace Hotel & Casino	Lemoore, California, U.S.	
22	WEC 22: The Hitman	July 8, 2006	Tachi Palace Hotel & Casino	Lemoore, California, U.S.	
21	WEC 21: Tapout	June 15, 2006	San Manuel Indian Bingo and Casino	Highland, California, U.S.	
20	WEC 20: Cinco de Mayhem	May 5, 2006	Tachi Palace Hotel & Casino	Lemoore, California, U.S.	
19	WEC 19: Undisputed	March 17, 2006	Tachi Palace Hotel & Casino	Lemoore, California, U.S.	
18	WEC 18: Unfinished Business	January 13, 2006	Tachi Palace Hotel & Casino	Lemoore, California, U.S.	
17	WEC 17: Halloween Fury 4	October 14, 2005	Tachi Palace Hotel & Casino	Lemoore, California, U.S.	
16	WEC 16: Clash of the Titans 2	August 18, 2005	Tachi Palace Hotel & Casino	Lemoore, California, U.S.	
15	WEC 15: Judgment Day	May 19, 2005	Tachi Palace Hotel & Casino	Lemoore, California, U.S.	
14	WEC 14: Vengeance	March 17, 2005	Tachi Palace Hotel & Casino	Lemoore, California, U.S.	
13	WEC 13: Heavyweight Explosion	January 22, 2005	Tachi Palace Hotel & Casino	Lemoore, California, U.S.	
12	WEC 12: Halloween Fury 3	October 21, 2004	Tachi Palace Hotel & Casino	Lemoore, California, U.S.	
11	WEC 11: Evolution	August 20, 2004	Tachi Palace Hotel & Casino	Lemoore, California, U.S.	
10	WEC 10: Bragging Rights	May 21, 2004	Tachi Palace Hotel & Casino	Lemoore, California, U.S.	
9	WEC 9: Cold Blooded	January 16, 2004	Tachi Palace Hotel & Casino	Lemoore, California, U.S.	
8	WEC 8: Halloween Fury 2	October 17, 2003	Tachi Palace Hotel & Casino	Lemoore, California, U.S.	
7	WEC 7: This Time It's Personal	August 9, 2003	Tachi Palace Hotel & Casino	Lemoore, California, U.S.	
6	WEC 6: Return of a Legend	March 27, 2003	Tachi Palace Hotel & Casino	Lemoore, California, U.S.	
5	WEC 5: Halloween Havoc	October 18, 2002	Tachi Palace Hotel & Casino	Lemoore, California, U.S.	
4	WEC 4: Rumble Under the Sun	August 31, 2002	Mohegan Sun Arena	Uncasville, Connecticut, U.S.	
3	WEC 3: All or Nothing	June 7, 2002	Tachi Palace Hotel & Casino	Lemoore, California, U.S.	
2	WEC 2: Clash of the Titans	October 4, 2001	Tachi Palace Hotel & Casino	Lemoore, California, U.S.	
1	WEC 1: Princes of Pain	June 30, 2001	Tachi Palace Hotel & Casino	Lemoore, California, U.S.	

== Event locations ==
- Total event number: 53

These cities have hosted the following numbers of WEC events as of WEC 53: Henderson vs. Pettis:

- United States (52)

Lemoore, California – 22
Las Vegas, Nevada – 15
Sacramento, California – 4
Glendale, Arizona - 1
Highland, California – 1
San Diego, California – 1
Broomfield, Colorado – 1
Uncasville, Connecticut – 1
Hollywood, Florida – 1
Chicago, Illinois – 1
Rio Rancho, New Mexico – 1
Columbus, Ohio – 1
Corpus Christi, Texas - 1
San Antonio, Texas - 1

- Canada (1)

Edmonton, Alberta – 1

== See also ==
- List of UFC events
- List of PRIDE events
- List of Strikeforce events
- List of K-1 events
