= Jeff Curran =

American mixed martial arts fighter

- Born: September 2, 1977 (age 49); Crystal Lake, Illinois, U.S.
- Other names: Big Frog
- Height: 5 ft 6 in (1.68 m)
- Weight: 135 lb (61 kg; 9.6 st)
- Division: Flyweight; Bantamweight; Featherweight; Lightweight
- Reach: 69 in (175 cm)
- Stance: Orthodox
- Fighting out of: Crystal Lake, Illinois, U.S.
- Team: Team Curran
- Rank: Fifth degree black belt in Brazilian Jiu-Jitsu under Pedro Sauer
- Years active: 1998–2016

Professional boxing record
- Total: 5
- Wins: 2
- By knockout: 2
- Losses: 2
- Draws: 1

Mixed martial arts record
- Total: 55
- Wins: 36
- By knockout: 1
- By submission: 21
- By decision: 14
- Losses: 18
- By knockout: 3
- By submission: 3
- By decision: 12
- Draws: 1

Other information
- Notable relatives: Pat Curran, cousin
- Boxing record from BoxRec
- Mixed martial arts record from Sherdog

Jeff Curran (born September 2, 1977) is an American retired professional mixed martial artist. A professional competitor from 1998 to 2016, Curran fought at a number of different weight classes for a large number of promotions including Bellator, the UFC, Strikeforce, PRIDE Fighting Championships, WEC, IFL, the RFA, and KOTC.

== Background ==
Curran started his path towards mixed martial arts with Karate and Tae Kwon Do when he was five years old. Curran has trained for 16 years and has fought for 5 years. He began Wrestling in the fourth grade and did that until his freshman year when he began Brazilian Jiu-Jitsu. He graduated from Woodstock High School (Illinois) in 1995. Curran also says that as a teen he would box with his grandfather. Curran holds a rank of fourth-degree black belt under Pedro Sauer. Curran is also known as one of the most technical instructors in the Pedro Sauer Jiu-Jitsu Association.

Curran is president and head instructor of Curran Martial Arts Academy (CMA), and owner and promoter of Xtreme Fighting Organization. Curran appeared on the television series Tapout on Versus with fellow Team Curran pro fighter Matt Fiordirosa.

=== World Extreme Cagefighting ===
After fifteen victories in sixteen fights, Curran fought Urijah Faber for the WEC featherweight championship. Faber retained his title by defeating Curran via guillotine choke. Curran then lost a pair of unanimous decisions, first to former WEC Featherweight Champion Mike Brown and then his Bantamweight debut to Joseph Benavidez at WEC 40. His most recent WEC fight was against Takeya Mizugaki on August 9, 2009, WEC 42; he lost by a split decision, and was subsequently released from the promotion for good.

=== Independent promotions ===
After losing four consecutive fights in the WEC, it was announced on October 20, 2009, that Curran had signed a two-fight contract with North American promotion Strikeforce. He maintained that his ultimate goal was to return to the WEC, but was glad to still be able to fight on major cards for the time being. He made his debut for the organization as a part of the preliminary card on their November 7 event, Strikeforce: Fedor vs. Rogers, in Chicago, winning over Dustin Neace by submission in the first round. Curran later defeated Tomohiko Hori via unanimous decision at XFO 34. Curran went on to lose a unanimous decision to Bryan Goldsby in a non-tournament bantamweight bout at Bellator 14.

Curran announced that he will be featured in a documentary entitled "This is the Fight". It was expected to be released in early fall 2010. The film will be about his difficult road to try to make it back to the WEC after 4 consecutive losses to, at the time, top 5 fighters in his weight class.

Curran faced David Love at XFO 37 on December 4, 2010. Although breaking his right forearm towards the end of the fight, he won the fight by unanimous decision. He underwent surgery for the injury on New Year's Day 2011.

Curran was scheduled to headline XFO 39 on May 13 at the Sears Centre in Hoffman Estates, Illinois. He took on late replacement Billy Vaughan and won via unanimous decision.

=== UFC return ===
Curran in July 2011 signed a new multi-fight contract to return to the UFC. His first fight back was against Scott Jorgensen, who was ranked the No. 4 bantamweight in the world by MMAWeekly.com at the time that Curran returned to the promotion. Curran lost by unanimous decision.

Curran faced Johnny Eduardo on May 15, 2012, at UFC on Fuel TV: Korean Zombie vs. Poirier. He lost the bout via unanimous decision and was subsequently released from the promotion.

=== Resurrection Fighting Alliance ===
On April 29, 2013, it was announced that Resurrection Fighting Alliance (RFA) next card would headline Jeff Curran and Sergio Pettis for the inaugural RFA flyweight championship. However, in the days leading up to the event, Curran was forced out for personal reasons and was replaced by Dillard "Joe" Pegg.

On July 20, 2013, it was announced that Keoni Koch was injured and pulled from the main event of RFA 9; Curran was then set to face Pedro Munhoz at RFA 9 on August 16, 2013, in the main event for the RFA Bantamweight Championship. Curran lost the bout via split decision and announced his retirement.

=== Titan Fighting Championship ===
On January 28, 2014, it was announced that Curran would return from his retirement to fight for Titan Fighting Championship; he was to take on fellow UFC vet Iliarde Santos in April.

== Grappling career ==
Curran was scheduled to compete in a rematch against Urijah Faber under Combat Jiu-Jitsu rules at A1 Combat 21 on May 25, 2024. Curran withdrew from the match due to undisclosed reasons and was replaced by Jeff Glover.

== Personal life ==
Jeff and his wife Sarah have two sons. Jeff opened up his own gym facility in 2018, where he was coaching Felice Herrig for her comeback but was forced to close it in 2020 due to financial complications resulting from COVID-19.

== Championships and accomplishments ==
- Ironheart Crown
  - IHC Featherweight Championship (1 Time, First, Last)
- Shooto
  - Shooto Americas Lightweight Championship (1 Time)

== Mixed martial arts record ==
Professional record breakdown
55 matches	36 wins	18 losses
By knockout	1	3
By submission	21	3
By decision	14	12
Draws	1	

Res.	Record	Opponent	Method	Event	Date	Round	Time	Location	Notes
Loss	36–18–1	Raufeon Stots	Decision (unanimous)	VFC 53: Curran vs. Stots	November 23, 2016	3	5:00	Waterloo, Iowa, United States	
Loss	36–17–1	Melvin Blumer	KO (backfist)	RFA 24: Smith vs. Romero	March 6, 2015	1	4:58	Prior Lake, Minnesota, United States	
Loss	36–16–1	Pedro Munhoz	Decision (split)	RFA 9: Munhoz vs. Curran	August 16, 2013	5	5:00	Los Angeles, California, United States	For the RFA Bantamweight Championship.
Win	36–15–1	Josh Killion	Decision (unanimous)	Extreme Challenge 227	May 3, 2013	3	5:00	Bettendorf, Iowa, United States	Flyweight Debut.
Loss	35–15–1	Johnny Eduardo	Decision (unanimous)	UFC on Fuel TV: Korean Zombie vs. Poirier	May 15, 2012	3	5:00	Fairfax, Virginia, United States	
Loss	35–14–1	Scott Jorgensen	Decision (unanimous)	UFC 137	October 29, 2011	3	5:00	Las Vegas, Nevada, United States	
Win	35–13–1	Billy Vaughan	Decision (unanimous)	Xtreme Fighting Organization 39	May 13, 2011	3	5:00	Hoffman Estates, Illinois, United States	
Win	34–13–1	David Love	Decision (unanimous)	Xtreme Fighting Organization 37	December 4, 2010	3	5:00	Lakemoor, Illinois, United States	
Loss	33–13–1	Bryan Goldsby	Decision (unanimous)	Bellator 14	April 15, 2010	3	5:00	Chicago, Illinois, United States	Bantamweight bout.
Win	33–12–1	Tomohiko Hori	Decision (unanimous)	XFO 34: Curran vs. Hori	December 5, 2009	3	5:00	Lakemoor, Illinois, United States	
Win	32–12–1	Dustin Neace	Submission (rib injury)	Strikeforce: Fedor vs. Rogers	November 7, 2009	1	1:39	Hoffman Estates, Illinois, United States	Lightweight bout.
Loss	31–12–1	Takeya Mizugaki	Decision (split)	WEC 42	August 9, 2009	3	5:00	Las Vegas, Nevada, United States	
Loss	31–11–1	Joseph Benavidez	Decision (unanimous)	WEC 40	April 5, 2009	3	5:00	Chicago, Illinois, United States	Bantamweight debut.
Loss	31–10–1	Mike Brown	Decision (unanimous)	WEC 34: Faber vs. Pulver	June 1, 2008	3	5:00	Sacramento, California, United States	
Loss	31–9–1	Urijah Faber	Submission (guillotine choke)	WEC 31	December 12, 2007	2	4:34	Las Vegas, Nevada, United States	For WEC Featherweight Championship.
Win	31–8–1	Stephen Ledbetter	Decision (unanimous)	WEC 29	August 5, 2007	3	5:00	Las Vegas, Nevada, United States	
Win	30–8–1	John Mahlow	Decision (split)	KOTC: Damage Control	May 26, 2007	3	5:00	Chicago, Illinois, United States	Lightweight bout.
Win	29–8–1	Kevin English	Submission (guillotine choke)	IFL: Moline	April 7, 2007	2	1:12	Moline, Illinois, United States	
Win	28–8–1	Donny Walker	Submission (rear-naked choke)	KOTC: Hard Knocks	January 19, 2007	3	3:23	Rockford, Illinois, United States	
Win	27–8–1	Raphael Assunção	Decision (majority)	XFO 13: Operation Beatdown	November 11, 2006	3	5:00	Hoffman Estates, Illinois, United States	
Win	26–8–1	Wagnney Fabiano	Decision (split)	APEX: A Night of Champions	October 14, 2006	3	5:00	Gatineau, Quebec, Canada	
Loss	25–8–1	Hatsu Hioki	Decision (unanimous)	Pride - Bushido 12	August 26, 2006	2	5:00	Nagoya, Japan	
Win	25–7–1	Charles Bennett	Submission (armbar)	KOTC: Redemption on the River	February 17, 2006	1	3:23	Moline, Illinois, United States	
Win	24–7–1	Antonio Carvalho	Decision (majority)	IHC 9: Purgatory	November 19, 2005	3	5:00	Hammond, Indiana, United States	Won Shooto Americas Lightweight Championship
Win	23–7–1	Steve Kinnison	Submission (rear-naked choke)	XFO 6: Judgement Day	June 25, 2005	3	1:47	Lakemoor, Illinois, United States	
Win	22–7–1	Luke Spencer	Submission (rear-naked choke)	SuperBrawl 40	April 30, 2005	2	2:34	Honolulu, Hawaii, United States	
Win	21–7–1	David Douglas	Submission (rear-naked choke)	IFC: Eve Of Destruction	March 5, 2005	1	1:39	Salt Lake City, Utah, United States	
Win	20–7–1	Jason Dent	Decision (unanimous)	Xtreme Fighting Organization 3	October 2, 2004	3	5:00	McHenry, Illinois, United States	
Win	19–7–1	Masahiro Oishi	Technical Submission (guillotine choke)	Zst 6	September 12, 2004	1	0:44	Tokyo, Japan	
Win	18–7–1	Kimihito Nonaka	Submission (rear-naked choke)	SuperBrawl 35	April 16, 2004	3	4:35	Honolulu, Hawaii, United States	
Win	17–7–1	Dan Swift	Submission (triangle choke)	XFO 1: The Kickoff	March 14, 2004	3	0:44	Lake Geneva, Wisconsin, United States	
Loss	16–7–1	Matt Serra	Decision (unanimous)	UFC 46	January 31, 2004	3	5:00	Las Vegas, Nevada, United States	Lightweight bout.
Loss	16–6–1	Norifumi Yamamoto	Decision (unanimous)	SuperBrawl 29	May 9, 2003	3	5:00	Honolulu, Hawaii, United States	
Win	16–5–1	Todd Lally	Submission (triangle choke)	WFA 3: Level 3	November 23, 2002	1	4:49	Las Vegas, Nevada, United States	
Win	15–5–1	Ryan Ackerman	Decision (unanimous)	IHC 5: Tribulation	October 26, 2002	3	5:00	Hammond, Indiana, United States	Won IHC Featherweight Championship
Win	14–5–1	Baret Yoshida	KO (punch)	UCC Hawaii: Eruption in Hawaii	September 17, 2002	2	2:08	Honolulu, Hawaii, United States	
Win	13–5–1	Bao Quach	Decision (majority)	WEC 4	August 31, 2002	3	5:00	Uncasville, Connecticut, United States	
Loss	12–5–1	Ivan Menjivar	Decision (unanimous)	UCC 10: Battle for the Belts 2002	June 15, 2002	3	5:00	Hull, Quebec, Canada	
Win	12–4–1	Max Marin	Submission (triangle choke)	UA 1: The Genesis	January 27, 2002	2	3:46	Hammond, Indiana, United States	
Loss	11–4–1	Anthony Hamlett	KO (elbow)	HOOKnSHOOT: Kings 2	November 18, 2001	1	0:11	Evansville, Indiana, United States	For vacant HnS Featherweight Championship.
Draw	11–3–1	Ryoji Yoshizawa	Draw	HOOKnSHOOT: Quake	March 10, 2001	2	5:00	Evansville, Indiana, United States	
Win	11–3	Jamie Webb	Submission (punches)	Freestyle Combat Challenge 3	January 6, 2001	1	2:44	N/A	
Win	10–3	Tony DeDolph	Decision (split)	Extreme Challenge 31	March 24, 2000	3	5:00	Kenosha, Wisconsin, United States	
Win	9–3	Ron Matthews	Submission (triangle choke)	Bangkok Brawl	March 20, 2000	N/A	N/A	Chicago, Illinois, United States	
Win	8–3	Sam Wells	Submission (triangle choke)	Midwest Absolute Challenge	December 4, 1999	1	16:04	McHenry, Illinois, United States	
Loss	7–3	Phil Johns	Submission (strikes)	Cage Combat 4	September 26, 1999	1	0:31	Green Bay, Wisconsin, United States	
Win	7–2	Jeremy Bolt	Submission (triangle choke)	ECC: Extreme Combat Challenge	August 17, 1999	1	4:30	Illinois, United States	
Loss	6–2	Phil Johns	KO (punches)	HOOKnSHOOT: Rising	June 12, 1999	1	N/A	Evansville, Indiana, United States	
Win	6–1	Charles Barron	Submission (armbar)	Chicago Challenge 6	May 22, 1999	1	N/A	Chicago, Illinois, United States	
Win	5–1	Sam Wells	Decision	Freestyle Combat Challenge 1	April 19, 1999	1	15:00	N/A	
Win	4–1	Jeff Rick	Submission (rear-naked choke)	HOOKnSHOOT: Trial	January 30, 1999	1	0:44	Evansville, Indiana, United States	
Win	3–1	Larry Koneizka	Submission (armbar)	Chicago Challenge 5	November 1, 1998	1	N/A	Chicago, Illinois, United States	
Win	2–1	Jason Chambers	Submission (front choke)	Chicago Challenge 4	May 30, 1998	1	N/A	Chicago, Illinois, United States	
Win	1–1	Mike Haltom	Submission (armbar)	Extreme Challenge 17	April 11, 1998	1	2:58	Indianapolis, Indiana, United States	
Loss	0–1	Henry Matamoros	Submission	Extreme Challenge 13	January 16, 1998	1	11:13	Kenosha, Wisconsin, United States	

== Submission grappling record ==
1 Match, 1 Loss
Result	Rec.	Opponent	Method	Event	Division	Date	Location
Lose	0–1	(United States) Ryan Hall	Points	ADCC 2009	–66 kg	2009	Spain

== Professional boxing record ==
5 fights	2 wins	2 losses
By knockout	2	0
By decision	0	2
Draws	1	

No.	Result	Record	Opponent	Method	Round, time	Date	Location	Notes
5	Win	2–2–1	(Mexico) Miguel Angel Figueroa	TKO	3 (4), 1:38	Sep 19, 2008	(United States) Cicero Stadium, Cicero, Illinois	
4	Loss	1–2–1	(United States) Guadalupe Diaz	MD	4	May 11, 2007	(United States) Cicero Stadium, Cicero, Illinois	
3	Loss	1–1–1	(United States) Raul García	UD	4	Jul 21, 2006	(United States) Aragon Ballroom, Chicago, Illinois	
2	Draw	1–0–1	(Mexico) Emanuel Hernandez	PTS	6	Apr 21, 2006	(United States) Cicero Stadium, Cicero, Illinois	
1	Win	1–0	(United States) Alexis Rubin	TKO	4 (4), 2:31	Apr 20, 2005	(United States) Bourbon Street, Merrionette Park, Illinois	Professional debut

== See also ==
- List of Bellator MMA alumni
- List of mixed martial artists with professional boxing records
