= Christian Wellisch =

American mixed martial artist (born 1975)

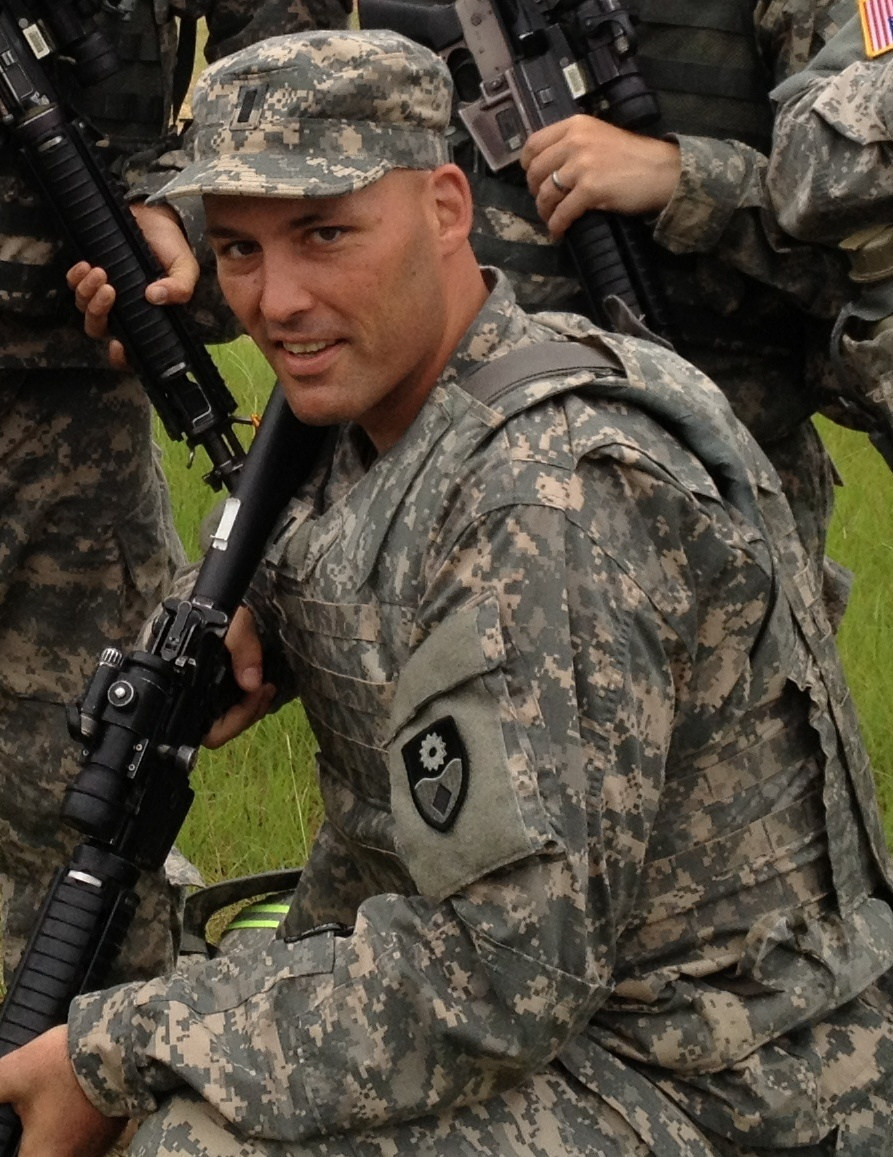
- Born: September 13, 1975 (age 51); Budapest, Hungary
- Nationality: Hungarian; American
- Height: 6 ft 2 in (1.88 m)
- Weight: 234 lb (106 kg; 16.7 st)
- Division: Heavyweight; Light Heavyweight
- Reach: 77.5 in (197 cm)
- Stance: Orthodox
- Fighting out of: Sacramento, California, United States
- Team: American Kickboxing Academy
- Years active: 2001-2009

Mixed martial arts record
- Total: 13
- Wins: 8
- By knockout: 4
- By submission: 3
- By decision: 1
- Losses: 5
- By knockout: 3
- By submission: 1
- By decision: 1

Other information
- Mixed martial arts record from Sherdog

Christian Wellisch (born September 13, 1975) is a Hungarian-American former professional mixed martial artist. A professional competitor from 2001 until 2009, he competed for the UFC, WEC, and King of the Cage. He was the first Hungarian fighter ever in the UFC.

== Early life ==
Christian Wellisch was born in Budapest in 1975, and lived in Hungary for 12 years. Because of the political repressions at the time, his parents decided to leave Hungary and moved to America so that he and his siblings could have better opportunities abroad. One such opportunity was the chance to start a career in MMA.

== Mixed martial arts career ==
Wellisch began his professional career in 2001 as a Heavyweight fighting in smaller promotions. In 2006, he scored a stoppage victory over the undefeated Dan Evensen. With a record of 6–2, Wellisch made his Ultimate Fighting Championship (UFC) debut against Cheick Kongo at UFC 62. He lost by knockout due to a knee strike in the first round. Wellisch followed up with two victories against Anthony Perosh and Scott Junk at UFC 66 and UFC 76 respectively. His streak ended at UFC 84, where undefeated rising star Shane Carwin knocked him out with a punch in 44 seconds of the first round, knocking his mouthguard out as well.

In November 2008, the UFC released Wellisch from his contract along with Jon Fitch and other American Kickboxing Academy (AKA) fighters as a result of a dispute over the exclusive license rights for a video game between AKA and UFC President Dana White. The dispute was resolved a day later and Wellisch, along with the other AKA fighters, were re-signed.

In his next appearance, Wellisch made his Light Heavyweight debut at UFC 94, where he lost to Jake O'Brien by split decision. With his second consecutive loss, and the UFC facing a glut of fighters due to recent acquisitions of WEC contracts, Wellisch was released from the UFC roster.

== Life after MMA ==
Having graduated from the McGeorge School of Law, Wellisch decided to retire from MMA and now runs his own law practice outside San Jose, California. Speaking on his decision to retire, Wellisch said "I told myself when I got into this sport that I wasn't going to take any steps backwards", he also said "I'm not going to go fight in the small shows, I think I made the right decision".

He enlisted in the California Army National Guard and currently holds the rank of Captain.

== Mixed martial arts record ==
Professional record breakdown
13 matches	8 wins	5 losses
By knockout	4	3
By submission	3	1
By decision	1	1

Res.	Record	Opponent	Method	Event	Date	Round	Time	Location	Notes
Loss	8–5	Jake O'Brien	Decision (split)	UFC 94	January 31, 2009	3	5:00	Las Vegas, Nevada, United States	Light Heavyweight debut.
Loss	8–4	Shane Carwin	KO (punch)	UFC 84	May 24, 2008	1	0:44	Las Vegas, Nevada, United States	
Win	8–3	Scott Junk	Submission (heel hook)	UFC 76	September 22, 2007	1	3:19	Anaheim, California, United States	
Win	7–3	Anthony Perosh	Decision (unanimous)	UFC 66: Liddell vs. Ortiz	December 30, 2006	3	5:00	Las Vegas, Nevada, United States	
Loss	6–3	Cheick Kongo	KO (knee)	UFC 62: Liddell vs. Sobral	August 26, 2006	1	2:51	Las Vegas, Nevada, United States	
Win	6–2	Dan Evensen	TKO (corner stoppage)	IFC: Caged Combat	April 1, 2006	2	5:00	Sacramento, California, United States	
Win	5–2	Tom Howard	Submission (rear-naked choke)	Valor Fighting: Showdown At Cache Creek	February 3, 2006	1	2:11	Brooks, California, United States	
Loss	4–2	Soa Palelei	TKO (punches)	Shooto Australia: NHB	February 12, 2004	2	4:33	Melbourne, Australia	
Win	4–1	Vince Lucero	TKO (punches)	CFM: Octogono Extremo	September 27, 2003	1	N/A	Monterrey, Mexico	
Loss	3–1	Kensuke Sasaki	Submission (guillotine choke)	X-1	September 6, 2003	1	2:35	Yokohama, Japan	
Win	3–0	Jay White	TKO (punches)	WEC 4	August 31, 2002	3	3:42	Uncasville, Connecticut, United States	
Win	2–0	Sam Sotello	Submission (rear-naked choke)	KOTC 16: Double Cross	August 2, 2002	1	4:20	San Jacinto, California, United States	
Win	1–0	Dennis Taddio	TKO (punches)	Shogun 1	December 15, 2001	1	1:23	Honolulu, Hawaii, United States	
