= Bao Quach =

American mixed martial arts fighter

- Born: September 4, 1979 (age 47); Huntington Beach, California, U.S.
- Other names: The Taz
- Height: 5 ft 3 in (1.60 m)
- Weight: 145 lb (66 kg; 10.4 st)
- Division: Featherweight
- Fighting out of: Irvine, California, U.S.
- Team: Rounders MMA
- Rank: Black belt in Brazilian Jiu-Jitsu
- Years active: 2001–present

Mixed martial arts record
- Total: 30
- Wins: 19
- By knockout: 5
- By submission: 4
- By decision: 10
- Losses: 10
- By knockout: 4
- By submission: 3
- By decision: 3
- Draws: 1

Other information
- Mixed martial arts record from Sherdog

Bao Quach (born September 4, 1979) is an American featherweight professional mixed martial artist who has fought for Bellator, Affliction, M-1 Global, EliteXC, Strikeforce, World Extreme Cagefighting, King of the Cage, and Shooto promotions.

== Background ==
Quach is originally from Huntington Beach, California, the son of Vietnamese parents, and attended Dana Hills High School where he excelled in wrestling and was a state qualifier. He continued wrestling at Cerritos College before earning a degree from Cal State Fullerton.

== Affliction: Day of Reckoning ==
Bao Quach agreed to step in for Mark Hominick to face LC Davis at Affliction: Day of Reckoning as Hominick was forced off due to contracting pneumonia. This was Bao's first fight since coming back from his injury which cancelled his 140 lb EliteXC Featherweight Championship fight with Wilson Reis back in September. Quach lost the fight via unanimous decision.

== Filmography and other media ==
Bao was featured in the video game “MMA Supremacy”

== Mixed martial arts record ==
Professional record breakdown
30 matches	19 wins	10 losses
By knockout	5	4
By submission	4	3
By decision	10	3
Draws	1	

Res.	Record	Opponent	Method	Event	Date	Round	Time	Location	Notes
Win	19–10–1	Alvin Cacdac	Submission (triangle/armbar)	M-1 Challenge 30: Zavurov vs. Enomoto	December 9, 2011	1	3:33	Costa Mesa, California, United States	
Win	18–10–1	Jeff Willingham	TKO (punches)	Lords of Combat – Lords of SoCal: Round 1	September 17, 2010	1	2:40	Irvine, California, United States	
Loss	17–10–1	Georgi Karakhanyan	KO (knee and punches)	Bellator 13	April 8, 2010	1	4:05	Hollywood, Florida, United States	
Win	17–9–1	Aaron Miller	Submission (armbar)	Respect in the Cage	September 20, 2009	2	1:44	Pico Rivera, California, United States	
Win	16–9–1	Tito Jones	Decision (unanimous)	Strikeforce Challengers: Evangelista vs. Aina	May 15, 2009	3	5:00	Fresno, California, United States	
Loss	15–9–1	LC Davis	Decision (unanimous)	Affliction: Day of Reckoning	Jan 24, 2009	3	5:00	Anaheim, California, United States	
Win	15–8–1	Mark Oshiro	Decision (unanimous)	ICON Sport: Hard Times	August 2, 2008	3	5:00	Honolulu, Hawaii, United States	Wins Icon Sport 140 lb North American Championship
Win	14–8–1	Armando Sanchez	Submission (kimura)	CXF: Uprising in Upland	June 14, 2008	1	0:50	Upland, California, United States	
Win	13–8–1	Doug Evans	TKO (punches)	ShoXC: Elite Challenger Series	April 5, 2008	1	0:55	Friant, California, United States	
Win	12–8–1	Bobby McMaster	Decision (unanimous)	ShoXC: Elite Challenger Series	January 25, 2008	3	5:00	Atlantic City, New Jersey, United States	
Win	11–8–1	Chris David	Decision (unanimous)	KOTC: Arch Rivals	October 27, 2007	3	5:00	Reno, Nevada, United States	
Win	10–8–1	Tenkei Fujimiya	Decision (split)	Shooto: The Arrival: This is Shooto	August 18, 2007	3	5:00	Irvine, California, United States	
Win	9–8–1	Del Hawkins	TKO (elbows)	IFO: Eastman vs. Kimmons	July 7, 2007	1	4:52	Las Vegas, Nevada, United States	
Win	8–8–1	Rex Payne	KO (punch)	No Limits: Proving Ground	April 21, 2007	1	1:34	Irvine, California, United States	
Win	7–8–1	Armando Sanchez	TKO (punches)	Invincible: Fist of Fury II	November 18, 2006	1	1:01	Ontario, California, United States	
Loss	6–8–1	Wagnney Fabiano	KO (head kick)	APEX: Evolution	June 10, 2006	1	4:50	Quebec, Canada	
Draw	6–7–1	Hatsu Hioki	Draw	Shooto: Gig Central 9	February 26, 2006	3	5:00	Aichi Prefecture, Japan	
Loss	6–7	Rumina Sato	Submission (armbar)	Shooto Hawaii: Souljah Fight Night	July 9, 2004	1	3:03	Honolulu, Hawaii, United States	
Loss	6–6	Hideki Kadowaki	Submission (rear naked choke)	Shooto - Year End Show 2003	December 14, 2003	3	4:40	Chiba, Japan	
Win	6–5	Cole Escovedo	Decision (split)	Gladiator Challenge 15	April 13, 2003	2	5:00	Porterville, California, United States	
Win	5–5	Naoya Uematsu	Decision (unanimous)	Shooto - Treasure Hunt 10	September 16, 2002	2	5:00	Kanagawa Prefecture, Japan	
Loss	4–5	Jeff Curran	Decision (majority)	WEC 4	August 31, 2002	3	5:00	Uncasville, Connecticut, United States	
Win	4–4	David Padilla	Decision (unanimous)	Warriors Quest 6: Best of the Best	August 3, 2002	2	5:00	Honolulu, Hawaii, United States	
Loss	3–4	Richard Crunkilton	KO (punches)	UA 2: The Gathering	March 16, 2002	2	1:20	Cabazon, California, United States	
Loss	3–3	David Yeung	Decision (majority)	Warriors Quest 3: Punishment in Paradise	December 1, 2001	2	5:00	Honolulu, Hawaii, United States	
Loss	3–2	Juliano Prado	Submission (choke)	GC 8: School Yard Brawls	November 17, 2001	3	3:01	Friant, California, United States	
Win	3–1	Kenny Tenorio	Submission (armbar)	KOTC 9: Showtime	June 23, 2001	1	2:54	San Jacinto, California, United States	
Loss	2–1	Greg Mayer	KO (punches)	KOTC 8: Bombs Away	April 29, 2001	1	0:17	Williams, California, United States	
Win	2–0	Dave Hisquierdo	Decision (unanimous)	GC 3: Showdown at Soboba	April 7, 2001	3	5:00	Friant, California, United States	
Win	1–0	Joe Camacho	Decision (split)	GC 2: Collision at Colusa	February 18, 2001	3	5:00	Friant, California, United States	

== See also ==
- List of male mixed martial artists
