= Gan McGee =

American MMA fighter

- Born: November 20, 1976 (age 49); Bismarck, North Dakota, U.S.
- Other names: The Giant
- Height: 6 ft 10 in (2.08 m)
- Weight: 260 lb (118 kg; 18 st 8 lb)
- Division: Heavyweight (265 lb); Super Heavyweight (265 lb+)
- Fighting out of: San Luis Obispo, California
- Team: The Pit
- Years active: 1999–2004, 2008–2009

Mixed martial arts record
- Total: 18
- Wins: 13
- By knockout: 11
- By submission: 1
- Unknown: 1
- Losses: 5
- By knockout: 3
- By submission: 1
- By decision: 1

Other information
- University: University of Iowa
- Mixed martial arts record from Sherdog

Gan McGee (born November 20, 1976) is an American mixed martial artist who has competed for the UFC, PRIDE, WEC and the XFC.

== Background ==
McGee was born in Bismarck, North Dakota to Marguerite McGee (nee Ohde) and Curtis Warren McGee. McGee dominated on the wrestling team at Ukiah High School and then continued his career at the University of Iowa and California Polytechnic State University.

== Career ==
McGee debuted with the UFC at UFC 28 on November 17, 2000. He faced fellow debutant Josh Barnett. He lost the fight via TKO in the second round.

McGee returned to the UFC in 2002 after a short stint in WEC where he won two fights.

His return fight was against Pedro Rizzo at UFC 39 on September 27, 2002. He won via TKO after Rizzo was unable to continue past the first round.

His next fight was against Alexandre Dantas at UFC 41 on February 28, 2003. He won via TKO in the first round.

On September 26, 2003, McGee earned a shot at the UFC Heavyweight Championship at UFC 44: Undisputed against 6 ft. 8 in. Tim Sylvia in a match that was dubbed "The Battle of the Giants." McGee lost this fight via TKO in the first round. After the fight, Tim Sylvia tested positive for steroids during a mandatory post-fight drug test and was stripped of his title. Even though his opponent was caught using performance-enhancing drugs, the UFC denied McGee a rematch for the championship. As a result, McGee lost his passion for fighting.

"Tim Sylvia is a great fighter and the video tape doesn't lie, he beat the hell out of me," said McGee from his San Luis Obispo training camp. "Did the steroids make a difference? Different people have different theories, I guess. But for me, what hurt the most was sacrificing absolutely everything I had to finally achieve my dream of becoming a world champion, and then falling short. And when it became clear that UFC wasn't going to consider me for a second title shot, my entire world collapsed. I felt like a part of me had just died. It was beyond devastating."

Gan McGee then left UFC and joined the Japan-based PRIDE MMA organization. He lost his two fights with the organization via decision and armbar. But, by his own admission, his heart was no longer in the fight game: "Culturally and personally, being in Japan was an amazing experience," McGee stated. "I mean, from the ceilings to the shower fixtures, everything is so small over there—I felt a little like Godzilla trampling the villagers. But professionally, I never really recovered from the Sylvia fight. Mentally, I lost that edge—that killer instinct. Call it the 'Eye of the Tiger' or whatever you want; I was just going through the motions, unfocused and uncaring. And after losing my second fight in the Orient, I swore to myself that I would never step foot (sic) in a steel cage again—not until I regain my warrior's mentality."

In 2008, McGee now claimed that he regained his long lost passion and embarked on a comeback that he hopes will culminate with the heavyweight world title. His first comeback fight was at Xtreme Fighting Championships#XFC 5: Return of the Giant on September 13, 2008, at the St. Pete Times Forum in Tampa, Florida. He won via second-round knockout. He said "It took years of introspection and self-discovery, but I finally realized that God made me a giant and blessed me with this mind-blowing power for a reason: to be the most destructive heavyweight champion that's ever walked on planet Earth," McGee stated. "Writers write, teachers teach -- and giants destroy. For so many years I tried to run away from my destiny -- to be something I'm not -- but that part of my life has come to a screeching halt. My intensity level is off the charts right now; if I've gotta tear down buildings, smash open skulls or annihilate whole cities to get another title shot, then that's what I'll do. This time around, 'The Giant' will stand tall."

He lost his last fight at Pure Combat 9 via KO (Punches) in the third round.

== Championships and Accomplishments ==
- International Fighting Championship
  - IFC Warriors Challenge 7 Tournament Winner

== Mixed martial arts record ==
Professional record breakdown
18 matches	13 wins	5 losses
By knockout	11	3
By submission	1	1
By decision	0	1
Unknown	1	0

Res.	Record	Opponent	Method	Event	Date	Round	Time	Location	Notes
Loss	13–5	Anthony Ruiz	KO (punches)	Pure Combat 9	July 25, 2009	3	1:14	Visalia, California, United States	
Win	13–4	Johnathan Ivey	TKO (punches)	XFC 5: Return of the Giant	September 13, 2008	2	0:59	Tampa, Florida, United States	
Loss	12–4	Semmy Schilt	Submission (armbar)	PRIDE Total Elimination 2004	April 25, 2004	1	5:02	Saitama, Japan	2004 PRIDE Heavyweight Grand Prix Opening Round.
Loss	12–3	Heath Herring	Decision (split)	PRIDE 27	February 1, 2004	3	5:00	Osaka, Japan	
Loss	12–2	Tim Sylvia	TKO (punches)	UFC 44	September 26, 2003	1	1:54	Las Vegas, Nevada, United States	For the UFC Heavyweight Championship. Sylvia later tested positive for steroids after the fight.
Win	12–1	Alexandre Dantas	TKO (punches)	UFC 41	February 28, 2003	1	4:49	Atlantic City, New Jersey, United States	
Win	11–1	Pedro Rizzo	TKO (corner stoppage)	UFC 39	September 27, 2002	1	5:00	Uncasville, Connecticut, United States	
Win	10–1	Ron Faircloth	TKO (punches)	WEC 2	October 4, 2001	1	0:12	Lemoore, California, United States	
Win	9–1	Seth Petruzelli	Submission (heel hook)	WEC 1	June 30, 2001	1	1:25	Lemoore, California, United States	
Win	8–1	Rocky Batastini	TKO (cut)	IFC WC 12: Warriors Challenge 12	April 11, 2001	1	3:12	Friant, California, United States	
Loss	7–1	Josh Barnett	TKO (punches)	UFC 28	November 17, 2000	2	4:34	Atlantic City, New Jersey, United States	
Win	7–0	Brad Gabriel	TKO (punches)	IFC: Battleground 2	September 30, 2000	1	N/A	Atlantic City, New Jersey, United States	
Win	6–0	Paul Buentello	TKO (submission to punches)	IFC WC 7: Warriors Challenge 7	May 3, 2000	1	2:44	Fresno, California, United States	Won the IFC WC 7 Tournament
Win	5–0	Tim Lajcik	TKO (submission to strikes)	IFC WC 7: Warriors Challenge 7	May 3, 2000	1	4:38	Fresno, California, United States	IFC WC 7 Tournament Semifinals
Win	4–0	Jason Jones	TKO (punches)	IFC WC 7: Warriors Challenge 7	May 3, 2000	1	6:48	Fresno, California, United States	IFC WC 7 Tournament First Round
Win	3–0	Aaron Brink	TKO (submission to punches)	CFF: The Cobra Challenge 1999	December 12, 1999	1	3:09	Anza, California, United States	
Win	2–0	Ricky Herro	N/A	IFC WC 5: Warriors Challenge 5	September 18, 1999	N/A	N/A	Fresno, California, United States	
Win	1–0	Sam Adkins	TKO (punches)	BRI 4: Bas Rutten Invitational 4	August 14, 1999	1	4:58	Littleton, Colorado, United States	

== See also ==
- List of male mixed martial artists
