= Chris Sanford =

American mixed martial arts fighter

- Born: Christopher Sanford; March 12, 1968 (age 58); Boston, Massachusetts, United States
- Nationality: American
- Height: 5 ft 11 in (1.80 m)
- Weight: 198 lb (90 kg; 14.1 st)
- Division: Light heavyweight (205 lb); Middleweight (185 lb)
- Fighting out of: San Francisco, California, United States
- Team: Cesar Gracie Jiu-Jitsu
- Years active: 2001–2005

Mixed martial arts record
- Total: 6
- Wins: 5
- By knockout: 1
- By submission: 4
- Losses: 1
- By knockout: 1

Other information
- University: University of Massachusetts, Amherst
- Mixed martial arts record from Sherdog

Chris Sanford (born March 12, 1968) is an American retired mixed martial artist who has competed in the Ultimate Fighting Championship and World Extreme Cagefighting. He appeared on the first season of The Ultimate Fighter.

== Background ==
Sanford was born in Roxbury, Boston. He lived in Japan as a high school exchange student and also studied Japanese language and economics at the University of Massachusetts, Amherst.

He practiced various forms of martial arts, like taekwondo, kung fu and boxing.

== Mixed martial arts career ==
=== Early career: World Extreme Cagefighting ===
Sanford started his mixed martial arts career in 2001. He fought mainly for California–based promotions as World Extreme Cagefighting and Gladiator Challenge.

He amassed a perfect record of four victories and no defeats before being signed to compete on the original season of The Ultimate Fighter.

=== The Ultimate Fighter ===
Sanford signed in to compete as a middleweight and was the last middleweight pick of Team Couture. However, he never fought on the show, as he was sent home by Couture in the second episode after his team lost the team challenges.

=== Ultimate Fighting Championship ===
Despite being eliminated early on the show, he was awarded a chance to fight at The Ultimate Fighter 1 Finale against fellow housemate Josh Koscheck. He was knocked out at 4:21 in the first round and was subsequently released from the promotion.

=== Return to WEC ===
Sanford faced Josh Green on August 18, 2005, at WEC 16. He won via submission due to a guillotine choke in the very first round.

Sanford never fought again since 2005.

== Mixed martial arts record ==
Professional record breakdown
6 matches	5 wins	1 loss
By knockout	1	1
By submission	4	0

Res.	Record	Opponent	Method	Event	Date	Round	Time	Location	Notes
Win	5–1	Josh Green	Submission (guillotine choke)	WEC 16: Clash of the Titans 2	August 18, 2005	1	2:30	Lemoore, California, United States	Light heavyweight bout.
Loss	4–1	Josh Koscheck	KO (punch)	The Ultimate Fighter 1 Finale	April 9, 2005	1	4:21	Las Vegas, Nevada, United States	Middleweight bout.
Win	4–0	Desi Miner	Submission (choke)	Fearless 1	July 5, 2003	1	N/A	Pasig, Metro Manila, Philippines	
Win	3–0	Jack Cardenas	Submission (armbar)	WEC 6: Return of a Legend	March 27, 2003	1	2:45	Lemoore, California, United States	
Win	2–0	Travis Robinson	Submission (heel hook)	Gladiator Challenge 6: Caged Beasts	September 9, 2001	1	1:54	Colusa, California, United States	
Win	1–0	Bobby Martin	KO (punch)	WEC 1: Princes of Pain	June 30, 2001	2	0:29	Lemoore, California, United States	
