= Cole Escovedo =

American mixed martial arts fighter

- Born: Coleman Ruben Escovedo; August 30, 1981 (age 45); Fresno, California, U.S.
- Other names: Apache Kid
- Height: 5 ft 7 in (1.70 m)
- Weight: 135 lb (61 kg; 9 st 9 lb)
- Division: Bantamweight; Featherweight; Lightweight
- Fighting out of: Fresno, California
- Team: Pacific Martial Arts
- Years active: 2001-2011

Mixed martial arts record
- Total: 26
- Wins: 17
- By knockout: 6
- By submission: 10
- By decision: 1
- Losses: 9
- By knockout: 4
- By submission: 1
- By decision: 4

Other information
- Mixed martial arts record from Sherdog

Coleman Ruben Escovedo (born August 30, 1981) is an American former mixed martial artist from Fresno, California. He was the inaugural WEC Featherweight Champion.

== Mixed martial arts career ==
=== Health issues ===
Escovedo was forced into a well-documented semi-retirement in 2007 from a serious staph infection that left him partially paralyzed and in need of spinal surgery. Then, after a nearly three-year hiatus from mixed martial arts action, he returned on May 8, 2009, at a Palace Fighting Championship event at the Tachi Palace Hotel and Casino in Lemoore, California. Escovedo's comeback to MMA was his first fight in the 135 lb Bantamweight division.

=== Ultimate Fighting Championship ===
Escovedo made his UFC debut against Renan Barão on May 25, 2011, at UFC 130. He lost the fight via unanimous decision.

Escovedo faced Takeya Mizugaki at UFC 135. He was knocked out by Mizugaki at 4:30 in the second round, giving him two consecutive losses in the UFC.

Escovedo faced Alex Caceres on November 12, 2011, at UFC on Fox 1. Escovedo lost via unanimous decision (30–27, 30–27, 30–27) after losing the standing exchanges to Caceres for all three rounds.

On December 16, 2011, Escovedo announced via the UG forums that he had been released by the UFC. Author Zac Robinson has written a book titled "Through The Cage Door" about Escovedo's life and career and its expected release date was August 2014.

== Championships and accomplishments ==
- Tachi Palace Fights
  - TPF Bantamweight Championship (One time)
- World Extreme Cagefighting
  - WEC Featherweight Championship (One time; First)
    - One successful title defense

IFC Champion 145

Tachi Palace Fights Native American Champion

== Mixed martial arts record ==
Professional record breakdown
31 matches	17 wins	14 losses
By knockout	6	4
By submission	10	1
By decision	1	9

Res.	Record	Opponent	Method	Event	Date	Round	Time	Location	Notes
Loss	17–9	Alex Caceres	Decision (unanimous)	UFC on Fox: Velasquez vs. Dos Santos	November 12, 2011	3	5:00	Anaheim, California, United States	
Loss	17–8	Takeya Mizugaki	TKO (punches)	UFC 135	September 24, 2011	2	4:30	Denver, Colorado, United States	
Loss	17–7	Renan Barão	Decision (unanimous)	UFC 130	May 28, 2011	3	5:00	Las Vegas, Nevada, United States	Bantamweight bout.
Win	17–6	Steven Siler	Technical Submission (triangle choke)	Showdown Fights: New Blood	January 28, 2011	1	2:30	Orem, Utah, United States	
Loss	16–6	Michihiro Omigawa	Submission (straight armbar)	Dream 16	September 25, 2010	1	2:30	Nagoya, Japan	Return to Featherweight.
Loss	16–5	Michael McDonald	KO (punches)	TPF 5: Stars and Strikes	July 9, 2010	2	1:12	Lemoore, California, United States	Lost the TPF Bantamweight Championship.
Win	16–4	Yoshiro Maeda	KO (head kick)	Dream 13	March 22, 2010	1	2:29	Yokohama, Japan	Featherweight bout.
Win	15–4	Jeff Bedard	Submission (triangle choke)	TPF 3: Champions Collide	February 4, 2010	1	2:31	Lemoore, California, United States	Won the TPF Bantamweight Championship.
Win	14–4	Maurice Eazel	TKO (head kick and punches)	Strikeforce Challengers: Gurgel vs. Evangelista	November 6, 2009	1	1:47	Fresno, California, United States	
Win	13–4	Tyler Weathers	Decision (split)	Disturbing the Peace	June 27, 2009	3	5:00	Fresno, California, United States	
Win	12–4	Michael McDonald	TKO (punches)	PFC 13: Validation	May 8, 2009	2	2:25	Lemoore, California, United States	
Loss	11–4	Antonio Banuelos	Decision (unanimous)	WEC 23: Hot August Fights	August 17, 2006	3	5:00	Lemoore, California, United States	
Loss	11–3	Jens Pulver	KO (punch)	International Fight League: Legends Championship 2006	April 29, 2006	1	0:56	Atlantic City, New Jersey, United States	Lightweight bout.
Loss	11–2	Urijah Faber	TKO (corner stoppage)	WEC 19	March 17, 2006	2	5:00	Lemoore, California, United States	Lost the WEC Featherweight Championship.
Win	11–1	Joe Martin	Submission (flying triangle choke)	WEC 17	October 14, 2005	1	1:05	Lemoore, California, United States	
Win	10–1	Poppies Martinez	TKO (leg injury)	WEC 15	May 19, 2005	2	1:05	Lemoore, California, United States	
Win	9–1	Randy Spence	Submission (triangle choke)	International Fighting Championships: Eve Of Destruction	March 5, 2005	1	2:06	Salt Lake City, Utah, United States	Won the IFC Featherweight Championship.
Win	8–1	Anthony Hamlett	TKO (punches)	WEC 8	October 17, 2003	2	1:30	Lemoore, California, United States	Defended the WEC Featherweight Championship.
Loss	7–1	Bao Quach	Decision (unanimous)	Gladiator Challenge 15	April 13, 2003	2	5:00	Porterville, California, United States	
Win	7–0	Noah Shinable	Submission (triangle choke)	Gladiator Challenge 14	February 16, 2003	1	1:38	Porterville, California, United States	
Win	6–0	Philip Perez	Submission (triangle choke)	WEC 5: Halloween Havoc	October 18, 2002	1	3:07	Lemoore, California, United States	Won the inaugural WEC Featherweight Championship.
Win	5–0	Christian Allen	TKO (punches)	Ultimate Athlete 3: Vengeance	August 10, 2002	2	3:16	Denver, Colorado, United States	
Win	4–0	Paul Morris	Submission (triangle choke)	WEC 3	June 7, 2002	1	0:29	Lemoore, California, United States	
Win	3–0	Jay Valencia	Submission (triangle choke)	Ultimate Athlete 2: The Gathering	March 16, 2002	1	0:45	Cabazon, California, United States	
Win	2–0	Bart Palaszewski	Submission (punches)	Ultimate Athlete 1: The Genesis	January 27, 2002	1	2:10	Hammond, Indiana, United States	
Win	1–0	Terry Dull	Submission (triangle choke)	WEC 2	October 4, 2001	1	1:54	Lemoore, California, United States	

New championship	1st WEC Featherweight Champion; October 18, 2002 - March 17, 2006	Succeeded by Urijah Faber
