= J. T. Taylor (fighter) =

American mixed martial artist

J.T. Taylor is an American mixed martial artist born in Oregon. Known as The General, he has fought notable fighters such as Shonie Carter, Rhonald Jhun, Chris Lytle, and Ryan Schultz. He fought a total of four times for the World Extreme Cagefighting organization. He recently wrestled to a draw in a Budofights event. Lyle Beerbohm called Taylor out, but the fight has yet to materialise.

== Mixed martial arts record ==
Professional record breakdown
15 matches	7 wins	7 losses
By knockout	1	5
By submission	4	1
By decision	2	1
Draws	1	

Res.	Record	Opponent	Method	Event	Date	Round	Time	Location	Notes
Loss	7-7 (1)	Eddy Ellis	KO (Punch to the Body)	UCS - Caged Combat 5	December 9, 2011	1	4:53		
Win	7-6 (1)	Erik Victor	Submission (Arm-Triangle Choke)	High Desert Brawl 39 - Superbrawl	September 10, 2011	1	2:46		
Win	6-6 (1)	Mike Dolce	Decision (Split)	UFO - Rumble at the Races	July 24, 2010	3	5:00		
Loss	5-6 (1)	Brandon Melendez	TKO (Punches)	Showdown Fights 1 - Burkman vs. Paul	April 9, 2010	2	3:31		
Win	5-5 (1)	Jory Erickson	Decision (Split)	CS - CageSport 8	December 5, 2009	3	5:00		
Win	4-5 (1)	John Heath	Submission (Guillotine Choke)	CCCF - Saturday Night Fights	October 10, 2009	2	2:36		
Loss	3-5 (1)	Nathan Coy	TKO (Punches)	CS - CageSport 6	July 25, 2009	1	3:39		
Win	3-4 (1)	Chris Ensley	Submission (Guillotine Choke)	DB - Desert Brawl 37	June 27, 2009	2	2:35		
Loss	2-4 (1)	Dave Culbertson	TKO (Doctor Stoppage)	DB - Desert Brawl 36	February 28, 2009	2	4:59		
Win	2-3 (1)	Drew Dimanlig	Submission (Armbar)	WEC 22: The Hitmen	July 28, 2006	1	3:47		
Loss	1-3 (1)	Chris Lytle	Submission (Forearm Choke)	WEC 12 - Halloween Fury 3	October 21, 2004	1	2:53		
Draw	1-2 (1)	Dennis Hallman	Draw	DB 9 - DesertBrawl 9	November 8, 2003	3	5:00		
Loss	1-2	Shonie Carter	Decision (Unanimous)	WEC 8 - Halloween Fury 2	October 17, 2003	3	5:00		
Win	1-1	Ryan Schultz	KO (Punches)	WEC 7: This Time It's Personal	August 9, 2003	2	1:56		
Loss	0-1	Ronald Jhun	TKO (Knees)	HC 2 - Hawaii Combat 2	March 1, 2001	2	0:33		
