= Anthony Hamlett =

American mixed martial arts fighter

- Born: Anthony Hamlett; October 1, 1973 (age 53)
- Other names: Icee
- Nationality: American
- Height: 5 ft 8 in (1.73 m)
- Weight: 145 lb (66 kg; 10.4 st)
- Division: Featherweight
- Style: Wrestling
- Team: Northwest Elite

Mixed martial arts record
- Total: 22
- Wins: 8
- By knockout: 5
- By submission: 1
- By decision: 2
- Losses: 14
- By knockout: 4
- By submission: 9
- By decision: 1

Other information
- Mixed martial arts record from Sherdog

Anthony Hamlett (born October 1, 1973) is an American mixed martial artist and fight promoter from Washington state. He is the head coach and manager of Northwest Elite Fight Team. He has also been a professional referee in the Northwest and referred the UFC. He has refereed over 3000 fights between amateur and pro. He is looked at as the top ref in MMA for the NW.

== Military service ==
Anthony Hamlett was in the US Air Force from March 1992- October 2000.

== Wrestling career ==
Anthony Hamlett in the USWF/USA WRESTLING ALL-AMERICANS A three time All American for the USAF team ranked as high as 5th in nation after world team trials

== Grappling career ==
ADCC Championships 2000 March 1, 2 & 3rd 2000 in Abu Dhabi, UAE the -65 kg class. Anthony Hamlett Defeated Hiroyuki Abe, and Joao Roque. Anthony suffered a loss to Royler Gracie and Joe Gilbert to place 4th at the Abu Dhabi World Championship after just one yr of pure grappling training coming over from wrestling

== Championships and accomplishments ==
- HOOKnSHOOT
  - Featherweight World Champion (One time)

== Mixed martial arts record ==
Professional record breakdown
| 22 matches | 8 wins | 14 losses |
| By knockout | 5 | 4 |
| By submission | 1 | 9 |
| By decision | 2 | 1 |

| Res. | Record | Opponent | Method | Event | Date | Round | Time | Location | Notes |
|---|---|---|---|---|---|---|---|---|---|
| Loss | 8–14 | Roy Bradshaw | Submission (guillotine choke) | COTC - Conquest of the Cage 14 | November 20, 2013 | 1 | 0:30 | Airway Heights, Washington, United States | |
| Loss | 8–13 | Ian Loveland | Submission (rear naked choke) | SF 14 - Resolution | January 6, 2006 | 1 | 1:04 | Portland, Oregon, United States | |
| Loss | 8–12 | Chris Mickle | Submission (punches) | FCC 18 - Freestyle Combat Challenge 18 | March 5, 2005 | 1 | N/A | Racine, Wisconsin, United States | |
| Loss | 8–11 | Chad Nelson | Submission (shoulder injury) | FCFF - Rumble at the Roseland 11 | January 24, 2004 | 1 | 3:43 | Portland, Oregon, United States | |
| Loss | 8–10 | Cole Escovedo | TKO (punches) | WEC 8: Halloween Fury 2 | October 17, 2003 | 2 | 1:30 | Lemoore, California, United States | |
| Loss | 8–9 | Brandon Bledsoe | Submission (armbar) | HOOKnSHOOT - Absolute Fighting Championships 3 | March 28, 2003 | 1 | 1:26 | Fort Lauderdale, Florida, United States | |
| Win | 8–8 | Steve Hallock | Decision (majority) | TFC 6 - Fightzone 6 | December 13, 2002 | 3 | 5:00 | Toledo, Ohio, United States | |
| Loss | 7–8 | Blake Fredrickson | TKO (injury) | WFF - World Freestyle Fighting 3 | October 25, 2002 | 1 | 2:16 | Vancouver, British Columbia, Canada | |
| Loss | 7–7 | Hermes Franca | TKO (punches) | HOOKnSHOOT - New Wind | September 7, 2002 | 1 | N/A | Evansville, Indiana, United States | Lost HnS Featherweight Championship. |
| Win | 7–6 | Caleb Mitchell | TKO (punches) | WEC 3 - All or Nothing | June 7, 2002 | 3 | 3:45 | Lemoore, California, United States | |
| Loss | 6–6 | Bobby Andrews | Submission (crucifix) | USMMA 1 - Ring of Fury | May 16, 2002 | 2 | 1:06 | Lowell, Massachusetts, United States | |
| Loss | 6–5 | Edson Diniz | Submission (punches) | WEF 11 - The Come Back | February 9, 2002 | 3 | 1:21 | Fort Lauderdale, Florida, United States | |
| Loss | 6–4 | Paul Gardner | Submission (kimura) | Rumble in the Ring 4 | December 1, 2001 | 1 | N/A | Auburn, Washington, United States | |
| Win | 6–3 | Jeff Curran | KO (elbow) | HOOKnSHOOT - Kings 2 | November 18, 2001 | 1 | 0:11 | Evansville, Indiana, United States | Won vacant HnS Featherweight Championship. |
| Win | 5–3 | David Guigui | TKO (strikes) | IFC WC 16 - Warriors Challenge 16 | November 9, 2001 | 3 | 3:10 | United States | |
| Loss | 4–3 | Jimmy Terrel | Decision | WEC 2: Clash of the Titans | October 4, 2001 | 3 | 5:00 | Lemoore, California, United States | |
| Win | 4–2 | Kevin Smith | TKO (injury) | RITR 3 - Rumble in the Ring 3 | August 25, 2001 | 2 | 0:35 | Auburn, Washington, United States | |
| Loss | 3–2 | Charlie Pearson | TKO (retirement) | AMC - Return of the Gladiators 2 | March 3, 2001 | 2 | 5:00 | Washington, United States | |
| Loss | 3–1 | Uchu Tatsumi | Submission (rear-naked choke) | Shooto - R.E.A.D 7 | July 22, 2000 | 1 | 2:49 | Tokyo, Japan | |
| Win | 3–0 | Tetsuo Katsuta | Decision (majority) | SB 15 - SuperBrawl 15 | December 7, 1999 | 2 | 5:00 | Honolulu, Hawaii, United States | |
| Win | 2–0 | Jeremy Bolt | Submission (rear naked choke) | HOOKnSHOOT - Beyond | September 10, 1999 | 1 | 11:02 | United States | |
| Win | 1–0 | David Velasquez | TKO (injury) | PPKA - Wenatchee | August 22, 1999 | N/A | | Wenatchee, Washington, United States | |
