= Tachi Palace =

Casino in California

Coordinates: 36.23693°N 119.76562°W

Tachi Palace Hotel & Casino

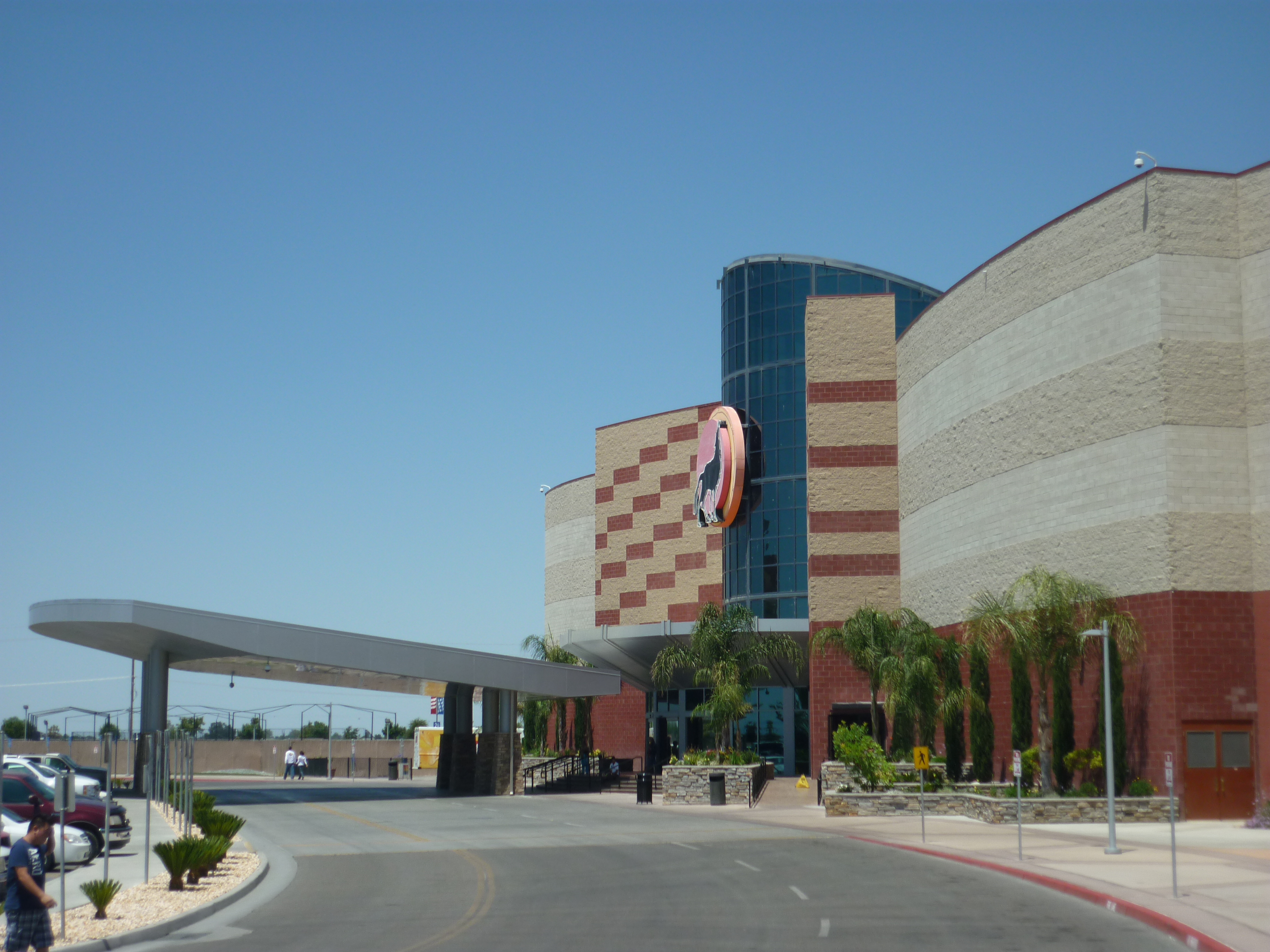
- Main entrance of the casino
- Interactive map of Tachi Palace Hotel & Casino
- Location: Lemoore, California; 17225 Jersey Avenue
- Opened: November 4, 1983
- No. of rooms: 255
- Casino type: Indian
- Owner: Santa Rosa Indian Community of the Santa Rosa Rancheria
- Previous names: Southgate Bingo Palace; Palace Indian Gaming Center
- Website: tachipalace.com

Tachi Palace Hotel & Casino is an Indian casino and hotel on the Santa Rosa Rancheria in Lemoore, California.

== History ==
The 1,100-seat Southgate Bingo Palace was built for $1 million by Paland, Inc. of Dallas, and opened on November 4, 1983. Within seven months, the construction costs had been recouped, and payments to tribal members began.

By 1986, when a $750,000 renovation was completed to make Southgate the "most luxurious bingo hall in the state", the hall was being operated by British-American Bingo, Inc., which received 45% of revenues, with the remainder going to the tribe. Tribal members also made up 20% of the hall's workforce. Revenues had grown to $5.3 million in 1987. The tribe put the money toward items including youth recreation programs, college scholarships and construction of homes.

In 1994, the tribe took over operation of the bingo hall and renamed it Palace Indian Gaming Center. The tribe soon added slot machines, which grew in number to 385 as of 1997, despite ongoing efforts by the state to block them. In 2005, a major expansion was opened, and it was renamed as Tachi Palace.

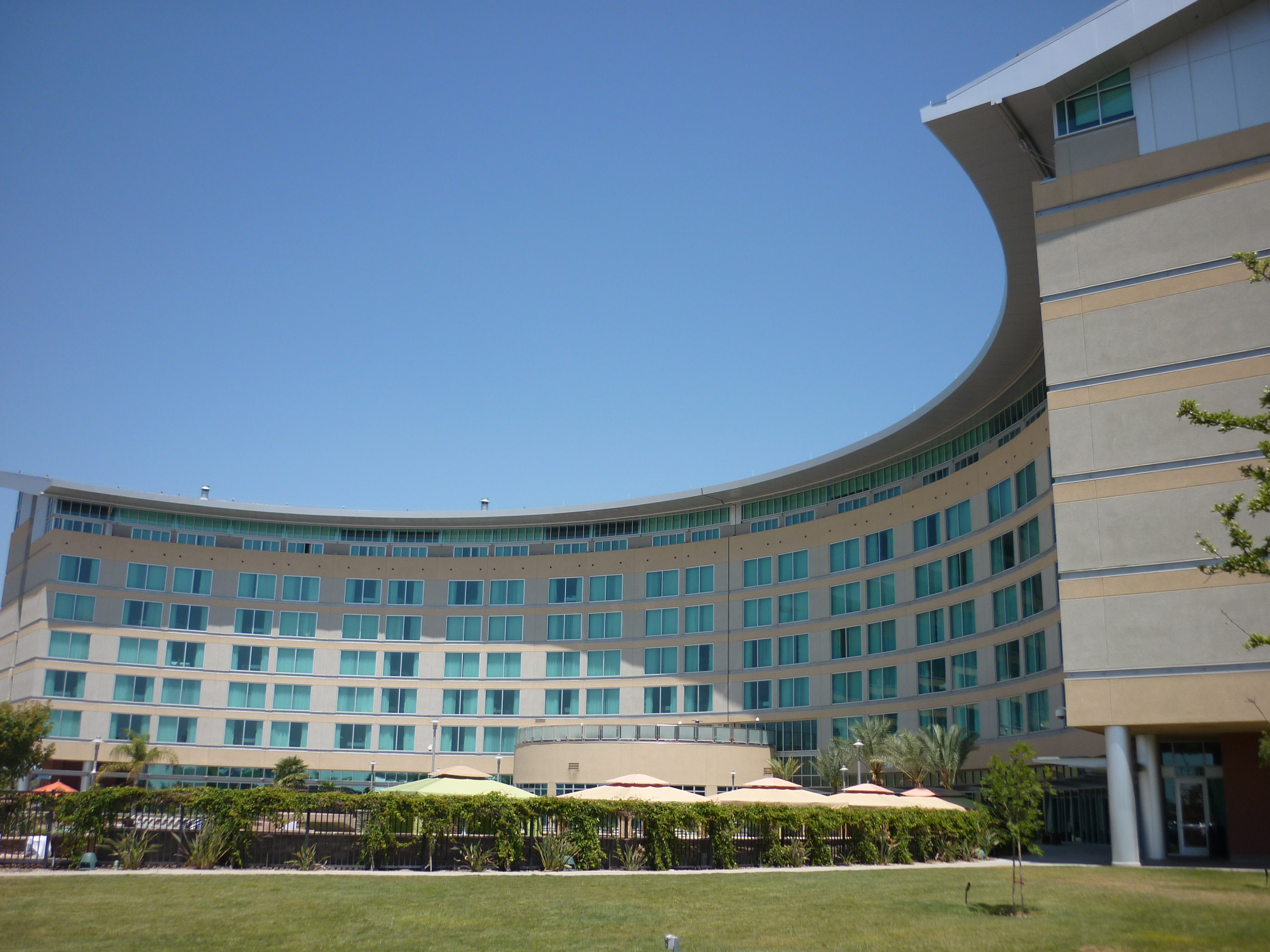
The seven-story Tachi Palace hotel

The following year, a 7-story, 255-room hotel was opened on the property. The hotel is semi-circular, with plans for a second phase of construction to complete the circle.

== Sporting events ==
World Extreme Cagefighting hosted 22 mixed martial arts events at Tachi Palace, until it was bought in 2006 by Zuffa, the parent company of the Ultimate Fighting Championship, and moved its events to Las Vegas. The casino's entertainment director, Christian Printup, then created a new MMA promotion, Palace Fighting Championship. After Printup departed in 2009, the casino formed a new promotion, Tachi Palace Fights, in conjunction with Gladiator Challenge. The tribal council decided to discontinue mixed martial arts events at the casino in December 2012, but reversed its decision in March 2013, and TPF fights resumed.

The cancelled UFC 249 was to have been held at Tachi Palace.

Tachi Palace has also hosted many boxing events in association with promoter Goossen-Tutor, and became especially known for its women's boxing bouts.
