= 2003 in UFC =

Mixed martial arts events

Information
- First date: Feb 28, 2003
- Last date: Nov 21, 2003

Events
- Total events: 5
- UFC: 5

Fights
- Total fights: 41
- Title fights: 6

Chronology
2002 in UFC	2003 in UFC	2004 in UFC

The year 2003 was the 11th year in the history of the Ultimate Fighting Championship (UFC), a mixed martial arts promotion based in the United States. In 2003, the UFC held five events beginning with UFC 41: Onslaught.

== Title fights ==
Title fights in 2003
Weight class				Method	Round	Time	Event	Notes
Welterweight	Matt Hughes (c)	def.	Frank Trigg	Submission (rear-naked choke)	1	3:54	UFC 45: Revolution	(Note: For the UFC Welterweight Championship.)
Heavyweight	Tim Sylvia (c)	def.	Gan McGee	KO (punches)	1	1:54	UFC 44: Undisputed	(Note: For the UFC Heavyweight Championship.)
Light Heavyweight	Randy Couture (ic)	def.	Tito Ortiz (c)	Decision (unanimous)	5	5:00	UFC 44: Undisputed	(Note: For the UFC Light Heavyweight Championship.)
Light Heavyweight	Randy Couture	def.	Chuck Liddell	TKO (punches)	3	2:39	UFC 43: Meltdown	(Note: For the UFC Light Heavyweight Championship. Couture won via TKO (punches) at 2:39 of Round 3. Couture becomes the Interim Light Heavyweight Champion, and the first person to win a title in two different weight divisions (Couture was a two-time Heavyweight Champion).)
Welterweight	Matt Hughes (c)	def.	Sean Sherk	Decision (unanimous)	5	5:00	UFC 42: Sudden Impact	(Note: For the UFC Welterweight Championship.)
Lightweight	B.J. Penn	vs.	Caol Uno	Draw	5	5:00	UFC 41: Onslaught	(Note: For the UFC Lightweight Championship. Penn and Uno fought to a split draw after five rounds. Judges scored the bout 48–47 Uno, 48–46 Penn, and 48–48. This match was the final match of a 4-man tournament that took place over several cards to crown a new lightweight champion, the first round occurred on UFC 39. Without a definite outcome, the title remained vacant and eventually put the Lightweight division on hiatus. The Lightweight championship would be contested once again at UFC 64 and since then has become a permanent fixture in the UFC.)
Heavyweight	Tim Sylvia	def.	Ricco Rodriguez (c)	TKO (punches)	1	3:09	UFC 41: Onslaught	(Note: For the UFC Heavyweight Championship.)

== Debut UFC fighters ==
The following fighters fought their first UFC fight in 2003:

ISO	Fighter	Division
(United States)	Chris Liguori	Lightweight
(United States)	Dave Strasser	Welterweight
(Canada)	David Loiseau	Middleweight
(United States)	Duane Ludwig	Welterweight
(United States)	Eddie Ruiz	Lightweight
(United States)	Edwin Dewees	Middleweight
(United States)	Falaniko Vitale	Middleweight
(United States)	Frank Trigg	Welterweight

ISO	Fighter	Division
(United States)	Gerald Strebendt	Lightweight
(Brazil)	Hermes Franca	Lightweight
(United States)	Jeremy Jackson	Welterweight
(United States)	Jorge Rivera	Middleweight
(United States)	Josh Thomson	Welterweight
(Armenia)	Karo Parisyan	Welterweight
(United States)	Marvin Eastman	Light Heavyweight
(United States)	Nick Agallar	Lightweight

ISO	Fighter	Division
(United States)	Nick Diaz	Welterweight
(United States)	Rich Clementi	Lightweight
(United States)	Rich Crunkilton	Lightweight
(United States)	Rich Franklin	Middleweight
(United States)	Romie Aram	Middleweight
(United States)	Sean Alvarez	Heavyweight
(United States)	Vernon White	Light Heavyweight
(United States)	Wes Sims	Heavyweight

== Events list ==
#	Event	Date	Venue	Location	Attendance
050	UFC 45: Revolution	Nov 21, 2003	Mohegan Sun Arena	Uncasville, Connecticut, U.S.	9,200
049	UFC 44: Undisputed	Sep 26, 2003	Mandalay Bay Events Center	Las Vegas, Nevada, U.S.	10,400
048	UFC 43: Meltdown	Jun 6, 2003	Thomas & Mack Center	Las Vegas, Nevada, U.S.	9,800
047	UFC 42: Sudden Impact	Apr 25, 2003	AmericanAirlines Arena	Miami, Florida, U.S.	7,500
046	UFC 41: Onslaught	Feb 28, 2003	Boardwalk Hall	Atlantic City, New Jersey, U.S.	11,707

== See also ==
- UFC
- List of UFC champions
- List of UFC events
