= UFC 45 =

UFC mixed martial arts event in 2003

UFC 45: Revolution
- The poster for UFC 45: Revolution
- Promotion: Ultimate Fighting Championship
- Date: November 21, 2003
- Venue: Mohegan Sun Arena
- City: Uncasville, Connecticut
- Attendance: 9,200
- Buyrate: 40,000

Event chronology
UFC 44: Undisputed	UFC 45: Revolution	UFC 46: Supernatural

UFC 45: Revolution was a mixed martial arts event held by the Ultimate Fighting Championship on November 21, 2003, at the Mohegan Sun Casino in Uncasville, Connecticut. The event was broadcast live on pay-per-view in the United States, and later released on DVD.

== History ==
This event marked the 10th anniversary of the UFC and to celebrate, the UFC inaugurated its Hall of Fame, with Royce Gracie and Ken Shamrock as the first inductees. UFC President Dana White said; "We feel that no two individuals are more deserving than Royce and Ken to be the charter members. Their contributions to our sport, both inside and outside the Octagon, may never be equaled.”

In addition, ten fighters were chosen by fans to receive a Viewer's Choice Award during the event; they were Royce Gracie, Ken Shamrock, Randy Couture, Tank Abbott, Mark Coleman, Pat Miletich, Marco Ruas, Dan Severn, Don Frye and Oleg Taktarov.

Frank Mir was scheduled to fight Tim Sylvia in a UFC Heavyweight Championship fight, then Wes Sims in a UFC 43 rematch, and finally, UFC 1 & 2 veteran Patrick Smith at this event, but each fighter was pulled from the card, resulting in Mir's withdrawal as well.

== Results ==
Main Card
Weight class				Method	Round	Time	Notes
Welterweight	Matt Hughes (c)	def.	Frank Trigg	Submission (standing rear-naked choke)	1	3:54	(Note: For the UFC Welterweight Championship.)
Middleweight	Matt Lindland	def.	Falaniko Vitale	TKO (submission to punches)	3	4:23
Heavyweight	Wesley Correira	def.	Tank Abbott	TKO (doctor stoppage)	1	2:14
Middleweight	Evan Tanner	def.	Phil Baroni	TKO (punches)	1	4:42
Welterweight	Robbie Lawler	def.	Chris Lytle	Decision (unanimous) (29–28, 29–28, 29–28)	3	5:00
Preliminary card
Heavyweight	Pedro Rizzo	def.	Ricco Rodriguez	Decision (unanimous) (30–27, 29–28, 30–27)	3	5:00
Middleweight	Keith Rockel	def.	Chris Liguori	Submission (guillotine choke)	1	3:29
Lightweight	Yves Edwards	def.	Nick Agallar	TKO (punches)	2	2:14

== Encyclopedia awards ==
The following fighters were honored in the October 2011 book titled UFC Encyclopedia.

- Fight of the Night: Evan Tanner vs. Phil Baroni
- Knockout of the Night: Evan Tanner
- Submission of the Night: Matt Hughes

== See also ==
- Ultimate Fighting Championship
- List of UFC champions
- List of UFC events
- 2003 in UFC
