= 2004 in UFC =

Mixed martial arts events

Information
- First date: Jan 31, 2004
- Last date: Oct 22, 2004

Events
- Total events: 5
- UFC: 5

Fights
- Total fights: 39
- Title fights: 5

Chronology
| 2003 in UFC | 2004 in UFC | 2005 in UFC |

The year 2004 was the 12th year in the history of the Ultimate Fighting Championship (UFC), a mixed martial arts promotion based in the United States. In 2004 the UFC held 5 events beginning with, UFC 46: Supernatural.

== Title fights ==
Title fights in 2004
| Weight class | | | | Method | Round | Time | Event | Notes |
|---|---|---|---|---|---|---|---|---|
| Welterweight | B.J. Penn | def. | Matt Hughes (c) | Submission (Rear-Naked Choke) | 1 | 4:39 | UFC 46: Supernatural | (Note: For the UFC Welterweight Championship.) |
| Light Heavyweight | Vitor Belfort | def. | Randy Couture (c) | TKO (Cut) | 1 | 0:49 | UFC 46: Supernatural | (Note: For the UFC Light Heavyweight Championship.) |
| Heavyweight | Frank Mir | def. | Tim Sylvia | Technical Submission (Armbar) | 1 | 0:50 | UFC 48: Payback | (Note: For the UFC Heavyweight Championship. Referee Herb Dean called a stop to the bout when he noticed a break in Sylvia's arm which appeared to Sylvia and the audience as an early stoppage; it was later revealed that Sylvia had indeed suffered multiple fractures to his right forearm.) |
| Light Heavyweight | Randy Couture | def. | Vitor Belfort (c) | TKO (Doctor Stoppage) | 3 | 5:00 | UFC 49: Unfinished Business | (Note: For the UFC Light Heavyweight Championship. Couture becomes the UFC Light Heavyweight Champion for the second time.) |
| Welterweight | Matt Hughes | def. | Georges St-Pierre | Submission (Armbar) | 1 | 4:59 | UFC 50: The War Of '04 | (Note: For the UFC Welterweight Championship. Hughes becomes the UFC Welterweight champion filling the vacant title. Hughes had previously lost the title to BJ Penn, but Penn had been stripped of the belt after signing with K-1.) |

== Debut UFC fighters ==
The following fighters fought their first UFC fight in 2004:

| ISO | Fighter | Division |
|---|---|---|
| (United States) | David Terrell | Middleweight |
| (Canada) | Georges St-Pierre | Welterweight |
| (Canada) | Ivan Menjivar | Lightweight |
| (United States) | Jay Hieron | Welterweight |
| (United States) | Jeff Curran | Lightweight |
| (Canada) | Joe Doerksen | Middleweight |

| ISO | Fighter | Division |
|---|---|---|
| (United States) | Joe Riggs | Middleweight |
| (United States) | Jonathan Wiezorek | Heavyweight |
| (United States) | Justin Eilers | Heavyweight |
| (England) | Lee Murray | Middleweight |
| (United States) | Mike Brown | Lightweight |
| (United States) | Mike Kyle | Heavyweight |

| ISO | Fighter | Division |
|---|---|---|
| (Canada) | Patrick Cote | Middleweight |
| (Brazil) | Renato Verissimo | Welterweight |
| (United States) | Ronald Jhun | Welterweight |
| (United States) | Travis Lutter | Middleweight |
| (South Africa) | Trevor Prangley | Middleweight |
| (United States) | Wade Shipp | Heavyweight |

== Events list ==
| # | Event | Date | Venue | Location | Attendance |
|---|---|---|---|---|---|
| 055 | UFC 50: The War Of '04 | Oct 22, 2004 | Boardwalk Hall | Atlantic City, New Jersey, U.S. | 9,000 |
| 054 | UFC 49: Unfinished Business | Aug 21, 2004 | MGM Grand Garden Arena | Las Vegas, Nevada, U.S. | 12,100 |
| 053 | UFC 48: Payback | Jun 19, 2004 | Mandalay Bay Events Center | Las Vegas, Nevada, U.S. | 10,000 |
| 052 | UFC 47: It's On! | Apr 2, 2004 | Mandalay Bay Events Center | Las Vegas, Nevada, U.S. | 11,437 |
| 051 | UFC 46: Supernatural | Jan 31, 2004 | Mandalay Bay Events Center | Las Vegas, Nevada, U.S. | 10,700 |

== See also ==
- UFC
- List of UFC champions
- List of UFC events
