= UFC 48 =

UFC mixed martial arts event in 2004

UFC 48: Payback
- The poster for UFC 48: Payback
- Promotion: Ultimate Fighting Championship
- Date: June 19, 2004
- Venue: Mandalay Bay Events Center
- City: Las Vegas, Nevada
- Attendance: 10,000 (Paid: 6,528)
- Total gate: $901,655
- Buyrate: 110,000

Event chronology
UFC 47: It's On!	UFC 48: Payback	UFC 49: Unfinished Business

UFC 48: Payback was a mixed martial arts event held by the Ultimate Fighting Championship on June 19, 2004, at the Mandalay Bay Events Center in Las Vegas, Nevada. The event was broadcast live on pay-per-view in the United States, and was later released on DVD.

== History ==
The featured contestants of the evening were Ken Shamrock and Kimo Leopoldo, who had met once before in 1996 in a UFC title fight at UFC 8, with Shamrock reigning victorious. The event was very successful, as it drew more pay per view buys than the highly anticipated match between Chuck Liddell and Tito Ortiz one event earlier at UFC 47.

== Results ==
Main Card
Weight class				Method	Round	Time	Notes
Heavyweight	Ken Shamrock	def.	Kimo Leopoldo	KO (knee)	1	1:26
Welterweight	Frank Trigg	def.	Dennis Hallman	TKO (punches)	1	4:15
Heavyweight	Frank Mir	def.	Tim Sylvia	Technical Submission (armbar)	1	0:50	(Note: For the vacant UFC Heavyweight Championship.)
Welterweight	Matt Hughes	def.	Renato Verissimo	Decision (unanimous) (30–27, 29–28, 30–27)	3	5:00
Middleweight	Evan Tanner	def.	Phil Baroni	Decision (unanimous) (30–27, 30–27, 29–28)	3	5:00
Preliminary card
Lightweight	Matt Serra	def.	Ivan Menjivar	Decision (unanimous) (30–27, 30–27, 30–27)	3	5:00
Middleweight	Trevor Prangley	def.	Curtis Stout	Submission (neck crank)	2	1:05
Welterweight	Georges St-Pierre	def.	Jay Hieron	TKO (punches)	1	1:42	(Note: Hieron was a late replacement for Jason "Mayhem" Miller, who had withdrawn from the card due to ongoing legal problems.)

== Fighter Payout ==
The total fighter payroll for UFC 48 was $586,000.

- Ken Shamrock: $170,000 ($120,000 to fight; $50,000 to win)
- Matt Hughes: $110,000 ($55,000 to fight; $55,000 to win)
- Frank Mir: $90,000 ($60,000 to fight; $30,000 to win)
- Kimo Leopoldo: $55,000
- Tim Sylvia: $40,000
- Evan Tanner: $30,000 ($15,000 to fight; $15,000 to win)
- Phil Baroni: $20,000
- Frank Trigg: $20,000 ($10,000 to fight; $10,000 to win)
- Matt Serra: $16,000 ($8,000 to fight; $8,000 to win)
- Renato Verissimo: $10,000
- Georges St-Pierre: $8,000 ($4,000 to fight; $4,000 to win)
- Trevor Prangley: $5,000 ($2,500 to fight; $2,500 to win)
- Dennis Hallman: $4,000
- Curtis Stout: $3,000
- Jay Hieron: $3,000
- Ivan Menjivar: $2,000

== Encyclopedia awards ==
The following fighters were honored in the October 2011 book titled UFC Encyclopedia.

- Fight of the Night: Evan Tanner vs. Phil Baroni
- Knockout of the Night: Georges St-Pierre
- Submission of the Night: Frank Mir

== See also ==
- Ultimate Fighting Championship
- List of UFC champions
- List of UFC events
- 2004 in UFC
