= Wesley Correira =

American mixed martial artist

- Born: Wesley John Correira Jr. November 11, 1978 (age 47); Hilo, Hawaii, U.S.
- Other names: Cabbage
- Height: 6 ft 3 in (191 cm)
- Weight: 253 lb (115 kg; 18 st 1 lb)
- Division: Heavyweight; Super Heavyweight
- Reach: 200 cm (79 in)
- Fighting out of: Hilo, Hawaii, U.S.
- Team: B.J. Penn's MMA; Grappling Unlimited; Cabbage MMA
- Rank: Brown belt in Judo
- Years active: 2000-2009; 2013-2016

Kickboxing record
- Total: 3
- Wins: 1
- By knockout: 1
- Losses: 2
- By knockout: 2
- Draws: 0

Mixed martial arts record
- Total: 37
- Wins: 21
- By knockout: 17
- By submission: 2
- By decision: 1
- By disqualification: 1
- Losses: 16
- By knockout: 8
- By submission: 3
- By decision: 5

Other information
- Mixed martial arts record from Sherdog
- Last updated on: March 15, 2013

Wesley Correira (born November 11, 1978), is an American mixed martial artist who competed in the heavyweight and super heavyweight divisions. A professional from 2000 to 2016, he formerly competed for the Ultimate Fighting Championship.

== Early life ==
Correira trained in boxing, judo (earning a brown belt), karate and wrestling during high school, and eventually made the jump to Mixed Martial Arts. He went on to train with Egan Inoue, B.J. Penn and Falaniko Vitale. He earned the nickname "Cabbage" as a child due to his resemblance to the Cabbage Patch Kids.

== Career ==
Correira debuted on July 22, 2000, at the Rings USA: Rising Stars Block B regional qualifying tournament in Honolulu, Hawaii, losing to Eric Pele by submission due to an armbar in round two of their semi-final bout. After joining the SuperBrawl promotion, he would then lose to Travis Fulton by the same method three months later and Preston Hartzog by split decision a month after that. Having begun his career with three consecutive losses, he won his first fight with a disqualification victory over Marcelo Tigre at SuperBrawl 21 on May 24, 2001, before a string of three technical knockout wins brought his record into the winning margin.

In late April 2002, Correira was invited to compete in the SuperBrawl 24: Return of the Heavyweights tournament held over two consecutive days in Honolulu. He TKO'd Kevin Jordan in the tournament's first round and caused Travis Wiuff to tap with knee strikes in the quarter-finals but was unable to fight in the semis due to an injury sustained. When a knockout of Kauai Kupihea the following month improved his record to 7–3 with six knockouts, he was signed by the Ultimate Fighting Championship and debuted against Tim Sylvia, the man who won the SuperBrawl tournament, at UFC 39 in Uncasville, Connecticut on September 27, 2002. The bout was the "Fight of the Night" as Correira took everything Sylvia could dish out for the first round. Correira's corner threw in the towel nearly two minutes into the second round after he took too much abuse. As he took such a heavy beating without ever being knocked down, commentator Mike Goldberg exclaimed during the fight "this man is not human!". In fact, during the seven minutes the fight lasted, Correira absorbed the highest number of power strikes ever recorded in one fight in UFC history.

After returning to Hawaii and taking two KO wins over Jason Lambert and Joe Riggs before the end of 2002, he made his way back to the UFC to face Sean Alvarez at UFC 42 in Miami, Florida on April 25, 2003. A noted grappler, Alvarez was unable to take Correira down for much of the fight. After he finally got the takedown, Alvarez was too tired to be able to control Correira, who made his way back to his feet and TKO'd him with punches and knees in round two. After another two fight stint on the Hawaiian circuit, a split decision win over Justin Eilers and TKO of Steve Sayegh, Correira took on fellow brawler Tank Abbott at UFC 45 in Uncasville on November 21, 2003. He dropped Tank a couple of time early in the fight and opened a cut, which caused the ringside doctor to stop the fight and give Correira the TKO victory. Immediately after the stoppage, Correira did his trademark "Cabbage Patch dance" and then gave Abbot the finger which set off a mini riot as John Marsh, Eddie Ruiz and other members of Abbott's posse mixed with Chuck Liddell and others who came to break up the conflict.

In his final UFC appearance, Correira was TKO'd by Andrei Arlovski in round two at UFC 47 in Las Vegas, Nevada on April 2, 2004. He then lost on points to John Marsh and Yoshihiro Nakao in the Rumble on the Rock promotion in his next two outings before bouncing back with a first-round KO of Walt Pels at WEC 14 in Lemoore, California on March 17, 2005. A rematch between Correira and Tank Abbott went down at Rumble on the Rock 7 in Honolulu on May 7, 2005, and Abbott got his revenge when he became the first man to knock Correira unconscious, doing so in the first round.

He ventured into the world of kickboxing when he was recruited by K-1 to fight in the K-1 World Grand Prix 2005 in Hawaii on July 29, 2005. Paired with fellow MMA slugger and eventual tournament champion Gary Goodridge in the quarter-finals, Correira went out as is typical of MMA fighters trying their hand at kickboxing; he was chopped down with low kicks in round one. Returning to MMA, he took three straight wins by first round stoppage before falling to Eric "Butterbean" Esch via TKO due to a broken arm at Rumble on the Rock 8 in Honolulu on January 20, 2006, in a fight which took place under special rules, ground fighting being limited to fifteen seconds per instance regardless of the situation. This triggered a run of defeats as Cabbage was submitted with a Kimura by Kazuhiro Hamanaka at Rumble on the Rock 9 on April 21, 2006, and then stopped via cut by debuting professional wrestler Mike Polchlopek at Rumble on the Rock: Beatdown 1 on June 17, 2006.

Cabbage was scheduled to fight Ruben Villareal at Strikeforce: Tank vs. Buentello in Fresno, California on October 7, 2006, but withdrew for medical reasons. Another bout that fell through was a proposed fight with Tengiz Tedoradze at Cage Rage 19: Fearless in London, England on December 9, 2006.

He lost to Antônio Silva by first-round TKO in the co-main event of EliteXC: Destiny in Southaven, Mississippi on February 10, 2007. After surviving an early onslaught of ground-and-pound, Correira made his way back to his feet but was floored with a flying knee and followed up on with punches. This loss effectively resigned Correira to journeyman status.

His anticipated Cage Rage debut was moved back to Cage Rage 22: Hard As Hell on July 14, 2007, where he was set to face James Thompson but once again it fell through as he was replaced by Neil Grove.

Wesley Correira made his second foray into the kickboxing ring at the K-1 World Grand Prix 2008 in Hawaii on August 9, 2008, where a rematch with Eric Esch awaited him at the quarter-final stage. He spent four months practicing Muay Thai in Bangkok, Thailand before the tournament and his training paid off as he finished Butterbean with a high kick in round two to secure a place in the semis. There, he was initially set to face Mighty Mo but he was injured and replaced by Randy Kim. Correira's inability to check kicks was once again his downfall as he was knocked down twice and stopped with kicks to the lead leg in the second round.

Although this would be his last appearance in a ring or cage for almost five years, a match with Lion's Den fighter Buddy Roberts was penciled in for February 13, 2009, on a WarGods/Ken Shamrock Productions co-promoted event, Valentine's Day Massacre. Correira backed out of the fight an hour beforehand after he learned the promotion would be cutting his fight purse in half to cover last-minute costs for his state-required medical tests. Further controversy arose when he tested positive for marijuana in a pre-fight drug test. While anyone with above 50 ng/mL of the drug in their system is considered "a truly [sic] active user", Cabbage registered a staggering 700 ng/mL. He was suspended for six months and fined $1,000 by the California State Athletic Commission.

Correira made his comeback to the cage on January 19, 2013, at Rumble World Entertainment: Just Scrap 19 in his hometown of Hilo, Hawaii, losing to Deutsch Pu'u by TKO in round one. He then earned his first MMA win in five years and his first proper submission victory when he tapped Paea Paongo with a Kimura in the second round of the Rumble World Entertainment: Just Scrap Maui 4 main event in Maui, Hawaii.

== Legal issues ==
On May 11, 2011, Correira was arrested on charges of burglary and theft.

== Kickboxing record ==
Kickboxing record
1 win (1 KO), 2 losses, 0 draws
Date	Result	Opponent	Event	Location	Method	Round	Time	Record
2008-08-09	Loss	(South Korea) Randy Kim	K-1 World Grand Prix 2008 in Hawaii, Semi Finals	Honolulu, Hawaii, US	KO (left low kick)	2	1:00	1–2
2008-08-09	Win	(United States) Eric Esch	K-1 World Grand Prix 2008 in Hawaii, Quarter Finals	Honolulu, Hawaii, US	TKO (left high kick)	2	0:53	1-1
2005-07-29	Loss	(Trinidad and Tobago) Gary Goodridge	K-1 World Grand Prix 2005 in Hawaii, Quarter Finals	Honolulu, Hawaii, US	TKO (right low kick)	1	2:43	0–1
Legend: Win Loss Draw/No contest Notes

== Championship and accomplishments ==
- Icon Sport
  - Icon Sport Heavyweight Championship (one time, only)

== Mixed martial arts record ==
Professional record breakdown
37 matches	21 wins	16 losses
By knockout	17	8
By submission	2	3
By decision	1	5
By disqualification	1	0

Res.	Record	Opponent	Method	Event	Date	Round	Time	Location	Notes
Loss	21–16	Daniel Spitz	Decision (unanimous)	RWE: Just Scrap	April 22, 2016	3	5:00	Hilo, Hawaii, United States	
Win	21–15	Matt Kovacs	TKO (punches)	RWE: Just Scrap	November 13, 2015	1	0:52	Hilo, Hawaii, United States	
Win	20–15	Paea Paongo	Submission (kimura)	RWE: Just Scrap Maui IV	March 15, 2013	2	1:55	Maui, Hawaii, United States	
Loss	19–15	Deutsch Pu'u	TKO (punches)	RWE: Just Scrap 19	January 19, 2013	1	0:43	Hilo, Hawaii, United States	
Loss	19–14	Jeff Ford	TKO (punches)	Worldwide Fighting Championship: Armageddon	April 12, 2008	1	4:59	Denver, Colorado, United States	
Win	19–13	Jacob Faagai	TKO (shoulder injury)	X-1: Events-Champions	January 26, 2008	1	2:17	Honolulu, Hawaii, United States	
Loss	18–13	Chris Marez	Decision (unanimous)	X-1: Extreme Fighting 2	March 17, 2007	3	5:00	Honolulu, Hawaii, United States	
Loss	18–12	Antônio Silva	TKO (flying knee and punches)	EliteXC: Destiny	February 10, 2007	1	3:49	Southaven, Mississippi, United States	
Win	18–11	Kim Ji-Hoon	TKO	Pacific Xtreme Combat 8: Terror Dome	July 28, 2006	1	2:07	Mangilao, Guam	
Loss	17–11	Mike Polchlopek	TKO (cut)	Rumble on the Rock: Beatdown 1	June 17, 2006	1	1:46	Hawaii, United States	
Loss	17–10	Kazuhiro Hamanaka	Submission (kimura)	Rumble on the Rock 9	April 21, 2006	2	1:53	Honolulu, Hawaii, United States	
Loss	17–9	Butterbean	TKO (doctor stoppage)	Rumble on the Rock 8	January 20, 2006	2	5:00	Honolulu, Hawaii, United States	Correira broke his arm.
Win	17–8	Manny Chong	TKO	Fury Full Contact Fighting 4: Collision	December 10, 2005	1	1:50	Guam	
Win	16–8	Junior Sua	Submission (position)	Rumble on the Rock: Just Scrap	November 5, 2005	1	1:21	Hilo, Hawaii, United States	
Win	15–8	Lloyd Marshbanks	TKO	Rumble on the Rock: Showdown in Maui	October 7, 2005	1	3:16	Maui, Hawaii, United States	
Loss	14–8	Tank Abbott	KO (punch)	Rumble on the Rock 7	May 7, 2005	1	1:23	Honolulu, Hawaii, United States	
Win	14–7	Walt Pels	KO (punches)	WEC 14: Vengeance	March 17, 2005	1	0:23	Lemoore, California, United States	
Loss	13–7	Yoshihiro Nakao	Decision (split)	Rumble on the Rock 6	November 20, 2004	3	5:00	Honolulu, Hawaii, United States	
Loss	13–6	John Marsh	Decision (unanimous)	Rumble on the Rock 5	May 7, 2004	3	5:00	Honolulu, Hawaii, United States	
Loss	13–5	Andrei Arlovski	TKO (punches)	UFC 47	April 2, 2004	2	1:15	Las Vegas, Nevada, United States	
Win	13–4	Tank Abbott	TKO (cut)	UFC 45	November 21, 2003	1	2:14	Uncasville, Connecticut, United States	
Win	12–4	Steve Sayegh	TKO (punches)	Rumble on the Rock 3	August 9, 2003	1	2:19	Hilo, Hawaii, United States	
Win	11–4	Justin Eilers	Decision (split)	SuperBrawl 30: Collision Course	June 13, 2003	3	5:00	Honolulu, Hawaii, United States	
Win	10–4	Sean Alvarez	TKO (knees and punches)	UFC 42	April 25, 2003	2	1:46	Miami, Florida, United States	
Win	9–4	Joe Riggs	KO (knee and punch)	Rumble on the Rock 1	December 28, 2002	2	2:07	Hilo, Hawaii, United States	
Win	8–4	Jason Lambert	KO	SuperBrawl 27	November 9, 2002	2	1:48	Honolulu, Hawaii, United States	Won Icon Sport Heavyweight Championship
Loss	7–4	Tim Sylvia	TKO (corner stoppage)	UFC 39	September 27, 2002	2	1:43	Uncasville, Connecticut, United States	
Win	7–3	Kauai Kupihea	TKO	Force Fighting Championships 1	May 18, 2002	2	2:53	Honolulu, Hawaii, United States	
Win	6–3	Travis Wiuff	TKO (Submission to knees)	SuperBrawl 24: Return of the Heavyweights 2	April 27, 2002	3	1:40	Honolulu, Hawaii, United States	SuperBrawl 24: Return of the Heavyweights tournament quarter-final.
Win	5–3	Kevin Jordan	TKO (punches)	SuperBrawl 24: Return of the Heavyweights 1	April 26, 2002	1	4:28	Honolulu, Hawaii, United States	SuperBrawl 24: Return of the Heavyweights tournament first round.
Win	4–3	Renato Bruzzi	TKO (punches)	SuperBrawl 23	March 9, 2002	2	4:55	Honolulu, Hawaii, United States	
Win	3–3	Aaron Brink	TKO (punches)	Shogun 1	December 15, 2001	1	1:08	Honolulu, Hawaii, United States	
Win	2–3	Mike Tynanes	TKO (retirement)	SuperBrawl 22	November 2, 2001	2	3:22	Honolulu, Hawaii, United States	
Win	1–3	Marcelo Tigre	DQ (headbutt)	SuperBrawl 21	May 24, 2001	2	0:46	Honolulu, Hawaii, United States	
Loss	0–3	Preston Hartzog	Decision (split)	Superbrawl 19: Futurebrawl 2000	November 14, 2000	3	5:00	Honolulu, Hawaii, United States	
Loss	0–2	Travis Fulton	Submission (armbar)	SuperBrawl 18	October 26, 2000	1	4:49	Hagåtña, Guam	
Loss	0–1	Eric Pele	Submission (armbar)	Rings USA: Rising Stars Block B	July 22, 2000	2	2:30	Honolulu, Hawaii, United States	Rings USA: Rising Stars Block B tournament semi-final.
