= UFC 41 =

UFC mixed martial arts event in 2003

UFC 41: Onslaught
- The poster for UFC 41: Onslaught
- Promotion: Ultimate Fighting Championship
- Date: February 28, 2003
- Venue: Boardwalk Hall
- City: Atlantic City, New Jersey
- Attendance: 11,707

Event chronology
UFC 40: Vendetta	UFC 41: Onslaught	UFC 42: Sudden Impact

UFC 41: Onslaught was a mixed martial arts event held by the Ultimate Fighting Championship on February 28, 2003, at the Boardwalk Hall in Atlantic City, New Jersey. The event was broadcast live on pay-per-view in the United States, and later released on DVD.

== History ==
UFC 41 featured two championship bouts, a Heavyweight Championship Bout between Ricco Rodriguez and Tim Sylvia, and a Lightweight Championship Bout between B.J. Penn and Caol Uno. The event also marked the return of Tank Abbott to the UFC. Ken Shamrock served as the color commentator for this card.

== Results ==
Main Card
Weight class				Method	Round	Time	Notes
Heavyweight	Tim Sylvia	def.	Ricco Rodriguez (c)	TKO (punches)	1	3:09	(Note: For the UFC Heavyweight Championship.)
Heavyweight	Frank Mir	def.	Tank Abbott	Submission (toe hold)	1	0:46
Lightweight	B.J. Penn	vs.	Caol Uno	Draw (split) (48–46, 47–48, 48–48)	5	5:00	(Note: For the vacant UFC Lightweight Championship. Penn and Uno fought to a split draw after five rounds. Judges scored the bout 48–47 Uno, 48–46 Penn, and 48–48. This match was the final match of a 4-man tournament that took place over several cards to crown a new lightweight champion, the first round occurred on UFC 39. Without a definite outcome, the title remained vacant and eventually put the Lightweight division on hiatus. The Lightweight championship would be contested once again at UFC 64 and since then has become a permanent fixture in the UFC.)
Middleweight	Matt Lindland	def.	Phil Baroni	Decision (unanimous) (29–28, 29–28, 29–28)	3	5:00
Heavyweight	Vladimir Matyushenko	def.	Pedro Rizzo	Decision (unanimous) (29–28, 30–27, 29–28)	3	5:00
Preliminary card
Lightweight	Din Thomas	def.	Matt Serra	Decision (split)	3	5:00	(Note: Thomas wins by split decision. Originally, Matt Serra had won by split decision. Further inspection revealed that Judge Doc Hamilton had transposed his scoring in the final round, accidentally giving Serra's column the winning score of ten instead of its intended slot to Thomas. Setting a precedent for the sport, the New Jersey State Athletic Control Board deemed the decision be reversed, and UFC president Dana White personally reported the change to Thomas and his team.)
Heavyweight	Gan McGee	def.	Alexandre Dantas	TKO (punches)	1	4:49
Lightweight	Yves Edwards	def.	Rich Clementi	Submission (rear-naked choke)	3	4:07

== Lightweight tournament bracket ==
Semifinals
(United States)	B.J. Penn	DU
(United States)	Matt Serra	3
(Japan)	Caol Uno	DU
(United States)	Din Thomas	3

Finals (UFC 41)
(United States)	B.J. Penn	DS^{1}
(Japan)	Caol Uno	15:00

^{1} In UFC 41, B.J. Penn and Caol Uno had a split draw. (48-46, 47-48, 48-48). There was no champion.

== Encyclopedia awards ==
The following fighters were honored in the October 2011 book titled UFC Encyclopedia.

- Fight of the Night: Matt Lindland vs. Phil Baroni
- Knockout of the Night: Tim Sylvia
- Submission of the Night: Frank Mir

== See also ==
- Ultimate Fighting Championship
- List of UFC champions
- List of UFC events
- 2003 in UFC
