= UFC 42 =

UFC mixed martial arts event in 2003

UFC 42: Sudden Impact
- The poster for UFC 42: Sudden Impact
- Promotion: Ultimate Fighting Championship
- Date: April 25, 2003
- Venue: American Airlines Arena
- City: Miami, Florida
- Attendance: 6,700
- Buyrate: 35,000

Event chronology
UFC 41: Onslaught	UFC 42: Sudden Impact	UFC 43: Meltdown

UFC 42: Sudden Impact was a mixed martial arts event held by the Ultimate Fighting Championship on April 25, 2003, at American Airlines Arena in Miami, Florida. The event was broadcast live on pay-per-view in the United States, and later released on DVD.

== History ==
UFC 42 was the first UFC event to take place in Florida. It would be almost 20 years to the date until UFC would return to Miami, with UFC 287.

Headlining the event was a Welterweight title bout between Matt Hughes and Sean Sherk. UFC 42 also marked the first UFC appearance of future Middleweight Champion Rich Franklin.

Joe Rogan provided the lead commentary for this event and was joined on colour commentator by fighter Phil Baroni with further analysis by Eddie Bravo.

== Results ==
Main Card
Weight class				Method	Round	Time	Notes
Welterweight	Matt Hughes (c)	def.	Sean Sherk	Decision (unanimous) (49–46, 48–47, 48–45)	5	5:00	(Note: For the UFC Welterweight Championship.)
Welterweight	Pete Spratt	def.	Robbie Lawler	TKO (knee injury)	2	2:28
Welterweight	Dave Strasser	def.	Romie Aram	Decision (unanimous) (30–27, 30–27, 30–27)	3	5:00
Heavyweight	Wesley Correira	def.	Sean Alvarez	TKO (knees and punches)	2	1:46
Light Heavyweight	Rich Franklin	def.	Evan Tanner	TKO (punches)	1	2:40
Lightweight	Duane Ludwig	def.	Genki Sudo	Decision (split) (29–28, 28–29, 29–28)	3	5:00
Preliminary card
Lightweight	Hermes França	def.	Rich Crunkilton	Decision (unanimous) (29–28, 29–28, 29–28)	3	5:00
Middleweight	David Loiseau	def.	Mark Weir	KO (punches)	1	3:55

== Aftermath ==
During the bout between Ludwig and Sudo, action was halted by the referee in order to have Ludwig's facial lacerations assessed by the ringside doctor. Albeit Ludwig was in the bottom position on the mat before the halt, the action continued standing up which prompted a rule change: the action should be restarted from the same position where it was halted.

== Encyclopedia awards ==
The following fighters were honored in the October 2011 book titled UFC Encyclopedia.

- Fight of the Night: Matt Hughes vs. Sean Sherk
- Knockout of the Night: David Loiseau

== See also ==
- Ultimate Fighting Championship
- List of UFC champions
- List of UFC events
- 2003 in UFC
