= UFC 44 =

UFC mixed martial arts event in 2003

UFC 44: Undisputed
- The poster for UFC 44: Undisputed
- Promotion: Ultimate Fighting Championship
- Date: September 26, 2003
- Venue: Mandalay Bay Events Center
- City: Paradise, Nevada
- Attendance: 10,400
- Total gate: $127,985
- Buyrate: 94,000

Event chronology
UFC 43: Meltdown	UFC 44: Undisputed	UFC 45: Revolution

UFC 44: Undisputed was a mixed martial arts event held by the Ultimate Fighting Championship on September 26, 2003, at the Mandalay Bay Events Center in the Las Vegas suburb of Paradise, Nevada. The event was broadcast live on pay-per-view in the United States, and later released on DVD.

== History ==
Headlining the card was a Light Heavyweight Championship unification bout between Tito Ortiz and Randy Couture. The total fighter payroll for the event was $467,500. The ring interviewer was Eddie Bravo. UFC 44 marked the first UFC appearance of future Welterweight Strikeforce Champion Nick Diaz.

== Results ==
Main Card
Weight class				Method	Round	Time	Notes
Light Heavyweight	Randy Couture (ic)	def.	Tito Ortiz (c)	Decision (unanimous) (50–44, 50–44, 50–45)	5	5:00	(Note: For the UFC Light Heavyweight Championship.)
Heavyweight	Tim Sylvia (c)	def.	Gan McGee	TKO (punches)	1	1:54	(Note: For the UFC Heavyweight Championship.)
Heavyweight	Andrei Arlovski	def.	Vladimir Matyushenko	KO (punch)	1	1:59
Middleweight	Jorge Rivera	def.	David Loiseau	Decision (unanimous) (29–28, 29–27, 29–28)	3	5:00
Light Heavyweight	Rich Franklin	def.	Edwin Dewees	TKO (punches and knees)	1	3:35
Preliminary card
Welterweight	Karo Parisyan	def.	Dave Strasser	Submission (kimura)	1	3:52
Lightweight	Josh Thomson	def.	Gerald Strebendt	KO (punches)	1	2:45
Welterweight	Nick Diaz	def.	Jeremy Jackson	Submission (armbar)	3	2:04
Lightweight	Hermes França	def.	Caol Uno	KO (punch)	2	2:46

== Encyclopedia awards ==
The following fighters were honored in the October 2011 book titled UFC Encyclopedia.

- Fight of the Night: Randy Couture vs. Tito Ortiz
- Knockout of the Night: Andrei Arlovski
- Submission of the Night: Nick Diaz

== See also ==
- Ultimate Fighting Championship
- List of UFC champions
- List of UFC events
- 2003 in UFC
