= Din Thomas =

American mixed martial arts fighter

- Born: Din Yero Thomas; September 28, 1976 (age 50); Wilmington, Delaware, U.S.
- Other names: Dinyero
- Height: 5 ft 9 in (1.75 m)
- Weight: 143 lb (65 kg; 10 st 3 lb)
- Division: Featherweight (2009–2014); Lightweight; Welterweight
- Style: Brazilian jiu-jitsu
- Stance: Orthodox
- Fighting out of: Port St. Lucie, Florida, U.S.
- Team: American Top Team (2001–2020)
- Rank: 3rd degree black belt in Brazilian Jiu-Jitsu under Ricardo Liborio
- Years active: 1998–2013

Mixed martial arts record
- Total: 36
- Wins: 26
- By knockout: 8
- By submission: 14
- By decision: 4
- Losses: 9
- By knockout: 2
- By submission: 2
- By decision: 5
- No contests: 1

Other information
- Boxing record from BoxRec
- Mixed martial arts record from Sherdog
- Last updated on: February 15, 2010

Din Yero Thomas (/ˈdiːn/ DEEN; born September 28, 1976) is an American former mixed martial artist who was featured on The Ultimate Fighter 4: The Comeback. In the Ultimate Fighting Championship, Thomas is a UFC 41 Lightweight Tournament Semifinalist and a current analyst for the organization. He holds a Black belt in Brazilian Jiu-Jitsu under Ricardo Liborio and currently runs two successful Brazilian Jiu-Jitsu and MMA academies in Port St. Lucie, Florida. Thomas holds notable victories of (UFC Lightweight Champion) Jens Pulver, (UFC Welterweight Champion) Matt Serra, and (Strikeforce Lightweight Champion) Clay Guida.

Thomas has acted in local independent films, portraying The Fight Kid in Chris Fuller's Loren Cass and Reverend Pierce in Natalie, Queen of Scots. He appeared alongside Dana White and former opponent Matt Serra on Dana White: Lookin' for a Fight, and currently is a cast member of the UFC Live Weigh-in Show as well as the Poker Studs Comedy YouTube series.

== Background ==
Thomas was born in Wilmington, Delaware, where he lived until he was 12 years old. When he was 12 Thomas moved to Port St. Lucie, Florida, and attended Port St. Lucie High School. Thomas flirted with baseball and football growing up, but ultimately did not have a serious interest in team sports because he did not like negatively affecting his teammates. A few weeks before his 18th birthday, Thomas' life changed drastically. He had recently broken up with his girlfriend, and in a fit of rage beat up her new boyfriend at her house. The young Thomas was charged with battery and had to spend his weekends in prison for the next year. Soon, he turned his attention to jiu-jitsu and began training in a small academy near his home. [link dead]

== Mixed martial arts career ==
Before entering the UFC, Thomas held a 12–1 MMA record including wins over future UFC lightweight champion Jens Pulver and Dokonjonosuke Mishima, with his only loss coming to future UFC lightweight title challenger Caol Uno. Thomas made his UFC debut at UFC 32, in a fight against future UFC Lightweight and Welterweight champion B.J. Penn, where he lost by TKO (strikes) in the first round. Thomas returned at UFC 33, defeating Fabiano Iha by unanimous decision.

At UFC 39, Thomas faced Japanese superstar Caol Uno in a rematch. The fight was part of a tournament to determine the new UFC Lightweight Champion. After three rounds, Thomas lost by unanimous decision. His next fight was a split decision victory over future UFC welterweight champion Matt Serra at UFC 41. This fight would prove somewhat controversial, due to one of the judges mistakenly placing the score he assigned to Thomas in the column reserved for Serra. This caused Serra to be declared the winner by decision, but the mistake was discovered and Thomas and his team were notified of the change, giving Thomas the split decision victory. This would be Thomas' last UFC fight for 3 years.

Thomas was a contestant on The Ultimate Fighter 4 where he defeated Mikey Burnett in the first round, before losing to training partner Chris Lytle by decision in the semi-finals. Thomas returned at the finale on November 11, 2006, to face Rich Clementi, winning via rear naked choke in the second round.

Thomas was then defeated via submission (rear naked choke) by future UFC lightweight title challenger Kenny Florian after injuring his knee in a takedown attempt while headlining the main event at UFC Fight Night 11. Doctors said in his takedown attempt that Thomas tore his meniscus and stretched his PCL. His most recent UFC fight was a unanimous decision loss to Josh Neer at UFC Fight Night 13. He was released from his UFC contract after this fight.

After his loss to Neer, Thomas decided to drop a weight class to featherweight (145 lbs). He debuted at featherweight against Dustin Pieken securing a triangle choke in the first round. He has followed that up with TKO wins over Gabe Lemley and Dustin Pague.

Thomas had signed with Shine Fights and was expected to make his debut against Ricardo Mayorga on May 15 in Fayetteville, North Carolina but it was canceled after Don King was granted an injunction preventing Mayorga from fighting.

Thomas was scheduled to return after a nearly two-year-long layoff October 7, 2011, at Fight Time 7 in Fort Lauderdale, Florida, a promotion headed up by his American Top Team boxing trainer, Howard Davis Jr. But Thomas was in a car accident prior to the event and had to be hospitalized for his injuries. His fight against George Sheppard was scheduled to be the main event of Fight Time 7: The Return of Din Thomas.

On January 2, 2014, Thomas announced his retirement from mixed martial arts.

== Coaching career ==
Besides his own professional mixed martial artist career, Thomas has been coaching since the early days of MMA. He started coaching at Mike Metzger's Internal Power Karate School in 1999. Thomas owned multiple MMA and jiu-jitsu schools until he was recruited to become one of the primary coaches at American Top Team in 2015. Before becoming a full-time coach at ATT, he had been partially affiliated with the team and its athletes since 2001. In March 2020, Thomas announced that he had departed from ATT in order to pursue his own MMA camp.

== Personal life ==
Thomas is married and has a son named Ethon.

He also appeared in the 2007 Gotham Award-nominated independent feature film Loren Cass which had its United States premiere at Dennis Hopper's CineVegas Film Festival and its international premiere in the prestigious Filmmakers of the Present competition at the Locarno International Film Festival in Switzerland. The film was released in theaters and on DVD in 2009 by Kino International.

Thomas was arrested on October 30, 2007, on a charge of "felony prohibited competitions" in Port St. Lucie, Florida at his training gym. As of November 30, 2007, the Assistant State Attorney's office decided not to file formal charges against Thomas and filed paperwork dismissing the charge on which he was arrested. The Assistant D.A. stated if the fighter or participants were students of Thomas' school, and the purpose of the school is to teach martial arts, then they meet the exception to the law.

== Championships and accomplishments ==
=== Mixed martial arts ===
- Ultimate Fighting Championship
  - UFC 41 Lightweight Tournament Semifinalist
  - Fight of the Night (One time) vs. Clay Guida
  - Submission of the Night (One time) vs. Jeremy Stephens
  - UFC.com Awards
    - 2007: Half-Year Awards: Best Submission of the 1HY vs. Jeremy Stephens & Ranked #6 Submission of the Year vs. Jeremy Stephens
- World Extreme Fighting
  - World Extreme Fighting Lightweight Championship (Three times)
- Reality Super Fighting
  - Reality Super Fighting Lightweight Championship (Two times)
- International Sport Combat Federation
  - ISCF World Lightweight Championship (One time)

== Mixed martial arts record ==
Professional record breakdown
36 matches	26 wins	9 losses
By knockout	7	2
By submission	15	2
By decision	4	5
No contests	1	

Res.	Record	Opponent	Method	Event	Date	Round	Time	Location	Notes
Loss	26–9 (1)	Georgi Karakhanyan	Decision (unanimous)	Legacy Fighting Championship 19	April 12, 2013	3	5:00	Allen, Texas, United States	
NC	26–8 (1)	Cody Bollinger	No Contest	Pure MMA: Next Episode	May 12, 2012	1	2:04	Wilkes Barre, Pennsylvania, United States	For the Pure MMA Featherweight Championship. Overturned by the PSAC.
Win	26–8	Dustin Pague	TKO (doctor stoppage)	WEF: Brasco vs. Whitesel	January 8, 2010	2	4:14	Pittsburgh, Pennsylvania, United States	
Win	25–8	Gabe Lemley	TKO (knee)	SRP: March Badness	March 21, 2009	1	4:13	Pensacola, Florida, United States	
Win	24–8	Dustin Pieken	Submission (triangle choke)	HHP 1: The Patriot Act	February 7, 2009	1	2:58	Columbia, Missouri, United States	Featherweight debut.
Loss	23–8	Josh Neer	Decision (unanimous)	UFC Fight Night 13	April 2, 2008	3	5:00	Broomfield, Colorado, United States	
Loss	23–7	Kenny Florian	Submission (rear-naked choke)	UFC Fight Night 11	September 19, 2007	1	4:30	Las Vegas, Nevada, United States	
Win	23–6	Jeremy Stephens	Submission (armbar)	UFC 71	May 26, 2007	2	2:44	Las Vegas, Nevada, United States	Submission of the Night
Win	22–6	Clay Guida	Decision (unanimous)	UFC Fight Night 8	January 25, 2007	3	5:00	Hollywood, Florida, United States	Fight of the Night
Win	21–6	Rich Clementi	Submission (rear-naked choke)	The Ultimate Fighter 4 Finale	November 11, 2006	2	3:11	Las Vegas, Nevada, United States	
Loss	20–6	Luciano Azevedo	Decision (unanimous)	WCFC: No Guts No Glory	March 18, 2006	3	5:00	Manchester, England	
Win	20–5	Dwayne Shelton	Submission (armbar)	BP: Pride & Glory	September 17, 2005	1	N/A	Duluth, Georgia, United States	
Loss	19–5	Tyrone Glover	Decision (majority)	Deep: 20th Impact	September 3, 2005	3	5:00	Tokyo, Japan	
Win	19–4	John Strawn	Submission (armbar)	Absolute Fighting Championships 11	February 12, 2005	1	1:15	Fort Lauderdale, Florida, United States	
Win	18–4	Ray Totorico	Submission (ankle lock)	Battle of New Orleans 11	February 7, 2004	1	1:45	Metairie, Louisiana, United States	
Loss	17–4	Amar Suloev	TKO (punches and soccer kicks)	Inoki Bom-Ba-Ye 2003	December 31, 2003	1	4:22	Kobe, Japan	
Win	17–3	Steve Berger	Decision (unanimous)	Absolute Fighting Championships 4	July 19, 2003	3	5:00	Fort Lauderdale, Florida, United States	
Win	16–3	Matt Serra	Decision (split)	UFC 41	February 28, 2003	3	5:00	Atlantic City, New Jersey, United States	
Loss	15–3	Caol Uno	Decision (unanimous)	UFC 39	September 27, 2002	3	5:00	Uncasville, Connecticut, United States	UFC Lightweight Championship tournament semi-final
Win	15–2	Rob Baer	TKO (punches)	RSF 6: Mayhem in Myers	December 29, 2001	1	1:22	Fort Myers, Florida, United States	
Win	14–2	Jason Bender	TKO (punches)	RSF 5: New Blood Conflict	October 27, 2001	1	1:03	Augusta, Georgia, United States	
Win	13–2	Fabiano Iha	Decision (unanimous)	UFC 33	September 28, 2001	3	5:00	Las Vegas, Nevada, United States	
Loss	12–2	B.J. Penn	KO (knee and punches)	UFC 32	June 29, 2001	1	2:42	East Rutherford, New Jersey, United States	
Win	12–1	Scott Johnson	Submission (armbar)	RSF 1: Redemption in the Valley	April 21, 2001	1	3:11	Wheeling, West Virginia, United States	
Win	11–1	Stephen Palling	Submission (triangle choke)	SuperBrawl 20	February 23, 2001	1	3:52	Honolulu, Hawaii, United States	
Win	10–1	Jens Pulver	Submission (heel hook)	WEF: New Blood Conflict	August 26, 2000	2	0:33	United States	Won ISCF World Lightweight Championship
Win	9–1	Don Banville	TKO (corner stoppage)	World Extreme Fighting 9: World Class	May 13, 2000	2	4:00	Evansville, Indiana, United States	
Win	8–1	Dokonjonosuke Mishima	TKO (doctor stoppage)	Shooto – R.E.A.D. 2	March 17, 2000	2	3:37	Tokyo, Japan	Stoppage due to cut.
Win	7–1	Tim Douglas	Submission (armbar)	Reality Combat Fighting 4	February 19, 2000	1	0:45	Houma, Louisiana, United States	
Win	6–1	Ken Allen	Technical Submission (guillotine choke)	World Extreme Fighting 7: Stomp in the Swamp	October 9, 1999	1	3:16	Kenner, Louisiana, United States	
Loss	5–1	Caol Uno	Submission (rear-naked choke)	Shooto: Renaxis 4	September 5, 1999	3	3:16	Tokyo, Japan	
Win	5–0	Scott Bills	Submission (triangle choke)	World Extreme Fighting 5	February 21, 1999	1	3:46	United States	
Win	4–0	Scott Bills	TKO (retirement)	World Extreme Fighting 4	December 19, 1998	1	5:00	United States	
Win	3–0	Ed Lutz	Submission (rear-naked choke)	World Extreme Fighting 4	December 19, 1998	1	3:20	United States	
Win	2–0	Rodney Brown	Submission (keylock)	Ybor Vale Tudo	December 15, 1998	1	4:00	Tampa, Florida, United States	
Win	1–0	Tomas Velazquez	Submission (armbar)	WVF: Jacksonville Vale Tudo 1	October 28, 1998	1	1:02	Jacksonville, Florida, United States	
