= Matt Serra =

American mixed martial arts fighter

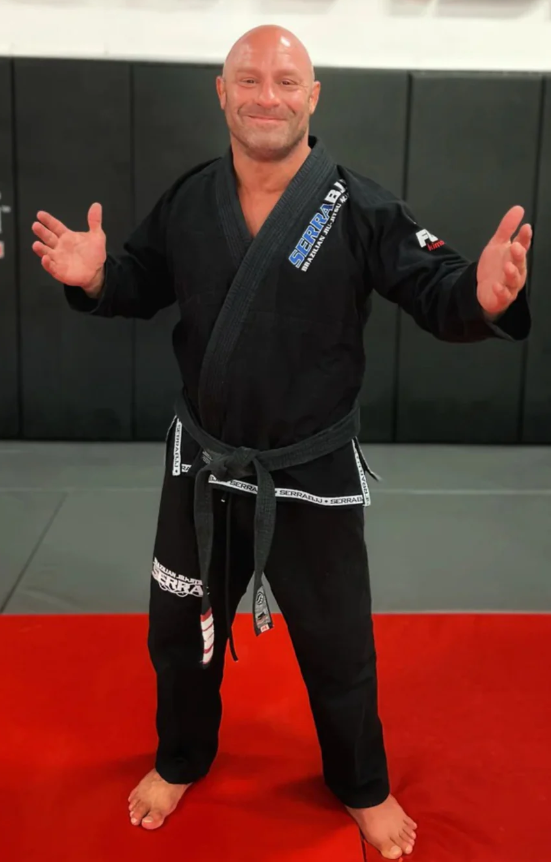
- Serra in 2024
- Born: June 2, 1974 (age 52); East Meadow, New York, U.S.
- Nickname: The Terror
- Height: 5 ft 6 in (1.68 m)
- Weight: 170 lb (77 kg; 12 st 2 lb)
- Division: Welterweight (1997–2002, 2005–2010); Lightweight (2002–05)
- Reach: 68 in (173 cm)
- Style: Brazilian jiu-jitsu
- Stance: Orthodox
- Fighting out of: East Meadow, New York, United States
- Team: Serra-Longo Fight Team
- Rank: 5th degree black belt in Brazilian jiu-jitsu under Renzo Gracie
- Years active: 1997–2010

Mixed martial arts record
- Total: 18
- Wins: 11
- By knockout: 2
- By submission: 5
- By decision: 4
- Losses: 7
- By knockout: 2
- By decision: 5

Other information
- Occupation: Entrepreneur and Coach
- Notable relatives: Nick Serra, brother
- Mixed martial arts record from Sherdog

Matt Serra (born June 2, 1974) is an American former professional mixed martial artist and Brazilian Jiu-Jitsu practitioner. He is a former UFC Welterweight Champion. He is the co-star of Dana White: Lookin' for a Fight and co-host of the official podcast of the UFC, UFC Unfiltered, alongside Jim Norton.

Serra defeated Pete Spratt, Shonie Carter and Chris Lytle en route to becoming The Ultimate Fighter 4 Welterweight Tournament Winner. He captured the UFC Welterweight Championship immediately after. Serra also served as the head coach for The Ultimate Fighter 6 reality show opposite Matt Hughes, and he is a member of the UFC Hall of Fame. In grappling, Serra holds a Silver Medal in the ADCC Submission Wrestling World Championship.

Serra began practicing martial arts at an early age, starting with Wing Chun. In the 1990s, he began training Brazilian Jiu-Jitsu under Renzo Gracie. In 2000 he became the first American to be promoted to black belt by Gracie. In addition to competitive bouts with UFC Hall of Famers Hughes and B.J. Penn, Serra's biggest accomplishment in mixed martial arts came at UFC 69 where he defeated Georges St-Pierre in a Knockout of the Night award-winning performance to capture the UFC Welterweight Championship.

== Background ==
Serra was born to an Italian-American family in East Meadow, New York. His father is a retired policeman in New York City and his late mother was a stay-at-home mom. Serra has an older sister and brother, and two younger brothers. Serra's father was enthusiastic about mixed martial arts, and Matt first began Wing Chun at an early age. As a teenager he began competing in wrestling.

Serra went to East Meadow High School, while in high school he enrolled in the United States Marine Corps Delayed Entry Program. In 1991 Serra got into a fight with the brother of a former girlfriend during which he bit the other boy’s ear. Serra received a felony charge, later changed to "disfigurement”. His Marines recruiting officer told him that the felony charge would keep him out of the Corps. After joining a Rorian and Royce Gracie seminar in Waterbury, Connecticut, he decided to learn Brazilian jiu-jitsu (BJJ). Serra trained under Craig Kukuk, the first American BJJ black belt, who at the time shared an academy with Renzo Gracie. In 2000 Serra became the first American to receive his BJJ black belt from Renzo Gracie.

=== Early career ===
==== Brazilian jiu-jitsu and submission grappling ====
Serra won first place at the Pan IBJJF Jiu-Jitsu Championship in 1999 and third place at the 2000 World IBJJF Jiu-Jitsu Championship in Brazil, in the brown belt division. Serra competed in the ADCC Submission Fighting World Championship choking out Takanori Gomi, winning a decision over Jean Jacques Machado, and placing 2nd in the 66–76 kg division. Serra decided to forfeit the final against his teammate Marcio Feitosa.

=== Ultimate Fighting Championship ===
Serra was invited to compete in PRIDE 9 against Johil de Oliveira but the bout was called off at the last minute when Oliveira was burned in a pyrotechnics accident backstage. Soon after, Serra began to compete in the UFC where he built up a record of four wins and four losses. One of the losses was a close decision fight with future Welterweight and Lightweight champion B.J. Penn which would have earned him a title shot in the failed Lightweight tournament.

==== The Ultimate Fighter ====
In 2006, Serra became a participant on The Ultimate Fighter 4: The Comeback on SpikeTV. On the show, Serra defeated Pete Spratt and Shonie Carter to reach the finals, his win against Carter avenging his infamous highlight-reel KO loss to Carter at UFC 31. On November 11, 2006, Serra defeated Chris Lytle at The Ultimate Fighter: The Comeback Finale by split decision to become the Ultimate Fighter 4 Welterweight Tournament Champion.

His win earned him a guaranteed title shot against Georges St-Pierre for the UFC Welterweight Championship, as well as a $100,000 contract and $100,000 sponsorship with Xyience.

==== Winning the welterweight title ====
Serra fought St-Pierre on April 7, 2007, at UFC 69, and won the UFC Welterweight Championship by TKO via punches at 3:25 in the first round. Prior to the fight Serra was considered a substantial underdog and consequently the fight is considered to be one of the biggest upsets in MMA history. This fight earned him his first Knockout of the Night award.

==== The Ultimate Fighter coach ====
Serra coached season 6 of The Ultimate Fighter reality show with Matt Hughes. Team Serra finished 6–2 in the first round of fights, winning six consecutive times which gave Serra the right to pick the fights in the second round. However, from then on Serra did not corner a single fighter to victory and saw all his trainees eventually lose out. The finale saw Team Hughes fighters Tommy Speer and Mac Danzig face each other for the title of Ultimate Fighter.

Serra said in season 6 of The Ultimate Fighter that Joe Scarola lost his job at Serra's jiu-jitsu school for quitting The Ultimate Fighter within the first week of the show. In exchange, Scarola opened his own academy which has created a feud among the two former friends. Relieving Scarola from his duties was difficult for Serra as the two were close friends, with Scarola serving as best man at Serra's wedding.

The two coaches were scheduled to face off for the UFC Welterweight Championship after the conclusion of the series at UFC 79. Serra, however, was forced to withdraw from the fight due to a herniated disc in his lower back. The injury became evident when Serra was demonstrating a move to his student and fell to the floor in excruciating pain. In Serra's place, Georges St-Pierre fought and defeated Hughes for what was then the interim UFC welterweight title. This led to Serra holding the welterweight title while St-Pierre held the interim title.

After St-Pierre vs Hughes at UFC 79, Serra confirmed to NBC Sports that his back was rapidly improving. He announced that he was scheduled to fight Georges St-Pierre at the first event to take place in Canada, UFC 83. This match would unify the interim and lineal welterweight belts.

==== Rematch with St-Pierre, fight with Matt Hughes, and retirement ====
At UFC 83 on April 19, 2008, Serra fought Georges St-Pierre in a match to determine the undisputed welterweight champion during the UFC's first-ever event in Canada, at the Bell Centre in Montreal, Quebec. Instead of striking, St-Pierre pressed the action early with a takedown and kept mixing up his attack, never allowing Serra the chance to mount a significant offense. In the second round, St-Pierre continued his previous actions, forcing Serra into the turtle position and delivering repeated knees to Serra's midsection. When Serra was unable to improve his position or defend against the strikes, referee Yves Lavigne stopped the fight.

Serra suffered a unanimous decision loss to Matt Hughes at UFC 98. Serra hurt Hughes early on in the fight with an inadvertent head-butt and a follow-up flurry of hooks. However, Hughes recovered and went on to win a close decision. This fight earned him a Fight of the Night award. After the fight Hughes and Serra embraced each other and ended their feud.

At UFC 109, Serra defeated Frank Trigg via KO (punches) at 2:23 of the first round, awarding him Knockout of the Night Honors. Serra was rumored to be headlining UFC Fight Night 22 on April 17, 2010, versus Mike Swick, but the fight was turned down by Swick due to an arm injury.

At UFC 119 Serra fought Chris Lytle on September 25, 2010. Serra lost the fight via unanimous decision.

In an interview with Ariel Helwani at UFC 131 Serra addressed when or if he would be fighting in the UFC in the foreseeable future. Between the birth of his second child and the rigors of training (Serra himself confirmed that he weighed somewhere around 200 lbs. at interview time), he likened his current situation to that of Rocky Balboa in the sixth film of the series, saying that he still "had some stuff in the basement".

On May 22, 2013, Serra retired from MMA, stating he would only return to MMA again to fight at an event held at Madison Square Garden in New York City.

==== UFC Unfiltered ====
As of June 2016, Serra currently hosts the official UFC podcast UFC Unfiltered with comedian Jim Norton as co-host.

==== UFC Hall of Fame ====
On the 5th July 2018 Matt Serra was inducted into the UFC Hall of Fame Class of 2018 in the pioneer wing.

== Personal life ==
Matt and his wife Ann were married on May 26, 2007. The couple have two daughters born in February 2009 and April 2011.

Serra co-owns a Brazilian jiu-jitsu school in Huntington, New York. He currently trains with Ray Longo and trains fighters such as former UFC Middleweight Champion Chris Weidman, former UFC Bantamweight Champion Aljamain Sterling, Gian Villante, Pete Sell, Luke Cummo, and The Ultimate Fighter: Live Finalist Al Iaquinta. They fight under the Serra-Longo Fight Team. After being absent from Aljamain Sterling's corner for UFC 259, Serra announced that he would be retiring from cornerman duties moving forward, although he would still remain as head coach for Serra-Longo Fight Team.

== Instructor lineage ==
Jigoro Kano → Mitsuyo Maeda → Carlos Gracie, Sr. → Helio Gracie → Rolls Gracie → Carlos Gracie, Jr. → Renzo Gracie → Matt Serra

== Championships and accomplishments ==
=== Mixed martial arts ===
- Ultimate Fighting Championship
  - UFC Hall of Fame (Pioneer wing, Class of 2018)
  - UFC Welterweight Championship (One time)
    - First fighter to win both a The Ultimate Fighter Tournament and UFC Championship
  - The Ultimate Fighter 4 Welterweight Tournament Winner
  - Fight of the Night (One time) vs. Matt Hughes
  - Knockout of the Night (Two times) vs. Georges St-Pierre 1 and Frank Trigg
  - UFC Encyclopedia Awards
    - Fight of the Night (One time) vs. Yves Edwards
  - UFC.com Awards
    - 2007: Upset of the Year vs. Georges St-Pierre 1, Ranked #5 Knockout of the Year vs. Georges St-Pierre 1 & Ranked #9 Fighter of the Year
- Sports Illustrated
  - 2000s Upset of the Decade vs. Georges St-Pierre
  - 2000s Cinderella Story of the Decade vs. Georges St-Pierre
- Bleacher Report
  - 2000s Upset of the Decade vs. Georges St-Pierre
- Fight Matrix
  - Most Noteworthy Match of Year (2007) vs. Georges St-Pierre
  - Most Noteworthy Upset of Year (2007) vs. Georges St-Pierre
- Yahoo! Sports
  - Upset of the Decade Runner-up vs. Georges St-Pierre
- FIGHT! Magazine
  - 2007 Upset of the Year vs. Georges St-Pierre at UFC 69

=== Grappling credentials ===
- ADCC Submission Wrestling World Championship
  - 2000 ADCC Tournament Trials: Champion
  - 2001 ADCC 77 kg: Silver Medalist
    - Record of opponents:
    - Won: Takanori Gomi (sub), Jean Jacques Machado (pts), Leonardo Silva Dos Santos (sub)
    - Lost: Marcio Feitosa (forfeit)
- International Pro-Ams
  - 2000 Black Belt 77 kg (No-Gi): Silver Medalist
- World Jiu-Jitsu Championship
  - 2000 Brown Belt Medio: Bronze Medalist
- Pan-American Championships
  - 1999 Purple Belt Medio: Gold Medalist

== Mixed martial arts record ==
Professional record breakdown
18 matches	11 wins	7 losses
By knockout	2	2
By submission	5	0
By decision	4	5

Res.	Record	Opponent	Method	Event	Date	Round	Time	Location	Notes
Loss	11–7	Chris Lytle	Decision (unanimous)	UFC 119	September 25, 2010	3	5:00	Indianapolis, Indiana, United States	
Win	11–6	Frank Trigg	KO (punches)	UFC 109	February 6, 2010	1	2:23	Las Vegas, Nevada, United States	Knockout of the Night.
Loss	10–6	Matt Hughes	Decision (unanimous)	UFC 98	May 23, 2009	3	5:00	Las Vegas, Nevada, United States	Fight of the Night.
Loss	10–5	Georges St-Pierre	TKO (knees to the body)	UFC 83	April 19, 2008	2	4:45	Montreal, Quebec, Canada	Lost the UFC Welterweight Championship.
Win	10–4	Georges St-Pierre	TKO (punches)	UFC 69	April 7, 2007	1	3:25	Houston, Texas, United States	Won the UFC Welterweight Championship. Knockout of the Night.
Win	9–4	Chris Lytle	Decision (split)	The Ultimate Fighter: The Comeback Finale	November 11, 2006	3	5:00	Las Vegas, Nevada, United States	Won The Ultimate Fighter 4 Welterweight Tournament. UFC Welterweight title eliminator.
Loss	8–4	Karo Parisyan	Decision (unanimous)	UFC 53	June 4, 2005	3	5:00	Atlantic City, New Jersey, United States	Return to Welterweight.
Win	8–3	Ivan Menjivar	Decision (unanimous)	UFC 48	June 19, 2004	3	5:00	Las Vegas, Nevada, United States	
Win	7–3	Jeff Curran	Decision (unanimous)	UFC 46	January 31, 2004	3	5:00	Las Vegas, Nevada, United States	
Loss	6–3	Din Thomas	Decision (split)	UFC 41	February 28, 2003	3	5:00	Atlantic City, New Jersey, United States	Matt Serra was declared the winner in the Octagon. But a referee commented that he scored wrong giving Thomas the victory later.
Loss	6–2	B.J. Penn	Decision (unanimous)	UFC 39	September 27, 2002	3	5:00	Uncasville, Connecticut, United States	Lightweight Tournament Semifinal.
Win	6–1	Kelly Dullanty	Submission (triangle choke)	UFC 36	March 22, 2002	1	2:58	Las Vegas, Nevada, United States	Lightweight debut.
Win	5–1	Yves Edwards	Decision (majority)	UFC 33	September 28, 2001	3	5:00	Las Vegas, Nevada, United States	
Loss	4–1	Shonie Carter	KO (spinning back fist)	UFC 31	May 4, 2001	3	4:51	Atlantic City, New Jersey, United States	
Win	4–0	Greg Melisi	Submission (armbar)	VATV 11	February 24, 2001	1	0:46	Plainview, New York, United States	
Win	3–0	Jeff Telvi	Submission (guillotine choke)	VATV 7	January 29, 2000	1	0:30	Plainview, New York, United States	
Win	2–0	Graham Lewis	Submission (armbar)	VATV 6	August 21, 1999	1	1:04	Plainview, New York, United States	
Win	1–0	Khamzat Vitaev	Submission (rear-naked choke)	VATV 3	April 1, 1998	1	0:36	Plainview, New York, United States	

== Vale Tudo rules ==
Res.	Record	Opponent	Method	Event	Date	Round	Time	Location	Notes
Win	2–0	Scott Schultz	Submission (armbar)	New York Regional	April 7, 1999	1	3:35	Manhattan, New York, United States	Pancrase Rules
Win	1–0	Bob Smith	Decision (unanimous)	Bama Fight Night 1	April 24, 1997	1	10:00	Bayside Academy of Martial Arts in Elizabeth, New Jersey, United States	Open Weight

== ADCC submission grappling record ==
4 Matches, 3 Wins (2 Submissions), 1 Loss
Result	Rec.	Opponent	Method	Event	Division	Date	Location
Lose	3-1	(Brazil) Marcio Feitosa	Forfeit*	ADCC 2001	–77 kg	2001	(United Arab Emirates) Abu Dhabi
Win	3-0	(Brazil) Leonardo Silva Dos Santos	Submission (rear-naked choke)	ADCC 2001	–77 kg	2001	(United Arab Emirates) Abu Dhabi
Win	2-0	(Brazil) Jean Jacques Machado	Points	ADCC 2001	–77 kg	2001	(United Arab Emirates) Abu Dhabi
Win	1-0	(Japan) Takanori Gomi	Submission (rear-naked choke)	ADCC 2001	–77 kg	2001	(United Arab Emirates) Abu Dhabi

- Serra lost to Feitosa in what appeared to be a very controversial decision. It was tradition when two practitioners from the same school meet each other in a tournament, the lower ranking student in that school's hierarchy will generally forfeit the match out of respect.

== Pay-per-view bouts ==
No	Event	Fight	Date	Venue	City	PPV buys
1.	UFC 69	St-Pierre vs. Serra	7 April 2007	Toyota Center	Houston, Texas United States	400,000
2.	UFC 83	St-Pierre vs. Serra 2	19 April 2008	Bell Centre	Montreal, Quebec, Canada	530,000
3.	UFC 98	Hughes vs. Serra (CO)	23 May 2009	MGM Grand Garden Arena	Las Vegas, Nevada United States	635,000
Total sales						1,565,000

Preceded by Georges St-Pierre	7th UFC Welterweight Championship; April 7, 2007 – April 19, 2008	Succeeded by Georges St-Pierre
