= Pedro Rizzo =

Brazilian mixed martial arts fighter

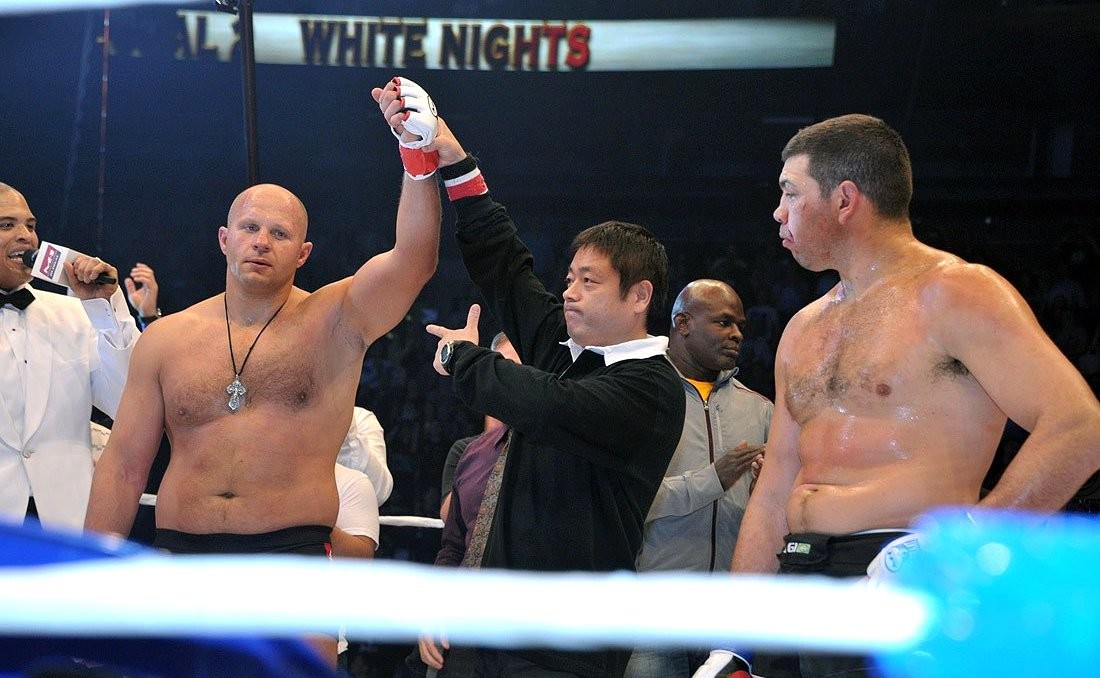
- Born: Pedro Augusto Rizzo; 3 May 1974 (age 52); Rio de Janeiro, Brazil
- Other names: The Rock
- Height: 6 ft 1 in (1.85 m)
- Weight: 244 lb (111 kg; 17 st 6 lb)
- Division: Heavyweight
- Reach: 77 in (196 cm)
- Style: Muay Thai, Luta Livre, Brazilian Jiu-Jitsu, Capoeira
- Stance: Orthodox
- Fighting out of: Rio de Janeiro, Brazil
- Team: Ruas Vale Tudo; Black House; American Top Team
- Teacher: Marco Ruas
- Rank: 4th Dan Black Belt in Luta Livre; Black Belt in Brazilian Jiu-Jitsu; Black Pra Jiad in Muay Thai; Black Cord in Capoeira
- Years active: 1996–2015 (MMA)

Kickboxing record
- Total: 34
- Wins: 31
- By knockout: 30
- Losses: 2
- By knockout: 2
- Draws: 1

Mixed martial arts record
- Total: 31
- Wins: 20
- By knockout: 15
- By submission: 1
- By decision: 4
- Losses: 11
- By knockout: 7
- By decision: 4

Other information
- Mixed martial arts record from Sherdog

Pedro Augusto Rizzo (Portuguese pronunciation: [ˈpedɾu ˈʁizu]; born 3 May 1974) is a Brazilian retired mixed martial artist and kickboxer who competed for the UFC, PRIDE, M-1 Global, and Affliction. Although he never captured the UFC Heavyweight Championship, Rizzo competed for it three times and was regarded as a top contender for many years. Coming from a Muay Thai background, Rizzo competed in Vale Tudo before transitioning into mixed martial arts. Often regarded as one of the most dangerous strikers in heavyweight history, Rizzo holds notable victories over former UFC champions Mark Coleman, Dan Severn, Josh Barnett, Andrei Arlovski, Ricco Rodriguez and Ken Shamrock.

== Mixed martial arts career ==
Early in his career, Rizzo adopted brutal leg kicks from his master trainer Marco Ruas and also from training at the Amsterdam-based Chakuriki gym. Pedro developed a strong stand-up style early on—and used this to great effect throughout his career.

Rizzo is a former World Vale Tudo Championship (WVC) Heavyweight Champion and former contender for the UFC heavyweight belt. Rizzo was almost an unstoppable force in his early UFC run, which culminated in a highly controversial loss at the hands of Randy Couture. The UFC heavyweight title fight between these fighters took place in Atlantic City on 4 May 2001, and Rizzo dominated the pace of the fight and punished Couture with heavy leg kicks, which at the conclusion of the bout, left Couture unable to exit the arena without assistance. After the judges read out the scores, even Couture's expression of disbelief assisted the public's reaction of a fight in which Rizzo was clearly robbed. Rizzo then had a chance to rematch Couture but was soundly beaten by Couture in this rematch, and after this fight, Rizzo's performances were mixed. Rizzo never seemed to recover from the controversial loss to Couture in that first fight, and this is what is believed to have taken the wind out of Rizzo's sails, as his hunger and drive were never the same as a consequence.

A stint in PRIDE FC did not go too well for the former UFC Heavyweight title contender, and Rizzo suffered quick losses at the hands of Sergei Kharitonov and Roman Zentsov.

Rizzo returned to his winning ways on 9 March 2007, when he beat UFC veteran Justin Eilers by unanimous decision at the début show of Art of War Undisputed Arena Fighting Championship, which was held in Dallas, Texas.

He defeated Jeff Monson on 1 September 2007. This fight took place on the first pay-per-view event promoted by the Art of War Undisputed Arena Fighting Championship organization. Rizzo was defeated at Affliction: Banned by Josh Barnett via knockout in round 2.

He was defeated by Gilbert Yvel at Ultimate Chaos: Lashley vs. Sapp via knockout in round 1. In his rematch with Jeff Monson, Rizzo won a decision at Bitetti Combat. He revealed in the post-fight interview that he had an elbow problem 10 days before the fight and that was why he could not push for the knockout that "the Brazilian fans deserved".

Rizzo also won his last two fights, against Gary Goodridge at Washington Combat and against eventual UFC Hall of Famer Ken Shamrock at Impact Fighting Championships in Australia.

He was expected to face former UFC Heavyweight Champion Tim Sylvia on 14 August at War on the Mainland but it was discovered that Sylvia broke his foot in his fight with Mariusz Pudzianowski.

Rizzo was expected to be the main event against Tim Sylvia at ProElite 2 in November, However he pulled out of the bout due to an injury.

On 21 June 2012, Rizzo faced former PRIDE Heavyweight Champion Fedor Emelianenko, at M-1 Global ring in St. Petersburg, Russia. Rizzo got caught by a right hand from Fedor that knocked him down; Fedor then proceeded with punches that left Rizzo motionless at 1:24 of the first round.

On 26 May 2013, Pedro faced Japanese heavyweight Satoshi Ishii at IGF: GENOME 26. He lost via unanimous decision.

On 12 September 2015, Pedro returned to face Andrew Flores at Face to Face 12. He won via leg kicks, forcing Flores to quit in between rounds, and Rizzo announced his retirement shortly after the fight.

== Personal life ==
Rizzo has a daughter.

== Championships and accomplishments ==
=== Mixed martial arts ===
- Ultimate Fighting Championship
  - UFC Encyclopedia Awards
    - Fight of the Night (Three times) vs. Tra Telligman, Josh Barnett and Randy Couture 1
    - Knockout of the Night (Two times) vs. Tsuyoshi Kosaka and Andrei Arlovski
- Art of War Undisputed Arena Fighting Championship
  - IFA Heavyweight Championship (1 Time)
- World Vale Tudo Championship
  - WVC Superfight Championship (1 Time)
  - WVC 2 Tournament Winner
- Wrestling Observer Newsletter
  - Fight of the Year (2001) vs. Randy Couture on 4 May

== Mixed martial arts record ==
Professional record breakdown
31 matches	20 wins	11 losses
By knockout	15	7
By submission	1	0
By decision	4	4

Res.	Record	Opponent	Method	Event	Date	Round	Time	Location	Notes
Win	20–11	Andrew Flores Smith	TKO (leg kicks)	Face to Face 12	12 September 2015	1	5:00	Espírito Santo, Brazil	
Loss	19–11	Satoshi Ishii	Decision (unanimous)	IGF: Genome 26	26 May 2013	3	5:00	Tokyo, Japan	
Loss	19–10	Fedor Emelianenko	KO (punches)	M-1 Global: Fedor vs. Rizzo	21 June 2012	1	1:24	St. Petersburg, Russia	
Win	19–9	Ken Shamrock	TKO (leg kicks and punches)	Impact FC 2	18 July 2010	1	3:33	Sydney, Australia	
Win	18–9	Gary Goodridge	TKO (doctor stoppage)	Washington Combat: Battle of the Legends	15 May 2010	2	5:00	Washington D.C. United States	
Win	17–9	Jeff Monson	Decision (unanimous)	Bitetti Combat MMA 4	12 Sep 2009	3	5:00	Rio de Janeiro, Brazil	
Loss	16–9	Gilbert Yvel	KO (punches)	Ultimate Chaos: Lashley vs. Sapp	27 Jun 2009	1	2:10	Biloxi, Mississippi, United States	
Loss	16–8	Josh Barnett	KO (punch)	Affliction: Banned	19 Jul 2008	2	1:44	Anaheim, California, United States	
Win	16–7	Jeff Monson	TKO (punches)	Art of War 3	1 September 2007	3	2:40	Dallas, Texas, United States	Defended the IFA Heavyweight Championship.
Win	15–7	Justin Eilers	Decision (unanimous)	Art of War 1	9 March 2007	3	5:00	Dallas, Texas, United States	Won the vacant IFA Heavyweight Championship.
Loss	14–7	Roman Zentsov	KO (punch)	PRIDE 31	26 February 2006	1	0:25	Saitama, Japan	
Loss	14–6	Sergei Kharitonov	TKO (soccer kick and punches)	PRIDE Critical Countdown 2005	26 June 2005	1	2:02	Saitama, Japan	
Win	14–5	Ricco Rodriguez	Decision (unanimous)	UFC 45	21 November 2003	3	5:00	Uncasville, Connecticut, United States	
Win	13–5	Tra Telligman	TKO (doctor stoppage)	UFC 43	6 June 2003	2	4:24	Las Vegas, Nevada, United States	
Loss	12–5	Vladimir Matyushenko	Decision (unanimous)	UFC 41	28 February 2003	3	5:00	Atlantic City, New Jersey, United States	
Loss	12–4	Gan McGee	TKO (corner stoppage)	UFC 39	27 September 2002	1	5:00	Uncasville, Connecticut, United States	
Win	12–3	Andrei Arlovski	KO (punches)	UFC 36	22 March 2002	3	1:45	Las Vegas, Nevada, United States	
Loss	11–3	Randy Couture	TKO (punches)	UFC 34	2 November 2001	3	1:38	Las Vegas, Nevada, United States	For the UFC Heavyweight Championship.
Loss	11–2	Randy Couture	Decision (Unanimous)	UFC 31	4 May 2001	5	5:00	Atlantic City, New Jersey, United States	For the UFC Heavyweight Championship. Fight of the Year (2001).
Win	11–1	Josh Barnett	KO (punch)	UFC 30	23 February 2001	2	4:21	Atlantic City, New Jersey, United States	
Win	10–1	Dan Severn	TKO (submission to leg kicks)	UFC 27	22 September 2000	1	1:33	New Orleans, Louisiana, United States	
Loss	9–1	Kevin Randleman	Decision (unanimous)	UFC 26	9 June 2000	5	5:00	Cedar Rapids, Iowa, United States	For the UFC Heavyweight Championship.
Win	9–0	Tsuyoshi Kohsaka	TKO (punches)	UFC 23	19 November 1999	3	1:12	Tokyo, Japan	
Win	8–0	Tra Telligman	KO (punch)	UFC 20	7 May 1999	1	4:30	Birmingham, Alabama, United States	
Win	7–0	Mark Coleman	Decision (split)	UFC 18	8 January 1999	1	15:00	Kenner, Louisiana, United States	
Win	6–0	Tank Abbott	KO (punch)	UFC Brazil	16 October 1998	1	8:07	Sao Paulo, Brazil	
Win	5–0	Richard Heard	TKO (submission to punches)	World Vale Tudo Championship 3	19 January 1997	1	13:12	Brazil	
Win	4–0	Vernon White	KO (soccer kick)	World Vale Tudo Championship 2	10 November 1996	1	6:30	Brazil	
Win	3–0	Michael Tielrooy	Submission (keylock)	World Vale Tudo Championship 2	10 November 1996	1	0:18	Brazil	
Win	2–0	Nicholas Hill (as Niccolaus)	TKO (submission to punches)	World Vale Tudo Championship 2	10 November 1996	1	1:49	Brazil	
Win	1–0	Eric Labaille	TKO (punches)	IMA: Battle of Styles	26 October 1996	1	2:57	Netherlands	

== Kickboxing record (incomplete) ==
Kickboxing Record(incomplete)
31 Win (30 (T)KO, 1 decisions), 2 Losses, 1 Draw
Date	Result	Opponent	Event	Location	Method	Round	Time	Record
11 May 1997	Loss	(Suriname) Lloyd van Dams	Nikko T. Press Productions: Battle of the Best	(Netherlands) 's-Hertogenbosch, North Brabant	TKO (Corner Stoppage)	2		
Battle of the Best Heavyweight Tournament Final.
11 May 1997	Win	(Netherlands) Rob van Esdonk	Nikko T. Press Productions: Battle of the Best	(Netherlands) 's-Hertogenbosch, North Brabant	TKO (Corner Stoppage)	3		
Battle of the Best Heavyweight Tournament Semifinal.
11 May 1997	Win	(Netherlands) Orlando Breienburg	Nikko T. Press Productions: Battle of the Best	(Netherlands) 's-Hertogenbosch, North Brabant	Decision (Unanimous)	3	3:00	
Battle of the Best Heavyweight Tournament Quarterfinal.
9 December 1995	Loss	(England) Michael Thompson	K-1 Hercules '95	(Japan) Nagoya, Aichi	TKO (Doctor Stoppage)	3	1:19	14-1
Legend: Win Loss Draw/No contest Notes

== See also ==
- List of male mixed martial artists
