= UFC 46 =

UFC mixed martial arts event in 2004

UFC 46: Supernatural
- The poster for UFC 46: Supernatural
- Promotion: Ultimate Fighting Championship
- Date: January 31, 2004
- Venue: Mandalay Bay Events Center
- City: Las Vegas, Nevada
- Attendance: 10,700
- Total gate: $1,377,000
- Buyrate: 80,000
- Total purse: $540,500

Event chronology
| UFC 45: Revolution | UFC 46: Supernatural | UFC 47: It's On! |

UFC 46: Supernatural was a mixed martial arts event held by the Ultimate Fighting Championship on January 31, 2004, at the Mandalay Bay Events Center in Las Vegas, Nevada. The event was broadcast live on pay-per-view in the United States, and later released on DVD.

== History ==
Headlining the card was a UFC Light Heavyweight Championship bout between Randy Couture and Vitor Belfort. The evening marked the UFC debut of future welterweight champion Georges St-Pierre.

== Results ==
Main Card
| Weight class | | | | Method | Round | Time | Notes |
|---|---|---|---|---|---|---|---|
| Light Heavyweight | Vitor Belfort | def. | Randy Couture (c) | TKO (doctor stoppage) | 1 | 0:49 | (Note: For the UFC Light Heavyweight Championship.) |
| Welterweight | B.J. Penn | def. | Matt Hughes (c) | Submission (rear-naked choke) | 1 | 4:39 | (Note: For the UFC Welterweight Championship.) |
| Heavyweight | Frank Mir | def. | Wes Sims | KO (knee and punches) | 2 | 4:21 |
| Catchweight (175 lb) | Renato Verissimo | def. | Carlos Newton | Decision (unanimous) (30–27, 30–27, 30–27) | 3 | 5:00 |
| Middleweight | Lee Murray | def. | Jorge Rivera | Submission (triangle armbar) | 1 | 1:45 |
Preliminary card
| Welterweight | Georges St-Pierre | def. | Karo Parisyan | Decision (unanimous) (29–28, 30–27, 30–27) | 3 | 5:00 |
| Lightweight | Josh Thomson | def. | Hermes França | Decision (unanimous) (29–28, 29–28, 29–28) | 3 | 5:00 |
| Lightweight | Matt Serra | def. | Jeff Curran | Decision (unanimous) (30–27, 30–27, 30–27) | 3 | 5:00 |

== Fighter Payouts ==
The total fighter payroll for UFC 46 was $540,500.

- Vitor Belfort: $130,000 ($100,000 for fighting; $30,000 win bonus)
- Randy Couture: $120,000 ($120,000 for fighting; win bonus would have been $80,000)
- Frank Mir: $90,000 ($60,000 for fighting; $30,000 win bonus)
- Matt Hughes: $55,000 ($55,000 for fighting; win bonus would have been $55,000)
- B.J. Penn: $50,000 ($25,000 for fighting; $25,000 win bonus)
- Carlos Newton: $30,000 ($30,000 for fighting; win bonus would have been $0)
- Matt Serra: $16,000 ($8,000 for fighting; $8,000 win bonus)
- Renato Verissimo: $10,000 ($5,000 for fighting; $5,000 win bonus)
- Josh Thomson: $8,000 ($4,000 for fighting; $4,000 win bonus)
- Lee Murray: $6,000 ($3,000 for fighting; $3,000 win bonus)
- Georges St-Pierre: $6,000 ($3,000 for fighting; $3,000 win bonus)
- Hermes Franca: $6,000 ($6,000 for fighting; win bonus would have been $6,000)
- Wes Sims: $5,000 ($5,000 for fighting, win bonus would have been $5,000)
- Jorge Rivera: $3,000 ($3,000 for fighting; win bonus would have been $3,000)
- Karo Parisyan: $3,000 ($3,000 for fighting; win bonus would have been $3,000)
- Jeff Curran: $2,500 ($2,500 for fighting; win bonus would have been $2,000)

== Encyclopedia awards ==
The following fighters were honored in the October 2011 book titled UFC Encyclopedia.

- Fight of the Night: Georges St-Pierre vs. Karo Parisyan
- Knockout of the Night: Frank Mir
- Submission of the Night: B.J. Penn

== See also ==
- Ultimate Fighting Championship
- List of UFC champions
- List of UFC events
- 2004 in UFC
