= UFC 43 =

UFC mixed martial arts event in 2003

UFC 43: Meltdown
- The poster for UFC 43: Meltdown
- Promotion: Ultimate Fighting Championship
- Date: June 6, 2003
- Venue: Thomas and Mack Center
- City: Las Vegas, Nevada
- Attendance: 9,800
- Total gate: $645,140
- Buyrate: 49,000

Event chronology
UFC 42: Sudden Impact	UFC 43: Meltdown	UFC 44: Undisputed

UFC 43: Meltdown was a mixed martial arts event held by the Ultimate Fighting Championship on June 6, 2003, at the Thomas and Mack Center in Las Vegas, Nevada. The event was broadcast live on pay-per-view in the United States, and later released on DVD.

== History ==
Headlining the card was an Interim Light Heavyweight Championship match between future UFC Hall of Fame inductees Randy Couture and Chuck Liddell. This was the first interim title fight in UFC history.

Ken Shamrock was originally slated to face Ian Freeman at this event, but was forced from the card with a torn ACL. Vernon White would step in as his replacement.

== Results ==
Main Card
Weight class				Method	Round	Time	Notes
Light Heavyweight	Randy Couture	def.	Chuck Liddell	TKO (punches)	3	2:39	(Note: For the interim UFC Light Heavyweight Championship. Couture becomes the first person to win a title in two different weight divisions (Couture was a two-time Heavyweight Champion).)
Heavyweight	Kimo Leopoldo	def.	Tank Abbott	Submission (arm-triangle choke)	1	1:59
Light Heavyweight	Vitor Belfort	def.	Marvin Eastman	TKO (knees and punches)	1	1:07
Heavyweight	Vernon White	vs.	Ian Freeman	Draw (split) (28–29, 30–27, 29–29)	3	5:00
Heavyweight	Frank Mir	def.	Wes Sims	DQ (kicking a downed opponent)	1	2:55
Preliminary card
Heavyweight	Pedro Rizzo	def.	Tra Telligman	TKO (doctor stoppage)	2	4:24
Middleweight	Falaniko Vitale	def.	Matt Lindland	KO (slam)	1	1:56
Lightweight	Yves Edwards	def.	Eddie Ruiz	Decision (unanimous) (30–27, 30–27, 30–27)	3	5:00

== Encyclopedia awards ==
The following fighters were honored in the October 2011 book titled UFC Encyclopedia.

- Fight of the Night: Randy Couture vs. Chuck Liddell
- Knockout of the Night: Vitor Belfort
- Submission of the Night: Kimo Leopoldo

== See also ==
- Ultimate Fighting Championship
- List of UFC champions
- List of UFC events
- 2003 in UFC
