= Dave Strasser =

American martial artist

- Born: July 13, 1969 (age 57)
- Nationality: American
- Height: 5 ft 10 in (1.78 m)
- Weight: 167 lb (76 kg; 11.9 st)
- Division: Welterweight
- Fighting out of: Kenosha, Wisconsin, U.S.
- Team: Freestyle Academy
- Rank: Black Belt in Shidokan Karate
- Years active: 1996–2008

Mixed martial arts record
- Total: 37
- Wins: 25
- By knockout: 5
- By submission: 14
- By decision: 6
- Losses: 8
- By knockout: 1
- By submission: 5
- By decision: 2
- Draws: 4

Dave Strasser (born July 13, 1969) is a retired American mixed martial arts fighter who competed in the Welterweight division for the UFC, Shooto, M-1 Global, and Cage Rage. 14 of his 25 career wins came by way of submission.

== Background ==
Strasser competed in High School Wrestling, Collegiate Wrestling, Boxing, Shidokan Karate, and Brazilian Jiu-Jitsu. His studying of Full-Contact Karate led a six-month stay in Japan to train and compete.

== Mixed martial arts career ==
Strasser's second professional fight was a no-rules bout against a fighter making his professional debut, Travis Fulton. Strasser subdued the inexperienced Fulton with a choke hold from behind. Fulton would go on to become one of the most prolific fighters in mixed martial arts history, with over 300 recorded professional fights as of November 2011.

Strasser trained with Pat Miletich and Jeremy Horn from 1996-97.

=== UFC ===
At UFC 42, Strasser fought against Romie Aram. Aram had been undefeated before the fight, and was being groomed by the UFC for a possible title shot against Matt Hughes. As such, Aram came into the fight as the favorite. In the first round, Strasser was immediately dropped by a punch to the head, but he successfully pulled guard, and the referee stood the fighters up. Strasser scored a takedown later in the round, delivering punches and elbows from the top position. Strasser controlled the second round with standup striking, though Aram remained competitive. The fighters remained on their feet in the third round, with Aram delivering more powerful punches but Strasser displaying better precision. Strasser's blows in this round made Aram's nose bleed. All three judges scored the fight for Strasser, and he won by unanimous decision.

Strasser fought again in the UFC at UFC 44. In the welterweight match, his opponent was judo practitioner Karo Parisyan, who was making his debut in the UFC. Parisyan's status as a student of notable judokas Gene LeBell and Gokor Chivchyan increased fan interest in the bout, but the 21-year-old was still seen as a significant underdog. When the fight started, Strasser attempted to stay on his feet and exchange punches. Parisyan, however, performed a judo throw, which put Strasser on the ground and placed him in position for a kimura armlock, which Parisyan duly applied. As a result of the hold, Strasser submitted at 3:52 of the first round. This fight was notable, as judokas had not enjoyed many prior successes in MMA competitions, and Parisyan's win helped to establish judo as a viable martial arts style in MMA.

== Other ventures ==
Strasser has also worked as a mixed martial arts trainer and promoter. He runs a gym, Dave Strasser's Freestyle Academy, in Kenosha, Wisconsin. Nick Thompson, Jameel Massouh, and Ben Rothwell are among the fighters who have trained with Strasser.

== Personal life ==
Strasser comes from a very athletic family and has three brothers and two sisters. His father was an all-state sprinter and football player who was recruited by Miami University and other NCAA Division I schools. Strasser's uncle was a talented weightlifter, holding the state record for the squat and dead-lift. Strasser's siblings' accomplishments have ranged from a state finals champion in Cross Country, player of the year in baseball, all-state in basketball, NCAA Division I runner, among many other notable feats. One of his brothers, Mark, played professional football in Sweden and set Division I records for Central Connecticut State University. Mark went on to work for the Minnesota Twins organization. He is currently a physical education teacher Eleanor Roosevelt High School in New York City. Strasser now has a wife and one daughter and one son.

== Mixed martial arts record ==
Professional record breakdown
37 matches	25 wins	8 losses
By knockout	5	1
By submission	14	5
By decision	6	2
Draws	4	

Res.	Record	Opponent	Method	Event	Date	Round	Time	Location	Notes
Win	25–8–4	Steve Corley	Submission (injury)	FCC 34 – Freestyle Combat Challenge 34	March 29, 2008	1		Wisconsin, United States	
Loss	24–8–4	Paul Daley	Decision (unanimous)	Cage Rage 16	April 22, 2006	3	5:00	London, England	
Win	24–7–4	Emyr Bussade	Decision	MFC – Boardwalk Blitz	March 4, 2006	3	5:00	New Jersey, United States	
Win	23–7–4	Derrick Reed	Submission	LOF 2 – Legends of Fighting 2	October 21, 2005	1		Indiana, United States	
Loss	22–7–4	Hidetaka Monma	KO (punch)	GCM – D.O.G. 2	June 11, 2005	1	3:30	Tokyo, Japan	
Win	22–6–4	Brian Dunn	TKO	FCC 19 – Freestyle Combat Challenge 19	May 14, 2005	N/A		Wisconsin, United States	
Loss	21–6–4	Georges St-Pierre	Submission (kimura)	TKO 19 – Rage	January 29, 2005	1	1:52	Quebec, Canada	
Win	21–5–4	Pat Healy	Decision (unanimous)	MT 1 – Madtown Throwdown 1	August 21, 2004	N/A		Wisconsin, United States	
Loss	20–5–4	Ansar Chalangov	Submission (guillotine choke)	M-1 MFC - Russia vs. The World 7	December 5, 2003	1	0:53	St. Petersburg, Russia	
Loss	20–4–4	Karo Parisyan	Submission (kimura)	UFC 44	September 26, 2003	1	3:52	Nevada, United States	
Win	20–3–4	Romie Aram	Decision (unanimous)	UFC 42	April 25, 2003	3	5:00	Florida, United States	
Draw	19–3–4	Islam Karimov	Draw	M-1 MFC - Russia vs. the World 4	November 15, 2002	2	5:00	St. Petersburg, Russia	
Win	19–3–3	Seichi Ikemoto	Submission (rear naked choke)	Shooto - Treasure Hunt 7	June 29, 2002	1	3:10	Osaka, Japan	
Win	18–3–3	Takuya Wada	Decision (split)	Shooto - Treasure Hunt 6	May 5, 2002	3	5:00	Tokyo, Japan	
Win	17–3–3	Alexandre Barros	Decision	HOOKnSHOOT – Overdrive	March 9, 2002	3	5:00	Indiana, United States	
Loss	16–3–3	Ronald Jhun	Submission (armbar)	SB 21 – SuperBrawl 21	May 24, 2001	2	4:42	Hawaii, United States	
Draw	16–2–3	Chris Lytle	Draw	RSF 3 – Reality Submission Fighting 3	March 30, 2001	1	18:00	Illinois, United States	
Win	16–2–2	Steve Miller	TKO (cut)	IC 1 – Iowa Challenge 1	February 10, 2001	1		Iowa, United States	
Win	15–2–2	Riley McIlhon	Submission (strikes)	FCC 3 – Freestyle Combat Challenge 3	January 6, 2001	1	3:23		
Win	14–2–2	Paul Rodriguez	Decision (majority)	WEF 8 – Goin' Platinum	January 15, 2000	3	4:00	Georgia, United States	
Win	13–2–2	Eric Meaders	TKO	NG 13 – Neutral Grounds 13	November 20, 1999	2		California, United States	
Win	12–2–2	Toby Imada	Submission (armbar)	NG 13 – Neutral Grounds 13	November 20, 1999	1		California, United States	
Loss	11–2–2	Tom Schmitz	Submission (triangle choke)	EC 29 – Extreme Challenge 29	November 13, 1999	1	1:56	Wisconsin, United States	
Win	11–1–2	Sean Brockmole	TKO (guillotine choke)	EC 23 – Extreme Challenge 23	April 2, 1999	1	1:32	Indiana, United States	
Win	10–1–2	Jeff Lindsay	Submission (punches)	EC 23 – Extreme Challenge 23	April 2, 1999	1	3:01	Indiana, United States	
Win	9–1–2	Brian Campbell	Submission (keylock)	Gladiators 2 – Gladiators 2	March 18, 1999	1	12:20	Iowa, United States	
Loss	8–1–2	Adrian Serrano	Decision (split)	EC 13 – Extreme Challenge 13	January 16, 1998	1	20:00	Wisconsin, United States	
Win	8–0–2	Brett Al-azzawi	Submission (punches)	EC 12 – Extreme Challenge 12	December 13, 1997	1	3:55	Michigan, United States	
Win	7–0–2	Daniel Vianna	Submission (punches)	EC 12 – Extreme Challenge 12	December 13, 1997	1	8:59	Michigan, United States	
Win	6–0–2	Phil Johns	Submission (punches)	EC 11 – Extreme Challenge 11	November 22, 1997	1	8:39	Iowa, United States	
Draw	5–0–2	Adrian Serrano	Draw	EC 10 – Extreme Challenge 10	October 4, 1997	1	15:00	Iowa, United States	
Win	5–0–1	Jesse Jones	Submission (keylock)	EC 5 – Extreme Challenge 5	April 18, 1997	1	9:25	Iowa, United States	
Win	4–0–1	Caz Daniels	Submission (armbar)	EC 5 – Extreme Challenge 5	April 18, 1997	1	N/A	Iowa, United States	
Win	3–0–1	Rolando Higueros	TKO (cut)	EC 1 – Extreme Challenge 1	November 23, 1996	1	8:32	Iowa, United States	
Draw	2–0–1	George Schirmer	Draw	BATB 1 – Brawl at the Ballpark 1	September 1, 1996	1	15:00	Iowa, United States	
Win	2–0	Travis Fulton	Submission (rear naked choke)	Gladiators – Gladiators 1	July 26, 1996	1		Iowa, United States	
Win	1–0	CG Sierra	Submission (rear naked choke)	QCU 2 – Quad City Ultimate 2	May 11, 1996	1	1:40	Illinois, United States	
