= UFC 39 =

UFC mixed martial arts event in 2002

UFC 39: The Warriors Return
- The poster for UFC 39: The Warriors Return
- Promotion: Ultimate Fighting Championship
- Date: September 27, 2002
- Venue: Mohegan Sun Arena
- City: Uncasville, Connecticut
- Attendance: 7,800
- Buyrate: 45,000

Event chronology
| UFC 38: Brawl at the Hall | UFC 39: The Warriors Return | UFC 40: Vendetta |

UFC 39: The Warriors Return was a mixed martial arts event held by the Ultimate Fighting Championship on September 27, 2002, at the Mohegan Sun Arena in Uncasville, Connecticut. The event was broadcast live on pay per view in the United States, and was the first UFC event to be released on DVD.

== History ==
Headlining the event was a Heavyweight Title bout between Randy Couture and Ricco Rodriguez for the vacant title. Originally Ricco Rodriguez was scheduled to fight Josh Barnett for the UFC title but Barnett was stripped following a positive test for steroids.

The event marked the octagon debut of future UFC Heavyweight Champion Tim Sylvia. This fight saw Sylvia's opponent, Wesley Correira, take several straight punches, knees, and kicks to the head without ever falling before his corner eventually threw in the towel.

== Results ==
Main Card
| Weight class | | | | Method | Round | Time | Notes |
|---|---|---|---|---|---|---|---|
| Heavyweight | Ricco Rodriguez | def. | Randy Couture | TKO (submission due to elbows) | 5 | 3:04 | (Note: For the vacant UFC Heavyweight Championship.) |
| Heavyweight | Tim Sylvia | def. | Wesley Correira | TKO (corner stoppage) | 2 | 1:43 |
| Lightweight | B.J. Penn | def. | Matt Serra | Decision (unanimous) (29–28, 29–28, 29–28) | 3 | 5:00 | (Note: Lightweight Tournament Semifinal bout.) |
| Lightweight | Caol Uno | def. | Din Thomas | Decision (unanimous) (29–27, 29–27, 29–27) | 3 | 5:00 | (Note: Lightweight Tournament Semifinal bout.) |
| Heavyweight | Gan McGee | def. | Pedro Rizzo | TKO (corner stoppage) | 1 | 5:00 | (Note: Rizzo took a straight right hand to the nose with twelve seconds left in the first round. After examining Rizzo's nose between rounds, his corner decided to throw in the towel.) |
| Middleweight | Phil Baroni | def. | Dave Menne | KO (punches) | 1 | 0:18 |
Preliminary card
| Middleweight | Matt Lindland | def. | Ivan Salaverry | Decision (unanimous) (30–28, 29–28, 29–28) | 3 | 5:00 |
| Welterweight | Sean Sherk | def. | Benji Radach | TKO (doctor stoppage) | 1 | 4:16 |

== Lightweight tournament bracket ==
Semifinals
(United States) | B.J. Penn | UD
(United States) | Matt Serra | 3
(Japan) | Caol Uno | UD
(United States) | Din Thomas | 3

Finals (UFC 41)
(United States) | B.J. Penn | D^{1}
(Japan) | Caol Uno | 15:00

^{1} At UFC 41, B.J. Penn vs. Caol Uno ended in a split draw. (48-46, 47-48, 48-48). The title remained vacant.

== Encyclopedia awards ==
The following fighters were honored in the October 2011 book titled UFC Encyclopedia.

- Fight of the Night: Ricco Rodriguez vs. Randy Couture
- Knockout of the Night: Phil Baroni

== See also ==
- List of UFC champions
- List of UFC events
- 2002 in UFC
