= Wes Sims =

American martial artist

- Born: October 12, 1979 (age 47); Cleveland, Ohio, U.S.
- Other names: The Project (previously); A Whole Show (currently)
- Height: 6 ft 9 in (2.06 m)
- Weight: 258 lb (117 kg; 18 st 6 lb)
- Division: Heavyweight
- Reach: 81 in (206 cm)
- Stance: Orthodox
- Fighting out of: Lancaster, Ohio, United States
- Team: Team Hammer House
- Years active: 2001–2016

Mixed martial arts record
- Total: 42
- Wins: 24
- By knockout: 13
- By submission: 9
- By disqualification: 1
- Unknown: 1
- Losses: 15
- By knockout: 6
- By submission: 5
- By decision: 3
- By disqualification: 1
- Draws: 1
- No contests: 2

Other information
- Mixed martial arts record from Sherdog

Wesley Sims (born 12 October 1979) is a retired American professional mixed martial artist. A professional from 2001 until 2016, he competed in the UFC, the WEC, Strikeforce, K-1 and the IFL.

== Background ==
Sims was born in Cleveland and raised in Amanda, Ohio. He was a star center on the basketball team at Amanda-Clearcreek High School, and went on to Mount St. Joseph University in Cincinnati. However, he dropped out after only one semester to pursue a career in professional wrestling, moving back to Columbus to train. He soon met legendary UFC and PRIDE FC fighter Mark Coleman who had a better plan for the young Sims which was to become a mixed martial artist, believing that Sim's huge size advantage would be significant against opponents. Sims helped Coleman prepare for his bout with Ricardo Morais at PRIDE 8, before embarking on his own career in the sport.

Sims has been friends, since before UFC 47, and former training partners with former UFC Hall of Famer Mark Coleman and the deceased Kevin Randleman; they were all very close and described by MMA Weekly in an interview with Randleman, with Sims present, as the 3 Amigos. When Coleman was suffering from issues related to hip replacement injuries and training fighters on the Ultimate Fighter (he was the wrestling coach on B.J. Penn's team on The Ultimate Fighter: Team Edgar vs. Team Penn), Sims set up a GoFundMe page for Coleman without his knowledge to help pay him for his medical expenses. Thanks to Sims, donations raised over $51,000, including a $5,000 donation from fellow Pride FC and UFC fighter Mark Hunt, for Coleman's medical expenses, halfway meeting the goal of $100,000.

== Mixed martial arts career ==
=== Frank Mir rivalry ===
In 2003, Sims fought a controversial fight against Frank Mir at UFC 43. At the very beginning of the fight, Mir put out his hand to touch gloves and Sims rushed past Mir's outstretched hand and into a quickly maneuvered takedown by Mir. In the first round, after slamming Mir to prevent an armbar, Sims got up while Mir was on his back against the fence and proceeded to stomp Mir's face several times while holding the fence for extra balance. The fight was stopped and Sims was disqualified.

This started a rivalry between the two and they met again in 2004 at UFC 46. Mir easily took control of the first round with an arm triangle attempt. Near the end of the second round Mir hit Sims with knee strikes to the face and then punches to knock Sims out.

=== Mike Kyle bite incident ===
Sims fought again in the UFC at the UFC 47 against Mike Kyle. Sims took the fight on less than a weeks notice after Kyle's original opponent got injured. Kyle dominated the entire first round and knocked Sims out at 4:59. Sims protested after the fight that Kyle had bitten him on the chest. During the post fight interview, a bite mark could clearly be seen on Sims' left pectoral muscle. This marked the first time a bite had happened in a UFC fight since UFC 1 in 1993, when Gerard Gordeau bit Royce Gracie in the championship match. When asked in the cage after the fight to explain the bite, Kyle told commentator Joe Rogan "he's a dirty bastard anyways, look at all the stuff he's done..." Kyle denied any wrongdoing.

After losing to Kyle he was released by the UFC.

=== Tim Sylvia rivalry ===
Wes Sims faced former UFC heavyweight champion Tim Sylvia at SuperBrawl 38. Sylvia was coming off a title loss against Frank Mir, a fight in which he broke his right arm and needed a titanium plate inserted. The two did not touch gloves and Wes began the fight by sprinting towards Sylvia and then backing away. Sylvia got a takedown early and passed through to mount almost right away, but accidentally mounted his knee on top of Sims' shoulder, seriously injuring it. Wes was unable to defend himself with the injury and Sylvia won by strikes in the first round. Tim and Wes had a heated exchange after the fight when Sylvia called Sims out and said he did not deserve to stand in front of him. Wes ran up to Sylvia and trainers had to separate the two. Wes and Tim were supposed to have their rematch for the International Fighting Championships (IFC) Heavyweight title June 6 but Sylvia was injured and the fight was cancelled.

=== The Ultimate Fighter ===
Sims returned to the UFC as a cast member on the tenth season of The Ultimate Fighter, which began filming in June 2009. Sims was defeated by castmate Justin Wren via arm triangle in the first round of Sims' first fight in the house. Despite his early exit from the competition, Sims was seen regularly on the show and may have earned a reputation for being one of the bullies of the household due to his constant childlike taunting of Matt Mitrione and Zak Jensen.

=== Strikeforce ===
Sims made his Strikeforce debut against Bobby Lashley on January 30, 2010, at Strikeforce: Miami. Sims came up short and was defeated by Bobby Lashley by TKO. Sims was taken down at the beginning of the first round by the decorated wrestler, who then used the ground and pound technique on the 6'8 UFC veteran. The referee stopped to the fight much to the dismay of Sims, who believed that the stoppage was premature. Sims was expected to fight former UFC Heavyweight Champion Tim Sylvia in Ohio outside of Strikeforce but the Ohio State Athletic Commission did not sanction the bout, citing that the fight was "non-competitive".

== Mixed martial arts record ==
Professional record breakdown
42 matches	24 wins	15 losses
By knockout	13	6
By submission	9	5
By decision	0	3
By disqualification	1	1
Unknown	1	0
Draws	1	
No contests	2	

Res.	Record	Opponent	Method	Event	Date	Round	Time	Location	Notes
Loss	24–15–1 (2)	George Oiler	Submission (armbar)	Dugout Summer Throwdown	August 13, 2016	1	2:15	Parkersburg, West Virginia, United States	
Win	24–14–1 (2)	Ruben Villareal	Submission (guillotine choke)	Gladiator Challenge: Hammer Time	September 1, 2013	1	0:37	Lincoln, California, United States	
Loss	23–14–1 (2)	Lyubomir Simeonov	Submission (heel hook)	Maxfight 27	June 16, 2012	2	1:05	Sofia, Bulgaria	Simeonov was given more than the allowed time to recover on the stool in between rounds 1 & 2.
Loss	23–13–1 (2)	Bobby Lashley	TKO (punches)	Strikeforce: Miami	January 30, 2010	1	2:06	Sunrise, Florida, United States	
Win	23–12–1 (2)	Jason DeAngelo	KO (punches)	FCFS 29: Battlefield 2	November 28, 2008	1	0:18	Fort Wayne, Indiana, United States	
Win	22–12–1 (2)	Clifford Coon	Submission (kneebar)	FCFS 26: Beach-N-Brawl	June 28, 2008	1	1:32	Fort Wayne, Indiana, United States	
Win	21–12–1 (2)	William Clifford	Submission (guillotine choke)	FCFS 26: Beach-N-Brawl	June 28, 2008	1	2:12	Fort Wayne, Indiana, United States	
Loss	20–12–1 (2)	Steve Bossé	Submission (toe hold)	TKO 34: Sims VS Bosse	June 7, 2008	1	3:05	Montreal, Quebec, Canada	
Loss	20–11–1 (2)	Travis Fulton	Decision (unanimous)	FF: Capitol Punishment	September 29, 2007	3	5:00	Columbus, Ohio, United States	
Loss	20–10–1 (2)	Chris Guillen	TKO (corner stoppage)	IFO: Fireworks in the Cage	July 7, 2007	2	5:00	Las Vegas, Nevada, United States	
Win	20–9–1 (2)	Daniel Long	TKO (punches)	FCFS 12: Bloodsport	June 16, 2007	1	4:01	Fort Wayne, Indiana, United States	
Loss	19–9–1 (2)	Chris Guillen	Decision (unanimous)	UAFC: Art of War 2	May 11, 2007	3	5:00	Dallas, Texas, United States	
NC	19–8–1 (2)	Van Palacio	NC	PFC 2: Fast and Furious	March 22, 2007	1	0:54	Lemoore, California, United States	
Win	19–8–1 (1)	William Jaggers	TKO (submission to punches)	FCFS 7: Fight Club	February 10, 2007	1	0:28	Fort Wayne, Indiana, United States	
Win	18–8–1 (1)	Albert Palmer	TKO (submission to punches)	FOG: Fists of Furry	December 9, 2006	1	0:54	Richmond, Indiana, United States	
Win	17–8–1 (1)	Anton Cano	DQ (groin kick)	MMA: Mexico	October 27, 2006	2	0:08	Monterrey, Mexico	
Win	16–8–1 (1)	Kimo Leopoldo	TKO (referee stoppage)	Extreme Wars 5: Battlegrounds	October 6, 2006	1	1:13	Honolulu, Hawaii, United States	
Win	15–8–1 (1)	Robert Hogan	KO (punches)	FCFS 3: Full Contact Fight Series	September 16, 2006	1	1:07	Auburn, Indiana, United States	
Win	14–8–1 (1)	Jabari Hawthorne	KO (knees)	HHCF 27: Rumble at the Rodeo 2	September 2, 2006	1	0:36	Chillicothe, Ohio, United States	
Win	13–8–1 (1)	Joel Surprenant	Submission (triangle choke)	WEC 22: The Hitmen	July 28, 2006	1	0:28	Lemoore, California, United States	
Win	12–8–1 (1)	Paul Bowers	Submission	UFS 2: Ultimate Fight Series 2	June 17, 2006	1	0:39	Auburn, Indiana, United States	
Loss	11–8–1 (1)	Daniel Gracie	Technical Submission (standing rear-naked choke)	IFL: Championship 2006	June 3, 2006	1	2:42	Atlantic City, New Jersey, United States	
Win	11–7–1 (1)	Buddy Butler	TKO (submission to punches)	UFS: Ultimate Fight Series	April 15, 2006	1	0:50	Auburn, Indiana, United States	
Draw	10–7–1 (1)	Daniel Gracie	Technical Draw	GFC: Team Gracie vs Team Hammer House	March 3, 2006	2	5:00	Columbus, Ohio, United States	
Win	10–7 (1)	Jyunpei Hamada	Submission (triangle choke)	RFN 2: Ryukyu Fight Night 2	November 13, 2005	1	3:07	Okinawa, Japan	
Win	9–7 (1)	Dustin Sutton	TKO (punches)	HHCF 22: Rumble at the Rodeo	September 3, 2005	1	0:36	Chillicothe, Ohio, United States	
Win	8–7 (1)	Shane Lightle	KO (punch)	HHCF 21: Redemption	August 26, 2005	1	1:54	Columbus, Ohio, United States	
Loss	7–7 (1)	Tim Sylvia	TKO (punches)	SB 38: SuperBrawl 38	December 12, 2004	1	1:32	Honolulu, Hawaii, United States	
Loss	7–6 (1)	Antoni Hardonk	Submission (americana)	K-1 Fighting Network Rumble on the Rock 2004	November 20, 2004	1	4:24	Honolulu, Hawaii, United States	
Win	7–5 (1)	Joe Mellotte	TKO (submission to punches)	EFC 9: Extreme Fighting Challenge 9	September 10, 2004	1	1:00	Cleveland, Ohio, United States	
Loss	6–5 (1)	Ricardeau Francois	TKO (punches)	APEX: Genesis	September 5, 2004	2	0:26	Montreal, Quebec, Canada	
Loss	6–4 (1)	Mike Kyle	KO (punch)	UFC 47	April 2, 2004	1	4:59	Las Vegas, Nevada, United States	
Loss	6–3 (1)	Frank Mir	KO (knee and punches)	UFC 46	January 31, 2004	2	4:21	Las Vegas, Nevada, United States	
Loss	6–2 (1)	Frank Mir	DQ (kicking a downed opponent)	UFC 43	June 6, 2003	1	2:55	Las Vegas, Nevada, United States	
Win	6–1 (1)	Conan Silveira	TKO (punches)	HOOKnSHOOT: Absolute Fighting Championships 1	December 13, 2002	2	2:13	Fort Lauderdale, Florida, United States	
NC	5–1 (1)	Edwin Allseitz	NC	HHCF 3: Unfinished Fury	October 19, 2002	N/A	N/A	Lancaster, Ohio, United States	
Win	5–1	Mike Shepard	Submission (guillotine choke)	WEF 12: World Extreme Fighting 12	May 11, 2002	1	3:00	Steubenville, Ohio, United States	
Win	4–1	John Harmon	Submission (triangle choke)	HHCF 1: Backyard Brawl	May 4, 2002	1	N/A	Lancaster, Ohio, United States	
Win	3–1	Joe Mellotte	Submission (triangle choke)	OCF: Ohio Cage Fights	March 23, 2002	N/A	N/A	Delaware, Ohio, United States	
Win	2–1	Josh Mueller	N/A	UW: St. Cloud 1	May 15, 2002	1	1:18	St. Cloud, Minnesota, United States	
Win	1–1	Mike Paduano	TKO (forfeit)	RSF 7: Animal Instinct	January 26, 2002	1	0:01	Lakeland, Florida, United States	
Loss	0–1	Dan Severn	Decision	RSF 2: Attack at the Track	June 23, 2001	3	4:00	Chester, West Virginia, United States	

=== Mixed martial arts exhibition record ===
Exhibition record breakdown		
1 match	0 wins	1 loss
By submission	0	1

Res.	Record	Opponent	Method	Event	Date	Round	Time	Location	Notes
Lose	0–1	Justin Wren	Technical Submission (arm-triangle choke)	The Ultimate Fighter: Heavyweights	N/A	1	N/A	Las Vegas, Nevada	Preliminary bout.

== See also ==
- List of male mixed martial artists
