= Tim Sylvia =

American professional wrestler and mixed martial arts fighter

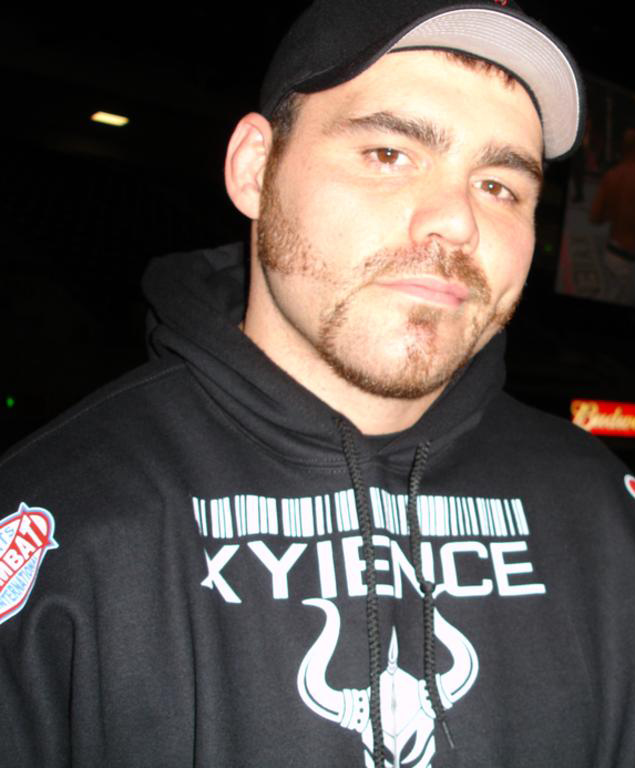
- Born: Timothy Deane Sylvia; March 5, 1976 (age 50); Ellsworth, Maine, U.S.
- Other names: The Maine-iac
- Height: 6 ft 8 in (203 cm)
- Weight: 265 lb (120 kg; 18 st 13 lb)
- Division: Heavyweight (2001–2008, 2011–2015); Super Heavyweight (2009–2011, 2013)
- Reach: 79 in (200 cm)
- Fighting out of: Pleasant Valley, Iowa, U.S.
- Team: American Top Team (2013–2015); Miletich Fighting Systems (2001–2009); Team Wolfpack (2009–2012)
- Rank: Brown belt in Brazilian Jiu-Jitsu
- Years active: 2001–2015 (MMA)

Mixed martial arts record
- Total: 42
- Wins: 31
- By knockout: 22
- By submission: 2
- By decision: 7
- Losses: 10
- By knockout: 3
- By submission: 4
- By decision: 3
- No contests: 1

Other information
- Mixed martial arts record from Sherdog

Timothy Deane Sylvia (born March 5, 1976) is an American retired mixed martial arts (MMA) fighter, professional wrestler, and a former two-time UFC Heavyweight Champion. He has competed as a Super Heavyweight and Heavyweight. While he is best known for competing in the UFC, Sylvia has also fought for Affliction, the International Fighting Championships (IFC), and ONE FC.

== Background ==
Sylvia was born and raised in Ellsworth, Maine, attending Ellsworth High School and graduating in 1992. He joined a karate school as a child, and began wrestling in high school. After graduation, he worked construction, community gardening, hanging sheet rock, as a bouncer, and painting houses. After high school, he played semi-pro football for three years before becoming interested in MMA, and began to train with Marcus Davis, a fellow bouncer. During this time Sylvia decided to take up boxing and grappling. After training for a year, and winning grappling tournaments, he got the opportunity to fight in a Rhode Island no holds barred amateur event, in which he knocked out his opponent in 17 seconds.

A longtime UFC fan, Sylvia and some friends attended UFC 28 in Atlantic City, New Jersey, in 2000. In late 2000 Sylvia sold all of his belongings and moved to Bettendorf, Iowa, to train with Team Miletich which had members such as former UFC champions Matt Hughes and Jens Pulver. Sylvia was promoted to a purple belt in Brazilian Jiu-Jitsu on October 31, 2011.

== Mixed martial arts career ==
=== Early professional career ===
Sylvia made his professional MMA debut in 2001 fighting for the IFC. He went on to rack up thirteen consecutive wins with ten knockouts in organizations such as the Hawaii-based SuperBrawl, and Extreme Challenge.

=== Ultimate Fighting Championship ===
In 2002, Sylvia signed with the Ultimate Fighting Championship and won a TKO victory over Wesley "Cabbage" Correira at UFC 39 when Correira's corner threw in the towel. Sylvia then went on to defeat Ricco Rodriguez at UFC 41, winning the UFC heavyweight championship for the first time. Soon after Sylvia defended his title with another quick victory over Gan McGee at UFC 44.

==== Controversy ====
After the fight with McGee, Sylvia tested positive for the banned substance Stanozolol. He voluntarily forfeited his title and was handed a six-month suspension, and fined $10,000 by the Nevada State Athletic Commission (NSAC). He later commented that the steroid usage was for shedding excess weight. Sylvia apologized and made no effort to claim innocence.

==== Injury ====
At UFC 48 in June 2004, Sylvia returned to face Frank Mir for the vacant UFC Heavyweight Championship; he lost. Early on in the fight Mir trapped Sylvia's right arm in an armbar submission attempt. As Sylvia tried to escape the hold, Sylvia's right radius bone snapped about three inches below his elbow. Referee Herb Dean immediately stopped the fight and declared Sylvia unable to continue. Sylvia took exception to the decision and repeatedly claimed his arm was not broken (though the break could be explicitly seen on the slow-motion replay of the fight), even touching it and moving it around to demonstrate. Sylvia was taken to a local hospital where an x-ray revealed that his arm was in fact broken; he then took several months off to recuperate. Afterward, Sylvia said he was glad the referee stopped the fight, thereby saving his arm from further damage.

==== Return ====
Six months after his loss to Frank Mir, Sylvia returned (a titanium plate had been attached to his forearm) to the UFC in February 2005, taking on Andrei Arlovski to crown an interim UFC heavyweight champion as Mir, while still the nominal UFC champion, had suffered numerous injuries from a motorcycle accident that left him unable to defend his title. Sylvia was knocked to the ground by an overhand right punch, and while on the ground was caught in an Achilles lock and submitted.

In May 2005, Sylvia defeated Mike Block in the IFC by TKO, then went on to face MMA veteran Tra Telligman at UFC 54. With one second left in the first round, Sylvia landed a left head kick which knocked out Telligman. Sylvia made his cable television debut next, fighting Assuério Silva at Ultimate Fight Night 3 on Spike TV, winning a unanimous decision after three rounds in a match that was intended to decide the next number one contender.

==== Reclaiming the title ====
At UFC 59, Sylvia was finally awarded his rematch with the then-outright champion Andrei Arlovski. After being knocked down by Arlovski, Sylvia won the fight via knockout in round one.

Sylvia next defended his championship in a trilogy fight with Andrei Arlovski at UFC 61. Sylvia utilized his reach and size advantage to win the fight by unanimous decision.

Sylvia next fought Mundials world Jiu-Jitsu champion, 2-time ADCC world champion and Jiu-Jitsu Pan American champion Jeff Monson at UFC 65. Billed as a classic "striker vs. grappler" match, Sylvia won again via unanimous decision by keeping the fight on the outside with the jab.

On March 3, 2007, Sylvia fought former UFC Heavyweight and UFC Light Heavyweight champion Randy Couture at UFC 68. After being knocked down by Couture he lost the fight and title by decision.

On October 20, 2007, at UFC 77, Sylvia defeated Brandon Vera via unanimous decision (29–28, 29–27, 29–28). In the post-fight interview he called out Cheick Kongo to fight for the spot as number one contender for the heavyweight championship belt.

On February 2, 2008, Sylvia lost via guillotine choke to Antônio Rodrigo Nogueira at UFC 81 in Las Vegas for the interim heavyweight championship. This fight earned him a $65,000 Fight of the Night award.

Early in 2008, Sylvia requested and was granted a release from his UFC contract, which still had one fight remaining on it. Sylvia cited unhappiness with pay, desire to face Fedor Emelianenko, the non-exclusive contracts of other organizations, and the opportunity to fight more often as his reasons for leaving.

=== Post-UFC ===
On March 28, 2008, Sylvia signed with Adrenaline MMA, formerly M-1 Global, to a two-year contract that allowed him to fight for other organizations while under contract with Adrenaline. A few weeks later he was offered to fight Fedor Emelianenko at Affliction Clothing's inaugural event Affliction: Banned. The fight took place on July 19, 2008, and saw the Russian dropping Sylvia and taking his back before securing a rear naked choke, forcing Sylvia to submit at 0:36 of the first round.

On February 25, 2009, Sylvia's manager (and Adrenaline MMA CEO) Monte Cox announced that Sylvia would face former boxing world heavyweight champion and 1988 Olympic gold medalist Ray Mercer in a boxing main event at Adrenaline MMA III on May 30, 2009, at the Trump Taj Mahal Casino Resort in Atlantic City. However, after the New Jersey State Athletic Control Board refused to sanction the fight, the event was moved to Birmingham Jefferson Civic Center in Birmingham, Alabama, and rescheduled to June 13. Only days before the bout, it was changed to be contested under MMA rules, again because of sanctioning problems. When they finally met Sylvia initiated with a low kick, but Mercer knocked Sylvia out with a single punch nine seconds into the first round. Sylvia weighed in at 310.6 pounds for the Super Heavyweight fight.

Before his bout with Mercer, Sylvia was scheduled to face Paul Buentello at Affliction: Trilogy. But after the devastating KO loss, Cox and Affliction decided it would be best for Sylvia to sit out the next few months, because of his recent losses.

After Affliction folded, Sylvia defeated Jason Riley via TKO (punches) 2:32 into the first round at the Adrenaline IV main event on September 18, 2009, in Council Bluffs, Iowa. It was later revealed through Sherdog.com that Sylvia broke his right hand about a minute and a half into his fight with Riley, spoiling a debut with the Japanese promotion Dream, planned for October 25.

Sylvia's next fight was expected to be a rematch with The Ultimate Fighter alumni Wes Sims on March, 20th in Ohio. However, the Ohio State Athletic Commission refused to sanction the bout, saying that the fight was "non-competitive", resulting in the bout being rescheduled to June 6, 2010, in Nova Scotia, Canada, for the IFC Superheavyweight title.

In the meantime, Sylvia fought five time World's Strongest Man Mariusz Pudzianowski at Moosin: God of Martial Arts on May 21, 2010, winning by submission (punches).

The Sims fight was scuttled again (as well as another against UFC veteran Pedro Rizzo), when it was discovered that Sylvia broke his foot at Moosin.

Sylvia defeated Paul Buentello by Knockout due to an uppercut at Powerhouse World Promotions: War on the Mainland on August 14. As heavyweight fighter Pedro Rizzo entered the ring during the post fight interview, Powerhouse World Promotions announced Sylvia would make his first title defense against the fellow UFC veteran. The fight never occurred, however, as PWP disappeared after this inaugural event.

Sylvia fought Vince Lucero at CFX/Extreme Challenge on December 11. Sylvia won the fight by submission due to punches.

=== Titan Fighting Championship ===
Sylvia fought Abe Wagner at Titan Fighting Championships 16 (Sylvia replaced Todd Duffee), Sylvia weighed in at 311 pounds and was defeated 32 seconds into the first round, ending his four-fight win streak.

=== Fight Tour ===
Sylvia was originally scheduled to face Shayne Adams (1–2) on August 13 at a Fight Tour event at the Rockford Metro Centre in Rockford, Illinois. But due to a scheduling conflict with the athletic commission the event will now take place on August 20. Sylvia was then scheduled to face Brian Heden at the August 20 Fight Tour event because the Illinois Athletic Commission would not approve the fight between Adams and Sylvia. However the bout between Sylvia and Heden was later scrapped for unknown reasons and Sylvia would now face submission specialist Patrick Barrentine. Sylvia defeated Barrentine via TKO in the first round. Sylvia weighed in at 280.5 pounds for the bout, 30 pounds lighter than his previous bout against Wagner.

=== ProElite ===
Sylvia was expected to take on Pedro Rizzo at ProElite 2 on November 5, However Rizzo later pulled out of the bout due to injury. Sylvia instead competed against German heavyweight Andreas Kraniotakes and won the fight via unanimous decision.

=== New England Fights ===
Sylvia fought against Randy Smith at NEF: Fight Night 3 on June 16 in his home state of Maine. Sylvia defeated Smith in 12 seconds via TKO.

=== ONE Fighting Championship ===
In mid-July 2012, it was announced that Tim Sylvia had signed with the Asia-based promotion ONE Championship. The promotion quickly announced that Sylvia would face Andrei Arlovski in his debut, marking the fourth time the two fighters had faced each other. Sylvia and Arlovski faced off at ONE Fighting Championship: Pride of a Nation on August 31, 2012, in Manila. The fight between Tim Sylvia and Andrei Arlovski ended in a no-contest due to an illegal soccer kick by Andrei Arlovski. According to ONE FC rules at the time, soccer kicks are legal only if the referee clears the fighter to do so after determining the grounded fighter can still intelligently defend himself. Arlovski received no such clearance, the kick was deemed illegal. Four days later, One FC eliminated the clearance restriction.

On May 31, 2013, Sylvia fought Tony Johnson at ONE FC 9: Rise to Power. Sylvia lost by TKO (doctor stoppage) in 3:25 of the third round.

=== Inoki Genome Federation ===
Sylvia fought Satoshi Ishii at Inoki Bom-Ba-Ye and lost by unanimous decision.

=== Fight Nights ===
Sylvia fought Dagestan prospect Ruslan Magomedov at Fight Nights: Battle of Moscow 13 and lost by unanimous decision.

=== Retirement ===
Sylvia was scheduled to face Juliano Coutinho at Reality Fighting on January 3, 2015, however, he was denied medical clearance by the Mohegan Athletic Unit, and as a result the fight was cancelled. Sylvia weighed in at 371 pounds for the fight. When asked why the fight was cancelled Monte Cox, Sylvia's manager, wrote on Facebook “Not 100 [percent] sure... because of his age he had to do a lot of meds at last minute,” Cox wrote. “In all he needed a stress test, MRI, EKG, eye, blood and physical." Apparently all the tests ordered by the Mohegan commission have made a significant impact on Sylvia's bank account, as he wrote on Cox's Facebook thread that he is “[$2,000] in the hole because of all the [tests] I had to do. After the cancelled fight Sylvia announced his retirement from MMA. He appeared in the cage alongside his proposed opponent and said an MRI issue prevented him from competing. “This is the end of my career,” Sylvia said at Mohegan Sun Arena, adding, “They said that I’ve received enough damage over 16 years.”

== Professional wrestling career ==
On September 25, 2010, Sylvia made his pro wrestling debut, losing via submission to fellow mixed-martial-artist Josh Barnett, at IGF's Genome 13 event.

A grassroots Twitter campaign started on August 1, 2013, for Total Nonstop Action Wrestling president Dixie Carter to sign Sylvia and add him to the TNA ranks. Sylvia himself endorsed the campaign by re-tweeting it to his Twitter followers.

== Slapfighting career ==
At the age of 47, Sylvia made his return to combat sports, competing at SlapFIGHT Championship 25 on April 22, 2023. Sylvia knocked out his opponent in the fifth round.

== Personal life ==
Sylvia has a son. In 2010, Sylvia confirmed that he is a police officer in the State of Illinois on a part-time basis (one day a month).

== Championships and accomplishments ==
=== Mixed martial arts ===
- Ultimate Fighting Championship
  - UFC Heavyweight Championship (Two times)
    - One successful title defense - First reign
    - Two successful title defenses - Second reign
    - Three successful title defenses - Overall
    - Tied (Randy Couture & Stipe Miocic) for most title bouts in UFC heavyweight history (9)
  - Fight of the Night (One time) vs. Antônio Rodrigo Nogueira
  - UFC Encyclopedia Awards
    - Knockout of the Night (Two times) vs. Ricco Rodriguez and Andrei Arlovski 1
  - UFC.com Awards
    - 2005: Ranked #2 Knockout of the Year vs. Tra Telligman
    - 2006: Ranked #3 Knockout of the Year vs. Andrei Arlovski 1 & Ranked #4 Fight of the Year vs. Andrei Arlovski 1
    - 2007: Ranked #9 Fight of the Year vs. Randy Couture
- Powerhouse World Promotions
  - PWP Heavyweight Championship (One time)
- International Sport Karate Association
  - ISKA MMA Super heavyweight Championship (One time)
- ICON Sport
  - Superbrawl Return of the Heavyweights Tournament Winner
- Extreme Challenge
  - Extreme Challenge 47 Heavyweight Tournament Winner
- MMA Fighting
  - 2008 #3 Ranked UFC Fight of the Year vs. Antônio Rodrigo Nogueira at UFC 81

== Mixed martial arts record ==
Professional record breakdown
42 matches	31 wins	10 losses
By knockout	22	3
By submission	2	4
By decision	7	3
No contests	1	

Res.	Record	Opponent	Method	Event	Date	Round	Time	Location	Notes
Loss	31–10 (1)	Ruslan Magomedov	Decision (unanimous)	Fight Nights: Battle of Moscow 13	October 27, 2013	3	5:00	Moscow, Russia	Super Heavyweight bout.
Loss	31–9 (1)	Tony Johnson	TKO (doctor stoppage)	ONE FC: Rise to Power	May 31, 2013	3	3:25	Pasay, Philippines	Catchweight (271 lb) bout; Sylvia missed weight.
Loss	31–8 (1)	Satoshi Ishii	Decision (unanimous)	Inoki Genome Federation: Inoki Bom-Ba-Ye 2012	December 31, 2012	3	5:00	Tokyo, Japan	Openweight bout.
NC	31–7 (1)	Andrei Arlovski	NC (kick to grounded opponent)	ONE FC: Pride of a Nation	August 31, 2012	2	4:46	Quezon City, Philippines	Accidental illegal soccer kick rendered Sylvia unable to continue.
Win	31–7	Randy Smith	TKO (punches)	New England Fights: Fight Night 3	June 16, 2012	1	0:12	Lewiston, Maine, United States	
Win	30–7	Andreas Kraniotakes	Decision (unanimous)	ProElite 2	November 5, 2011	3	5:00	Moline, Illinois, United States	
Win	29–7	Patrick Barrentine	TKO (punches and elbows)	Fight Tour: Sylvia vs. Barrentine	August 20, 2011	1	2:09	Rockford, Illinois, United States	
Loss	28–7	Abe Wagner	TKO (punches)	Titan FC 16	January 28, 2011	1	0:32	Kansas City, Kansas, United States	
Win	28–6	Vince Lucero	TKO (submission to punches)	Cage Fighting Xtreme: Extreme Challenge on Target	December 11, 2010	1	2:44	Minneapolis, Minnesota, United States	
Win	27–6	Paul Buentello	KO (punch)	Powerhouse World Promotions: War on the Mainland	August 14, 2010	2	4:57	Irvine, California, United States	Won the inaugural PWP Heavyweight Championship.
Win	26–6	Mariusz Pudzianowski	TKO (submission to punches)	Moosin: God of Martial Arts	May 21, 2010	2	1:43	Worcester, Massachusetts, United States	Super Heavyweight bout.
Win	25–6	Jason Riley	TKO (punches)	Adrenaline MMA 4	September 18, 2009	1	2:32	Council Bluffs, Iowa, United States	
Loss	24–6	Ray Mercer	KO (punch)	Adrenaline MMA 3	June 13, 2009	1	0:09	Birmingham, Alabama, United States	
Loss	24–5	Fedor Emelianenko	Submission (rear-naked choke)	Affliction: Banned	July 19, 2008	1	0:36	Anaheim, California, United States	For the Affliction Heavyweight Championship.
Loss	24–4	Antônio Rodrigo Nogueira	Submission (guillotine choke)	UFC 81	February 2, 2008	3	1:28	Las Vegas, Nevada, United States	For the interim UFC Heavyweight Championship. Fight of the Night.
Win	24–3	Brandon Vera	Decision (unanimous)	UFC 77	October 21, 2007	3	5:00	Cincinnati, Ohio, United States	
Loss	23–3	Randy Couture	Decision (unanimous)	UFC 68	March 3, 2007	5	5:00	Columbus, Ohio, United States	Lost the UFC Heavyweight Championship.
Win	23–2	Jeff Monson	Decision (unanimous)	UFC 65	November 18, 2006	5	5:00	Sacramento, California, United States	Defended the UFC Heavyweight Championship.
Win	22–2	Andrei Arlovski	Decision (unanimous)	UFC 61	July 8, 2006	5	5:00	Las Vegas, Nevada, United States	Defended the UFC Heavyweight Championship.
Win	21–2	Andrei Arlovski	TKO (punches)	UFC 59	April 15, 2006	1	2:43	Anaheim, California, United States	Won the UFC Heavyweight Championship.
Win	20–2	Assuério Silva	Decision (unanimous)	UFC Ultimate Fight Night 3	January 16, 2006	3	5:00	Las Vegas, Nevada, United States	
Win	19–2	Tra Telligman	KO (head kick)	UFC 54	August 20, 2005	1	4:59	Las Vegas, Nevada, United States	
Win	18–2	Mike Block	TKO (punches)	International FC: Caged Combat	May 21, 2005	1	1:26	Columbus, Ohio, United States	Won vacant ISKA MMA Super heavyweight Championship.
Loss	17–2	Andrei Arlovski	Submission (achilles lock)	UFC 51	February 5, 2005	1	0:47	Las Vegas, Nevada, United States	For the interim UFC Heavyweight Championship.
Win	17–1	Wes Sims	TKO (punches)	Superbrawl 38	December 12, 2004	1	1:32	Honolulu, Hawaii, United States	
Loss	16–1	Frank Mir	Technical Submission (armbar)	UFC 48	June 19, 2004	1	0:50	Las Vegas, Nevada, United States	For the vacant UFC Heavyweight Championship.
Win	16–0	Gan McGee	TKO (punches)	UFC 44	September 26, 2003	1	1:54	Las Vegas, Nevada, United States	Defended the UFC Heavyweight Championship. Sylvia was stripped of the title on Oct 15, 2003 due a failed post-fight drug test.
Win	15–0	Ricco Rodriguez	TKO (punches)	UFC 41	February 28, 2003	1	3:09	Atlantic City, New Jersey, United States	Won the UFC Heavyweight Championship.
Win	14–0	Wesley Correira	TKO (corner stoppage)	UFC 39	September 27, 2002	2	1:43	Uncasville, Connecticut, United States	
Win	13–0	Jeff Gerlick	TKO (punches)	Extreme Challenge 48	July 27, 2002	1	3:17	Tama, Iowa, United States	
Win	12–0	Mike Whitehead	TKO (knee and punches)	Superbrawl 24: Day 2	April 27, 2002	1	2:38	Honolulu, Hawaii, United States	Won the Superbrawl 24 Heavyweight Tournament.
Win	11–0	Jason Lambert	TKO (doctor stoppage)	Superbrawl 24: Day 2	April 27, 2002	2	4:13	Honolulu, Hawaii, United States	Superbrawl 24 Heavyweight Tournament Semifinal.
Win	10–0	Boyd Ballard	KO (knee)	Superbrawl 24: Day 2	April 27, 2002	1	3:21	Honolulu, Hawaii, United States	Superbrawl 24 Heavyweight Tournament Quarterfinal.
Win	9–0	Mike Whitehead	TKO (punches)	Superbrawl 24: Day 1	April 26, 2002	1	3:46	Honolulu, Hawaii, United States	Superbrawl 24 Heavyweight Tournament Round of 16.
Win	8–0	Matt Frembling	Decision (unanimous)	Extreme Challenge 47	March 16, 2002	2	5:00	Orem, Utah, United States	Won the 2002 Extreme Challenge Heavyweight Tournament.
Win	7–0	Gino de la Cruz	TKO (punches)	Extreme Challenge 47	March 16, 2002	1	0:43	Orem, Utah, United States	2002 Extreme Challenge Heavyweight Tournament Semifinal.
Win	6–0	Ernest Henderson	TKO (fell out of the ring)	Extreme Challenge 47	March 16, 2002	1	0:29	Orem, Utah, United States	2002 Extreme Challenge Heavyweight Tournament Quarterfinal.
Win	5–0	Greg Wikan	Submission (choke)	Extreme Challenge Trials: November 2001	November 17, 2001	3	2:20	Davenport, Iowa, United States	
Win	4–0	Ben Rothwell	Decision (unanimous)	Extreme Challenge 42	August 24, 2001	3	5:00	Davenport, Iowa, United States	
Win	3–0	Greg Wikan	TKO (corner stoppage)	Ultimate Wrestling: Ultimate Fight Minnesota	June 2, 2001	1	5:00	Bloomington, Minnesota, United States	
Win	2–0	Gabe Beauperthy	Submission (choke)	Gladiator Challenge 3	April 7, 2001	2	4:16	Friant, California, United States	
Win	1–0	Randy Durant	TKO (punches)	International FC: Battleground 2001	January 19, 2001	1	2:05	Atlantic City, New Jersey, United States	Heavyweight debut.

== Pay-per-view bouts ==
No.	Fight	Event	Date	City	Venue	PPV Buys
1.	Rodriguez vs. Sylvia	UFC 41	February 28, 2003	Atlantic City, New Jersey, United States	Boardwalk Hall	60,000
2.	Arlovski vs. Sylvia 2	UFC 59	April 15, 2006	Anaheim, California, United States	Arrowhead Pond	425,000
3.	Sylvia vs. Arlovski 3	UFC 61	July 8, 2006	Las Vegas, Nevada, United States	Mandalay Bay Events Center	775,000
4.	Sylvia vs. Couture	UFC 68	March 3, 2007	Columbus, Ohio, United States	Nationwide Arena	540,000
5.	Sylvia vs. Nogueira	UFC 81	February 2, 2008	Las Vegas, Nevada, United States	Mandalay Bay Events Center	650,000
6.	Emelianenko vs. Sylvia	Affliction: Banned	July 19, 2008	Anaheim, California, United States	Honda Center	100,000

== See also ==
- List of male mixed martial artists
- List of sportspeople sanctioned for doping offences

Preceded by Andrei Arlovski	12th UFC Heavyweight Championship; April 15, 2006 – March 3, 2007	Succeeded by Randy Couture
Preceded by Ricco Rodriguez	9th UFC Heavyweight Championship; February 28, 2003 – October 15, 2003	Vacant Sylvia relinquished his title Title next held by Frank Mir
