= 2005 in UFC =

Mixed martial arts events

Information
- First date: Feb 5, 2005
- Last date: Nov 19, 2005

Events
- Total events: 10
- UFC: 6
- UFC Fight Night: 2
- TUF Finale events: 2

Fights
- Total fights: 80
- Title fights: 9

Chronology
2004 in UFC	2005 in UFC	2006 in UFC

The year 2005 was the 13th year in the history of the Ultimate Fighting Championship (UFC), a mixed martial arts promotion based in the United States. In 2005 the UFC held 10 events beginning with, UFC 51: Super Saturday. The reality TV series The Ultimate Fighter and the first UFC Ultimate Fight Night both premiered on Spike TV. The Ultimate Fighter 1 Finale was the first live UFC broadcast on non-pay-per-view television.

== 2005 UFC.com awards ==
This was the first year that the late UFC senior editor Thomas Gerbasi published the year-end awards on UFC.com.

2005 UFC.COM Awards
No	The Submissions	The Knockouts	The Fights
1	Matt Hughes defeats Frank Trigg 2 UFC 52	Chuck Liddell defeats Randy Couture 2 UFC 52	Forrest Griffin defeats Stephan Bonnar; The Ultimate Fighter 1 Finale
2	Georges St-Pierre defeats Frank Trigg; UFC 54	Tim Sylvia defeats Tra Telligman; UFC 54	Matt Hughes defeats Frank Trigg 2 UFC 52
3	Pete Sell defeats Phil Baroni; UFC 51	Andrei Arlovski defeats Paul Buentello; UFC 55	Tito Ortiz defeats Vitor Belfort; UFC 51
4	Andrei Arlovski defeats Tim Sylvia; UFC 51	James Irvin defeats Terry Martin; UFC 54	Rashad Evans defeats Brad Imes; The Ultimate Fighter 2 Finale
5	Kenny Florian defeats Kit Cope; The Ultimate Fighter 2	Chuck Liddell defeats Randy Couture 3 UFC 57	Diego Sanchez defeats Nick Diaz; The Ultimate Fighter 2 Finale
6	Drew Fickett defeats Josh Koscheck; UFC Ultimate Fight Night 2	Luke Cummo defeats Sammy Morgan; The Ultimate Fighter 2: Episode 10	Luke Cummo defeats Sammy Morgan; The Ultimate Fighter 2: Episode 10
7	Ivan Salaverry defeats Joe Riggs; UFC 52	Josh Burkman defeats Sammy Morgan; The Ultimate Fighter 2 Finale	Rich Franklin defeats Evan Tanner; UFC 53
8	Matt Lindland defeats Travis Lutter; UFC 52	Mike Kyle defeats James Irvin; UFC 51	David Loiseau defeats Charles McCarthy; UFC 53
9	Joe Doerksen defeats Patrick Côté; UFC 52	Mike Swick defeats Gideon Ray; UFC Ultimate Fight Night	Joe Stevenson defeats Luke Cummo; The Ultimate Fighter 2 Finale
10	Paul Buentello defeats Kevin Jordan; UFC 53	David Loiseau defeats Charles McCarthy; UFC 53	Georges St-Pierre defeats Frank Trigg; UFC 54
Ref			

== Title fights ==
Title fights in 2005
Weight class				Method	Round	Time	Event	Notes
Heavyweight	Andrei Arlovski	def.	Tim Sylvia	Submission (achilles lock)	1	0:47	UFC 51: Super Saturday	(Note: For the UFC Heavyweight Championship. Arlovski becomes the Interim Heavyweight champion. The title is an interim championship due to the UFC Heavyweight Champion, Frank Mir, being seriously injured in a motorcycle accident and not able to defend the title against No. 1 contender, Andrei Arlovski.)
Middleweight	Evan Tanner	def.	David Terrell	TKO (punches)	1	4:35	UFC 51: Super Saturday	(Note: For the UFC Middleweight Championship. Tanner becomes the UFC Middleweight champion filling the vacant title, and the first Middleweight champion since 2002.)
Light Heavyweight	Chuck Liddell	def.	Randy Couture (c)	KO (Punches)	1	2:06	UFC 52: Couture vs Liddell	(Note: For the UFC Light Heavyweight Championship.)
Welterweight	Matt Hughes (c)	def.	Frank Trigg	Submission (rear-naked choke)	1	4:05	UFC 52: Couture vs Liddell	(Note: For the UFC Welterweight Championship.)
Middleweight	Rich Franklin	def.	Evan Tanner (c)	TKO (doctor stoppage)	4	3:25	UFC 53: Heavy Hitters	(Note: For the UFC Middleweight Championship.)
Heavyweight	Andrei Arlovski (ic)	def.	Justin Eilers	TKO (punches)	1	4:10	UFC 53: Heavy Hitters	(Note: For the UFC Heavyweight Championship. It was realized that Eilers had injured his knee in the bout, prompting the referee to stop the fight as Eilers could not defend himself.)
Light Heavyweight	Chuck Liddell (c)	def.	Jeremy Horn	TKO (punches)	4	2:46	UFC 54: Boiling Point	(Note: For the UFC Light Heavyweight Championship. At that time, Horn informed the referee that he could no longer see properly, and the official called the bout.)
Heavyweight	Andrei Arlovski (c)	def.	Paul Buentello	KO (punch)	1	0:15	UFC 55: Fury	(Note: For the UFC Heavyweight Championship. The UFC decided this match would be for the undisputed UFC Heavyweight title, as former UFC Heavyweight champion Frank Mir, who had been badly injured in a motorcycle accident, was still unable to compete.)
Middleweight	Rich Franklin (c)	def.	Nate Quarry	KO (punch)	1	2:34	UFC 56: Full Force	(Note: For the UFC Middleweight Championship.)

== The Ultimate Fighter ==
Season	Finale	Division	Winner	Runner-up
TUF 1: Team Couture vs. Team Liddell	Apr 9, 2005	Light Heavyweight	Forrest Griffin	Stephan Bonnar
TUF 1: Team Couture vs. Team Liddell	Apr 9, 2005	Middleweight	Diego Sanchez	Kenny Florian
TUF 2: Team Hughes vs. Team Franklin	Nov 5, 2005	Heavyweight	Rashad Evans	Brad Imes
TUF 2: Team Hughes vs. Team Franklin	Nov 5, 2005	Welterweight	Joe Stevenson	Luke Cummo

== Debut UFC fighters ==
The following fighters fought their first UFC fight in 2005:

ISO	Fighter	Division
(Italy)	Alessio Sakara	Light Heavyweight
(United States)	Alex Karalexis	Welterweight
(Argentina)	Alex Schoenauer	Light Heavyweight
(Russia)	Ansar Chalangov	Welterweight
(Canada)	Bill Mahood	Light Heavyweight
(United States)	Bobby Southworth	Light Heavyweight
(United States)	Brad Imes	Heavyweight
(United States)	Branden Lee Hinkle	Heavyweight
(United States)	Brandon Vera	Heavyweight
(United States)	Brian Gassaway	Welterweight
(United States)	Brock Larson	Welterweight
(United States)	Chael Sonnen	Light Heavyweight
(United States)	Charles McCarthy	Middleweight
(United States)	Chris Leben	Middleweight
(United States)	Chris Sanford	Middleweight
(United States)	Diego Sanchez	Middleweight
(United States)	Drew Fickett	Welterweight
(Brazil)	Fabiano Scherner	Heavyweight
(United States)	Forrest Griffin	Light Heavyweight
(Brazil)	Gabriel Gonzaga	Heavyweight
(United States)	Gideon Ray	Middleweight
(United States)	James Irvin	Light Heavyweight
(United States)	Jason Miller	Welterweight

ISO	Fighter	Division
(United States)	Jason Thacker	Welterweight
(United States)	Jeff Newton	Light Heavyweight
(United States)	Joe Stevenson	Welterweight
(United States)	John Marsh	Heavyweight
(United States)	Jon Fitch	Welterweight
(Canada)	Jonathan Goulet	Welterweight
(United States)	Josh Burkman	Welterweight
(United States)	Josh Koscheck	Welterweight
(United States)	Josh Neer	Welterweight
(United States)	Josh Rafferty	Middleweight
(Japan)	Keigo Kunihara	Lightweight
(United States)	Keith Jardine	Light Heavyweight
(United States)	Keith Wisniewski	Welterweight
(United States)	Kenny Florian	Middleweight
(United States)	Kerry Schall	Heavyweight
(United States)	Kevin Jordan	Heavyweight
(United States)	Kit Cope	Lightweight
(United States)	Lodune Sincaid	Light Heavyweight
(United States)	Luke Cummo	Welterweight
(Brazil)	Marcio Cruz	Heavyweight
(United States)	Marcus Davis	Welterweight
(United States)	Melvin Guillard	Lightweight

ISO	Fighter	Division
(United States)	Mike Swick	Middleweight
(United States)	Nate Marquardt	Middleweight
(United States)	Nate Quarry	Middleweight
(United States)	Nick Thompson	Welterweight
(United States)	Paul Buentello	Heavyweight
(United States)	Pete Sell	Middleweight
(United States)	Rashad Evans	Heavyweight
(United States)	Ron Faircloth	Middleweight
(United States)	Sam Hoger	Light Heavyweight
(United States)	Sam Morgan	Welterweight
(United States)	Sean Gannon	Heavyweight
(United States)	Spencer Fisher	Lightweight
(United States)	Stephan Bonnar	Light Heavyweight
(United States)	Terry Martin	Middleweight
(Brazil)	Thiago Alves	Welterweight
(United States)	Tom Murphy	Light Heavyweight
(United States)	Tyson Griffin	Lightweight
(Canada)	Victor Valimaki	Light Heavyweight
(United States)	Wes Combs	Light Heavyweight
(Brazil)	Wilson Gouveia	Light Heavyweight
(Japan)	Yuki Sasaki	Middleweight
(Japan)	Yushin Okami	Middleweight

== Events list ==
#	Event	Date	Venue	Location	Attendance
065	UFC 56: Full Force	Nov 19, 2005	MGM Grand Garden Arena	Las Vegas, Nevada, U.S.	12,000
064	The Ultimate Fighter: Team Hughes vs. Team Franklin Finale	Nov 5, 2005	Hard Rock Hotel and Casino	Las Vegas, Nevada, U.S.	—N/a
063	UFC 55: Fury	Oct 7, 2005	Mohegan Sun Arena	Uncasville, Connecticut, U.S.	8,000
062	UFC Fight Night 2	Oct 3, 2005	Hard Rock Hotel and Casino	Las Vegas, Nevada, U.S.	—N/a
061	UFC 54: Boiling Point	Aug 20, 2005	MGM Grand Garden Arena	Las Vegas, Nevada, U.S.	13,520
060	UFC Ultimate Fight Night	Aug 6, 2005	Cox Pavilion	Las Vegas, Nevada, U.S.	—N/a
059	UFC 53: Heavy Hitters	Jun 4, 2005	Boardwalk Hall	Atlantic City, New Jersey, U.S.	12,000
058	UFC 52: Couture vs Liddell	Apr 16, 2005	MGM Grand Garden Arena	Las Vegas, Nevada, U.S.	14,562
057	The Ultimate Fighter: Team Couture vs. Team Liddell Finale	Apr 9, 2005	Cox Pavilion	Las Vegas, Nevada, U.S.	—N/a
056	UFC 51: Super Saturday	Feb 5, 2005	Mandalay Bay Events Center	Las Vegas, Nevada, U.S.	11,072

== UFC Ultimate Fight Night ==
UFC Ultimate Fight Night
- Promotion: Ultimate Fighting Championship
- Date: August 6, 2005
- Venue: Cox Pavilion
- City: Las Vegas, Nevada

Event chronology
UFC 53: Heavy Hitters	UFC Ultimate Fight Night	UFC 54: Boiling Point

UFC Ultimate Fight Night (also known as UFC Fight Night 1) was an event held on August 6, 2005, at the Cox Pavilion in Las Vegas, Nevada. The event, aired on Spike, was the first UFC Fight Night event.

=== Results ===
Main card
Weight class				Method	Round	Time	Notes
Middleweight	Nate Marquardt	def	Ivan Salaverry	Decision (unanimous) (30–27, 30–27, 29–28)	3	5:00
Middleweight	Chris Leben	def	Patrick Côté	Decision (split) (29–28, 30–27, 27–29)	3	5:00
Light Heavyweight	Stephan Bonnar	def	Sam Hoger	Decision (unanimous) (30–27, 30–27, 30–27)	3	5:00
Middleweight	Nate Quarry	def	Pete Sell	TKO (punches)	1	0:42
Preliminary card
Welterweight	Josh Koscheck	def	Pete Spratt	Submission (rear-naked choke)	1	1:53
Middleweight	Mike Swick	def	Gideon Ray	TKO (punches)	1	0:22
Welterweight	Kenny Florian	def	Alex Karalexis	TKO (cut)	2	3:52
Welterweight	Drew Fickett	def	Josh Neer	Submission (rear-naked choke)	1	1:35

=== Encyclopedia awards ===
The following fighters were honored in the October 2011 book titled UFC Encyclopedia.

- Fight of the Night: Chris Leben vs. Patrick Côté
- Knockout of the Night: Mike Swick
- Submission of the Night: Josh Koscheck

== See also ==
- List of UFC champions
- List of UFC events
