= UFC Ultimate Fight Night 2 =

UFC mixed martial arts event in 2005

Ultimate Fight Night 2
- The poster for Ultimate Fight Night 2
- Promotion: Ultimate Fighting Championship
- Date: October 3, 2005
- Venue: Hard Rock Hotel and Casino
- City: Las Vegas, Nevada

Event chronology
UFC 54: Boiling Point	Ultimate Fight Night 2	UFC 55: Fury

Ultimate Fight Night 2 was a mixed martial arts event held by the Ultimate Fighting Championship on October 3, 2005. The event took place at the Hard Rock Hotel and Casino in Las Vegas, Nevada, and was broadcast live on Spike TV in the United States and Canada. The broadcast drew a 1.6 overall rating while going head-to-head with USA Network's WWE Raw in a heated ratings battle.

This event also marked the first UFC appearance of Thiago Alves, Jon Fitch, Brandon Vera, Spencer Fisher and Brock Larson.

== Results ==
Main Card
Weight class				Method	Round	Time	Notes
Middleweight	David Loiseau	def.	Evan Tanner	TKO (doctor stoppage)	2	4:15	(Note: Loiseau earned a title shot against champion Rich Franklin at UFC 58 with the victory.)
Middleweight	Chris Leben	def.	Edwin Dewees	Submission (armbar)	1	3:26
Heavyweight	Brandon Vera	def.	Fabiano Scherner	TKO (knees)	2	3:22
Welterweight	Drew Fickett	def.	Josh Koscheck	Technical Submission (rear-naked choke)	3	4:28
Preliminary card
Welterweight	Spencer Fisher	def.	Thiago Alves	Submission (triangle choke)	2	4:43
Middleweight	Jon Fitch	def.	Brock Larson	Decision (unanimous) (30–27, 30–27, 30–27)	3	5:00
Welterweight	Jonathan Goulet	def.	Jay Hieron	TKO (doctor stoppage)	3	1:05

== Encyclopedia awards ==
The following fighters were honored in the October 2011 book titled UFC Encyclopedia.

- Fight of the Night: David Loiseau vs. Evan Tanner
- Knockout of the Night: Brandon Vera
- Submission of the Night: Drew Fickett

== See also ==
- Ultimate Fighting Championship
- List of UFC champions
- List of UFC events
- 2005 in UFC
