= UFC 55 =

UFC mixed martial arts event in 2005

UFC 55: Fury
- The poster for UFC 55: Fury
- Promotion: Ultimate Fighting Championship
- Date: October 7, 2005
- Venue: Mohegan Sun Arena
- City: Uncasville, Connecticut
- Attendance: 8,000
- Buyrate: 125,000

Event chronology
Ultimate Fight Night 2	UFC 55: Fury	The Ultimate Fighter: Team Hughes vs. Team Franklin Finale

UFC 55: Fury was a mixed martial arts event held by the Ultimate Fighting Championship on October 7, 2005 at the Mohegan Sun Arena in Uncasville, Connecticut. The event was broadcast live on pay-per-view in the United States, and later released on DVD. This would be the last UFC to air live on a Friday until UFC 141, which aired on December 30, 2011.

== Commentary team ==
- Craig Hummer, play by play commentator
- Joe Rogan, color commentator

== Results ==
Main Card
Weight class				Method	Round	Time	Notes
Heavyweight	Andrei Arlovski (c)	def.	Paul Buentello	KO (punch)	1	0:15	(Note: For the UFC Heavyweight Championship. The UFC decided this match would be for the undisputed title, as former champion Frank Mir, who had been badly injured in a motorcycle accident, was still unable to compete.)
Heavyweight	Branden Lee Hinkle	def.	Sean Gannon	TKO (punches)	1	4:14
Light Heavyweight	Forrest Griffin	def.	Elvis Sinosic	TKO (punches)	1	3:22	(Note: Sinosic was a replacement for Griffin's original opponent, Ian Freeman, who suffered an injury before the fight and had to withdraw from the fight card.)
Light Heavyweight	Renato Sobral	def.	Chael Sonnen	Submission (triangle choke)	2	1:20
Welterweight	Joe Riggs	def.	Chris Lytle	TKO (cut)	2	2:00
Preliminary card
Middleweight	Jorge Rivera	def.	Dennis Hallman	Decision (unanimous) (30–27, 30–27, 30–27)	3	5:00	(Note: The bout, although preliminary, was aired on the broadcast.)
Heavyweight	Marcio Cruz	def.	Keigo Kunihara	Submission (rear-naked choke)	2	1:02
Light Heavyweight	Alessio Sakara	vs.	Ron Faircloth	NC (groin kick)	2	0:10	(Note: This bout ended in No Contest at 0:10 in round two after Sakara was unintentionally kicked in the groin. The bout, although preliminary, was aired on the broadcast.)

== Encyclopedia awards ==
The following fighters were honored in the October 2011 book titled UFC Encyclopedia.

- Fight of the Night: Forrest Griffin vs. Elvis Sinosic
- Knockout of the Night: Andrei Arlovski
- Submission of the Night: Renato Sobral

== See also ==
- Ultimate Fighting Championship
- List of UFC champions
- List of UFC events
- 2005 in UFC

== Sources ==
- UFC 55: Fury Results on Sherdog.com
