= Mike van Arsdale =

American mixed martial arts fighter (born 1965)

Mike Van Arsdale
- Mike van Arsdale in 2007
- Born: June 20, 1965 (age 61); Waterloo, Iowa, U.S.
- Other names: "Superman"
- Height: 6 ft 2 in (1.88 m)
- Weight: 205 lb (93 kg; 14.6 st)
- Division: Heavyweight; Light Heavyweight
- Fighting out of: San Jose, California
- Team: American Kickboxing Academy (until 2005); JacksonWink MMA (2005–2011); Imperial Athletics/BlackZilians (2011–2012)
- Wrestling: NCAA Division I Wrestling
- Years active: 1998, 2002–2006

Mixed martial arts record
- Total: 13
- Wins: 8
- By knockout: 1
- By submission: 6
- By decision: 1
- Losses: 5
- By knockout: 1
- By submission: 4

Other information
- Notable students: Rashad Evans
- Mixed martial arts record from Sherdog

Mike van Arsdale (born June 20, 1965) is an American former professional mixed martial artist. A professional from 1998 until 2006, he competed for the UFC, International Vale Tudo Championship, and the World Fighting Alliance. He was the winner of the IVC 4 Heavyweight Tournament.

== Background ==
Born and raised in Waterloo, Iowa, Van Arsdale has a very decorated background in wrestling. He attended Waterloo West High School, and compiled a record of 20–6 as a sophomore, went 28–2 while also winning a state championship as a junior, and then went 27–3 while being a state-runner up in his senior year. Van Arsdale then won a Junior National title and was a Junior World runner-up title before continuing his career in college at Iowa State University. A first-team freshman All-American, Van Arsdale placed sixth in the NCAA tournament as a sophomore (1985) and placed third in his junior season (1986). As a senior, he was the 1988 NCAA Division I collegiate wrestling champion at 167 lb (76 kg). After college, Van Arsdale won a World Cup Championship in 1991, a CISM (military) World Championship, was a two-time Olympic alternate, and a six-time member of the National Freestyle Wrestling team. Van Arsdale was inducted into the Iowa Wrestling Hall of Fame in 2011.

== Mixed martial arts career ==
=== Early career ===
Van Arsdale's professional mixed martial arts debut came in 1998 when he traveled to Brazil to compete in the no-rules International Vale Tudo Championship, a tournament in which Van Arsdale won three consecutive fights in one evening to claim the title.

His first career loss was in his fifth professional fight, when he was knocked out by Wanderlei Silva.

=== UFC ===
With a record of 7–1, Van Arsdale signed with the UFC and made his debut for the organization on May 15, 1998 against Gracie Jiu-jitsu representative Joe Pardo, defeating him via submission. He would compete for the UFC next on April 16, 2005 against John Marsh at UFC 52. Van Arsdale won via unanimous decision.

His next appearance was at UFC 54 on August 20, 2005 against UFC Hall of Famer Randy Couture. He was defeated via submission in the third round.

Van Arsdale fought again on February 4, 2006 at UFC 57 against Renato "Babalu" Sobral and lost via rear-naked choke submission at 2:21 in the first round.

== Coaching ==
Van Arsdale was the head coach for the Blackzillians when the team was initially formed in 2011. He has since moved on from the team and is currently opening a new gym in Arizona.

Melvin Guillard, former UFC Lightweight and former student of van Arsdale, stirred controversy by saying that he was "glad" that Van Arsdale left the Blackzilians camp.

== Personal life ==
Van Arsdale has five children.

== Championships and accomplishments ==
- George Tragos/Lou Thesz Professional Wrestling Hall of Fame
  - George Tragos Award (2017)
- International Vale Tudo Championship
  - IVC 4 Heavyweight Tournament Winner

== Mixed martial arts record ==
Professional record breakdown
13 matches	8 wins	5 losses
By knockout	1	1
By submission	6	4
By decision	1	0

Res.	Record	Opponent	Method	Event	Date	Round	Time	Location	Notes
Loss	8–5	Matt Lindland	Submission (guillotine choke)	Raze MMA: Fight Night	April 29, 2006	1	3:38	California, United States	
Loss	8–4	Jorge Oliveira	Submission (triangle choke)	PFA: Pride and Fury 4	March 24, 2006	1	4:02	Idaho, United States	
Loss	8–3	Renato Sobral	Submission (rear-naked choke)	UFC 57: Liddell vs. Couture 3	February 4, 2006	1	2:21	Nevada, United States	
Loss	8–2	Randy Couture	Submission (anaconda choke)	UFC 54	August 20, 2005	3	0:52	Nevada, United States	Light Heavyweight debut.
Win	8–1	John Marsh	Decision (unanimous)	UFC 52	April 16, 2005	3	5:00	Nevada, United States	
Win	7–1	Emanuel Newton	Submission (kimura)	MMA Mexico: Day 1	December 17, 2004	1	1:35	Mexico	
Win	6–1	Mario Lopez	Submission (crucifix)	EP: XXXtreme Impact	December 28, 2003	1	0:28	Mexico	
Win	5–1	Chris Haseman	TKO (strikes)	WFA 3: Level 3	November 23, 2002	2	3:10	Nevada, United States	
Loss	4–1	Wanderlei Silva	KO (punch and kick)	IVC 6: The Challenge	August 23, 1998	1	4:00	Brazil	
Win	4–0	Joe Pardo	Submission (armlock)	UFC 17	May 15, 1998	1	11:01	Alabama, United States	
Win	3–0	Dario Amorim	Submission (shoulder injury)	IVC 4: The Battle	February 7, 1998	1	2:42	Brazil	Won the IVC 4 Heavyweight Tournament.
Win	2–0	Marcelo Barbosa	Submission (punches)	IVC 4: The Battle	February 7, 1998	1	3:36	Brazil	IVC 4 Heavyweight Tournament Semifinals.
Win	1–0	Francisco Nonato	Submission (keylock)	IVC 4: The Battle	February 7, 1998	1	5:42	Brazil	IVC 4 Heavyweight Tournament Quarterfinals.

== Submission grappling record ==
Result	Opponent	Method	Event	Date	Round	Time	Notes
Loss	(Brazil) Fabricio Werdum		ADCC-2003	2003			99 kg
Win	(United States) Roy Nelson		ADCC-2003	2003			99 kg
Win	(South Africa) Mark Robinson		ADCC-2003	2003			99 kg
Loss	(Brazil) Marcelo Garcia	Submission (rear naked choke)	ADCC-2003	2003			ABSOLUTE
Loss	(United States) Ricardo Almeida		ADCC-2001	2001			ABSOLUTE
Win	(United States) Sean Alvarez		ADCC-2001	2001			ABSOLUTE
Loss	(United States) Tito Ortiz	Submission (Heel Hook)	ADCC-2000	2000			99 kg
Win	(Brazil) Murilo Bustamante	Decision	ADCC-2000	2000			99 kg
Loss	(United States) Mark Kerr	Decision	ADCC-2000	2000	5	5:00	ABSOLUTE
Win	(Brazil) Antonio Schembri	Decision	ADCC-2000	2000	5	5:00	ABSOLUTE
Win	(Brazil) Renato Verisimo	Decision	The Contenders	1997	5	5:00	
