= Ivan Salaverry =

Canadian mixed martial arts fighter

- Born: January 11, 1971 (age 55); Toronto, Ontario, Canada
- Height: 6 ft 0 in (1.83 m)
- Weight: 185 lb (84 kg; 13.2 st)
- Division: Heavyweight; Light Heavyweight; Middleweight
- Reach: 75 1/2 in (192 cm)
- Style: Wrestling; Kickboxing
- Fighting out of: Seattle, Washington, United States
- Team: Ivan Salaverry MMA
- Rank: Black belt in Brazilian Jiu-Jitsu
- Years active: 1999–2008, 2011–2013

Mixed martial arts record
- Total: 23
- Wins: 14
- By knockout: 5
- By submission: 5
- By decision: 4
- Losses: 9
- By knockout: 4
- By submission: 1
- By decision: 3
- By disqualification: 1

Other information
- Mixed martial arts record from Sherdog

Ivan E. Salaverry (born January 11, 1971) is a Canadian mixed martial arts fighter and instructor. He is a member of Tito Ortiz's Team Punishment, and is known for his well-rounded skills. Salaverry is a middleweight veteran of the Ultimate Fighting Championship, BAMMA and the now-defunct World Fighting Alliance. He is also notable for being a pioneer of the crucifix-style position from side control, which is often referred to as "The Salaverry" during mixed martial arts broadcasts, particularly by UFC commentator Joe Rogan. He also holds notable wins over Andrei Semenov and Joe Riggs.

== Mixed martial arts career ==
Salaverry began his MMA career in August 1999. Over the next four years Salaverry acquired an 8-2 professional record, his most notable fight taking place in Japan for Shooto against Akihiro Gono, which he lost via KO in the first round. In 2002 Salaverry made his UFC debut defeating Russian fighter Andrei Semenov. Salaverry would continue to fight for the UFC, but struggled to find consistency. He lost by decision to Matt Lindland, submitted Tony Fryklund, choked out Joe Riggs, lost a decision to Nathan Marquardt, lost via TKO to Terry Martin and lost via armbar submission to Rousimar Palhares. After the Palhares fight, Ivan Salaverry announced his retirement. On 28 April 2011, it was announced that Salaverry would come out of retirement to replace the injured Phil Baroni at BAMMA 6. Here he fought Matt Ewin losing a disappointing decision. On 21 July 2012, he fought Fraser Opie for the Cage Contender Light Heavyweight title - coming in as a late replacement for former UFC fighter, Jeff Monson, who failed to make weight for the fight. He lost this fight in the second round due to an illegal headkick.

== Personal life ==
He opened his own gym, Ivan Salaverry MMA, October 2005, in Seattle, Washington, where he lives with his wife and two sons.

On December 11, 2015 Salaverry was promoted to black belt in Brazilian Jiu-jitsu by 5th degree black belt Marcelo Alonso in Seattle.

On May 24, 2016 he was promoted to brown belt in Judo by 2nd Degree black belt Taylan Yuasa at his own gym in Seattle.

== Championships and accomplishments ==
- Ultimate Fighting Championship
  - UFC.com Awards
    - 2005: Ranked #7 Submission of the Year vs. Joe Riggs

== Mixed martial arts record ==
Professional record breakdown
23 matches	14 wins	9 losses
By knockout	5	4
By submission	5	1
By decision	4	3
By disqualification	0	1

Res.	Record	Opponent	Method	Event	Date	Round	Time	Location	Notes
Win	14–9	Jerome Jones	Decision (unanimous)	Cage Warrior Combat 9	November 2, 2013	3	5:00	Kent, Washington, United States	Middleweight bout.
Loss	13–9	Fraser Opie	DQ (illegal kick)	Cage Contender XIV	July 21, 2012	2	N/A	Dublin, Ireland	Light Heavyweight debut; for the Cage Contender Light Heavyweight Championship, Salaverry kicked a downed opponent.
Loss	13–8	Matt Ewin	Decision (unanimous)	BAMMA 6: Watson vs. Rua	May 21, 2011	3	5:00	London, England	
Loss	13–7	Rousimar Palhares	Submission (armbar)	UFC 84	May 24, 2008	1	2:36	Las Vegas, Nevada, United States	
Loss	13–6	Terry Martin	TKO (suplex and punches)	UFC 71	May 26, 2007	1	2:04	Las Vegas, Nevada, United States	
Win	13–5	Art Santore	TKO (punches)	WFA: King of the Streets	July 22, 2006	2	4:18	Los Angeles, California, United States	
Loss	12–5	Nate Marquardt	Decision (unanimous)	UFC Ultimate Fight Night	August 6, 2005	3	5:00	Las Vegas, Nevada, United States	Marquardt tested positive for nandrolone.
Win	12–4	Joe Riggs	Submission (triangle choke)	UFC 52	April 16, 2005	1	2:42	Las Vegas, Nevada, United States	
Win	11–4	Tony Fryklund	Submission (body triangle)	UFC 50	October 22, 2004	1	1:36	Atlantic City, New Jersey, United States	
Win	10–4	Khaliun Boldbataar	Decision (unanimous)	K-1 Beast 2004 in Niigata	March 14, 2004	2	5:00	Niigata, Japan	Return to Middleweight.
Loss	9–4	Rene Rooze	TKO (dislocated finger)	K-1 Survival 2003 Japan Grand Prix Final	September 21, 2003	1	2:42	Yokohama, Japan	Heavyweight debut.
Loss	9–3	Matt Lindland	Decision (unanimous)	UFC 39	September 27, 2002	3	5:00	Uncasville, Connecticut, United States	
Win	9–2	Andrei Semenov	TKO (punches)	UFC 37	May 10, 2002	3	2:27	Bossier City, Louisiana, United States	
Win	8–2	John Renken	TKO (strikes)	HOOKnSHOOT - Overdrive	March 9, 2002	1	0:23	Evansville, Indiana, United States	
Win	7–2	Jason Rigsby	Decision	HOOKnSHOOT - Kings 2	November 18, 2001	2	5:00	Evansville, Indiana, United States	
Win	6–2	Steve Heath	TKO (cut)	IFC - Warriors Challenge 15	August 31, 2001	1	2:54	Oroville, California, United States	
Win	5–2	Dan Corpstein	KO (knees)	AMC: Revenge of the Warriors	July 21, 2001	2	N/A	Rochester, Washington, United States	
Loss	4–2	Akihiro Gono	KO (spinning back kick)	Shooto - To The Top 1	January 19, 2001	1	3:06	Tokyo, Japan	
Win	4–1	Dan Corpstein	Submission (rear-naked choke)	AMC - Path of the Warrior	December 2, 2000	2	0:52	Kirkland, Washington, United States	
Loss	3–1	Adam Ryan	KO (punches)	Western Canada's Toughest 2	August 12, 2000	N/A	N/A	Vancouver, British Columbia, Canada	
Win	3–0	Jason Derrah	Submission (armbar)	UFCF - Everett 1	June 24, 2000	2	N/A	Everett, Washington, United States	
Win	2–0	Auggie Padeken	Decision (unanimous)	SuperBrawl 17	April 15, 2000	2	5:00	Honolulu, Hawaii, United States	
Win	1–0	Peter da Silva	Submission	PPKA: Wenatchee	August 22, 1999	1	N/A	Wenatchee, Washington, United States	

== Kickboxing record ==
Kickboxing record
Result	Record	Opponent	Method	Event	Date	Round	Time	Location	Notes
Draw	0–0–1	Hiroki Kurosawa	Decision draw	K-1 Beast II 2003	July 29, 2003	3	3:00	Saitama, Japan

Legend: Win Loss Draw/No contest

== See also ==
- List of male mixed martial artists
- List of Canadian UFC fighters
