= Luigi Fioravanti =

American mixed martial arts fighter

- Born: January 22, 1981 (age 45); Orlando, Florida, United States
- Other names: The Italian Tank
- Nationality: American
- Height: 5 ft 9 in (1.75 m)
- Weight: 170 lb (77 kg; 12 st)
- Division: Middleweight; Welterweight
- Reach: 70 in (180 cm)
- Fighting out of: Orlando, Florida, United States
- Team: The Jungle MMA; American Top Team
- Rank: Second degree black belt in Pancrase Pankration; Black belt in Brazilian jiu-jitsu under Ricardo Liborio
- Years active: 2004–2016

Mixed martial arts record
- Total: 41
- Wins: 26
- By knockout: 13
- By submission: 4
- By decision: 9
- Losses: 15
- By knockout: 7
- By submission: 2
- By decision: 6

Other information
- Mixed martial arts record from Sherdog

Luigi Fioravanti (born January 22, 1981) is an American mixed martial artist who last competed in 2016. A professional since 2004, he is perhaps best known for competing in the UFC, but has also fought for M-1 Global and the Maximum Fighting Championship.

== Background ==
Fioravanti grew up in St. Petersburg, Florida, attending Pinellas Park High School, where he participated in wrestling, winning a district title, while also practicing judo. He joined the Marines after graduating high school and was part of Operation Iraqi Freedom in 2003. Fioravanti started training in various martial arts such as Brazilian Jiu-Jitsu and kickboxing while stationed in California and Iraq with the Marines. After spending five months in Iraq, Fioravanti continued training and began his professional career in early 2004.

== Mixed martial arts career ==
=== Ultimate Fighting Championship ===
Fioravanti began his professional MMA career 7-0 before losing to UFC veteran Chris Leben via unanimous decision. Fioravanti would then rattle off four straight wins, including two in the UFC, before dropping two straight fights against Jon Fitch and Forrest Petz.

Fioravanti would then split his last four fights in the UFC, before losing to Anthony Johnson and being cut by the UFC.

=== Post-UFC ===
Fioravanti has seen improved results since leaving the UFC, going 10–6 in his last 16 fights since being released, including a five fight winning streak that was snapped when he lost a unanimous decision to Andrei Semenov.

He faced Joe Doerksen at Score Fighting Series 1 on June 10, 2011. He lost via unanimous decision. Fioravanti faced former UFC welterweight contender Paul Daley at Ringside MMA 12 on October 21, 2011. He lost the fight via unanimous decision, putting him at three losses in a row.

Fioravanti snapped his three fight losing streak on May 18, 2013, when he submitted Edwin Aguilar in forty-two seconds at Flawless FC 3. Fioravanti followed up with a TKO win over Joshua Thorpe at Shamrock Promotions on October 12, 2013.

Fioravanti fought in the BattleGrounds MMA in a Single Night 8-Man Tournament. He lost his quarterfinal fight against Joe Ray via TKO in the first round.

== Championships and accomplishments ==
- Ultimate Fighting Championship
  - Knockout of the Night (One time) vs. Solomon Hutcherson

== Mixed martial arts record ==
Professional record breakdown
41 matches	26 wins	15 losses
By knockout	13	7
By submission	4	2
By decision	9	6

Res.	Record	Opponent	Method	Event	Date	Round	Time	Location	Notes
Loss	26–15	Artem Frolov	TKO (punches)	M-1 Challenge 72: Kunchenko vs. Abdulaev 2	November 18, 2016	1	2:11	Moscow, Russia	
Loss	26–14	Ramazan Emeev	TKO (corner stoppage)	M-1 Challenge 63: Puetz vs. Nemkov 2	December 4, 2015	4	5:00	St. Petersburg, Leningrad, Russia	For the M-1 Global Middleweight Championship.
Win	26–13	Sergey Kovalev	Submission (rear-naked choke)	M-1 Challenge 59: Battle of Nomads 5	July 3, 2015	2	1:56	Astana, Kazakhstan	
Loss	25–13	Nodar Kudukhashvili	Decision (unanimous)	M-1 Challenge 55: In Memory of Guram Gugenishvili	February 21, 2015	3	5:00	Tbilisi, Georgia	
Win	25–12	Ruslan Khaskhanov	TKO (punches)	M-1 Challenge 54 & ACB 12	December 17, 2014	1	3:06	St. Petersburg, Leningrad, Russia	
Loss	24–12	Joe Ray	TKO (knees and punches)	BattleGrounds MMA 5: O.N.E.	October 3, 2014	1	2:39	Tulsa, Oklahoma, United States	Welterweight bout; Tournament Quarterfinal.
Win	24–11	Joshua Thorpe	TKO (retirement)	Shamrock Promotions: Fight Night	October 12, 2013	3	2:54	St. Louis, Missouri, United States	Welterweight bout.
Win	23–11	Edwin Aguilar	Submission (rear-naked choke)	Flawless FC 3: California Love	May 18, 2013	1	0:42	Inglewood, California, United States	
Loss	22–11	Paul Daley	Decision (unanimous)	Ringside MMA 12: Daley vs. Fioravanti	October 21, 2011	3	5:00	Montreal, Quebec, Canada	Welterweight bout.
Loss	22–10	Joe Doerksen	Decision (unanimous)	Score Fighting Series 1: Mein vs. Zaromskis	June 10, 2011	3	5:00	Mississauga, Ontario, Canada	
Loss	22–9	Andrei Semenov	Decision (unanimous)	M-1 Challenge 25: Zavurov vs. Enomoto	April 28, 2011	3	5:00	St. Petersburg, Leningrad, Russia	
Win	22–8	Mike Geurin	Decision (unanimous)	Raging Wolf XI: Mayhem in the Mist	March 5, 2011	3	5:00	Niagara Falls, New York, United States	
Win	21–8	Mitch Whitesel	TKO (submission to punches)	WEF 45	January 21, 2011	2	4:41	Jacksonville, Florida, United States	
Win	20–8	Arthur Guseinov	Submission (rear-naked choke)	M-1 Challenge 22: Narkun vs. Vasilevsky	December 10, 2010	4	0:33	Moscow, Russia	
Win	19–8	Johnny Buck	Decision (unanimous)	Panama City Beach MMA: Brawl on the Beach	October 2, 2010	3	5:00	Panama City, Florida, United States	
Win	18–8	Woody Weatherby	TKO (punches)	M-1 Selection 2010: The Americas Finals	September 18, 2010	1	2:51	Atlantic City, New Jersey, United States	
Loss	17–8	John Kolosci	Submission (rear-naked choke)	Hoosier Fight Club	June 11, 2010	1	0:42	Gary, Indiana, United States	
Loss	17–7	Pete Spratt	TKO (punches)	MFC 25	May 7, 2010	3	4:02	Edmonton, Alberta, Canada	
Win	17–6	Shane Primm	Decision (unanimous)	Raging Wolf VI: Mayhem in the Mist	January 23, 2010	3	5:00	Niagara Falls, New York, United States	
Win	16–6	Matt Lagler	Decision (unanimous)	C3: Slammin Jammin Weekend 3	December 11, 2009	3	5:00	Red Rock, Oklahoma, United States	
Loss	15–6	John Alessio	KO (punches)	MFC 22	October 2, 2009	3	1:34	Edmonton, Alberta, Canada	
Win	15–5	Fabricio Nascimento	KO (punches)	Xtreme MMA Championships 1	June 18, 2009	1	4:44	Rome, Italy	
Loss	14–5	Anthony Johnson	TKO (punches)	UFC Fight Night: Lauzon vs. Stephens	February 7, 2009	1	4:39	Tampa, Florida, United States	
Win	14–4	Brodie Farber	Decision (unanimous)	UFC: Fight for the Troops	December 10, 2008	3	5:00	Fayetteville, North Carolina, United States	Catchweight (174 lbs) bout.
Loss	13–4	Diego Sanchez	TKO (knee and punches)	The Ultimate Fighter 7 Finale	June 21, 2008	3	4:07	Las Vegas, Nevada, United States	
Win	13–3	Luke Cummo	Decision (unanimous)	UFC 82	March 1, 2008	3	5:00	Columbus, Ohio, United States	
Win	12–3	Frank Camacho	TKO (doctor stoppage)	PXC 12: Settling the Score	July 12, 2007	1	N/A	Mangilao, Guam	
Loss	11–3	Forrest Petz	Decision (unanimous)	UFC Fight Night 10	June 12, 2007	3	5:00	Hollywood, Florida, United States	
Loss	11–2	Jon Fitch	Submission (rear-naked choke)	UFC 68	March 3, 2007	2	3:05	Columbus, Ohio, United States	
Win	11–1	Dave Menne	TKO (punches)	UFC Fight Night: Sanchez vs. Riggs	December 13, 2006	1	4:44	San Diego, California, United States	
Win	10–1	Hidetaka Monma	TKO (punches)	GCM: D.O.G. 7	September 9, 2006	1	2:31	Tokyo, Japan	Welterweight debut.
Win	9–1	Solomon Hutcherson	KO (punch)	The Ultimate Fighter: Team Ortiz vs. Team Shamrock Finale	June 24, 2006	1	4:15	Las Vegas, Nevada, United States	Knockout of the Night.
Win	8–1	Stephan Potvin	Decision (unanimous)	APEX: Evolution	June 10, 2006	3	5:00	Gatineau, Quebec, Canada	
Loss	7–1	Chris Leben	Decision (unanimous)	UFC Fight Night 4	April 6, 2006	3	5:00	Las Vegas, Nevada, United States	
Win	7–0	Sean Sallee	TKO (submission to punches)	Absolute Fighting Championships 15	February 18, 2006	1	1:32	Fort Lauderdale, Florida, United States	
Win	6–0	Tim Stout	Decision (unanimous)	Full Throttle 4	September 9, 2005	3	5:00	Duluth, Georgia, United States	
Win	5–0	George Allen	TKO (punches)	Real Fighting Championships 2	July 22, 2005	3	3:39	Tampa, Florida, United States	
Win	4–0	Hans Canko	TKO (punches)	North American Combat Challenge	June 18, 2005	2	2:09	Key West, Florida, United States	
Win	3–0	Manuel Garcia	TKO (corner stoppage)	Absolute Fighting Championships 12	April 30, 2005	1	5:00	Fort Lauderdale, Florida, United States	
Win	2–0	Thiago Goncalves	Decision (unanimous)	Absolute Fighting Championships 11	February 12, 2005	2	5:00	Fort Lauderdale, Florida, United States	
Win	1–0	Kiel Reid	Submission	Obaktagon Challenge 1	April 10, 2004	1	3:14	Jacksonville, Florida, United States	
