= Strikeforce: Payback =

Strikeforce mixed martial arts event in 2008

- The poster for Strikeforce: Payback
- Promotion: Strikeforce
- Date: October 3, 2008
- Venue: Broomfield Events Center
- City: Broomfield, Colorado, United States
- Attendance: 3,286

Event chronology
Strikeforce: At The Mansion II	Strikeforce: Payback	Strikeforce: Destruction

Strikeforce: Payback was a mixed martial arts event held on October 3, 2008. The event was produced by Strikeforce and took place at the Broomfield Events Center in Broomfield, Colorado. It marks the first time Strikeforce has held an event in Colorado and the main event featured a rematch between Duane Ludwig and Sammy Morgan.

== Background ==
Pat Barry was set to face Andre Walker at the event but instead signed a contract with the Ultimate Fighting Championship and was replaced by Carlos Zevallos in the bout.

== Results ==
Main card
Weight class				Method	Round	Time	Notes
Catchweight (165 lb)	Duane Ludwig	def.	Sammy Morgan	TKO (punches)	1	2:01
Middleweight	Frank Trigg	def.	Falaniko Vitale	Decision (unanimous) (29–28, 29–28, 30–27)	3	5:00
Welterweight	Donnie Liles	def.	Pete Spratt	Submission (rear-naked choke)	3	1:59
Lightweight	Billy Evangelista	def.	Luke Caudillo	Decision (unanimous) (29–28, 29–28, 30–27)	3	5:00
Light Heavyweight	Carlos Zevallos	def.	Andre Walker	TKO (punches)	1	4:49
Preliminary Card
Women's Flyweight	Michelle Waterson	def.	Tyra Parker	Submission (rear-naked choke)	1	1:20
Featherweight	Tyler Toner	def.	Ricky Johnson	TKO (punches)	2	3:44
Welterweight	Drew Dober	def.	Lumumba Sayers	KO (punch)	1	0:16
Lightweight	Alan Gomez	def.	Jordan Goodwin	Decision (unanimous)	3	5:00
Lightweight	Eric Galvan	def.	Jeremy Malaterre	Decision (split) (29–28, 30–27, 28–29)	3	5:00
Catchweight (140 lb)	Turrell Galloway	def.	Brett Tillis	Submission (rear-naked choke)	1	1:21
Flyweight	Aaron Trujillo	def.	Haven Torres	TKO (punches)	1	2:59

== See also ==
- Strikeforce (mixed martial arts)
- List of Strikeforce champions
- List of Strikeforce events
- 2008 in Strikeforce
