= The Ultimate Fighter 2 =

UFC mixed martial arts television series and event in 2005

- Season 2
- Starring: Dana White, Matt Hughes, and Rich Franklin

Release
- Original network: Spike TV
- Original release: August 22 – November 5, 2005

Season chronology
- ← Previous; The Ultimate Fighter 1 Next → The Ultimate Fighter 3

The Ultimate Fighter 2 was the second season of the mixed martial arts reality television series The Ultimate Fighter. The season featured a heavyweight and a welterweight division, with 9 fighters initially in each division. The UFC coaches for this season were welterweight and middleweight champions Matt Hughes and Rich Franklin. Season 1 coach and former UFC champion Randy Couture hosted and designed the team challenge segments, which if won would allow the winning team to pair a fighter from their team against another in elimination matches. The finale aired on November 5, 2005, and it set a ratings record for the UFC with a 2.0 overall rating. This season featured no coaches' fight because Hughes and Franklin had refused to fight each other, owing to their friendship. Although released on DVD in 2005, it has been set for re-release on September 18, 2007.

For many years, Season 2 was the only season where all fights that took place were considered as professional MMA bouts by the Nevada State Athletic Commission. However, this has recently been changed and they are now considered to be exhibition bouts.

== Cast ==
=== Coaches ===
- Matt Hughes, head coach of blue team
- Rich Franklin, head coach of green team

=== Fighters ===
- Team Franklin
  - Welterweights : Jorge Gurgel, Marcus Davis, Anthony Torres, Melvin Guillard
  - Heavyweights : Keith Jardine, Seth Petruzelli, Rashad Evans, Brad Imes
- Team Hughes
  - Welterweights : Joe Stevenson, Josh Burkman (Jason Von Flue), Sammy Morgan, Luke Cummo
  - Heavyweights : Mike Whitehead, Dan Christison, Rob MacDonald, Tom Murphy
- Unassigned
  - Kenny Stevens, Kerry Schall, Eli Joslin.

* Burkman was replaced by Von Flue due to injury on episode 2.

=== Others ===
- Hosts: Dana White, Randy Couture
- Narrator: Mike Rowe

== Episodes ==
Episode 1: A New Crop (Original Air Date: August 22, 2005)

- Matt Hughes and Rich Franklin are introduced as the new coaches.
- Heavyweight Kerry Schall is eliminated due to a knee injury.
- Eli Joslin chooses to leave the show, citing his reasons as not being able to handle the camera environment at the house.
- Kenny Stevens is chosen as the weakest welterweight and calls out Sammy Morgan to fight.
- Stevens forfeits his match saying he will not be able to make weight for the fight.

Episode 2: The Teams Are Picked (Original Air Date: August 29, 2005)

- Dan Christison joins the show to replace the injured Schall.
- A coin is flipped and Franklin chose to pick the first fighter.

Coach	1st Pick	2nd Pick	3rd Pick	4th Pick	5th Pick	6th Pick	7th Pick	8th Pick
Franklin	Keith Jardine	Jorge Gurgel	Seth Petruzelli	Marcus Davis	Rashad Evans	Anthony Torres	Melvin Guillard	Brad Imes
Hughes	Joe Stevenson	Mike Whitehead	Josh Burkman	Dan Christison	Sammy Morgan	Tom Murphy	Rob McDonald	Luke Cummo

- Team Hughes wins the welterweight challenge.
- Josh Burkman defeated Melvin Guillard by unanimous decision after three rounds.

Episode 3: No Pain, No Grain (Original Air Date: September 5, 2005)

- Josh Burkman is forced to leave the competition after breaking his arm in the match with Melvin Guillard.
- Rob MacDonald complains about his shoulder which he claims he injured very badly. His constant complaining upsets Team Hughes, especially Hughes himself.
- Jason Von Flue joins the show to replace Burkman.
- Team Hughes wins the heavyweight challenge.
- Brad Imes defeated Rob MacDonald by submission (triangle choke) at 4:07 of the first round.

Episode 4: Strategy (Original Air Date: September 12, 2005)

- Team Franklin wins the welterweight challenge.
- Joe Stevenson defeated Marcus Davis by submission (elbows) at 4:10 of the first round.

Episode 5: Leave It In The Octagon (Original Air Date: September 19, 2005)

- Team Hughes wins the heavyweight challenge.
- Rashad Evans defeated Tom Murphy by unanimous decision after three rounds.
- Evans causes controversy by "showboating" (dancing around in the octagon) at various stages of the fight, much to the chagrin of opposing coach Hughes. White states that this was one of the more boring fights he has seen.

Episode 6: Slugfest (Original Air Date: September 26, 2005)

- Hughes expresses disgust at Rashad Evans' actions in the octagon during the previous episode.
- Evans laments that Hughes was someone that he once respected and quotes Bernie Mac's "be yourself" line from House Party 3.
- Team Hughes wins the welterweight scarecrow challenge after the green team forfeits to save their fighters.
- Jason Von Flue defeated Jorge Gurgel by unanimous decision after three rounds.

Episode 7: No Respect (Original Air Date: October 3, 2005)

- Hughes does not seem to care about Jason Von Flue winning his fight with Gurgel and is even playing cards in the locker room while the doctors look at Von Flue.
- Matt Hughes says in an interview that even if Von Flue had lost, he would not have cared or considered it a loss.
- Team Franklin wins the heavyweight mud wrestling challenge.
- After receiving stitches from his fight, Von Flue does not receive any congrats from Team Hughes when he returns to the house.
- Hughes sends Von Flue over to Team Franklin for reshuffling.
- Von Flue is upset about this, especially because he won his fight, and curses Hughes.
- Seth Petruzelli defeated Dan Christison by unanimous decision after three rounds.

Episode 8: Knees And Elbows (Original Air Date: October 10, 2005)

- Team Hughes wins the welterweight "Randy Says" challenge after Jason Von Flue and Anthony Torres fail to obey Couture's directions.
- Franklin sends Brad Imes to Team Hughes for reshuffling.
- Luke Cummo defeated Anthony Torres by unanimous decision after three rounds.

Episode 9: Mental Game (Original Air Date: October 17, 2005)

- Team Hughes wins the heavyweight challenge resoundingly.
- Brad Imes is passed over for a fight due to a cut over his eye received in training, so Whitehead is chosen to fight instead.
- Rashad Evans defeats Mike Whitehead by unanimous decision after three rounds.
- The fight leaves the blue team, Hughes, and White shocked due to Whitehead's lackluster effort. White says that he choked "To the point where there is 10 seconds left and he just stops fighting, I've never seen that."

Episode 10: Killer Instinct (Original Air Date: October 24, 2005)

- After his loss to Rashad Evans, Mike Whitehead tells his team that he is done fighting. White asks him what happened because Whitehead was the favorite to win the whole thing and he simply replies "I guess I'm not a fighter."
- Jason Von Flue sustains a cut between the eyes in practice, so Marcus Davis is brought back as an alternate in the case of Von Flue being unable to fight.
- The rest of the matches are set up by White, Franklin, and Hughes with input from fighters; the matches are: Cummo against Morgan, Joe Stevenson against Von Flue, Brad Imes vs. Seth Petruzelli, and Evans against Keith Jardine.
- Luke Cummo defeated Sammy Morgan by KO (knee) at 2:05 of the second round.

Episode 11: Heavyweight Semi-Final (Original Air Date: 31 October 2005)

- Rashad Evans defeated Keith Jardine by unanimous decision after three rounds.

Episode 12: Semi-Finals Countdown (Original Air Date: November 1, 2005)

- Von Flue is cleared by the doctors to fight.
- Joe Stevenson defeated Jason Von Flue by submission (armbar) at 4:46 of the first round.
- Stevenson and Luke Cummo will face each other in the final for UFC contract.
- Brad Imes defeated Seth Petruzelli by split decision after three rounds.
- White believes that Imes did enough to win and believes that this split decision should have been unanimous.
- Petruzelli suffers extensive damage to his right ear and Imes will face Rashad Evans in the finale.
- In an interesting note, even though Cummo and Imes were both the last picked for their respective divisions, they both made it to the finale.

== Welterweight bracket ==
Semi-finals
Luke Cummo	KO
Sammy Morgan	2
Joe Stevenson	SUB
Jason Von Flue	1

Finale
Luke Cummo	3
Joe Stevenson	UD

== Heavyweight bracket ==
Semi-finals
Brad Imes	SD
Seth Petruzelli	3
Rashad Evans	UD
Keith Jardine	3

Finale
Brad Imes	3
Rashad Evans	SD

Legend

	Team Hughes
	Team Franklin
UD	Unanimous Decision
SD	Split Decision
SUB	Submission
KO	Knockout

== The Ultimate Fighter 2 Finale ==
The Ultimate Fighter: Team Hughes vs. Team Franklin Finale
- The poster for The Ultimate Fighter: Team Hughes vs. Team Franklin Finale
- Promotion: Ultimate Fighting Championship
- Date: November 5, 2005
- Venue: Hard Rock Hotel and Casino
- City: Las Vegas, Nevada

Event chronology
UFC 55: Fury	The Ultimate Fighter: Team Hughes vs. Team Franklin Finale	UFC 56: Full Force

The Ultimate Fighter: Team Hughes vs. Team Franklin Finale (also known as The Ultimate Fighter 2 Finale) was a mixed martial arts event held by the Ultimate Fighting Championship (UFC) on November 5, 2005. Featured were the finals from The Ultimate Fighter 2 in both the Welterweight and Heavyweight divisions as well as a main event between Diego Sanchez and Nick Diaz.

=== Results ===
Main Card
Weight class				Method	Round	Time	Notes
Welterweight	Diego Sanchez	def.	Nick Diaz	Decision (unanimous) (30–27, 30–27, 30–27)	3	5:00
Heavyweight	Rashad Evans	def.	Brad Imes	Decision (split) (29–28, 29–28, 28–29)	3	5:00	(Note: Evans became the Season 2 Heavyweight winner of The Ultimate Fighter.)
Welterweight	Joe Stevenson	def.	Luke Cummo	Decision (unanimous) (29–28, 30–27, 29–28)	3	5:00	(Note: Stevenson became the Season 2 Welterweight winner of The Ultimate Fighter.)
Welterweight	Kenny Florian	def.	Kit Cope	Submission (rear-naked choke)	2	0:37
Preliminary card
Welterweight	Josh Burkman	def.	Sam Morgan	KO (slam)	1	0:21
Welterweight	Melvin Guillard	def.	Marcus Davis	TKO (doctor stoppage)	2	2:55
Heavyweight	Keith Jardine	def.	Kerry Schall	TKO (leg kicks)	2	3:28

=== Encyclopedia awards ===
The following fighters were honored in the October 2011 book titled UFC Encyclopedia.

- Fight of the Night: Rashad Evans vs. Brad Imes
- Knockout of the Night: Josh Burkman
- Submission of the Night: Kenny Florian

== See also ==
- Ultimate Fighting Championship
- List of UFC champions
- List of UFC events
- 2005 in UFC
- The Ultimate Fighter
- List of current UFC fighters
