= UFC 52 =

UFC mixed martial arts event in 2005

UFC 52: Couture vs. Liddell 2
- The poster for UFC 52: Couture vs. Liddell 2
- Promotion: Ultimate Fighting Championship
- Date: April 16, 2005
- Venue: MGM Grand Arena
- City: Las Vegas, Nevada
- Attendance: 14,562 (Paid: 12,643)
- Total gate: $2,575,450
- Buyrate: 280,000

Event chronology
The Ultimate Fighter: Team Couture vs. Team Liddell Finale	UFC 52: Couture vs. Liddell 2	UFC 53: Heavy Hitters

UFC 52: Couture vs. Liddell 2 was a mixed martial arts event held by the Ultimate Fighting Championship on April 16, 2005, at the MGM Grand Arena in Las Vegas, Nevada. The event was broadcast live on pay-per-view in the United States and Canada, and later released on DVD.

== History ==
Headlining the card were the coaches of The Ultimate Fighter 1, Randy Couture and Chuck Liddell. At the time, it was the highest-grossing UFC event ever at the live gate, with $2,575,450 in ticket sales. Dan "The Beast" Severn was inducted into the UFC Hall of Fame at this event.

The total fighter payroll for UFC 52 was $519,500.

The rematch bout between Matt Hughes and Frank Trigg for the Welterweight title is one of president of the UFC Dana White's favorite fights. In 2015 during International Fight Week, this became the second fight to be inducted into the UFC Hall of Fame.

== Results ==
Main Card
Weight class				Method	Round	Time	Notes
Light Heavyweight	Chuck Liddell	def.	Randy Couture (c)	KO (punches)	1	2:06	(Note: For the UFC Light Heavyweight Championship.)
Light Heavyweight	Renato Sobral	def.	Travis Wiuff	Submission (armbar)	2	0:24
Welterweight	Matt Hughes (c)	def.	Frank Trigg	Submission (rear-naked choke)	1	4:05	(Note: For the UFC Welterweight Championship.)
Middleweight	Matt Lindland	def.	Travis Lutter	Submission (guillotine choke)	2	3:32
Welterweight	Georges St-Pierre	def.	Jason Miller	Decision (unanimous) (30–27, 30–27, 30–27)	3	5:00	(Note: This fight was originally scheduled for UFC 48, but Miller was tending to legal problems at the time.)
Preliminary card
Middleweight	Ivan Salaverry	def.	Joe Riggs	Submission (triangle choke)	1	2:42
Middleweight	Joe Doerksen	def.	Patrick Côté	Submission (rear-naked choke)	3	2:35	(Note: Doerksen entered the card as a late replacement for Lee Murray, who pulled out due to travel complications.)
Light Heavyweight	Mike van Arsdale	def.	John Marsh	Decision (unanimous) (29–28, 29–28, 29–28)	3	5:00

== Encyclopedia awards ==
The following fighters were honored in the October 2011 book titled UFC Encyclopedia.

- Fight of the Night: Matt Hughes vs. Frank Trigg
- Knockout of the Night: Chuck Liddell
- Submission of the Night: Matt Hughes

== See also ==
- Ultimate Fighting Championship
- List of UFC champions
- List of UFC events
- 2005 in UFC
