= Luke Cummo =

American mixed martial arts fighter

- Born: April 27, 1980 (age 46); New Hyde Park, New York, United States
- Other names: MasterLukey Luke Skywalker
- Height: 6 ft 0 in (1.83 m)
- Weight: 167 lb (76 kg; 11.9 st)
- Division: Welterweight
- Fighting out of: Long Island, New York, United States
- Team: Serra-Longo Fight Team
- Rank: Purple belt in Brazilian Jiu-Jitsu
- Years active: 2002-2008

Mixed martial arts record
- Total: 12
- Wins: 6
- By knockout: 4
- By submission: 1
- By decision: 1
- Losses: 6
- By decision: 6

Other information
- Mixed martial arts record from Sherdog

Luke Cummo (born April 27, 1980) is an American former mixed martial artist. A professional from 2002 until 2008, he is perhaps best remembered for his stint in the UFC and being a finalist on the reality TV series The Ultimate Fighter 2 on Spike TV.

== Mixed martial arts career ==
=== Early career ===
Cummo fights out of Long Island, where he attended Chaminade High School (class of 1998) in Mineola, New York, and works with (Matt Serra) Serra Jiu-Jitsu and Ray Longo's IMAA. Although his grappling ability has been improving, his primary style remains Muay Thai kickboxing. He also holds a Brazilian Jiu-Jitsu purple belt. He graduated from Nassau Community College with a degree in Biology.

Cummo began his professional mixed martial arts career in 2002, fighting exclusively in the Ring of Combat promotion in New Jersey. Over two-and-a-half years, he amassed a record of 3 wins and 2 losses.

=== The Ultimate Fighter 2 ===
In 2005, Cummo was selected to be a contestant on The Ultimate Fighter 2 season. He gained recognition on the show due to his personality, vegan and unorthodox diet (which according to Joe Rogan includes urine therapy when sick), his striking ability and his love of comic books. He was also the last person picked for a team on the show, fighting throughout the show as the underdog.

In his first fight, Cummo defeated Anthony Torres by unanimous decision after three rounds. In the semi-finals, Cummo faced Sammy Morgan and won by knockout via a knee at 2:05 of the second round. After winning two exhibition fights, he made it to the finals against Joe Stevenson.

=== Ultimate Fighting Championship ===
Cummo faced Joe Stevenson in an officially sanction bout at The Ultimate Fighter 2 Finale on November 5, 2005. He lost the bout via a unanimous decision. Even though Cummo lost to Stevenson, his performance earned him a UFC contract.

In Cummo's first match under a UFC contract at UFC Ultimate Fight Night 4, he defeated Jason Von Flue via unanimous decision.

In his next fight, Cummo was defeated by Canadian fighter Jonathan Goulet, who scored a decision victory over Cummo with superior wrestling and ground control.

Cummo then amassed a two fight win streak when he defeated Josh Haynes via knockout at UFC 69 on April 7, 2007, and defeated Edilberto de Oliveira via TKO at UFC Fight Night 11 on September 19, 2007.

Cummo next faced Luigi Fioravanti at UFC 82 on March 1, 2008. He lost the fight via unanimous decision.

Cummo's last fight was a unanimous decision loss to Tamdan McCrory at UFC 87. His UFC record stands at 3 wins and 4 losses.

== Personal life ==
Luke and his ex-wife Lara have two sons.

== Urine therapy ==
Cummo has endorsed urine therapy, which is the drinking of one's own urine. He has stated that this gives him an advantage over the competition due to the supposed nutritional benefits that it provides.

== Championships and accomplishments ==
- Ultimate Fighting Championship
  - Fight of the Night (One time) vs. Jonathan Goulet
  - UFC.com Awards
    - 2005: Ranked #6 Knockout of the Year, Ranked #6 Fight of the Year vs. Sammy Morgan & Ranked #9 Fight of the Year vs. Joe Stevenson

== Mixed martial arts record ==
Professional record breakdown
12 matches	6 wins	6 losses
By knockout	4	0
By submission	1	0
By decision	1	6

Res.	Record	Opponent	Method	Event	Date	Round	Time	Location	Notes
Loss	6–6	Tamdan McCrory	Decision (unanimous)	UFC 87	August 9, 2008	3	5:00	Minneapolis, Minnesota, United States	
Loss	6–5	Luigi Fioravanti	Decision (unanimous)	UFC 82	March 1, 2008	3	5:00	Columbus, Ohio, United States	
Win	6–4	Edilberto de Oliveira	TKO (strikes)	UFC Fight Night 11	September 19, 2007	1	1:45	Las Vegas, Nevada, United States	
Win	5–4	Josh Haynes	KO (punch)	UFC 69	April 7, 2007	2	2:45	Houston, Texas, United States	
Loss	4–4	Jonathan Goulet	Decision (majority)	UFC Fight Night 5	June 28, 2006	3	5:00	Las Vegas, Nevada, United States	Fight of the Night.
Win	4–3	Jason Von Flue	Decision (unanimous)	UFC Fight Night 4	April 6, 2006	3	5:00	Las Vegas, Nevada, United States	
Loss	3–3	Joe Stevenson	Decision (unanimous)	The Ultimate Fighter 2 Finale	November 5, 2005	3	5:00	Las Vegas, Nevada, United States	The Ultimate Fighter Season 2 Welterweight Tournament Final.
Loss	3–2	Josh Koscheck	Decision (unanimous)	Ring of Combat 6	April 24, 2004	3	5:00	Elizabeth, New Jersey, United States	Catchweight (175 lbs) bout.
Win	3–1	Mike Thatcher	Submission (triangle choke)	Ring of Combat 5	December 14, 2003	2	1:53	Elizabeth, New Jersey, United States	Middleweight bout.
Loss	2–1	Dave Tirelli	Decision (unanimous)	Ring of Combat 4	August 15, 2003	3	5:00	Atlantic City, New Jersey, United States	Catchweight (175 lbs) bout.
Win	2–0	Dave Tirelli	TKO (doctor stoppage)	Ring of Combat 3	June 7, 2003	2	0:46	Morristown, New Jersey, United States	Catchweight (175 lbs) bout.
Win	1–0	Kadir Kadri	TKO	Ring of Combat 1	October 12, 2002	1	2:37	Uncasville, Connecticut, United States	

== See also ==
- List of vegans
