= UFC Fight Night: Sanchez vs. Parisyan =

UFC mixed martial arts event in 2006

- The poster for UFC Fight Night: Sanchez vs. Parisyan
- Promotion: Ultimate Fighting Championship
- Date: August 17, 2006
- Venue: Red Rock Resort Spa and Casino
- City: Las Vegas, Nevada
- Total purse: $173,500

Event chronology
UFC 61: Bitter Rivals	UFC Fight Night: Sanchez vs. Parisyan	UFC 62: Liddell vs Sobral

UFC Fight Night: Sanchez vs. Parisyan (also known as UFC Fight Night 6) was a mixed martial arts event held by the Ultimate Fighting Championship on August 17, 2006. The event took place at the Red Rock Resort Spa and Casino in Las Vegas, Nevada, and was broadcast live on Spike TV in the United States and Canada. It acted as a lead-in to the season four premiere of The Ultimate Fighter. The two-hour broadcast of UFC Fight Night 6 on Spike TV drew a 1.5 overall rating.

The main event of the evening – a welterweight bout between The Ultimate Fighter superstar Diego Sanchez and former title contender Karo Parisyan – was given heightened interest, as the winner of the bout was rumored to designate the next challenger for the UFC welterweight championship.

The disclosed fighter payroll for this event was $173,500.

== Results ==
Main Card
Weight class				Method	Round	Time	Notes
Welterweight	Diego Sanchez	def.	Karo Parisyan	Decision (unanimous) (29–28, 29–28, 30–26)	3	5:00	(Note: The fight was later named UFC Fight of the Year for 2006.)
Middleweight	Chris Leben	def.	Jorge Santiago	KO (punch)	2	0:35
Middleweight	Dean Lister	def.	Yuki Sasaki	Decision (unanimous) (30–27, 30–27, 30–27)	3	5:00
Welterweight	Josh Koscheck	def.	Jonathan Goulet	Submission (punches)	1	4:10
Preliminary Card
Middleweight	Martin Kampmann	def.	Crafton Wallace	Submission (rear-naked choke)	1	2:59
Welterweight	Joe Riggs	def.	Jason Von Flue	Submission (triangle choke)	1	2:01	(Note: This bout was aired on the broadcast.)
Heavyweight	Jake O'Brien	def.	Kristof Midoux	TKO (punches)	2	0:52
Welterweight	Forrest Petz	def.	Sam Morgan	Decision (unanimous) (30–27, 30–26, 30–23)	3	5:00	(Note: The third score marks the widest point margin in a three-round fight in UFC history.)
Welterweight	Anthony Torres	def.	Pat Healy	Submission (rear-naked choke)	1	2:37

== Bonus awards ==
- Fight of the Night: Diego Sanchez vs. Karo Parisyan
- Knockout of the Night: Chris Leben
- Submission of the Night: Joe Riggs

== Reported payouts ==
Diego Sanchez: $32,000

Joe Riggs: $24,000

Dean Lister: $16,000

Josh Koscheck: $14,000

Chris Leben: $14,000

Karo Parisyan: $12,000

Anthony Torres: $10,000

Martin Kampmann: $10,000

Jonathan Goulet: $6,500

Jake O’Brien: $6,000

Jason Von Flue: $5,000

Yuki Sasaki: $5,000

Sam Morgan: $4,000

Jorge Santiago:' $4,000

Forrest Petz: $4,000

Crafton Wallace: $3,000

Kristof Midoux: $2,000

Pat Healy: $2,000

Disclosed Fighter Payroll: $173,500

== See also ==
- Ultimate Fighting Championship
- List of UFC champions
- List of UFC events
- 2006 in UFC
