= UFC 54 =

UFC mixed martial arts event in 2005

UFC 54: Boiling Point
- The poster for UFC 54: Boiling Point
- Promotion: Ultimate Fighting Championship
- Date: August 20, 2005
- Venue: MGM Grand Arena
- City: Las Vegas, Nevada
- Attendance: 13,520 (Paid: 11,634)
- Total gate: $2,336,000
- Buyrate: 150,000

Event chronology
UFC Ultimate Fight Night	UFC 54: Boiling Point	Ultimate Fight Night 2

UFC 54: Boiling Point was a mixed martial arts event held by the Ultimate Fighting Championship on August 20, 2005, at the MGM Grand Arena in Las Vegas, Nevada. The event was broadcast live on pay-per-view in the United States, and later released on DVD.

== History ==
A UFC Light Heavyweight Championship bout between reigning champion Chuck Liddell and Jeremy Horn served as the event’s headliner.

== Results ==
Main Card
Weight class				Method	Round	Time	Notes
Light Heavyweight	Chuck Liddell (c)	def.	Jeremy Horn	TKO (punches)	4	2:46	(Note: For the UFC Light Heavyweight Championship. At that time, Horn informed the referee that he could no longer see properly, and the official called the bout.)
Heavyweight	Tim Sylvia	def.	Tra Telligman	KO (head kick)	1	4:59
Light Heavyweight	Randy Couture	def.	Mike Van Arsdale	Submission (anaconda choke)	3	0:52
Welterweight	Diego Sanchez	def.	Brian Gassaway	TKO (submission to punches)	2	1:56
Welterweight	Georges St-Pierre	def.	Frank Trigg	Submission (rear-naked choke)	1	4:09
Preliminary card
Middleweight	Matt Lindland	def.	Joe Doerksen	Decision (unanimous) (30–27, 29–28, 30–27)	3	5:00	(Note: The bout, although preliminary, was aired on the broadcast.)
Middleweight	Trevor Prangley	def.	Travis Lutter	Decision (unanimous) (30–27, 30–27, 30–26)	3	5:00
Light Heavyweight	James Irvin	def.	Terry Martin	KO (flying knee)	2	0:09	(Note: The bout, although preliminary, was aired on the broadcast.)

== Encyclopedia awards ==
The following fighters were honored in the October 2011 book titled UFC Encyclopedia.

- Fight of the Night: Chuck Liddell vs. Jeremy Horn
- Knockout of the Night: James Irvin
- Submission of the Night: Randy Couture

== See also ==
- Ultimate Fighting Championship
- List of UFC champions
- List of UFC events
- 2005 in UFC

== Sources ==
- UFC 54: Boiling Point Results on Sherdog.com
- "Ultimate Fighting Championship Cards" on Wrestling Information Archives
- UFC 54 Fighter Salaries
