= Frank Trigg =

American sport wrestler, mixed martial artist (born 1972)

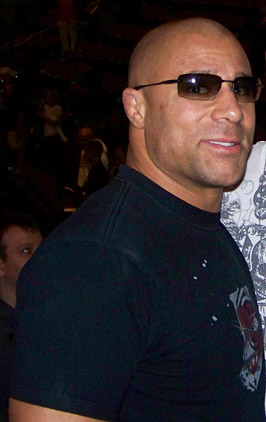
- Born: May 7, 1972 (age 54); Kendall, New York, U.S
- Nickname: Twinkle Toes
- Height: 5 ft 8 in (173 cm)
- Weight: 181 lb (82 kg; 12 st 13 lb)
- Division: Welterweight; Middleweight
- Reach: 71 in (180 cm)
- Stance: Southpaw
- Fighting out of: Rochester, New York, U.S
- Team: Xtreme Couture
- Rank: Black belt in Submission Fighting under Neil Melanson; 2nd degree black belt in Judo
- Wrestling: NCAA Division I Wrestling
- Years active: 1997–2011

Mixed martial arts record
- Total: 30
- Wins: 21
- By knockout: 12
- By submission: 4
- By decision: 5
- Losses: 9
- By knockout: 4
- By submission: 4
- By decision: 1

Other information
- University: University of Oklahoma
- Notable school: East Ridge JR-SR High School
- Website: http://franktrigg.com/
- Mixed martial arts record from Sherdog

Frank Trigg (born May 7, 1972) is an American retired mixed martial artist, color commentator, pro wrestler, MMA referee and TV host. Trigg is a veteran of the UFC, Pride Fighting Championships, BAMMA, and the World Fighting Alliance, where he was the promotion's only Welterweight champion. He has professional wrestling appearances in Total Nonstop Action Wrestling.

== Mixed martial arts career ==
After years of training in Wrestling and Tai Chi, Trigg in 1995, began studying Judo under Sensei and former Olympian, Patrick Burris. It was while training with Burris that Trigg earned his first black belt and was introduced to the world of Mixed Martial Arts.

A high school state champion wrestler in his native New York, Trigg initially wrestled at Oklahoma State as a walk-on before transferring to Phoenix College. After finishing second in the NJCAA championships, he returned to the NCAA ranks when OSU's arch-rivals Oklahoma offered him a scholarship. After receiving his bachelor's degree in Public Affairs and Administration from OU in 1997, Trigg stayed on as an assistant coach for the Sooners. Frustrated with his place in the US wrestling pecking order, he started a professional MMA career, using his purses to pay for flights to enter international freestyle wrestling tournaments. In 1999, Trigg fought at Pride 8 in Japan, defeating Fabiano Iha via TKO due to strikes. Less than a year later, in early 2000, Trigg qualified as an Olympic Trials Finalist in wrestling.

Beating some of the World's best athletes convinced Trigg that a legitimate professional wrestling and mixed martial arts career was the next step. By the end of 2000, Trigg fought the Shooto world champion Hayato Sakurai for his title. While Trigg initially controlled the bout, Sakurai staged a comeback and brutally knocked Trigg out in the second round due to knees, handing Trigg his first career loss.

Trigg joined the World Fighting Alliance from 2001 to 2002, where he held the WFA welterweight title. Trigg was undefeated in WFA.

After several successful years with the WFA, in 2003, Trigg joined the premier organization in the world for MMA, the Ultimate Fighting Championship (UFC). Trigg earned an immediate title shot against champion Matt Hughes at UFC 45: Revolution. After a tactical grappling match-up early on, Trigg fell victim to a rear naked choke in the first round.

Trigg rebounded quickly, defeating Dennis Hallman and Renato Verissimo in UFC 48 and UFC 50 to earn another shot at Hughes' Welterweight Championship.

In their second fight at UFC 52, Trigg had Hughes at the brink of defeat after an illegal groin strike went unnoticed by referee Mario Yamasaki. Hughes went on to reverse position, and slam Trigg to the mat before locking in a rear naked choke late in round one. This was considered one of the greatest comebacks in UFC history. After this loss, fans of Frank Trigg affectionately termed the choke the "rear naked Trigg."

Trigg returned at UFC 54 to take on future welterweight champion Georges St-Pierre where he lost by a rear naked choke in the opening round. The loss would be Trigg's final appearance in the UFC until UFC 103, almost 50 events later.

=== First UFC Release ===
After not securing another fight in the UFC, Trigg participated in Rumble on the Rock's 2006 welterweight tournament, winning his first round fight against Ronald Jhun. He was upset in the second round by Carlos Condit.

Trigg remained inactive after that loss, focusing on his broadcasting job with Pride FC.

He won the Icon Sport Middleweight title on December 6, 2006, TKO-ing Jason "Mayhem" Miller.

His next fight was on at Pride 33, on February 24, 2007, against Middleweight Grand Prix champion Kazuo Misaki. Trigg out wrestled Misaki and maintained control on the ground, winning by a 30–27 unanimous decision.

A month later, on March 31, 2007, Trigg unsuccessfully defended his Icon Sport middleweight title against Robbie Lawler, losing in the fourth round via KO.

On December 17, 2007, Trigg beat Edwin Dewees in the first round by submission at HDNet Fights- Reckless Abandon.[2] On August 24, 2008, Trigg traveled to Japan to compete at Sengoku 4 where he bested 2000 Judo Olympic Gold Medalist Makoto Takimoto via a unanimous decision. On October 3, 2008, Trigg won a unanimous decision over Falaniko Vitale at Strikeforce: Payback in Denver, Colorado. On February 14, 2009, Trigg won a unanimous decision over Danny Babcock (5–2) at XCF: Rumble in Racetown in Daytona, FL.

=== Return to UFC (2009–2010) ===
On May 27, 2009, Trigg re-signed with the UFC after agreeing to a four-fight deal with the company. He returned to the welterweight division against Ultimate Fighter veteran Josh Koscheck at UFC 103. Koscheck defeated Trigg via first-round TKO.

After this disappointing loss, Trigg went on to face the former UFC welterweight champion Matt Serra at UFC 109, and lost for a second time since his return via KO (punches) in the first round.

Trigg was released by the UFC following his loss to Serra.

=== Late career ===
Trigg returned for the inaugural Israel Fighting Championship on November 9. Trigg easily defeated Roy Neeman by strikes in the first round. After the fight, he said he didn't really know what was next for him.

At BAMMA 6, Trigg defeated British standout John Phillips by TKO (doctor stoppage) in round 1.

Trigg was scheduled to be the main event at BAMMA 7 against Tom Watson for the Middleweight title. However, on August 9, it was announced that Watson had to pull out due to a back injury and would be replaced by Jim Wallhead in a non-title fight. Trigg lost the fight via split decision.

On July 11, 2015, Trigg was inducted into the newly restructured UFC Hall of Fame in the fights wing along with Matt Hughes for their second fight at UFC 52.

== Total Nonstop Action Wrestling ==
In addition to MMA, Frank Trigg was also an analyst and on-screen character in Total Nonstop Action Wrestling in 2008, aligning himself with Kurt Angle, who used his passing resemblance to Trigg as part of a storyline. At No Surrender (2008) he faced A.J. Styles in an MMA style match, the match going to a draw due to an "unintentional" low blow on Trigg. The crowd was hostile to both combatants, chanting "This is bullshit", "We want wrestling", and "Fire Russo". After the match, Styles beat down Trigg using a kendo stick and declared that "I'm a wrestler, I don't do this crap!".

In 2019, Trigg appeared as the trainer for Moose in the build up for his Bound for Glory match with Ken Shamrock. On 20 October 2019, Trigg was in the corner of Moose and interfered several times in the match, most notably removing a turnbuckle pad which Ken Shamrock was thrown into resulting in a Moose victory.

== MMA refereeing ==
Long a critic of MMA officiating stemming from his second fight with Hughes, Trigg was approached by veteran referee "Big John" McCarthy in 2011 with the offer to take his official's training course. Trigg spent several sessions with McCarthy learning the ins and outs of being an MMA referee, and began officiating amateur fights in 2014. On December 9, 2017, Trigg made his UFC debut as a referee, officiating a match-up between Alexis Davis and Liz Carmouche at UFC Fight Night 123.

== Personal life ==
Frank Trigg has four children; Frankie, Kiara, Stone, and Lavin. Trigg welcomed his son Stone in September 2008. On October 2, 2010, Trigg welcomed his son Lavin.

In 2006, he appeared in the episode "Fight Schlub" on the sitcom The King of Queens. He has mostly worked as a stuntman since retirement from fighting, with credits including extensive work on the re-make of Hawaii Five-0. Frank is also a member of Phi Beta Sigma fraternity, initiated in 1997 at the Xi Delta chapter at the University of Oklahoma

He is the second retired UFC fighter to return as a UFC referee, with the first being Dan Severn.

== Championships and accomplishments ==
- Ultimate Fighting Championship
  - UFC Hall of Fame (Fight Wing, Class of 2015) vs. Matt Hughes 2 at UFC 52
  - UFC Encyclopedia Awards
    - Fight of the Night (Two times) vs. Renato Verissimo and Matt Hughes 2
  - UFC.com Awards
    - 2005: Ranked #2 Fight of the Year vs. Matt Hughes 2 & Ranked #10 Fight of the Year vs. Georges St. Pierre
- World Fighting Alliance
  - WFA Welterweight Championship (One time)
- Icon Sport
  - Icon Sport Middleweight Championship (One time)

== Mixed martial arts record ==
Professional record breakdown
| 30 matches | 21 wins | 9 losses |
| By knockout | 12 | 4 |
| By submission | 4 | 4 |
| By decision | 5 | 1 |

| Res. | Record | Opponent | Method | Event | Date | Round | Time | Location | Notes |
|---|---|---|---|---|---|---|---|---|---|
| Loss | 21–10 | Jim Wallhead | Decision (split) | BAMMA 7: Trigg vs. Wallhead | September 10, 2011 | 3 | 5:00 | Birmingham, England | |
| Win | 21–9 | John Phillips | TKO (punches) | BAMMA 6: Watson vs. Rua | May 21, 2011 | 1 | 2:41 | London, England | |
| Win | 20–9 | Roy Neeman | TKO (punches) | Israel FC: Genesis | November 9, 2010 | 1 | 2:36 | Tel Aviv, Israel | Catchweight (181 lb) |
| Loss | 19–9 | Matt Serra | TKO (punches) | UFC 109 | February 6, 2010 | 1 | 2:23 | Las Vegas, Nevada, United States | |
| Loss | 19–8 | Josh Koscheck | TKO (punches) | UFC 103 | September 19, 2009 | 1 | 1:25 | Dallas, Texas, United States | |
| Win | 19–7 | Danny Babcock | Decision (unanimous) | XCF: Rumble in Racetown 1 | February 14, 2009 | 3 | 5:00 | Daytona, Florida, United States | |
| Win | 18–7 | Falaniko Vitale | Decision (unanimous) | Strikeforce: Payback | October 3, 2008 | 3 | 5:00 | Broomfield, Colorado, United States | |
| Win | 17–7 | Makoto Takimoto | Decision (unanimous) | World Victory Road Presents: Sengoku 4 | September 24, 2008 | 3 | 5:00 | Saitama, Saitama, Japan | |
| Win | 16–7 | Edwin Dewees | Submission (kimura) | HDNet Fights: Reckless Abandon | December 15, 2007 | 1 | 1:40 | Dallas, Texas, United States | |
| Loss | 15–6 | Robbie Lawler | KO (punches) | Icon Sport: Epic | March 31, 2007 | 4 | 1:40 | Honolulu, Hawaii, United States | Lost the Icon Sport Middleweight Championship. |
| Win | 15–5 | Kazuo Misaki | Decision (unanimous) | Pride 33 | February 24, 2007 | 3 | 5:00 | Las Vegas, Nevada, United States | |
| Win | 14–5 | Jason Miller | TKO (soccer kicks) | Icon Sport - Mayhem vs. Trigg | December 1, 2006 | 2 | 2:53 | Honolulu, Hawaii, United States | Won the Icon Sport Middleweight Championship. |
| Loss | 13–5 | Carlos Condit | Submission (triangle armbar) | Rumble on the Rock 9 | April 21, 2006 | 1 | 1:22 | Honolulu, Hawaii, United States | ROTR Welterweight Tournament Second Round. |
| Win | 13–4 | Ronald Jhun | Decision (unanimous) | Rumble on the Rock 8 | January 20, 2006 | 3 | 5:00 | Honolulu, Hawaii, United States | ROTR Welterweight Tournament Opening Round. |
| Loss | 12–4 | Georges St-Pierre | Submission (rear-naked choke) | UFC 54 | August 20, 2005 | 1 | 4:09 | Las Vegas, Nevada, United States | |
| Loss | 12–3 | Matt Hughes | Submission (rear-naked choke) | UFC 52 | April 16, 2005 | 1 | 4:05 | Las Vegas, Nevada, United States | For the UFC Welterweight Championship. |
| Win | 12–2 | Renato Verissimo | TKO (elbows) | UFC 50 | October 22, 2004 | 2 | 2:11 | Atlantic City, New Jersey, United States | |
| Win | 11–2 | Dennis Hallman | TKO (punches) | UFC 48 | June 19, 2004 | 1 | 4:15 | Las Vegas, Nevada, United States | |
| Loss | 10–2 | Matt Hughes | Submission (standing rear-naked choke) | UFC 45 | November 21, 2003 | 1 | 3:54 | Uncasville, Connecticut, United States | For the UFC Welterweight Championship. |
| Win | 10–1 | Dennis Hallman | TKO (punches) | WFA 3: Level 3 | November 23, 2002 | 1 | 3:50 | Las Vegas, Nevada, United States | Won the WFA Welterweight Championship. |
| Win | 9–1 | Jason Medina | TKO (submission to elbows) | WFA 2: Level 2 | July 5, 2002 | 1 | 3:43 | Las Vegas, Nevada, United States | |
| Win | 8–1 | Laverne Clark | TKO (submission to punches and elbows) | World Fighting Alliance 1 | November 3, 2001 | 3 | 2:15 | Las Vegas, Nevada, United States | |
| Loss | 7–1 | Hayato Sakurai | TKO (knees) | Shooto: R.E.A.D. Final | December 17, 2000 | 2 | 2:25 | Chiba, Chiba, Japan | |
| Win | 7–0 | Ray Cooper | Submission (forearm choke) | WEF: New Blood Conflict | August 26, 2000 | 2 | 3:05 | N/A | |
| Win | 6–0 | Fabiano Iha | TKO (punches) | Pride 8 | November 21, 1999 | 1 | 5:00 | Tokyo, Japan | |
| Win | 5–0 | Jean Jacques Machado | TKO (corner stoppage) | Vale Tudo Japan 1998 | October 25, 1998 | 3 | 0:20 | Tokyo, Japan | |
| Win | 4–0 | Marcelo Aguiar | TKO (punches) | Shooto - Las Grandes Viajes 3 | May 13, 1998 | 2 | 3:08 | Tokyo, Japan | |
| Win | 3–0 | Dan Gilbert | Submission (forearm choke) | Unified Shoot Wrestling Federation 7 | October 18, 1997 | 1 | 2:45 | Texas, United States | |
| Win | 2–0 | Javier Buentello | Submission (rear-naked choke) | Unified Shoot Wrestling Federation 7 | October 18, 1997 | 1 | 2:35 | Texas, United States | |
| Win | 1–0 | Ali Elias | KO (knee) | Unified Shoot Wrestling Federation 7 | October 18, 1997 | 1 | 10:36 | Texas, United States | |

== Submission Grappling Record ==
3 Matches, 0 Wins, 3 Losses
| Result | Rec. | Opponent | Method | Event | Division | Date | Location | Notes |
| Loss | 0-3 | (United States) Dennis Hallman | Submission (Heel Hook) | ADCC 2005 | –88 kg | 2005 | United States | |
| Loss | 0-2 | (Brazil) Renzo Gracie | Referee Decision | ADCC 1998 | –77 kg | 1998 | (United Arab Emirates) Abu Dhabi | |
| Loss | 0-1 | (United States) Bill Simpson | Submission (Guillotine Choke) | ACE World Series of Martial Arts | –77 kg | August 26, 1995 | (United States) Tulsa | catch wrestling ruleset, Judo vs Wrestling |

== See also ==
- List of male mixed martial artists
- List of Phi Beta Sigma brothers
