= Forrest Petz =

American mixed martial arts fighter

- Born: September 22, 1975 (age 51); Cleveland, Ohio, United States
- Other names: The Meat Cleaver
- Height: 5 ft 9 in (175 cm)
- Weight: 185 lb (84 kg; 13 st 3 lb)
- Division: Middleweight; Welterweight
- Reach: 73 in (185 cm)
- Stance: Orthodox
- Fighting out of: Cleveland, Ohio, United States
- Team: Strong Style Fight Team
- Years active: 2002–2013

Mixed martial arts record
- Total: 36
- Wins: 26
- By knockout: 13
- By submission: 4
- By decision: 9
- Losses: 10
- By knockout: 2
- By submission: 4
- By decision: 4

Other information
- Mixed martial arts record from Sherdog

Forrest Leonard Petz (born September 22, 1975) is a retired American mixed martial artist. A professional from 2002 until 2013, he is perhaps best known for his two stints in the UFC, but also fought for King of the Cage and Adrenaline MMA.

== Background ==
Petz was born and raised in Cleveland, Ohio. He attended and graduated from the Cleveland School of Science High School, and worked as a bouncer before becoming a professional fighter.

== Mixed martial arts career ==
=== Ultimate Fighting Championship ===
Petz made his UFC debut at Ultimate Fight Night 6 against Sammy Morgan. He won via unanimous decision with one of the judges scoring the fight 30-23 including one of the only 10-7 rounds in UFC history. This is the most lopsided scorecard for a three-round fight in UFC history. Petz's 5 knockdowns of Morgan are also a UFC record.

He lost his next two bouts to Marcus Davis and Kuniyoshi Hironaka before rebounding with a win over Luigi Fioravanti. After losing his next fight against Josh Burkman, Petz was released from the organization with a 2–3 record.

=== Return to UFC ===
Petz was re-signed with the UFC, stepping in as a late replacement to fight Daniel Roberts on July 3, 2010, at UFC 116. He lost the fight via split decision.

Petz then faced Brian Foster on September 15, 2010, at UFC Fight Night 22. He lost the fight via TKO in the first round. Following the loss he was once again released by the UFC.

=== Score Fighting Series ===
After winning three fights following his release from the UFC, Petz joined the Score Fighting Series. In his first bout with SFS, he won the night's Fight of the Night with a TKO win over Sergey Juskevic.

After winning his SFS debut, Petz again fought for the Score Fighting Series in Hamilton, Ontario on November 23, 2012. He faced Canadian prospect Jordan Mein in the main event. He lost via TKO early in the first round.

== Championships and accomplishments ==
- North American Allied Fight Series
  - NAAFS Welterweight Championship (One time)
- Fight Fest MMA
  - Fight Fest Welterweight Champion (One time)

== Mixed martial arts record ==
Professional record breakdown
36 matches	26 wins	10 losses
By knockout	13	2
By submission	4	4
By decision	9	4

Res.	Record	Opponent	Method	Event	Date	Round	Time	Location	Notes
Win	26–10	Chris Curtis	Decision (unanimous)	NAAFS: Fight Night in the Flats 9	June 1, 2013	3	5:00	Cleveland, Ohio, United States	Middleweight bout.
Loss	25–10	Jordan Mein	TKO (knees and elbows)	Score Fighting Series 7	November 23, 2012	1	1:29	Hamilton, Ontario, Canada	
Win	25–9	Sergej Juskevic	TKO (punches)	Score Fighting Series 4	March 16, 2012	2	3:25	Hamilton, Ontario, Canada	
Win	24–9	Rudy Bears	TKO (punches)	C3 Fights: Great Plains Sizzling Slamfest	July 30, 2011	1	2:55	Newkirk, Oklahoma, United States	
Win	23–9	John Kolosci	TKO (punches)	HFC 7: Validation	April 9, 2011	2	0:56	Valparaiso, Indiana, United States	
Win	22–9	Herbert Goodman	Decision (unanimous)	Ultimate Cage Battle: Pride & Glory	January 15, 2011	3	5:00	Parma, Ohio, United States	Middleweight bout.
Loss	21–9	Brian Foster	TKO (punches)	UFC Fight Night: Marquardt vs. Palhares	September 15, 2010	1	1:07	Austin, Texas, United States	
Loss	21–8	Daniel Roberts	Decision (split)	UFC 116	July 3, 2010	3	5:00	Las Vegas, Nevada, United States	
Win	21–7	Ralph Johnson	Decision (unanimous)	Moosin: God of Martial Arts	May 21, 2010	3	5:00	Worcester, Massachusetts, United States	
Win	20–7	Brendan Seguin	Decision (unanimous)	NAAFS: Night of Champions	December 5, 2009	5	5:00	Akron, Ohio, United States	Won the NAAFS Welterweight Championship.
Win	19–7	Chad Reiner	TKO (punches)	Adrenaline MMA 4: Sylvia vs. Riley	September 18, 2009	1	2:28	Council Bluffs, Iowa, United States	
Win	18–7	Tiawan Howard	TKO (punches)	NAAFS: Fight Nite in the Flats 5	June 6, 2009	3	3:01	Cleveland, Ohio, United States	
Loss	17–7	Victor O'Donnell	Submission (rear-naked choke)	ICF: Breakout	April 11, 2009	2	4:46	Cincinnati, Ohio, United States	
Loss	17–6	T. J. Grant	Submission (arm-triangle choke)	TKO 35: Quenneville vs. Hioki	October 3, 2008	2	3:55	Montreal, Quebec, Canada	
Win	17–5	Brian Gassaway	Decision (unanimous)	Adrenaline MMA: Guida vs Russow	June 14, 2008	3	5:00	Chicago, Illinois, United States	
Loss	16–5	Josh Burkman	Decision (split)	UFC 77	October 20, 2007	3	5:00	Cincinnati, Ohio, United States	
Win	16–4	Luigi Fioravanti	Decision (unanimous)	UFC Fight Night 10	June 12, 2007	3	5:00	Hollywood, Florida, United States	
Loss	15–4	Kuniyoshi Hironaka	Decision (unanimous)	UFC Fight Night: Stevenson vs. Guillard	April 5, 2007	3	5:00	Las Vegas, Nevada, United States	
Loss	15–3	Marcus Davis	Submission (guillotine choke)	Ortiz vs. Shamrock 3: The Final Chapter	October 10, 2006	1	4:58	Hollywood, Florida, United States	
Win	15–2	Sammy Morgan	Decision (unanimous)	UFC Fight Night 6	August 17, 2006	3	5:00	Las Vegas, Nevada, United States	
Win	14–2	Dan Hardy	Decision (unanimous)	FF 2: Fightfest 2	April 14, 2006	5	5:00	Canton, Ohio, United States	Won the Fightfest Welterweight Championship.
Win	13–2	Daniel Moraes	TKO (retirement)	GFC: Team Gracie vs. Team Hammer House	March 3, 2006	3	2:33	Columbus, Ohio, United States	
Win	12–2	Wayne Hajicek	Submission (rear-naked choke)	FF 1: Royce Gracie Fightfest	December 9, 2005	1	0:35	Evansville, Indiana, United States	
Loss	11–2	Josh Neer	Submission (triangle choke)	FFC 15: Fiesta Las Vegas	September 14, 2005	1	3:25	Las Vegas, Nevada, United States	
Win	11–1	Charles Bennett	Submission (arm-triangle choke)	KOTC 48: Payback	February 25, 2005	1	3:40	Cleveland, Ohio, United States	Welterweight debut.
Win	10–1	Rhomez Brower	KO (punches)	KOTC 45: King of the Cage 45	November 20, 2004	1	N/A	Indiana, United States	
Loss	9–1	Jake Short	Decision (unanimous)	FFC 12: Freestyle Fighting Championships 12	September 24, 2004	3	N/A	Indiana, United States	
Win	9–0	Adrian Serrano	Submission (verbal)	FCC 15: Freestyle Combat Challenge 15	June 12, 2004	2	2:06	Racine, Wisconsin, United States	
Win	8–0	Mike O'Donnell	TKO (punches)	KOTC 34: Ohio	February 28, 2004	1	N/A	Canton, Ohio, United States	
Win	7–0	Leo Sylvest	TKO (punches)	ACC 1: Absolute Combat Challenge 1	July 19, 2003	2	0:14	Canton, Ohio, United States	
Win	6–0	Joe Thomas	KO (punch)	ACC 1: Absolute Combat Challenge 1	July 19, 2003	2	0:09	Canton, Ohio, United States	
Win	5–0	Chris Wells	Decision (unanimous)	Midevils Mayhem 1	April 19, 2003	2	5:00	Newport, Kentucky, United States	
Win	4–0	Tierre Hall	Submission	HHFN: Hammer House Fight Night	December 14, 2002	1	N/A	Cleveland, Ohio, United States	
Win	3–0	Daniel McRae	TKO (punches)	Rage on the River 1	September 28, 2002	1	3:42	Portsmouth, Ohio, United States	
Win	2–0	Ed Willis	TKO (submission to punches)	ETC: July 2002	July 20, 2002	1	0:47	Mt. Healthy, Ohio, United States	
Win	1–0	Chad Roarke	TKO (punches)	Dangerzone: Fight Night 2	January 13, 2002	1	1:44	Fort Wayne, Indiana, United States	
