= Joe Doerksen =

Canadian mixed martial arts fighter

- Born: Joseph Daniel Doerksen; October 9, 1977 (age 49); New Bothwell, Manitoba, Canada
- Other names: El Dirte
- Height: 6 ft 0 in (183 cm)
- Weight: 186 lb (84 kg; 13 st 4 lb)
- Division: Light Heavyweight; Middleweight; Welterweight
- Reach: 74 in (190 cm)
- Stance: Orthodox
- Fighting out of: Winnipeg, Manitoba, Canada
- Rank: Black belt in Brazilian Jiu-Jitsu
- Years active: 1999–2014

Mixed martial arts record
- Total: 67
- Wins: 51
- By knockout: 10
- By submission: 33
- By decision: 8
- Losses: 16
- By knockout: 7
- By submission: 4
- By decision: 5

Other information
- Mixed martial arts record from Sherdog

Joseph Daniel Doerksen (born October 9, 1977) is a Canadian retired mixed martial artist. A professional from 1999 until 2014, he fought in the UFC, WEC, IFL, King of the Cage, Aggression Fighting Championship, World Victory Road, RINGS, SuperBrawl and DEEP.

== Mixed martial arts career ==
=== Early career ===
Doerksen started his career in 1999, when he entered the first Bas Rutten Invitational on February 6, 1999, defeating three different opponents by submission before losing to UFC vet Eugene Jackson by submission.

His next notable fight was against now-UFC Hall of Famer Matt Hughes at Extreme Challenge 29 on November 13, 1999, losing by second round submission (punches).

=== Ultimate Fighting Championship ===
In his first fight in the UFC, Doerksen faced Joe Riggs at UFC 49 on August 21, 2004. He lost the fight via second round submission.

He then faced Patrick Cote at UFC 52 on April 16, 2005. Doerksen won the fight via rear-naked choke submission.

In his third fight with the promotion, Doerksen faced Matt Lindland at UFC 54 on August 20, 2005. He lost the fight via unanimous decision.

Doerksen faced Nate Marquardt at UFC 58 on March 4, 2006. He lost the fight via unanimous decision and was subsequently released from the promotion.

In November 2006, Doerksen signed a contract with the PRIDE Fighting Championships, but with Zuffa's purchase of the PRIDE organization in the spring of 2007, Doerksen's contract saw him enter the WEC organization instead.

=== World Extreme Cagefighting ===
His first fight in the organization was against PRIDE veteran Paulo Filho for the vacant WEC middleweight championship at WEC 29 on August 5, 2007. Doerksen lost the fight via TKO in the first round.

=== Return to the UFC ===
Following his loss to Filho, Doerksen returned to the UFC and faced Ed Herman at UFC 78 on November 17, 2007. He lost the fight via third-round KO.

In his next fight, Doerksen faced Jason MacDonald at UFC 83 on April 19, 2008. He lost the fight via TKO (elbows) and was once again released from the promotion.

=== Post-UFC ===
After his UFC release, Doerksen signed with World Victory Road promotion in October 2008, and would make his debut against Izuru Takeuchi at Sengoku 6 on November 1, 2008. He won the fight via TKO.

Doerksen defeated Gregory Babene via triangle-choke submission at Canadian Fighting Championship 2 on May 22, 2009.

He then returned to WVR and faced Takenori Sato at Sengoku 10 on September 23, 2009. Doerksen won the fight via KO.

=== Third UFC stint ===
Riding a five-fight win streak, Doerksen returned to the UFC to face Tom Lawlor on May 8, 2010 at UFC 113, replacing an injured Tim Credeur. Following a first round in which he was rocked by Lawlor, Doerksen rebounded and won via submission (rear-naked choke) in the second round.

Doerksen next faced CB Dollaway on September 25, 2010 at UFC 119. He lost the fight via guillotine choke in the first round.

Doerksen then faced Dan Miller on December 11, 2010 at UFC 124. He lost the fight via split decision and was subsequently released from the promotion.

=== Retirement ===
Doerksen announced his retirement from MMA competition on August 21, 2015.

== Documentary ==
Doerksen was the subject of a 2013 documentary by filmmaker BJ Verot called Scheduled Violence.

== Championships and accomplishments ==
- Icon Sport
  - SuperBrawl 30 Middleweight Tournament Winner
- Freestyle Fighting Championships
  - FFC Middleweight Championship (One Time)
- Ultimate Fighting Championship
  - UFC.com Awards
    - 2005: Ranked #9 Submission of the Year vs. Patrick Côté
    - 2010: Ranked #10 Upset of the Year vs. Tom Lawlor

== Mixed martial arts record ==
Professional record breakdown
67 matches	51 wins	16 losses
By knockout	10	7
By submission	33	4
By decision	8	5

Res.	Record	Opponent	Method	Event	Date	Round	Time	Location	Notes
Win	51–16	Tony Lopez	Decision (unanimous)	King of the Cage: Madness	September 19, 2014	3	5:00	Winnipeg, Manitoba, Canada	Light Heavyweight bout.
Win	50–16	Mike Kent	Submission (armbar)	Canadian Fighting Championship 8	September 13, 2013	1	2:29	Winnipeg, Manitoba, Canada	
Win	49–16	Kalib Starnes	Decision (unanimous)	AFC 11: Takeover	September 15, 2012	3	5:00	Winnipeg, Manitoba, Canada	
Win	48–16	Joel Powell	Submission (guillotine choke)	AFC 10: Rise	June 15, 2012	2	3:25	Calgary, Alberta, Canada	
Loss	47–16	Brett Cooper	TKO (punches)	SFS 2: Doerksen vs. Cooper	October 14, 2011	1	3:55	Hamilton, Ontario, Canada	
Win	47–15	Luigi Fioravanti	Decision (unanimous)	Score Fighting Series	June 10, 2011	3	5:00	Mississauga, Ontario, Canada	
Loss	46–15	Hector Lombard	TKO (doctor stoppage)	Cage Fighting Championship 16	March 25, 2011	1	4:13	Sydney, Australia	For the CFC Middleweight Championship, fight stopped due to Doerksen's left eye being swollen shut.
Loss	46–14	Dan Miller	Decision (split)	UFC 124	December 11, 2010	3	5:00	Montreal, Quebec, Canada	
Loss	46–13	CB Dollaway	Submission (guillotine choke)	UFC 119	September 25, 2010	1	2:13	Indianapolis, Indiana, United States	
Win	46–12	Shawn Marchand	TKO (punches)	Canadian Fighting Championships 5	June 4, 2010	1	0:43	Winnipeg, Manitoba, Canada	
Win	45–12	Tom Lawlor	Submission (rear-naked choke)	UFC 113	May 8, 2010	2	2:10	Montreal, Quebec, Canada	
Win	44–12	Chad Herrick	Decision (split)	KOTC: Bad Boys II	April 16, 2010	3	5:00	Detroit, Michigan, United States	
Win	43–12	Takenori Sato	KO (punches)	World Victory Road Presents: Sengoku 10	September 23, 2009	2	4:29	Saitama, Japan	
Win	42–12	Gregory Babene	Submission (triangle choke)	Canadian Fighting Championships 2	May 22, 2009	2	1:24	Winnipeg, Manitoba, Canada	
Win	41–12	Izuru Takeuchi	TKO (punches)	World Victory Road Presents: Sengoku 6	November 1, 2008	3	4:13	Saitama, Japan	
Win	40–12	John Meyer	Decision (split)	Vipers MMA	August 29, 2008	3	5:00	Calgary, Alberta, Canada	
Loss	39–12	Jason MacDonald	TKO (elbows)	UFC 83	April 19, 2008	2	0:56	Montreal, Quebec, Canada	
Loss	39–11	Ed Herman	KO (punch)	UFC 78	November 17, 2007	3	0:39	Newark, New Jersey, United States	
Loss	39–10	Paulo Filho	TKO (punches)	WEC 29	August 5, 2007	1	4:07	Las Vegas, Nevada, United States	For the vacant WEC Middleweight Championship.
Win	39–9	BJ Lacy	TKO (punches)	GFS: Colosseum 5	May 25, 2007	2	1:11	Winnipeg, Manitoba, Canada	
Win	38–9	Dae Won Kim	Submission (triangle choke)	DEEP: 29 Impact	April 13, 2007	1	3:35	Tokyo, Japan	
Win	37–9	Ryan McGivern	Submission (rear-naked choke)	IFL: World Championship Semifinals	November 2, 2006	1	3:04	Portland, Oregon, United States	
Win	36–9	Brian Foster	Submission (rear-naked choke)	IFL: Gracie vs. Miletich	September 23, 2006	2	3:40	Moline, Illinois, United States	
Win	35–9	Todd Carney	Submission (rear-naked choke)	Extreme Challenge 67	June 30, 2006	1	2:39	Moline, Illinois, United States	
Win	34–9	Jeremy Johnson	TKO (submission to punches)	Combat in the Cage 2	May 20, 2006	1	4:30	Atlantic City, New Jersey, United States	
Win	33–9	Thomas Russell	Submission (rear-naked choke)	GFS: Colosseum of Champions	April 15, 2006	1	0:44	Winnipeg, Manitoba, Canada	
Loss	32–9	Nate Marquardt	Decision (unanimous)	UFC 58: USA vs. Canada	March 4, 2006	3	5:00	Las Vegas, Nevada, United States	
Loss	32–8	Jason MacDonald	Submission (rear-naked choke)	UCW 3: Caged Inferno	October 11, 2005	4	4:37	Winnipeg, Manitoba, Canada	
Win	32–7	Brendan Seguin	TKO (leg kicks)	King of the Cage: Firestorm	September 24, 2005	3	1:49	Calgary, Alberta, Canada	
Loss	31–7	Matt Lindland	Decision (unanimous)	UFC 54	August 20, 2005	3	5:00	Las Vegas, Nevada, United States	
Win	31–6	Art Santore	Decision (unanimous)	Freedom Fight: USA vs. Canada	July 9, 2005	3	5:00	Hull, Quebec, Canada	
Win	30–6	Patrick Côté	Submission (rear-naked choke)	UFC 52	April 16, 2005	3	2:35	Las Vegas, Nevada, United States	
Win	29–6	Matt Knaub	Submission (triangle choke)	International Fighting Championships: Eve Of Destruction	March 5, 2005	1	1:08	Salt Lake City, Utah, United States	Light Heavyweight bout.
Win	28–6	Ed Herman	Technical submission (triangle choke)	SF 7: Frightnight	October 23, 2004	3	2:12	Gresham, Oregon, United States	
Loss	27–6	Joe Riggs	TKO (submission to punches)	UFC 49	August 21, 2004	2	3:39	Las Vegas, Nevada, United States	
Win	27–5	Chris Leben	Decision (unanimous)	Freestyle Fighting Championships 9	May 14, 2004	3	5:00	Biloxi, Mississippi, United States	Return to Middleweight; won the vacant FFC Middleweight Championship.
Win	26–5	Riki Fukuda	Decision (unanimous)	SuperBrawl 35	April 16, 2004	3	5:00	Honolulu, Hawaii, United States	Light Heavyweight debut.
Win	25–5	Danny Anderson	Submission (armbar)	Extreme Challenge 56	March 26, 2004	1	3:40	Medina, Minnesota, United States	
Win	24–5	Brendan Seguin	TKO (punches)	SB 30: Collision Course	June 13, 2003	1	2:14	Honolulu, Hawaii, United States	Won the SuperBrawl 30 Middleweight Tournament.
Win	23–5	Jay Buck	KO (kick)	SB 30: Collision Course	June 13, 2003	1	0:36	Honolulu, Hawaii, United States	
Win	22–5	Desi Miner	Submission (rear-naked choke)	SB 30: Collision Course	June 13, 2003	1	2:20	Honolulu, Hawaii, United States	
Win	21–5	Kyle Jensen	Submission (kimura)	Extreme Combat	June 7, 2003	1	4:40	Minnesota, United States	
Win	20–5	Anthony Macias	TKO (punches)	Freestyle Fighting Championships 5	April 25, 2003	1	3:10	Biloxi, Mississippi, United States	
Win	19–5	Denis Kang	Submission (triangle choke)	UCC 11: The Next Level	October 11, 2002	1	4:49	Montreal, Quebec, Canada	
Win	18–5	Travis Galbraith	Submission (triangle choke)	World Freestyle Fighting 2	June 22, 2002	1	N/A	Kelowna, British Columbia, Canada	Welterweight bout.
Loss	17–5	David Loiseau	Decision (unanimous)	UCC 7: Bad Boyz	January 25, 2002	3	5:00	Montreal, Quebec, Canada	
Loss	17–4	Egan Inoue	Submission (toe hold)	SuperBrawl 22	November 2, 2001	1	0:56	Honolulu, Hawaii, United States	
Loss	17–3	Stephan Potvin	Decision (unanimous)	UCC 6: Redemption	October 19, 2001	2	5:00	Montreal, Quebec, Canada	
Win	17–2	Robbie Newman	Submission (armbar)	Extreme Challenge 44	September 15, 2001	1	1:45	Lake Charles, Louisiana, United States	
Win	16–2	Ray McDaniel	TKO (submission to punches)	Gladiators 16	June 30, 2001	1	N/A	Des Moines, Iowa, United States	
Win	15–2	Brett Al-azzawi	Submission (keylock)	UW: Ultimate Fight Minnesota	June 2, 2001	1	2:58	Bloomington, Minnesota, United States	
Win	14–2	Scott Ventimiglia	Submission (armbar)	Rings USA: Battle of Champions	March 17, 2001	1	2:33	Council Bluffs, Iowa, United States	
Win	13–2	John Alessio	Submission (rear-naked choke)	SuperBrawl: FutureBrawl 2000	November 14, 2000	2	3:48	Honolulu, Hawaii, United States	Welterweight bout.
Win	12–2	David Ferguson	Submission (armbar)	Dangerzone: Night of the Beast	October 28, 2000	1	N/A	Lynchburg, Virginia, United States	
Win	11–2	Mark Waters	Submission (rear-naked choke)	Extreme Challenge 36	August 26, 2000	1	2:34	Davenport, Iowa, United States	
Win	10–2	Adrian Serrano	Submission (keylock)	Extreme Challenge 36	August 26, 2000	1	2:17	Davenport, Iowa, United States	
Win	9–2	Mike Hueser	Submission (armbar)	Dangerzone: Battle At The Bear	July 8, 2000	1	10:51	New Town, North Dakota, United States	
Win	8–2	Lee Murray	Submission (kimura)	Extreme Challenge 34	June 17, 2000	1	1:19	Hayward, Wisconsin, United States	
Win	7–2	Mark Jaquith	Submission (armbar)	Extreme Challenge 34	June 17, 2000	1	3:54	Hayward, Wisconsin, United States	
Win	6–2	John Renken	Submission (keylock)	Ultimate Fights	February 24, 2000	1	2:24	Winnipeg, Manitoba, Canada	Return to Middleweight.
Loss	5–2	Matt Hughes	TKO (submission to knees and punches)	Extreme Challenge 29	November 13, 1999	2	0:25	Hayward, Wisconsin, United States	Welterweight debut.
Win	5–1	Cris Custer	Submission (armbar)	WEF 7: Stomp in the Swamp	October 9, 1999	1	3:17	Kenner, Louisiana, United States	
Win	4–1	Rick Graveson	Submission (kimura)	Extreme Challenge 27	August 21, 1999	1	1:14	Davenport, Iowa, United States	
Loss	3–1	Eugene Jackson	Submission (neck crank)	Bas Rutten Invitational 1	February 6, 1999	1	N/A	United States	
Win	3–0	Dennis Reed	Submission (triangle choke)	Bas Rutten Invitational 1	February 6, 1999	1	N/A	United States	
Win	2–0	Ron Lobley	Submission (rear-naked choke)	Bas Rutten Invitational 1	February 6, 1999	1	N/A	United States	
Win	1–0	Abundio Munoz	Submission (rear-naked choke)	Bas Rutten Invitational 1	February 6, 1999	1	N/A	United States	
