= Strikeforce: Destruction =

Strikeforce mixed martial arts event in 2008

- Promotion: Strikeforce
- Date: November 21, 2008
- Venue: HP Pavilion
- City: San Jose, California, United States
- Attendance: 8,152

Event chronology
Strikeforce: Payback	Strikeforce: Destruction	Strikeforce: Shamrock vs. Diaz

Strikeforce: Destruction was a mixed martial arts event held on November 21, 2008. The event was held by Strikeforce and took place at the HP Pavilion at San Jose in San Jose, California. This event aired live and free on HDNet.

== Results ==
Main card
Weight class				Method	Round	Time	Notes
Light Heavyweight	Renato Sobral	def.	Bobby Southworth (c)	TKO (doctor stoppage)	1	5:00	(Note: For the Strikeforce Light Heavyweight Championship.)
Catchweight (165 lbs)	Duane Ludwig	def.	Yves Edwards	Decision (unanimous) (29-28, 29-28, 29-28)	3	5:00
Middleweight	Scott Smith	def.	Terry Martin	KO (punch)	1	0:29
Welterweight	Joe Riggs	def.	Luke Stewart	TKO (punches)	2	2:05
Middleweight	Luke Rockhold	def.	Nik Theotikos	Submission (rear-naked choke)	1	3:06
Preliminary card
Women's Bantamweight	Kim Couture	def.	Lina Kvokov	TKO (punches)	1	3:44	(Note: Time was incorrectly announced as 1:44 after the fight. Fight ended with 1:16 left in the first round.)
Bantamweight	Darren Uyenoyama	def.	Brad Royster	Decision (unanimous)	3	5:00
Featherweight	Alvin Cacdac	def.	Jose Palacios	Submission (rear-naked choke)	2	3:10
Welterweight	Zak Bucia	def.	Adam Steel	Submission (guillotine choke)	1	0:35

== See also ==
- Strikeforce (mixed martial arts)
- List of Strikeforce champions
- List of Strikeforce events
- 2008 in Strikeforce
