= Sammy Morgan (fighter) =

American mixed martial arts fighter

Sam Morgan
- Born: Samuel Morgan; September 28, 1981 (age 45); Minneapolis, Minnesota, United States
- Other names: The Squeeze
- Nationality: American
- Height: 5 ft 10 in (1.78 m)
- Weight: 164.8 lb (74.8 kg; 11.77 st)
- Division: Middleweight; Welterweight; Lightweight
- Stance: Orthodox
- Fighting out of: Minneapolis, Minnesota, United States
- Team: Team Bison
- Years active: 2001-2008

Mixed martial arts record
- Total: 31
- Wins: 19
- By knockout: 5
- By submission: 13
- By disqualification: 1
- Losses: 12
- By knockout: 4
- By submission: 6
- By decision: 2

Other information
- Mixed martial arts record from Sherdog

Samuel Morgan (born September 28, 1981) is a retired American mixed martial artist. A professional from 2001-2008, he competed for the UFC, was a contestant on The Ultimate Fighter 2 and also fought in the Strikeforce, EliteXC, King of the Cage, and Shooto promotions.

== Background ==
Morgan wrestled at Roosevelt High School (Minneapolis) and attended Dunwoody Technical School.

== Mixed martial arts career ==
=== Early career ===
Morgan made his professional debut in 2001 and compiled a record of 16-6 with notable wins over Aaron Riley and Duane Ludwig before becoming a contestant on The Ultimate Fighter 2.

=== The Ultimate Fighter 2 ===
Morgan was picked fifth by Matt Hughes. Competing for Team Hughes, and in his only fight during the show, was defeated by Luke Cummo after being knocked out from a knee strike.

Morgan then fought at The Ultimate Fighter 2 Finale on November 5, 2005 against Josh Burkman. Morgan was knocked out 21 seconds into the fight due to a slam.

After picking up two wins in outside promotions, Morgan made his UFC return at UFC Fight Night 6 on August 17, 2006 against Forrest Petz. Morgan was defeated via unanimous decision in the biggest blowout in UFC history, with judges scores of 30–27, 30–26 and, 30–23.

=== Post-UFC ===
After leaving the UFC, Morgan picked up another win in an independent promotion before facing Cung Le at Strikeforce: Four Men Enter, One Man Survives on November 16, 2007. Morgan was defeated in the third round via TKO due to a body kick.

Morgan made his next appearance at ShoXC: Elite Challenger Series against Paul Daley and was defeated in the first round via TKO. Morgan then fought Fabrício Camões at ShoXC: Hamman vs. Suganuma 2 and was defeated via rear-naked choke submission 47 seconds into the fight.

Morgan faced Duane Ludwig at Strikeforce: Payback on October 3, 2008. Morgan lost via first-round TKO.

== Championships and accomplishments ==
- Ultimate Fighting Championship
  - UFC.com Awards
    - 2005: Ranked #6 Fight of the Year vs. Luke Cummo

== Mixed martial arts record ==
Professional record breakdown
31 matches	19 wins	12 losses
By knockout	5	4
By submission	13	6
By decision	0	2
By disqualification	1	0

Res.	Record	Opponent	Method	Event	Date	Round	Time	Location	Notes
Loss	19–12	Duane Ludwig	TKO (punches)	Strikeforce: Payback	October 3, 2008	1	2:01	Denver, Colorado, United States	Catchweight (165 lbs) bout.
Loss	19–11	Fabrício Camões	Submission (rear-naked choke)	ShoXC: Hamman vs. Suganuma 2	August 15, 2008	1	0:47	Friant, California, United States	Lightweight bout.
Loss	19–10	Paul Daley	KO (elbow)	ShoXC: Elite Challenger Series	January 25, 2008	1	2:12	Atlantic City, New Jersey, United States	
Loss	19–9	Cung Le	TKO (kick to the body)	Strikeforce: Four Men Enter, One Man Survives	November 16, 2007	3	1:58	San Jose, California, United States	Catchweight (181 lbs) bout.
Win	19–8	Sam Jackson	Submission (rear-naked choke)	EFX: Myth in Maplewood	August 2, 2007	1	N/A	Maplewood, Minnesota, United States	
Loss	18–8	Forrest Petz	Decision (unanimous)	UFC Fight Night 6	August 17, 2006	3	5:00	Las Vegas, Nevada, United States	
Win	18–7	Kenneth Allen	Submission (guillotine choke)	EFX: Fury	May 3, 2006	1	N/A	Minnesota, United States	
Win	17–7	Shannon Ritch	Submission (toe hold)	KOTC: The Return	March 19, 2006	1	1:29	San Jacinto, California, United States	Middleweight bout.
Loss	16–7	Josh Burkman	KO (slam and elbows)	The Ultimate Fighter 2 Finale	November 5, 2005	1	0:21	Las Vegas, Nevada, United States	
Win	16–6	Duane Ludwig	KO (punches)	Ring of Fire 16	April 9, 2005	1	0:52	Castle Rock, Colorado, United States	
Loss	15–6	Darin Brudigan	Submission (triangle armbar)	Ultimate Combat Sports 4	August 20, 2004	2	2:30	Wisconsin, United States	
Win	15–5	Matt Brady	Submission (armbar)	ICC: Trials 2	April 30, 2004	1	N/A	Minnesota, United States	
Loss	14–5	Akira Kikuchi	Submission (armbar)	Shooto: 3/4 in Kitazawa Town Hall	March 4, 2004	1	2:51	Tokyo, Japan	Return to Welterweight.
Loss	14–4	Manny Gamburyan	Decision (unanimous)	RSF: Shooto Challenge 2	January 2, 2004	3	5:00	Belleville, Illinois, United States	
Win	14–3	Aaron Riley	Submission (armbar)	Shooto USA: Warrior Spirit: Evolution	November 14, 2003	1	2:41	Las Vegas, Nevada, United States	
Win	13–3	Alex Gasson	Technical Submission (armbar)	ROF 9: Eruption	August 9, 2003	2	0:11	Baraboo, Wisconsin, United States	
Win	12–3	DR Williams	Submission (armbar)	IFA: Explosion	July 5, 2003	1	1:07	United States	
Win	11–3	Ryan Severson	Submission (armbar)	IFA: Clash of the Champions	May 24, 2003	1	N/A	Owatonna, Minnesota, United States	
Win	10–3	Tom Kirk	Submission (triangle choke)	ICC 2: Rebellion	April 18, 2003	1	2:58	Minneapolis, Minnesota, United States	Lightweight bout.
Win	9–3	Brad Busho	Submission (armbar)	BRB: Bar Room Brawl	March 19, 2003	1	N/A	United States	
Win	8–3	Randy Zimmerman	Submission (triangle choke)	BRB: Bar Room Brawl	March 5, 2003	1	2:08	United States	
Loss	7–3	Billy Rush	Submission (toe hold)	ICC 1: Retribution	January 12, 2003	1	1:09	Minneapolis, Minnesota, United States	
Win	7–2	Chad Rockwite	DQ (illegal spiking)	MCS 4: Minnesota Combat Sports 4	October 26, 2002	2	N/A	Duluth, Minnesota, United States	
Win	6–2	Mike Henery	KO (punch)	MCS 2: Minnesota Combat Sports 2	July 5, 2002	1	0:40	Minnesota, United States	
Win	5–2	John Henery	TKO (submission to punches)	MCS 1: Minnesota Combat Sports 1	June 7, 2002	1	N/A	Minnesota, United States	
Loss	4–2	Haythem Khalil	Submission (armbar)	UW: Amateurs	December 7, 2001	N/A	N/A	Fridley, Minnesota, United States	
Win	4–1	Joe Sheppard	TKO (punches)	UW: Ultimate Wrestling Minnesota	October 28, 2001	1	0:46	Minnesota, United States	
Win	3–1	Roger Stiner	Submission	UW: Caged Fights	September 9, 2001	1	1:18	St. Paul, Minnesota, United States	
Loss	2–1	Adrian Serrano	Submission (armbar)	UW: Caged Fights	September 9, 2001	1	0:40	St. Paul, Minnesota, United States	Middleweight bout.
Win	2–0	Andy Pond	TKO (punches)	UW: St. Paul	July 15, 2001	2	4:30	St. Paul, Minnesota, United States	
Win	1–0	Jeff Kislowski	Submission (toe hold)	UW: Ultimate Fight Minnesota	June 2, 2001	1	3:05	Bloomington, Minnesota, United States	
