= Jonathan Goulet =

Canadian mixed martial arts fighter

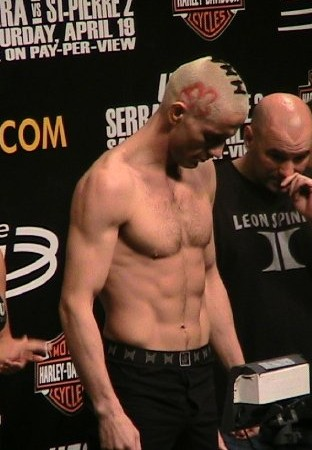
- Born: July 13, 1979 (age 47); Victoriaville, Quebec, Canada
- Other names: The Road Warrior
- Height: 6 ft 0 in (1.83 m)
- Weight: 169 lb (77 kg; 12.1 st)
- Division: Middleweight; Welterweight
- Fighting out of: Victoriaville, Quebec, Canada
- Team: Tristar Gym; Team Sityodtong
- Rank: Purple belt in Brazilian Jiu-Jitsu
- Years active: 2001—2010

Mixed martial arts record
- Total: 36
- Wins: 23
- By knockout: 12
- By submission: 8
- By decision: 3
- Losses: 12
- By knockout: 10
- By submission: 2
- No contests: 1

Other information
- Mixed martial arts record from Sherdog

Jonathan Goulet (born July 13, 1979) is a Canadian retired mixed martial artist. A professional from 2001 until 2010, Goulet fought in the UFC. He earned his nickname, "The Road Warrior," after taking a fight on very short notice, traveling to the fight venue without his trainers or cornermen. During his career he was noted for his ever-changing hair colors and using his hair to advertise sponsors.

== Background ==
Goulet is from Quebec, Canada and began training in Kenpo Karate when he was 14 years old but does not hold a high rank in the martial art. Goulet also began Brazilian jiu-jitsu when he was 20. Before becoming a professional fighter, Goulet worked in construction and also as a bouncer. It was during his time working as a bouncer at 20 years of age, when he began to pursue MMA fighting. Goulet had removed one man from the bar he was working at, but afterwards was "jumped" by four of the man's friends, who badly beat the young Goulet. After this incident, Goulet decided to make sure that nothing like that would ever happen again, and began training more in the martial arts with his first coach Steve Claveau and his team Legion.

== Mixed martial arts career ==
=== Early career ===
Goulet made his professional mixed martial arts debut in 2001 and fought almost exclusively in his home country of Canada, with notable wins over Tony Fryklund, Shonie Carter and John Alessio, before being signed by the UFC.

Jonathan began as an amateur fighter after 5 months of training and got 10 wins before he started his professional career which did start well. He fought at 205, 185 and 170 where he got 8 wins before reaching the UFC

=== Ultimate Fighting Championship ===
Taking a 13-5 MMA record to the UFC, Goulet was successful in his debut, earning a TKO victory over Jay Hieron. His second UFC fight, however, did not go his way. He was knocked out in 6.06 seconds by Duane Ludwig which remained the quickest knockout in the history of the organization until July 6, 2019.

Goulet rebounded and came back to win a majority decision over The Ultimate Fighter 2 fan favourite, Luke Cummo, at Ultimate Fight Night 5. Goulet was then submitted due to strikes by Josh Koscheck at UFC Fight Night 6 and was submitted by Dustin Hazelett at UFC Fight Night 11.

Goulet then put together back to back wins in the UFC, first submitting Paul Georgieff in December 2007, and then winning via TKO over Kuniyoshi Hironaka and UFC 83.

Goulet fought at UFC: Fight For The Troops, taking on Mike Swick, where he lost via KO in the first round.

Most recently, Goulet took on Marcus Davis at UFC 113 in Montreal, and lost in the second round via TKO. He was released from the organization after his loss to Davis along with Paul Daley and Kimbo Slice.

=== Post-UFC ===
Goulet fought Canadian prospect, Matt MacGrath at Ringside MMA 8: Invasion in Quebec, Canada on August 7, 2010. Goulet defeated MacGrath at 1:39 of the first round by TKO (punches).

Goulet faced Chris Clements on November 13, 2010 in Montreal, Quebec, Canada for the Ringside MMA Welterweight Championship. Goulet lost the fight via devastating knockout due to punches in the second round. After this fight, Goulet announced his retirement from MMA.

== Championships and accomplishments ==
- King of the Cage
  - KOTC Welterweight Championship (One time)
- Ultimate Fighting Championship
  - Fight of the Night (Two times) vs. Luke Cummo, Kuniyoshi Hironaka

== Mixed martial arts record ==
Professional record breakdown
| 36 matches | 23 wins | 12 losses |
| By knockout | 12 | 10 |
| By submission | 8 | 2 |
| By decision | 3 | 0 |
| No contests | 1 | |

| Res. | Record | Opponent | Method | Event | Date | Round | Time | Location | Notes |
|---|---|---|---|---|---|---|---|---|---|
| Loss | 23–12 (1) | Chris Clements | KO (punches) | Ringside MMA: Payback | November 12, 2010 | 2 | 1:06 | Montreal, Quebec, Canada | |
| Win | 23–11 (1) | Matt MacGrath | TKO (punches) | Ringside 8 | August 7, 2010 | 1 | 1:39 | Quebec City, Quebec, Canada | |
| Loss | 22–11 (1) | Marcus Davis | TKO (punches) | UFC 113 | May 8, 2010 | 2 | 1:23 | Montreal, Quebec, Canada | |
| Loss | 22–10 (1) | Mike Swick | KO (punches) | UFC: Fight for the Troops | December 10, 2008 | 1 | 0:33 | Fayetteville, North Carolina, United States | |
| Win | 22–9 (1) | Kuniyoshi Hironaka | TKO (punches) | UFC 83 | April 19, 2008 | 2 | 2:07 | Montreal, Quebec, Canada | Fight of the Night. |
| Win | 21–9 (1) | Paul Georgieff | Submission (rear-naked choke) | The Ultimate Fighter 6 Finale | December 8, 2007 | 1 | 4:42 | Las Vegas, Nevada, United States | |
| Win | 20–9 (1) | Dan Chambers | TKO (punches) | Xtreme MMA 2: Gold Rush | November 24, 2007 | 1 | 2:23 | Victoriaville, Quebec, Canada | |
| Loss | 19–9 (1) | Dustin Hazelett | Submission (armbar) | UFC Fight Night 11 | September 19, 2007 | 1 | 1:14 | Las Vegas, Nevada, United States | |
| Win | 19–8 (1) | Cory MacDonald | TKO (corner stoppage) | KOTC: Supremacy | July 14, 2007 | 1 | 5:00 | Halifax, Nova Scotia, Canada | Won the King of the Cage Welterweight Championship; Vacated to return to UFC |
| Loss | 18–8 (1) | Jason Day | Submission (armbar) | UCW 8: Natural Invasion | June 23, 2007 | 2 | 1:22 | Winnipeg, Manitoba, Canada | |
| Win | 18–7 (1) | Travis Axworthy | KO (head kick) | TKO 29: Repercussion | June 1, 2007 | 1 | 0:08 | Montreal, Quebec, Canada | |
| Win | 17–7 (1) | Jesse Bongfeldt | KO (punches) | TKO: MMA 2007 Tourney | March 17, 2007 | 1 | 3:52 | Victoriaville, Quebec, Canada | |
| NC | 16–7 (1) | Thomas Schulte | No Contest | TKO 28: Inevitable | February 9, 2007 | 1 | 5:00 | Montreal, Quebec, Canada | |
| Loss | 16–7 | Josh Koscheck | TKO (Submission to punches) | UFC Fight Night 6 | August 17, 2006 | 1 | 4:10 | Las Vegas, Nevada, United States | |
| Win | 16–6 | Luke Cummo | Decision (unanimous) | UFC Fight Night 5 | June 28, 2006 | 3 | 5:00 | Las Vegas, Nevada, United States | Fight of the Night. |
| Loss | 15–6 | Duane Ludwig | KO (punch) | UFC Fight Night 3 | January 16, 2006 | 1 | 0:11 | Las Vegas, Nevada, United States | |
| Win | 15–5 | Shonie Carter | Submission (bulldog choke) | TKO 23: Extreme | November 5, 2005 | 1 | 3:05 | Victoriaville, Quebec, Canada | |
| Win | 14–5 | Jay Hieron | TKO (doctor stoppage) | UFC Fight Night 2 | October 3, 2005 | 3 | 1:05 | Las Vegas, Nevada, United States | |
| Win | 13–5 | Kyle Jensen | Submission (kimura) | TKO 21: Collision | July 15, 2005 | 1 | 1:46 | Montreal, Quebec, Canada | |
| Win | 12–5 | Tony Fryklund | TKO (cut) | TKO 20: Champion vs. Champion | April 2, 2005 | 1 | 1:16 | Montreal, Quebec, Canada | |
| Win | 11–5 | John Alessio | Decision (unanimous) | TKO 18: Impact | November 26, 2004 | 3 | 5:00 | Montreal, Quebec, Canada | |
| Win | 10–5 | Joey Brown | KO (knee) | TKO 17: Revenge | September 25, 2004 | 1 | 0:07 | Victoriaville, Quebec, Canada | |
| Win | 9–5 | Travis Galbraith | Submission (rear-naked choke) | TKO 16: Infernal | May 22, 2004 | 1 | 1:21 | Quebec City, Quebec, Canada | |
| Win | 8–5 | Antoine Coutu | TKO (slam) | TKO: FutureStars | March 27, 2004 | 1 | N/A | Victoriaville, Quebec, Canada | |
| Win | 7–5 | Alex Gasson | Submission (rear-naked choke) | TKO 15: Unstoppable | February 28, 2004 | 1 | 1:43 | Montreal, Quebec, Canada | |
| Win | 6–5 | Jeff Joslin | Decision (unanimous) | TKO 14: Road Warriors | November 29, 2003 | 2 | 5:00 | Victoriaville, Quebec, Canada | |
| Loss | 5–5 | Kaipo Kalama | KO (punch) | SB 30: Collision Course | June 13, 2003 | 1 | 0:12 | Honolulu, Hawaii, United States | Middleweight Tournament Semifinal. |
| Loss | 5–4 | Brendan Seguin | TKO (punches) | Extreme Challenge 49 | February 8, 2003 | 3 | 0:46 | Davenport, Iowa, United States | |
| Win | 5–3 | Jason Rigsby | KO (kick) | Extreme Challenge 49 | February 8, 2003 | 1 | 0:22 | Davenport, Iowa, United States | |
| Win | 4–3 | Alexandre Daoust | Submission (rear-naked choke) | UCC Proving Ground 8 | November 3, 2002 | 1 | 1:00 | Victoriaville, Quebec, Canada | |
| Win | 3–3 | Aime Henripin | TKO (punches) | UCC Proving Ground 7 | September 28, 2002 | 1 | 0:28 | Victoriaville, Quebec, Canada | |
| Loss | 2–3 | Yan Pellerin | TKO (punches) | UCC Proving Ground 6 | July 21, 2002 | 1 | 3:10 | Montreal, Quebec, Canada | |
| Loss | 2–2 | Tony Fryklund | KO (punches) | UCC 8: Fast and Furious | March 30, 2002 | 1 | 3:45 | Rimouski, Quebec, Canada | |
| Win | 2–1 | Robin Dionne | Submission (armbar) | UCC Proving Ground 4 | March 9, 2002 | 1 | 1:49 | Victoriaville, Quebec, Canada | |
| Win | 1–1 | Mark Colangelo | Submission (armbar) | UCC 7: Bad Boyz | January 25, 2002 | 1 | 4:36 | Montreal, Quebec, Canada | |
| Loss | 0–1 | James Gabert | TKO (punches) | UCC Proving Ground 2 | December 16, 2001 | 1 | 4:07 | Saint-Jean-sur-Richelieu, Quebec, Canada | |
