= Terry Martin (fighter) =

American mixed martial arts fighter

- Born: October 10, 1980 (age 46); Chicago, Illinois, United States
- Other names: Dangerous
- Nationality: American
- Height: 5 ft 7 in (170 cm)
- Weight: 185 lb (84 kg; 13 st 3 lb)
- Division: Welterweight; Middleweight; Light Heavyweight
- Reach: 71 in (180 cm)
- Stance: Orthodox
- Fighting out of: Chicago, Illinois, United States
- Team: Team Dangerous, Valko BJJ <http://valkobjj.com/>
- Years active: 2003–present (MMA)

Professional boxing record
- Total: 6
- Wins: 5
- By knockout: 5
- Losses: 1
- By knockout: 1

Mixed martial arts record
- Total: 35
- Wins: 23
- By knockout: 14
- By submission: 5
- By decision: 4
- Losses: 12
- By knockout: 9
- By decision: 3

Other information
- Boxing record from BoxRec
- Mixed martial arts record from Sherdog

Terry L. Martin (born October 10, 1980) is an American mixed martial artist who most recently competed in the Middleweight division. A professional MMA competitor since 2003, he has formerly competed for the UFC, Affliction, Strikeforce, the MFC, King of the Cage, and Adrenaline MMA.

== Early life ==
Martin grew up on the West Side of Chicago, Illinois. Joining a street gang by the age of 10, Martin was nearly killed at the age of 15 in the summer of 1996, when he was caught in a drive-by shooting and hit by five bullets in his legs, chest and back. After recuperating, Martin turned his back on gang life and focused on his education, becoming the first member of his immediate family to earn his high-school diploma. Since graduating from high school, Martin has additionally attained a Bachelor of Science degree, a master's degree, and he is currently enrolled at the Adler School of Psychology's Chicago campus as a doctoral candidate. He wrestled while at Northern Illinois University. Martin has also begun to use the fame that mixed martial arts has given him to speak to inner-city children about his life and accomplishments, urging them to stay in school.

== Boxing career ==
Martin made his professional boxing debut on April 12, 2008, and defeated Ricardo Upchurch by knockout in 40 seconds. Martin won his next four bouts via knockout or technical knockout. On November 21, 2012 Martin suffered his first loss as professional boxer when he was TKOed in the third round by Dimar Ortuz.

== Mixed martial arts career ==
=== Early career ===
Martin made his professional MMA debut in 2002, a decision loss to Stephan Bonnar, before winning his next ten fights. Martin was then signed by the UFC.

=== Ultimate Fighting Championship ===
Martin made his UFC debut on August 20, 2005 at UFC 54 against former WEC Light Heavyweight Champion James Irvin. After dominating the first round of the fight, Martin was knocked out by a flying knee nine seconds into the second round.

Martin had two appearances in King of the Cage, both finishes, before returning at UFC 59 against Jason Lambert. Martin lost via second-round TKO.

Martin bounced back, winning another two fights in outside promotions before returning to face Jorge Rivera at UFC 67 in Martin's Middleweight debut. Martin knocked out Rivera 14 seconds into the first round. He then fought Ivan Salaverry at UFC 71, winning again via first-round TKO with a suplex and punches.

Martin then fought Chris Leben at UFC Fight Night 11. Martin lost via knockout late in the third round. Martin next faced Marvin Eastman at UFC 81, who defeated him via unanimous decision. After his second consecutive loss, Martin was released from the UFC.

=== Post-UFC ===
After leaving the UFC, Martin made his next big appearance at Affliction: Banned against Vitor Belfort. Martin was knocked out in the second round.

Martin next made his Strikeforce debut against Cory Devela on September 20, 2008. Martin won via third-round KO.

However, Martin would go on to lose via knockout to Scott Smith only 24 seconds into the fight at Strikeforce: Destruction.

=== Independent promotions ===
Since losing to Smith, Martin has gone 5-5 in his last ten fights.

== Championships and accomplishments ==
- Ultimate Fighting Championship
  - Knockout of the Night (One time)

== Mixed martial arts record ==
Professional record breakdown
| 35 matches | 23 wins | 12 losses |
| By knockout | 14 | 9 |
| By submission | 5 | 0 |
| By decision | 4 | 3 |

| Res. | Record | Opponent | Method | Event | Date | Round | Time | Location | Notes |
|---|---|---|---|---|---|---|---|---|---|
| Loss | 23–12 | Erick Lozano | KO (flying knee) | KOP 59 | December 16, 2017 | 1 | 2:11 | Grand Rapids, Michigan, United States | Catchweight bout of 191 lbs; Martin missed weight. |
| Win | 23–11 | Jason Ramos | Decision (majority) | MaxxFC 33 | August 19, 2017 | 5 | 5:00 | Bayamon, Puerto Rico | Won MaxxFC Middleweight Championship. |
| Loss | 22–11 | Matt Horwich | TKO (punches) | KSW XXI | December 1, 2012 | 2 | 4:08 | Warsaw, Poland | Catchweight bout of 191 lbs. |
| Win | 22–10 | Allen Hope | TKO (punches and elbows) | MFC 31: The Rundown | October 7, 2011 | 1 | 2:13 | Edmonton, Alberta, Canada | Middleweight bout. |
| Loss | 21–10 | Douglas Lima | TKO (punches) | MFC 29: Conquer | April 8, 2011 | 1 | 1:14 | Windsor, Ontario, Canada | For MFC Welterweight Championship. |
| Win | 21–9 | Josh Martin | TKO (punches) | Nemesis Fighting: MMA Global Invasion | December 11, 2010 | 1 | 1:27 | Punta Cana, Dominican Republic | |
| Win | 20–9 | Jorge Ortiz | Decision (split) | Powerhouse World Promotions: War on the Mainland | August 14, 2010 | 3 | 5:00 | Irvine, California, United States | |
| Win | 19–9 | Ted Worthington | Decision (unanimous) | KOTC: Turbulence 2 | April 24, 2010 | 3 | 5:00 | Lac du Flambeau, Wisconsin, United States | |
| Loss | 18–9 | Julio Paulino | KO (punch) | Arena Rumble II | September 12, 2009 | 3 | 3:40 | Spokane, Washington, United States | Welterweight debut. |
| Loss | 18–8 | Zak Cummings | Decision (unanimous) | XCF: Rumble in Racetown | February 14, 2009 | 3 | 5:00 | Daytona, Florida, United States | |
| Loss | 18–7 | Scott Smith | KO (punch) | Strikeforce: Destruction | November 21, 2008 | 1 | 0:24 | San Jose, California, United States | |
| Win | 18–6 | Cory Devela | KO (punch) | Strikeforce: At The Mansion II | September 20, 2008 | 3 | 2:08 | Beverly Hills, California, United States | |
| Loss | 17–6 | Vitor Belfort | KO (punch) | Affliction: Banned | July 19, 2008 | 2 | 3:12 | Anaheim, California, United States | |
| Win | 17–5 | Daiju Takase | DQ (groin kicks) | Adrenaline MMA: Guida vs Russow | June 14, 2008 | 2 | 3:35 | Chicago, Illinois, United States | |
| Loss | 16–5 | Marvin Eastman | Decision (unanimous) | UFC 81 | February 2, 2008 | 3 | 5:00 | Las Vegas, Nevada, United States | |
| Loss | 16–4 | Chris Leben | KO (punch) | UFC Fight Night 11 | September 19, 2007 | 3 | 3:56 | Las Vegas, Nevada, United States | |
| Win | 16–3 | Ivan Salaverry | TKO (suplex and punches) | UFC 71 | May 26, 2007 | 1 | 2:04 | Las Vegas, Nevada, United States | |
| Win | 15–3 | Jorge Rivera | KO (punches) | UFC 67 | February 3, 2007 | 1 | 0:14 | Las Vegas, Nevada, United States | Middleweight debut; Knockout of the Night. |
| Win | 14–3 | Jason Guida | KO (punch) | XFO 13: Operation Beatdown | November 11, 2006 | 3 | 0:08 | Hoffman Estates, Illinois, United States | |
| Win | 13–3 | Keith Berry | TKO (punches) | WEC 24: Full Force | October 12, 2006 | 1 | 2:52 | Lemoore, California, United States | |
| Loss | 12–3 | Jason Lambert | TKO (punches) | UFC 59: Reality Check | April 15, 2006 | 2 | 2:37 | Anaheim, California, United States | |
| Win | 12–2 | Trevor Garrett | KO (punch) | KOTC: Redemption on the River | February 17, 2006 | 1 | 1:40 | Moline, Illinois, United States | |
| Win | 11–2 | Ron Fields | Submission (guillotine choke) | KOTC 64: Raging Bull | December 16, 2005 | 2 | 2:37 | Cleveland, Ohio, United States | |
| Loss | 10–2 | James Irvin | KO (flying knee) | UFC 54: Boiling Point | August 20, 2005 | 2 | 0:09 | Las Vegas, Nevada, United States | |
| Win | 10–1 | Jerry Spiegel | TKO (punches) | Combat: Do Fighting Challenge 3 | May 14, 2005 | 2 | 1:55 | Illinois, United States | |
| Win | 9–1 | Homer Moore | TKO (submission to punches) | WEC 14: Vengeance | March 17, 2005 | 2 | 3:14 | Lemoore, California, United States | |
| Win | 8–1 | Jerry Spiegel | TKO (knee) | Combat: Do Fighting Challenge 2 | February 5, 2005 | 1 | 1:09 | Illinois, United States | |
| Win | 7–1 | Chael Sonnen | TKO (corner stoppage) | Xtreme Fighting Organization 4 | December 3, 2004 | 2 | 5:00 | McHenry, Illinois, United States | |
| Win | 6–1 | Jeff Gerlick | Submission (guillotine choke) | Combat: Do Fighting Challenge 1 | October 23, 2004 | 1 | 2:58 | Cicero, Illinois, United States | |
| Win | 5–1 | William Hill | KO (punches) | Xtreme Fighting Organization 3 | October 2, 2004 | 3 | 0:19 | McHenry, Illinois, United States | |
| Win | 4–1 | William Hill | KO (punches) | IHC 7: The Crucible | June 5, 2004 | 2 | 2:57 | Hammond, Indiana, United States | |
| Win | 3–1 | Greg Franklin | Submission (americana) | Extreme Challenge 54 | October 12, 2003 | 1 | 2:27 | Lakemoor, Illinois, United States | |
| Win | 2–1 | Ron Fields | Submission (rear-naked choke) | Extreme Challenge 51 | August 2, 2003 | 1 | 10:00 | St. Charles, Illinois, United States | |
| Win | 1–1 | Rob Smith | Decision | Silverback Classic 16 | June 28, 2003 | 3 | 5:00 | Canton, Illinois, United States | |
| Loss | 0–1 | Stephan Bonnar | Decision (unanimous) | Maximum Fighting Challenge | September 7, 2002 | 1 | 10:00 | Hammond, Indiana, United States | |

== Professional boxing record ==
5 Wins (5 knockouts, 0 decisions), 1 Loss
| Res. | Record | Opponent | Type | Rd., Time | Date | Location | Notes |
| Loss | 5–1 | (United States) Dimar Ortuz | TKO | 3 (6), 2:27 | November 21, 2012 | Horseshoe Casino, Hammond, Indiana, United States | Cruiserweight |
| Win | 5–0 | (United States) Thomas Boose | KO | 1 (4), N/A | November 23, 2011 | The Belvedere, Elk Grove, Illinois, United States | Heavyweight |
| Win | 4–0 | (United States) Rodelle Bolar | KO | 1 (4), 1:21 | February 20, 2010 | Horseshoe Casino, Hammond, Indiana, United States | Cruiserweight |
| Win | 3–0 | (United States) Jadell Wells | TKO | 3 (4), 2:59 | November 20, 2009 | Lumiere Casino, Saint Louis, Missouri, United States | Cruiserweight |
| Win | 2–0 | (United States) Rayvon Wilson | KO | 2 (4), 2:31 | August 21, 2009 | Horseshoe Casino, Hammond, Indiana, United States | Cruiserweight |
| Win | 1–0 | (United States) Ricardo Upchurch | KO | 1 (4), 0:47 | April 11, 2008 | The Odeum, Villa Park, Illinois, United States | Cruiserweight |

== See also ==
- List of male mixed martial artists
