= 2009 in Maximum Fighting Championship =

Information
- First date: February 20, 2009
- Last date: December 4, 2009

Events
- Total events: 4

Fights
- Total fights: 38
- Title fights: 3

Chronology
2008 in MFC	2009 in Maximum Fighting Championship	2010 in MFC

The year 2009 is the 8th year in the history of the Maximum Fighting Championship, a mixed martial arts promotion based in Canada. In 2009 Maximum Fighting Championship held 4 events beginning with, MFC 20: Destined for Greatness.

== Title fights ==
Title fights in 2009
Weight class				Method	Round	Time	Event	Notes
Welterweight	Pat Healy (c)	def.	Ryan Ford	Decision (Split)	5	5:00	MFC 20: Destined for Greatness	(Note: For the MFC Welterweight Championship)
Welterweight	Antonio McKee	def.	Derrick Noble	Decision (Unanimous)	5	5:00	MFC 20: Destined for Greatness	(Note: For the MFC Welterweight Championship)
Light Heavyweight	Trevor Prangley	def.	Emanuel Newton (c)	Decision (Unanimous)	5	5:00	MFC 21: Hard Knocks	(Note: For the MFC Light Heavyweight Championship)

== Events list ==
#	Event Title	Date	Arena	Location	Attendance
26	MFC 23: Unstoppable	December 4, 2009	River Cree Resort and Casino	Edmonton, Alberta	
25	MFC 22: Payoff	October 2, 2009	River Cree Resort and Casino	Edmonton, Alberta	
24	MFC 21: Hard Knocks	May 15, 2009	River Cree Resort and Casino	Edmonton, Alberta	
23	MFC 20: Destined for Greatness	February 20, 2009	River Cree Resort and Casino	Edmonton, Alberta	

== MFC 20: Destined for Greatness ==
MFC 20: Destined for Greatness was an event held on February 20, 2009 at the River Cree Resort and Casino in Edmonton, Alberta.

=== Results ===
Main Card
Weight class				Method	Round	Time	Notes
Welterweight	Pat Healy (c)	def.	Ryan Ford	Decision (Split)	5	5:00	(Note: For the MFC Welterweight Championship)
Welterweight	Nick Thompson	def.	Paul Daley	Decision (Unanimous)	3	5:00
Welterweight	Antonio McKee	def.	Derrick Noble	Decision (Unanimous)	5	5:00	(Note: For the MFC Welterweight Championship)
Middleweight	Bryan Baker	def.	Rory Singer	TKO (Punches)	1	4:56
Light Heavyweight	David Heath	def.	Roger Hollett	Submission (Guillotine Choke)	1	2:30
Middleweight	Solomon Hutcherson	def.	Dave Mewborn	Decision (Unanimous)	3	5:00
Lightweight	Ryan Machan	def.	Simon Marini	Submission (Rear-Naked Choke)	1	1:48
Lightweight	Evan Sanguin	def.	Alain Hernandez	TKO (Slam)	1	2:50
Lightweight	Josh Russell	def.	Donovan Foley	Submission (Triangle Choke)	1	1:00
Middleweight	Brad Zazulak	def.	Richard Symons	TKO (Punches)	1	3:54

== MFC 21: Hard Knocks ==
MFC 21: Hard Knocks was an event held on May 15, 2009 at the River Cree Resort and Casino in Edmonton, Alberta.

=== Results ===
Main Card
Weight class				Method	Round	Time	Notes
Light Heavyweight	Trevor Prangley	def.	Emanuel Newton (c)	Decision (Unanimous)	5	5:00	(Note: For the MFC Light Heavyweight Championship)
Heavyweight	Bobby Lashley	def.	Mike Cook	Technical Submission (Guillotine Choke)	1	0:24
Middleweight	Travis Galbraith	def.	David Heath	Decision (Split)	3	5:00
Welterweight	John Alessio	def.	Andrew Buckland	Submission (Rear-Naked Choke)	1	2:53
Light Heavyweight	Ryan Jimmo	def.	Mychal Clark	Decision (Unanimous)	3	5:00
Light Heavyweight	Marvin Eastman	def.	Aron Lofton	TKO (Elbows)	2	0:49
Heavyweight	William Richey	def.	Ryan Fortin	Decision (Split)	3	5:00
Light Heavyweight	Jason Heit	def.	Jeremy Combrink	Submission (Punches)	1	4:17
Light Heavyweight	Dwayne Lewis	def.	Jay Whitford	TKO (Punches)	1	0:29
Welterweight	George Belanger	def.	Nolan Clark	TKO (Punches)	1	3:40

== MFC 22: Payoff ==
MFC 22: Payoff was an event held on October 2, 2009 at the River Cree Resort and Casino in Edmonton, Alberta.

=== Results ===
Main Card
Weight class				Method	Round	Time	Notes
Middleweight	Travis Lutter	def.	Jason Macdonald	Decision (Unanimous)	3	5:00
Catchweight	Antonio McKee	def.	Carlo Prater	Decision (Unanimous)	3	5:00
Welterweight	John Alessio	def.	Luigi Fioravanti	KO (Punches)	3	1:34
Light Heavyweight	Mike Nickels	def.	David Heath	Submission (Rear-Naked Choke)	3	4:02
Light Heavyweight	Ryan Jimmo	def.	Marvin Eastman	Decision (Split)	3	5:00
Welterweight	Pete Spratt	def.	Nathan Gunn	KO (Punch)	2	4:19
	Dwayne Lewis	def.	Jared Kilkenny	TKO (Punches)	1	3:31
Light Heavyweight	Jason Heit	def.	Paapa Inkumsah	TKO (Punches)	2	4:59
Middleweight	Joe Christopher	def.	Andrew Buckland	Submission (Guillotine Choke)	1	1:54
	Nick Hrynchyshyn	def.	Jesse MacDougall	TKO (Punches)	2	4:29

== MFC 23: Unstoppable ==
MFC 23: Unstoppable was an event held on December 4, 2009 at the River Cree Resort and Casino in Edmonton, Alberta.

=== Results ===
Main Card
Weight class				Method	Round	Time	Notes
Middleweight	Thales Leites	def.	Dean Lister	Decision (Unanimous)	3	5:00
Middleweight	Jason MacDonald	def.	Emanuel Newton	Decision (Unanimous)	3	5:00	(Note: This fight was originally scored a split draw (28–28, 29–28, 28–29), but it turned out to be an error on the judges scorecard, the mistake was later fixed, and MacDonald was, in fact, awarded the victory.)
Middleweight	Bryan Baker	def.	Art Santore	Decision (Unanimous)	3	5:00
Light Heavyweight	Dwayne Lewis	def.	Marvin Eastman	KO (Punch)	1	4:58
Welterweight	Jesse Juarez	def.	Joe Christopher	Decision (Unanimous)	3	5:00
Heavyweight	Nick Penner	def.	Ryan Fortin	Submission (Rear-Naked Choke)	2	3:31
Lightweight	Ryan Machan	def.	Kajan Johnson	Submission (Rear-Naked Choke)	1	3:30
Lightweight	Billy Hua	def.	Kenny Hamilton	TKO (Punches)	2	0:20

== See also ==
- Maximum Fighting Championship
- List of Maximum Fighting Championship events
