= 2008 in Maximum Fighting Championship =

Information
- First date: February 22, 2008
- Last date: December 5, 2008

Events
- Total events: 5

Fights
- Total fights: 52
- Title fights: 2

Chronology
2007 in MFC	2008 in Maximum Fighting Championship	2009 in MFC

The year 2008 is the 7th year in the history of the Maximum Fighting Championship, a mixed martial arts promotion based in Canada. In 2008 Maximum Fighting Championship held 5 events beginning with, MFC 15: Rags to Riches.

== Title fights ==
Title fights in 2008
Weight class				Method	Round	Time	Event	Notes
Welterweight	Pat Healy	def.	Ryan Ford	Submission (Armbar)	3	3:00	MFC 17: Hostile Takeover	(Note: For the MFC Welterweight Championship)
Light Heavyweight	Emanuel Newton	def.	Roger Hollett (c)	Decision (Unanimous)	5	5:00	MFC 19: Long Time Coming	(Note: For the MFC Light Heavyweight Championship)

== Events list ==
#	Event title	Date	Arena	Location	Attendance
22	MFC 19: Long Time Coming	December 5, 2008	River Cree Resort and Casino	Edmonton, Alberta	
21	MFC 18: Famous	September 26, 2008	River Cree Resort and Casino	Edmonton, Alberta	
20	MFC 17: Hostile Takeover	July 25, 2008	River Cree Resort and Casino	Edmonton, Alberta	
19	MFC 16: Anger Management	May 9, 2008	River Cree Resort and Casino	Edmonton, Alberta	
18	MFC 15: Rags to Riches	February 22, 2008	River Cree Resort and Casino	Edmonton, Alberta	

== MFC 15: Rags to Riches ==
MFC 15: Rags to Riches was an event held on February 22, 2008 at the River Cree Resort and Casino in Edmonton, Alberta.

=== Results ===
Main Card
Weight class				Method	Round	Time	Notes
	Ryan Ford	def.	Pete Spratt	Submission (Rear Naked Choke)	2	4:01
	Jesse Forbes	def.	Chris Camozzi	Submission (Armbar)	3	1:45
	Mike Maestas	def.	Ryan Heck	Decision (Unanimous)	3	5:00
	Ryan Jimmo	def.	Craig Zellner	Submission (Rear Naked Choke)	1	3:20
	Ryan McGillivray	def.	Jason Zorthian	Submission (Armbar)	1	4:10
	Jason Kuchera	def.	Allen Hope	TKO (Punches)	2	1:11
	Gavin Neil	def.	Joshua Groves	Submission (Rear Naked Choke)	2	1:05
	Dave Nippard	def.	Carlos Espinoza	TKO (Punches)	1	0:08
	Keto Allen	def.	Doug Page	Submission (Rear-Naked Choke)	1	0:41
	Mike Tubbs	def.	Alec Pelentsov	Decision (Unanimous)	3	5:00

== MFC 16: Anger Management ==
MFC 16: Anger Management was an event held on May 9, 2008 at the River Cree Resort and Casino in Edmonton, Alberta.

=== Results ===
Main Card
Weight class				Method	Round	Time	Notes
	Ryan Ford	def.	CJ Fernandes	Submission (Rear-Naked Choke)	1	2:32
	Chase Gormley	def.	Eric Pele	Decision (Unanimous)	3	5:00
	Matt Veach	def.	Matt MacGrath	Decision (Unanimous)	3	5:00
	Benson Henderson	def.	Mike Maestas	Submission (Rear-Naked Choke)	3	4:11
	Chris Camozzi	def.	Dwayne Lewis	Decision (Unanimous)	3	5:00
	Aron Lofton	def.	Jason Kuchera	Submission (Guillotine Choke)	2	4:55
	Gavin Neil	def.	Ryan McGillivray	Decision (Split)	3	5:00
	Mike Sorenson	def.	Jeremy Martin	Submission (Guillotine Choke)	2	1:06
	Brandon Curts	def.	Sean Wright	Submission (Rear-Naked Choke)	1	4:59
	Troy Sorensen	def.	Mike Tubbs	Submission (Rear-Naked Choke)	1	0:51
	Evan Sanguin	def.	Dave Nippard	TKO (Punches)	1	2:23

== MFC 17: Hostile Takeover ==
MFC 17: Hostile Takeover was an event held on July 25, 2008 at the River Cree Resort and Casino in Edmonton, Alberta.

=== Results ===
Main Card
Weight class				Method	Round	Time	Notes
Welterweight	Pat Healy	def.	Ryan Ford	Submission (Armbar)	3	3:00	(Note: For the MFC Welterweight Championship)
Lightweight	Donald Sanchez	def.	Jason Maxwell	Submission (Triangle Choke)	2	4:03
Lightweight	Benson Henderson	def.	Ricardo Tirloni	Submission (Guillotine Choke)	2	3:49
Middleweight	Ron Faircloth	def.	Levi Avera	Submission (Rear-Naked Choke)	2	2:57
Light Heavyweight	Aron Lofton	def.	Dwayne Lewis	KO (Punch)	1	0:17
Preliminary card
Lightweight	Ryan Machan	def.	Ryan Heck	TKO (Punches)	1	4:19
Welterweight	Mike Sorenson	def.	Lemont Davis	TKO (Punches)	1	2:52
Heavyweight	Jay Whitford	def.	Jason Kuchera	Submission (Armbar)	2	4:31
Lightweight	Gavin Neil	def.	Evan Sanguin	TKO (Punches)	1	4:11
Middleweight	Elliot Duff	def.	Brandon Curts	TKO (Punches)	1	4:30
Welterweight	Jason Zorthian	def.	Jesse Clarke	Decision (Unanimous)	3	5:00

== MFC 18: Famous ==
MFC 18: Famous was an event held on September 26, 2008 at the River Cree Resort and Casino in Edmonton, Alberta.

=== Results ===
Main Card
Weight class				Method	Round	Time	Notes
Light Heavyweight	Emanuel Newton	def.	David Heath	Submission (Rear-Naked Choke)	2	4:42
Welterweight	Ryan Ford	def.	LaVerne Clark	Submission (Guillotine Choke)	2	2:30
Light Heavyweight	Jay Whitford	def.	Aron Lofton	Submission (Arm-Triangle Choke)	2	3:11
Lightweight	Simon Marini	def.	Gerald Lovato	Decision (Unanimous)	3	5:00
Lightweight	Ryan Machan	def.	Gavin Neil	Submission (Rear-Naked Choke)	1	2:47
Middleweight	Chris Camozzi	def.	Elliot Duff	Decision (Unanimous)	3	5:00
Preliminary card
Lightweight	Evan Sanguin	def.	Troy Sorensen	KO (Punch)	3	2:05
Lightweight	Josh Russell	def.	Mike Gates	Decision (Unanimous)	3	5:00
Welterweight	Jesse Clarke	def.	Jason Zorthian	TKO (Punches)	1	2:44
Welterweight	Sheldon Westcott	def.	Jeff Kilisolsky	Submission (Guillotine Choke)	1	3:33

== MFC 19: Long Time Coming ==
MFC 19: Long Time Coming was an event held on December 5, 2008 at the River Cree Resort and Casino in Edmonton, Alberta.

=== Results ===
Main Card
Weight class				Method	Round	Time	Notes
Light Heavyweight	Emanuel Newton	def.	Roger Hollett (c)	Decision (Unanimous)	5	5:00	(Note: For the MFC Light Heavyweight Championship)
Welterweight	Paul Daley	def.	John Alessio	TKO (Punches)	2	2:18
Lightweight	Derrick Noble	def.	Ariel Sexton	Submission (Guillotine Choke)	2	1:30
Middleweight	Kyle Sandford	def.	Joey Gorczynski	Decision (Split)	3	5:00
Lightweight	Ryan Machan	def.	Mike Sorenson	Submission (Rear-Naked Choke)	1	4:54
Preliminary card
Lightweight	Josh Russell	def.	Colby Snyder	Submission (Rear-Naked Choke)	1	1:44
Light Heavyweight	Aron Lofton	def.	Jason Kuchera	Submission (Guillotine Choke)	1	0:44
Lightweight	Gavin Neil	def.	Alain Hernandez	Submission (Rear-Naked Choke)	1	2:44
Welterweight	Jesse Clarke	def.	Nolan Clark	TKO (Punches)	1	4:07
Welterweight	Ryan McGillivray	def.	Elliot Duff	Submission (Heel Hook)	3	1:33

== See also ==
- Maximum Fighting Championship
- List of Maximum Fighting Championship events
