= MFC 18 =

Maximum Fighting Championship MMA event in 2008

MFC 18: Famous
- Promotion: Maximum Fighting Championship
- Date: September 26, 2008
- Venue: River Cree Resort and Casino
- City: Enoch, Alberta

Event chronology
MFC 17: Hostile Takeover	MFC 18: Famous	MFC 19: Long Time Coming

MFC 18: Famous was a mixed martial arts event held by the Maximum Fighting Championship (MFC) on September 26, 2008 in Enoch, Alberta.

== Background ==
It was announced that the winner of the David Heath and Emanuel Newton fight would receive a title shot against MFC Light Heavyweight Champion Roger Hollett. Also, the winner of the Ryan Ford and LaVerne Clark fight would receive a title shot against MFC Welterweight Champion Pat Healy.

== Fight Card ==
Main Card
Weight class				Method	Round	Time	Notes
Light Heavyweight	Emanuel Newton	def.	David Heath	Submission (Rear-Naked Choke)	2	4:42
Welterweight	Ryan Ford	def.	LaVerne Clark	Submission (Guillotine Choke)	2	2:30
Light Heavyweight	Jay Whitford	def.	Aron Lofton	Submission (Arm-Triangle Choke)	2	3:11
Lightweight	Simon Marini	def.	Gerald Lovato	Decision (Unanimous)	3	5:00
Lightweight	Ryan Machan	def.	Gavin Neil	Submission (Rear-Naked Choke)	1	2:47
Middleweight	Chris Camozzi	def.	Elliot Duff	Decision (Unanimous)	3	5:00
Preliminary card
Lightweight	Evan Sanguin	def.	Troy Sorensen	KO (Punch)	3	2:05
Lightweight	Josh Russell	def.	Mike Gates	Decision (Unanimous)	3	5:00
Welterweight	Jesse Clarke	def.	Jason Zorthian	TKO (Punches)	1	2:44
Welterweight	Sheldon Westcott	def.	Jeff Kilisolsky	Submission (Guillotine Choke)	1	3:33

== See also ==
- Maximum Fighting Championship
- List of Maximum Fighting Championship events
- 2008 in Maximum Fighting Championship
