= Dhiego Lima =

Brazilian mixed martial arts fighter

- Born: 31 January 1989 (age 37); Goiânia, Brazil
- Height: 6 ft 2 in (1.88 m)
- Weight: 170 lb (77 kg; 12 st 2 lb)
- Division: Welterweight; Middleweight
- Reach: 75 in (191 cm)
- Fighting out of: Atlanta, Georgia, United States
- Team: American Top Team Gwinnett
- Rank: Brown belt in Brazilian Jiu-Jitsu
- Years active: 2010–2022

Mixed martial arts record
- Total: 24
- Wins: 15
- By knockout: 4
- By submission: 4
- By decision: 7
- Losses: 9
- By knockout: 5
- By submission: 1
- By decision: 3

Other information
- Notable relatives: Douglas Lima brother
- Mixed martial arts record from Sherdog

Dhiego Lima (born 31 January 1989) is a Brazilian retired mixed martial artist who competed in the welterweight division of the UFC.

== Mixed martial arts career ==
Lima was born and spent his early childhood in the Brazilian city of Goiânia and began training in mixed martial arts as a teenager. He moved to the United States with his Douglas Lima, settling in Atlanta, Georgia. Lima made his professional debut in 2010 competing for regional promotions across North America, including a five fight stint with Maximum Fighting Championship. He compiled a record of 9 - 1, before auditioning for The Ultimate Fighter.

=== The Ultimate Fighter ===
In December 2013, it was announced that Lima would a cast member on The Ultimate Fighter 19, representing Team Edgar at middleweight. Over the course of the show, Lima first defeated Tim Williams in the quarterfinals via submission (rear-naked choke). In the semifinals, Lima went on to defeat Roger Zapata via submission (armbar) to reach the finals.

=== Ultimate Fighting Championship ===
Lima made his official UFC debut facing fellow castmate and Team Edgar teammate Eddie Gordon in the middleweight finals on July 6, 2014 The Ultimate Fighter 19 Finale. Lima lost the fight via knockout in the first round. Subsequently, Lima was awarded both Performance of the Season bonuses for his submission finishes during the season.

Lima was expected to face Pawel Pawlak in a welterweight bout on November 8, 2014, at UFC Fight Night 56. However, Pawlak was forced to pull out of the fight due to injury and replaced by Jorge de Oliveira. Lima won the fight via unanimous decision.

Lima faced Tim Means on February 28, 2015, at UFC 184. Means won the fight via first-round TKO.

Lima filled in as a short notice replacement against Li Jingliang on May 16, 2015, at UFC Fight Night 66, replacing Roger Zapata. He lost the fight by knockout in the first round.

On July 5, 2015, Lima confirmed his release from the UFC.

=== The Ultimate Fighter: Redemption ===
In February 2017, it was revealed that Lima would compete again on the UFC's reality show in the 25th season on The Ultimate Fighter: Redemption. Lima was the fourth pick overall for Team Dillashaw. He faced Hayder Hassan in the opening round and won by unanimous decision. He faced Gilbert Smith in the quarter-finals, winning the bout in a third round sudden death victory. Smith announced his retirement after the loss to Lima. In the semi-finals, Lima faced teammate Tom Gallicchio and won by unanimous decision to be the first fighter in the finals.

=== UFC return ===
Three years after his first stint on the show, Lima faced teammate Jesse Taylor in the finals on July 7, 2017, at The Ultimate Fighter: Redemption Finale. He lost the back-and-forth fight via rear-naked choke submission in the second round.

Lima faced Yushin Okami on April 14, 2018, at UFC on Fox 29. He lost the fight via unanimous decision.

Lima faced Chad Laprise on December 8, 2018, at UFC 231. He won the fight by knockout in the first round.

As the last fight of his The Ultimate Fighter contract, Lima faced Court McGee on April 27, 2019, at UFC Fight Night: Jacaré vs. Hermansson. He won the fight via split decision.

After the McGee fight, Lima signed a new contract with the UFC and faced Luke Jumeau on October 6, 2019, at UFC 243. He won the fight via split decision. Despite the win, Lima's manager revealed that they are going to appeal the split decision to be turned to unanimous.

Lima was scheduled to face Alex Morono on February 8, 2020, at UFC 247. However, on January 22, 2020, Lima was forced to withdraw from the bout due to a neck injury.

Lima was scheduled to face Belal Muhammad, replacing Sean Brady on December 19, 2020, at UFC Fight Night 183. However, Muhammed was diagnosed with COVID-19 during the week leading up to the event and the bout was scrapped from the card, and the bout was rescheduled to February 13, 2021, at UFC 258 Lima lost the fight via unanimous decision.

Lima faced Matt Brown on June 19, 2021, at UFC on ESPN 25. He lost the fight by knockout in the second round.

In February 2022, Lima announced his retirement from competition in MMA.

== Personal life ==
Dhiego Lima is the younger brother of the former Bellator Welterweight champion Douglas Lima. He is also owner, along with his brother Douglas Lima, of American Top Team - Team Lima in Lawrenceville, Georgia.

== Championships and accomplishments ==
Ultimate Fighting Championship

- The Ultimate Fighter 19 - Performance of the Season (Lima was awarded both Performance bonuses)
- Runner up on The Ultimate Fighter 19
- Runner up on The Ultimate Fighter: Redemption

Titan Fighting Championship

- Titan FC Welterweight Championship (One Time)

== Mixed martial arts record ==
Professional record breakdown
24 matches	15 wins	9 losses
By knockout	4	5
By submission	4	1
By decision	7	3

Res.	Record	Opponent	Method	Event	Date	Round	Time	Location	Notes
Loss	15–9	Matt Brown	KO (punch)	UFC on ESPN: The Korean Zombie vs. Ige	June 19, 2021	2	3:02	Las Vegas, Nevada, United States	
Loss	15–8	Belal Muhammad	Decision (unanimous)	UFC 258	February 13, 2021	3	5:00	Las Vegas, Nevada, United States	
Win	15–7	Luke Jumeau	Decision (split)	UFC 243	October 6, 2019	3	5:00	Melbourne, Australia	
Win	14–7	Court McGee	Decision (split)	UFC Fight Night: Jacaré vs. Hermansson	April 27, 2019	3	5:00	Sunrise, Florida, United States	
Win	13–7	Chad Laprise	KO (punch)	UFC 231	December 8, 2018	1	1:37	Toronto, Ontario, Canada	
Loss	12–7	Yushin Okami	Decision (unanimous)	UFC on Fox: Poirier vs. Gaethje	April 14, 2018	3	5:00	Glendale, Arizona, United States	
Loss	12–6	Jesse Taylor	Submission (rear-naked choke)	The Ultimate Fighter: Redemption Finale	July 7, 2017	2	0:43	Las Vegas, Nevada, United States	Lost The Ultimate Fighter 25 Welterweight Tournament.
Loss	12–5	Jason Jackson	TKO (punches)	Titan FC 42	December 2, 2016	1	2:10	Coral Gables, Florida, United States	Lost the Titan FC Welterweight Championship.
Win	12–4	David Michaud	Decision (unanimous)	Titan FC 39	June 10, 2016	5	5:00	Coral Gables, Florida, United States	Won the vacant Titan FC Welterweight Championship.
Win	11–4	Antonio Trócoli	Decision (unanimous)	Legacy FC 53	April 8, 2016	3	5:00	Atlanta, Georgia, United States	
Loss	10–4	Li Jingliang	KO (punches)	UFC Fight Night: Edgar vs. Faber	May 16, 2015	1	1:25	Pasay, Philippines	
Loss	10–3	Tim Means	TKO (punches)	UFC 184	February 28, 2015	1	2:17	Los Angeles, California, United States	
Win	10–2	Jorge de Oliveira	Decision (unanimous)	UFC Fight Night: Shogun vs. Saint Preux	November 8, 2014	3	5:00	Uberlândia, Brazil	Return to Welterweight.
Loss	9–2	Eddie Gordon	KO (punches)	The Ultimate Fighter: Team Edgar vs. Team Penn Finale	July 6, 2014	1	1:11	Las Vegas, Nevada, United States	Lost The Ultimate Fighter 19 Middleweight Tournament.
Win	9–1	Ricky Rainey	Decision (split)	XFC 25: Boiling Point	September 6, 2013	3	5:00	Albuquerque, New Mexico, United States	
Win	8–1	Roger Carroll	TKO (punches)	Wild Bill's Fight Night 53	March 16, 2013	3	3:06	Duluth, Georgia, United States	
Win	7–1	Nick Hinchliffe	Decision (unanimous)	MFC 34	August 10, 2012	3	5:00	Edmonton, Alberta, Canada	
Loss	6–1	Nathan Coy	Decision (unanimous)	MFC 32	January 27, 2012	3	5:00	Edmonton, Alberta, Canada	
Win	6–0	Jamie Toney	KO (punches)	MFC 30: Up Close & Personal	June 10, 2011	1	2:47	Edmonton, Alberta, Canada	
Win	5–0	Josh Taveirne	Submission (rear-naked choke)	MFC 29: Conquer	April 8, 2011	3	3:35	Windsor, Ontario, Canada	
Win	4–0	Bill Fraser	KO (punch)	MFC 27	November 12, 2010	2	2:36	Enoch, Alberta, Canada	Catchweight (175 lb) bout.
Win	3–0	Keon Caldwell	Submission (armbar)	Sportfight X - 3	July 10, 2010	1	4:44	Atlanta, Georgia, United States	
Win	2–0	Kenny Moss	Submission (triangle choke)	Sportfight X - 1	March 26, 2010	1	4:28	Atlanta, Georgia, United States	
Win	1–0	Steve Montgomery	Submission (triangle choke)	Fight Party	February 5, 2010	3	4:41	Greenville, South Carolina, United States	

== Mixed martial arts exhibition record ==
Exhibition record breakdown		
6 matches	6 wins	0 losses
By submission	2	0
By decision	4	0

Res.	Record	Opponent	Method	Event	Date	Round	Time	Location	Notes
Win	6–0	Tom Gallicchio	Decision (unanimous)	The Ultimate Fighter: Redemption	Jun 27, 2017 (airdate)	3	5:00	Las Vegas, Nevada, United States	TUF 25 Semifinal Round
Win	5–0	Gilbert Smith	Decision (unanimous)	The Ultimate Fighter: Redemption	Jun 14, 2017 (airdate)	3	5:00	Las Vegas, Nevada, United States	TUF 25 Quarterfinal Round
Win	4–0	Hayder Hassan	Decision (unanimous)	The Ultimate Fighter: Redemption	May 17, 2017 (airdate)	2	5:00	Las Vegas, Nevada, United States	TUF 25 Preliminary Round
Win	3–0	Roger Zapata	Submission (armbar)	The Ultimate Fighter 19	July 2, 2014 (airdate)	1	0:34	Las Vegas, Nevada, United States	TUF 19 Semifinal Round
win	2–0	Tim Williams	Submission (rear-naked choke)	The Ultimate Fighter 19	May 7, 2014 (airdate)	2	3:36	Las Vegas, Nevada, United States	TUF 19 Quarterfinal Round
Win	1–0	Adam Stroup	Decision (unanimous)	The Ultimate Fighter 19	April 16, 2014 (airdate)	2	5:00	Las Vegas, Nevada, United States	TUF 19 Elimination Round

== See also ==
- List of male mixed martial artists
