= Destined for Greatness =

Destined for Greatness may refer to:

- "Destined for Greatness", a 2020 song by Tobi and Manny Brown
- MFC 20: Destined for Greatness, a 200 mixed martial arts event
- "Destined for Greatness", see List of Power Rangers Lost Galaxy episodes
