= MFC 22 =

Maximum Fighting Championship MMA event in 2009

MFC 22: Payoff
- Promotion: Maximum Fighting Championship
- Date: October 2nd, 2009
- Venue: River Cree Resort and Casino
- City: Enoch, Alberta

Event chronology
MFC 21: Hard Knocks	MFC 22: Payoff	MFC 23: Unstoppable

MFC 22: Payoff was a mixed martial arts event held by the Maximum Fighting Championship (MFC), it was held on October 2, 2009, at the River Cree Resort and Casino in Enoch, Alberta. It featured the return of Jason MacDonald, who was competing in his first fight since being released by the UFC, against Travis Lutter, also competing in his first fight since being released by the UFC. The co-main event featured Antonio McKee defending the MFC lightweight title against Brazilian Carlo Prater. The event also featured UFC veterans Luigi Fioravanti, John Alessio, Pete Spratt, David Heath, Mike Nickels and Marvin Eastman. This event was broadcast on HDNet.

== Fight Card ==
Main Card
Weight class				Method	Round	Time	Notes
Middleweight	Travis Lutter	def.	Jason Macdonald	Decision (Unanimous)	3	5:00
Catchweight	Antonio McKee	def.	Carlo Prater	Decision (Unanimous)	3	5:00
Welterweight	John Alessio	def.	Luigi Fioravanti	KO (Punches)	3	1:34
Light Heavyweight	Mike Nickels	def.	David Heath	Submission (Rear-Naked Choke)	3	4:02
Light Heavyweight	Ryan Jimmo	def.	Marvin Eastman	Decision (Split)	3	5:00
Welterweight	Pete Spratt	def.	Nathan Gunn	KO (Punch)	2	4:19
	Dwayne Lewis	def.	Jared Kilkenny	TKO (Punches)	1	3:31
Light Heavyweight	Jason Heit	def.	Paapa Inkumsah	TKO (Punches)	2	4:59
Middleweight	Joe Christopher	def.	Andrew Buckland	Submission (Guillotine Choke)	1	1:54
	Nick Hrynchyshyn	def.	Jesse MacDougall	TKO (Punches)	2	4:29

== See also ==
- Maximum Fighting Championship
- List of Maximum Fighting Championship events
- 2009 in Maximum Fighting Championship
