= 2012 in mixed martial arts events =

The year 2012 has seen champions retain their belt, new champions crowned and new promotions begin their campaigns. As of March 30, 2012, the Ultimate Fighting Championship has held seven events with another fourteen so far reported to be held throughout the rest of the year. Bellator Fighting Championship began its sixth season containing tournaments in five different weight classes. A new Indian promotion, Super Fight League, arrived on the scene in 2012 with seven events scheduled throughout the year.

== British Association of Mixed Martial Arts ==
The British Association of Mixed Martial Arts (BAMMA) held its first 2012 event, BAMMA 9, on March 24, 2012. It was held at the National Indoor Arena in Birmingham, England. In the main event BAMMA World Middleweight Champion Tom Watson faced Jack Marshman. Watson won his title from Matt Horwich at BAMMA 3 in May, 2010, and has since defended it three twice against Alex Reid and Murilo Rua. Marshman is the reigning, and first, BAMMA British Middleweight Champion winning it at BAMMA 7 in September, 2011, after defeating Carl Noon. In this bout, Watson defended his title by defeating Jack Marshman at 4:50 of the second round by technical knockout.

== Jewels ==
Jewels, the female mixed martial arts promotion, held its first event of the year, Jewels: 18th Ring, on March 3, 2012, at the Shin-Kiba 1st Ring in Tokyo, Japan. The main event saw Mika Nagano face Emi Fujino in a lightweight (52 kilograms (115 lb)) fight consisting of two five-minute rounds using Jewels official rules. The fight went the full two rounds with Fujino earning a unanimous decision victory. Takayo Hashi and Roxanne Modafferi fought each other in the co-main event. Both ladies in the past had fought for the Strikeforce Women's Bantamweight Championship and were also past training partners. The fight was contested under Jewels special rules as a 58 kilograms (128 lb) fight of two five-minute rounds. Hashi defeated Modafferi by unanimous decision after the two rounds were completed.

Jewels next event, Jewels: 19th Ring, is expected to be held on May 26, 2012, at the Azalea Taisho Hall in Osaka, Japan. The full fight card for the event has yet to be announced, but it has been revealed that the undefeated Jewels Lightweight Queens Champion Ayaka Hamasaki will face MMA veteran and former Smackgirl champion Yuka Tsuji.

== Konfrontacja Sztuk Walki ==
On February 25, 2012, Konfrontacja Sztuk Walki (KSW) held its first event, KSW 18: Unfinished Sympathy, at the Orlen Arena in Płock, Poland. Initially, Marcin Różalski was to face Jerome Le Banner in a non-main event fight. A knee injury forced Le Banner off the card and with only two days notice Valentijn Overeem stepped in as a replacement. With the Strikeforce veteran Overeem on the card, the fight was promoted to the main event. Overeem defeated Różalski by submission with a heel hook at 2:25 of the first round. The original main event of Jan Blachowicz fighting Dave Branch changed when Branch had passport issues in the days leading up to the event. He was replaced by Mario Miranda. Blachowicz defeated Miranda by unanimous decision after three rounds of combat.

KSW 19 was held on May 12, 2012, at the Atlas Arena in Łódź, Poland. The main event featured former World's Strongest Man Mariusz Pudzianowski facing Bob Sapp who was coming off a quick loss at SFL 1. Also on the card was the first ever woman's match in KSW when Marta Chojnoska faced Paulina Suska in a 55 kilograms (121 lb) catchweight bout. The vacant KSW Middleweight Championship was given to the winner of a match between Michał Materla and Jay Silva.

KSW 20 was held on September 15, with Mariusz Pudzianowski defeating Christos Piliafas and Jan Błachowicz successfully defending the Light Heavyweight Championship against Houston Alexander.

== M-1 Global ==
The first event of 2012 for M-1 Global was M-1 Challenge 31 held on March 16, 2012, at the Ice Palace in Saint Petersburg, Russia. The event included a welterweight championship bout with Yasubey Enomoto unsuccessfully defending his title against Rashid Magomedov. Magomedov won the fight by unanimous decision. On May 17, 2012, M-1 Challenge 32 is expected to be held at the Crocus Expo arena in Moscow, Russia. The event will include a Lightweight Championship bout in which Daniel Weichel will attempt to defend his title against Yuri Ivlev.

== Maximum Fighting Championship ==
Maximum Fighting Championship started off the year with MFC 32: Bitter Rivals on January 27, 2012, at the Mayfield Inn Trade and Conference Centre in Edmonton, Alberta, Canada. The main event consisted of bout between UFC veteran Wilson Gouveia and Dwayne Lewis that was scheduled to be for five five-minute rounds. Following about a round and a half of kicks to Lewis' legs, Gouveia took Lewis down to the mat and earned a technical knockout victory at 3:19 of the second round. In the hours prior to the event Antonio McKee was stripped of his MFC Lightweight Championship after he failed to make weight. He still went on to fight Brian Cobb who was originally scheduled to fight for the championship. After three rounds of fighting, McKee defeated Cobb by unanimous decision.

MFC 33: Collision Course took place on May 4, 2012, at the Mayfield Inn Trade and Conference Centre in Edmonton, Alberta, Canada. In the main event, Nathan Coy defeated Ryan McGillivray to win the vacant MFC Welterweight Championship

MFC 34: Total Recall took place on August 10, 2012, at the Mayfield Inn Trade and Conference Centre in Edmonton, Alberta, Canada. The main event was expected to feature a rematch between Adam Lynn and Mukai Maromo for the vacant MFC Lightweight Championship. However, Lynn missed weight at the weigh in, thus relegating their five-round title fight, to a three-round non-title affair. UFC veteran Tim Hague retired after this event.

== ONE Fighting Championship ==
In its second year of existence, ONE Fighting Championship (ONE FC) has plans to hold at least eight events across Asia. Its second ever event, Battle of Heroes, on February 11, 2012, at The BritAma Arena in Jakarta, Indonesia. The event's five fight preliminary card was streamed free at the ONE FC website and through Facebook. The five fight main card was available for purchase through Ustream. The main event consisted of a lightweight fight between Ole Laursen and Felipe Enomoto. For Laursen, a former K-1 kickboxing competitor, this event would be his return to MMA fighting after more than a year due to injuries. The fight ended in a victory for Enomoto when he submitted Laursen with a rear-naked choke at 3:49 of the second round. Another fight that was highly touted by ONE FC, including one of the fighters being the center of the event poster, was a super heavyweight fight between Rolles Gracie Jr. and Bob Sapp. This fight would mark the first of a string of MMA fights in 2012 for Sapp that are scheduled to occur in quick succession. Reports suggested that Sapp would likely weigh in for this bout at 350 pounds (160 kg). The result of the fight was a loss for Sapp when he submitted to punches from Gracie at 1:18 of the first round.

On March 31, 2012, War of the Lions was held at the Singapore Indoor Stadium in Kallang, Singapore, which had sold out all 8,000 of its seats. The event was streamed in its entirety over YouTube. In the main event, Felipe Enomoto, coming off his victory at the previous ONE FC event, faced Zorobabel Moreira. Moreira, a Brazilian Jiu-Jitsu World Champion, submitted Enomoto with an armbar at 1:04 of the third round. In another fight, Ole Laursen, who was Enomoto's opponent at ONE FC's last main event, went the full three five-minute rounds with Eduard Folayang in what was reported to be an exciting match. The match ended in a split decision in favor of Laursen and resulted in calls for a rematch between the pair.

ONE FC's next event took place on June 23, 2012, at the Stadium Negara in Kuala Lumpur, Malaysia. In the main event former Strikeforce Light Heavyweight Champion Renato Sobral submitted DREAM veteran Tatsuya Mizuno in only 31 seconds. In the co-main event Zorobabel Moreira knocked out former UFC standout Roger Huerta with a vicious soccer kick late in the second round. Leandro Issa defeated longtime Japanese journeyman Masakazu Imanari and Gregor Gracie lost a close decision to Adam Kayoom.

ONE was also held on August 31, 2012, at the Smart Araneta Coliseum in Manila, Philippines. It scored a successful debut in the fight capital of Asia, Manila, with ONE FC: PRIDE OF A NATION. It was the largest event held in the Philippines and the debut of Bibiano “The Flash” Fernandes in the ONE FC cage, who dominated Gustavo Falciroli for three full rounds to take the decision.

Filipino heroes Eduard Folayang and Eric Kelly slugged and maneuvered their way to victory. Folayang made good use of his spinning back kicks and powerful right hand to control his opponent, Felipe Enomoto, earning him a unanimous decision at the end of Round 3. Kelly continued to impress fans and spectators in Manila and around the world by defeating MMA legend Jens Pulver by TKO (Punches) in Round 2.

== Super Fight League ==
Super Fight League (SFL) is a new MMA promotion based in India. It planned to hold seven events throughout India in its first year of operation. In its inaugural event, held on March 11, there was a quick battle between Bob Sapp and James Thompson during which Sapp was submitted within the opening minutes of the fight.

== Ultimate Fighting Championship ==
As of September, 2012, the UFC has held twenty-one sanctioned events in the United States, Brazil, Australia, Canada and Sweden.
