= MFC 19 =

Maximum Fighting Championship MMA event in 2008

MFC 19: Long Time Coming
- The poster for MFC 19: Long Time Coming
- Promotion: Maximum Fighting Championship
- Date: December 5, 2008
- Venue: River Cree Resort and Casino
- City: Enoch, Alberta

Event chronology
MFC 18: Famous	MFC 19: Long Time Coming	MFC 20: Destined for Greatness

MFC 19: Long Time Coming was a mixed martial arts event held by the Maximum Fighting Championship (MFC) on December 5, 2008, in Enoch, Alberta.

== Fight Card ==
Main Card
Weight class				Method	Round	Time	Notes
Light Heavyweight	Emanuel Newton	def.	Roger Hollett (c)	Decision (Unanimous)	5	5:00	(Note: For the MFC Light Heavyweight Championship)
Welterweight	Paul Daley	def.	John Alessio	TKO (Punches)	2	2:18
Lightweight	Derrick Noble	def.	Ariel Sexton	Submission (Guillotine Choke)	2	1:30
Middleweight	Kyle Sandford	def.	Joey Gorczynski	Decision (Split)	3	5:00
Lightweight	Ryan Machan	def.	Mike Sorenson	Submission (Rear-Naked Choke)	1	4:54
Preliminary card
Lightweight	Josh Russell	def.	Colby Snyder	Submission (Rear-Naked Choke)	1	1:44
Light Heavyweight	Aron Lofton	def.	Jason Kuchera	Submission (Guillotine Choke)	1	0:44
Lightweight	Gavin Neil	def.	Alain Hernandez	Submission (Rear-Naked Choke)	1	2:44
Welterweight	Jesse Clarke	def.	Nolan Clark	TKO (Punches)	1	4:07
Welterweight	Ryan McGillivray	def.	Elliot Duff	Submission (Heel Hook)	3	1:33

== See also ==
- Maximum Fighting Championship
- List of Maximum Fighting Championship events
- 2008 in Maximum Fighting Championship
