= Cory Walmsley =

American mixed martial arts fighter

- Born: St. Paul, Minnesota, United States
- Nationality: American
- Height: 6 ft 0 in (1.83 m)
- Weight: 205 lb (93 kg; 14.6 st)
- Division: Light Heavyweight
- Team: Team Bison

Mixed martial arts record
- Total: 10
- Wins: 8
- By knockout: 1
- By submission: 6
- By decision: 1
- Losses: 2
- By submission: 1
- By decision: 1

Other information
- Mixed martial arts record from Sherdog

Cory Walmsley is an American mixed martial arts fighter. He competes in the Light Heavyweight division. He lost his last fight at UFC 62 - Liddell vs Sobral against David Heath on August 26, 2006.

== Mixed martial arts record ==
Professional record breakdown
| 10 matches | 8 wins | 2 losses |
| By knockout | 1 | 0 |
| By submission | 6 | 1 |
| By decision | 1 | 1 |

| Res. | Record | Opponent | Method | Event | Date | Round | Time | Location | Notes |
|---|---|---|---|---|---|---|---|---|---|
| Loss | 8-2 | David Heath | Submission (rear naked choke) | UFC 62: Liddell vs. Sobral | August 26, 2006 | 1 | 2:32 | Nevada, United States | |
| Win | 8-1 | Karl Knothe | Submission (rear naked choke) | UCS - Throwdown at the T-Bar | July 30, 2006 | N/A | 0 | Minnesota, United States | |
| Win | 7-1 | Brandon Quigley | Submission (rear naked choke) | UCS 5 - Battle at the Barn | October 9, 2004 | 1 | | Minnesota, United States | |
| Win | 6-1 | Brandon Quigley | Submission (armbar) | UCS 4 - Ultimate Combat Sports 4 | August 20, 2004 | 1 | | Hagar, Wisconsin, United States | |
| Win | 5-1 | Adam Parochka | Submission (wrist lock) | UCS 2 - Battle at the Barn | May 1, 2004 | N/A | | Minnesota, United States | |
| Win | 4-1 | Roger Stiner | Submission (strikes) | IFA - Explosion | July 5, 2003 | 1 | 0:26 | | |
| Win | 3-1 | DR Williams | Decision | IFA - Clash of the Champions | May 24, 2003 | 3 | 3:00 | Minnesota, United States | |
| Win | 2-1 | Bill Creel | TKO | MEF 2 - Minnesota Extreme Fight 2 | April 12, 2003 | N/A | | Minnesota, United States | |
| Win | 1-1 | Bill Creel | Submission (choke) | MCS 4 - Minnesota Combat Sports 4 | October 26, 2002 | N/A | | Minnesota, United States | |
| Loss | 0-1 | Chad Rockwite | Decision | MCS 3 - Minnesota Combat Sports 3 | August 23, 2002 | 3 | 5:00 | Minnesota, United States | |
