= MFC 21 =

Maximum Fighting Championship MMA event in 2009

MFC 21: Hard Knocks
- The poster for MFC 21: Hard Knocks
- Promotion: Maximum Fighting Championship
- Date: May 15, 2009
- Venue: River Cree Resort and Casino
- City: Enoch, Alberta

Event chronology
MFC 20: Destined for Greatness	MFC 21: Hard Knocks	MFC 22: Payoff

MFC 21: Hard Knocks was a mixed martial arts event held by the Maximum Fighting Championship (MFC) on May 15, 2009, in Enoch, Alberta.

== Fight Card ==
Main Card
Weight class				Method	Round	Time	Notes
Light Heavyweight	Trevor Prangley	def.	Emanuel Newton (c)	Decision (Unanimous)	5	5:00	(Note: For the MFC Light Heavyweight Championship)
Heavyweight	Bobby Lashley	def.	Mike Cook	Technical Submission (Guillotine Choke)	1	0:24
Middleweight	Travis Galbraith	def.	David Heath	Decision (Split)	3	5:00
Welterweight	John Alessio	def.	Andrew Buckland	Submission (Rear-Naked Choke)	1	2:53
Light Heavyweight	Ryan Jimmo	def.	Mychal Clark	Decision (Unanimous)	3	5:00
Light Heavyweight	Marvin Eastman	def.	Aron Lofton	TKO (Elbows)	2	0:49
Heavyweight	William Richey	def.	Ryan Fortin	Decision (Split)	3	5:00
Light Heavyweight	Jason Heit	def.	Jeremy Combrink	Submission (Punches)	1	4:17
Light Heavyweight	Dwayne Lewis	def.	Jay Whitford	TKO (Punches)	1	0:29
Welterweight	George Belanger	def.	Nolan Clark	TKO (Punches)	1	3:40

== See also ==
- Maximum Fighting Championship
- List of Maximum Fighting Championship events
- 2009 in Maximum Fighting Championship
