= List of Maximum Fighting Championship events =

This is a list of events held and scheduled by the Maximum Fighting Championship (MFC), a mixed martial arts organization based in Canada.

The first event, MFC 1, took place on March 3, 2001. MFC 29 saw the debut of the MFC outside of Alberta, Canada.

== Past events ==
#	Event	Date	Venue	Location	Attendance
44	MFC 41: All In	October 3, 2014	Shaw Convention Centre	Edmonton, Alberta	
43	MFC 40: Crowned Kings	May 9, 2014	Shaw Convention Centre	Edmonton, Alberta	
42	MFC 39: No Remorse	January 17, 2014	Northlands Expo Centre	Edmonton, Alberta	
41	MFC 38: Behind Enemy Lines	October 4, 2013	Shaw Conference Centre	Edmonton, Alberta	
40	MFC 37: True Grit	May 10, 2013	Shaw Conference Centre	Edmonton, Alberta	
39	MFC 36: Reality Check	February 15, 2013	Mayfield Inn Trade and Conference Centre	Edmonton, Alberta	
38	MFC 35: Explosive Encounter	October 26, 2012	Mayfield Inn Trade and Conference Centre	Edmonton, Alberta	
37	MFC 34: Total Recall	August 10, 2012	Mayfield Inn Trade and Conference Centre	Edmonton, Alberta	
36	MFC 33: Collision Course	May 4, 2012	Mayfield Inn Trade and Conference Centre	Edmonton, Alberta	
35	MFC 32: Bitter Rivals	January 27, 2012	Mayfield Inn Trade and Conference Centre	Edmonton, Alberta	
34	MFC 31: The Rundown	October 7, 2011	Mayfield Inn Trade and Conference Centre	Edmonton, Alberta	
33	MFC 30: Up Close & Personal	June 10, 2011	Mayfield Inn Trade and Conference Centre	Edmonton, Alberta	
32	MFC 29: Conquer	April 8, 2011	The Colosseum at Caesars Windsor	Windsor, Ontario	
31	MFC 28: Supremacy	February 25, 2011	River Cree Resort and Casino	Edmonton, Alberta	
30	MFC 27: Breaking Point	November 12, 2010	River Cree Resort and Casino	Edmonton, Alberta	
29	MFC 26: Retribution	September 10, 2010	River Cree Resort and Casino	Edmonton, Alberta	
28	MFC 25: Vindication	May 7, 2010	Edmonton Expo Centre	Edmonton, Alberta	4,232
27	MFC 24: HeatXC	February 26, 2010	River Cree Resort and Casino	Edmonton, Alberta	
26	MFC 23: Unstoppable	December 4, 2009	River Cree Resort and Casino	Edmonton, Alberta	
25	MFC 22: Payoff	October 2, 2009	River Cree Resort and Casino	Edmonton, Alberta	
24	MFC 21: Hard Knocks	May 15, 2009	River Cree Resort and Casino	Edmonton, Alberta	
23	MFC 20: Destined for Greatness	February 20, 2009	River Cree Resort and Casino	Edmonton, Alberta	
22	MFC 19: Long Time Coming	December 5, 2008	River Cree Resort and Casino	Edmonton, Alberta	
21	MFC 18: Famous	September 26, 2008	River Cree Resort and Casino	Edmonton, Alberta	
20	MFC 17: Hostile Takeover	July 25, 2008	River Cree Resort and Casino	Edmonton, Alberta	
19	MFC 16: Anger Management	May 9, 2008	River Cree Resort and Casino	Edmonton, Alberta	
18	MFC 15: Rags to Riches	February 22, 2008	River Cree Resort and Casino	Edmonton, Alberta	
17	MFC 14: High Rollers	November 23, 2007	River Cree Resort and Casino	Edmonton, Alberta	
16	MFC 13: Lucky 13	August 24, 2007	River Cree Resort and Casino	Edmonton, Alberta	
15	MFC 12: High Stakes	June 22, 2007	River Cree Resort and Casino	Edmonton, Alberta	
14	MFC: Unplugged 3	April 20, 2007	River Cree Resort and Casino	Edmonton, Alberta	
13	MFC 11: Gridiron	February 3, 2007	Shaw Conference Centre	Edmonton, Alberta	
12	MFC: Unplugged 2	November 10, 2006	Crowne Plaza Hotel	Edmonton, Alberta	
11	MFC 10: Unfinished Business	September 8, 2006	Shaw Conference Centre	Edmonton, Alberta	
10	MFC 9: No Excuses	March 10, 2006	Shaw Conference Centre	Edmonton, Alberta	
9	MFC 8: Resurrection	September 9, 2005	Shaw Conference Centre	Edmonton, Alberta	
8	MFC 7: Undisputed	May 31, 2003	Arctic Ice Centre	Slave Lake, Alberta	
7	MFC 6: Road To Gold	February 22, 2003	Exhibition Park	Lethbridge, Alberta	
6	MFC: Unplugged	November 29, 2002	The Joint Night Club	Edmonton, Alberta	
5	MFC 5: Sweet Redemption	September 21, 2002	The AgriCom	Edmonton, Alberta	
4	MFC 4: New Groundz	June 1, 2002	Max Bell Arena	Calgary, Alberta	
3	MFC 3: Canadian Pride	March 3, 2002	N/A	Grande Prairie, Alberta	
2	MFC 2: Rumble at the Jungle	November 24, 2001	West Edmonton Mall	Edmonton, Alberta	
1	MFC 1: Maximum Fighting	March 3, 2001	N/A	Grande Prairie, Alberta	

== Event locations ==
These cities have hosted the following numbers of MFC events as of MFC: 41

- Canada (44)

Edmonton, Alberta – 38
Grande Prairie, Alberta - 2
Calgary, Alberta - 1
Lethbridge, Alberta - 1
Slave Lake, Alberta - 1
Windsor, Ontario - 1
