= Marvin Eastman =

American kickboxer and MMA fighter (born 1971)

- Born: Marvin Lee Eastman; June 8, 1971 (age 55); Merced, California, United States
- Other names: The Beastman
- Height: 1.75 m (5 ft 9 in)
- Weight: 94.1 kg (207 lb; 14.82 st)
- Division: Heavyweight; Light Heavyweight; Middleweight
- Reach: 75 in (191 cm)
- Stance: Orthodox
- Team: Master Toddy's Muay Thai Center; Lewis/Pederneiras Vale Tudo; J-Sect MMA
- Trainer: Master Toddy
- Years active: 2000–2013

Kickboxing record
- Total: 26
- Wins: 17
- By knockout: 10
- Losses: 9

Mixed martial arts record
- Total: 34
- Wins: 18
- By knockout: 7
- By submission: 1
- By decision: 10
- Losses: 15
- By knockout: 7
- By submission: 2
- By decision: 6
- Draws: 1

Other information
- University: Merced College; University of Nevada, Las Vegas
- Children: 2
- Boxing record from BoxRec
- Mixed martial arts record from Sherdog

Marvin Lee Eastman (born June 8, 1971) is an American retired professional mixed martial artist and kickboxer. A professional MMA competitor from 2000 until 2013, he competed in K-1, the Ultimate Fighting Championship (UFC), World Fighting Alliance (WFA), Maximum Fighting Championship (MFC), Shooto, and King of the Cage (KOTC), where he was Super Heavyweight Champion.

== Background ==
Marvin Eastman was born and raised in Merced, California, where he grew up wrestling and playing football. Eastman began wrestling with his older brother's junior varsity team at an early age, going on to dominate for the Merced High School wrestling team, going undefeated (42–0) in his senior year and winning the California State Wrestling Championship at the 86.6 kilogram/191-pound weight-class. Eastman then continued playing football in college for the Merced College team, where he earned All-American honors, in his two years at the school. He was then offered a full scholarship to play football for the University of Washington but ultimately decided to sign with University of Nevada, Las Vegas, where he excelled in two seasons as a running back and fullback for the Running Rebels. Eastman signed with the Calgary Stampeders of the Canadian Football League but never played in a game for them. Eastman then decided that he wanted to challenge himself in the rising world of mixed martial arts, and began training in Muay Thai.

== Career ==
Eastman made his MMA debut with King of the Cage in June 2000. He won three straight, including a win over future UFC champion Quinton "Rampage" Jackson before losing to Vernon White.

Following his loss to White, Eastman fought future UFC Middleweight Champion Rich Franklin at the World Fighting Alliance's first event, Franklin won by armbar in the first round. Eastman rebounded in the next two WFA events with wins over Alex Stiebling and Tommy Sauer. On August 17, 2002, he caused an upset by defeating four-time world champion Duke Roufus in his first foray into K-1 kickboxing on the K-1 World Grand Prix 2002 in Las Vegas undercard. Roufus was dominant for the first two rounds although Eastman did score a flash knockdown when he caught a low kick and countered with a right cross in the second. Then, in the third and final round, Eastman completed the comeback, landing two knees to Roufus' body and putting him away for good.

Eastman made his Ultimate Fighting Championship debut at UFC 43 against another future UFC Light heavyweight titlist Vitor Belfort, Belfort delivered a knee to Eastman's forehead that dropped him resulting in quite possibly the largest cut in recorded mixed martial art history, thus losing via technical knockout due to strikes in just 1 minute 7 seconds of the very first round. He then returned to King of the Cage to defeat Vernon White via unanimous decision in a rematch. He also made a return to K-1 and competed in the K-1 World Grand Prix 2004 in Las Vegas I tournament on April 30, 2004. Against Michael McDonald in the quarter-finals, he dropped the Canadian in round one but was then floored three times himself in round two to lose by TKO. In his third and final outing in the promotion, Eastman fought Ray Sefo in a non-tournament bout at the K-1 World Grand Prix 2004 in Las Vegas II on August 7, 2004. Both men traded heavy leather early on and Eastman took a time out after being poked in the eye by Sefo's toes during a high kick attempt. Immediately following the restart, Sefo swarmed on Eastman and forced the referee to call off the fight. The crowd in attendance booed the stoppage and Eastman himself protested, apparently seeing Sefo's quick attack as sucker punching. Both fighters traded verbal insults and Eastman then attacked Sefo only to be punched to the canvas. As both sets of cornermen got caught up in the ruckus, Nevada Athletic Commission officials were needed to break up the brawl.

Late in 2004, Eastman was given another shot in the UFC against Travis Lutter at UFC 50. After a fairly uneventful first round, Lutter caught Eastman with an overhand right, knocking Eastman out cold 43 seconds into the second round. Shortly after his second UFC defeat, Eastman lost a split decision to Jason Lambert at KOTC's Mortal Sin event. He then went 6–1 in smaller shows, with victories over fighters such as Jason MacDonald, Alan Belcher, and Jason Guida in a rematch.

In 2006, Eastman became the Elite Fighting Championships (EFC) Light heavyweight Champion with a majority decision win over UFC and PRIDE veteran Travis Wiuff. On July 22, 2006, the WFA reemerged with King of Streets featuring Quinton Jackson, Matt Lindland, Bas Rutten, and Lyoto Machida, among others. Eastman fought to a draw against Jorge Oliviera.

Eastman made his third appearance in the UFC at UFC 67, losing a hard-fought rematch with Quinton Jackson by knockout in the second round. Eastman won a unanimous decision over Rob Kimmons at IFO: Eastman vs. Kimmons, claiming the IFO's middleweight title. He returned to the Ultimate Fighting Championship at UFC 81 on February 2, 2008, defeating "Dangerous" Terry Martin in a dominant unanimous decision.

At The Ultimate Fighter 7 Finale, Eastman was defeated by Drew McFedries in the first round via knockout. In October 2008, Eastman lost to PRIDE and Spirit MC veteran Denis Kang by knockout 48 seconds into the opening round. Eastman was set to fight PRIDE veteran Ricardo Arona in late December but pulled out of the fight due to a knee injury suffered during training. Eastman defeated Aaron Lofton at MFC 21, winning by technical knockout. Eastman lost to Ricardo Arona by unanimous decision in the long-awaited fight at Bitetti Combat MMA 4.

A month after his loss to Arona, Eastman fought up and coming Canadian prospect Ryan Jimmo at MFC 22 on October 2. Twenty six seconds into the round, Eastman dropped and almost finished Jimmo with a straight right hand and hammer fist afterward but Jimmo weathered the storm and was able to out strike Eastman for the remainder of the round. In the second round Jimmo kept Eastman at bay with punches and kicks, midway through the second round Jimmo landed an elbow from the clinch that opened a significant gash under Eastman's left eye; the doctor checked on Eastman and let him continue. With only thirty seconds remaining in the second round Eastman was wobbled by a short uppercut from Jimmo but was able to clinch with the Canadian and survive the round. In the final round Eastman was able to land more clean strikes than he did in the first two rounds, Eastman also managed to take Jimmo down twice; seconds before the final bell Jimmo sent Eastman crashing to the mat with a stiff jab. Jimmo defeated Eastman by split decision. As a result, Eastman had lost five out of his last eight bouts.

Eastman faced former professional boxer Dwayne Lewis at MFC 23 on December 4, 2009. Lewis was the aggressor in the fight continually attacking Eastman with punch combinations to the head and body. With only two seconds left in the round, Lewis connected with an uppercut directly to the chin that sent "The Beastman" pummeling to the mat and followed up with three clean shots to the chin of an unconscious Eastman before the referee could pull him off the unconscious Eastman thus giving Lewis the KO win at 4:58 of the first round. Next he fought Steve Bossé, the only significant action in the fight took place in the 1st round where Bossé knocked Eastman down with a left hook. Eastman lost the mediocre bout by unanimous decision. Eastman had lost 8 out of his last 14 fights.

He then faced Api Hemara, winning by TKO in the third round and snapping his four fight losing streak but soon lost his next fight he was KO'd by Glover Teixeira. Eastman faced Dmitry Zabolotny at Lou Neglia's Ring of Combat XL in Atlantic City, New Jersey, on April 27, 2012, he won the fight via unanimous decision.

Making his return to Muay Thai, Eastman was initially set to fight Ricardo van den Bos for the vacant WPMF World Super Heavyweight (+95.454 kg/210.4 lb) Championship at Muaythai Superfight in Pattaya, Thailand on May 13, 2013. The event was pushed back to June 14, 2013, however, and he lost by TKO midway through the second round.

On September 28, 2013, Eastman faced Sean O'Connell at SHOWDOWN FIGHTS: XII Buchholz vs. Collard II. Eastman lost via unanimous decision.

== Personal life ==
Aside from his fighting career, Eastman also worked as a corrections officer in Las Vegas, And has a gym called Legends MMA.

== Championships and awards ==
=== Amateur wrestling ===
- California Interscholastic Federation
  - California State Wrestling −86.6 kg/191 lb Championship

=== Mixed martial arts ===
- Elite Fighting
  - Elite Fighting Light heavyweight (−92.9 kg/205 lb) Championship
- International Fighting Organization
  - IFO Middleweight (−83.9 kg/185 lb) Championship
- King of the Cage
  - KOTC Super Heavyweight (+120.2 kg/265 lb) Championship
- World Extreme Fighting
  - WEF Light heavyweight (−92.9 kg/205 lb) Championship
- World Fighting Alliance
  - WFA Light Heavyweight Championship

=== Submission grappling ===
- Grapplers Quest
  - Grapplers Quest Heavyweight (−94.8 kg/209 lb) Championship

== Kickboxing record ==
Kickboxing record
17 wins (10 KOs), 9 losses, 0 draws
Date	Result	Opponent	Event	Location	Method	Round	Time	Record
2013-05-13	Loss	(Netherlands) Ricardo van den Bos	Muaythai Superfight	Pattaya, Thailand	TKO (punches)	2	1:25	17–9
For the WPMF World Super Heavyweight (+95.454 kg/210.4 lb) Championship.
2011-11-18	Loss	(United States) Randy Blake	Xtreme Fight Night 5	Tulsa, Oklahoma, USA	KO (left high kick)	1		17–8
For the Xtreme Fight Night Light heavyweight (−92.9 kg/205 lb) Kickboxing Championship.
2004-08-07	Loss	(New Zealand) Ray Sefo	K-1 World Grand Prix 2004 in Las Vegas II	Las Vegas, Nevada, USA	TKO (punches)	1	1:32	17–7
2004-04-30	Loss	(Canada) Michael McDonald	K-1 World Grand Prix 2004 in Las Vegas I, Quarter Finals	Las Vegas, Nevada, USA	TKO (punches)	2	1:25	17–6
2002-08-17	Win	(United States) Duke Roufus	K-1 World Grand Prix 2002 in Las Vegas	Las Vegas, Nevada, USA	KO (knees to the body)	3		
Legend: Win Loss Draw/No contest Notes

== Mixed martial arts record ==
Professional record breakdown
34 matches	18 wins	15 losses
By knockout	7	7
By submission	1	2
By decision	10	6
Draws	1	

Res.	Record	Opponent	Method	Event	Date	Round	Time	Location	Notes
Loss	18–15–1	Sean O'Connell	Decision (unanimous)	SHOWDOWN FIGHTS: XII Buchholz vs. Collard II	September 28, 2013	3	5:00	Orem, Utah, United States	
Win	18–14–1	Dmitry Zabolotny	Decision (unanimous)	Ring of Combat 40	April 27, 2012	3	5:00	Atlantic City, New Jersey, United States	Heavyweight bout.
Loss	17–14–1	Glover Teixeira	KO (punch)	Shooto Brasil 25: Fight for BOPE	August 25, 2011	1	4:00	Rio de Janeiro, Brazil	
Win	17–13–1	Api Hemara	TKO (knees and punches)	Xtreme MMA 2: ANZ vs. USA	July 31, 2010	3	4:29	Sydney, Australia	
Loss	16–13–1	Steve Bossé	Decision (unanimous)	Mixed Fighting League 2: Battleground	February 27, 2010	3	5:00	Montreal, Quebec, Canada	
Loss	16–12–1	Dwayne Lewis	KO (punch)	MFC 23	December 4, 2009	1	4:58	Enoch, Alberta, Canada	
Loss	16–11–1	Ryan Jimmo	Decision (split)	MFC 22	October 2, 2009	3	5:00	Enoch, Alberta, Canada	
Loss	16–10–1	Ricardo Arona	Decision (unanimous)	Bitetti Combat 4	September 12, 2009	3	5:00	Rio de Janeiro, Brazil	
Win	16–9–1	Aaron Lofton	TKO (elbows)	MFC 21	May 15, 2009	2	0:49	Enoch, Alberta, Canada	Return to Light Heavyweight.
Loss	15–9–1	Denis Kang	TKO (punches)	Raw Combat: Redemption	October 25, 2008	1	0:48	Calgary, Alberta, Canada	
Loss	15–8–1	Drew McFedries	TKO (punches)	The Ultimate Fighter: Team Rampage vs Team Forrest Finale	June 21, 2008	1	1:08	Las Vegas, Nevada, United States	
Win	15–7–1	Terry Martin	Decision (unanimous)	UFC 81	February 2, 2008	3	5:00	Las Vegas, Nevada, United States	
Win	14–7–1	Rob Kimmons	Decision (unanimous)	IFO: Eastman vs. Kimmons	July 7, 2007	5	5:00	Las Vegas, Nevada, United States	Return to Middleweight. Won the IFO Middleweight Championship.
Loss	13–7–1	Quinton Jackson	KO (punches)	UFC 67	February 3, 2007	2	3:49	Las Vegas, Nevada, United States	
Draw	13–6–1	Jorge Oliveira	Draw	WFA: King of the Streets	July 22, 2006	3	5:00	Los Angeles, California, United States	
Win	13–6	Jason Guida	Decision (unanimous)	WEF: Orleans Arena	June 10, 2006	5	5:00	Las Vegas, Nevada, United States	
Loss	12–6	Jason Guida	Submission (guillotine choke)	World Extreme Fighting 17	April 1, 2006	3	2:07	Las Vegas, Nevada, United States	
Win	12–5	Travis Wiuff	Decision (majority)	Elite Fighting 1: Supremacy	March 18, 2006	4	5:00	Vancouver, British Columbia, Canada	Return to Light Heavyweight.
Win	11–5	Yan Pellerin	Submission (arm-triangle choke)	TKO Major League MMA 22: Lionheart	September 30, 2005	2	2:55	Montreal, Quebec, Canada	
Win	10–5	Alan Belcher	Decision (unanimous)	World Extreme Fighting 16	September 24, 2005	5	5:00	Enid, Oklahoma, United States	
Win	9–5	Antony Rea	TKO (elbow)	World Extreme Fighting: Houston	July 16, 2005	4	2:26	Houston, Texas, United States	
Win	8–5	Jason MacDonald	Decision (unanimous)	World Extreme Fighting: Sin City	May 20, 2005	3	5:00	Las Vegas, Nevada, United States	Middleweight debut.
Loss	7–5	Jason Lambert	Decision (split)	KOTC: Mortal Sins	May 7, 2005	3	5:00	Primm, Nevada, United States	
Win	7–4	Vincent Lawler	TKO (submission to punches)	Desert Heat 4	March 12, 2005	1	1:56	Phoenix, Arizona, United States	
Loss	6–4	Travis Lutter	KO (punch)	UFC 50	October 22, 2004	2	0:43	Atlantic City, New Jersey, United States	
Win	6–3	Vernon White	Decision (unanimous)	KOTC 32: Bringing Heat	January 24, 2004	3	5:00	Miami, Florida, United States	
Loss	5–3	Vitor Belfort	TKO (knees and punches)	UFC 43	June 6, 2003	1	1:07	Las Vegas, Nevada, United States	
Win	5–2	Alex Stiebling	KO (punch)	WFA 3: Level 3	November 23, 2002	1	1:07	Las Vegas, Nevada, United States	Won the WFA Light Heavyweight Championship.
Win	4–2	Tommy Sauer	TKO (elbows)	WFA 2: Level 2	July 5, 2002	2	1:35	Las Vegas, Nevada, United States	
Loss	3–2	Rich Franklin	Submission (armbar)	World Fighting Alliance 1	November 3, 2001	1	1:02	Las Vegas, Nevada, United States	
Loss	3–1	Vernon White	Decision (split)	KOTC 8: Bombs Away	April 29, 2001	3	5:00	Williams, California, United States	Light Heavyweight debut. For the inaugural KOTC Light Heavyweight Championship.
Win	3–0	Floyd Sword	Decision (split)	KOTC 7: Wet and Wild	February 24, 2001	3	5:00	San Jacinto, California, United States	
Win	2–0	Ioka Tianuu	TKO (submission to punches)	KOTC 5: Cage Wars	September 16, 2000	1	3:32	San Jacinto, California, United States	Defended the KOTC Super Heavyweight Championship.
Win	1–0	Quinton Jackson	Decision (unanimous)	KOTC 4: Gladiators	June 24, 2000	2	5:00	San Jacinto, California, United States	Won the inaugural KOTC Super Heavyweight Championship.
