= 2012 in Maximum Fighting Championship =

This is a list of Maximum Fighting Championship (MFC) events held in 2012.

== List of events ==
Maximum Fighting Championship held four events throughout 2012.

Event	Date	Venue	City
MFC 32 - Bitter Rivals	January 27, 2012	Mayfield Inn Trade and Conference Centre	Edmonton, Alberta, Canada
MFC 33 - Collision Course	May 4, 2012	Mayfield Inn Trade and Conference Centre	Edmonton, Alberta, Canada
MFC 34 - Total Recall	August 10, 2012	Mayfield Inn Trade and Conference Centre	Edmonton, Alberta, Canada
MFC 35 - Explosive Encounter	October 26, 2012	Mayfield Inn Trade and Conference Centre	Edmonton, Alberta, Canada

== Events ==
=== MFC 32 ===
MFC 32 - Bitter Rivals
- Promotion: Maximum Fighting Championship
- Date: January 27, 2012
- Venue: Mayfield Inn Trade and Conference Centre
- City: Edmonton, Alberta, Canada

Event chronology
MFC 31	MFC 32 - Bitter Rivals	MFC 33

MFC 32 - Bitter Rivals was held on January 27, 2012, at the Mayfield Inn Trade and Conference Centre in Edmonton, Alberta.

Background

Antonio McKee was stripped of his MFC Lightweight Championship after he failed to make weight. He still went on to fight Brian Cobb who was originally scheduled to fight for the championship.

The main event consisted of a non-title bout between Wilson Gouveia and Dwayne Lewis that was scheduled to be for five five-minute rounds.

Results

Main Card
Weight class				Method	Round	Time	Notes
Light Heavyweight	Wilson Gouveia	def.	Dwayne Lewis	TKO (punches)	2	3:19
Catchweight (162 lbs)	Antonio McKee	def.	Brian Cobb	Decision (unanimous)	3	5:00
Welterweight	Ryan McGillivray	def.	Diego Bautista	Submission (armbar)	3	2:25
Welterweight	Nathan Coy	def.	Dhiego Lima	Decision (unanimous)	3	5:00
Welterweight	Jamie Toney	def.	Kyle Jackson	Decision (unanimous)	3	5:00
Lightweight	Dan Ring	def.	James Haddad	Decision (majority)	3	5:00
Lightweight	Matt Jelly	def.	Garret Nybakken	Decision (split)	3	5:00
Middleweight	Brendan Kornberger	def.	Allen Hope	TKO (punches to the body)	1	4:45

=== MFC 33 ===
MFC 33 - Collision Course
- Promotion: Maximum Fighting Championship
- Date: May 4, 2012
- Venue: Mayfield Inn Trade and Conference Centre
- City: Edmonton, Alberta, Canada

Event chronology
MFC 32	MFC 33 - Collision Course	MFC 34

MFC 33 - Collision Course was held on May 4, 2012, at the Mayfield Inn Trade and Conference Centre in Edmonton, Alberta.

Background

The main event featured Ryan McGillivray and Nathan Coy fighting for the vacant MFC Welterweight Championship

Results

Main card
Weight class				Method	Round	Time	Notes
Welterweight	Nathan Coy	def.	Ryan McGillivray	TKO (doctor stoppage)	3	5:00	(Note: For vacant MFC Welterweight Championship)
Lightweight	Mukai Maromo	def.	Adam Lynn	Decision (split)	3	5:00
Middleweight	Luke Harris	def.	Edwin Dewees	Submission (guillotine choke)	1	2:05
Welterweight	Jamie Toney	def.	Andrew Buckland	Decision (unanimous)	3	5:00
Lightweight	Diego Bautista	vs.	Sabah Fadai	NC (knee to grounded fighter)	1	1:00
Middleweight	Derek Parker	Draw	Jared McComb	Draw (unanimous)	3	5:00
Lightweight	Matt Jelly	def.	Garret Nybakken	Submission (armbar)	1	2:01
Welterweight	Josh Kitchen	def.	Mike Scarcello	Submission (triangle choke)	1	2:27

=== MFC 34 ===
MFC 34 - Total Recall
- Promotion: Maximum Fighting Championship
- Date: August 10, 2012
- Venue: Mayfield Inn Trade and Conference Centre
- City: Edmonton, Alberta, Canada

Event chronology
MFC 33	MFC 34 - Total Recall	MFC 35

MFC 34 - Total Recall was held on August 10, 2012, at the Mayfield Inn Trade and Conference Centre in Edmonton, Alberta.

Background

The main event was expected to feature a rematch between Adam Lynn and Mukai Maromo for the vacant MFC Lightweight Championship. However, Lynn missed weight at the weigh in, thus relegating their five-round title fight, to a three-round non-title affair.

UFC veteran Tim Hague retired after this event.

Results

Main card
Weight class				Method	Round	Time	Notes
Catchweight (157 lbs)	Mukai Maromo	def.	Adam Lynn	KO (knee)	2	1:26
Middleweight	Joseph Henle	def.	Luke Harris	TKO (punches)	1	1:57
Heavyweight	Mike Hackert	def.	Tim Hague	TKO (punches)	1	2:27
Middleweight	Elvis Mutapčić	def.	Jacen Flynn	TKO (punches)	1	1:39
Welterweight	Dhiego Lima	def.	Nick Hinchliffe	Decision (unanimous)	3	5:00
Middleweight	Jason Zentgraf	def.	Cody Krahn	Submission (rear-naked choke)	1	1:15
Lightweight	Derek Boyle	def.	Dan Ring	TKO (punches)	1	0:20
Middleweight	Derek Parker	def.	Paul Grandbois	Submission (rear-naked choke)	1	3:24
Heavyweight	Smealinho Rama	def.	Lee Mein	TKO (punches)	1	2:49

=== MFC 35 ===
MFC 35 - Explosive Encounter
- Promotion: Maximum Fighting Championship
- Date: October 26, 2012
- Venue: Mayfield Inn Trade and Conference Centre
- City: Edmonton, Alberta, Canada

Event chronology
MFC 34	MFC 35 - Explosive Encounter	MFC 36

MFC 35 - Explosive Encounter took place on October 26, 2012, at the Mayfield Inn Trade and Conference Centre in Edmonton, Alberta.

Background

The main event saw Joseph Henle fighting Elvis Mutapčić for the vacant MFC Middleweight Championship.

Results

Main Card
Weight class				Method	Round	Time	Notes
Middleweight	Elvis Mutapčić	def.	Joseph Henle	TKO (leg kick)	3	1:45	(Note: For the vacant MFC Middleweight Championship)
Bantamweight	Graham Spencer	def.	Shane Nelson	Decision (unanimous)	3	5:00
Heavyweight	Smealinho Rama	def.	Ryan Fortin	Submission (rear naked choke)	1	2:02
Middleweight	Derek Parker	def.	Jared McComb	Decision (unanimous)	3	5:00
Welterweight	Sabah Fadai	def.	Cody Krahn	Submission (triangle choke)	1	1:24
Light Heavyweight	Paul Grandbois	def.	Jason Kuchera	TKO (punches)	2	1:43
Bantamweight	Daniel Swain	def.	Matt Jelly	Decision (unanimous)	3	5:00
Lightweight	Garret Nybakken	def.	Jesse Veltri	Submission (armbar)	1	1:24
Middleweight	Chase Degenhardt	def.	Chad Sherman	TKO (punches)	2	0:41

== Maximum Fighting Championship (2013) Events ==
Event	Date	Venue	City
MFC 36 - Reality Check	February 15, 2013	Mayfield Inn Trade and Conference Centre	Edmonton, Alberta, Canada
MFC 37 - True Grit	May 10, 2013	Mayfield Inn Trade and Conference Centre	Edmonton, Alberta, Canada
MFC 38 - Behind Enemy Lines	October 4, 2013	Mayfield Inn Trade and Conference Centre	Edmonton, Alberta, Canada

=== MFC 36 ===
MFC 36 - Reality Check
- Promotion: Maximum Fighting Championship
- Date: February 15, 2013
- Venue: Mayfield Inn Trade and Conference Centre
- City: Edmonton, Alberta, Canada

Event chronology
MFC 35	MFC 36 - Reality Check	MFC 37

MFC 36 - Reality Check took place on February 15, 2013, at the Mayfield Inn Trade and Conference Centre in Edmonton, Alberta.

Results

Main Card
Weight class				Method	Round	Time	Notes
Lightweight	Graham Spencer	def.	Mukai Maromo	Submission (north south choke)	3	1:01	(Note: For the vacant MFC Lightweight Championship)
Middleweight	Elvis Mutapčić	def.	Sam Alvey	Decision (unanimous)	5	5:00	(Note: Defended the MFC Middleweight Championship)
Heavyweight	Smealinho Rama	def.	Mike Hackert	KO (punches)	1	2:28
Lightweight	Jonatas Novaes	def.	Kurt Southern	Submission (armbar)	3	1:06
Middleweight	Jason Zentgraf	def.	Clay Davidson	Submission (armbar)	2	4:57
Middleweight	Wes Swofford	def.	Jay Silva	TKO (elbow and punches)	1	0:41
Lightweight	Garret Nybakken	def.	Keenan Feeney	Submission (guillotine choke)	1	4:45
Middleweight	Marcus Hicks	def.	Paul Grandbois	Submission (arm triangle choke)	2	2:13
Welterweight	Elvis Vukaj	def.	Chris Mattock	TKO (elbow and punches)	2	1:23

=== MFC 37 ===
MFC 37 - True Grit
- Promotion: Maximum Fighting Championship
- Date: May 10, 2013
- Venue: Mayfield Inn Trade and Conference Centre
- City: Edmonton, Alberta, Canada

Event chronology
MFC 36	MFC 37 - True Grit	MFC 38

MFC 37 - True Grit took place on May 10, 2013, at the Mayfield Inn Trade and Conference Centre in Edmonton, Alberta.

Results

Main Card
Weight class				Method	Round	Time	Notes
Bantamweight	Anthony Birchak	def.	Ryan Benoit	Decision (unanimous)	3	5:00
Middleweight	Luke Harris	def.	Jason Zentgraf	Submission (neck crank)	1	2:21
Lightweight	Kurt Southern	def.	Mukai Maromo	Submission (north south choke)	1	2:54
Middleweight	Sam Alvey	def.	Jay Silva	TKO (punches)	3	1:05
Lightweight	Peter Neufeld	def.	Garret Nybakken	Decision (unanimous)	3	5:00
Middleweight	Allen Hope	def.	Paul Grandbois	TKO (punches)	2	1:54
Middleweight	Jared McComb	def.	Marcus Hicks	Submission (rear naked choke)	1	3:09
Middleweight	Thomas Treadwell	def.	Mike Treadwell	TKO (punches)	1	2:22
Bantamweight	Maged Hammo	def.	Allan Munroe	Submission (rear naked choke)	2	2:53

=== MFC 38 ===
MFC 38 - Behind Enemy Lines
- Promotion: Maximum Fighting Championship
- Date: October 4, 2013
- Venue: Mayfield Inn Trade and Conference Centre
- City: Edmonton, Alberta, Canada

Event chronology
MFC 37	MFC 38 - Behind Enemy Lines	MFC 39

MFC 38 - Behind Enemy Lines took place on October 4, 2013, at the Mayfield Inn Trade and Conference Centre in Edmonton, Alberta.

Background

For the first time in the promotion's history, it is going to hold 3 title fights in one night.

Results

Main Card
Weight class				Method	Round	Time	Notes
Bantamweight	Anthony Birchak	def.	Tito Jones	Submission (rear naked choke)	2	3:30	(Note: For the Inaugural MFC Bantamweight Championship)
Middleweight	Sam Alvey	def.	Jason South	TKO (punches)	5	4:56	(Note: For the Vacant MFC Middleweight Championship)
Heavyweight	Anthony Hamilton	def.	Smealinho Rama	KO (head kick)	2	0:12	(Note: For the Inaugural MFC Heavyweight Championship)
Lightweight	Kurt Southern	def.	Jonatas Novaes	TKO (punches)	1	3:46
Middleweight	Teddy Ash	def.	Jared McComb	Decision (split)	3	5:00
Lightweight	Aaron Gallant	def.	Matt Jelly	TKO (punches)	1	0:07
Bantamweight	Corey Gower	def.	Daniel Mark	Decision (unanimous)	3	5:00
Lightweight	Garret Nybakken	def.	Adam Wayne	Decision (unanimous)	3	5:00
Middleweight	Cody Krahn	def.	Nick Campbell	Submission (triangle choke)	1	2:18

== Maximum Fighting Championship (2014) Events ==
Event	Date	Venue	City
MFC 39 - No Remorse	January 17, 2014	Northlands Expo Centre	Edmonton, Alberta, Canada
MFC 40 - Crowned Kings	May 9, 2014	Shaw Convention Centre	Edmonton, Alberta, Canada

=== MFC 39 ===
MFC 39 - No Remorse
- Promotion: Maximum Fighting Championship
- Date: January 17, 2014
- Venue: Northlands Expo Centre
- City: Edmonton, Alberta, Canada

Event chronology
MFC 38	MFC 39 - No Remorse	MFC 40

MFC 39 - No Remorse took place on January 17, 2014, at the Northlands Expo Centre in Edmonton, Alberta.

Results

Main Card
Weight class				Method	Round	Time	Notes
Heavyweight	Anthony Hamilton	def.	Darrill Schoonover	Decision (unanimous)	5	5:00	(Note: For the MFC Heavyweight Championship)
Lightweight	Tom Gallicchio	def.	Kurt Southern	Submission (rear naked choke)	2	4:31	(Note: Only Vacant MFC Lightweight Championship title fight for Southern, as Gallicchio missed weight by .2 lbs.)
Welterweight	Gilbert Smith	def.	Jason South	Decision (unanimous)	3	5:00
Light Heavyweight	Sean O'Connell	def.	Markhalle Wedderburn	Submission (rear naked choke)	1	1:48
Welterweight	Marcus Edwards	def.	Sean Powers	Submission (rear naked choke)	1	4:50
Lightweight	Andrew McInnis	def.	Dan Ring	Submission (rear naked choke)	2	2:01
Light Heavyweight	Jared McComb	def.	Paul Grebinski	TKO (punches)	1	2:37
Middleweight	Cody Krahn	def.	Clay Davidson	KO (slam)	1	1:04

=== MFC 40 ===
MFC 40 - Crowned Kings
- Promotion: Maximum Fighting Championship
- Date: May 9, 2014
- Venue: Shaw Convention Centre
- City: Edmonton, Alberta, Canada

Event chronology
MFC 39	MFC 40 - Crowned Kings	MFC 41

MFC 40 - Crowned Kings took place on May 9, 2014, at the Shaw Convention Centre in Edmonton, Alberta.

Results

Main Card
Weight class				Method	Round	Time	Notes
Middleweight	Sam Alvey	def.	Wes Swofford	KO (punch)	4	1:02	(Note: For the MFC Middleweight Championship)
Lightweight	Tom Gallicchio	def.	Kurt Southern	Submission (rear naked choke)	1	4:11	(Note: For the Vacant MFC Lightweight Championship)
Welterweight	Marcus Edwards	def.	Aaron Gallant	Submission (rear naked choke)	1	4:51
Light Heavyweight	Victor Valimaki	def.	Bill Widler	Submission (rear naked choke)	1	3:36
Bantamweight	Jesse Brock	def.	Kevin Croom	Decision (split)	3	5:00
Lightweight	Shane Campbell	def.	Jerrid Burke	TKO (punches)	2	0:43
Bantamweight	Corey Gower	def.	Jon Barnard	Decision (split)	3	5:00
Lightweight	Levon Kinley	def.	Cody Moorman	Submission (guillotine choke)	1	4:26
Bantamweight	Michael Hay	def.	Justin Lavertu	Technical Submission (triangle choke)	1	3:27
