= Nathan Coy =

American mixed martial arts fighter

- Born: July 24, 1978 (age 48); Portland, Oregon, United States
- Other names: Soulforce
- Nationality: American
- Height: 5 ft 10 in (1.78 m)
- Weight: 170 lb (77 kg; 12 st)
- Division: Welterweight
- Reach: 71 in (180 cm)
- Fighting out of: Coconut Creek, Florida, United States
- Team: American Top Team
- Wrestling: NCAA Division I Wrestling
- Years active: 2008–present

Mixed martial arts record
- Total: 22
- Wins: 15
- By knockout: 3
- By submission: 4
- By decision: 8
- Losses: 7
- By knockout: 2
- By submission: 3
- By decision: 2

Other information
- Mixed martial arts record from Sherdog

Nathan David Coy (born July 24, 1978) is an American mixed martial artist who most recently competed in the Welterweight division of the UFC. A professional competitor since 2008, he has also competed for Bellator, the MFC, and Strikeforce.

== Wrestling ==
A former wrestler for Oregon State University, he wrestled in the 174 pounds weight category. Nathan was an All-American and two-time Pac-10 champion and received a degree in Sociology at Oregon State University.

== Mixed martial arts career ==
In the beginning of his MMA career Coy was very successful, winning his first five fights. However, he went on to lose to future UFC fighters Brian Foster and Paul Bradley consecutively. Then posted three straight first round finishes.

=== Strikeforce ===
Coy made his debut for Strikeforce back in 2008, defeating Dave Courchaine by KO in the 1st round. In 2010, Coy returned to face Tyron Woodley at ShoMMA 8: Lindland vs. Casey, but lost by split decision.

His next fight for Strikeforce was scheduled to be against Nate Moore at ShoMMA 13: Woodley vs. Saffiedine. The fight instead took place at Strikeforce: Diaz vs. Cyborg which Coy lost via KO in the second round.

=== Maximum Fighting Championship ===
Coy made his MFC Debut on January 27, 2012 against Dhiego Lima at MFC 32, Coy won via Unanimous Decision.

Coy defeated Ultimate Fighter Alumni Ryan McGillivray on May 4, 2012 at MFC 33 via third round Doctor Stoppage to win the MFC Welterweight Championship.

=== Bellator MMA ===
Coy made his debut with Bellator MMA in September 2013 where he defeated Andy Uhrich.

In March 2014, he entered into the Bellator Season 10 Welterweight tournament. He faced Paul Bradley in the opening round on March 14, 2014 at Bellator 112 and won the fight via unanimous decision.

In the semifinals, Coy faced Adam McDonough at Bellator 116 on April 11, 2014. Coy lost via second-round KO.

Coy has since been released from the promotion.

=== The Ultimate Fighter: American Top Team vs. Blackzilians ===
Nathan Coy was confirmed as a cast member for The Ultimate Fighter 21 representing American Top Team.

=== Ultimate Fighting Championship ===
Coy faced Danny Roberts on December 10, 2015 at UFC Fight Night 80, replacing an injured Michael Graves. He lost the fight via technical submission in the first round.

Coy next faced Jonavin Webb on February 21, 2016 at UFC Fight Night 83. He won the fight via unanimous decision.

Coy faced Zak Cummings on April 15, 2017 at UFC on Fox 24. He lost the fight via technical submission due to a guillotine choke in the first round.

On February 11, 2020, news surfaced that Coy was released from the promotion.

== Personal life ==
Coy is married to his wife Cristina and has one daughter and two sons.

== Championships and accomplishments ==
- Maximum Fighting Championship
  - MFC Welterweight Championship (One time)
- SportFight MMA
  - SportFight Welterweight Championship (One time)

== Mixed martial arts record ==
Professional record breakdown
22 matches	15 wins	7 losses
By knockout	3	2
By submission	4	3
By decision	8	2

Res.	Record	Opponent	Method	Event	Date	Round	Time	Location	Notes
Loss	15–7	Zak Cummings	Technical Submission (guillotine choke)	UFC on Fox: Johnson vs. Reis	April 15, 2017	1	4:21	Kansas City, Missouri, United States	
Win	15–6	Jonavin Webb	Decision (unanimous)	UFC Fight Night: Cowboy vs. Cowboy	February 21, 2016	3	5:00	Pittsburgh, Pennsylvania, United States	
Loss	14–6	Danny Roberts	Technical Submission (triangle choke)	UFC Fight Night: Namajunas vs. VanZant	December 10, 2015	1	2:46	Las Vegas, Nevada, United States	
Loss	14–5	Adam McDonough	TKO (punch)	Bellator 116	April 11, 2014	2	0:30	Temecula, California, United States	Bellator Season 10 Welterweight Tournament Semifinal.
Win	14–4	Paul Bradley	Decision (unanimous)	Bellator 112	March 14, 2014	3	5:00	Hammond, Indiana, United States	Bellator Season 10 Welterweight Tournament Quarterfinal.
Win	13–4	Andy Uhrich	Decision (unanimous)	Bellator 101	September 27, 2013	3	5:00	Portland, Oregon, United States	
Win	12–4	Kevin Nowaczyk	Decision (unanimous)	Hoosier Fight Club 14	February 9, 2013	3	5:00	Valparaiso, Indiana, United States	
Win	11–4	Ryan McGillivray	TKO (doctor stoppage)	MFC 33	May 4, 2012	3	5:00	Edmonton, Alberta, Canada	Won the MFC Welterweight Championship.
Win	10–4	Dhiego Lima	Decision (unanimous)	MFC 32	January 27, 2012	3	5:00	Edmonton, Alberta, Canada	
Win	9–4	Patrick Mikesz	Decision (unanimous)	Warrior-1 MMA 7: Reloaded	October 15, 2011	3	5:00	Coral Gables, Florida, United States	
Loss	8–4	Nate Moore	KO (punches)	Strikeforce: Diaz vs. Cyborg	January 29, 2011	2	0:25	Nashville, Tennessee, United States	
Loss	8–3	Tyron Woodley	Decision (split)	Strikeforce Challengers: Lindland vs. Casey	May 21, 2010	3	5:00	Portland, Oregon, United States	
Win	8–2	Travis Bush	Submission (punches)	Sportfight 27: Wild Card	March 12, 2010	1	0:16	Grande Ronde, Oregon, United States	
Win	7–2	Chris Albandia	Submission (arm-triangle choke)	Raw Power MMA 1	December 10, 2009	1	3:00	Sanabis, Bahrain	
Win	6–2	JT Taylor	TKO (punches)	CageSport 6	July 25, 2009	1	3:39	Tacoma, Washington, United States	
Loss	5–2	Paul Bradley	Decision (split)	World Cagefighting Alliance: Pure Combat	February 6, 2009	3	5:00	Atlantic City, New Jersey, United States	
Loss	5–1	Brian Foster	Submission (kimura)	Pro Battle MMA: Immediate Impact	October 4, 2008	1	4:08	Springdale, Arkansas, United States	
Win	5–0	Mike Pierce	Decision (unanimous)	SportFight 23: Heated Rivals	June 20, 2008	5	5:00	Portland, Oregon, United States	Won the SportFight Welterweight Championship.
Win	4–0	Jerrod Jones	Submission (punches)	SportFight 22: Re-Awakening	April 18, 2008	2	2:37	Portland, Oregon, United States	
Win	3–0	Dave Courchaine	TKO (punches)	Strikeforce: At The Dome	February 23, 2008	1	0:46	Tacoma, Washington, United States	
Win	2–0	Rick Story	Decision (unanimous)	SportFight 21: Seasons Beatings	December 22, 2007	3	5:00	Portland, Oregon, United States	
Win	1–0	Aaron Emerson	Submission	SportFight 20: Homecoming	October 27, 2007	2	N/A	Portland, Oregon, United States	

=== Mixed martial arts exhibition record ===
Exhibition record breakdown		
2 matches	1 win	1 loss
By submission	0	1
By decision	1	0

Res.	Record	Opponent	Method	Event	Date	Round	Time	Location	Notes
Win	1–1	Valdir Araújo	Decision (unanimous)	The Ultimate Fighter 21	June 24, 2015 (airdate)	2	5:00	Boca Raton, Florida, United States	
Loss	0–1	Vicente Luque	Submission (anaconda choke)	The Ultimate Fighter 21	June 3, 2015 (airdate)	3	2:26	Boca Raton, Florida, United States	

== See also ==
- List of current mixed martial arts champions
- List of male mixed martial artists
