= Ryan Jimmo =

Canadian mixed martial arts fighter

- Jimmo c. 2010's
- Born: November 27, 1981; Saint John, New Brunswick, Canada
- Died: June 26, 2016 (aged 34); Edmonton, Alberta, Canada
- Other names: The Big Deal
- Height: 6 ft 2 in (188 cm)
- Weight: 205 lb (93 kg; 14.6 st)
- Division: Light heavyweight
- Reach: 73 in (190 cm)
- Fighting out of: Edmonton, Alberta, Canada Gilbert, Arizona, U.S.
- Team: Power MMA Team
- Rank: 2nd degree black belt in Chitō-ryū Karate
- Years active: 2007–2015 (MMA)

Mixed martial arts record
- Total: 24
- Wins: 19
- By knockout: 8
- By submission: 2
- By decision: 9
- Losses: 5
- By knockout: 2
- By submission: 1
- By decision: 2

Other information
- Mixed martial arts record from Sherdog

Ryan Jimmo (November 27, 1981 – June 26, 2016) was a Canadian mixed martial artist who competed in the light heavyweight division of the Ultimate Fighting Championship. He mostly fought in Canada and competed on the eighth season of The Ultimate Fighter. Jimmo was the former MFC Light Heavyweight Champion.

== Background ==
Jimmo was from Saint John, New Brunswick, Canada and the youngest of his four siblings. He has a background in karate, beginning the martial art from a very young age and was taught by his father, a 5th degree black belt. Jimmo's father competed in Japan twice and was placed 5th in the world in his style. Jimmo himself began competition when he was 10 years old, winning provincial and regional championships. He also competed nationally before being shown mixed martial arts. At St. Malachy's Memorial High School, Jimmo was captain of the football team and president of the chess club. He began amateur bodybuilding after breaking his leg from karate in 2004.

== Mixed martial arts career ==
=== Maximum Fighting Championship ===
Jimmo began his career in the Maximum Fighting Championship. His professional debut came at MFC 11 against former professional football player Adam Braidwood. The fight ended via TKO (punches) in the first round. Jimmo then appeared at MFC - Unplugged 3 and defeated Dwayne Lewis via unanimous decision.

After this, Jimmo appeared at MFC 14 and 15, in between three local appearances. Amassing a 5–0 record over that span with two wins by rear-naked choke and three by TKO. Ryan previously trained out of Power MMA and Fitness in Gilbert, Arizona.

=== The Ultimate Fighter ===
After compiling a 6–1 record, Jimmo successfully navigated tryouts for The Ultimate Fighter. Jimmo was selected as one of the sixteen light heavyweights in the eighth season. Jimmo's first fight, to get entry into the house was against Antwain Britt. Britt took the victory in a majority decision after two rounds. Jimmo later expressed disappointment in his performance, but did add that "Dana White said it was probably one of the better fights of the day so that’s good. The UFC already has their eye on me."

After his elimination from TUF 8, Jimmo went back to the local circuit, where he recorded three victories; one of which was over Jesse Forbes via unanimous decision.

=== Return to Maximum Fighting Championship ===
Jimmo then re-joined Maximum Fighting Championship and made his promotional debut at MFC 21 against Mychal Clark. Jimmo was untroubled throughout and took a unanimous decision with all judges scoring the bout 30–27.

Jimmo followed this up with a split decision victory over UFC veteran Marvin Eastman at MFC 22. The fight largely revolved around exchanges in the clinch. Sherdog gave the bout to Eastman, but the official result was in favor of Jimmo, with scorecards of (29–28, 28–29, and 29–28).

Jimmo's third fight in MFC was against Emanuel Newton at MFC 23. Jimmo reportedly controlled most of the bout in the clinch and took a unanimous decision victory (30–27, 29–28, and 29–28).

Jimmo's most notable fight at that point of his career was against Wilson Gouveia at MFC 25. Prior to the fight, Sherdog discussed Jimmo's position in his division and stated that "Jimmo has all the tools and an affable personality that makes him championship material. Unfortunately, though, Jimmo has failed to capitalize on numerous opportunities to cement himself in the title picture because he hasn’t been a big finisher despite a 12-fight winning streak." Sherdog also added that they didn't believe that Jimmo could "grind out another win" as Gouveia, who was making his return to the light heavyweight division, would not gas out, as he had done on occasion at middleweight in the UFC.

The fight was later made a catchweight bout of 208 lbs, after Gouveia once again came in overweight; this, despite moving up a weight class originally. Jimmo used various striking techniques to control his opponent and dropped Gouveia on a few occasions. Jimmo walked away with a unanimous decision (30–27, 30–26, and 30–26). Jimmo attributed the victory to Gouveia gassing out after his difficulty with making weight.

Jimmo was then scheduled to fight for the Maximum Fighting Championship's Light Heavyweight title against newcomer Glover Teixeira, but Jimmo questioned why he had been made to work for a title shot, while Teixeira, "a relative unknown" received a shot immediately. MFC then placed Bobby Southworth into the title bout, though Southworth would later withdraw from the fight due to personal problems.

Jimmo defeated fellow Canadian, Dwayne Lewis at MFC 28 on February 25, 2011, to win the vacant MFC Light Heavyweight Championship.

Jimmo was expected to face former MFC Light-Heavyweight champion Emanuel Newton at MFC 29 on April 8. However, he took on replacement Zak Cummings and won the fight via unanimous decision.

Jimmo defended his title against Rameau Thierry Sokoudjou at MFC 31, winning a controversial unanimous decision.

=== Ultimate Fighting Championship ===
Jimmo was expected to make his promotional debut against Karlos Vemola on January 20, 2012, at UFC on FX 1. However, Jimmo was forced from the bout with an injury.

Jimmo faced Anthony Perosh on July 21, 2012, at UFC 149. Jimmo won the fight via knockout in seven seconds, making it tied for the third fastest knockout in UFC history. This fight earned him a Knockout of the Night award.

For his second fight with the promotion, Jimmo faced James Te Huna on February 16, 2013, at UFC on Fuel TV: Barão vs. McDonald. He had a successful first round as Jimmo dropped Te-Huna with a head kick. However, Te-Huna then rebounded by controlling the second and third rounds with his striking and wrestling, resulting in a unanimous decision loss for Jimmo.

Jimmo next fought Igor Pokrajac at UFC 161 on June 15, 2013. Jimmo won the fight via unanimous decision.

Jimmo faced Jimi Manuwa on October 26, 2013, at UFC Fight Night 30. He lost the fight via TKO in the second round due to a leg injury.

Jimmo was expected to face UFC newcomer Steve Bossé at The Ultimate Fighter Nations Finale on April 16, 2014, in Quebec City. However, Bossé was forced to pull out of the bout citing an injury. Jimmo instead faced UFC newcomer Sean O'Connell. He won the fight via knockout in the first round. The win also earned Jimmo his first Performance of the Night bonus award.

Jimmo faced Ovince St. Preux on June 14, 2014, at UFC 174. He lost the fight via submission in the second round.

Jimmo faced Francimar Barroso on May 30, 2015, at UFC Fight Night 67. He lost the fight via unanimous decision. Subsequently, he was released from the UFC for speaking out against the promotion and the Reebok deal.

== Death ==
Jimmo was involved in a parking lot altercation early in the morning of June 26, 2016, in Edmonton, Alberta, Canada. He argued with the driver of a truck, and as Jimmo was walking away, the driver ran him over and left the scene. Jimmo later died in the hospital from his injuries.

Two men were charged following the incident. Anthony Getschel, 23, was charged with second-degree murder, criminal negligence causing death, dangerous operation of a motor vehicle causing death, and failing to stop at the scene of an accident involving death. Jordan Wagner, 21, was charged with being an accessory after the fact to murder.

Eventually on November 26, 2018, Getschel pleaded guilty to manslaughter and hit and run, and he was sentenced to eight years in prison in a Canadian courthouse on December 3, 2018.

== Championships and accomplishments ==
- Ultimate Fighting Championship
  - Knockout of the Night (One time) vs. Anthony Perosh
  - Performance of the Night (One time) vs. Sean O'Connell
  - Tied (Todd Duffee, Jung Chan-Sung & Terrance McKinney) for the third fastest knockout in UFC history (7 seconds)
  - UFC.com Awards
    - 2012: Ranked #9 Newcomer of the Year & Ranked #6 Knockout of the Year vs. Anthony Perosh
- Maximum Fighting Championship
  - MFC Light Heavyweight Championship (one time)
  - Most Consecutive Title Defenses (two)
  - Most fights in MFC history (eleven)

== Mixed martial arts record ==
Professional record breakdown
24 matches	19 wins	5 losses
By knockout	8	2
By submission	2	1
By decision	9	2

Res.	Record	Opponent	Method	Event	Date	Round	Time	Location	Notes
Loss	19–5	Francimar Barroso	Decision (unanimous)	UFC Fight Night: Condit vs. Alves	May 30, 2015	3	5:00	Goiânia, Brazil	
Loss	19–4	Ovince Saint Preux	Submission (kimura)	UFC 174	June 14, 2014	2	2:10	Vancouver, British Columbia, Canada	
Win	19–3	Sean O'Connell	KO (punches)	The Ultimate Fighter Nations Finale: Bisping vs. Kennedy	April 16, 2014	1	4:27	Quebec City, Quebec, Canada	Performance of the Night.
Loss	18–3	Jimi Manuwa	TKO (leg injury)	UFC Fight Night: Machida vs. Munoz	October 26, 2013	2	4:41	Manchester, England, United Kingdom	
Win	18–2	Igor Pokrajac	Decision (unanimous)	UFC 161	June 15, 2013	3	5:00	Winnipeg, Manitoba, Canada	
Loss	17–2	James Te Huna	Decision (unanimous)	UFC on Fuel TV: Barão vs. McDonald	February 16, 2013	3	5:00	London, England, United Kingdom	
Win	17–1	Anthony Perosh	KO (punch)	UFC 149	July 21, 2012	1	0:07	Calgary, Alberta, Canada	Knockout of the Night.
Win	16–1	Rameau Sokoudjou	Decision (unanimous)	MFC 31: The Rundown	October 7, 2011	5	5:00	Edmonton, Alberta, Canada	Defended MFC Light Heavyweight Championship.
Win	15–1	Zak Cummings	Decision (unanimous)	MFC 29: Conquer	April 8, 2011	5	5:00	Windsor, Ontario, Canada	Defended MFC Light Heavyweight Championship.
Win	14–1	Dwayne Lewis	TKO (doctor stoppage)	MFC 28: Supremacy	February 25, 2011	3	3:13	Edmonton, Alberta, Canada	Won vacant MFC Light Heavyweight Championship.
Win	13–1	Wilson Gouveia	Decision (unanimous)	MFC 25	May 7, 2010	3	5:00	Edmonton, Alberta, Canada	
Win	12–1	Emanuel Newton	Decision (unanimous)	MFC 23	December 4, 2009	3	5:00	Edmonton, Alberta, Canada	
Win	11–1	Marvin Eastman	Decision (split)	MFC 22	October 2, 2009	3	5:00	Edmonton, Alberta, Canada	
Win	10–1	Mychal Clark	Decision (unanimous)	MFC 21	May 15, 2009	3	5:00	Enoch, Alberta, Canada	
Win	9–1	Rick Roufus	TKO (punches)	PFP: Wanted	November 29, 2008	1	2:24	Dartmouth, Nova Scotia, Canada	
Win	8–1	Jesse Forbes	Decision (unanimous)	XMMA 6: House of Pain	November 6, 2008	3	5:00	Montreal, Quebec, Canada	
Win	7–1	Chris Fontaine	TKO (punches)	X: Fight	October 4, 2008	1	4:39	Moncton, New Brunswick, Canada	
Win	6–1	Jeff Lundburg	TKO (punches)	ECC 7: Bad Blood	March 15, 2008	1	1:31	Halifax, Nova Scotia, Canada	
Win	5–1	Craig Zellner	Submission (rear-naked choke)	MFC 15: Rags to Riches	February 22, 2008	1	3:20	Edmonton, Alberta, Canada	
Win	4–1	Samir Seif	TKO (punches)	PFP: New Year's Restitution	January 13, 2008	1	4:33	Halifax, Nova Scotia, Canada	
Win	3–1	Nick Goetz	Submission (rear-naked choke)	MFC 14: High Rollers	November 23, 2007	1	0:44	Edmonton, Alberta, Canada	
Win	2–1	Matt Acorn	TKO (punches)	ECC 6: Hometown Heroes	October 20, 2007	1	2:30	Halifax, Nova Scotia, Canada	
Win	1–1	Dwayne Lewis	Decision (unanimous)	MFC: Unplugged 3	April 20, 2007	3	5:00	Edmonton, Alberta, Canada	
Loss	0–1	Adam Braidwood	TKO (punches)	MFC 11: Gridiron	February 3, 2007	1	1:54	Edmonton, Alberta, Canada	
