= David Heath (fighter) =

American mixed martial arts fighter

- Born: February 10, 1976 (age 50); Nowata, Oklahoma, United States
- Other names: The Headhunter
- Height: 5 ft 11 in (1.80 m)
- Weight: 205 lb (93 kg; 14.6 st)
- Division: Light Heavyweight; Middleweight
- Reach: 72.5 in (184 cm)
- Stance: Orthodox
- Fighting out of: Tulsa, Oklahoma, United States
- Team: Absolute Combat Alliance
- Years active: 2003–present

Mixed martial arts record
- Total: 25
- Wins: 18
- By knockout: 7
- By submission: 8
- By decision: 3
- Losses: 7
- By knockout: 1
- By submission: 3
- By decision: 3

Other information
- Mixed martial arts record from Sherdog

David Alan Heath (born February 10, 1976) is an American former mixed martial artist who last competed in the Light Heavyweight division. A professional competitor since from 2003 until 2012, he fought for the UFC, MFC, and King of the Cage.

== Mixed martial arts career ==
=== Early career ===
Heath began training in mixed martial arts in 2002 and made his professional debut in 2003. Heath compiled a record of 7-0, which included a win over Sean Salmon, while mostly fighting in his home-state of Oklahoma before being signed by the UFC.

=== UFC ===
Heath made his debut for the organization at UFC 62 on August 26, 2006, against Cory Walmsley won the bout via rear-naked choke submission in the first round. Heath next fought at UFC Fight Night 7 against Canadian Victor Valimiki and won via split decision. Heath then fought against future UFC Light Heavyweight Champion against then-undefeated Lyoto Machida at UFC 70 in England. Heath was a replacement for Machida's original opponent, Forrest Griffin, who withdrew from the bout due to a nagging staph infection. Heath was handed his first professional loss via unanimous decision and the fight was pulled off the air, being replaced for more entertaining fights. Heath apologized in post-fight interview for a "boring" and "frustrating" performance, and also said that Machida has an "ultra-boring style" of fighting.

Heath then fought longtime veteran Renato Sobral at UFC 74. Prior to the fight, Heath taunted Sobral over his recent legal difficulties and then wore a shirt displaying Sobral's police mugshot to the Octagon. While angered by the display, Sobral defeated Heath by anaconda choke in the second round after horrifically beating and bloodying his opponent to the point of grotesquerie. Sobral continued to hold the choke for four seconds after Heath tapped out, which is illegal, and ignored the commands of referee Steve Mazzagatti, who tried to physically break the hold. Renato stated during the post-fight interview that "He (Heath) has to learn respect. He deserved that. He called me 'motherfucker'." Sobral also disregarded the boos from the over 11,000 fans, saying "The crowd didn't like it? Who cares! At least they had a reaction." Sobral was released from the UFC for his actions. In a later interview, Heath has stated that he does not hold a "grudge" against Sobral but is disappointed about the "black eye" that the sport of mixed martial arts suffered after the incident.

In his next bout for the UFC a year later, Heath fought Tim Boetsch at UFC 84 and was defeated in the first round after he was thrown against the cage and hit with numerous punches. Heath, having lost three consecutive fights, was released by the UFC.

=== Post-UFC ===
After a TKO win, Heath was signed by the Canada-based MFC and lost his debut against current Bellator fighter, Emanuel Newton. Heath then bounced back with a win over former MFC Light Heavyweight Champion, Roger Hollett.

Heath lost his next two fights for the organization before defeating Solomon Hutcherson at MFC 26: Retribution via knockout from a superman punch. Heath lost his last appearance for the organization against Rodney Wallace before signing with King of the Cage.

=== King of the Cage ===
Heath signed with King of the Cage and won his first two fights for the organization in 2012.

== Mixed martial arts record ==
Professional record breakdown
25 matches	18 wins	7 losses
By knockout	7	1
By submission	8	3
By decision	3	3

Res.	Record	Opponent	Method	Event	Date	Round	Time	Location	Notes
Win	18–7	Chad Herrick	Decision (split)	KOTC: Unification	December 8, 2012	3	5:00	Tulsa, Oklahoma, United States	
Win	17–7	Sidiah Parker	TKO (punches)	KOTC: Breakthrough	March 10, 2012	2	4:48	Tulsa, Oklahoma, United States	
Loss	16–7	Rodney Wallace	Decision (unanimous)	MFC 27	November 12, 2010	3	5:00	Edmonton, Alberta, Canada	Return to Light Heavyweight.
Win	16–6	Solomon Hutcherson	KO (Superman punch)	MFC 26: Retribution	September 10, 2010	2	3:46	Edmonton, Alberta, Canada	Middleweight debut.
Win	15–6	Jason Kuchera	TKO (strikes)	Heat XC 5: Punishment	July 16, 2010	3	4:45	Edmonton, Alberta, Canada	
Win	14–6	Jason Freeman	KO (head kick)	FCF: Freestyle Cage Fighting 38	January 20, 2010	1	4:18	Tulsa, Oklahoma, United States	
Loss	13–6	Mike Nickels	Submission (rear-naked choke)	MFC 22	October 2, 2009	3	4:02	Enoch, Alberta, Canada	
Win	13–5	Wayne Cole	KO (punch)	FCF: Freestyle Cage Fighting	August 8, 2009	2	2:42	Oklahoma, United States	
Win	12–5	Shawn Dezee	KO (punches)	FCF: Freestyle Cage Fighting	June 27, 2009	1	2:47	Durant, Oklahoma, United States	
Loss	11–5	Travis Galbraith	Decision (split)	MFC 21	May 15, 2009	3	5:00	Enoch, Alberta, Canada	
Win	11–4	Roger Hollett	Submission (guillotine choke)	MFC 20	February 20, 2009	1	1:58	Enoch, Alberta, Canada	
Loss	10–4	Emanuel Newton	Submission (rear-naked choke)	MFC 18: Famous	September 26, 2008	2	1:19	Enoch, Alberta, Canada	
Win	10–3	Shepard Owens	TKO (punches)	Freestyle Cage Fighting	June 14, 2008	1	1:19	Shawnee, Oklahoma, United States	
Loss	9–3	Tim Boetsch	TKO (throw and punches)	UFC 81	February 2, 2008	1	4:52	Las Vegas, Nevada, United States	
Loss	9–2	Renato Sobral	Technical Submission (anaconda choke)	UFC 74	August 25, 2007	2	3:30	Las Vegas, Nevada, United States	
Loss	9–1	Lyoto Machida	Decision (unanimous)	UFC 70	April 21, 2007	3	5:00	Manchester, England, United Kingdom	
Win	9–0	Victor Valimaki	Decision (split)	UFC Fight Night: Sanchez vs. Riggs	December 13, 2006	3	5:00	San Diego, California, United States	
Win	8–0	Cory Walmsley	Submission (rear-naked choke)	UFC 62: Liddell vs. Sobral	August 26, 2006	1	2:32	Las Vegas, Nevada, United States	
Win	7–0	Sean Salmon	Submission	FF 5: Korea vs USA	July 15, 2006	1	0:50	McAllen, Texas, United States	
Win	6–0	Rob Wince	TKO (doctor stoppage)	FCF: Clash of the Titans	June 30, 2006	2	5:00	Tulsa, Oklahoma, United States	
Win	5–0	Chase Watson	Submission (armbar)	EFL: Battle at the Brady 4	May 20, 2006	1	1:40	Tulsa, Oklahoma, United States	
Win	4–0	Rudy Lindsey	Submission	EFL: Extreme Fighting League	March 19, 2006	1	1:40	Tulsa, Oklahoma, United States	
Win	3–0	Doug Sour	Submission (achilles lock)	KOTC 42: Buckeye Nuts	October 23, 2004	1	N/A	Concho, Oklahoma, United States	
Win	2–0	Rob Webb	Decision	EFL 12: Extreme Kickboxing 12	May 16, 2004	3	5:00	Dayton, Ohio, United States	
Win	1–0	Adam Gregg	TKO (referee stoppage)	Rock and Rumble 1	April 26, 2003	2	N/A	Tulsa, Oklahoma, United States	
