= MFC 20 =

Maximum Fighting Championship MMA event in 2009

MFC 20: Destined for Greatness
- The poster for MFC 20: Destined for Greatness
- Promotion: Maximum Fighting Championship
- Date: February 20, 2009
- Venue: River Cree Resort and Casino
- City: Enoch, Alberta

Event chronology
MFC 19: Long Time Coming	MFC 20: Destined for Greatness	MFC 21: Hard Knocks

MFC 20: Destined for Greatness was a mixed martial arts event held by the Maximum Fighting Championship (MFC) on February 20, 2009, in Enoch, Alberta.

== Fight Card ==
Main Card
Weight class				Method	Round	Time	Notes
Welterweight	Pat Healy (c)	def.	Ryan Ford	Decision (Split)	5	5:00	(Note: For the MFC Welterweight Championship)
Welterweight	Nick Thompson	def.	Paul Daley	Decision (Unanimous)	3	5:00
Welterweight	Antonio McKee	def.	Derrick Noble	Decision (Unanimous)	5	5:00	(Note: For the MFC Welterweight Championship)
Middleweight	Bryan Baker	def.	Rory Singer	TKO (Punches)	1	4:56
Light Heavyweight	David Heath	def.	Roger Hollett	Submission (Guillotine Choke)	1	2:30
Middleweight	Solomon Hutcherson	def.	Dave Mewborn	Decision (Unanimous)	3	5:00
Lightweight	Ryan Machan	def.	Simon Marini	Submission (Rear-Naked Choke)	1	1:48
Lightweight	Evan Sanguin	def.	Alain Hernandez	TKO (Slam)	1	2:50
Lightweight	Josh Russell	def.	Donovan Foley	Submission (Triangle Choke)	1	1:00
Middleweight	Brad Zazulak	def.	Richard Symons	TKO (Punches)	1	3:54

== See also ==
- Maximum Fighting Championship
- List of Maximum Fighting Championship events
- 2009 in Maximum Fighting Championship
