= Emanuel Newton =

American mixed martial arts fighter

- Born: Emanuel Issac Newton; February 1, 1984 (age 42); Inglewood, California, United States
- Other names: The Hardcore Kid; The Big Homie
- Height: 6 ft 1 in (1.85 m)
- Weight: 205 lb (93 kg; 14.6 st)
- Division: Heavyweight; Light Heavyweight
- Reach: 75 in (191 cm)
- Fighting out of: Norwalk, California, United States
- Team: Bodyshop MMA
- Years active: 2003–2017

Mixed martial arts record
- Total: 40
- Wins: 26
- By knockout: 4
- By submission: 10
- By decision: 12
- Losses: 13
- By knockout: 2
- By submission: 3
- By decision: 8
- Draws: 1

Other information
- Mixed martial arts record from Sherdog

Emanuel Newton (born February 1, 1984) is a retired American mixed martial artist who competed in Bellator's Light Heavyweight division, where he is a former Bellator Light Heavyweight World Champion. He has also competed for WEC, King of the Cage, International Fight League, and MFC. He is also a former MFC Light Heavyweight Champion.

== Background ==
Newton was born in Inglewood, California, and grew up in Torrance, California. Growing up, Newton had an interest in swimming, surfing, and lifeguarding. Newton's father had done some boxing and Muay Thai training, but died when Newton was 10 years old. Newton wrestled and played football, as a defensive end at North High School (Torrance, California). Then, six years later, Newton's mother died and Newton lost interest in his schoolwork. His poor grades did not allow him to continue playing football, but he had improved enough by the start of the wrestling season to continue in that sport. After high school, he went to Cerritos College, but began training with former UFC fighter Paul Herrera, who has also trained former UFC Light Heavyweight Champion Tito Ortiz.

== Mixed martial arts career ==
=== Early career: World Extreme Cagefighting and King of the Cage ===
Newton started his MMA career in 2003. Despite having lost his first two bouts against Brian Ebersole and Tim McKenzie respectively, he has fought for WEC once on August 20, 2004, against André Mussi, getting then his first victory via unanimous decision after three rounds.

Newton also fought for KOTC, obtaining a draw against the UFC veteran Hector Ramirez and a victory over the WEC veteran Richard Montoya.

After his win over Jeff Quinlan in IFL, Newton celebrated by buying a motorcycle. Unfortunately, Newton was involved in a crash while driving at 152 miles per hour on a highway in California. He was hit by a car and fell onto the pavement at an estimated 140 mph. He had never broken any bones before but had broken his arm from this accident. He had to have five surgeries on his arm, and developed a staph infection. The infection was so bad that he was in danger of having the arm amputated. Fortunately, the infection died down but Newton received a space between two of the bones in his arm.

=== Maximum Fighting Championship title and Shark Fights ===
With a record of 10–3–1, Newton signed with MFC.

Newton faced former UFC fighter David Heath on his debut for the title shot of the Light Heavyweight division. He won via submission in the second round.

Newton faced Roger Hollett for the title on December 5, 2008, at MFC 19. He won via unanimous decision and became the new MFC Light Heavyweight Champion.

Newton faced Trevor Prangley on May 15, 2009, at MFC 21. He lost his title via unanimous decision.

Newton also faced Ryan Jimmo, Dwayne Lewis, and Rodney Wallace on MFC. He lost his bout against Jimmo and won his last two bouts for MFC.

Newton was expected to face Ryan Jimmo again on April 8, 2011, at MFC 29 for the Light Heavyweight Championship. However, he was replaced by Zak Cummings due to injury.

On his two bouts for Shark Fights, he defeated Ilir Latifi and Ricky Shivers. In late 2011 he defeated UFC and K-1 veteran James McSweeney for Superior Cage Combat and closing a sequence of five consecutive victories, he signed with Bellator.

=== Bellator MMA ===
Newton made his debut on June 22, 2012, at Bellator 71 against Roy Boughton in the quarterfinal match of Bellator 2012 Summer Series Light Heavyweight Tournament. He won via submission in the second round and advanced to the semifinals.

On July 20, 2012, at Bellator 72 in the semifinals of the tournament he faced Attila Végh. He lost via split decision.

Newton faced Atanas Djambazov on January 17, 2013, at Bellator 85 in the quarterfinal match of Bellator Season Eight Light Heavyweight Tournament. He won via submission in the second round and advanced to the semifinals.

In the semifinals, Newton defeated former Strikeforce Light Heavyweight Champion Muhammed Lawal on February 21, 2013, at Bellator 90 via KO due to a spinning back fist.

In the finals at Bellator 94, Newton faced Mikhail Zayats and won via unanimous decision.

He was expected to face Bellator Light Heavyweight Champion Attila Végh on November 2, 2013, at Bellator 106. However, due to Vegh getting injured, Newton instead had a rematch against Muhammed Lawal for the Bellator Interim Light Heavyweight Championship. He won the fight via unanimous decision to become the Interim Bellator Light Heavyweight Champion.

Newton faced current Bellator Light Heavyweight Champion Attila Végh at Bellator 113 for a title unification bout on March 21, 2014. He won the fight via split decision to become the current unified Bellator Light Heavyweight Champion.

Newton made his first title defense against Joey Beltran on September 12, 2014, at Bellator 124. He won the fight in the third round due to a spinning back fist, the second time he has landed in his Bellator career.

Newton next faced Linton Vassell on October 24, 2014, at Bellator 130. He successfully defended his title, winning via rear naked choke submission in the fifth round.

For the third defense of his title, Newton faced Liam McGeary on February 27, 2015, in the main event at Bellator 134. He lost the back-and-forth fight via unanimous decision, during the course of the fight, Newton was nearly submitted in the first and third rounds with two triangle chokes, even being rocked at one point in the fourth round. Days after the fight, it was revealed that Newton had tested positive for Marijuana and was subsequently issued a three-month suspension by the Mohegan Tribe Department of Athletic Regulations.

Newton was a participant in Bellator's one-night Light Heavyweight tournament at Bellator MMA & Glory: Dynamite 1 on September 19, 2015. He faced Phil Davis in the opening round and lost via submission.

Newton had a rematch with Linton Vassell on February 19, 2016, at Bellator 149. He lost the fight via unanimous decision.

On October 5, 2016, Newton was released from Bellator.

=== Post-Bellator ===
Newton faced UFC veteran Nikita Krylov on October 13, 2017, at Fight Nights Global 77. He lost the fight via knockout in the first round.

== Championships and accomplishments ==
- Bellator Fighting Championships
  - Bellator Light Heavyweight World Championship (One time; former)
    - Two successful title defenses
  - Interim Bellator Light Heavyweight Championship (One time)
  - Bellator Season Eight Light Heavyweight Tournament Winner
- Maximum Fighting Championship
  - MFC Light Heavyweight Championship (One time)
- Gladiator Challenge
  - GC Light Heavyweight Championship (One time)

== Mixed martial arts record ==
Professional record breakdown
40 matches	26 wins	13 losses
By knockout	4	2
By submission	10	3
By decision	12	8
Draws	1	

Res.	Record	Opponent	Method	Event	Date	Round	Time	Location	Notes
Loss	26–13–1	Nikita Krylov	KO (knee)	Fight Nights Global 77: Krylov vs. Newton	October 13, 2017	1	0:43	Surgut, Russia	
Loss	26–12–1	Artur Astakhov	Decision (unanimous)	Fight Nights Global 61: Aleksakhin vs. Enomoto	March 11, 2017	3	5:00	Bryansk, Russia	
Loss	26–11–1	Evgeny Erokhin	Decision (unanimous)	League S-70: Plotforma 7th	August 21, 2016	3	5:00	Sochi, Krasnodar, Russia	Heavyweight bout.
Win	26–10–1	Matt Baker	Submission (arm-triangle choke)	Fight Night 2: Medicine Hat	April 9, 2016	2	3:04	Medicine Hat, Alberta, Canada	
Loss	25–10–1	Linton Vassell	Decision (unanimous)	Bellator 149	February 19, 2016	3	5:00	Houston, Texas, United States	
Loss	25–9–1	Phil Davis	Submission (kimura)	Bellator 142: Dynamite 1	September 19, 2015	1	4:39	San Jose, California, United States	Bellator Light Heavyweight Tournament Semifinal.
Loss	25–8–1	Liam McGeary	Decision (unanimous)	Bellator 134	February 27, 2015	5	5:00	Uncasville, Connecticut, United States	Lost the Bellator Light Heavyweight World Championship. Newton tested positive for marijuana.
Win	25–7–1	Linton Vassell	Submission (rear-naked choke)	Bellator 130	October 24, 2014	5	0:47	Mulvane, Kansas, United States	Defended the Bellator Light Heavyweight World Championship.
Win	24–7–1	Joey Beltran	KO (spinning back fist)	Bellator 124	September 12, 2014	3	3:07	Plymouth Township, Michigan, United States	Defended the Bellator Light Heavyweight World Championship.
Win	23–7–1	Attila Végh	Decision (split)	Bellator 113	March 21, 2014	5	5:00	Mulvane, Kansas, United States	Won and unified the Bellator Light Heavyweight World Championship.
Win	22–7–1	Muhammed Lawal	Decision (unanimous)	Bellator 106	November 2, 2013	5	5:00	Long Beach, California, United States	Won the interim Bellator Light Heavyweight Championship.
Win	21–7–1	Mikhail Zayats	Decision (unanimous)	Bellator 94	March 28, 2013	3	5:00	Tampa, Florida, United States	Bellator Season 8 Light Heavyweight Tournament Final.
Win	20–7–1	Muhammed Lawal	KO (spinning back fist)	Bellator 90	February 21, 2013	1	2:35	West Valley City, Utah, United States	Bellator Season 8 Light Heavyweight Tournament Semifinal.
Win	19–7–1	Atanas Djambazov	Submission (rear-naked choke)	Bellator 85	January 17, 2013	2	2:21	Irvine, California, United States	Bellator Season 8 Light Heavyweight Tournament Quarterfinal.
Loss	18–7–1	Attila Végh	Decision (split)	Bellator 72	July 20, 2012	3	5:00	Tampa, Florida, United States	Bellator 2012 Summer Series Light Heavyweight Tournament Semifinal.
Win	18–6–1	Roy Boughton	Submission (rear-naked choke)	Bellator 71	June 22, 2012	2	0:49	Chester, West Virginia, United States	Bellator 2012 Summer Series Light Heavyweight Tournament Quarterfinal.
Win	17–6–1	James McSweeney	Submission (rear-naked choke)	Superior Cage Combat 3	November 4, 2011	1	4:25	Las Vegas, Nevada, United States	
Win	16–6–1	Ricky Shivers	Decision (unanimous)	Shark Fights 18	August 19, 2011	3	5:00	Sparks, Nevada, United States	
Win	15–6–1	Ilir Latifi	Decision (unanimous)	Shark Fights 17: Horwich vs. Rosholt 2	July 15, 2011	3	5:00	Frisco, Texas, United States	
Win	14–6–1	Rodney Wallace	Submission (rear-naked choke)	MFC 28	February 25, 2011	2	4:34	Edmonton, Alberta, Canada	
Win	13–6–1	Dwayne Lewis	Decision (unanimous)	MFC 25	May 7, 2010	3	5:00	Edmonton, Alberta, Canada	
Loss	12–6–1	Ryan Jimmo	Decision (unanimous)	MFC 23	December 4, 2009	3	5:00	Enoch, Alberta, Canada	
Loss	12–5–1	Raphael Davis	Submission (rear-naked choke)	Called Out MMA 1	August 15, 2009	2	N/A	Ontario, California, United States	
Loss	12–4–1	Trevor Prangley	Decision (unanimous)	MFC 21	May 15, 2009	5	5:00	Enoch, Alberta, Canada	Lost the MFC Light Heavyweight Championship.
Win	12–3–1	Roger Hollett	Decision (unanimous)	MFC 19: Long Time Coming	December 5, 2008	5	5:00	Enoch, Alberta, Canada	Won the MFC Light Heavyweight Championship.
Win	11–3–1	David Heath	Submission (rear-naked choke)	MFC 18: Famous	September 26, 2008	2	4:42	Enoch, Alberta, Canada	MFC Light Heavyweight title eliminator.
Win	10–3–1	B.J. Lacy	Submission (rear-naked choke)	PureCombat 5: Hard Core	August 15, 2008	2	0:46	Visalia, California, United States	
Win	9–3–1	Jeff Quinlan	Technical Submission (arm-triangle choke)	IFL: Chicago	May 19, 2007	1	3:37	Chicago, Illinois, United States	
Win	8–3–1	Marcos Rodriguez	Submission (armbar)	COF 6: It's On!	April 14, 2007	2	4:43	Tijuana, Baja California, Mexico	
Win	7–3–1	Arthur César Jacintho	Decision	GC 59: St. Paddywack	March 17, 2007	3	5:00	Sacramento, California, United States	
Win	6–3–1	Kyacey Uscola	TKO (punches)	GC 51: Madness at the Memorial	July 1, 2006	2	0:50	Sacramento, California, United States	Won the vacant GC Light Heavyweight Championship.
Win	5–3–1	Richard Montoya	Decision (unanimous)	KOTC: Heavy Hitters	April 2, 2006	3	5:00	Coarsegold, California, United States	
Win	4–3–1	John Lansing	TKO (punches)	KOTC: Outlaws	January 21, 2006	1	1:04	Globe, Arizona, United States	
Draw	3–3–1	Hector Ramirez	Draw	KOTC 58: Prime Time	August 5, 2005	2	5:00	San Jacinto, California, United States	
Win	3–3	Nate Ducharme	Decision	GC 36: Proving Grounds	April 9, 2005	2	5:00	Lakeport, California, United States	Return to Light Heavyweight.
Loss	2–3	Mike van Arsdale	Submission (kimura)	MMA Mexico: Day 1	December 17, 2004	1	1:35	Ciudad Juárez, Chihuahua, Mexico	
Win	2–2	Bryan Pardoe	Decision (unanimous)	Venom: First Strike	September 18, 2004	2	5:00	Huntington Beach, California, United States	
Win	1–2	André Mussi	Decision (unanimous)	WEC 11	August 20, 2004	3	5:00	Lemoore, California, United States	Heavyweight debut.
Loss	0–2	Tim McKenzie	Decision (unanimous)	Rage on the River	April 17, 2004	3	3:00	Redding, California, United States	
Loss	0–1	Brian Ebersole	TKO (punches)	CFM: Ultimate Fighting Mexico	November 15, 2003	4	N/A	Monterrey, Nuevo León, Mexico	

== See also ==
- List of Bellator MMA alumni
