= Roger Hollett =

Cadadian mixed martial arts fighter

- Born: October 8, 1978 (age 48); Halifax, Nova Scotia, Canada
- Other names: The Hulk
- Height: 5 ft 10 in (1.78 m)
- Weight: 205 lb (93 kg; 14.6 st)
- Division: Light Heavyweight
- Reach: 73 in (185 cm)
- Stance: Orthodox
- Fighting out of: Halifax, Nova Scotia
- Team: Jackson's MMA
- Years active: 2006–2013

Mixed martial arts record
- Total: 18
- Wins: 13
- By knockout: 4
- By submission: 7
- By decision: 2
- Losses: 5
- By knockout: 1
- By submission: 1
- By decision: 3

Other information
- Mixed martial arts record from Sherdog

Roger Hollett (born October 8, 1978) is a retired Canadian mixed martial artist who formerly fought for the Ultimate Fighting Championship in their Light Heavyweight division. He is the former Maximum Fighting Championship Light Heavyweight Champion.

== Biography ==
Roger was born and raised in Fairview, Nova Scotia. He is the son of Canadian former boxing and kickboxing champion, Ralph Hollett, in which Roger was practiced in the disciplines of boxing and kickboxing while growing up with his father. He trains at the Titans Gym in Halifax and holds a brown belt in Brazilian Jiu-Jitsu under Kevin Taylor and Peter Martell, both being Renzo Gracie black belts. He also trains with, and is managed by Muay Thai instructor, and Muay Thai champion, Robert Walker.

== Mixed martial arts career ==
=== Early career ===
Hollett was sidelined temporarily due to torn ligaments in his left knee (ACL, MCL, and meniscus) during a takedown attempt by Lew Polley in their October 20, 2007 match, which Hollett lost via TKO, snapping his 7 fight winning streak.

Hollett made an impressive comeback at ECC 8: Comeback on September 20, 2009, defeating Marcus Hicks via TKO at 1:35 of round 1.

Following his fight with Hicks, Hollett returned to the Maximum Fighting Championship at MFC 19 on December 5, 2008, against Emanuel Newton in a bout for the vacant MFC Light Heavyweight Championship. Newton won the fight via unanimous decision and claimed the title. While Hollett threw harder strikes than his opponent, Newton was able to control Hollett throughout the fight with takedowns, low kicks, and jabs. This would mark Hollet's first time going to a decision.

Hollett lost his second straight fight to UFC veteran David Heath at MFC 20 on February 20, 2009, by submission due to a guillotine choke in the first round.

Hollett returned to action on September 26, 2009, at ECC 10: Demolition by overwhelming fellow Canadian Chris Peak in the first round via kimura, snapping his two fight losing streak.

Hollett's next fight came at the Maximum Fighting Championship's HeatXC 4: Hysteria on November 6, 2009, in Edmonton, Alberta, Canada in which he defeated Aron Lofton via armbar at 3:02 of round 1.

Roger returned to the cage after sustaining yet another injury, on October 23, 2010, at W-1 MMA 6: New Ground in Halifax, NS, facing Mychal Clark. Roger dominated Clark en route to a unanimous decision victory.

In January 2011, it was announced that Roger was scheduled to face Steve Bossé in Montreal, Quebec, Canada at Ringside MMA 10: Cote vs. Starnes. However, Bosse was forced out of the fight due to an injury. Canadian up and comer, and reigning TFC Light Heavyweight Champion, Martin Desilets was brought in as a late replacement. Roger defeated Desilets via TKO at 1:39 of round 2.

Hollett was expected to face MMA legend Jeremy Horn at ECC 14: Warrior's Soul on April 27, 2012. However, the fight was cancelled when Hollet failed his medical tests.

=== Bellator Fighting Championships ===
Hollett next defeated John Hawk via split decision at Bellator 57 to gain a spot in the Season 7 Light-Heavyweight Tournament. However, due to an injury, he was unable to compete in the tournament and was released from the promotion shortly after.

=== Ultimate Fighting Championship ===
On August 3, 2012, it was announced that Hollett had signed a UFC contract.

Hollett was expected to make his promotional debut against Matt Hamill on September 22, 2012, at UFC 152 in Toronto, Ontario, Canada. However, Hollett was forced out of the bout due to a contract dispute with Bellator and replaced by Vladimir Matyushenko. On September 11, 2012, it was announced that Hollett would fight Hamill after all after Matyushenko had to pull out of the fight due to a torn Achilles tendon. Hollett lost the fight via unanimous decision.

Hollett was expected to face Wagner Prado on January 19, 2013, at UFC on FX 7. However, Hollett was forced out of the bout with a torn bicep and was replaced by promotional newcomer Ildemar Alcantara.

Hollett had his second UFC fight against Fábio Maldonado on May 18, 2013, at UFC on FX 8. He lost the fight via unanimous decision and was subsequently released from the promotion.

== Championships and accomplishments ==
- Maximum Fighting Championship
  - MFC Light Heavyweight Championship (One time)

== Mixed martial arts record ==
Professional record breakdown
18 matches	13 wins	5 losses
By knockout	4	1
By submission	7	1
By decision	2	3

Res.	Record	Opponent	Method	Event	Date	Round	Time	Location	Notes
Loss	13–5	Fábio Maldonado	Decision (unanimous)	UFC on FX: Belfort vs. Rockhold	May 18, 2013	3	5:00	Jaraguá do Sul, Brazil	
Loss	13–4	Matt Hamill	Decision (unanimous)	UFC 152	September 22, 2012	3	5:00	Toronto, Ontario, Canada	
Win	13–3	John Hawk	Decision (split)	Bellator 57	November 12, 2011	3	5:00	Rama, Ontario, Canada	Light Heavyweight tournament quarterfinal.
Win	12–3	Martin Desilets	TKO (punches)	Ringside MMA 10: Cote vs. Starnes	April 9, 2011	2	1:39	Montreal, Quebec, Canada	
Win	11–3	Mychal Clark	Decision (unanimous)	W-1 New Ground	October 23, 2010	3	5:00	Halifax, Nova Scotia, Canada	
Win	10–3	Aron Lofton	Submission (armbar)	HeatXC 4: Hysteria	November 6, 2009	1	3:02	Edmonton, Alberta, Canada	
Win	9–3	Chris Peak	Submission (kimura)	ECC 10: Demolition	September 26, 2009	1	1:45	Halifax, Nova Scotia, Canada	
Loss	8–3	David Heath	Submission (guillotine choke)	MFC 20	February 20, 2009	1	1:58	Edmonton, Alberta, Canada	
Loss	8–2	Emanuel Newton	Decision (unanimous)	MFC 19: Long Time Coming	December 5, 2008	5	5:00	Edmonton, Alberta, Canada	Lost the MFC Light Heavyweight Championship.
Win	8–1	Marcus Hicks	TKO (punches)	ECC 8: Comeback	September 20, 2008	1	1:35	Halifax, Nova Scotia, Canada	
Loss	7–1	Lew Polley	TKO (punches)	ECC 6: Hometown Heroes	October 20, 2007	1	4:02	Halifax, Nova Scotia, Canada	For the ECC Light Heavyweight Championship.
Win	7–0	Victor Valimaki	TKO (submission to strikes)	MFC 13: Lucky 13	August 24, 2007	1	2:06	Edmonton, Alberta, Canada	Won MFC Light Heavyweight Championship.
Win	6–0	Shane Biever	KO (punches)	MFC 12: High Stakes	June 22, 2007	1	0:15	Edmonton, Alberta, Canada	
Win	5–0	Ricardeau Francois	TKO (submission to punches)	ECC 5: A Night of Champions	March 31, 2007	1	0:20	Halifax, Nova Scotia, Canada	
Win	4–0	Mike Maurer	KO (punches)	MFC 11: Gridiron	February 3, 2007	1	0:36	Edmonton, Alberta, Canada	
Win	3–0	Pay Penny	Submission (rear-naked choke)	ECC 4: Fury	December 2, 2006	1	2:37	Halifax, Nova Scotia, Canada	
Win	2–0	Jason Cecil	Submission (keylock)	ECC 3: East Coast Warriors	July 22, 2006	1	1:41	Halifax, Nova Scotia, Canada	
Win	1–0	Peter Rogers	Submission (armbar)	ECC 1: The Beginning	April 29, 2006	1	3:50	Halifax, Nova Scotia, Canada	

== See also ==
- List of male mixed martial artists
- List of Canadian UFC fighters
