= Maximum Fighting Championship =

MMA promoter based in Edmonton, Canada

- Company type: Private
- Industry: Mixed martial arts promotion
- Founded: 2001
- Founder: Mark Pavelich
- Defunct: 2014
- Headquarters: Edmonton, Alberta, Canada
- Key people: Mark Pavelich (CEO) Dave Pavelich (Vice-President) Manon Pavelich (Treasurer/Tickets)
- Parent: Pavelich Sports Inc.
- Website: http://www.maximumfighting.com

Maximum Fighting Championship was a Canadian mixed martial arts (MMA) promotion based in Edmonton, Alberta. MFC events were broadcast on The Fight Network, AXS TV (formerly HDnet) in North America and most recently TSN2. FC’s former home, in Canada, is the River Cree Resort and Casino in Enoch, Alberta, located just outside Edmonton, Alberta, but has also held events at the Edmonton Expo Centre.

== History ==
Maximum Fighting Championship was founded on March 3, 2001, by Pavelich Sports Inc. Mark Pavelich is the CEO of MFC and runs the business day to day. Dave Pavelich is Vice President and Manon Pavelich is the booker.

MFC currently airs on AXS TV Fights in the U.S. and The Fight Network in Canada. MFC’s former home was the River Cree Resort and Casino in Enoch, Alberta, Canada located just outside Edmonton, Alberta. Their new home is the Mayfield Inn Trade and Conference Centre Edmonton, Alberta. In July 2011, MFC signed a five-year live TV deal with HDnet (now AXS TV) and in October 2011, MFC signed with TSN2.

MFC hosts heavyweight fights but doesn't have a heavyweight championship due to the lack of heavyweights outside of the top promotions.

MFC employs the Unified Rules of Mixed Martial Arts. All MFC bouts take place in a ring, with the exception of MFC 29 which, in accordance with the regulations utilized in Ontario which requires all mixed martial arts fights to be held in a cage structure, took place in a circular cage named "The Ring" by the winner of a "Name the Cage" fan contest.

In 2012, MFC announced the re-launched its heavyweight division and the upcoming debut of a featherweight division. In 2013, the Maximum Fighting Championship also announced that the organization would add a bantamweight with the debut bout taking place on May 19, 2013, at MFC 37: True Grit.

MFC has not held an event since MFC 41 'All In" on October 3, 2014.

Mark Pavelich announced that Maximum Fighting Championship was up for sale on February 18, 2016.

MFC has featured notable fighters, such as Ryan Jimmo, Graham Spencer, Tom Watson and Douglas Lima, plus MMA veterans, such as Jason MacDonald, Thales Leites, Jay Silva, Trevor Prangley, and Paul Daley.

== Rules ==
MFC employs the Unified Rules of Mixed Martial Arts.

=== Rounds ===
Every round in MFC competition is five minutes in duration. Title matches have five such rounds, and non-title matches have three. There is a one-minute rest period between rounds.

=== Weight divisions ===
MFC currently uses six weight classes:

Weight class name	Upper limit	
Weight class name	in pounds (lb)	in kilograms (kg)
Bantamweight	135	61
Featherweight	145	66
Lightweight	155	70
Welterweight	170	77
Middleweight	185	84
Light Heavyweight	205	93
Heavyweight	265	120
Super Heavyweight	No weight limit	

=== Attire ===
All competitors must fight in approved shorts, without shoes. Shirts, gis or long pants (including gi pants) are not allowed. Fighters must use approved light-weight open-fingered gloves, that include at least 1" of padding around the knuckles, (110 to 170 g / 4 to 6 ounces) that allow fingers to grab. These gloves enable fighters to punch with less risk of an injured or broken hand, while retaining the ability to grab and grapple.

=== Match outcome ===
Matches usually end via:

- Submission: a fighter clearly taps on the mat or his opponent or verbally submits.
- Technical Submission: A technical submission is achieved when the referee stops a fight due to an injury resulting from a submission hold or due to a fighter going unconscious from a choke.
- Knockout: a fighter falls from a legal blow and is either unconscious or unable to immediately continue.
- Technical Knockout (TKO): If a fighter cannot continue, the fight is ended as a technical knockout. Technical knockouts can be classified into three categories:
  - referee stoppage: (the referee determines a fighter cannot "intelligently defend" himself; if warnings to the fighter to improve his position or defense go unanswered—generally, two warnings are given, about 5 seconds apart)
  - doctor stoppage (a ringside doctor due to injury or impending injury, as when blood flows into the eyes and blinds a fighter)
  - corner stoppage (a fighter's own corner-man signals defeat for their own fighter)
- Judges' Decision: Depending on scoring, a match may end as:
  - unanimous decision (all three judges score a win for fighter A)
  - majority decision (two judges score a win for fighter A, one judge scores a draw)
  - split decision (two judges score a win for fighter A, one judge scores a win for fighter B)
  - unanimous draw (all three judges score a draw)
  - majority draw (two judges score a draw, one judge scoring a win)
  - split draw (one judge scores a win for fighter A, one judge scores a win for fighter B, and one judge scores a draw)

Note: In the event of a draw, it is not necessary that the fighters' total points be equal. However, in a unanimous or split draw, each fighter does score an equal number of win judgments from the three judges (0 or 1, respectively).

A fight can also end in a technical decision, disqualification, forfeit, technical draw, or no contest. The latter two outcomes have no winners.

=== Judging criteria ===
The ten-point must system is in effect for all fights; three judges score each round and the winner of each receives ten points, the loser nine points or fewer. If the round is even, both fighters receive ten points.

=== Fouls ===
The Nevada State Athletic Commission currently lists the following as fouls:

1. Butting with the head
2. Eye gouging of any kind
3. Biting
4. Hair pulling
5. Fish hooking
6. Groin attacks of any kind
7. Putting a finger into any orifice or into any cut or laceration on an opponent. (see Gouging)
8. Small joint manipulation
9. Striking to the spine or the back of the head (see Rabbit punch)
10. Striking downward using the point of the elbow (see Elbow (strike))
11. Throat strikes of any kind, including, without limitation, grabbing the trachea
12. Clawing, pinching or twisting the flesh
13. Grabbing the clavicle
14. Kicking the head of a grounded opponent
15. Kneeing the head of a grounded opponent
16. Stomping a grounded opponent
17. Kicking to the kidney with the heel
18. Spiking an opponent to the canvas on his head or neck. (see piledriver)
19. Throwing an opponent out of the ring or fenced area
20. Holding the shorts or gloves of an opponent
21. Spitting at an opponent
22. Engaging in unsportsmanlike conduct that causes an injury to an opponent
23. Holding the ropes or the fence
24. Using abusive language in the ring or fenced area
25. Attacking an opponent on or during the break
26. Attacking an opponent who is under the care of the referee
27. Attacking an opponent after the bell (horn) has sounded the end of a round
28. Flagrantly disregarding the instructions of the referee
29. Timidity, including, without limitation, avoiding contact with an opponent, intentionally or consistently dropping the mouthpiece or faking an injury
30. Interference by the corner
31. Throwing in the towel during competition

When a foul is charged, the referee in their discretion may deduct one or more points as a penalty. If a foul incapacitates a fighter, then the match may end in a disqualification if the foul was intentional, or a no contest if unintentional. If a foul causes a fighter to be unable to continue later in the bout, it ends with a technical decision win to the injured fighter if the injured fighter is ahead on points, otherwise it is a technical draw.

=== Match conduct ===
- After a verbal warning the referee can stop the fighters and stand them up if they reach a stalemate on the ground (where neither are in a dominant position or working towards one).
- If the referee pauses the match, it is resumed with the fighters in their prior positions.
- Grabbing the ring ropes brings a verbal warning, followed by an attempt by the referee to release the grab by pulling on the grabbing hand. If that attempt fails or if the fighter continues to hold the ropes, the referee may charge a foul.

=== Title fights ===
On September 18, 2012 MFC instituted new regulations regarding title fights.

Title Fight with a reigning/defending champion

- If the champion fails to make weight:
  - SCENARIO 1 – The champion vacates the title immediately. The fight remains a five-round contest. If the vacated champion wins the fight, the Maximum Fighting Championship holds the option to automatically consider him the No. 1 contender for the next title fight in that weight class. The Maximum Fighting Championship also holds an option to make an immediate rematch.
  - SCENARIO 2 – The champion vacates the title immediately. The fight remains a five-round contest. If the challenger wins the fight, the challenger becomes the MFC champion. The Maximum Fighting Championship holds an option to make an immediate rematch.
- If the challenger fails to make weight:
  - The champion automatically retains the belt. A non-title fight takes place and the Maximum Fighting Championship solely determines if the bout is a three- or five-round fight. If the challenger wins the bout, the Maximum Fighting Championship holds an option to make a future rematch.
- If both fighters fail to make weight:
  - The champion vacates the title immediately. A non-title fight takes place and the Maximum Fighting Championship solely determines if the bout is a three- or five-round fight. The Maximum Fighting Championship holds the option to consider the winner of the bout as the No. 1 contender for the next title fight in that weight class. The Maximum Fighting Championship also holds an option to make future rematch.

Title Fight with a vacant championship

- If one fighter fails to make weight:
  - The fight remains a five-round contest. If the fighter who made weight wins the bout, he becomes the MFC champion of that weight class. If the fighter who failed to make weight wins the bout, that fighter does not claim the title, and the Maximum Fighting Championship holds the option to make him the No. 1 contender and/or to make an immediate rematch.
- If both fighters fail to make weight:
  - A non-title bout takes place and the Maximum Fighting Championship solely determines if the bout is a three- or five-round fight. The Maximum Fighting Championship holds the option to make a future rematch.

== Events ==
As of October 3, 2014, the Maximum Fighting Championship has held a total of 44 events, all of which have taken place in Alberta, Canada, with the exception of MFC 29 which took place in Windsor, Ontario, Canada.

== Current champions ==
Division	Upper weight limit	Champion	Since	Title Defenses	Next fight
Heavyweight	265 lb (120 kg; 18.9 st)	Vacant			
Light Heavyweight	205 lb (93 kg; 14.6 st)	Vacant			
Middleweight	185 lb (84 kg; 13.2 st)	Vacant			
Welterweight	170 lb (77 kg; 12 st)	Vacant			
Lightweight	155 lb (70 kg; 11.1 st)	(United States) Tom Gallicchio	May 9, 2014	0	
Featherweight	145 lb (66 kg; 10.4 st)	Vacant			
Bantamweight	135 lb (61 kg; 9.6 st)	Vacant			

== Title history ==
=== Heavyweight Championship ===
Weight limit: 265 lb (120.2 kg)

No.	Name	Event	Date	Defenses
1	(United States) Anthony Hamilton def. Smealinho Rama	MFC 38: Behind Enemy Lines; Edmonton, Alberta, Canada	October 4, 2013	1. def. Darrill Schoonover at MFC 39: No Remorse on Jan. 17, 2014
Hamilton vacated the title when he left MFC for the UFC.

=== Light Heavyweight Championship ===
Weight limit: 205 lb (93.0 kg)

No.	Name	Event	Date	Defenses
1	(Canada) Victor Välimäki def. Jason Day	MFC 10: Unfinished Business; Edmonton, Alberta, Canada	September 8, 2006	1. def. Jared Kilkenny at MFC 11: Gridiron on Feb 3, 2007
2	(Canada) Roger Hollett	MFC 13: Lucky 13; Edmonton, Alberta, Canada	August 24, 2007	
3	(United States) Emanuel Newton	MFC 19: Long Time Coming; Edmonton, Alberta, Canada	December 5, 2008	
4	(South Africa) Trevor Prangley	MFC 21: Hard Knocks; Edmonton, Alberta, Canada	May 15, 2009	
Trevor Prangley was stripped of the title and released from MFC on October 25, 2009.
5	(Canada) Ryan Jimmo def. Dwayne Lewis	MFC 28: Supemacy; Edmonton, Alberta, Canada	February 25, 2011	1. def. Zak Cummings at MFC 29: Conquer on Apr 8, 2011; 2. def. Rameau Thierry Sokoudjou at MFC 31: The Rundown on Oct 7, 2011
Jimmo vacated the title on November 29, 2011 when he left MFC for the UFC.

=== Middleweight Championship ===
Weight limit: 185 lb (83.9 kg)

No.	Name	Event	Date	Defenses
1	(Canada) Patrick Côté def. Jason MacDonald	MFC 9: No Excuses; Edmonton, Alberta, Canada	March 10, 2006	
Côté is stripped of the title.
2	(Bosnia and Herzegovina) Elvis Mutapčić def. Joseph Henle	MFC 35: Explosive Encounter; Edmonton, Alberta, Canada	October 26, 2012	1. def. Sam Alvey at MFC 36: Reality Check on Feb. 15, 2013
Mutapčić vacated the title when he signed with World Series of Fighting.
3	(United States) Sam Alvey def. Jason South	MFC 38: Behind Enemy Lines; Edmonton, Alberta, Canada	October 4, 2013	1. def. Wes Swofford at MFC 40: Crowned Kings on May 9, 2014
Alvey vacated the title when he left MFC for the UFC.

=== Welterweight Championship ===
Weight limit: 170 lb (77.1 kg)

No.	Name	Event	Date	Defenses
1	(United States) Pat Healy def. Ryan Ford	MFC 17: Hostile Takeover; Edmonton, Alberta, Canada	July 25, 2008	1. def. Ryan Ford at MFC 20: Destined for Greatness on Feb 20, 2009
Healy vacated the title when he left MFC for Strikeforce.
2	(Brazil) Douglas Lima def. Jesse Juarez	MFC 27: Breaking Point; Edmonton, Alberta, Canada	November 12, 2010	1. def. Terry Martin at MFC 29: Conquer on Apr 8, 2011
Lima vacated the title on May 9, 2011 when he left MFC for Bellator.
3	(United States) Nathan Coy def. Ryan McGillivray	MFC 33: Collision Course; Edmonton, Alberta, Canada	May 4, 2012	
Coy vacated the title when he left MFC for Bellator.

=== Lightweight Championship ===
Weight limit: 155 lb (70.3 kg)

No.	Name	Event	Date	Defenses
1	(United States) Antonio McKee def. Derrick Noble	MFC 20: Destined for Greatness; Edmonton, Alberta, Canada	February 20, 2009	1. def. Luciano Azevedo at MFC 26: Retribution on Sep 10, 2010
On April 26, 2011, MFC announced that McKee had agreed to "mutually vacate" the title, a statement McKee denied.
On July 1, 2011, MFC announced that McKee had reached a new deal with the promotion, and was reinstated as champion.
McKee is stripped of the title on January 26, 2012 when he failed to make weight for his MFC 32 title defense.
2	(Canada) Graham Spencer def. Mukai Maromo	MFC 36: Reality Check; Edmonton, Alberta, Canada	February 15, 2013	
Spencer vacated the title on November 28, 2013 due to lingering injuries. He plans to drop to the featherweight division when he returns in 2014.
3	(United States) Tom Gallicchio def. Kurt Southern	MFC 40: Crowned Kings; Edmonton, Alberta, Canada	May 9, 2014	

=== Bantamweight Championship ===
Weight limit: 140 lb (63.5 kg)

No.	Name	Event	Date	Defenses
1	(United States) Anthony Birchak def. Tito Jones	MFC 38: Behind Enemy Lines; Edmonton, Alberta, Canada	October 4, 2013	
Birchak was stripped of the title and released from the organization on Aug. 7, 2014 when it was confirmed he would no longer be able to cross the Canada–US border for fights.

== Champions by nationality ==
Country	Champions
United States	9
Canada	4
Brazil	1
South Africa	1
Bosnia and Herzegovina	1
