= Kendall Grove =

American mixed martial arts fighter (born 1982)

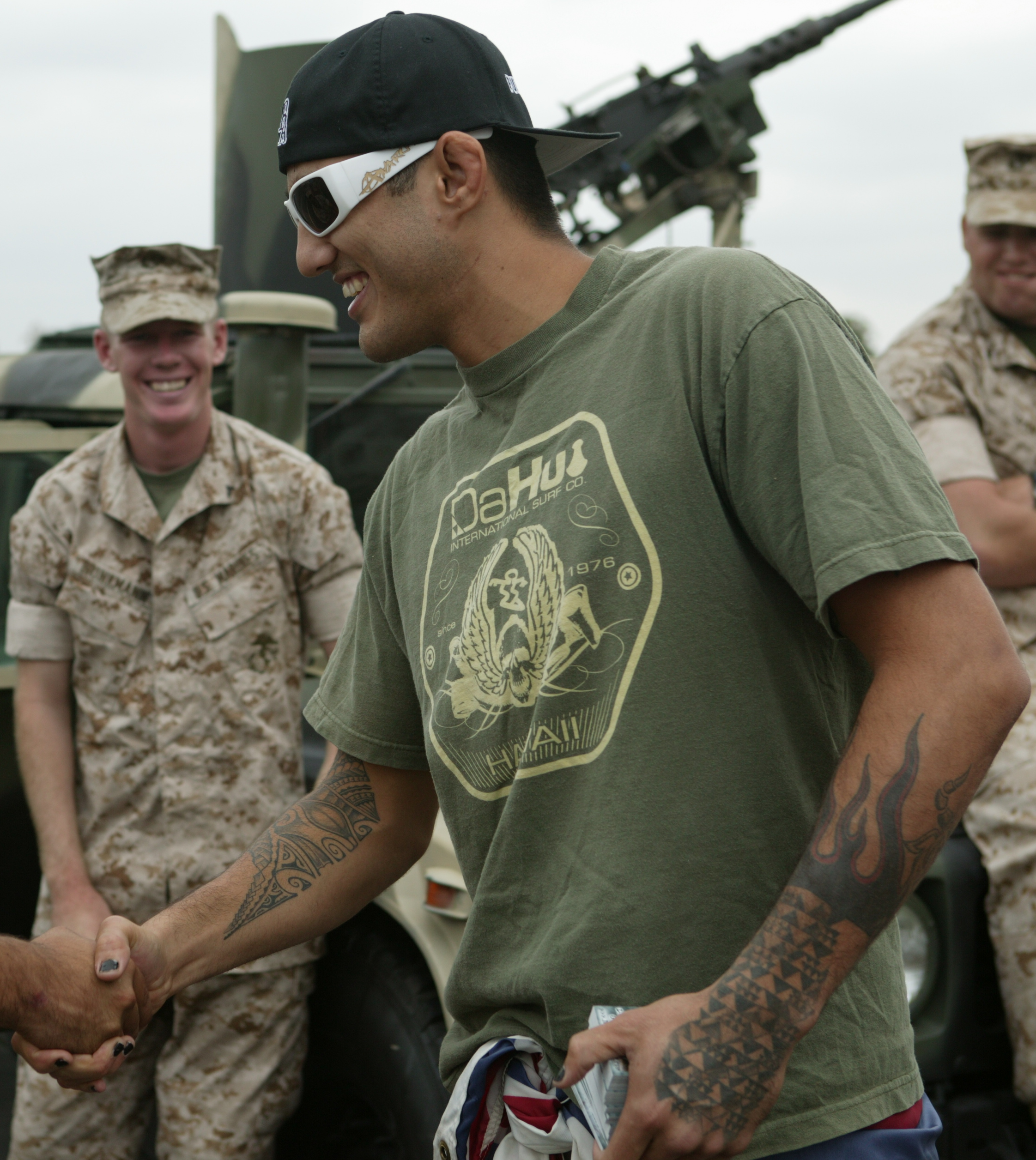
- Born: Kendall Grove; November 12, 1982 (age 43); Wailuku, Maui, Hawaii, U.S.
- Other names: Da Spyder
- Height: 6 ft 6 in (198 cm)
- Weight: 185 lb (84 kg; 13 st 3 lb)
- Division: Light Heavyweight; Middleweight
- Reach: 79 in (201 cm)
- Stance: Orthodox
- Fighting out of: Maui, Hawaii, United States
- Team: Cobra Kai (2002–2008); Team Punishment (2006–2008); Misfits MMA; Maui Jiujitsu; Straight Rootless Fight Team
- Rank: 2nd degree black belt in Brazilian Jiu-Jitsu under Jake Mapes
- Years active: 2003–present

Mixed martial arts record
- Total: 44
- Wins: 24
- By knockout: 7
- By submission: 11
- By decision: 6
- Losses: 19
- By knockout: 9
- By submission: 4
- By decision: 6
- No contests: 1

Other information
- Mixed martial arts record from Sherdog

Kendall Grove (born November 12, 1982) is an American mixed martial artist who is currently signed to Bare Knuckle Fighting Championship. A professional competitor since 2003, he has also competed for the Bellator MMA, UFC, KSW, ProElite, King of the Cage, and was the winner of The Ultimate Fighter 3 on Spike TV.

== Early life ==
Grove was born in Wailuku, Maui, Hawaii and is a graduate of Baldwin High School in Wailuku, Hawaii, where he was a high school wrestler and played football. Grove has a mixed ethnic heritage of Native Hawaiian, Samoan, Spanish, and Native American bloodlines. Kendall trained Brazilian jiu-jitsu in his freshman year in the high school and moved to Las Vegas in 2002 to focus in the sport. However, he got intrigued in mixed martial arts and begun training all aspects of it.

== Mixed martial arts career ==
=== The Ultimate Fighter ===
While on The Ultimate Fighter 3, Grove trained under Tito Ortiz, and won a preliminary victory against Ross Pointon by rear naked choke and in the semi-finals defeated Kalib Starnes by submission after a rib injury sustained by Starnes during the fight caused him to verbally submit. He defeated Ed Herman in the finals by unanimous decision (29–28, 29–28, and 29–28) in the series finale, winning a six-figure contract with the Ultimate Fighting Championship.

=== Ultimate Fighting Championship ===
In his first bout since the show on October 10, 2006, Grove defeated then-undefeated Chris Price via submission (elbows) in the first round at Ortiz vs. Shamrock 3: The Final Chapter.

After the taping of the series, Grove was invited to Ortiz's training camp, Team Punishment and has trained with Ortiz along with many of his former teammates on The Ultimate Fighter 3 at Ortiz's Big Bear City, California, training facility. He has trained with Randy Couture's camp at Xtreme Couture. Since his loss to Jorge Rivera, he has moved back to Hawaii and has trained there with his friend B.J. Penn.

In his next fight at UFC 69 he faced up and coming prospect Alan Belcher. After a close first round Grove came out strong in round two. Grove rocked Belcher with punches and knees from the clinch. With just over two minutes remaining in the round Grove secured a double-leg takedown. As Belcher scrambled to escape Grove locked in a D'Arce choke which rendered Belcher unconscious giving Grove the victory by technical submission at 4:42 of round two. It was the first D'Arce choke in UFC history.

At UFC 74, Grove faced UFC veteran Patrick Côté. Côté defeated Grove via first-round TKO. Grove experienced his second consecutive loss at UFC 80 to Jorge Rivera losing by KO at 1:20 in the first round.

Grove faced Evan Tanner at The Ultimate Fighter: Team Rampage vs Team Forrest Finale on June 21, 2008. The bout saw Grove bloody Tanner and frustrate the former middleweight champion by stopping his takedowns and getting back up immediately following being sent to the floor. Grove won a split decision (28–29, 30–26, and 30–26) to snap his two fight losing streak.

Grove then defeated Jason Day by TKO at UFC 96. In his next appearance at UFC 101, Grove lost to Ricardo Almeida by unanimous decision.

At UFC 106 Grove defeated Jake Rosholt by triangle choke at 3:59 of the first round.

Grove next faced middleweight prospect Mark Muñoz at UFC 112 in a bout that would earn Fight of the Night honors. After a successful first round with several near submissions, Grove lost via TKO at 2:50 in the 2nd round.

Grove faced Goran Reljic on July 3, 2010, at UFC 116. Grove won via split decision (28–29, 30–27, and 29–28).

Grove next fought Demian Maia on December 4, 2010, at The Ultimate Fighter: Team GSP vs. Team Koscheck Finale. Grove lost the fight via unanimous decision (29–28, 29–28, and 29–28).

Grove faced Tim Boetsch on May 28, 2011, at UFC 130 and lost via unanimous decision.

On June 17, 2011, Grove announced via Facebook that he had been released from the UFC, along with welterweight Chuck O'Neil. He became the third Ultimate Fighter winner to be released following Efraín Escudero from Season Eight and Travis Lutter from Season Four.

=== ProElite ===
Grove fought Joe Riggs at ProElite 1 This was a rematch of their previous encounter at Rumble on the Rock 5, a match which Riggs won. Grove won via guillotine choke submission 59 seconds into round 1.

Grove fought Ikuhisa Minowa at ProElite 3 on January 21, 2012. He won the fight by unanimous decision.

=== Independent Promotions ===
Grove headlined against Jay Silva on February 16 in Las Vegas, Nevada. Grove lost the fight via submission in the second round.

Grove's next fight was against undefeated Derek Brunson for the ShoFight Middleweight Championship. Grove won via split decision.

Grove next fought Ariel Gandulla in Victoria, Canada at Aggression Fighting Championship 13 on November 3, 2012. Grove defeated Gandulla by TKO in the second round.

=== KSW ===
On December 1, 2012, Grove faced Mamed Khalidov at KSW 21 event in Poland. He lost by submission in the second round.

On June 8, 2013, he fought Michał Materla, for KSW Middleweight Championship and lost by unanimous decision.

=== Bellator MMA ===
Grove made his promotional debut at Bellator 104 on October 18, 2013, with a three-round decision victory over Joe Vedepo.

In 2014, Grove entered the Bellator Season 10 Middleweight tournament. He faced Brett Cooper at Bellator 114 on March 28, 2014. He lost the fight via knockout in the second round.

Grove faced former Bellator Light Heavyweight champion Christian M'Pumbu on October 3, 2014, at Bellator 127. He won the fight via submission in the second round.

Grove faced Brandon Halsey for the Bellator Middleweight Championship on May 15, 2015, at Bellator 137. He lost the fight via TKO in the fourth round.

Grove next faced Joey Beltran at Bellator 143 on September 25, 2015. He won the fight via TKO in the third round.

Grove then faced Francisco France at Bellator 150 on February 26, 2016. He again won the fight via knockout, this time in the first round.

Following two knockout victories, Grove faced former Bellator middleweight champion, Alexander Shlemenko, in the main event at Bellator 162. Grove lost the fight via TKO in the second round.

Grove was originally scheduled to face Chris Honeycutt at Bellator 174 on March 3, 2017. However, Honeycutt was removed from the bout on February 28 and replaced by Mike Rhodes. Rhodes was then unable to make the required weight, and the bout scratched after they were unable to come to an agreement for the bout to proceed at a catchweight.

Grove faced John Salter at Bellator 181 on July 14, 2017. He lost the fight via technical submission in the first round.

Grove faced A.J. Matthews at Bellator 193 on January 26, 2018. He lost the fight via split decision and was subsequently released from the promotion.

=== Golden Boy Promotions ===
Grove was expected to face Andre Walker on Golden Boy Promotions' inaugural MMA event on November 24, 2018, but the fight never made it to fruition.

=== Other regional promotions ===
Grove was scheduled to face Casey Ryan at LXF 6 on March 20, 2020, but the event was cancelled due to the COVID-19 pandemic.

Ten years after their first bout with Grove lost by unanimous decision, Grove rematched Michał Materla on January 21, 2023, at KSW 78, losing the bout in the second round after being dropped and finished with ground and pound.

== Bare knuckle boxing ==
After three straight losses in Bellator, Grove signed to a new promotion, Bare Knuckle FC and debuted on August 25, 2018 at BKFC 2. He faced Bruce Abramski and won the bout by unanimous decision.

In his sophomore bout in BKFC, Grove faced Marcel Stamps at BKFC 3 on October 20, 2018. He lost the fight via knockout.

Grove next faced fellow UFC veteran Hector Lombard at BKFC 12 on September 11, 2020. He lost the fight via knockout in the first round.

== Personal life ==
Grove and wife Anna, have six children together: two sons and four daughters.

== Championships and achievements ==
- Ultimate Fighting Championship
  - The Ultimate Fighter Season 3 Tournament Winner
  - Fight of the Night (Two times)
  - Knockout of the Night (One time)
  - UFC.com Awards
    - 2006: Ranked #3 Fight of the Year vs. Ed Herman
- ShoFight
  - ShoFight Middleweight Championship (One time)

== Mixed martial arts record ==
Professional record breakdown
44 matches	24 wins	19 losses
By knockout	7	9
By submission	11	4
By decision	6	6
No contests	1	

Res.	Record	Opponent	Method	Event	Date	Round	Time	Location	Notes
Loss	24–19 (1)	Michał Materla	TKO (punches)	KSW 78	January 21, 2023	2	4:27	Szczecin, Poland	Catchweight (195 lbs) bout.
Win	24–18 (1)	Anthony Ruiz	Submission (triangle choke)	WFC 110	August 10, 2019	1	4:30	Wailuku, Hawaii, United States	Catchweight (195 lbs) bout.
Loss	23–18 (1)	A.J. Matthews	Decision (split)	Bellator 193	January 26, 2018	3	5:00	Temecula, California, United States	
Loss	23–17 (1)	John Salter	Technical Submission (rear-naked choke)	Bellator 181	July 14, 2017	1	4:37	Thackerville, Oklahoma, United States	
Loss	23–16 (1)	Alexander Shlemenko	TKO (punches)	Bellator 162	October 21, 2016	2	1:43	Memphis, Tennessee, United States	
Win	23–15 (1)	Francisco France	KO (punches)	Bellator 150	February 26, 2016	2	0:35	Mulvane, Kansas, United States	
Win	22–15 (1)	Joey Beltran	TKO (punches)	Bellator 143	September 25, 2015	3	2:27	Hidalgo, Texas, United States	
Loss	21–15 (1)	Brandon Halsey	TKO (punches)	Bellator 137	May 15, 2015	4	2:25	Temecula, California, United States	For the Bellator Middleweight World Championship. Halsey missed weight (188 lbs) and was stripped of the championship and only Grove was eligible to win the title.
Win	21–14 (1)	Christian M'Pumbu	Submission (rear-naked choke)	Bellator 127	October 3, 2014	2	4:14	Temecula, California, United States	
Loss	20–14 (1)	Brett Cooper	KO (punches)	Bellator 114	March 28, 2014	2	3:33	West Valley City, Utah, United States	Bellator Season Ten Middleweight Tournament Semifinal.
Win	20–13 (1)	Joe Vedepo	Decision (unanimous)	Bellator 104	October 18, 2013	3	5:00	Cedar Rapids, Iowa, United States	
Win	19–13 (1)	Danny Mitchell	TKO (punches)	GWC: The British Invasion: US vs. UK	June 29, 2013	1	4:53	Kansas City, Missouri, United States	
Loss	18–13 (1)	Michał Materla	Decision (unanimous)	KSW 23	June 8, 2013	4	5:00	Gdańsk, Poland	for the KSW Middleweight Championship.
Loss	18–12 (1)	Jesse Taylor	Decision (unanimous)	K-Oz Entertainment: Bragging Rights 5	February 23, 2013	5	5:00	Perth, Western Australia	For the K-Oz Entertainment Middleweight Championship.
Loss	18–11 (1)	Mamed Khalidov	Submission (achilles lock)	KSW 21	December 1, 2012	2	1:31	Warsaw, Poland	
Win	18–10 (1)	Chris Cisneros	TKO (punches)	RWE: Just Scrap 3	November 10, 2012	2	4:30	Maui, Hawaii, United States	
Win	17–10 (1)	Ariel Gandulla	TKO (punches)	AFC 13: Natural Selection	November 3, 2012	2	4:45	Victoria, British Columbia, Canada	
Win	16–10 (1)	Joe Cronin	Submission (D'Arce choke)	RWE: Just Scrap 2	September 8, 2012	1	1:20	Lahaina, Hawaii, United States	
Win	15–10 (1)	Derek Brunson	Decision (split)	ShoFight 20	June 16, 2012	3	5:00	Springfield, Missouri, United States	Won the ShoFight Middleweight Championship. Brunson missed weight (190 lbs); title on the line for Grove only.
Loss	14–10 (1)	Jay Silva	Technical Submission (arm-triangle choke)	Superior Cage Combat 4	February 16, 2012	2	1:52	Las Vegas, Nevada, United States	
Win	14–9 (1)	Ikuhisa Minowa	Decision (unanimous)	ProElite 3	January 21, 2012	3	5:00	Honolulu, Hawaii, United States	
Win	13–9 (1)	Joe Riggs	Submission (guillotine choke)	ProElite: Arlovski vs. Lopez	August 27, 2011	1	0:59	Honolulu, Hawaii, United States	
Loss	12–9 (1)	Tim Boetsch	Decision (unanimous)	UFC 130	May 28, 2011	3	5:00	Las Vegas, Nevada, United States	
Loss	12–8 (1)	Demian Maia	Decision (unanimous)	The Ultimate Fighter: Team GSP vs. Team Koscheck Finale	December 4, 2010	3	5:00	Las Vegas, Nevada, United States	
Win	12–7 (1)	Goran Reljic	Decision (split)	UFC 116	July 3, 2010	3	5:00	Las Vegas, Nevada, United States	
Loss	11–7 (1)	Mark Muñoz	TKO (punches)	UFC 112	April 10, 2010	2	2:50	Abu Dhabi, United Arab Emirates	Fight of the Night.
Win	11–6 (1)	Jake Rosholt	Submission (triangle choke)	UFC 106	November 21, 2009	1	3:59	Las Vegas, Nevada, United States	
Loss	10–6 (1)	Ricardo Almeida	Decision (unanimous)	UFC 101	August 8, 2009	3	5:00	Philadelphia, Pennsylvania, United States	
Win	10–5 (1)	Jason Day	TKO (punches and elbows)	UFC 96	March 7, 2009	1	1:32	Columbus, Ohio, United States	
Win	9–5 (1)	Evan Tanner	Decision (split)	The Ultimate Fighter: Team Rampage vs Team Forrest Finale	June 21, 2008	3	5:00	Las Vegas, Nevada, United States	
Loss	8–5 (1)	Jorge Rivera	KO (punches)	UFC 80	January 19, 2008	1	1:20	Newcastle upon Tyne, England	
Loss	8–4 (1)	Patrick Côté	TKO (punches)	UFC 74	August 25, 2007	1	4:45	Las Vegas, Nevada, United States	
Win	8–3 (1)	Alan Belcher	Submission (D'Arce choke)	UFC 69	April 7, 2007	2	4:42	Houston, Texas, United States	Submission of the Night.
Win	7–3 (1)	Chris Price	Submission (elbows)	Ortiz vs. Shamrock 3: The Final Chapter	October 10, 2006	1	3:59	Hollywood, Florida, United States	
Win	6–3 (1)	Ed Herman	Decision (unanimous)	The Ultimate Fighter: Team Ortiz vs. Team Shamrock Finale	June 24, 2006	3	5:00	Las Vegas, Nevada, United States	Won The Ultimate Fighter 3: Middleweight Tournament; Fight of the Night.
Win	5–3 (1)	Jay Carter	Submission (triangle choke)	Rumble on the Rock: Showdown in Maui	October 7, 2005	1	3:25	Maui, Hawaii, United States	
Loss	4–3 (1)	Hector Ramirez	KO (punch)	KOTC: Mortal Sins	May 7, 2005	1	1:08	Primm, Nevada, United States	Light Heavyweight bout.
Win	4–2 (1)	Matt Gidney	Submission (rear-naked choke)	TC 8-Total Combat 8	April 2, 2005	1	2:28	Tijuana, Mexico	
Loss	3–2 (1)	Savant Young	Technical Submission (guillotine choke)	Lockdown in Paradise 1	March 19, 2005	1	2:00	Lahaina, Hawaii, United States	Catchweight (192 lbs) bout; Grove missed weight.
Win	3–1 (1)	Matt Hendricks	TKO (punches)	Total Combat 7	January 29, 2005	2	N/A	Tijuana, Mexico	
NC	2–1 (1)	Ricky Gunz	NC	Total Combat 6	October 24, 2004	1	N/A	Tijuana, Mexico	
Loss	2–1	Joe Riggs	KO (elbows)	Rumble on the Rock 5	May 7, 2004	1	3:09	Honolulu, Hawaii, United States	
Win	2–0	Kaipo Kalama	Submission (rear-naked choke)	SuperBrawl 34	March 28, 2004	2	3:16	Wailuku, Hawaii, United States	
Win	1–0	Tripstin Kersiano	Submission (triangle choke)	KFC 3: Island Pride	July 27, 2003	1	2:04	Wailuku, Hawaii, United States	

== Mixed martial arts exhibition match record ==
Professional record breakdown
2 matches	2 wins	0 losses
By knockout	0	0
By submission	2	0
By decision	0	0

Result	Record	Opponent	Method	Event	Date	Round	Time	Location	Notes
Win	2–0	Kalib Starnes	Verbal Submission (rib injury)	The Ultimate Fighter 3	June 8, 2006	3	0:30	Las Vegas, Nevada, United States	Semi-finals.
Win	1–0	Ross Pointon	Submission (rear-naked choke)	The Ultimate Fighter 3	April 20, 2006	1	3:45	Las Vegas, Nevada, United States	Elimination bout.

== Bare knuckle record ==
Professional record breakdown
3 matches	1 win	2 losses
By knockout	0	2
By submission	0	0
By decision	1	0

Res.	Record	Opponent	Method	Event	Date	Round	Time	Location	Notes
Loss	1–2	Hector Lombard	TKO (punch)	BKFC 12	September 11, 2020	1	1:50	Daytona Beach, Florida, United States	
Loss	1–1	Marcel Stamps	KO (punches)	BKFC 3	October 20, 2018	3	0:47	Biloxi, Mississippi, United States	
Win	1–0	Bruce Abramski	Decision (unanimous)	BKFC 2	August 25, 2018	5	2:00	Biloxi, Mississippi, United States	

== See also ==
- List of Bellator MMA alumni
