= Jason MacDonald =

Canadian mixed martial arts fighter

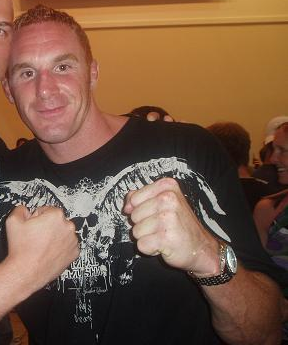
- Born: Jason Anthony MacDonald; June 3, 1975 (age 51); New Glasgow, Nova Scotia, Canada
- Other names: The Athlete
- Height: 6 ft 2 in (1.88 m)
- Weight: 185 lb (84 kg; 13.2 st)
- Division: Light Heavyweight; Middleweight
- Reach: 80 in (203 cm)
- Stance: Orthodox
- Fighting out of: Edmonton, Alberta, Canada
- Team: Pure Fitness; Gracie Barra Calgary
- Rank: Black belt in Brazilian Jiu-Jitsu
- Years active: 1999–2013

Mixed martial arts record
- Total: 41
- Wins: 25
- By knockout: 3
- By submission: 19
- By decision: 3
- Losses: 16
- By knockout: 6
- By submission: 5
- By decision: 5

Other information
- Mixed martial arts record from Sherdog

Jason Anthony MacDonald (born June 3, 1975) is a Canadian former mixed martial artist. A professional from 1999 until 2013, he is perhaps best remembered for his two stints in the UFC, but also fought for King of the Cage, and the Maximum Fighting Championship. Known for his grappling skills, 19 of his 25 career wins came by way of submission.

== Mixed martial arts career ==
=== Early career ===
MacDonald began his career in local Canadian promotions, including the MFC, racking up a 16-7 professional record which included wins over UFC veterans Joe Doerksen, Gideon Ray, and Bill Mahood.

=== Ultimate Fighting Championship ===
MacDonald made his UFC debut on October 10, 2006, at Ortiz vs. Shamrock 3: The Final Chapter against the favored The Ultimate Fighter 3 finalist Ed Herman. In an upset, MacDonald won the bout via triangle choke in the first round. MacDonald followed up the performance with a win over The Ultimate Fighter 1 veteran Chris Leben via modified guillotine choke in the second round. Both victories earned Submission of the Night honors.

MacDonald lost in competition at UFC 68 with a match-up against Rich Franklin in his first appearance since losing the UFC Middleweight Championship to Anderson Silva. Franklin mounted MacDonald in the final seconds of round two, causing enough injury to MacDonald's left eye area that his corner advised him to throw in the towel, and Franklin was declared the winner.

At UFC 72, MacDonald rebounded from his loss to Franklin with a second-round TKO victory over Rory Singer. This marked his third victory over The Ultimate Fighter veterans.

At UFC 77, MacDonald faced Yushin Okami, who was coming off a loss to Franklin in a title contention elimination bout. MacDonald lost the fight via unanimous decision (30-27, 30-27, 30-27).

MacDonald fell back from the defeat at UFC 83, defeating Joe Doerksen via TKO (elbows) in the second round and earning a $75,000 bonus for Knockout of the Night in the process. A small controversy erupted after MacDonald landed two hammerfists after it appeared the fight had been stopped. In an interview the day after the fight, MacDonald explained that the referee had instructed him to continue fighting and had even apologized to him for his error in judgment.

At UFC 87, MacDonald faced Brazilian Demian Maia. The fight took place almost completely on the ground, with MacDonald escaping numerous submission attempts. Ultimately in the third round, Maia locked in a rear-naked choke for the victory.

Only a month later, MacDonald went on to fight as a replacement for Jason Day at UFC 88. He won against Jason Lambert at 1:20 of round two by rear-naked choke, earning his third Submission of the Night bonus.

MacDonald followed up with a bout at The Ultimate Fighter: Team Nogueira vs Team Mir Finale against Wilson Gouveia. MacDonald lost the fight via submission due to elbows after being dropped with a glancing left jab by Gouveia and pounded on for the stoppage.

At UFC 97, MacDonald suffered a first-round TKO loss to Nate Quarry due to elbows from a mounted position.

Despite earlier suggestions from Dana White that MacDonald's position in the UFC roster was safe despite his recent lack of success, the UFC released MacDonald several weeks later. Matchmaker Joe Silva commented that the door would be left open for MacDonald to return should he earn a few more victories in smaller promotions.

=== Post-UFC Release ===
At the MFC 21 event on May 15, 2009, MacDonald announced that he was returning to the Canadian promotion Maximum Fighting Championship. He fought Travis Lutter in the main event of MFC 22 on October 2, 2009, losing a unanimous decision.

Jason MacDonald faced TUF 3 competitor and fellow UFC veteran Solomon Hutcherson at MFC 23 defeating him by split decision giving MacDonald his fifth victory over a TUF competitor.

On March 20, 2010, MacDonald replaced Denis Kang in the main event of W1 Bad Blood. He defeated Vernon White in the 3rd round via triangle choke.

On April 23, 2010, MacDonald defeated Matt Horwich via unanimous decision in the main event of the very first Let's Get It On MMA tournament event.

=== Return to the UFC ===
MacDonald returned to the UFC and faced up and coming wrestler John Salter on May 8, 2010, at UFC 113, replacing an injured Nick Catone. After 2:42 of the first round, MacDonald's leg broke during a takedown attempt by Salter and the fight was stopped, declaring Salter the winner by TKO due to injury.

MacDonald was scheduled to face Rafael Natal on December 11, 2010, at UFC 124, but pulled out of the fight after suffering an injury in training.

Nearly a year after his last bout, MacDonald fought and submitted Ryan Jensen via first-round triangle choke at UFC 129 on April 30, 2011.

MacDonald faced Alan Belcher on September 17, 2011 at UFC Fight Night 25, losing via verbal submission due to strikes in the first round.

MacDonald faced Tom Lawlor on May 15, 2012 at UFC on Fuel TV: Korean Zombie vs. Poirier. He lost the fight via KO in the first round. On February 28, 2013, MacDonald announced his retirement from MMA, leaving his UFC record standing at 6-8.

== MMA Business ==
MacDonald owns and runs his own gym, Pure Fitness & MMA, located in Red Deer, Alberta, Canada. He also runs his own fight promotion called Pure Fighting Championship. He manages a number of Canadian professional MMA fighters, including Ryan Machan, Evan Sanguin, George Belanger and Derek Clark.

== Personal life ==
MacDonald and his wife Kelly have four children, sons Tristin and Keel and daughters Jett and True.

Jason is also a CrossFit Trainer, and works for CrossFit HQ co-teaching the CrossFit Level 1 Trainer Certification course.

== Championships and accomplishments ==
- Ultimate Fighting Championship
  - Knockout of the Night (One time) vs. Joe Doerksen
  - Submission of the Night (Three times) vs. Chris Leben, Ed Herman, Jason Lambert
  - UFC.com Awards
    - 2006: Ranked #4 Submission of the Year vs. Chris Leben
    - 2008: Ranked #5 Fight of the Year vs. Demian Maia
- Absolute Fighting Championships
  - AFC Light Heavyweight Championship (One time)

== Mixed martial arts record ==
Professional record breakdown
41 matches	25 wins	16 losses
By knockout	3	6
By submission	19	5
By decision	3	5

Res.	Record	Opponent	Method	Event	Date	Round	Time	Location	Notes
Loss	25–16	Tom Lawlor	KO (punch)	UFC on Fuel TV: Korean Zombie vs. Poirier	May 15, 2012	1	0:50	Fairfax, Virginia, United States	
Loss	25–15	Alan Belcher	Submission (punches)	UFC Fight Night: Shields vs. Ellenberger	September 17, 2011	1	3:48	New Orleans, Louisiana, United States	
Win	25–14	Ryan Jensen	Submission (triangle choke)	UFC 129	April 30, 2011	1	1:37	Toronto, Ontario, Canada	
Loss	24–14	John Salter	TKO (leg injury)	UFC 113	May 8, 2010	1	2:42	Montreal, Quebec, Canada	
Win	24–13	Matt Horwich	Decision (unanimous)	LGIO MMA 1: MacDonald vs Horwich	April 23, 2010	3	5:00	Edmonton, Alberta, Canada	
Win	23–13	Vernon White	Submission (triangle choke)	W-1 MMA 4: Bad Blood	March 20, 2010	3	2:12	Montreal, Quebec, Canada	
Win	22–13	Solomon Hutcherson	Decision (split)	MFC 23	December 4, 2009	3	5:00	Edmonton, Alberta, Canada	
Loss	21–13	Travis Lutter	Decision (unanimous)	MFC 22	October 2, 2009	3	5:00	Edmonton, Alberta, Canada	
Loss	21–12	Nate Quarry	TKO (elbows)	UFC 97	April 18, 2009	1	2:27	Montreal, Quebec, Canada	
Loss	21–11	Wilson Gouveia	Submission (elbows)	The Ultimate Fighter: Team Nogueira vs. Team Mir Finale	December 13, 2008	1	2:18	Las Vegas, Nevada, United States	
Win	21–10	Jason Lambert	Submission (rear-naked choke)	UFC 88	September 6, 2008	2	1:20	Atlanta, Georgia, United States	Submission of the Night.
Loss	20–10	Demian Maia	Submission (rear-naked choke)	UFC 87	August 9, 2008	3	2:44	Minneapolis, Minnesota, United States	
Win	20–9	Joe Doerksen	TKO (elbows)	UFC 83	April 19, 2008	2	0:54	Montreal, Quebec, Canada	Knockout of the Night.
Loss	19–9	Yushin Okami	Decision (unanimous)	UFC 77	October 20, 2007	3	5:00	Cincinnati, Ohio, United States	
Win	19–8	Rory Singer	TKO (punches and elbows)	UFC 72	June 16, 2007	2	3:18	Belfast, Northern Ireland	
Loss	18–8	Rich Franklin	TKO (corner stoppage)	UFC 68	March 3, 2007	2	5:00	Columbus, Ohio, United States	
Win	18–7	Chris Leben	Submission (guillotine choke)	UFC 66	December 30, 2006	2	4:03	Las Vegas, Nevada, United States	Submission of the Night.
Win	17–7	Ed Herman	Submission (triangle choke)	Ortiz vs. Shamrock 3: The Final Chapter	October 10, 2006	1	2:43	Hollywood, Florida, United States	Submission of the Night.
Win	16–7	Neil Berry	Submission (rear-naked choke)	MFC 10: Unfinished Business	September 8, 2006	1	1:39	Edmonton, Alberta, Canada	
Win	15–7	Fritz Paul	Technical Submission (kimura)	ECC 3: East Coast Warriors	July 22, 2006	1	2:14	Halifax, Nova Scotia, Canada	
Win	14–7	Jerry Spiegel	TKO (punches)	ECC 2: Collision Course	June 30, 2006	2	0:33	Moncton, New Brunswick, Canada	
Win	13–7	Gideon Ray	Decision (unanimous)	Extreme Cage Combat 1	April 29, 2006	3	5:00	Halifax, Nova Scotia, Canada	
Loss	12–7	Patrick Cote	Submission (rear-naked choke)	MFC 9: No Excuses	March 10, 2006	5	1:55	Edmonton, Alberta, Canada	
Loss	12–6	Kalib Starnes	TKO (punches)	National Fighting Challenge 5	November 25, 2005	1	4:37	North Vancouver, British Columbia, Canada	
Win	12–5	Joe Doerksen	Submission (rear-naked choke)	Ultimate Cage Wars 3	October 22, 2005	4	4:37	Winnipeg, Manitoba, Canada	
Win	11–5	Chris Fontaine	Submission (rear naked choke)	MFC 8: Resurrection	September 9, 2005	2	2:12	Edmonton, Alberta, Canada	
Loss	10–5	Shonie Carter	Decision (unanimous)	TKO 21: Collision	July 15, 2005	3	5:00	Montreal, Quebec, Canada	
Loss	10–4	Marvin Eastman	Decision (unanimous)	WEF: Sin City	May 20, 2005	3	5:00	Las Vegas, Nevada, United States	
Loss	10–3	Jason Brilz	Decision (split)	KOTC:: Edmonton	April 16, 2005	2	5:00	Edmonton, Alberta, Canada	
Loss	10–2	Matt Horwich	Submission (armbar)	Extreme Fighting Challenge 3	October 16, 2004	1	N/A	Prince George, British Columbia, Canada	
Win	10–1	Antony Rea	Submission (scarf hold armlock)	Absolute Fighting Championships 8	May 1, 2004	1	2:22	Fort Lauderdale, Florida, United States	Won the vacant AFC Light Heavyweight Championship.
Win	9–1	Ulysses Castro	Submission (rear-naked choke)	Adrenaline Fighting Championships 1	July 24, 2003	2	2:49	Langley, British Columbia, Canada	
Loss	8–1	Bill Mahood	TKO (punches)	MFC 7: Undisputed	May 31, 2003	2	3:02	Slave Lake, Alberta, Canada	
Win	8–0	Jeromie Sills	Submission (triangle choke)	MFC 6: Road To Gold	February 22, 2003	1	1:54	Lethbridge, Alberta, Canada	
Win	7–0	Yan Pellerin	Submission (heel hook)	MFC: Unplugged	November 29, 2002	1	N/A	Edmonton, Alberta, Canada	
Win	6–0	Cameron Brown	Submission (rear-naked choke)	MFC 5: Sweet Redemption	September 21, 2002	2	4:09	Edmonton, Alberta, Canada	
Win	5–0	Shannon Ritch	Submission (rear-naked choke)	MFC 4: New Groundz	June 1, 2002	1	2:45	Calgary, Alberta, Canada	
Win	4–0	Chris Peak	Submission (keylock)	MFC 3: Canadian Pride	March 3, 2002	1	1:54	Grande Prairie, Alberta, Canada	
Win	3–0	Bill Mahood	Technical Submission (guillotine choke)	MFC 2: Rumble at the Jungle	November 24, 2001	3	1:17	Edmonton, Alberta, Canada	
Win	2–0	Shane Biever	Submission (choke)	Northern Lights Out	April 30, 2000	1	N/A	Alberta, Canada	
Win	1–0	Ken Manderson	Submission (armbar)	Punch and Crunch	December 18, 1999	1	N/A	Calgary, Alberta, Canada	
