= Yushin Okami =

Japanese mixed martial arts fighter

- Born: July 21, 1981 (age 45); Kanagawa, Japan
- Native name: 岡見 勇信
- Other names: Thunder
- Height: 6 ft 2 in (1.88 m)
- Weight: 205 lb (93 kg)
- Division: Light Heavyweight; Middleweight; Welterweight
- Reach: 75 in (191 cm)
- Style: Judo, Brazilian Jiu Jitsu
- Stance: Southpaw
- Fighting out of: Kanagawa, Japan
- Team: Wajyutsu Keisyukai; Team Quest
- Rank: Black belt in Judo; Black belt in Brazilian jiu-jitsu
- Years active: 2002–present

Mixed martial arts record
- Total: 54
- Wins: 39
- By knockout: 12
- By submission: 6
- By decision: 20
- By disqualification: 1
- Losses: 15
- By knockout: 7
- By submission: 1
- By decision: 7

Other information
- Mixed martial arts record from Sherdog

Yushin Okami (Japanese: 岡見 勇信, Okami Yūshin; born July 21, 1981) is a Japanese mixed martial artist. A professional competitor since 2002, Okami has competed for the UFC, PRIDE, Pancrase, M-1 Global, World Series of Fighting, DEEP, Professional Fighters League, and ONE Championship. He is regarded as one of the greatest Japanese mixed martial artists in recent history.

== Mixed martial arts career ==
=== Early career ===
As an amateur, Okami fought in the pre-PRIDE 4 tournament, defeating two opponents before submitting Yuuki Tsutsui in the finals via triangle choke to win the tournament. He began his professional career in 2002, fighting in the GCM promotion and Pancrase, as well as making an appearance at Pride FC: The Best, Vol. 3, amassing a professional record of 7–0. In 2003, he competed in the ADCC Submission Wrestling World Championship, but was defeated by Matt Lindland. Also in 2003, he suffered his first professional MMA loss to Amar Suloev.

Okami continued fighting in multiple promotions before arriving at Rumble on the Rock, where he entered a 175 lb tournament. Anderson Silva, Frank Trigg, Carlos Condit, and Jake Shields also competed in the tournament. In the opening round, Okami fought the future UFC Middleweight Champion Anderson Silva. Silva controlled the fight on the feet before Okami secured a takedown. Okami landed a few blows from top position before Silva landed an illegal upkick to Okami's chin while both fighters were grounded, and Silva was in the guard position. Okami's knees were on the ground at the time, making the attack an illegal strike to the head of a downed opponent. Silva later said that the rule had not been properly explained to him before the bout. "When I fought Okami, the rules really weren't explained to me properly in the event I was fighting in," said Silva. "You could kick a downed opponent to the groin or to the head when your back's on the ground. So the rules weren't explained to me properly." Referee Troy Mandaloniz held Silva back and gave the wobbled Okami time to recover. Okami could not recover, and the fight was declared a disqualification victory for Okami. Silva responded by asserting he "felt it was a cheap, cowardly way of winning," and that "people that were there saw that he was in the condition to come back and keep fighting, and he didn't." Moving on to the next round, Okami faced the future EliteXC welterweight and Strikeforce Middleweight Champion Jake Shields, a tournament favorite. Okami lost a hard-fought majority decision to Shields, who went on to win the tournament.

=== Ultimate Fighting Championship ===
==== 2006–2007 ====
By 2006, Okami had amassed a record of 17–3 and was the third-ranked Pancrase Middleweight fighter. He signed with the UFC and made his debut in the organization on the undercard of UFC 62, defeating Alan Belcher by unanimous decision. He followed up less than two months later with a bout against Kalib Starnes at UFC 64. He defeated Starnes by TKO due to strikes in the third round. Okami then signed on to make his third appearance in four months at UFC 66. His original opponent was to be David Terrell, but Terrell withdrew due to an elbow injury and was replaced by Rory Singer. Okami defeated Singer by submission due to strikes late in the third round.

After three victories in the UFC, Okami made his main card and broadcast debut at UFC 69 against Mike Swick, who was riding a five-fight win streak in the UFC at the time. Okami won the bout via unanimous decision. Okami then participated in the 2007 ADCC Submission Wrestling World Championship in the 87 kg (191 lb) division, but lost to eventual division winner Demian Maia. In the UFC, however, Okami was riding a four-fight win streak. In his next bout, he faced former UFC Middleweight Champion Rich Franklin at UFC 72 for the position of the #1 contender in the middleweight division. Franklin controlled the first two rounds, but Okami nearly sunk in a kimura in the third. Ultimately, all three judges scored the bout 29–28 in Franklin's favor.

==== 2008–2009 ====
Okami next faced Jason MacDonald at UFC 77. MacDonald had also defeated Singer and lost to Franklin in his two previous bouts. Though Dana White said that the winner might earn a title shot, the fight was placed on the undercard, possibly due to the fighters' lack of fan support. Okami dominated the fight with superior stand-up, takedown defense, and ground control en route to a unanimous decision victory.

Okami next faced former UFC Middleweight Champion Evan Tanner in Tanner's first fight in two years. The fight occurred at UFC 82 on March 1, 2008, in Columbus, Ohio. After dropping Tanner with a straight left in round 1, Okami landed a knee in the Muay Thai clinch position that knocked out Tanner 3 minutes into round 2.

Okami was scheduled for a rematch with Anderson Silva for the Middleweight Championship at UFC 90, but he was forced to drop out of the bout due to a broken hand. Patrick Côté was chosen to replace him. After his recovery, Okami faced 2003 ADCC Absolute Division gold medalist Dean Lister at UFC 92 and earned a unanimous decision. Lister made frequent attempts to pull guard and take Okami down to the ground, but was not able to secure any submissions. The bout was considered tedious by spectators, but Okami was victorious. Okami was next scheduled to return at UFC 98 against Dan Miller, but suffered a torn ligament and was not able to compete.

Okami was next scheduled to return at UFC 104 against Chael Sonnen. Okami lost to Sonnen via unanimous decision (30–27, 30–27, 30–27). After the fight, Okami trained at Team Quest with Sonnen for one month before returning to Japan. Sonnen stated in an interview

I want to say hello to my brother, Yushin through this interview. I am saddened that he returned to Japan – it feels like I parted with a close friend. Though Yushin lost against me, he came forward and asked to train with me: Is this a Japanese thing? It is admirable that he tried to learn from an opponent who defeated him. While at Team Quest in Portland, he thoroughly handled me during training. I was lucky that I managed to defeat him in our fight. I probably won’t agree to a rematch with him (laughs). The one fighter whom I never want to fight again – that is Yushin Okami.

==== 2010–2011 ====
Okami defeated Lucio Linhares via TKO doctor stoppage at UFC Fight Night 21. In his fight with Linhares, Okami showcased much improved striking skills which led to the stoppage.

On August 1, 2010, Okami defeated Mark Muñoz via split decision in the co-main event at UFC Live on Versus: 2. Okami was able to stuff most of Muñoz's takedowns and kept the fight standing where he showed superior striking, stunning Muñoz in the third round with a straight right counter.

Okami was expected to face Vitor Belfort on November 13, 2010, at UFC 122, with the winner facing Anderson Silva for the UFC Middleweight Championship. Belfort was then pulled from the fight, and Nate Marquardt was tapped to make a quick return to face Okami. Okami was able to control the center of the octagon and dictate the pace of the fight en route to a unanimous decision victory in what was a closely contested bout.

Okami faced Anderson Silva at UFC 134 on August 27, 2011, for the UFC Middleweight Championship. In this match, Okami was rocked badly by a headkick in the first round. In the second round, Okami was dropped by a straight-right and then dropped again this time by a right hook. He was finished and defeated via TKO in the second round.

==== 2012–2013 ====
Okami next faced Tim Boetsch on February 26, 2012, at UFC 144. While Okami dominated the first two rounds, Boetsch claimed one of the biggest upsets of 2012 in Okami's home country in a brutal flurry of uppercuts from the clinch that left Okami losing in a devastating TKO comeback win for Boetsch in the final frame.

Okami was expected to face Luiz Cane on August 11, 2012, at UFC 150. However, Cane was forced out of the bout with an injury and replaced by Rousimar Palhares. Palhares was also injured and replaced by Buddy Roberts. Okami won the fight via TKO in the second round.

A rematch with Alan Belcher took place on December 29, 2012, at UFC 155. Okami won via unanimous decision for the second time.

Okami next faced former Bellator Middleweight Champion Hector Lombard at UFC on Fuel TV: Silva vs. Stann on March 3, 2013. Okami won the bout via split decision.

Okami faced Ronaldo Souza on September 4, 2013, at UFC Fight Night 28. He lost the fight via KO in the first round. Souza came out and rocked Okami, then shoved him in to the cage while throwing flurries of punches. Okami got back to the center of the cage, but Souza quickly hunted him down and unleashed a devastating overhand right dropping Okami. Then, he proceeded to finish the fight with brutal ground and pound.

Despite being ranked as a top 10 Middleweight by most sources, Okami was released by the UFC on September 27, 2013. When asked via Twitter why he released Okami, UFC President Dana White remarked "Our roster is packed." When asked by Yahoo Sports why he was releasing a highly ranked fighter who had won three of his last four bouts, White responded:

He was always a tough guy and was right up there, but it's almost like he'd become a gatekeeper. I like Okami, and you've heard me say this many times, that a win over Yushin Okami meant something ... But he was never able to get over the hump and win one of those [significant] fights. We have a lot of guys coming in and I've been saying this all year: We have a full roster and there are guys who deserve opportunities. When you bring guys in, someone has to go. That's why these fights are so meaningful.

=== World Series of Fighting ===
On October 13, 2013, it was announced that Okami had signed with World Series of Fighting. He made his WSOF debut at WSOF 9, on March 29, 2014, against Svetlozar Savov. He won via arm triangle choke submission in the second round.

In his second fight for the promotion, Okami faced David Branch for the WSOF middleweight championship at WSOF 15 on November 15, 2014. He lost the fight via TKO in the fourth round.

Okami was scheduled to face Ryan Ford in the main event of WSOF 21 on June 5, 2015. However, Ford announced that he had to pull out of the fight with Okami due to an injury. On July 30, 2015, it was announced that Okami would be moving down to the welterweight division and facing Jon Fitch on October 17, 2015, at WSOF 24. Okami lost the fight by unanimous decision.

On September 13, 2016, it was announced that Okami would be facing Paul Bradley on December 31, 2016, at WSOF 34. He won the back-and-forth fight by split decision.

=== Professional Fighters League ===
Once the World Series of Fighting was transformed into the Professional Fighters League, Okami was booked for the new promotion's second fight card. For his first fight with the promotion (technically his fifth fight under the promotion's management), he fought Andre Lobato. After three rounds, Okami defeated Lobato by unanimous decision.

=== Second run in the UFC ===
Okami replaced Maurício Rua against Ovince Saint Preux in a Light Heavyweight bout on September 23, 2017, at UFC Fight Night: Saint Preux vs. Okami. Despite less than a week notice, Okami had stated he was preparing for a potential fight at Middleweight, but jumped on the opportunity for another shot with the UFC. He lost the fight via submission in round one.

Okami faced Dhiego Lima in a welterweight bout on April 14, 2018, at UFC on Fox 29. He won the fight by unanimous decision.

Okami faced Alexey Kunchenko on December 2, 2018, at UFC Fight Night 142. He lost the fight via unanimous decision.

=== ONE Championship ===
On February 20, 2019, it was reported that Okami was signed by ONE Championship. Okami is expected to co-headline ONE Championship: For Honor against Kiamrian Abbasov on May 4, 2019. Okami lost his debut fight via second-round TKO.

He was then set to face James Nakashima at ONE Championship: Dawn Of Heroes on August 2, 2019. Okami lost by unanimous decision.

Okami won his next fight against Agilan Thani by split decision at ONE Championship: Century on October 13, 2019.

Okami was scheduled to make his return against Leandro Ataides at ONE: Heavy Hitters on January 14, 2022. The bout was scrapped for unknown reasons.

After over three years of inactivity, Okami was scheduled to face former ONE Middleweight and Light Heavyweight World Champion Aung La Nsang at ONE on Prime Video 4 on November 19, 2022. However, the bout was postponed to ONE 163 for undisclosed reasons. He lost the fight via technical knockout in the first round.

=== Post ONE ===
Okami faced Kim Jae-young on December 2, 2023, at Shooto: Mobstyles in his first bout after leaving ONE, winning the bout via split decision.

== Championships and accomplishments ==
- Ultimate Fighting Championship
  - UFC.com Awards
    - 2007: Ranked #10 Upset of the Year vs. Mike Swick (Tied with Josh Koscheck)
    - 2010: Ranked #8 Fighter of the Year

== Mixed martial arts record ==
Professional record breakdown
54 matches	39 wins	15 losses
By knockout	15	7
By submission	3	1
By decision	20	7
By disqualification	1	0

Res.	Record	Opponent	Method	Event	Date	Round	Time	Location	Notes
Win	39–15	Kim Jae-young	Decision (unanimous)	Shooto 2024 Vol.8	November 30, 2024	5	5:00	Tokyo, Japan	Won the vacant Shooto Middleweight Championship.
Win	38–15	Kim Jae-young	Decision (split)	Shooto 2023 Vol.8	December 2, 2023	3	5:00	Tokyo, Japan	
Loss	37–15	Aung La Nsang	TKO (punches)	ONE 163	November 19, 2022	1	1:42	Kallang, Singapore	Light Heavyweight bout.
Win	37–14	Agilan Thani	Decision (split)	ONE: Century – Part 1	October 13, 2019	3	5:00	Tokyo, Japan	
Loss	36–14	James Nakashima	Decision (unanimous)	ONE: Dawn of Heroes	August 2, 2019	3	5:00	Pasay, Philippines	
Loss	36–13	Kiamrian Abbasov	TKO (punches)	ONE: For Honor	May 5, 2019	2	1:10	Jakarta, Indonesia	Return to Middleweight.
Loss	36–12	Alexey Kunchenko	Decision (unanimous)	UFC Fight Night: dos Santos vs. Tuivasa	December 2, 2018	3	5:00	Adelaide, Australia	
Win	36–11	Dhiego Lima	Decision (unanimous)	UFC on Fox: Poirier vs. Gaethje	April 14, 2018	3	5:00	Glendale, Arizona, United States	Return to Welterweight.
Loss	35–11	Ovince Saint Preux	Technical Submission (Von Flue choke)	UFC Fight Night: Saint Preux vs. Okami	September 23, 2017	1	1:50	Saitama, Japan	Light Heavyweight bout.
Win	35–10	Andre Lobato	Decision (unanimous)	PFL Everett	July 29, 2017	3	5:00	Everett, Washington, United States	
Win	34–10	Paul Bradley	Decision (split)	WSOF 34	December 31, 2016	3	5:00	New York City, New York, United States	
Win	33–10	Shingo Suzuki	Submission (rear-naked choke)	Pancrase 279	July 24, 2016	1	2:06	Tokyo, Japan	
Win	32–10	Ryuta Sakurai	TKO (corner stoppage)	DEEP 75 Impact: 15th Anniversary	February 27, 2016	2	4:23	Tokyo, Japan	
Loss	31–10	Jon Fitch	Decision (unanimous)	WSOF 24	October 17, 2015	3	5:00	Mashantucket, Connecticut, United States	Return to Welterweight.
Loss	31–9	David Branch	TKO (punches)	WSOF 15	November 15, 2014	4	3:39	Tampa, Florida, United States	For the WSOF Middleweight Championship.
Win	31–8	Svetlozar Savov	Submission (arm-triangle choke)	WSOF 9	March 29, 2014	2	4:46	Las Vegas, Nevada, United States	
Loss	30–8	Ronaldo Souza	TKO (punches)	UFC Fight Night: Teixeira vs. Bader	September 4, 2013	1	2:47	Rio de Janeiro, Brazil	
Win	30–7	Hector Lombard	Decision (split)	UFC on Fuel TV: Silva vs. Stann	March 3, 2013	3	5:00	Saitama, Japan	
Win	29–7	Alan Belcher	Decision (unanimous)	UFC 155	December 29, 2012	3	5:00	Las Vegas, Nevada, United States	
Win	28–7	Buddy Roberts	TKO (punches)	UFC 150	August 11, 2012	2	3:05	Denver, Colorado, United States	
Loss	27–7	Tim Boetsch	KO (punches)	UFC 144	February 26, 2012	3	0:54	Saitama, Japan	
Loss	27–6	Anderson Silva	TKO (punches)	UFC 134	August 27, 2011	2	2:04	Rio de Janeiro, Brazil	For the UFC Middleweight Championship.
Win	27–5	Nate Marquardt	Decision (unanimous)	UFC 122	November 13, 2010	3	5:00	Oberhausen, Germany	UFC Middleweight title eliminator.
Win	26–5	Mark Muñoz	Decision (split)	UFC Live: Jones vs. Matyushenko	August 1, 2010	3	5:00	San Diego, California, United States	
Win	25–5	Lucio Linhares	TKO (doctor stoppage)	UFC Fight Night: Florian vs. Gomi	March 21, 2010	2	2:47	Charlotte, North Carolina, United States	
Loss	24–5	Chael Sonnen	Decision (unanimous)	UFC 104	October 24, 2009	3	5:00	Los Angeles, California, United States	
Win	24–4	Dean Lister	Decision (unanimous)	UFC 92	December 27, 2008	3	5:00	Las Vegas, Nevada, United States	
Win	23–4	Evan Tanner	KO (knee)	UFC 82	March 1, 2008	2	3:00	Columbus, Ohio, United States	UFC Middleweight title eliminator.
Win	22–4	Jason MacDonald	Decision (unanimous)	UFC 77	October 20, 2007	3	5:00	Cincinnati, Ohio, United States	
Loss	21–4	Rich Franklin	Decision (unanimous)	UFC 72	June 16, 2007	3	5:00	Belfast, Northern Ireland	UFC Middleweight title eliminator.
Win	21–3	Mike Swick	Decision (unanimous)	UFC 69	April 7, 2007	3	5:00	Houston, Texas, United States	
Win	20–3	Rory Singer	TKO (punches)	UFC 66	December 30, 2006	3	4:03	Las Vegas, Nevada, United States	
Win	19–3	Kalib Starnes	TKO (punches)	UFC 64	October 14, 2006	3	1:40	Las Vegas, Nevada, United States	
Win	18–3	Alan Belcher	Decision (unanimous)	UFC 62	August 26, 2006	3	5:00	Las Vegas, Nevada, United States	
Win	17–3	Izuru Takeuchi	TKO (punches)	GCM: D.O.G. 6	June 11, 2006	1	3:39	Tokyo, Japan	
Win	16–3	Bang Ji-won	TKO (punches)	MARS: World Grand Prix	May 13, 2006	1	4:38	Chiba, Japan	
Loss	15–3	Jake Shields	Decision (majority)	Rumble on the Rock 9	April 21, 2006	3	5:00	Honolulu, Hawaii, United States	ROTR Middleweight Tournament Second Round.
Win	15–2	Anderson Silva	DQ (illegal kick)	Rumble on the Rock 8	January 20, 2006	1	2:33	Honolulu, Hawaii, United States	ROTR Middleweight Tournament Opening Round.
Win	14–2	Lee Myun-joo	TKO (corner stoppage)	Hero's 2005 in Seoul	November 5, 2005	1	4:14	Seoul, South Korea	Openweight bout.
Win	13–2	Damien Riccio	TKO (punches)	GCM: D.O.G. 3	September 17, 2005	2	2:44	Tokyo, Japan	
Win	12–2	Nick Thompson	TKO (elbow injury)	GCM: D.O.G. 2	June 11, 2005	1	0:29	Tokyo, Japan	
Win	11–2	Brian Foster	Submission (arm-triangle choke)	GCM: D.O.G. 1	March 12, 2005	3	2:53	Tokyo, Japan	
Win	10–2	Eiji Ishikawa	Decision (unanimous)	Pancrase: Brave 9	October 12, 2004	3	5:00	Tokyo, Japan	
Loss	9–2	Falaniko Vitale	Decision (split)	SuperBrawl 36	June 18, 2004	3	5:00	Honolulu, Hawaii, United States	Return to Middleweight.
Win	9–1	Ryuta Sakurai	Decision (unanimous)	PRIDE Bushido 2	February 15, 2004	2	5:00	Yokohama, Japan	Light Heavyweight debut.
Win	8–1	Kousei Kubota	TKO (punches)	GCM: Demolition 13	January 18, 2004	1	1:47	Japan	
Loss	7–1	Amar Suloev	TKO (punches)	M-1 MFC: Russia vs. the World 6	October 10, 2003	1	4:44	Moscow, Russia	
Win	7–0	Kazuhiro Hanada	TKO (punches)	GCM: Demolition 9	July 21, 2003	1	4:47	Yokohama, Japan	
Win	6–0	Hidehiko Hasegawa	Decision (unanimous)	GCM: Demolition 7	May 1, 2003	2	5:00	Tokyo, Japan	
Win	5–0	Hikaru Sato	Decision (unanimous)	Pancrase: Hybrid 1	January 26, 2003	2	5:00	Tokyo, Japan	
Win	4–0	Sen Nakadai	Decision (unanimous)	Pancrase: Spirit 8	November 30, 2002	2	5:00	Yokohama, Japan	Middleweight debut.
Win	3–0	Steve White	TKO (submission to punches)	PRIDE FC: The Best, Vol. 3	October 20, 2002	2	3:25	Tokyo, Japan	
Win	2–0	Kyosuke Sasaki	Decision (unanimous)	GCM: Demolition 1	September 8, 2002	2	5:00	Japan	Welterweight debut.
Win	1–0	Hidehisa Matsuda	TKO (punches)	Pride The Best Volume 2	July 20, 2002	1	3:52	Japan	

== Pay-per-view Bouts ==
No	Event	PPV buys
1.	UFC 72	200,000
2.	UFC 134	335,000

== In popular culture ==
- Okami's likeness was used as an inspiration to design the Titan form of Eren Jaeger from Hajime Isayama's manga/anime series Attack on Titan.
- Okami will supervise MMA sequences in the live-action television drama adaptation of Atsushi Namikiri's Red Blue manga series.

=== Web shows ===
Year	Title	Role	Notes	Ref.
2025	Physical: Asia	Contestant	Netflix	
