= UFC 100 =

UFC mixed martial arts event in 2009

- The poster for UFC 100
- Promotion: Ultimate Fighting Championship
- Date: July 11, 2009
- Venue: Mandalay Bay Events Center
- City: Las Vegas, Nevada
- Attendance: 10,871 (9,764 paid)
- Total gate: $5,101,740
- Buyrate: 1,600,000
- Total purse: $1,790,000

Event chronology
The Ultimate Fighter: United States vs. United Kingdom Finale	UFC 100	UFC 101: Declaration

UFC 100 was a mixed martial arts event produced by the Ultimate Fighting Championship (UFC) on July 11, 2009, in Las Vegas, Nevada.

This event was the most bought UFC pay-per-view of all time with a buyrate of 1.6 million, until UFC 202 broke the record with 1.65 million.

== Background ==
The event included two championship bouts and a fight between the two coaches on the Spike TV show, The Ultimate Fighter.

The main event was a rematch between UFC Heavyweight Champion Brock Lesnar and Interim UFC Heavyweight Champion Frank Mir. This championship unification bout occurred as a result of former UFC Heavyweight Champion Randy Couture's year-long resignation from the promotion. During his absence, the UFC created an Interim championship, which Antônio Rodrigo Nogueira won by defeating Tim Sylvia. Nogueira and Mir were opposing coaches on The Ultimate Fighter: Team Nogueira vs Team Mir, and fought for the interim championship at UFC 92. During the airing of the television program, Couture returned to the company and UFC President Dana White announced he would defend the title against Lesnar at UFC 91. The winners of the Couture vs Lesnar and Nogueira vs Mir matches would fight for the undisputed title. In his fourth professional fight, Lesnar defeated Couture via technical knockout to become the UFC Heavyweight Champion. Mir was crowned interim champion after becoming the first fighter to finish Nogueira. The match between Lesnar and Mir was set for UFC 98. However, Mir injured his knee while training, and withdrew from the bout. The next day, it was announced the fight would be moved to UFC 100. Lesnar and Mir had fought once before, at UFC 81 (Lesnar's UFC debut); Mir won via kneebar submission.

The co-main event featured Georges St-Pierre, defending the Welterweight Championship against Thiago Alves. Alves entered the fight after consecutive victories over three top UFC welterweights: Josh Koscheck, Matt Hughes and Karo Parisyan. St-Pierre had previously defended the title against Jon Fitch and UFC Lightweight Champion B.J. Penn.

The third match on the main card was between top middleweight contenders Dan Henderson and Michael Bisping. The two were opposing coaches on the ninth season of The Ultimate Fighter (Henderson on Team USA and Bisping on Team UK). Bisping had a professional MMA record of 17–1, and was undefeated since moving to middleweight. He entered the bout following wins over Charles McCarthy, Jason Day and Chris Leben. On June 2, it was announced the winner of the fight would get a shot at UFC Middleweight Champion Anderson Silva.

A preliminary match-up between Dong Hyun Kim and Jonathan Goulet was scheduled for the card, but Goulet withdrew due to a shoulder injury, and was replaced by T. J. Grant.

K-1 HERO'S Light Heavyweight Champion Yoshihiro Akiyama made his UFC debut against Alan Belcher.

This event was Sherdog's 2009 Event of the Year.

== Results ==
Main card
Weight class				Method	Round	Time	Notes
Heavyweight	Brock Lesnar (c)	def.	Frank Mir (ic)	TKO (punches)	2	1:48	(Note: For the UFC Heavyweight Championship.)
Welterweight	Georges St-Pierre (c)	def.	Thiago Alves	Decision (unanimous) (50–45, 50–44, 50–45)	5	5:00	(Note: For the UFC Welterweight Championship.)
Middleweight	Dan Henderson	def.	Michael Bisping	KO (punch)	2	3:20	(Note: Coaches' fight for season 9 of the Ultimate Fighter)
Welterweight	Jon Fitch	def.	Paulo Thiago	Decision (unanimous) (30–27, 29–28, 29–28)	3	5:00	(Note: This fight was delayed until after the main event)
Middleweight	Yoshihiro Akiyama	def.	Alan Belcher	Decision (split) (30–27, 28–29, 29–28)	3	5:00
Preliminary card
Weight class				Method	Round	Time	Notes
Light Heavyweight	Mark Coleman	def.	Stephan Bonnar	Decision (unanimous) (29–28, 29–28, 29–28)	3	5:00
Light Heavyweight	Jon Jones	def.	Jake O'Brien	Submission (guillotine choke)	2	2:43
Lightweight	Jim Miller	def.	Mac Danzig	Decision (unanimous) (30–27, 30–27, 30–27)	3	5:00
Welterweight	Dong Hyun Kim	def.	T. J. Grant	Decision (unanimous) (30–26, 30–26, 30–26)	3	5:00
Middleweight	Tom Lawlor	def.	C. B. Dollaway	Technical submission (guillotine choke)	1	0:55
Lightweight	Shannon Gugerty	def.	Matt Grice	Submission (guillotine choke)	1	2:36

== Bonus awards ==
The following fighters received $100,000 bonuses.

- Fight of the Night: Yoshihiro Akiyama vs. Alan Belcher
- Knockout of the Night: Dan Henderson
- Submission of the Night: Tom Lawlor

== Reported payout ==
The following is the reported payout to the fighters as reported to the Nevada State Athletic Commission. It does not include sponsor money or "locker room" bonuses often given by the UFC.

- Brock Lesnar: $400,000 (no win bonus) def. Frank Mir: $45,000
- Georges St-Pierre: $400,000 ($200,000 win bonus) def. Thiago Alves: $60,000
- Jon Fitch: $90,000 (includes $45,000 win bonus) def. Paulo Thiago: $8,000
- Dan Henderson: $250,000 ($150,000 win bonus) def. Michael Bisping: $150,000
- Yoshihiro Akiyama: $60,000 ($20,000 win bonus) def. Alan Belcher: $19,000
- Mark Coleman: $100,000 ($50,000 win bonus) def. Stephan Bonnar: $25,000
- Jim Miller: $22,000 ($11,000 win bonus) def. Mac Danzig: $20,000
- Jon Jones: $18,000 ($9,000 win bonus) def. Jake O'Brien: $13,000
- Dong Hyun Kim: $58,000 ($29,000 win bonus) def. T.J. Grant: $5,000
- Tom Lawlor: $16,000 ($8,000 win bonus) def. C.B. Dollaway: $14,000
- Shannon Gugerty: $10,000 ($5,000 win bonus) def. Matt Grice: $7,000

== See also ==
- Ultimate Fighting Championship
- List of UFC champions
- List of UFC events
- 2009 in UFC
