= UFC 83 =

UFC mixed martial arts event in 2008

UFC 83: Serra vs. St-Pierre 2
- The poster for UFC 83: Serra vs. St-Pierre 2
- Promotion: Ultimate Fighting Championship
- Date: April 19, 2008
- Venue: Bell Centre
- City: Montreal, Quebec, Canada
- Attendance: 21,390
- Total gate: $5,100,000
- Buyrate: 530,000

Event chronology
UFC Fight Night: Florian vs. Lauzon	UFC 83: Serra vs. St-Pierre 2	UFC 84: Ill Will

UFC 83: Serra vs. St-Pierre 2 was a mixed martial arts event held by the Ultimate Fighting Championship. The event was held on April 19, 2008, at the Bell Centre in Montreal, Quebec, Canada.

== Background ==
The event on this date was originally scheduled to be called UFC 84, but following the cancellation of a tentatively scheduled March 8, 2008 event in England, the event's title was changed to UFC 83 instead.

The card was headlined by UFC Welterweight Champion Matt Serra and UFC Interim Welterweight Champion Georges St-Pierre in a match to unify the championship. It was a rematch from their fight at UFC 69, which Serra had won. The two fighters exchanged harsh words through the media following that fight, which led to the circumstances that surrounded the rematch. St-Pierre cited personal issues for the loss. He said that his father was seriously ill, and that his 17-year-old cousin had died in a car accident around the time of the first fight. St-Pierre then claimed that he only accepted the fight with Serra because he thought he could "easily beat this guy." Serra took exception to these comments and responded in a subsequent radio interview by calling St-Pierre a "Frenchy", telling him to "go drink some red wine and go watch a hockey game."

This event was the company's first event in Canada. Several prominent Canadian MMA fighters competed on this card, including Kalib Starnes, Mark Bocek, Jason MacDonald, Sam Stout, and Jonathan Goulet. Patrick Côté was originally scheduled to fight on this card as well against Alan Belcher, but was forced to pull out after sustaining a non-fighting related injury and replaced by Jason Day.

At the time, UFC 83 officially broke two UFC records. The first record broken was the fastest sellout ever. The UFC sold most of the tickets to UFC Fight Club members in the first 24 hours of the fightclub presale. The rest of the tickets were sold within one minute of the public sale. The second record broken was the UFC attendance record. The 21,390 people who packed the Bell Centre officially broke the former attendance record of 19,049 set at UFC 68 in Columbus, Ohio back in March 2007.

This event marked the promotional debut of future UFC Heavyweight Champion, Cain Velasquez.

== Results ==
Main card (PPV)
Weight class				Method	Round	Time	Notes
Welterweight	Georges St-Pierre (ic)	def.	Matt Serra (c)	TKO (knees)	2	4:45	(Note: For the UFC Welterweight Championship)
Middleweight	Rich Franklin	def.	Travis Lutter	TKO (punches)	2	3:01
Middleweight	Nate Quarry	def.	Kalib Starnes	Decision (unanimous) (30–26, 30–27, 30–24)	3	5:00
Middleweight	Michael Bisping	def.	Charles McCarthy	TKO (injury)	1	5:00
Lightweight	Mac Danzig	def.	Mark Bocek	Submission (rear-naked choke)	3	3:48
Preliminary card
Middleweight	Jason Day	def.	Alan Belcher	TKO (punches)	1	3:58
Middleweight	Jason MacDonald	def.	Joe Doerksen	TKO (elbows)	2	0:56
Middleweight	Demian Maia	def.	Ed Herman	Technical Submission (mounted triangle choke)	2	2:27
Lightweight	Rich Clementi	def.	Sam Stout	Decision (split) (29–27, 28–29, 29–28)	3	5:00
Heavyweight	Cain Velasquez	def.	Brad Morris	TKO (punches)	1	2:10
Welterweight	Jonathan Goulet	def.	Kuniyoshi Hironaka	TKO (punches)	2	2:07

== Bonus awards ==
The following fighters received $75,000 bonuses.

- Fight of the Night: Jonathan Goulet vs. Kuniyoshi Hironaka
- Knockout of the Night: Jason MacDonald
- Submission of the Night: Demian Maia

== Fighter payouts ==
The Quebec Boxing Council refused to disclose payout details, as it is common for non-US held pay-per-view events.

== See also ==
- Ultimate Fighting Championship
- List of UFC champions
- List of UFC events
- 2008 in UFC
