= Kalib Starnes =

Canadian mixed martial arts fighter

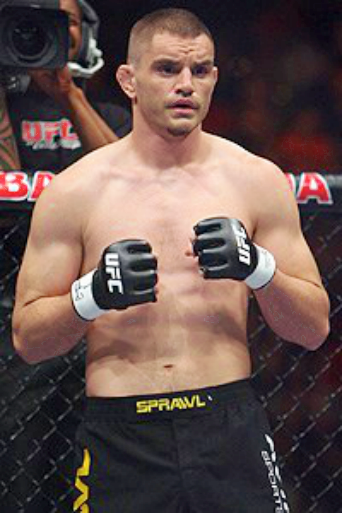
- Born: Kalib Axel Starnes; January 6, 1975 (age 51); Surrey, British Columbia, Canada
- Nationality: Canadian
- Height: 6 ft 3 in (191 cm)
- Weight: 205 lb (93 kg; 14 st 9 lb)
- Division: Middleweight; Light heavyweight Heavyweight
- Reach: 74 in (187 cm)
- Style: Gracie Jiu-Jitsu, Muay Thai, Boxing, Greco Roman Wrestling, Judo, Taekwondo, Running
- Stance: Orthodox
- Fighting out of: Surrey, British Columbia, Canada
- Team: Aegis Athletics; American Top Team; Revolution Martial Arts; Brazilian Top Team Canada,
- Rank: Black Belt in Gracie Jiu-Jitsu; Red Belt in Taekwondo; Brown Belt in Judo; White Belt in Aikido
- Years active: 1998–present

Mixed martial arts record
- Total: 29
- Wins: 17
- By knockout: 5
- By submission: 10
- By decision: 2
- Losses: 11
- By knockout: 4
- By submission: 2
- By decision: 5
- Draws: 1

Other information
- Mixed martial arts record from Sherdog

Kalib Starnes (born January 6, 1975) is a Canadian mixed martial artist.

== Early life ==
Starnes became involved in the martial arts at an early age and began teaching when he was a teenager. He started training in Gracie Jiu-Jitsu at the Gracie Academy in 1994 in Torrance, California. Starnes has also practiced Muay Thai, Boxing, Judo, Aikido, Kung Fu, Taekwondo, Greco Roman Wrestling, Shotokan and Wado Ryu Karate.

== Mixed martial arts career ==
=== Ultimate Fighting Championship ===
Starnes made his UFC debut on June 24, 2006 at the finale of The Ultimate Fighter 3, winning via rear naked choke over Danny Abbadi.

After this Starnes would gain the biggest victory in his career, by defeating Chris Leben on May 26, 2007 at UFC 71 via unanimous decision, also winning the Fight of The Night bonus for his efforts.

During the UFC 64 event, Starnes suffered a third-round TKO to Yushin Okami.

In his final UFC bout, he lost via unanimous decision to Nate Quarry at UFC 83 in Montreal Canada. Starnes was criticized by MMA pundits and fans for avoiding Quarry for the majority of the match, leading to a new nickname, "The Running Man." Many speculate that his poor performance in this fight was one of the main reasons he was released by the UFC.

== Championships and accomplishments ==
- Ultimate Fighting Championship
  - Fight of the Night (One time) vs. Chris Leben
- Armageddon Fighting Championship
  - AFC Middleweight Champion (One time)
  - Fight of the Night (One time)
- Destiny MMA
  - Destiny MMA Light Heavyweight Championship (One time)

== Mixed martial arts record ==
Professional record breakdown
29 matches	17 wins	11 losses
By knockout	5	4
By submission	10	2
By decision	2	5
Draws	1	

Res.	Record	Opponent	Method	Event	Date	Round	Time	Location	Notes
Loss	17–11–1	Tim Hague	TKO (leg kick)	XFFC 9: Conviction	April 15, 2016	4	0:13	Grande Prairie, Alberta, Canada	Lost the XFFC Heavyweight Championship.
Win	17–10–1	Craig Hudson	Submission (rear-naked choke)	XFFC 7: Bad Blood	October 9, 2015	2	4:31	Grande Prairie, Alberta, Canada	Won the vacant XFFC Heavyweight Championship.
Loss	16–10–1	Rodney Wallace	Decision (split)	HKFC: Hard Knocks 44	June 26, 2015	3	5:00	Calgary, Alberta, Canada	
Loss	16–9–1	Dave Herman	Decision (unanimous)	Titan FC 28: Brilz vs. Davis	May 16, 2014	3	5:00	Newkirk, Oklahoma, United States	
Win	16–8–1	Dwayne Lewis	KO (elbow)	WSOF 7	December 7, 2013	2	1:02	Vancouver, British Columbia, Canada	
Win	15–8–1	Clay Davidson	TKO (punches)	Fivestar Fight League 8: Barefoot Beach Battle	August 9, 2013	1	1:21	Penticton, British Columbia, Canada	
Win	14–8–1	Tim Hague	Decision (unanimous)	AFC 19: Undisputed	July 5, 2013	3	5:00	Edmonton, Alberta, Canada	Heavyweight bout.
Win	13–8–1	David Perron	TKO (punches)	AFC 18: Mayhem	May 19, 2013	2	4:05	Victoria, British Columbia, Canada	
Loss	12–8–1	Joe Doerksen	Decision (unanimous)	AFC 11: Takeover	September 15, 2012	3	5:00	Winnipeg, Manitoba, Canada	Fight of the Night.
Loss	12–7–1	John Salter	KO (punches)	AFC 6: Conviction	June 18, 2011	2	4:13	Victoria, British Columbia, Canada	
Loss	12–6–1	Patrick Côté	Decision (unanimous)	Ringside 10: Cote vs. Starnes	April 9, 2011	3	5:00	Montreal, Quebec, Canada	
Win	12–5–1	Matt MacGrath	Submission (rear-naked choke)	Wreck MMA: Strong and Proud	January 28, 2011	2	3:14	Gatineau, Quebec, Canada	
Win	11–5–1	Nick Hinchliffe	Submission (armbar)	AFC 3: Evolution	July 17, 2010	1	3:49	Victoria, British Columbia, Canada	Won the AFC Middleweight Championship.
Loss	10–5–1	Falaniko Vitale	Submission (ezekiel choke)	X-1 – Champions 2	March 20, 2010	1	2:22	Hawaii, United States	For the X-1 Middleweight Championship.
Win	10–4–1	Marcus Hicks	Submission (rear-naked choke)	AFC 2: Aftershock	March 6, 2010	1	1:22	Victoria, British Columbia, Canada	
Loss	9–4–1	Hector Lombard	Submission (punches)	Cage Fighting Championships 11	November 20, 2009	1	1:55	Sydney, Australia	For the CFC Middleweight Championship.
Win	9–3–1	Chris Cisneros	Submission (armbar)	Destiny MMA: Pier Fighter 1	November 15, 2008	2	4:47	Honolulu, Hawaii, United States	Won the Destiny MMA Light Heavyweight Championship.
Loss	8–3–1	Nate Quarry	Decision (unanimous)	UFC 83	April 19, 2008	3	5:00	Montreal, Quebec, Canada	
Loss	8–2–1	Alan Belcher	TKO (doctor stoppage)	UFC 77	October 20, 2007	2	1:39	Cincinnati, Ohio, United States	
Win	8–1–1	Chris Leben	Decision (unanimous)	UFC 71	May 26, 2007	3	5:00	Las Vegas, Nevada, United States	
Loss	7–1–1	Yushin Okami	TKO (punches)	UFC 64: Unstoppable	October 14, 2006	3	1:40	Las Vegas, Nevada, United States	
Win	7–0–1	Danny Abbadi	Submission (rear-naked choke)	The Ultimate Fighter: Team Ortiz vs. Team Shamrock Finale	June 24, 2006	1	2:56	Las Vegas, Nevada, United States	
Win	6–0–1	Jason MacDonald	TKO (punches)	National Fighting Challenge 5	November 25, 2005	1	4:37	North Vancouver, British Columbia, Canada	
Win	5–0–1	Mike Yackulic	TKO (submission to punches)	World Freestyle Fighting 9: Wild West	September 17, 2005	1	2:21	Vancouver, British Columbia, Canada	
Win	4–0–1	Jason Zazelenchuk	Submission (rear-naked choke)	National Fighting Challenge 3	May 13, 2005	1	0:42	Vancouver, British Columbia, Canada	
Win	3–0–1	Gerry Elliot	Submission (arm-triangle choke)	World Freestyle Fighting 8: Dominance	March 26, 2005	1	N/A	Vancouver, British Columbia, Canada	
Win	2–0–1	Ramin Astaseare	TKO (punches)	National Fighting Challenge 2	February 18, 2005	1	1:49	Vancouver, British Columbia, Canada	
Win	1–0–1	Wayne Atkinson	Submission (rear-naked choke)	Adrenaline Fighting Championships 1	July 24, 2003	1	2:22	Langley, British Columbia, Canada	
Draw	0–0–1	Leonard Carter	Draw	Ultimate Warrior Challenge	August 2, 1998	1	N/A	Vancouver, British Columbia, Canada	

=== Mixed martial arts exhibition record ===
Exhibition record breakdown		
2 matches	1 win	1 loss
By knockout	1	0
By submission	0	1

Res.	Record	Opponent	Method	Event	Date	Round	Time	Location	Notes
Loss	1–1	Kendall Grove	Verbal submission (rib injury)	The Ultimate Fighter 3		3	0:30	Las Vegas, Nevada, United States	Semi-finals.
Win	1–0	Mike Stine	KO (punches)	The Ultimate Fighter 3		1	2:09	Las Vegas, Nevada, United States	Elimination bout.

== See also ==
- List of male mixed martial artists
- List of Canadian UFC fighters
