= 2006 in Maximum Fighting Championship =

Information
- First date: March 10, 2006
- Last date: November 10, 2006

Events
- Total events: 3

Fights
- Total fights: 30
- Title fights: 2

Chronology
2005 in MFC	2006 in Maximum Fighting Championship	2007 in MFC

The year 2006 is the 5th year in the history of the Maximum Fighting Championship, a mixed martial arts promotion based in Canada. In 2006 Maximum Fighting Championship held 3 events beginning with, MFC 9: No Excuses.

== Title fights ==
Title fights in 2006
Weight class				Method	Round	Time	Event	Notes
Middleweight	Patrick Cote	def.	Jason Macdonald	Submission (Rear-Naked Choke)	5	1:55	MFC 9: No Excuses	(Note: For the MFC Middleweight Championship)
Light Heavyweight	Victor Valimaki	def.	Jason Day	Submission (Rear-Naked Choke)	1	2:15	MFC 10: Unfinished Business	(Note: For the MFC Light Heavyweight Championship)

== Events list ==
#	Event title	Date	Arena	Location	Attendance
12	MFC: Unplugged 2	November 10, 2006	Shaw Conference Centre	Edmonton, Alberta	
11	MFC 10: Unfinished Business	September 8, 2006	Shaw Conference Centre	Edmonton, Alberta	
10	MFC 9: No Excuses	March 10, 2006	Shaw Conference Centre	Edmonton, Alberta	

== MFC 9: No Excuses ==
MFC 9: No Excuses was an event held on March 10, 2006 at the Shaw Conference Centre in Edmonton, Alberta, Canada.

=== Results ===
Main Card
Weight class				Method	Round	Time	Notes
Middleweight	Patrick Cote	def.	Jason Macdonald	Submission (Rear-Naked Choke)	5	1:55	(Note: MFC 9: No Excuses)
	Mike Maurer	def.	Darren Appels	TKO (Punches)	1	N/A
	Jarid Bussemakers	def.	Kevin Dolan	Submission (Punches)	1	N/A
	Graydon Tannas	def.	Nick Perry	Submission (Rear-Naked Choke)	2	0:57
	Jason Day	def.	Yoosef Penny	Submission (Rear-Naked Choke)	1	1:00
	Mike Bell	def.	Josh Machan	TKO (Punches)	1	3:37
	Tim Tamaki	def.	Paul Forde	Decision (Unanimous)	3	5:00
	Ryan Machan	def.	Kent Brown	Submission (Triangle Choke)	3	1:13
	Josh Kyrejto	def.	Corey Knapp	Submission (Guillotine Choke)	1	2:49
	Neil Berry	def.	Kyle Cheyne	Submission (Rear-Naked Choke)	1	1:11

== MFC 10: Unfinished Business ==
MFC 10: Unfinished Business was an event held on September 8, 2006 at the Shaw Conference Centre in Edmonton, Alberta, Canada.

=== Results ===
Main Card
Weight class				Method	Round	Time	Notes
Light Heavyweight	Victor Valimaki	def.	Jason Day	Submission (Rear-Naked Choke)	1	2:15	(Note: For the MFC Light Heavyweight Championship)
	Jason MacDonald	def.	Neil Berry	Submission (Rear-Naked Choke)	1	1:39
	Fabio Holanda	def.	Mike Bell	Submission (Armbar)	1	2:39
	Jeff Montemurro	def.	Keath Weafer	TKO (Punches)	1	2:37
	Chad Hamzeh	def.	Tim Tamaki	Submission (Armbar)	1	2:32
	Brian Constant	def.	Nick Perry	KO (Punches)	1	2:06
	Ryan McGillivray	def.	Dave Pogson	Submission (Rear-Naked Choke)	1	1:41
	Dan Chambers	def.	Darren Appels	TKO (Punches)	1	1:00
	Garrett Curran	def.	Paul Boyd	Submission (Armbar)	1	1:58
	Joshua Fletcher	def.	Kent Brown	Submission (Rear-Naked Choke)	1	4:24
	Josh Kyrejto	def.	Corey Knapp	Submission (Guillotine Choke)	1	1:25

== MFC: Unplugged 2 ==
MFC: Unplugged 2 was an event held on November 10, 2006 at the Crowne Plaza Edmonton in Edmonton, Alberta, Canada.

=== Results ===
Main Card
Weight class				Method	Round	Time	Notes
	Jason Day	def.	Shawn Marchand	TKO (Punches)	1	1:54
	Graydon Tannas	def.	Mike Bell	Submission (Rear-Naked Choke)	1	3:05
	Kyle Dillman	def.	Curtis Poulin	TKO (Punches)	2	0:30
	Ryan McGillivray	def.	Joe Kennedy	Submission (Armbar)	3	1:30
	Dan Chambers	def.	Nick Perry	TKO (Punches)	1	3:04
	Ryan Machan	def.	Kevin Olson	Submission (Rear-Naked Choke)	2	1:16
	Adam Farr	def.	Tim Blanchard	TKO (Punches)	2	3:53
	Paul Boyd	def.	Josh Machan	TKO (Punches)	1	1:27
	Chase Holthe	def.	Corey Knapp	Submission (Guillotine Choke)	1	0:33

== See also ==
- List of Maximum Fighting Championship events
