= Alan Belcher =

American mixed martial artist

- Born: April 24, 1984 (age 42); Jonesboro, Arkansas, United States
- Other names: The Talent
- Height: 6 ft 2 in (188 cm)
- Weight: 233 lb (106 kg; 16 st 9 lb)
- Division: Heavyweight (2005); Light Heavyweight (2005–2006, 2007); Middleweight (2006–2013)
- Reach: 75 in (191 cm)
- Fighting out of: Biloxi, Mississippi, United States
- Team: Roufusport (2007–2015); Remix MMA / American Top Team D'Iberville
- Trainer: Duke Roufus, Gokor Chivichyan
- Rank: Black belt in Brazilian Jiu-Jitsu under Helio Moreira; 1st degree black belt in Tae Kwon Do; Black belt in Duke Roufus Kickboxing; Black belt in Hayastan Grappling; Black belt in Judo
- Years active: 2004–2015 (MMA); 2021–present (boxing, bare-knuckle boxing)

Professional boxing record
- Total: 5
- Wins: 5
- By knockout: 5

Mixed martial arts record
- Total: 28
- Wins: 19
- By knockout: 11
- By submission: 5
- By decision: 3
- Losses: 9
- By knockout: 3
- By submission: 1
- By decision: 5

Other information
- Boxing record from BoxRec
- Mixed martial arts record from Sherdog

Alan Belcher (born April 24, 1984) is an American bare-knuckle boxer and former mixed martial artist. A professional from 2004 until 2015, he is perhaps best known for his 15-fight tenure with the UFC. He currently competes in Bare Knuckle Fighting Championship where he was the BKFC Heavyweight Champion.

== Background ==
Belcher was born in Jonesboro, Arkansas and began practicing karate when he was eight years old. After starting Brazilian jiu-jitsu at the age of 14, Belcher began his amateur mixed martial arts career at the age of 15.

Belcher graduated from Sloan-Hendrix High School in Imboden, Arkansas where he competed in baseball and basketball, before continuing his baseball career at Dyersburg State Community College. After two semesters, he dropped out in pursuit of a career in mixed martial arts.

== Mixed martial arts career ==
=== Early career ===
Belcher made his professional debut in July 2004 against Tim Ellis in Freestyle Fighting Championship and won by TKO. His MMA career then picked up significantly in early 2006, the year in which Belcher amassed 9 fights, going 8–1.

=== Ultimate Fighting Championship ===
In 2006 he lost a unanimous decision at the hands of Yushin Okami at UFC 62 in his UFC debut.

Belcher made his second UFC appearance against Jorge Santiago three months later at UFC Fight Night: Sanchez vs. Riggs, winning by stunning head kick knockout in the third round of a close fight.

At UFC 69, Belcher lost to The Ultimate Fighter 3 winner Kendall Grove via D'arce choke.

One month later, Belcher stepped in on short notice to replace injured Eric Schafer against Sean Salmon at UFC 71 on May 26, 2007. Belcher won the bout via guillotine choke 53 seconds into the first round. Following the bout, Belcher signed a new four-fight contract with the UFC.

Belcher then faced Kalib Starnes at UFC 77 on October 20, 2007. After controlling the fight with punches and knees from the clinch, the fight was eventually stopped in favor of Belcher due to a large gash over Starnes' right eye.

Belcher was scheduled to fight at UFC 81 against Ricardo Almeida, but Belcher had to pull out two days before the fight due to a severe case of bronchitis and was replaced by Rob Yundt.

Belcher was scheduled to fight Patrick Côté at UFC 83 in Montreal, but Côté withdrew due to a knee injury and was replaced by Jason Day. Belcher eventually was caught by a punch causing Day to swarm punches at Belcher against the fence. The fight was ruled a TKO in favor of Day in the first round.

After a controversial split decision victory over Ed Herman, Belcher fought Pride FC veteran Denis Kang at UFC 93. Kang won the first round after taking down and controlling Belcher on the ground. However, Kang began to fight more and more conservatively, and when he tried to take Belcher down again late in the second round, Belcher caught him in a tight guillotine choke that made Kang almost immediately tap out, winning him a $40,000 Submission of the Night bonus.

Belcher lost a split decision to Yoshihiro Akiyama, at UFC 100 on July 11, 2009. The fight earned Fight of the Night honors, rewarding both fighters with a record setting $100,000.

Belcher defeated Wilson Gouveia via first round TKO on December 12, 2009, at UFC 107. During the fight, Belcher displayed a good chin and precise punches. The fight was awarded Fight of the Night which rewarded both fighters with $65,000.

Belcher defeated Patrick Côté on May 8, 2010, at UFC 113 by way of rear naked choke after a controversial face plant that rocked Cote and enabled Belcher to sneak around to the back and sink in the choke. Belcher received an extra $65,000 for winning the Submission of the Night award which was his fourth consecutive fight night bonus.

Belcher was expected to face Demian Maia on September 15, 2010, at UFC Fight Night: Maia vs. Belcher in his first main event. However, on August 1, 2010, Belcher withdrew from the fight with Maia after undergoing emergency eye surgery. Alan stated on his Twitter account that he started to lose the vision in his right eye whilst in Brazil.

Belcher's manager, Malki Kawa, in April updated his recovery, saying that Belcher was back in training and looking forward to a return to the Octagon in September.

Belcher faced Jason MacDonald on September 17, 2011, at UFC Fight Night 25. Belcher stuffed a takedown from MacDonald and ended up on top early in the first round. Belcher quickly postured up and began landing punches and elbows to open Jason's guard. He then passed and continued to punish MacDonald and won the fight via verbal submission due to strikes in the first round.

Belcher next faced Rousimar Palhares on May 5, 2012, at UFC on Fox 3. Despite getting the fight to the ground, Palhares was unable to complete his attempted leg locks and heel hook submissions, and Belcher even attempted a few submissions of his own. Belcher would go on to defeat Palhares via TKO in the first round.

Belcher was expected to face Vitor Belfort on October 13, 2012, at UFC 153. However, Belfort was pulled from the bout to face Jon Jones on September 22, 2012, at UFC 152. Belcher called the collapse of the UFC 151 a "blessing in disguise" as he would have been unable to compete due to a fractured spine, keeping him out of action until November. He wanted to face Chris Weidman in his return fight.

A rematch with Yushin Okami took place on December 29, 2012, at UFC 155. Belcher lost the bout by unanimous decision.

Belcher faced Michael Bisping on April 27, 2013, at UFC 159. Bisping controlled the majority of the fight due to his conditioning and cardio pushing a constant pace. The bout was stopped at 4:29 of round 3 as Bisping inadvertently poked Belcher in the eye, rendering Belcher unable to continue. Bisping won the bout via technical unanimous decision. Belcher got eight stitches in his eyelid after the fight.

On November 11, 2015, Belcher announced his retirement from mixed martial arts. A few years afterwards, Belcher negotiated a release from his prevailing UFC contract.

=== Return from retirement ===
Belcher was set to return from retirement to face Marcus Sursa at Empire FC 5 on February 29, 2020, but the bout never materialized for unknown reasons.

=== Gamebred Bareknuckle MMA ===
Belcher faced The Ultimate Fighter: Heavyweights tournament winner Roy Nelson at Gamebred Bareknuckle MMA 6 on November 10, 2023. He won the fight via split decision.

Belcher faced former UFC Heavyweight Champion Junior dos Santos in the main event of Gamebred Bareknuckle MMA 7 for the inaugural Bareknuckle MMA Heavyweight Championship on March 2, 2024. Belcher lost by knockout in the second round.

=== Global Fight League ===
On December 11, 2024, it was announced that Belcher was signed by Global Fight League.

Belcher was scheduled to face Stuart Austin on May 25, 2025 at GFL 2. However, all GFL events were cancelled indefinitely.

=== Karate Combat ===
Belcher competed in the 8-man heavyweight tournament July 18, 2025 at Karate Combat 55 and lost to Zac Pauga by technical knockout in the first round.

== Bare-knuckle boxing ==
On May 20, 2021 – over five years removed from his MMA retirement and nursing the eye injury – it was announced that Belcher had signed a multi-fight contract with Bare Knuckle Fighting Championship.

Belcher made his debut against Tony Lopez on August 20, 2021, at BKFC 20. He won the fight by unanimous decision.

He made his sophomore appearance in the sport against Bobo O'Bannon at BKFC Fight Night 5 on January 29, 2022. He won the bout via first-round knockout. This fight earned him the Knockout of the Night award.

He then faced Frank Tate at BKFC Fight Night 9 on June 11, 2022. He won the bout via first-round knockout. This fight earned him another Knockout of the Night award.

=== BKFC Heavyweight Championship reign ===
Racking three straight wins in the division, Belcher challenged the reigning champion Arnold Adams for the BKFC Heavyweight Championship at BKFC 36 on February 24, 2023. He claimed the title via third-round knockout. After Belcher booked his professional boxing bout against Chase DeMoor, he was stripped of his BKFC Heavyweight title but still continues to be a part of the organization's roster.

== Boxing career ==
=== Belcher vs. DeMoor ===
Belcher was originally scheduled to face professional boxer Hasim Rahman Jr. on the undercard of MF & DAZN: X Series 008 on July 22, 2023 at the Nashville Municipal Auditorium in Nashville, Tennessee. However, due to an injury, Rahman withdrew leaving Detrailous "Teddy" Webster as a late replacement. Webster failed his medicals thus resulting in reality television star, Chase DeMoor, stepping in as a replacement for an exhibition bout. On the night, Belcher defeated DeMoor via 3rd round TKO.

== Personal life ==
Belcher has a daughter and a son from a previous marriage. He currently trains an American Top Team MMA Gym located in D'Iberville, Mississippi.

== Championships and accomplishments ==
=== Bare-knuckle boxing ===
- Bare Knuckle Fighting Championship
  - BKFC Heavyweight Champion (One time; former)
  - Knockout of the Night (Two times) vs. Bobo O'Bannon and Frank Tate

=== Mixed martial arts ===
- Ultimate Fighting Championship
  - Fight of the Night (Two times) vs. Yoshihiro Akiyama and Wilson Gouveia
  - Submission of the Night (Two times) vs. Denis Kang and Patrick Cote
  - UFC Encyclopedia Awards
    - Knockout of the Night (One time) vs. Jorge Santiago
  - UFC.com Awards
    - 2006: Ranked #10 Knockout of the Year vs. Jorge Santiago (Tied with Keith Jardine)
    - 2009: Ranked #8 Submission of the Year vs. Denis Kang, Ranked #10 Loss of the Year vs. Yoshihiro Akiyama & Ranked #6 Fight of the Year vs. Yoshihiro Akiyama

== Mixed martial arts record ==
Professional record breakdown
28 matches	19 wins	9 losses
By knockout	11	3
By submission	5	1
By decision	3	5

Res.	Record	Opponent	Method	Event	Date	Round	Time	Location	Notes
Loss	19–9	Junior dos Santos	TKO (punches)	Gamebred Bareknuckle MMA 7	March 2, 2024	2	4:39	Orlando, Florida, United States	For the Gamebred Bareknuckle MMA Heavyweight Championship. Bare Knuckle MMA.
Win	19–8	Roy Nelson	Decision (split)	Gamebred Bareknuckle MMA 6	November 10, 2023	3	5:00	Biloxi, Mississippi, United States	Bare knuckle MMA. Heavyweight debut.
Loss	18–8	Michael Bisping	Technical Decision (unanimous)	UFC 159	April 27, 2013	3	4:31	Newark, New Jersey, United States	Accidental eye poke rendered Belcher unable to continue.
Loss	18–7	Yushin Okami	Decision (unanimous)	UFC 155	December 29, 2012	3	5:00	Las Vegas, Nevada, United States	
Win	18–6	Rousimar Palhares	TKO (punches and elbows)	UFC on Fox: Diaz vs. Miller	May 5, 2012	1	4:18	East Rutherford, New Jersey, United States	
Win	17–6	Jason MacDonald	TKO (submission to punches)	UFC Fight Night: Shields vs. Ellenberger	September 17, 2011	1	3:48	New Orleans, Louisiana, United States	
Win	16–6	Patrick Côté	Submission (rear-naked choke)	UFC 113	May 8, 2010	2	3:25	Montreal, Quebec, Canada	Submission of the Night.
Win	15–6	Wilson Gouveia	TKO (punches)	UFC 107	December 12, 2009	1	3:03	Memphis, Tennessee, United States	Catchweight (195 lbs) bout; Fight of the Night.
Loss	14–6	Yoshihiro Akiyama	Decision (split)	UFC 100	July 11, 2009	3	5:00	Las Vegas, Nevada, United States	Fight of the Night.
Win	14–5	Denis Kang	Submission (guillotine choke)	UFC 93	January 17, 2009	2	4:36	Dublin, Ireland	Submission of the Night.
Win	13–5	Ed Herman	Decision (split)	UFC Fight Night: Diaz vs. Neer	September 17, 2008	3	5:00	Omaha, Nebraska, United States	
Loss	12–5	Jason Day	TKO (punches)	UFC 83	April 19, 2008	1	3:58	Montreal, Quebec, Canada	
Win	12–4	Kalib Starnes	TKO (doctor stoppage)	UFC 77	October 20, 2007	2	1:39	Cincinnati, Ohio, United States	
Win	11–4	Sean Salmon	Submission (guillotine choke)	UFC 71	May 26, 2007	1	0:53	Las Vegas, Nevada, United States	Light Heavyweight bout.
Loss	10–4	Kendall Grove	Submission (D'arce choke)	UFC 69	April 7, 2007	2	4:42	Houston, Texas, United States	
Win	10–3	Jorge Santiago	KO (head kick)	UFC Fight Night: Sanchez vs. Riggs	December 13, 2006	3	2:45	San Diego, California, United States	
Loss	9–3	Yushin Okami	Decision (unanimous)	UFC 62	August 26, 2006	3	5:00	Las Vegas, Nevada, United States	Middleweight debut.
Win	9–2	Evert Fyeet	Submission (toe hold)	WEF: Orleans Arena	June 10, 2006	1	2:04	Las Vegas, Nevada, United States	
Win	8–2	Buck Meredith	Decision (unanimous)	Raze MMA: Fight Night	April 29, 2006	3	5:00	San Diego, California, United States	
Win	7–2	Marcus Sursa	TKO (punches)	World Extreme Fighting 17	April 1, 2006	1	3:48	Las Vegas, Nevada, United States	
Win	6–2	Ron Fields	TKO (slam)	Titan FC 1	March 11, 2006	1	0:37	Kansas City, Kansas, United States	
Win	5–2	David Frank	TKO (submission to punches)	XFL: EK 19: Battle at the Brady 3	February 18, 2006	2	1:37	Tulsa, Oklahoma, United States	
Win	4–2	Roger Kimes	KO (punches)	XFL: EK 19: Battle at the Brady 3	February 18, 2006	1	1:35	Tulsa, Oklahoma, United States	
Win	3–2	Travis Fowler	TKO (punches)	XFL: EK 19: Battle at the Brady 3	February 18, 2006	1	1:01	Tulsa, Oklahoma, United States	
Loss	2–2	Marvin Eastman	Decision (unanimous)	World Extreme Fighting 16	September 24, 2005	5	5:00	Enid, Oklahoma, United States	Light Heavyweight debut.
Loss	2–1	Edwin Aguilar	TKO (punches)	WXF: X-Impact World Championships	July 9, 2005	1	4:01	Seoul, South Korea	
Win	2–0	Sergei Trovnikov	Submission (armbar)	WXF: X-Impact World Championships	July 9, 2005	1	3:37	Seoul, South Korea	
Win	1–0	Tim Ellis	TKO (punches)	Freestyle Fighting Championships 10	July 24, 2004	1	1:49	Tunica, Mississippi, United States	

== Bare knuckle boxing record ==
Professional record breakdown
4 matches	4 wins	0 losses
By knockout	3	0
By decision	1	0

Res.	Record	Opponent	Method	Event	Date	Round	Time	Location	Notes
Win	4–0	Arnold Adams	KO (punches)	BKFC 36	February 24, 2023	3	0:55	Kenner, Louisiana, United States	Won the BKFC Heavyweight Championship.
Win	3–0	Frank Tate	KO (punch)	BKFC Fight Night: Jackson 2: Belcher vs. Tate	June 11, 2022	1	1:21	Jackson, Mississippi, United States	BKFC Heavyweight title eliminator. Knockout of the Night.
Win	2–0	Bobo O'Bannon	KO (punch)	BKFC Fight Night Jackson: Brito vs. Harris II	January 29, 2022	1	1:48	Jackson, Mississippi, United States	Knockout of the Night.
Win	1–0	Tony Lopez	Decision (unanimous)	BKFC 20	August 20, 2021	5	2:00	Biloxi, Mississippi, United States	

== Boxing record ==
=== Professional ===
6 fights	6 wins	0 losses
By knockout	6	0

No.	Result	Record	Opponent	Type	Round, time	Date	Location	Notes
5	Win	5–0	Rayford Johnson	TKO	5 (6), 2:14	July 23, 2022	Embassy Suites Nashville, Murfreesboro, Tennessee, U.S.	
4	Win	4–0	Cameron Graham	TKO	2 (4), 1:34	May 14, 2022	Biloxi Community Center, Biloxi, Mississippi, U.S.	
3	Win	3–0	Francois Russell	TKO	3 (4), 0:34	Apr 30, 2022	Oak Grove Racing and Gaming Hotel, Oak Grove, Kentucky, U.S.	
2	Win	2–0	Walter Strickland	KO	1 (4)	Dec 11, 2021	Fitzgeralds Casino and Hotel, Tunica, Mississippi, U.S.	
1	Win	1–0	Ryan Shough	TKO	2 (4)	Nov 6, 2021	Furniture Market, Tupelo, Mississippi, U.S.	

=== Exhibition ===
1 fight	1 win	0 losses
By knockout	1	0

No.	Result	Record	Opponent	Type	Round, time	Date	Location	Notes
1	Win	1–0	Chase DeMoor	TKO	3 (3), 2:05	July 22, 2023	Nashville Municipal Auditorium, Nashville, Tennessee, U.S.	

== BJJ record ==
Professional record breakdown
4 matches	0 wins	4 losses
By submission	0	3
By decision	0	1

Result	Opponent	Method	Event	Division	Type	Year
Loss	(United Arab Emirates) Faisal Al-Ketbi	Points	Copa Podio	-94 kg	Gi	2014
Loss	(Brazil) Rodolfo Vieira	Rear-naked choke	Copa Podio	-94 kg	Gi	2014
Loss	(Brazil) Leandro Lo	Rear-naked choke	Copa Podio	-94 kg	Gi	2014
Loss	(Brazil) Alexandre Souza	Armbar	Copa Podio	-94 kg	Gi	2014

== Karate Combat ==
Professional record breakdown
1 match	0 wins	1 loss
By knockout	0	1

Res.	Record	Opponent	Method	Event	Date	Round	Time	Location	Notes
Loss	0–1	Zac Pauga	TKO	Karate Combat 55	July 19, 2025	1	0:36	Miami, Florida, United States	Last Man Standing Quarterfinal.

== See also ==
- List of male boxers
- List of male mixed martial artists
- List of mixed martial artists with professional boxing records
- List of multi-sport athletes
