= Travis Lutter =

American mixed martial arts fighter (born 1973)

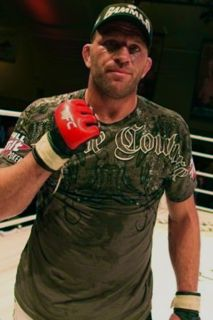
- Travis Lutter
- Born: May 12, 1973 (age 53); Chamberlain, South Dakota, United States
- Other names: The Serial Killer
- Height: 6 ft 2 in (1.88 m)
- Weight: 185 lb (84 kg; 13.2 st)
- Division: Middleweight; Light Heavyweight
- Reach: 75.0 in (191 cm)
- Fighting out of: Fort Worth, Texas
- Team: Team Lutter
- Rank: Coral belt in Brazilian Jiu-Jitsu under Carlos Machado
- Years active: 1998–2010

Mixed martial arts record
- Total: 16
- Wins: 10
- By knockout: 1
- By submission: 7
- By decision: 2
- Losses: 6
- By knockout: 3
- By submission: 2
- By decision: 1

Other information
- Mixed martial arts record from Sherdog

Travis Lutter (born May 12, 1973) is a retired American mixed martial artist who won The Ultimate Fighter 4 reality show. He is a black belt in Brazilian Jiu-Jitsu under Carlos Machado.

== Background ==
Lutter was born and raised in Gann Valley, South Dakota in a farmer family of seven. He began wrestling when he was 12 years old, continuing through high school where he earned All-State honors and then also competed during his first two years attending Northern State University, where he majored in criminal justice. Lutter had originally begun training in Muay Thai, before viewing an early UFC event dominated by Brazilian Jiu-Jitsu specialist, Royce Gracie. Lutter then moved to Dallas, Texas and began training in Brazilian Jiu-Jitsu.

== Mixed martial arts career ==
=== The Ultimate Fighter ===
With this victory, Lutter became the challenger for Anderson Silva's Middleweight title. Lutter dedicated his victory on November 11 to the Wounded Warrior Project, an organization dedicated to support wounded U.S. servicemen.

=== Title shot ===
On the day of the weigh-in, one day before the February 3, 2007 bout at UFC 67, Lutter failed to make weight. He weighed-in at 187 pounds on the first attempt, and 186.5 two hours later on his second attempt. Because of his failure to meet the required 185 pounds, his match with Silva was changed to a three-round, non-title bout. This upset many fans, and he was booed upon his entrance into the octagon. Lutter would go on to lose in the second round via submission due to a triangle choke.

=== After TUF ===
Lutter was scheduled to return to the UFC at UFC 74 on August 25, 2007 against UFC newcomer Ryan Jensen; however he was forced to withdraw from the event due to a neck injury. After over a year's absence from the UFC, Lutter was next matched against former UFC Middleweight Champion Rich Franklin at UFC 83. After nearly catching Franklin with an armbar in the first round, Lutter was defeated by Franklin in the second round by TKO.

After losing two consecutive bouts, Lutter was released from his UFC contract. This makes him the first Ultimate Fighter winner to be released from UFC contract. He defeated Jason "The Athlete" MacDonald in the main event of Maximum Fighting Championship 22 on October 2, 2009.

Lutter's next bout occurred on May 21, 2010, against Rafael Natal. This bout was part of the Moosin: God of Martial Arts show in Worcester, Massachusetts. After 2 take down attempts Lutter was noticeably tired, he lost by knockout in the first round.

=== Retirement ===
Due to the extensive neck injury sustained in the Natal fight and the subsequent long layoff from fighting resulted in Lutter's retirement from professional mixed martial arts competition. Secretly hoping to make it back to the UFC, Lutter did not publicly announce his retirement until a 2019 blog post.

== Personal life ==
Lutter is married and has four children. Lutter owns and operates a martial arts training center in Fort Worth, TX, offering Brazilian Jiu-Jitsu, Muay Thai, kickboxing, and mixed martial arts.

== Championships and accomplishments ==
- Ultimate Fighting Championship
  - The Ultimate Fighter 4 Middleweight winner
  - UFC Encyclopedia Awards
    - Knockout of the Night (One time) vs. Marvin Eastman
  - UFC.com Awards
    - 2006: Ranked #2 Submission of the Year vs. Patrick Côté
- HOOKnSHOOT
  - HnS Light Heavyweight Championship (One time)

== Grappling credentials ==
- Winner Ultimate Submission Challenge 2003
- Competitor 2001 ADCC World Championships
- Competitor 2000 ADCC World Championships
- Winner 2001 National USA ADCC Qualifier
- Winner 2000 National USA ADCC Qualifier
- Brazilian Jiu-Jitsu Black Belt under Carlos Machado
- 1st place 2001 Texas State BJJ Champion
- 3rd place Heavyweight Purple Belt, 2000 Brazilian Jiu-Jitsu World Championships; Rio de Janeiro, Brazil
- 3rd place Purple Belt Heavyweight, 2000 Pan-American Games
- 1st place Heavyweight Champion 1999 Texas Brazilian Jiu-Jitsu Open
- 1st place Heavyweight and Overall Champion 1998 Texas Brazilian Jiu-Jitsu Championships
- 2nd place 1998 Brazilian Jiu-Jitsu World Championships; Rio de Janeiro, Brazil
- 1st place Heavyweight Champion 1998 USA Brazilian Jiu-Jitsu Championships
- 1st place Heavyweight Champion 1997 San Antonio Brazilian Jiu-Jitsu Open

== Mixed martial arts record ==
Professional record breakdown
16 matches	10 wins	6 losses
By knockout	1	3
By submission	7	2
By decision	2	1

Res.	Record	Opponent	Method	Event	Date	Round	Time	Location	Notes
Loss	10–6	Rafael Natal	KO (punches)	Moosin: God of Martial Arts	May 21, 2010	1	4:12	Worcester, Massachusetts, United States	
Win	10–5	Jason MacDonald	Decision (unanimous)	MFC 22	October 2, 2009	3	5:00	Enoch, Alberta, Canada	
Loss	9–5	Rich Franklin	TKO (punches)	UFC 83	April 19, 2008	2	3:01	Montreal, Quebec, Canada	
Loss	9–4	Anderson Silva	Submission (triangle choke)	UFC 67	February 3, 2007	2	2:11	Las Vegas, Nevada, United States	Originally for the UFC Middleweight Championship. Changed to a non-title bout when Lutter missed weight (187 lbs).
Win	9–3	Patrick Côté	Submission (armbar)	The Ultimate Fighter: The Comeback Finale	November 11, 2006	1	2:18	Las Vegas, Nevada, United States	Won The Ultimate Fighter 4 Middleweight Tournament. Submission of the Night.
Win	8–3	Cedric Marks	Submission (armbar)	IFF 1: International Freestyle Fighting 1	May 6, 2006	1	1:15	Ft. Worth, Texas, United States	
Win	7–3	Jose Landi-Jons	Submission (armbar)	Cage Rage 15	February 4, 2006	1	4:00	London, England	
Loss	6–3	Trevor Prangley	Decision (unanimous)	UFC 54: Boiling Point	August 20, 2005	3	5:00	Las Vegas, Nevada, United States	
Win	6–2	Matt Ewin	Submission (keylock)	Cage Rage 12	July 2, 2005	1	1:40	London, England	
Loss	5–2	Matt Lindland	Submission (guillotine choke)	UFC 52: Couture vs Liddell	April 16, 2005	2	3:32	Las Vegas, Nevada, United States	
Win	5–1	Marvin Eastman	KO (punch)	UFC 50	October 22, 2004	2	0:43	Atlantic City, New Jersey, United States	
Win	4–1	Grzegorz Jakubowski	Submission (kimura)	EVT 2: Hazard	April 4, 2004	2	2:45	Stockholm, Sweden	
Win	3–1	Mark Epstein	Submission (rear-naked choke)	EVT 1: Genesis	December 6, 2003	2	2:45	Copenhagen, Denmark	
Loss	2–1	Jorge Rivera	TKO (punches)	USMMA 2: Ring of Fury	September 21, 2002	3	3:46	Lowell, Massachusetts, United States	Lost the HnS Light Heavyweight Championship.
Win	2–0	Chris Munsen	Submission (rear-naked choke)	HOOKnSHOOT: Relentless	May 25, 2002	1	0:45	Evansville, Indiana, United States	Won the HnS Light Heavyweight Championship.
Win	1–0	James Cooper	Decision	PRW: Power Ring Warriors	November 7, 1998	3	5:00	Humble, Texas, United States	
