= Jorge Rivera (fighter) =

American mixed martial arts fighter

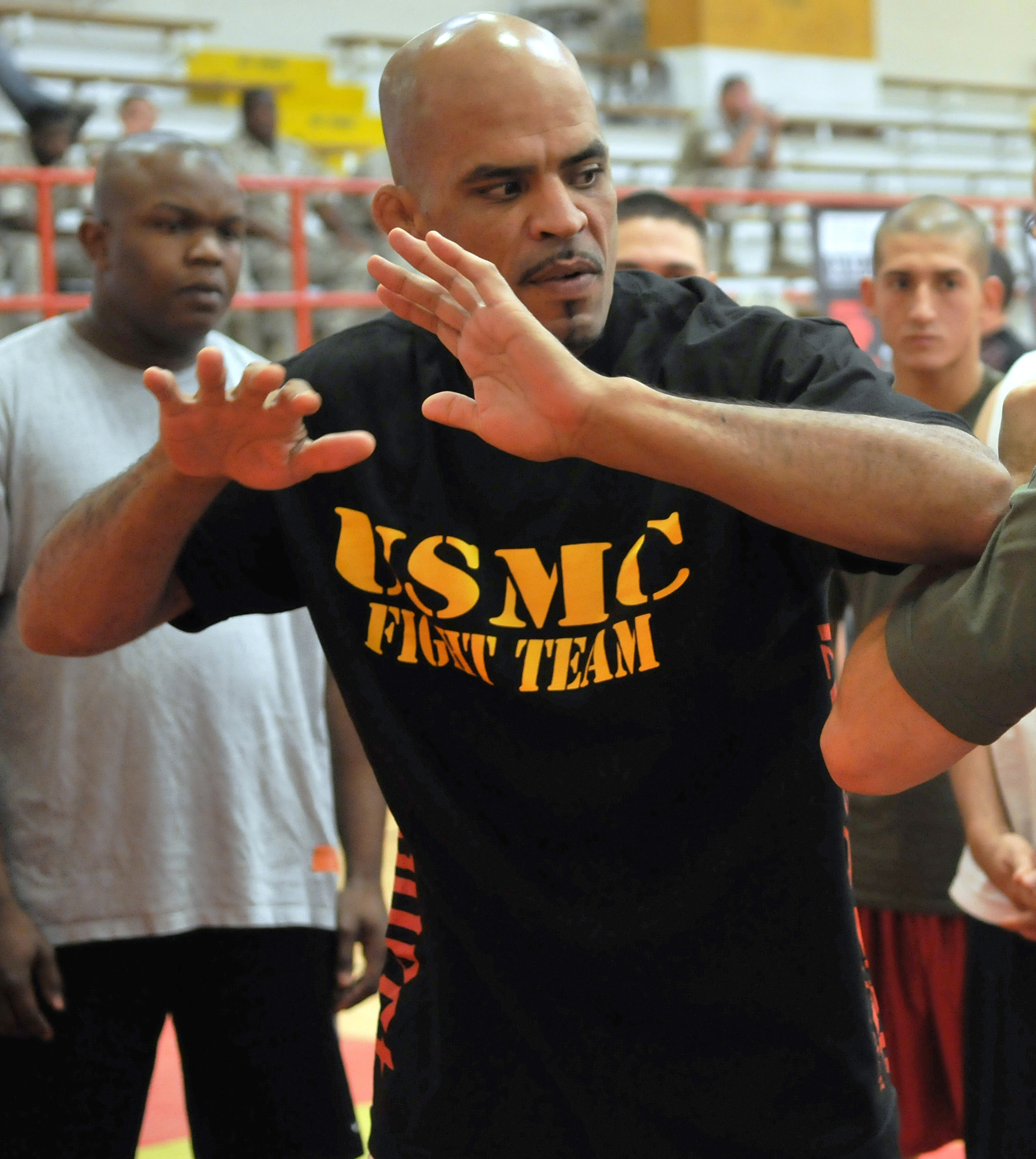
- Rivera in 2009
- Born: Jorge Luis Rivera; February 28, 1972 (age 54); Boston, Massachusetts, U.S
- Other names: El Conquistador
- Height: 6 ft 1 in (1.85 m)
- Weight: 185 lb (84 kg; 13.2 st)
- Division: Heavyweight; Light Heavyweight; Middleweight
- Reach: 73 in (190 cm)
- Stance: Orthodox
- Fighting out of: Milford, Massachusetts, United States
- Team: Rivera Athletic Center
- Rank: Black belt in Brazilian jiu-jitsu under Tim Burrill
- Years active: 2001–2012

Mixed martial arts record
- Total: 29
- Wins: 20
- By knockout: 14
- By submission: 2
- By decision: 4
- Losses: 9
- By knockout: 5
- By submission: 3
- By decision: 1

Other information
- Mixed martial arts record from Sherdog
- Military career
- Allegiance: United States
- Branch: United States Army
- Service years: 1989–1991
- Units: A/1-70 Armor, 5th Infantry Division

Jorge Luis Rivera (born February 28, 1972) is a retired American mixed martial artist who competed in the Middleweight division. Perhaps best known for his 15 fights in the UFC, he was also featured on The Ultimate Fighter 4, after competing for Cage Warriors and Cage Rage in England.

== Background ==
Jorge Luis Rivera was born in Boston, Massachusetts. He and his family then moved to Milford, Massachusetts before finally settling down in Bellingham, Massachusetts. Rivera is of Puerto Rican descent, and being one of the ethnic minorities in these towns, he along with his siblings often got into street fights. When Rivera was 25 years old, he began training in mixed martial arts.

== Military career ==
Rivera served as a 19K M1 Armor Crewman with A/1-70 Armor at Fort Polk, Louisiana. He participated in moving the unit from Fort Polk to Fort Hood, Texas before his enlistment ended in 1992.

== Mixed martial arts career ==
Rivera's first sanctioned fight was in 2001, when he was 29 years old against Branden Lee Hinkle in Chester, West Virginia. Lee Hinkle, who had been fighting professionally for three years, also had the legendary Mark Coleman in his corner. Rivera landed a solid straight right hand early, that knocked out Lee Hinkle's mouthpiece and caused him to stumble, but then responded using his wrestling, picking up and slamming Rivera. Lee Hinkle then proceeded to land many punches that caused referee Din Thomas to stop the fight, making Lee Hinkle the winner by TKO.

Rivera's first fight in the UFC was a unanimous decision victory over David Loiseau at UFC 44. He then followed up with back-to-back submission losses to Lee Murray at UFC 46 and Rich Franklin at UFC 50 before rebounding with a unanimous decision win over Dennis Hallman at UFC 55.

Rivera was defeated by Chris Leben by technical knockout before appearing on The Ultimate Fighter 4 as a Middleweight contestant. Although Rivera was not successful in achieving a slot in the middleweight finals, he appeared on the live card of The Ultimate Fighter 4 Finale, defeating Edwin DeWees by technical knockout in the first round. Jorge then was defeated by Terry Martin by KO via an uppercut at UFC 67, fourteen seconds into round one. Jorge broke his jaw from the knockout punch and did not compete until UFC 80, where he knocked out heavy favorite Kendall Grove in the first round. He went 4–3 after the upset, with wins over Eric Schafer, Nate Quarry, Nissen Osterneck and submission artist Rob Kimmons, with his only losses since coming from top level opponents Martin Kampmann, Michael Bisping, and Costas Philippou.

Rivera was scheduled to face Alessio Sakara on August 28, 2010, at UFC 118, but was forced off the card with an arm injury and replaced by Gerald Harris.

Rivera/Sakara was expected to take place on November 13, 2010, at UFC 122. The fight was scrapped the day of the fight due to a "flu-like" illness from Sakara.

On February 27, 2011, at UFC 127 Rivera lost to Michael Bisping by way of TKO at 1:54 in the 2nd round. Weeks before he was set to fight Bisping, Rivera made some videos mocking and insulting Bisping and his family.

The bout between Rivera and Sakara had been rescheduled again for August 6, 2011 at UFC 133. Before Rivera's fight against Sakara, Rivera mentioned that he may retire from the sport after his next fight due to his age. Rivera instead faced Costas Philippou. He lost the fight via split decision.

Rivera faced Eric Schafer on January 20, 2012, at UFC on FX 1. After a dominant first round from Schafer due to takedowns and ground control, Rivera turned the fight around in the second round and won by TKO due to punches. Following the fight, Rivera retired from mixed martial arts competition.

== Personal life ==
Rivera has a son and four daughters, one of whom, Janessa Marie, his oldest daughter, died unexpectedly from a reaction to prescription medication on August 5, 2008.

== Championships and accomplishments ==
- Ultimate Fighting Championship
  - UFC.com Awards
    - 2008: Ranked #6 Upset of the Year vs. Kendall Grove

== Mixed martial arts record ==
Professional record breakdown
29 matches	20 wins	9 losses
By knockout	14	5
By submission	2	3
By decision	4	1

Res.	Record	Opponent	Method	Event	Date	Round	Time	Location	Notes
Win	20–9	Eric Schafer	TKO (punches)	UFC on FX: Guillard vs. Miller	January 20, 2012	2	1:31	Nashville, Tennessee, United States	
Loss	19–9	Costas Philippou	Decision (split)	UFC 133	August 6, 2011	3	5:00	Philadelphia, Pennsylvania, United States	
Loss	19–8	Michael Bisping	TKO (punches)	UFC 127	February 27, 2011	2	1:54	Sydney, Australia	Bisping was deducted one point in round 1 after landing an illegal knee.
Win	19–7	Nate Quarry	TKO (punches)	UFC Fight Night: Florian vs. Gomi	March 31, 2010	2	0:29	Charlotte, North Carolina, United States	
Win	18–7	Rob Kimmons	TKO (punches)	UFC 104	October 24, 2009	3	1:53	Los Angeles, California, United States	
Win	17–7	Nissen Osterneck	Decision (split)	UFC Fight Night: Condit vs. Kampmann	April 1, 2009	3	5:00	Nashville, Tennessee, United States	
Loss	16–7	Martin Kampmann	Submission (guillotine choke)	UFC 85	June 7, 2008	1	2:44	London, England	
Win	16–6	Kendall Grove	KO (punches)	UFC 80	January 19, 2008	1	1:20	Newcastle, England	
Loss	15–6	Terry Martin	KO (punches)	UFC 67	February 3, 2007	1	0:14	Las Vegas, Nevada, United States	
Win	15–5	Edwin Dewees	TKO (punches)	The Ultimate Fighter: The Comeback Finale	November 11, 2006	1	2:37	Las Vegas, Nevada, United States	
Win	14–5	Timothy Williams	TKO (punches)	WFL – Real: No Fooling Around	April 1, 2006	1	3:50	Revere, Massachusetts, United States	
Loss	13–5	Chris Leben	TKO (punches)	UFC Fight Night 3	January 16, 2006	1	1:44	Las Vegas, Nevada, United States	
Win	13–4	Dennis Hallman	Decision (unanimous)	UFC 55	October 7, 2005	3	5:00	Uncasville, Connecticut, United States	
Win	12–4	Marcelo Azevedo	Decision (unanimous)	Cage Rage 13	September 10, 2005	3	5:00	London, England	
Win	11–4	Danny Vega	Technical submission (arm-triangle choke)	WFL: Unleashed	August 6, 2005	1	0:47	Revere, Massachusetts, United States	
Loss	10–4	Anderson Silva	TKO (knees and punches)	Cage Rage 11	April 30, 2005	2	3:53	London, England	
Win	10–3	Alex Reid	KO (punches)	Cage Rage 10	February 26, 2005	1	0:41	London, England	
Loss	9–3	Rich Franklin	Submission (armbar)	UFC 50	October 22, 2004	3	4:28	Atlantic City, New Jersey, United States	
Win	9–2	Mark Weir	TKO (doctor stoppage)	Cage Rage 7	July 10, 2004	1	5:00	London, England	
Win	8–2	James Gabert	TKO (punches)	MMA: Eruption	April 30, 2004	3	4:10	Lowell, Massachusetts, United States	
Loss	7–2	Lee Murray	Submission (triangle armbar)	UFC 46	January 31, 2004	1	1:45	Las Vegas, Nevada, United States	
Win	7–1	David Loiseau	Decision (unanimous)	UFC 44	September 26, 2003	3	5:00	Las Vegas, Nevada, United States	Middleweight debut.
Win	6–1	Solomon Hutcherson	KO (punches)	USMMA 3: Ring of Fury	May 3, 2003	1	3:01	Boston, Massachusetts, United States	
Win	5–1	Andy Lagden	Submission (rear naked choke)	CWFC 2 - Fists of Fury	Nov 30, 2002	1	N/A	London, England	
Win	4–1	Travis Lutter	TKO (punches)	USMMA 2: Ring of Fury	September 21, 2002	3	3:46	Lowell, Massachusetts, United States	Defended the USMMA Light Heavyweight Championship.
Win	3–1	Joe Nye	TKO (punches)	USMMA 1: Ring of Fury	May 18, 2002	1	0:52	Lowell, Massachusetts, United States	Light Heavyweight debut; won the vacant USMMA Light Heavyweight Championship.
Win	2–1	Brian Hawkins	KO (punches)	TFC FightZone: Back in the Zone	March 22, 2002	1	N/A	Toledo, Ohio, United States	
Win	1–1	Elias Rivera	TKO (punches)	Mass Destruction 3	March 22, 2002	1	6:50	Springfield, Massachusetts, United States	Won the vacant Mass Destruction Heavyweight Championship.
Loss	0–1	Branden Lee Hinkle	TKO (corner stoppage)	RSF 2: Attack at the Track	June 23, 2001	2	1:54	Chester, West Virginia, United States	

== See also ==
- List of Puerto Ricans
