= Patrick Côté (fighter) =

Canadian mixed martial arts fighter

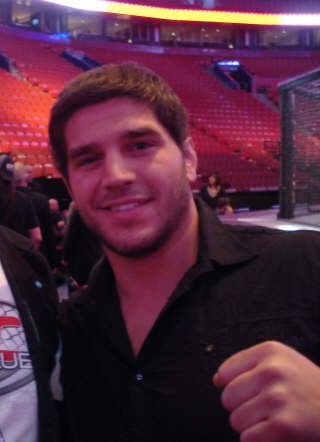
- Côté in 2016
- Born: February 29, 1980 (age 46); Rimouski, Quebec, Canada
- Nickname: The Predator
- Height: 5 ft 11 in (1.80 m)
- Weight: 170 lb (77 kg; 12 st)
- Division: Welterweight (2012–2017); Middleweight (2005–2012); Light Heavyweight (2002–2005)
- Reach: 71 in (180 cm)
- Fighting out of: Montreal, Quebec, Canada
- Team: Brazilian Top Team Canada
- Rank: Black belt in Brazilian Jiu-Jitsu under Fábio Holanda
- Years active: 2002–2017

Professional boxing record
- Total: 1
- Wins: 0
- Losses: 1

Mixed martial arts record
- Total: 34
- Wins: 23
- By knockout: 10
- By submission: 3
- By decision: 9
- By disqualification: 1
- Losses: 11
- By knockout: 2
- By submission: 3
- By decision: 6

Other information
- Website: patrickcote.com
- Boxing record from BoxRec
- Mixed martial arts record from Sherdog

Patrick Côté (French pronunciation: [patʁik kote]; born February 29, 1980) is a retired Canadian professional mixed martial artist. A professional from 2002 until 2017, Côté fought in 21 bouts in the UFC, and was a finalist on season four of The Ultimate Fighter.

== Background ==
Côté was born in Rimouski, Québec, Canada, on February 29, 1980. Côté started his martial arts training in the Canadian Army at around age of 16, where he took up boxing and subsequently added muay thai, kickboxing and wrestling to his repertoire. Côté served in the army until 2005, when he started training full-time. He also studied Brazilian Jiu Jitsu under Fabio Holanda at BTT Canada. Côté also studies Muay Thai with renowned coach Mark DellaGrotte, a former coach on The Ultimate Fighter 4. He also maintains ties with Team Legion.

== Mixed martial arts career ==
=== Ultimate Fighting Championship ===
Côté made his UFC debut at UFC 50, on October 22, 2004 against Tito Ortiz. Côté accepted the fight on just four days' notice when Lion's Den veteran Guy Mezger pulled out of the main event due to an injury. He said to Ortiz before the fight that, if he thought Chuck Liddell hit hard, he hit harder. Côté lost via unanimous decision; however, he impressed UFC officials by not being submitted or knocked out by Ortiz and displaying toughness and willingness to take the fight on short notice.

Côté returned to the octagon in 2005 losing his next two fights to Joe Doerksen and Chris Leben. In 2006, Côté was a contestant on The Ultimate Fighter: The Comeback, defeating Jorge Rivera and Edwin Dewees in exhibition matches. He advanced to the finale, where he lost by first round submission to Brazilian Jiu-Jitsu fighter Travis Lutter at The Ultimate Fighter 4 Finale in a non-exhibition match. This loss brought Côté's official UFC record to 0–4.

Three months later Côté earned his first win in the UFC at UFC 67, defeating TUF4 teammate Scott Smith by unanimous decision. In August 2007, he defeated TUF3 winner Kendall Grove at UFC 74 via TKO in the first round. This fight earned him another Knockout of the Night award. Côté then fought Drew McFedries at UFC Fight Night 12, winning in the first round via TKO after catching McFedries with a counter punch. This fight earned him another Knockout of the Night award. Côté extended his UFC win streak to four fights at UFC 86 by defeating Ricardo Almeida via split decision, also earning him a title shot.

Côté faced UFC Middleweight Champion Anderson Silva on October 25, 2008 at UFC 90, the UFC's first event in Illinois. Silva won the first 2 rounds but Côté proved how good his chin was by taking a roundhouse kick and flying knee right on the button without getting rocked in the very first round. In the third round, Côté's movement inside the octagon caused too much pressure on the back of his right leg (which he was using to move forward) and an injury caused him to fall to the mat grasping his right knee in pain. Referee Herb Dean declared the fight over when Côté could not continue, ruling the bout a TKO victory for Silva. Côté, however, became the first of Silva's UFC opponents to make it into the third round.

On January 25, 2009, while taking time off for his surgically repaired knee, Patrick said during an interview with MMA Mania that if he gets a rematch with Anderson Silva he is confident that he will beat him. He also indicated in a July 2009 interview with Rogers Sportsnet's MMA Connected television program that he would like to fight Michael Bisping, assuming that Bisping lost to Dan Henderson.

Côté returned from his injury after nearly a year and a half off at UFC 113. In the second round Côté was submitted via rear naked choke by Alan Belcher after being slammed on his head. Côté complained after the loss that he had been illegally spiked onto the canvas, but the referee ruled that Côté had landed on his face, not his head.

Côté faced Tom Lawlor on October 23, 2010 at UFC 121. Out-wrestled by his opponent for all three rounds, Côté lost the fight by unanimous decision with 30–27 scores on all three judges' cards.

After the loss to Lawlor and with a record of 4-7 in the UFC, Côté was released from the promotion.

=== Independent promotions ===
On January 18, 2011, Côté confirmed via Twitter that he had signed a contract with Montreal's Ringside MMA promotion to fight at an upcoming card to be held at Montreal's Bell Centre. He faced fellow UFC veteran Kalib Starnes and won the fight via unanimous decision.

On June 4, 2011, Côté faced fellow UFC veteran Todd Brown. The day before, Brown and Côté were in a heated confrontation when Brown shoved Cote during the weigh-ins and Cote slapped Brown across the face afterwards. Côté won the fight by unanimous decision.

On October 7, 2011, Côté faced muay thai specialist Crafton Wallace at Instinct MMA 1 in Boisbriand, Quebec, Canada. Côté won the fight via TKO after Wallace injured his leg by stuffing a takedown.

Côté next fought on March 31, 2012 at AFC 2 against Gracie trained BJJ black belt Gustavo Machado in Brazil. Côté won via KO in the first round.

=== Return to UFC ===
Côté returned to the UFC stepping in as a replacement for Rich Franklin against Cung Le on July 7, 2012 at UFC 148. Côté was defeated via unanimous decision.

Côté next fought Alessio Sakara on November 17, 2012 at UFC 154. He won the fight via disqualification after being punched in the back of the head multiple times.

A rematch was briefly linked with Sakara for March 16, 2013 at UFC 158. However, Sakara was forced out of the bout with a kidney illness.

On December 18, 2012, it was announced that Côté was dropping down to the welterweight division. Côté faced promotional newcomer Bobby Voelker on March 16, 2013 at UFC 158. He was successful in his welterweight debut, winning the back-and-forth fight via unanimous decision.

On June 14, 2013, it was announced that Côté would be coaching The Ultimate Fighter Nations: Canada vs. Australia, opposite Kyle Noke. The reality show features welterweights and middleweights. The coaches faced each other on April 16, 2014 at The Ultimate Fighter Nations Finale. Côté won the fight by unanimous decision.

Côté faced Stephen Thompson on September 27, 2014 at UFC 178. He lost the fight via unanimous decision.

Côté faced Joe Riggs at UFC 186 on April 25, 2015. He won the back-and-forth fight by unanimous decision.

Côté faced Josh Burkman on August 23, 2015 at UFC Fight Night 74. He won the back and forth fight via TKO in the third round and both participants were awarded Fight of the Night honors. Côté became the first person to beat Burkman by TKO.

Côté faced Ben Saunders on January 17, 2016 at UFC Fight Night 81. He won the fight via TKO in the second round.

Côté next faced Donald Cerrone on June 18, 2016 at UFC Fight Night 89. He lost the fight via TKO in the third round.

Côté faced Thiago Alves on April 8, 2017 at UFC 210. He lost the fight via unanimous decision and subsequently announced his retirement from the sport.

== Championships and accomplishments ==
- Canadian Pro-Wrestling Hall of Fame
  - Class of 2022 (MMA Wing)
- Maximum Fighting Championship
  - MFC Middleweight Championship (One time)
- Ultimate Fighting Championship
  - Fight of the Night (One Time) vs. Josh Burkman
  - Knockout of the Night (Two times) vs. Kendall Grove and Drew McFedries
  - UFC Encyclopedia Awards
    - Fight of the Night (One time) vs. Chris Leben
  - The Ultimate Fighter 4 (Finalist)
- MMAJunkie.com
  - 2015 August Fight of the Month vs. Josh Burkman

== Mixed martial arts record ==
Professional record breakdown
34 matches	23 wins	11 losses
By knockout	10	2
By submission	3	3
By decision	9	6
By disqualification	1	0

Res.	Record	Opponent	Method	Event	Date	Round	Time	Location	Notes
Loss	23–11	Thiago Alves	Decision (unanimous)	UFC 210	April 8, 2017	3	5:00	Buffalo, New York, United States	
Loss	23–10	Donald Cerrone	TKO (punches)	UFC Fight Night: MacDonald vs. Thompson	June 18, 2016	3	2:35	Ottawa, Ontario, Canada	
Win	23–9	Ben Saunders	TKO (punches)	UFC Fight Night: Dillashaw vs. Cruz	January 17, 2016	2	1:14	Boston, Massachusetts, United States	
Win	22–9	Josh Burkman	TKO (punches)	UFC Fight Night: Holloway vs. Oliveira	August 23, 2015	3	1:26	Saskatoon, Saskatchewan, Canada	Fight of the Night.
Win	21–9	Joe Riggs	Decision (unanimous)	UFC 186	April 25, 2015	3	5:00	Montreal, Quebec, Canada	
Loss	20–9	Stephen Thompson	Decision (unanimous)	UFC 178	September 27, 2014	3	5:00	Las Vegas, Nevada, United States	
Win	20–8	Kyle Noke	Decision (unanimous)	The Ultimate Fighter Nations Finale: Bisping vs. Kennedy	April 16, 2014	3	5:00	Quebec City, Quebec, Canada	
Win	19–8	Bobby Voelker	Decision (unanimous)	UFC 158	March 16, 2013	3	5:00	Montreal, Quebec, Canada	Welterweight debut.
Win	18–8	Alessio Sakara	DQ (punches to back of head)	UFC 154	November 17, 2012	1	1:26	Montreal, Quebec, Canada	
Loss	17–8	Cung Le	Decision (unanimous)	UFC 148	July 7, 2012	3	5:00	Las Vegas, Nevada, United States	
Win	17–7	Gustavo Machado	KO (punches)	Amazon Forest Combat 2	March 31, 2012	1	2:44	Manaus, Brazil	
Win	16–7	Crafton Wallace	TKO (knee injury)	Instinct MMA 1	October 7, 2011	1	1:36	Boisbriand, Quebec, Canada	
Win	15–7	Todd Brown	Decision (unanimous)	Ringside MMA 11	June 4, 2011	3	5:00	Quebec City, Quebec, Canada	Catchweight (190 lbs) bout.
Win	14–7	Kalib Starnes	Decision (unanimous)	Ringside MMA 10	April 9, 2011	3	5:00	Montreal, Quebec, Canada	
Loss	13–7	Tom Lawlor	Decision (unanimous)	UFC 121	October 23, 2010	3	5:00	Anaheim, California, United States	
Loss	13–6	Alan Belcher	Submission (rear-naked choke)	UFC 113	May 8, 2010	2	3:25	Montreal, Quebec, Canada	
Loss	13–5	Anderson Silva	TKO (knee injury)	UFC 90	October 25, 2008	3	0:39	Rosemont, Illinois, United States	For the UFC Middleweight Championship.
Win	13–4	Ricardo Almeida	Decision (split)	UFC 86	July 5, 2008	3	5:00	Las Vegas, Nevada, United States	
Win	12–4	Drew McFedries	TKO (punches)	UFC Fight Night: Swick vs. Burkman	January 23, 2008	1	1:44	Las Vegas, Nevada, United States	Knockout of the Night.
Win	11–4	Kendall Grove	TKO (punches)	UFC 74	August 25, 2007	1	4:45	Las Vegas, Nevada, United States	Knockout of the Night.
Win	10–4	Jason Day	TKO (punches)	TKO 29	June 1, 2007	1	4:05	Montreal, Quebec, Canada	
Win	9–4	Scott Smith	Decision (unanimous)	UFC 67	February 3, 2007	3	5:00	Las Vegas, Nevada, United States	
Loss	8–4	Travis Lutter	Submission (armbar)	The Ultimate Fighter: The Comeback Finale	November 11, 2006	1	2:18	Las Vegas, Nevada, United States	The Ultimate Fighter Season 4 Middleweight tournament final.
Win	8–3	Jason MacDonald	Submission (rear-naked choke)	MFC 9: No Excuses	March 10, 2006	5	3:35	Edmonton, Alberta, Canada	Won the MFC Middleweight Championship.
Win	7–3	Bill Mahood	Submission (guillotine choke)	KOTC	February 11, 2006	2	2:42	Prince George, British Columbia, Canada	
Loss	6–3	Chris Leben	Decision (split)	UFC Ultimate Fight Night	August 6, 2005	3	5:00	Las Vegas, Nevada, United States	
Loss	6–2	Joe Doerksen	Submission (rear-naked choke)	UFC 52	April 16, 2005	3	2:35	Las Vegas, Nevada, United States	Middleweight debut.
Win	6–1	Ricardeau Francois	Decision (split)	TKO 19	January 29, 2005	3	5:00	Montreal, Quebec, Canada	Defended the TKO Canadian Light Heavyweight Championship.
Loss	5–1	Tito Ortiz	Decision (unanimous)	UFC 50	October 22, 2004	3	5:00	Atlantic City, New Jersey, United States	
Win	5–0	Bill Mahood	KO (punch)	TKO 16	May 22, 2004	1	0:21	Quebec City, Quebec, Canada	Defended the TKO Canadian Light Heavyweight Championship.
Win	4–0	Steve Vigneault	KO (punch)	TKO 14	November 29, 2003	1	1:08	Victoriaville, Quebec, Canada	Won the TKO Canadian Light Heavyweight Championship.
Win	3–0	Yan Pellerin	Decision (unanimous)	TKO 13	September 6, 2003	3	5:00	Montreal, Quebec, Canada	
Win	2–0	Glenn Murdoch	TKO (punches)	UCC Proving Ground 9	March 22, 2003	1	5:00	Victoriaville, Quebec, Canada	
Win	1–0	Pascal Gosselin	Submission (rear-naked choke)	UCC Proving Ground 8	November 3, 2002	1	1:18	Victoriaville, Quebec, Canada	

=== Exhibition record ===
Exhibition record breakdown		
2 matches	2 wins	0 losses
By decision	2	0

Res.	Record	Opponent	Method	Event	Date	Round	Time	Location	Notes
Win	2–0	Edwin Dewees	Decision (unanimous)	The Ultimate Fighter 4	November 2, 2006 (airdate)	3	5:00	Las Vegas, Nevada, United States	Semi-finals bout.
Win	1–0	Jorge Rivera	Decision (unanimous)	The Ultimate Fighter 4	October 6, 2006 (airdate)	2	5:00	Las Vegas, Nevada, United States	Quarter-finals bout.

== Professional boxing record ==
1 fight	0 wins	1 loss
By decision	0	1

No.	Result	Record	Opponent	Method	Round, time	Date	Location	Notes
1	Loss	0–1	(Canada) Stephane Tessier	MD	4	October 1, 2005	Delta Hotel, Trois-Rivières, Quebec, Canada	

== See also ==
- List of male mixed martial artists
- List of mixed martial artists with professional boxing records
- List of Canadian UFC fighters
