= Jason Day (fighter) =

Canadian mixed martial arts fighter

- Born: March 18, 1979 (age 47); Lethbridge, Alberta, Canada
- Other names: Dooms
- Height: 6 ft 0 in (1.83 m)
- Weight: 204.5 lb (92.8 kg; 14.61 st)
- Division: Light Heavyweight; Middleweight
- Stance: Orthodox
- Fighting out of: Lethbridge, Alberta, Canada
- Team: Canadian Martial Arts Centre
- Rank: Purple belt in Brazilian Jiu-Jitsu
- Years active: 2002-2011

Mixed martial arts record
- Total: 31
- Wins: 19
- By knockout: 8
- By submission: 9
- By decision: 2
- Losses: 12
- By knockout: 7
- By submission: 5

Other information
- Mixed martial arts record from Sherdog

Jason Day (born March 18, 1979) is a Canadian former mixed martial artist. A professional from 2002 until 2011, he fought in the UFC, King of the Cage, the MFC, and the AFC. He is perhaps best remembered for his upset win in his UFC debut over veteran Alan Belcher.

== Mixed martial arts career ==
=== Early career ===
Day made his professional debut in 2002 and fought on the regional circuit in Canada. After defeating UFC veteran David Loiseau via decision in 2008, Day was signed by the promotion.

=== Ultimate Fighting Championship ===
Day made his UFC debut at UFC 83 on April 19, 2008 against Alan Belcher. Despite being an underdog against Belcher, Day won via first-round TKO.

Day then faced future UFC Middleweight Champion Michael Bisping at UFC 85. Day was defeated via first-round TKO. He was next scheduled to face Jason Lambert at UFC 88, but the bout was scrapped due to Day injuring his elbow and bicep.

Day returned at UFC 96 to face Ultimate Fighter Season 7 winner Kendall Grove. He was defeated again via first-round TKO, and was subsequently released from the promotion.

=== Regional circuit ===
Upon being released from the UFC, Day returned to fight in the Canadian regional scene, going just 1-3 but losing to UFC veterans Jesse Taylor, Ovince St. Preux, and Francis Carmont.

On August 4, 2011, he was involved in a traffic accident while riding on his bike. Due to sustained injuries by the accident, Day could no longer compete in MMA. In 2014 the court ruled that the car driver was 90-percent at fault. The judgment awarded Day $375,000 in damages due to any potential lost earnings and emotional suffering that came with a premature end to his athletic career, from which he was granted $340,000 as the collision was ruled 10-percent his fault.

=== Political career ===
On March 2, 2024, Day was nominated as the Conservative Party of British Columbia nominee for Columbia River-Revelstoke in the upcoming 2024 British Columbia general election. However, he ended his candidacy after social media posts emerged of Day accusing the World Health Organization of attempting to "achieve world government" by removing "from the minds of men, their individualism, loyalty to family traditions, national patriotism and religious dogmas", although Conservative Party Campaign Manager Angelo Isidorou claimed that Day left the race for personal reasons.

== Championships and accomplishments ==
- Ultimate Fighting Championship
  - UFC.com Awards
    - 2008: Ranked #10 Upset of the Year vs. Alan Belcher

== Mixed martial arts record ==
Professional record breakdown
31 matches	19 wins	12 losses
By knockout	8	7
By submission	9	5
By decision	2	0

Res.	Record	Opponent	Method	Event	Date	Round	Time	Location	Notes
Loss	19–12	Francis Carmont	TKO (punches)	Slammer In The Hammer	June 17, 2011	1	2:10	Hamilton, Ontario, Canada	
Loss	19–11	Ovince St. Preux	KO (punches)	EFC 5: Summer Rumble	July 24, 2010	1	0:08	Lloydminster, Canada	Return to Light Heavyweight.
Loss	19–10	Jesse Taylor	Submission (rear-naked choke)	AMMA 2: Vengeance	February 5, 2010	1	4:56	Edmonton, Alberta, Canada	
Win	19–9	Trevor Stewardson	Submission (twister)	Rumble in the Cage 35	June 6, 2009	2	4:12	Lethbridge, Alberta, Canada	
Loss	18–9	Kendall Grove	TKO (punches and elbows)	UFC 96	March 7, 2009	1	1:32	Columbus, Ohio, United States	
Loss	18–8	Michael Bisping	TKO (punches)	UFC 85	June 7, 2008	1	3:42	London, England	
Win	18–7	Alan Belcher	TKO (punches)	UFC 83	April 19, 2008	1	3:58	Montreal, Quebec, Canada	
Win	17–7	David Loiseau	Decision (split)	HCF: Destiny	February 1, 2008	3	5:00	Calgary, Alberta, Canada	
Win	16–7	Ron Faircloth	TKO (punches)	UCW 10: X-Factor	November 30, 2007	2	N/A	Winnipeg, Manitoba, Canada	
Win	15–7	Shawn Marchand	TKO (punches)	RITC 26: Rumble in the Cage 26	October 27, 2007	1	2:00	Alberta, Canada	
Win	14–7	Jonathan Goulet	Submission (armbar)	UCW 8: Natural Invasion	June 23, 2007	2	4:12	Manitoba, Canada	
Loss	13–7	Patrick Côté	TKO (punches)	TKO 29: Repercussion	June 1, 2007	1	4:05	Montreal, Quebec, Canada	
Win	13–6	Scott Arnold	Submission (armbar)	RITC 21: Seasons Beatings	December 30, 2006	1	1:44	Alberta, Canada	
Win	12–6	Ricardeau Francois	Submission (guillotine choke)	KOTC: Amplified	November 26, 2006	1	1:21	Alberta, Canada	
Win	11–6	Shawn Marchand	TKO (punches)	MFC: Unplugged 2	November 10, 2006	1	1:54	Alberta, Canada	
Win	10–6	Marcus Hicks	Submission	RITC 19: Rumble in the Cage 19	October 21, 2006	1	3:41	Alberta, Canada	
Win	9–6	Shane Lightle	Submission (rear-naked choke)	RITC 18: Rumble in the Cage 18	September 30, 2006	1	1:31	Alberta, Canada	
Loss	8–6	Victor Valimaki	Submission (rear-naked choke)	MFC 10: Unfinished Business	September 8, 2006	1	2:15	Canada	
Win	8–5	Linden Linklater	TKO (punches)	RITC 17: Rumble in the Cage 17	June 17, 2006	1	1:52	Alberta, Canada	
Win	7–5	Chris Fontaine	TKO (punches)	UCW 4: Ultimate Cage Wars 4	May 27, 2006	1	N/A	Manitoba, Canada	
Win	6–5	MJ Rooney	TKO (punches)	KOTC: Karnage	April 22, 2006	1	1:36	Alberta, Canada	
Win	5–5	Yoosef Penny	Submission (rear-naked choke)	MFC 9: No Excuses	March 10, 2006	1	1:00	Alberta, Canada	
Win	4–5	Greg Rogalsky	Submission (guillotine choke)	KOTC: Conquest	December 3, 2005	1	2:22	Alberta, Canada	Middleweight debut.
Loss	3–5	Krzysztof Soszynski	TKO (punches)	RR 11: Roadhouse Rumble 11	Apr 9, 2005	1	2:08	Alberta, Canada	
Loss	3–4	Ulysses Castro	KO (punches)	WFF 6: World Freestyle Fighting 6	May 14, 2004	1	2:22	Vancouver, British Columbia, Canada	
Loss	3–3	Cameron Brown	Submission (rear-naked choke)	Roadhouse Rumble 9	March 20, 2004	1	N/A	Canada	
Win	3–2	Krzysztof Soszynski	Decision (unanimous)	RR 8: Roadhouse Rumble 8	Nov 1, 2003	2	5:00	Alberta, Canada	
Loss	2–2	Derek Tisdale	Submission (armbar)	WFC: Western Freestyle Championships	October 12, 2003	1	N/A	Vernon, British Columbia, Canada	
Loss	2–1	Rodrigo Munduruca	Submission (rear-naked choke)	TIBF: Take it by Force	May 10, 2003	1	N/A	Manitoba, Canada	
Win	2–0	Jason Segal	TKO (punches)	RR 6: Roadhouse Rumble 6	October 5, 2002	1	N/A	Alberta, Canada	
Win	1–0	Jeremiah Cram	Submission (guillotine choke)	BTB: Border Town Brawl	July 27, 2002	2	N/A	Lloydminster, Canada	
