= 2010 in Maximum Fighting Championship =

Information
- First date: February 26, 2010
- Last date: November 12, 2010

Events
- Total events: 4

Fights
- Total fights: 35
- Title fights: 2

Chronology
2009 in MFC	2010 in Maximum Fighting Championship	2011 in MFC

The year 2010 is the 9th year in the history of the Maximum Fighting Championship, a mixed martial arts promotion based in Canada. In 2010 Maximum Fighting Championship held 4 events beginning with, MFC 24: HeatXC.

== Title fights ==
Title fights in 2010
Weight class				Method	Round	Time	Event	Notes
Lightweight	Antonio McKee (c)	def.	Luciano Azevedo	TKO (Doctor Stoppage)	1	3:11	MFC 26: Retribution	(Note: For the MFC Lightweight Championship)
Welterweight	Douglas Lima	def.	Jesse Juarez	Submission (Triangle Armbar)	3	2:37	MFC 27: Breaking Point	(Note: For the MFC Welterweight Championship)

== Events list ==
#	Event title	Date	Arena	Location	Attendance
30	MFC 27: Breaking Point	November 12, 2010	River Cree Resort and Casino	Edmonton, Alberta	
29	MFC 26: Retribution	September 10, 2010	River Cree Resort and Casino	Edmonton, Alberta	
28	MFC 25: Vindication	May 7, 2010	Edmonton Expo Centre	Edmonton, Alberta	4,232
27	MFC 24: HeatXC	February 26, 2010	River Cree Resort and Casino	Edmonton, Alberta	

== MFC 24: HeatXC ==
MFC 24: HeatXC was an event held on February 26, 2010 at the River Cree Resort and Casino in Edmonton, Alberta.

=== Results ===
Main Card
Weight class				Method	Round	Time	Notes
Lightweight	Yves Edwards	def.	Derrick Noble	TKO (Punches)	1	4:44
Middleweight	Tom Watson	def.	Travis Galbraith	KO (Head Kick)	1	1:56
Light heavyweight	Dwayne Lewis	def.	Ryan McClain	TKO (Punches and Elbows)	2	2:08
Welterweight	Jesse Juarez	def.	Nathan Gunn	KO (Head Kick)	1	0:11
Welterweight	Dami Egbeyemi	def.	Paapa Inkumsah	Decision (Split)	3	5:00
Welterweight	David Letourneau	def.	Nick Hrynchyshyn	Decision (Unanimous)	3	5:00
Lightweight	Garret Nybakken	def.	Chris Barber	Submission (Rear-Naked Choke)	1	2:30
Light heavyweight	Zach Blaber	def.	Eric Chouinard	Submission (Kimura)	1	1:17

== MFC 25: Vindication ==
MFC 25: Vindication was an event held on May 7, 2010 at the Edmonton Expo Centre in Edmonton, Alberta.

=== Results ===
Main Card
Weight class				Method	Round	Time	Notes
Middleweight	Thales Leites	def.	Jesse Taylor	Submission (Triangle Armbar)	1	2:27
Catchweight (208 lbs.)	Ryan Jimmo	def.	Wilson Gouveia	Decision (Unanimous)	3	5:00
Light Heavyweight	Emanuel Newton	def.	Dwayne Lewis	Decision (Unanimous)	3	5:00
Welterweight	Pete Spratt	def.	Luigi Fioravanti	TKO (Punches)	3	4:02
Welterweight	Gavin Neil	def.	Richie Hightower	Submission (Rear-Naked Choke)	1	2:52
Heavyweight	Chase Gormley	def.	Ryan Fortin	Decision (Unanimous)	3	5:00
Preliminary Card
Welterweight	Chad Freeman	def.	Mike Froese	Submission (Armbar)	1	3:48
Welterweight	Keto Allen	def.	Aaron Berke	TKO (Punches)	1	2:58
Lightweight	Jevon Marshall	def.	Garret Nybakken	Submission (Rear-Naked Choke)	3	2:00

== MFC 26: Retribution ==
MFC 26: Retribution was an event held on September 10, 2010 at the River Cree Resort and Casino in Edmonton, Alberta.

=== Results ===
Main Card
Weight class				Method	Round	Time	Notes
Welterweight	Douglas Lima	def.	Ryan Ford	Submission (Armbar)	2	0:48
Lightweight	Antonio McKee (c)	def.	Luciano Azevedo	TKO (Doctor Stoppage)	1	3:11	(Note: For the MFC Lightweight Championship)
Middleweight	Jesse Taylor	def.	Tom Watson	Decision (Unanimous)	3	5:00
Light Heavyweight	Dwayne Lewis	def.	Mike Nickels	TKO (Punches)	1	1:30
Middleweight	David Heath	def.	Solomon Hutcherson	KO (Superman Punch)	2	3:46
Lightweight	Curtis Demarce	def.	Tyson Steele	Submission (Triangle Choke)	2	4:09
Preliminary Card
Middleweight	Ford Robertson	def.	Andrew Buckland	Decision (Unanimous)	3	5:00
Catchweight (179 lbs)	Aaron Berke	def.	Ryan Ballingall	Submission (Rear-Naked Choke)	2	0:35
Lightweight	Chad Freeman	def.	Theo Brisley	Submission (Armbar)	1	3:04

== MFC 27: Breaking Point ==
MFC 27: Breaking Point was an event held on November 12, 2010 at the River Cree Resort and Casino in Edmonton, Alberta.

=== Results ===
Main Card
Weight class				Method	Round	Time	Notes
Welterweight	Douglas Lima	def.	Jesse Juarez	Submission (Triangle Armbar)	3	2:37	(Note: For the MFC Welterweight Championship)
Welterweight	Ryan Ford	def.	Pete Spratt	Submission (Rear-Naked Choke)	2	3:07
Light Heavyweight	Dwayne Lewis	def.	Razak Al-Hassan	Decision (Split)	3	5:00
Light Heavyweight	Rodney Wallace	def.	David Heath	Decision (Unanimous)	3	5:00
Catchweight (158 lb.)	Kajan Johnson	def.	Ryan Healy	Decision (Unanimous)	3	5:00
Catchweight (175 lb.)	Dhiego Lima	def.	Bill Fraser	KO (Punch)	2	2:36
Preliminary Card
Lightweight	Brad Cardinal	def.	Musa Toliver	Submission (Triangle Choke)	2	1:22
Catchweight (180 lb.)	Jordan Beecroft	def.	Nick Hrynchyshyn	Decision (Unanimous)	3	5:00
Featherweight	Spencer Rohovie	def.	Matt Veal	Submission (Armbar)	1	3:41

== See also ==
- Maximum Fighting Championship
- List of Maximum Fighting Championship events
