= 2011 in Maximum Fighting Championship =

Information
- First date: February 25, 2011
- Last date: October 7, 2011

Events
- Total events: 4

Fights
- Total fights: 34
- Title fights: 4

Chronology
2010 in MFC	2011 in Maximum Fighting Championship	2012 in MFC

The year 2011 is the 10th year in the history of the Maximum Fighting Championship, a mixed martial arts promotion based in Canada. In 2011 Maximum Fighting Championship held 4 events beginning with, MFC 28: Supremacy.

== Title fights ==
Title fights in 2011
Weight class				Method	Round	Time	Event	Notes
Light Heavyweight	Ryan Jimmo	def.	Dwayne Lewis	TKO (Doctor Stoppage)	3	3:13	MFC 28: Supremacy	(Note: For the MFC Light Heavyweight Championship)
Welterweight	Douglas Lima (c)	def.	Terry Martin	TKO (Punches)	1	1:14	MFC 29: Conquer	(Note: For the MFC Welterweight Championship)
Light Heavyweight	Ryan Jimmo (c)	def.	Zak Cummings	Decision (Unanimous)	5	5:00	MFC 29: Conquer	(Note: For the MFC Light Heavyweight Championship)
Light Heavyweight	Ryan Jimmo (c)	def.	Rameau Thierry Sokoudjou	Decision (Unanimous)	5	5:00	MFC 31: The Rundown	(Note: For the MFC Light Heavyweight Championship)

== Events list ==
#	Event title	Date	Arena	Location	Attendance
34	MFC 31: The Rundown	October 7, 2011	Mayfield Inn Trade and Conference Centre	Edmonton, Alberta	
33	MFC 30: Up Close & Personal	June 10, 2011	Mayfield Inn Trade and Conference Centre	Edmonton, Alberta	
32	MFC 29: Conquer	April 8, 2011	The Colosseum at Caesars Windsor	Windsor, Ontario	
31	MFC 28: Supremacy	February 25, 2011	River Cree Resort and Casino	Edmonton, Alberta	

== MFC 28: Supremacy ==
MFC 28: Supremacy was an event held on February 25, 2011 at the River Cree Resort and Casino in Edmonton, Alberta.

=== Results ===
Main Card
Weight class				Method	Round	Time	Notes
Light Heavyweight	Ryan Jimmo	def.	Dwayne Lewis	TKO (Doctor Stoppage)	3	3:13	(Note: For the MFC Light Heavyweight Championship)
	Drew Fickett	def.	Matt Veach	Submission (Armbar)	1	0:36
	Richie Whitson	def.	Curtis Demarce	Decision (Split)	3	5:00
	Thomas Denny	vs.	Sheldon Westcott	Draw (Split)	3	5:00
	Emanuel Newton	def.	Rodney Wallace	Submission (Rear-Naked Choke)	2	4:34
	Tyrone Glover	def.	Robert Washington	Decision (Split)	3	5:00
	Dan Ring	def.	Garret Nybakken	Submission (Rear-Naked Choke)	2	2:21
	Brendan Kornberger	def.	Paapa Inkumsah	Decision (Unanimous)	3	5:00

== MFC 29: Conquer ==
MFC 29: Conquer was an event held on April 8, 2011 at the Colosseum at Caesars Windsor in Windsor, Ontario.

=== Results ===
Main Card
Weight class				Method	Round	Time	Notes
Welterweight	Douglas Lima (c)	def.	Terry Martin	TKO (Punches)	1	1:14	(Note: For the MFC Welterweight Championship)
Light Heavyweight	Ryan Jimmo (c)	def.	Zak Cummings	Decision (Unanimous)	5	5:00	(Note: For the MFC Light Heavyweight Championship)
	Marcus Davis	def.	Curtis Demarce	Decision (Split)	3	5:00
	Hermes Franca	def.	Robert Washington	KO (Punches)	2	0:26
	Pete Spratt	def.	Demi Deeds	Submission (Armbar)	2	4:19
	Ali Mokdad	def.	Andreas Spang	Submission (Rear-Naked Choke)	1	1:35
	Dhiego Lima	def.	Josh Taveirne	Submission (Rear-Naked Choke)	3	3:35
	David Harris	def.	Chuck Mady	Submission (Rear-Naked Choke)	1	3:07
	Matthew Spisak	def.	Pete Brown	Decision (Unanimous)	3	5:00

== MFC 30: Up Close & Personal ==
MFC 30: Up Close & Personal was an event held on June 10, 2011 at the Mayfield Inn Trade and Conference Centre in Edmonton, Alberta.

=== Results ===
Main Card
Weight class				Method	Round	Time	Notes
	Brian Cobb	def.	Drew Fickett	TKO (Punches)	1	4:44
	Marcus Davis	def.	Pete Spratt	Decision (Unanimous)	3	5:00
	Sheldon Westcott	def.	Thomas Denny	Decision (Unanimous)	3	5:00
	Dhiego Lima	def.	Jamie Toney	KO (Punches)	1	2:47
	Curtis Demarce	def.	Robert Washington	Decision (Split)	3	5:00
	Andreas Spang	def.	Cody Krahn	Submission (Guillotine Choke)	1	1:18
	Mukai Maromo	def.	Scott Cleve	TKO (Punches)	1	0:36
	Garret Nybakken	def.	Jevon Marshall	TKO (Punches)	1	0:16

== MFC 31: The Rundown ==
MFC 31: The Rundown was an event held on October 7, 2011 at the Mayfield Inn Trade and Conference Centre in Edmonton, Alberta.

=== Results ===
Main Card
Weight class				Method	Round	Time	Notes
Light Heavyweight	Ryan Jimmo (c)	def.	Rameau Thierry Sokoudjou	Decision (Unanimous)	5	5:00	(Note: For the MFC Light Heavyweight Championship)
	Kajan Johnson	def.	Richie Whitson	Submission (Rear-Naked Choke)	1	3:52
	Adam Lynn	def.	Curtis Demarce	KO (Elbow)	1	1:38
	Mukai Maromo	def.	Sabah Fadai	Decision (Unanimous)	3	5:00
	Terry Martin	def.	Allen Hope	TKO (Punches and Elbows)	1	2:13
	Cody Krahn	def.	Ryan Chiappe	Submission (Guillotine Choke)	1	3:45
	Mike Froese	vs.	Dejan Kajic	NC (Froese Poked in the Eye)	1	0:31
	James Haddad	def.	Garret Nybakken	Submission (Guillotine Choke)	1	4:12
	Dan Ring	def.	Neal Anderson	Decision (Unanimous)	3	5:00

== See also ==
- List of Maximum Fighting Championship events
