= MFC 26 =

Maximum Fighting Championship MMA event in 2010

MFC 26: Retribution
- The poster for MFC 26: Retribution
- Promotion: Maximum Fighting Championship
- Date: September 10, 2010
- Venue: River Cree Casino
- City: Enoch, Alberta

Event chronology
MFC 25: Vindication	MFC 26: Retribution	MFC 27: Breaking Point

MFC 26: Retribution was a mixed martial arts event held by the Maximum Fighting Championship (MFC) on September 10, 2010, at the River Cree Casino in Enoch, Alberta. The event was aired live on HDNet with commentators Michael Schiavello, Frank Trigg and Guy Mezger.

== Background ==
This event featured an MFC Lightweight title fight between Antonio McKee and Luciano Azevedo. Prior to the fight, McKee declared that if Azevedo made it to a decision, then he would retire from mixed martial arts.

The event was originally scheduled to take place in Brandon, Manitoba, but was later moved to the regular venue of the River Cree Casino.

== Results ==
Main Card
Weight class				Method	Round	Time	Notes
Welterweight	Douglas Lima	def.	Ryan Ford	Submission (Armbar)	2	0:48
Lightweight	Antonio McKee (c)	def.	Luciano Azevedo	TKO (Doctor Stoppage)	1	3:11	(Note: For the MFC Lightweight Championship)
Middleweight	Jesse Taylor	def.	Tom Watson	Decision (Unanimous)	3	5:00
Light Heavyweight	Dwayne Lewis	def.	Mike Nickels	TKO (Punches)	1	1:30
Middleweight	David Heath	def.	Solomon Hutcherson	KO (Superman Punch)	2	3:46
Lightweight	Curtis Demarce	def.	Tyson Steele	Submission (Triangle Choke)	2	4:09
Preliminary Card
Middleweight	Ford Robertson	def.	Andrew Buckland	Decision (Unanimous)	3	5:00
Catchweight (179 lbs)	Aaron Berke	def.	Ryan Ballingall	Submission (Rear-Naked Choke)	2	0:35
Lightweight	Chad Freeman	def.	Theo Brisley	Submission (Armbar)	1	3:04

== See also ==
- Maximum Fighting Championship
- List of Maximum Fighting Championship events
- 2010 in Maximum Fighting Championship
