= MFC 27 =

Maximum Fighting Championship MMA event in 2010

MFC 27: Breaking Point
- Promotion: Maximum Fighting Championship
- Date: November 12, 2010
- Venue: River Cree Casino
- City: Enoch, Alberta

Event chronology
MFC 26: Retribution	MFC 27: Breaking Point	MFC 28: Supremacy

MFC 27: Breaking Point was a mixed martial arts event held by the Maximum Fighting Championship (MFC) on November 12, 2010 at the River Cree Casino in Enoch, Alberta.

== Background ==
This event featured an MFC Welterweight title fight between Douglas Lima and Jesse Juarez. It also aired on HDNet Fights.

Glover Teixeira was forced off the card due to visa problems, and was replaced with UFC veteran Rodney Wallace.

== Results ==
Main Card
Weight class				Method	Round	Time	Notes
Welterweight	Douglas Lima	def.	Jesse Juarez	Submission (Triangle Armbar)	3	2:37	(Note: For the MFC Welterweight Championship)
Welterweight	Ryan Ford	def.	Pete Spratt	Submission (Rear-Naked Choke)	2	3:07
Light Heavyweight	Dwayne Lewis	def.	Razak Al-Hassan	Decision (Split)	3	5:00
Light Heavyweight	Rodney Wallace	def.	David Heath	Decision (Unanimous)	3	5:00
Catchweight (158 lb.)	Kajan Johnson	def.	Ryan Healy	Decision (Unanimous)	3	5:00
Catchweight (175 lb.)	Dhiego Lima	def.	Bill Fraser	KO (Punch)	2	2:36
Preliminary Card
Lightweight	Brad Cardinal	def.	Musa Toliver	Submission (Triangle Choke)	2	1:22
Catchweight (180 lb.)	Jordan Beecroft	def.	Nick Hrynchyshyn	Decision (Unanimous)	3	5:00
Featherweight	Spencer Rohovie	def.	Matt Veal	Submission (Armbar)	1	3:41

== See also ==
- Maximum Fighting Championship
- List of Maximum Fighting Championship events
- 2010 in Maximum Fighting Championship
