= MFC 24 =

Maximum Fighting Championship MMA event in 2010

MFC 24: HeatXC
- Promotion: Maximum Fighting Championship
- Date: February 26, 2010
- Venue: River Cree Resort and Casino
- City: Enoch, Alberta

Event chronology
MFC 23: Unstoppable	MFC 24: HeatXC	MFC 25: Vindication

MFC 24: HeatXC was a mixed martial arts event to be held by the Maximum Fighting Championship (MFC) on February 26, 2010, at the River Cree Resort and Casino in Enoch, Alberta. The main event featured Yves Edwards taking on Derrick Noble in a lightweight bout. The event aired live on HDNet.

== Results ==
Main Card
Weight class				Method	Round	Time	Notes
Lightweight	Yves Edwards	def.	Derrick Noble	TKO (Punches)	1	4:44
Middleweight	Tom Watson	def.	Travis Galbraith	KO (Head Kick)	1	1:56
Light heavyweight	Dwayne Lewis	def.	Ryan McClain	TKO (Punches and Elbows)	2	2:08
Welterweight	Jesse Juarez	def.	Nathan Gunn	KO (Head Kick)	1	0:11
Welterweight	Dami Egbeyemi	def.	Paapa Inkumsah	Decision (Split)	3	5:00
Welterweight	David Letourneau	def.	Nick Hrynchyshyn	Decision (Unanimous)	3	5:00
Lightweight	Garret Nybakken	def.	Chris Barber	Submission (Rear-Naked Choke)	1	2:30
Light heavyweight	Zach Blaber	def.	Eric Chouinard	Submission (Kimura)	1	1:17

== See also ==
- Maximum Fighting Championship
- List of Maximum Fighting Championship events
- 2010 in Maximum Fighting Championship
