= Stanislav Nedkov =

Bulgarian mixed martial arts fighter

- Born: December 9, 1981 (age 44); Veliko Tarnovo, People's Republic of Bulgaria (today Bulgaria)
- Native name: Станислав Недков
- Other names: Stucky
- Nationality: Bulgarian
- Height: 5 ft 11 in (1.80 m)
- Weight: 205 lb (93 kg; 14 st 9 lb)
- Division: Light Heavyweight; Middleweight
- Reach: 71 in (180 cm)
- Fighting out of: Veliko Tarnovo, Bulgaria
- Team: Bulgarian Sports Federation MMA, (The) Scorpion MMA Club
- Rank: Black belt in Brazilian Jiu-Jitsu under Bruno Bastos
- Years active: 2006–2015

Mixed martial arts record
- Total: 15
- Wins: 12
- By knockout: 6
- By submission: 4
- By decision: 2
- Losses: 2
- By knockout: 1
- By submission: 1
- No contests: 1

Other information
- Website: www.stanislavnedkov.com
- Mixed martial arts record from Sherdog

Stanislav Nedkov (Bulgarian: Станислав Недков, born December 9, 1981) is a Bulgarian professional mixed martial artist, political scientist and philosopher. A professional since 2006, he has formerly competed for the UFC, World Victory Road, and Pancrase.

== Background ==
Nedkov was born in Veliko Tarnovo and began wrestling when he was 10 years old. A two-time national champion in freestyle wrestling, he has had first-place finishes in international tournaments in Russia, Moldova, Turkey, and Bulgaria. Nedkov has also studied in sumo under Kotooshu Katsunori and won his first grappling championship a year after he began learning Brazilian jiu-jitsu.

== Mixed martial arts career ==
=== Early career ===
Nedkov made his professional mixed martial arts debut in relative obscurity in 2006 and amassed an undefeated record of 7–0 in his native Bulgaria.

Following a year away from the sport, Nedkov signed a contract with the Japanese promotion World Victory Road.

=== Ultimate Fighting Championship ===
In June 2010, it was announced that Nedkov had signed a contract with the UFC. Nedkov was expected to make his UFC debut against Rodney Wallace on August 7, 2010, at UFC 117, but Nedkov was forced out of the bout with an injury and replaced by Phil Davis

Nedkov was expected to face Steve Cantwell on October 16, 2010, at UFC 120. However, less than 48 hours before the event, Cantwell was forced off the card after suffering a knee injury during a pre-fight training session. The bout was cancelled with no time to find a suitable opponent for Nedkov.

Nedkov eventually made his UFC debut against Luiz Cane at UFC 134. Nedkov won the fight via TKO (punches) in the first round.

Nedkov was scheduled to return to the UFC at UFC 142. He was expected to take on Fabio Maldonado at this event, however alleged visa problems forced Nedkov to withdraw from the bout.

Nedkov faced Thiago Silva on November 10, 2012, at UFC on Fuel TV 6. He lost via arm-triangle choke in the third round. However, on November 21, 2012, it was revealed that Silva had failed his post-fight drug test, testing positive for marijuana metabolites and the result was overturned and changed to a No Contest.

Nedkov made his Middleweight debut against Tom Watson on February 16, 2013, at UFC on Fuel TV: Barão vs. McDonald. He lost the back-and-forth fight via TKO in the second round. Both participants earned Fight of the Night honors for their performance.

Nedkov returned to the octagon against Nikita Krylov in a light heavyweight bout at UFC on Fox: Gustafsson vs. Johnson on January 24, 2015. He lost the fight via submission in the first round and was subsequently released from the promotion shortly after.

== Personal life ==
Nedkov married Bulgarian politician Yuliana Doncheva in 2010.

== Championships and accomplishments ==
- Ultimate Fighting Championship
  - Fight of the Night (One time) vs. Tom Watson
  - UFC.com Awards
    - 2011: Ranked #5 Upset of the Year vs. Luiz Cane

== Mixed martial arts record ==
Professional record breakdown
| 15 matches | 12 wins | 2 losses |
| By knockout | 6 | 1 |
| By submission | 4 | 1 |
| By decision | 2 | 0 |
| No contests | 1 | |

| Res. | Record | Opponent | Method | Event | Date | Round | Time | Location | Notes |
|---|---|---|---|---|---|---|---|---|---|
| Loss | 12–2 (1) | Nikita Krylov | Submission (standing guillotine choke) | UFC on Fox: Gustafsson vs. Johnson | January 24, 2015 | 1 | 1:24 | Stockholm, Sweden | Return to Light Heavyweight. |
| Loss | 12–1 (1) | Tom Watson | TKO (knees and punches) | UFC on Fuel TV: Barão vs. McDonald | February 16, 2013 | 2 | 4:42 | London, England | Middleweight debut. Fight of the Night |
| NC | 12–0 (1) | Thiago Silva | NC (overturned) | UFC on Fuel TV: Franklin vs. Le | November 10, 2012 | 3 | 1:45 | Macau, SAR, China | Originally submission (guillotine choke) loss; result overturned to a no contest after Silva failed his drug test. |
| Win | 12–0 | Luiz Cane | TKO (punches) | UFC 134 | August 27, 2011 | 1 | 4:13 | Rio de Janeiro, Brazil | |
| Win | 11–0 | Augustin Helgiu | Submission (rear-naked choke) | BMMAF: Warriors 13 | May 21, 2010 | 1 | 2:14 | Sofia, Bulgaria | |
| Win | 10–0 | Kevin Randleman | Decision (split) | World Victory Road Presents: Sengoku 11 | November 7, 2009 | 3 | 5:00 | Tokyo, Japan | |
| Win | 9–0 | Travis Wiuff | TKO (punches) | World Victory Road Presents: Sengoku 8 | May 2, 2009 | 3 | 0:42 | Tokyo, Japan | |
| Win | 8–0 | Masayuki Kono | TKO (punches) | Pancrase: Shining 10 | December 7, 2008 | 1 | 1:35 | Tokyo, Japan | |
| Win | 7–0 | Adelin Lutckanov | Submission (rear-naked choke) | MMA Bulgaria | October 19, 2007 | 1 | N/A | Veliko Tarnovo, Bulgaria | |
| Win | 6–0 | Goce Candovski | Decision (unanimous) | Shooto: Bulgaria | October 6, 2007 | 2 | 5:00 | Sofia, Bulgaria | |
| Win | 5–0 | Yanko Kolev | Submission (rear-naked choke) | Shooto: Bulgaria | October 2, 2007 | 1 | 2:38 | Sofia, Bulgaria | |
| Win | 4–0 | Kamen Georgiev | TKO (punches) | Shooto: Bulgaria | May 12, 2007 | 1 | 2:11 | Sofia, Bulgaria | |
| Win | 3–0 | Vladimir Shumanov | TKO (submission to punches) | Ichigeki: Bulgaria | March 25, 2007 | 1 | 1:16 | Varna Bulgaria | |
| Win | 2–0 | Krasimir Bonchev | TKO (punches) | The Day of the Champions | November 17, 2006 | 1 | 0:33 | Haskovo, Bulgaria | |
| Win | 1–0 | Iliyan Mitev | TKO (punches) | MMA Bulgaria | April 8, 2006 | 1 | N/A | Veliko Tarnovo, Bulgaria | |

== See also ==
- List of male mixed martial artists
