= Jesse Juarez =

American mixed martial arts fighter

- Born: May 8, 1981 (age 45); Torrance, California, U.S.
- Height: 6 ft 1 in (185 cm)
- Weight: 171 lb (78 kg; 12 st 3 lb)
- Division: Welterweight; Middleweight
- Reach: 77 in (196 cm)
- Fighting out of: Torrance, California, U.S.
- Team: Bodyshop Fitness Team
- Wrestling: NAIA Wrestling
- Years active: 2006–2016

Mixed martial arts record
- Total: 34
- Wins: 23
- By knockout: 6
- By submission: 8
- By decision: 8
- Unknown: 1
- Losses: 11
- By knockout: 3
- By submission: 6
- By decision: 2

Other information
- University: Montana State University–Northern; Golden West College
- Notable school: North Torrance High School
- Mixed martial arts record from Sherdog
Medal record
Men's collegiate wrestling
Representing Montana State–Northern
NAIA Championships
Gold medal – first place	2005 Sioux City	184 lb

Jesse Juarez (born May 8, 1981) is an American former mixed martial artist. A professional competitor since 2006, Juarez has also formerly competed for Absolute Championship Berkut, Strikeforce, Bellator MMA, Maximum Fighting Championship, and Shark Fights. He holds a win at Welterweight over former UFC Middleweight champion Robert Whittaker.

== Background ==
Originally from Torrance, California, Juarez is of French, Italian, and Tongan descent. Juarez attended North Torrance High School where he competed in wrestling, football, and track and field, earning NHSCA High School All-American honors for wrestling after being the California state runner-up. Juarez later continued his wrestling career at Golden West College where he was a JUCO All-American and California JC state champion before transferring to Montana State University-Northern. Juarez was a two-time NAIA All-American and was a 2005 NAIA National Champion at Montana State University-Northern. Juarez had been introduced to mixed martial arts while wrestling in high school and later transitioned into mixed martial arts after college.

== Mixed martial arts career ==
=== Early career ===
Juarez started his professional career in 2006. He fought mainly for California-based promotions as Strikeforce, Gladiator Challenge and Invincible.

He faced Luke Stewart on September 20, 2008, at Strikeforce: At The Mansion II. He lost via submission due to an armbar in the first round.

=== Bellator MMA ===
Juarez made his promotional debut against Mikey Gomez on April 10, 2009, at Bellator 2. He won via TKO in the first round.

Juarez next faced Deray Davis on May 15, 2009, at Bellator 7–8. Once again he won via TKO in round one.

Juarez did a rematch against Mikey Gomez on June 5, 2009, at Bellator 10. He won via unanimous decision (30–27, 30–27, 30–27).

=== Maximum Fighting Championship and Cage Fighting Championship ===
Juarez made his promotional debut in MFC against Joe Christopher on December 4, 2009, at MFC 23. He won via unanimous decision.

Juarez faced Nathan Gunn on February 26, 2010, at MFC 24. He won via knockout with a head kick at 11 seconds of round one.

Juarez made his promotional debut in Cage Fighting Championship against Justin Murray on April 16, 2010, at CFC 13 for the welterweight title. Juarez defeated Murray via majority decision (49–47, 48–48, 48–47) after five rounds and became the CFC welterweight title holder.

Juarez faced Douglas Lima on November 12, 2010, at MFC 27 for the MFC Welterweight Championship. He lost via submission due to a triangle armbar in the third round.

Juarez defended his CFC Welterweight Championship against Manuel Rodriguez on August 26, 2011, at CFC 18. He defeated Rodriguez via unanimous decision (50–45, 50–45, 49–47) after five rounds to retain his belt.

Juarez defended the CFC Championship against Robert Whittaker on May 18, 2012, at CFC 21. He defeated Whittaker via unanimous decision (49–46, 48–47, 48–47) after five rounds to retain the title.

=== Return to Bellator MMA ===
In 2013, Juarez returned to Bellator MMA. He faced Jordan Smith on February 21, 2013, at Bellator 90. He won via split decision (30–27, 29–28, 28–29) after a hard-fought match.

Juarez faced Joe Williams on November 2, 2013, at Bellator 106. He won via submission due to a guillotine choke in the very first round.

Juarez was scheduled to face Andrey Koreshkov in the quarterfinal match of Bellator season ten welterweight tournament on March 14, 2014, at Bellator 112. However, after the removal of other tournament competitors citing injuries, the tournament line-up was shifted and Juarez instead faced Adam McDonough. He lost the fight via unanimous decision.

Juarez faced Ron Keslar on September 19, 2014, at Bellator 125. He won the fight via unanimous decision.

Juarez was expected to face Brennan Ward at Bellator 134 on February 27, 2015. However, Ward was moved up to the main card to face Curtis Millender after Millender's opponent, Michael Page, pulled out of the fight due to a cut over his left eye. Juarez was removed from the fight card as a result.

Juarez faced Ricky Rainey at Bellator 137 on May 15, 2015. He lost the fight via knockout in the second round.

In June 2015, it was revealed that Juarez and 7 other fighters were released from the promotion.

=== Absolute Championship Berkut ===
Juarez faced Beslan Isaev on May 6, 2016, at ACB 35. He lost the fight via submission in the first round.

== Championships and accomplishments ==
=== Amateur wrestling ===
- National Association of Intercollegiate Athletics
  - NAIA All-American out of Montana State University–Northern (2004, 2005)
  - NAIA National Championship 184 lb: Champion out of Montana State University–Northern (2005)
  - NAIA National Championship 174 lb: 5th place out of Montana State University–Northern (2004)
  - NAIA North Region Championship 174 lb: Champion out of Montana State University–Northern (2004)
- California Community College Athletic Association
  - CCCAA State Championship 184 lb: Champion out of Golden West College (2001)
- National High School Coaches Association
  - NHSCA All-American out of North Torrance High School (2000)
  - NHSCA Senior Nationals 171 lb: 7th place out of North Torrance High School (2000)

=== Mixed martial arts ===
- Cage Fighting Championship
  - CFC Welterweight Championship (One time)
  - Two successful title defenses
- Invincible
  - Invincible Middleweight Championship (One time)
  - Invincible Welterweight Championship (One time)

== Mixed martial arts record ==
Professional record breakdown
36 matches	23 wins	13 losses
By knockout	6	4
By submission	8	7
By decision	8	2
Unknown	1	0

Res.	Record	Opponent	Method	Event	Date	Round	Time	Location	Notes
Loss	23–13	Alexei Ivanov	TKO (punches)	League S-70: Plotforma 7th	August 27, 2016	1	4:30	Sochi, Krasnodar krai, Russia	Catchweight (181 lbs) bout.
Loss	23–12	Beslan Isaev	Submission (armbar)	ACB 35: In Memory of Guram Gugenishvili	May 6, 2016	1	4:44	Tbilisi, Georgia	
Win	23–11	Frank Schuman	Submission (arm triangle choke)	KOTC: Title At The Torch	October 17, 2015	1	3:47	Lac du Flambeau, Wisconsin, United States	
Loss	22–11	Ricky Rainey	KO (knee)	Bellator 137	May 15, 2015	2	1:13	Temecula, California, United States	
Loss	22–10	Khusein Khaliev	Submission (choke)	Battle in Grozny	March 14, 2015	1	N/A	Grozny, Russia	
Win	22–9	Ron Keslar	Decision (unanimous)	Bellator 125	September 19, 2014	3	5:00	Fresno, California, United States	
Loss	21–9	Adam McDonough	Decision (unanimous)	Bellator 112	March 14, 2014	3	5:00	Hammond, Indiana, United States	Bellator Season Ten Welterweight Tournament Quarterfinals.
Win	21–8	Joe Williams	Submission (guillotine choke)	Bellator 106	November 2, 2013	1	0:57	Long Beach, California, United States	
Win	20–8	Daniel McWilliams	TKO (punches)	BAMMA USA: Badbeat 10	August 9, 2013	1	2:24	Commerce, California, United States	
Win	19–8	Jordan Smith	Decision (split)	Bellator 90	February 21, 2013	3	5:00	Salt Lake City, Utah, United States	
Win	18–8	Robert Whittaker	Decision (unanimous)	Cage Fighting Championship 21	May 18, 2012	5	5:00	Sydney, Australia	Defended CFC Welterweight Championship.
Loss	17–8	Leandro Silva	TKO (doctor stoppage)	EFWC: The Untamed 2	March 30, 2012	1	5:00	Anaheim, California, United States	
Win	17–7	Gadji Zaipulaev	Submission (rear-naked choke)	FEFoMP: Battle of Empires 1	December 17, 2011	2	2:15	Khabarovsk, Russia	
Win	16–7	Manuel Rodriguez	Decision (unanimous)	CFC 18: Juarez vs. Rodriguez	August 26, 2011	5	5:00	Sydney, Australia	Defended CFC Welterweight Championship.
Loss	15–7	Josh Neer	TKO (injury)	Shark Fights 16: Neer vs. Juarez	June 25, 2011	1	5:00	Odessa, Texas, United States	
Loss	15–6	Douglas Lima	Submission (triangle armbar)	MFC 27	November 12, 2010	3	2:37	Enoch, Alberta, Canada	For inaugural MFC Welterweight Championship.
Win	15–5	Justin Murray	Decision (majority)	Cage Fighting Championships 13	April 16, 2010	5	5:00	Southport, Queensland, Australia	Won CFC Welterweight Championship.
Win	14–5	Mauro Chimento Jr.	Submission (rear-naked choke)	Collision in the Cage	March 20, 2010	3	1:42	Irvine, California, United States	
Win	13–5	Nathan Gunn	KO (head kick)	MFC 24	February 26, 2010	1	0:11	Enoch, Alberta, Canada	
Win	12–5	Joe Christopher	Decision (unanimous)	MFC 23	December 4, 2009	3	5:00	Enoch, Alberta, Canada	
Win	11–5	Mikey Gomez	Decision (unanimous)	Bellator 10	June 5, 2009	3	5:00	Ontario, California, United States	Catchweight (175 lbs) bout.
Win	10–5	Deray Davis	TKO (punches)	Bellator 7–8	May 15, 2009	2	4:47	Chicago, Illinois, United States	
Win	9–5	Mikey Gomez	TKO (punches)	Bellator 2	April 10, 2009	1	4:23	Uncasville, Connecticut, United States	
Win	8–5	John Fleming	Submission (guillotine choke)	Colosseo Championship Fighting	March 6, 2009	1	0:46	Edmonton, Alberta, Canada	
Win	7–5	Thomas Kenney	Submission (punches)	Long Beach Fight Night 3	January 4, 2009	2	2:07	Long Beach, California, United States	
Loss	6–5	Luke Stewart	Submission (armbar)	Strikeforce: At The Mansion II	September 20, 2008	1	4:55	Beverly Hills, California, United States	
Win	6–4	John Walsh	TKO	Long Beach Fight Night 1	August 17, 2008	1	2:14	Long Beach, California, United States	
Loss	5–4	Bret Bergmark	Decision (unanimous)	Iroquois MMA Championships 3	April 26, 2008	3	5:00	Iroquois, Ontario, Canada	
Win	5–3	Erik Meaders	Submission (verbal)	Invincible MMA	March 8, 2008	4	0:51	Ontario, California, United States	Won Invincible Welterweight Championship.
Loss	4–3	Casey Ryan	Submission (triangle choke)	TC 25: Fight Club	December 15, 2007	1	2:27	San Diego, California, United States	
Loss	4–2	Fabio Nascimento	Submission (punches)	EFWC: The Untamed	October 6, 2007	1	4:50	Anaheim, California, United States	
Win	4–1	Robert Sarkozi	N/A	GC 69: Bad Intentions	September 22, 2007	1	N/A	Sacramento, California, United States	
Win	3–1	Jaime Fletcher	Decision (unanimous)	Invincible 4: It's All About the Action	July 21, 2007	5	N/A	Ontario, California, United States	Won Invincible Middleweight Championship.
Win	2–1	Jacob Nudel	Submission (armbar)	Total Fighting Alliance 6	April 28, 2007	1	1:02	Santa Monica, California, United States	
Loss	1–1	Bryan Baker	Submission (rear-naked choke)	Chaos in the Cage 2	April 6, 2007	3	1:38	San Bernardino, California, United States	
Win	1–0	Guillermo Smith	KO	Extreme Full Contact 3	October 14, 2006	1	0:43	Mexicali, Baja California, Mexico	
