= Yuliana Doncheva =

- Yulianna Doncheva in 2001

Personal details
- Born: 25 June 1965 (age 61) Shumen, Bulgaria
- Spouse: Stanislav Nedkov
- Education: University of Architecture, Civil Engineering and Geodesy, University of National and World Economy
- Profession: Politician, Television Host

Yuliana Doncheva Petkova (Bulgarian: Юлияна Дончева Петкова; born 25 June 1965) is a Bulgarian politician, businesswoman and television personality.

== Life ==
Born in Shumen, Doncheva is a graduate of the University of Architecture, Civil Engineering and Geodesy, where her specialty was "Geodesy, Cartography and Photogrammetry". She also earned a degree in "European Integration and International Economic Relations" from the UNWE.

Between 2001 and 2005, Doncheva sat in the National Parliament as a member of the NDSV, being vice-chairperson of the parliamentary group of the party. She subsequently entered the ranks of the New Age (Bulgarian: Новото Време) party, remaining part of it until August 2012.

Doncheva is married to mixed martial artist Stanislav Nedkov.
