= Mikey Gomez =

Carlos Michael Gomez
- Born: Carlos Michael Gomez; May 8, 1982 (age 44); Ciudad del Este, Paraguay
- Other names: Mikey
- Height: 6 ft 1 in (1.85 m)
- Weight: 186 lb (84 kg; 13.3 st)
- Division: Light Heavyweight; Middleweight; Welterweight
- Reach: 76.5 in (194 cm)
- Stance: Orthodox
- Fighting out of: Temecula, California, United States
- Team: Gracie Barra Diamond Bar; Reign MMA
- Rank: Second degree black belt in Brazilian Jiu-Jitsu
- Years active: 2005–2015

Mixed martial arts record
- Total: 30
- Wins: 17
- By knockout: 3
- By submission: 12
- By decision: 2
- Losses: 13
- By knockout: 3
- By submission: 4
- By decision: 6

Other information
- Mixed martial arts record from Sherdog

Carlos Michael "Mikey" Gomez (born May 8, 1982) is a Paraguayian former mixed martial artist. A professional from 2005 until 2015, he competed for Bellator, EliteXC, Cage Warriors, XFC, and RFA.

== Mixed martial arts career ==
=== Early career ===
After compiling a 2-0 amateur record in 2004, Gomez made his professional debut against 14-2-1 future UFC veteran Carlo Prater in February 2005. Gomez was defeated via unanimous decision after two rounds. After amassing a 6-3 record, Gomez was signed by EliteXC.

=== EliteXC ===
Gomez made his promotional debut at EliteXC: Street Certified, losing via unanimous decision in an upset to 1-1 Eric Bradley. After two wins in other promotions, he returned at EliteXC: Heat in October 2008, defeating then-undefeated Italian fighter Lorenzo Borgomeo via second-round armbar submission.

After the financial collapse of EliteXC in 2008, Gomez was signed by Bellator in 2009.

=== Bellator ===
Gomez made his promotional debut at Bellator 2 in May 2009 against Jesse Juarez. Gomez lost via first-round TKO.

He returned to face Juarez in a rematch at Bellator 10, losing again via unanimous decision.

After consecutive losses and falling to 9-7, Gomez faced War Machine (then known as Jon Coppenhaver) for the Xtreme Fighting Championships promotion. Gomez was defeated via third-round TKO. He returned to Bellator at Bellator 13 in May 2010, set to make his Middleweight debut. However, Gomez missed weight (187 lbs). Gomez won via unanimous decision.

=== Post-Bellator ===
Gomez went 7-5 in his next 12 fights, last appearing in 2015; a 26-second TKO loss.

== Championships and accomplishments ==
- Cage Warriors Fighting Championship
  - CWFC Welterweight Championship (One time)

== Mixed martial arts record ==
Professional record breakdown
30 matches	17 wins	13 losses
By knockout	3	3
By submission	12	4
By decision	2	6

Res.	Record	Opponent	Method	Event	Date	Round	Time	Location	Notes
Loss	17–13	Justin Polendey	TKO (punches)	The Main Event	August 1, 2015	1	0:26	San Diego, California, United States	
Loss	17–12	Dominic Waters	Decision (unanimous)	RFA 23: Murphy vs. Ware	February 6, 2015	3	5:00	Costa Mesa, California, United States	Welterweight bout.
Loss	17–11	Francisco France	Submission (arm-triangle choke)	RFA 21: Juusola vs. Baghdad	December 5, 2014	1	1:43	Costa Mesa, California, United States	Return to Middleweight.
Win	17–10	Khadzhimurat Bestaev	Submission (rear-naked choke)	Gladiator Challenge: Glove Up	October 4, 2014	2	1:30	San Jacinto, California, United States	Light Heavyweight debut; won the vacant Gladiator Challenge Middleweight Championship.
Loss	16–10	Jaime Jara	Submission (front choke)	Gladiator Challenge: Revenge	June 7, 2014	N/A	N/A	Lincoln, California, United States	For the Gladiator Challenge Middleweight Championship.
Win	16–9	Donald Palmer	TKO (punches)	Gladiator Challenge: Slug Fest	December 28, 2013	1	0:40	San Jacinto, California, United States	
Win	15–9	Ronald LeBreton Jr.	Submission (armbar)	BAMMA USA: Badbeat 9	May 31, 2013	1	1:37	Commerce, California, United States	
Win	14–9	David Johnson	Submission (arm-triangle choke)	Xplode Fight Series: Devastation	May 18, 2013	1	2:10	San Pasqual Valley, California, United States	
Win	13–9	Edward Darby	Submission (armbar)	Xplode Fight Series: Revancha	March 16, 2013	1	0:53	San Pasqual Valley, California, United States	
Loss	12–9	Josh Samman	TKO (submission to punches)	XFC 16: High Stakes	February 10, 2012	1	3:37	Knoxville, Tennessee, United States	
Win	12–8	Mike Bernhard	Submission (rear naked choke)	XFC 14: Resurrection	October 21, 2011	2	3:50	Orlando, Florida, United States	Gomez missed weight (187 lbs).
Win	11–8	James Brasco	TKO (submission to punches)	World Extreme Fighting 46	April 22, 2011	1	4:33	Orlando, Florida, United States	Middleweight debut.
Win	10–8	Moyses Gabin	Decision (unanimous)	Bellator 13	April 8, 2010	3	5:00	Hollywood, Florida, United States	Catchweight (187 lbs) bout; Gomez missed weight.
Loss	9–8	War Machine	TKO (punches)	XFC 9: Evolution	September 5, 2009	3	0:19	Tampa, Florida, United States	
Loss	9–7	Jesse Juarez	Decision (unanimous)	Bellator 10	June 5, 2009	3	5:00	Ontario, California, United States	Catchweight (175 lbs) bout.
Loss	9–6	Jesse Juarez	TKO (punches)	Bellator 2	April 10, 2009	1	4:23	Uncasville, Connecticut, United States	
Loss	9–5	André Galvão	Submission (armbar)	FSC: Evolution	December 14, 2008	1	3:59	Hagersville, Ontario, Canada	
Win	9–4	Lorenzo Borgomeo	Submission (armbar)	EliteXC: Heat	October 4, 2008	2	4:06	Sunrise, Florida, United States	
Win	8–4	Charles Blanchard	Submission (triangle choke)	Cage Warriors: USA Unleashed	August 23, 2008	1	2:01	Orlando, Florida, United States	Won the CWFC Welterweight Championship.
Win	7–4	Antonio Grant	TKO (strikes)	XFC 4: Judgment in the Cage	June 28, 2008	1	0:27	Tampa, Florida, United States	
Loss	6–4	Eric Bradley	Decision (unanimous)	EliteXC: Street Certified	February 16, 2008	3	5:00	Miami, Florida, United States	
Win	6–3	Justin Haskins	Submission (triangle choke)	WEF: King of the Streets	December 1, 2007	2	N/A	Kissimmee, Florida, United States	
Win	5–3	Esteban Ramos	Decision (split)	Knight Fight	October 27, 2007	3	N/A	Orlando, Florida, United States	
Loss	4–3	Glenn Mincer	Decision (unanimous)	World Extreme Fighting 8	August 10, 2007	3	5:00	Kissimmee, Florida, United States	
Win	4–2	Shawn Gay	Submission (rear-naked choke)	Combat Fighting Championship 2	September 23, 2006	2	1:47	Orlando, Florida, United States	
Win	3–2	Jeremy May	Submission (armbar)	Combat Fighting Championship 1	July 15, 2006	2	1:49	Orlando, Florida, United States	
Win	2–2	Matt Brown	Submission (rear-naked choke)	Absolute Fighting Championships 17	June 24, 2006	1	3:35	Florida, United States	
Win	1–2	Tim Stout	Submission (triangle choke)	Absolute Fighting Championships 16	April 22, 2006	1	3:30	Boca Raton, Florida, United States	
Loss	0–2	Rick Delvecchio	Decision (unanimous)	Absolute Fighting Championships 13	July 30, 2005	2	5:00	Fort Lauderdale, Florida, United States	
Loss	0–1	Carlo Prater	Decision	Absolute Fighting Championships 11	February 12, 2005	2	5:00	Fort Lauderdale, Florida, United States	

== See also ==
List of male mixed martial artists
