= 2005 in Maximum Fighting Championship =

Information
- First date: September 9, 2005
- Last date: September 9, 2005

Events
- Total events: 1

Fights
- Total fights: 10

Chronology
2003 in MFC	2005 in Maximum Fighting Championship	2006 in MFC

The year 2005 is the 5th year in the history of the Maximum Fighting Championship, a mixed martial arts promotion based in Canada. In 2005 Maximum Fighting Championship held 1 event, MFC 8: Resurrection.

== Events list ==
#	Event title	Date	Arena	Location	Attendance
9	MFC 8: Resurrection	September 9, 2005	Shaw Conference Centre	Edmonton, Alberta	

== MFC 8: Resurrection ==
MFC 8: Resurrection was an event held on September 9, 2005 at the Shaw Conference Centre in Edmonton, Alberta, Canada.

=== Results ===
Main Card
Weight class				Method	Round	Time	Notes
	Jason Macdonald	def.	Chris Fontaine	Submission (Rear Naked Choke)	2	2:12
	Victor Valimaki	def.	Dan Severn	Decision (Unanimous)	3	5:00
	Blake Fredrickson	def.	Kevin Manderson	TKO (Punches)	1	3:33
	Travis Galbraith	def.	Chris Wilson	TKO (Punches)	1	0:22
	Wilf Betz	def.	Mike Bell	Submission (Exhaustion)	3	2:37
	Kevin Dolan	def.	Nick Perry	Submission (Guillotine Choke)	1	0:32
	Chris Ade	def.	Kyle Cheyne	Submission (Armbar)	1	0:47
	Jordan McKay	def.	Graydon Tannas	Submission (Armbar)	2	1:20
	Craig Sloan	def.	Yoosef Penny	Submission (Armbar)	1	4:42
	Darren Appels	def.	Jim Dobson	KO	1	2:26

== See also ==
- Maximum Fighting Championship
- List of Maximum Fighting Championship events
