= MFC 23 =

Maximum Fighting Championship MMA event in 2009

MFC 23: Unstoppable
- Promotion: Maximum Fighting Championship
- Date: December 4th, 2009
- Venue: River Cree Resort and Casino
- City: Enoch, Alberta

Event chronology
MFC 22: Payoff	MFC 23: Unstoppable	MFC 24: HeatXC

MFC 23: Unstoppable was a mixed martial arts event held by the Maximum Fighting Championship (MFC) on December 4, 2009, at the River Cree Resort and Casino in Enoch, Alberta. The main event featured former UFC contender Thales Leites taking on fellow UFC veteran Dean Lister. The co-main event featured Jason MacDonald taking on Solomon Hutcherson. The event aired live on HDNet.

== Fight Card ==
Main Card
Weight class				Method	Round	Time	Notes
Middleweight	Thales Leites	def.	Dean Lister	Decision (Unanimous)	3	5:00
Middleweight	Jason MacDonald	def.	Emanuel Newton	Decision (Unanimous)	3	5:00	(Note: This fight was originally scored a split draw (28–28, 29–28, 28–29), but it turned out to be an error on the judges scorecard, the mistake was later fixed, and MacDonald was, in fact, awarded the victory.)
Middleweight	Bryan Baker	def.	Art Santore	Decision (Unanimous)	3	5:00
Light Heavyweight	Dwayne Lewis	def.	Marvin Eastman	KO (Punch)	1	4:58
Welterweight	Jesse Juarez	def.	Joe Christopher	Decision (Unanimous)	3	5:00
Heavyweight	Nick Penner	def.	Ryan Fortin	Submission (Rear-Naked Choke)	2	3:31
Lightweight	Ryan Machan	def.	Kajan Johnson	Submission (Rear-Naked Choke)	1	3:30
Lightweight	Billy Hua	def.	Kenny Hamilton	TKO (Punches)	2	0:20

== See also ==
- Maximum Fighting Championship
- List of Maximum Fighting Championship events
- 2009 in Maximum Fighting Championship
