= 2003 in Maximum Fighting Championship =

Information
- First date: February 22, 2003
- Last date: May 31, 2003

Events
- Total events: 2

Fights
- Total fights: 17

Chronology
2002 in MFC	2003 in Maximum Fighting Championship	2005 in MFC

The year 2003 is the 3rd year in the history of the Maximum Fighting Championship, a mixed martial arts promotion based in Canada. In 2003 Maximum Fighting Championship held 2 events beginning with, MFC 6: Road To Gold.

== Events list ==
#	Event Title	Date	Arena	Location	Attendance
8	MFC 7: Undisputed	May 31, 2003	Arctic Ice Centre	Slave Lake, Alberta	
7	MFC 6: Road To Gold	February 22, 2003	Exhibition Park	Lethbridge, Alberta	

== MFC 6: Road To Gold ==
MFC 6: Road To Gold was an event held on February 22, 2003 at Exhibition Park in Lethbridge, Alberta, Canada.

=== Results ===
Main Card
Weight class				Method	Round	Time	Notes
	Jason MacDonald	def.	Jeromie Sills	Submission (Triangle Choke)	1	1:54
	Ulysses Castro	def.	Dan Severn	Decision	3	5:00
	Jason St. Louis	def.	Brandon Olsen	Submission (Kimura)	0	N/A
	Bill Mahood	def.	Shane Biever	TKO (Knees)	1	N/A
	Blake Fredrickson	def.	Justin Bruckmann	Submission (Toe Hold)	1	3:23
	Yan Pellerin	def.	Chris Peak	KO (Elbow)	1	N/A
	Travis Galbraith	def.	Steve Thurston	KO (Punches)	0	N/A
	Quenton Pongracz	def.	Jason Tatlow	Submission (Keylock)	0	N/A
	Chad Hamzeh	def.	Kajan Johnson	TKO (Punches)	0	N/A

== MFC 7: Undisputed ==
MFC 7: Undisputed was an event held on May 31, 2003 at The Arctic Ice Centre in Slave Lake, Alberta, Canada.

=== Results ===
Main Card
Weight class				Method	Round	Time	Notes
	Bill Mahood	def.	Jason MacDonald	TKO (Punches)	2	3:02
	Jason St. Louis	def.	Brandon Olsen	Submission (Triangle Choke)	1	4:00
	Blake Fredrickson	def.	Chad Hamzeh	Decision (Unanimous)	3	5:00
	Shawn Peters	def.	Brian Reaman	Submission (Armbar)	1	N/A
	Keath Weafer	def.	Billy Kim	TKO (Punches)	2	N/A
	Travis Galbraith	def.	Kevin Dolan	Submission (Guillotine Choke)	1	N/A
	Chris Peak	def.	Cain Spalding	Submission (Heel Hook)	1	0:54
	Kajan Johnson	def.	Jeremy Whittingham	Decision (Unanimous)	2	5:00

== See also ==
- Maximum Fighting Championship
- List of Maximum Fighting Championship events
