= Ryan Healy =

American martial artist (born 1983)

- Born: July 20, 1983 (age 43); St. Louis, Missouri, U.S.
- Other names: Diamond; The Irish Assassin
- Height: 6 ft 0 in (1.83 m)
- Weight: 158 lb (72 kg; 11.3 st)
- Division: Welterweight; Lightweight
- Stance: Orthodox
- Fighting out of: Portland, Oregon, U.S.
- Team: Team Quest
- Years active: 2002–present

Mixed martial arts record
- Total: 39
- Wins: 25
- By knockout: 13
- By submission: 6
- By decision: 6
- Losses: 13
- By knockout: 4
- By submission: 1
- By decision: 9
- Draws: 1
- No contests: 0

Other information
- Mixed martial arts record from Sherdog

Ryan Healy (born July 20, 1983) is a retired American professional mixed martial artist who has competed for many promotions including Strikeforce, WEC, Shine Fights, and Full Contact Fighting Federation. He is also the twin brother of mixed-martial artist and Team Quest teammate Pat Healy.

== Mixed martial arts career ==
=== Bellator ===
After Rob Sinclair injured his knee and was forced out of his lightweight tournament fight, Sinclair was replaced by Ricardo Tirloni and Healy took Tirloni's spot and faced Marcin Held at Bellator 101. He lost the fight via knockout in the first round. the diamond is forever known.

== Mixed martial arts record ==
Professional record breakdown
40 matches	25 wins	14 losses
By knockout	13	4
By submission	6	1
By decision	6	9
Draws	1	

Res.	Record	Opponent	Method	Event	Date	Round	Time	Location	Notes
Loss	25–14–1	Andrew McInnes	Submission (rear-naked choke)	MFC 41: All In	October 3, 2014	1	2:49	Edmonton, Alberta, Canada	
Win	25–13–1	Aaron Hedrick	TKO (punches)	WFC 25: Brawl at the Beach	July 26, 2014	2	3:13	Lincoln City, Oregon, United States	
Win	24–13–1	Alex Ricci	Decision (split)	PFC 2	March 8, 2014	3	5:00	London, Ontario, Canada	
Loss	23–13–1	Marcin Held	KO (punches)	Bellator 101	September 27, 2013	1	1:12	Portland, Oregon, United States	
Loss	23–12–1	Jesse Ronson	Decision (unanimous)	Score Fighting Series 7	November 23, 2012	3	5:00	Hamilton, Ontario, Canada	
Win	23–11–1	Paul Kelly	Decision (unanimous)	SFL 2	April 7, 2012	3	5:00	Chandigarh, India	
Loss	22–11–1	John Alessio	Decision (unanimous)	Score Fighting Series 4	March 16, 2012	3	5:00	Hamilton, Ontario, Canada	
Win	22–10–1	Andrew Chappelle	Decision (split)	SportFight 30: Limitless	October 22, 2011	3	5:00	Gresham, Oregon, United States	Catchweight (160 lb) bout.
Win	21–10–1	James Birdsley	TKO (punches)	FNE- Round 14: Combat at the Cabaret	April 2, 2011	2	1:04	Anacortes, Washington, United States	
Loss	20–10–1	Vener Galiev	TKO (punches)	Fight Festival 30	March 12, 2010	1	0:43	Helsinki, Uusimaa, Finland	
Loss	20–9–1	Kajan Johnson	Decision (unanimous)	MFC 27	November 12, 2010	3	5:00	Enoch, Alberta, Canada	Catchweight (158 lb) bout; Healy missed weight.
Win	20–8–1	Eddie Pelczynski	Decision (unanimous)	CageSport 12	October 2, 2010	3	5:00	Tacoma, Washington, United States	
Win	19–8–1	Charon Spain	Submission (rear-naked choke)	Conquest of the Cage 9	September 8, 2010	2	N/A	Airway Heights, Washington, United States	
Win	18–8–1	Lance Wipf	Decision (split)	Budo Fights 2: Evolution	August 21, 2010	3	5:00	Bend, Oregon, United States	
Win	17–8–1	Dave Courchaine	KO (knee)	CageSport 11	July 24, 2010	1	3:20	Tacoma, Washington, United States	
Win	16–8–1	Jai Bradney	TKO (doctor stoppage)	CFC 12: Lombard vs. Santore	March 12, 2010	2	5:00	Sydney, Australia	
Win	15–8–1	Rod Montoya	TKO (punches)	Hoosier FC 1: Raise Up	November 20, 2009	1	4:59	Valparaiso, Indiana, United States	
Loss	14–8–1	Lloyd Woodard	Decision (unanimous)	Cage Sport 7	October 3, 2009	3	5:00	Tacoma, Washington, United States	
Loss	14–7–1	Luiz Firmino	Decision (unanimous)	Shine Fights 2: ATT vs. The World	September 4, 2009	3	5:00	Miami, Florida, United States	
Loss	14–6–1	Jameel Massouh	Decision (unanimous)	Evolution MMA	October 4, 2008	3	5:00	Phoenix, Arizona, United States	
Loss	14–5–1	Rick Story	Decision (unanimous)	EWC: May Massacre	May 10, 2008	5	5:00	Salem, Oregon, United States	Welterweight bout; for the EWC Welterweight Championship.
Loss	14–4–1	Jorge Masvidal	Decision (unanimous)	Strikeforce: At The Dome	February 23, 2008	3	5:00	Tacoma, Washington, United States	Catchweight (160 lb) bout.
Win	14–3–1	Ryan Bixler	TKO (punches)	Ringside Ticket	August 30, 2007	1	0:45	Highland, California, United States	
Win	13–3–1	Robbie Shamrock	TKO (punches)	Elite Warriors Championship	August 11, 2007	2	0:20	Portland, Oregon, United States	Welterweight bout.
Loss	12–3–1	Rob McCullough	TKO (cut)	WEC 21: Tapout	June 15, 2006	1	1:52	Highland, California, United States	
Win	12–2–1	Phillip Wyman	Submission (rear-naked choke)	WEC 19: Undisputed	March 17, 2006	1	3:18	Lemoore, California, United States	
Loss	11–2–1	Billy Evangelista	TKO (punches and elbows)	WEC 18: Unfinished Business	January 13, 2006	2	2:06	Lemoore, California, United States	
Draw	11–1–1	Diego Saraiva	Draw	Absolute Fighting Championships 14	December 10, 2005	2	5:00	Fort Lauderdale, Florida, United States	
Win	11–1	Adam Torres	Submission (armbar)	KOTC: Execution Day	October 29, 2005	1	3:50	Reno, Nevada, United States	
Win	10–1	Adam Torres	Submission (armbar)	UCF: Night of Champions	August 27, 2005	N/A	N/A	Medford, Oregon, United States	Return to Lightweight.
Win	9–1	Ed Nuno	TKO (doctor stoppage)	SF 11: Rumble at the Rose Garden	July 9, 2005	3	3:28	Portland, Oregon, United States	Welterweight debut.
Win	8–1	Nathan Wheelock	TKO (punches)	UCF: Battle at the Border 2	October 9, 2004	2	N/A	Medford, Oregon, United States	
Loss	7–1	Mark Castle	Decision (split)	FCFF: Rumble at the Roseland 8	June 7, 2003	2	5:00	Oregon, United States	
Win	7–0	Rex Payne	KO (punch)	FCFF: Rumble at the Roseland 7	April 19, 2003	1	N/A	Portland, Oregon, United States	
Win	6–0	Eddy Ellis	Submission (armbar)	Ultimate Ring Challenge 3	January 4, 2003	1	1:23	Kelso, Washington, United States	
Win	5–0	Mike Jonet	KO (punch)	FCFF: Rumble at the Roseland 5	December 14, 2002	2	0:24	Oregon, United States	
Win	4–0	Olaf Alfonso	TKO (corner stoppage)	Desert Brawl 5	August 17, 2002	1	N/A	Bend, Oregon, United States	
Win	3–0	Austin Lawrence	TKO (punches)	FCFF: Rumble at the Roseland 4	August 10, 2002	2	1:43	Oregon, United States	
Win	2–0	Brad Blackburn	Decision (split)	FCFF: Rumble at the Roseland 3	May 11, 2002	2	5:00	Oregon, United States	
Win	1–0	Dennis Harada	Submission	FCFF: Rumble at the Roseland 2	March 16, 2002	2	N/A	Oregon, United States	
