= Tom Watson (fighter) =

English mixed martial arts fighter

- Born: 13 July 1982 (age 44); Southampton, England
- Other names: Kong
- Height: 6 ft 1 in (1.85 m)
- Weight: 186 lb (84 kg; 13.3 st)
- Division: Middleweight
- Reach: 73.0 in (185 cm)
- Team: Jaco Hybrid Training Center (Blackzilians)
- Years active: 2006-2015

Mixed martial arts record
- Total: 26
- Wins: 17
- By knockout: 8
- By submission: 1
- By decision: 8
- Losses: 9
- By submission: 2
- By decision: 7

Other information
- Mixed martial arts record from Sherdog

Tom Watson (born 13 July 1982) is an English mixed martial artist currently competing in the welterweight division of Cage Warriors. A professional competitor since 2006, he is the former BAMMA Middleweight Champion, the former UCMMA Middleweight Champion, and has also competed for the UFC, Cage Rage and the MFC.

== Background ==
Watson began training when he was 16 years old and has an extensive boxing background, winning two awards, Amateur Boxing Standout 2006, a three-time ABA Southern Counties Champion, and Full Contact Unlicensed Boxing Champion. Watson's nickname comes from his famous ring walks, featuring Watson wearing a gorilla mask.

Watson has also competed in catch wrestling at the Snake Pit World Championships.

== Mixed martial arts career ==
=== Cage Rage and early career ===
Watson held a 1-0-1 amateur record before turning professional in 2006. He won his first two fights and was then given the chance to fight in the UK's top MMA promotion, Cage Rage. His first fight was against Daijiro Matsui in February 2007 at Cage Rage 20, and he lost via an armbar in the first round. He returned to the cage a month later and impressively defeated Dorlan O'Malley via KO after a slam.

After this, he was given another chance against a higher profile opponent. He took on UFC veteran Xavier Foupa-Pokam at CageRage 21: Judgement Day in April, 2007, but was submitted again. He fought a further two times that year, and recorded a win and a loss. In 2008, he began to climb the ladder again by beating Pierre Guillet and John Phillips, but Cage Rage went into liquidation and he then went to Ultimate Challenge MMA.

=== Ultimate Challenge MMA ===
Watson's first Ultimate Challenge MMA bout came against Daniel Cubitt at Ultimate Challenge UK: Bad Breed in December 2008. He won the fight by knocking his opponent out less than two minutes into the first round to win the inaugural Ultimate Challenge UK title. He returned to Ultimate Challenge UK: Dynamite in October 2009 to take on Denniston Sutherland, and defeated him via split decision.

=== Maximum Fighting Championship ===
On 10 January 2010, Watson signed a three-fight deal with the Maximum Fighting Championship, a Canadian promotion. His first fight was on 26 February 2010, where he took on Travis Galbraith on MFC 24: Heat XC. In the second minute of the first round, Kong knocked his opponent out with a vicious right head kick. This won him knockout of the night and put him at the top of the list for knockout of the year.

His second fight for the Canadian promotion took place on the main card of MFC 26 card against Jesse Taylor. Watson lost via unanimous decision (30-26, 30–26, 30-26) after being deducted a point for repeatedly grabbing the ropes.

=== BAMMA ===
On 27 June 2009, Watson fought at the British Association of Mixed Martial Arts' first event, BAMMA 1: The Fighting Premiership. After a hard-fought battle, Watson defeated John Maguire via TKO at 2:47 in round 3. It was confirmed that Maguire had broken his arm during the fight after a takedown.

He was then scheduled to fight Celebrity Big Brother winner Alex Reid for the vacant Middleweight Championship at BAMMA 3 in May 2010. However, Reid injured his knee while filming his documentary TV series Alex Reid: The Fight of His Life and was forced to pull out of the fight. This angered Watson, who claimed Reid was disrespecting him. Watson also called him a "clown" and said that it was likely Reid pulled out to avoid an embarrassing defeat. Reid was then replaced by UFC and IFL veteran Matt Horwich. After miraculously freeing himself from a rear-naked choke in the first round, Watson went on to dominate the fight with his superior striking and won via unanimous decision (48-47, 49–47, 49-46) to become the first BAMMA Middleweight Champion.

Initially, Watson maintained that he did not want to waste any more time training for and fighting such a low-level opponent as Reid but the Reid vs. Watson fight was rescheduled for BAMMA 4 on 25 September 2010. Watson won by unanimous decision, as the judges scored the fight 49-46 49-46 49–47.

On 21 May 2011, he faced former EliteXC Middleweight Champion Murilo Rua at Wembley Arena in London, England, defeating the PRIDE FC veteran by KO due to head kick followed up by punches in the third round, and defending his BAMMA Middleweight Title in the process.

Watson was set to fight former UFC Welterweight contender and current BAMMA Middleweight, Frank Trigg, for Kong's BAMMA Middleweight Championship. However, Tom suffered a back injury and was replaced by Jim Wallhead.

Watson defended his title at BAMMA 9 against BAMMA British Middleweight Champion Jack Marshman, winning via TKO in the second round.

=== Ultimate Fighting Championship ===
After successfully defending his BAMMA Middleweight Championship title three times, Watson signed a contract with the UFC in July 2012.

In his debut, Watson fought Brad Tavares on 29 September 2012 at UFC on Fuel TV 5. He lost the fight via split decision.

Watson next faced undefeated Stanislav Nedkov on 16 February 2013 at UFC on Fuel TV: Barão vs. McDonald. He won the back-and-forth fight via TKO in the second round. Both participants earned Fight of the Night honors for their performance, while Watson also earned a Knockout of the Night bonus.

For his third fight with the promotion, Watson faced Thales Leites on 3 August 2013 at UFC 163. He lost the fight via unanimous decision.

Watson was expected to face Alessio Sakara on 26 October 2013 at UFC Fight Night: Machida vs. Munoz. However, he was forced out of the bout with an injury and was replaced by Magnus Cedenblad.

Watson fought Nick Catone on 1 February 2014 at UFC 169. He lost the fight via split decision.

Watson faced promotional newcomer Sam Alvey on 16 August 2014 at UFC Fight Night 47. He won the back-and-forth fight via unanimous decision.

Watson faced Rafael Natal on 31 January 2015 at UFC 183. He lost the fight by unanimous decision.

Watson faced Chris Camozzi on 8 August 2015 at UFC Fight Night 73. He lost the fight by unanimous decision and was subsequently released from the promotion.

=== Return to BAMMA ===
On 25 July 2018 it was announced that after a three-year hiatus from fighting, Watson had signed a multi-fight contract with BAMMA. Due to complete lack of events in BAMMA, Watson was announced to have signed with Cage Warriors and will be moving down to welterweight division. Watson was expected to face Aaron Khalid at Cage Warriors 104, but on the fight day he was not medically cleared and was forced off the card.

== Championships and accomplishments ==
- BAMMA
  - BAMMA World Middleweight Championship (One time)
    - Three successful title defenses
  - Fight of the Night (Five times)
  - Knockout of the Night (Three times)
- Ultimate Fighting Championship
  - Fight of the Night (One time)
  - Knockout of the Night (One time)
- Maximum Fighting Championship
  - Knockout of the Night (One time)
  - Knockout of the Year 2010
- Ultimate Challenge MMA
  - UCMMA World Middleweight Championship (One time)
    - One successful title defense

== Mixed martial arts record ==
Professional record breakdown
26 matches	17 wins	9 losses
By knockout	8	0
By submission	1	2
By decision	8	7

Res.	Record	Opponent	Method	Event	Date	Round	Time	Location	Notes
Loss	17–9	Chris Camozzi	Decision (unanimous)	UFC Fight Night: Teixeira vs. Saint Preux	8 August 2015	3	5:00	Nashville, Tennessee, United States	Watson was deducted one point in the second round due to repeated illegal groin strikes.
Loss	17–8	Rafael Natal	Decision (unanimous)	UFC 183	31 January 2015	3	5:00	Las Vegas, Nevada, United States	
Win	17–7	Sam Alvey	Decision (unanimous)	UFC Fight Night: Bader vs. St. Preux	16 August 2014	3	5:00	Bangor, Maine, United States	
Loss	16–7	Nick Catone	Decision (split)	UFC 169	1 February 2014	3	5:00	Newark, New Jersey, United States	
Loss	16–6	Thales Leites	Decision (unanimous)	UFC 163	3 August 2013	3	5:00	Rio de Janeiro, Brazil	
Win	16–5	Stanislav Nedkov	TKO (knees and punches)	UFC on Fuel TV: Barão vs. McDonald	16 February 2013	2	4:42	London, England	Knockout of the Night. Fight of the Night.
Loss	15–5	Brad Tavares	Decision (split)	UFC on Fuel TV: Struve vs. Miocic	29 September 2012	3	5:00	Nottingham, England	
Win	15–4	Jack Marshman	TKO (punches and elbows)	BAMMA 9	24 March 2012	2	4:50	Birmingham, England	Defended the BAMMA World Middleweight Championship. Won the BAMMA British Middleweight Championship.
Win	14–4	Murilo Rua	KO (head kick and punches)	BAMMA 6: Watson vs. Rua	21 May 2011	3	2:06	London, England	Defended the BAMMA World Middleweight Championship.
Win	13–4	Alex Reid	Decision (unanimous)	BAMMA 4	25 September 2010	5	5:00	Birmingham, England	Defended the BAMMA World Middleweight Championship. Fight of the Night.
Loss	12–4	Jesse Taylor	Decision (unanimous)	MFC 26	10 September 2010	3	5:00	Brandon, Manitoba, Canada	
Win	12–3	Matt Horwich	Decision (unanimous)	BAMMA 3	15 May 2010	5	5:00	Birmingham, England	Won the inaugural BAMMA World Middleweight Championship. Fight of the Night.
Win	11–3	Travis Galbraith	KO (head kick)	MFC 24	26 February 2010	1	1:56	Edmonton, Alberta, Canada	Knockout of the Night.
Win	10–3	Denniston Sutherland	Decision (split)	UCMMA 8: Dynamite	24 October 2009	3	5:00	London, England	Defended the UCMMA Middleweight Championship.
Win	9–3	John Maguire	TKO (punches)	BAMMA 1	27 June 2009	2	3:47	London, England	Knockout of the Night. Fight of the Night.
Win	8–3	Daniel Cubitt	TKO (punches)	UCMMA 1: Bad Breed	6 December 2008	1	1:57	London, England	Won the UCMMA Middleweight Championship.
Win	7–3	Lloyd Clarkson	Decision (unanimous)	Atlas Fighting Challenge	9 August 2008	3	5:00	Coventry, England	
Win	6–3	John Phillips	Decision (unanimous)	Cage Rage 27	12 July 2008	3	5:00	London, England	
Win	5–3	Pierre Guillet	KO (upkick)	Cage Rage 25	8 March 2008	1	1:05	London, England	
Loss	4–3	Mark Epstein	Decision (split)	Cage Rage 24	1 December 2007	3	5:00	London, England	
Win	4–2	Ed Smith	Decision (unanimous)	Cage Rage 22	14 July 2007	3	5:00	London, England	
Loss	3–2	Xavier Foupa-Pokam	Submission (triangle kimura)	Cage Rage 21	21 April 2007	2	2:27	London, England	
Win	3–1	Dorlan O'Malley	KO (slam and punches)	Cage Rage Contenders 4	3 March 2007	1	2:21	London, England	
Loss	2–1	Daijiro Matsui	Submission (armbar)	Cage Rage 20	10 February 2007	1	0:59	London, England	
Win	2–0	Tulio Palhares	Decision	ZT Fight Night 2	25 June 2006	3	5:00	London, England	
Win	1–0	Michael Watson	Submission (guillotine choke)	ZT Fight Night 1	19 February 2006	1	1:11	London, England	

== See also ==
- List of current UFC fighters
- List of male mixed martial artists
