= Thales Leites =

Brazilian mixed martial arts fighter

- Born: Thales Leites Lourenço; 6 September 1981 (age 45); Niterói, Rio de Janeiro, Brazil
- Height: 6 ft 1 in (1.85 m)
- Weight: 185 lb (84 kg; 13.2 st)
- Division: Middleweight
- Reach: 78 in (198 cm)
- Style: Brazilian Jiu-Jitsu, Muay Thai
- Team: Nova União
- Rank: 3rd degree black belt in Brazilian Jiu-Jitsu under Welton Ribeiro
- Years active: 2003–2018 (MMA)

Mixed martial arts record
- Total: 37
- Wins: 28
- By knockout: 4
- By submission: 15
- By decision: 9
- Losses: 9
- By knockout: 1
- By submission: 1
- By decision: 7

Other information
- Mixed martial arts record from Sherdog

Thales Leites Lourenço (Portuguese pronunciation: [ˈtaliʒ ˈlejtʃiʃ]; born 6 September 1981) is a retired Brazilian mixed martial artist best known for competing in the middleweight division of the Ultimate Fighting Championship.

== Mixed martial arts career ==
=== Early career ===
Leites made his mixed martial arts debut at Shooto Brazil in 2003, defeating Felipe Arinelli by arm-triangle choke submission. Leites would win his next two fights in Vitória before making his debut in the United States in Hawaii's Rumble on the Rock promotion in 2005, where he defeated Adam Roland in his fourth consecutive mixed martial arts victory.

After a successful outing in the U.S., Leites returned to Brazil to fight Gustavo Machado, who was coming off two wins in the Japanese Pancrase organization. Leites defeated the more experienced Machado by submission in the third round, and was invited back to Rumble on the Rock to fight Hawaiian Ronald Jhun in September. Despite fighting a hometown favorite, Leites notched his sixth victory, defeating Jhun by technical knockout in the later half of the fight.

Although Leites held an unblemished record, he did not gain much mainstream exposure until his bouts with Osami Shibuya in Japan's MARS promotion, and Jose Landi-Jons in Brazil's Jungle Fight promotion. In both fights, Leites was much less experienced than his opponents; about Landi-Jons, Leites admitted, "He was already famous when I was not even interested" in mixed martial arts. Despite the experience disparity, Leites defeated both opponents, scoring a unanimous decision over Shibuya, and submitting Landi-Jons with an arm-triangle choke, increasing Leites' professional record to 9–0.

=== Ultimate Fighting Championship ===
In September 2006, it was announced that Leites would make his UFC debut against veteran middleweight Nate Marquardt at Ortiz vs. Shamrock 3: The Final Chapter. However, due to issues with his travel documentation, Leites was not able to compete at the event as planned.

Leites made his debut at The Ultimate Fighter 4 Finale, where he lost a unanimous decision to Danish kickboxer Martin Kampmann.

In his next fight, at UFC 69, he defeated The Ultimate Fighter 4 contestant Pete Sell. Leites next earned a submission victory over Floyd Sword at The Ultimate Fighter 5 Finale by arm-triangle choke. He was then scheduled to fight Ryan Jensen at UFC 74. Leites accepted the fight after Travis Lutter, Jensen's original opponent, was forced to withdraw from the event. Leites defeated Jensen by armbar submission in the first round, raising his UFC record to 3 wins, 1 loss.

Leites was scheduled to fight Nate Marquardt at UFC 81, but withdrew from the bout after breaking his hand in training. Leites finally fought Marquardt at UFC 85, winning by a controversial split decision due to point deductions in the 2nd and 3rd rounds to Marquardt.

On the undercard of UFC 90 Leites was able to earn a submission victory over heavy-handed Drew McFedries. This win would prove to be valuable as Leites was able to earn number one contendership to the UFC middleweight title against current champion Anderson Silva on UFC 97 in Montreal. Leites was defeated by Silva via unanimous decision in what many consider to be the worst fight in UFC history. On his return to the octagon, Leites was defeated again via a controversial split decision against Italian Alessio Sakara. The fight caused a lot of booing which started during the first round and continued throughout the fight. The lack of action during the fight at one point caused referee Marc Goddard to state to the fighters that Mixed Martial Arts was a "contact sport".

Following the loss, Leites, along with George Roop and Tamdan McCrory, were cut from the UFC. Just days later, Dana White revealed to Yahoo Sports his unawareness of McCrory and Leites' release from the UFC and expressed his intentions to reverse those actions. Shortly after, White decided not to reverse the decisions.

=== Post-UFC ===
Leites earned a decision victory over Dean Lister at MFC 23 on 4 December 2009, a submission victory over Rico Washington at Bitetti Combat MMA 6 on 25 February 2010, and a submission victory over Jesse Taylor at MFC 25 on 7 May 2010.

He was scheduled to face Falaniko Vitale on 14 August 2010, in California, but instead faced Matt Horwich at the event and suffered the first submission loss of his career.

In the Superior Challenge promotion, Leites submitted top European Middleweight Tor Troéng at Superior Challenge 6 on 29 October 2010, and fought Jeremy Horn to a split decision victory at Superior Challenge 7 on 30 April 2011.

=== Return to the UFC ===
After winning three fights in a row, Leites was re-signed by the UFC and made his return against Tom Watson on 3 August 2013 at UFC 163. He won the fight via dominant unanimous decision.

Leites next faced Ed Herman on 16 November 2013 at UFC 167. He won the fight via unanimous decision.

Leites faced Trevor Smith on 11 April 2014 at UFC Fight Night 39. He won the fight via TKO in the first round.

Leites faced Francis Carmont on 23 August 2014 at UFC Fight Night 49. He won the fight via second-round knockout. The win also earned Leites his first Performance of the Night bonus award.

Leites then faced Tim Boetsch on 31 January 2015 at UFC 183. He won the fight via technical submission due to an arm-triangle choke in the second round. Both fighters were awarded Fight of the Night bonuses for their performance, and Leites was awarded an additional Performance of the Night bonus, making it his second overall for the latter.

Leites faced Michael Bisping on 18 July 2015 at UFC Fight Night 72. He lost the fight via split decision.

Leites faced Gegard Mousasi on 27 February 2016 at UFC Fight Night 84. He lost the fight via unanimous decision.

Leites next faced Chris Camozzi on 6 August 2016 at UFC Fight Night 92. He won the fight by submission due to a rear-naked choke in the third round.

Leites faced Krzysztof Jotko on 19 November 2016 at UFC Fight Night 100. He lost the fight via unanimous decision.

Leites faced Sam Alvey on 22 April 2017 at UFC Fight Night 108. He won the fight via unanimous decision.

Leites faced Brad Tavares on 7 October 2017 at UFC 216. He lost the fight by unanimous decision.

Leites faced Jack Hermansson on 12 May 2018 at UFC 224. He lost the fight via TKO in the third round, marking the first time he's been finished by TKO in his professional MMA career.

Leites faced Héctor Lombard on 22 September 2018 at UFC Fight Night 137. He won the fight via unanimous decision and Leites announced his retirement after the fight.

== Personal life ==
Leites and his girlfriend had a daughter named Valentina in July 2009.

== Championships and accomplishments ==
- Ultimate Fighting Championship
  - Performance of the Night (Two times) vs. Francis Carmont and Tim Boetsch
  - Submission of the Night (One time) vs. Ryan Jensen
  - Fight of the Night (One time) vs. Tim Boetsch
  - Most submission attempts in UFC Middleweight division history (20)
  - Tied (Demian Maia, Rousimar Palhares & Antônio Carlos Júnior) for second most submission wins in UFC Middleweight division history (5)
  - Tied (Anderson Silva & Derek Brunson) for fifth most bouts in UFC Middleweight division history (21)
  - Fifth most total fight time in UFC Middleweight division history (4:23:53)
  - Second most takedowns landed in UFC Middleweight division history (37)
  - UFC.com Awards
    - 2015: Ranked #4 Submission of the Year vs. Tim Boetsch
- Superior Challenge
  - SC Middleweight Championship (One time)
- MMAJunkie.com
  - 2015 January Submission of the Month vs. Tim Boetsch

== Mixed martial arts record ==
Professional record breakdown
37 matches	28 wins	9 losses
By knockout	4	1
By submission	15	1
By decision	9	7

Res.	Record	Opponent	Method	Event	Date	Round	Time	Location	Notes
Win	28–9	Héctor Lombard	Decision (unanimous)	UFC Fight Night: Santos vs. Anders	22 September 2018	3	5:00	São Paulo, Brazil	
Loss	27–9	Jack Hermansson	TKO (punches)	UFC 224	12 May 2018	3	2:10	Rio de Janeiro, Brazil	
Loss	27–8	Brad Tavares	Decision (unanimous)	UFC 216	7 October 2017	3	5:00	Las Vegas, Nevada, United States	
Win	27–7	Sam Alvey	Decision (unanimous)	UFC Fight Night: Swanson vs. Lobov	22 April 2017	3	5:00	Nashville, Tennessee, United States	
Loss	26–7	Krzysztof Jotko	Decision (unanimous)	UFC Fight Night: Bader vs. Nogueira 2	19 November 2016	3	5:00	São Paulo, Brazil	
Win	26–6	Chris Camozzi	Submission (rear-naked choke)	UFC Fight Night: Rodríguez vs. Caceres	6 August 2016	3	2:58	Salt Lake City, Utah, United States	
Loss	25–6	Gegard Mousasi	Decision (unanimous)	UFC Fight Night: Silva vs. Bisping	27 February 2016	3	5:00	London, England	
Loss	25–5	Michael Bisping	Decision (split)	UFC Fight Night: Bisping vs. Leites	18 July 2015	5	5:00	Glasgow, Scotland	
Win	25–4	Tim Boetsch	Technical Submission (arm-triangle choke)	UFC 183	31 January 2015	2	3:45	Las Vegas, Nevada, United States	Performance of the Night. Fight of the Night.
Win	24–4	Francis Carmont	KO (punches)	UFC Fight Night: Henderson vs. dos Anjos	23 August 2014	2	0:20	Tulsa, Oklahoma, United States	Performance of the Night.
Win	23–4	Trevor Smith	TKO (punches)	UFC Fight Night: Nogueira vs. Nelson	11 April 2014	1	0:45	Abu Dhabi, United Arab Emirates	
Win	22–4	Ed Herman	Decision (unanimous)	UFC 167	16 November 2013	3	5:00	Las Vegas, Nevada, United States	
Win	21–4	Tom Watson	Decision (unanimous)	UFC 163	3 August 2013	3	5:00	Rio de Janeiro, Brazil	
Win	20–4	Matt Horwich	Submission (arm-triangle choke)	Amazon Forest Combat 2	31 March 2012	2	4:39	Manaus, Brazil	Catchweight (194 lbs) bout.
Win	19–4	Jeremy Horn	Decision (split)	Superior Challenge 7	30 April 2011	3	5:00	Stockholm, Sweden	Won the Superior Challenge Middleweight Championship.
Win	18–4	Tor Troéng	Submission (rear-naked choke)	Superior Challenge 6	29 October 2010	2	3:33	Stockholm, Sweden	
Loss	17–4	Matt Horwich	Submission (rear-naked choke)	Powerhouse World Promotions: War on the Mainland	14 August 2010	4	0:44	Irvine, California, United States	For the PWP Middleweight Championship.
Win	17–3	Jesse Taylor	Submission (triangle choke)	MFC 25	7 May 2010	1	2:27	Edmonton, Alberta, Canada	
Win	16–3	Rico Washington	Submission (arm-triangle choke)	Bitetti Combat MMA 6	25 February 2010	1	2:40	Brasília, Brazil	
Win	15–3	Dean Lister	Decision (unanimous)	MFC 23	4 December 2009	3	5:00	Edmonton, Alberta, Canada	
Loss	14–3	Alessio Sakara	Decision (split)	UFC 101	8 August 2009	3	5:00	Philadelphia, Pennsylvania, United States	
Loss	14–2	Anderson Silva	Decision (unanimous)	UFC 97	18 April 2009	5	5:00	Montreal, Quebec, Canada	For the UFC Middleweight Championship.
Win	14–1	Drew McFedries	Submission (rear-naked choke)	UFC 90	25 October 2008	1	1:18	Rosemont, Illinois, United States	
Win	13–1	Nate Marquardt	Decision (split)	UFC 85	7 June 2008	3	5:00	London, England	Marquardt was deducted two points during the fight due to illegal strikes.
Win	12–1	Ryan Jensen	Submission (armbar)	UFC 74	25 August 2007	1	3:47	Las Vegas, Nevada, United States	Submission of the Night.
Win	11–1	Floyd Sword	Submission (arm-triangle choke)	The Ultimate Fighter 5 Finale	23 June 2007	1	3:50	Las Vegas, Nevada, United States	
Win	10–1	Pete Sell	Decision (unanimous)	UFC 69	7 April 2007	3	5:00	Houston, Texas, United States	
Loss	9–1	Martin Kampmann	Decision (unanimous)	The Ultimate Fighter 4 Finale	11 November 2006	3	5:00	Las Vegas, Nevada, United States	
Win	9–0	José Landi-Jons	Technical Submission (arm-triangle choke)	Jungle Fight 6	29 April 2006	1	2:40	Manaus, Brazil	
Win	8–0	Osami Shibuya	Decision (unanimous)	MARS	4 February 2006	3	5:00	Tokyo, Japan	
Win	7–0	Jason Guida	Submission (armbar)	Ultimate Warriors Combat 1	10 December 2005	1	1:38	Honolulu, Hawaii, United States	
Win	6–0	Ronald Jhun	TKO (doctor stoppage)	ROTR: Qualifiers	17 September 2005	3	0:32	Honolulu, Hawaii, United States	
Win	5–0	Gustavo Machado	Submission (arm-triangle choke)	Storm Samurai 8	2 July 2005	3	N/A	Brasília, Brazil	
Win	4–0	Adam Roland	Submission (armbar)	Rumble on the Rock 7	7 May 2005	1	0:49	Honolulu, Hawaii, United States	
Win	3–0	Flavio Luiz Moura	Submission (arm-triangle choke)	Vitoria Extreme Fighting 1	29 May 2004	N/A	N/A	Vitória, Brazil	
Win	2–0	Lucio Linhares	TKO (corner stoppage)	Vitoria Extreme Fighting 1	29 May 2004	1	N/A	Vitória, Brazil	
Win	1–0	Felipe Arinelli	Submission (arm-triangle choke)	Shooto Brazil: Welcome to Hell	23 November 2003	2	N/A	Rio de Janeiro, Brazil	

== See also ==
- List of current UFC fighters
- List of male mixed martial artists
