= Solomon Hutcherson =

American mixed martial arts fighter (born 1972)

- Born: Solomon Hutcherson; August 13, 1972 (age 54); Racine, Wisconsin
- Other names: King
- Nationality: American
- Height: 5 ft 11 in (1.80 m)
- Weight: 185 lb (84 kg; 13.2 st)
- Division: Middleweight
- Team: Roufussport
- Years active: 2002–present

Mixed martial arts record
- Total: 19
- Wins: 11
- By knockout: 5
- By submission: 4
- By decision: 2
- Losses: 7
- By knockout: 4
- By submission: 2
- By decision: 1
- No contests: 1

Other information
- Mixed martial arts record from Sherdog

Solomon Hutcherson (born August 13, 1972) is an American professional mixed martial arts fighter formerly competing in the Middleweight division. He was a contestant on The Ultimate Fighter 3, and has competed for the UFC and MFC.

== Background ==
Hutcherson was born and raised Racine, Wisconsin and attended Racine Park High School, where he competed in wrestling and qualified for the state tournament in his sophomore, junior, and senior years. In his senior year, Hutcherson placed sixth in the state and continued his career at Triton College in River Grove, Illinois but dropped out when his daughter was born.

== Mixed martial arts career ==
=== The Ultimate Fighter ===
During The Ultimate Fighter 3 Hutcherson trained under Ken Shamrock's team. He kicked off a good relationship with Kendall Grove, forming "Team Dagger", although they were in different teams.

After losing the fight with Rory Singer he stated

“You always end up learning from a loss. I had never gone into any of my prior fights taking things so personally. I was in the position of living out a dream. I have been watching the UFC ever since I was a kid. I finally had the chance to get inside the Octagon. That really got to me on an emotional level.”

After the TUF show, he trained with Kendall Grove in the Xtreme Couture Camp for two years.

=== Other Competitions ===
At the "Xtreme MMA 5" event, Hutcherson met David Loiseau. During the final round, Solomon was knocked out by repeated knee strikes to the head, in a Muay Thai clinch.

=== Maximum Fighting Championship ===
Hutcherson fought Jason MacDonald at Maximum Fighting Championship event in December 2009, losing by split decision.

Nearly a year later, Hutcherson returned to Maximum Fighting Championship and faced David Heath at MFC 26: Retribution. Hutcherson lost via KO in the second round.

== Mixed martial arts record ==
Professional record breakdown
19 matches	11 wins	7 losses
By knockout	5	4
By submission	4	2
By decision	2	1
No contests	1	

Res.	Record	Opponent	Method	Event	Date	Round	Time	Location	Notes
Loss	11–7 (1)	David Heath	KO (superman punch)	MFC 26: Retribution	September 10, 2010	2	3:46	Enoch, Alberta, Canada	
Loss	11–6 (1)	Jason MacDonald	Decision (split)	MFC 23	December 4, 2009	3	5:00	Edmonton, Alberta, Canada	
Win	11–5 (1)	Dave Mewborn	Decision (unanimous)	MFC 20	February 20, 2009	3	5:00	Enoch, Alberta, Canada	
Loss	10–5 (1)	David Loiseau	TKO (knees)	XMMA 5 - It's Crow Time	September 13, 2008	5	1:56	Montreal, Quebec, Canada	
Win	10–4 (1)	Marcus Hicks	TKO (punches)	TFC 3 - This Means War	May 31, 2008	1	1:29	Edmonton, Alberta, Canada	
Win	9–4 (1)	George Allen	TKO (corner stoppage)	ISCF - Unleashed	March 28, 2008	1	4:55	North Carolina, United States	
Win	8–4 (1)	Nabil Khatib	Submission (injury)	HCF - Hardcore Championship Fighting	July 21, 2007	2	4:34	Enoch, Alberta, Canada	
Win	7–4 (1)	Anthony Trotter	TKO (punches)	MMA BigShow - Domination	June 23, 2007	1	4:18	Cincinnati, Ohio, United States	
Loss	6–4 (1)	Luigi Fioravanti	KO (punch)	The Ultimate Fighter: Team Ortiz vs. Team Shamrock Finale	June 24, 2006	1	4:15	Las Vegas, Nevada, United States	
Win	6–3 (1)	Kyle Olsen	Submission (rear-naked choke)	FCC 18 - Freestyle Combat Challenge 18	March 5, 2005	1	N/A	Racine, Wisconsin, United States	
Win	5–3 (1)	Bobby Garrits	Decision (unanimous)	FCC 16 - Freestyle Combat Challenge 16	September 25, 2004	2	5:00	Racine, Wisconsin, United States	
Win	4–3 (1)	Rob Smith	TKO (knees)	FCC 14 - Freestyle Combat Challenge 14	March 6, 2004	2	3:03	Racine, Wisconsin, United States	
Loss	3–3 (1)	Jorge Rivera	KO (punches)	USMMA 3 - Ring of Fury	May 3, 2003	1	3:01	Boston, Massachusetts, United States	
NC	3–2 (1)	Jon Fitch	No Contest	HOOKnSHOOT - Boot Camp 1.1	March 8, 2003	2	N/A	Evansville, Indiana, United States	Fitch was cut via an illegal kick
Win	3–2	John Nashef	Submission (punches)	FCC 9 - Freestyle Combat Challenge 9	January 11, 2003	1	N/A	Racine, Wisconsin, United States	
Loss	2–2	Emyr Bussade	Submission (rear-naked choke)	HOOKnSHOOT - Absolute Fighting Championships 1	December 13, 2002	1	2:51	Ft. Lauderdale, Florida, United States	
Loss	2–1	Rick Graveson	Submission (rear-naked choke)	FCC 8 - Freestyle Combat Challenge 8	October 4, 2002	N/A	N/A	Racine, Wisconsin, United States	
Win	2–0	Joe Nye	TKO (punches)	USMMA 2 - Ring of Fury	September 21, 2002	1	3:50	Lowell, Massachusetts, United States	
Win	1–0	Jason Allar	Submission (rear-naked choke)	FCC 7 - Freestyle Combat Challenge 7	March 23, 2002	1	3:48	Racine, Wisconsin, United States	
