= Rodney Wallace (fighter) =

American mixed martial arts fighter (born 1981)

- Born: Rodney Wallace; November 21, 1981 (age 44); Bamberg, South Carolina, U.S.
- Other names: Sho Nuff The Master
- Nationality: American
- Height: 5 ft 9 in (1.75 m)
- Weight: 220 lb (100 kg; 16 st)
- Division: Heavyweight; Light Heavyweight; Middleweight
- Reach: 72.0 in (183 cm)
- Fighting out of: Charlotte, North Carolina, U.S. Salisbury, North Carolina, U.S.
- Team: Team ROC; Fight Legion; Chute Boxe Piraju
- Years active: 2008–2017

Mixed martial arts record
- Total: 43
- Wins: 26
- By knockout: 6
- By submission: 3
- By decision: 17
- Losses: 16
- By knockout: 6
- By submission: 1
- By decision: 9
- Draws: 1

Other information
- Mixed martial arts record from Sherdog

Rodney Wallace (born November 21, 1981) is an American mixed martial artist who competed in the Heavyweight division. A professional competitor from 2008 to 2017, he has competed for the UFC, Bellator, the MFC, M-1 Global, KSW, and Absolute Championship Berkut.

== Background ==
Wallace was born in Bamberg, South Carolina, moved to Passaic, New Jersey when he was one year old, then returned to his birthplace at the age of 13 when he began playing football and wrestling.

At Bamberg-Ehrhardt High School in Bamberg, South Carolina, Wallace competed in both sports as well as track and field. He reached the state finals in wrestling when he was a freshman, then won the South Carolina state championship his sophomore, junior, and senior years.

He continued his football career with a scholarship to NCAA Division II Catawba College in Salisbury, North Carolina, where he was an All-Conference running back from 2001 to 2004, and finished his career as the school's all-time leading rusher.

== Mixed martial arts career ==
=== Ultimate Fighting Championship ===
Wallace lost his UFC debut at The Ultimate Fighter 10 Finale by unanimous decision to former WEC Light Heavyweight Champion Brian Stann.

Wallace next fought Jared Hamman on March 27, 2010, at UFC 111. Wallace lost this fight by way of a unanimous decision (29-28, 29-28, 29-28). This fight was very fast-paced and there were several situations in which both men were rocked. The fight was selected as Fight of the Night, earning both fighters $65,000.

Wallace was scheduled to face Stanislav Nedkov on August 7, 2010, at UFC 117. However, Nedkov was forced from the card with an injury and was replaced by Phil Davis. Wallace lost the fight via unanimous decision.

Following the loss to Davis, Wallace was released from the promotion.

=== Independent promotions ===
After his release from the UFC, Wallace went on to face and defeat David Heath at MFC 27 via unanimous decision. He lost his second fight for the promotion against Emanuel Newton at MFC 28 via submission.

Wallace next faced Cale Yarbrough on April 15, 2011, at Scrap Live: Fight Night 7.

Rodney Wallace next fought Derrick Mehmen at WMMA 1: Fighting for a Better World on March 31, 2012. Wallace won this fight via unanimous decision.

Wallace next competed against Polish fighter Mamed Khalidov on May 12, 2012, at KSW XIX. He lost the fight via knockout in the first round.

Rodney Wallace next fought former WEC Middleweight Champion Paulo Filho to a draw at Selva MMA on August 4, 2013, in Brazil.

=== Bellator MMA ===
Wallace made his debut for Bellator MMA on April 11, 2014, at Bellator 116. He faced Carlos Eduardo and won the fight via unanimous decision.

Wallace faced Kelly Anundson on June 6, 2014, at Bellator 121. He lost the fight by unanimous decision.

In August 2014, Wallace was released from Bellator, along with twelve other fighters.

=== Absolute Championship Berkut ===
Wallace faced Shamil Gamzatov on January 13, 2017, at ACB 51. He lost the fight by split decision.

== Bare knuckle boxing career ==
He challenged Croatian Marko Martinjak for his UBBADA world cruiserweight title at BKB 5 event in Coventry on April 22, 2017, losing the fight via first round TKO due to a cut above the eye.

== Championships and accomplishments ==
=== Mixed martial arts ===
- SMASH Fight
  - SMASH Fight Light Heavyweight Championship (One time, current)
- Ultimate Fighting Championship
  - Fight of the Night (One time) vs. Jared Hamman
- Warfare FC
  - WFC Light Heavyweight Championship (One time, current)
- Hard Knocks Fighting
  - HKFC Light Heavyweight Championship (One time, current)

=== Amateur wrestling ===
- South Carolina High School League
  - South Carolina 2A–1A 152 lb State Runner-Up out of Bamberg-Ehrhardt High School (1998)
  - South Carolina 2A–1A 171 lb State Champion out of Bamberg-Ehrhardt High School (1999)
  - South Carolina 2A–1A 189 lb State Champion out of Bamberg-Ehrhardt High School (2000)
  - South Carolina 2A–1A 215 lb State Champion out of Bamberg-Ehrhardt High School (2001)

== Mixed martial arts record ==
Professional record breakdown
43 matches	26 wins	16 losses
By knockout	6	6
By submission	3	1
By decision	17	9
Draws	1	

Res.	Record	Opponent	Method	Event	Date	Round	Time	Location	Notes
Loss	26–16–1	Konstantin Gluhov	KO (spinning back kick to the body)	ProFC 63	September 10, 2017	2	2:58	Rostov-on-Don, Russia	
Loss	26–15–1	Juan Espino	Decision (unanimous)	Combate Comas MMA 3	June 10, 2017	3	5:00	Santa Cruz, Bolivia	
Loss	26–14–1	Ivan Shtyrkov	Decision (unanimous)	RCC Boxing Promotions	February 18, 2017	3	5:00	Chelyabinsk, Russia	Return to Heavyweight.
Loss	26–13–1	Shamil Gamzatov	Decision (split)	ACB 51: Silva vs. Torgeson	January 13, 2017	3	5:00	Irvine, California, United States	
Win	26–12–1	Julio Gallegos	Decision (unanimous)	Conflict MMA 42	November 12, 2016	3	5:00	Indian Trail, North Carolina, United States	
Loss	25–12–1	Isa Umarov	Decision (unanimous)	ACB 38: Breakthrough	May 20, 2016	3	5:00	Rostov-on-Don, Russia	
Loss	25–11–1	Saparbek Safarov	TKO (retirement)	Akhmat Fight Show 18: Grand Prix 2016	April 9, 2016	2	5:00	Grozny, Russia	
Win	25–10–1	Daniel Spohn	Decision (unanimous)	HKFC: Hard Knocks 48	January 29, 2016	5	5:00	Calgary, Alberta, Canada	Defended the HKFC Light Heavyweight Championship.
Win	24–10–1	Adrian Miles	Submission (rear-naked choke)	HKFC: Hard Knocks 47	November 13, 2015	5	2:36	Calgary, Alberta, Canada	Won the vacant HKFC Light Heavyweight Championship.
Win	23–10–1	Kalib Starnes	Decision (unanimous)	HKFC: Hard Knocks 44	June 26, 2015	3	5:00	Calgary, Alberta, Canada	
Loss	22–10–1	Misha Cirkunov	TKO (head kick)	HKFC: Hard Knocks 41	January 30, 2015	1	2:00	Calgary, Alberta, Canada	Lost HKFC Light Heavyweight Championship.
Win	22–9–1	Clay Davidson	Decision (unanimous)	HKFC: Hard Knocks 40	December 12, 2014	3	5:00	Calgary, Alberta, Canada	Won the HKFC Light Heavyweight Championship.
Loss	21–9–1	Kelly Anundson	Decision (unanimous)	Bellator 121	June 6, 2014	3	5:00	Thackerville, Oklahoma, United States	Light Heavyweight Tournament Quarterfinal.
Win	21–8–1	Ariel Gandulla	Decision (unanimous)	HKFC: Hard Knocks 36	May 10, 2014	3	5:00	Fort St. John, British Columbia, Canada	
Win	20–8–1	Carlos Eduardo	Decision (unanimous)	Bellator 116	April 11, 2014	3	5:00	Temecula, California, United States	
Loss	19–8–1	Maxim Grishin	Decision (split)	Driven MMA: One	March 1, 2014	3	5:00	Canton, Ohio, United States	
Loss	19–7–1	Luiz Cane	KO (flying knee)	SFT 1	September 20, 2013	1	3:56	São Paulo, Brazil	
Draw	19–6–1	Paulo Filho	Draw (time limit)	Selva MMA 2	August 4, 2013	5	5:00	Rio Branco, Brazil	
Win	19–6	Matheus Wendell Santi Scheffel	TKO (punches)	SMASH Fight 2	July 13, 2013	2	2:56	Curitiba, Paraná, Brazil	Won the SMASH Fight Light Heavyweight Championship.
Win	18–6	Aaron Johnson	KO (punches)	Warfare FC 9: Apocalypse	June 21, 2013	1	2:00	North Myrtle Beach, South Carolina, United States	Won the Warfare FC Light Heavyweight Championship.
Win	17–6	Salomão Ribeiro	Decision (unanimous)	Jungle Fight 53	June 1, 2013	3	5:00	Japeri, Rio de Janeiro, Brazil	
Win	16–6	Joaquim Ferreira	TKO (punches)	SMASH Fight 1	May 3, 2013	3	1:22	Curitiba, Paraná, Brazil	
Win	15–6	Guilherme Viana	Decision (split)	Iron Fight Combat 2	December 7, 2012	3	5:00	Aracaju, Sergipe, Brazil	Return to Light Heavyweight.
Loss	14–6	Michał Materla	KO (punches)	KSW 21: Final Resolution	December 1, 2012	1	0:22	Warsaw, Poland	Middleweight debut; for the KSW Middleweight Championship.
Win	14–5	Cristiano Lazzarini	TKO (punches)	Brasil Fight 6: Brasil x EUA	September 21, 2012	2	4:28	Belo Horizonte, Minas Gerais, Brazil	
Win	13–5	Aaron Johnson	KO (punch)	RFN: Renaissance Fight Night	July 28, 2012	4	4:00	Montgomery, Alabama, United States	Originally for the RFN Light Heavyweight Championship; Wallace missed weight.
Loss	12–5	Mamed Khalidov	KO (punch)	KSW 19	May 12, 2012	1	1:55	Łódź, Poland	Catchweight (187 lb) bout.
Win	12–4	Derrick Mehmen	Decision (unanimous)	WMMA 1: Fighting for a Better World	March 31, 2012	3	5:00	El Paso, Texas, United States	
Win	11–4	Cale Yarbrough	Decision (unanimous)	Scrap Live: Fight Night 7	April 15, 2011	3	5:00	Winston-Salem, North Carolina, United States	
Loss	10–4	Emanuel Newton	Submission (rear-naked choke)	MFC 28: Supremacy	February 25, 2011	2	4:34	Enoch, Alberta, Canada	
Win	10–3	David Heath	Decision (unanimous)	MFC 27	November 12, 2010	3	5:00	Enoch, Alberta, Canada	
Loss	9–3	Phil Davis	Decision (unanimous)	UFC 117	August 7, 2010	3	5:00	Oakland, California, United States	
Loss	9–2	Jared Hamman	Decision (unanimous)	UFC 111	March 27, 2010	3	5:00	Newark, New Jersey, United States	Fight of the Night.
Loss	9–1	Brian Stann	Decision (unanimous)	The Ultimate Fighter: Heavyweights Finale	December 5, 2009	3	5:00	Las Vegas, Nevada, United States	
Win	9–0	Gregory Milliard	Decision (unanimous)	VFC: A Night Of Vengeance	September 5, 2009	3	5:00	Oranjestad, Aruba	
Win	8–0	Aaron Stark	Submission (kimura)	VFC: A Night Of Vengeance	September 5, 2009	2	2:18	Oranjestad, Aruba	
Win	7–0	Antwain Britt	Submission (armbar)	VFC: A Night Of Vengeance	September 5, 2009	1	3:59	Oranjestad, Aruba	
Win	6–0	Marcus Vanttinen	Decision (unanimous)	M-1 Challenge 16: USA	June 5, 2009	2	5:00	Kansas City, Kansas, United States	Light Heavyweight debut.
Win	5–0	Michael Brown	Decision (unanimous)	RFC: Revolution Fight Club 3	February 20, 2009	3	5:00	Miami, Florida, United States	
Win	4–0	Carlos Zevallos	TKO (punches)	RFC: Revolution Fight Club 2	December 19, 2008	1	0:08	Miami, Florida, United States	
Win	3–0	Ovince St. Preux	Decision (unanimous)	VFC 1: Vengeance Fighting Championship 1	September 27, 2008	3	5:00	Concord, North Carolina, United States	
Win	2–0	Toni Valtonen	Decision (unanimous)	M-1 Challenge 3: Gran Canaria	May 31, 2008	2	5:00	San Agustin, Grand Canaria, Spain	
Win	1–0	Wesley Cantillo	Decision (unanimous)	RFC 1: Revolution Fight Club 1	April 18, 2008	3	5:00	Ft. Lauderdale, Florida, United States	
