= Kajan Johnson =

Canadian mixed martial arts fighter

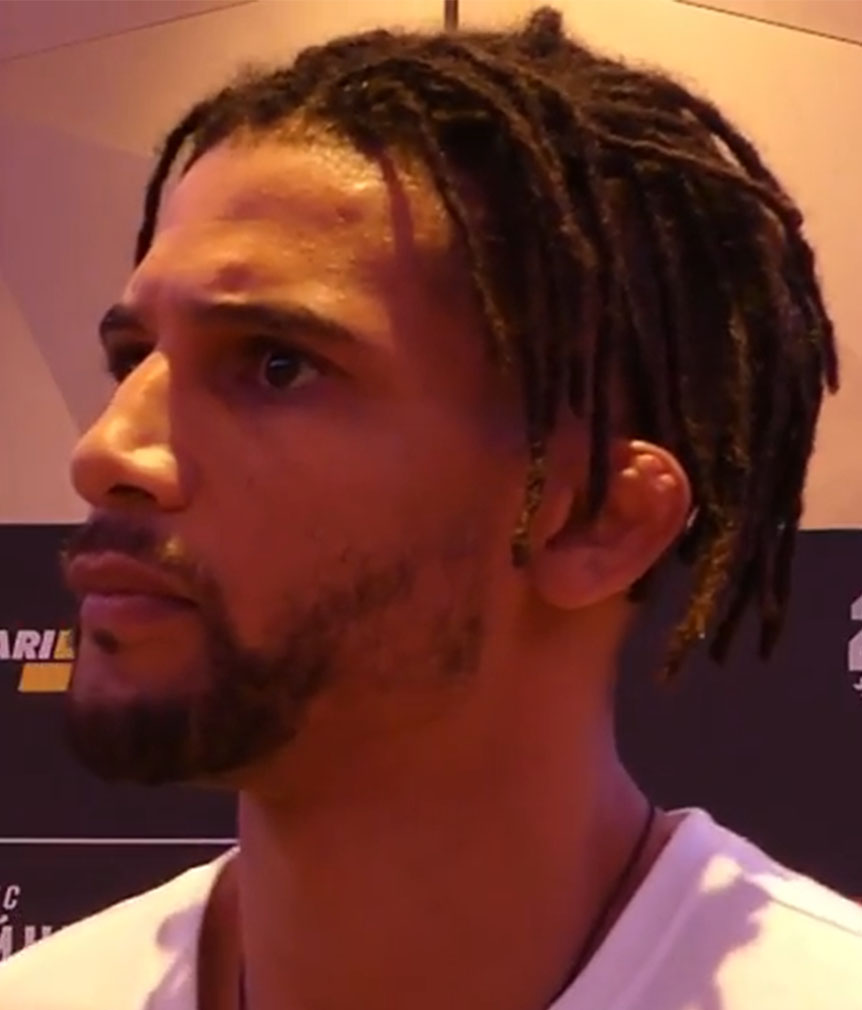
- Kajan Johnson at UFC Fight Night 136 in Moscow
- Born: April 21, 1984 (age 42); Burns Lake, British Columbia, Canada
- Other names: Ragin
- Height: 5 ft 11 in (1.80 m)
- Weight: 155 lb (70 kg; 11 st 1 lb)
- Division: Lightweight
- Reach: 74 in (188 cm)
- Fighting out of: Montreal, Quebec, Canada
- Team: Tristar Gym (2011–present)
- Rank: Black belt in Brazilian Jiu-Jitsu
- Years active: 2002–2018

Mixed martial arts record
- Total: 37
- Wins: 23
- By knockout: 8
- By submission: 8
- By decision: 7
- Losses: 13
- By knockout: 6
- By submission: 2
- By decision: 5
- Draws: 1

Other information
- Mixed martial arts record from Sherdog

Kajan Johnson (born April 21, 1984) is a Canadian retired mixed martial artist who most recently competed in the lightweight division of the UFC. A professional competitor since 2002, he is also known for competing The Ultimate Fighter Nations: Canada vs. Australia for Team Canada, as well as the MFC and King of the Cage.

== Mixed martial arts career ==
=== Early career ===
Johnson made his MMA debut in 2002, going 4–4 by years end. Johnson then made his MFC debut losing to Chad Hanseh.

Starting in October 2005, Johnson went 11–1–1 over five years with his only loss coming in a title fight for the KOTC Canadian Lightweight Championship against future UFC top contender and training partner Rory MacDonald. He also captured the XMMA Lightweight title.

Johnson would make his return to MFC at MFC 23 taking on Ryan Machan. He lost via submission in the first round.

Johnson was set to take on Orestes Betran at MFC 27. Betran then pulled out of the match and was replaced with a veteran of 29 fights at the time, Ryan Healy. He won via unanimous decision.

=== The Ultimate Fighter ===
In late 2013 it was announced that Johnson will be one of the Canadian fighters picked to be on TUF Nations Team Canada.

In episode 1, Johnson is picked to fight first against Australia's own Brendan O’Reilly. Johnson states that he is injured, but that he always fights injured. Despite the injuries, Johnson implies he is still more dangerous than anybody else in the house. Johnson gives Canada their first win with a rear-naked choked in the first round.

In episode 10, Johnson was set to face his teammate Chad Laprise in the semi-finals. Johnson lost via KO in the second round. Johnson's jaw was broken from the punch.

After the show Johnson was noted as the reason for the removal of fellow TUF Nations contestant Tyler Manawaroa from the UFC after claiming Tyler was a racist due to an image posted on his personal Instagram. Tyler was of native New Zealand Maori descent and later explained it was the actions of a schoolboy making fun of himself and his own heritage, as in Australia many Aboriginals, Maoris and Polynesians consider themselves 'dark-skinned' or 'non-white'. Kajan later apologised though nevertheless Tyler was removed from the UFC roster and remains inactive yet undefeated .

=== Ultimate Fighting Championship ===
Johnson made his promotional debut at UFC 174, taking on Tae Hyun Bang. He lost via knockout in the third round. They both earned Fight of the Night honors.

Johnson was then set to face Zhang Lipeng on May 16, 2015, at UFC Fight Night 66. He won via unanimous decision.

Johnson faced Naoyuki Kotani on September 27, 2015, at UFC Fight Night 75. He won the fight by unanimous decision.

Returning from a near two-year hiatus, Johnson faced Adriano Martins at UFC 215 on September 9, 2017. He won the fight via knockout in the third round.

Johnson was scheduled to face Rustam Khabilov on March 17, 2018, at UFC Fight Night 127. However, Khabilov pulled out of the fight citing injury and was replaced by Stevie Ray. He won the fight via split decision.

Johnson faced Islam Makhachev on July 28, 2018, at UFC on Fox 30. He lost the fight via armbar submission in the first round.

The fight with Rustam Khabilov was rescheduled and eventually took place on September 15, 2018, at UFC Fight Night 136. Johnson lost the back-and-forth fight by split decision. 12 out of 13 media scores gave it to Johnson.

On September 29, 2018, Johnson revealed that the fight with Khabilov was the last of his contract and the UFC had not made any attempts to re-sign him.

He announced his retirement from mixed martial arts in 2020 after his release from the UFC.

== Championships and achievements ==
- Ultimate Fighting Championship
  - Fight of the Night (One time)
- Xtreme MMA
  - XMMA Lightweight Title (One time)
- MMAJunkie.com
  - 2018 Robbery of the Year vs. Rustam Khabilov

== Mixed martial arts record ==
Professional record breakdown
37 matches	23 wins	13 losses
By knockout	8	6
By submission	8	2
By decision	7	5
Draws	1	

Res.	Record	Opponent	Method	Event	Date	Round	Time	Location	Notes
Loss	23–13–1	Rustam Khabilov	Decision (split)	UFC Fight Night: Hunt vs. Oleinik	September 15, 2018	3	5:00	Moscow, Russia	
Loss	23–12–1	Islam Makhachev	Submission (armbar)	UFC on Fox: Alvarez vs. Poirier 2	July 28, 2018	1	4:43	Calgary, Alberta, Canada	
Win	23–11–1	Stevie Ray	Decision (split)	UFC Fight Night: Werdum vs. Volkov	March 17, 2018	3	5:00	London, England	
Win	22–11–1	Adriano Martins	KO (punch)	UFC 215	September 9, 2017	3	0:49	Edmonton, Alberta, Canada	
Win	21–11–1	Naoyuki Kotani	Decision (unanimous)	UFC Fight Night: Barnett vs. Nelson	September 27, 2015	3	5:00	Saitama, Japan	
Win	20–11–1	Zhang Lipeng	Decision (unanimous)	UFC Fight Night: Edgar vs. Faber	May 16, 2015	3	5:00	Pasay, Philippines	
Loss	19–11–1	Tae Hyun Bang	KO (punch)	UFC 174	June 14, 2014	3	2:01	Vancouver, British Columbia, Canada	Fight of the Night.
Win	19–10–1	Richie Whitson	Submission (rear-naked choke)	MFC 31: Rundown	October 7, 2011	1	3:52	Edmonton, Alberta, Canada	
Win	18–10–1	Ryan Healy	Decision (unanimous)	MFC 27: Breaking Point	November 12, 2010	3	5:00	Enoch, Alberta, Canada	Catchweight (158 lbs) bout; Healy missed weight.
Loss	17–10–1	Ryan Machan	Submission (rear-naked choke)	MFC 23: Unstoppable	December 4, 2009	1	3:30	Enoch, Alberta, Canada	
Win	17–9–1	Josh Russell	TKO (doctor stoppage)	Heat XC 4: Hysteria	November 6, 2009	2	5:00	Enoch, Alberta, Canada	
Win	16–9–1	Steve Claveau	Submission (armbar)	XMMA 7: Inferno	February 27, 2009	2	3:02	Montreal, Quebec, Canada	Defended the XMMA Lightweight Championship.
Win	15–9–1	Samuel Guillet	Submission (armbar)	XMMA 6: House of Pain	November 8, 2008	1	0:52	Montreal, Quebec, Canada	Won the XMMA Lightweight Championship.
Win	14–9–1	Zach Light	KO (punches)	EFC 6: Home Coming	October 11, 2008	1	2:47	Prince George, British Columbia, Canada	
Win	13–9–1	Douglas Evans	Submission (rear-naked choke)	Raw Combat: Resurrection	June 20, 2008	2	0:57	Calgary, Alberta, Canada	
Draw	12–9–1	Steve Claveau	Draw (majority)	XMMA 4	May 17, 2008	3	5:00	Saguenay, Quebec, Canada	
Loss	12–9	Rory MacDonald	TKO (elbows and punches)	KOTC Canada: Avalanche	December 15, 2007	3	1:48	Moncton, New Brunswick, Canada	For the KOTC Canadian Lightweight Championship.
Win	12–8	Dave Pariseau	Submission (rear-naked choke)	EFC 5: Revolution	November 3, 2007	1	2:04	Prince George, British Columbia, Canada	
Win	11–8	Jason St. Louis	TKO (submission to punches)	KOTC Canada: Megiddo	April 28, 2007	1	2:54	Vernon, British Columbia, Canada	
Win	10–8	Robert Hugus	Submission (armbar)	KOTC Canada: Detonator	September 29, 2006	1	4:29	Calgary, Alberta, Canada	
Win	9–8	Todd Steen	Submission (rear-naked choke)	Canada: Anarchy	February 11, 2006	1	3:58	Prince George, British Columbia, Canada	
Win	8–8	Gord Cummings	TKO (punches)	Extreme Fighting Challenge 4	October 15, 2005	1	4:06	Prince George, British Columbia, Canada	
Win	7–8	Roger Alves	Decision (split)	Extreme Fighting Challenge 3	October 16, 2004	3	5:00	Prince George, British Columbia, Canada	
Loss	6–8	Stephane Dube	KO (spinning back kick)	TKO 15: Unstoppable	February 28, 2004	1	4:06	Montreal, Quebec, Canada	
Loss	6–7	Thierry Quenneville	Decision (split)	TKO 14: Road Warriors	November 29, 2003	2	5:00	Victoriaville, Quebec, Canada	
Win	6–6	Jaime Renne	Submission (triangle choke)	Western Freestyle Championships	October 12, 2003	1	N/A	Vernon, British Columbia, Canada	
Loss	5–6	Mike Adams	Decision (unanimous)	WFF 5: New Blood	June 28, 2003	2	5:00	Kelowna, British Columbia, Canada	
Win	5–5	Jeremy Whittingham	Decision (unanimous)	MFC 7: Undisputed	May 31, 2003	2	5:00	Slave Lake, Alberta, Canada	
Loss	4–5	Chad Hamzeh	TKO (punches)	MFC 6: Road To Gold	February 22, 2003	N/A	N/A	Lethbridge, Alberta, Canada	
Win	4–4	Chris Ade	Decision (split)	XFC: Combat Showdown	November 23, 2002	2	5:00	Calgary, Alberta, Canada	
Loss	3–4	Justin Livingston	Decision (majority)	World Freestyle Fighting 3	October 25, 2002	2	5:00	Vancouver, British Columbia, Canada	
Loss	3–3	Len Smith	Decision (unanimous)	Roadhouse Rumble 6	October 5, 2002	2	5:00	Lethbridge, Alberta, Canada	
Loss	3–2	Josh Thomson	TKO (submission to elbows)	North American Sport Fighting Invitational	September 7, 2002	2	4:56	Boise, Idaho, United States	
Win	3–1	Aaron Krafczyk	TKO (submission to punches)	Border Town Brawl	July 27, 2002	1	N/A	Lloydminster, Alberta, Canada	
Win	2–1	Pedro Albuquerque	TKO (exhaustion)	Extreme Fighting Challenge 1	June 2, 2002	N/A	N/A	Prince George, British Columbia, Canada	
Loss	1–1	Justin Jones	TKO (submission to punches)	Ultimate Ring Challenge 2	April 27, 2002	2	N/A	Olympia, Washington, United States	
Win	1–0	Eric Harvey	TKO (submission to punches)	Roadhouse Rumble 5	February 23, 2002	N/A	N/A	Lethbridge, Alberta, Canada	

=== Exhibition record ===
Professional record breakdown
2 matches	1 win	1 loss
By knockout	0	1
By submission	1	0

Res.	Record	Opponent	Method	Event	Date	Round	Time	Location	Notes
Loss	1–1	Chad Laprise	KO (punch)	The Ultimate Fighter Nations: Canada vs. Australia	March 19, 2014 (airdate)	2	N/A	Quebec City, Quebec, Canada	Semi-finals
Win	1–0	Brendan O’Reilly	Submission (rear-naked choke)	The Ultimate Fighter Nations: Canada vs. Australia	January 15, 2014 (airdate)	1	N/A	Quebec City, Quebec, Canada	Quarter-finals

== See also ==
- List of current UFC fighters
- List of Canadian UFC fighters
