= MFC 25 =

Maximum Fighting Championship MMA event in 2010

MFC 25: Vindication was a mixed martial arts event held by the Maximum Fighting Championship (MFC) on May 7, 2010 at the Edmonton Expo Centre in Edmonton, Alberta. The event aired live on HDNet. The main event featured Thales Leites taking on Jesse Taylor in a middleweight bout.

== Background ==
A scheduled fight between David Heath and Solomon Hutcherson was cancelled due to an injury to Hutcherson.

== Results ==
Main Card
Weight class				Method	Round	Time	Notes
Middleweight	Thales Leites	def.	Jesse Taylor	Submission (Triangle Armbar)	1	2:27
Catchweight (208 lbs.)	Ryan Jimmo	def.	Wilson Gouveia	Decision (Unanimous)	3	5:00
Light Heavyweight	Emanuel Newton	def.	Dwayne Lewis	Decision (Unanimous)	3	5:00
Welterweight	Pete Spratt	def.	Luigi Fioravanti	TKO (Punches)	3	4:02
Welterweight	Gavin Neil	def.	Richie Hightower	Submission (Rear-Naked Choke)	1	2:52
Heavyweight	Chase Gormley	def.	Ryan Fortin	Decision (Unanimous)	3	5:00
Preliminary Card
Welterweight	Chad Freeman	def.	Mike Froese	Submission (Armbar)	1	3:48
Welterweight	Keto Allen	def.	Aaron Berke	TKO (Punches)	1	2:58
Lightweight	Jevon Marshall	def.	Garret Nybakken	Submission (Rear-Naked Choke)	3	2:00

== See also ==
- Maximum Fighting Championship
- List of Maximum Fighting Championship events
- 2010 in Maximum Fighting Championship
