= Pete Spratt =

American mixed martial arts fighter (born 1971)

- Born: January 9, 1971 (age 55); Denison, Texas, U.S.
- Other names: The Secret Weapon
- Height: 5 ft 9 in (1.75 m)
- Weight: 170 lb (77 kg; 12 st)
- Division: Welterweight; Middleweight
- Reach: 69 1/2 in (177 cm)
- Team: Team Spratt/Rodrigo Pinheiro Jiu-Jitsu
- Rank: Purple belt in Brazilian Jiu-Jitsu; Second degree black belt in Kenpō Karate
- Years active: 1999–2013, 2017

Kickboxing record
- Total: 18
- Wins: 15
- Losses: 3

Mixed martial arts record
- Total: 49
- Wins: 25
- By knockout: 17
- By submission: 5
- By decision: 3
- Losses: 24
- By knockout: 4
- By submission: 16
- By decision: 4

Other information
- Website: http://www.therealpetespratt.com/
- Mixed martial arts record from Sherdog

Pete Spratt (born January 9, 1971) is an American former professional mixed martial artist who competed in the Welterweight division. A professional competitor since 1999, Spratt has formerly competed for the UFC, the MFC, Legacy FC, Strikeforce, HDNet Fights, and Shark Fights.

== Background ==
Spratt was born in Denison, Texas and grew up in Sherman, Texas. In high school, Spratt ran track and was a track and field All-American going into his senior year, and still holds the Sherman High School record for the 400m and Triple Jump. He was also a first Team All-District and All-Area wide receiver on the football team, and a Second Team All-District guard on the basketball team. Spratt earned a full-scholarship to play football at Northwestern State University of Louisiana as their #1 recruit for the 1990 recruiting class. In college, Spratt finished his career at Southeastern Oklahoma State University in Durant, Oklahoma. As a four-year starter, he ended his career at Southeastern as their All-Time career leading receiver. He also finished his senior season as the Oklahoma Intercollegiate Conference Offensive Player of the year, as well as a NAIA first team All-American and finished second in the nation in receiving. He also excelled at track in college, and still holds records in the Triple Jump and Long Jump.

== Mixed martial arts career ==
Spratt made his mixed martial arts debut in early 1999 when he defeated Jeremiah O'Neal by submission (rear-naked choke) in the first round. He then won 9 of his next 14 fights including a win over MMA veteran Rich Clementi to bring his Mixed Martial Arts record to 10–5 before receiving his first call up to the UFC.

He made his debut for the promotion at UFC 37.5 against Zach Light. Spratt defeated Light by first round armbar submission.

Spratt was then defeated by former UFC Welterweight Champion Carlos Newton at UFC 40 before picking up arguably the best win of his mixed martial arts career at UFC 42 defeating Robbie Lawler by submission (due to hip injury) in the second round.

After defeating Lawler, Spratt was offered a shot at the UFC Welterweight Championship along with an $8000 + $8000 contract [$8000 to fight, $8000 for an eventual win]. Spratt wanted $25000 + $8000 (his opponent was getting $50000 + $50000), but UFC declined. Spratt turned down the offer, gave the statement that he felt he was not ready to fight reigning champion Matt Hughes, and was subsequently released from the promotion.

=== The Ultimate Fighter ===
He was one of the cast members of The Ultimate Fighter 4, which unlike every other season of the show featured past veterans from the UFC. Although he lost both of his exhibition fights, he was featured on the season finale, defeating Jeremy Jackson by submission (due to neck injury). Spratt then returned to the Octagon at UFC 69 where he was defeated by Marcus Davis. His last fight in the UFC was against Tamdan McCrory at UFC Fight Night 10 where he lost via triangle choke.

=== Maximum Fighting Championship ===
Since being cut from the UFC, Spratt has fought on regional shows, where his submission defense has been exposed on many occasions, while also picking up some impressive wins mainly due to his strong stand-up skills and heavy hands.

Most notably, Spratt has fought in the Canadian regional promotion Maximum Fighting Championship where he made his debut at MFC 15: Rags to Riches losing to Ryan Ford via rear-naked choke. He then returned to the promotion over a year later at MFC 22: Payoff where he defeated Nathan Gunn via knockout in the second round.

Spratt next fought Keith Wisniewski on 2 January 2010 losing via submission (rear-naked choke) in the first round but he bounced back in his third fight with the MFC promotion by defeating UFC veteran Luigi Fioravanti via TKO in the third round. In this fight Spratt showed improved takedown defense and ground game.

Spratt was then submitted in his next two fights losing first by guillotine choke to Eric Davila at Shark Fights 13: Jardine vs Prangley before being defeated by Ryan Ford for the second time in their rematch at MFC 25: Vindication via rear-naked choke.

Spratt faced Demi Deeds on 8 April 2011 at MFC 29: Conquer. After a close first round, Spratt turned up the pressure in the second landing some strong leg kicks and punches until he got on top of Deeds late in the round before quickly transitioning to an impressive armbar finish to gain his first win in almost a year.

Spratt faced Marcus Davis at MFC 30, replacing an injured Richie Whitson, This was a rematch of their first encounter, which Davis won by submission at UFC 69. He lost the fight via unanimous decision.

=== Independent Promotions ===
On July 22, 2011, at LFC 7 Spratt racked up his fastest knockout to date, defeating Antonio Flores with a clean overhand left only 18 seconds into the opening round.

March 30, 2012 he fought Daniel Acácio and KO'd him at exactly the 5 minute mark at the end of the third round, due to this technicality the fight was scored a technical decision.

Spratt faced Dan Hornbuckle on February 1, 2013 at Legacy FC 17. He lost the fight via unanimous decision.

Spratt faced UFC vet Tim Means on September 13, 2013 at Legacy FC 23, He lost the fight via knockout due to elbows and punches in the first round. After his loss to Means, he announced his retirement from MMA fighting. Spratt later changed his mind about retiring and after reviewing the footage claimed that while the elbow knocked him down, it was the follow-up punches that knocked him out and because they were shots to the back of his head they were illegal shots, and the fight should have been ruled a No-Contest due to illegal strikes. Spratt also stated he would officially appeal the decision with the Athletic Commission; it is unknown whether or not Spratt did submit an appeal, but if he did it was rejected as his fight with Means is still recorded as a loss by popular MMA record keeping sites. Tim Means's manager Tom Vaughn and Legacy FC promoter Mick Maynard didn't respond to MMA Junkie's request for comment regarding Spratt's claim.

=== Return to MMA ===
Returning from a one-year retirement, Spratt was expected to face Shane Campbell at MFC 41 on October 3, 2014. However, the bout was cancelled for unknown reasons.

== Personal life ==
Spratt and his wife had a daughter on March 25, 2008. He has two daughters from a previous relationship.

== Championships and accomplishments ==
=== Mixed martial arts ===
- Ultimate Fighting Championship
  - UFC Encyclopedia Awards
    - Submission of the Night (One time) vs. Zach Light

ISKA U.S. Middleweight Champion

- Ring of Fire
  - ROF Middleweight Championship (One time)
- Reality Combat Fighting
  - RCF Middleweight Championship (One time)
- Renegades Extreme Fighting
  - REF Middleweight Championship (Two times)
  - REF Middleweight Tournament Runner Up

== Kickboxing record (incomplete) ==
Kickboxing record
15 wins, 3 losses, 0 draws
Date	Result	Opponent	Event	Location	Method	Round	Time
2006-03-03	Loss	(United States) Kevin Engel	World Combat League	Las Vegas, Nevada, USA	Decision (30–25)	1	3:00
Legend: Win Loss Draw/No contest Notes

== Mixed martial arts record ==
Professional record breakdown
49 matches	25 wins	24 losses
By knockout	17	4
By submission	5	16
By decision	3	4

Res.	Record	Opponent	Method	Event	Date	Round	Time	Location	Notes
Loss	25–24	Washington Luiz	KO (punches)	Fury FC 20	December 9, 2017	2	1:40	San Antonio, Texas, United States	
Loss	25–23	Tim Means	KO (elbows and punches)	Legacy FC 23	September 13, 2013	1	2:24	San Antonio, Texas, United States	Retired after the fight.
Loss	25–22	Dan Hornbuckle	Decision (unanimous)	Legacy FC 17	February 1, 2013	3	5:00	San Antonio, Texas, United States	
Win	25–21	Daniel Acácio	Technical Decision (unanimous)	AFC: Amazon Forest Combat 2	March 31, 2012	3	5:00	Manaus, Brazil	Acacio was knocked out with a spinning backfist, it was after the five-minute mark and it went to a decision.
Win	24–21	Martin Grandmont	TKO (punches)	Instinct MMA 2	December 2, 2011	2	4:00	Quebec City, Canada	
Loss	23–21	Jorge Patino	Decision (split)	Legacy FC 8	September 16, 2011	5	5:00	Houston, Texas, United States	For Legacy FC Welterweight Championship.
Win	23–20	Antonio Flores	TKO (punch)	Legacy FC 7	July 22, 2011	1	0:18	Houston, Texas, United States	
Loss	22–20	Marcus Davis	Decision (unanimous)	MFC 30: Up Close & Personal	June 10, 2011	3	5:00	Edmonton, Alberta, Canada	
Win	22–19	Demi Deeds	Submission (armbar)	MFC 29: Conquer	April 8, 2011	2	4:19	Windsor, Ontario, Canada	
Loss	21–19	Ryan Ford	Submission (rear-naked choke)	MFC 27	November 12, 2010	2	3:07	Edmonton, Alberta, Canada	
Loss	21–18	Eric Davila	Submission (guillotine choke)	Shark Fights 13: Jardine vs Prangley	September 11, 2010	2	3:49	Amarillo, Texas, United States	
Win	21–17	Luigi Fioravanti	TKO (punches)	MFC 25	May 7, 2010	3	4:02	Edmonton, Alberta, Canada	
Loss	20–17	Keith Wisniewski	Submission (rear-naked choke)	Hoosier FC 2: It's On	January 2, 2010	1	4:07	Hammond, Indiana, United States	
Win	20–16	Nathan Gunn	KO (punch)	MFC 22	October 2, 2009	2	4:19	Edmonton, Alberta, Canada	
Win	19–16	Alan Woods	Submission (armbar)	SCMMA 1: Battle of the Texas Titans	June 11, 2009	1	3:56	Frisco, Texas, United States	
Loss	18–16	Donnie Liles	Submission (rear-naked choke)	Strikeforce: Payback	October 3, 2008	3	1:59	Denver, Colorado, United States	
Loss	18–15	John Alessio	Submission (rear-naked choke)	Banner Promotions: Night of Combat	June 20, 2008	2	2:07	Las Vegas, Nevada, United States	
Win	18–14	Jason Von Flue	KO (punch)	UWC 3: Invasion	April 26, 2008	1	2:34	Fairfax, Virginia, United States	
Loss	17–14	Ryan Ford	Submission (rear-naked choke)	MFC 15: Rags to Riches	February 22, 2008	2	4:01	Edmonton, Alberta, Canada	
Win	17–13	Tristan Yunker	TKO (cut)	HDNet Fights: Reckless Abandon	December 15, 2007	1	1:38	Dallas, Texas, United States	
Win	16–13	TJ Waldburger	KO (punches)	HDNet Fights	October 13, 2007	1	1:29	Dallas, Texas, United States	
Loss	15–13	TJ Waldburger	Submission (triangle choke)	King of Kombat	September 7, 2007	2	1:30	Austin, Texas, United States	
Loss	15–12	Tamdan McCrory	Submission (triangle choke)	UFC Fight Night: Stout vs Fisher	June 12, 2007	2	2:04	Houston, Texas, United States	
Loss	15–11	Marcus Davis	Submission (achilles lock)	UFC 69	April 7, 2007	2	2:57	Houston, Texas, United States	
Win	15–10	Jeremy Jackson	TKO (neck injury)	The Ultimate Fighter: The Comeback Finale	November 11, 2006	2	1:11	Las Vegas, Nevada, United States	
Win	14–10	Matt Brown	Decision (unanimous)	International Freestyle Fighting 1	May 6, 2006	3	5:00	Fort Worth, Texas, United States	
Loss	13–10	Josh Koscheck	Submission (rear-naked choke)	UFC Ultimate Fight Night	August 6, 2005	1	1:53	Las Vegas, Nevada, United States	
Win	13–9	Wataru Takahashi	KO (punch)	Shoot Boxing: Ground Zero Fukuoka	January 23, 2005	1	2:56	Fukuoka, Fukuoka, Japan	
Loss	12–9	John Cronk	Submission (rear-naked choke)	Venom: First Strike	September 8, 2004	1	4:43	Huntington Beach, California, United States	
Loss	12–8	Chris Lytle	Submission (rear-naked choke)	RSF: Shooto Challenge 2	January 2, 2004	1	0:46	Illinois, United States	
Loss	12–7	Georges St-Pierre	Submission (rear-naked choke)	TKO 14: Road Warriors	November 29, 2003	1	3:40	Victoriaville, Quebec, Canada	
Win	12–6	Robbie Lawler	TKO (knee injury)	UFC 42	April 25, 2003	2	2:28	Miami, Florida, United States	
Loss	11–6	Carlos Newton	Submission (kimura)	UFC 40	November 22, 2002	1	1:45	Las Vegas, Nevada, United States	
Win	11–5	Zach Light	Submission (armbar)	UFC 37.5	June 22, 2002	1	2:25	Bossier City, Louisiana, United States	
Loss	10–5	Steve Berger	TKO (cut)	UA 1: The Genesis	January 27, 2002	1	2:14	Hammond, Indiana, United States	
Win	10–4	Brian Sleeman	TKO (submission to punches)	GC 7: Casualties of War	November 4, 2001	1	N/A	Colusa, California, United States	
Loss	9–4	Ronald Jhun	KO (knee)	Warriors Quest 2: Battle of Champions	August 1, 2001	3	4:36	Honolulu, Hawaii, United States	
Win	9–3	Jay Jack	TKO (punches)	Ring of Fire 3	June 9, 2001	1	0:55	Denver, Colorado, United States	
Loss	8–3	Hector Garza	Submission	Renegades Extreme Fighting	March 23, 2001	1	2:33	Texas, United States	
Loss	8–2	Cruz Chacon	Decision (majority)	ROF 2: Trial By Fire	February 10, 2001	3	3:00	Denver, Colorado, United States	
Win	8–1	Rich Clementi	TKO (doctor stoppage)	Reality Combat Fighting 9	January 27, 2001	1	N/A	Houma, Louisiana, United States	
Win	7–1	Jason House	KO (punches)	Bushido 1	January 18, 2001	1	N/A	Tempe, Arizona, United States	
Win	6–1	Bone Sayavonga	TKO (submission to strikes)	Renegades Extreme Fighting	November 7, 2000	1	1:36	Texas, United States	
Win	5–1	Cedric Marks	Submission	Renegades Extreme Fighting	November 7, 2000	1	9:55	Texas, United States	
Loss	4–1	Yves Edwards	Submission (triangle choke)	Renegades Extreme Fighting	July 15, 2000	1	N/A	Texas, United States	
Win	4–0	Doug Carpenter	Decision	Renegades Extreme Fighting	May 31, 2000	1	10:00	Houston, Texas, United States	
Win	3–0	Rolando Aguilar	KO	Renegades Extreme Fighting	May 31, 2000	1	N/A	Houston, Texas, United States	
Win	2–0	Keith Sutton	KO	Extreme Shootout: The Underground	April 1, 2000	N/A	N/A	Killeen, Texas, United States	
Win	1–0	Jeremiah O'Neal	Submission (rear-naked choke)	Power Ring Warriors	February 19, 1999	1	N/A	Texas, United States	
