= Enoch Cree Nation 135 =

Enoch Cree Nation 135 ᒪᐢᑫᑯᓯᐦᐠ (Cree) maskêkosihk (Cree)
- Indian reserve
- Enoch Cree Nation Indian Reserve No. 135
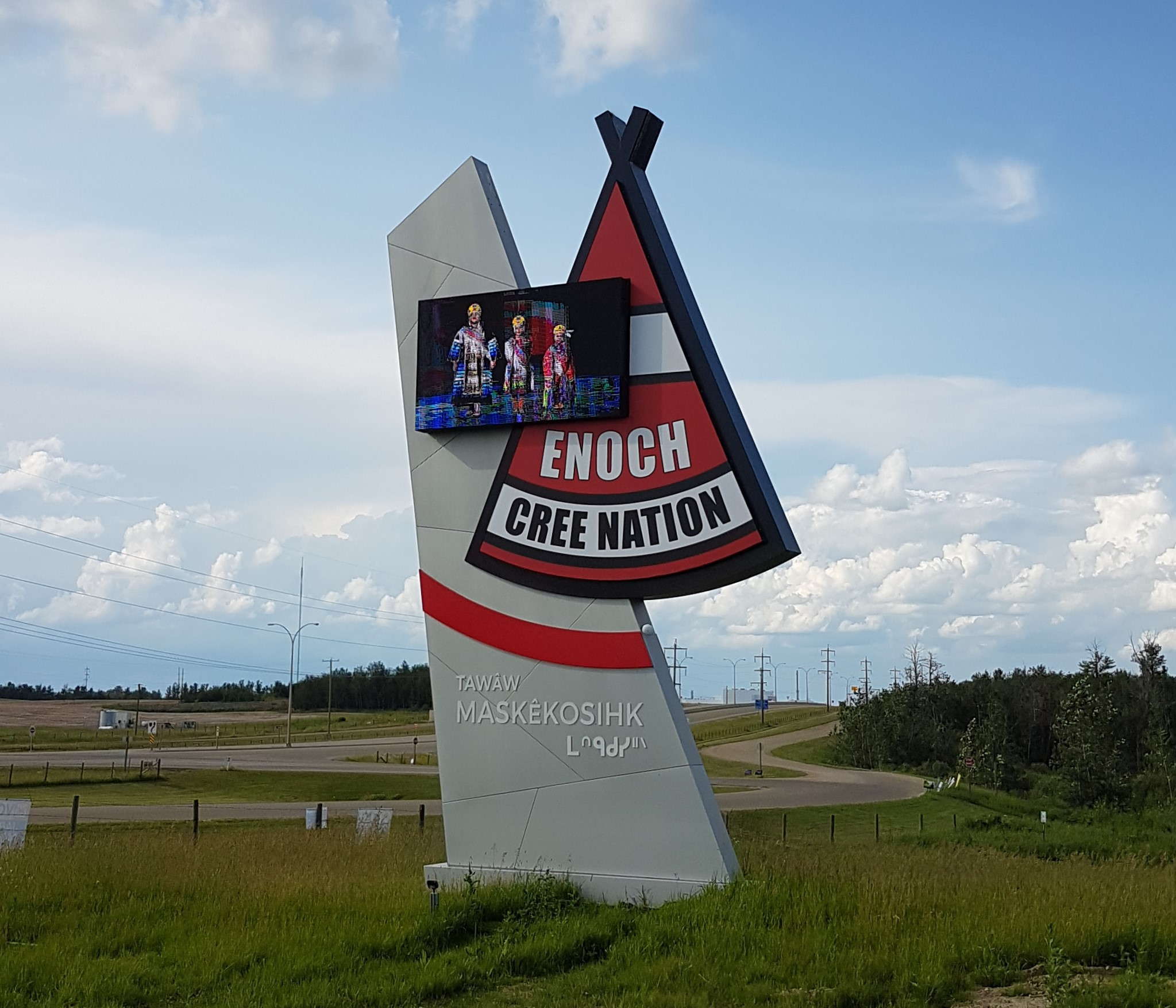
- Welcome sign

- Boundaries of Enoch Cree Nation 135

- Location in Alberta
- Coordinates: 53°28′59″N 113°45′06″W
- First Nation: Enoch Cree
- Treaty: 6
- Country: Canada
- Province: Alberta
- Municipal district: Parkland

Government
  - Chief: Cody Thomas
  - Governing body: Enoch Cree Nation

Area
  - Total: 5,306.2 ha (13,112 acres)

Population (2016)
  - Total: 1,690
  - Density: 32.8/km^{2} (85/sq mi)
- Time zone: UTC−06:00 (Alberta Time)
- Postal Code: T7X 3Y3
- Area codes: 780, 587 and 825
- Highways: 60, 628
- Website: enochnation.ca

Enoch Cree Nation 135, (Cree: ᒪᐢᑫᑯᓯᐦᐠ, romanized: maskêkosihk /məsˈkeɪɡoʊsiːk/) previously known as Stony Plain No. 135, is an Indian reserve of the Enoch Cree Nation #440 in Alberta. It is adjacent to the City of Edmonton to the east and Parkland County to the north, west, and south.

== Geography ==
The locality of Enoch is on the Enoch Cree Nation 135 reserve.

== Demographics ==
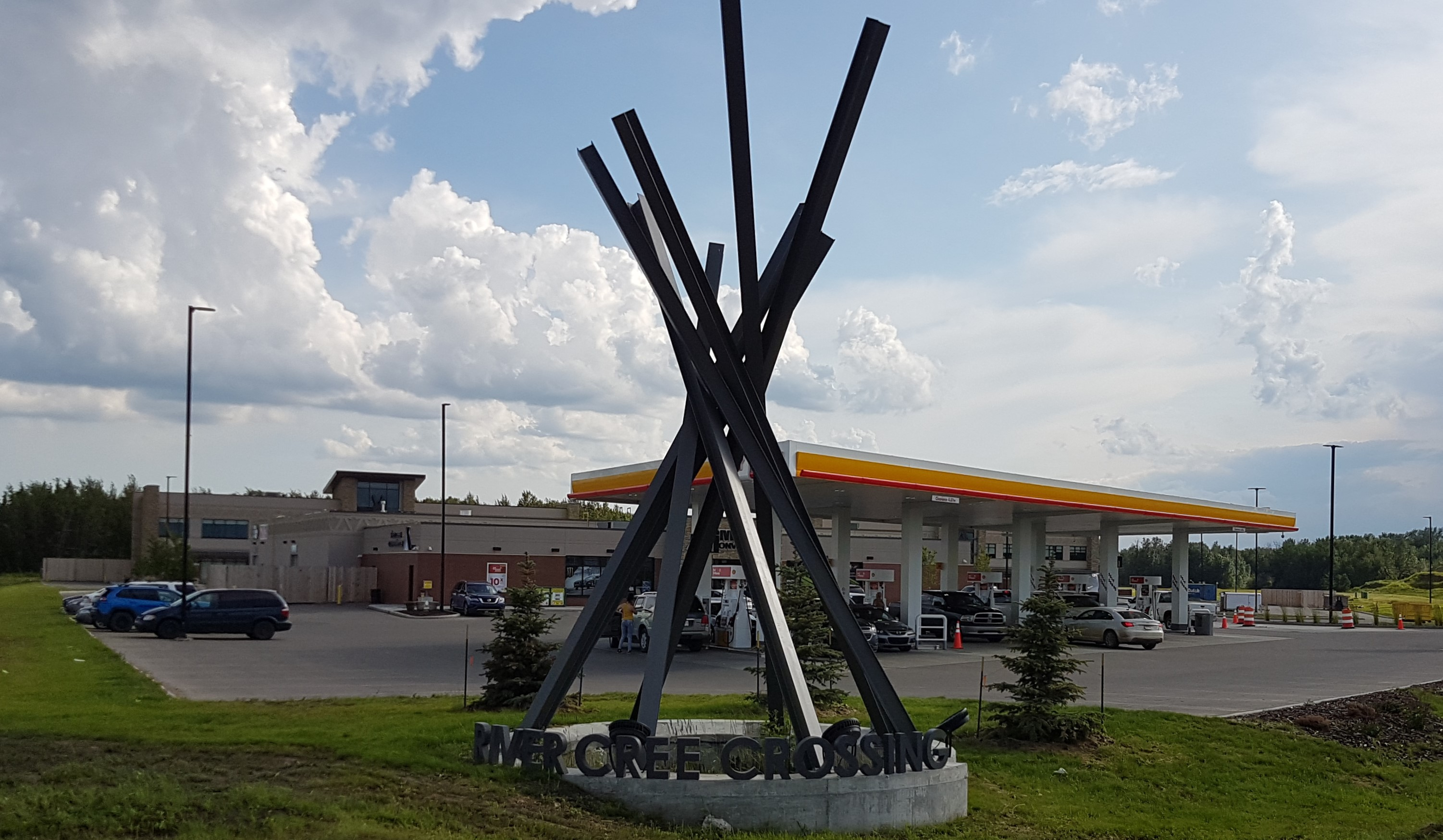
River Cree Crossing is a commercial development in the northeast corner of the reserve, adjacent to the City of Edmonton.

In 2016 Enoch Cree Nation 135 had a population of 1,690 living in 576 dwellings, a 71.2% increase from 2011. The Indian reserve has a land area of 51.55 km^{2} (19.90 sq mi) and a population density of 32.8/km^{2} (85/sq mi).

According to the Canada 2016 Census:

- Population: 1,690
- % Change (2011–2016): +71.2%
- Dwellings: 576
- Area (km^{2}): 51.55
- Density (persons per km^{2}): 32.8

== See also ==
- List of communities in Alberta
- List of Indian reserves in Alberta
- Tsuut'ina 145, a reserve similarly adjacent to the City of Calgary
