= Josh Haynes =

American mixed martial arts fighter

- Born: July 30, 1977 (age 49); Grants Pass, Oregon, U.S.
- Other names: Bring The Pain
- Height: 5 ft 9 in (1.75 m)
- Weight: 205 lb (93 kg; 14.6 st)
- Division: Welterweight; Middleweight; Light Heavyweight (current)
- Stance: Orthodox
- Fighting out of: Medford, Oregon
- Team: Team Quest
- Years active: 2002-2010

Mixed martial arts record
- Total: 28
- Wins: 17
- By knockout: 6
- By submission: 9
- By decision: 2
- Losses: 11
- By knockout: 5
- By submission: 1
- By decision: 5

Other information
- Mixed martial arts record from Sherdog

Joshua Lee Haynes (born July 30, 1977) is an American former mixed martial artist. He fought out of Las Vegas, Nevada, with Xtreme Couture where he was also a coach. His MMA record is 17 wins, 11 losses. He was also a contestant on the third season of The Ultimate Fighter reality television show, training under Tito Ortiz. Fellow Team Quest member, Ed Herman would fight under Ken Shamrock's team. He stands 5 ft 9 in (1.75 m) and fights in the 170 lb (77 kg), 185 lb (84 kg), and 205 lb (93 kg) weight classes. In The Ultimate Fighter, he won a controversial victory against Tait Fletcher by decision after the second round. In the semifinals, he defeated Jesse Forbes by guillotine choke in the second round. He was defeated by Michael Bisping in the finals due to strikes.

== Personal information ==
Haynes was born in Grants Pass, Oregon. He has a bachelor's degree in Computer Information Systems from Southern Oregon University in Ashland, Oregon.

Haynes is currently a police officer in Las Vegas since retiring from MMA according to MMA Insight.

Haynes was on duty during the 2017 Las Vegas shooting. Haynes saved a rookie officer's life, who had been shot in the shoulder, which lodged in his chest, by getting him out of the area, while under fire, and driving him to the hospital, as it was not possible to get an ambulance to the scene. Both he and the wounded officer were visited by President Donald Trump, along with other victims. Haynes later issues a statement, where he detailed the incident from his perspective and expressed condolences to other victims.

== Mixed martial arts record ==
Professional record breakdown
28 matches	17 wins	11 losses
By knockout	6	5
By submission	9	1
By decision	2	5

Res.	Record	Opponent	Method	Event	Date	Round	Time	Location	Notes
Loss	17–11	Eliot Marshall	Decision (unanimous)	ROF 39 - Summer Brawl 2	August 27, 2010	3	5:00	Denver, Colorado, United States	
Win	17–10	Rafael del Real	Decision (split)	WarGods/Ken Shamrock Productions: Valentine's Eve Massacre	February 13, 2009	3	5:00	Fresno, California, United States	
Win	16–10	Sean Salmon	Submission (achilles lock)	SuperFights MMA - Night of Combat 2	October 11, 2008	2	2:49	Las Vegas, Nevada, United States	
Loss	15–10	Mojo Horne	Decision (unanimous)	MMA BigShow	May 10, 2008	3	5:00	Belterra, Indiana, United States	
Win	15–9	Leopoldo Serao	Decision (unanimous)	IFL – Las Vegas	February 29, 2008	3	5:00	Las Vegas, Nevada, United States	
Loss	14–9	Cedric Marks	KO (strikes)	XFC Battlegrounds	November 10, 2007	3		San Antonio, Texas, United States	
Win	14–8	Steve Heath	KO	WC – Warrior Cup	October 12, 2007	1	N/A	Stockton, California, United States	
Win	13–8	John Cornett	KO (punch)	IFO: Kimmons vs. Yunker	September 21, 2007	3	2:37	Las Vegas, Nevada, United States	
Loss	12–8	Luke Cummo	KO (punch)	UFC 69	April 7, 2007	2	2:45	Houston, Texas, United States	
Loss	12–7	Rory Singer	Decision (unanimous)	Ortiz vs. Shamrock 3: The Final Chapter	October 10, 2006	3	5:00	Hollywood, Florida, United States	
Loss	12–6	Michael Bisping	TKO (strikes)	The Ultimate Fighter: Team Ortiz vs. Team Shamrock Finale	June 24, 2006	2	4:14	Las Vegas, Nevada, United States	The Ultimate Fighter Season 3 Light Heavyweight tournament final.
Win	12–5	Seth Kleinbeck	Submission (rear naked choke)	FFC 15 – Fiesta Las Vegas	September 14, 2005	2	1:16	Las Vegas, Nevada, United States	
Loss	11–5	Shonie Carter	Decision (unanimous)	IFC – Rock N'Rumble	July 30, 2005	3	5:00	Reno, Nevada, United States	
Loss	11–4	Horace Spencer	TKO (referee stoppage)	DB 14 – Desert Brawl 14	July 23, 2005	1		Bend, Oregon, United States	
Win	11–3	Delon Williams	Submission (guillotine choke)	SF 11 – Rumble at the Rose Garden	July 9, 2005	2	2:39	Portland, Oregon, United States	
Win	10–3	Marcos Oliveira	Submission (guillotine choke)	XFC – Dome of Destruction 1	April 29, 2005	1	3:21	Tacoma, Washington, United States	
Win	9–3	Carlos Garcia	TKO	UCF: Festival of Freaks	April 9, 2005	N/A		Oregon, United States	
Win	8–3	Jake Villanueva	KO	UCF: Holiday Massacre	December 18, 2004	N/A		Medford, Oregon, United States	
Loss	7–3	Vince Lucero	Submission (rear naked choke)	LOTC – Lords of the Cage	June 5, 2004	2	2:08	Anacortes, Washington, United States	
Loss	7–2	Jerry Vrbanovic	Decision	ROTR – Rage on the River	April 17, 2004	3	3:00	Redding, California, United States	
Win	7–1	Kyle Kenny	Submission (guillotine choke)	USA MMA – Extreme Cage Combat	March 6, 2004	1		Shelton, Washington, United States	
Win	6–1	Dave Hagen	Submission	FCFF – Rumble at the Roseland 10	December 13, 2003	1	0:32	Portland, Oregon, United States	
Win	5–1	Trent Standing	TKO	FCFF – Rumble at the Roseland 9	July 12, 2003	2	4:36	Portland, Oregon, United States	
Win	4–1	Jim Pope	Submission (guillotine choke)	URC 4 – Ultimate Ring Challenge	March 29, 2003	1	0:34	Kelso, Washington, United States	
Win	3–1	Jordan Ramos	TKO	Xtreme Ring Wars	March 15, 2003	1	N/A	Wenatchee, Washington, United States	
Win	2–1	Karl Pope	Submission	FCFF: Fight Night 2	October 5, 2002	N/A		Medford, Oregon, United States	
Win	1–1	Josh Bennett	Submission	FCFF – Rumble at the Roseland 4	August 10, 2002	2	0:43	Oregon, United States	
Loss	0–1	Larry Vandervort	TKO	FCFF – Rumble at the Roseland 3	May 11, 2002	N/A		Oregon, United States	
