= Marcos Oliveira =

Brazilian Brazilian jiu-jitsu practitioner and mixed martial arts fighter

Marcos Santa Cruz Oliveira
- Born: June 21, 1978 (age 48); Rio de Janeiro, Brazil
- Other names: Santa Cruz
- Weight: 257 lb (117 kg)
- Division: Heavyweight
- Style: Judo, Brazilian Jiu-Jitsu, Capoeira
- Fighting out of: Rio de Janeiro, Brazil
- Team: Abu Dhabi Combat Club
- Rank: Black belt in Brazilian Jiu-Jitsu, black dan in Judo, black belt in Capoeira
- Years active: 2004-2011

Mixed martial arts record
- Total: 8
- Wins: 5
- By knockout: 2
- By decision: 2
- Unknown: 1
- Losses: 3
- By knockout: 1
- By submission: 1
- By decision: 1

Other information
- Mixed martial arts record from Sherdog

Marcos Oliveira (born June 21, 1978) is a professional Brazilian jiu-jitsu and mixed martial arts fighter from Brazil. He competes in the heavyweight division of Brazilian jiu-jitsu.

Oliveira received his black belt in judo in 1995. He received his brown belt and his black belt in mixed martial arts in December 2006.

In 2010, Oliveira was invited to compete in the Abu Dhabi Fighting Championship Open Weight Grand Prix. He defeated Johan Romming in the first round and Neil Wain in the second round to reach the "one-million-dirham (US$272,260.72)" final. Oliveira went to Thailand to improve his striking before the final fight. However, he lost to Russia's Shamil Abdurakhimov in round three. He retired after this fight.

== Mixed martial arts record ==
Professional record breakdown
| 8 matches | 5 wins | 3 losses |
| By knockout | 2 | 1 |
| By submission | 1 | 1 |
| By decision | 2 | 1 |

| Res. | Record | Opponent | Method | Event | Date | Round | Time | Location | Notes |
|---|---|---|---|---|---|---|---|---|---|
| Loss | 5–3 | Shamil Abdurakhimov | TKO (punches) | ADFC: Round 3 | March 11, 2011 | 1 | 1:56 | Abu Dhabi, UAE | ADFC Heavyweight tournament finals |
| Win | 5–2 | Neil Wain | Decision (unanimous) | ADFC: Round 2 | October 22, 2010 | 3 | 5:00 | Abu Dhabi, UAE | Advanced to the finals |
| Win | 4–2 | Johan Romming | KO (punch) | ADFC: Round 1 | May 14, 2010 | 1 | 0:19 | Abu Dhabi, UAE | Advanced to second round |
| Win | 3–2 | Kevin Jordan | Decision (unanimous) | FFP - Untamed 22 | August 23, 2008 | 3 | 5:00 | Plymouth, Massachusetts, United States | |
| Win | 2–2 | Sean Thompson | TKO (punches) | NACC - North American Combat Challenge | June 18, 2005 | 1 | 2:38 | Key West, Florida, United States | |
| Loss | 1–2 | Josh Haynes | Submission (guillotine choke) | XFC - Dome Of Destruction 1 | April 29, 2005 | 1 | 3:21 | Tacoma, Washington, United States | |
| Loss | 1–1 | Warren Kikaba | Decision (unanimous) | FCC 16 - Freestyle Combat Challenge 16 | September 25, 2004 | 3 | 5:00 | Racine, Wisconsin, United States | |
| Win | 1–0 | Anthony Barbier | Submission (D'Arce choke) | BONO 15 - Battle of New Orleans 15 | August 21, 2004 | 1 | 1:29 | Metairie, Louisiana, United States | |
