= Matt Hamill =

American mixed martial arts fighter

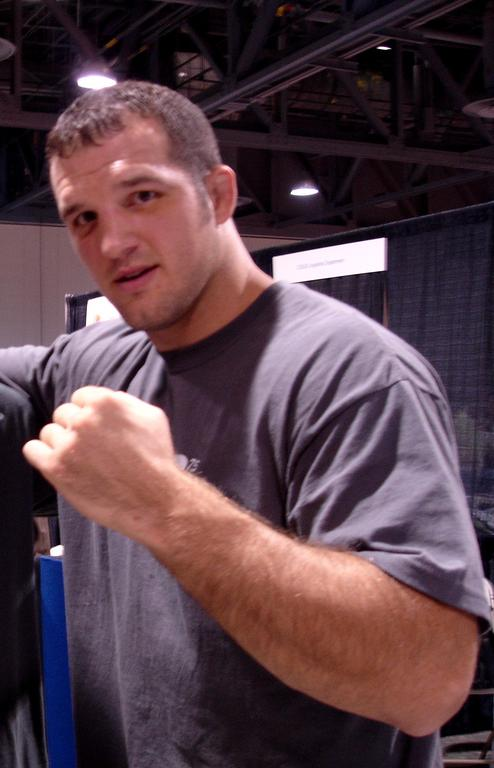
- Born: October 5, 1976 (age 50); Loveland, Ohio, U.S.
- Other names: The Hammer
- Height: 6 ft 2 in (1.88 m)
- Weight: 205 lb (93 kg; 14 st 9 lb)
- Division: Light Heavyweight
- Reach: 76 in (193 cm)
- Style: Wrestling
- Fighting out of: Utica, New York, U.S.
- Rank: NCAA Division III Wrestling; Purple belt in Brazilian jiu-jitsu
- Years active: 2005–2018 (MMA)

Mixed martial arts record
- Total: 21
- Wins: 13
- By knockout: 8
- By decision: 4
- By disqualification: 1
- Losses: 8
- By knockout: 4
- By submission: 1
- By decision: 3

Other information
- Mixed martial arts record from Sherdog

Matthew Hamill (born October 5, 1976) is an American former mixed martial artist and wrestler who competed in the Light Heavyweight division of the UFC. He is a three-time NCAA Division III National Champion in wrestling (167 lb class in 1997, 190 lb class in 1998, and 197 lb class in 1999) while attending the Rochester Institute of Technology (RIT) in Rochester, New York. He is notable for being the first deaf fighter to compete in the UFC.

== Early life ==
Hamill has been deaf since birth. He was introduced to wrestling by his stepfather Michael Rich, who was the head wrestling coach at Loveland High School. Hamill attended the Rochester Institute of Technology for three years transferring there after a year at Purdue University.

== Mixed martial arts career ==
=== The Ultimate Fighter ===
Hamill was on The Ultimate Fighter 3 reality television show, training under former UFC Light Heavyweight Champion Tito Ortiz in the 205 lb (93 kg) weight class. During his time on the show, he was perceived by teammate Michael Bisping as being the favorite of coach Ortiz. He won a preliminary fight against Mike Nickels via decision. He was scheduled to fight eventual season winner Bisping, but was unable to continue into the semi-finals after sustaining an injury during training.

=== Ultimate Fighting Championship ===
On June 24, 2006, Hamill fought fellow contestant Jesse Forbes at The Ultimate Fighter 3 Finale on Spike TV and won via knockout.

Hamill faced The Ultimate Fighter 2's Seth Petruzelli in a Fight of The Night performance he won via unanimous decision at Ortiz vs. Shamrock 3: The Final Chapter on October 10, 2006. Judges scored the bout (29–28, 30–27, and 29–28) for Hamill.

Hamill then fought Rex Holman at UFC 68: The Uprising where he won by TKO in the first round.

Hamill fought fellow TUF 3 alumnus Michael Bisping at UFC 75 in London, England on September 8, 2007, where he lost via split decision. The decision was considered controversial as many believed Hamill won the fight after outstriking Bisping in the first and second rounds and landing two takedowns each round. A rematch was scheduled for UFC 78, but due to knee surgery, Hamill withdrew. A rematch since became unlikely because Bisping subsequently dropped down to the Middleweight division after losing a split decision to Rashad Evans. The controversial decision prompted outrage from the crowd towards Bisping, and helped turn Hamill into a marketable star while cementing Bisping's reputation as a heel.

Hamill next fought Tim Boetsch on April 3, 2008, whom he defeated in the second round by TKO, bringing his record to 4 wins and 1 loss. During the fight, Hamill had a badly split bottom lip due to a knee strike.

Hamill then went on to fight at UFC 88 against former UFC Middleweight Champion Rich Franklin as the co-main event. He lost the fight by TKO after a kick to the liver at 0:39 of the third round.

At UFC 92, Hamill defeated Reese Andy in the second round by TKO due to strikes.

Hamill fought former NCAA wrestling champion Mark Muñoz at UFC 96, defeating him with a right leg roundhouse kick to the head, knocking Munoz unconscious and earning him the Knockout of the Night award.

His next fight was scheduled to be Brandon Vera at UFC 102, but due to a knee injury while training, Hamill was replaced by Krzysztof Soszynski.

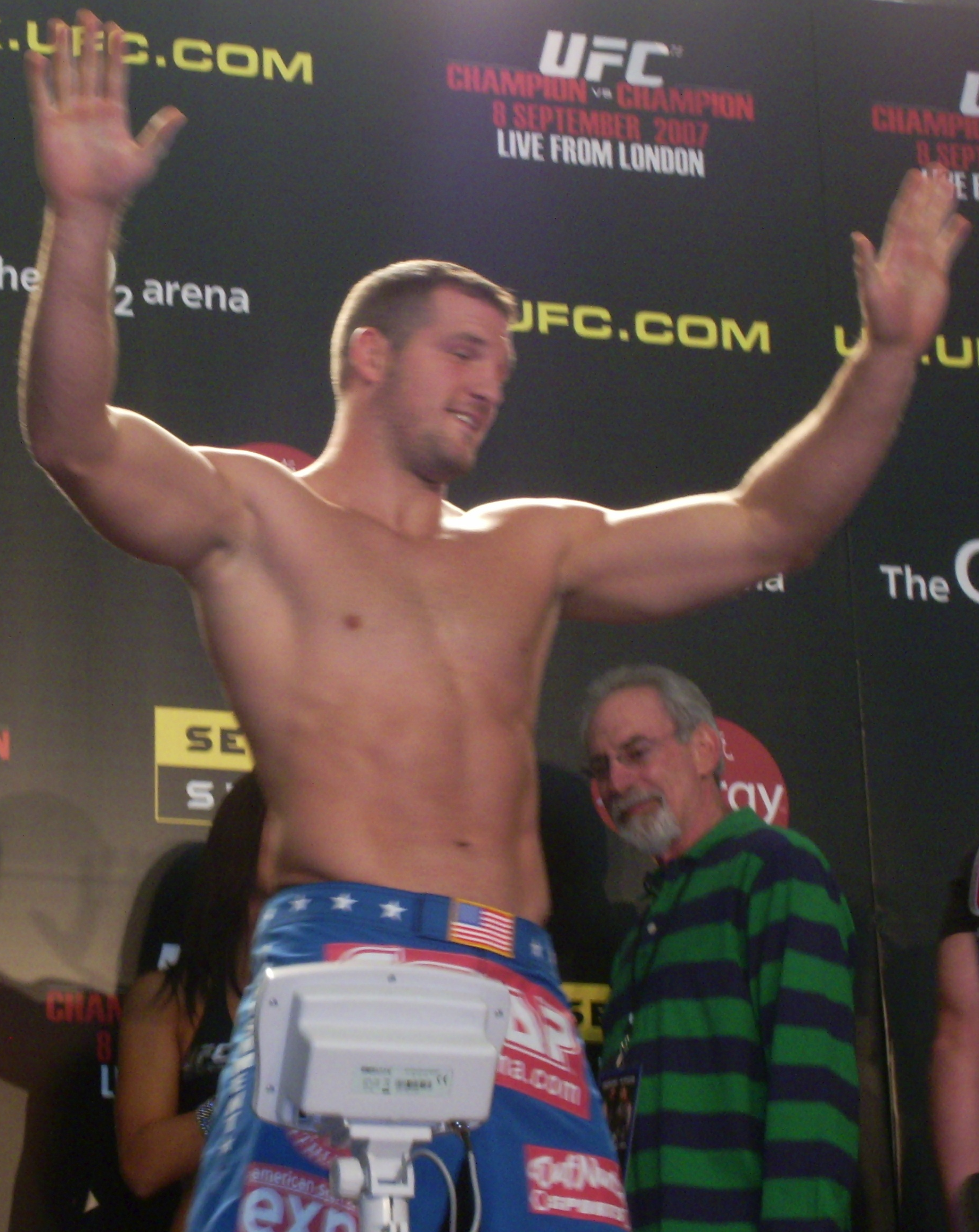
Hamill at the UFC 75 weigh ins before facing Michael Bisping

Coming off of knee surgery, Hamill became sick. Hamill faced off against undefeated prospect Jon Jones on December 5, 2009, at The Ultimate Fighter: Heavyweights Finale. Jones would be disqualified for using illegal 12–6 elbows. The unified rules of mixed martial arts prohibit downward elbow strikes, and Jones was initially only penalized a point from the round. However, because Hamill could not continue due to his dislocated shoulder, he was awarded the DQ win. Consequently, the tape was reviewed and showed that Jones' elbows further damaged Hamill's already bloody and lacerated nose. This marked the first time that Nevada has used its recently enacted instant replay rule, in which the referee's decision was supported by the commission which utilized a slow motion replay to review the elbows. Hamill contested the decision, stating after the fight that he "definitely didn't win" and Jones "definitely didn't lose".

Hamill defeated Keith Jardine on June 19, 2010, at The Ultimate Fighter: Team Liddell vs. Team Ortiz Finale. Hamill won this fight by majority decision. Jardine was docked a point for accidentally poking Hamill in the eye in round 2.

Hamill next fought his former The Ultimate Fighter 3 coach, Tito Ortiz on October 23, 2010, at UFC 121 which he won via unanimous decision.

Hamill was next scheduled to face undefeated Phil Davis at UFC 129. It was then announced that Thiago Silva had failed his UFC 125 post fight drug test, and Hamill was named as his replacement in his bout against former UFC light heavyweight champion and current top contender Quinton Jackson. Hamill lost the fight via a one sided unanimous decision.

At UFC 133 Hamill faced off against up and coming Swedish striker Alexander Gustafsson, replacing an injured Vladimir Matyushenko. After an uneventful first round, Gustafsson dropped Hamill in the second with a straight punch followed by an uppercut, subsequently finishing Hamill with punches and elbows from the mount.

On August 8, 2011, Matt Hamill decided to step away from the UFC and MMA, as he lost his last two fights. "Today is a sad day for me. After six years and 13 fights in the UFC I'm ready to hang up my gloves and retire from this amazing sport," he said on his official website.

Nearly a year later, however, Hamill decided to come out of retirement. Hamill was expected to face UFC newcomer Roger Hollett on September 22, 2012, at UFC 152. However, Hollett was forced out of the bout due to a contract dispute with Bellator and replaced by Vladimir Matyushenko. However, Matyushenko was forced out of the bout after suffering a torn Achilles tendon while training, and was replaced by Hollett, who had settled the issue in time. He won his return fight via unanimous decision (29–28, 30–27, and 30–27).

Hamill faced Thiago Silva on October 9, 2013, at UFC Fight Night 29. Hamill lost the bout by unanimous decision and was subsequently released from the UFC.

=== World Series of Fighting ===
In May 2014 Hamill signed a deal with World Series of Fighting. He was expected to debut for the promotion later in 2014, however due to nagging injuries, Hamill would retire for the second time in his career.

Hamill later decided to return to mixed martial arts and was scheduled to fight against Vinny Magalhães at WSOF 20 on April 10, 2015. However Magalhães was pulled from the bout after a contract dispute with Titan Fighting Championships. Hamill was expected to fight in a rematch against Thiago Silva at WSOF 19 on March 28, 2015, but was forced to withdraw from the competition after a sinus infection. Hamill eventually faced Magalhães at WSOF 24 held on October 17, 2015. He lost the fight via submission in the first round.

=== Independent promotions ===
After his stint in WSOF, Hamill began fighting for various independent promotions.

Hamill faced Rameau Thierry Sokoudjou on May 21, 2016, at Venator FC3: Palhares vs. Meek in Italy. He lost the fight via knockout in the first round.

Hamill next faced Julian Marquez on October 14, 2016, at Combate Americas: Empire Rising. He lost the fight via TKO in the first round.

Following a four-fight losing streak, Hamill earned his first win in over four years when he faced fellow UFC veteran Luiz Cané at Fight 2 Night 2 on April 28, 2017, in Brazil. He won the fight via knockout in the first round.

Hamill then faced Chris Birchler at Maverick MMA 6 on April 14, 2018, and won by split decision. This would mark his last professional fight to date.

== Other media ==
Hamill is the subject of a 2010 movie entitled The Hammer about his early life and wrestling career. Originally set to star Eben Kostbar, it was criticized by the deaf community for featuring a non-deaf actor; however, Hamill himself supported the casting of Kostbar due to his wrestling experience and the fact that Kostbar is fluent in American Sign Language. However, Kostbar withdrew from starring, feeling it would be more appropriate for a deaf actor to take the role, which was finally given to deaf actor Russell Harvard. The movie was produced by Joseph McKelheer and Eben Kostbar, and was directed by Oren Kaplan.

== Personal life ==
Hamill has a daughter from his first marriage.

On January 4, 2025 it was reported that Hamill got powerful hearing aids and is able to hear for the first time in 41 years.

== Championships and Accomplishments ==
- Ultimate Fighting Championship
  - Knockout of the Night (One time) vs. Mark Muñoz
  - Fight of the Night (Two times) vs. Seth Petruzelli and Keith Jardine
  - UFC.com Awards
    - 2009: Ranked #3 Knockout of the Year vs. Mark Muñoz
- National Wrestling Hall of Fame
  - 2013: https://nwhof.org/hall_of_fame/bio/2934

== Mixed martial arts record ==
Professional record breakdown
21 matches	13 wins	8 losses
By knockout	8	4
By submission	0	1
By decision	4	3
By disqualification	1	0

Res.	Record	Opponent	Method	Event	Date	Round	Time	Location	Notes
Win	13–8	Chris Birchler	Decision (split)	Maverick MMA 6	April 14, 2018	3	5:00	Allentown, Pennsylvania, United States	
Win	12–8	Luiz Cané	KO (punches)	F2N: Fight2Night2	April 28, 2017	1	0:38	Foz do Iguaçu, Brazil	
Loss	11–8	Julian Marquez	TKO (punches)	Combate Americas: Empire Rising	October 14, 2016	1	1:22	Verona, New York, United States	
Loss	11–7	Rameau Thierry Sokoudjou	KO (punches)	Venator FC3: Palhares vs. Meek	May 21, 2016	1	0:37	Milan, Italy	
Loss	11–6	Vinny Magalhães	Submission (kneebar)	WSOF 24	October 17, 2015	1	1:08	Mashantucket, Connecticut, United States	WSOF debut.
Loss	11–5	Thiago Silva	Decision (unanimous)	UFC Fight Night: Maia vs. Shields	October 9, 2013	3	5:00	Barueri, São Paulo, Brazil	
Win	11–4	Roger Hollett	Decision (unanimous)	UFC 152	September 22, 2012	3	5:00	Toronto, Ontario, Canada	
Loss	10–4	Alexander Gustafsson	TKO (punches and elbows)	UFC 133	August 6, 2011	2	3:34	Philadelphia, Pennsylvania, United States	
Loss	10–3	Quinton Jackson	Decision (unanimous)	UFC 130	May 28, 2011	3	5:00	Las Vegas, Nevada, United States	
Win	10–2	Tito Ortiz	Decision (unanimous)	UFC 121	October 23, 2010	3	5:00	Anaheim, California, United States	
Win	9–2	Keith Jardine	Decision (majority)	The Ultimate Fighter 11 Finale	June 19, 2010	3	5:00	Las Vegas, Nevada, United States	Fight of the Night.
Win	8–2	Jon Jones	DQ (illegal elbows)	The Ultimate Fighter 10 Finale	December 5, 2009	1	4:14	Las Vegas, Nevada, United States	
Win	7–2	Mark Muñoz	KO (head kick)	UFC 96	March 7, 2009	1	3:53	Columbus, Ohio, United States	Knockout of the Night.
Win	6–2	Reese Andy	TKO (punches)	UFC 92	December 27, 2008	2	2:19	Las Vegas, Nevada, United States	
Loss	5–2	Rich Franklin	TKO (body kick)	UFC 88	September 6, 2008	3	0:39	Atlanta, Georgia, United States	
Win	5–1	Tim Boetsch	TKO (punches)	UFC Fight Night: Florian vs. Lauzon	April 2, 2008	2	1:25	Broomfield, Colorado, United States	
Loss	4–1	Michael Bisping	Decision (split)	UFC 75	September 8, 2007	3	5:00	London, England	
Win	4–0	Rex Holman	TKO (punches)	UFC 68	March 3, 2007	1	4:00	Columbus, Ohio, United States	
Win	3–0	Seth Petruzelli	Decision (unanimous)	Ortiz vs. Shamrock 3: The Final Chapter	October 10, 2006	3	5:00	Hollywood, Florida, United States	Fight of the Night.
Win	2–0	Jesse Forbes	TKO (punches)	The Ultimate Fighter: Team Ortiz vs. Team Shamrock Finale	June 24, 2006	1	4:47	Las Vegas, Nevada, United States	
Win	1–0	Robert Hitte	TKO (punches)	XFO 7	August 27, 2005	1	1:52	Island Lake, Illinois, United States	

== See also ==
- List of male mixed martial artists
