= Michael Bisping =

English mixed martial artist (born 1979)

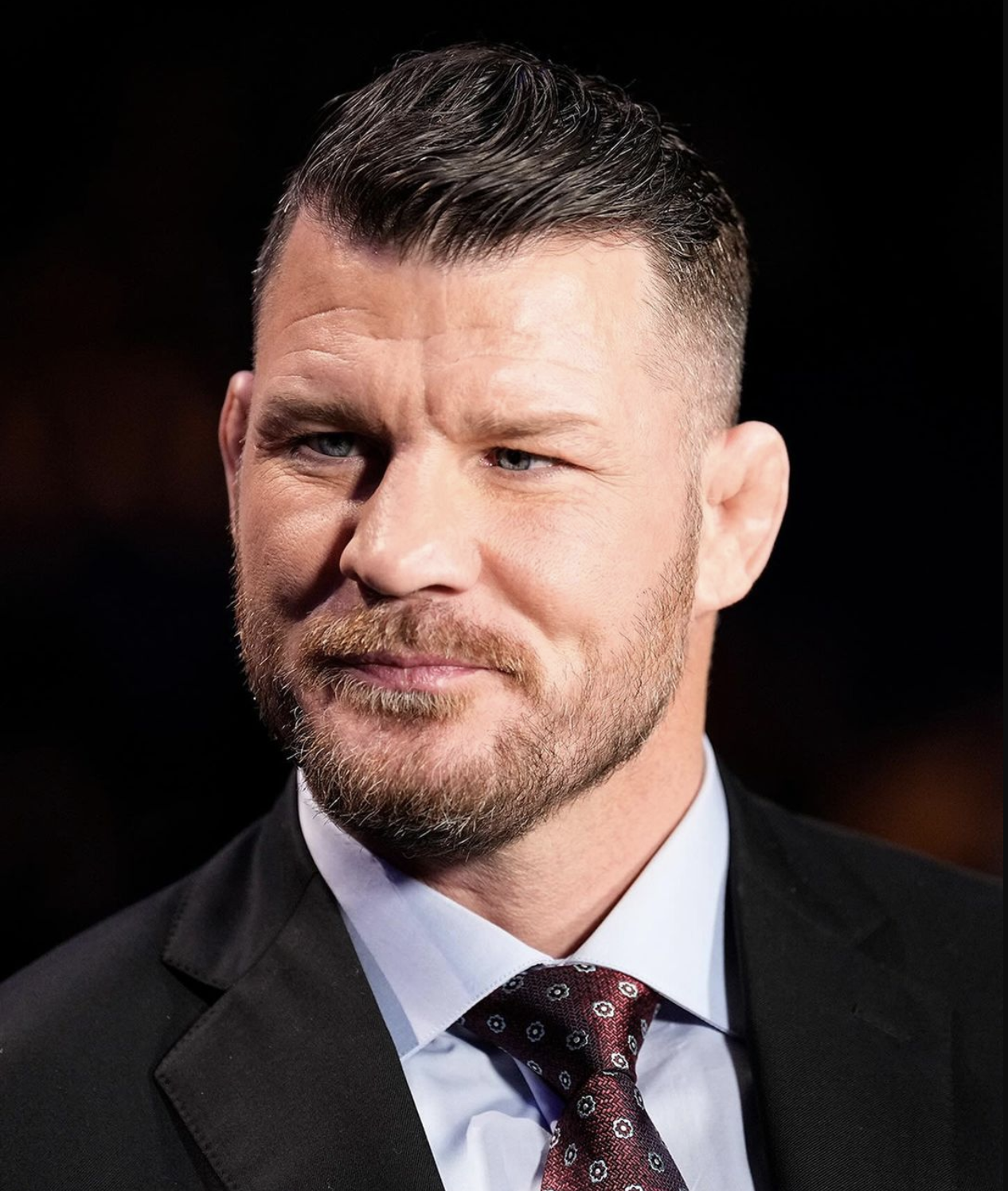
- Bisping in 2022
- Born: Michael Gavin Joseph Bisping; 28 February 1979 (age 47); Nicosia, Cyprus
- Other names: The Count
- Nationality: British
- Height: 6 ft 2 in (188 cm)
- Weight: 185 lb (84 kg; 13 st 3 lb)
- Division: Middleweight (2008–2017) Light Heavyweight (2004–2007)
- Reach: 75 1/2 in (192 cm)
- Fighting out of: Manchester, England
- Team: Reign Training Center; RVCA Training Center
- Rank: Brown belt in Brazilian Jiu-Jitsu under Brady Fink
- Years active: 2004–2017

Mixed martial arts record
- Total: 39
- Wins: 30
- By knockout: 18
- By submission: 2
- By decision: 10
- Losses: 9
- By knockout: 3
- By submission: 2
- By decision: 4

Mixed martial arts exhibition record
- Total: 2
- Wins: 2
- By knockout: 2

Other information
- Website: michaelbispingofficial.com
- Mixed martial arts record from Sherdog

YouTube information
- Channel: Michael Bisping
- Subscribers: 730 thousand
- Views: 155.2 million
- Last updated: 17 January 2026

Michael Gavin Joseph Bisping (/ˈbɪspɪŋ/; born 28 February 1979) is an English sports commentator, analyst, actor, and former mixed martial artist. He competed in the middleweight and light heavyweight divisions of the Ultimate Fighting Championship (UFC). A professional competitor from 2004 to 2017, he held the UFC middleweight title, the Cage Rage light heavyweight title, and won the light heavyweight tournament of The Ultimate Fighter 3.

At UFC 78, Bisping became the first British fighter to compete in a UFC main event. In 2013, he became legally blind in his right eye after fighting Vitor Belfort, in which a fight-ending head kick had left Bisping with a detached retina. Three years later, Bisping won the UFC middleweight title by knocking out Luke Rockhold at UFC 199, becoming the first British fighter to win a UFC Championship. He defended his title against Dan Henderson at UFC 204, but lost it to Georges St-Pierre the following year at UFC 217. After his knockout loss to Kelvin Gastelum three weeks later, Bisping retired from the sport. He was inducted into the UFC Hall of Fame on 5 July 2019.

Bisping has also embarked on an acting career, starring in films such as XXX: Return of Xander Cage (2017), Triple Threat (2019), and Red Sonja. He also portrayed Roy Shaw in the British sports drama film My Name Is Lenny (2017). On television, he has appeared in series such as Strike Back, Twin Peaks, MacGyver, Magnum P.I. and Warrior.

== Early life ==
Bisping was born on a British military base in Nicosia, Cyprus. He is one of five children born to Jan Konrad Bisping and Kathleen (née Armitage) Bisping and grew up in Clitheroe, Lancashire. He attended St Augustine's Roman Catholic High School, Billington.

Michael's Polish paternal grandfather, Andrew (Andrzej Bobola Bisping von Gallen), was born in what is now Masaliany, Byerastavitsa Rayon, Hrodna Voblasts, Belarus, descended from German nobility who moved to Poland in the Middle Ages and was a member of the noble Polish Zamoyski family (through his mother), while Michael's English paternal grandmother, Mary Greenwood, was from Clitheroe.

Andrzej Bobola Bisping von Gallen fled with his family from Poland to England after the Soviet invasion in September 1939. Many members of the noble families were pursued and executed by Soviet Red Army during World War II, including Andrew's father, Jan, who was named after his own grandfather (Andrew's father), served in the British Army. Michael's mother is from Northern Ireland. Bisping has described himself as "English through and through". He began training jujutsu at the age of eight. In 1994, at the age of 15, he competed as an amateur in Britain's first "no holds barred" competition, a precursor to modern MMA, called Knock Down Sport Budo (KSBO). Growing up, Bisping was inspired by Belgian martial artist and actor Jean-Claude Van Damme, who he credits as a major inspiration for sparking his interest in martial arts.

At the age of 18, Bisping decided to abandon his martial arts training "to pursue real-life". Less than a year later, Bisping began training in boxing, kickboxing, and karate on the advice of Allan Clarkin, owner of Black Knights Kickboxing, who saw potential in him. Bisping enjoyed a short but successful kickboxing career, winning the North West Area title and later the Pro British light heavyweight kickboxing title.

After again briefly quitting competition in 1998, Bisping returned to kickboxing to take the Pro British light heavyweight title for a second time. Soon after winning his second kickboxing title, he was forced to abandon his full-time training for a "real job". In addition to working at factories, slaughterhouses, and demolition companies, he was also an upholsterer, postman, tiler, plasterer, and salesman. In 2001, Bisping served a 28-day sentence in HM Prison Preston after pleading guilty to a public order offence following a pub brawl.

== Mixed martial arts career ==
=== Early career ===
Bisping made his professional mixed martial arts debut at Pride & Glory 2: Battle of the Ages on 4 April 2004, taking a 0:38 submission victory over Steve Mathews. Just one month later, Bisping scored his first knockout against John Weir at UK MMA Challenge 7: Rage & Fury. In his third MMA match, Bisping was scheduled to face the experienced Renato Sobral at Cage Rage 7 but his opponent pulled out ten days before the event. Instead, Bisping defeated Mark Epstein by technical knockout and became the Cage Rage light heavyweight champion. Bisping went on to defend his championship title in a rematch against Epstein at Cage Rage 9 in a knockout victory that solidified Bisping as one of the top light heavyweight fighters in England. It also earned him the moniker "The Great British Hope", by UFC.com.

At The Ultimate Fight Club UK: Natural Instinct on 29 January 2005, Bisping made his cage kickboxing debut against David Brown in a light heavyweight contest. With Brown badly cut, Bisping picked up the win via doctor stoppage in round 2.

Bisping made his debut for the promotion at Ultimate Force on 30 April 2005, defeating Dave Radford to win the vacant Cage Warriors light heavyweight title. Bisping then competed in another light heavyweight cage kickboxing contest, against Cyrille Diabaté at CWFC: Strike Force 1 on 21 May 2005, losing via decision after the end of the first extra round. He captured the FX3 light-heavyweight title on 18 June 2005 and, for a time, reigned over the UK's major federations. In his first Cage Warriors title defense, Bisping defeated Miika Mehmet at CWFC: Strike Force 2, on 16 July 2005.

In September 2005, Cage Rage stripped the light heavyweight title from Bisping due to "management issues", though Cage Warriors stated that "Bisping was willing to defend his title but is being punished by Cage Rage due to his Wolfslair and Cage Warriors links". Towards the end of 2005, Bisping again successfully defended the Cage Warriors title, this time against Jakob Lovstad and Ross Pointon in the CWFC: Strike Force series of events, leading to a record of 10 wins and no losses.

=== The Ultimate Fighter 3 ===
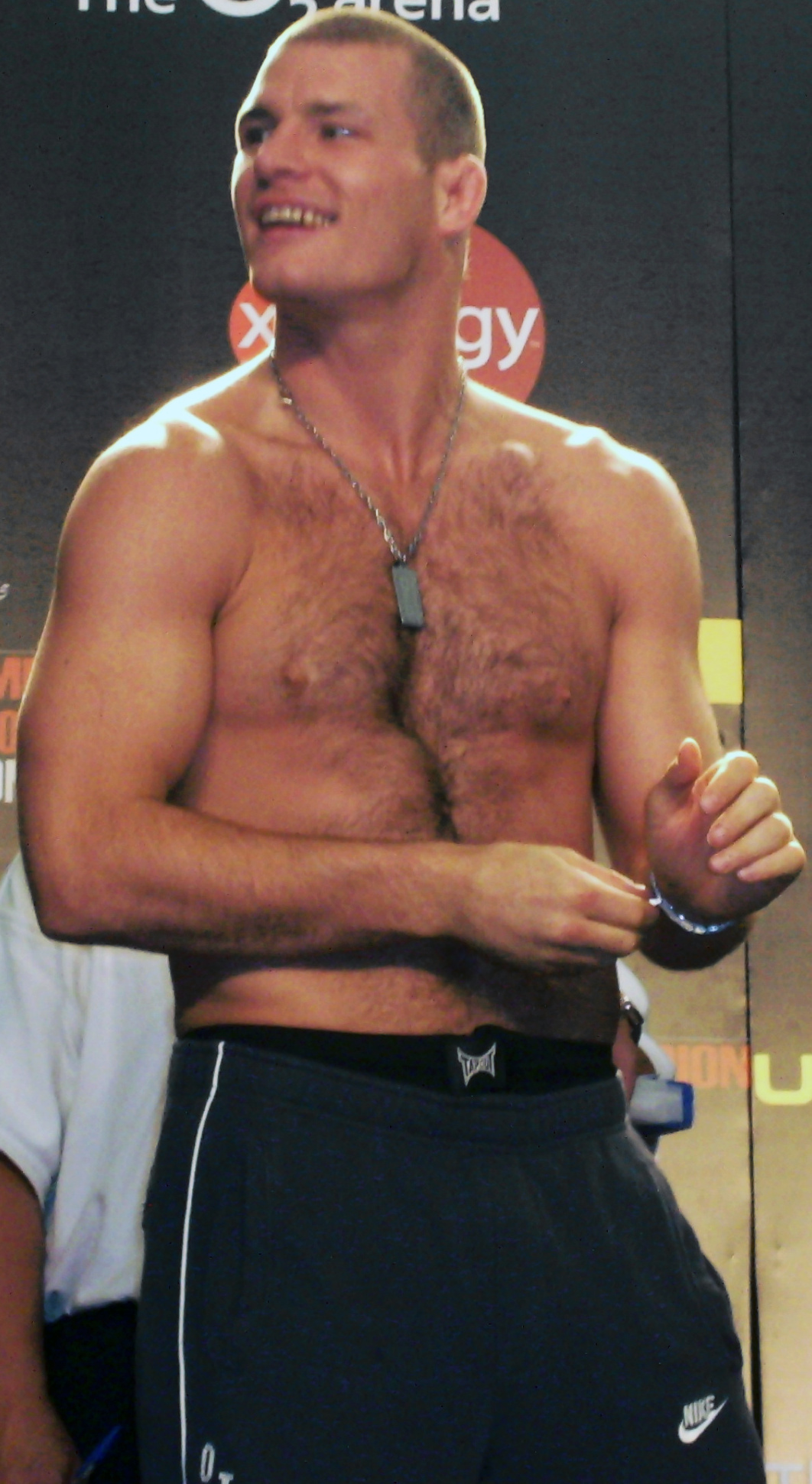
Bisping in 2007

In early 2006, Bisping was featured on the UFC's The Ultimate Fighter 3 reality television series as a contestant training under Tito Ortiz. He won a preliminary bout against Kristian Rothaermel by TKO, followed by a semi-final win against Ross Pointon by submission after landing a flying knee and a series of strikes. In the finals, Bisping finished Josh Haynes by TKO at 4:14 into the second round, making Bisping the second Light Heavyweight winner of The Ultimate Fighter television series.

=== Ultimate Fighting Championship ===
Five months after his victory in the TUF 3 finals, Bisping was slated to fight Eric Schafer at The Ultimate Fighter 4 finale, but withdrew because of problems acquiring his visa. The fight was rescheduled and held on 30 December at UFC 66. Bisping defeated Schafer by TKO at 4:24 in the first round.

On 21 April 2007, Bisping scored a TKO win over Elvis Sinosic at UFC 70 in Manchester, England.

Bisping was a special guest referee at the Cage Warriors events Enter The Wolfslair on 5 March 2005 and CWFC: Strike Force 6 on 27 May 2006.

On 8 September 2007, Bisping faced former Ultimate Fighter 3 rival Matt Hamill in London, England. Bisping won the fight by split decision. The decision was controversial with many believing Hamill won the fight.

Bisping's next match at UFC 78 against fellow Ultimate Fighter winner Rashad Evans resulted in his first loss, via a split decision.

==== Move down to middleweight ====
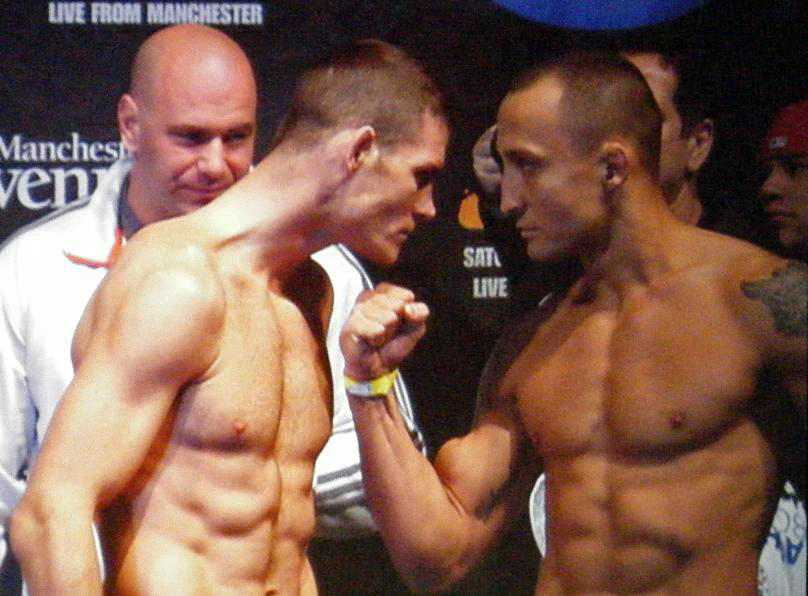
Bisping (left) and Denis Kang at the weigh-ins for UFC 105

Since the start of his MMA career, people had been advising that Bisping was undersized for the light heavyweight division and would do better at middleweight. With the support of UFC president Dana White, Bisping decided to drop down a weight division, following his loss to Evans. On 19 April 2008 at UFC 83, Bisping made his middleweight debut against Charles McCarthy. Bisping won by TKO, as McCarthy was unable to continue after the first round due to a forearm injury he sustained after receiving an unanswered series of knees and uppercuts from Bisping.

Bisping's next fight was scheduled to be on 7 June 2008 at UFC 85 in London, against Chris Leben. However, after Leben was sentenced to jail for 35 days and unable to compete, Jason Day stepped in. Bisping won the fight in dominant fashion by first round TKO; it was his second 1st round TKO in a row.

Bisping instead fought Leben in the headliner of UFC 89 on 18 October 2008 and won by unanimous decision. After the fight, Leben tested positive for Stanozolol and was suspended for nine months.

Bisping was confirmed as one of the coaches on the ninth season of The Ultimate Fighter. The other coach was the former PRIDE 205lb & 185lb Champion Dan Henderson. After the show's conclusion, Bisping fought Henderson at UFC 100 on 11 July 2009 at Mandalay Bay. The fight was believed to be an eliminator for the UFC Middleweight Championship top contender spot. Bisping was knocked out by Henderson with an overhand right while he was circling to his left. Henderson followed up with a strike after Bisping had fallen to the ground before the fight was stopped. It was Bisping's first knockout loss. Bisping could not remember the fight after the knockout, thinking that the fight was scheduled to take place two months later.

I fought Dan Henderson in 2009 and I lost and that was at UFC 100. UFC 100 was the biggest pay-per-view the company's ever done. 1.6 million pay-per-view buys, watched all over the world, and of course, I get knocked out cold after talking lots of smack leading up to the fight. So I got my just desserts [sic] in that one. After the fight, I don't remember anything. I remember being in the showers and I didn't have a clue what was going on. I was saying to my manager at the time, 'I can't be knocked out cause I'm not fighting for another two months, what the hell are you talking about?' and then these people come and go 'Michael we need to take you to the hospital. I'm like I'm not going to the hospital and then I'd say again, 'what's going on', I'd just keep repeating myself.

Bisping faced Spirit MC and PRIDE veteran Denis Kang at UFC 105 on 14 November 2009. Bisping won by second round TKO. The fight was awarded Fight of the Night, giving both Kang and Bisping a $40,000 bonus.

Bisping next faced former PRIDE Middleweight Champion Wanderlei Silva at UFC 110 on 21 February 2010. Silva won via unanimous decision.

Bisping defeated Dan Miller by unanimous decision on 29 May 2010 at UFC 114.

Bisping faced and defeated Yoshihiro Akiyama on 16 October 2010 at UFC 120, winning 30–27 on all three judges' scorecards. Though Bisping was rocked early in the fight by Akiyama, he regained his composure and landed combinations repeatedly on Akiyama to sweep all three judges scorecards. The fight was awarded Fight of the Night award.

Bisping faced off in an emotionally charged fight against Jorge Rivera on 26 February 2011 at UFC 127. Both fighters had trash-talked each other before the fight and were restrained at the weigh-in during a verbal argument. Bisping dominated the first round scoring a few takedowns until he delivered an illegal knee to the head of Rivera. A point was taken from Bisping and, after a lengthy halt to the action, the fight continued. The fight ended with a TKO from Bisping in the second round. Bisping spat at Rivera's cornerman after the fight and angrily confronted Rivera about pre-fight comments that Bisping thought disparaged his family. Rivera denied the comments and attempted to make amends but Bisping told him to "go home" and called him a "loser." He immediately apologized in the post-match interview. In the aftermath of the incident Bisping faced "disciplinary actions" and was fined his win bonus. Multiple fighters subsequently came forward and said that they wanted to fight Bisping in light of the incident, including UFC middleweight notables such as Chael Sonnen, Vitor Belfort, Demian Maia, Alan Belcher and Nate Marquardt.

On 27 May 2011, it was revealed that Bisping would be one of the coaches of The Ultimate Fighter 14 opposite Jason Miller. There were concerns that Miller had spies in Bisping's training camp, but Bisping was confident that was not true. Bisping defeated Miller via third round TKO on 3 December 2011 at The Ultimate Fighter 14 finale.

Bisping was expected to face Demian Maia on 28 January 2012 at UFC on Fox 2. However, an injury forced Mark Muñoz out of his bout on the same card with Chael Sonnen and Bisping instead fought Sonnen for a chance to challenge Anderson Silva for the Middleweight title. Sonnen defeated Bisping via unanimous decision.

Bisping was expected to face Tim Boetsch on 21 July 2012 at UFC 149. However, Bisping was forced out of the bout with an injury and replaced by promotional newcomer Hector Lombard.

Bisping faced Brian Stann on 22 September 2012 at UFC 152. Bisping won the fight via unanimous decision.

Bisping faced former UFC Light Heavyweight Champion Vitor Belfort on 19 January 2013 at UFC on FX: Belfort vs. Bisping in a fight which would have given Bisping a title shot had he won. However, he lost the fight via second-round TKO after getting hit flush by a head kick. According to Bisping, this kick caused the retinal detachment of his right eye. Fear of not being able to compete again prevented him from seeing a doctor.

Bisping went on to face Alan Belcher on 27 April 2013 at UFC 159. In the first round Bisping managed to out-box his opponent and score a brief trip takedown, in addition to landing a solid knee. Bisping then stepped up the pace of the fight in round 2, landing some heavy kicks and multiple combinations of punches. The fight was stopped at 4:29 of round 3 as Bisping inadvertently poked Belcher in the eye, rendering Belcher unable to continue. Bisping won the bout via unanimous technical decision.

Bisping was expected to face Mark Muñoz on 26 October 2013 at UFC Fight Night 30. However, after symptoms of his detached retina became too bad he decided to undergo surgery. He pulled out of the bout on 27 September and was replaced by Lyoto Machida.

After nearly a year away from the sport due to his eye injury, Bisping returned to face Tim Kennedy on 16 April 2014 at The Ultimate Fighter Nations Finale. He lost the fight via unanimous decision.

In April 2014, it was reported that both Bisping and Brad Tavares were interested in a potential fight. However, in May 2014, it was announced that Bisping would face Cung Le on 23 August 2014 at UFC Fight Night 48. Bisping won the one-sided fight via TKO in the fourth round. The win also earned Bisping his first Performance of the Night bonus award.

Bisping faced Luke Rockhold on 8 November 2014 at UFC Fight Night 55. He lost the fight in the second round after being dropped by a head kick and then submitted with a guillotine choke.

Bisping faced C.B. Dollaway on 25 April 2015 at UFC 186. Bisping won the fight by unanimous decision.

Bisping faced Thales Leites on 18 July 2015 at UFC Fight Night 72. He won the back-and-forth fight by split decision.

Bisping was expected to face Robert Whittaker on 15 November 2015 at UFC 193. However, it was announced on 30 September 2015 that Bisping had withdrawn from the bout, citing an elbow injury, and been replaced by Uriah Hall.

Bisping was briefly linked to a fight with Gegard Mousasi on 27 February 2016 at UFC Fight Night 84. However, on 24 December, Bisping was pulled from the bout in favour of a match-up with Anderson Silva at the same event. Bisping won the fight via unanimous decision. Both participants were awarded Fight of the Night honours.

==== UFC Middleweight Champion ====
With an injury to Chris Weidman forcing him to pull out of the fight, Bisping stepped up on only 17 days' notice to face champion Luke Rockhold for a second time on 4 June 2016 at UFC 199. He won via knockout in the first round to become the UFC Middleweight Champion and the first British UFC champion. He was awarded Performance of the Night honours. The result was considered by many MMA media outlets to be one of the biggest upsets in the UFC title fight history, as Bisping took the fight on short notice and had been submitted in their first encounter 18 months earlier.

Bisping faced Dan Henderson in a rematch on 8 October 2016 at UFC 204. Bisping won the fight via unanimous decision and retained the UFC Middleweight Championship. Both fighters were awarded Fight of the Night for their performance.

On 1 March 2017 while on SportsCenter, Dana White announced that Bisping's next title defense would be against the returning former UFC Welterweight Champion Georges St-Pierre sometime in 2017. However, on 11 May 2017, White announced the fight had been cancelled. The UFC and Bisping had wanted to have the fight at UFC 213, as part of International Fight Week in Las Vegas, but St-Pierre announced on his Instagram page that he needed more training to meet the 185-pound weight and would not be ready to fight until November. The pairing eventually took place on 4 November 2017 in the main event at UFC 217. Bisping lost the bout via technical submission due to a rear-naked choke in the third round.

==== Post-UFC championship and retirement ====
Three weeks after losing the Middleweight title, on 25 November 2017 at UFC Fight Night: Bisping vs. Gastelum, Bisping faced Kelvin Gastelum as a replacement for Anderson Silva, who had been suspended by USADA due to failing a drug test. He lost the fight via knockout in the first round.

On 28 May 2018, Bisping officially announced his retirement from MMA competition. In late December 2018, Bisping appeared on The Joe Rogan Experience, elaborating on his retirement from MMA, which he said was due to eye injury suffered in the fight with Kelvin Gastelum.

I started having issues with my good eye as well after the Gastelum fight. I was like, this isn't worth it. The reason I retired was the Gastelum fight.

On 16 March 2019, it was announced at UFC Fight Night: Till vs. Masvidal that Bisping would be inducted in the UFC Hall of Fame under the modern era wing.

On 1 November 2019, he released his book Quitters Never Win: My Life in UFC.

Bisping and former UFC Heavyweight and UFC Light Heavyweight champion Daniel Cormier are scheduled to serve as coaches for The Ultimate Fighter: Season 34 which will air in June 2026.

== Acting career ==
On 6 April 2016, Bisping announced that he had landed a role in the film XXX: Return of Xander Cage. Later that month, Bisping revealed that he is a fan of the 1990s television series Twin Peaks and that he had gained a small role in the 2017 continuation of the series. He portrayed Roy Shaw in the sports drama film My Name Is Lenny. Bisping also had a short cameo at the end of the 2018 film Den of Thieves. He reprised his role in a larger capacity for the sequel Den of Thieves 2: Pantera.

In 2018, Bisping was announced as one of the four presenters of the reality competition series Hyperdrive, which would be released on Netflix on 21 August 2019.

In November 2020, it was announced that Bisping would be playing the main role in a boxing movie titled The Journeyman, based on Mark Turley's book. That same month, Bisping appeared as a tournament fighter, Dolph, in the HBO Max series Warrior.

== Personal life ==
Bisping met his Australian wife, Rebecca, in Manchester. The couple have three children and reside in Orange County, California. Their eldest son Callum is an accomplished wrestler, a CIF champion as a high schooler who currently competes in NCAA Division II out of San Francisco State University. Their third child was born just before Bisping set off to the USA for final preparation in his fight against Dan Miller.

Bisping suffers from strabismus, which is a condition in which the eyes are not properly aligned when looking at an object. This was caused by a detached retina injury from the fight with Vitor Belfort at UFC on FX: Belfort vs. Bisping in 2013, which Bisping lost via technical knockout in round two. The loss was considered controversial, as at that time Belfort was on testosterone replacement therapy. Bisping stated his satisfaction after Belfort lost via a knockout from a front kick by Lyoto Machida on 12 May 2018 at UFC 224, in his retirement fight.

It's very satisfying to see him [Vitor Belfort] lose if I'm honest. I don't care for the guy. I think he's built a career off being a cheat. The amount of insane steroids over his life, over his career, is evident to see. I mean you go back and look at his early career, the guy was insanely jacked. When we fought he was insanely jacked, and now you look at him and he looks like a f*cking beat up old man. And he's getting knocked out like so and performing like so.

Bisping later lost all vision in his right eye, and wore an unsatisfactory cosmetic lens for some time before learning of an optician near his home who was able to manufacture a latex cosmetic which perfectly matched his real eye; he wears these to this day, calling it "the best three thousand dollars I ever spent in my life."

Bisping's moniker, "The Count", was given by a ring announcer during a fight.

My old manager told the ring announcer to introduce me as The Count. I said no at first, but I'm actually a Count in Poland (grandfather was a Polish Count). It embarrasses me a little bit. I made the mistake of telling someone at school and I was subsequently made fun of.

Bisping made his UFC colour commentary debut on 2 February 2019 at UFC Fight Night 144 in Fortaleza, Brazil, after several appearances in the Dana White‘s Tuesday Night Contender Series commentary team in 2018. He then made his UFC pay-per-view commentary debut on 12 July 2020 at UFC 251 in Abu Dhabi, UAE. In 2023 he started commentating for Power Slap.

Bisping is a Manchester United fan. He has a YouTube channel. In 2025, Bisping became a brand ambassador as part of a multi-year branding deal between the UFC and Spribe.

== Championships and accomplishments ==
- Ultimate Fighting Championship
  - UFC Hall of Fame (Modern wing, Class of 2019)
  - UFC Middleweight Championship (one time)
    - One successful title defence vs. Dan Henderson
    - First British champion in UFC history
  - The Ultimate Fighter 3 Light Heavyweight Tournament Winner
  - Fight of the Night (Five times) vs. Elvis Sinosic, Denis Kang, Yoshihiro Akiyama, Anderson Silva and Dan Henderson 1
  - Performance of the Night (Two times) vs. Cung Le and Luke Rockhold 2
  - UFC Encyclopedia Awards
    - Knockout of the Night (One time) vs. Josh Haynes
  - Most wins in UFC Middleweight division history (16)
  - Third most bouts in UFC Middleweight division history (24) (behind Brad Tavares)
  - Second most total fight time in UFC Middleweight division history (5:15:15) (behind Brad Tavares)
  - Second most significant strikes landed in UFC Middleweight division history (1384) (behind Sean Strickland)
    - Fourth most total strikes landed in UFC Middleweight division history (1654)
  - Tied (Robert Whittaker) for third most decision wins in UFC Middleweight division history (9)
  - Retired with most fights in UFC history (29); since surpassed by Jim Miller
  - UFC.com Awards
    - 2008: Ranked #10 Fighter of the Year
    - 2009: Ranked #10 Upset of the Year vs. Denis Kang
    - 2016: Fighter of the Year, Ranked #7 Knockout of the Year & Upset of the Year vs. Luke Rockhold 2
    - 2017: Ranked #9 Fight of the Year vs. Georges St-Pierre
- Cage Rage Championships
  - Cage Rage Light Heavyweight Championship (one time)
    - One successful title defence
- Cage Warriors Fighting Championship
  - CWFC Light Heavyweight Championship (one time)
    - Three successful title defences
- FX3
  - FX3 Light Heavyweight Championship (one time)
- The Athletic
  - 2010s Middleweight Fighter of the Decade
- World MMA Awards
  - 2008 International Fighter of the Year
  - 2012 International Fighter of the Year
  - 2016 Upset of the Year vs. Luke Rockhold at UFC 199
  - 2021 Analyst of the Year
  - 2022 Analyst of the Year
  - 2023 Analyst of the Year
  - 2024 Analyst of the Year
- ESPN
  - 2016 Fighter of the Year
- Combat Press
  - 2016 Male Fighter of the Year
  - 2016 Upset of the Year vs. Luke Rockhold at UFC 199
- Bloody Elbow
  - 2016 Fighter of the Year
  - 2016 Upset of the Year vs. Luke Rockhold at UFC 199
- MMADNA.nl
  - 2016 Upset of the Year vs. Luke Rockhold at UFC 199
- CBS Sports
  - 2016 #4 Ranked UFC Fighter of the Year
  - 2016 #8 Ranked UFC Fight of the Year vs. Dan Henderson at UFC 204
- MMA Junkie
  - 2016 #4 Ranked Fighter of the Year

== Mixed martial arts record ==
Professional record breakdown
39 matches	30 wins	9 losses
By knockout	18	3
By submission	2	2
By decision	10	4

Res.	Record	Opponent	Method	Event	Date	Round	Time	Location	Notes
Loss	30–9	Kelvin Gastelum	KO (punch)	UFC Fight Night: Bisping vs. Gastelum	25 November 2017	1	2:30	Shanghai, China	
Loss	30–8	Georges St-Pierre	Technical Submission (rear-naked choke)	UFC 217	4 November 2017	3	4:23	New York City, New York, United States	Lost the UFC Middleweight Championship.
Win	30–7	Dan Henderson	Decision (unanimous)	UFC 204	8 October 2016	5	5:00	Manchester, England	Defended the UFC Middleweight Championship. Fight of the Night.
Win	29–7	Luke Rockhold	KO (punches)	UFC 199	4 June 2016	1	3:36	Inglewood, California, United States	Won the UFC Middleweight Championship. Performance of the Night.
Win	28–7	Anderson Silva	Decision (unanimous)	UFC Fight Night: Silva vs. Bisping	27 February 2016	5	5:00	London, England	Fight of the Night.
Win	27–7	Thales Leites	Decision (split)	UFC Fight Night: Bisping vs. Leites	18 July 2015	5	5:00	Glasgow, Scotland	
Win	26–7	C. B. Dollaway	Decision (unanimous)	UFC 186	25 April 2015	3	5:00	Montreal, Quebec, Canada	
Loss	25–7	Luke Rockhold	Submission (guillotine choke)	UFC Fight Night: Rockhold vs. Bisping	8 November 2014	2	0:57	Sydney, Australia	
Win	25–6	Cung Le	TKO (knee and punches)	UFC Fight Night: Bisping vs. Le	23 August 2014	4	0:57	Macau, SAR, China	Performance of the Night.
Loss	24–6	Tim Kennedy	Decision (unanimous)	The Ultimate Fighter Nations Finale: Bisping vs. Kennedy	16 April 2014	5	5:00	Quebec City, Quebec, Canada	
Win	24–5	Alan Belcher	Technical Decision (unanimous)	UFC 159	27 April 2013	3	4:31	Newark, New Jersey, United States	An inadvertent eye poke rendered Belcher unable to continue any further.
Loss	23–5	Vitor Belfort	TKO (head kick and punches)	UFC on FX: Belfort vs. Bisping	19 January 2013	2	1:27	São Paulo, Brazil	
Win	23–4	Brian Stann	Decision (unanimous)	UFC 152	22 September 2012	3	5:00	Toronto, Ontario, Canada	
Loss	22–4	Chael Sonnen	Decision (unanimous)	UFC on Fox: Evans vs. Davis	28 January 2012	3	5:00	Chicago, Illinois, United States	UFC Middleweight title eliminator.
Win	22–3	Jason Miller	TKO (knees to the body and punches)	The Ultimate Fighter: Team Bisping vs. Team Miller Finale	3 December 2011	3	3:34	Las Vegas, Nevada, United States	
Win	21–3	Jorge Rivera	TKO (punches)	UFC 127	27 February 2011	2	1:54	Sydney, Australia	Bisping was deducted one point in round 1 after landing an illegal knee.
Win	20–3	Yoshihiro Akiyama	Decision (unanimous)	UFC 120	16 October 2010	3	5:00	London, England	Fight of the Night.
Win	19–3	Dan Miller	Decision (unanimous)	UFC 114	29 May 2010	3	5:00	Las Vegas, Nevada, United States	
Loss	18–3	Wanderlei Silva	Decision (unanimous)	UFC 110	20 February 2010	3	5:00	Sydney, Australia	
Win	18–2	Denis Kang	TKO (punches)	UFC 105	14 November 2009	2	4:24	Manchester, England	Fight of the Night.
Loss	17–2	Dan Henderson	KO (punch)	UFC 100	11 July 2009	2	3:20	Las Vegas, Nevada, United States	UFC Middleweight title eliminator.
Win	17–1	Chris Leben	Decision (unanimous)	UFC 89	18 October 2008	3	5:00	Birmingham, England	Leben tested positive for Stanozolol.
Win	16–1	Jason Day	TKO (punches)	UFC 85	7 June 2008	1	3:42	London, England	
Win	15–1	Charles McCarthy	TKO (arm injury)	UFC 83	19 April 2008	1	5:00	Montreal, Quebec, Canada	Middleweight debut.
Loss	14–1	Rashad Evans	Decision (split)	UFC 78	17 November 2007	3	5:00	Newark, New Jersey, United States	
Win	14–0	Matt Hamill	Decision (split)	UFC 75	8 September 2007	3	5:00	London, England	
Win	13–0	Elvis Sinosic	TKO (punches)	UFC 70	21 April 2007	2	1:40	Manchester, England	Fight of the Night.
Win	12–0	Eric Schafer	TKO (punches)	UFC 66	30 December 2006	1	4:24	Las Vegas, Nevada United States	
Win	11–0	Josh Haynes	TKO (punches)	The Ultimate Fighter: Team Ortiz vs. Team Shamrock Finale	24 June 2006	2	4:14	Las Vegas, Nevada, United States	Won The Ultimate Fighter 3 Light Heavyweight Tournament.
Win	10–0	Ross Pointon	Submission (armbar)	CWFC: Strike Force 4	26 November 2005	1	2:00	Coventry, England	Defended the Cage Warriors Light Heavyweight Championship.
Win	9–0	Jakob Lovstad	TKO (submission to punches)	CWFC: Strike Force 3	1 October 2005	1	1:10	Coventry, England	Defended the Cage Warriors Light Heavyweight Championship.
Win	8–0	Miika Mehmet	TKO (corner stoppage)	CWFC: Strike Force 2	16 July 2005	1	3:01	Coventry, England	Defended the Cage Warriors Light Heavyweight Championship.
Win	7–0	Alex Cook	Submission (choke)	FX3: Xplosion	18 June 2005	1	3:21	Reading, England	Won the FX3 Light Heavyweight Championship.
Win	6–0	Dave Radford	TKO (punches)	CWFC: Ultimate Force	30 April 2005	1	2:46	Sheffield, England	Won the inaugural Cage Warriors Light Heavyweight Championship.
Win	5–0	Mark Epstein	KO (punch)	Cage Rage 9	27 November 2004	3	4:43	London, England	Defended the Cage Rage Light Heavyweight Championship.
Win	4–0	Andy Bridges	KO	Pride & Glory 3: Glory Days	7 August 2004	1	0:45	Newcastle upon Tyne, England	
Win	3–0	Mark Epstein	TKO (punches and knees)	Cage Rage 7	10 July 2004	2	1:27	London, England	Won the Cage Rage Light Heavyweight Championship.
Win	2–0	John Weir	TKO (punches)	UK MMA Championship 7: Rage & Fury	30 May 2004	1	0:50	Manchester, England	
Win	1–0	Steve Mathews	TKO (strikes)	Pride & Glory 2: Battle of the Ages	10 April 2004	1	0:38	Newcastle upon Tyne, England	

=== Mixed martial arts exhibition record ===
Res.	Record	Opponent	Method	Event	Date	Round	Time	Location	Notes
Win	2–0	Ross Pointon	TKO (submission to punches)	The Ultimate Fighter: Team Ortiz vs. Team Shamrock	15 June 2006 (Air date)	1	2:13	(United States) Las Vegas, Nevada	The Ultimate Fighter 3 Semi Final bout.
Win	1–0	Kristian Rothaermel	TKO (punches)	The Ultimate Fighter: Team Ortiz vs. Team Shamrock	27 April 2006 (Air date)	1	3:51	(United States) Las Vegas, Nevada	The Ultimate Fighter 3 Quarter Final bout.

== Submission grappling record ==
1 Match, 0 Wins, 0 Losses, 1 Draw
Result	Rec.	Opponent	Method	Event	Date	Division	Location
Draw	0–0–1	(United States) Chael Sonnen	Draw	UR Fight 2016	20 March 2016	Superfight	(United States) Phoenix, Arizona

== Pay-per-view bouts ==
No.	Event	Fight	Date	Venue	City	PPV Buys
1.	UFC 78	Evans vs. Bisping	17 November 2007	Prudential Center	Newark, New Jersey, U.S.	400,000
2.	UFC 199	Rockhold vs. Bisping 2	4 June 2016	The Forum	Inglewood, California U.S.	320,000
3.	UFC 204	Bisping vs. Henderson 2	8 October 2016	Manchester Arena	Manchester, England	290,000
4.	UFC 217	Bisping vs. St-Pierre	4 November 2017	Madison Square Garden	New York City, New York, U.S.	875,000
Total sales						1,885,000

== Filmography ==
=== Film ===
Year	Title	Role	Notes
2010	Beatdown	Drake Colby	
2014	Plastic	Kasper	
2014	The Anomaly	Sergio	
2017	XXX: Return of Xander Cage	Hawk	
2017	My Name Is Lenny	Roy Shaw	
2018	Den of Thieves	Connor	Cameo
2019	Triple Threat	Joey	
2021	Bisping	Himself	Documentary
2021	Never Back Down: Revolt	Janek	
2024	Fight Another Day	Arthur Dane	
2025	Den of Thieves 2: Pantera	Connor	
2025	The Naked Gun	Chet	
2025	Red Sonja	Hawk	

=== Television ===
Year	Title	Role	Notes
2010	Hollyoaks Later	Nathan McAllister	Season 3; 5 episodes
2015	Strike Back	Aaron	Episode: "Legacy: Part 1"
2017	Twin Peaks	Guard	Episode: "Part 1"
2017	Dark Matter	Goren	Episode: "Give It Up, Princess"
2018	MacGyver	Porter	Episode: "UFO + Area 51"
2019	Magnum P.I.	Jason Coburn	Episode: "The Day It All Came Together"
2019	Hyperdrive	Presenter	10 episodes
2020	Warrior	Dolph Jagger	Episode: "To a Man with a Hammer, Everything Looks Like a Nail"
2021–present	UFC Fight Week	Himself	

== See also ==
- List of current UFC fighters
- List of male mixed martial artists

== Books ==
- Bisping, Michael (22 August 2019). Quitters Never Win: My Life in UFC. Ebury Press. ISBN 978-1529104448.

Achievements
Preceded by Luke Rockhold	8th UFC Middleweight Champion; 4 June 2016 – 4 November 2017	Succeeded by Georges St-Pierre
