= The Ultimate Fighter 3 =

UFC mixed martial arts television series and event in 2006

- Season 3
- Starring: Dana White, Tito Ortiz, and Ken Shamrock

Release
- Original network: Spike TV
- Original release: April 6 – June 24, 2006

Season chronology
- ← Previous; The Ultimate Fighter 2 Next → The Ultimate Fighter 4

The Ultimate Fighter 3 was the third season of the mixed martial arts reality television series The Ultimate Fighter. It premiered on April 6, 2006, immediately after the conclusion of Ultimate Fight Night 4. The season featured sixteen fighters (eight light heavyweights and eight middleweights) with still-feuding former champion Tito Ortiz and Ken Shamrock as coaches. The finale aired on June 24, 2006 and tied the UFC's all-time record with a 2.0 overall rating.

There were several rule changes from the previous Ultimate Fighter seasons. There were to be no team challenges. All fighters would have to win a preliminary match before advancing to the semi-finals—which in practice started the single-elimination tournament at the beginning of the series instead of near the end. The first preliminary match was set by the team who won a coin toss. All subsequent first-round match-ups were set by the team that won the previous match. Each fight was set for two rounds instead of the normal three. If there was a draw after two rounds, the match would go to a final, five-minute tiebreaker round. In such a case, the judges' final decision on the match would be based solely on the third round (unless the fight was stopped by the referee before the end of the round). Coaches were allowed to bring two other assistant coaches to assist with training, whereas in previous seasons, assistant trainers hired by the UFC worked for both camps.

This series of The Ultimate Fighter was also the first in which fighters who reside outside North America had participated (Michael Bisping, Clitheroe, England; Ross Pointon, Stoke-on-Trent, England).

As a part of their agreement to work as coaches for The Ultimate Fighter 3, Shamrock and Ortiz had a rematch of their UFC 40 fight at UFC 61

A 5 disc DVD set of the entire season, full finale, and auditions was released in stores entitled The Ultimate Fighter 3: The Ultimate Grudge.

== Cast ==
=== Coaches and Trainers ===
- Team Ortiz
  - Tito Ortiz, head coach
  - Dean Lister, jiu jitsu coach
  - Saul Soliz, kickboxing coach
  - Wing Butler, sign language interpreter
- Team Shamrock
  - Ken Shamrock, head coach
  - Roman Pollock, boxing coach
  - Dan Freeman, nutrition/strength coach

=== Fighters ===
- Middleweights
  - Team Ortiz: Mike Stine, Kendall Grove, Rory Singer, Danny Abbadi
  - Team Shamrock: Kalib Starnes, Solomon Hutcherson, Ed Herman, Ross Pointon
- Light Heavyweights
  - Team Ortiz: Matt Hamill, Michael Bisping, Noah Inhofer, Josh Haynes
  - Team Shamrock: Jesse Forbes, Kristian Rothaermel, Tait Fletcher, Mike Nickels

=== Host ===
- Dana White

== Episodes ==
Episode 1: Fresh Meat (Original Air Date: 6 April 2006)

- Tito Ortiz and Ken Shamrock are introduced as the coaches.
- A coin is flipped (red for Ortiz, green for Shamrock) and Ortiz wins, meaning he got to pick the first fighter

Coach	1st Pick	2nd Pick	3rd Pick	4th Pick	5th Pick	6th Pick	7th Pick	8th Pick
Ortiz	Matt Hamill	Rory Singer	Michael Bisping	Kendall Grove	Noah Inhofer	Mike Stine	Josh Haynes	Danny Abbadi
Shamrock	Jesse Forbes	Kalib Starnes	Kristian Rothaermel	Solomon Hutcherson	Mike Nickels	Ed Herman	Ross Pointon	Tait Fletcher

- Kalib Starnes defeated Mike Stine by KO (punches) at 2:09 of the first round.

Episode 2: The Basketball (Original Air Date: 13 April 2006)

- Noah Inhofer defeated Jesse Forbes by submission (armbar) at 2:35 of the first round.
- Team Ortiz gains control of the matches.

Episode 3: Team Dagger (Original Air Date: 20 April 2006)

- Grove and Solomon Hutcherson befriend each other and declare themselves "Team Dagger," despite being on different teams. They will try to share information with each other to make sure that they both make it to the finale.
- Kendall Grove defeated Ross Pointon by submission (rear naked choke) at 3:45 of the first round.
- Team Ortiz retains control of the match-ups.

Episode 4: Hitting it Hard (Original Air Date: 27 April 2006)

- Michael Bisping defeated Kristian Rothaermel by TKO (strikes) at 3:51 of the first round.
- Team Ortiz retains control of the matches.

Episode 5: The Truce Is Over (Original Air Date: 4 May 2006)

- The fighters watch UFC 57. After Randy Couture makes a retirement announcement, Ed Herman declares he will make it to the finals and win for Couture's honor.
- Rory Singer defeated Solomon Hutcherson by KO (head kick and punches) after 0:21 of the second round.
- Team Ortiz retains control of the matches.

Episode 6: The Letter (Original Air Date: 11 May 2006)

- There is no fight in the episode, although Team Ortiz selects Josh Haynes to fight Tait Fletcher.
- Noah Inhofer decides to quit the show and return to Yankton, South Dakota after receiving a letter informing him that his girlfriend back home believes he has cheated on her. It was never explained how it was possible for him to receive a letter when a strict policy denying all external communication was in place.
- A previously eliminated fighter returns to take Inhofer's place, but it is not disclosed during the episode who this fighter is.

Episode 7: Mohawk (Original Air Date: 18 May 2006)

- Jesse Forbes returns to Team Shamrock and takes Noah Inhofer's spot in the semifinals.
- Josh Haynes defeated Tait Fletcher via split decision after two rounds.
- Officially, Team Ortiz retains control of the match-ups. However, as only two middleweights who have not yet fought remain, the next match will be Danny Abbadi vs. Ed Herman.

Episode 8: The Fuse Is Lit (Original Air Date: 25 May 2006)

- Ed Herman defeated Danny Abbadi by submission (armbar) at 4:14 of the first round.
- Officially, Team Shamrock regains control of the matches. However, as only two light heavyweights who have not yet fought remain, the final first-round match will be Matt Hamill vs. Mike Nickels.

Episode 9 :The Golden Boy (Original Air Date: 1 June 2006)

- Matt Hamill defeated Mike Nickels via unanimous decision after two rounds.
- Hamill is sent to the hospital after his victory, due to injury.
- The way matches are determined appears to be changing, although it is not revealed exactly how.

Episode 10: Full House (Original Air Date: 8 June 2006)

- Most of the first-round losers are brought back to live in the house and help train the semifinalists.
- White proposes that Ortiz and Shamrock play eight ball billiards (best two out of three games) for a US$10,000 prize. Shamrock wins 2 games to 0.
- Despite winning the last match, Matt Hamill is declared out of the competition due to injury. Mike Nickels is not an option to replace Hamill, as he was badly bruised and had a broken nose from his fight with Hamill.
- To the surprise of White and both coaches, both Tait Fletcher and Kristian Rothaermel turn down offers to replace Hamill in the semifinals.
- Ross Pointon agrees to replace Hamill and fight in the higher 205-pound light heavyweight class despite originally entering the competition as a middleweight.
- The semifinal matches are decided by White and the two coaches. Fighters on the same team are now eligible to face one another.
- The middleweight semifinal matches are Grove against Starnes and Ed Herman vs. Rory Singer.
- The light heavyweight semifinal matches are Josh Haynes vs. Jesse Forbes and Pointon matched up against Michael Bisping in a battle of the British.
- All semi-final matches will be three 5-minute rounds.
- Kendall Grove defeated Kalib Starnes by verbal submission (rib injury) at 0:30 of the third round..

Episode 11: The Jungle (Original Air Date: 15 June 2006)

- Kalib Starnes returns from the hospital and reveals that his ribs were dislocated during the previous fight.
- Singer finds his property defaced and blames Ed Herman and Jesse Forbes. Singer defaces their boxing gloves and lockers and rubs Herman's gloves against his naked buttocks.
- In retaliation, Herman hides Singer's boxing gloves and leg guards around the gym and urinates on his headgear.
- Singer finds his gear missing and goes outside to confront Herman. They get into an argument and Herman and Forbes reveal that it was Kendall Grove who had been defacing Singer's gear.
- Matt Hamill returns from the hospital and is surprised to find out that he is out of the competition due to medical suspension.
- Ed Herman defeated Rory Singer by submission (rear naked choke) at 2:31 of the second round.

Episode 12: Bangin' (Original Air Date: 15 June 2006)

- Josh Haynes defeated Jesse Forbes via submission (guillotine choke) at 0:18 of the second round.
- The fighters (excluding the British) party wildly before the last semifinal fight and the house is trashed.
- Michael Bisping defeated Ross Pointon by submission (strikes) with 2:47 left in the first round.

== Tournament Bracket ==
=== Middleweight Bracket ===
Elimination Round
Kalib Starnes	KO
Mike Stine	1
Ross Pointon	1
Kendall Grove	SUB
Solomon Hutcherson	2
Rory Singer	KO
Ed Herman	SUB
Danny Abbadi	1

Semi-finals
Kalib Starnes	3
Kendall Grove	SUB
Rory Singer	2
Ed Herman	SUB

Finale
Kendall Grove	UD
Ed Herman	3

=== Light Heavyweight Bracket ===
Elimination Round
Jesse Forbes	1
Noah Inhofer	SUB
Tait Fletcher	2
Josh Haynes	SD
Mike Nickels	2
Matt Hamill	UD
Kristian Rothaermel	1
Michael Bisping	TKO

Semi-finals
Jesse Forbes *	2
Josh Haynes	SUB
Ross Pointon *	1
Michael Bisping	TKO

Finale
Josh Haynes	2
Michael Bisping	TKO

* Inhofer decided to quit the show. His semi-finals spot was then replaced by Forbes.

* Hamill was injured after his fight. Pointon stepped up one weight class to replace him.

Legend
	Team Ortiz
	Team Shamrock
UD	Unanimous Decision
SD	Split Decision
SUB	Submission
(T) KO	(Technical) Knockout

== The Ultimate Fighter 3 Finale ==
The Ultimate Fighter: Team Ortiz vs. Team Shamrock Finale
- The poster for The Ultimate Fighter: Team Ortiz vs. Team Shamrock Finale
- Promotion: Ultimate Fighting Championship
- Date: June 24, 2006
- Venue: Hard Rock Hotel and Casino
- City: Las Vegas, Nevada

Event chronology
UFC 60: Hughes vs Gracie	The Ultimate Fighter: Team Ortiz vs. Team Shamrock Finale	Ultimate Fight Night 5

The Ultimate Fighter: Team Ortiz vs. Team Shamrock Finale (also known as The Ultimate Fighter 3 Finale) was a mixed martial arts event held by the Ultimate Fighting Championship (UFC) on June 24, 2006. Featured were the finals from The Ultimate Fighter 3 in both the Middleweight and Light Heavyweight divisions as well as a main event between Kenny Florian and Sam Stout.

This event also marked the debut of future Middleweight Champion Michael Bisping.

During the event Randy Couture was inducted into the UFC Hall of Fame and the return of Jens Pulver was announced.

=== Results ===
Main Card
Weight class				Method	Round	Time	Notes
Lightweight	Kenny Florian	def.	Sam Stout	Submission (rear-naked choke)	1	1:46
Light Heavyweight	Michael Bisping	def.	Josh Haynes	TKO (punches)	2	4:14	(Note: Bisping wins by TKO (strikes) at 4:14 of the second round to become the Season 3 Light Heavyweight winner of The Ultimate Fighter.)
Middleweight	Kendall Grove	def.	Ed Herman	Decision (unanimous) (29–28, 29–28, 29–28)	3	5:00	(Note: Grove wins by unanimous decision with all three judges scored the fight 29–28 to become the Season 3 Middleweight winner of The Ultimate Fighter. Dana White grants both fighters the six-figure contract.)
Light Heavyweight	Keith Jardine	def.	Wilson Gouveia	Decision (unanimous) (29–28, 29–28, 29–28)	3	5:00
Preliminary Card
Middleweight	Rory Singer	def.	Ross Pointon	Submission (triangle choke)	1	0:44
Middleweight	Kalib Starnes	def.	Danny Abbadi	Submission (rear-naked choke)	1	2:56
Middleweight	Luigi Fioravanti	def.	Solomon Hutcherson	KO (punch)	1	4:15
Light Heavyweight	Matt Hamill	def.	Jesse Forbes	TKO (punches)	1	4:47	(Note: This match was televised following the main event.)
Light Heavyweight	Mike Nickels	def.	Wes Combs	Submission (rear-naked choke)	1	3:10

=== Bonus awards ===
The following fighters received bonuses.

- Fight of the Night: Kendall Grove vs. Ed Herman
- Knockout of the Night: Luigi Fioravanti
- Submission of the Night: Kenny Florian and Rory Singer

=== Encyclopedia awards ===
Michael Bisping was honored for an award in the October 2011 book titled UFC Encyclopedia.

- Knockout of the Night: Michael Bisping

== Reported payout ==
Michael Bisping: $10,000

Kendall Grove: $10,000

Rory Singer: $10,000

Mike Nickels: $10,000

Matt Hamill: $10,000

Kalib Starnes: $10,000

Keith Jardine: $10,000

Solomon Hutcherson: $5,000

Josh Haynes: $5,000

Ed Herman: $5,000

Ross Pointon: $5,000

Jesse Forbes: $5,000

Danny Abaddi: $5,000

Luigi Fioravanti: $4,000

Sam Stout: $4,000

Wes Combs: $2,000

Wilson Gouveia: $2,000

Disclosed Fighter Payroll: $124,000

== Coaches' Fight ==
UFC 61: Bitter Rivals was held on July 8, 2006 in Las Vegas, Nevada.

- Light Heavyweight bout: Tito Ortiz vs. Ken Shamrock

Tito Ortiz defeated Ken Shamrock via TKO (punches) at 1:18 of the first round.

== See also ==
- Ultimate Fighting Championship
- List of UFC champions
- List of UFC events
- 2006 in UFC
- The Ultimate Fighter
- List of current UFC fighters
