= Ortiz vs. Shamrock 3: The Final Chapter =

UFC mixed martial arts event in 2006

UFC: Ortiz vs. Shamrock 3: The Final Chapter
- The poster for UFC: Ortiz vs. Shamrock 3: The Final Chapter
- Promotion: Ultimate Fighting Championship
- Date: October 10, 2006
- Venue: Hard Rock Live at the Seminole Hard Rock Hotel and Casino
- City: Hollywood, Florida
- Attendance: 3,510

Event chronology
UFC 63: Hughes vs. Penn	UFC: Ortiz vs. Shamrock 3: The Final Chapter	UFC 64: Unstoppable

UFC: Ortiz vs. Shamrock 3: The Final Chapter (also known as UFC Fight Night 6.5) was a mixed martial arts event held by the Ultimate Fighting Championship on October 10, 2006. The event took place at the Seminole Hard Rock Hotel and Casino in Hollywood, Florida and was broadcast live on Spike TV in the United States and Canada.

== Background ==
The main event featured the third and final encounter between Tito Ortiz and Ken Shamrock. At UFC 61, the two fighters met for a second time, with Ortiz reigning victorious via technical knockout. However, some critics contend that the fight was stopped too early by referee Herb Dean. At the UFC 62 weigh-ins, UFC President Dana White announced the third Ortiz-Shamrock encounter. Tickets went on sale on Tuesday, August 29, 2006, and sold out in two days.

The two-hour broadcast drew a 3.1 overall rating, with the main event of Tito Ortiz and Ken Shamrock fighting for a third time drawing a 4.3 rating. Quoting MMA Weekly's Ivan Trembow, "That breaks down to an amazing 5.7 million viewers for the Ortiz vs. Shamrock fight. This shatters the UFC's previous record for the number of people watching a UFC fight at any given time." The overall ratings record would not be matched until UFC 75 on September 8, 2007.

== Results ==
Main Card
Weight class				Method	Round	Time	Notes
Light Heavyweight	Tito Ortiz	def.	Ken Shamrock	TKO (punches)	1	2:23	(Note: Shamrock announces his retirement after the fight, although the retirement only lasted roughly a year and a half.)
Middleweight	Kendall Grove	def.	Chris Price	Submission (elbows)	1	3:59
Middleweight	Jason MacDonald	def.	Ed Herman	Submission (triangle choke)	1	2:43
Light Heavyweight	Matt Hamill	def.	Seth Petruzelli	Decision (unanimous) (29–28, 30–27, 29–28)	3	5:00
Preliminary Card
Middleweight	Nate Marquardt	def.	Crafton Wallace	Submission (rear-naked choke)	2	1:14	(Note: Wallace was a late replacement for Thales Leites, who experienced difficulties processing his visa in time for the bout.)
Welterweight	Tony DeSouza	def.	Dustin Hazelett	Submission (kimura)	1	3:59
Middleweight	Rory Singer	def.	Josh Haynes	Decision (unanimous) (29–28, 29–28, 29–28)	3	5:00
Welterweight	Thiago Alves	def.	John Alessio	Decision (unanimous) (30–27, 30–27, 30–27)	3	5:00
Welterweight	Marcus Davis	def.	Forrest Petz	Submission (guillotine choke)	1	4:58

== Bonus awards ==
The following fighters received $30,000 bonuses.

- Fight of the Night: Matt Hamill vs. Seth Petruzelli
- Knockout of the Night: Tito Ortiz
- Submission of the Night: Jason MacDonald

== See also ==
- Ultimate Fighting Championship
- List of UFC champions
- List of UFC events
- 2006 in UFC
