= Jesse Forbes =

American mixed martial arts fighter

- Born: October 24, 1984 (age 41); Portland, Maine, United States
- Other names: Kid Hercules
- Height: 6 ft 2 in (1.88 m)
- Weight: 185 lb (84 kg; 13.2 st)
- Division: Light Heavyweight; Middleweight
- Reach: 75.0 in (191 cm)
- Stance: Southpaw
- Fighting out of: Tempe, Arizona, United States
- Team: Lion's Den Arizona; Arizona Combat Sports
- Years active: 2005–2010

Mixed martial arts record
- Total: 20
- Wins: 15
- By knockout: 6
- By submission: 8
- By decision: 1
- Losses: 5
- By knockout: 2
- By submission: 1
- By decision: 2

Other information
- Mixed martial arts record from Sherdog

Jesse Lee Forbes (born October 24, 1984) is a retired American mixed martial artist. A professional competitor from 2005 until 2010, he competed for the UFC, WEC, the MFC, and was a competitor on The Ultimate Fighter 3.

== Background ==
Forbes was born in Portland, Maine, and moved to Arizona. He was a two-time All-State wrestler at Corona del Sol High School in Tempe, Arizona, before going on to wrestle at Pima Community College, where he was a NJCAA All-American. Former UFC fighter Drew Fickett is also an alumnus of PCC, and Forbes trained with him soon after college.

== Mixed martial arts career ==
=== The Ultimate Fighter ===
Forbes signed with the UFC to appear on The Ultimate Fighter 3.

Forbes was the first pick on Team Ken Shamrock and second overall. Shamrock explained that when Tito Ortiz chose Matt Hamill as his first pick that he would have to pick someone he thought could beat Hamill, and he thought Forbes was that person. While on the show, Forbes was the youngest in the house. Despite Shamrock's belief that Forbes was a force to be reckoned with, he lost his preliminary fight against Noah Inhofer via submission. He was brought back on the show after Inhofer asked to be sent home (therefore disqualifying him from the competition) for fear that his girlfriend believed he had cheated on her. Forbes returned with a mohawk and a second chance that put him in Inhofer's semi-finals spot.

Forbes lost again in his just received semi-final spot to Josh Haynes via guillotine choke despite dominating the first round that even Ortiz admitted could have been scored 10-8.

Forbes was pitted against Team Ortiz's Matt Hamill at the finale of the show. Forbes lost again that night via TKO in the first round.

=== Post-TUF ===
Forbes compiled an 11-2 record after being released from the UFC, including notable wins over fellow UFC veterans Jesse Taylor and James Head.

=== Return to UFC ===
Forbes made his UFC return on January 11, 2010 at UFC Fight Night 20 against Nick Catone, replacing an injured Steve Steinbeiss. Forbes lost the fight via controversial split decision.

Forbes faced Ryan Jensen at UFC 114 on May 29, 2010. He lost the fight via guillotine choke submission in the first round dropping his UFC record to 0-3. After his second straight loss, he was released from the UFC once again.

=== Post-UFC career ===
In his first fight since leaving the UFC, Forbes fought Strikeforce veteran Anthony Smith at Crowbar MMA: Fall Brawl on September 11, 2010. He won via second round TKO.

Forbes then faced Justin Guthrie at Crowbar MMA: Winter Brawl on December 10, 2010. He won via triangle choke submission.

== Personal life ==
Forbes is currently a firefighter/paramedic with the Phoenix Fire Department.

== Mixed martial arts record ==
Professional record breakdown
| 20 matches | 15 wins | 5 losses |
| By knockout | 6 | 2 |
| By submission | 8 | 1 |
| By decision | 1 | 2 |

| Res. | Record | Opponent | Method | Event | Date | Round | Time | Location | Notes |
|---|---|---|---|---|---|---|---|---|---|
| Win | 15–5 | Justin Guthrie | Submission (triangle choke) | Crowbar MMA: Winter Brawl | December 10, 2010 | 2 | 1:57 | Fargo, North Dakota, United States | |
| Win | 14–5 | Anthony Smith | TKO (punches) | Crowbar MMA: Fall Brawl | September 11, 2010 | 2 | 1:28 | Fargo, North Dakota, United States | |
| Loss | 13–5 | Ryan Jensen | Submission (guillotine choke) | UFC 114 | May 29, 2010 | 1 | 1:06 | Las Vegas, Nevada, United States | |
| Loss | 13–4 | Nick Catone | Decision (split) | UFC Fight Night: Maynard vs. Diaz | January 11, 2010 | 3 | 5:00 | Fairfax, Virginia, United States | |
| Win | 13–3 | James Head | Decision (unanimous) | Pro Battle MMA | August 22, 2009 | 3 | 5:00 | Springdale, Arkansas, United States | |
| Win | 12–3 | Cleburn Walker | Submission (rear-naked choke) | 5150 Combat: Rumble at the Rally | June 27, 2009 | 1 | 3:02 | Sparks, Oklahoma, United States | |
| Win | 11–3 | Dave Vitkay | TKO (punches) | Wild Bill's Fight Night 19 | April 17, 2009 | 1 | 2:05 | Duluth, Georgia, United States | |
| Win | 10–3 | Shane Dezee | TKO (punches) | Extreme Beatdown | April 11, 2009 | 1 | 1:34 | San Carlos, Arizona, United States | |
| Win | 9–3 | JR Schumacher | TKO (punches) | MTXAFN 2: Evolution | January 9, 2009 | 1 | 3:13 | Las Vegas, Nevada, United States | |
| Loss | 8–3 | Ryan Jimmo | Decision (unanimous) | XMMA 6: House of Pain | November 8, 2008 | 3 | 5:00 | Montreal, Canada | |
| Win | 8–2 | Bernard Rutherford | TKO (punches) | Wild Bill's Fight Night 15 | September 19, 2008 | 1 | 2:37 | Duluth, Georgia, United States | |
| Win | 7–2 | Chris Camozzi | Submission (armbar) | MFC 15: Rags to Riches | February 22, 2008 | 3 | 1:45 | Edmonton, Canada | |
| Win | 6–2 | Victor Moreno | TKO (punches) | MTXAFN: Let's Get it On | January 8, 2008 | 1 | 1:38 | Las Vegas, Nevada, United States | |
| Loss | 5–2 | Bryan Baker | TKO (punches) | WEC 30 | September 5, 2007 | 1 | 4:15 | Las Vegas, Nevada, United States | |
| Win | 5–1 | Jesse Taylor | Submission (armbar) | Tuff-N-Uff 2 | April 14, 2007 | 1 | 1:21 | Las Vegas, Nevada, United States | Middleweight debut. |
| Win | 4–1 | Tim Peacock | Submission (triangle choke) | WFC: Desert Storm | March 31, 2007 | 1 | 0:50 | Camp Verde, Arizona, United States | |
| Win | 3–1 | Michael Gonzalez | Submission (rear-naked choke) | CFF: Cage Fighting Federation | November 10, 2006 | 1 | N/A | Albuquerque, New Mexico, United States | |
| Loss | 2–1 | Matt Hamill | TKO (strikes) | The Ultimate Fighter: Team Ortiz vs. Team Shamrock Finale | June 24, 2006 | 1 | 4:47 | Las Vegas, Nevada, United States | |
| Win | 2–0 | Scott Svobada | Submission (rear-naked choke) | USA MMA: Pacific Northwest Invitational 1 | December 14, 2005 | 1 | N/A | Tacoma, Washington, United States | |
| Win | 1–0 | Arturo Segovia | Submission (armbar) | RITC 72: Welcome to the Fort | July 16, 2005 | 2 | 2:14 | Glendale, Arizona, United States | |
