= Ed Herman =

American mixed martial arts fighter

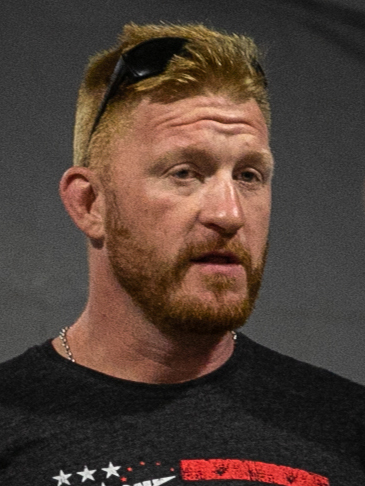
- Herman in 2022
- Born: Edward Benson Herman; October 2, 1980 (age 46); Vancouver, Washington, United States
- Other names: Short Fuse
- Height: 6 ft 2 in (1.88 m)
- Weight: 205 lb (93 kg; 14.6 st)
- Division: Light Heavyweight; Middleweight
- Reach: 77 in (196 cm)
- Fighting out of: Portland, Oregon, United States
- Team: Team Quest (2002–2010); Trials MMA (2010–2015); American Top Team Portland (2015–present)
- Rank: Black belt in Brazilian Jiu-Jitsu under Fabiano Scherner
- Years active: 2003–2023

Mixed martial arts record
- Total: 43
- Wins: 26
- By knockout: 7
- By submission: 14
- By decision: 5
- Losses: 16
- By knockout: 4
- By submission: 6
- By decision: 6
- No contests: 1

Other information
- Mixed martial arts record from Sherdog

Edward Benson Herman (born October 2, 1980) is an American former professional mixed martial artist who competed in the Light Heavyweight division of the Ultimate Fighting Championship. A professional competitor from 2003 to 2023, Herman was a finalist on SpikeTV's The Ultimate Fighter 3, and has also competed for Strikeforce and Pancrase.

At the time of his retirement, Herman had the longest uninterrupted tenure on the active roster in the UFC (made promotional debut on June 24, 2006).

== Background ==
Herman was born and primarily raised in Vancouver, Washington, by his father who competed in wrestling for The University of Iowa. Herman attended Columbia River High School where he competed in wrestling and football during his junior and senior years. Shortly after high school Herman began training in mixed martial arts at Team Quest.

== Mixed martial arts career ==
=== SportFight ===
After compiling a 4–1 record under the SportFight banner, a 24 year old Ed Herman would capture the light heavyweight championship against eventual UFC light heavyweight champion Glover Teixeira at SF 9: Respect. After the bout Glover would go on a 20 fight, 9 year unbeaten streak. Herman would never defend the belt, and shortly after would be selected to be a participant on SpikeTV's The Ultimate Fighter.

=== The Ultimate Fighter ===
While on the third season of The Ultimate Fighter, he won a preliminary victory against Danny Abaddi via armbar submission. In the semifinals, he defeated Rory Singer via rear-naked choke submission. He then lost to Kendall Grove in the finals by unanimous decision. Despite his loss, Herman was subsequently awarded a contract by UFC president Dana White based on his performance.

=== Ultimate Fighting Championship ===
Herman made his UFC debut at The Ultimate Fighter 3 Finale, where he lost to Kendall Grove in the finals by unanimous decision.

Herman lost his second fight to Jason MacDonald at Ortiz vs. Shamrock 3: The Final Chapter via triangle choke submission in round one.

At UFC Fight Night: Evans vs Salmon, Herman scored his first UFC victory in a Catchweight contest defeating Chris Price via armbar midway through round one. At the weigh in Herman made the 186 lb limit however Price did not take to the scales, coming back later that evening to record 192 lb.

Herman won his second consecutive UFC fight by defeating Scott Smith via rear-naked choke submission. This fight was held at UFC 72 in Belfast, Northern Ireland. Herman won Submission of the Night honors for his performance.

In Herman's fourth UFC fight, he took on Canadian fighter Joe Doerksen at UFC 78 who held a prior victory over Herman via submission. Herman avenged that loss, winning the fight by knocking Doerksen out in the third round and receiving Knockout of the Night honors in the process.

At UFC 83, Herman took on undefeated Brazilian fighter Demian Maia. Herman lost to Maia by triangle choke submission in the second round.

At UFC Fight Night: Diaz vs. Neer, Herman lost by split decision to Alan Belcher.

Herman's next fight came at UFC 97, where he defeated David Loiseau via unanimous decision.

In his fight against Aaron Simpson at UFC 102, Herman's knee was caught in a bad position near the end of the first-round during a takedown, with his opponent landing on the knee. Herman most likely sustained a serious injury at this point, visibly having trouble putting any weight on the injured leg after the round ended. Herman seemed to recover, and answered the bell for the second round. Early in the second, however, Herman further injured his knee attempting a high-kick, causing him to collapse to the mat in pain and the fight to be stopped.

Herman faced Tim Credeur on June 4, 2011, at The Ultimate Fighter 13 Finale, winning via TKO 48 seconds into the first round.

Herman then stepped in to replace an injured Tom Lawlor against Kyle Noke at UFC on Versus 5 on August 14, 2011. Herman defeated Noke by submission (heel hook) in the first round.

Herman faced Clifford Starks on February 4, 2012, at UFC 143. He won the fight via submission in the second round.

Herman faced Jake Shields on August 11, 2012, at UFC 150. Herman lost to Shields via unanimous decision. However, on October 12, 2012, it was revealed that Shields has tested positive for a banned substance and the result was overturned to a No Contest.

For the Strikeforce promotion's final show, Herman was allowed to step away from the UFC for one fight and signed to face Ronaldo Souza at Strikeforce: Marquardt vs. Saffiedine on January 12, 2013. Herman took the fight after several UFC fighters turned it down. He lost the fight via submission in the first round.

Herman faced Trevor Smith on July 27, 2013, at UFC on Fox 8. He won the fight by split decision. The win also earned Herman his second Fight of the Night bonus award.

Herman was expected to face Rafael Natal on November 16, 2013, at UFC 167. However, Natal was pulled from the pairing with Herman in favor of a bout with Tim Kennedy on November 6, 2013, in the event headliner at UFC Fight Night 31. Herman instead faced Thales Leites. He lost the fight via unanimous decision.

Herman faced Rafael Natal on May 10, 2014, at UFC Fight Night 40. He won the fight via unanimous decision.

Herman was expected to face Derek Brunson on December 13, 2014, at UFC on Fox 13. However, the fight was scrapped just hours before the fight, as Brunson was stricken with a stomach ailment. Subsequently, the bout with Brunson was rescheduled and took place on January 31, 2015, at UFC 183. Herman lost the fight via TKO in the first round.

Herman faced Tim Boetsch in a light heavyweight bout on January 17, 2016, at UFC Fight Night: Dillashaw vs. Cruz. He won the fight via TKO in the second round and earned a Performance of the Night bonus.

Herman faced Nikita Krylov on July 30, 2016, at UFC 201. He lost the fight via knockout due to a head kick in the second round.

Herman was expected to face Igor Pokrajac on March 4, 2017, at UFC 209. However, Pokrajac pulled out of the fight in early February citing an injury, and was replaced by Gadzhimurad Antigulov. Subsequently, on February 20, Herman revealed that he was injured and would be unable to compete at the event.

Herman faced C. B. Dollaway on July 7, 2017, at The Ultimate Fighter 25 Finale. He lost the back-and-forth bout via unanimous decision.

Herman faced Gian Villante on October 27, 2018, at UFC Fight Night 138. He lost the back-and-forth fight via split decision.

Herman faced Patrick Cummins on May 18, 2019, at UFC Fight Night 152. He won the fight via TKO in the first round.

Marking the first fight of his new four-fight contract with the UFC, Herman was expected to face Gadzhimurad Antigulov on November 9, 2019, at UFC Fight Night 163. However, on October 29, 2019, it was reported that Antigulov was pulled from the bout for undisclosed reason and he was replaced by Khadis Ibragimov. He won the fight via unanimous decision.

Herman was scheduled to face Da Un Jung on May 2, 2020, at UFC Fight Night: Hermansson vs. Weidman. However, on April 9, Dana White, the president of UFC announced that the event was postponed to a future date. The bout with Jung was expected to take place on August 1, 2020, at UFC Fight Night: Brunson vs. Shahbazyan. However, Jung was removed from the bout on July 23 due to alleged travel restrictions related to the COVID-19 pandemic. In turn, Herman was rebooked to face Gerald Meerschaert at the event. On the day of the event, Meerschaert was pulled out due to testing positive for COVID-19 and the bout was cancelled. It was rescheduled for September 12, 2020, at UFC Fight Night 177. However, Meerschaert withdrew from the bout again for undisclosed reasons and he was briefly replaced by John Allan. In turn, Allan was removed from the fight in early September as he faced travel restrictions related to the COVID-19 pandemic and was replaced by Mike Rodríguez. During the second round Rodríguez dropped Herman with a knee to the body that was called as an illegal low blow by the referee. However, further replay showed it was a legal strike to the midsection. Herman was given extra time to recover, and went on to win the fight via kimura submission in round three.

Herman was scheduled to face Danilo Marques on June 26, 2021, at UFC Fight Night 190. However, Herman was removed from the card due to undisclosed reasons on June 14 and replaced by Kennedy Nzechukwu.

Herman faced Alonzo Menifield on August 7, 2021, at UFC 265. He lost the fight via unanimous decision.

Herman was expected to face Maxim Grishin on February 12, 2022, at UFC 271. However, Herman pulled out of the bout and was replaced by William Knight.

Herman faced Zak Cummings on April 15, 2023, at UFC on ESPN 44. He lost the fight via TKO in the third round. After the fight, both Herman and Cummings announced their official retirement from mixed martial arts competition.

== Personal life ==
Herman lives with his girlfriend Crystal and her daughter. The couple had twins in January 2008. Before becoming a full-time professional fighter, Herman worked as a bartender and bouncer. He also has a younger brother and two step-sisters. In September 2017, Herman lost the tip of the index finger on his left hand as a result of a DIY plumbing accident at his home.

== Championships and accomplishments ==
- Ultimate Fighting Championship
  - The Ultimate Fighter 3 Middleweight Runner up
  - Fight of the Night (Two times) vs. Kendall Grove and Trevor Smith
  - Knockout of the Night (One time) vs. Joe Doerksen
  - Submission of the Night (Two times) vs. Chris Price and Scott Smith
  - Performance of the Night (One time) vs. Tim Boetsch
  - UFC.com Awards
    - 2006: Ranked #3 Fight of the Year vs. Kendall Grove
- SportFight
  - SportFight Light Heavyweight Championship (One time)

== Mixed martial arts record ==
Professional record breakdown
43 matches	26 wins	16 losses
By knockout	7	4
By submission	14	6
By decision	5	6
No contests	1	

Res.	Record	Opponent	Method	Event	Date	Round	Time	Location	Notes
Loss	26–16 (1)	Zak Cummings	TKO (punches)	UFC on ESPN: Holloway vs. Allen	April 15, 2023	3	4:13	Kansas City, Missouri, United States	Herman was deducted 1 point in round 2 due to an illegal upkick.
Loss	26–15 (1)	Alonzo Menifield	Decision (unanimous)	UFC 265	August 7, 2021	3	5:00	Houston, Texas, United States	
Win	26–14 (1)	Mike Rodríguez	Submission (kimura)	UFC Fight Night: Waterson vs. Hill	September 12, 2020	3	4:01	Las Vegas, Nevada, United States	
Win	25–14 (1)	Khadis Ibragimov	Decision (unanimous)	UFC Fight Night: Magomedsharipov vs. Kattar	November 9, 2019	3	5:00	Moscow, Russia	
Win	24–14 (1)	Patrick Cummins	TKO (knee and punches)	UFC Fight Night: dos Anjos vs. Lee	May 18, 2019	1	3:39	Rochester, New York, United States	
Loss	23–14 (1)	Gian Villante	Decision (split)	UFC Fight Night: Volkan vs. Smith	October 27, 2018	3	5:00	Moncton, New Brunswick, Canada	
Loss	23–13 (1)	C. B. Dollaway	Decision (unanimous)	The Ultimate Fighter: Redemption Finale	July 7, 2017	3	5:00	Las Vegas, Nevada, United States	
Loss	23–12 (1)	Nikita Krylov	KO (head kick)	UFC 201	July 30, 2016	2	0:40	Atlanta, Georgia, United States	
Win	23–11 (1)	Tim Boetsch	KO (knee)	UFC Fight Night: Dillashaw vs. Cruz	January 17, 2016	2	1:39	Boston, Massachusetts, United States	Return to Light Heavyweight. Performance of the Night.
Loss	22–11 (1)	Derek Brunson	TKO (punches)	UFC 183	January 31, 2015	1	0:36	Las Vegas, Nevada, United States	
Win	22–10 (1)	Rafael Natal	Decision (unanimous)	UFC Fight Night: Brown vs. Silva	May 10, 2014	3	5:00	Cincinnati, Ohio, United States	
Loss	21–10 (1)	Thales Leites	Decision (unanimous)	UFC 167	November 16, 2013	3	5:00	Las Vegas, Nevada, United States	
Win	21–9 (1)	Trevor Smith	Decision (split)	UFC on Fox: Johnson vs. Moraga	July 27, 2013	3	5:00	Seattle, Washington, United States	Fight of the Night.
Loss	20–9 (1)	Ronaldo Souza	Submission (kimura)	Strikeforce: Marquardt vs. Saffiedine	January 12, 2013	1	3:10	Oklahoma City, Oklahoma, United States	Catchweight (194 lb) bout.
NC	20–8 (1)	Jake Shields	NC (overturned by commission)	UFC 150	August 11, 2012	3	5:00	Denver, Colorado, United States	Originally a unanimous decision win for Shields; overturned after he tested positive for a banned diuretic.
Win	20–8	Clifford Starks	Submission (rear-naked choke)	UFC 143	February 4, 2012	2	1:43	Las Vegas, Nevada, United States	
Win	19–8	Kyle Noke	Submission (inverted heel hook)	UFC Live: Hardy vs. Lytle	August 14, 2011	1	4:15	Milwaukee, Wisconsin, United States	
Win	18–8	Tim Credeur	TKO (punches)	The Ultimate Fighter: Team Lesnar vs. Team dos Santos Finale	June 4, 2011	1	0:48	Las Vegas, Nevada, United States	
Loss	17–8	Aaron Simpson	TKO (knee injury)	UFC 102	August 29, 2009	2	0:17	Portland, Oregon, United States	
Win	17–7	David Loiseau	Decision (unanimous)	UFC 97	April 18, 2009	3	5:00	Montreal, Quebec, Canada	
Loss	16–7	Alan Belcher	Decision (split)	UFC Fight Night: Diaz vs. Neer	September 17, 2008	3	5:00	Omaha, Nebraska, United States	
Loss	16–6	Demian Maia	Technical Submission (triangle choke)	UFC 83	April 19, 2008	2	2:27	Montreal, Quebec, Canada	
Win	16–5	Joe Doerksen	KO (punch)	UFC 78	November 17, 2007	3	0:39	Newark, New Jersey, United States	Knockout of the Night.
Win	15–5	Scott Smith	Submission (rear-naked choke)	UFC 72	June 16, 2007	2	2:25	Belfast, Northern Ireland	Submission of the Night.
Win	14–5	Chris Price	Submission (armbar)	UFC Fight Night: Evans vs. Salmon	January 25, 2007	1	2:58	Hollywood, Florida, United States	Submission of the Night.
Loss	13–5	Jason MacDonald	Submission (triangle choke)	Ortiz vs. Shamrock 3: The Final Chapter	October 10, 2006	1	2:43	Hollywood, Florida, United States	
Loss	13–4	Kendall Grove	Decision (unanimous)	The Ultimate Fighter: Team Ortiz vs. Team Shamrock Finale	June 24, 2006	3	5:00	Las Vegas, Nevada, United States	Lost The Ultimate Fighter 3 Middleweight tournament. Fight of the Night.
Win	13–3	Dave Menne	TKO (corner stoppage)	Extreme Challenge 63	July 23, 2005	1	5:00	Hayward, Wisconsin, United States	
Win	12–3	Nick Thompson	TKO (injury)	Hand 2 Hand Combat	June 17, 2005	1	N/A	Canton, Ohio, United States	
Win	11–3	Rhomez Brower	Submission (armbar)	IFC: Mayhem in Montana	April 30, 2005	1	2:47	Billings, Montana, United States	
Win	10–3	Glover Teixeira	Decision (unanimous)	SF 9: Respect	March 26, 2005	3	5:00	Gresham, Oregon, United States	Won the SportFight Light Heavyweight Championship.
Loss	9–3	Joe Doerksen	Technical Submission (triangle choke)	SF 7: Frightnight	October 23, 2004	3	2:12	Gresham, Oregon, United States	
Win	9–2	Brian Ebersole	Submission (triangle choke)	SF 5: Stadium	August 28, 2004	2	N/A	Gresham, Oregon, United States	
Loss	8–2	Kazuo Misaki	Technical Submission (arm-triangle choke)	Pancrase: 2004 Neo-Blood Tournament Final	July 25, 2004	2	3:31	Tokyo, Japan	
Win	8–1	Shane Davis	Submission (armbar)	SF 4: Fight For Freedom	June 26, 2004	3	N/A	Gresham, Oregon, United States	
Win	7–1	Cory Devela	Submission (armbar)	Pride and Fury	June 3, 2004	1	3:20	Worley, Idaho, United States	
Win	6–1	Jacen Flynn	Submission (armbar)	SF 3: Dome	April 17, 2004	2	3:48	Gresham, Oregon, United States	
Win	5–1	Justin Hawes	Submission (armbar)	DesertBrawl 10	April 3, 2004	2	3:45	Bend, Oregon, United States	
Win	4–1	Derek Downey	TKO (punches)	SF 1: Revolution	February 21, 2004	3	2:14	Portland, Oregon, United States	
Win	3–1	Rich Guerin	Submission (keylock)	PPKA: Ultimate Fight Night 3	January 3, 2004	4	2:17	Yakima, Washington, United States	
Win	2–1	Ryan Pope	Submission (armbar)	Desert Brawl 9	November 8, 2003	1	0:24	Bend, Oregon, United States	
Loss	1–1	Shane Davis	Submission (armbar)	TQP: Sport Fight "Second Coming"	August 23, 2003	1	2:18	Gresham, Oregon, United States	
Win	1–0	Ryan Pope	Submission (armbar)	Xtreme Ring Wars 2	May 10, 2003	1	2:38	Pasco, Washington, United States	

== See also ==
- List of male mixed martial artists
