= Tim Boetsch =

American mixed martial arts fighter

- Born: January 28, 1981 (age 45); Lincolnville, Maine, United States
- Other names: The Barbarian
- Height: 6 ft 0 in (183 cm)
- Weight: 185 lb (84 kg; 13 st 3 lb)
- Division: Light Heavyweight; Middleweight
- Reach: 74 in (188 cm)
- Fighting out of: Sunbury, Pennsylvania, United States
- Team: Barbarian Combat Sports; AMC Pankration
- Trainer: Marcus Davis; Matt Hume
- Rank: black belt in Jeet Kune Do
- Wrestling: NCAA Division I Wrestling
- Years active: 2006–2019

Mixed martial arts record
- Total: 34
- Wins: 21
- By knockout: 13
- By submission: 3
- By decision: 5
- Losses: 13
- By knockout: 4
- By submission: 5
- By decision: 4

Other information
- Mixed martial arts record from Sherdog
- Last updated on: October 19, 2013

Timothy A. Boetsch (/ˈboʊtʃ/; born January 28, 1981) is a retired American professional mixed martial artist who fought in the Middleweight and Light Heavyweight divisions of the Ultimate Fighting Championship. A professional since 2006, Boetsch formerly competed as an alternate for the New York Pitbulls in the International Fight League and King of the Cage.

== Background ==
Tim Boetsch was born and raised in Lincolnville, Maine. He has a brother, Aaron, who is ten years older than him. Boetsch began wrestling when he was six years old, and had always admired his older brother's wrestling abilities. He also practiced Jeet Kune Do.

Boetsch attended Camden Hills Regional High School, continuing wrestling, and was very successful at the local high school level. He became a four-time state wrestling champion, and won almost every tournament that he participated in. He then attended Lock Haven University of Pennsylvania on a wrestling scholarship, but had mixed results in his wrestling career there. Boetsch had trouble settling into the right weight-class, and was not consistent. His college roommate, who was also on the wrestling team, had been training with the legendary Pat Miletich after he left college. Boetsch's roommate then offered him the opportunity to fight in Iowa, and Boetsch, who was landscaping in Pennsylvania at the time, accepted.

On August 4, 2012, Boetsch was inducted into the Maine Wrestling Hall of Fame.

== Mixed martial arts career ==
=== Early career ===
Boetsch had his first amateur fight in August 2006, and after dominating the first two opponents he faced in less than two minutes, made his transition to the professional ranks. Boetsch made his IFL debut as a late replacement to fight veteran Vladimir Matyushenko. He was given three days to prepare for the match, and fought the future champion to a decision, his first professional loss.

=== Ultimate Fighting Championship ===
After this performance, Boetsch made his UFC debut at UFC 81 as a late replacement to fight David Heath. He was given ten days to prepare for the fight, and won by TKO in the first round. Boetsch received particular acclaim and a fan following for the way he threw Heath onto his head at the end of the fight. Boetsch next made his main card debut in the UFC as a replacement to fight Matt Hamill at UFC Fight Night 13 with six weeks to prepare for the fight. Though he opened a large gash on Hamill's lower lip, he found himself winded in the second round, leading to a TKO loss due to strikes from the ground.

Boetsch fought submission specialist Michael Patt at UFC 88. For the first time in four fights, Boetsch did not enter the bout as a replacement for another fighter. Boetsch won by TKO in the first round.

Boetsch was released from the UFC following his loss to Jason Brilz at UFC 96, ending his four-fight contract with a 2–2 record.

=== Return to the UFC ===
After winning three fights in a row, Boetsch was re-signed by the UFC in mid-2010. He was scheduled to face Thiago Silva on August 7, 2010, at UFC 117, but Silva was forced out of the bout due to an injury. and replaced by UFC newcomer Todd Brown. Boetsch won a unanimous decision.

Boetsch faced Phil Davis on November 20, 2010, at UFC 123. He lost the fight via submission.

Boetsch subsequently dropped down to the Middleweight division. He faced Kendall Grove on May 28, 2011, at UFC 130 and won the fight via unanimous decision.

Boetsch faced Nick Ring on September 24, 2011, at UFC 135. He won the fight via unanimous decision.

Boetsch faced former UFC title challenger Yushin Okami on February 26, 2012 at UFC 144, taking place in Okami's home country of Japan. Boetsch was badly beaten in the first two rounds before rallying to claim a come from behind TKO victory in the third round, in what is arguably the biggest victory of his career to date. Veteran commentator Joe Rogan stated it as the greatest comeback in UFC history.

Boetsch was expected to face Michael Bisping on July 21, 2012, at UFC 149. However, Bisping was forced out of the bout with an injury and replaced by promotional newcomer Héctor Lombard. Boetsch defeated Lombard via split decision.

Boetsch was expected to face Chris Weidman on December 29, 2012, at UFC 155. However, Weidman was forced out of the bout due to an injury and was replaced by Costas Philippou. Boetsch had dominated the first round, but he received an eye poke and headbutt later in the fight and was bleeding a significant amount. Boetsch was never able to fully recover and slowed down significantly. He eventually lost the fight via TKO due to strikes, making this his first loss since moving to Middleweight.

Boetsch faced Mark Muñoz on July 6, 2013, at UFC 162, He lost the fight via unanimous decision.

Boetsch was expected to face Luke Rockhold on October 19, 2013, at UFC 166. However, Rockhold was forced out of the bout citing a knee injury and was replaced by C. B. Dollaway. While Dollaway seemingly controlled the action for the majority of the bout, he was docked a point for multiple eye pokes to Boetsch. Boetsch was declared the winner via split decision.

Boetsch eventually faced Luke Rockhold on April 26, 2014, at UFC 172. He lost the fight via submission in the first round.

Boetsch faced Brad Tavares on August 16, 2014, at UFC Fight Night 47. Boetsch scored a come from behind victory, defeating Tavares via second round TKO. The win also earned Boetsch his first Performance of the Night bonus award.

Boetsch next faced Thales Leites on January 31, 2015, at UFC 183. He lost the fight via technical submission due to an arm-triangle choke in the second round. Despite the loss, Boetsch was awarded a Fight of the Night bonus.

Boetsch faced Dan Henderson on June 6, 2015, in the main event at UFC Fight Night 68. He lost the fight via knockout in the first round.

Boetsch faced Ed Herman in a light heavyweight bout on January 17, 2016, at UFC Fight Night 81. He lost the fight via TKO in the second round.

Boetsch next faced Josh Samman on July 13, 2016, at UFC Fight Night 91. He won the fight via TKO in the second round.

Boetsch faced Rafael Natal on November 12, 2016, at UFC 205. He won the fight via TKO in the first round.

In the last fight of his contract, Boetsch faced Ronaldo Souza on February 11, 2017, at UFC 208. He lost the fight via submission in the first round.

Boetsch faced Johny Hendricks on June 25, 2017, at UFC Fight Night 112. He won the fight via TKO due to a head kick and punches early in the second round. The win also earned Boetsch his second Performance of the Night bonus award.

Boetsch faced Antônio Carlos Júnior on April 14, 2018, at UFC on Fox 29. He lost the fight via a rear-naked choke on round one.

Boetsch faced Omari Akhmedov on March 9, 2019, at UFC Fight Night 146. He lost the fight by unanimous decision.

In September 2019, Boetsch announced that he had retired.

== Personal life ==
Boetsch attended and graduated from the Lock Haven University of Pennsylvania with a degree in criminal justice. He is married and has two sons and a daughter.

Prior to pursuing a mixed martial arts career, Boetsch was a social worker with adolescents. He now owns a lawn and landscape business.

== Championships and accomplishments ==
=== Mixed martial arts ===
- 5150 Combat League
  - 5150 Light Heavyweight Championship (One time)
- Tequila CAZADORES Spirit Award
  - Tequila CAZADORES Spirit Award (Two times)
- Ultimate Fighting Championship
  - Fight of the Night (One time) vs. Thales Leites
  - Performance of the Night (Two times) vs. Brad Tavares and vs. Johny Hendricks
  - UFC.com Awards
    - 2008: Ranked #8 Newcomer of the Year
    - 2012: Upset of the Year vs. Héctor Lombard & Ranked #7 Upset of the Year vs. Yushin Okami
- Bloody Elbow
  - 2012 Comeback of the Year vs. Yushin Okami at UFC 144

== Mixed martial arts record ==
Professional record breakdown
34 matches	21 wins	13 losses
By knockout	13	4
By submission	3	5
By decision	5	4

Res.	Record	Opponent	Method	Event	Date	Round	Time	Location	Notes
Loss	21–13	Omari Akhmedov	Decision (unanimous)	UFC Fight Night: Lewis vs. dos Santos	March 9, 2019	3	5:00	Wichita, Kansas, United States	
Loss	21–12	Antônio Carlos Júnior	Submission (rear-naked choke)	UFC on Fox: Poirier vs. Gaethje	April 14, 2018	1	4:28	Glendale, Arizona, United States	
Win	21–11	Johny Hendricks	TKO (head kick and punches)	UFC Fight Night: Chiesa vs. Lee	June 25, 2017	2	0:46	Oklahoma City, Oklahoma, United States	Catchweight (188 lbs) bout; Hendricks missed weight. Performance of the Night.
Loss	20–11	Ronaldo Souza	Submission (kimura)	UFC 208	February 11, 2017	1	3:41	Brooklyn, New York, United States	
Win	20–10	Rafael Natal	KO (punches)	UFC 205	November 12, 2016	1	3:22	New York City, New York, United States	
Win	19–10	Josh Samman	TKO (punches)	UFC Fight Night: McDonald vs. Lineker	July 13, 2016	2	3:49	Sioux Falls, South Dakota, United States	
Loss	18–10	Ed Herman	KO (knee)	UFC Fight Night: Dillashaw vs. Cruz	January 17, 2016	2	1:39	Boston, Massachusetts, United States	Light Heavyweight bout.
Loss	18–9	Dan Henderson	KO (punches)	UFC Fight Night: Boetsch vs. Henderson	June 6, 2015	1	0:28	New Orleans, Louisiana, United States	
Loss	18–8	Thales Leites	Technical Submission (arm-triangle choke)	UFC 183	January 31, 2015	2	3:45	Las Vegas, Nevada, United States	Fight of the Night.
Win	18–7	Brad Tavares	TKO (punches)	UFC Fight Night: Bader vs. St. Preux	August 16, 2014	2	3:18	Bangor, Maine, United States	Performance of the Night.
Loss	17–7	Luke Rockhold	Submission (inverted triangle kimura)	UFC 172	April 26, 2014	1	2:08	Baltimore, Maryland, United States	
Win	17–6	C. B. Dollaway	Decision (split)	UFC 166	October 19, 2013	3	5:00	Houston, Texas, United States	
Loss	16–6	Mark Muñoz	Decision (unanimous)	UFC 162	July 6, 2013	3	5:00	Las Vegas, Nevada, United States	
Loss	16–5	Costas Philippou	TKO (punches)	UFC 155	December 29, 2012	3	2:11	Las Vegas, Nevada, United States	
Win	16–4	Héctor Lombard	Decision (split)	UFC 149	July 21, 2012	3	5:00	Calgary, Alberta, Canada	
Win	15–4	Yushin Okami	TKO (punches)	UFC 144	February 26, 2012	3	0:54	Saitama, Japan	
Win	14–4	Nick Ring	Decision (unanimous)	UFC 135	September 24, 2011	3	5:00	Denver, Colorado, United States	
Win	13–4	Kendall Grove	Decision (unanimous)	UFC 130	May 28, 2011	3	5:00	Las Vegas, Nevada, United States	Middleweight debut.
Loss	12–4	Phil Davis	Submission (kimura)	UFC 123	November 20, 2010	2	2:55	Auburn Hills, Michigan, United States	
Win	12–3	Todd Brown	Decision (unanimous)	UFC 117	August 7, 2010	3	5:00	Oakland, California, United States	
Win	11–3	Reese Shaner	KO (head kick)	NAFC: Stand Your Ground	April 3, 2010	1	1:05	West Allis, Wisconsin, United States	
Win	10–3	Rudy Lindsey	Submission (guillotine choke)	5150 Combat League	January 16, 2010	2	1:55	Tulsa, Oklahoma, United States	Won the 5150 Light Heavyweight Championship.
Win	9–3	Aaron Stark	Technical Submission (guillotine choke)	KOTC: Thunderstruck	August 15, 2009	2	1:18	Everett, Washington, United States	
Loss	8–3	Jason Brilz	Decision (unanimous)	UFC 96	March 7, 2009	3	5:00	Columbus, Ohio, United States	
Win	8–2	Michael Patt	TKO (punches)	UFC 88	September 6, 2008	1	2:03	Atlanta, Georgia, United States	
Loss	7–2	Matt Hamill	TKO (punches)	UFC Fight Night: Florian vs. Lauzon	April 2, 2008	2	1:25	Broomfield, Colorado, United States	
Win	7–1	David Heath	TKO (slam and punches)	UFC 81	February 2, 2008	1	4:52	Las Vegas, Nevada, United States	
Loss	6–1	Vladimir Matyushenko	Decision (unanimous)	IFL: 2007 Semifinals	August 2, 2007	3	4:00	East Rutherford, New Jersey, United States	
Win	6–0	Brendan Barrett	Submission (guillotine choke)	Extreme Challenge 81	July 28, 2007	2	3:00	West Orange, New Jersey, United States	
Win	5–0	Oleg Savitsky	TKO (punches)	Extreme Challenge 78	June 9, 2007	1	3:27	Asbury Park, New Jersey, United States	
Win	4–0	Lewis Pascavage	TKO (punches)	Reality Fighting 15	May 19, 2007	1	0:20	Atlantic City, New Jersey, United States	
Win	3–0	Hazim Ibrahim	TKO (submission to punches)	Extreme Challenge 75	March 23, 2007	1	1:10	Trenton, New Jersey, United States	
Win	2–0	Hazim Ibrahim	TKO (punches)	Reality Fighting 14	November 18, 2006	1	3:47	Atlantic City, New Jersey, United States	Won the vacant Reality Fighting Light Heavyweight Championship.
Win	1–0	Demian Decorah	TKO (submission to punches)	Madtown Throwdown 9	October 14, 2006	3	1:27	Madison, Wisconsin, United States	

== See also ==
- List of male mixed martial artists
