= Rory Singer =

American mixed martial arts fighter

- Born: May 28, 1976 (age 50); Brooklyn, New York, United States
- Other names: Outburst
- Nationality: American
- Height: 6 ft 2 in (1.88 m)
- Weight: 205 lb (93 kg; 14.6 st)
- Division: Middleweight (185 lb); Light Heavyweight (205 lb)
- Style: MMA; Muay thai, Kickboxing, Boxing, Submission wrestling, Brazilian jiu-jitsu
- Fighting out of: Athens, Georgia
- Team: Formerly known as the Hardcore Gym, now SBG Athens
- Rank: Brazilian Jiu Jitsu Blackbelt

Mixed martial arts record
- Total: 20
- Wins: 11
- By knockout: 2
- By submission: 6
- By decision: 3
- Losses: 9
- By knockout: 3
- By submission: 3
- By decision: 3

Other information
- Mixed martial arts record from Sherdog

Rory Michael Singer (born May 28, 1976) is an American mixed martial artist and Brazilian Jiu Jitsu Black Belt. Although Rory had made a name for himself as a 185-pound prospect; his big break came after meeting the producers of TUF. They were filming Forrest Griffin at The HardCore Gym for his fight against Stephan Bonnar in the finals of season 1. Forrest went on to win Season 1 and Rory was approached soon after to appear on Season 3.

== Mixed martial arts career ==
Singer has a background in many different styles of fighting, being involved in martial arts since he was 11 years old. He was taught kickboxing by his brother and then added karate, Taekwondo, and other traditional martial arts. He wrestled in high school, and is a former local Golden Gloves and Muay Thai champion. Singer is also a Black Belt in Brazilian Jiu-Jitsu. He is the co-owner of the noted MMA Gym SBG Athens along with his brother and Brazilian Jiu-Jitsu Black Belt Adam Singer. The HardCore Gym had produced such fighters as Forrest Griffin and Brian Bowles. Singer's MMA career includes fighting for several local organizations as well as the AFC, KOTC, PRIDE and the UFC. He gained fame from his appearance on Spike TV's series The Ultimate Fighter 3, making it to the semi-finals where he would lose to Ed Herman.

After a 5-year break from MMA, Singer was scheduled to fight Lodune Sincaid on September 26, 2014. However, Sincaid was pulled from the fight due to suspension by the California State Athletic Commission. Singer currently resides in Athens, Georgia, where he coaches BJJ, MMA, and Youth Martial Arts for people of all walks of life.

== Personal life ==
Singer married in August 2008. Singer is Jewish. He attended the University of Georgia where he earned a degree in biological engineering.

== Championships and accomplishments ==
- Ultimate Fighting Championship
  - UFC.com Awards
    - 2006: Ranked #9 Submission of the Year vs. Ross Pointon

== Mixed martial arts record ==
Professional record breakdown
20 matches	11 wins	9 losses
By knockout	2	3
By submission	6	3
By decision	3	3

Res.	Record	Opponent	Method	Event	Date	Round	Time	Location	Notes
Loss	11–9	Bryan Baker	TKO (punches)	MFC 20	February 20, 2009	1	4:56	Edmonton, Alberta, Canada	
Loss	11–8	Chilo Gonzalez	Submission (kneebar)	AFL: Erupption	March 7, 2008	1	N/A	Lexington, Kentucky, United States	
Loss	11–7	Jason MacDonald	TKO (punches and elbows)	UFC 72	June 16, 2007	2	3:18	Belfast, Northern Ireland	
Win	11–6	Matt Masterson	Decision (unanimous)	Wild Bill's Fight Night 8 (ISKA)	April 13, 2007	3	5:00	Atlanta, Georgia, United States	
Loss	10–6	Yushin Okami	TKO (submission to punches)	UFC 66: Liddell vs. Ortiz	December 30, 2006	3	4:03	Las Vegas, Nevada, United States	
Win	10–5	Josh Haynes	Decision (unanimous)	Ortiz vs. Shamrock 3: The Final Chapter	October 10, 2006	3	5:00	Hollywood, Florida, United States	
Win	9–5	Ross Pointon	Submission (triangle choke)	The Ultimate Fighter: Team Ortiz vs. Team Shamrock Finale	June 24, 2006	1	0:44	Las Vegas, Nevada, United States	Submission of the Night.
Win	8–5	Josh Tamsen	Submission (triangle choke)	Full Throttle 3	July 15, 2005	1	1:23	Georgia, U.S.	
Loss	7–5	Dennis Hallman	Submission (rear-naked choke)	Absolute Fighting Champions 11	February 12, 2005	1	N/A	Fort Lauderdale, Florida, United States	For vacant AFC Middleweight Championship.
Win	7–4	Jason Hathaway	Submission (rear-naked choke)	ISCF: Domination at the DAC	November 20, 2004	1	2:06	Atlanta, Georgia, United States	
Win	6–4	Diego Vitosky	Submission (rear-naked choke)	Absolute Fighting Championships 9	July 31, 2004	1	0:58	Fort Lauderdale, Florida, United States	
Win	5–4	Wilson Gouveia	KO (knee)	KOTC 32: Bringing Heat	January 24, 2004	2	4:55	Miami, Florida, United States	
Win	4–4	James Wakefield	Submission (armbar)	ISCF: Anarchy in August	August 2, 2003	1	N/A	Atlanta, Georgia, United States	
Loss	3–4	Ted Govola	Decision (split)	Hardcore Fighting Championships 1	May 24, 2003	3	N/A	Revere, Massachusetts, United States	
Loss	3–3	Daijiro Matsui	Decision (unanimous)	Pride FC: The Best, Vol. 3	October 20, 2002	2	5:00	Tokyo, Japan	
Loss	3–2	Dustin Denes	Submission (armlock)	WEFC 1: Bring It On	June 29, 2002	2	1:42	Marietta, Georgia, United States	
Win	3–1	Kelly Williams	TKO (submission to strikes)	ISCF: Battle at the Brewery	April 12, 2002	1	2:54	Atlanta, Georgia, United States	
Loss	2–1	Scott Shipman	Decision (unanimous)	RSF 7: Animal Instinct	January 26, 2002	3	N/A	Lakeland, Florida, United States	
Win	2–0	Butch Bacon	Decision (unanimous)	RSF 6: Mayhem in Myers	December 29, 2001	3	3:00	Fort Myers, Florida, United States	
Win	1–0	Ludwig Strydom	Submission (triangle choke)	Pride and Honor	November 24, 2001	2	0:16	South Africa	

== See also ==
- List of select Jewish mixed martial artists
