= 2005 in WEC =

World Extreme Cagefighting events

Information
- First date: January 22, 2005
- Last date: October 14, 2005

Events
- Total events: 5

Fights
- Total fights: 63
- Title fights: 8

Chronology
2004 in WEC	2005 in WEC	2006 in WEC

The year 2005 was the 5th year in the history of World Extreme Cagefighting, a mixed martial arts promotion based in the United States. In 2005 WEC held 5 events beginning with, WEC 13: Heavyweight Explosion.

== Title fights ==
Title fights in 2005
Weight class				Method	Round	Time	Event	Notes
Light Heavyweight	Jason Lambert	def.	Richard Montoya	Submission (Punches)	1	2:45	WEC 13: Heavyweight Explosion	(Note: For the WEC Light Heavyweight Championship.)
Lightweight	Gabe Ruediger (c)	def.	Jason Maxwell	Submission (Rear-Naked Choke)	1	3:28	WEC 14: Vengeance	(Note: For the WEC Lightweight Championship.)
Heavyweight	James Irvin (c)	def.	Doug Marshall	KO (Knee)	2	0:45	WEC 15: Judgment Day	(Note: For the WEC Heavyweight Championship.)
Middleweight	Joe Riggs	def.	Rob Kimmons	Submission (Punches)	1	1:24	WEC 15: Judgment Day	(Note: For the WEC Middleweight Championship.)
Super Heavyweight	Ron Waterman (c)	def.	Ricco Rodriguez	Decision (Unanimous)	3	5:00	WEC 16: Clash of the Titans 2	(Note: For the WEC Super Heavyweight Championship.)
Light Heavyweight	Scott Smith	def.	Tait Fletcher	TKO (Punches)	1	3:55	WEC 17: Halloween Fury 4	(Note: For the WEC Light Heavyweight Championship.)
Welterweight	Mike Pyle	def.	Bret Bergmark	Submission (Triangle Choke)	1	3:36	WEC 17: Halloween Fury 4	(Note: For the WEC Welterweight Championship.)
Lightweight	Gabe Ruediger (c)	def.	Sam Wells	Decision (Unanimous)	3	5:00	WEC 17: Halloween Fury 4	(Note: For the WEC Lightweight Championship.)

== Tournament Winners ==
Event	Date	Division	Winner	Runner-up
WEC 13	January 22, 2005	Heavyweight	Brandon Vera	Mike Whitehead
WEC 17	October 14, 2005	Light Heavyweight	Scott Smith	Tait Fletcher

== Events list ==
No.	Event	Date	Venue	Location	Attendance
17	WEC 17: Halloween Fury 4	October 14, 2005	Tachi Palace Hotel & Casino	Lemoore, California	
16	WEC 16: Clash of the Titans 2	August 18, 2005	Tachi Palace Hotel & Casino	Lemoore, California	
15	WEC 15: Judgment Day	May 19, 2005	Tachi Palace Hotel & Casino	Lemoore, California	
14	WEC 14: Vengeance	March 17, 2005	Tachi Palace Hotel & Casino	Lemoore, California	
13	WEC 13: Heavyweight Explosion	January 22, 2005	Tachi Palace Hotel & Casino	Lemoore, California	

== WEC 13: Heavyweight Explosion ==
WEC 13: Heavyweight Explosion was an event held on January 22, 2005 at the Tachi Palace in Lemoore, California, United States.

=== Results ===
Main Card
Weight class				Method	Round	Time	Notes
Super Heavyweight	Dan Christison	def.	Andre Roberts	Submission (Armbar)	1	3:26	(Note: For the Inaugural WEC Native American Super Heavyweight Championship.)
Light Heavyweight	Jason Lambert	def.	Richard Montoya	TKO (Submission to punches)	1	2:45	(Note: For the WEC Light Heavyweight Championship.)
	Brad Imes	def.	Lace Pele	TKO (Submission to punches)	1	2:04
	Jorge Oliveira	def.	Shonie Carter	Decision (Unanimous)	3	5:00
	Olaf Alfonso	def.	Chin Seng	KO	1	1:13
Heavyweight	Brandon Vera	def.	Mike Whitehead	TKO (Doctor Stoppage)	2	1:12	(Note: Tournament final.)
	Allan Weickert	def.	Jeremy Freitag	TKO	1	4:25
	Mike Whitehead	def.	Terroll Dees	Submission (Neck Crank)	1	3:43
	Brandon Vera	def.	Andre Mussi	KO (Knees and Punches)	1	0:51
	Jody Poff	def.	Houssain Oushani	Submission (Guillotine Choke)	1	1:51
	Van Palacio	def.	Fred Diaz	Decision (Split)	3	5:00

== WEC 14: Vengeance ==
WEC 14: Vengeance was an event held on March 17, 2005 at the Tachi Palace in Lemoore, California, United States.

=== Results ===
Main Card
Weight class				Method	Round	Time	Notes
	John Polakowski	def.	Olaf Alfonso	TKO (Corner Stoppage)	1	5:00
	Wesley Correira	def.	Walt Pels	KO (Punches)	1	0:23
Light Heavyweight	Terry Martin	def.	Homer Moore	TKO (Submission to punches)	2	3:14	(Note: For the vacant WEC Light Heavyweight Championship.)
Middleweight	Alex Serdyukov	def.	(c) Mark Weir	Submission (Arm-Triangle Choke)	2	2:56	(Note: For the WEC North American Middleweight Championship.)
	Brad Imes	def.	Mike Dexter	Submission (Triangle Choke)	1	3:44
	Abraham Baxter	def.	Patrick Kaase	TKO (Punches)	1	4:59
Lightweight	Gabe Ruediger (c)	def.	Jason Maxwell	Submission (Rear-Naked Choke)	1	3:28	(Note: For the WEC Lightweight Championship.)
	Brian Olsen	def.	Craig Zellner	TKO (Punches)	2	N/A
	Brian Gassaway	def.	Ross Ebanez	NC (Accidental Headbutt)	0	N/A
	Josh Green	def.	Troy Miller	Submission (Rear-Naked Choke)	1	1:56
	Antonio Banuelos	def.	Mike Lindquist	Submission (Rear-Naked Choke)	1	1:38
	Dan Marks	def.	Mike Alirez	KO (Head Kick)	1	0:31
	Carlton Jones	def.	Chris Botelho	TKO (Punches)	1	3:14

== WEC 15: Judgment Day ==
WEC 15: Judgment Day was an event held on May 19, 2005 at the Tachi Palace in Lemoore, California, United States.

=== Results ===
Main Card
Weight class				Method	Round	Time	Notes
Heavyweight	James Irvin (c)	def.	Doug Marshall	KO (Knee)	2	0:45	(Note: For the WEC Heavyweight Championship.)
Lightweight	Cole Escovedo	def.	Poppies Martinez	TKO (Leg Injury)	2	1:05	(Note: For the WEC Native American Lightweight Championship.)
Middleweight	Joe Riggs	def.	Rob Kimmons	TKO (Submission to punches)	1	1:24	(Note: For the WEC Middleweight Championship.)
	Chris Lytle	def.	Pat Healy	Decision (Split)	3	5:00
	Lavar Johnson	def.	Carlos Garcia	TKO (Punches)	1	1:09
	Rich Crunkilton	def.	Paul Jenkins	KO (Punches)	2	2:36
	Tony Alanis	def.	Johnny Fadella	TKO (Punches)	1	1:54
	Steve Ramirez	def.	Anthony Gonzales	Submission (Rear-Naked Choke)	1	4:38
	Josh Green	def.	Miguel Cosio	Submission (Rear-Naked Choke)	1	0:39
	Justin Levens	def.	Tony Lopez	Submission (Rear-Naked Choke)	1	3:46
	Cassio Werneck	def.	Toby Imada	Submission (Triangle Choke)	2	2:54
	Thomas Schulte	def.	Raven Seymon	Submission (Triangle Choke)	1	1:29
	Jay Hieron	def.	Adam Lynn	Decision (Unanimous)	3	5:00

== WEC 16: Clash of the Titans 2 ==
WEC 16: Clash of the Titans 2 was an event held on August 18, 2005 at the Tachi Palace in Lemoore, California, United States.

=== Results ===
Main Card
Weight class				Method	Round	Time	Notes
Super Heavyweight	Ron Waterman (c)	def.	Ricco Rodriguez	Decision (Unanimous)	3	5:00	(Note: For the WEC Super Heavyweight Championship.)
Middleweight	Alex Serdyukov (c)	def.	Victor Parfenov	TKO (Punches)	1	2:20	(Note: For the WEC North American Middleweight Championship.)
	Tosh Cook	def.	Troy Miller	Submission (Rear Naked Choke)	1	1:45
	Chris Sanford	def.	Josh Green	Submission (Guillotine Choke)	1	2:30
	Rafael del Real	def.	Jody Poff	No Contest	1	0:00
	Steve Ramirez	def.	Jason Biswell	TKO (Punches)	1	2:01
	Casey Olson	def.	Rolland Parli	TKO (Punches)	1	4:58
	Kenny Ento	def.	Chris Botelho	Submission (Armbar)	1	4:33
	Ernie Tiserino	def.	Van Palacio	Submission (Keylock)	3	2:48
	Allan Weickert	def.	Rocky Batastini	Submission (Armbar)	1	2:50
	Dan Marks	def.	Albert Rios	Submission (Armbar)	2	2:22

== WEC 17: Halloween Fury 4 ==
WEC 17: Halloween Fury 4 was an event held on October 14, 2005 at the Tachi Palace in Lemoore, California, United States.

=== Results ===
Main Card
Weight class				Method	Round	Time	Notes
Light Heavyweight	Scott Smith	def.	Tait Fletcher	TKO (Punches)	1	3:55	(Note: For the WEC Light Heavyweight Championship.)
	Ricco Rodriguez	def.	Jimmy Ambriz	TKO (Submission to punches)	1	4:13
	Lavar Johnson	def.	Corey Salter	TKO (Submission to strikes)	1	3:37
Welterweight	Mike Pyle	def.	Bret Bergmark	Submission (Triangle Choke)	1	3:36	(Note: For the WEC Welterweight Championship.)
Lightweight	Gabe Ruediger (c)	def.	Sam Wells	Decision (Unanimous)	3	5:00	(Note: For the WEC Lightweight Championship.)
	Poppies Martinez	def.	Robert Breslin	No Contest - Martinez Kicked in Groin	1	0:00
	Vernon White	def.	Alex Stiebling	KO (Punch)	2	0:09
	Cole Escovedo	def.	Joe Martin	Submission (Flying Triangle Choke)	1	1:05
	Justin Levens	def.	Jorge Oliveira	KO (Slam)	1	0:00
	Antonio Banuelos	def.	Ed Tomaselli	TKO (Cut)	1	2:25
	Scott Smith	def.	Tim McKenzie	TKO (Punches)	1	2:25
	Gil Castillo	def.	Steve Ramirez	TKO (Punches)	2	4:01
	Shane Carwin	def.	Carlton Jones	TKO (Submission to punches)	1	2:11
	Kenny Ento	def.	Charles Price	Submission (Armbar)	1	1:19
	Andrew Martinez	def.	Jimmy Dexter	DQ (Knee to the Head on the Ground)	1	1:12

== See also ==
- World Extreme Cagefighting
- List of World Extreme Cagefighting champions
- List of WEC events
