= 2006 in WEC =

World Extreme Cagefighting events

Information
- First date: January 13, 2006
- Last date: October 12, 2006

Events
- Total events: 7

Fights
- Total fights: 74
- Title fights: 11

Chronology
2005 in WEC	2006 in WEC	2007 in WEC

The year 2006 was the 6th year in the history of World Extreme Cagefighting, a mixed martial arts promotion based in the United States. In 2006 WEC held 7 events beginning with, WEC 18: Unfinished Business.

== Title fights ==
Title fights in 2006
Weight class				Method	Round	Time	Event	Notes
Heavyweight	Brian Olsen	def.	Lavar Johnson	Submission (Knee Injury)	2	0:14	WEC 18: Unfinished Business	(Note: For the WEC Heavyweight Championship.)
Welterweight	Mike Pyle (c)	def.	Shonie Carter	Submission (Triangle Choke)	1	2:06	WEC 18: Unfinished Business	(Note: For the WEC Welterweight Championship.)
Light Heavyweight	Scott Smith (c)	def.	Justin Levens	KO (Punches)	1	1:58	WEC 18: Unfinished Business	(Note: For the WEC Light Heavyweight Championship.)
Featherweight	Urijah Faber	def.	Cole Escovedo	TKO (Corner Stoppage)	2	5:00	WEC 19: Undisputed	(Note: For the WEC Featherweight Championship.)
Lightweight	Hermes Franca	def.	Gabe Ruediger (c)	KO (Punches)	1	0:36	WEC 19: Undisputed	(Note: For the WEC Lightweight Championship.)
Heavyweight	Brian Olsen (c)	def.	Mike Kyle	DQ (Strikes After the Bell)	1	N/A	WEC 20: Cinco de Mayhem	(Note: For the WEC Heavyweight Championship.)
Light Heavyweight	Lodune Sincaid	def.	Dan Molina	Submission (Rear-Naked Choke)	1	3:17	WEC 20: Cinco de Mayhem	(Note: For the WEC Light Heavyweight Championship.)
Bantamweight	Eddie Wineland	def.	Antonio Banuelos	KO (Head Kick and Punches)	1	2:36	WEC 20: Cinco de Mayhem	(Note: For the WEC Bantamweight Championship.)
Lightweight	Hermes Franca (c)	def.	Brandon Olsen	Submission (Armbar)	1	0:40	WEC 21: Tapout	(Note: For the WEC Lightweight Championship.)
Light Heavyweight	Doug Marshall	def.	Lodune Sincaid (c)	TKO (Punches)	2	0:51	WEC 23: Hot August Fights	(Note: For the WEC Light Heavyweight Championship.)
Lightweight	Hermes Franca (c)	def.	Nate Diaz	Submission (Armbar)	2	2:46	WEC 24: Full Force	(Note: For the WEC Lightweight Championship.)

== Events list ==
No.	Event	Date	Venue	Location	Attendance
24	WEC 24: Full Force	October 12, 2006	Tachi Palace Hotel & Casino	Lemoore, California	
23	WEC 23: Hot August Fights	August 17, 2006	Tachi Palace Hotel & Casino	Lemoore, California	
22	WEC 22: The Hitmen	July 8, 2006	Tachi Palace Hotel & Casino	Lemoore, California	
21	WEC 21: Tapout	June 15, 2006	San Manuel Indian Bingo and Casino	Highland, California	
20	WEC 20: Cinco de Mayhem	May 5, 2006	Tachi Palace Hotel & Casino	Lemoore, California	
19	WEC 19: Undisputed	March 17, 2006	Tachi Palace Hotel & Casino	Lemoore, California	
18	WEC 18: Unfinished Business	January 13, 2006	Tachi Palace Hotel & Casino	Lemoore, California	

== WEC 18: Unfinished Business ==
WEC 18: Unfinished Business
- Promotion: World Extreme Cagefighting
- Date: January 13, 2006
- Venue: Tachi Palace Hotel & Casino
- City: Lemoore, California

Event chronology
WEC 17: Halloween Fury 4	WEC 18: Unfinished Business	WEC 19: Undisputed

WEC 18: Unfinished Business was an event held on January 13, 2006 at the Tachi Palace in Lemoore, California, United States.

=== Results ===
Main Card
Weight class				Method	Round	Time	Notes
Heavyweight	Brian Olsen	def.	Lavar Johnson	TKO (Knee Injury)	2	0:14	(Note: For the WEC Heavyweight Championship.)
	Vernon White	def.	Jason Guida	TKO (Doctor Stoppage)	1	5:00
	Billy Evangelista	def.	Ryan Healy	TKO (Punches and Elbows)	2	2:06
	Casey Olson	def.	Joe Martin	Decision (Unanimous)	3	5:00
Welterweight	Mike Pyle (c)	def.	Shonie Carter	Submission (Triangle Choke)	1	2:06	(Note: For the WEC Welterweight Championship.)
Light Heavyweight	Scott Smith (c)	def.	Justin Levens	KO (Punches)	1	1:58	(Note: For the WEC Light Heavyweight Championship.)
	Chris Lytle	def.	Savant Young	TKO (Submission to elbows)	1	3:50
	Rich Crunkilton	def.	Nick Ertl	TKO (Punches)	2	3:55
	Devin Cole	def.	Mike Kyle	TKO (Punches)	2	2:56
	Josh Green	vs.	Rafael del Real	No Contest - Unintentional Knee	1	3:26

== WEC 19: Undisputed ==
WEC 19: Undisputed was an event held on March 17, 2006 at the Tachi Palace in Lemoore, California, United States.

=== Results ===
Main Card
Weight class				Method	Round	Time	Notes
Featherweight	Urijah Faber	def.	Cole Escovedo	TKO (Corner Stoppage)	2	5:00	(Note: For the WEC Featherweight Championship.)
Light Heavyweight	Tim McKenzie	def.	Doug Marshall	TKO (Punches and Elbows)	1	3:35
Catchweight (175 lb)	Joe Martin	def.	Tony Alanis	Submission (Heel Hook)	2	2:26
Light Heavyweight	Lodune Sincaid	def.	James Irvin	Decision (Unanimous)	3	5:00
Bantamweight	Antonio Banuelos	def.	James Cottrell	Decision (Unanimous)	3	5:00
Undercard bouts (aired on HDNet)
Lightweight	Hermes Franca	def.	Gabe Ruediger (c)	KO (Punches)	1	0:36	(Note: For the WEC Lightweight Championship.)
Lightweight	Rob McCullough	def.	Olaf Alfonso	KO (Punch)	2	0:12
Welterweight	Pat Healy	def.	Tiki Ghosn	TKO (Shoulder Injury)	3	0:25
Lightweight	Ryan Healy	def.	Phillip Wyman	Submission (Rear-Naked Choke)	1	3:18
Heavyweight	Jake O'Brien	def.	Jay White	KO (Punch)	1	0:14
Middleweight	Kenny Ento	def.	Jimmy Dexter	Submission (Armbar)	1	1:20	(Note: This bout was not aired on the broadcast.)

== WEC 20: Cinco de Mayhem ==
WEC 20: Cinco de Mayhem was an event held on May 5, 2006 at the Tachi Palace in Lemoore, California, United States.

=== Results ===
Main Card
Weight class				Method	Round	Time	Notes
Heavyweight	Brian Olsen (c)	def.	Mike Kyle	DQ (Strikes After the Bell)	1	N/A	(Note: For the WEC Heavyweight Championship.)
Light Heavyweight	Lodune Sincaid	def.	Dan Molina	Submission (Rear-Naked Choke)	1	3:17	(Note: For the WEC Light Heavyweight Championship.)
Lightweight	Cory Cass	def.	Poppies Martinez	Submission (Armbar)	1	0:47
Light Heavyweight	Glover Teixeira	def.	Carlton Jones	TKO (Punches)	1	1:57
Light Heavyweight	Jeremy Freitag	def.	Paul Moreno	Submission (Armbar)	1	2:22
Middleweight	Kenny Ento	def.	Phil Collins	Submission (Armbar)	1	1:07
Bantamweight	Eddie Wineland	def.	Antonio Banuelos	KO (Head Kick and Punches)	1	2:36	(Note: For the WEC Bantamweight Championship.)
Lightweight	Rob McCullough	def.	Randy Hauer	TKO (Punches)	1	2:36
Lightweight	Nate Diaz	def.	Gilbert Rael	TKO (Punches)	1	3:35
Lightweight	Cassio Werneck	def.	Ashe Bowman	Submission (Armbar)	2	3:05
Middleweight	Fernando Gonzalez	def.	Jimmy Dexter	Submission (Rear-Naked Choke)	1	4:09
Middleweight	Keith Berry	def.	Donny Rider	TKO (Punches)	1	0:36

== WEC 21: Tapout ==
WEC 21: Tapout was an event held on June 15, 2006 at the San Manuel Indian Bingo and Casino in Highland, California.

=== Results ===
Main Card
Weight class				Method	Round	Time	Notes
Lightweight	Rob McCullough	def.	Ryan Healy	TKO (Cut)	1	1:52
Lightweight	Nate Diaz	def.	Joe Hurley	Submission (Triangle Choke)	2	2:03
Lightweight	Hermes Franca (c)	def.	Brandon Olsen	Submission (Armbar)	1	0:40	(Note: For the WEC Lightweight Championship.)
Heavyweight	Justin Eilers	def.	Jimmy Ambriz	TKO (Doctor Stoppage)	1	5:00
Light Heavyweight	Brian Stann	def.	Miguel Cosio	TKO (Punches)	1	0:16
Lightweight	Rich Crunkilton	def.	Adam Lynn	Submission (Rear Naked Choke)	2	1:20
Welterweight	Mike Penalber	def.	Joe Martin	Decision (Split)	3	3:00
Heavyweight	Kyle York	def.	Jason Glaza	TKO (Punches)	1	0:46

== WEC 22: The Hitmen ==
WEC 22: The Hitmen was an event held on July 8, 2006 at the Tachi Palace in Lemoore, California, United States.

=== Results ===
Main Card
Weight class				Method	Round	Time	Notes
Lightweight	Mike Joy	def.	Robert Densley	Submission (Armbar)	1	4:58
Catchweight (208 lbs)	Doug Marshall	def.	Jeff Terry	TKO (Punches)	1	1:50
Catchweight (178 lbs)	J.T. Taylor	def.	Drew Dimanlig	Submission (Armbar)	1	3:47
Light heavyweight	Alex Stiebling	def.	Jason Guida	Decision (Unanimous)	3	5:00
Heavyweight	Wes Sims	def.	Joel Suprenant	Submission (Triangle Choke)	1	0:28
Welterweight	Patrick Murphy	def.	Joel Thomas	Decision (Unanimous)	3	5:00
Featherweight	Trevor Harris	def.	Colley Bradford	Submission (Rear-Naked Choke)	1	2:19
Welterweight	Jonathan Mix	def.	Mario Rivera	Submission (Rear-Naked Choke)	3	3:47
Light heavyweight	Glover Teixeira	def.	Jack Morrison	Submission (Rear-Naked Choke)	1	1:27
Catchweight (178 lbs)	Poppies Martinez	def.	Troy Miller	Submission (Armbar)	1	0:50
Lightweight	Casey Olson	def.	Alvin Cacdac	TKO (Punches)	1	2:28

== WEC 23: Hot August Fights ==
WEC 23: Hot August Fights was an event held on August 17, 2006 at the Tachi Palace in Lemoore, California, United States.

=== Results ===
Main Card
Weight class				Method	Round	Time	Notes
Light Heavyweight	Doug Marshall	def.	Lodune Sincaid (c)	TKO (Punches)	2	0:51	(Note: For the WEC Light Heavyweight Championship.)
Featherweight	Antonio Banuelos	def.	Cole Escovedo	Decision (Unanimous)	3	5:00
Welterweight	John Alessio	def.	Alex Serdyukov	Submission (Rear-Naked Choke)	3	1:52
Welterweight	Alex Karalexis	def.	Thomas Denny	Decision (Unanimous)	3	5:00
Lightweight	Poppies Martinez	def.	Gigo Jara	Submission (Rear-Naked Choke)	2	3:52
Middleweight	Kenny Ento	def.	Mario Rivera	Submission (Armbar)	1	2:44
Lightweight	Casey Olson	def.	Chris Solomon	Decision (Unanimous)	3	5:00
Middleweight	Fernando Gonzalez	def.	Alex Stiebling	TKO (Doctor Stoppage)	1	2:35
Light Heavyweight	Anthony Ruiz	def.	Jeremy Freitag	TKO (Punches)	2	2:46
Lightweight	Clay Guida	def.	Joe Martin	Decision (Unanimous)	3	5:00
Light Heavyweight	Dan Molina	def.	Rafael del Real	Submission (Heel Hook)	1	0:43
Welterweight	Josh McDonald	def.	Patrick Murphy	Decision (Majority)	3	5:00
Lightweight	Robert Breslin	vs.	Andrew Martinez	Draw	2	5:00

== WEC 24: Full Force ==
WEC 24: Full Force was an event held on October 12, 2006 at the Tachi Palace in Lemoore, California, United States.

=== Results ===
Main Card
Weight class				Method	Round	Time	Notes
Lightweight	Hermes Franca (c)	def.	Nate Diaz	Submission (Armbar)	2	2:46	(Note: For the WEC Lightweight Championship.)
Light Heavyweight	Terry Martin	def.	Keith Berry	TKO (Punches)	1	2:52
Lightweight	John Polakowski	def.	Olaf Alfonso	Decision (Split)	3	5:00
Heavyweight	Justin Eilers	def.	Josh Diekmann	TKO (Punches)	1	2:29
Lightweight	Poppies Martinez	def.	Robert Breslin	Submission (Guillotine Choke)	1	0:52
Light Heavyweight	Glover Teixeira	def.	Rameau Thierry Sokoudjou	KO (Punches)	1	1:41
Light Heavyweight	Justin Levens	def.	Justin Hawes	TKO (Punches and Elbows)	1	1:28
Welterweight	Dave Terrel	def.	Mike Moreno	Decision (Unanimous)	3	5:00
Light Heavyweight	Patrick Kaase	def.	Jarrod Kwitty	TKO (Punches)	2	2:30

== See also ==
- List of World Extreme Cagefighting champions
- List of WEC events
