= WEC 16 =

WEC MMA events in 2005

WEC 16: Clash of the Titans 2
- Promotion: World Extreme Cagefighting
- Date: August 18, 2005
- Venue: Tachi Palace Hotel & Casino
- City: Lemoore, California

Event chronology
WEC 15: Judgment Day	WEC 16: Clash of the Titans 2	WEC 17: Halloween Fury 4

WEC 16: Clash of the Titans 2 was a mixed martial arts event promoted by World Extreme Cagefighting on August 18, 2005, at the Tachi Palace Hotel & Casino in Lemoore, California. The main event saw Ron Waterman take on Ricco Rodriguez for the WEC Super Heavyweight Championship.

== Results ==
Main Card
Weight class				Method	Round	Time	Notes
Super Heavyweight	Ron Waterman (c)	def.	Ricco Rodriguez	Decision (Unanimous)	3	5:00	(Note: For the WEC Super Heavyweight Championship.)
Middleweight	Alex Serdyukov (c)	def.	Victor Parfenov	TKO (Punches)	1	2:20	(Note: For the WEC North American Middleweight Championship.)
	Tosh Cook	def.	Troy Miller	Submission (Rear Naked Choke)	1	1:45
	Chris Sanford	def.	Josh Green	Submission (Guillotine Choke)	1	2:30
	Rafael del Real	def.	Jody Poff	No Contest	1	0:00
	Steve Ramirez	def.	Jason Biswell	TKO (Punches)	1	2:01
	Casey Olson	def.	Rolland Parli	TKO (Punches)	1	4:58
	Kenny Ento	def.	Chris Botelho	Submission (Armbar)	1	4:33
	Ernie Tiserino	def.	Van Palacio	Submission (Keylock)	3	2:48
	Allan Weickert	def.	Rocky Batastini	Submission (Armbar)	2	2:50
	Dan Marks	def.	Walt Hughes	Submission (Armbar)	2	2:22

== See also ==
- World Extreme Cagefighting
- List of World Extreme Cagefighting champions
- List of WEC events
- 2005 in WEC
