= Andre Roberts =

Andre Roberts may refer to:

- Andre Roberts (fighter) (born 1965)
- Andre Roberts (American football) (born 1988)
