= Lavar Johnson =

American mixed martial artist

- Born: June 11, 1977 (age 49); Madera, California, United States
- Other names: Big
- Height: 6 ft 3 in (191 cm)
- Weight: 253 lb (115 kg; 18 st 1 lb)
- Division: Heavyweight
- Reach: 81 in (206 cm)
- Stance: Orthodox
- Fighting out of: Fresno, California, United States
- Team: JL3 Elite; AKA
- Years active: 2004–2006, 2008–2014 (MMA)

Mixed martial arts record
- Total: 28
- Wins: 18
- By knockout: 17
- By submission: 1
- Losses: 10
- By knockout: 2
- By submission: 7
- By decision: 1

Other information
- Mixed martial arts record from Sherdog

Lavar Johnson (born June 11, 1977) is an American bare-knuckle boxer and former Heavyweight mixed martial artist. A professional from 2004 until 2014, he competed for the UFC, the WEC, Strikeforce and Bellator MMA.

== Background ==
Johnson is from Madera, California and was a star football player, attending Madera High School where a coach nicknamed Johnson "Black Superman." Johnson then continued his career excelling as an outside linebacker and strong safety at Merced College before playing at the semi-professional level. Johnson competed in Toughman Contests and dominated, leading him to transition into professional mixed martial arts.

== Mixed martial arts career ==
=== World Extreme Cagefighting ===
Johnson made his professional mixed martial arts debut in the WEC on January 16, 2004, losing to future WEC Light Heavyweight Champion Doug Marshall via TKO (corner stoppage). The bout was somewhat marred by controversy as Johnson was on the receiving end of four low blows over the course of the bout, which was eventually stopped due to exhaustion on his part. Johnson had entered the bout without any training or preparation beyond hitting a heavy bag. He next defeated Levi Thornbrue via TKO (punches). He knocked out Fred Diaz with punches at WEC 11: Evolution. Johnson then fought twice outside of WEC, winning both bouts via first round stoppage. He returned to face Corey Salter at WEC 17: Halloween Fury 4, making him submit to strikes in the first round. In Johnson's final WEC fight, he lost to the final WEC Heavyweight Champion Brian Olsen via submission due to a knee injury.

After the loss to Olsen, and because of the knee injury sustained during that loss, Johnson briefly left mixed martial arts to become a delivery driver for Budweiser. Johnson claimed that the cost of his medical expenses, coupled with his inability to train and fight, because of his injury, necessitated that he go get a "real" job. He returned to fighting after a two-and a-half year layoff, with a submission loss to Alijah Reni.

He went on to defeat his next four opponents via first round stoppage, before being signed by Strikeforce.

=== Strikeforce ===
Johnson made his Strikeforce debut against Carl Seumanutafa at Strikeforce Challengers: Evangelista vs. Aina, knocking him out with a punch 18 seconds into the first round. Johnson knocked out Seumanutafa with an uppercut while Seumanutafa was going for a takedown.

Johnson was shot on July 4, 2009, while at a family reunion. Johnson was rumored to return to action at Strikeforce Challengers: Kaufman vs. Hashi, facing Lolohea Mahe. The match was instead moved to Strikeforce Challengers: Johnson vs. Mahe, as the main event. Johnson won by TKO due to punches in the second round.

He next faced current Bellator fighter Virgil Zwicker at Strikeforce Challengers: Bowling vs. Voelker, knocking him out with punches in the first round.

Johnson fought in a Strikeforce Heavyweight Grand Prix Tournament alternate match, submitting to Shane Del Rosario's armbar in the first round.

Johnson's next fight came against former Louisiana State University football player, Shawn Jordan at Strikeforce Challengers: Larkin vs. Rossborough. Johnson lost via submission to an Americana in the second round. Afterwards, he took time off to heal injuries to his right elbow and left knee.

=== Ultimate Fighting Championship ===
Johnson made his UFC debut on January 28, 2012, defeating Joey Beltran via first-round KO at UFC on Fox: Evans vs. Davis. This earned him the Knockout of the Night bonus award.

Johnson returned just over three months later for his second UFC fight, defeating fan-favorite Pat Barry via first-round TKO at UFC on Fox 3. For this, he was awarded his second consecutive Knockout of the Night bonus.

Johnson replaced an injured Mark Hunt on ten days' notice and was defeated by Stefan Struve on the main card of UFC 146 via submission due to an armbar in the first round.

Johnson was expected to face Brendan Schaub on December 8, 2012, at UFC on Fox 5. However, Johnson was forced out of the bout with a groin injury and Schaub was pulled from the card altogether.

Johnson/Schaub eventually took place on February 23, 2013, at UFC 157. Johnson lost the fight via unanimous decision. Johnson was subsequently released from the organization after a post fight drug screening revealed elevated levels of testosterone. His fighting license was suspended by the California State Athletic Commission till November 23, 2013. Johnson admitted he was undergoing testosterone replacement therapy and had not disclosed this on his pre-fight medical questionnaire.

=== Bellator MMA ===
Following his release from the UFC, Johnson signed with Bellator MMA. He debuted on October 4, 2013, in the heavyweight tournament against Vinicius Queiroz at Bellator 102. In a surprising upset, Johnson was stopped by one punch just 23 seconds into the fight, marking the first time he had been knocked out in his career.

Johnson returned to the Bellator cage in March 2014 as a participant in the Bellator Season Ten Heavyweight Tournament. He faced Ryan Martinez in the opening round at Bellator 111 on March 7, 2014. He won the fight via knockout in the first round. Johnson faced Blagoy Ivanov in the semifinals at Bellator 116 on April 11, 2014. He lost the back-and-forth bout via submission in the first round.

Johnson faced Cheick Kongo on September 5, 2014, at Bellator 123. He lost the fight via rear-naked choke submission in the first round.

== Bare-knuckle boxing ==
=== Valor Bare Knuckle ===
On September 21, 2019, Johnson returned to professional fighting via bare-knuckle boxing, defeating former UFC and Ultimate Fighter veteran James McSweeney via first-round TKO at Valor Bare Knuckle 1.

=== Bare Knuckle Fighting Championship ===
Johnson was scheduled to face Rashad Coulter followed by Bobby Brents on November 23, 2024, at BKFC Fight Night 18. However, both Coulter and Brents withdrew for unknown reasons and was replaced by Anthony Garrett. Johnson lost by knockout 12 seconds into the first round.

== Personal life ==
Johnson has two sons.

=== Legal issues ===
In 2007, Johnson was sentenced to 14 days of jail and three years of probation as well as ordered to undergo alcohol counselling after pleading not guilty to a misdemeanor charges of corporal injury on a spouse/co-habitant. He was then jailed for 30 days for criminal threats and disobeying a domestic relations court order.

On July 5, 2008, at approximately midnight, Johnson was shot (along with four others, one fatally) at a family reunion in Bakersfield, California. According to reports released by the Bakersfield Police Department, a male in his late teens approached Johnson and the other victims as they were gathering in the front yard during a family reunion/Independence Day celebration and opened fire on the crowd at random, shooting five people. Johnson was shot in the hip, the forearm, and the third bullet fired at him hit his abdomen, which was the most serious injury. Johnson's American Kickboxing Academy trainer, Bob Cook, told Sherdog.com shortly afterwards that Johnson was between serious and critical condition. Cook stated he believed Johnson had been struck twice, once in the abdomen and once in the chest. His appendix was removed and he could not eat or drink for a month after the surgery which sewed his stomach closed. In August 2008, Johnson was released from hospital, and was said to be doing well and hoping to return to training as soon as possible. A fifteen-year-old girl was later arrested in connection to the shooting. Johnson has a scar up and down his torso as a result of the surgery and his cousin, Anthony, who was from Jacksonville, Texas was the casualty.

On August 25, 2015, Johnson was arrested in Fresno, California and charged with corporal injury on a spouse/cohabitant, assault by means likely to produce great bodily injury, dissuading a witness from reporting a crime and dissuading a witness by force. He had allegedly repeatedly punched, kneed and slammed his girlfriend on August 11, before fleeing the scene. He was in Fresno County Jail with bail set at $175,000. He pled not guilty to all charges, which carry a maximum sentence of 10 years and eight months in prison. On April 29, 2016, Johnson was sentenced to five years in prison for the August 2015 assault.

== Championships and accomplishments ==
- War Gods MMA
  - War Gods Heavyweight Championship (One time)
- Ultimate Fighting Championship
  - Knockout Of The Night (Two times)

== Mixed martial arts record ==
Professional record breakdown
| 28 matches | 18 wins | 10 losses |
| By knockout | 17 | 2 |
| By submission | 1 | 7 |
| By decision | 0 | 1 |

| Res. | Record | Opponent | Method | Event | Date | Round | Time | Location | Notes |
|---|---|---|---|---|---|---|---|---|---|
| Loss | 18–10 | Cheick Kongo | Submission (rear-naked choke) | Bellator 123 | September 5, 2014 | 1 | 3:27 | Uncasville, Connecticut, United States | |
| Loss | 18–9 | Blagoy Ivanov | Submission (americana) | Bellator 116 | April 11, 2014 | 1 | 4:08 | Temecula, California, United States | Bellator Season Ten Heavyweight Tournament Semifinal |
| Win | 18–8 | Ryan Martinez | TKO (punches) | Bellator 111 | March 7, 2014 | 1 | 4:22 | Thackerville, Oklahoma, United States | Bellator Season Ten Heavyweight Tournament Quarterfinal |
| Loss | 17–8 | Vinicius Queiroz | KO (punch) | Bellator 102 | October 4, 2013 | 1 | 0:23 | Visalia, California, United States | |
| Loss | 17–7 | Brendan Schaub | Decision (unanimous) | UFC 157 | February 23, 2013 | 3 | 5:00 | Anaheim, California, United States | Tested positive for elevated levels of testosterone. |
| Loss | 17–6 | Stefan Struve | Submission (armbar) | UFC 146 | May 26, 2012 | 1 | 1:05 | Las Vegas, Nevada, United States | |
| Win | 17–5 | Pat Barry | TKO (punches) | UFC on Fox: Diaz vs. Miller | May 5, 2012 | 1 | 4:38 | East Rutherford, New Jersey, United States | Knockout of the Night. |
| Win | 16–5 | Joey Beltran | KO (punches) | UFC on Fox: Evans vs. Davis | January 28, 2012 | 1 | 4:24 | Chicago, Illinois, United States | Knockout of the Night. |
| Loss | 15–5 | Shawn Jordan | Submission (americana) | Strikeforce Challengers: Larkin vs. Rossborough | September 23, 2011 | 2 | 3:08 | Las Vegas, Nevada, United States | |
| Loss | 15–4 | Shane del Rosario | Submission (armbar) | Strikeforce: Fedor vs. Silva | February 12, 2011 | 1 | 4:31 | East Rutherford, New Jersey, United States | Strikeforce Heavyweight Grand Prix Reserve Bout. |
| Win | 15–3 | Virgil Zwicker | KO (punches) | Strikeforce Challengers: Bowling vs. Voelker | October 22, 2010 | 1 | 2:17 | Fresno, California, United States | |
| Win | 14–3 | Lolohea Mahe | TKO (punches) | Strikeforce Challengers: Johnson vs. Mahe | March 26, 2010 | 2 | 3:29 | Fresno, California, United States | |
| Win | 13–3 | Carl Seumanutafa | KO (punch) | Strikeforce Challengers: Evangelista vs. Aina | May 15, 2009 | 1 | 0:18 | Fresno, California, United States | |
| Win | 12–3 | Dave Huckaba | TKO (corner stoppage) | PFC 12: High Stakes | January 22, 2009 | 1 | 3:00 | Lemoore, California, United States | Huckaba refused to answer bell for second round. |
| Win | 11–3 | Sean Souza | KO (punch) | War Gods: Do or Die | November 8, 2008 | 1 | 2:51 | Fresno, California, United States | Won War Gods Heavyweight Championship. |
| Win | 10–3 | Vince Lucero | KO (punch) | PFC 10: Explosive | September 26, 2008 | 1 | 1:16 | Lemoore, California, United States | |
| Win | 9–3 | Sal Farnetti | TKO (punches) | PFC: Bias vs. Blood | August 21, 2008 | 1 | 2:14 | Lemoore, California, United States | |
| Loss | 8–3 | Alijah Reni | Submission (rear-naked choke) | War Gods | July 26, 2008 | 1 | 1:31 | Fresno, California, United States | |
| Loss | 8–2 | Brian Olsen | Submission (knee injury) | WEC 18 | January 13, 2006 | 2 | 0:14 | Lemoore, California, United States | For the vacant WEC Heavyweight Championship. |
| Win | 8–1 | Corey Salter | TKO (submission to strikes) | WEC 17 | October 14, 2005 | 1 | 3:37 | Lemoore, California, United States | |
| Win | 7–1 | Todd Gouwenberg | TKO (punches) | Freedom Fight: Canada vs USA | July 9, 2005 | 3 | 2:53 | Hull, Quebec, Canada | |
| Win | 6–1 | Carlos Garcia | TKO (punches) | WEC 15 | May 19, 2005 | 1 | 1:09 | Lemoore, California, United States | |
| Win | 5–1 | Lace Pele | TKO (punches) | GC 33: Brutal Force | December 12, 2004 | 1 | 0:54 | Porterville, California, United States | |
| Win | 4–1 | Terry Pettek | Submission (guillotine choke) | Venom: First Strike | September 18, 2004 | 1 | 0:21 | Huntington Beach, California, United States | |
| Win | 3–1 | Fred Diaz | KO (punches) | WEC 11 | August 20, 2004 | 1 | 1:33 | Lemoore, California, United States | |
| Win | 2–1 | Kyle Keeney | KO (punches) | Lords of the Cage | June 5, 2004 | 1 | 1:36 | Anacortes, Washington, United States | |
| Win | 1–1 | Levi Thornbrue | TKO (punches) | WEC 10 | May 21, 2004 | 1 | 2:32 | Lemoore, California, United States | |
| Loss | 0–1 | Doug Marshall | TKO (corner stoppage) | WEC 9 | January 16, 2004 | 1 | 5:00 | Lemoore, California, United States | Stoppage due to exhaustion. |

== Bare-knuckle boxing ==
Professional record breakdown
| 3 matches | 2 wins | 1 loss |
| By knockout | 2 | 1 |

| Res. | Record | Opponent | Method | Event | Date | Round | Time | Location | Notes |
|---|---|---|---|---|---|---|---|---|---|
| Loss | 2–1 | Anthony Garrett | KO (punch) | BKFC Fight Night Los Angeles: Warr vs. Khanakov | November 23, 2024 | 1 | 0:12 | Los Angeles, California, United States | |
| Win | 2–0 | Travis Wiuff | KO (punch) | Valor Bare Knuckle 2 | October 27, 2023 | 1 | 1:21 | Jacksonville, Florida, United States | |
| Win | 1–0 | James McSweeney | KO (punch) | Valor Bare Knuckle 1 | September 21, 2019 | 1 | 0:27 | New Town, North Dakota, United States | |
