= Dan Christison =

American MMA fighter

- Born: April 26, 1972 (age 54); Los Angeles, California, United States
- Other names: The Sandman
- Height: 6 ft 8 in (2.03 m)
- Weight: 265 lb (120 kg; 18.9 st)
- Division: Super Heavyweight; Heavyweight
- Reach: 85 in (216 cm)
- Fighting out of: Albuquerque, New Mexico
- Team: Jackson's Mixed Martial Arts
- Years active: 2001–2010

Mixed martial arts record
- Total: 27
- Wins: 20
- By knockout: 8
- By submission: 12
- Losses: 7
- By knockout: 1
- By decision: 6

Other information
- Mixed martial arts record from Sherdog

Daniel Bernard "The Sandman" Christison (born April 26, 1972) is a retired American mixed martial artist. A professional from 2001 until 2010, he fought for the San Jose Razorclaws of the International Fight League, the Ultimate Fighting Championship, WEC, and was also a cast member on the second season of The Ultimate Fighter as part of Team Hughes. He is the former WEC Super Heavyweight Champion.

== Background ==
Christison was born and raised in Los Angeles, California and had a rough upbringing which fueled his interest to begin mixed martial arts. He studied traditional Chinese martial arts before learning Brazilian jiu-jitsu and then transitioned into mixed martial arts. He can claim both Hispanic and Native American ancestry.

== Mixed martial arts career ==
At 6'8" and 265 lbs, Christison was a Heavyweight who fought chiefly with a submission wrestling style. Christison fought out of Albuquerque, New Mexico. Christison became a contestant on the second season of The Ultimate Fighter after Kerry Schall was forced to withdraw due to injury (Christison's dramatic submission win over Ben Rothwell at Euphoria 3 in Atlantic City on February 26, 2005 is widely cited as the reason for Christison being chosen to replace Schall). Nicknamed "Big Dan" (a nickname given to him by Dana White during the show) Christison and Dan "The Sandman" Christison, he lost his first fight on the show, a quarterfinal match with Seth Petruzelli in which Christison lost by unanimous decision after he had inadvertently kicked Petruzelli twice in the groin area.

Christison was member of Team Hughes on TUF 2. Along with fellow former Ultimate Fighter competitors Keith Jardine, Joe Stevenson and Rashad Evans, he trained in Albuquerque under the instruction of coach Greg Jackson.

Christison was 0-6 lifetime in fights that went to a decision (not counting the loss to Petruzelli which is officially classed as an exhibition bout) and 20-1 in fights that were decided by knockout or submission (the lone loss coming via a doctor stoppage).

Christison and his wife, the former Kyria McBrayer, have (as of July 2024) a 13 year-old son, (John) Rylan. The family resides in Dale, Indiana, near where Mrs. Christison was born and raised.

== Championships and accomplishments ==
- Ultimate Fighting Championship
  - Fight of the Night (One time) vs. Brad Imes
  - Submission of the Night (One time) vs. Brad Imes
  - UFC.com Awards
    - 2006: Ranked #8 Submission of the Year & Ranked #9 Fight of the Year vs. Brad Imes

== Mixed martial arts record ==
Professional record breakdown
27 matches	20 wins	7 losses
By knockout	8	1
By submission	12	0
By decision	0	6

Res.	Record	Opponent	Method	Event	Date	Round	Time	Location	Notes
Win	20–7	Mike Wessel	Submission (kimura)	CFC 4: Wessel vs. Christison	February 26, 2010	3	3:56	Winnipeg, Manitoba, Canada	
Win	19–7	Rodrigo Munduruca	KO (punches)	Canadian Fighting Championship 3	November 14, 2009	2	0:18	Winnipeg, Manitoba, Canada	
Win	18–7	Jim Davis	TKO (submission to punches)	ICF: Intimidation Cage Fighting 17	October 31, 2009	1	2:21	Florence, Kentucky, United States	
Win	17–7	Joel Traves	TKO (punches)	Steele Cage MMA: Battle of the Texas Titans	June 11, 2009	1	2:16	Frisco, Texas, United States	
Loss	16–7	Márcio Cruz	Decision (unanimous)	ICF: Breakout	April 11, 2009	3	5:00	Cincinnati, Ohio, United States	
Win	16–6	Brion Peoples	TKO (submission to punches)	ICF: Turfwar	March 14, 2009	1	0:36	Florence, Kentucky, United States	
Win	15–6	Steve Banks	Submission (omoplata)	Intimidation Cage Fighting: Redemption	November 22, 2008	1	4:29	Florence, Kentucky, United States	
Win	14–6	Nedius Huitt	TKO (submission to punches)	ICF: Vendetta	October 25, 2008	1	0:45	Florence, Kentucky, United States	
Win	13–6	Charles McVey	KO (punches)	Warrior MMA: Consequences	September 13, 2008	1	1:46	Elizabethtown, Kentucky, United States	
Win	12–6	Sam Holloway	Submission (armbar)	AFL: Bulletproof	May 30, 2008	1	0:50	Atlanta, Georgia, United States	
Win	11–6	John LeBlanc	TKO (punches)	AFL: Eruption	March 7, 2008	2	4:02	Lexington, Kentucky, United States	
Win	10–6	Derek Sawyer	TKO (punches)	RFL: Revolution Fight League I	December 1, 2007	1	0:50	Louisville, Kentucky, United States	
Win	9–6	Johnathon Wesson	Decision (unanimous)	RITC 103: USA vs Brazil	November 16, 2007	3	4:00	Fountain Hills, Arizona, United States	
Loss	8–6	Antoine Jaoude	Decision (unanimous)	IFL: Chicago	May 19, 2007	3	4:00	Chicago, Illinois, United States	
Loss	8–5	Krzysztof Soszynski	Decision (unanimous)	IFL: Los Angeles	March 17, 2007	3	4:00	Los Angeles, California, United States	
Loss	8–4	Frank Mir	Decision (unanimous)	UFC 61: Bitter Rivals	July 8, 2006	3	5:00	Las Vegas, Nevada, United States	
Win	8–3	Brad Imes	Submission (armbar)	UFC Fight Night 4	April 6, 2006	3	3:37	Las Vegas, Nevada, United States	Fight of the Night and Submission of the Night.
Win	7–3	Jimmy Ambriz	Submission (verbal)	IFC WC 19: Warriors Challenge 19	March 26, 2005	2	0:55	Sault Ste. Marie, Michigan, United States	
Win	6–3	Ben Rothwell	Submission (kimura)	Euphoria: USA vs World	February 26, 2005	3	0:57	Atlantic City, New Jersey, United States	
Win	5–3	Andre Roberts	Submission (armbar)	WEC 13	January 22, 2005	1	3:26	Lemoore, California, United States	Won the vacant WEC Super Heavyweight Championship.
Win	4–3	Lemuel Vincent	TKO (strikes)	KOTC: New Mexico	August 28, 2004	N/A	N/A	Albuquerque, New Mexico	
Win	3–3	Jimmy Westfall	TKO (punches)	POA: Pride of Albuquerque	April 10, 2004	1	1:18	Albuquerque, New Mexico	
Loss	2–3	Dan Severn	Decision (split)	KOTC 24: Mayhem	June 14, 2003	3	5:00	Albuquerque, New Mexico	
Loss	2–2	Eric Pele	TKO (strikes)	KOTC 23: Sin City	May 16, 2003	1	4:50	Las Vegas, Nevada, United States	For the vacant KOTC Super Heavyweight Championship.
Win	2–1	Albert Lopez	Submission (rear-naked choke)	Triple Threat: Fight Night 1	April 6, 2003	1	N/A	Albuquerque, New Mexico	
Loss	1–1	Dan Severn	Decision	AC 1: Aztec Challenge 1	September 6, 2002	3	5:00	Ciudad Juarez, Mexico	
Win	1–0	Gabe Beauperthy	Submission	GC 5: Rumble in the Rockies	August 19, 2001	N/A	N/A	Denver, Colorado, United States	
