= WEC 17 =

WEC MMA events in 2005

WEC 17: Halloween Fury 4
- Promotion: World Extreme Cagefighting
- Date: October 14, 2005
- Venue: Tachi Palace Hotel & Casino
- City: Lemoore, California

Event chronology
WEC 16: Clash of the Titans 2	WEC 17: Halloween Fury 4	WEC 18: Unfinished Business

WEC 17: Halloween Fury 4 was a mixed martial arts event promoted by World Extreme Cagefighting on October 14, 2005, at the Tachi Palace Hotel & Casino in Lemoore, California. A light heavyweight tournament was held with the winner being crowned the champion and given a deal with the UFC.

== Results ==
Main Card
Weight class				Method	Round	Time	Notes
Light Heavyweight	Scott Smith	def.	Tait Fletcher	TKO (Punches)	1	3:55	(Note: Tournament final for the WEC Light Heavyweight Championship.)
	Ricco Rodriguez	def.	Jimmy Ambriz	Submission (Punches)	1	4:13
	Lavar Johnson	def.	Corey Salter	Submission (Strikes)	1	3:37
Welterweight	Mike Pyle	def.	Bret Bergmark	Submission (Triangle Choke)	1	3:36	(Note: For the WEC Welterweight Championship.)
Lightweight	Gabe Ruediger (c)	def.	Sam Wells	Decision (Unanimous)	3	5:00	(Note: For the WEC Lightweight Championship.)
	Poppies Martinez	def.	Robert Breslin	No Contest - Martinez Kicked in Groin	1	0:00
	Vernon White	def.	Alex Stiebling	KO (Punch)	2	0:09
	Cole Escovedo	def.	Joe Martin	Submission (Flying Triangle Choke)	1	1:05
	Justin Levens	def.	Jorge Oliveira	KO (Slam)	1	3:41
	Antonio Banuelos	def.	Ed Tomaselli	TKO (Cut)	1	2:25
Light Heavyweight	Scott Smith	def.	Tim McKenzie	TKO (Punches)	1	2:25
	Gil Castillo	def.	Steve Ramirez	TKO (Punches)	2	4:01
	Shane Carwin	def.	Carlton Jones	Submission (Punches)	1	2:11
	Kenny Ento	def.	Charles Price	Submission (Armbar)	1	1:19
	Andrew Martinez	def.	Jimmy Dexter	DQ (Knee to the Head on the Ground)	1	1:12

=== Bracket ===
Semifinals
(United States)	Scott Smith	TKO
(United States)	Tim McKenzie	1
(United States)	Justin Levens ^{1}	KO
(Brazil)	Jorge Oliveira	1

Finals
(United States)	Scott Smith	TKO
(United States)	Tait Fletcher ^{2}	1

^{1}Justin Levens was forced to withdraw due to a shoulder injury. He was replaced by Vernon White.
^{2}Vernon White was forced to withdraw due to a hand injury. He was replaced by Tait Fletcher.

== See also ==
- World Extreme Cagefighting
- List of World Extreme Cagefighting champions
- List of WEC events
- 2005 in WEC
