= WEC 15 =

WEC MMA events in 2005

WEC 15: Judgment Day
- Promotion: World Extreme Cagefighting
- Date: May 19, 2005
- Venue: Tachi Palace Hotel & Casino
- City: Lemoore, California

Event chronology
WEC 14: Vengeance	WEC 15: Judgment Day	WEC 16: Clash of the Titans 2

WEC 15: Judgment Day was a mixed martial arts event promoted by World Extreme Cagefighting on May 19, 2005, at the Tachi Palace Hotel & Casino in Lemoore, California. The card featured the likes of Joe Riggs, Chris Lytle and James Irvin compete.

== Results ==
Main Card
Weight class				Method	Round	Time	Notes
Heavyweight	James Irvin (c)	def.	Doug Marshall	KO (Knee)	2	0:45	(Note: For the WEC Heavyweight Championship.)
Lightweight	Cole Escovedo	def.	Poppies Martinez	TKO (Leg Injury)	2	1:05	(Note: For the WEC Native American Lightweight Championship.)
Middleweight	Joe Riggs	def.	Rob Kimmons	Submission (Punches)	1	1:24	(Note: For the WEC Middleweight Championship.)
Welterweight	Chris Lytle	def.	Pat Healy	Decision (Split)	3	5:00
Heavyweight	Lavar Johnson	def.	Carlos Garcia	TKO (Punches)	1	1:09
Lightweight	Rich Crunkilton	def.	Paul Jenkins	KO (Punches)	2	2:36
Middleweight	Tony Alanis	def.	Johnny Fadella	TKO (Punches)	1	1:54
Middleweight	Steve Ramirez	def.	Anthony Gonzales	Submission (Rear-Naked Choke)	1	4:38
Light Heavyweight	Josh Green	def.	Miguel Cosio	Submission (Rear-Naked Choke)	1	0:39
Light Heavyweight	Justin Levens	def.	Tony Lopez	Submission (Rear-Naked Choke)	1	3:46
Welterweight	Cassio Werneck	def.	Toby Imada	Submission (Triangle Choke)	2	4:52
Welterweight	Thomas Schulte	def.	Raven Seymon	Submission (Triangle Choke)	1	1:29
Welterweight	Jay Hieron	def.	Adam Lynn	Decision (Unanimous)	3	5:00

== See also ==
- World Extreme Cagefighting
- List of World Extreme Cagefighting champions
- List of WEC events
- 2005 in WEC
