= WEC 13 =

WEC MMA events in 2005

WEC 13: Heavyweight Explosion
- Promotion: World Extreme Cagefighting
- Date: January 22, 2005
- Venue: Tachi Palace Hotel & Casino
- City: Lemoore, California

Event chronology
WEC 12: Halloween Fury 3	WEC 13: Heavyweight Explosion	WEC 14: Vengeance

WEC 13: Heavyweight Explosion was a mixed martial arts event promoted by World Extreme Cagefighting on January 22, 2005 at the Tachi Palace Hotel & Casino in Lemoore, California. The card featured a 4-man Heavyweight Tournament featuring Brandon Vera as well as single fights which saw the likes of Jason "The Punisher" Lambert, Brad Imes, and MMA legend "Mr. International" Shonie Carter compete.

== Results ==
Main Card
Weight class				Method	Round	Time	Notes
Super Heavyweight	Dan Christison	def.	Andre Roberts	Submission (Armbar)	1	3:26	(Note: For the WEC Native American Super Heavyweight Championship.)
Light Heavyweight	Jason Lambert	def.	Richard Montoya	Submission (Punches)	1	2:45	(Note: For the WEC Light Heavyweight Championship.)
Heavyweight	Brad Imes	def.	Lace Pele	Submission (Punches)	1	2:04
Light Heavyweight	Jorge Oliveira	def.	Shonie Carter	Decision (Unanimous)	3	5:00
Lightweight	Olaf Alfonso	def.	Chin Seng	KO	1	1:13
Heavyweight	Brandon Vera	def.	Mike Whitehead	TKO (Doctor Stoppage)	2	1:12	(Note: Tournament final.)
Heavyweight	Allan Weickert	def.	Jeremy Freitag	TKO	1	4:25
Heavyweight	Mike Whitehead	def.	Terroll Dees	Submission (Neck Crank)	1	3:43
Heavyweight	Brandon Vera	def.	Andre Mussi	KO (Knees and Punches)	1	0:51
Heavyweight	Jody Poff	def.	Houssain Oushani	Submission (Guillotine Choke)	1	1:51
Heavyweight	Van Palacio	def.	Fred Diaz	Decision (Split)	3	5:00

=== Bracket ===
Semifinals
(United States)	Brandon Vera	KO
(Brazil)	Andre Mussi	1
(United States)	Mike Whithead	SUB
(United States)	Terroll Dees	1

Finals
(United States)	Brandon Vera	TKO
(United States)	Mike Whitehead	2

== See also ==
- World Extreme Cagefighting
- List of World Extreme Cagefighting champions
- List of WEC events
- 2005 in WEC
