= WEC 21 =

WEC MMA events in 2006

WEC 21: Tapout
- Promotion: World Extreme Cagefighting
- Date: June 15, 2006
- Venue: San Manuel Indian Bingo and Casino
- City: Highland, California

Event chronology
WEC 20: Cinco de Mayhem	WEC 21: Tapout	WEC 22: The Hitman

WEC 21: Tapout was a mixed martial arts event held on June 15, 2006. WEC 21's main event was a fight between Rob McCullough and Ryan Healy.

== Results ==
Main Card
Weight class				Method	Round	Time	Notes
Lightweight	Rob McCullough	def.	Ryan Healy	TKO (cut)	1	1:52
Lightweight	Nate Diaz	def.	Joe Hurley	Submission (triangle choke)	2	2:03
Lightweight	Hermes Franca (c)	def.	Brandon Olsen	Submission (armbar)	1	0:40	(Note: For the WEC Lightweight Championship.)
Heavyweight	Justin Eilers	def.	Jimmy Ambriz	TKO (doctor stoppage)	1	5:00
Light Heavyweight	Brian Stann	def.	Miguel Cosio	TKO (punches)	1	0:16
Lightweight	Rich Crunkilton	def.	Adam Lynn	Submission (rear-naked choke)	2	1:20
Welterweight	Mike Penalber	def.	Joe Martin	Decision (split)	3	3:00
Heavyweight	Kyle York	def.	Jason Glaza	TKO (punches)	1	0:46

== See also ==
- World Extreme Cagefighting
- List of World Extreme Cagefighting champions
- List of WEC events
- 2006 in WEC
