= WEC 14 =

WEC MMA events in 2005

WEC 14: Vengeance
- Promotion: World Extreme Cagefighting
- Date: March 17, 2005
- Venue: Tachi Palace Hotel & Casino
- City: Lemoore, California

Event chronology
WEC 13: Heavyweight Explosion	WEC 14: Vengeance	WEC 15: Judgment Day

WEC 14: Vengeance was a mixed martial arts event promoted by World Extreme Cagefighting on March 17, 2005, at the Tachi Palace Hotel & Casino in Lemoore, California. The Main Event saw John Polakowski take on Olaf Alfonso.

== Results ==
Main Card
Weight class				Method	Round	Time	Notes
Lightweight	John Polakowski	def.	Olaf Alfonso	TKO (Corner Stoppage)	1	5:00
Heavyweight	Wesley Correira	def.	Walt Pels	KO (Punches)	1	0:23
Light Heavyweight	Terry Martin	def.	Homer Moore	Submission (Punches)	2	3:14	(Note: For the vacant WEC Light Heavyweight Championship.)
Middleweight	Alex Serdyukov	def.	Mark Weir	Submission (Arm-Triangle Choke)	2	2:56	(Note: For the WEC Middleweight Championship.)
Heavyweight	Brad Imes	def.	Mike Dexter	Submission (Triangle Choke)	1	3:44
Light Heavyweight	Abraham Baxter	def.	Patrick Kaase	TKO (Punches)	1	2:12
Lightweight	Gabe Ruediger (c)	def.	Jason Maxwell	Submission (Rear-Naked Choke)	1	3:28	(Note: For the WEC Lightweight Championship.)
Heavyweight	Brian Olsen	def.	Craig Zellner	TKO (Punches)	2	N/A
Welterweight	Brian Gassaway	def.	Ross Ebanez	NC (Accidental Headbutt)	0	N/A
Light Heavyweight	Josh Green	def.	Troy Miller	Submission (Rear-Naked Choke)	1	1:56
Bantamweight	Antonio Banuelos	def.	Mike Lindquist	Submission (Rear-Naked Choke)	1	1:38
Lightweight	Dan Marks	def.	Mike Alirez	KO (Head Kick)	1	0:31
Heavyweight	Carlton Jones	def.	Chris Botelho	TKO (Punches)	1	3:14

== See also ==
- World Extreme Cagefighting
- List of World Extreme Cagefighting champions
- List of WEC events
- 2005 in WEC
