= Scott Smith (fighter) =

American mixed martial artist (born 1979)

- Born: May 21, 1979 (age 47); Reno, Nevada, U.S.
- Other names: Hands of Steel
- Height: 6 ft 0 in (1.83 m)
- Weight: 185 lb (84 kg; 13 st 3 lb)
- Division: Heavyweight; Light Heavyweight; Middleweight; Welterweight
- Fighting out of: Elk Grove, California, U.S.
- Team: Capital City Fighting Alliance
- Years active: 2001–2016

Mixed martial arts record
- Total: 30
- Wins: 18
- By knockout: 15
- By submission: 3
- Losses: 11
- By knockout: 5
- By submission: 4
- By decision: 2
- No contests: 1

Other information
- Mixed martial arts record from Sherdog

Scott Smith (born May 21, 1979) is an American retired mixed martial artist. A professional competitor from 2001 to 2016, Smith was a contestant on The Ultimate Fighter: The Comeback, and has competed for the UFC, Strikeforce, EliteXC and PFC. He is the former WEC Light Heavyweight Champion.

== Background ==
Smith was born in Reno, Nevada and raised in Elk Grove, California, attending Elk Grove High School where he competed in wrestling. Smith then continued his career in junior college where he placed in the California State Championship.

== Mixed martial arts career ==
=== Early career ===
In the early half of his career, Smith fought as a Heavyweight and compiled victories in the International Fighting Championships and Gladiator Challenge shows across the United States. While successful in the smaller promotions, Smith's first major appearance in the mixed martial arts world came in the World Extreme Cagefighting organization. Smith entered a WEC Light Heavyweight tournament with limited name recognition, but was branded by experts as the dark horse of the competition. Smith defeated WEC veteran Tim McKenzie in the semi-finals. With that victory, Smith was slated to fight Justin Levens in the tournament finals; Levens, however, was halted on doctor's advice due to a shoulder injury he sustained in his semi-final bout. The tournament alternate, Tait Fletcher, was brought into the championship round instead. Smith made short work of Fletcher, scoring a first-round technical knockout to become the WEC Light Heavyweight Champion.

Smith would defend his championship from Justin Levens at WEC 18 before scheduling a fight with the Ultimate Fighting Championship in April 2006, moving down a weight class to fight David Terrell at UFC 59. The fight – marked with questionable officiating – ended in controversial fashion, prompting Smith to file a complaint with the California State Athletic Commission. The referee called for a break, which Smith adhered to but Terrell did not hear. When Smith stopped fighting, Terrell quickly locked in a rear naked choke, which the referee did not break. Smith was forced to tap out and protested immediately.

Smith was then seen as a middleweight contestant on The Ultimate Fighter: The Comeback, where he quickly lost his quarterfinal matchup against Travis Lutter. Smith appeared on the season finale, knocking out Pete Sell in the second round of a very exciting fight in a sequence that saw Smith sustain a hard punch to the liver, and throw the bout-winning knockout punch before falling to the ground in pain.

Smith lost his next fight in the UFC by decision against Patrick Cote at UFC 67. Smith then defeated Troy Miller by technical knockout at Palace Fighting Championship 2 in Lemoore, California. He lost against Ed Herman at UFC 72. Herman submitted Smith with a rear naked choke at 2:25 in the second round after Herman landed a nasty elbow on Smith in the first round covering his face in blood.

=== EliteXC ===
Smith made his EliteXC debut on February 16 knocking out Kyle Noke seven seconds into round two. The victory earned him a title shot against Robbie Lawler. The bout was declared a no contest after an accidental poke in the eye in the third round. The first two rounds were so exciting that Gary Shaw awarded both fighters their win bonuses and announced an immediate rematch. Smith lost the subsequent rematch to Lawler via TKO on July 26, 2008, at EliteXC: Unfinished Business.

=== Strikeforce ===
At Strikeforce: Destruction, Smith took a fight with Terry Martin on one week's notice and defeated Martin via KO (punch) in the 1st round.

Smith faced Benji Radach at Strikeforce: Shamrock vs. Diaz on April 11, 2009. Smith defeated Radach by knocking him out in the third round. Radach had, for the majority of the fight, showcased his ability as the more refined striker, and was arguably heading toward a unanimous decision victory until Smith caught him with a flush straight right late on in round three and followed up with strikes to seal a dramatic victory. On June 6, 2009, Smith was matched up with Nick Diaz at a catchweight of 180 lb. during Strikeforce: Lawler vs. Shields, losing via rear naked choke at 1:19 of the third round.

Smith fought Cung Le at Strikeforce: Evolution on December 19, 2009. Despite being dominated throughout most of the fight, Smith won via third round knock out and became the first man to ever defeat Cung Le. Smith fought Le again in a rematch with at Strikeforce: Fedor vs. Werdum on June 26, 2010. Smith lost by second round KO.

Smith fought Paul Daley in a welterweight bout on December 4, 2010, at Strikeforce: Henderson vs. Babalu II. Daley defeated Smith via one punch KO in the first round. As Smith was throwing a punch, Daley caught him with a hook.

Smith took some time off after his loss to Daley, trying to heal up some injuries and rejuvenate his ground game. He faced Tarec Saffiedine at Welterweight at the Strikeforce: Fedor vs. Henderson event. He lost the bout via unanimous decision.

After an 8-month layoff, Smith faced Lumumba Sayers at Strikeforce: Tate vs. Rousey. He lost via submission (guillotine choke) in round one, suffering his fourth loss in a row.

=== Post-Strikeforce career ===
Smith was expected to face Marcus Gaines at Gladiator Challenge on June 23, 2012, but an injury during training forced him to withdraw from the bout.

Smith faced Mark Matthews on August 3, 2013, at WCFC 6 for the WCFC Middleweight Championship. He won the fight via second round TKO. He was then expected to face Max Griffin at WCFC 8 on February 15, 2014, however the bout was cancelled prior to the event.

== Personal life ==
Smith has two sons. Smith has a younger brother, Shawn, who is also a mixed martial artist. He also has three sisters and an older brother.

== Championships and accomplishments ==
- Ultimate Fighting Championship
  - UFC.com Awards
    - 2006: Ranked #2 Knockout of the Year & Ranked #6 Fight of the Year vs. Pete Sell
- West Coast Fighting Championship
  - WCFC Middleweight Championship (One time, current)
- World Extreme Cagefighting
  - WEC Light Heavyweight Championship (One time)
    - One successful title defense

== Mixed martial arts record ==
Professional record breakdown
30 matches	18 wins	11 losses
By knockout	15	5
By submission	3	4
By decision	0	2
No contests	1	

Res.	Record	Opponent	Method	Event	Date	Round	Time	Location	Notes
Loss	18–11 (1)	Justin Baesman	TKO (punches)	WCFC 16: King of Sacramento	January 23, 2016	2	0:57	Sacramento, California, United States	Welterweight bout.
Win	18–10 (1)	Mark Matthews	TKO (punches)	WCFC 6: Matthews vs. Smith	August 3, 2013	2	0:41	Placerville, California, United States	Won the vacant WCFC Middleweight Championship.
Loss	17–10 (1)	Lumumba Sayers	Submission (guillotine choke)	Strikeforce: Tate vs. Rousey	March 3, 2012	1	1:34	Columbus, Ohio, United States	Return to Middleweight.
Loss	17–9 (1)	Tarec Saffiedine	Decision (unanimous)	Strikeforce: Fedor vs. Henderson	July 30, 2011	3	5:00	Hoffman Estates, Illinois, United States	
Loss	17–8 (1)	Paul Daley	KO (punch)	Strikeforce: Henderson vs. Babalu II	December 4, 2010	1	2:09	St. Louis, Missouri, United States	Welterweight debut.
Loss	17–7 (1)	Cung Le	TKO (spinning back kick and punches)	Strikeforce: Fedor vs. Werdum	June 26, 2010	2	1:46	San Jose, California, United States	
Win	17–6 (1)	Cung Le	KO/TKO (punches)	Strikeforce: Evolution	December 19, 2009	3	3:25	San Jose, California, United States	
Loss	16–6 (1)	Nick Diaz	Submission (rear-naked choke)	Strikeforce: Lawler vs. Shields	June 6, 2009	3	1:19	St. Louis, Missouri, United States	Catchweight bout (180 lbs).
Win	16–5 (1)	Benji Radach	KO (punch)	Strikeforce: Shamrock vs. Diaz	April 11, 2009	3	3:24	San Jose, California, United States	
Win	15–5 (1)	Terry Martin	KO (punch)	Strikeforce: Destruction	November 21, 2008	1	0:24	San Jose, California, United States	
Loss	14–5 (1)	Robbie Lawler	TKO (soccer kicks and punches)	EliteXC: Unfinished Business	July 26, 2008	2	2:35	Stockton, California, United States	For the Elite XC Middleweight Championship.
NC	14–4 (1)	Robbie Lawler	NC (accidental eye poke)	EliteXC: Primetime	May 31, 2008	3	3:26	Newark, New Jersey, United States	For the Elite XC Middleweight Championship. Accidental eye poke rendered Smith unable to continue.
Win	14–4	Kyle Noke	KO (punch)	EliteXC: Street Certified	February 16, 2008	2	0:07	Miami, Florida, United States	
Win	13–4	Jeff Morris	KO (punch)	GC 73: High Noon	December 22, 2007	1	0:22	Sacramento, California, United States	
Loss	12–4	Ed Herman	Submission (rear-naked choke)	UFC 72	June 16, 2007	2	2:25	Belfast, Northern Ireland	
Win	12–3	Troy Miller	KO (punch)	PFC 2	March 22, 2007	1	1:06	Lemoore, California, United States	
Loss	11–3	Patrick Côté	Decision (unanimous)	UFC 67	February 3, 2007	3	5:00	Las Vegas, Nevada, United States	
Win	11–2	Pete Sell	KO (punch)	The Ultimate Fighter: The Comeback Finale	November 11, 2006	2	3:25	Las Vegas, Nevada, United States	Fight of the Night.
Loss	10–2	David Terrell	Submission (rear-naked choke)	UFC 59: Reality Check	April 15, 2006	1	3:08	Anaheim, California, United States	Return to Middleweight.
Win	10–1	Justin Levens	KO (punches)	WEC 18: Unfinished Business	January 13, 2006	1	1:58	Lemoore, California, United States	Defended the WEC Light Heavyweight Championship.
Win	9–1	Tait Fletcher	TKO (punches)	WEC 17	October 14, 2005	1	3:55	Lemoore, California, United States	Won the vacant WEC Light Heavyweight Championship.
Win	8–1	Tim McKenzie	TKO (punches)	WEC 17	October 14, 2005	1	2:25	Lemoore, California, United States	Light Heavyweight debut; WEC Light Heavyweight Semifinals.
Win	7–1	John Seilhan	KO (punch)	Gladiator Challenge 30	August 19, 2004	1	1:29	Colusa, California, United States	
Win	6–1	Isidro Gonzalez	Submission (rear-naked choke)	SF 3: Dome	April 17, 2004	1	4:07	Gresham, Oregon, United States	
Loss	5–1	James Irvin	KO (punch)	Gladiator Challenge 22	February 12, 2004	1	2:21	Colusa, California, United States	
Win	5–0	Jaime Jara	Submission (rear-naked choke)	Gladiator Challenge 20	November 13, 2003	1	3:01	Colusa, California, United States	
Win	4–0	Jaime Jara	TKO (punches)	Gladiator Challenge 16	June 1, 2003	1	4:13	Colusa, California, United States	
Win	3–0	Levi Thornbrue	TKO (punches)	Gladiator Challenge 10	April 14, 2002	1	2:20	Colusa, California, United States	Heavyweight debut.
Win	2–0	Tim Kennedy	TKO (doctor stoppage)	IFC: Warriors Challenge 15	August 31, 2001	1	2:53	Oroville, California, United States	
Win	1–0	Ted Stamatelos	Submission (guillotine choke)	IFC: Warriors Challenge 13	June 15, 2001	1	3:16	California, United States	

Vacant Title last held by Jason Lambert	3rd WEC Light Heavyweight Champion; October 14, 2005 – May 2006	Vacant Smith participated at The Ultimate Fighter Title next held by Lodune Sincaid
