= Brad Imes =

American mixed martial artist

- Imes in 2007
- Born: Bradley Imes Smith; March 13, 1977 (age 49); Maryville, Missouri, United States
- Other names: The Hillbilly Heartthrob
- Height: 6 ft 7 in (2.01 m)
- Weight: 260 lb (120 kg; 19 st)
- Division: Heavyweight
- Fighting out of: Bettendorf, Iowa
- Team: Sacramento BJJ; Miletich Fighting Systems
- Years active: 2004–2009

Mixed martial arts record
- Total: 20
- Wins: 13
- By knockout: 3
- By submission: 8
- By decision: 2
- Losses: 7
- By knockout: 3
- By submission: 1
- By decision: 3

Other information
- University: University of Missouri
- Mixed martial arts record from Sherdog

Bradley Imes "Brad" Smith (born March 13, 1977), better known as Brad Imes, is a retired American mixed martial artist. He appeared on The Ultimate Fighter 2, and has competed as a Heavyweight in the Ultimate Fighting Championship (UFC), World Extreme Cagefighting (WEC), International Fight League (IFL), Palace Fighting Championship (PFC), Titan Fighting Championships (Titan FC), and King of the Cage (KOTC).

== Background ==
Imes was born and raised in Maryville, Missouri. He began wrestling when he was five years old. He also played high school football in Columbia, Missouri, but did not start at a position on the team. Imes was 5'9" and weighed 165 lbs when he graduated before attending the University of Missouri. Within the next two years, Imes stood at 6'7", weighed 290 lbs, and walked on to the school's football team as a sophomore before earning a scholarship as an offensive tackle and lettering in his senior season. After college, Imes played for the Iowa Barnstormers of the Arena Football League for two seasons and was a strength coach for TCU. Imes later moved to Sacramento, California, where he worked as the general manager of a landscaping supply store before being laid off, and then began pursuing mixed martial arts.

== Mixed martial arts career ==
=== Early career ===
Imes made his professional debut in 2004 for the WEC and won his first three fights before being invited to compete on The Ultimate Fighter 2.

=== The Ultimate Fighter 2 ===
Imes was the last pick for his division, and was coached by his training partner and then-UFC Middleweight Champion, Rich Franklin. In his first fight in the house, Imes defeated Rob MacDonald via triangle choke submission in the first round. In the semi-finals, Imes faced Seth Petruzelli and won via split decision. At The Ultimate Fighter 2 Finale on November 5, 2005, Imes faced future UFC Light Heavyweight Champion Rashad Evans, and lost via split decision, the first loss of his career.

=== Ultimate Fighting Championship ===
At UFC Ultimate Fight Night 4 on April 6, 2006, Imes faced Dan Christison and lost via armbar submission in the third round, but won Fight of the Night honors. He then won two fights for independent promotions before returning to the UFC at UFC 69 on April 7, 2007, and lost via unanimous decision.

=== Post-UFC ===
After his last appearance in the UFC, Imes went 7–1, fighting in promotions such as the Palace Fighting Championship and King of the Cage before being signed by the International Fight League.

=== International Fight League ===
Imes made his IFL debut on May 16, 2008 at IFL: Connecticut, facing then-champion Roy Nelson for the IFL Heavyweight Championship. He was knocked out with a punch in the first round.

=== Post-IFL ===
Imes went 1–2 in his last three professional fights before retiring. According to Imes, he retired from the sport due to concerns over his brain health after accumulating trauma from football and mixed martial arts.

== Post-retirement ==
Imes works as a project manager for a construction company in San Antonio, TX. Imes worked as a full-time firefighter in Jefferson City, Missouri.

Imes was featured in a small role in the 2007 action film Missionary Man.

== Personal life ==
Imes and his wife had their first child together in March 2011.

== Championships and accomplishments ==
- Ultimate Fighting Championship
  - Fight of the Night (One time) vs. Dan Christison
- Ultimate Fighting Championship
  - UFC Encyclopedia Awards
    - Fight of the Night (One time) vs. Rashad Evans
  - UFC.com Awards
    - 2005: Ranked #4 Fight of the Year vs. Rashad Evans
    - 2006: Ranked #9 Fight of the Year vs. Dan Christison

== Mixed martial arts record ==
Professional record breakdown
20 matches	13 wins	7 losses
By knockout	2	3
By submission	9	1
By decision	2	3

Res.	Record	Opponent	Method	Event	Date	Round	Time	Location	Notes
Loss	13–7	Josh Queen	KO (punches)	Arena Rumble	September 12, 2009	1	0:36	Spokane, Washington, United States	
Loss	13–6	Patrick Smith	KO (punches)	Titan FC 13	March 13, 2009	1	0:28	Kansas City, Missouri, United States	
Win	13–5	Chris Guillen	Submission (punches)	EC 109: Extreme Challenge 109	October 18, 2008	2	3:14	Moline, Illinois, United States	
Loss	12–5	Roy Nelson	KO (punches)	IFL: Connecticut	May 16, 2008	1	2:55	Uncasville, Connecticut, United States	For the IFL Heavyweight Championship.
Win	12–4	James Jack	Decision (unanimous)	TFF: True Fight Fans	March 7, 2008	3	5:00	Missouri, United States	
Loss	11–4	Anthony Ruiz	Decision (split)	PFC 6: No Retreat, No Surrender	January 17, 2008	3	5:00	Lemoore, California, United States	
Win	11–3	Chris Blaire	TKO (punches)	PFC 5: Beatdown at 4 Bears	November 10, 2007	1	4:13	New Town, North Dakota, United States	
Win	10–3	Bo Cantrell	Submission (gogoplata)	KOTC: Arch Rivals	October 27, 2007	1	0:55	Reno, Nevada, United States	
Win	9–3	Zak Jensen	Submission (gogoplata)	WFC: Downtown Throwdown	September 15, 2007	1	1:31	Minneapolis, Minnesota, United States	
Win	8–3	Tony Mendoza	Submission (rear-naked choke)	Ring Wars 15	August 7, 2007	1	2:50	South Dakota, United States	
Win	7–3	Vince Lucero	Submission (rear-naked choke)	Tuff N-Uff 3	June 22, 2007	1	2:26	Las Vegas, Nevada, United States	
Loss	6–3	Heath Herring	Decision (unanimous)	UFC 69	April 7, 2007	3	5:00	Houston, Texas, United States	
Win	6–2	Chris Adams	KO (punch)	Combat FC 3	February 17, 2007	1	0:18	Orlando, Florida, United States	
Win	5–2	Greg Hammer	Submission (triangle choke)	Winter War	February 4, 2007	2	1:44	Spirit Lake, Iowa, United States	
Win	4–2	Cody Monroe	Submission (punches)	Ring Style - Bad Blood	April 22, 2006	1	N/A	Moline, Illinois, United States	
Loss	3–2	Dan Christison	Submission (armbar)	UFC Fight Night 4	April 6, 2006	3	3:37	Las Vegas, Nevada, United States	Fight of the Night.
Loss	3–1	Rashad Evans	Decision (split)	The Ultimate Fighter: Team Hughes vs. Team Franklin Finale	November 5, 2005	3	5:00	Las Vegas, Nevada, United States	The Ultimate Fighter Season 2 Heavyweight tournament final.
Win	3–0	Mike Dexter	Submission (triangle choke)	WEC 14: Vengeance	March 17, 2005	1	3:44	Lemoore, California, United States	
Win	2–0	Lace Pele	Submission (punches)	WEC 13: Heavyweight Explosion	January 22, 2005	1	2:04	Lemoore, California, United States	
Win	1–0	Jeremy Freitag	Decision (split)	WEC 12	October 21, 2004	3	5:00	Lemoore, California, United States	
