= WEC 22 =

WEC MMA events in 2006

WEC 22: The Hitman
- Promotion: World Extreme Cagefighting
- Date: July 28, 2006
- Venue: Tachi Palace Hotel & Casino
- City: Lemoore, California

Event chronology
WEC 21: Tapout	WEC 22: The Hitman	WEC 23: Hot August Fights

WEC 22: The Hitman was a mixed martial arts event held on July 28, 2006. WEC 22 was also known as the Ryan Bennett Memorial Card in memory of the sportscaster and MMA journalist who died two months prior to the event.

== Results ==
Main Card
Weight class				Method	Round	Time	Notes
Lightweight	Mike Joy	def.	Robert Densley	Submission (Armbar)	1	4:58
Catchweight (208 lbs)	Doug Marshall	def.	Jeff Terry	TKO (Punches)	1	1:50
Catchweight (178 lbs)	J.T. Taylor	def.	Drew Dimanlig	Submission (Armbar)	1	3:47
Light heavyweight	Alex Stiebling	def.	Jason Guida	Decision (Unanimous)	3	5:00
Heavyweight	Wes Sims	def.	Joel Surprenant	Submission (Triangle Choke)	1	0:28
Welterweight	Patrick Murphy	def.	Joel Thomas	Decision (Unanimous)	3	5:00
Featherweight	Trevor Harris	def.	Colley Bradford	Submission (Rear-Naked Choke)	1	2:19
Welterweight	Jonathan Mix	def.	Mario Rivera	Submission (Rear-Naked Choke)	3	3:47
Light heavyweight	Glover Teixeira	def.	Jack Morrison	Submission (Rear-Naked Choke)	1	1:27
Catchweight (178 lbs)	Poppies Martinez	def.	Troy Miller	Submission (Armbar)	1	0:50
Lightweight	Casey Olson	def.	Alvin Cacdac	TKO (Punches)	1	2:28

== See also ==
- World Extreme Cagefighting
- List of World Extreme Cagefighting champions
- List of WEC events
- 2006 in WEC
