= WEC 20 =

WEC MMA events in 2006

WEC 20: Cinco de Mayhem
- Promotion: World Extreme Cagefighting
- Date: May 5, 2006
- Venue: Tachi Palace Hotel & Casino
- City: Lemoore, California

Event chronology
WEC 19: Undisputed	WEC 20: Cinco de Mayhem	WEC 21: Tapout

WEC 20: Cinco de Mayhem was a mixed martial arts event held by World Extreme Cagefighting that took place on May 5, 2006 at Tachi Palace Hotel & Casino in Lemoore, California. WEC 20's main event was a heavyweight bout between Brian Olsen and Mike Kyle.

== Results ==
Main Card
Weight class				Method	Round	Time	Notes
Heavyweight	Brian Olsen (c)	def.	Mike Kyle	DQ (strikes after the bell)	1	5:00	(Note: For the WEC Heavyweight Championship.)
Light Heavyweight	Lodune Sincaid	def.	Dan Molina	Submission (rear-naked choke)	1	3:17	(Note: For the vacant WEC Light Heavyweight Championship.)
Lightweight	Cory Cass	def.	Poppies Martinez	Submission (armbar)	1	0:47
Light Heavyweight	Glover Teixeira	def.	Carlton Jones	TKO (punches)	1	1:57
Light Heavyweight	Jeremy Freitag	def.	Paul Moreno	Submission (armbar)	1	2:22
Middleweight	Kenny Ento	def.	Phil Collins	Submission (armbar)	1	1:07
Bantamweight	Eddie Wineland	def.	Antonio Banuelos	KO (head kick and punches)	1	2:36	(Note: For the inaugural WEC Bantamweight Championship.)
Lightweight	Rob McCullough	def.	Randy Hauer	TKO (punches)	1	2:36
Lightweight	Nate Diaz	def.	Gilbert Rael	TKO (punches)	1	3:35
Lightweight	Cassio Werneck	def.	Ashe Bowman	Submission (armbar)	2	3:05
Middleweight	Fernando Gonzalez	def.	Jimmy Dexter	Submission (rear-naked choke)	1	4:09
Middleweight	Keith Berry	def.	Donny Rider	TKO (punches)	1	0:36

== See also ==
- World Extreme Cagefighting
- List of World Extreme Cagefighting champions
- List of WEC events
- 2006 in WEC
