= Bret Bergmark =

American mixed martial artist

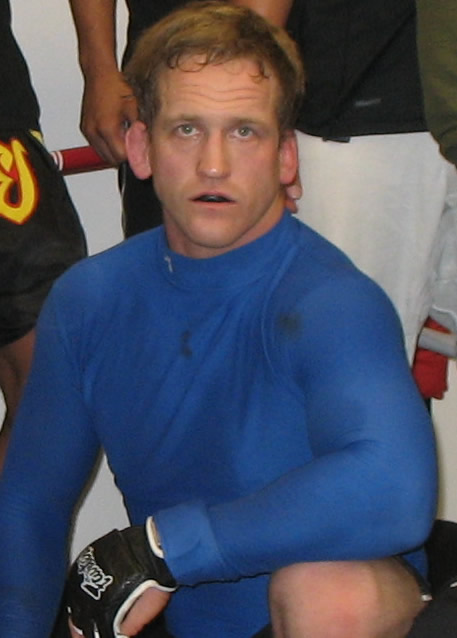
- Born: November 24, 1973 (age 52); Novato, California, United States
- Other names: The Angry Hick
- Height: 5 ft 9 in (1.75 m)
- Weight: 170 lb (77 kg; 12 st)
- Division: Light Heavyweight; Middleweight; Welterweight
- Stance: Orthodox
- Fighting out of: Pleasant Hill, California, United States
- Team: Cesar Gracie Jiu Jitsu Academy; Fairtex Gym
- Rank: Brown belt in Brazilian Jiu-Jitsu
- Years active: 2002–2010

Mixed martial arts record
- Total: 8
- Wins: 6
- By knockout: 2
- By submission: 1
- By decision: 3
- Losses: 1
- By submission: 1
- Draws: 1

Other information
- Mixed martial arts record from Sherdog

Bret Bergmark (born November 24, 1973) is an American retired professional mixed martial artist. A competitor from 2002 until 2010, Bergmark has fought for the WEC, Strikeforce, and Pancrase.

== Biography ==
Bret was born in Novato, California, the son of a San Francisco police officer. He attended and graduated from San Marin High School, where he wrestled for four years. After high school Bret took up rodeo bull riding, until a wrist injury forced him to retire. It was at this time that Bret turned his energy toward training in Gracie Jiu Jitsu, joining the Ralph Gracie academy in 1999. After gaining his blue belt he left the Ralph Gracie academy to train at the Cesar Gracie academy in Pleasant Hill, California, in 2002. It was at the Cesar Gracie academy that Bret earned his purple belt and started fighting in professional MMA matches. Bret currently trains and teaches out of the Cesar Gracie academy in Pleasant Hill, California. He also occasionally trains at the respective academies of Jake Shields (Graciefighter Berkeley), Nick Diaz and Nate Diaz (Graciefighter Lodi), Gilbert Melendez (El Nino Training Center), Jon Santos (Team Santos Jiu Jitsu) and Dave Terrell (Nor Cal Fighting Alliance).

== Mixed martial arts career ==
Bergmark had his first professional MMA fight on August 3, 2002, shortly after joining the Cesar Gracie academy. He fought Paul Ano in Warriors Quest 6 - The Best of the Best. After a brutal fight, which saw each fighter give and receive punishment, Bergmark locked up an armbar at 4:45 of the second round forcing the referee to stop the action and giving Bret the victory.

Bret next fought in a superfight for the Ultimate Athlete 4 - King of the Mountain tournament on September 28, 2002. He was matched up against seasoned veteran and American Kickboxing Academy member Brian Ebersole. The fight would go the distance, with both fighters landing punches and takedowns. Bergmark would earn the victory via split decision.

Bret's third fight was against Brodie Farber at WEC 6: Return of a Legend on March 27, 2003. After some early ground fighting that saw Bret taking his opponent down and several sweeps and reversals, Bret finally achieved mount and forced the referee to stop the match at 3:57 of the first round due to strikes, giving Bret the victory.

For his fourth fight Bret moved to the legendary Pancrase organization in Japan, taking on UFC and Pancrase veteran Keiichiro Yamamiya at Pancrase Hybrid: 11 on December 21, 2003. After going all three rounds without either fighter able to finish the bout, the fight went to the judges scorecards and was ruled a draw.

Bret's next fight was back in the WEC at WEC 10: Bragging Rights on May 21, 2004. Again Bret was matched up against a seasoned Pancrase veteran in Daisuke Ishii. In an exciting back and forth fight that saw action both on the ground and on the feet, Bret finally secured the mount and forced the referee to stop the fight at 4:49 of the first round due to strikes, earning him his fourth victory.

On October 14, 2005, Bret took on Mike Pyle at WEC 17: Halloween Fury 4. The fight quickly went to the ground, where after several reversals of position Pyle locked in a triangle choke, forcing Bret to tap at 3:36 of the first round and giving Bret his first loss.

After a two-year layoff, Bret dropped to the 170 pound weight class to fight Jesse Juarez on April 26, 2008, in the Iroquois MMA championships. After 3 rounds of action Bret earned a unanimous decision.

Bret made his Strikeforce debut on June 26, 2010, in San Jose California as he fought Vagner Rocha in the prelims. Bret earned his first victory for the company by unanimous decision.

Bret was scheduled to fight October 9, 2010 at Strikeforce: Diaz vs. Noons II against Cung Le product James Terry, but had to pull out due to an injury sustained while training for the fight.

== Brazilian Jiu-Jitsu ==
Bergmark is currently a Brazilian Jiu Jitsu brown belt under the world-renowned Cesar Gracie, with whom he has been training since 2002.

== Muay Thai ==
Bret also trains in Muay Thai kickboxing, starting his training with World Team USA and then continuing at Gym 445 in San Francisco, California. He currently trains Muay Thai at Fairtex Gym in San Francisco.

== Mixed martial arts record ==
Professional record breakdown
8 matches	6 wins	1 loss
By knockout	2	0
By submission	1	1
By decision	3	0
Draws	1	

Res.	Record	Opponent	Method	Event	Date	Round	Time	Location	Notes
Win	6–1–1	Vagner Rocha	Decision (unanimous)	Strikeforce: Fedor vs. Werdum	June 26, 2010	3	5:00	San Jose, California, United States	
Win	5–1–1	Jesse Juarez	Decision (unanimous)	Iroquois Mixed Martial Arts Championships III	April 26, 2008	3	5:00	Ontario, California	
Loss	4–1–1	Mike Pyle	Submission (triangle choke)	WEC 17	October 14, 2005	1	3.36	Lemoore, California, United States	Welterweight debut; for the vacant WEC Welterweight Championship.
Win	4–0–1	Daisuke Ishii	TKO (punches)	WEC 10	May 21, 2004	1	4:49	Lemoore, California, United States	
Draw	3–0–1	Keiichiro Yamamiya	Draw	Pancrase: Hybrid 11	December 21, 2003	3	5:00	Tokyo, Japan	Light Heavyweight bout.
Win	3–0	Brodie Farber	TKO (punches)	WEC 6	March 27, 2003	1	3:57	Lemoore, California, United States	Middleweight debut.
Win	2–0	Brian Ebersole	Decision (split)	Ultimate Athlete 4: King of the Mountain	September 28, 2002	3	5:00	Auberry, California, United States	
Win	1–0	Paul Ano	Submission (armbar)	Warrior's Quest 6: Best of the Best	August 3, 2002	2	4:45	Honolulu, Hawaii, United States	
