= Andre Roberts (fighter) =

American mixed martial arts (MMA) fighter

- Born: February 24, 1965 (age 61); Tama, Iowa, United States
- Other names: The Chief
- Height: 6 ft 2 in (1.88 m)
- Weight: 350 lb (160 kg; 25 st)
- Division: Super Heavyweight; Heavyweight
- Fighting out of: Tama, Iowa, United States
- Years active: 1997-1999, 2003-2005

Mixed martial arts record
- Total: 17
- Wins: 14
- By knockout: 8
- By submission: 5
- Unknown: 1
- Losses: 2
- By knockout: 1
- By submission: 1
- Draws: 1

Other information
- Mixed martial arts record from Sherdog

Andre Roberts (born February 24, 1965) is a retired American mixed martial arts fighter. A professional from 1997 until 2005, he fought in the UFC and the WEC.

== Career accomplishments ==
=== Mixed martial arts ===
- Ultimate Fighting Championship
  - UFC Encyclopedia Awards
    - Fight of the Night (One time) vs. Ron Waterman

== Mixed martial arts record ==
Professional record breakdown
17 matches	14 wins	2 losses
By knockout	8	1
By submission	5	1
Unknown	1	0
Draws	1	

Res.	Record	Opponent	Method	Event	Date	Round	Time	Location	Notes
Loss	14–2–1	Dan Christison	Submission (armbar)	WEC 13: Heavyweight Explosion	January 22, 2005	1	3:26	California, United States	For the vacant WEC Super Heavyweight Championship.
Draw	14–1–1	Ruben Villareal	Draw	SB 38: SuperBrawl 38	December 12, 2004	3	5:00	Hawaii, United States	
Win	14–1	Gabe Beauperthy	Submission (kimura)	EC 57: Extreme Challenge 57	May 6, 2004	1	3:34	Iowa, United States	
Win	13–1	Johnathan Ivey	Submission (bad position)	SB 30: Collision Course	June 12, 2003	1	1:38	Hawaii, United States	
Win	12–1	Ray Seraille	Submission (neck crank)	SB 28: SuperBrawl 28	February 8, 2003	1	2:49	Hawaii, United States	
Win	11–1	Joe Campanella	TKO	EC 27: Extreme Challenge 27	August 21, 1999	1	2:07	Iowa, United States	
Win	10–1	Ron Waterman	KO	UFC 21	July 16, 1999	1	2:51	Iowa, United States	
Loss	9–1	Gary Goodridge	TKO (submission to punch)	UFC 19	March 5, 1999	1	0:43	Mississippi, United States	
Win	9–0	Jamie Schell	TKO	ICF 1: Iowa Cage Fighting 1	August 8, 1998	1	1:25	Iowa, United States	
Win	8–0	Jamie Schell	TKO	MFC 1: Midwest Fighting 1	July 28, 1998	1	1:35		
Win	7–0	Dave Kirshman	TKO (submission to slam)	MFC 1: Midwest Fighting 1	July 28, 1998	1	0:10		
Win	6–0	Phil Breecher	N/A	EC 19: Extreme Challenge 19	June 20, 1998	1	0:35	Wisconsin, United States	
Win	5–0	Harry Moskowitz	KO	UFC 17	May 15, 1998	1	3:15	Alabama, United States	
Win	4–0	Jason Brewer	TKO (submission to punches)	EC 15: Extreme Challenge 15	February 27, 1998	1	0:39	Indiana, United States	
Win	3–0	Sam Adkins	Submission	EC 11: Extreme Challenge 11	November 22, 1997	1	4:02	Iowa, United States	
Win	2–0	Jim Axtell	Submission	EC 4: Extreme Challenge 4	February 22, 1997	1	5:41	Iowa, United States	
Win	1–0	Trevor Thrasher	TKO (submission to punches)	EC 2: Extreme Challenge 2	February 1, 1997	1	3:59	Iowa, United States	
