= Justin Levens =

American mixed martial arts fighter

- Born: April 18, 1980; Philadelphia, Pennsylvania, United States
- Died: December 17, 2008 (aged 28); Laguna Niguel, California, United States
- Other names: The Executioner
- Height: 5 ft 10 in (1.78 m)
- Weight: 185 lb (84 kg; 13.2 st)
- Division: Light Heavyweight; Middleweight
- Stance: Orthodox
- Fighting out of: Newport Beach, California, United States
- Team: CSW Training Center
- Rank: Black belt in Brazilian Jiu-Jitsu under Marco Ruas
- Years active: 2004-2007

Mixed martial arts record
- Total: 17
- Wins: 9
- By knockout: 7
- By submission: 2
- Losses: 8
- By knockout: 4
- By submission: 2
- By decision: 2

Other information
- Mixed martial arts record from Sherdog

Justin Robert Levens (April 18, 1980 – December 17, 2008) was an American mixed martial artist. A professional competitor from 2004 until 2007, he competed for the UFC, the WEC, the Palace Fighting Championship, and for the Southern California Condors of the IFL.

Levens and his wife died from gunshot wounds in mid-December 2008. The incident is a murder-suicide, according to law enforcement officials.

== Background ==
Levens grew up poor in the Philadelphia housing projects, as a child with ADHD, and was on his own from age 15. After his parents divorced when Levens was four, he eventually moved to Newport Beach, California, where he learned to channel his aggressive energy from into organized fighting. Levens was also a talented baseball player at Capistrano Valley High School, continuing his career briefly in minor league baseball, and also joined the Navy for a few years before returning to train in martial arts and MMA. Levens began training at Marco Ruas' Vale Tudo academy in Orange County.

== Mixed martial arts career ==
Levens fought from 2004 to 2008, taking the nickname "The Executioner". Levens' first fight was a victory against Hector Carrilo in 2004. He had a string of wins after the Carrilo fight for almost two years.

After his seventh win, he lost to Scott Smith in January 2006. After his loss to Smith, Levens was called in by the UFC to fight former UFC Middleweight Champion Evan Tanner, replacing an injured Jeremy Horn on short notice. He lost the fight in the first round by triangle choke submission. Levens next faced prospect Jorge Santiago at UFC Fight Night 6. He lost the fight after getting caught by a knee in the first round. After two straight losses he was cut from the UFC roster. Levens had a declining record for the remainder of his career, interspersed with a pair of back-to-back victories against Justin Hawes and Brian Warren and 5 straight losses, 3 of which were against future UFC fighters.

Levens' last fight was scheduled for July 2008, but did not occur due to time constraints that led to scheduling issues. He tested positive for oxymorphone before the fight and was suspended until January 2009. Friend Tom Atencio said Levens was troubled by his declining career.

== Personal life ==
Kimbo Luzano, another friend, said Levens may have been depressed about not being able to fight and money issues, as well as troubled by the suicide of fellow MMA fighter and friend Jeremy Williams.

In 2003, Levens was involved in a domestic violence case, and was involved in an assault case over a man who allegedly owed Levens' wife, Sara McLean-Levens, 200 dollars in 2005.

On December 17, 2008, Levens and his wife, Sara, 25, were both found dead in their home in Laguna Niguel, California. Both had died of gunshot wounds; in Levens' case, to his head. The police are investigating the deaths as a possible murder-suicide. No suicide note was found, but a handgun was found close to Leven's body. There were no signs of a struggle.

== Mixed martial arts record ==
Professional record breakdown
17 matches	9 wins	8 losses
By knockout	7	4
By submission	2	2
By decision	0	2

Res.	Record	Opponent	Method	Event	Date	Round	Time	Location	Notes
Loss	9–8	Kenny Ento	Submission (triangle choke)	Palace Fighting Championship 4: Project Complete	October 18, 2007	1	2:15	Lemoore, California, United States	
Loss	9–7	Nate James	Decision (unanimous)	IFO: Wiuff vs. Salmon	September 1, 2007	3	5:00	Las Vegas, Nevada, United States	
Loss	9–6	Brian Foster	TKO (punches)	IFL: Chicago	May 19, 2007	1	1:17	Chicago, Illinois, United States	Return to Middleweight.
Loss	9–5	Vladimir Matyushenko	TKO (strikes)	IFL: Los Angeles	March 17, 2007	1	3:53	Los Angeles, California, United States	Light Heavyweight bout.
Loss	9–4	Reese Andy	Decision (unanimous)	IFL: Oakland	January 19, 2007	3	4:00	Oakland, California, United States	Light Heavyweight bout.
Win	9–3	Brian Warren	Technical Submission (triangle choke)	Beatdown in Bakersfield	November 17, 2006	1	2:53	Bakersfield, California, United States	
Win	8–3	Justin Hawes	TKO (strikes)	WEC 24: Full Force	October 12, 2006	1	1:28	Lemoore, California, United States	Catchweight (198 lbs) bout.
Loss	7–3	Jorge Santiago	KO (knee)	UFC Fight Night 5	June 28, 2006	1	2:13	Las Vegas, Nevada, United States	
Loss	7–2	Evan Tanner	Submission (triangle choke)	UFC 59: Reality Check	April 15, 2006	1	3:14	Anaheim, California, United States	Middleweight debut.
Loss	7–1	Scott Smith	KO (punches)	WEC 18: Unfinished Business	January 13, 2006	1	1:58	Lemoore, California, United States	For the WEC Light Heavyweight Championship.
Win	7–0	Jorge Oliveira	KO (slam)	WEC 17	October 14, 2005	1		Lemoore, California, United States	
Win	6–0	Tony Lopez	Submission (rear naked choke)	WEC 15	May 19, 2005	1	3:46	Lemoore, California, United States	
Win	5–0	Tosh Cook	Submission (triangle choke)	Cold Fury 35	March 13, 2005	1	3:56	Porterville, California, United States	
Win	4–0	Eber Saulido	TKO	Total Combat 7	January 29, 2005	1		Tijuana, Mexico	
Win	3–0	Mitch Nester	TKO	Gladiator Challenge 33	December 12, 2004	1	1:02	Porterville, California, United States	
Win	2–0	Jeff Dowmam	KO (kick)	Gladiator Challenge 28	June 22, 2004	1	0:09	Porterville, California, United States	
Win	1–0	Hector Carrilo	TKO	Total Combat 3	May 30, 2004	1	2:00	Tijuana, Mexico	
