= Richard Crunkilton =

American mixed martial arts fighter

Richard Crunkilton Jr
- Born: November 25, 1979 (age 46); Ft. Lauderdale, Florida, United States
- Other names: Cleat
- Nationality: American
- Height: 5 ft 7 in (1.70 m)
- Weight: 155 lb (70 kg; 11.1 st)
- Division: Lightweight
- Reach: 73 in (185 cm)
- Fighting out of: New Smyrna Beach, Florida
- Team: New Smyrna Beach Mixed Martial Arts, American Kickboxing Academy
- Rank: Black belt in Brazilian jiu-jitsu Black belt in Judo
- Years active: 1999–2013

Mixed martial arts record
- Total: 23
- Wins: 19
- By knockout: 8
- By submission: 7
- By decision: 4
- Losses: 4
- By knockout: 2
- By decision: 2

Other information
- Mixed martial arts record from Sherdog

Richard Allan Crunkilton Jr (born November 25, 1979) is an American mixed martial artist. Crunkilton is perhaps best known for his 8–2 stint with the World Extreme Cagefighting promotion. He currently competes in the Lightweight division.

== Early career ==
Crunkilton made his professional MMA debut in October 1999, defeating Ray Totorico via TKO. Following this, Crunkilton would compile a record of 8–0 before signing with the World Extreme Cagefighting promotion in 2002.

=== World Extreme Cagefighting ===
Crunkilton made his debut on June 7, 2002, at WEC 3, defeating Cruz Gomez via first-round TKO. He then made a quick turnaround and faced Luciano Oliveira at WEC 4 on August 31, 2002. He won the fight via armbar submission.

Crunkilton then defeated Victor Estrada at WEC 5: Halloween Havoc on October 18, 2002, due to an ankle injury.

=== Ultimate Fighting Championship ===
With an impressive undefeated record of 11–0, Crunkilton signed with the UFC and faced Hermes França at UFC 42 on April 25, 2003. Though Crunkilton was the moderate favorite coming into the fight, he would lose the fight via unanimous decision and was subsequently released shortly after.

=== Return to WEC ===
Following a short stint in the UFC, Crunkilton returned at WEC 15 on May 19, 2005, defeating Paul Jenkins via KO. He faced Nick Ertl at WEC 18: Unfinished Business on January 13, 2006. He won the fight via TKO, advancing his WEC to 5–0.

He then faced Adam Lynn at WEC 21 on June 15, 2006. He won the fight via rear-naked choke. Crunkilton won his next fight against Mike Joy at WEC 25 on January 20, 2007, via D'arce choke.

Crunkilton lost his first fight in the WEC on September 5, 2007, when he lost to Rob McCullough via TKO for the WEC Lightweight Championship at WEC 30.

He defeated Sergio Gomez on March 26, 2008, at WEC 33. He was scheduled to face Donald Cerrone at WEC 34, but was forced off the card with an injury. Crunkilton was forced to withdraw from his bout with Bart Palaszewski at WEC 39 because of a knee injury. He was again scheduled to fight Donald Cerrone on June 7, 2009, at WEC 41, but dropped out due to another undisclosed injury.

Crunkilton made his return from injury at WEC 43 where he lost by decision to WEC newcomer Dave Jansen.

Shortly after his defeat at WEC 43, Crunkilton was released from the promotion.

=== Post-WEC ===
In his first fight since leaving the WEC, Crunkilton faced UFC veteran Carlo Prater at the Shine: Lightweight Grand Prix on September 10, 2010. He won the fight via split decision. After a three-year hiatus, Crunkilton returned to MMA and faced Akhmet Aliev at Fight Nights: Battle of Moscow 14 on December 7, 2013. Crunkilton lost the fight via KO.

== Mixed martial arts record ==
Professional record breakdown
23 matches	19 wins	4 losses
By knockout	8	2
By submission	7	0
By decision	4	2

Res.	Record	Opponent	Method	Event	Date	Round	Time	Location	Notes
Loss	19–4	Akhmet Aliev	KO (punch)	Fight Nights - Battle of Moscow 14	December 7, 2013	1	1:15	Moscow, Russia	
Win	19–3	Carlo Prater	Decision (split)	Shine: Lightweight Grand Prix	September 10, 2010	3	5:00	Newkirk, Oklahoma, United States	
Loss	18–3	Dave Jansen	Decision (unanimous)	WEC 43	October 10, 2009	3	5:00	San Antonio, Texas, United States	
Win	18–2	Sergio Gomez	Decision (unanimous)	WEC 33: Marshall vs. Stann	March 26, 2008	3	5:00	Las Vegas, Nevada, United States	
Loss	17–2	Rob McCullough	TKO (punches)	WEC 30	September 5, 2007	1	1:29	Las Vegas, Nevada, United States	For the WEC Lightweight Championship.
Win	17–1	Mike Joy	Submission (D'arce choke)	WEC 25	January 20, 2007	3	4:23	Las Vegas, Nevada, United States	
Win	16–1	Adam Lynn	Submission (rear-naked choke)	WEC 21: Tapout	June 15, 2006	2	1:20	Highland, California, United States	
Win	15–1	Nick Ertl	TKO (punches)	WEC 18: Unfinished Business	January 13, 2006	2	3:55	Lemoore, California, United States	
Win	14–1	James Martinez	TKO (punches)	Freedom Fight - Canada vs USA	July 9, 2005	1	3:31	Quebec, Canada	
Win	13–1	Paul Jenkins	KO (punches)	WEC 15	May 19, 2005	2	2:36	Lemoore, California, United States	
Win	12–1	Peter Kaljevic	Submission (armbar)	Real Fighting Championships 1	February 18, 2005	1	3:44	Tampa, Florida, United States	
Loss	11–1	Hermes França	Decision (unanimous)	UFC 42	April 25, 2003	3	5:00	Miami, Florida, United States	
Win	11–0	Víctor Estrada	Submission (ankle injury)	WEC 5: Halloween Havoc	October 18, 2002	1	1:13	Lemoore, California, United States	
Win	10–0	Luciano Oliveira	Submission (armbar)	WEC 4	August 31, 2002	1	1:55	Uncasville, Connecticut, United States	
Win	9–0	Cruz Gomez	TKO (punches)	WEC 3	June 7, 2002	1	3:04	Lemoore, California, United States	
Win	8–0	Bao Quach	KO (punches)	UA 2 - The Gathering	March 16, 2002	2	1:20	Cabazon, California, United States	
Win	7–0	Aaron Jerome	TKO (punches)	RITR - Rumble in the Rockies	January 26, 2002	1	1:00	Denver, Colorado, United States	
Win	6–0	Eric Hibler	Decision	RSF 1 - Redemption in the Valley	April 21, 2001	3	4:00	Wheeling, West Virginia, United States	
Win	5–0	Zviad Abuseridze	Submission (triangle choke)	WEF - World Extreme Fighting: Rumble at the Rodeo 2	March 17, 2001	2	1:17	Kissimmee, Florida, United States	
Win	4–0	Leonard Speights	KO (punches)	WEF - World Extreme Fighting: Rumble at the Rodeo 1	December 16, 2000	1	N/A	United States	
Win	3–0	Scott Johnson	Submission (kneebar)	WVF - Battlejax	August 26, 2000	1	5:19	Jacksonville, Florida, United States	
Win	2–0	Robert Irizarry	Decision (unanimous)	WEF - New Blood Conflict	August 26, 2000	3	3:00	United States	
Win	1–0	Ray Totorico	TKO (punches)	WEF 7 - Stomp in the Swamp	October 9, 1999	2	2:24	Kenner, Louisiana, United States	
