= Brian Olsen =

American mixed martial artist (born 1975)

- Born: 1974 or 1975 (age 51–52); Enfield, Connecticut, United States
- Height: 6 ft 1 in (1.85 m)
- Weight: 200 lb (91 kg; 14 st)
- Division: Heavyweight; Light Heavyweight
- Fighting out of: Enfield, Connecticut
- Team: Team Link; Strike Zone
- Years active: 2004–2008

Mixed martial arts record
- Total: 10
- Wins: 9
- By knockout: 7
- By decision: 1
- By disqualification: 1
- Losses: 1
- By knockout: 1

Other information
- Mixed martial arts record from Sherdog

Brian Olsen (born 1975) is an American former mixed martial artist. A professional from 2004 until 2008, he was the last WEC Heavyweight Champion before it was abolished when Zuffa purchased the organization.

== Mixed martial arts career ==
=== World Extreme Cagefighting ===
Olsen made his debut against Craig Zellner on March 17, 2005 at WEC 14: Vengeance. He defeated Zellner via TKO in the second round.

Olsen fought for the vacant WEC heavyweight title against Lavar Johnson on January 13, 2006 at WEC 18: Unfinished Business. He defeated Johnson via submission due to a knee injury and became the new heavyweight champion.

Olsen made a title defense against Mike Kyle on May 5, 2006 at WEC 20: Cinco de Mayhem. Kyle was disqualified after hitting Olsen with illegal strikes, for which he was placed on the national suspension list by CSAC.

Olsen remained as the last WEC heavyweight champion, because Zuffa abolished the heavyweight division from WEC after it was purchased.

=== Post-WEC ===
Olsen fought twice for Canadian's promotion Ultimate Generation Combat. He defeated J.R. Alexander and Mike Marshalleck, both via TKO in the first round.

Olsen faced Fernando Rivera on May 9, 2008 at USFL: War in the Woods 3. He won via TKO early in the first round.

== Championships and accomplishments ==
- World Extreme Cagefighting
  - WEC Heavyweight Championship (One time; last)
    - One successful title defense

== Mixed martial arts record ==
Professional record breakdown
10 matches	9 wins	1 loss
By knockout	7	1
By decision	1	0
By disqualification	1	0

Res.	Record	Opponent	Method	Event	Date	Round	Time	Location	Notes
Win	9–1	Fernando Rivera	TKO (punches)	USFL: War in the Woods 3	May 9, 2008	1	1:41	Ledyard, Connecticut, United States	Catchweight (195 lbs) bout.
Win	8–1	Mike Marshalleck	TKO (strikes)	Ultimate Generation Combat 17	March 3, 2007	1	1:26	Montreal, Quebec, Canada	
Win	7–1	J.R. Alexander	TKO (strikes)	Ultimate Generation Combat 16	December 16, 2006	1	0:08	Montreal, Quebec, Canada	
Win	6–1	Mike Kyle	DQ (strikes after the bell)	WEC 20: Cinco de Mayhem	May 5, 2006	1	5:00	Lemoore, California, United States	Defended the WEC Heavyweight Championship.
Win	5–1	Lavar Johnson	TKO (knee injury)	WEC 18: Unfinished Business	January 13, 2006	2	0:14	Lemoore, California, United States	Won the vacant WEC Heavyweight Championship.
Loss	4–1	Ibragim Magomedov	KO (punch)	Euphoria: USA vs. Russia	May 14, 2005	1	3:32	Atlantic City, New Jersey, United States	
Win	4–0	Glenn Sandull	TKO (punches)	Reality Fighting 8	April 2, 2005	1	N/A	Atlantic City, New Jersey, United States	Won the vacant Reality Fighting Heavyweight Championship.
Win	3–0	Craig Zellner	TKO (punches)	WEC 14: Vengeance	March 17, 2005	1	2:14	Lemoore, California, United States	
Win	2–0	Tyler Oleksak	TKO (punches)	Mass Destruction 18	December 11, 2004	1	N/A	Boston, Massachusetts, United States	
Win	1–0	Jed Tinlin	Decision (split)	ECFA: Halloween Throwdown	October 30, 2004	N/A	N/A	Taunton, Massachusetts, United States	
