= Antonio Banuelos =

American mixed martial arts fighter

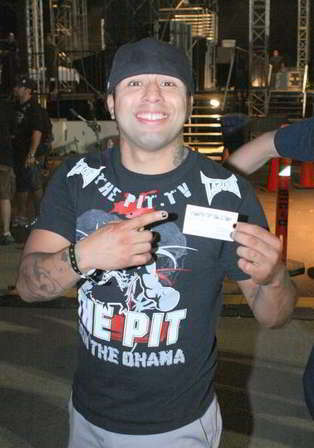
- Born: Juan Antonio Banuelos; September 23, 1979 (age 47); Tulare, California, United States
- Height: 5 ft 3 in (1.60 m)
- Weight: 125 lb (57 kg; 8.9 st)
- Division: Bantamweight; Flyweight
- Reach: 63 in (160 cm)
- Style: Kajukenbo, Wrestling
- Fighting out of: Arroyo Grande, California
- Team: The Pit
- Wrestling: NCAA Division I Wrestling
- Years active: 2001–2014

Mixed martial arts record
- Total: 32
- Wins: 20
- By knockout: 7
- By submission: 1
- By decision: 12
- Losses: 11
- By knockout: 5
- By submission: 2
- By decision: 4
- Draws: 1

Other information
- Mixed martial arts record from Sherdog

Juan Antonio Banuelos (born September 23, 1979) is an American former mixed martial artist who competed in the Bantamweight division.

== Mixed martial arts career ==
Banuelos made his professional mixed martial arts debut in June 2001, knocking out Daniel Garlets at IFC Warriors Challenge 13. Following the impressive win, Banuelos would compile a record of 3–1 before signing with World Extreme Cagefighting in 2002.

=== World Extreme Cagefighting ===
Banuelos is perhaps best known for being a longtime competitor for World Extreme Cagefighting, making his debut at WEC 5: Halloween Havoc. He fought a record 14 times under the promotion, compiling a record of 9–5. His 9 WEC wins are also a promotional record, which he shares with Urijah Faber and Poppies Martinez.

Banuelos was defeated by Eddie Wineland for the first ever WEC Bantamweight Championship at WEC 20.

After the Wineland bout, Banuelos defeated Cole Escovedo, Mike French and Justin Robbins while dropping contests against Charlie Valencia and a controversial decision to Manny Tapia at WEC 32.

Banuelos defeated Scott Jorgensen via split decision at WEC 41 in a fight that many, including WEC general manager Reed Harris has speculated is a candidate for fight of the year.

Banuelos improved to 8–4 in the WEC after defeating Kenji Osawa via unanimous decision on November 18, 2009, at WEC 44.

Banuelos was scheduled to face Damacio Page on April 24, 2010, at WEC 48, but Page was forced off the card with an injury. Banuelos instead faced Jorgensen in a rematch of their bout from WEC 41 which Banuelos won via split decision. Banuelos lost the rematch by unanimous decision.

Banuelos faced Chad George on September 30, 2010, at WEC 51. He won the fight via unanimous decision.

=== Ultimate Fighting Championship ===
On October 28, 2010, World Extreme Cagefighting merged with the Ultimate Fighting Championship. As part of the merger, all WEC fighters were transferred to the UFC.

Banuelos made his promotional debut against the former WEC Bantamweight Champion Miguel Torres on February 5, 2011, at UFC 126. Banuelos struggled with the height and reach advantage of Torres and was unable to mount any significant offense until the latter half of the final round. He lost the fight via unanimous decision, and was subsequently released from the promotion.

=== Legacy Fighting Championship ===
After going 2–1 outside of the UFC, Banuelos signed with Texas based promotion Legacy FC. He faced Josh Sampo in his flyweight debut at Legacy FC 14 on September 14, 2012. He lost the fight via unanimous decision.

In his second fight within the promotion, Banuelos faced Rafael de Freitas at Legacy FC 18 on March 1, 2013. After three hard fought rounds, the bout was ruled a split draw. Banuelos faced Alptekin Ozkilic at Legacy FC 20 on May 31, 2013. He lost the fight via first round TKO, dropping his third straight fight in the process.

== Championships and accomplishments ==
- World Extreme Cagefighting
  - WEC North American Bantamweight Championship (One time)

== Mixed martial arts record ==
Professional record breakdown
32 matches	20 wins	11 losses
By knockout	7	5
By submission	1	2
By decision	12	4
Draws	1	

Res.	Record	Opponent	Method	Event	Date	Round	Time	Location	Notes
Loss	20–11–1	Joby Sanchez	TKO (corner stoppage)	Tachi Palace Fights 20	August 7, 2014	2	2:41	Lemoore, California, United States	
Loss	20–10–1	Alp Ozkilic	TKO (punches)	Legacy Fighting Championship 20	May 31, 2013	1	0:30	Corpus Christi, Texas, United States	
Draw	20–9–1	Rafael De Freitas	Draw (split)	Legacy Fighting Championship 18	March 1, 2013	3	5:00	Houston, Texas, United States	
Loss	20–9	Joshua Sampo	Decision (unanimous)	Legacy Fighting Championships 14	September 14, 2012	3	5:00	Houston, Texas, United States	Flyweight debut
Loss	20–8	Bibiano Fernandes	TKO (punches)	Fight For Japan: Genki Desu Ka Omisoka 2011	December 31, 2011	1	1:21	Saitama, Japan	DREAM Bantamweight Grand Prix Final.
Win	20–7	Masakazu Imanari	Decision (split)	Fight For Japan: Genki Desu Ka Omisoka 2011	December 31, 2011	2	5:00	Saitama, Japan	DREAM Bantamweight Grand Prix Semifinal.
Win	19–7	Hideo Tokoro	Decision (split)	Dream 17	September 24, 2011	3	5:00	Saitama, Japan	DREAM Bantamweight Grand Prix Quarterfinal.
Loss	18–7	Miguel Torres	Decision (unanimous)	UFC 126	February 5, 2011	3	5:00	Las Vegas, Nevada, United States	
Win	18–6	Chad George	Decision (unanimous)	WEC 51	September 30, 2010	3	5:00	Broomfield, Colorado, United States	
Loss	17–6	Scott Jorgensen	Decision (unanimous)	WEC 48	April 24, 2010	3	5:00	Sacramento, California, United States	
Win	17–5	Kenji Osawa	Decision (unanimous)	WEC 44	November 18, 2009	3	5:00	Las Vegas, Nevada, United States	
Win	16–5	Scott Jorgensen	Decision (split)	WEC 41	June 7, 2009	3	5:00	Sacramento, California, United States	
Win	15–5	Bryan Goldsby	KO (punch)	PFC 10: Explosive	September 26, 2008	2	0:59	Lemoore, California, United States	
Loss	14–5	Manny Tapia	Decision (split)	WEC 32: Condit vs. Prater	February 13, 2008	3	5:00	Rio Rancho, New Mexico, United States	
Win	14–4	Justin Robbins	Decision (unanimous)	WEC 29	August 5, 2007	3	5:00	Las Vegas, Nevada, United States	
Loss	13–4	Charlie Valencia	KO (punch)	WEC 26: Condit vs. Alessio	March 24, 2007	1	3:12	Las Vegas, Nevada, United States	
Win	13–3	Mike French	Decision (unanimous)	WEC 25	January 20, 2007	3	5:00	Las Vegas, Nevada, United States	
Win	12–3	Cole Escovedo	Decision (unanimous)	WEC 23: Hot August Fights	August 17, 2006	3	5:00	Lemoore, California, United States	
Loss	11–3	Eddie Wineland	KO (head kick and punches)	WEC 20: Cinco de Mayhem	May 5, 2006	1	2:36	Lemoore, California, United States	For the inaugural WEC Bantamweight Championship.
Win	11–2	James Cottrell	Decision (unanimous)	WEC 19: Undisputed	March 17, 2006	3	5:00	Lemoore, California, United States	
Win	10–2	Kimihito Nonaka	TKO (punches)	FFCF 5: Unleashed	January 27, 2006	1	1:00	Mangilao, Guam	
Win	9–2	Justin Tavernini	Decision (unanimous)	Ultimate Cage Wars 3	October 22, 2005	3	5:00	Winnipeg, Manitoba, Canada	
Win	8–2	Ed Tomaselli	TKO (cut)	WEC 17	October 14, 2005	1	2:25	Lemoore, California, United States	
Win	7–2	Mike Lindquist	Submission (rear naked choke)	WEC 14	March 17, 2005	1	1:38	Lemoore, California, United States	
Win	6–2	Brandon Shuey	TKO (punches)	SF 6: Battleground in Reno	September 23, 2004	1	0:22	Reno, Nevada, United States	
Win	5–2	Yobie Song	TKO (cut)	Rumble on the Rock 4	October 10, 2003	3	2:39	Honolulu, Hawaii, United States	
Win	4–2	Jim Kikuchi	Decision (unanimous)	Rumble on the Rock 2	March 15, 2003	2	5:00	Honolulu, Hawaii, United States	
Loss	3–2	Jeff Bedard	Submission (guillotine choke)	WEC 5: Halloween Havoc	October 18, 2002	1	0:43	Lemoore, California, United States	
Win	3–1	Steve Hecht	Decision (unanimous)	UAGF 1: Ultimate Cage Fighting 1	May 9, 2002	2	5:00	Los Angeles, California, United States	
Loss	2–1	Stephen Palling	Submission (triangle choke)	Warriors Quest 2: Battle of Champions	August 1, 2001	1	0:38	Honolulu, Hawaii, United States	
Win	2–0	Brian Peterson	KO	IFC Warriors Challenge 14	July 18, 2001	3	1:51	Fresno, California, United States	
Win	1–0	Daniel Garlets	TKO (punches)	IFC Warriors Challenge 13	June 15, 2001	1	N/A	Oroville, California, United States	
