= Ron Waterman =

American mixed martial artist and professional wrestler

Personal information
- Born: November 23, 1965 (age 60) Colorado, United States

Professional wrestling career
- Ring name: Ron Waterman
- Billed height: 6 ft 2 in (1.88 m)
- Billed weight: 260 lb (120 kg)
- Trained by: Ohio Valley Wrestling
- Debut: 2000
- Retired: 2005

Ron Waterman
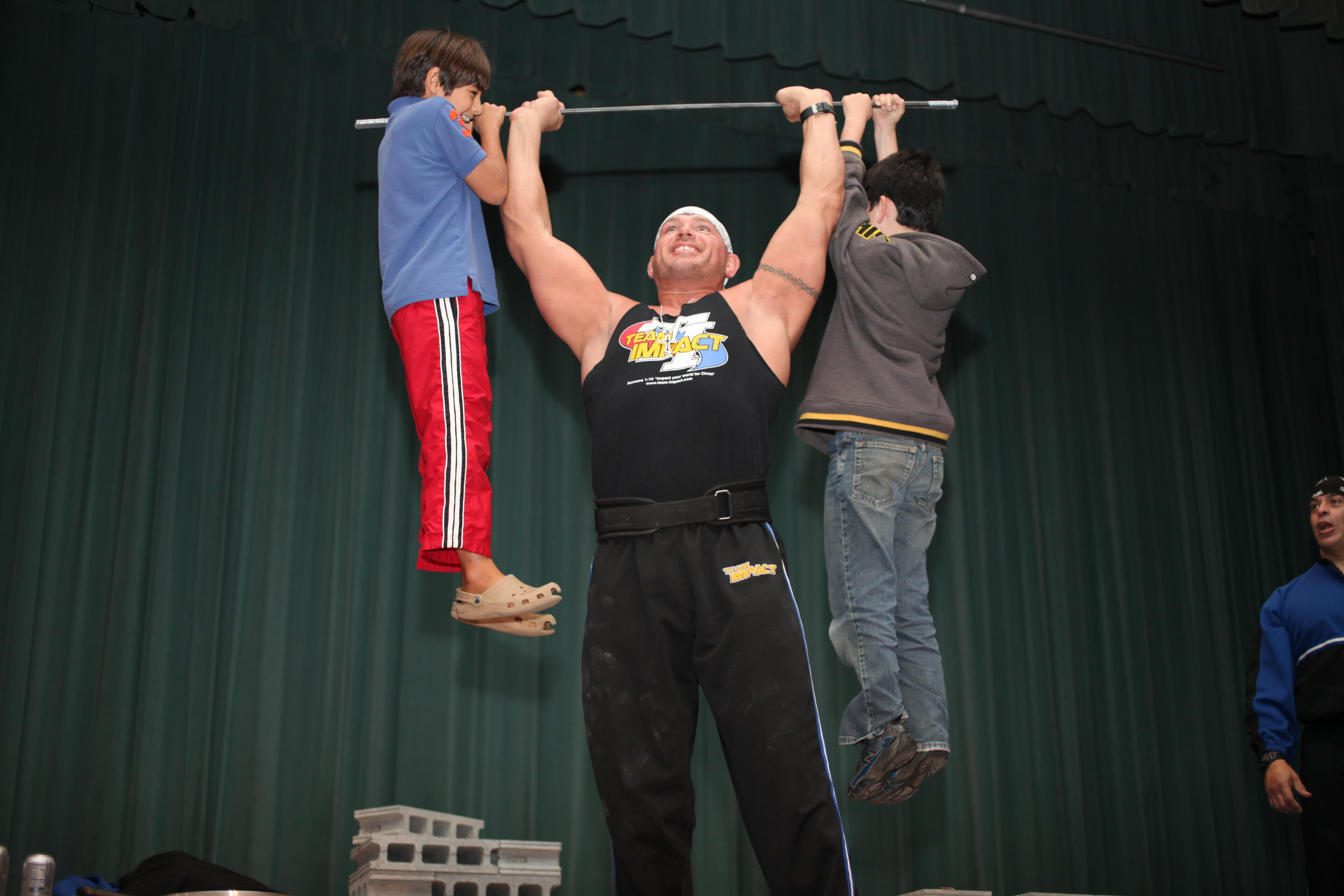
- Born: November 23, 1965 (age 60); Colorado, United States
- Other names: H2O
- Nationality: American
- Height: 6 ft 2 in (188 cm)
- Weight: 260 lb (118 kg; 18 st 8 lb)
- Division: Heavyweight; Super Heavyweight
- Style: Wrestling
- Fighting out of: Greeley, Colorado
- Team: Colorado Stars
- Rank: Black belt in Pancrase Mixed Martial Arts
- Years active: 1999–2008

Mixed martial arts record
- Total: 24
- Wins: 16
- By knockout: 6
- By submission: 8
- By decision: 2
- Losses: 6
- By knockout: 4
- By submission: 1
- By decision: 1
- Draws: 2

Other information
- Mixed martial arts record from Sherdog

Ronald Michael Waterman (born November 23, 1965) is an American former mixed martial artist, professional wrestler, and celebrity member of the Team Impact motivational group. He holds notable victories over Valentijn Overeem, Ricco Rodriguez, Kevin Randleman, and Mario Rinaldi. He was the only WEC Super Heavyweight Champion.

== Career ==
Waterman began his career as a high school art teacher and wrestling coach eventually entering the professional MMA arena and becoming a veteran fighter of the UFC. He received a black belt in Pancrase Mixed Martial Arts on January 2, 2000.

Later, Ron moved on to the pro wrestling scene via Ohio Valley Wrestling in 2000 where he honed his skills during a developmental deal with World Wrestling Entertainment. Waterman went on to tour with the WWE doing house and dark matches across the country in late 2001 and early 2002. After WWE, Waterman wrestled for New Japan Pro-Wrestling for several matches in 2005, while simultaneously maintaining a career in MMA and making regular appearances with Team Impact. He left wrestling after his stint in New Japan Pro-Wrestling.

In his last fight he beat fellow American Mark Smith by arm triangle choke submission on November 29, 2008.

He was the high school wrestling coach of former UFC interim Heavyweight Champion Shane Carwin and helped train Carwin for UFC 116.

== Personal life ==
Waterman is of English, Swedish, German, Finnish, Norwegian, Dutch, descents. He is currently a firefighter and paramedic.

== Championships and accomplishments ==
=== Mixed martial arts ===
- World Extreme Cagefighting
  - WEC Super Heavyweight Championship (One time, first; only)
  - One successful title defense
- X-1 Events
  - X-1 Heavyweight Championship (One time)
- Ultimate Fighting Championship
  - UFC Encyclopedia Awards
    - Fight of the Night (One time) vs. Andre Roberts

=== Professional wrestling ===
- New Japan Pro-Wrestling
  - NJPW Ultimate Royal (2005) (submission only tournament)

== Mixed martial arts record ==
Professional record breakdown
24 matches	16 wins	6 losses
By knockout	6	4
By submission	8	1
By decision	2	1
Draws	2	

Res.	Record	Opponent	Method	Event	Date	Round	Time	Location	Notes
Win	16–6–2	Mark Smith	Submission (arm-triangle choke)	BTBB - Born to be Bad	November 29, 2008	2	2:16	Loveland, Colorado, United States	
Loss	15–6–2	Dave Herman	TKO (punches)	EliteXC: Return of the King	June 14, 2008	1	2:19	Honolulu, Hawaii, United States	
Win	15–5–2	Analu Brash	Submission (americana)	X-1 Events - Champions	January 26, 2008	2	2:10	Honolulu, Hawaii, United States	Won the X-1 Heavyweight Championship.
Win	14–5–2	Mario Rinaldi	TKO (punches)	AOW - Art of War 3	September 1, 2007	1	4:39	Dallas, Texas, United States	
Loss	13–5–2	Roger Gracie	Submission (armbar)	Bodog Fight - USA vs Russia	December 2, 2006	1	3:38	Vancouver, British Columbia, Canada	
Loss	13–4–2	Ricco Rodriguez	TKO (doctor stoppage)	WFA: King of the Streets	July 22, 2006	1	5:00	Los Angeles, California, United States	
Win	13–3–2	Ricco Rodriguez	Decision (unanimous)	WEC 16 - Clash of the Titans 2	August 18, 2005	3	5:00	Lemoore, California, United States	Defended the WEC Super Heavyweight Championship.
Loss	12–3–2	Tsuyoshi Kohsaka	Decision (unanimous)	Pancrase: Brave 10	November 7, 2004	3	5:00	Tokyo, Japan	For the inaugural Pancrase Super Heavyweight Championship.
Win	12–2–2	Kevin Randleman	Submission (americana)	Pride Final Conflict 2004	August 15, 2004	1	7:44	Saitama, Japan	
Win	11–2–2	Keigo Takamori	Submission (americana)	Pancrase: Brave 5	May 28, 2004	1	1:36	Tokyo, Japan	
Loss	10–2–2	Mirko Cro Cop	TKO (punches and soccer kicks)	PRIDE 27	February 1, 2004	1	4:37	Osaka, Japan	
Draw	10–1–2	Jimmy Ambriz	Draw	Pancrase - Hybrid 10	November 30, 2003	3	5:00	Tokyo, Japan	
Win	10–1–1	Jun Ishii	Submission (neck crank)	Pancrase - Hybrid 9	October 31, 2003	1	1:02	Tokyo, Japan	
Win	9–1–1	Jerry Vrbanovic	Submission (shoulder lock)	IFC - Global Domination	September 6, 2003	3	N/A	Denver, Colorado, United States	
Win	8–1–1	James Nevarez	TKO (punches)	WEC 7: This Time It's Personal	August 9, 2003	3	2:31	Lemoore, California, United States	Won the inaugural WEC Super Heavyweight Championship.
Win	7–1–1	Valentijn Overeem	Submission (americana)	PRIDE 24	December 23, 2002	1	2:18	Fukuoka, Japan	
Win	6–1–1	Kengo Watanabe	Submission (americana)	Pancrase - 2002 Anniversary Show	September 29, 2002	1	2:33	Yokohama, Japan	
Win	5–1–1	Satoshi Honma	Decision (unanimous)	UFC 25	April 14, 2000	3	5:00	Tokyo, Japan	
Draw	4–1–1	Tim Lajcik	Draw	UFC 22	September 24, 1999	3	5:00	Lake Charles, Louisiana, United States	
Loss	4–1	Andre Roberts	KO (punches)	UFC 21	July 16, 1999	1	2:51	Cedar Rapids, Iowa, United States	
Win	4–0	Chris Condo	TKO (punches)	UFC 20	May 7, 1999	1	0:28	Birmingham, Alabama, United States	
Win	3–0	Joshua Jenkins	TKO (doctor stoppage)	BRI 1 - Bas Rutten Invitational 1	February 6, 1999	1	1:14	United States	
Win	2–0	Daniel James	TKO (punches)	BRI 1 - Bas Rutten Invitational 1	February 6, 1999	1	0:20	United States	
Win	1–0	Matt Asher	TKO (punches)	BRI 1 - Bas Rutten Invitational 1	February 6, 1999	1	0:28	United States	

New championship	1st WEC Super Heavyweight Champion; August 9, 2003 - December, 2006	Vacant WEC Super Heavyweight division was abolished
