= Poppies Martinez =

American mixed martial arts fighter (born 1983)

- Born: Juvencio Poppies Martinez; August 19, 1983 (age 43); Lemoore, California, United States
- Other names: The Tachi Kid
- Nationality: American
- Height: 5 ft 9 in (175 cm)
- Weight: 145 lb (66 kg; 10 st 5 lb)
- Division: Featherweight (145 lb); Lightweight (155 lb); Welterweight (170 lb)
- Reach: 64 in (163 cm)
- Fighting out of: Lemoore, California, United States
- Team: Thrive MMA
- Rank: Black belt in Kenpo Karate
- Years active: 2003–present

Professional boxing record
- Total: 3
- Wins: 3
- By knockout: 1

Mixed martial arts record
- Total: 41
- Wins: 29
- By knockout: 8
- By submission: 18
- By decision: 3
- Losses: 11
- By knockout: 4
- By submission: 7
- No contests: 1

Other information
- Boxing record from BoxRec
- Mixed martial arts record from Sherdog

Poppies Martinez (born August 19, 1983) is a Native American professional mixed martial artist of the Tachi Yokuts tribe currently competing in the Lightweight division of Bellator. A professional competitor since 2003, he has also formerly competed for the California-based promotions, the WEC, Palace Fighting Championship, and Tachi Palace Fights.

== Background ==
Born and raised in Lemoore, California, Martinez competed in wrestling at Lemoore High School. Martinez has also trained in Kenpo Karate and holds a black belt.

== Mixed martial arts career ==
=== Early career: World Extreme Cagefighting ===
Martinez began training in mixed martial arts at the age of 19 and made his professional debut in 2003 for the WEC. Martinez fought exclusively for the promotion until 2006.

=== Palace Fighting Championship and Tachi Palace Fights ===
From 2007 to 2014, Martinez fought mainly for Palace Fighting Championship, and after the organization's end, Tachi Palace Fights. Both organizations held most of their events in Tachi Palace Hotel & Casino at Martinez's hometown in Lemoore, California.

Martinez fought for the PFC Lightweight Championship on March 22, 2007, at PFC 2 against Shad Smith. He lost via submission due to a guillotine choke in the third round.

Martinez was scheduled to rematch Shad Smith on October 18, 2007, at PFC 4 for the PFC Lightweight Championship. However, Smith was forced to pull out of the bout after being medically suspended by CSAC. Martinez was rescheduled to face Brandon Jinnies at the same event for the PFC Interim Lightweight Championship. He won via TKO early in the first round and became the PFC interim lightweight title holder.

Once again, Martinez fought for the PFC Lightweight Championship on January 17, 2008, at PFC 6 against Diego Saraiva and was defeated via submission due to a rear-naked choke in the first round.

Martinez faced David Mitchell on July 9, 2010, at TPF 5: Stars and Strikes for the welterweight title. He lost via technical submission due to a triangle choke early in the first round.

Martinez faced Christos Giagos on August 22, 2013, at TPF 16: The Return for the vacant TPF Lightweight Championship. Martinez defeated Giagos via submission due to a guillotine choke in the first round and became the new Lightweight Champion.

Martinez also faced Chris Culley on February 6, 2014, at TPF 18: Martinez vs. Culley for the vacant TPF Featherweight Championship. He won via submission due to an anaconda choke in the first round and became the only fighter to hold two TPF belts simultaneously.

=== Bellator MMA ===
Martinez made his promotional debut on October 4, 2013, at Bellator 102 against Brandon Girtz. He lost via submission due to an armbar early in the first round.

Martinez next faced Josh Smith on April 11, 2014, at Bellator 116. He won via submission due to a guillotine choke at 3:50 of round one.

In his third fight within the promotion, Martinez faced Bubba Jenkins at Bellator 122 on July 25, 2014. He lost the fight via first-round TKO.

Martinez faced Julio Cesar Neves on September 19, 2014, at Bellator 125. He lost via TKO in the first round.

== Personal life ==
Martinez, who is married, has eight children and his brother, Andrew "Mickey" Martinez, is also a professional mixed martial artist who has competed for Tachi Palace Fights. Mickey competes in the Heavyweight division.

== Championships and accomplishments ==
=== Mixed martial arts ===
- Tachi Palace Fights
  - TPF Lightweight Championship (One time; current)
  - TPF Featherweight Championship (One time; current)
- Palace Fighting Championship
  - PFC Interim Lightweight Championship (One time)

== Mixed martial arts record ==
Professional record breakdown
41 matches	29 wins	11 losses
By knockout	8	4
By submission	18	7
By decision	3	0
No contests	1	

Res.	Record	Opponent	Method	Event	Date	Round	Time	Location	Notes
Loss	29–11 (1)	Julio Cesar Neves	TKO (punches)	Bellator 125	September 19, 2014	1	2:16	Fresno, California, United States	Featherweight bout.
Loss	29–10 (1)	Bubba Jenkins	TKO (punches)	Bellator 122	July 25, 2014	1	4:10	Temecula, California, United States	
Win	29–9 (1)	Josh Smith	Submission (guillotine choke)	Bellator 116	April 11, 2014	1	3:50	Temecula, California, United States	Return to Lightweight.
Win	28–9 (1)	Chris Culley	Submission (anaconda choke)	Tachi Palace Fights 18: Martinez vs. Culley	February 6, 2014	1	3:31	Lemoore, California, United States	Won vacant TPF Featherweight Championship.
Loss	27–9 (1)	Brandon Girtz	Submission (armbar)	Bellator 102	October 4, 2013	1	1:20	Visalia, California, United States	
Win	27–8 (1)	Christos Giagos	Submission (guillotine choke)	Tachi Palace Fights 16: The Return	August 22, 2013	1	4:27	Lemoore, California, United States	Won vacant TPF Lightweight Championship.
Win	26–8 (1)	John Bond	Submission	Gladiator Challenge: Battleground	March 24, 2013	1	1:10	San Jacinto, California, United States	
Win	25–8 (1)	Aaron King	Submission (neck crank)	Gladiator Challenge: Super Fight Night	February 1, 2013	1	0:51	Lincoln, California, United States	
Win	24–8 (1)	Fernando Bernstein	Decision (unanimous)	Tachi Palace Fights 15: Collision Course	November 15, 2012	3	5:00	Lemoore, California, United States	
Win	23–8 (1)	Mike Ryan	TKO (punches)	Gladiator Challenge: Heat Returns	October 28, 2012	1	1:46	San Jacinto, California, United States	
Win	22–8 (1)	Alec Borilia	TKO (punches)	Gladiator Challenge	September 29, 2012	1	0:50	San Diego, California, United States	
Win	21–8 (1)	Jason Drake	Submission (heel hook)	Tachi Palace Fights 14: Validation	September 7, 2012	1	1:48	Lemoore, California, United States	
Win	20–8 (1)	Raymond Doxie	TKO (doctor stoppage)	Gladiator Challenge: World Class	June 23, 2012	2	1:53	Lincoln, California, United States	
Loss	19–8 (1)	Tony Llamas	Submission (guillotine choke)	Tachi Palace Fights 13: Unfinished Business	May 10, 2012	1	1:00	Lemoore, California, United States	
Loss	19–7 (1)	David Mitchell	Technical submission (triangle choke)	TPF 5: Stars and Strikes	July 9, 2010	1	1:32	Lemoore, California, United States	For TPF Welterweight Championship.
Win	19–6 (1)	Darren Crisp	Submission (armbar)	TPF 4: Cinco de Mayhem	May 5, 2010	1	2:46	Lemoore, California, United States	
Loss	18–6 (1)	Daniel Romero	Submission (armbar)	Gladiator Challenge: Chain Reaction	December 12, 2009	1	2:59	Placerville, California, United States	
Win	18–5 (1)	Sergio Salcido	Submission (guillotine choke)	TPF 1: Tachi Palace Fights 1	October 8, 2009	2	3:21	Lemoore, California, United States	
Win	17–5 (1)	Tony Llamas	Submission (armbar)	PFC 11: All In	November 20, 2008	1	1:51	Lemoore, California, United States	
Win	16–5 (1)	Sergio Cortez	Decision (unanimous)	PFC 10: Explosive	September 26, 2008	3	3:00	Lemoore, California, United States	
Loss	15–5 (1)	Sergio Cortez	TKO (injury)	PFC 8: A Night of Champions	April 26, 2008	1	2:57	Lemoore, California, United States	
Win	15–4 (1)	Jarod Saenz	Submission (guillotine choke)	PFC 7.5: New Blood	April 26, 2008	1	0:31	Porterville, California, United States	
Loss	14–4 (1)	Diego Saraiva	Submission (rear-naked choke)	PFC 6: No Retreat, No Surrender	January 17, 2008	1	2:08	Lemoore, California, United States	For PFC Lightweight Championship.
Win	14–3 (1)	Billy Terry	Submission (kimura)	Independent Event	December 6, 2007	1	2:35	Lemoore, California, United States	
Win	13–3 (1)	Aaron Maldonado	Submission (guillotine choke)	PFC 5: Beatdown at 4 Bears	November 10, 2007	1	1:22	New Town, North Dakota, United States	Non-title bout.
Win	12–3 (1)	Brandon Jinnies	TKO (punches)	PFC 4: Project Complete	October 18, 2007	1	1:23	Lemoore, California, United States	Won PFC Interim Lightweight Championship.
Win	11–3 (1)	Billy Terry	Submission (rear-naked choke)	Primal MMA: The Next Level	August 11, 2007	1	2:00	Tijuana, Baja California, Mexico	
Loss	10–3 (1)	Shad Smith	Submission (guillotine choke)	PFC 2: Fast and Furious	March 22, 2007	3	1:10	Lemoore, California, United States	For PFC Lightweight Championship.
Win	10–2 (1)	Josh Gardner	Decision (unanimous)	PFC 1: King of the Ring	January 18, 2007	3	3:00	Lemoore, California, United States	
Win	9–2 (1)	Robert Breslin	Submission (guillotine choke)	WEC 24: Full Force	October 12, 2006	1	0:52	Lemoore, California, United States	
Win	8–2 (1)	Gigo Jara	Submission (rear-naked choke)	WEC 23: Hot August Fights	August 17, 2006	2	3:52	Lemoore, California, United States	
Win	7–2 (1)	Troy Miller	Submission (armbar)	WEC 22: The Hitmen	July 28, 2006	1	0:50	Lemoore, California, United States	
Loss	6–2 (1)	Cory Cass	Submission (armbar)	WEC 20: Cinco de Mayhem	May 5, 2006	1	0:47	Lemoore, California, United States	
NC	6–1 (1)	Robert Breslin	No contest (groin strike)	WEC 17: Halloween Fury 4	October 14, 2005	1	0:23	Lemoore, California, United States	Breslin accidentally kicked Martinez in the groin at 0:23 of round one.
Loss	6–1	Cole Escovedo	TKO (leg injury)	WEC 15: Judgment Day	May 19, 2005	2	1:05	Lemoore, California, United States	For Tachi Palace Native American Championship.
Win	6–0	Joe Martin	TKO (punches)	WEC 12: Halloween Fury 3	October 21, 2004	2	4:41	Lemoore, California, United States	
Win	5–0	Gabriel Cruz	Submission (punches)	WEC 10: Bragging Rights	May 21, 2004	1	0:30	Lemoore, California, United States	
Win	4–0	Eric Ramirez	TKO (punches)	WEC 9: Cold Blooded	January 16, 2004	1	3:15	Lemoore, California, United States	
Win	3–0	A.J. Wieman	Submission (rear-naked choke)	WEC 8: Halloween Fury 2	October 17, 2003	1	2:01	Lemoore, California, United States	
Win	2–0	Johnny Fadella	TKO (knees)	WEC 7: This Time It's Personal	August 9, 2003	1	0:51	Lemoore, California, United States	
Win	1–0	Erick Husbands	KO (punches)	WEC 6: Return of a Legend	March 27, 2003	1	0:10	Lemoore, California, United States	

== Professional boxing record ==
3 Wins (1 knockout, 2 decisions), 0 Losses, 0 Draws
Res.	Record	Opponent	Type	Rd., Time	Date	Location	Notes
Win	3–0	(United States) Jovanni Rubio	UD	4	2009-03-21	Playboy Mansion, Beverly Hills, California, United States	
Win	2–0	(United States) Yonas Gebreegziabher	MD	4	2009-02-06	Tachi Palace Hotel & Casino, Lemoore, California, United States	
Win	1–0	(United States) Ben Witthar	TKO	1 (4), 1:32	2008-10-23	Tachi Palace Hotel & Casino, Lemoore, California, United States	

== See also ==
- List of male mixed martial artists
- List of current Bellator fighters
