= Alex Serdyukov =

Russian mixed martial artist

- Born: May 24, 1980 (age 46); Moscow, Russian SFSR, Soviet Union
- Other names: The Russian Crusher
- Nationality: Russian
- Height: 6 ft 2 in (1.88 m)
- Weight: 171 lb (78 kg; 12.2 st)
- Division: Welterweight
- Fighting out of: San Francisco, California, United States
- Team: Fairtex Gym

Mixed martial arts record
- Total: 13
- Wins: 8
- By knockout: 3
- By submission: 4
- By decision: 1
- Losses: 5
- By knockout: 1
- By submission: 2
- By decision: 2

Other information
- Mixed martial arts record from Sherdog

Alex Serdyukov (born May 24, 1980) is a retired Russian mixed martial artist who competed in the Welterweight division. A professional from 2003 until 2009, he competed for the WEC and Palace Fighting Championship.

== Championships and accomplishments ==
- World Extreme Cagefighting
  - WEC North American Welterweight Championship (One time)

== Mixed martial arts record ==
Professional record breakdown
13 matches	8 wins	5 losses
By knockout	3	1
By submission	4	2
By decision	1	2

Res.	Record	Opponent	Method	Event	Date	Round	Time	Location	Notes
Loss	8–5	Johny Hendricks	Decision (unanimous)	WEC 39	March 1, 2009	3	5:00	Corpus Christi, Texas, United States	Fight of the Night.
Win	8–4	Luis Santos	TKO (corner stoppage)	WEC 34: Faber vs. Pulver	June 1, 2008	1	5:00	Sacramento, California, United States	
Win	7–4	Ryan Stonitsch	Submission (triangle choke)	WEC 33: Marshall vs. Stann	March 26, 2008	1	1:15	Las Vegas, Nevada, United States	
Win	6–4	Mike Gates	TKO (punches)	PFC 6: No Retreat, No Surrender	January 17, 2008	2	2:05	Lemoore, California, United States	
Loss	5–4	John Alessio	Submission (guillotine choke)	WEC 28	June 3, 2007	1	1:17	Las Vegas, Nevada, United States	
Win	5–3	Scott Norton	Submission (guillotine choke)	WEC 26: Condit vs. Alessio	March 24, 2007	2	0:57	Las Vegas, Nevada, United States	
Loss	4–3	John Alessio	Submission (rear-naked choke)	WEC 23: Hot August Fights	August 17, 2006	3	1:52	Lemoore, California, United States	
Loss	4–2	Brian Ebersole	Decision (unanimous)	ICFO 1: Stockton	May 13, 2006	3	5:00	Stockton, California, United States	
Win	4–1	Victor Parfenov	TKO (punches)	WEC 16	August 18, 2005	1	2:20	Lemoore, California, United States	Defended WEC North American Middleweight Championship
Win	3–1	Mark Weir	Submission (arm-triangle choke)	WEC 14	March 17, 2005	3	2:56	Lemoore, California, United States	Won WEC North American Middleweight Championship
Loss	2–1	Jon Fitch	TKO (punches)	MMA Mexico: Day 1	December 17, 2004	2	2:15	Juarez, Mexico	
Win	2–0	Miguel Gutierrez	Decision (unanimous)	MMA Mexico: Day 1	December 17, 2004	3	5:00	Juarez, Mexico	
Win	1–0	Harris Sarmiento	Submission (kimura)	KFC 2: Kaos Fighting Championships 2	April 26, 2003	1	N/A	Honolulu, Hawaii, United States	
