= Heavyweight (MMA) =

MMA weight class

The heavyweight division in mixed martial arts (MMA) generally includes fighters between 206–265 lb (93.4–120.2 kg).

Although many ambiguities exist within the lowerweight classes regarding division naming and weight limits, the heavyweight division is, for the most part, uniform. The Ultimate Fighting Championship (UFC) and most other North American MMA organizations such as Bellator MMA, WSOF, and King of the Cage (KOTC) abide by this interpretation to their 206–265 lb athletes as heavyweights. ONE Championship's heavyweight division is at 226–265 lb. Pancrase's overweight division was 198.4–220.5 lb (90.0–100.0 kg) before being revised to its current 205–264.5 lb (93.0–120.0 kg).

The heavyweight upper weight limit, as defined by the Nevada State Athletic Commission and the Association of Boxing Commissions is 265 lb (120 kg).

== Professional champions ==
=== Current champions ===
This table was last updated on June 21, 2025.

Organization	Reign Began	Champion	Record	Defenses
UFC	September 14, 2026	(France) Ciryl Gane	15–2 (1) (7KO 3SUB)	1
PFL	November 14, 2026	(Russia) Sergey Bilostenniy	16–4 (10KO 1SUB)	0
ONE Championship	Vacant			
ACA	March 17, 2023	(Russia) Evgeniy Goncharov	20–7 (8KO 2SUB)	2
KSW	April 14, 2018	(England) Phil De Fries	27–6 (1) (7KO 15SUB)	12

== Most wins in heavyweight title bouts ==
Note: the list includes wins in bouts for heavyweight titles of major promotions (UFC, ONE, Pride, Strikeforce, WEC, PFL)
Note: the list includes both undisputed and interim champions
Active title reign

	Name	Promotion	Title bout wins
1.	(United States) Randy Couture	UFC	6
1.	(United States) Stipe Miocic	UFC	6
2.	(United States) Tim Sylvia	UFC	5
3.	(Russia) Fedor Emelianenko	Pride	4
3.	(United States) Cain Velasquez	UFC	4
4.	(Brazil) Antonio Rodrigo Nogueira	UFC, Pride	3
4.	(Belarus) Andrei Arlovski	UFC	3
4.	(United States) Brandon Vera	ONE	3
4.	(United States) Brock Lesnar	UFC	3
4.	(Cameroon) Francis Ngannou	UFC, PFL	3
5.	(Netherlands) Alistair Overeem	Strikeforce	2
5.	(United States) Frank Mir	UFC	2
5.	(Brazil) Fabricio Werdum	UFC	2
5.	(United States) Kevin Randleman	UFC	2
5.	(United States) Maurice Smith	UFC	2
5.	(United States) Daniel Cormier	UFC	2
5.	(England) Tom Aspinall	UFC	2
5.	(Brazil) Junior Dos Santos	UFC	2
5.	(United States) Ron Waterman	WEC	2
5.	(United States) James Irvin	WEC	2
5.	(United States) Jon Jones	UFC	2

== Most consecutive defenses of heavyweight title ==
	Name	Promotion	Title defenses
1.	(Russia) Fedor Emelianenko	Pride	3
1.	(United States) Stipe Miocic*	UFC	3
3.	(United States) Randy Couture	UFC	2
3.	(United States) Tim Sylvia	UFC	2
3.	(United States) Brandon Vera*	ONE	2
3.	(United States) Brock Lesnar	UFC	2
3.	(United States) Cain Velasquez	UFC	2
8.	(Netherlands) Alistair Overeem	Strikeforce	1
8.	(United States) Daniel Cormier	UFC	1
8.	(Brazil) Junior dos Santos	UFC	1
8.	(Brazil) Fabricio Werdum	UFC	1
8.	(United States) Kevin Randleman	UFC	1
8.	(United States) Maurice Smith	UFC	1
8.	(Cameroon) Francis Ngannou	UFC	1
8.	(United States) Ron Waterman	WEC	1
8.	(United States) James Irvin	WEC	1
8.	(United States) Brian Olsen	WEC	1
8.	(United States) Jon Jones	UFC	1

- First title reign.

== See also ==
- List of current MMA Heavyweight champions
- List of UFC Heavyweight Champions
- List of Strikeforce Heavyweight Champions
- List of Pancrase Heavyweight Champions
- List of Road FC Heavyweight Champions
