= Seumanutafa =

Seumanutafa is a surname. Notable people with the surname include:

- Carl Seumanutafa, Samoan mixed martial artist
- Shoshanah Seumanutafa, Canada international rugby union player
