= Lolohea =

Lolohea is a name. Notable people with the name include:

- Lolohea Mahe (born 1982), Tongan mixed martial artist
- Filimone Lolohea (born 1979), New Zealand rugby league footballer
- Maamaloa Lolohea (1968–2020), Tongan weightlifter
- Tuimoala Lolohea (born 1995), New Zealand rugby league footballer
- Viliami Lolohea (born 1993), New Zealand rugby union player
