= Brett Rogers =

American mixed martial arts fighter

- Born: February 17, 1981 (age 45); Chicago, Illinois, United States
- Other names: Da Grim
- Height: 6 ft 5 in (1.96 m)
- Weight: 262 lb (119 kg; 18 st 10 lb)
- Division: Heavyweight
- Reach: 79 in (201 cm)
- Fighting out of: St. Paul, Minnesota, United States
- Team: American Top Team
- Years active: 2005–2015 (MMA)

Mixed martial arts record
- Total: 28
- Wins: 17
- By knockout: 15
- By decision: 2
- Losses: 10
- By knockout: 3
- By submission: 2
- By decision: 5
- No contests: 1

Other information
- Mixed martial arts record from Sherdog

Brett Charles Rogers (born February 17, 1981) is an American former mixed martial artist who most recently competed in the Heavyweight division. A professional competitor since 2005, Rogers has fought in EliteXC, Strikeforce, and Bellator.

== Background ==
Rogers was born in Chicago, Illinois and grew up in the south and west sides of the city, also living in the Cabrini Green housing project, a notoriously dangerous and gang-infested neighborhood. Rogers also grew up in this area during the crack cocaine epidemic, which made the neighborhood especially dangerous. He would often come to the aid of one of his younger brothers during street fights and, because of his imposing size, Rogers was often recruited to be in gangs, but turned down the offers. When he was twelve years old, Rogers moved to Minnesota with his grandmother.

Rogers attended Harding High School in Saint Paul, Minnesota where he played football and basketball. Rogers then went on to attend a junior college and began practicing Tae Kwon Do during this time. Before becoming a professional fighter, he had a job changing tires in a garage. Rogers had fifteen "Tough Man" bouts before going into professional mixed martial arts.

Rogers began his MMA training with Team Bison in Bloomington, MN, in the garage of head trainer Mike Reilly. Currently, Rogers trains with "Ambition MMA" in a state-of-the-art training facility formed by Reilly and his partners in 2008. Rogers continues to train on a daily basis with Reilly.

Rogers was charged in early 2011 with third degree assault on his wife and was immediately released from his Strikeforce contract.

== Mixed martial arts career ==
=== Elite XC ===
In the EliteXC: Primetime post-fight press conference, Rogers called out internet sensation Kimbo Slice, stating that Kimbo's match with James Thompson was "garbage" and that Rogers believed Kimbo tapped to a guillotine choke in the first round. Kimbo Slice then stood up, telling Rogers, "That sounds like a challenge, big dog." Rogers then barked back, "It is. In the cage." EliteXC folded later that year, and a match between the two was never consummated.

=== Strikeforce ===
In February 2009, Rogers signed with Strikeforce. On June 6, 2009, at Strikeforce: Lawler vs Shields, he defeated former UFC heavyweight champion Andrei Arlovski by TKO after 22 seconds of the opening round. This victory launched Rogers to the top of the list of heavyweights in Strikeforce and he agreed to fight MMA legend Fedor Emelianenko on CBS in Fedor vs Rogers on November 7. In the second round Fedor hit Rogers with a hard overhand right that dropped Rogers to the ground and John McCarthy quickly stopped the bout, breaking Brett's undefeated record with a KO loss.

Rogers was scheduled to face Alistair Overeem on May 15, 2010, at Strikeforce: Heavy Artillery. After a great deal of discussions on whether or not the bout would be for Overeem's Strikeforce Heavyweight Championship, it was confirmed on March 29 that the title would indeed be on the line. On May 15, 2010, Rogers lost to Overeem via TKO (strikes) at 3:40 of round one, landing only one punch in the entire fight according to CompuStrike. Rogers picked up a win against Ruben Villareal by decision in the W-1 promotion. Brett Rogers was defeated via a one arm triangle choke submission by Josh Barnett on June 18, 2011, at Strikeforce: Dallas as part of an eight-man heavyweight tournament.

=== Independent promotions ===
Rogers made his return to MMA at Titan Fighting Championships 20 against UFC veteran Eddie Sanchez. He lost the fight via split decision.

Rogers was expected to fight Dave Keeley at M-1 Global - Korea on August 17, 2013. The fight didn't happen because the event was cancelled for unknown reasons.

=== Bellator Fighting Championships ===
On June 5, 2012, it was announced that Rogers had signed a deal with Bellator Fighting Championships. He made his debut on June 22, 2012, at Bellator 71 against Kevin Asplund and won the bout by TKO after Asplund's eye closed up between rounds, prompting the referee to stop the fight.

Rogers competed in the Bellator season seven heavyweight tournament and faced Alexander Volkov in the quarter finals at Bellator 75. Volkov dominated the fight by making the most of his reach advantage. Rogers lost via unanimous decision. It was later revealed that Rogers had broken his arm during the fight, leading to his poor performance.

Rogers was scheduled to face Eric Prindle at Bellator 93 on March 21 but the fight was cancelled when Prindle pulled out.

=== Independent promotions ===
After leaving Bellator, Rogers next fought at FEFoMP: Mayor Cup 2013 against Evgeny Erokhin on October 5. He won the fight by split decision.

His next fight was at Super Fighting Enterprise where he faced Edson Ramos on November 30. He won by knockout to become the SFE Heavyweight Champion, the first championship of his career.

One month later, he fought at Inoki Bom-Ba-Ye 2013 where he faced Phil De Fries. He lost the fight by submission.

In his next bout, Rogers faced up-and-coming Russian prospect Konstantin Erokhin at Fight Nights - Battle of Moscow 15 on March 28, 2014. Rogers lost via unanimous decision.

Rogers' next appearance was at Inoki Genome Fight 1 on April 4, 2014, against Yusuke Kawaguchi. Rogers won the bout via knockout in just 28 seconds.

On May 17, 2014, Rogers faced Evgeny Erokhin in a rematch at FEFoMP- Mayor Cup 2014. Rogers was knocked out with a right hook to the chin in the later stages of round two.

The following July, Rogers faced Magomed Malikov at Fight Nights: Battle of Moscow 16. Rogers won via TKO when Malikov broke his leg while attempting a right low kick in the second round.

Rogers faced Denis Goltsov on September 19, 2014, at Tech-Krep FC: PRIME 3. He lost the fight via unanimous decision.

Rogers faced Aslambek Musaev on October 4, 2014, at ACB 10: Coliseum Time. He won via TKO in the first round.

== Personal life ==
In September 2011, Rogers pleaded guilty to domestic abuse for choking his wife and repeatedly punching her to unconsciousness in June 2011. Rogers's children could not stop him and his oldest daughter told the police that Rogers would not only beat his wife, but also beat his children. Rogers received 60 days and nights in jail, three years' probation and a $500 fine.

Rogers was arrested for sexual misconduct after allegedly groping two men in Saint Paul, Minnesota according to criminal complaints obtained from Minnesota Second Judicial District Court. On November 15, 2016, at the George Latimer Central Library, Rogers grabbed the crotch area of a library employee's pants and penis while riding the elevator. The man reportedly slapped Rogers's hand away and asked what he was doing. Rogers said nothing to the man and left the elevator as soon as the door opened. In another incident on November 22, 2016, Rogers grabbed a man's hand and pulled it toward his groin after asking the man if he wanted to go hang out or go to an apartment Rogers lived in.

On January 4, 2017, Rogers asked a man next to his urinal stall to go into another stall for a sex act to be performed on him from Rogers. After the man declined, Rogers grabbed the man's buttocks as he was still using the urinal. The man made a quick exit and later called the police and had a written statement filed.

While at the Ramsey County Jail, a former cellmate also accused Rogers of sexual assault. Rogers allegedly groped his cellmate's penis through the prison uniform pants twice while the cellmate slept. The cellmate did not call for the guards, because he feared Rogers would hurt him, describing Rogers as "the biggest and strongest dude in the jail". Rogers told jail officers that he tapped the cellmate's leg, but he did not fondle him. Rogers said that when he talks to people, he touches or taps them, referring to it as "a black thing."

== Championships and accomplishments ==
- Super Fighting Enterprise
  - SFE Heavyweight Championship (1 Time, Current)
- Other
  - Fought in the First Ever MMA Fight in Primetime on a Major American Television Network

== Mixed martial arts record ==
Professional record breakdown
28 matches	17 wins	10 losses
By knockout	15	3
By submission	0	2
By decision	2	5
No contests	1	

Res.	Record	Opponent	Method	Event	Date	Round	Time	Location	Notes
Loss	17–10 (1)	Derrick Mehmen	Decision (unanimous)	Abu Dhabi Warriors 2	March 26, 2015	3	5:00	Abu Dhabi, United Arab Emirates	
Win	17–9 (1)	Aslambek Musaev	TKO (punches)	ACB 10: Coliseum Time	October 4, 2014	1	3:25	Grozny, Russia	
Loss	16–9 (1)	Denis Goltsov	Decision (unanimous)	Tech-Krep FC: PRIME 3	September 19, 2014	3	5:00	Krasnodar, Russia	
Win	16–8 (1)	Magomed Malikov	TKO (leg injury)	Fight Nights: Battle of Moscow 16	July 11, 2014	2	1:42	Moscow, Russia	
Loss	15–8 (1)	Evgeny Erokhin	KO (punch)	FEFoMP: Mayor Cup 2014	May 17, 2014	2	3:27	Moscow, Russia	
Win	15–7 (1)	Yusuke Kawaguchi	KO (punches)	Inoki Genome Fight 1	April 4, 2014	1	0:28	Tokyo, Japan	
Loss	14–7 (1)	Konstantin Erokhin	Decision (unanimous)	Fight Nights: Battle of Moscow 15	March 28, 2014	3	5:00	Moscow, Russia	
Loss	14–6 (1)	Phil De Fries	Submission (rear-naked choke)	Inoki Bom-Ba-Ye 2013	December 31, 2013	1	3:45	Tokyo, Japan	
Win	14–5 (1)	Edson Ramos	KO (punches)	SFE II	November 30, 2013	1	0:20	Quito, Ecuador	Won SFE Heavyweight Championship.
Win	13–5 (1)	Evgeny Erokhin	Decision (split)	FEFoMP: Mayor cup 2013	October 5, 2013	3	5:00	Yuzhno-Sakhalinsk, Russia	
Loss	12–5 (1)	Alexander Volkov	Decision (unanimous)	Bellator 75	October 5, 2012	3	5:00	Hammond, Indiana, United States	Bellator Season Seven Heavyweight Tournament Quarterfinal.
Win	12–4 (1)	Kevin Asplund	TKO (doctor stoppage)	Bellator 71	June 22, 2012	2	5:00	Chester, West Virginia, United States	
NC	11–4 (1)	Todd Allee	NC (illegal blow to back of head)	IFL 45: My Bloody Valentine	February 18, 2012	1	1:18	Auburn Hills, Michigan, United States	
Loss	11–4	Eddie Sanchez	Decision (split)	Titan Fighting Championships 20	September 23, 2011	3	5:00	Kansas City, Kansas, United States	
Loss	11–3	Josh Barnett	Submission (arm-triangle choke)	Strikeforce: Overeem vs. Werdum	June 18, 2011	2	1:17	Dallas, Texas, United States	Strikeforce 2011 Heavyweight Tournament Quarterfinal.
Win	11–2	Ruben Villareal	Decision (unanimous)	W-1 MMA 6: New Ground	October 23, 2010	3	5:00	Halifax, Nova Scotia, Canada	
Loss	10–2	Alistair Overeem	TKO (punches)	Strikeforce: Heavy Artillery	May 15, 2010	1	3:40	St. Louis, Missouri, United States	For Strikeforce Heavyweight Championship.
Loss	10–1	Fedor Emelianenko	KO (punches)	Strikeforce: Fedor vs. Rogers	November 7, 2009	2	1:48	Hoffman Estates, Illinois, United States	
Win	10–0	Andrei Arlovski	TKO (punches)	Strikeforce: Lawler vs. Shields	June 6, 2009	1	0:22	St. Louis, Missouri, United States	
Win	9–0	Abongo Humphrey	TKO (knees)	Strikeforce: Shamrock vs. Diaz	April 11, 2009	1	1:38	San Jose, California, United States	
Win	8–0	Jon Murphy	KO (punch)	EliteXC: Primetime	May 31, 2008	1	1:01	Newark, New Jersey, United States	
Win	7–0	James Thompson	KO (punches)	EliteXC: Street Certified	February 16, 2008	1	2:24	Sunrise, Florida, United States	
Win	6–0	Ralph Kelly	TKO (submission to punches)	EliteXC: Renegade	November 10, 2007	1	1:43	Corpus Christi, Texas, United States	
Win	5–0	Josh Melichar	KO (punches)	EFX: Fury	February 1, 2007	1	0:12	Minneapolis, Minnesota, United States	
Win	4–0	Mark Racine	TKO (punches)	EFX: Fury	December 17, 2006	1	2:35	Minnesota, United States	
Win	3–0	Brian Heden	KO (punches)	EFX: Fury	November 1, 2006	1	1:20	Minneapolis, Minnesota, United States	
Win	2–0	Chris Clark	TKO (punches)	EFX: Fury	May 3, 2006	1	0:37	Minnesota, United States	
Win	1–0	Stan Strong	KO (punches)	UCS: Throwdown at the T-Bar	July 30, 2005	1	0:13	Ellsworth, Minnesota, United States	

== See also ==
- List of Bellator MMA alumni
