= Ginty Vrede =

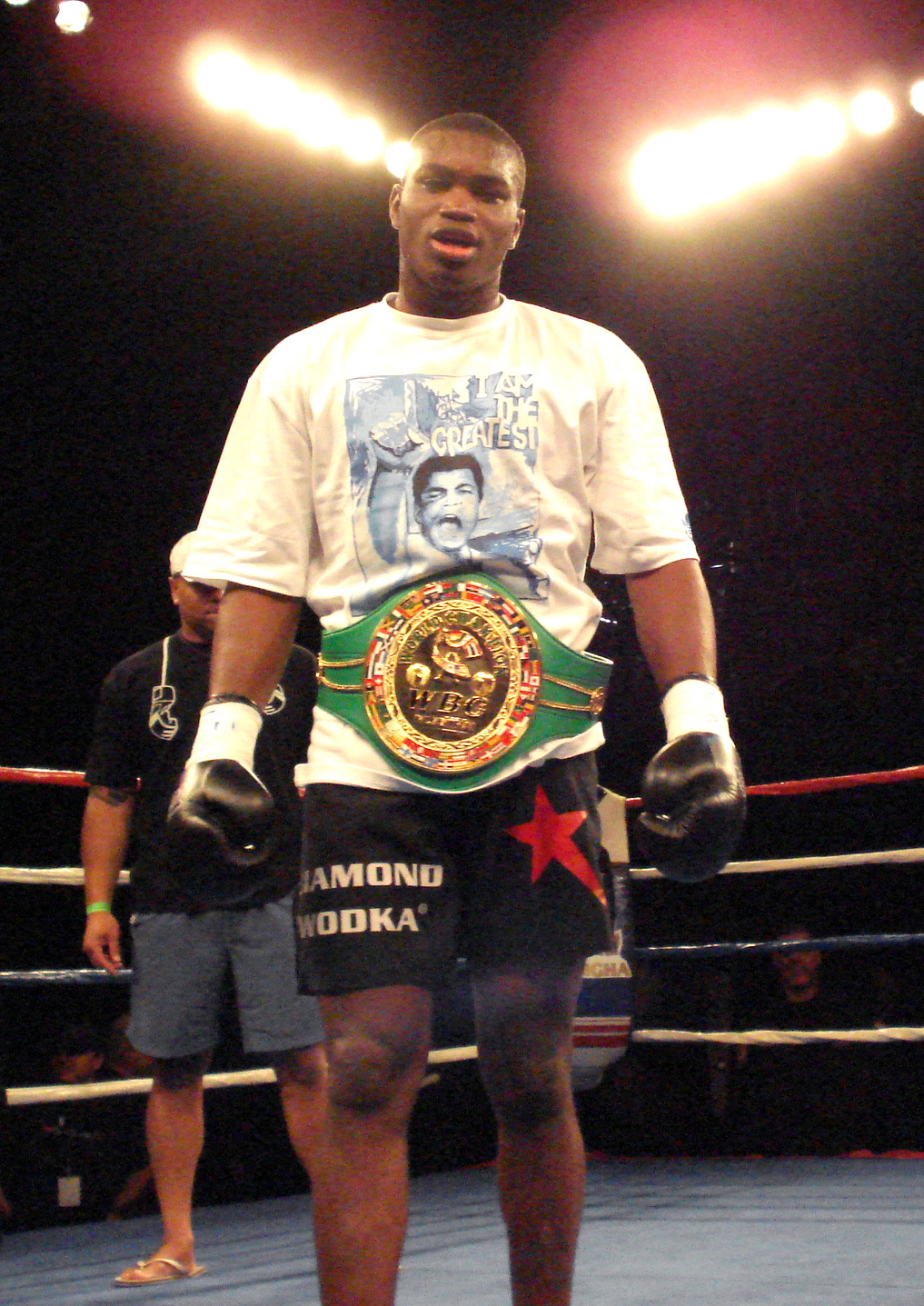
- Born: Ginty Owen Vrede; July 18, 1985; Paramaribo, Suriname
- Died: January 28, 2008 (aged 22); Amsterdam, Netherlands
- Height: 1.88 m (6 ft 2 in)
- Weight: 95 kg (209 lb; 15.0 st)
- Division: Heavyweight
- Style: Muay Thai
- Fighting out of: Heiloo, Netherlands
- Team: Bear Paw Gym
- Trainer: Harry Berepoot
- Years active: 2004–2008

Kickboxing record
- Total: 23
- Wins: 21
- By knockout: 19
- Losses: 1
- No contests: 1

Ginty Vrede (July 18, 1985 – January 28, 2008) was a Dutch kickboxer and 2008 WBC Muaythai Heavyweight World champion.

== Biography and career ==
Vrede won the WBC Muaythai heavyweight World title by beating the previously unbeaten Shane del Rosario in Las Vegas on January 12, 2008, by KO in the first round. Two weeks later, despite being medically tested before his fight in Las Vegas, Vrede died aged 22 from cardiac arrest during a training session in Amsterdam. He was trained by Harry Berepoot who has produced several other World champion fighters in both Muay Thai and Mixed Martial Arts.

Vrede made a habit of knocking out all comers and boasted a high rate, which led to him being compared with K-1 superstar Remy Bonjasky. He was known for his lightning low kicks which he delivered with power, timing and precision. He also had a reputation for hard righthand pin-point punches and powerful knee strikes.

Ginty was on an impromptu training session in the Pancration Sports Centre in Amsterdam when at some point he stated that he did not feel very well, and collapsed moments later. CPR administered for nearly half an hour could not save him. He died on his way to the hospital.

== Titles ==
- 2008 WBC Muaythai Heavyweight World champion.

== Kickboxing record ==
21 Wins (19 (T)KO's, 2 decisions), 1 Loss 1 NC
Date	Result	Opponent	Event	Method	Round	Time
01/12/2008	Win	(United States) Shane Del Rosario	Muay Thai Championships, Las Vegas, NV	KO (Left hook)	1	2:14
Wins WBC Muaythai world heavyweight (95.455 - 104.545 kg.) title.
12/24/2007	Win	(Serbia) Slavo Polugic	Return of the King 2, Paramaribo, Suriname	KO	2	
12/02/2007	Win	(Netherlands) Brian Douwes	Time for Action, Nijmegen, Netherlands	TKO (Low kicks)	2	
10/21/2007	Loss	(Curaçao) Wendell Roche	Gala Top Team, Beverwijk, Netherlands	Decision	5	3:00
07/01/2007	Win	(Morocco) Mounier Zekhnini	Next Generation Warriors, Netherlands	KO (Left hook)	1	
05/06/2007	Win	(Curaçao) Sharlimar Zimmerman	Slamm 3 Nederland vs Thailand, Haarlem, Netherlands	TKO (Right low kicks)	2	
03/12/2007	Win	(Netherlands) Hesdy Gerges	Rings "The Chosen Ones", Utrecht, Netherlands	TKO (Referee stoppage)	1	
11/25/2006	Win	(Netherlands) Rick van Soest	Gala in Zilvermeeuwen, Netherlands	KO (Right punch)	5	
11/19/2006	Win	(Netherlands) Roy Dijkshoorn	Blood, Sweat & Tears, Enchede, Netherlands	KO	1	
10/15/2006	Win	(Netherlands) Bart Steltenpool]	Gala in Beverwijk, Netherlands	TKO	2	
03/26/2006	Win	(Netherlands) Roberto Flamingo	K-1 MAX Netherlands 2006, Utrecht, Netherlands	TKO (Referee stoppage)	4	2:00
02/12/2006	Win	(Palestine) Mo Boubkari	Muay Thai Gala in Amsterdam, Netherlands	KO	2	
10/30/2005	Win	(Netherlands) Patrick Niezemuller	Gala in Alkmaar, Netherlands	TKO (Referee Stoppage)	1	
09/17/2005	Win	(Turkey) Yusuf Uzel	Gala in Zilvermeeuwen, Netherlands	KO (Right high kick)	2	
04/23/2005	Win	(Netherlands) Jaap Muys	Muay Thai Gala in Spakenburg, Netherlands	Decision	3	2:00
03/19/2005	Win	(Netherlands) Willem Boersma	Muay Thai Gala in Hougwoud, Netherlands	KO	1	
02/20/2005	Win	(Netherlands) Maikel Kaptein	It's Showtime, Zonnehuis, Netherlands	Decision	3	3:00
02/05/2005	NC	(Turkey) Engin Kaya	Gala in Zilwermeeuwen, Netherlands	No contest		
10/17/2004	Win	(Morocco) Mohammed Nooij	Muay Thai Gala in Hilversum, Netherlands	TKO		

== See also ==
- List of male kickboxers
