= Brandon Cash =

American mixed martial artist

- Born: April 29, 1980 (age 46); Fresno, California, United States
- Other names: Money
- Height: 6 ft 5 in (1.96 m)
- Weight: 256 lb (116 kg; 18.3 st)
- Division: Super Heavyweight; Heavyweight
- Reach: 74 in (190 cm)
- Stance: Orthodox
- Fighting out of: Fresno, California, United States
- Team: Thrive and Dethrone
- Years active: 2008-present

Mixed martial arts record
- Total: 16
- Wins: 10
- By knockout: 7
- By submission: 2
- By decision: 1
- Losses: 6
- By knockout: 3
- By submission: 3

Brandon Cash (born April 29, 1980) is an American mixed martial artist currently competing in the Heavyweight division. A professional competitor since 2008, he has formerly competed for Strikeforce, Bellator, the World Series of Fighting, and Palace Fighting Championship.

== Background ==
Cash is from Fresno, California and was troubled growing up, but competed in various sports as an outlet. Cash began wrestling in the third grade and then continued through high school and college. After finishing his collegiate wrestling career, Cash began to pursue a career in mixed martial arts, moving to Huntington Beach, California.

== Mixed martial arts career ==
=== Early career ===
Cash made his professional debut in 2008 and won his first four fights before being signed by Strikeforce.

=== Strikeforce ===
Cash made his debut for the promotion on November 6, 2009, against fellow unbeaten prospect Shane del Rosario. Cash was handed his first professional loss via omoplata submission in the first round.

After dropping another loss for an independent promotion, Cash returned to Strikeforce a year after his debut loss against John Devine on October 22, 2010, and lost via rear-naked choke submission in the first round.

=== Bellator ===
Cash held a 2-0 record after Strikeforce and was signed by Bellator. He made his debut for the organization on October 4, 2013, at Bellator 102 and won via TKO after his opponent did not come out for the second round.

== Personal life ==
Aside from being a professional fighter, Cash works as a tattoo artist.

== Mixed martial arts record ==
Professional record breakdown
| 16 matches | 10 wins | 6 losses |
| By knockout | 7 | 3 |
| By submission | 2 | 3 |
| By decision | 1 | 0 |

| Res. | Record | Opponent | Method | Event | Date | Round | Time | Location | Notes |
|---|---|---|---|---|---|---|---|---|---|
| Loss | 10–6 | Jordan Powell | TKO (punches) | Road to ONE: RUF 40 | April 25, 2021 | 3 | 1:44 | Glendale, Arizona, United States | |
| Loss | 10–5 | Evgeniy Goncharov | TKO (punches) | WCFA 48: Zhamaldaev vs. Khasbulaev 2 | May 4, 2018 | 1 | 2:17 | Baku, Azerbaijan | |
| Loss | 10–4 | Evgeny Erokhin | TKO (knee injury) | WSOF Global Championship 2 | February 7, 2016 | 1 | 1:47 | Tokyo, Japan | For the WSOF Global Heavyweight Championship. |
| Win | 10–3 | Dimitriy Mikutsa | TKO (punches) | Kunlun Fight 29: Battle in Sochi 2015 | August 15, 2015 | 3 | 3:56 | Sochi, Russia | |
| Win | 9–3 | Eric Prindle | TKO (submission to punches) | The Warriors Cage 22 | June 26, 2015 | 1 | 2:18 | Porterville, California, United States | Super Heavyweight bout. |
| Win | 8–3 | William Richey | TKO (retirement) | Bellator 102 | October 4, 2013 | 2 | 5:00 | Visalia, California, United States | |
| Win | 7–3 | Matt Anderson | TKO (punches) | Gladiator Challenge: Super Fight Night | February 1, 2013 | 1 | 0:17 | Lincoln, California, United States | |
| Win | 6–3 | Javy Ayala | KO (punch) | JW Events: Up and Comers 12: Turning Point | September 22, 2012 | 1 | 0:31 | California, United States | |
| Loss | 5–3 | John Devine | Submission (rear-naked choke) | Strikeforce Challengers: Bowling vs. Voelker | September 22, 2010 | 1 | 3:05 | Fresno, California, United States | |
| Loss | 5–2 | Jim Yorke | TKO (submission to punches) | CFC: Cage Fighting Championships 14 | June 5, 2010 | 1 | 4:33 | Sydney, Australia | |
| Loss | 5–1 | Shane del Rosario | Submission (omoplata) | Strikeforce Challengers: Gurgel vs. Evangelista | November 6, 2009 | 1 | 2:57 | Fresno, California, United States | |
| Win | 5–0 | Steve Gavin | TKO (punches) | PFC: Best of Both Worlds | February 6, 2009 | 1 | 0:26 | Lemoore, California, United States | |
| Win | 4–0 | Liron Wilson | Decision (unanimous) | War Gods: Do or Die | November 8, 2008 | 3 | 5:00 | Fresno, California, United States | |
| Win | 3–0 | Frederick Steen | TKO (punches) | WG: War Gods | September 12, 2008 | 1 | 1:47 | Salinas, California, United States | |
| Win | 2–0 | Ian Mort | TKO (punches) | WG: War Gods | July 26, 2008 | 1 | 0:37 | Fresno, California, United States | |
| Win | 1–0 | Anthony Vonrekowski | Submission (arm-triangle choke) | PureCombat 3: Bring the Pain | May 9, 2008 | 2 | 0:55 | Stockton, California, United States | |
