= WEC 24 =

WEC MMA events in 2006

WEC 24: Full Force
- Promotion: World Extreme Cagefighting
- Date: October 12, 2006
- Venue: Tachi Palace Hotel & Casino
- City: Lemoore, California

Event chronology
WEC 23: Hot August Fights	WEC 24: Full Force	WEC 25: McCullough vs. Cope

WEC 24: Full Force was a mixed martial arts event held on October 12, 2006. WEC 24's main event was a championship fight for the WEC Lightweight Title between champion Hermes Franca and challenger Nate Diaz.

== Results ==
Main Card
Weight class				Method	Round	Time	Notes
Lightweight	Hermes Franca (c)	def.	Nate Diaz	Submission (Armbar)	2	2:46	(Note: For the WEC Lightweight Championship.)
Light Heavyweight	Terry Martin	def.	Keith Berry	TKO (Punches)	1	2:52
Lightweight	John Polakowski	def.	Olaf Alfonso	Decision (Split)	3	5:00
Heavyweight	Justin Eilers	def.	Josh Diekmann	TKO (Punches)	1	2:29
Lightweight	Poppies Martinez	def.	Robert Breslin	Submission (Guillotine Choke)	1	0:52
Light Heavyweight	Glover Teixeira	def.	Rameau Thierry Sokoudjou	KO (Punches)	1	1:41
Light Heavyweight	Justin Levens	def.	Justin Hawes	KO (Punches and Elbows)	1	1:28
Welterweight	Dave Terrel	def.	Mike Moreno	Decision (Unanimous)	3	5:00
Middleweight	Patrick Kaase	def.	Jarrod Kwitty	TKO (Punches)	2	2:30

== Miscelleaneous ==
This was the WEC's last event before being purchased by Zuffa, LLC, the parent company of the Ultimate Fighting Championship. It was also the last WEC card to feature matches in the heavyweight division, which was shut down (along with the super-heavyweight division) after Zuffa purchased the company.

== See also ==
- World Extreme Cagefighting
- List of World Extreme Cagefighting champions
- List of WEC events
- 2006 in WEC
