= Shane del Rosario =

American kickboxer and mixed martial arts fighter

- Born: Shane Kalani del Rosario; September 23, 1983; Hacienda Heights, California, United States
- Died: December 9, 2013 (aged 30); Newport Beach, California, United States
- Nickname: No Limits
- Nationality: American
- Height: 6 ft 3 in (191 cm)
- Weight: 246 lb (112 kg; 17 st 8 lb)
- Division: Heavyweight
- Reach: 78 in (198 cm)
- Style: Kickboxing, BJJ
- Fighting out of: Irvine, California
- Team: Team Oyama; Team DeathClutch
- Rank: Blue belt in Brazilian Jiu-Jitsu
- Years active: 2006–2013 (MMA); 2006–2008 (Kickboxing)

Kickboxing record
- Total: 9
- Wins: 8
- By knockout: 8
- Losses: 1
- By knockout: 1

Mixed martial arts record
- Total: 13
- Wins: 11
- By knockout: 8
- By submission: 3
- Losses: 2
- By knockout: 2

Amateur Muay Thai record
- Total: 3
- Wins: 3

Other information
- Notable school: University of California, Irvine
- Mixed martial arts record from Sherdog

Shane Kalani del Rosario (September 23, 1983 – December 9, 2013) was an American professional mixed martial artist and kickboxer. He competed in the Ultimate Fighting Championship's Heavyweight division, Strikeforce, M-1 Global, ShoXC, and King of the Cage. He held the distinction of being the first American to become the WBC Muay Thai World Heavyweight Champion.

== Early life ==
Del Rosario was born and raised in Orange County, California, and was half-Filipino American. He started training as a fighter at the age of 17 with Marco Ruas. Del Rosario then attended and graduated from college with a bachelor's degree in psychology out of UC Irvine.

== Kickboxing career ==
Del Rosario competed as a Heavyweight in Muay Thai on the World Championship Kickboxing series of kickboxing events and In Sync Productions Inc.

On November 9, 2006, Shane Del Rosario fought Tyler Grear. After surviving a spinning backfist that stunned him in round one, Del Rosario dropped Grear with a power punch early in round two. Grear could not beat the referee's 10-count as Del Rosario was declared the winner by knockout at 16 seconds of the second round.

After defeating Justin Carver by first-round knockout on January 11, 2007, Shane then fought reigning WBC Muay Thai International Heavyweight Champion Ricardo van den Bos for the vacant WBC Muay Thai World Heavyweight Championship. Del Rosario dominated van den Bos throughout the majority of the bout. After dropping van den Bos twice in round number two, Del Rosario landed a knee that finished Ricardo van den Bos at the last second of the round. He was then declared the winner by knockout at 3:00 of round two and the new WBC Muay Thai World Heavyweight Champion. He would also become the first American to have won the WBC Muay Thai World Heavyweight title.

Del Rosario's first career loss came in his first title defense against Dutch kickboxer Ginty Vrede. Going into the bout as the fan favorite, he appeared to hurt Vrede in the opening round. Vrede came back with a powerful hook that stunned del Rosario and forced a standing eight-count by referee Steve Mazzagatti. After beating the count, del Rosario was dropped by an immediate high kick. The referee stopped the fight at 2:24 of the first round and declared Vrede the new WBC Muay Thai World Heavyweight Champion.

Following Vrede's death, the WBC World Heavyweight Championship was vacated. Del Rosario then knocked out Mexican kickboxer Ricardo Romero at 1:20 in the second round on July 26, 2008, to win the title for a second time.

== Mixed martial arts career ==
Shane del Rosario transitioned into mixed martial arts in 2006 when he made his debut for mixed martial arts promotion King of the Cage. He then competed for notable promotions including EliteXC, M-1 Global and Strikeforce.

=== Strikeforce ===
Shane del Rosario defeated Brandon Cash in his Strikeforce debut. He was expected to face Bobby Lashley at Strikeforce: Miami, but the bout never materialized. He was then expected to meet Ron Sparks at Strikeforce: Los Angeles on June 16, but that bout also never happened. Shane won against Lolohea Mahe by way of TKO on July 23, 2010, at Strikeforce Challengers: del Rosario vs. Mahe. After the bout, Shane expressed his desire to fight former UFC heavyweight champion Andrei Arlovski.

On February 12, 2011, Del Rosario competed in an alternate bout for Strikeforce's World Grand Prix Heavyweight Tournament. He faced Lavar Johnson and won the bout with an armbar submission in the closing minute of the first round to earn the first reserve spot in the tournament.

He was to face Daniel Cormier at Strikeforce: Overeem vs. Werdum, but was involved in a car accident in which a drunk woman hit his car from the back. As a result, from the accident, he suffered a herniated disc which kept him from training as well as forcing him to withdraw from the bout.

=== Ultimate Fighting Championship ===
Del Rosario's manager Jason House announced that he had signed to the UFC to compete in the Heavyweight division, starting in 2012.

Del Rosario was expected to face Gabriel Gonzaga on May 26, 2012, at UFC 146. Due to Alistair Overeem testing positive for high levels of testosterone, Frank Mir replaced him for the title shot which promoted Antônio Silva to fight for the co-main event against Cain Velasquez. The move left Roy Nelson with no opponent, which prompted the UFC to let him face former title contender Gonzaga while del Rosario faced Stipe Miocic. del Rosario was defeated in the second round by TKO, giving him his first professional MMA career loss.

Del Rosario faced Pat Barry at The Ultimate Fighter: Team Carwin vs. Team Nelson Finale. He lost the fight by knockout at 0:26 of the second round. Afterwards, Del Rosario was expected to face Dave Herman on July 6, 2013, at UFC 162, but was forced to withdraw from the bout due to an injury and was replaced by Gabriel Gonzaga.

Del Rosario was expected to face Guto Inocente on December 28, 2013, at UFC 168. Del Rosario pulled out of the bout in October citing a rib injury.

== Cardiac arrest and death ==
On November 26, 2013, del Rosario was hospitalized at Hoag Memorial Hospital Presbyterian in Newport Beach, California, after suffering full cardiac arrest following two heart attacks. According to Del Rosario's manager, Jason House, in a statement to Sherdog.com, del Rosario suffered a catastrophic cardiovascular collapse at home and was rushed to the hospital, where he was resuscitated in the emergency room back to a stable heart rhythm and blood pressure. According to Erik Apple, a training partner who had known del Rosario since they were in high school, del Rosario's liver and kidneys were not functioning and he had been put on dialysis.

ESPN reported del Rosario had died on November 28, and this was repeated in various outlets. The credited author denied having written the story, and later reported del Rosario alive, though without brain activity. On November 30, del Rosario was taken off life support and breathing on his own. He also registered brain activity and squeezed his mother's hand. Despite the improvements in his condition, del Rosario died on December 9, 2013.

A drug toxicology screen performed at the time of del Rosario's death indicated that he had recently used cocaine and opiates. However, the immediate causes of death listed on his death certificate are anoxic encephalopathy, ventricular fibrillation and Long QT Syndrome, and additionally that "other significant conditions contributing to death but not resulting in the underlying cause" were cocaine and opiates.

== Championships and accomplishments ==
=== Mixed martial arts ===
- Strikeforce
  - Strikeforce Heavyweight Grand Prix Tournament Reserve

=== Kickboxing ===
- World Boxing Council Muaythai
  - 2008 World Boxing Council Muaythai World Heavyweight Championship
  - 2007 World Boxing Council Muaythai World Heavyweight Championship

== Mixed martial arts record ==
Professional record breakdown
13 matches	11 wins	2 losses
By knockout	8	2
By submission	3	0

Res.	Record	Opponent	Method	Event	Date	Round	Time	Location	Notes
Loss	11–2	Pat Barry	KO (punches)	The Ultimate Fighter: Team Carwin vs. Team Nelson Finale	December 15, 2012	2	0:26	Las Vegas, Nevada, United States	
Loss	11–1	Stipe Miocic	TKO (elbows)	UFC 146	May 26, 2012	2	3:14	Las Vegas, Nevada, United States	
Win	11–0	Lavar Johnson	Submission (armbar)	Strikeforce: Fedor vs. Silva	February 12, 2011	1	4:31	East Rutherford, New Jersey, United States	Strikeforce Heavyweight Grand Prix Reserve Bout.
Win	10–0	Lolohea Mahe	TKO (knees and punches)	Strikeforce Challengers: del Rosario vs. Mahe	July 23, 2010	1	3:48	Everett, Washington, United States	
Win	9–0	Brandon Cash	Submission (omoplata)	Strikeforce Challengers: Gurgel vs. Evangelista	November 6, 2009	1	2:57	Fresno, California, United States	
Win	8–0	Lloyd Marshbanks	TKO (knees)	M-1 Challenge 19: 2009 Semifinals	September 26, 2009	1	1:34	Rostov-on-Don, Russia	
Win	7–0	Maxim Grishin	TKO (punches)	M-1 Challenge 17: Korea	July 4, 2009	1	0:21	Seoul, South Korea	
Win	6–0	Dool Hee-Lee	TKO (body punch)	M-1 Challenge 14: Japan	April 29, 2009	1	2:27	Tokyo, Japan	
Win	5–0	Carl Seumanutafa	TKO (punches)	ShoXC: Elite Challenger Series	September 26, 2008	2	1:07	Santa Ynez, California, United States	
Win	4–0	Analu Brash	TKO (punches)	ShoXC: Elite Challenger Series	March 21, 2008	1	3:18	Santa Ynez, California, United States	
Win	3–0	Amedeo Viola	Submission (triangle choke)	ShoXC: Elite Challenger Series	October 26, 2007	1	2:27	Santa Ynez, California, United States	
Win	2–0	Gilbert Carreto	TKO (punches)	No Limits: Proving Grounds	April 21, 2007	1	1:19	Irvine, California, United States	
Win	1–0	Gábor Németh	TKO (punches)	KOTC: Rapid Fire	August 4, 2006	1	3:53	San Jacinto, California, United States	

== Kickboxing record (incomplete) ==
Kickboxing record
8 wins (8 (T)KOs), 1 loss

Result	Opponent	Method	Event	Date	Round	Time	Location
Win	(Mexico) Raul Romero	KO	World Championship Kickboxing: Full Rules Muay Thai	July 26, 2008	2	1:20	(United States) Las Vegas, Nevada
Won vacant WBC Muay Thai World Heavyweight Championship.
Loss	(Suriname) Ginty Vrede	TKO	World Championship Kickboxing: Full Rules Muay Thai	January 12, 2008	1	2:24	(United States) Las Vegas, Nevada
Lost WBC Muay Thai World Heavyweight Championship.
Win	(Netherlands) Ricardo van den Bos	KO	World Championship Kickboxing: Full Rules Muay Thai	September 8, 2007	2	3:00	(United States) Gardena, California
Won vacant WBC Muay Thai World Heavyweight Championship.
Win	(United States) Justin Carver	KO	World Championship Kickboxing: Full Rules Muay Thai	January 11, 2007	1	1:58	(United States) Highland, California
Win	(United States) Tyler Grear	KO	World Championship Kickboxing: Full Rules Muay Thai	November 9, 2006	2	0:16	(United States) Highland, California

Legend: Win

Loss Draw/no contest Notes

== See also ==
- List of current UFC fighters
