= Kevin Jordan (fighter) =

American MMA fighter (born 1970)

- Born: December 31, 1970 (age 55); Fairfield, California, United States
- Other names: The Shaman
- Height: 6 ft 3 in (1.91 m)
- Weight: 236.6 lb (107.3 kg; 16.90 st)
- Division: Super Heavyweight; Heavyweight
- Stance: Orthodox
- Fighting out of: Columbus, Georgia, United States
- Team: USCAA
- Years active: 2000-2010

Mixed martial arts record
- Total: 20
- Wins: 11
- By knockout: 3
- By submission: 4
- By decision: 4
- Losses: 9
- By knockout: 4
- By submission: 2
- By decision: 3

Other information
- Mixed martial arts record from Sherdog

Kevin Jordan (born December 31, 1970) is a retired American mixed martial artist. A professional competitor from 2000 until 2010, he competed for the UFC and Strikeforce.

== Mixed martial arts record ==
Professional record breakdown
20 matches	11 wins	9 losses
By knockout	3	4
By submission	4	2
By decision	4	3

Res.	Record	Opponent	Method	Event	Date	Round	Time	Location	Notes
Loss	11–9	Branden Lee Hinkle	TKO (punches)	DFL 1: The Big Bang	November 24, 2010	1	2:30	Atlantic City, New Jersey, United States	
Loss	11–8	Ray Sefo	TKO (knee injury)	Strikeforce Challengers: Kennedy vs. Cummings	September 25, 2009	2	0:24	Bixby, Oklahoma, United States	
Win	11–7	Patrick Smith	Decision (unanimous)	American Steel Cagefighting	August 1, 2009	3	5:00	Salem, New Hampshire, United States	
Loss	10–7	Joel Wyatt	Decision (split)	RIE: Battle at the Burg 1	March 21, 2009	3	5:00	Harrisonburg, Virginia, United States	Return to Heavyweight.
Loss	10–6	Marcos Santa Cruz	Decision (unanimous)	FFP: Untamed 22	August 23, 2008	3	5:00	Plymouth, Massachusetts, United States	Super Heavyweight debut.
Win	10–5	Carlos Moreno	Submission (kneebar)	BCX 3: Battle Cage Xtreme 3	October 20, 2007	3	2:04	Atlantic City, New Jersey, United States	
Win	9–5	Chris Herring	TKO (submission to punches)	Wild Bill's: Fight Night 6	January 19, 2007	1	1:19	Duluth, Georgia, United States	
Loss	8–5	Josh Diekmann	TKO (injury)	FFP: Untamed 3	March 4, 2006	1	0:10	Brockton, Massachusetts, United States	
Loss	8–4	Gabriel Gonzaga	KO (superman punch)	UFC 56	November 19, 2005	3	4:39	Las Vegas, Nevada, United States	
Loss	8–3	Paul Buentello	Submission (guillotine choke)	UFC 53	June 4, 2005	1	4:00	Atlantic City, New Jersey, United States	
Win	8–2	John Dixson	Decision (unanimous)	FFC 13: Freestyle Fighting Championships 13	December 10, 2004	3	5:00	Biloxi, Mississippi, United States	
Win	7–2	Eric Loveless	Decision	FFC 11: Explosion	September 10, 2004	N/A		Biloxi, Mississippi, United States	
Win	6–2	Kerry Schall	Submission (rear-naked choke)	XFO 2: New Blood	June 26, 2004	1	2:06	Fontana, Wisconsin, United States	
Win	5–2	Chris Seifert	TKO (punches)	FFC 8: Freestyle Fighting Championships 8	March 5, 2004	2	0:55	Biloxi, Mississippi, United States	
Win	4–2	Jayme Mckinney	Submission (armbar)	XFC 1: Xtreme Fight Club 1	November 14, 2003	1		Morgan City, Louisiana, United States	
Win	3–2	Sam Holloway	TKO	ICB: International Cage Brawl	August 16, 2003	1		Birmingham, Alabama, United States	
Win	2–2	Sean Sallee	Decision (majority)	Tennessee Shooto: Conquest	January 17, 2003	2	5:00	Clarksville, Tennessee, United States	
Loss	1–2	Travis Wiuff	Decision (unanimous)	UW: Ultimate Wrestling	June 29, 2002	3		Minneapolis, Minnesota, United States	
Loss	1–1	Wesley Correira	TKO (punches)	SB 24: Return of the Heavyweights 1	April 26, 2002	1	4:28	Honolulu, United States	
Win	1–0	Kelly Williams	TKO	BB 9: Fights, Bikes, & Babes	July 27, 2000	1	0:00	Gainesville, Georgia, United States	
