= Javy Ayala =

American mixed martial artist

- Born: August 22, 1988 (age 38); Porterville, California, United States
- Other names: Eye Candy
- Height: 6 ft 2 in (188 cm)
- Weight: 265 lb (120 kg; 18 st 13 lb)
- Division: Heavyweight
- Reach: 76 in (193 cm)
- Team: Fearless Fighters Gym
- Years active: 2011–2020

Mixed martial arts record
- Total: 19
- Wins: 11
- By knockout: 7
- By submission: 3
- By decision: 1
- Losses: 8
- By knockout: 4
- By submission: 1
- By decision: 3

Other information
- Mixed martial arts record from Sherdog

Javier "Javy" Ayala (born August 22, 1988) is an American former mixed martial artist who competed in the Heavyweight division. A professional competitor since 2011, he has competed for Bellator and Tachi Palace Fights.

== Background ==
Born and raised in Porterville, California, Ayala began wrestling in the seventh grade. Ayala continued with the sport at Porterville High School, where he also competed in track and field. running the 100-meter dash, as well as throwing the discus and shot put. Ayala began his MMA career around 12 years old.

== Mixed martial arts career ==
=== Early career ===
Ayala made his professional mixed martial arts debut in 2011 and compiled a record of 5–3, while competing on the regional circuit in California for promotions such as Tachi Palace Fights.

=== Bellator MMA ===
Ayala signed a three-fight contract with Bellator and made his promotional debut at Bellator 102 in Visalia, California on October 4, 2013, against Thiago dos Santos. Ayala won in an upset, knocking out the Brazilian fighter with a series of punches as the first round ended, causing referee John McCarthy to call off the fight.

After the fight, Ayala's contract was updated to six fights and he faced off against Eric Prindle at Bellator 111 on March 7, 2014. Ayala won via TKO due to a doctor stoppage in the third round, after dominating the first two rounds.

Ayala faced undefeated Raphael Butler on September 19, 2014, at Bellator 125. He won the fight via submission in the first round.

Ayala faced Alex Huddleston at Bellator 139 on June 26, 2015. He lost the fight via submission in the first round.

Ayala faced Carl Seumanutafa at Bellator 148 on January 29, 2016. He lost the fight via TKO in the second round.

Ayala returned to face Roy Boughton at Bellator 156 on June 17, 2016. He won the fight via TKO in the first round.

In his highest profile bout to date, Ayala faced Sergei Kharitonov at Bellator 163 on November 4, 2016. Despite being a significant underdog, Ayala won the fight via knockout just sixteen seconds into the first round.

Ayala faced debuting heavyweight Roy Nelson at Bellator 183 on September 23, 2017. He lost the fight by unanimous decision.

Ayala faced Cheick Kongo at Bellator 199 on May 12 in San Jose, CA. He lost the fight via knockout in the first round.

In his highest profile match to date, Ayala faced former UFC Heavyweight champion Frank Mir at Bellator 212 on December 14, 2018. After being taken down and controlled on the ground in the first round, Ayala rallied in the second round to win via TKO after Mir tapped to punches.

Ayala was to face former Bellator Heavyweight champion Vitaly Minakov at Bellator 225 on August 24, 2019. However, on the day of the fight, it was announced that Ayala was pulled from the fight by the Connecticut Boxing Commission due to an undisclosed medical reason and was replaced by Tim Johnson.

Ayala was rescheduled to meet Minakov at Bellator 232 on October 26, 2019. However, Minakov was unable to obtain visa for the bout, leading to Ayala being pulled from the card also.

Ayala faced Valentin Moldavsky at Bellator 239 on February 21, 2020. After being taken down and dominated on the ground, he lost the fight by unanimous decision.

== Personal life ==
Ayala is married and has two children. He is the cousin of former UFC Bantamweight fighter Joe Soto.

== Championships and accomplishments ==
- Bellator MMA
  - Tied (with Tyrell Fortune) for most stoppage wins in Bellator heavyweight division history (six)

== Mixed martial arts record ==
Professional record breakdown
19 matches	11 wins	8 losses
By knockout	7	4
By submission	3	1
By decision	1	3

Res.	Record	Opponent	Method	Event	Date	Round	Time	Location	Notes
Loss	11–8	Valentin Moldavsky	Decision (unanimous)	Bellator 239	February 21, 2020	3	5:00	Thackerville, Oklahoma, United States	
Win	11–7	Frank Mir	TKO (submission to punches)	Bellator 212	December 14, 2018	2	4:30	Honolulu, Hawaii, United States	
Loss	10–7	Cheick Kongo	KO (punches)	Bellator 199	May 12, 2018	1	2:29	San Jose, California, United States	
Loss	10–6	Roy Nelson	Decision (unanimous)	Bellator 183	September 24, 2017	3	5:00	San Jose, California, United States	
Win	10–5	Sergei Kharitonov	KO (punch)	Bellator 163	November 4, 2016	1	0:16	Uncasville, Connecticut, United States	
Win	9–5	Roy Boughton	TKO (punches)	Bellator 156	June 17, 2016	1	3:02	Fresno, California, United States	
Loss	8–5	Carl Seumanutafa	TKO (punches)	Bellator 148	January 29, 2016	2	3:46	Fresno, California, United States	
Loss	8–4	Alex Huddleston	Submission (rear-naked choke)	Bellator 139	June 26, 2015	1	1:12	Mulvane, Kansas, United States	
Win	8–3	Raphael Butler	Submission (rear-naked choke)	Bellator 125	September 19, 2014	1	1:03	Fresno, California, United States	
Win	7–3	Eric Prindle	TKO (doctor stoppage)	Bellator 111	March 7, 2014	3	3:05	Thackerville, Oklahoma, United States	
Win	6–3	Thiago dos Santos	KO (punches)	Bellator 102	October 4, 2013	1	5:00	Visalia, California, United States	
Loss	5–3	Carl Seumanutafa	TKO (punches)	DH: Dragon House 13	February 2, 2013	1	3:00	Oakland, California, United States	
Win	5–2	Mike Cook	Submission (rear-naked choke)	TWC 16: The Condemned	January 25, 2013	1	0:34	Porterville, California, United States	
Loss	4–2	Freddie Aquitania	Decision (split)	TPF 15: Collision Course	November 15, 2012	3	5:00	Lemoore, California, United States	
Loss	4–1	Brandon Cash	KO (punch)	UPC Unlimited: Up and Comers 12: Turning Point	September 22, 2012	1	0:31	Coarsegold, California, United States	
Win	4–0	C.J. Leveque	Submission (kneebar)	CCFC: The Return	March 3, 2012	1	1:37	Santa Rosa, California, United States	
Win	3–0	Freddie Aquitania	Decision (split)	TPF 11: Redemption	December 2, 2011	3	5:00	Lemoore, California, United States	
Win	2–0	Ray Castaneda	TKO (punches)	TWC 11: Inferno	June 17, 2011	1	1:33	Porterville, California, United States	
Win	1–0	Gary LaFranchi	TKO (submission to punches)	TWC 10: Beatdown	January 21, 2011	1	0:41	Porterville, California, United States	

== See also ==
- List of male mixed martial artists
