= Josh Burns (fighter) =

American MMA fighter (born 1978)

- Born: May 15, 1978 (age 48); Lima, Ohio, United States
- Other names: The Hammer
- Height: 6 ft 1 in (1.85 m)
- Weight: 264 lb (120 kg; 18.9 st)
- Division: Heavyweight (2006–present); Light Heavyweight (2012)
- Reach: 74 1/2 in (189 cm)
- Stance: Orthodox
- Fighting out of: Dearborn, Michigan, United States
- Team: Hammer House/ Darkside Boxing
- Years active: 2006–present

Mixed martial arts record
- Total: 18
- Wins: 8
- By knockout: 4
- By submission: 2
- By decision: 2
- Losses: 10
- By knockout: 5
- By submission: 4
- By decision: 1

Other information
- Mixed martial arts record from Sherdog

Josh Burns (born May 15, 1978) is an American professional bare-knuckle boxer and former mixed martial artist. Since 2022, he has competed for BYB Extreme. Burns currently competes for Bare Knuckle Fighting Championship (BKFC).

== Mixed martial arts career ==
=== Bellator MMA ===
Burns faced TNA wrestler Bobby Lashley on September 5, 2014, at Bellator 123. Burns lost the fight via rear-naked choke submission in the second round.

Burns faced UFC vet Justin Wren at Bellator 141 on August 28, 2015. Burns lost the fight by unanimous decision.

== Bare-knuckle boxing ==
Burns has competed in bare-knuckle boxing since 2017. He was one of the first American fighters to compete in Bare Knuckle Boxing. Known for his KO power. Burns amassed an 8-5-2 record in the British promotion BKB™, before accurate record keeping was permitted.

=== Bare Knuckle Fighting Championship ===
Burns faced Chris Sarro at BKFC 15 on December 11, 2020. He won his BKFC debut by second-round KO.

Burns next faced Frank Tate in a BKFC heavyweight title eliminator at BKFC 17 on April 30, 2021. Burns lost by third-round technical knockout via doctor stoppage.

Burns faced Sam Shewmaker at BKFC 21 on September 10, 2021. Burns won by first-round knockout.

Burns faced Sam Shewmaker in a rematch on August 3, 2024 at BKFC 63. He won the fight by unanimous decision.

== Personal life ==
An Army veteran and is the head of a VIP security firm (JHB Security Services), Burns is a loving father of twelve children.

In October 2018, Burns was convicted for crimes relating to a health fraud case.

== Mixed martial arts record ==
Professional record breakdown
18 matches	8 wins	10 losses
By knockout	4	5
By submission	2	4
By decision	2	1

Res.	Record	Opponent	Method	Event	Date	Round	Time	Location	Notes
Loss	8–10	Josh Parisian	TKO (punches)	TWC Pro Series: Anderson vs. Veerella	November 12, 2016	2	1:50	Lansing, Michigan, United States	
Loss	8–9	Justin Wren	Decision (unanimous)	Bellator 141	August 28, 2015	3	5:00	Temecula, California, United States	
Loss	8–8	Bobby Lashley	Submission (rear naked choke)	Bellator 123	September 5, 2014	2	3:54	Uncasville, Connecticut, United States	
Loss	8–7	Raphael Butler	TKO (retirement)	Bellator 107	November 8, 2013	1	2:14	Thackerville, Oklahoma, United States	
Win	8–6	Matt Eckerle	TKO (punches)	Triple X Cagefighting: Legends 2	October 19, 2013	1	0:15	Mount Clemens, Michigan, United States	
Win	7–6	Jack Rome	Submission (punches)	GC: Gladiator Challenge	September 29, 2012	1	1:38	San Diego, California, United States	Return to Heavyweight.
Loss	6–6	Rich Hale	TKO (punches)	Bellator 69	May 18, 2012	1	0:38	Lake Charles, Louisiana, United States	Light heavyweight debut.
Loss	6–5	Thiago Santos	Submission (rear naked choke)	Bellator 53	October 8, 2011	1	2:23	Miami, Oklahoma, United States	
Loss	6–4	Eric Prindle	TKO (doctor stoppage)	Bellator 40	April 9, 2011	2	5:00	Newkirk, Oklahoma, United States	
Win	6–3	Jeffrey Kugel	TKO (punches)	IFL: The Saint Valentine's Day Massacre	February 18, 2011	1	2:52	Auburn Hills, Michigan, United States	
Loss	5–3	Kelly Gray	TKO ( verbal submission )	MMA Xplosion: Gunderson vs. Sharp	October 10, 2009	1	3:09	Las Vegas, Nevada, United States	
Loss	5–2	Patrick Barrentine	Submission	MMA Big Show: Mayhem	September 12, 2009	1	2:20	Florence, Indiana, United States	
Loss	5–1	Dave Hess	Submission (rear naked choke)	MMA Big Show: Retribution	March 7, 2009	3	N/A	Florence, Indiana, United States	
Win	5–0	Stephen Williams	Decision (split)	Poor Boy Promotions: Return to the River	January 26, 2008	3	5:00	Detroit, Michigan, United States	
Win	4–0	Phillip Hill	Decision (unanimous)	Poor Boy Promotions: Motown Madness	September 1, 2007	3	5:00	Detroit, Michigan, United States	
Win	3–0	James Kilpatrick	Submission (north south choke)	Poor Boy Promotions: Rumble on the River 2	April 21, 2007	2	4:41	Detroit, Michigan, United States	
Win	2–0	Matt O'Connor	KO (punches)	Poor Boy Promotions: Rooster Tail Fight Night 2	August 5, 2006	1	3:22	Detroit, Michigan, United States	
Win	1–0	Gabriel Martinez	TKO (punches)	Poor Boy Promotions: Rumble on the River 1	March 18, 2006	1	0:45	Detroit, Michigan, United States	

=== Mixed martial arts amateur record ===
Amateur record breakdown		
1 match	1 win	0 losses
By submission	1	0

Res.	Record	Opponent	Method	Event	Date	Round	Time	Location	Notes
Win	1–0	Matt Goff	Submission (triangle choke)	KOTC: New Breed	March 7, 2009	2	1:22	Mescalero, New Mexico, United States	

== Bare-knuckle boxing record ==
Professional record breakdown
15 matches	6 wins	9 losses
By knockout	6	5
By decision	0	4

Res.	Record	Opponent	Method	Event	Date	Round	Time	Location	Notes
Loss	6–9	Sam Shewmaker	Decision (unanimous)	BKFC 63	August 3, 2024	5	2:00	Sturgis, South Dakota, United States	
Loss	6–8	Levi Costa	Decision (unanimous)	BYB 11: Brawl in the Pines	August 10, 2023	5	3:00	Pembroke Pines, Florida, United States	
Loss	6–7	D. J. Linderman	TKO (referee stoppage)	BYB 11: Brawl in Doral	March 12, 2022	3	1:40	Doral, Florida, United States	
Loss	6–6	Tony Lopez	Decision (unanimous)	BYB 9: Tampa Brawl	March 12, 2022	5	3:00	Tampa, Florida, United States	
Win	6–5	Sam Shewmaker	KO (punch)	BKFC 21	September 10, 2021	1	0:19	Omaha, Nebraska, United States	
Loss	5–5	Frank Tate	TKO (corner stoppage)	BKFC 17	April 30, 2021	3	1:02	Birmingham, Alabama, United States	BKFC Heavyweight title eliminator.
Win	5–4	Chris Sarro	KO (punches)	BKFC 15	December 11, 2020	2	0:18	Biloxi, Mississippi, United States	
Loss	4–4	Daniel Podmore	TKO (doctor stoppage)	BKB 17	June 8, 2019	3	2:00	Biloxi, Mississippi, United States	
Loss	4–3	Tony Johnson	TKO (doctor stoppage)	BKB 13	September 8, 2018	1	N/A	London, England, United Kingdom	For the interim BKB World Heavyweight Championship.
Win	4–2	Adam Jenkins	KO	BKB 10	March 24, 2018	1	N/A	Liverpool, England, United Kingdom	
Loss	3–2	Mick Terrill	TKO (referee stoppage)	BKB 9	January 13, 2018	5	2:00	Liverpool, England, United Kingdom	For the BKB World Heavyweight Championship.
Win	3–1	Billy Hawthorn	KO	BKB 7	September 9, 2017	2	N/A	Liverpool, England, United Kingdom	
Win	2–1	Neil Derry	KO	BKB 6	July 8, 2017	2	N/A	Coventry, England, United Kingdom	
Win	1–1	Karl Cook	KO	BKB 5	April 22, 2017	1	N/A	Coventry, England, United Kingdom	
Loss	0–1	Hari Miles	Decision (unanimous)	BKB 4	January 14, 2017	3	2:00	Coventry, England, United Kingdom	

== See also ==
- List of Bellator MMA alumni
- List of male mixed martial artists

https://www.detroitnews.com/story/news/local/detroit-city/2018/10/11/mma-fighter-josh-burns-guilty-fraud-case-involving-dr-frank-patino/1606264002/
