= Kerry Schall =

American mixed martial arts fighter

- Born: August 9, 1971 (age 55); Cincinnati, Ohio, United States
- Other names: Meat Truck
- Height: 6 ft 2 in (1.88 m)
- Weight: 265 lb (120 kg; 18 st 13 lb)
- Division: Heavyweight
- Team: Excalibur Fitness
- Years active: 1998–2008; 2010, 2013

Mixed martial arts record
- Total: 37
- Wins: 23
- By knockout: 7
- By submission: 12
- By decision: 1
- By disqualification: 3
- Losses: 13
- By knockout: 6
- By submission: 4
- By decision: 3
- No contests: 1

Other information
- Mixed martial arts record from Sherdog

Kerry Schall (born August 9, 1971) is a retired American mixed martial arts fighter. His nickname "Meat Truck" is for his huge size and punching power.

== Background ==
The Kankakee, Illinois native was a football and wrestling star at Herscher High School outside of Chicago, where he then went on to graduate from the University of Cincinnati with a degree in electrical engineering.

== MMA career and The Ultimate Fighter ==
Schall has fought for many MMA organizations such as the UFC, Fighting Network Rings, and Extreme Challenge. He was on The Ultimate Fighter 2 where he was eliminated on episode 1 due to an injury. He was invited to fight for the UFC at The Ultimate Fighter 2 Finale where he would lose to Keith Jardine by TKO in the 2nd round.

Schall faced Paul Buentello at Nemesis Fighting: MMA Global Invasion on December 10, 2010 He lost the fight via unanimous decision.

Schall would return after a long hiatus against Satoshi Ishii at IGF: GENOME 25 on March 20, 2013. Schall lost the bout via submission in the first round.

== Personal life ==
Schall is married to Amanda Vandeberg RN and he has twin children Andrew and Lauren. He is also stepfather to Jordan, Madison and Koa, Vandeberg's children from her previous marriage to Matt Anoaʻi.

== Mixed martial arts record ==
Professional record breakdown
37 matches	23 wins	13 losses
By knockout	7	6
By submission	12	4
By decision	1	3
By disqualification	3	0
No contests	1	

Res.	Record	Opponent	Method	Event	Date	Round	Time	Location	Notes
Loss	23–13 (1)	Satoshi Ishii	Submission (armbar)	IGF: GENOME 25	March 20, 2013	1	2:43	Fukuoka, Japan	
Loss	23–12 (1)	Paul Buentello	Decision (unanimous)	Nemesis Fighting: MMA Global Invasion	December 10, 2010	3	5:00	Punta Cana, Punta Cana, La Altagracia, Dominican Republic	
Win	23–11 (1)	Justin Gizzard	DQ	Extreme Challenge 111	November 21, 2008	1	3:36	Indiana, United States	
Loss	22–11 (1)	Dave Herman	TKO (knees and punches)	ShoXC: Elite Challenger Series	October 10, 2008	1	1:06	Indiana, United States	
Loss	22–10 (1)	Antoine Hayes	Decision (unanimous)	Adrenaline MMA 1	June 14, 2008	3	5:00	Illinois, United States	
Loss	22–9 (1)	Shane Ott	TKO (punches)	Extreme Challenge 77	April 28, 2007	1	1:23	Ohio, United States	
Win	22–8 (1)	Nathan Kirby	DQ	Extreme Challenge 74	March 10, 2007	N/A	N/A	Iowa, United States	
Win	21–8 (1)	Geza Kalman	Submission (guillotine choke)	XFO 13: Operation Beatdown	November 11, 2006	1	0:25	Illinois, United States	
NC	20–8 (1)	Mario Rinaldi	No Contest (fighters fell from ring)	Absolute Fighting Championships 16	April 22, 2006	1	N/A	Florida, United States	
Win	20–8	Eldred Nunn	Submission (rear-naked choke)	XFO 10: Explosion	March 18, 2006	1	1:31	Illinois, United States	
Loss	19–8	Keith Jardine	TKO (leg kicks)	The Ultimate Fighter 2 Finale	November 5, 2005	2	3:28	Nevada, United States	
Win	19–7	Ulysses Castro	DQ (low blows)	Euphoria: Road to the Titles	October 15, 2004	2	0:20	New Jersey, United States	
Loss	18–7	Kevin Jordan	Submission (rear-naked choke)	XFO 2: New Blood	June 26, 2004	1	2:06	Wisconsin, United States	
Win	18–6	Chris Herring	TKO (submission to punches)	ICE 9	May 7, 2004	1	0:51	Ohio, United States	Herring couldn't continue after Schall landed a punch directly to the eyeball.
Win	17–6	Ray Seraille	KO (punch)	SuperBrawl 35	April 16, 2004	1	2:15	Hawaii, United States	
Win	16–6	Jimmy Sullivan	TKO (submission to strikes)	Extreme Challenge 56	March 26, 2004	1	1:08	Minnesota, United States	
Win	15–6	Demian Decorah	Decision (split)	Extreme Challenge 54	October 12, 2003	3	3:00	Illinois, United States	
Loss	14–6	Greg Wikan	TKO (knee injury)	ICC 1: Retribution	January 12, 2003	1	3:35	Minnesota, United States	
Win	14–5	John Clausen	Submission (guillotine choke)	UW: Godsey vs Wiuff	October 19, 2002	1	0:30	Minnesota, United States	
Win	13–5	Kekumu Cambra	Submission (heel hook)	UCC Hawaii: Eruption in Hawaii	September 17, 2002	1	2:48	Hawaii, United States	
Win	12–5	Steve Friedrichs	Submission (heel hook)	UAGF 2: Ultimate Cage Fighting 2	July 30, 2002	2	0:56	California, United States	
Win	11–5	Mark Smith	Submission (guillotine choke)	RFC 1: The Beginning	July 13, 2002	1	3:46	Nevada, United States	
Loss	10–5	Ben Rothwell	TKO (neck injury)	SB 24: Return of the Heavyweights 2	April 27, 2002	2	2:10	Hawaii, United States	
Loss	10–4	Ben Rothwell	TKO (foot injury)	Extreme Challenge 46	February 16, 2002	1	7:29	Iowa, United States	Extreme Challenge Heavyweight Tournament Final.
Win	10–3	William Hill	Submission (rear-naked choke)	Extreme Challenge 46	February 16, 2002	1	1:23	Iowa, United States	
Win	9–3	Joe Campanella	Submission (armbar)	Extreme Fights 2	January 19, 2002	1	0:30	Ohio, United States	
Win	8–3	Brian Ebersole	Submission (kneebar)	UW: Battle for the Belts	December 8, 2001	1	N/A	Minnesota, United States	
Win	7–3	Rob Smith	Submission (rear-naked choke)	UW: Battle for the Belts	December 8, 2001	1	N/A	Minnesota, United States	
Win	6–3	Lenn Walker	TKO (submission to punches)	Extreme Fights 1	November 29, 2001	1	0:33	Ohio, United States	
Loss	5–3	Fedor Emelianenko	Submission (armbar)	RINGS: World Title Series 1	April 20, 2001	1	1:47	Tokyo, Japan	
Win	5–2	John Dixon	Submission (hammerlock)	RINGS USA: Battle of Champions	March 17, 2001	1	1:19	Iowa, United States	
Loss	4–2	Travis Fulton	TKO (corner stoppage)	ETFN: Extreme Tuesday Night Fights	January 18, 2001	1	6:56	Indiana, United States	
Loss	4–1	Bobby Hoffman	Decision (unanimous)	WEF 9: World Class	May 13, 2000	4	3:00	Indiana, United States	
Win	4–0	JT Corley	TKO (submission to knees)	World Extreme Fighting 6	June 19, 1999	1	N/A	Wheeling, West Virginia, United States	
Win	3–0	Wade Hamilton	TKO (submission to knees)	Extreme Challenge 23	April 2, 1999	1	0:34	Indiana, United States	
Win	2–0	Eddie Moore	Submission (front choke)	Extreme Combat Challenge	June 27, 1998	1	0:32	Indiana, United States	
Win	1–0	Ken Dodson	TKO (punches)	Extreme Combat Challenge	February 17, 1998	1	0:14	Indiana, United States	
