= Eric Prindle =

American mixed martial arts fighter

- Born: August 30, 1976 (age 50); Erie, Pennsylvania, United States
- Other names: The American Soldier
- Height: 6 ft 5 in (196 cm)
- Weight: 265 lb (120 kg; 18 st 13 lb)
- Division: Heavyweight; Super Heavyweight
- Reach: 79 in (201 cm)
- Stance: Orthodox
- Fighting out of: Prescott, Arizona, United States
- Team: CSW; Average Joes MMA
- Years active: 2008-2016; 2018

Mixed martial arts record
- Total: 22
- Wins: 12
- By knockout: 7
- By submission: 3
- By decision: 2
- Losses: 9
- By knockout: 4
- By submission: 3
- By decision: 1
- By disqualification: 1
- No contests: 1

Other information
- University: Yavapai College
- Website: http://ericprindle.com
- Mixed martial arts record from Sherdog

Eric Prindle (born August 30, 1976) is an American Heavyweight mixed martial artist who last competed in 2018. A professional competitor since 2008 he has fought in Bellator MMA and Pancrase, and was the Bellator Season Five Heavyweight Tournament Winner.

== Background ==
Prindle was born in Erie, Pennsylvania but grew up in Phoenix, Arizona and Honolulu, Hawaii. Having developed a passion for combat sports from a young age, Prindle competed in kickboxing, winning two amateur bouts at the age of 12 against opponents twice his age and much larger than himself.

At the age of 18, Prindle enlisted into the United States Army as a weapons specialist and competed in amateur boxing, where he found a wealth of success, going on to win various tournaments, become a five-time All-Army Champion, a four-time Armed Forces Champion, and in all compiled over 100 amateur fights during his time of service. He was with special forces and with the 101st Airborne division. In 2004, Prindle's military career ended. He suffered injuries as a soldier and believes that with the benefits Martial Arts has to offer, it helps him mentally subside the injuries and mental trauma he acquired serving his country.

After taking some time off to be with his family, Prindle transitioned into mixed martial arts and has trained at Erik Paulsons school in California for STX and CSW as well as training on his own and at Average Joes MMA in AZ.

== Mixed martial arts career ==
=== Early career ===
Prindle made his professional debut in 2008 against veteran Jimmy Ambriz and was defeated via submission. However, Prindle would go on to win his next four fights before being invited to compete in Bellator.

=== Bellator ===
Eric made his Bellator debut in April 2011 at Bellator 40 where he defeated Josh Burns via TKO (Doctor Stoppage) at the end of round two. The fight took place on the MTV2 live broadcast.

Prindle entered into the Bellator Season Five Heavyweight Tournament. His first fight was against Abe Wagner on October 1, 2011, at Bellator 52. Prindle won the back-and-forth fight via unanimous decision.

In the semifinal round, Prindle faced Ron Sparks at Bellator 56 and needed to just 40 seconds to KO him in order to advance to the finals.

Prindle faced Thiago Santos in the finals held at Bellator 59. The bout was ruled a No Contest after Santos kicked Prindle in the groin at 1:24 of the first round and Prindle was unable to continue.

Prindle and Santos were scheduled to have a rematch at Bellator 61 on March 16, 2012. However, on March 15, Bellator announced the fight had been pushed back a week to Bellator 62 due to Prindle having "flu-like symptoms." A week later at the Bellator 62 weigh-ins, Santos weighed in 12 pounds overweight for the rescheduled rematch and the bout was called off. Prindle was announced as the Season Five Heavyweight Tournament Winner.

Prindle competed in the Bellator Season Seven Heavyweight Tournament, where he faced Thiago Santos in their long-awaited rematch in the quarter-finals at Bellator 75. Prindle would be disqualified after kicking Santos in the groin.

Prindle was expected to fight Brett Rogers at Bellator 93 on March 21, 2013. However, the bout was cancelled when Prindle pulled out.

In Prindle's next bout with Bellator, he faced Australian Peter Graham at Bellator 104. Prindle lost a hard-fought unanimous decision.

Prindle next fought Javy Ayala at Bellator 111 on March 7, 2014. He lost the fight via TKO at 2:05 in the third round.

Prindle's next fight was against PRIDE veteran James Thompson at Bellator 121 on June 6, 2014. Prindle lost via TKO in the first round.

On June 25, 2014, it was announced that Prindle was released from the promotion, along with 18 other fighters.

=== Post-Bellator ===
Prindle made his return at Pancrase 269 on August 9, 2015. His opponent was Mitsuyoshi Nakai and he won the fight via TKO in the second round. Prindle had a rematch with Nakai on November 28, 2015, and won the fight this time via submission in the first round.

== Bare knuckle boxing ==
Prindle faced Sam Shewmaker at BKFC 1 held on June 2, 2018. He lost the fight via knockout just 18 seconds into the first round.

== Championships and accomplishments ==
- Bellator Fighting Championship
  - Bellator Season Five Heavyweight Tournament Winner

== Mixed martial arts record ==
Professional record breakdown
22 matches	12 wins	9 losses
By knockout	7	4
By submission	3	3
By decision	2	1
By disqualification	0	1
No contests	1	

Res.	Record	Opponent	Method	Event	Date	Round	Time	Location	Notes
Win	12–9 (1)	Jonathan Tsosie	TKO (punches)	MEFC 1: Moore Extreme Fighting Challenge	September 1, 2018	1	2:18	Payson, Arizona, United States	
Loss	11–9 (1)	Evgeny Erokhin	TKO (punches)	Far Eastern Federation of Modern Pankration 204	November 5, 2016	1	4:31	Vladivostok, Russia	Openweight bout.
Loss	11–8 (1)	Paul Buentello	KO (punch)	Abu Dhabi Warriors 4	May 24, 2016	1	1:04	Abu Dhabi, United Arab Emirates	
Win	11–7 (1)	Maurice Jackson	Submission (kimura)	MCF 11	March 19, 2016	1	2:39	Nebraska, United States	Catchweight (275 lbs) bout.
Win	10–7 (1)	Mitsuyoshi Nakai	Submission (americana)	Pancrase 272	November 28, 2015	1	1:59	Honolulu, Hawaii, United States	Openweight bout.
Win	9–7 (1)	Mitsuyoshi Nakai	TKO (punches)	Pancrase 269	August 9, 2015	2	0:40	Tokyo, Japan	Openweight bout.
Loss	8–7 (1)	Brandon Cash	TKO (submission to punches)	The Warriors Cage 22	June 26, 2015	1	2:18	Porterville, California, United States	Super Heavyweight bout.
Loss	8–6 (1)	James Thompson	TKO (punches)	Bellator 121	June 6, 2014	1	1:55	Thackerville, Oklahoma, United States	
Loss	8–5 (1)	Javy Ayala	TKO (punches)	Bellator 111	March 7, 2014	3	2:05	Thackerville, Oklahoma, United States	
Loss	8–4 (1)	Peter Graham	Decision (unanimous)	Bellator 104	October 18, 2013	3	5:00	Cedar Rapids, Iowa, United States	
Win	8–3 (1)	Vince Lucero	TKO (punches)	Imperio MMA	June 15, 2013	1	0:12	Tampico, Mexico	
Loss	7–3 (1)	Thiago Santos	DQ (axe kick to the groin )	Bellator 75	October 5, 2012	1	4:54	Hammond, Indiana, United States	Bellator Season Seven Heavyweight Tournament Quarterfinal.
Loss	7–2 (1)	Cole Konrad	Submission (kimura)	Bellator 70	May 25, 2012	1	1:00	New Orleans, Louisiana, United States	For the Bellator Heavyweight World Championship.
NC	7–1 (1)	Thiago Santos	No Contest (groin kick)	Bellator 59	November 26, 2011	1	1:24	Atlantic City, New Jersey, United States	Bellator Season Five Heavyweight Tournament Final; NC after groin kick.
Win	7–1	Ron Sparks	KO (punch)	Bellator 56	October 29, 2011	1	0:40	Kansas City, Kansas, United States	Bellator Season Five Heavyweight Tournament Semifinal.
Win	6–1	Abe Wagner	Decision (unanimous)	Bellator 52	October 1, 2011	3	5:00	Lake Charles, Louisiana, United States	Bellator Season Five Heavyweight Tournament Quarterfinal.
Win	5–1	Josh Burns	TKO (doctor stoppage)	Bellator 40	April 9, 2011	2	5:00	Newkirk, Oklahoma, United States	
Win	4–1	Steve Whitey	TKO (punches)	Gladiator Challenge: Royal Flush	October 24, 2010	1	1:30	San Jacinto, California, United States	
Win	3–1	Chris Barnett	Decision (majority)	Martial Combat 12	October 16, 2010	3	5:00	Sentosa, Singapore	
Win	2–1	Brad Tidwell	TKO (punches)	FFI: Blood and Sand 7	April 4, 2009	3	N/A	Biloxi, Mississippi, United States	
Win	1–1	Johnathan Tsosie	TKO (submission to punches)	Rage in the Cage 112	July 26, 2008	1	0:24	Prescott, Arizona, United States	
Loss	0–1	Jimmy Ambriz	Submission (north-south choke)	Rage in the Cage 110	May 31, 2008	1	1:31	Phoenix, Arizona, United States	

== Bare knuckle record ==
Professional record breakdown
1 match	0 wins	1 loss
By knockout	0	1

Res.	Record	Opponent	Method	Event	Date	Round	Time	Location	Notes
Loss	0–1	Sam Shewmaker	KO (punch)	BKFC 1	June 2, 2018	1	0:18	Cheyenne, Wyoming, United States	
