= Raphael Butler =

American boxer

- Born: January 4, 1984 (age 42); Chicago, Illinois, United States
- Other names: The Silencer
- Height: 6 ft 3 in (1.91 m)
- Weight: 260 lb (120 kg; 19 st)
- Division: Heavyweight
- Reach: 77.0 in (196 cm)
- Fighting out of: Rochester, Minnesota, United States
- Team: Alliance MMA
- Years active: 2004–2011 (Boxing); 2010–2016 (MMA)

Professional boxing record
- Total: 49
- Wins: 35
- By knockout: 28
- Losses: 12
- By knockout: 7
- No contests: 2

Mixed martial arts record
- Total: 12
- Wins: 9
- By knockout: 6
- By submission: 3
- Losses: 2
- By knockout: 1
- By submission: 1
- Draws: 1

Other information
- Boxing record from BoxRec
- Mixed martial arts record from Sherdog
- Last updated on: May 9, 2013

Raphael Butler (born January 4, 1984) is an American former professional boxer and mixed martial artist who competed from 2004 to 2016.

== Amateur boxing career ==
Butler had a stellar amateur career, winning the 2004 National Golden Gloves Super Heavyweight Championship. Butler represented the 4th Street Gym in his hometown of Rochester, Minnesota.

== Professional boxing career ==
Butler turned professional in 2004. He was seen as a future star in the sport early on, but suffered two TKO losses against journeyman fighters in 2005. In 2006 he took on ESPN house fighter Jason Gavern, and lost a decision. After the loss, Butler ran off a string of victories against marginal opposition before taking on Art Binkowski in a nationally televised showcase bout on ShoBox. Despite dropping Binkowski three times in the first round, Butler tired as the fight went on, and the referee stopped the fight with just 30 seconds left before the final bell, awarding Binkowski a TKO. After six more wins against lesser competition, Butler was knocked out in 6 rounds by contender "Fast" Eddie Chambers on June 20 in the Cayman Islands.

== Mixed martial arts career ==
=== Early career ===
Butler made his professional MMA debut in 2010 and compiled an undefeated record of 5–0 before being signed by Bellator MMA.

=== Bellator MMA ===
Butler made his promotional debut on June 19, 2013, at Bellator 96 against Jeremiah O'Neal and won via first-round knockout.

Butler then won his next two fights under the Bellator banner before fighting Nick Rossborough to a draw at Bellator 119 on May 9, 2014.

Butler then faced Javy Ayala at Bellator 125 on September 19, 2014. Butler was handed his first professional loss via rear-naked choke submission in the first round.

Butler next fought Josh Diekmann at Bellator 134 on February 27, 2015. Butler won via a first-round standing guillotine choke submission.

== Professional boxing record ==
49 fights	35 wins	12 losses
By knockout	28	7
By decision	7	5
No contests	2	

No.	Result	Record	Opponent	Type	Round, time	Date	Location	Notes
49	Loss	35–12 (2)	(United States) Chris Arreola	TKO	3 (10), 0:55	Nov 5, 2011	Leon, Guanajuato, Mexico	
48	Loss	35–11 (2)	(United States) Tye Fields	TKO	6 (10), 2:37	Oct 7, 2011	(Canada) Shaw Conference Centre, Edmonton, Alberta	
47	Loss	35–10 (2)	(United Kingdom) David Price	TKO	1 (8), 1:47	April 27, 2011	(United Kingdom) Olympia London	
46	Loss	35–9 (2)	(Canada) Neven Pajkic	UD	10	Sep 4, 2010	(Canada) Royal York Hotel, Toronto	
45	NC	35–8 (2)	(United States) Joey Abell	NC	1 (10), 3:00	Dec 4, 2009	(United States) Target Center, Minneapolis, Minnesota	For Vacant USA Minnesota State Heavyweight Title
44	Win	35–8 (1)	(United States) Marcus Rhode	TKO	2 (6), 1:30	Sep 12, 2009	(United States) Mickey's Irish Saloon, Rochester, Minnesota	
43	Loss	34–8 (1)	(United States) Malik Scott	UD	8	Dec 13, 2008	(United States) Morongo Casino Resort & Spa, Cabazon, California	
42	Loss	34–7 (1)	(United States) Homero Fonseca	MD	6	Nov 20, 2008	(United States) Crown Plaza Hotel, Houston, Texas	
41	Win	34–6 (1)	(United States) Marvin Hunt	KO	1 (4), 1:35	Nov 1, 2008	(United States) West Junior High School, West Memphis, Arkansas	
40	Win	33–6 (1)	(United States) Travis Fulton	TKO	2 (6), 2:04	Oct 4, 2008	(United States) Graham Arena, Rochester, Minnesota	
39	Win	32–6 (1)	(United States) Lyle McDowell	TKO	1 (6), 0:52	Sep 20, 2008	(United States) Treasure Island Casino, Red Wing, Minnesota	
38	Loss	31–6 (1)	(United States) Homero Fonseca	SD	4	Sep 4, 2008	(United States) Crown Plaza Hotel, Houston, Texas	
37	Loss	31–5 (1)	(United States) Eddie Chambers	TKO	6 (12)	June 20, 2008	Royal Watler Cruise Terminal, Georgetown, Cayman Islands	For USBA Heavyweight Title
36	Win	31–4 (1)	(United States) Otis Tisdale	TKO	4 (6), 1:48	April 26, 2008	(United States) Graham Arena, Rochester, Minnesota	
35	Win	30–4 (1)	(United States) Kerry Biles	KO	1 (6), 0:45	Mar 8, 2008	(United States) Renaissance Hotel, St Louis, Missouri	
34	Win	29–4 (1)	(United States) Sam Comming	UD	4	18/10/2007	Sault Sainte Marie, Michigan, United States	39–37, 40–36, 39–37.
33	Win	28–4 (1)	(United States) Sedreck Fields	UD	4	20/09/2007	Houston, Texas, United States	
32	Win	27–4 (1)	(United States) Clarence Goins	KO	1	24/08/2007	Hinckley, Minnesota, United States	Goins knocked out at 0:39 of the first round.
31	Win	26–4 (1)	(United States) Travis Fulton	TKO	2	29/06/2007	Comstock Park, Michigan, United States	Referee stopped the fight at 1:25 of the second round.
30	Loss	25–4 (1)	(Canada) Art Binkowski	TKO	8 (8), 2:23	April 6, 2007	(United States) Target Center, Minneapolis, Minnesota	
29	Win	25–3 (1)	(United States) Brad Bowers	TKO	1	24/02/2007	Superior, Wisconsin, United States	Referee stopped the fight at 0:29 of the second round.
28	Win	24–3 (1)	(United States) Louis Monaco	DQ	6	12/01/2007	Minneapolis, Minnesota, United States	
27	Win	23–3 (1)	(United States) Cornelius Ellis	TKO	2	01/12/2006	Rochester, Minnesota, United States	Referee stopped the fight at 1:35 of the second round.
26	Win	22–3 (1)	(United States) Matt Green	KO	3	04/11/2006	Kinder, Louisiana, United States	Green knocked out at 1:35 of the third round.
25	Win	21–3 (1)	(United States) Dan Ward	KO	1	23/09/2006	Fort Smith, Arkansas, United States	Ward knocked out at 1:30 of the first round.
24	Win	20–3 (1)	(United States) Eric Starr	TKO	1	14/09/2006	Altoona, Iowa, United States	Referee stopped the fight at 2:04 of the first round.
23	Win	19–3 (1)	(United States) Troy Beets	TKO	3	20/07/2006	Lemoore, California, United States	Referee stopped the fight at 2:19 of the third round.
22	Win	18–3 (1)	(United States) Wallace McDaniel	TKO	1	11/07/2006	Memphis, Tennessee, United States	Referee stopped the fight at 1:28 of the first round.
21	Loss	17–3 (1)	(United States) Jason Gavern	UD	6	14/04/2006	Rancho Mirage, California, United States	55–59, 54–60, 54–60.
20	Win	17–2 (1)	(United States) Forrest Neal	KO	1	17/03/2006	Denver, Colorado, United States	Neal knocked out at 0:52 of the first round.
19	Win	16–2 (1)	(United States) Ronnie Smith	KO	2	11/02/2006	Pueblo, Colorado, United States	Smith knocked out at 1:16 of the second round.
18	Loss	15–2 (1)	(United States) John Clark	TKO	2	17/11/2005	San Jose, California, United States	Referee stopped the fight at 1:41 of the second round after Butler had been down thrice in the fight.
17	Win	15–1 (1)	(United States) Andrew Jackson	KO	1	21/10/2005	Temecula, California, United States	
16	Win	14–1 (1)	(Nigeria) Innocent Otukwu	TKO	3	16/09/2005	Lemoore, California, United States	Referee stopped the bout at 0:39 of the third round.
15	Win	13–1 (1)	(United States) John Dixon	TKO	1	27/08/2005	Thief River Falls, Minnesota, United States	Referee stopped the bout at the end of the first round.
14	Win	12–1 (1)	(United States) Kerry Biles	UD	5	17/07/2005	Denver, Colorado, United States	50–44, 50–44, 50–44.
13	Win	11–1 (1)	(United States) Kerry Biles	UD	4	09/06/2005	Temecula, California, United States	39–36, 39–36, 39–36.
12	Loss	10–1 (1)	(United States) Darrell Provo	TKO	1	15/04/2005	Denver, Colorado, United States	Referee stopped the fight at 1:10 of the first round.
11	Win	10–0 (1)	(United States) Brian Sargent	KO	1	29/01/2005	Black Hawk, Colorado, United States	Sargent knocked out at 0:37 of the first round.
10	Win	9–0 (1)	(Canada) Marcelo Aravena	UD	4	18/12/2004	Fridley, Minnesota, United States	40–35, 40–35, 40–35.
9	Win	8–0 (1)	(Canada) Marcelo Aravena	TD	4	19/11/2004	Mandan, North Dakota, United States	Fight went to scorecards due to an accidental headbutt.
8	Win	7–0 (1)	(United States) David Cleage	TKO	1	12/11/2004	St Paul, Minnesota, United States	Referee stopped the bout at 0:35 of the first round.
7	Win	6–0 (1)	(United States) Glen Morgan	KO	1	29/10/2004	Rochester, Minnesota, United States	Morgan knocked out at 2:40 of the first round.
6	Win	5–0 (1)	(United States) Ross Brantley	KO	1	10/10/2004	Black Hawk, Colorado, United States	Brantley knocked out at 0:30 of the first round.
5	Win	4–0 (1)	(United States) Harold Johnson	TKO	1	02/10/2004	Hinckley, Minnesota, United States	Referee stopped the bout at 0:57 of the first round.
4	Win	3–0 (1)	(United States) Arthur Boyles	KO	1	11/09/2004	Fridley, Minnesota, United States	Boyles knocked out at 0:36 of the first round.
3	NC	2–0 (1)	(United States) Eric Lindsey	ND	1 (4), 1:44	Aug 19, 2004	(United States) Park Plaza Hotel, Houston, Texas	
2	Win	2–0	(United States) Victor Ortiz	TKO	1 (4), 1:51	July 18, 2004	(United States) Pechanga Entertainment Center, Temecula, California	
1	Win	1–0	(United States) Royphy Solieau	TKO	3 (4), 1:02	June 19, 2004	(United States) City Center Pavilion, Reno, Nevada	

== Mixed martial arts record ==
Professional record breakdown
12 matches	9 wins	2 losses
By knockout	6	1
By submission	3	1
By decision	0	0
Draws	1	

Res.	Record	Opponent	Method	Event	Date	Round	Time	Location	Notes
Loss	9–2–1	Tony Johnson	TKO (punches)	Bellator 148	January 29, 2016	3	4:24	Fresno, California, United States	
Win	9–1–1	Josh Diekmann	Submission (standing guillotine)	Bellator 134	February 27, 2015	1	1:04	Uncasville, Connecticut, United States	
Loss	8–1–1	Javy Ayala	Submission (rear-naked choke)	Bellator 125	September 19, 2014	1	1:03	Fresno, California, United States	
Draw	8–0–1	Nick Rossborough	Draw (majority)	Bellator 119	May 9, 2014	3	5:00	Rama, Ontario, Canada	
Win	8–0	Josh Burns	TKO (retirement)	Bellator 107	November 8, 2013	1	2:14	Thackerville, Oklahoma, United States	
Win	7–0	Joseph Bryant	TKO (strikes)	Bellator 105	October 25, 2013	1	1:04	Rio Rancho, New Mexico, United States	
Win	6–0	Jeremiah O'Neal	KO (punches)	Bellator 96	June 19, 2013	1	2:19	Thackerville, Oklahoma, United States	
Win	5–0	Brett Murphy	KO (punch)	Driller Promotions/ SEG: Throwdown at the Crowne 1	September 8, 2012	1	0:13	St. Paul, Minnesota, United States	Won the Minnesota Heavyweight Championship.
Win	4–0	Steven Shaw	Submission (armbar)	Brutaal Fight Night: Violent Night	June 2, 2012	1	4:35	Maplewood, Minnesota, United States	
Win	3–0	Richard White	Submission (punches)	Brutaal Fight Night: Rochester	March 25, 2011	2	3:18	Rochester, Minnesota, United States	
Win	2–0	Jeremy Beck	KO (punches)	Brutaal: Fight Night	February 12, 2011	1	3:36	Red Wing, Minnesota, United States	
Win	1–0	Gabe Hobbs	KO (punch)	Brutaal: Fight Night	October 29, 2010	1	0:36	Welch, Minnesota, United States	

== See also ==
- List of Bellator MMA alumni
- List of mixed martial artists with professional boxing records
