= Josh Diekmann =

American mixed martial artist

- Born: October 9, 1976 (age 50); Westerly, Rhode Island, U.S.
- Other names: The Freight Train
- Height: 6 ft 1 in (1.85 m)
- Weight: 228 lb (103 kg; 16.3 st)
- Division: Heavyweight
- Reach: 73.0 in (185 cm)
- Fighting out of: Groton, Connecticut, United States; New London, Connecticut, United States
- Team: Tri-Force MMA (Pawtucket, Rhode Island); StrikeZone (Groton, Connecticut); Wai Kru MMA (Allston, Massachusetts); Whaling City Boxing (Waterford, Connecticut)
- Years active: 2005-2016

Mixed martial arts record
- Total: 24
- Wins: 15
- By knockout: 11
- By submission: 4
- Losses: 8
- By knockout: 1
- By submission: 6
- By decision: 1
- No contests: 1

Other information
- Mixed martial arts record from Sherdog

Josh Diekmann (born October 9, 1976) is a retired American mixed martial artist. A professional competitor from 2005 until 2016, Diekmann fought in Bellator MMA, the WEC, and CES MMA. Known for being an exciting heavyweight, only one bout during his career ended in a judges' decision.

== Background ==
Born and raised in Westerly, Rhode Island, Diekmann, who is of Italian descent, graduated from Westerly High School in 1995. Diekmann began training in 2002 at the age of 26 at Whaling City Boxing in Waterford, Connecticut, which is owned by Kent Ward, father of current Bellator Welterweight Brennan Ward.

== Mixed martial arts career ==
=== Early career ===
Diekmann had one amateur fight against future UFC competitor Sean Gannon, a Boston police officer best known for defeating Kimbo Slice in non-sanctioned bout. Diekmann lost via TKO in the first round. Diekmann later turned professional in 2005, he won his first six bouts by stoppage before losing to Justin Eilers via TKO at WEC 24. Diekmann would then go 6–2 in his next eight bouts.

=== CES MMA ===
Diekmann faced Josh Hendricks on February 3, 2012, at CES MMA: Extreme Measures. Diekmann would lose via submission in the first round.

The following October, Diekmann was defeated by Tyler King via unanimous decision at CES MMA: Real Pain.

Diekmann got his first win for the promotion when he defeated Chris Guillen via first-round TKO at CES MMA: November to Remember.

Diekmann was scheduled to face Keith Bell at CES MMA 23 on April 25, 2014. The bout was cancelled for unknown reasons.

=== Bellator MMA ===
Diekmann signed a six-fight contract with Bellator MMA and made his Bellator debut on September 7, 2013, at Bellator 98, defeating Parker Porter via TKO in the first round.

Diekmann was expected to face Chris Birchler at Bellator 110 on February 28, 2014. However, the fight was cancelled for unknown reasons. Diekmann was then expected to face Chad Herrick on the same card, however, this bout also did not happen for unknown reasons. Instead, Diekmann faced Manny Lara and the fight ended in a no contest due to an accidental eye poke in round one.

Diekmann faced Mike Wessel at Bellator 123 on September 5, 2014. Diekmann won the fight via knockout in the first round.

Diekmann faced Raphael Butler on February 27, 2015, at Bellator 134. He lost the fight by submission in the first round.

== Personal life ==
Diekmann, who is married and has children, also currently works as a mason. Diekmann lives with his family in Groton, Connecticut.

== Mixed martial arts record ==
Professional record breakdown
24 matches	15 wins	8 losses
By knockout	11	1
By submission	4	6
By decision	0	1
No contests	1	

Res.	Record	Opponent	Method	Event	Date	Round	Time	Location	Notes
Loss	15–8 (1)	Tyler King	Submission (rear-naked choke)	Bellator 163	November 4, 2016	2	1:39	Uncasville, Connecticut, United States	
Loss	15–7 (1)	Ashley Gooch	Submission (rear-naked choke)	CES 32: de Freitas vs. Curtis	January 8, 2016	1	4:30	Lincoln, Rhode Island, United States	
Loss	15–6 (1)	Raphael Butler	Submission (standing guillotine choke)	Bellator 134	February 27, 2015	1	1:04	Uncasville, Connecticut, United States	
Win	15–5 (1)	Mike Wessel	KO (punches)	Bellator 123	September 5, 2014	1	0:47	Uncasville, Connecticut, United States	
NC	14–5 (1)	Manny Lara	NC (accidental eye poke)	Bellator 110	February 28, 2014	1	0:18	Uncasville, Connecticut, United States	
Win	14–5	Chris Guillen	TKO (punches)	CES MMA: November to Remember	November 15, 2013	1	1:15	Ledyard, Connecticut, United States	
Win	13–5	Parker Porter	TKO (punches)	Bellator 98	September 7, 2013	1	1:12	Uncasville, Connecticut, United States	
Loss	12–5	Tyler King	Decision (unanimous)	CES MMA: Real Pain	October 6, 2012	3	5:00	Providence, Rhode Island, United States	
Loss	12–4	Josh Hendricks	Submission (arm-triangle choke)	CES MMA: Extreme Measures	February 3, 2012	1	2:21	Lincoln, Rhode Island, United States	
Win	12–3	Randy Smith	TKO (punches)	CFX 13: Rumble in the Jungle 5	March 12, 2011	1	0:12	Plymouth, Massachusetts, United States	Won the vacant CFX Heavyweight Championship.
Win	11–3	Bobby Favors	KO (punches)	CFX 8: Rumble in the Jungle 3	February 20, 2010	2	3:42	Plymouth, Massachusetts, United States	
Loss	10–3	Christian Morecraft	Submission (rear-naked choke)	CFX 6: Rumble in the Jungle 2	November 14, 2009	1	0:56	Plymouth, Massachusetts, United States	
Win	10–2	David Woodby	TKO (punches)	USFL: War in the Woods 4	September 13, 2008	1	1:01	Ledyard, Connecticut, United States	
Loss	9–2	Chris Guillen	Submission (rear-naked choke)	IFO: Kimmons vs. Yunker	September 21, 2007	2	0:40	Las Vegas, Nevada, United States	
Win	9–1	Pat Schultz	KO (punches)	FFP: Untamed 14	June 16, 2007	1	0:45	Plymouth, Massachusetts, United States	Won the vacant FFP Heavyweight Championship.
Win	8–1	Daron Adams	TKO (punches)	WFL 15: Winter Brawl 2007	February 3, 2007	1	0:54	Revere, Massachusetts, United States	
Win	7–1	Shane McClure	Submission (armbar)	CZ 19: Above and Beyond	December 2, 2006	1	1:08	Revere, Massachusetts, United States	Defended the CZ Heavyweight Championship.
Loss	6–1	Justin Eilers	TKO (punches)	WEC 24	October 12, 2006	1	2:29	Lemoore, California, United States	
Win	6–0	Chris Herring	TKO (submission to punches)	CZ 13: Battle Cry	March 11, 2006	1	0:56	Revere, Massachusetts, United States	Won the vacant CZ Heavyweight Championship.
Win	5–0	Kevin Jordan	TKO (injury)	FFP: Untamed 3	March 4, 2006	1	0:10	Brockton, Massachusetts, United States	
Win	4–0	Dana Blouin	KO (punch)	WFL 5: Winter Brawl 2006	February 4, 2006	1	N/A	Revere, Massachusetts, United States	
Win	3–0	David Woodby	Submission (rear-naked choke)	Mass Destruction 21	July 16, 2005	1	2:35	Fall River, Massachusetts, United States	
Win	2–0	Richard Wilson	Submission (armbar)	CZ 11: Blood Brothers	June 25, 2005	1	0:33	Revere, Massachusetts, United States	
Win	1–0	Joe Gomes	TKO (punches)	WFL 1: Winter Brawl 2005	February 5, 2005	1	0:24	Revere, Massachusetts, United States	

== See also ==
- List of male mixed martial artists
