= Yusuke Kawaguchi =

Japanese professional wrestler and MMA fighter

Yusuke Kawaguchi 川口雄介
- Born: August 14, 1980 (age 46); Akita, Japan
- Native name: 川口雄介
- Other names: Crusher
- Nationality: Japanese
- Height: 6 ft 0 in (1.83 m)
- Weight: 253 lb (115 kg; 18 st 1 lb)
- Division: Heavyweight
- Stance: Orthodox
- Fighting out of: Akita, Japan
- Team: Blue Dog Gym
- Rank: black belt in Judo
- Years active: 2007–present

Mixed martial arts record
- Total: 31
- Wins: 18
- By knockout: 8
- By submission: 1
- By decision: 9
- Losses: 13
- By knockout: 9
- By submission: 1
- By decision: 3

Other information
- Mixed martial arts record from Sherdog
- Last updated on: August 1, 2010

Yusuke Kawaguchi (Japanese: 川口雄介, Kawaguchi Yusuke) (born August 14, 1980) is a Japanese mixed martial artist and professional wrestler, who fights in the heavyweight division. He is the former DEEP Megaton Champion, and has also fought in DREAM, M-1 Global and KSW.

== Judo ==
Yusuke Kawaguchi came in third place at the high school-level national Judo championships and third place at the 1999 University Judo Championships in the 100 kg weight class.

== Mixed martial arts ==
=== DEEP ===
Kawaguchi made his mixed martial arts debut on April 13, 2007, at DEEP: 29th Impact and defeated his opponent Hirotaka Fujiyama by majority decision. He went on to win his next two fights by way of knockout in the first round and in 2008, he took part in the DEEP Megaton Grand Prix. He TKO'd Nobuyoshi Takahara in the preliminary round and advanced to the quarter-finals where he faced former sumo wrestler Wakashoyo. Wakashoyo rushed Kawaguchi at the beginning of the fight and was knocked out after just 16 seconds. Kawaguchi then advanced to the final stage, where the semi-finals and final were held in one night. In the semis, he came up against Shunji Kosaka, and beat him after his corner threw in the towel within 45 seconds of the first round. Shunsuke Inoue was then to be his opponent in the final. After two four-minute rounds, Kawaguchi emerged the victor by way of split decision to become the DEEP Megaton Champion.

On October 23, 2008, Kawaguchi defended his title against Mongolian challenger Baru Harn a.k.a. Seryu at DEEP: 38th Impact. He blitzed Seryu with machinegun punches in the first round of the fight but could not finish him. With both men gassed by the second period, the fight quickly devolved into moments of sloppy punching and leaning on each other in the clinch. A majority decision for Kawaguchi resulted after two judges ruled in his favor, with one judge ruling it a draw.

Seigo Mizuguchi, who Kawaguchi already beat in 2007, then challenged him at DEEP: 44th Impact on October 10, 2009. Kawaguchi opened the bout with an initial barrage of machine gun punches, dropping Mizuguchi in a corner. Mizuguchi recovered, however, tossed the champ over his hip in the harai-goshi and landed in side control, where he squeezed Kawaguchi's head with a neck crank. Kawaguchi escaped and, as the visibly fitter of the two, proceeded to string together big punches for the rest of the bout. Gassed but still tough, Mizuguchi ate all of Kawaguchi's punches while throwing winging singles of his own. Though his face was red and swollen, Mizuguchi would not go down, prompting Kawaguchi to switch tactics midway through the bout, as he chopped him down with kicks. When Mizuguchi limped into a corner at the 1:27 mark of the third round, cornerman Kazuhiro Nakamura threw in the towel. Referee Yoshinori Umeki did not see the towel but stopped the bout soon after.

Another challenger then stepped up, this time in the form of Guam'sRoque Martinez. He, too, was unable to defeat Kawaguchi who won by unanimous decision after three rounds.

=== M-1 Challenge ===
In 2009, he represented Team Japan in the M-1 Challenge. His first fight came against England's Rob Broughton on April 29, where he recorded the first loss of his career. Every time Kawaguchi stepped in to engage, Broughton's left hook was there to meet him, and every time Kawaguchi tried to retreat, Broughton's sharp left jab was there to chase him. Broughton also controlled Kawaguchi on the mat, as he shut him down in both rounds and won via unanimous decision.

Kawaguchi's second fight representing Japan was on April 16 in the Netherlands. He took on Cirio Tejera of Spain and won by unanimous decision after two rounds.

=== KSW ===
On May 7, 2010, Kawaguchi faced 5-time World's Strongest Man Mariusz Pudzianowski at KSW XIII: Kumite in Katowice, Poland. Pudzianowski rushed Kawaguchi at the opening bell and took him down with a lateral drop, but Kawaguchi proved tougher than anticipated. A quickly gassing Pudzianowski had to dig deep to keep control of the fight after he failed to finish with the opening salvo. Kawaguchi got some strikes in on the Pole in the second round, but Pudzian scored two takedowns, likely the convincing factor for the judges, who ruled in favor of Pudzianowski, who won by unanimous decision.

=== DREAM ===
Kawaguchi made his DREAM debut against James Thompson at DREAM.16 and won via a controversial split decision.

== Professional wrestling ==
As a professional wrestler, Kawaguchi worked exclusively for the Inoki Genome Federation (IGF), where he performed under the ring name Crusher Kawaguchi (クラッシャー川口, Kurasshā Kawaguchi). He retired in 2016.

== Championships and accomplishments ==
- DEEP
  - DEEP Megaton Champion (1 Time, First)
  - Three Successful Title Defenses
  - 2008 DEEP Megaton Grand Prix Tournament Winner

== Kickboxing record ==
Kickboxing Record
0 Wins, 1 Losses
Date	Result	Opponent	Event	Location	Method	Round	Time	Record
2014-09-07	Loss	(Iran) Prince Ali	HEAT 33	Nagoya, Japan	TKO	3	0:47	0–1
Kickboxing bout
Legend: Win Loss Draw/No contest Notes

== Mixed martial arts record ==
Professional record breakdown
31 matches	18 wins	13 losses
By knockout	8	9
By submission	1	1
By decision	9	3

Res.	Record	Opponent	Method	Event	Date	Round	Time	Location	Notes
Loss	18–13	Ryo Sakai	TKO (punches)	Deep: 84 Impact: Differ Ariake Final Day	June 30, 2018	1	2:36	Tokyo, Japan	
Loss	18–12	Aorigele	TKO (punches)	Road FC 34	November 19, 2016	1	2:38	Shijiazhuang, China	Openweight bout.
Win	18–11	Kozo Urita	Decision (unanimous)	Grachan / Blue Dog Gym – Grachan 25 / BFC Vol.2	October 10, 2016	2	5:00	Tokyo, Japan	
Loss	17–11	Richard Odoms	KO (knee)	WSOF-GC 2 – World Series of Fighting Global Championship: Japan 1	February 7, 2016	1	3:29	Tokyo, Japan	
Win	17–10	Yoon Seob Kwak	Submission (arm-triangle choke)	Real Fight Championship 3	December 5, 2015	1	3:18	Yokohama, Japan	
Loss	16–10	Mu Bae Choi	TKO (punches)	Road FC 24	July 25, 2015	2	4:50	Tokyo, Japan	
Loss	16–9	Justin Willis	TKO (punches)	Inoki Bom-Ba-Ye 2014	December 31, 2014	1	0:43	Tokyo, Japan	Openweight bout.
Win	16–8	Fumio Yoshimura	TKO (punches)	BFC: Blue Dog Fighting Charity Match Vol.1	June 29, 2014	1	1:17	Tokyo, Japan	
Loss	15–8	Brett Rogers	KO (punches)	Inoki Genome Fight 1	April 4, 2014	1	0:28	Tokyo, Japan	
Loss	15–7	Alex Huddleston	KO (punches)	IGF - Genome 29	October 26, 2013	3	5:00	Tokyo, Japan	
Win	15–6	Se Yun Kim	TKO	Gladiator 61 – Bushido	September 29, 2013	1	0:20	Tokyo, Japan	
Win	14–6	Justin Morton	Decision (Unanimous)	Tenkaichi Fight – Tenkaichi Fight 68	September 8, 2013	2	5:00	Okinawa, Japan	
Loss	13–6	Rolles Gracie Jr.	Submission (arm-triangle choke)	Inoki-Bom-Be-Ye 2012	December 31, 2012	1	2:00	Tokyo, Japan	
Loss	13–5	Jörgen Kruth	TKO (punches and elbows)	Rumble of the Kings 6	November 26, 2011	1	3:18	Stockholm, Sweden	
Loss	13–4	Soa Palelei	TKO (punches)	AFC Fight Nite 01	June 25, 2011	1	4:20	Melbourne, Australia	
Loss	13–3	Peter Graham	TKO (elbows)	Xtreme MMA 3	November 5, 2010	1	N/A	Sydney, Australia	
Win	13–2	Edmund Cavalcante Jr.	Decision (unanimous)	Gladiator 11: G-1	October 9, 2010	2	5:00	Tokyo, Japan	
Win	12–2	James Thompson	Decision (split)	DREAM.16	September 25, 2010	2	5:00	Nagoya, Japan	
Loss	11–2	Mariusz Pudzianowski	Decision (unanimous)	KSW 13: Kumite	May 7, 2010	2	5:00	Katowice, Poland	
Win	11–1	Roque Martinez	Decision (unanimous)	Deep: Cage Impact 2009	December 19, 2009	3	5:00	Tokyo, Japan	Defended DEEP Megaton title.
Win	10–1	Seigo Mizuguchi	TKO (leg kicks)	Deep: 44 Impact	October 10, 2009	3	1:27	Tokyo, Japan	Defended DEEP Megaton title.
Win	9–1	Cirio Tejera	Decision (unanimous)	M-1 Challenge 18: Netherlands Day Two	August 16, 2009	2	5:00	Hilversum, Netherlands	
Loss	8–1	Rob Broughton	Decision (unanimous)	M-1 Challenge 14: Japan	April 29, 2009	2	5:00	Tokyo, Japan	
Win	8–0	Baru Harn	Decision (majority)	Deep: 38 Impact	October 23, 2008	2	5:00	Tokyo, Japan	Defended DEEP Megaton title.
Win	7–0	Shunsuke Inoue	Decision (split)	Deep: Megaton Grand Prix 2008 Finals	August 2, 2008	2	4:00	Tokyo, Japan	Grand Prix final bout. Won DEEP Megaton title.
Win	6–0	Shunji Kosaka	TKO (corner stoppage)	Deep: Megaton Grand Prix 2008 Finals	August 2, 2008	1	0:45	Tokyo, Japan	Grand Prix semi-final bout.
Win	5–0	Wakashoyo	TKO (punches)	Deep: Megaton Grand Prix 2008 Semifinal	May 24, 2008	1	0:16	Tokyo, Japan	Grand Prix quarter-final bout.
Win	4–0	Nobuyoshi Takahara	TKO (punches)	Deep: Megaton Grand Prix 2008 Opening Round	March 29, 2008	1	0:40	Tokyo, Japan	Grand Prix prelim round bout.
Win	3–0	Seigo Mizuguchi	TKO (punches)	Deep: 32 Impact	October 10, 2007	1	2:07	Tokyo, Japan	
Win	2–0	Iro Zeki	KO (punch)	Deep: 31 Impact	August 5, 2007	1	1:06	Tokyo, Japan	
Win	1–0	Hirotaka Fujiyama	Decision (majority)	Deep: 29 Impact	April 13, 2007	2	5:00	Tokyo, Japan	

== See also ==
- List of male mixed martial artists
