= Alex Huddleston =

American MMA fighter

- Born: August 11, 1986 (age 40); Sedalia, Missouri, United States
- Other names: The Shaved Gorilla
- Height: 6 ft 6 in (198 cm)
- Weight: 255 lb (116 kg; 18 st 3 lb)
- Division: Heavyweight
- Reach: 81.5 in (207 cm)
- Team: K2L Grindhouse
- Years active: 2011-2015

Mixed martial arts record
- Total: 8
- Wins: 6
- By knockout: 2
- By submission: 2
- By decision: 2
- Losses: 2
- By knockout: 1
- By decision: 1

Other information
- Mixed martial arts record from Sherdog

Alex Huddleston (born August 11, 1986) is a retired American mixed martial artist. A professional competitor from 2011 until 2015, Huddleston formerly competed for Bellator, Titan FC and Inoki Genome Federation. He is presently a Brazilian Jiu Jitsu Black Belt, and actively competes in the jiu jitsu circuit. He is an instructor at Easton Boulder Colorado.

== Mixed martial arts career ==
=== Early career ===
Huddleston began his professional MMA career in July 2011. He compiled a record of four wins and just one loss in his first five bouts, with victories over Daniel Gallemore and Yusuke Kawaguchi, before signing with Bellator.

=== Bellator MMA ===
In his Bellator debut, Huddleston faced Derek Bohi at Bellator 130 on October 24, 2014. The pair previously met in an amateur bout at a Titan FC event in 2011, which Huddleston won via first-round knockout. Huddleston would defeat Bohi for a second time, winning via TKO in the first round.

Huddleston next faced fellow up-and-comer Javy Ayala at Bellator 139 on June 26, 2015. Huddleston won via rear-naked choke submission in the first round, moments after dropping Ayala with a left hand.

Huddleston faced Augusto Sakai at Bellator 145 on November 6, 2015. Huddleston knocked Sakai down after connecting with a right hand in the last seconds of the third round, but was unable to finish the fight and lost via unanimous decision.

== Mixed martial arts record ==
Professional record breakdown
8 matches	6 wins	2 losses
By knockout	2	1
By submission	2	0
By decision	2	1

Res.	Record	Opponent	Method	Event	Date	Round	Time	Location	Notes
Loss	6–2	Augusto Sakai	Decision (unanimous)	Bellator 145	November 6, 2015	3	5:00	St. Louis, Missouri, United States	
Win	6–1	Javy Ayala	Submission (rear-naked choke)	Bellator 139	June 26, 2015	1	1:12	Mulvane, Kansas, United States	
Win	5–1	Derek Bohi	TKO (punches)	Bellator 130	October 24, 2014	1	4:04	Mulvane, Kansas, United States	
Win	4–1	Yusuke Kawaguchi	Decision (unanimous)	IGF: Genome 29	October 26, 2013	3	5:00	Tokyo, Japan	
Win	3–1	Carl Postma	TKO (punches)	Shinzo Fight Sport	August 16, 2013	1	2:45	Guatemala City, Guatemala	
Win	2–1	Travis Ramirez	Submission (arm-triangle choke)	Ultimate Top Team Fights 8	July 21, 2012	1	1:34	Colorado Springs, Colorado, United States	
Loss	1–1	Justyn Riley	TKO (punches and elbows)	Titan FC 20	September 23, 2011	2	4:39	Kansas City, Kansas, United States	
Win	1–0	Daniel Gallemore	Decision (unanimous)	Titan FC 19	July 29, 2011	3	5:00	Kansas City, Kansas, United States	

== Submission grappling record ==
? Matches, ? Wins, ? Losses, ? Draws
Result	Weight category	Opponent	Method	Event	Date
Loss	Super Heavyweight	M. Gimenis	Decision	Fight 2 Win 110	27 April 2019
Loss	Absolute Division	D. Bell	Points	2018 IBJJF Denver Fall Open	2 December 2018
Win	Super Heavyweight	G. Gonzaga	Decision	Fight 2 Win Pro 80	14 July 2018
Win	Absolute Division	T. Weisgram	Other	2018 IBJJF Denver Open No-Gi	19 May 2018
Win	Heavyweight	C. Farias	Decision	Fight 2 Win Pro 75	19 May 2018
Loss	Ultra Heavyweight	A. Agazarm	Points	2018 IBJJF Denver Open	19 May 2018
Loss	Heavyweight	A. Sachnoff	Decision	Fight 2 Win Pro 74	11 May 2018
Win	Super Heavyweight	D. Grayson	Rear naked choke	Fight 2 Win Pro 19	3 December 2016
Loss	260lbs	D. Richards	Decision	Fight 2 Win Pro 18	18 November 2016
Win	240lbs	S. Rodriguez	Decision	Fight 2 Win Pro 9	30 July 2016
