= Thiago Santos (fighter, born 1986) =

Mixed martial arts fighter

- Born: November 21, 1986 (age 39); Rio de Janeiro, Brazil
- Other names: Big Monster
- Height: 6 ft 3 in (1.91 m)
- Weight: 264.8 lb (120.1 kg; 18.91 st)
- Division: Heavyweight
- Reach: 76.5 in (194 cm)
- Stance: Orthodox
- Fighting out of: Rio de Janeiro, Brazil
- Team: Top Brother
- Rank: Black belt in Brazilian jiu-jitsu
- Years active: 2007–present

Mixed martial arts record
- Total: 18
- Wins: 12
- By knockout: 4
- By submission: 4
- By decision: 2
- Unknown: 2
- Losses: 5
- By knockout: 4
- By submission: 1
- No contests: 1

Other information
- Mixed martial arts record from Sherdog

Thiago Santos is a Brazilian mixed martial arts fighter currently competing in the Heavyweight division. A professional competitor since 2007, Santos has formerly fought for Bellator MMA and was a finalist in their Season Five Heavyweight Tournament.

== Mixed martial arts career ==
=== Early career ===
Santos made his professional MMA debut in October 2007. He fought in a one night tournament against Shamil Abdurahimov at IAFC - Mayor's Cup 2009 and won via unanimous decision. He then went on to fight Alexey Oleynik the same exact day and suffered the first loss of his career.

He then rebounded from that loss by knocking out Geronimo dos Santos in the first round at Amazon Fight 3. After that fight he faced Ubiratan Marinho Lima and won via DQ at Amazon Fight 4.

=== Bellator ===
In April 2011, Bellator announced that they have signed Santos and he will make his promotional debut on May 21, 2011, at Bellator 45 against Derrick Lewis. If Santos is victorious then he will earn a spot in the Bellator Season Five Heavyweight Tournament. Santos suffered an undisclosed injury, forcing him out of his Bellator debut.

Santos was originally scheduled to face Blagoi Ivanov in the opening round of the Bellator Season Five Heavyweight Tournament at Bellator 52. Santos, however, was unable to travel from Brazil for the event and was replaced by Zak Jensen.

Santos faced Josh Burns at Bellator 53 in a bout to determine the Heavyweight Tournament reserve fighter. He won the fight via submission in the first round. He was to face Blagoi Ivanov in the semifinal of the tourney on October 29, 2011, at Bellator 56, after Mike Hayes was forced out of the tournament due to injury. Ivanov subsequently had to pull out of the bout due to an injury and was replaced by Neil Grove. Santos won via submission in the first round.

Santos faced Eric Prindle in the finals held at Bellator 59. The bout was ruled a No Contest after Santos kicked Prindle in the groin at 1:24 of the first round and Prindle was unable to continue. The two were scheduled to rematch at Bellator 61 on March 16, 2012. However, on March 15, Bellator announced the fight had been pushed back a week to Bellator 62 due to Prindle having "flu-like symptoms." A week later at the Bellator 62 weigh-ins, Santos weighed in 12 pounds overweight for the rescheduled rematch and the bout was called off. As a result of Santos' inability to make weight, Prindle was announced as the Season Five Heavyweight Tournament Winner.

Santos competed Bellator Season Seven Heavyweight Tournament, and faced Eric Prindle in their long awaited rematch in the quarter-finals at Bellator 75 on October 5. Santos became the recipient of a groin kick from Eric Prindle, and was unable to continue, winning by disqualification.

In the semi-finals, Santos faced Rich Hale at Bellator 79 on November 2, 2012. Despite rocking Hale early, Santos would lose via TKO at 3:31 in the first round.

After nearly a year away from MMA, Santos returned to face promotional newcomer Javy Ayala at Bellator 102. Santos lost the fight via knockout in the first round.

=== The Ultimate Fighter: Brazil 3 ===
Santos was selected for The Ultimate Fighter: Brazil 3 along with 32 fighters for the preliminary fights to enter the house. He faced Marcos Rogério de Lima in the preliminaries and despite the size advantage, he lost the fight via submission (guillotine choke) in the first round.

=== Independent promotions ===
Santos faced Geronimo dos Santos in a rematch at Roraima Show Fight 13 on November 9, 2014. Santos lost the fight via TKO in the first round, suffering his third consecutive loss by knockout or TKO.

Santos faced Vinicius Lima at Face to Face 9 on December 20, 2014. He lost the fight via TKO due to punches in the second round.

== Championships and accomplishments ==
- Bellator Fighting Championships
  - Bellator Season Five Heavyweight Tournament Runner-Up

== Mixed martial arts record ==
Professional record breakdown
| 18 matches | 12 wins | 5 losses |
| By knockout | 4 | 4 |
| By submission | 4 | 1 |
| By decision | 2 | 0 |
| By disqualification | 2 | 0 |
| No contests | 1 | |

| Res. | Record | Opponent | Method | Event | Date | Round | Time | Location | Notes |
|---|---|---|---|---|---|---|---|---|---|
| Win | 12–5 (1) | Wanderson Souza | TKO (punches) | XForce MMA 6 | November 11, 2017 | 2 | N/A | Rio de Janeiro, Rio de Janeiro, Brazil | Won the vacant XForce Heavyweight Championship. |
| Loss | 11–5 (1) | Vinicius Lima | KO (punches) | Face to Face 9 | December 20, 2014 | 2 | 3:57 | Rio de Janeiro, Rio de Janeiro, Brazil | |
| Loss | 11–4 (1) | Geronimo dos Santos | TKO (punches) | Roraima Show Fight 13 | November 9, 2014 | 1 | 2:53 | Boa Vista, Roraima, Brazil | |
| Loss | 11–3 (1) | Javy Ayala | KO (punches) | Bellator 102 | October 4, 2013 | 1 | 5:00 | Visalia, California, United States | |
| Loss | 11–2 (1) | Rich Hale | TKO (punches) | Bellator 79 | November 2, 2012 | 1 | 3:31 | Rama, Ontario, Canada | Bellator Season Seven Heavyweight Tournament Semifinal. |
| Win | 11–1 (1) | Eric Prindle | DQ (groin kick) | Bellator 75 | October 5, 2012 | 1 | 4:54 | Hammond, Indiana, United States | Bellator Season Seven Heavyweight Tournament Quarter-final. |
| NC | 10–1 (1) | Eric Prindle | No Contest (groin kick) | Bellator 59 | November 26, 2011 | 1 | 1:24 | Atlantic City, New Jersey, United States | Bellator Season Five Heavyweight Tournament Final. |
| Win | 10–1 | Neil Grove | Submission (rear-naked choke) | Bellator 56 | October 29, 2011 | 1 | 0:38 | Kansas City, Kansas, United States | Bellator Season Five Heavyweight Tournament Semifinal; Replaced an injured Mike Hayes. |
| Win | 9–1 | Josh Burns | Submission (rear-naked choke) | Bellator 53 | October 8, 2011 | 1 | 2:23 | Miami, Oklahoma, United States | Bellator Season Five Heavyweight Tournament Reserve Bout. |
| Win | 8–1 | Ubiratan Marinho Lima | DQ (illegal punches to the back) | AF: Amazon Fight 4 | August 13, 2010 | 2 | 3:49 | Belém, Brazil | |
| Win | 7–1 | Geronimo dos Santos | KO (punches) | AF: Amazon Fight 3 | May 13, 2010 | 1 | 3:35 | Belém, Brazil | |
| Loss | 6–1 | Alexey Oleynik | Submission (rear-naked choke) | Union of Veterans of Sport: Mayor's Cup 2009 | November 27, 2009 | 1 | 4:22 | Novosibirsk, Russia | |
| Win | 6–0 | Shamil Abdurakhimov | Decision (unanimous) | Union of Veterans of Sport: Mayor's Cup 2009 | November 27, 2009 | 3 | 3:00 | Novosibirsk, Russia | |
| Win | 5–0 | Bruno Silva | Submission (rear-naked choke) | Delfim Brazuka Nocaute | October 25, 2008 | 1 | 2:49 | Rio de Janeiro, Brazil | |
| Win | 4–0 | Antonio Conceição | Decision (unanimous) | WOCS: Watch Out Combat Show 1 | May 10, 2008 | 3 | 5:00 | Rio de Janeiro, Brazil | |
| Win | 3–0 | Marcelo Mendes | Submission (neck crank) | RH: Rio Heroes 10 | October 16, 2007 | 1 | 4:40 | Osasco, Brazil | |
| Win | 2–0 | Leonardo Guarabya | KO (punches) | RH: Rio Heroes 10 | October 16, 2007 | 1 | 1:14 | Osasco, Brazil | |
| Win | 1–0 | Fabio Santos | TKO (submission to punches) | RH: Rio Heroes 10 | October 16, 2007 | 1 | 0:57 | Osasco, Brazil | |
