= Lolohea Mahe =

American MMA fighter (born 1982)

- Born: 1982 (age 43–44); Maui, Hawaii
- Nationality: Tongan
- Height: 6 ft 1 in (1.85 m)
- Weight: 264 lb (120 kg; 18.9 st)
- Division: Heavyweight; Super Heavyweight
- Stance: Orthodox
- Fighting out of: Kahului, Maui, Hawaii
- Team: I & I Training Center
- Years active: 2007–2017

Mixed martial arts record
- Total: 16
- Wins: 11
- By knockout: 10
- By decision: 1
- Losses: 4
- By knockout: 4
- Draws: 1

Other information
- Mixed martial arts record from Sherdog

Lolohea Mahe (born 1982) is a Tongan mixed martial artist who last competed in the Super Heavyweight division. A professional competitor since 2007, he formerly competed for Strikeforce and King of the Cage.

== Background ==
Mahe is from Maui, Hawaii and is of Samoan and Tongan descent. Mahe's father was a rugby player but would later become a preacher while Mahe's mother taught Sunday school. To this day, Mahe sings in his church's choir, where his father still preaches, and Mahe's brother is the musical director of this same church. Mahe lived four houses away from future UFC veteran and winner of The Ultimate Fighter 3, Kendall Grove. The two were close friends growing up and often would fight each other as a form of recreation during their high school years, putting on gloves and even making videos of their fights. Before becoming a professional mixed martial arts fighter, Mahe spent five years in prison. In addition to his career in mixed martial arts, Mahe had a job delivering flowers.

== Mixed martial arts career ==
=== Early career ===
Mahe began his career against John Rosa, who was then undefeated, at the FFM 3 event in October 2007. Mahe took this fight even though he had no previous formal mixed martial arts training but was victorious, defeating Rosa via submission (strikes) in the first round. He followed this up with a victory over Desi Miner via TKO (punches) at 2:12 of the first round.

Mahe then defeated Vilatonu Fonokalaifi via TKO (injury) in the second round. Mahe's next fight was against future Ultimate Fighter veteran, Scott Junk. After three rounds, it went to the judges decision and the fight was declared a draw, giving Mahe his first non-stoppage and a record of 3–0–1.

Mahe bounced back against Pama Fuga in June 2009, defeating him via TKO (punches) at 1:49 of the first round.

=== Strikeforce ===
Mahe then signed for Strikeforce and made his promotional debut in March 2010, against Lavar Johnson, who held a record of 13–3 prior to the fight. The fight also headlined the ShoMMA card, which was titled Strikeforce Challengers: Johnson vs. Mahe.

Late into the second round, Johnson was able to pick up the TKO win (via punches), handing Mahe his first professional loss as well as a 45-day medical suspension.

Mahe fought future UFC veteran Shane Del Rosario on July 23, 2010 at Strikeforce Challengers: del Rosario vs. Mahe losing via TKO in the first round.

== Personal life ==
On January 27, 2010, Mahe was arrested in Lahaina, Hawaii after a fight broke out between him and a group of men in the Lahaina Cannery Mall parking lot at 1:25 am. The trouble started inside Lulu's Lahaina Surf Club & Grill inside the shopping center and Mahe was seen "grabbing and shoving" several other large men. When police officers arrived and tried to break it up, he lunged at them and was Tased. He and another man were charged with disorderly conduct and released after posting $100 bail.

Mahe and his family are Methodists.

== Mixed martial arts record ==
Professional record breakdown
16 matches	11 wins	4 losses
By knockout	9	4
By submission	1	0
By decision	1	0
Draws	1	

Res.	Record	Opponent	Method	Event	Date	Round	Time	Location	Notes
Win	11–4–1	Raymond Lopez	Decision (unanimous)	X-1: World Events 47	June 24, 2017	3	5:00	Honolulu, Hawaii, United States	
Win	10–4–1	Jimmy Ambriz	TKO (submission to punches)	X-1: Armed and Dangerous	April 29, 2017	1	0:37	Wailuku, Hawaii, United States	
Win	9–4–1	Trent Starding	KO	X-1: The Return	September 24, 2016	1	0:30	Wailuku, Hawaii, United States	Super Heavyweight debut.
Loss	8–4–1	Andenilson Clementino	TKO (punches)	KOTC: Unsigned	June 8, 2013	1	0:42	Maui, Hawaii, United States	
Win	8–3–1	Rob Jackson	TKO (punches)	KOTC: Devastation	April 11, 2013	1	1:37	Highland, California, United States	
Loss	7–3–1	Cody East	TKO (punches)	KOTC: Regulators	January 19, 2013	1	3:01	Scottsdale, Arizona, United States	
Win	7–2–1	Edwin Dewees	TKO (punches)	Maui Fighting Championships	December 15, 2012	1	1:37	Maui, Hawaii, United States	Won MFC Heavyweight Championship.
Win	6–2–1	Desi Miner	TKO (punches)	KOTC: Mana	October 20, 2012	2	4:27	Honolulu, Hawaii, United States	
Win	5–2–1	Henry Bell	TKO (punches)	X-1: Champions 3	March 12, 2011	1	1:49	Honolulu, Hawaii, United States	
Loss	4–2–1	Shane del Rosario	TKO (knees and punches)	Strikeforce Challengers: del Rosario vs. Mahe	July 23, 2010	1	3:48	Everett, Washington, United States	
Loss	4–1–1	Lavar Johnson	TKO (punches)	Strikeforce Challengers: Johnson vs. Mahe	March 26, 2010	2	3:29	Fresno, California, United States	Mahe missed weight by 2 lbs.
Win	4–0–1	Pama Fuga	TKO (punches)	UNU 2 Operation: Fire at Will	June 13, 2009	1	1:49	United States	
Draw	3–0–1	Scott Junk	Draw	X-1: New Beginning	February 27, 2009	3	5:00	Hawaii, United States	
Win	3–0	Vilatonu Fonokalaifi	TKO (injury)	Niko Vitale Promotions	April 18, 2008	2	N/A	United States	
Win	2–0	Desi Miner	TKO (punches)	X-1 Events: Champions	January 26, 2008	1	2:12	United States	
Win	1–0	John Rosa	TKO (punches)	FFM 3	October 13, 2007	1	N/A	United States	
