= Carl Seumanutafa =

Samoan mixed martial artist

- Born: Carl Seumanutafa; June 15, 1983 (age 43); Savaiʻi, Western Samoa
- Other names: Badwater
- Nationality: Samoan; American
- Height: 6 ft 1 in (1.85 m)
- Weight: 265 lb (120 kg; 18.9 st)
- Division: Heavyweight
- Reach: 81 in (206 cm)
- Stance: Orthodox
- Fighting out of: San Francisco, California, United States
- Team: Skrap Pack; Empower Gym; El Nino Training Center
- Trainer: Gilbert Melendez
- Rank: Brown belt in Gracie Jiu-Jitsu
- Years active: 2007–present

Mixed martial arts record
- Total: 30
- Wins: 14
- By knockout: 11
- By submission: 1
- By decision: 2
- Losses: 15
- By knockout: 6
- By decision: 9
- No contests: 1

Other information
- Mixed martial arts record from Sherdog

Carl Seumanutafa (born June 15, 1983) is a Samoan mixed martial artist, wrestler and bare-knuckle boxer who competes in the Heavyweight division. A professional since 2007, he has competed for Bellator, Strikeforce, ShoXC, EliteXC, Tachi Palace Fights, King of the Cage, M-1 Global, and the PFL.

== Background ==
Born and raised in Samoa, Seumanutafa moved with his family to San Francisco at the age of 12, living in Bayview-Hunters Point. He attended J. Eugene McAteer High School where he competed in wrestling.

== Mixed martial arts career ==
=== Early career ===
Seumanutafa made his professional debut in March 2007, winning his first three bouts all via TKO before being signed by EliteXC.

=== EliteXC and Strikeforce ===
Seumanutafa made his promotional debut at EliteXC: Unfinished Business on July 26, 2008, against Mike Cook. Seumanutafa won via first-round knockout with a slam.

He returned two months later for the Elite Challenger series, facing Shane del Rosario. Seumanutafa was handed his first loss via TKO in the second round. In February 2009, Seumanutafa fought at M-1 Challenge 12: USA against Edson Franca. Seumanutafa lost via split decision after two rounds.

After the closing EliteXC and its absorption by Strikeforce, Semanutafa returned to the promotion three months later at the inaugural Strikeforce: Challengers event on May 15, 2009. Seumanutafa faced Lavar Johnson. During a takedown attempt, Seumanutafa was knocked out with an uppercut just 18 seconds into the first round.

=== Independent promotions ===
Seumanutafa snapped his three-fight losing streak with three straight TKO wins from 2010 to 2012. In October 2012, Seumanutafa faced Dave Huckaba and was knocked out in the first round.

He then fought Javy Ayala February 2013, winning via first-round TKO.

=== Bellator MMA ===
Semanutafa made his Bellator debut at Bellator 148 against Javy Ayala on January 29, 2016. Seumanutafa won again via ground and pound TKO, this time in the second round. Seumanutafa then faced Matt Mitrione at Bellator 157. Despite scoring an early knockdown, he was defeated via KO at 3:22 of the first round.

Seumanutafa returned to the Bellator cage in 2017 at Bellator 181, losing a unanimous decision to Valentin Moldavsky.

=== Professional Fighters League ===
After his loss to Moldavsky, Seumanutafa went 2-1 in independent promotions before signing with the Professional Fighters League.

Seumanutafa made his promotional debut on the preliminary card of PFL 3, facing Croatian Ante Delija. Seumanutafa was defeated via unanimous decision.

Seumanutafa then faced Ali Isaev at PFL 6 on August 8, 2019. He lost again via unanimous decision.

Seumanutafa, as a replacement for Stuart Austin, faced Renan Ferreira on June 25, 2021, at PFL 6. He lost the bout via unanimous decision.

Seumanutafa faced Muhammed DeReese on August 19, 2021, at PFL 8. He lost the bout via unanimous decision.

=== Gamebred FC ===
Seumanutafa faced Jamahl Tatum at Gamebred FC 4 in a bare-knuckle MMA bout on May 5, 2023, winning the bout via unanimous decision.

Seumanutafa faced Chase Sherman at Gamebred Bareknuckle MMA 6 on October 28, 2023. He lost the fight via knockout in the first round.

== Personal life ==
Seumanutafa is married and has two children; an eight-year old son named Tamatoa and seven-year old daughter; Eliza-Andra. Aside from fighting, Seumanutafa has worked as a personal trainer and is an assistant coach to NFL offseason player development for the Seattle Seahawks, Denver Broncos, Oakland Raiders, and his own favorite NFL team, the San Francisco 49ers.

== Mixed martial arts record ==
Professional record breakdown
30 matches	14 wins	15 losses
By knockout	11	6
By submission	1	0
By decision	2	9
No contests	1	

Res.	Record	Opponent	Method	Event	Date	Round	Time	Location	Notes
NC	14–15 (1)	Alex Nicholson	NC (overturned)	XFC: Detroit Grand Prix 2	May 31, 2024	1	4:09	Detroit, Michigan, United States	Originally a TKO (elbow and punches) win by Nicholson; overturned by the Michigan Unarmed Combat Commission.
Loss	14–15	Chase Sherman	KO (elbow and punches)	Gamebred Bareknuckle MMA 6	November 10, 2023	1	2:34	Biloxi, Mississippi, United States	Bare knuckle MMA.
Win	14–14	Derrick Williams	Submission (guillotine choke)	High Desert Brawl 16	September 9, 2023	1	0:37	Susanville, California, United States	
Win	13–14	Jamahl Tatum	Decision (unanimous)	Gamebred Bareknuckle MMA 4	May 5, 2023	3	5:00	Fort Lauderdale, Florida, United States	Bare Knuckle MMA.
Loss	12–14	Muhammed DeReese	Decision (unanimous)	PFL 8 (2021)	August 19, 2021	3	5:00	Hollywood, Florida, United States	
Loss	12–13	Renan Ferreira	Decision (unanimous)	PFL 6 (2021)	June 25, 2021	3	5:00	Atlantic City, New Jersey, United States	
Loss	12–12	Dustin Joynson	Decision (unanimous)	Cage Fury FC 87	October 30, 2020	3	5:00	Philadelphia, Pennsylvania, United States	
Loss	12–11	Ali Isaev	Decision (unanimous)	PFL 6 (2019)	August 8, 2019	3	5:00	Atlantic City, New Jersey, United States	
Loss	12–10	Ante Delija	Decision (unanimous)	PFL 3 (2019)	June 6, 2019	3	5:00	Uniondale, New York, United States	
Win	12–9	Nick Rossborough	TKO (injury)	Fierce FC: Fitcon Fights	April 12, 2019	2	0:47	Salt Lake City, Utah, United States	
Loss	11–9	Shelton Graves	Decision (unanimous)	Final Fight Championship 32	October 19, 2018	5	5:00	Las Vegas, Nevada, United States	For the vacant FFC Heavyweight Championship.
Win	11–8	Bill Widler	TKO (punches)	KOTC: No Escape	April 14, 2018	1	2:05	Oroville, California, United States	
Loss	10–8	Valentin Moldavsky	Decision (unanimous)	Bellator 181	June 14, 2017	3	5:00	Thackerville, Oklahoma, United States	
Loss	10–7	Matt Mitrione	KO (punch)	Bellator 157	June 24, 2016	1	3:22	St. Louis, Missouri, United States	
Win	10–6	Javy Ayala	TKO (punches)	Bellator 148	January 29, 2016	2	3:46	Fresno, California, United States	
Loss	9–6	DJ Linderman	Decision (unanimous)	KOTC: Total Elimination	October 3, 2015	3	5:00	Oroville, California, United States	
Win	9–5	Josh Appelt	Decision (unanimous)	West Coast FC 12	November 15, 2014	3	5:00	Sacramento, California, United States	
Loss	8–5	Jack May	TKO (head kick and punches)	TPF 18: Martinez vs. Culley	February 6, 2014	1	2:57	Lemoore, California, United States	
Win	8–4	Javy Ayala	TKO (punches)	Dragon House 13	February 2, 2013	1	3:00	Oakland, California, United States	
Loss	7–4	Dave Huckaba	KO (punch)	Cage Combat Fighting Championships	October 20, 2012	1	4:35	Santa Rosa, California, United States	
Win	7–3	Ruben Villareal	TKO (elbows)	Gladiator Challenge: World Class	June 23, 2012	3	2:57	Lincoln, California, United States	
Win	6–3	CJ Leveque	TKO (punches)	Impact MMA 1: Recognition	December 10, 2011	1	2:20	Pleasanton, California, United States	
Win	5–3	Derrick Williams	TKO (punches)	Global Knockout: Fall Brawl	September 18, 2010	3	1:05	Jackson, California, United States	
Loss	4–3	Lavar Johnson	KO (punch)	Strikforce Challengers: Evangelista vs. Aina	May 15, 2009	1	0:18	Fresno, California, United States	
Loss	4–2	Edson Franca	Decision (split)	M-1 Challenge 12: USA	February 21, 2009	2	5:00	Tacoma, Washington, United States	
Loss	4–1	Shane del Rosario	TKO (punches)	ShoXC: Elite Challenger Series	September 26, 2008	2	1:07	Santa Ynez, California, United States	
Win	4–0	Mike Cook	KO (slam)	EliteXC: Unfinished Business	July 26, 2008	1	1:21	Stockton, California, United States	
Win	3–0	Chris Bostick	TKO (punches)	Global Knockout 4	November 29, 2007	1	N/A	Jackson, California, United States	
Win	2–0	Pete Werve	TKO (punches)	Global Knockout 2	March 22, 2007	2	2:52	Jackson, California, United States	
Win	1–0	Chris Garrison	TKO (punches)	Global Knockout 2	March 22, 2007	1	0:32	Jackson, California, United States	
