= 2004 in WEC =

World Extreme Cagefighting events

Information
- First date: January 16, 2004
- Last date: October 21, 2004

Events
- Total events: 4

Fights
- Total fights: 53
- Title fights: 6

Chronology
2003 in WEC	2004 in WEC	2005 in WEC

The year 2004 was the 4th year in the history of World Extreme Cagefighting, a mixed martial arts promotion based in the United States. In 2004 WEC held 4 events beginning with, WEC 9: Cold Blooded.

== Title fights ==
Title fights in 2004
Weight class				Method	Round	Time	Event	Notes
Middleweight	Chris Leben	def.	Mike Swick	KO (Punch)	2	0:45	WEC 9: Cold Blooded	(Note: For the WEC Middleweight Championship.)
Welterweight	Karo Parisyan	def.	Shonie Carter (c)	Decision (Unanimous)	3	5:00	WEC 10: Bragging Rights	(Note: For the WEC Welterweight Championship.)
Lightweight	Gilbert Melendez	def.	Olaf Alfonso	TKO (Punches)	3	4:54	WEC 10: Bragging Rights	(Note: For the WEC Lightweight Championship.)
Heavyweight	James Irvin	def.	Jody Poff	TKO (Punches)	1	1:44	WEC 11: Evolution	(Note: For the WEC Heavyweight Championship.)
Lightweight	Gabe Ruediger	def.	Steve Ramirez	Submission (Triangle Choke)	1	1:24	WEC 11: Evolution	(Note: For the WEC Lightweight Championship.)
Heavyweight	James Irvin (c)	def.	Houssain Oushani	KO (Punch)	1	2:27	WEC 12: Halloween Fury 3	(Note: For the WEC Heavyweight Championship.)

== Events list ==
No.	Event	Date	Venue	Location	Attendance
12	WEC 12: Halloween Fury 3	October 21, 2004	Tachi Palace Hotel & Casino	Lemoore, California	
11	WEC 11: Evolution	August 20, 2004	Tachi Palace Hotel & Casino	Lemoore, California	
10	WEC 10: Bragging Rights	May 21, 2004	Tachi Palace Hotel & Casino	Lemoore, California	
9	WEC 9: Cold Blooded	January 16, 2004	Tachi Palace Hotel & Casino	Lemoore, California	

== WEC 9: Cold Blooded ==
WEC 9: Cold Blooded was an event held on January 16, 2004, at the Tachi Palace in Lemoore, California, United States.

=== Results ===
Main Card
Weight class				Method	Round	Time	Notes
	Mike Kyle	def.	Jude Hargett	TKO (Punches)	1	4:09
	Alex Stiebling	def.	Joe Riggs	Submission (Triangle Choke)	2	1:54
	Shonie Carter	def.	Gabe Garcia	TKO (Injury)	1	0:30
	Adrienna Jenkins	def.	Keri Scarr	DQ (Illegal Soccer Kick and Knee)	1	N/A
	Olaf Alfonso	def.	John Polakowski	Decision (Split)	3	5:00
	Yves Edwards	def.	Deshaun Johnson	Decision (Unanimous)	3	5:00
	Tiki Ghosn	def.	Nick Gilardi	Submission (Guillotine Choke)	1	4:52
	Doug Marshall	def.	Lavar Johnson	TKO (Corner Stoppage)	1	5:00
Middleweight	Chris Leben	def.	Mike Swick	KO (Punch)	2	0:45	(Note: For the WEC Middleweight Championship.)
	Poppies Martinez	def.	Eric Ramirez	TKO (Punches)	1	3:15
	Harris Sarmiento	def.	Rob McCullough	Decision (Split)	3	5:00
	Jack Cardenas	def.	John Appleby	TKO (Punches)	1	4:54
	Richard Montoya	def.	Joe Salcido	KO (Punch)	1	0:36
	Anthony Gonzales	def.	Pedro Tome	TKO (Punches)	1	2:14
	Josh Hayes	def.	Tony Asam	TKO (Punches)	1	2:05

== WEC 10: Bragging Rights ==
WEC 10: Bragging Rights was an event held on May 21, 2004, at the Tachi Palace in Lemoore, California, United States.

=== Results ===
Main Card
Weight class				Method	Round	Time	Notes
Heavyweight	Mike Serr	def.	Rafael Del Real	TKO (Submission to punches)	1	2:19	(Note: For the WEC Heavyweight Championship.)
Welterweight	Karo Parisyan	def.	Shonie Carter (c)	Decision (Unanimous)	3	5:00	(Note: For the WEC Welterweight Championship.)
Lightweight	Gilbert Melendez	def.	Olaf Alfonso	TKO (Punches)	3	4:54	(Note: For the WEC Lightweight Championship.)
	Alex Stiebling	def.	Tim McKenzie	Submission (Arm-Triangle Choke)	2	2:25
	Ryan Schultz	def.	Gil Castillo	Decision (Majority)	3	5:00
Lightweight	Poppies Martinez	def.	Gabriel Cruz Tenorio	TKO (Submission to punches)	1	0:30	(Note: For the WEC North American Lightweight Championship.)
	Bret Bergmark	def.	Daisuke Ishii	TKO (Punches)	1	4:49
Heavyweight	Doug Marshall	def.	Anthony Arria	Submission (Armbar)	1	0:22	(Note: For the WEC North American Heavyweight Championship.)
	Amir Rahnavardi	def.	Kengo Ura	TKO (Cut)	1	5:00
	Richard Montoya	def.	Bill Coffman	TKO (Punches)	1	0:47
	Lavar Johnson	def.	Levi Thornbrue	TKO (Punches)	1	2:32
	Steve Ramirez	def.	Chino Esparza	Submission (Rear-Naked Choke)	1	0:47

== WEC 11: Evolution ==
WEC 11: Evolution was an event held on August 20, 2004, at the Tachi Palace in Lemoore, California, United States.

=== Results ===
Main Card
Weight class				Method	Round	Time	Notes
	Shonie Carter	def.	Jason Biswell	TKO (Elbows)	1	3:13
Light Heavyweight	Richard Montoya	def.	Abraham Baxter	Decision (Unanimous)	3	5:00	(Note: For Vacant WEC Light Heavyweight Championship.)
	Lavar Johnson	def.	Fred Diaz	KO (Punches)	1	0:00
	Rafael del Real	def.	Michael MacDonald	TKO (Punches)	2	2:35
	Olaf Alfonso	def.	Philip Perez	TKO (Elbows)	1	2:57
	Carlos Garcia	def.	Seth Woodill	KO (Punch)	1	0:25
	Emanuel Newton	def.	Andre Mussi	Decision (Unanimous)	3	5:00
	Nick Ertl	def.	Nam Phan	Decision (Split)	3	5:00
Heavyweight	James Irvin	def.	Jody Poff	TKO (Punches)	1	1:44	(Note: For the WEC Heavyweight Championship.)
Lightweight	Gabe Ruediger	def.	Steve Ramirez	Submission (Triangle Choke)	1	1:24	(Note: For the WEC Lightweight Championship.)
	Josh Green	def.	Bill Coffman	Submission (Triangle Armbar)	1	1:19
	Brad Mohler	def.	Rob Clarke	TKO (Corner Stoppage)	3	3:59

== WEC 12: Halloween Fury 3 ==
WEC 12: Halloween Fury 3 was an event held on October 21, 2004, at the Tachi Palace in Lemoore, California, United States.

=== Results ===
Main Card
Weight class				Method	Round	Time	Notes
Heavyweight	Doug Marshall (c)	def.	Carlos Garcia	KO (Punches)	1	2:46	(Note: For the WEC North American Heavyweight Championship.)
	Shonie Carter	def.	Jody Poff	Submission (Rear-Naked Choke)	1	3:48
Light Heavyweight	Chael Sonnen	def.	Alex Stiebling	Decision (Unanimous)	3	5:00
Middleweight	Joe Riggs	def.	Isidro Gonzalez	TKO (Punches and Elbows)	1	1:50
Heavyweight	James Irvin	def.	Houssain Oushani	KO (Punch)	1	2:27	(Note: For the WEC Heavyweight Championship.)
	Poppies Martinez	def.	Joe Martin	TKO (Punches)	2	4:41
	Tosh Cook	def.	Rafael del Real	Submission (Triangle Choke)	1	1:34
Welterweight	Chris Lytle	def.	J.T. Taylor	Submission (Forearm Choke)	1	2:53
Lightweight	Gabe Ruediger	def.	Olaf Alfonso	Submission (Rear-Naked Choke)	1	3:05	(Note: For the WEC Lightweight Championship.)
Middleweight	Mark Weir	def.	Will Bradford	Submission (Guillotine Choke)	1	2:11	(Note: For the WEC North American Middleweight Championship.)
Heavyweight	Brad Imes	def.	Jeremy Freitag	Decision (Split)	3	5:00
Light Heavyweight	Troy Miller	def.	Tom Owens	TKO (Knee Injury)	2	3:56
Lightweight	Nate Diaz	def.	Alejandro Garcia	Submission (Triangle Choke)	3	2:17
Light Heavyweight	Jason Lambert	def.	Matt Horwich	TKO (Submission to punches)	2	3:28

== See also ==
- World Extreme Cagefighting
- List of World Extreme Cagefighting champions
- List of WEC events
