= WEC 12 =

WEC MMA events in 2004

WEC 12: Halloween Fury 3
- Promotion: World Extreme Cagefighting
- Date: October 21, 2004
- Venue: Tachi Palace Hotel & Casino
- City: Lemoore, California

Event chronology
WEC 11: Evolution	WEC 12: Halloween Fury 3	WEC 13: Heavyweight Explosion

WEC 12: Halloween Fury 3 was a mixed martial arts event promoted by World Extreme Cagefighting on October 21, 2004, at the Tachi Palace Hotel & Casino in Lemoore, California. The card featured many future superstars such as Jason "The Punisher" Lambert, Nate Diaz, Brad Imes, Chris "Lights Out" Lytle, "The Sandman" James Irvin, Joe "Diesel" Riggs, Chael Sonnen, and MMA legend "Mr. International" Shonie Carter. The main event saw Doug Marshall take on Carlos Garcia.

== Results ==
Main Card
Weight class				Method	Round	Time	Notes
	Doug Marshall	def.	Carlos Garcia	KO (Punches)	1	2:46
	Shonie Carter	def.	Jody Poff	Submission (Rear-Naked Choke)	1	3:48
	Chael Sonnen	def.	Alex Stiebling	Decision (Unanimous)	3	5:00
	Joe Riggs	def.	Isidro Gonzalez	TKO (Punches and Elbows)	1	1:50
Heavyweight	James Irvin (c)	def.	Houssain Oushani	KO (Punch)	1	2:27	(Note: For the WEC Heavyweight Championship.)
	Poppies Martinez	def.	Joe Martin	TKO (Punches)	2	4:41
	Tosh Cook	def.	Rafael del Real	Submission (Triangle Choke)	1	1:34
	Chris Lytle	def.	J.T. Taylor	Submission (Forearm Choke)	1	2:53
Lightweight	Gabe Ruediger	def.	Olaf Alfonso	Submission (Rear-Naked Choke)	1	3:05	(Note: For the WEC Lightweight Championship.)
	Mark Weir	def.	Will Bradford	Submission (Guillotine Choke)	1	2:11
	Brad Imes	def.	Jeremy Freitag	Decision (Split)	3	5:00
	Troy Miller	def.	Tom Owens	Submission (Knee Injury)	2	3:56
	Nate Diaz	def.	Alejandro Garcia	Submission (Triangle Choke)	3	2:17
	Jason Lambert	def.	Matt Horwich	Submission (Punches)	2	3:28

== See also ==
- World Extreme Cagefighting
- List of WEC champions
- List of WEC events
- 2004 in WEC
