= WEC 9 =

WEC MMA events in 2004

WEC 9: Cold Blooded
- Promotion: World Extreme Cagefighting
- Date: January 16, 2004
- Venue: Palace Indian Gaming Center
- City: Lemoore, California

Event chronology
WEC 8: Halloween Fury 2	WEC 9: Cold Blooded	WEC 10: Bragging Rights

WEC 9: Cold Blooded was a mixed martial arts event promoted by World Extreme Cagefighting on January 16, 2004, at the Palace Indian Gaming Center in Lemoore, California. The main event saw Mike Kyle take on Jude Hargett.

== Results ==
Main Card
Weight class				Method	Round	Time	Notes
	Mike Kyle	def.	Jude Hargett	TKO (Punches)	1	4:09
	Alex Stiebling	def.	Joe Riggs	Submission (Triangle Choke)	2	1:54
	Shonie Carter	def.	Gabe Garcia	TKO (Injury)	1	0:30
	Adrienna Jenkins	def.	Keri Scarr	DQ (Illegal Soccer Kick and Knee)	1	N/A
	Olaf Alfonso	def.	John Polakowski	Decision (Split)	3	5:00
	Yves Edwards	def.	Deshaun Johnson	Decision (Unanimous)	3	5:00
	Tiki Ghosn	def.	Nick Gilardi	Submission (Guillotine Choke)	1	4:52
	Doug Marshall	def.	Lavar Johnson	TKO (Corner Stoppage)	1	5:00
Middleweight	Chris Leben	def.	Mike Swick	KO (Punch)	2	0:45	(Note: For the WEC Middleweight Championship.)
	Poppies Martinez	def.	Eric Ramirez	TKO (Punches)	1	3:15
	Harris Sarmiento	def.	Rob McCullough	Decision (Split)	3	5:00
	Jack Cardenas	def.	John Appleby	TKO (Punches)	1	4:54
	Richard Montoya	def.	Joe Salcido	KO (Punch)	1	0:36
	Anthony Gonzales	def.	Pedro Tome	TKO (Punches)	1	2:14
	Josh Hayes	def.	Tony Asam	TKO (Punches)	1	2:05

== See also ==
- World Extreme Cagefighting
- List of WEC champions
- List of WEC events
- 2004 in WEC
