= Doug Marshall =

American mixed martial arts fighter

- Born: February 3, 1977 (age 49); Visalia, California, United States
- Other names: The Rhino
- Height: 5 ft 10 in (1.78 m)
- Weight: 185 lb (84 kg; 13.2 st)
- Division: Heavyweight; Light Heavyweight; Middleweight
- Reach: 69 in (175 cm)
- Stance: Orthodox
- Fighting out of: Visalia, California, United States
- Team: Elite Team Martial Arts; Visalia Fight Club
- Rank: Purple belt in Brazilian Jiu-Jitsu; Black belt in Muay Thai
- Years active: 2003-2014

Mixed martial arts record
- Total: 26
- Wins: 18
- By knockout: 13
- By submission: 3
- By decision: 2
- Losses: 8
- By knockout: 7
- By submission: 1

Other information
- Mixed martial arts record from Sherdog

Douglas Garrett Marshall (born February 3, 1977) is an American former professional mixed martial artist. A professional competitor from 2003 until 2014, Marshall has fought in Bellator, Tachi Palace Fights, the Super Fight League, and the Palace Fighting Championship, and the WEC, where he was the Light Heavyweight Champion. 19 of his 26 career bouts have ended via KO.

== Background ==
Born and raised in Visalia, California, Marshall was a star linebacker for his high school football team but was expelled for fighting.

== Mixed martial arts career ==
=== Independent promotions ===
When TPF Middleweight Champion David Loiseau pulled out of a TPF 10 fight with Giva Santana due to an undisclosed injury requiring surgery, Marshall stepped in to face Santana in a middleweight non-title bout. He lost via technical submission in the first round.

He next competed on India's Super Fight League's third event, SFL 3, against Zelg Galešić. He lost the fight via KO early in the first round from a flying knee and punches.

=== Bellator MMA ===
In November 2012, Marshall made his debut for Bellator. He faced Hawaiian fighter Kala Hose at Bellator 82. He won the fight via knockout at just 22 seconds in the first round.

In January 2013, Bellator announced Marshall as a competitor in the Season Eight Middleweight Tournament. His quarterfinal fight took place at Bellator 89 against Andreas Spang. He won the fight via TKO in the first round. Marshall then faced Sultan Aliev in the semifinals at Bellator 92, He won via split decision.

Having earned his title shot, Marshall faced Alexander Shlemenko on November 22, 2013 at Bellator 109 for the Bellator Middleweight Championship. He lost the fight via KO due to a body shot in the first round. Following the fight, Marshall tested positive for a banned substance and was subsequently fined and banned by the Pennsylvania Athletic Commission until February 7, 2014.

Marshall faced Melvin Manhoef on September 19, 2014 at Bellator 125.

== Personal life ==
Marshall has a son.

== Championships and accomplishments ==
- Bellator Fighting Championships
  - Bellator Season Eight Middleweight Tournament Winner
- World Extreme Cagefighting
  - WEC Light Heavyweight Championship (One time)
    - Two successful title defenses

== Mixed martial arts record ==
Professional record breakdown
26 matches	18 wins	8 losses
By knockout	13	7
By submission	3	1
By decision	2	0

Res.	Record	Opponent	Method	Event	Date	Round	Time	Location	Notes
Loss	18–8	Melvin Manhoef	KO (punch)	Bellator 125	September 19, 2014	1	1:45	Fresno, California, United States	
Loss	18–7	Alexander Shlemenko	TKO (punch to the body)	Bellator 109	November 22, 2013	1	4:28	Bethlehem, Pennsylvania, United States	For the Bellator Middleweight Championship. Tested positive for banned substance post-fight.
Win	18–6	Brett Cooper	KO (punches)	Bellator 95	April 4, 2013	1	3:39	Atlantic City, New Jersey, United States	Bellator Season Eight Middleweight Tournament Final.
Win	17–6	Sultan Aliev	Decision (split)	Bellator 92	March 7, 2013	3	5:00	Temecula, California, United States	Bellator Season Eight Middleweight Tournament Semifinal.
Win	16–6	Andreas Spång	TKO (punch)	Bellator 89	February 14, 2013	1	3:03	Charlotte, North Carolina, United States	Bellator Season Eight Middleweight Tournament Quarterfinal.
Win	15–6	Kala Hose	KO (punch)	Bellator 82	November 30, 2012	1	0:22	Mt. Pleasant, Michigan, United States	
Loss	14–6	Zelg Galesic	KO (flying knee)	SFL 3	May 6, 2012	1	0:34	New Delhi, Delhi, India	
Win	14–5	Richard Blake	KO (punch)	Twilight Fight Night: Numero Uno	September 10, 2011	1	0:21	Woodlake, California, United States	
Loss	13–5	Givanildo Santana	Technical Submission (rear-naked choke)	TPF 10: Let The Chips Fall	August 5, 2011	1	0:29	Lemoore, California, United States	
Loss	13–4	Kyacey Uscola	KO (punches)	TPF 6: High Stakes	September 13, 2010	1	3:17	Lemoore, California, United States	
Win	13–3	B.J. Lacy	Submission (rear-naked choke)	Playboy Fight Night	March 6, 2010	3	1:35	Visalia, California, United States	
Win	12–3	Keith Berry	KO (punches)	PURECOMBAT: Fearless	October 17, 2009	1	4:41	Tulare, California, United States	
Win	11–3	Jaime Jara	Decision (split)	PFC 13: Validation	May 8, 2009	3	3:00	Lemoore, California, United States	
Win	10–3	Rafael Real	TKO (punches)	PFC 11: All In	November 20, 2008	1	1:09	Lemoore, California, United States	Middleweight debut.
Win	9–3	Phil Collins	TKO (punches)	PFC 9: The Return	July 18, 2008	2	0:40	Lemoore, California, United States	
Loss	8–3	Brian Stann	TKO (punches)	WEC 33: Marshall vs. Stann	March 26, 2008	1	1:35	Las Vegas, Nevada, United States	Lost the WEC Light Heavyweight Championship.
Win	8–2	Ariel Gandulla	Submission (armbar)	WEC 31	December 12, 2007	1	0:55	Las Vegas, Nevada, United States	Defended the WEC Light Heavyweight Championship. Broke the record for the most consecutive WEC Light Heavyweight Championship title defenses (2).
Win	7–2	Justin McElfresh	KO (punch)	WEC 27	May 12, 2007	1	2:16	Las Vegas, Nevada, United States	Defended the WEC Light Heavyweight Championship.
Win	6–2	Lodune Sincaid	TKO (punches)	WEC 23	August 17, 2006	2	0:51	Lemoore, California, United States	Won the WEC Light Heavyweight Championship.
Win	5–2	Jeff Terry	TKO (punches)	WEC 22	July 28, 2006	1	1:50	Lemoore, California, United States	
Loss	4–2	Tim McKenzie	TKO (punches and elbows)	WEC 19: Undisputed	March 17, 2006	1	3:35	Lemoore, California, United States	Light Heavyweight debut. Weighed in at 195 lbs.
Loss	4–1	James Irvin	KO (knee)	WEC 15	May 19, 2005	2	0:45	Lemoore, California, United States	For the WEC Heavyweight Championship.
Win	4–0	Carlos Garcia	KO (punches)	WEC 12	October 21, 2004	1	2:46	Lemoore, California, United States	
Win	3–0	Anthony Arria	Submission (armbar)	WEC 10	May 21, 2004	1	0:22	Lemoore, California, United States	
Win	2–0	Lavar Johnson	TKO (corner stoppage)	WEC 9	January 16, 2004	1	5:00	Lemoore, California, United States	
Win	1–0	Anthony Fuller	TKO (submission to punches)	WEC 8	October 17, 2003	1	0:32	Lemoore, California, United States	

== See also ==
- List of Bellator MMA alumni

Preceded by Lodune Sincaid	5th WEC Light Heavyweight Champion; August 17, 2006 - March 26, 2008	Succeeded by Brian Stann
