= WEC 11 =

WEC MMA events in 2004

WEC 11: Evolution
- Promotion: World Extreme Cagefighting
- Date: August 20, 2004
- Venue: Tachi Palace Hotel & Casino
- City: Lemoore, California

Event chronology
WEC 10: Bragging Rights	WEC 11: Evolution	WEC 12: Halloween Fury 3

WEC 11: Evolution was a mixed martial arts event promoted by World Extreme Cagefighting on August 20, 2004, at the Tachi Palace Hotel & Casino in Lemoore, California. The main event saw Shonie Carter take on Jason Biswell.

== Results ==
Main Card
Weight class				Method	Round	Time	Notes
	Shonie Carter	def.	Jason Biswell	TKO (Elbows)	1	3:13
	Richard Montoya	def.	Abraham Baxter	Decision (Unanimous)	3	5:00
	Lavar Johnson	def.	Fred Diaz	KO (Punches)	1	1:33
	Rafael del Real	def.	Michael MacDonald	TKO (Punches)	2	2:35
	Olaf Alfonso	def.	Philip Perez	TKO (Elbows)	1	2:57
	Carlos Garcia	def.	Seth Woodill	KO (Punch)	1	0:25
	Emanuel Newton	def.	Andre Mussi	Decision (Unanimous)	3	5:00
	Nick Ertl	def.	Nam Phan	Decision (Split)	3	5:00
Heavyweight	James Irvin	def.	Jody Poff	TKO (Punches)	1	1:44
Lightweight	Gabe Ruediger	def.	Steve Ramirez	Submission (Triangle Choke)	1	1:24
	Josh Green	def.	Bill Coffman	Submission (Triangle Armbar)	1	1:19
	Brad Mohler	def.	Rob Clarke	TKO (Corner Stoppage)	3	3:59

== See also ==
- World Extreme Cagefighting
- List of WEC champions
- List of WEC events
- 2004 in WEC
