= WEC 23 =

WEC MMA events in 2006

WEC 23: Hot August Fights
- Promotion: World Extreme Cagefighting
- Date: August 17, 2006
- Venue: Tachi Palace Hotel & Casino
- City: Lemoore, California

Event chronology
WEC 22: The Hitman	WEC 23: Hot August Fights	WEC 24: Full Force

WEC 23: Hot August Fights was a mixed martial arts event held on August 17, 2006. WEC 23's main event was a championship fight for the WEC Light Heavyweight Title between champion Lodune Sincaid and challenger Doug Marshall.

== Results ==
Main Card
Weight class				Method	Round	Time	Notes
Light Heavyweight	Doug Marshall	def.	Lodune Sincaid (c)	TKO (Punches)	2	0:51	(Note: For the WEC Light Heavyweight Championship.)
Featherweight	Antonio Banuelos	def.	Cole Escovedo	Decision (Unanimous)	3	5:00
Welterweight	John Alessio	def.	Alex Serdyukov	Submission (Rear-Naked Choke)	3	1:52
Welterweight	Alex Karalexis	def.	Thomas Denny	Decision (Unanimous)	3	5:00
Lightweight	Poppies Martinez	def.	Gigo Jara	Submission (Rear-Naked Choke)	2	3:52
Middleweight	Kenny Ento	def.	Mario Rivera	Submission (Armbar)	1	2:44
Lightweight	Casey Olson	def.	Chris Solomon	Decision (Unanimous)	3	5:00
Middleweight	Fernando Gonzalez	def.	Alex Stiebling	TKO (Doctor Stoppage)	1	2:35
Light Heavyweight	Anthony Ruiz	def.	Jeremy Freitag	TKO (Punches)	2	2:46
Lightweight	Clay Guida	def.	Joe Martin	Decision (Unanimous)	3	5:00
Light Heavyweight	Dan Molina	def.	Rafael del Real	Submission (Heel Hook)	1	0:43
Welterweight	Josh McDonald	def.	Patrick Murphy	Decision (Majority)	3	5:00
Lightweight	Robert Breslin	vs.	Andrew Martinez	Draw	2	5:00

== See also ==
- World Extreme Cagefighting
- List of World Extreme Cagefighting champions
- List of WEC events
- 2006 in WEC
