= Shonie Carter =

American mixed martial arts fighter

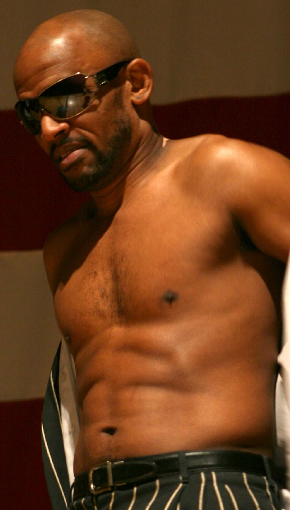
- Born: May 3, 1972 (age 54); Chicago, Illinois, United States
- Other names: Mr. International
- Height: 5 ft 9 in (1.75 m)
- Weight: 176 lb (80 kg; 12 st 8 lb)
- Division: Welterweight; Middleweight; Light Heavyweight
- Stance: Southpaw
- Fighting out of: Chicago, Illinois, United States
- Team: Iron Academy
- Rank: Black belt in Judo; Black belt in Jujutsu; Black belt in Shidokan Karate
- Years active: 1997–2017

Kickboxing record
- Total: 62
- Wins: 57
- Losses: 5
- Draws: 0

Mixed martial arts record
- Total: 91
- Wins: 51
- By knockout: 12
- By submission: 15
- By decision: 24
- Losses: 32
- By knockout: 11
- By submission: 3
- By decision: 18
- Draws: 7
- No contests: 1

Other information
- University: Triton Community College; Carson–Newman College
- Website: www.shoniecarter.com
- Mixed martial arts record from Sherdog

Shonie Carter (born May 3, 1972), is an American former mixed martial artist. He is a former WEC Welterweight Champion, a UFC veteran, and a contestant on The Ultimate Fighter 4 reality show. He has also competed in Pancrase, Shooto, King of the Cage, M-1 Global, KSW, and Bellator. He is known for his flashy dress, colorful vocabulary, outlandish personality and use of the spinning backfist in competition.

== Early life and martial arts background ==
Carter was born in Chicago, Illinois and served for six years in the United States Marine Corps before beginning his profession as a fighter. Carter attended Proviso East High School. He began his martial arts training in Wrestling at Triton College in River Grove, Illinois before transferring to Carson-Newman College in Tennessee where he began studying Judo and Jujutsu, under Dr. Stephen Terrell and Dr. Stephen Karr. He was also an All-American Wrestler and participated in the Olympic trials. After a semester of studying Judo, Carter enrolled in the Tennessee state championship in the White, Green, Brown, and Black Belt divisions. He won state titles in the White-Green and Brown divisions, and placed second in the Black Belt division. His instructor awarded him his Brown Belt after his performance. Carter later added Boxing, Kung Fu and Karate to his repertoire.

In addition to his MMA career, he also holds a record of 57 wins and five losses as a professional kickboxer.

== Career ==
Carter has fought in a wide variety of shows, both large and small. He has won at least ten belts in various organizations throughout his career. He began his career in 1997, fighting primarily in the Extreme Challenge promotion. Though he lost his debut fight to LaVerne Clark by knockout in just 9 seconds, he went on to rack up an 11-1-2 record before facing UFC welterweight champion Pat Miletich. He lost via a decision.

Carter began to make appearances in Pancrase and won his UFC debut at UFC 24 against Brad Gumm. He went on to win notable victories over Chris Lytle and Matt Serra. In 2003, he appeared in fledgling promotion World Extreme Cagefighting and became the WEC Welterweight Champion after defeating JT Taylor. He would lose his first title defense to Karo Parisyan. Other notable fights included a loss to future UFC title contender Jon Fitch, a victory over future UFC fighter Jess Liaudin, and a victory over Jason Black, who was undefeated in 22 fights prior to the bout.

=== The Ultimate Fighter 4 ===
After losing to Nathan Quarry at UFC 53 by TKO, Carter's UFC record stood at a lukewarm 3–2. He applied as a contestant for the fourth season of The Ultimate Fighter a reality show on Spike. The season, subtitled "The Comeback", featured MMA veterans whose careers in the UFC could use a jumpstart. Carter joined Team Mojo and was picked to fight first against Team No Love's Rich Clementi. Carter arrived to the show out of shape and struggled through his initial workout. With help from his cornerman Matt Serra, however, Carter won a two-round decision over Clementi. In the second round, Carter fought a rematch with Matt Serra. Much was made of Carter's come-from-behind KO by spinning backfist in their previous encounter. Though Carter landed another spinning backfist, he lost the fight by decision.

Throughout the show, Carter earned notoriety and sparked irritation from his cast-mates with his habits, including his unusual style of dress and various artistic projects. He angered both teams by unilaterally deciding to train with Team No Love for a day. He also asked Clementi to corner him in his fight with Serra. On the show, his MMA record showed that he had 198 professional fights.

=== Post-show career ===
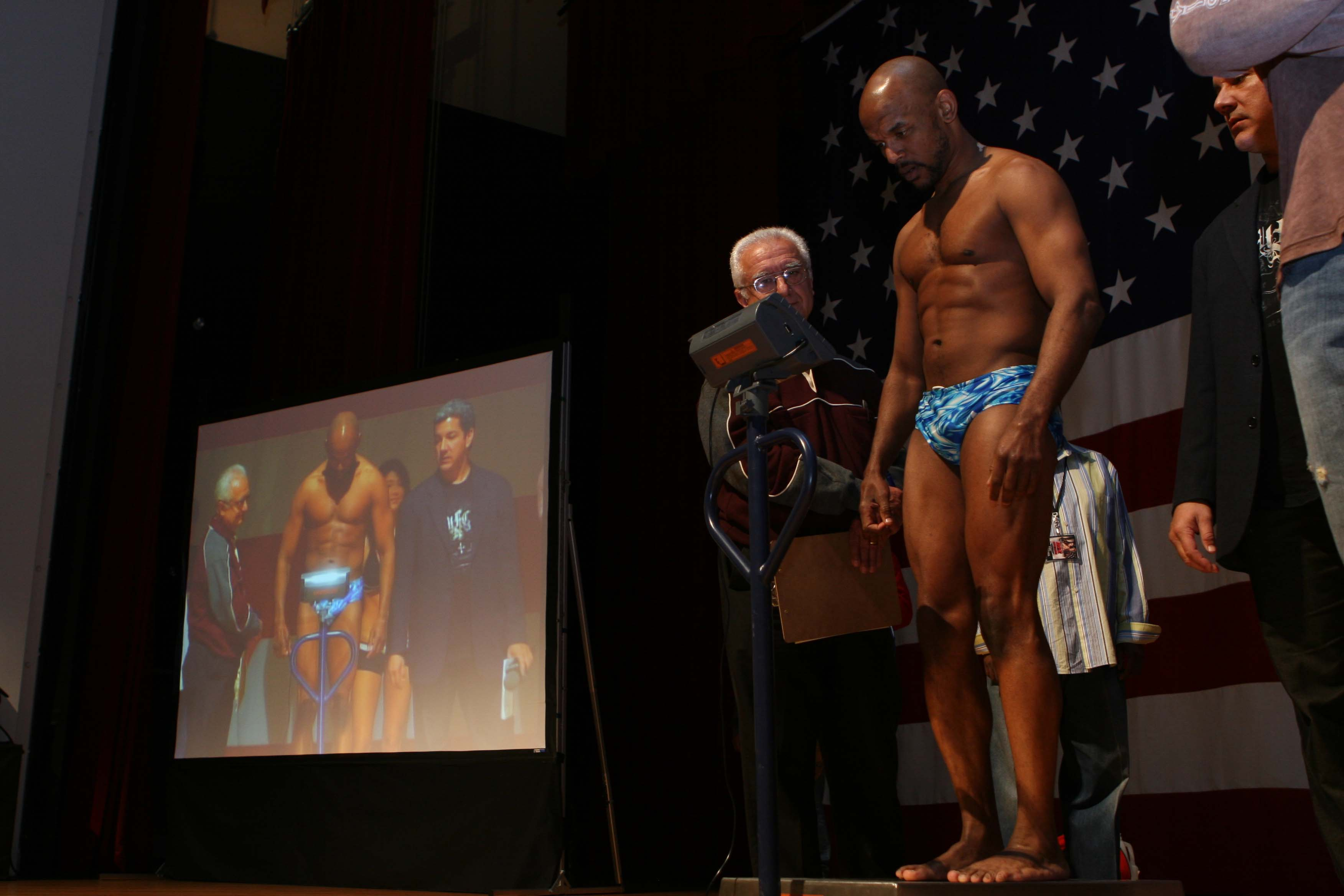
Carter weighing in at UFC Fight Night: Sanchez vs Riggs.

After the completion of the show, Carter did not appear on the card of the season finale. He did, however, make an appearance a month later at UFC Fight Night: Sanchez vs. Riggs, losing to Marcus Davis by unanimous decision. Afterward, Carter continued to fight in smaller promotions. He won the Throwdown Middleweight Championship at Throwdown ETC – Showdown on February 20, 2009, via a split decision victory from George Lockhart. He lost 7 out of his last 9 fights.

Carter announced his first retirement in January 2013, with around 240 full contact karate, kickboxing and MMA bouts under his belt.

Carter came out of retirement in January 2014, when he faced Matt Dwyer for the BFL Welterweight Championship. Carter lost the fight by TKO (retirement). Carter was among the fighters coached by Brian Gassaway, a UFC, WEC and Bellator veteran who worked as a trainer in Chicago after retiring from competition in 2010.

== Other activities ==
After finishing his stint on The Ultimate Fighter, Carter appeared on BET's similar program The Iron Ring as a coach for Lil Jon's team, Headbusters. While taping, Carter verbally sparred with Floyd Mayweather, the leader of another team, over a fight stoppage. Mayweather was condescending toward the sport of mixed martial arts throughout the show. Carter claims that he has gained more notoriety from members of the black community since his appearance on The Iron Ring than from his UFC and The Ultimate Fighter appearances.

On May 16, 2008, Carter served as an impromptu guest referee for a notorious bout at a Legends of Fighting event that resulted in a double-knockout. Eight seconds into the bout, newcomers Tyler Bryan and Shaun Parker landed simultaneous knockout punches. The video of the double-knockout, and Carter's subsequent reaction, has been viewed on YouTube over 1 million times. He spoke with C.M. Punk on making the jump to the professional wrestling ring.

== Bare-knuckle boxing ==
On April 22, 2017, Carter took part in a "bare knuckle" (in actuality fighters hands were wrapped) boxing event for Bare Knuckle Boxing in England at BKB 4. He faced undefeated Jimmy "Celtic Warrior" Sweeney, BKB's most popular and recognized fighter, in a Middleweight title fight. Carter lost a spirited bout by decision after five rounds, but took Sweeney the distance, the first fighter in BKB history to do so. Shonie had his training camp for this bout with Lytes Out Podcast host Mike Davis.

== Personal life ==
Carter is currently single and has three children. He resides in Chicago teaching at the Honbu Dojo Shidokan USA under the guidance of USA Shidokan Branch Chief Eddie Yoshimura. He is a bartender and bouncer at the Mexican restaurant Fiesta Cantina in the Wrigleyville neighborhood of Chicago, Illinois and a personal trainer at XSport.

== Championships and accomplishments ==
=== Mixed martial arts ===
- Ultimate Fighting Championship
  - UFC Encyclopedia Awards
    - Knockout of the Night (One time) vs. Matt Serra

=== Amateur wrestling ===
- National Junior College Athletic Association
  - NJCAA All-American
  - Collegiate World Team member

=== Judo ===
- Tennessee State Judo Championships
  - Tennessee Middleweight Judo Championship (Two times)

=== Karate ===
- Ireland Super Cup
  - Ireland Super Cup Welterweight Championship
- Shidōkan German Cup
  - Shidōkan German Cup Championship
- Shidōkan Mixed Fighting
  - SMF Welterweight Championship
- Shidōkan Superfight
  - Shidōkan Superfight Middleweight Championship
- United States Shidōkan Championships
  - USSC Lightweight Championship
  - USSC Middleweight Championship
  - USSC Light Middleweight Championship

=== Kickboxing ===
- Illinois State Kickboxing
  - Illinois Light Heavyweight Championship
- North Carolina State Kickboxing
  - North Carolina Middleweight Championship

=== Mixed martial arts ===
- Extreme Challenge
  - EC Lightweight Championship
  - EC Lightweight Tournament Championship
- Indiana Martial Arts Challenge
  - IMAC Welterweight Championship
- International Fighting Championship
  - IFC Welterweight Superfight Championship
- Iron Heart Crown
  - IHC Shooto North American Welterweight Championship
- King of the Cage
  - KOTC Welterweight Superfight Championship
- Throwdown
  - Throwdown Middleweight Championship
- World Extreme Cagefighting
  - WEC Welterweight Championship
- World Fighting Council
  - WFC Middleweight Championship

=== Submission grappling ===
- North American Grappling Association
  - NAGA Midwest Super Heavyweight Championship
- United States Pankration Championship
  - United States Pankration Championship

=== Other ===
- Awards and accomplishments
  - U.S.A. Martial Arts Hall of Fame Induction (2008)
  - Lifetime Achievement Award, Combat Radio Broadcasting (2009)
  - Action Martial Arts Hall of Fame Induction (2010)
  - Master's Hall of Fame Induction (2011)

== Kickboxing record ==
Kickboxing record
57 wins (? KOs), 5 losses, 0 draws
Date	Result	Opponent	Event	Location	Method	Round	Time
2001-12-15	Loss	(United States) Cung Le	Strikeforce	San Jose, California, USA	Decision (unanimous)	5	3:00
For the IKF World Light Heavyweight (-81.3 kg/179 lb) Sanshou Championship.
Legend: Win Loss Draw/No contest Notes

== Mixed martial arts record ==
Professional record breakdown
91 matches	51 wins	32 losses
By knockout	12	11
By submission	15	3
By decision	24	18
Draws	7	
No contests	1	

Res.	Record	Opponent	Method	Event	Date	Round	Time	Location	Notes
Loss	51–32–7 (1)	Joe Riggs	TKO (punches)	ZPromotions: Fight Night Medicine Hat 4	September 9, 2017	2	4:54	Medicine Hat, Alberta, Canada	For the vacant Fight Night Light Heavyweight Championship.
Loss	51–31–7 (1)	Johnny Parsons	KO (punches)	Golden Fights: Cage Wars 22	July 25, 2015	1	0:34	Grand Junction, Colorado, United States	
Win	51–30–7 (1)	Shannon Ritch	TKO (injury)	Super Brawl Showdown 1	January 30, 2015	1	5:00	Phoenix, Arizona, United States	
Loss	50–30–7 (1)	Matt Dwyer	TKO (retirement)	Battlefield Fight League 27	January 18, 2014	3	5:00	Richmond, British Columbia, Canada	For the BFL Welterweight Championship.
Loss	50–29–7 (1)	Josh Bryant	TKO (punches)	KOTC: Heavy Duty	September 21, 2012	2	2:15	Tulsa, Oklahoma, United States	
Loss	50–28–7 (1)	Brandon Halsey	Decision (unanimous)	KOTC: Reckless Abandon	February 2, 2012	3	5:00	Highland, California, United States	
Win	50–27–7 (1)	Landon Showalter	Decision (unanimous)	Rumble on the Ridge 20	October 15, 2011	3	5:00	Snoqualmie, Washington, United States	
Loss	49–27–7 (1)	Rumen Dimitrov	TKO (punches)	BMMAF: Warriors 19	March 10, 2011	2	2:48	Sofia, Bulgaria	
Loss	49–26–7 (1)	Jeremy Knafo	Decision (unanimous)	Israel FC: Genesis	November 9, 2010	3	5:00	Tel Aviv, Israel	
Loss	49–25–7 (1)	Torrance Taylor	Decision (unanimous)	Bellator 25	August 19, 2010	3	5:00	Chicago, Illinois, United States	
Loss	49–24–7 (1)	Rick Hawn	TKO (head kick and punches)	Triumph Fighter 3: Havoc	July 31, 2010	2	4:08	Milford, New Hampshire United States	
Loss	49–23–7 (1)	Dylan Andrews	Decision (unanimous)	Cage Fighting Championship 13	April 17, 2010	3	5:00	Gold Coast, Queensland, Australia	
Loss	49–22–7 (1)	Nabil Khatib	Decision (split)	W-1 MMA 4: Bad Blood	March 20, 2010	3	5:00	Montreal, Quebec, Canada	
Win	49–21–7 (1)	Derek Smith	Submission (front choke)	CFX: Cage Fighting Xtreme	February 13, 2010	1	2:32	St. Cloud, Minnesota, United States	
Loss	48–21–7 (1)	Anthony Macias	Decision (unanimous)	Freestyle Cage Fighting 37	November 7, 2009	3	5:00	Tulsa, Oklahoma, United States	
Loss	48–20–7 (1)	Carlos Newton	Decision (unanimous)	W-1 MMA 4: High Voltage	October 10, 2009	3	5:00	Gatineau, Quebec, Canada	Originally for the W-1 Welterweight Championship; however Newton failed to make weight and the bout was made a non-title fight.
Win	48–19–7 (1)	Danny Abbadi	KO (punches)	Respect in the Cage 1: Expo & Fight	September 20, 2009	1	4:23	Pico Rivera, California, United States	
Loss	47–19–7 (1)	Derrick Noble	Decision (unanimous)	VFC: A Night of Vengeance	September 5, 2009	3	5:00	Oranjestad, Aruba	
Win	47–18–7 (1)	George Lockhart	Decision (split)	Throwdown ETC: Showdown	February 20, 2009	3	5:00	Salt Lake City, Utah, United States	
Win	46–18–7 (1)	Ryan Scheeper	Submission (kimura)	ISCF: Bad Intentions	December 12, 2008	1	2:08	Wisconsin Dells, Wisconsin, United States	
Win	45–18–7 (1)	Allan Hope	Submission (armbar)	CCF 3: Undisputed	November 28, 2008	1	2:32	Edmonton, Alberta, Canada	
Loss	44–18–7 (1)	Matt Major	Decision (unanimous)	CCFC: Rumble in the Park	August 23, 2008	3	5:00	Fresno, California, United States	
Win	44–17–7 (1)	Demi Deeds	TKO	PFC: Primetime Fighting Championships	May 30, 2008	2	2:41	Indiana, United States	
Win	43–17–7 (1)	John Cronk	Decision (unanimous)	WFC: Armageddon	April 12, 2008	3	5:00	Denver, Colorado, United States	
Loss	42–17–7 (1)	Brad Zazulak	TKO (injury)	MFC 14: High Rollers	November 23, 2007	1	2:09	Enoch, Alberta, Canada	
Win	42–16–7 (1)	Chris Powers	Decision (unanimous)	ISCF: Fight 2 the Finish	November 9, 2007	3	5:00	Chicago, Illinois, United States	
Win	41–16–7 (1)	Joshua Taibl	TKO (submission to strikes)	EC 83: Extreme Challenge 83	September 1, 2007	2	3:20	Riverside, Iowa, United States	
Win	40–16–7 (1)	Kris Fleurstil	TKO (punches)	XFO 18: Xtreme Fighting	June 30, 2007	1	4:05	Wisconsin Dells, Wisconsin, United States	
Loss	39–16–7 (1)	Marcus Davis	Decision (unanimous)	UFC Fight Night: Sanchez vs. Riggs	December 13, 2006	3	5:00	San Diego, California, United States	
Win	39–15–7 (1)	Alex Carter	Submission (rear-naked choke)	IFC: Rumble on the River	March 11, 2006	1	3:21	Kearney, Nebraska, United States	
Win	38–15–7 (1)	Jason Black	TKO (arm injury)	KOTC: Redemption on the River	February 17, 2006	1	1:18	Moline, Illinois, United States	
Loss	37–15–7 (1)	Mike Pyle	Submission (triangle choke)	WEC 18: Unfinished Business	January 13, 2006	1	2:06	Lemoore, California, United States	For the WEC Welterweight Championship.
Loss	37–14–7 (1)	Jonathan Goulet	Submission (bulldog choke)	TKO 23: Extreme	November 5, 2005	1	3:05	Victoriaville, Quebec, Canada	
Win	37–13–7 (1)	Marcin Zontek	Decision (unanimous)	KSW IV: Konfrontacja	September 10, 2005	2	5:00	Warsaw, Poland	
Win	36–13–7 (1)	Josh Haynes	Decision (unanimous)	IFC: Rock N' Rumble	July 30, 2005	3	5:00	Reno, Nevada, United States	
Win	35–13–7 (1)	Jason MacDonald	Decision (unanimous)	TKO 21: Collision	July 15, 2005	3	5:00	Montreal, Quebec, Canada	
Loss	34–13–7 (1)	Nate Quarry	TKO (punches)	UFC 53: Heavy Hitters	June 4, 2005	1	2:37	Atlantic City, New Jersey, United States	
Loss	34–12–7 (1)	Jorge Oliveira	Decision (unanimous)	WEC 13: Heavyweight Explosion	January 22, 2005	3	5:00	Lemoore, California, United States	
NC	34–11–7 (1)	Buddy Clinton	No Contest (confusion over fight length)	KOTC 45: King of the Cage 45	November 20, 2004	2	5:00	Indiana, United States	
Win	34–11–7	John Cronk	TKO (doctor stoppage)	KOTC 44: Revenge	November 14, 2004	1	5:00	San Jacinto, California, United States	
Win	33–11–7	Jody Poff	Submission (rear-naked choke)	WEC 12	October 21, 2004	1	3:48	Lemoore, California, United States	
Loss	32–11–7	Azred Telkusheev	Decision (unanimous)	M-1 MFC: Middleweight GP	October 9, 2004	2	5:00	St. Petersburg, Russia	
Win	32–10–7	Jason Biswell	TKO (elbows)	WEC 11	August 20, 2004	1	3:13	Lemoore, California, United States	
Win	31–10–7	Jess Liaudin	Decision	CW: Cage Wars	May 30, 2004	3	5:00	Belfast, Northern Ireland	
Loss	30–10–7	Karo Parisyan	Decision (unanimous)	WEC 10	May 21, 2004	3	5:00	Lemoore, California, United States	Lost the WEC Welterweight Championship.
Win	30–9–7	Gabe Garcia	TKO (injury)	WEC 9	January 16, 2004	1	0:30	Lemoore, California, United States	
Loss	29–9–7	Jon Fitch	TKO (submission to slam)	Shooto USA: Warrior Spirit Evolution	November 14, 2003	3	0:41	Las Vegas, Nevada, United States	175 lbs bout.
Win	29–8–7	JT Taylor	Decision (unanimous)	WEC 8: Halloween Fury 2	October 17, 2003	3	5:00	Lemoore, California, United States	Won the vacant WEC Welterweight Championship.
Win	28–8–7	Dax Bruce	Submission (rear-naked choke)	WEC 7: This Time It's Personal	August 9, 2003	1	2:28	Lemoore, California, United States	
Draw	27–8–7	Kousei Kubota	Draw	Shidokan: New Combat Festival	July 13, 2003	2	5:00	Tokyo, Japan	
Loss	27–8–6	Ronald Jhun	Decision (unanimous)	KOTC 23: Sin City	May 16, 2003	5	5:00	Las Vegas, Nevada, United States	For the vacant KOTC Welterweight Championship.
Win	27–7–6	Peter Angerer	Decision	Shido: Fists of Fury 2	April 12, 2003	3	5:00	Germany	
Loss	26–7–6	Jeremy Jackson	Decision (unanimous)	WEC 6: Return of a Legend	March 27, 2003	3	5:00	Lemoore, California, United States	
Win	26–6–6	Seichi Ikemoto	Decision (unanimous)	Shooto: 3/18 in Korakuen Hall	March 18, 2003	3	5:00	Tokyo, Japan	
Win	25–6–6	Fernando Vasconcelos	TKO (corner stoppage)	KOTC 21: Invasion	February 21, 2003	2	5:00	Albuquerque, New Mexico, United States	
Win	24–6–6	Mike Nomikos	Submission (neck crank)	Shidokan: World Open 2002	December 5, 2002	2	N/A	Chicago, Illinois, United States	
Draw	23–6–6	Ronald Jhun	Draw	SB 27: SuperBrawl 27	November 9, 2002	3	5:00	Honolulu, Hawaii, United States	
Win	23–6–5	Jay Buck	Decision (split)	IHC 5: Tribulation	October 26, 2002	3	5:00	Hammond, Indiana, United States	
Win	22–6–5	Randy Velarde	Submission (rear-naked choke)	KOTC 16: Double Cross	August 2, 2002	1	4:53	San Jacinto, California, United States	
Win	21–6–5	Kolo Koka	Decision (unanimous)	SB 25: SuperBrawl 25	July 13, 2002	3	5:00	Honolulu, Hawaii, United States	
Win	20–6–5	Armin Eslami	Decision	Shido: Fists of Fury 1	April 13, 2002	3	5:00	Mossingen, Germany	
Loss	19–6–5	Pat Miletich	KO (head kick)	UFC 32	June 29, 2001	2	2:42	East Rutherford, New Jersey, United States	
Win	19–5–5	Matt Serra	KO (spinning back fist)	UFC 31	May 4, 2001	3	4:51	Atlantic City, New Jersey, United States	
Win	18–5–5	Yuji Hoshino	Decision (majority)	Pancrase: Trans 7	December 4, 2000	1	15:00	Tokyo, Japan	
Loss	17–5–5	Steve Berger	Submission (rear-naked choke)	RSF 1: Reality Submission Fighting 1	October 6, 2000	1	2:41	Belleville, Illinois, United States	
Win	17–4–5	Joe Merit	Decision (unanimous)	RSF 1: Reality Submission Fighting 1	October 6, 2000	1	18:00	Belleville, Illinois, United States	
Loss	16–4–5	Nate Marquardt	Decision (unanimous)	Pancrase: 2000 Anniversary Show	September 24, 2000	2	3:00	Yokohama, Japan	For the inaugural Pancrase Middleweight Championship.
Win	16–3–5	Chris Lytle	Decision (unanimous)	Pancrase: 2000 Anniversary Show	September 24, 2000	3	3:00	Yokohama, Japan	
Win	15–3–5	Yoshinori Kawasaki	Decision (unanimous)	Pancrase: Trans 5	July 23, 2000	1	10:00	Tokyo, Japan	
Win	14–3–5	Adrian Serrano	Decision (unanimous)	UFC 26	June 9, 2000	2	5:00	Cedar Rapids, Iowa, United States	
Draw	13–3–5	Kiuma Kunioku	Draw	Pancrase: Trans 3	April 30, 2000	2	3:00	Yokohama, Japan	
Win	13–3–4	Brad Gumm	Decision (unanimous)	UFC 24	March 10, 2000	2	5:00	Lake Charles, Louisiana, United States	
Win	12–3–4	Kousei Kubota	Decision (unanimous)	Pancrase: Trans 1	January 23, 2000	1	10:00	Tokyo, Japan	
Draw	11–3–4	Takafumi Ito	Draw	Pancrase: Breakthrough 10	November 28, 1999	1	15:00	Osaka, Japan	
Loss	11–3–3	Steve Berger	Decision (split)	IHC 1: Ironheart Crown	November 6, 1999	2	2:00	Chicago, Illinois, United States	
Loss	11–2–3	Pat Miletich	Decision	EC 27: Extreme Challenge 27	August 21, 1999	1	20:00	Davenport, Iowa, United States	
Draw	11–1–3	Simon Posner	Draw	SB 12: SuperBrawl 12	June 1, 1999	3	5:00	Honolulu, Hawaii, United States	
Win	11–1–2	Phil Johns	Submission (knee injury)	EC 23: Extreme Challenge 23	April 2, 1999	1	2:59	Indianapolis, Indiana, United States	
Win	10–1–2	Keith Wisniewski	KO (spinning back fist)	IMAC 3: Indiana Martial Arts Challenge 3	March 6, 1999	1	0:40	Indiana, United States	
Win	9–1–2	Robert Masko	Decision	EB 1: Extreme Brawl 1	October 21, 1998	N/A	N/A	Kenosha, Wisconsin, United States	
Draw	8–1–2	Dave Menne	Draw	EC 20: Extreme Challenge 20	August 22, 1998	1	20:00	Davenport, Iowa, United States	
Win	8–1–1	Carl Davis	Submission (choke)	Tropicana D'Cache Club Fights	June 5, 1998	N/A	N/A	Chicago, Illinois, United States	
Win	7–1–1	Jesse Jones	Submission (frustration)	EC 16: Extreme Challenge 16	March 26, 1998	1	9:05	Council Bluffs, Iowa, United States	
Win	6–1–1	James Clingerman	Decision	IMAC 1: Indiana Martial Arts Challenge 1	March 6, 1998	1	15:00	Laporte, Indiana, United States	
Win	5–1–1	Sean Brockmole	Submission (choke from side mount)	IMAC 1: Indiana Martial Arts Challenge 1	March 6, 1998	1	6:04	Laporte, Indiana, United States	
Win	4–1–1	Todd Taylor	Submission (rear-naked choke)	CF: Combat Fighting	February 14, 1998	N/A	N/A	Chicago, Illinois, United States	
Win	3–1–1	Andy Sanders	Submission (crucifix)	EC 5: Extreme Challenge 5	April 18, 1997	1	3:24	Waterloo, Iowa, United States	
Win	2–1–1	Dave Menne	Decision (split)	EC 5: Extreme Challenge 5	April 18, 1997	1	15:00	Waterloo, Iowa, United States	
Draw	1–1–1	Daniel Vianna	Draw	CC 3: Chicago Challenge 3	March 15, 1997	N/A	N/A	Chicago, Illinois, United States	
Win	1–1	Chad Cox	KO	EC 4: Extreme Challenge 4	February 22, 1997	1	2:45	Council Bluffs, Iowa, United States	
Loss	0–1	Laverne Clark	KO (punches)	EC 3: Extreme Challenge 3	February 15, 1997	1	0:09	Davenport, Iowa, United States	

== Bareknuckle boxing record ==
Professional record breakdown
1 match	0 wins	1 loss
By decision	0	1

Res.	Record	Opponent	Method	Event	Date	Round	Time	Location	Notes
Loss	0-1	Jimmy Sweeney	Decision (unanimous)	BKB 5	May 2017	5	2:00	?, England, Great Britain	For the BKB Middleweight World Championship.

Vacant Title last held by Nick Diaz	2nd WEC Welterweight Champion; October 17, 2003 – May 21, 2004	Succeeded by Karo Parisyan
