= List of World Extreme Cagefighting champions =

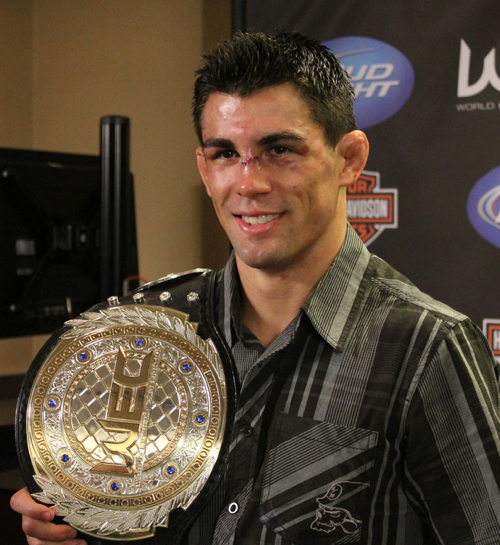
Former Bantamweight Champion Dominick Cruz with the WEC belt.

This is a list of World Extreme Cagefighting (WEC) champions at each weight class.

In December 2006 World Extreme Cagefighting was bought by Zuffa, LLC, the parent company of the UFC, to concentrate on the four smaller weight classes under the Unified Rules of Mixed Martial Arts. Over the next two years, the WEC would phase out weight classes above 155 lbs, with most of the fighters going to the UFC. By the time of the WEC's absorption into the UFC at the end of 2010, the only remaining weight divisions were Lightweight, Featherweight and Bantamweight.

== World Title histories ==
=== Super Heavyweight Championship ===
Weight limit: Unlimited

| No. | Name | Event | Date | Defenses |
|---|---|---|---|---|
| 1 | (United States) Ron Waterman def. James Nevarez | WEC 7 Lemoore, CA, USA | August 9, 2003 | 1. def. Ricco Rodriguez at WEC 16 on August 18, 2005 in Lemoore, CA, USA |
The WEC Super Heavyweight division was abolished in December 2006 when Zuffa purchased the organization.

=== Heavyweight Championship ===
Weight limit: 250 lb (113.4 kg)

| No. | Name | Event | Date | Defenses |
|---|---|---|---|---|
| 1 | (United States) Mike Kyle def. Jude Hargett | WEC 9 Lemoore, CA, USA | January 16, 2004 | |
Title vacated.
| 2 | (United States) Mike Serr def. Rafael del Real | WEC 10; Lemoore, CA, USA | May 21, 2004 | |
Title vacated.
| 3 | (United States) James Irvin def. Houssain Oushani | WEC 12; Lemoore, CA, USA | October 21, 2004 | 1. def. Doug Marshall at WEC 15 on May 19, 2005 in Lemoore, CA, USA |
Irvin vacated the title to fight in the Light Heavyweight division.
| 4 | (United States) Brian Olsen def. Lavar Johnson | WEC 18; Lemoore, CA, USA | January 13, 2006 | 1. def. Mike Kyle at WEC 20 on May 5, 2006 in Lemoore, CA, USA |
The WEC Heavyweight division was abolished in December 2006 when Zuffa purchased the organization.

=== Light Heavyweight Championship ===
Weight limit: 200 lb (90.7 kg)

| No. | Name | Event | Date | Defenses |
|---|---|---|---|---|
| 1 | (United States) Frank Shamrock def. Bryan Pardoe | WEC 6 Lemoore, CA, USA | March 27, 2003 | |
Shamrock vacated in August 2003 to fight for Strikeforce.
| 2 | (United States) Richard Montoya def. Abraham Baxter | WEC 11; Lemoore, CA, USA | August 20, 2004 | |
| 3 | (United States) Jason Lambert | WEC 13; Lemoore, CA, USA | January 22, 2005 | |
Lambert vacated in October 2005 to fight for the UFC.
| 4 | (United States) Scott Smith def. Tait Fletcher | WEC 17; Lemoore, CA, USA | October 14, 2005 | 1. def. Justin Levens at WEC 18 on January 13, 2006 in Lemoore, CA, USA |
Smith vacated in May 2006 to participate in The Ultimate Fighter.
| 5 | (United States) Lodune Sincaid def. Dan Molina | WEC 20; Lemoore, CA, USA | May 5, 2006 | |
| 6 | (United States) Doug Marshall | WEC 23; Lemoore, CA, USA | August 17, 2006 | 1. def. Justin McElfresh at WEC 27 on May 12, 2007 in Las Vegas, NV, USA; 2. def. Ariel Gandulla at WEC 31 on December 12, 2007 in Las Vegas, NV, USA |
| 7 | (United States) Brian Stann | WEC 33; Las Vegas, NV, USA | March 26, 2008 | |
| 8 | (United States) Steve Cantwell | WEC 35; Las Vegas, NV, USA | August 3, 2008 | |
The WEC Light Heavyweight division was absorbed into the UFC on December 3, 2008 so the WEC could further concentrate on lighter weight classes.

=== Middleweight Championship ===
Weight limit: 185 lb (83.9 kg)

| No. | Name | Event | Date | Defenses |
|---|---|---|---|---|
| 1 | (United States) Chris Leben def. Mike Swick | WEC 9 Lemoore, CA, USA | January 16, 2004 | |
Leben vacated to participate The Ultimate Fighter.
| 2 | (United States) Joe Riggs def. Rob Kimmons | WEC 15; Lemoore, CA, USA | May 19, 2005 | |
The WEC Middleweight title was vacated in December 2006 when Zuffa purchased the organization.
| 3 | (Brazil) Paulo Filho def. Joe Doerksen | WEC 29; Las Vegas, NV, USA | August 5, 2007 | 1. def. Chael Sonnen at WEC 31 on December 12, 2007 in Las Vegas, NV, USA |
The WEC Middleweight division was absorbed into the UFC on December 3, 2008, so the WEC could further concentrate on lighter weight classes.

=== Welterweight Championship ===
Weight limit: 170 lb (77.1 kg)

| No. | Name | Event | Date | Defenses |
|---|---|---|---|---|
| 1 | (United States) Nick Diaz def. Joe Hurley | WEC 6 Lemoore, CA, USA | March 27, 2003 | |
Diaz vacated the title to focus on fight for the UFC.
| 2 | (United States) Shonie Carter def. J.T. Taylor | WEC 8 Lemoore, CA, USA | October 17, 2003 | |
| 3 | (Armenia) Karo Parisyan | WEC 10; Lemoore, CA, USA | May 21, 2004 | |
Parisyan vacated the title to focus on fighting for the UFC.
| 4 | (United States) Mike Pyle def. Bret Bergmark | WEC 17; Lemoore, CA, USA | October 14, 2005 | 1. def. Shonie Carter at WEC 18 on Jan 13, 2006 in Lemoore, CA, USA |
The WEC Welterweight title was vacated in December 2006 when Zuffa purchased the organization.
| 5 | (United States) Carlos Condit def. John Alessio | WEC 26; Las Vegas, NV, USA | March 24, 2007 | 1. def. Brock Larson at WEC 29 on Aug 5, 2007 in Las Vegas, NV, USA; 2. def. Carlo Prater at WEC 32 on Feb 13, 2008 in Albuquerque, NM, USA; 3. def. Hiromitsu Miura at WEC 35 on Aug 3, 2008 in Las Vegas, NV, USA |
The WEC Welterweight division was absorbed into the UFC on February 3, 2009, so the WEC could further concentrate on lighter weight classes.

=== Lightweight Championship ===
Weight limit: 155 lb (70.3 kg)

| No. | Name | Event | Date | Defenses |
|---|---|---|---|---|
| 1 | (United States) Kurt Pellegrino def. Mac Danzig | WEC 4 Uncasville, CT, USA | Aug 31, 2002 | |
Pellegrino vacated the title to focus on fighting in other events.
| 2 | (United States) Gilbert Melendez def. Olaf Alfonso | WEC 10; Lemoore, CA, USA | May 21, 2004 | |
Melendez vacated the title to focus on fighting in other events.
| 3 | (United States) Gabe Ruediger def. Olaf Alfonso | WEC 12; Lemoore, CA, USA | October 21, 2004 | 1. def. Jason Maxwell at WEC 14 on Mar 17, 2005 in Lemoore, CA, USA; 2. def. Sam Wells at WEC 17 on Oct 14, 2005 in Lemoore, CA, USA |
| 4 | (Brazil) Hermes França | WEC 19; Lemoore, CA, USA | March 17, 2006 | 1. def. Brandon Olsen at WEC 21 on Jun 15, 2006 in Highland, CA, USA; 2. def. Nate Diaz at WEC 24 on Oct 12, 2006 in Lemoore, CA, USA |
The WEC Lightweight title was vacated in December 2006 when Zuffa purchased the organization and brought França over to the UFC.
| 5 | (United States) Rob McCullough def. Kit Cope | WEC 25; Las Vegas, NV, USA | January 20, 2007 | 1. def. Richard Crunkilton at WEC 30 on Sep 5, 2007 in Las Vegas, NV, USA |
| 6 | (United States) Jamie Varner | WEC 32; Albuquerque, NM, USA | February 13, 2008 | 1. def. Marcus Hicks at WEC 35 on Aug 3, 2008 in Las Vegas, NV, USA; 2. def. Donald Cerrone at WEC 38 on Jan 25, 2009 in San Diego, CA, USA |
| - | (United States) Benson Henderson def. Donald Cerrone for interim title | WEC 43; San Antonio, TX, USA | October 10, 2009 | |
| 7 | (United States) Benson Henderson | WEC 46; Sacramento, CA, USA | January 10, 2010 | 1. def. Donald Cerrone at WEC 48 in April 2010, in Sacramento, CA, USA |
| 8 | (United States) Anthony Pettis | WEC 53; Glendale, AZ, USA | December 16, 2010 | |
The WEC Lightweight division was absorbed into the UFC on December 16, 2010, as part of the UFC-WEC merger.

=== Featherweight Championship ===
Weight limit: 145 lb (65.8 kg)

| No. | Name | Event | Date | Defenses |
|---|---|---|---|---|
| 1 | (United States) Cole Escovedo def. Philip Perez | WEC 5 Lemoore, CA, USA | October 18, 2002 | 1. def. Anthony Hamlett at WEC 8 on Oct 17, 2003 in Lemoore, CA, USA |
| 2 | (United States) Urijah Faber | WEC 19; Lemoore, CA, USA | March 17, 2006 | 1. def. Joe Pearson at WEC 25 on Jan 20, 2007 in Las Vegas, NV, USA; 2. def. Dominick Cruz at WEC 26 on Mar 24, 2007 in Las Vegas, NV, USA; 3. def. Chance Farrar at WEC 28 on Jun 3, 2007 in Las Vegas, NV, USA; 4. def. Jeff Curran at WEC 31 on Dec 12, 2007 in Las Vegas, NV, USA; 5. def. Jens Pulver at WEC 34 on Jun 1, 2008 in Sacramento, CA, USA |
| 3 | (United States) Mike Brown | WEC 36; Hollywood, FL, USA | November 5, 2008 | 1. def. Leonard Garcia at WEC 39 on Mar 1, 2009 in Corpus Christi, TX, USA; 2. def. Urijah Faber at WEC 41 on Jun 7, 2009 in Sacramento, CA, USA |
| 4 | (Brazil) José Aldo | WEC 44; Las Vegas, NV, USA | November 18, 2009 | 1. def. Urijah Faber at WEC 48 on April 24, 2010 in Sacramento, CA, USA; 2. def. Manny Gamburyan at WEC 51 on Sep 30, 2010 in Broomfield, CO, USA |
The WEC Featherweight division was absorbed into the UFC on September 30, 2010, as part of the UFC-WEC merger. José Aldo was awarded the inaugural UFC Featherweight Championship on November 20, 2010.

=== Bantamweight Championship ===
Weight limit: 135 lb (61.2 kg)

| No. | Name | Event | Date | Defenses |
|---|---|---|---|---|
| 1 | (United States) Eddie Wineland def. Antonio Banuelos | WEC 20; Lemoore, CA, USA | May 5, 2006 | |
| 2 | (United States) Chase Beebe | WEC 26; Las Vegas, NV, USA | March 24, 2007 | 1. def. Rani Yahya at WEC 30 on Sep 5, 2007 in Las Vegas, NV, USA |
| 3 | (United States) Miguel Torres | WEC 32; Albuquerque, NM, USA | February 13, 2008 | 1. def. Yoshiro Maeda at WEC 34 on Jun 1, 2008 in Sacramento, CA, USA; 2. def. Manny Tapia at WEC 37 on Dec 3, 2008 in Las Vegas, NV, USA; 3. def. Takeya Mizugaki at WEC 40 on April 5, 2009 in Chicago, IL, USA |
| 4 | (United States) Brian Bowles | WEC 42; Las Vegas, NV, USA | August 9, 2009 | |
| 5 | (United States) Dominick Cruz | WEC 47; Columbus, OH, USA | March 6, 2010 | 1. def. Joseph Benavidez at WEC 50 on Aug 18, 2010 in Las Vegas, NV, USA; 2. def. Scott Jorgensen at WEC 53 on Dec 16, 2010 in Glendale, AZ, USA |
The WEC Bantamweight division was absorbed into the UFC on December 16, 2010, as part of the UFC-WEC merger. Dominick Cruz won the inaugural UFC Bantamweight Championship when he defeated Scott Jorgensen at WEC 53.

== North American Title histories ==
=== North American Heavyweight Championship ===
Weight limit: 265 lb (120.2 kg)

| No. | Name | Event | Date | Defenses |
|---|---|---|---|---|
| 1 | (United States) Doug Marshall def. Anthony Arria | WEC 10; Lemoore, CA, USA | May 21, 2004 | 1. def. Carlos Garcia at WEC 12 on October 21, 2004 in Lemoore, CA, USA |

=== North American Middleweight Championship ===
Weight limit: 185 lb (83.9 kg)

| No. | Name | Event | Date | Defenses |
|---|---|---|---|---|
| 1 | (England) Mark Weir def. Will Bradford | WEC 12; Lemoore, CA, USA | October 21, 2004 | |
| 2 | (Russia) Alex Serdyukov | WEC 14; Lemoore, CA, USA | March 17, 2005 | 1. def. Victor Parfenov at WEC 16 on August 18, 2005 in Lemoore, CA, USA |

=== North American Lightweight Championship ===
Weight limit: 155 lb (70.3 kg)

| No. | Name | Event | Date | Defenses |
|---|---|---|---|---|
| 1 | (United States) Poppies Martinez def. Gabriel Cruz | WEC 10; Lemoore, CA, USA | May 21, 2004 | |

== Native American Title histories ==
=== Native American Super Heavyweight Championship ===
Weight limit: Unlimited

| No. | Name | Event | Date | Defenses |
|---|---|---|---|---|
| 1 | (United States) Dan Christison def. Andre Roberts | WEC 13; Lemoore, CA, USA | January 22, 2005 | |

=== Native American Lightweight Championship ===
Weight limit: 155 lb (70.3 kg)

| No. | Name | Event | Date | Defenses |
|---|---|---|---|---|
| 1 | (United States) Cole Escovedo def. Poppies Martinez | WEC 15; Lemoore, CA, USA | May 19, 2005 | |

== Tournament winners ==
| Event | Date | Division | Winner | Runner-up |
|---|---|---|---|---|
| WEC 13 | January 22, 2005 | Heavyweight | (United States) Brandon Vera | (United States) Mike Whitehead |
| WEC 17 | October 14, 2005 | Light Heavyweight | (United States) Scott Smith | (United States) Tait Fletcher |

== Records ==
=== Most wins in title bouts ===
| Victories | Champion | Division | V | D | NC | L |
|---|---|---|---|---|---|---|
| 6 | (United States) Urijah Faber | Featherweight | 6 | 0 | 0 | 3 |
| 4 | (United States) Miguel Torres | Bantamweight | 4 | 0 | 0 | 1 |
| 4 | (United States) Carlos Condit | Welterweight | 4 | 0 | 0 | 0 |
| 3 | (United States) Doug Marshall | Heavyweight; Light Heavyweight | 0; 3 | 0; 0 | 0; 0 | 1; 1 |
| 3 | (United States) Gabe Ruediger | Lightweight | 3 | 0 | 0 | 1 |
| 3 | (United States) Mike Brown | Featherweight | 3 | 0 | 0 | 1 |
| 3 | (United States) Jamie Varner | Lightweight | 3 | 0 | 0 | 1 |
| 3 | (United States) Benson Henderson | Lightweight | 3 | 0 | 0 | 1 |
| 3 | (United States) Dominick Cruz | Featherweight; Bantamweight | 0; 3 | 0; 0 | 0; 0 | 1; 0 |
| 3 | (Brazil) Hermes França | Lightweight | 3 | 0 | 0 | 0 |
| 3 | (Brazil) José Aldo | Featherweight | 3 | 0 | 0 | 0 |

=== Most consecutive title defenses ===
| Defenses | Champion | Division | Period |
|---|---|---|---|
| 5 | (United States) Urijah Faber | Featherweight | March 17, 2006 – November 5, 2008 |
| 3 | (United States) Carlos Condit | Welterweight | March 24, 2007 – December 3, 2008 |
| 3 | (United States) Miguel Torres | Bantamweight | February 13, 2008 – August 9, 2009 |
| 2 | (United States) Gabe Ruediger | Lightweight | October 21, 2004 – March 17, 2006 |
| 2 | (Brazil) Hermes França | Lightweight | March 17, 2006 – December 2006 |
| 2 | (United States) Doug Marshall | Light Heavyweight | August 17, 2006 – March 26, 2008 |
| 2 | (United States) Jamie Varner | Lightweight | February 13, 2008 – January 10, 2010 |
| 2 | (United States) Mike Brown | Featherweight | November 5, 2008 – August 9, 2009 |
| 2 | (Brazil) José Aldo | Featherweight | November 18, 2009 – September 30, 2010 |
| 2 | (United States) Dominick Cruz | Bantamweight | March 6, 2010 – December 16, 2010 |

== Champions by nationality ==
The division champions includes only linear champions. Interim champions who have never become linear champions will be listed as interim champions. Fighters with multiple title reigns in a specific division will also be counted once. Runners-up are not included in tournaments champions.

| Country | Division champions | Interim champions | Tournaments champions | Total |
|---|---|---|---|---|
| United States | 30 | - | 2 | 32 |
| Brazil | 3 | - | - | 3 |
| Armenia | 1 | - | - | 1 |

== See also ==
- List of WEC events
- List of current mixed martial arts champions
- List of Bellator MMA champions
- List of Dream champions
- List of EliteXC champions
- List of Invicta FC champions
- List of ONE Championship champions
- List of Pancrase champions
- List of Pride champions
- List of PFL champions
- List of Shooto champions
- List of Strikeforce champions
- List of UFC champions
- Mixed martial arts weight classes
