= James Irvin (fighter) =

American mixed martial arts fighter

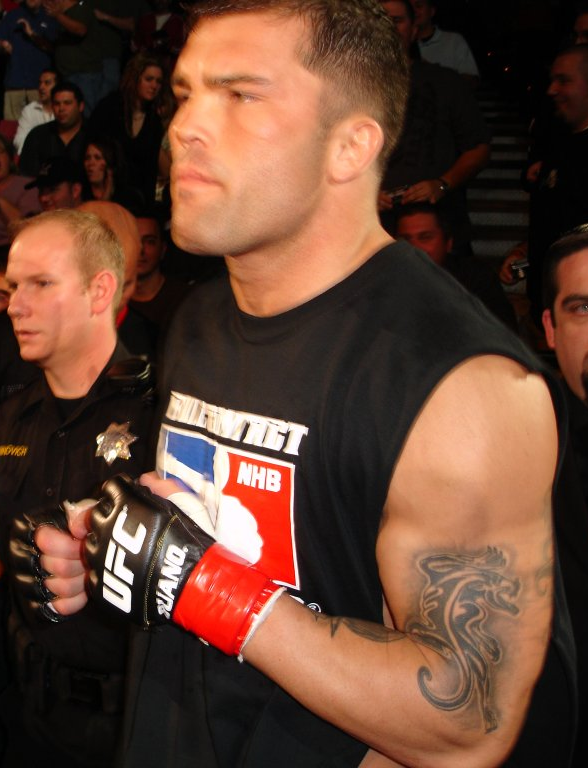
- Born: September 12, 1978 (age 48); Huntington Beach, California, United States
- Other names: The Sandman
- Height: 6 ft 2 in (1.88 m)
- Weight: 185 lb (84 kg; 13 st 3 lb)
- Division: Heavyweight; Light Heavyweight; Middleweight
- Reach: 75.0 in (191 cm)
- Fighting out of: Corona, California, United States
- Team: Capital City Fighting Alliance
- Years active: 2003–2013

Mixed martial arts record
- Total: 29
- Wins: 17
- By knockout: 12
- By submission: 3
- By decision: 1
- By disqualification: 1
- Losses: 10
- By knockout: 5
- By submission: 4
- By decision: 1
- No contests: 2

Other information
- Mixed martial arts record from Sherdog

James Lee Irvin (born September 12, 1978) is a retired American professional mixed martial artist, who was a professional competitor from 2003 to 2012, Irvin is the former WEC Heavyweight Champion and has also competed in the UFC, Strikeforce, Bellator and KSW.

== Background ==
Irvin was born in Huntington Beach and attended Del Oro High School in Loomis, California, where he played football. Irvin's football career continued at Azusa Pacific University, which he attended on an athletic scholarship. Irvin was first introduced to MMA when he saw a match in person, and was very interested. He immediately started Brazilian jiu-jitsu, and began training to become a fighter.

== Mixed martial arts career ==
=== Ultimate Fighting Championship ===
After losing to Mike Kyle in his UFC debut, Irvin returned to the promotion at UFC 54 against boxing specialist and former collegiate wrestler Terry Martin. The much shorter Martin dominated Irvin in round one, but as soon as the bell sounded to start the second round, Irvin came out and landed a flying knee that rendered Martin unconscious. Commentator Joe Rogan called the KO the "best flying knee" he had ever seen.

Irvin defeated Hector Ramirez at UFC 65 via TKO in the second round after dropping Ramirez with a stiff jab, following with a kick to the body, and finishing the fight on the ground with elbows. Both fighters were awarded Fight of the Night awards.

Irvin faced UFC newcomer Thiago Silva on May 26, 2007 at UFC 71. He lost after injuring his knee during one of Silva's takedowns in the first round.

Irvin won a disqualification victory over the formerly undefeated Luiz Cané at UFC 79 after he was illegally kneed in the head by Cané.

On April 2, 2008, Irvin fought Houston Alexander as the opening fight on the main card of UFC Fight Night: Kenny Florian vs Joe Lauzon, knocking Alexander out with a superman punch in 8 seconds. This fight earned him a $20,000 Knockout of the Night award. The 8-second knockout tied the record of fastest knockout in UFC history until UFC 239, where Jorge Masvidal broke the record with a 5-second KO.

Irvin was supposed to fight Rashad Evans at UFC 85 in London, England but he sustained a foot injury that forced him to pull out and Evans was removed from the card as well.

When the UFC's middleweight champion Anderson Silva was to make his light-heavyweight division debut, Irvin became his opponent after four other fighters had already declined. UFC: Silva vs Irvin was intentionally scheduled for July 19, 2008 in order to conflict with the pay-per-view broadcast of Affliction: Banned. Despite Irvin being the larger fighter, he was regarded as a significant underdog. At about one minute into the first round, Silva caught a kick dealt by Irvin and knocked him down with a straight right hand. Silva then followed with a barrage of punches ending the fight by KO. Afterwards, Irvin tested positive for methadone and oxymorphone. Irvin subsequently admitted to taking the drugs, stating that he had begun taking painkillers legally as treatment for injuries, and had then become addicted to them.

Irvin was scheduled to return at UFC 98 against Drew McFedries, making his debut as a middleweight. However, he was unable to fight because of a torn meniscus. Irvin injured his knee, forcing him out of a planned middleweight fight against Wilson Gouveia at UFC 102. This would be second straight event Irvin has backed out of due to the same injury.

Irvin then confirmed he would return on one of the UFC's three shows in March, and was later added to the card at UFC LIVE: Vera vs. Jones where he made his debut as a middleweight against Alessio Sakara. Irvin was defeated in the first round after receiving a punch straight in the eye. He covered up and the referee called timeout, assuming an eye poke had occurred. The replay showed that Sakara delivered a legal punch to Irvin's eye, and the fight ended in a TKO victory for Sakara.

Irvin then returned to light heavyweight and faced Igor Pokrajac on August 1, 2010 at UFC on Versus 2. Midway through the first round, Irvin was taken down and was hit by Pokrajac's shoulder as he hit the floor. While visibly hurt, Irvin rolled over and was submitted by a rear naked choke.

Irvin was released from the UFC following his loss to Pokrajac, his third straight loss with the promotion. President Dana White was complimentary of Irvin, saying he expects to see Irvin back in the UFC someday.

=== Independent promotions ===
After his release from the UFC, Irvin went on to face and defeat Angel DeAnda in Roseville, California on October 2, 2010 at a Rebel Fights event by way of KO to Win Rebel Fight Heavyweight Championship.

Irvin next faced Jorge Oliveira on December 2, 2010 at "Tachi Palace Fights 7: Deck the Halls". Irvin was defeated by Oliveira in the first round by triangle choke.

James Irvin next fought Mike Crisman at Gladiator Challenge Young Guns 4 on January 29, 2011 with special guest Ken Shamrock serving as the referee. The much bigger and stronger Irvin was caught early in the fight by a well placed punch by Crisman. The vet quickly recovered, and caught a sluggish leg kick, taking Crisman down. Crisman scrambled to get back up and was apparently hit with an illegal knee. With Crisman unable to continue, the fight was ruled a no contest because Shamrock judged that the illegal knee was unintentional. Irvin went on to say, "I beat the brakes off this fool...he was sleeping on the ground. Ken Shamrock says I illegally kneed him, so it was a no-contest! I KO'd this guy and walked away before Shamrock even got there, and two minutes later, he says it's a no-contest. It's cool. I don't have a scratch on me, and I'm fighting again in three weeks. That was the luckiest night of that dude's life." Ken Shamrock turned down an offer to fight Irvin. Irvin said from the start that he had a bad feeling about Ken calling the bout.

Houston Alexander revealed that he will face Irvin at Shark Fights 14 on March 11 in Lubbock, Texas. Shark Fights was ultimately forced to cancel the scheduled Irvin vs Alexander II bout after Irvin tested positive for steroids, along with Alexander sustaining an injury during training. Irvin tested positive for epitrenbolone metabolite trenbolone. A steroid used for muscle growth in body builders and farm animals.

While currently suspended from competition in the United States, Irvin opted go to Europe for his next fight. He faced Mamed Khalidov in the main event of KSW 15 on March 19, 2011 and lost by submission.

James Irvin has stated that 2011 will be his "learning year" and wants to earn his way back to the UFC in 2012. Since leaving the UFC he has gone 3-2-1. James has re-located his training to the UFC gym in Corona, and expects to return to action by December 2 when his suspension is lifted. He also hopes to continue fighting at 185 lbs if possible. On February 26, 2012 Irvin was scheduled to fight Brandon Halsey at Gladiator Challenge Bombs Away, but Halsey was replaced by Geovantie Davis the day of the fight. Irvin defeated Davis via TKO. This was his first win since late 2010. Irvin faced yet another Gladiator Challenge Opponent at their March 30 show, "Ringside." A late replacement for a previous unknown opponent, Mike LaFlair was not of the same caliber as Irvin and was mercifully taken down early and submitted at 1:22 of the first round.

In his next fight, he fought Scott Rosa and lost by TKO (knees and punches) in round 2.

=== Bellator MMA ===
In May 2014, it was confirmed that Irvin had signed with Bellator MMA. He was expected to face Brennan Ward at Bellator 123 on September 5, 2014. However, the bout was cancelled. Irvin was then expected to face Brian Rogers at Bellator 125. Irvin pulled out of the bout due to injury and was replaced with Brett Cooper.

== Personal life ==
Irvin is married. Irvin's family owns a construction business and he works construction when he is not fighting. Irvin’s brother, Jesse Irvin is a deputy with the Solano county Sheriffs office. As of 2015, Irvin is a Mixed Martial Arts Instructor and Coach at UFC Gym Rocklin in Rocklin, California.

== Championships and accomplishments ==
- Ultimate Fighting Championship
  - Fight of the Night (One time) vs. Hector Ramirez
  - Knockout of the Night (One time) vs. Houston Alexander
  - UFC Encyclopedia Awards
    - Knockout of the Night (One time) vs. Terry Martin
  - UFC.com Awards
    - 2005: Ranked #4 Knockout of the Year vs. Terry Martin
    - 2008: Ranked #6 Knockout of the Year & Half-Year Awards: Best Knockout of the 1HY vs. Houston Alexander
- World Extreme Cagefighting
  - WEC Heavyweight Championship (One time, first)
    - One successful title defense
- Rebel Fights
  - Rebel Fights Heavyweight Championship (One time)

== Mixed martial arts record ==
Professional record breakdown
| 29 matches | 17 wins | 10 losses |
| By knockout | 12 | 5 |
| By submission | 3 | 4 |
| By decision | 1 | 1 |
| By disqualification | 1 | 0 |
| No contests | 2 | |

| Res. | Record | Opponent | Method | Event | Date | Round | Time | Location | Notes |
|---|---|---|---|---|---|---|---|---|---|
| Loss | 17–10 (2) | Scott Rosa | TKO (knees and punches) | GC: Star Wars | April 29, 2012 | 2 | 1:35 | San Jacinto, California, United States | |
| Win | 17–9 (2) | Mike LaFlair | Submission (armbar) | GC: Ringside | March 30, 2012 | 1 | 1:22 | Lincoln, California, United States | |
| Win | 16–9 (2) | Geovantie Davis | KO (punches) | GC: Bombs Away | February 26, 2012 | 1 | 1:34 | San Jacinto, California, United States | |
| Loss | 15–9 (2) | Mamed Khalidov | Submission (armbar) | KSW 15: Contemporary Gladiators | March 19, 2011 | 1 | 0:33 | Warsaw, Poland | Catchweight (200.6 lb) bout; Irvin missed weight. |
| NC | 15–8 (2) | Mike Crisman | NC (illegal knee) | GC: Young Guns 4 | January 29, 2011 | 1 | 3:32 | Elko, Nevada, United States | Crisman hit with an illegal knee by Irvin. |
| Loss | 15–8 (1) | Jorge Oliveira | Submission (triangle armbar) | TPF 7 | December 2, 2010 | 1 | 1:33 | Lemoore, California, United States | Tested positive for trenbolone. |
| Win | 15–7 (1) | Angel DeAnda | KO (punch) | Rebel Fights: Domination | October 2, 2010 | 1 | 1:42 | Roseville, California, United States | Won the Rebel Fights Heavyweight Championship. |
| Loss | 14–7 (1) | Igor Pokrajac | Submission (rear-naked choke) | UFC Live: Jones vs. Matyushenko | August 1, 2010 | 1 | 2:29 | San Diego, California, United States | Return to Light Heavyweight. |
| Loss | 14–6 (1) | Alessio Sakara | TKO (punch) | UFC Live: Vera vs. Jones | March 21, 2010 | 1 | 3:01 | Broomfield, Colorado, United States | Middleweight debut. |
| Loss | 14–5 (1) | Anderson Silva | KO (punches) | UFC Fight Night: Silva vs. Irvin | July 19, 2008 | 1 | 1:01 | Las Vegas, Nevada, United States | Tested positive for methadone and oxymorphone. |
| Win | 14–4 (1) | Houston Alexander | KO (punches) | UFC Fight Night 13 | April 2, 2008 | 1 | 0:08 | Broomfield, Colorado, United States | Knockout of the Night. |
| Win | 13–4 (1) | Luiz Cané | DQ (illegal knee) | UFC 79 | December 29, 2007 | 1 | 1:51 | Las Vegas, Nevada, United States | |
| Loss | 12–4 (1) | Thiago Silva | TKO (knee injury) | UFC 71 | May 26, 2007 | 1 | 1:06 | Las Vegas, Nevada, United States | |
| Win | 12–3 (1) | Hector Ramirez | TKO (body kick and elbows) | UFC 65 | November 18, 2006 | 2 | 2:36 | Sacramento, California, United States | Fight of the Night. |
| Win | 11–3 (1) | Gary LaFranchi | Submission (armbar) | Valor Fighting: Showdown at Cache Creek II | September 15, 2006 | 1 | 1:47 | Brooks, California, United States | |
| NC | 10–3 (1) | Bobby Southworth | NC (both fighters fell out the cage) | Strikeforce: Revenge | June 9, 2006 | 1 | 0:17 | San Jose, California, United States | |
| Win | 10–3 | William Hill | Decision (unanimous) | IFC: Caged Combat | April 1, 2006 | 3 | 5:00 | Sacramento, California, United States | |
| Loss | 9–3 | Lodune Sincaid | Decision (split) | WEC 19 | March 17, 2006 | 3 | 5:00 | Lemoore, California, United States | |
| Loss | 9–2 | Stephan Bonnar | Submission (kimura) | UFC Fight Night 3 | January 16, 2006 | 1 | 4:30 | Las Vegas, Nevada, United States | |
| Win | 9–1 | Terry Martin | KO (flying knee) | UFC 54 | August 20, 2005 | 2 | 0:09 | Las Vegas, Nevada, United States | Light Heavyweight debut. |
| Win | 8–1 | Doug Marshall | KO (knee) | WEC 15 | May 19, 2005 | 2 | 0:45 | Lemoore, California, United States | Defended the WEC Heavyweight Championship. |
| Loss | 7–1 | Mike Kyle | KO (punch) | UFC 51 | February 5, 2005 | 1 | 1:55 | Las Vegas, Nevada, United States | |
| Win | 7–0 | Houssain Oushani | KO (punch) | WEC 12 | October 21, 2004 | 1 | 2:27 | Lemoore, California, United States | Won the vacant WEC Heavyweight Championship. |
| Win | 6–0 | Jody Poff | TKO (punches) | WEC 11 | August 20, 2004 | 1 | 1:44 | Lemoore, California, United States | |
| Win | 5–0 | Bo Cantrell | KO (knee) | GC 24 | March 20, 2004 | 1 | 2:39 | Hopland, California, United States | |
| Win | 4–0 | Scott Smith | KO (punch) | GC 22 | February 12, 2004 | 1 | 2:21 | Colusa, California, United States | |
| Win | 3–0 | Pete Werve | TKO (doctor stoppage) | GC 20 | November 13, 2003 | 1 | 5:00 | Colusa, California, United States | |
| Win | 2–0 | Allen Scoville | Submission (armbar) | GC 18 | August 21, 2003 | 1 | 2:42 | Colusa, California, United States | |
| Win | 1–0 | Bo Cantrell | KO (knee and punches) | GC 16 | June 1, 2003 | 1 | 2:54 | Colusa, California, United States | |

== See also ==
- List of Strikeforce alumni

| New championship | 1st WEC Heavyweight Champion; August 20, 2004 – January 6, 2006 | Vacant Irvin moved to Light Heavyweight Title next held by Brian Olsen |
