= Gabe Ruediger =

American martial artist

- Born: August 29, 1977 (age 49); Topanga Canyon, California, United States
- Other names: Godzilla
- Height: 5 ft 10 in (1.78 m)
- Weight: 155 lb (70 kg; 11.1 st)
- Division: Lightweight (155 lb)
- Reach: 70 in (180 cm)
- Stance: Orthodox
- Fighting out of: Van Nuys, California
- Team: PKG
- Rank: Orange belt in Judo; Black belt in Brazilian Jiu-Jitsu
- Years active: 2002–2012

Mixed martial arts record
- Total: 26
- Wins: 18
- By knockout: 4
- By submission: 13
- By decision: 1
- Losses: 8
- By knockout: 5
- By submission: 2
- By decision: 1

Other information
- Website: www.gabegodzilla.com
- Mixed martial arts record from Sherdog

Gabriel G. "Gabe" Ruediger (born August 29, 1977) is a former American mixed martial artist, who competed in the Lightweight division for the UFC, WEC and Tachi Palace Fights. He is a former WEC Lightweight Champion, and former TPF Lightweight Champion.

== Mixed martial arts career ==
Ruediger is a retired mixed martial arts fighter from Rancho Cucamonga. He started training in karate when he was seven years old and eventually moved on to kung fu. He was a student at Nevada Union High School. He appeared in a video as Paris Hilton's personal trainer.

Ruediger is a former WEC Lightweight Champion. In the WEC, he maintained a 9 fight winning streak before being defeated by Hermes Franca. Ruediger made his UFC debut at UFC 63, losing to The Ultimate Fighter 2 contestant Melvin Guillard via body punch in the second round.

=== The Ultimate Fighter ===
Ruediger was one of three fighters on The Ultimate Fighter 5 who had previously fought inside the UFC's Octagon (the others being Joe Lauzon and Matt Wiman). Only Lauzon, of the three, had a victory in the UFC. In episode 5, Team Pulver selected Corey Hill to fight Ruediger. The episode showed Ruediger eating ice cream cake after learning of his upcoming fight, shortly before the weigh ins. He was then struggling to make the weight requirement, and let himself be dragged to and from the sauna room, but getting out before it could actually work. Ultimately, Penn and Maynard gave up and walked off as Ruediger literally begged for them to pick him back up. After displaying what could be signs of extreme exhaustion, an ambulance carried him off to the hospital. He took direct criticism from his own coaches and teammates for "taking short cuts" and displaying a lack of dedication, due to his request for a colonic to lose weight (a procedure where they input plastic tubes up your rectum to flush fecal matter out of your system) and his overall poor work ethic. The next day, Dana White dismissed Ruediger from the competition and he was ordered to leave the house.

Ruediger later stated that he saw The Ultimate Fighter show as a "marketing tool" and that audience members should "take what you see on TV with a grain of salt."

=== Post UFC ===
In a March 2007 interview Ruediger says that he would be fighting "very soon" in a "large organization". In an article by Loretta Hunt at The Fight Network, it was revealed that FEG officials had a verbal commitment from Ruediger to fight Katsuhiko Nagata for their June 2 K-1 Dynamite!! USA supercard in Los Angeles. Many unsubstantiated rumours appeared on the Internet regarding his failure to obtain a license to fight in California, asserting that his failure to make weight on The Ultimate Fighter was the reason. These were refuted in an interview with Armando Garcia, the executive director of the California State Athletic Commission (CSAC). According to Garcia, because Ruediger was a late replacement on the K-1 Dynamite card doctors with the CSAC did not have sufficient time to review his medical information, and could not issue him a license in time for the K-1 fight. He was then cleared for a license, fighting 5 times in the state of California since his reinstatement .

=== Return to the UFC ===
After Terry Etim injured himself in preparation for his bout against Joe Lauzon at UFC 118, Ruediger signed a four fight deal with the UFC, and stepped in as Etim's replacement. The fight was selected to be shown on the Spike TV broadcast. Ruediger lost the fight early in the first round via armbar submission.

Ruediger was expected to face Paul Kelly on November 20, 2010 at UFC 123. However, Ruediger was forced out of the bout with a groin injury.

Ruediger faced Paul Taylor on February 5, 2011 at UFC 126. Ruediger was defeated via second round KO and subsequently released from the promotion.

=== Post UFC ===
Ruediger faced Scott "KO" Catlin on March 16, 2012 at BAMMA BadBeat 5 and lost via TKO from punches 36 seconds into the second round.

Gabe fought SiriusXM radio host Jason Ellis in a celebrity boxing match at Ellismania 8 "Shave my Friends Tonight" in Las Vegas on July 14, 2012. Gabe was KO'd by Ellis in the 2nd round. Ruediger contested that Ellis had cheated by using different wraps, gloves, and headgear and stated that if they wore the same gear, Ellis would not have won the fight. Gabe then requested a rematch with Ellis and the two fought at Ellismania 9. Gabe lost the decision 29-28, and was generally dominated by Ellis.

== Championships and accomplishments ==
- Tachi Palace Fights
  - TPF Lightweight Championship (One time)
- World Extreme Cagefighting
  - WEC Lightweight Championship (One time)
    - Two successful title defenses
  - Tied (Jamie Varner; Hermes França) for most consecutive successful defenses in the Lightweight division
  - Tied (Jamie Varner; Hermes França) for most successful defenses in the Lightweight division

== Mixed martial arts record ==
Professional record breakdown
| 26 matches | 18 wins | 8 losses |
| By knockout | 4 | 5 |
| By submission | 13 | 2 |
| By decision | 1 | 1 |

| Res. | Record | Opponent | Method | Event | Date | Round | Time | Location | Notes |
|---|---|---|---|---|---|---|---|---|---|
| Win | 18–8 | Scott Catlin | Submission (armbar) | Bamma USA: Bad Beat 9 | May 31, 2013 | 2 | 2:13 | Commerce, California, United States | Retired shortly after the fight. |
| Loss | 17–8 | Scott Catlin | TKO (punches) | Bamma USA: Bad Beat 5 | March 16, 2012 | 2 | 0:36 | Anaheim, California, United States | |
| Loss | 17–7 | Paul Taylor | KO (head kick and punches) | UFC 126 | February 5, 2011 | 2 | 1:42 | Las Vegas, Nevada, United States | |
| Loss | 17–6 | Joe Lauzon | Submission (armbar) | UFC 118 | August 28, 2010 | 1 | 2:01 | Boston, Massachusetts, United States | |
| Win | 17–5 | Lenny Lovato | TKO (punches) | TPF 5: Stars and Strikes | July 9, 2010 | 1 | 3:25 | Lemoore, California, United States | Won the vacant TPF Lightweight Championship. |
| Win | 16–5 | Dominique Robinson | Submission (rear-naked choke) | TPF 3: Champions Collide | February 4, 2010 | 2 | 4:49 | Lemoore, California, United States | |
| Win | 15–5 | Wander Braga | Submission (guillotine choke) | Call to Arms: Called Out Fights | August 15, 2009 | 2 | 0:58 | Ontario, California, United States | |
| Win | 14–5 | Adam Lehman | Submission (rear-naked choke) | Fight Circuit MMA: Victorious | June 7, 2009 | 1 | 2:19 | Adelanto, California, United States | |
| Win | 13–5 | Darren Crisp | Submission (guillotine choke) | PFC 13: Validation | May 8, 2009 | 1 | 1:03 | Lemoore, California, United States | |
| Win | 12–5 | Max Son | Submission (rear-naked choke) | Gladiator Challenge: Warriors | February 4, 2009 | 1 | 0:24 | Pauma Valley, California, United States | |
| Loss | 11–5 | Justin Wilcox | Decision (unanimous) | JG and TKT Promotions: Fighting 4 Kidz | August 30, 2008 | 3 | 5:00 | Santa Monica, California, United States | |
| Loss | 11–4 | Akbarh Arreola | Submission (kimura) | MMA Xtreme 15 | November 16, 2007 | 1 | 2:03 | Mexico City, Mexico | |
| Win | 11–3 | George Kassimatis | Submission (guillotine choke) | Ringside Ticket | August 30, 2007 | 1 | 3:51 | Highland, California, United States | |
| Loss | 10–3 | Melvin Guillard | TKO (punch to the body) | UFC 63: Hughes vs. Penn | September 23, 2006 | 2 | 1:01 | Anaheim, California, United States | |
| Win | 10–2 | Savant Young | Submission (armbar) | PF 1: The Beginning | May 12, 2006 | 3 | 1:29 | Hollywood, California, United States | |
| Loss | 9–2 | Hermes França | KO (punches) | WEC 19: Undisputed | March 17, 2006 | 1 | 0:36 | Lemoore, California, United States | Lost the WEC Lightweight Championship. |
| Win | 9–1 | Sam Wells | Decision (unanimous) | WEC 17: Halloween Fury 4 | October 14, 2005 | 3 | 5:00 | Lemoore, California, United States | Defended the WEC Lightweight Championship. |
| Win | 8–1 | Bobir Hasanov | Submission (armbar) | KOTC 61: Flash Point | September 23, 2005 | 1 | 0:23 | San Jacinto, California, United States | |
| Win | 7–1 | Jason Maxwell | Submission (rear-naked choke) | WEC 14: Vengeance | March 17, 2005 | 1 | 3:28 | Lemoore, California, United States | Defended the WEC Lightweight Championship. |
| Win | 6–1 | Olaf Alfonso | Submission (rear-naked choke) | WEC 12 | October 21, 2004 | 1 | 3:05 | Lemoore, California, United States | Won the vacant WEC Lightweight Championship. |
| Win | 5–1 | Steve Ramerez | Submission (triangle choke) | WEC 11 | August 20, 2004 | 1 | 1:24 | Lemoore, California, United States | |
| Win | 4–1 | Cory Reeves | TKO (punches) | IFC: Battleground Tahoe | January 31, 2004 | 1 | 2:40 | Lake Tahoe, Nevada, United States | |
| Win | 3–1 | Carlos Cordero | TKO (punches) | WEC 7 | August 9, 2003 | 1 | 2:57 | Lemoore, California, United States | |
| Win | 2–1 | Phat Houng | Submission (rear-naked choke) | Pit Fighting Championship | July 16, 2003 | 1 | 1:10 | N/A | |
| Win | 1–1 | Josh Gardner | TKO (punches) | Gladiator Challenge 14 | February 16, 2003 | 1 | 1:41 | Porterville, California, United States | |
| Loss | 0–1 | Sam Wells | KO (punch) | WEC 5: Halloween Havoc | October 18, 2002 | 1 | 4:27 | Lemoore, California, United States | |

| Awards and achievements | Vacant Title last held by Gilbert Melendez | 2nd WEC Lightweight Champion; October 21, 2004 - March 17, 2006 | Succeeded by Hermes Franca |
