= Joe Riggs =

American mixed martial arts fighter

- Born: September 23, 1982 (age 44); Sanford, Maine, United States
- Other names: Diesel
- Height: 6 ft 0 in (1.83 m)
- Weight: 170 lb (77 kg; 12 st 2 lb)
- Division: Heavyweight; Light Heavyweight; Middleweight; Welterweight
- Reach: 70 in (178 cm)
- Style: Boxing
- Stance: Southpaw
- Fighting out of: Phoenix, Arizona, United States
- Team: Grace Fighting Systems
- Rank: Black belt in Brazilian Jiu-Jitsu
- Years active: 2001–present

Professional boxing record
- Total: 2
- Losses: 1
- By knockout: 1
- No contests: 1

Mixed martial arts record
- Total: 70
- Wins: 49
- By knockout: 37
- By submission: 7
- By decision: 4
- By disqualification: 1
- Losses: 18
- By knockout: 9
- By submission: 6
- By decision: 3
- Draws: 1
- No contests: 2

Other information
- Boxing record from BoxRec
- Mixed martial arts record from Sherdog

Joseph Jonathan Riggs (born September 23, 1982) is an American professional bare-knuckle boxer and former mixed martial artist who was most recently signed to Bare Knuckle Fighting Championship.

He formerly competed for the UFC, WEC, Strikeforce, Bellator, ProElite, M-1 Global, and King of the Cage. Riggs is the former WEC Middleweight Champion. His MMA career ended with a failed drug test, that left him with a no-contest against George Sullivan

== Background ==
Born in Sanford, Maine, and raised in Phoenix, Arizona, Riggs began boxing as a child with his father. Although Riggs is right handed, he was encouraged by his boxing coach to fight southpaw, making his power hand his left hand. Riggs began wrestling at Cactus High School in Glendale, Arizona. He followed in the footsteps of his hero, Randy Couture, and became an All-American twice, at Glendale Community College (Arizona), where he studied to get a Criminal Justice degree. Riggs has trained at Arizona Combat Sports under the Lally brothers, MMA Lab under John Crouch and TNT Training Center under Scott Tannenbaum.

== Mixed martial arts career ==
=== Early career ===
Riggs made his professional mixed martial arts debut in 2001 and compiled a record of 13–3 with one no contest before being signed by the WEC.

=== UFC and WEC ===
Riggs made his WEC debut at WEC 9 against Alex Stiebling, in what was also his debut at Light Heavyweight. Riggs lost via triangle choke submission in the second round. But after the fight people started to take notice of Riggs. Although he lost the fight, he battered Stiebling so badly that after the fight he had to be helped out of the cage and taken to a hospital. Reports said that almost everyone at ring side had Stiebling's blood on both them and their paperwork. The promoter Scott Adams said the fight could and should have been stopped at several points in the fight, leading it to be known as one of the most brutal fights in WEC history. After that he went down to middle weight to fight Isidro Gonzalez in the WEC. Where Riggs finished the fight early in the 1st Round by TKO. After his impressive victory over Gonzalez the WEC gave him a shot at the vacant Middleweight Title against the undefeated Rob Kimmons. Riggs put on a very impressive performance by stopping Kimmons early in the 1st round, earning him the WEC world title, which he held for the next 2 years.

Riggs' dream of fighting in the UFC materialized in 2004, in a winning bout against Canadian fighter Joe Doerksen. After that Riggs moved down to Welterweight to fight veteran Chris Lytle. Riggs went on to win the fight by 2nd-round TKO. And was the 1st and only man to ever stop the very popular battler Chris Lytle. Then after being named the UFCs number 1 Welter Weight contender. Riggs received his shot at the UFC Welterweight Championship at UFC 56 in November 2005 against Matt Hughes. He was originally supposed to face the winner of the upcoming title fight. But got called to fight just a month after the defeating Lytle in UFC 55 to face long time champion Hughes for the UFC Welter Weight title.

Originally, the title shot was offered to Karo Parisyan, who had to withdraw due to a torn hamstring. When Riggs was contacted to take Parisyan's place he jumped at the chance, despite having fought at UFC 55 just a month earlier. However, Riggs did not make the required weight and the fight was declared a non-title event, due to Hughes allowing Riggs to fight him (if a fighter does not make weight for a match, the match may still take place if their opponent allows it). Despite his efforts, Riggs could not mount a significant challenge; Hughes took him down and submitted him with a kimura from half-guard just minutes into the first round of the fight.

Following his loss to Hughes, Riggs rebounded to win against future longtime Strikeforce Welterweight Champion, Nick Diaz via decision at UFC 57. In the hospital room after the fight, Diaz and Riggs got into a physical altercation where they had to be separated by police.

Riggs then moved up to Middleweight to face The Ultimate Fighter alumnus Mike Swick. Early in the fight Riggs was caught in a guillotine choke and tapped out. Riggs then fought The Ultimate Fighter 2's Jason Von Flue, submitting him with a triangle choke.

Riggs' last UFC bout was on December 13, 2006, against Welterweight contender Diego Sanchez at UFC Fight Night 7. Riggs lost the fight due to knockout from a hook followed by a knee in 1:45 of the first round.

Following the fight with Sanchez, Riggs chose to go to the WEC and compete for the vacant WEC Middleweight Championship, but had to pull out of the fight the day before because of a recurring back injury.

=== Strikeforce ===
Riggs lost to Cory Devela via submission in his Strikeforce debut at Strikeforce: At The Dome.

Riggs was to return to action on Strikeforce: Melendez vs. Thomson, facing Jiujitsu specialist Luke Stewart. Riggs stepped in as a late replacement for Shonie Carter, who was injured in training. The fight was to be contested at a catchweight of 178 pounds. However, he was denied licensure by the California State Athletic Commission after disclosing his recent use of prescription medication during the licensing process. Riggs lost to Kazuo Misaki at Strikeforce at the Playboy Mansion via controversial stoppage on September 20, 2008.

Riggs won his next fight at Strikeforce: Destruction on November 21, 2008, against Luke Stewart by TKO (Punches) in 2nd round 2:05. Riggs broke his hand throwing the first punch of the bout, but managed to rally in the second round, breaking Stewart's nose in the process.

Riggs next fought on the Strikeforce: Lawler vs. Shields card from the Scottrade Center in St. Louis, MO on June 6, 2009, against Phil "The New York Badass" Baroni in a three-round welterweight bout that won him the interim Strike Force Welter Weight title and that was broadcast live on the Showtime cable network. In a performance that featured his versatile standup game, including several flying knees, Riggs won a unanimous decision over Baroni.

In his next fight, Riggs faced Jay Hieron on January 30, 2010, at Strikeforce: Miami. Riggs lost the fight via unanimous decision.

In the main event of Strikeforce Challengers: Riggs vs. Taylor, Riggs faced up and coming Middleweight Louis Taylor. "Diesel" won by submission due to strikes in the third round.

On December 9, 2010, it was announced that Riggs has parted ways with Strikeforce.

=== Bellator ===
About a month later, on January 10, 2011, Riggs signed with Bellator to fight in its Middleweight division. Riggs made his Bellator debut against Season 2 Middleweight Tournament Finalist Bryan Baker at Bellator 43. After a back and forth fight, Baker knocked Riggs out with a left hook late in the second round.

=== Independent promotions ===
Three months after his knockout loss to Baker at Bellator 43, In a rematch from their bout in 2004 Riggs fought The Ultimate Fighter 3 winner and fellow UFC veteran Kendall Grove. Grove quickly defeated Riggs by submission due to a guillotine choke, Thus avenging his previous loss to Riggs. For the first time in his ten-year career as a mixed martial artist Riggs has lost three straight fights.

After the loss to Grove he went on a five-fight win streak.

=== Fight Master: Bellator MMA ===
On May 6, 2013, it was announced that Riggs would be featured as a participant on Bellator's reality TV show Fight Master: Bellator MMA, competing as a Welterweight.

In his first fight to get into the house, Riggs defeated UK fighter Rob Mills via heel hook submission in the first round and subsequently chose to join Greg Jackson's team. In the preliminary round, Riggs defeated Eric Scallan via unanimous decision and went on to the quarterfinal round where he defeated Evan Cutts via unanimous decision. In the semifinal round, Riggs defeated number one seed Cole Williams in a three-round split decision victory. He made it to the tournament finals with Mike Bronzoulis.

Riggs was set to face Mike Bronzoulis in the Fight Master Finale on September 7, 2013, at Bellator 98. However, on September 3, it was revealed Riggs has sustained a significant eye injury and the bout was postponed indefinitely. The bout took place on November 2, 2013, at Bellator 106. Riggs won the fight via unanimous decision to become the first winner of Fight Master.

=== Return to UFC ===
After becoming the first winner of Fight Master, Riggs was expected to return to UFC and face Paulo Thiago at UFC Fight Night 51 on September 13, 2014, replacing an injured Mike Rhodes. However, Riggs was forced to pull out of the fight after accidentally shooting himself in the hand and leg while cleaning a pistol at his home.

Riggs made his eventual return against Ben Saunders at UFC on Fox: dos Santos vs. Miocic on December 13, 2014, at US Airways Center in Phoenix, Arizona. The fight ended early in the first round by TKO due to injury when Riggs hurt his neck on a take down and tapped out shortly thereafter.

Joe Riggs faced Patrick Côté on April 25, 2015, at UFC 186. Riggs lost the back-and-forth fight by unanimous decision.

Riggs was expected to face Uriah Hall in a middleweight bout on August 8, 2015, at UFC Fight Night 73. However, Riggs pulled out of the fight in late July, citing an injury, and was replaced by promotional newcomer Oluwale Bamgbose.

Following a quick recovery, Riggs faced Ron Stallings on September 5, 2015, at UFC 191. Riggs won the bout via disqualification after Stallings landed an illegal upkick, which rendered Riggs unable to continue.

Riggs faced Chris Camozzi on February 21, 2016, at UFC Fight Night 83. He lost the fight via TKO in the first round due a series of knees by Camozzi, which broke the right forearm of Riggs. On April 13, Riggs was released from the promotion.

=== Post UFC ===
In his first bout post his second UFC release, Riggs achieved a catchweight victory over Cody McKenzie in Medicine Hat, Alberta, Canada. They continued their winning streak with victories over Billy Martin, Jerome Jones, Dmitry Samoilov, and Shonie Carter, ultimately winning the vacant Fight Night Light Heavyweight Championship on September 9, 2017. Riggs then went on to win against Oleg Olenichev and Erick Lozano, securing the KOP Middleweight Championship on February 24, 2018. After a draw against Borys Polezhai, Riggs faced a loss against Artem Frolov on June 1, 2018, for the M-1 Middleweight Championship. The fighter bounced back with a win over Dan Yates on January 4, 2019, before their most recent fight against George Sullivan was overturned due to a positive test for PEDs.

== Bare-knuckle boxing ==
=== BKB ===
Riggs recently started competing in Bare Knuckle Boxing matches under the UK based BKB promotion. He won a championship fight against Christian “Fat Boy“ Evans, an experienced bare knuckle fighter who had also been featured in the documentary "Bare Knuckle Fight Club" from Channel 4 news, by unanimous decision at BKB 4. Riggs was deducted 1 point in the first round for shooting for a take-down and taking his opponent to the mat, and was warned again in the same round after throwing an illegal elbow.

=== BKFC ===
Riggs signed with the BKFC in 2018 and made his promotional debut against Brok Weaver at BKFC 3 on October 20, 2018. He won the bout via unanimous decision.

He made his sophomore appearance in the promotion against Heriberto Tovar at BKFC 4 on February 2, 2019. He won the fight via unanimous decision.

He then faced Walber Brito de Barros at BKFC 6 on June 22, 2019. The bout was ruled a unanimous draw.

Riggs was expected to headline BKFC 10 against fellow UFC veteran Héctor Lombard in February 2020. However, in January, the company announced that Lombard would be facing David Mundell instead, with no further information.

Riggs then faced Héctor Lombard for the inaugural BKFC Cruiserweight Championship at BKFC 18 on June 26, 2021. He lost the fight via fourth-round technical knockout.

Riggs faced Melvin Guillard at BKFC Fight Night 1 on October 9, 2021. He won the fight via first-minute knockout.

Riggs faced Lorenzo Hunt on April 30, 2022 at BKFC 24 for the BKFC Light Heavyweight Championship and lost by knockout in the second round.

Riggs was scheduled to face Joseph Creer on August 3, 2024 at BKFC 63. However, the bout was removed from the card for unknown reasons.

== Personal life ==
Joe and his ex-wife have a daughter named Jadin who is 3 years younger than his son.

== Championships and accomplishments ==
- Bellator MMA
  - Fight Master: Bellator MMA Season One Winner
- World Extreme Cagefighting
  - WEC Middleweight Championship (One time)
- Ultimate Fighting Championship
  - Submission of the Night (One time) vs. Jason Von Flue
- Z Promotions
  - Light Heavyweight Championship vs. Shonie Carter
- Bare Knuckle Boxing™️
  - BKB Light Heavyweight World Championship
- Bare Knuckle Fighting Championship
  - BKFC Knockout of the Year 2022 vs. Melvin Guillard

R

== Mixed martial arts record ==
Professional record breakdown
70 matches	49 wins	18 losses
By knockout	37	9
By submission	7	6
By decision	4	3
By disqualification	1	0
Draws	1	
No contests	2	

Res.	Record	Opponent	Method	Event	Date	Round	Time	Location	Notes
NC	49–18–1 (2)	George Sullivan	NC (overturned)	Ring of Combat 70	November 23, 2019	3	2:08	Atlantic City, New Jersey, United States	Originally a TKO stoppage victory for Riggs, overturned after Riggs tested positive for PEDs.
Win	49–18–1 (1)	Dan Yates	TKO (submission to punches)	KOP 63	January 4, 2019	1	3:31	Muskegon, Michigan, United States	
Loss	48–18–1 (1)	Artem Frolov	TKO (knee injury)	M-1 Challenge 93: Shlemenko vs. Silva	June 1, 2018	2	0:46	Chelyabinsk, Russia	For the M-1 Global Middleweight Championship.
Draw	48–17–1 (1)	Borys Polezhai	Draw (split)	M-1 Challenge 90: Kunchenko vs. Butenko	March 30, 2018	3	5:00	St. Petersburg, Russia	
Win	48–17 (1)	Erick Lozano	TKO (punches)	KOP 60	February 24, 2018	2	N/A	Grand Rapids, Michigan, United States	Won the KOP Middleweight Championship.
Win	47–17 (1)	Oleg Olenichev	TKO (punches)	M-1 Challenge 84: Kunchenko vs. Romanov	October 27, 2017	3	3:21	Saint Petersburg, Russia	
Win	46–17 (1)	Shonie Carter	TKO (punches)	Z Promotions: Fight Night Medicine Hat 4	September 9, 2017	2	4:54	Medicine Hat, Alberta, Canada	Won vacant Fight Night Light Heavyweight Championship.
Win	45–17 (1)	Dmitry Samoilov	TKO (punches)	M-1 Challenge 81: Battle in the Mountains 6	July 22, 2017	3	1:24	Nazran, Ingushetia, Russia	
Win	44–17 (1)	Jerome Jones	TKO (punches)	WXC 68	April 8, 2017	1	0:27	Ypsilanti, Michigan, United States	
Win	43–17–(1)	Billy Martin	TKO (punches)	ICF 27: The Last Stand	April 8, 2017	1	1:48	Great Falls, Montana, United States	
Win	42–17 (1)	Cody McKenzie	TKO (submission to punches)	Z Promotions: Fight Night Medicine Hat 2	October 28, 2016	1	1:51	Medicine Hat, Alberta, Canada	Catchweight (180 lbs) bout.
Loss	41–17 (1)	Chris Camozzi	TKO (knees)	UFC Fight Night: Cowboy vs. Cowboy	February 21, 2016	1	0:26	Pittsburgh, Pennsylvania, United States	
Win	41–16 (1)	Ron Stallings	DQ (illegal upkick)	UFC 191	September 5, 2015	2	2:28	Las Vegas, Nevada, United States	Return to Middleweight.
Loss	40–16 (1)	Patrick Côté	Decision (unanimous)	UFC 186	April 25, 2015	3	5:00	Montreal, Quebec, Canada	
Loss	40–15 (1)	Ben Saunders	TKO (neck injury)	UFC on Fox: dos Santos vs. Miocic	December 13, 2014	1	0:57	Phoenix, Arizona, United States	
Win	40–14 (1)	Mike Bronzoulis	Decision (unanimous)	Bellator 106	November 2, 2013	3	5:00	Long Beach, California, United States	Won Fight Master: Bellator MMA Season One.
Win	39–14 (1)	Cris Leyva	TKO (punches)	RITC 164	November 16, 2012	1	2:28	Chandler, Arizona, United States	
Win	38–14 (1)	Josh Cavan	KO (punches)	Made For War 1	October 13, 2012	1	4:16	Castle Rock, Colorado, United States	Return to Welterweight.
Win	37–14 (1)	Shane Johnson	KO (punch)	RITC 160	June 22, 2012	2	2:33	Chandler, Arizona, United States	
Win	36–14 (1)	Aaron Brink	Submission (armbar)	RITC 159	May 11, 2012	2	1:18	Chandler, Arizona, United States	Light Heavyweight bout.
Win	35–14 (1)	Shannon Ritch	TKO (punches)	Duel for Domination	November 26, 2011	1	0:56	Phoenix, Arizona, United States	
Loss	34–14 (1)	Kendall Grove	Submission (guillotine choke)	ProElite 1	August 27, 2011	1	0:59	Honolulu, Hawaii, United States	
Loss	34–13 (1)	Bryan Baker	KO (punch)	Bellator 43	May 7, 2011	2	3:53	Newkirk, Oklahoma, United States	Return to Middleweight.
Loss	34–12 (1)	Jordan Mein	TKO (punches)	Wreck MMA: Strong & Proud	January 28, 2011	2	4:30	Gatineau, Quebec, Canada	Catchweight (184 lbs) bout. Riggs missed weight
Win	34–11 (1)	Trent Thorne	TKO (elbows)	KOTC: 48	November 21, 2010	1	3:56	Edmonton, Alberta, Canada	Middleweight bout.
Win	33–11 (1)	Louis Taylor	TKO (submission to punches)	Strikeforce Challengers: Riggs vs. Taylor	August 13, 2010	3	2:07	Phoenix, Arizona, United States	Catchweight (182 lbs) bout.
Loss	32–11 (1)	Jay Hieron	Decision (unanimous)	Strikeforce: Miami	January 30, 2010	3	5:00	Sunrise, Florida, United States	
Win	32–10 (1)	Nick Almen	TKO (submission to punches and elbows)	Ironman MMA 1	December 11, 2009	1	1:51	Welch, Minnesota, United States	
Win	31–10 (1)	David Barnes	TKO (punches)	RITC 138	December 4, 2009	1	0:57	Mesa, Arizona, United States	
Win	30–10 (1)	Phil Baroni	Decision (unanimous)	Strikeforce: Lawler vs. Shields	June 6, 2009	3	5:00	St. Louis, Missouri, United States	Return to Welterweight.
Win	29–10 (1)	Luke Stewart	TKO (punches)	Strikeforce: Destruction	November 21, 2008	2	2:05	San Jose, California, United States	Catchweight (178 lbs) bout.
Loss	28–10 (1)	Kazuo Misaki	TKO (punches)	Strikeforce: At The Mansion II	September 20, 2008	2	2:29	Beverly Hills, California, United States	
Win	28–9 (1)	Matt Dempsey	Submission (rear-naked choke)	RITC 112	July 26, 2008	2	1:47	Prescott, Arizona, United States	
Loss	27–9 (1)	Cory Devela	TKO (slam)	Strikeforce: At The Dome	February 23, 2008	1	1:22	Tacoma, Washington, United States	
Win	27–8 (1)	Eugene Jackson	KO (punches)	Strikeforce: Playboy Mansion	September 29, 2007	1	3:56	Beverly Hills, California, United States	
Win	26–8 (1)	Dan Chambers	Submission (triangle choke)	Hardcore Championship Fighting: Unfinished Business	July 21, 2007	1	3:25	Edmonton, Alberta, Canada	Middleweight bout.
Loss	25–8 (1)	Diego Sanchez	KO (knee)	UFC Fight Night: Sanchez vs. Riggs	December 13, 2006	1	1:45	San Diego, California, United States	Sanchez tested positive for marijuana.
Win	25–7 (1)	Jason Von Flue	Submission (triangle choke)	UFC Fight Night 6	August 17, 2006	1	2:01	Las Vegas, Nevada, United States	Submission of the Night.
Loss	24–7 (1)	Mike Swick	Submission (guillotine choke)	UFC 60	May 27, 2006	1	2:19	Los Angeles, California, United States	Middleweight bout.
Win	24–6 (1)	Nick Diaz	Decision (unanimous)	UFC 57	February 4, 2006	3	5:00	Las Vegas, Nevada, United States	
Loss	23–6 (1)	Matt Hughes	Submission (kimura)	UFC 56	November 19, 2005	1	3:28	Las Vegas, Nevada, United States	Originally for the UFC Welterweight Championship; changed to a non-title bout when Riggs missed weight (172 lb).
Win	23–5 (1)	Chris Lytle	TKO (doctor stoppage)	UFC 55	October 7, 2005	2	2:00	Uncasville, Connecticut, United States	Welterweight debut.
Win	22–5 (1)	Rob Kimmons	TKO (submission to punches)	WEC 15	May 19, 2005	1	1:24	Lemoore, California, United States	Won the vacant WEC Middleweight Championship.
Loss	21–5 (1)	Ivan Salaverry	Submission (triangle choke)	UFC 52	April 16, 2005	1	2:42	Las Vegas, Nevada, United States	
Win	21–4 (1)	Thomas Gil	Submission (armbar)	RITC 66	November 13, 2004	1	2:05	Phoenix, Arizona, United States	
Win	20–4 (1)	Isidro Gonzalez	TKO (punches and elbows)	WEC 12	October 21, 2004	1	1:50	Lemoore, California, United States	
Win	19–4 (1)	Joe Doerksen	TKO (submission to elbows)	UFC 49	August 21, 2004	2	3:39	Las Vegas, Nevada, United States	
Win	18–4 (1)	Shane Johnson	KO (punches)	XCF 5: Evolution	May 28, 2004	1	N/A	Phoenix, Arizona, United States	
Win	17–4 (1)	Kendall Grove	KO (elbows)	Rumble on the Rock 5	May 7, 2004	1	3:09	Honolulu, Hawaii, United States	Middleweight debut.
Win	16–4 (1)	Dave Vitkay	KO (punches)	ICC: Trials 2	April 30, 2004	1	N/A	Minnesota, United States	
Win	15–4 (1)	John Renken	KO (punch)	RITC 60: 'The Saint' Goes Marching In	March 20, 2004	1	0:28	Phoenix, Arizona, United States	
Win	14–4 (1)	Chris Kiever	KO (punch)	IFC: Battleground Tahoe	January 31, 2004	1	0:49	Lake Tahoe, Nevada, United States	
Loss	13–4 (1)	Alex Stiebling	Submission (triangle choke)	WEC 9	January 16, 2004	2	1:54	Lemoore, California, United States	Light Heavyweight debut.
Win	13–3 (1)	Cory Timmerman	Submission (armbar)	RITC 57: Tucson Revisited	December 13, 2003	1	1:11	Tucson, Arizona, United States	
Win	12–3 (1)	Frank Alcala	TKO (punches)	IFC: Rumble on the Rio	December 6, 2003	1	0:31	Hidalgo, Texas, United States	
NC	11–3 (1)	Andy Montana	No Contest	RITC 53: The Beat Goes On	September 13, 2003	N/A	N/A	Phoenix, Arizona, United States	
Win	11–3	Greg Wikan	TKO (corner stoppage)	ECS: Evolution	July 19, 2003	3	5:00	Phoenix, Arizona, United States	
Win	10–3	Will Hammond	TKO (punches)	Art of War 2	June 21, 2003	1	N/A	Kalispell, Montana, United States	
Loss	9–3	Travis Fulton	Submission (choke)	RITC 45: Finally	March 1, 2003	1	0:48	Phoenix, Arizona, United States	
Win	9–2	Herb Dean	TKO (submission to punches)	RITC 43: The Match	January 18, 2003	1	0:52	Phoenix, Arizona, United States	
Loss	8–2	Wesley Correira	KO (knee and punch)	Rumble on the Rock 1	December 28, 2002	2	2:07	Honolulu, Hawaii, United States	
Win	8–1	Lemuel Vincent	TKO (punches)	RITC 42: Road Trip	December 7, 2002	1	0:23	Phoenix, Arizona, United States	
Win	7–1	Allan Sullivan	Submission (armbar)	RITC 39: Bring It	October 19, 2002	3	1:57	Phoenix, Arizona, United States	
Win	6–1	Joe Pardo	Decision (unanimous)	RITC 38: Let's Roll	September 7, 2002	3	3:00	Phoenix, Arizona, United States	
Win	5–1	Jess Morton	TKO (retirement)	RITC 36: The Rematch	June 22, 2002	1	3:00	Phoenix, Arizona, United States	
Win	4–1	Andy Montana	TKO (submission to punches)	RITC 35: This Time It's Personal	May 3, 2002	1	1:24	Phoenix, Arizona, United States	
Loss	3–1	Homer Moore	Decision (unanimous)	RITC 34	March 15, 2002	3	3:00	Phoenix, Arizona, United States	
Win	3–0	Joey Vigueria	TKO (submission to punches)	RITC 33: The Big Show	February 2, 2002	1	2:00	Phoenix, Arizona, United States	
Win	2–0	Justin Lyon	TKO (submission to punches)	RITC 31	November 7, 2001	1	0:33	Phoenix, Arizona, United States	
Win	1–0	Ryan Roath	TKO (submission to punches)	RITC 30: Soaring to New Heights	September 26, 2001	1	2:32	Phoenix, Arizona, United States	

=== Mixed martial arts exhibition record ===
Exhibition record breakdown		
4 matches	4 wins	0 losses
By knockout	0	0
By submission	1	0
By decision	3	0

Res.	Record	Opponent	Method	Event	Date	Round	Time	Location	Notes
Win	4–0	Cole Williams	Decision (split)	Fight Master: Bellator MMA	August 29, 2013	3	5:00	New Orleans, Louisiana, United States	Semifinal bout.
Win	3–0	Evan Cutts	Decision (unanimous)	Fight Master: Bellator MMA	August 22, 2013	2	5:00	New Orleans, Louisiana, United States	Quarterfinal bout.
Win	2–0	Eric Scanlan	Decision (unanimous)	Fight Master: Bellator MMA	July 31, 2013	2	5:00	New Orleans, Louisiana, United States	Preliminary bout.
Win	1–0	Rob Mills	Submission (heel hook)	Fight Master: Bellator MMA	July 10, 2013	1	4:31	New Orleans, Louisiana, United States	Elimination bout.

== Professional boxing record ==
1 fight	0 wins	1 loss
By knockout	0	1

No.	Result	Record	Opponent	Type	Round, time	Date	Location	Notes
1	Los	0–1	Markus Perez	TKO	3 (4), 1:19	Apr 1, 2023	Fiserv Forum, Milwaukee, Wisconsin, U.S.	

== Bare-knuckle boxing record ==
Professional record breakdown
7 matches	4 wins	2 losses
By knockout	1	2
By decision	3	0
Draws	1	

Res.	Record	Opponent	Method	Event	Date	Round	Time	Location	Notes
Loss	4–2–1	Lorenzo Hunt	KO (punches)	BKFC 24	April 30, 2022	2	1:12	Great Falls, Montana, US	For the BKFC Light Heavyweight Championship.
Win	4–1–1	Melvin Guillard	KO (punch)	BKFC Fight Night Montana: Riggs vs. Guillard	October 9, 2021	1	0:59	Billings, Montana, United States	Knockout of the Year (2022).
Loss	3–1–1	Héctor Lombard	TKO (doctor stoppage)	BKFC 18	June 26, 2021	4	1:07	Miami, Florida, US	For the inaugural BKFC Cruiserweight Championship.
Draw	3–0–1	Walber Barros	Draw (unanimous)	BKFC 6	June 22, 2019	5	2:00	Tampa, Florida, US	
Win	3–0	Heriberto Tovar	Decision (unanimous)	BKFC 4	February 2, 2019	5	2:00	Cancun, Mexico	
Win	2–0	Brok Weaver	Decision (unanimous)	BKFC 3	October 20, 2018	5	2:00	Biloxi, Mississippi, US	
Win	1–0	Christian Evans	Decision (unanimous)	BKB 4	February 2017	5	2:00	London, England	Won the BKB Light Heavyweight World Championship

== See also ==
- List of Bellator MMA alumni
- List of Strikeforce alumni
- List of male mixed martial artists

Awards and achievements	Vacant Title last held by Chris Leben	2nd WEC Middleweight Champion; May 19, 2005 – December, 2006	Vacant Title next held by Paulo Filho
