= Alex Stiebling =

American mixed martial arts (MMA) fighter

- Born: December 26, 1976 (age 49); Louisville, Kentucky, United States
- Other names: The Brazilian Killa
- Height: 6 ft 2 in (1.88 m)
- Weight: 188 lb (85 kg; 13.4 st)
- Division: Heavyweight; Light Heavyweight; Middleweight
- Fighting out of: Indianapolis, Indiana, United States
- Team: Integrated Fighting
- Years active: 1999–2009

Mixed martial arts record
- Total: 32
- Wins: 19
- By knockout: 4
- By submission: 10
- By decision: 5
- Losses: 11
- By knockout: 6
- By decision: 5
- Draws: 1
- No contests: 1

Other information
- Mixed martial arts record from Sherdog

Alex Stiebling (born December 26, 1976) is a retired American professional mixed martial artist. A professional competitor from 1999 until 2009, he competed in the PRIDE Fighting Championships, WEC, King of the Cage, BodogFIGHT, the World Fighting Alliance. He won the International Vale Tudo Championship in 2001.

== Early life ==
Stiebling grew up in Louisville, KY and graduated from Trinity High School in 1995. As a senior, he finished as runner-up in the 160 lbs. weight class of the 1995 Kentucky high school wrestling state tournament.

== Mixed martial arts career ==
=== Early career ===
Stiebling compiled a professional record of 5–0–1 competing in the Midwestern regional circuit before facing Mark Hughes at UFC 28 on November 17, 2000. He lost via unanimous decision, but would bounce back later winning the IVC tournament in November of the next year.

=== PRIDE Fighting Championships ===
Stiebling made his PRIDE debut at PRIDE 18 against Allan Goes on December 23, 2001. He won via third-round TKO.

He next faced another Brazilian fighter in Wallid Ismail at PRIDE 19 on February 24, 2002. He won via unanimous decision. After capturing Brazil's IVC Championship and with two straight wins over notable Brazilian fighters, Stiebling received his nickname "The Brazilian Killa."

With an impressive record of 12–1–1, Stiebling fought future UFC Middleweight Champion Anderson Silva at PRIDE 21 on June 23, 2002. He lost via TKO due to a doctor stoppage at 1:23 into the first round.

Stiebling brought his losing streak to four going into his final PRIDE appearance at PRIDE 25 against Akira Shoji on March 16, 2003. He lost via controversial split decision.

=== World Extreme Cagefighting ===
Stiebling made his WEC debut at WEC 9 on January 16, 2004, against Joe Riggs. After losing the first round due to Riggs' superior striking and ground and pound technique, Stiebling was able to get a submission victory with a triangle choke in the second round.

Stiebling picked up another second-round submission via arm triangle choke over Tim McKenzie at WEC 10, bringing his winning streak to five before losing to Antônio Rogério Nogueira via unanimous decision.

Stiebling then lost his next two WEC bouts to Chael Sonnen and Vernon White, respectively. He then fought Jason Guida at WEC 22, and won via unanimous decision.

He then faced Fernando Gonzalez at WEC 23. He lost via TKO due to a doctor stoppage in the first round.

=== Independent promotions ===
Stiebling went 1–2 in his final three fights before retiring in 2009.

== Mixed martial arts record ==
Professional record breakdown
32 matches	19 wins	11 losses
By knockout	4	6
By submission	10	0
By decision	5	5
Draws	1	
No contests	1	

Res.	Record	Opponent	Method	Event	Date	Round	Time	Location	Notes
Loss	19–11–1 (1)	Murilo Rua	TKO (head kick and punches)	BC: Bitetti Combat 4	September 12, 2009	1	0:39	Rio de Janeiro, Brazil	
Loss	19–10–1 (1)	Moise Rimbon	TKO (punches)	BodogFIGHT: Costa Rica Combat	February 17, 2007	2	4:04	Costa Rica	
Win	19–9–1 (1)	Auggie Padeken	Decision (unanimous)	Extreme Wars 5: Battlegrounds	October 6, 2006	3	3:00	Honolulu, Hawaii, United States	
Loss	18–9–1 (1)	Fernando Gonzalez	TKO (doctor stoppage)	WEC 23	August 17, 2006	1	2:35	Lemoore, California, United States	
Win	18–8–1 (1)	Jason Guida	Decision (unanimous)	WEC 22	July 28, 2006	3	5:00		
Loss	17–8–1 (1)	Vernon White	KO (punch)	WEC 17	October 14, 2005	2	0:09	Lemoore, California, United States	
Loss	17–7–1 (1)	Chael Sonnen	Decision (unanimous)	WEC 12	October 21, 2004	3	5:00	Lemoore, California, United States	
Loss	17–6–1 (1)	Antônio Rogério Nogueira	Decision (unanimous)	Gladiator FC: Day 1	June 26, 2004	3	5:00	South Korea	
Win	17–5–1 (1)	Tim McKenzie	Submission (arm-triangle choke)	WEC 10	May 21, 2004	2	2:25	Lemoore, California, United States	
Win	16–5–1 (1)	Mikko Rupponen	Submission (rear-naked-choke)	FF 10: Fight Festival 10	March 20, 2004	1	4:25	Helsinki, Finland	
Win	15–5–1 (1)	Joe Riggs	Submission (triangle choke)	WEC 9	January 16, 2004	2	1:54	Lemoore, California, United States	
Win	14–5–1 (1)	Mike Rogers	Decision (unanimous)	RSF: Shooto Challenge 2	January 2, 2004	2	5:00	Belleville, Illinois, United States	
Win	13–5–1 (1)	Mikko Rupponen	Submission (choke)	FF 8: Fight Festival 8	September 1, 2003	2	5:00	Helsinki, Finland	
Loss	12–5–1 (1)	Akira Shoji	Decision (split)	PRIDE 25	March 16, 2003	3	5:00	Yokohama, Kanagawa	
Loss	12–4–1 (1)	Marvin Eastman	KO (punch)	WFA 3: Level 3	November 23, 2002	1	1:07	Las Vegas, Nevada, United States	
Loss	12–3–1 (1)	Yuki Sasaki	Decision (unanimous)	Pancrase: 2002 Anniversary Show	September 29, 2002	3	5:00	Yokohama, Kanagawa	
Loss	12–2–1 (1)	Anderson Silva	TKO (doctor stoppage)	PRIDE 21	June 23, 2002	1	1:23	Saitama, Saitama, Japan	
Win	12–1–1 (1)	Wallid Ismail	Decision (unanimous)	PRIDE 19	February 24, 2002	3	5:00	Saitama, Saitama, Japan	
Win	11–1–1 (1)	Allan Goes	TKO (knees and punches)	PRIDE 18	December 23, 2001	3	0:47	Saitama, Saitama, Japan	
Win	10–1–1 (1)	Angelo Araujo	Submission (rear-naked choke)	IVC 14: USA vs. Brazil	November 11, 2001	1	4:01	Caracas, Venezuela	
Win	9–1–1 (1)	Milton Bahia	Submission (heel hook)	IVC 14: USA vs. Brazil	November 11, 2001	1	1:07	Caracas, Venezuela	
Win	8–1–1 (1)	Leandro Ribeiro	KO (kick)	IVC 14: USA vs. Brazil	November 11, 2001	1	0:05	Caracas, Venezuela	
Win	7–1–1 (1)	Luiz Claudio das Dores	Submission (heel hook)	IVC 14: USA vs. Brazil	November 11, 2001	1	9:22	Caracas, Venezuela	
Win	6–1–1 (1)	Dennis Reed	Submission (armbar)	RSF 3: Reality Submission Fighting 3	March 30, 2001	1	3:30	Belleville, Illinois, United States	
NC	5–1–1 (1)	Sanae Kikuta	NC (accidental headbutt)	Pancrase: Proof 1	February 4, 2001	1	3:11	Tokyo, Japan	
Loss	5–1–1	Mark Hughes	Decision (unanimous)	UFC 28	November 17, 2000	2	5:00	Atlantic City, New Jersey, United States	
Win	5–0–1	Kai Hansen	Submission (heel hook)	HOOKnSHOOT: Driven	September 16, 2000	0	0:00	Evansville, Indiana, United States	
Win	4–0–1	Louis Burgette	TKO (submission to punches)	HOOKnSHOOT: Double Fury 1	March 17, 2000	0	N/A	Evansville, Indiana, United States	
Win	3–0–1	August Porquet	Decision (unanimous)	HOOKnSHOOT: Beyond	September 10, 1999	1	15:00	Evansville, Indiana, United States	
Win	2–0–1	Roberto Ramirez	Submission (ankle lock)	HOOKnSHOOT: Breakout	Jul 24, 1999	1	11:43	Evansville, Indiana, United States	
Draw	1–0–1	Jeremy Morrison	Draw	RITC 3: Rage in the Cage (Indiana) 3	June 26, 1999	1	0:00	Evansville, Indiana, United States	
Win	1–0	Furman Long	TKO	WPC: Rage in the Cage	April 3, 1999	0	0:00	Evansville, Indiana, United States	
