= Serra-Longo Fight Team =

Martial arts team based in New York

- Founded by: Matt Serra; Ray Longo
- Primary owners: Matt Serra; Ray Longo
- Primary trainers: Matt Serra; Ray Longo; Chris Weidman
- Past titleholders: Matt Serra; Chris Weidman; Aljamain Sterling; Merab Dvalishvili
- Training facilities: Long Island, New York, U.S.
- Website: Serra BJJ Academy; Longo-Weidman MMA

Serra-Longo Fight Team is a mixed martial arts team based on Long Island, New York that was formed by Matt Serra and Ray Longo. The team has two gyms operating under it, Serra BJJ Academy and Longo-Weidman MMA. It has produced four UFC champions, Matt Serra (former UFC Welterweight Champion), Chris Weidman (former UFC Middleweight Champion), Aljamain Sterling (former UFC Bantamweight Champion) and Merab Dvalishvili (former UFC Bantamweight Champion).

== Overview ==
When Matt Serra was 17, he met Ray Longo at Oishi Judo gym in New York City and the two became friends. Longo was an accountant who owned a gym and would train fighters at night. The two formed a team where Serra was an MMA fighter and Longo would act as the coach where he organized and provided all the resources needed to help Serra win his fights. The crowning achievement of the team was in 2007 where Serra defeated Georges St-Pierre at UFC 69 in one of the biggest upsets to become UFC Welterweight Champion.

The team has expanded in size and currently operates two gyms, Serra BJJ Academy and Longo-Weidman MMA.

Serra BJJ is a Brazilian Jiu Jitsu gym founded by Matt Serra in 2001 and is currently based in Huntington, New York. Serra acts as the head instructor sharing his experience as the first American to be awarded a Black Belt by Renzo Gracie and a 2001 ADCC Silver Medalist.

Longo-Weidman MMA (LAW MMA) is a mixed martial arts gym based in Garden City, New York and is currently owned by Ray Longo and Chris Weidman. Previously named Ray Longo's International Martial Arts Academy, it was originally founded in 1990 by Longo. Longo is the head instructor. He is a certified instructor of Bruce Lee's Jeet Kun Do Concepts and focuses mainly on the striking aspect. Chris Weidman is a Former UFC Middleweight Champion who was also coached by Longo to defeat Anderson Silva in an upset at UFC 162 in 2013.

== Notable fighters ==
- Matt Serra
- Chris Weidman
- Aljamain Sterling
- Merab Dvalishvili
- Al Iaquinta
- Itsuki Hirata
- Gian Villante
- Matt Frevola
- Ulka Sasaki
- Eddie Gordon
- Pete Sell
- Mizuki Inoue
- Nazim Sadykhov

== See also ==
- List of professional MMA training camps
