= 2007 in Palace Fighting Championship =

Information
- First date: January 18, 2007
- Last date: November 10, 2007

Events
- Total events: 5

Fights
- Total fights: 64

Chronology
| 2007 in Palace Fighting Championship | 2008 in PFC |

The year 2007 is the 1st year in the history of Palace Fighting Championship, a mixed martial arts promotion based in the United States. In 2007 PFC held 5 events beginning with, PFC 1: King of the Ring.

== Events list ==
| No. | Event | Date | Venue | Location |
|---|---|---|---|---|
| 5 | PFC 5: Beatdown at 4 Bears | November 10, 2007 | 4 Bears Casino and Lodge | New Town, North Dakota |
| 4 | PFC 4: Project Complete | October 18, 2007 | Tachi Palace | Lemoore, California |
| 3 | PFC 3: Step Up | July 19, 2007 | Tachi Palace | Lemoore, California |
| 2 | PFC 2: Fast and Furious | March 22, 2007 | Tachi Palace | Lemoore, California |
| 1 | PFC 1: King of the Ring | January 18, 2007 | Tachi Palace | Lemoore, California |

== PFC 1: King of the Ring ==
PFC 1: King of the Ring was an event held on January 18, 2007 at the Tachi Palace in Lemoore, California, United States.

=== Results ===
Main Card
| Weight class | | | | Method | Round | Time | Notes |
|---|---|---|---|---|---|---|---|
| | Eric Esch | def. | Charles Hodges | KO (Punch) | 1 | 0:45 |
| | Poppies Martinez | def. | Josh Gardner | Decision (Unanimous) | 3 | 3:00 |
| | Kenny Ento | def. | Roy Arriola | TKO (Punches) | 1 | 0:31 |
| | Sean Dias | def. | Brandon Jinnies | TKO (Punches) | 1 | 1:36 |
| | Chris Botelho | vs. | Josh McCartney | No Contest | 2 | 0:00 |
| | Ralph Lopez | def. | Shahob Nasrabadi | TKO (Punches) | 1 | 1:15 |
| | Mike Moreno | def. | Francisco Magallon | KO | 1 | 0:37 |
| | Rafael del Real | def. | Rolando Torres | Submission (Armbar) | 3 | 2:08 |
| | Andrew Martinez | def. | Billy Terry | Decision (Unanimous) | 3 | 3:00 |
| | Tommy Contreras | def. | Brian Huerta | TKO (Punches) | 3 | 0:00 |
| | David Espinosa | def. | Nelson Ocampo | Submission (Rear Naked Choke) | 2 | 0:00 |

== PFC 2: Fast and Furious ==
PFC 2: Fast and Furious was an event held on March 22, 2007 at the Tachi Palace in Lemoore, California, United States.

=== Results ===
Main Card
| Weight class | | | | Method | Round | Time | Notes |
|---|---|---|---|---|---|---|---|
| | Lodune Sincaid | def. | Kenny Ento | TKO (Punches) | 2 | 2:09 |
| | Scott Smith | def. | Troy Miller | TKO (Doctor Stoppage) | 1 | 1:06 |
| | Van Palacio | vs. | Wes Sims | No Contest | 1 | 0:54 |
| | Shad Smith | def. | Poppies Martinez | Submission (Guillotine Choke) | 3 | 1:10 |
| | Rani Yahya | def. | Louie Moreno | Submission (Guillotine Choke) | 1 | 0:23 |
| | Sean Dias | def. | Giovanni Encarnacion | Submission (Guillotine Choke) | 1 | 1:04 |
| | Vince Lucero | def. | Mike Dexter | KO (Punches) | 1 | 0:36 |
| | Richie Hightower | def. | Andy Maccarone | KO (Elbow) | 1 | 0:36 |
| | Lamont Lister | def. | Rafael del Real | Decision (Split) | 3 | 3:00 |
| | David Espinosa | def. | Ed Tomaselli | TKO (Punches) | 1 | 1:52 |
| | Jimmy Dexter | def. | Eli Moreno | TKO (Punches) | 1 | 1:18 |
| | Morris Aldaco | def. | Doug Hunt | TKO (Punches) | 3 | 2:17 |
| | Mike Cook | def. | Scott Wimmer | TKO (Punches) | 2 | 0:17 |
| | Mike Martinez | def. | Tommy Contreras | Decision (Unanimous) | 3 | 3:00 |
| | Darren Crisp | def. | Scott Brommage | KO (Head Kick) | 1 | 1:35 |

== PFC 3: Step Up ==
PFC 3: Step Up was an event held on July 19, 2007 at the Tachi Palace in Lemoore, California, United States.

=== Results ===
Main Card
| Weight class | | | | Method | Round | Time | Notes |
|---|---|---|---|---|---|---|---|
| | Rolando Velasco | def. | Jason Georgianna | Decision (Unanimous) | 3 | 3:00 |
| | Scott Brommage | def. | Elvis Franco | Submission (Ankle Lock) | 1 | 2:04 |
| | Jeremy Freitag | def. | Lamont Lister | Decision (Unanimous) | 3 | 3:00 |
| | Chris Botelho | def. | Josh McCartney | Decision (Unanimous) | 3 | 3:00 |
| | Cleverson Dezonet | def. | Rolando Jaime | Submission (Guillotine Choke) | 1 | 2:17 |
| | Sean Dias | def. | Aaron Maldonado | Submission (Rear-Naked Choke) | 4 | 2:45 |
| | Casey Olson | def. | Brandon Jinnies | Decision (Unanimous) | 3 | 3:00 |
| | Seth Dikun | def. | Angelo Antuna | Submission (Rear-Naked Choke) | 2 | 2:20 |
| | Mark Muñoz | def. | Austin Achorn | TKO (Punches) | 1 | 1:25 |
| | Shawn Klarcyk | def. | David Espinosa | Decision (Split) | 5 | 3:00 |
| | Ruben Villareal | def. | Rafael del Real | Submission (Kimura) | 1 | 2:18 |
| | Mike Cook | def. | Rolando Torres | KO (Punch) | 1 | 0:12 |
| | Mike Martinez | def. | Robert Breslin | Decision (Unanimous) | 3 | 3:00 |
| | Dewey Cooper | def. | Adam Smith | Decision (Unanimous) | 3 | 3:00 |
| | Kenny Ento | def. | Joel Crawford | Submission (Armbar) | 1 | 1:31 |
| | Mario Rivera | def. | Joe Chaidez | Decision (Unanimous) | 3 | 3:00 |
| | Ralph Lopez | def. | Marcus Blood | Submission (Punches) | 3 | 1:43 |

== PFC 4: Project Complete ==
PFC 4: Project Complete was an event held on October 18, 2007 at the Tachi Palace in Lemoore, California, United States.

=== Results ===
Main Card
| Weight class | | | | Method | Round | Time | Notes |
|---|---|---|---|---|---|---|---|
| | Thomas Denny | def. | Olaf Alfonso | Decision (Unanimous) | 3 | 3:00 |
| | Mark Muñoz | def. | Tony Rubalcava | Decision (Unanimous) | 3 | 3:00 |
| | Kenny Ento | def. | Justin Levens | Submission (Triangle Choke) | 1 | 2:15 |
| | Jorge Evangelista | def. | Vernon Phillips | KO (Head Kick) | 1 | 2:53 |
| | Nate Loughran | def. | Brian Warren | Submission (Rear Naked Choke) | 1 | 2:39 |
| | Mike Martinez | def. | Rocky Molina | TKO (Punches) | 2 | 2:53 |
| | Poppies Martinez | def. | Brandon Jinnies | TKO (Punches) | 1 | 1:23 |
| | Mike Moreno | def. | Chrayondray Johnson | KO (Head Kick) | 1 | 0:20 |
| | Jimmy Dexter | def. | Dewey Cooper | Decision (Unanimous) | 3 | 3:00 |
| | Jeremy Luchau | def. | Michael Satumbaga | Submission (Rear Naked Choke) | 1 | 1:21 |
| | Jeremy Freitag | def. | Lodune Sincaid | Decision (Split) | 5 | 3:00 |
| | Luis Gonzalez | def. | Josh Beasnette | TKO (Punches) | 1 | 0:43 |
| | Phil Collins | def. | Marc De La Cruz | TKO (Punches) | 3 | 0:58 |

== PFC 5: Beatdown at 4 Bears ==
PFC 5: Beatdown at 4 Bears was held on November 10, 2007 at the 4 Bears Casino and Lodge in New Town, North Dakota.

=== Results ===
Main Card
| Weight class | | | | Method | Round | Time | Notes |
|---|---|---|---|---|---|---|---|
| | Brad Imes | def. | Chris Blaire | TKO (Punches) | 1 | 4:13 |
| | Poppies Martinez | def. | Aaron Maldonado | Submission (Guillotine Choke) | 1 | 1:22 |
| | Vance North | def. | Mike Craddock | Submission (Armlock) | 1 | 1:24 |
| | Zach Thumb | def. | Chris Galliher | TKO (Punches) | 1 | 0:18 |
| | Chris Hugh | def. | Russell Dietiene | Decision (Unanimous) | 3 | 3:00 |
| | Eric Pribble | def. | Jimmy Dexter | Submission (Guillotine Choke) | 2 | 0:46 |
| | Mike Gates | def. | Lucas Sinclair | Submission (Armbar) | 1 | 0:57 |
| | Author Cook | def. | Aaron Alvord | KO (Punch) | 1 | 0:23 |

== See also ==
- Palace Fighting Championship
