= UFC 168 =

UFC mixed martial arts event in 2013

UFC 168: Weidman vs. Silva 2
- The poster for UFC 168: Weidman vs. Silva 2
- Promotion: Ultimate Fighting Championship
- Date: December 28, 2013
- Venue: MGM Grand Garden Arena
- City: Las Vegas, Nevada
- Attendance: 15,650
- Total gate: $6,238,792
- Buyrate: 1,025,000

Event chronology
UFC on Fox: Johnson vs. Benavidez 2	UFC 168: Weidman vs. Silva 2	UFC Fight Night: Saffiedine vs. Lim

UFC 168: Weidman vs. Silva 2 was a mixed martial arts event held on December 28, 2013, at the MGM Grand Garden Arena in Las Vegas, Nevada.

== Background ==
The event was headlined by a UFC Middleweight Championship rematch between current champion Chris Weidman and former champion Anderson Silva. The two previously met at UFC 162, with Weidman winning via KO in the second round and earning the title.

Co-featured was a UFC Women's Bantamweight Championship bout between current champion Ronda Rousey and Miesha Tate. The two met before under the Strikeforce banner in 2012 with Rousey winning via first round submission. This served as the coaches bout for The Ultimate Fighter 18.

Initially, it was announced that Rousey would face top contender Cat Zingano at this event, after Zingano defeated Tate at The Ultimate Fighter 17 Finale. However, Zingano was pulled from the bout, and subsequently as coach for The Ultimate Fighter, after it was announced that she had suffered a knee injury and would be sidelined for several months. Tate was tabbed as the replacement and the rematch with Rousey was announced.

Shane del Rosario was expected to face Guto Inocente at the event, but both men pulled out of the bout, citing injuries. On November 26, 2013, del Rosario had two sudden heart attacks and died on December 9, 2013.

Diego Brandão weighed in seven pounds over the featherweight limit of 146 lb. Brandão re-weighed and was 151.5, but was still fined 25% of his purse for missing weight.

== Results ==
Main card
Weight class				Method	Round	Time	Notes
Middleweight	Chris Weidman (c)	def.	Anderson Silva	TKO (leg injury)	2	1:16	(Note: For the UFC Middleweight Championship.)
Women's Bantamweight	Ronda Rousey (c)	def.	Miesha Tate	Submission (armbar)	3	0:58	(Note: For the UFC Women's Bantamweight Championship.)
Heavyweight	Travis Browne	def.	Josh Barnett	KO (elbows)	1	1:00
Lightweight	Jim Miller	def.	Fabrício Camões	Submission (armbar)	1	3:42
Catchweight (151.5 lb)	Dustin Poirier	def.	Diego Brandão	KO (punches)	1	4:54
Preliminary card (Fox Sports 1)
Middleweight	Uriah Hall	def.	Chris Leben	TKO (retirement)	1	5:00	(Note: This bout aired on the broadcast following the Browne vs Barnett bout.)
Lightweight	Michael Johnson	def.	Gleison Tibau	KO (punches)	2	1:32	(Note: This bout aired on the broadcast following the Miller vs Camoes bout.)
Featherweight	Dennis Siver	vs.	Manny Gamburyan	No Contest (overturned)	3	5:00	(Note: Originally ruled a unanimous decision (29–28, 29–28, 29–28) victory for Siver, the result was changed to "No Contest" after Siver tested positive for a banned substance during a post fight screening.)
Welterweight	John Howard	def.	Siyar Bahadurzada	Decision (unanimous) (30–27, 30–27, 30–27)	3	5:00
Preliminary card (Online)
Welterweight	William Macário	def.	Bobby Voelker	Decision (unanimous) (30–27, 30–27, 30–27)	3	5:00
Featherweight	Robbie Peralta	def.	Estevan Payan	KO (punches)	3	0:12

== Bonus awards ==
The following fighters received $75,000 bonuses.

- Fight of The Night: Ronda Rousey vs. Miesha Tate
- Knockout of The Night: Travis Browne
- Submission of the Night: Ronda Rousey

== Reported payout ==
The following is the reported payout to the fighters as reported to the Nevada State Athletic Commission. It does not include sponsor money and also does not include the UFC's traditional "fight night" bonuses.

- Chris Weidman: $500,000 (includes $200,000 win bonus) def. Anderson Silva: $600,000
- Ronda Rousey: $100,000 (includes $50,000 win bonus) def. Miesha Tate: $28,000
- Travis Browne: $56,000 (includes $28,000 win bonus) def. Josh Barnett: $170,000
- Jim Miller: $92,000 (includes $46,000 win bonus) def. Fabricio Camoes: $8,000
- Dustin Poirier: $46,000 (includes $23,000 win bonus) def. Diego Brandao: $20,000^
- Uriah Hall: $20,000 (includes $10,000 win bonus) def. Chris Leben: $51,000
- Michael Johnson: $36,000 (includes $18,000 win bonus) def. Gleison Tibau: $39,000
- Dennis Siver: $66,000 (includes $33,000 win bonus) def. Manvel Gamburyan: $25,000
- John Howard: $32,000 (includes $16,000 win bonus) def. Siyar Bahadurzada: $17,000
- William Macario: $20,000 (includes $10,000 win bonus) def. Bobby Voelker: $12,000
- Robert Peralta: $24,000 (includes $12,000 win bonus) def. Estevan Payan: $10,000

^ Although not recognized on the official pay sheet, Brandao was fined 25% of his base pay ($5,000) for missing weight for the fight, half of that money went to NSAC and half to Poirier.

== See also ==
- List of UFC events
- 2013 in UFC
- Miesha Tate vs. Ronda Rousey
