= Ray Longo =

Mixed martial arts trainer

- Born: May 20, 1958 (age 68); Astoria, Queens, U.S.
- Team: Serra-Longo Fight Team

Other information
- University: St. John's University

Ray Longo is a mixed martial arts (MMA) coach, stunt man and actor. Considered one of the top coaches in MMA, he is the head coach of the Serra-Longo fight team. He has trained and cornered four UFC Champions: Matt Serra, Chris Weidman, Aljamain Sterling and the former bantamweight champion Merab Dvalishvili.

== Background ==
Longo graduated from St. John’s University in 1980 with a Bachelor of Science in Accountancy and began working full time as an accountant while training a few fighters by night. After meeting Matt Serra, they formed the Serra-Longo fight team.

As a striking coach, Longo takes extra precautions regarding fighter's health, including concussions. He is a certified instructor of Bruce Lee's Jeet Kun Do Concepts.

Longo was a 2015 World MMA Awards Coach of The Year nominee.
