= Lodune Sincaid =

American mixed martial artist (1973–2019)

- Born: Lodune Ki Sincaid; May 7, 1973; Saint Paul, Minnesota, U.S.
- Died: c. April 7, 2019 (aged 45); St. Petersburg, Florida
- Other names: The Vanilla Gorilla
- Height: 5 ft 9 in (1.75 m)
- Weight: 205 lb (93 kg; 14.6 st)
- Division: Heavyweight; Light Heavyweight; Middleweight
- Stance: Orthodox
- Fighting out of: Clearwater, Florida
- Years active: 2001–2010

Mixed martial arts record
- Total: 24
- Wins: 15
- By knockout: 5
- By submission: 9
- By decision: 1
- Losses: 9
- By knockout: 6
- By submission: 1
- By decision: 2

Other information
- Mixed martial arts record from Sherdog

Lodune Ki Sincaid (May 7, 1973 – April 7, 2019) was an American professional mixed martial artist. He was WEC Light Heavyweight Champion in 2006, and was featured on the UFC's The Ultimate Fighter 1 reality show, losing to Bobby Southworth by knockout in the first elimination match of the season. He also competed in the World Fighting Alliance and Palace Fighting Championship.

== Mixed martial arts career ==
=== Early career ===
Sincaid made his professional debut in 2001 fighting in small promotions, and started off his career dominating his opponents, achieving a 6–0 record with all of the wins coming by submission or knockout.

=== The Ultimate Fighter ===
The UFC had been following Sincaid's career closely and invited him to compete on the first-ever Ultimate Fighter. He fought for Team Couture, led by Randy Couture, and was eliminated by future Strikeforce Light Heavyweight Champion Bobby Southworth by knockout in the first elimination match.

Sincaid was handed his first professional loss at The Ultimate Fighter 1 Finale against future UFC Middleweight Championship contender Nate Quarry, via TKO due to punches.

=== WEC ===
Sincaid made his debut in the WEC against former WEC Heavyweight Champion James Irvin. Sincaid won the bout via unanimous decision and was then offered an opportunity to fight for the WEC Light Heavyweight Championship at WEC 20, and won by a rear-naked choke submission, becoming the new WEC Light Heavyweight Champion.

Sincaid then lost his next two fights, the first being against Jason "Mayhem" Miller at WFA: King of the Streets by a rear-naked choke submission and then in his next fight Sincaid lost the WEC Light Heavyweight Championship belt to Doug Marshall by knockout. After his fight with Miller, it was revealed that Sincaid tested positive for marijuana.

=== Post-WEC ===
After the demise of the WEC, Sincaid appeared in the Palace Fighting Championship organization as well as other small organizations.

== Personal life ==
Sincaid publicly spoke about his struggle with PTSD from the military and genetic bipolar disorder.

On April 11, 2019, news surfaced that Lodune had been found dead in his apartment on April 7, 2019.

== Championships and accomplishments ==
- World Extreme Cagefighting
  - WEC Light Heavyweight Championship (One time)

== Mixed martial arts record ==
Professional record breakdown
24 matches	15 wins	9 losses
By knockout	5	6
By submission	9	1
By decision	1	2

Res.	Record	Opponent	Method	Event	Date	Round	Time	Location	Notes
Loss	15–9	Givanildo Santana	TKO (punches)	CCS: Collision in the Cage	March 20, 2010	3	4:27	Irvine, California, United States	
Loss	15–8	Eric Davila	TKO (punches)	Adrenaline: Feel the Rush	July 25, 2009	3	1:15	San Angelo, Texas, United States	
Win	15–7	Larry Hopkins	Submission (punches)	Steele Cage MMA: Battle of the Texas Titans	June 11, 2009	1	N/A	Frisco, Texas, United States	
Loss	14–7	Cyrille Diabaté	TKO (punches)	PFC 12: High Stakes	January 22, 2009	2	1:15	Lemoore, California, United States	
Win	14–6	Kyle Keeney	TKO (punches)	CageSport MMA	November 29, 2008	1	4:58	Tacoma, Washington, United States	
Win	13–6	Rafael Real	Submission (guillotine choke)	PFC 8: A Night of Champions	May 8, 2008	1	1:03	Lemoore, California, United States	
Loss	12–6	Cory Devela	Decision (unanimous)	Seasons Beatings 21	December 22, 2007	3	5:00	Portland, Oregon, United States	Middleweight bout.
Loss	12–5	Jeremy Freitag	Decision (split)	Palace Fighting Championship: Project Complete	October 18, 2007	3	5:00		
Win	12–4	Rob Wince	KO (knee)	King of Kombat: King of Kombat	September 7, 2007	1	3:10	Austin, Texas, United States	
Win	11–4	Robert Hunsperger	Submission (rear-naked choke)	NLF: No Limits Fighting	August 11, 2007	1	1:31		
Win	10–4	Kenny Ento	TKO (punches)	PFC 2: Fast and Furious	March 22, 2007	2	2:09	Lemoore, California, United States	
Loss	9–4	Doug Marshall	KO (punches)	WEC 23: Hot August Fights	August 17, 2006	2	:51	Lemoore, California, United States	Lost the WEC Light Heavyweight Championship
Loss	9–3	Jason Miller	Submission (rear-naked choke)	WFA: King of the Streets	July 22, 2006	1	4:29	Los Angeles, California, United States	Sincaid tested positive for marijuana
Win	9–2	Dan Molina	Submission (rear-naked choke)	WEC 20: Cinco de Mayhem	May 5, 2006	1	3:17	Lemoore, California, United States	Won the vacant WEC Light Heavyweight Championship
Win	8–2	James Irvin	Decision (unanimous)	WEC 19: Undisputed	March 17, 2006	3	5:00	Lemoore, California, United States	
Win	7–2	Alex Schoenauer	Submission (choke)	SportFight 14: Resolution	January 6, 2006	1	3:40	Portland, Oregon, United States	Return to Light Heavyweight.
Loss	6–2	Kyacey Uscola	TKO (corner stoppage)	X Fighting Championships: Dome of Destruction 3	October 15, 2005	2	3:20	Tacoma, Washington, United States	
Loss	6–1	Nate Quarry	TKO (punches)	The Ultimate Fighter 1 Finale	April 9, 2005	1	3:17	Las Vegas, Nevada, United States	
Win	6–0	David Avilla	TKO (punches)	Universal Above Ground Fighting: Ultimate Cage Fighting 4	October 12, 2003	1		Upland, California, United States	Middleweight debut.
Win	5–0	Doug Sauer	Submission (guillotine choke)	Reality Submission Fighting: Shooto Challenge	October 3, 2003	1	3:50	Belleville, Illinois, United States	
Win	4–0	Nate Schroeder	Submission (keylock)	Universal Above Ground Fighting: Ultimate Cage Fighting 3	February 15, 2003	1	N/A	Hollywood, California, United States	Heavyweight bout.
Win	3–0	Kelly English	KO	Kage Kombat	April 6, 2002	1		Los Angeles, California, United States	
Win	2–0	Shawn Menendes	Submission	Kage Kombat	October 4, 2001	1		California, United States	
Win	1–0	Jason Miller	Submission (keylock)	Reality Submission Fighting 2	January 5, 2001	1	3:46		

Vacant Title last held by Scott Smith	4th WEC Light Heavyweight Champion; May 5, 2006 – August 17, 2006	Succeeded by Doug Marshall
