= Palace Fighting Championship =

MMA promoter based in United States

- Type: Mixed Martial Arts Organization
- Industry: Mixed martial arts promotion
- Founded: 2007
- Founder: Christian Printup
- Headquarters: Lemoore, CA, United States
- Website: http://www.palacefightingchampionship.com/

Palace Fighting Championship (PFC) was a mixed martial arts (MMA) organization based in the United States that was created in 2007 by Christian Printup. It ceased operations in 2009.

In 2001, Printup helped promotional newcomers Reed Harris and Scott Adams develop the World Extreme Cage Fighting (WEC) organization through his position as Director of Entertainment at the Tachi Palace Hotel & Casino in Lemoore, California. The WEC almost exclusively presented their events at the casino venue. Printup co-produced and promoted the first 23 WEC events and is considered one of the driving forces in the growth of mixed martial arts in California. Printup also traveled with the WEC to other venues to help coordinate shows that did not take place in Lemoore.

Also a veteran concert & boxing promoter, Printup was the recipient of the Promoter of the Year award for his achievements in promoting women's boxing by the World Boxing Council (WBC) and North American Boxing Federation (NABF) in 2007 and 2008. He handled the careers of multiple World Champions including, Jenifer "All American" Alcorn, Carina "La Reina: Moreno, and Jessica "Ragin'" Rakoczy taking them from prospects to multiple world championships.

In April 2013, Printup and long-time business associate George Chung cut a deal with Bob Arum's Top Rank Boxing to serve as co-promoters and bring Floyd Mayweather to Fresno California to fight Victoriano Sosa live on HBO. Miguel Cotto was the Co-Main event attraction and a women's showdown between Jenifer Alcorn and Mia St. John rounded out the historic event.

When Harris and Adams sold the WEC to Zuffa the parent company of the Ultimate Fighting Championship in December 2006, Printup immediately filled the void by creating the Palace Fighting Championship in January, 2007. Viewed as a minor circuit, Palace Fighting Championship featured up and coming MMA stars of the Central Valley and state of California. PFC is known to host events almost exclusively at Tachi Palace. Some notable PFC competitors included eventual UFC competitors such as, Brian Cobb, Joseph Benavidez, Evan Dunham, Mark Muñoz, Chad Mendes, Michael McDonald, Cole Escovedo, among a host of others. PFC events were broadcast in the Western United States on Comcast Sports Net.

Printup also gained notoriety as the first promoter to create a dedicated Flyweight (125 lb) division in North America. The UFC then followed suit years later.

In July 2009, Palace Fighting Championship stopped operating events at Tachi Palace, severing a longstanding relationship. The promotion’s web site was shut down.

In October 2009. Printup announced that he has joined a new company ESMG World, INC with undisclosed partners and that their new venture Fight Night to the Playboy Mansion will begin operation in 2010. ESMG intends to license the Playboy Playmate dancers and stage mixed martial arts, boxing and muay thai events worldwide with Playboy models, music and cross-promotions as part of the event.

Printup is also well known as being a co-producer of Fight Night at the Playboy Mansion events with his long-time partner George Chung as well as creating his own signature events such as "The Sacred Circus: The World's First Ever Tattoo, Music, MMA, and Bikini Oil Wrestling Carnival" "W.O.W.- Women's Oil Wrestling" and "So You Think You Can Fight? An amateur kickboxing promotion.

In 2012, Printup joined the Viacom owned Bellator MMA organization as the Director of Fight Operations. In 2013, Printup was promoted to Executive Director of Venue Relations & Fight Operations for Bellator MMA.

== Events ==
The first event, PFC 1: King of the Ring, took place on January 18, 2007. As of PFC 13: Validation, which took place May 8, 2009, there have been 19 PFC events held in 3 cities and within two U.S. states.

| # | Event title | Date | Arena | Location |
|---|---|---|---|---|
| 19 | PFC 13: Validation | May 8, 2009 | Tachi Palace | Lemoore, California |
| 18 | PFC: Best of Both Worlds 2 | April 23, 2009 | Tachi Palace | Lemoore, California |
| 17 | PFC: Best of Both Worlds | February 6, 2009 | Tachi Palace | Lemoore, California |
| 16 | PFC 12: High Stakes | January 22, 2009 | Tachi Palace | Lemoore, California |
| 15 | PFC 11: All In | November 20, 2008 | Tachi Palace | Lemoore, California |
| 14 | PFC: Martinez vs. Lorenz | October 23, 2008 | Tachi Palace | Lemoore, California |
| 13 | PFC 10: Explosive | September 26, 2008 | Tachi Palace | Lemoore, California |
| 12 | PFC: Bias vs. Blood | August 21, 2008 | Tachi Palace | Lemoore, California |
| 11 | PFC 9: The Return | July 7, 2008 | Tachi Palace | Lemoore, California |
| 10 | PFC 8: A Night of Champions | May 8, 2008 | Tachi Palace | Lemoore, California |
| 9 | PFC 7.5: New Blood | April 26, 2008 | Eagle Mountain Casino | Porterville, California |
| 8 | PFC 7: Palace Fighting Championship 7 | March 20, 2008 | Tachi Palace | Lemoore, California |
| 7 | PFC: Olson vs. Alfonso | February 29, 2008 | Tachi Palace | Lemoore, California |
| 6 | PFC 6: No Retreat, No Surrender | January 17, 2008 | Tachi Palace | Lemoore, California |
| 5 | PFC 5: Beatdown at 4 Bears | November 10, 2007 | 4 Bears Casino and Lodge | New Town, North Dakota |
| 4 | PFC 4: Project Complete | October 18, 2007 | Tachi Palace | Lemoore, California |
| 3 | PFC 3: Step Up | July 19, 2007 | Tachi Palace | Lemoore, California |
| 2 | PFC 2: Fast and Furious | March 22, 2007 | Tachi Palace | Lemoore, California |
| 1 | PFC 1: King of the Ring | January 18, 2007 | Tachi Palace | Lemoore, California |

== Current champions ==
- Flyweight Champion (115 - 125 lb.): Pat Runez
- Bantamweight Champion (125 - 135 lb.): Jeff Bedard
- Featherweight Champion (135 - 145 lb): Diego Saraiva
- Lightweight Champion (145 - 155 lb.): Carlo Prater
- Welterweight Champion (161 - 170 lb.): Kyle Pimentel
- Middleweight Champion (170 - 185 lb.): Vacant
- Light Heavyweight Champion (185 - 205 lb.): Jorge Oliveira
- Heavyweight Champion (205 - 265 lb.): Vacant
