= Mark Muñoz =

American mixed martial arts fighter (born 1978)

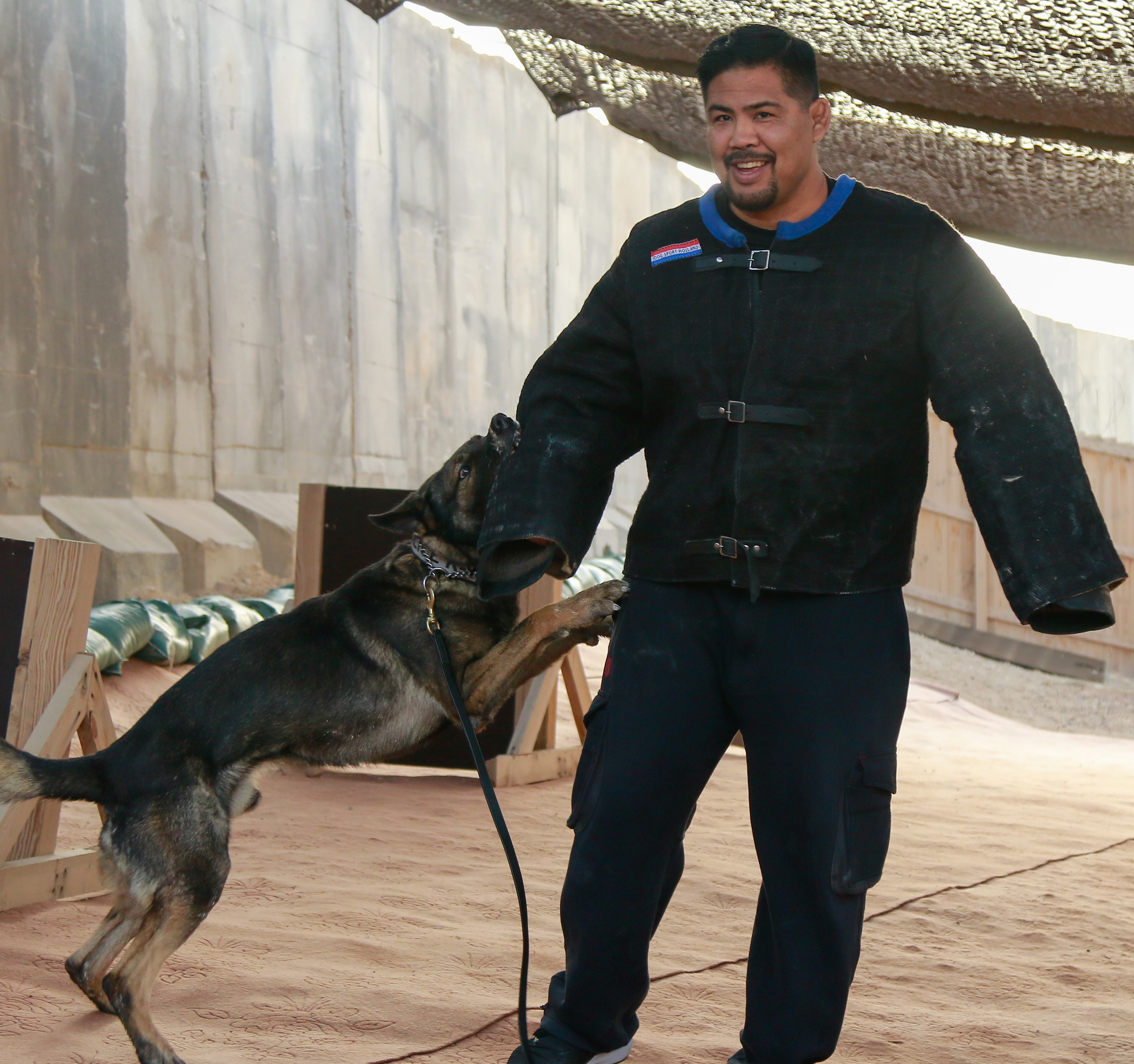
- Muñoz in bite suit at Al Asad Air Base, Iraq, in 2018
- Born: February 9, 1978 (age 48); Yokosuka, Japan
- Other names: The Filipino Wrecking Machine
- Nationality: American and Filipino
- Height: 6 ft 0 in (1.83 m)
- Weight: 185 lb (84 kg; 13 st 3 lb)
- Division: Middleweight (2009–2015); Light Heavyweight (2007–2009)
- Reach: 72 in (180 cm)
- Fighting out of: Lake Forest, California, United States
- Team: Reign Training Center (2010–2015); RVCA Training Center; Gracie Jiu-Jitsu Academy
- Rank: Purple belt in Brazilian Jiu-Jitsu under Antônio Rodrigo "Minotauro" Nogueira
- Wrestling: NCAA Division I Wrestling
- Years active: 2007–2015

Mixed martial arts record
- Total: 20
- Wins: 14
- By knockout: 6
- By submission: 1
- By decision: 7
- Losses: 6
- By knockout: 3
- By submission: 2
- By decision: 1

Other information
- University: Oklahoma State University
- Mixed martial arts record from Sherdog
Medal record
Collegiate Wrestling
Representing the Oklahoma State Cowboys
NCAA Division I Championships
Gold medal – first place	2001 Iowa City	197 lb
Bronze medal – third place	2000 St. Louis	197 lb
- Last updated on: November 23, 2011

Mark Kenery Muñoz (born February 9, 1978) is a Filipino-American former professional mixed martial artist who last competed in the Middleweight division of the Ultimate Fighting Championship. A professional competitor from 2007 until 2015, Munoz also formerly competed for the World Extreme Cagefighting (WEC). Throughout his career, Munoz was credited as one of "the nicest guys in MMA" even being officially ranked as No.1 during an Episode of "UFC Tonight" due to his contributions to both the sport of MMA, and his local community through activities such as starting up and running his own gym, and heading his own "anti-bullying" campaign.

== Background ==
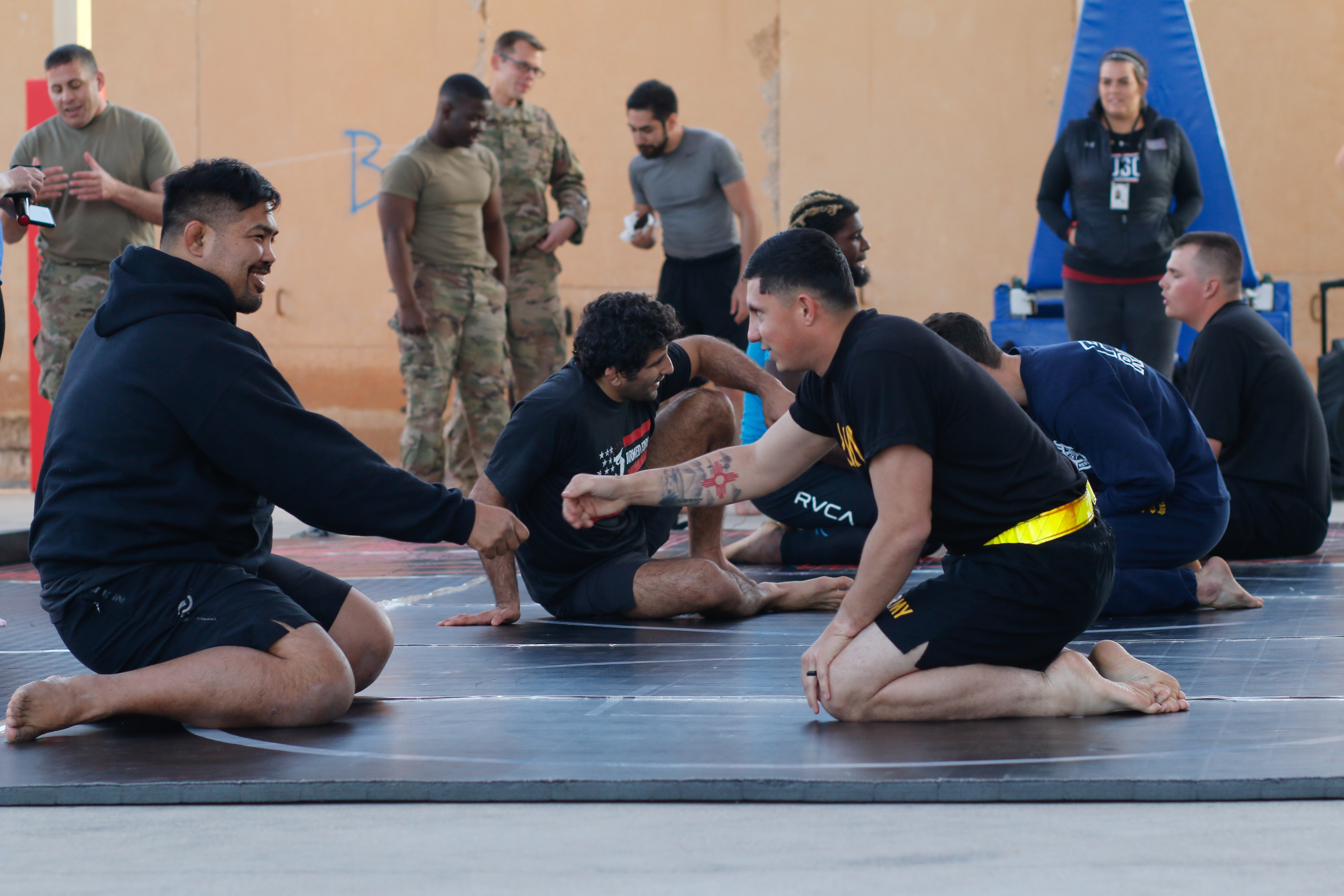
Muñoz (left) with other MMA fighters teaching service members at Al Asad Air Base, Iraq, in 2018; Beneil Dariush is at center background

Mark Kenery Muñoz was born on United States Fleet Activities Yokosuka, a United States Navy base in Yokosuka, Japan, to Filipino parents. At the age of two, Muñoz and his family relocated to Vallejo, California. Muñoz began wrestling at the age of 13 and also played football, but had to give up the latter sport when he was a sophomore in high school due to an injury. Because of his size and raw talent, Muñoz began wrestling with the varsity team at Vallejo High School. At Vallejo, Muñoz went on to be a two-time CIF state champion, an Asics First Team All-American, a 1995 national high school champion, and the 1996 NHSCA national high school champion. Muñoz was also on the honor roll for all four years and a member of the National Honors Society. That same year, Muñoz won a silver medal for the USA Junior national team and finished fifth in his weight class at the FILA Junior World Championships.

Muñoz went on to compete at Oklahoma State University, where he compiled 121 wins overall, was a two-time All-American, and won an NCAA National Championship in 2001 as a senior. Muñoz was also a three-year member of the FILA Junior World Wrestling Team, earning the silver medal in 1998. Muñoz received a Bachelor of Science degree in Health Science from Oklahoma State University, and was also a three-time member of the NWCA All-Academic Team. After finishing college, Muñoz came back to be an assistant coach at Oklahoma State for two years, leading the team to an NCAA National Championship in 2003. Muñoz then began coaching at UC Davis, before transitioning into a career in mixed martial arts.

== Mixed martial arts career ==
=== World Extreme Cagefighting ===
Muñoz made his WEC debut at WEC 34 on June 1, 2008, in the Arco Arena in Sacramento, California. Muñoz defeated Chuck Grigsby via KO (punches) at 4:15 of the first round.

Muñoz was slated to fight Steve Steinbeiss at WEC 36 on November 5, 2008, but due to an undisclosed reason he was replaced by TUF alum Alex Schoenauer.

Muñoz defeated Ricardo Barros on December 3, 2008 at the WEC's year-end event, WEC 37 via TKO (punches).

=== Ultimate Fighting Championship ===
Muñoz was one of the chosen few to be relocated from the WEC to the UFC, a sister promotion —which was also owned and produced by Zuffa—along with WEC Light Heavyweight Champion Steve Cantwell, Light Heavyweight contenders Brian Stann and Steve Steinbeiss and Middleweight contenders Chael Sonnen and Nissen Osterneck.

On March 7, 2009, Muñoz made his UFC debut at UFC 96. Muñoz suffered the first loss of his career via knockout (head kick) from Matt Hamill during the first round.

On August 29, 2009, at UFC 102, Muñoz bounced back from his first defeat and answered the critics by winning a close split decision (28–29, 30–27 and 29–28) over fellow wrestler Nick Catone.

On January 2, 2010, at UFC 108, Muñoz faced and defeated MMA veteran Ryan Jensen via first round submission due to strikes at the 2:30 mark of the first round, showcasing some vicious ground and pound.

Muñoz defeated The Ultimate Fighter 3 winner Kendall Grove on April 10, 2010, at UFC 112, by referee stoppage in the 2nd round, also winning the Fight of the Night honors.

Muñoz was defeated by Yushin Okami via split decision on August 1, 2010, at UFC Live: Jones vs. Matyushenko. In this fight, Muñoz was unable to utilize his infamous ground and pound due to Okami's ability to defend his takedowns.

Muñoz won a unanimous decision over Aaron Simpson on November 20, 2010, at UFC 123.

Muñoz defeated TUF 7 finalist CB Dollaway at UFC Live: Sanchez vs. Kampmann on March 3, 2011, via first-round KO. Muñoz landed a right hand that floored Dollaway, where he then followed up with some ground and pound which secured him the victory.

Muñoz defeated Demian Maia via unanimous decision on June 11, 2011, at UFC 131.

Muñoz defeated Chris Leben, in the first 5-round non-title fight in UFC history, on November 5, 2011, by corner stoppage at UFC 138. The stoppage was due to the ground and pound of Muñoz that opened a cut over Leben's eye, rendering him unable to see and continue the fight.

Muñoz was set to fight Chael Sonnen on January 28, 2012, at UFC on Fox: Evans vs. Davis. However, Muñoz pulled out of his fight with Sonnen on January 17, 2012, due to an injury during training and was replaced by Michael Bisping, who was pulled from a scheduled fight with Demian Maia on the same card.

Returning to action, Muñoz instead faced Chris Weidman on July 11, 2012, in the main event at UFC on Fuel TV: Munoz vs. Weidman. He lost the fight via knockout in the second round. He broke his foot during the course of the fight and was forced out of competition for a year. During his time on the sidelines, Muñoz gained a significant amount of weight.

Muñoz made his return from injury at UFC 162, where he defeated Tim Boetsch via unanimous decision.

Muñoz was expected to face Michael Bisping on October 26, 2013, at UFC Fight Night 30. However, Bisping pulled out of the bout with an eye injury and was replaced by Lyoto Machida. Munoz lost the fight via knockout in the first round.

Muñoz faced Gegard Mousasi at UFC Fight Night: Munoz vs. Mousasi on May 31, 2014 He lost via rear-naked choke submission.

On June 12, 2014 Muñoz's new four-fight contract with UFC was announced.

Muñoz was very briefly scheduled to face Caio Magalhães on February 28, 2015, at UFC 184. However, shortly after the bout was announced by the UFC, Magalhães indicated that he would not be able to compete at the event due to a lingering infection after recent dental surgery, which would require additional surgery. Muñoz stayed on the card and eventually faced returning UFC veteran Roan Carneiro. He lost the fight via technical submission in the first round.

Muñoz faced Luke Barnatt on May 16, 2015, at UFC Fight Night 66. Muñoz has indicated that win or lose, he expected this fight to be his last. Munoz dominated the fight in the stand-up and ground, winning a unanimous decision (29-28, 30-27, 30-27). Keeping his promise, an emotional Munoz took off his gloves after the fight and placed them in the center of the octagon.

== Personal life ==
Muñoz resides Mission Viejo, California with his wife and four children. He speaks fluent English and Tagalog.

Muñoz ran his own gym, Reign Training Center, in Lake Forest but in the end of April 2015, he sold it to an investor to dedicate more personal time to his children and as a wrestling coach. He was placed on administrative leave from his job as a high school wrestling coach at Fairmont Private Schools in Anaheim, California, in May 2022 amid allegations he encouraged students to settle their disputes with playground boxing matches. Muñoz issued a statement denying the allegations.

== Acting career ==
Muñoz starred in the 2020 film Lumpia with a Vengeance, in which he is also one of the co-producers.

== Championships and accomplishments ==
=== Mixed martial arts ===
- Ultimate Fighting Championship
  - Fight of the Night (One time) vs. Kendall Grove.
  - UFC.com Awards
    - 2010: Ranked #8 Fight of the Year vs. Aaron Simpson
    - 2011: Ranked #8 Fighter of the Year

=== Amateur wrestling ===
- FILA Wrestling World Championships
  - FILA World Championships Junior Freestyle 178.5 1b - 5th place (1996)
  - FILA World Championships Junior Freestyle 182.5 1b - 2nd place (1998)
- USA FILA Junior World Freestyle Championships
  - USA FILA Junior World Freestyle Championship 182.5 1b - Winner (1998)

=== Collegiate wrestling ===
- National Collegiate Athletic Association
  - NCAA Division I All-American (2000, 2001)
  - NCAA Division I 197 1b - 3rd place out of Oklahoma State University (2000)
  - NCAA Division I 197 1b - Champion out of Oklahoma State University (2001)

== Mixed martial arts record ==
Professional record breakdown
20 matches	14 wins	6 losses
By knockout	6	3
By submission	1	2
By decision	7	1

Res.	Record	Opponent	Method	Event	Date	Round	Time	Location	Notes
Win	14–6	Luke Barnatt	Decision (unanimous)	UFC Fight Night: Edgar vs. Faber	May 16, 2015	3	5:00	Pasay, Philippines	
Loss	13–6	Roan Carneiro	Technical Submission (rear-naked choke)	UFC 184	February 28, 2015	1	1:40	Los Angeles, California, United States	
Loss	13–5	Gegard Mousasi	Submission (rear-naked choke)	UFC Fight Night: Muñoz vs. Mousasi	May 31, 2014	1	3:57	Berlin, Germany	
Loss	13–4	Lyoto Machida	KO (head kick)	UFC Fight Night: Machida vs. Muñoz	October 26, 2013	1	3:10	Manchester, England	
Win	13–3	Tim Boetsch	Decision (unanimous)	UFC 162	July 6, 2013	3	5:00	Las Vegas, Nevada, United States	
Loss	12–3	Chris Weidman	KO (elbow and punches)	UFC on Fuel TV: Muñoz vs. Weidman	July 11, 2012	2	1:37	San Jose, California, United States	
Win	12–2	Chris Leben	TKO (corner stoppage)	UFC 138	November 5, 2011	2	5:00	Birmingham, England	Leben tested positive for oxycodone and oxymorphone.
Win	11–2	Demian Maia	Decision (unanimous)	UFC 131	June 11, 2011	3	5:00	Vancouver, British Columbia, Canada	
Win	10–2	C. B. Dollaway	KO (punches)	UFC Live: Sanchez vs. Kampmann	March 3, 2011	1	0:54	Louisville, Kentucky, United States	
Win	9–2	Aaron Simpson	Decision (unanimous)	UFC 123	November 20, 2010	3	5:00	Auburn Hills, Michigan, United States	
Loss	8–2	Yushin Okami	Decision (split)	UFC Live: Jones vs. Matyushenko	August 1, 2010	3	5:00	San Diego, California, United States	
Win	8–1	Kendall Grove	TKO (punches)	UFC 112	April 10, 2010	2	2:50	Abu Dhabi, United Arab Emirates	Fight of the Night.
Win	7–1	Ryan Jensen	TKO (submission to punches)	UFC 108	January 2, 2010	1	2:30	Las Vegas, Nevada, United States	
Win	6–1	Nick Catone	Decision (split)	UFC 102	August 29, 2009	3	5:00	Portland, Oregon, United States	Middleweight debut.
Loss	5–1	Matt Hamill	KO (head kick)	UFC 96	March 7, 2009	1	3:53	Columbus, Ohio, United States	
Win	5–0	Ricardo Barros	TKO (punches)	WEC 37: Torres vs. Tapia	December 3, 2008	1	2:26	Las Vegas, Nevada, United States	
Win	4–0	Chuck Grigsby	KO (punches)	WEC 34: Faber vs. Pulver	June 1, 2008	1	4:15	Sacramento, California, United States	
Win	3–0	Tony Rubalcava	Decision (unanimous)	PFC 4: Project Complete	October 18, 2007	3	3:00	Lemoore, California, United States	
Win	2–0	Mike Pierce	Decision (unanimous)	Gladiator Challenge 69: Bad Intentions	September 22, 2007	3	5:00	Sacramento, California, United States	
Win	1–0	Austin Achorn	TKO (punches)	PFC 3: Step Up	July 19, 2007	1	1:25	Lemoore, California, United States	Light Heavyweight debut.

== NCAA record ==
NCAA Championships Matches
Res.	Record	Opponent	Score	Date	Event
2001 NCAA Championships (gold) at 197 lbs
Win	12-5	Pat Quirk	5-3	March 17, 2001	2001 NCAA Division I Wrestling Championships
Win	11-5	Owen Elzen	13-9	March 17, 2001	2001 NCAA Division I Wrestling Championships
Win	10-5	Nick Preston	4-3	March 17, 2001	2001 NCAA Division I Wrestling Championships
Win	9-5	Brett Faustman	Tech Fall 21-6	March 17, 2001	2001 NCAA Division I Wrestling Championships
Win	8-5	Nik Fekete	Major 14-6	March 17, 2001	2001 NCAA Division I Wrestling Championships
2000 NCAA Championships (bronze) at 197 lbs
Win	7-5	Nick Preston	OT 8-6	March 18, 2000	2000 NCAA Division I Wrestling Championships
Loss	6-5	Zach Thompson	2-3	March 18, 2000	2000 NCAA Division I Wrestling Championships
Win	6-4	Ross Thatcher	OT 6-4	March 18, 2000	2000 NCAA Division I Wrestling Championships
Win	5-4	Dan Bednar	Major 13-5	March 18, 2000	2000 NCAA Division I Wrestling Championships
1999 NCAA Championships at 184 lbs
Loss	4-4	Andy Hrovat	OT 3-5	March 19, 1999	1999 NCAA Division I Wrestling Championships
Win	4-3	Ken Bigley	8-1	March 19, 1999	1999 NCAA Division I Wrestling Championships
Win	3-3	Scott Coleman	12-7	March 19, 1999	1999 NCAA Division I Wrestling Championships
Loss	2-3	Mike Greenfield	4-8	March 19, 1999	1999 NCAA Division I Wrestling Championships
Win	2-2	Nate Burroughs	Fall	March 19, 1999	1999 NCAA Division I Wrestling Championships
1998 NCAA Championships at 177 lbs
Loss	1-2	Jevon Herman	5-6	March 19, 1998	1998 NCAA Division I Wrestling Championships
Loss	1-1	Vertus Jones	Major 8-18	March 19, 1998	1998 NCAA Division I Wrestling Championships
Win	1-0	Brian Bowles	OT 7-5	March 19, 1998	1998 NCAA Division I Wrestling Championships

== Filmography ==
=== Film ===
Year	Title	Role	Notes
1998	The Boy Who Saved Christmas	Member of Elf Ensemble	
2012	Here Comes the Boom	Himself	
2012–2013	The Roots of Fight	Himself	
2020	Lumpia with a Vengeance	Silent Avenger / Kuya	

== See also ==
- List of current UFC fighters
- List of male mixed martial artists
