= Chris Weidman =

American mixed martial artist (born 1984)

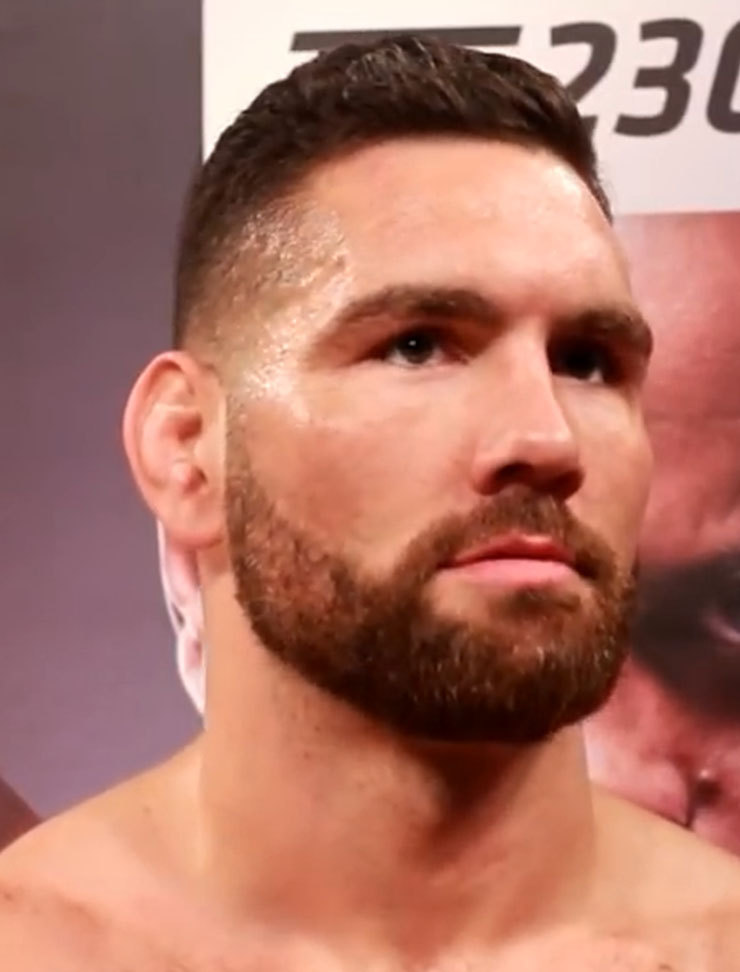
- Chris Weidman at UFC 230 in New York City in November 2018
- Born: Christopher James Weidman; June 17, 1984 (age 42); Baldwin, New York, U.S.
- Other names: The All-American
- Height: 6 ft 2 in (188 cm)
- Weight: 195 lb (88 kg; 13 st 13 lb)
- Division: Middleweight (2010–2018, 2020–2025); Light Heavyweight (2019)
- Reach: 78 in (198 cm)
- Fighting out of: Simpsonville, South Carolina, U.S.
- Team: Serra-Longo Fight Team; Renzo Gracie Academy; Ricardo Almeida BJJ; Upstate Karate (2020–present); Gym-O (2020–present)
- Trainer: Jiu-Jitsu Coach: Matt Serra/John Danaher; Striking Coach: Ray Longo/Mark Henry
- Rank: Black belt in Brazilian jiu-jitsu under Matt Serra and Renzo Gracie
- Wrestling: NCAA Division I Wrestling
- Years active: 2009–2024

Mixed martial arts record
- Total: 24
- Wins: 16
- By knockout: 6
- By submission: 4
- By decision: 6
- Losses: 8
- By knockout: 7
- By decision: 1

Other information
- University: Hofstra University
- Notable school: Baldwin Senior High School
- Mixed martial arts record from Sherdog
Medal record
Men's submission wrestling
Representing the United States
ADCC North American Championships
Gold medal – first place	2009 Los Angeles	88 kg
Men's collegiate wrestling
Representing the Hofstra Pride
NCAA Division I Championships
Bronze medal – third place	2007 Auburn Hills	197 lb

Christopher James Weidman (born June 17, 1984) is an American former professional mixed martial artist, UFC Hall of Famer, and MMA analyst. He competed in the Middleweight division of the Ultimate Fighting Championship (UFC), where he is a former UFC Middleweight Champion.

An accomplished amateur wrestler, Weidman was a two-time NJCAA All-American and a two-time NCAA Division I All-American during his collegiate career. He began his mixed martial arts career in 2008, and joined the UFC in 2011, soon amassing a 9–0 record. In 2013, Weidman came to worldwide prominence by defeating Anderson Silva to win the UFC Middleweight Championship. This ended Silva's 16-fight winning streak inside the UFC and his seven-year reign as the champion. Weidman retained the title for two and a half years, defending it three times.

== Background ==
Weidman was born in Baldwin, New York, on June 17, 1984, the second of three children. He is of German and Irish descent and was raised as a Lutheran. He and his older brother were involved in numerous athletic activities. Chris started wrestling at a very young age. With his natural athleticism, he mastered the sport very quickly. He attended Baldwin Senior High School on Long Island where he was a Nassau County and New York state wrestling champion.

A standout in college, he earned All-American wrestling honors twice at Nassau Community College before transferring to Hofstra. He became the first junior college wrestler in history to be an NYS Collegiate Champion. At Hofstra, he became a two-time NCAA Division I All-American, placing sixth at the 2006 NCAA championships his junior year and third at the 2007 NCAA's his senior year. Weidman graduated from Hofstra University with a bachelor's degree in psychology as well as a master’s in physical education. He was later a wrestling instructor of the university.

=== Training ===
While attending Hofstra, Weidman met Gabriel "Monsta" Toribio, who invited Weidman to come to Matt and Nick Serra's BJJ Academy a few miles from campus in Levittown, New York to help some of the fighters with their wrestling. Weidman also took some submission grappling classes and within three months he competed in and won The East Coast Grappler's Quest in his weight class and the Absolute Division with all 13 matches ending in submissions.

With full-time assistant coaching and graduate school at Hofstra, grappling had to be put on hold for a while. While coaching, Weidman trained for the Olympic trials. When his dream was not attained, Weidman had to decide if he wanted to continue training for the world teams and Olympics or give MMA a shot. Toribio brought Weidman to Ray Longo's MMA Academy and introduced Weidman to Longo. With his noticeable technique and skills, Weidman was encouraged to train full-time to fight. In 2011, Longo and Weidman LAW MMA opened, where they are instructors, owners, and operators in Garden City, New York.

For such a novice fighter to be so aggressive and technical in a pure grappling competition against one of the world's best speaks volumes to what a great MMA middleweight Chris Weidman may become.

— Jordan Breen on Chris Weidman at ADCC 2009

After winning the ADCC East Coast Trials, Weidman qualified for and competed at the 2009 ADCC Submission Wrestling World Championship (with one year of formal submission grappling training) in Barcelona where he lost in a quarter-final match-up.

In May 2015, Weidman got a black belt in Brazilian Jiu-Jitsu from Renzo Gracie and Matt Serra.

== Mixed martial arts career ==
=== Ring of Combat ===
Weidman made his MMA professional debut representing the Serra-Longo Fight Team in February 2009 in Louis Neglia's Ring of Combat 23. He fought as a Middleweight against Reuben Lopes, whom he submitted quickly via kimura, at 1:35 of the first round. Two months later at Ring of Combat 24, he stopped Mike Stewart with punches in the first round.

His combination of gravity-defying throws, an ironclad base and scarily preternatural grappling skills has already made him one of North America's premier prospects.

— Tomas Rios on Chris Weidman in 2010

In his third bout, Weidman won the Ring of Combat middleweight title on September 24, 2010, by defeating Uriah Hall at Ring of Combat 31 via punches in the first round. Weidman defended the ROC Middleweight Championship on December 3, 2010, at Ring of Combat 33 with an impressive victory over Valdir Araujo via unanimous decision. By this point Weidman was being called "one of the most highly-touted blue chip middleweight prospects ever". Weidman was offered contracts by numerous organizations, but Weidman elected to wait until the UFC offered him a contract, which he quickly accepted.

=== Ultimate Fighting Championship ===
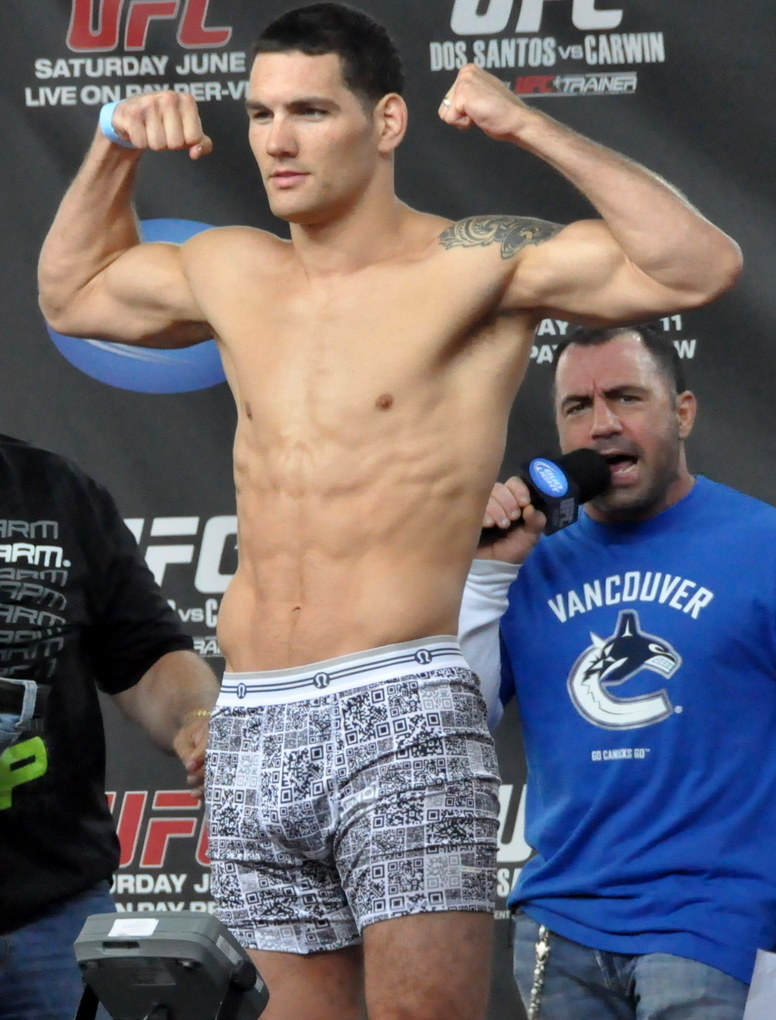
Chris Weidman at the weigh-ins of UFC 131 in June 2011

Weidman made his UFC debut against Alessio Sakara on March 3, 2011, at UFC Live: Sanchez vs. Kampmann, replacing an injured Rafael Natal. Weidman, who took the fight on two weeks' notice and who was also nursing a rib injury, won a unanimous decision, scoring a decisive 30–27 on all three judges' scorecards.

Weidman faced Jesse Bongfeldt on June 11, 2011, at UFC 131, replacing an injured Court McGee. Weidman defeated Bongfeldt via first round standing guillotine choke, earning $70,000 "Submission of the Night" honors.

Weidman next faced Tom Lawlor on November 19, 2011, at UFC 139. He won the fight via technical submission, rendering Lawlor unconscious with a D'Arce choke in the first round.

Weidman defeated Demian Maia by unanimous decision (29–28, 30–27, and 29–28) on January 28, 2012, at UFC on Fox 2. The fight was initially announced as a split decision but the judges actually scored it as a unanimous decision, clarified by UFC President Dana White in a tweet. Weidman replaced Michael Bisping on eleven days' notice after Mark Muñoz was forced out of his fight with Chael Sonnen. Bisping was chosen to take Munoz's place in the co-main event.

I want Anderson Silva. Every time I've had a full training camp, I've gotten a finish. Give me a full training camp and I'd love a shot at the man, Anderson Silva. I really think I could do pretty good. So give me a shot, please.

— Chris Weidman after defeating Mark Muñoz in 2012

Weidman faced Mark Muñoz on July 11, 2012, at UFC on Fuel TV: Muñoz vs. Weidman. Weidman dominated Munoz throughout first round using his wrestling skills. In the second round, he knocked out Munoz with a counter elbow to the forehead followed by ground and pound to an unconscious Munoz, which awarded Weidman "Knockout of the Night" honors. After the fight, Weidman expressed a desire to fight Anderson Silva and become the middleweight title holder.

Weidman was expected to fight Tim Boetsch on December 29, 2012, at UFC 155. However, Weidman pulled out of the bout due to an injury and was replaced by Costas Philippou.

==== UFC Middleweight Champion ====
After nearly a year out of competition due to injury and Hurricane Sandy, on July 6, 2013, Weidman faced Anderson Silva for the UFC Middleweight title in UFC 162 before a crowd of 12,399 spectators at the MGM Grand Garden Arena. Bookmakers rated Weidman a 2–1 underdog; however, numerous pundits and fighters including long-reigning UFC welterweight champion Georges St-Pierre, picked Weidman to upset the long-reigning middleweight champion:

I believe it's a bad matchup for Anderson Silva. Very bad, style-wise. Anderson's weaknesses are Weidman's strengths. I've trained with Weidman, and his wrestling is on another level. Not only is Chris Weidman going to beat Anderson Silva, I believe he's going to finish Anderson. I believe it's not going to last too long, this fight. This fight will shock a lot of people.

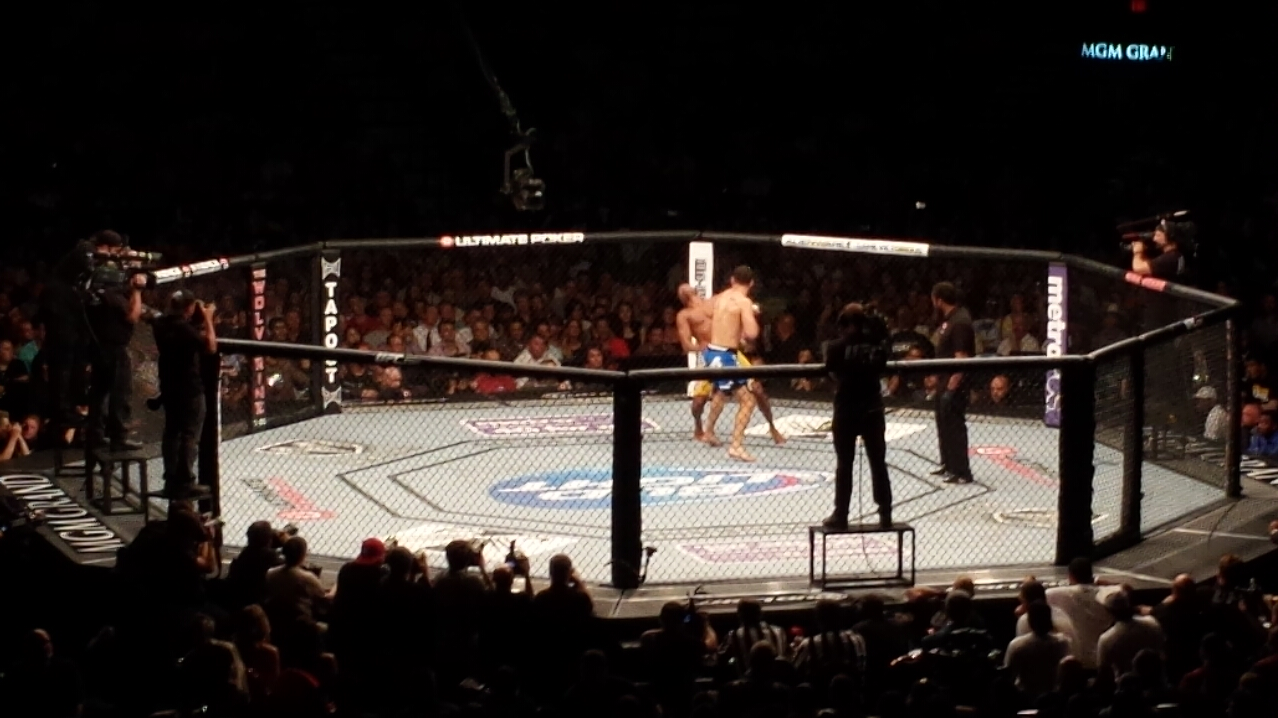
Chris Weidman knocking out Anderson Silva at UFC 162 in Las Vegas, Nevada in July 2013

As St-Pierre predicted, Weidman knocked out Silva early in the second round with another "Knockout of the Night" performance to become the new UFC Middleweight Champion. In the first round, Weidman took down the champion onto the canvas to apply some solid ground-and-pound. The second round saw Silva taunting and mocking Weidman until he was caught and dropped by Weidman's left hook which was followed with punches to the grounded Silva — rendering him unconscious. The loss to Weidman was Silva's first in the UFC and ended his seven-year, 17-fight undefeated streak. The KO victory gave Weidman the distinction of being the first person to have ever knocked out Silva in a mixed martial arts match. In honor of Weidman's victory, Nassau County proclaimed July seventeenth "Chris Weidman Day". Mixed Martial Arts website Sherdog also declared Weidman's knockout of Anderson Silva as "Knockout of the Year" for 2013.

On July 13, 2013, the UFC President Dana White announced that Weidman would rematch Silva for his first title defense at UFC 168. Silva once again opened as the betting favorite.

At UFC 168 on December 28, 2013, Weidman defended his title against Anderson Silva. In contrast to their first fight in UFC 162, there was no overt showboating by Silva, yet Weidman still had Silva in trouble early in the first round by dropping him — while in the clinch — with a right hook to the side of the head — followed by a barrage of punches. In spite of Weidman's onslaught, Silva managed to pull guard, regain his composure and bloodied Weidman's nose with some elbows and hammer-fist punches off his back. Weidman, however, controlled the top position for the remainder of the round and landed punches and elbows. At the start of the second round, Silva attacked Weidman with a series of kicks including a heavy inside low kick which Weidman checked with his left knee. This check snapped Silva's left fibula and tibia on contact. Silva immediately fell to the mat, forcing referee Herb Dean to stop the fight 1:16 into the second round and give Weidman the victory by TKO. Low kicks were some of Silva's most effective strikes in their first encounter, which led Weidman to focus on defending against them for the rematch.

That was the number one thing I got hit with in the first fight, so I did work a lot against guys with good kicks and was working on checking them a lot. I did think that if he's going to go that hard on kicks, as he usually does, if I catch it on my knee it could really hurt him. But it's still crazy how that happened. My trainer, Ray Longo, actually broke a guy's leg like that in the gym by putting the knee right on that shin when he kicked, just by following [the kick] up slowly, It's not really going shin-to-shin, but getting your knee on the shin. I've done it in sparring with some hard kickers to let them know not to kick me anymore. Their legs didn't break, but they would either take a minute to walk it off or they wouldn't be kicking me as much. It's something I've definitely been working on, thanks to Longo.

Weidman was expected to defend his belt against Vitor Belfort at UFC 173. Weidman opened as a 2-to-1 betting favorite. After Vitor Belfort withdrew from his title bout at UFC 173, it was announced that Lyoto Machida will next face Weidman. However, the bout was delayed after Weidman sustained a knee injury which required a minor surgery on both of his knees, including meniscal tears in both knees that he had since high school. The bout against Machida eventually took place on July 5, 2014, at UFC 175. Weidman retained his title, winning via unanimous decision (49–45, 48–47, and 49–46). After the fight his wife entered the octagon to kiss Weidman, whilst the audience cheered. The bout also earned Weidman his first Fight of the Night bonus award.

A rescheduled bout with Belfort was expected to take place on December 6, 2014, at UFC 181. However, on September 22, it was announced that Weidman had suffered a broken hand and the bout was again rescheduled to take place on February 28, 2015, at UFC 184. However, on January 30, the UFC announced that Weidman had pulled out of the bout, citing an injury he sustained in training. The bout with Belfort eventually took place on May 23, 2015, at UFC 187. After surviving an initial flurry of punches from Belfort, Weidman secured a takedown, went into the mount position, and won the fight via TKO due to strikes in the first round. This fight earned him a Performance of the Night award.

In the fourth defense of his title, Weidman faced Luke Rockhold on December 12, 2015, in the co-main event at UFC 194. Weidman lost the bout and his title via TKO in the fourth round. That was the very first defeat of Weidman's career. After two and a half back-and-forth rounds, Weidman conceded a takedown after a missed wheel kick, Rockhold took Weidman's back and from there transitioned to the full mount landing heavy damage with ground and pound. After taking damage Weidman survived until the fourth round where Rockhold again took him down and continued his ground and pound success which ultimately led to a fourth-round TKO stoppage by the referee Herb Dean. Both participants were awarded Fight of the Night honors.

==== Post-championship ====
A rematch with Rockhold was scheduled to take place on June 4, 2016, at UFC 199. However, Weidman pulled out of the fight on May 17 with a cervical disc herniation.

Weidman signed a new, six-fight contract with UFC in late September 2016 and faced Yoel Romero on November 12, 2016, at UFC 205. Weidman lost the fight in the third round after getting knocked out by a flying knee.

Weidman faced Gegard Mousasi at UFC 210. At 3:13 in the second round, Mousasi kneed Weidman twice in the head while Weidman had his hands near the ground. The referee stopped the fight because he thought that the second of these strikes were illegal. Weidman was allowed to recover, but after watching the replay the officials concluded the strike was legal. The doctors did not allow Weidman to continue and a TKO victory was granted to Mousasi.

Weidman next faced Kelvin Gastelum on July 22, 2017, at UFC on Fox 25. After being dropped at the end of the first round, Weidman rallied and submitted Gastelum via arm-triangle choke in the third round. Weidman appeared emotional and said at the post-fight press conference that the doubts and negative comments which he received during his three-fight losing streak were tough on him and his family and he was happy to be back in the game.

After the last debacle in the last fight. I had to sit back and listen to people doubt me and wait my turn to get back out here and show everybody what I'm made out of and man! I love my wife, I love my wife. Ah, this is a tough sport guys. This is a tough sport. You gotta have thick skin. The family has to have thick skin. Your coaches have to have thick skin. You drag your family through mud in this sport with the things that they have to hear. Feels good to get back where I deserve.

A rematch with Luke Rockhold was expected to take place on November 3, 2018 at UFC 230. However, on October 19, 2018, it was reported Rockhold withdrew from the bout, citing an injury, and he was replaced by Ronaldo Souza. Weidman lost the back-and-forth bout via KO at 2:12 of the third round. Both fighters earned Fight of the Night honors.

==== Move to Light Heavyweight ====
In June 2019, Weidman announced his intentions to move up to Light Heavyweight beginning later on in 2019. He cites numerous surgeries which prevent him from being able to cut to Middleweight as his reason for moving up weight classes.

Weidman's light heavyweight debut took place on October 18, 2019 at UFC on ESPN 6 against Dominick Reyes in the main event. Weidman lost the fight via knockout in the first round.

==== Return to Middleweight and injury ====
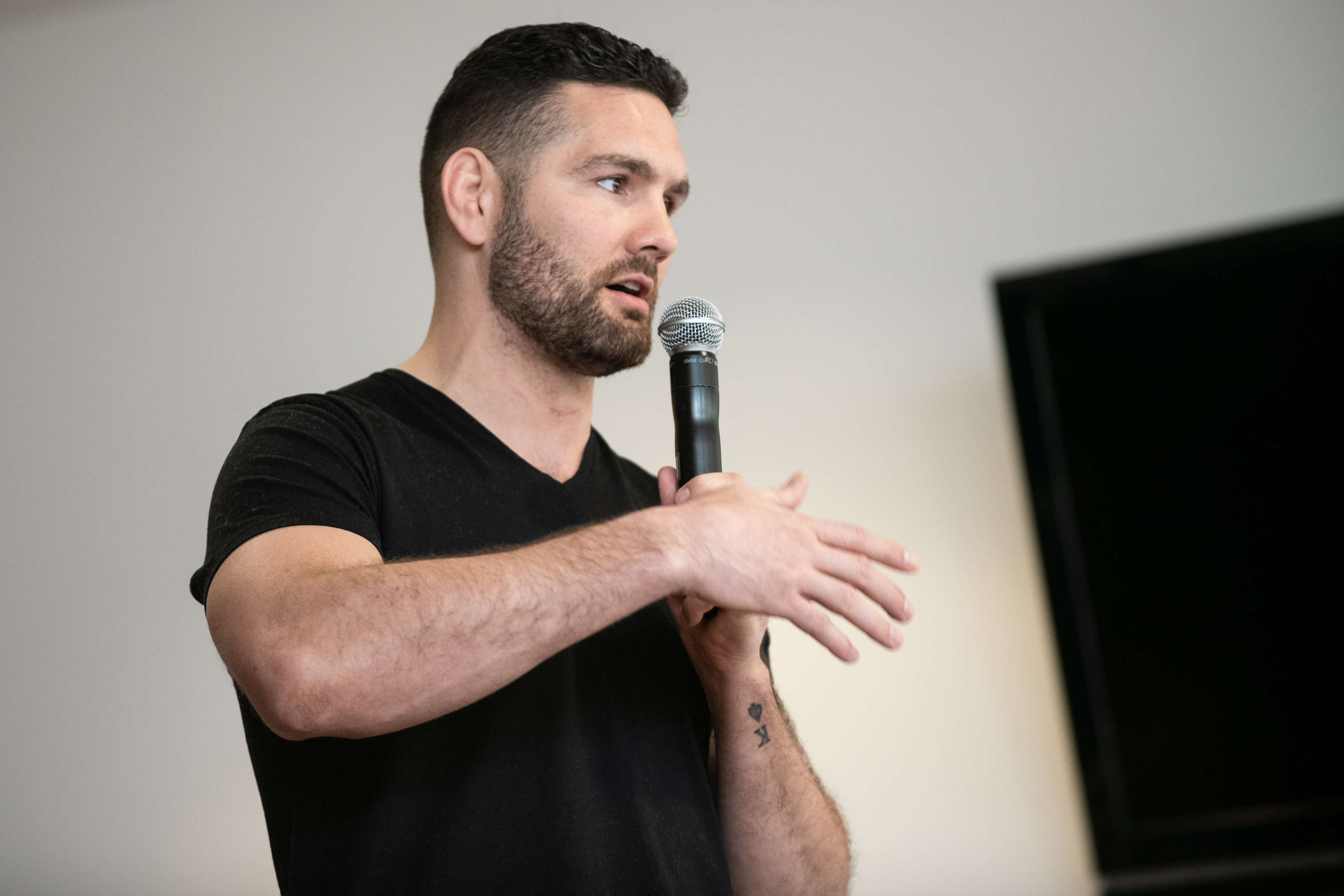
Chris Weidman answers questions during a USO show at Ramstein Air Base, Germany.

Weidman was expected to face Jack Hermansson in a middleweight bout on May 2, 2020 at UFC Fight Night: Hermansson vs. Weidman. However, on April 9, Dana White, the president of UFC announced that this event was postponed to a future date and the pairing was scrapped.

Weidman faced Omari Akhmedov on August 8, 2020 at UFC Fight Night 174. He won the fight via unanimous decision.

A rematch with Uriah Hall was expected to take place on February 13, 2021 at UFC 258. However, Weidman was pulled from the event due to a positive COVID-19 test and the bout was cancelled, The rematch took place at UFC 261 on April 24, 2021. At the start of the first round, Weidman threw a heavy outside low kick which Hall checked with his left knee, causing Weidman's right fibula and tibia to snap on contact. Weidman immediately fell to the mat, with referee Herb Dean calling a stop to the fight and declaring Hall the winner via technical knockout. This injury was similar to the one Anderson Silva sustained against Weidman during their second match in December 2013, when Silva's left fibula and tibia were snapped after Weidman checked a leg kick.

After the injury at UFC 261, Weidman was stretchered out of the octagon and was transported to the hospital, where he underwent surgery. He announced the following day that doctors had informed him that he would be unable to walk without crutches for eight weeks, and would need a recovery period of between six and twelve months before he could resume mixed martial arts training. As of mid-June, he had already returned to light training within seven weeks after sustaining the injury. Weidman then underwent a second surgery as the fracture was not healing properly. As of early 2022, Weidman hoped to have a fight scheduled before the end of the year.

After over two years away, Weidman faced Brad Tavares at UFC 292 on August 19, 2023. He lost the fight via unanimous decision.

Weidman faced Bruno Silva on March 30, 2024, at UFC on ESPN 54. He won the fight via TKO in the third round. However, the result would immediately be overturned to a technical decision win for Weidman due to him poking Silva in both eyes during the finishing sequence.

Weidman was scheduled to face former LFA Midleweight Champion Eryk Anders on November 9, 2024 at UFC 309. However, Anders withdrew on the day of the event because of food poisoning the night before and the bout was scrapped. The bout was rescheduled for UFC 310 on December 7, 2024 in a 195 lb catchweight bout. He lost the fight by technical knockout via ground punches at the end of the second round.

On January 17, 2025, Weidman announced on the weigh-in show for UFC 311 that he was retiring from the UFC.

=== Global Fight League ===
On January 25, 2025, it was reported that Weidman had been drafted on the New York Team of the 2025 season for startup mixed martial arts organization Global Fight League.

In the company's first announced bout, Weidman was scheduled to face Luke Rockhold in a rematch at a to be announced date and location. However, in April 2025, it was reported that all GFL events were cancelled indefinitely.

=== Hall of Fame ===
On May 9, 2026, Weidman was announced as an inductee into the UFC Hall of Fame Class of 2026 during the UFC 328 broadcast.

== Professional grappling career ==
Weidman won the ADCC East Coast Trials in 2009 and earned an invitation to that year's world championships. He competed at 88 kg and lost on points to André Galvão in the opening round, before being submitted by Vinny Magalhães in the absolute division.

Weidman was booked to compete against ADCC veteran and Judoka Owen Livesey in the main event of Polaris 23 on March 11, 2023. He lost the match by unanimous decision.

Weidman then defeated Héctor Lombard by disqualification at ACBJJ 16 on June 19, 2025.

== Freestyle wrestling career ==
Weidman made his official freestyle wrestling debut, facing two-time Pac-10 champion and NJCAA gold medalist Colby Covington in the co-main event of RAF 09 on May 30, 2026. He lost the match by decision (4–5).

Replacing Colby Covington who withdrew due to an injury, Weidman is scheduled to compete for the inaugural RAF Light Heavyweight Crossover Championship against Khamzat Chimaev on November 14, 2026 at RAF Abu Dhabi.

== Personal life ==
On October 29, 2012, Weidman's house was severely damaged by Hurricane Sandy. He subsequently volunteered to help rebuild Sandy victims' homes via the non-profit group Staten Strong.

Weidman is a practicing Christian. He and his wife Marivi have three children. The couple began dating during their high school days. Weidman and his family moved from New York to South Carolina in the summer of 2020.

Weidman's sister is married to UFC fighter Stephen Thompson's brother.

== Filmography ==
=== Television ===
Year	Title	Role	Notes
2016–2018	Kevin Can Wait	Nick Dawson	4 episodes

== Championships and accomplishments ==
=== Collegiate wrestling ===
- National Collegiate Athletic Association
  - NCAA Division I All-American (2006, 2007)
  - NCAA Division I 197 lb – 6th place out of Hofstra University (2006)
  - NCAA Division I 197 lb – 3rd place out of Hofstra University (2007)
- National Junior College Athletic Association
  - NJCAA All-American Team (2004, 2005)

=== Mixed martial arts ===
- Ultimate Fighting Championship
  - UFC Hall of Fame (Modern Wing, Class of 2026)
  - UFC Middleweight Championship (One time)
    - Three successful title defenses
    - Third most title fight wins in UFC Middleweight division history (4)
  - Fight of the Night (Three times) vs. Lyoto Machida, Luke Rockhold and Ronaldo Souza
  - Knockout of the Night (Two times) vs. Mark Muñoz and Anderson Silva 1
  - Submission of the Night (One time) vs. Jess Bongfeldt
  - Performance of the Night (One time) vs. Vitor Belfort
    - Tied (Ronaldo Souza) for fifth most Post-Fight bonuses in UFC Middleweight division history (7)
  - Second most takedowns landed in UFC Middleweight division history (43) (behind Anthony Hernandez)
  - Tied (Dricus du Plessis) for third longest win streak in UFC Middleweight division history (9)
  - UFC.com Awards
    - 2011: Newcomer of the Year
    - 2012: Half-Year Awards: Best Fighter of the 1HY
    - 2013: Fighter of the Year, Knockout of the Year vs. Anderson Silva 1, Upset of the Year vs. Anderson Silva 1 & Ranked #8 Fight of the Year vs. Anderson Silva 1
    - 2018: Ranked #6 Fight of the Year vs. Ronaldo Souza
- Ring of Combat
  - ROC Middleweight Championship (One time)
  - One successful title defense
- World MMA Awards
  - 2012 Breakthrough Fighter of the Year
  - 2013 Charles 'Mask' Lewis Fighter of the Year
- Black Belt magazine
  - 2014 MMA Fighter of the Year
- Bloody Elbow
  - 2013 Fighter of the Year
  - 2013 Knockout of the Year vs. Anderson Silva at UFC 162
  - 2013 Upset of the Year vs. Anderson Silva at UFC 162
- Yahoo! Sports
  - 2013 Male Fighter of the Year
  - 2013 Knockout of the Year vs. Anderson Silva at UFC 162
- Fight Matrix
  - 2014 Most Noteworthy Match of the Year vs. Lyoto Machida at UFC 175
- MMA Junkie
  - 2013 Fighter of the Year
  - 2013 Knockout of the Year vs. Anderson Silva at UFC 162
  - 2014 July Fight of the Month vs. Lyoto Machida at UFC 175
- Inside MMA
  - 2013 Upset of the Year Bazzie Award vs. Anderson Silva at UFC 162
- Bleacher Report
  - 2012 #4 Ranked Fighter of the Year
  - 2013 #2 Ranked Fighter of the Year
  - 2014 #3 Ranked Fight of the Year vs. Lyoto Machida at UFC 175
- Arizona Sports
  - 2013 Knockout of the Year vs. Anderson Silva at UFC 162

== Mixed martial arts record ==
Professional record breakdown
24 matches	16 wins	8 losses
By knockout	6	7
By submission	4	0
By decision	6	1

Res.	Record	Opponent	Method	Event	Date	Round	Time	Location	Notes
Loss	16–8	Eryk Anders	TKO (punches)	UFC 310	December 7, 2024	2	4:50	Las Vegas, Nevada, United States	Catchweight (195 lb) bout.
Win	16–7	Bruno Silva	Technical Decision (unanimous)	UFC on ESPN: Blanchfield vs. Fiorot	March 30, 2024	3	2:18	Atlantic City, New Jersey, United States	Originally ruled a TKO (punches) win for Weidman; changed to a decision by the athletic commission due to Silva suffering a double eye poke leading to the stoppage.
Loss	15–7	Brad Tavares	Decision (unanimous)	UFC 292	August 19, 2023	3	5:00	Boston, Massachusetts, United States	
Loss	15–6	Uriah Hall	TKO (leg injury)	UFC 261	April 24, 2021	1	0:17	Jacksonville, Florida, United States	
Win	15–5	Omari Akhmedov	Decision (unanimous)	UFC Fight Night: Lewis vs. Oleinik	August 8, 2020	3	5:00	Las Vegas, Nevada, United States	Return to Middleweight.
Loss	14–5	Dominick Reyes	KO (punches)	UFC on ESPN: Reyes vs. Weidman	October 18, 2019	1	1:43	Boston, Massachusetts, United States	Light Heavyweight debut.
Loss	14–4	Ronaldo Souza	KO (punches)	UFC 230	November 3, 2018	3	2:46	New York City, New York, United States	Fight of the Night.
Win	14–3	Kelvin Gastelum	Submission (arm-triangle choke)	UFC on Fox: Weidman vs. Gastelum	July 22, 2017	3	3:45	Uniondale, New York, United States	
Loss	13–3	Gegard Mousasi	TKO (knees)	UFC 210	April 8, 2017	2	3:13	Buffalo, New York, United States	
Loss	13–2	Yoel Romero	KO (flying knee)	UFC 205	November 12, 2016	3	0:24	New York City, New York, United States	
Loss	13–1	Luke Rockhold	TKO (punches)	UFC 194	December 12, 2015	4	3:12	Las Vegas, Nevada, United States	Lost the UFC Middleweight Championship. Fight of the Night.
Win	13–0	Vitor Belfort	TKO (punches)	UFC 187	May 23, 2015	1	2:53	Las Vegas, Nevada, United States	Defended the UFC Middleweight Championship. Performance of the Night.
Win	12–0	Lyoto Machida	Decision (unanimous)	UFC 175	July 5, 2014	5	5:00	Las Vegas, Nevada, United States	Defended the UFC Middleweight Championship. Fight of the Night.
Win	11–0	Anderson Silva	TKO (leg injury)	UFC 168	December 28, 2013	2	1:16	Las Vegas, Nevada, United States	Defended the UFC Middleweight Championship.
Win	10–0	Anderson Silva	KO (punches)	UFC 162	July 6, 2013	2	1:18	Las Vegas, Nevada, United States	Won the UFC Middleweight Championship. Knockout of the Night.
Win	9–0	Mark Muñoz	KO (elbow and punches)	UFC on Fuel TV: Muñoz vs. Weidman	July 11, 2012	2	1:37	San Jose, California, United States	Knockout of the Night.
Win	8–0	Demian Maia	Decision (unanimous)	UFC on Fox: Evans vs. Davis	January 28, 2012	3	5:00	Chicago, Illinois, United States	
Win	7–0	Tom Lawlor	Technical Submission (D'Arce choke)	UFC 139	November 19, 2011	1	2:07	San Jose, California, United States	
Win	6–0	Jesse Bongfeldt	Submission (guillotine choke)	UFC 131	June 11, 2011	1	4:54	Vancouver, British Columbia, Canada	Submission of the Night.
Win	5–0	Alessio Sakara	Decision (unanimous)	UFC Live: Sanchez vs. Kampmann	March 3, 2011	3	5:00	Louisville, Kentucky, United States	
Win	4–0	Valdir Araújo	Decision (unanimous)	Ring of Combat 33	December 3, 2010	3	5:00	Atlantic City, New Jersey, United States	Defended the Ring of Combat Middleweight Championship.
Win	3–0	Uriah Hall	TKO (punches)	Ring of Combat 31	September 24, 2010	1	3:06	Atlantic City, New Jersey, United States	Middleweight debut. Won the Ring of Combat Middleweight Championship.
Win	2–0	Mike Stewart	TKO (punches)	Ring of Combat 24	April 17, 2009	1	2:38	Atlantic City, New Jersey, United States	Catchweight (190 lb) bout.
Win	1–0	Reubem Lopes	Submission (kimura)	Ring of Combat 23	February 20, 2009	1	1:35	Atlantic City, New Jersey, United States	Catchweight (190 lb) bout.

== NCAA record ==
NCAA Championships Matches
Res.	Record	Opponent	Score	Date	Event
2007 NCAA Championships (bronze) at 197 lbs
Win	8–2	J.D. Bergman	9–4	March 15–17, 2007	2007 NCAA Division I Wrestling Championships
Win	7–2	Jerry Rinaldi	4–3	March 15–17, 2007	2007 NCAA Division I Wrestling Championships
Loss	6–2	Josh Glenn	Fall	March 15–17, 2007	2007 NCAA Division I Wrestling Championships
Win	6–1	Mike Tamillow	9–8	March 15–17, 2007	2007 NCAA Division I Wrestling Championships
Win	5–1	Jared Villers	9–2	March 15–17, 2007	2007 NCAA Division I Wrestling Championships
Win	4–1	Dustin Porter	Fall	March 15–17, 2007	2007 NCAA Division I Wrestling Championships
2006 NCAA Championships 6th at 197 lbs
Loss	3–1	Jake Rosholt	Fall	March 16–18, 2006	2006 NCAA Division I Wrestling Championships
Win	3–0	Ryan Bader	10–7	March 16–18, 2006	2006 NCAA Division I Wrestling Championships
Win	2–0	Wynn Michalak	10–7	March 16–18, 2006	2006 NCAA Division I Wrestling Championships
Win	1–0	Darren Burns	10–4	March 16–18, 2006	2006 NCAA Division I Wrestling Championships

== Freestyle wrestling record ==
Freestyle matches
Res.	Record	Opponent	Score	Date	Event	Location
RAF 09 at 200 lb catchweight limit.
Loss	0-1	(United States) Colby Covington	4-5	May 30, 2026	RAF 09: Steveson vs. Romanov	(United States) Arlington, Texas

== Pay-per-view bouts ==
No.	Event	Fight	Date	Venue	City	PPV Buys
1.	UFC 162	Silva vs. Weidman	July 6, 2013	MGM Grand Garden Arena	Las Vegas, Nevada, U.S.	550,000
2.	UFC 168	Weidman vs. Silva 2	December 28, 2013	MGM Grand Garden Arena	Las Vegas, Nevada, U.S.	1,025,000
3.	UFC 175	Weidman vs. Machida	July 5, 2014	Mandalay Bay Events Center	Las Vegas, Nevada, U.S.	545,000
Total sales						2,120,000

== See also ==
- List of current mixed martial arts champions
- List of male mixed martial artists

Achievements
Preceded by Anderson Silva	6th UFC Middleweight Champion; July 6, 2013 – December 12, 2015	Succeeded by Luke Rockhold
Awards
Preceded by Donald Cerrone	World MMA Breakthrough Fighter of the Year; 2012	Succeeded by Travis Browne
Preceded by Jon Jones	World MMA Fighter of the Year; 2013	Succeeded by Robbie Lawler
