= UFC 162 =

UFC mixed martial arts event in 2013

UFC 162: Silva vs. Weidman
- The poster for UFC 162: Silva vs. Weidman
- Promotion: Ultimate Fighting Championship
- Date: July 6, 2013
- Venue: MGM Grand Garden Arena
- City: Las Vegas, Nevada
- Attendance: 12,964
- Total gate: $4.826 million
- Buyrate: 550,000

Event chronology
| UFC 161: Evans vs. Henderson | UFC 162: Silva vs. Weidman | UFC on Fox: Johnson vs. Moraga |

UFC 162: Silva vs. Weidman was a mixed martial arts event on July 6, 2013, at the MGM Grand Garden Arena in Las Vegas, Nevada.

== Background ==
The main event was a UFC Middleweight Championship bout between long time title holder Anderson Silva and undefeated top contender Chris Weidman.

Also, co-featured on the card was expected to be a bout between top featherweight contenders Ricardo Lamas and Chan Sung Jung; however on June 14, it was announced that Jung had been pulled from the Lamas bout and would replace an injured Anthony Pettis to face José Aldo on August 3, 2013, at UFC 163. As a result, Lamas was pulled from the event.

A bout between Thiago Silva and Rafael Cavalcante, briefly linked to this event, was moved to UFC on Fuel TV: Nogueira vs. Werdum.

John Makdessi was expected to face Edson Barboza at the event; however, Makdessi, pulled out of the bout citing an injury and was replaced by Rafaello Oliveira.

Shane del Rosario was originally scheduled to face Dave Herman at the event; however, del Rosario was forced off the card due to injury and replaced by Gabriel Gonzaga.

== Results ==
Main card
| Weight class | | | | Method | Round | Time | Notes |
|---|---|---|---|---|---|---|---|
| Middleweight | Chris Weidman | def. | Anderson Silva (c) | KO (punches) | 2 | 1:18 | (Note: For the UFC Middleweight Championship.) |
| Featherweight | Frankie Edgar | def. | Charles Oliveira | Decision (unanimous) (30–27, 29–28, 30–27) | 3 | 5:00 |
| Middleweight | Tim Kennedy | def. | Roger Gracie | Decision (unanimous) (30–27, 30–27, 29–28) | 3 | 5:00 |
| Middleweight | Mark Muñoz | def. | Tim Boetsch | Decision (unanimous) (30–26, 30–27, 29–28) | 3 | 5:00 |
| Featherweight | Cub Swanson | def. | Dennis Siver | TKO (punches) | 3 | 2:24 |
Preliminary card (FX)
| Middleweight | Andrew Craig | def. | Chris Leben | Decision (split) (29–28, 28–29, 30–27) | 3 | 5:00 |
| Lightweight | Norman Parke | def. | Kazuki Tokudome | Decision (unanimous) (30–27, 30–27, 29–28) | 3 | 5:00 |
| Heavyweight | Gabriel Gonzaga | def. | Dave Herman | TKO (punches) | 1 | 0:17 | (Note: This bout aired on the broadcast following the Weidman vs Silva bout.) |
| Lightweight | Edson Barboza | def. | Rafaello Oliveira | TKO (leg kicks) | 2 | 1:44 |
Preliminary card (Facebook)
| Welterweight | Brian Melancon | def. | Seth Baczynski | KO (punches) | 1 | 4:59 |
| Welterweight | Mike Pierce | def. | David Mitchell | TKO (punches) | 2 | 2:55 |

== Bonus awards ==
The following fighters received $50,000 bonuses.

- Fight of The Night: Frankie Edgar vs. Charles Oliveira and Cub Swanson vs. Dennis Siver
- Knockout of The Night: Chris Weidman
- Submission of the Night: None awarded as no matches ended by submission

== Reported payout ==
The following is the reported payout to the fighters as reported to the Nevada State Athletic Commission. It does not include sponsor money and also does not include the UFC's traditional "fight night" bonuses.

- Chris Weidman: $48,000 (includes $24,000 win bonus) def. Anderson Silva: $600,000
- Frankie Edgar: $240,000 (includes $120,000 win bonus) def. Charles Oliveira: $21,000
- Tim Kennedy: $90,000 (includes $30,000 win bonus) def. Roger Gracie: $50,000
- Mark Muñoz: $84,000 (includes $42,000 win bonus) def. Tim Boetsch: $37,000
- Cub Swanson: $58,000 (includes $29,000 win bonus) def. Dennis Siver: $33,000
- Andrew Craig: $24,000 (includes $12,000 win bonus) def. Chris Leben: $51,000
- Norman Parke: $30,000 (includes $15,000 win bonus) def. Kazuki Tokudome: $8,000
- Gabriel Gonzaga: $58,000 (includes $29,000 win bonus) def. Dave Herman: $23,000
- Edson Barboza: $46,000 (includes $23,000 win bonus) def. Rafaello Oliveira: $14,000
- Brian Melancon: $16,000 (includes $8,000 win bonus) def. Seth Baczynski: $16,000
- Mike Pierce: $56,000 (includes $28,000 win bonus) def. David Mitchell: $10,000

== See also ==
- List of UFC events
- 2013 in UFC
